= List of New Zealand netball premiers =

New Zealand netball premiers

The following is a list of New Zealand netball teams that have been premiers and minor premiers of the top level national league. Since 2017, this has been the ANZ Premiership. Previous top level national leagues have included the Coca-Cola Cup/National Bank Cup league and the ANZ Championship.

== Coca-Cola Cup/National Bank Cup ==
The Coca-Cola Cup/National Bank Cup was the top level national New Zealand netball league between 1998 and 2007.

=== Grand finals ===
==== Coca-Cola Cup ====
Season	Winners	Score	Runners up	Venue
1998	Otago Rebels	57–50	Southern Sting	Edgar Centre
1999	Southern Sting	63–54	Otago Rebels	Edgar Centre
2000	Southern Sting	43–40	Canterbury Flames	Stadium Southland
2001	Southern Sting	47–44	Canterbury Flames	Stadium Southland

==== National Bank Cup ====
Season	Winners	Score	Runners up	Venue
2002	Southern Sting	54–48	Canterbury Flames	Stadium Southland
2003	Southern Sting	51–49	Northern Force	Stadium Southland
2004	Southern Sting	63–55	Canterbury Flames	Stadium Southland
2005	Waikato Bay of Plenty Magic	65–39	Southern Sting	Stadium Southland
2006	Waikato Bay of Plenty Magic	67–43	Southern Sting	Mystery Creek Events Centre
2007	Southern Sting	50–49	Northern Force	North Shore Events Centre

=== Minor premierships ===
Season	Winners
1998	Otago Rebels
1999	Otago Rebels
2000	Southern Sting
2001	Canterbury Flames ?
2002	Southern Sting
2003	Southern Sting
2004	Southern Sting
2005	?
2006	Southern Sting
2007	Southern Sting

== ANZ Championship ==
The ANZ Championship, also known as the Trans-Tasman Netball League, featured teams from both Australia and New Zealand. Between 2008 and 2016, it was the top-level league in both countries.

=== Grand finals ===
Four ANZ Championship grand finals featured New Zealand teams.

Season	Winners	Score	Runners up	Venue
2008	New South Wales Swifts	65–56	Waikato Bay of Plenty Magic	Acer Arena
2010	Adelaide Thunderbirds	52–42	Waikato Bay of Plenty Magic	Adelaide Entertainment Centre
2011	Queensland Firebirds	57–44	Northern Mystics	Brisbane Convention & Exhibition Centre
2012	Waikato Bay of Plenty Magic	41–38	Melbourne Vixens	Hisense Arena

=== New Zealand Conference finals ===
The 2015 and 2016 seasons featured a New Zealand Conference.

Season	Winners	Score	Runners up	Venue
2015	Waikato Bay of Plenty Magic	57–54	Northern Mystics	The Trusts Arena
2016	Waikato Bay of Plenty Magic	59–57	Southern Steel	Stadium Southland

=== Minor premierships ===
Seasons	Team
2008	Waikato Bay of Plenty Magic ^{(Note 1)}
2015	Northern Mystics ^{(Note 2)}
2016	Southern Steel ^{(Note 1)}

Notes

- ^1 Waikato Bay of Plenty Magic and Southern Steel were overall ANZ Championship minor premiers.
- ^2 Northern Mystics were New Zealand Conference minor premiers.

== ANZ Premiership ==
Since 2017, the top level national league in New Zealand has been the ANZ Premiership.

=== Grand finals ===
Season	Winners	Score	Runners up	Venue
2017	Southern Steel	69–53	Central Pulse	Stadium Southland
2018	Southern Steel	54–53	Central Pulse	Fly Palmy Arena
2019	Central Pulse	52–48	Northern Stars	Te Rauparaha Arena
2020	Central Pulse	43–31	Mainland Tactix	Stadium Southland
2021	Northern Mystics	61–59	Mainland Tactix	Spark Arena
2022	Central Pulse	56–37	Northern Stars	TSB Bank Arena
2023	Northern Mystics	74–56	Northern Stars	Globox Arena

=== Minor premierships ===
Season	Winners
2017	Southern Steel
2018	Central Pulse
2019	Central Pulse
2020	Central Pulse
2021	Northern Mystics
2022	Central Pulse
2023	Northern Mystics
