= 2017 ANZ Premiership season =

Netball league season

- League: ANZ Premiership
- Sport: Netball
- Duration: 26 March – 28 June 2017
- Teams: 6
- TV partner: Sky Sport (New Zealand)
- Minor Premiers: Southern Steel
- Season MVP: Jane Watson (Southern Steel)
- Top scorer: Jhaniele Fowler-Reid (Southern Steel)

Finals
- Champions: Southern Steel
- Runners-up: Central Pulse

ANZ Premiership seasons
- ← 2016 2018 →

The 2017 ANZ Premiership season was the inaugural season of Netball New Zealand's ANZ Premiership. All matches were broadcast on Sky Sport (New Zealand). With a team coached by Reinga Bloxham, captained by Wendy Frew and featuring Gina Crampton, Jhaniele Fowler-Reid, Shannon Francois, and Jane Watson, Southern Steel finished the 2017 season as inaugural ANZ Premiership winners. After finishing the regular season unbeaten and as minor premiers, Steel defeated Central Pulse 69–53 in the grand final. This saw Steel complete a 16 match unbeaten season. The top three teams from the season – Steel, Pulse and Northern Mystics qualified for the 2017 Netball New Zealand Super Club.

== Transfers ==
Player	2016 team	2017 team
Karin Burger	Central Zone	Central Pulse
Tiana Metuarau	Central Zone	Central Pulse
Cathrine Tuivaiti	Northern Mystics	Central Pulse
Sara Bayman	Manchester Thunder	Central Pulse
Kadeen Corbin	Loughborough Lightning	Mainland Tactix
Temalisi Fakahokotau	Northern Mystics	Mainland Tactix
Brooke Leaver	Southern Steel	Mainland Tactix
Sasha Corbin	Loughborough Lightning	Northern Mystics
Bailey Mes	Mainland Tactix	Northern Mystics
Storm Purvis	Southern Steel	Northern Mystics
Samon Nathan	Central Pulse	Northern Mystics
Elisapeta Toeava	Northern Marvels	Northern Mystics
Leana de Bruin	Waikato Bay of Plenty Magic	Northern Stars
Kayla Cullen	Northern Mystics	Northern Stars
Sulu Fitzpatrick	Northern Mystics	Northern Stars
Holly Fowler	Northern Mystics	Northern Stars
Fa'amu Ioane	Northern Mystics	Northern Stars
Malia Paseka	Waikato Bay of Plenty Magic	Northern Stars
Courtney Tairi	Waikato Bay of Plenty Magic	Northern Stars
Afa Rusivakula		Northern Stars
Maia Wilson	Central Pulse	Northern Stars
Jennifer O'Connell	Netball South	Southern Steel
Monica Falkner	NNL Waikato Bay of Plenty	Waikato Bay of Plenty Magic
Lenize Potgieter	Team Bath/Gauteng Jaguars	Waikato Bay of Plenty Magic
Serena Guthrie	Northern Mystics	Giants Netball
Joanne Harten	Waikato Bay of Plenty Magic	Giants Netball
Kristiana Manu'a	Waikato Bay of Plenty Magic	Giants Netball
Jamie-Lee Price	Waikato Bay of Plenty Magic	Giants Netball
Ellen Halpenny	Waikato Bay of Plenty Magic	Scottish Sirens
Mwai Kumwenda	Mainland Tactix	Melbourne Vixens

== Head coaches and captains ==
Team	Head coach	Captain
Central Pulse	Yvette McCausland-Durie	Katrina Grant
Mainland Tactix	Marianne Delaney-Hoshek ^{(Note 1)}	Jess Moulds
Northern Mystics	Helene Wilson	Maria Tutaia; Anna Harrison
Northern Stars	Julie Hoornweg	Leana de Bruin
Southern Steel	Reinga Bloxham	Wendy Frew
Waikato Bay of Plenty Magic	Margaret Forsyth	Casey Kopua

Notes

^1 Marianne Delaney-Hoshek replaced Sue Hawkins as Mainland Tactix coach on 24 April.

== Pre-season tournament ==
In March 2017, Central Pulse and Netball Central hosted the official ANZ Premiership pre-season tournament at Te Wānanga o Raukawa in Ōtaki. All six teams participated in the three day tournament.

Day 1

10 March 2017	Central Pulse	53–40	Northern Mystics
	Tiana Metuarau 32/38 (84%); Te Amo Amaru-Tibble 21/27 (78%)	Report	Tera-Maria Amani 20/24 (83%); Bailey Mes 12/16 (75%); Lahaina-Lee Upu-Toparea 8/11 (73%)

10 March 2017	Southern Steel	74–64	Waikato Bay of Plenty Magic
	Jhaniele Fowler-Reid 38/40 (95%); Te Paea Selby-Rickit 20/27 (74%); Jennifer O'Connell 9/12 (75%); Jamie Hume 7/8 (88%)	Report; Stats	Lenize Potgieter 42/44 (95%); Monica Falkner 19/25 (76%); Grace Rasmussen 3/4 (75%)

10 March 2017	Northern Stars	51–49	Mainland Tactix
	Malia Vaka 30/34 (88%); Afa Rusivakula 14/18 (78%); Maia Wilson 7/10 (70%)	Report	Kadeen Corbin 27/34 (79%); Brooke Leaver 18/21 (86%); Anna Thompson 4/4 (100%)

Day 2

11 March 2017	Central Pulse	48–53	Southern Steel
	Tiana Metuarau 26/30 (87%); Te Amo Amaru-Tibble 21/24 (88%); Mila Reuelu-Buchanan 1/2 (50%)	Report	Jhaniele Fowler-Reid 31/35 (89%); Te Paea Selby-Rickit 19/24 (79%); Jamie Hume 3/12 (25%)

11 March 2017	Waikato Bay of Plenty Magic	53–51	Northern Stars
	Lenize Potgieter 23/26 (88%); Monica Falkner 25/30 (83%); Grace Rasmussen 5/6 (83%)	Report	Malia Vaka 18/23 (78%); Afa Rusivakula 12/16 (75%); Maia Wilson 21/25 (84%)

11 March 2017	Mainland Tactix	60–51	Northern Mystics
	Kadeen Corbin 16/18 (89%); Brooke Leaver 29/37 (78%); Anna Thompson 15/18 (83%)	Report	Tera-Maria Amani 9/11 (82%); Bailey Mes 26/28 (93%); Lahaina-Lee Upu-Toparea 16/22 (73%)

11 March 2017	Central Pulse	45–30 ^{(Note 2)}	Waikato Bay of Plenty Magic
	Tiana Metuarau 18/22 (82%); Te Amo Amaru-Tibble 18/24 (75%); Cathrine Tuivaiti 9/10 (90%)	Report	Lenize Potgieter 17/18 (94%); Monica Falkner 11/15 (73%); Grace Rasmussen 2/3 (67%)

Day 3

12 March 2017	Southern Steel	70–49	Northern Mystics
	Jhaniele Fowler-Reid 39/44 (89%); Te Paea Selby-Rickit 20/26 (77%); Jamie Hume 11/11 (100%)	Report	Eseta Autagavaia 26/33 (79%); Renee Matoe 23/29 (79%)

12 March 2017	Waikato Bay of Plenty Magic	60–54	Mainland Tactix
	Lenize Potgieter 45/51 (88%); Monica Falkner 13/17 (76%); Blaze Leslie 2/5 (40%)	Report	Kadeen Corbin 31/39 (79%); Brooke Leaver 15/20 (75%); Anna Thompson 8/12 (67%)

12 March 2017	Central Pulse	45–44	Northern Stars
	Tiana Metuarau 22/27 (81%); Te Amo Amaru-Tibble 20/26 (77%); Cathrine Tuivaiti 3/4 (75%)	Report	Malia Vaka 24/29 (83%); Afa Rusivakula 6/10 (60%); Maia Wilson 14/15 (93%)

Notes

^2 40 minute game, 4 x 10 minute quarters.

== Regular season ==
=== Round 1 ===
The regular season began with a Super Sunday event hosted at Claudelands Arena. There were wins for the host team, Waikato Bay of Plenty Magic and for Central Pulse and Southern Steel.

26 March 2017	Southern Steel	75–57	Northern Stars	Claudelands Arena
2:00 pm	Jhaniele Fowler-Reid 52/54 (96%); Jamie Hume 3/4 (75%); Te Paea Selby-Rickit 20/24 (83%)	Report; Stats	Afa Rusivakula 8/10 (80%); Malia Vaka 12/13 (92%); Maia Wilson 37/40 (93%)

26 March 2017	Waikato Bay of Plenty Magic	71–48	Mainland Tactix	Claudelands Arena
4:00 pm	Lenize Potgieter 54/58 (93%); Monica Falkner 13/15 (87%); Grace Rasmussen 4/5 (80%)	Report; Stats	Kadeen Corbin 27/39 (69%); Brooke Leaver 9/13 (69%); Anna Thompson 12/14 (86%)

26 March 2017	Northern Mystics	55–56	Central Pulse	Claudelands Arena
6:00 pm	Bailey Mes 24/27 (89%); Maria Tutaia 31/37 (84%)	Report; Stats	Te Amo Amaru-Tibble 7/10 (70%); Tiana Metuarau 16/19 (84%); Cathrine Tuivaiti 33/34 (97%)

27 March 2017	Waikato Bay of Plenty Magic	67–47	Northern Stars	Claudelands Arena
7:40 pm	Monica Falkner 15/19 (79%); Lenize Potgieter 50/52 (96%); Grace Rasmussen 2/2 (100%)	Report; Stats	Afa Rusivakula 12/16 (75%); Malia Vaka 12/18 (67%); Maia Wilson 23/25 (92%)

=== Round 2 ===
2 April 2017	Mainland Tactix	37–48	Northern Stars	Horncastle Arena
2:00 pm	Kadeen Corbin 11/16 (69%); Brooke Leaver 10/14 (71%); Anna Thompson 16/26 (62%)	Report; Stats	Afa Rusivakula 18/22 (82%); Malia Vaka 19/24 (79%); Maia Wilson 11/14 (79%)

3 April 2017	Northern Mystics	67–74	Southern Steel	The Trusts Arena
7:40 pm	Bailey Mes 39/43 (91%); Maria Tutaia 28/39 (72%)	Report; Stats	Jhaniele Fowler-Reid 60–69; Te Paea Selby-Rickit 14/19 (74%)

5 April 2017	Waikato Bay of Plenty Magic	52–50	Central Pulse	Energy Events Centre
7:40 pm	Monica Falkner 13/17 (76%); Lenize Potgieter 39/46 (85%)	Report; Stats	Te Amo Amaru-Tibble 13/17 (76%); Tiana Metuarau 14/19 (74%); Cathrine Tuivaiti 23/25 (92%)

=== Round 3 ===
9 April 2017	Central Pulse	48–37	Mainland Tactix	TSB Bank Arena
2:00 pm	Te Amo Amaru-Tibble 11/14 (79%); Tiana Metuarau 13/18 (72%); Cathrine Tuivaiti 24/27 (89%)	Report; Stats	Kadeen Corbin 7/15 (47%); Brooke Leaver 14/15 (93%); Anna Thompson 16/18 (89%)

10 April 2017	Southern Steel	72–59	Waikato Bay of Plenty Magic	Stadium Southland
7:40 pm	Jhaniele Fowler-Reid 45/50 (90%); Jamie Hume 7/9 (78%); Te Paea Selby-Rickit 20/27 (74%)	Report; Stats	Monica Falkner 19/21 (90%); Lenize Potgieter 38/41 (93%); Grace Rasmussen 2/4 (50%)

12 April 2017	Northern Stars	44–58	Northern Mystics	Vodafone Events Centre
7:40 pm	Afa Rusivakula 15/22 (68%); Malia Vaka 10/16 (63%); Maia Wilson 19/21 (90%)	Report; Stats	Tera-Maria Amani 0/1 (0%); Bailey Mes 25/29 (86%); Maria Tutaia 33/40 (83%)

=== Round 4 ===
16 April 2017	Northern Mystics	67–62	Waikato Bay of Plenty Magic	The Trusts Arena
2:00 pm	Bailey Mes 30/33 (91%); Maria Tutaia 37/44 (84%)	Report; Stats	Monica Falkner 16/23 (70%); Lenize Potgieter 46/50 (92%)

17 April 2017	Northern Stars	44–53	Central Pulse	Vodafone Events Centre
7:40 pm	Afa Rusivakula 7/9 (78%); Malia Vaka 3/5 (60%); Maia Wilson 34/43 (79%)	Report; Stats	Te Amo Amaru-Tibble 4/6 (67%); Tiana Metuarau 18/22 (82%); Cathrine Tuivaiti 31/34 (91%)

19 April 2017	Mainland Tactix	41–90	Southern Steel	Horncastle Arena
7:40 pm	Kadeen Corbin 6/10 (60%); Brooke Leaver 28/32 (88%); Anna Thompson 7/8 (88%)	Report; Stats	Jhaniele Fowler-Reid 70/75 (93%); Jamie Hume 9/15 (60%); Te Paea Selby-Rickit 11/13 (85%)

=== Round 5 ===
23 April 2017	Mainland Tactix	46–61	Waikato Bay of Plenty Magic	Horncastle Arena
2:00 pm	Kadeen Corbin 3/6 (50%); Brooke Leaver 37/44 (84%); Anna Thompson 6/14 (43%)	Report; Stats	Monica Falkner 17/18 (94%); Amorangi Malesala 6/8 (75%); Lenize Potgieter 38/41 (93%)

24 April 2017	Central Pulse	47–43	Northern Mystics	TSB Bank Arena
7:40 pm	Tiana Metuarau 19/23 (83%); Cathrine Tuivaiti 28/29 (97%)	Report; Stats	Bailey Mes 27/36 (75%); Maria Tutaia 16/26 (62%)

26 April 2017	Northern Stars	51–73	Southern Steel	Vodafone Events Centre
7:40 pm	Afa Rusivakula 5/6 (83%); Malia Vaka 8/16 (50%); Maia Wilson 38/42 (90%)	Report; Stats	Jhaniele Fowler-Reid 45/46 (98%); Jamie Hume 8/15 (53%); Te Paea Selby-Rickit 20/26 (77%)

=== Round 6 ===
Round 6 featured a second Super Sunday event, hosted by Southern Steel at Stadium Southland. Steel remained unbeaten, while Waikato Bay of Plenty Magic and Northern Stars both claimed close wins.

30 April 2017	Central Pulse	49–50	Waikato Bay of Plenty Magic	Stadium Southland
2:00 pm	Tiana Metuarau 24/33 (73%); Cathrine Tuivaiti 25/28 (89%)	Report; Stats	Monica Falkner 17/19 (89%); Lenise Potgieter 33/38 (87%)

30 April 2017	Southern Steel	66–46	Northern Mystics	Stadium Southland
4:00 pm	Jhaniele Fowler-Reid 50/59 (85%); Jamie Hume 3/4 (75%); Te Paea Selby-Rickit 13/19 (68%)	Report; Stats	Tera-Maria Amani 2/4 (50%); Bailey Mes 22/27 (81%); Maria Tutaia 22/33 (67%)

30 April 2017	Mainland Tactix	44–49	Northern Stars	Stadium Southland
6:00 pm	Kadeen Corbin 26/35 (74%); Brooke Leaver 8/11 (73%); Anna Thompson 10/12 (83%)	Report; Stats	Maia Wilson 32/37 (86%); Malia Vaka 17/22 (77%); Jess Taane 0/1 (0%)

1 May 2017	Southern Steel	63–50	Central Pulse	Stadium Southland
7:40 pm	Jhaniele Fowler-Reid 49/54 (91%); Te Paea Selby-Rickit 14/23 (61%)	Report; Stats	Tiana Metuarau 24/31 (77%); Cathrine Tuivaiti 26/26 (100%)

3 May 2017	Northern Mystics	71–47	Mainland Tactix	The Trusts Arena
7:40 pm	Tera-Maria Amani 6/6 (100%); Bailey Mes 45/51 (88%); Maria Tutaia 20/23 (87%)	Report; Stats	Ellie Bird 22/25 (88%); Kadeen Corbin 4/6 (67%); Brooke Leaver 15/18 (83%); Anna Thompson 6/8 (75%)

=== Round 7 ===
7 May 2017	Southern Steel	61—55	Mainland Tactix	More FM Arena
2:00 pm	Jhaniele Fowler-Reid 29/31 (94%); Te Paea Selby-Rickit 16/19 (84%); Jamie Hume 16/23 (70%)	Stats	Ellie Bird 34/39 (87%); Brooke Leaver 17/25 (68%); Anna Thompson 4/5 (80%)

8 May 2017	Central Pulse	55—37	Northern Stars	TSB Bank Arena
7:40 pm	Tiana Metuarau 31/36 (86%); Cathrine Tuivaiti 22/23 (96%); Te Amo Amaru-Tibble 2/2 (100%)	Report	Maia Wilson 31/38 (82%); Malia Vaka 6/9 (67%)

10 May 2017	Waikato Bay of Plenty Magic	55—59	Northern Mystics	Claudelands Arena
7:00 pm	Lenise Potgieter 38/42 (90%); Monica Falkner 10/14 (71%); Amorangi Malesala 7/9 (78%)	Stats	Maria Tutaia 31/36 (86%); Bailey Mes 28/35 (80%)

=== Round 8 ===
14 May 2017	Waikato Bay of Plenty Magic	61—65	Southern Steel	Energy Events Centre
2:00 pm	Lenise Potgieter 46/49 (94%); Monica Falkner 12/16 (75%); Amorangi Malesala 3/3 (100%)	Report; Stats	Jhaniele Fowler-Reid 49/56 (88%); Te Paea Selby-Rickit 16/21 (76%)

15 May 2017	Mainland Tactix	38—52	Central Pulse	Horncastle Arena
7:40 pm	Ellie Bird 30/36 (83%); Anna Thompson 5/6 (83%); Brooke Leaver 2/5 (40%); Kadeen Corbin 1/3 (33%)	Report; Stats	Tiana Metuarau 25/28 (89%); Cathrine Tuivaiti 26/27 (96%); Te Amo Amaru-Tibble 1/2 (50%)

17 May 2017	Northern Stars	59—53	Northern Mystics	ASB Kohimarama, Auckland
7:40 pm	Maia Wilson 37/41 (90%); Afa Rusivakula 12/13 (92%); Malia Vaka 10/11 (91%)	Report; Stats	Maria Tutaia 23/29 (79%); Bailey Mes 30/37 (81%)

=== Round 9 ===
21 May 2017	Mainland Tactix	51—63	Northern Mystics	Trafalgar Centre
2:00 pm	Ellie Bird 43/48 (90%); Anna Thompson 4/4 (100%); Brooke Leaver 3/5 (60%); Kadeen Corbin 1/1 (100%)	Report; Stats	Maria Tutaia 30/36 (83%); Bailey Mes 32/38 (84%); Tera-Maria Amani 1/2 (50%)

22 May 2017	Northern Stars	55—50	Waikato Bay of Plenty Magic	Vodafone Events Centre
7:40 pm	Maia Wilson 26/31 (84%); Malia Vaka 18/24 (75%); Afa Rusivakula 11/15 (73%)	Report; Stats	Lenise Potgieter 34/37 (92%); Monica Falkner 16/21 (76%); Amorangi Malesala 0/1 (0%)

24 May 2017	Central Pulse	44—80	Southern Steel	Te Rauparaha Arena
7:40 pm	Cathrine Tuivaiti 26/28 (93%); Tiana Metuarau 11/18 (61%); Te Amo Amaru-Tibble 7/8 (88%)	Report; Stats	Jhaniele Fowler-Reid 66/70 (94%); Te Paea Selby-Rickit 14/21 (67%); Jamie Hume 0/2 (0%)

=== Round 10 ===
28 May 2017	Southern Steel	82—58	Northern Stars	Stadium Southland
2:00 pm	Jhaniele Fowler-Reid 56/59 (95%); Te Paea Selby-Rickit 25/29 (86%); Jennifer O'Connell 1/3 (33%)	Report; Stats	Maia Wilson 42/46 (91%); Malia Vaka 13/19 (68%); Afa Rusivakula 3/5 (60%)

29 May 2017	Waikato Bay of Plenty Magic	65 – 46	Mainland Tactix	Claudelands Arena
7:40 pm	Lenize Potgieter 46/49 (94%); Amorangi Malesala 13/14 (93%); Monica Falkner 6/6 (100%)	Report; Stats	Ellie Bird 33/39 (85%); Anna Thompson 7/8 (88%); Brooke Leaver 6/8 (75%)

31 May 2017	Northern Mystics	64–53	Central Pulse	North Shore Events Centre
7:40 pm	Maria Tutaia 30/37 (81%); Bailey Mes 34/38 (89%)	Report; Stats	Cathrine Tuivaiti 36/36 (100%); Tiana Metuarau 12/20 (60%); Te Amo Amaru-Tibble 5/5 (100%)

=== Round 11 ===
4 June 2017	Northern Stars	43 – 46	Mainland Tactix	Vodafone Events Centre
2:00 pm	Maia Wilson 27/30 (90%); Malia Vaka 13/19 (68%); Afa Rusivakula 3/7 (43%)	Report; Stats	Brooke Leaver 32/34 (94%); Anna Thompson 14/19 (74%)

5 June 2017	Central Pulse	62–45	Waikato Bay of Plenty Magic	Central Energy Trust Arena
7:40pm	Cathrine Tuivaiti 31/33 (94%); Tiana Metuarau 31/36 (86%)	Report; Stats	Lenize Potgieter 34/37 (92%); Amorangi Malesala 3/4 (75%); Monica Falkner 6/7 (86%); Grace Rasmussen 2/2 (100%)

7 June 2017	Southern Steel	68 – 67	Northern Mystics	More FM Arena
7:40 pm	Jhaniele Fowler-Reid 53/58 (91%); Te Paea Selby-Rickit 15/20 (75%)	Report; Stats	Maria Tutaia 20/27 (74%); Bailey Mes 47/50 (94%)

=== Round 12 ===
The third Super Sunday event was hosted by Northern Mystics at The Trusts Arena. Southern Steel remain unbeaten. Mystics and Central Pulse were the other winners on the day.

11 June 2017	Southern Steel	78–59	Waikato Bay of Plenty Magic	The Trusts Arena
2:00 pm	Jhaniele Fowler-Reid 60/66 (91%); Te Paea Selby-Rickit 18/23 (78%)	Report; Stats	Lenize Potgieter 34/38 (89%); Monica Falkner 25/33 (76%)

11 June 2017	Northern Mystics	60–54	Northern Stars	The Trusts Arena
4:00 pm	Maria Tutaia 33/39 (85%); Bailey Mes 27/29 (93%)	Report; Stats	Maia Wilson 36/39 (92%); Malia Vaka 14/20 (70%); Afa Rusivakula 4/7 (57%)

11 June 2017	Central Pulse	56–37	Mainland Tactix	The Trusts Arena
6:00 pm	Cathrine Tuivaiti 28/28 (100%); Tiana Metuarau 28/34 (82%)	Report; Stats	Ellie Bird 19/26 (73%); Brooke Leaver 13/17 (76%); Anna Thompson 5/8 (63%)

12 June 2017	Northern Mystics	59–58	Waikato Bay of Plenty Magic	The Trusts Arena
7:40 pm	Maria Tutaia 34/42 (81%); Bailey Mes 25/30 (83%)	Report; Stats	Lenize Potgieter 39/42 (93%); Monica Falkner 19/24 (79%)

14 June 2017	Mainland Tactix	46–51	Southern Steel	Horncastle Arena
6:00 pm	Ellie Bird 35/41 (85%); Brooke Leaver 11/14 (79%)	Report; Stats	Jennifer O'Connell 38/45 (84%); Jamie Hume 8/15 (53%); Olivia Bates 4/6 (67%); Aliyah Dunn 1/2 (50%)

14 June 2017	Central Pulse	57–47	Northern Stars	Te Rauparaha Arena
8:00 pm	Cathrine Tuivaiti 35/36 (97%); Tiana Metuarau 22/27 (81%)	Report; Stats	Maia Wilson 20/22 (91%); Malia Vaka 12/16 (75%); Afa Rusivakula 15/23 (65%)

=== Round 13 ===
18 June 2017	Northern Mystics	46–57	Mainland Tactix	The Trusts Arena
2:00 pm	Maria Tutaia 24/28 (86%); Bailey Mes 22/23 (96%)	Report; Stats	Brooke Leaver 32/39 (82%); Anna Thompson 25/33 (76%)

19 June 2017	Southern Steel	64–51	Central Pulse	Stadium Southland
7:40 pm	Jhaniele Fowler-Reid 51/53 (96%); Jamie Hume 6/8 (75%); Olivia Bates 4/4 (100%); Jennifer O'Connell 3/6 (50%)	Report; Stats	Cathrine Tuivaiti 28/29 (97%); Tiana Metuarau 12/15 (80%); Te Amo Amaru-Tibble 11/12 (92%)

21 June 2017	Waikato Bay of Plenty Magic	58–45	Northern Stars	ASB Baypark Stadium
7:40 pm	Lenize Potgieter 37/38 (97%); Monica Falkner 21/23 (91%)	Report; Stats	Maia Wilson 22/28 (79%); Malia Vaka 15/18 (83%); Afa Rusivakula 8/10 (80%)

=== Final ladder ===
2017 ANZ Premiership ladder
Pos	Team	P	W	L	GF	GA	GD	G%	BP	Pts
1	Southern Steel	15	15	0	1062	812	250	130.79%	0	30
2	Central Pulse	15	9	6	783	756	27	103.57%	2	20
3	Northern Mystics	15	8	7	878	851	27	111.35%	3	19
4	Waikato Bay of Plenty Magic	15	7	8	873	848	25	102.95%	5	19
5	Northern Stars	15	4	11	738	868	-130	85.02%	1	9
6	Mainland Tactix	15	2	13	676	875	-199	77.26%	2	6

Qualified for Grand final and the 2017 Netball New Zealand Super Club
Qualified for Elimination final and the 2017 Netball New Zealand Super Club

== Finals Series ==
=== Elimination final ===
25 June 2017; 2:00 pm	Report; Stats	Central Pulse	59–52	Northern Mystics	TSB Bank Arena	Sky Sport
25 June 2017; 2:00 pm	Report; Stats	Scoring by quarter: 10–16, 28–30, 45–44, 59–52			TSB Bank Arena	Sky Sport
25 June 2017; 2:00 pm	Report; Stats	Cathrine Tuivaiti 35/37 (95%); Tiana Metuarau 24/28 (86%)		Maria Tutaia 33/35 (94%); Bailey Mes 19/24 (79%)	TSB Bank Arena	Sky Sport

=== Grand final ===
28 June; 7:40 pm	Stats	Southern Steel	69–53	Central Pulse	Stadium Southland	Sky Sport
28 June; 7:40 pm	Stats	Scoring by quarter: 18–10, 35–20, 55–38, 69–53			Stadium Southland	Sky Sport
28 June; 7:40 pm	Stats	Jhaniele Fowler-Reid 56/60 (93%); Te Paea Selby-Rickit 13/19 (68%)		Tiana Metuarau 27/30 (90%); Cathrine Tuivaiti 26/29 (90%)	Stadium Southland	Sky Sport

== Award winners ==
Award	Winner	Team
ANZ Premiership Player of the Year	Jane Watson	Southern Steel

== Season statistics ==
Goal Shooters (by %)
Pos.	Player	Team	Goal (%)
1	Cathrine Tuivaiti	Central Pulse	483/509 (95%)
2	Jhaniele Fowler-Reid	Southern Steel	790/859 (92%)
3	Lenize Potgieter	Waikato Bay of Plenty Magic	606/658 (92%)
4	Maia Wilson	Northern Stars	434/496 (88%)
5	Bailey Mes	Northern Mystics	475/549 (87%)

Defensive Rebounds
Pos.	Player	Team	D/Reb.
1	Phoenix Karaka	Central Pulse	28
2	Casey Kopua	Waikato Bay of Plenty Magic	27
3	Katrina Grant	Central Pulse	24
4=	Kelly Jury	Waikato Bay of Plenty Magic	21
4=	Anna Harrison	Northern Mystics	21

Intercepts
Pos.	Player	Team	Inter.
1	Anna Harrison	Northern Mystics	43
2	Jane Watson	Southern Steel	41
3	Kelly Jury	Waikato Bay of Plenty Magic	37
4	Temalisi Fakahokotau	Mainland Tactix	36
5	Katrina Grant	Central Pulse	32

Centre Pass Receives
Pos.	Player	Team	CPR
1	Gina Crampton	Southern Steel	422
2	Grace Rasmussen	Waikato Bay of Plenty Magic	377
3	Whitney Souness	Central Pulse	369
4	Maria Tutaia	Northern Mystics	335
5	Elisapeta Toeava	Northern Mystics	277

Deflections
Pos.	Player	Team	Def
1	Jane Watson	Southern Steel	104
2	Anna Harrison	Northern Mystics	90
3	Temalisi Fakahokotau	Mainland Tactix	87
4	Katrina Grant	Central Pulse	73
5	Kelly Jury	Waikato Bay of Plenty Magic	63
