= 2018 ANZ Premiership season =

Netball league season

- League: ANZ Premiership
- Sport: Netball
- Duration: 6 May – 12 August 2018
- Teams: 6
- TV partner: Sky Sport (New Zealand)
- Minor Premiers: Central Pulse
- Season MVP: Katrina Grant (Central Pulse)
- Top scorer: Maia Wilson (Northern Stars)

Finals
- Champions: Southern Steel
- Runners-up: Central Pulse

ANZ Premiership seasons
- ← 2017 2019 →

The 2018 ANZ Premiership season was the second season of Netball New Zealand's ANZ Premiership. With a team coached by Reinga Bloxham, captained by Wendy Frew and featuring Gina Crampton, Shannon Francois, Te Paea Selby-Rickit and Te Huinga Reo Selby-Rickit, Southern Steel retained the title, winning their second consecutive premiership. Central Pulse finished the regular season as minor premiers. However, in the grand final Steel defeated Pulse 54–53. The top three teams from the season – Steel, Pulse and Mainland Tactix qualified for the 2018 Netball New Zealand Super Club.

== Transfers ==
Player	2017 team	2018 team
Aliyah Dunn	Southern Steel	Central Pulse
Sulu Fitzpatrick	Northern Stars	Central Pulse
Kate Beveridge	West Coast Fever	Mainland Tactix
Kimiora Poi	Central Zone	Mainland Tactix
Jane Watson	Southern Steel	Mainland Tactix
Jamie Hume	Southern Steel	Northern Mystics
Phoenix Karaka	Central Pulse	Northern Mystics
Ama Agbeze	Adelaide Thunderbirds	Northern Stars
Paula Griffin	Northern Mystics	Northern Stars
Ellen Halpenny	Scottish Sirens	Northern Stars
Grace Kara	Waikato Bay of Plenty Magic	Northern Stars
Anna Thompson	Mainland Tactix	Northern Stars
Malysha Kelly ^{(Note 1)}	Adelaide Thunderbirds	Southern Steel
Hayley Saunders	Mainland Tactix	Waikato Bay of Plenty Magic
Jhaniele Fowler-Reid	Southern Steel	West Coast Fever
Leana de Bruin	Northern Stars	Adelaide Thunderbirds
Sasha Corbin	Northern Mystics	Hertfordshire Mavericks
Kadeen Corbin	Mainland Tactix	Team Bath
Sara Bayman	Central Pulse	UWS Sirens
Cathrine Tuivaiti	Central Pulse	Adelaide Thunderbirds

Notes

^1 Malysha Kelly was injured during pre-season.

== Head coaches and captains ==
Team	Head coach	Captain
Central Pulse	Yvette McCausland-Durie	Katrina Grant
Mainland Tactix	Marianne Delaney-Hoshek	Jess Maclennan; Jane Watson
Northern Mystics	Helene Wilson	Anna Harrison
Northern Stars	Kiri Wills	Grace Kara
Southern Steel	Reinga Bloxham	Wendy Frew
Waikato Bay of Plenty Magic	Margaret Forsyth	Casey Kopua

== Pre-season ==
The official pre-season tournament was held at Te Wānanga o Raukawa in Otaki from 20 to 22 April, with all six teams competing.

Day 1

Fri 20 April	Southern Steel	53–44	Northern Mystics
1:00 pm		Report

Fri 20 April	Central Pulse	64–46	Waikato Bay of Plenty Magic
4:00 pm

Fri 20 April	Northern Stars	55–52	Mainland Tactix
7:00 pm

Day 2

Sat 21 April	Central Pulse	64–40	Southern Steel
12:00 pm

Sat 21 April	Waikato Bay of Plenty Magic	65–53	Northern Stars
2:00 pm

Sat 21 April	Mainland Tactix	54–46	Northern Mystics
5:00 pm

Sat 21 April	Central Pulse	48–29	Northern Stars
7:00 pm

Day 3

Sun 22 April	Mainland Tactix	50–44	Waikato Bay of Plenty Magic
10:00 pm

Sun 22 April	Southern Steel	66–53	Northern Stars
12:00 pm

Sun 22 April	Central Pulse	59–46	Northern Mystics
2:00 pm

== Regular season ==
=== Round 1 ===
The regular season started later than usual on 6 May, delayed because of the 2018 Commonwealth Games. It began with a Super Sunday event hosted at Fly Palmy Arena. There were wins for Southern Steel, Central Pulse and Mainland Tactix.

Sun 6 May	Northern Mystics	47–55	Southern Steel	Fly Palmy Arena
2:10 pm	Tera-Maria Amani 19/21 (90%); Jamie Hume 14/20 (70%); Bailey Mes 14/27 (52%)	Report; Stats	Olivia Bates 0/3 (0%); Jennifer O'Connell 20/23 (87%); Te Paea Selby-Rickit 35/46 (76%)

Sun 6 May	Central Pulse	45–33	Waikato Bay of Plenty Magic	Fly Palmy Arena
4:10 pm	Aliyah Dunn 15/17 (88%); Ameliaranne Ekenasio 20/28 (71%); Tiana Metuarau 10/11 (91%)	Report; Stats	Monica Falkner 8/12 (67%); Amorangi Malesala 23/29 (79%); Harley Smith 2/5 (40%)

Sun 6 May	Northern Stars	60–61	Mainland Tactix	Fly Palmy Arena
6:10 pm	Paula Griffin 19/28 (68%); Ellen Halpenny 5/7 (71%); Maia Wilson 36/44 (82%)	Report; Stats	Kate Beveridge 21/25 (84%); Ellie Bird 30/38 (79%); Brooke Leaver 10/10 (100%)

Mon 7 May	Central Pulse	62–51	Southern Steel	Fly Palmy Arena
7:40 pm	Aliyah Dunn 41/45 (91%); Tiana Metuarau 21/22 (95%)	Report; Stats	Jennifer O'Connell 33/39 (85%); Te Paea Selby-Rickit 18/27 (67%)

Wed 9 May	Northern Mystics	39–42	Mainland Tactix	The Trusts Arena
7:40 pm	Tera-Maria Amani 9/11 (82%); Maria Folau 17/24 (71%); Jamie Hume 7/12 (58%); Bailey Mes 6/8 (75%)	Report; Stats	Kate Beveridge 16/18 (89%); Ellie Bird 25/32 (78%); Brooke Leaver 1/3 (33%)

=== Round 2 ===
Sun 13 May	Northern Mystics	60–54	Northern Stars	The Trusts Arena
4:10 pm	Maria Folau 25/31 (81%); Jamie Hume 5/10 (50%); Bailey Mes 30/42 (71%)	Report; Stats	Paula Griffin 4/8 (50%); Ellen Halpenny 14/19 (74%); Maia Wilson 36/39 (92%)

Mon 14 May	Central Pulse	52–44	Mainland Tactix	TSB Bank Arena
7:40 pm	Aliyah Dunn 33/40 (83%); Ameliaranne Ekenasio 3/4 (75%); Tiana Metuarau 16/17 (94%)	Report; Stats	Kate Beveridge 18/25 (72%); Ellie Bird 13/17 (76%); Brooke Leaver 13/16 (81%)

Wed 16 May	Southern Steel	64–60	Waikato Bay of Plenty Magic	More FM Arena
7:40 pm	Olivia Bates 3/3 (100%); Jennifer O'Connell 29/35 (83%); Te Paea Selby-Rickit 32/39 (82%)	Report; Stats	Monica Falkner 24/27 (89%); Amorangi Malesala 4/5 (80%); Lenize Potgieter 32/39 (82%)

=== Round 3 ===
Sun 20 May	Waikato Bay of Plenty Magic	46–61	Central Pulse	Claudelands Arena
4:10 pm	Monica Falkner 4/7 (57%); Lenize Potgieter 40/43 (93%); Harley Smith 2/4 (50%)	Report; Stats	Aliyah Dunn 38/40 (95%); Ameliaranne Ekenasio 14/18 (78%); Tiana Metuarau 9/12 (75%)

Mon 21 May	Southern Steel	56–52	Northern Mystics	ILT Stadium Southland
7:40 pm	Jennifer O'Connell 37/42 (88%); Te Paea Selby-Rickit 19/24 (79%)	Report; Stats	Tera-Maria Amani 6/7 (86%); Jamie Hume 15/24 (63%); Bailey Mes 31/31 (100%)

Wed 23 May	Mainland Tactix	49–48	Northern Stars	Horncastle Arena
7:40 pm	Kate Beveridge 17/21 (81%); Ellie Bird 24/31 (77%); Brooke Leaver 8/8 (100%)	Report; Stats	Paula Griffin 15/19 (79%); Ellen Halpenny 1/3 (33%); Maia Wilson 32/40 (80%)

=== Round 4 ===
Sun 27 May	Northern Stars	53–64	Waikato Bay of Plenty Magic	Vodafone Events Centre
4:10 pm	Paula Griffin 20/26 (77%); Ellen Halpenny 5/8 (63%); Maia Wilson 28/32 (88%)	Report; Stats	Monica Falkner 22/26 (85%); Lenize Potgieter 42/46 (91%)

Mon 28 May	Mainland Tactix	49–53	Northern Mystics	Horncastle Arena
7:40 pm	Kate Beveridge 13/16 (81%); Ellie Bird 36/47 (77%)	Report; Stats	Jamie Hume 24/34 (71%); Bailey Mes 29/36 (81%)

Wed 30 May	Central Pulse	71–40	Southern Steel	Te Rauparaha Arena
7:40 pm	Aliyah Dunn 50/54 (93%); Ameliaranne Ekenasio 12/19 (63%); Tiana Metuarau 9/12 (75%)	Report; Stats	Olivia Bates 1/3 (33%); Jennifer O'Connell 21/26 (81%); Te Paea Selby-Rickit 18/27 (67%)

=== Round 5 ===
Sun 3 Jun	Southern Steel	63–61	Northern Stars	ILT Stadium Southland
4:10 pm	Olivia Bates 5/6 (83%); Jennifer O'Connell 21/27 (78%); Te Paea Selby-Rickit 37/46 (80%)	Report; Stats	Paula Griffin 19/22 (86%); Maia Wilson 42/45 (93%)

Sun 3 Jun	Northern Mystics	38–60	Central Pulse	The Trusts Arena
6:10 pm	Jamie Hume 19/28 (68%); Bailey Mes 19/27 (70%)	Report; Stats	Aliyah Dunn 39/42 (93%); Ameliaranne Ekenasio 16/18 (89%); Tiana Metuarau 5/7 (71%)

Wed 6 Jun	Mainland Tactix	48–55	Waikato Bay of Plenty Magic	Horncastle Arena
7:40 pm	Kate Beveridge 11/15 (73%); Ellie Bird 32/46 (70%); Brooke Leaver 5/10 (50%)	Report; Stats	Monica Falkner 10/19 (53%); Amorangi Malesala 3/3 (100%); Lenize Potgieter 42/45 (93%)

=== Round 6 ===
The second Super Sunday event was hosted at Horncastle Arena. There were wins for Southern Steel, Waikato Bay of Plenty Magic and Northern Mystics.

Sun 10 Jun	Northern Stars	60–63	Southern Steel	Horncastle Arena
12:10 pm	Paula Griffin 12/13 (92%); Ellen Halpenny 10/13 (77%); Maia Wilson 38/46 (83%)	Report; Stats	Jennifer O'Connell 37/44 (84%); Te Paea Selby-Rickit 26/30 (87%)

Sun 10 Jun	Mainland Tactix	47–48	Waikato Bay of Plenty Magic	Horncastle Arena
2:10 pm	Kate Beveridge 6/8 (75%); Ellie Bird 31/45 (69%); Brooke Leaver 10/16 (63%)	Report; Stats	Monica Falkner 12/12 (100%); Amorangi Malesala 2/3 (67%); Lenize Potgieter 34/41 (83%)

Sun 10 Jun	Central Pulse	51–52	Northern Mystics	Horncastle Arena
4:10 pm	Aliyah Dunn 36/40 (90%); Ameliaranne Ekenasio 6/10 (60%); Tiana Metuarau 9/10 (90%)	Report; Stats	Maria Folau 22/25 (88%); Jamie Hume 7/9 (78%); Bailey Mes 23/26 (88%)

Mon 11 Jun	Mainland Tactix	52–53	Southern Steel	Horncastle Arena
5:40 pm	Kate Beveridge 1/1 (100%); Ellie Bird 36/42 (86%); Brooke Leaver 15/22 (68%)	Report; Stats	Olivia Bates 1/5 (20%); Jennifer O'Connell 28/33 (85%); Te Paea Selby-Rickit 24/33 (73%)

Wed 13 Jun	Waikato Bay of Plenty Magic	64–61	Northern Stars	ASB Baypark Arena
5:40 pm	Monica Falkner 16/21 (76%); Amorangi Malesala 1/2 (50%); Lenize Potgieter 47/52 (90%)	Report; Stats	Paula Griffin 18/23 (78%); Ellen Halpenny 6/7 (86%); Maia Wilson 37/40 (93%)

=== Round 7 ===
Sun 17 Jun	Central Pulse	63–48	Waikato Bay of Plenty Magic	TSB Bank Arena
2:10 pm	Aliyah Dunn 45/49 (92%); Tiana Metuarau 18/20 (90%)	Report; Stats	Monica Falkner 15/20 (75%); Lenize Potgieter 33/35 (94%)

Mon 18 Jun	Northern Stars	56–53	Mainland Tactix	Vodafone Events Centre
5:40 pm	Paula Griffin 20/26 (77%); Maia Wilson 36/40 (90%)	Report; Stats	Kate Beveridge 5/8 (63%); Ellie Bird 45/51 (88%); Brooke Leaver 3/4 (75%)

Wed 20 Jun	Northern Mystics	62–57	Southern Steel	North Shore Events Centre
5:40 pm	Maria Folau 29/35 (83%); Bailey Mes 33/37 (89%)	Report; Stats	Jennifer O'Connell 41/46 (89%); Te Paea Selby-Rickit 16/25 (64%)

=== Round 8 ===
Sun 24 Jun	Southern Steel	52–53	Mainland Tactix	More FM Arena
4:10 pm	Jennifer O'Connell 42/52 (81%); Te Paea Selby-Rickit 10/16 (63%)	Report; Stats	Kate Beveridge 9/12 (75%); Ellie Bird 38/43 (88%); Brooke Leaver 6/9 (67%)

Mon 25 Jun	Central Pulse	66–50	Northern Stars	Te Rauparaha Arena
7:40 pm	Aliyah Dunn 40/43 (93%); Tiana Metuarau 26/30 (87%)	Report; Stats	Paula Griffin 2/4 (50%); Ellen Halpenny 7/8 (88%); Maia Wilson 41/42 (98%)

Wed 27 Jun	Waikato Bay of Plenty Magic	67–52	Northern Mystics	Claudelands Arena
7:40 pm	Monica Falkner 17/22 (77%); Lenize Potgieter 50/53 (94%)	Report; Stats	Maria Folau 17/20 (85%); Jamie Hume 13/19 (68%); Bailey Mes 22/27 (81%)

=== Round 9 ===
Sun 1 Jul	Mainland Tactix	50–40	Northern Mystics	Trafalgar Centre
4:15 pm	Ellie Bird 42/51 (82%); Brooke Leaver 8/13 (62%)	Report; Stats	Tera-Marie Amani 2/2 (100%); Jamie Hume 11/19 (58%); Bailey Mes 27/32 (84%)

Mon 2 Jul	Southern Steel	51–47	Central Pulse	ILT Stadium Southland
7:40 pm	Jennifer O'Connell 30/37 (81%); Te Paea Selby-Rickit 21/28 (75%)	Report; Stats	Aliyah Dunn 22/23 (96%); Ameliaranne Ekenasio 11/12 (92%); Tiana Metuarau 14/20 (70%)

Wed 4 Jul	Northern Stars	56–41	Waikato Bay of Plenty Magic	Vodafone Events Centre
7:40 pm	Maia Wilson 42/46 (91%); Paula Griffin 11/12 (92%); Ellen Halpenny 3/5 (60%)	Report; Stats	Lenize Potgieter 34/38 (89%); Amorangi Malesala 10/14 (71%); Monica Falkner 7/11 (64%)

=== Round 10 ===
Sun 8 Jul	Northern Mystics	55–58	Northern Stars	The Trusts Arena,
4:10 pm	Bailey Mes 31/37 (84%); Jamie Hume 24/32 (75%)	Report; Stats	Maia Wilson 48/54 (89%); Paula Griffin 10/10 (100%)

Mon 9 Jul	Waikato Bay of Plenty Magic	60–76	Southern Steel	Claudelands Arena
7:40 pm	Lenize Potgieter 41/41 (100%); Monica Falkner 19/22 (86%)	Report; Stats	Jennifer O'Connell 53/55 (96%); Te Paea Selby-Rickit 23/26 (88%)

Wed 11 Jul	Mainland Tactix	36–47	Central Pulse	Horncastle Arena
7:40 pm	Ellie Bird 19/24 (79%); Kate Beveridge 10/13 (77%); Brooke Leaver 7/7 (100%); Gemma Hazeldine 0/1 (0%)	Report; Stats	Aliyah Dunn 25/29 (86%); Tiana Metuarau 13/16 (81%); Ameliaranne Ekenasio 9/11 (82%)

=== Round 11 ===
Sun 15 Jul	Northern Stars	50–65	Central Pulse	Vodafone Events Centre
4:10 pm	Maia Wilson 32/34 (94%); Paula Griffin 17/21 (81%); Ellen Halpenny 1/2 (50%)	Report; Stats	Aliyah Dunn 40/44 (91%); Ameliaranne Ekenasio 13/17 (76%); Tiana Metuarau 12/14 (86%)

Mon 16 Jul	Southern Steel	59–56	Mainland Tactix	ILT Stadium Southland
7:40 pm	Jen O'Connell 40/49 (82%); Te Paea Selby-Rickit 19/23 (83%)	Report; Stats	Ellie Bird 40/51 (78%); Brooke Leaver 16/22 (73%)

Wed 18 Jul	Waikato Bay of Plenty Magic	46–53	Northern Mystics	Energy Events Centre
7:40 pm	Lenize Potgieter 39/43 (91%); Monica Falkner 6/10 (60%); Amorangi Malesala 1/4 (25%)	Report; Stats	Tera-Maria Amani 32/34 (94%); Bailey Mes 17/21 (81%); Jamie Hume 4/8 (50%)

=== Round 12 ===
The third Super Sunday was hosted at the Vodafone Events Centre. There were wins for Mainland Tactix, Northern Mystics and Southern Steel.

Sun 22 Jul	Mainland Tactix	44–39	Central Pulse	Vodafone Events Centre
2:10 pm	Ellie Bird 35/41 (85%); Kate Beveridge 6/8 (75%); Brooke Leaver 3/5 (60%)	Report; Stats	Aliyah Dunn 17/20 (85%); Ameliaranne Ekenasio 14/16 (88%); Tiana Metuarau 8/12 (67%)

Sun 22 Jul	Northern Stars	52–70	Northern Mystics	Vodafone Events Centre
4:10 pm	Maia Wilson 39/45 (87%); Paula Griffin 12/15 (80%); Ellen Halpenny 1/1 (100%)	Report; Stats	Bailey Mes 31/35 (89%); Maria Folau 29/34 (85%); Tera-Maria Amani 10/10 (100%)

Sun 22 Jul	Southern Steel	75–58	Waikato Bay of Plenty Magic	Vodafone Events Centre
6:10 pm	Jen O'Connell 51/63 (81%); Te Paea Selby-Rickit 24/27 (89%)	Report; Stats	Lenize Potgieter 42/44 (95%); Monica Falkner 16/20 (80%)

Mon 23 Jul	Northern Stars	48–66	Central Pulse	Vodafone Events Centre
7:40 pm	Maia Wilson 38/43 (88%); Ellen Halpenny 7/13 (54%); Paula Griffin 3/4 (75%)	Report; Stats	Aliyah Dunn 31/32 (97%); Ameliaranne Ekenasio 29/35 (83%); Tiana Metuarau 6/7 (86%)

Wed 25 Jul	Northern Mystics	62–44	Waikato Bay of Plenty Magic	The Trusts Arena
7:40 pm	Maria Folau 36/40 (90%); Bailey Mes 26/32 (81%)	Report; Stats	Lenize Potgieter 38/40 (95%); Monica Falkner 4/7 (57%); Amorangi Malesala 2/3 (67%)

=== Round 13 ===
Sun 29 Jul	Northern Stars	65–59	Southern Steel	Vodafone Events Centre
4:10 pm	Maia Wilson 41/44 (93%); Paula Griffin 24/26 (92%)	Report; Stats	Te Paea Selby-Rickit 48/52 (92%); Olivia Bates 11/14 (79%)

Mon 30 Jul	Waikato Bay of Plenty Magic	60–62	Mainland Tactix	Claudelands Arena
7:40 pm	Lenize Potgieter 44/47 (94%); Monica Falkner 16/18 (89%)	Report; Stats	Ellie Bird 54/61 (89%); Brooke Leaver 8/11 (73%)

Wed 1 Aug	Central Pulse	55–48	Northern Mystics	TSB Bank Arena
7:40 pm	Ameliaranne Ekenasio 30/37 (81%); Aliyah Dunn 20/24 (83%); Tiana Metuarau 5/5 (100%)	Report; Stats	Maria Folau 33/44 (75%); Bailey Mes 15/20 (75%)

=== Final ladder ===
2018 ANZ Premiership ladder
Pos	Team	P	W	L	GF	GA	GD	G%	BP	Pts
1	Central Pulse	15	12	3	850	679	+171	125.2	3	27
2	Southern Steel	15	10	5	874	866	+8	100.9	2	22
3	Mainland Tactix	15	7	8	746	761	−15	98	5	19
4	Northern Mystics	15	7	8	783	796	−13	98.4	3	17
5	Waikato Bay of Plenty Magic	15	5	10	804	878	−74	91.6	3	13
6	Northern Stars	15	4	11	832	909	−77	91.5	5	13

Qualified for Grand final and the 2018 Netball New Zealand Super Club
Qualified for Elimination final and the 2018 Netball New Zealand Super Club

== Finals Series ==
=== Elimination final ===
Wed 8 Aug; 7:45 pm	Report; Stats	Southern Steel	53–49	Mainland Tactix	ILT Stadium Southland	Sky Sport
Wed 8 Aug; 7:45 pm	Report; Stats	Scoring by quarter: 15-12, 13-17, 12-12, 13-8			ILT Stadium Southland	Sky Sport
Wed 8 Aug; 7:45 pm	Report; Stats	Jen O'Connell 38/40 (95%); Te Paea Selby-Rickit 15/22 (68%)		Ellie Bird 42/45 (93%); Kate Beveridge 4/5 (80%); Brooke Leaver 3/3 (100%)	ILT Stadium Southland	Sky Sport

=== Grand final ===
Sun 12 Aug; 4:15 pm	Central Pulse	53–54	Southern Steel	Fly Palmy Arena	Sky Sport
Sun 12 Aug; 4:15 pm	Scoring by quarter: 16–14, 14–14, 12–14, 11–16			Fly Palmy Arena	Sky Sport
Sun 12 Aug; 4:15 pm	Aliyah Dunn 32/35 (91%); Ameliaranne Ekenasio 17/25 (68%); Tiana Metuarau 4/4 (100%)		Jen O'Connell 40/44 (91%); Te Paea Selby-Rickit 14/18 (78%)	Fly Palmy Arena	Sky Sport

== Award winners ==
=== New Zealand Netball Awards ===
Award	Winner	Team
ANZ Premiership Player of the Year	Katrina Grant	Central Pulse

=== Team of the season ===
Brendon Egan selected the Stuff Seven team of the season.

Position	Player	Team
GS	Aliyah Dunn	Central Pulse
GA	Te Paea Selby-Rickit	Southern Steel
WA	Gina Crampton	Southern Steel
C	Sam Sinclair	Waikato Bay of Plenty Magic
WD	Karin Burger	Central Pulse
GD	Katrina Grant	Central Pulse
GK	Temalisi Fakahokotau	Mainland Tactix

== Season statistics ==
Goal Shooters (by %)
Pos.	Player	Team	Goal (%)
1	Lenize Potgieter	Waikato Bay of Plenty Magic	558/606 (92%)
2	Aliyah Dunn	Central Pulse	524/577 (91%)
3	Maia Wilson	Northern Stars	566/633 (89%)
4	Jennifer O'Connell	Southern Steel	563/657 (86%)
5	Tiana Metuarau	Central Pulse	185/219 (84%)

Defensive Rebounds
Pos.	Player	Team	D/Reb.
1	Temalisi Fakahokotau	Mainland Tactix	29
2	Katrina Grant	Central Pulse	26
3=	Te Huinga Reo Selby-Rickit	Southern Steel	22
3=	Sulu Fitzpatrick	Central Pulse	22
5	Kate Lloyd	Waikato Bay of Plenty Magic	19

Intercepts
Pos.	Player	Team	Inter.
1	Temalisi Fakahokotau	Mainland Tactix	55
2	Katrina Grant	Central Pulse	47
3	Anna Harrison	Northern Mystics	35
4	Phoenix Karaka	Northern Mystics	33
5	Jane Watson	Mainland Tactix	31

Centre Pass Receives
Pos.	Player	Team	CPR
1	Gina Crampton	Southern Steel	462
2	Whitney Souness	Central Pulse	339
3	Grace Kara	Northern Stars	330
4	Elisapeta Toeava	Northern Mystics	313
5	Ariana Cable-Dixon	Waikato Bay of Plenty Magic	302

Deflections
Pos.	Player	Team	Def
1	Temalisi Fakahokotau	Mainland Tactix	110
2	Anna Harrison	Northern Mystics	103
3	Katrina Grant	Central Pulse	83
4	Jane Watson	Mainland Tactix	71
5	Te Huinga Reo Selby-Rickit	Southern Steel	63
