= 2015 ANZ Championship season =

Netball league season

- League: ANZ Championship
- Sport: Netball
- Duration: 28 February – 21 June 2015
- Teams: 10
- TV partner(s): Fox Sports (Australia); Sky Sport (New Zealand); One; Te Reo; Prime TV
- Champions: Queensland Firebirds
- Winners: Australian Conference; Queensland Firebirds; New Zealand Conference; Waikato Bay of Plenty Magic; Challenge Trophy; Queensland Firebirds
- Runners-up: New South Wales Swifts
- Minor premiers: Queensland Firebirds
- Season MVP: Romelda Aiken (Firebirds); Jhaniele Fowler-Reid (Steel)
- Top scorer: Romelda Aiken (Firebirds)

ANZ Championship seasons
- ← 2014 2016 →

The 2015 ANZ Championship season was the eighth season of the ANZ Championship. The season began on 28 February and concluded on 21 June. The 2015 season saw the introduction of several major format changes and initiatives, including a Conference system, a six-team Finals Series, drawn games and a new Ranfurly Shield-style competition, the Challenge Trophy. With a team coached by Roselee Jencke, captained by Laura Geitz and featuring Romelda Aiken, Clare McMeniman and Kim Ravaillion, Queensland Firebirds won the Australian Conference, the Challenge Trophy, the minor premiership and the overall championship. Firebirds narrowly defeated New South Wales Swifts in both the Australian Conference final and the Grand Final on their way to effectively winning four titles.

== New format ==
The 2015 season saw some major format changes. The league introduced separate Australian and New Zealand conferences, a restructured six-team Finals Series and a new competition, the Challenge Trophy. Teams continued to play 13 games – eight home-and-away matches against teams in their own conference and five alternating home or away games against teams in the other conference.

The ANZ Championship also introduced draws for the first time. During the regular season, drawn games would see both teams get a point each. Extra time will only be played during the Finals Series. On 15 March, the Round 3 match between New South Wales Swifts and Queensland Firebirds finished 47–47. It was the first official draw in the eight seasons of the league.

== Transfers ==
Player	2014 team	2015 team
(England) Eboni Beckford-Chambers	West Coast Fever	Adelaide Thunderbirds
(Australia) Kristina Brice	NNSW Waratahs	Adelaide Thunderbirds
(Australia) Hannah Petty	Southern Force	Adelaide Thunderbirds
(Australia) Amy Steel	Melbourne Vixens	Adelaide Thunderbirds
(Australia) Kelsey Browne	Victorian Fury	Melbourne Vixens
(Australia) Emily Mannix	Victorian Flames	Melbourne Vixens
(Australia) Alice Teague-Neeld	Victorian Fury	Melbourne Vixens
(Australia) Carla Dziwoki	New South Wales Swifts	Melbourne Vixens
(England) Jade Clarke	Mainland Tactix	New South Wales Swifts
(Australia) Julie Corletto	Northern Mystics	New South Wales Swifts
(Australia) Erin Hoare	Melbourne Vixens	New South Wales Swifts
(Australia) Stephanie Wood	Queensland Fusion	New South Wales Swifts
(Australia) Rebecca Bulley	Adelaide Thunderbirds	Queensland Firebirds
(Australia) Beryl Friday	Queensland Fusion	Queensland Firebirds
(Australia) Caitlyn Strachan	Melbourne Vixens	Queensland Firebirds
(Australia) Gretel Tippett	New South Wales Swifts	Queensland Firebirds
(Australia) April Letton	New South Wales Swifts	West Coast Fever
(New Zealand) Erena Mikaere	Southern Steel	West Coast Fever
(Australia) Chelsea Pitman	West Coast Fever	Manchester Thunder
(New Zealand) Jodi Brown	Southern Steel	Central Pulse
(New Zealand) Ameliaranne Wells	Queensland Firebirds	Central Pulse
(Australia) Demelza Fellowes	Queensland Firebirds	Mainland Tactix
(New Zealand) Erikana Pedersen	Northern Mystics	Mainland Tactix
(New Zealand) Bailey Mes	Northern Mystics	Mainland Tactix
(New Zealand) Paula Griffin	Central Pulse	Northern Mystics
(England) Serena Guthrie	Team Bath	Northern Mystics
(New Zealand) Camilla Lees	Central Pulse	Northern Mystics
(New Zealand) Sulu Tone-Fitzpatrick		Northern Mystics
(New Zealand) Sophia Fenwick	Mainland Tactix	Southern Steel
(New Zealand) Jane Watson	Mainland Tactix	Southern Steel
(New Zealand) Kelly Jury		Waikato Bay of Plenty Magic

== Head coaches and captains ==
Team	Head coach	Captain
Adelaide Thunderbirds	Jane Woodlands-Thompson	Renae Hallinan
Melbourne Vixens	Simone McKinnis	Bianca Chatfield
New South Wales Swifts	Rob Wright	Kimberlee Green
Queensland Firebirds	Roselee Jencke	Laura Geitz
West Coast Fever	Stacey Rosman	Ashleigh Brazill
Central Pulse	Robyn Broughton	Katrina Grant
Mainland Tactix	Sue Hawkins	Anna Thompson
Northern Mystics	Debbie Fuller	Maria Tutaia
Southern Steel	Janine Southby	Wendy Frew
Waikato Bay of Plenty Magic	Julie Fitzgerald	Leana De Bruin

== Summer Shootout ==
Between 6 and 8 February, New South Wales Swifts hosted the Summer Shootout at Netball Central, Sydney Olympic Park. This was the first major netball tournament to be held at the venue. All ten ANZ Championship teams participated in the three-day tournament. A total of 25 games, consisting of both full length and shortened games consisting of two 15-minute periods, were played over the weekend.

== Regular season ==
=== Round 1 ===
Sat 28 February	Adelaide Thunderbirds	44–45	Waikato Bay of Plenty Magic	Netball SA Stadium
1:48 PM (ACDT)	Carla Borrego 23/32 (72%); Erin Bell 21/25 (84%)	Report; Stats	Joanne Harten 25/34 (74%); Malia Paseka 14/18 (78%); Ellen Halpenny 6/13 (46%)

Sun 1 March	Queensland Firebirds	50–57	West Coast Fever	Brisbane Convention and Exhibition Centre
11:18 AM (AEST)	Romelda Aiken ? Amy Wild ?	Report	Caitlin Bassett 44; Natalie Medhurst ?

Sun 1 March	Melbourne Vixens	64–40	Central Pulse	Margaret Court Arena
2:18 PM (AEDT)	Tegan Philip 35/41 (85%); Karyn Bailey 29/35 (83%)	Report; Stats	Jodi Brown 24/29 (83%); Irene van Dyk 13/14 (93%); Ameliaranne Wells 3/7 (43%)

Sun 1 March	Southern Steel	62–68	New South Wales Swifts	Stadium Southland
7.10 PM (NZDT)	Jhaniele Fowler-Reid 46/55 (84%); Te Paea Selby-Rickit 16/19 (84%)	Report	Susan Pettitt 29/32 (91%); Caitlin Thwaites 39/43 (91%)

Mon 2 March	Mainland Tactix	53–59	Northern Mystics	Horncastle Arena
7.40 PM (NZDT)	Mwai Kumwenda 36/40 (90%); Bailey Mes 12/16 (75%) ?? ?	Report	Maria Tutaia 23/28 (82%); Cathrine Latu 32/35 (91%); Elsa Brown 4/7 (57%)

=== Round 2 ===
Sat 7 March	Southern Steel	68–54	Mainland Tactix	Stadium Southland
4:10 PM (NZDT)	Jhaniele Fowler-Reid 56/60 (93%); Te Paea Selby-Rickit 8/11 (73%); Sophia Fenwick 4/11 (36%)	Report	Mwai Kumwenda 34/38 (89%); Bailey Mes 17/24 (71%); Gemma Hazeldine 3/5 (60%)

Sun 8 March	Melbourne Vixens	48–39	Adelaide Thunderbirds	Hisense Arena
12:18 PM (AEDT)	Tegan Philip 13/21 (62%); Karyn Bailey 30; Carla Dziwoki 5/5 (100%)	Report; Stats	Carla Borrego 13/25 (52%); Erin Bell 17/25 (68%); Kristina Brice 9/14 (64%)

Sun 8 March	West Coast Fever	67–51	Northern Mystics	HBF Stadium
11:18 AM (AWST)	Caitlin Bassett 51/61 (84%); Natalie Medhurst 16/17 (94%)	Report	Maria Tutaia 22/30 (73%); Catherine Latu 18; Paula Griffin 11/14 (79%)

Sun 8 March	Central Pulse	46–52	Queensland Firebirds	Te Rauparaha Arena
7:10 PM (NZDT)	Jodi Brown 27; Irene van Dyk 19	Report	Romelda Aiken 37; Amy Wild 15

Mon 9 March	Waikato Bay of Plenty Magic	43–48	New South Wales Swifts	ASB Arena
7:40 PM (NZDT)	Joanne Harten 15; Malia Paseka 10/17 (59%); Ellen Halpenny 18/25 (72%)	Report	Susan Pettitt 7/10 (70%); Caitlin Thwaites 34/42 (81%); Stephanie Wood 7/10 (70%)

=== Round 3 ===
Sat 14 March	West Coast Fever	67–60	Southern Steel	HBF Stadium
7.18 PM (AWST)	Caitlin Bassett 50/57 (88%); Natalie Medhurst 17/18 (94%)	Report; Stats	Jhaniele Fowler-Reid 47/51 (92%); Te Paea Selby-Rickit 11/17 (65%); Sophia Fenwick ?

Sun 15 March	New South Wales Swifts	47–47	Queensland Firebirds	Sydney Olympic Park Sports Centre
12.18 PM (AEDT)	Susan Pettitt 29/37 (78%); Caitlin Thwaites 18/22 (82%)	Report	Romelda Aiken 36/46 (78%); Gretel Tippett 11/14 (79%)

Sun 15 March	Adelaide Thunderbirds	51–51	Northern Mystics	Netball SA Stadium
1:48 PM (ACDT)	Carla Borrego 34/41 (83%); Erin Bell 17	Report	Maria Tutaia 23; Catherine Latu 28/29 (97%)

Sun 15 March	Waikato Bay of Plenty Magic	48–51	Melbourne Vixens	ASB Arena
7.10 PM (NZDT)	Malia Paseka 23/34 (68%); Ellen Halpenny 25/34 (74%)	Report	Tegan Philip 17/25 (68%); Karyn Bailey 34/38 (89%)

Mon 16 March	Mainland Tactix	41–48	Central Pulse	Horncastle Arena
7:40 PM (NZDT)	Mwai Kumwenda 26/29 (90%); Bailey Mes 15/26 (58%); Gemma Hazeldine 0/1 (0%)	Report	Jodi Brown 18/27 (67%); Irene van Dyk 16/21 (76%); Ameliaranne Wells 14/17 (82%)

=== Round 4 ===
Sun 22 March	Adelaide Thunderbirds	47–45	Melbourne Vixens	Netball SA Stadium
11.48 AM (ACDT)	Carla Borrego 24; Erin Bell 23	Report	Tegan Philip 18; Karyn Bailey 23; Carla Dziwoki 4

Sun 22 March	Waikato Bay of Plenty Magic	52–49	Mainland Tactix	Claudelands Arena
7.10 PM (NZDT)	Joanne Harten 30/32 (94%); Malia Paseka 11/16 (69%); Ellen Halpenny 11/14 (79%)	Report	Mwai Kumwenda 36/41 (88%); Bailey Mes 0/1 (0%); Gemma Hazeldine 13/17 (76%)

Mon 23 March	Northern Mystics	49–44	Central Pulse	The Trusts Arena
7.40 PM (NZDT)	Maria Tutaia 21; Catherine Latu 28	Report	Jodi Brown 28; Irene van Dyk 5 Ameliaranne Wells 11

Mon 23 March	New South Wales Swifts	59–59	West Coast Fever	Sydney Olympic Park Sports Centre
7.18 PM (AEDT)	Susan Pettitt 23; Caitlin Thwaites 36	Report	Caitlin Bassett 51; Natalie Medhurst 8

BYES: Queensland Firebirds and Southern Steel

=== Round 5 ===
Sun 29 March	West Coast Fever	55–50	Adelaide Thunderbirds	HBF Stadium
9:18 PM (AWST)	Caitlin Bassett 40/44 (91%); Natalie Medhurst 15/17 (88%)	Report	Carla Borrego 35/45 (78%); Erin Bell 15/23 (65%)

Sun 29 March	Northern Mystics	57–52	Southern Steel	The Trusts Arena
7:10 PM (NZDT)	Maria Tutaia 23/25 (92%); Catherine Latu 34/37 (92%)	Report	Jhaniele Fowler-Reid 38/48 (79%); Te Paea Selby-Rickit 14/17 (82%)

Mon 30 March	Central Pulse	49–38	Waikato Bay of Plenty Magic	TSB Bank Arena
7:40 PM (NZDT)	Jodi Brown 25/30 (83%); Irene van Dyk 24/30 (80%)	Report	Joanne Harten 25/30 (83%); Malia Paseka 2/3 (67%); Ellen Halpenny 11/13 (85%)

Mon 30 March	Queensland Firebirds	51–47	New South Wales Swifts	Brisbane Convention and Exhibition Centre
7:18 PM (AEST)	Romelda Aiken 43; Gretel Tippett ?	Report	Susan Pettitt ? Caitlin Thwaites ?

BYES: Melbourne Vixens and Mainland Tactix

=== Round 6 Easter Round ===
Sun 5 April	Queensland Firebirds	48–46	Adelaide Thunderbirds	Brisbane Convention and Exhibition Centre
12:18 PM (AEST)	Romelda Aiken 26/32 (81%); Gretel Tippett 22	Report; Stats	Carla Borrego 30/32 (94%); Erin Bell 16	Attendance: 3,150

Sun 5 April	Waikato Bay of Plenty Magic	45–45	Northern Mystics	Energy Events Centre
7:10 PM (NZST)	Joanne Harten 23/27 (85%); Ellen Halpenny 21/26 (81%); Malia Paseka ?	Report	Maria Tutaia ? Catherine Latu 15/15 (100%); Paula Griffin ?

Mon 6 April	West Coast Fever	53–47	Melbourne Vixens	HBF Stadium
2:18 PM (AWST)	Caitlin Bassett 34/42 (81%); Natalie Medhurst 19/20 (95%)	Report	Tegan Philip 23/28 (82%); Karyn Bailey 24/28 (86%)

Mon 6 April	Mainland Tactix	58–84	Southern Steel	Horncastle Arena
7:40 PM (NZST)	Mwai Kumwenda 38/41 (93%); Gemma Hazeldine 11/14 (79%); Bailey Mes 9/15 (60%)	Report	Jhaniele Fowler-Reid 58/66 (88%); Te Paea Selby-Rickit 15/17 (88%); Sophia Fenwick 9/12 (75%); Brooke Leaver 2/3 (67%)

BYES: New South Wales Swifts and Central Pulse

=== Round 7 ===
Sat 11 April	Southern Steel	57–63	Waikato Bay of Plenty Magic	Stadium Southland
4:10 PM (NZST)	Jhaniele Fowler-Reid 42/51 (82%); Te Paea Selby-Rickit 15/20 (75%)	Report	Joanne Harten 42/47 (89%); Ellen Halpenny 21/26 (81%)

Sun 12 April	Melbourne Vixens	48–55	Queensland Firebirds	Hisense Arena
12:18 PM (AEST)	Tegan Philip 27/30 (90%); Karyn Bailey 21/24 (88%)	Report	Romelda Aiken 37/46 (80%); Gretel Tippett 18/26 (69%)

Sun 12 April	Adelaide Thunderbirds	56–49	New South Wales Swifts	Netball SA Stadium
1:48 PM (ACST)	Carla Borrego 39/46 (85%); Erin Bell ?	Report; Stats	Susan Pettitt ? Caitlin Thwaites ? Erin Hoare ?

Sun 12 April	Mainland Tactix	51–66	West Coast Fever	Marlborough Lines Stadium, Blenheim
7:10 PM (NZST)	Mwai Kumwenda 34/36 (94%); Bailey Mes 13/20 (65%); Gemma Hazeldine 4/8 (50%)	Report; Stats	Caitlin Bassett 49/57 (86%); Natalie Medhurst 17/19 (89%)

Mon 13 April	Central Pulse	45–47	Northern Mystics	TSB Bank Arena
7:40 PM (NZST)	Jodi Brown 28/32 (88%); Irene van Dyk 6/10 (60%); Ameliaranne Wells 11/15 (73%)	Report	Maria Tutaia 22/30 (73%); Catherine Latu 13/13 (100%); Paula Griffin 12/13 (92%)

=== Round 8 ===
Sat 18 April	Queensland Firebirds	50–42	Waikato Bay of Plenty Magic	Brisbane Convention and Exhibition Centre
2:18 PM (AEST)	Romelda Aiken 40/49 (82%); Gretel Tippett 10/17 (59%)	Report	Joanne Harten 29/34 (85%); Ellen Halpenny 10/15 (67%); Malia Paseka 3/6 (50%)

Sun 19 April	New South Wales Swifts	66–50	Northern Mystics	Sydney Olympic Park Sports Centre
12:18 PM (AEST)	Susan Pettitt ? Caitlin Thwaites 30/33 (91%)	Report; Stats	Maria Tutaia ? Catherine Latu ? Paula Griffin 10/16 (63%)

Sun 19 April	Melbourne Vixens	63–54	Southern Steel	Hisense Arena
2:18 PM (AEST)	Tegan Philip 22/25 (88%); Karyn Bailey 41/49 (84%)	Report	Jhaniele Fowler-Reid 37/41 (90%); Te Paea Selby-Rickit 17/21 (81%)

Sun 19 April	Central Pulse	48–51	West Coast Fever	TSB Bank Arena
7:10 PM (NZST)	Jodi Brown 31/37 (84%); Ameliaranne Wells 17/26 (65%)	Report	Caitlin Bassett 41/45 (91%); Natalie Medhurst 10/13 (77%)

Mon 20 April	Mainland Tactix	51–63	Adelaide Thunderbirds	Horncastle Arena
7:40 PM (NZST)	Mwai Kumwenda 25/27 (93%); Bailey Mes 26/36 (72%)	Report	Carla Borrego 37/46 (80%); Erin Bell 25/27 (93%)

=== Round 9 ANZAC Round ===
Sat 25 April	Central Pulse	47–47	New South Wales Swifts	TSB Bank Arena
4:10 PM (NZST)	Jodi Brown 21/25 (84%); Ameliaranne Wells 26/33 (79%)	Report	Susan Pettitt 22/26 (85%); Caitlin Thwaites 25/29 (86%)

Sun 26 April	West Coast Fever	54–49	Waikato Bay of Plenty Magic	HBF Stadium
10:18 PM (AWST)	Caitlin Bassett 39/54 (72%); Natalie Medhurst 15/20 (75%) ?	Report	Joanne Harten 35/40 (88%); Ellen Halpenny 2 ? Malia Paseka 12/12 (100%)

Sun 26 April	Melbourne Vixens	56–52	Mainland Tactix	Hisense Arena
2:18 PM (AEST)	Tegan Philip 26/33 (79%); Karyn Bailey 30/33 (91%)	Report	Mwai Kumwenda 17/20 (85%); Bailey Mes 32/35 (91%); Gemma Hazeldine 3/5 (60%)

Sun 26 April	Northern Mystics	47–53	Queensland Firebirds	The Trusts Arena
7:10 PM (NZST)	Maria Tutaia 28/30 (93%); Cathrine Latu 15/15 (100%); Paula Griffin 4 ?	Report	Romelda Aiken 42/53 (79%); Gretel Tippett 11/19 (58%)

Mon 27 April	Southern Steel	53–53	Adelaide Thunderbirds	More FM Arena
7:40 PM (NZST)	Jhaniele Fowler-Reid 40/45 (89%); Te Paea Selby-Rickit 5/7 (71%); Brooke Leaver 8/11 (73%)	Report	Carla Borrego 38/45 (84%); Erin Bell 15/21 (71%)

=== Round 10 ===
Fri 1 May	West Coast Fever	48–56	Queensland Firebirds	Perth Arena
7:18 PM (AWST)	Caitlin Bassett 35/39 (90%); Natalie Medhurst 13/15 (87%)	Report	Romelda Aiken 47/57 (82%); Gretel Tippett 9/18 (50%)

Sat 2 May	Southern Steel	50–49	Central Pulse	More FM Arena
4:10 PM (NZST)	Jhaniele Fowler-Reid 35/44 (80%); Te Paea Selby-Rickit 15/18 (83%)	Report	Jodi Brown 31/33 (94%); Ameliaranne Wells 11/15 (73%); Irene van Dyk 7/9 (78%)

Sun 3 May	New South Wales Swifts	67–43	Melbourne Vixens	Allphones Arena
12:18 PM (AEST)	Susan Pettitt 28/30 (93%); Caitlin Thwaites 39/41 (95%)	Report	Tegan Philip ? Karyn Bailey ?	Attendance: 10,370

Sun 3 May	Northern Mystics	61–53	Mainland Tactix	The Trusts Arena
7:10 PM (NZST)	Maria Tutaia 24/30 (80%); Cathrine Latu 37/41 (90%)	Report	Mwai Kumwenda 40/43 (93%); Bailey Mes 9/14 (64%); Gemma Hazeldine 4/8 (50%)

BYES: Adelaide Thunderbirds and Waikato Bay of Plenty Magic

=== Round 11 ===
Sun 10 May	Queensland Firebirds	54–45	Melbourne Vixens	Gold Coast Convention and Exhibition Centre
12:18 PM (AEST)	Romelda Aiken 38/44 (86%); Gretel Tippett 16/25 (64%)	Report	Tegan Philip 21/25 (84%); Karyn Bailey 24/30 (80%)	Attendance: 4,444

Sun 10 May	New South Wales Swifts	65–54	Adelaide Thunderbirds	Sydney Olympic Park Sports Centre
2:18 PM (AEST)	Susan Pettitt 27/31 (87%); Caitlin Thwaites 38/42 (90%)	Report	Carla Borrego 39/47 (83%); Erin Bell 15/17 (88%)

Sun 10 May	Waikato Bay of Plenty Magic	59–53	Southern Steel	Claudelands Arena
7:10 PM (NZST)	Joanne Harten 46/53 (87%); Ellen Halpenny 4/4 (100%); Malia Paseka 9/12 (75%)	Report	Jhaniele Fowler-Reid 38/44 (86%); Te Paea Selby-Rickit 15/16 (94%)

Mon 11 May	Central Pulse	51–48	Mainland Tactix	Te Rauparaha Arena
7:40 PM (NZST)	Jodi Brown 18/22 (82%); Ameliaranne Wells 33/40 (83%)	Report	Mwai Kumwenda 30/31 (97%); Bailey Mes 16/23 (70%); Gemma Hazeldine 2/3 (67%)

BYES: West Coast Fever and Northern Mystics

=== Round 12 ===
Sat 16 May	Adelaide Thunderbirds	42–58	Queensland Firebirds	Adelaide Arena
7:18 PM (ACST)	Carla Borrego 40; Erin Bell 18	Report	Romelda Aiken 26; Gretel Tippett 16	Attendance: 5,000

Sun 17 May	Melbourne Vixens	56–48	West Coast Fever	Margaret Court Arena
12:18 PM (AEST)	Tegan Philip 17/24 (71%); Karyn Bailey 39/42 (93%)	Report	Caitlin Bassett 35/38 (92%); Natalie Medhurst 13/17 (76%)	Attendance: 5,380

Sun 17 May	New South Wales Swifts	68–49	Mainland Tactix	Sydney Olympic Park Sports Centre
2:18 PM (AEST)	Susan Pettitt 32/34 (94%); Caitlin Thwaites 31/35 (89%); Stephanie Wood 5/6 (83%)	Report	Mwai Kumwenda 33/35 (94%); Bailey Mes 16/21 (76%)

Sun 17 May	Central Pulse	55–55	Southern Steel	Arena Manawatu
7:10 PM (NZST)	Jodi Brown 20/22 (91%); Ameliaranne Wells 35/41 (85%)	Report	Jhaniele Fowler-Reid 40/46 (87%); Te Paea Selby-Rickit 12/16 (75%); Brooke Leaver 3/3 (100%)

Mon 18 May	Northern Mystics	54–49	Waikato Bay of Plenty Magic	The Trusts Arena
7:40 PM (NZST)	Maria Tutaia 24/31 (77%); Catherine Latu 30/31 (97%)	Report	Joanne Harten 35/45 (78%); Malia Paseka 14/19 (74%)

=== Round 13 ===
Sat 23 May	Southern Steel	61–63	Northern Mystics	Stadium Southland
4:10 PM (NZST)	Jhaniele Fowler-Reid 43/45 (96%); Te Paea Selby-Rickit 15/17 (88%); Brooke Leaver 3/5 (60%)	Report	Maria Tutaia 19/24 (79%); Catherine Latu 44/49 (90%)

Sun 24 May	Adelaide Thunderbirds	61–63	West Coast Fever	Netball SA Stadium
11:48 AM (ACST)	Carla Borrego 44/50 (88%); Erin Bell ?	Report	Caitlin Bassett 52/56 (93%); Natalie Medhurst ?

Sun 24 May	Melbourne Vixens	48–52	New South Wales Swifts	Margaret Court Arena
2:18 PM (AEST)	Tegan Philip 21/27 (78%); Karyn Bailey 27/32 (84%)	Report	Susan Pettitt 23/27 (85%); Caitlin Thwaites 29/38 (76%)

Sun 24 May	Mainland Tactix	43–68	Queensland Firebirds	Marlborough Lines Stadium, Blenheim
7:10 PM (NZST)	Mwai Kumwenda 22/25 (88%); Bailey Mes 21/25 (84%)	Report	Romelda Aiken 52/67 (78%); Gretel Tippett 10/17 (59%); Amy Wild 6/9 (67%)

Mon 25 May	Waikato Bay of Plenty Magic	52–47	Central Pulse	Claudelands Arena
7:40 PM (NZST)	Joanne Harten 39/39 (100%); Malia Paseka 13/15 (87%); Ellen Halpenny 0/2 (0%)	Report	Jodi Brown 18/20 (90%); Ameliaranne Wells 29/35 (83%)

=== Round 14 ===
Sat 30 May	West Coast Fever	56–63	New South Wales Swifts	Perth Arena
10:18 AM (AWST)	Caitlin Bassett 44/51 (86%); Natalie Medhurst 12/15 (80%)	Report	Susan Pettitt 28/32 (88%); Caitlin Thwaites 35/37 (95%)	Attendance: 9,703

Sun 31 May	Adelaide Thunderbirds	62–51	Central Pulse	Netball SA Stadium
11:48 AM (ACST)	Carla Borrego 42/47 (89%); Erin Bell 20/25 (80%)	Report; Stats	Jodi Brown 22/31 (71%); Ameliaranne Wells 16/16 (100%); Irene van Dyk 13/15 (87%)

Sun 31 May	Queensland Firebirds	66–50	Southern Steel	Brisbane Convention and Exhibition Centre
2:18 PM (AEST)	Romelda Aiken 49/60 (82%); Gretel Tippett 17/29 (59%)	Report	Jhaniele Fowler-Reid 29/36 (81%); Te Paea Selby-Rickit 17/24 (71%); Brooke Leaver 4/4 (100%)

Sun 31 May	Mainland Tactix	62–58	Waikato Bay of Plenty Magic	Horncastle Arena
7:10 PM (NZST)	Mwai Kumwenda 39/44 (89%); Bailey Mes 22/24 (92%)	Report	Joanne Harten 52/58 (90%); Malia Paseka 2/3 (67%); Ellen Halpenny 4/6 (67%)

Mon 1 June	Northern Mystics	48–56	Melbourne Vixens	The Trusts Arena
7:40 PM (NZST)	Maria Tutaia 16/30 (53%); Cathrine Latu 9/10 (90%); Paula Griffin 23/28 (82%)	Report; Stats	Tegan Philip ? Karyn Bailey ?

=== Final standings ===
2015 Australian Conference
Pos	Team	Pld	W	D	L	GF	GA	G%	Pts
1	Queensland Firebirds	13	11	1	1	708	608	116.4%	23
2	New South Wales Swifts	13	8	3	2	746	665	112.2%	19
3	West Coast Fever	13	9	1	3	744	701	106.1%	19
4	Melbourne Vixens	13	7	0	6	670	657	102.0%	14
5	Adelaide Thunderbirds	13	4	2	7	667	682	97.8%	10
2015 New Zealand Conference
Pos	Team	Pld	W	D	L	GF	GA	G%	Pts
1	Northern Mystics	13	7	2	4	682	695	98.1%	16
2	Waikato Bay of Plenty Magic	13	5	1	7	643	663	97.0%	11
3	Southern Steel	13	3	2	8	759	775	97.9%	8
4	Central Pulse	13	3	2	8	620	656	94.5%	8
5	Mainland Tactix	13	1	0	12	664	801	82.9%	2

Qualified for Conference finals
Qualified for Elimination finals

- Pld = Games played
- W = Win (2 points)
- D = Draw (1 points)
- L = Loss (0 points)
- GF = Goals For
- GA = Goals Against
- G% = Goal percentage (= 100 × GF/GA)
- Pts = Points

=== Challenge Trophy ===
The 2015 season saw the introduction of the Ranfurly Shield-style, Challenge Trophy. The trophy was available to win every time the holder played at home. Once a visiting team defeats the title holders, the trophy is theirs to protect and hold against all challengers in every home game during the regular season until they are beaten. A pre-season draw saw West Coast Fever declared the inaugural holder and they defended the trophy for first time on 8 March in Round 2 against Northern Mystics. Fever subsequently enjoyed a nine-game unbeaten run in the league. They retained the Challenge Trophy until Round 10 when they were defeated 56–48 by Queensland Firebirds. Firebirds defended the trophy in Round 11 against Melbourne Vixens and in Round 14 against Southern Steel, finishing the season as trophy holders.

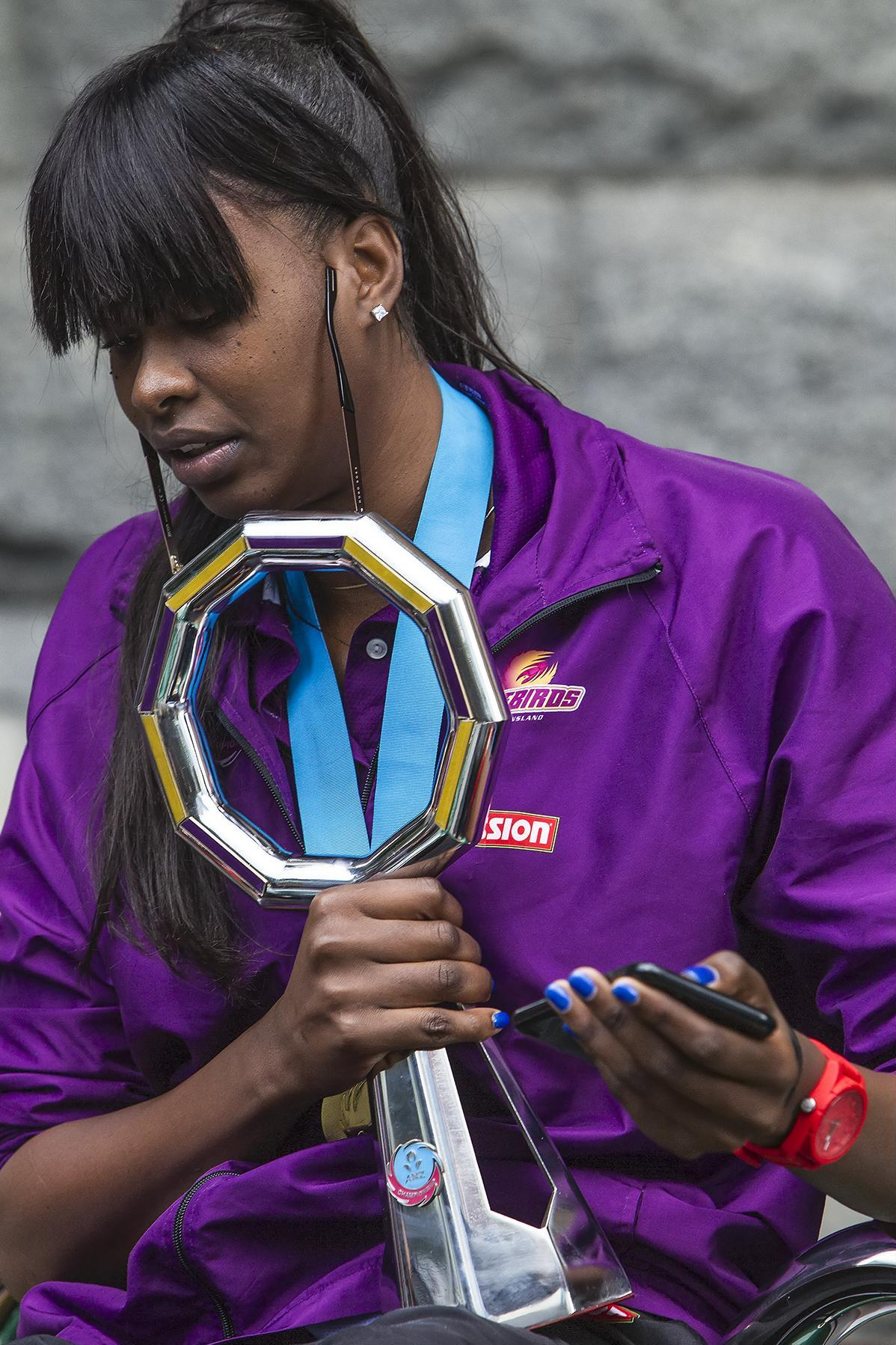
27 June 2015; Romelda Aiken (Queensland Firebirds) with the ANZ Championship Challenge Trophy.

Round	Holders	Score	Challengers
Round 2	West Coast Fever	67–51	Northern Mystics
Round 3	West Coast Fever	67–60	Southern Steel
Round 5	West Coast Fever	55–50	Adelaide Thunderbirds
Round 6	West Coast Fever	53–47	Melbourne Vixens
Round 9	West Coast Fever	54–49	Waikato Bay of Plenty Magic
Round 10	West Coast Fever	48–56	Queensland Firebirds
Round 11	Queensland Firebirds	54–45	Melbourne Vixens
Round 14	Queensland Firebirds	66–50	Southern Steel

== Finals series ==
The new Conference format saw the top three teams from each Conference qualify for the Finals Series. The second and third placed teams from each Conference played off in the Elimination Final. The winner then took on the first placed team in the Conference Final. The four Conference finalists will then progress to the semi-finals where the Conference Champions hosted the runner up of the other conference for a chance to compete in the ANZ Championship Grand Final.

=== Australian Conference ===
Elimination Final

Fri 5 June; 7:18 PM (AEST)	Stats	New South Wales Swifts	60–53	West Coast Fever	Sydney Olympic Park Sports Centre
Fri 5 June; 7:18 PM (AEST)	Stats	Caitlin Thwaites 32/34 (94%); Susan Pettitt 28/29 (97%)		Caitlin Bassett 37/40 (93%); Natalie Medhurst 16/18 (89%)	Sydney Olympic Park Sports Centre

Conference Final

Sun 7 June; 12:18 PM (AEST)	Stats	Queensland Firebirds	55–44	New South Wales Swifts	Brisbane Entertainment Centre; Attendance: 5,175
Sun 7 June; 12:18 PM (AEST)	Stats	Romelda Aiken 36/39 (92%); Gretel Tippett ?		Susan Pettitt ? Caitlin Thwaites 17/21 (81%); Stephanie Wood ?	Brisbane Entertainment Centre; Attendance: 5,175

=== New Zealand Conference ===
Elimination Final

Sat 6 June; 3:10 PM (NZST)	Stats	Waikato Bay of Plenty Magic	71–69	Southern Steel	Claudelands Arena
Sat 6 June; 3:10 PM (NZST)	Stats	Joanne Harten 53/60 (88%); Malia Paseka ? Ellen Halpenny ?		Jhaniele Fowler-Reid 58/64 (91%); Te Paea Selby-Rickit ?	Claudelands Arena

Conference Final

Mon 8 June; 7:40 PM (NZST)	Stats	Northern Mystics	54–57	Waikato Bay of Plenty Magic	The Trusts Arena
Mon 8 June; 7:40 PM (NZST)	Stats	Maria Tutaia 28/32 (88%); Cathrine Latu 26/27 (96%)		Joanne Harten 35/38 (92%); Malia Paseka 22/26 (85%)	The Trusts Arena

=== Semi-finals ===
Sun 14 June; 12:18 PM (AEST)	Stats	Queensland Firebirds	60–44	Northern Mystics	Brisbane Convention and Exhibition Centre; Attendance: 3,200
Sun 14 June; 12:18 PM (AEST)	Stats	Romelda Aiken 42/48 (88%); Gretel Tippett 18/27 (67%)		Maria Tutaia 24/33 (73%); Cathrine Latu 17/18 (94%); Paula Griffin 3 ?	Brisbane Convention and Exhibition Centre; Attendance: 3,200

Sun 14 June; 7:10 PM (NZST)	Stats	Waikato Bay of Plenty Magic	52–60	New South Wales Swifts	Claudelands Arena; Attendance: 4,200
Sun 14 June; 7:10 PM (NZST)	Stats	Joanne Harten 39/44 (89%); Malia Paseka ? Ellen Halpenny ?		Susan Pettitt 27/29 (93%); Caitlin Thwaites 33/36 (92%)	Claudelands Arena; Attendance: 4,200

=== Grand Final ===
Sun 21 June; 12:10 PM (AEST)	Stats	Queensland Firebirds	57–56	New South Wales Swifts	Brisbane Entertainment Centre	Fox Sports; Sky Sport
Sun 21 June; 12:10 PM (AEST)	Stats	Romelda Aiken 47/51 (92%); Gretel Tippett 10/17 (59%)		Susan Pettitt 26/28 (93%); Caitlin Thwaites 30/34 (88%)	Brisbane Entertainment Centre	Fox Sports; Sky Sport

== Award winners ==
=== ANZ Championship awards ===
Award	Winner	Team
ANZ Championship MVP	(Jamaica) Romelda Aiken ^{(Note 1)}	Queensland Firebirds
ANZ Championship MVP	(Jamaica) Jhaniele Fowler-Reid ^{(Note 1)}	Southern Steel
ANZ Championship Finals Series MVP	(Australia) Sharni Layton	New South Wales Swifts
ANZ Championship Best New Talent	(England) Serena Guthrie	Northern Mystics

Notes

^1 Romelda Aiken was the MVP player in the Australian Conference and Jhaniele Fowler-Reid was the MVP player in the New Zealand Conference.

=== All Star Team ===
Position	Player	Team
GS	(Australia) Caitlin Bassett	West Coast Fever
GA	(Australia) Susan Pettitt	New South Wales Swifts
WA	(Australia) Kimberlee Green	New South Wales Swifts
C	(Australia) Kim Ravaillion	Queensland Firebirds
WD	(England) Serena Guthrie	Northern Mystics
GD	(Australia) Julie Corletto	New South Wales Swifts
GK	(Australia) Sharni Layton	New South Wales Swifts
Coach	(Australia) Stacey Rosman	West Coast Fever

=== Australian Netball Awards ===
Award	Winner	Team
Australian ANZ Championship Player of the Year	Sharni Layton	New South Wales Swifts
Liz Ellis Diamond	Caitlin Bassett	West Coast Fever
Australian ANZ Championship Coach of the Year	Roselee Jencke	Queensland Firebirds

=== New Zealand Netball Awards ===
Award	Winner	Team
New Zealand ANZ Championship Player of the Year	Laura Langman	Northern Mystics
New Zealand ANZ Championship Coach of the Year	Julie Fitzgerald	Waikato Bay of Plenty Magic

== Statistics ==
=== Top scorers ===
Player	Team	GS/GA/G%
(Jamaica) Romelda Aiken	Queensland Firebirds	648/779 (83%)
(Jamaica) Jhaniele Fowler-Reid	Southern Steel	607/697 (87%)
(Australia) Caitlin Bassett	West Coast Fever	600/687 (87%)
(Australia) Caitlin Thwaites	New South Wales Swifts	506/574 (88%)
(Jamaica) Carla Borrego	Adelaide Thunderbirds	425/523 (81%)
(Australia) Susan Pettitt	New South Wales Swifts	422/481 (88%)
(Australia) Karyn Bailey	Melbourne Vixens	384/444 (86%)
(Malawi) Mwai Kumwenda	Mainland Tactix	371/405 (92%)
(New Zealand) Cathrine Latu	Northern Mystics	360/384 (94%)
(New Zealand) Maria Tutaia	Northern Mystics	345/363 (95%)

=== Top rebounds ===
Player	Team	Rebounds
(Jamaica) Romelda Aiken	Queensland Firebirds	110
(Jamaica) Jhaniele Fowler-Reid	Southern Steel	60
(Jamaica) Carla Borrego	Adelaide Thunderbirds	57
(Australia) Sharni Layton	New South Wales Swifts	39
(Australia) Caitlin Bassett	West Coast Fever	35
(New Zealand) Jodi Brown	Central Pulse	35
(Australia) Laura Geitz	Queensland Firebirds	33
(Australia) Karyn Bailey	Melbourne Vixens	28
(Malawi) Mwai Kumwenda	Mainland Tactix	26

== Media coverage ==
All 72 games were broadcast live on Fox Sports (Australia). Their commentary team included Liz Ellis, Sharelle McMahon, Catherine Cox and Kelli Underwood. Sunday afternoon's Match Of The Round were also broadcast live on One. Sky Sport (New Zealand) remained as the principal broadcast partner in New Zealand. Māori Television broadcast one full match replay on Te Reo while Prime TV showed highlights.
