= Te Paea Selby-Rickit =

New Zealand netball international

Personal information
- Born: 14 January 1992 (age 34) Ōtaki, New Zealand
- Height: 1.88 m (6 ft 2 in)
- Relatives: Hud Rickit (father); Te Huinga Reo Selby-Rickit (sister); Manaaki Selby-Rickit (brother)
- University: University of Otago

Netball career
- Playing positions: GS, GA
Years	Club team	Apps
2011–2019	Southern Steel	93
2019–2025	Mainland Tactix	
2026-	Queensland Firebirds	
Years	National team	Caps
2016–	New Zealand	66
Medal record
Representing New Zealand
Netball World Cup
Gold medal – first place	2019 Liverpool	Team
Fast5 Netball World Series
Gold medal – first place	2016 Melbourne	Team
Commonwealth Games
Bronze medal – third place	2022 Birmingham	Team

Te Paea Selby-Rickit (born 14 January 1992) is a New Zealand netball international. She was a member of the New Zealand teams that won the 2019 Netball World Cup. She has also represented New Zealand at the 2018 and the 2022 Commonwealth Games and the 2023 Netball World Cup. She was a member of two premiership winning teams – the 2017 and 2018 Southern Steel teams. She was also a member of the Steel team that won the 2017 Netball New Zealand Super Club tournament. Since 2019 she has played for Mainland Tactix. Her older sister, Te Huinga Reo Selby-Rickit, is a former New Zealand netball international. Her father, Hud Rickit, is a former New Zealand rugby union international.

== Early life, family and education ==
Selby-Rickit is a Māori with Ngāti Raukawa, Ngāti Tūwharetoa and Ngāti Porou affiliations. She was born and raised in Ōtaki. She is the daughter of Mereana Selby and Hud Rickit. Her mother is the CEO at Te Wānanga o Raukawa. Her father is a former New Zealand rugby union international. She has four siblings. Her older sister, Te Huinga Reo Selby-Rickit, is a former New Zealand netball international. They were teammates at Southern Steel. A third sister, Miriama, also played netball at National Provincial Championship level. Her brothers, Manaaki Selby-Rickit and Ngarongo Selby-Rickit, are both rugby union players. The five siblings were all educated at kura kaupapa and were raised speaking te reo Māori. Between 2010 and 2018, Selby-Rickit attended the University of Otago where she trained to be a teacher at the College of Education.

== Playing career ==
=== Southern Steel ===
Between 2011 and 2019, Selby-Rickit made 93 senior appearances for Southern Steel, initially in the ANZ Championship and later in the ANZ Premiership. Her 2011 teammates included her older sister, Te Huinga Reo Selby-Rickit. On 14 February 2011, Selby-Rickit made her ANZ Championship debut for Steel in a Round 1 match against Northern Mystics, acting as cover for an injured Daneka Wipiiti. Between 2011 and 2014, she made just 18 appearances for the Steel, finding herself behind Jodi Brown and Donna Wilkins when it came to selection. On 19 April 2017, Selby-Rickit made her 50th senior league appearance for Steel in a Round 4 match against Mainland Tactix. Together with Te Huinga, she was subsequently a prominent member of the Steel teams that won the 2017 and 2018 ANZ Premierships and the 2017 Netball New Zealand Super Club tournament.

=== Mainland Tactix ===
Since 2019, Selby-Rickit has played for Mainland Tactix. On 13 July 2020, she made her 100th senior league appearance in a Round 5 match against Waikato Bay of Plenty Magic. She was subsequently a prominent member of the 2020 and 2021 Mainland Tactix teams that finished as ANZ Premiership runners up and grand finalists. On 27 March 2023, she made her 50th appearance for Tactix in a Round 4 match against Magic. On 7 May 2023, she made her 150th senior league appearance in a Round 10 match against Northern Stars.

=== Queensland Firebirds ===
At the end of the ANZ Premiership Season 2025 Selby-Rickit announced she would be joining the Queensland Firebirds for the 2026 SSN Season.

=== New Zealand ===
In August 2016, Selby-Rickit was called up for the senior New Zealand team. On 27 August 2016, Selby-Rickit made her senior debut against England during the 2016 Netball Quad Series. She made her international debut at goal attack, coming on at the start of the fourth quarter, to replace Ameliaranne Wells. With her older sister, Te Huinga Reo Selby-Rickit, already an international, the Selby-Rickit sisters became only the second set of sisters, after Maxine Blomquist and Annette Heffernan, to play for New Zealand. Selby-Rickit was subsequently a member of the New Zealand teams that won the 2016 Fast5 Netball World Series, the 2017 Netball Quad Series, the 2019 Netball World Cup and the 2020 Netball Nations Cup. She also represented New Zealand at the 2018 and 2022 Commonwealth Games and the 2023 Netball World Cup.

Tournaments	Place	Goals (%)
2016 Netball Quad Series	2nd	2/3 (67%)
2016 Taini Jamison Trophy Series	1st	60/77 (78%)
2016 Constellation Cup	2nd	59/75 (79%)
2016 Fast5 Netball World Series	1st place, gold medalist(s)	
2017 Netball Quad Series (January/February)	2nd	31/34 (91%)
2017 Netball Quad Series (August/September)	1st	52/62 (84%)
2017 Taini Jamison Trophy Series	1st	32/39 (82%)
2017 Constellation Cup	2nd	51/62 (82%)
2018 Netball Quad Series (January)	3rd	48/55 (87%)
2018 Taini Jamison Trophy Series	2nd	82/95 (86%)
2018 Commonwealth Games	4th	104/123 (85%)
2018 Netball Quad Series (September)	3rd	48/55 (87%)
2018 Constellation Cup	2nd	47/67 (70%)
2019 Netball World Cup	1st place, gold medalist(s)	95/101 (94%)
2019 Constellation Cup	2nd	^{(Note 1)}
2020 Netball Nations Cup	1st place, gold medalist(s)	35/41 (85%)
2021 Taini Jamison Trophy Series	2nd	31/38 (82%)
2022 Commonwealth Games	3rd place, bronze medalist(s)	102/115 (89%)
2022 Taini Jamison Trophy Series	1st	11/11 (100%)
2022 Constellation Cup	2nd	7/7 (100%)
2023 Netball Quad Series	2nd	4/4 (100%)
2023 Netball World Cup	4th	107/119 (90%)

Notes

- ^1 Member of the squad. However she did not play in the series.

== Statistics ==
=== Grand finals ===
	Grand finals	Team	Place	Opponent	Goals (%)
1	2017	Southern Steel	Winners	Central Pulse	13/19 (68%)
2	2018	Southern Steel	Winners	Central Pulse	14/18 (78%)
3	2020	Mainland Tactix	Runners up	Central Pulse	12/13 (92%)
4	2021	Mainland Tactix	Runners up	Northern Mystics	21/39 (54%)

=== Individual ===
Season	Team	G/A	GA	RB	CPR	FD	IC	DF	PN	TO	MP
2011	Steel	16/26 (62%)									2
2012	Steel	?/?									5?
2013	Steel	8/13 (62%)									3
2014	Steel	45/56 (80%)									5
2015	Steel	175/220 (80%) ^{3}									14
2016	Steel	172/225 (76%)									14
2017	Steel	230/304 (76%)	?	16	272	?	3	14	33	47	14
2018	Steel	397/509 (78%)	?	50	273	?	2	17	57	95	17
2019	Steel	290/381 (76%)	184	27	362	248	5	15	54	88	16
2020	Tactix	200/252 (79%)	205	7	194	291	4	13	37	73	15
2021	Tactix	207/290 (71%)	226	21	276	316	0	15	47	94	15
2022	Tactix	258/315 (82%)	228	19	307	302	1	7	13	100	15
2023	Tactix	286/337 (85%)	?	13	290	258	4	13	44	90	15
Career											

Notes

- ^2 Between 2011 and 2016, Selby-Rickit made 46 ANZ Championship appearances with Southern Steel.
- ^3 Includes goals in the regular season only.

== Honours ==
New Zealand

- Netball World Cup
  - Winners: 2019
- Netball Quad Series
  - Winners: 2017 (August/September)
- Netball Nations Cup
  - Winners: 2020
- Taini Jamison Trophy
  - Winners: 2016, 2017, 2022
- Fast5 Netball World Series
  - Winners: 2016

Southern Steel

- ANZ Premiership
  - Winners: 2017, 2018
- ANZ Championship
  - Minor premiers: 2016
- Netball New Zealand Super Club
  - Winners: 2017

Mainland Tactix

- ANZ Premiership
  - Runners Up: 2020, 2021
