= Cathrine Tuivaiti =

Samoa, Tonga and New Zealand netball international

Personal information
- Born: 25 October 1986 (age 40) Auckland, New Zealand
- Height: 1.89 m (6 ft 2 in)
- Spouse: Jimmy Tuivaiti
- Relative: Tevita Leo-Latu (cousin)
- School: Massey High School
- University: Auckland University of Technology

Netball career
- Playing positions: GS, GA
Years	Club team	Apps
2005–2007	Northern Force	21
2008–2016	Northern Mystics	122
2017	Central Pulse	17
2018	Southern Force	4
2018	Adelaide Thunderbirds	5
2018–2019	Strathclyde Sirens	
2022	Severn Stars	13
2022–2023	Wasps Netball	0
2023–	Gold Coast Titans	
Years	National team	Caps
2005–2007	Samoa	30
2009	World 7	3
2011–2014	New Zealand	24
2023–	Tonga	
Coaching career
- Years: Team
- 2022–2023: Wasps Netball
Medal record
Representing New Zealand
Fast5 Netball World Series
Gold medal – first place	2013 Auckland	Team
Silver medal – second place	2011 Liverpool	Team
Commonwealth Games
Silver medal – second place	2014 Glasgow	Team

Cathrine Tuivaiti (née Latu; born 25 October 1986) is a netball international who has played for Samoa, New Zealand and Tonga. She represented Samoa at the 2006 Commonwealth Games and the 2007 World Netball Championships, New Zealand at the 2014 Commonwealth Games and Tonga at the 2023 Netball World Cup. During the National Bank Cup era, she played for Northern Force. During the ANZ Championship era, she played for Northern Mystics. She subsequently played for Central Pulse, Adelaide Thunderbirds, Strathclyde Sirens and Severn Stars. In 2022, she was included on a list of the 25 best players to feature in netball leagues in New Zealand since 1998.

== Early life, family and education ==
Latu is the daughter of Mary-Anne Huxtable and David Latu. Her mother is Pālagi with some Ngāpuhi/Māori ancestry. Her father is mostly Tongan with some Samoan ancestry. His family is originally from Nukuʻalofa. Cathrine is the sixth of ten children. She has five sisters and four brothers. She was born in Auckland. However the family subsequently moved to Kawakawa in the Bay of Islands area. Cathrine attended Kawakawa Primary School and Bay of Islands College. Between 2001 and 2004, Latu attended Massey High School on a scholarship. While attending Massey High, she met and started dating, Jimmy Tuivaiti. She subsequently attended Auckland University of Technology. In 2016 Latu and Tuivaiti married. Together they have two children. Tuivaiti is an Italy rugby union international. Her cousin, Tevita Leo-Latu played rugby league for New Zealand and Tonga.

== Playing career ==
=== Club career ===
==== Northern Force ====
Between 2005 and 2007, Latu made 21 senior appearances for Northern Force in the National Bank Cup league. She was a member of the Force team that played in the 2007 grand final, which they lost to Southern Sting.

==== Northern Mystics ====
Between 2008 and 2016, Latu made 122 senior appearances for Northern Mystics in the ANZ Championship. She was a member of the inaugural Mystics team. Ahead of the 2009 season, Latu was given special dispensation by the league to play for Mystics due to complications resulting from her decision to switch her international allegiances from Samoa to New Zealand. Latu was a member of the 2011 Northern Mystics team that finished as grand finalists in the ANZ Championship. During the same season, Latu made her 50th ANZ Championship/Mystics appearance in a Round 11 match against Canterbury Tactix. Throughout her time with Mystics, Latu was known for her shooting accuracy. She was the most accurate shooter in the 2012 ANZ Championship, averaging 97.5%. On 13 April 2015, during a Round 7 match against Central Pulse, Latu made her 100th ANZ Championship/Mystics appearance. She subsequently helped Mystics finish as 2015 New Zealand Conference minor premiers. She also finished the 2015 ANZ Championship as the league's most-accurate goal shooter, averaging 93.8%. When Latu left Mystics at the end of the 2015 season, she was the last remaining original member of the franchise.

==== Central Pulse ====
Ahead of the 2017 season, Tuivaiti signed for Central Pulse. She was subsequently a prominent member of the 2017 Central Pulse team that finished as grand finalists in the ANZ Premiership and as semi-finalists in the Netball New Zealand Super Club tournament. Tuivaiti made her 150th senior league appearance in a Round 6 match against Southern Steel. She was the 2017 ANZ Premiership's most accurate shooter, scoring 483 from 509 and finishing the season with a 95% accuracy rate.

==== Adelaide Thunderbirds ====
Ahead of the 2018 Suncorp Super Netball season, Tuivaiti signed for Adelaide Thunderbirds. However in her final match for Central Pulse, during the Super Club tournament, she suffered an ACL injury. In June 2018, after eleven months of rehabilitation, Tuivaiti played four games for Southern Force, the Thunderbirds reserve team, in the Australian Netball League. On 8 July, she eventually made her senior debut for Thunderbirds in a Round 10 match against Collingwood Magpies. In total she made five appearances for Thunderbirds.

==== Netball Superleague ====
Ahead of the 2019 Netball Superleague season, Tuivaiti signed for Strathclyde Sirens. She was effectively a training partner for the Scotland national netball team as they prepared for the 2019 Netball World Cup. However in March 2019, it was announced that she was pregnant with her first child and would be unable to complete the season. During the 2021 season, Tuivaiti was a member of Severn Stars coaching team. During the 2022 season, she made 13 playing appearances for Stars. Ahead of the 2023 season, Tuivaiti was appointed head coach of Wasps Netball. She also agreed terms to join the playing squad. However, Wasps parent company subsequently went into administration, leaving the coaches and players, including Tuivaiti, without a job.

==== Gold Coast Titans ====
In 2023, after answering a call from their head coach, her former Mystics team mate Temepara Bailey, Tuivaiti played for Gold Coast Titans in the Sapphire Series.

=== International career ===
==== Samoa ====
Between 2005 and 2007, Latu made 30 senior appearances for Samoa. She represented Samoa at the 2006 Commonwealth Games and the 2007 World Netball Championships.

==== World 7 ====
In August 2009, Latu played for a World 7 team, coached by Julie Fitzgerald, that played New Zealand in the 2009 Taini Jamison Trophy Series. Latu played in the first and third tests, helping the World 7 win the series 2–1. She was player of the match for the first test. On 3 September 2009, she played for a World 7 team, coached by Robyn Broughton, that played Australia in a one-off test. Latu partnered Donna Wilkins in the shooting circle and helped the World 7 win 52–43.

==== New Zealand ====
In March 2011 it was reported that Netball New Zealand were appealing to the Court of Arbitration for Sport to declare Latu eligible to represent New Zealand at the 2011 World Netball Championships. International Federation of Netball Associations rules stated a player could not represent two different countries at successive World Netball Championships. Netball New Zealand cited the case of Vilimaina Davu, who had represented New Zealand in 2003 and Fiji in 2007. In April 2011, Latu was named in the New Zealand squad for the 2011 World Netball Championships. However, CAS ruled that Netball New Zealand had made their appeal too late, saying they should have presented it in 2009.

On 3 October 2011, Latu eventually made her senior debut for New Zealand against England during the 2011 Taini Jamison Trophy Series. She came on for the second half, scoring 17 from 17. In the same match, Kayla Cullen and Sulu Tone-Fitzpatrick also made their senior New Zealand debuts. She was a member of the New Zealand teams that won the 2012 Constellation Cup and the 2013 Fast5 Netball World Series. She was also a member of the New Zealand team that were silver medallists at the 2014 Commonwealth Games. However, Latu subsequently fell out of favour and she was dropped for the 2015 Netball World Cup and the 2015 Constellation Cup. In April 2022, she was one of 25 New Zealand internationals included on a list of the best players to feature in netball leagues in New Zealand since 1998.

==== Tonga ====
In June 2023, Tuivaiti was selected to play for the Tonga for the 2023 Netball World Cup.

Tournaments	Place	Goals (%)	Team
2006 Commonwealth Games	5th	136/154 (88%)	Samoa
2007 World Netball Championships	8th		Samoa
2009 Taini Jamison Trophy Series	1st	50/58 (86%)	World 7
2011 Taini Jamison Trophy Series	1st	30/30 (100%)	New Zealand
2011 Constellation Cup	2nd	27/31 (87%)	New Zealand
2011 World Netball Series	2nd place, silver medalist(s)		New Zealand
2012 Constellation Cup	1st	13/13 (100%)	New Zealand
2012 Netball Quad Series	2nd		New Zealand
2013 Constellation Cup	2nd	55	New Zealand
2013 Taini Jamison Trophy Series	1st	65/68 (96%)	New Zealand
2013 Fast5 Netball World Series	1st place, gold medalist(s)		New Zealand
2014 Commonwealth Games	2nd place, silver medalist(s)	99/103 (96%)	New Zealand
2014 Constellation Cup	2nd	65/67 (97%)	New Zealand
2014 Taini Jamison Trophy Series	1st	26/28 (93%)	New Zealand
2023 Netball World Cup	9th	78/79 (99%)	Tonga

== Personal life ==
Tuivaiti has spoken openly about her weight issues, including having to deal with cyberbullying.

== Honours ==
New Zealand

- Constellation Cup
  - Winners: 2012
- Fast5 Netball World Series
  - Winners: 2013
  - Runners Up: 2011
- Taini Jamison Trophy
  - Winners: 2011, 2013, 2014
- Commonwealth Games
  - Runners Up: 2014
- Netball Quad Series
  - Runners Up: 2012

Central Pulse

- ANZ Premiership
  - Runners Up: 2017

Northern Mystics

- ANZ Championship
  - Runners Up: 2011
- ANZ Championship – New Zealand Conference
  - Minor premiers: 2015

Northern Force

- National Bank Cup
  - Runners Up: 2007

World 7

- Taini Jamison Trophy
  - Winners: 2009
