= Temalisi Fakahokotau =

New Zealand netball player

Personal information
- Born: 9 September 1994 (age 31) New Zealand
- Height: 1.82 m (6 ft 0 in)
- School: Westlake Girls High School

Netball career
- Playing positions: GD, WD, GK
Years	Club team	Apps
2014–16	Northern Mystics	
2017–18, 20	Mainland Tactix	
2021	Waikato BOP Magic	
2022–	Central Pulse	
Years	National team	Caps
2014–18	New Zealand	22

Temalisi Fakahokotau (born 9 September 1994) is a former New Zealand netball player of Tongan descent. She first played for the national team in 2014.

== Early life ==
Fakahokotau was born in New Zealand of Tongan parents on 9 September 1994. She is one of nine siblings, and has seven brothers and one sister. She attended Westlake Girls High School in Auckland, where she was Sportswoman of the Year in 2012. She was named in the New Zealand Secondary Schools Squad and represented the Northern Zone in Under-23 competition. In 2014 she joined the Northern Mystics team to compete in the ANZ Premiership. She made her New Zealand debut in the 2014 Constellation Cup against Australia.

== Professional career ==
In 2017 she joined the Mainland Tactix, a team based in Christchurch on New Zealand's South Island. In 2018 she was the Team Player of the Year for the Tactix and led the ANZ Premiership in all defensive statistics, but in September of that year she suffered an anterior cruciate ligament injury, which meant that she was unable to play for New Zealand in the 2019 World Cup. She joined Waikato Bay of Plenty Magic in 2020, wishing to return to the north to be near her family. At the end of 2021 she signed for the Central Pulse team, but not long after stepped down from the Pulse for the 2022 season, highlighting family priorities. Fakahokotau made a surprise move by joining the Saracens Mavericks for the remainder of the United Kingdom's 2022 Netball Superleague season.
