= Jess Maclennan =

New Zealand netball player

Jessica Maclennan
Personal information
- Full name: Née: Moulds
- Born: 8 November 1989 (age 37) Helensville, New Zealand
- Height: 1.88 m (6 ft 2 in)
- Spouse: Andrew Maclennan (m. 2017)

Netball career
- Playing positions: GK, GD
Years	Club team	Apps
2014–present	Mainland Tactix	
Years	National team	Caps
2010	FastNet Ferns	
Medal record
Representing New Zealand
World Netball Series
Gold medal – first place	2010 Liverpool	Fastnet
- Updated on 9 May 2018

Jessica Maclennan (née Moulds; born 8 November 1989 in Helensville, New Zealand) is a New Zealand netball player, who currently plays for the Mainland Tactix in the ANZ Premiership. Formerly a shooter, she can play in the GK and GD positions. Maclennan formally played for the Northern Mystics, before joining the Tactix in 2014.

Maclennan played for the Fastnet Ferns in the 2010 World Netball Series, where she won a gold medal. She was also a part of the 2009 New Zealand U21 team, where she won a silver medal at the World Youth Championships.

In 2012, Maclennan made the newspapers all over New Zealand, when she was a part of the 'Harrison Hoist' where she lifted team-mate Anna Harrison to deflect a shot above the rim.

She is the older sister of New Zealand rugby union player Matt Moulds, who plays for the Blues in Super Rugby.

Moulds has a master's degree from the University of Otago, completed in 2013, with a thesis on the dietary habits of athletes with spinal-cord injuries.
