= Mainland Tactix =

New Zealand netball team

- Founded: 2008
- Based in: Christchurch
- Regions: Canterbury; West Coast; Nelson Region; Marlborough Region
- Home venue: Wolfbrook Arena
- Head coach: Donna Wilkins
- Captain: Erikana Pedersen
- Vice-captain: Karin Burger
- League: ANZ Premiership
- Website: tactixnetball.co.nz
Uniform
Uniform

Mainland Tactix are a New Zealand netball team based in Christchurch, New Zealand. Between 1998 and 2007, as Canterbury Flames, they played in the Coca-Cola Cup/National Bank Cup league. Between 2008 and 2016, they played in the ANZ Championship. Between 2008 and 2012 they were known as Canterbury Tactix. However, after Netball Mainland was established in October 2012, the team subsequently adopted their current name. Netball Mainland is the governing body that represents the South Island regions of Canterbury, West Coast, Nelson and Marlborough. Since 2017, Tactix have represented Netball Mainland in the ANZ Premiership. During the ANZ Championship era, Tactix won just 20 of their 114 games and never featured in a finals series. However, during the ANZ Premiership era they emerged as challengers. They were grand finalists in both 2020 and 2021. In 2025, the Tactix won their first Premiership.

== History ==
=== Canterbury Flames ===
Between 1997 and 2007, Canterbury Flames, competed in the Coca-Cola Cup/National Bank Cup league. In 2008, when the National Bank Cup was replaced by the ANZ Championship, Canterbury Flames were rebranded as Canterbury Tactix.

=== ANZ Championship ===
Between 2008 and 2016, Tactix played in the ANZ Championship. Helen Mahon-Stroud became the first Tactix head coach and Julie Seymour became their first captain. Netball Mainland was established in October 2012 and Canterbury Tactix subsequently became Mainland Tactix. During their nine seasons in the ANZ Championship, Tactix won just 20 of their 114 games, never winning more than five games in a season and never featuring in a finals series.

Regular season statistics

Season	Position	Won	Drawn	Lost
2008	8th	5	0	8
2009	6th	5	0	8
2010	10th	1	0	12
2011	10th	1	0	12
2012	10th	2	0	11
2013	9th	2	0	11
2014	10th	1	0	12
2015	10th	1	0	12
2016	8th	2	1	10

=== ANZ Premiership ===
Since 2017, Tactix have played in the ANZ Premiership. They were runners up in the 2018 Netball New Zealand Super Club tournament. In 2020 and 2021, with a team coached by Marianna Delaney-Hoshek and captained by Jane Watson, Tactix played in two successive grand finals but were defeated both times by the Central Pulse and the Northern Mystics. In 2024, the Tactix finished second after the regular season, but lost in the elimination final to eventual champions Northern Mystics. The Tactix won their first ANZ Premiership after defeating the Northern Mystics 58–46 in the 2025 Grand Final in Auckland.

Regular season statistics

Season	Position	Won	Drawn	Lost
2017	6th	2	0	13
2018	3rd	7	0	8
2019	5th	5	0	10
2020	2nd	9	2	4
2021	3rd	9	0	6
2022	6th	5	0	10
2023	4th	9	0	6
2024	2nd	11	0	4
2025	2nd	7	0	3

Premiership
Runners Up

== Grand finals ==
ANZ Premiership

Season	Winners	Score	Runners up	Venue
2020	Central Pulse	43–31	Mainland Tactix	Stadium Southland
2021	Northern Mystics	61–59	Mainland Tactix	Spark Arena
2025	Mainland Tactix	58–46	Northern Mystics	The Trusts Arena

Netball New Zealand Super Club

Season	Winners	Score	Runners up	Venue
2018	Central Pulse	61–56	Mainland Tactix	Trafalgar Centre

== Home venues ==
	Years	City
Wolfbrook Arena	2008–	Christchurch
Trafalgar Centre	2012–	Nelson
Cowles Stadium	2022–	Christchurch
Mainpower Stadium	2023–	Rangiora

== Notable players ==
=== 2026 squad ===
2026 Mainland Tactix roster
Players
Coaching staff

Nat.	Name	Position(s)	DoB	Height
(Australia)	Charlie Bell	GS	21 May 2001 (age 25)	1.97 m (6 ft 6 in)
(New Zealand)	Fa'amu Ioane	WD,C	11 March 1996 (age 30)	1.72 m (5 ft 8 in)
(Samoa)	Amorangi Malesala	GA,GS	19 June 1998 (age 28)	1.79 m (5 ft 10 in)
(New Zealand)	Holly Mather	C, WD	6 April 2001 (age 25)	–
(New Zealand)	Erikana Pedersen (c)	WA, C, WD	28 July 1994 (age 32)	1.73 m (5 ft 8 in)
(New Zealand)	Parris Petera	WA, C	9 December 2002 (age 23)	1.74 m (5 ft 9 in)
(New Zealand)	Laura Balmer	GK, GD	17 March 2004 (age 22)	1.90 m (6 ft 3 in)
(New Zealand)	Hannah Glen	GS,GA	12 November 2000 (age 26)	1.89 m (6 ft 2 in)
(Australia)	Ash Barnett	GK,GD	16 November 2002 (age 24)	1.88 m (6 ft 2 in)
(New Zealand)	Josie Seymour	WD,GD		1.80 m (5 ft 11 in)

Head coach

- Donna Wilkins

Assistant coach

- Te Huinga Reo Selby-Rickit

Manager: Carolyn Corbett
Physiotherapist: Alana Malcolm
Strength and conditioning: Mark Drury

Notes

- (c) – Captain
- (cc) – Co-captain
- (vc) – Vice-captain
- – Injury / maternity leave
- (TRP) – Temporary Replacement Player
Player profiles: Team website
Last updated: 19 February 2026

=== Internationals ===
New Zealand

- Maree Bowden
- Jodi Brown
- Karin Burger
- Aliyah Dunn
- Temalisi Fakahokotau
- Anna Galvan
- Ellen Halpenny
- Bailey Mes
- Angela Mitchell
- Erikana Pedersen
- Kimiora Poi
- Te Paea Selby-Rickit
- Julie Seymour
- Anna Thompson
- Malia Vaka
- Jane Watson
- Donna Wilkins
- Larrissa Willcox

New Zealand Fast5

- Charlotte Kight
- Jessica Moulds

Australia

- Kate Beveridge
- Demelza Fellowes
- Chelsea Pitman

England

- Jade Clarke
- Kadeen Corbin
- Rachel Dunn
- Stacey Francis
- Joanne Harten
- Sonia Mkoloma
- Chelsea Pitman
- Laura Malcolm

Fiji

- Kelera Nawai

Hong Kong

- Victoria Smith

Jamaica

- Kasey Evering

Malawi

- Mwai Kumwenda

Samoa

- Julianna Naoupu

Tonga

- Vika Koloto

=== Captains ===
	Years
Julie Seymour	2008–2009
Maree Bowden	2010–2012
Donna Wilkins	2011
Anna Thompson	2013–2016
Jess Moulds	2017–2018
Jane Watson	2018–2020
Kimiora Poi	2021–2024
Erikana Pedersen	2025–Present

=== Award winners ===
==== ANZ Championship awards ====
ANZ Championship Best New Talent

Season	Player
2014	Mwai Kumwenda

==== New Zealand Netball Awards ====
ANZ Premiership Player of the Year

Season	Winner
2020	Jane Watson
2021	Karin Burger

== Coaches ==
=== Head coaches ===
Coach	Years
Helen Mahon-Stroud	2007–2011
Leigh Gibbs	2012–2014
Sue Hawkins	2014–2017
Marianne Delaney-Hoshek	2017–2024
Donna Wilkins	2025–Present

=== Assistant coaches ===
Coach	Years
Julie Seymour	2008–2014
Marianne Delaney-Hoshek	2015–2017
Julie Seymour	2018–2021
Tania Hoffman	2022–2023
Te Huinga Reo Selby-Rickit	2024–Present

== Main sponsors ==
Sponsors	Seasons
Skope	2008
Mercury Energy	2009–2011
Easiyo	2012–2014
Silvermoon	2017–2018
The Good Oil	2019–2021
Trident Homes	2022–2024

== Reserve team ==
Since 2016, Netball Mainland have entered a team in the National Netball League. They are effectively the reserve team of the Mainland Tactix. In 2025, the team won their first National Netball League title after defeating the Central Manawa 48–44 in the final.

== Honours ==
- ANZ Premiership
  - Winners: 2025
  - Runners Up: 2020, 2021
- Netball New Zealand Super Club
  - Runners Up: 2018
