= Central Pulse =

New Zealand netball team

- Founded: 2007
- Based in: Wellington
- Regions: Hawke's Bay Region; Manawatū-Whanganui; Taranaki; Wellington Region
- Home venue: TSB Bank Arena
- Head coach: Anna Andrews-Tasola
- Captain: Kelly Jackson
- Premierships: 3 (2019, 2020, 2022)
- League: ANZ Premiership
- Website: pulse.org.nz
Uniform

Central Pulse are a New Zealand netball team based in Wellington. Between 2008 and 2016, they played in the ANZ Championship. Since 2017 they have represented Netball Central in the ANZ Premiership. Netball Central is the governing body that represents the Hawke's Bay, Manawatū-Whanganui, Taranaki and Wellington Regions. Pulse were 2019, 2020 and 2022 ANZ Premiership winners. They also won the 2018 Netball New Zealand Super Club tournament.

== History ==
=== Formation ===
Central Pulse were formed in 2007. The new team was effectively a merger of two former National Bank Cup teams, Capital Shakers and Western Flyers. Pulse subsequently became founder members of the ANZ Championship. The former Australia head coach, Jill McIntosh was appointed director of coaching, Singapore head coach, Kate Carpenter, was appointed head coach and England international, Sonia Mkoloma, became the team's first player.

=== ANZ Championship ===
Between 2008 and 2016, Central Pulse played in the ANZ Championship. On 5 April 2008, Pulse hosted the very first ANZ Championship match at the TSB Bank Arena, losing 33–50 to Melbourne Vixens. During the early ANZ Championship era, Pulse struggled to establish themselves both on and off the court. In 2008, Pulse suffered a winless season. The only point they gained was by default. In their Round 10 match against West Coast Fever, a leaky roof at Challenge Stadium saw the match called off and declared a draw. Each team received one point. Carpenter was subsequently replaced as head coach by Yvette McCausland-Durie.

Meanwhile, off the court, Pulse lost their main sponsor after just one season and needed financial bailouts from both Netball New Zealand and the league itself. Ahead of the 2009 season, Pulse found themselves fined for missing the deadline to announce their squad. There was also speculation that Netball New Zealand wanted to use the franchise as a development team for New Zealand under-21 players. After 24 games, Pulse eventually won their first ever match when they defeated New South Wales Swifts 53–52 in a 2009 Round 13 match at the Te Rauparaha Arena.

Pulse enjoyed their best season during the ANZ Championship era in 2013, when with a team coached by Robyn Broughton, captained by Katrina Grant and featuring Joline Henry, Caitlin Thwaites and Donna Wilkins, they won eight matches and finished fifth.

Regular season statistics

Season	Position	Won	Drawn	Lost
2008	10th	0	1	12
2009	10th	1	0	12
2010	9th	1	0	12
2011	8th	3	0	10
2012	7th	5	0	8
2013	5th	8	0	5
2014	6th	7	0	6
2015	9th	3	2	8
2016	9th	2	1	10

=== ANZ Premiership ===
Since 2017, Pulse have played in the ANZ Premiership. During the early ANZ Premiership era, they emerged as one of the leagues strongest teams. Between 2017 and 2020, with a team coached by Yvette McCausland-Durie, captained by Katrina Grant and featuring, among others, Karin Burger, Ameliaranne Ekenasio and Claire Kersten, Pulse played in four successive grand finals. Between 2018 and 2020 they won three successive minor premierships. Pulse were the 2019 and 2020 overall champions. They also won the 2018 Netball New Zealand Super Club tournament.

Regular season statistics

Season	Position	Won	Drawn	Lost
2017	2nd	9	6	2
2018	1st	12	3	3
2019	1st	13	2	0
2020	1st	11	2	1
2021	5th	4	0	11
2022	1st	10	0	5
2023	2nd	10	0	5
2024	1st	12	0	3
2025	3rd	6	0	4

Premierships
Runners Up

== Grand finals ==
ANZ Premiership

Season	Winners	Score	Runners up	Venue
2017	Southern Steel	69–53	Central Pulse	Stadium Southland
2018	Southern Steel	54–53	Central Pulse	Fly Palmy Arena
2019	Central Pulse	52–48	Northern Stars	Te Rauparaha Arena
2020	Central Pulse	43–31	Mainland Tactix	Stadium Southland
2022	Central Pulse	56–37	Northern Stars	TSB Bank Arena
2024	Northern Mystics	53-54	Central Pulse	TSB Bank Arena

Netball New Zealand Super Club

Season	Winners	Score	Runners up	Venue
2018	Central Pulse	61–56	Mainland Tactix	Trafalgar Centre

== Home venues ==
Pulse's main venue is Wellington's TSB Bank Arena. They have also regularly played home matches at Porirua's Te Rauparaha Arena and at the Fly Palmy Arena in Palmerston North.

	Years
TSB Arena	2008–
Te Rauparaha Arena	2009–
Fly Palmy Arena	2008–
Pettigrew Green Arena	2008–2014

== Notable players ==
=== 2026 squad ===
2026 Central Pulse roster
Players
Coaching staff

Nat.	Name	Position(s)	DoB	Height
(New Zealand)	Ameliaranne Ekenasio	GS, GA	11 January 1991 (age 35)	1.86 m (6 ft 1 in)
(New Zealand)	Parris Mason	GD,GK,WD	13 December 2002 (age 23)	1.84 m (6 ft 0 in)
(New Zealand)	Khiarna Williams	GA,GS	7 December 2002 (age 23)	1.83 m (6 ft 0 in)
(Samoa)	Ainsleyana Puleiata	C, WD, WA	23 June 2000 (age 26)	1.70 m (5 ft 7 in)
(New Zealand)	Emma Thompson	C,WA	9 November 1996 (age 30)	–
(South Africa)	Ine-Marí Venter	GS,GA	21 April 1995 (age 31)	1.92 m (6 ft 4 in)
(Australia)	Lili Gorman-Brown	WA,C	24 June 1999 (age 27)	1.73 m (5 ft 8 in)
(Australia)	Holly Comyns	GK,GD		1.90 m (6 ft 3 in)
(New Zealand)	Madi Thomas	GK,GD		–
(New Zealand)	Erana Ngarimu	WD,C		–

Head coach

- Anna Andrews-Tasola

Manager: Jill Clapcott
Physiotherapist: Ari Carroll
Specialist Coach:
Waimarama Taumaunu

Notes

- (c) – Captain
- (cc) – Co-captain
- (vc) – Vice-captain
- – Injury / maternity leave
- (TRP) – Temporary Replacement Player
Player profiles: Team website
Last updated: 19 February 2026

=== Internationals ===
New Zealand

- Karin Burger
- Aliyah Dunn
- Ameliaranne Ekenasio
- Temalisi Fakahokotau
- Maddy Gordon
- Paula Griffin
- Joline Henry
- Kelly Jackson
- Phoenix Karaka
- Claire Kersten
- Cathrine Latu
- Camilla Lees
- Liana Leota
- Amorangi Malesala
- Parris Mason
- Tiana Metuarau
- Erikana Pedersen
- Katrina Rore
- Te Huinga Reo Selby-Rickit
- Whitney Souness
- Sulu Tone-Fitzpatrick
- Irene van Dyk
- Amelia Walmsley
- Donna Wilkins
- Maia Wilson

New Zealand Fast5

- Rachel Rasmussen
- Kristiana Manu'a

Australia

- Jane Altschwager
- Kristiana Manu'a
- Chelsea Pitman
- Caitlin Thwaites
- Gabi Simpson

England

- Ama Agbeze
- Sara Bayman
- Sonia Mkoloma
- Chelsea Pitman

Fiji

- Susan Tagicakibau
- Kelera Nawai

Hong Kong

- Victoria Smith

Jamaica

- Althea Byfield

Malawi

- Joyce Mvula

Samoa

- Cathrine Latu
- Ainsleyana Puleiata
- Rachel Rasmussen
- Frances Solia
- Saviour Tui

South Africa

- Irene van Dyk

=== Captains ===
	Years
Frances Solia	2008
Cushla Lichtwark	2009
Jane Altschwager	2010
Katrina Rore	2011–2021
Claire Kersten	2021
Tiana Metuarau	2021–
Kelly Jury	2021–

=== Award winners ===
==== ANZ Championship awards ====
ANZ Championship MVP

Season	Player
2008	Sonia Mkoloma ^{(Note 1)}

Notes

- ^1 Romelda Aiken and Sonia Mkoloma shared the 2008 award.

==== New Zealand Netball Awards ====
ANZ Premiership Player of the Year

Season	Winner
2018	Katrina Rore

== Coaches ==
=== Head coaches ===
Coach	Years
Kate Carpenter	2008
Yvette McCausland-Durie	2009–2011
Robyn Broughton	2012–2015
Tanya Dearns	2016
Yvette McCausland-Durie	2017–2020
Gail Parata	2020–2021
Yvette McCausland-Durie	2021–2023
Anna Andrews-Tasola	2023–

=== Assistant coaches ===
Coach	Years
Gail Parata	2010–2011
Marianne Delaney-Hoshek	2012–2014
Sandra Edge	2017–2019
Pelesa Semu	2020–2021
Anna Andrews-Tasola	2022–2023

== Main sponsors ==
Sponsors	Seasons
Suzuki	2008
Haier	2010–2014
Mojo Coffee	2015–2016
Te Wānanga o Raukawa	2017–

== Reserve team ==
Since 2016, Netball Central have also entered a team in the National Netball League. They are effectively the reserve team of Central Pulse. Between 2016 and 2018 they played as Central Zone. Since 2019, they have played as Central Manawa. Between 2017 and 2019, Central Zone/Central Manawa won three successive NNL titles. In 2022, Central Manawa won a fourth title.

== Honours ==
- ANZ Premiership
  - Winners: 2019, 2020, 2022
  - Runners Up: 2017
  - Minor premiers: 2018, 2019, 2020, 2022
- Netball New Zealand Super Club
  - Winners: 2018
