= Anna Thompson (netball) =

New Zealand netball player

Anna Kennedy
Personal information
- Born: 18 June 1986 (age 40) Christchurch, New Zealand
- Height: 1.76 m (5 ft 9 in)
- Relative: Luke Thompson (brother)

Netball career
- Playing positions: GA, GS, WA, C
Years	Club team	Apps
2008–present	Canterbury Tactix	39
Years	National team	Caps
2009, 2011	Silver Ferns	10
2009–present	FastNet Ferns	9
Medal record
Representing New Zealand
World Netball Series
Gold medal – first place	2009 Manchester	Fastnet
Gold medal – first place	2010 Liverpool	Fastnet
Silver medal – second place	2011 Liverpool	Fastnet
Gold medal – first place	2012 Auckland	Fast5
Gold medal – first place	2013 Auckland	Fast5
Netball World Championships
Silver medal – second place	2011 Singapore	Netball
- Updated on 23 January 2011

Anna Kennedy (born 18 June 1986 in Christchurch, New Zealand) is a New Zealand netball player. Kennedy plays in the ANZ Championship for the Canterbury Tactix. In 2009, she was named as a member of the Silver Ferns squad. She was included in the FastNet Ferns the following year, and was called back into the Silver Ferns for 2011 as cover for injured vice-captain Temepara George. She made the team for the 2011 Netball World Championships after Cathrine Latu was ruled ineligible.

She has been in and out of the Silver Ferns team, most recently she played in the first leg of the 2012 Netball Quad Series. She also made the team for the 2013 Fast5 Netball World Series, making her the only New Zealand player to contest all five World Netball Series tournaments.

She has re-signed with the Canterbury Tactix for the 2014 season, as their only remaining foundation player.

Her older brother Luke Thompson is a professional rugby union player who played 39 matches for Japan.
