= Bailey Mes =

New Zealand netball player

Personal information
- Born: 27 May 1989 (age 37) Auckland, Auckland Region, New Zealand
- Height: 1.87 m (6 ft 1 1/2 in)
- School: Onehunga High School

Netball career
- Playing positions: GS, GA, WA
Years	Club team	Apps
2015–16	Mainland Tactix	15
2010–2014, 2017-2021	Northern Mystics	
2022-	Waikato Bay of Plenty Magic	
- (Correct as of 29 August 2021)
2012–2023	New Zealand	76
Medal record
Netball
Representing New Zealand
World Netball Series
Gold medal – first place	2012 Auckland	Fast5
World Netball Championships
Gold medal – first place	2019 Liverpool	Netball
Silver medal – second place	2015 Sydney	Netball
Commonwealth Games
Bronze medal – third place	2022 Birmingham	Team

Bailey Mes (born 27 May 1989) is an Auckland born New Zealand netball player. She can play at goal shoot, goal attack, and wing attack. She currently plays for the Waikato/BOP Magic in the ANZ Premiership.

In 2012, she was selected into the Silver Ferns and made her debut in the Quad Series that year, against South Africa. She was a shock selection after playing only one quarter in the 2012 ANZ season, and was picked based on a strong trial, and her natural athleticism and fitness. She played in the 2012 Constellation Cup and 2012 Netball Quad Series, earning three caps.

She was also selected for the 2012 Fast5 Netball World Series, where she was used in the goal shoot position. She performed well in a number of matches and finished with one of the highest shooting percentages in the tournament. On 18 May 2023, Mes announced her retirement from international and domestic netball following the conclusion of the 2023 ANZ netball finals, citing injuries as the main cause of her retirement.
