= Malia Vaka =

New Zealand netball player

Personal information
- Born: 23 September 1994 (age 32) Auckland NZ
- Height: 1.83 m (6 ft 0 in)
- Spouse: Sam Vaka
- Children: 3

Netball career
- Playing positions: GS, GA
| Years | Club team | Apps |
| 2014-2016 | Waikato Bay of Plenty Magic | |
| 2013 | Northern Mystics | |
| 2017 | Northern Stars | |
| Years | National team | Caps |
| 2015 | New Zealand | 6 |
Medal record
Representing New Zealand
World Netball Championships
| Silver medal – second place | 2015 Sydney | Netball |

Malia Vaka (née Paseka; born 23 September 1994) is a New Zealand netball player who played junior netball in Australia. She was then a member of the New Zealand national netball team at the 2015 Netball World Cup. She announced her pregnancy on 11 June, and her withdrawal from the 2016 ANZ Championship.
