= ANZ Premiership =

Top level New Zealand netball league

- Current season, competition or edition: 2026 ANZ Premiership season
- Formerly: ANZ Championship
- Sport: Netball
- Founded: 2016
- First season: 2017
- Administrator: Netball New Zealand
- No. of teams: 6
- Country: New Zealand
- Most recent champion: Northern Mystics (4th title) (2026)
- Most titles: Northern Mystics (4 titles)
- Broadcasters: Sky Sport (New Zealand); TVNZ (from 2026)
- Sponsor: ANZ
- Level on pyramid: 1
- Related competitions: Super Club; National Netball League
- Website: anzpremiership.co.nz

The ANZ Premiership is the top level netball league featuring teams from New Zealand. In 2017 it replaced the ANZ Championship, which also included teams from Australia, as the top level netball league in New Zealand. It is organised by Netball New Zealand. Its main sponsor is ANZ. In 2017, Southern Steel were the inaugural ANZ Premiership winners. Northern Mystics is the league's most successful team, having won four premierships.

== History ==
=== Formation ===
In May 2016, Netball Australia and Netball New Zealand announced that the ANZ Championship would be discontinued after the 2016 season. In New Zealand it was replaced by the ANZ Premiership, while in Australia it was replaced by Suncorp Super Netball The founding members of ANZ Premiership included the five former New Zealand ANZ Championship teams – Central Pulse, Mainland Tactix, Northern Mystics, Southern Steel and Waikato Bay of Plenty Magic – plus a brand new franchise, Northern Stars.

=== Southern Steel ===
With a team coached by Reinga Bloxham, captained by Wendy Frew and featuring Gina Crampton, Jhaniele Fowler-Reid, Shannon Francois, and Jane Watson, Southern Steel finished the 2017 season as inaugural ANZ Premiership winners. After finishing the regular season unbeaten and as minor premiers, Steel defeated Central Pulse 69–53 in the grand final. This saw Steel complete a 16 match unbeaten season. Steel subsequently went on to retain their title and in the 2018 grand final they again defeated Pulse.

=== Central Pulse ===
During the early ANZ Premiership era, Central Pulse emerged as one of the leagues strongest teams. Between 2017 and 2020, with a team coached by Yvette McCausland-Durie, captained by Katrina Grant and featuring, among others, Karin Burger, Ameliaranne Ekenasio and Claire Kersten, Pulse played in four successive grand finals. Between 2018 and 2020 they won three successive minor premierships. Pulse were the 2019 and 2020 overall champions. In 2022, Pulse won their third title.

=== Northern Mystics ===
In 2021, with a team coached by Helene Wilson and captained by Sulu Fitzpatrick and featuring Ama Agbeze, Bailey Mes and Grace Nweke, Northern Mystics won their first ever premiership. After finishing the regular season as minor premiers, they defeated Mainland Tactix 61–59 in the grand final. In 2023, with a team coached by Tia Winikerei, captained by Sulu Fitzpatrick and featuring Phoenix Karaka, Grace Nweke, Michaela Sokolich-Beatson and Peta Toeava, Mystics won their second title. Mystics finished the regular season as minor premiers, finishing above Central Pulse and Northern Stars. Mystics defeated Stars 74–56 in the Grand final. In 2024 Mystics became the third team to win back-to-back premierships after beating Pulse 54–53 in the Grand final.

== Teams ==
Team	Colours	Main home venue	City/Suburb	Zone/Region
Central Pulse		TSB Bank Arena	Wellington	Central
Mainland Tactix		Christchurch Arena	Christchurch	Mainland (Canterbury)
Northern Mystics		The Trusts Arena	Auckland	Northern (Northland, Auckland)
Northern Stars		Pulman Arena	Takanini	East Auckland, South Auckland
Southern Steel		Stadium Southland	Invercargill	South (Southland, Otago)
Waikato Bay of Plenty Magic		Claudelands Arena	Hamilton	Waikato/Bay of Plenty

== Season Structure ==
From 2017 to 2024 teams played each other three times in the regular season. In 2025, the regular season was cut from three to two round robins.

Teams receive three points for a win, one point for a loss by five or fewer goals and zero points for a loss of greater than five goals. There are no tied matches - if scores are equal at the end of regulation time two three minute periods of extra time will be played. If the scores are still tied, play continues until one team reaches a two goal advantage.

In 2017 and 2018 teams received two points for a win. In 2020, there was a change of format due to the Covid-19 pandemic. Teams were awarded 4 points for a win, one point for a loss by five or fewer goals, zero points for a loss by greater than five goals and two points for a draw. No extra time matches were played in 2020.

At the conclusion of the regular season, the top three teams qualify for the finals. The top placed team directly qualifies and gains home advantage for the grand final where they play the winner of the elimination final between the second and third placed teams.

In 2020 the top two teams qualified for the grand final which was hosted behind closed doors in Invercargill. There was no elimination final, and a third and fourth playoff was scheduled to be played instead, however this match was cancelled.

In 2023, the grand final was predetermined to be hosted at Globox Arena in Hamilton. This ended up being a neutral venue as the two Auckland-based teams Northern Mystics and Northern Stars were the qualifiers.

== Grand finals ==
Season	Winners	Score	Runners up	Venue
2017	Southern Steel	69–53	Central Pulse	Stadium Southland
2018	Southern Steel	54–53	Central Pulse	Fly Palmy Arena
2019	Central Pulse	52–48	Northern Stars	Te Rauparaha Arena
2020	Central Pulse	43–31	Mainland Tactix	Stadium Southland
2021	Northern Mystics	61–59	Mainland Tactix	Spark Arena
2022	Central Pulse	56–37	Northern Stars	TSB Bank Arena
2023	Northern Mystics	74–56	Northern Stars	Globox Arena
2024	Northern Mystics	54–53	Central Pulse	TSB Bank Arena
2025	Mainland Tactix	58-46	Northern Mystics	The Trusts Arena

== Minor premierships ==
Season	Winners
2017	Southern Steel
2018	Central Pulse
2019	Central Pulse
2020	Central Pulse
2021	Northern Mystics
2022	Central Pulse
2023	Northern Mystics
2024	Central Pulse
2025	Northern Mystics
2026	Northern Mystics

== Premiership winning coaches ==
Season	Head coaches	Team
2017	Reinga Bloxham	Southern Steel
2018	Reinga Bloxham	Southern Steel
2019	Yvette McCausland-Durie	Central Pulse
2020	Yvette McCausland-Durie	Central Pulse
2021	Helene Wilson	Northern Mystics
2022	Yvette McCausland-Durie	Central Pulse
2023	Tia Winkikerei	Northern Mystics
2024	Tia Winkikerei	Northern Mystics
2025	Donna Wilkins	Mainland Tactix

== Premiership winning captains ==
Season	Captains	Team
2017	Wendy Frew	Southern Steel
2018	Wendy Frew	Southern Steel
2019	Katrina Grant	Central Pulse
2020	Katrina Rore	Central Pulse
2021	Sulu Fitzpatrick	Northern Mystics
2022	Tiana Metuarau; Kelly Jury	Central Pulse
2023	Sulu Fitzpatrick	Northern Mystics
2024	Michaela Sokolich-Beatson	Northern Mystics
2025	Erikana Pedersen	Mainland Tactix

== Top goal scorers ==
Season	Goal Shooter	Team	Goals (%)
2017	Jhaniele Fowler-Reid	Southern Steel	790/859 (92%)
2018	Maia Wilson	Northern Stars	566/633 (89%)
2019	Maia Wilson	Northern Stars	619/743 (83%)
2020	Grace Nweke	Northern Mystics	471/527 (89%)
2021	Grace Nweke	Northern Mystics	852/951 (90%)
2022	Aliyah Dunn	Central Pulse	618/664 (93%)
2023	Grace Nweke	Northern Mystics	825/894 (92%)
2024	Maia Wilson	Northern Stars	538/586 (92%)
2025	Amelia Walmsley	Central Pulse	491/511 (96%)

== Award winners ==
=== New Zealand Netball Awards ===
==== ANZ Premiership Player of the Year ====
Season	Player	Team
2017	Jane Watson	Southern Steel
2018	Katrina Rore	Central Pulse
2019	Gina Crampton	Southern Steel
2020	Jane Watson	Mainland Tactix
2021	Karin Burger	Mainland Tactix
2022	Kelly Jury	Central Pulse
2023	Maddy Gordon	Central Pulse
2024	Ameliaranne Ekenasio	Waikato Bay of Plenty Magic
2025	Elisapeta Toeava	Northern Mystics

==== ANZ Premiership Coach of the Year ====
Season	Coach	Team
2017		
2018		
2019	Yvette McCausland-Durie	Central Pulse
2020	Yvette McCausland-Durie	Central Pulse
2021	Helene Wilson	Northern Mystics
2022	Yvette McCausland-Durie	Central Pulse
2023	Tia Winikerei	Northern Mystics
2024	Tia Winikerei	Northern Mystics
2025	Donna Wilkins	Mainland Tactix

== Television coverage ==
Matches are broadcast live on Sky Sport (New Zealand). Starting from the 2024 season, one match a week is broadcast live on TVNZ. Following the conclusion of the 2025 season, Netball New Zealand announced that TVNZ would have exclusive rights to the 2026 season, showing all games on free-to-air television.
