= Claudelands Arena =

Sporting arena in New Zealand

- Globox Arena
- Interactive map of Claudelands Arena
- Former names: Claudelands Arena (2011–2021)
- Location: Hamilton, New Zealand
- Coordinates: 37°46′48″S 175°17′20″E
- Owner: H3, Hamilton City Council
- Capacity: Concerts: 6,000; Netball: 4,000; Banquet seating: 1,400

Construction
- Groundbreaking: 2007
- Opened: 18 June 2011
- Architect: Anthony Flannery (Chow:Hill)

Tenant
- Waikato Bay of Plenty Magic (ANZ Championship)

Website
- http://claudelands.co.nz

Claudelands Arena (also known by its sponsored name, the Globox Arena) is a multi-purpose indoor sports and entertainment arena located in Hamilton, New Zealand. Claudelands Arena is part of Claudelands Events Centre which contains a 6000-capacity arena and a conference and exhibition centre.

Claudelands Arena is a unique C-shaped auditorium, the only one of its kind in New Zealand and Australia, which is fully retractable and capable of holding live music and entertainment, international sporting events, large banquets, conferences and exhibitions.

The arena is one of the home venues for the Waikato Bay of Plenty Magic netball team in the ANZ Championship.

== History ==
Construction began on Claudelands Events Centre in 2007 and was completed in 2011 at a cost of $68.4 million ($NZD). The New Zealand Breakers hosted the first major event at the arena with a 2011 NBL pre-season game.

In August 2014, Bob Dylan performed at the arena during his Never Ending Tour 2014.

In September 2021, the venue was renamed Globox Arena in a five-year naming rights partnership with local business, Globox.

In December 2025, the New Zealand Breakers hosted an NBL Ignite Cup at Globox Arena as part of the 2025–26 NBL season.

== See also ==
- List of indoor arenas in New Zealand
