= 2019 Central Pulse season =

Central Pulse season

Central Pulse
- 2019 season
- Head coach: Yvette McCausland-Durie
- Asst. coach: Sandra Edge
- Manager: Joanne Holmes
- Captain: Katrina Rore
- Main venue: TSB Bank Arena

Season results
- Wins–losses: 14–2
- Regular season: 1st
- Finals placing: ANZ Premiership winners
- Team colours

Central Pulse seasons
- ← 2018 2020 →

The 2019 Central Pulse season saw the Central Pulse netball team compete in the 2019 ANZ Premiership. With a team coached by Yvette McCausland-Durie, captained by Katrina Rore and featuring Karin Burger, Aliyah Dunn, Ameliaranne Ekenasio and Sulu Fitzpatrick, Pulse finished the regular season as minor premiers. In the grand final, Pulse defeated Northern Stars 52–48, winning their first premiership.

== Players ==
=== Player movements ===
Gains and losses
▲ Gains	▼ Losses
Maddy Gordon (Central Zone); Elle Temu (Central Zone)	Mila Reuelu-Buchanan (Northern Stars); Rene Savai'inaea (Central Manawa)

=== 2019 roster ===
2019 Central Pulse roster
Players
Coaching staff

Nat.	Name	Position(s)	DoB	Height
(New Zealand)	Karin Burger	GD, WD, GK	12 April 1993 (aged 25)	1.84 m (6 ft 0 in)
(New Zealand)	Aliyah Dunn	GS	19 October 1999 (aged 19)	1.90 m (6 ft 3 in)
(New Zealand)	Ameliaranne Ekenasio	GS, GA	11 January 1991 (aged 28)	1.86 m (6 ft 1 in)
(New Zealand)	Sulu Fitzpatrick	GD, GK	20 August 1992 (aged 26)	1.87 m (6 ft 2 in)
(New Zealand)	Maddy Gordon	C, WA, WD	16 January 2000 (aged 19)	1.74 m (5 ft 9 in)
(New Zealand)	Claire Kersten	WD, C	9 July 1989 (aged 29)	1.75 m (5 ft 9 in)
(New Zealand)	Tiana Metuarau	GA, WA, GS	15 January 2001 (aged 18)	1.83 m (6 ft 0 in)
(New Zealand)	Katrina Rore (c)	GK, GD, WD	6 May 1987 (aged 31)	1.87 m (6 ft 2 in)
(New Zealand)	Whitney Souness	C, WA	12 November 1995 (aged 23)	1.74 m (5 ft 9 in)
(New Zealand)	Elle Temu	GK, GD	3 August 1999 (aged 19)	1.88 m (6 ft 2 in)

Head coach

- (New Zealand) Yvette McCausland-Durie

Assistant coach

- (New Zealand) Sandra Edge

Manager: Joanne Holmes
High Performance Director/Specialist Coach:
Waimarama Taumaunu
Specialist Coach:
Irene van Dyk
Physiotherapist:
Tim Doyvbsch
Strength and conditioning:
Adam Allen
Athlete Life: Helen Regan
Nutrition: Rebecca Jones
Mental Skills: Natalie Hogg

Notes

- (c) – Captain
- (cc) – Co-captain
- (vc) – Vice-captain
- – Injury / maternity leave
- (TRP) – Temporary Replacement Player

== Pre-season ==
In early February, Pulse traveled to Brisbane and played a series of matches against Queensland Fusion and the Queensland under-19 team. Pulse also hosted the official ANZ Premiership pre-season tournament at Te Wānanga o Raukawa in Ōtaki on February 8–10.

Fri 8 Feb	Central Pulse	64–45	Mainland Tactix	Te Wānanga o Raukawa
11:00am

Fri 8 Feb	Central Pulse	36–27	Waikato Bay of Plenty Magic	Te Wānanga o Raukawa
6:00 pm

Sat 9 Feb	Central Pulse	64–48	Northern Stars	Te Wānanga o Raukawa
11:00pm

Sat 9 Feb	Central Pulse	42–29	Northern Mystics	Te Wānanga o Raukawa
6:00 pm

Sun 10 Feb	Central Pulse	59–52	Southern Steel	Te Wānanga o Raukawa
1:00 pm

== Regular season ==
=== Fixtures and results ===
Round 1

Sun 24 Feb	Northern Mystics	39–62	Central Pulse	Claudelands Arena
6:10 pm	Kristina Brice 18/21 (86%); Bailey Mes 15/24 (63%); Jamie Hume 6/9 (67%)	Report; Stats	Aliyah Dunn 37/40 (93%); Ameliaranne Ekenasio 22/29 (76%); Tiana Metuarau 3/5 (60%)

Round 2

Mon 4 Mar	Waikato Bay of Plenty Magic	37–43	Central Pulse	Energy Events Centre
7:40 pm	Monica Falkner 16/21 (76%); Abigail Latu-Meafou 12/15 (80%); Kelsey McPhee 9/14 (64%)	Report; Stats	Aliyah Dunn 25/26 (96%); Ameliaranne Ekenasio 18/26 (69%)

Round 3

Sun 10 Mar	Central Pulse	52–40	Mainland Tactix	Fly Palmy Arena
4:10 pm	Aliyah Dunn 41/45 (91%); Tiana Metuarau 11/14 (79%)	Report; Stats	Ellie Bird 28/31 (90%); Kate Beveridge 8/10 (80%); Brooke Leaver 4/7 (57%)

Round 4

Mon 18 Mar	Northern Stars	50–61	Central Pulse	Pulman Arena
7:40 pm	Maia Wilson 35/43 (81%); Ellen Halpenny 6/10 (60%); Charlee Hodges 9/12 (75%)	Report; Stats	Aliyah Dunn 43/45 (96%); Ameliaranne Ekenasio 17/25 (68%); Tiana Metuarau 1/2 (50%)

Round 5

Mon 25 Mar	Central Pulse	54–50	Southern Steel	TSB Bank Arena
7:40 pm	Ameliaranne Ekenasio 34/37 (92%); Aliyah Dunn 20/23 (87%); Tiana Metuarau 0/3 (0%)	Report; Stats	Lenize Potgieter 23/27 (85%); Te Paea Selby-Rickit 18/19 (95%); Jennifer O'Connell 9/11 (82%)

Round 6

Sun 31 Mar	Central Pulse	48–33	Mainland Tactix	The Trusts Arena
2:10 pm	Ameliaranne Ekenasio 21/26 (81%); Tiana Metuarau 15/20 (75%); Aliyah Dunn 12/12 (100%)	Report; Stats	Ellie Bird 21/22 (95%); Kate Beveridge 10/14 (71%); Brooke Leaver 2/6 (33%)

Round 7

Wed 10 Apr	Southern Steel	50–66	Central Pulse	More FM Arena
7:40 pm	Lenize Potgieter 33/38 (87%); Te Paea Selby-Rickit 17/22 (77%)	Report; Stats	Aliyah Dunn 37/37 (100%); Ameliaranne Ekenasio 29/34 (85%)

Round 8

Wed 17 Apr	Central Pulse	59–49	Northern Mystics	Te Rauparaha Arena
7:40 pm	Aliyah Dunn 43/47 (91%); Tiana Metuarau 9/11 (82%); Ameliaranne Ekenasio 7/9 (78%)	Report; Stats	Grace Nweke 24/30 (80%); Bailey Mes 20/25 (80%); Jamie Hume 5/5 (100%)

Round 9

Sun 21 Apr	Central Pulse	54–33	Waikato Bay of Plenty Magic	TSB Bank Arena
4:10 pm	Aliyah Dunn 30/32 (94%); Ameliaranne Ekenasio 22/32 (69%); Tiana Metuarau 2/3 (67%)	Report; Stats	Monica Falkner 18/24 (75%); Kelsey McPhee 8/11 (73%); Abigail Latu-Meafou 4/7 (57%); Khiarna Williams 3/3 (100%)

Round 10

Mon 29 Apr	Mainland Tactix	44–62	Central Pulse	Horncastle Arena
7:40 pm	Ellie Bird 39/42 (93%); Kate Beveridge 4/8 (50%); Brooke Leaver 1/1 (100%)	Report; Stats	Aliyah Dunn 36/38 (95%); Ameliaranne Ekenasio 26/31 (84%); Tiana Metuarau 0/1 (0%)

Round 11

Sun 5 May	Waikato Bay of Plenty Magic	45–53	Central Pulse	Stadium Southland
2:10 pm	Kelsey McPhee 28/38 (74%); Monica Falkner 17/20 (85%)	Report; Stats	Ameliaranne Ekenasio 28/37 (76%); Aliyah Dunn 20/24 (83%); Tiana Metuarau 5/7 (71%)

Mon 6 May	Southern Steel	62–52	Central Pulse	Stadium Southland
7:40 pm	Lenize Potgieter 45/47 (96%); Te Paea Selby-Rickit 17/21 (81%); Georgia Heffernan 0/3 (0%)	Report; Stats	Aliyah Dunn 32/34 (94%); Ameliaranne Ekenasio 20/26 (77%)

Round 12

Mon 13 May	Central Pulse	68–42	Northern Stars	TSB Bank Arena
7:40 pm	Aliyah Dunn 28/34 (82%); Ameliaranne Ekenasio 33/37 (89%); Tiana Metuarau 7/9 (78%)	Report; Stats	Maia Wilson 32/40 (80%); Charlee Hodges 7/12 (58%); Ellen Halpenny 3/10 (30%)

Round 13

Mon 20 May	Northern Mystics	60–54	Central Pulse	The Trusts Arena
7:40 pm	Grace Nweke 47/58 (81%); Bailey Mes 13/19 (68%)	Report; Stats	Aliyah Dunn 39/44 (89%); Ameliaranne Ekenasio 9/17 (53%); Tiana Metuarau 6/9 (67%)

=== Final standings ===
2019 ANZ Premiership ladder
Pos	Team	P	W	L	GF	GA	GD	G%	BP	Pts
1	Central Pulse	15	13	2	856	676	180	126.6	0	39
2	Southern Steel	15	12	3	946	809	137	116.9	2	38
3	Northern Stars	15	6	9	785	840	-55	93.5	3	21
4	Waikato Bay of Plenty Magic	15	5	10	713	793	-80	89.9	0	15
5	Mainland Tactix	15	5	10	740	849	-109	87.2	0	15
6	Northern Mystics	15	4	11	786	859	-73	91.5	2	14

Qualified for Grand final
Qualified for Elimination final

== Finals Series ==
=== Grand final ===
Mon 3 Jun; 2.00pm	Central Pulse	52–48	Northern Stars	Te Rauparaha Arena	Sky Sport
Mon 3 Jun; 2.00pm	Scoring by quarter: 12–10, 27–25, 40–34, 52–48			Te Rauparaha Arena	Sky Sport
Mon 3 Jun; 2.00pm	Aliyah Dunn 40/43 (93%); Ameliaranne Ekenasio 12/19 (63%)		Maia Wilson 34/41 (83%); Charlee Hodges 14/20 (70%)	Te Rauparaha Arena	Sky Sport

== National Netball League ==
With a team featuring Api Taufa, Ainsleyana Puleiata and Saviour Tui, Pulse's reserve team, now renamed Central Manawa, won the 2019 National Netball League title after defeating Waikato Bay of Plenty 49–46 in the grand final.

== Award winners ==
=== New Zealand Netball Awards ===
Award	Winner
Silver Ferns Player of the Year	Ameliaranne Ekenasio
ANZ Premiership Coach of the Year	Yvette McCausland-Durie

=== Team of the season ===
Four Pulse players were included in Stuff's team of the season, selected by Brendon Egan.

Position	Player
GA	Ameliaranne Ekenasio
C	Claire Kersten
WD	Karin Burger
GD	Katrina Rore
Coach	Yvette McCausland-Durie
