= 2018 Central Pulse season =

Central Pulse season

Central Pulse
- 2018 season
- Head coach: Yvette McCausland-Durie
- Asst. coach: Sandra Edge
- Manager: Joanne Holmes
- Captain: Katrina Grant
- Main venue: TSB Bank Arena

Season results
- Wins–losses: 16–5
- Regular season: 1st
- Finals placing: ANZ Premiership runners-up Super Club winners
- Team colours

Central Pulse seasons
- ← 2017 2019 →

The 2018 Central Pulse season saw the Central Pulse netball team compete in the 2018 ANZ Premiership and the 2018 Netball New Zealand Super Club. With a team coached by Yvette McCausland-Durie, captained by Katrina Grant and featuring Karin Burger, Aliyah Dunn, Ameliaranne Ekenasio, Sulu Fitzpatrick and Claire Kersten, Central Pulse finished the regular season as minor premiers. However, in the grand final Southern Steel defeated Pulse 54–53. However, Pulse subsequently won the 2018 Netball New Zealand Super Club tournament, defeating Mainland Tactix 61–56 in the final.

== Players ==
=== Player movements ===
Gains and losses
▲ Gains	▼ Losses
Aliyah Dunn (Southern Steel); Ameliaranne Ekenasio (maternity leave); Sulu Fitzpatrick (Northern Stars); Mila Reuelu-Buchanan (Central Zone)	Te Amo Amaru-Tibble; Eseta Autagavaia; Sara Bayman (UWS Sirens); Sheridan Bignall; Jermaine Howard-Vallance (Central Zone); Phoenix Karaka (Northern Mystics); Cathrine Tuivaiti (Adelaide Thunderbirds)

=== 2018 roster ===
2018 Central Pulse roster
Players
Coaching staff

Nat.	Name	Position(s)	DoB	Height
(New Zealand)	Karin Burger	GD, WD, GK	12 April 1993 (aged 25)	1.84 m (6 ft 0 in)
(New Zealand)	Aliyah Dunn	GS, GA	19 October 1999 (aged 18)	1.90 m (6 ft 3 in)
(New Zealand)	Ameliaranne Ekenasio	GS, GA	11 January 1991 (aged 27)	1.86 m (6 ft 1 in)
(New Zealand)	Sulu Fitzpatrick	GD, GK	20 August 1992 (aged 25)	1.87 m (6 ft 2 in)
(New Zealand)	Katrina Grant (c)	GK, GD, WD	6 May 1987 (aged 31)	1.87 m (6 ft 2 in)
(New Zealand)	Maddy Gordon^{1}	C, WA, WD	16 January 2000 (aged 18)	1.74 m (5 ft 9 in)
(New Zealand)	Claire Kersten	WD, C	9 July 1989 (aged 28)	1.75 m (5 ft 9 in)
(New Zealand)	Paris Lokotui^{1}	WD, C	17 October 2001 (aged 16)	1.82 m (6 ft 0 in)
(New Zealand)	Tiana Metuarau	GA, WA, GS	15 January 2001 (aged 17)	1.83 m (6 ft 0 in)
(New Zealand)	Mila Reuelu-Buchanan	WA, C	11 May 1998 (aged 19)	1.72 m (5 ft 8 in)
(New Zealand)	Rene Savai'inaea	WD, GD, C	15 July 2000 (aged 17)	1.79 m (5 ft 10 in)
(New Zealand)	Whitney Souness	C, WA	12 November 1995 (aged 22)	1.74 m (5 ft 9 in)
(New Zealand)	Elle Temu^{1}	GK, GD	3 August 1999 (aged 18)	1.88 m (6 ft 2 in)
(New Zealand)	Saviour Tui^{1}	GS, GA	17 October 2001 (aged 16)	1.89 m (6 ft 2 in)

Head coach

- (New Zealand) Yvette McCausland-Durie

Assistant coach

- (New Zealand) Sandra Edge

Manager: Joanne Holmes
Strength and conditioning:
Adam Allen

Notes

- (c) – Captain
- (cc) – Co-captain
- (vc) – Vice-captain
- – Injury / maternity leave
- (TRP) – Temporary Replacement Player

Notes

- ^1 Four Central Zone players, Maddy Gordon, Paris Lokotui, Elle Temu and Saviour Tui were added to the squad for the 2018 Netball New Zealand Super Club.

== Pre-season ==
Pulse hosted the official ANZ Premiership pre-season tournament at Te Wānanga o Raukawa in Otaki between 20 and 22 April.

Fri 20 April	Central Pulse	64–46	Waikato Bay of Plenty Magic	Te Wānanga o Raukawa
4:00 pm

Sat 21 April	Central Pulse	64–40	Southern Steel	Te Wānanga o Raukawa
12:00 pm

Sat 21 April	Central Pulse	48–29	Northern Stars	Te Wānanga o Raukawa
7:00 pm

Sun 22 April	Central Pulse	59–46	Northern Mystics	Te Wānanga o Raukawa
2:00 pm

== ANZ Premiership regular season ==
=== Fixtures and results ===
Round 1

Sun 6 May	Central Pulse	45–33	Waikato Bay of Plenty Magic	Fly Palmy Arena
4:10 pm	Aliyah Dunn 15/17 (88%); Ameliaranne Ekenasio 20/28 (71%); Tiana Metuarau 10/11 (91%)	Report; Stats	Monica Falkner 8/12 (67%); Amorangi Malesala 23/29 (79%); Harley Smith 2/5 (40%)

Mon 7 May	Central Pulse	62–51	Southern Steel	Fly Palmy Arena
7:40 pm	Aliyah Dunn 41/45 (91%); Tiana Metuarau 21/22 (95%)	Report; Stats	Jennifer O'Connell 33/39 (85%); Te Paea Selby-Rickit 18/27 (67%)

Round 2

Mon 14 May	Central Pulse	52–44	Mainland Tactix	TSB Bank Arena
7:40 pm	Aliyah Dunn 33/40 (83%); Ameliaranne Ekenasio 3/4 (75%); Tiana Metuarau 16/17 (94%)	Report; Stats	Kate Beveridge 18/25 (72%); Ellie Bird 13/17 (76%); Brooke Leaver 13/16 (81%)

Round 3

Sun 20 May	Waikato Bay of Plenty Magic	46–61	Central Pulse	Claudelands Arena
4:10 pm	Monica Falkner 4/7 (57%); Lenize Potgieter 40/43 (93%); Harley Smith 2/4 (50%)	Report; Stats	Aliyah Dunn 38/40 (95%); Ameliaranne Ekenasio 14/18 (78%); Tiana Metuarau 9/12 (75%)

Round 4

Wed 30 May	Central Pulse	71–40	Southern Steel	Te Rauparaha Arena
7:40 pm	Aliyah Dunn 50/54 (93%); Ameliaranne Ekenasio 12/19 (63%); Tiana Metuarau 9/12 (75%)	Report; Stats	Olivia Bates 1/3 (33%); Jennifer O'Connell 21/26 (81%); Te Paea Selby-Rickit 18/27 (67%)

Round 5

Sun 3 Jun	Northern Mystics	38–60	Central Pulse	The Trusts Arena
6:10 pm	Jamie Hume 19/28 (68%); Bailey Mes 19/27 (70%)	Report; Stats	Aliyah Dunn 39/42 (93%); Ameliaranne Ekenasio 16/18 (89%); Tiana Metuarau 5/7 (71%)

Round 6

Sun 10 Jun	Central Pulse	51–52	Northern Mystics	Horncastle Arena
4:10 pm	Aliyah Dunn 36/40 (90%); Ameliaranne Ekenasio 6/10 (60%); Tiana Metuarau 9/10 (90%)	Report; Stats	Maria Folau 22/25 (88%); Jamie Hume 7/9 (78%); Bailey Mes 23/26 (88%)

Round 7

Sun 17 Jun	Central Pulse	63–48	Waikato Bay of Plenty Magic	TSB Bank Arena
2:10 pm	Aliyah Dunn 45/49 (92%); Tiana Metuarau 18/20 (90%)	Report; Stats	Monica Falkner 15/20 (75%); Lenize Potgieter 33/35 (94%)

Round 8

Mon 25 Jun	Central Pulse	66–50	Northern Stars	Te Rauparaha Arena
7:40 pm	Aliyah Dunn 40/43 (93%); Tiana Metuarau 26/30 (87%)	Report; Stats	Paula Griffin 2/4 (50%); Ellen Halpenny 7/8 (88%); Maia Wilson 41/42 (98%)

Round 9

Mon 2 Jul	Southern Steel	51–47	Central Pulse	ILT Stadium Southland
7:40 pm	Jennifer O'Connell 30/37 (81%); Te Paea Selby-Rickit 21/28 (75%)	Report; Stats	Aliyah Dunn 22/23 (96%); Ameliaranne Ekenasio 11/12 (92%); Tiana Metuarau 14/20 (70%)

Round 10

Wed 11 Jul	Mainland Tactix	36–47	Central Pulse	Horncastle Arena
7:40 pm	Ellie Bird 19/24 (79%); Kate Beveridge 10/13 (77%); Brooke Leaver 7/7 (100%); Gemma Hazeldine 0/1 (0%)	Report; Stats	Aliyah Dunn 25/29 (86%); Tiana Metuarau 13/16 (81%); Ameliaranne Ekenasio 9/11 (82%)

Round 11

Sun 15 Jul	Northern Stars	50–65	Central Pulse	Vodafone Events Centre
4:10 pm	Maia Wilson 32/34 (94%); Paula Griffin 17/21 (81%); Ellen Halpenny 1/2 (50%)	Report; Stats	Aliyah Dunn 40/44 (91%); Ameliaranne Ekenasio 13/17 (76%); Tiana Metuarau 12/14 (86%)

Round 12

Sun 22 Jul	Mainland Tactix	44–39	Central Pulse	Vodafone Events Centre
2:10 pm	Ellie Bird 35/41 (85%); Kate Beveridge 6/8 (75%); Brooke Leaver 3/5 (60%)	Report; Stats	Aliyah Dunn 17/20 (85%); Ameliaranne Ekenasio 14/16 (88%); Tiana Metuarau 8/12 (67%)

Mon 23 Jul	Northern Stars	48–66	Central Pulse	Vodafone Events Centre
7:40 pm	Maia Wilson 38/43 (88%); Ellen Halpenny 7/13 (54%); Paula Griffin 3/4 (75%)	Report; Stats	Aliyah Dunn 31/32 (97%); Ameliaranne Ekenasio 29/35 (83%); Tiana Metuarau 6/7 (86%)

Round 13

Wed 1 Aug	Central Pulse	55–48	Northern Mystics	TSB Bank Arena
7:40 pm	Ameliaranne Ekenasio 30/37 (81%); Aliyah Dunn 20/24 (83%); Tiana Metuarau 5/5 (100%)	Report; Stats	Maria Folau 33/44 (75%); Bailey Mes 15/20 (75%)

=== Final standings ===
2018 ANZ Premiership ladder
Pos	Team	P	W	L	GF	GA	GD	G%	BP	Pts
1	Central Pulse	15	12	3	850	679	+171	125.2	3	27
2	Southern Steel	15	10	5	874	866	+8	100.9	2	22
3	Mainland Tactix	15	7	8	746	761	−15	98	5	19
4	Northern Mystics	15	7	8	783	796	−13	98.4	3	17
5	Waikato Bay of Plenty Magic	15	5	10	804	878	−74	91.6	3	13
6	Northern Stars	15	4	11	832	909	−77	91.5	5	13

Qualified for Grand final and the 2018 Netball New Zealand Super Club
Qualified for Elimination final and the 2018 Netball New Zealand Super Club

== ANZ Premiership Finals Series ==
=== Grand final ===
Sun 12 Aug; 4:15 pm	Central Pulse	53–54	Southern Steel	Fly Palmy Arena	Sky Sport
Sun 12 Aug; 4:15 pm	Scoring by quarter: 16–14, 14–14, 12–14, 11–16			Fly Palmy Arena	Sky Sport
Sun 12 Aug; 4:15 pm	Aliyah Dunn 32/35 (91%); Ameliaranne Ekenasio 17/25 (68%); Tiana Metuarau 4/4 (100%)		Jen O'Connell 40/44 (91%); Te Paea Selby-Rickit 14/18 (78%)	Fly Palmy Arena	Sky Sport

== Netball New Zealand Super Club ==
=== Group stage ===
19 August 2018	Central Pulse	66–33	UWS Sirens	Trafalgar Centre
4.50pm	Aliyah Dunn 29/44 (66%); Saviour Tui 14/36 (39%); Mila Reuelu-Buchanan 0/1 (0%)	Stats	Bethan Goodwin 17/27 (63%); Emma Barrie 4/4 (100%); Laura Towell 4/6 (67%); Monica Falkner 4/8 (50%)

20 August 2018	Central Pulse	49–50	NSWIS	Trafalgar Centre
8.30pm	Aliyah Dunn 21/26 (81%); Ameliaranne Ekenasio 11/32 (34%); Saviour Tui 3/5 (60%)	Stats	Georgia Marshall 24/33 (73%); Kelly Singleton 9/14 (64%); Matisse Letherbarrow 7/10 (70%)

21 August 2018	Central Pulse	81–35	Marama Vou	Trafalgar Centre
6.40pm	Aliyah Dunn 20/29 (69%); Ameliaranne Ekenasio 26/39 (67%); Saviour Tui 10/15 (67%); Tiana Metuarau 6/10 (60%)	Report; Stats	Laisani Waqa 13/20 (65%); Alyssa-Jean Savelio 11/22 (50%); Kayla Kiss 0/3 (0%)

=== Final ladder ===
Group B
Pos	Team	P	W	D	L	GF	GA	%	BP	Pts
1	(New Zealand) Central Pulse	3	2	0	1	196	118	166.1	1	7
2	(Australia) NSWIS	3	3	0	0	178	149	119.5	0	9
3	(Fiji) Marama Vou	3	1	0	2	146	209	69.9	0	3
4	(Scotland) UWS Sirens	3	0	0	3	139	183	76.0	0	0

Qualified for Semi-finals
5th/8th place classification

=== 1st/4th Play offs ===
Semi-finals

23 August 2018	Central Pulse	64–55	Southern Steel	Trafalgar Centre
8.30pm	Aliyah Dunn 34/39 (87%); Ameliaranne Ekenasio 18/26 (69%); Tiana Metuarau 3/6 (50%)	Stats	Jennifer O'Connell 28/35 (80%); Georgia Heffernan 13/26 (50%); Olivia Bates 4/8 (50%)

Final

24 August 2018; 8.30pm	Central Pulse	61–56	Mainland Tactix	Trafalgar Centre	Sky Sport
24 August 2018; 8.30pm	Aliyah Dunn 35/39 (90%); Ameliaranne Ekenasio 16/30 (53%); Tiana Metuarau 2/2 (100%)		Ellie Bird 30/38 (79%); Kate Beveridge 15/19 (79%); Brooke Leaver 4/8 (50%)	Trafalgar Centre	Sky Sport

== National Netball League ==
With a team featuring Maddy Gordon, Saviour Tui and Ainsleyana Puleiata, Pulse's reserve team, Central Zone won the 2018 National Netball League title after defeating Waikato Bay of Plenty 62–53 in the grand final.

== Award winners ==
=== New Zealand Netball Awards ===
Award	Winner
ANZ Premiership Player of the Year	Katrina Grant

=== Team of the season ===
Three Central Pulse players were named in Brendon Egan's Stuff Seven team of the season.

Position	Player
GS	Aliyah Dunn
WD	Karin Burger
GD	Katrina Grant
