= 2017 Central Pulse season =

Central Pulse season

Central Pulse
- 2017 season
- Head coach: Yvette McCausland-Durie
- Asst. coach: Sandra Edge
- Manager: Jo Holmes
- Captain: Katrina Grant
- Main venue: TSB Bank Arena

Season results
- Wins–losses: 12–10
- Regular season: 2nd
- Finals placing: ANZ Premiership runners-up Super Club 4th place
- Team colours

Central Pulse seasons
- ← 2016 2018 →

The 2017 Central Pulse season saw the Central Pulse netball team compete in the 2017 ANZ Premiership and the 2017 Netball New Zealand Super Club. With a team coached by Yvette McCausland-Durie, captained by Katrina Grant and featuring Cathrine Tuivaiti, Pulse finished the 2017 ANZ Premiership season as grand finalists and runners-up. In the grand final they lost 69–53 to Southern Steel. In the inaugural Netball New Zealand Super Club tournament, Pulse finished fourth.

== Players ==
=== Player movements ===
Gains and losses
▲ Gains	▼ Losses
Eseta Autagavaia (Central Zone); Sara Bayman (Manchester Thunder); Sheridan Bignall (Central Zone); Karin Burger (Central Zone); Jermaine Howard-Vallance (Central Zone); Tiana Metuarau (Central Zone); Kimiora Poi (Central Zone); Rene Savai'inaea (Central Zone); Cathrine Tuivaiti (Northern Mystics)	Ameliaranne Ekenasio (pregnancy); Blaze Leslie; Chelsea Locke; Jacinta Messer; Samon Nathan (Northern Mystics); Elias Scheres; Kate Wells; Maia Wilson (Northern Stars)

=== 2017 roster ===
2017 Central Pulse roster
Players
Coaching staff

Nat.	Name	Position(s)	DoB	Height
(New Zealand)	Te Amo Amaru-Tibble	GS, GA	11 May 1989 (aged 27)	1.82 m (6 ft 0 in)
(New Zealand)	Eseta Autagavaia	GS, GA	14 June 1996 (aged 20)	1.85 m (6 ft 1 in)
(England)	Sara Bayman	C, WA, WD	23 December 1984 (aged 32)	1.81 m (5 ft 11 in)
(New Zealand)	Sheridan Bignall	C, WD, WA	10 April 1992 (aged 24)	1.74 m (5 ft 9 in)
(New Zealand)	Karin Burger	GD, WD, GK	12 April 1993 (aged 23)	1.84 m (6 ft 0 in)
(New Zealand)	Katrina Grant (c)	GK, GD, WD	6 May 1987 (aged 29)	1.87 m (6 ft 2 in)
(New Zealand)	Jermaine Howard-Vallance	GS, GA	2 May 1997 (aged 19)	1.78 m (5 ft 10 in)
(New Zealand)	Phoenix Karaka	GD, GK, WD	6 November 1993 (aged 23)	1.86 m (6 ft 1 in)
(New Zealand)	Claire Kersten	WD, C	9 July 1989 (aged 27)	1.75 m (5 ft 9 in)
(New Zealand)	Tiana Metuarau	GA, WA, GS	15 January 2001 (aged 16)	1.83 m (6 ft 0 in)
(New Zealand)	Kimiora Poi	C, WA	1 November 1997 (aged 19)	1.68 m (5 ft 6 in)
(New Zealand)	Rene Savai'inaea	WD, GD, C	15 July 2000 (aged 16)	1.79 m (5 ft 10 in)
(New Zealand)	Whitney Souness	C, WA	12 November 1995 (aged 21)	1.74 m (5 ft 9 in)
(New Zealand)	Cathrine Tuivaiti	GS, GA	25 October 1986 (aged 30)	1.89 m (6 ft 2 in)

Head coach

- (New Zealand) Yvette McCausland-Durie

Assistant coach

- (New Zealand) Sandra Edge

Manager: Jo Holmes
Physiotherapist:
Nikki Lynch
Strength and conditioning:
Adam Allen
Director of High Performance:
Waimarama Taumaunu
Specialist Coach:
Irene van Dyk

Notes

- (c) – Captain
- (cc) – Co-captain
- (vc) – Vice-captain
- – Injury / maternity leave
- (TRP) – Temporary Replacement Player

== Pre-season ==
In March 2017, Central Pulse and Netball Central hosted the official ANZ Premiership pre-season tournament at Te Wānanga o Raukawa in Ōtaki. All six teams participated in the three day tournament.

5 March 2017	Central Pulse	75–30	Taranaki Invitational	TSB Stadium
	Cathrine Tuivaiti 33/36 (92%)	Report

10 March 2017	Central Pulse	53–40	Northern Mystics	Te Wānanga o Raukawa
	Tiana Metuarau 32/38 (84%); Te Amo Amaru-Tibble 21/27 (78%)	Report	Tera-Maria Amani 20/24 (83%); Bailey Mes 12/16 (75%); Lahaina-Lee Upu-Toparea 8/11 (73%)

11 March 2017	Central Pulse	48–53	Southern Steel	Te Wānanga o Raukawa
	Tiana Metuarau 26/30 (87%); Te Amo Amaru-Tibble 21/24 (88%); Mila Reuelu-Buchanan 1/2 (50%)	Report	Jhaniele Fowler-Reid 31/35 (89%); Te Paea Selby-Rickit 19/24 (79%); Jamie Hume 3/12 (25%)

11 March 2017	Central Pulse	45–30 ^{(Note 1)}	Waikato Bay of Plenty Magic	Te Wānanga o Raukawa
	Tiana Metuarau 18/22 (82%); Te Amo Amaru-Tibble 18/24 (75%); Cathrine Tuivaiti 9/10 (90%)	Report	Lenize Potgieter 17/18 (94%); Monica Falkner 11/15 (73%); Grace Rasmussen 2/3 (67%)

12 March 2017	Central Pulse	45–44	Northern Stars	Te Wānanga o Raukawa
	Tiana Metuarau 22/27 (81%); Te Amo Amaru-Tibble 20/26 (77%); Cathrine Tuivaiti 3/4 (75%)	Report	Malia Vaka 24/29 (83%); Afa Rusivakula 6/10 (60%); Maia Wilson 14/15 (93%)

Notes

^1 40 minute game, 4 x 10 minute quarters.

== ANZ Premiership regular season ==
=== Fixtures and results ===
Round 1

26 March 2017	Northern Mystics	55–56	Central Pulse	Claudelands Arena
6:00 pm	Bailey Mes 24/27 (89%); Maria Tutaia 31/37 (84%)	Report; Stats	Te Amo Amaru-Tibble 7/10 (70%); Tiana Metuarau 16/19 (84%); Cathrine Tuivaiti 33/34 (97%)

Round 2

5 April 2017	Waikato Bay of Plenty Magic	52–50	Central Pulse	Energy Events Centre
7:40 pm	Monica Falkner 13/17 (76%); Lenize Potgieter 39/46 (85%)	Report; Stats	Te Amo Amaru-Tibble 13/17 (76%); Tiana Metuarau 14/19 (74%); Cathrine Tuivaiti 23/25 (92%)

Round 3

9 April 2017	Central Pulse	48–37	Mainland Tactix	TSB Bank Arena
2:00 pm	Te Amo Amaru-Tibble 11/14 (79%); Tiana Metuarau 13/18 (72%); Cathrine Tuivaiti 24/27 (89%)	Report; Stats	Kadeen Corbin 7/15 (47%); Brooke Leaver 14/15 (93%); Anna Thompson 16/18 (89%)

Round 4

17 April 2017	Northern Stars	44–53	Central Pulse	Vodafone Events Centre
7:40 pm	Afa Rusivakula 7/9 (78%); Malia Vaka 3/5 (60%); Maia Wilson 34/43 (79%)	Report; Stats	Te Amo Amaru-Tibble 4/6 (67%); Tiana Metuarau 18/22 (82%); Cathrine Tuivaiti 31/34 (91%)

Round 5

24 April 2017	Central Pulse	47–43	Northern Mystics	TSB Bank Arena
7:40 pm	Tiana Metuarau 19/23 (83%); Cathrine Tuivaiti 28/29 (97%)	Report; Stats	Bailey Mes 27/36 (75%); Maria Tutaia 16/26 (62%)

Round 6

30 April 2017	Central Pulse	49–50	Waikato Bay of Plenty Magic	Stadium Southland
2:00 pm	Tiana Metuarau 24/33 (73%); Cathrine Tuivaiti 25/28 (89%)	Report; Stats	Monica Falkner 17/19 (89%); Lenise Potgieter 33/38 (87%)

1 May 2017	Southern Steel	63–50	Central Pulse	Stadium Southland
7:40 pm	Jhaniele Fowler-Reid 49/54 (91%); Te Paea Selby-Rickit 14/23 (61%)	Report; Stats	Tiana Metuarau 24/31 (77%); Cathrine Tuivaiti 26/26 (100%)

Round 7

8 May 2017	Central Pulse	55—37	Northern Stars	TSB Bank Arena
7:40 pm	Tiana Metuarau 31/36 (86%); Cathrine Tuivaiti 22/23 (96%); Te Amo Amaru-Tibble 2/2 (100%)	Report	Maia Wilson 31/38 (82%); Malia Vaka 6/9 (67%)

Round 8

15 May 2017	Mainland Tactix	38—52	Central Pulse	Horncastle Arena
7:40 pm	Ellie Bird 30/36 (83%); Anna Thompson 5/6 (83%); Brooke Leaver 2/5 (40%); Kadeen Corbin 1/3 (33%)	Report; Stats	Tiana Metuarau 25/28 (89%); Cathrine Tuivaiti 26/27 (96%); Te Amo Amaru-Tibble 1/2 (50%)

Round 9

24 May 2017	Central Pulse	44—80	Southern Steel	Te Rauparaha Arena
7:40 pm	Cathrine Tuivaiti 26/28 (93%); Tiana Metuarau 11/18 (61%); Te Amo Amaru-Tibble 7/8 (88%)	Report; Stats	Jhaniele Fowler-Reid 66/70 (94%); Te Paea Selby-Rickit 14/21 (67%); Jamie Hume 0/2 (0%)

Round 10

31 May 2017	Northern Mystics	64–53	Central Pulse	North Shore Events Centre
7:40 pm	Maria Tutaia 30/37 (81%); Bailey Mes 34/38 (89%)	Report; Stats	Cathrine Tuivaiti 36/36 (100%); Tiana Metuarau 12/20 (60%); Te Amo Amaru-Tibble 5/5 (100%)

Round 11

5 June 2017	Central Pulse	62–45	Waikato Bay of Plenty Magic	Central Energy Trust Arena
7:40pm	Cathrine Tuivaiti 31/33 (94%); Tiana Metuarau 31/36 (86%)	Report; Stats	Lenize Potgieter 34/37 (92%); Amorangi Malesala 3/4 (75%); Monica Falkner 6/7 (86%); Grace Rasmussen 2/2 (100%)

Round 12

11 June 2017	Central Pulse	56–37	Mainland Tactix	The Trusts Arena
6:00 pm	Cathrine Tuivaiti 28/28 (100%); Tiana Metuarau 28/34 (82%)	Report; Stats	Ellie Bird 19/26 (73%); Brooke Leaver 13/17 (76%); Anna Thompson 5/8 (63%)

14 June 2017	Central Pulse	57–47	Northern Stars	Te Rauparaha Arena
8:00 pm	Cathrine Tuivaiti 35/36 (97%); Tiana Metuarau 22/27 (81%)	Report; Stats	Maia Wilson 20/22 (91%); Malia Vaka 12/16 (75%); Afa Rusivakula 15/23 (65%)

Round 13

19 June 2017	Southern Steel	64–51	Central Pulse	Stadium Southland
7:40 pm	Jhaniele Fowler-Reid 51/53 (96%); Jamie Hume 6/8 (75%); Olivia Bates 4/4 (100%); Jennifer O'Connell 3/6 (50%)	Report; Stats	Cathrine Tuivaiti 28/29 (97%); Tiana Metuarau 12/15 (80%); Te Amo Amaru-Tibble 11/12 (92%)

=== Final standings ===
2017 ANZ Premiership ladder
Pos	Team	P	W	L	GF	GA	GD	G%	BP	Pts
1	Southern Steel	15	15	0	1062	812	250	130.79%	0	30
2	Central Pulse	15	9	6	783	756	27	103.57%	2	20
3	Northern Mystics	15	8	7	878	851	27	111.35%	3	19
4	Waikato Bay of Plenty Magic	15	7	8	873	848	25	102.95%	5	19
5	Northern Stars	15	4	11	738	868	-130	85.02%	1	9
6	Mainland Tactix	15	2	13	676	875	-199	77.26%	2	6

Qualified for Grand final and the 2017 Netball New Zealand Super Club
Qualified for Elimination final and the 2017 Netball New Zealand Super Club

== ANZ Premiership Finals Series ==
=== Elimination final ===
25 June 2017; 2:00 pm	Report; Stats	Central Pulse	59–52	Northern Mystics	TSB Bank Arena	Sky Sport
25 June 2017; 2:00 pm	Report; Stats	Scoring by quarter: 10–16, 28–30, 45–44, 59–52			TSB Bank Arena	Sky Sport
25 June 2017; 2:00 pm	Report; Stats	Cathrine Tuivaiti 35/37 (95%); Tiana Metuarau 24/28 (86%)		Maria Tutaia 33/35 (94%); Bailey Mes 19/24 (79%)	TSB Bank Arena	Sky Sport

=== Grand final ===
28 June; 7:40 pm	Stats	Southern Steel	69–53	Central Pulse	Stadium Southland	Sky Sport
28 June; 7:40 pm	Stats	Scoring by quarter: 18–10, 35–20, 55–38, 69–53			Stadium Southland	Sky Sport
28 June; 7:40 pm	Stats	Jhaniele Fowler-Reid 56/60 (93%); Te Paea Selby-Rickit 13/19 (68%)		Tiana Metuarau 27/30 (90%); Cathrine Tuivaiti 26/29 (90%)	Stadium Southland	Sky Sport

== Netball New Zealand Super Club ==
=== Group stage ===
2 July 2017	Central Pulse	65–41	Celtic Flames	Trafalgar Centre
	Te Amo Amaru-Tibble 25/28 (89%); Cathrine Tuivaiti 24/29 (83%); Jermaine Howard-Vallance 15/18 (83%); Eseta Autagavaia 1/2 (50%)	Report; Stats	Chelsea Lewis 18/27 (67%); Anna Thompson 12/18 (67%); Georgia Rowe 11/11 (100%)

3 July 2017	Northern Mystics	59–54	Central Pulse	Trafalgar Centre
8:30pm	Bailey Mes 31/34 (91%); Maria Tutaia 28/33 (85%)	Stats	Cathrine Tuivaiti 32/34 (94%); Te Amo Amaru-Tibble 22/24 (92%)

5 July 2017	Central Pulse	67–50	Marama Vou	Trafalgar Centre
	Cathrine Tuivaiti 36/38 (95%); Te Amo Amaru-Tibble 18/20 (90%); Jermaine Howard-Vallance 7/10 (70%); Eseta Autagavaia 6/9 (67%)	Stats	Afa Rusivakula 38/44 (86%); Brooke Leaver 11/12 (92%); Maria Lutua 1/2 (50%)

Group B
Pos	Team	P	W	D	L	GF	GA	Pts
1	(New Zealand) Northern Mystics	3	3	0	0	217	140	6
2	(New Zealand) Central Pulse	3	2	0	1	186	150	4
3	(Wales) Celtic Flames	3	1	0	2	152	172	2
4	(Fiji) Marama Vou	3	0	0	3	134	227	0

Qualified for Semi-finals
5th/8th place classification

=== 1st/4th Play offs ===
Semi-finals

6 July 2017	Southern Steel	70–54	Central Pulse	Trafalgar Centre
6:40pm	Jhaniele Fowler-Reid 55/59 (93%); Te Paea Selby-Rickit 12/15 (80%); Olivia Bates 3/7 (43%); Jamie Hume 0/1 (0%)	Stats	Cathrine Tuivaiti 30/30 (100%); Te Amo Amaru-Tibble 24/29 (83%)

Third place play-off

7 July 2017	Stats	NSWIS	48–46	Central Pulse	Trafalgar Centre	Sky Sport
7 July 2017	Stats	Scoring by quarter: 15–12, 21–29, 34–39, 48–46			Trafalgar Centre	Sky Sport
7 July 2017	Stats	Kristina Brice 30/39 (77%); Sophie Garbin 13/18 (72%); Georgia Marshall 5/8 (63%)		Te Amo Amaru-Tibble 29/33 (88%); Jermaine Howard-Vallance 12/19 (63%); Eseta Autagavaia 3/5 (60%); Cathrine Tuivaiti 2/2 (100%)	Trafalgar Centre	Sky Sport

== National Netball League ==
With a team featuring Karin Burger, Rhiarna Ferris, Tiana Metuarau, Kimiora Poi and Ainsleyana Puleiata, Pulse's reserve team, Central Zone won the 2017 National Netball League title after defeating Hellers Netball Mainland 43–41 in the grand final at The Trusts Arena.
