= 2020 ANZ Premiership season =

Netball league season

- League: ANZ Premiership
- Sport: Netball
- Duration: 15 March – 23 August
- Teams: 6
- TV partner: Sky Sport (New Zealand)
- Minor Premiers: Central Pulse
- Season MVP: Jane Watson (Mainland Tactix)
- Top scorer: Grace Nweke (Northern Mystics)

Finals
- Champions: Central Pulse
- Runners-up: Mainland Tactix

ANZ Premiership seasons
- ← 2019 2021 →

The 2020 ANZ Premiership season was the fourth season of Netball New Zealand's ANZ Premiership. With a team coached by Yvette McCausland-Durie, captained by Katrina Rore and featuring Karin Burger, Aliyah Dunn and Ameliaranne Ekenasio, Central Pulse finished the regular season as minor premiers. In the grand final, Pulse defeated Mainland Tactix 43–31, winning their second consecutive premiership. Throughout the season, Netball New Zealand had to deal with considerable disruption because of the COVID-19 pandemic. This initially saw the league suspended for April and May. On its return in June, Round 2 through to Round 7 matches were all played behind closed doors at a single venue. In August, all Round 10 and two Final Series matches were cancelled and the Grand final was played behind closed doors.

== Transfers ==
Player	2019 team	2020 team
Kelly Jury	Waikato Bay of Plenty Magic	Central Pulse
Te Paea Selby-Rickit	Southern Steel	Mainland Tactix
Courtney Elliot	Southern Steel	Northern Mystics
Sulu Fitzpatrick	Central Pulse	Northern Mystics
Saviour Tui	Central Manawa	Northern Mystics
Jamie Hume	Northern Mystics	Northern Stars
Vika Koloto	Northern Comets	Northern Stars
Lisa Mather	Waikato Bay of Plenty Magic	Northern Stars
Daystar Swift	Fire Service	Northern Stars
Ellen Halpenny	Northern Stars	Southern Steel
Kalifa McCollin	Celtic Dragons	Southern Steel
Holly Fowler	Northern Stars	Waikato Bay of Plenty Magic
Georgia Marshall	Canberra Giants	Waikato Bay of Plenty Magic
Erena Mikaere	Northern Mystics	Waikato Bay of Plenty Magic
Whitney Souness	Central Pulse	Waikato Bay of Plenty Magic
Kayla Cullen	Northern Stars	New South Wales Swifts
Charlee Hodges	Northern Stars	Adelaide Thunderbirds
Lenize Potgieter	Southern Steel; Queensland Firebirds	Adelaide Thunderbirds

== Head coaches and captains ==
Team	Head coach	Captain
Central Pulse	Yvette McCausland-Durie	Katrina Grant
Mainland Tactix	Marianne Delaney-Hoshek	Jane Watson
Northern Mystics	Helene Wilson	Phoenix Karaka
Northern Stars	Kiri Wills	Grace Kara
Southern Steel	Reinga Bloxham	Gina Crampton; Te Huinga Reo Selby-Rickit
Waikato Bay of Plenty Magic	Amigene Metcalfe	Samantha Winders

== Pre-season ==
=== 2019 Super Club ===
In December 2019 all six ANZ Premiership teams plus Collingwood Magpies from Suncorp Super Netball and Wasps Netball from the Netball Superleague competed in the 2019 Netball New Zealand Super Club. The staging of the 2019 Super Club was delayed because of the 2019 Netball World Cup. This effectively made it a pre-2020 season tournament for the teams involved. Magpies won the 2019 tournament after defeating Northern Mystics 49–42 in the final.

=== Otaki tournament ===
The official pre-season tournament was held at Te Wānanga o Raukawa in Otaki between 28 February and 1 March, with all six teams competing.

Day 1

Fri 28 Feb	Central Pulse	52–51	Mainland Tactix
11:00am

Fri 28 Feb	Southern Steel	62–57	Northern Mystics
1:00pm

Fri 28 Feb	Waikato Bay of Plenty Magic	60–52	Northern Stars
4:00pm

Fri 28 Feb	Central Pulse	42–25	Southern Steel
6:00 pm

Day 2

Sat 29 Feb	Central Pulse	61–42	Northern Stars
11:00pm

Sat 29 Feb	Waikato Bay of Plenty Magic	57–47	Southern Steel
1:00 pm

Sat 29 Feb	Mainland Tactix	56–50	Northern Mystics
4:00 pm

Sat 29 Feb	Central Pulse	39–36	Waikato Bay of Plenty Magic
6:00 pm

Day 3

Sun 1 Mar	Southern Steel	64–52	Northern Stars
9:00am

Sun 1 Mar	Mainland Tactix	62–53	Waikato Bay of Plenty Magic
11:00am

Sun 1 Mar	Central Pulse	69–55	Northern Mystics
1:00 pm

== Impact of COVID-19 pandemic ==
=== Season suspended ===
On 16 March 2020, due to the COVID-19 pandemic, the final match of Round 1, between Southern Steel and Waikato Bay of Plenty Magic, was played in an empty arena. On 20 March it was announced that Rounds 2 and 3 had been suspended. and on 26 March, Netball New Zealand announced that the whole season was suspended indefinitely.

=== Return ===
In May, Netball New Zealand announced that the season would resume in June. Rounds 2 to 7 would all subsequently be played behind closed doors at a single venue, Auckland Netball Centre. On the leagues return, some changes to the format were introduced, partly because of the pandemic. Matches would now feature 12 minute quarters with 10 minute half-time breaks. There was also a change to the points system. A win was now worth 4 points, a draw would equal 2 points and there was a bonus point for teams that only lost matches by 5 or less goals. The Finals Series was also due to feature 5th/6th and 3rd/4th place playoff matches as well as a Grand final. The season restarted on 19 June with a match between Northern Mystics and Waikato Bay of Plenty Magic.

== Regular season ==
=== Round 1 ===
Sun 15 Mar	Mainland Tactix	41–53	Central Pulse	Stadium 2000, Blenheim
4:10 pm	Ellie Bird 26/29 (90%); Te Paea Selby-Rickit 15/22 (68%)	Report; Stats	Aliyah Dunn 35/38 (92%); Ameliaranne Ekenasio 18/22 (82%)

Sun 15 Mar	Northern Stars	55–59	Northern Mystics	Pulman Arena
6:10 pm	Maia Wilson 40/45 (89%); Jamie Hume 15/24 (63%)	Report; Stats	Grace Nweke 40/43 (93%); Saviour Tui 16/20 (80%); Asher Grapes 3/7 (43%)

Mon 16 Mar	Southern Steel	48–54	Waikato Bay of Plenty Magic	More FM Arena
7:15 pm	Jennifer O'Connell 35/50 (70%); Kalifa McCollin 9/12 (75%); Georgia Heffernan 4/6 (67%)	Report; Stats	Kelsey McPhee 35/43 (81%); Abigail Latu-Meafou 19/27 (70%)

=== Round 2 ===
Fri 19 Jun	Waikato Bay of Plenty Magic	40–47	Northern Mystics	Auckland Netball Centre
	Kelsey McPhee 26/38 (68%); Abigail Latu-Meafou 14/18 (78%)	Report; Stats	Grace Nweke 41/45 (91%); Saviour Tui 5/5 (100%); Asher Grapes 1/4 (25%)

Sat 20 Jun	Southern Steel	36–43	Mainland Tactix	Auckland Netball Centre
	Kalifa McCollin 22/27 (81%); Jennifer O'Connell 11/12 (92%); Georgia Heffernan 3/4 (75%)	Report; Stats	Ellie Bird 31/39 (79%); Te Paea Selby-Rickit 12/14 (86%)

Sun 21 Jun	Northern Stars	39–63	Central Pulse	Auckland Netball Centre
	Maia Wilson 30/36 (83%); Jamie Hume 7/10 (70%); Vika Koloto 2/3 (67%)	Stats	Aliyah Dunn 43/45 (96%); Ameliaranne Ekenasio 20/22 (91%)

Sun 21 Jun	Northern Stars	48–43	Mainland Tactix	Auckland Netball Centre
	Maia Wilson 37/40 (93%); Jamie Hume 12/19 (63%)	Stats	Te Paea Selby-Rickit 19/23 (83%); Ellie Bird 18/23 (78%); Jess Prosser 6/6 (100%)

=== Round 3 ===
Fri 26 Jun	Mainland Tactix	45–36	Waikato Bay of Plenty Magic	Auckland Netball Centre
	Ellie Bird 33/44 (75%); Te Paea Selby-Rickit 12/19 (63%)	Report; Stats	Kelsey McPhee 21/26 (81%); Abigail Latu-Meafou 15/21 (71%)

Sat 27 Jun	Northern Mystics	46–42	Southern Steel	Auckland Netball Centre
	Grace Nweke 35/40 (88%); Saviour Tui 11/14 (79%); Asher Grapes 0/2 (0%)	Report; Stats	Jennifer O'Connell 28/32 (88%); Kalifa McCollin 12/20 (60%); Georgia Heffernan 2/3 (67%)

Sun 28 Jun	Northern Stars	47–49	Southern Steel	Auckland Netball Centre
	Maia Wilson 37/42 (88%); Jamie Hume 10/15 (67%)	Report; Stats	Jennifer O'Connell 32/36 (89%); Kalifa McCollin 14/15 (93%); Georgia Heffernan 3/3 (100%)

Mon 29 Jun	Central Pulse	42–35	Northern Mystics	Auckland Netball Centre
	Ameliaranne Ekenasio 21/24 (88%); Aliyah Dunn 12/14 (86%); Tiana Metuarau 9/12 (75%)	Report; Stats	Grace Nweke 28/33 (85%); Saviour Tui 6/7 (86%); Asher Grapes 1/1 (100%)

=== Round 4 ===
Fri 3 Jul	Northern Mystics	47–42	Mainland Tactix	Auckland Netball Centre
	Grace Nweke 38/40 (95%); Saviour Tui 8/12 (67%); Asher Grapes 1/1 (100%)	Report; Stats	Ellie Bird 26/29 (90%); Te Paea Selby-Rickit 16/24 (67%)

Sat 4 Jul	Central Pulse	47–40	Southern Steel	Auckland Netball Centre
	Ameliaranne Ekenasio 25/25 (100%); Aliyah Dunn 22/22 (100%)	Report; Stats	Jennifer O'Connell 27/32 (84%); Kalifa McCollin 13/14 (93%)

Sun 5 Jul	Central Pulse	51–30	Waikato Bay of Plenty Magic	Auckland Netball Centre
	Aliyah Dunn 23/27 (85%); Ameliaranne Ekenasio 21/24 (88%); Tiana Metuarau 7/11 (64%)	Report; Stats	Kelsey McPhee 19/26 (73%); Khiarna Williams 8/11 (73%); Abigail Latu-Meafou 3/3 (100%)

Mon 6 Jul	Waikato Bay of Plenty Magic	46–46	Northern Stars	Auckland Netball Centre
	Kelsey McPhee 28/37 (76%); Abigail Latu-Meafou 17/20 (85%); Khiarna Williams 1/3 (33%)	Report; Stats	Maia Wilson 34/37 (92%); Jamie Hume 12/17 (71%)

=== Round 5 ===
Fri 10 Jul	Central Pulse	40–37	Southern Steel	Auckland Netball Centre
	Aliyah Dunn 23/25 (92%); Ameliaranne Ekenasio 17/20 (85%)	Report; Stats	Jennifer O'Connell 25/34 (74%); Kalifa McCollin 12/17 (71%)

Sat 11 Jul	Southern Steel	39–48	Northern Stars	Auckland Netball Centre
	Kalifa McCollin 27/29 (93%); Kiana Pelasio 6/10 (60%); Grace Namana 6/8 (75%)	Report; Stats	Maia Wilson 36/39 (92%); Jamie Hume 12/15 (80%)

Sun 12 Jul	Northern Stars	45–43	Waikato Bay of Plenty Magic	Auckland Netball Centre
	Maia Wilson 39/43 (91%); Jamie Hume 6/11 (55%)	Report; Stats	Kelsey McPhee 29/33 (88%); Abigail Latu-Meafou 14/17 (82%)

Sun 12 Jul	Mainland Tactix	41–40	Northern Mystics	Auckland Netball Centre
	Ellie Bird 20/25 (80%); Te Paea Selby-Rickit 21/24 (88%)	Report; Stats	Grace Nweke 29/32 (91%); Saviour Tui 10/11 (91%); Asher Grapes 1/3 (33%)

Mon 13 Jul	Mainland Tactix	46–46	Waikato Bay of Plenty Magic	Auckland Netball Centre
	Ellie Bird 30/35 (86%); Te Paea Selby-Rickit 14/17 (82%); Jess Prosser 2/6 (33%)	Report; Stats	Kelsey McPhee 23/29 (79%); Abigail Latu-Meafou 23/27; Khiarna Williams 0/1 (0%)

=== Round 6 ===
Fri 17 Jul	Northern Mystics	51–47	Northern Stars	Auckland Netball Centre
	Grace Nweke 36/45 (80%); Saviour Tui 10/11 (91%); Filda Vui 5/6 (83%)	Report; Stats	Maia Wilson 36/40 (90%); Jamie Hume 11/15 (73%)

Sat 18 Jul	Central Pulse	44–38	Northern Mystics	Auckland Netball Centre
	Aliyah Dunn 24/29 (83%); Ameliaranne Ekenasio 14/19 (74%); Tiana Metuarau 6/11 (55%)	Report; Stats	Grace Nweke 37/39 (95%); Saviour Tui 1/1 (100%)

Sun 19 Jul	Central Pulse	33–32	Mainland Tactix	Auckland Netball Centre
	Aliyah Dunn 13/13 (100%); Ameliaranne Ekenasio 13/16 (81%); Tiana Metuarau 7/11 (64%)	Report; Stats	Ellie Bird 24/28 (86%); Te Paea Selby-Rickit 8/11 (73%)

Sun 19 Jul	Southern Steel	41–40	Waikato Bay of Plenty Magic	Auckland Netball Centre
	Kalifa McCollin 24/30 (80%); Ellen Halpenny 9/9 (100%); Kiana Pelasio 8/11 (73%)	Report; Stats	Abigail Latu-Meafou 22/24 (92%); Kelsey McPhee 10/14 (71%); Khiarna Williams 8/10 (80%)

Mon 20 Jul	Southern Steel	35–48	Mainland Tactix	Auckland Netball Centre
	Kalifa McCollin 18/21 (86%); Ellen Halpenny 17/23 (74%); Kiana Pelasio 0/1 (0%)	Report; Stats	Ellie Bird 32/34 (94%); Te Paea Selby-Rickit 10/12 (83%); Jess Prosser 5/6 (83%); Hannah Glen 1/1 (100%)

=== Round 7 ===
Fri 24 Jul	Central Pulse	52–29	Waikato Bay of Plenty Magic	Auckland Netball Centre
	Aliyah Dunn 19/20 (95%); Ameliaranne Ekenasio 29/30; Tiana Metuarau 2/4 (50%); Grace McLean 2/2 (100%)	Report; Stats	Khiarna Williams 12/17 (71%); Kelsey McPhee 9/13 (69%); Abigail Latu-Meafou 6/10 (60%); Harley Smith 2/2 (100%)

Sat 25 Jul	Central Pulse	46–36	Northern Stars	Auckland Netball Centre
	Aliyah Dunn 27/30 (90%); Ameliaranne Ekenasio 19/20 (95%)	Report; Stats	Maia Wilson 29/35 (83%); Jamie Hume 7/13 (54%)

Sun 26 Jul	Mainland Tactix	47–40	Northern Stars	Auckland Netball Centre
	Ellie Bird 37/37 (100%); Te Paea Selby-Rickit 10/12 (83%)	Report; Stats	Maia Wilson 32/36 (89%); Jamie Hume 4/9 (44%)

Sun 26 Jul	Southern Steel	47–41	Northern Mystics	Auckland Netball Centre
	Kalifa McCollin 23/30 (77%); Ellen Halpenny 15/20 (75%); Kiana Pelasio 9/13 (69%)	Report; Stats	Grace Nweke 32/33 (97%); Saviour Tui 5/6 (83%); Filda Vui 4/6 (67%)

Mon 27 Jul	Northern Mystics	45–39	Waikato Bay of Plenty Magic	Auckland Netball Centre
	Grace Nweke 39/47 (83%); Saviour Tui 2/4 (50%); Filda Vui 4/5 (80%); Asher Grapes 0/4 (0%)	Report; Stats	Abigail Latu-Meafou 17/21 (81%); Kelsey McPhee 12/14 (86%); Khiarna Williams 10/13 (77%)

=== Round 8 ===
Thu 30 Jul	Mainland Tactix	52–42	Northern Stars	Horncastle Arena
	Ellie Bird 37/42 (88%); Te Paea Selby-Rickit 15/19 (79%)	Report; Stats	Maia Wilson 35/40 (88%); Jamie Hume 7/11 (64%)

Sat 1 Aug	Northern Stars	50–43	Southern Steel	Auckland Netball Centre
	Maia Wilson 39/39 (100%); Jamie Hume 11/15 (73%)	Report; Stats	Ellen Halpenny 26/29 (90%); Kalifa McCollin 17/18 (94%); Kiana Pelasio 0/1 (0%)

Sun 2 Aug	Waikato Bay of Plenty Magic	35–44	Mainland Tactix	Claudelands Arena
	Abigail Latu-Meafou 18/22 (82%); Kelsey McPhee 17/22 (77%)	Report; Stats	Ellie Bird 26/30 (87%); Te Paea Selby-Rickit 16/18 (89%); Jess Prosser 2/2 (100%)

Sun 2 Aug	Central Pulse	42–44	Northern Mystics	Te Rauparaha Arena
	Aliyah Dunn 21/23 (91%); Ameliaranne Ekenasio 20/28 (71%); Tiana Metuarau 1/2 (50%)	Report; Stats	Grace Nweke 38/44 (86%); Saviour Tui 4/4 (100%); Filda Vui 2/2 (100%)

Mon 3 Aug	Waikato Bay of Plenty Magic	37–36	Southern Steel	Claudelands Arena
	Kelsey McPhee 14/16 (88%); Khiarna Williams 13/18 (72%); Abigail Latu-Meafou 10/12 (83%)	Report; Stats	Kalifa McCollin 20/22 (91%); Ellen Halpenny 15/20 (75%); Kiana Pelasio 1/2 (50%)

=== Round 9 ===
Fri 7 Aug	Southern Steel	51–47	Northern Mystics	Stadium Southland
	Kalifa McCollin 32/36 (89%); Ellen Halpenny 19/23 (83%)	Report; Stats	Grace Nweke 41/44 (93%); Saviour Tui 4/4 (100%); Filda Vui 2/3 (67%)

Sat 8 Aug	Southern Steel	34–49	Central Pulse	Stadium Southland
	Kalifa McCollin 19/22 (86%); Ellen Halpenny 13/18 (72%); Grace Namana 2/2 (100%); Kiana Pelasio 0/2 (0%)	Report; Stats	Aliyah Dunn 30/32 (94%); Ameliaranne Ekenasio 19/20 (95%)

Sun 9 Aug	Northern Mystics	42–43	Mainland Tactix	The Trusts Arena
	Grace Nweke 37/42 (88%); Saviour Tui 4/6 (67%); Filda Vui 1/3 (33%)	Report; Stats	Ellie Bird 30/33 (91%); Te Paea Selby-Rickit 13/15 (87%)

Sun 9 Aug	Waikato Bay of Plenty Magic	45–46	Northern Stars	Claudelands Arena
	Kelsey McPhee 27/32 (84%); Abigail Latu-Meafou 15/17 (88%); Khiarna Williams 3/3 (100%)	Report; Stats	Maia Wilson 37/41 (90%); Jamie Hume 9/11 (82%)

Mon 10 Aug	Central Pulse	32–39	Mainland Tactix	TSB Bank Arena
	Aliyah Dunn 20/24 (83%); Tiana Metuarau 12/17 (71%)	Report; Stats	Ellie Bird 32/38 (84%); Te Paea Selby-Rickit 7/9 (78%)

=== Round 10 ===
On 12 August, after a change in the COVID-19 alert levels in New Zealand, Netball New Zealand announced that all five Round 10 matches would be cancelled. The five matches, which had no bearing on the final placings for the Finals Series, where all declared draws and each team was awarded two points.

Fri 14 Aug	Northern Mystics	drawn	Northern Stars	The Trusts Arena

Sat 15 Aug	Northern Mystics	drawn	Waikato Bay of Plenty Magic	The Trusts Arena

Sun 16 Aug	Southern Steel	drawn	Mainland Tactix	Edgar Centre

Sun 16 Aug	Central Pulse	drawn	Northern Stars	TSB Bank Arena

Mon 17 Aug	Central Pulse	drawn	Waikato Bay of Plenty Magic	TSB Bank Arena

== Final ladder ==
2020 ANZ Premiership ladder
Pos	Team	P	W	L	D	GF	GA	GD	G%	BP	Pts
1	Central Pulse	15	11	2	2	594	474	120	125.3	1	49
2	Mainland Tactix	15	9	4	2	606	566	40	107.1	2	42
3	Northern Mystics	15	7	6	2	582	475	7	101.2	3	35
4	Northern Stars	15	5	7	3	590	626	-36	94.2	3	29
5	Southern Steel	15	4	10	1	578	637	-59	90.7	3	21
6	Waikato Bay of Plenty Magic	15	2	9	4	520	592	-72	87.8	3	19

Qualified for Grand final
Qualified for 3rd/4th place match
Qualified for 5th/6th place match

Point System

- Win = 4 points
- Draw = 2 points
- Loss of 5 or less goals = 1 point
- Loss of more than 5 goals = 0 points

== Finals Series ==
The Finals Series was due to feature 5th/6th and 3rd/4th place playoff matches as well as a Grand final. However, the two Auckland Region-based teams, Northern Mystics and Northern Stars, were unable to travel because the region was in lockdown. Both playoff matches were subsequently cancelled and the Grand final was played behind closed doors.

=== 5th/6th place match ===
Sun 23 Aug	Southern Steel	v	Waikato Bay of Plenty Magic	Stadium Southland

=== 3rd/4th place match ===
Sun 23 Aug	Northern Mystics	v	Northern Stars	Stadium Southland

=== Grand final ===
Sun 23 Aug; 6.45pm	Stats	Central Pulse	43–31	Mainland Tactix	Stadium Southland	Sky Sport
Sun 23 Aug; 6.45pm	Stats	Scoring by quarter: 12–6, 23–13, 31–24, 43–31			Stadium Southland	Sky Sport
Sun 23 Aug; 6.45pm	Stats	Aliyah Dunn 28/30 (93%); Ameliaranne Ekenasio 15/18 (83%)		Ellie Bird 19/23 (83%); Te Paea Selby-Rickit 12/13 (92%)	Stadium Southland	Sky Sport

== Award winners ==
=== New Zealand Netball Awards ===
Award	Winner	Team
ANZ Premiership Player of the Year	Jane Watson	Mainland Tactix
ANZ Premiership Coach of the Year	Yvette McCausland-Durie	Central Pulse

=== ANZ Premiership Awards ===
Award	Winner	Team
Grand Final MVP	Maddy Gordon	Central Pulse
ANZ Premiership Coach of the Year	Yvette McCausland-Durie	Central Pulse

=== Team of the season ===
Brendon Egan selected Stuff's team of the season.

Position	Player	Team
GS	Maia Wilson	Northern Stars
GA	Ameliaranne Ekenasio	Central Pulse
WA	Gina Crampton	Southern Steel
C	Claire Kersten	Central Pulse
WD	Karin Burger	Central Pulse
GD	Jane Watson	Mainland Tactix
GK	Temalisi Fakahokotau	Mainland Tactix
Coach	Marianne Delaney-Hoshek	Mainland Tactix

== Season statistics ==
Goal Shooters (by Goals Scored)
Pos.	Player	Team	Goals (%)
1	Grace Nweke	Northern Mystics	471/527 (89%)
2	Maia Wilson	Northern Stars	461/513 (90%)
3	Ellie Bird	Mainland Tactix	421/489 (86%)
4	Aliyah Dunn	Central Pulse	340/372 (91%)
5	Kelsey McPhee	Waikato Bay of Plenty Magic	270/343 (79%)
6	Kalifa McCollin	Southern Steel	262/313 (84%)

Circle Feeds
Pos.	Player	Team	CF
1	Gina Crampton	Southern Steel	434
2	Grace Kara	Northern Stars	394
3	Whitney Souness	Waikato Bay of Plenty Magic	393
4	Erikana Pedersen	Mainland Tactix	384
5	Peta Toeava	Northern Mystics	368
6	Claire Kersten	Central Pulse	293

Deflections
Pos.	Player	Team	Def
1	Jane Watson	Mainland Tactix	72
2	Sulu Fitzpatrick	Northern Mystics	58
3	Erena Mikaere	Waikato Bay of Plenty Magic	53
4	Kate Burley	Northern Stars	49
5	Kelly Jury	Central Pulse	47
6	Taneisha Fifita	Southern Steel	37

Intercepts
Pos.	Player	Team	Inter.
1	Kelly Jury	Waikato Bay of Plenty Magic	26
2	Temalisi Fakahokotau	Mainland Tactix	22
2	Phoenix Karaka	Northern Mystics	22
2	Kate Burley	Northern Stars	22
5	Kate Heffernan	Southern Steel	18
6	Erena Mikaere	Waikato Bay of Plenty Magic	12
6	Sam Winders	Waikato Bay of Plenty Magic	12

Rebounds
Pos.	Player	Team	Reb.
1	Sulu Fitzpatrick	Northern Mystics	23
2	Erena Mikaere	Waikato Bay of Plenty Magic	21
3	Te Huinga Reo Selby-Rickit	Southern Steel	18
4	Temalisi Fakahokotau	Mainland Tactix	16
5	Katrina Rore	Central Pulse	16
6	Holly Fowler	Waikato Bay of Plenty Magic	10
