= 2019 ANZ Premiership season =

Netball league season

- League: ANZ Premiership
- Sport: Netball
- Duration: 24 February–2 June 2019
- Teams: 6
- TV partner: Sky Sport (New Zealand)
- Minor Premiers: Central Pulse
- Season MVP: Gina Crampton (Southern Steel)
- Top scorer: Maia Wilson (Northern Stars)

Finals
- Champions: Central Pulse
- Runners-up: Northern Stars

ANZ Premiership seasons
- ← 2018 2020 →

The 2019 ANZ Premiership season was the third season of Netball New Zealand's ANZ Premiership. With a team coached by Yvette McCausland-Durie, captained by Katrina Grant and featuring Karin Burger, Aliyah Dunn, Ameliaranne Ekenasio and Sulu Fitzpatrick, Central Pulse finished the regular season as minor premiers. In the grand final, Pulse defeated Northern Stars 52–48, winning their first premiership.

== Transfers ==
Player	2018 team	2019 team
Sophia Fenwick	NNL Mainland	Mainland Tactix
Kristina Brice	Giants Netball	Northern Mystics
Erena Mikaere	Sunshine Coast Lightning	Northern Mystics
Leana de Bruin	Adelaide Thunderbirds	Northern Stars
Charlee Hodges	Adelaide Thunderbirds	Northern Stars
Storm Purvis	Northern Mystics	Northern Stars
Mila Reuelu-Buchanan	Central Pulse	Northern Stars
Lenize Potgieter	Waikato Bay of Plenty Magic	Southern Steel
Abigail Latu-Meafou	Adelaide Thunderbirds	Waikato Bay of Plenty Magic
Ama Agbeze	Northern Stars	London Pulse
Maria Folau	Northern Mystics	Adelaide Thunderbirds

== Head coaches and captains ==
Team	Head coach	Captain
Central Pulse	Yvette McCausland-Durie	Katrina Grant
Mainland Tactix	Marianne Delaney-Hoshek	Jane Watson
Northern Mystics	Helene Wilson	Phoenix Karaka
Northern Stars	Kiri Wills	Leana de Bruin
Southern Steel	Reinga Bloxham	Gina Crampton; Te Huinga Reo Selby-Rickit
Waikato Bay of Plenty Magic	Amigene Metcalfe	Casey Kopua

== Pre-season ==
The official pre-season tournament was held at Te Wānanga o Raukawa in Otaki on February 8–10, with all six teams competing.

Day 1

Fri 8 Feb	Central Pulse	64–45	Mainland Tactix
11:00am

Fri 8 Feb	Waikato Bay of Plenty Magic	64–39	Northern Mystics
1:00pm

Fri 8 Feb	Southern Steel	63–47	Northern Stars
4:00pm

Fri 8 Feb	Central Pulse	36–27	Waikato Bay of Plenty Magic
6:00 pm

Day 2

Sat 9 Feb	Central Pulse	64–48	Northern Stars
11:00pm

Sat 9 Feb	Southern Steel	58–56	Northern Mystics
1:00 pm

Sat 9 Feb	Mainland Tactix	62–53	Waikato Bay of Plenty Magic
4:00 pm

Sat 9 Feb	Central Pulse	42–29	Northern Mystics
6:00 pm

Day 3

Sun 10 Feb	Northern Stars	62–51	Waikato Bay of Plenty Magic
9:00am

Sun 10 Feb	Mainland Tactix	67–50	Northern Mystics
11:00am

Sun 10 Feb	Central Pulse	59–52	Southern Steel
1:00 pm

== Regular season ==
=== Round 1 ===
The season was brought forward by two months to ensure it did not clash with the 2019 Netball World Cup. It began with a Super Sunday event hosted by Waikato Bay of Plenty Magic.

Sun 24 Feb	Southern Steel	64–66	Northern Stars	Claudelands Arena
2:10 pm	Lenize Potgieter 27/30 (90%); Te Paea Selby-Rickit 23/31 (74%); Jennifer O'Connell 14/15 (93%)	Report; Stats	Maia Wilson 51/57 (89%); Ellen Halpenny 14/16 (88%); Charlee Hodges 1/1 (100%)

Sun 24 Feb	Waikato Bay of Plenty Magic	42–48	Mainland Tactix	Claudelands Arena
4:10 pm	Monica Falkner 22/30 (73%); Abigail Latu-Meafou 20/25 (80%)	Report; Stats	Ellie Bird 40/41 (98%); Kate Beveridge 8/9 (89%)

Sun 24 Feb	Northern Mystics	39–62	Central Pulse	Claudelands Arena
6:10 pm	Kristina Brice 18/21 (86%); Bailey Mes 15/24 (63%); Jamie Hume 6/9 (67%)	Report; Stats	Aliyah Dunn 37/40 (93%); Ameliaranne Ekenasio 22/29 (76%); Tiana Metuarau 3/5 (60%)

Mon 25 Feb	Waikato Bay of Plenty Magic	57–51	Northern Stars	Claudelands Arena
7:40 pm	Abigail Latu-Meafou 34/37 (92%); Monica Falkner 23/27 (85%)	Report; Stats	Maia Wilson 35/41 (85%); Ellen Halpenny 10/14 (71%); Charlee Hodges 6/7 (86%)

Tue 26 Feb	Mainland Tactix	46–66	Southern Steel	Horncastle Arena
7:40 pm	Ellie Bird 29/33 (88%); Kate Beveridge 13/17 (76%); Brooke Leaver 4/7 (57%)	Report; Stats	Lenize Potgieter 39/42 (93%); Te Paea Selby-Rickit 11/18 (61%); Georgia Heffernan 8/12 (67%); Jennifer O'Connell 8/9 (89%)

=== Round 2 ===
Sat 2 Mar	Northern Mystics	48–67	Southern Steel	The Trusts Arena
4:10 pm	Bailey Mes 25/28 (89%); Jamie Hume 23/31 (74%)	Report; Stats	Lenize Potgieter 48/53 (91%); Te Paea Selby-Rickit 14/25 (56%); Jennifer O'Connell 5/8 (63%)

Mon 4 Mar	Waikato Bay of Plenty Magic	37–43	Central Pulse	Energy Events Centre
7:40 pm	Monica Falkner 16/21 (76%); Abigail Latu-Meafou 12/15 (80%); Kelsey McPhee 9/14 (64%)	Report; Stats	Aliyah Dunn 25/26 (96%); Ameliaranne Ekenasio 18/26 (69%)

Wed 6 Mar	Northern Stars	65–46	Mainland Tactix	Pulman Arena
7:40 pm	Maia Wilson 51/55 (93%); Ellen Halpenny 14/18 (78%); Charlee Hodges 0/1 (0%)	Report; Stats	Ellie Bird 36/39 (92%); Brooke Leaver 5/6 (83%); Kate Beveridge 5/7 (71%)

=== Round 3 ===
Sun 10 Mar	Central Pulse	52–40	Mainland Tactix	Fly Palmy Arena
4:10 pm	Aliyah Dunn 41/45 (91%); Tiana Metuarau 11/14 (79%)	Report; Stats	Ellie Bird 28/31 (90%); Kate Beveridge 8/10 (80%); Brooke Leaver 4/7 (57%)

Mon 11 Mar	Southern Steel	73–53	Waikato Bay of Plenty Magic	Stadium Southland
7:40 pm	Lenize Potgieter 39/43 (91%); Te Paea Selby-Rickit 17/25 (68%); Jennifer O'Connell 17/18 (94%)	Report; Stats	Abigail Latu-Meafou 24/30 (80%); Kelsey McPhee 18/20 (90%); Monica Falkner 11/13 (85%)

Wed 13 Mar	Northern Stars	55–49	Northern Mystics	Pulman Arena
7:40 pm	Maia Wilson 40/48 (83%); Ellen Halpenny 11/16 (69%); Charlee Hodges 4/6 (67%)	Report; Stats	Grace Nweke 27/33 (82%); Bailey Mes 10/17 (59%); Jamie Hume 8/17 (47%); Kristina Brice 4/6 (67%)

=== Round 4 ===
Sun 17 Mar	Northern Mystics	34–42	Waikato Bay of Plenty Magic	Eventfinda Stadium
4:10 pm	Grace Nweke 14/16 (88%); Bailey Mes 14/20 (70%); Jamie Hume 6/14 (43%)	Report; Stats	Abigail Latu-Meafou 18/24 (75%); Monica Falkner 17/23 (74%); Kelsey McPhee 7/8 (88%)

Sun 17 Mar	Southern Steel	70–52	Mainland Tactix	Stadium Southland
6:10 pm	Lenize Potgieter 45/51 (88%); Te Paea Selby-Rickit 25/30 (83%)	Report; Stats	Ellie Bird 35/37 (95%); Brooke Leaver 17/22 (77%)

Mon 18 Mar	Northern Stars	50–61	Central Pulse	Pulman Arena
7:40 pm	Maia Wilson 35/43 (81%); Ellen Halpenny 6/10 (60%); Charlee Hodges 9/12 (75%)	Report; Stats	Aliyah Dunn 43/45 (96%); Ameliaranne Ekenasio 17/25 (68%); Tiana Metuarau 1/2 (50%)

=== Round 5 ===
Sun 24 Mar	Mainland Tactix	52–48	Northern Mystics	Trafalgar Centre
4:10 pm	Ellie Bird 44/52 (85%); Kate Beveridge 4/6 (67%); Brooke Leaver 4/9 (44%)	Report; Stats	Grace Nweke 32/37 (86%); Bailey Mes 13/22 (59%); Jamie Hume 3/8 (38%)

Mon 25 Mar	Central Pulse	54–50	Southern Steel	TSB Bank Arena
7:40 pm	Ameliaranne Ekenasio 34/37 (92%); Aliyah Dunn 20/23 (87%); Tiana Metuarau 0/3 (0%)	Report; Stats	Lenize Potgieter 23/27 (85%); Te Paea Selby-Rickit 18/19 (95%); Jennifer O'Connell 9/11 (82%)

Wed 27 Mar	Waikato Bay of Plenty Magic	47–57	Northern Stars	Trustpower Arena
7:40 pm	Monica Falkner 23/28 (82%); Kelsey McPhee 19/25 (76%); Abigail Latu-Meafou 5/7 (71%)	Report; Stats	Maia Wilson 36/41 (88%); Ellen Halpenny 21/23 (91%)

=== Round 6 ===
The second Super Sunday event was hosted at The Trusts Arena. There were wins for Northern Stars, Central Pulse and Southern Steel.

Sun 31 Mar	Central Pulse	48–33	Mainland Tactix	The Trusts Arena
2:10 pm	Ameliaranne Ekenasio 21/26 (81%); Tiana Metuarau 15/20 (75%); Aliyah Dunn 12/12 (100%)	Report; Stats	Ellie Bird 21/22 (95%); Kate Beveridge 10/14 (71%); Brooke Leaver 2/6 (33%)

Sun 31 Mar	Northern Mystics	50–64	Northern Stars	The Trusts Arena
4:10 pm	Grace Nweke 31/42 (74%); Bailey Mes 15/27 (56%); Jamie Hume 4/5 (80%)	Report; Stats	Maia Wilson 42/54 (78%); Ellen Halpenny 12/15 (80%); Charlee Hodges 10/11 (91%)

Sun 31 Mar	Waikato Bay of Plenty Magic	46–59	Southern Steel	The Trusts Arena
6:10 pm	Kelsey McPhee 27/31 (87%); Monica Falkner 11/17 (65%); Abigail Latu-Meafou 8/12 (67%)	Report; Stats	Lenize Potgieter 33/41 (80%); Te Paea Selby-Rickit 21/28 (75%); Jennifer O'Connell 5/13 (38%)

Mon 1 Apr	Northern Mystics	54–44	Waikato Bay of Plenty Magic	The Trusts Arena
7:40 pm	Grace Nweke 33/38 (87%); Bailey Mes 18/22 (82%); Jamie Hume 3/12 (25%)	Report; Stats	Kelsey McPhee 26/35 (74%); Monica Falkner 18/23 (78%)

Wed 3 Apr	Central Pulse	68–42	Northern Stars	Te Rauparaha Arena
7:40 pm	Aliyah Dunn 38/41 (93%); Ameliaranne Ekenasio 30/34 (88%)	Report; Stats	Maia Wilson 29/36 (81%); Ellen Halpenny 10/12 (83%); Charlee Hodges 3/4 (75%)

=== Round 7 ===
Sun 7 Apr	Northern Mystics	64–54	Mainland Tactix	The Trusts Arena
4:10 pm	Grace Nweke 48/52 (92%); Bailey Mes 13/21 (62%); Jamie Hume 3/8 (38%)	Report; Stats	Ellie Bird 45/53 (85%); Kate Beveridge 9/11 (82%)

Mon 8 Apr	Northern Stars	42–53	Waikato Bay of Plenty Magic	Pulman Arena
7:40 pm	Maia Wilson 27/36 (75%); Charlee Hodges 13/16 (81%); Ellen Halpenny 2/5 (40%)	Report; Stats	Kelsey McPhee 38/45 (84%); Monica Falkner 15/16 (94%)

Wed 10 Apr	Southern Steel	50–66	Central Pulse	More FM Arena
7:40 pm	Lenize Potgieter 33/38 (87%); Te Paea Selby-Rickit 17/22 (77%)	Report; Stats	Aliyah Dunn 37/37 (100%); Ameliaranne Ekenasio 29/34 (85%)

=== Round 8 ===
Sun 14 Apr	Northern Stars	58–60	Southern Steel	Pulman Arena
4:10 pm	Maia Wilson 39/49 (80%); Charlee Hodges 19/24 (79%)	Report; Stats	Lenize Potgieter 22/24 (92%); Te Paea Selby-Rickit 21/27 (78%); Jennifer O'Connell 17/24 (71%)

Mon 15 Apr	Waikato Bay of Plenty Magic	57–50	Mainland Tactix	Claudelands Arena
7:40 pm	Kelsey McPhee 40/46 (87%); Monica Falkner 17/19 (89%)	Report; Stats	Ellie Bird 43/46 (93%); Kate Beveridge 5/10 (50%); Brooke Leaver 2/3 (67%)

Wed 17 Apr	Central Pulse	59–49	Northern Mystics	Te Rauparaha Arena
7:40 pm	Aliyah Dunn 43/47 (91%); Tiana Metuarau 9/11 (82%); Ameliaranne Ekenasio 7/9 (78%)	Report; Stats	Grace Nweke 24/30 (80%); Bailey Mes 20/25 (80%); Jamie Hume 5/5 (100%)

=== Round 9 ===
Sun 21 Apr	Central Pulse	54–33	Waikato Bay of Plenty Magic	TSB Bank Arena
4:10 pm	Aliyah Dunn 30/32 (94%); Ameliaranne Ekenasio 22/32 (69%); Tiana Metuarau 2/3 (67%)	Report; Stats	Monica Falkner 18/24 (75%); Kelsey McPhee 8/11 (73%); Abigail Latu-Meafou 4/7 (57%); Khiarna Williams 3/3 (100%)

Tue 23 Apr	Mainland Tactix	49–46	Northern Stars	Horncastle Arena
7:40 pm	Ellie Bird 37/43 (86%); Kate Beveridge 12/15 (80%)	Report; Stats	Maia Wilson 19/26 (73%); Ellen Halpenny 18/21 (86%); Charlee Hodges 9/13 (69%)

Wed 24 Apr	Southern Steel	66–60	Northern Mystics	More FM Arena
7:40 pm	Lenize Potgieter 49/56 (88%); Te Paea Selby-Rickit 17/22 (77%)	Report; Stats	Grace Nweke 40/45 (89%); Bailey Mes 16/21 (76%); Jamie Hume 4/8 (50%)

=== Round 10 ===
Sun 28 Apr	Northern Stars	53–52	Northern Mystics	Pulman Arena
4:10 pm	Maia Wilson 36/45 (80%); Ellen Halpenny 17/21 (81%)	Report; Stats	Grace Nweke 29/37 (78%); Bailey Mes 21/26 (81%); Jamie Hume 2/6 (33%)

Mon 29 Apr	Mainland Tactix	44–62	Central Pulse	Horncastle Arena
7:40 pm	Ellie Bird 39/42 (93%); Kate Beveridge 4/8 (50%); Brooke Leaver 1/1 (100%)	Report; Stats	Aliyah Dunn 36/38 (95%); Ameliaranne Ekenasio 26/31 (84%); Tiana Metuarau 0/1 (0%)

Wed 1 May	Waikato Bay of Plenty Magic	48–63	Southern Steel	Claudelands Arena
7:40 pm	Kelsey McPhee 28/38 (74%); Abigail Latu-Meafou 12/14 (86%); Monica Falkner 8/10 (80%)	Report; Stats	Lenize Potgieter 39/44 (89%); Te Paea Selby-Rickit 22/27 (81%); Georgia Heffernan 2/4 (50%)

=== Round 11 ===
The third Super Sunday was hosted at Stadium Southland. There were wins for Central Pulse, Southern Steel and Mainland Tactix.

Sun 5 May	Waikato Bay of Plenty Magic	45–53	Central Pulse	Stadium Southland
2:10 pm	Kelsey McPhee 28/38 (74%); Monica Falkner 17/20 (85%)	Report; Stats	Ameliaranne Ekenasio 28/37 (76%); Aliyah Dunn 20/24 (83%); Tiana Metuarau 5/7 (71%)

Sun 5 May	Southern Steel	69–58	Northern Mystics	Stadium Southland
4:10 pm	Lenize Potgieter 43/44 (98%); Te Paea Selby-Rickit 19/24 (79%); Jennifer O'Connell 5/9 (56%); Georgia Heffernan 2/4 (50%)	Report; Stats	Grace Nweke 31/39 (79%); Bailey Mes 20/22 (91%); Jamie Hume 7/8 (88%)

Sun 5 May	Mainland Tactix	53–48	Northern Stars	Stadium Southland
6:10 pm	Ellie Bird 47/53 (89%); Brooke Leaver 1/1 (100%); Kate Beveridge 1/3 (33%)	Report; Stats	Maia Wilson 37/43 (86%); Ellen Halpenny 11/17 (65%)

Mon 6 May	Southern Steel	62–52	Central Pulse	Stadium Southland
7:40 pm	Lenize Potgieter 45/47 (96%); Te Paea Selby-Rickit 17/21 (81%); Georgia Heffernan 0/3 (0%)	Report; Stats	Aliyah Dunn 32/34 (94%); Ameliaranne Ekenasio 20/26 (77%)

Wed 8 May	Northern Mystics	69–57	Mainland Tactix	The Trusts Arena
7:40 pm	Grace Nweke 56/69 (81%); Bailey Mes 13/17 (76%)	Report; Stats	Ellie Bird 48/50 (96%); Kate Beveridge 9/12 (75%); Brooke Leaver 0/1 (0%)

=== Round 12 ===
Sun 12 May	Waikato Bay of Plenty Magic	61–52	Northern Mystics	Claudelands Arena
4:10 pm	Kelsey McPhee 47/55 (85%); Monica Falkner 14/20 (70%); Abigail Latu-Meafou 0/1 (0%)	Report; Stats	Grace Nweke 37/49 (76%); Bailey Mes 15/19 (79%)

Mon 13 May	Central Pulse	68–42	Northern Stars	TSB Bank Arena
7:40 pm	Aliyah Dunn 28/34 (82%); Ameliaranne Ekenasio 33/37 (89%); Tiana Metuarau 7/9 (78%)	Report; Stats	Maia Wilson 32/40 (80%); Charlee Hodges 7/12 (58%); Ellen Halpenny 3/10 (30%)

Wed 15 May	Mainland Tactix	56–64	Southern Steel	Horncastle Arena
7:40 pm	Ellie Bird 45/56 (80%); Kate Beveridge 8/10 (80%); Brooke Leaver 3/5 (60%)	Report; Stats	Lenize Potgieter 44/48 (92%); Te Paea Selby-Rickit 20/21 (95%)

=== Round 13 ===
Sun 19 May	Mainland Tactix	60–48	Waikato Bay of Plenty Magic	Horncastle Arena
4:10 pm	Ellie Bird 42/46 (91%); Kate Beveridge 18/25 (72%)	Report; Stats	Kelsey McPhee 24/29 (83%); Monica Falkner 16/19 (84%); Abigail Latu-Meafou 8/12 (67%)

Mon 20 May	Northern Mystics	60–54	Central Pulse	The Trusts Arena
7:40 pm	Grace Nweke 47/58 (81%); Bailey Mes 13/19 (68%)	Report; Stats	Aliyah Dunn 39/44 (89%); Ameliaranne Ekenasio 9/17 (53%); Tiana Metuarau 6/9 (67%)

Wed 22 May	Southern Steel	63–46	Northern Stars	Stadium Southland
7:40 pm	Lenize Potgieter 28/32 (88%); Jennifer O'Connell 18/22 (82%); Te Paea Selby-Rickit 17/23 (74%)	Report; Stats	Maia Wilson 33/43 (77%); Charlee Hodges 12/16 (75%); Ellen Halpenny 1/2 (50%)

== Final ladder ==
2019 ANZ Premiership ladder
Pos	Team	P	W	L	GF	GA	GD	G%	BP	Pts
1	Central Pulse	15	13	2	856	676	180	126.6	0	39
2	Southern Steel	15	12	3	946	809	137	116.9	2	38
3	Northern Stars	15	6	9	785	840	-55	93.5	3	21
4	Waikato Bay of Plenty Magic	15	5	10	713	793	-80	89.9	0	15
5	Mainland Tactix	15	5	10	740	849	-109	87.2	0	15
6	Northern Mystics	15	4	11	786	859	-73	91.5	2	14

Qualified for Grand final
Qualified for Elimination final

== Finals Series ==
=== Elimination final ===
Wed 29 May; 7.40pm	Report; Stats	Southern Steel	53–56	Northern Stars	Stadium Southland	Sky Sport
Wed 29 May; 7.40pm	Report; Stats	Scoring by quarter: 15–14, 30–27, 41–43, 53–56			Stadium Southland	Sky Sport
Wed 29 May; 7.40pm	Report; Stats	Lenize Potgieter 39/42 (93%); Te Paea Selby-Rickit 11/18 (61%); Jennifer O'Connell 3/5 (60%)		Maia Wilson 43/45 (96%); Charlee Hodges 13/18 (72%)	Stadium Southland	Sky Sport

=== Grand final ===
Mon 3 Jun; 2.00pm	Central Pulse	52–48	Northern Stars	Te Rauparaha Arena	Sky Sport
Mon 3 Jun; 2.00pm	Scoring by quarter: 12–10, 27–25, 40–34, 52–48			Te Rauparaha Arena	Sky Sport
Mon 3 Jun; 2.00pm	Aliyah Dunn 40/43 (93%); Ameliaranne Ekenasio 12/19 (63%)		Maia Wilson 34/41 (83%); Charlee Hodges 14/20 (70%)	Te Rauparaha Arena	Sky Sport

== Award winners ==
=== New Zealand Netball Awards ===
Award	Winner	Team
ANZ Premiership Player of the Year	Gina Crampton	Southern Steel
ANZ Premiership Coach of the Year	Yvette McCausland-Durie	Central Pulse

=== Team of the season ===
Brendon Egan selected Stuff's team of the season.

Position	Player	Team
GS	Lenize Potgieter	Southern Steel
GA	Ameliaranne Ekenasio	Central Pulse
WA	Gina Crampton	Southern Steel
C	Claire Kersten	Central Pulse
WD	Karin Burger	Central Pulse
GD	Katrina Rore	Central Pulse
GK	Jane Watson	Mainland Tactix
Coach	Yvette McCausland-Durie	Central Pulse

== Season statistics ==
Best of each team

Goal Shooters (by %)
Pos.	Player	Team	Goals (%)
1	Aliyah Dunn	Central Pulse	521/565 (92%)
2	Lenize Potgieter	Southern Steel	596/662 (90%)
3	Ellie Bird	Mainland Tactix	579/644 (90%)
4	Maia Wilson	Northern Stars	619/743 (83%)
5	Grace Nweke	Northern Mystics	449/545 (82%)
6	Kelsey McPhee	Waikato Bay of Plenty Magic	319/395 (81%)

Defensive Rebounds
Pos.	Player	Team	D/Reb.
1	Te Huinga Reo Selby-Rickit	Southern Steel	37
2	Sulu Fitzpatrick	Central Pulse	35
3	Jane Watson	Mainland Tactix	30
4	Kelly Jury	Waikato Bay of Plenty Magic	27
5	Erena Mikaere	Northern Mystics	22
6	Leana de Bruin	Northern Stars	19

Intercepts
Pos.	Player	Team	Inter.
1	Karin Burger	Central Pulse	41
2	Jane Watson	Mainland Tactix	40
3	Kelly Jury	Waikato Bay of Plenty Magic	37
4	Erena Mikaere	Northern Mystics	35
5	Te Huinga Reo Selby-Rickit	Southern Steel	32
6	Storm Purvis	Northern Stars	24

Centre Pass Receives
Pos.	Player	Team	CPR
1	Whitney Souness	Central Pulse	370
2	Gina Crampton	Southern Steel	364
3	Mila Reuelu-Buchanan	Northern Stars	299
4	Bailey Mes	Northern Mystics	276
5	Samon Nathan	Mainland Tactix	263
6	Simmon Howe	Waikato Bay of Plenty Magic	220

Deflections
Pos.	Player	Team	Def
1	Leana de Bruin	Northern Stars	99
2	Jane Watson	Mainland Tactix	96
3=	Kelly Jury	Waikato Bay of Plenty Magic	79
3=	Karin Burger	Central Pulse	79
4	Erena Mikaere	Northern Mystics	68
5	Abby Erwood	Southern Steel	52
