= Yvette McCausland-Durie =

New Zealand netball player and coach

Personal information
- Full name: Yvette McCausland-Durie
- Born: c. 1973 (age 52–53) Whangārei
- Occupation: Schoolteacher
- School: Rangitoto College
- University: Massey University

Netball career
- Playing position: WD
Years	Club team	Apps
Years	National team	Caps
1992	New Zealand U21	
Coaching career
- Years: Team
- 2004–2005: Western Flyers
- 2005–2013: Tū Toa
- 2006–2009: New Zealand U21
- 2009–2011: Central Pulse
- 2016: Central Zone
- 2017–2020: Central Pulse
- 2019: New Zealand U21
- 2021–2023: Central Pulse
- 2025: New Zealand
Medal record
Representing New Zealand
World Youth Netball Championships
Gold medal – first place	1992 Fiji	Team

Yvette McCausland-Durie is a New Zealand netball coach and former netball player. As a player, she played for Western Flyers during the National Bank Cup era and represented New Zealand at under-21 level. She was a member of the New Zealand team that won the 1992 World Youth Netball Championships. As a head coach, McCausland-Durie guided Central Pulse to the 2019 and 2020 ANZ Premierships and the 2018 Super Club title. She has also worked with the senior New Zealand team as an assistant coach and interim head coach and with the under-21 team as a head coach. She was head coach when New Zealand won gold at the 2009 World Youth Netball Championships. In September 2025, McCausland-Durie was appointed as the interim head coach for the senior team after Noeline Taurua was stood down by Netball New Zealand. McCausland-Durie is also a schoolteacher and educator. Together with her husband, she is a co-founder of the Manukura School based in Palmerston North.

== Early life, family and education ==
McCausland-Durie is a Māori with Ngāti Awa and Ngāpuhi affiliations. She was born in Whangārei and attended schools in Tangiteroria and Dargaville before moving to Rangitoto College for Year 13. She is married to Nathan Durie, a school teacher and rugby union coach, and has two children: Te Ahikaiata (born c.2001) and Atareta (born c.2004). The McCausland-Durie family are based in Palmerston North. Nathan Durie is a nephew of Sir Mason Durie.

== Playing career ==
=== Club netball ===
McCausland-Durie played club netball for Collegiate (Auckland), Verdettes (Hamilton) and Feilding (Feilding). Her coaches included, among others, Margaret Forsyth and Leigh Gibbs. During the National Bank Cup era she played for Western Flyers. Her teammates at Feilding and Western Flyers included her future coaching partner, Janine Southby.

=== New Zealand ===
McCausland-Durie represented New Zealand at under-21 level. She was a member of the New Zealand team that won the 1992 World Youth Netball Championships.

== Coaching career ==
=== Western Flyers ===
Between 2004 and 2005, during the National Bank Cup era, McCausland-Durie served as head coach of Western Flyers.

=== Central Pulse ===
McCausland-Durie first served as Central Pulse head coach between 2009 and 2011. The highlight of her first spell as Pulse head coach, was ending their 24-game losing streak when they won their first ever match, defeating 2008 ANZ Championship winners, New South Wales Swifts, 53–52 in a 2009 Round 13 match at the Te Rauparaha Arena.

In 2016 McCausland-Durie served as head coach of Central Pulse's reserve team, Central Zone, in the Beko Netball League, guiding them to grand final. Then between 2017 and 2020, she again served as Central Pulse head coach. With a team captained by Katrina Rore and featuring, among others, Karin Burger, Ameliaranne Ekenasio and Claire Kersten, she guided Pulse to four successive grand finals. Between 2018 and 2020, Pulse won three successive minor premierships and in both 2019 and 2020 they were overall champions. They also won the 2018 Netball New Zealand Super Club tournament. In 2019, McCausland-Durie was named ANZ Premiership Coach of the Year. After four seasons in charge of Pulse, in July 2020, McCausland-Durie announced she was stepping down as head coach.

Ahead of the 2022 season, McCausland-Durie was appointed Central Pulse head coach for a third time.

=== New Zealand ===
McCausland-Durie has worked with the senior New Zealand national netball team as an assistant coach and with the under-21 team as a head coach. She was an assistant coach to the under-21 team which won gold at the 2005 World Youth Netball Championships. Between 2006 and 2009 she served as the under-21 head coach and guided them to the 2009 title. Janine Southby was her assistant coach. In May 2016, after Southby was appointed head coach of the senior team, she recruited McCausland-Durie as her assistant coach. McCausland-Durie subsequently served as New Zealand assistant coach between 2016 and 2018, including at the 2018 Commonwealth Games. In 2019 she was re-appointed head coach of the New Zealand under-21 team.

In September 2025, McCausland-Durie was appointed as the interim head coach for the senior team after Noeline Taurua was stood down by Netball New Zealand.

Tournaments	Place
2024 Fast5 Netball World Series	2nd
2025 Taini Jamison Trophy Series	1st
2025 Constellation Cup	2nd
2025 New Zealand netball tour of Great Britain	

== Teacher and educator ==
McCausland-Durie is a schoolteacher and educator. She has a Post Graduate Diploma in Sport Management, a Bachelor of Education (Physical Education) and a Diploma of teaching. McCausland-Durie is a co-founder of the Manukura School based in Palmerston North. She is also a member of its board of trustees. She previously taught in Auckland and at Palmerston North Girls' High School. In 2005 herself and her husband, Nathan Durie, formed Tū Toa Academy, a sports academy based in Palmerston North specialising in Māori students. In 2008 she graduated from Massey University with a Master of Education. She wrote her thesis on Māori netball player retention issues. In 2009 she guided Tū Toa to the New Zealand Secondary Schools Netball title. In 2013, following some restructuring, Tū Toa was relaunched as the Manukura School.

== Honours ==
=== Player ===
New Zealand

- World Youth Netball Championships
  - Winners: 1992

=== Head coach ===
Central Pulse

- ANZ Premiership
  - Winners: 2019, 2020, 2022
  - Runners Up: 2017
  - Minor premiers: 2018, 2019, 2020, 2022
- Netball New Zealand Super Club
  - Winners: 2018

New Zealand

- World Youth Netball Championships
  - Winners: 2009
- Taini Jamison Trophy
  - Winners: 2025

Individual Awards

Year	Award
2007	Māori Sports Coach of the Year
2019	ANZ Premiership Coach of the Year
2020	ANZ Premiership Coach of the Year
2022	ANZ Premiership Coach of the Year
