= 'Api Taufa =

New Zealand netball player

- Citizenship: New Zealand
- Occupation: Netball player

'Api Taufa is a Tongan New Zealander netball player who has represented Tonga internationally. She plays for the Central Manawa. She is the sister of netballer Salote Taufa.

== Education ==
Taufa was educated at Newlands College. In 2016, she was part of the championship-winning Wellington under-19 tournament team. She was then selected for the New Zealand under-19 netball team. In November 2016, she was selected as a trialist for the New Zealand Under-21 netball team.

== Career ==
In 2016, she was selected for the Central Manawa. In 2020, she ruptured her Achilles tendon. In February 2022, she was selected for the Central Manawa for the 2022 season. Later that year, she was selected for the Tonga national netball team for the 2023 Netball World Cup Oceania qualifiers.
