= Karin Burger =

New Zealand netball international

Personal information
- Born: 12 April 1993 (age 33) Cape Town, South Africa
- Height: 1.84 m (6 ft 0 in)

Netball career
- Playing positions: GK, GD, WD
Years	Club team	Apps
2011–2016	Naenae Collegians United	
2016–2017	Central Manawa	
2017–2020	Central Pulse	56
2021–2025	Mainland Tactix	
2026–	Sunshine Coast Lightning	
Years	National team	Caps
2018–	New Zealand	73
Medal record
Netball
Representing New Zealand
Commonwealth Games
Gold medal – first place	2026 Glasgow	Team
Netball World Cup
Gold medal – first place	2019 Liverpool	Team
Fast5 World Series
Gold medal – first place	2018 Melbourne	Team

Karin Burger (born 12 April 1993) is a New Zealand netball international who plays for Sunshine Coast Lightning in the Super Netball. She was a member of the New Zealand teams that won the 2026 Commonwealth Games and 2019 Netball World Cup. After captaining New Zealand for the first test of the 2025 Taini Jamison Trophy Series, she was given the job permanently for the 2025 Constellation Cup and 2025 New Zealand netball tour of Great Britain. Burger was a member of the Pulse teams that won 2019 and 2020 ANZ Premiership titles and of the Tactix team that won the 2025 ANZ Premiership title. While playing for Tactix, she was named 2021 ANZ Premiership Player of the Year.

== Early life and family ==
Burger was born and raised in South Africa. Her family home is in Vredendal, Western Cape. She is daughter of Alma and Gerrit Burger. She has a sister, Almarie, and a brother Gerrit Junior. Burger started playing netball aged 6. In her youth, she greatly admired Irene van Dyk and Leana de Bruin. At aged 18, she made the decision to move to Wellington, New Zealand to pursue a netball career.

== Club career ==
=== Naenae Collegians United ===
Burger began her New Zealand netball career with Naenae Collegians United in Lower Hutt. She played for NNCU in Hutt Valley club netball competitions. While playing for Central Pulse, Burger continued to coach and mentor at NNCU.

=== Central Zone ===
In 2016 and 2017, Burger played for Central Zone in the Beko Netball League. Her team mates included Tiana Metuarau and Kimiora Poi. In 2016 she was a member of the Central Zone team that finished the season as runners up to Netball South. She was subsequently named the 2016 Beko Netball League Player of the Year. In 2017 she was a member of the Central Zone team that won the title. In the grand final they defeated Hellers Netball Mainland 43–41 and Burger was named player of the match.

=== Central Pulse ===
Between 2017 and 2020, Burger played for Central Pulse in the ANZ Premiership. After impressing in the Beko Netball League, Burger was invited by Yvette McCausland-Durie to join the Pulse squad for 2017. However, her court time was limited in her first season with Katrina Grant being the first chose goal defender. She switched to wing defence for 2018 and went on to establish herself as a regular member of the team. She was subsequently a member of the Pulse teams that won 2019 and 2020 titles. Along the way, between 2018 and 2019, Burger played in three successive grand finals for Pulse.

=== Mainland Tactix ===
In September 2020, Burger switched from Central Pulse to Mainland Tactix. The move to Tactix gave her the opportunity to play at goal defence and to partner with her New Zealand team mate, Jane Watson. She subsequently enjoyed a stand out season and was named the 2021 ANZ Premiership Player of the Year. On 7 May 2023, she made her 100th senior league appearance in a Round 10 match against Northern Stars.

=== Sunshine Coast Lightning ===
Burger was recruited to play for the 2026 Suncorp Super Netball season.. In August 2026 it was announced that Burger was contracted to the Sunshine Coast Lightning for 2027 also.

== International career ==
Burger made her senior debut for New Zealand on 15 September 2018 against England during the September 2018 Netball Quad Series. It was a debut that was memorable for the wrong reasons, as she was sent off the court. She was a prominent member of the New Zealand team that won the 2019 Netball World Cup. She was also a member of the New Zealand team that won the 2021 Constellation Cup. Burger had to pull out of trials for the 2022 Commonwealth Games due to a navicular fracture in her foot. After captaining New Zealand for the first test of the 2025 Taini Jamison Trophy Series, she given the job permanently for the 2025 Constellation Cup and 2025 New Zealand netball tour of Great Britain. Burger was named in the squad as the Captain for the 2026 Commonwealth Games, where the Silver Ferns won their first Commonwealth Games gold medal in 16 years, defeating Jamaica in the final.

Tournaments	Place
2018 Netball Quad Series (September)	3rd
2018 Fast5 Netball World Series	1st place, gold medalist(s)
2019 Netball Quad Series	3rd
2019 Netball World Cup	1st place, gold medalist(s)
2019 Constellation Cup	2nd place, silver medalist(s)
2020 Netball Nations Cup	1st place, gold medalist(s)
2020 Taini Jamison Trophy Series	1st place, gold medalist(s)
2021 Constellation Cup	1st place, gold medalist(s)
2021 Taini Jamison Trophy Series	2nd
2022 Netball Quad Series	3rd
2023 Netball Quad Series	2nd place, silver medalist(s)
2023 Netball World Cup	4th
2023 Taini Jamison Trophy Series	1st
2023 Constellation Cup	2nd
2024 Netball Nations Cup	3rd
2024 Taini Jamison Trophy Series	2nd
2024 Constellation Cup	1st
2025 Taini Jamison Trophy Series	1st
2025 Constellation Cup	2nd
2025 New Zealand netball tour of Great Britain	
2026 Commonwealth Games	1st

== Statistics ==
=== Grand finals ===
	Grand finals	Team	Place	Opponent
1	2018	Central Pulse	Runners up	Southern Steel
2	2019	Central Pulse	Winners	Northern Stars
3	2020	Central Pulse	Winners	Mainland Tactix
4	2021	Mainland Tactix	Runners up	Northern Mystics

=== ANZ Premiership ===
Season	Team	G/A	GA	RB	CPR	FD	IC	DF	PN	TO	MP
2017	Pulse	0/0	?	4	?	?	5	7	27	3	10
2018	Pulse	0/0	?	1	?	?	28	37	172	25	16
2019	Pulse	0/0	?	2	?	?	41	79	149	27	16
2020	Pulse	0/0	?	0	?	?	22	37	123	21	14
2021	Tactix	0/0	?	27	142	?	48	69	189	29	17
2022	Tactix	0/0									
Career											

== Honours ==
=== New Zealand ===
- Commonwealth Games: 2026
- Netball World Cup: 2019
- Constellation Cup: 2021, 2024
- Netball Nations Cup: 2020
- Taini Jamison Trophy: 2020, 2023, 2025
- Fast5 Netball World Series: 2018

=== Central Pulse ===
- ANZ Premiership: 2019, 2020, Runners up: 2017, 2018
- Netball New Zealand Super Club: 2018

=== Mainland Tactix ===
- ANZ Premiership: 2025 Runners up: 2021

=== Central Zone ===
- Beko Netball League: 2010, Runners up: 2016

== Individual honours ==
Year	Award
2016	Beko Netball League Player of the Year
2021	ANZ Premiership Player of the Year
2021	Fan Favourite
