= Ellen Halpenny =

New Zealand netball international

Personal information
- Born: 25 July 1990 (age 36) Napier, New Zealand
- Occupation: Police officer
- Height: 1.85 m (6 ft 1 in)
- School: Villa Maria College; Royal New Zealand Police College

Netball career
- Playing positions: GA, GS
Years	Club team	Apps
2008–2012	Canterbury Tactix	
2010–2011	→ Canterbury NPC	
2011	→ Lincoln University	
2013–2016	Waikato Bay of Plenty Magic	
2013	→ Hearts	
2017	Scottish Sirens	
2018–2019	Northern Stars	25
2020	Southern Steel	7
2022	Saints	
Years	National team	Caps
2014–2015	New Zealand	7
Medal record
Representing New Zealand
Fast5 Netball World Series
Gold medal – first place	2010 Liverpool	Team
Gold medal – first place	2014 Auckland	Team
Commonwealth Games
Silver medal – second place	2014 Glasgow	Team

Ellen Halpenny (born 25 July 1990) is a former New Zealand netball international. She was a member of the New Zealand team that were silver medalists at the 2014 Commonwealth Games. During the ANZ Championship era, Halpenny played for Canterbury Tactix and Waikato Bay of Plenty Magic. She subsequently played for Scottish Sirens during the 2017 Netball Superleague season. During the ANZ Premiership era, she played for Northern Stars and Southern Steel.

== Early life, family and education ==
Halpenny is the daughter of Kerry and Mike Halpenny. She was born in Napier but moved to the South Island with her parents and brother, Patrick, when she was 10. She attended Villa Maria College, Christchurch. In 2008, Halpenny was a prominent member of the Villa Maria team that won the South Island secondary schools netball tournament. In the final at the Edgar Centre, they defeated St Kevin's College, Oamaru 39–28, with Halpenny scoring 24 from 25.

== Playing career ==
=== Canterbury Tactix ===
Between 2008 and 2012, Halpenny played for Canterbury Tactix. At the age of 14, Halpenny, along with Julianna Naoupu, was drafted by Margaret Foster into the Canterbury Flames training squad. She was still attending Villa Maria when she was first included in Canterbury Tactix squads. She spent much of the 2008 and 2009 seasons on the Tactix bench, before establishing herself as a regular in 2010. While playing for Tactix, Halpenny also represented Canterbury in the national provincial netball championship, helping them win titles in 2010 and 2011.

=== Waikato Bay of Plenty Magic ===
Between 2013 and 2016, Halpenny played for Waikato Bay of Plenty Magic. She signed for Magic ahead of the 2013 season. She subsequently partnered Irene van Dyk, played in her first ANZ Championship play off and became an established member of the team. After an impressive 2014 season for Magic, Halpenny was included in the New Zealand team for the Commonwealth Games. In 2015 and 2016, she was a member of the Magic teams that won the New Zealand Conference titles.

=== Scottish Sirens ===
Ahead of the 2017 season, Halpenny signed for Scottish Sirens of the Netball Superleague. Together with Carla Borrego, Althea Byfield, Claire Brownie and Caroline O'Hanlon, she became a member of the inaugural Sirens squad.

=== Northern Stars ===
In 2018 and 2019, Halpenny played for Northern Stars. She was a member of the Stars team that reached the 2019 ANZ Premiership grand final. However, in the grand final, they lost 52–48 to Central Pulse, finishing the season in second place overall. Together with Leana de Bruin and Temepara Bailey, she subsequently announced her retirement from senior netball.

=== Southern Steel ===
During the 2020 season, Halpenny came out of retirement and joined Southern Steel as a temporary replacement player, after Steel lost two of their three attacking players to injury.

=== Christchurch Netball Centre ===
Throughout her senior netball career, Halpenny also played in local competitions organised by Christchurch's Netball Centre. In 2011 she was a member of the Lincoln University team that won the Premier Championship title. Her team mates included Anna Galvan and Jane Watson. In 2013, while also playing for Waikato-Bay of Plenty Magic, she played for Hearts. In 2022, Halpenny played for Saints.

=== International ===
==== New Zealand ====
In 2014 and 2015, Halpenny made 7 senior appearances for New Zealand. Between 2007 and 2011 she was a member of the New Zealand under-21 squad. She was also a member of the New Zealand team that won the gold medal at the 2010 World Netball Series. In June 2014, she was the only new cap named in the New Zealand squad for the 2014 Commonwealth Games. She subsequently made her senior debut for New Zealand on 26 July 2014 against Scotland and helped the Silver Ferns claim the silver medal. In November 2014, Halpenny was a member of the New Zealand team that won the gold medal at the 2014 Fast5 Netball World Series. In the final against Australia, during the second quarter, she scored with a huge shot, worth three points, from 10 metres on the buzzer. In January 2015, Halpenny was a member of the New Zealand team that won the Oceania Netball Series, playing in matches against Fiji and Samoa.

Tournament/Series	Place
2010 World Netball Series	2nd place, silver medalist(s)
2014 Commonwealth Games	2nd place, silver medalist(s)
2014 Fast5 Netball World Series	1st place, gold medalist(s)
2015 Oceania Netball Series	1st

==== Northern Ireland ====
Ahead of the 2019 Netball World Cup, Northern Ireland attempted to draft Halpenny. Under international netball eligibility rules, Halpenny could have declared for Northern Ireland. She was willing to represent them but work commitments prevented it happening.

== Police officer ==
In December 2019, Halpenny graduated from the Royal New Zealand Police College. While playing for Southern Steel, Halpenny also served as a full-time New Zealand Police officer, based out of Tokoroa.

== Statistics ==
ANZ Premiership statistics

Season	Team	G/A	GA	RB	CPR	FD	IC	DF	PN	TO	MP
2018	Stars	60/86 (70%)	?	6	58	?	1	3	22	27	11
2019	Stars	150/200 (75%)	112	11	118	155	0	2	33	59	14
2020	Steel	114/142 (80%)	20	13	0	25	1	0	8	23	7
Career											

== Honours ==
New Zealand

- Commonwealth Games
  - Runners Up: 2014
- Fast5 Netball World Series
  - Winners: 2010, 2014

Waikato Bay of Plenty Magic

- ANZ Championship – New Zealand Conference
  - Winners: 2015, 2016

Northern Stars

- ANZ Premiership
  - Runners Up: 2019
