= Tiana Metuarau =

New Zealand netball international

Personal information
- Full name: Tiana Metuarau
- Born: 15 January 2001 (age 25) Stevenage, Hertfordshire, England
- Height: 1.83 m (6 ft 0 in)
- Relative: Waimarama Taumaunu (mother)
- School: Wellington East Girls' College

Netball career
- Playing positions: GA, GS, WA
Years	Club team	Apps
2016–2017	Central Zone	
2016–2020	Central Pulse	59
2020–2021	Southern Steel	16
2021–	Central Pulse	
Years	National team	Caps
2021–	New Zealand	10
Medal record
Representing New Zealand
Netball World Youth Cup
Gold medal – first place	2017 Gaborone	Team
Fast5 World Series
Bronze medal – third place	2022 Christchurch	Team

Tiana Metuarau (born 15 January 2001) is a New Zealand netball international. Between 2017 and 2020, she was a prominent member of the Central Pulse team that won the 2018 Super Club title and the 2019 and 2020 ANZ Premiership titles. In 2022, Metuarau was co-captain of the Pulse team that won a third ANZ Premiership title.

== Early life, family and education ==
Metuarau is the daughter of Waimarama Taumaunu and George Metuarau. She has two siblings, Tuakana and Tanara. Her mother, Waimarama, is a former New Zealand netball international, former national team captain and head coach and Central Pulse's director of high performance. George Metuarau is a former rugby union player and coach. Between 2004 and 2011, he served as head coach of the Cook Islands national rugby sevens team. Between 2017 and 2019 he was a member of the Central Zone/Central Manawa coaching staff with responsibility for primary care.

Metuarau was born in Stevenage, Hertfordshire, England in 2001. At the time, her mother was serving as National Performance Director of the All England Netball Association. She is of Cook Island, Tahitian and Māori/Ngāti Porou descent. Her family returned to New Zealand when she was three years old. She attended Wellington East Girls' College.

== Playing career ==
=== Central Zone ===
In 2016 and 2017, Metuarau played for Central Zone in the Beko Netball League. Her teammates included Karin Burger and Kimiora Poi. In 2016 she was a member of the Central Zone team that finished the season as runners up to Netball South. In the final, aged just 15, she scored 24 from 26. In 2017 she was a member of the Central Zone team that won the title.

=== Central Pulse ===
2016–2020

Ahead of the 2017 ANZ Premiership season, Metuarau was included in the Central Pulse squad as a replacement for the pregnant Ameliaranne Ekenasio. Between 2017 and 2020 she was a prominent member of the Central Pulse team that won the 2018 Super Club title and the 2019 and 2020 ANZ Premiership titles. During this time, Metuarau played in four ANZ Premiership grand finals for Pulse. On 5 July 2020, during a 2020 Round 4 51–30 win over Waikato Bay of Plenty Magic, Metuarau, aged 19, made her 50th ANZ Premiership appearance for Pulse.

2021–2025

After spending the 2021 ANZ Premiership season playing for Southern Steel, Metuarau rejoined Central Pulse for the 2022 season. She was subsequently appointed Pulse co-captain along with Kelly Jury. In 2022, Metuarau was part of the Pulse team that won a third ANZ Premiership title.

=== Southern Steel ===
Ahead of the 2021 ANZ Premiership season, Metuarau signed for Southern Steel. She made 16 appearances for Steel, scoring 221 goals with an 81% success rate. It was after her successful season with Steel that Metuarau was called up for the senior 2021–22 New Zealand squad. Metuarau played just one season for Steel before rejoining Central Pulse.

=== New Zealand ===
Metuarau represented New Zealand at schoolgirl level. She was just 16 when she a member of the New Zealand under-21 team that won the 2017 Netball World Youth Cup. She played the first half in the 60–57 win in the final over Australia. Metuarau was included in the senior 2021–22 New Zealand squad. She subsequently made her senior debut for New Zealand on 20 September 2021 against England during the first test of the 2021 Taini Jamison Trophy Series, scoring 17 from 19 as she partnered Maia Wilson. She was also named player of the match.

Tournaments	Place
2017 Netball World Youth Cup	1st place, gold medalist(s)
2021 Taini Jamison Trophy Series	2nd
2022 Netball Quad Series	3rd place, bronze medalist(s)
2022 Fast5 Netball World Series	3rd place, bronze medalist(s)
2023 Netball World Cup	4th
2023 Taini Jamison Trophy Series	1st
2023 Constellation Cup	2nd
2023 Fast5 Netball World Series	2nd

== Statistics ==
=== Grand finals ===
	Grand finals	Team	Place	Opponent	Goals (%)
1	2017	Central Pulse	Runners up	Southern Steel	27/30 (90%)
2	2018	Central Pulse	Runners up	Southern Steel	4/4 (100%)
3	2019	Central Pulse	Winners	Northern Stars	
4	2020	Central Pulse	Winners	Mainland Tactix	
5	2022	Central Pulse	Winners	Northern Stars	11/13 (85%)

=== ANZ Premiership ===
Season	Team	G/A	GA	RB	CPR	FD	IC	DF	PN	TO	MP
2017	Pulse	351/437 (80%)	?	22	212	?	5	14	81	71	17
2018	Pulse	185/219 (84%)	?	7	136	?	3	6	68	72	16
2019	Pulse	59/84 (70%)	90	2	38	108	1	2	45	43	13
2020	Pulse	44/68 (65%)	72	5	69	107	1	3	45	34	13
2021	Steel	221/273 (81%)	252	24	321	366	5	20	85	101	16
2022	Pulse	250/306 (82%)	209	14	218	270	5	26	92	83	16
2023	Pulse	Goals scored									
Career											

== Honours ==
New Zealand

- Netball World Youth Cup
  - Winners: 2017
- Taini Jamison Trophy
  - Winners: 2023

Central Pulse

- ANZ Premiership
  - Winners: 2019, 2020, 2022
  - Runners Up: 2017
  - Minor premiers: 2018, 2019, 2020, 2022
- Netball New Zealand Super Club
  - Winners: 2018

Central Zone

- National Netball League
  - Winners: 2017
  - Runners Up: 2016
