= Ameliaranne Ekenasio =

New Zealand netball international

Personal information
- Full name: Ameliaranne Ekenasio (Née: Wells)
- Born: 11 January 1991 (age 35) Bundaberg, Queensland
- Height: 1.86 m (6 ft 1 in)

Netball career
- Playing positions: GA, GS
Years	Club team	Apps
2010–2014	Queensland Fusion	
2011–2014	Queensland Firebirds	
2015–2020	Central Pulse	
2022–	Waikato Bay of Plenty Magic	
Years	National team	Caps
2010–2011	Australia U-19, U-21	
2014–	New Zealand	53
Medal record
Representing New Zealand
Netball World Cup
Gold medal – first place	2019 Liverpool	Team
Fast5 Netball World Series
Gold medal – first place	2018 Melbourne	Team

Ameliaranne Ekenasio (born 11 January 1991), previously known as Ameliaranne Wells, is a New Zealand netball international. In 2010 and 2011, Wells represented Australia at under-19 and under-21 levels. In 2014 she switched allegiances to New Zealand. She represented New Zealand at the 2018 Commonwealth Games and was a prominent member of the New Zealand team that won the 2019 Netball World Cup. She captained New Zealand when they won the 2021 Constellation Cup.

Between 2011 and 2014, Wells played for Queensland Firebirds in the ANZ Championship. Between 2015 and 2020, Ekenasio played for Central Pulse. She was a prominent member of the Pulse teams that won the 2018 Netball New Zealand Super Club and the 2019 and 2020 ANZ Premierships. Since 2022, Ekenasio has played for Waikato Bay of Plenty Magic in the ANZ Premiership.

== Early life and family ==
Wells is a Māori Australian with Ngāti Kahu and Ngāpuhi affiliations. She was born in Bundaberg, Queensland. She is the daughter of Anthony and Denese Wells. Her father was born in New Zealand. Her mother died in December 2015, following a terminal illness. She has an older sister, Haldaana, and younger brother, Jordan. In December 2015, Wells met Damien Ekenasio, a basketballer who played for Wellington Saints. Within three weeks the couple were engaged. In August 2016 they were married. In June 2017 she gave birth to a son, Ocean. In November 2021, she gave birth to a daughter, Luna.

== Playing career ==
=== Early years ===
Wells started playing netball at 13 for her school and then for Across The Waves. In 2007 and 2008 she was a member of ATW Gold teams that won Bundaberg Netball Association first division premiership titles. She was later selected to join the Ergon Energy Netball Academy. She also played for Wide Bay Thundercats, Brisbane South Wildcats and Yellow Cab Lions in Queensland state netball leagues. Wells' mother served as manager of Thundercats. In 2009 she was a member of the Wildcats team that were won the Queensland state league title, defeating Kedron Wavell Cougars in the final. Wells was named player of the final.

=== Queensland ===
Wells represented Queensland at under-17, under-19 and under-21 levels in the Australian National Netball Championships. In 2010 she was a member of the Queensland team that won the under-19 tournament, defeating New South Wales in the final. She shot 17 from 19 in the semi-final victory against Victoria and averaged close to 90% accuracy throughout the tournament. Her shooting partner was Stephanie Wood.

=== Queensland Fusion ===
Between 2010 and 2014, Wells played for Queensland Fusion in the Australian Netball League. She helped Fusion finish as ANL runners up in 2014.

=== Queensland Firebirds ===
Between 2011 and 2014, Wells played for Queensland Firebirds in the ANZ Championship. She was a fringe member of the 2011 Queensland Firebirds team won the ANZ Championship. Laura Geitz compared Wells to Maria Tutaia. However, she found herself behind Romelda Aiken, Natalie Medhurst and Amorette Wild. At the end of the 2014 season, Wells was on the verge of giving up netball and travelling overseas. However she was subsequently offered a contract to play for Central Pulse.

=== Central Pulse ===
Between 2015 and 2020, Ekenasio played for Central Pulse. After missing the 2017 season due to pregnancy, she returned in 2018 and competed with Aliyah Dunn and Tiana Metuarau for a place in the team. Ekenasio was subsequently a member of the 2018 Central Pulse team that were minor premiers. She also help Pulse win the 2018 Netball New Zealand Super Club. She was a prominent member of the Pulse teams that won the 2019 and 2020 ANZ Premierships. Between 2018 and 2020, Ekenasio played and scored in three grand finals for Pulse. Ekenasio was initially named as captain of the 2021 Central Pulse team. However she subsequently missed the entire season. She was rested for the Otaki tournament, then went on medical leave due to fatigue and then became pregnant. In August 2021 it was announced that Ekenasio would not be returning to play for Pulse.

=== Waikato Bay of Plenty Magic ===
Ahead of the 2022 season, Ekenasio signed for Waikato Bay of Plenty Magic. On 20 March 2022, she made her debut for Magic against Central Pulse, playing the opening quarter of a Round 2 match. Ahead of the 2023 season, Ekenasio was named as Magic captain.

=== International ===
==== Australia ====
Wells represented Australia at under-19 and under-21 levels. In 2010 she was a member of the Australia U19s team that won a Tri-Nation series against representative sides from New Zealand and England. Wells achieved an overall accuracy rate of 93% in the tournament and a 97% accuracy rate in the opening game against New Zealand. In 2011 she play for Australia U21s against New Zealand in a three-match series.

==== New Zealand ====
In September 2014, after signing for Central Pulse, Wells was included in New Zealand squads. On 8 October 2014, Wells made her senior debut for New Zealand against Australia during the second test of the 2014 Constellation Cup. Ekenasio represented New Zealand at the 2018 Commonwealth Games. She was also a member of the New Zealand team that won the 2018 Fast5 Netball World Series. She was a prominent member of the New Zealand team that won the 2019 Netball World Cup. Ekenasio scored 24 from 26 at 92% in the gold medal match. She was subsequently named the 2019 Silver Ferns Player of the Year.

Ahead of the 2020 Netball Nations Cup, Ekenasio was named New Zealand captain. She captained New Zealand when they won the 2021 Constellation Cup. After not playing international netball for 18 months due to pregnancy, Ekenasio was recalled to the New Zealand team for the 2022 Taini Jamison Trophy Series. She was also elected captain by her team mates and coaches.

Tournaments	Place	Goals (%)
2014 Constellation Cup	2nd place, silver medalist(s)	21/28 (75%)
2014 Taini Jamison Trophy Series	1st	7/13 (54%)
2015 Constellation Cup	2nd place, silver medalist(s)	2/2 (100%)
2016 Netball Quad Series	2nd place, silver medalist(s)	90/108 (83%)
2016 Taini Jamison Trophy Series	1st	38/48 (79%)
2016 Constellation Cup	2nd place, silver medalist(s)	16/18 (89%)
2017 Fast5 Netball World Series	4th	
2018 Taini Jamison Trophy Series	2nd	87/110 (79%)
2018 Commonwealth Games	4th	39/54 (72%)
2018 Netball Quad Series (September)	3rd place, bronze medalist(s)	10/18 (56%)
2018 Fast5 Netball World Series	1st place, gold medalist(s)	
2019 Netball Quad Series	3rd place, bronze medalist(s)	53/63 (84%)
2019 Netball World Cup	1st place, gold medalist(s)	162/183 (89%)
2019 Constellation Cup	2nd place, silver medalist(s)	85/94 (90%)
2020 Netball Nations Cup	1st place, gold medalist(s)	67/80 (84%)
2020 Taini Jamison Trophy Series	1st place, gold medalist(s)	57/62 (92%)
2021 Constellation Cup	1st place, gold medalist(s)	41/52 (79%)
2022 Taini Jamison Trophy Series	1st place, gold medalist(s)	23/24 (96%)
2022 Constellation Cup	2nd place, silver medalist(s)	51/60 (85%)
2023 Netball Quad Series	2nd place, silver medalist(s)	36/43 (84%)
2023 Netball World Cup	4th	
2023 Taini Jamison Trophy Series	1st	79/87 (91%)
2023 Constellation Cup	2nd	45/53 (85%)
2024 Taini Jamison Trophy Series	2nd	31/35 (89%)
2024 Constellation Cup	1st	55/64 (86%)

== Statistics ==
=== Grand finals ===
	Grand finals	Team	Place	Opponent	Goals (%)
1	2018	Central Pulse	Runners up	Southern Steel	17/25 (68%)
2	2019	Central Pulse	Winners	Northern Stars	12/19 (63%)
3	2020	Central Pulse	Winners	Mainland Tactix	15/18 (83%)

=== Individual stats ===
Season	Team	G/A	GA	RB	CPR	FD	IC	DF	PN	TO	MP
2011	Firebirds	3/6 (50%)	1	0	0	0	0	0	0	0	
2012	Firebirds										
2013	Firebirds	16/20 (80%)									4
2014	Firebirds										4
2015	Pulse	206/262 (79%)									
2016	Pulse										
2017 ^{2}	Pulse	0/0	0	0	0	0	0	0	0	0	0
2018	Pulse	194/250 (78%)	?	0	110	?	1	4	12	55	14
2019	Pulse	328/419 (78%)	158	7	198	215	3	7	24	92	15
2020	Pulse	251/288 (87%)	96	10	170	140	5	7	24	44	13
2021 ^{2}	Pulse	0/0	0	0	0	0	0	0	0	0	0
2022	Magic	258/303 (85%)	53	12	50	88	0	5	12	42	12
2023	Magic										
Career											

Notes

- ^1 Between 2011 and 2016, Wells made 36 ANZ Championship appearances for Queensland Firebirds and Central Pulse.
- ^2 Ekenasio missed the 2017 and 2021 seasons due to pregnancy.

== Honours ==
New Zealand

- Netball World Cup
  - Winners: 2019
- Constellation Cup
  - Winners: 2021, 2024
- Taini Jamison Trophy
  - Winners: 2014, 2016, 2020, 2022, 2023
- Netball Nations Cup
  - Winners: 2020
- Fast5 Netball World Series
  - Winners: 2018

Central Pulse

- ANZ Premiership
  - Winners: 2019, 2020,
  - Minor premiers: 2018, 2019, 2020
- Netball New Zealand Super Club
  - Winners: 2018

Queensland Fusion

- Australian Netball League
  - Runners up: 2014

Queensland Firebirds

- ANZ Championship
  - Winners: 2011

Queensland

- Australian National Netball Championships
  - Winners: Under-19 (2010)

Brisbane South Wildcats

- Queensland state netball league
  - Winners: 2009

Individual Awards

Year	Award
2019	Silver Ferns Player of the Year
