= Abigail Latu-Meafou =

New Zealand-born Australian netball player

Personal information
- Born: 5 July 1997 (age 29) Auckland, New Zealand
- Height: 1.83 m (6 ft 0 in)

Netball career
- Playing positions: GA, GS
Years	Club team	Apps
2017	Queensland Firebirds	
2018	Adelaide Thunderbirds	
2019–2024	Waikato Bay of Plenty Magic	
2025	Queensland Firebirds	

Abigail Latu-Meafou (born 5 July 1997) is a New Zealand-born Australian netball player in the Suncorp Super Netball, playing for the Queensland Firebirds. She previously played in the ANZ Premiership, playing for the Waikato Bay of Plenty Magic.

Latu-Meafou was born in Auckland, New Zealand though grew up playing netball in Ipswich, Australia. She made her debut in the Super Netball league in 2017 for the Queensland Firebirds as an injury-replacement player before being picked up on the starting list by the Adelaide Thunderbirds ahead of the 2018 season. Latu-Meafou stayed at the Thunderbirds until the end of the 2018 season, and then moved to New Zealand to play for the Waikato Bay of Plenty Magic.

After six years away from the club, Latu-Meafou returned to play for the Queensland Firebirds in Round 5 of the 2025 Suncorp Super Netball season. She played nine of the 14 regular-season games, missing the last game due to personal reasons.
