= Kristina Brice =

Australian netball player

Personal information
- Full name: Kristina Brice
- Born: 9 July 1994 (age 32) Baulkham Hills, New South Wales
- Height: 1.96 m (6 ft 5 in)
- University: Western Sydney University

Netball career
- Playing position: GS
Years	Club team	Apps
2015-16	Adelaide Thunderbirds	
2017–18	Giants Netball	
2019–20	Northern Mystics	

Kristina Brice is an Australian netball player in the ANZ Premiership, playing for the Northern Mystics.

Brice began her domestic league career as a training partner with the Adelaide Thunderbirds in 2015, impressing during her time on court and becoming an asset for the team. She was picked up by new team Giants Netball for the new Suncorp Super Netball league in 2017, and has remained at the club since then. Brice played at the Giants for two seasons, often as the third goal attack/shooter in the side. After the 2018 season she moved to New Zealand to play for the Northern Mystics in the ANZ Premiership competition.
