= National Netball League (New Zealand) =

Netball league in New Zealand

- Founded: 2016
- Owner: Netball New Zealand
- No. of teams: 6 (2022)
- Country: New Zealand
- Most recent champions: Mainland (1st title)
- Most titles: Central Zone/Central Manawa (5 titles)
- Broadcaster: Sky Sport (New Zealand)
- Sponsor: Synergy Hair
- Level on pyramid: 2
- Related competitions: ANZ Premiership
- Website: National Netball League

The National Netball League is a New Zealand Netball league. Since 2016, it has served as a second-level league, initially below the ANZ Championship and later below the ANZ Premiership. It is organised by Netball New Zealand. Between 2016 and 2020, due to sponsorship and naming rights arrangements, the NNL was known as the Beko Netball League. Since 2022, the league has been sponsored by Synergy Hair and, as a result, it is now known as the Synergy Hair National League. The teams in the competition are effectively the reserve teams of ANZ Premiership teams. Netball South won the inaugural title in 2016. Central Zone/Central Manawa have been the league's most successful team, winning three titles in a row between 2017 and 2019. A limited number of matches are broadcast live on Sky Sport (New Zealand).

== History ==
=== Foundation ===
The National Netball League was founded in 2016 by Netball New Zealand. Netball South won the inaugural title after defeating Central Zone 51–46 in the grand final at The Trusts Arena. At the 2016 New Zealand Netball Awards, Netball South winning the inaugural title was named Moment of the Year.

=== Central three titles ===
Between 2017 and 2019, Central Zone/Central Manawa won three successive titles. After finishing as runners up in 2016, Central Zone won their first title in 2017. With a team featuring Karin Burger, Kimiora Poi and Tiana Metuarau, Central Zone defeated Hellers Netball Mainland 43–41 in the grand final. They completed a three in a row after retaining the title in both 2018 and 2019.

=== COVID-19 pandemic ===
On 27 March 2020, Netball New Zealand announced that the Beko Netball League had been cancelled for 2020 because of the COVID-19 pandemic. On 21 July, with the support and backing of Sport New Zealand, it was announced that a modified 2020 season would take place in August. A single round of matches would be played over three consecutive weekends in Auckland, Wellington and Te Aroha. However, due to another shift in COVID-19 alert levels in August, Netball New Zealand announced that the revised 2020 Beko Netball League was also cancelled.

== Teams ==
The five founding five members of the National Netball League were effectively the reserve teams of the five New Zealand ANZ Championship teams – Central Pulse, Mainland Tactix, Northern Mystics, Southern Steel and Waikato Bay of Plenty Magic. When the ANZ Championship was replaced in New Zealand by the ANZ Premiership, it featured a sixth team, Northern Stars. The National Netball League also gained a sixth team, Northern Comets.

Team	Affiliate	Venue
Central Manawa ^{(Note 1)}	Central Pulse	Te Rauparaha Arena
Netball Mainland Hellers	Mainland Tactix	
Northern Comets	Northern Stars	
Northern Marvels	Northern Mystics	Netball Waitakere, Auckland
Southern Blast ^{(Note 2)}	Southern Steel	
Waikato Bay of Plenty Matarau^{(Note 2)}	Waikato Bay of Plenty Magic	

Notes

- ^1 Between 2016 and 2018 Central Manawa played as Central Zone.
- ^2 Southern Blast originally played as Netball South
- ^3 Waikato Bay of Plenty Matarau originally played as Waikato Bay of Plenty

== Grand Finals ==
Season	Winners	Score	Runners up	Venue
2016	Netball South	51–46	Central Zone	The Trusts Arena
2017	Central Zone	43–41	Hellers Netball Mainland	The Trusts Arena
2018	Central Zone	62–53	Waikato Bay of Plenty	Pulman Arena, Takanini
2019	Central Manawa	49–46	Waikato Bay of Plenty	Horncastle Arena
2020	^{(Note 3)}			
2021	Northern Marvels	64–56	Northern Comets	The Trusts Arena
2022	Central Manawa	49–41	Mainland	Pulman Arena, Takanini
2023	Central Manawa	45–43	Northern Comets	TSB Bank Arena
2024	Northern Comets	56–51	Central Manawa	Te Rauparaha Arena
2025	Mainland	48–44	Central Manawa	TSB Arena

Notes

- ^3 The 2020 season was cancelled due to the COVID-19 pandemic in New Zealand.

== Awards ==
=== Player of the Year ===
Season	Winner	Team
2016	Karin Burger	Central Zone
2017	Mila Reuelu-Buchanan	Central Zone
2018	Simmon Howe	Waikato Bay of Plenty
2019	Ali Wilshier	Waikato Bay of Plenty
2021	Saviour Tui	Northern Marvels
2022	Ainsleyana Puleiata	Central Manawa
2023	Lisa Putt	Northern Comets
2024	Crystal Maro	Northern Comets
2025	Te Ata Hassan	Mainland

== Television coverage ==
Since 2016, a limited number of matches, including grand finals, have been broadcast live on Sky Sport (New Zealand).

== Main sponsors ==
	Years
Beko	2016–2020
Synergy Hair	2022–
