= Brendon Egan =

New Zealand sports writer

Brendon James Egan (born 17 December 1984) is a New Zealand sports writer for The Press in Christchurch. He mainly covers netball, basketball, and cricket.

At the start of 2013, Egan travelled to the United States as a scholarship recipient of the Bell Journalism Prize. He was also named as one of two winners of the Sir John Wells Sports Journalism Scholarship, which was announced at the 2012 Sir Terry McLean sports journalism awards.

In 2010, Egan was named the National Basketball League's writer of the year and was a finalist in the young sports writer of the year award at the Sir Terry McLean sports journalism awards in Auckland.
