= Ainsleyana Puleiata =

Samoan New Zealander netball player (born 2000)

Ainsleyana Puleiata (born 23 July 2000) is a Samoan New Zealander netball player who has represented Samoa internationally. She plays for the Central Pulse.

Puleiata is from Porirua and was educated at Windley School and St Mary's College, Wellington. She later studied at Victoria University of Wellington, and in 2021 was named their Pasifika Sportsperson of the Year.

Puleiata played both rugby and netball at school, and in 2017 signed for netball team Central Manawa. In January 2018 she was selected to be part of the rugby sevens training squad for 2018 Summer Youth Olympics. In 2018 she suffered a knee injury while playing rugby which ruled her out for the entire year. In November 2018 she was named captain of the Central Manawa team for the 2019 season, but damaged the same knee in a pre-season match, requiring further time off.

In September 2020 she was named to the New Zealand under-21 netball training squad for the 2021 Netball World Youth Cup. She was also named to the 2021 Central Manawa team. In June 2022 she was selected for the Central Pulse.

In July 2022 she was selected to the Samoa national netball team for the 2023 Netball World Cup Oceania qualifiers. On 18 July 2022 she was named team captain.
