= Central Manawa =

New Zealand netball team

- Founded: 2016
- Based in: Wellington
- Regions: Hawke's Bay Region; Manawatū-Whanganui; Taranaki; Wellington Region
- Head coach: Ngarama Milner-Olsen
- Premierships: 5 (2017, 2018, 2019, 2022, 2023)
- League: National Netball League
Uniform

Central Manawa are a New Zealand netball team based in Wellington. Since 2016 they have represented Netball Central in the National Netball League. Netball Central is the governing body that represents the Hawke's Bay, Manawatū-Whanganui, Taranaki and Wellington Regions. They are effectively the reserve team of Central Pulse. Between 2016 and 2018 they played as Central Zone. Since 2019, they have played as Central Manawa. Between 2017 and 2019, Central Zone/Central Manawa won three successive NNL titles. In 2022, Central Manawa won a fourth title.

== History ==
=== Foundation ===
In 2016, Central Zone where founder members of Netball New Zealand's National Netball League. In the inaugural grand final a Central Zone team coached by Yvette McCausland-Durie lost 51–46 to Netball South.

=== Three successive titles ===
In 2017, Central Zone won their first National Netball League title. With a team featuring Karin Burger, Rhiarna Ferris, Tiana Metuarau, Kimiora Poi and Ainsleyana Puleiata, they won the title after defeating Hellers Netball Mainland 43–41 in the grand final at The Trusts Arena. Central Zone retained the title in 2018 after defeating Waikato Bay of Plenty 62–53 in the grand final. Ahead of the 2019 season, the team adopted a new name, voted on by the public. The now renamed Central Manawa, completed a three in a row after defeating Waikato Bay of Plenty 49–46 in the 2019 grand final.

=== Fourth title ===
In 2022 with a team featuring Renee Matoe, Parris Mason and Amelia Walmsley, Central Manawa won a fourth title after defeating Mainland 49–41 in the grand final.

=== Fifth title ===
In 2023, with a team featuring Parris Mason, Central Manawa, won their fifth National Netball League title after defeating Northern Comets 45–43 in the grand final at TSB Bank Arena.

== Grand Finals ==
Season	Winners	Score	Runners up	Venue
2016	Netball South	51–46	Central Zone	The Trusts Arena
2017	Central Zone	43–41	Hellers Netball Mainland	The Trusts Arena
2018	Central Zone	62–53	Waikato Bay of Plenty	Pulman Arena, Takanini
2019	Central Manawa	49–46	Waikato Bay of Plenty	Horncastle Arena
2022	Central Manawa	49–41	Mainland	Pulman Arena, Takanini
2023	Central Manawa	45–43	Northern Comets	TSB Bank Arena

== Notable players ==
=== Internationals ===
New Zealand

- Karin Burger
- Maddy Gordon
- Mila Reuelu-Buchanan
- Tiana Metuarau
- Kimiora Poi
- Elle Temu

Samoa

- Eseta Autagavaia
- Ainsleyana Puleiata
- Saviour Tui

Tonga

- 'Api Taufa
- Salote Taufa

=== Central Pulse players ===
- Te Amo Amaru-Tibble
- Sheridan Bignall
- Paris Lokotui
- Parris Mason
- Renee Matoe
- Renee Savai'inaea
- Amelia Walmsley

=== ANZ Premiership players ===
- Abby Erwood
- Kelsey McPhee
- Grace Namana

=== Others ===
- Rhiarna Ferris, New Zealand women's rugby sevens international

=== NNL Player of the Year ===
Season	Winner
2016	Karin Burger
2017	Mila Reuelu-Buchanan
2022	Ainsleyana Puleiata

== Coaches ==
=== Head coaches ===
Coach	Years
Yvette McCausland-Durie	2016
Natalie Milicich	2017
Pelesa Semu	2018–2019
Anna Andrews-Tasola	2019–2022
Ngarama Milner-Olsen	2022–

=== Assistant coaches ===
Coach	Years
Frances Solia	2016
Anna Andrews-Tasola	2017–2019
Emma Weenink	2019–2022
John Atkins	2019–2022
Cushla Lichtwark	2022–
Renee Matoe	2022–

== Honours ==
- National Netball League
  - Winners: 2017, 2018, 2019, 2022, 2023
  - Runners Up: 2016
