= Claire Kersten =

New Zealand netball player

Personal information
- Born: 9 July 1989 (age 37)
- Height: 1.74 m (5 ft 9 in)
- Relative: William Kersten

Netball career
- Playing positions: WD, C
| Years | Club team | Apps |
| 2013–2021 | Central Pulse | |
| 2022–2023 | Waikato Bay of Plenty Magic | |
| Years | National team | Caps |
| 2017–present | Silver Ferns | 21 |
- Updated on 17 December 2012

Claire Kersten (born 9 July 1989) is a New Zealand netball player who plays in the ANZ Premiership, playing for the Waikato Bay of Plenty Magic. Claire can play WD and C. In 2013, she made her ANZ Championship debut for the Central Pulse.

She was in the NZ U21 team in the 2009 World Youth Championships, where she won a silver medal.
