= Katrina Rore =

New Zealand netball player

Personal information
- Full name: Katrina Rore (Née: Grant)
- Born: 6 May 1987 (age 39) Papakura, New Zealand
- Height: 1.87 m (6 ft 2 in)
- Spouse: Joel Rore (m. 2018)
- School: Auckland Girls' Grammar School
- University: University of Otago

Netball career
- Playing positions: GK, GD, WD
Years	Club team	Apps
2005	Canterbury Flames	6
2006–2007	Otago Rebels	13
2008–2009	Southern Steel	27
2019	NSW Swifts	7
2010–2020	Central Pulse	150
2026	NSW Swifts	3
Years	National team	Caps
2008–2022	New Zealand	137
Medal record
Representing New Zealand
Women's netball
Commonwealth Games
Gold medal – first place	2010 Delhi	Tournament
World Netball Series
Gold medal – first place	2009 Manchester	Fastnet
Silver medal – second place	2011 Liverpool	Fastnet
Netball World Cup
Gold medal – first place	2019 Liverpool	Tournament
Silver medal – second place	2015 Sydney	Tournament
- Updated on 19 September 2019

Katrina Rore (née Grant; born 6 May 1987 in Papakura, Auckland, New Zealand) is a New Zealand international netball player. Rore is a previous captain of the New Zealand national netball team, the Silver Ferns, and most notably played for the Central Pulse in the ANZ Championship. Rore signed to the New South Wales Swifts in the Suncorp Super Netball league in the latter half of the 2018–2019 season following the Netball World Cup.

In domestic netball, Rore previously played for the Canterbury Flames in the National Bank Cup in 2005, before moving south for a two-year stint with the Otago Rebels (2006–07). In the ANZ Championship, she played for the Southern Steel in 2008 and 2009, before signing with the Wellington-based Central Pulse for 2010.

Rore was included in the Silver Ferns team for 2008. She made her on-court debut the same year against Australia, partnering Casey Williams in the defence circle. She also played with the Silver Ferns at the 2009 World Netball Series in Manchester and the 2010 Commonwealth Games in Delhi, with New Zealand winning gold medals at both events. Rore was selected as the 26th captain of the Silver Ferns in 2017, however her leadership fell under criticism when the team did not win a medal at the 2018 Commonwealth Games. Rore failed to make the Silver Ferns selection under Noeline Taurua coaching for the 2019 Netball Quad Series she was however re-selected for the 2019 Netball World Cup.

Rore was named the 2018 ANZ Premiership Player of the Year.

December 2022 Rore announced her official retirement from international netball, Rore was only one of five Silver Ferns to become a centurion with 137 caps to her name behind Irene van Dyk, Maria Folau, Leana de Bruin and Laura Langman.

In April 2026, Rore briefly returned to the NSW Swifts as a temporary replacement after Sarah Klau was injured. She joined the squad on a short-term basis to help cover the defensive position during Klau’s absence.

== Personal life ==
Katrina Rore is married to Joel Rore, to whom she proposed in Fiji. Rore missed the 2021 season due to pregnancy, and gave birth to the couple's first child, in May that year. Rore planned to make her domestic comeback in 2022 with the Waikato Bay of Plenty Magic, but this did not eventuate after she announced her second pregnancy.
