= Te Rauparaha Arena =

Indoor sports arena in Porirua, New Zealand

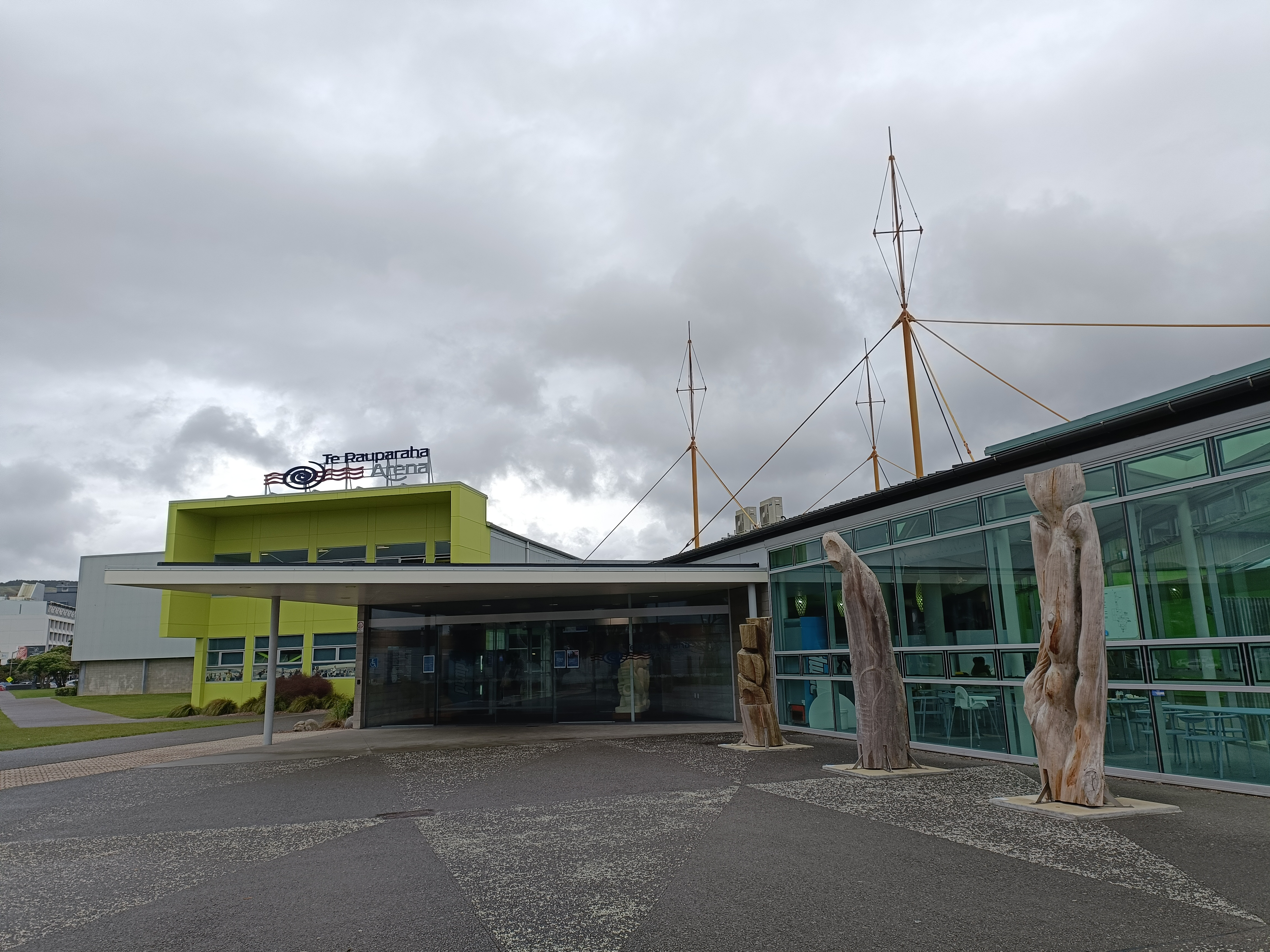
- Interactive map of Te Rauparaha Arena
- Location: 17 Parumoana Street, Porirua, New Zealand 5022
- Coordinates: 41.13264°S 174.838034°E
- Owner: Porirua City Council
- Capacity: 3,000

Construction
- Groundbreaking: January 2008; 18 years ago
- Opened: 21 November 2008; 17 years ago
- Cost: 17.5 million
- Architects: Stephenson & Turner9

Website
- terauparaha-arena.co.nz

Te Rauparaha Arena is a multi-purpose indoor sports and entertainment centre, with pools, Dash Swim School, a fitness centre, and indoor sports stadium and venues, in Porirua, New Zealand. The centre, which cost NZ$17.5 million to construct, was officially opened on 21 November 2008.

The main stadium has a maximum capacity of 3,000, while a secondary stadium can hold another 500 people. The venue was named by the Ngāti Toa iwi after one of their most famous leaders, Te Rauparaha.

== History ==
The venue was built as a replacement for the Porirua Recreation Centre, which went into the administration of the Porirua City Council in 1998 after it was no longer able to be maintained. The council decided to replace it with a larger sports and entertainment centre in 2000. Following years of designing and community consultation, construction of the present venue began in January 2008, and celebrated its official opening on 21 November that year.

== Events ==
Te Rauparaha Arena is an alternate home venue for the Central Pulse in the ANZ Championship (now the Mojo Pulse). In 2009, it was the venue at which the Pulse recorded their first victory in the ANZ Championship, with a 53–52 victory over 2008 champions the New South Wales Swifts.

It hosted the Māori Art Market in 2009 and 2011.

Other events held at the Arena have included the Home, Living and Leisure Show, Dunkleys Great NZ Craft Show, Wedding Expo, Education in the Classroom conferences, Raggamuffin Roadtrip, and Kolohe Kai.

Sporting fixtures at the Arena have included the Silver Ferns, NZ Breakers, Exodus Saints, NZ Tall Ferns, NZ Indoor Bowls Nationals, FIBA Oceania U19s Basketball Championship, FIBA Oceania Championships 2013 and the Oceania World Qualifying Volleyball Championships.
