= 2022 Central Pulse season =

Central Pulse season

Central Pulse
- 2022 season
- Head coach: Yvette McCausland-Durie
- Asst. coach: Anna Andrews-Tasola
- Manager: Jill Clapcott
- Co-captains: Kelly Jury; Tiana Metuarau
- Main venue: TSB Bank Arena

Season results
- Wins–losses: 11–5
- Regular season: 1st
- Finals placing: 1st
- Team colours

Central Pulse seasons
- ← 2021 2023 →

The 2022 Central Pulse season saw the Central Pulse netball team compete in the 2022 ANZ Premiership. With a team coached by Yvette McCausland-Durie, co-captained by Kelly Jury and Tiana Metuarau and featuring Aliyah Dunn, Erikana Pedersen and Whitney Souness, Central Pulse won their third title. Pulse finished the regular season as minor premiers, finishing above Northern Stars and Northern Mystics. Pulse defeated Stars 56–37 in the Grand final.

== Players ==
=== Player movements ===
Gains and losses
▲ Gains	▼ Losses
Courtney Elliott (Northern Mendi Rays); Temalisi Fakahokotau^{(Note 1)} (Mainland Tactix); Binnian Hunt (Sunshine Coast Lightning); Kristiana Manu'a (Giants Netball); Renee Matoe (Central Manawa); Tiana Metuarau (Southern Steel); Erikana Pedersen (Mainland Tactix); Amelia Walmsley (Northern Comets/Mainland Tactix)	Ameliaranne Ekenasio (Waikato Bay of Plenty Magic); Temalisi Fakahokotau^{(Note 1)} (Saracens Mavericks); Claire Kersten (Waikato Bay of Plenty Magic); Parris Mason (Central Manawa); Kelera Nawai-Caucau (Mainland Tactix); Ivana Rowland (Waikato Bay of Plenty Magic); Te Amo Amaru-Tibble

Notes

- ^1 Temalisi Fakahokotau initially signed for Central Pulse but in January 2022 announced she would be taking a break from netball. However she subsequently joined Saracens Mavericks as a replacement player for the 2022 Netball Superleague season.

=== 2022 roster ===
2022 Central Pulse roster
Players
Coaching staff

Nat.	Name	Position(s)	DoB	Height
(New Zealand)	Aliyah Dunn	GS	19 October 1999 (aged 22)	1.90 m (6 ft 3 in)
(New Zealand)	Courtney Elliott	GK, GD, WD	25 September 1998 (aged 23)	1.80 m (5 ft 11 in)
(New Zealand)	Maddy Gordon	C, WA, WD	16 January 2000 (aged 22)	1.74 m (5 ft 9 in)
(Australia)	Binnian Hunt	GA, WA	11 April 1998 (aged 23)	1.83 m (6 ft 0 in)
(New Zealand)	Kelly Jury (cc)	GK, GD	22 October 1996 (aged 25)	1.92 m (6 ft 4 in)
(New Zealand)	Paris Lokotui	WD, C	17 October 2001 (aged 20)	1.82 m (6 ft 0 in)
(Australia)	Kristiana Manu'a	GK, GD, WD	3 September 1995 (aged 26)	1.82 m (6 ft 0 in)
(New Zealand)	Renee Matoe	GS, GA		–
(New Zealand)	Tiana Metuarau (cc)	GA, WA, GS	15 January 2001 (aged 21)	1.83 m (6 ft 0 in)
(New Zealand)	Erikana Pedersen (TRP)	C, WA, WD	28 July 1994 (aged 27)	1.73 m (5 ft 8 in)
(New Zealand)	Whitney Souness	C, WA	12 November 1995 (aged 26)	1.74 m (5 ft 9 in)
(New Zealand)	Amelia Walmsley	GS, GA	31 January 2004 (aged 18)	1.92 m (6 ft 4 in)

Head coach

- Yvette McCausland-Durie

Assistant coach

- Anna Andrews-Tasola

Manager: Jill Clapcott
Physiotherapist: Ari Carroll
Specialist Coach:
Waimarama Taumaunu

Notes

- (c) – Captain
- (cc) – Co-captain
- (vc) – Vice-captain
- – Injury / maternity leave
- (TRP) – Temporary Replacement Player

== Impact of COVID-19 pandemic ==
Just like the 2020 season, the 2022 season was impacted by the COVID-19 pandemic. Central Pulse were due to host the sixth edition of the official ANZ Premiership tournament at Te Wānanga o Raukawa in Otaki between 24 and 27 February. However, the tournament was cancelled after a change in COVID-19 alert levels. Pulse's Round 1 match against Northern Stars was cancelled following a COVID-19 outbreak in their squad. Their head coach Yvette McCausland-Durie also tested positive for COVID-19.

== Regular season ==
=== Fixtures and results ===
Round 1

Mon 14 Mar	Northern Stars	^{(Note 2)}	Central Pulse	Pulman Arena
7.15pm		Report

Round 2

Sat 19 Mar	Central Pulse	60–66	Northern Mystics	Te Rauparaha Arena
4.10pm	Aliyah Dunn 45/49 (92%); Tiana Metuarau 15/19 (79%)	Report; Stats	Grace Nweke 49/51 (96%); Monica Falkner 11/16 (69%); Filda Vui 6/7 (86%)

Sun 20 Mar	Central Pulse	57–41	Waikato Bay of Plenty Magic	Te Rauparaha Arena
4.10pm	Aliyah Dunn 41/45 (91%); Tiana Metuarau 14/16 (88%); Renee Matoe 2/2 (100%)	Report; Stats	Bailey Mes 19/23 (83%); Ivana Rowland 15/18 (83%); Ameliaranne Ekenasio 5/6 (83%); Martina Reekers 2/2 (100%)

Round 3

Sun 27 Mar	Northern Mystics	62–61	Central Pulse	The Trusts Arena
2.10pm	Grace Nweke 55/60 (92%); Filda Vui 4/6 (67%); Monica Falkner 3/8 (38%)	Report; Stats	Aliyah Dunn 38/41 (93%); Tiana Metuarau 23/30 (77%)

Round 4

Sun 3 Apr	Waikato Bay of Plenty Magic	50–51	Central Pulse	Globox Arena
4.10pm	Bailey Mes 24/28 (86%); Ameliaranne Ekenasio 18/21 (86%); Ivana Rowland 8/10 (80%)	Report; Stats	Aliyah Dunn 37/40 (93%); Tiana Metuarau 14/17 (82%)

Round 5

Mon 11 Apr	Central Pulse	63–66	Southern Steel	TSB Bank Arena
7.15pm	Aliyah Dunn 52/53 (98%); Tiana Metuarau 11/12 (92%)	Report; Stats	George Fisher 48/50 (96%); Georgia Heffernan 15/16 (94%); Saviour Tui 3/7 (43%)

Round 6

Mon 18 Apr	Waikato Bay of Plenty Magic	39–52	Central Pulse	Energy Events Centre
7.15pm	Ameliaranne Ekenasio 21/27 (78%); Brooke Leaver 10/10 (100%); Ivana Rowland 8/10 (80%)	Report; Stats	Aliyah Dunn 35/37 (95%); Tiana Metuarau 13/16 (81%); Amelia Walmsley 4/5 (80%)

Round 7

Sun 24 Apr	Central Pulse	58–41	Mainland Tactix	TSB Bank Arena
2.10pm	Aliyah Dunn 43/46 (93%); Tiana Metuarau 13/16 (81%); Amelia Walmsley 2/2 (100%)	Report; Stats	Ellie Bird 25/29 (86%); Te Paea Selby-Rickit 12/17 (71%); Vika Koloto 4/4 (100%)

Wed 27 Apr	Northern Stars	46–56	Central Pulse	Pulman Arena
7.15pm	Maia Wilson 26/28 (93%); Jamie Hume 14/20 (70%); Amorangi Malesala 6/9 (67%)	Report; Stats	Aliyah Dunn 37/39 (95%); Tiana Metuarau 19/25 (76%)

Round 8

Sun 1 May	Central Pulse	46–47	Northern Stars	Fly Palmy Arena
4.10pm	Aliyah Dunn 29/31 (94%); Tiana Metuarau 17/21 (81%)	Report; Stats	Jamie Hume 24/32 (75%); Maia Wilson 23/29 (79%)

Round 9

Mon 9 May	Southern Steel	44–50	Central Pulse	Edgar Centre
7.15pm	George Fisher 29/34 (85%); Saviour Tui 14/16 (88%); Georgia Heffernan 1/4 (25%)	Report; Stats	Aliyah Dunn 36/37 (97%); Tiana Metuarau 14/19 (74%)

Round 10

Sun 15 May	Central Pulse	44–49	Northern Stars	TSB Bank Arena
4.10pm	Aliyah Dunn 28/32 (88%); Tiana Metuarau 16/19 (84%)	Report; Stats	Maia Wilson 36/42 (86%); Amorangi Malesala 8/10 (80%); Jamie Hume 5/9 (56%)

Round 11

Sat 21 May	Southern Steel	49–59	Central Pulse	Stadium Southland
4.10pm	George Fisher 39/41 (95%); Georgia Heffernan 10/20 (50%); Kiana Pelasio 0/1 (0%)	Report; Stats	Aliyah Dunn 44/45 (98%); Tiana Metuarau 14/16 (88%); Amelia Walmsley 1/1 (100%)

Mon 23 May	Central Pulse	62–49	Mainland Tactix	TSB Bank Arena
7.15pm	Aliyah Dunn 43/48 (90%); Tiana Metuarau 17/20 (85%); Renee Matoe 1/1 (100%); Amelia Walmsley 1/1 (100%)	Report; Stats	Ellie Bird 39/45 (87%); Te Paea Selby-Rickit 10/12 (83%)

Round 12

Sat 28 May	Northern Mystics	^{(Note 2)}	Central Pulse	The Trusts Arena
4.10pm		Report

Mon 30 May	Mainland Tactix	43–51	Central Pulse	Christchurch Arena
7.15pm	Hannah Glen 19/23 (83%); Te Paea Selby-Rickit 18/22 (82%); Ellie Bird 6/6 (100%)	Report; Stats	Aliyah Dunn 29/33 (88%); Tiana Metuarau 22/26 (85%)

Round 13

Fri 3 Jun	Northern Mystics	40–58	Central Pulse	The Trusts Arena
7.10pm	Grace Namana 32/37 (86%); Monica Falkner 5/6 (83%); Filda Vui 2/2 (100%); Phoenix Karaka 1/3 (33%)	Report; Stats	Aliyah Dunn 37/41 (90%); Tiana Metuarau 17/21 (81%); Amelia Walmsley 3/4 (75%); Renee Matoe 1/2 (50%)

Notes

- ^2 Matches postponed under the ANZ Premiership's COVID-19 Match Postponement Policy.

=== Final standings ===
2022 ANZ Premiership ladder
Pos	Team	P	W	D	L	GF	GA	GD	G%	BP	Pts
1	Central Pulse	15	10	0	5	828	732	96	113.1%	4	34
2	Northern Stars	15	11	0	4	836	783	53	106.8%	1	34
3	Northern Mystics	15	9	0	6	858	807	51	106.3%	4	31
4	Southern Steel	15	6	0	9	853	898	-45	95%	2	20
5	Waikato Bay of Plenty Magic	15	4	0	11	733	803	-70	91.3%	4	16
6	Mainland Tactix	15	5	0	10	788	873	-85	90.3%	1	16
Last updated: 12 August 2022

Qualified for Grand final
Qualified for Elimination final

== Finals Series ==
=== Grand final ===
12 June 2022	Central Pulse	56–37	Northern Stars	TSB Bank Arena	Sky Sport
12 June 2022	Scoring by quarter: 15–6, 26–15, 42–26, 56–37			TSB Bank Arena	Sky Sport
12 June 2022	Aliyah Dunn 44/47 (94%); Tiana Metuarau 11/13 (85%); Amelia Walmsley 1/2 (50%); Renee Matoe 0/2 (0%)		Maia Wilson 21/25 (84%); Amorangi Malesala 13/17 (76%); Jamie Hume 3/4 (75%)	TSB Bank Arena	Sky Sport

== National Netball League ==
With a team featuring Renee Matoe, Parris Mason and Amelia Walmsley, Pulse's reserve team, Central Manawa, won the 2022 National Netball League title after defeating Mainland 49–41 in the grand final.

== Awards ==
=== New Zealand Netball Awards ===
Award	Winner
Dame Lois Muir Supreme Award	Kelly Jury
ANZ Premiership Player of the Year	Kelly Jury
ANZ Premiership Coach of the Year	Yvette McCausland-Durie

Notes

- ^4 Kelly Jury shared the Dame Lois Muir Supreme Award with Grace Nweke (Northern Mystics).

=== ANZ Premiership Awards ===
Award	Winner
Grand Final MVP	Kelly Jury

=== Team of the season ===
Four Central Pulse players were included in Brendon Egan's Stuff's team of the season.

Stuff Super Seven

Position	Player
GA	Tiana Metuarau
WD	Maddy Gordon
GK	Kelly Jury

Bench

Positions	Player
WA, C	Whitney Souness
