= 2021 Mainland Tactix season =

Mainland Tactix season

Mainland Tactix
- 2021 season
- Head coach: Marianne Delaney-Hoshek
- Asst. coach: Julie Seymour
- Manager: Toni Torepe
- Captain: Jane Watson
- Main venue: Christchurch Arena

Season results
- Wins–losses: 10–7
- Regular season: 3rd
- Finals placing: 2nd
- Team colours

Mainland Tactix seasons
- ← 2020 2022 →

The 2021 Mainland Tactix season saw the Mainland Tactix netball team compete in the 2021 ANZ Premiership. With a team coached by Marianne Delaney-Hoshek, captained by Jane Watson and featuring Ellie Bird, Karin Burger, Erikana Pedersen, Kimiora Poi and Te Paea Selby-Rickit, Tactix finished the regular ANZ Premiership season in third place, behind Northern Mystics and Southern Steel. In the Elimination final, Tactix defeated Steel 54–49. However, in the grand final, they lost 61–59 to Mystics, finishing the season second overall.

== Players ==
=== Player movements ===
Gains and losses
▲ Gains	▼ Losses
Karin Burger (Central Pulse); Hannah Glen (NNL Mainland); Kate Grant (Lincoln University); Amelia Walmsley (Northern Comets)	Temalisi Fakahokotau (Waikato Bay of Plenty Magic)

=== 2021 roster ===
2021 Mainland Tactix roster
Players
Coaching staff

Nat.	Name	Position(s)	DoB	Height
(New Zealand)	Ellie Bird	GS, GA	22 March 1993 (aged 28)	1.96 m (6 ft 5 in)
(New Zealand)	Karin Burger	GD, WD, GK	12 April 1993 (aged 28)	1.84 m (6 ft 0 in)
(New Zealand)	Charlotte Elley	WD, C	24 June 1996 (aged 24)	1.74 m (5 ft 9 in)
(New Zealand)	Sophia Fenwick	GK, GD	12 December 1992 (aged 28)	1.81 m (5 ft 11 in)
(New Zealand)	Hannah Glen (TRP)	GS, GA	12 November 2000 (aged 20)	1.89 m (6 ft 2 in)
(New Zealand)	Kate Grant (TRP)	GS	15 June 1990 (aged 30)	–
(New Zealand)	Samon Nathan	WA, C, WD	7 December 1992 (aged 28)	1.78 m (5 ft 10 in)
(New Zealand)	Erikana Pedersen	C, WA, WD	28 July 1994 (aged 26)	1.73 m (5 ft 8 in)
(New Zealand)	Kimiora Poi	C, WA	1 November 1997 (aged 23)	1.68 m (5 ft 6 in)
(New Zealand)	Jess Prosser	GS, GA	9 June 1996 (aged 24)	1.83 m (6 ft 0 in)
(New Zealand)	Te Paea Selby-Rickit	GS, GA	14 January 1992 (aged 29)	1.93 m (6 ft 4 in)
(New Zealand)	Amelia Walmsley (TRP)	GS, GA	31 January 2004 (aged 17)	1.92 m (6 ft 4 in)
(New Zealand)	Jane Watson (c)	GK, GD, WD	7 March 1990 (aged 30)	1.81 m (5 ft 11 in)

Head coach

- (New Zealand) Marianne Delaney- Hoshek

Assistant coach

- (New Zealand) Julie Seymour

Manager: Toni Torepe
Physiotherapist:
Sonya White
Strength and conditioning:
John Wilson
Performance Analyst:
Ben Hibbs

Notes

- (c) – Captain
- (cc) – Co-captain
- (vc) – Vice-captain
- – Injury / maternity leave
- (TRP) – Temporary Replacement Player

== Pre-season ==
=== Timaru series ===
Mainland Tactix played Southern Steel in a two match series in Timaru. Tactix won both matches.

Fri 12 Mar	Mainland Tactix	64–45	Southern Steel	Southern Trust Events Centre
				Attendance: 1200

Sat 13 Mar	Mainland Tactix	63–47	Southern Steel	Southern Trust Events Centre
				Attendance: 1200

=== Otaki tournament ===
Mainland Tactix participated in the official ANZ Premiership tournament at Te Wānanga o Raukawa in Otaki between 26 and 28 March. All six ANZ Premiership teams took part. With two wins and a draw, Tactix were the only team not to lose a match.

Fri 26 Mar	Central Pulse	39–55	Mainland Tactix	Te Wānanga o Raukawa
10:00am

Sat 27 Mar	Mainland Tactix	64–56	Northern Mystics	Te Wānanga o Raukawa
9:00am

Sun 28 Mar	Mainland Tactix	49–49	Northern Stars	Te Wānanga o Raukawa
12:00pm

== Regular season ==
=== Fixtures and results ===
Round 1

Sun 18 Apr	Southern Steel	54–36	Mainland Tactix	Stadium Southland
6.15pm	George Fisher 46/49 (94%); Tiana Metuarau 8/14 (57%)	Report; Stats	Ellie Bird 22/27 (81%); Jess Prosser 7/9 (78%); Hannah Glen 7/12 (58%)

Round 2

Sun 25 Apr	Northern Stars	57–43	Mainland Tactix	Pulman Arena
4.15pm	Maia Wilson 40/45 (89%); Jamie Hume 17/20 (85%)	Report; Stats	Ellie Bird 31/34 (91%); Jess Prosser 11/14 (79%); Hannah Glen 1/2 (50%)

Round 3

Mon 3 May	Northern Mystics	53–52	Mainland Tactix	The Trusts Arena
7.15pm	Grace Nweke 49/56 (88%); Bailey Mes 4/8 (50%)	Report; Stats	Ellie Bird 39/45 (87%); Te Paea Selby-Rickit 10/18 (56%); Jess Prosser 3/6 (50%)

Round 4

Sun 9 May	Mainland Tactix	63–59	Waikato Bay of Plenty Magic	Christchurch Arena
6.15pm	Ellie Bird 54/55 (98%); Te Paea Selby-Rickit 9/10 (90%); Jess Prosser 0/1 (0%)	Report; Stats	Caitlin Bassett 45/48 (94%); Chiara Semple 5/5 (100%); Khiarna Williams 9/14 (64%)	Attendance: 3,000

Round 5

Mon 17 May	Mainland Tactix	64–63	Northern Mystics	Christchurch Arena
6.15pm	Ellie Bird 44/53 (83%); Te Paea Selby-Rickit 20/29 (69%)	Report; Stats	Grace Nweke 59/64 (92%); Bailey Mes 4/9 (44%)

Round 6

Mon 24 May	Southern Steel	50–60	Mainland Tactix	Stadium Southland
6.15pm	George Fisher 42/49 (86%); Tiana Metuarau 8/10 (80%)	Report; Stats	Ellie Bird 46/48 (96%); Te Paea Selby-Rickit 14/19 (74%)

Round 7

Mon 31 May	Northern Stars	57–56	Mainland Tactix	Pulman Arena
7.15pm	Maia Wilson 38/40 (95%); Jamie Hume 19/25 (76%)	Report; Stats	Ellie Bird 45/49 (92%); Te Paea Selby-Rickit 10/14 (71%); Hannah Glen 1/1 (100%)

Round 8

Sat 5 Jun	Mainland Tactix	55–52	Central Pulse	Christchurch Arena
5.15pm	Ellie Bird 46/57 (81%); Te Paea Selby-Rickit 9/14 (64%)	Report	Aliyah Dunn 47/54 (87%); Whitney Souness 5/9 (56%)

Round 9

Mon 14 Jun	Mainland Tactix	45–47	Southern Steel	Trafalgar Centre
8.15pm	Te Paea Selby-Rickit 18/20 (90%); Amelia Walmsley 16/19 (84%); Kate Grant 11/16 (69%)	Report; Stats	George Fisher 40/44 (91%); Tiana Metuarau 7/7 (100%)

Round 10

Mon 21 Jun	Mainland Tactix	68–51	Waikato Bay of Plenty Magic	Trafalgar Centre
7.15pm	Ellie Bird 47/58 (81%); Te Paea Selby-Rickit 19/23 (83%); Amelia Walmsley 2/2 (100%)	Report; Stats	Caitlin Bassett 32/33 (97%); Khiarna Williams 12/13 (92%); Chiara Semple 7/10 (70%)

Round 11

Sun 27 Jun	Central Pulse	^{(Note 1)}	Mainland Tactix	Te Rauparaha Arena
4.15pm

Round 12

Sun 4 Jul	Mainland Tactix	47–34	Central Pulse	Trafalgar Centre
6.15pm	Ellie Bird 31/40 (78%); Te Paea Selby-Rickit 16/23 (70%)	Report	Aliyah Dunn 21/22 (95%); Ivana Rowland 11/13 (85%); Te Amo Amaru-Tibble 2/4 (50%)

Round 13

Fri 9 Jul	Central Pulse	49–52	Mainland Tactix	Te Rauparaha Arena
	Aliyah Dunn 35/38 (92%); Te Amo Amaru-Tibble 12/18 (67%); Ivana Rowland 2/2 (100%)	Report	Ellie Bird 41/44 (93%); Te Paea Selby-Rickit 11/14 (79%)

Mon 12 Jul	Mainland Tactix	52–39	Northern Stars	Christchurch Arena
7.15pm	Ellie Bird 44/45 (98%); Te Paea Selby-Rickit 8/14 (57%)	Report; Stats	Jamie Hume 15/20 (75%); Maia Wilson 8/16 (50%); Monica Falkner 8/9 (89%); Amorangi Malesala 8/11 (73%)

Round 14

Sun 18 Jul	Waikato Bay of Plenty Magic	47–49	Mainland Tactix	Energy Events Centre
4.15pm	Caitlin Bassett 40/42 (95%); Khiarna Williams 7/12 (58%)	Report; Stats	Ellie Bird 38/42 (90%); Te Paea Selby-Rickit 10/17 (59%); Amelia Walmsley 1/1 (100%)

Round 15

Sun 25 Jul	Mainland Tactix	59–63	Northern Mystics	Christchurch Arena
4.15pm	Ellie Bird 42/44 (95%); Te Paea Selby-Rickit 17/25 (68%)	Report; Stats	Grace Nweke 49/51 (96%); Filda Vui 11/13 (85%); Saviour Tui 2/2 (100%); Bailey Mes 1/1 (100%)

Notes

- ^1 Tactix's Round 11 match against Central Pulse was postponed after a change in COVID-19 alert levels. The match was rescheduled for Friday, 9 July.

=== Final standings ===
2021 ANZ Premiership ladder
Pos	Team	P	W	D	L	GF	GA	GD	G%	BP	Pts
1	Northern Mystics	15	11	0	4	929	873	56	106.4%	4	37
2	Southern Steel	15	11	0	4	818	801	17	102.1%	0	33
3	Mainland Tactix	15	9	0	6	801	775	26	103.4%	4	31
4	Northern Stars	15	9	0	6	825	791	34	104.3%	2	29
5	Central Pulse	15	4	0	11	789	810	-21	97.4%	8	20
6	Waikato Bay of Plenty Magic	15	1	0	14	802	914	-112	87.7%	7	10
Last updated: 9 August 2022

Qualified for Grand final
Qualified for Elimination final

== Finals Series ==
=== Elimination final ===
Sun 1 Aug	Southern Steel	49–54	Mainland Tactix	Stadium Southland	Sky Sport
Sun 1 Aug	Scoring by quarter: 13–15, 18–29, 32–41, 49–54			Stadium Southland	Sky Sport
Sun 1 Aug	George Fisher 39/41 (95%); Tiana Metuarau 10/13 (77%)		Ellie Bird 39/41 (95%); Te Paea Selby-Rickit 15/20 (75%)	Stadium Southland	Sky Sport

=== Grand final ===
Sun 8 Aug	Stats	Northern Mystics	61–59	Mainland Tactix	Spark Arena; Attendance: 5,000	Sky Sport
Sun 8 Aug	Stats	Scoring by quarter: 17–14, 33–28, 48–46, 61–59			Spark Arena; Attendance: 5,000	Sky Sport
Sun 8 Aug	Stats	Grace Nweke 58/62 (94%); Filda Vui 2/3 (67%); Bailey Mes 1/1 (100%)		Ellie Bird 38/44 (86%); Te Paea Selby-Rickit 21/39 (54%)	Spark Arena; Attendance: 5,000	Sky Sport

== Award winners ==
=== New Zealand Netball Awards ===
Award	Winner
ANZ Premiership Player of the Year	Karin Burger
