= 2021 Central Pulse season =

Central Pulse season

Central Pulse
- 2021 season
- Head coach: Gail Parata
- Asst. coach: Pelesa Semu
- Manager: Jill Clapcott
- Captain: Claire Kersten
- Main venue: TSB Bank Arena

Season results
- Wins–losses: 4–11
- Regular season: 5th
- Finals placing: DNQ
- Team colours

Central Pulse seasons
- ← 2020 2022 →

The 2021 Central Pulse season saw the Central Pulse netball team compete in the 2021 ANZ Premiership. The 2021 season saw Gail Parata replace Yvette McCausland-Durie as Pulse's head coach. However, Parata would be replaced by a returning McCausland-Durie after just one season. The team was captained by Claire Kersten. Pulse finished the regular season in 5th place and did not qualify for the Final Series.

== Players ==
=== Player movements ===
Gains and losses
▲ Gains	▼ Losses
Te Amo Amaru-Tibble; Paris Lokotui (Central Manawa); Parris Mason (Central Manawa); Kelera Nawai; Ivana Rowland (NNL Waikato Bay of Plenty); Whitney Souness (Waikato Bay of Plenty Magic)	Karin Burger (Mainland Tactix); Tiana Metuarau (Southern Steel); Katrina Rore (pregnancy); Rene Savai'inaea (Southern Steel); Elle Temu (Northern Stars)

=== 2021 roster ===
2021 Central Pulse roster
Players
Coaching staff

Nat.	Name	Position(s)	DoB	Height
(New Zealand)	Te Amo Amaru-Tibble	GS, GA	11 May 1989 (aged 31)	1.82 m (6 ft 0 in)
(New Zealand)	Aliyah Dunn	GS	19 October 1999 (aged 21)	1.90 m (6 ft 3 in)
(New Zealand)	Ameliaranne Ekenasio^{1} (c) (injured)	GS, GA	11 January 1991 (aged 30)	1.86 m (6 ft 1 in)
(New Zealand)	Maddy Gordon	C, WA, WD	16 January 2000 (aged 21)	1.74 m (5 ft 9 in)
(New Zealand)	Kelly Jury	GK, GD	22 October 1996 (aged 24)	1.92 m (6 ft 4 in)
(New Zealand)	Claire Kersten^{1} (c)	WD, C	9 July 1989 (aged 31)	1.75 m (5 ft 9 in)
(New Zealand)	Paris Lokotui	WD, C	17 October 2001 (aged 19)	1.82 m (6 ft 0 in)
(New Zealand)	Parris Mason	GK, GD	13 December 2002 (aged 18)	1.84 m (6 ft 0 in)
(Fiji)	Kelera Nawai	GK, GD	14 December 1997 (aged 23)	1.87 m (6 ft 2 in)
(New Zealand)	Ivana Rowland (TRP)	GS, GA	16 February 1998 (aged 23)	1.81 m (5 ft 11 in)
(New Zealand)	Whitney Souness	C, WA	12 November 1995 (aged 25)	1.74 m (5 ft 9 in)

Head coach

- (New Zealand) Gail Parata

Assistant coach

- (New Zealand) Pelesa Semu

Manager: Jill Clapcott
Physiotherapist:
Nikki Lynch
Specialist Shooting Coach:
Anna Andrews
Strength and conditioning:
Adam Allen
Analyst: Dessi Broughton

Notes

- (c) – Captain
- (cc) – Co-captain
- (vc) – Vice-captain
- – Injury / maternity leave
- (TRP) – Temporary Replacement Player

Notes

- ^1 Ameliaranne Ekenasio was initially named as captain. However she subsequently missed the entire season. She was rested for the Otaki tournament, then went on medical leave due to fatigue and then became pregnant. She was replaced as captain by Claire Kersten.

== Pre-season ==
=== Otaki tournament ===
Central Pulse hosted the official ANZ Premiership tournament at Te Wānanga o Raukawa in Otaki between 26 and 28 March. All six ANZ Premiership teams took part. Earlier in March, Pulse played friendlies against Waikato Bay of Plenty Magic, Southern Steel and Mainland Tactix.

Fri 26 Mar	Central Pulse	39–55	Mainland Tactix	Te Wānanga o Raukawa
10:00am

Fri 26 Mar	Central Pulse	57–46	Waikato Bay of Plenty Magic	Te Wānanga o Raukawa
6.30pm

Sat 27 Mar	Central Pulse	61–53	Northern Stars	Te Wānanga o Raukawa
6.30pm

Sun 28 Mar	Central Pulse	55–53	Northern Mystics	Te Wānanga o Raukawa
2:00 pm

== Regular season ==
=== Fixtures and results ===
Round 1

Sun 18 Apr	Central Pulse	53–57	Northern Stars	Fly Palmy Arena
4.15pm	Aliyah Dunn 36/39 (92%); Te Amo Amaru-Tibble 17/19 (89%)	Report	Maia Wilson 44/50 (88%); Jamie Hume 10/12 (83%); Monica Falkner 3/4 (75%)

Round 2

Sun 25 Apr	Waikato Bay of Plenty Magic	47–59	Central Pulse	Claudelands Arena
6.15pm	Caitlin Bassett 23/26 (88%); Khiarna Williams 18/20 (90%); Chiara Semple 6/6 (100%)	Report	Aliyah Dunn 41/46 (89%); Te Amo Amaru-Tibble 16/19 (84%); Whitney Souness 2/3 (67%); Ivana Rowland 0/1 (0%)

Round 3

Sunday 2 May	Southern Steel	56–52	Central Pulse	Stadium Southland
4.15pm	George Fisher 48/52 (92%); Tiana Metuarau 8/8 (100%)	Report	Aliyah Dunn 38/39 (97%); Te Amo Amaru-Tibble 14/18 (78%)

Round 4

10 May 2021	Central Pulse	47–58	Northern Mystics	TSB Bank Arena
7.15pm	Aliyah Dunn 27/34 (79%); Te Amo Amaru-Tibble 18/24 (75%); Whitney Souness 2/4 (50%)	Report; Stats	Grace Nweke 51/55 (93%); Bailey Mes 5/7 (71%); Saviour Tui 2/3 (67%)

Round 5

Sun 16 May	Central Pulse	52–56	Southern Steel	Te Rauparaha Arena
4.15pm	Aliyah Dunn 39/40 (98%); Te Amo Amaru-Tibble 13/14 (93%)	Report	George Fisher 44/49 (90%); Tiana Metuarau 12/15 (80%)

Round 6

Sun 23 May	Northern Stars	44–57	Central Pulse	Pulman Arena
4.15pm	Maia Wilson 23/29 (79%); Jamie Hume 13/16 (81%); Amorangi Malesala 8/12 (67%)	Report	Aliyah Dunn 35/39 (90%); Te Amo Amaru-Tibble 22/27 (81%)

Round 7

Sun 30 May	Central Pulse	64–53	Waikato Bay of Plenty Magic	TSB Bank Arena
6.15pm	Aliyah Dunn 42/46 (91%); Te Amo Amaru-Tibble 22/25 (88%)	Report	Caitlin Bassett 47/55 (85%); Grace Kara 6/14 (43%)

Round 8

Sat 5 Jun	Mainland Tactix	55–52	Central Pulse	Christchurch Arena
5.15pm	Ellie Bird 46/57 (81%); Te Paea Selby-Rickit 9/14 (64%)	Report	Aliyah Dunn 47/54 (87%); Whitney Souness 5/9 (56%)

Round 9

Sun 13 Jun	Northern Stars	55–53	Central Pulse	Pulman Arena
6.15pm	Maia Wilson 37/45 (82%); Jamie Hume 18/21 (86%)	Report	Aliyah Dunn 39/46 (85%); Te Amo Amaru-Tibble 14/17 (82%)

Round 10

Sun 20 Jun	Northern Mystics	64–51	Central Pulse	The Trusts Arena
2.15 pm	Grace Nweke 54/63 (86%); Bailey Mes 2/9 (22%); Saviour Tui 2/3 (67%)	Report; Stats	Aliyah Dunn 31/39 (79%); Te Amo Amaru-Tibble 16/20 (80%); Whitney Souness 4/7 (57%)

Round 11

Sun 27 Jun	Central Pulse	^{(Note 2)}	Mainland Tactix	Te Rauparaha Arena
4.15pm

Round 12

Sun 4 Jul	Mainland Tactix	47–34	Central Pulse	Trafalgar Centre
6.15pm	Ellie Bird 31/40 (78%); Te Paea Selby-Rickit 16/23 (70%)	Report	Aliyah Dunn 21/22 (95%); Ivana Rowland 11/13 (85%); Te Amo Amaru-Tibble 2/4 (50%)

Round 13

Fri 9 Jul	Central Pulse	49–52	Mainland Tactix	Te Rauparaha Arena
	Aliyah Dunn 35/38 (92%); Te Amo Amaru-Tibble 12/18 (67%); Ivana Rowland 2/2 (100%)	Report	Ellie Bird 41/44 (93%); Te Paea Selby-Rickit 11/14 (79%)

Sun 11 Jul	Central Pulse	55–51	Waikato Bay of Plenty Magic	TSB Arena
4.15pm	Aliyah Dunn 41/44 (93%); Te Amo Amaru-Tibble 14/17 (82%)	Report	Caitlin Bassett 31/36 (86%); Khiarna Williams 20/23 (87%)

Round 14

18 July 2021	Central Pulse	54–56	Northern Mystics	TSB Bank Arena
6.15pm	Aliyah Dunn 31/36 (86%); Te Amo Amaru-Tibble 18/26 (69%); Ivana Rowland 5/10 (50%)	Report; Stats	Grace Nweke 52/61 (85%); Filda Vui 2/3 (67%); Bailey Mes 2/5 (40%)

Round 15

Sat 24 Jul	Southern Steel	59–57	Central Pulse	Stadium Southland
5.15pm	George Fisher 42/45 (93%); Tiana Metuarau 17/21 (81%)	Report	Aliyah Dunn 36/39 (92%); Te Amo Amaru-Tibble 21/21 (100%)

Notes

- ^2 Pulse's Round 11 match against Mainland Tactix was postponed after a change in COVID-19 alert levels. The match was rescheduled for Friday, 9 July.

=== Final standings ===
2021 ANZ Premiership ladder
Pos	Team	P	W	D	L	GF	GA	GD	G%	BP	Pts
1	Northern Mystics	15	11	0	4	929	873	56	106.4%	4	37
2	Southern Steel	15	11	0	4	818	801	17	102.1%	0	33
3	Mainland Tactix	15	9	0	6	801	775	26	103.4%	4	31
4	Northern Stars	15	9	0	6	825	791	34	104.3%	2	29
5	Central Pulse	15	4	0	11	789	810	-21	97.4%	8	20
6	Waikato Bay of Plenty Magic	15	1	0	14	802	914	-112	87.7%	7	10
Last updated: 9 August 2022

Qualified for Grand final
Qualified for Elimination final
