= 2022 ANZ Premiership season =

Netball league season

- League: ANZ Premiership
- Sport: Netball
- Duration: 13 March – 12 June 2022
- Teams: 6
- TV partner: Sky Sport (New Zealand)
- Minor premiers: Central Pulse
- Season MVP: Kelly Jury (Central Pulse)

Finals
- Champions: Central Pulse
- Runners-up: Northern Stars

ANZ Premiership seasons
- ← 2021 2023 →

The 2022 ANZ Premiership season was the sixth season of Netball New Zealand's ANZ Premiership. With a team coached by Yvette McCausland-Durie, co-captained by Kelly Jury and Tiana Metuarau and featuring Aliyah Dunn, Erikana Pedersen and Whitney Souness, Central Pulse won their third title. Pulse finished the regular season as minor premiers, finishing above Northern Stars and Northern Mystics. In the Elimination final, Stars defeated Mystics 63–57. Pulse then defeated Stars 56–37 in the Grand final.

== Transfers ==
Player	2021 team	2022 team
Courtney Elliott	Northern Mendi Rays	Central Pulse
Temalisi Fakahokotau^{(Note 1)}	Mainland Tactix	Central Pulse/Saracens Mavericks
Binnian Hunt	Sunshine Coast Lightning	Central Pulse
Kristiana Manu'a	Giants Netball	Central Pulse
Tiana Metuarau	Southern Steel	Central Pulse
Erikana Pedersen	Mainland Tactix	Central Pulse
Amelia Walmsley	Northern Comets/Mainland Tactix	Central Pulse
Vika Koloto	Northern Comets	Mainland Tactix
Kate Lloyd	NNL Mainland	Mainland Tactix
Kelera Nawai-Caucau	Central Pulse	Mainland Tactix
Monica Falkner	Northern Stars	Northern Mystics
Claire O'Brien	Northern Marvels	Northern Mystics
Holly Fowler	Waikato Bay of Plenty Magic	Northern Stars
Kayla Johnson		Northern Stars
Kate Burley	Northern Mystics	Southern Steel
Georgia Heffernan	Southern Blast	Southern Steel
Saviour Tui	Northern Mystics	Southern Steel
Ameliaranne Ekenasio	Central Pulse	Waikato Bay of Plenty Magic
Claire Kersten	Central Pulse	Waikato Bay of Plenty Magic
Oceane Maihi	Northern Stars	Waikato Bay of Plenty Magic
Bailey Mes	Northern Mystics	Waikato Bay of Plenty Magic
Katrina Rore^{(Note 2)}	maternity leave	Waikato Bay of Plenty Magic

Notes

- ^1 Temalisi Fakahokotau initially signed for Central Pulse but in January 2022 announced she would be taking a break from netball. However she subsequently joined Saracens Mavericks as a replacement player for the 2022 Netball Superleague season.
- ^2 Katrina Rore initially signed for Waikato Bay of Plenty Magic but subsequently missed the season due a second pregnancy.

== Head coaches and captains ==
Team	Head coach	Captain
Central Pulse	Yvette McCausland-Durie	Tiana Metuarau; Kelly Jury
Mainland Tactix	Marianne Delaney-Hoshek	Kimiora Poi
Northern Mystics	Helene Wilson	Sulu Fitzpatrick
Northern Stars	Kiri Wills	Maia Wilson
Southern Steel	Reinga Bloxham	Shannon Saunders
Waikato Bay of Plenty Magic	Mary-Jane Araroa	Samantha Winders

== Impact of COVID-19 pandemic ==
=== Matches cancelled ===
Just like the 2020 season, the 2022 season was impacted by the COVID-19 pandemic. Central Pulse were due to host the sixth edition of the official ANZ Premiership tournament at Te Wānanga o Raukawa in Otaki between 24 and 27 February. However, the tournament was cancelled after a change in COVID-19 alert levels. Pulse's Round 1 match against Northern Stars was cancelled following a Covid-19 outbreak in their squad. Their head coach Yvette McCausland-Durie also tested positive for Covid-19. Further matches were cancelled throughout the season, most notably in early April when six matches were cancelled across Rounds 4 and 5. Some cancelled matches were simply rescheduled and added to later rounds. However, the backlog of cancelled matches effectively created a Round 13.

=== Player pool ===
In order to reduce the number of cancelled matches, the ANZ Premiership created a free agent player pool that teams could use to recruit temporary replacements. Greer Sinclair subsequently played for four teams during the season. As well as played for Northern Comets in the National Netball League, she also played for Northern Stars, Northern Mystics and Waikato Bay of Plenty Magic in the ANZ Premiership. Another member of the pool, Storm Purvis came out of retirement to play for Stars. This saw her make her 100th senior league appearance.

== Regular season ==
=== Round 1 ===
Sun 13 Mar	Waikato Bay of Plenty Magic	46–43	Northern Mystics	Globox Arena
2.10pm	Ivana Rowland 26/30 (87%); Bailey Mes 10/11 (91%); Brooke Leaver 10/15 (67%)	Report; Stats	Filda Vui 26/32 (81%); Monica Falkner 17/17 (100%)

Sun 13 Mar	Mainland Tactix	54–71	Southern Steel	Christchurch Arena
4.10pm	Ellie Bird 32/36 (89%); Te Paea Selby-Rickit 18/22 (82%); Hannah Glen 4/7 (57%)	Report; Stats	George Fisher 47/50 (94%); Saviour Tui 17/20 (85%); Georgia Heffernan 7/9 (78%)

Mon 14 Mar	Northern Stars	^{(Note 3)}	Central Pulse	Pulman Arena
7.15pm		Report

=== Round 2 ===
Sat 19 Mar	Central Pulse	60–66	Northern Mystics	Te Rauparaha Arena
4.10pm	Aliyah Dunn 45/49 (92%); Tiana Metuarau 15/19 (79%)	Report; Stats	Grace Nweke 49/51 (96%); Monica Falkner 11/16 (69%); Filda Vui 6/7 (86%)

Sun 20 Mar	Mainland Tactix	52–57	Northern Stars	Cowles Stadium, Christchurch
2.10pm	Ellie Bird 34/37 (92%); Te Paea Selby-Rickit 18/22 (82%)	Report; Stats	Maia Wilson 34/38 (89%); Jamie Hume 23/30 (77%)

Sun 20 Mar	Central Pulse	57–41	Waikato Bay of Plenty Magic	Te Rauparaha Arena
4.10pm	Aliyah Dunn 41/45 (91%); Tiana Metuarau 14/16 (88%); Renee Matoe 2/2 (100%)	Report; Stats	Bailey Mes 19/23 (83%); Ivana Rowland 15/18 (83%); Ameliaranne Ekenasio 5/6 (83%); Martina Reekers 2/2 (100%)

Mon 21 Mar	Southern Steel	50–70	Northern Mystics	Stadium Southland
7.15pm	George Fisher 24/28 (86%); Saviour Tui 19/25 (76%); Georgia Heffernan 7/10 (70%)	Report; Stats	Grace Nweke 50/52 (96%); Monica Falkner 10/12 (83%); Filda Vui 10/11 (91%)

=== Round 3 ===
Sun 27 Mar	Northern Mystics	62–61	Central Pulse	The Trusts Arena
2.10pm	Grace Nweke 55/60 (92%); Filda Vui 4/6 (67%); Monica Falkner 3/8 (38%)	Report; Stats	Aliyah Dunn 38/41 (93%); Tiana Metuarau 23/30 (77%)

Sun 27 Mar	Southern Steel	71–62	Northern Stars	Stadium Southland
4.10pm	George Fisher 51/52 (98%); Saviour Tui 11/14 (79%); Georgia Heffernan 9/10 (90%)	Report; Stats	Maia Wilson 45/49 (92%); Jamie Hume 17/22 (77%); Amorangi Malesala 0/1 (0%)

Mon 28 Mar	Waikato Bay of Plenty Magic	54–61	Mainland Tactix	Trustpower Baypark Arena
7.15pm	Bailey Mes 32/37 (86%); Ivana Rowland 12/13 (92%); Ameliaranne Ekenasio 10/10 (100%)	Report; Stats	Ellie Bird 45/47 (96%); Te Paea Selby-Rickit 16/19 (84%)

=== Round 4 ===
Sat 2 Apr	Northern Stars	^{(Note 3)}	Mainland Tactix	The Trusts Arena
2.10pm		Report

Sat 2 Apr	Northern Mystics	67–59	Southern Steel	The Trusts Arena
4.10pm	Grace Nweke 52/61 (85%); Bailey Mes 6/9 (67%); Filda Vui 0/2 (0%)	Report	George Fisher 47/52 (90%); Tiana Metuarau 16/19 (84%)

Sun 3 Apr	Northern Mystics	^{(Note 3)}	Mainland Tactix	The Trusts Arena
2.10pm		Report

Sun 3 Apr	Waikato Bay of Plenty Magic	50–51	Central Pulse	Globox Arena
4.10pm	Bailey Mes 24/28 (86%); Ameliaranne Ekenasio 18/21 (86%); Ivana Rowland 8/10 (80%)	Report; Stats	Aliyah Dunn 37/40 (93%); Tiana Metuarau 14/17 (82%)

Mon 4 Apr	Northern Stars	^{(Note 3)}	Southern Steel	Pulman Arena
7.15pm		Report

=== Round 5 ===
Sat 9 Apr	Waikato Bay of Plenty Magic	^{(Note 3)}	Southern Steel	Energy Events Centre
4.10pm		Report

Sun 10 Apr	Mainland Tactix	^{(Note 3)}	Northern Mystics	Cowles Stadium, Christchurch
2.10pm		Report

Sun 10 Apr	Northern Stars	^{(Note 3)}	Waikato Bay of Plenty Magic	Pulman Arena
4.10pm		Report

Mon 11 Apr	Central Pulse	63–66	Southern Steel	TSB Bank Arena
7.15pm	Aliyah Dunn 52/53 (98%); Tiana Metuarau 11/12 (92%)	Report; Stats	George Fisher 48/50 (96%); Georgia Heffernan 15/16 (94%); Saviour Tui 3/7 (43%)

=== Round 6 ===
Sat 16 Apr	Mainland Tactix	51–63	Northern Stars	Christchurch Arena
4.10pm	Ellie Bird 33/35 (94%); Te Paea Selby-Rickit 18/23 (78%)	Report; Stats	Maia Wilson 37/44 (84%); Jamie Hume 37/44 (84%); Amorangi Malesala 12/19 (63%); Eseta Autagavaia 2/2 (100%)

Sun 17 Apr	Southern Steel	64–59	Northern Mystics	Stadium Southland
4.10pm	George Fisher 41/45 (91%); Saviour Tui 12/13 (92%); Georgia Heffernan 11/19 (58%)	Report; Stats	Grace Nweke 50/59 (85%); Filda Vui 9/13 (69%)

Mon 18 Apr	Waikato Bay of Plenty Magic	39–52	Central Pulse	Energy Events Centre
7.15pm	Ameliaranne Ekenasio 21/27 (78%); Brooke Leaver 10/10 (100%); Ivana Rowland 8/10 (80%)	Report; Stats	Aliyah Dunn 35/37 (95%); Tiana Metuarau 13/16 (81%); Amelia Walmsley 4/5 (80%)

Rescheduled Round 4 match

Wed 20 Apr	Northern Stars	56–48	Mainland Tactix	Pulman Arena
7.10pm	Maia Wilson 31/34 (91%); Jamie Hume 17/24 (71%); Amorangi Malesala 8/12 (67%)	Report; Stats	Ellie Bird 21/24 (88%); Te Paea Selby-Rickit 17/21 (81%); Hannah Glen 10/11 (91%)

=== Round 7 ===
Sat 23 Apr	Waikato Bay of Plenty Magic	^{(Note 3)}	Southern Steel	Globox Arena
4.10pm		Report

Sun 24 Apr	Central Pulse	58–41	Mainland Tactix	TSB Bank Arena
2.10pm	Aliyah Dunn 43/46 (93%); Tiana Metuarau 13/16 (81%); Amelia Walmsley 2/2 (100%)	Report; Stats	Ellie Bird 25/29 (86%); Te Paea Selby-Rickit 12/17 (71%); Vika Koloto 4/4 (100%)

Sun 24 Apr	Northern Mystics	68–44	Northern Stars	The Trusts Arena
4.10pm	Grace Nweke 59/66 (89%); Monica Falkner 5/7 (71%); Filda Vui 4/6 (67%)	Report; Stats	Amorangi Malesala 24/30 (80%); Maia Wilson 13/21 (62%); Jamie Hume 7/13 (54%)

Wed 27 Apr	Northern Stars	46–56	Central Pulse	Pulman Arena
7.15pm	Maia Wilson 26/28 (93%); Jamie Hume 14/20 (70%); Amorangi Malesala 6/9 (67%)	Report; Stats	Aliyah Dunn 37/39 (95%); Tiana Metuarau 19/25 (76%)

=== Round 8 ===
Sun 1 May	Central Pulse	46–47	Northern Stars	Fly Palmy Arena
4.10pm	Aliyah Dunn 29/31 (94%); Tiana Metuarau 17/21 (81%)	Report; Stats	Jamie Hume 24/32 (75%); Maia Wilson 23/29 (79%)

Mon 2 May	Northern Mystics	56–44	Waikato Bay of Plenty Magic	Eventfinda Stadium
7.15pm	Grace Nweke 47/50 (94%); Monica Falkner 6/11 (55%); Filda Vui 3/5 (60%)	Report; Stats	Bailey Mes 20/31 (65%); Ivana Rowland 20/24 (83%); Eseta Autagavaia 4/4 (100%)

Wed 4 May	Southern Steel	52–63	Mainland Tactix	Stadium Southland
7.10pm	George Fisher 33/36 (92%); Saviour Tui 11/14 (79%); Georgia Heffernan 8/10 (80%)	Report; Stats	Ellie Bird 49/53 (92%); Te Paea Selby-Rickit 14/20 (70%)

=== Round 9 ===
Sat 7 May	Northern Mystics	70–51	Mainland Tactix	Pulman Arena
2.10pm	Grace Nweke 45/49 (92%); Filda Vui 17/19 (89%); Monica Falkner 8/11 (73%)	Report; Stats	Ellie Bird 23/29 (79%); Te Paea Selby-Rickit 22/27 (81%); Hannah Glen 5/7 (71%); Vika Koloto 1/1 (100%)

Sat 7 May	Northern Stars	47–39	Waikato Bay of Plenty Magic	Pulman Arena
4.10pm	Maia Wilson 31/40 (78%); Jamie Hume 13/22 (59%); Amorangi Malesala 3/4 (75%)	Report; Stats	Bailey Mes 23/24 (96%); Ivana Rowland 11/17 (65%); Eseta Autagavaia 5/7 (71%)

Sun 8 May	Waikato Bay of Plenty Magic	48–51	Mainland Tactix	Pulman Arena
2.10pm	Bailey Mes 26/31 (84%); Ivana Rowland 13/16 (81%); Ameliaranne Ekenasio 9/11 (82%)	Report; Stats	Ellie Bird 28/34 (82%); Te Paea Selby-Rickit 21/26 (81%); Hannah Glen 2/4 (50%)

Sun 8 May	Northern Stars	51–54	Northern Mystics	Pulman Arena
4.10pm	Maia Wilson 20/28 (71%); Jamie Hume 17/24 (71%); Amorangi Malesala 14/16 (88%)	Report; Stats	Grace Nweke 49/55 (89%); Monica Falkner 3/6 (50%); Filda Vui 2/3 (67%)

Mon 9 May	Southern Steel	44–50	Central Pulse	Edgar Centre
7.15pm	George Fisher 29/34 (85%); Saviour Tui 14/16 (88%); Georgia Heffernan 1/4 (25%)	Report; Stats	Aliyah Dunn 36/37 (97%); Tiana Metuarau 14/19 (74%)

=== Round 10 ===
Sat 14 May	Waikato Bay of Plenty Magic	53–67	Northern Stars	Globox Arena
2.10pm	Ameliaranne Ekenasio 31/34 (91%); Bailey Mes 22/27 (81%)	Report; Stats	Maia Wilson 41/43 (95%); Jamie Hume 23/28 (82%); Amorangi Malesala 3/5 (60%)

Sat 14 May	Mainland Tactix	58–69	Northern Mystics	Christchurch Arena
	Ellie Bird 38/40 (95%); Te Paea Selby-Rickit 20/24 (83%)	Report; Stats	Grace Nweke 52/55 (95%); Monica Falkner 10/13 (77%); Filda Vui 7/12 (58%)

Sun 15 May	Mainland Tactix	61–56	Southern Steel	Christchurch Arena
2.10pm	Ellie Bird 43/44 (98%); Te Paea Selby-Rickit 18/20 (90%)	Report; Stats	George Fisher 41/46 (89%); Saviour Tui 8/11 (73%); Georgia Heffernan 7/11 (64%)

Sun 15 May	Central Pulse	44–49	Northern Stars	TSB Bank Arena
4.10pm	Aliyah Dunn 28/32 (88%); Tiana Metuarau 16/19 (84%)	Report; Stats	Maia Wilson 36/42 (86%); Amorangi Malesala 8/10 (80%); Jamie Hume 5/9 (56%)

Mon 16 May	Northern Mystics	47–48	Waikato Bay of Plenty Magic	The Trusts Arena
7.15pm	Filda Vui 29/34 (85%); Monica Falkner 16/19 (84%); Danielle Binks 2/3 (67%)	Report; Stats	Bailey Mes 29/39 (74%); Ameliaranne Ekenasio 19/26 (73%)

Wed 18 May	Waikato Bay of Plenty Magic	49–51	Southern Steel	Energy Events Centre
7.10pm	Ameliaranne Ekenasio 27/33 (82%); Bailey Mes 22/32 (69%)	Report; Stats	George Fisher 33/36 (92%); Saviour Tui 9/12 (75%); Georgia Heffernan 9/12 (75%)

=== Round 11 ===
Sat 21 May	Northern Mystics	49–54	Mainland Tactix	The Trusts Arena
2.10pm	Filda Vui 28/35 (80%); Monica Falkner 18/20 (90%); Grace Namana 3/4 (75%)	Report; Stats	Ellie Bird 34/35 (97%); Te Paea Selby-Rickit 20/22 (91%)

Sat 21 May	Southern Steel	49–59	Central Pulse	Stadium Southland
4.10pm	George Fisher 39/41 (95%); Georgia Heffernan 10/20 (50%); Kiana Pelasio 0/1 (0%)	Report; Stats	Aliyah Dunn 44/45 (98%); Tiana Metuarau 14/16 (88%); Amelia Walmsley 1/1 (100%)

Sun 22 May	Northern Stars	59–38	Northern Mystics	Pulman Arena
2.10pm	Maia Wilson 37/47 (79%); Jamie Hume 18/28 (64%); Amorangi Malesala 4/7 (57%)	Report; Stats	Monica Falkner 14/17 (82%); Filda Vui 14/19 (74%); Grace Namana 9/11 (82%); Phoenix Karaka 1/1 (100%); Danielle Binks 0/1 (0%)

Sun 22 May	Southern Steel	68–57	Waikato Bay of Plenty Magic	Stadium Southland
4.10pm	George Fisher 50/51 (98%); Georgia Heffernan 18/20 (90%)	Report; Stats	Bailey Mes 31/36 (86%); Ameliaranne Ekenasio 26/29 (90%)

Mon 23 May	Central Pulse	62–49	Mainland Tactix	TSB Bank Arena
7.15pm	Aliyah Dunn 43/48 (90%); Tiana Metuarau 17/20 (85%); Renee Matoe 1/1 (100%); Amelia Walmsley 1/1 (100%)	Report; Stats	Ellie Bird 39/45 (87%); Te Paea Selby-Rickit 10/12 (83%)

=== Round 12 ===
Sat 28 May	Northern Mystics	^{(Note 3)}	Central Pulse	The Trusts Arena
4.10pm		Report

Sun 29 May	Southern Steel	60–62	Northern Stars	Stadium Southland
2.10pm	George Fisher 45/46 (98%); Georgia Heffernan 13/15 (87%); Saviour Tui 2/3 (67%)	Report; Stats	Maia Wilson 44/48 (92%); Jamie Hume 18/24 (75%)

Sun 29 May	Mainland Tactix	51–57	Waikato Bay of Plenty Magic	Christchurch Arena
4.10pm	Ellie Bird 34/39 (87%); Te Paea Selby-Rickit 17/19 (89%)	Report; Stats	Ameliaranne Ekenasio 33/36 (92%); Bailey Mes 24/40 (60%)

Mon 30 May	Mainland Tactix	43–51	Central Pulse	Christchurch Arena
7.15pm	Hannah Glen 19/23 (83%); Te Paea Selby-Rickit 18/22 (82%); Ellie Bird 6/6 (100%)	Report; Stats	Aliyah Dunn 29/33 (88%); Tiana Metuarau 22/26 (85%)

=== Round 13 ===
Originally only twelve rounds of matches were scheduled. However, the backlog of cancelled matches effectively created a Round 13.

Rescheduled matches

Wed 1 Jun	Northern Stars	58–54	Waikato Bay of Plenty Magic	Pulman Arena
7.10pm	Maia Wilson 42/47 (89%); Amorangi Malesala 13/18 (72%); Jamie Hume 3/10 (30%)	Report; Stats	Ameliaranne Ekenasio 34/41 (83%); Bailey Mes 20/24 (83%)

Thur 2 Jun	Northern Stars	68–49	Southern Steel	Pulman Arena
7.10pm	Maia Wilson 51/55 (93%); Jamie Hume 15/17 (88%); Amorangi Malesala 2/4 (50%)	Report; Stats	George Fisher 33/35 (94%); Saviour Tui 9/13 (69%); Georgia Heffernan 7/9 (78%)

Fri 3 Jun	Northern Mystics	40–58	Central Pulse	The Trusts Arena
7.10pm	Grace Namana 32/37 (86%); Monica Falkner 5/6 (83%); Filda Vui 2/2 (100%); Phoenix Karaka 1/3 (33%)	Report; Stats	Aliyah Dunn 37/41 (90%); Tiana Metuarau 17/21 (81%); Amelia Walmsley 3/4 (75%); Renee Matoe 1/2 (50%)

Sat 4 Jun	Waikato Bay of Plenty Magic	54–43	Southern Steel	Globox Arena
4.10pm	Bailey Mes 28/33 (85%); Ameliaranne Ekenasio 25/30 (83%); Ivana Rowland 1/2 (50%); Eseta Autagavaia 0/1 (0%)	Report; Stats	George Fisher 24/26 (92%); Saviour Tui 13/13 (100%); Georgia Heffernan 6/9 (67%)

Notes

- ^3 Matches postponed under the ANZ Premiership's Covid-19 Match Postponement Policy.

== Final standings ==
2022 ANZ Premiership ladder
Pos	Team	P	W	D	L	GF	GA	GD	G%	BP	Pts
1	Central Pulse	15	10	0	5	828	732	96	113.1%	4	34
2	Northern Stars	15	11	0	4	836	783	53	106.8%	1	34
3	Northern Mystics	15	9	0	6	858	807	51	106.3%	4	31
4	Southern Steel	15	6	0	9	853	898	-45	95%	2	20
5	Waikato Bay of Plenty Magic	15	4	0	11	733	803	-70	91.3%	4	16
6	Mainland Tactix	15	5	0	10	788	873	-85	90.3%	1	16
Last updated: 12 August 2022

Qualified for Grand final
Qualified for Elimination final

== Finals series ==
=== Elimination final ===
8 June 2022	Northern Stars	63–57	Northern Mystics	Pulman Arena	Sky Sport
8 June 2022	Scoring by quarter: 16–10, 33–23, 48–43, 63–57			Pulman Arena	Sky Sport
8 June 2022	Maia Wilson 42/44 (95%); Jamie Hume 21/25 (84%)		Grace Nweke 45/49 (92%); Grace Namana 8/8 (100%); Monica Falkner 4/6 (67%)	Pulman Arena	Sky Sport

=== Grand final ===
12 June 2022	Central Pulse	56–37	Northern Stars	TSB Bank Arena	Sky Sport
12 June 2022	Scoring by quarter: 15–6, 26–15, 42–26, 56–37			TSB Bank Arena	Sky Sport
12 June 2022	Aliyah Dunn 44/47 (94%); Tiana Metuarau 11/13 (85%); Amelia Walmsley 1/2 (50%); Renee Matoe 0/2 (0%)		Maia Wilson 21/25 (84%); Amorangi Malesala 13/17 (76%); Jamie Hume 3/4 (75%)	TSB Bank Arena	Sky Sport

== Awards ==
=== New Zealand Netball Awards ===
Award	Winner	Team
Dame Lois Muir Supreme Award	Grace Nweke	Northern Mystics
Dame Lois Muir Supreme Award	Kelly Jury	Central Pulse
ANZ Premiership Coach of the Year	Yvette McCausland-Durie	Central Pulse
ANZ Premiership Player of the Year	Kelly Jury	Central Pulse

Notes

- ^4 Grace Nweke and Kelly Jury shared Dame Lois Muir Supreme Award.

=== ANZ Premiership Awards ===
Award	Winner	Team
Grand Final MVP	Kelly Jury	Central Pulse

=== Team of the season ===
Brendon Egan selected Stuff's team of the season.

Stuff Super Seven

Position	Player	Team
GS	Grace Nweke	Northern Mystics
GA	Tiana Metuarau	Central Pulse
WA	Gina Crampton	Northern Stars
C	Mila Reuelu-Buchanan	Northern Stars
WD	Maddy Gordon	Central Pulse
GD	Elle Temu	Northern Stars
GK	Kelly Jury	Central Pulse

Bench

Positions	Player	Team
GS	Maia Wilson	Northern Stars
WA, C	Whitney Souness	Central Pulse
WD, C, WA	Kate Heffernan	Southern Steel
GD, WD, GK	Karin Burger	Mainland Tactix
GK, GD, WD	Anna Harrison	Northern Stars
