= 2021 ANZ Premiership season =

Netball league season

- League: ANZ Premiership
- Sport: Netball
- Duration: 19 April – 8 August 2021
- Teams: 6
- TV partner: Sky Sport (New Zealand)
- Minor Premiers: Northern Mystics
- Season MVP: Karin Burger (Mainland Tactix)
- Top scorer: Grace Nweke (Northern Mystics)

Finals
- Champions: Northern Mystics
- Runners-up: Mainland Tactix

ANZ Premiership seasons
- ← 2020 2022 →

The 2021 ANZ Premiership season was the fifth season of Netball New Zealand's ANZ Premiership. With a team coached by Helene Wilson, captained by Sulu Fitzpatrick and featuring Ama Agbeze, Bailey Mes and Grace Nweke, Northern Mystics won their first ever premiership. Mystics finished the regular season as minor premiers, above Southern Steel and Mainland Tactix. In the Elimination final, Tactix defeated Steel 54–49. In the Grand final, Mystics defeated Tactix 61–59.

== Transfers ==
Player	2020 team	2021 team
Paris Lokotui	Central Manawa	Central Pulse
Parris Mason	Central Manawa	Central Pulse
Kelera Nawai		Central Pulse
Whitney Souness	Waikato Bay of Plenty Magic	Central Pulse
Karin Burger	Central Pulse	Mainland Tactix
Ama Agbeze		Northern Mystics
Kate Burley	Northern Stars	Northern Mystics
Fa'amu Ioane	Northern Stars	Northern Mystics
Gina Crampton	Southern Steel	Northern Stars
Monica Falkner	Waikato Bay of Plenty Magic	Northern Stars
Anna Harrison	retirement	Northern Stars
Amorangi Malesala		Northern Stars
Elle Temu	Central Pulse	Northern Stars
George Fisher	Saracens Mavericks	Southern Steel
Tiana Metuarau	Central Pulse	Southern Steel
Rene Savai'inaea	Central Pulse	Southern Steel
Caitlin Bassett	Giants Netball	Waikato Bay of Plenty Magic
Georgie Edgecombe	NNL Waikato Bay of Plenty	Waikato Bay of Plenty Magic
Temalisi Fakahokotau	Mainland Tactix	Waikato Bay of Plenty Magic
Grace Kara	Northern Stars	Waikato Bay of Plenty Magic
Tori Kolose	NNL Waikato Bay of Plenty	Waikato Bay of Plenty Magic
Chiara Semple	London Pulse	Waikato Bay of Plenty Magic

== Head coaches and captains ==
Team	Head coach	Captain
Central Pulse	Gail Parata	Claire Kersten
Mainland Tactix	Marianne Delaney-Hoshek	Jane Watson
Northern Mystics	Helene Wilson	Sulu Fitzpatrick
Northern Stars	Kiri Wills	Maia Wilson
Southern Steel	Reinga Bloxham	Shannon Saunders
Waikato Bay of Plenty Magic	Amigene Metcalfe	Samantha Winders

== Pre-season ==
=== Otaki tournament ===
Central Pulse hosted the official ANZ Premiership tournament at Te Wānanga o Raukawa in Otaki between 26 and 28 March. All six ANZ Premiership teams took part. With two wins and a draw, Mainland Tactix were the only team not to lose a match.

Day 1

Fri 26 Mar	Central Pulse	39–55	Mainland Tactix
10:00am

Fri 26 Mar	Waikato Bay of Plenty Magic	40–32	Northern Mystics
12.00pm

Fri 26 Mar	Northern Stars	60–34	Southern Steel
5:00pm

Fri 26 Mar	Central Pulse	57–46	Waikato Bay of Plenty Magic
6.30pm

Day 2

Sat 27 Mar	Mainland Tactix	64–56	Northern Mystics
9:00am

Sat 27 Mar	Northern Stars	47–27	Waikato Bay of Plenty Magic
11:00am

Sat 27 Mar	Northern Mystics	66–57	Southern Steel
5:00pm

Sat 27 Mar	Central Pulse	61–53	Northern Stars
6.30pm

Day 3

Sun 28 Mar	Waikato Bay of Plenty Magic	69–49	Southern Steel
10:00am

Sun 28 Mar	Mainland Tactix	49–49	Northern Stars
12:00pm

Sun 28 Mar	Central Pulse	55–53	Northern Mystics
2:00 pm

== Regular season ==
=== Round 1 ===
Sun 18 Apr	Central Pulse	53–57	Northern Stars	Fly Palmy Arena
4.15pm	Aliyah Dunn 36/39 (92%); Te Amo Amaru-Tibble 17/19 (89%)	Report	Maia Wilson 44/50 (88%); Jamie Hume 10/12 (83%); Monica Falkner 3/4 (75%)

Sun 18 Apr	Southern Steel	54–36	Mainland Tactix	Stadium Southland
6.15pm	George Fisher 46/49 (94%); Tiana Metuarau 8/14 (57%)	Report; Stats	Ellie Bird 22/27 (81%); Jess Prosser 7/9 (78%); Hannah Glen 7/12 (58%)

Mon 19 Apr	Northern Mystics	60–64	Waikato Bay of Plenty Magic	The Trusts Arena
7.15pm	Grace Nweke 36/41 (88%); Bailey Mes 6/9 (67%); Filda Vui 5/6 (83%)	Report; Stats	Caitlin Bassett 36/41 (88%); Chiara Semple 16/22 (73%); Khiarna Williams 12/14 (86%)

=== Round 2 ===
Sat 24 Apr	Northern Mystics	64–58	Southern Steel	Eventfinda Stadium
5.15pm	Grace Nweke 56/60 (93%); Bailey Mes 8/9 (89%)	Report; Stats	George Fisher 42/42 (100%); Tiana Metuarau 16/21 (76%)

Sun 25 Apr	Northern Stars	57–43	Mainland Tactix	Pulman Arena
4.15pm	Maia Wilson 40/45 (89%); Jamie Hume 17/20 (85%)	Report; Stats	Ellie Bird 31/34 (91%); Jess Prosser 11/14 (79%); Hannah Glen 1/2 (50%)

Sun 25 Apr	Waikato Bay of Plenty Magic	47–59	Central Pulse	Claudelands Arena
6.15pm	Caitlin Bassett 23/26 (88%); Khiarna Williams 18/20 (90%); Chiara Semple 6/6 (100%)	Report	Aliyah Dunn 41/46 (89%); Te Amo Amaru-Tibble 16/19 (84%); Whitney Souness 2/3 (67%); Ivana Rowland 0/1 (0%)

=== Round 3 ===
Sun 2 May	Southern Steel	56–52	Central Pulse	Stadium Southland
4.15pm	George Fisher 48/52 (92%); Tiana Metuarau 8/8 (100%)	Report	Aliyah Dunn 38/39 (97%); Te Amo Amaru-Tibble 14/18 (78%)

Sun 2 May	Waikato Bay of Plenty Magic	51–55	Northern Stars	Trustpower Baypark Arena
6.15pm	Caitlin Bassett 21/23 (91%); Khiarna Williams 20/21 (95%); Chiara Semple 10/13 (77%)	Report; Stats	Maia Wilson 42/53 (79%); Jamie Hume 13/21 (62%)

Mon 3 May	Northern Mystics	53–52	Mainland Tactix	The Trusts Arena
7.15pm	Grace Nweke 49/56 (88%); Bailey Mes 4/8 (50%)	Report; Stats	Ellie Bird 39/45 (87%); Te Paea Selby-Rickit 10/18 (56%); Jess Prosser 3/6 (50%)

=== Round 4 ===
Sun 9 May	Northern Stars	59–45	Southern Steel	Pulman Arena
4.15pm	Maia Wilson 33/43 (77%); Jamie Hume 22/31 (71%); Amorangi Malesala 4/4 (100%)	Report; Stats	George Fisher 34/37 (92%); Tiana Metuarau 11/19 (58%)

Sun 9 May	Mainland Tactix	63–59	Waikato Bay of Plenty Magic	Christchurch Arena
6.15pm	Ellie Bird 54/55 (98%); Te Paea Selby-Rickit 9/10 (90%); Jess Prosser 0/1 (0%)	Report; Stats	Caitlin Bassett 45/48 (94%); Chiara Semple 5/5 (100%); Khiarna Williams 9/14 (64%)	Attendance: 3,000

Mon 10 May	Central Pulse	47–58	Northern Mystics	TSB Bank Arena
7.15pm	Aliyah Dunn 27/34 (79%); Te Amo Amaru-Tibble 18/24 (75%); Whitney Souness 2/4 (50%)	Report; Stats	Grace Nweke 51/55 (93%); Bailey Mes 5/7 (71%); Saviour Tui 2/3 (67%)

=== Round 5 ===
Sun 16 May	Central Pulse	52–56	Southern Steel	Te Rauparaha Arena
4.15pm	Aliyah Dunn 39/40 (98%); Te Amo Amaru-Tibble 13/14 (93%)	Report	George Fisher 44/49 (90%); Tiana Metuarau 12/15 (80%)

Mon 17 May	Mainland Tactix	64–63	Northern Mystics	Christchurch Arena
6.15pm	Ellie Bird 44/53 (83%); Te Paea Selby-Rickit 20/29 (69%)	Report; Stats	Grace Nweke 59/64 (92%); Bailey Mes 4/9 (44%)

Mon 17 May	Waikato Bay of Plenty Magic	49–61	Northern Stars	Trustpower Baypark Arena
8.15pm	Chiara Semple 19/23 (83%); Khiarna Williams 19/23 (83%); Caitlin Bassett 11/12 (92%)	Report; Stats	Maia Wilson 43/51 (84%); Jamie Hume 18/22 (82%); Amorangi Malesala 0/1 (0%)

=== Round 6 ===
Sun 23 May	Northern Stars	44–57	Central Pulse	Pulman Arena
4.15pm	Maia Wilson 23/29 (79%); Jamie Hume 13/16 (81%); Amorangi Malesala 8/12 (67%)	Report	Aliyah Dunn 35/39 (90%); Te Amo Amaru-Tibble 22/27 (81%)

Mon 24 May	Southern Steel	50–60	Mainland Tactix	Stadium Southland
6.15pm	George Fisher 42/49 (86%); Tiana Metuarau 8/10 (80%)	Report; Stats	Ellie Bird 46/48 (96%); Te Paea Selby-Rickit 14/19 (74%)

Mon 24 May	Waikato Bay of Plenty Magic	59–67	Northern Mystics	Trustpower Baypark Arena
8.15pm	Caitlin Bassett 26/28 (93%); Khiarna Williams 30/36 (83%); Chiara Semple 3/3 (100%)	Report; Stats	Grace Nweke 47/55 (85%); Bailey Mes 8/13 (62%); Filda Vui 12/14 (86%)

=== Round 7 ===
Sun 30 May	Northern Mystics	58–63	Southern Steel	The Trusts Arena
4.00pm	Grace Nweke 52/61 (85%); Bailey Mes 6/9 (67%); Filda Vui 0/2 (0%)	Report; Stats	George Fisher 47/52 (90%); Tiana Metuarau 16/19 (84%)

Sun 30 May	Central Pulse	64–53	Waikato Bay of Plenty Magic	TSB Bank Arena
6.15pm	Aliyah Dunn 42/46 (91%); Te Amo Amaru-Tibble 22/25 (88%)	Report	Caitlin Bassett 47/55 (85%); Grace Kara 6/14 (43%)

Mon 31 May	Northern Stars	57–56	Mainland Tactix	Pulman Arena
7.15pm	Maia Wilson 38/40 (95%); Jamie Hume 19/25 (76%)	Report; Stats	Ellie Bird 45/49 (92%); Te Paea Selby-Rickit 10/14 (71%); Hannah Glen 1/1 (100%)

=== Round 8 ===
Sat 5 Jun	Mainland Tactix	55–52	Central Pulse	Christchurch Arena
5.15pm	Ellie Bird 46/57 (81%); Te Paea Selby-Rickit 9/14 (64%)	Report	Aliyah Dunn 47/54 (87%); Whitney Souness 5/9 (56%)

Sun 6 Jun	Southern Steel	59–58	Waikato Bay of Plenty Magic	Edgar Centre
4.15pm	George Fisher 50/54 (93%); Tiana Metuarau 9/10 (90%)	Report; Stats	Caitlin Bassett 39/41 (95%); Chiara Semple 19/20 (95%)

Sun 6 Jun	Northern Mystics	63–60	Northern Stars	The Trusts Arena
6.15pm	Grace Nweke 60/64 (94%); Bailey Mes 3/3 (100%)	Report; Stats	Maia Wilson 34/38 (89%); Jamie Hume 10/15 (67%); Amorangi Malesala 16/17 (94%)

=== Round 9 ===
Sun 13 Jun	Northern Stars	55–53	Central Pulse	Pulman Arena
6.15pm	Maia Wilson 37/45 (82%); Jamie Hume 18/21 (86%)	Report	Aliyah Dunn 39/46 (85%); Te Amo Amaru-Tibble 14/17 (82%)

Mon 14 Jun	Waikato Bay of Plenty Magic	63–68	Northern Mystics	Claudelands Arena
	Caitlin Bassett 36/41 (88%); Chiara Semple 17/20 (85%); Khiarna Williams 10/14 (71%)	Report; Stats	Grace Nweke 57/61 (93%); Filda Vui 8/11 (73%); Bailey Mes 3/5 (60%)

Mon 14 Jun	Mainland Tactix	45–47	Southern Steel	Trafalgar Centre
8.15pm	Te Paea Selby-Rickit 18/20 (90%); Amelia Walmsley 16/19 (84%); Kate Grant 11/16 (69%)	Report; Stats	George Fisher 40/44 (91%); Tiana Metuarau 7/7 (100%)

=== Round 10 ===
Sat 19 Jun	Southern Steel	43–53	Northern Stars	Edgar Centre
4.15pm	George Fisher 22/32 (69%); Tiana Metuarau 19/23 (83%); Kiana Pelasio 2/6 (33%)	Report; Stats	Maia Wilson 38/47 (81%); Jamie Hume 13/19 (68%); Amorangi Malesala 2/3 (67%)

Sun 20 Jun	Northern Mystics	64–51	Central Pulse	The Trusts Arena
2.15 pm	Grace Nweke 54/63 (86%); Bailey Mes 2/9 (22%); Saviour Tui 2/3 (67%)	Report; Stats	Aliyah Dunn 31/39 (79%); Te Amo Amaru-Tibble 16/20 (80%); Whitney Souness 4/7 (57%)

Mon 21 Jun	Mainland Tactix	68–51	Waikato Bay of Plenty Magic	Trafalgar Centre
7.15pm	Ellie Bird 47/58 (81%); Te Paea Selby-Rickit 19/23 (83%); Amelia Walmsley 2/2 (100%)	Report; Stats	Caitlin Bassett 32/33 (97%); Khiarna Williams 12/13 (92%); Chiara Semple 7/10 (70%)

=== Round 11 ===
Sun 27 Jun	Central Pulse	^{(Note 1)}	Mainland Tactix	Te Rauparaha Arena
4.15pm

Sun 27 Jun	Northern Stars	57–65	Northern Mystics	Pulman Arena
6.15pm	Maia Wilson 35/41 (85%); Amorangi Malesala 22/27 (81%)	Report; Stats	Grace Nweke 55/59 (93%); Bailey Mes 3/4 (75%); Filda Vui 7/8 (88%)

Mon 28 Jun	Southern Steel	65–50	Waikato Bay of Plenty Magic	Stadium Southland
7.15pm	Grace Namana 35/38 (92%); Tiana Metuarau 29/30 (97%); Kiana Pelasio 1/3 (33%)	Report; Stats	Caitlin Bassett 21/22 (95%); Khiarna Williams 18/20 (90%); Chiara Semple 11/16 (69%)

=== Round 12 ===
Sun 4 Jul	Northern Mystics	69–61	Northern Stars	The Trusts Arena
4.15pm	Grace Nweke 54/65 (83%); Filda Vui 11/14 (79%); Bailey Mes 4/9 (44%)	Report; Stats	Maia Wilson 40/46 (87%); Amorangi Malesala 20/33 (61%); Monica Falkner 1/1 (100%)

Sun 4 Jul	Mainland Tactix	47–34	Central Pulse	Trafalgar Centre
6.15pm	Ellie Bird 31/40 (78%); Te Paea Selby-Rickit 16/23 (70%)	Report	Aliyah Dunn 21/22 (95%); Ivana Rowland 11/13 (85%); Te Amo Amaru-Tibble 2/4 (50%)

Mon 5 Jul	Waikato Bay of Plenty Magic	54–56	Southern Steel	Claudelands Arena
7.15pm	Caitlin Bassett 34/35 (97%); Khiarna Williams 20/23 (87%)	Report; Stats	Grace Namana 24/28 (86%); George Fisher 17/19 (89%); Tiana Metuarau 15/20 (75%)

=== Round 13 ===
Fri 9 Jul	Central Pulse	49–52	Mainland Tactix	Te Rauparaha Arena
	Aliyah Dunn 35/38 (92%); Te Amo Amaru-Tibble 12/18 (67%); Ivana Rowland 2/2 (100%)	Report	Ellie Bird 41/44 (93%); Te Paea Selby-Rickit 11/14 (79%)

Sun 11 Jul	Central Pulse	55–51	Waikato Bay of Plenty Magic	TSB Arena
4.15pm	Aliyah Dunn 41/44 (93%); Te Amo Amaru-Tibble 14/17 (82%)	Report	Caitlin Bassett 31/36 (86%); Khiarna Williams 20/23 (87%)

Sun 11 Jul	Southern Steel	61–58	Northern Mystics	Stadium Southland
6.15pm	George Fisher 39/41 (95%); Tiana Metuarau 22/46 (48%)	Report; Stats	Grace Nweke 50/57 (88%); Filda Vui 6/6 (100%); Bailey Mes 2/3 (67%)

Mon 12 Jul	Mainland Tactix	52–39	Northern Stars	Christchurch Arena
7.15pm	Ellie Bird 44/45 (98%); Te Paea Selby-Rickit 8/14 (57%)	Report; Stats	Jamie Hume 15/20 (75%); Maia Wilson 8/16 (50%); Monica Falkner 8/9 (89%); Amorangi Malesala 8/11 (73%)

=== Round 14 ===
Sun 18 Jul	Waikato Bay of Plenty Magic	47–49	Mainland Tactix	Energy Events Centre
4.15pm	Caitlin Bassett 40/42 (95%); Khiarna Williams 7/12 (58%)	Report; Stats	Ellie Bird 38/42 (90%); Te Paea Selby-Rickit 10/17 (59%); Amelia Walmsley 1/1 (100%)

Sun 18 Jul	Central Pulse	54–56	Northern Mystics	TSB Bank Arena
6.15pm	Aliyah Dunn 31/36 (86%); Te Amo Amaru-Tibble 18/26 (69%); Ivana Rowland 5/10 (50%)	Report; Stats	Grace Nweke 52/61 (85%); Filda Vui 2/3 (67%); Bailey Mes 2/5 (40%)

Mon 19 Jul	Northern Stars	45–46	Southern Steel	Pulman Arena
7.15pm	Jamie Hume 30/38 (79%); Maia Wilson 11/21 (52%); Monica Falkner 4/5 (80%)	Report; Stats	George Fisher 33/34 (97%); Tiana Metuarau 13/17 (76%)

=== Round 15 ===
Sat 24 Jul	Southern Steel	59–57	Central Pulse	Stadium Southland
5.15pm	George Fisher 42/45 (93%); Tiana Metuarau 17/21 (81%)	Report	Aliyah Dunn 36/39 (92%); Te Amo Amaru-Tibble 21/21 (100%)

Sun 25 Jul	Mainland Tactix	59–63	Northern Mystics	Christchurch Arena
4.15pm	Ellie Bird 42/44 (95%); Te Paea Selby-Rickit 17/25 (68%)	Report; Stats	Grace Nweke 49/51 (96%); Filda Vui 11/13 (85%); Saviour Tui 2/2 (100%); Bailey Mes 1/1 (100%)

Mon 26 Jul	Northern Stars	65–46	Waikato Bay of Plenty Magic	Pulman Arena
7.15pm	Jamie Hume 26/35 (74%); Monica Falkner 20/28 (71%); Maia Wilson 17/29 (59%)	Report; Stats	Caitlin Bassett 32/35 (91%); Chiara Semple 12/15 (80%); Khiarna Williams 2/4 (50%)

Notes

- ^1 The Round 11 match between Central Pulse and Mainland Tactix was postponed after a change in COVID-19 alert levels. The match was rescheduled for Friday, 9 July.

== Final standings ==
2021 ANZ Premiership ladder
Pos	Team	P	W	D	L	GF	GA	GD	G%	BP	Pts
1	Northern Mystics	15	11	0	4	929	873	56	106.4%	4	37
2	Southern Steel	15	11	0	4	818	801	17	102.1%	0	33
3	Mainland Tactix	15	9	0	6	801	775	26	103.4%	4	31
4	Northern Stars	15	9	0	6	825	791	34	104.3%	2	29
5	Central Pulse	15	4	0	11	789	810	-21	97.4%	8	20
6	Waikato Bay of Plenty Magic	15	1	0	14	802	914	-112	87.7%	7	10
Last updated: 9 August 2022

Qualified for Grand final
Qualified for Elimination final

== Finals Series ==
=== Elimination final ===
Sun 1 Aug	Southern Steel	49–54	Mainland Tactix	Stadium Southland	Sky Sport
Sun 1 Aug	Scoring by quarter: 13–15, 18–29, 32–41, 49–54			Stadium Southland	Sky Sport
Sun 1 Aug	George Fisher 39/41 (95%); Tiana Metuarau 10/13 (77%)		Ellie Bird 39/41 (95%); Te Paea Selby-Rickit 15/20 (75%)	Stadium Southland	Sky Sport

=== Grand final ===
Sun 8 Aug	Stats	Northern Mystics	61–59	Mainland Tactix	Spark Arena; Attendance: 5,000	SKYSport
Sun 8 Aug	Stats	Scoring by quarter: 17–14, 33–28, 48–46, 61–59			Spark Arena; Attendance: 5,000	SKYSport
Sun 8 Aug	Stats	Grace Nweke 58/62 (94%); Filda Vui 2/3 (67%); Bailey Mes 1/1 (100%)		Ellie Bird 38/44 (86%); Te Paea Selby-Rickit 21/39 (54%)	Spark Arena; Attendance: 5,000	SKYSport

== Award winners ==
=== New Zealand Netball Awards ===
Award	Winner	Team
Dame Lois Muir Supreme Award	Sulu Fitzpatrick	Northern Mystics
ANZ Premiership Coach of the Year	Helene Wilson	Northern Mystics
ANZ Premiership Player of the Year	Karin Burger	Mainland Tactix

=== ANZ Premiership Awards ===
Award	Winner	Team
Grand Final MVP	Peta Toeava	Northern Mystics

== Season statistics ==
Goal Shooters (by Goals Scored)
Pos.	Player	Team	Goals (%)
1	Grace Nweke	Northern Mystics	852/951 (90%)
2	Ellie Bird	Mainland Tactix	647/726 (89%)
3	George Fisher	Southern Steel	585/640 (91%)
4	Aliyah Dunn	Central Pulse	539/601 (90%)
5	Maia Wilson	Northern Stars	483/594 (81%)
6	Caitlin Bassett	Waikato Bay of Plenty Magic	474/518 (92%)

Circle Feeds
Pos.	Player	Team	CF
1	Peta Toeava	Northern Mystics	662
2	Gina Crampton	Northern Stars	642
3	Shannon Saunders	Southern Steel	583
4	Kimiora Poi	Mainland Tactix	469
5	Samantha Winders	Waikato Bay of Plenty Magic	465
6	Whitney Souness	Central Pulse	446

Deflections
Pos.	Player	Team	Def
1	Jane Watson	Mainland Tactix	78
2	Anna Harrison	Northern Stars	66
3	Taneisha Fifita	Southern Steel	63
3	Erena Mikaere	Waikato Bay of Plenty Magic	63
5	Sulu Fitzpatrick	Northern Mystics	58
6	Kelly Jury	Central Pulse	51

Intercepts
Pos.	Player	Team	Inter.
1	Karin Burger	Mainland Tactix	48
2	Anna Harrison	Northern Stars	39
3	Taneisha Fifita	Southern Steel	25
3	Kelera Nawai-Caucau	Central Pulse	25
5	Sulu Fitzpatrick	Northern Mystics	21
6	Erena Mikaere	Waikato Bay of Plenty Magic	11
6	Holly Fowler	Waikato Bay of Plenty Magic	11

Rebounds
Pos.	Player	Team	Reb.
1	Sulu Fitzpatrick	Northern Mystics	30
2	Karin Burger	Mainland Tactix	27
3	Kelera Nawai-Caucau	Central Pulse	22
4	Taneisha Fifita	Southern Steel	19
5	Elle Temu	Northern Stars	18
6	Temalisi Fakahokotau	Waikato Bay of Plenty Magic	14
