= 2018 Constellation Cup =

International netball series

Tournament details
- Host countries: Australia; New Zealand
- Dates: 7–18 October 2018

Final positions
- Champions: Australia (8th title)
- Runners-up: New Zealand

Tournament statistics
- Matches played: 4
- Top scorer(s): Maria Folau; 125/142 (88%)

The 2018 Constellation Cup was the 9th Constellation Cup series played between Australia and New Zealand. The series featured four netball test matches, played in October 2018. The Australia team was coached by Lisa Alexander and captained by Caitlin Bassett. New Zealand were coached by Noeline Taurua and captained by Laura Langman. Australia won the series 3–1.

== Squads ==
=== Australia ===
Australia roster
Players
Coaches

Name	Pos	DOB	Height	Club	Nat	Caps
Caitlin Bassett (c)	GS	23 May 1988 (aged 30)	1.96 m (6 ft 5 in)	Giants Netball
April Brandley	GK, GD	19 April 1990 (aged 28)	1.85 m (6 ft 1 in)	Collingwood Magpies
Kelsey Browne	WA, C	17 January 1992 (aged 26)	1.68 m (5 ft 6 in)	Collingwood Magpies
Courtney Bruce	GD, GA	8 December 1993 (aged 24)	1.90 m (6 ft 3 in)	West Coast Fever
Emily Mannix	GK, GD	16 April 1994 (aged 24)	1.88 m (6 ft 2 in)	Melbourne Vixens
Kate Moloney	C, WD	8 January 1993 (aged 25)	1.76 m (5 ft 9 in)	Melbourne Vixens
Jamie-Lee Price	WD, C	10 January 1996 (aged 22)	1.79 m (5 ft 10 in)	Giants Netball
Gabi Simpson (vc)	WD, GD, C	17 October 1992 (aged 25)	1.76 m (5 ft 9 in)	Queensland Firebirds
Caitlin Thwaites	GS, GA	29 December 1986 (aged 31)	1.88 m (6 ft 2 in)	Collingwood Magpies
Gretel Tippett	GA, GS	3 July 1993 (aged 25)	1.91 m (6 ft 3 in)	Queensland Firebirds
Liz Watson	C, WA	30 March 1994 (aged 24)	1.78 m (5 ft 10 in)	Melbourne Vixens
Jo Weston	GD, WD, GK	14 February 1994 (aged 24)	1.88 m (6 ft 2 in)	Melbourne Vixens
Stephanie Wood	GA, WA	28 November 1991 (aged 26)	1.75 m (5 ft 9 in)	Sunshine Coast Lightning

Head coach

- Lisa Alexander

Notes

- (c) – Captain
- (cc) – Co-captain
- (vc) – Vice-captain
- – Injury / maternity leave
- (TRP) – Temporary Replacement Player

=== New Zealand ===
New Zealand roster
Players
Coaches

Name	Pos	DOB	Height	Club	Nat	Caps
Gina Crampton	WA, C	7 December 1991 (aged 26)	1.74 m (5 ft 9 in)	Southern Steel
Aliyah Dunn	GS, GA	19 October 1999 (aged 18)	1.90 m (6 ft 3 in)	Central Pulse
Sulu Fitzpatrick	GD, GK	20 August 1992 (aged 26)	1.88 m (6 ft 2 in)	Central Pulse
Maria Folau	GA, GS	18 February 1987 (aged 31)	1.88 m (6 ft 2 in)	Northern Mystics
Katrina Grant	GK, GD, WD	6 May 1987 (aged 31)	1.87 m (6 ft 2 in)	Central Pulse
Laura Langman (c)	C, WD	16 April 1986 (aged 32)	1.73 m (5 ft 8 in)	Sunshine Coast Lightning
Erikana Pedersen	C, WA, WD	28 July 1994 (aged 24)	1.73 m (5 ft 8 in)	Mainland Tactix
Samantha Sinclair	C, WA, WD	5 June 1995 (aged 23)	1.71 m (5 ft 7 in)	Waikato Bay of Plenty Magic
Te Paea Selby-Rickit	GS, GA	14 January 1992 (aged 26)	1.93 m (6 ft 4 in)	Southern Steel
Michaela Sokolich-Beatson	GD, WD	2 October 1996 (aged 22)	1.84 m (6 ft 0 in)	Northern Mystics
Jane Watson	GK, GD, WD	7 March 1990 (aged 28)	1.81 m (5 ft 11 in)	Mainland Tactix
Maia Wilson	GS	21 September 1997 (aged 21)	1.87 m (6 ft 2 in)	Northern Stars

Head coach

- Noeline Taurua

Notes

- (c) – Captain
- (cc) – Co-captain
- (vc) – Vice-captain
- – Injury / maternity leave
- (TRP) – Temporary Replacement Player

Debuts

- Erikana Pedersen made her senior debut for New Zealand in the third test on 14 October 2018.

== Matches ==
=== First test ===
7 October 2018; 13.00 AEDST	Stats	Australia	57–42	New Zealand	Brisbane Entertainment Centre; Attendance: 7,425	Nine
7 October 2018; 13.00 AEDST	Stats	Scoring by quarter: 10–10, 24–16, 44–27, 57–42			Brisbane Entertainment Centre; Attendance: 7,425	Nine
7 October 2018; 13.00 AEDST	Stats	Caitlin Thwaites 21/21 (100%); Caitlin Bassett 17/21 (81%); Gretel Tippett 12/12 (100%); Stephanie Wood 7/11 (64%)		Maria Folau 26/29 (90%); Maia Wilson 7/10 (70%); Aliyah Dunn 5/6 (83%); Te Paea Selby-Rickit 4/6 (67%)	Brisbane Entertainment Centre; Attendance: 7,425	Nine

=== Second test ===
10 October 2018; 19.30 AEDST	Stats	Australia	56–47	New Zealand	Townsville Entertainment and Convention Centre; Attendance: 4,374	9Gem
10 October 2018; 19.30 AEDST	Stats	Scoring by quarter: 12–11, 29–24, 41–37, 56–47			Townsville Entertainment and Convention Centre; Attendance: 4,374	9Gem
10 October 2018; 19.30 AEDST	Stats	Caitlin Bassett 37/38 (97%); Gretel Tippett 12/12 (100%); Stephanie Wood 7/9 (78%)		Maria Folau 32/38 (84%); Te Paea Selby-Rickit 15/20 (75%)	Townsville Entertainment and Convention Centre; Attendance: 4,374	9Gem

=== Third test ===
14 October 2018	Stats	New Zealand	55–44	Australia	Claudelands Arena	Nine
14 October 2018	Stats	Scoring by quarter: 14–13, 26–30, 41–36, 55–44			Claudelands Arena	Nine
14 October 2018	Stats	Maria Folau 40/41 (98%); Te Paea Selby-Rickit 15/22 (68%)		Caitlin Bassett 20/23 (87%); Gretel Tippett 16/17 (94%); Caitlin Thwaites 5/7 (71%); Stephanie Wood 3/6 (50%)	Claudelands Arena	Nine

=== Fourth test ===
18 October 2018	Stats	New Zealand	47–58	Australia	TSB Arena	9Gem
18 October 2018	Stats	Scoring by quarter: 13–18, 24–32, 33–46, 47–58			TSB Arena	9Gem
18 October 2018	Stats	Maria Folau 27/34 (79%); Te Paea Selby-Rickit 13/19 (68%); Maia Wilson 4/8 (50%); Aliyah Dunn 3/4 (75%)		Caitlin Bassett 37/43 (86%); Gretel Tippett 21/25 (84%)	TSB Arena	9Gem
