= Jane Watson (netball) =

New Zealand netball international

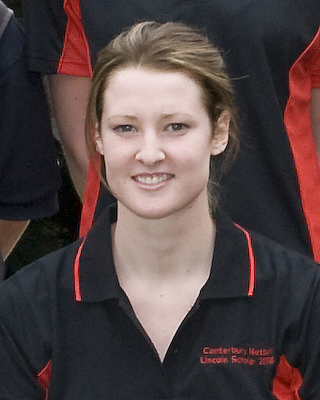
- Watson in 2008

Personal information
- Full name: Jane Louise Watson
- Born: 7 March 1990 (age 36) Christchurch
- Height: 1.81 m (5 ft 11 in)
- School: St Kevin's College
- University: Lincoln University; University of Canterbury

Netball career
- Playing positions: GK, GD, WD
Years	Club team	Apps
2012–2014	Mainland Tactix	30
2015–2017	Southern Steel	
2017–	Mainland Tactix	
Years	National team	Caps
2016–	New Zealand	66
Medal record
Representing New Zealand
Netball World Cup
Gold medal – first place	2019 Liverpool	Team
Fast5 Netball World Series
Gold medal – first place	2016 Melbourne	Team

Jane Louise Watson (born 7 March 1990) is a New Zealand netball international. She was a member of the New Zealand teams that won the 2019 Netball World Cup and the 2021 Constellation Cup. Watson has also played for both Mainland Tactix and Southern Steel in the ANZ Championship and the ANZ Premiership. In 2017 she was a member of the Steel team that won the inaugural ANZ Premiership title. She was named ANZ Premiership Player of the Year in both 2017 and 2020. In April 2022, Watson was included on a list of the 25 best players to feature in netball leagues in New Zealand since 1998.

Watson announced her retirement from netball in June 2026. https://www.rnz.co.nz/news/sport/597731/former-silver-fern-jane-watson-announces-retirement-from-professional-netball

== Early life, family and education ==
Watson was born and raised in the South Island. She is the daughter of Mary and Ross Watson. She initially grew up on her parents farm in Cave before the Watsons moved south to a new farm at Millers Flat on the Clutha River. As a youngster, she played association football and only began playing netball because her school in Millers Flat didn't have a football team. Between 2005 and 2007, Watson attended St Kevin's College, Oamaru as a boarder. In her last year at St Kevin's, Watson suffered from heart problems and subsequently had to wear a pacemaker for three years from the age of 17. In 2010, at the age of 20, she also dealt with the death of her partner. After returning from escorting his body to Samoa, she caught diphtheria. Watson spent three days in isolation at Timaru Hospital before being transferred to Christchurch Hospital. She lost significant weight from the illness. Between 2008 and 2010, Watson attended Lincoln University on a netball scholarship and gained a degree in Recreation Management specialising in sport. Between 2011 and 2012 she attended the University of Canterbury where she gained a Post Graduate Diploma in Teaching and Learning.

== Playing career ==
=== Early years ===
In 2011, Watson was a member of a Canterbury team that finished as runners-up to Otago in the under-21 final at Netball New Zealand's Age Group tournament. She was subsequently included in the under-21 team of the tournament.

=== Lincoln University ===
Watson played netball for Lincoln University in local Canterbury competitions.

=== Mainland Tactix ===
Between 2012 and 2014, Watson made 30 senior appearances for Mainland Tactix in the ANZ Championship. After three seasons playing for Southern Steel, Watson re-joined Tactix ahead of the 2018 ANZ Premiership season. Watson captained Tactix between 2018 and 2021. On 5 May 2019, Watson made her 100th senior league appearance during a 2019 Round 11 match against Northern Stars. In 2020 and 2021, Watson captained Tactix to two successive grand finals. In 2020 she was also named ANZ Premiership Player of the Year. In April 2022, Watson was included on a list of the 25 best players to feature in netball leagues in New Zealand since 1998. Watson will miss the 2022 ANZ Premiership season due to pregnancy. In June 2022, Watson announced she would back in 2023 to play for Tactix. Despite announcing Watson and her partner would move to Ōtaki in 2024 she was signed once for the 2024 season with the Mainland Tactix. Watson celebrated her 150th national league ANZ Premiership game in April 2024.

=== Southern Steel ===
Between 2015 and 2017, Watson played for Southern Steel, initially in the ANZ Championship and later in the ANZ Premiership. In 2016 she was a member of the Steel team that finished the season as minor premiers. She also played her 50th ANZ Championship game. In 2017 she was a member of the Steel team that won both the inaugural ANZ Premiership and Super Club titles. She was subsequently named 2017 ANZ Premiership Player of the Year

=== Giants Netball ===
After 11 years seasons with the Mainland Tactix Watson announced her move to join the Giants Netball for the 2026 Suncorp Super Netball season. Watson missed most of the Giants Netball season games due to a Medial collateral ligament injury.

ANZ Premiership statistics

Season	Team	G/A	GA	RB	CPR	FD	IC	DF	PN	TO	MP
2017	Steel	0/0	?	18	?	?	41	104	109	3	16
2018	Tactix	0/0	?	19	?	?	31	71	127	34	16
2019	Tactix	0/0	0	30	25	0	40	96	117	14	15
2020	Tactix	0/0	5	15	99	10	20	72	75	19	15
2021	Tactix	0/0	0	12	0	0	15	78	109	10	17
Career											

=== New Zealand ===
Watson made her senior debut for New Zealand on 27 August 2016 against England during the 2016 Netball Quad Series. She was a prominent member of the New Zealand team that won the 2019 Netball World Cup. She was also a member of the New Zealand team that won the 2021 Constellation Cup. On 3 March 2021, during the same series, Watson made her 50th test appearance for New Zealand. Alongside Gina Crampton, she also co-captained the team in the absence of Ameliaranne Ekenasio. Watson missed the 2021–22 international season due to a combination of pregnancy and recovering from ankle surgery. Watson was named in the 2022–23 squad after returning from maternity leave.

Tournaments	Place
2016 Netball Quad Series	2nd place, silver medalist(s)
2016 Taini Jamison Trophy Series	1st
2016 Constellation Cup	2nd place, silver medalist(s)
2016 Fast5 Netball World Series	1st place, gold medalist(s)
2017 Netball Quad Series (January/February)	2nd place, silver medalist(s)
2017 Netball Quad Series (August/September)	2nd place, silver medalist(s)
2017 Taini Jamison Trophy Series	1st
2017 Constellation Cup	2nd place, silver medalist(s)
2018 Netball Quad Series (January)	3rd
2018 Netball Quad Series (September)	3rd
2018 Constellation Cup	2nd place, silver medalist(s)
2019 Netball Quad Series	3rd
2019 Netball World Cup	1st place, gold medalist(s)
2019 Constellation Cup	2nd place, silver medalist(s)
2020 Netball Nations Cup	1st place, gold medalist(s)
2020 Taini Jamison Trophy Series	1st place, gold medalist(s)
2021 Constellation Cup	1st place, gold medalist(s)
2023 Netball Quad Series	2nd place, silver medalist(s)
2023 Netball World Cup	4th
2023 Taini Jamison Trophy Series	1st
2023 Constellation Cup	2nd

== Personal life ==
In 2021 Watson announced she was pregnant with her partner, Santana Nicholls-Hepi. Santana has played netball for the New Zealand Defence Force. In May 2022 the couple announced the arrival of their daughter Tia.

== Honours ==
New Zealand

- Netball World Cup
  - Winners: 2019
- Constellation Cup
  - Winners: 2021
- Netball Nations Cup
  - Winners: 2020
- Taini Jamison Trophy
  - Winners: 2016, 2017, 2020, 2023
- Fast5 Netball World Series
  - Winners: 2016

Southern Steel

- ANZ Premiership
  - Winners: 2017
- ANZ Championship
  - Minor premiers: 2016
- Netball New Zealand Super Club
  - Winners: 2017

Mainland Tactix

- ANZ Premiership
  - Runners up: 2020, 2021
  - Winners: 2025

Individual Awards

Year	Award
2017	ANZ Premiership Player of the Year
2020	ANZ Premiership Player of the Year
