= Erikana Pedersen =

New Zealand netball international

Personal information
- Full name: Erikana Pedersen Baledrokadroka
- Born: 28 July 1994 (age 32) Auckland
- Height: 1.73 m (5 ft 8 in)
- Relative: Jone Baledrokadroka (uncle)
- School: Mount Albert Grammar School
- University: Auckland University of Technology; Massey University

Netball career
- Playing positions: C, WA, WD
Years	Club team	Apps
2013–2015	Northern Mystics	
2015–2021	Mainland Tactix	
2017	→ Marama Vou	
2022	Central Pulse	16
Years	National team	Caps
2018	New Zealand	1
Medal record
Representing New Zealand
World Youth Netball Championship
Gold medal – first place	2013 Glasgow	Team

Erikana Pedersen (born 28 July 1994) is a former New Zealand netball international. She began her senior netball playing career with Northern Mystics during the ANZ Championship era. Between 2015 and 2021, Pedersen played for Mainland Tactix. In both 2020 and 2021, she was a prominent member of the Tactix teams that finished as ANZ Premiership runners up and grand finalists. In 2022 she was a member of the Central Pulse team that were ANZ Premiership champions. As a result, between 2020 and 2022, Pedersen played in three successive ANZ Premiership grand finals.

== Early life, family and education ==
Erikana Pedersen Baledrokadroka was born in Auckland. She was born into a Pacific Islander family with ancestry from both Fiji and the Cook Islands. Her Fijian family are from Matailobau in Naitasiri. She is the daughter of Ratu Jope Tini Rinabobo, also known as Paul Baledrokadroka, a teacher at Kelston Boys' High School. He attended Marist Brothers High School in Suva and is the younger brother of Jone Baledrokadroka. Pedersen is the eldest of five siblings. Her brother, Mandela Baledrokadroka, attended Davis & Elkins College on a basketball scholarship, while another brother, Bonowai Baledrokadroka, has played rugby league as well as a younger for the Newcastle Knights under-20 as well as her two younger siblings Leilani and John-Paul Baledrokadroka who attend Westlake girls high school and Rosmini College team. Pedersen attended Mount Albert Grammar School. Together with Maia Wilson and Jamie-Lee Price, she was a member of MAGS teams that won four successive New Zealand Secondary School netball titles between 2012 and 2015. Pedersen has also attended Auckland University of Technology and Massey University.

== Playing career ==
=== Northern Mystics ===
In 2013 and 2014, Pedersen played for Northern Mystics in the ANZ Championship.

=== Mainland Tactix ===
Between 2015 and 2021, Pedersen played for Mainland Tactix. While a Tactix player, Pedersen guested for Marama Vou, a Netball Fiji representative team that played in the 2017 Netball New Zealand Super Club tournament. On 23 May 2018, during a ANZ Premiership Round 3 49–48 win over Northern Stars, Pedersen made 50th senior league appearance. She was subsequently a member of the Tactix team that finished as runners up to Central Pulse in the 2018 Netball New Zealand Super Club tournament.

Pedersen missed most of the 2019 season after suffering an ACL injury just four minutes into the first round match against Waikato Bay of Plenty Magic. However, she successfully returned from the injury and in both 2020 and 2021, she was a prominent member of the Tactix teams that finished as ANZ Premiership runners up and grand finalists. Pedersen was not included in the 2022 Tactix squad after deciding to step back from the elite game. Pedersen returned to the Mainland Tactix for the 2024 ANZ Premiership season. Pedersen was named captain for the 2025 ANZ Premiership season with vice captain Karin Burger.

=== Central Pulse ===
Ahead of the 2022 season, Pedersen came out of her brief retirement and joined Central Pulse as a temporary replacement player. She received a call from Wai Taumaunu, the high performance director and a specialist coach, after Maddy Gordon missed the start of the season with a knee injury. On 21 May 2022, during a 59–49 win over Southern Steel, Pedersen made her 100th senior league appearance. She went to help Pulse win their third ANZ Premiership title. The grand final was her 104th senior league appearance.

=== New Zealand ===
Together with Malia Paseka, Te Paea Selby-Rickit and Phoenix Karaka, Pedersen was a member of the New Zealand team that won the 2013 World Youth Netball Championship. Between 2015 and 2018 she was a member of New Zealand development squads. She also represented New Zealand at the 2017 Fast5 Netball World Series. On 14 October 2018, Pedersen made her only senior appearance for New Zealand in a 55–44 win against Australia during the 2018 Constellation Cup. She replaced Gina Crampton who left the court early in the first quarter for medical attention.

Tournament/Series	Place
2013 World Youth Netball Championship	1st place, gold medalist(s)
2017 Fast5 Netball World Series	4th
2018 Constellation Cup	2nd

== Statistics ==
=== Grand finals ===
	Grand finals	Team	Place	Opponent
1	2020	Mainland Tactix	Runners up	Central Pulse
2	2021	Mainland Tactix	Runners up	Northern Mystics
3	2022	Central Pulse	Winners	Northern Stars

=== ANZ Premiership ===
Season	Team	G/A	GA	RB	CPR	FD	IC	DF	PN	TO	MP
2017	Tactix	0/0	?	6	172	?	4	6	59	22	12
2018	Tactix	0/0	?	6	232	?	2	11	86	49	16
2019	Tactix	0/0	1	0	1	2	0	0	1	1	1
2020	Tactix	0/0	185	0	182	384	2	9	49	35	15
2021	Tactix	0/0	73	0	88	197	2	3	30	10	10
2022	Pulse	0/0	?	0	2	374	7	14	60	45	16
Career											

== Honours ==
Central Pulse

- ANZ Premiership
  - Winners: 2022
  - Minor premiers: 2022

Mainland Tactix

- ANZ Premiership
  - Runners up: 2020, 2021
- Netball New Zealand Super Club
  - Runners Up: 2018
