= Te Wharekura o Arowhenua =

Location
- 734 Tweed Street; Invercargill, Southland; New Zealand; 46.4158°S 168.3922°E

Information
- Type: Composite School
- School district: Newfield
- Ministry of Education Institution no.: 4217
- Principal: Gary Davis
- Grades: Years 1–13
- Enrolment: 189 (July 2026)
- Hours in school day: 6
- Socio-economic decile: 2F.
- Website: www.arowhenua.school.nz

Te Wharekura o Arowhenua is a Māori high school (wharekura) located in Invercargill, New Zealand, teaching students from year 1–13 (aged around 5 to 18 years old). The school has 189 pupils, all of whom are Māori.

== Information ==
The school is one of the various schools funded by the New Zealand government's free and healthy schools lunch programme. The principal of the school, Gary Davis, believes that the Māori language is dying and kura is the only way to keep it alive.

== Student qualifications and engagement ==
=== NCEA Level 1 ===
In 2018, 81.8% of students leaving had attained NCEA Level 1, compared to the regional average of 91.0% and national average of 88.8%, other Decile 2 schools also had an average of 83.4%.

=== NCEA Level 2 ===
In 2018, 72.2% of students leaving had attained NCEA Level 2, this is a 10.6% decrease compared to 2017, when 83.3% of leaving students had attained NCEA Level 2.

The regional average of 79.6% and national average of 79.4%, other Decile 2 schools also had an average of 71.8%.

=== NCEA Level 3 ===
In 2018, 63.6% of students leaving had attained NCEA Level 3, this is a 19.7% decrease compared to 2017, when 83.3% of leaving students had attained NCEA Level 3.

The regional average of 46.7% and national average of 53.7%, other Decile 2 schools also had an average of 41.5%.

=== Engagement ===
In 2018, there were no stand-downs, suspensions or exclusions.

== Cultural activities ==
- Murihiku Polyfest

In December 2019 some students from the school attended Wiki Ha, a Māori sporting event held in Kaitaia that gave kura kids all over New Zealand the chance to experience traditional Māori sporting games.

== Notable Alumni ==
- Aliyah Dunn – New Zealand netball international.
