= Te Amo Amaru-Tibble =

New Zealand netball player

Personal information
- Born: 11 May 1989 (age 37) Wellington, New Zealand
- Occupation: Teacher
- Height: 1.82 m (5 ft 11 1/2 in)
- Relative: Aliyah Dunn (cousin)
- School: Newlands College; Tū Toa
- University: Victoria University

Netball career
- Playing positions: GS, GA
| Years | Club team | Apps |
| 2009–2011 | Central Pulse | |
| 2012–2015 | Wellington NPC | |
| 2016 | Central Zone | |
| 2016–2017 | Central Pulse | |
| 2018–2020 | P.I.C. | |
| 2021 | Central Pulse | 14 |
| Years | National team | Caps |
| 2008 | New Zealand U21 | |

Te Amo Rangimarie Amaru-Tibble (born 11 May 1989) is a New Zealand netball player who has had three spells playing for Central Pulse. She first played for Pulse between 2009 and 2011, during the ANZ Championship era. In 2016 and 2017, she had a second spell. In 2021, Amaru-Tibble returned to Pulse for a third time.

== Early life, family and education ==
Amaru-Tibble is a Māori with Ngāti Porou affiliations. She was born in Wellington. She is a distant cousin of Aliyah Dunn. They had never met before becoming 2021 Central Pulse teammates. However, they found out they are related through Dunn's Southland-based grandmother, who was originally a Tibble with Ngāti Porou family connections. Amaru-Tibble was educated at Newlands College, Tū Toa and Victoria University. In her youth, she originally played basketball and her coaches included Kenny McFadden. While attending Newlands College, she represented the New Zealand women's national basketball team at under-16, under-18 and under-19 (Junior Tall Ferns) levels. Amaru-Tibble is a school teacher and the mother of two daughters, Mereana (born c.2012) and Ngawhata (born c.2014).

== Playing career ==
=== Tū Toa ===
In 2009, Amaru-Tibble switched from Newlands College to Tū Toa and began to focus on netball. She was coached by Yvette McCausland-Durie and played for Tū Toa in both schoolgirl and Netball Manawatu competitions. She would also play for the Tū Toa old girls team, Manukura Black in Netball Manawatu competitions.

=== P.I.C. ===
Since 2009, Amaru-Tibble has also regularly played for P.I.C. Netball Club in Netball Wellington competitions. Before her third spell with Pulse, she played with P.I.C. for three seasons.

=== Central Pulse ===
Amaru-Tibble has had three spells playing for Central Pulse.

2009–2011

Amaru-Tibble first played for Central Pulse between 2009 and 2011 during the ANZ Championship era. Pulse head coach Kate Carpenter invited Amaru-Tibble to be a training partner and then included her in the squad. After Carpenter was replaced by Yvette McCausland-Durie, Amaru-Tibble was retained. She was subsequently a member of the Pulse team that, after 24 games, eventually won their first ever match when they defeated New South Wales Swifts 53–52 in a 2009 Round 13 match at the Te Rauparaha Arena. Partnering Paula Griffin, Amaru-Tibble scored 18 from 21.

2016–2017

In 2016 and 2017, Amaru-Tibble had a second spell playing for Central Pulse. She was initially included in the Central Zone squad for the inaugural 2016 National Netball League season. However, she was subsequently elevated to the 2016 Pulse team to replace an injured Jodi Brown. She retained her place for the 2017 season.

2021

Ahead of the 2021 season, Amaru-Tibble was included in the 2021 Central Pulse squad, initially as a replacement for the departed Tiana Metuarau, providing cover for Ameliaranne Ekenasio and Aliyah Dunn. However, when Ekenasio announced she was pregnant and would miss the rest of the season, Amaru-Tibble found herself promoted to first-choice goal attack.

=== Wellington NPC ===
Amaru-Tibble has represented Wellington in the National Provincial Championships. Together with Karin Burger, Claire Kersten, Te Huinga Reo Selby-Rickit, Elias Shadrock, Whitney Souness and Ameliaranne Wells, she was a member of the Wellington NPC team that defeated North Harbour 59–38 to win the 2015 title.

=== New Zealand ===
In 2008 Amaru-Tibble was included in New Zealand U21 squads.

=== Statistics ===
ANZ Premiership

| Season | Team | G/A | GA | RB | CPR | FD | IC | DF | PN | TO | MP |
|---|---|---|---|---|---|---|---|---|---|---|---|
| 2017 | Pulse | 61/77 (79%) | ? | 1 | 40 | ? | 0 | 0 | 20 | 14 | 11 |
| 2021 | Pulse | 219/269 (81%) | 107 | 17 | 168 | 162 | 0 | 3 | 51 | 66 | 14 |
| Career | | | | | | | | | | | |

== Honours ==
Wellington NPC

- National Provincial Championships
  - Winners: 2015

Central Pulse

- ANZ Premiership
  - Runners up: 2017
