= Kelly Jackson (netball) =

New Zealand netball international

Personal information
- Born: Kelly Jury; 22 October 1996 (age 30) Stratford, New Zealand
- Height: 1.92 m (6 ft 4 in)
- School: New Plymouth Girls' High School
- University: University of Waikato

Netball career
- Playing positions: GK, GD
Years	Club team	Apps
2014–2019	Waikato Bay of Plenty Magic	40
2019–2025	Central Pulse	
2026-	Queensland Firebirds	
Years	National team	Caps
2017–	New Zealand	57
Medal record
Netball
Representing New Zealand
Commonwealth Games
Gold medal – first place	2026 Glasgow	Team
Bronze medal – third place	2022 Birmingham	Team
Fast5 Netball World Series
Gold medal – first place	2016 Melbourne	Team
Netball World Youth Cup
Gold medal – first place	2017 Gaborone	Team

Kelly Jackson (née Jury; born 22 October 1996) is a New Zealand netball international who plays for the Queensland Firebirds in the Super Netball. She was part of the New Zealand team which won gold at the 2026 Commonwealth Games. She was a prominent member of the Central Pulse teams that won the 2020 and 2022 ANZ Premierships. She was the 2022 ANZ Premiership Player of the Year and shared the 2022 Dame Lois Muir Supreme Award with Grace Nweke.

== Early life, family and education ==
Jackson is Māori with Ngāti Kahungunu affiliations. She also has European ancestry. She was born in Stratford, New Zealand. Kelly grew up on a large sheep and beef farm near Makahu. She attended Makahu Primary School and New Plymouth Girls' High School. She attended the University of Waikato, where she studied for a Bachelor of Sport and Leisure Studies.

== Club career ==
=== Early years ===
Jackson began playing netball aged seven. In her youth she played for various representative teams. She played for Taranaki at under-15, under-17 and under-19 levels as well as the New Zealand Maori Secondary Schools and the Manawatu NPC teams. She originally played as a goal shooter before switching to goal keeper. She also captained New Plymouth Girls' High School. Shortly after being named in the 2015 Waikato Bay of Plenty Magic squad she suffered an Achilles tendon rupture while playing for her school.

=== Waikato Bay of Plenty Magic ===
Between 2015 and 2019, Jackson made 40 senior league appearances for Waikato Bay of Plenty Magic. Jackson was just 17 and still attending New Plymouth Girls' High School when she signed her first Magic contract. However she missed the 2015 season because of inJackson. During a 2018 Round 2 match against Southern Steel, Jackson suffered a dislocated shoulder. She subsequently missed most of the season.

=== Central Pulse ===
Jackson signed for Central Pulse ahead of the 2020 ANZ Premiership season. She made her debut for Pulse during the pre-season Otaki tournament. She was a member of the Pulse team that were 2020 minor premiers and overall champions. Although Jackson mainly plays as a goalkeeper, she can also play as a goal defender. Ahead of the 2022 ANZ Premiership season, Jackson was named Pulse co-captain alongside Tiana Metuarau. Jackson was a stand out player for the 2022 Central Pulse team that won the premiership title. She was included in Brendon Egan's Stuff's team of the season, was named MVP as Pulse defeated Stars 56–37 in the grand final, was named the 2022 ANZ Premiership Player of the Year and shared the 2022 Dame Lois Muir Supreme Award with Grace Nweke.

== International career ==
Jackson was a member of the New Zealand team that won the 2016 Fast5 Netball World Series. Jackson made her senior debut for New Zealand on 2 February 2017 during a Quad Series match against England. She came on in the final quarter and helped New Zealand secure a 61–37 win. She was subsequently a member of the New Zealand team that won the 2017 Netball World Youth Cup. She was the player of the match as New Zealand defeated Australia 60–57 in the final. In September 2017, she was again player of the match as New Zealand defeated Australia 57–47 to win their first Quad Series. She went on to represent New Zealand at the 2018 and 2022 Commonwealth Games. She captained New Zealand for the second test of the 2025 Taini Jamison Trophy Series. Jackson was named in the squad for the 2026 Commonwealth Games, where the Silver Ferns won their first Commonwealth Games gold medal in 16 years, defeating Jamaica in the final.

Tournaments	Place
2016 Fast5 Netball World Series	1st place, gold medalist(s)
2017 Netball Quad Series (January/February)	2nd place, silver medalist(s)
2017 Netball World Youth Cup	1st place, gold medalist(s)
2017 Netball Quad Series (August/September)	1st place, gold medalist(s)
2017 Taini Jamison Trophy Series	1st
2017 Constellation Cup	2nd place, silver medalist(s)
2018 Netball Quad Series (January)	3rd
2018 Taini Jamison Trophy Series	2nd
2018 Commonwealth Games	4th
2020 Taini Jamison Trophy Series	1st place, gold medalist(s)
2021 Taini Jamison Trophy Series	2nd place, silver medalist(s)
2022 Netball Quad Series	3rd
2022 Commonwealth Games	3rd place, bronze medalist(s)
2022 Taini Jamison Trophy Series	1st place, gold medalist(s)
2022 Constellation Cup	2nd place, silver medalist(s)
2023 Netball Quad Series	2nd place, silver medalist(s)
2023 Netball World Cup	4th
2023 Taini Jamison Trophy Series	1st
2023 Constellation Cup	2nd
2024 Netball Nations Cup	3rd
2024 Taini Jamison Trophy Series	2nd
2024 Constellation Cup	1st
2025 Taini Jamison Trophy Series	1st
2025 Constellation Cup	2nd
2025 New Zealand netball tour of Great Britain	
2026 Commonwealth Games	1st

== Statistics ==
Season	Team	G/A	GA	RB	CPR	FD	IC	DF	PN	TO	MP
2016	Magic										8
2017	Magic	0/0	?	21	0	?	37	63	198	3	15
2018	Magic	0/0	?	1	0	?	5	7	18	1	2
2019	Magic	0/0	0	27	0	0	37	79	187	5	15
2020	Pulse	0/0	0	14	0	0	26	47	153	6	14
2021	Pulse	0/0	1	14	19	2	21	51	170	12	14
2022	Pulse	0/0	0	36	0	0	46	116	189	9	16
2023	Pulse										
Career											

== Honours ==
=== New Zealand ===
- Commonwealth Games: 2026
- Constellation Cup: 2024
- Netball Quad Series: 2017 (August/September)
- Taini Jamison Trophy: 2017, 2020, 2022, 2023, 2025
- Netball World Youth Cup: 2017
- Fast5 Netball World Series: 2016

=== Central Pulse ===
- ANZ Premiership
  - Winners: 2020, 2022
  - Minor premiers: 2020, 2022

== Individual awards ==
Year	Award
2022	Grand Final MVP
2022	Dame Lois Muir Supreme Award
2022	ANZ Premiership Player of the Year
