= Aliyah Dunn =

New Zealand netball international

Personal information
- Full name: Aliyah Dunn
- Born: 19 October 1999 (age 27) Invercargill
- Height: 1.90 m (6 ft 3 in)
- Relative: Te Amo Amaru-Tibble (cousin)
- School: Te Wharekura o Arowhenua; Verdon College

Netball career
- Playing positions: GS, GA
Years	Club team	Apps
2017	Netball South	
2017	→ Southern Steel	2
2017–2022	Central Pulse	77
2022–	Mainland Tactix	15
Years	National team	Caps
2018–	New Zealand	4
Medal record
Representing New Zealand
Netball World Youth Cup
Gold medal – first place	2017 Gaborone	Team
Fast5 Netball World Series
Gold medal – first place	2018 Melbourne	Team
Bronze medal – third place	2022 Christchurch	Team

Aliyah Maryanne Heneriata Dunn (born 19 October 1999) is a New Zealand netball international. Dunn was a prominent member of the Central Pulse teams that won the 2019, 2020 and 2022 ANZ Premiership titles. She was also a fringe member of the 2017 Southern Steel team that won the inaugural ANZ Premiership title. Dunn was also a member of the New Zealand teams that won the 2017 Netball World Youth Cup and the 2018 Fast5 Netball World Series. Between 2015 and 2017, Dunn also represented the New Zealand women's national basketball team at under-17 and under-19 (Junior Tall Ferns) levels. In 2022 she played for Tokomanawa Queens in the new Tauihi Basketball Aotearoa league.

== Early life, family and education ==
Dunn was born and raised in Invercargill. She is of Māori and Samoan descent. She is a distant cousin of Te Amo Amaru-Tibble. They had never met before becoming 2021 Central Pulse team mates. However, they found out they are related through Dunn's Southland-based grandmother, who was originally a Tibble with Ngāti Porou family connections. Dunn also has Whakatōhea, Ngāti Kahungunu ki Wairarapa and Te Whānau-ā-Apanui affiliations. Both of Dunn's parents played representative basketball for Southland. Her father, Terrence, also played for Southland Sharks. Aliyah's four siblings have all played basketball at a representative level. In her youth, Dunn played both representative netball and basketball. She attended Te Wharekura o Arowhenua and Verdon College.

== Netball ==
=== Playing career ===
==== Southern Steel ====
Dunn was a fringe member of the 2017 Southern Steel team, making two appearances as Steel won the inaugural ANZ Premiership title. She began the season playing for Netball South, Southern Steel's reserve team, in the Beko Netball League. On 30 April she made her ANZ Premiership debut for Steel in a 66–46 win against Northern Mystics. Dunn replaced Jhaniele Fowler-Reid with two minutes left in the fourth quarter. On 14 June, after four Steel players were injured in a road traffic accident, Dunn was one of four Netball South players called up to the Steel team for a 51–46 win against Mainland Tactix.

==== Central Pulse ====
Ahead of the 2018 season, Dunn signed for Central Pulse. Dunn was subsequently a prominent member of the Pulse teams that won the 2019, 2020 and 2022 ANZ Premiership titles. In 2018 she landed 524 goals from 577 attempts with a 91% accuracy. Only Lenize Potgieter was more accurate. Dunn finished the 2019, 2020 and 2021 seasons as the most accurate New Zealand shooter in the league with 92%, 91% and 90% returns, respectively. In 2022 Dunn was the ANZ Premiership's leading goal-scorer, landing 618 out of 664 with 93% accuracy. Between 2018 and 2022, Dunn played and scored in four grand finals for Pulse. At the end of the 2022 season, Dunn announced she was leaving Pulse.

==== Mainland Tactix ====
Ahead of the 2023 season, Dunn signed for Mainland Tactix.

==== New Zealand ====
Dunn was a member of the New Zealand team that won the 2017 Netball World Youth Cup. She made her senior debut for New Zealand on 18 September 2018 against South Africa during the September 2018 Netball Quad Series. In October 2018 she featured for New Zealand in the 2018 Constellation Cup and was a member of the Fast5 Ferns team that won the 2018 Fast5 Netball World Series. Despite her impressive scoring stats with Central Pulse and been called up for training squads, Dunn was not included in the 2019 Netball World Cup or 2022 Commonwealth Games squads.

Tournaments	Place
2017 Netball World Youth Cup	1st place, gold medalist(s)
2018 Netball Quad Series (September)	3rd
2018 Constellation Cup	2nd place, silver medalist(s)
2018 Fast5 Netball World Series	1st place, gold medalist(s)
2022 Fast5 Netball World Series	3rd place, bronze medalist(s)

== Statistics ==
=== Grand finals ===
	Grand finals	Team	Place	Opponent	Goals (%)
1	2018	Central Pulse	Runners up	Southern Steel	32/35 (91%)
2	2019	Central Pulse	Winners	Northern Stars	40/43 (93%)
3	2020	Central Pulse	Winners	Mainland Tactix	28/30 (93%)
4	2022	Central Pulse	Winners	Northern Stars	44/47 (94%)

=== ANZ Premiership statistics ===
Season	Team	G/A	GA	RB	CPR	FD	IC	DF	PN	TO	MP
2017	Steel	1/2 (50%)									2
2018	Pulse	524/577 (91%)	?	0	0	?	2	2	30	62	16
2019	Pulse	521/565 (92%)	17	0	0	24	0	8	46	76	16
2020	Pulse	340/372 (91%)	20	0	0	23	3	6	19	49	14
2021	Pulse	539/601 (90%)	28	0	0	46	2	10	31	62	15
2022	Pulse	618/664 (93%)	?	0	0	34	1	12	15	57	16
2023	Tactix	Goals scored									
Career											

== Basketball ==
=== Playing career ===
==== New Zealand ====
Between 2015 and 2017, Dunn represented New Zealand at under-17 and under-19 (Junior Tall Ferns) levels. She was selected to play for the under-17s aged just 15 while attending Verdon College. She subsequently played for New Zealand teams that toured Fiji and China.

==== Club level ====
In 2019, Dunn was a member of the Capital Swish team that won Women's Basketball Championship Division 2 title. After missing out on selection for the New Zealand national netball team for the 2022 Commonwealth Games, Dunn switched codes and signed for Tokomanawa Queens in the new Tauihi Basketball Aotearoa league.

== Honours ==
=== Netball ===
New Zealand

- Fast5 Netball World Series
  - Winners: 2018
- Netball World Youth Cup
  - Winners: 2017

Central Pulse

- ANZ Premiership
  - Winners: 2019, 2020, 2022
  - Runners up: 2017, 2018
  - Minor premiers: 2018, 2019, 2020, 2022
- Netball New Zealand Super Club
  - Winners: 2018

Southern Steel

- ANZ Premiership
  - Winners: 2017
  - Minor premiers: 2017

=== Basketball ===
Tokomanawa Queens

- Tauihi Basketball Aotearoa
  - Winners: 2022
