= Maia Wilson =

New Zealand netball international

Personal information
- Full name: Maia Wilson
- Born: 21 September 1997 (age 29) Auckland
- Height: 1.87 m (6 ft 2 in)
- School: Mount Albert Grammar School
- University: Massey University

Netball career
- Playing positions: GS, GA
Years	Club team	Apps
2015–2016	Central Pulse	13
2017–	Northern Stars	
Years	National team	Caps
2016–	New Zealand	51
Medal record
Representing New Zealand
Fast5 Netball World Series
Gold medal – first place	2016 Melbourne	Team
Silver medal – second place	2024 Christchurch	Team
Netball World Youth Cup
Gold medal – first place	2017 Gaborone	Team
Netball at the Commonwealth Games
Bronze medal – third place	2022 Birmingham	Team

Maia Kahurangi Wilson (born 21 September 1997) is a New Zealand netball international. She was a member of the New Zealand teams that won the 2017 Netball World Youth Cup and the 2021 Constellation Cup. She also represented New Zealand at the 2022 Commonwealth Games. Wilson made her senior league debut with Central Pulse during the 2016 ANZ Championship season. Since 2017, she has played for Northern Stars in the ANZ Premiership. In both 2018 and 2019, she was the ANZ Premiership top goal scorer. Wilson was a prominent member of the 2019 and 2022 Northern Stars teams that were ANZ Premiership grand finalists. Ahead of the 2021 season, she was appointed Stars captain. Wilson is also a former New Zealand women's basketball international.

== Early life, family and education ==
Wilson is a Māori with Te Rarawa, Te Waiohua, Te Ākitai Waiohua and Ngāti Te Ata Waiohua affiliations. She was born in Auckland. She is the daughter of Joe and Kārena Wilson. She has one brother, Kahikatea. Her father died in 2016 from a brain tumor. She attended Mount Albert Grammar School, representing the school at both netball and basketball. Between 2016 and 2022 she attended Massey University. In May 2022, she graduated with a Bachelor of Communication, majoring in Public Relations, with a minor in Media Studies.

== Basketball ==
=== School and club career ===
Wilson played basketball for Mount Albert Grammar School in school competitions and for Waitakere West Lady Rangers in club competitions. In 2015 she was offered a basketball scholarship to the University of Idaho, but turned it down when she was offered a netball contract with Central Pulse.

=== New Zealand ===
In August 2014, Wilson played for New Zealand in a four-nation tournament in China. She also represented New Zealand at the 2014 FIBA Oceania Under-18 Championship for Women.

== Netball ==
=== Playing career ===
==== Mount Albert ====
Wilson was selected for the Mount Albert Grammar School senior A team while still in Year 9, her first year at the school. Between 2012 and 2015, together with Erikana Pedersen and Jamie-Lee Price, Wilson was a member of MAGS teams that won four successive New Zealand Secondary School netball titles. The MAGS team was coached by Te Aroha Keenan. While still attending MAGS, Wilson signed a contract with Central Pulse and was invited to attend trials with the senior New Zealand team. During the 2015 NZSS tournament, Wilson scored 230 from 252 as she helped MAGS win a fourth successive title. She scored 36 from 39 as MAGS beat Saint Kentigern College 41–35 in the final. This was her last game for MAGS.

==== Central Pulse ====
Ahead of the 2016 ANZ Championship season, Wilson signed for Central Pulse. Following an injury to Jodi Brown, Wilson became a regular starter, playing alongside Ameliaranne Wells. She made her senior league debut with Pulse in a Round 1 match against Waikato Bay of Plenty Magic, scoring 34 from 38 in a 57–56 win. Wilson played just one season with Pulse, making 13 appearances and scoring 412 from 447 with a 92% success rate.

==== Northern Stars ====
Since 2017, Wilson has played for Northern Stars in the ANZ Premiership. In 2018 she was the ANZ Premiership top goal scorer. She scored 566 from 633 with an 89% success rate. On 31 March 2019, Wilson made her 50th senior league appearance while playing for Stars against Northern Mystics. In 2019, Wilson was again the ANZ Premiership top goal scorer. She scored 619 from 743 with an 83% success rate. Her goals helped the 2019 Northern Stars reach the grand final. Ahead of the 2021 season, Wilson was appointed Stars captain. On 22 May 2022, Wilson made her 100th senior league appearance while playing for Stars in a 2022 Round 11 against Mystics. Wilson subsequently captained Stars to a second grand final.

==== New Zealand ====
In 2015 and 2016, Wilson was invited to attend trials with the senior New Zealand team. She made her senior debut, aged just 19, on 14 September 2016 during a 2016 Taini Jamison Trophy Series match against Jamaica. Coming on in the final minutes of the fourth quarter, Wilson made an immediate impact, slotting her first shot on goal and going on to net three goals on debut. She was subsequently a member of the New Zealand team that won the 2017 Netball World Youth Cup.

In the opening match of the 2020 Netball Nations Cup, Wilson, in just her 11th test and second start, scored 27 from 29 against England. In the second match against Jamaica she scored 42 from 45 in a 71–45 win. She finished the tournament scoring 137 from 151 with a 91% success rate. During the 2020 Taini Jamison Trophy Series against England, Wilson scored 116 from 127 with a 91% success rate. She was a prominent member of the New Zealand team that won the 2021 Constellation Cup. She scored 140 from 161 with an 87% success rate and was the only New Zealand player to play all 240 minutes over the series. On 6 October 2024, Wilson made her 50th senior appearance for New Zealand in the 2024 Taini Jamison Trophy Series.

Tournaments	Place	Goals (%)
2016 Taini Jamison Trophy Series	1st	13/15 (87%)
2016 Constellation Cup	2nd place, silver medalist(s)	
2016 Fast5 Netball World Series	1st place, gold medalist(s)	
2017 Netball Quad Series (January/February)	2nd place, silver medalist(s)	4/6 (67%)
2017 Netball World Youth Cup	1st place, gold medalist(s)	
2017 Netball Quad Series (August/September)	1st	5/5 (100%)
2017 Constellation Cup	2nd place, silver medalist(s)	5/6 (83%)
2017 Fast5 Netball World Series	4th	
2018 Constellation Cup	2nd place, silver medalist(s)	11/18 (61%)
2019 Netball Quad Series	3rd	5/6 (83%)
2020 Netball Nations Cup	1st place, gold medalist(s)	137/151 (91%)
2020 Taini Jamison Trophy Series	1st place, gold medalist(s)	116/127 (91%)
2021 Constellation Cup	1st place, gold medalist(s)	140/161 (87%)
2021 Taini Jamison Trophy Series	2nd	65/79 (82%)
2022 Netball Quad Series	3rd	104/119 (87%)
2022 Commonwealth Games	3rd place, bronze medalist(s)	75/82 (91%)
2022 Taini Jamison Trophy Series	1st	30/31 (97%)
2022 Constellation Cup	2nd	4/4 (100%)
2023 Netball Quad Series	2nd place, silver medalist(s)	
2023 Netball World Cup	4th	
2023 Taini Jamison Trophy Series	1st	9/11 (82%)
2023 Constellation Cup	2nd	2/2 (100%)
2024 Taini Jamison Trophy Series	2nd	3/3 (100%)
2024 Constellation Cup	1st	5/6 (83%)
2024 Fast5 Netball World Series	2nd	

== Statistics ==
=== Grand finals ===
	Grand finals	Team	Place	Opponent	Goals (%)
1	2019	Northern Stars	Runners up	Central Pulse	34/41 (83%)
2	2022	Northern Stars	Runners up	Central Pulse	21/25 (84%)

=== Individual stats ===
Season	Team	G/A	GA	RB	CPR	FD	IC	DF	PN	TO	MP
2016	Pulse	412/447 (92%)									13
2017	Stars	434/496 (88%)	?	22	0	?	0	5	29	79	15
2018	Stars	566/633 (89%)	?	19	0	?	1	6	29	100	15
2019	Stars	619/743 (83%)	15	27	0	26	1	9	38	122	17
2020	Stars	461/513 (90%)	16	19	0	34	0	5	20	56	13
2021	Stars	483/594 (81%)	16	39	0	35	0	8	29	94	15
2022	Stars	574/662 (87%)	16	32	0	32	2	6	23	87	17
2023	Stars	0/0									
Career											

== Personal life ==
Wilson has been open about her past body image struggles starting from her teenage years. Wilson trains out of Peach Boxing with Isaac Peach to help with fitness.

== Honours ==
New Zealand

- Constellation Cup
  - Winners: 2021, 2024
- Taini Jamison Trophy
  - Winners: 2016, 2020, 2022, 2023
- Netball Nations Cup
  - Winners: 2020
- Netball Quad Series
  - Winners: 2017 (August/September)
- Netball World Youth Cup
  - Winners: 2017
- Fast5 Netball World Series
  - Winners: 2016

Northern Stars

- ANZ Premiership
  - Runners Up: 2019, 2021
