= George Fisher (netball) =

English netball player

Personal information
- Full name: Georgina Inger (Née: Fisher)
- Born: 30 September 1998 (age 27) Hoddesdon, Hertfordshire
- Height: 188 cm (6 ft 2 in)
- Spouse: Brayden Inger
- University: University of Hertfordshire

Netball career
- Playing positions: GS, GA
Years	Club team	Apps
2016	Hertfordshire Mavericks	
2017–2018	Wasps Netball	
2019–2020	Saracens Mavericks	
2021–2024	Southern Steel	
2025	London Mavericks (TRP / Nxt Gen)	
2026–present	London Mavericks	
Years	National team	Caps
2014-	England	22
- Updated on April 2024

Georgina Inger (née Fisher; born 30 September 1998) is an English professional netball player. She plays for London Mavericks NXT Gen team. She was a member of the Wasps Netball team which won the Super League in 2017 and 2018. Fisher represented England in the 2018 Sunshine Series against Jamaica and the 2018 Fast5 Netball World Series in Melbourne.

She was a part of the England netball program at the age of 14, and joined the England under 17 team in 2014.

== Early life and education ==
Fisher began playing netball at school when she was 11 before joining Turnford Netball Club. She was also a national swimmer. Fisher studied at the University of Hertfordshire, winning the BUCs national championship in 2018 and 2019.

== Club career ==
=== Hertfordshire Mavericks ===
Fisher begun her netball career in the Mavericks pathway system featuring in the U19 NPL squad. She earned her Super League debut in the 2016 season.

=== Wasps Netball ===
Fisher joined Wasps Netball ahead of their inaugural season in 2017. She won the Netball Super League title in 2017 and again 2018.

=== BenecosMavericks ===
Following 2 Championship winning seasons with Wasps, Fisher returned to Mavericks ahead of the 2019 season.

=== Southern Steel ===
In September 2020, Fisher announced that she would be joining Southern Steel for the 2021 ANZ Premiership season. Fishers 2022 season was praised with her 92% shooting accuracy. Ahead of the 2023 season Fisher ruptured her ACL and fractured her knee during a pre-season match. She then required another surgery ahead of the 2024 season, missing out a second season.

=== London Mavericks NXT Gen ===
Fisher joined London Maverick's NXT Gen team ahead of the 2025 season. She made her return to court in March 2025 after over 2 years of injury and in June 2025 returned to the Netball Super League as a temporary replacement player in the round 14 and minor semi final matches against Manchester Thunder.

=== London Mavericks ===
Fisher was promoted in into London Mavericks senior squad for the 2026 season.

== International career ==
Fisher was selected into the England Roses U17s at 14 years old. She was a member of the U21 team which competed in the 2017 Netball World Youth Cup in Botswana.

Fisher was one of the 21 players awarded a full time netball contract ahead of the 2019 Netball World Cup.

She was named as a reserve for the 2022 Commonwealth Games.

== Personal life ==
Fisher announced her engagement to Southland Sharks player Brayden Inger in September 2022. They married in 2024 and moved back the UK with Inger choosing to play for Hemel Storm.
