= Te Wānanga o Raukawa =

Tertiary institute in Ōtaki, New Zealand

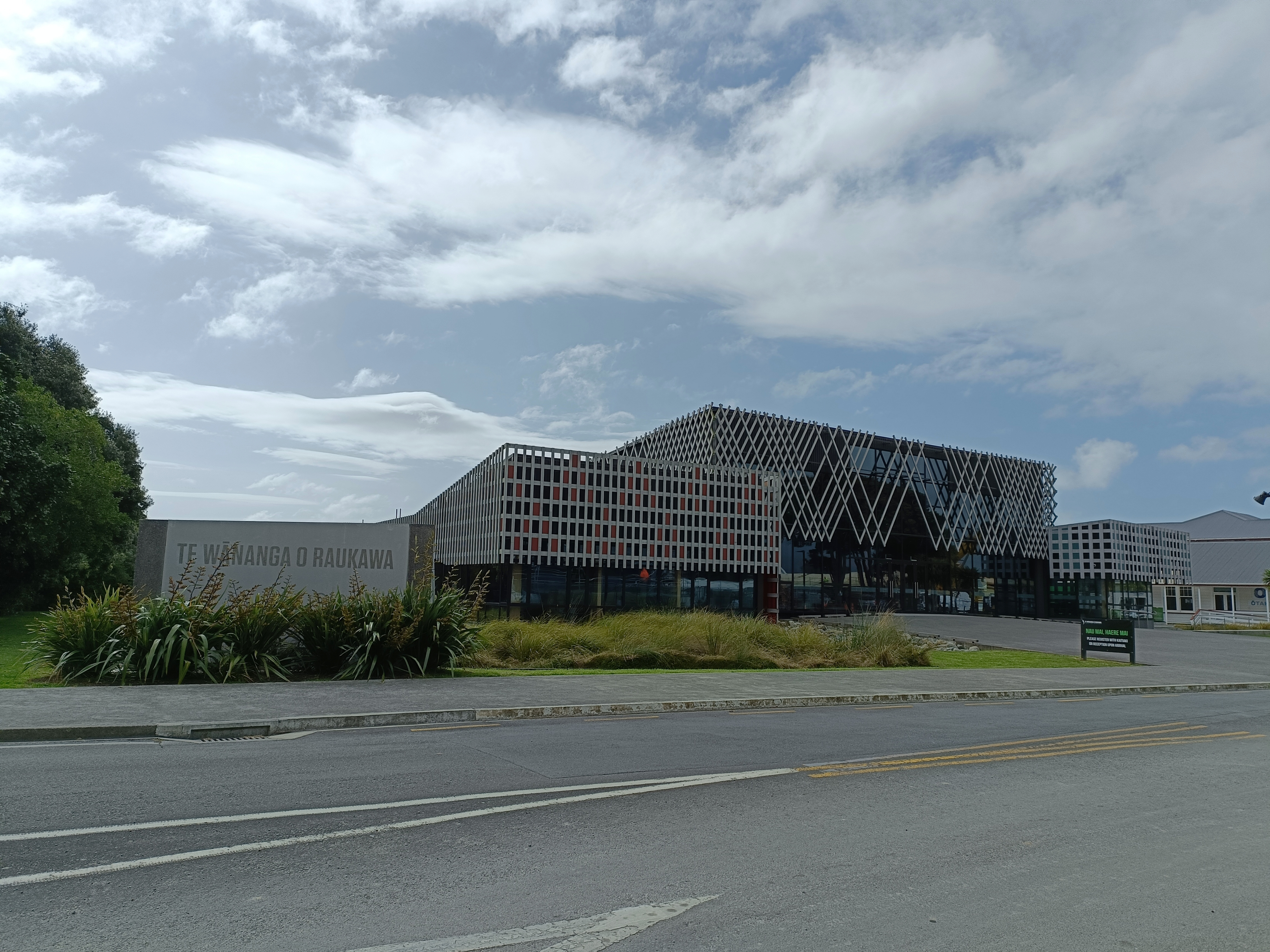
- Te Wānanga o Raukawa campus in Ōtaki, New Zealand
- Motto: E Kore Au E Ngaro
- Type: Wānanga
- Established: 1981
- Founder: Whatarangi Winiata
- Location: Ōtaki, New Zealand; 40°44′59.92″S 175°8′6.79″E
- Language: Māori
- Website: www.wananga.com

Te Wānanga o Raukawa is a Māori wānanga (indigenous tertiary-education provider) in New Zealand, established in 1981. Based in Ōtaki, with smaller campuses in Auckland and Gisborne, the wānanga was born out of a collaborative tribal desire or experiment known as Whakatupuranga Rua Mano or Generation 2000 to help bring Māori people back to their marae, revitalise the Māori language, and develop Māori with the necessary tools and skills to empower them to succeed in the world while retaining the knowledge of their ancestors. All qualifications underpin a Māori world view and at diploma level and above include a specialisation, iwi and hapū studies and Māori language studies.

== History ==
Whatarangi Winiata ascertained that in 1975 there were only 100 speakers of the Māori language between Tītahi Bay and the Rangitīkei River. He set out to change that and introduced immersive courses run by the Raukawa Marae Trustees called Whakatupuranga Rua Mano or Generation 2000. Te Wānanga o Raukawa was established in 1981 as a 'natural extension' of the Whakatupuranga Rua Mano programmes. Te Wānanga o Raukawa was the first tertiary institution with a 'basis in Maori learning' to be established in New Zealand.

Winiata pointed out in 1982 that universities were not well suited to Māori and at the time Victoria University of Wellington was only 1% Māori with a running cost of $25 million.

Early people and staff involved were Winiata, Jim MacGregor, Tūroa Royal, Māui Pōmare, Te Maharanui Jacob, Mason Durie, Ngarongo Iwikatea Nicholson, Piripi Walker, Whata Davis, Bernard Kernot, Kohe Webster (master carver), Taihakurei Edward Durie and Hiko Hohepa.

Whatarangi Winiata was the chief executive from 1994 to 2007.

== See also ==
- Te Wānanga o Aotearoa
- Te Whare Wānanga o Awanuiārangi
