= Kelera Nawai-Caucau =

Fijian netball player (born 1997)

Kelera Nawai
Personal information
- Born: 14 December 1997 (age 28)
- Occupation: Netball player
- Height: 1.89 m (6 ft 2 in)

Netball career
- Playing positions: Goal keeper, Goal defense

Kelera Nawai (born 14 December 1997) is a Fijian netball player who plays goal defense or goal keeper.

She was included in the Fijian squad for the 2019 Netball World Cup, which was also her maiden appearance at a Netball World Cup.
