= Northern Stars =

New Zealand netball team

- Founded: 2016
- Based in: Papakura; Takanini
- Regions: East Auckland; South Auckland
- Home venue: Pulman Arena
- Head coach: Temepara Bailey
- Captain: Maia Wilson
- League: ANZ Premiership
- Website: starsnetball.co.nz
Uniform

Northern Stars are a New Zealand netball team based in South Auckland. Since 2017 they have competed in the ANZ Premiership. The team was named after the Matariki star cluster which is also featured on the team's logo. They were grand finalists in 2019 and 2021.

== History ==
=== Formation ===
After Netball Australia and Netball New Zealand announced that the ANZ Championship would be discontinued after the 2016 season, Netball New Zealand subsequently replaced it with the ANZ Premiership. The founding members of the ANZ Premiership included the five former New Zealand ANZ Championship teams – Central Pulse, Mainland Tactix, Northern Mystics, Southern Steel and Waikato Bay of Plenty Magic – plus a brand new franchise, the South Auckland-based Northern Stars. The team was named after the Matariki star cluster which is also featured on the team's logo. Former Melbourne Vixens head coach, Julie Hoornweg, was named Stars inaugural head coach and Leana de Bruin became their first captain. Other members of the inaugural squad included vice captain Courtney Tairi plus Kayla Cullen, Maia Wilson, Malia Paseka and Sulu Fitzpatrick.

=== ANZ Premiership ===
Since 2017, Stars have played in the ANZ Premiership. They were grand finalists in 2019. In 2022, Stars were grand finalists for a second time.

Regular season statistics

Season	Position	Won	Drawn	Lost
2017	5th	4	0	11
2018	6th	4	0	11
2019	3rd	6	0	9
2020	4th	5	3	7
2021	4th	9	0	6
2022	2nd	11	0	4
2023	3rd	9	0	6
2024	5th	2	0	13
2025	6th	1	0	9

Grand finalists

== Grand finals ==
ANZ Premiership

Season	Winners	Score	Runners up	Venue
2019	Central Pulse	52–48	Northern Stars	Te Rauparaha Arena
2022	Central Pulse	56–37	Northern Stars	TSB Bank Arena
2023	Northern Mystics	74–56	Northern Stars	Globox Arena

== Home venues ==
Since 2018, Stars main home venue has been Takanini's Pulman Arena.

	Years
Pulman Arena, Takanini	2018–
Vodafone Events Centre	2017
ASB Kohimarama, Auckland	2017

== Notable players ==
=== 2026 squad ===
2026 Northern Stars roster
Players
Coaching staff

Nat.	Name	Position(s)	DoB	Height
(New Zealand)	Amelia Walmsley	GS	31 January 2004 (age 22)	1.92 m (6 ft 4 in)
(New Zealand)	Martina Salmon	GS, GA	19 June 2003 (age 23)	1.90 m (6 ft 3 in)
(New Zealand)	Kate Burley	WD, GD, GK	23 April 1997 (age 29)	1.80 m (5 ft 11 in)
(New Zealand)	Samon Nathan	WA, C, WD	7 December 1992 (age 33)	1.78 m (5 ft 10 in)
(New Zealand)	Greer Sinclair	C, WD	26 September 2000 (age 26)	1.82 m (6 ft 0 in)
(New Zealand)	Mila Reuelu-Buchanan (vc)	WA, C	11 May 1998 (age 28)	1.72 m (5 ft 8 in)
(New Zealand)	Lili Tokaduadua	GD, GK	24 September 2004 (age 22)	–
(New Zealand)	Claire O'Brien	WA, C	11 March 1997 (age 29)	1.73 m (5 ft 8 in)
(Australia)	Aimee Landrigan	GK,GD		1.90 m (6 ft 3 in)
(New Zealand)	Crystal Maro	GA,GS		–

Head coach

- Temepara Bailey

Assistant coach

- Leana De Bruin

Manager: Debra Charteris
Physiotherapist: Sarah Fanuatanu
Strength and conditioning: Barrie Jennings

Notes

- (c) – Captain
- (cc) – Co-captain
- (vc) – Vice-captain
- – Injury / maternity leave
- (TRP) – Temporary Replacement Player
Player profiles: Team website
Last updated: 19 February 2026

=== Internationals ===
New Zealand

- Temepara Bailey
- Leana de Bruin
- Gina Crampton
- Monica Falkner
- Sulu Fitzpatrick
- Ellen Halpenny
- Anna Harrison
- Kayla Johnson
- Amorangi Malesala
- Grace Kara
- Storm Purvis
- Elle Temu
- Anna Thompson
- Courtney Tairi
- Mila Reuelu-Buchanan
- Malia Vaka
- Maia Wilson
- Katrina Rore

England

- Ama Agbeze

Fiji

- Kelera Nawai-Caucau
- Afa Rusivakula

Samoa

- Julianna Naoupu

South Africa

- Leana de Bruin

Tonga

- Vika Koloto

Trinidad and Tobago

- Daystar Swift

=== Captains ===
	Years
Leana de Bruin	2017, 2019
Grace Kara	2018, 2020
Maia Wilson	2021–

== Coaches ==
=== Head coaches ===
Coach	Years
Julie Hoornweg	2016–2017
Kiri Wills	2017–2024
Temepara Bailey	2025–

=== Assistant coaches ===
Coach	Years
Temepara Bailey	2017–2020
Paula Smith	2021–2024
Leana De Bruin	2025–

== Main sponsors ==
Sponsors	Seasons
Robinhood	c. 2020–

== Reserve team ==
Since 2017, Northern Comets have competed in the National Netball League. They are effectively the reserve team of Northern Stars. Comets were originally governed and managed by Netball Northern. However in November 2019, Northern Stars began to directly manage the team. In 2019, Temepara Bailey was appointed Comets head coach. In 2021 she guided Comets to the NNL grand final.

== Honours ==
- ANZ Premiership
  - Runners Up: 2019, 2022, 2023
