= Whitney Souness =

New Zealand international netball player

Personal information
- Born: 12 October 1995 (age 30)
- Height: 1.74 m (5 ft 9 in)
- School: St Marys College

Netball career
- Playing positions: C, WA
Years	Club team	Apps
2015-2019	Central Pulse	
2020	Waikato/BOP Magic	
2021-2025	Central Pulse	
2026	Giants Netball	
Years	National team	Caps
2017–	New Zealand	30
- (Correct as of 3 April 2023)
Medal record
Representing New Zealand
Women's netball
Netball at the Commonwealth Games
Bronze medal – third place	2022 Birmingham	Team

Whitney Souness (born 1995) is a New Zealand netball player. She currently plays for Giants Netball and has played 30 times for the New Zealand national netball team.

== Early life ==
Souness was born on 12 October or 12 November 1995 (sources vary). She comes from Porirua in the Wellington Region of the North Island of New Zealand. She attended St Mary's College in Wellington and, on the school's netball team, was coached by the former Samoan international, Pelesa Semu. She was chosen for the New Zealand Secondary Schools side in 2013, and was in the national development squad in 2014 and 2015.

== Netball career ==
Souness joined Central Pulse in 2015, however she suffered an ACL injury while playing for Wellington in the final of the national provincial championships. As a result, she was unable to compete for much of 2016. She played for Central Pulse from 2017 to 2019, before spending a year with the Waikato Bay of Plenty Magic. She returned to Central Pulse in 2021, swapping to an attacking role, having in the past mainly played in the centre court.

Souness was given a trial for with New Zealand, in 2015, but then suffered her ACL injury. She was finally selected for the team in 2017, playing her first match, against South Africa, in August of that year, and being the 167th woman to play for the national team. By the end of 2021 she had played 14 games, in the wing attack (WA) and centre (C) positions. Souness was a member of the Silver Ferns 2022 Commonwealth Games Team that won Bronze after defeating England.

When not playing netball, Souness works as a DJ.
