= 2022 Northern Mystics season =

Northern Mystics season

Northern Mystics
- 2022 season
- Head coach: Helene Wilson
- Asst. coach: Rob Wright; Tia Winikerei
- Manager: Meghan Robinson
- Captain: Sulu Fitzpatrick
- Main venue: The Trusts Arena

Season results
- Wins–losses: 9–7
- Regular season: 3rd
- Finals placing: 3rd
- Team colours

Northern Mystics seasons
- ← 2021 2023 →

The 2022 Northern Mystics season saw Northern Mystics compete in the 2022 ANZ Premiership. With a team coached by Helene Wilson, captained by Sulu Fitzpatrick and featuring Grace Nweke, Elisapeta Toeava and Michaela Sokolich-Beatson, Mystics finished third in the regular season, behind Central Pulse and Northern Stars. In the Elimination final, Stars defeated Mystics 63–57.

== Players ==
=== Player movements ===
▲ Gains	▼ Losses
Danielle Binks (Northern Marvels); Monica Falkner (Northern Stars); Grace Namana (Southern Steel); Claire O'Brien (Northern Marvels); Carys Stythe (Northern Marvels)	Ama Agbeze; Kate Burley (Southern Steel); Bailey Mes (Waikato Bay of Plenty Magic); Saviour Tui (Southern Steel)

=== Roster ===
2022 Northern Mystics roster
Players
Coaching staff

Nat.	Name	Position(s)	DoB	Height
(New Zealand)	Danielle Binks	GS		–
(New Zealand)	Tayla Earle	C, WA, WD, GD	22 April 2000 (aged 21)	1.74 m (5 ft 9 in)
(New Zealand)	Monica Falkner	GA, GS	8 April 1996 (aged 25)	1.81 m (5 ft 11 in)
(New Zealand)	Sulu Fitzpatrick (c)	GD, GK	20 August 1992 (aged 29)	1.87 m (6 ft 2 in)
(New Zealand)	Fa'amu Ioane	WD, C	11 March 1996 (aged 26)	1.73 m (5 ft 8 in)
(New Zealand)	Phoenix Karaka	GD, GK, WD	6 November 1993 (aged 28)	1.86 m (6 ft 1 in)
(New Zealand)	Grace Namana	GS, GA	8 May 1999 (aged 22)	1.80 m (5 ft 11 in)
(New Zealand)	Grace Nweke	GS	7 February 2002 (aged 20)	1.93 m (6 ft 4 in)
(Australia)	Claire O'Brien	WA, C	11 March 1997 (aged 25)	1.73 m (5 ft 8 in)
(New Zealand)	Michaela Sokolich-Beatson (vc)	GD, WD, GK	2 October 1996 (aged 25)	1.84 m (6 ft 0 in)
(New Zealand)	Elisapeta Toeava	WA, C	10 March 1994 (aged 28)	1.61 m (5 ft 3 in)
(New Zealand)	Greer Sinclair^{1} (TRP)	GK, GD, WD	26 September 2000 (aged 21)	1.82 m (6 ft 0 in)
(New Zealand)	Carys Stythe	GD, GK	19 June 2003 (aged 18)	1.92 m (6 ft 4 in)
(New Zealand)	Filda Vui	GS, GA, WA	16 April 1996 (aged 25)	1.80 m (5 ft 11 in)

Head coach

- Helene Wilson

Assistant coach

- Rob Wright
  Tia Winikerei

Manager:
Meghan Robinson
Physiotherapist:
Pat Hunt
Strength and conditioning:
Pera Gibbs

Notes

- (c) – Captain
- (cc) – Co-captain
- (vc) – Vice-captain
- – Injury / maternity leave
- (TRP) – Temporary Replacement Player

Notes

- ^1 Greer Sinclair, a Northern Stars training partner, played for Mystics in the Round 1 match against Waikato Bay of Plenty Magic. She subsequently played for four teams during the season. As well as played for Northern Comets in the National Netball League, she also played for Stars, Mystics and Magic in the ANZ Premiership.

== Regular season ==
=== Fixtures and results ===
Round 1

Sun 13 Mar	Waikato Bay of Plenty Magic	46–43	Northern Mystics	Globox Arena
2.10pm	Ivana Rowland 26/30 (87%); Bailey Mes 10/11 (91%); Brooke Leaver 10/15 (67%)	Report; Stats	Filda Vui 26/32 (81%); Monica Falkner 17/17 (100%)

Round 2

Sat 19 Mar	Central Pulse	60–66	Northern Mystics	Te Rauparaha Arena
4.10pm	Aliyah Dunn 45/49 (92%); Tiana Metuarau 15/19 (79%)	Report; Stats	Grace Nweke 49/51 (96%); Monica Falkner 11/16 (69%); Filda Vui 6/7 (86%)

Mon 21 Mar	Southern Steel	50–70	Northern Mystics	Stadium Southland
7.15pm	George Fisher 24/28 (86%); Saviour Tui 19/25 (76%); Georgia Heffernan 7/10 (70%)	Report; Stats	Grace Nweke 50/52 (96%); Monica Falkner 10/12 (83%); Filda Vui 10/11 (91%)

Round 3

Sun 27 Mar	Northern Mystics	62–61	Central Pulse	The Trusts Arena
2.10pm	Grace Nweke 55/60 (92%); Filda Vui 4/6 (67%); Monica Falkner 3/8 (38%)	Report; Stats	Aliyah Dunn 38/41 (93%); Tiana Metuarau 23/30 (77%)

Round 4

Sat 2 Apr	Northern Mystics	67–59	Southern Steel	The Trusts Arena
4.10pm	Grace Nweke 52/61 (85%); Bailey Mes 6/9 (67%); Filda Vui 0/2 (0%)	Report	George Fisher 47/52 (90%); Tiana Metuarau 16/19 (84%)

Sun 3 Apr	Northern Mystics	^{(Note 2)}	Mainland Tactix	The Trusts Arena
2.10pm		Report

Round 5

Sun 10 Apr	Mainland Tactix	^{(Note 2)}	Northern Mystics	Cowles Stadium, Christchurch
2.10pm		Report

Round 6

Sun 17 Apr	Southern Steel	64–59	Northern Mystics	Stadium Southland
4.10pm	George Fisher 41/45 (91%); Saviour Tui 12/13 (92%); Georgia Heffernan 11/19 (58%)	Report; Stats	Grace Nweke 50/59 (85%); Filda Vui 9/13 (69%)

Round 7

Sun 24 Apr	Northern Mystics	68–44	Northern Stars	The Trusts Arena
4.10pm	Grace Nweke 59/66 (89%); Monica Falkner 5/7 (71%); Filda Vui 4/6 (67%)	Report; Stats	Amorangi Malesala 24/30 (80%); Maia Wilson 13/21 (62%); Jamie Hume 7/13 (54%)

Round 8

Mon 2 May	Northern Mystics	56–44	Waikato Bay of Plenty Magic	Eventfinda Stadium
7.15pm	Grace Nweke 47/50 (94%); Monica Falkner 6/11 (55%); Filda Vui 3/5 (60%)	Report; Stats	Bailey Mes 20/31 (65%); Ivana Rowland 20/24 (83%); Eseta Autagavaia 4/4 (100%)

Round 9

Sat 7 May	Northern Mystics	70–51	Mainland Tactix	Pulman Arena
2.10pm	Grace Nweke 45/49 (92%); Filda Vui 17/19 (89%); Monica Falkner 8/11 (73%)	Report; Stats	Ellie Bird 23/29 (79%); Te Paea Selby-Rickit 22/27 (81%); Hannah Glen 5/7 (71%); Vika Koloto 1/1 (100%)

Sun 8 May	Northern Stars	51–54	Northern Mystics	Pulman Arena
4.10pm	Maia Wilson 20/28 (71%); Jamie Hume 17/24 (71%); Amorangi Malesala 14/16 (88%)	Report; Stats	Grace Nweke 49/55 (89%); Monica Falkner 3/6 (50%); Filda Vui 2/3 (67%)

Round 10

Sat 14 May	Mainland Tactix	58–69	Northern Mystics	Christchurch Arena
	Ellie Bird 38/40 (95%); Te Paea Selby-Rickit 20/24 (83%)	Report; Stats	Grace Nweke 52/55 (95%); Monica Falkner 10/13 (77%); Filda Vui 7/12 (58%)

Mon 16 May	Northern Mystics	47–48	Waikato Bay of Plenty Magic	The Trusts Arena
7.15pm	Filda Vui 29/34 (85%); Monica Falkner 16/19 (84%); Danielle Binks 2/3 (67%)	Report; Stats	Bailey Mes 29/39 (74%); Ameliaranne Ekenasio 19/26 (73%)

Round 11

Sat 21 May	Northern Mystics	49–54	Mainland Tactix	The Trusts Arena
2.10pm	Filda Vui 28/35 (80%); Monica Falkner 18/20 (90%); Grace Namana 3/4 (75%)	Report; Stats	Ellie Bird 34/35 (97%); Te Paea Selby-Rickit 20/22 (91%)

Sun 22 May	Northern Stars	59–38	Northern Mystics	Pulman Arena
2.10pm	Maia Wilson 37/47 (79%); Jamie Hume 18/28 (64%); Amorangi Malesala 4/7 (57%)	Report; Stats	Monica Falkner 14/17 (82%); Filda Vui 14/19 (74%); Grace Namana 9/11 (82%); Phoenix Karaka 1/1 (100%); Danielle Binks 0/1 (0%)

Round 12

Sat 28 May	Northern Mystics	^{(Note 2)}	Central Pulse	The Trusts Arena
4.10pm		Report

Round 13

Fri 3 Jun	Northern Mystics	40–58	Central Pulse	The Trusts Arena
7.10pm	Grace Namana 32/37 (86%); Monica Falkner 5/6 (83%); Filda Vui 2/2 (100%); Phoenix Karaka 1/3 (33%)	Report; Stats	Aliyah Dunn 37/41 (90%); Tiana Metuarau 17/21 (81%); Amelia Walmsley 3/4 (75%); Renee Matoe 1/2 (50%)

Notes

- ^2 Matches postponed under the ANZ Premiership's COVID-19 Match Postponement Policy.

=== Final standings ===
2022 ANZ Premiership ladder
Pos	Team	P	W	D	L	GF	GA	GD	G%	BP	Pts
1	Central Pulse	15	10	0	5	828	732	96	113.1%	4	34
2	Northern Stars	15	11	0	4	836	783	53	106.8%	1	34
3	Northern Mystics	15	9	0	6	858	807	51	106.3%	4	31
4	Southern Steel	15	6	0	9	853	898	-45	95%	2	20
5	Waikato Bay of Plenty Magic	15	4	0	11	733	803	-70	91.3%	4	16
6	Mainland Tactix	15	5	0	10	788	873	-85	90.3%	1	16
Last updated: 12 August 2022

Qualified for Grand final
Qualified for Elimination final

== Finals series ==
=== Elimination final ===
8 June 2022	Northern Stars	63–57	Northern Mystics	Pulman Arena	Sky Sport
8 June 2022	Scoring by quarter: 16–10, 33–23, 48–43, 63–57			Pulman Arena	Sky Sport
8 June 2022	Maia Wilson 42/44 (95%); Jamie Hume 21/25 (84%)		Grace Nweke 45/49 (92%); Grace Namana 8/8 (100%); Monica Falkner 4/6 (67%)	Pulman Arena	Sky Sport

== Award winners ==
=== New Zealand Netball Awards ===
Award	Winner
Dame Lois Muir Supreme Award	Grace Nweke
Silver Ferns Player of the Year	Grace Nweke

Notes

- ^4 Grace Nweke shared the Dame Lois Muir Supreme Award with Kelly Jury (Central Pulse).

=== Team of the season ===
Grace Nweke was included in Brendon Egan's Stuff's team of the season.

Stuff Super Seven

Positions	Player
GS	Grace Nweke

=== Mystics Awards ===
Award	Winner
Fans Choice	Elisapeta Toeava
Manawaroa	Sulu Fitzpatrick
Mystics Mana	Michaela Sokolich-Beatson
He Kakano	Carys Stythe
MVP	Sulu Fitzpatrick
