= 2021 Northern Mystics season =

Northern Mystics season

Northern Mystics
- 2021 season
- Head coach: Helene Wilson
- Asst. coach: Rob Wright; Tia Winikerei
- Manager: Meghan Robinson
- Captain: Sulu Fitzpatrick
- Main venue: The Trusts Arena

Season results
- Wins–losses: 11–4
- Regular season: 1st
- Finals placing: 1st
- Team colours

Northern Mystics seasons
- ← 2020 2022 →

The 2021 Northern Mystics season saw Northern Mystics compete in the 2021 ANZ Premiership. With a team coached by Helene Wilson, captained by Sulu Fitzpatrick and featuring Ama Agbeze, Bailey Mes and Grace Nweke, Mystics won their first ever premiership. After finishing the regular season as minor premiers, they defeated Mainland Tactix 61–59 in the grand final.

== Players ==
=== Player movements ===
| ▲ Gains | ▼ Losses |
|---|---|
| Ama Agbeze; Kate Burley (Northern Stars); Fa'amu Ioane (Northern Stars); Claire O'Brien; Filda Vui (Northern Marvels) | Emma Iversen; Asher Grapes; Emily Burgess; Courtney Elliott |

=== Roster ===
2021 Northern Mystics roster
Players
Coaching staff

| Nat. | Name | Position(s) | DoB | Height |
|---|---|---|---|---|
| (England) | Ama Agbeze (TRP) | GD, GK, WD | 12 November 1982 (aged 38) | 1.84 m (6 ft 0 in) |
| (New Zealand) | Kate Burley | GD, GK | 23 April 1997 (aged 23) | 1.81 m (5 ft 11 in) |
| (New Zealand) | Tayla Earle | C, WA, WD, GD | 22 April 2000 (aged 20) | 1.74 m (5 ft 9 in) |
| (New Zealand) | Sulu Fitzpatrick (c) | GD, GK | 20 August 1992 (aged 28) | 1.87 m (6 ft 2 in) |
| (New Zealand) | Fa'amu Ioane | WD, C | 11 March 1996 (aged 25) | 1.73 m (5 ft 8 in) |
| (New Zealand) | Phoenix Karaka (injured) | GD, GK, WD | 6 November 1993 (aged 27) | 1.86 m (6 ft 1 in) |
| (New Zealand) | Bailey Mes | GA, GS | 27 May 1989 (aged 31) | 1.81 m (5 ft 11 in) |
| (New Zealand) | Grace Nweke | GS | 7 February 2002 (aged 19) | 1.93 m (6 ft 4 in) |
| (Australia) | Claire O'Brien | WA, C | 11 March 1997 (aged 24) | 1.73 m (5 ft 8 in) |
| (New Zealand) | Michaela Sokolich-Beatson (injured) | GD, WD, GK | 2 October 1996 (aged 24) | 1.84 m (6 ft 0 in) |
| (New Zealand) | Elisapeta Toeava | WA, C | 10 March 1994 (aged 27) | 1.61 m (5 ft 3 in) |
| (New Zealand) | Saviour Tui | GS, GA | 17 October 2001 (aged 19) | 1.89 m (6 ft 2 in) |
| (New Zealand) | Filda Vui | GS, GA, WA | 16 April 1996 (aged 25) | 1.80 m (5 ft 11 in) |

Head coach

- Helene Wilson

Assistant coach

- Rob Wright
  Tia Winikerei

Manager:
Meghan Robinson
Physiotherapist:
Pat Hunt
Strength and conditioning:
Kieran Griffiths

Notes

- (c) – Captain
- (cc) – Co-captain
- (vc) – Vice-captain
- – Injury / maternity leave
- (TRP) – Temporary Replacement Player

== Pre-season ==
=== Otaki tournament ===
Northern Mystics participated in the official ANZ Premiership tournament at Te Wānanga o Raukawa in Otaki between 26 and 28 March. All six ANZ Premiership teams took part.

| Fri 26 Mar | Waikato Bay of Plenty Magic | 40–32 | Northern Mystics | Te Wānanga o Raukawa |
| 12.00pm |

| Sat 27 Mar | Mainland Tactix | 64–56 | Northern Mystics | Te Wānanga o Raukawa |
| 9:00am |

| Sat 27 Mar | Northern Mystics | 66–57 | Southern Steel | Te Wānanga o Raukawa |
| 5:00pm |

| Sun 28 Mar | Central Pulse | 55–53 | Northern Mystics | Te Wānanga o Raukawa |
| 2:00 pm |

== Regular season ==
=== Fixtures and results ===
Round 1

| Mon 19 Apr | Northern Mystics | 60–64 | Waikato Bay of Plenty Magic | The Trusts Arena |
| 7.15pm | Grace Nweke 36/41 (88%); Bailey Mes 6/9 (67%); Filda Vui 5/6 (83%) | Report; Stats | Caitlin Bassett 36/41 (88%); Chiara Semple 16/22 (73%); Khiarna Williams 12/14 (86%) |

Round 2

| Sat 24 Apr | Northern Mystics | 64–58 | Southern Steel | Eventfinda Stadium |
| 5.15pm | Grace Nweke 56/60 (93%); Bailey Mes 8/9 (89%) | Report; Stats | George Fisher 42/42 (100%); Tiana Metuarau 16/21 (76%) |

Round 3

| Mon 3 May | Northern Mystics | 53–52 | Mainland Tactix | The Trusts Arena |
| 7.15pm | Grace Nweke 49/56 (88%); Bailey Mes 4/8 (50%) | Report; Stats | Ellie Bird 39/45 (87%); Te Paea Selby-Rickit 10/18 (56%); Jess Prosser 3/6 (50%) |

Round 4

| Mon 10 May | Central Pulse | 47–58 | Northern Mystics | TSB Bank Arena |
| 7.15pm | Aliyah Dunn 27/34 (79%); Te Amo Amaru-Tibble 18/24 (75%); Whitney Souness 2/4 (50%) | Report; Stats | Grace Nweke 51/55 (93%); Bailey Mes 5/7 (71%); Saviour Tui 2/3 (67%) |

Round 5

| Mon 17 May | Mainland Tactix | 64–63 | Northern Mystics | Christchurch Arena |
| 6.15pm | Ellie Bird 44/53 (83%); Te Paea Selby-Rickit 20/29 (69%) | Report; Stats | Grace Nweke 59/64 (92%); Bailey Mes 4/9 (44%) |

Round 6

| Mon 24 May | Waikato Bay of Plenty Magic | 59–67 | Northern Mystics | Trustpower Baypark Arena |
| 8.15pm | Caitlin Bassett 26/28 (93%); Khiarna Williams 30/36 (83%); Chiara Semple 3/3 (100%) | Report; Stats | Grace Nweke 47/55 (85%); Bailey Mes 8/13 (62%); Filda Vui 12/14 (86%) |

Round 7

| Sun 30 May | Northern Mystics | 58–63 | Southern Steel | The Trusts Arena |
| 4.00pm | Grace Nweke 52/61 (85%); Bailey Mes 6/9 (67%); Filda Vui 0/2 (0%) | Report; Stats | George Fisher 47/52 (90%); Tiana Metuarau 16/19 (84%) |

Round 8

| Sun 6 Jun | Northern Mystics | 63–60 | Northern Stars | The Trusts Arena |
| 6.15pm | Grace Nweke 60/64 (94%); Bailey Mes 3/3 (100%) | Report; Stats | Maia Wilson 34/38 (89%); Jamie Hume 10/15 (67%); Amorangi Malesala 16/17 (94%) |

Round 9

| Mon 14 Jun | Waikato Bay of Plenty Magic | 63–68 | Northern Mystics | Claudelands Arena |
| | Caitlin Bassett 36/41 (88%); Chiara Semple 17/20 (85%); Khiarna Williams 10/14 (71%) | Report; Stats | Grace Nweke 57/61 (93%); Filda Vui 8/11 (73%); Bailey Mes 3/5 (60%) |

Round 10

| Sun 20 Jun | Northern Mystics | 64–51 | Central Pulse | The Trusts Arena |
| 2.15 pm | Grace Nweke 54/63 (86%); Bailey Mes 2/9 (22%); Saviour Tui 2/3 (67%) | Report; Stats | Aliyah Dunn 31/39 (79%); Te Amo Amaru-Tibble 16/20 (80%); Whitney Souness 4/7 (57%) |

Round 11

| Sun 27 Jun | Northern Stars | 57–65 | Northern Mystics | Pulman Arena |
| 6.15pm | Maia Wilson 35/41 (85%); Amorangi Malesala 22/27 (81%) | Report; Stats | Grace Nweke 55/59 (93%); Bailey Mes 3/4 (75%); Filda Vui 7/8 (88%) |

Round 12

| Sun 4 Jul | Northern Mystics | 69–61 | Northern Stars | The Trusts Arena |
| 4.15pm | Grace Nweke 54/65 (83%); Filda Vui 11/14 (79%); Bailey Mes 4/9 (44%) | Report; Stats | Maia Wilson 40/46 (87%); Amorangi Malesala 20/33 (61%); Monica Falkner 1/1 (100%) |

Round 13

| Sun 11 Jul | Southern Steel | 61–58 | Northern Mystics | Stadium Southland |
| 6.15pm | George Fisher 39/41 (95%); Tiana Metuarau 22/46 (48%) | Report; Stats | Grace Nweke 50/57 (88%); Filda Vui 6/6 (100%); Bailey Mes 2/3 (67%) |

Round 14

| Sun 18 Jul | Central Pulse | 54–56 | Northern Mystics | TSB Bank Arena |
| 6.15pm | Aliyah Dunn 31/36 (86%); Te Amo Amaru-Tibble 18/26 (69%); Ivana Rowland 5/10 (50%) | Report; Stats | Grace Nweke 52/61 (85%); Filda Vui 2/3 (67%); Bailey Mes 2/5 (40%) |

Round 15

| Sun 25 Jul | Mainland Tactix | 59–63 | Northern Mystics | Christchurch Arena |
| | Ellie Bird 42/44 (95%); Te Paea Selby-Rickit 17/25 (68%) | Report; Stats | Grace Nweke 49/51 (96%); Filda Vui 11/13 (85%); Saviour Tui 2/2 (100%); Bailey Mes 1/1 (100%) |

=== Final standings ===
2021 ANZ Premiership ladder
| Pos | Team | P | W | D | L | GF | GA | GD | G% | BP | Pts |
| 1 | Northern Mystics | 15 | 11 | 0 | 4 | 929 | 873 | 56 | 106.4% | 4 | 37 |
| 2 | Southern Steel | 15 | 11 | 0 | 4 | 818 | 801 | 17 | 102.1% | 0 | 33 |
| 3 | Mainland Tactix | 15 | 9 | 0 | 6 | 801 | 775 | 26 | 103.4% | 4 | 31 |
| 4 | Northern Stars | 15 | 9 | 0 | 6 | 825 | 791 | 34 | 104.3% | 2 | 29 |
| 5 | Central Pulse | 15 | 4 | 0 | 11 | 789 | 810 | -21 | 97.4% | 8 | 20 |
| 6 | Waikato Bay of Plenty Magic | 15 | 1 | 0 | 14 | 802 | 914 | -112 | 87.7% | 7 | 10 |
Last updated: 9 August 2022

Qualified for Grand final
Qualified for Elimination final

== Finals series ==
=== Grand final ===
| Sun 8 Aug | Stats | Northern Mystics | 61–59 | Mainland Tactix | Spark Arena; Attendance: 5,000 | SKYSport |
| Sun 8 Aug | Stats | Scoring by quarter: 17–14, 33–28, 48–46, 61–59 | | | Spark Arena; Attendance: 5,000 | SKYSport |
| Sun 8 Aug | Stats | Grace Nweke 58/62 (94%); Filda Vui 2/3 (67%); Bailey Mes 1/1 (100%) | | Ellie Bird 38/44 (86%); Te Paea Selby-Rickit 21/39 (54%) | Spark Arena; Attendance: 5,000 | SKYSport |

== Award winners ==
=== New Zealand Netball Awards ===
| Award | Winner |
|---|---|
| Dame Lois Muir Supreme Award | Sulu Fitzpatrick |
| ANZ Premiership Coach of the Year | Helene Wilson |
| National Netball League Player of the Year | Saviour Tui |

=== ANZ Premiership Awards ===
| Award | Winner |
|---|---|
| Grand Final MVP | Elisapeta Toeava |

=== Mystics Awards ===
| Award | Winner |
|---|---|
| Fans Choice | Sulu Fitzpatrick |
| Manawaroa | Elisapeta Toeava |
| Mystics Mana | Fa'amu Ioane |
| Barfoot & Thompson MVP | Grace Nweke/Elisapeta Toeava |

== Northern Marvels ==
In 2021 Northern Marvels, the Mystics reserve team, were National Netball League premiers, defeating Northern Comets 64–56 in the grand final at The Trusts Arena. Mystics players Claire O'Brien, Filda Vui and Saviour Tui all regularly played for Marvels during the NNL season. Tui was named the NNL's 2021 Player of the Year.
