= 2022 Constellation Cup =

International netball series

Tournament details
- Host countries: Australia; New Zealand
- Dates: 12–23 October 2022

Final positions
- Champions: Australia (10th title)
- Runner-up: New Zealand

Tournament statistics
- Matches played: 4
- Top scorer(s): Grace Nweke; 146/153 (95%)

The 2022 Constellation Cup was the 12th Constellation Cup series between Australia and New Zealand. The series was held in October 2022 across four netball test matches, with two matches each held in New Zealand and Australia. New Zealand were the defending holders of the cup, having defeated Australia by three games to one in 2021.

New Zealand won the first two tests and led 2–0 going into the third test. However, Australia won the third and fourth tests to level the series at 2–2. Australia were declared the winners to regain the Constellation Cup for the tenth time because, having scored 215 goals compared to New Zealand's 208, they had a better aggregate score over the series.

== Squads ==
=== Australia ===
Australia roster
Players
Coaches

Name	Pos	DOB	Height	Club	Nat	Caps
Sunday Aryang	GD	25 December 2000 (aged 21)	1.82 m (6 ft 0 in)	West Coast Fever	(Australia)	8
Kiera Austin	GS, GA, WA	26 August 1997 (aged 25)	1.85 m (6 ft 1 in)	Melbourne Vixens	(Australia)	9
Ruby Bakewell-Doran^{4}	GD	21 September 1999 (aged 23)	1.84 m (6 ft 0 in)	Queensland Firebirds	(Australia)	0
Courtney Bruce	GK, GD	8 December 1993 (aged 28)	1.89 m (6 ft 2 in)	West Coast Fever	(Australia)	50
Gretel Bueta^{1}	GA, GS	3 July 1993 (aged 29)	1.91 m (6 ft 3 in)	Queensland Firebirds	(Australia)	47
Sophie Dwyer^{4}	GA	5 December 2001 (aged 20)	1.83 m (6 ft 0 in)	Giants Netball	(Australia)	0
Sophie Garbin^{2}	GS, GA	6 April 1997 (aged 25)	1.84 m (6 ft 0 in)	Collingwood Magpies	(Australia)	3
Sarah Klau	GK, GD	30 September 1994 (aged 28)	1.90 m (6 ft 3 in)	New South Wales Swifts	(Australia)	23
Cara Koenen	GS, GA	27 February 1996 (aged 26)	1.90 m (6 ft 3 in)	Sunshine Coast Lightning	(Australia)	12
Kate Moloney	WD, C, WA	8 January 1993 (aged 29)	1.77 m (5 ft 10 in)	Melbourne Vixens	(Australia)	18
Amy Parmenter^{3}	WD	1 August 1997 (aged 25)	1.76 m (5 ft 9 in)	Giants Netball	(Australia)	0
Jamie-Lee Price	WD, C	10 January 1996 (aged 26)	1.79 m (5 ft 10 in)	Giants Netball	(Australia)	20
Maddy Proud^{4}	WA, C	4 December 1993 (aged 28)	1.74 m (5 ft 9 in)	New South Wales Swifts	(Australia)	0
Liz Watson (c)	WA, C	30 March 1994 (aged 28)	1.78 m (5 ft 10 in)	Melbourne Vixens	(Australia)	57
Joanna Weston^{5}	GD, WD, GK	14 February 1994 (aged 28)	1.88 m (6 ft 2 in)	Melbourne Vixens	(Australia)	51
Stephanie Wood (vc)	GA, GS	28 November 1991 (aged 30)	1.75 m (5 ft 9 in)	Sunshine Coast Lightning	(Australia)	40

Head coach

- Stacey Marinkovich

Assistant coach

- Nicole Richardson

Manager: Kerry Leech
Physiotherapist: Alanna Antcliff
Strength and conditioning: Tan scott

Notes

- (c) – Captain
- (cc) – Co-captain
- (vc) – Vice-captain
- – Injury / maternity leave
- (TRP) – Temporary Replacement Player

Notes

- ^1 Gretel Bueta withdrew from the squad on 4 October 2022 after announcing her pregnancy.
- ^2 Sophie Garbin was added to the squad on 10 October 2022 to replace Gretel Bueta.
- ^3 Amy Parmenter made her international debut in the first match of this series.
- ^4 Maddy Proud, Sophie Dwyer and Ruby Bakewell-Doran all made their international debuts in the second match of this series.
- ^5 Joanna Weston was added to the squad on 18 October 2022 due to injury to Sunday Aryang.

=== New Zealand ===
New Zealand roster
Players
Coaches

Name	Pos	DOB	Height	Club	Nat	Caps
Ameliaranne Ekenasio (c)	GA, GS	11 January 1991 (aged 31)	1.86 m (6 ft 1 in)	Central Pulse	(New Zealand)	53
Sulu Tone-Fitzpatrick^{1}	GK, GD, WD	20 August 1992 (aged 30)	1.88 m (6 ft 2 in)	Northern Mystics	(New Zealand)	25
Maddy Gordon^{2}	C, WA, WD	16 January 2000 (aged 22)	1.74 m (5 ft 9 in)	Central Pulse	(New Zealand)	6
Kate Heffernan	WD, C, WA	7 October 1999 (aged 23)	1.81 m (5 ft 11 in)	Southern Steel	(New Zealand)	11
Kayla Johnson	GD, WD, C	13 February 1992 (aged 30)	1.83 m (6 ft 0 in)	Northern Stars	(New Zealand)	61
Kelly Jury	GK, GD	22 October 1996 (aged 25)	1.92 m (6 ft 4 in)	Central Pulse	(New Zealand)	43
Phoenix Karaka	GK, GD	6 November 1993 (aged 28)	1.86 m (6 ft 1 in)	Northern Mystics	(New Zealand)	47
Grace Nweke	GS	7 February 2002 (aged 20)	1.93 m (6 ft 4 in)	Northern Mystics	(New Zealand)	17
Kimiora Poi^{2}	C, WA	1 November 1997 (aged 24)	1.68 m (5 ft 6 in)	Mainland Tactix	(New Zealand)	10
Mila Reuelu-Buchanan^{1}	C, WA	11 May 1998 (aged 24)	1.73 m (5 ft 8 in)	Northern Stars	(New Zealand)	3
Te Paea Selby-Rickit	GA, GS	14 January 1992 (aged 30)	1.88 m (6 ft 2 in)	Mainland Tactix	(New Zealand)	58
Whitney Souness	WA, C	12 October 1995 (aged 27)	1.74 m (5 ft 9 in)	Central Pulse	(New Zealand)	27
Peta Toeava^{1}	C, WA	10 March 1994 (aged 28)	1.61 m (5 ft 3 in)	Northern Mystics	(New Zealand)	5
Elle Temu^{2}	GK, GD	3 August 1998 (aged 24)	1.87 m (6 ft 2 in)	Northern Stars	(New Zealand)	4
Maia Wilson	GS, GA	21 September 1997 (aged 25)	1.87 m (6 ft 2 in)	Northern Stars	(New Zealand)	36

Head coach

- Noeline Taurua

Assistant coach

- Debbie Fuller

Manager: Esther Molloy
Physiotherapist: Mark Overington
Trainer: Keir Hansen
Strength and conditioning: Guy Mothersole

Notes

- (c) – Captain
- (cc) – Co-captain
- (vc) – Vice-captain
- – Injury / maternity leave
- (TRP) – Temporary Replacement Player

Notes

- ^1 Sulu Tone-Fitzpatrick, Mila Reuelu-Buchanan, and Peta Toeava were only selected for the first two matches played in New Zealand.
- ^2 Maddy Gordon, Kimiora Poi, and Elle Temu were only selected for the final two matches played in Australia.

== Match officials ==
=== Umpires ===
Umpire	Association
Gary Burgess	England
Louise Travis	England
Anso Kemp	South Africa
Kate Mann	England

=== Umpire Appointments Panel ===
Umpire	Association
Sharon Kelly	Australia
Fay Meiklejohn	New Zealand

== Matches ==
=== First test ===
12 October 2022; 7:30 pm NZDT (UTC+13:00)	Stats	New Zealand	56–48	Australia	Spark Arena	Sky Sport; Foxtel
12 October 2022; 7:30 pm NZDT (UTC+13:00)	Stats	Scoring by quarter: 20–9, 11–14, 11–13, 14–12			Spark Arena	Sky Sport; Foxtel
12 October 2022; 7:30 pm NZDT (UTC+13:00)	Stats	Grace Nweke 40/42 (95%); Ameliaranne Ekenasio 16/19 (84%)		Cara Koenen 21/22 (95%); Stephanie Wood 11/16 (69%); Kiera Austin 9/14 (64%); Sophie Garbin 7/9 (78%)	Spark Arena	Sky Sport; Foxtel

=== Second test ===
16 October 2022; 7:30 pm NZDT (UTC+13:00)	Stats	New Zealand	52–48	Australia	Trustpower Arena	Sky Sport; Foxtel
16 October 2022; 7:30 pm NZDT (UTC+13:00)	Stats	Scoring by quarter: 12–13, 12–12, 15–9, 12–13			Trustpower Arena	Sky Sport; Foxtel
16 October 2022; 7:30 pm NZDT (UTC+13:00)	Stats	Grace Nweke 37/37 (100%); Ameliaranne Ekenasio 15/19 (79%)		Cara Koenen 21/25 (84%); Stephanie Wood 21/23 (91%); Sophie Dwyer 6/7 (86%)	Trustpower Arena	Sky Sport; Foxtel

=== Third test ===
19 October 2022; 7:30 pm AEDT (UTC+11)	Stats	Australia	62–47	New Zealand	John Cain Arena; Attendance: 9,502	Sky Sport; Foxtel
19 October 2022; 7:30 pm AEDT (UTC+11)	Stats	Scoring by quarter: 15–11, 16–11, 15–16, 16–9			John Cain Arena; Attendance: 9,502	Sky Sport; Foxtel
19 October 2022; 7:30 pm AEDT (UTC+11)	Stats	Sophie Garbin 34/38 (89%); Stephanie Wood 28/35 (80%)		Grace Nweke 30/31 (97%); Te Paea Selby-Rickit 7/7 (100%); Ameliaranne Ekenasio 6/7 (86%); Maia Wilson 4/4 (100%)	John Cain Arena; Attendance: 9,502	Sky Sport; Foxtel

=== Fourth test ===
23 October 2022; 6:30 pm AEST (UTC+10)	Stats	Australia	57–53	New Zealand	Gold Coast Convention and Exhibition Centre	Sky Sport; Foxtel
23 October 2022; 6:30 pm AEST (UTC+10)	Stats	Scoring by quarter: 13–16, 12–14, 19–8, 13–15			Gold Coast Convention and Exhibition Centre	Sky Sport; Foxtel
23 October 2022; 6:30 pm AEST (UTC+10)	Stats	Sophie Garbin 36/39 (92%); Stephanie Wood 21/27 (78%)		Grace Nweke 39/43 (91%); Ameliaranne Ekenasio 14/15 (93%)	Gold Coast Convention and Exhibition Centre	Sky Sport; Foxtel
