= 2023 Northern Mystics season =

Northern Mystics season

Northern Mystics
- 2023 season
- Head coach: Tia Winikerei
- Asst. coach: Rob Wright
- Manager: Meghan Robinson
- Captain: Sulu Fitzpatrick
- Main venue: The Trusts Arena

Season results
- Wins–losses: 12–4
- Regular season: 1st
- Finals placing: 1st
- Team colours

Northern Mystics seasons
- ← 2022 2024 →

The 2023 Northern Mystics season saw Northern Mystics compete in the 2023 ANZ Premiership. With a team coached by Tia Winikerei, captained by Sulu Fitzpatrick and featuring Phoenix Karaka, Grace Nweke, Michaela Sokolich-Beatson and Peta Toeava, Northern Mystics won their second title. Mystics finished the regular season as minor premiers, finishing above Central Pulse and Northern Stars. Mystics defeated Stars 74–56 in the Grand final.

== Players ==
=== Player movements ===
▲ Gains	▼ Losses
Catherine Hall (Northern Marvels); Holly Mather (Northern Marvels); Katie Te Ao (Waikato Bay of Plenty NNL)	Fa'amu Ioane (Central Pulse); Grace Namana (Severn Stars)

=== Roster ===
2023 Northern Mystics roster
Players
Coaching staff

Nat.	Name	Position(s)	DoB	Height
(New Zealand)	Danielle Binks	GS		–
(New Zealand)	Tayla Earle	C, WA, WD, GD	22 April 2000 (aged 22)	1.74 m (5 ft 9 in)
(New Zealand)	Monica Falkner (injured)	GA, GS	8 April 1996 (aged 26)	1.81 m (5 ft 11 in)
(New Zealand)	Sulu Fitzpatrick (c)	GD, GK	20 August 1992 (aged 30)	1.87 m (6 ft 2 in)
(New Zealand)	Catherine Hall	GK,GD	16 December 2003 (aged 19)	1.91 m (6 ft 3 in)
(New Zealand)	Phoenix Karaka	GD, GK, WD	6 November 1993 (aged 29)	1.86 m (6 ft 1 in)
(New Zealand)	Holly Mather			–
(New Zealand)	Grace Nweke	GS	7 February 2002 (aged 21)	1.93 m (6 ft 4 in)
(Australia)	Claire O'Brien^{1} (TRP)	WA, C	11 March 1997 (aged 25)	1.73 m (5 ft 8 in)
(New Zealand)	Michaela Sokolich-Beatson (vc)	GD, WD, GK	2 October 1996 (aged 26)	1.84 m (6 ft 0 in)
(New Zealand)	Katie Te Ao	WD,C	15 April 2001 (aged 21)	1.80 m (5 ft 11 in)
(New Zealand)	Elisapeta Toeava	WA, C	10 March 1994 (aged 28)	1.61 m (5 ft 3 in)
(New Zealand)	Carys Stythe	GD,GK	19 June 2003 (aged 19)	1.92 m (6 ft 4 in)
(New Zealand)	Filda Vui	GS, GA, WA	16 April 1996 (aged 26)	1.80 m (5 ft 11 in)

Head coach

- Tia Winikerei

Assistant coach

- Rob Wright

Manager:
Meghan Robinson
Physiotherapist:
Pat Hunt
Strength and conditioning:
Pera Gibbs

Notes

- (c) – Captain
- (cc) – Co-captain
- (vc) – Vice-captain
- – Injury / maternity leave
- (TRP) – Temporary Replacement Player

Notes

- ^1 In September 2022, it was announced that Claire O'Brien was leaving Mystics. However she returned as a temporary replacement player for Round 7 following an injury to Tayla Earle. She remained in the squad for the rest of the 2023 season.

=== Milestones ===
- On 6 May 2023, in Round 10 against Southern Steel, Sulu Fitzpatrick made her 150th senior league appearance.

=== Debutants ===
- Mystics #84: Katie Te Ao made her Mystics debut in Round 1 against Southern Steel.
- Mystics #85: Catherine Hall made her Mystics debut in Round 5 against Southern Steel.
- Mystics #86: Holly Mather

== Pre-season ==
=== Otaki tournament ===
Northern Mystics participated in the official ANZ Premiership tournament, hosted by Central Pulse at Te Wānanga o Raukawa in Ōtaki between 17 and 19 February. All six ANZ Premiership teams took part.

Fri Feb 17	Mainland Tactix	54–50	Northern Mystics	Te Wānanga o Raukawa
10.30am

Fri Feb 17	Northern Mystics	50–42	Waikato Bay of Plenty Magic	Te Wānanga o Raukawa
4.30pm

Sat Feb 18	Northern Mystics	48–45	Northern Stars	Te Wānanga o Raukawa
10.30am

Sat Feb 18	Central Pulse	50–54	Northern Mystics	Te Wānanga o Raukawa
6:00pm

Sun Feb 19	Southern Steel	54–42	Northern Mystics	Te Wānanga o Raukawa
9:00am

== Regular season ==
=== Fixtures and results ===
Round 1

Sat 4 Mar	Northern Mystics	64–38	Southern Steel	The Trusts Arena
7:00PM	Grace Nweke 46/48 (96%); Monica Falkner 12/17 (71%); Filda Vui 6/7 (86%)	Report; Stats	Jess Allan 15/19 (79%); Georgia Heffernan 14/19 (74%); Eseta Autagavaia 9/13 (69%)

Round 2

Sun 12 Mar	Mainland Tactix	45–54	Northern Mystics	Christchurch Arena
4:00PM	Aliyah Dunn 24/29 (83%); Te Paea Selby-Rickit 20/26 (77%); Vika Koloto 1/1 (100%)	Report; Stats	Grace Nweke 46/52 (88%); Monica Falkner 4/7 (57%); Filda Vui 4/4 (100%)

Round 3

Sun 19 Mar	Waikato Bay of Plenty Magic	57–56	Northern Mystics	Globox Arena
4:00PM	Bailey Mes 28/39 (72%); Ameliaranne Ekenasio 29/34 (85%)	Report; Stats	Grace Nweke 39/42 (93%); Filda Vui 13/14 (93%)

Round 4

Sun 26 Mar	Northern Mystics	62–59	Northern Stars	The Trusts Arena
4:00PM	Grace Nweke 46/46 (100%); Monica Falkner 15/17 (88%); Filda Vui 1/1 (100%)	Report; Stats	Maia Wilson 32/34 (94%); Amorangi Malesala 19/24 (79%); Jamie Hume 8/14 (57%)

Round 5

Sat 1 Apr	Southern Steel	48–64	Northern Mystics	Edgar Centre
7:00PM	Saviour Tui 22/31 (71%); Eseta Autagavaia 6/7 (86%); Georgia Heffernan 20/29 (69%)	Report; Stats	Grace Nweke 47/48 (98%); Monica Falkner 17/19 (89%); Filda Vui 0/1 (0%)

Mon 3 Apr	Central Pulse	51–56	Northern Mystics	Te Rauparaha Arena
7:00PM	Amelia Walmsley 27/34 (79%); Tiana Metuarau 17/18 (94%); Joyce Mvula 7/7 (100%)	Report; Stats	Grace Nweke 45/48 (94%); Monica Falkner 11/12 (92%)

Round 6

Sun 9 Apr	Waikato Bay of Plenty Magic	61–62	Northern Mystics	Energy Events Centre
2:00PM	Bailey Mes 36/41 (88%); Ameliaranne Ekenasio 25/27 (93%)	Report; Stats	Grace Nweke 50/55 (91%); Monica Falkner 7/8 (88%); Filda Vui 5/6 (83%)

Round 7

Sat 15 Apr	Northern Mystics	53–55	Central Pulse	The Trusts Arena
4:00PM	Grace Nweke 41/45 (91%); Monica Falkner 11/12 (92%); Filda Vui 1/1 (100%)	Report; Stats	Amelia Walmsley 36/50 (72%); Tiana Metuarau 17/19 (89%); Joyce Mvula 2/4 (50%)

Round 8

Sun 23 Apr	Northern Mystics	60–49	Waikato Bay of Plenty Magic	The Trusts Arena
4:00PM	Grace Nweke 50/62 (81%); Filda Vui 10/15 (67%)	Report; Stats	Bailey Mes 24/29 (83%); Ameliaranne Ekenasio 25/29 (86%)

Mon 24 Apr	Northern Mystics	77–79	Northern Stars	The Trusts Arena
7:00PM	Grace Nweke 70/75 (93%); Filda Vui 7/11 (64%)	Report; Stats	Maia Wilson 50/54 (93%); Amorangi Malesala 27/32 (84%); Jamie Hume 2/3 (67%)

Round 9

Sun 30 Apr	Mainland Tactix	77–79	Northern Mystics	Christchurch Arena
2:00PM	Aliyah Dunn; Te Paea Selby-Rickit; Vika Koloto	Report	Grace Nweke 64/66 (97%); Monica Falkner; Filda Vui

Round 10

Sat 6 May	Northern Mystics	65–55	Southern Steel	The Trusts Arena
7:00PM	Grace Nweke 53/58 (91%); Filda Vui 12/16 (75%)	Report; Stats	Saviour Tui 41/51 (80%); Georgia Heffernan 12/17 (71%); Jess Allan 2/3 (67%)

Round 11

Sun 14 May	Central Pulse	62–56	Northern Mystics	TSB Bank Arena
4:00PM	Amelia Walmsley 47/57 (82%); Tiana Metuarau 15/15 (100%)	Report; Stats	Grace Nweke 46/51 (90%); Filda Vui 10/15 (67%)

Round 12

Sun 21 May	Northern Stars	63–58	Northern Mystics	Pulman Arena
2:00PM	Maia Wilson 33/36 (92%); Amorangi Malesala 25/29 (86%)	Report; Stats	Grace Nweke 52/56 (93%); Filda Vui 11/13 (85%)

Mon 22 May	Northern Mystics	64–61	Mainland Tactix	Eventfinda Stadium
7:00PM	Grace Nweke 59/69 (86%); Filda Vui 5/9 (56%)	Report; Stats	Aliyah Dunn 32/33 (97%); Te Paea Selby-Rickit 29/33 (88%)

=== Final standings ===
2023 ANZ Premiership ladder
Pos	Team	P	W	L	GF	GA	GD	G%	BP	Pts
1	Northern Mystics	15	11	4	930	828	102	112.3%	3	36
2	Central Pulse	15	10	5	802	746	56	107.5%	3	33
3	Northern Stars	15	9	6	889	835	54	106.5%	3	30
4	Mainland Tactix	15	9	6	793	760	33	104.3%	1	28
5	Waikato Bay of Plenty Magic	15	6	9	791	830	-39	95.3%	4	22
6	Southern Steel	15	0	15	653	859	-206	76.0%	4	4
Last updated: 7 August 2023

Qualified for Grand final
Qualified for Elimination final

== Finals series ==
=== Grand final ===
4 June 2023	Northern Mystics	74–56	Northern Stars	Globox Arena	Sky Sport
4 June 2023	Scoring by quarter: 21–17, 38–29, 54–45, 74–56			Globox Arena	Sky Sport
4 June 2023	Grace Nweke 70/73 (96%); Filda Vui 3/5 (60%); Danielle Binks 1/1 (100%)		Maia Wilson 38/42 (90%); Amorangi Malesala 17/21 (81%); Jamie Hume 1/3 (33%)	Globox Arena	Sky Sport

== Award winners ==
=== Team of the season ===
Three Mystics players were included in Brendon Egan's Stuff's team of the season.

All Star Seven

Position	Player
GS	Grace Nweke
WD	Michaela Sokolich-Beatson

Bench

Positions	Player
GK, GD	Phoenix Karaka

=== Mystics Awards ===
Award	Winner
MG Motor Fans Choice	Phoenix Karaka
He Kakano	Carys Stythe
Manawaroa	Peta Toeava
Barfoot & Thompson MVP Fitzpatrick Medal	Grace Nweke; Peta Toeava
H Toa Matarau (Supreme Award)	Michaela Sokolich-Beatson
