= 2026 ANZ Premiership season =

Netball league season

- League: ANZ Premiership
- Sport: Netball
- Duration: 11 April – 27 June 2026
- Teams: 6
- TV partner: TVNZ
- Minor premiers: Northern Mystics

Finals
- Champions: Northern Mystics
- Runners-up: Southern Steel

ANZ Premiership seasons
- ← 2025

The 2026 ANZ Premiership season was the tenth season of Netball New Zealand's ANZ Premiership. Northern Mystics won the minor premiership by finishing top of the table at the conclusion of the regular season. In the Elimination final, the Southern Steel defeated the Mainland Tactix 60–54. The Mystics then went on to defeat the Steel 56–46 in the Grand Final.

== Head coaches and captains ==
Team	Head coach	Captain(s)
Central Pulse	Anna Andrews-Tasola	Parris Mason
Mainland Tactix	Donna Wilkins	Erikana Pedersen
Northern Mystics	Tia Winikerei	Michaela Sokolich-Beatson
Northern Stars	Temepara Bailey	Mila Reuelu-Buchanan
Southern Steel	Wendy Frew	Kimiora Poi
Waikato Bay of Plenty Magic	Mary-Jane Araroa	Erena Mikaere; Georgie Edgecumbe

== Final standings ==
2025 ANZ Premiership ladder
Pos	Team	P	W	L	GF	GA	GD	G%	BP	Pts
1	Northern Mystics	10	8	2	551	491	60	112.2%	1	25
2	Southern Steel	10	8	2	571	526	45	108.6%	0	24
3	Mainland Tactix	10	6	4	516	480	36	107.5%	3	21
4	Northern Stars	10	4	6	554	554	0	100.0%	3	15
5	Central Pulse	10	2	8	477	530	-53	90.0%	2	8
6	Waikato Bay of Plenty Magic	10	2	8	448	536	-88	83.6%	1	7
Last updated: 27 September 2026

Qualified for Grand final
Qualified for Elimination final

== Finals series ==
=== Elimination final ===
21 June 2026	Southern Steel	60–54	Mainland Tactix	Stadium Southland	TVNZ

=== Grand final ===
27 June 2026	Northern Mystics	56–46	Southern Steel	The Trusts Arena	TVNZ
