= 2023 ANZ Premiership season =

Netball league season

- League: ANZ Premiership
- Sport: Netball
- Duration: 4 March – 4 June 2023
- Teams: 6
- TV partner: Sky Sport (New Zealand)
- Minor premiers: Northern Mystics
- Season MVP: Maddy Gordon
- Top scorer: Grace Nweke (Northern Mystics)

Finals
- Champions: Northern Mystics
- Runners-up: Northern Stars

ANZ Premiership seasons
- ← 2022 2024 →

The 2023 ANZ Premiership season was the seventh season of Netball New Zealand's ANZ Premiership. With a team coached by Tia Winikerei, captained by Sulu Fitzpatrick and featuring Phoenix Karaka, Grace Nweke, Michaela Sokolich-Beatson and Peta Toeava, Northern Mystics won their second title. Mystics finished the regular season as minor premiers, finishing above Central Pulse and Northern Stars. In the Elimination final, Stars defeated Pulse 53–52. Mystics then defeated Stars 74–56 in the Grand final.

== Transfers ==
Player	2022 team	2023 team
Fa'amu Ioane	Northern Mystics	Central Pulse
Joyce Mvula	Manchester Thunder	Central Pulse
Ainsleyana Puleiata	Central Manawa	Central Pulse
Aliyah Dunn	Central Pulse	Mainland Tactix
Vika Koloto	Mainland NNL	Mainland Tactix
Laura Malcolm	Manchester Thunder	Mainland Tactix
Greer Sinclair	Northern Stars	Mainland Tactix
Katie Te Ao	Waikato Bay of Plenty NNL	Northern Mystics
Kelera Nawai-Caucau	Mainland Tactix	Northern Stars
Samon Nathan	Mainland Tactix	Northern Stars
Lisa Putt	Northern Comets	Northern Stars
Eseta Autagavaia	Stars/Magic	Southern Steel
Courtney Elliott	Central Pulse	Southern Steel
Samantha Winders	Waikato Bay of Plenty Magic	Southern Steel
Amy Christophers	Waikato Bay of Plenty NNL	Waikato Bay of Plenty Magic
Charlotte Elley	Mainland Tactix	Waikato Bay of Plenty Magic
Ellie Bird	Mainland Tactix	Leeds Rhinos
Lisa Mather	Northern Stars	Saracens Mavericks
Grace Namana	Northern Mystics	Severn Stars
Ali Wilshier	Southern Steel	Team Bath

== Head coaches and captains ==
Team	Head coach	Captain
Central Pulse	Yvette McCausland-Durie	Kelly Jury; Tiana Metuarau
Mainland Tactix	Marianne Delaney-Hoshek	Kimiora Poi
Northern Mystics	Tia Winikerei	Sulu Fitzpatrick
Northern Stars	Kiri Wills	Maia Wilson
Southern Steel	Reinga Bloxham	Te Huinga Reo Selby-Rickit
Waikato Bay of Plenty Magic	Mary-Jane Araroa	Ameliaranne Ekenasio

== Pre-season ==
=== Otaki tournament ===
Central Pulse hosted the official ANZ Premiership tournament at Te Wānanga o Raukawa in Otaki between 17 and 19 February. All six ANZ Premiership teams took part. It was the sixth edition of the tournament.

Day 1

Fri Feb 17	Central Pulse	47–48	Waikato Bay of Plenty Magic
09:00am

Fri Feb 17	Mainland Tactix	54–50	Northern Mystics
10.30am

Fri Feb 17	Southern Steel	55–37	Northern Stars
12:00pm

Fri Feb 17	Northern Mystics	50–42	Waikato Bay of Plenty Magic
4.30pm

Fri Feb 17	Central Pulse	39–41	Mainland Tactix
6.00pm

Day 2

Sat Feb 18	Central Pulse	48–44	Southern Steel
9:00am

Sat Feb 18	Northern Mystics	48–45	Northern Stars
10.30am

Sat Feb 18	Southern Steel	39–38	Waikato Bay of Plenty Magic
3:00pm

Sat Feb 18	Mainland Tactix	56–44	Northern Stars
4.30pm

Sat Feb 18	Central Pulse	50–54	Northern Mystics
6:00pm

Day 3

Sun Feb 19	Southern Steel	54–42	Northern Mystics
9:00am

Sun Feb 19	Mainland Tactix	52–36	Waikato Bay of Plenty Magic
10.30am

Sun Feb 19	Central Pulse	46–48	Northern Stars
12:00pm

== Regular season ==
=== Round 1 ===
Sat 4 Mar	Northern Mystics	64–38	Southern Steel	The Trusts Arena
7:00PM	Grace Nweke 46/48 (96%); Monica Falkner 12/17 (71%); Filda Vui 6/7 (86%)	Report; Stats	Jess Allan 15/19 (79%); Georgia Heffernan 14/19 (74%); Eseta Autagavaia 9/13 (69%)

Sun 5 Mar	Central Pulse	53–52	Waikato Bay of Plenty Magic	Fly Palmy Arena
4:00 PM	Amelia Walmsley 36/39 (92%); Tiana Metuarau 17/19 (89%)	Report; Stats	Ameliaranne Ekenasio 27/31 (87%); Bailey Mes 25/30 (83%)

Mon 6 Mar	Northern Stars	49–55	Mainland Tactix	Pulman Arena
7:00 PM	Maia Wilson 34/35 (97%); Amorangi Malesala 12/16 (75%); Jamie Hume 3/7 (43%)	Report; Stats	Aliyah Dunn 39/44 (89%); Te Paea Selby-Rickit 15/18 (83%); Vika Koloto 1/1 (100%)

=== Round 2 ===
Sat 11 Mar	Waikato Bay of Plenty Magic	47–66	Northern Stars	Trustpower Arena
4:00PM	Bailey Mes 27/32 (84%); Ameliaranne Ekenasio 20/23 (87%)	Report; Stats	Maia Wilson 44/48 (92%); Amorangi Malesala 11/14 (79%); Jamie Hume 11/15 (73%)

Sat 11 Mar	Central Pulse	57–37	Southern Steel	TSB Bank Arena
7:00PM	Amelia Walmsley 42/45 (93%); Tiana Metuarau 13/15 (87%); Joyce Mvula 2/3 (67%)	Report; Stats	Georgia Heffernan 20/22 (91%); Jess Allan 13/22 (59%); Meleitia Taupu 4/7 (57%)

Sun 12 Mar	Mainland Tactix	45–54	Northern Mystics	Christchurch Arena
4:00PM	Aliyah Dunn 24/29 (83%); Te Paea Selby-Rickit 20/26 (77%); Vika Koloto 1/1 (100%)	Report; Stats	Grace Nweke 46/52 (88%); Monica Falkner 4/7 (57%); Filda Vui 4/4 (100%)

Mon 13 Mar	Northern Stars	74–40	Southern Steel	Pulman Arena
7:00PM	Maia Wilson 59/61 (97%); Amorangi Malesala 6/7 (86%); Jamie Hume 9/13 (69%)	Report; Stats	Eseta Autagavaia 19/26 (73%); Georgia Heffernan 15/23 (65%); Jess Allan 6/6 (100%)

=== Round 3 ===
Sun 19 Mar	Northern Stars	59–51	Central Pulse	Pulman Arena
2:00PM	Maia Wilson 41/45 (91%); Jamie Hume 18/24 (75%)	Report; Stats	Amelia Walmsley 32/37 (86%); Tiana Metuarau 17/20 (85%); Joyce Mvula 2/3 (67%)

Sun 19 Mar	Waikato Bay of Plenty Magic	57–56	Northern Mystics	Globox Arena
4:00PM	Bailey Mes 28/39 (72%); Ameliaranne Ekenasio 29/34 (85%)	Report; Stats	Grace Nweke 39/42 (93%); Filda Vui 13/14 (93%)

Mon 20 Mar	Southern Steel	38–55	Mainland Tactix	Stadium Southland
7:00PM	Saviour Tui 14/17 (82%); Eseta Autagavaia 13/15 (87%); Georgia Heffernan 11/16 (69%)	Report; Stats	Aliyah Dunn 39/45 (87%); Te Paea Selby-Rickit 15/18 (83%); Vika Koloto 1/1 (100%)

=== Round 4 ===
Sat 25 Mar	Southern Steel	49–54	Waikato Bay of Plenty Magic	Stadium Southland
7:00PM	Saviour Tui 28/31 (90%); Eseta Autagavaia 11/13 (85%); Georgia Heffernan 10/16 (63%)	Report; Stats	Bailey Mes 30/32 (94%); Ameliaranne Ekenasio 24/26 (92%)

Sun 26 Mar	Mainland Tactix	50–49	Central Pulse	MainPower Stadium
2:00PM	Aliyah Dunn 33/37 (89%); Te Paea Selby-Rickit 17/20 (85%)	Report; Stats	Amelia Walmsley 40/45 (89%); Tiana Metuarau 9/12 (75%)

Sun 26 Mar	Northern Mystics	62–59	Northern Stars	The Trusts Arena
4:00PM	Grace Nweke 46/46 (100%); Monica Falkner 15/17 (88%); Filda Vui 1/1 (100%)	Report; Stats	Maia Wilson 32/34 (94%); Amorangi Malesala 19/24 (79%); Jamie Hume 8/14 (57%)

Mon 27 Mar	Mainland Tactix	58–41	Waikato Bay of Plenty Magic	MainPower Stadium
7:00PM	Aliyah Dunn 43/43 (100%); Te Paea Selby-Rickit 14/17 (82%); Vika Koloto 1/3 (33%)	Report; Stats	Bailey Mes 25/27 (93%); Ameliaranne Ekenasio 16/20 (80%)

=== Round 5 ===
Sat 1 Apr	Southern Steel	48–64	Northern Mystics	Edgar Centre
7:00PM	Saviour Tui 22/31 (71%); Eseta Autagavaia 6/7 (86%); Georgia Heffernan 20/29 (69%)	Report; Stats	Grace Nweke 47/48 (98%); Monica Falkner 17/19 (89%); Filda Vui 0/1 (0%)

Sun 2 Apr	Central Pulse	47–48	Waikato Bay of Plenty Magic	Te Rauparaha Arena
2:00PM	Amelia Walmsley 31/38 (82%); Tiana Metuarau 13/15 (87%); Joyce Mvula 3/5 (60%)	Report; Stats	Bailey Mes 30/32 (94%); Ameliaranne Ekenasio 18/20 (90%)

Sun 2 Apr	Northern Stars	57–48	Mainland Tactix	Pulman Arena
4:00PM	Maia Wilson 36/38 (95%); Amorangi Malesala 21/25 (84%)	Report; Stats	Aliyah Dunn 32/34 (94%); Te Paea Selby-Rickit 16/19 (84%)

Mon 3 Apr	Central Pulse	51–56	Northern Mystics	Te Rauparaha Arena
7:00PM	Amelia Walmsley 27/34 (79%); Tiana Metuarau 17/18 (94%); Joyce Mvula 7/7 (100%)	Report; Stats	Grace Nweke 45/48 (94%); Monica Falkner 11/12 (92%)

=== Round 6 ===
Sat 8 Apr	Northern Stars	44–58	Central Pulse	Pulman Arena
7:00PM	Maia Wilson 33/35 (94%); Amorangi Malesala 8/10 (80%); Jamie Hume 3/3 (100%)	Report; Stats	Amelia Walmsley 44/52 (85%); Tiana Metuarau 13/13 (100%); Joyce Mvula 1/1 (100%)

Sun 9 Apr	Waikato Bay of Plenty Magic	61–62	Northern Mystics	Energy Events Centre
2:00PM	Bailey Mes 36/41 (88%); Ameliaranne Ekenasio 25/27 (93%)	Report; Stats	Grace Nweke 50/55 (91%); Monica Falkner 7/8 (88%); Filda Vui 5/6 (83%)

Sun 9 Apr	Mainland Tactix	58–45	Southern Steel	Christchurch Arena
4:00PM	Aliyah Dunn 40/40 (100%); Te Paea Selby-Rickit 18/23 (78%)	Report; Stats	Eseta Autagavaia 10/13 (77%); Georgia Heffernan 24/28 (86%); Jess Allan 11/13 (85%)

Mon 10 Apr	Waikato Bay of Plenty Magic	71–57	Northern Stars	Globox Arena
7:00PM	Bailey Mes 54/58 (93%); Ameliaranne Ekenasio 17/18 (94%)	Report; Stats	Maia Wilson 37/39 (95%); Amorangi Malesala 9/12 (75%); Jamie Hume 11/11 (100%)

=== Round 7 ===
Sat 15 Apr	Northern Mystics	53–55	Central Pulse	The Trusts Arena
4:00PM	Grace Nweke 41/45 (91%); Monica Falkner 11/12 (92%); Filda Vui 1/1 (100%)	Report; Stats	Amelia Walmsley 36/50 (72%); Tiana Metuarau 17/19 (89%); Joyce Mvula 2/4 (50%)

Sat 15 Apr	Northern Stars	49–47	Southern Steel	Pulman Arena
7:00PM	Maia Wilson 32/37 (86%); Amorangi Malesala 13/15 (87%); Jamie Hume 4/8 (50%)	Report; Stats	Saviour Tui 28/31 (90%); Georgia Heffernan 14/17 (82%); Eseta Autagavaia 5/9 (56%)

Sun 16 Apr	Waikato Bay of Plenty Magic	46–49	Mainland Tactix	Trustpower Arena
4:00PM	Bailey Mes 25/27 (93%); Ameliaranne Ekenasio 21/23 (91%)	Report; Stats	Aliyah Dunn 28/31 (90%); Te Paea Selby-Rickit 21/23 (91%)

Mon 17 Apr	Central Pulse	62–38	Southern Steel	TSB Bank Arena
7:00PM	Amelia Walmsley 52/58 (90%); Tiana Metuarau 10/13 (77%)	Report; Stats	Saviour Tui 11/13 (85%); Georgia Heffernan 18/23 (78%); Jess Allan 9/10 (90%)

=== Round 8 ===
Sat 22 Apr	Central Pulse	64–62	Northern Stars	TSB Bank Arena
7:00PM	Amelia Walmsley 53/61 (87%); Tiana Metuarau 11/11 (100%)	Report; Stats	Maia Wilson 42/43 (98%); Amorangi Malesala 20

Sun 23 Apr	Southern Steel	31–50	Mainland Tactix	Edgar Centre
2:00PM	Saviour Tui 16/17 (94%); Georgia Heffernan 13/18 (72%); Jess Allan 2/3 (67%)	Report; Stats	Aliyah Dunn 31/32 (97%); Te Paea Selby-Rickit 19/22 (86%)

Sun 23 Apr	Northern Mystics	60–49	Waikato Bay of Plenty Magic	The Trusts Arena
4:00PM	Grace Nweke 50/62 (81%); Filda Vui 10/15 (67%)	Report; Stats	Bailey Mes 24/29 (83%); Ameliaranne Ekenasio 25/29 (86%)

Mon 24 Apr	Northern Mystics	77–79	Northern Stars	The Trusts Arena
7:00PM	Grace Nweke 70/75 (93%); Filda Vui 7/11 (64%)	Report; Stats	Maia Wilson 50/54 (93%); Amorangi Malesala 27/32 (84%); Jamie Hume 2/3 (67%)

=== Round 9 ===
Sat 29 Apr	Southern Steel	43–44	Central Pulse	Stadium Southland
7:00PM	Saviour Tui 31/38 (82%); Georgia Heffernan 12/14 (86%)	Report; Stats	Amelia Walmsley 25/26 (96%); Tiana Metuarau 13/16 (81%); Joyce Mvula 6/7 (86%)

Sun 30 Apr	Mainland Tactix	77–79	Northern Mystics	Christchurch Arena
2:00PM	Aliyah Dunn; Te Paea Selby-Rickit; Vika Koloto	Report	Grace Nweke 64/66 (97%); Monica Falkner; Filda Vui

Sun 30 Apr	Northern Stars	61–55	Waikato Bay of Plenty Magic	Pulman Arena
4:00PM	Maia Wilson 47/49 (96%); Amorangi Malesala 14/20 (70%); Jamie Hume 0/1 (0%)	Report; Stats	Bailey Mes 30/36 (83%); Ameliaranne Ekenasio 25/27 (93%)

Mon 1 May	Mainland Tactix	45–54	Central Pulse	Christchurch Arena
7:00PM	Aliyah Dunn 18/20 (90%); Te Paea Selby-Rickit 27/27 (100%); Vika Koloto 0/1 (0%)	Report; Stats	Amelia Walmsley 45/54 (83%); Tiana Metuarau 9/11 (82%)

=== Round 10 ===
Sat 6 May	Northern Mystics	65–55	Southern Steel	The Trusts Arena
7:00PM	Grace Nweke 53/58 (91%); Filda Vui 12/16 (75%)	Report; Stats	Saviour Tui 41/51 (80%); Georgia Heffernan 12/17 (71%); Jess Allan 2/3 (67%)

Sun 7 May	Waikato Bay of Plenty Magic	49–50	Central Pulse	Globox Arena
2:00PM	Bailey Mes 25/30 (83%); Ameliaranne Ekenasio 24/25 (96%)	Report; Stats	Amelia Walmsley 37/39 (95%); Tiana Metuarau 13/15 (87%)

Sun 7 May	Mainland Tactix	50–57	Northern Stars	Christchurch Arena
4:00PM	Aliyah Dunn 32/36 (89%); Te Paea Selby-Rickit 18/22 (82%)	Report; Stats	Maia Wilson 34/37 (92%); Amorangi Malesala 23/28 (82%)

Mon 8 May	Waikato Bay of Plenty Magic	52–45	Southern Steel	Globox Arena
7:00 PM	Bailey Mes 26/28 (93%); Ameliaranne Ekenasio 26/28 (93%)	Report; Stats	Saviour Tui 34/37 (92%); Georgia Heffernan 9/13 (69%); Jess Allan 2/2 (100%)

=== Round 11 ===
Sat 13 May	Mainland Tactix	65–56	Waikato Bay of Plenty Magic	MainPower Stadium
7:00PM	Aliyah Dunn 39/40 (98%); Te Paea Selby-Rickit 26/27 (96%)	Report; Stats	Bailey Mes 34/36 (94%); Ameliaranne Ekenasio 22/22 (100%)

Sun 14 May	Central Pulse	62–56	Northern Mystics	TSB Bank Arena
4:00PM	Amelia Walmsley 47/57 (82%); Tiana Metuarau 15/15 (100%)	Report; Stats	Grace Nweke 46/51 (90%); Filda Vui 10/15 (67%)

Mon 15 May	Southern Steel	47–58	Northern Stars	Stadium Southland
7:00 PM	Saviour Tui 35/41 (85%); Georgia Heffernan 12/16 (75%)	Report; Stats	Maia Wilson 42/43 (98%); Amorangi Malesala 13/20 (65%); Jamie Hume 3/5 (60%)

=== Round 12 ===
Sat 20 May	Central Pulse	45–54	Mainland Tactix	TSB Bank Arena
7:00PM	Amelia Walmsley 40/47 (85%); Tiana Metuarau 5/5 (100%)	Report; Stats	Aliyah Dunn 37/40 (93%); Te Paea Selby-Rickit 17/23 (74%)

Sun 21 May	Northern Stars	63–58	Northern Mystics	Pulman Arena
2:00PM	Maia Wilson 33/36 (92%); Amorangi Malesala 25/29 (86%)	Report; Stats	Grace Nweke 52/56 (93%); Filda Vui 11/13 (85%)

Sun 21 May	Southern Steel	52–53	Waikato Bay of Plenty Magic	Stadium Southland
4:00PM	Saviour Tui 41/46 (89%); Georgia Heffernan 11/15 (73%)	Report; Stats	Bailey Mes 23/27 (85%); Ameliaranne Ekenasio 30/32 (94%)

Mon 22 May	Northern Mystics	64–61	Mainland Tactix	Eventfinda Stadium
7:00PM	Grace Nweke 59/69 (86%); Filda Vui 5/9 (56%)	Report; Stats	Aliyah Dunn 32/33 (97%); Te Paea Selby-Rickit 29/33 (88%)

== Final standings ==
2023 ANZ Premiership ladder
Pos	Team	P	W	L	GF	GA	GD	G%	BP	Pts
1	Northern Mystics	15	11	4	930	828	102	112.3%	3	36
2	Central Pulse	15	10	5	802	746	56	107.5%	3	33
3	Northern Stars	15	9	6	889	835	54	106.5%	3	30
4	Mainland Tactix	15	9	6	793	760	33	104.3%	1	28
5	Waikato Bay of Plenty Magic	15	6	9	791	830	-39	95.3%	4	22
6	Southern Steel	15	0	15	653	859	-206	76.0%	4	4
Last updated: 7 August 2023

Qualified for Grand final
Qualified for Elimination final

== Finals series ==
=== Elimination final ===
28 May 2023	Central Pulse	52–53	Northern Stars	Te Rauparaha Arena	Sky Sport
28 May 2023	Scoring by quarter: 14–12, 29–25, 37–41, 52–53			Te Rauparaha Arena	Sky Sport
28 May 2023	Amelia Walmsley 41/45 (91%); Tiana Metuarau 11/13 (85%)		Maia Wilson 36/38 (95%); Amorangi Malesala 17/21 (81%)	Te Rauparaha Arena	Sky Sport

=== Grand final ===
4 June 2023	Northern Mystics	74–56	Northern Stars	Globox Arena	Sky Sport
4 June 2023	Scoring by quarter: 21–17, 38–29, 54–45, 74–56			Globox Arena	Sky Sport
4 June 2023	Grace Nweke 70/73 (96%); Filda Vui 3/5 (60%); Danielle Binks 1/1 (100%)		Maia Wilson 38/42 (90%); Amorangi Malesala 17/21 (81%); Jamie Hume 1/3 (33%)	Globox Arena	Sky Sport

== Awards ==
=== New Zealand Netball Awards ===
Award	Winner	Team
Dame Lois Muir Supreme Award	Kelly Jackson	Central Pulse
ANZ Premiership Coach of the Year	Tia Winikerei	Northern Mystics
ANZ Premiership Player of the Year	Maddy Gordon	Central Pulse
Te Rau Mataaho – ANZ Premiership Players’ Award	Peta Toeava	Northern Mystics
ANZ Premiership Umpire of the Year	Gareth Fowler	

=== ANZ Premiership Awards ===
Award	Winner	Team
Grand Final MVP	Grace Nweke	Northern Mystics

=== Team of the season ===
Brendon Egan selected Stuff's team of the season.

All Star Seven

Position	Player	Team
GS	Grace Nweke	Northern Mystics
GA	Ameliaranne Ekenasio	Waikato Bay of Plenty Magic
WA	Gina Crampton	Northern Stars
C	Maddy Gordon	Central Pulse
WD	Michaela Sokolich-Beatson	Northern Mystics
GD	Karin Burger	Mainland Tactix
GK	Kelly Jury	Central Pulse

Bench

Positions	Player	Team
GS	Maia Wilson	Northern Stars
WA, C	Whitney Souness	Central Pulse
WD, C, WA	Kate Heffernan	Southern Steel
GK, GD	Phoenix Karaka	Northern Mystics
GK, GD	Elle Temu	Northern Stars

== Season statistics ==
Goal Shooters (by Goals Scored)
Pos.	Player	Team	Goals (%)
1	Grace Nweke	Northern Mystics	825/894 (92%)
2	Maia Wilson	Northern Stars	669/713 (94%)
3	Amelia Walmsley	Central Pulse	627/727 (86%)
4	Aliyah Dunn	Mainland Tactix	502/542 (93%)
5	Bailey Mes	Waikato Bay of Plenty Magic	442/504 (88%)
6	Ameliaranne Ekenasio	Waikato Bay of Plenty Magic	349/385 (91%)
7	Saviour Tui	Southern Steel	302/354 (85%)
8	Te Paea Selby-Rickit	Mainland Tactix	286/337 (85%)
9	Amorangi Malesala	Northern Stars	256/320 (80%)
10	Georgia Heffernan	Southern Steel	214/285 (75%)

Centre Pass Receives
Pos.	Player	Team	CPR
1	Whitney Souness	Central Pulse	471
2	Gina Crampton	Northern Stars	364
3	Simmon Wilbore	Waikato Bay of Plenty Magic	317
4	Peta Toeava	Northern Mystics	297
5	Te Paea Selby-Rickit	Mainland Tactix	290
6	Amorangi Malesala	Northern Stars	247
7	Filda Vui	Northern Mystics	232
8	Kimiora Poi	Mainland Tactix	232
9	Ameliaranne Ekenasio	Waikato Bay of Plenty Magic	215
10	Samantha Winders	Southern Steel	201

Circle Feeds
Pos.	Player	Team	CF
1	Gina Crampton	Northern Stars	736
2	Mila Reuelu-Buchanan	Northern Stars	708
3	Peta Toeava	Northern Mystics	600
4	Whitney Souness	Central Pulse	480
5	Kimiora Poi	Mainland Tactix	468
6	Maddy Gordon	Central Pulse	438
7	Simmon Wilbore	Waikato Bay of Plenty Magic	425
8	Laura Malcolm	Mainland Tactix	366
9	Kate Heffernan	Southern Steel	366
10	Tayla Earle	Northern Mystics	305

Defensive Rebounds
Pos.	Player	Team	DRs.
1	Kelly Jury	Central Pulse	24
2	Phoenix Karaka	Northern Mystics	23
3	Kate Burley	Southern Steel	21
4	Erena Mikaere	Waikato Bay of Plenty Magic	21
5	Elle Temu	Northern Stars	15
6	Georgia Takarangi	Waikato Bay of Plenty Magic	13
7	Carys Stythe	Northern Mystics	13
8	Sulu Fitzpatrick	Northern Mystics	12
9	Jane Watson	Mainland Tactix	9
10	Kelera Nawai-Caucau	Northern Stars	8

Deflections
Pos.	Player	Team	Def
1	Kelly Jury	Central Pulse	77
2	Kate Burley	Southern Steel	67
3	Phoenix Karaka	Northern Mystics	65
4	Karin Burger	Mainland Tactix	59
5	Georgia Takarangi	Waikato Bay of Plenty Magic	55
6	Jane Watson	Mainland Tactix	54
7	Holly Fowler	Northern Stars	49
8	Elle Temu	Northern Stars	49
9	Maddy Gordon	Central Pulse	47
10	Erena Mikaere	Waikato Bay of Plenty Magic	46

Intercepts
Pos.	Player	Team	Inter.
1	Karin Burger	Mainland Tactix	39
2	Kelly Jury	Central Pulse	34
3	Elle Temu	Northern Stars	27
4	Phoenix Karaka	Northern Mystics	26
5	Kate Heffernan	Southern Steel	26
6	Jane Watson	Mainland Tactix	26
7	Kate Burley	Southern Steel	22
8	Kelera Nawai-Caucau	Northern Stars	18
9	Erena Mikaere	Waikato Bay of Plenty Magic	17
10	Maddy Gordon	Central Pulse	15

Total Penalties
Pos.	Player	Team	TPs
1	Kelly Jury	Central Pulse	204
2	Georgia Takarangi	Waikato Bay of Plenty Magic	187
3	Karin Burger	Mainland Tactix	181
4	Kelera Nawai-Caucau	Northern Stars	173
5	Phoenix Karaka	Northern Mystics	170
6	Elle Temu	Northern Stars	163
7	Kristiana Manu'a	Central Pulse	160
8	Fa'amu Ioane	Central Pulse	142
9	Mila Reuelu-Buchanan	Northern Stars	140
10	Kate Burley	Southern Steel	135
