= 2024 ANZ Premiership season =

Netball league season

- League: ANZ Premiership
- Sport: Netball
- Duration: 13 April – 4 August 2024
- Teams: 6
- TV partner(s): Sky Sport (New Zealand); TVNZ
- Minor premiers: Central Pulse
- Season MVP: Ameliaranne Ekenasio

Finals
- Champions: Northern Mystics
- Runners-up: Central Pulse

ANZ Premiership seasons
- ← 2023 2025 →

The 2024 ANZ Premiership season was the eighth season of Netball New Zealand's ANZ Premiership. With a team coached by Tia Winikerei, captained by Michaela Sokolich-Beatson and featuring Phoenix Karaka, Grace Nweke, and Peta Toeava, Northern Mystics won their third title. Central Pulse finished the regular season as minor premiers, finishing above Mainland Tactix and Northern Mystics. In the Elimination final, Mystics defeated Tactix 68–64. Mystics then defeated Pulse 54–53 in the Grand final.

== Head coaches and captains ==
Team	Head coach	Captain
Central Pulse	Anna Andrews-Tasola	Kelly Jury
Mainland Tactix	Marianne Delaney-Hoshek	Kimiora Poi
Northern Mystics	Tia Winikerei	Michaela Sokolich-Beatson
Northern Stars	Kiri Wills	Maia Wilson
Southern Steel	Reinga Bloxham	Kate Heffernan
Waikato Bay of Plenty Magic	Mary-Jane Araroa	Ameliaranne Ekenasio

== Regular season ==
=== Round 1 ===
Waikato Bay of Plenty Magic	52-64	Northern Mystics	Globox Arena

Northern Stars	51-58	Central Pulse	Pulman Arena

Mainland Tactix	52-35	Southern Steel	Wolfbrook Arena

=== Round 2 ===
Central Pulse	56-44	Waikato Bay of Plenty Magic	TSB Arena

Mainland Tactix	59-54	Northern Stars	Wolfbrook Arena

Southern Steel	52-61	Northern Mystics	ILT Stadium Southland

=== Round 3 ===
Northern Stars	49-52	Waikato Bay of Plenty Magic	Pulman Arena

Central Pulse	54-46	Southern Steel	TSB Arena

Northern Mystics	59-62	Mainland Tactix	The Trusts Arena

=== Round 4 ===
Southern Steel	63-61	Northern Stars	ILT Stadium Southland

Northern Mystics	47-52	Central Pulse	The Trusts Arena

Waikato Bay of Plenty Magic	53-54	Mainland Tactix	Globox Arena

=== Round 5 ===
Waikato Bay of Plenty Magic	54-45	Southern Steel	Energy Events Centre

Central Pulse	36-30	Mainland Tactix	Fly Palmy Arena

Northern Stars	51-56	Northern Mystics	Pulman Arena

=== Round 6 ===
Central Pulse	58-52	Northern Stars	TSB Arena

Mainland Tactix	53-44	Southern Steel	Mainpower Stadium

Northern Mystics	54-44	Waikato Bay of Plenty Magic	The Trusts Arena

=== Round 7 ===
Waikato Bay of Plenty Magic	58-41	Central Pulse	Mercury Baypark Arena

Southern Steel	47-43	Northern Mystics	Edgar Centre

Mainland Tactix	58-57	Northern Stars	Wolfbrook Arena

=== Round 8 ===
Southern Steel	37-57	Central Pulse	ILT Stadium Southland

Northern Mystics	42-56	Mainland Tactix	The Trusts Arena

Northern Stars	56-60	Waikato Bay of Plenty Magic	Auckland Netball Centre

=== Round 9 ===
Northern Stars	63-46	Southern Steel	Pulman Arena

Waikato Bay of Plenty Magic	42-60	Mainland Tactix	Globox Arena

Central Pulse	54-38	Northern Mystics	Te Rauparaha Arena

=== Round 10 ===
Northern Mystics	51-49	Northern Stars	The Trusts Arena

Mainland Tactix	58-53	Central Pulse	Wolfbrook Arena

Waikato Bay of Plenty Magic	48-41	Southern Steel	Globox Arena

=== Round 11 ===
Southern Steel	47-71	Mainland Tactix	ILT Stadium Southland

Central Pulse	46-43	Northern Stars	Te Rauparaha Arena

Northern Mystics	42-54	Waikato Bay of Plenty Magic	The Trusts Arena

=== Round 12 ===
Waikato Bay of Plenty Magic	51-47	Northern Stars	Mercury Baypark Arena

Mainland Tactix	49-61	Northern Mystics	Wolfbrook Arena

Southern Steel	38-65	Central Pulse	ILT Stadium Southland

=== Round 13 ===
Northern Stars	54-65	Mainland Tactix	Pulman Arena, Auckland

Northern Mystics	68-47	Southern Steel	Eventfinda Stadium

Waikato Bay of Plenty Magic	48-53	Central Pulse	Globox Arena

=== Round 14 ===
Northern Mystics	68-58	Central Pulse	Eventfinda Stadium

Mainland Tactix	49-51	Waikato Bay of Plenty Magic	Mainpower Stadium

Southern Steel	53-54	Northern Stars	Edgar Centre

=== Round 15 ===
Southern Steel	44-55	Waikato Bay of Plenty Magic	ILT Stadium Southland

Northern Stars	55-63	Northern Mystics	Pulman Arena

Central Pulse	58-44	Mainland Tactix	TSB Arena

== Final standings ==
2024 ANZ Premiership ladder
Pos	Team	P	W	L	GF	GA	GD	G%	BP	Pts
1	Central Pulse	15	12	3	799	702	97	113.8%	1	37
2	Mainland Tactix	15	11	4	820	746	74	109.9%	1	34
3	Northern Mystics	15	9	6	817	782	35	104.5%	3	30
4	Waikato Bay of Plenty Magic	15	9	6	766	755	11	101.5%	2	29
5	Northern Stars	15	2	13	796	839	-43	94.9%	9	15
6	Southern Steel	15	2	13	685	859	-174	79.7%	1	7
Last updated: 15 July 2025

Qualified for Grand final
Qualified for Elimination final

== Finals series ==
=== Elimination final ===
27 July 2024	Mainland Tactix	64–68	Northern Mystics	Wolfbrook Arena	Sky Sport
27 July 2024	Scoring by quarter: 17–17, 33–35, 49–46, 64–68			Wolfbrook Arena	Sky Sport
27 July 2024	Ellie Bird 55/56 (98%); Te Paea Selby-Rickit 5/7 (71%); Jess Allan 4/5 (80%)		Grace Nweke 60/70 (86%); Filda Vui 7/7 (100%); Dani Binks 1/1 (100%))	Wolfbrook Arena	Sky Sport

=== Grand final ===
4 August 2024	Central Pulse	53–54	Northern Mystics	TSB Arena	Sky Sport
4 August 2024	Scoring by quarter: 9–14, 25–27, 41–42, 53–54			TSB Arena	Sky Sport
4 August 2024	Amelia Walmsley 39/46 (85%); Tiana Metuarau 11/12 (92%); Martina Salmon 3/3 (100%)		Grace Nweke 48/55 (87%); Filda Vui 4/4 (100%); Dani Binks 2/4 (50%)	TSB Arena	Sky Sport

== Awards ==
=== New Zealand Netball Awards ===
Award	Winner	Team
Dame Lois Muir Supreme Award	Kelly Jackson	Central Pulse
ANZ Premiership Coach of the Year	Tia Winikerei	Northern Mystics
ANZ Premiership Player of the Year	Ameliaranne Ekenasio	Waikato Bay of Plenty Magic
Te Rau Mataaho – ANZ Premiership Players’ Award	Georgia Tong	Waikato Bay of Plenty Magic
ANZ Premiership Umpire of the Year	Gareth Fowler	
