= 2025 ANZ Premiership season =

Netball league season

- League: ANZ Premiership
- Sport: Netball
- Duration: 10 May – 27 July 2025
- Number of teams: 6
- TV partner(s): Sky Sport (New Zealand); TVNZ
- Minor premiers: Northern Mystics

Finals
- Champions: Mainland Tactix
- Runners-up: Northern Mystics

ANZ Premiership seasons
- ← 2024 2026 →

The 2025 ANZ Premiership season was the ninth season of Netball New Zealand's ANZ Premiership. Northern Mystics won the minor premiership by finishing top of the table at the conclusion of the regular season. The season was notable for introducing a number of rule changes: the two-point shot, the coach's box and time-outs. The competition format also changed, with teams facing each other twice instead of three times during the regular season. In the Elimination final, the Tactix defeated the Pulse 57–52. The Tactix then went on to defeat the defending champs the Northern Mystics 58–46 in the Grand Final.

== Head coaches and captains ==
Team	Head coach	Captain(s)
Central Pulse	Anna Andrews-Tasola	Kelly Jackson
Mainland Tactix	Donna Wilkins	Erikana Pedersen
Northern Mystics	Tia Winikerei	Michaela Sokolich-Beatson
Northern Stars	Temepara Bailey	Maia Wilson
Southern Steel	Wendy Frew	Kate Heffernan; Kimiora Poi
Waikato Bay of Plenty Magic	Mary-Jane Araroa	Ameliaranne Ekenasio

== Final standings ==
2025 ANZ Premiership ladder
Pos	Team	P	W	L	GF	GA	GD	G%	BP	Pts
1	Northern Mystics	10	9	1	595	513	82	116.0%	0	27
2	Mainland Tactix	10	7	3	571	539	32	105.9%	1	22
3	Central Pulse	10	6	4	582	524	58	111.1%	1	19
4	Southern Steel	10	5	5	565	550	15	102.7%	2	17
5	Waikato Bay of Plenty Magic	10	2	8	528	571	-43	92.5%	3	9
6	Northern Stars	10	1	9	507	651	-144	77.9%	0	3
Last updated: 15 July 2025

Qualified for Grand final
Qualified for Elimination final

== Finals series ==
=== Elimination final ===
20 July 2025	Report; Stats	Mainland Tactix	57–52	Central Pulse	Wolfbrook Arena	Sky Sport
20 July 2025	Report; Stats	Scoring by quarter: 10–14, 26–30, 41–40, 57–52			Wolfbrook Arena	Sky Sport
20 July 2025	Report; Stats	2 Goal Shots; Te Paea Selby-Rickit 1/1 (100%); 1 Goal Shots; Ellie Bird 47/55 (85%); Te Paea Selby-Rickit 8/13 (62%)		2 Goal Shots; Amorangi Malesala 3/4 (75%); Amelia Walmsley 1/1 (100%); 1 Goal Shots; Amelia Walmsley 40/41 (98%); Tiana Metuarau 3/3 (100%); Amorangi Malesala 1/1 (100%)	Wolfbrook Arena	Sky Sport

=== Grand final ===
27 July 2025	Report; Stats	Northern Mystics	46–58	Mainland Tactix	The Trusts Arena	Sky Sport
27 July 2025	Report; Stats	Scoring by quarter: 8-17, 22-31, 36-47, 46-58			The Trusts Arena	Sky Sport
27 July 2025	Report; Stats	2 Goal Shots; Donnell Wallam 0/2 (0%); Filda Vui 2/7 (29%); 1 Goal Shots; Donnell Wallam 38/43 (88%); Filda Vui 3/3 (100%); Elisapeta Toeava 1/1 (100%)		2 Goal Shots; Te Paea Selby-Rickit 0/2 (0%); 1 Goal Shots; Ellie Bird 50/54 (93%); Te Paea Selby-Rickit 8/9 (89%)	The Trusts Arena	Sky Sport
