= Kayla Johnson (netball) =

New Zealand netball player

Personal information
- Full name: Kayla Malvina Johnson (Née: Cullen)
- Born: 13 February 1992 (age 34) Auckland, New Zealand
- Height: 1.83 m (6 ft 0 in)
- Spouse: Shaun Johnson (m. 2019)
- School: Auckland Girls' Grammar School

Netball career
- Playing positions: GD, WD, C,
Years	Club team	Apps
2010–16	Northern Mystics	64
2017–present	Northern Stars	5
2019	New South Wales Swifts	1
- (Correct as of 30 July 2019)
Years	National team	Caps
2008–09	NZ Secondary Schools	
2008–13	NZ U21	
2010–present	Fastnet Ferns	10
2011–present	Silver Ferns	30
- (Correct as of 24 May 2016)
Medal record
Representing New Zealand
World Netball Series
Gold medal – first place	2010 Liverpool	Fastnet
Silver medal – second place	2011 Liverpool	Fastnet
Gold medal – first place	2012 Auckland	Fast5
Netball World Cup
Silver medal – second place	2015 Sydney	NZ
Netball at the Commonwealth Games
Bronze medal – third place	2022 Birmingham	Team

Kayla Malvina Johnson (née Cullen, born 13 February 1992) is a former Zealand netball player. As a high school student, Cullen played representative netball and basketball, and competed at a national level in athletics. In 2008, she was selected in the New Zealand U21 netball team, and was a member of the side that finished second at the 2009 World Youth Netball Championships, behind Australia.

At the end of 2009, Cullen was signed to play with the Northern Mystics in the ANZ Championship, starting from 2010. Cullen played five matches in her debut season, and was nominated for the competition's Best Young Player award. She was selected for the Fastnet Ferns to represent New Zealand at the 2010 World Netball Series in England, where the team finished first.

Cullen spent much of her early career playing in almost every position on court, before settling as a defender. In 2011 the Mystics, under new head coach Debbie Fuller, qualified for their first finals series. Cullen played in every Mystics game, and earned a place in the starting lineup for the Mystic's first grand final, which they lost to the Queensland Firebirds. Nevertheless, Cullen's performance during the 2011 season earned her a place in the ANZ Championship All-Star team at wing defence. She also won the award for the ANZ Championship's Best Young Player that year.

== Personal life ==
She is married to former rugby league player, Shaun Johnson. She gave birth to a daughter called Millah in 2020. Johnson announced her second pregnancy in January 2023 making her not available for the 2023 ANZ Premiership season and Netball World Cup.

== Early years and career ==
Kayla Malvina Cullen was born on 13 February 1992 in Auckland, New Zealand, into a large, family. She attended Auckland Girls' Grammar School, during which time she competed at national level in athletics, and represented New Zealand in basketball and netball. In 2008, Cullen was selected as a 16-year-old for the New Zealand Secondary Schools (NZSS) netball team and the Junior Tall Ferns basketball team. With her family struggling to raise funds for Cullen to represent New Zealand in two sports, she was donated money to participate in the NZSS netball team's tour of Australia that year. Cullen played as a shooter for most of her early career.

== 2009: Early U21 career ==
Cullen represented Auckland-Waitakere at national U21 level. She was also selected in the New Zealand U21 squad for their 2008 tour of Australia. She suffered a ruptured anterior cruciate ligament during that tour and underwent rehabilitation surgery. In March the following year, Cullen was reselected for the NZSS netball team. NZSS defeated Australia in the final of a regional secondary schools tournament held in Auckland in June that year. Cullen was named attacking player of the tournament, and overall player of the tournament.

Cullen's recovery and NZSS performance led to her being recalled into the New Zealand U21 side for the 2009 World Youth Netball Championships in the Cook Islands, subject to medical clearance following her ACL injury in 2008. Cullen joined the NZ U21 side in the Cook Islands, where they finished second at the World Youth Championships, behind Australia.

Her 2009 season was capped off when the 17-year-old Cullen was selected to play for the Northern Mystics in their 2010 ANZ Championship campaign. Joining her in the Auckland franchise was fellow NZSS netball team member Sulu Tone-Fitzpatrick. Cullen's successful year in netball earned her a nomination for the (high school) ASB Auckland Sportswoman of the Year award.

== 2010: Mystics debut and Fastnet Ferns ==
In 2010, Cullen made her ANZ Championship debut with the Mystics. Normally a shooter, Cullen and fellow NZ U21 player Sulu Tone-Fitzpatrick were called into the Mystics defensive circle during the 2010 preseason to cover injuries to starting players. She played five matches for the Mystics in her debut season: despite being listed in the team roster as an attacking player, she played mostly in the Mystics defensive line. She was nominated as the Best Young Player in the ANZ Championship for 2010, although the award eventually went to Sharni Layton.

Cullen retained her spot in the New Zealand U21 team, and was also selected in the Fastnet Ferns to represent New Zealand at the 2010 World Netball Series in Liverpool, England. The 2010 Fastnet Ferns mostly comprised members of the wider Silver Ferns squad, and were much less experienced that the side that won the inaugural competition in 2009. Coach Robyn Broughton opted to use more experienced players for most games, although Cullen was trialled in different court positions, even playing at centre. After struggling through the round-robin matches, the young New Zealand side went on to win the 2010 title, defeating hosts England 28–26 in the final.

== 2011: All Star and Best Young Player ==
Despite being played in almost every position during her early career, by 2011 Cullen had become more accustomed to playing as a defender. The Northern Mystics featured a strengthened lineup for their 2011 campaign, adding former Australian representative player Megan Dehn in their attack end, and former Silver Fern Anna Scarlett in the defence circle. The Mystics started their 2011 season well, including an early upset win over 2009 premiers the Melbourne Vixens. Cullen's mobility and athleticism featured in a makeshift defence lineup following injuries to key defenders.

Cullen played in all of the Mystics' ANZ Championship games in 2011. The Mystics finished the round-robin season in fourth place, scraping into the finals series. Standout performances against the New South Wales Swifts and Waikato Bay of Plenty Magic earned the Auckland franchise their first ANZ Championship grand final appearance. Despite her young age, Cullen was picked in the Mystics starting lineup at GD for the grand final against the unbeaten Queensland Firebirds, matching up against experienced Australian GA Natalie Medhurst. After a closely fought first half in the grand final, the Firebirds gathered momentum to secure a comfortable 57–44 victory. Cullen was rested in the third quarter of the match, during which the Mystics defenders struggled to keep up with the Firebirds' attacking pace.

After a stellar 2011 season with the Mystics, Cullen was named as the competition's Best Young Player. She was also selected for the inaugural ANZ Championship All-Star Team, slotting in at wing defence; fellow Mystics defender Anna Scarlett was named at goal defence. Following her stellar ANZ Championship season, Cullen joined the New Zealand U21 team in a three-match series against Australia U21, which New Zealand lost 2–1.

== The Silver Ferns ==
With injuries to two of the incumbent defenders in the national team, Cullen was named in the ferns for the end of 2011 series against England and Australia. She debuted in the first match against England, and was used in all 5 matches of the year. She was retained in 2012 and has been shifted to the midcourt to cover the retirement of Temepara George and the pregnancy of Joline Henry. Due to the loss of George and Jade Clarke it is expected she will be used in the C position for the Mystics' 2013 campaign.

She was named in the Fast5 Ferns for the 2012 Fast5 Netball World Series, where she won a gold medal, used only in the C position. She was also in the 2011 team, where she won a silver medal.

In 2015 she was named in the Silver Ferns squad for the Netball World Cup in Sydney, Australia. Cullen played most of the tournament at WD and was in the starting 7 of the Grand Final where New Zealand took home the silver medal behind Australia.
