= Kimiora Poi =

New Zealand netball international

Personal information
- Born: 1 November 1997 (age 29) Gisborne, New Zealand
- Height: 1.68 m (5 ft 6 in)
- Relative: Morgan Poi (brother)
- School: Napier Girls' High School
- University: Victoria University; University of Canterbury

Netball career
- Playing positions: C, WA
Years	Club team	Apps
2016–2017	Central Zone	
2017	→ Central Pulse	1
2018–2024	Mainland Tactix	
2019	→ Collingwood Magpies	7
2025–	Southern Steel	
Years	National team	Caps
2019–	New Zealand	10
Medal record
Women's netball
Representing New Zealand
Commonwealth Games
Gold medal – first place	2026 Glasgow	Team
Netball World Youth Cup
Gold medal – first place	2017 Gaborone	Team
Fast5 World Series
Gold medal – first place	2018 Melbourne	Team
Bronze medal – third place	2022 Christchurch	Team

Kimiora Poi (born 1 November 1997) is a New Zealand netball international who plays for Southern Steel. She was part of the New Zealand team which won gold at the 2026 Commonwealth Games. Poi was a prominent member of the 2020 and 2021 Mainland Tactix teams that played in two successive grand finals.

== Early life, family and education ==
Kimiora is a Māori with Ngāti Porou affiliations. She was born in Gisborne, New Zealand. She is the daughter of Billy Poi and Roanne Baker. The Poi family lived in Tikitiki, where Roanne was the principal of the local school. Kimiora and her two sisters, Jade and Ashleigh, all attended Tikitiki School where they began playing netball. The family later moved to Napier, where Kimiora attended Napier Girls' High School. In 2016, while playing for Central Zone, she attended Victoria University, where she studied Criminology and Māori Studies. In 2017, after joining Mainland Tactix, she switched her studies to the University of Canterbury. Kimiora has three siblings, all of whom play sports. Her older brother, Morgan Poi, has played rugby union for Wellington Lions in the Mitre 10 Cup. Her two sisters have both played in the National Netball League. Ashleigh Poi has also played for the New Zealand Maori schoolgirl team.

== Club career ==
=== Central Zone ===
In 2016 and 2017, Poi played for Central Zone in the National Netball League. Her team mates included Karin Burger and Tiana Metuarau. She was a member of the Central Zone teams that were 2016 NNL grand finalists and 2017 NNL premiers.

=== Central Pulse ===
Ahead of the 2017 ANZ Premiership season, Poi was contracted as a training partner with Central Pulse. Poi's opportunities at Pulse were limited. She was kept out of the team by Claire Kersten, Whitney Souness, Mila Reuelu-Buchanan and Renee Savai'inaea. Despite this, on 8 May 2017, in a Round 7 match against Northern Stars, she made her ANZ Premiership debut with Pulse, making a brief three-minute appearance in the final quarter. It was her only match for Pulse.

=== Mainland Tactix ===
Since 2018, Poi has played for Mainland Tactix in the ANZ Premiership. She quickly established herself as regular member of the Tactix team. Together with Jane Watson, Erikana Pedersen and Te Paea Selby-Rickit, Poi was a prominent member of the 2020 and 2021 Mainland Tactix teams that played in two successive grand finals. Ahead of the 2022 season, Poi was appointed Tactix captain, taking over from the pregnant Jane Watson. She became the first Māori to captain Tactix.

=== Collingwood Magpies ===
In 2019, Poi briefly joined Collingwood Magpies in Suncorp Super Netball as a temporary replacement player, covering for the injured Madi Browne. Poi made her debut for Magpies in a Round 6 match against New South Wales Swifts. She went on to play seven games for Magpies. In Round 13, Poi played an integral role in a season highlight for Magpies when they defeated Swifts 64–56. Poi took to the court to replace Kelsey Browne after Browne went down with a knee injury in the second quarter.

=== Southern Steel ===
After the completion of the 2024 ANZ Premiership season and seven seasons with the Mainland Tactix, it was announced Poi would be joining the Southern Steel for the 2025 season.

== International career ==
Poi has represented New Zealand at schoolgirl, under-21, Fast5 and senior level. She was a member of the New Zealand team that won the 2017 Netball World Youth Cup. She was also a member of the team that won the 2018 Fast5 Netball World Series. On 13 January 2019, Poi made her senior debut for New Zealand in a 2019 Netball Quad Series match against England. On 26 January 2020, Poi made her first start during a 2020 Netball Nations Cup match against South Africa. In October 2020, New Zealand head coach, Noeline Taurua, highlighted Poi for her fitness levels. She was a member of the New Zealand team that won the 2021 Constellation Cup. Poi was named in the squad for the 2026 Commonwealth Games, where the Silver Ferns won their first Commonwealth Games gold medal in 16 years, defeating Jamaica in the final.

Tournaments	Place
2017 Netball World Youth Cup	1st place, gold medalist(s)
2018 Fast5 Netball World Series	1st place, gold medalist(s)
2019 Netball Quad Series	3rd
2020 Netball Nations Cup	1st
2021 Constellation Cup	1st
2021 Taini Jamison Trophy Series	2nd
2022 Constellation Cup	2nd
2022 Fast5 Netball World Series	3rd place, bronze medalist(s)
2024 Taini Jamison Trophy Series	2nd
2024 Constellation Cup	1st
2025 Taini Jamison Trophy Series	1st
2025 Constellation Cup	2nd
2025 New Zealand netball tour of Great Britain	
2026 Commonwealth Games	1st

== Statistics ==
Season	Team	G/A	GA	RB	CPR	FD	IC	DF	PN	TO	MP
2017	Pulse	0/0									1
2018	Tactix	0/0	?	0	0	?	17	31	105	36	15
2019	Tactix	0/0	167	0	8	330	9	38	123	59	15
2019	Magpies	0/0	35	0	60	54	2	3	25	15	7
2020	Tactix	0/0	147	0	0	321	11	35	75	39	15
2021	Tactix	0/0	176	0	0	469	13	34	100	41	17
2022	Tactix	0/0	200	0	0	412	14	30	71	31	14
2023	Tactix	0/0									
Career											

== Honours ==
=== New Zealand ===
- Commonwealth Games: 2026
- Constellation Cup: 2021, 2024
- Netball Nations Cup: 2020
- Taini Jamison Trophy: 2025
- Fast5 Netball World Series: 2018
- Netball World Youth Cup: 2017

=== Mainland Tactix ===
- ANZ Premiership: Runners Up: 2020, 2021
- Netball New Zealand Super Club: Runners Up: 2018

=== Central Zone ===
- National Netball League: 2017 Runners Up: 2016
