= Te Aroha Keenan =

New Zealand netball player

Personal information
- Full name: Te Aroha Keenan

Netball career
Years	National team	Caps
1982	New Zealand	3

Te Aroha Keenan is a New Zealand former netball coach and member of the Silver Ferns in the 1980s. She later coached the Cook Islands national team at the 1999 Netball World Championships, as well as a multinational Team Pasifika in a test series against New Zealand, the New Zealand U21 team which won the 2005 World Youth Netball Championships, and as of 2008 was the New Zealand A coach.

Keenan was signed as the assistant coach for the Northern Mystics in the inaugural season of the ANZ Championship. After a lacklustre first season for the Mystics, she replaced Yvonne Willering as head coach for the 2009 season. During her coaching role, she took leave as Deputy Principal at Mt Albert Grammar School in Auckland. After two years as head coach for the Mystics, Keenan was not wanted in 2010, with rumors that she was asked to leave due to an over recruitment of outside players and a lack of ability to develop players within the region. She would return to teaching. She then got picked up by Team Northumbria in the Netball Superleague where her daughter Tuaine Keenan plays at Goal Keeper.
