= Sulu Fitzpatrick =

New Zealand netball international

Personal information
- Full name: Toesulu Mauailegalu Tone Fitzpatrick
- Born: 20 August 1992 (age 34) Auckland, New Zealand
- Height: 1.88 m (6 ft 2 in)
- Relatives: Theresa Fitzpatrick (sister); Olo Brown (uncle); Tana Umaga (uncle)
- School: St Cuthbert's College
- University: University of Auckland

Netball career
- Playing positions: GK, WD, GD
| Years | Club team | Apps |
| 2010 | Northern Mystics | 1 |
| 2011–2012 | Waikato Bay of Plenty Magic | 16 |
| 2013 | Southern Steel | 13 |
| 2015–2016 | Northern Mystics | 22 |
| 2017 | Northern Stars | 15 |
| 2018–2019 | Central Pulse | 32 |
| 2020–2023 | Northern Mystics | 55 |
| Years | National team | Caps |
| 2011–2023 | New Zealand | 27 |
Medal record
Representing New Zealand
Fast5 Netball World Series
| Gold medal – first place | 2018 Melbourne | Team |
| Silver medal – second place | 2011 Liverpool | Team |
Commonwealth Games
| Bronze medal – third place | 2022 Birmingham | Team |

Sulu Fitzpatrick (born 20 August 1992), also known as Sulu Tone-Fitzpatrick, is a former New Zealand netball international. She was a member of the New Zealand team that won the 2021 Constellation Cup and represented New Zealand at the 2022 Commonwealth Games. She captained New Zealand when they won the 2018 Fast5 Netball World Series and again during the 2021 Taini Jamison Trophy Series. During the ANZ Championship era, Fitzpatrick played for Northern Mystics, Waikato Bay of Plenty Magic and Southern Steel. During the ANZ Premiership era, she played for Mystics, Northern Stars and Central Pulse. During her career, she played for every ANZ Premiership team except Mainland Tactix. She was a member of four premiership winning teams – the 2012 Waikato Bay of Plenty Magic, the 2019 Central Pulse, the 2021 Northern Mystics and the 2023 Northern Mystics. She captained Mystics when they won both premierships. In 2021, Fitzpatrick received the Dame Lois Muir Supreme Award. In 2022, she was included on a list of the 25 best players to feature in netball leagues in New Zealand since 1998.

== Early life, family and education ==
Toesulu Mauailegalu Tone Fitzpatrick was born and raised in Auckland. She is of Samoan descent. She is named after her grandmother, Toesulu Brown, the first woman in her family to migrate to New Zealand. During the 1960s, she migrated from Samoa on an education scholarship. She subsequently worked as a teacher at Auckland Girls' Grammar School for thirty years. Fitzpatrick's birth parents are Olive and Konelio Tone. She has a close relationship with them, and her three biological siblings in Samoa and Australia. However, Sulu was whangai'd and raised mainly by her aunt and uncle, Rosie and Greg Fitzpatrick. Rosie is her birth mother's sister. The Fitzpatrick family lived in Mount Albert. Sulu considers Rosie and Greg to be her parents. Two of her uncles, Olo Brown and Tana Umaga, were New Zealand rugby union internationals. Her younger sister, Theresa Fitzpatrick is a New Zealand women's rugby union international. The Fitzpatrick sisters both represented New Zealand at the 2022 Commonwealth Games, Theresa with the New Zealand women's national rugby sevens team.

Fitzpatrick attended Richmond Road Primary in Grey Lynn. For high school, she attended St Cuthbert's College where she was deputy head girl. Throughout her netball career, she also attended the University of Auckland. Fitzpatrick is the mother of twins, Tevita and Theresa. The latter was named after her sister. They were born on Boxing Day 2013. She is in a relationship with Andrew who has two boys, Mason and Harley. Since 2017, Fitzpatrick has had a Malu to honour her late grandfather, Sola Brown.

== Playing career ==
=== ANZ Championship ===
==== Northern Mystics (2010) ====
Tone-Fitzpatrick was recruited by Northern Mystics while she was still attending St Cuthbert's College. She was aged 17 and still attending St Cuthbert's, when she made her ANZ Championship debut with Mystics during the 2010 season. However, during her 2010 spell with Mystics she played just one quarter of one match.

==== Waikato Bay of Plenty Magic ====
In 2011 and 2012, Tone-Fitzpatrick made 16 senior appearances for Waikato Bay of Plenty Magic. During the 2011 season, she formed a very effective partnership with Casey Williams and was subsequently nominated as Best Young Player. In 2011, while playing for Magic, Tone-Fitzpatrick made her senior debut for New Zealand. However she was only a bit-part player as Magic won the 2012 ANZ Championship as she found herself kept out of the team by Leana de Bruin.

==== Southern Steel ====
In 2013, Tone-Fitzpatrick made 13 senior appearances for Southern Steel. She formed a defensive partnership with Rachel Rasmussen, keeping Storm Purvis out of the team. While playing for Steel, Tone-Fitzpatrick became pregnant and she would subsequently miss the 2014 season.

==== Northern Mystics (2015–2016) ====
In 2015 and 2016, Tone-Fitzpatrick made 22 senior appearances for Northern Mystics. On 16 May 2016, in a Round 7 match against Central Pulse, Fitzpatrick made her 50th senior league appearance. However, Fitzpatrick's relationship with Mystics head coach Debbie Fuller became strained and she subsequently found herself dropped from the starting seven.

=== ANZ Premiership ===
==== Northern Stars ====
In 2017, Fitzpatrick made 15 senior appearances for Northern Stars. She was a member of the inaugural Stars squad. Fitzpatrick suffered an ACL injury during preseason. Normally, a season-ending injury, in Fitzpatrick's case, medical staff took the rare step of opting not to do surgery, as they determined the muscles that support her knee were strong enough to compensate for being short a ligament. Aided by layers of strapping tape, she managed to complete the season.

==== Central Pulse ====
In 2018 and 2019, Fitzpatrick made 32 appearances for Central Pulse. She was a prominent member of the Pulse teams that won two minor premierships, the 2018 Netball New Zealand Super Club tournament and the 2019 ANZ Premiership. Her 2018 performance with Pulse saw Fitzpatrick recalled for New Zealand after a seven-year absence. Fitzpatrick pays credit to Pulse for reviving her netball career when she thought it was over.

==== Northern Mystics (2020–2023) ====
Between 2020 and 2023, during her third spell with the team, Fitzpatrick made 55 senior appearances for Northern Mystics. On 15 March 2020, in a Round 1 against Northern Stars, Fitzpatrick made her 100th senior league appearance. In February 2021, Fitzpatrick was announced as the new Mystics captain. She subsequently captained the 2021 Northern Mystics when they won their first ANZ Premiership title. In December 2021, Fitzpatrick received the Dame Lois Muir Supreme Award. In January 2022, Fitzpatrick contracted COVID-19. In April 2022, she was included on a list of the 25 best players to feature in netball leagues in New Zealand since 1998. In May 2022, Fitzpatrick announced that she would retire after the 2023 Netball World Cup. On 6 May 2023, in a Round 10 against Southern Steel, Fitzpatrick made her 150th senior league appearance. Ahead of the 2023 grand final, she confirmed her decision to retire. Fitzpatrick subsequently captained the 2023 Northern Mystics as they won their second ANZ Premiership title.

=== New Zealand ===
Tone-Fitzpatrick represented New Zealand at schoolgirl and under-21 level. In 2010 she captained the New Zealand Secondary Schools team to victory in an International Schoolgirls Tournament. She also captained the under-21 team. On 3 October 2011, Tone-Fitzpatrick made her senior debut for New Zealand against England during the 2011 Taini Jamison Trophy Series. She was introduced at goalkeeper for the final quarter. She also played for New Zealand at the 2011 World Netball Series. However, Fitzpatrick would have to wait another seven years before been recalled to the senior New Zealand team for the 2018 Constellation Cup. She captained the New Zealand team that won the 2018 Fast5 Netball World Series. She was a member of the New Zealand team that won the 2021 Constellation Cup. In September 2023, Fitzpatrick was named as vice captain to Gina Crampton. On 22 September 2021, in the absence of an injured Crampton, Fitzpatrick captained New Zealand against England during the 2021 Taini Jamison Trophy Series. She was a member of the New Zealand team that were bronze medalists at the 2022 Commonwealth Games.

| Tournaments | Place |
|---|---|
| 2011 Taini Jamison Trophy Series | 1st |
| 2011 World Netball Series | 2nd |
| 2018 Constellation Cup | 2nd |
| 2018 Fast5 Netball World Series | 1st |
| 2020 Taini Jamison Trophy Series | 1st |
| 2021 Constellation Cup | 1st |
| 2021 Taini Jamison Trophy Series | 2nd |
| 2022 Netball Quad Series | 3rd |
| 2022 Commonwealth Games | 3rd place, bronze medalist(s) |
| 2022 Taini Jamison Trophy Series | 1st |
| 2022 Constellation Cup | 2nd |
| 2023 Netball Quad Series | 2nd |

== Statistics ==
| Season | Team | G/A | GA | RB | CPR | FD | IC | DF | PN | TO | MP |
|---|---|---|---|---|---|---|---|---|---|---|---|
| 2010 | Mystics | 0/0 | | | | | | | | | 1 |
| 2011 | Magic | 0/0 | 1 | 8 | 12 | ? | 15 | 30 | 92 | 8 | |
| 2012 | Magic | 0/0 | | | | | | | | | |
| 2013 | Steel | 0/0 | | | | | | | | | 13 |
| 2014 | ^{(Note 2)} | 0/0 | 0 | 0 | 0 | 0 | 0 | 0 | 0 | 0 | 0 |
| 2015 | Mystics | 0/0 | | | | | | | | | |
| 2016 | Mystics | 0/0 | | | | | | | | | |
| 2017 | Stars | 0/0 | ? | 14 | 0 | ? | 25 | 41 | 129 | 3 | 15 |
| 2018 | Pulse | 0/0 | ? | 22 | 0 | ? | 30 | 55 | 197 | 15 | 16 |
| 2019 | Pulse | 0/0 | 0 | 35 | 2 | 0 | 22 | 63 | 151 | 8 | 16 |
| 2020 | Mystics | 0/0 | 0 | 23 | 3 | 0 | 16 | 58 | 100 | 1 | 13 |
| 2021 | Mystics | 0/0 | 2 | 30 | 16 | 4 | 21 | 58 | 116 | 9 | 16 |
| 2022 | Mystics | 0/0 | 0 | 38 | 2 | 0 | 19 | 65 | 106 | 7 | 16 |
| 2023 | Mystics | 0/0 | ? | 12 | 2 | 0 | 8 | 22 | 68 | 2 | 10 |
| Career | | | | | | | | | | | 154 |

Notes

- ^1 Between 2010 and 2016, Fitzpatrick made 52 ANZ Championship appearances for Northern Mystics, Waikato Bay of Plenty Magic and Southern Steel.
- ^2 Fitzpatrick missed the 2014 season due to pregnancy.

== Rugby sevens ==
Tone-Fitzpatrick was included in the Samoa women's national rugby sevens team for the 2015 New Zealand Women's Sevens Series.

== Personal life ==
Fitzpatrick has spoken openly about her family life, her mental health battles, struggling with depression and anxiety, food and alcohol issues, her pregnancy and the pressures of being both a mother and netball player.

== Honours ==
New Zealand

- Constellation Cup
  - Winners: 2021
- Taini Jamison Trophy
  - Winners: 2011, 2020, 2022
- Fast5 Netball World Series
  - Winners: 2018

Northern Mystics

- ANZ Premiership
  - Winners: 2021, 2023
  - Minor premiers: 2021, 2023

Central Pulse

- ANZ Premiership
  - Winners: 2019
  - Minor premiers: 2019
- Netball New Zealand Super Club
  - Winners: 2018

Waikato Bay of Plenty Magic

- ANZ Championship
  - Winners: 2012

Individual Awards

| Year | Award |
|---|---|
| 2021 | Dame Lois Muir Supreme Award |
