= Debbie Fuller (netball) =

New Zealand netball player and coach

Personal information
- Full name: Debbie Fuller (Née: Matoe)

Netball career
- Playing positions: GD, GK, WD
Years	Club team	Apps
1998	Canterbury Flames	
1999–2002	Capital Shakers	
Years	National team	Caps
1993–96	New Zealand	
Coaching career
- Years: Team
- 2011–12, 2014–16: Northern Mystics
- 2018–present: New Zealand (asst)
Medal record
Representing New Zealand
Netball World Championships
Bronze medal – third place	1995 Birmingham	Netball
- Updated on 22 July 2019

Debbie Fuller (née Matoe) is a New Zealand netball coach and former international netball player.

== History ==
Fuller was a defender in the New Zealand national netball team, the Silver Ferns, from 1993 to 1996, during which time she competed at the 1995 Netball World Championships in Birmingham. Fuller retired from the Silver Ferns after 1996, spending a year in Argentina. She returned for the 1997 provincial season, and the following year captained Canterbury in the inaugural National Bank Cup. Fuller moved to the Capital Shakers in 1999, playing with the Wellington-based side until her retirement in 2002.

After coaching stints in Wellington and the Bay of Plenty, Fuller accepted a position as a defensive coach with the ANZ Championship side the Northern Mystics for the 2009 season, under new head coach Te Aroha Keenan. She was promoted to assistant coach of the Auckland-based team the following year. Keenan departed the Mystics after the 2010 season, with Fuller being appointed as the Mystics head coach for 2011. She continued in the role until 2016, while taking a year off in 2014. In 2018, Fuller was appointed as assistant head coach of the Silver Ferns, under head coach and former teammate Noeline Taurua. During her time as assistant coach, the Silver Ferns won both the 2018 Fast5 Netball World Series and the 2019 Netball World Cup tournaments.

In July 2026 she was at Commonwealth Games in Glasgow as the coach of the Malawi national netball team.
