= Northern Mystics =

New Zealand netball team

- Founded: 2007
- Based in: Auckland
- Regions: Auckland Region; Northland Region
- Home venue: The Trusts Arena
- Head coach: Tia Winikerei
- Captain: Michaela Sokolich-Beatson
- Premierships: 4 (2021, 2023, 2024, 2026)
- League: ANZ Premiership
- Website: northernmystics.co.nz
Uniform
Uniform

Northern Mystics are a New Zealand netball team based in Auckland. Between 2008 and 2016, they played in the ANZ Championship. Since 2017 they have represented Netball Northern in the ANZ Premiership. Netball Northern is the governing body that represents the Auckland and Northland Regions. The Mystics have won four ANZ Premiership titles in 2021, 2023, 2024 and 2026.

== History ==
=== Formation ===
Northern Mystics were formed in 2007. The new team was effectively a merger of the two former National Bank Cup teams, Northern Force and Auckland Diamonds. Mystics subsequently became founder members of the ANZ Championship. Yvonne Willering became Mystics first head coach and Temepara George became Mystics first player.

=== ANZ Championship ===
Between 2008 and 2016, Mystics played in the ANZ Championship. On 6 April 2008, Mystics made their ANZ Championship debut in a match against Canterbury Tactix at The Trusts Arena, losing 44–48.

In 2011, with a team coached by Debbie Fuller and captained by Temepara George, Mystics reached their first grand final. They finished the regular season fourth behind Queensland Firebirds, Waikato Bay of Plenty Magic and New South Wales Swifts. During the regular season, Mystics claimed their first win in Australia, with a 56–54 win over West Coast Fever in Round 9. Mystics defeated Swifts in the minor semi-final and Magic in the preliminary final before losing to Firebirds in the grand final. Mystics finished the season second overall.

In 2012, Mystics finished second on the table after the regular season. However, they subsequently lost the major semi-final to Melbourne Vixens and the preliminary final to Magic and finished in third overall. On 20 May 2012, during a Round 8 match against Vixens, Mystics introduced the Harrison Hoist. Anna Harrison made several vital blocks while being hoisted rugby union lineout-style by her defensive partners. Harrison was lifted first by Kayla Cullen and then twice in the final quarter by Jessica Moulds. Mystics won the match 49–45. Cullen and Moulds adopted the role of a lineout lifter to hoist Harrison and the move had the desired result in the final quarter when Vixens goal shooter Karyn Howarth's goal-bound shots were twice batted away.

In 2015, Mystics went through the regular season unbeaten against their fellow New Zealand teams and topped the New Zealand Conference. However they subsequently lost the Conference final to Magic and a semi-final to Firebirds.

Regular season statistics

Season	Position	Won	Drawn	Lost
2008	7th	5	0	8
2009	8th	3	0	10
2010	6th	7	0	6
2011	4th	9	0	4
2012	2nd	10	0	3
2013	10th	1	0	12
2014	7th	6	0	7
2015	4th	7	2	4
2016	7th	3	1	9

Grand finalists
New Zealand Conference minor premiers

=== ANZ Premiership ===
Since 2017, Mystics have played in the ANZ Premiership. In 2021, with a team coached by Helene Wilson and captained by Sulu Fitzpatrick and featuring Ama Agbeze, Bailey Mes and Grace Nweke, Mystics won their first ever premiership. After finishing the regular season as minor premiers, they defeated Mainland Tactix 61–59 in the grand final. In 2023, with a team coached by Tia Winikerei, captained by Sulu Fitzpatrick and featuring Phoenix Karaka, Grace Nweke, Michaela Sokolich-Beatson and Peta Toeava, Mystics won their second title. Mystics finished the regular season as minor premiers, finishing above Central Pulse and Northern Stars. Mystics defeated Stars 74–56 in the Grand final.

Regular season statistics

Season	Position	Won	Drawn	Lost
2017	3rd	8	0	7
2018	4th	7	0	8
2019	6th	4	0	11
2020	3rd	7	2	6
2021	1st	11	0	4
2022	3rd	9	0	6
2023	1st	11	0	4
2024	3rd	9	0	6
2025	1st	9	0	1

Minor Premiers and Premiership
Premiership

== Grand finals ==
ANZ Championship

Season	Winners	Score	Runners up	Venue
2011	Queensland Firebirds	57–44	Northern Mystics	Brisbane Convention & Exhibition Centre

Netball New Zealand Super Club

Season	Winners	Score	Runners up	Venue
2017	Southern Steel	79–58	Northern Mystics	Trafalgar Centre
2019	Collingwood Magpies	49–42	Northern Mystics	Trafalgar Centre

ANZ Premiership

Season	Winners	Score	Runners up	Venue
2021	Northern Mystics	61–59	Mainland Tactix	Spark Arena
2023	Northern Mystics	74–56	Northern Stars	Globox Arena
2024	Northern Mystics	54–53	Central Pulse	TSB Bank Arena
2025	Northern Mystics	46–58	Mainland Tactix	Trusts Arena
2026	Northern Mystics	56–46	Southern Steel	Trusts Arena

== Home venues ==
Mystics main home venue is The Trusts Arena.

	Years
The Trusts Arena	2008–
Eventfinda Stadium/North Shore Events Centre	2008–
Vector Arena/Spark Arena	2011–

== Notable players ==
=== 2026 squad ===
2026 Northern Mystics roster
Players
Coaching staff

Nat.	Name	Position(s)	DoB	Height
(New Zealand)	Catherine Hall	GK,GD	16 December 2003 (age 22)	1.91 m (6 ft 3 in)
(New Zealand)	Michaela Sokolich-Beatson (c)	WD,GD	2 October 1996 (age 30)	1.84 m (6 ft 0 in)
(New Zealand)	Tayla Earle	C,WD,WA	22 April 2000 (age 26)	1.74 m (5 ft 9 in)
(New Zealand)	Phoenix Karaka	GK,GD	6 November 1993 (age 33)	1.86 m (6 ft 1 in)
(New Zealand)	Maia Wilson	GS, GA	21 September 1997 (age 29)	1.87 m (6 ft 2 in)
(New Zealand)	Katie Te Ao	WD,C	15 April 2001 (age 25)	1.8 m (5 ft 11 in)
(New Zealand)	Elisapeta Toeava	WA,C	10 March 1994 (age 32)	1.61 m (5 ft 3 in)
(New Zealand)	Filda Vui	GS, GA, WA	16 April 1996 (age 30)	1.80 m (5 ft 11 in)
(New Zealand)	Charlotte Manley	GK, GD	8 October 2004 (age 22)	1.88 m (6 ft 2 in)
(New Zealand)	Sophia Lafaiali'i	GS	27 May 2005 (age 21)	1.89 m (6 ft 2 in)

Head coach

- Tia Winikerel

Assistant coach

- Rob Wright

Notes

- (c) – Captain
- (cc) – Co-captain
- (vc) – Vice-captain
- – Injury / maternity leave
- (TRP) – Temporary Replacement Player
Player profiles: Team website
Last updated: 19 February 2026

=== Internationals ===
New Zealand

- Jenny-May Coffin
- Vilimaina Davu
- Leana de Bruin
- Tayla Earle
- Temalisi Fakahokotau
- Monica Falkner
- Sulu Fitzpatrick
- Maria Folau
- Temepara George
- Paula Griffin
- Catherine Hall
- Anna Harrison
- Joline Henry
- Kayla Johnson
- Grace Kara
- Phoenix Karaka
- Camilla Lees
- Laura Langman
- Bailey Mes
- Erena Mikaere
- Grace Nweke
- Erikana Pedersen
- Storm Purvis
- Sheryl Scanlan
- Michaela Sokolich-Beatson
- Carys Stythe
- Teresa Tairi
- Elisapeta Toeava
- Jessica Tuki
- Cathrine Tuivaiti
- Malia Vaka
- Debbie White
- Larrissa Willcox

New Zealand Fast5

- Charlotte Kight
- Jessica Moulds
- Rachel Rasmussen
- Hayley Saunders

Australia

- Julie Corletto
- Megan Dehn
- Donnell Wallam

England

- Ama Agbeze
- Jade Clarke
- Pamela Cookey
- Sasha Corbin
- Serena Guthrie

Fiji

- Vilimaina Davu

Jamaica

- Althea Byfield

Samoa

- Rachel Rasmussen
- Sheryl Scanlan
- Saviour Tui
- Cathrine Tuivaiti

South Africa

- Leana de Bruin

=== Captains ===
	Years
Temepara George	2008–2012
Maria Tutaia	2013–2017
Anna Harrison	2017–2018
Phoenix Karaka	2019–2020
Sulu Fitzpatrick	2021–2023
Michaela Sokolich-Beatson	2024–

=== Award winners ===
==== ANZ Championship awards ====
ANZ Championship MVP

Season	Player
2012	Temepara George ^{(Note 1)}

Notes

- ^1 Temepara George shared the award with Laura Langman (Waikato Bay of Plenty Magic).

ANZ Championship Best New Talent

Season	Player
2011	Kayla Cullen
2015	Serena Guthrie

==== New Zealand Netball Awards ====
New Zealand ANZ Championship Player of the Year

Season	Winner
2015	Laura Langman

Dame Lois Muir Supreme Award

Season	Winner
2021	Sulu Fitzpatrick

== Coaches ==
=== Head coaches ===
Coach	Years
Yvonne Willering	2007–2008
Te Aroha Keenan	2009–2010
Debbie Fuller	2010–2012
Ruth Aitken	2013
Debbie Fuller	2013–2016
Helene Wilson	2017–2022
Tia Winikerei	2023–

=== Assistant coaches ===
Coach	Years
Te Aroha Keenan	2008
Debbie Fuller	2009–2010
Jenny-May Coffin	2011
Gail Parata	2012
Kiri Wills	2013
Helene Wilson	2014
Linda Vagana	2018–2019
Sonya Hardcastle	2018–2019
Margaret Forsyth	2020
Tia Winikerei	2021–2022
Rob Wright	2021–

=== Specialist coaches ===
Coach	Years
Megan Dehn	2012
Jenny-May Coffin	2017

== Main sponsors ==
Sponsors	Seasons
LG Electronics	2007–2015
SkyCity Entertainment Group	2015–2018
MG Motor New Zealand	2021–

== Reserve team ==
Since 2016, Netball Northern have entered a team in the National Netball League. In 2017 they became known as Northern Marvels. They are effectively the reserve team of Northern Mystics. Helene Wilson was their inaugural head coach. Former Marvels players include Elisapeta Toeava and Grace Nweke. In 2021 Northern Marvels were NNL premiers after they defeated Northern Comets 64–56 in the grand final.

== Honours ==
- ANZ Premiership
  - Winners: 2021, 2023, 2024, 2026
  - Runners Up: 2025
  - Minor premiers: 2021, 2023, 2025, 2026
- ANZ Championship
  - Runners Up: 2011
- ANZ Championship – New Zealand Conference
  - Minor premiers: 2015
- Netball New Zealand Super Club
  - Runners Up: 2017, 2019
