= Temepara Bailey =

New Zealand netball player

Temepara Bailey MNZM
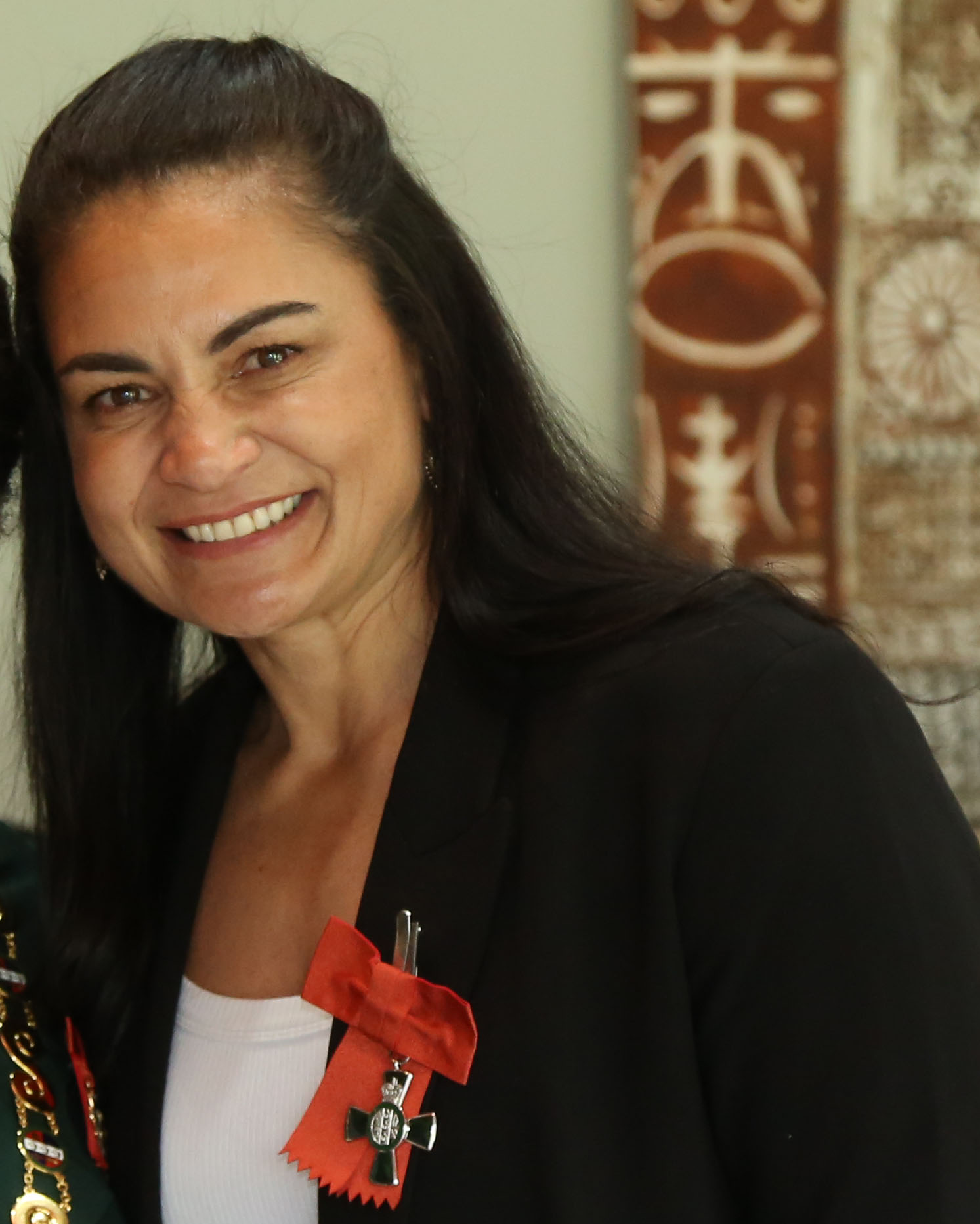
- Bailey in 2024

Personal information
- Full name: Temepara Anne Bailey (Née: George)
- Born: 23 October 1975 (age 51) Auckland, New Zealand
- Height: 1.70 m (5 ft 7 in)

Netball career
- Playing positions: C, WA
Years	Club team	Apps
1998	Auckland Diamonds	
1999	Counties Manukau Cometz	
2000–2007	Northern Force	
2008–2012	Northern Mystics	55
2019	Northern Stars	
Years	National team	Caps
1994–1996	New Zealand U21	
1996–2011	New Zealand	89
Medal record
Representing New Zealand
World Netball Championships
Gold medal – first place	2003 Kingston	Tournament
Silver medal – second place	2011 Singapore	Tournament
Commonwealth Games
Gold medal – first place	2006 Melbourne	Tournament
Gold medal – first place	2010 Delhi	Tournament
World Netball Series
Gold medal – first place	2009 Manchester	Fastnet

Temepara Anne Bailey MNZM (formerly Clark, née George; born 23 October 1975 in Auckland) is a New Zealand international netball player of Samoan and Māori descent. She was a member of the Silver Ferns national squad in 1996, and from 2000–2011. George retired from international duties after the 2011 World Netball Championships in Singapore. She played domestic netball in the ANZ Championship as captain of the Northern Mystics. Since the inaugural season, George has taken part in every quarter for the Mystics. She retired from all netball in 2012. She is the mother of current New Zealand Warriors star Erin Clark.

She made a come back as a player for the Northern Stars in the 2019 ANZ Championship. She was previously on the coaching bench for the same team.

== Early career ==
George was spotted as a talent in netball early, being selected for the Silver Ferns squad in 1996. She took time off the following year with the birth of her second child, and subsequentsly continued with the New Zealand A team and Silver Ferns training squad. With the start of the Coca-Cola Cup in 1998, George signed with the Auckland Diamonds for the league's inaugural year. In 1999, George transferred to cross-town rivals the Counties Manukau Cometz, under coach Ruth Aitken. In 2000, she transferred again, this time to the Northland-based Northern Force, where she continued playing until the end of the competition in 2007.

== Silver Ferns debut ==
George was selected again for the Silver Ferns in 2000, and later that year made her debut against Australia. The next several years saw George make her mark on the international circuit and cement her position in the Silver Ferns midcourt. She missed out on the Silver Ferns team for the 2002 Commonwealth Games in Manchester, but the following year was named in the team for the 2003 World Netball Championships in Kingston, Jamaica. New Zealand progressed to the final of the tournament, which they contested with Australia. During the final, George was sent off for three goals due to accruing 10 deliberate contact fouls, but the Silver Ferns eventually defeated Australia by 49–47 to win the tournament. She was the first player to be sent off in any level of competition. Her performance also earned her the Albie Pryor Memorial Sports Person of the Year at the Māori Sports Awards. George won another gold medal three years later at the 2006 Commonwealth Games in Melbourne.

== Withdrawal in 2007 ==
In the leadup to the 2007 World Netball Championships, Temepara George announced on 30 July that year that she was standing down from international netball. She moved to Townsville, Queensland to live with her then-partner, rugby league player Sione Faumuina, who had accepted a contract with the North Queensland Cowboys. George's absence from the Silver Ferns was widely believed to have decreased the team's chances at the upcoming World Championships in Auckland. New Zealand finished second at the 2007 World Championships, behind Australia.

With the start of a new netball competition in 2008, the ANZ Championship, replacing the National Bank Cup, Temepara George considered signing with the Queensland Firebirds while living in Queensland. She eventually turned down the Firebirds in favour of returning to New Zealand, and signed with the Auckland-based Northern Mystics franchise.

That same year, Temepara George was a contestant on the New Zealand version of Dancing with the Stars. George went on to win the 2008 show, partnered with Stefano Olivieri. In 2009 George appeared on the New Zealand travel programme Intrepid Journeys, travelling to Darjeeling and Sikkim.

== Return to international netball ==
In 2009, Temepara George announced her availability for the national team, and committed to playing with the Silver Ferns until at least the 2011 World Netball Championships. She was subsequently selected for the inaugural World Netball Series in Manchester, which the Silver Ferns won with a 32–27 victory over Jamaica in the final. George travelled to Delhi the following year for the 2010 Commonwealth Games, winning gold with the Silver Ferns after an epic 66–64 gold medal playoff against Australia. Injury forced her out of the side for the three-test series against England in early 2011. She recovered in time for the start of the 2011 ANZ Championship season. The Mystics had their best ever campaign in 2011, qualifying for their first finals series, before finishing runners-up in the grand final. George was recalled into the Silver Ferns for the 2011 World Championships in Singapore. The Silver Ferns progressed to the gold medal match against perennial rivals Australia, and in another overtime match New Zealand were defeated 58–57.

== International retirement ==
After the World Championships, George retired from international netball at the age of 35, having played in 89 test matches for the Silver Ferns. She continued to captain the Northern Mystics in the ANZ Championship for a further season.

In the 2012 Queen's Birthday and Diamond Jubilee Honours, George was appointed a Member of the New Zealand Order of Merit, for services to netball.

Awards and achievements
Preceded by Suzanne Paul & Stefano Olivieri	Dancing with the Stars winner (with partner Stefano Olivieri); Season 4 (2008)	Succeeded by Tāmati Coffey & Samantha Hitchcock
