= Monica Falkner =

New Zealand netball player

Personal information
- Born: 8 April 1996 (age 30)
- Height: 1.81 m (5 ft 11 in)

Netball career
- Playing positions: GA, GS
Years	Club team	Apps
2017	Waikato Bay of Plenty Magic	
2021	Northern Stars	
2022	Northern Mystics	
Years	National team	Caps
2020-	New Zealand	3
Medal record
Representing New Zealand
Netball World Youth Cup
Gold medal – first place	2017 Gaborone, Botswana
Fast5 Netball World Series
Gold medal – first place	2018 Melbourne

Monica Falkner (born 1996) is a netball player from New Zealand. As of the end of 2021, she had represented the New Zealand national netball team on three occasions.

== Early life ==
Monica Falkner was born on 8 April 1996 in Ōpōtiki in the eastern Bay of Plenty in the North Island of New Zealand. Falkner is descended from the Māori people of Tūhoe and Whakatohea. She was brought up by her father on a farm in the Waimana valley of Whakatāne District in the Bay of Plenty region and attended Trident High School in Whakatāne. She started to play netball at the age of eight.

== Netball career ==
Falkner joined the Waikato Bay of Plenty Magic for the 2017 season, playing in the Goal shooter (GS) and Goal attack (GA) positions. That year she was selected to play for the New Zealand Youth Team in the 2017 Netball World Youth Cup. The tournament was won by New Zealand. She was selected for the full national squad, known as the Silver Ferns, for 2017-18 but did not play in any matches, although she did play in the 2018 Fast5 Netball World Series which New Zealand won. At the end of 2019 she suffered an anterior cruciate ligament injury, a common problem for netball players, and was out of the game for 15 months. After recovering, she made her debut for the Silver Ferns in October 2020, against England in the 2020 Taini Jamison Trophy Series, being the 176th women to play for the team. For the 2021 season she joined the Northern Stars but her playing time was limited by a further injury to the same knee. She transferred to the Northern Mystics for the 2022 season.
