= Grace Nweke =

New Zealand netball international

Personal information
- Born: 7 February 2002 (age 24) Auckland, New Zealand
- Height: 1.93 m (6 ft 4 in)
- School: Avondale College, ACG Sunderland
- University: University of Auckland

Netball career
- Playing position: GS
| Years | Club team | Apps |
| 2019–2024 | Northern Mystics | |
| 2025–present | New South Wales Swifts | |
| Years | National team | Caps |
| 2021–2026 | New Zealand | 49 |
Medal record
Women's netball
Representing New Zealand
Commonwealth Games
| Gold medal – first place | 2026 Glasgow | Team |
| Bronze medal – third place | 2022 Birmingham | Team |

Grace Nweke (born February 7, 2002) is a New Zealand netball international, who plays for the New South Wales Swifts in the Suncorp Super Netball. She was part of the New Zealand team which won gold at the 2026 Commonwealth Games.

== Early life ==
Grace Nweke was born in Auckland on 7 February 2002, to Chidinma and Fortune Nweke who were both born and raised in Nigeria. Her parents were living in South Korea when in 2000 they decided to emigrate to New Zealand, settling in Auckland. She has a twin brother and four other siblings, two of whom are also twins. She attended ACG Sunderland from years 9 to 10 then transferred to Avondale College. At Avondale College she competed in high jump events as well as netball. Nweke is studying for a Bachelor of Commerce degree in information systems and marketing at the University of Auckland.

== Club career ==
=== Northern Mystics ===
Nweke joined the Northern Mystics for the 2019 ANZ Premiership season, while she was still at school. Initially recruited to be a training partner she was rapidly promoted to being a full-time member of the Mystics squad. In 2021 she set a new ANZ Premiership scoring record, scoring 852 goals from 951 attempts and scoring 50 or more goals in 12 of the Mystics' 16 games. Her performances inevitably brought her to the attention of the national selectors, who selected her initially for the Under-21 side and then for the full 2021-22 New Zealand squad. Nweke missed four matches of the 2022 ANZ Premiership season due to an ankle injury; she was cleared to play the Grand Final but the Northern Mystics were defeated by the Northern Stars Nweke was sidelined once again half way through the 2024 ANZ Premiership season with a knee injury.

=== NSW Swifts ===
After the 2024 ANZ Premiership season had completed, Nweke was announced to play for the NSW Swifts for the 2025 Suncorp Super Netball season, making her still eligible for the Silver Ferns 2024 season but not the 2025. Nweke was voted Most Valuable Player for the Swifts 2025 season and was resigned with the NSW Swifts for the 2026 season.. After the Commonwealth Games Nweke announced she was not returning to the Swifts for the 2027 season.

=== Sydney Sirens ===
In 2026 she signed a three-year contract to play for the Sydney Sirens beginning in the 2027 season.

== International career ==
=== New Zealand ===
Despite her 2019 performance in the ANZ Premiership, Nweke was not selected for the 2019 Netball World Cup by Noeline Taurua, who cited fitness issues and her age. Nweke made her national debut on 22 September 2021 against England in a 2021 Taini Jamison Trophy Series match but this ended in disappointment as the team lost 55-45. In 2021 she was nominated at the Halberg Awards for the Emerging Talent Award but lost out to swimmer Erika Fairweather. Nweke was selected for the 2022 Commonwealth Games and was noted as having a standout performance in the Bronze medal final against England, when New Zealand won 55-48. Nweke's stellar performance was again followed up in the 2022 Constellation Cup against the Australian Diamonds having never come up against Australian players her shooting form was noted as being flawless, despite this, the Silver Ferns ended up losing the tournament 2-2 to the Australian Diamonds. Nweke was selected for the 2023 Netball Quad Series and was the only player of the Silver Ferns team to play four full games, however the Silver Ferns lost to the Australian Diamonds in the final 56-50. Further recognition and praise was gained when she won the best shooter and overall player of the series. Nweke was selected for the 2023 Netball World Cup, however she obtained a patella tear during a game against Singapore and was ruled out for the rest of the contest. Nweke was cleared to play on managed time for the last two games of the 2023 Constellation Cup her game play was attributed to the Silver Ferns winning the last two games of the series. Nweke was granted an exception to play for the Silver Ferns for the 2025/26 season

Nweke captained the third game of the Taini Jamison Trophy series where the Silver Ferns beat the South African Proteas 3-0. At the trophy award presentation Nweke asked for the microphone and issued thanks to the recently stood down coach Noeline Taurua with pleas for the coaches return, although unexpected the speech was met with a lot of praise for the young athlete.

Nweke was named in the squad for the 2026 Commonwealth Games, where the Silver Ferns won their first Commonwealth Games gold medal in 16 years, defeating Jamaica in the final. With 229 goals, she was the top shooter at the games, with a 90.5 percent shooting accuracy.

== Awards and honours ==
At the 2022 Netball awards Nweke was awarded the Dame Lois Muir Supreme Award shared with fellow Silver Ferns player Kelly Jury, as well as the Silver Ferns Player of the Year .

Grace Nweke was named player of the series and became the first recipient of the Plummer-Aitken Medal, a new award named after Norma Plummer and Ruth Aitken and presented to the standout player of the Constellation Cup. She scored 172 goals from 183 attempts (94%) across the four tests as New Zealand won the series 3-1.

She has been a member of teams that have won the following:

=== New Zealand ===
- Commonwealth Games: Gold: 2026 Bronze: 2022

=== Northern Mystics ===
- ANZ Premiership: 2021, 2023, 2024

== Personal life ==
On her way back from competing in Commonwealth Games in Glasgow in 2026 she visited Nigeria for the first time in her life. While there Nweke coached and mentored a group of girls aged 14 to 20 in Lagos, for the Coming Home programme.
