= Michaela Sokolich-Beatson =

New Zealand netball player

Personal information
- Born: 2 October 1996 (age 30) Auckland, New Zealand
- Height: 1.84 m (6 ft 1/2 in)
- School: Whangaparāoa College

Netball career
- Playing positions: GD, WD
Years	Club team	Apps
2016–present	Northern Mystics	111
Years	National team	Caps
2018, 2024–present	New Zealand	14
- Updated on 18 July 2025

Michaela Sokolich-Beatson (born 2 October 1996 in Auckland, New Zealand) is a New Zealand netball player. She plays for the Northern Mystics in the ANZ Premiership, having debuted in 2016.

== Early life ==
Sokolich-Beatson grew up on the Hibiscus Coast and started playing netball as a Year 6 at Whangaparāoa Primary on a team coached by her mother. She attended high school at Whangaparāoa College. She was initially a shooter, before switching to defence in Year 12. In 2014, Sokolich-Beatson was named in the New Zealand Secondary Schools' Netball Team.

== Playing career ==
=== Northern Mystics ===
Sokolich-Beatson started playing for Northern Mystics in 2016. In 2019, she captained Mystics for the first time when then-captain Phoenix Karaka was ruled out of a match with an injury.Sokolich-Beatson missed the 2020 and 2021 ANZ Premiership seasons due to injury. Since 2024 she has been captain of Mystics. Sokolich-Beatson played her 100th match for Mystics in the 2024 Elimination final against the Mainland Tactix, which Mystics won 68 – 64. Sokolich-Beatson won premierships with the Mystics in 2023 and 2024.

=== International ===
==== New Zealand Under-21 ====
In 2018, she captained the New Zealand under-21 side to the Youth World Cup title in Botswana, where they beat Australia in the final.

==== Fast5 Ferns ====
Sokolich-Beatson first played for the Fast5 Ferns at the 2023 Fast5 Netball World Series, where New Zealand finished second. Sokolich-Beatson was also the captain. Sokolich-Beatson once-again captained the Fast5 Ferns at the 2024 Fast5 Netball World Series where New Zealand lost to Australia in the final for the second year in a row.

==== Silver Ferns ====
In 2018 was selected for the New Zealand national netball team, the Silver Ferns, to compete in the 2018 Commonwealth Games, where New Zealand finished fourth. She played 11 games for New Zealand in 2018 She was also selected in the Silver Ferns travelling squad for the 2019 Netball World Cup as a potential injury replacement for defender Katrina Rore.In January 2020, Sokolich-Beatson snapped her right achilles at a New Zealand training camp, and later that year snapped her left achilles at another training camp. In 2023, Sokolich-Beatson was recalled into the national team for the 2024 Netball Nations Cup, where she played in her first Silver Ferns match since October 2018 in a match against Uganda. As of July 2025 she has played 14 matches for the Silver Ferns.
