= Elisapeta Toeava =

New Zealand netball international

Personal information
- Born: 10 March 1994 (age 32) Samoa
- Height: 1.61 m (5 ft 3 in)

Netball career
- Playing positions: C, WA
| Years | Club team | Apps |
| 2013, 2017- | Northern Mystics | |
| Years | National team | Caps |
| 2018- | New Zealand | 3 (end of 2021) |

Elisapeta Toeava (born 1994) is a netball player who was born in Samoa and moved to New Zealand. A player for the Northern Mystics team in Auckland, as of the end of 2021 she had also played three matches for the New Zealand national netball team.

== Early life ==
Elisapeta Toeava, known as "Peta", was born in Samoa on 10 March 1994. She has nine sisters and two brothers, one of whom is the rugby union player, Isaia Toeava, who played 37 times for the All Blacks. Like her brother, Toeava moved to New Zealand, where she was brought up by her grandmother. She attended McAuley High School in Ōtāhuhu, a suburb of Auckland.

== Netball career ==
A member of the New Zealand Secondary Schools team, which beat Australia, Toeava was recruited by the Northern Mystics in 2013 while she was still at school and playing for the Carlton United team. After a successful first season, during which she played for the New Zealand Under-21 team, she decided to take a break from the Mystics, as she suffered from shyness. She returned to the team three years later in 2017 and was named the team’s most valuable player in 2018. Playing as a Centre (C) or Wing attack (WA), from 2019 she formed a successful partnership at the Mystics with Grace Nweke, the first woman of African descent to play for New Zealand. Toeava made her first appearance for the Silver Ferns, the New Zealand national team, in September 2018, against England, becoming the 170th woman to play for the team. When not playing netball, Toeava has worked part time at a south Auckland children’s day-care centre.
