= Phoenix Karaka =

New Zealand netball international

Personal information
- Born: 6 November 1993 (age 33) Auckland, New Zealand
- Height: 186 cm (6 ft 1 in)
- School: Auckland Girls' Grammar School

Netball career
- Playing positions: GK, GD
Years	Club team	Apps
2013–2015	Southern Steel	32
2016–2017	Central Pulse	
2018–	Northern Mystics	
Years	National team	Caps
2010–2011	NZ Secondary Schools	
2012–2013	NZ Under21	
2014–	New Zealand	70
Medal record
Representing New Zealand
Women's netball
Netball at the Commonwealth Games
Bronze medal – third place	2022 Birmingham	Team

Phoenix Karaka (born 6 November 1993) is a New Zealand netball international. She was a member of the New Zealand teams that won the 2019 Netball World Cup. Christine Papali'i is her mother.

== Career ==
Following her success at secondary school level at Auckland Girls' Grammar School, Karaka rose through the ranks at age group level as a part of both the NZ Secondary Schools and NZ Under-21 teams, including the victorious Under-21 side at the Youth World Cup in Glasgow in 2013.

Karaka signed her first professional contract with Southern Steel for the 2013 ANZ Championship, and remained a part of the Steel for the next three seasons before signing with the Central Pulse in 2016 after consistently impressive performances, including being ranked 3rd overall for intercepts in the 2015 ANZ Championship. She captained Northern Mystics in 2019 and 2020. but pulled out the following year due to pregnancy

== International ==
Karaka made her debut for New Zealand on their 2014 Tour of the UK where she was initially selected as a training partner, however was soon promoted to the main squad following injury concerns to Casey Kopua. She participated in the exhibition games against Scotland and England A, before making her test debut off as a substitute in the final stages of the Silver Fern's 17-goal victory over England on 20 January 2014. Karaka made a triumphant return after earning her spot in the 2019 Netball World Cup winning team. Karaka again returned following the birth of her daughter to the 2022 Netball Quad Series.

Karaka was named in the team of 12 for the 2022 Commonwealth Games.

== Personal life ==
Phoenix Karaka's partner is All Black Patrick Tuipulotu.
