= 2026 Suncorp Super Netball season =

- League: Suncorp Super Netball
- Sport: Netball
- Duration: 14 March 2026 – 4 July 2026
- Teams: 8
- TV partner: Fox Sports
- Streaming partner(s): Kayo Sports and BINGE

Regular season
- Minor premiers: Adelaide Thunderbirds
- Season MVP: Elmeré van der Berg
- Top scorer: Elmeré van der Berg (748 points)

Finals
- Champions: Adelaide Thunderbirds
- Runners-up: Melbourne Vixens
- Grand Final MVP: Latanya Wilson

Seasons
- ← 2025 2027 →

The 2026 Suncorp Super Netball season was the tenth season of the premier netball league in Australia. The season commenced on Saturday 14 March and concluded with the Grand Final on Saturday 4 July at John Cain Arena in Melbourne. The defending premiers were the Melbourne Vixens.

The Adelaide Thunderbirds won their third premiership in four years, defeating the Melbourne Vixens by 21 points in the Grand Final.

This would be the final season of Netball Australia's five-year broadcast deal with Fox Sports, Kayo Sports and BINGE, as a new deal was signed in April with the Nine Network, effective from 1 January 2027.

It would also be the final season under the Suncorp Super Netball name, as the Suncorp Group did not renew their sponsorship of Netball Australia and the league after their deal expired at the end of 2026.

== Team Lists ==
Team	Home Court(s)	Coach	Attack	Midcourt	Defence	Nominated Athlete
Adelaide Thunderbirds	Adelaide Entertainment Centre	Tania Obst	(South Africa) Elmeré van der Berg (Australia) Lauren Frew (Australia) Georgie Horjus (Australia) Kayla Graham	(Australia) Tayla Williams (New Zealand) Kate Heffernan (Australia) Sophie Casey	(Jamaica) Latanya Wilson (Australia) Matilda Garrett (Jamaica) Shamera Sterling-Humphrey	(Australia) Lucy Voyvodic
GIANTS Netball	Ken Rosewall Arena; Qudos Bank Arena	Nerida Stewart	(Australia) Lucy Austin (Australia) Matisse Letherbarrow (Australia) Sophie Dwyer	(New Zealand) Whitney Souness (Australia) Hope White (Australia) Casey Adamson (Australia) Amy Sligar	(Jamaica) Jodi-Ann Ward (Australia) Erin O'Brien (New Zealand) Jane Watson	(Australia) Skye Thompson
Melbourne Mavericks	John Cain Arena; Red Energy Arena	Gerard Murphy	(Jamaica) Shimona Nelson (Tonga) Uneeq Palavi (Australia) Reilley Batcheldor (Australia) Sacha McDonald	(Australia) Jamie-Lee Price (Australia) Amy Parmenter (Australia) Molly Jovic (Maternity Leave) (Australia) Maddie Hay (Replacement Player)	(Australia) Kim Brown (Australia) Jessie Grenvold (Australia) Tara Hinchliffe	(Australia) Charlotte Sexton
Melbourne Vixens	John Cain Arena	Di Honey	(Australia) Sophie Garbin (Australia) Kiera Austin (Australia) Lily Graham	(Australia) Hannah Mundy (Australia) Kate Moloney (Australia) Zara Walters	(Australia) Kate Eddy (Australia) Jo Weston (Australia) Emily Mannix (Australia) Rudi Ellis	(Australia) Maggie Caris
NSW Swifts	Ken Rosewall Arena; Qudos Bank Arena	Briony Akle	(New Zealand) Grace Nweke (England) Helen Housby (Australia) Grace Whyte	(Australia) Paige Hadley (Australia) Maddy Proud (Australia) Tayla Fraser (Australia) Sharni Lambden	(Australia) Maddy Turner (Australia) Sarah Klau (Australia) Teigan O'Shannassy	(Australia) Nicola Barge
Queensland Firebirds	Nissan Arena	Kiri Wills	(Uganda) Mary Cholhok (New Zealand) Te Paea Selby-Rickit (Australia) Emily Moore	(Australia) Lara Dunkley (England) Imogen Allison (New Zealand) Maddy Gordon (Australia) Macy Gardner	(Australia) Ruby Bakewell-Doran (Australia) Isabelle Shearer (New Zealand) Kelly Jackson	(Australia) Elsa Sif Sandholt
Sunshine Coast Lightning	UniSC Arena	Belinda Reynolds	(Australia) Donnell Wallam (Australia) Cara Koenen (Australia) Gabrielle Sinclair	(Australia) Liz Watson (Australia) Leesa Mi Mi (Australia) Mahalia Cassidy (Australia) Ava Black	(New Zealand) Karin Burger (Australia) Courtney Bruce (Australia) Ash Ervin	(Australia) Tippah Dwan
West Coast Fever	RAC Arena	Dan Ryan	(England) Sasha Glasgow (Australia) Olivia Wilkinson (Jamaica) Jhaniele Fowler-Nembhard (Maternity Leave) (Jamaica) Romelda Aiken-George (Replacement Player)	(Australia) Alice Teague-Neeld (Australia) Jordan Cransberg (Australia) Jess Anstiss (Australia) Zoe Cransberg (Replacement Player)	(England) Fran Williams (Australia) Ruth Aryang (Jamaica) Kadie-Ann Dehaney (Australia) Sunday Aryang (Injury Leave)	(Australia) Caitlyn Brown

== Contracted Signings ==
Important dates in relation to player signings for the 2026 season are:

- Until Saturday 19 July 2025: Current players can be re-signed by their 2025 team on a one-year contract.
- Monday 4 August 2025 to Friday 22 August 2025: Clubs can sign any free agent and non-SSN players on a one-year contract.
- From Monday 25 August 2025: Training Partners and Nominated Athletes can be signed on a one-year contract.

=== Arrivals ===
The following table is a list of players who moved clubs in/leagues into Super Netball, or were elevated to a permanent position during the off-season. It does not include players who were re-signed by their original Super Netball clubs.

Name	2025	2026	Ref
(Australia) Hope White	(Australia) GIANTS Netball (Replacement Player)	GIANTS Netball	
(Australia) Jamie-Lee Price	(Australia) GIANTS Netball	Melbourne Mavericks	
(Australia) Lucy Austin	(Australia) Adelaide Thunderbirds	GIANTS Netball	
(Australia) Reilley Batcheldor	(Australia) Sunshine Coast Lightning	Melbourne Mavericks	
(Australia) Sophie Casey	(Australia) Adelaide Thunderbirds (Nominated Athlete)	Adelaide Thunderbirds	
(Australia) Tara Hinchliffe	(Australia) Sunshine Coast Lightning	Melbourne Mavericks	
(England) Sasha Glasgow	(Australia) Melbourne Mavericks	West Coast Fever	
(New Zealand) Kelly Jackson	(New Zealand) Central Pulse (ANZ Premiership)	Queensland Firebirds	
(Australia) Donnell Wallam	(New Zealand) Northern Mystics (ANZ Premiership)	Sunshine Coast Lightning	
(South Africa) Elmeré van der Berg	(England) Manchester Thunder (Netball Super League)	Adelaide Thunderbirds	
(Australia) Tayla Fraser	(Australia) Melbourne Mavericks	NSW Swifts	
(Australia) Casey Adamson	(Australia) Boroondara Express (Victorian Netball League)	GIANTS Netball	
(New Zealand) Maddy Gordon	(New Zealand) Central Pulse (ANZ Premiership)	Queensland Firebirds	
(New Zealand) Kate Heffernan	(New Zealand) Southern Steel (ANZ Premiership)	Adelaide Thunderbirds	
(Australia) Jessie Grenvold	(Australia) Melbourne Mavericks (Nominated Athlete)	Melbourne Mavericks	
(New Zealand) Te Paea Selby-Rickit	(New Zealand) Mainland Tactix (ANZ Premiership)	Queensland Firebirds	
(New Zealand) Jane Watson	(New Zealand) Mainland Tactix (ANZ Premiership)	GIANTS Netball	
(Tonga) Uneeq Palavi	(Australia) Melbourne Mavericks (Replacement Player)	Melbourne Mavericks	
(New Zealand) Karin Burger	(New Zealand) Mainland Tactix (ANZ Premiership)	Sunshine Coast Lightning	
(Australia) Grace Whyte	(Australia) NSW Swifts (Nominated Athlete)	NSW Swifts	
(New Zealand) Whitney Souness	(New Zealand) Central Pulse (ANZ Premiership)	GIANTS Netball	
(Australia) Gabrielle Sinclair	(England) Birmingham Panthers (Netball Super League)	Sunshine Coast Lightning	
(Australia) Sacha McDonald	(Australia) Casey Demons (Victorian Netball League)	Melbourne Mavericks	

=== Departures ===
The following table is a list of players who were contracted in the 2025 season, but were not signed by any Super Netball club. This includes players that retired at the end of the previous season.

Name	2025	2026	Ref
(England) Jo Harten	GIANTS Netball	Retirement	
(Australia) Hannah Petty	Adelaide Thunderbirds	Retirement	
(England) Eleanor Cardwell	Melbourne Mavericks	(England) AO Manchester Thunder (Netball Super League)	
(Jamaica) Romelda Aiken-George	Adelaide Thunderbirds	(Australia) West Coast Fever (Replacement Player)	
(Australia) Olivia Lewis	Melbourne Mavericks	(Australia) Collingwood Magpies (AFLW)	
(Australia) Tippah Dwan	Queensland Firebirds	(Australia) Sunshine Coast Lightning (Nominated Athlete)	
(Tonga) Hulita Veve	Queensland Firebirds	Unattached	
(Australia) Ashlee Barnett	Queensland Firebirds	(New Zealand) Mainland Tactix (ANZ Premiership)	
(Jamaica) Shanice Beckford	West Coast Fever	Unattached	
(Australia) Sophie Fawns	NSW Swifts	(England) AO Manchester Thunder (Netball Super League)	
(Australia) Lauren Parkinson	Melbourne Mavericks	Unattached	
(Australia) Allie Smith	NSW Swifts	Unattached	
(New Zealand) Gina Crampton	GIANTS Netball (Maternity Leave)	(Australia) NSW Swifts (Replacement Player)	
(Australia) Steph Fretwell	Sunshine Coast Lightning	Retirement	
(Australia) Maddie Hay	GIANTS Netball	(Australia) Melbourne Mavericks (Replacement Player)	
(Australia) Matilda McDonell	GIANTS Netball	(Australia) GIANTS Netball (Replacement Player)	
(Australia) Maisie Nankivell	Melbourne Mavericks	(Australia) Collingwood Magpies (AFLW)	

== Pre-season matches ==
Riverina Road Trip

Friday 30 January	GIANTS Netball	55 – 51	Queensland Firebirds	Wagga Wagga Multi-Purpose Stadium
7:00pm AEDT				Umpires: Shauna Winchester, Tamara Buriani-Gennai

Sunday 1 February	GIANTS Netball	60 – 63	Queensland Firebirds	Griffith Regional Sports Centre
11:00am AEDT

MSAC Series

Saturday 7 February	Melbourne Mavericks	41 – 66	Victoria Open Men	Melbourne Sports and Aquatic Centre
6:30pm AEDT

Wednesday 18 February	Melbourne Mavericks	64 – 57	West Coast Fever	Melbourne Sports and Aquatic Centre
6:00pm AEDT		Report

Suncorp Spirit Cup

Friday 20 February	Melbourne Mavericks	71 – 50	GIANTS Netball	Gold Coast Sports and Leisure Centre
5:00pm AEST				Umpires: Jordan Kiss, Bronwen Adams

Friday 20 February	Queensland Firebirds	55 – 63	Sunshine Coast Lightning	Gold Coast Sports and Leisure Centre
7:00pm AEST		Report		Umpires: Shauna Winchester, Tamara Buriani-Gennai

Ballarat Blitz

Saturday 21 February	NSW Swifts	59 – 64	Adelaide Thunderbirds	Selkirk Stadium
3:00pm AEDT				Umpires: Tim Marshall, Taylah Bennett

Saturday 21 February	Melbourne Vixens	61 – 53	West Coast Fever	Selkirk Stadium
5:15pm AEDT		Report		Umpires: Nicole Wingrave, Justin Barnes

Sunday 22 February	West Coast Fever	64 – 61	NSW Swifts	Selkirk Stadium
11:00am AEDT		Report		Umpires: Nicole Wingrave, Tim Marshall

Sunday 22 February	Melbourne Vixens	59 – 64	Adelaide Thunderbirds	Selkirk Stadium
1:15pm AEDT		Report		Umpires: Justin Barnes, Taylah Bennett

Lightning v GIANTS

Sunday 22 February	Sunshine Coast Lightning	72 – 51	GIANTS Netball	UniSC Arena
12:00pm AEST

Firebirds v Mystics

Thursday 26 February	Queensland Firebirds	51 – 51	GoSweetSpot Mystics	Nissan Arena
6:00pm AEST		Report		Umpires: Jess Lakeman, Claire Kleinschmidt

Fever v Thunderbirds

Friday 27 February	West Coast Fever	61 – 70	Adelaide Thunderbirds	Evolution Mining Stadium
6:00pm AWST				Umpires: Tahlia Halden, Nicole Robson

Saturday 28 February	West Coast Fever	58 – 72	Adelaide Thunderbirds	Perth HPC
6:00pm AWST		Report		Umpires: Jess McKemmish, Tahlia Halden (1st half) and Nicole Robson (2nd half)

Thunderbirds v Firebirds

Wednesday 4 March	Adelaide Thunderbirds	64 – 49	Queensland Firebirds	Adelaide 36ers Arena
5:00pm ACDT

Thursday 5 March	Adelaide Thunderbirds	56 – 61	Queensland Firebirds	Adelaide 36ers Arena
5:00pm ACDT

Bound 4 Bendigo

Thursday 5 March	Melbourne Vixens	69 – 63	Melbourne Mavericks	Red Energy Arena
7:00pm AEDT		Report		Umpires: Nicole Wingrave, Taylah Bennett

Show Court Showdown

Thursday 5 March	NSW Swifts	63 – 54	GIANTS Netball	Netball Central
7:00pm AEDT		Report

== Regular season ==
- Source: Click here (all times are in local time)

=== Round 1 ===
Saturday 14 March	Melbourne Mavericks	61 – 52	GIANTS Netball	Red Energy Arena
5:00pm AEDT	2 Goal Shots; Uneeq Palavi 5/8 (63%); Reilley Batcheldor 2/3 (67%); Shimona Nelson 1/1 (100%); 1 Goal Shots; Shimona Nelson 26/29 (90%); Reilley Batcheldor 13/14 (93%); Uneeq Palavi 6/7 (86%)	Report; Stats	2 Goal Shots; Matisse Letherbarrow 6/9 (67%); Sophie Dwyer 2/3 (67%); 1 Goal Shots; Lucy Austin 15/21 (71%); Matisse Letherbarrow 11/12 (92%); Sophie Dwyer 10/10 (100%)	Umpires: Justin Barnes, Tim Marshall

Saturday 14 March	Adelaide Thunderbirds	74 – 54	NSW Swifts	Adelaide Entertainment Centre
6:30pm ACDT	2 Goal Shots; Georgie Horjus 1/1 (100%); Elmeré van der Berg 0/1 (0%); Kayla Graham 0/2 (0%); 1 Goal Shots; Elmeré van der Berg 59/61 (97%); Georgie Horjus 6/6 (100%); Lauren Frew 4/4 (100%); Kayla Graham 3/3 (100%)	Report; Stats	2 Goal Shots; Grace Nweke 2/3 (67%); Helen Housby 1/6 (17%); 1 Goal Shots; Grace Nweke 38/40 (95%); Helen Housby 7/10 (70%); Grace Whyte 3/3 (100%)	Umpires: Jemma Cook, Rachael Stebbings

Sunday 15 March	Queensland Firebirds	49 – 60	Melbourne Vixens	Nissan Arena
1:00pm AEST	2 Goal Shots; Emily Moore 4/9 (44%); Mary Cholhok 1/1 (100%); Te Paea Selby-Rickit 0/4 (0%); 1 Goal Shots; Mary Cholhok 33/42 (79%); Te Paea Selby-Rickit 5/6 (83%); Emily Moore 1/1 (100%)	Report; Stats	2 Goal Shots; Kiera Austin 3/4 (75%); Sophie Garbin 0/1 (0%); 1 Goal Shots; Sophie Garbin 30/34 (88%); Kiera Austin 24/25 (96%)	Umpires: Bronwen Adams, Jordan Kiss

Sunday 15 March	West Coast Fever	68 – 65	Sunshine Coast Lightning	RAC Arena
1:00pm AWST	2 Goal Shots; Sasha Glasgow 5/7 (71%); 1 Goal Shots; Romelda Aiken-George 53/62 (85%); Sasha Glasgow 5/6 (83%)	Report; Stats	2 Goal Shots; Donnell Wallam 5/13 (38%); Cara Koenen 2/4 (50%); 1 Goal Shots; Donnell Wallam 43/49 (88%); Cara Koenen 8/8 (100%)	Umpires: Georgina Sulley-Beales, Nicole Wingrave

=== Round 2 ===
Saturday 21 March	Sunshine Coast Lightning	63 – 62	Queensland Firebirds	UniSC Arena
4:00pm AEST	2 Goal Shots; Donnell Wallam 2/5 (40%); Cara Koenen 1/3 (33%); 1 Goal Shots; Donnell Wallam 46/58 (79%); Cara Koenen 11/11 (100%)	Report; Stats	2 Goal Shots; Mary Cholhok 0/1 (0%); 1 Goal Shots; Mary Cholhok 48/67 (72%); Te Paea Selby-Rickit 13/17 (76%); Emily Moore 1/1 (100%)	Umpires: Taylah Bennett, Jemma Cook

Saturday 21 March	Adelaide Thunderbirds	66 – 53	West Coast Fever	Adelaide Entertainment Centre
6:30pm ACDT	2 Goal Shots; Elmeré van der Berg 1/1 (100%); Lauren Frew 0/2 (0%); 1 Goal Shots; Elmeré van der Berg 57/62 (92%); Kayla Graham 4/5 (80%); Lauren Frew 2/2 (100%); Georgie Horjus 1/1 (100%)	Report; Stats	2 Goal Shots; Sasha Glasgow 6/10 (60%); Sloan Burton 1/3 (33%); Romelda Aiken-George 0/1 (0%); 1 Goal Shots; Romelda Aiken-George 29/37 (78%); Sasha Glasgow 10/11 (91%)	Umpires: Justin Barnes, Tamara Buriani-Gennai

Sunday 22 March	GIANTS Netball	52 – 68	Melbourne Vixens	Qudos Bank Arena
3:00pm AEDT	2 Goal Shots; Matisse Letherbarrow 4/7 (57%); Lucy Austin 1/2 (50%); Sophie Dwyer 1/3 (33%); 1 Goal Shots; Lucy Austin 18/24 (75%); Matisse Letherbarrow 14/15 (93%); Sophie Dwyer 8/8 (100%)	Report; Stats	2 Goal Shots; Kiera Austin 4/4 (100%); Lily Graham 1/1 (100%); 1 Goal Shots; Sophie Garbin 42/48 (88%); Kiera Austin 14/17 (82%); Lily Graham 2/3 (67%)	Attendance: 13,462; Umpires: Shauna Winchester, Claire Kleinschmidt

Sunday 22 March	NSW Swifts	70 – 69	Melbourne Mavericks	Qudos Bank Arena
5:00pm AEDT	2 Goal Shots; Helen Housby 4/9 (44%); Grace Nweke 3/4 (75%); 1 Goal Shots; Grace Nweke 44/47 (94%); Helen Housby 12/13 (92%)	Report; Stats	2 Goal Shots; Uneeq Palavi 3/3 (100%); Reilley Batcheldor 1/4 (25%); Shimona Nelson 0/1 (0%); 1 Goal Shots; Shimona Nelson 54/56 (96%); Reilley Batcheldor 6/8 (75%); Uneeq Palavi 1/1 (100%)	Attendance: 13,462; Umpires: Sarah McNamara, Jordan Kiss

=== Round 3 ===
Saturday 28 March	Melbourne Mavericks	71 – 72 (ET)	Melbourne Vixens	John Cain Arena
5:00pm AEDT	2 Goal Shots; Uneeq Palavi 3/5 (60%); Shimona Nelson 1/2 (50%); Reilley Batcheldor 0/1 (0%); Sacha McDonald 0/2 (0%); 1 Goal Shots; Shimona Nelson 54/56 (96%); Reilley Batcheldor 5/7 (71%); Sacha McDonald 3/3 (100%); Uneeq Palavi 1/1 (100%)	Report; Stats	2 Goal Shots; Kiera Austin 5/8 (63%); 1 Goal Shots; Sophie Garbin 47/52 (90%); Kiera Austin 15/20 (75%)	Attendance: 8,463; Umpires: Jemma Cook, Georgina Sulley-Beales

Saturday 28 March	Sunshine Coast Lightning	66 – 65	NSW Swifts	UniSC Arena
6:00pm AEST	2 Goal Shots; Donnell Wallam 0/2 (0%); Cara Koenen 0/2 (0%); 1 Goal Shots; Donnell Wallam 54/63 (86%); Cara Koenen 12/14 (86%)	Report; Stats	2 Goal Shots; Helen Housby 3/7 (43%); Grace Whyte 2/2 (100%); Grace Nweke 0/1 (0%); 1 Goal Shots; Grace Nweke 50/55 (91%); Helen Housby 5/5 (100%)	Umpires: Rachael Stebbings, Bronwen Adams

Sunday 29 March	Queensland Firebirds	46 – 73	Adelaide Thunderbirds	Nissan Arena
1:00pm AEST	2 Goal Shots; Elsa Sif Sandholt 6/7 (86%); Te Paea Selby-Rickit 1/6 (17%); Emily Moore 0/2 (0%); 1 Goal Shots; Elsa Sif Sandholt 18/19 (95%); Te Paea Selby-Rickit 7/12 (58%); Mary Cholhok 5/6 (83%); Emily Moore 2/2 (100%)	Report; Stats	2 Goal Shots; Elmeré van der Berg 4/6 (67%); 1 Goal Shots; Elmeré van der Berg 44/53 (83%); Lauren Frew 12/12 (100%); Georgie Horjus 5/6 (83%); Kayla Graham 4/4 (100%)	Umpires: Tim Marshall, Nicole Wingrave

Sunday 29 March	West Coast Fever	69 – 50	GIANTS Netball	RAC Arena
1:00pm AWST	2 Goal Shots; Sasha Glasgow 4/7 (57%); Romelda Aiken-George 0/1 (0%); 1 Goal Shots; Romelda Aiken-George 53/61 (87%); Sasha Glasgow 8/10 (80%)	Report; Stats	2 Goal Shots; Matisse Letherbarrow 6/10 (60%); Sophie Dwyer 1/2 (50%); 1 Goal Shots; Matisse Letherbarrow 18/19 (95%); Sophie Dwyer 11/13 (85%); Lucy Austin 7/9 (78%)	Umpires: Taylah Bennett, Tahlia Halden

=== Round 4 ===
Saturday 4 April	GIANTS Netball	55 – 78	Queensland Firebirds	Ken Rosewall Arena
5:00pm AEDT	2 Goal Shots; Matisse Letherbarrow 4/5 (80%); Sophie Dwyer 3/4 (75%); 1 Goal Shots; Matisse Letherbarrow 19/20 (95%); Sophie Dwyer 17/18 (94%); Lucy Austin 5/9 (56%)	Report; Stats	2 Goal Shots; Elsa Sif Sandholt 0/1 (0%); 1 Goal Shots; Mary Cholhok 62/80 (78%); Te Paea Selby-Rickit 10/12 (83%); Emily Moore 4/5 (80%); Elsa Sif Sandholt 2/2 (100%)	Umpires: Bronwen Adams, Shauna Winchester

Saturday 4 April	Melbourne Mavericks	48 – 55	Adelaide Thunderbirds	John Cain Arena
7:00pm AEDT	2 Goal Shots; Reilley Batcheldor 6/10 (60%); Uneeq Palavi 4/8 (50%); 1 Goal Shots; Shimona Nelson 13/15 (87%); Reilley Batcheldor 9/13 (69%); Uneeq Palavi 6/7 (86%)	Report; Stats	2 Goal Shots; Elmeré van der Berg 3/3 (100%); 1 Goal Shots; Elmeré van der Berg 38/42 (90%); Georgie Horjus 10/11 (91%); Lauren Frew 1/1 (100%)	Umpires: Justin Barnes, Rachael Stebbings

Sunday 5 April	NSW Swifts	57 – 77	West Coast Fever	Ken Rosewall Arena
2:00pm AEST	2 Goal Shots; Helen Housby 4/7 (57%); Grace Whyte 0/1 (0%); Nicola Barge 0/1 (0%); Grace Nweke 0/3 (0%); 1 Goal Shots; Grace Nweke 43/53 (81%); Helen Housby 5/7 (71%); Grace Whyte 1/1 (100%)	Report; Stats	2 Goal Shots; Sasha Glasgow 1/6 (17%); 1 Goal Shots; Romelda Aiken-George 67/76 (88%); Sasha Glasgow 8/8 (100%)	Umpires: Georgina Sulley-Beales, Tayla Favell

Sunday 5 April	Melbourne Vixens	70 – 59	Sunshine Coast Lightning	John Cain Arena
4:00pm AEST	2 Goal Shots; Kiera Austin 7/8 (88%); 1 Goal Shots; Sophie Garbin 36/37 (97%); Kiera Austin 20/26 (77%)	Report; Stats	2 Goal Shots; Donnell Wallam 2/9 (22%); Gabrielle Sinclair 0/1 (0%); 1 Goal Shots; Donnell Wallam 44/50 (88%); Cara Koenen 11/13 (85%)	Umpires: Tamara Buriani-Gennai, Jordan Kiss

=== Round 5 ===
Saturday 11 April	NSW Swifts	59 – 66	Melbourne Vixens	Ken Rosewall Arena
5:00pm AEST	2 Goal Shots; Grace Whyte 3/7 (43%); 1 Goal Shots; Grace Nweke 49/52 (94%); Grace Whyte 4/8 (50%)	Report; Stats	2 Goal Shots; Kiera Austin 5/8 (63%); 1 Goal Shots; Sophie Garbin 47/52 (90%); Kiera Austin 9/12 (75%)	Umpires: Jemma Cook, Tamara Buriani-Gennai

Saturday 11 April	Adelaide Thunderbirds	56 – 54	GIANTS Netball	Adelaide Entertainment Centre
6:30pm ACST	2 Goal Shots; Georgie Horjus 4/4 (100%); Elmeré van der Berg 1/3 (33%); Lauren Frew 0/1 (0%); 1 Goal Shots; Elmeré van der Berg 32/36 (89%); Georgie Horjus 6/6 (100%); Kayla Graham 5/7 (71%); Lauren Frew 3/3 (100%)	Report; Stats	2 Goal Shots; Matisse Letherbarrow 2/4 (50%); Sophie Dwyer 1/2 (50%); 1 Goal Shots; Matisse Letherbarrow 29/29 (100%); Sophie Dwyer 19/19 (100%)	Umpires: Georgina Sulley-Beales, Taylah Bennett

Sunday 12 April	Sunshine Coast Lightning	53 – 62	Melbourne Mavericks	UniSC Arena
2:00pm AEST	2 Goal Shots; Donnell Wallam 2/4 (50%); Gabrielle Sinclair 1/1 (100%); Cara Koenen 1/4 (25%); 1 Goal Shots; Donnell Wallam 30/35 (86%); Cara Koenen 14/14 (100%); Gabrielle Sinclair 1/2 (50%)	Report; Stats	2 Goal Shots; Uneeq Palavi 0/1 (0%); Reilley Batcheldor 0/2 (0%); 1 Goal Shots; Shimona Nelson 56/61 (92%); Reilley Batcheldor 5/6 (83%); Sacha McDonald 1/2 (50%)	Umpires: Bronwen Adams, Nicole Wingrave

Sunday 12 April	West Coast Fever	58 – 54	Queensland Firebirds	RAC Arena
2:00pm AWST	2 Goal Shots; Olivia Wilkinson 4/6 (67%); Sasha Glasgow 1/3 (33%); 1 Goal Shots; Romelda Aiken-George 34/46 (74%); Olivia Wilkinson 10/14 (71%); Sasha Glasgow 4/5 (80%)	Report; Stats	2 Goal Shots; Te Paea Selby-Rickit 2/4 (50%); Elsa Sif Sandholt 1/2 (50%); 1 Goal Shots; Mary Cholhok 33/51 (65%); Elsa Sif Sandholt 7/7 (100%); Te Paea Selby-Rickit 7/8 (88%); Emily Moore 1/2 (50%)	Umpires: Rachael Stebbings, Tim Marshall

=== Round 6 ===
Saturday 18 April	Queensland Firebirds	77 – 66	NSW Swifts	Nissan Arena
5:00pm AEST	2 Goal Shots; Te Paea Selby-Rickit 3/4 (75%); 1 Goal Shots; Mary Cholhok 63/66 (95%); Te Paea Selby-Rickit 6/6 (100%); Emily Moore 2/2 (100%)	Report; Stats	2 Goal Shots; Grace Whyte 3/6 (50%); Grace Nweke 0/2 (0%); 1 Goal Shots; Grace Nweke 53/56 (95%); Grace Whyte 7/9 (78%)	Umpires: Rachael Stebbings, Taylah Bennett

Saturday 18 April	Melbourne Vixens	56 – 50	Adelaide Thunderbirds	John Cain Arena
7:00pm AEST	2 Goal Shots; Kiera Austin 4/4 (100%); Sophie Garbin 1/2 (50%); 1 Goal Shots; Sophie Garbin 24/28 (86%); Kiera Austin 22/25 (88%)	Report; Stats	2 Goal Shots; Elmeré van der Berg 1/4 (25%); Georgie Horjus 0/1 (0%); Lauren Frew 0/2 (0%); 1 Goal Shots; Elmeré van der Berg 42/46 (91%); Lauren Frew 4/5 (80%); Georgie Horjus 2/2 (100%)	Umpires: Jemma Cook, Jordan Kiss

Sunday 19 April	Melbourne Mavericks	47 – 59	West Coast Fever	John Cain Arena
2:00pm AEST	2 Goal Shots; Uneeq Palavi 2/4 (50%); Reilley Batcheldor 2/5 (40%); Sacha McDonald 1/1 (100%); Shimona Nelson 0/1 (0%); 1 Goal Shots; Shimona Nelson 20/21 (95%); Sacha McDonald 8/8 (100%); Uneeq Palavi 8/10 (80%); Reilley Batcheldor 1/2 (50%)	Report; Stats	2 Goal Shots; Sasha Glasgow 2/3 (67%); 1 Goal Shots; Romelda Aiken-George 50/57 (88%); Sasha Glasgow 5/7 (71%)	Umpires: Nicole Wingrave, Justin Barnes

Sunday 19 April	GIANTS Netball	51 – 59	Sunshine Coast Lightning	Ken Rosewall Arena
4:00pm AEST	2 Goal Shots; Matisse Letherbarrow 2/4 (50%); Sophie Dwyer 0/2 (0%); 1 Goal Shots; Matisse Letherbarrow 31/34 (91%); Sophie Dwyer 16/17 (94%)	Report; Stats	2 Goal Shots; Donnell Wallam 0/1 (0%); Gabrielle Sinclair 0/1 (0%); 1 Goal Shots; Donnell Wallam 52/54 (96%); Cara Koenen 7/8 (88%)	Umpires: Tim Marshall, Tayla Favell

=== Round 7 ===
Saturday 25 April	NSW Swifts	72 – 59	GIANTS Netball	Ken Rosewall Arena
5:00pm AEST	2 Goal Shots; Grace Whyte 1/1 (100%); Nicola Barge 0/1 (0%); 1 Goal Shots; Grace Nweke 61/69 (88%); Grace Whyte 5/5 (100%); Nicola Barge 4/5 (80%)	Report; Stats	2 Goal Shots; Sophie Dwyer 10/14 (71%); Matisse Letherbarrow 2/7 (29%); 1 Goal Shots; Sophie Dwyer 22/22 (100%); Matisse Letherbarrow 10/10 (100%); Skye Thompson 3/3 (100%)	Attendance: 8,214; Umpires: Tayla Favell, Shauna Winchester

Saturday 25 April	Adelaide Thunderbirds	61 – 60	Sunshine Coast Lightning	Adelaide Entertainment Centre
6:30pm ACST	1 Goal Shots; Elmeré van der Berg 57/61 (93%); Georgie Horjus 3/3 (100%); Lauren Frew 1/1 (100%)	Report; Stats	2 Goal Shots; Donnell Wallam 3/4 (75%); 1 Goal Shots; Donnell Wallam 47/53 (89%); Cara Koenen 7/9 (78%)	Umpires: Justin Barnes, Jemma Cook

Sunday 26 April	Queensland Firebirds	57 – 58	Melbourne Mavericks	Nissan Arena
2:00pm AEST	2 Goal Shots; Mary Cholhok 1/1 (100%); Te Paea Selby-Rickit 0/1 (0%); 1 Goal Shots; Mary Cholhok 40/49 (82%); Te Paea Selby-Rickit 12/12 (100%); Emily Moore 3/4 (75%)	Report; Stats	2 Goal Shots; Reilley Batcheldor 1/2 (50%); Shimona Nelson 0/1 (0%); 1 Goal Shots; Shimona Nelson 45/49 (92%); Reilley Batcheldor 11/12 (92%)	Umpires: Tamara Buriani-Gennai, Georgina Sulley-Beales

Sunday 26 April	West Coast Fever	44 – 50	Melbourne Vixens	RAC Arena
2:00pm AWST	2 Goal Shots; Sasha Glasgow 4/13 (31%); Olivia Wilkinson 2/6 (33%); 1 Goal Shots; Romelda Aiken-George 21/25 (84%); Sasha Glasgow 7/12 (58%); Olivia Wilkinson 4/5 (80%)	Report; Stats	2 Goal Shots; Kiera Austin 0/1 (0%); 1 Goal Shots; Sophie Garbin 38/42 (90%); Kiera Austin 12/19 (63%)	Attendance: 10,004; Umpires: Bronwen Adams, Jordan Kiss

=== Round 8 ===
Saturday 2 May	Melbourne Mavericks	62 – 60	NSW Swifts	John Cain Arena
5:00pm AEST	1 Goal Shots; Shimona Nelson 57/60 (95%); Reilley Batcheldor 5/6 (83%)	Report; Stats	2 Goal Shots; Grace Whyte 4/4 (100%); 1 Goal Shots; Grace Nweke 44/49 (90%); Grace Whyte 8/8 (100%)	Umpires: Bronwen Adams, Jemma Cook

Saturday 2 May	Adelaide Thunderbirds	73 – 49	Queensland Firebirds	Adelaide Entertainment Centre
6:30pm ACST	2 Goal Shots; Elmeré van der Berg 4/7 (57%); Kayla Graham 1/1 (100%); 1 Goal Shots; Elmeré van der Berg 47/48 (98%); Georgie Horjus 8/10 (80%); Lauren Frew 6/6 (100%); Kayla Graham 2/3 (67%)	Report; Stats	2 Goal Shots; Te Paea Selby-Rickit 3/5 (60%); Emily Moore 2/5 (40%); Mary Cholhok 0/2 (0%); 1 Goal Shots; Mary Cholhok 25/30 (83%); Te Paea Selby-Rickit 13/14 (93%); Emily Moore 1/3 (33%)	Umpires: Tayla Favell, Tim Marshall

Sunday 3 May	Sunshine Coast Lightning	54 – 58	West Coast Fever	UniSC Arena
2:00pm AEST	2 Goal Shots; Donnell Wallam 3/7 (43%); Cara Koenen 0/1 (0%); Gabrielle Sinclair 0/1 (0%); 1 Goal Shots; Donnell Wallam 41/45 (91%); Cara Koenen 7/8 (88%)	Report; Stats	2 Goal Shots; Sasha Glasgow 2/4 (50%); 1 Goal Shots; Romelda Aiken-George 51/61 (84%); Sasha Glasgow 3/4 (75%)	Umpires: Claire Kleinschmidt, Tamara Buriani-Gennai

Sunday 3 May	Melbourne Vixens	66 – 64	GIANTS Netball	John Cain Arena
4:00pm AEST	2 Goal Shots; Kiera Austin 2/4 (50%); Sophie Garbin 0/1 (0%); 1 Goal Shots; Sophie Garbin 45/47 (96%); Kiera Austin 15/18 (83%); Lily Graham 2/3 (67%)	Report; Stats	2 Goal Shots; Matisse Letherbarrow 6/9 (67%); Sophie Dwyer 5/6 (83%); 1 Goal Shots; Matisse Letherbarrow 32/35 (91%); Sophie Dwyer 10/10 (100%)	Umpires: Sarah McNamara, Taylah Bennett

=== Round 9 ===
Friday 8 May	West Coast Fever	45 – 65	Adelaide Thunderbirds	RAC Arena
6:00pm AWST	2 Goal Shots; Romelda Aiken-George 3/4 (75%); Olivia Wilkinson 0/1 (0%); Sasha Glasgow 0/2 (0%); 1 Goal Shots; Romelda Aiken-George 31/40 (78%); Sasha Glasgow 6/7 (86%); Olivia Wilkinson 2/4 (50%)	Report; Stats	2 Goal Shots; Elmeré van der Berg 1/1 (100%); Lauren Frew 0/1 (0%); Kayla Graham 0/1 (0%); 1 Goal Shots; Elmeré van der Berg 57/61 (93%); Lauren Frew 4/5 (80%); Kayla Graham 1/1 (100%); Georgie Horjus 1/2 (50%)	Umpires: Jemma Cook, Tamara Buriani-Gennai

Saturday 9 May	NSW Swifts	70 – 56	Sunshine Coast Lightning	Ken Rosewall Arena
5:00pm AEST	2 Goal Shots; Grace Whyte 3/4 (75%); 1 Goal Shots; Grace Nweke 61/65 (94%); Grace Whyte 3/4 (75%)	Report; Stats	2 Goal Shots; Tippah Dwan 0/2 (0%); Donnell Wallam 0/4 (0%); 1 Goal Shots; Donnell Wallam 51/52 (98%); Cara Koenen 5/5 (100%)	Umpires: Jordan Kiss, Georgina Sulley-Beales

Sunday 10 May	GIANTS Netball	41 – 60	Melbourne Mavericks	Ken Rosewall Arena
2:00pm AEST	2 Goal Shots; Sophie Dwyer 3/9 (33%); Matisse Letherbarrow 2/5 (40%); 1 Goal Shots; Sophie Dwyer 20/21 (95%); Matisse Letherbarrow 7/11 (64%); Skye Thompson 4/6 (67%)	Report; Stats	2 Goal Shots; Uneeq Palavi 0/1 (0%); Reilley Batcheldor 0/2 (0%); 1 Goal Shots; Shimona Nelson 38/41 (93%); Uneeq Palavi 9/9 (100%); Reilley Batcheldor 7/8 (88%); Sacha McDonald 6/7 (86%)	Umpires: Rachael Stebbings, Bronwen Adams

Sunday 10 May	Melbourne Vixens	71 – 48	Queensland Firebirds	John Cain Arena
4:00pm AEST	2 Goal Shots; Kiera Austin 4/5 (80%); 1 Goal Shots; Sophie Garbin 44/48 (92%); Kiera Austin 17/19 (89%); Lily Graham 2/3 (67%)	Report; Stats	2 Goal Shots; Te Paea Selby-Rickit 4/9 (44%); Mary Cholhok 0/3 (0%); 1 Goal Shots; Mary Cholhok 26/29 (90%); Te Paea Selby-Rickit 14/17 (82%)	Umpires: Shauna Winchester, Justin Barnes

=== Round 10 ===
Saturday 16 May	Sunshine Coast Lightning	66 – 56	Melbourne Vixens	UniSC Arena
5:00pm AEST	2 Goal Shots; Donnell Wallam 1/1 (100%); 1 Goal Shots; Donnell Wallam 53/59 (90%); Cara Koenen 11/15 (73%)	Report; Stats	2 Goal Shots; Kiera Austin 6/11 (55%); Lily Graham 5/9 (56%); 1 Goal Shots; Sophie Garbin 18/20 (90%); Kiera Austin 15/19 (79%); Lily Graham 1/1 (100%)	Umpires: Rachael Stebbings, Taylah Bennett

Saturday 16 May	Queensland Firebirds	71 – 64	GIANTS Netball	Nissan Arena
7:00pm AEST	2 Goal Shots; Te Paea Selby-Rickit 4/6 (67%); Elsa Sif Sandholt 1/1 (100%); Mary Cholhok 0/1 (0%); 1 Goal Shots; Mary Cholhok 34/40 (85%); Te Paea Selby-Rickit 14/16 (88%); Elsa Sif Sandholt 13/13 (100%)	Report; Stats	2 Goal Shots; Sophie Dwyer 6/6 (100%); Matisse Letherbarrow 6/11 (55%); 1 Goal Shots; Matisse Letherbarrow 21/22 (95%); Sophie Dwyer 19/20 (95%)	Umpires: Georgina Sulley-Beales, Justin Barnes

Sunday 17 May	West Coast Fever	57 – 63	NSW Swifts	RAC Arena
12:00pm AWST	2 Goal Shots; Sasha Glasgow 2/5 (40%); Olivia Wilkinson 0/1 (0%); Romelda Aiken-George 0/2 (0%); 1 Goal Shots; Romelda Aiken-George 49/51 (96%); Sasha Glasgow 2/2 (100%); Olivia Wilkinson 2/2 (100%)	Report; Stats	2 Goal Shots; Grace Whyte 2/4 (50%); 1 Goal Shots; Grace Nweke 53/55 (96%); Grace Whyte 4/5 (80%); Nicola Barge 2/2 (100%)	Umpires: Jordan Kiss, Tim Marshall

Sunday 17 May	Adelaide Thunderbirds	55 – 51	Melbourne Mavericks	Adelaide Entertainment Centre
3:30pm ACST	1 Goal Shots; Elmeré van der Berg 47/49 (96%); Georgie Horjus 4/4 (100%); Kayla Graham 3/4 (75%); Lauren Frew 1/2 (50%)	Report; Stats	2 Goal Shots; Uneeq Palavi 4/4 (100%); Shimona Nelson 1/3 (33%); Reilley Batcheldor 1/3 (33%); Sacha McDonald 0/2 (0%); 1 Goal Shots; Shimona Nelson 22/23 (96%); Uneeq Palavi 7/7 (100%); Sacha McDonald 6/7 (86%); Reilley Batcheldor 4/6 (67%)	Umpires: Tamara Buriani-Gennai, Tayla Favell

=== Round 11: First Nations Round (Week 1) ===
Saturday 23 May	GIANTS Netball	37 – 70	Tarntanya Karntu	Ken Rosewall Arena
5:00pm AEST	2 Goal Shots; Sophie Dwyer 2/4 (50%); Skye Thompson 1/1 (100%); Matisse Letherbarrow 1/7 (14%); 1 Goal Shots; Sophie Dwyer 16/17 (94%); Matisse Letherbarrow 8/9 (89%); Skye Thompson 5/5 (100%)	Report; Stats	2 Goal Shots; Kayla Graham 0/2 (0%); Elmeré van der Berg 0/3 (0%); 1 Goal Shots; Elmeré van der Berg 56/61 (92%); Kayla Graham 6/6 (100%); Georgie Horjus 6/7 (86%); Lauren Frew 2/3 (67%)	Umpires: Shauna Winchester, Bronwen Adams

Saturday 23 May	Melbourne Mavericks	63 – 53	Sunshine Coast Lightning	John Cain Arena
7:00pm AEST	1 Goal Shots; Shimona Nelson 56/61 (92%); Reilley Batcheldor 5/9 (56%); Sacha McDonald 2/2 (100%)	Report; Stats	2 Goal Shots; Gabrielle Sinclair 2/2 (100%); 1 Goal Shots; Donnell Wallam 31/40 (78%); Cara Koenen 16/18 (89%); Gabrielle Sinclair 2/2 (100%)	Umpires: Rachael Stebbings, Tim Marshall

Sunday 24 May	Queensland Firebirds	51 – 69	West Coast Fever	Nissan Arena
2:00pm AEST	2 Goal Shots; Mary Cholhok 4/5 (80%); Te Paea Selby-Rickit 2/5 (40%); Elsa Sif Sandholt 0/1 (0%); 1 Goal Shots; Mary Cholhok 16/20 (80%); Te Paea Selby-Rickit 13/15 (87%); Elsa Sif Sandholt 10/12 (83%)	Report; Stats	2 Goal Shots; Sasha Glasgow 3/6 (50%); Olivia Wilkinson 0/1 (0%); 1 Goal Shots; Romelda Aiken-George 46/51 (90%); Sasha Glasgow 12/15 (80%); Olivia Wilkinson 5/6 (83%)	Umpires: Jordan Kiss, Sarah McNamara

Sunday 24 May	Melbourne Vixens	67 – 57	NSW Swifts	John Cain Arena
4:00pm AEST	2 Goal Shots; Kiera Austin 2/2 (100%); Sophie Garbin 0/1 (0%); 1 Goal Shots; Sophie Garbin 48/51 (94%); Kiera Austin 15/17 (88%)	Report; Stats	2 Goal Shots; Grace Whyte 7/9 (78%); Grace Nweke 0/1 (0%); 1 Goal Shots; Grace Nweke 35/37 (95%); Grace Whyte 8/11 (73%)	Umpires: Justin Barnes, Georgina Sulley-Beales

=== Round 12: First Nations Round (Week 2) ===
Saturday 30 May	Sunshine Coast Lightning	74 – 54	GIANTS Netball	UniSC Arena
5:00pm AEST	2 Goal Shots; Gabrielle Sinclair 2/3 (67%); Donnell Wallam 2/4 (50%); 1 Goal Shots; Donnell Wallam 43/51 (84%); Cara Koenen 18/20 (90%); Gabrielle Sinclair 5/5 (100%)	Report; Stats	2 Goal Shots; Sophie Dwyer 7/10 (70%); Matisse Letherbarrow 2/6 (33%); Skye Thompson 1/1 (100%); 1 Goal Shots; Sophie Dwyer 18/20 (90%); Matisse Letherbarrow 14/17 (82%); Skye Thompson 2/3 (67%)	Umpires: Jordan Kiss, Taylah Bennett

Saturday 30 May	West Coast Fever	57 – 60	Melbourne Mavericks	RAC Arena
5:00pm AWST	2 Goal Shots; Romelda Aiken-George 3/4 (75%); Sasha Glasgow 3/5 (60%); 1 Goal Shots; Romelda Aiken-George 38/43 (88%); Sasha Glasgow 7/7 (100%)	Report; Stats	2 Goal Shots; Uneeq Palavi 1/2 (50%); Reilley Batcheldor 1/2 (50%); 1 Goal Shots; Shimona Nelson 27/29 (93%); Uneeq Palavi 18/18 (100%); Reilley Batcheldor 11/13 (85%)	Attendance: 13,847; Umpires: Georgina Sulley-Beales, Tim Marshall

Sunday 31 May	NSW Swifts	68 – 62	Queensland Firebirds	Ken Rosewall Arena
2:00pm AEST	2 Goal Shots; Grace Whyte 4/7 (57%); 1 Goal Shots; Grace Nweke 51/55 (93%); Grace Whyte 9/9 (100%)	Report; Stats	2 Goal Shots; Te Paea Selby-Rickit 6/10 (60%); Mary Cholhok 1/4 (25%); 1 Goal Shots; Mary Cholhok 35/37 (95%); Te Paea Selby-Rickit 13/13 (100%)	Umpires: Rachael Stebbings, Tayla Favell

Sunday 31 May	Tarntanya Karntu	61 – 42	Melbourne Vixens	Adelaide Entertainment Centre
3:30pm ACST	2 Goal Shots; Elmeré van der Berg 3/3 (100%); Lauren Frew 0/1 (0%); Georgie Horjus 0/1 (0%); 1 Goal Shots; Elmeré van der Berg 49/53 (92%); Lauren Frew 3/3 (100%); Georgie Horjus 3/4 (75%)	Report; Stats	2 Goal Shots; Kiera Austin 6/10 (60%); Sophie Garbin 1/6 (17%); 1 Goal Shots; Kiera Austin 15/19 (79%); Sophie Garbin 13/15 (87%)	Umpires: Jemma Cook, Bronwen Adams

=== Round 13 ===
Saturday 6 June	NSW Swifts	60 – 66	Adelaide Thunderbirds	Ken Rosewall Arena
5:00pm AEST	2 Goal Shots; Nicola Barge 9/16 (56%); Grace Nweke 1/2 (50%); 1 Goal Shots; Grace Nweke 36/38 (95%); Nicola Barge 2/2 (100%); Grace Whyte 2/2 (100%)	Report; Stats	2 Goal Shots; Elmeré van der Berg 1/2 (50%); Lauren Frew 0/1 (0%); Kayla Graham 0/1 (0%); 1 Goal Shots; Elmeré van der Berg 51/56 (91%); Lauren Frew 9/9 (100%); Kayla Graham 4/6 (67%)	Umpires: Georgina Sulley-Beales, Jordan Kiss

Saturday 6 June	Queensland Firebirds	66 – 59	Sunshine Coast Lightning	Nissan Arena
7:00pm AEST	2 Goal Shots; Te Paea Selby-Rickit 2/3 (67%); 1 Goal Shots; Mary Cholhok 46/52 (88%); Te Paea Selby-Rickit 16/16 (100%)	Report; Stats	2 Goal Shots; Donnell Wallam 5/8 (63%); Gabrielle Sinclair 1/3 (33%); Cara Koenen 0/1 (0%); 1 Goal Shots; Donnell Wallam 34/46 (74%); Cara Koenen 12/15 (80%); Gabrielle Sinclair 1/1 (100%)	Umpires: Shauna Winchester, Jemma Cook

Sunday 7 June	Melbourne Vixens	50 – 59	Melbourne Mavericks	John Cain Arena
2:00pm AEST	2 Goal Shots; Kimberly Borger 1/2 (50%); Sophie Garbin 0/1 (0%); Kiera Austin 0/2 (0%); 1 Goal Shots; Sophie Garbin 30/31 (97%); Kiera Austin 17/21 (81%); Kimberly Borger 1/1 (100%)	Report; Stats	2 Goal Shots; Reilley Batcheldor 0/2 (0%); 1 Goal Shots; Shimona Nelson 40/43 (93%); Uneeq Palavi 12/13 (92%); Sacha McDonald 4/5 (80%); Reilley Batcheldor 3/4 (75%)	Umpires: Justin Barnes, Tayla Favell

Sunday 7 June	GIANTS Netball	60 – 61	West Coast Fever	Ken Rosewall Arena
4:00pm AEST	2 Goal Shots; Matisse Letherbarrow 5/10 (50%); Sophie Dwyer 3/5 (60%); 1 Goal Shots; Matisse Letherbarrow 25/28 (89%); Sophie Dwyer 19/19 (100%)	Report; Stats	2 Goal Shots; Olivia Wilkinson 4/5 (80%); Sasha Glasgow 2/6 (33%); Romelda Aiken-George 1/3 (33%); 1 Goal Shots; Romelda Aiken-George 38/45 (84%); Sasha Glasgow 5/7 (71%); Olivia Wilkinson 4/7 (57%)	Umpires: Rachael Stebbings, Bronwen Adams

=== Round 14 ===
Saturday 13 June	Sunshine Coast Lightning	49 – 67	Adelaide Thunderbirds	UniSC Arena
5:00pm AEST	2 Goal Shots; Gabrielle Sinclair 4/6 (67%); Donnell Wallam 2/4 (50%); 1 Goal Shots; Donnell Wallam 22/26 (85%); Cara Koenen 9/12 (75%); Gabrielle Sinclair 6/8 (75%)	Report; Stats	2 Goal Shots; Elmeré van der Berg 1/4 (25%); Kayla Graham 0/1 (0%); 1 Goal Shots; Elmeré van der Berg 52/56 (93%); Lauren Frew 5/5 (100%); Georgie Horjus 5/5 (100%); Kayla Graham 3/3 (100%)	Umpires: Bronwen Adams, Justin Barnes

Saturday 13 June	Melbourne Mavericks	60 – 57	Queensland Firebirds	John Cain Arena
7:00pm AEST	1 Goal Shots; Shimona Nelson 33/39 (85%); Uneeq Palavi 14/14 (100%); Reilley Batcheldor 11/12 (92%); Sacha McDonald 2/2 (100%)	Report; Stats	2 Goal Shots; Te Paea Selby-Rickit 1/2 (50%); 1 Goal Shots; Mary Cholhok 40/41 (98%); Te Paea Selby-Rickit 14/15 (93%); Emily Moore 1/2 (50%)	Umpires: Jordan Kiss, Rachael Stebbings

Sunday 14 June	Melbourne Vixens	55 – 64	West Coast Fever	John Cain Arena
2:00pm AEST	2 Goal Shots; Kiera Austin 6/8 (75%); Sophie Garbin 2/4 (50%); Kimberly Borger 0/3 (0%); 1 Goal Shots; Sophie Garbin 23/24 (96%); Kiera Austin 16/18 (89%)	Report; Stats	2 Goal Shots; Sasha Glasgow 5/10 (50%); 1 Goal Shots; Romelda Aiken-George 45/53 (85%); Sasha Glasgow 9/11 (82%)	Umpires: Jemma Cook, Georgina Sulley-Beales

Sunday 14 June	GIANTS Netball	66 – 65	NSW Swifts	Ken Rosewall Arena
4:00pm AEST	2 Goal Shots; Sophie Dwyer 5/5 (100%); Matisse Letherbarrow 1/3 (33%); 1 Goal Shots; Matisse Letherbarrow 39/43 (91%); Sophie Dwyer 15/16 (94%)	Report; Stats	2 Goal Shots; Nicola Barge 5/7 (71%); Lauren Woods 1/3 (33%); Grace Nweke 0/1 (0%); 1 Goal Shots; Grace Nweke 43/49 (88%); Nicola Barge 8/10 (80%); Lauren Woods 2/3 (67%)	Umpires: Tim Marshall, Taylah Bennett

== Ladder ==
2026 Suncorp Super Netball ladder
Pos	Team	P	W	D	L	GF	GA	%	PTS
1	Adelaide Thunderbirds	14	13	0	1	892	704	126.70	52
2	Melbourne Vixens	14	10	0	4	849	803	105.73	40
3	West Coast Fever	14	9	0	5	839	797	105.27	36
4	Melbourne Mavericks	14	9	0	5	831	791	105.06	36
5	NSW Swifts	14	5	0	9	886	924	95.89	20
6	Sunshine Coast Lightning	14	5	0	9	836	873	95.76	20
7	Queensland Firebirds	14	4	0	10	827	897	92.20	16
8	GIANTS Netball	14	1	0	13	759	930	81.61	4
Last updated: Sunday 14 June 2026 — Source

== Finals Series ==
=== Major Semi Final ===
Sunday 21 June; 1:30pm ACST	Report; Stats	Adelaide Thunderbirds (1)	58–44	Melbourne Vixens (2)	Adelaide 36ers Arena; Attendance: 6,375; Umpires: Georgina Sulley-Beales, Bronwen Adams; Reserve umpire: Jordan Kiss	Foxtel, Kayo Sports, Binge
Sunday 21 June; 1:30pm ACST	Report; Stats	Scoring by quarter: 12-14, 13-9, 17-14, 16-7			Adelaide 36ers Arena; Attendance: 6,375; Umpires: Georgina Sulley-Beales, Bronwen Adams; Reserve umpire: Jordan Kiss	Foxtel, Kayo Sports, Binge
Sunday 21 June; 1:30pm ACST	Report; Stats	Scoring by half: 25-23, 33-21			Adelaide 36ers Arena; Attendance: 6,375; Umpires: Georgina Sulley-Beales, Bronwen Adams; Reserve umpire: Jordan Kiss	Foxtel, Kayo Sports, Binge
Sunday 21 June; 1:30pm ACST	Report; Stats	2 Goal Shots; Elmeré van der Berg 0/1 (0%); Georgie Horjus 0/1 (0%); 1 Goal Shots; Elmeré van der Berg 51/56 (91%); Lauren Frew 6/6 (100%); Georgie Horjus 1/1 (100%)		2 Goal Shots; Lily Graham 4/6 (67%); Kiera Austin 3/7 (43%); 1 Goal Shots; Sophie Garbin 16/20 (80%); Kiera Austin 12/14 (86%); Lily Graham 2/2 (100%)	Adelaide 36ers Arena; Attendance: 6,375; Umpires: Georgina Sulley-Beales, Bronwen Adams; Reserve umpire: Jordan Kiss	Foxtel, Kayo Sports, Binge

=== Minor Semi Final ===
Sunday 21 June; 2:00pm AWST	Report; Stats	West Coast Fever (3)	56–52	Melbourne Mavericks (4)	RAC Arena; Attendance: 12,332; Umpires: Rachael Stebbings, Jemma Cook; Reserve umpire: Justin Barnes	Foxtel, Kayo Sports, Binge
Sunday 21 June; 2:00pm AWST	Report; Stats	Scoring by quarter: 12-16, 17-12, 15-12, 12-12			RAC Arena; Attendance: 12,332; Umpires: Rachael Stebbings, Jemma Cook; Reserve umpire: Justin Barnes	Foxtel, Kayo Sports, Binge
Sunday 21 June; 2:00pm AWST	Report; Stats	Scoring by half: 29-28, 27-24			RAC Arena; Attendance: 12,332; Umpires: Rachael Stebbings, Jemma Cook; Reserve umpire: Justin Barnes	Foxtel, Kayo Sports, Binge
Sunday 21 June; 2:00pm AWST	Report; Stats	2 Goal Shots; Sasha Glasgow 4/4 (100%); Romelda Aiken-George 0/1 (0%); 1 Goal Shots; Romelda Aiken-George 42/46 (91%); Sasha Glasgow 6/8 (75%)		2 Goal Shots; Sacha McDonald 2/3 (67%); Reilley Batcheldor 1/1 (100%); Uneeq Palavi 1/5 (20%); 1 Goal Shots; Shimona Nelson 33/33 (100%); Uneeq Palavi 5/6 (83%); Reilley Batcheldor 4/4 (100%); Sacha McDonald 2/2 (100%)	RAC Arena; Attendance: 12,332; Umpires: Rachael Stebbings, Jemma Cook; Reserve umpire: Justin Barnes	Foxtel, Kayo Sports, Binge

=== Preliminary Final ===
Saturday 27 June; 7:30pm AEST	Report; Stats	Melbourne Vixens (2)	62–51	West Coast Fever (3)	John Cain Arena; Attendance: 7,383; Umpires: Jemma Cook, Georgina Sulley-Beales; Reserve umpire: Rachael Stebbings	Foxtel, Kayo Sports, Binge
Saturday 27 June; 7:30pm AEST	Report; Stats	Scoring by quarter: 17-11, 16-13, 18-10, 11-17			John Cain Arena; Attendance: 7,383; Umpires: Jemma Cook, Georgina Sulley-Beales; Reserve umpire: Rachael Stebbings	Foxtel, Kayo Sports, Binge
Saturday 27 June; 7:30pm AEST	Report; Stats	Scoring by half: 33-24, 29-27			John Cain Arena; Attendance: 7,383; Umpires: Jemma Cook, Georgina Sulley-Beales; Reserve umpire: Rachael Stebbings	Foxtel, Kayo Sports, Binge
Saturday 27 June; 7:30pm AEST	Report; Stats	2 Goal Shots; Lily Graham 1/1 (100%); Kiera Austin 0/1 (0%); 1 Goal Shots; Sophie Garbin 35/40 (88%); Kiera Austin 24/25 (96%); Lily Graham 1/2 (50%)		2 Goal Shots; Olivia Wilkinson 4/5 (80%); Sasha Glasgow 2/8 (25%); Romelda Aiken-George 0/2 (0%); 1 Goal Shots; Romelda Aiken-George 36/40 (90%); Sasha Glasgow 3/5 (60%)	John Cain Arena; Attendance: 7,383; Umpires: Jemma Cook, Georgina Sulley-Beales; Reserve umpire: Rachael Stebbings	Foxtel, Kayo Sports, Binge

=== Grand Final ===
Saturday 4 July; 7:30pm AEST	Report; Stats	Adelaide Thunderbirds (1)	61–40	Melbourne Vixens (2)	John Cain Arena; Attendance: 10,040; Umpires: Georgina Sulley-Beales, Jemma Cook; Reserve umpire: Rachael Stebbings	Foxtel, Kayo Sports, Binge
Saturday 4 July; 7:30pm AEST	Report; Stats	Scoring by quarter: 11-12, 21-8, 13-9, 16-11			John Cain Arena; Attendance: 10,040; Umpires: Georgina Sulley-Beales, Jemma Cook; Reserve umpire: Rachael Stebbings	Foxtel, Kayo Sports, Binge
Saturday 4 July; 7:30pm AEST	Report; Stats	Scoring by half: 32-20, 29-20			John Cain Arena; Attendance: 10,040; Umpires: Georgina Sulley-Beales, Jemma Cook; Reserve umpire: Rachael Stebbings	Foxtel, Kayo Sports, Binge
Saturday 4 July; 7:30pm AEST	Report; Stats	2 Goal Shots; Georgie Horjus 1/1 (100%); Kayla Graham 0/2 (0%); 1 Goal Shots; Elmeré van der Berg 51/52 (98%); Georgie Horjus 5/5 (100%); Lauren Frew 3/4 (75%)		2 Goal Shots; Kiera Austin 3/8 (38%); Lily Graham 1/5 (20%); 1 Goal Shots; Sophie Garbin 16/18 (89%); Kiera Austin 12/12 (100%); Lily Graham 4/7 (57%)	John Cain Arena; Attendance: 10,040; Umpires: Georgina Sulley-Beales, Jemma Cook; Reserve umpire: Rachael Stebbings	Foxtel, Kayo Sports, Binge
Saturday 4 July; 7:30pm AEST	Report; Stats	Grand Final MVP: Latanya Wilson			John Cain Arena; Attendance: 10,040; Umpires: Georgina Sulley-Beales, Jemma Cook; Reserve umpire: Rachael Stebbings	Foxtel, Kayo Sports, Binge

== Awards ==
The following players, coaches and umpires were awarded by Netball Australia for performances in the 2026 season:

- The Player of the Year Award was won by Elmeré van der Berg of the Adelaide Thunderbirds.
- The Grand Final MVP Award was won by Latanya Wilson of the Adelaide Thunderbirds.
- The Rookie of the Year Award was won by Ruth Aryang of the West Coast Fever.
- The Joyce Brown Coach of the Year award was won by Tania Obst of the Adelaide Thunderbirds.
- The Lorna McConchie Umpire of the Year award was won by Jemma Cook of New South Wales.
- The Leading Goalscorer Award was won by Elmeré van der Berg of the Adelaide Thunderbirds, who scored 748 points in the regular season.
- The Australian Netball Players' Association (ANPA) Heart of the Game Award was won by Kiera Austin of the Melbourne Vixens.
- The following players were named in the Super Netball Team of the Year:

Attackers

- Goal Shooter: Elmeré van der Berg
  (Adelaide Thunderbirds)
- Goal Attack: Sophie Dwyer
  (GIANTS Netball)

Midcourters

- Wing Attack: Georgie Horjus
  (Adelaide Thunderbirds)
- Centre: Jamie-Lee Price
  (Melbourne Mavericks)
- Wing Defence: Latanya Wilson
  (Adelaide Thunderbirds)

Defenders

- Goal Defence: Fran Williams
  (West Coast Fever)
- Goal Keeper: Shamera Sterling-Humphrey
  (Adelaide Thunderbirds)

Reserves

- Attack Reserve: Shimona Nelson
  (Melbourne Mavericks)
- Midcourt Reserve: Kate Heffernan
  (Adelaide Thunderbirds)
- Defence Reserve: Kelly Jackson
  (Queensland Firebirds)

The Australian Netball Players' Association (ANPA) introduced four Most Outstanding Player awards to be presented for the first time in 2026. All votes came from the league's contracted players.

- The ANPA Attacker of the Year was won by Elmeré van der Berg of the Adelaide Thunderbirds.
- The ANPA Midcourter of the Year was won by Kate Heffernan of the Adelaide Thunderbirds.
- The ANPA Defender of the Year was won by Jessie Grenvold of the Melbourne Mavericks.
- The ANPA International Player of the Year was won by Kate Heffernan of the Adelaide Thunderbirds.
