= 2024 Suncorp Super Netball season =

- League: Suncorp Super Netball
- Sport: Netball
- Duration: 13 April 2024 – 3 August 2024
- Teams: 8
- Total attendance: 366,217
- TV partner: Fox Sports
- Streaming partner: Kayo Sports

Regular season
- Minor premiers: Adelaide Thunderbirds
- Season MVP: Georgie Horjus
- Top scorer: Jhaniele Fowler-Nembhard (813 points)

Finals
- Champions: Adelaide Thunderbirds
- Runners-up: Melbourne Vixens
- Grand Final MVP: Romelda Aiken-George

Seasons
- ← 2023 2025 →

The 2024 Suncorp Super Netball season was the eighth season of the premier netball league in Australia. The season commenced on Saturday 13 April and concluded with the Grand Final on Saturday 3 August at the Adelaide Entertainment Centre. The defending premiers were the Adelaide Thunderbirds, who successfully defended their title after defeating the Melbourne Vixens in the Grand Final.

This was the first season to feature the Melbourne Mavericks, who replaced the Collingwood Magpies at the conclusion of the 2023 season.

== Teams ==
Team	Home court(s)	Coach	Captain(s)	Ref.
Adelaide Thunderbirds	Adelaide Entertainment Centre; Adelaide 36ers Arena	Tania Obst	Hannah Petty	
GIANTS Netball	Ken Rosewall Arena	Julie Fitzgerald	Jo Harten & Jamie-Lee Price	
Melbourne Mavericks	John Cain Arena; MyState Bank Arena	Tracey Neville	Amy Parmenter	
Melbourne Vixens	John Cain Arena	Simone McKinnis	Kate Moloney	
NSW Swifts	Ken Rosewall Arena	Briony Akle	Maddy Proud & Paige Hadley	
Queensland Firebirds	Nissan Arena	Rebecca Bulley	Kim Ravaillion	
Sunshine Coast Lightning	UniSC Arena	Belinda Reynolds	Steph Fretwell	
West Coast Fever	RAC Arena	Dan Ryan	Jess Anstiss	

== Contracted Signings ==
Important dates in relation to player signings for the 2024 season are:

- 13 December 2023 – 19 December 2023: Clubs can sign any one from any team during this time. Clubs can also sign any player who was not contracted to another team, either as a squad member, replacement player or a training partner in 2023.
- 8 January 2024 – 6 April 2024: Training partners can be signed.

The following table is a list of players who moved clubs/leagues into Super Netball, or were elevated to a permanent position in the senior team during the off-season. It does not include contracted players who were re-signed by their original Super Netball clubs.

Name	Moving from	Moving to
Lili Gorman-Brown	NSW Swifts (Training Partner)	NSW Swifts
Sam Winders	Southern Steel (NZL)	GIANTS Netball
Chelsea Pitman	London Pulse (UK)	GIANTS Netball
Jodi-Ann Ward	Collingwood Magpies	GIANTS Netball
Erin O'Brien	GIANTS Netball (Training Partner)	GIANTS Netball
Liz Watson	Melbourne Vixens	Sunshine Coast Lightning
Lessa MiMi	Queensland Firebirds (Training Partner)	Sunshine Coast Lightning
Ava Black	Sunshine Coast Lightning (Training Partner)	Sunshine Coast Lightning
Courtney Bruce	West Coast Fever	Sunshine Coast Lightning
Olivia Wilkinson	Collingwood Magpies (Training Partner)	West Coast Fever
Shanice Beckford	Jamaica	West Coast Fever
Kelsey Browne	Collingwood Magpies	West Coast Fever
Jordan Cransberg	West Coast Fever (Training Partner)	West Coast Fever
Fran Williams	Loughborough Lightning	West Coast Fever
Kadie-Ann Dehaney	Sunshine Coast Lightning	West Coast Fever
Eleanor Cardwell	Adelaide Thunderbirds	Melbourne Mavericks
Sasha Glasgow	West Coast Fever	Melbourne Mavericks
Gabby Sinclair	Cardiff Dragons (UK)	Melbourne Mavericks
Maisie Nankivell	Adelaide Thunderbirds	Melbourne Mavericks
Molly Jovic	Collingwood Magpies	Melbourne Mavericks
Tayla Fraser	NSW Swifts	Melbourne Mavericks
Amy Parmenter	GIANTS Netball	Melbourne Mavericks
Kim Jenner	West Coast Fever	Melbourne Mavericks
Lauren Moore	GIANTS Netball	Melbourne Mavericks
Olivia Lewis	Melbourne Vixens	Melbourne Mavericks
Sophie Garbin	Collingwood Magpies	Melbourne Vixens
Zara Walters	Victorian Pathways	Melbourne Vixens
Rudi Ellis	West Coast Fever	Melbourne Vixens
Tippah Dwan	Adelaide Thunderbirds	Queensland Firebirds
Emily Moore	Queensland Firebirds (Replacement Player)	Queensland Firebirds
Hulita Veve	Queensland Firebirds (Training Partner)	Queensland Firebirds
Isabelle Shearer	Queensland Firebirds (Training Partner)	Queensland Firebirds
Romelda Aiken-George	NSW Swifts (Training Partner)	Adelaide Thunderbirds
Lauren Frew	Adelaide Thunderbirds (Training Partner)	Adelaide Thunderbirds
Laura Scherian	Sunshine Coast Lightning	Adelaide Thunderbirds

== 2024 Suncorp Team Girls Cup ==
- Source: Click here

For the third consecutive year, the pre-season Suncorp Team Girls Cup competition was staged. The round-robin and playoff tournament was held at Ken Rosewall Arena from Friday 22 March to Sunday 24 March. The eight Super Netball teams were split into two groups of four and played each of their group opponents once, before playing an inter-group match to determine places from first to eighth.

The tournament was won by the New South Wales Swifts, who defeated the Melbourne Vixens 45–44 in the final.

=== Pool A Matches ===
Pos	Team	Pld	W	D	L	GF	GA	GD	Pts	Qualification
1	Melbourne Vixens	3	2	0	1	133	119	+14	8	Final
2	Adelaide Thunderbirds	3	2	0	1	117	107	+10	8	Classification matches
3	Sunshine Coast Lightning	3	1	0	2	113	122	−9	4	Classification matches
4	Giants Netball	3	1	0	2	117	132	−15	4	Classification matches

Updated to match(es) played on 23 March 2024. Source:

22 March 2024; 4:30pm AEDT	Report; Stats	Adelaide Thunderbirds	45 – 34	Melbourne Vixens	Ken Rosewall Arena

22 March 2024; 6:50pm AEDT	Report; Stats	Sunshine Coast Lightning	42 – 41	Giants Netball	Ken Rosewall Arena

23 March 2024; 10:30am AEDT	Report; Stats	Adelaide Thunderbirds	38 – 37	Sunshine Coast Lightning	Ken Rosewall Arena

23 March 2024; 11:40am AEDT	Report; Stats	Giants Netball	40 – 56	Melbourne Vixens	Ken Rosewall Arena

23 March 2024; 4:30pm AEDT	Report; Stats	Melbourne Vixens	43 – 34	Sunshine Coast Lightning	Ken Rosewall Arena

23 March 2024; 5:40pm AEDT	Report; Stats	Giants Netball	36 – 34	Adelaide Thunderbirds	Ken Rosewall Arena

=== Pool B Matches ===
Pos	Team	Pld	W	D	L	GF	GA	GD	Pts	Qualification
1	New South Wales Swifts	3	2	0	1	145	134	+11	8	Final
2	Queensland Firebirds	3	2	0	1	128	136	−8	8	Classification matches
3	West Coast Fever	3	1	1	1	145	144	+1	6	Classification matches
4	Melbourne Mavericks	3	0	1	2	133	137	−4	2	Classification matches

Updated to match(es) played on 23 March 2024. Source:

22 March 2024; 5:40pm AEDT	Report; Stats	Melbourne Mavericks	42 – 43	Queensland Firebirds	Ken Rosewall Arena

22 March 2024; 8:00pm AEDT	Report; Stats	New South Wales Swifts	50 – 52	West Coast Fever	Ken Rosewall Arena

23 March 2024; 12:50pm AEDT	Report; Stats	Queensland Firebirds	41 – 51	New South Wales Swifts	Ken Rosewall Arena

23 March 2024; 2:00pm AEDT	Report; Stats	West Coast Fever	50 – 50	Melbourne Mavericks	Ken Rosewall Arena

23 March 2024; 6:50pm AEDT	Report; Stats	Queensland Firebirds	44 – 43	West Coast Fever	Ken Rosewall Arena

23 March 2024; 8:00pm AEDT	Report; Stats	New South Wales Swifts	44 – 41	Melbourne Mavericks	Ken Rosewall Arena

=== Finals ===
24 March 2024; 1:00pm AEDT	Report; Stats	Giants Netball	40 – 36	Melbourne Mavericks	Ken Rosewall Arena

24 March 2024; 2:10pm AEDT	Report; Stats	Sunshine Coast Lightning	42 – 40	West Coast Fever	Ken Rosewall Arena

24 March 2024; 3:20pm AEDT	Report; Stats	Adelaide Thunderbirds	50 – 38	Queensland Firebirds	Ken Rosewall Arena

24 March 2024; 4:30pm AEDT	Report; Stats	Melbourne Vixens	44 – 45	New South Wales Swifts	Ken Rosewall Arena

Place	Team
Champions	New South Wales Swifts
Runners-up	Melbourne Vixens
Third	Adelaide Thunderbirds
4th	Queensland Firebirds
5th	Sunshine Coast Lightning
6th	West Coast Fever
7th	Giants Netball
8th	Melbourne Mavericks

2024 #TeamGirls Cup winners

== Regular season ==
- Source: Click here (all times are in local time)

=== Round 1 ===
Saturday 13 April	Giants Netball	65 – 84	West Coast Fever	Ken Rosewall Arena
5:00pm AEST	2 Goal Shots; Sophie Dwyer 9/15 (60%); Jo Harten 5/8 (63%); 1 Goal Shots; Jo Harten 24/26 (92%); Sophie Dwyer 13/17 (76%)	Report; Stats	2 Goal Shots; Jhaniele Fowler-Nembhard 3/4 (75%); Olivia Wilkinson 1/3 (33%); Shanice Beckford 0/2 (0%); 1 Goal Shots; Jhaniele Fowler-Nembhard 64/64 (100%); Shanice Beckford 12/16 (75%); Olivia Wilkinson 0/1 (0%)	Attendance: 3,018

Saturday 13 April	Adelaide Thunderbirds	63 – 62	Queensland Firebirds	Adelaide Entertainment Centre
6:30pm ACST	2 Goal Shots; Lauren Frew 1/1 (100%); Georgie Horjus 1/1 (100%); 1 Goal Shots; Romelda Aiken-George 48/57 (84%); Lauren Frew 9/12 (75%); Georgie Horjus 2/2 (100%)	Report; Stats	2 Goal Shots; Tippah Dwan 5/6 (83%); Donnell Wallam 4/5 (80%); 1 Goal Shots; Donnell Wallam 31/36 (86%); Tippah Dwan 13/14 (93%)	Attendance: 6,668

Sunday 14 April	Melbourne Mavericks	61 – 68	Melbourne Vixens	John Cain Arena
2:00pm AEST	2 Goal Shots; Eleanor Cardwell 7/13 (54%); Rolene Streutker 3/5 (60%); Gabrielle Sinclair 1/3 (33%); 1 Goal Shots; Eleanor Cardwell 25/28 (89%); Rolene Streutker 7/8 (88%); Gabrielle Sinclair 7/8 (88%)	Report; Stats	2 Goal Shots; Kiera Austin 5/7 (71%); Sophie Garbin 3/3 (100%); 1 Goal Shots; Sophie Garbin 39/43 (91%); Kiera Austin 13/15 (87%)	Attendance: 8,253

Sunday 14 April	Sunshine Coast Lightning	79 – 63	New South Wales Swifts	UniSC Arena
4:00pm AEST	2 Goal Shots; Steph Fretwell 4/6 (67%); Reilley Batcheldor 2/2 (100%); 1 Goal Shots; Cara Koenen 50/53 (94%); Steph Fretwell 16/18 (89%); Reilley Batcheldor 1/1 (100%)	Report; Stats	2 Goal Shots; Helen Housby 8/8 (100%); Sophie Fawns 4/6 (67%); Sam Wallace-Joseph 1/2 (50%); 1 Goal Shots; Sam Wallace-Joseph 23/24 (96%); Helen Housby 9/10 (90%); Sophie Fawns 5/5 (100%)	Attendance: 2,863

=== Round 2 ===
Saturday 20 April	Queensland Firebirds	65 – 62	Giants Netball	Nissan Arena
5:00pm AEST	2 Goal Shots; Donnell Wallam 2/3 (67%); Tippah Dwan 1/2 (50%); 1 Goal Shots; Donnell Wallam 51/57 (89%); Tippah Dwan 8/10 (80%)	Report; Stats	2 Goal Shots; Sophie Dwyer 6/8 (75%); Jo Harten 5/10 (50%); 1 Goal Shots; Jo Harten 23/25 (92%); Sophie Dwyer 17/21 (81%)	Attendance: 2,842

Saturday 20 April	Melbourne Vixens	54 – 53	Adelaide Thunderbirds	John Cain Arena
7:00pm AEST	2 Goal Shots; Kiera Austin 6/10 (60%); Sophie Garbin 2/5 (40%); 1 Goal Shots; Sophie Garbin 19/19 (100%); Kiera Austin 19/23 (83%)	Report; Stats	2 Goal Shots; Romelda Aiken-George 0/1 (0%); Georgie Horjus 0/1 (0%); 1 Goal Shots; Romelda Aiken-George 28/30 (93%); Georgie Horjus 16/17 (94%); Lucy Austin 6/8 (75%); Lauren Frew 3/4 (75%)	Attendance: 7,335

Sunday 21 April	West Coast Fever	81 – 56	Sunshine Coast Lightning	RAC Arena
12:00pm AWST	2 Goal Shots; Jhaniele Fowler-Nembhard 3/3 (100%); Olivia Wilkinson 2/4 (50%); Shanice Beckford 0/1 (0%); 1 Goal Shots; Jhaniele Fowler-Nembhard 63/65 (97%); Shanice Beckford 8/11 (73%)	Report; Stats	2 Goal Shots; Steph Fretwell 5/7 (71%); Reilley Batcheldor 3/5 (60%); 1 Goal Shots; Cara Koenen 21/25 (84%); Reilley Batcheldor 10/13 (77%); Steph Fretwell 9/11 (82%)	Attendance: 8,702

Sunday 21 April	New South Wales Swifts	67 – 56	Melbourne Mavericks	Ken Rosewall Arena
4:00pm AEST	2 Goal Shots; Helen Housby 7/9 (78%); Sam Wallace-Joseph 1/1 (100%); Sophie Fawns 1/4 (25%); 1 Goal Shots; Sam Wallace-Joseph 37/37 (100%); Helen Housby 9/10 (90%); Sophie Fawns 3/5 (60%)	Report; Stats	2 Goal Shots; Gabrielle Sinclair 7/8 (88%); Eleanor Cardwell 3/6 (50%); 1 Goal Shots; Eleanor Cardwell 23/25 (92%); Rolene Streutker 8/9 (89%); Gabrielle Sinclair 5/7 (71%)	Attendance: 6,607

=== Round 3 ===
Saturday 27 April	Sunshine Coast Lightning	56 – 60 (ET)	Adelaide Thunderbirds	UniSC Arena
5:00pm AEST	2 Goal Shots; Steph Fretwell 6/9 (67%); Reilley Batcheldor 1/3 (33%); 1 Goal Shots; Cara Koenen 24/26 (92%); Steph Fretwell 14/18 (78%); Reilley Batcheldor 4/6 (67%)	Report; Stats	2 Goal Shots; Lauren Frew 1/3 (33%); 1 Goal Shots; Romelda Aiken-George 43/48 (90%); Lauren Frew 12/18 (67%); Lucy Austin 3/5 (60%); Georgie Horjus 0/1 (0%)	Attendance: 2,769

Saturday 27 April	Melbourne Mavericks	62 – 69	West Coast Fever	John Cain Arena
7:00pm AEST	2 Goal Shots; Gabrielle Sinclair 6/8 (75%); Eleanor Cardwell 4/7 (57%); 1 Goal Shots; Shimona Jok 27/29 (93%); Eleanor Cardwell 14/15 (93%); Gabrielle Sinclair 1/1 (100%)	Report; Stats	2 Goal Shots; Shanice Beckford 4/5 (80%); 1 Goal Shots; Jhaniele Fowler-Nembhard 50/50 (100%); Shanice Beckford 10/11 (91%); Olivia Wilkinson 1/1 (100%)	Attendance: 2,486

Sunday 28 April	Queensland Firebirds	73 – 77 (ET)	New South Wales Swifts	Nissan Arena
2:00pm AEST	2 Goal Shots; Donnell Wallam 4/7 (57%); Tippah Dwan 3/7 (43%); 1 Goal Shots; Donnell Wallam 47/53 (89%); Tippah Dwan 12/13 (92%)	Report; Stats	2 Goal Shots; Helen Housby 7/8 (88%); Sam Wallace-Joseph 2/6 (33%); Sophie Fawns 0/1 (0%); 1 Goal Shots; Sam Wallace-Joseph 39/40 (98%); Helen Housby 12/13 (92%); Sophie Fawns 8/9 (89%)	Attendance: 3,724

Sunday 28 April	Giants Netball	44 – 63	Melbourne Vixens	Ken Rosewall Arena
4:00pm AEST	2 Goal Shots; Matisse Letherbarrow 6/12 (50%); Jo Harten 2/7 (29%); Sophie Dwyer 0/1 (0%); 1 Goal Shots; Matisse Letherbarrow 20/22 (91%); Jo Harten 5/5 (100%); Sophie Dwyer 3/4 (75%)	Report; Stats	2 Goal Shots; Kiera Austin 3/6 (50%); Lily Graham 0/1 (0%); Sophie Garbin 0/3 (0%); 1 Goal Shots; Sophie Garbin 39/45 (87%); Kiera Austin 18/22 (82%)	Attendance: 2,581

=== Round 4 - Inclusion Round ===
Saturday 4 May	Sunshine Coast Lightning	64 – 65	Melbourne Mavericks	UniSC Arena
5:00pm AEST	2 Goal Shots; Reilley Batcheldor 1/1 (100%); Steph Fretwell 0/2 (0%); 1 Goal Shots; Cara Koenen 43/44 (98%); Steph Fretwell 19/25 (76%)	Report; Stats	2 Goal Shots; Gabrielle Sinclair 5/6 (83%); Eleanor Cardwell 1/4 (25%); 1 Goal Shots; Shimona Jok 35/36 (97%); Eleanor Cardwell 14/15 (93%); Gabrielle Sinclair 4/4 (100%)	Attendance: 2,612

Saturday 4 May	Adelaide Thunderbirds	69 – 49	Giants Netball	Adelaide Entertainment Centre
6:30pm ACST	2 Goal Shots; Lucy Austin 2/3 (67%); Georgie Horjus 2/4 (50%); Lauren Frew 1/2 (50%); 1 Goal Shots; Romelda Aiken-George 29/35 (83%); Lucy Austin 19/21 (90%); Lauren Frew 7/7 (100%); Georgie Horjus 4/5 (80%)	Report; Stats	2 Goal Shots; Sophie Dwyer 5/8 (63%); Jo Harten 2/6 (33%); Matisse Letherbarrow 1/1 (100%); 1 Goal Shots; Sophie Dwyer 16/19 (84%); Jo Harten 14/18 (78%); Matisse Letherbarrow 3/3 (100%)	Attendance: 6,522

Sunday 5 May	Melbourne Vixens	68 – 55	Queensland Firebirds	John Cain Arena
2:00pm AEST	2 Goal Shots; Kiera Austin 4/9 (44%); Sophie Garbin 1/5 (20%); 1 Goal Shots; Sophie Garbin 48/52 (92%); Kiera Austin 10/15 (67%)	Report; Stats	2 Goal Shots; Emily Moore 3/3 (100%); Donnell Wallam 2/4 (50%); Tippah Dwan 0/2 (0%); 1 Goal Shots; Donnell Wallam 37/40 (93%); Emily Moore 7/8 (88%); Tippah Dwan 1/3 (33%)	Attendance: 8,639

Sunday 5 May	New South Wales Swifts	59 – 75	West Coast Fever	Ken Rosewall Arena
4:00pm AEST	2 Goal Shots; Sophie Fawns 8/10 (80%); Sam Wallace-Joseph 1/3 (33%); Helen Housby 0/4 (0%); 1 Goal Shots; Sam Wallace-Joseph 34/35 (97%); Sophie Fawns 4/7 (57%); Helen Housby 3/3 (100%)	Report; Stats	2 Goal Shots; Shanice Beckford 6/6 (100%); Jhaniele Fowler-Nembhard 1/2 (50%); Olivia Wilkinson 0/1 (0%); 1 Goal Shots; Jhaniele Fowler-Nembhard 59/60 (98%); Shanice Beckford 2/3 (67%)	Attendance: 5,089

=== Round 5 ===
Friday 10 May	West Coast Fever	94 – 58	Queensland Firebirds	RAC Arena
6:30pm AWST	2 Goal Shots; Olivia Wilkinson 5/6 (83%); Shanice Beckford 4/5 (80%); 1 Goal Shots; Jhaniele Fowler-Nembhard 62/64 (97%); Olivia Wilkinson 10/11 (91%); Shanice Beckford 4/6 (67%)	Report; Stats	2 Goal Shots; Donnell Wallam 5/10 (50%); Emily Moore 2/3 (67%); Tippah Dwan 1/3 (33%); 1 Goal Shots; Donnell Wallam 37/44 (84%); Tippah Dwan 4/5 (80%); Emily Moore 1/2 (50%)	Attendance: 6,312

Saturday 11 May	Melbourne Mavericks	37 – 59	Adelaide Thunderbirds	John Cain Arena
5:00pm AEST	2 Goal Shots; Gabrielle Sinclair 5/5 (100%); Shimona Jok 1/2 (50%); Natalie Butler 1/4 (25%); 1 Goal Shots; Shimona Jok 14/17 (82%); Gabrielle Sinclair 6/9 (67%); Natalie Butler 3/3 (100%)	Report; Stats	2 Goal Shots; Lucy Austin 1/2 (50%); Georgie Horjus 0/1 (0%); Lauren Frew 0/2 (0%); 1 Goal Shots; Romelda Aiken-George 32/34 (94%); Lucy Austin 12/14 (86%); Lauren Frew 9/11 (82%); Georgie Horjus 4/5 (80%)	Attendance: 2,843

Saturday 11 May	Giants Netball	86 – 80 (ET)	Sunshine Coast Lightning	Ken Rosewall Arena
7:00pm AEST	2 Goal Shots; Sophie Dwyer 6/8 (75%); Jo Harten 3/4 (75%); Matisse Letherbarrow 3/5 (60%); 1 Goal Shots; Jo Harten 29/30 (97%); Sophie Dwyer 27/30 (90%); Matisse Letherbarrow 6/6 (100%)	Report; Stats	2 Goal Shots; Reilley Batcheldor 5/11 (45%); Steph Fretwell 4/11 (36%); 1 Goal Shots; Cara Koenen 45/47 (96%); Steph Fretwell 10/12 (83%); Reilley Batcheldor 7/9 (78%)	Attendance: 2,598

Sunday 12 May	New South Wales Swifts	59 – 61	Melbourne Vixens	Ken Rosewall Arena
2:00pm AEST	2 Goal Shots; Helen Housby 10/13 (77%); Sophie Fawns 3/8 (38%); 1 Goal Shots; Sam Wallace-Joseph 14/16 (88%); Helen Housby 12/12 (100%); Sophie Fawns 7/7 (100%)	Report; Stats	2 Goal Shots; Kiera Austin 3/3 (100%); Sophie Garbin 3/5 (60%); 1 Goal Shots; Sophie Garbin 27/30 (90%); Kiera Austin 22/24 (92%)	Attendance: 5,978

=== Round 6 ===
Saturday 18 May	Melbourne Vixens	57 – 64	Sunshine Coast Lightning	John Cain Arena
5:00pm AEST	2 Goal Shots; Kiera Austin 4/7 (57%); Sophie Garbin 3/7 (43%); 1 Goal Shots; Sophie Garbin 31/33 (94%); Kiera Austin 12/13 (92%)	Report; Stats	2 Goal Shots; Steph Fretwell 1/3 (33%); Reilley Batcheldor 1/3 (33%); 1 Goal Shots; Cara Koenen 37/46 (80%); Steph Fretwell 15/17 (88%); Reilley Batcheldor 8/9 (89%)	Attendance: 8,578

Saturday 18 May	West Coast Fever	57 – 56	Adelaide Thunderbirds	RAC Arena
5:00pm AWST	2 Goal Shots; Shanice Beckford 2/8 (25%); Jhaniele Fowler-Nembhard 1/2 (50%); 1 Goal Shots; Jhaniele Fowler-Nembhard 49/49 (100%); Shanice Beckford 2/2 (100%)	Report; Stats	2 Goal Shots; Lucy Austin 3/4 (75%); Lauren Frew 1/1 (100%); Georgie Horjus 0/1 (0%); 1 Goal Shots; Romelda Aiken-George 34/40 (85%); Lauren Frew 9/11 (82%); Georgie Horjus 3/3 (100%); Lucy Austin 2/2 (100%)	Attendance: 7,824

Sunday 19 May	Queensland Firebirds	62 – 69	Melbourne Mavericks	Nissan Arena
2:00pm AEST	2 Goal Shots; Emily Moore 5/6 (83%); Tippah Dwan 2/4 (50%); Donnell Wallam 1/4 (25%); 1 Goal Shots; Donnell Wallam 32/34 (94%); Tippah Dwan 10/12 (83%); Emily Moore 4/6 (67%)	Report; Stats	2 Goal Shots; Eleanor Cardwell 1/2 (50%); 1 Goal Shots; Shimona Jok 50/55 (91%); Eleanor Cardwell 17/20 (85%)	Attendance: 3,689

Sunday 19 May	New South Wales Swifts	76 – 52	Giants Netball	Ken Rosewall Arena
4:00pm AEST	2 Goal Shots; Helen Housby 7/13 (54%); Sam Wallace-Joseph 2/4 (50%); Sophie Fawns 1/1 (100%); 1 Goal Shots; Sam Wallace-Joseph 35/36 (97%); Helen Housby 17/18 (94%); Sophie Fawns 4/6 (67%)	Report; Stats	2 Goal Shots; Sophie Dwyer 5/8 (63%); Jo Harten 2/3 (67%); Matisse Letherbarrow 0/1 (0%); 1 Goal Shots; Jo Harten 20/21 (95%); Matisse Letherbarrow 9/9 (100%); Sophie Dwyer 9/10 (90%)	Attendance: 7,423

=== Round 7 - First Nations Round (Week 1) ===
Saturday 25 May	Sunshine Coast Lightning	76 – 65	Queensland Firebirds	UniSC Arena
5:00pm AEST	2 Goal Shots; Steph Fretwell 2/4 (50%); Reilley Batcheldor 1/2 (50%); 1 Goal Shots; Cara Koenen 52/59 (88%); Steph Fretwell 16/19 (84%); Reilley Batcheldor 2/4 (50%)	Report; Stats	2 Goal Shots; Donnell Wallam 5/10 (50%); Tippah Dwan 3/8 (38%); Emily Moore 0/2 (0%); 1 Goal Shots; Donnell Wallam 41/46 (89%); Tippah Dwan 8/11 (73%)	Attendance: 2,841

Saturday 25 May	Adelaide Thunderbirds	58 – 33	New South Wales Swifts	Adelaide Entertainment Centre
6:30pm ACST	2 Goal Shots; Lucy Austin 2/2 (100%); Lauren Frew 1/2 (50%); Georgie Horjus 0/1 (0%); 1 Goal Shots; Romelda Aiken-George 30/32 (94%); Georgie Horjus 9/9 (100%); Lucy Austin 8/9 (89%); Lauren Frew 5/7 (71%)	Report; Stats	2 Goal Shots; Sophie Fawns 2/3 (67%); Helen Housby 2/6 (33%); 1 Goal Shots; Sophie Fawns 12/16 (75%); Helen Housby 6/8 (75%); Sam Wallace-Joseph 5/7 (71%); Grace Whyte 2/4 (50%)	Attendance: 8,447

Sunday 26 May	Melbourne Mavericks	59 – 66	Giants Netball	John Cain Arena
2:00pm AEST	2 Goal Shots; Eleanor Cardwell 3/6 (50%); Shimona Jok 1/1 (100%); Gabrielle Sinclair 1/3 (33%); 1 Goal Shots; Shimona Jok 39/41 (95%); Eleanor Cardwell 10/12 (83%)	Report; Stats	2 Goal Shots; Matisse Letherbarrow 3/3 (100%); Jo Harten 3/5 (60%); Sophie Dwyer 1/5 (20%); 1 Goal Shots; Jo Harten 30/34 (88%); Sophie Dwyer 19/20 (95%); Matisse Letherbarrow 3/3 (100%)	Attendance: 2,932

Sunday 26 May	West Coast Fever	65 – 76	Melbourne Vixens	RAC Arena
2:00pm AWST	2 Goal Shots; Shanice Beckford 5/7 (71%); Jhaniele Fowler-Nembhard 2/4 (50%); Olivia Wilkinson 2/4 (50%); 1 Goal Shots; Jhaniele Fowler-Nembhard 41/43 (95%); Olivia Wilkinson 4/4 (100%); Shanice Beckford 2/4 (50%)	Report; Stats	2 Goal Shots; Kiera Austin 4/10 (40%); Sophie Garbin 1/2 (50%); 1 Goal Shots; Sophie Garbin 45/50 (90%); Kiera Austin 21/22 (95%)	Attendance: 11,119

=== Round 8 ===
Saturday 1 June	Melbourne Vixens	74 – 60	Giants Netball	John Cain Arena
5:00pm AEST	2 Goal Shots; Sophie Garbin 3/4 (75%); Kiera Austin 3/5 (60%); 1 Goal Shots; Sophie Garbin 48/51 (94%); Kiera Austin 14/16 (88%)	Report; Stats	2 Goal Shots; Matisse Letherbarrow 5/9 (56%); Sophie Dwyer 3/6 (50%); 1 Goal Shots; Matisse Letherbarrow 31/34 (91%); Sophie Dwyer 13/15 (87%)	Attendance: 8,556

Saturday 1 June	Sunshine Coast Lightning	68 – 71	West Coast Fever	UniSC Arena
7:00pm AEST	2 Goal Shots; Steph Fretwell 3/6 (50%); Cara Koenen 0/1 (0%); 1 Goal Shots; Cara Koenen 42/46 (91%); Steph Fretwell 20/24 (83%)	Report; Stats	2 Goal Shots; Olivia Wilkinson 2/2 (100%); Jhaniele Fowler-Nembhard 2/4 (50%); Shanice Beckford 1/3 (33%); 1 Goal Shots; Jhaniele Fowler-Nembhard 53/54 (98%); Olivia Wilkinson 4/4 (100%); Shanice Beckford 4/5 (80%)	Attendance: 2,668

Sunday 2 June	Queensland Firebirds	52 – 42	Adelaide Thunderbirds	Nissan Arena
2:00pm AEST	2 Goal Shots; Donnell Wallam 1/4 (25%); 1 Goal Shots; Donnell Wallam 34/35 (97%); Emily Moore 10/12 (83%); Tippah Dwan 6/7 (86%)	Report; Stats	2 Goal Shots; Lucy Austin 4/7 (57%); Kayla Graham 0/1 (0%); Lauren Frew 0/2 (0%); 1 Goal Shots; Romelda Aiken-George 12/16 (75%); Lauren Frew 11/13 (85%); Lucy Austin 7/8 (88%); Kayla Graham 4/4 (100%)	Attendance: 4,005

Sunday 2 June	Melbourne Mavericks	64 – 58	New South Wales Swifts	John Cain Arena
4:00pm AEST	2 Goal Shots; Gabrielle Sinclair 4/6 (67%); Eleanor Cardwell 1/1 (100%); Shimona Jok 0/1 (0%); 1 Goal Shots; Shimona Jok 41/45 (91%); Gabrielle Sinclair 10/11 (91%); Eleanor Cardwell 3/3 (100%)	Report; Stats	2 Goal Shots; Helen Housby 8/11 (73%); Sophie Fawns 3/6 (50%); 1 Goal Shots; Helen Housby 20/21 (95%); Sophie Fawns 14/17 (82%); Grace Whyte 2/2 (100%)	Attendance: 2,658

=== Round 9 ===
Saturday 8 June	New South Wales Swifts	64 – 66	Sunshine Coast Lightning	Ken Rosewall Arena
5:00pm AEST	2 Goal Shots; Sophie Fawns 5/8 (63%); Helen Housby 4/9 (44%); 1 Goal Shots; Sophie Fawns 35/41 (85%); Helen Housby 11/12 (92%)	Report; Stats	2 Goal Shots; Steph Fretwell 6/7 (86%); Reilley Batcheldor 1/1 (100%); 1 Goal Shots; Cara Koenen 27/30 (90%); Steph Fretwell 21/22 (95%); Reilley Batcheldor 4/4 (100%)	Attendance: 7,236

Saturday 8 June	Adelaide Thunderbirds	68 – 50	West Coast Fever	Adelaide Entertainment Centre
6:30pm ACST	2 Goal Shots; Lauren Frew 1/1 (100%); Lucy Austin 1/3 (33%); 1 Goal Shots; Romelda Aiken-George 50/60 (83%); Lauren Frew 7/11 (64%); Georgie Horjus 5/6 (83%); Lucy Austin 2/2 (100%)	Report; Stats	2 Goal Shots; Alice Teague-Neeld 2/3 (67%); Jhaniele Fowler-Nembhard 2/6 (33%); Olivia Wilkinson 0/1 (0%); Shanice Beckford 0/2 (0%); 1 Goal Shots; Jhaniele Fowler-Nembhard 39/40 (98%); Olivia Wilkinson 3/3 (100%); Shanice Beckford 0/1 (0%); Alice Teague-Neeld 0/2 (0%)	Attendance: 8,905

Sunday 9 June	Giants Netball	71 – 67	Queensland Firebirds	Ken Rosewall Arena
4:00pm AEST	2 Goal Shots; Sophie Dwyer 8/11 (73%); Jo Harten 2/6 (33%); 1 Goal Shots; Jo Harten 33/35 (94%); Sophie Dwyer 18/19 (95%)	Report; Stats	2 Goal Shots; Donnell Wallam 3/4 (75%); Tippah Dwan 2/4 (50%); 1 Goal Shots; Donnell Wallam 41/44 (93%); Tippah Dwan 8/8 (100%); Alison Miller 4/4 (100%); Emily Moore 4/6 (67%)	Attendance: 3,164

Monday 10 June	Melbourne Vixens	77 – 58	Melbourne Mavericks	John Cain Arena
1:00pm AEST	2 Goal Shots; Kiera Austin 7/7 (100%); Lily Graham 1/1 (100%); Sophie Garbin 1/2 (50%); 1 Goal Shots; Sophie Garbin 50/54 (93%); Kiera Austin 9/12 (75%); Lily Graham 0/1 (0%)	Report; Stats	2 Goal Shots; Gabrielle Sinclair 6/9 (67%); 1 Goal Shots; Shimona Jok 38/40 (95%); Gabrielle Sinclair 8/11 (73%)	Attendance: 9,022

=== Round 10 ===
Saturday 15 June	Giants Netball	42 – 57	Adelaide Thunderbirds	Ken Rosewall Arena
5:00pm AEST	2 Goal Shots; Sophie Dwyer 4/7 (57%); Matisse Letherbarrow 1/2 (50%); Jo Harten 0/2 (0%); 1 Goal Shots; Sophie Dwyer 16/18 (89%); Jo Harten 14/14 (100%); Matisse Letherbarrow 2/2 (100%)	Report; Stats	2 Goal Shots; Georgie Horjus 0/1 (0%); Lauren Frew 0/2 (0%); 1 Goal Shots; Romelda Aiken-George 38/47 (81%); Lauren Frew 10/11 (91%); Georgie Horjus 5/6 (83%); Lucy Austin 4/5 (80%)	Attendance: 3,182

Saturday 15 June	Sunshine Coast Lightning	61 – 63	Melbourne Vixens	UniSC Arena
7:00pm AEST	2 Goal Shots; Steph Fretwell 5/7 (71%); Reilley Batcheldor 3/6 (50%); 1 Goal Shots; Cara Koenen 21/21 (100%); Steph Fretwell 20/24 (83%); Reilley Batcheldor 4/4 (100%)	Report; Stats	2 Goal Shots; Kiera Austin 3/6 (50%); Sophie Garbin 1/1 (100%); 1 Goal Shots; Sophie Garbin 36/40 (90%); Kiera Austin 19/23 (83%)	Attendance: 2,908

Sunday 16 June	Melbourne Mavericks	73 – 61	Queensland Firebirds	John Cain Arena
2:00pm AEST	2 Goal Shots; Gabrielle Sinclair 7/7 (100%); 1 Goal Shots; Shimona Jok 47/49 (96%); Gabrielle Sinclair 12/12 (100%)	Report; Stats	2 Goal Shots; Donnell Wallam 6/9 (67%); Tippah Dwan 0/1 (0%); Emily Moore 0/2 (0%); 1 Goal Shots; Donnell Wallam 43/49 (88%); Tippah Dwan 5/6 (83%); Emily Moore 1/2 (50%)	Attendance: 3,582

Sunday 16 June	West Coast Fever	78 – 71	New South Wales Swifts	RAC Arena
2:00pm AWST	2 Goal Shots; Jhaniele Fowler-Nembhard 1/1 (100%); Shanice Beckford 0/3 (0%); 1 Goal Shots; Jhaniele Fowler-Nembhard 74/75 (99%); Shanice Beckford 2/6 (33%)	Report; Stats	2 Goal Shots; Sophie Fawns 11/15 (73%); Helen Housby 7/10 (70%); Grace Whyte 0/1 (0%); 1 Goal Shots; Helen Housby 19/20 (95%); Sophie Fawns 16/22 (73%)	Attendance: 11,267

=== Round 11 ===
Saturday 22 June	Queensland Firebirds	78 – 70	West Coast Fever	Nissan Arena
5:00pm AEST	2 Goal Shots; Donnell Wallam 9/14 (64%); Tippah Dwan 1/5 (20%); 1 Goal Shots; Donnell Wallam 48/53 (91%); Tippah Dwan 10/12 (83%)	Report; Stats	2 Goal Shots; Jhaniele Fowler-Nembhard 4/9 (44%); Olivia Wilkinson 0/2 (0%); Shanice Beckford 0/3 (0%); 1 Goal Shots; Jhaniele Fowler-Nembhard 57/58 (98%); Shanice Beckford 4/5 (80%); Olivia Wilkinson 1/1 (100%)	Attendance: 3,516

Saturday 22 June	Adelaide Thunderbirds	67 – 41	Melbourne Mavericks	Adelaide Entertainment Centre
6:30pm ACST	2 Goal Shots; Georgie Horjus 1/1 (100%); Lucy Austin 1/3 (33%); Lauren Frew 0/1 (0%); 1 Goal Shots; Romelda Aiken-George 39/43 (91%); Lauren Frew 13/14 (93%); Lucy Austin 7/8 (88%); Georgie Horjus 4/5 (80%)	Report; Stats	2 Goal Shots; Eleanor Cardwell 2/4 (50%); Gabrielle Sinclair 1/4 (25%); 1 Goal Shots; Shimona Jok 25/28 (89%); Eleanor Cardwell 8/9 (89%); Gabrielle Sinclair 2/3 (67%)	Attendance: 8,192

Sunday 23 June	Melbourne Vixens	69 – 49	New South Wales Swifts	John Cain Arena
2:00pm AEST	2 Goal Shots; Kiera Austin 4/7 (57%); Sophie Garbin 2/8 (25%); Lily Graham 0/1 (0%); 1 Goal Shots; Sophie Garbin 34/37 (92%); Kiera Austin 21/22 (95%); Lily Graham 2/2 (100%)	Report; Stats	2 Goal Shots; Uneeq Palavi 3/5 (60%); Helen Housby 2/4 (50%); Sophie Fawns 2/5 (40%); 1 Goal Shots; Uneeq Palavi 18/19 (95%); Helen Housby 10/10 (100%); Sophie Fawns 7/7 (100%)	Attendance: 8,846

Sunday 23 June	Sunshine Coast Lightning	71 – 66	Giants Netball	UniSC Arena
4:00pm AEST	2 Goal Shots; Steph Fretwell 8/11 (73%); Reilley Batcheldor 0/1 (0%); 1 Goal Shots; Cara Koenen 34/40 (85%); Steph Fretwell 21/22 (95%); Reilley Batcheldor 0/1 (0%)	Report; Stats	2 Goal Shots; Sophie Dwyer 6/8 (75%); Jo Harten 6/9 (67%); 1 Goal Shots; Sophie Dwyer 23/28 (82%); Jo Harten 19/19 (100%)	Attendance: 2,942

=== Round 12 ===
Saturday 29 June	Adelaide Thunderbirds	73 – 58	Melbourne Vixens	Adelaide Entertainment Centre
4:30pm ACST	2 Goal Shots; Lucy Austin 2/2 (100%); Georgie Horjus 2/3 (67%); Lauren Frew 1/1 (100%); 1 Goal Shots; Romelda Aiken-George 47/53 (89%); Georgie Horjus 8/8 (100%); Lucy Austin 5/5 (100%); Lauren Frew 3/4 (75%)	Report; Stats	2 Goal Shots; Kiera Austin 7/10 (70%); Sophie Garbin 3/5 (60%); Lily Graham 1/1 (100%); 1 Goal Shots; Sophie Garbin 23/26 (88%); Kiera Austin 13/16 (81%)	Attendance: 8,286

Saturday 29 June	Melbourne Mavericks	72 – 71	Sunshine Coast Lightning	MyState Bank Arena
7:00pm AEST	2 Goal Shots; Eleanor Cardwell 4/5 (80%); Gabrielle Sinclair 2/2 (100%); 1 Goal Shots; Shimona Jok 42/43 (98%); Eleanor Cardwell 17/17 (100%); Gabrielle Sinclair 1/1 (100%)	Report; Stats	2 Goal Shots; Steph Fretwell 5/9 (56%); Reilley Batcheldor 2/3 (67%); 1 Goal Shots; Cara Koenen 39/42 (93%); Steph Fretwell 16/17 (94%); Reilley Batcheldor 2/2 (100%)	Attendance: 2,390

Sunday 30 June	New South Wales Swifts	60 – 61	Queensland Firebirds	Ken Rosewall Arena
2:00pm AEST	2 Goal Shots; Helen Housby 3/6 (50%); Uneeq Palavi 2/6 (33%); Sophie Fawns 1/4 (25%); 1 Goal Shots; Uneeq Palavi 35/37 (95%); Helen Housby 11/13 (85%); Sophie Fawns 2/3 (67%)	Report; Stats	2 Goal Shots; Tippah Dwan 7/12 (58%); Emily Moore 5/7 (71%); 1 Goal Shots; Tippah Dwan 24/29 (83%); Emily Moore 13/18 (72%)	Attendance: 8,095

Sunday 30 June	West Coast Fever	68 – 65	Giants Netball	RAC Arena
2:00pm AWST	2 Goal Shots; Shanice Beckford 1/3 (33%); Olivia Wilkinson 0/2 (0%); Jhaniele Fowler-Nembhard 0/3 (0%); 1 Goal Shots; Jhaniele Fowler-Nembhard 55/56 (98%); Shanice Beckford 7/8 (88%); Olivia Wilkinson 4/4 (100%)	Report; Stats	2 Goal Shots; Jo Harten 7/9 (78%); Sophie Dwyer 4/6 (67%); 1 Goal Shots; Jo Harten 28/30 (93%); Sophie Dwyer 15/17 (88%)	Attendance: 10,015

=== Round 13 - First Nations Round (Week 2) ===
Saturday 6 July	Giants Netball	54 – 55	Melbourne Mavericks	Ken Rosewall Arena
5:00pm AEST	2 Goal Shots; Sophie Dwyer 3/6 (50%); Matisse Letherbarrow 2/3 (67%); Jo Harten 0/2 (0%); 1 Goal Shots; Sophie Dwyer 18/22 (82%); Jo Harten 14/16 (88%); Matisse Letherbarrow 12/12 (100%)	Report; Stats	2 Goal Shots; Eleanor Cardwell 2/3 (67%); Gabrielle Sinclair 0/2 (0%); 1 Goal Shots; Shimona Jok 34/35 (97%); Eleanor Cardwell 17/21 (81%)	Attendance: 5,149

Saturday 6 July	Queensland Firebirds	67 – 83	Sunshine Coast Lightning	Nissan Arena
7:00pm AEST	2 Goal Shots; Emily Moore 7/9 (78%); Tippah Dwan 5/7 (71%); Donnell Wallam 1/7 (14%); 1 Goal Shots; Donnell Wallam 30/36 (83%); Tippah Dwan 6/9 (67%); Emily Moore 5/6 (83%)	Report; Stats	2 Goal Shots; Reilley Batcheldor 4/5 (80%); Steph Fretwell 4/6 (67%); 1 Goal Shots; Cara Koenen 55/60 (92%); Steph Fretwell 11/11 (100%); Reilley Batcheldor 1/1 (100%)	Attendance: 4,788

Sunday 7 July	Melbourne Vixens	67 – 68	West Coast Fever	John Cain Arena
2:00pm AEST	2 Goal Shots; Lily Graham 6/9 (67%); Kiera Austin 2/6 (33%); 1 Goal Shots; Kiera Austin 23/27 (85%); Sophie Garbin 17/19 (89%); Lily Graham 11/16 (69%)	Report; Stats	2 Goal Shots; Shanice Beckford 1/2 (50%); Olivia Wilkinson 0/1 (0%); 1 Goal Shots; Jhaniele Fowler-Nembhard 60/61 (98%); Shanice Beckford 4/8 (50%); Olivia Wilkinson 2/2 (100%)	Attendance: 9,035

Sunday 7 July	New South Wales Swifts	48 – 60	Adelaide Thunderbirds	Ken Rosewall Arena
4:00pm AEST	2 Goal Shots; Sophie Fawns 3/9 (33%); Helen Housby 2/6 (33%); Uneeq Palavi 0/1 (0%); 1 Goal Shots; Helen Housby 14/17 (82%); Sophie Fawns 14/19 (74%); Uneeq Palavi 10/13 (77%)	Report; Stats	2 Goal Shots; Lucy Austin 0/1 (0%); 1 Goal Shots; Romelda Aiken-George 43/46 (93%); Lauren Frew 10/11 (91%); Georgie Horjus 5/8 (63%); Lucy Austin 2/2 (100%)	Attendance: 7,409

=== Round 14 ===
Saturday 13 July	Queensland Firebirds	52 – 62	Melbourne Vixens	Nissan Arena
5:00pm AEST	2 Goal Shots; Donnell Wallam 7/14 (50%); Tippah Dwan 0/1 (0%); Emily Moore 0/2 (0%); 1 Goal Shots; Donnell Wallam 34/40 (85%); Tippah Dwan 3/7 (43%); Emily Moore 1/1 (100%)	Report; Stats	2 Goal Shots; Kiera Austin 0/3 (0%); 1 Goal Shots; Sophie Garbin 38/39 (97%); Kiera Austin 24/26 (92%)	Attendance: 4,619

Saturday 13 July	West Coast Fever	76 – 57	Melbourne Mavericks	RAC Arena
5:00pm AWST	2 Goal Shots; Alice Teague-Neeld 2/4 (50%); Jhaniele Fowler-Nembhard 1/1 (100%); 1 Goal Shots; Jhaniele Fowler-Nembhard 67/68 (99%); Shanice Beckford 2/3 (67%); Alice Teague-Neeld 1/2 (50%)	Report; Stats	2 Goal Shots; Eleanor Cardwell 3/7 (43%); Gabrielle Sinclair 2/5 (40%); Shimona Jok 0/1 (0%); 1 Goal Shots; Shimona Jok 30/33 (91%); Eleanor Cardwell 15/17 (88%); Gabrielle Sinclair 2/3 (67%)	Attendance: 11,841

Sunday 14 July	Giants Netball	71 – 72	New South Wales Swifts	Ken Rosewall Arena
2:00pm AEST	2 Goal Shots; Sophie Dwyer 5/10 (50%); Jo Harten 5/11 (45%); 1 Goal Shots; Jo Harten 36/37 (97%); Sophie Dwyer 15/15 (100%)	Report; Stats	2 Goal Shots; Helen Housby 6/7 (86%); Uneeq Palavi 1/3 (33%); Sophie Fawns 0/3 (0%); 1 Goal Shots; Uneeq Palavi 43/45 (96%); Helen Housby 13/14 (93%); Sophie Fawns 2/2 (100%)	Attendance: 9,018

Sunday 14 July	Adelaide Thunderbirds	64 – 62	Sunshine Coast Lightning	Adelaide Entertainment Centre
3:30pm ACST	2 Goal Shots; Georgie Horjus 4/4 (100%); 1 Goal Shots; Romelda Aiken-George 44/51 (86%); Georgie Horjus 10/14 (71%); Lauren Frew 2/2 (100%)	Report; Stats	2 Goal Shots; Steph Fretwell 9/12 (75%); 1 Goal Shots; Cara Koenen 24/27 (89%); Steph Fretwell 20/24 (83%)	Attendance: 9,248

== Ladder ==
2024 Suncorp Super Netball ladder
Pos	Team	P	W	D	L	GF	GA	%	PTS
1	Adelaide Thunderbirds	14	11	0	3	849	701	121.11	44
2	Melbourne Vixens	14	11	0	3	917	822	111.56	44
3	West Coast Fever	14	11	0	3	1006	906	111.04	44
4	Sunshine Coast Lightning	14	6	0	8	957	944	101.38	24
5	Melbourne Mavericks	14	6	0	8	829	919	90.21	24
6	New South Wales Swifts	14	4	0	10	856	923	92.74	16
7	Queensland Firebirds	14	4	0	10	878	970	90.52	16
8	Giants Netball	14	3	0	11	853	960	88.85	12
Last updated: Sunday 14 July 2024 — Source

== Finals Series ==
=== Major Semi Final ===
Saturday 20 July; 4:30pm ACST	Report; Stats	Adelaide Thunderbirds (1)	68–43	Melbourne Vixens (2)	Adelaide 36ers Arena; Attendance: 6,651; Umpires: Georgina Sulley-Beales, Rachael Ayre; Reserve umpire: Bronwen Adams	Foxtel, Kayo Sports
Saturday 20 July; 4:30pm ACST	Report; Stats	Scoring by quarter: 19-13, 19-9, 16-10, 14-11			Adelaide 36ers Arena; Attendance: 6,651; Umpires: Georgina Sulley-Beales, Rachael Ayre; Reserve umpire: Bronwen Adams	Foxtel, Kayo Sports
Saturday 20 July; 4:30pm ACST	Report; Stats	Scoring by half: 38-22, 30-21			Adelaide 36ers Arena; Attendance: 6,651; Umpires: Georgina Sulley-Beales, Rachael Ayre; Reserve umpire: Bronwen Adams	Foxtel, Kayo Sports
Saturday 20 July; 4:30pm ACST	Report; Stats	2 Goal Shots; Lauren Frew 1/2 (50%); Lucy Austin 1/3 (33%); Georgie Horjus 0/1 (0%); 1 Goal Shots; Romelda Aiken-George 39/44 (89%); Lauren Frew 16/16 (100%); Lucy Austin 8/8 (100%); Georgie Horjus 1/2 (50%)		2 Goal Shots; Kiera Austin 4/7 (57%); Lily Graham 3/7 (43%); 1 Goal Shots; Sophie Garbin 15/19 (79%); Kiera Austin 8/12 (67%); Lily Graham 6/6 (100%)	Adelaide 36ers Arena; Attendance: 6,651; Umpires: Georgina Sulley-Beales, Rachael Ayre; Reserve umpire: Bronwen Adams	Foxtel, Kayo Sports

=== Minor Semi Final ===
Sunday 21 July; 12:00pm AWST	Report; Stats	West Coast Fever (3)	72–62	Sunshine Coast Lightning (4)	RAC Arena; Attendance: 10,023; Umpires: Tamara Welsford, Josh Bowring; Reserve umpire: Tayla Favell	Foxtel, Kayo Sports
Sunday 21 July; 12:00pm AWST	Report; Stats	Scoring by quarter: 16-18, 20-17, 18-12, 18-15			RAC Arena; Attendance: 10,023; Umpires: Tamara Welsford, Josh Bowring; Reserve umpire: Tayla Favell	Foxtel, Kayo Sports
Sunday 21 July; 12:00pm AWST	Report; Stats	Scoring by half: 36-35, 36-27			RAC Arena; Attendance: 10,023; Umpires: Tamara Welsford, Josh Bowring; Reserve umpire: Tayla Favell	Foxtel, Kayo Sports
Sunday 21 July; 12:00pm AWST	Report; Stats	2 Goal Shots; Shanice Beckford 1/3 (33%); Jhaniele Fowler-Nembhard 0/2 (0%); 1 Goal Shots; Jhaniele Fowler-Nembhard 67/67 (100%); Shanice Beckford 3/4 (75%)		2 Goal Shots; Reilley Batcheldor 6/12 (50%); Steph Fretwell 2/9 (22%); 1 Goal Shots; Cara Koenen 29/34 (85%); Steph Fretwell 15/19 (79%); Reilley Batcheldor 2/3 (67%)	RAC Arena; Attendance: 10,023; Umpires: Tamara Welsford, Josh Bowring; Reserve umpire: Tayla Favell	Foxtel, Kayo Sports

=== Preliminary Final ===
Saturday 27 July; 5:00pm AEST	Report; Stats	Melbourne Vixens (2)	73–72	West Coast Fever (3)	John Cain Arena; Attendance: 8,058; Umpires: Rachael Ayre, Josh Bowring; Reserve umpire: Tamara Welsford	Foxtel, Kayo Sports
Saturday 27 July; 5:00pm AEST	Report; Stats	Scoring by quarter: 18-19, 19-19, 20-14, 16-20			John Cain Arena; Attendance: 8,058; Umpires: Rachael Ayre, Josh Bowring; Reserve umpire: Tamara Welsford	Foxtel, Kayo Sports
Saturday 27 July; 5:00pm AEST	Report; Stats	Scoring by half: 37-38, 36-34			John Cain Arena; Attendance: 8,058; Umpires: Rachael Ayre, Josh Bowring; Reserve umpire: Tamara Welsford	Foxtel, Kayo Sports
Saturday 27 July; 5:00pm AEST	Report; Stats	2 Goal Shots; Kiera Austin 4/5 (80%); Sophie Garbin 2/2 (100%); 1 Goal Shots; Sophie Garbin 36/38 (95%); Kiera Austin 25/27 (93%)		2 Goal Shots; Jhaniele Fowler-Nembhard 4/7 (57%); Alice Teague-Neeld 3/4 (75%); Shanice Beckford 1/2 (50%); 1 Goal Shots; Jhaniele Fowler-Nembhard 52/54 (96%); Alice Teague-Neeld 2/2 (100%); Shanice Beckford 2/2 (100%)	John Cain Arena; Attendance: 8,058; Umpires: Rachael Ayre, Josh Bowring; Reserve umpire: Tamara Welsford	Foxtel, Kayo Sports

=== Grand Final ===
Saturday 3 August; 6:30pm ACST	Report; Stats	Adelaide Thunderbirds (1)	59–57	Melbourne Vixens (2)	Adelaide Entertainment Centre; Attendance: 9,649; Umpires: Rachael Ayre, Josh Bowring; Reserve umpire: Tamara Welsford	Foxtel, Kayo Sports
Saturday 3 August; 6:30pm ACST	Report; Stats	Scoring by quarter: 13-16, 15-12, 14-13, 17-16			Adelaide Entertainment Centre; Attendance: 9,649; Umpires: Rachael Ayre, Josh Bowring; Reserve umpire: Tamara Welsford	Foxtel, Kayo Sports
Saturday 3 August; 6:30pm ACST	Report; Stats	Scoring by half: 28-28, 31-29			Adelaide Entertainment Centre; Attendance: 9,649; Umpires: Rachael Ayre, Josh Bowring; Reserve umpire: Tamara Welsford	Foxtel, Kayo Sports
Saturday 3 August; 6:30pm ACST	Report; Stats	1 Goal Shots; Romelda Aiken-George 42/51 (82%); Lauren Frew 10/10 (100%); Georgie Horjus 7/8 (88%)		2 Goal Shots; Kiera Austin 7/7 (100%); Sophie Garbin 0/1 (0%); 1 Goal Shots; Sophie Garbin 22/24 (92%); Kiera Austin 21/24 (88%)	Adelaide Entertainment Centre; Attendance: 9,649; Umpires: Rachael Ayre, Josh Bowring; Reserve umpire: Tamara Welsford	Foxtel, Kayo Sports
Saturday 3 August; 6:30pm ACST	Report; Stats	Grand Final MVP: Romelda Aiken-George			Adelaide Entertainment Centre; Attendance: 9,649; Umpires: Rachael Ayre, Josh Bowring; Reserve umpire: Tamara Welsford	Foxtel, Kayo Sports

== Awards ==
The following players, coaches and umpires were awarded by Netball Australia for performances in the 2024 season:

- The Player of the Year Award was won by Georgie Horjus of the Adelaide Thunderbirds.
- The Grand Final MVP Award was won by Romelda Aiken-George of the Adelaide Thunderbirds.
- The Rookie of the Year Award was won by Lauren Frew of the Adelaide Thunderbirds.
- The Joyce Brown Coach of the Year award was won by Tania Obst of the Adelaide Thunderbirds.
- The Lorna McConchie Umpire of the Year award was won by Josh Bowring of Victoria.
- The Leading Goalscorer Award was won by Jhaniele Fowler-Nembhard of the West Coast Fever, who scored 813 goals in the regular season.
- The inaugural Australian Netball Players' Association (ANPA) Heart of the Game Award was won by Amy Parmenter of the Melbourne Mavericks.
- The following players were named in the Super Netball Team of the Year:

Attackers

- Goal Shooter: Jhaniele Fowler-Nembhard
  (West Coast Fever)
- Goal Attack: Kiera Austin
  (Melbourne Vixens)

Midcourters

- Wing Attack: Georgie Horjus
  (Adelaide Thunderbirds)
- Centre: Kate Moloney
  (Melbourne Vixens)
- Wing Defence: Latanya Wilson
  (Adelaide Thunderbirds)

Defenders

- Goal Defence: Sunday Aryang
  (West Coast Fever)
- Goal Keeper: Shamera Sterling-Humphrey
  (Adelaide Thunderbirds)

Reserves

- Attack Reserve: Sophie Garbin
  (Melbourne Vixens)
- Midcourt Reserve: Liz Watson
  (Sunshine Coast Lightning)
- Defence Reserve: Ashleigh Ervin
  (Sunshine Coast Lightning)
