= Melbourne Mavericks =

Australian professional netball team

- Founded: 2023
- Based in: Melbourne
- Regions: Victoria
- Home venue: John Cain Arena
- Head coach: Gerard Murphy
- Asst coach: Nicole Richardson
- Captain: Amy Parmenter
- Premierships: Nil
- League: Super Netball
- 2026 placing: 4th
- Website: melbournemavericks.com
Playing dress

Melbourne Mavericks is an Australian professional netball team who have competed in Super Netball since the 2024 season. The club is operated by the Sports Entertainment Group (SEG) and is based at the Melbourne Sports and Aquatic Centre in Albert Park, Victoria.

The Mavericks hold the SSN licence made vacant by the Collingwood Magpies, who folded and withdrew from the league at the conclusion of the 2023 season.

== History ==
Following the demise of the Collingwood Magpies, speculation circled as to who would be awarded the eighth licence for the 2024 Super Netball season and beyond. Submissions for the new licence closed on 20 June 2023, with as many as six initial bids being whittled down to two by the closing date, according to media reports.

On 21 July 2023, the league announced that the Sports Entertainment Group (SEG), led by chief executive Craig Hutchison, was awarded the licence for a team to be based in south-east Melbourne. As part of the licensing agreement, Netball Australia will operate the team for the rest of 2023 before transitioning to SEG for 2024 and beyond. ABC News reported that the SEG bid was preferred by broadcasters Fox Netball over the alternate bid put forward by Netball Victoria, which suggested a regional team 'floating' between Geelong, Bendigo or Ballarat.

On 2 August 2023, decorated English netball coach Tracey Neville was announced as the inaugural head coach of the then-unnamed Mavericks.

The identity of the Mavericks was officially announced by netball operations general manager Shae Bolton-Brown on 20 September 2023, with the club's name, logo and primary colours—sky blue, 'pacific cyan' and sapphire—revealed after months of speculation.

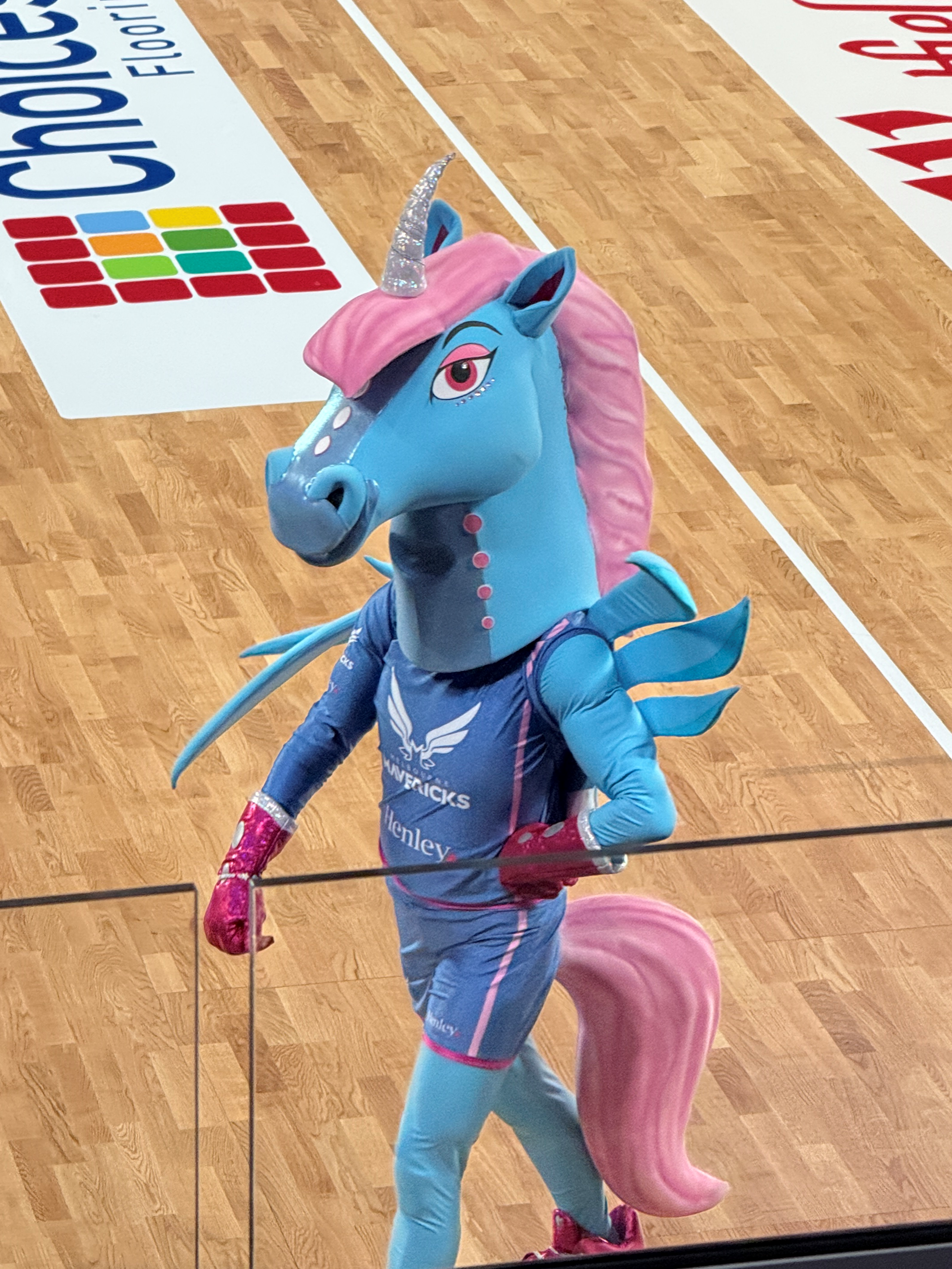
Mavericks mascot "Goose" is a unicorn with sparkly pink hair

In their debut season, Neville guided Mavericks to a fifth place finish, just missing out on the finals on goal average. This was despite Lauren Moore and Sasha Glasgow suffering season ending injuries before round one.

The club reached its first finals campaign in 2026, after finishing fourth in Gerard Murphy's first season as coach. The Mavericks lost in the elimination final 56-52 to West Coast Fever in Perth.

Regular season statistics
Season	Position	Won	Drawn	Lost
2024	5th	6	0	8
2025	7th	4	0	10
2026	4th	9	0	5

== Location and home venues ==
The Mavericks play all of their Melbourne-based home games at John Cain Arena in Melbourne Park. The Mavericks played one home game each season in 2024 and 2025 at the Derwent Entertainment Centre in Hobart, Tasmania. In the 2026 season, the Hobart game was replaced by a home game at RedEnergy Arena in Bendigo.

The team was initially announced as being representative of 'south-east Melbourne' without a specific location named. In October 2023, SEG confirmed that the club's administration and training base would be located at the Waverley Netball Centre in Glen Waverley, Victoria. Preceding the 2026 season, the club relocated the administration and training base to the Melbourne Sports and Aquatic Centre in Albert Park.

== Notable players ==
=== 2027 squad ===
2027 Melbourne Mavericks roster
Players
Coaching staff

Nat.	Name	Position(s)	DoB	Height
(Australia)	Reilley Batcheldor	GA, GS	14 May 2002 (age 24)	1.87 m (6 ft 2 in)
(Australia)	Kim Brown	GD, GK	27 February 1998 (age 28)	1.85 m (6 ft 1 in)
(Australia)	Jessie Grenvold	GD, GK	26 April 2003 (age 23)	1.85 m (6 ft 1 in)
(Australia)	Tara Hinchliffe	GK, GD	25 May 1998 (age 28)	1.85 m (6 ft 1 in)
(Australia)	Sacha McDonald	GA, GS	24 January 2000 (age 26)	1.80 m (5 ft 11 in)
(Jamaica)	Shimona Nelson	GS	1 December 1998 (age 27)	1.95 m (6 ft 5 in)
(Australia)	Tyler Orr	C, WA	21 January 2000 (age 26)	1.79 m (5 ft 10 in)
(Australia)	Amy Parmenter	WD, C	1 August 1997 (age 29)	1.76 m (5 ft 9 in)
(Australia)	Jamie-Lee Price	C, WD	10 January 1996 (age 30)	1.79 m (5 ft 10 in)
(Australia)	Zara Walters	WA, C	23 October 2003 (age 23)	1.76 m (5 ft 9 in)

Head coach

- (Australia) Gerard Murphy

Assistant coaches

- (Australia) Nicole Richardson

Notes

- (c) – Captain
- (cc) – Co-captain
- (vc) – Vice-captain
- – Injury / maternity leave
- (TRP) – Temporary Replacement Player
Player profiles: Team website
Last updated: 23 October 2026

=== Internationals ===
Australia

- Jessie Grenvold
- Tara Hinchliffe
- Amy Parmenter
- Jamie Lee-Price

England

- Eleanor Cardwell
- Sasha Glasgow

Jamaica

- Shimona Nelson

South Africa

- Rolene Streutker

Tonga

- Uneeq Palavi

=== Captains ===
Captain	Years
Amy Parmenter	2024–present

== Club Award winners ==
Club Champion

Season	Winner	Runner-up	Third place
2024	Shimona Jok	Kim Jenner	Amy Parmenter
2025	Molly Jovic	Amy Parmenter	Shimona Jok
2026	Jamie-Lee Price	Jessie Grenvold	Amy Parmenter

Wing Woman of the Year (Players' Player)

Season	Player
2025	Molly Jovic
2026	Jessie Grenvold

Coaches' Award

Season	Player
2024	Amy Parmenter
2025	Tayla Fraser
2026	Reilley Batcheldor

== Competition Award winners ==
Super Netball Team of the Year

Season	Player	Position
2026	Jamie-Lee Price	C
2026	Shimona Nelson	Reserve

Australian Netball Players' Association (ANPA) Awards

Season	Player	Award
2024	Amy Parmenter	Heart of the Game
2026	Jessie Grenvold	Defender of the Year

== Head coaches ==
Coach	Years
Tracey Neville	2024–2025
Gerard Murphy	2026–present

== Melbourne Mavericks Reserves ==
The reserve team of the Melbourne Mavericks is known as the Melbourne Mavericks Reserves. This team currently plays in the Super Netball Reserves competition, which began in 2024, after rebranding from the Australian Netball Championships and prior to that, the Australian Netball League.
