= Tara Hinchliffe =

Australian netball player (born 1998)

Personal information
- Born: 25 May 1998 (age 28) Brisbane, Queensland, Australia
- Height: 1.85 m (6 ft 1 in)
- School: Hillbrook Anglican School

Netball career
- Playing positions: GD, GK
Years	Club team	Apps
2018–2021	Queensland Firebirds	
2022-2025	Sunshine Coast Lightning	43
2026-	Melbourne Mavericks	1
Years	National team	Caps
2023	Australia	1

Tara Hinchliffe (born 25 May 1998) is an Australian netball player in the Suncorp Super Netball league, playing for the Melbourne Mavericks. She also serves as the vice-president of the Australian Netball Players’ Association.

Hinchliffe was signed by the Firebirds in June 2017, having previously been captain and MVP of the Queensland under 19 side at that year's Australian National Netball Championships. She was also selected in the Australian side to compete at the World Youth Cup, making her a significant acquisition for the Firebirds. Hinchliffe grew up a passionate supporter of the Firebirds, idolising fellow players Laura Geitz and Gabi Simpson. She made her debut as a senior contracted player in the first round of the 2018 season. Later that year she represented Australia in the Fast5 World Series, winning a bronze medal with the team.

Hinchliffe was signed by the Sunshine Coast Lightning in September 2021 for the 2022 Suncorp Super Netball season. In 2023, Hinchliffe was named vice-captain of the Lightning, though an ACL rupture caused her to miss the entirety of the 2023 Suncorp Super Netball season. She returned in 2024, and was named Community Champion in the club's year-end awards.

In January 2023, Hinchliffe made her international netball debut for Australia in the 2023 Netball Quad Series match against South Africa.

In August 2025, the Melbourne Mavericks announced their signing of Hinchliffe for the 2026 Suncorp Super Netball season, where she would reunite with her former Queensland Firebirds defensive partner, Kim Jenner.
