= Kim Jenner =

Australian netball player (born 1998)

Kim Brown
Personal information
- Full name: Kim Brown (née Jenner)
- Born: 27 February 1998 (age 28) Townsville, Queensland
- Height: 1.84 m (6 ft 0 in)
- School: Pimlico State High School

Netball career
- Playing positions: GD, GK
Years	Club team	Apps
2017–2022	Queensland Firebirds	
2023	West Coast Fever	
2024-	Melbourne Mavericks	

Kim Brown (née Jenner) (born 27 February 1998) is an Australian netball player in the Suncorp Super Netball league, playing for the Melbourne Mavericks, for which she also serves as the club's Australian Netball Players’ Association delegate.

Brown made her debut for the Firebirds in 2017 as a training partner, before being signed by the team permanently ahead of the 2018 season. She won a spot in the starting seven for the first time that season in a match against the Giants, playing goal defence alongside prominent goal keeper Laura Geitz. She established herself as integral player at the Firebirds that season, earning a call up to join the Australian Diamonds as a training partner prior to the September Quad Series and winning a bronze medal with the Australian Fast5 team at the end-of-year World Series event. Brown was selected in the Australian squad for the 2021 Constellation Cup, which was played in New Zealand.

Ahead of the 2023 Suncorp Super Netball season, Brown was signed by the West Coast Fever as a replacement for the retiring circle defender Stacey Francis-Bayman.

In late 2023, Brown was signed in the inaugural squad of the new Melbourne Mavericks franchise, as their starting goal defence. Brown was re-signed in 2025 for two seasons, being described by Mavericks general-manager Shae Bolton-Brown as "a cornerstone of our defence".

Brown grew up in Townsville and attended Pimlico State High. Off the court she has graduated from studying a Bachelor of Health, Sport & Physical Education degree at The University of Queensland, as well as coaching young netballers.
