= Amy Parmenter =

Australian netball player

Personal information
- Born: 1 August 1997 (age 28) Sydney, New South Wales
- Height: 1.76 m (5 ft 9 in)
- School: SCEGGS Darlinghurst
- University: University of Technology Sydney

Netball career
- Playing positions: WD, C
Years	Club team	Apps
2019–2023	Giants Netball	
2024–	Melbourne Mavericks	

Amy Parmenter (born 1 August 1997) is an Australian netball player in the Suncorp Super Netball league, playing as the Captain for Melbourne Mavericks, for which she also serves as the club's Australian Netball Players’ Association delegate.

Parmenter was elevated to the Giants senior ahead of the 2019 season, having been a training partner with Canberra Giants in the Australian Netball League for the previous two years. Before her time in the ANL, Parmenter represented Netball New South Wales and Australia at under 17/19 levels. Parmenter had an outstanding debut season at the Giants, recording the most intercepts of any midcourter in the competition and ending the year by being awarded the Rising Star award.

== Personal life ==
Parmenter grew up in Sydney’s eastern suburbs and played junior netball for Randwick Rugby Netball Club in the Randwick Netball Association.

She attended school at SCEGGS Darlinghurst. After leaving school she studied for a law and communications double degree at University of Technology Sydney.

She has English heritage from her late mother who was originally from England.
