= Lauren Moore =

Australian netball player

Lauren Parkinson
Personal information
- Born: 30 January 1998 (age 28) Wyong, New South Wales, Australia
- Height: 1.84 m (6 ft 0 in)
- School: St Peter's Catholic College, Tuggerah

Netball career
- Playing positions: GK, GD
Years	Club team	Apps
2016–2021	New South Wales Swifts	
2022-2023	Giants Netball	
2024	Melbourne Mavericks	

Lauren Moore (born 30 January 1998) is an Australian netball player in the Suncorp Super Netball league, playing for Melbourne Mavericks.

Moore began playing for the Swifts in 2016, having been signed by the club at the end of the previous year at 17 years of age and whilst still in school. Moore played at both a state and national level as an under-17 player. She was relegated to a training partner position in the 2017 and 2018 seasons before reclaiming a full-time position at the Swifts ahead of the 2019 season. Ahead of the 2022 SSN season, Moore announced her departure from the Swifts and made the move to GIANTS netball, also a Sydney based team. A successful 2 years playing in GD, WD and GK resulted in the versatile defender being dubbed ‘intercept queen’, a nickname of which she was deserving. Ahead of the 2024 season, Moore made the move to the newly established Melbourne Mavericks to be taken under the wing of former England Roses head coach, Tracy Neville. A successful early campaign showed the Mavericks compete in a series of preseason matches against the GIANTS, her former side, in which her new side took a win and a loss. Devastatingly, after an excellent start to the Suncorp Team Girls Cup, Lauren Moore has now been ruled out for the season with a confirmed ACL rupture occurring in the final round of the tournament. The star defender is confident that she will make a strong return and looks ahead to the remainder of her career.
