= Shae Bolton-Brown =

Australian netball player (born 1989)

Personal information
- Full name: Shae Bolton-Brown
- Born: 28 June 1989 (age 37) Melbourne, Australia
- Height: 1.81 m (5 ft 11 1/2 in)
- Relatives: Mark Bolton (uncle); Mitch Brown (husband)
- School: Avila College
- University: Edith Cowan University

Netball career
- Playing positions: C, WD, WA, GA
| Years | Club team | Apps |
| 2006–2007 | Melbourne Kestrels | |
| 2009–2016 | West Coast Fever | |
| 2017–2018 | Collingwood Magpies | |
- Updated on 2018-12-12

Shae Bolton-Brown (née Bolton, formerly Shae Brown; born 28 June 1989 in Melbourne, Australia) is a former Australian netball player.

Bolton-Brown's domestic career began with the Melbourne Kestrels in the Commonwealth Bank Trophy in 2006. She moved to the West Coast Fever in 2008, a team she played for in the ANZ Championship for close to a decade. From 2017 onwards she played for the Collingwood Magpies in the Suncorp Super Netball league. Bolton-Brown announced her retirement from professional netball at the end of the 2018 season.

Both her uncle, Mark Bolton, and her former husband, Mitch Brown, have played professional Australian rules football. Bolton-Brown played for the Australian Fast5 team in the 2012 Fast5 Netball World Series where she spent time playing Goal Attack.

Bolton-Brown joined the Melbourne Mavericks as head of netball operations in August 2023.
