= Molly Jovic =

Australian netball player

Personal information
- Full name: Molly Jovic
- Born: 7 October 1995 (age 30)
- Height: 1.72 m (5 ft 8 in)
- School: Wesley College
- University: Monash University

Netball career
- Playing positions: C, WA, WD
Years	Club team	Apps
2020–2023	Collingwood Magpies	
2024 -	Melbourne Mavericks	

Molly Jovic (born 7 October 1995) is an Australian netball player in the Suncorp Super Netball league, playing for the Melbourne Mavericks, she previously played for Collingwood Magpies.

== Early life ==
Jovic grew up in Williamstown and first played netball for Williamstown Junior Netball Club in the Altona Netball Association. She attended high school at Wesley College and was part of their firsts netball team from year 8 through to year 12. She later played for St Joseph’s in the Geelong Football Netball League.

== Career ==
Jovic was signed by the Collingwood Magpies as one of ten senior-contracted players ahead of the 2020 season, signed as a replacement for the long-term injured Ashleigh Brazill. Jovic's netball career grew out of appearances for the Victorian Fury (2017–18) and Tasmanian Magpies (2019) in the second-tier Australian Netball League. She was also named in 2019 Victorian Netball League Championship Team of the Year.
