= Giants Netball =

Australian netball team

GIANTS Netball
- Founded: 2016
- Based in: Greater Western Sydney
- Regions: New South Wales
- Home venue: Ken Rosewall Arena
- Head coach: Nerida Stewart
- Asst coach: Jen Wright
- Captain: Whitney Souness
- Premierships: Nil
- League: Super Netball
- 2026 placing: 8th
- Website: www.giantsnetball.com.au
Playing dress	Alternate

GWS Giants departments
Australian rules football (men's)	Australian rules football (women's)	Netball (women's)

Giants Netball (stylised as GIANTS Netball) are an Australian professional netball team based in Greater Western Sydney, New South Wales. Since 2017 they have played in Super Netball. The team was formed in 2016 as a joint venture between Netball New South Wales and Greater Western Sydney Giants.

GIANTS have played in two grand finals (2017, 2021) and have won two minor premierships (2018, 2021).

== History ==
=== New franchise ===
In May 2016, Netball Australia and Netball New Zealand announced that the ANZ Championship would be discontinued after the 2016 season. In Australia it was replaced by Super Netball. The founding members of Super Netball included the five former Australian ANZ Championship teams – Adelaide Thunderbirds, Melbourne Vixens, New South Wales Swifts, Queensland Firebirds and West Coast Fever; plus three brand new franchises: Collingwood Magpies, Sunshine Coast Lightning and GIANTS Netball. The GIANTS were formed as a joint venture or "strategic alliance" between Netball New South Wales and Greater Western Sydney Giants and were officially launched in September 2016.

=== Julie Fitzgerald era ===
In August 2016, Julie Fitzgerald was announced as the inaugural head coach of Netball New South Wales's new franchise. Two veteran New South Wales Swifts players, Kimberlee Green and Susan Pettitt, subsequently switched to the GIANTS. Green was named the inaugural GIANTS captain. The GIANTS went onto finish the 2017 season as runners-up after losing 65–48 to Sunshine Coast Lightning in the grand final.

In 2018, Fitzgerald guided the GIANTS to the minor premiership. However, in the final series they lost out to both West Coast Fever and Sunshine Coast Lightning. In 2021, Fitzgerald guided the GIANTS to a both a second minor premiership and a second grand final. However, in the grand final they lost out to New South Wales Swifts.

Regular season statistics
Season	Position	Won	Drawn	Lost
2017	3rd	10	0	4
2018	1st	10	1	3
2019	5th	7	1	6
2020	6th	5	2	7
2021	1st	9	0	5
2022	3rd	8	0	6
2023	6th	5	0	9
2024	8th	3	0	11
2025	6th	5	0	9
2026	8th	1	0	13

Runners Up

=== New ownership ===
In August 2026, the team's license was acquired by Sports Entertainment Group. The new ownership confirmed the team's name and branding would change. The new franchise was renamed Sydney Sirens.

== Grand finals ==
Season	Winners	Score	Runners up	Venue
2017	Sunshine Coast Lightning	65–48	GIANTS Netball	Brisbane Entertainment Centre
2021	New South Wales Swifts	63–59	GIANTS Netball	Nissan Arena

== Home venues ==
As of 2021, the GIANTS have played all of their home games at Ken Rosewall Arena in Sydney Olympic Park. The GIANTS have previously played home games at Sydney Olympic Park Sports Centre, Qudos Bank Arena and the International Convention Centre in Sydney and the AIS Arena in Canberra.

The club's administration and training base is shared with the NSW Swifts and Netball NSW at Netball Central in Sydney Olympic Park.

== Notable players ==
=== 2026 squad ===
2026 GIANTS Netball roster
Players
Coaching staff

Nat.	Name	Position(s)	DoB	Height
(New Zealand)	Whitney Souness (c)	WA, C	12 October 1995 (age 31)	1.74 m (5 ft 9 in)
(Australia)	Casey Adamson	C, WD	25 November 1997 (age 28)	1.78 m (5 ft 10 in)
(Australia)	Lucy Austin (Note: Injured, out for the season with foot fracture) (injured)	GS, GA	20 December 2001 (age 24)	1.9 m (6 ft 3 in)
(Australia)	Sophie Dwyer	GA, GS	5 December 2001 (age 24)	1.83 m (6 ft 0 in)
(Australia)	Matisse Letherbarrow	GS, GA	7 January 2002 (age 24)	1.88 m (6 ft 2 in)
(Australia)	Erin O'Brien	GK, GD	8 July 2003 (age 23)	1.9 m (6 ft 3 in)
(Australia)	Amy Sligar (vc)	WD, C	13 March 2002 (age 24)	1.75 m (5 ft 9 in)
(Australia)	Skye Thompson (Note: Season-long permanent replacement for injured Lucy Austin) (TRP)	GS, GA	27 January 2007 (age 19)	1.76 m (5 ft 9 in)
(Jamaica)	Jodi-Ann Ward	GD, WD	1 September 1994 (age 32)	1.78 m (5 ft 10 in)
(New Zealand)	Jane Watson	GK, GD	7 March 1990 (age 36)	1.81 m (5 ft 11 in)
(Australia)	Hope White	WA, C	19 October 2006 (age 20)	1.74 m (5 ft 9 in)

Head coach

- (Australia) Nerida Stewart

Assistant coaches

- (Australia) Jen Wright

Notes

- (c) – Captain
- (cc) – Co-captain
- (vc) – Vice-captain
- – Injury / maternity leave
- (TRP) – Temporary Replacement Player
Player profiles: Team website
Last updated: 10 June 2026

=== Internationals ===
Australia

- Kiera Austin
- Caitlin Bassett
- April Brandley
- Rebecca Bulley
- Sophie Dwyer
- Kimberlee Green
- Kristiana Manu'a
- Amy Parmenter
- Susan Pettitt
- Chelsea Pitman
- Jamie-Lee Price

England

- Serena Guthrie
- Jo Harten
- Chelsea Pitman

Jamaica

- Jodi-Ann Ward

New Zealand

- Gina Crampton
- Jane Watson

=== Captains ===
Captains	Years
Kimberlee Green	2016–2019
Jo Harten	2020–2023 (sole captain); 2024-2025 (co-captain)
Jamie-Lee Price	2024-2025 (co-captain)
Whitney Souness	2026

== Club Award winners ==
HCF Most Valuable Player

Season	Winner
2017	Serena Guthrie
2018	Jo Harten
2019	Jo Harten (2)
2020	Kiera Austin
2021	Jo Harten (3)
2022	Jo Harten (4)
2023	Jamie-Lee Price
2024	Jamie-Lee Price (2)
2025	Jamie-Lee Price (3)
2026	Sophie Dwyer

Players' Player

Season	Player
2017	Rebecca Bulley
2018	Jo Harten
2019	Samantha Poolman
2020	Kiera Austin
2021	April Brandley
2022	Jo Harten; Amy Parmenter
2023	Jamie-Lee Price
2024	Amy Sligar
2025	Erin O'Brien
2026	Erin O'Brien

Members' Player of the Year

Season	Player
2017	Jo Harten; Samantha Poolman
2018	Jo Harten
2019	Amy Parmenter
2020	Amy Parmenter
2021	Sophie Dwyer
2022	Jo Harten
2023	Jamie-Lee Price
2024	Jamie-Lee Price
2025	Amy Sligar
2026	Amy Sligar

== Competition Award winners ==
Super Netball Rookie of the Year

Season	Player
2019	Amy Parmenter
2021	Sophie Dwyer

Super Netball Team of the Year

Season	Player	Position
2017	Serena Guthrie	Reserve
2017	Rebecca Bulley	Reserve
2018	Serena Guthrie	C
2018	Jo Harten	Reserve
2018	Kimberlee Green	Reserve
2020	Kiera Austin	GA
2021	Jo Harten	GA
2021	Maddie Hay	WA
2021	Jamie-Lee Price	Reserve
2022	Amy Parmenter	WD
2022	Jo Harten	Reserve
2022	Jamie-Lee Price	C
2025	Amy Sligar	WD
2026	Sophie Dwyer	GA

== Head coaches ==
Coach	Years
Julie Fitzgerald	2016–2025
Nerida Stewart	2026

== GIANTS Netball Reserves ==
The reserve team of GIANTS Netball is known as the GIANTS Reserves, and previously played as the Canberra GIANTS and GIANTS Academy. This team currently plays in the Super Netball Reserves competition, which began in 2024, after rebranding from the Australian Netball Championships and prior to that, the Australian Netball League.

== Premierships ==
- Super Netball
  - Runners Up: 2017, 2021
  - Minor Premiership: 2018, 2021
- Super Netball Reserves / Australian Netball Championships / Australian Netball League
  - Runners Up: 2018
