= Uneeq Palavi =

Tongan Australian netballer

Uneeq Sokopeti Lisi Alena Palavi is a Tongan Australian netballer who has represented Tonga internationally.

Palavi was born in Melbourne, Australia to a Samoan mother and Tongan father. She played for the Werribee Centrals, the Victorian Fury, and the City West Falcons. In 2022 she was selected for the Collingwood Magpies in the Suncorp Super Netball competition.

She was selected for the Tonga national netball team for the 2019 Pacific Games in Apia. In 2022 she was selected for the team for the 2022 Pacific Australia Netball Series, where she shared the series MVP award with captain Hulita Veve and won the Grand Final MVP Medal. Later that year she was in the team for the 2023 Netball World Cup Oceania qualifiers, where she was top-scorer.

In June 2023 she was selected for the Tonga national netball team for the 2023 Netball World Cup. Palavi was the top scorer for Tonga, and the fourth top scorer overall, in that competition.

In June 2024, Palavi was selected as a Temporary Replacement Player for the New South Wales Swifts.
