= Australian Netball Players' Association =

ANPA
- Australian Netball Players' Association
- Location: Australia
- Key people: Jo Weston, President; Tara Hinchliffe, vice-president Kathryn Harby-Williams, chief executive officer
- Website: Australian Netball Players' Association

The Australian Netball Players' Association (ANPA) is an organisation that represents the professional netball players of Australia. The Association's aim is to act as a collective voice to promote the interests and protect the welfare of Australia's elite netballers, as well as provide education and support to those players.

== Current administration ==
Jo Weston is the current president of the ANPA and Tara Hinchliffe is the current vice-president. Geoff Parmenter is the current chairman, Kathryn Harby-Williams is the current chief executive officer, Treasurer and Secretary, while Natalie von Bertouch is the current Transition Manager. The remaining members of the ANPA's board are Hannah Petty, Jo Harten, Maddy Turner, Gabi Simpson, Sophie Garbin and Sasha Glasgow.

== History ==
In September 2021, the ANPA successfully negotiated a two-year pay deal which provided an increase in funding for training partners from $3,500 to $5,000 per year, increased the minimum salary for netballers by 17% from $36,667 to $43,000, as well as increasing the average maximum salary by 22% to $91,500, which ensured that Australia's netballers remain the highest-paid female athletes across any domestic league in Australia.

Beginning in February 2023, the ANPA and Netball Australia were engaged in a pay dispute, with the current collective bargaining agreement due to expire on 30 September 2023; the ANPA had demanded a greater revenue share, which Netball Australia argued wasn't possible and signalling that it did not intend to increase Super Netball player wages as part of a new agreement, citing the organisation being $4.2 million in debt and following losses of more than $7 million in the past two years. The ANPA is exploring a partnership model with Netball Australia in the hope that it will lead to an increase in player salaries.

The pay dispute led to Netball Australia delaying the announcement of the Australian squad to compete in the 2023 Netball World Cup, with Netball Australia claiming that the squad could not be picked until a new collective bargaining agreement was agreed to and contracts were signed. Netball Australia and the ANPA eventually signed an extension of the current Collective Playing Agreement, that will run past the tournament in South Africa, with this extension enabling for the squad to be selected.

On 30 August 2023, the ANPA accused Netball Australia of "weaponising" the looming pay deal deadline to pressure players into signing a new collective player agreement. The ANPA rejected three year and one-year deal offers from Netball Australia; the three-year deal, which would have provided players with private health insurance and a three per cent increase in base salary, was rejected on the basis that the deal ran a very severe risk of locking players into an unsatisfactory deal for a long time owing to a lack of clarity on the finances and uncertainty regarding a strategic direction for netball, and the one-year deal, which would have provided a two per cent increase in base salary, was rejected on the basis that it failed to include any 'upside' mechanism which allows player to share in extra revenue they help generate for the game. The ANPA is seeking better player payments and minimum wages, as well as revenue share, consultation and agreement protocols with players, improved parental and pregnancy policy and increased elite player opportunities.
