= List of Sunshine Coast Lightning players =

This article lists all netballers who have played Suncorp Super Netball games for the Sunshine Coast Lightning.

NOTES:

- Debut: Players are listed in order of player cap number as designated by the club and as featured on player's netball dress. Foundation players received their numbers in the order in which they signed with the club.
- Appearances:
  - Super Netball games for Sunshine Coast Lightning only. This not a total of their career games and does not include games for other clubs or in other competitions. E.g. Caitlin Bassett has played a career total of 56 Super Netball games in Australia, but of those 33 were at Sunshine Coast.
  - Unused reserve players do not gain an appearance for games in which they did not take to the court.
- Previous Club: refers to the previous netball club (Super Netball, overseas, or previous Australia/NZ elite level netball competitions) the player played at, and does not refer to any junior club she was signed to but never played at.
- Premierships: Indicates player was part of the Lightning match day squad that won a Super Netball Grand Final.
- Players in **bold** are contracted to the Lightning for 2025
- The statistics in this table are current as at the end of the 2025 Suncorp Super Netball season.

== List of all time players ==
| Cap No. | Name | Nationality | Lightning Career | Debut | Previous club | Position(s) | Appearances | Premierships |
|---|---|---|---|---|---|---|---|---|
| 1. | Steph Fretwell | (Australia) | 2017–25 | Round 4 | New South Wales Swifts | GA, GS, WA | 132 | |
| 2. | Kelsey Browne | (Australia) | 2017–18 | Round 2 | Melbourne Vixens | WA, C | 32 | |
| 3. | Laura Langman | (New Zealand) | 2017, 2019–20 | Round 1 | New South Wales Swifts | C, WD, WA | 45 | |
| 4. | Geva Mentor | (England) | 2017–18 | Round 1 | Melbourne Vixens | GK | 33 | |
| 5. | Caitlin Bassett | (Australia) | 2017–18 | Round 1 | West Coast Fever | GS | 33 | |
| 6. | **Cara Koenen** | (Australia) | 2017– | Round 1 | Debut | GS, GA | 107 | |
| 7. | Erena Mikaere | (New Zealand) | 2017–18 | Round 1 | West Coast Fever | GD, GK | 15 | |
| 8. | Madeline McAuliffe | (Australia) | 2017–21 | Round 1 | Debut | WD, C | 74 | |
| 9. | Karla Pretorius | (South Africa) | 2017–21; 2023 | Round 1 | Team Bath | GD, WD | 93 | |
| 10. | Laura Scherian | (Australia) | 2017–23 | Round 1 | Queensland Firebirds | WA, C | 106 | |
| 11. (Note: Maria Lutua was a temporary replacement player for Stephanie Wood (Round 1-3 2017), but was an unused interchange player.) | Maria Lutua | (Fiji) | 2017 | — | Yorkshire Jets | GA | — | |
| 11. (Note: Sarahpheinna Woulf injured her knee before the start of the 2018 season, and was replaced in the squad by Jacqui Russell.) | Sarahpheinna Woulf | (Australia) | 2018 | — | Debut | GD, GK | — | |
| 12. | Jacqui Russell | (Australia) | 2018–20 | Round 5 | Queensland Firebirds | WD, C | 29 | |
| 13. | Annika Lee-Jones | (Australia) | 2019–22 | Round 2 | West Coast Fever | GK, GS | 10 | |
| 14. | Peace Proscovia | (Uganda) | 2019–21 | Round 1 | Loughborough Lightning | GS | 42 | |
| 15. | Phumza Maweni | (South Africa) | 2019–21 | Round 1 | Severn Stars | GK, GD | 46 | |
| 16. | Binnian Hunt | (Australia) | 2020-21 | Round 2 | Debut | GA, WA, GS | 12 | |
| 17. | Ashlee Unie | (Australia) | 2020, 2022 | Round 3 | Debut | WD, GD | 3 | |
| 18. | Annabelle Lawrie | (Australia) | 2020, 2022 | Round 8 | Debut | GS, GA | 2 | |
| 19. | Kate Walsh | (England) (Australia) | 2021–22 | Round 1 | Adelaide Thunderbirds | GK, GD, WD | 26 | |
| 20. | **Mahalia Cassidy** | (Australia) | 2021– | Round 1 | Queensland Firebirds | C, WD, WA | 72 | |
| 21. | **Maddison Hinchliffe** | (Australia) | 2021–22, 2024– | Round 14 | Queensland Firebirds | C, WD, WA | 18 | |
| 22. | Kadie-Ann Dehaney | (Jamaica) | 2022–23 | Round 1 | Melbourne Vixens | GK, GD | 25 | |
| 23. | Tara Hinchliffe | (Australia) | 2022–25 | Round 1 | Queensland Firebirds | GD, GK | 44 | |
| 24. | Reilly Batcheldor | (Australia) | 2022–25 | Round 1 | Debut | GA, GS | 40 | |
| 25. | Annie Miller | (Australia) | 2022–23 | Round 1 | Giants Netball | WA, C | 26 | |
| 26. | Jada Gafa | (Australia) | 2022 | Round 9 | Debut | WA, C | 1 | |
| 27. | Bridey Condren | (Australia) | 2022 | Round 10 | West Coast Fever | GK, GD | 1 | |
| 28. | Charlie Bell | (Australia) | 2023–24 | Round 2 | Debut | GS | 8 | |
| 29. | **Ashleigh Ervin** | (Australia) | 2023– | Round 2 | Debut | GK, GD | 40 | |
| 30. | **Shannon Eagland** | (Australia) | 2023– | Round 3 | West Coast Fever | WD, GD | 7 | |
| 31. | **Ava Black** | (Australia) | 2023– | Round 4 | Debut | C, WA, WD | 17 | |
| 32. | **Leesa Mi Mi** | (Australia) | 2024– | Round 1 | Queensland Firebirds | C, WA | 28 | |
| 33. | **Liz Watson** | (Australia) | 2024– | Round 1 | Melbourne Vixens | WA, C | 29 | |
| 34. | **Courtney Bruce** | (Australia) | 2024– | Round 1 | West Coast Fever | GK, GD | 23 | |
| 35. | Kristiana Manu'a | (Australia) | 2025 | Round 1 | Melbourne Mavericks | WD | 10 | |
| 36. | **Baylee Boyd** | (Australia) | 2025– | Round 1 | Melbourne Mavericks | WD, C | 1 | |

== 2025 squad ==
2026 Sunshine Coast Lightning roster
Players
Coaching staff

| Nat. | Name | Position(s) | DoB | Height |
|---|---|---|---|---|
| (Australia) | Donnell Wallam | GS | 23 January 1994 (age 31) | 1.90 m (6 ft 3 in) |
| (Australia) | Ava Black | C, WD | 12 June 2003 (age 22) | 1.84 m (6 ft 0 in) |
| (Australia) | Courtney Bruce | GK, GD | 8 December 1993 (age 32) | 1.89 m (6 ft 2 in) |
| (Australia) | Mahalia Cassidy | C, WA, WD | 9 October 1995 (age 30) | 1.73 m (5 ft 8 in) |
| (Australia) | Ash Ervin | GK, GD | 15 May 2003 (age 22) | 1.92 m (6 ft 4 in) |
| (New Zealand) | Karin Burger | GD, WD | 12 April 1993 (age 32) | 1.84 m (6 ft 0 in) |
| (Australia) | Cara Koenen | GS, GA | 27 February 1996 (age 29) | 1.90 m (6 ft 3 in) |
| (Australia) | Gabrielle Sinclair | GA,GS | 12 July 1993 (age 32) | 1.76 m (5 ft 9 in) |
| (Australia) | Leesa Mi Mi | WA, C | 18 May 2001 (age 24) | 1.70 m (5 ft 7 in) |
| (Australia) | Liz Watson | WA, C | 30 March 1994 (age 31) | 1.78 m (5 ft 10 in) |

Head coach

- Belinda Reynolds

Assistant coaches

- Jenny Brazel

Notes

- **(c)** – Captain
- **(cc)** – Co-captain
- **(vc)** – Vice-captain
- – Injury / maternity leave
- **(TRP)** – Temporary Replacement Player
Player profiles: Team website
Last updated: 05 Nov 2025
