= 2025 Suncorp Super Netball season =

- League: Suncorp Super Netball
- Sport: Netball
- Duration: Saturday 5 April 2025 – Saturday 2 August 2025
- Teams: 8
- Total attendance: 386,455
- TV partner: Fox Sports
- Streaming partner(s): Kayo Sports and BINGE

Regular season
- Minor premiers: West Coast Fever
- Season MVP: Jhaniele Fowler-Nembhard
- Top scorer: Jhaniele Fowler-Nembhard (724 points)

Finals
- Champions: Melbourne Vixens
- Runners-up: West Coast Fever
- Finals MVP: Kiera Austin

Seasons
- ← 2024 2026 →

The 2025 Suncorp Super Netball season was the ninth season of the premier netball league in Australia. The season commenced on Saturday 5 April and concluded with the Grand Final on Saturday 2 August at Rod Laver Arena in Melbourne. The defending premiers were the Adelaide Thunderbirds.

The Melbourne Vixens won their second Super Netball title, defeating the minor premiers West Coast Fever by a single point in the Grand Final.

== Team Lists ==
Team	Home Court(s)	Coach	Attack	Midcourt	Defence	11th Player
Adelaide Thunderbirds	Adelaide Entertainment Centre	Tania Obst	(Jamaica) Romelda Aiken-George (Australia) Lucy Austin (Australia) Lauren Frew (Australia) Georgie Horjus (Australia) Kayla Graham	(Australia) Tayla Williams (Australia) Hannah Petty	(Jamaica) Latanya Wilson (Australia) Matilda Garrett (Jamaica) Shamera Sterling-Humphrey (Maternity Leave) (South Africa) Sanmarie Visser (Replacement Player)	(Australia) Sophie Casey
GIANTS Netball	Ken Rosewall Arena	Julie Fitzgerald	(England) Jo Harten (Australia) Sophie Dwyer (Australia) Matisse Letherbarrow	(Australia) Maddie Hay (Australia) Jamie-Lee Price (Australia) Amy Sligar (New Zealand) Gina Crampton (Maternity Leave) (Australia) Hope White (Replacement Player)	(Australia) Erin O'Brien (Australia) Matilda McDonell (Jamaica) Jodi-Ann Ward (Injury Leave) (New Zealand) Casey Kopua (Replacement Player)	(Australia) Monika 'Otai
Melbourne Mavericks	John Cain Arena; MyState Bank Arena	Tracey Neville	(Jamaica) Shimona Jok (England) Sasha Glasgow (England) Eleanor Cardwell (Injury Leave) (Tonga) Uneeq Palavi (Replacement Player)	(Australia) Maisie Nankivell (Australia) Tayla Fraser (Australia) Molly Jovic (Australia) Amy Parmenter	(Australia) Kim Brown (née Jenner) (Australia) Olivia Lewis (Australia) Lauren Parkinson (née Moore) (Injury Leave)	(Australia) Jessie Grenvold (Replacement Player)
Melbourne Vixens	John Cain Arena	Simone McKinnis	(Australia) Sophie Garbin (Australia) Kiera Austin (Australia) Lily Graham	(Australia) Hannah Mundy (Australia) Zara Walters (Australia) Kate Moloney	(Australia) Kate Eddy (Australia) Jo Weston (Australia) Rudi Ellis (Australia) Emily Mannix (Maternity Leave) (Australia) Maggie Caris (Replacement Player)	(Australia) Tara Watson
NSW Swifts	Ken Rosewall Arena; Qudos Bank Arena	Briony Akle	(New Zealand) Grace Nweke (England) Helen Housby (Australia) Sophie Fawns	(Australia) Paige Hadley (Australia) Allie Smith (Australia) Sharni Lambden (Australia) Maddy Proud (Maternity Leave) (Australia) Verity Simmons (Replacement Player)	(Australia) Maddy Turner (Australia) Sarah Klau (Australia) Teigan O'Shannassy	(Australia) Grace Whyte
Queensland Firebirds	Nissan Arena	Kiri Wills	(Uganda) Mary Cholhok (Australia) Emily Moore (Australia) Tippah Dwan (Injury Leave) (New Zealand) Abigail Latu-Meafou (Replacement Player)	(Australia) Lara Dunkley (Australia) Macy Gardner (England) Imogen Allison (Tonga) Hulita Veve	(Australia) Ruby Bakewell-Doran (Australia) Isabelle Shearer (Australia) Ashlee Barnett	—N/a
Sunshine Coast Lightning	UniSC Arena	Belinda Reynolds	(Australia) Cara Koenen (Australia) Steph Fretwell (Australia) Reilley Batcheldor	(Australia) Liz Watson (Australia) Leesa Mi Mi (Australia) Mahalia Cassidy (Australia) Ava Black (Injury Leave)	(Australia) Tara Hinchliffe (Australia) Courtney Bruce (Australia) Ashleigh Ervin (Samoa) Kristiana Manu'a (Replacement Player)	(Australia) Maddie Hinchliffe
West Coast Fever	RAC Arena	Dan Ryan	(Australia) Olivia Wilkinson (Jamaica) Shanice Beckford (Australia) Alice Teague-Neeld (Jamaica) Jhaniele Fowler-Nembhard (Personal Leave) (Malawi) Mwai Kumwenda (Replacement Player)	(Australia) Jordan Cransberg (Australia) Jess Anstiss	(Australia) Sunday Aryang (England) Fran Williams (Jamaica) Kadie-Ann Dehaney (Australia) Ruth Aryang (Injury Leave)	(Australia) Zoe Cransberg (Replacement Player)

== Contracted Signings ==
Important dates in relation to player signings for the 2025 season are:

- Until 27 July 2024: Current players can be re-signed by their 2024 team.
- 5 August 2024 to 23 August 2024: Clubs can sign any free-agent and non-SSN players during this time.
- From 26 August 2024: Training Partners and Nominated Athletes can be signed on a one-year contract.

=== Arrivals ===
The following table is a list of players who moved clubs/leagues into Super Netball, or were elevated to a permanent position in the senior team during the off-season. It does not include contracted players who were re-signed by their original Super Netball clubs.

Name	Moving from	Moving to	Ref
(Jamaica) Shimona Jok	(Australia) Melbourne Mavericks (Nominated Athlete)	Melbourne Mavericks	
(Uganda) Mary Cholhok	(England) Loughborough Lightning (Netball Super League)	Queensland Firebirds	
(Australia) Ruth Aryang	(Australia) West Coast Fever (Nominated Athlete)	West Coast Fever	
(England) Imogen Allison	(England) Manchester Thunder (Netball Super League)	Queensland Firebirds	
(Australia) Lily Graham	(Australia) Melbourne Vixens (Replacement Player)	Melbourne Vixens	
(New Zealand) Grace Nweke	(New Zealand) Northern Mystics (ANZ Premiership)	NSW Swifts	
(Australia) Ashlee Barnett	(Australia) Firebirds Futures	Queensland Firebirds	
(New Zealand) Gina Crampton	(Australia) GIANTS Netball (Training Partner)	GIANTS Netball	
(Australia) Kayla Graham	(Australia) Adelaide Thunderbirds (Training Partner)	Adelaide Thunderbirds	
(Australia) Sharni Lambden	(Australia) Melbourne Vixens (Training Partner)	NSW Swifts	

=== Departures ===
The following table is a list of players who left their respective Super Netball clubs, became an off-court club ambassador or retired at the end of the previous season.

Name	Moving from	Moving to	Ref
(Trinidad and Tobago) Sam Wallace-Joseph	NSW Swifts	(England) Loughborough Lightning (Netball Super League)	
(Australia) Kim Ravaillion	Queensland Firebirds	Retirement	
(Australia) Donnell Wallam	Queensland Firebirds	(New Zealand) Northern Mystics (ANZ Premiership)	
(Australia) Remi Kamo	Queensland Firebirds	(New Zealand) Northern Stars (ANZ Premiership)	
(New Zealand) Sam Winders	GIANTS Netball	New Zealand	
(Australia) Gabrielle Sinclair	Melbourne Mavericks	(England) Birmingham Panthers (Netball Super League)	
(Australia) Laura Scherian	Adelaide Thunderbirds	Retirement	
(Australia) Lili Gorman-Brown	NSW Swifts	(Australia) NSW Swifts (Training Partner)	
(Australia) Kelsey Browne	West Coast Fever	(Australia) West Coast Fever (Training Partner & Club Ambassador)	
(Malawi) Mwai Kumwenda	Melbourne Vixens (Maternity Leave)	(Australia) West Coast Fever (Replacement Player)	

== 2025 Suncorp Team Girls Cup ==
- Source: Click here

For the fourth consecutive year, the league's official pre-season tournament was staged. The 2025 Suncorp Team Girls Cup was held at Netball SA Stadium from Friday 14 March to Sunday 16 March. The eight Super Netball teams were split into two pools, playing each of their group opponents once, before playing an inter-group match to determine places from first to eighth. The two pools were formed based on last year's ladder - Pool A comprising 1st, 4th, 5th & 8th, with Pool B comprising 2nd, 3rd, 6th & 7th.

The tournament was won by the Adelaide Thunderbirds, who defeated the West Coast Fever 38–37 in the final. The player of the match was Latanya Wilson.

=== Pool A Ladder ===
Pool A Matches
Pos	Team	P	W	D	L	GF	GA	%	Pts
1	Adelaide Thunderbirds	3	2	0	1	129	109	118.35	8
2	Melbourne Mavericks	3	2	0	1	129	118	109.32	8
3	GIANTS Netball	3	1	0	2	120	131	91.60	4
4	Sunshine Coast Lightning	3	1	0	2	111	131	84.73	4

=== Pool B Ladder ===
Pool B Matches
Pos	Team	P	W	D	L	GF	GA	%	Pts
1	West Coast Fever	3	3	0	0	136	115	118.26	12
2	NSW Swifts	3	2	0	1	126	126	100.00	8
3	Melbourne Vixens	3	1	0	2	134	127	105.51	4
4	Queensland Firebirds	3	0	0	3	117	145	80.69	0

=== Session 1 ===
Friday 14 March; 5:00pm ACDT	Report; Stats	West Coast Fever	50 – 35	Queensland Firebirds	Netball SA Stadium
Friday 14 March; 5:00pm ACDT	Report; Stats	2 Goal Shots; Olivia Wilkinson 2/3 (67%); Mwai Kumwenda 2/4 (50%); Alice Teague-Neeld 1/2 (50%); Shanice Beckford 0/1 (0%); 1 Goal Shots; Olivia Wilkinson 19/21 (90%); Mwai Kumwenda 15/16 (94%); Shanice Beckford 6/7 (86%); Alice Teague-Neeld 0/4 (0%)		2 Goal Shots; Tippah Dwan 2/2 (100%); Abigail Latu-Meafou 1/1 (100%); Mary Cholhok 1/2 (50%); Emily Moore 1/2 (50%); 1 Goal Shots; Mary Cholhok 15/20 (75%); Tippah Dwan 5/6 (83%); Abigail Latu-Meafou 4/5 (80%); Emily Moore 1/1 (100%)	Netball SA Stadium

Friday 14 March; 6:00pm ACDT	Report; Stats	Sunshine Coast Lightning	38 – 39	GIANTS Netball	Netball SA Stadium
Friday 14 March; 6:00pm ACDT	Report; Stats	2 Goal Shots; Steph Fretwell 5/6 (83%); Reilley Batcheldor 1/3 (33%); 1 Goal Shots; Reilley Batcheldor 12/15 (80%); Cara Koenen 11/14 (79%); Steph Fretwell 3/3 (100%)		2 Goal Shots; Jo Harten 2/5 (40%); Sophie Dwyer 1/4 (25%); 1 Goal Shots; Jo Harten 22/25 (88%); Sophie Dwyer 11/14 (79%)	Netball SA Stadium

Friday 14 March; 7:00pm ACDT	Report; Stats	Melbourne Vixens	42 – 43	NSW Swifts	Netball SA Stadium
Friday 14 March; 7:00pm ACDT	Report; Stats	2 Goal Shots; Sophie Garbin 3/5 (60%); Kiera Austin 2/3 (67%); Lily Graham 1/3 (33%); 1 Goal Shots; Sophie Garbin 15/16 (94%); Lily Graham 8/10 (80%); Kiera Austin 7/9 (78%)		2 Goal Shots; Helen Housby 2/2 (100%); Sophie Fawns 1/3 (33%); 1 Goal Shots; Grace Nweke 25/27 (93%); Helen Housby 7/8 (88%); Sophie Fawns 5/5 (100%)	Netball SA Stadium

Friday 14 March; 8:00pm ACDT	Report; Stats	Adelaide Thunderbirds	42 – 31	Melbourne Mavericks	Netball SA Stadium
Friday 14 March; 8:00pm ACDT	Report; Stats	2 Goal Shots; Lucy Austin 0/2 (0%); Lauren Frew 0/2 (0%); Georgie Horjus 0/2 (0%); 1 Goal Shots; Lucy Austin 24/28 (86%); Lauren Frew 9/9 (100%); Georgie Horjus 9/9 (100%)		2 Goal Shots; Sasha Glasgow 2/3 (67%); 1 Goal Shots; Shimona Jok 16/17 (94%); Sasha Glasgow 8/9 (89%); Uneeq Palavi 2/2 (100%); Nyah Allen 1/1 (100%)	Netball SA Stadium

=== Session 2 ===
Saturday 15 March; 12:00pm ACDT	Report; Stats	NSW Swifts	34 – 39	West Coast Fever	Netball SA Stadium
Saturday 15 March; 12:00pm ACDT	Report; Stats	2 Goal Shots; Helen Housby 3/4 (75%); Grace Whyte 2/2 (100%); Sophie Fawns 0/3 (0%); 1 Goal Shots; Helen Housby 13/13 (100%); Grace Whyte 8/10 (80%); Sophie Fawns 3/5 (60%)		2 Goal Shots; Shanice Beckford 1/2 (50%); Olivia Wilkinson 0/3 (0%); 1 Goal Shots; Olivia Wilkinson 26/29 (90%); Shanice Beckford 8/8 (100%); Mwai Kumwenda 3/4 (75%)	Netball SA Stadium

Saturday 15 March; 1:00pm ACDT	Report; Stats	Queensland Firebirds	37 – 46	Melbourne Vixens	Netball SA Stadium
Saturday 15 March; 1:00pm ACDT	Report; Stats	2 Goal Shots; Abigail Latu-Meafou 3/4 (75%); Mary Cholhok 1/1 (100%); Emily Moore 1/3 (33%); 1 Goal Shots; Mary Cholhok 14/21 (67%); Abigail Latu-Meafou 10/13 (77%); Emily Moore 3/3 (100%)		2 Goal Shots; Sophie Garbin 3/5 (60%); Lily Graham 2/3 (67%); Mia Lavis 0/2 (0%); 1 Goal Shots; Sophie Garbin 27/28 (96%); Lily Graham 6/8 (75%); Mia Lavis 3/3 (100%)	Netball SA Stadium

Saturday 15 March; 2:00pm ACDT	Report; Stats	Melbourne Mavericks	55 – 34	Sunshine Coast Lightning	Netball SA Stadium
Saturday 15 March; 2:00pm ACDT	Report; Stats	2 Goal Shots; Nyah Allen 2/3 (67%); Uneeq Palavi 1/2 (50%); 1 Goal Shots; Shimona Jok 38/40 (95%); Uneeq Palavi 8/9 (89%); Nyah Allen 3/3 (100%)		2 Goal Shots; Rylee Burns 4/7 (57%); Cara Koenen 1/3 (33%); Reilley Batcheldor 0/1 (0%); Natalie Sligar 0/4 (0%); 1 Goal Shots; Cara Koenen 12/14 (86%); Rylee Burns 6/6 (100%); Reilley Batcheldor 6/8 (75%)	Netball SA Stadium

Saturday 15 March; 3:00pm ACDT	Report; Stats	GIANTS Netball	39 – 50	Adelaide Thunderbirds	Netball SA Stadium
Saturday 15 March; 3:00pm ACDT	Report; Stats	2 Goal Shots; Matisse Letherbarrow 4/6 (67%); 1 Goal Shots; Matisse Letherbarrow 24/27 (89%); Monika 'Otai 5/5 (100%); Olivia Harris 2/2 (100%)		2 Goal Shots; Lucy Austin 1/2 (50%); Kayla Graham 1/4 (25%); Romelda Aiken-George 0/1 (0%); 1 Goal Shots; Romelda Aiken-George 25/26 (96%); Lucy Austin 11/11 (100%); Kayla Graham 9/10 (90%); Lauren Frew 1/2 (50%)	Netball SA Stadium

=== Session 3 ===
Saturday 15 March; 5:00pm ACDT	Report; Stats	NSW Swifts	49 – 45	Queensland Firebirds	Netball SA Stadium
Saturday 15 March; 5:00pm ACDT	Report; Stats	2 Goal Shots; Helen Housby 3/4 (75%); Grace Nweke 1/1 (100%); Sophie Fawns 1/1 (100%); Grace Whyte 0/1 (0%); 1 Goal Shots; Grace Nweke 30/34 (88%); Sophie Fawns 5/5 (100%); Helen Housby 3/3 (100%); Grace Whyte 1/1 (100%)		2 Goal Shots; Tippah Dwan 1/4 (25%); Abigail Latu-Meafou 1/5 (20%); Mary Cholhok 0/2 (0%); 1 Goal Shots; Mary Cholhok 32/36 (89%); Abigail Latu-Meafou 4/5 (80%); Tippah Dwan 4/6 (67%); Emily Moore 1/1 (100%)	Netball SA Stadium

Saturday 15 March; 6:00pm ACDT	Report; Stats	West Coast Fever	47 – 46	Melbourne Vixens	Netball SA Stadium
Saturday 15 March; 6:00pm ACDT	Report; Stats	2 Goal Shots; Mwai Kumwenda 4/4 (100%); Olivia Wilkinson 3/3 (100%); Sloan Burton 1/1 (100%); 1 Goal Shots; Olivia Wilkinson 20/22 (91%); Mwai Kumwenda 10/10 (100%); Sloan Burton 1/1 (100%)		2 Goal Shots; Lily Graham 4/5 (80%); Kiera Austin 3/3 (100%); Sophie Garbin 1/3 (33%); 1 Goal Shots; Sophie Garbin 15/17 (88%); Kiera Austin 11/13 (85%); Lily Graham 4/5 (80%)	Netball SA Stadium

Saturday 15 March; 7:00pm ACDT	Report; Stats	GIANTS Netball	42 – 43	Melbourne Mavericks	Netball SA Stadium
Saturday 15 March; 7:00pm ACDT	Report; Stats	2 Goal Shots; Sophie Dwyer 3/4 (75%); Matisse Letherbarrow 0/1 (0%); Olivia Harris 0/1 (0%); 1 Goal Shots; Sophie Dwyer 20/23 (87%); Matisse Letherbarrow 13/15 (87%); Olivia Harris 3/4 (75%)		2 Goal Shots; Uneeq Palavi 3/5 (60%); Nyah Allen 0/1 (0%); 1 Goal Shots; Shimona Jok 23/23 (100%); Uneeq Palavi 7/7 (100%); Nyah Allen 7/7 (100%)	Netball SA Stadium

Saturday 15 March; 8:00pm ACDT	Report; Stats	Adelaide Thunderbirds	37 – 39	Sunshine Coast Lightning	Netball SA Stadium
Saturday 15 March; 8:00pm ACDT	Report; Stats	2 Goal Shots; Lucy Austin 2/6 (33%); Georgie Horjus 0/1 (0%); Kayla Graham 0/1 (0%); 1 Goal Shots; Lucy Austin 21/23 (91%); Lauren Frew 9/9 (100%); Georgie Horjus 2/3 (67%); Kayla Graham 1/3 (33%)		2 Goal Shots; Reilley Batcheldor 4/4 (100%); Steph Fretwell 1/4 (25%); 1 Goal Shots; Cara Koenen 12/14 (86%); Steph Fretwell 10/12 (83%); Reilley Batcheldor 7/7 (100%)	Netball SA Stadium

=== Finals ===
Sunday 16 March; 1:00pm ACDT	Report; Stats	Sunshine Coast Lightning (4th Pool A)	43 – 41	Queensland Firebirds (4th Pool B)	Netball SA Stadium
Sunday 16 March; 1:00pm ACDT	Report; Stats	2 Goal Shots; Steph Fretwell 3/5 (60%); Reilley Batcheldor 3/4 (75%); Cara Koenen 0/1 (0%); 1 Goal Shots; Cara Koenen 13/14 (93%); Reilley Batcheldor 12/16 (75%); Steph Fretwell 6/6 (100%)		2 Goal Shots; Mary Cholhok 2/6 (33%); Emily Moore 1/1 (100%); Tippah Dwan 0/1 (0%); Abigail Latu-Meafou 0/2 (0%); 1 Goal Shots; Mary Cholhok 24/26 (92%); Emily Moore 5/5 (100%); Abigail Latu-Meafou 4/5 (80%); Tippah Dwan 2/2 (100%)	Netball SA Stadium

Sunday 16 March; 2:00pm ACDT	Report; Stats	GIANTS Netball (3rd Pool A)	34 – 47	Melbourne Vixens (3rd Pool B)	Netball SA Stadium
Sunday 16 March; 2:00pm ACDT	Report; Stats	2 Goal Shots; Jo Harten 4/9 (44%); Sophie Dwyer 1/4 (25%); 1 Goal Shots; Jo Harten 16/16 (100%); Sophie Dwyer 8/11 (73%)		2 Goal Shots; Kiera Austin 4/6 (67%); Sophie Garbin 1/2 (50%); Lily Graham 0/1 (0%); 1 Goal Shots; Sophie Garbin 18/19 (95%); Kiera Austin 14/14 (100%); Lily Graham 5/6 (83%)	Netball SA Stadium

Sunday 16 March; 3:00pm ACDT	Report; Stats	Melbourne Mavericks (2nd Pool A)	49 – 51	NSW Swifts (2nd Pool B)	Netball SA Stadium
Sunday 16 March; 3:00pm ACDT	Report; Stats	2 Goal Shots; Sasha Glasgow 3/7 (43%); 1 Goal Shots; Shimona Jok 39/40 (98%); Sasha Glasgow 4/5 (80%)		2 Goal Shots; Grace Whyte 2/2 (100%); Helen Housby 2/4 (50%); 1 Goal Shots; Grace Nweke 33/35 (94%); Helen Housby 9/9 (100%); Sophie Fawns 1/2 (50%)	Netball SA Stadium

Sunday 16 March; 4:00pm ACDT	Report; Stats	Adelaide Thunderbirds (1st Pool A)	38 – 37	West Coast Fever (1st Pool B)	Netball SA Stadium
Sunday 16 March; 4:00pm ACDT	Report; Stats	2 Goal Shots; Georgie Horjus 2/4 (50%); Lauren Frew 1/1 (100%); Lucy Austin 1/2 (50%); Kayla Graham 0/1 (0%); 1 Goal Shots; Lucy Austin 17/20 (85%); Georgie Horjus 6/6 (100%); Lauren Frew 6/6 (100%); Kayla Graham 1/1 (100%)		2 Goal Shots; Olivia Wilkinson 3/5 (60%); 1 Goal Shots; Olivia Wilkinson 23/26 (88%); Shanice Beckford 7/9 (78%); Mwai Kumwenda 1/1 (100%)	Netball SA Stadium

=== Final Placements ===
Place	Team
1st	Adelaide Thunderbirds
2nd	West Coast Fever
3rd	NSW Swifts
4th	Melbourne Mavericks
5th	Melbourne Vixens
6th	GIANTS Netball
7th	Sunshine Coast Lightning
8th	Queensland Firebirds

== Regular season ==
- Source: Click here (all times are in local time)

=== Round 1 ===
Saturday 5 April	Adelaide Thunderbirds	66 – 53	Melbourne Vixens	Adelaide Entertainment Centre
4:30pm ACDT	2 Goal Shots; Lauren Frew 4/6 (67%); Georgie Horjus 2/2 (100%); Lucy Austin 0/2 (0%); 1 Goal Shots; Romelda Aiken-George 34/35 (97%); Lucy Austin 10/11 (91%); Lauren Frew 9/11 (82%); Georgie Horjus 1/1 (100%)	Report; Stats	2 Goal Shots; Lily Graham 5/7 (71%); Kiera Austin 4/6 (67%); Sophie Garbin 0/1 (0%); 1 Goal Shots; Sophie Garbin 17/20 (85%); Kiera Austin 10/13 (77%); Lily Graham 8/8 (100%)	Attendance: 7,683

Saturday 5 April	Melbourne Mavericks	59 – 69	Sunshine Coast Lightning	John Cain Arena
7:00pm AEDT	2 Goal Shots; Uneeq Palavi 5/6 (83%); Sasha Glasgow 2/7 (29%); 1 Goal Shots; Shimona Jok 37/43 (86%); Sasha Glasgow 7/9 (78%); Uneeq Palavi 1/1 (100%)	Report; Stats	2 Goal Shots; Steph Fretwell 6/8 (75%); Reilley Batcheldor 2/3 (67%); 1 Goal Shots; Cara Koenen 23/26 (88%); Reilley Batcheldor 20/21 (95%); Steph Fretwell 10/11 (91%)	Attendance: 3,816

Sunday 6 April	GIANTS Netball	57 – 62	Queensland Firebirds	Ken Rosewall Arena
2:00pm AEST	2 Goal Shots; Matisse Letherbarrow 6/11 (55%); Sophie Dwyer 0/4 (0%); 1 Goal Shots; Matisse Letherbarrow 29/30 (97%); Sophie Dwyer 14/15 (93%); Jo Harten 2/2 (100%)	Report; Stats	2 Goal Shots; Emily Moore 3/4 (75%); Tippah Dwan 0/1 (0%); Mary Cholhok 0/3 (0%); 1 Goal Shots; Mary Cholhok 43/56 (77%); Emily Moore 8/12 (67%); Tippah Dwan 5/8 (63%)	Attendance: 2,517

Sunday 6 April	West Coast Fever	49 – 67	NSW Swifts	RAC Arena
2:00pm AWST	2 Goal Shots; Olivia Wilkinson 3/8 (38%); Mwai Kumwenda 2/4 (50%); Shanice Beckford 0/2 (0%); 1 Goal Shots; Olivia Wilkinson 26/27 (96%); Shanice Beckford 8/12 (67%); Mwai Kumwenda 5/8 (63%)	Report; Stats	2 Goal Shots; Helen Housby 2/4 (50%); Grace Nweke 0/1 (0%); 1 Goal Shots; Grace Nweke 51/57 (89%); Helen Housby 12/12 (100%)	Attendance: 8,353

=== Round 2 ===
Saturday 12 April	Queensland Firebirds	67 – 54	West Coast Fever	Nissan Arena
5:00pm AEST	2 Goal Shots; Tippah Dwan 2/2 (100%); Emily Moore 1/4 (25%); Mary Cholhok 0/1 (0%); 1 Goal Shots; Mary Cholhok 42/47 (89%); Emily Moore 16/20 (80%); Tippah Dwan 3/5 (60%)	Report; Stats	2 Goal Shots; Alice Teague-Neeld 1/1 (100%); Olivia Wilkinson 1/3 (33%); Mwai Kumwenda 1/3 (33%); Shanice Beckford 0/1 (0%); 1 Goal Shots; Olivia Wilkinson 37/40 (93%); Mwai Kumwenda 6/6 (100%); Shanice Beckford 5/7 (71%); Alice Teague-Neeld 0/1 (0%)	Attendance: 4,526

Saturday 12 April	NSW Swifts	68 – 62	Melbourne Mavericks	Ken Rosewall Arena
7:00pm AEST	2 Goal Shots; Helen Housby 5/6 (83%); 1 Goal Shots; Grace Nweke 49/51 (96%); Helen Housby 9/10 (90%)	Report; Stats	2 Goal Shots; Uneeq Palavi 1/2 (50%); Shimona Jok 0/2 (0%); Sasha Glasgow 0/2 (0%); 1 Goal Shots; Shimona Jok 55/55 (100%); Sasha Glasgow 4/4 (100%); Uneeq Palavi 1/2 (50%)	Attendance: 6,011

Sunday 13 April	Sunshine Coast Lightning	45 – 60	Adelaide Thunderbirds	UniSC Arena
2:00pm AEST	2 Goal Shots; Steph Fretwell 5/11 (45%); Reilley Batcheldor 2/6 (33%); Cara Koenen 0/1 (0%); 1 Goal Shots; Steph Fretwell 13/15 (87%); Cara Koenen 13/16 (81%); Reilley Batcheldor 5/5 (100%)	Report; Stats	2 Goal Shots; Georgie Horjus 1/2 (50%); Lauren Frew 1/4 (25%); Romelda Aiken-George 0/2 (0%); 1 Goal Shots; Romelda Aiken-George 40/44 (91%); Lauren Frew 13/15 (87%); Georgie Horjus 3/3 (100%)	Attendance: 2,822

Sunday 13 April	Melbourne Vixens	61 – 55	GIANTS Netball	John Cain Arena
4:00pm AEST	2 Goal Shots; Kiera Austin 2/3 (67%); Sophie Garbin 0/2 (0%); 1 Goal Shots; Sophie Garbin 33/35 (94%); Kiera Austin 24/27 (89%)	Report; Stats	2 Goal Shots; Matisse Letherbarrow 4/6 (67%); Jo Harten 3/6 (50%); Sophie Dwyer 0/2 (0%); 1 Goal Shots; Matisse Letherbarrow 18/20 (90%); Sophie Dwyer 12/12 (100%); Jo Harten 11/13 (85%)	Attendance: 8,451

=== Round 3 ===
Sunday 20 April	Melbourne Mavericks	71 – 56	GIANTS Netball	John Cain Arena
2:00pm AEST	2 Goal Shots; Uneeq Palavi 2/4 (50%); 1 Goal Shots; Shimona Jok 60/63 (95%); Uneeq Palavi 7/7 (100%)	Report; Stats	2 Goal Shots; Matisse Letherbarrow 5/8 (63%); Jo Harten 1/2 (50%); Sophie Dwyer 1/3 (33%); 1 Goal Shots; Matisse Letherbarrow 16/17 (94%); Jo Harten 13/13 (100%); Sophie Dwyer 13/14 (93%)	Attendance: 2,956

Sunday 20 April	Adelaide Thunderbirds	57 – 65	NSW Swifts	Adelaide Entertainment Centre
3:30pm ACST	2 Goal Shots; Kayla Graham 3/3 (100%); Lauren Frew 0/2 (0%); Lucy Austin 0/3 (0%); 1 Goal Shots; Romelda Aiken-George 38/44 (86%); Lucy Austin 5/6 (83%); Lauren Frew 4/4 (100%); Kayla Graham 2/2 (100%); Georgie Horjus 2/2 (100%)	Report; Stats	2 Goal Shots; Helen Housby 4/5 (80%); 1 Goal Shots; Grace Nweke 48/50 (96%); Helen Housby 9/9 (100%)	Attendance: 7,060

Saturday 26 April	Sunshine Coast Lightning	64 – 50	Queensland Firebirds	UniSC Arena
5:00pm AEST	2 Goal Shots; Cara Koenen 2/2 (100%); Reilley Batcheldor 2/4 (50%); Steph Fretwell 2/6 (33%); 1 Goal Shots; Cara Koenen 37/42 (88%); Steph Fretwell 11/14 (79%); Reilley Batcheldor 4/4 (100%)	Report; Stats	2 Goal Shots; Emily Moore 4/9 (44%); Mary Cholhok 1/5 (20%); Tippah Dwan 0/1 (0%); 1 Goal Shots; Mary Cholhok 22/29 (76%); Emily Moore 13/14 (93%); Tippah Dwan 5/8 (63%)	Attendance: 2,829

Sunday 27 April	Melbourne Vixens	57 – 67	West Coast Fever	John Cain Arena
2:00pm AEST	2 Goal Shots; Kiera Austin 4/8 (50%); Lily Graham 3/6 (50%); Sophie Garbin 2/4 (50%); 1 Goal Shots; Sophie Garbin 14/16 (88%); Kiera Austin 14/18 (78%); Lily Graham 11/13 (85%)	Report; Stats	2 Goal Shots; Shanice Beckford 1/1 (100%); Jhaniele Fowler-Nembhard 0/1 (0%); 1 Goal Shots; Jhaniele Fowler-Nembhard 59/60 (98%); Shanice Beckford 6/10 (60%)	Attendance: 8,501

=== Round 4 ===
Saturday 3 May	GIANTS Netball	64 – 63	Adelaide Thunderbirds	Ken Rosewall Arena
5:00pm AEST	2 Goal Shots; Jo Harten 3/5 (60%); Sophie Dwyer 1/2 (50%); 1 Goal Shots; Jo Harten 30/33 (91%); Sophie Dwyer 22/26 (85%); Matisse Letherbarrow 4/4 (100%)	Report; Stats	2 Goal Shots; Lauren Frew 7/11 (64%); 1 Goal Shots; Romelda Aiken-George 40/45 (89%); Lauren Frew 9/9 (100%)	Attendance: 2,138

Saturday 3 May	West Coast Fever	68 – 66	Sunshine Coast Lightning	RAC Arena
5:00pm AWST	2 Goal Shots; Jhaniele Fowler-Nembhard 1/3 (33%); Olivia Wilkinson 1/6 (17%); 1 Goal Shots; Jhaniele Fowler-Nembhard 54/54 (100%); Shanice Beckford 7/11 (64%); Olivia Wilkinson 3/5 (60%)	Report; Stats	2 Goal Shots; Steph Fretwell 3/4 (75%); Reilley Batcheldor 2/4 (50%); Cara Koenen 1/3 (33%); 1 Goal Shots; Cara Koenen 29/31 (94%); Reilley Batcheldor 18/19 (95%); Steph Fretwell 7/10 (70%)	Attendance: 6,691

Sunday 4 May	Melbourne Mavericks	59 – 67	Melbourne Vixens	John Cain Arena
2:00pm AEST	2 Goal Shots; Uneeq Palavi 3/4 (75%); Sasha Glasgow 2/5 (40%); 1 Goal Shots; Shimona Jok 43/47 (91%); Uneeq Palavi 4/5 (80%); Sasha Glasgow 2/3 (67%)	Report; Stats	2 Goal Shots; Kiera Austin 3/4 (75%); Sophie Garbin 0/1 (0%); 1 Goal Shots; Sophie Garbin 45/51 (88%); Kiera Austin 16/18 (89%)	Attendance: 6,857

Sunday 4 May	NSW Swifts	71 – 63	Queensland Firebirds	Ken Rosewall Arena
4:00pm AEST	2 Goal Shots; Helen Housby 3/6 (50%); Grace Nweke 0/1 (0%); 1 Goal Shots; Grace Nweke 54/56 (96%); Helen Housby 11/12 (92%)	Report; Stats	2 Goal Shots; Emily Moore 2/3 (67%); Mary Cholhok 1/2 (50%); 1 Goal Shots; Mary Cholhok 42/50 (84%); Emily Moore 15/18 (83%); Tippah Dwan 0/1 (0%)	Attendance: 6,223

=== Round 5 ===
Saturday 10 May	Queensland Firebirds	53 – 62	Adelaide Thunderbirds	Nissan Arena
5:00pm AEST	2 Goal Shots; Emily Moore 3/4 (75%); Abigail Latu-Meafou 0/1 (0%); Mary Cholhok 0/4 (0%); 1 Goal Shots; Mary Cholhok 35/43 (81%); Emily Moore 8/9 (89%); Abigail Latu-Meafou 4/5 (80%)	Report; Stats	2 Goal Shots; Lauren Frew 4/5 (80%); Kayla Graham 0/1 (0%); 1 Goal Shots; Romelda Aiken-George 34/46 (74%); Lauren Frew 18/18 (100%); Kayla Graham 2/2 (100%)	Attendance: 4,590

Saturday 10 May	West Coast Fever	78 – 61	Melbourne Mavericks	RAC Arena
5:00pm AWST	2 Goal Shots; Olivia Wilkinson 2/4 (50%); Jhaniele Fowler-Nembhard 0/1 (0%); Shanice Beckford 0/1 (0%); 1 Goal Shots; Jhaniele Fowler-Nembhard 60/61 (98%); Olivia Wilkinson 8/8 (100%); Shanice Beckford 6/7 (86%)	Report; Stats	2 Goal Shots; Sasha Glasgow 5/12 (42%); Uneeq Palavi 1/3 (33%); 1 Goal Shots; Shimona Jok 40/42 (95%); Uneeq Palavi 5/6 (83%); Sasha Glasgow 4/6 (67%)	Attendance: 7,946

Sunday 11 May	Sunshine Coast Lightning	74 – 56	GIANTS Netball	UniSC Arena
2:00pm AEST	2 Goal Shots; Steph Fretwell 1/3 (33%); Reilley Batcheldor 1/4 (25%); 1 Goal Shots; Cara Koenen 56/62 (90%); Steph Fretwell 7/7 (100%); Reilley Batcheldor 7/9 (78%)	Report; Stats	2 Goal Shots; Matisse Letherbarrow 6/8 (75%); Sophie Dwyer 2/4 (50%); 1 Goal Shots; Matisse Letherbarrow 19/24 (79%); Sophie Dwyer 15/17 (88%); Monika 'Otai 6/6 (100%)	Attendance: 2,908

Sunday 11 May	NSW Swifts	59 – 51	Melbourne Vixens	Ken Rosewall Arena
4:00pm AEST	2 Goal Shots; Helen Housby 3/7 (43%); 1 Goal Shots; Grace Nweke 47/50 (94%); Helen Housby 6/6 (100%)	Report; Stats	2 Goal Shots; Kiera Austin 2/6 (33%); Lily Graham 1/2 (50%); 1 Goal Shots; Sophie Garbin 35/42 (83%); Kiera Austin 8/9 (89%); Lily Graham 2/3 (67%)	Attendance: 7,215

=== Round 6 ===
Saturday 17 May	Melbourne Mavericks	71 – 64	Queensland Firebirds	MyState Bank Arena
5:00pm AEST	2 Goal Shots; Sasha Glasgow 1/4 (25%); 1 Goal Shots; Shimona Jok 61/61 (100%); Sasha Glasgow 8/8 (100%)	Report; Stats	2 Goal Shots; Abigail Latu-Meafou 4/5 (80%); Emily Moore 1/5 (20%); 1 Goal Shots; Mary Cholhok 33/44 (75%); Emily Moore 16/17 (94%); Abigail Latu-Meafou 5/5 (100%)	Attendance: 2,587

Saturday 17 May	Adelaide Thunderbirds	61 – 67	West Coast Fever	Adelaide Entertainment Centre
6:30pm ACST	2 Goal Shots; Georgie Horjus 5/7 (71%); Lauren Frew 4/7 (57%); Romelda Aiken-George 0/1 (0%); 1 Goal Shots; Romelda Aiken 32/35 (91%); Lauren Frew 10/12 (83%); Georgie Horjus 1/2 (50%)	Report; Stats	2 Goal Shots; Olivia Wilkinson 0/1 (0%); 1 Goal Shots; Jhaniele Fowler-Nembhard 53/55 (96%); Shanice Beckford 9/12 (75%); Olivia Wilkinson 5/6 (83%)	Attendance: 8,233

Sunday 18 May	GIANTS Netball	69 – 82	NSW Swifts	Ken Rosewall Arena
2:00pm AEST	2 Goal Shots; Matisse Letherbarrow 5/8 (63%); Jo Harten 2/4 (50%); Sophie Dwyer 2/5 (40%); 1 Goal Shots; Jo Harten 25/25 (100%); Sophie Dwyer 15/16 (94%); Matisse Letherbarrow 11/11 (100%)	Report; Stats	2 Goal Shots; Helen Housby 5/7 (71%); Grace Whyte 1/1 (100%); 1 Goal Shots; Grace Nweke 64/67 (96%); Helen Housby 6/6 (100%)	Attendance: 7,258

Sunday 18 May	Melbourne Vixens	50 – 62	Sunshine Coast Lightning	John Cain Arena
4:00pm AEST	2 Goal Shots; Lily Graham 4/6 (67%); Kiera Austin 3/7 (43%); Sophie Garbin 0/1 (0%); 1 Goal Shots; Sophie Garbin 22/25 (88%); Lily Graham 7/7 (100%); Kiera Austin 7/7 (100%)	Report; Stats	2 Goal Shots; Reilley Batcheldor 2/4 (50%); Steph Fretwell 1/2 (50%); 1 Goal Shots; Reilley Batcheldor 46/48 (96%); Steph Fretwell 10/11 (91%)	Attendance: 8,445

=== Round 7 - First Nations Round (Week 1) ===
Saturday 24 May	Sunshine Coast Lightning	62 – 70	NSW Swifts	UniSC Arena
5:00pm AEST	2 Goal Shots; Steph Fretwell 4/8 (50%); Cara Koenen 3/3 (100%); Reilley Batcheldor 2/2 (100%); 1 Goal Shots; Cara Koenen 17/20 (85%); Steph Fretwell 14/17 (82%); Reilley Batcheldor 13/13 (100%)	Report; Stats	2 Goal Shots; Helen Housby 4/7 (57%); 1 Goal Shots; Grace Nweke 50/56 (89%); Helen Housby 12/13 (92%)	Attendance: 2,718

Saturday 24 May	GIANTS Netball	66 – 75	West Coast Fever	Ken Rosewall Arena
7:00pm AEST	2 Goal Shots; Matisse Letherbarrow 8/12 (67%); Sophie Dwyer 2/3 (67%); 1 Goal Shots; Matisse Letherbarrow 36/40 (90%); Sophie Dwyer 8/10 (80%); Jo Harten 2/3 (67%)	Report; Stats	2 Goal Shots; Shanice Beckford 2/2 (100%); Olivia Wilkinson 2/3 (67%); 1 Goal Shots; Jhaniele Fowler-Nembhard 63/66 (95%); Olivia Wilkinson 2/3 (67%); Shanice Beckford 2/4 (50%)	Attendance: 2,129

Sunday 25 May	Queensland Firebirds	52 – 70	Melbourne Vixens	Nissan Arena
2:00pm AEST	2 Goal Shots; Abigail Latu-Meafou 3/6 (50%); Emily Moore 2/5 (40%); 1 Goal Shots; Mary Cholhok 26/30 (87%); Emily Moore 14/17 (82%); Abigail Latu-Meafou 2/2 (100%)	Report; Stats	2 Goal Shots; Kiera Austin 5/5 (100%); Lily Graham 1/1 (100%); 1 Goal Shots; Sophie Garbin 42/45 (93%); Kiera Austin 15/18 (83%); Lily Graham 1/1 (100%)	Attendance: 4,831

Sunday 25 May	Melbourne Mavericks	59 – 66	Tarntanya Karntu	John Cain Arena
4:00pm AEST	2 Goal Shots; Uneeq Palavi 6/6 (100%); Sasha Glasgow 4/4 (100%); 1 Goal Shots; Shimona Jok 34/35 (97%); Sasha Glasgow 3/4 (75%); Uneeq Palavi 2/3 (67%)	Report; Stats	2 Goal Shots; Lauren Frew 4/5 (80%); 1 Goal Shots; Romelda Aiken-George 47/52 (90%); Lauren Frew 11/12 (92%); Kayla Graham 0/1 (0%)	Attendance: 3,086

=== Round 8 ===
Saturday 31 May	Sunshine Coast Lightning	67 – 60	Melbourne Mavericks	UniSC Arena
5:00pm AEST	2 Goal Shots; Steph Fretwell 7/7 (100%); 1 Goal Shots; Cara Koenen 45/51 (88%); Steph Fretwell 7/7 (100%); Reilley Batcheldor 1/1 (100%)	Report; Stats	2 Goal Shots; Uneeq Palavi 5/11 (45%); Shimona Jok 2/3 (67%); Sasha Glasgow 0/4 (0%); 1 Goal Shots; Shimona Jok 41/42 (98%); Sasha Glasgow 5/7 (71%)	Attendance: 2,675

Saturday 31 May	NSW Swifts	66 – 64	Adelaide Thunderbirds	Ken Rosewall Arena
7:00pm AEST	2 Goal Shots; Helen Housby 6/9 (67%); 1 Goal Shots; Grace Nweke 50/52 (96%); Helen Housby 3/3 (100%); Grace Whyte 1/1 (100%)	Report; Stats	2 Goal Shots; Lauren Frew 2/4 (50%); Georgie Horjus 1/2 (50%); 1 Goal Shots; Romelda Aiken-George 43/48 (90%); Lauren Frew 11/12 (92%); Georgie Horjus 4/4 (100%)	Attendance: 7,829

Sunday 1 June	GIANTS Netball	61 – 71	Melbourne Vixens	Ken Rosewall Arena
2:00pm AEST	2 Goal Shots; Matisse Letherbarrow 9/16 (56%); Sophie Dwyer 2/4 (50%); 1 Goal Shots; Matisse Letherbarrow 31/34 (91%); Sophie Dwyer 8/8 (100%)	Report; Stats	2 Goal Shots; Kiera Austin 6/9 (67%); 1 Goal Shots; Sophie Garbin 43/51 (84%); Kiera Austin 16/19 (84%)	Attendance: 3,076

Sunday 1 June	West Coast Fever	82 – 65	Queensland Firebirds	RAC Arena
2:00pm AWST	2 Goal Shots; Olivia Wilkinson 3/4 (75%); Shanice Beckford 1/2 (50%); Jhaniele Fowler-Nembhard 0/1 (0%); 1 Goal Shots; Jhaniele Fowler-Nembhard 68/68 (100%); Shanice Beckford 3/4 (75%); Olivia Wilkinson 3/7 (43%)	Report; Stats	2 Goal Shots; Abigail Latu-Meafou 3/4 (75%); Emily Moore 3/7 (43%); Mary Cholhok 0/1 (0%); 1 Goal Shots; Mary Cholhok 39/43 (91%); Emily Moore 9/10 (90%); Abigail Latu-Meafou 5/6 (83%)	Attendance: 11,427

=== Round 9 ===
Saturday 7 June	Queensland Firebirds	62 – 72	Sunshine Coast Lightning	Nissan Arena
5:00pm AEST	2 Goal Shots; Abigail Latu-Meafou 6/10 (60%); Emily Moore 1/6 (17%); 1 Goal Shots; Mary Cholhok 24/25 (96%); Emily Moore 17/20 (85%); Abigail Latu-Meafou 7/9 (78%)	Report; Stats	2 Goal Shots; Steph Fretwell 2/4 (50%); Reilley Batcheldor 1/1 (100%); 1 Goal Shots; Cara Koenen 54/54 (100%); Reilley Batcheldor 6/7 (86%); Steph Fretwell 6/9 (67%)	Attendance: 4,666

Saturday 7 June	NSW Swifts	68 – 79	West Coast Fever	Ken Rosewall Arena
7:00pm AEST	2 Goal Shots; Helen Housby 8/15 (53%); Grace Nweke 0/1 (0%); 1 Goal Shots; Grace Nweke 48/59 (81%); Helen Housby 4/4 (100%); Grace Whyte 0/2 (0%)	Report; Stats	2 Goal Shots; Olivia Wilkinson 2/2 (100%); 1 Goal Shots; Jhaniele Fowler-Nembhard 71/72 (99%); Shanice Beckford 3/3 (100%); Olivia Wilkinson 1/1 (100%)	Attendance: 7,832

Sunday 8 June	Melbourne Vixens	66 – 57	Melbourne Mavericks	John Cain Arena
2:00pm AEST	2 Goal Shots; Kiera Austin 1/2 (50%); 1 Goal Shots; Sophie Garbin 48/51 (94%); Kiera Austin 16/19 (84%)	Report; Stats	2 Goal Shots; Uneeq Palavi 4/9 (44%); Sasha Glasgow 3/5 (60%); Shimona Jok 0/1 (0%); 1 Goal Shots; Shimona Jok 30/31 (97%); Uneeq Palavi 8/8 (100%); Sasha Glasgow 5/5 (100%)	Attendance: 9,041

Sunday 8 June	Adelaide Thunderbirds	63 – 66	GIANTS Netball	Adelaide Entertainment Centre
3:30pm ACST	2 Goal Shots; Georgie Horjus 2/5 (40%); Kayla Graham 0/5 (0%); Lauren Frew 0/6 (0%); 1 Goal Shots; Romelda Aiken-George 49/55 (89%); Lauren Frew 6/6 (100%); Kayla Graham 3/3 (100%); Georgie Horjus 1/2 (50%)	Report; Stats	2 Goal Shots; Sophie Dwyer 4/4 (100%); Jo Harten 4/4 (100%); Matisse Letherbarrow 1/2 (50%); 1 Goal Shots; Sophie Dwyer 28/29 (97%); Jo Harten 17/17 (100%); Matisse Letherbarrow 3/4 (75%)	Attendance: 8,680

=== Round 10 ===
Saturday 14 June	Melbourne Mavericks	63 – 69	West Coast Fever	John Cain Arena
5:00pm AEST	2 Goal Shots; Uneeq Palavi 6/8 (75%); Sasha Glasgow 3/5 (60%); 1 Goal Shots; Shimona Jok 34/36 (94%); Uneeq Palavi 6/6 (100%); Sasha Glasgow 5/5 (100%)	Report; Stats	2 Goal Shots; Shanice Beckford 1/2 (50%); Jhaniele Fowler-Nembhard 0/1 (0%); Olivia Wilkinson 0/1 (0%); 1 Goal Shots; Jhaniele Fowler-Nembhard 57/57 (100%); Shanice Beckford 6/8 (75%); Olivia Wilkinson 4/5 (80%)	Attendance: 2,857

Saturday 14 June	Adelaide Thunderbirds	65 – 58	Queensland Firebirds	Adelaide Entertainment Centre
6:30pm ACST	2 Goal Shots; Georgie Horjus 3/5 (60%); Lauren Frew 1/1 (100%); 1 Goal Shots; Romelda Aiken-George 50/53 (94%); Georgie Horjus 4/5 (80%); Lauren Frew 3/3 (100%)	Report; Stats	2 Goal Shots; Abigail Latu-Meafou 6/7 (86%); Emily Moore 0/1 (0%); 1 Goal Shots; Mary Cholhok 27/33 (82%); Abigail Latu-Meafou 10/10 (100%); Emily Moore 9/11 (82%)	Attendance: 7,806

Sunday 15 June	Melbourne Vixens	70 – 68	NSW Swifts	John Cain Arena
2:00pm AEST	2 Goal Shots; Kiera Austin 3/4 (75%); 1 Goal Shots; Sophie Garbin 47/49 (96%); Kiera Austin 17/19 (89%)	Report; Stats	2 Goal Shots; Helen Housby 8/9 (89%); Sophie Fawns 4/7 (57%); 1 Goal Shots; Grace Nweke 40/43 (93%); Helen Housby 3/4 (75%); Sophie Fawns 1/1 (100%)	Attendance: 8,803

Sunday 15 June	GIANTS Netball	78 – 68	Sunshine Coast Lightning	Ken Rosewall Arena
4:00pm AEST	2 Goal Shots; Jo Harten 5/10 (50%); Sophie Dwyer 0/1 (0%); 1 Goal Shots; Jo Harten 36/37 (97%); Sophie Dwyer 32/34 (94%)	Report; Stats	2 Goal Shots; Reilley Batcheldor 5/10 (50%); Steph Fretwell 3/7 (43%); Cara Koenen 2/3 (67%); 1 Goal Shots; Cara Koenen 33/38 (87%); Reilley Batcheldor 11/13 (85%); Steph Fretwell 4/6 (67%)	Attendance: 2,980

=== Round 11 ===
Friday 20 June	West Coast Fever	68 – 63	Adelaide Thunderbirds	RAC Arena
6:00pm AWST	2 Goal Shots; Jhaniele Fowler-Nembhard 1/2 (50%); Shanice Beckford 1/2 (50%); Olivia Wilkinson 0/1 (0%); 1 Goal Shots; Jhaniele Fowler-Nembhard 62/64 (97%); Shanice Beckford 1/2 (50%); Olivia Wilkinson 1/2 (50%)	Report; Stats	2 Goal Shots; Lauren Frew 7/10 (70%); Georgie Horjus 1/2 (50%); Romelda Aiken-George 0/1 (0%); 1 Goal Shots; Romelda Aiken-George 41/46 (89%); Lauren Frew 6/8 (75%)	Attendance: 8,832

Saturday 21 June	Sunshine Coast Lightning	65 – 68	Melbourne Vixens	UniSC Arena
5:00pm AEST	2 Goal Shots; Steph Fretwell 9/12 (75%); Reilley Batcheldor 3/6 (50%); 1 Goal Shots; Reilley Batcheldor 29/32 (91%); Steph Fretwell 12/12 (100%)	Report; Stats	2 Goal Shots; Kiera Austin 1/2 (50%); 1 Goal Shots; Sophie Garbin 44/47 (94%); Kiera Austin 22/25 (88%)	Attendance: 2,782

Sunday 22 June	NSW Swifts	75 – 66	GIANTS Netball	Ken Rosewall Arena
2:00pm AEST	2 Goal Shots; Helen Housby 3/7 (43%); Sophie Fawns 3/7 (43%); 1 Goal Shots; Grace Nweke 52/59 (88%); Helen Housby 11/14 (79%)	Report; Stats	2 Goal Shots; Jo Harten 4/7 (57%); Sophie Dwyer 4/9 (44%); Matisse Letherbarrow 1/3 (33%); 1 Goal Shots; Sophie Dwyer 20/21 (95%); Jo Harten 20/22 (91%); Matisse Letherbarrow 8/8 (100%)	Attendance: 9,766

Sunday 22 June	Queensland Firebirds	54 – 65	Melbourne Mavericks	Nissan Arena
4:00pm AEST	2 Goal Shots; Abigail Latu-Meafou 4/7 (57%); Emily Moore 0/2 (0%); 1 Goal Shots; Mary Cholhok 22/28 (79%); Emily Moore 13/17 (76%); Abigail Latu-Meafou 11/12 (92%)	Report; Stats	2 Goal Shots; Sasha Glasgow 2/4 (50%); 1 Goal Shots; Shimona Jok 60/62 (97%); Sasha Glasgow 1/4 (25%)	Attendance: 4,110

=== Round 12 ===
Saturday 28 June	Sunshine Coast Lightning	54 – 69	West Coast Fever	UniSC Arena
5:00pm AEST	2 Goal Shots; Reilley Batcheldor 5/9 (56%); Steph Fretwell 3/8 (38%); 1 Goal Shots; Reilley Batcheldor 26/29 (90%); Steph Fretwell 12/15 (80%)	Report; Stats	2 Goal Shots; Jhaniele Fowler-Nembhard 2/3 (67%); Shanice Beckford 0/1 (0%); 1 Goal Shots; Jhaniele Fowler-Nembhard 49/51 (96%); Shanice Beckford 16/17 (94%)	Attendance: 2,803

Saturday 28 June	Melbourne Mavericks	68 – 64	NSW Swifts	John Cain Arena
7:00pm AEST	2 Goal Shots; Sasha Glasgow 2/2 (100%); 1 Goal Shots; Shimona Jok 61/63 (97%); Sasha Glasgow 3/5 (60%)	Report; Stats	2 Goal Shots; Sophie Fawns 3/6 (50%); Helen Housby 1/3 (33%); 1 Goal Shots; Grace Nweke 48/53 (91%); Helen Housby 5/7 (71%); Sophie Fawns 3/4 (75%)	Attendance: 4,314

Sunday 29 June	Melbourne Vixens	53 – 56	Adelaide Thunderbirds	John Cain Arena
2:00pm AEST	2 Goal Shots; Kiera Austin 3/7 (43%); Sophie Garbin 0/1 (0%); 1 Goal Shots; Sophie Garbin 38/40 (95%); Kiera Austin 9/11 (82%)	Report; Stats	2 Goal Shots; Georgie Horjus 2/2 (100%); Lauren Frew 1/2 (50%); 1 Goal Shots; Romelda Aiken-George 41/47 (87%); Georgie Horjus 5/5 (100%); Lauren Frew 4/4 (100%)	Attendance: 8,565

Sunday 29 June	Queensland Firebirds	63 – 68	GIANTS Netball	Nissan Arena
4:00pm AEST	2 Goal Shots; Abigail Latu-Meafou 4/9 (44%); Emily Moore 3/5 (60%); Mary Cholhok 1/1 (100%); 1 Goal Shots; Mary Cholhok 34/40 (85%); Abigail Latu-Meafou 11/16 (69%); Emily Moore 2/2 (100%)	Report; Stats	2 Goal Shots; Matisse Letherbarrow 4/5 (80%); Jo Harten 3/7 (43%); Sophie Dwyer 1/2 (50%); 1 Goal Shots; Jo Harten 24/25 (96%); Sophie Dwyer 24/27 (89%); Matisse Letherbarrow 4/5 (80%)	Attendance: 4,387

=== Round 13 - First Nations Round (Week 2) ===
Saturday 5 July	NSW Swifts	70 – 71	Sunshine Coast Lightning	Ken Rosewall Arena
5:00pm AEST	2 Goal Shots; Helen Housby 2/5 (40%); 1 Goal Shots; Grace Nweke 58/65 (89%); Helen Housby 8/11 (73%)	Report; Stats	2 Goal Shots; Steph Fretwell 5/9 (56%); Cara Koenen 1/3 (33%); 1 Goal Shots; Cara Koenen 47/54 (87%); Steph Fretwell 12/13 (92%)	Attendance: 9,897

Saturday 5 July	Tarntanya Karntu	60 – 49	Melbourne Mavericks	Adelaide Entertainment Centre
6:30pm ACST	2 Goal Shots; Lauren Frew 1/2 (50%); Romelda Aiken-George 0/1 (0%); Kayla Graham 0/2 (0%); 1 Goal Shots; Romelda Aiken-George 49/55 (89%); Kayla Graham 6/6 (100%); Lauren Frew 2/3 (67%); Georgie Horjus 1/1 (100%)	Report; Stats	2 Goal Shots; Uneeq Palavi 4/4 (100%); Sasha Glasgow 1/5 (20%); 1 Goal Shots; Shimona Jok 37/40 (93%); Sasha Glasgow 2/3 (67%); Uneeq Palavi 0/1 (0%)	Attendance: 8,715

Sunday 6 July	Melbourne Vixens	64 – 62	Queensland Firebirds	John Cain Arena
2:00pm AEST	2 Goal Shots; Kiera Austin 2/4 (50%); 1 Goal Shots; Sophie Garbin 42/47 (89%); Kiera Austin 18/20 (90%)	Report; Stats	2 Goal Shots; Emily Moore 3/5 (60%); Abigail Latu-Meafou 2/3 (67%); 1 Goal Shots; Mary Cholhok 43/55 (78%); Abigail Latu-Meafou 8/9 (89%); Emily Moore 1/2 (50%)	Attendance: 8,883

Sunday 6 July	West Coast Fever	73 – 56	GIANTS Netball	RAC Arena
2:00pm AWST	2 Goal Shots; Olivia Wilkinson 1/3 (33%); Shanice Beckford 0/2 (0%); 1 Goal Shots; Jhaniele Fowler-Nembhard 63/66 (95%); Olivia Wilkinson 5/6 (83%); Shanice Beckford 3/5 (60%)	Report; Stats	2 Goal Shots; Matisse Letherbarrow 5/11 (45%); Jo Harten 4/8 (50%); Sophie Dwyer 1/4 (25%); 1 Goal Shots; Jo Harten 20/23 (87%); Sophie Dwyer 14/18 (78%); Matisse Letherbarrow 2/2 (100%)	Attendance: 11,899

=== Round 14 ===
Saturday 12 July	GIANTS Netball	74 – 59	Melbourne Mavericks	Ken Rosewall Arena
5:00pm AEST	2 Goal Shots; Jo Harten 7/11 (64%); Sophie Dwyer 3/7 (43%); 1 Goal Shots; Sophie Dwyer 28/29 (97%); Jo Harten 26/28 (93%)	Report; Stats	2 Goal Shots; Sasha Glasgow 5/7 (71%); Uneeq Palavi 0/4 (0%); 1 Goal Shots; Shimona Jok 40/42 (95%); Sasha Glasgow 8/8 (100%); Uneeq Palavi 1/1 (100%)	Attendance: 5,223

Saturday 12 July	Adelaide Thunderbirds	59 – 55	Sunshine Coast Lightning	Adelaide Entertainment Centre
6:30pm ACST	2 Goal Shots; Lauren Frew 1/3 (33%); 1 Goal Shots; Romelda Aiken-George 43/54 (80%); Lauren Frew 12/12 (100%); Georgie Horjus 2/2 (100%)	Report; Stats	2 Goal Shots; Cara Koenen 4/4 (100%); Reilley Batcheldor 3/5 (60%); Steph Fretwell 0/3 (0%); 1 Goal Shots; Cara Koenen 29/30 (97%); Reilley Batcheldor 6/6 (100%); Steph Fretwell 6/7 (86%)	Attendance: 8,817

Sunday 13 July	Queensland Firebirds	75 – 79 (ET)	NSW Swifts	Nissan Arena
2:00pm AEST	2 Goal Shots; Emily Moore 6/10 (60%); Mary Cholhok 1/2 (50%); 1 Goal Shots; Mary Cholhok 47/54 (87%); Emily Moore 13/15 (87%); Elsa Sif Sandholt 1/2 (50%)	Report; Stats	2 Goal Shots; Helen Housby 6/8 (75%); 1 Goal Shots; Grace Nweke 59/66 (89%); Helen Housby 8/10 (80%)	Attendance: 4,776

Sunday 13 July	West Coast Fever	71 – 60	Melbourne Vixens	RAC Arena
2:00pm AWST	2 Goal Shots; Jhaniele Fowler-Nembhard 1/3 (33%); Olivia Wilkinson 1/4 (25%); Shanice Beckford 0/1 (0%); 1 Goal Shots; Jhaniele Fowler-Nembhard 60/60 (100%); Shanice Beckford 5/5 (100%); Olivia Wilkinson 2/2 (100%)	Report; Stats	2 Goal Shots; Kiera Austin 6/10 (60%); Lily Graham 2/6 (33%); Sophie Garbin 0/1 (0%); 1 Goal Shots; Sophie Garbin 28/29 (97%); Kiera Austin 16/17 (94%)	Attendance: 12,813

== Ladder ==
2025 Suncorp Super Netball ladder
Pos	Team	P	W	D	L	GF	GA	%	PTS
1	West Coast Fever	14	12	0	2	969	874	110.87	48
2	NSW Swifts	14	10	0	4	972	906	107.28	40
3	Adelaide Thunderbirds	14	8	0	6	865	821	105.36	32
4	Melbourne Vixens	14	8	0	6	861	860	100.12	32
5	Sunshine Coast Lightning	14	7	0	7	894	879	101.71	28
6	GIANTS Netball	14	5	0	9	892	960	92.92	20
7	Melbourne Mavericks	14	4	0	10	863	922	93.60	16
8	Queensland Firebirds	14	2	0	12	850	944	90.04	8
Last updated: Sunday 13 July 2025 — Source

== Finals Series ==
=== Minor Semi Final ===
Sunday 20 July; 1:30pm ACST	Report; Stats	Adelaide Thunderbirds (3)	56–58	Melbourne Vixens (4)	Adelaide Entertainment Centre; Attendance: 8,757; Umpires: Rachael Stebbings, Tamara Buriani-Gennai; Reserve umpire: Justin Barnes	Foxtel, Kayo Sports, Binge
Sunday 20 July; 1:30pm ACST	Report; Stats	Scoring by quarter: 11-13, 14-15, 17-18, 14-12			Adelaide Entertainment Centre; Attendance: 8,757; Umpires: Rachael Stebbings, Tamara Buriani-Gennai; Reserve umpire: Justin Barnes	Foxtel, Kayo Sports, Binge
Sunday 20 July; 1:30pm ACST	Report; Stats	Scoring by half: 25-28, 31-30			Adelaide Entertainment Centre; Attendance: 8,757; Umpires: Rachael Stebbings, Tamara Buriani-Gennai; Reserve umpire: Justin Barnes	Foxtel, Kayo Sports, Binge
Sunday 20 July; 1:30pm ACST	Report; Stats	2 Goal Shots; Georgie Horjus 6/9 (67%); Lauren Frew 0/1 (0%); 1 Goal Shots; Romelda Aiken-George 37/42 (88%); Lauren Frew 5/5 (100%); Georgie Horjus 2/3 (67%)		2 Goal Shots; Kiera Austin 5/5 (100%); 1 Goal Shots; Sophie Garbin 39/42 (93%); Kiera Austin 9/13 (69%)	Adelaide Entertainment Centre; Attendance: 8,757; Umpires: Rachael Stebbings, Tamara Buriani-Gennai; Reserve umpire: Justin Barnes	Foxtel, Kayo Sports, Binge

=== Major Semi Final ===
Sunday 20 July; 2:00pm AWST	Report; Stats	West Coast Fever (1)	77–45	NSW Swifts (2)	RAC Arena; Attendance: 11,838; Umpires: Tara Warner, Jemma Cook; Reserve umpire: Georgina Sulley-Beales	Foxtel, Kayo Sports, Binge
Sunday 20 July; 2:00pm AWST	Report; Stats	Scoring by quarter: 20-11, 26-9, 17-15, 14-10			RAC Arena; Attendance: 11,838; Umpires: Tara Warner, Jemma Cook; Reserve umpire: Georgina Sulley-Beales	Foxtel, Kayo Sports, Binge
Sunday 20 July; 2:00pm AWST	Report; Stats	Scoring by half: 46-20, 31-25			RAC Arena; Attendance: 11,838; Umpires: Tara Warner, Jemma Cook; Reserve umpire: Georgina Sulley-Beales	Foxtel, Kayo Sports, Binge
Sunday 20 July; 2:00pm AWST	Report; Stats	2 Goal Shots; Jhaniele Fowler-Nembhard 1/2 (50%); Olivia Wilkinson 1/4 (25%); Shanice Beckford 0/1 (0%); 1 Goal Shots; Jhaniele Fowler-Nembhard 65/66 (98%); Olivia Wilkinson 4/5 (80%); Shanice Beckford 4/5 (80%)		2 Goal Shots; Helen Housby 4/5 (80%); Sophie Fawns 1/3 (33%); 1 Goal Shots; Grace Nweke 23/28 (82%); Sophie Fawns 8/10 (80%); Helen Housby 4/4 (100%)	RAC Arena; Attendance: 11,838; Umpires: Tara Warner, Jemma Cook; Reserve umpire: Georgina Sulley-Beales	Foxtel, Kayo Sports, Binge

=== Preliminary Final ===
Sunday 27 July; 2:00pm AEST	Report; Stats	NSW Swifts (2)	65–66	Melbourne Vixens (4)	Qudos Bank Arena; Attendance: 7,213; Umpires: Tamara Buriani-Gennai, Tara Warner; Reserve umpire: Jemma Cook	Foxtel, Kayo Sports, Binge
Sunday 27 July; 2:00pm AEST	Report; Stats	Scoring by quarter: 12-15, 19-14, 20-12, 14-25			Qudos Bank Arena; Attendance: 7,213; Umpires: Tamara Buriani-Gennai, Tara Warner; Reserve umpire: Jemma Cook	Foxtel, Kayo Sports, Binge
Sunday 27 July; 2:00pm AEST	Report; Stats	Scoring by half: 31-29, 34-37			Qudos Bank Arena; Attendance: 7,213; Umpires: Tamara Buriani-Gennai, Tara Warner; Reserve umpire: Jemma Cook	Foxtel, Kayo Sports, Binge
Sunday 27 July; 2:00pm AEST	Report; Stats	2 Goal Shots; Helen Housby 1/2 (50%); 1 Goal Shots; Grace Nweke 53/58 (91%); Helen Housby 10/12 (83%)		2 Goal Shots; Kiera Austin 4/5 (80%); Lily Graham 2/4 (50%); 1 Goal Shots; Sophie Garbin 46/47 (98%); Kiera Austin 8/11 (73%)	Qudos Bank Arena; Attendance: 7,213; Umpires: Tamara Buriani-Gennai, Tara Warner; Reserve umpire: Jemma Cook	Foxtel, Kayo Sports, Binge

=== Grand Final ===
Saturday 2 August; 7:30pm AEST	Report; Stats	West Coast Fever (1)	58–59	Melbourne Vixens (4)	Rod Laver Arena; Attendance: 15,013; Umpires: Tamara Buriani-Gennai, Tara Warner; Reserve umpire: Jemma Cook	Foxtel, Kayo Sports, Binge
Saturday 2 August; 7:30pm AEST	Report; Stats	Scoring by quarter: 16-17, 15-16, 12-15, 15-11			Rod Laver Arena; Attendance: 15,013; Umpires: Tamara Buriani-Gennai, Tara Warner; Reserve umpire: Jemma Cook	Foxtel, Kayo Sports, Binge
Saturday 2 August; 7:30pm AEST	Report; Stats	Scoring by half: 31-33, 27-26			Rod Laver Arena; Attendance: 15,013; Umpires: Tamara Buriani-Gennai, Tara Warner; Reserve umpire: Jemma Cook	Foxtel, Kayo Sports, Binge
Saturday 2 August; 7:30pm AEST	Report; Stats	2 Goal Shots; Jhaniele Fowler-Nembhard 1/1 (100%); 1 Goal Shots; Jhaniele Fowler-Nembhard 50/50 (100%); Shanice Beckford 4/4 (100%); Olivia Wilkinson 2/3 (67%)		2 Goal Shots; Kiera Austin 3/6 (50%); 1 Goal Shots; Sophie Garbin 33/36 (92%); Kiera Austin 20/21 (95%)	Rod Laver Arena; Attendance: 15,013; Umpires: Tamara Buriani-Gennai, Tara Warner; Reserve umpire: Jemma Cook	Foxtel, Kayo Sports, Binge
Saturday 2 August; 7:30pm AEST	Report; Stats	Grand Final MVP: Kiera Austin			Rod Laver Arena; Attendance: 15,013; Umpires: Tamara Buriani-Gennai, Tara Warner; Reserve umpire: Jemma Cook	Foxtel, Kayo Sports, Binge

== Awards ==
The following players, coaches and umpires were awarded by Netball Australia for performances in the 2025 season:

- The Player of the Year Award was won by Jhaniele Fowler-Nembhard of the West Coast Fever.
- The Grand Final MVP Award was won by Kiera Austin of the Melbourne Vixens.
- The Rookie of the Year Award was won by Sophie Casey of the Adelaide Thunderbirds.
- The Joyce Brown Coach of the Year award was won by Simone McKinnis of the Melbourne Vixens.
- The Lorna McConchie Umpire of the Year award was won by Tara Warner of New South Wales.
- The Leading Goalscorer Award was won by Jhaniele Fowler-Nembhard of the West Coast Fever, who scored 724 points in the regular season.
- The Australian Netball Players' Association (ANPA) Heart of the Game Award was won by Tayla Williams of the Adelaide Thunderbirds.
- The following players were named in the Super Netball Team of the Year:

Attackers

- Goal Shooter: Jhaniele Fowler-Nembhard
  (West Coast Fever)
- Goal Attack: Kiera Austin
  (Melbourne Vixens)

Midcourters

- Wing Attack: Alice Teague-Neeld
  (West Coast Fever)
- Centre: Paige Hadley
  (New South Wales Swifts)
- Wing Defence: Amy Sligar
  (GIANTS Netball)

Defenders

- Goal Defence: Latanya Wilson
  (Adelaide Thunderbirds)
- Goal Keeper: Teigan O'Shannassy
  (New South Wales Swifts)

Reserves

- Attack Reserve: Grace Nweke
  (New South Wales Swifts)
- Midcourt Reserve: Liz Watson
  (Sunshine Coast Lightning)
- Defence Reserve: Sunday Aryang
  (West Coast Fever)
