= 2025 Constellation Cup =

International netball series

Tournament details
- Host countries: Australia; New Zealand
- Dates: 17–29 October 2025
- TV partner(s): Sky Sport (New Zealand); Fox Sports (Australia); NetballPass

Final positions
- Champions: Australia (12th title)
- Runners-up: New Zealand

Tournament statistics
- Matches played: 4
- Top scorer(s): Grace Nweke; 183/201 (91%)

The 2025 Constellation Cup was the 15th Constellation Cup series between Australia and New Zealand. It featured four netball test matches, played in October 2025. The Australia team were coached by Stacey Marinkovich and captained by Liz Watson. The New Zealand team was coached by Yvette McCausland-Durie and captained by Karin Burger. Australia won the first two tests and led 2–0 going into the third test. However, New Zealand won the third and fourth tests to level the series at 2–2. The series was decided by a special extra-time period. The Series Decider took place immediately following the conclusion of the fourth and final test of the series. The decider was a 14-minute period of extra time, consisting of two seven-minute halves, with the score resetting to 0–0. Australia won the decider 12–11 with just four seconds remaining when Sophie Garbin scored the winning goal. The main broadcasters for the series were Sky Sport (New Zealand), Fox Sports (Australia) and NetballPass worldwide. It was also available to watch on Foxtel channels and services including Kayo Freebies and Binge.

== Squads ==
=== Australia ===
Australia roster
Players
Coaches

Name	Pos	DOB	Height	Club	Nat	Caps
Sunday Aryang	GD	25 December 2000 (aged 24)	1.82 m (6 ft 0 in)	West Coast Fever
Kiera Austin	GS, GA, WA	26 August 1997 (aged 28)	1.85 m (6 ft 1 in)	Melbourne Vixens
Courtney Bruce	GK, GD	8 December 1993 (aged 31)	1.89 m (6 ft 2 in)	Sunshine Coast Lightning
Sophie Dwyer	GA	5 December 2001 (aged 23)	1.83 m (6 ft 0 in)	Giants Netball
Ashleigh Ervin	GK, GD	15 May 2003 (aged 22)	1.92 m (6 ft 4 in)	Sunshine Coast Lightning
Sophie Garbin	GS, GA	6 April 1997 (aged 28)	1.84 m (6 ft 0 in)	Melbourne Vixens
Matilda Garrett	GK, GD	11 August 1998 (aged 27)	1.85 m (6 ft 1 in)	Adelaide Thunderbirds
Georgie Horjus	GA, WA	28 January 2002 (aged 23)	1.72 m (5 ft 8 in)	Adelaide Thunderbirds
Sarah Klau	GK, GD	30 September 1994 (aged 31)	1.90 m (6 ft 3 in)	New South Wales Swifts
Cara Koenen	GS, GA	27 February 1996 (aged 29)	1.90 m (6 ft 3 in)	Sunshine Coast Lightning
Kate Moloney (vc)	WD, C, WA	8 January 1993 (aged 32)	1.77 m (5 ft 10 in)	Melbourne Vixens
Hannah Mundy	C, WA, WD	10 June 2001 (aged 24)	1.81 m (5 ft 11 in)	Melbourne Vixens
Amy Parmenter	WD	1 August 1997 (aged 28)	1.76 m (5 ft 9 in)	Melbourne Mavericks
Jamie-Lee Price	WD, C	10 January 1996 (aged 29)	1.79 m (5 ft 10 in)	Melbourne Mavericks
Liz Watson (c)	WA, C	30 March 1994 (aged 30)	1.78 m (5 ft 10 in)	Sunshine Coast Lightning

Head coach

- Stacey Marinkovich

Notes

- (c) – Captain
- (cc) – Co-captain
- (vc) – Vice-captain
- – Injury / maternity leave
- (TRP) – Temporary Replacement Player

=== New Zealand ===
New Zealand roster
Players
Coaches

Name	Pos	DOB	Height	Club	Nat	Caps
Karin Burger (c)	WD, GD, GK	12 April 1993 (aged 32)	1.84 m (6 ft 0 in)	Mainland Tactix	(New Zealand)
Maddy Gordon	C, WA, WD	16 January 2000 (aged 25)	1.74 m (5 ft 9 in)	Central Pulse	(New Zealand)
Catherine Hall	GK,GD	16 December 2003 (aged 21)	1.91 m (6 ft 3 in)	Northern Mystics	(New Zealand)
Georgia Heffernan	GS, GA	7 October 1999 (aged 26)	1.81 m (5 ft 11 in)	Southern Steel	(New Zealand)
Kate Heffernan	WD, C, WA	7 October 1999 (aged 26)	1.81 m (5 ft 11 in)	Southern Steel	(New Zealand)
Kelly Jackson (vc)	GK, GD	22 October 1996 (aged 28)	1.92 m (6 ft 4 in)	Central Pulse	(New Zealand)
Paris Mason	GK, GD, WD	13 December 2002 (aged 22)	1.84 m (6 ft 0 in)	Central Pulse	(New Zealand)
Grace Nweke	GS	7 February 2002 (aged 23)	1.93 m (6 ft 4 in)	New South Wales Swifts	(Australia)
Kimiora Poi	C, WA	1 November 1997 (aged 27)	1.68 m (5 ft 6 in)	Southern Steel	(New Zealand)
Mila Reulu-Buchanan	C, WA	11 May 1998 (aged 27)	1.73 m (5 ft 8 in)	Northern Stars	(New Zealand)
Martina Salmon	GS, GA		1.90 m (6 ft 3 in)	Mainland Tactix	(New Zealand)
Carys Stythe	GD, GK	June 18, 2003 (aged 22)	1.92 m (6 ft 4 in)	Southern Steel	(New Zealand)
Elisapeta Toeava	WA, C	10 March 1994 (aged 31)	1.61 m (5 ft 3 in)	Northern Mystics	(New Zealand)
Amelia Walmsley	GS, GA	31 January 2004 (aged 21)	1.92 m (6 ft 4 in)	Central Pulse	(New Zealand)

Head coach

- Yvette McCausland-Durie

Assistant coach

- Liana Leota

Notes

- (c) – Captain
- (cc) – Co-captain
- (vc) – Vice-captain
- – Injury / maternity leave
- (TRP) – Temporary Replacement Player

== Match officials ==
=== Umpires ===
Umpire	Association
Gary Burgess	England
Alison Harrison	Wales
Louise Travis	England

=== Umpire Appointments Panel ===
Umpire	Association
Jacqui Jashari	Australia
Fay Meiklejohn	New Zealand

== Matches ==
=== First test ===
Friday, 17 October 2025; 19:30 AEDT	Stats	Australia	69–52	New Zealand	John Cain Arena
Friday, 17 October 2025; 19:30 AEDT	Stats	Scoring by quarter: 13–13, 30–28, 45–41, 69–52			John Cain Arena
Friday, 17 October 2025; 19:30 AEDT	Stats	Sophie Garbin 42/45 (93%); Kiera Austin 27/32 (84%)		Grace Nweke 37/41 (90%); Martina Salmon 12/15 (80%); Amelia Walmsley 3/4 (75%)	John Cain Arena

=== Second test ===
Wednesday, 22 October 2025; 19:30 AEDT	Stats	Australia	68–51	New Zealand	Qudos Bank Arena
Wednesday, 22 October 2025; 19:30 AEDT	Stats	Scoring by quarter: 19–13, 30–28, 51–37, 68–51			Qudos Bank Arena
Wednesday, 22 October 2025; 19:30 AEDT	Stats	Sophie Garbin 33/39 (85%); Georgie Horjus 13/19 (68%); Kiera Austin 11/12 (92%); Cara Koenen 11/15 (73%)		Grace Nweke 37/43 (86%); Georgia Heffernan 10/11 (91%); Martina Salmon 4/4 (100%)	Qudos Bank Arena

=== Third test ===
Sunday, 26 October 2025; 16:10 NZST	Stats	New Zealand	61–52	Australia	Globox Arena
Sunday, 26 October 2025; 16:10 NZST	Stats	Scoring by quarter: 13–12, 29–28, 49–39, 61–52			Globox Arena
Sunday, 26 October 2025; 16:10 NZST	Stats	Grace Nweke 44/46 (96%); Amelia Walmsley 10/13 (77%); Georgia Heffernan 6/6 (100%); Martina Salmon 1/2 (50%)		Sophie Garbin 22/24 (92%); Kiera Austin 19/21 (90%); Sophie Dwyer 6/6 (100%); Cara Koenen 5/7 (71%)	Globox Arena

=== Fourth test ===
Wednesday, 29 October 2025; 19:40 NZST	Stats	New Zealand	62–57	Australia	Wolfbrook Arena
Wednesday, 29 October 2025; 19:40 NZST	Stats	Scoring by quarter: 12–17, 26–33, 43–46, 62–57			Wolfbrook Arena
Wednesday, 29 October 2025; 19:40 NZST	Stats	Grace Nweke 56/59 (95%); Georgia Heffernan 4/4 (100%); Martina Salmon 1/1 (100%); Amelia Walmsley 1/2 (50%)		Sophie Garbin 29/35 (83%); Kiera Austin 22/29 (76%); Sophie Dwyer 5/5 (100%); Georgie Horjus 1/2 (50%)	Wolfbrook Arena

==== Series Decider ====
Stats	New Zealand	11–12	Australia
Stats	Grace Nweke 9/12 (75%); Georgia Heffernan 2/3 (67%)		Sophie Garbin 6/7 (86%); Kiera Austin 6/9 (67%)
