= 2021 Constellation Cup =

International netball series

Tournament details
- Host country: New Zealand
- Dates: 2 March–7 March 2021

Final positions
- Champions: New Zealand (2nd title)
- Runners-up: Australia

Tournament statistics
- Matches played: 4
- Top scorer(s): Maia Wilson; 140/161 (87%)

The 2021 Constellation Cup, also known as the Cadbury Netball Series, was the 11th Constellation Cup series between New Zealand and Australia. The series featured four netball test matches, played in March 2021. Because of the COVID-19 pandemic, all four matches were hosted at the Christchurch Arena and only the final match was played with spectators in attendance. The series was won by New Zealand, who defeated Australia by three games to one, winning the Constellation Cup for the second time and for the first time since 2012.

== Squads ==
=== Australia ===
Australia roster
Players
Coaches

Name	Pos	DOB	Height	Club	Nat	Caps
Jessica Anstiss	WD, C	20 November 1996 (aged 24)	1.71 m (5 ft 7 in)	West Coast Fever	(Australia)	0
Kiera Austin	GA, WA, GS	26 August 1997 (aged 23)	1.84 m (6 ft 0 in)	Giants Netball	(Australia)	4
Caitlin Bassett^{1} (c)	GS	23 May 1988 (aged 32)	1.95 m (6 ft 5 in)	Waikato Bay of Plenty Magic	(New Zealand)	102
Courtney Bruce	GK, GD	8 December 1993 (aged 27)	1.89 m (6 ft 2 in)	West Coast Fever	(Australia)	40
Verity Charles	WA, C	19 May 1991 (aged 29)	1.70 m (5 ft 7 in)	West Coast Fever	(Australia)	3
Tippah Dwan	GA, GS	30 October 1999 (aged 21)	1.78 m (5 ft 10 in)	Queensland Firebirds	(Australia)	0
Sophie Garbin	GS, GA	6 April 1997 (aged 23)	1.84 m (6 ft 0 in)	New South Wales Swifts	(Australia)	1
Paige Hadley^{2}	C, WA, WD	26 August 1992 (aged 28)	1.73 m (5 ft 8 in)	New South Wales Swifts	(Australia)	28
Kim Jenner	GD, GK	27 February 1998 (aged 23)	1.84 m (6 ft 0 in)	Queensland Firebirds	(Australia)	0
Sarah Klau	GK, GD	30 September 1994 (aged 26)	1.90 m (6 ft 3 in)	New South Wales Swifts	(Australia)	13
Cara Koenen	GS, GA	27 February 1996 (aged 25)	1.90 m (6 ft 3 in)	Sunshine Coast Lightning	(Australia)	4
Jamie-Lee Price	WD, C	10 January 1996 (aged 25)	1.79 m (5 ft 10 in)	Giants Netball	(Australia)	16
Maddy Proud^{2}	WA, C	4 December 1993 (aged 27)	1.74 m (5 ft 9 in)	New South Wales Swifts	(Australia)	0
Kate Moloney	C, WD	8 January 1993 (aged 28)	1.77 m (5 ft 10 in)	Melbourne Vixens	(Australia)	10
Gabi Simpson	WD, C, GD	17 October 1992 (aged 28)	1.76 m (5 ft 9 in)	Queensland Firebirds	(Australia)	41
Liz Watson^{1} (c)	WA, C	30 March 1994 (aged 26)	1.78 m (5 ft 10 in)	Melbourne Vixens	(Australia)	48
Joanna Weston	GD, WD, GK	14 February 1994 (aged 27)	1.88 m (6 ft 2 in)	Melbourne Vixens	(Australia)	42

Head coach

- Stacey Marinkovich

Assistant coach

- Michelle Den Dekker
  Sharelle McMahon

Notes

- (c) – Captain
- (cc) – Co-captain
- (vc) – Vice-captain
- – Injury / maternity leave
- (TRP) – Temporary Replacement Player

Notes

- ^1 Caitlin Bassett captained Australia for the first test on 2 March. Liz Watson captained Australia for the last three.
- ^2 Maddy Proud and Paige Hadley were included in squad but did not play any in any of the tests.

=== New Zealand ===
New Zealand roster
Players
Coaches

Name	Pos	DOB	Height	Club	Nat	Caps
Karin Burger	WD, GD, GK	12 April 1993 (aged 27)	1.84 m (6 ft 0 in)	Mainland Tactix	(New Zealand)	26
Gina Crampton	WA, C	7 December 1991 (aged 29)	1.74 m (5 ft 9 in)	Northern Stars	(New Zealand)	47
Ameliaranne Ekenasio (c)	GA, GS	11 January 1991 (aged 30)	1.86 m (6 ft 1 in)	Central Pulse	(New Zealand)	47
Monica Falkner	GA, GS	8 April 1991 (aged 29)	1.81 m (5 ft 11 in)	Northern Stars	(New Zealand)	3
Sulu Fitzpatrick	GK, GD, WD	20 August 1992 (aged 28)	1.88 m (6 ft 2 in)	Northern Mystics	(New Zealand)	10
Maddy Gordon	C, WA, WD	16 January 2000 (aged 21)	1.74 m (5 ft 9 in)	Central Pulse	(New Zealand)	1
Claire Kersten	WD, C	9 July 1989 (aged 31)	1.75 m (5 ft 9 in)	Central Pulse	(New Zealand)	15
Bailey Mes	GS, GA, WA	27 May 1989 (aged 31)	1.86 m (6 ft 1 in)	Northern Mystics	(New Zealand)	72
Kimiora Poi	C, WA	1 November 1997 (aged 23)	1.68 m (5 ft 6 in)	Mainland Tactix	(New Zealand)	7
Shannon Saunders	C, WA	12 October 1990 (aged 30)	1.78 m (5 ft 10 in)	Southern Steel	(New Zealand)	81
Whitney Souness	WA, C	12 October 1991 (aged 29)	1.74 m (5 ft 9 in)	Central Pulse	(New Zealand)	14
Jane Watson	GK, GD	7 March 1990 (aged 30)	1.81 m (5 ft 11 in)	Mainland Tactix	(New Zealand)	52
Maia Wilson	GS, GA	21 September 1997 (aged 23)	1.87 m (6 ft 2 in)	Northern Stars	(New Zealand)	21
Samantha Winders	WD, C, WA	5 June 1995 (aged 25)	1.71 m (5 ft 7 in)	Waikato Bay of Plenty Magic	(New Zealand)	41

Head coach

- Noeline Taurua

Assistant coach

- Yvonne Willering
  Jane Woodlands-Thompson

Manager: Esther Molloy

Notes

- (c) – Captain
- (cc) – Co-captain
- (vc) – Vice-captain
- – Injury / maternity leave
- (TRP) – Temporary Replacement Player

== Match officials ==
Because of the COVID-19 pandemic, Australia and New Zealand umpires took charge of the series. In 2020, the International Netball Federation introduced an interim policy to allow umpires to be appointed to games involving their own country, if it was too impractical to get umpires in from overseas.

=== Umpires ===
Umpire	Association
Joshua Bowring	Australia
Gareth Fowler	New Zealand
Kristie Simpson	New Zealand

=== Umpire Appointments Panel ===
Umpire	Association
David Pala'amo	New Zealand
Fay Meiklejohn	New Zealand

== Matches ==
=== First test ===
2 March 2021; 7:30 pm	Stats	New Zealand	49–44	Australia	Christchurch Arena	Sky Sport; Nine
2 March 2021; 7:30 pm	Stats	Scoring by quarter: 14–10, 28–21, 40–31, 49–44			Christchurch Arena	Sky Sport; Nine
2 March 2021; 7:30 pm	Stats	Maia Wilson 31/40 (78%); Ameliaranne Ekenasio 18/23 (78%)		Caitlin Bassett 19/21 (90%); Kiera Austin 18/24 (75%); Cara Koenen 7/7 (100%)	Christchurch Arena	Sky Sport; Nine

=== Second test ===
3 March 2021; 7:30 pm	Stats	New Zealand	36–45	Australia	Christchurch Arena	Sky Sport; Nine
3 March 2021; 7:30 pm	Stats	Scoring by quarter: 6–15, 16–30, 28–38, 36–45			Christchurch Arena	Sky Sport; Nine
3 March 2021; 7:30 pm	Stats	Maia Wilson 32/38 (84%); Bailey Mes 3/5 (60%); Monica Falkner 1/2 (50%)		Cara Koenen 29/34 (85%); Kiera Austin 13/24 (54%); Sophie Garbin 3/6 (50%)	Christchurch Arena	Sky Sport; Nine

=== Third test ===
6 March 2021; 4:00 pm	Stats	New Zealand	55–49	Australia	Christchurch Arena	Sky Sport; Nine
6 March 2021; 4:00 pm	Stats	Scoring by quarter: 11–14, 24–29, 38–40, 55–49			Christchurch Arena	Sky Sport; Nine
6 March 2021; 4:00 pm	Stats	Maia Wilson 41/43 (95%); Ameliaranne Ekenasio 14/17 (82%)		Cara Koenen 25/29 (86%); Kiera Austin 18/27 (67%); Caitlin Bassett 6/7 (86%)	Christchurch Arena	Sky Sport; Nine

=== Fourth test ===
7 March 2021; 4:00 pm	Stats	New Zealand	45–43	Australia	Christchurch Arena; Attendance: 2,500	Sky Sport; Nine
7 March 2021; 4:00 pm	Stats	Scoring by quarter: 6–12, 17–22, 30–31, 45–43			Christchurch Arena; Attendance: 2,500	Sky Sport; Nine
7 March 2021; 4:00 pm	Stats	Maia Wilson 36/40 (90%); Ameliaranne Ekenasio 9/12 (75%)		Kiera Austin 28/35 (80%); Cara Koenen 15/19 (79%)	Christchurch Arena; Attendance: 2,500	Sky Sport; Nine
