= 2023 Constellation Cup =

International netball series

Tournament details
- Host countries: Australia; New Zealand
- Dates: 12–23 October 2023
- TV partner(s): Sky Sport (New Zealand); Foxtel

Final positions
- Champions: Australia (11th title)
- Runners-up: New Zealand

Tournament statistics
- Matches played: 4
- Top scorer(s): Grace Nweke; 98/105 (93%)

The 2023 Constellation Cup was the 13th Constellation Cup series between Australia and New Zealand. It featured four netball test matches, played in October 2023. The Australia team were coached by Stacey Marinkovich and captained by Liz Watson. The New Zealand team were coached by Noeline Taurua and captained by Ameliaranne Ekenasio. The second test was Australia's 500th international test match. Australia won the first two tests and led 2–0 going into the third test. However, New Zealand won the third and fourth tests to level the series at 2–2. Australia were declared the series winners and retained the Constellation Cup based on aggregate score.

== Squads ==
=== Australia ===
Australia roster
Players
Coaches

Name	Pos	DOB	Height	Club	Nat	Caps
Sunday Aryang	GD	25 December 2000 (aged 22)	1.82 m (6 ft 0 in)	West Coast Fever
Kiera Austin	GS, GA, WA	26 August 1997 (aged 26)	1.85 m (6 ft 1 in)	Melbourne Vixens
Courtney Bruce	GK, GD	8 December 1993 (aged 29)	1.89 m (6 ft 2 in)	West Coast Fever
Sophie Dwyer	GA	5 December 2001 (aged 21)	1.83 m (6 ft 0 in)	Giants Netball
Sophie Garbin	GS, GA	6 April 1997 (aged 26)	1.84 m (6 ft 0 in)	Collingwood Magpies
Paige Hadley (vc)	C, WA, WD	26 August 1992 (aged 31)	1.73 m (5 ft 8 in)	New South Wales Swifts
Sarah Klau	GK, GD	30 September 1994 (aged 29)	1.90 m (6 ft 3 in)	New South Wales Swifts
Cara Koenen	GS, GA	27 February 1996 (aged 27)	1.90 m (6 ft 3 in)	Sunshine Coast Lightning
Kate Moloney	WD, C, WA	8 January 1993 (aged 30)	1.77 m (5 ft 10 in)	Melbourne Vixens
Jamie-Lee Price	WD, C	10 January 1996 (aged 27)	1.79 m (5 ft 10 in)	Giants Netball
Liz Watson (c)	WA, C	30 March 1994 (aged 29)	1.78 m (5 ft 10 in)	Melbourne Vixens
Joanna Weston	GD, WD, GK	14 February 1994 (aged 29)	1.88 m (6 ft 2 in)	Melbourne Vixens

Head coach

- Stacey Marinkovich

Notes

- (c) – Captain
- (cc) – Co-captain
- (vc) – Vice-captain
- – Injury / maternity leave
- (TRP) – Temporary Replacement Player

Milestones

- On 15 October 2023, during the second test, Paige Hadley made her 50th senior international appearance for Australia.

=== New Zealand ===
New Zealand roster
Players
Coaches

Name	Pos	DOB	Height	Club	Nat	Caps
Karin Burger	WD, GD, GK	12 April 1993 (aged 30)	1.84 m (6 ft 0 in)	Mainland Tactix
Kate Burley	GD, GK	23 April 1997 (aged 26)	1.81 m (5 ft 11 in)	Southern Steel
Ameliaranne Ekenasio (c)	GA, GS	11 January 1991 (aged 32)	1.86 m (6 ft 1 in)	Waikato Bay of Plenty Magic
Maddy Gordon	C, WA, WD	16 January 2000 (aged 23)	1.74 m (5 ft 9 in)	Central Pulse
Kate Heffernan	WD, C, WA	7 October 1999 (aged 24)	1.81 m (5 ft 11 in)	Southern Steel
Kelly Jury	GK, GD	22 October 1996 (aged 26)	1.92 m (6 ft 4 in)	Central Pulse
Phoenix Karaka (vc)	GK, GD	6 November 1993 (aged 29)	1.86 m (6 ft 1 in)	Northern Mystics
Tiana Metuarau	GA, WA, GS	15 January 2001 (aged 22)	1.83 m (6 ft 0 in)	Central Pulse
Grace Nweke	GS	7 February 2002 (aged 21)	1.93 m (6 ft 4 in)	Northern Mystics
Mila Reuelu-Buchanan	WA, C	11 May 1998 (aged 25)	1.72 m (5 ft 8 in)	Northern Stars
Whitney Souness	C, WA	12 November 1995 (aged 27)	1.74 m (5 ft 9 in)	Central Pulse
Amelia Walmsley	GS, GA	31 January 2004 (aged 19)	1.92 m (6 ft 4 in)	Central Pulse
Jane Watson	GK, GD	7 March 1990 (aged 33)	1.81 m (5 ft 11 in)	Mainland Tactix
Maia Wilson	GS, GA	21 September 1997 (aged 26)	1.87 m (6 ft 2 in)	Northern Stars

Head coach

- Noeline Taurua

Notes

- (c) – Captain
- (cc) – Co-captain
- (vc) – Vice-captain
- – Injury / maternity leave
- (TRP) – Temporary Replacement Player

Milestones

- On 23 October 2023, during the fourth test, Karin Burger made her 50th senior international appearance for the New Zealand.

== Match officials ==
=== Umpires ===
Umpire	Association
Gary Burgess	England
Louise Travis	England
Alison Harrison	Wales

=== Umpire Appointments Panel ===
Umpire	Association
Jacqui Jashari	Australia
Kirsten Lloyd	New Zealand
Fay Meiklejohn	New Zealand

== Matches ==
=== First test ===
12 October 2023; 7:30pm AEDT (UTC+11)	Stats	Australia	50–40	New Zealand	John Cain Arena; Attendance: 9,043
12 October 2023; 7:30pm AEDT (UTC+11)	Stats	Scoring by quarter: 12–10, 29–20, 40–34, 50–40			John Cain Arena; Attendance: 9,043
12 October 2023; 7:30pm AEDT (UTC+11)	Stats	Cara Koenen 27/31 (87%); Kiera Austin 22/27 (81%); Sophie Garbin 1/1 (100%)		Amelia Walmsley 21/25 (84%); Ameliaranne Ekenasio 17/20 (85%); Maia Wilson 2/2 (100%)	John Cain Arena; Attendance: 9,043

=== Second test ===
15 October 2023; 6:30pm AEST (UTC+10)	Stats	Australia	55–46	New Zealand	Brisbane Entertainment Centre; Attendance: 9,177
15 October 2023; 6:30pm AEST (UTC+10)	Stats	Scoring by quarter: 16–11, 28–23, 41–32, 55–46			Brisbane Entertainment Centre; Attendance: 9,177
15 October 2023; 6:30pm AEST (UTC+10)	Stats	Cara Koenen 33/33 (100%); Kiera Austin 21/26 (81%); Sophie Dwyer 1/1 (100%)		Grace Nweke 21/24 (88%); Amelia Walmsley 17/19 (89%); Ameliaranne Ekenasio 6/9 (67%); Tiana Metuarau 2/2 (100%)	Brisbane Entertainment Centre; Attendance: 9,177

Notes

- ^1 The second test was Australia's 500th international test match.

=== Third test ===
19 October 2023; 7:30pm NZDST (UTC+13:00)	Stats	New Zealand	56–53	Australia	Robyn Broughton Stadium ^{2} Attendance: 3,000
19 October 2023; 7:30pm NZDST (UTC+13:00)	Stats	Scoring by quarter: 10–14, 28–24, 38–40, 56–53			Robyn Broughton Stadium ^{2} Attendance: 3,000
19 October 2023; 7:30pm NZDST (UTC+13:00)	Stats	Grace Nweke 34/36 (94%); Ameliaranne Ekenasio 12/14 (86%); Amelia Walmsley 8/10 (80%); Tiana Metuarau 2/4 (50%)		Sophie Garbin 21/22 (95%); Kiera Austin 16/23 (70%); Cara Koenen 16/18 (89%)	Robyn Broughton Stadium ^{2} Attendance: 3,000

Notes

- ^2 ILT Stadium Southland was renamed Robyn Broughton Stadium for this match in honour of the former coach, Robyn Broughton who had died on 6 September 2023.

=== Fourth test ===
23 October 2023; 4:00pm NZDST (UTC+13:00)	Stats	New Zealand	53–50	Australia	Spark Arena; Attendance: 5,000
23 October 2023; 4:00pm NZDST (UTC+13:00)	Stats	Scoring by quarter: 12–15, 26–28, 38–41, 53–50			Spark Arena; Attendance: 5,000
23 October 2023; 4:00pm NZDST (UTC+13:00)	Stats	Grace Nweke 43/45 (96%); Ameliaranne Ekenasio 10/10 (100%)		Sophie Garbin 37/40 (93%); Kiera Austin 7/9 (78%); Cara Koenen 6/7 (86%)	Spark Arena; Attendance: 5,000
