= Sophie Garbin =

Australian netball player (born 1997)

Personal information
- Full name: Sophie Muriel Garbin
- Born: 6 April 1997 (age 29) Kalgoorlie, Western Australia
- Height: 1.84 m (6 ft 0 in)
- Relative: Darcee Garbin (sister)
- School: Kolbe Catholic College
- University: Curtin University

Netball career
- Playing positions: GS, GA
Years	Club team	Apps
201x–2017	Coastal Sharks	
2015–2017	Western Sting	
2017–2021	New South Wales Swifts	49
2022–2023	Collingwood Magpies	27
2024–	Melbourne Vixens	34
- (Correct as of 2nd of August, 2025)
Years	National team	Caps
2018–	Australia	32
- (Correct as of 2nd of July, 2025)
Medal record
Representing Australia
Netball World Cup
Gold medal – first place	2023 Cape Town	Team
Commonwealth Games
Bronze medal – third place	2026 Glasgow	Netball
Fast5 World Series
Bronze medal – third place	2018 Melbourne	Team
- Updated on 2nd of August, 2025

Sophie Muriel Garbin (born 6 April 1997) is an Australian netball player. She was a member of the New South Wales Swifts teams that won the 2019 and 2021 Super Netball titles, and the Melbourne Vixens team that won the 2025 Suncorp Super Netball season. This places her with Laura Scherian as the only two professional netball players with three Suncorp Super Netball titles. In 2017 she was also a member of the Western Sting team that won the Australian Netball League title. She was also a member of the Australia team that won the bronze medal at the 2018 Fast5 Netball World Series. She also sits on the board of the Australian Netball Players’ Association. Garbin's older sister, Darcee Garbin, is an Australia women's basketball international.

== Early life, family and education ==
Garbin is originally from Western Australia. Born in Kalgoorlie, she was raised in Kambalda before moving to Perth with her family when she was 13. In her youth she played both Australian rules football and basketball as well as netball. Between 2010 and 2014 Garbin attended Kolbe Catholic College, Rockingham. As of 2020 she is studying part time at Curtin University. Garbin's older sister, Darcee Garbin, is an Australia women's basketball international.

== Playing career ==
=== Coastal Sharks ===
Garbin played for Coastal Sharks in the West Australian Netball League.

=== Western Sting ===
Between 2015 and 2017 Garbin played for Western Sting in the Australian Netball League. In 2017 she was a member of the Western Sting team that won the ANL title and was named MVP in the grand final. During the 2017 season, Garbin also set a new ANL goal scoring record. By round six of the competition she had surpassed the previous ANL record of 468 goals. By the end of the season she had scored 607 goals. She was subsequently named the 2017 ANL MVP.

=== New South Wales Swifts ===
In 2017 Garbin signed for New South Wales Swifts. On 29 April 2018 she made her Super Netball for Swifts in a 2018 Round 1 match against Queensland Firebirds. Garbin scored 18 goals from 19 attempts, including a late winner which helped Swifts clinch a 54–53 win. Garbin was a member of the Swifts team that won the 2019 Suncorp Super Netball title. In the grand final she scored six goals from seven attempts as Swifts defeated Sunshine Coast Lightning 64–47. In August 2019 Garbin renewed her Swifts contract ahead of the 2020 Suncorp Super Netball season. Garbin was named the NSW Swifts Players' Player of the Year in both 2019 and 2020.

=== Collingwood Magpies Netball ===
In September 2021, it was announced that Garbin would depart New South Wales Swifts after appearing in 49 games over 4 seasons and would sign with the Collingwood Magpies. In May 2023, the Collingwood Magpies announced that they would be withdrawing their Super Netball license at the conclusion of the season. This marked Garbin's final season at the club after spending two years with the Magpies and playing 27 games, before the Magpies ultimately folded their netball team.

=== Melbourne Vixens ===
In December 2023, it was announced that Garbin would sign with the Melbourne Vixens for the 2024 season. In her first year at the club, Garbin played as the Vixen's primary goal shooter. Garbin made her club debut for the Vixens on the 14th of April 2024, in their 68-61 Round 1 victory over cross-town rivals, the Melbourne Mavericks. During the match, Garbin scored 39 goals from 43 attempts, as well as 3 Super Shots from 3 attempts. In Round 8 of the 2024 season, Garbin broke the Melbourne Vixens record for most points scored in a game, when she scored a total of 54 points in the Vixens 74-60 victory over GIANTS Netball. Garbin was a member of the Vixens team that lost the 2024 Suncorp Super Netball title in a tense battle against the Adelaide Thunderbirds, with the Vixens falling 57-59 in the decider. In the grand final, Garbin scored 22 goals from 24 attempts. At the Vixens 2024 Sharelle McMahon Medal, Garbin finished in 5th position, polling a total of 27 votes. She also set a new Vixens record for the most offensive rebounds in a season, with 54 offensive rebounds. At the 2024 Australian Netball Awards, Garbin was named in the 2024 Super Netball Team of the Year, as an interchange player for the attack end. After the conclusion of the 2024 season, re-signed with the Vixens 2025 Suncorp Super Netball season.

Garbin played her 100th national league game on 25 May 2025, in the Vixens 18 goal victory over the Queensland Firebirds at Nissan Arena. She finished the match with 42 goals from 45 attempts. Garbin was a member of the Vixens team that won the 2025 Suncorp Super Netball title, in a tense and tightly-contested 1 goal win over the West Coast Fever, 59-58. Garbin finished the match with 33 goals from 36 attempts, capping off an incredible fairy-tale run for the Vixens, who finished in the 4th position at the end of the home and away season and won three straight finals to take home the season title. At the Vixens 2025 Sharelle McMahon Medal, Garbin finished in 3rd position for the Sharelle McMahon Medal, polling 32 votes. Garbin was also named the Vixens Player of the Finals, for her standout performances throughout the series. This included her exceptional performance in the Vixens 1 point Preliminary Final win over the New South Wales Swfits, as she slotted 17 goals from 17 attempts in the final quarter (including the match-winning goal), as the Vixens mounted a 10 goal final quarter comeback to win the game. In August, it was announced that the Vixens has re-signed their entire 2025 premiership roster to one-year deals for the 2026 Suncorp Super Netball season, ensuring Garbin's return to the club in 2026.

=== Australia ===
Between 2014 and 2017 Garbin represented Australia at under-17, under-19, under-20 and under-21 levels. In October 2018 she was a member of the Australia team that won the bronze medal at the 2018 Fast5 Netball World Series. In September 2019 Garbin was included the 2019 Australian Development squad. On 3 March 2021, she made her senior debut for Australia against New Zealand during the 2021 Constellation Cup.

After an impressive domestic and international campaign in 2024, Garbin won her first Liz Ellis Diamond award at the 2024 Australian Netball Awards. This award is given to the most outstanding player across the Super Netball and international season.

Tournaments	Place
2018 Fast5 Netball World Series	3rd place, bronze medalist(s)
2021 Constellation Cup	2nd place, silver medalist(s)
2023 Constellation Cup	1st
2024 Netball Nations Cup	1st
2024 Australia England netball series	1st
2024 Constellation Cup	2nd
2025 Australia South Africa netball series	1st
2025 Constellation Cup	1st

== Honours ==
Australia

- Netball World Cup
  - Winners: 2023
- Constellation Cup
  - Winners: 2022, 2023, 2025

Melbourne Vixens

- Suncorp Super Netball
  - Winners: 2025

New South Wales Swifts

- Suncorp Super Netball
  - Winners: 2019, 2021

Western Sting

- Australian Netball League
  - Winners: 2017

Individual

Year	Award
2017	Australian Netball League MVP
2019	NSW Swifts Players' Player of the Year
2020	NSW Swifts Players' Player of the Year
2024	Super Netball Team of the Year
2024	Liz Ellis Diamond
2024	Melbourne Vixens Player of the Finals
