= Super Netball Grand Final Most Valuable Player =

Australian sports award

The Super Netball Grand Final Most Valuable Player (MVP) is an annual Super Netball award in Australia. It is awarded to the best player of the SSN Grand Final.

Karla Mostert (now Karla Pretorius) won the inaugural award in 2017.

== Winners ==
Season	Player	Nationality	Team	Ref.
2017	Karla Mostert	South Africa	Sunshine Coast Lightning	
2018	Caitlin Bassett	Australia	Sunshine Coast Lightning	
2019	Samantha Wallace	Trinidad and Tobago	New South Wales Swifts	
2020	Mwai Kumwenda	Malawi	Melbourne Vixens	
2021	Maddy Turner	Australia	New South Wales Swifts	
2022	Sasha Glasgow	Australia	West Coast Fever	
2023	Eleanor Cardwell	England	Adelaide Thunderbirds	
2024	Romelda Aiken-George	Jamaica	Adelaide Thunderbirds	
2025	Kiera Austin	Australia	Melbourne Vixens	
2026	Latanya Wilson	Jamaica	Adelaide Thunderbirds	
