= Maddy Gordon =

New Zealand netball international

Personal information
- Full name: Madeline Gordon
- Born: 16 January 2000 (age 26) Whangārei, New Zealand
- Height: 1.74 m (5 ft 9 in)
- School: Mount Albert Grammar School

Netball career
- Playing positions: C, WA, WD
Years	Club team	Apps
2018	Central Zone	
2018–2025	Central Pulse	
2026–present	Queensland Firebirds	
Years	National team	Caps
2021–present	New Zealand	50
Medal record
Women's netball
Representing New Zealand
Commonwealth Games
Gold medal – first place	2026 Glasgow	Team

Madeline Gordon (born 16 January 2000) is a New Zealand netball international, who plays for Queensland Firebirds in the Super Netball. She was a member of the New Zealand teams that won the 2026 Commonwealth Games, 2021 Constellation Cup and the 2022 Taini Jamison Trophy Series. Gordon was also a prominent member of the Central Pulse teams that won the 2019, 2020 and 2022 ANZ Premiership titles.

== Early life, family and education ==
Gordon was born and bred in Whangārei. She is the daughter of Carolyn and David Gordon. She stayed in Whangārei until she was 16. She subsequently attended Mount Albert Grammar School, where she excelled at netball, volleyball, athletics, cross-country and swimming.

== Club career ==
=== Central Zone ===
In 2018, Gordon was a member of the Central Zone team that won the National Netball League title. She was player of the match as Central defeated Waikato Bay of Plenty 62–53 in the grand final.

=== Central Pulse ===
Gordon was a member of the Central Pulse team that won the 2018 Netball New Zealand Super Club tournament. She was subsequently a prominent member of the Pulse teams that won the 2019, 2020 and 2022 ANZ Premiership titles. She was Grand Final MVP as she helped Pulse win the 2020 title. After an outstanding 2023 season for Pulse, Gordon was included in Brendon Egan's Stuff's team of the season and was recalled to the New Zealand team for the 2023 Netball World Cup.

=== Queensland Firebirds ===
Gordon signed with the Queensland Firebirds for the 2026 Suncorp Super Netball season.

== International career ==
In August 2020, Gordon was included in the 2020–21 New Zealand squad. She was the sole debutant featured in the squad. On 3 March 2021, Gordon made her senior debut for New Zealand against Australia during the 2021 Constellation Cup. Gordon was named in the squad for the 2026 Commonwealth Games, where the Silver Ferns won their first Commonwealth Games gold medal in 16 years, defeating Jamaica in the final.

Tournaments	Place
2021 Constellation Cup	1st
2021 Taini Jamison Trophy Series	2nd
2022 Taini Jamison Trophy Series	1st
2022 Constellation Cup	2nd
2023 Netball World Cup	4th
2023 Taini Jamison Trophy Series	1st
2023 Constellation Cup	2nd
2024 Netball Nations Cup	3rd
2024 Taini Jamison Trophy Series	2nd
2024 Constellation Cup	1st
2025 Taini Jamison Trophy Series	1st
2025 Constellation Cup	2nd
2025 New Zealand netball tour of Great Britain	
2026 Commonwealth Games	1st

== Statistics ==
=== ANZ Premiership ===
Season	Team	G/A	GA	RB	CPR	FD	IC	DF	PN	TO	MP
2019	Pulse	0/0	26	0	10	39	4	2	14	10	11
2020	Pulse	0/0	173	0	156	291	6	19	64	37	13
2021	Pulse	0/0	66	0	55	138	11	35	100	38	15
2022	Pulse	0/0	17	0	42	41	8	30	58	15	11
2023	Pulse	0/0	?	0	0	438	15	47	76	31	16
Career											

== Honours ==
=== New Zealand ===
- Commonwealth Games: 2026
- Constellation Cup: 2021, 2024
- Taini Jamison Trophy: 2022, 2023

=== Central Pulse ===
- ANZ Premiership
  - Winners: 2019, 2020, 2022
  - Minor premiers: 2019, 2020, 2022
- Netball New Zealand Super Club: 2018

=== Central Zone ===
- National Netball League: 2018

== Individual awards ==
Year	Award
2020	Grand Final MVP
