= Madeline McAuliffe =

Australian netball player (born 1994)

Personal information
- Born: 5 December 1994 (age 31) Townsville, Queensland, Australia
- Height: 1.80 m (5 ft 11 in)
- School: John Paul College (Brisbane)

Netball career
- Playing positions: WD, C
Years	Club team	Apps
2017–21	Sunshine Coast Lightning	75

Madeline McAuliffe (born 5 December 1994) is an Australian former netballer, last playing for the Sunshine Coast Lightning in the Suncorp Super Netball league.

McAuliffe was a foundation player at the Lightning ahead of the club's inaugural season in 2017 and was re-signed by the club for the 2019 season. Prior to joining the Lightning, McAullife played for the Queensland Fusion in the second-tier Australian Netball League and trialled with the Adelaide Thunderbirds. She has also represented Australia at under 19 and 21 level.

At the completion of the 2021 Suncorp Super Netball season, McAuliffe stepped away from professional sport to focus on her career outside of netball. McAuliffe appeared in 75 games for the Lightning across five seasons, including the 2017 and 2018 premierships.
