= Jacqui Russell =

Australian netball player

Personal information
- Born: 1 August 1988 (age 38) Brisbane, Queensland, Australia
- Height: 1.76 m (5 ft 9 in)

Netball career
- Playing positions: WD, C
Years	Club team	Apps
2010–11	Queensland Firebirds	
2018–	Sunshine Coast Lightning	

Jacqui Russell (born 1 August 1988) is an Australian netball player in the Suncorp Super Netball league, playing for the Sunshine Coast Lightning.

Russell began her netball career at the Queensland Firebirds in the ANZ Championship, where she played for the club in 2010 and 2011 and was part of the club's premiership winning team in the latter year. She returned to top-level netball in 2018, replacing Sarahpheinna Woulf as a permanent injury replacement player at the Sunshine Coast Lightning at the start of the season. In between that time Russell was a captain of the Queensland Fusion team in the second-tier Australian Netball League. She was part of the Lightning's premiership success in the 2018 season and afterwards was re-signed by the club for the following season.
