= UniSC Arena =

Multi-purpose indoor sports in Queensland, Australia

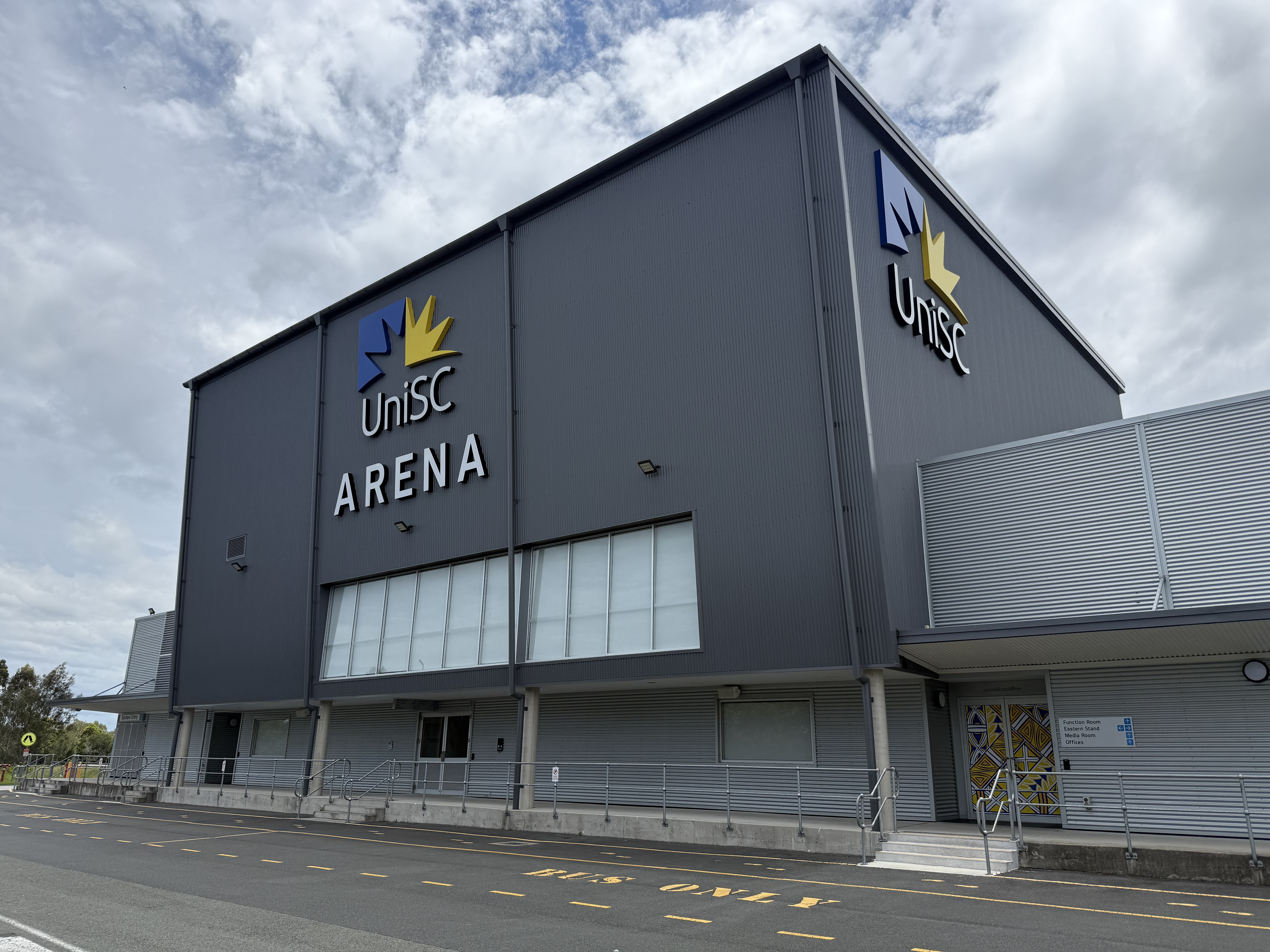
- UniSC Arena, January 2026
- Interactive map of UniSC Arena
- Location: Sunshine Motorway, Sippy Downs, Queensland, 4556
- Coordinates: 26.7169°S 153.0682°E
- Owner: University of the Sunshine Coast
- Capacity: 3,000

Construction
- Opened: 1996
- Cost: A$9 million (2019 expansion)

Tenants
- Sunshine Coast Lightning (NNL) (2017–present); USC Rip City (NBL1)

UniSC Arena (previously known as USC Stadium) is a multi-purpose indoor sports facility located on the Sippy Downs campus of the University of the Sunshine Coast in Queensland. The stadium hosts netball, basketball, volleyball and futsal events for professional athletes and students. The stadium is primarily utilised by the Sunshine Coast Lightning in the Suncorp Super Netball league, who play home matches on the main court and are based at the campus.

== History ==
The stadium was originally opened along with the broader University campus in 1996. The court was fixed with seating for up to 320 people. The seating capacity was increased to 2,000 ahead of the entry of the Sunshine Coast Lightning in the new national netball league in 2017 with two new retractable grandstands at the northern and southern sides. The Lightning's success at the stadium led to further expansion in 2019, with seating added at the eastern end taking the capacity to 3,000. Two of the three bays of seating at the stadium are retractable, allowing for further floor space to be utilised where necessary. The most recent upgrades to the facility resulted in new change rooms, a function room, public bathrooms and an improved sound system.

UniSC Arena was a host venue of the 2024 NBL1 National Finals.
