= Kristiana Manu'a =

Australian netball player (born 1995)

Personal information
- Born: 3 September 1995 (age 31) Wellington, New Zealand
- Height: 1.82 m (6 ft 0 in)
- School: Westfields Sports High School

Netball career
- Playing positions: GD, GK
Years	Club team	Apps
2015–16	Waikato Bay of Plenty Magic	29
2017–21	Giants Netball	48
2022-2023	Central Pulse	32
2024	Melbourne Mavericks	9
2025	Sunshine Coast Lightning	10
Years	National team	Caps
2016	Australia	2
2023, 2025	Samoa	7

Kristiana Manu'a (born 3 September 1995) is a New Zealand-born Australian netball player in the Suncorp Super Netball, playing currently for the Sunshine Coast Lightning.

Manu'a was born in Wellington, the capital city of New Zealand, though moved with family to Liverpool, New South Wales as a baby. She began her netball career back in New Zealand in 2015, playing for the Waikato Bay of Plenty Magic under head coach Julie Fitzgerald. Despite representing Australia at underage level, Manu'a was approached by Netball New Zealand officials to represent the New Zealand national team during her time at the Magic. She remained an Australian player however and made her debut for the Australian Diamonds in the 2016 Quad Series.

Manu'a was set to play for Giants Netball in the inaugural season of Super Netball in 2017, though missed the entire season due to a ruptured Achilles tendon sustained in the off-season. She eventually made her debut for the Giants in the 2018 season before finishing with the club in 2021.

In 2022 Manu'a returned back to New Zealand, joining the Central Pulse in the ANZ Premiership. Her strong form saw her named in the 2022-2023 Silver Ferns development squad. Manu'a took the court in the 2022 Cadbury Series, playing for the NZ A team across the series which included a Mixed Side for the first time alongside the NZ Men's team. She also was a member of the 2022 Fast 5 Ferns team that won a Bronze medal.

In 2024, Manu’a joined the Melbourne Mavericks in their inaugural season during round 4 as a permanent replacement player for the injured Lauren Moore and remained as a training partner in early 2025.

In March 2025, she signed with Sunshine Coast Lightning on a permanent replacement player contract for the 2025 Suncorp Super Netball Season. She replaced Ava Black, who suffered a ruptured ACL during pre-season training in January.
