= Mahalia Cassidy =

Australian netball player

Personal information
- Born: 9 October 1995 (age 31) Redcliffe, Queensland
- Height: 1.73 m (5 ft 8 in)
- School: St John Fisher College, Bracken Ridge

Netball career
- Playing positions: C, WA
Years	Club team	Apps
2015–2020	Queensland Firebirds	
2021-	Sunshine Coast Lightning	

Mahalia Cassidy (born 9 October 1995) is an Australian netball player in the Suncorp Super Netball league, playing for the Sunshine Coast Lightning.

Cassidy made her debut at the elite level in the ANZ Championship, playing for the Firebirds as a temporary replacement player for several games in the 2015 season. She joined the Firebirds permanently the following year and played six matches, culminating in a premiership title in 2016. However, she suffered a serious knee injury that kept her out of the entire 2017 season. She returned to the team the following year and featured in the Firebirds' mid-court. In November 2020, Cassidy signed with the Sunshine Coast Lightning for the 2021 season.

On 10 July 2021, Cassidy played her 50th national league game.
