= Kiera Austin =

Australian netball player

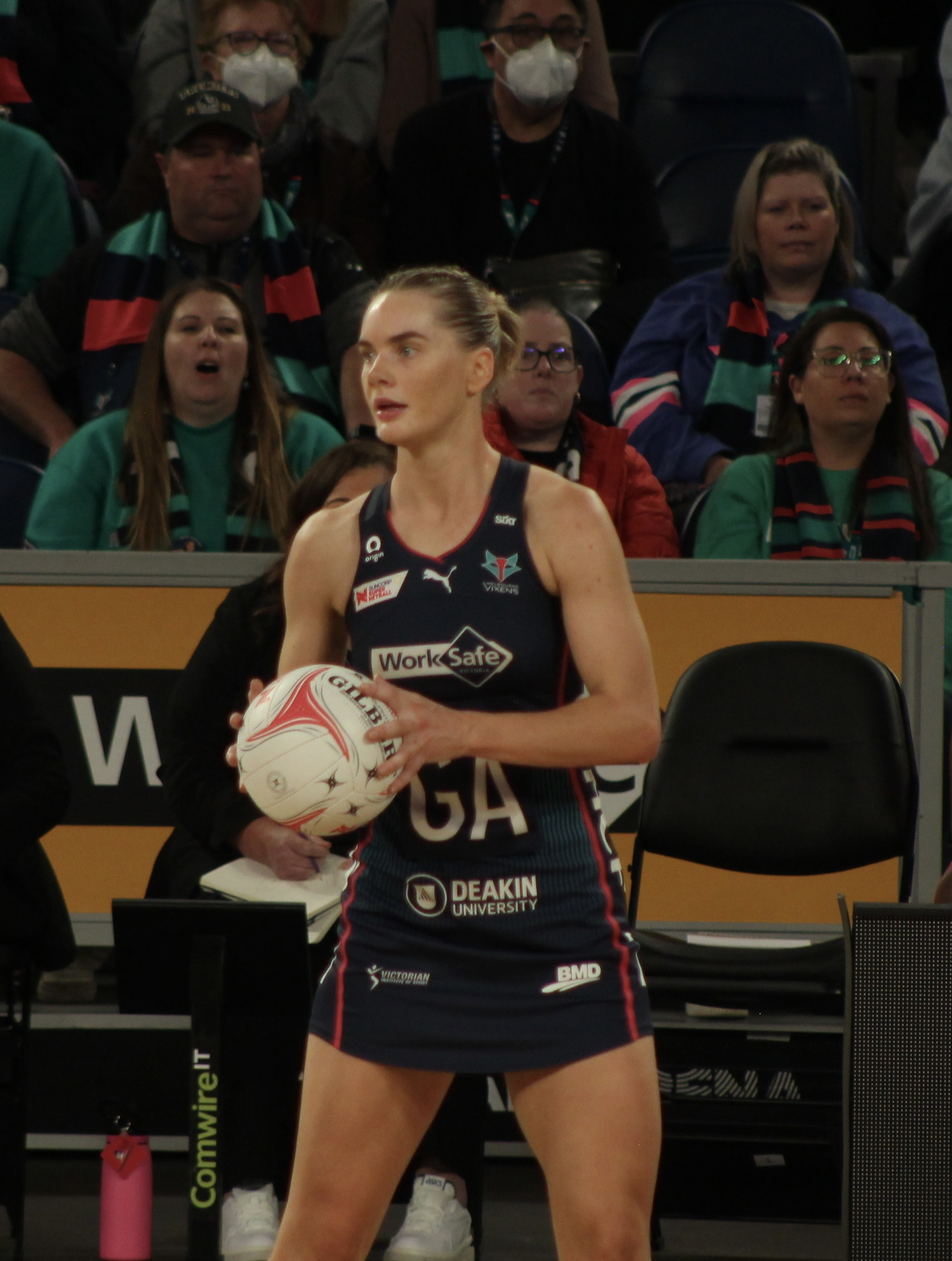
- Kiera Austin with the Melbourne Vixens in 2024

Personal information
- Born: 26 August 1997 (age 29) Sydney, New South Wales, Australia
- Height: 1.85 m (6 ft 1 in)
- School: Mercy Catholic College Chatswood
- University: Macquarie University

Netball career
- Playing positions: GA, GS, WA
2018–2021	Giants Netball	29
2022-	Melbourne Vixens	65
Years	National team	Caps
2021–present	Australian Diamonds	35
- (Correct as of August 31, 2025)
Medal record
Netball
Representing Australia
Netball World Cup
Gold medal – first place	2023 Cape Town	Team
Commonwealth Games
Gold medal – first place	2022 Birmingham	Netball

Kiera Austin (born 26 August 1997) is an Australian netball player in the Suncorp Super Netball league, having previously played for Giants Netball. She injured her ACL during round 1 of the 2021 season and missed the rest of the 2021 season. After youngster Sophie Dwyer came in she looked elsewhere to play. The Vixens were quick to snatch her up after not offering Kaylia Stanton another contract.

Austin debuted in the Super Netball league for the Giants in 2018, having been a training partner for Canberra Giants in the Australian Netball League the previous year. She was a frequent member of the underage state and national teams before debuting for the Giants, most notably earning a silver medal for Australia at the 2017 Netball World Youth Cup. Austin was selected for the Australian Fast5 team at the 2018 tournament in Melbourne and was later selected in the Australian Diamonds squad as a replacement for the injured Caitlin Bassett in January 2019.

== Early life ==
Austin grew up in the Sydney suburb of North Ryde. She was educated at Holy Spirit Primary School in North Ryde, before attending secondary school at Mercy Catholic College in Chatswood. She first played junior netball for local club North Ryde Spirit in the Eastwood Ryde Netball Association.

She has Scottish heritage from her father who is originally from Scotland.
