= Sunshine Coast Lightning =

Australian netball team

- Founded: 2016
- Based in: University of the Sunshine Coast
- Regions: Sunshine Coast, Queensland
- Home venue: USC Stadium
- Head coach: Belinda Reynolds
- Asst coach: Madison Browne
- Captain: Liz Watson
- Premierships: 2 (2017, 2018)
- League: Super Netball
- 2026 placing: 6th
- Website: sunshinecoastlightning.com.au
Playing dress	Alternate

Sunshine Coast Lightning are a professional Australian netball team based at the University of the Sunshine Coast. The team was formed in 2016 as a joint venture between the university and Melbourne Storm. Since 2017 they have played in Super Netball. Lightning have played in three grand finals, winning the premierships in 2017 and 2018.

== History ==
=== New franchise ===
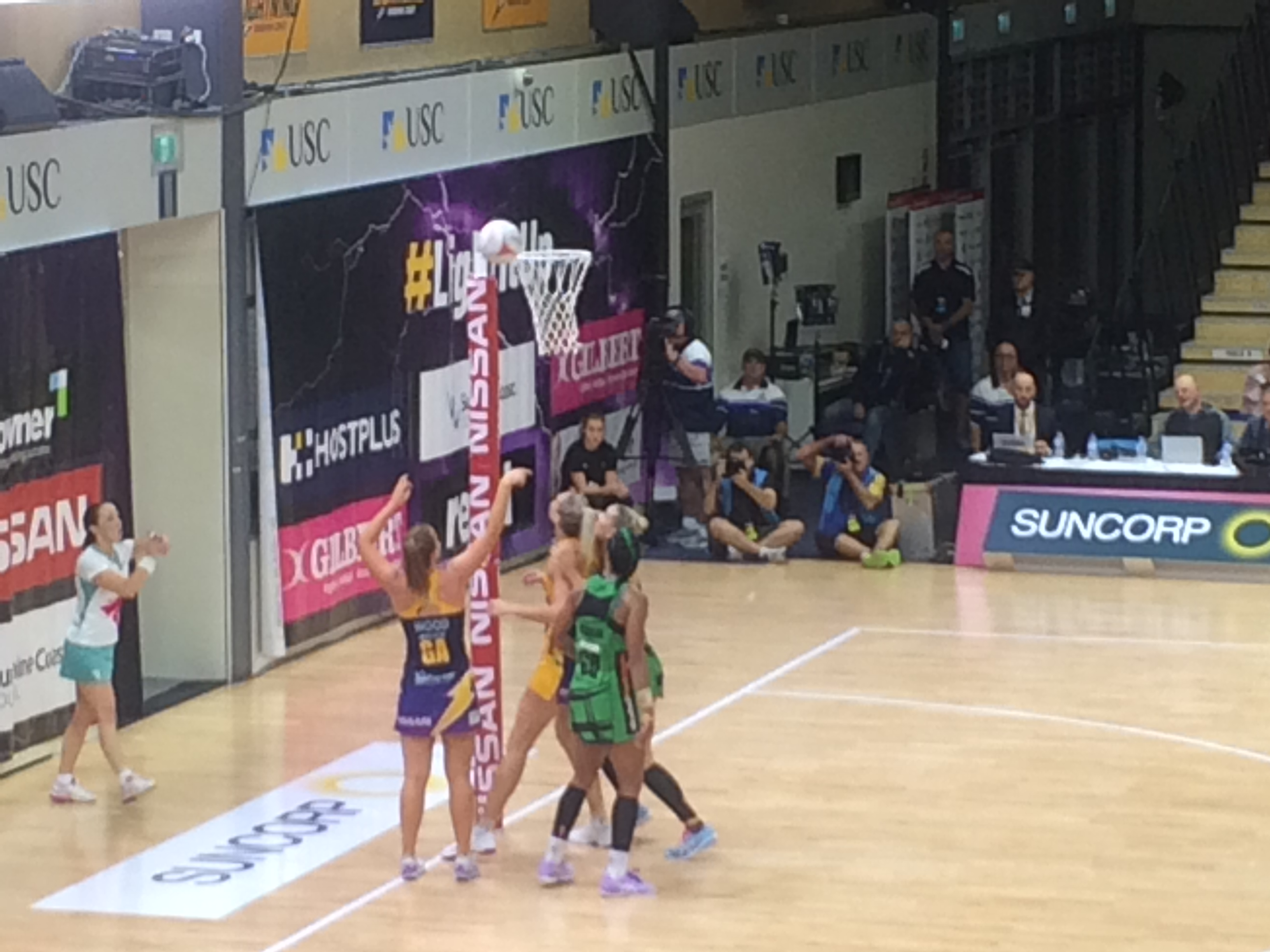
12 May 2017; Sunshine Coast Lightning v West Coast Fever in a 2017 Suncorp Super Netball Round 12 match at USC Stadium

In May 2016, Netball Australia and Netball New Zealand announced that the ANZ Championship would be discontinued after the 2016 season. In Australia it was replaced by Super Netball. The founding members of Super Netball included the five former Australian ANZ Championship teams – Adelaide Thunderbirds, Melbourne Vixens, New South Wales Swifts, Queensland Firebirds and West Coast Fever; plus three brand new franchises: Collingwood Magpies, Giants Netball and the Lightning.

In August 2016, Sunshine Coast Lightning was officially launched. The team was formed as a joint venture by Melbourne Storm and the University of the Sunshine Coast with the support of Sunshine Coast Council. The colours of the team - navy blue, purple and yellow - are the same as the Storm's. The logo features a bolt of lightning.

=== Noeline Taurua era ===
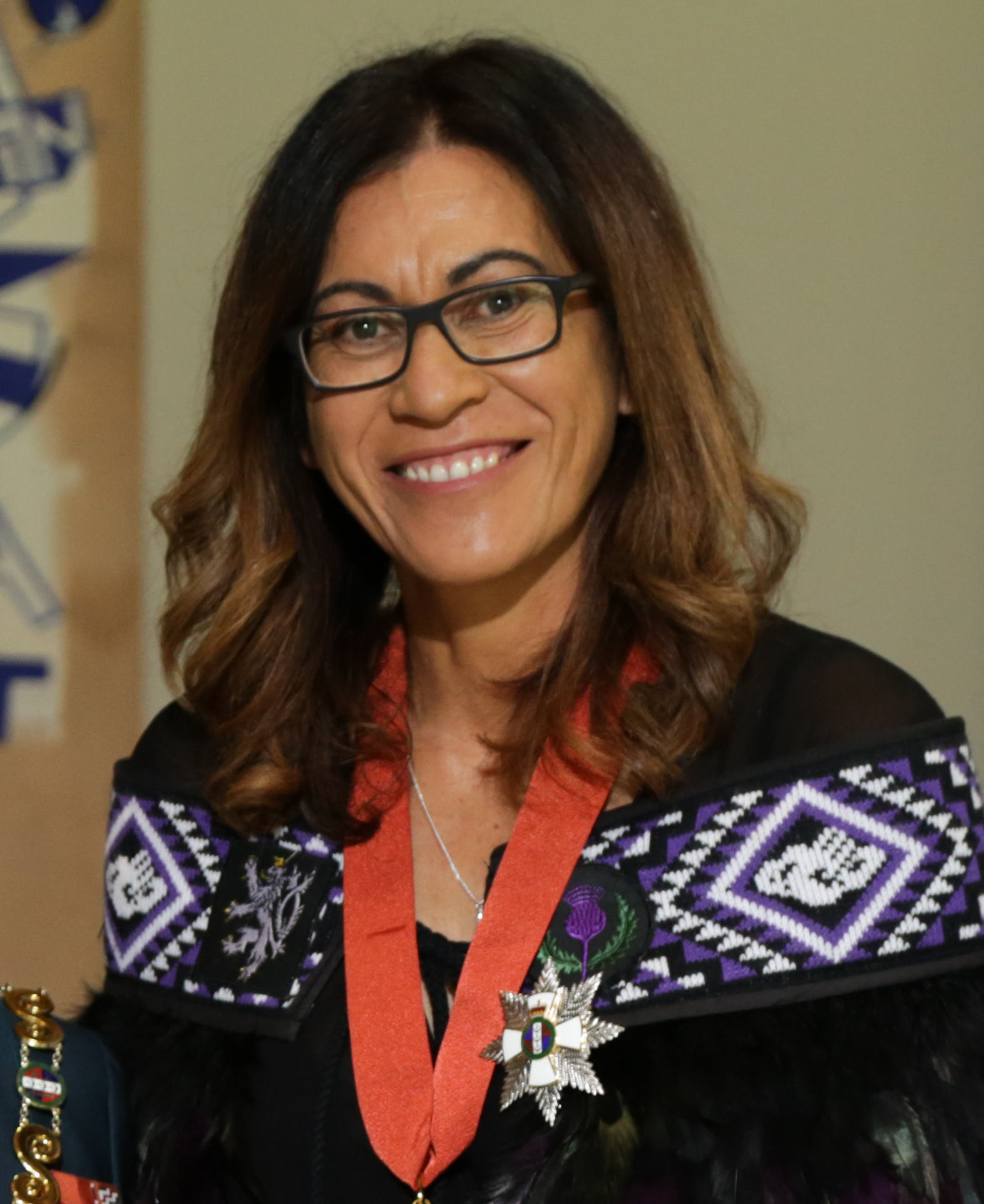
Noeline Taurua guided Sunshine Coast Lightning to the 2017 and 2018 Super Netball titles

Before the official launch of Sunshine Coast Lightning, Noeline Taurua had already been announced as the inaugural head coach of the new franchise. In September 2016, Caitlin Bassett and Stephanie Wood became the first two Lightning players. Geva Mentor also subsequently signed for Lightning. In February 2017, Mentor was named captain of the new franchise. In 2017, Lightning finished the season as inaugural champions after defeating Giants Netball 65–48 in the grand final. In 2018 they retained the title after defeating West Coast Fever 62–59 in the grand final. In 2019, Lightning finished the regular season as minor premiers. They also played in their third successive grand final but this time, they were defeated by New South Wales Swifts. After three seasons as head coach at Lightning, Taurua resigned and was replaced by her assistant at the club, Kylee Byrne.

Regular season statistics
Season	Position	Won	Drawn	Lost
2017	2nd	11	1	2
2018	4th	8	1	5
2019	1st	12	0	2
2020	2nd	9	0	5
2021	4th	8	0	6
2022	8th	4	0	10
2023	5th	6	0	8
2024	4th	6	0	8
2025	5th	7	0	7
2026	6th	5	0	9

Premierships
Runners Up

== Grand finals ==
Season	Winners	Score	Runners up	Venue
2017	Sunshine Coast Lightning	65–48	Giants Netball	Brisbane Entertainment Centre
2018	Sunshine Coast Lightning	62–59	West Coast Fever	Perth Arena
2019	New South Wales Swifts	64–47	Sunshine Coast Lightning	Brisbane Entertainment Centre

== Home venues ==
Lightning now play all of their home matches at UniSC Arena in Sippy Downs. The venue is also the club's administrative and training base.

They have also previously played occasional home matches at the Brisbane Entertainment Centre.

== Notable players ==
=== 2027 squad ===
2027 Sunshine Coast Lightning roster
Players
Coaching staff

Nat.	Name	Position(s)	DoB	Height
(Australia)	Jess Anstiss	WD, C	20 November 1996 (age 29)	1.75 m (5 ft 9 in)
(Australia)	Ava Black	C, WD	12 June 2003 (age 23)	1.84 m (6 ft 0 in)
(Australia)	Courtney Bruce	GK, GD	8 December 1993 (age 32)	1.89 m (6 ft 2 in)
(New Zealand)	Karin Burger	GD, WD	12 April 1993 (age 33)	1.84 m (6 ft 0 in)
(Australia)	Maggie Caris	GK, GD	21 December 2002 (age 23)	1.90 m (6 ft 3 in)
(New Zealand)	Georgia Heffernan	GS, GA	7 October 1999 (age 27)	1.81 m (5 ft 11 in)
(Australia)	Leesa Mi Mi	WA, C	18 May 2001 (age 25)	1.70 m (5 ft 7 in)
(Australia)	Donnell Wallam	GS	23 January 1994 (age 32)	1.90 m (6 ft 3 in)
(Australia)	Liz Watson	WA, C	30 March 1994 (age 32)	1.78 m (5 ft 10 in)
(Australia)	Olivia Wilkinson	GA, GS	5 February 2004 (age 22)	1.90 m (6 ft 3 in)

Head coach

- (Australia) Belinda Reynolds

Assistant coaches

- (Australia) Madison Browne

Notes

- (c) – Captain
- (cc) – Co-captain
- (vc) – Vice-captain
- – Injury / maternity leave
- (TRP) – Temporary Replacement Player
Player profiles: Team website
Last updated: 23 October 2026

=== Internationals ===
Australia

- Caitlin Bassett
- Kelsey Browne
- Courtney Bruce
- Tara Hinchliffe
- Cara Koenen
- Kristiana Manu'a
- Laura Scherian
- Donnell Wallam
- Liz Watson
- Stephanie Wood

England

- Geva Mentor
- Kate Shimmin

Jamaica

- Kadie-Ann Dehaney

New Zealand

- Karin Burger
- Georgia Heffernan
- Laura Langman
- Erena Mikaere

South Africa

- Phumza Maweni
- Karla Pretorius

Uganda

- Peace Proscovia

=== Captains ===
Name	Years
Geva Mentor	2017–2018
Laura Langman	2019–2020
Karla Pretorius	2021
Stephanie Wood	2022–2025
Liz Watson	2026-present

== Club Award winners ==
Steph Fretwell Medal

The club's Player of the Year was renamed to the Steph Fretwell Medal in 2026.

Season	Winner
2017	Geva Mentor
2018	Stephanie Wood; Karla Pretorius
2019	Karla Pretorius (2)
2020	Karla Pretorius (3)
2021	Stephanie Wood (2)
2022	Mahalia Cassidy
2023	Stephanie Wood (3)
2024	Liz Watson
2025	Stephanie Fretwell (4); Cara Koenen
2026	Liz Watson (2)

Players' Player

Season	Player
2017	Geva Mentor
2018	Karla Pretorius
2019	Karla Pretorius
2020	Karla Pretorius
2021	Cara Koenen
2022	Mahalia Cassidy
2023	Stephanie Wood
2024	Stephanie Fretwell
2025	Tara Hinchliffe
2026	Donnell Wallam

Members' Player

Season	Player
2017	Laura Langman
2018	Stephanie Wood
2019	Karla Pretorius
2020	Cara Koenen
2021	Cara Koenen
2022	Laura Scherian
2023	Stephanie Wood
2024	Ashleigh Ervin
2025	Mahalia Cassidy
2026	not awarded

Team Spirit Award

Season	Player
2017	Laura Scherian
2018	Jacqui Russell
2019	Jacqui Russell
2020	Madeline McAuliffe
2021	Kate Shimmin
2022	Tara Hinchliffe
2023	Karla Pretorius
2024	Leesa Mi Mi
2025	Tara Hinchliffe
2026	not awarded

== Competition Award winners ==
Super Netball Player of the Year

Season	Player
2017	Geva Mentor

Super Netball Grand Final MVP

Season	Player
2017	Karla Pretorius
2018	Caitlin Bassett

Super Netball Team of the Year

Season	Player	Position
2017	Laura Langman	C
2017	Geva Mentor	GK
2018	Karla Pretorius	GD
2018	Geva Mentor	GK
2019	Karla Pretorius	GD
2020	Karla Pretorius	GD
2020	Cara Koenen	Reserve
2023	Stephanie Fretwell	Reserve
2024	Liz Watson	Reserve
2024	Ashleigh Ervin	Reserve
2025	Liz Watson	Reserve

== Head coaches ==
Coach	Years
Noeline Taurua	2016–2019
Kylee Byrne	2019–2022
Belinda Reynolds	2023–present

== Sunshine Coast Lightning Bolts ==
The reserve team of the Sunshine Coast Lightning is known as the Sunshine Coast Lightning Bolts. This team currently plays in the Super Netball Reserves competition, which began in 2024, after rebranding from the Australian Netball Championships and prior to that, the Australian Netball League. The Lightning Bolts played in their first grand final in the 2026 season, losing 69-55 to the QBE Swifts Academy.

Lightning's previous reserve team was the Territory Storm, as a result of a partnership between the club and Netball NT lasting from 2017 to 2019. The club had also formed a partnership with Netball ACT in 2020 for the Capital Darters to serve as the reserve team, however the ANL season was cancelled due to the COVID-19 pandemic.

The club also founded the USC Thunder playing in Netball Queensland's HART Premier Netball League Sapphire Division.

== Premierships ==
- Super Netball
  - Winners: 2017, 2018
  - Runners Up: 2019
  - Minor Premierships: 2019
- Super Netball Reserves / Australian Netball Championships / Australian Netball League
  - Runners Up: 2026
