= Cara Koenen =

Australian netball player (born 1996)

Personal information
- Born: 27 February 1996 (age 30) Magnetic Island, Queensland, Australia
- Height: 1.90 m (6 ft 3 in)
- Relatives: sister: Breanna (AFLW Brisbane Lions Captain), brother: Dirk (AFL Gold Coast Academy)
- School: Cathedral School, Townsville

Netball career
- Playing positions: GS, GA
Years	Club team	Apps
2017–	Sunshine Coast Lightning	
Years	National team	Caps
2021-	Australian Diamonds	
Medal record
Representing Australia
Netball World Cup
Gold medal – first place	2023 Cape Town	Team
Commonwealth Games
Gold medal – first place	2022 Birmingham	Team
World University Netball Championship
Bronze medal – third place	2016 Miami	Team

Cara Koenen (born 27 February 1996) is an Australian netball player in the Suncorp Super Netball league, playing for the Sunshine Coast Lightning, which she also serves as the club's Australian Netball Players' Association delegate.

Koenen was a foundation player at the Lightning ahead of the club's inaugural season in 2017. She has remained at the club since that time and was most recently re-signed for the 2020 season. She is the only netballer in the league to have originated from Magnetic Island, which is off the coast of Townsville in northern Queensland.

On 10 July 2021, Koenen played her 50th national league game, all for the Lightning.

Koenen came off the bench to play goal shooter in the gold medal match at the 2022 Commonwealth Games, scoring 15 goals from 15 shots to help Australia win against Jamaica 55–51.

Koenen is currently playing in the commonwealth games 2026 representing Australia.
