= Super Netball Team of the Year =

Australian netball award

The Super Netball Team of the Year or SSN Team of the Year is an All-Star team consisting of the best players from the Super Netball competition in Australia.

The inaugural team was selected in 2017, at the conclusion of the season.

As of 2024, the award is known as SSN Team of the Year.

== Teams ==
Season	Position	Player	Nationality	Team
2017	GS	Mwai Kumwenda	Malawi	Melbourne Vixens
2017	GA	Tegan Philip	Australia	Melbourne Vixens
2017	WA	Liz Watson	Australia	Melbourne Vixens
2017	C	Laura Langman	New Zealand	Sunshine Coast Lightning
2017	WD	Gabi Simpson	Australia	Queensland Firebirds
2017	GD	Jo Weston	Australia	Melbourne Vixens
2017	GK	Geva Mentor	England	Sunshine Coast Lightning
2017	Reserves	Caitlin Thwaites; Serena Guthrie; Rebecca Bulley	Australia; England; Australia	Collingwood Magpies; GIANTS Netball; GIANTS Netball
2018	GS	Jhaniele Fowler	Jamaica	West Coast Fever
2018	GA	Gretel Tippett	Australia	Queensland Firebirds
2018	WA	Liz Watson (2)	Australia	Melbourne Vixens
2018	C	Serena Guthrie (2)	England	GIANTS Netball
2018	WD	Jess Anstiss	Australia	West Coast Fever
2018	GD	Karla Pretorius	South Africa	Sunshine Coast Lightning
2018	GK	Geva Mentor (2)	England	Sunshine Coast Lightning
2018	Reserves	Jo Harten; Kimberlee Green; Laura Geitz	England; Australia; Australia	GIANTS Netball; GIANTS Netball; Queensland Firebirds
2019	GS	Jhaniele Fowler (2)	Jamaica	West Coast Fever
2019	GA	Gretel Tippett (2)	Australia	Queensland Firebirds
2019	WA	Liz Watson (3)	Australia	Melbourne Vixens
2019	C	Kate Moloney	Australia	Melbourne Vixens
2019	WD	Renae Ingles	Australia	Melbourne Vixens
2019	GD	Karla Pretorius (2)	South Africa	Sunshine Coast Lightning
2019	GK	Emily Mannix	Australia	Melbourne Vixens
2019	Reserves	Samantha Wallace; Ashleigh Brazill; Shamera Sterling	Trinidad and Tobago; Australia; Jamaica	New South Wales Swifts; Collingwood Magpies; Adelaide Thunderbirds
2020	GS	Jhaniele Fowler (3)	Jamaica	West Coast Fever
2020	GA	Kiera Austin	Australia	GIANTS Netball
2020	WA	Liz Watson (4)	Australia	Melbourne Vixens
2020	C	Kate Moloney (2)	Australia	Melbourne Vixens
2020	WD	Gabi Simpson (2)	Australia	Queensland Firebirds
2020	GD	Karla Pretorius (3)	South Africa	Sunshine Coast Lightning
2020	GK	Geva Mentor (3)	England	Collingwood Magpies
2020	Reserves	Cara Koenen; Paige Hadley; Shamera Sterling (2)	Australia; Australia; Jamaica	Sunshine Coast Lightning; New South Wales Swifts; Adelaide Thunderbirds
2021	GS	Jhaniele Fowler (4)	Jamaica	West Coast Fever
2021	GA	Jo Harten (2)	England	GIANTS Netball
2021	WA	Maddie Hay	Australia	GIANTS Netball
2021	C	Kim Ravaillion	Australia	Queensland Firebirds
2021	WD	Gabi Simpson (3)	Australia	Queensland Firebirds
2021	GD	Sunday Aryang	Australia	West Coast Fever
2021	GK	Courtney Bruce	Australia	West Coast Fever
2021	Reserves	Samantha Wallace (2); Jamie-Lee Price; Shamera Sterling (3)	Trinidad and Tobago; Australia; Jamaica	New South Wales Swifts; GIANTS Netball; Adelaide Thunderbirds
2022	GS	Jhaniele Fowler (5)	Jamaica	West Coast Fever
2022	GA	Gretel Bueta (3)	Australia	Queensland Firebirds
2022	WA	Liz Watson (5)	Australia	Melbourne Vixens
2022	C	Maddy Proud	Australia	New South Wales Swifts
2022	WD	Amy Parmenter	Australia	GIANTS Netball
2022	GD	Latanya Wilson	Jamaica	Adelaide Thunderbirds
2022	GK	Shamera Sterling (4)	Jamaica	Adelaide Thunderbirds
2022	Reserves	Jo Harten (3); Kelsey Browne; Courtney Bruce (2)	England; Australia; Australia	GIANTS Netball; Collingwood Magpies; West Coast Fever
2023	GS	Donnell Wallam	Australia	Queensland Firebirds
2023	GA	Helen Housby	England	New South Wales Swifts
2023	WA	Paige Hadley (2)	Australia	New South Wales Swifts
2023	C	Jamie-Lee Price (2)	Australia	GIANTS Netball
2023	WD	Latanya Wilson (2)	Jamaica	Adelaide Thunderbirds
2023	GD	Jodi-Ann Ward	Jamaica	Collingwood Magpies
2023	GK	Shamera Sterling (5)	Jamaica	Adelaide Thunderbirds
2023	Reserves	Steph Fretwell; Liz Watson (6); Courtney Bruce (3)	England; Australia; Australia	Sunshine Coast Lightning; Melbourne Vixens; West Coast Fever
2024	GS	Jhaniele Fowler-Nembhard (6)	Jamaica	West Coast Fever
2024	GA	Kiera Austin (2)	Australia	Melbourne Vixens
2024	WA	Georgie Horjus	Australia	Adelaide Thunderbirds
2024	C	Kate Moloney (3)	Australia	Melbourne Vixens
2024	WD	Latanya Wilson (3)	Jamaica	Adelaide Thunderbirds
2024	GD	Sunday Aryang (2)	Australia	West Coast Fever
2024	GK	Shamera Sterling-Humphrey (6)	Jamaica	Adelaide Thunderbirds
2024	Reserves	Sophie Garbin; Liz Watson (7); Ashleigh Ervin	Australia; Australia; Australia	Melbourne Vixens; Sunshine Coast Lightning; Sunshine Coast Lightning
2025	GS	Jhaniele Fowler-Nembhard (7)	Jamaica	West Coast Fever
2025	GA	Kiera Austin (3)	Australia	Melbourne Vixens
2025	WA	Alice Teague-Neeld	Australia	West Coast Fever
2025	C	Paige Hadley (3)	Australia	New South Wales Swifts
2025	WD	Amy Sligar	Australia	GIANTS Netball
2025	GD	Latanya Wilson (4)	Jamaica	Adelaide Thunderbirds
2025	GK	Teigan O'Shannassy	Australia	New South Wales Swifts
2025	Reserves	Grace Nweke; Liz Watson (8); Sunday Aryang (3)	New Zealand; Australia; Australia	New South Wales Swifts; Sunshine Coast Lightning; West Coast Fever
2026	GS	Elmeré van der Berg	South Africa	Adelaide Thunderbirds
2026	GA	Sophie Dwyer	Australia	GIANTS Netball
2026	WA	Georgie Horjus (2)	Australia	Adelaide Thunderbirds
2026	C	Jamie-Lee Price (3)	Australia	Melbourne Mavericks
2026	WD	Latanya Wilson (5)	Jamaica	Adelaide Thunderbirds
2026	GD	Fran Williams	England	West Coast Fever
2026	GK	Shamera Sterling-Humphrey (7)	Jamaica	Adelaide Thunderbirds
2026	Reserves	Shimona Nelson; Kate Heffernan; Kelly Jackson	Jamaica; New Zealand; New Zealand	Melbourne Mavericks; Adelaide Thunderbirds; Queensland Firebirds
