= West Coast Fever Reserves =

Australian Netball League team

- Founded: 2008
- Based in: Perth
- Regions: Western Australia
- Home venue: Gold Netball Centre, Perth
- Head coach: Guy Keane
- Premierships: 2 (2017, 2025)
- League: Super Netball Reserves
- Website: wa.netball.com.au
Playing dress

The West Coast Fever Reserves, formerly the Western Sting, are an Australian netball team that represents Netball Western Australia in the Super Netball Reserves competition. The Fever Reserves is the reserve team of Suncorp Super Netball club, West Coast Fever. The team is made up of selected stand-out players from GIG WANL, West Coast Fever training partners and some contracted West Coast Fever players.

Under the Sting name, the team were the champions of the Australian Netball League in 2017. The Fever Reserves also won the inaugural Super Netball Reserves premiership in 2025.

== History ==
=== Australian Netball League ===
In 2008, Netball Western Australia entered a team in the Australian Netball League. They were a foundation member of the league. In 2011 the team began playing under the Western Sting name. Between 2013 and 2014 future West Coast Fever head coach, Stacey Marinkovich (née Rosman) served as the Sting head coach. In 2017, with a squad led by WANL superstar Jessica Eales, which included future Diamonds Sunday Aryang and Sophie Garbin, as well as future Fever players Emma Cosh, Olivia Lewis, Lindal Rohde, Annika Lee-Jones and Kaylia Stanton, the Sting reached their first ANL Grand Final after five bronze-medal finishes in the preceding six seasons. The match was played in front of a home crowd at the State Netball Centre against the Victorian Fury. The Sting led most of the match, including the entire second half, winning 63–47 and claiming their first ANL title.

=== Super Netball Reserves ===
In 2025, the Australian Netball Championships (ANC) was rebranded to the Super Netball Reserves by Netball Australia. This new format of the competition ran alongside the Suncorp Super Netball season, with Fever Reserves games taking place alongside the West Coast Fever, usually the day before or after an SSN match at a different venue, or pre- or post-SSN match at the same venue.

Led by Fever 11th player Zoe Cransberg, and featuring Fever training partners Caitlyn Brown, Kelsey Browne and Sloan Burton, the Fever Reserves won all seven home-and-away season matches, qualifying straight into the Grand Final against the second-place finishing Melbourne Mavericks Reserves. They led at every break by at least 7 goals, cruising to a 67–57 win for the inaugural SN Reserves premiership. 2025 Australian World Youth Cup representative Jasmah Haywood was awarded the Player of the Grand Final after scoring 57/64 goals (89% accuracy).

== Grand finals ==
Season	Winners	Score	Runners up	Venue
2017	Western Sting	63–47	Victorian Fury	State Netball Centre, Perth
2025	West Coast Fever Reserves	67–57	Melbourne Mavericks Reserves	Waverley Netball Centre, Melbourne

== Notable players ==
=== 2026 squad ===
2026 West Coast Fever Reserves roster
Players
Coaches

Name	Pos	DOB	Height	Club	Nat	Caps
Scarlet Jauncey (Note: Training partner for West Coast Fever) (c)	GD, GK		–	West Coast Warriors	(Australia)
Caitlyn Brown	GD, GK		–	Western Roar	(Australia)
Sloan Burton	GA, GS		–	Comets	(Australia)
Sophie Eastaugh (vc)	GS, WA, GA		–	Fremantle Sharks	(Australia)
Jasmah Haywood (injured)	GS, GA		–	Comets	(Australia)
Tierrah Miller	WA,C		–	Southside Demons	(Australia)
Eva Petkovic	GK, GD		–	Western Roar	(Australia)
Jessica Repacholi (vc)	WD, C		–	Fremantle Sharks	(Australia)
Charisse Rond	C, WA		–	Western Roar	(Australia)
Indiana Squires	WD, GD		–	Fremantle Sharks	(Australia)
Teagan Begovic (Note: Training partner for Fever Reserves)	GA, WA		–	Western Roar	(Australia)
Ava Buselich	WD, C, GD		–	West Coast Warriors	(Australia)
Aitaua Enari (injured)	GS, GA		–	Comets	(Australia)
Skyla Payne	GS		–	West Coast Warriors	(Australia)
Halle Richards (injured)	GS, GA		–	Western Roar	(Australia)
Clara Wigley (injured)	C, WA, WD		–	Comets	(Australia)

Head coach

- (Australia) Guy Keane

Assistant coach

- (Australia) Karly Guadagnin

Notes

- (c) – Captain
- (cc) – Co-captain
- (vc) – Vice-captain
- – Injury / maternity leave
- (TRP) – Temporary Replacement Player
Player profiles: Team website
Last updated: 24 April 2026

=== Internationals ===
Australia

- Sunday Aryang
- Kate Beveridge
- Ashleigh Brazill
- Kelsey Browne
- Courtney Bruce
- Rudi Ellis
- Sophie Garbin
- Natalie Medhurst
- Verity Simmons
- Donnell Wallam

New Zealand

- Erena Mikaere

England

- Chelsea Pitman
- Fran Williams

=== West Coast Fever ===
- Jessica Anstiss
- Ruth Aryang
- Sunday Aryang
- Kirby Bentley
- Kate Beveridge
- Ashleigh Brazill
- Caitlyn Brown
- Kelsey Browne
- Courtney Bruce
- Sloan Burton
- Ingrid Colyer
- Emma Cosh
- Jordan Cransberg
- Zoe Cransberg
- Rudi Ellis
- Andrea Gilmore
- Alicia Janz
- Josie Janz-Dawson
- Jasmine Keene
- Annika Lee-Jones
- Olivia Lewis
- Natalie Medhurst
- Chelsea Pitman
- Lindal Rohde
- Verity Simmons
- Nikala Smith
- Kaylia Stanton
- Olivia Wilkinson
- Fran Williams

=== League MVP ===
Season	Player
2014	Ashleigh Brazill
2017	Sophie Garbin

== Head coaches ==
Coach	Years
Michelle Wilkins	2009–2010
Jon Fletcher	2011–2012
Stacey Rosman	2013–2014
Michelle Wilkins	2015–2017
Andrea McCulloch	2018
Karly Guadagnin	2019
Tasha Richards	2020
Belinda Reynolds	2021–2022
Guy Keane	2023–present

== Premierships ==
- Australian Netball League
  - Winners: 2017
- Super Netball Reserves
  - Winners: 2025
