= 2022 Suncorp Super Netball season =

- League: Suncorp Super Netball
- Sport: Netball
- Duration: 26 March – 3 July
- Teams: 8
- TV partner: Fox Sports
- Streaming partner: Kayo Sports

Regular season
- Minor premiers: Melbourne Vixens
- Season MVP: Jhaniele Fowler
- Top scorer: Jhaniele Fowler (929 points)

Finals
- Champions: West Coast Fever
- Runners-up: Melbourne Vixens
- Grand Final MVP: Sasha Glasgow

Seasons
- ← 2021 2023 →

The 2022 Suncorp Super Netball season was the sixth season of the premier netball league in Australia. The season commenced on 26 March and concluded with the Grand Final on 3 July. The defending premiers were the New South Wales Swifts, who narrowly missed out on the finals series. The West Coast Fever won their very first premiership in the club's history, after defeating the Melbourne Vixens 70–59 in the Grand Final.

== Teams ==
Team	Home Courts	Coach	Captain(s)	Ref.
Adelaide Thunderbirds	Netball SA Stadium; Adelaide Entertainment Centre	Tania Obst	Hannah Petty	
Collingwood Magpies	John Cain Arena; Silverdome; MyState Bank Arena	Nicole Richardson	Geva Mentor & Ash Brazill	
GIANTS Netball	Ken Rosewall Arena; AIS Arena	Julie Fitzgerald	Jo Harten	
Melbourne Vixens	John Cain Arena; Margaret Court Arena	Simone McKinnis	Kate Moloney & Liz Watson	
NSW Swifts	Ken Rosewall Arena	Briony Akle	Maddy Proud & Paige Hadley	
Queensland Firebirds	Nissan Arena	Megan Anderson	Kim Ravaillion	
Sunshine Coast Lightning	USC Stadium	Kylee Byrne	Steph Wood	
West Coast Fever	RAC Arena	Dan Ryan	Courtney Bruce	

== Player signings ==
Important dates in relation to player signings for the 2022 season were:

- 6–13 September 2021: Clubs have an exclusive window to re-sign any of their existing contracted players, or any of their existing permanent or temporary replacement players. Clubs can also sign any player who was not contracted to another team, either as a squad member, replacement player or a training partner in 2021.
- 13 September – 8 October 2021: The period for free agency signings is open, and players can be contracted by any club without restriction. By 8 October all clubs must have signed 10 senior contracted players to their list.
- 9 October – 31 December 2021: Training partners can be signed.

The following table is a list of players who moved clubs/leagues into Super Netball, or were elevated to a permanent position in the senior team during the off-season. It does not include players who were re-signed by their original Super Netball clubs.

Name	Moving from	Moving to	Ref
(Australia) Teigan O'Shannassy	(Australia) New South Wales Swifts (training partner)	New South Wales Swifts	
(Australia) Allie Smith	(Australia) Melbourne Vixens	New South Wales Swifts	
(Australia) Kelly Singleton	(Australia) New South Wales Swifts (training partner)	New South Wales Swifts	
(Australia) Lauren Moore	(Australia) New South Wales Swifts	GIANTS Netball	
(Australia) Amy Sligar	(Australia) GIANTS Netball (training partner)	GIANTS Netball	
(Australia) Matisse Letherbarrow	(Australia) GIANTS Netball (training partner)	GIANTS Netball	
(Australia) Annie Miller	(Australia) GIANTS Netball (training partner)	Sunshine Coast Lightning	
(Jamaica) Kadie-Ann Dehaney	(Australia) Melbourne Vixens	Sunshine Coast Lightning	
(Australia) Tara Hinchliffe	(Australia) Queensland Firebirds	Sunshine Coast Lightning	
(Australia) Reilley Batcheldor	(Australia) Queensland Firebirds (training partner)	Sunshine Coast Lightning	
(Australia) Rudi Ellis	(Australia) Queensland Firebirds	West Coast Fever	
(Australia) Kiera Austin	(Australia) GIANTS Netball	Melbourne Vixens	
(Australia) Rahni Samason	(Australia) Melbourne Vixens (training partner)	Melbourne Vixens	
(Australia) Hannah Mundy	(Australia) Melbourne Vixens (training partner)	Melbourne Vixens	
(Australia) Olivia Lewis	(Australia) West Coast Fever	Melbourne Vixens	
(Australia) Ruby Bakewell-Doran	(Australia) Queensland Firebirds (training partner)	Queensland Firebirds	
(Australia) Mia Stower	(Australia) Queensland Firebirds (training partner)	Queensland Firebirds	
(England) Eboni Usoro-Brown	(England) Team Bath	Queensland Firebirds	
(Australia) Tayla Williams	(Australia) Adelaide Thunderbirds (training partner)	Adelaide Thunderbirds	
(Australia) Tippah Dwan	(Australia) Queensland Firebirds	Adelaide Thunderbirds	
(Australia) Sophie Garbin	(Australia) New South Wales Swifts	Collingwood Magpies	
(Australia) Maggie Lind	(Australia) Collingwood Magpies (training partner)	Collingwood Magpies	

== Pre-season tournament ==
- Source: Click here

For the first time since 2019, the pre-season Team Girls Cup competition was staged. The round-robin and playoff tournament was held at the Melbourne Sports Centre from Friday 25 February to Sunday 27 February. The eight Super Netball teams were split into two groups of four and played each of their group opponents once, before playing an inter-group match to determine places from first to eighth.

The tournament was won by the Melbourne Vixens, who defeated the West Coast Fever 45–43 in the final.

=== Pool A Fixtures ===
Pos	Team	Pld	W	D	L	GF	GA	GD	Pts	Qualification
1	Melbourne Vixens	3	3	0	0	121	101	+20	12	Final
2	Sunshine Coast Lightning	3	1	1	1	131	132	−1	6	Classification matches
3	Queensland Firebirds	3	1	0	2	124	136	−12	4	Classification matches
4	New South Wales Swifts	3	0	1	2	110	117	−7	2	Classification matches

Updated to match(es) played on 26 February 2022. Source:

25 February 2022; 16:00	Report; Stats	New South Wales Swifts	43 – 43	Sunshine Coast Lightning	Melbourne Sports Centre

25 February 2022; 18:00	Report; Stats	Melbourne Vixens	45 – 37	Queensland Firebirds	Melbourne Sports Centre

26 February 2022; 13:00	Report; Stats	Sunshine Coast Lightning	50 – 45	Queensland Firebirds	Melbourne Sports Centre

26 February 2022; 14:00	Report; Stats	Melbourne Vixens	32 – 26	New South Wales Swifts	Melbourne Sports Centre

26 February 2022; 19:00	Report; Stats	Queensland Firebirds	42 – 41	New South Wales Swifts	Melbourne Sports Centre

26 February 2022; 20:00	Report; Stats	Sunshine Coast Lightning	38 – 44	Melbourne Vixens	Melbourne Sports Centre

=== Pool B Fixtures ===
Pos	Team	Pld	W	D	L	GF	GA	GD	Pts	Qualification
1	West Coast Fever	3	3	0	0	137	109	+28	12	Final
2	Adelaide Thunderbirds	3	2	0	1	111	107	+4	8	Classification matches
3	Collingwood Magpies	3	1	0	2	118	133	−15	4	Classification matches
4	Giants Netball	3	0	0	3	116	133	−17	0	Classification matches

Updated to match(es) played on 26 February 2022. Source:

25 February 2022; 17:00	Report; Stats	Giants Netball	41 – 47	West Coast Fever	Melbourne Sports Centre

25 February 2022; 19:00	Report; Stats	Collingwood Magpies	30 – 45	Adelaide Thunderbirds	Melbourne Sports Centre

26 February 2022; 11:00	Report; Stats	Adelaide Thunderbirds	28 – 40	West Coast Fever	Melbourne Sports Centre

26 February 2022; 12:00	Report; Stats	Giants Netball	38 – 48	Collingwood Magpies	Melbourne Sports Centre

26 February 2022; 17:00	Report; Stats	Adelaide Thunderbirds	38 – 37	Giants Netball	Melbourne Sports Centre

26 February 2022; 18:00	Report; Stats	West Coast Fever	50 – 40	Collingwood Magpies	Melbourne Sports Centre

=== Finals ===
27 February 2022; 13:00	Report; Stats	New South Wales Swifts	27 – 41	Giants Netball	Melbourne Sports Centre

27 February 2022; 14:00	Report; Stats	Queensland Firebirds	52 – 50	Collingwood Magpies	Melbourne Sports Centre

27 February 2022; 15:00	Report; Stats	Sunshine Coast Lightning	32 – 53	Adelaide Thunderbirds	Melbourne Sports Centre

27 February 2022; 16:30	Report; Stats	Melbourne Vixens	45 – 43	West Coast Fever	Melbourne Sports Centre

Place	Team
Champions	Melbourne Vixens
Runners-up	West Coast Fever
Third	Adelaide Thunderbirds
4	Sunshine Coast Lightning
5	Queensland Firebirds
6	Collingwood Magpies
7	Giants Netball
8	New South Wales Swifts

2022 #TeamGirls Cup winners

== Regular season ==
- Source: Click here

=== Round 1 ===
Sat 26 Mar	Adelaide Thunderbirds	54 – 50	Collingwood Magpies	Netball SA Stadium
4.30pm	2 Goal Shots; Dwan 3/5 (60%); Horjus 2/3 (67%); Potgieter 0/1 (0%); 1 Goal Shots; Potgieter 28/32 (88%); Horjus 8/8 (100%); Dwan 8/9 (89%)	Report; Stats	2 Goal Shots; Sinclair 2/3 (67%); Garbin 0/1 (0%); 1 Goal Shots; Nelson 38/43 (88%); Garbin 5/7 (71%); Sinclair 3/5 (60%)

Sat 26 Mar	New South Wales Swifts	55 – 57	Giants Netball	Ken Rosewall Arena
7.00pm	2 Goal Shots; Wallace 3/6 (50%); Housby 3/6 (50%); Singleton 0/1 (0%); 1 Goal Shots; Wallace 30/31 (97%); Housby 12/14 (86%); Singleton 1/3 (33%)	Report; Stats	2 Goal Shots; Dwyer 2/5 (40%); Harten 1/6 (17%); 1 Goal Shots; Dwyer 26/28 (93%); Harten 25/28 (89%)	Attendance: 7,261

Sun 27 Mar	Queensland Firebirds	65 – 70	Melbourne Vixens	Nissan Arena
1.00pm	2 Goal Shots; Bueta 3/8 (38%); Wallam 2/5 (40%); Stower 1/2 (50%); 1 Goal Shots; Wallam 41/43 (95%); Bueta 12/12 (100%)	Report; Stats	2 Goal Shots; Samason 2/2 (100%); Kumwenda 1/5 (20%); Austin 0/1 (0%); 1 Goal Shots; Kumwenda 42/43 (98%); Samason 13/13 (100%); Austin 9/13 (69%)

Sun 27 Mar	West Coast Fever	82 – 63	Sunshine Coast Lightning	RAC Arena
1.00pm	2 Goal Shots; Glasgow 4/5 (80%); Fowler 0/2 (0%); 1 Goal Shots; Fowler 65/65 (100%); Glasgow 8/10 (80%); Teague-Neeld 1/3 (33%)	Report; Stats	2 Goal Shots; Wood 5/9 (56%); Batcheldor 2/5 (40%); Koenen 1/3 (33%); 1 Goal Shots; Koenen 24/25 (96%); Wood 13/17 (76%); Batcheldor 10/10 (100%)

=== Round 2 ===
Sat 2 Apr	New South Wales Swifts	48 – 53	Melbourne Vixens	Ken Rosewall Arena
5.00pm	2 Goal Shots; Housby 5/11 (45%); Fawns 1/2 (50%); 1 Goal Shots; Housby 19/22 (86%); Fawns 14/16 (88%); Singleton 3/3 (100%)	Report; Stats	2 Goal Shots; Samason 3/4 (75%); Kumwenda 0/2 (0%); 1 Goal Shots; Kumwenda 41/42 (98%); Samason 4/7 (57%); Austin 2/3 (67%)

Sat 2 Apr	Sunshine Coast Lightning	54 – 82	Queensland Firebirds	USC Stadium
7.00pm	2 Goal Shots; Batcheldor 3/8 (38%); Koenen 0/1 (0%); Lawrie 0/3 (0%); 1 Goal Shots; Koenen 24/28 (86%); Batcheldor 22/25 (88%); Lawrie 2/2 (100%)	Report; Stats	2 Goal Shots; Wallam 4/5 (80%); Stower 2/4 (50%); Bueta 0/1 (0%); 1 Goal Shots; Wallam 45/50 (90%); Bueta 23/25 (92%); Stower 2/2 (100%)

Sun 3 Apr	Collingwood Magpies	53 – 70	West Coast Fever	John Cain Arena
2.00pm	2 Goal Shots; Garbin 3/9 (33%); Sinclair 0/3 (0%); Nelson 0/1 (0%); 1 Goal Shots; Nelson 36/40 (90%); Garbin 10/13 (77%); Sinclair 1/2 (50%)	Report; Stats	2 Goal Shots; Glasgow 2/3 (67%); Cosh 0/1 (0%); 1 Goal Shots; Fowler 58/61 (95%); Glasgow 8/11 (73%)

Sun 3 Apr	Adelaide Thunderbirds	56 – 43	Giants Netball	Netball SA Stadium
3.30pm	2 Goal Shots; Dwan 2/5 (40%); Horjus 1/1 (100%); Potgieter 0/1 (0%); 1 Goal Shots; Potgieter 31/34 (91%); Horjus 12/14 (86%); Dwan 7/8 (88%)	Report; Stats	2 Goal Shots; Harten 6/13 (46%); Letherbarrow 3/6 (50%); Frketic 0/1 (0%); 1 Goal Shots; Harten 17/21 (81%); Letherbarrow 7/12 (58%); Frketic 1/2 (50%)

=== Round 3 ===
Sat 9 Apr	Melbourne Vixens	64 – 52	Giants Netball	John Cain Arena
5.00pm	2 Goal Shots; Austin 2/4 (50%); Kumwenda 1/3 (33%); 1 Goal Shots; Kumwenda 36/38 (95%); Austin 22/23 (96%)	Report; Stats	2 Goal Shots; Harten 5/11 (45%); Dwyer 4/5 (80%); 1 Goal Shots; Harten 20/23 (87%); Dwyer 14/16 (88%)

Sat 9 Apr	New South Wales Swifts	75 – 64	Collingwood Magpies	Ken Rosewall Arena
7.00pm	2 Goal Shots; Housby 4/4 (100%); 1 Goal Shots; Housby 39/44 (89%); Fawns 24/27 (89%); Singleton 4/4 (100%)	Report; Stats	2 Goal Shots; Sinclair 7/9 (78%); Garbin 1/2 (50%); 1 Goal Shots; Nelson 26/26 (100%); Garbin 19/19 (100%); Sinclair 3/4 (75%)

Sun 10 Apr	Queensland Firebirds	69 – 77	West Coast Fever	Nissan Arena
2.00pm	2 Goal Shots; Bueta 5/5 (100%); Wallam 4/10 (40%); 1 Goal Shots; Wallam 39/42 (93%); Bueta 12/17 (71%)	Report; Stats	2 Goal Shots; Glasgow 7/12 (58%); Fowler 1/2 (50%); 1 Goal Shots; Fowler 51/52 (98%); Glasgow 10/15 (67%)	Attendance: 3,332

Sun 10 Apr	Adelaide Thunderbirds	51 – 52	Sunshine Coast Lightning	Netball SA Stadium
3.30pm	2 Goal Shots; Potgieter 1/1 (100%); Dwan 1/3 (33%); Horjus 0/1 (0%); 1 Goal Shots; Potgieter 27/32 (84%); Horjus 13/14 (93%); Dwan 7/11 (64%)	Report; Stats	2 Goal Shots; Wood 3/6 (50%); Batcheldor 2/4 (50%); 1 Goal Shots; Koenen 34/41 (83%); Wood 5/6 (83%); Batcheldor 3/3 (100%)

=== Round 4 ===
Tue 12 Apr	Melbourne Vixens	75 – 66	West Coast Fever	John Cain Arena
6.00pm	2 Goal Shots; Austin 4/6 (67%); Samason 3/3 (100%); Kumwenda 1/4 (25%); 1 Goal Shots; Kumwenda 31/32 (97%); Austin 25/29 (86%); Samason 3/3 (100%)	Report; Stats	2 Goal Shots; Glasgow 7/11 (64%); Fowler 0/3 (0%); 1 Goal Shots; Fowler 48/50 (96%); Glasgow 2/3 (67%); Teague-Neeld 1/1 (100%); Cosh 1/1 (100%)

Tue 12 Apr	Giants Netball	59 – 72	Queensland Firebirds	Ken Rosewall Arena
8.00pm	2 Goal Shots; Harten 5/10 (50%); Dwyer 1/8 (13%); 1 Goal Shots; Harten 29/30 (97%); Dwyer 18/22 (82%)	Report; Stats	2 Goal Shots; Stower 1/1 (100%); Wallam 1/2 (50%); Bueta 0/1 (0%); 1 Goal Shots; Wallam 44/51 (86%); Bueta 23/23 (100%); Stower 1/1 (100%)

Wed 13 Apr	Collingwood Magpies	74 – 64	Sunshine Coast Lightning	John Cain Arena
6.00pm	2 Goal Shots; Allen 3/6 (50%); 1 Goal Shots; Nelson 57/61 (93%); Allen 11/13 (85%)	Report; Stats	2 Goal Shots; Batcheldor 4/7 (57%); Wood 4/9 (44%); 1 Goal Shots; Koenen 32/33 (97%); Wood 11/15 (73%); Batcheldor 5/5 (100%)

Wed 13 Apr	Adelaide Thunderbirds	44 – 45	New South Wales Swifts	Netball SA Stadium
7.30pm	2 Goal Shots; Horjus 2/2 (100%); Dwan 0/1 (0%); 1 Goal Shots; Potgieter 32/35 (91%); Dwan 5/8 (63%); Horjus 3/5 (60%)	Report; Stats	2 Goal Shots; Housby 5/9 (56%); 1 Goal Shots; Housby 23/29 (79%); Fawns 8/11 (73%); Singleton 4/6 (67%)

=== Round 5 ===
Sat 16 Apr	Sunshine Coast Lightning	71 – 58	Melbourne Vixens	USC Stadium
5.00pm	2 Goal Shots; Wood 5/6 (83%); 1 Goal Shots; Koenen 45/49 (92%); Wood 16/18 (89%)	Report; Stats	2 Goal Shots; Austin 4/7 (57%); Samason 2/4 (50%); Kumwenda 0/1 (0%); 1 Goal Shots; Kumwenda 31/32 (97%); Austin 13/15 (87%); Samason 2/3 (67%)

Sat 16 Apr	Giants Netball	76 – 61	Collingwood Magpies	Ken Rosewall Arena
7.00pm	2 Goal Shots; Harten 2/2 (100%); Dwyer 1/3 (33%); 1 Goal Shots; Harten 48/48 (100%); Dwyer 22/23 (96%)	Report; Stats	2 Goal Shots; Allen 3/7 (43%); 1 Goal Shots; Nelson 48/51 (94%); Allen 7/9 (78%)

Sun 17 Apr	West Coast Fever	76 – 58	New South Wales Swifts	RAC Arena
12.00pm	2 Goal Shots; Glasgow 5/11 (45%); Fowler 2/2 (100%); 1 Goal Shots; Fowler 58/61 (95%); Glasgow 4/6 (67%)	Report; Stats	2 Goal Shots; Housby 10/16 (63%); Singleton 2/3 (67%); 1 Goal Shots; Housby 19/24 (79%); Singleton 10/13 (77%); Fawns 5/7 (71%)

Sun 17 Apr	Queensland Firebirds	60 – 50	Adelaide Thunderbirds	Nissan Arena
4.00pm	2 Goal Shots; Wallam 4/8 (50%); Bueta 0/1 (0%); 1 Goal Shots; Bueta 26/27 (96%); Wallam 26/29 (90%)	Report; Stats	2 Goal Shots; Horjus 3/5 (60%); Dwan 3/10 (30%); 1 Goal Shots; Potgieter 20/23 (87%); Dwan 15/17 (88%); Horjus 3/3 (100%)

=== Round 6 ===
Sat 23 Apr	New South Wales Swifts	62 – 69	Sunshine Coast Lightning	Ken Rosewall Arena
5.00pm	2 Goal Shots; Housby 5/11 (45%); Fawns 1/4 (25%); Singleton 0/2 (0%); 1 Goal Shots; Housby 26/31 (84%); Fawns 20/24 (83%); Singleton 4/4 (100%)	Report; Stats	2 Goal Shots; Batcheldor 4/5 (80%); Wood 1/2 (50%); 1 Goal Shots; Koenen 48/49 (98%); Wood 7/8 (88%); Batcheldor 4/4 (100%)

Sat 23 Apr	Melbourne Vixens	53 – 47	Adelaide Thunderbirds	John Cain Arena
7.00pm	2 Goal Shots; Austin 2/3 (67%); Kumwenda 0/1 (0%); 1 Goal Shots; Kumwenda 38/41 (93%); Austin 11/17 (65%)	Report; Stats	2 Goal Shots; Austin 1/3 (33%); Horjus 1/3 (33%); Dwan 1/4 (25%); 1 Goal Shots; Austin 17/18 (94%); Dwan 14/16 (88%); Horjus 10/11 (91%)

Sun 24 Apr	Queensland Firebirds	59 – 67	Collingwood Magpies	Nissan Arena
2.00pm	2 Goal Shots; Bueta 2/4 (50%); Wallam 2/9 (22%); 1 Goal Shots; Wallam 29/32 (91%); Bueta 22/23 (96%)	Report; Stats	2 Goal Shots; Garbin 0/1 (0%); Sinclair 0/1 (0%); 1 Goal Shots; Nelson 54/65 (83%); Garbin 11/17 (65%); Sinclair 2/3 (67%)

Sun 24 Apr	Giants Netball	74 – 73	West Coast Fever	Ken Rosewall Arena
4.00pm	2 Goal Shots; Dwyer 5/6 (83%); Harten 1/2 (50%); 1 Goal Shots; Harten 32/34 (94%); Dwyer 30/32 (94%)	Report; Stats	2 Goal Shots; Teague-Neeld 5/8 (63%); Fowler 0/2 (0%); 1 Goal Shots; Fowler 62/63 (98%); Teague-Neeld 1/2 (50%)

=== Round 7 ===
Sat 30 Apr	Queensland Firebirds	73 – 60	New South Wales Swifts	Nissan Arena
5.00pm	2 Goal Shots; Wallam 1/1 (100%); 1 Goal Shots; Wallam 55/64 (86%); Bueta 16/17 (94%)	Report; Stats	2 Goal Shots; Housby 5/7 (71%); Singleton 1/3 (33%); 1 Goal Shots; Housby 27/31 (87%); Fawns 15/21 (71%); Singleton 6/8 (75%)

Sat 30 Apr	Adelaide Thunderbirds	51 – 60	West Coast Fever	Netball SA Stadium
6.30pm	2 Goal Shots; Horjus 4/6 (67%); Dwan 3/6 (50%); 1 Goal Shots; Potgieter 23/24 (96%); Horjus 10/13 (77%); Dwan 4/4 (100%)	Report; Stats	2 Goal Shots; Cosh 1/1 (100%); Glasgow 1/2 (50%); 1 Goal Shots; Fowler 50/51 (98%); Cosh 4/5 (80%); Glasgow 2/5 (40%)

Sun 1 May	Sunshine Coast Lightning	54 – 82	Giants Netball	USC Stadium
2.00pm	2 Goal Shots; Batcheldor 4/7 (57%); Wood 3/6 (50%); 1 Goal Shots; Batcheldor 21/23 (91%); Wood 17/21 (81%); Lee-Jones 2/4 (50%)	Report; Stats	2 Goal Shots; Dwyer 8/8 (100%); Harten 3/6 (50%); Letherbarrow 1/2 (50%); 1 Goal Shots; Harten 35/37 (95%); Dwyer 22/25 (88%); Letherbarrow 1/1 (100%)

Sun 1 May	Melbourne Vixens	60 – 70	Collingwood Magpies	John Cain Arena
4.00pm	2 Goal Shots; Austin 6/11 (55%); Kumwenda 2/8 (25%); 1 Goal Shots; Kumwenda 34/39 (87%); Austin 10/12 (83%)	Report; Stats	2 Goal Shots; Sinclair 2/4 (50%); Garbin 1/1 (100%); 1 Goal Shots; Nelson 48/51 (94%); Garbin 8/9 (89%); Sinclair 8/10 (80%)

=== Round 8 ===
Sat 7 May	Melbourne Vixens	66 – 64	Queensland Firebirds	John Cain Arena
5.00pm	2 Goal Shots; Austin 2/4 (50%); Kumwenda 0/1 (0%); 1 Goal Shots; Kumwenda 51/55 (93%); Austin 11/17 (65%)	Report; Stats	2 Goal Shots; Bueta 1/3 (33%); Wallam 1/5 (20%); 1 Goal Shots; Wallam 47/51 (92%); Bueta 13/14 (93%)

Sat 7 May	Sunshine Coast Lightning	44 – 51	Adelaide Thunderbirds	USC Stadium
7.00pm	2 Goal Shots; Batcheldor 2/6 (33%); Wood 2/8 (25%); 1 Goal Shots; Koenen 15/20 (75%); Wood 14/21 (67%); Batcheldor 7/8 (88%)	Report; Stats	2 Goal Shots; Horjus 3/3 (100%); 1 Goal Shots; Potgieter 36/37 (97%); Horjus 9/12 (75%)

Sun 8 May	West Coast Fever	74 – 69	Collingwood Magpies	RAC Arena
12.00pm	2 Goal Shots; Glasgow 4/7 (57%); 1 Goal Shots; Fowler 61/63 (97%); Glasgow 5/5 (100%)	Report; Stats	2 Goal Shots; Garbin 2/4 (50%); Allen 1/1 (100%); 1 Goal Shots; Nelson 53/60 (88%); Garbin 10/15 (67%)

Sun 8 May	Giants Netball	43 – 52	New South Wales Swifts	Ken Rosewall Arena
4.00pm	2 Goal Shots; Harten 4/8 (50%); Dwyer 1/5 (20%); 1 Goal Shots; Harten 22/22 (100%); Dwyer 11/14 (79%)	Report; Stats	2 Goal Shots; Housby 0/1 (0%); 1 Goal Shots; Housby 35/42 (83%); Singleton 10/10 (100%); Fawns 7/8 (88%)

=== Round 9 ===
Sat 14 May	Sunshine Coast Lightning	65 – 74	West Coast Fever	USC Stadium
5.00pm	2 Goal Shots; Wood 4/4 (100%); Batcheldor 3/7 (43%); Koenen 0/1 (0%); 1 Goal Shots; Koenen 27/28 (96%); Batcheldor 15/20 (75%); Wood 9/12 (75%)	Report; Stats	2 Goal Shots; Cosh 1/2 (50%); Fowler 0/1 (0%); Glasgow 0/2 (0%); 1 Goal Shots; Fowler 66/66 (100%); Glasgow 3/3 (100%); Cosh 3/5 (60%)

Sat 14 May	Giants Netball	63 – 66 (ET)	Melbourne Vixens	Ken Rosewall Arena
7.00pm	2 Goal Shots; Letherbarrow 9/11 (82%); Dwyer 2/3 (67%); Harten 1/2 (50%); 1 Goal Shots; Dwyer 17/21 (81%); Letherbarrow 13/14 (93%); Harten 9/9 (100%)	Report; Stats	2 Goal Shots; Austin 1/2 (50%); 1 Goal Shots; Kumwenda 50/50 (100%); Austin 14/18 (78%)

Sun 15 May	Collingwood Magpies	71 – 67	Queensland Firebirds	MyState Bank Arena
2.00pm	1 Goal Shots; Nelson 65/66 (98%); Garbin 4/4 (100%); Sinclair 2/3 (67%)	Report; Stats	2 Goal Shots; Stower 3/6 (50%); Bueta 2/4 (50%); Wallam 1/4 (25%); 1 Goal Shots; Wallam 31/36 (86%); Bueta 20/21 (95%); Stower 4/6 (67%)

Sun 15 May	New South Wales Swifts	54 – 40	Adelaide Thunderbirds	Ken Rosewall Arena
4.00pm	2 Goal Shots; Fawns 1/1 (100%); Housby 1/2 (50%); 1 Goal Shots; Housby 29/33 (88%); Fawns 15/21 (71%); Singleton 6/7 (86%)	Report; Stats	2 Goal Shots; Dwan 2/9 (22%); 1 Goal Shots; Potgieter 31/35 (89%); Dwan 5/6 (83%); Horjus 0/2 (0%)

=== Round 10 ===
Tue 17 May	Sunshine Coast Lightning	60 – 61	New South Wales Swifts	USC Stadium
6.00pm	2 Goal Shots; Batcheldor 3/4 (75%); Wood 3/6 (50%); Koenen 0/1 (0%); 1 Goal Shots; Koenen 33/38 (87%); Batcheldor 9/9 (100%); Wood 6/8 (75%)	Report; Stats	2 Goal Shots; Fawns 2/3 (67%); Housby 1/2 (50%); 1 Goal Shots; Housby 40/43 (93%); Fawns 8/8 (100%); Singleton 7/10 (70%)

Tue 17 May	West Coast Fever	64 – 70	Melbourne Vixens	RAC Arena
8.00pm	2 Goal Shots; Glasgow 5/8 (63%); Fowler 0/2 (0%); 1 Goal Shots; Fowler 48/49 (98%); Glasgow 4/4 (100%); Cosh 2/5 (40%)	Report; Stats	2 Goal Shots; Austin 1/1 (100%); Kumwenda 0/2 (0%); 1 Goal Shots; Kumwenda 45/46 (98%); Austin 23/28 (82%)

Wed 18 May	Collingwood Magpies	60 – 69	Giants Netball	Silverdome
6.00pm	2 Goal Shots; Sinclair 2/5 (40%); Nelson 0/1 (0%); Garbin 0/2 (0%); 1 Goal Shots; Nelson 50/54 (93%); Garbin 6/7 (86%)	Report; Stats	2 Goal Shots; Harten 10/11 (91%); Dwyer 1/2 (50%); 1 Goal Shots; Harten 31/34 (91%); Dwyer 16/21 (76%)

Wed 18 May	Adelaide Thunderbirds	68 – 55	Queensland Firebirds	Netball SA Stadium
7.30pm	2 Goal Shots; Dwan 2/7 (29%); 1 Goal Shots; Potgieter 46/46 (100%); Dwan 18/20 (90%)	Report; Stats	2 Goal Shots; Stower 3/5 (60%); Bueta 0/2 (0%); Wallam 0/3 (0%); 1 Goal Shots; Bueta 27/27 (100%); Wallam 19/20 (95%); Stower 3/7 (43%)

=== Round 11 ===
Sat 21 May	Queensland Firebirds	61 – 82	Sunshine Coast Lightning	Nissan Arena
5.00pm	2 Goal Shots; Stower 6/8 (75%); Wallam 2/3 (67%); Bueta 0/3 (0%); 1 Goal Shots; Wallam 21/22 (95%); Bueta 20/21 (95%); Stower 4/7 (57%)	Report; Stats	2 Goal Shots; Wood 4/6 (67%); Batcheldor 3/3 (100%); 1 Goal Shots; Koenen 46/52 (88%); Wood 14/17 (82%); Batcheldor 8/9 (89%)	Attendance: 4,306

Sat 21 May	Melbourne Vixens	59 – 53	New South Wales Swifts	John Cain Arena
7.00pm	2 Goal Shots; Austin 1/3 (33%); 1 Goal Shots; Kumwenda 37/41 (90%); Austin 20/23 (87%)	Report; Stats	2 Goal Shots; Housby 4/6 (67%); Singleton 0/1 (0%); Fawns 0/1 (0%); 1 Goal Shots; Housby 31/33 (94%); Singleton 9/9 (100%); Fawns 5/5 (100%)

Sun 22 May	West Coast Fever	86 – 77	Giants Netball	RAC Arena
12.00pm	2 Goal Shots; Glasgow 5/9 (56%); Fowler 1/2 (50%); 1 Goal Shots; Fowler 66/67 (99%); Glasgow 8/10 (80%)	Report; Stats	2 Goal Shots; Harten 8/12 (67%); Dwyer 7/11 (64%); 1 Goal Shots; Harten 37/37 (100%); Dwyer 10/12 (83%)

Sun 22 May	Collingwood Magpies	53 – 58	Adelaide Thunderbirds	State Netball Centre
4.00pm	2 Goal Shots; Sinclair 7/7 (100%); Garbin 2/4 (50%); 1 Goal Shots; Nelson 30/30 (100%); Garbin 3/5 (60%); Sinclair 2/2 (100%)	Report; Stats	2 Goal Shots; Dwan 0/2 (0%); 1 Goal Shots; Austin 49/53 (92%); Dwan 9/10 (90%)

=== Round 12 ===
Sat 28 May	Collingwood Magpies	66 – 58	New South Wales Swifts	John Cain Arena
6.00pm	2 Goal Shots; Sinclair 4/4 (100%); 1 Goal Shots; Nelson 52/52 (100%); Sinclair 3/3 (100%); Garbin 3/5 (60%)	Report; Stats	2 Goal Shots; Housby 4/9 (44%); Singleton 1/3 (33%); 1 Goal Shots; Housby 29/35 (83%); Singleton 17/20 (85%); Fawns 2/4 (50%)

Sat 28 May	West Coast Fever	68 – 72	Queensland Firebirds	RAC Arena
6.00pm	2 Goal Shots; Glasgow 2/3 (67%); 1 Goal Shots; Fowler 60/60 (100%); Glasgow 4/8 (50%)	Report; Stats	2 Goal Shots; Stower 2/2 (100%); 1 Goal Shots; Bueta 40/41 (98%); Wallam 24/27 (89%); Stower 4/4 (100%)

Sun 29 May	Melbourne Vixens	64 – 60	Sunshine Coast Lightning	John Cain Arena
2.00pm	2 Goal Shots; Austin 1/2 (50%); 1 Goal Shots; Kumwenda 43/51 (84%); Austin 19/24 (79%)	Report; Stats	2 Goal Shots; Wood 5/8 (63%); Batcheldor 3/4 (75%); 1 Goal Shots; Koenen 29/29 (100%); Wood 8/8 (100%); Batcheldor 7/10 (70%)

Sun 29 May	Giants Netball	59 – 50	Adelaide Thunderbirds	Ken Rosewall Arena
4.00pm	2 Goal Shots; Harten 2/6 (33%); Dwyer 1/3 (33%); 1 Goal Shots; Dwyer 28/30 (93%); Harten 25/28 (89%)	Report; Stats	2 Goal Shots; Austin 2/3 (67%); Dwan 2/3 (67%); 1 Goal Shots; Austin 34/39 (87%); Dwan 8/9 (89%)

=== Round 13 ===
Sat 4 Jun	Queensland Firebirds	72 – 73	Giants Netball	Nissan Arena
5.00pm	2 Goal Shots; Wallam 4/4 (100%); Bueta 0/1 (0%); 1 Goal Shots; Wallam 37/39 (95%); Bueta 27/27 (100%)	Report; Stats	2 Goal Shots; Harten 4/7 (57%); Dwyer 2/3 (67%); 1 Goal Shots; Harten 36/38 (95%); Dwyer 25/26 (96%)

Sat 4 Jun	Adelaide Thunderbirds	47 – 51	Melbourne Vixens	Adelaide Entertainment Centre
6.30pm	2 Goal Shots; Dwan 1/2 (50%); 1 Goal Shots; Potgieter 36/40 (90%); Dwan 9/10 (90%)	Report; Stats	2 Goal Shots; Austin 1/2 (50%); Kumwenda 1/4 (25%); 1 Goal Shots; Kumwenda 32/34 (94%); Austin 15/18 (83%)

Sun 5 Jun	New South Wales Swifts	72 – 73	West Coast Fever	Ken Rosewall Arena
2.00pm	2 Goal Shots; Housby 8/15 (53%); Fawns 0/1 (0%); 1 Goal Shots; Housby 31/40 (78%); Singleton 14/19 (74%); Fawns 11/13 (85%)	Report; Stats	2 Goal Shots; Glasgow 3/5 (60%); 1 Goal Shots; Fowler 64/66 (97%); Glasgow 3/5 (60%)

Sun 5 Jun	Sunshine Coast Lightning	62 – 68	Collingwood Magpies	USC Stadium
4.00pm	2 Goal Shots; Wood 6/11 (55%); Batcheldor 0/2 (0%); 1 Goal Shots; Koenen 29/34 (85%); Wood 20/25 (80%); Batcheldor 1/2 (50%)	Report; Stats	2 Goal Shots; Sinclair 1/2 (50%); 1 Goal Shots; Nelson 57/61 (93%); Sinclair 9/13 (69%); Garbin 0/2 (0%)

=== Round 14 ===
Sat 11 Jun	Giants Netball	68 – 65	Sunshine Coast Lightning	Ken Rosewall Arena
7.00pm	2 Goal Shots; Dwyer 1/2 (50%); Harten 1/4 (25%); 1 Goal Shots; Harten 44/45 (98%); Dwyer 20/25 (80%)	Report; Stats	2 Goal Shots; Batcheldor 4/6 (67%); Wood 2/5 (40%); 1 Goal Shots; Koenen 39/39 (100%); Batcheldor 11/14 (79%); Wood 3/5 (60%)

Sun 12 Jun	West Coast Fever	68 – 57	Adelaide Thunderbirds	RAC Arena
12.00pm	2 Goal Shots; Glasgow 6/7 (86%); Fowler 0/1 (0%); Cosh 0/1 (0%); 1 Goal Shots; Fowler 44/44 (100%); Glasgow 12/18 (67%)	Report; Stats	2 Goal Shots; Horjus 3/5 (60%); Dwan 1/2 (50%); 1 Goal Shots; Potgieter 41/43 (95%); Dwan 5/7 (71%); Horjus 3/3 (100%)

Sun 12 Jun	New South Wales Swifts	63 – 61	Queensland Firebirds	Ken Rosewall Arena
4.00pm	2 Goal Shots; Fawns 2/2 (100%); Housby 1/3 (33%); 1 Goal Shots; Housby 37/39 (95%); Fawns 12/15 (80%); Singleton 8/12 (67%)	Report; Stats	2 Goal Shots; Bueta 1/2 (50%); Stower 1/3 (33%); 1 Goal Shots; Wallam 35/40 (88%); Bueta 22/22 (100%)

Mon 13 Jun	Collingwood Magpies	54 – 56	Melbourne Vixens	John Cain Arena
1.00pm	2 Goal Shots; Garbin 1/1 (100%); Sinclair 0/1 (0%); 1 Goal Shots; Nelson 46/47 (98%); Garbin 6/10 (60%); Sinclair 0/1 (0%)	Report; Stats	2 Goal Shots; Samason 1/1 (100%); Kumwenda 1/2 (50%); Austin 1/2 (50%); 1 Goal Shots; Kumwenda 23/24 (96%); Austin 18/21 (86%); Samason 9/10 (90%)

== Ladder ==
2022 Suncorp Super Netball ladder
Pos	Team	P	W	D	L	GF	GA	%	PTS
1	Melbourne Vixens	14	12	0	2	865	824	104.98	48
2	West Coast Fever	14	10	0	4	1011	925	109.30	40
3	Giants Netball	14	8	0	6	895	886	101.02	32
4	Collingwood Magpies	14	6	0	8	880	902	97.56	24
5	New South Wales Swifts	14	6	0	8	816	838	97.37	24
6	Queensland Firebirds	14	5	0	9	932	928	100.43	20
7	Adelaide Thunderbirds	14	5	0	9	724	747	96.92	20
8	Sunshine Coast Lightning	14	4	0	10	865	938	92.22	16
Last updated: 13 June — Source

== Finals Series ==
=== Major Semi Final ===
Sat 18 June; 7.00pm	Report; Stats	Melbourne Vixens (1)	62–71	West Coast Fever (2)	John Cain Arena; Umpires: Kate Wright, Jemma Cook	Foxtel
Sat 18 June; 7.00pm	Report; Stats	Scoring by quarter: 10-19, 16-19, 16-18, 20-15			John Cain Arena; Umpires: Kate Wright, Jemma Cook	Foxtel
Sat 18 June; 7.00pm	Report; Stats	Scoring by half: 26-38, 36-33			John Cain Arena; Umpires: Kate Wright, Jemma Cook	Foxtel
Sat 18 June; 7.00pm	Report; Stats	2 Goal Shots; Samason 10/14 (71%); Kumwenda 1/1 (100%); Austin 1/2 (50%); 1 Goal Shots; Kumwenda 19/19 (100%); Austin 11/15 (73%); Samason 8/9 (89%)		2 Goal Shots; Glasgow 1/2 (50%); 1 Goal Shots; Fowler 67/69 (97%); Glasgow 2/4 (50%)	John Cain Arena; Umpires: Kate Wright, Jemma Cook	Foxtel

=== Minor Semi Final ===
Sun 19 June; 4.00pm	Report; Stats	Giants Netball (3)	55–48	Collingwood Magpies (4)	Ken Rosewall Arena; Umpires: Bronwen Adams, Tara Warner	Foxtel
Sun 19 June; 4.00pm	Report; Stats	Scoring by quarter: 13-11, 12-17, 18-11, 12-9			Ken Rosewall Arena; Umpires: Bronwen Adams, Tara Warner	Foxtel
Sun 19 June; 4.00pm	Report; Stats	Scoring by half: 25-28, 30-20			Ken Rosewall Arena; Umpires: Bronwen Adams, Tara Warner	Foxtel
Sun 19 June; 4.00pm	Report; Stats	2 Goal Shots; Harten 4/6 (67%); Dwyer 2/3 (67%); 1 Goal Shots; Harten 36/38 (95%); Dwyer 7/11 (64%)		2 Goal Shots; Sinclair 1/3 (33%); 1 Goal Shots; Nelson 40/41 (98%); Garbin 6/6 (100%)	Ken Rosewall Arena; Umpires: Bronwen Adams, Tara Warner	Foxtel

=== Preliminary Final ===
Sat 25 June; 7.00pm	Report; Stats	Melbourne Vixens (1)	55–54	Giants Netball (3)	John Cain Arena; Umpires: Jemma Cook, Tara Warner	Foxtel
Sat 25 June; 7.00pm	Report; Stats	Scoring by quarter: 15-7, 11-21, 12-19, 17-7			John Cain Arena; Umpires: Jemma Cook, Tara Warner	Foxtel
Sat 25 June; 7.00pm	Report; Stats	Scoring by half: 26-28, 29-26			John Cain Arena; Umpires: Jemma Cook, Tara Warner	Foxtel
Sat 25 June; 7.00pm	Report; Stats	2 Goal Shots; Samason 3/5 (60%); 1 Goal Shots; Kumwenda 36/37 (97%); Samason 13/15 (87%)		2 Goal Shots; Harten 7/10 (70%); Dwyer 3/4 (75%); 1 Goal Shots; Dwyer 20/25 (80%); Harten 14/16 (88%)	John Cain Arena; Umpires: Jemma Cook, Tara Warner	Foxtel

=== Grand Final ===
Sun 3 July; 5.00pm	Report; Stats	West Coast Fever (2)	70–59	Melbourne Vixens (1)	RAC Arena; Attendance: 13,908; Umpires: Jemma Cook, Tara Warner	Foxtel
Sun 3 July; 5.00pm	Report; Stats	Scoring by quarter: 18-14, 17-15, 19-16, 16-14			RAC Arena; Attendance: 13,908; Umpires: Jemma Cook, Tara Warner	Foxtel
Sun 3 July; 5.00pm	Report; Stats	Scoring by half: 35-29, 35-30			RAC Arena; Attendance: 13,908; Umpires: Jemma Cook, Tara Warner	Foxtel
Sun 3 July; 5.00pm	Report; Stats	2 Goal Shots; Glasgow 4/9 (44%); 1 Goal Shots; Fowler 58/59 (98%); Glasgow 4/4 (100%)		2 Goal Shots; Austin 4/8 (50%); Samason 2/4 (50%); Kumwenda 0/2 (0%); 1 Goal Shots; Kumwenda 28/29 (97%); Austin 17/19 (89%); Samason 2/2 (100%)	RAC Arena; Attendance: 13,908; Umpires: Jemma Cook, Tara Warner	Foxtel
Sun 3 July; 5.00pm	Report; Stats	Grand Final MVP: Sasha Glasgow			RAC Arena; Attendance: 13,908; Umpires: Jemma Cook, Tara Warner	Foxtel

== Awards ==
The following players, coaches and umpires were awarded by Netball Australia for performances in the 2022 season:

- The Player of the Year Award was won by Jhaniele Fowler of the West Coast Fever.
- The Grand Final MVP Award was won by Sasha Glasgow of the West Coast Fever.
- The Rising Star Award was won by Donnell Wallam of the Queensland Firebirds.
- The Joyce Brown Coach of the Year award was won by Stacey Marinkovich of the Australian Diamonds.
- The Lorna McConchie Umpire of the Year award was won by Jemma Cook of New South Wales.
- The Leading Goalscorer Award was won by Jhaniele Fowler of the West Coast Fever, who scored 929 points in the regular season.
- The following players were named in the Super Netball Team of the Year:

Attackers

- Goal Shooter: Jhaniele Fowler
  (West Coast Fever)
- Goal Attack: Gretel Bueta
  (Queensland Firebirds)

Midcourters

- Wing Attack: Liz Watson
  (Melbourne Vixens)
- Centre: Maddy Proud
  (New South Wales Swifts)
- Wing Defence: Amy Parmenter
  (Giants Netball)

Defenders

- Goal Defence: Latanya Wilson
  (Adelaide Thunderbirds)
- Goal Keeper: Shamera Sterling
  (Adelaide Thunderbirds)

Reserves

- Attack Reserve: Jo Harten
  (Giants Netball)
- Midcourt Reserve: Kelsey Browne
  (Collingwood Magpies)
- Defence Reserve: Courtney Bruce
  (West Coast Fever)
