= 2021 Suncorp Super Netball season =

- League: Suncorp Super Netball
- Sport: Netball
- Duration: 1 May – 28 August
- Teams: 8
- TV partner: Nine Network
- Streaming partner(s): 9Now and Telstra TV

Regular season
- Minor premiers: GIANTS Netball
- Season MVP: Jhaniele Fowler
- Top scorer: Jhaniele Fowler (883 points)

Finals
- Champions: New South Wales Swifts
- Runners-up: GIANTS Netball
- Grand Final MVP: Maddy Turner

Seasons
- ← 2020 2022 →

The 2021 Suncorp Super Netball season was the fifth season of the premier netball league in Australia. The season commenced on 1 May and concluded with the Grand Final on 28 August. The defending premiers were the Melbourne Vixens, but they were unsuccessful in making the finals series. The New South Wales Swifts won their second premiership in three years, after defeating GIANTS Netball 63–59 in the Grand Final.

== Overview ==
=== Teams ===
Team	Home Courts	Coach	Captain/s
Adelaide Thunderbirds	Netball SA Stadium; Adelaide Entertainment Centre	Tania Obst	Hannah Petty
Collingwood Magpies	Melbourne Arena; Silverdome	Nicole Richardson	Geva Mentor
GIANTS Netball	Ken Rosewall Arena; AIS Arena	Julie Fitzgerald	Jo Harten
Melbourne Vixens	Melbourne Arena; Margaret Court Arena	Simone McKinnis	Kate Moloney
NSW Swifts	Ken Rosewall Arena	Briony Akle	Maddy Proud & Paige Hadley
Queensland Firebirds	Nissan Arena	Megan Anderson	Gabi Simpson
Sunshine Coast Lightning	USC Stadium	Kylee Byrne	Karla Pretorius
West Coast Fever	RAC Arena	Stacey Marinkovich	Courtney Bruce

=== Format ===
The season is played over fourteen rounds, allowing every team to play each other twice, once at home and once away. The top four teams on the ladder at the conclusion of the regular season qualify for the finals series. In the first week of the finals series, the 1st ranked team hosts the 2nd ranked team in the major semi-final (with the winner of that match to qualify for the Grand Final) and the 3rd ranked team hosts the 4th ranked team in the minor semi-final (with the loser of that match eliminated). The loser of the major semi-final then hosts the winner of the minor semi-final in the preliminary final. The winner of the major semi-final then hosts the winner of the preliminary final in the Grand Final.

=== Rules ===
The league retained the two-goal super shot rule, which allowed a goal shooter or attacker to score two goals for a shot successfully made in the designated area inside the circle during the last five minutes of each quarter. The league also retained the rolling substitutions that were introduced the previous season. The decision to retain the super shot was met with disapproval from many fans and players, with Australian Netball Players’ Association CEO Kathryn Harby-Williams saying a player survey indicated 60 per cent were opposed to the super shot. Extra time in the event of drawn matches was retained. In the event of a tied score at the end of the fourth quarter, a five-minute period of extra time is played, and if the teams remain tied, the match is declared a draw. The bonus point system, last utilised in the 2019 season, was not implemented, with the league's competition committee saying it would "be shelved for the foreseeable future".

=== West Coast Fever salary cap breach ===
The West Coast Fever commenced the season on negative-12 premiership points after a Netball Australia investigation discovered the club had paid players more than $120,000 above the salary cap in each of the 2018 and 2019 seasons. The Fever were also fined $300,000 ($150,000 of which was suspended), making the penalties the harshest in Australian netball history.

== Player signings ==
Important dates in relation to player signings for the 2021 season were:

- 13 July – 18 October 2020: Clubs had the exclusive right to re-sign any of their existing contracted players, permanent or temporary replacement players or training partners from the Australian Netball League (ANL) on a single year contract for the 2021 season
- 19 October – 16 November 2020: Teams can officially sign any free agents as one of their contracted players on a one-year contract for the 2021 season
- 16–30 November 2020: Teams can commence signing training partners for the 2021 season.

All player contracts were required to expire at the end of the 2021 season in accordance with the provisions of an agreement struck between Netball Australia and the Australian Netball Players’ Association during the COVID-19 pandemic.

The following table is a list of players who moved clubs/leagues into Super Netball, or were elevated to a permanent position in the senior team during the off-season. It does not include players who were re-signed by their original Super Netball clubs.

Name	Moving from	Moving to	Ref
(Australia) Tayla Fraser	(Australia) New South Wales Swifts (training partner)	New South Wales Swifts	
(Australia) Sophie Dwyer	(Australia) GIANTS Netball (training partner)	GIANTS Netball	
(Australia) Kate Shimmin	(Australia) Adelaide Thunderbirds	Sunshine Coast Lightning	
(Australia) Ashlee Unie	(Australia) Sunshine Coast Lightning (training partner)	Sunshine Coast Lightning	
(Australia) Mahalia Cassidy	(Australia) Queensland Firebirds	Sunshine Coast Lightning	
(Australia) Sunday Aryang	(Australia) West Coast Fever (training partner)	West Coast Fever	
(Australia) Emma Cosh	(Australia) West Coast Fever (training partner)	West Coast Fever	
(Australia) Sasha Glasgow	(Australia) Adelaide Thunderbirds	West Coast Fever	
(Australia) Kaylia Stanton	(Australia) West Coast Fever	Melbourne Vixens	
(Australia) Ruby Barkmeyer	(Australia) Melbourne Vixens (training partner)	Melbourne Vixens	
(Australia) Kim Ravaillion	(Australia) Collingwood Magpies (returned from maternity leave)	Queensland Firebirds	
(Australia) Georgie Horjus	(Australia) Southern Force (training partner)	Adelaide Thunderbirds	
(Australia) Matilda Garrett	(Australia) Collingwood Magpies	Adelaide Thunderbirds	
(Australia) Elle McDonald	(Australia) Melbourne Vixens (training partner)	Adelaide Thunderbirds	
(Trinidad and Tobago) Kalifa McCollin	(New Zealand) Southern Steel	Collingwood Magpies	
(Australia) Jacqui Newton	(Australia) Melbourne Vixens (training partner)	Collingwood Magpies	

== Regular season ==
- Source: Click here (all times in AEST)

=== Round 1 ===
Sat 1 May	Melbourne Vixens	51 – 65	West Coast Fever	John Cain Arena
3.00pm	2 Goal Shots; Stanton 2/3 (67%); Kumwenda 1/1 (100%); Barkmeyer 1/1 (100%); 1 Goal Shots; Kumwenda 30/31 (97%); Stanton 9/11 (82%); Barkmeyer 4/7 (57%)	Report; Stats	2 Goal Shots; Teague-Neeld 2/4 (50%); Glasgow 1/1 (100%); Fowler 0/1 (0%); 1 Goal Shots; Fowler 55/59 (93%); Teague-Neeld 2/3 (67%); Glasgow 2/3 (67%)

Sat 1 May	Collingwood Magpies	56 – 67	Sunshine Coast Lightning	John Cain Arena
7.00pm	2 Goal Shots; Sinclair 4/9 (44%); McCollin 1/1 (100%); 1 Goal Shots; Nelson 39/43 (91%); Sinclair 6/9 (67%); McCollin 1/1 (100%)	Report; Stats	2 Goal Shots; Wood 2/3 (67%); Koenen 1/2 (50%); 1 Goal Shots; Koenen 37/42 (88%); Wood 18/21 (86%); Proscovia 6/6 (100%)

Sun 2 May	Queensland Firebirds	66 – 69 (ET)	New South Wales Swifts	Nissan Arena
1.00pm	2 Goal Shots; Bueta 3/4 (75%); Dwan 3/6 (50%); 1 Goal Shots; Aiken 39/46 (85%); Bueta 13/13 (100%); Dwan 2/2 (100%)	Report; Stats	2 Goal Shots; Housby 3/4 (75%); 1 Goal Shots; Wallace 49/49 (100%); Housby 9/10 (90%); Garbin 5/6 (83%)

Sun 2 May	Adelaide Thunderbirds	52 – 66	Giants Netball	Netball SA Stadium
2.30pm	2 Goal Shots; Gooden 5/11 (45%); Horjus 0/3 (0%); 1 Goal Shots; Potgieter 28/29 (97%); Gooden 10/13 (77%); Horjus 4/7 (57%)	Report; Stats	2 Goal Shots; Dwyer 4/6 (67%); Harten 4/7 (57%); Austin 1/2 (50%); 1 Goal Shots; Harten 22/25 (88%); Dwyer 22/27 (81%); Austin 4/7 (57%)

=== Round 2 ===
Sat 8 May	Giants Netball	66 – 54	Collingwood Magpies	Ken Rosewall Arena
3.00pm	2 Goal Shots; Harten 4/10 (40%); Dwyer 2/4 (50%); 1 Goal Shots; Harten 33/35 (94%); Dwyer 21/27 (78%)	Report; Stats	2 Goal Shots; Sinclair 0/4 (0%); McCollin 0/1 (0%); 1 Goal Shots; Nelson 40/43 (93%); Sinclair 11/12 (92%); McCollin 3/4 (75%)

Sat 8 May	West Coast Fever	63 – 55	New South Wales Swifts	RAC Arena
6.00pm	2 Goal Shots; Fowler 1/1 (100%); Glasgow 1/2 (50%); Teague-Neeld 0/2 (0%); 1 Goal Shots; Fowler 54/59 (92%); Glasgow 3/3 (100%); Teague-Neeld 2/3 (67%)	Report; Stats	2 Goal Shots; Wallace 1/3 (33%); Housby 1/3 (33%); 1 Goal Shots; Wallace 33/35 (94%); Housby 9/11 (82%); Garbin 9/9 (100%)

Sun 9 May	Melbourne Vixens	51 – 56	Sunshine Coast Lightning	John Cain Arena
1.00pm	2 Goal Shots; Kumwenda 2/3 (67%); Barkmeyer 1/3 (33%); Stanton 1/4 (25%); 1 Goal Shots; Kumwenda 23/23 (100%); Barkmeyer 11/15 (73%); Stanton 9/12 (75%)	Report; Stats	2 Goal Shots; Wood 1/2 (50%); 1 Goal Shots; Koenen 43/47 (91%); Wood 8/11 (73%); Proscovia 3/3 (100%)

Sun 9 May	Queensland Firebirds	68 – 57	Adelaide Thunderbirds	Nissan Arena
3.00pm	2 Goal Shots; Dwan 5/5 (100%); Bueta 3/6 (50%); Aiken 0/2 (0%); 1 Goal Shots; Aiken 34/35 (97%); Bueta 15/16 (94%); Dwan 3/3 (100%)	Report; Stats	2 Goal Shots; Gooden 6/10 (60%); Potgieter 1/1 (100%); Horjus 1/2 (50%); 1 Goal Shots; Potgieter 28/31 (90%); Gooden 10/11 (91%); Horjus 3/4 (75%)

=== Round 3 ===
Sat 15 May	Collingwood Magpies	60 – 56	Adelaide Thunderbirds	John Cain Arena
3.00pm	2 Goal Shots; Sinclair 5/8 (63%); Nelson 1/1 (100%); 1 Goal Shots; Nelson 35/37 (95%); Sinclair 13/14 (93%)	Report; Stats	2 Goal Shots; Gooden 4/8 (50%); Horjus 2/3 (67%); Potgieter 0/1 (0%); 1 Goal Shots; Potgieter 23/24 (96%); Gooden 13/17 (76%); Horjus 8/10 (80%)

Sat 15 May	Sunshine Coast Lightning	54 – 69	West Coast Fever	USC Stadium
7.00pm	2 Goal Shots; Wood 1/5 (20%); 1 Goal Shots; Koenen 28/30 (93%); Wood 15/17 (88%); Proscovia 9/9 (100%)	Report; Stats	2 Goal Shots; Glasgow 2/3 (67%); Teague-Neeld 0/1 (0%); 1 Goal Shots; Fowler 59/61 (97%); Glasgow 5/5 (100%); Teague-Neeld 1/4 (25%)

Sun 16 May	New South Wales Swifts	55 – 43	Melbourne Vixens	Ken Rosewall Arena
1.00pm	2 Goal Shots; Wallace 2/2 (100%); Garbin 0/1 (0%); 1 Goal Shots; Wallace 46/46 (100%); Housby 3/5 (60%); Garbin 2/4 (50%)	Report; Stats	2 Goal Shots; Kumwenda 2/5 (40%); Stanton 1/4 (25%); Barkmeyer 1/3 (33%); 1 Goal Shots; Kumwenda 26/27 (96%); Stanton 5/9 (56%); Barkmeyer 4/5 (80%)

Sun 16 May	Giants Netball	67 – 60	Queensland Firebirds	Ken Rosewall Arena
5.00pm	2 Goal Shots; Harten 3/9 (33%); Dwyer 1/3 (33%); 1 Goal Shots; Harten 41/44 (93%); Dwyer 18/22 (82%)	Report; Stats	2 Goal Shots; Dwan 4/9 (44%); Bueta 3/7 (43%); Aiken 1/3 (33%); 1 Goal Shots; Aiken 22/26 (85%); Bueta 18/21 (86%); Dwan 4/5 (80%)

=== Round 4 ===
Sat 22 May	Collingwood Magpies	68 – 65	Queensland Firebirds	Silverdome
3.00pm	2 Goal Shots; Sinclair 4/6 (67%); 1 Goal Shots; Nelson 54/55 (98%); Sinclair 6/7 (86%)	Report; Stats	2 Goal Shots; Dwan 4/6 (67%); Aiken 1/1 (100%); Bueta 0/2 (0%); 1 Goal Shots; Aiken 33/37 (89%); Bueta 18/22 (82%); Dwan 4/6 (67%)

Sat 22 May	Adelaide Thunderbirds	62 – 70	West Coast Fever	Netball SA Stadium
6.30pm	2 Goal Shots; Gooden 5/7 (71%); Horjus 1/2 (50%); 1 Goal Shots; Potgieter 25/26 (96%); Horjus 20/24 (83%); Gooden 5/8 (63%)	Report; Stats	2 Goal Shots; Glasgow 2/4 (50%); Fowler 1/2 (50%); Teague-Neeld 0/2 (0%); 1 Goal Shots; Fowler 54/57 (95%); Glasgow 7/10 (70%); Teague-Neeld 3/3 (100%)

Sun 23 May	Sunshine Coast Lightning	58 – 54	New South Wales Swifts	USC Stadium
1.00pm	2 Goal Shots; Wood 4/6 (67%); 1 Goal Shots; Koenen 38/40 (95%); Wood 12/19 (63%)	Report; Stats	2 Goal Shots; Wallace 1/3 (33%); Housby 1/3 (33%); 1 Goal Shots; Wallace 36/37 (97%); Housby 11/12 (92%); Garbin 3/5 (60%)

Sun 23 May	Melbourne Vixens	54 – 68	Giants Netball	John Cain Arena
3.00pm	2 Goal Shots; Kumwenda 4/8 (50%); Stanton 2/4 (50%); 1 Goal Shots; Kumwenda 34/39 (87%); Stanton 6/14 (43%); Barkmeyer 2/2 (100%)	Report; Stats	2 Goal Shots; Harten 6/10 (60%); Dwyer 5/7 (71%); 1 Goal Shots; Harten 23/29 (79%); Dwyer 23/30 (77%)

=== Round 5 ===
Sat 29 May	Queensland Firebirds	64 – 66	Melbourne Vixens	Nissan Arena
3.00pm	2 Goal Shots; Aiken 2/3 (67%); Bueta 2/6 (33%); 1 Goal Shots; Aiken 39/43 (91%); Bueta 16/18 (89%); Dwan 1/1 (100%)	Report; Stats	2 Goal Shots; Samason 8/10 (80%); Kumwenda 2/4 (50%); 1 Goal Shots; Kumwenda 27/28 (96%); Samason 19/19 (100%)

Sun 30 May	Adelaide Thunderbirds	58 – 59	Sunshine Coast Lightning	Netball SA Stadium
12.30pm	2 Goal Shots; Horjus 2/4 (50%); 1 Goal Shots; Potgieter 33/34 (97%); Horjus 21/22 (95%)	Report; Stats	2 Goal Shots; Wood 5/7 (71%); 1 Goal Shots; Koenen 26/28 (93%); Wood 16/19 (84%); Proscovia 7/9 (78%)

Sun 30 May	New South Wales Swifts	62 – 53	Collingwood Magpies	Ken Rosewall Arena
3.00pm	2 Goal Shots; Wallace 3/3 (100%); Housby 2/3 (67%); 1 Goal Shots; Wallace 43/45 (96%); Housby 6/7 (86%); Garbin 3/5 (60%)	Report; Stats	2 Goal Shots; McCollin 1/2 (50%); Sinclair 1/5 (20%); 1 Goal Shots; Nelson 41/43 (95%); Sinclair 6/6 (100%); McCollin 2/3 (67%)

Mon 31 May	West Coast Fever	66 – 65	Giants Netball	RAC Arena
6.00pm	2 Goal Shots; Glasgow 3/4 (75%); 1 Goal Shots; Fowler 55/56 (98%); Glasgow 5/8 (63%); Teague-Neeld 0/2 (0%)	Report; Stats	2 Goal Shots; Harten 9/14 (64%); Dwyer 1/1 (100%); 1 Goal Shots; Dwyer 26/33 (79%); Harten 19/20 (95%)

=== Round 6 ===
Sat 5 Jun	Collingwood Magpies	55 – 78	West Coast Fever	Ken Rosewall Arena
3.00pm	2 Goal Shots; Sinclair 2/5 (40%); Nelson 1/2 (50%); McCollin 1/3 (33%); 1 Goal Shots; Nelson 38/39 (97%); Sinclair 6/7 (86%); McCollin 3/4 (75%)	Report; Stats	2 Goal Shots; Glasgow 5/6 (83%); Teague-Neeld 2/4 (50%); 1 Goal Shots; Fowler 59/60 (98%); Glasgow 3/6 (50%); Teague-Neeld 2/2 (100%)

Sun 6 Jun	Giants Netball	51 – 63	New South Wales Swifts	Ken Rosewall Arena
1.00pm	2 Goal Shots; Dwyer 4/9 (44%); Harten 2/5 (40%); 1 Goal Shots; Harten 21/24 (88%); Dwyer 18/18 (100%)	Report; Stats	1 Goal Shots; Wallace 58/58 (100%); Housby 5/5 (100%)

Sun 6 Jun	Sunshine Coast Lightning	52 – 61	Queensland Firebirds	USC Stadium
3.00pm	2 Goal Shots; Wood 1/5 (20%); Koenen 0/1 (0%); 1 Goal Shots; Koenen 36/41 (88%); Wood 14/16 (88%)	Report; Stats	2 Goal Shots; Aiken 3/3 (100%); Bueta 2/4 (50%); 1 Goal Shots; Aiken 34/37 (92%); Bueta 17/18 (94%)

Sun 6 Jun	Melbourne Vixens	48 – 54	Adelaide Thunderbirds	USC Stadium
6.00pm	2 Goal Shots; Samason 4/7 (57%); Kumwenda 2/4 (50%); 1 Goal Shots; Kumwenda 26/28 (93%); Samason 10/13 (77%)	Report; Stats	2 Goal Shots; Gooden 6/10 (60%); Potgieter 0/1 (0%); Horjus 0/1 (0%); 1 Goal Shots; Potgieter 29/31 (94%); Horjus 12/15 (80%); Gooden 1/2 (50%)

=== Round 7 ===
Sat 12 Jun	Giants Netball	52 – 58	Sunshine Coast Lightning	Ken Rosewall Arena
3.00pm	2 Goal Shots; Harten 3/8 (38%); Dwyer 3/8 (38%); 1 Goal Shots; Harten 25/28 (89%); Dwyer 14/20 (70%); Letherbarrow 1/1 (100%)	Report; Stats	2 Goal Shots; Wood 0/1 (0%); 1 Goal Shots; Koenen 36/40 (90%); Proscovia 16/16 (100%); Wood 6/9 (67%)

Sat 12 Jun	Collingwood Magpies	67 – 51	Melbourne Vixens	Ken Rosewall Arena
5.00pm	2 Goal Shots; Sinclair 3/3 (100%); 1 Goal Shots; Nelson 55/63 (87%); Sinclair 6/9 (67%)	Report; Stats	2 Goal Shots; Kumwenda 2/4 (50%); Samason 2/2 (100%); Stanton 1/1 (100%); 1 Goal Shots; Kumwenda 26/28 (93%); Samason 14/18 (78%); Stanton 1/1 (100%)

Sat 12 Jun	Adelaide Thunderbirds	58 – 53	New South Wales Swifts	Adelaide Entertainment Centre
6.30pm	2 Goal Shots; Horjus 1/2 (50%); 1 Goal Shots; Potgieter 40/40 (100%); Horjus 16/20 (80%)	Report; Stats	2 Goal Shots; Housby 3/4 (75%); Wallace 2/2 (100%); 1 Goal Shots; Housby 23/26 (88%); Wallace 12/13 (92%); Garbin 8/8 (100%)

Sun 13 Jun	Queensland Firebirds	69 – 79	West Coast Fever	Nissan Arena
1.00pm	2 Goal Shots; Bueta 3/9 (33%); Dwan 3/6 (50%); Aiken 1/3 (33%); 1 Goal Shots; Aiken 40/40 (100%); Bueta 14/17 (82%); Dwan 1/2 (50%)	Report; Stats	2 Goal Shots; Teague-Neeld 3/5 (60%); Glasgow 3/3 (100%); 1 Goal Shots; Fowler 62/64 (97%); Teague-Neeld 3/3 (100%); Glasgow 2/2 (100%)

=== Round 8 ===
Sat 19 Jun	New South Wales Swifts	64 – 52	Queensland Firebirds	Ken Rosewall Arena
3.00pm	2 Goal Shots; Wallace 2/5 (40%); 1 Goal Shots; Wallace 49/52 (94%); Housby 11/13 (85%)	Report; Stats	2 Goal Shots; Aiken 1/1 (100%); Bueta 1/4 (25%); Dwan 0/3 (0%); 1 Goal Shots; Aiken 38/48 (79%); Bueta 9/12 (75%); Dwan 1/1 (100%)

Sun 20 Jun	Giants Netball	57 – 41	Adelaide Thunderbirds	Ken Rosewall Arena
1.00pm	2 Goal Shots; Letherbarrow 2/4 (50%); Harten 2/6 (33%); Dwyer 1/2 (50%); 1 Goal Shots; Harten 24/28 (86%); Dwyer 23/28 (82%)	Report; Stats	2 Goal Shots; Gooden 1/4 (25%); Horjus 1/6 (17%); 1 Goal Shots; Potgieter 24/30 (80%); Horjus 12/14 (86%); Gooden 1/4 (25%)

Sat 26 Jun	Sunshine Coast Lightning	67 – 65 (ET)	Collingwood Magpies	USC Stadium
3.00pm	2 Goal Shots; Wood 1/2 (50%); 1 Goal Shots; Koenen 46/52 (88%); Proscovia 11/13 (85%); Wood 8/10 (80%)	Report; Stats	1 Goal Shots; Nelson 52/57 (91%); Sinclair 13/15 (87%)

Thu 22 Jul	West Coast Fever	64 – 50	Melbourne Vixens	Nissan Arena
7.30pm	2 Goal Shots; Cosh 0/1 (0%); Teague-Neeld 0/2 (0%); 1 Goal Shots; Fowler 58/58 (100%); Teague-Neeld 5/10 (50%); Cosh 1/1 (100%)	Report; Stats	2 Goal Shots; Kumwenda 4/8 (50%); Barkmeyer 1/3 (33%); Stanton 0/1 (0%); 1 Goal Shots; Kumwenda 31/33 (94%); Stanton 9/13 (69%)

=== Round 9 ===
Sat 3 Jul	Sunshine Coast Lightning	52 – 55	Melbourne Vixens	John Cain Arena
3.00pm	2 Goal Shots; Koenen 0/1 (0%); Wood 0/1 (0%); 1 Goal Shots; Koenen 26/29 (90%); Wood 15/15 (100%); Proscovia 11/13 (85%)	Report; Stats	2 Goal Shots; Stanton 2/4 (50%); Kumwenda 1/3 (33%); 1 Goal Shots; Kumwenda 33/37 (89%); Stanton 16/17 (94%)

Sun 4 Jul	New South Wales Swifts	66 – 65	West Coast Fever	John Cain Arena
1.00pm	2 Goal Shots; Housby 4/5 (80%); Wallace 0/1 (0%); 1 Goal Shots; Garbin 31/33 (94%); Wallace 16/20 (80%); Housby 11/11 (100%)	Report; Stats	2 Goal Shots; Teague-Neeld 3/3 (100%); Glasgow 3/4 (75%); Fowler 0/1 (0%); 1 Goal Shots; Fowler 47/47 (100%); Glasgow 4/7 (57%); Teague-Neeld 2/2 (100%)

Sun 4 Jul	Adelaide Thunderbirds	62 – 54	Collingwood Magpies	Netball SA Stadium
2.30pm	2 Goal Shots; Horjus 4/5 (80%); 1 Goal Shots; Potgieter 42/45 (93%); Horjus 11/14 (79%); Gooden 1/2 (50%)	Report; Stats	2 Goal Shots; Allen 5/9 (56%); McCollin 2/3 (67%); 1 Goal Shots; Nelson 29/31 (94%); McCollin 8/8 (100%); Allen 3/6 (50%)

Sun 4 Jul	Queensland Firebirds	63 – 52	Giants Netball	John Cain Arena
5.00pm	2 Goal Shots; Bueta 1/3 (33%); Aiken 0/1 (0%); 1 Goal Shots; Aiken 39/43 (91%); Bueta 22/23 (96%)	Report; Stats	2 Goal Shots; Dwyer 7/10 (70%); Harten 3/8 (38%); 1 Goal Shots; Harten 17/21 (81%); Dwyer 15/20 (75%)

=== Round 10 ===
Sat 10 Jul	Melbourne Vixens	48 – 62	New South Wales Swifts	John Cain Arena
3.00pm	2 Goal Shots; Kumwenda 8/13 (62%); Stanton 0/2 (0%); 1 Goal Shots; Kumwenda 23/23 (100%); Stanton 6/8 (75%); Barkmeyer 3/7 (43%)	Report; Stats	2 Goal Shots; Wallace 1/1 (100%); Housby 1/2 (50%); 1 Goal Shots; Wallace 32/32 (100%); Garbin 18/20 (90%); Housby 8/11 (73%)

Sat 10 Jul	West Coast Fever	61 – 65	Sunshine Coast Lightning	RAC Arena
6.00pm	2 Goal Shots; Glasgow 2/3 (67%); Teague-Neeld 2/4 (50%); Fowler 1/1 (100%); 1 Goal Shots; Fowler 44/44 (100%); Teague-Neeld 7/8 (88%)	Report; Stats	2 Goal Shots; Wood 3/3 (100%); 1 Goal Shots; Koenen 43/48 (90%); Wood 16/18 (89%)

Sun 11 Jul	Adelaide Thunderbirds	47 – 63	Queensland Firebirds	Netball SA Stadium
12.30pm	2 Goal Shots; Gooden 1/2 (50%); Horjus 0/2 (0%); 1 Goal Shots; Potgieter 37/38 (97%); Horjus 8/10 (80%)	Report; Stats	2 Goal Shots; Dwan 2/4 (50%); Bueta 1/1 (100%); Aiken 0/1 (0%); 1 Goal Shots; Aiken 42/52 (81%); Bueta 12/13 (92%); Dwan 3/4 (75%)

Sun 11 Jul	Collingwood Magpies	49 – 58	Giants Netball	John Cain Arena
3.00pm	2 Goal Shots; Sinclair 3/5 (60%); Nelson 0/1 (0%); 1 Goal Shots; Nelson 37/43 (86%); Sinclair 6/7 (86%)	Report; Stats	2 Goal Shots; Dwyer 3/5 (60%); Harten 0/2 (0%); 1 Goal Shots; Dwyer 28/33 (85%); Harten 24/27 (89%)

=== Round 11 ===
Sat 17 Jul	Melbourne Vixens	48 – 52	Collingwood Magpies	Netball SA Stadium
12.30pm	2 Goal Shots; Kumwenda 2/5 (40%); Stanton 0/2 (0%); 1 Goal Shots; Kumwenda 31/32 (97%); Stanton 12/15 (80%); Barkmeyer 1/4 (25%)	Report; Stats	2 Goal Shots; Sinclair 1/3 (33%); 1 Goal Shots; Nelson 37/37 (100%); Sinclair 13/14 (93%)

Sat 17 Jul	New South Wales Swifts	55 – 59	Giants Netball	Netball SA Stadium
2.30pm	2 Goal Shots; Housby 2/3 (67%); Wallace 2/5 (40%); 1 Goal Shots; Wallace 37/43 (86%); Housby 7/7 (100%); Garbin 3/4 (75%)	Report; Stats	2 Goal Shots; Harten 3/5 (60%); Dwyer 2/4 (50%); 1 Goal Shots; Harten 30/35 (86%); Dwyer 19/19 (100%)

Sat 17 Jul	West Coast Fever	69 – 44	Adelaide Thunderbirds	RAC Arena
6.00pm	2 Goal Shots; Glasgow 2/4 (50%); Teague-Neeld 1/1 (100%); 1 Goal Shots; Fowler 57/58 (98%); Glasgow 4/8 (50%); Teague-Neeld 2/5 (40%)	Report; Stats	2 Goal Shots; Gooden 5/7 (71%); 1 Goal Shots; Potgieter 26/26 (100%); Horjus 5/7 (71%); Gooden 3/5 (60%)

Mon 19 Jul	Queensland Firebirds	59 – 49	Sunshine Coast Lightning	Nissan Arena
7.00pm	2 Goal Shots; Bueta 1/3 (33%); Aiken 0/1 (0%); 1 Goal Shots; Aiken 40/47 (85%); Bueta 17/17 (100%)	Report; Stats	2 Goal Shots; Koenen 1/4 (25%); Proscovia 0/2 (0%); 1 Goal Shots; Koenen 30/32 (94%); Proscovia 17/20 (85%)

=== Round 12 ===
Tue 27 Jul	Collingwood Magpies	75 – 68	New South Wales Swifts	Nissan Arena
3.30pm	2 Goal Shots; Sinclair 1/2 (50%); 1 Goal Shots; Nelson 69/71 (97%); Sinclair 4/4 (100%)	Report; Stats	2 Goal Shots; Wallace 5/10 (50%); Housby 4/7 (57%); Garbin 0/1 (0%); 1 Goal Shots; Garbin 34/35 (97%); Housby 11/13 (85%); Wallace 5/5 (100%)

Tue 27 Jul	West Coast Fever	79 – 69	Queensland Firebirds	Nissan Arena
6.30pm	2 Goal Shots; Teague-Neeld 2/2 (100%); Glasgow 2/6 (33%); 1 Goal Shots; Fowler 64/66 (97%); Teague-Neeld 4/6 (67%); Glasgow 3/3 (100%)	Report; Stats	2 Goal Shots; Aiken 2/4 (50%); Bueta 1/4 (25%); 1 Goal Shots; Aiken 39/45 (87%); Bueta 24/25 (96%)

Wed 28 Jul	Giants Netball	54 – 45	Melbourne Vixens	Nissan Arena
3.30pm	2 Goal Shots; Letherbarrow 1/1 (100%); Harten 1/4 (25%); Dwyer 0/1 (0%); 1 Goal Shots; Harten 29/34 (85%); Dwyer 20/26 (77%); Letherbarrow 1/2 (50%)	Report; Stats	2 Goal Shots; Kumwenda 5/10 (50%); Stanton 0/2 (0%); 1 Goal Shots; Kumwenda 29/33 (88%); Stanton 4/9 (44%); Barkmeyer 2/2 (100%)

Wed 28 Jul	Sunshine Coast Lightning	60 – 61	Adelaide Thunderbirds	Nissan Arena
6.30pm	2 Goal Shots; Wood 4/6 (67%); 1 Goal Shots; Koenen 27/29 (93%); Wood 18/22 (82%); Proscovia 7/7 (100%)	Report; Stats	2 Goal Shots; Horjus 1/1 (100%); 1 Goal Shots; Potgieter 40/41 (98%); Horjus 19/20 (95%)

=== Round 13 ===
Thu 29 Jul	Queensland Firebirds	59 – 66	Collingwood Magpies	Nissan Arena
6.00pm	2 Goal Shots; Bueta 2/3 (67%); Aiken 2/5 (40%); Dwan 1/4 (25%); 1 Goal Shots; Aiken 27/37 (73%); Bueta 16/18 (89%); Dwan 6/6 (100%)	Report; Stats	2 Goal Shots; Sinclair 3/4 (75%); 1 Goal Shots; Nelson 49/51 (96%); Sinclair 11/15 (73%); McCollin 0/2 (0%)

Mon 2 Aug	Adelaide Thunderbirds	59 – 50	Melbourne Vixens	Nissan Arena
7.30pm	2 Goal Shots; Horjus 1/2 (50%); 1 Goal Shots; Potgieter 43/43 (100%); Horjus 13/13 (100%); Gooden 1/1 (100%)	Report; Stats	2 Goal Shots; Kumwenda 4/9 (44%); Stanton 1/2 (50%); Barkmeyer 1/2 (50%); 1 Goal Shots; Kumwenda 34/35 (97%); Stanton 4/6 (67%); Barkmeyer 0/1 (0%)

Tue 3 Aug	Sunshine Coast Lightning	64 – 63 (ET)	Giants Netball	Nissan Arena
3.30pm	2 Goal Shots; Wood 0/1 (0%); 1 Goal Shots; Koenen 30/31 (97%); Proscovia 21/22 (95%); Wood 13/16 (81%)	Report; Stats	2 Goal Shots; Dwyer 6/7 (86%); Harten 2/3 (67%); 1 Goal Shots; Harten 31/33 (94%); Dwyer 16/22 (73%)

Tue 3 Aug	West Coast Fever	75 – 55	Collingwood Magpies	Nissan Arena
6.30pm	2 Goal Shots; Glasgow 2/6 (33%); Fowler 0/1 (0%); Teague-Neeld 0/3 (0%); 1 Goal Shots; Fowler 62/65 (95%); Glasgow 6/7 (86%); Teague-Neeld 3/4 (75%)	Report; Stats	2 Goal Shots; McCollin 2/4 (50%); Sinclair 1/2 (50%); Allen 1/4 (25%); 1 Goal Shots; Nelson 37/37 (100%); McCollin 7/10 (70%); Sinclair 3/6 (50%)

=== Round 14 ===
Wed 4 Aug	New South Wales Swifts	58 – 53	Adelaide Thunderbirds	Nissan Arena
3.30pm	2 Goal Shots; Housby 1/1 (100%); 1 Goal Shots; Garbin 33/37 (89%); Housby 19/21 (90%); Wallace 4/4 (100%)	Report; Stats	2 Goal Shots; Horjus 2/4 (50%); 1 Goal Shots; Potgieter 34/34 (100%); Horjus 15/18 (83%)

Wed 4 Aug	Melbourne Vixens	58 – 62	Queensland Firebirds	Nissan Arena
6.30pm	2 Goal Shots; Kumwenda 1/1 (100%); Barkmeyer 0/1 (0%); 1 Goal Shots; Kumwenda 30/31 (97%); Stanton 9/11 (82%); Barkmeyer 4/7 (57%)	Report; Stats	2 Goal Shots; Bueta 0/1 (0%); Dwan 0/4 (0%); 1 Goal Shots; Aiken 52/58 (90%); Bueta 9/12 (75%); Dwan 1/2 (50%)

Sat 7 Aug	New South Wales Swifts	69 – 64	Sunshine Coast Lightning	Nissan Arena
12.30pm	2 Goal Shots; Wallace 0/1 (0%); 1 Goal Shots; Wallace 50/51 (98%); Housby 18/20 (90%); Garbin 1/1 (100%)	Report; Stats	2 Goal Shots; Koenen 3/4 (75%); Hunt 1/3 (33%); 1 Goal Shots; Koenen 33/37 (89%); Proscovia 17/19 (89%); Hunt 6/12 (50%)

Sat 7 Aug	West Coast Fever	73 – 75	Giants Netball	Nissan Arena
2.30pm	2 Goal Shots; Teague-Neeld 4/5 (80%); Fowler 1/1 (100%); Glasgow 1/1 (100%); 1 Goal Shots; Fowler 54/54 (100%); Teague-Neeld 4/6 (67%); Glasgow 3/4 (75%)	Report; Stats	2 Goal Shots; Harten 5/6 (83%); Dwyer 3/6 (50%); 1 Goal Shots; Harten 35/36 (97%); Dwyer 24/27 (89%)

== Ladder ==
2021 Suncorp Super Netball ladder
Pos	Team	P	W	D	L	GF	GA	%	PTS
1	Giants Netball	14	9	0	5	853	797	107.03	36
2	New South Wales Swifts	14	9	0	5	853	808	105.57	36
3	West Coast Fever	14	11	0	3	976	835	116.89	32*
4	Sunshine Coast Lightning	14	8	0	6	825	834	98.92	32
5	Queensland Firebirds	14	6	0	8	880	873	100.8	24
6	Collingwood Magpies	14	6	0	8	829	882	93.99	24
7	Adelaide Thunderbirds	14	5	0	9	764	835	91.5	20
8	Melbourne Vixens	14	2	0	12	718	834	86.09	8
Last updated: 7 August 2021 — Source; *West Coast Fever were stripped 12 premiership points due to historical salary cap violations.

== Finals Series ==
=== Major Semi Final ===
Sat 14 Aug; 1.00pm	Report; Stats	Giants Netball (1)	61–62	New South Wales Swifts (2)	Nissan Arena; Umpires: Bronwen Adams, Nathan Begley	Nine
Sat 14 Aug; 1.00pm	Report; Stats	Scoring by quarter: 12-20, 16-14, 20-15, 13-13			Nissan Arena; Umpires: Bronwen Adams, Nathan Begley	Nine
Sat 14 Aug; 1.00pm	Report; Stats	Scoring by half: 28-34, 33-28			Nissan Arena; Umpires: Bronwen Adams, Nathan Begley	Nine
Sat 14 Aug; 1.00pm	Report; Stats	2 Goal Shots; Dwyer 5/10 (50%); Harten 3/6 (50%); 1 Goal Shots; Harten 32/34 (94%); Dwyer 13/17 (76%)		2 Goal Shots; Wallace 4/6 (67%); Housby 1/2 (50%); 1 Goal Shots; Wallace 41/42 (98%); Housby 10/11 (91%); Garbin 1/2 (50%)	Nissan Arena; Umpires: Bronwen Adams, Nathan Begley	Nine

=== Minor Semi Final ===
Sat 14 Aug; 3.00pm	Report; Stats	West Coast Fever (3)	75–67	Sunshine Coast Lightning (4)	Nissan Arena; Umpires: Justin Barnes, Kate Wright	Nine
Sat 14 Aug; 3.00pm	Report; Stats	Scoring by quarter: 19-16, 21-17, 14-19, 21-15			Nissan Arena; Umpires: Justin Barnes, Kate Wright	Nine
Sat 14 Aug; 3.00pm	Report; Stats	Scoring by half: 40-33, 35-34			Nissan Arena; Umpires: Justin Barnes, Kate Wright	Nine
Sat 14 Aug; 3.00pm	Report; Stats	2 Goal Shots; Teague-Neeld 4/4 (100%); Glasgow 0/1 (0%); 1 Goal Shots; Fowler 54/55 (98%); Teague-Neeld 7/11 (64%); Glasgow 6/7 (86%)		2 Goal Shots; Wood 6/13 (46%); Koenen 0/2 (0%); 1 Goal Shots; Koenen 33/37 (89%); Wood 22/26 (85%)	Nissan Arena; Umpires: Justin Barnes, Kate Wright	Nine

=== Preliminary Final ===
Sat 21 Aug; 3.00pm	Report; Stats	Giants Netball (1)	64–61	West Coast Fever (3)	USC Stadium; Umpires: Kate Wright, Bronwen Adams	Nine
Sat 21 Aug; 3.00pm	Report; Stats	Scoring by quarter: 16-13, 19-14, 16-14, 13-20			USC Stadium; Umpires: Kate Wright, Bronwen Adams	Nine
Sat 21 Aug; 3.00pm	Report; Stats	Scoring by half: 35-27, 29-34			USC Stadium; Umpires: Kate Wright, Bronwen Adams	Nine
Sat 21 Aug; 3.00pm	Report; Stats	2 Goal Shots; Dwyer 2/2 (100%); Harten 1/5 (20%); 1 Goal Shots; Harten 35/38 (92%); Dwyer 23/26 (88%)		2 Goal Shots; Teague-Neeld 5/10 (50%); Fowler 4/6 (67%); Glasgow 0/2 (0%); 1 Goal Shots; Fowler 37/40 (93%); Teague-Neeld 4/6 (67%); Glasgow 2/2 (100%)	USC Stadium; Umpires: Kate Wright, Bronwen Adams	Nine

=== Grand Final ===
Sat 28 Aug; 2.30pm	Report; Stats	New South Wales Swifts (2)	63–59	Giants Netball (1)	Nissan Arena; Attendance: 3,650; Umpires: Kate Wright, Justin Barnes	Nine
Sat 28 Aug; 2.30pm	Report; Stats	Scoring by quarter: 17-15, 15-13, 17-12, 14-19			Nissan Arena; Attendance: 3,650; Umpires: Kate Wright, Justin Barnes	Nine
Sat 28 Aug; 2.30pm	Report; Stats	Scoring by half: 32-28, 31-31			Nissan Arena; Attendance: 3,650; Umpires: Kate Wright, Justin Barnes	Nine
Sat 28 Aug; 2.30pm	Report; Stats	2 Goal Shots; Wallace 3/5 (60%); Housby 1/1 (100%); 1 Goal Shots; Wallace 48/50 (96%); Housby 6/7 (86%); Garbin 1/1 (100%)		2 Goal Shots; Harten 6/14 (43%); Dwyer 3/8 (38%); 1 Goal Shots; Harten 28/29 (97%); Dwyer 13/14 (93%)	Nissan Arena; Attendance: 3,650; Umpires: Kate Wright, Justin Barnes	Nine
Sat 28 Aug; 2.30pm	Report; Stats	Grand Final MVP: Maddy Turner			Nissan Arena; Attendance: 3,650; Umpires: Kate Wright, Justin Barnes	Nine

== Awards ==
The following players, coaches and umpires were awarded by Netball Australia for performances in the 2021 season:

- The Player of the Year Award was won by Jhaniele Fowler of the West Coast Fever.
- The Grand Final MVP Award was won by Maddy Turner of the New South Wales Swifts.
- The Rising Star Award was won by Sophie Dwyer of GIANTS Netball.
- The Joyce Brown Coach of the Year award was won by Briony Akle of the New South Wales Swifts.
- The Lorna McConchie Umpire of the Year award was won by Andrea Booth of Victoria.
- The Leading Goalscorer Award was won by Jhaniele Fowler of the West Coast Fever, who scored 883 points in the regular season.
- The following players were named in the Super Netball Team of the Year:

Attackers

- Goal Shooter: Jhaniele Fowler
  (West Coast Fever)
- Goal Attack: Jo Harten
  (Giants Netball)

Midcourters

- Wing Attack: Maddie Hay
  (Giants Netball)
- Centre: Kim Ravaillion
  (Queensland Firebirds)
- Wing Defence: Gabi Simpson
  (Queensland Firebirds)

Defenders

- Goal Defence: Sunday Aryang
  (West Coast Fever)
- Goal Keeper: Courtney Bruce
  (West Coast Fever)

Reserves

- Attack Reserve: Samantha Wallace
  (New South Wales Swifts)
- Midcourt Reserve: Jamie-Lee Price
  (Giants Netball)
- Defence Reserve: Shamera Sterling
  (Adelaide Thunderbirds)
