= Nathan Charles =

- Born: Nathan Charles; 9 January 1989 (age 37) Baulkham Hills, Sydney, Australia
- Height: 1.83 m (6 ft 0 in)
- Weight: 104 kg (16.4 st; 229 lb)
- School: Knox Grammar School
- University: Sydney University

Rugby union career
- Position: Hooker
Senior career
| Years | Team | Apps | (Points) |
| 2011 | Gloucester | 3 | (0) |
| 2014 | Perth Spirit | 0 | (0) |
| 2016 | Greater Sydney Rams | 2 | (0) |
| 2016 | Clermont | 4 | (0) |
| 2017 | Bath | 10 | (5) |
| 2017 | Wasps | 2 | (0) |
- Correct as of 1 May 2018
Super Rugby
| Years | Team | Apps | (Points) |
| 2010–16 | Force | 83 | (20) |
| 2018 | Rebels | 2 | (0) |
- Correct as of 14 July 2018
International career
| Years | Team | Apps | (Points) |
| 2014–15 | Australia | 4 | (0) |
| 2008–09 | Junior Wallabies | 7 | (5) |
- Correct as of 1 May 2018

Nathan Charles (born 9 January 1989) is a former Australian rugby union player and now sports administrator. He played hooker for the Western Force in the Super Rugby competition, having previously played for the Melbourne Rebels, Sydney University in the Shute Shield & Western Sydney Rams in the NRC. He signed with English club Gloucester RFC in August 2011, but played there for only part of the 2011–12 northern hemisphere season before returning to Australia to continue his spell with the Force and pursue his dream to play for the Wallabies.

== Career ==
Nathan began playing rugby at the Wahroonga Tigers Rugby Club in Sydney, where he played over 200 games and gained junior representative honours for Gordon, Metropolitan North & Sydney Juniors. Nathan attended proud rugby school, Knox Grammar, also in Sydney, where he went on to represent CAS, NSW Schoolboys & Australian Schoolboys.

During his final two years of schooling (2005–06), Nathan played for Knox Grammar School in Sydney on the Saturday, and the Canterbury SG Ball team on either the Friday or Sunday.

Charles signed a Bulldogs contract, but had an agreement that if he made the Australian Schoolboys team, he could get out of the deal. Selection in the 2006 Schoolboys line-up ensured he was Super rugby, rather than NRL, bound.

He played for the ACT Brumbies in 2008–10, also making the Australian under-20 team through his successful exploits as the starting hooker at Sydney University.

Charles' first Super 14 game was for the Western Force in 2010. His debut was in the eighth round against the touring South Africa side, The Stormers.

In October 2010 at 21 years of age, Nathan Charles was selected to the Qantas Wallabies Training Squad for the 2010 Spring Tour. However, he made no appearances on that tour. His next opportunity for his first cap came in June 2014 for the Wallabies' second Test against France; Charles was named to the bench following a knee injury to Stephen Moore.

He is believed to be the only person in the world with cystic fibrosis to play any contact sport professionally. After naming Charles to the substitutes' bench for the aforementioned France Test, Wallabies head coach Ewen McKenzie said, "If you look at the symptoms and classic outcomes of cystic fibrosis it's not a great scenario from a sporting point of view, but he seems to have defied science and defied logic."

In 2016 Charles made a move to France for ASM Clermont Auvergne as medical cover in the year that Clermont won their first top 14 title. Following this stint Charles was signed by Bath Rugby another European powerhouse. Charles went on to represent Bath for 18 months before retiring in 2018.

== Super Rugby statistics ==
As of 15 July 2018

| Season | Team | Games | Starts | Sub | Mins | Tries | Cons | Pens | Drops | Points | Yel | Red |
|---|---|---|---|---|---|---|---|---|---|---|---|---|
| 2010 | Force | 7 | 2 | 5 | 213 | 0 | 0 | 0 | 0 | 0 | 0 | 0 |
| 2011 | Force | 16 | 8 | 8 | 819 | 1 | 0 | 0 | 0 | 5 | 0 | 0 |
| 2012 | Force | 16 | 16 | 0 | 1216 | 0 | 0 | 0 | 0 | 0 | 0 | 0 |
| 2013 | Force | 5 | 5 | 0 | 328 | 0 | 0 | 0 | 0 | 0 | 0 | 0 |
| 2014 | Force | 16 | 16 | 0 | 1101 | 3 | 0 | 0 | 0 | 15 | 0 | 0 |
| 2015 | Force | 16 | 16 | 0 | 972 | 0 | 0 | 0 | 0 | 0 | 0 | 0 |
| 2016 | Force | 7 | 3 | 4 | 266 | 0 | 0 | 0 | 0 | 0 | 0 | 0 |
| 2018 | Rebels | 2 | 0 | 2 | 26 | 0 | 0 | 0 | 0 | 0 | 0 | 0 |
| Total | | 85 | 66 | 19 | 4941 | 4 | 0 | 0 | 0 | 20 | 1 | 0 |

== Personal life ==
Married West Coast Fever netball player Verity Charles (née Simmons) in December 2016. Now divorced.

Charles was diagnosed with Motor Neuron Disease in 2026, at the age of 37.
