= Super Netball Leading Goalscorer Award =

Australian sports award

The Super Netball Leading Goalscorer Award is an annual Super Netball award given to the player that scores the most points in the Super Netball home and away season (i.e. not including finals). This award includes both 1-point goals and 2-point super shots.

The current holder of the award is Elmeré van der Berg who won the award in her debut season.

== Winners ==
Season	Player	Nationality	Team	Points	Ref.
2017	Caitlin Thwaites	Australia	Collingwood Magpies	594	
2018	Jhaniele Fowler	Jamaica	West Coast Fever	783	
2019	Jhaniele Fowler (2)	Jamaica	West Coast Fever	709	
2020	Jhaniele Fowler (3)	Jamaica	West Coast Fever	795	
2021	Jhaniele Fowler (4)	Jamaica	West Coast Fever	883	
2022	Jhaniele Fowler (5)	Jamaica	West Coast Fever	929	
2023	Jhaniele Fowler (6)	Jamaica	West Coast Fever	768	
2024	Jhaniele Fowler-Nembhard (7)	Jamaica	West Coast Fever	813	
2025	Jhaniele Fowler-Nembhard (8)	Jamaica	West Coast Fever	724	
2026	Elmeré van der Berg	South Africa	Adelaide Thunderbirds	748	
