= Super Netball Rookie of the Year Award =

Australian netball award

The Super Netball Rookie of the Year Award, previously known as the Super Netball Young Star Award and colloquially as the Rising Star, is an annual Super Netball award in Australia.

It is an award recognising the outstanding on-court achievements of a Super Netball athlete. Previously to 2022, to be eligible for the award the netballer had to be aged under 23 years at the beginning of the season. However, the award was modified to remove the age criterion and instead acknowledge any player who has played at least five games in their first year in the league.

== Winners ==
Season	Player	Nationality	Team	Ref.
2017	Liz Watson	Australia	Melbourne Vixens	
2018	Jess Anstiss	Australia	West Coast Fever	
2019	Amy Parmenter	Australia	GIANTS Netball	
2020	Maisie Nankivell	Australia	Adelaide Thunderbirds	
2021	Sophie Dwyer	Australia	GIANTS Netball	
2022	Donnell Wallam	Australia	Queensland Firebirds	
2023	Lucy Austin	Australia	Adelaide Thunderbirds	
2024	Lauren Frew	Australia	Adelaide Thunderbirds	
2025	Sophie Casey	Australia	Adelaide Thunderbirds	
2026	Ruth Aryang	Australia	West Coast Fever	
