= Ingrid Colyer =

Australian netball player

Personal information
- Born: 27 October 1993 (age 32) Karridale, Western Australia
- Height: 1.65 m (5 ft 5 in)

Netball career
- Playing positions: WA, C
Years	Club team	Apps
2014–	West Coast Fever	

Ingrid Colyer (born 27 October 1993) is an Australian netball player in the Suncorp Super Netball league, playing for the West Coast Fever.

Colyer grew up on a farm in Karridale, a small township in the south-west of Western Australia. Colyer made her debut for the Fever in 2013, filling in as a temporary replacement player at the club for the injured Ashleigh Brazill. She established herself as a key mid-court player at the club over the next few years, which culminated a career-best season in 2018. At just 165 cm, Colyer is the second-shortest player in the Super Netball league, 32 cm shorter than her two tallest teammates.
