= Verity Simmons =

Australian netball player

- Netball career
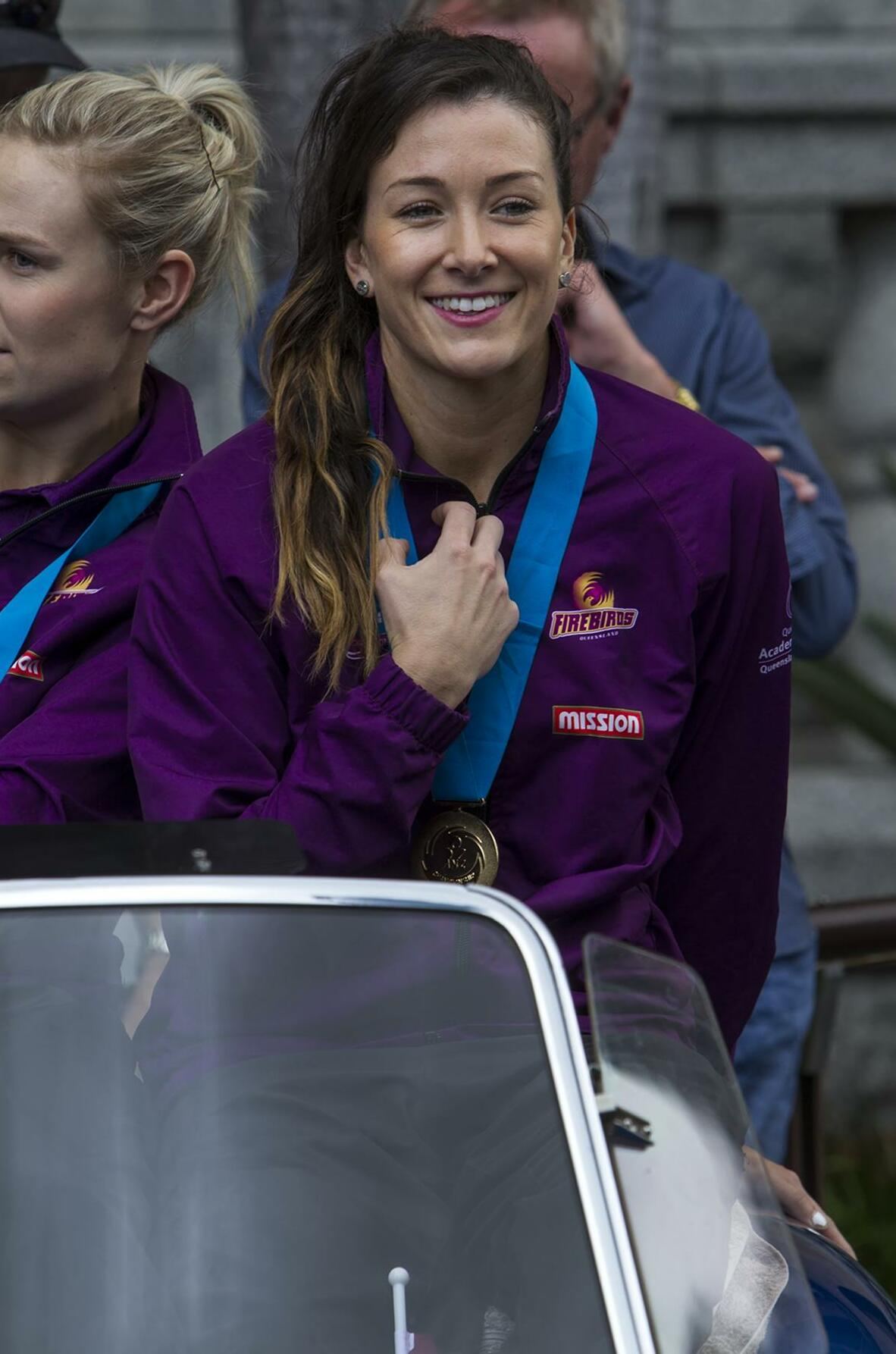
- Simmons in 2015
- Full name: Verity Anne Simmons
- Born: 19 May 1991 (age 35) Grafton, New South Wales, Australia
- Height: 1.70 m (5 ft 7 in)
- School: Grafton High School; McAuley Catholic College
- Playing position: WA/C
Years	Club team	Apps
2012–2013	West Coast Fever	20
2014–2015	Queensland Firebirds	19
2016–2023	West Coast Fever	120
2025	NSW Swifts	15
2026	West Coast Fever	1
Years	National team	Caps
2021	Australia	3
- Updated on 20:33, 20 December 2023 (UTC)
Australian rules football career
Playing career^{1}
Years	Club	Games (Goals)
2024	West Coast	7 (1)
- ^{1} Playing statistics correct to the end of the 2024 season.

Verity Anne Simmons (formerly Charles, born 19 May 1991) is an Australian rules footballer and former netball player. She currently plays for West Coast in the AFL Women's (AFLW). Verity was delisted at the end of the 2024 season and recruited by the NSW Swifts for the 2025 season of Suncorp Super Netball. In netball, she played 159 national league games for the West Coast Fever and Queensland Firebirds between 2012 and 2023. She also earnt three caps for the Australian national team.

== Netball ==
In 2012, Simmons played her first season in the ANZ Championship with West Coast Fever. In 2014, she transferred to the Queensland Firebirds, where was part of a team that made a grand final in 2014 and won a premiership in 2015. In 2016, she transferred back to the Fever. She was appointed vice-captain for the inaugural season of Suncorp Super Netball in 2017, and won a premiership with the Fever in 2022.

In 2021, she played three games for the Australian national team.

At the end of the 2023 Super Netball season, after 159 national league games, she announced her "shock" retirement from the sport.

== Football ==
Ahead of the 2024 AFL Women's season, Simmons signed a rookie contract with West Coast.

== Other ventures and personal life ==
In 2019, Simmons was a contestant on the third season of the television series Australian Ninja Warrior.

From 2016 to 2022, she was married to former Wallaby Nathan Charles. During their marriage, she was known as Verity Charles.
