= Collingwood Magpies (netball) =

Australian netball team

- Founded: 2016
- Disbanded: 2023
- Based in: Melbourne
- Regions: Victoria
- Home venue: John Cain Arena (10,500); Silverdome (4,000)
- Head coach: Nicole Richardson
- Co-captains: Ash Brazill, Geva Mentor
- Vice-captain: Kelsey Browne
- League: Super Netball
- 2023 placing: 8th (last)
Uniform

The Collingwood Magpies were an Australian professional netball team in Melbourne that competed in the premier domestic league, Super Netball. The team was founded in 2016, during the disbanding of the ANZ Championship. The Magpies were owned by the professional Australian Football League entity, the Collingwood Football Club. The team's home games were predominantly played at John Cain Arena. In May 2023, news reports disclosed that the team was in financial distress, and later that month the Collingwood Football Club announced it would withdraw its netball team at the conclusion of the 2023 season.

== History ==
Following the dissolution of the trans-Tasman ANZ Championship competition in 2016, Netball Australia announced the creation of a new national netball league, which would feature the five original Australian teams and three additional teams. In May 2016, Netball Australia confirmed that the Collingwood Football Club was one of three preferred license holders for the new teams.

Collingwood Magpies Netball was launched in September 2016 at the headquarters of the Collingwood Football Club, the Melbourne Sports and Entertainment Centre. The new team had a distinct logo, different from the football team, though a few years later the club elected to unify the logo with the football team. Speaking at the launch, club president Eddie McGuire stated, "This team is not an add on to our [football] program by any stretch. It has its own identity, its own high performance unit in its own right and our strategy is to get the best people and best players possible."

=== 2017–20: Early years ===
The Magpies debuted in the 2017 Super Netball season. For the inaugural season, Madi Browne was appointed team captain under head coach Kristy Keppich-Birrell. The Magpies entered the league with a star-studded squad of former and existing Australia national team players, thanks mainly due to significant financial weight backing the team. Consequently, the Magpies were widely tipped by pundits to win the league. However, the team finished the regular season fourth (out of eight teams) on the ladder and lost their elimination final to Giants Netball by one goal. In the following season the Magpies struggled for wins and consistency. Prominent defender Sharni Layton announced her retirement and the club elected not to extend the contract of coach Kristy Keppich-Birrell, replacing her with former Swifts coach Rob Wright at the end of the season. Wright oversaw the signing of new players Kelsey Browne and Geva Mentor among others, and the Magpies returned to finals, though were defeated by local rivals the Vixens in the elimination final. The following year the Magpies won only one of their fourteen games in the COVID-19-impacted season. Co-captain Madi Browne departed from the club and Rob Wright's tenure as coach ended. Wright was replaced by former Diamond and Magpies assistant Nicole Richardson as the new head coach.

=== 2023: Financial distress and notice of withdrawal ===
Facing just three finals appearances from seven years in the league, the club's performance both financially and on the court came under intense scrutiny during the month of May, culminating in the club's announcement to fold the netball team. Netball Australia promptly announced it would be negotiating with interested parties for the eighth licence for a 2024–26 window.

Collingwood CEO Craig Kelly blamed financial difficulties faced by Netball Australia and the lack of a league-wide collective player agreement and team participation agreement for the 2024 season as the reasons for the withdrawal. The club played its final match on 17 June 2023 at the Silverdome in Launceston, and defeated the league's reigning premiers West Coast Fever by three goals in a game that doubled as the final domestic appearance for club stalwart Ashleigh Brazill.

== Franchise ==
=== Venues ===
The Magpies' primary home court was the 10,500-capacity John Cain Arena. The club also played one or two home games a year at the Silverdome in Launceston as part of an agreement with the government of Tasmania. Throughout its time in the league, the Magpies also played some home matches at Margaret Court Arena and Bendigo Stadium.

=== List of captains ===
Collingwood's inaugural captain was Madison Browne, who led the team to a finals place in the inaugural season. The club became the first in the league's history to appoint co-captains, when English international Geva Mentor was appointed alongside Browne in 2019.

- Madison Browne (2017–2020)
- Geva Mentor (2019–2023)
- Ashleigh Brazill (2022–2023)

== Final roster ==
2023 Collingwood Magpies roster
Players
Coaching staff

Nat.	Name	Position(s)	DoB	Height
(Australia)	Ashleigh Brazill (cc)	C, WD	29 December 1989	1.75 m (5 ft 9 in)
(Australia)	Kelsey Browne (vc)	WA, C	17 January 1992	1.64 m (5 ft 5 in)
(Australia)	Sophie Garbin	GS, GA	6 April 1997	1.84 m (6 ft 0 in)
(Australia)	Molly Jovic	WA, C, WD	7 October 1995	1.72 m (5 ft 8 in)
(Australia)	Maddie Hinchliffe	WD, C	25 May 1998	1.81 m (5 ft 11 in)
(England)	Geva Mentor (cc)	GK	17 September 1984	1.90 m (6 ft 3 in)
(Jamaica)	Shimona Nelson	GS	1 December 1998	1.95 m (6 ft 5 in)
(Australia)	Jacqui Newton	GD, GK, WD	14 February 1997	1.85 m (6 ft 1 in)
(Australia)	Nyah Allen (injured)	GA, GS	7 March 2002	1.83 m (6 ft 0 in)
(Jamaica)	Jodi-Ann Ward	GD, WD, GK	1 September 1994	1.75 m (5 ft 9 in)
(Australia)	Kelly Singleton (TRP)	GA, GS	24 June 1998	1.8 m (5 ft 11 in)

Head coach

- Nicole Richardson

Assistant coach

- Kate Upton

Notes

- (c) – Captain
- (cc) – Co-captain
- (vc) – Vice-captain
- – Injury / maternity leave
- (TRP) – Temporary Replacement Player
Player profiles: Team website
Last updated: 17 March 2023

== Competitive record ==
Season	Standings	Regular season			Finals	Head coach
Season	Standings	W	D	L	Finals	Head coach
Collingwood Magpies
2017	4th	9	0	5	Lost Elimination Final (Giants, 51–52)	Kristy Keppich-Birrell
2018	7th	3	1	10	DNQ	Kristy Keppich-Birrell
2019	4th	7	2	5	Lost Elimination Final (Vixens, 49–62)	Rob Wright
2020	8th	1	0	13	DNQ	Rob Wright
2021	6th	6	0	8	DNQ	Nicole Richardson
2022	4th	6	0	8	Lost Elimination Final (Giants, 48–55)	Nicole Richardson
2023	8th	4	0	10	DNQ	Nicole Richardson
Regular season		36	3	59	0 Minor Premierships	
Finals		0	0	3	0 Super Netball titles	

== Reserve team ==
For the majority of the Collingwood Magpies' existence, the Tasmanian Magpies acted as its reserve team, holding an affiliation with the club from 2017 to 2020. The Tasmanian Magpies played in the Australian Netball League (ANL), the national second-tier netball competition, and were champions in 2018. Following the collapse of the ANL due to cancellations caused by the COVID-19 pandemic, Collingwood announced it would field its own reserves team, also known as the Collingwood Magpies, in the new Australian Netball Championships, which were first held in Traralgon in August 2022.

== Honours ==
=== Club achievements ===
- Premierships (0): Nil
- Minor Premierships (0): Nil
- Pre-Season Premierships (1): 2019
- Australian Netball Championships (2): 2018, (Note: Playing as the Tasmanian Magpies in 2018) 2023
- Netball New Zealand Super Club Titles (1): 2019

=== Best and fairest awards ===
Player	Year(s) won	Years active	Ref
Kelsey Browne	2022	2015–present	
Ash Brazill	2018	2010–2023	
Geva Mentor	2019, 2020	2005–present	
Caitlin Thwaites	2017	2002–2020	
Jodi-Ann Ward	2021, 2023	2015–present	
