= Ashleigh Brazill =

Australian netball and football player

- Born: 29 December 1989 (age 36); Campbelltown, New South Wales
- Occupation: Athlete
- Netball career
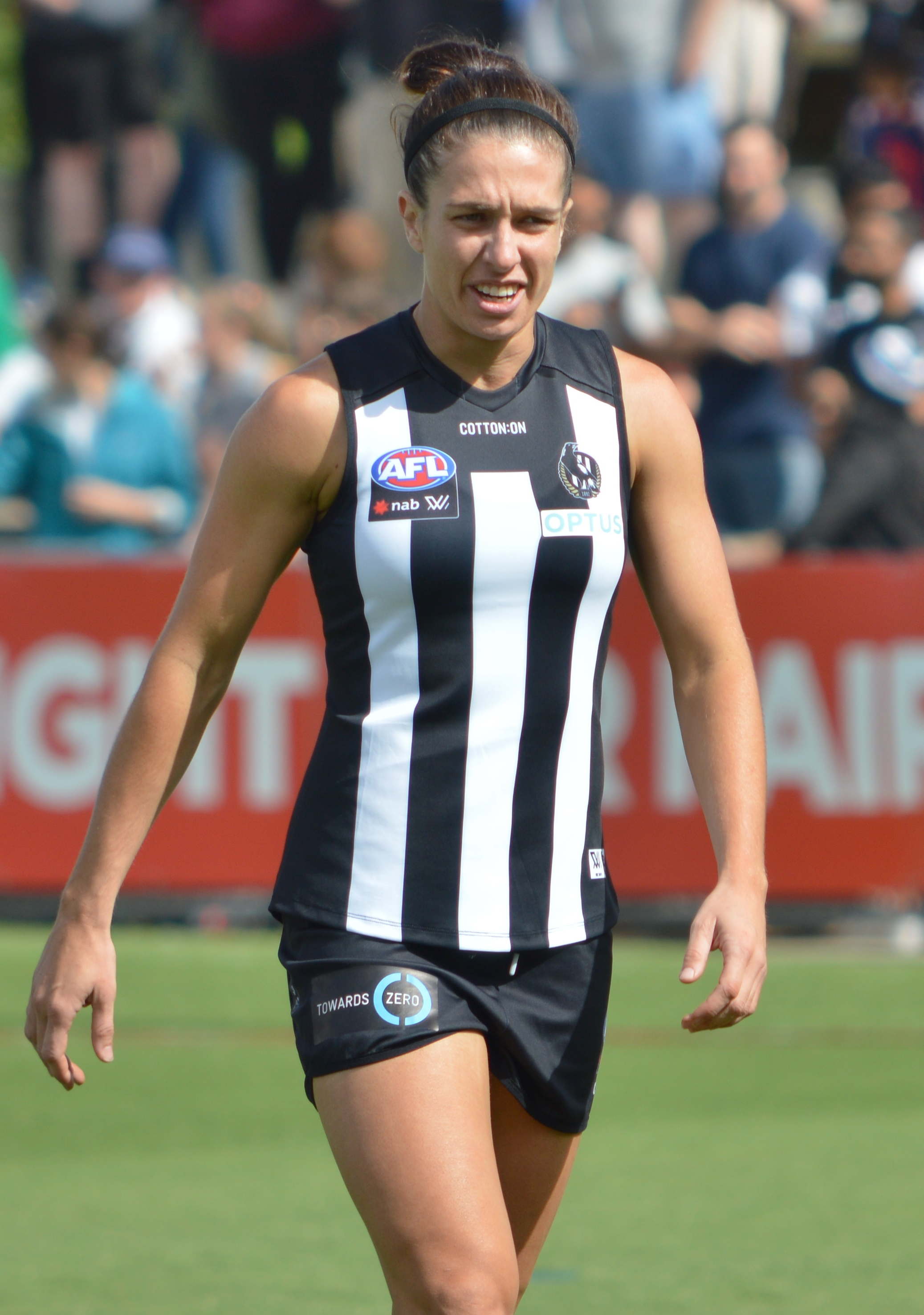
- Height: 1.75 m (5 ft 9 in)
- Spouse: Brooke Brazill
- School: Bargo Public School & Picton High School (NSW)
- Playing positions: C, WD, Utility
Years	Club team	Apps
2010–2011	New South Wales Swifts	
2012–2016	West Coast Fever	
2017–2022	Collingwood Magpies	
Years	National team	Caps
2015–2016, 2019–2023	Australia	
Medal record
Representing Australia
Netball World Cup
Gold medal – first place	2023 Cape Town	Team
Commonwealth Games
Gold medal – first place	2022 Birmingham	Netball
World Netball Series
Bronze medal – third place	2011 Liverpool	Fastnet
Australian rules football career
Personal information
- Draft: No. 35, 2017 national draft
- Debut: Round 6, 2018, Collingwood vs. Brisbane
- Position: defender
Club information
- Current club: Fremantle
- Number: 24
Playing career^{1}
Years	Club	Games (Goals)
2018–2023	Collingwood	32 (5)
2024–	Fremantle	33 (1)
Total		65 (6)
- ^{1} Playing statistics correct to the end of the 2026 season.

Ashleigh Brazill (born 29 December 1989 in Campbelltown, New South Wales) is an Australian rules footballer who plays for the Fremantle Football Club in the AFL Women's. She previously played netball for the Collingwood Magpies, and Australian rules football for the Collingwood Football Club, playing both sports concurrently. She also played for the West Coast Fever, New South Wales Swifts and the Australia national team during her netball career.

== Netball career ==
=== Domestic ===
Brazill made her domestic league debut for the New South Wales Swifts in 2010. She made the move to the West Coast Fever in 2012 and made an immediate impact, winning the club's MVP for the season. Brazill suffered with injuries over the next two seasons which restricted her time on court. Despite sitting out most of the 2014 ANZ Championship season Brazill captained Western Sting, leading the Fevers' reserves team to a bronze medal in the second-tier Australian Netball League (ANL). She was also named joint Player of the Year in the 2014 Australian Netball League. She was selected as captain of the Fever for the 2015 and 2016 seasons.

She signed with the Collingwood Magpies ahead of the 2017 Suncorp Super Netball season. Brazill has been hugely influential in wing-defence for the Magpies and her good form was rewarded with the club best and fairest award for the 2018 season.

=== International ===
In 2010, Brazill was one of the twelve players selected for the Australian Fast5 team. She took part in the 2011 World Netball Series in Liverpool and was Australia's best player for the series. She represented Australia again in the Fast5 series in 2013 and 2014. On 25 October 2015, Brazill made her senior debut for Australia in the third test of the 2015 Constellation Cup series against New Zealand. She was also a late replacement for Renae Ingles in the January 2016 tour of England. Brazill has also previously won gold medals at both the Commonwealth Games and the Netball World Cup in 2022 and 2023 respectively.

== Australian rules football career ==
On 18 October 2017, she was drafted to play for Collingwood in the 2018 AFL Women's season after being selected at pick 34.

Collingwood re-signed Brazill and appointed her vice-captain for the 2019 season. Brazill had a breakout season at the club and was named in the All-Australian team at the end of the season.

In December 2023, following her request to return to Western Australia with her family, Brazill was traded to Fremantle in exchange for Mikayla Hyde, with picks being traded too as part of a massive 11-club trade. Upon joining Fremantle, Brazill was elevated to the club's leadership group.

In September 2026, Brazill announced that she would be retiring at the end of the 2026 AFL Women's season.

== Personal life ==
Brazill married her long-term partner Brooke Grieves on 30 January 2016 in Western Australia. At the time same-sex marriage was not legal in Australia. The couple celebrated the birth of their son Louis in January 2020.

== Statistics ==
=== AFLW statistics ===
Statistics are correct to the end of the 2023 season.

Legend
G	Goals	K	Kicks	D	Disposals	T	Tackles
B	Behinds	H	Handballs	M	Marks

Indicators for exceptional statistics
Led the league for the season only
Led the league after the Grand Final only
Led the league after season and Grand Final

Ashleigh Brazill AFLW statistics
Season	Team	No.	Games	Totals							Averages (per game)							Votes
Season	Team	No.	Games	G	B	K	H	D	M	T	G	B	K	H	D	M	T	Votes
2018	Collingwood	10	2	0	0	15	7	22	5	5	0.0	0.0	7.5	3.5	11.0	2.5	2.5	0
2019	Collingwood	10	6	0	0	93	14	107	20	14	0.0	0.0	15.5	2.3	17.8	3.3	2.3	3
2020	Collingwood	10	4	0	0	29	24	53	10	6	0.0	0.0	7.3	6.0	13.3	2.5	1.5	0
2021	Collingwood	10	4	1	4	35	10	45	14	11	0.3	1.0	8.8	2.4	11.3	3.5	2.8	0
2022 (S6)	Collingwood	10	0	—	—	—	—	—	—	—	—	—	—	—	—	—	—	—
2022 (S7)	Collingwood	10	8	2	9	54	42	96	22	19	0.3	1.1	6.8	5.3	12.0	2.8	2.4	0
2023	Collingwood	10	8	2	4	42	15	57	10	7	0.3	0.5	5.3	1.9	7.1	1.3	0.9	
Career			32	5	17	268	112	380	81	62	0.2	0.5	8.4	3.5	11.9	2.5	1.9	3

==== Netball statistics ====
Statistics are correct to the end of the 2022 season.

Season	Team	G/A	GA	RB	CPR	FD	IC	DF	PN	TO	MP
2017	Magpies	0/0	4	0	74	11	28	43	148	13	15
2018	Magpies	0/0	5	1	138	5	33	46	110	28	14
2019	Magpies	0/0	84	0	61	120	18	68	116	34	15
2021	Magpies	0/0	49	0	91	82	15	45	112	51	12
2022	Magpies	0/0	20	0	129	30	11	32	141	32	13
Career		0/0	162	1	493	248	105	234	627	158	69
