= West Coast Fever =

Australian netball team

- Founded: 2008
- Based in: Perth
- Regions: Western Australia
- Home venue: RAC Arena
- Head coach: Dan Ryan
- Asst coach: Sharni Layton
- Captain: TBA
- Premierships: 1 (2022)
- League: Super Netball; ANZ Championship (2008–2016)
- 2026 placing: 3rd
- Website: westcoastfever.com.au
Playing dress

West Coast Fever is a professional Australian netball team based in Perth, Western Australia. Since 2017 they have played in the Suncorp Super Netball competition. Between 2008 and 2016, they competed in the ANZ Championship. Between 1997 and 2007, as the Perth Orioles, they competed in the Commonwealth Bank Trophy league.

During the ANZ Championship era, the Fever were the only Australian team not to win a title, play in a grand final or feature in a finals series. However, during the Super Netball era they emerged as challengers. They were grand finalists in both 2018 and 2020, and eventually claimed their first premiership in 2022. They also made the grand final in 2025 after winning the minor premiership for the first time in club history.

== History ==
=== ANZ Championship (2008-2016) ===
Between 2008 and 2016, West Coast Fever played in the ANZ Championship. Fever's best performance in the ANZ Championship came in 2015 when they won nine games and finished third in the Australian Conference.

Regular season statistics
Season	Position	Won	Drawn	Lost
2008	9th	2	1	10
2009	7th	5	0	8
2010	8th	4	0	9
2011	9th	3	0	10
2012	8th	3	0	10
2013	7th	5	0	8
2014	9th	4	0	9
2015	3rd	9	1	3
2016	4th	7	0	6

=== Super Netball era (2017-present) ===
==== Challengers ====
Since 2017, West Coast Fever have played in Super Netball. In 2018, Fever reached their first ever grand final. The team was coached by Stacey Marinkovich and captained by Courtney Bruce. During the regular season they finished second. Jhaniele Fowler finished the season as both Player of the Year and Leading Goalscorer while Jessica Anstiss was named young player of the year. In the grand final, Fever lost 62–59 to Sunshine Coast Lightning. Fever were again grand finalists and runners–up in 2020, losing to Melbourne Vixens by two goals.

==== Salary cap breach ====
In December 2020 Fever were fined $300,000, of which $150,000 was suspended, and stripped 12 premiership points for the 2021 season, after they were found to have breached the salary cap in the 2018 and 2019 seasons. The penalties amounted to the biggest in Australian netball history, with a Netball Australia investigation determining the Fever made payments of more than $127,000 above the salary cap in 2018, and more than $168,000 above the cap in 2019.

==== First premiership ====
In 2022, head coach Dan Ryan and captain Courtney Bruce led West Coast Fever to their first premiership. In the grand final they defeated Melbourne Vixens 70-59.

Regular season statistics
Season	Position	Won	Drawn	Lost
2017	7th	2	0	12
2018	2nd	10	0	4
2019	6th	2	3	9
2020	2nd	8	1	5
2021	3rd	11	0	3
2022	2nd	10	0	4
2023	3rd	9	0	5
2024	3rd	11	0	3
2025	1st	12	0	2
2026	3rd	9	0	5

Premierships
Runners Up

== Grand finals ==
Season	Winners	Score	Runners up	Venue
2018	Sunshine Coast Lightning	62–59	West Coast Fever	Perth Arena
2020	Melbourne Vixens	66–64	West Coast Fever	Nissan Arena
2022	West Coast Fever	70–59	Melbourne Vixens	RAC Arena
2025	Melbourne Vixens	59–58	West Coast Fever	Rod Laver Arena

== Home venues ==
As of 2019, the West Coast Fever play all of their home games at RAC Arena. The venue was first used for a Fever game in 2013, and occasional matches were played at the venue over the following few years. It was the main home venue for the 2017 and 2018 seasons, sharing with HBF Stadium, which had served as the club's main home venue since 2008. RAC Arena has hosted 2 grand finals (2018 and 2022), and the venue consistently draws the highest average attendance every season.

The club's administrative and training base is located at the Gold Netball Centre in Jolimont, which also serves as the office for Netball WA.

== Notable players ==
=== 2027 squad ===
2027 West Coast Fever roster
Players
Coaching staff

Nat.	Name	Position(s)	DoB	Height
(Australia)	Ruth Aryang	GK, GD	14 January 2004 (age 22)	1.84 m (6 ft 0 in)
(Australia)	Sunday Aryang	GD, WD	25 December 2000 (age 25)	1.84 m (6 ft 0 in)
(Jamaica)	Shanice Beckford	GA,GS	16 April 1995 (age 31)	1.75 m (5 ft 9 in)
(Australia)	Zoe Cransberg	C, WD, WA	16 November 1999 (age 26)	1.78 m (5 ft 10 in)
(Jamaica)	Kadie-Ann Dehaney	GK, GD	4 September 1996 (age 30)	1.92 m (6 ft 4 in)
(New Zealand)	Ameliaranne Ekenasio	GS, GA	11 January 1991 (age 35)	1.86 m (6 ft 1 in)
(Jamaica)	Jhaniele Fowler-Nembhard	GS	21 July 1989 (age 37)	1.98 m (6 ft 6 in)
(New Zealand)	Maddy Gordon	C, WA, WD	16 January 2000 (age 26)	1.74 m (5 ft 9 in)
(Australia)	Alice Teague-Neeld	WA, GA	2 March 1996 (age 30)	1.81 m (5 ft 11 in)
(England)	Fran Williams	GD, GK	23 December 1997 (age 28)	1.84 m (6 ft 0 in)

Head coach

- (Australia) Dan Ryan

Assistant coach

- (Australia) Sharni Layton

Notes

- (c) – Captain
- (cc) – Co-captain
- (vc) – Vice-captain
- – Injury / maternity leave
- (TRP) – Temporary Replacement Player
Player profiles: Team website
Last updated: 23 October 2026

=== Internationals ===
Australia

Diamonds
- Sunday Aryang
- Caitlin Bassett
- Kate Beveridge
- April Brandley
- Ashleigh Brazill
- Kelsey Browne
- Madison Browne
- Courtney Bruce
- Catherine Cox
- Rudi Ellis
- Susan Fuhrmann
- Natalie Medhurst
- Chelsea Pitman
- Verity Simmons
- Alice Teague-Neeld
Kelpies
- Daniel Cools (WCF training partner)
- Jerome Gillbard (WCF training partner)
- Dravyn Lee-Tauroa (WCF training partner)
- Dylan McPherson (WCF training partner)
- Dan Ryan (WCF head coach)

England

- Ama Agbeze
- Karen Atkinson
- Stacey Francis-Bayman
- Sasha Glasgow
- Chelsea Pitman
- Eboni Usoro-Brown
- Fran Williams

Jamaica

- Romelda Aiken-George
- Shanice Beckford
- Kadie-Ann Dehaney
- Jhaniele Fowler-Nembhard

New Zealand

- Ameliaranne Ekenasio
- Maddy Gordon
- Erena Mikaere
- Larrissa Willcox

=== Captains ===
Name	Years
Stacey Rosman	2008 (sole captain); 2009 (co-captain)
Johannah Curran	2009 (co-captain); 2010–2011 (sole captain)
Catherine Cox	2012–2013
Natalie Medhurst	2014
Ashleigh Brazill	2015–2016
Natalie Medhurst	2017
Courtney Bruce	2018–2023
Jess Anstiss	2024-2026

== Club Award winners ==
Stacey Marinkovich Medal

The Stacey Marinkovich Medal is awarded to the club's MVP. After previously being known as the Most Valuable Player, it was renamed after Stacey Marinkovich (née Rosman) in 2021 to recognise her service to the club as a former club captain and head coach. Marinkovich played over 90 games for the Perth Orioles/West Coast Fever from 2002 until her retirement in 2009, with the final four seasons of her career being captain. Upon her retirement, Marinkovich moved into a coaching role with the Fever, first as an assistant coach in 2012 and 2013 under Norma Plummer, and then taking over as head coach for 8 seasons, 105 games and two grand finals.

The medal is awarded based on 3,2,1 votes given by both the head coach and assistant coach for each home-and-away season game.

ANZ Championship era
Season	Winner
2008	Larrissa Willcox
2009	Madison Browne
2010	Madison Browne (2)
2011	Caitlin Bassett
2012	Ashleigh Brazill
2013	Eboni Beckford-Chambers
2014	Eboni Beckford-Chambers (2)
2015	Natalie Medhurst
2016	Natalie Medhurst (2)

Suncorp Super Netball era
Season	Winner (votes)	Runner-up (votes)	Third place (votes)
2017	Jess Anstiss (52)	Courtney Bruce (41)	Verity Charles (37)
2018	Courtney Bruce (35)	Jhaniele Fowler (34)	Jess Anstiss (32)
2019	Jhaniele Fowler	Courtney Bruce	Ingrid Colyer
2020	Jhaniele Fowler (60) (2)	Courtney Bruce (39)	Verity Charles (22)
2021	Jhaniele Fowler (55) (3)	Courtney Bruce (35)	Sunday Aryang (21)
2022	Jhaniele Fowler (58) (4)	Alice Teague-Neeld (37)	Courtney Bruce (36)
2023	Jhaniele Fowler (38) (5)	Courtney Bruce (35)	Jess Anstiss (25); Sunday Aryang (25)
2024	Jhaniele Fowler-Nembhard (43) (6)	Sunday Aryang (29)	Alice Teague-Neeld (28)
2025	Jhaniele Fowler-Nembhard (43) (7)	Sunday Aryang (38)	Alice Teague-Neeld (27)
2026	Fran Williams (41)	Romelda Aiken-George (30)	Kadie-Ann Dehaney (28)

== Competition Award winners ==
Super Netball Player of the Year

Season	Player
2018	Jhaniele Fowler
2019	Jhaniele Fowler
2020	Jhaniele Fowler
2021	Jhaniele Fowler
2022	Jhaniele Fowler
2025	Jhaniele Fowler-Nembhard

Super Netball Rookie of the Year

Season	Player
2018	Jess Anstiss
2026	Ruth Aryang

Super Netball Leading Goalscorer Award

Season	Player
2018	Jhaniele Fowler
2019	Jhaniele Fowler
2020	Jhaniele Fowler
2021	Jhaniele Fowler
2022	Jhaniele Fowler
2023	Jhaniele Fowler
2024	Jhaniele Fowler-Nembhard
2025	Jhaniele Fowler-Nembhard

Super Netball Grand Final MVP

Season	Player
2022	Sasha Glasgow

ANZ Championship All Star Team

Season	Player	Position
2015	Caitlin Bassett	GS
2015	Stacey Rosman	Coach

Super Netball Team of the Year

Season	Player	Position
2018	Jhaniele Fowler	GS
2018	Jess Anstiss	WD
2019	Jhaniele Fowler	GS
2020	Jhaniele Fowler	GS
2021	Jhaniele Fowler	GS
2021	Sunday Aryang	GD
2021	Courtney Bruce	GK
2022	Jhaniele Fowler	GS
2022	Courtney Bruce	Reserve
2023	Courtney Bruce	Reserve
2024	Jhaniele Fowler-Nembhard	GS
2024	Sunday Aryang	GD
2025	Jhaniele Fowler-Nembhard	GS
2025	Alice Teague-Neeld	WA
2025	Sunday Aryang	Reserve
2026	Fran Williams	GD

== Head coaches ==
Coach	Years
Sue Gaudion	2008
Jane Searle	2009–2011
Norma Plummer	2012–2013
Stacey Marinkovich	2014–2021
Dan Ryan	2022–present

Joyce Brown Coach of the Year

Season	Player
2018	Stacey Marinkovich

== West Coast Fever Reserves ==
The reserve team of West Coast Fever is known as the Fever Reserves, and previously known as the Western Sting. This team currently plays in the Super Netball Reserves competition, which began in 2024, after rebranding from the Australian Netball Championships and prior to that, the Australian Netball League. The Fever Reserves team won the 2025 premiership, beating the Melbourne Mavericks in the grand final 67-57.

== Premierships ==
- Super Netball
  - Winners: 2022
  - Runners Up: 2018, 2020, 2025
  - Minor Premiership: 2025
- Super Netball Reserves / Australian Netball Championships / Australian Netball League
  - Winners: 2017, 2025
  - Minor Premiership: 2025
