= Jessica Anstiss =

Australian netball player

Personal information
- Born: 20 November 1996 (age 29) Western Australia
- Height: 1.75 m (5 ft 9 in)
- School: Darling Range Sports College

Netball career
- Playing positions: C, WD
Years	Club team	Apps
2017–2026	West Coast Fever	149

Jessica Anstiss (born 20 November 1996) is an Australian netball player in the Suncorp Super Netball league, playing for the West Coast Fever.

== Career ==
Anstiss began her netball career in the West Australian Netball League in 2014, earning several underage national team caps along the way. She earned a position as a replacement player for the West Coast Fever in 2016, before being permanently picked up by the Fever before the 2017 Suncorp Super Netball season. She was selected in the Australian Diamonds squad for the 2018/19 international season. Anstiss was awarded the Young Star Award for her performance in the 2018 season. Anstiss was part of the Australian Fast Five team that won the Fast5 Netball World Series in 2022. Anstiss is part of the Fever leadership team, being named Captain since the 2024 season.
