= Stacey Marinkovich =

Australian netball player and coach

Personal information
- Full name: Stacey Marinkovich (Née: Rosman)
- Born: 25 February 1981 (age 45) Brisbane, Queensland, Australia
- Height: 1.71 m (5 ft 7 in)

Netball career
- Playing positions: C, WA
Years	Club team	Apps
1999	Australian Institute of Sport	
2000–2001	Queensland Firebirds	18
2002–2007	Perth Orioles	71
2008–2009	West Coast Fever	
Coaching career
- Years: Team
- 2013–2014: Western Sting
- 2014–2021: West Coast Fever
- 2020–: Australia

Stacey Marinkovich (born 25 February 1981), previously known as Stacey Rosman, is a former Australian netball player and current netball coach. During the Commonwealth Bank Trophy era she played for Queensland Firebirds and Perth Orioles. In the ANZ Championship era she played for West Coast Fever. She captained both Orioles and Fever. After retiring as a player, Rosman became a coach. In 2014 she was appointed head coach of West Coast Fever. In 2018 she guided Fever to their first ever grand final. She was subsequently named Joyce Brown Coach of the Year. In 2020 Rosman, now Marinkovich, was appointed head coach of the Australia national netball team.

== Early life and family ==
Rosman is originally from Queensland and was raised in South Brisbane. She is the oldest of four siblings and has two sisters and a brother. She is married to Lindsay Marinkovich and has one son, Matthew, born in December 2019.

== Playing career ==
=== AIS ===
During the 1999 season, Rosman played for the Australian Institute of Sport. She was coached by Norma Plummer and her team mates included Demelza Fellowes and Cynna Neele.

=== Queensland Firebirds ===
Between 2000 and 2001, Rosman made 18 appearances for Queensland Firebirds in the Commonwealth Bank Trophy.

=== Perth Orioles ===
Between 2002 and 2007, Rosman made 71 appearances for Perth Orioles in the Commonwealth Bank Trophy. She captained Orioles during the 2006 and 2007 seasons. Her Orioles team mates included Caitlin Bassett, Kate Beveridge, Susan Fuhrmann, Jessica Shynn and Larrissa Willcox.

=== West Coast Fever ===
During the 2008 and 2009 ANZ Championship seasons, Rosman played for West Coast Fever. Rosman captained Fever during the 2008 season. During the 2008 season she also made her 100th Commonwealth Bank Trophy/ANZ Championship appearance. She retired as a player at the end of the 2009 season.

== Coaching career ==
=== Western Sting ===
During the 2013 and 2014 seasons, Rosman served as head coach of Western Sting in the Australian Netball League. During the 2014 season she guided them to third place in the league.

=== West Coast Fever ===
During the 2012 and 2013 ANZ Championship seasons, Rosman served an assistant coach to Norma Plummer at West Coast Fever. In 2014 she succeeded Plummer as the Fever head coach. In 2015 Rosman guided Fever to third place in the Australian Conference. She was subsequently named as the head coach in the 2015 ANZ Championship All-Star Team. In August 2016 she signed a new four-year deal to remain as Fever coach. During the 2018 Suncorp Super Netball season Rosman, now Marinkovich, guided Fever to their first ever grand final. She was subsequently named Joyce Brown Coach of the Year.

=== Australia ===
In August 2020 Marinkovich was appointed head coach of the Australia national netball team, succeeding Lisa Alexander. Marinkovich has previously worked as a coach with the national team in various capacities, including coaching the Australian Fast5 Flyers team at the 2017 and 2018 Fast5 Netball World Series'.

Tournaments	Place
2017 Fast5 Netball World Series	3rd place, bronze medalist(s)
2018 Fast5 Netball World Series	3rd place, bronze medalist(s)
2021 Constellation Cup	2nd place, silver medalist(s)
2022 Commonwealth Games	1st place, gold medalist(s)
2023 Netball World Cup	1st place, gold medalist(s)

== Honours ==
=== Head coach ===
West Coast Fever

- Suncorp Super Netball
  - Runners Up: 2018, 2020

=== Individual awards ===
Year	Award
2015	ANZ Championship All Star Coach
2018	Joyce Brown Coach of the Year
