= Sunday Aryang =

Australian netball player

Personal information
- Full name: Sunday Aryang
- Born: 25 December 2000 (age 25)
- Height: 1.82 m (6 ft 0 in)
- School: Governor Stirling Senior High School

Netball career
- Playing positions: GK, GD, WD
Years	Club team	Apps
2019 – present	West Coast Fever	
Years	National team	Caps
2022–	Australia	22
Medal record
Netball
Representing Australia
Netball World Cup
Gold medal – first place	2023 Cape Town	Team
Commonwealth Games
Gold medal – first place	2022 Birmingham	Netball
- Updated on 13 August 2020

Sunday Aryang (born 25 December 2000) is an Ethiopian Australian netball player. Aryang represents the West Coast Fever in Suncorp Super Netball.

Aryang has been described as possessing "high netball nous, stamina and drive through the centre third" as well as "quick footwork and cleanliness at the contest".

Aryang made her debut for the Fever in May 2019, aged 18.
