= Courtney Bruce =

Australian netball player (born 1993)

Personal information
- Nationality: Australian
- Born: 8 December 1993 (age 32) Perth, Western Australia
- Height: 189 cm (6 ft 2 in)

Sport
- Sport: Netball
- Club: Sunshine Coast Lightning
Medal record
Netball
Representing Australia
Netball World Cup
Silver medal – second place	2019 Liverpool	Team
Gold medal – first place	2023 Cape Town	Team
Commonwealth Games
Silver medal – second place	2018 Gold Coast	Netball
Gold medal – first place	2022 Birmingham	Netball

Courtney Bruce (born 8 December 1993) is an Australian netball player. She was part of the Australian squad that won silver at the 2018 Commonwealth Games and was selected in the Australian Diamonds squad for the 2018/19 international season.

She grew up in the southern suburbs of Perth and attended Kelmscott Senior High School. She currently serves as the Fever's Australian Netball Players’ Association delegate.
