= 2020 Collingwood Magpies (netball) season =

Australian netball club season

Collingwood Magpies Netball
- 2020 season
- Head coach: Rob Wright
- Co-captains: Geva Mentor & Madison Browne
- Main venue: Melbourne Arena

Season results
- Wins–losses: 1–13
- Regular season: 8th
- Finals placing: DNQ
- Team colours

Collingwood Magpies Netball seasons
- ← 2019 2021 →

The 2020 Collingwood Magpies season was the club's fourth year of senior competition in the Suncorp Super Netball league. The club would have fielded a reserves team in the Australian Netball League, though were prevented from doing so due to the COVID-19 pandemic.

The Magpies were coached by Rob Wright and co-captained for the second consecutive year by Geva Mentor and Madison Browne. The club entered the season off the back of a fourth-place finish and elimination final defeat in the 2019 season.

== Player changes ==
Summary of 2020 pre-season player movements
▲ Gains	▼ Losses
Melissa Bragg (elevated to senior list); Molly Jovic (temporary replacement signing); Jodi-Ann Ward (new signing from Severn Stars)	April Brandley (maternity leave); Kimiora Poi (returned to Mainland Tactix); Kim Ravaillion (maternity leave)

== Squad ==
2020 Collingwood Magpies roster
Players
Coaching staff

Nat.	Name	Position(s)	DoB	Height
(Australia)	Kelly Altmann (TRP)	C, WA	27 April 1993	1.70 m (5 ft 7 in)
(Australia)	Melissa Bragg	GD, WD	17 December 1994	1.77 m (5 ft 10 in)
(Australia)	Ashleigh Brazill (injured)	WD, C	29 December 1989	1.75 m (5 ft 9 in)
(Australia)	Kelsey Browne (injured)	WA, C	17 January 1992	1.64 m (5 ft 5 in)
(Australia)	Madison Browne	WA, C	5 January 1988	1.68 m (5 ft 6 in)
(Australia)	Matilda Garrett	GD, GK	11 August 1998	1.85 m (6 ft 1 in)
(Australia)	Molly Jovic (TRP)	WA, C	7 October 1995	1.72 m (5 ft 8 in)
(Australia)	Nat Medhurst	GA, GS, WA	20 January 1984	1.78 m (5 ft 10 in)
(England)	Geva Mentor	GK	17 September 1984	1.90 m (6 ft 3 in)
(Jamaica)	Shimona Nelson	GS	1 December 1998	1.95 m (6 ft 5 in)
(Australia)	Gabrielle Sinclair	GA, GS	12 July 1993	1.76 m (5 ft 9 in)
(Jamaica)	Jodi-Ann Ward	GD, WD	1 September 1994	1.75 m (5 ft 9 in)

Head coach

- Rob Wright

Assistant coach

- Nicole Richardson

Assistant coaches

- Kate Upton
- Lauren Blackwood

Manager: Jane Woodlands-Thompson
Strength and conditioning: Chris Howley

Notes

- (c) – Captain
- (cc) – Co-captain
- (vc) – Vice-captain
- – Injury / maternity leave
- (TRP) – Temporary Replacement Player
Player profiles: Team website
Last updated: 1 August 2020

== Pre-season ==
=== Super Club ===
Magpies won the 2019 Netball New Zealand Super Club tournament. They won all five matches, concluding with a 49–42 win against Northern Mystics in the final.

Group B

Sun 8 Dec	Waikato Bay of Plenty Magic	33–52	Collingwood Magpies	Trafalgar Centre
3.30pm	Kelsey McPhee 12/18 (67%); Abigail Latu-Meafou 11/16 (69%); Georgia Marshall 10/12 (83%)	Stats	Shimona Nelson 41/44 (93%); Gabrielle Sinclair 9/12 (75%); Nyah Allen 2/3 (67%)

Mon 9 Dec	Mainland Tactix	38–51	Collingwood Magpies	Trafalgar Centre
6.35pm	Ellie Bird 22/27 (81%); Te Paea Selby-Rickit 12/15 (80%); Jess Prosser 3/4 (75%); Hannah Glen 1/2 (50%)	Stats	Shimona Nelson 33/37 (89%); Natalie Medhurst 14/17 (82%); Nyah Allen 4/5 (80%)

Tue 10 Dec	Northern Stars	41–53	Collingwood Magpies	Trafalgar Centre
3.30pm	Maia Wilson 31/33 (94%); Julianna Naoupu 6/9 (67%); Vika Koloto 4/6 (67%)	Stats	Shimona Nelson 36/38 (95%); Nyah Allen 7/8 (88%); Gabrielle Sinclair 7/9 (78%); Natalie Medhurst 3/3 (100%)

Final ladder

Group B
Pos	Team	P	W	D	L	GF	GA	%	Pts
1	(Australia) Collingwood Magpies	3	3	0	0	156	112	139.29	6
2	(New Zealand) Waikato Bay of Plenty Magic	3	2	0	1	137	134	102.24	4
3	(New Zealand) Mainland Tactix	3	1	0	2	127	145	87.59	2
4	(New Zealand) Northern Stars	3	0	0	3	123	152	80.92	0

Qualified for Semi-finals
5th/8th place classification

Semi-finals

Thu 12 Dec	Collingwood Magpies	54–40	Central Pulse	Trafalgar Centre
6.35pm	Shimona Nelson 41/44 (93%); Natalie Medhurst 10/11 (91%); Gabrielle Sinclair 2/2 (100%); Nyah Allen 1/1 (100%)	Stats	Aliyah Dunn 28/31 (90%); Ameliaranne Ekenasio 9/12 (75%); Tiana Metuarau 3/3 (100%)

Final

Fri 13 Dec; 8.10pm	Stats	Northern Mystics	42–49	Collingwood Magpies	Trafalgar Centre	Sky Sport
Fri 13 Dec; 8.10pm	Stats	Grace Nweke 30/33 (91%); Bailey Mes 7/10 (70%); Saviour Tui 5/7 (71%)		Shimona Nelson 32/37 (86%); Natalie Medhurst 17/18 (94%)	Trafalgar Centre	Sky Sport

== Super Netball season ==
=== Ladder ===
2020 Suncorp Super Netball ladder
Pos	Team	P	W	D	L	GF	GA	%	PTS
1	Melbourne Vixens	14	11	1	2	870	769	113.33	46
2	Sunshine Coast Lightning	14	9	0	5	821	824	99.64	36
3	West Coast Fever	14	8	1	5	964	897	107.46	34
4	New South Wales Swifts	14	8	1	5	898	885	101.46	34
5	Queensland Firebirds	14	6	1	7	851	893	95.29	26
6	Giants Netball	14	5	2	7	885	891	99.32	24
7	Adelaide Thunderbirds	14	5	0	9	769	797	96.48	20
8	Collingwood Magpies	14	1	0	13	770	872	88.30	4
Last updated: 29 September 2020 — Source

=== Results ===
Notes

- Colours: Magpies win Magpies loss Draw
- Home teams are listed left, away teams right.
- The season was scheduled to begin on 2 May, though was postponed to 1 August due to the COVID-19 pandemic.

Sun 3 Aug; 5.30pm	Report; Stats	Melbourne Vixens	63–52	Collingwood Magpies	Nissan Arena	Nine
Sun 3 Aug; 5.30pm	Report; Stats	Scoring by quarter: 15–13, 14–16, 16–14, 18–9			Nissan Arena	Nine
Sun 3 Aug; 5.30pm	Report; Stats	2 Goal Shots; Kumwenda 5/10 (50%); Philip 3/7 (43%); Thwaites 2/3 (67%); 1 Goal Shots; Kumwenda 16/19 (84%); Philip 16/19 (84%); Thwaites 11/11 (100%)		2 Goal Shots; Sinclair 4/6 (67%); Allen 2/3 (67%); 1 Goal Shots; Ryde 34/38 (89%); Sinclair 6/11 (55%)	Nissan Arena	Nine
Sun 3 Aug; 5.30pm	Report; Stats	Round 1			Nissan Arena	Nine

Sat 8 Aug; 1.00pm	Report; Stats	Sunshine Coast Lightning	51–47	Collingwood Magpies	USC Stadium	Nine
Sat 8 Aug; 1.00pm	Report; Stats	Scoring by quarter: 10–11, 11–13, 16–9, 14–14			USC Stadium	Nine
Sat 8 Aug; 1.00pm	Report; Stats	2 Goal Shots; None; 1 Goal Shots; Koenen 38/45 (84%); Proscovia 6/10 (60%); Wood 5/10 (50%); Hunt 2/3 (67%)		2 Goal Shots; Allen 2/2 (100%); Sinclair 1/5 (20%); 1 Goal Shots; Nelson 32/38 (84%); Allen 4/4 (100%); Sinclair 5/8 (63%)	USC Stadium	Nine
Sat 8 Aug; 1.00pm	Report; Stats	Round 2			USC Stadium	Nine

Tue 11 Aug; 7.30pm	Report; Stats	Queensland Firebirds	54–58	Collingwood Magpies	Nissan Arena	Nine
Tue 11 Aug; 7.30pm	Report; Stats	Scoring by quarter: 17–14, 15–14, 13–15, 9–15			Nissan Arena	Nine
Tue 11 Aug; 7.30pm	Report; Stats	2 Goal Shots; Venter 1/2 (50%); Dwan 1/3 (33%); 1 Goal Shots; Aiken 37/42 (88%); Dwan 12/14 (86%); Venter 1/1 (100%)		2 Goal Shots; Sinclair 5/6 (83%); 1 Goal Shots; Nelson 42/45 (93%); Sinclair 2/6 (33%); Allen 4/4 (100%)	Nissan Arena	Nine
Tue 11 Aug; 7.30pm	Report; Stats	Round 3			Nissan Arena	Nine

Sat 15 Aug; 1.00pm	Stats	Collingwood Magpies	62–63	West Coast Fever	Nissan Arena	Nine
Sat 15 Aug; 1.00pm	Stats	Scoring by quarter: 11–21, 18–16, 18–14, 15–12			Nissan Arena	Nine
Sat 15 Aug; 1.00pm	Stats	2 Goal Shots; Sinclair 3/5 (60%); Nelson 1/1 (100%); 1 Goal Shots; Nelson 45/48 (94%); Sinclair 9/11 (82%)		2 Goal Shots; Fowler 1/2 (50%); Stanton 2/2 (100%); 1 Goal Shots; Fowler 53/54 (98%); Teague-Neeld 4/7 (57%)	Nissan Arena	Nine
Sat 15 Aug; 1.00pm	Stats	Round 4			Nissan Arena	Nine

Wed 19 Aug; 7.30pm	Stats	Collingwood Magpies	52–60	Adelaide Thunderbirds	USC Stadium	Nine
Wed 19 Aug; 7.30pm	Stats	Scoring by quarter: 11–17, 11–15, 16–12, 14–16			USC Stadium	Nine
Wed 19 Aug; 7.30pm	Stats	2 Goal Shots; Sinclair 4/7 (57%); Allen 3/5 (60%); 1 Goal Shots; Nelson 23/25 (92%); Sinclair 6/9 (67%); Ryde 5/7 (71%); Allen 4/4 (100%)		2 Goal Shots; Horjus 1/3 (33%); Glasgow 0/3 (0%); 1 Goal Shots; Potgieter 39/39 (100%); Horjus 16/17 (94%); Glasgow 3/3 (100%)	USC Stadium	Nine
Wed 19 Aug; 7.30pm	Stats	Round 5			USC Stadium	Nine

Sat 22 Aug; 1.00pm	Stats	New South Wales Swifts	60–58	Collingwood Magpies	Nissan Arena	Nine
Sat 22 Aug; 1.00pm	Stats	Scoring by quarter: 14–16, 15–13, 15–15, 16–14			Nissan Arena	Nine
Sat 22 Aug; 1.00pm	Stats	2 Goal Shots; Housby 4/9 (44%); Wallace 1/1 (100%); 1 Goal Shots; Wallace 29/29 (100%); Housby 12/12 (100%); Garbin 9/13 (69%)		2 Goal Shots; Sinclair 5/7 (71%); Allen 0/2 (0%); 1 Goal Shots; Nelson 26/30 (87%); Ryde 13/14 (93%); Sinclair 9/10 (90%)	Nissan Arena	Nine
Sat 22 Aug; 1.00pm	Stats	Round 6			Nissan Arena	Nine

Tue 25 Aug; 5.00pm	Stats	West Coast Fever	71–57	Collingwood Magpies	Nissan Arena	Nine
Tue 25 Aug; 5.00pm	Stats	Scoring by quarter: 17–14, 22–16, 15–14, 17–13			Nissan Arena	Nine
Tue 25 Aug; 5.00pm	Stats	2 Goal Shots; Teague-Neeld 2/3 (67%); Stanton 1/1 (100%); 1 Goal Shots; Fowler 62/67 (93%); Teague-Neeld 3/6 (50%)		2 Goal Shots; Sinclair 2/3 (67%); 1 Goal Shots; Ryde 25/29 (86%); Nelson 12/14 (86%); Teague-Neeld 6/8 (75%)	Nissan Arena	Nine
Tue 25 Aug; 5.00pm	Stats	Round 7			Nissan Arena	Nine

Sat 29 Aug; 3.00pm	Stats	Collingwood Magpies	54–69	Giants Netball	Nissan Arena	Nine
Sat 29 Aug; 3.00pm	Stats	Scoring by quarter: 19–11, 13–20, 11–21, 11–17			Nissan Arena	Nine
Sat 29 Aug; 3.00pm	Stats	2 Goal Shots; Sinclair 3/5 (60%); Allen 2/3 (67%); 1 Goal Shots; Nelson 37/43 (86%); Sinclair 7/11 (64%)		2 Goal Shots; Harten 8/11 (73%); Austin 2/5 (40%); 1 Goal Shots; Austin 23/28 (82%); Harten 19/23 (83%); Bassett 7/9 (78%)	Nissan Arena	Nine
Sat 29 Aug; 3.00pm	Stats	Round 8			Nissan Arena	Nine

Tue 1 Sep; 7.30pm	Stats	Collingwood Magpies	54–69	New South Wales Swifts	Nissan Arena	Nine
Tue 1 Sep; 7.30pm	Stats	Scoring by quarter: 13–20, 14–16, 15–12, 12–21			Nissan Arena	Nine
Tue 1 Sep; 7.30pm	Stats	2 Goal Shots; Sinclair 3/6 (50%); Allen 2/5 (40%); Nelson 1/1 (100%); 1 Goal Shots; Ryde 21/25 (84%); Nelson 15/15 (100%); Sinclair 5/7 (71%); Allen 1/1 (100%)		2 Goal Shots; Singleton 2/2 (100%); Wallace 2/3 (67%); Garbin 1/1 (100%); 1 Goal Shots; Wallace 45/48 (94%); Singleton 7/11 (64%); Garbin 7/12 (58%)	Nissan Arena	Nine
Tue 1 Sep; 7.30pm	Stats	Round 9			Nissan Arena	Nine

Sun 6 Sep; 3.00pm	Stats	Adelaide Thunderbirds	61–49	Collingwood Magpies	Priceline Stadium	Nine
Sun 6 Sep; 3.00pm	Stats	Scoring by quarter: 18–14, 15–15, 10–12, 18–8			Priceline Stadium	Nine
Sun 6 Sep; 3.00pm	Stats	2 Goal Shots; Horjus 4/6 (67%); 1 Goal Shots; Potgieter 41/46 (89%); Horjus 12/18 (67%)		2 Goal Shots; Sinclair 5/7 (71%); Nelson 2/5 (40%); 1 Goal Shots; Nelson 21/27 (78%); Sinclair 9/14 (64%); Ryde 5/5 (100%)	Priceline Stadium	Nine
Sun 6 Sep; 3.00pm	Stats	Round 10			Priceline Stadium	Nine

Wed 9 Sep; 5.00pm	Stats	Giants Netball	62–58	Collingwood Magpies	USC Stadium	Nine
Wed 9 Sep; 5.00pm	Stats	Scoring by quarter: 9–13, 18–13, 19–16, 16–16			USC Stadium	Nine
Wed 9 Sep; 5.00pm	Stats	2 Goal Shots; Harten 4/8 (50%); Austin 1/3 (33%); 1 Goal Shots; Bassett 19/20 (95%); Harten 19/21 (90%); Austin 14/20 (70%)		2 Goal Shots; Sinclair 6/10 (60%); Allen 1/2 (50%); 1 Goal Shots; Nelson 29/35 (83%); Sinclair 10/13 (77%); Allen 3/3 (100%); Ryde 2/3 (67%)	USC Stadium	Nine
Wed 9 Sep; 5.00pm	Stats	Round 11			USC Stadium	Nine

Sat 12 Sep; 3.00pm	Stats	Collingwood Magpies	53–61	Melbourne Vixens	Nissan Arena	Nine
Sat 12 Sep; 3.00pm	Stats	Scoring by quarter: 17–12, 9–18, 13–16, 14–15			Nissan Arena	Nine
Sat 12 Sep; 3.00pm	Stats	2 Goal Shots; Sinclair 2/4 (50%); Allen 12; 1 Goal Shots; Nelson 43/44 (98%); Sinclair 4/5 (80%)		2 Goal Shots; Thwaites 2/2 (100%); Kumwnenda 2/3 (67%); 1 Goal Shots; Philip 22/26 (85%); Thwaites 19/20 (95%); Kumwenda 12/13 (92%)	Nissan Arena	Nine
Sat 12 Sep; 3.00pm	Stats	Round 12			Nissan Arena	Nine

Wed 16 Sep; 7.30pm	Stats	Collingwood Magpies	53–63	Sunshine Coast Lightning	Townsville Entertainment and Convention Centre	Nine
Wed 16 Sep; 7.30pm	Stats	Scoring by quarter: 12–16, 15–19, 13–14, 13–14			Townsville Entertainment and Convention Centre	Nine
Wed 16 Sep; 7.30pm	Stats	2 Goal Shots; Sinclair 3/6 (50%); 1 Goal Shots; Nelson 40/44 (91%); Sinclair 7/9 (78%)		2 Goal Shots; Wood 4/5 (80%); 1 Goal Shots; Koenen 41/45 (91%); Proscovia 8/9 (89%); Wood 6/7 (86%)	Townsville Entertainment and Convention Centre	Nine
Wed 16 Sep; 7.30pm	Stats	Round 13			Townsville Entertainment and Convention Centre	Nine

Sat 26 Sep; 1.00pm	Stats	Collingwood Magpies	63–65	Queensland Firebirds	Nissan Arena	Nine
Sat 26 Sep; 1.00pm	Stats	Scoring by quarter: 18–19, 17–15, 16–13, 12–18			Nissan Arena	Nine
Sat 26 Sep; 1.00pm	Stats	2 Goal Shots; Sinclair 6/10 (60%); 1 Goal Shots; Nelson 42/43 (98%); Sinclair 9/12 (75%)		2 Goal Shots; Dwan 3/5 (60%); Aiken 1/1 (100%); 1 Goal Shots; Aiken 47/52 (90%); Dwan 10/13 (77%)	Nissan Arena	Nine
Sat 26 Sep; 1.00pm	Stats	Round 14			Nissan Arena	Nine

== Statistics ==
As of 1 January 2020
Player	GS	GA	G%	A	R	CPR	I	D	P	T
Melissa Bragg	0	0	0	0	0	0	0	0	0	0
Ashleigh Brazill	0	0	0	0	0	0	0	0	0	0
Kelsey Browne	0	0	0	0	0	0	0	0	0	0
Madison Browne	0	0	0	0	0	0	0	0	0	0
Matilda Garrett	0	0	0	0	0	0	0	0	0	0
Molly Jovic	0	0	0	0	0	0	0	0	0	0
Nat Medhurst	0	0	0	0	0	0	0	0	0	0
Geva Mentor	0	0	0	0	0	0	0	0	0	0
Shimona Nelson	0	0	0	0	0	0	0	0	0	0
Gabrielle Sinclair	0	0	0	0	0	0	0	0	0	0
Jodi-Ann Ward	0	0	0	0	0	0	0	0	0	0

Statistics key
GS	Goals scored	A	Assists	I	Intercepts
GA	Goal attempts	R	Rebounds	D	Deflections
G%	Goal percentage	CPR	Centre pass receives	P	Penalties
= Competition leader				T	Turnovers conceded

== See also ==
- 2020 Suncorp Super Netball season
- 2020 Collingwood Football Club season
