= 2020 Suncorp Super Netball season =

- League: Suncorp Super Netball
- Sport: Netball
- Duration: 1 August – 18 October
- Teams: 8
- TV partner: Nine Network
- Streaming partner(s): 9Now and Telstra TV

Regular season
- Minor premiers: Melbourne Vixens
- Season MVP: Jhaniele Fowler
- Top scorer: Jhaniele Fowler (795 points)

Finals
- Champions: Melbourne Vixens
- Runners-up: West Coast Fever
- Grand Final MVP: Mwai Kumwenda

Seasons
- ← 2019 2021 →

The 2020 Suncorp Super Netball season was the fourth season of the premier netball league in Australia. The season was originally scheduled to commence on 2 May, though was delayed to 1 August due to the COVID-19 pandemic. The defending premiers, New South Wales Swifts were eliminated in the first week of the finals series by the eventual runners-up West Coast Fever. The premiers were the Melbourne Vixens, who defeated the Fever by two goals in the Grand Final at Nissan Arena in Brisbane.

== Overview ==
=== Teams ===
Team	Captain/s	Coach	Home Courts	Ref.
Adelaide Thunderbirds	Chelsea Pitman & Hannah Petty	Tania Obst	Priceline Stadium; Adelaide Entertainment Centre	
Collingwood Magpies	Madison Browne & Geva Mentor	Rob Wright	Melbourne Arena; Silverdome	
GIANTS Netball	Jo Harten	Julie Fitzgerald	Ken Rosewall Arena; AIS Arena	
Melbourne Vixens	Kate Moloney & Liz Watson	Simone McKinnis	Melbourne Arena; Margaret Court Arena	
NSW Swifts	Maddy Proud	Briony Akle	Ken Rosewall Arena	
Queensland Firebirds	Gabi Simpson	Roselee Jencke	Nissan Arena	
Sunshine Coast Lightning	Laura Langman	Kylee Byrne	USC Stadium	
West Coast Fever	Courtney Bruce	Stacey Marinkovich	RAC Arena	

=== Format ===
The season is played over fourteen rounds, allowing every team to play each other twice, once at home and once away. The top four teams on the ladder at the conclusion of the regular season qualify for the finals series. In the first week of the finals series, the 1st ranked team hosts the 2nd ranked team in the major semi-final (with the winner of that match to qualify for the Grand Final) and the 3rd ranked team hosts the 4th ranked team in the minor semi-final (with the loser of that match eliminated). The loser of the major semi-final then hosts the winner of the minor semi-final in the preliminary final. The winner of the major semi-final then hosts the winner of the preliminary final in the Grand Final.

=== Rule changes ===
The Super Netball commission announced changes to the league structure in February. Rolling substitutions during play will be permitted, as well as during stoppages and intervals, with no limit to the number of substitutions that can be made, and multiple substitutions allowed to be made at any one time. The substitute must tag hands with the player leaving the court before entering the field of play. Extra time in the event of draws was introduced, after six matches were tied throughout the previous season. The match was to enter one 5-minute period of extra time. If at the end of this period teams remain tied, the match was to have been declared a draw. If a team has a one-goal or greater advantage at the end of the period, they would have been declared the winner. The bonus point system in place for the past two seasons was also supposed to remain in place. However, in the days leading up to the season, the league announced it had scrapped bonus points and extra time, citing the need to mitigate the physical impact of the condensed fixture on the players. Teams were also allowed to increase their match-day squads to 12 players, up from 10 in previous years.

=== Two-goal super shots ===
After confirming the return of the league on 1 August, competition administrators announced the introduction of the two-point shot rule alteration. The new rule allows a score of two goals to be awarded to any shooter or attacker who scores in the two-goal zone outside the usual goal circle. The move was met with disapproval from many fans and players, though Super Netball CEO Chris Symington argued "the time is right to introduce an innovation that will make the game even more dynamic and unpredictable". The two-goal shot zone will only be activated in the final five minutes of each quarter and in the five-minute extra time period.

=== Relocation to Queensland ===
As a result of an increase in COVID-19 positive tests in Victoria, the league initially announced the temporary relocation of the two Victorian teams (Magpies and Vixens) to Queensland. Shortly afterwards, the league revealed it had come to an arrangement with the Queensland Government to move all clubs to a hub in South-East Queensland, thereby allowing a condensed fixture, with most matches played in Brisbane, Gold Coast, Sunshine Coast, Cairns and Townsville. The two Victorian clubs were required to serve a 14-day quarantine prior to the start of the season.

== Player transfers ==
The league unveiled the list of non-contracted athletes on 14 August 2019, two weeks before that season's finals series were scheduled to commence. Teams had the exclusive right to re-sign any of their existing contracted players, their permanent/temporary replacement players or training partners, on single year or multi-year contracts for the 2020 and 2021 seasons. Contracts with players from other teams and leagues could not be announced until the signing period commenced on 16 September 2019. This period closed on 14 October 2019, upon which teams were required to have submitted their 10 senior-listed players for the 2020 season. Training partners could be signed by clubs at any time.

=== Signings ===
The following table is a list of players who moved clubs/leagues into Super Netball, or were elevated into a permanent position in the senior team, during the off-season. It does not include players who were re-signed by their original Super Netball clubs.

Name	Moving from	Moving to	Ref
(New Zealand) Kayla Johnson	(New Zealand) Northern Stars	New South Wales Swifts	
(Australia) Maddie Hay	(Australia) GIANTS Netball (ANL; training partner)	GIANTS Netball	
(Australia) Kate Eddy	(Australia) New South Wales Swifts	Melbourne Vixens	
(South Africa) Ine-Mari Venter	(Australia) Melbourne Vixens	Queensland Firebirds	
(Australia) Rudi Ellis	(Australia) Victorian Fury (ANL)	Queensland Firebirds	
(Australia) Macy Gardner	(Australia) Queensland Fusion (ANL; training partner)	Queensland Firebirds	
(Australia) Lara Dunkley†	(Australia) Melbourne Vixens	Queensland Firebirds	
(Australia) Maisie Nankivell	(Australia) Southern Force (ANL)	Adelaide Thunderbirds	
(South Africa) Lenize Potgieter	(New Zealand) Southern Steel	Adelaide Thunderbirds	
(Australia) Molly Jovic†	(Australia) Tasmanian Magpies (ANL)	Collingwood Magpies	
(Australia) Melissa Bragg	(Australia) Tasmanian Magpies (ANL; training partner)	Collingwood Magpies	
(Jamaica) Jodi-Ann Ward	(England) Severn Stars	Collingwood Magpies	

† Indicates player was signed as an injury-replacement player

== Pre-season ==
=== Bushfire Relief Match ===
In January 2020, Netball Australia announced an All-Stars match for the pre-season featuring the Australian Diamonds and the best players from the Super Netball league. The match was played as a fundraiser for relief efforts for the 2019–20 Australian bushfire season, which had been particularly devastating. The teams were announced on 29 January 2020.

1 March 2020; 1:00 pm	Report	Australia	63–56	(United Nations) All-Stars	Qudos Bank Arena, Sydney

=== Team Girls Cup ===
The league's pre-season tournament, known as the Suncorp Team Girls Cup, was set to return for the second time. The tournament would have taken place between 27 and 29 March at the refurbished Ken Rosewall Arena.

However, on 13 March 2020, the league announced that the event would be cancelled due to the COVID-19 pandemic.

== Regular season ==
- The original fixture was abandoned due to the COVID-19 pandemic. The league unveiled six rounds of the revised fixture on 24 July 2020, though subsequent announcements of travel restrictions in Australia forced those fixtures to be re-arranged.

=== Round 1 ===
Sat 1 Aug	Queensland Firebirds	48–66	Sunshine Coast Lightning	Nissan Arena
1.00pm	2 Goal Shots; Dwan 3/5 (60%); Venter 2/4 (50%); Stower 1/3 (33%); 1 Goal Shots; Aiken 26/33 (79%); Dwan 8/12 (67%); Venter 2/3 (67%); Stower 0/1 (0%)	Report; Stats	2 Goal Shots; Wood 10/11 (91%); Koenen 1/2 (50%); 1 Goal Shots; Koenen 34/40 (85%); Wood 4/8 (50%); Proscovia 6/8 (75%)

Sat 1 Aug	Adelaide Thunderbirds	62–74	West Coast Fever	Nissan Arena
3.00pm	2 Goal Shots; Gooden 9/10 (90%); Potgieter 1/2 (50%); 1 Goal Shots; Potgieter 34/35 (97%); Gooden 1/4 (25%); Horjus 6/11 (55%); Hodges 1/3 (33%)	Report; Stats	2 Goal Shots; Teague-Neeld 4/4 (100%); Fowler 3/4 (75%); Cosh 1/2 (50%); 1 Goal Shots; Fowler 50/53 (94%); Teague-Neeld 6/11 (55%); Stanton 2/6 (33%)

Sun 2 Aug	Giants Netball	61–63	New South Wales Swifts	Nissan Arena
1.00pm	2 Goal Shots; Harten 9/13 (69%); Dwyer 2/2 (100%); Austin 2/3 (67%); 1 Goal Shots; Bassett 22/24 (92%); Harten 11/11 (100%); Austin 2/2 (100%)	Report; Stats	2 Goal Shots; Wallace 6/13 (46%); Housby 2/3 (67%); 1 Goal Shots; Wallace 27/27 (100%); Garbin 11/13 (85%); Housby 9/10 (90%)

Sun 2 Aug	Melbourne Vixens	63–52	Collingwood Magpies	Nissan Arena
5.30pm	2 Goal Shots; Kumwenda 5/10 (50%); Philip 3/7 (43%); Thwaites 2/3 (67%); 1 Goal Shots; Kumwenda 16/19 (84%); Philip 16/19 (84%); Thwaites 11/11 (100%)	Report; Stats	2 Goal Shots; Sinclair 4/6 (67%); Allen 2/3 (67%); 1 Goal Shots; Ryde 34/38 (89%); Sinclair 6/11 (55%)

=== Round 2 ===
Sat 8 Aug	Giants Netball	51–59	Adelaide Thunderbirds	Nissan Arena
1.00pm	2 Goal Shots; Harten 6/13 (46%); Austin 2/9 (22%); 1 Goal Shots; Harten 14/17 (82%); Bassett 12/15 (80%); Austin 9/14 (64%)	Report; Stats	2 Goal Shots; Horjus 3/5 (60%); Potgieter 1/1 (100%); 1 Goal Shots; Potgieter 42/44 (95%); Horjus 9/11 (82%)

Sat 8 Aug	Queensland Firebirds	50–78	Melbourne Vixens	Nissan Arena
3.00pm	2 Goal Shots; Venter 3/8 (38%); Dwan 2/5 (40%); 1 Goal Shots; Aiken 35/43 (81%); Dwan 5/6 (83%)	Report; Stats	2 Goal Shots; Thwaites 6/10 (60%); Philip 4/4 (100%); Kumwenda 3/5 (60%); 1 Goal Shots; Kumwenda 20/22 (91%); Philip 19/23 (83%); Thwaites 13/13 (100%)

Sun 9 Aug	Sunshine Coast Lightning	51–47	Collingwood Magpies	USC Stadium
1.00pm	2 Goal Shots; None; 1 Goal Shots; Koenen 38/45 (84%); Proscovia 6/10 (60%); Wood 5/10 (50%); Hunt 2/3 (67%)	Report; Stats	2 Goal Shots; Allen 2/2 (100%); Sinclair 1/5 (20%); 1 Goal Shots; Nelson 32/38 (84%); Allen 4/4 (100%); Sinclair 5/8 (63%)

Sun 9 Aug	New South Wales Swifts	73–72	West Coast Fever	USC Stadium
3.30pm	2 Goal Shots; Housby 6/11 (55%); Wallace 2/5 (40%); 1 Goal Shots; Garbin 28/32 (88%); Wallace 16/20 (80%); Housby 13/14 (93%)	Report; Stats	2 Goal Shots; Fowlier 4/7 (57%); Teague-Neeld 3/5 (60%); 1 Goal Shots; Fowler 49/51 (96%); Teague-Neeld 8/10 (80%); Stanton 1/1 (100%)

=== Round 3 ===
Tue 11 Aug	Giants Netball	75–68	West Coast Fever	Nissan Arena
5.00pm	2 Goal Shots; Harten 6/7 (86%); 1 Goal Shots; Bassett 47/53 (89%); Harten 16/18 (89%)	Report; Stats	2 Goal Shots; Stanton 3/4 (75%); Teague-Neeld 1/2 (50%); Fowler 1/8 (13%); 1 Goal Shots; Fowler 57/58 (98%); Teague-Neeld 1/2 (50%)

Tue 11 Aug	Queensland Firebirds	54–58	Collingwood Magpies	Nissan Arena
7.30pm	2 Goal Shots; Venter 1/2 (50%); Dwan 1/3 (33%); 1 Goal Shots; Aiken 37/42 (88%); Dwan 12/14 (86%); Venter 1/1 (100%)	Report; Stats	2 Goal Shots; Sinclair 5/6 (83%); 1 Goal Shots; Nelson 42/45 (93%); Sinclair 2/6 (33%); Allen 4/4 (100%)

Wed 12 Aug	New South Wales Swifts	66–51	Adelaide Thunderbirds	USC Stadium
5.00pm	2 Goal Shots; Housby 5/7 (71%); Wallace 2/4 (50%); 1 Goal Shots; Wallace 25/26 (96%); Housby 16/20 (80%); Garbin 10/13 (77%); Singleton 1/2 (50%)	Report; Stats	2 Goal Shots; Glasgow 7/10 (70%); 1 Goal Shots; Potgieter 18/19 (95%); Glasgow 9/11 (82%); Horjus 7/8 (88%); Gooden 3/5 (60%)

Wed 12 Aug	Melbourne Vixens	63–51	Sunshine Coast Lightning	USC Stadium
7.30pm	2 Goal Shots; Thwaites 3/4 (75%); Philip 3/6 (50%); 1 Goal Shots; Kumwenda 21/21 (100%); Philip 16/19 (84%); Thwaites 14/20 (70%)	Report; Stats	2 Goal Shots; Wood 2/5 (40%); Koenen 1/1 (100%); 1 Goal Shots; Koenen 29/33 (88%); Wood 9/12 (75%); Proscovia 7/9 (78%)

=== Round 4 ===
Sat 15 Aug	Collingwood Magpies	62–63	West Coast Fever	Nissan Arena
1.00pm	2 Goal Shots; Sinclair 3/5 (60%); Nelson 1/1 (100%); 1 Goal Shots; Nelson 45/48 (94%); Sinclair 9/11 (82%)	Stats	2 Goal Shots; Fowler 1/2 (50%); Stanton 2/2 (100%); 1 Goal Shots; Fowler 53/54 (98%); Teague-Neeld 4/7 (57%)

Sat 15 Aug	Queensland Firebirds	61–61	Giants Netball	Nissan Arena
3.00pm	2 Goal Shots; Dwan 3/5 (60%); 1 Goal Shots; Aiken 49/57 (86%); Dwan 4/5 (80%); Venter 2/2 (100%)	Stats	2 Goal Shots; Harten 5/11 (45%); Austin 4/6 (67%); 1 Goal Shots; Bassett 25/29 (86%); Austin 9/9 (100%); Harten 6/7 (86%); Letherbarrow 3/4 (75%)

Sun 16 Aug	Sunshine Coast Lightning	65–58	New South Wales Swifts	USC Stadium
1.00pm	2 Goal Shots; Wood 1/4 (25%); Koenen 0/1 (0%); 1 Goal Shots; Koenen 53/58 (91%); Wood 10/12 (83%)	Stats	2 Goal Shots; Housby 6/10 (60%); Wallace 3/7 (43%); 1 Goal Shots; Wallace 29/33 (88%); Housby 2/3 (67%)

Sun 16 Aug	Melbourne Vixens	47–54	Adelaide Thunderbirds	USC Stadium
3.30pm	2 Goal Shots; Thwaites 3/4 (75%); Philip 1/1 (100%); 1 Goal Shots; Kumwenda 25/27 (93%); Philip 8/12 (67%); Thwaites 6/7 (86%)	Stats	2 Goal Shots; Horjus 3/5 (60%); Glasgow 2/2 (100%); 1 Goal Shots; Potgieter 32/32 (100%); Horjus 9/11 (82%); Glasgow 3/5 (60%)

=== Round 5 ===
Tue 18 Aug	West Coast Fever	59–68	Melbourne Vixens	Nissan Arena
5.00pm	2 Goal Shots; Cosh 2/2 (100%); Fowler 1/6 (17%); Stanton 0/3 (0%); Teague-Neeld 0/1 (0%); 1 Goal Shots; Fowler 47/48 (98%); Stanton 2/2 (100%); Cosh 2/3 (67%); Teague-Neeld 2/4 (50%)	Stats	2 Goal Shots; Philip 9/11 (82%); Thwaites 1/5 (20%); 1 Goal Shots; Thwaites 30/31 (97%); Philip 18/19 (95%)

Tue 18 Aug	Queensland Firebirds	57–64	New South Wales Swifts	Nissan Arena
7.30pm	2 Goal Shots; Dwan 4/6 (67%); Venter 2/4 (50%); 1 Goal Shots; Aiken 37/45 (82%); Fowler 47/48 (98%); Dwan 8/9 (89%)	Stats	2 Goal Shots; Housby 5/7 (71%); 1 Goal Shots; Wallace 41/47 (87%); Housby 12/16 (75%); Garbin 1/2 (50%)

Wed 19 Aug	Collingwood Magpies	52–60	Adelaide Thunderbirds	USC Stadium
5.00pm	2 Goal Shots; Sinclair 4/7 (57%); Allen 3/5 (60%); 1 Goal Shots; Nelson 23/25 (92%); Sinclair 6/9 (67%); Ryde 5/7 (71%); Allen 4/4 (100%)	Stats	2 Goal Shots; Horjus 1/3 (33%); Glasgow 0/3 (0%); 1 Goal Shots; Potgieter 39/39 (100%); Horjus 16/17 (94%); Glasgow 3/3 (100%)

Wed 19 Aug	Sunshine Coast Lightning	58–57	Giants Netball	USC Stadium
7.30pm	2 Goal Shots; Wood 2/7 (29%); Hunt 1/1 (100%); 1 Goal Shots; Koenen 32/34 (94%); Wood 11/14 (79%); Proscovia 8/8 (100%); Hunt 1/3 (33%)	Stats	2 Goal Shots; Harten 3/7 (43%); Austin 2/4 (50%); 1 Goal Shots; Harten 22/26 (85%); Austin 16/20 (80%); Bassett 9/11 (82%)

=== Round 6 ===
Sat 22 Aug	New South Wales Swifts	60–58	Collingwood Magpies	Nissan Arena
1.00pm	2 Goal Shots; Housby 4/9 (44%); Wallace 1/1 (100%); 1 Goal Shots; Wallace 29/29 (100%); Housby 12/12 (100%); Garbin 9/13 (69%)	Stats	2 Goal Shots; Sinclair 5/7 (71%); Allen 0/2 (0%); 1 Goal Shots; Nelson 26/30 (87%); Ryde 13/14 (93%); Sinclair 9/10 (90%)

Sat 22 Aug	West Coast Fever	57–68	Queensland Firebirds	Nissan Arena
3.00pm	2 Goal Shots; Stanton 3/6 (50%); Fowler 2/3 (67%); Teague-Neeld 0/2 (0%); 1 Goal Shots; Fowler 46/48 (96%); Teague-Neeld 1/3 (33%); Stanton 0/1 (0%)	Stats	2 Goal Shots; Dwan 3/5 (60%); Aiken 1/2 (50%); Venter 1/5 (20%); 1 Goal Shots; Aiken 40/48 (83%); Dwan 17/19 (89%); Venter 1/3 (33%)

Sun 23 Aug	Melbourne Vixens	63–58	Giants Netball	USC Stadium
1.00pm	2 Goal Shots; Kumwenda 3/4 (75%); Philip 2/5 (40%); Thwaites 1/5 (20%); 1 Goal Shots; Thwaites 23/23 (100%); Kumwenda 22/24 (92%); Philip 6/7 (86%)	Stats	2 Goal Shots; Austin 8/9 (89%); Harten 3/6 (50%); 1 Goal Shots; Austin 22/25 (88%); Harten 14/16 (88%)

Sun 23 Aug	Sunshine Coast Lightning	53–45	Adelaide Thunderbirds	USC Stadium
3.30pm	2 Goal Shots; Wood 0/1 (0%); 1 Goal Shots; Koenen 32/36 (89%); Wood 14/19 (74%); Proscovia 7/7 (100%)	Stats	2 Goal Shots; Horjus 2/6 (33%); Glasgow 1/6 (17%); 1 Goal Shots; Potgieter 28/29 (97%); Horjus 9/12 (75%); Glasgow 2/4 (50%)

=== Round 7 ===
Tue 25 Aug	West Coast Fever	71–57	Collingwood Magpies	Nissan Arena
5.00pm	2 Goal Shots; Teague-Neeld 2/3 (67%); Stanton 1/1 (100%); 1 Goal Shots; Fowler 62/67 (93%); Teague-Neeld 3/6 (50%)	Stats	2 Goal Shots; Sinclair 2/3 (67%); 1 Goal Shots; Ryde 25/29 (86%); Nelson 12/14 (86%); Teague-Neeld 6/8 (75%)

Tue 25 Aug	Giants Netball	66–65	Queensland Firebirds	Nissan Arena
7.30pm	2 Goal Shots; Harten 2/4 (50%); 1 Goal Shots; Bassett 37/43 (86%); Harten 19/20 (95%); Austin 6/7 (86%)	Stats	2 Goal Shots; Dwan 4/6 (67%); Aiken 2/2 (100%); 1 Goal Shots; Aiken 43/49 (88%); Dwan 10/11 (91%)

Wed 26 Aug	New South Wales Swifts	61–54	Sunshine Coast Lightning	Nissan Arena
5.00pm	2 Goal Shots; Housby 1/3 (33%); Wallace 1/3 (33%); 1 Goal Shots; Wallace 23/23 (100%); Housby 23/24 (96%); Garbin 11/15 (73%)	Stats	2 Goal Shots; Wood 1/3 (33%); 1 Goal Shots; Koenen 28/30 (93%); Proscovia 14/17 (82%); Wood 10/16 (63%)

Wed 26 Aug	Adelaide Thunderbirds	43–50	Melbourne Vixens	Nissan Arena
7.30pm	2 Goal Shots; Glasgow 1/2 (50%); Horjus 1/2 (50%); 1 Goal Shots; Potgieter 29/31 (94%); Horjus 8/11 (73%); Glasgow 2/2 (100%)	Stats	2 Goal Shots; Thwaites 0/1 (0%); 1 Goal Shots; Thwaites 30/31 (97%); Philip 14/21 (67%); Kumwenda 6/6 (100%)

=== Round 8 ===
Sat 29 Aug	Melbourne Vixens	63–60	New South Wales Swifts	Nissan Arena
1.00pm	2 Goal Shots; Kumwenda 0/1 (0%); 1 Goal Shots; Kumwenda 46/49 (94%); Philip 12/16 (75%); Thwaites 5/5 (100%)	Stats	2 Goal Shots; Wallace 3/5 (60%); Housby 1/3 (33%); 1 Goal Shots; Wallace 43/45 (96%); Garbin 6/8 (75%); Housby 3/3 (100%)

Sat 29 Aug	Collingwood Magpies	54–69	Giants Netball	Nissan Arena
3.00pm	2 Goal Shots; Sinclair 3/5 (60%); Allen 2/3 (67%); 1 Goal Shots; Nelson 37/43 (86%); Sinclair 7/11 (64%)	Stats	2 Goal Shots; Harten 8/11 (73%); Austin 2/5 (40%); 1 Goal Shots; Austin 23/28 (82%); Harten 19/23 (83%); Bassett 7/9 (78%)

Sun 30 Aug	Queensland Firebirds	54–53	Adelaide Thunderbirds	Nissan Arena
1.00pm	2 Goal Shots; Dwan 2/5 (40%); 1 Goal Shots; Aiken 40/45 (89%); Dwan 10/11 (91%)	Stats	2 Goal Shots; Horjus 4/8 (50%); Glasgow 0/1 (0%); 1 Goal Shots; Glasgow 21/25 (84%); Horjus 19/22 (86%); Potgieter 5/6 (83%)

Sun 30 Aug	West Coast Fever	80–56	Sunshine Coast Lightning	Nissan Arena
3.30pm	2 Goal Shots; Teague-Neeld 3/4 (75%); Stanton 2/2 (100%); Fowler 0/1 (0%); 1 Goal Shots; Fowler 57/58 (98%); Teague-Neeld 7/8 (88%); Stanton 6/8 (75%)	Stats	2 Goal Shots; Wood 7/9 (78%); Koenen 0/2 (0%); Lawrie 0/2 (0%); Proscovia 0/1 (0%); 1 Goal Shots; Koenen 18/21 (86%); Wood 14/18 (78%); Proscovia 9/9 (100%); Lawrie 1/1 (100%)

=== Round 9 ===
Tue 1 Sep	Giants Netball	53–73	Melbourne Vixens	Nissan Arena
5.00pm	2 Goal Shots; Harten 7/10 (70%); Austin 2/6 (33%); Letherbarrow 0/2 (0%); 1 Goal Shots; Austin 12/15 (80%); Bassett 12/15 (80%); Harten 11/13 (85%)	Stats	2 Goal Shots; Kumwenda 2/3 (67%); Thwaites 2/4 (50%); 1 Goal Shots; Kumwenda 30/32 (94%); Thwaites 18/19 (95%); Philip 17/21 (81%)

Tue 1 Sep	Collingwood Magpies	54–69	New South Wales Swifts	Nissan Arena
7.30pm	2 Goal Shots; Sinclair 3/6 (50%); Allen 2/5 (40%); Nelson 1/1 (100%); 1 Goal Shots; Ryde 21/25 (84%); Nelson 15/15 (100%); Sinclair 5/7 (71%); Allen 1/1 (100%)	Stats	2 Goal Shots; Singleton 2/2 (100%); Wallace 2/3 (67%); Garbin 1/1 (100%); 1 Goal Shots; Wallace 45/48 (94%); Singleton 7/11 (64%); Garbin 7/12 (58%)

Wed 2 Sep	Adelaide Thunderbirds	50–56	Sunshine Coast Lightning	Nissan Arena
5.00pm	2 Goal Shots; Potgieter 2/2 (100%); Horjus 2/3 (67%); Glasgow 1/1 (100%); 1 Goal Shots; Potgieter 25/27 (93%); Horjus 15/21 (71%)	Stats	2 Goal Shots; Wood 1/3 (33%); 1 Goal Shots; Koenen 23/28 (82%); Wood 16/20 (80%); Proscovia 15/15 (100%)

Wed 2 Sep	Queensland Firebirds	60–71	West Coast Fever	Nissan Arena
7.30pm	2 Goal Shots; Dwan 4/9 (44%); Venter 2/3 (67%); Aiken 0/1 (0%); 1 Goal Shots; Aiken 45/56 (80%); Dwan 3/4 (75%)	Stats	2 Goal Shots; Teague-Neeld 1/5 (20%); 1 Goal Shots; Fowler 63/65 (97%); Teague-Neeld 6/8 (75%)

=== Round 10 ===
Sat 5 Sep	Melbourne Vixens	63–63	West Coast Fever	Nissan Arena
1.00pm	2 Goal Shots; Kumwenda 5/9 (56%); Thwaites 4/6 (67%); 1 Goal Shots; Kumwenda 23/24 (96%); Thwaites 18/18 (100%); Philip 4/4 (100%)	Stats	2 Goal Shots; Teague-Neeld 1/5 (20%); 1 Goal Shots; Fowler 59/62 (95%); Teague-Neeld 2/3 (67%)

Sat 5 Sep	New South Wales Swifts	64–77	Queensland Firebirds	Nissan Arena
3.00pm	2 Goal Shots; Housby 4/10 (40%); Wallace 2/6 (33%); 1 Goal Shots; Wallace 41/42 (98%); Housby 9/9 (100%); Garbin 2/3 (67%)	Stats	2 Goal Shots; Dwan 8/9 (89%); 1 Goal Shots; Aiken 43/53 (81%); Dwan 18/22 (82%)

Sun 6 Sep	Giants Netball	65–67	Sunshine Coast Lightning	USC Stadium
1.00pm	2 Goal Shots; Harten 7/8 (88%); Austin 5/9 (56%); 1 Goal Shots; Austin 26/33 (79%); Harten 15/20 (75%)	Stats	2 Goal Shots; Wood 4/7 (57%); 1 Goal Shots; Koenen 31/32 (97%); Wood 15/18 (83%); Proscovia 13/15 (87%)

Sun 6 Sep	Adelaide Thunderbirds	61–49	Collingwood Magpies	Priceline Stadium
3.00pm	2 Goal Shots; Horjus 4/6 (67%); 1 Goal Shots; Potgieter 41/46 (89%); Horjus 12/18 (67%)	Stats	2 Goal Shots; Sinclair 5/7 (71%); Nelson 2/5 (40%); 1 Goal Shots; Nelson 21/27 (78%); Sinclair 9/14 (64%); Ryde 5/5 (100%)

=== Round 11 ===
Tue 8 Sep	New South Wales Swifts	59–62	Melbourne Vixens	USC Stadium
5.00pm	2 Goal Shots; Housby 3/7 (43%); Garbin 2/3 (67%); Wallace 1/2 (50%); 1 Goal Shots; Wallace 29/31 (94%); Housby 9/9 (100%); Garbin 5/5 (100%)	Stats	2 Goal Shots; Thwaites 2/2 (100%); Kumwenda 1/3 (33%); 1 Goal Shots; Kumwenda 47/48 (98%); Thwaites 9/12 (75%)

Tue 8 Sep	Sunshine Coast Lightning	52–72	West Coast Fever	USC Stadium
7.30pm	2 Goal Shots; Wood 3/5 (60%); 1 Goal Shots; Koenen 29/32 (91%); Wood 12/14 (86%); Proscovia 5/5 (100%)	Stats	2 Goal Shots; Teague-Neeld 4/8 (50%); 1 Goal Shots; Fowler 55/58 (95%); Teague-Neeld 9/12 (75%)

Wed 9 Sep	Giants Netball	62–58	Collingwood Magpies	USC Stadium
5.00pm	2 Goal Shots; Harten 4/8 (50%); Austin 1/3 (33%); 1 Goal Shots; Bassett 19/20 (95%); Harten 19/21 (90%); Austin 14/20 (70%)	Stats	2 Goal Shots; Sinclair 6/10 (60%); Allen 1/2 (50%); 1 Goal Shots; Nelson 29/35 (83%); Sinclair 10/13 (77%); Allen 3/3 (100%); Ryde 2/3 (67%)

Wed 9 Sep	Adelaide Thunderbirds	59–61	Queensland Firebirds	Priceline Stadium
7.00pm	2 Goal Shots; Horjus 7/10 (70%); Potgieter 2/4 (50%); 1 Goal Shots; Potgieter 31/33 (94%); Horjus 10/11 (91%)	Stats	2 Goal Shots; Dwan 1/6 (17%); 1 Goal Shots; Aiken 45/52 (87%); Dwan 14/15 (93%)

=== Round 12 ===
Sat 12 Sep	West Coast Fever	80–71	New South Wales Swifts	Nissan Arena
1.00pm	2 Goal Shots; Teague-Neeld 4/6 (67%); Fowler 1/1 (100%); 1 Goal Shots; Fowler 68/71 (96%); Teague-Neeld 2/4 (50%)	Stats	2 Goal Shots; Wallace 10/15 (67%); Garbin 5/10 (50%); 1 Goal Shots; Wallace 25/25 (100%); Garbin 13/18 (72%); Haythornthwaite 3/4 (75%)

Sat 12 Sep	Collingwood Magpies	53–61	Melbourne Vixens	Nissan Arena
3.00pm	2 Goal Shots; Sinclair 2/4 (50%); Allen 12; 1 Goal Shots; Nelson 43/44 (98%); Sinclair 4/5 (80%)	Stats	2 Goal Shots; Thwaites 2/2 (100%); Kumwnenda 2/3 (67%); 1 Goal Shots; Philip 22/26 (85%); Thwaites 19/20 (95%); Kumwenda 12/13 (92%)

Sun 13 Sep	Sunshine Coast Lightning	75–67	Queensland Firebirds	USC Stadium
1.00pm	2 Goal Shots; Wood 5/6 (83%); 1 Goal Shots; Koenen 41/41 (100%); Wood 14/18 (78%); Proscovia 10/11 (91%)	Stats	2 Goal Shots; Dwan 5/12 (42%); Aiken 1/1 (100%); 1 Goal Shots; Aiken 46/51 (90%); Dwan 6/9 (67%); Stower 3/3 (100%)

Sun 13 Sep	Adelaide Thunderbirds	54–64	Giants Netball	Priceline Stadium
3.00pm	2 Goal Shots; Horjus 3/9 (33%); 1 Goal Shots; Potgieter 41/46 (89%); Glasgow 5/7 (71%); Horjus 2/2 (100%)	Stats	2 Goal Shots; Austin 4/9 (44%); Harten 2/4 (50%); 1 Goal Shots; Austin 26/32 (81%); Harten 26/33 (79%)

=== Round 13 ===
Wed 16 Sep	Collingwood Magpies	53–63	Sunshine Coast Lightning	Townsville Entertainment Centre
7.30pm	2 Goal Shots; Sinclair 3/6 (50%); 1 Goal Shots; Nelson 40/44 (91%); Sinclair 7/9 (78%)	Stats	2 Goal Shots; Wood 4/5 (80%); 1 Goal Shots; Koenen 41/45 (91%); Proscovia 8/9 (89%); Wood 6/7 (86%)

Sat 19 Sep	West Coast Fever	71–66	Giants Netball	Cairns Pop Up Arena
1.00pm	2 Goal Shots; Stanton 2/6 (33%); Fowler 1/1 (100%); 1 Goal Shots; Fowler 62/65 (95%); Stanton 3/4 (75%)	Stats	2 Goal Shots; Harten 5/10 (50%); Austin 4/8 (50%); 1 Goal Shots; Harten 24/28 (86%); Austin 24/35 (69%)

Sat 19 Sep	Adelaide Thunderbirds	54–57	New South Wales Swifts	Cairns Pop Up Arena
3.00pm	2 Goal Shots; Gooden 4/10 (40%); Horjus 3/4 (75%); 1 Goal Shots; Potgieter 33/34 (97%); Gooden 6/9 (67%); Horjus 1/1 (100%)	Stats	2 Goal Shots; Wallace 1/3 (33%); 1 Goal Shots; Wallace 25/28 (89%); Housby 22/23 (96%); Garbin 8/9 (89%)

Sun 20 Sep	Melbourne Vixens	58–64	Queensland Firebirds	Cairns Pop Up Arena
1.00pm	2 Goal Shots; Kumwenda 3/5 (60%); Thwaites 7/7 (100%); Philip 1/2 (50%); 1 Goal Shots; Kumwenda 19/19 (100%); Thwaites 10/11 (91%); Philip 7/8 (88%)	Stats	2 Goal Shots; Dwan 3/6 (50%); 1 Goal Shots; Aitken 45/51 (88%); Dwan 13/17 (76%)

=== Round 14 ===
Sat 26 Sep	Collingwood Magpies	63–65	Queensland Firebirds	Nissan Arena
1.00pm	2 Goal Shots; Sinclair 6/10 (60%); 1 Goal Shots; Nelson 42/43 (98%); Sinclair 9/12 (75%)	Stats	2 Goal Shots; Dwan 3/5 (60%); Aiken 1/1 (100%); 1 Goal Shots; Aiken 47/52 (90%); Dwan 10/13 (77%)

Sat 26 Sep	New South Wales Swifts	77–77	Giants Netball	Nissan Arena
3.00pm	2 Goal Shots; Wallace 6/9 (67%); Garbin 3/5 (60%); 1 Goal Shots; Wallace 44/47 (94%); Garbin 15/16 (94%)	Stats	2 Goal Shots; Harten 10/13 (77%); Austin 7/10 (70%); 1 Goal Shots; Harten 24/26 (92%); Austin 19/23 (83%)

Sat 26 Sep	West Coast Fever	63–64	Adelaide Thunderbirds	Nissan Arena
7.30pm	2 Goal Shots; Teague-Neeld 1/3 (33%); 1 Goal Shots; Fowler 54/58 (93%); Stanton 4/4 (100%); Teague-Neeld 3/8 (38%)	Stats	2 Goal Shots; Horjus 8/9 (89%); Gooden 1/4 (25%); 1 Goal Shots 'Potgieter 34/36 (94%); Horjus 10/15 (67%); Gooden 2/3 (67%)

Sun 27 Sep	Sunshine Coast Lightning	54–58	Melbourne Vixens	USC Stadium
1.00pm	2 Goal Shots; Wood 5/9 (56%); Koenen 1/2 (50%); 1 Goal Shots; Koenen 21/25 (84%); Wood 11/13 (85%); Proscovia 10/13 (77%)	Stats	2 Goal Shots; Kumwenda 1/1 (100%); 1 Goal Shots; Kumwenda 42/43 (98%); Thwaites 11/12 (92%); Philip 3/4 (75%)

== Ladder ==
2020 Suncorp Super Netball ladder
Pos	Team	P	W	D	L	GF	GA	%	PTS
1	Melbourne Vixens	14	11	1	2	870	769	113.33	46
2	Sunshine Coast Lightning	14	9	0	5	821	824	99.64	36
3	West Coast Fever	14	8	1	5	964	897	107.46	34
4	New South Wales Swifts	14	8	1	5	898	885	101.46	34
5	Queensland Firebirds	14	6	1	7	851	893	95.29	26
6	Giants Netball	14	5	2	7	885	891	99.32	24
7	Adelaide Thunderbirds	14	5	0	9	769	797	96.48	20
8	Collingwood Magpies	14	1	0	13	770	872	88.30	4
Last updated: 29 September 2020 — Source

== Finals Series ==
=== Major Semi Final ===
Sat 3 Oct; 1.00pm	Report; Stats	Melbourne Vixens (1)	63–47	Sunshine Coast Lightning (2)	USC Stadium; Umpires: Bronwen Adams, Michelle Phippard	Nine
Sat 3 Oct; 1.00pm	Report; Stats	Scoring by quarter: 18-13, 16-7, 16-10, 13-17			USC Stadium; Umpires: Bronwen Adams, Michelle Phippard	Nine
Sat 3 Oct; 1.00pm	Report; Stats	Scoring by half: 34-20, 29-27			USC Stadium; Umpires: Bronwen Adams, Michelle Phippard	Nine
Sat 3 Oct; 1.00pm	Report; Stats	2 Goal Shots; Thwaites 5/7 (71%); Kumwenda 0/1 (0%); Philip 0/3 (0%); 1 Goal Shots; Thwaites 20/21 (95%); Kumwenda 31/31 (100%); Philip 2/3 (67%)		2 Goal Shots; Koenen 1/2 (50%); Wood 3/7 (43%); 1 Goal Shots; Koenen 23/25 (92%); Wood 16/16 (100%); Proscovia 0/1 (0%)	USC Stadium; Umpires: Bronwen Adams, Michelle Phippard	Nine

=== Minor Semi Final ===
Sun 4 Oct; 12.00pm	Report; Stats	West Coast Fever (3)	67–62	New South Wales Swifts (4)	USC Stadium; Umpires: Georgina Sulley-Beales, Nathan Begley	Nine
Sun 4 Oct; 12.00pm	Report; Stats	Scoring by quarter: 15-17, 14-19, 19-12, 19-14			USC Stadium; Umpires: Georgina Sulley-Beales, Nathan Begley	Nine
Sun 4 Oct; 12.00pm	Report; Stats	Scoring by half: 29-36, 38-26			USC Stadium; Umpires: Georgina Sulley-Beales, Nathan Begley	Nine
Sun 4 Oct; 12.00pm	Report; Stats	2 Goal Shots; Fowler 0/1 (0%); Teague-Neeld 2/5 (40%); 1 Goal Shots; Fowler 55/55 (100%); Teague-Neeld 8/12 (67%)		2 Goal Shots; Wallace 6/9 (67%); Housby 2/3 (67%); 1 Goal Shots; Wallace 34/35 (97%); Housby 10/14 (71%); Garbin 2/3 (67%)	USC Stadium; Umpires: Georgina Sulley-Beales, Nathan Begley	Nine

=== Preliminary Final ===
Sun 11 Oct; 12.00pm	Report; Stats	Sunshine Coast Lightning (2)	59–73	West Coast Fever (3)	USC Stadium; Umpires: Georgina Sulley-Beales, Nathan Begley	Nine
Sun 11 Oct; 12.00pm	Report; Stats	Scoring by quarter: 12-21, 11-18, 18-20, 18-14			USC Stadium; Umpires: Georgina Sulley-Beales, Nathan Begley	Nine
Sun 11 Oct; 12.00pm	Report; Stats	Scoring by half: 23-39, 36-34			USC Stadium; Umpires: Georgina Sulley-Beales, Nathan Begley	Nine
Sun 11 Oct; 12.00pm	Report; Stats	2 Goal Shots; Wood 8/12 (67%); 1 Goal Shots; Wood 13/17 (76%); Proscovia 16/18 (89%); Koenen 14/14 (100%)		2 Goal Shots; Fowler 0/1 (0%); Teague-Neeld 3/4 (75%); 1 Goal Shots; Fowler 60/61 (98%); Teague-Neeld 7/14 (50%)	USC Stadium; Umpires: Georgina Sulley-Beales, Nathan Begley	Nine

=== Grand Final ===
Sun 18 Oct; 12.00pm	Report; Stats	Melbourne Vixens (1)	66–64	West Coast Fever (3)	Nissan Arena; Attendance: 2,061; Umpires: Georgina Sulley-Beales, Nathan Begley	Nine
Sun 18 Oct; 12.00pm	Report; Stats	Scoring by quarter: 15-16, 17-17, 18-14, 16-17			Nissan Arena; Attendance: 2,061; Umpires: Georgina Sulley-Beales, Nathan Begley	Nine
Sun 18 Oct; 12.00pm	Report; Stats	Scoring by half: 32-33, 34-31			Nissan Arena; Attendance: 2,061; Umpires: Georgina Sulley-Beales, Nathan Begley	Nine
Sun 18 Oct; 12.00pm	Report; Stats	2 Goal Shots; Thwaites 3/7 (43%); 1 Goal Shots; Kumwenda 47/50 (94%); Thwaites 10/10 (100%); Philip 3/3 (100%)		2 Goal Shots; Teague-Neeld 4/5 (80%); Fowler 1/1 (100%); 1 Goal Shots; Fowler 44/45 (98%); Teague-Neeld 4/5 (80%)	Nissan Arena; Attendance: 2,061; Umpires: Georgina Sulley-Beales, Nathan Begley	Nine
Sun 18 Oct; 12.00pm	Report; Stats	Grand Final MVP: Mwai Kumwenda			Nissan Arena; Attendance: 2,061; Umpires: Georgina Sulley-Beales, Nathan Begley	Nine

== Awards ==
The following players, coaches and umpires were awarded by Netball Australia for performances in the 2020 season:

- The Player of the Year Award was won by Jhaniele Fowler of the West Coast Fever.
- The Grand Final MVP Award was won by Mwai Kumwenda of the Melbourne Vixens.
- The Rising Star Award was won by Maisie Nankivell of the Adelaide Thunderbirds.
- The Joyce Brown Coach of the Year award was won by Simone McKinnis of the Melbourne Vixens.
- The Lorna McConchie Umpire of the Year award was won by Georgina Sulley-Beales of South Australia.
- The Leading Goalscorer Award was won by Jhaniele Fowler of the West Coast Fever, who scored 795 points in the regular season.
- The following players were named in the Super Netball Team of the Year:

Attackers

- Goal Shooter: Jhaniele Fowler
  (West Coast Fever)
- Goal Attack: Kiera Austin
  (Giants Netball)

Midcourters

- Wing Attack: Liz Watson
  (Melbourne Vixens)
- Centre: Kate Moloney
  (Melbourne Vixens)
- Wing Defence: Gabi Simpson
  (Queensland Firebirds)

Defenders

- Goal Defence: Karla Pretorius
  (Sunshine Coast Lightning)
- Goal Keeper: Geva Mentor
  (Collingwood Magpies)

Reserves

- Attack Reserve: Cara Koenen
  (Sunshine Coast Lightning)
- Midcourt Reserve: Paige Hadley
  (New South Wales Swifts)
- Defence Reserve: Shamera Sterling
  (Adelaide Thunderbirds)
