= 2019 Suncorp Super Netball season =

- League: Suncorp Super Netball
- Sport: Netball
- Duration: 27 April – 15 September 2019
- Teams: 8
- TV partner: Nine Network
- Streaming partner: Telstra TV

Regular season
- Minor premiers: Sunshine Coast Lightning
- Season MVP: Jhaniele Fowler
- Top scorer: Jhaniele Fowler (709 goals)

Finals
- Champions: New South Wales Swifts
- Runners-up: Sunshine Coast Lightning
- Grand Final MVP: Samantha Wallace

Seasons
- ← 2018 2020 →

The 2019 Suncorp Super Netball season was the third season of the premier netball league in Australia. The season began on 27 April and concluded on 15 September 2019, however it was suspended for most of the month of July due to the Netball World Cup, which was played in Liverpool.

The New South Wales Swifts won the premiership, defeating two-time defending premiers Sunshine Coast Lightning by 17 goals in the Grand Final at the Brisbane Entertainment Centre.

== Overview ==
=== Teams ===
Team	Leaders	Coach	Home Courts	Ref.
Adelaide Thunderbirds	Chelsea Pitman & Layla Guscoth	Tania Obst	Priceline Stadium; Adelaide Entertainment Centre; Territory Netball Stadium	
Collingwood Magpies	Madison Browne & Geva Mentor	Rob Wright	Melbourne Arena; Bendigo Stadium; Silverdome	
GIANTS Netball	Kimberlee Green	Julie Fitzgerald	Qudos Bank Arena; QuayCentre; AIS Arena	
Melbourne Vixens	Kate Moloney	Simone McKinnis	Melbourne Arena; Margaret Court Arena	
New South Wales Swifts	Maddy Proud	Briony Akle	Qudos Bank Arena; QuayCentre	
Queensland Firebirds	Gabi Simpson	Roselee Jencke	Queensland State Netball Centre	
Sunshine Coast Lightning	Laura Langman	Noeline Taurua	University of Sunshine Coast Stadium; Brisbane Entertainment Centre	
West Coast Fever	Courtney Bruce	Stacey Marinkovich	RAC Arena	

=== Format ===
The season is played over fourteen rounds, allowing every team to play each other twice, once at home and once away. The top four teams on the ladder at the conclusion of the regular season qualify for the finals series. In the first week of the finals series, the 1st ranked team hosts the 2nd ranked team in the major semi-final (with the winner of that match to qualify for the Grand Final) and the 3rd ranked team hosts the 4th ranked team in the minor semi-final (with the loser of that match eliminated). The loser of the major semi-final then hosts the winner of the minor semi-final in the preliminary final. The winner of the major semi-final then hosts the winner of the preliminary final in the Grand Final.

== Player transfers ==
At the start of Super Netball in 2017, all players were contracted for a maximum of two years in line with the initial collective bargaining agreement negotiated by the players' association. Clubs were free to re-sign existing players in the last few weeks of the 2018 season, before the transfer window opened for unimpeded acquisitions at the end of the season. Clubs were given until 25 September 2018 to finalise their rosters for the 2019 season.

=== Arrivals ===
The following table is a list of players who moved clubs/leagues into Super Netball, or were elevated into a permanent position in the senior team, during the off-season. It does not include players who were re-signed by their original Super Netball clubs.

Name	Moving from	Moving to	Ref
(Jamaica) Shamera Sterling	(England) Loughborough Lightning	Adelaide Thunderbirds	
(Australia) Tippah Dwan	(Australia) Queensland Firebirds (training partner)	Queensland Firebirds	
(Australia) Teigan O'Shannassy	(Australia) GIANTS Netball (training partner)	GIANTS Netball	
(Jamaica) Shimona Nelson	(Australia) Adelaide Thunderbirds	Collingwood Magpies	
(New Zealand) Laura Langman	Unattached	Sunshine Coast Lightning	
(England) Natalie Haythornthwaite	(England) Wasps Netball	New South Wales Swifts	
(Australia) Caitlin Bassett	(Australia) Sunshine Coast Lightning	GIANTS Netball	
(Australia) Alice Teague-Neeld	(Australia) Collingwood Magpies	West Coast Fever	
(Australia) Olivia Lewis	(Australia) West Coast Fever (training partner)	West Coast Fever	
(Australia) Caitlin Thwaites	(Australia) Collingwood Magpies	Melbourne Vixens	
(Australia) Kelsey Browne	(Australia) Sunshine Coast Lightning	Collingwood Magpies	
(Australia) Lauren Moore	(Australia) New South Wales Swifts (training partner)	New South Wales Swifts	
(Uganda) Peace Proscovia	(England) Loughborough Lightning	Sunshine Coast Lightning	
(England) Geva Mentor	(Australia) Sunshine Coast Lightning	Collingwood Magpies	
(South Africa) Ine-Marí Venter	(South Africa) Gauteng Jaguars	Melbourne Vixens	
(Australia) Tayla Honey	(Australia) Melbourne Vixens (training partner)	Melbourne Vixens	
(Australia) Cody Lange	(Australia) Collingwood Magpies (training partner)	Adelaide Thunderbirds	
(Australia) Kelly Altmann	Unattached	Adelaide Thunderbirds	
(Australia) Amy Parmenter	(Australia) GIANTS Netball (training partner)	GIANTS Netball	
(Australia) Annika Lee-Jones	(Australia) West Coast Fever	Sunshine Coast Lightning	
(Australia) Gabrielle Sinclair	Unattached	Collingwood Magpies	
(England) Beth Cobden	(England) Loughborough Lightning	Adelaide Thunderbirds	
(Australia) Nat Medhurst	(Australia) West Coast Fever	Collingwood Magpies	
(England) Layla Guscoth	(England) Team Bath	Adelaide Thunderbirds	
(New Zealand) Maria Folau	(New Zealand) Northern Mystics	Adelaide Thunderbirds	
(Australia) Matilda McDonell	Unattached	GIANTS Netball	
(South Africa) Phumza Maweni	(England) Severn Stars	Sunshine Coast Lightning	

=== Departures ===
The following table is a list of players who left Super Netball clubs at the end of the previous season and joined a foreign club. It does not include players who retired from Super Netball at the end of the previous season.

Name	Super Netball team (2018)	New team (2019)	Ref
(England) Serena Guthrie	GIANTS Netball	(England) Team Bath	
(New Zealand) Leana de Bruin	Adelaide Thunderbirds	(New Zealand) Northern Stars	
(Australia) Charlee Hodges	Adelaide Thunderbirds	(New Zealand) Northern Stars	
(Australia) Kristina Brice	GIANTS Netball	(New Zealand) Northern Mystics	
(New Zealand) Erena Mikaere	Sunshine Coast Lightning	(New Zealand) Northern Mystics	
(New Zealand) Abigail Latu-Meafou	Adelaide Thunderbirds	(New Zealand) Waikato Bay of Plenty Magic	
(New Zealand) Cat Tuivaiti	Adelaide Thunderbirds	(Scotland) UWS Sirens	
(Australia) Gia Abernethy	Adelaide Thunderbirds	(Scotland) UWS Sirens	
(South Africa) Bongiwe Msomi	Adelaide Thunderbirds	(England) Wasps Netball	

== Pre-season tournament ==
The league introduced a pre-season tournament for the first time, known as the #TeamGirls Cup. The tournament took place between 8 and 10 March at the newly constructed Queensland State Netball Centre.

The eight Super Netball teams were split into two groups of four and played each of their group opponents once, before playing an inter-group match to determine places from first to eighth. All matches were live-streamed on the Netball Live App and Telstra TV, with the final match between the two top teams broadcast on the Nine Network. The tournament was won by the Collingwood Magpies, who defeated local rivals the Melbourne Vixens by six goals in the final.

=== Pool A Fixtures ===
Pos	Team	Pld	W	D	L	GF	GA	GD	Pts	Qualification
1	Melbourne Vixens	3	3	0	0	125	91	+34	12	Final
2	Sunshine Coast Lightning	3	2	0	1	105	104	+1	8	Classification matches
3	Queensland Firebirds (H)	3	1	0	2	113	126	−13	4	Classification matches
4	Adelaide Thunderbirds	3	0	0	3	83	105	−22	0	Classification matches

Updated to match(es) played on 9 March 2019. Source: SSN
(H) Hosts

8 March 2019; 16:00	Report; Stats	Sunshine Coast Lightning	30 – 26	Adelaide Thunderbirds	Queensland State Netball Centre
8 March 2019; 16:00	Report; Stats	Proscovia 15/16 (94%); Koenan 12/21 (57%); Wood 3/4 (75%)		Glasgow 21/29 (72%); Allen 3/5 (60%); Lange 2/6 (33%)	Queensland State Netball Centre

8 March 2019; 19:00	Report; Stats	Melbourne Vixens	53 – 32	Queensland Firebirds	Queensland State Netball Centre
8 March 2019; 19:00	Report; Stats	Philip 18/19 (95%); Venter 18/19 (95%); Thwaites 17/17 (100%)		Aiken 19/27 (70%); Tippett 9/12 (75%); Dwan 4/8 (50%)	Queensland State Netball Centre

9 March 2019; 13:00	Report; Stats	Melbourne Vixens	30 – 24	Adelaide Thunderbirds	Queensland State Netball Centre
9 March 2019; 13:00	Report; Stats	Thwaites 15/17 (88%); Venter 13/18 (72%); McDonald 2/7 (29%)		Glasgow 17/22 (77%); Horjus 7/10 (70%); Lange 0/2 (0%); Allen 0/2 (0%)	Queensland State Netball Centre

9 March 2019; 14:00	Report; Stats	Queensland Firebirds	36 – 40	Sunshine Coast Lightning	Queensland State Netball Centre
9 March 2019; 14:00	Report; Stats	Aiken 19/25 (76%); Tippett 17/20 (85%)		Proscovia 25/28 (89%); Koenan 8/9 (89%); Wood 7/9 (78%)	Queensland State Netball Centre

9 March 2019; 19:00	Report; Stats	Sunshine Coast Lightning	35 – 42	Melbourne Vixens	Queensland State Netball Centre
9 March 2019; 19:00	Report; Stats	Proscovia 21/21 (100%); Koenan 13/18 (72%); Wood 1/3 (33%)		Philip 16/17 (94%); Thwaites 13/14 (93%); Venter 13/14 (93%)	Queensland State Netball Centre

9 March 2019; 20:00	Report; Stats	Queensland Firebirds	45 – 33	Adelaide Thunderbirds	Queensland State Netball Centre
9 March 2019; 20:00	Report; Stats	Aiken 25/32 (78%); Tippett 20/24 (83%)		Glasgow 23/28 (82%); Lange 10/11 (91%)	Queensland State Netball Centre

=== Pool B Fixtures ===
Pos	Team	Pld	W	D	L	GF	GA	GD	Pts	Qualification
1	Collingwood Magpies	3	2	0	1	128	103	+25	8	Final
2	Giants Netball	3	2	0	1	119	112	+7	8	Classification matches
3	New South Wales Swifts	3	2	0	1	105	108	−3	8	Classification matches
4	West Coast Fever	3	0	0	3	80	109	−29	0	Classification matches

Updated to match(es) played on 9 March 2019. Source: SSN

8 March 2019; 17:00	Report; Stats	West Coast Fever	28 – 40	Collingwood Magpies	Queensland State Netball Centre
8 March 2019; 17:00	Report; Stats	Stanton 25/34 (74%); Cosh 3/4 (75%)		Nelson 27/28 (96%); Sinclair 13/15 (87%)	Queensland State Netball Centre

8 March 2019; 18:00	Report; Stats	New South Wales Swifts	47 – 33	Giants Netball	Queensland State Netball Centre
8 March 2019; 18:00	Report; Stats	Housby 20/23 (87%); Wallace 16/19 (84%); Garbin 11/14 (79%)		Harten 22/24 (92%); Marshall 6/8 (75%); Austin 5/8 (63%)	Queensland State Netball Centre

9 March 2019; 11:00	Report; Stats	New South Wales Swifts	29 – 51	Collingwood Magpies	Queensland State Netball Centre
9 March 2019; 11:00	Report; Stats	Wallace 17/21 (81%); Haythornthwaite 6/6 (100%); Garbin 6/8 (75%)		Nelson 33/35 (94%); Sinclair 10/12 (83%); Medhurst 8/10 (80%)	Queensland State Netball Centre

9 March 2019; 12:00	Report; Stats	Giants Netball	40 – 28	West Coast Fever	Queensland State Netball Centre
9 March 2019; 12:00	Report; Stats	Harten 19/21 (90%); Austin 18/25 (72%); Marshall 3/3 (100%)		Stanton 28/35 (80%); Cosh 0/1 (0%)	Queensland State Netball Centre

9 March 2019; 17:00	Report; Stats	West Coast Fever	24 – 29	New South Wales Swifts	Queensland State Netball Centre
9 March 2019; 17:00	Report; Stats	Stanton 17/23 (74%); Cosh 6/7 (86%); Teague-Neeld 1/5 (20%)		Garbin 13/15 (87%); Haythornthwaite 9/14 (64%); Samantha Wallace 7/8 (88%)	Queensland State Netball Centre

9 March 2019; 18:00	Report; Stats	Giants Netball	46 – 37	Collingwood Magpies	Queensland State Netball Centre
9 March 2019; 18:00	Report; Stats	Austin 26/29 (90%); Harten 20/24 (83%)		Nelson 30/31 (97%); Medhurst 7/9 (78%)	Queensland State Netball Centre

=== Finals ===
10 March 2019; 09:30	Report; Stats	Adelaide Thunderbirds	27 – 27	West Coast Fever	Queensland State Netball Centre
10 March 2019; 09:30	Report; Stats	Glasgow 13/14 (93%); Allen 9/12 (75%); Lange 5/10 (50%)		Fowler 15/15 (100%); Stanton 11/17 (65%); Teague-Neeld 1/3 (33%)	Queensland State Netball Centre

10 March 2019; 10:30	Report; Stats	Queensland Firebirds	41 – 42	New South Wales Swifts	Queensland State Netball Centre
10 March 2019; 10:30	Report; Stats	Aiken 24/30 (80%); Tippett 17/17 (100%)		Wallace 30/30 (100%); Garbin 12/16 (75%)	Queensland State Netball Centre

10 March 2019; 11:30	Report; Stats	Sunshine Coast Lightning	46 – 44	Giants Netball	Queensland State Netball Centre
10 March 2019; 11:30	Report; Stats	Proscovia 23/23 (100%); Wood 16/18 (89%); Koenan 7/8 (88%)		Austin 25/27 (93%); Harten 19/22 (86%)	Queensland State Netball Centre

10 March 2019; 13:30	Report; Stats	Melbourne Vixens	33 – 39	Collingwood Magpies	Queensland State Netball Centre
10 March 2019; 13:30	Report; Stats	Philip 20/22 (91%); Thwaites 9/12 (75%); Venter 4/6 (67%)		Nelson 35/41 (85%); Medhurst 3/7 (43%); Sinclair 1/2 (50%)	Queensland State Netball Centre

Place	Team
Champions	Collingwood Magpies
Runners-up	Melbourne Vixens
Third	Sunshine Coast Lightning
4	Giants Netball
5	New South Wales Swifts
6	Queensland Firebirds
=7	Adelaide Thunderbirds
=7	West Coast Fever

2019 #TeamGirls Cup winners

1st title

== Regular season ==
=== Round 1 ===
Sat 27 Apr	Melbourne Vixens	73 – 61	Queensland Firebirds	Melbourne Arena
3.00pm	Thwaites 50/51 (98%); Philip 23/24 (96%)	Report; Stats	Aiken 36/42 (86%); Tippett 23/24 (96%); Sommerville 2/2 (100%)

Sat 27 Apr	Collingwood Magpies	57 – 43	Sunshine Coast Lightning	Melbourne Arena
5.30pm	Nelson 46/54 (85%); Medhurst 11/15 (73%)	Report; Stats	Koenen 18/21 (86%); Wood 15/22 (68%); Proscovia 10/11 (91%)

Sun 28 Apr	Giants Netball	56 – 63	New South Wales Swifts	Qudos Bank Arena
1.00pm	Bassett 28/36 (78%); Harten 25/31 (81%); Austin 3/3 (100%)	Report; Stats	Wallace 46/49 (94%); Housby 17/26 (65%)

Sun 28 Apr	Adelaide Thunderbirds	61 – 60	West Coast Fever	Priceline Stadium
2.30pm	Glasgow 37/47 (79%); Folau 24/31 (77%)	Report; Stats	Fowler 51/51 (100%); Teague-Neeld 5/10 (50%); Stanton 4/6 (67%)

=== Round 2 ===
Sat 4 May	Queensland Firebirds	57 – 57	Collingwood Magpies	Queensland State Netball Centre
3.00pm	Aiken 31/39 (79%); Tippett 26/27 (96%)	Report; Stats	Nelson 42/47 (89%); Medhurst 10/12 (83%); Sinclair 5/5 (100%)

Sun 5 May	West Coast Fever	55 – 80	Sunshine Coast Lightning	RAC Arena
11.00am	Fowler 51/55 (93%); Stanton 4/6 (67%); Teague-Neeld 0/5 (0%)	Report; Stats	Proscovia 48/54 (89%); Wood 18/20 (90%); Koenen 14/17 (82%)

Sun 5 May	New South Wales Swifts	61 – 43	Adelaide Thunderbirds	QuayCentre
3.00pm	Wallace 31/31 (100%); Housby 24/28 (86%); Garbin 6/6 (100%)	Report; Stats	Glasgow 24/28 (86%); Folau 19/23 (83%); Lange 0/1 (0%)

Sun 5 May	Melbourne Vixens	61 – 45	Giants Netball	Melbourne Arena
5.00pm	Philip 31/38 (82%); Thwaites 30/35 (86%)	Report; Stats	Bassett 35/39 (90%); Harten 10/11 (91%)

=== Round 3 ===
Sat 11 May	Adelaide Thunderbirds	42 – 58	Melbourne Vixens	Priceline Stadium
2.30pm	Glasgow 24/30 (80%); Folau 18/22 (82%)	Report; Stats	Philip 29/29 (100%); Thwaites 29/31 (94%)

Sun 12 May	Sunshine Coast Lightning	71 – 56	Queensland Firebirds	Brisbane Entertainment Centre
1.00pm	Proscovia 53/55 (96%); Wood 18/30 (60%)	Report; Stats	Tippett 40/40 (100%); Aiken 10/15 (67%); Sommerville 6/8 (75%)

Sun 12 May	New South Wales Swifts	80 – 66	West Coast Fever	QuayCentre
1.00pm	Wallace 62/66 (94%); Housby 18/18 (100%)	Report; Stats	Fowler 48/50 (96%); Stanton 18/23 (78%)

Sun 12 May	Giants Netball	58 – 50	Collingwood Magpies	QuayCentre
5.00pm	Bassett 40/42 (95%); Harten 17/25 (68%); Austin 1/2 (50%)	Report; Stats	Nelson 43/50 (86%); Medhurst 6/9 (67%); Sinclair 1/2 (50%)

=== Round 4 ===
Fri 17 May	Collingwood Magpies	65 – 47	Adelaide Thunderbirds	Melbourne Arena
7.00pm	Nelson 52/57 (91%); Medhurst 13/14 (93%)	Report; Stats	Glasgow 16/21 (76%); Folau 30/39 (77%)

Sat 18 May	New South Wales Swifts	57 – 59	Sunshine Coast Lightning	QuayCentre
1.00pm	Wallace 33/36 (92%); Housby 24/26 (92%)	Report; Stats	Proscovia 27/29 (93%); Wood 14/19 (74%); Koenan 18/20 (90%)

Sat 18 May	West Coast Fever	63 – 63	Melbourne Vixens	RAC Arena
6.00pm	Fowler 51/54 (94%); Stanton 12/16 (75%)	Report; Stats	Thwaites 36/43 (84%); Philip 27/30 (90%)

Sun 19 May	Queensland Firebirds	61 – 69	Giants Netball	Queensland State Netball Centre
1.00pm	Aiken 20/28 (71%); Tippett 41/41 (100%)	Report; Stats	Bassett 50/57 (88%); Harten 12/20 (60%); Austin 7/9 (78%)

=== Round 5 ===
Sat 25 May	Collingwood Magpies	61 – 63	West Coast Fever	Bendigo Stadium
3.00pm	Nelson 44/51 (86%); Medhurst 17/21 (81%)	Report; Stats	Fowler 51/52 (98%); Stanton 12/14 (86%)

Sat 25 May	Sunshine Coast Lightning	72 – 61	Giants Netball	USC Stadium
7.00pm	Proscovia 43/48 (90%); Wood 21/24 (88%); Koenan 8/9 (89%)	Report; Stats	Bassett 31/36 (86%); Harten 23/26 (88%); Austin 7/7 (100%)

Sun 26 May	Melbourne Vixens	50 – 60	New South Wales Swifts	Margaret Court Arena
1.00pm	Thwaites 28/32 (88%); Philip 18/22 (82%); Venter 4/4 (100%)	Report; Stats	Wallace 45/47 (96%); Housby 15/18 (83%)

Sun 26 May	Adelaide Thunderbirds	54 – 51	Queensland Firebirds	Priceline Stadium
2.30pm	Glasgow 28/32 (88%); Folau 26/34 (76%)	Report; Stats	Latu-Meafou 18/22 (82%); Tippett 27/28 (96%); Somerville 06/10 (60%)

=== Round 6 ===
Sat 1 Jun	Sunshine Coast Lightning	52 – 62	Melbourne Vixens	USC Stadium
3.00pm	Proscovia 26/28 (93%); Wood 9/12 (75%); Koenan 17/19 (89%)	Report; Stats	Thwaites 33/37 (89%); Philip 26/31 (84%); Venter 3/3 (100%)

Sat 1 Jun	Queensland Firebirds	62 – 62	West Coast Fever	Queensland State Netball Centre
7.00pm	Latu-Meafou 27/32 (84%); Tippett 35/36 (97%)	Report; Stats	Fowler 55/60 (92%); Stanton 7/11 (64%)

Sun 2 Jun	New South Wales Swifts	68 – 52	Collingwood Magpies	Qudos Bank Arena
1.00pm	Wallace 54/57 (95%); Housby 14/19 (74%)	Report; Stats	Nelson 41/44 (93%); Medhurst 9/10 (90%); Sinclair 2/3 (67%)

Sun 2 Jun	Giants Netball	65 – 54	Adelaide Thunderbirds	Qudos Bank Arena
3.00pm	Bassett 32/35 (91%); Harten 33/37 (89%)	Report; Stats	Glasgow 28/33 (85%); Folau 26/30 (87%)

=== Round 7 ===
Sat 8 Jun	Adelaide Thunderbirds	53 – 59	Sunshine Coast Lightning	Territory Netball Stadium
2.30pm	Glasgow 25/29 (86%); Folau 28/32 (88%)	Report; Stats	Proscovia 15/16 (94%); Wood 14/19 (74%); Koenan 30/32 (94%)

Sat 8 Jun	West Coast Fever	62 – 62	Giants Netball	RAC Arena
6.00pm	Fowler 61/65 (94%); Stanton 1/2 (50%)	Report; Stats	Bassett 42/46 (91%); Harten 20/27 (74%)

Sun 9 Jun	Queensland Firebirds	46 – 68	New South Wales Swifts	Queensland State Netball Centre
1.00pm	Potgieter 24/24 (100%); Tippett 17/18 (94%); Latu-Meafou 5/7 (71%)	Report; Stats	Wallace 41/44 (93%); Housby 27/31 (87%)

Mon 10 Jun	Melbourne Vixens	52 – 55	Collingwood Magpies	Melbourne Arena
12.00pm	Thwaites 31/32 (97%); Philip 19/24 (79%); Venter 2/3 (67%)	Report; Stats	Nelson 48/54 (89%); Medhurst 7/9 (78%)

=== Round 8 ===
Sat 15 Jun	Sunshine Coast Lightning	64 – 41	Collingwood Magpies	USC Stadium
3.00pm	Proscovia 45/50 (90%); Wood 15/22 (68%); Koenan 4/5 (80%)	Report; Stats	Nelson 29/36 (81%); Medhurst 8/14 (57%); Sinclair 4/6 (67%)

Sat 15 Jun	West Coast Fever	53 – 52	Adelaide Thunderbirds	RAC Arena
6.00pm	Fowler 47/48 (98%); Teague-Neeld 5/10 (50%); Stanton 1/3 (33%)	Report; Stats	Folau 33/38 (87%); Glasgow 19/22 (86%)

Sun 16 Jun	Queensland Firebirds	60 – 71	Melbourne Vixens	Queensland State Netball Centre
1.00pm	Potgieter 31/34 (91%); Tippett 29/31 (94%)	Report; Stats	Thwaites 43/47 (91%); Philip 28/33 (85%)

Sun 16 Jun	New South Wales Swifts	59 – 55	Giants Netball	Qudos Bank Arena
3.00pm	Wallace 48/50 (96%); Housby 11/12 (92%)	Report; Stats	Bassett 34/36 (94%); Harten 21/24 (88%)

=== Round 9 ===
Sat 22 Jun	Sunshine Coast Lightning	65 – 57	West Coast Fever	USC Stadium
3.00pm	Proscovia 44/45 (98%); Wood 21/25 (84%)	Report; Stats	Fowler 45/47 (96%); Stanton 9/16 (56%); Teague-Neeld 3/5 (60%)

Sat 22 Jun	Giants Netball	57 – 66	Melbourne Vixens	QuayCentre
7.00pm	Harten 24/27 (89%); Bassett 20/22 (91%); Austin 13/14 (93%)	Report; Stats	Thwaites 40/42 (95%); Philip 26/29 (90%)

Sun 23 Jun	Adelaide Thunderbirds	51 – 51	New South Wales Swifts	Adelaide Entertainment Centre
12.30pm	Folau 26/36 (72%); Glasgow 23/25 (92%); Hodges 2/2 (100%)	Report; Stats	Garbin 25/29 (86%); Housby 21/26 (81%); Wallace 5/7 (71%)

Sun 23 Jun	Collingwood Magpies	63 – 50	Queensland Firebirds	Melbourne Arena
3.00pm	Nelson 45/50 (90%); Medhurst 18/18 (100%)	Report; Stats	Potgieter 29/36 (81%); Tippett 19/22 (86%); Aiken 2/2 (100%)

=== Round 10 ===
Sat 27 Jul	Queensland Firebirds	64 – 66	Sunshine Coast Lightning	Queensland State Netball Centre
3.00pm	Aiken 30/32 (94%); Tippett 30/31 (97%); Potgieter 4/5 (80%)	Report; Stats	Koenen 37/40 (93%); Wood 26/29 (90%); Proscovia 3/3 (100%)

Sat 27 Jul	West Coast Fever	49 – 53	New South Wales Swifts	RAC Arena
6.00pm	Fowler 43/47 (91%); Teague-Neeld 6/12 (50%)	Report; Stats	Wallace 24/29 (83%); Housby 22/28 (79%); Garbin 7/8 (88%)

Sun 28 Jul	Collingwood Magpies	56 – 63	Giants Netball	Melbourne Arena
1.00pm	Nelson 40/46 (87%); Sinclair 11/15 (73%); Medhurst 5/7 (71%)	Report; Stats	Bassett 35/38 (92%); Harten 23/27 (85%); Austin 5/9 (56%)

Sun 28 Jul	Melbourne Vixens	63 – 57	Adelaide Thunderbirds	Melbourne Arena
3.30pm	Philip 33/40 (83%); Thwaites 30/33 (91%)	Report; Stats	Ryde 28/30 (93%); Glasgow 28/32 (88%); Lange 1/4 (25%)

=== Round 11 ===
Sat 3 Aug	Melbourne Vixens	64 – 52	West Coast Fever	Melbourne Arena
3.00pm	Philip 29/32 (91%); Thwaites 32/33 (97%); Kumwenda 3/3 (100%)	Report; Stats	Fowler 44/47 (94%); Teague-Neeld 06/11 (55%); Friday 2/2 (100%)

Sat 3 Aug	Sunshine Coast Lightning	50 – 48	New South Wales Swifts	USC Stadium
7.00pm	Koenen 26/30 (87%); Wood 13/20 (65%); Proscovia 11/11 (100%)	Report; Stats	Garbin 12/15 (80%); Wallace 36/37 (97%)

Sun 4 Aug	Giants Netball	63 – 57	Queensland Firebirds	AIS Arena
1.00pm	Bassett 30/32 (94%); Harten 33/39 (85%)	Report; Stats	Aiken 30/36 (83%); Tippett 23/23 (100%); PLatu-Meafou 4/5 (80%)

Sun 4 Aug	Adelaide Thunderbirds	46 – 46	Collingwood Magpies	Priceline Stadium
2.30pm	Ryde 20/22 (91%); Glasgow 11/15 (73%); Folau 15/19 (79%)	Report; Stats	Nelson 45/50 (90%); Medhurst 18/18 (100%)

=== Round 12 ===
Sat 10 Aug	Giants Netball	56 – 60	Sunshine Coast Lightning	QuayCentre
3.00pm	Bassett 36/40 (90%); Harten 16/25 (64%); Austin 4/39 (10%)	Report; Stats	Koenen 14/15 (93%); Wood 21/27 (78%); Proscovia 25/25 (100%)

Sat 10 Aug	New South Wales Swifts	57 – 51	Melbourne Vixens	QuayCentre
7.00pm	Garbin 12/18 (67%); Wallace 45/49 (92%)	Report; Stats	Philip 24/30 (80%); Thwaites 9/11 (82%); Kumwenda 18/20 (90%)

Sun 11 Aug	Queensland Firebirds	59 – 71	Adelaide Thunderbirds	Queensland State Netball Centre
1.00pm	Aiken 38/39 (97%); Tippett 21/25 (84%)	Report; Stats	Folau 35/38 (92%); Glasgow 36/37 (97%)

Mon 12 Aug	West Coast Fever	57 – 63	Collingwood Magpies	RAC Arena
7.00pm	Fowler 54/60 (90%); Teague-Neeld 3/8 (38%)	Report; Stats	Nelson 43/50 (86%); Sinclair 6/7 (86%); Medhurst 14/17 (82%)

=== Round 13 ===
Sat 17 Aug	Collingwood Magpies	64 – 56	New South Wales Swifts	Silverdome
3.00pm	Nelson 52/54 (96%); Medhurst 12/14 (86%)	Report; Stats	Wallace 39/43 (91%); Haythornthwaite 9/10 (90%); Garbin 8/10 (80%)

Sun 18 Aug	Adelaide Thunderbirds	40 – 54	Giants Netball	Priceline Stadium
12.30pm	Folau 18/22 (82%); Ryde 18/19 (95%); Glasgow 4/6 (67%); Pitman 0/1 (0%)	Report; Stats	Bassett 32/38 (84%); Harten 22/28 (79%)

Sun 18 Aug	Melbourne Vixens	55 – 56	Sunshine Coast Lightning	Melbourne Arena
3.00pm	Philip 26/33 (79%); Thwaites 24/26 (92%); Kumwenda 5/7 (71%)	Report; Stats	Proscovia 33/34 (97%); Koenen 14/16 (88%); Wood 9/13 (69%)

Sun 18 Aug	West Coast Fever	62 – 68	Queensland Firebirds	RAC Arena
3.00pm	Fowler 58/65 (89%); Teague-Neeld 4/7 (57%)	Report; Stats	Tippett 30/30 (100%); Potgieter 19/21 (90%); Aiken 19/22 (86%)

=== Round 14 ===
Sat 24 Aug	Giants Netball	70 – 60	West Coast Fever	Qudos Bank Arena
3.00pm	Bassett 47/50 (94%); Harten 23/29 (79%)	Report; Stats	Fowler 50/52 (96%); Teague-Neeld 5/7 (71%); Stanton 5/7 (71%)

Sat 24 Aug	New South Wales Swifts	64 – 63	Queensland Firebirds	Qudos Bank Arena
5.00pm	Wallace 43/45 (96%); Housby 16/18 (89%); Garbin 5/5 (100%)	Report; Stats	Tippett 33/35 (94%); Aiken 30/35 (86%)

Sat 24 Aug	Sunshine Coast Lightning	58 – 37	Adelaide Thunderbirds	USC Stadium
7.00pm	Koenen 30/32 (94%); Wood 22/25 (88%); Proscovia 6/8 (75%)	Report; Stats	Folau 33/39 (85%); Lange 3/8 (38%); Hodges 1/3 (33%)

Sun 25 Aug	Collingwood Magpies	58 – 47	Melbourne Vixens	Melbourne Arena
1.00pm	Nelson 42/47 (89%); Medhurst 16/17 (94%)	Report; Stats	Thaaites 21/23 (91%); Philip 21/25 (84%); Kumwenda 5/5 (100%)

== Ladder ==
2019 Suncorp Super Netball ladder
Pos	Team	P	W	D	L	GF	GA	%	BP	PTS
1	Sunshine Coast Lightning	14	12	0	2	855	759	112.65	33	81
2	New South Wales Swifts	14	10	1	3	845	755	111.92	36	78
3	Melbourne Vixens	14	8	1	5	836	775	107.87	29	63
4	Collingwood Magpies	14	7	2	5	788	771	102.20	27	59
5	Giants Netball	14	7	1	6	834	821	101.58	29	59
6	West Coast Fever	14	2	3	9	821	904	90.82	18	33
7	Adelaide Thunderbirds	14	3	2	9	708	803	88.17	14	30
8	Queensland Firebirds	14	1	2	11	815	914	89.17	18	26
Last updated: 25 August 2019 — Source

== Finals Series ==
=== Major Semi Final ===
Sat 31 Aug; 3.00pm	Report; Stats	Sunshine Coast Lightning	58–48	New South Wales Swifts	USC Stadium	Nine
Sat 31 Aug; 3.00pm	Report; Stats	Scoring by quarter: 13–14, 14–11, 18–10, 13–13			USC Stadium	Nine
Sat 31 Aug; 3.00pm	Report; Stats	Koenen 30/32 (94%); Wood 22/29 (76%); Proscovia 6/7 (86%)		Housby 16/18 (89%); Garbin 16/18 (89%); Wallace 16/19 (84%)	USC Stadium	Nine

=== Minor Semi Final ===
Sun 1 Sep; 1.00pm	Report; Stats	Melbourne Vixens	62–49	Collingwood Magpies	State Netball and Hockey Centre	Nine
Sun 1 Sep; 1.00pm	Report; Stats	Scoring by quarter: 20–9, 14–10, 12–14, 16–16			State Netball and Hockey Centre	Nine
Sun 1 Sep; 1.00pm	Report; Stats	Thwaites 29/33 (88%); Philip 29/36 (81%); Kumwenda 4/5 (80%)		Nelson 42/46 (91%); Medhurst 7/9 (78%); Sinclair 0/1 (0%)	State Netball and Hockey Centre	Nine

=== Preliminary Final ===
Sun 8 Sep; 1.00pm	Report; Stats	New South Wales Swifts	60–47	Melbourne Vixens	Quaycentre	Nine
Sun 8 Sep; 1.00pm	Report; Stats	Scoring by quarter: 19–12, 14–10, 11–15, 16–10			Quaycentre	Nine
Sun 8 Sep; 1.00pm	Report; Stats	Wallace 40/42 (95%); Housby 19/21 (90%); Garbin 1/1 (100%)		Kumwenda 22/26 (85%); Philip 21/25 (84%); Thwaites 4/7 (57%)	Quaycentre	Nine

=== Grand Final ===
Sun 15 Sep; 1.00pm	Report; Stats	Sunshine Coast Lightning	47–64	New South Wales Swifts	Brisbane Entertainment Centre	Nine
Sun 15 Sep; 1.00pm	Report; Stats	Scoring by quarter: 12–16, 11–15, 13–15, 11–18			Brisbane Entertainment Centre	Nine
Sun 15 Sep; 1.00pm	Report; Stats	Koenen 23/27 (85%); Proscovia 16/18 (89%); Wood 8/14 (57%)		Wallace 40/44 (91%); Housby 18/22 (82%); Garbin 6/7 (86%)	Brisbane Entertainment Centre	Nine
Sun 15 Sep; 1.00pm	Report; Stats	Grand Final MVP: Samantha Wallace			Brisbane Entertainment Centre	Nine

== Nissan Net Points Team of the Week ==
Round	GS	GA	WA	C	WD	GD	GK
Round 1	J.Fowler (WCF)	J.Harten (GIA)	P.Hadley (NSW)	M.Proud (NSW)	J.Anstiss (WCF)	K.Pretorius (SCL)	S.Sterling (ADE)
Round 2	J. Fowler (WCF)	S.Wood (SCL)	L.Scherian (SCL)	K.Moloney (VIX)	A.Brazill (MAG)	K.Pretorius (SCL)	E.Mannix (VIX)
Round 3	S.Wallace (NSW)	H.Housby (NSW)	I.Colyer (WCF)	P.Hadley (NSW)	R.Ingles (VIX)	K.Pretorius (SCL)	S.Sterling (ADE)
Round 4	S.Nelson (MAG)	K.Stanton (WCF)	L.Watson (VIX)	P.Hadley (NSW)	A.Brazill (MAG)	K.Pretorius (SCL)	S.Sterling (ADE)
Round 5	P.Proscovia (SCL)	N.Medhurst (MAG)	M.Proud (NSW)	L.Langman (SCL)	G.Simpson (FIR)	K.Pretorius (SCL)	S.Sterling (ADE)
Round 6	J.Fowler (WCF)	H.Housby (NSW)	C.Nevins (FIR)	J.Price (GIA)	A.Parmenter (GIA)	T.Hinchliffe (FIR)	C.Bruce (WCF)
Round 7	J.Fowler (WCF)	H.Housby (NSW)	M.Proud (NSW)	P.Hadley (NSW)	R.Ingles (VIX)	K.Pretorius (SCL)	G.Mentor (MAG)
Round 8	P.Proscovia (SCL)	H.Housby (NSW)	C.Pitman (ADE)	J.Price (GIA)	A.Brazill (MAG)	K.Pretorius (SCL)	P.Maweni (SCL)
Round 9	P.Proscovia (SCL)	N.Medhurst (MAG)	L.Watson (VIX)	K.Moloney (VIX)	A.Parmenter (GIA)	M.Turner (NSW)	S.Sterling (ADE)
Round 10	C.Koenan (SCL)	S.Wood (SCL)	K.Browne (MAG)	J.Price (GIA)	A.Brazill (MAG)	K.Manu'a (GIA)	S.Sterling (ADE)
Round 11	C.Bassett (GIA)	G.Tippett (FIR)	L.Watson (VIX)	K.Moloney (VIX)	A.Brazill (MAG)	K.Pretorius (SCL)	S.Sterling (ADE)
Round 12	S.Wallace (NSW)	N.Medhurst (MAG)	L.Scherian (SCL)	A.Brazill (MAG)	G.Simpson (FIR)	K.Pretorius (SCL)	S.Sterling (ADE)
Round 13	J. Fowler (WCF)	G.Tippett (FIR)	C.Nevins (FIR)	A.Brazill (MAG)	A.Parmenter (GIA)	K.Pretorius (SCL)	S.Sterling (ADE)
Round 14	C.Bassett (GIA)	G.Tippett (FIR)	C.Nevins (FIR)	J.Price (GIA)	J.Anstiss (WCF)	K.Pretorius (SCL)	S.Sterling (ADE)

== Awards ==
The following players, coaches and umpires were awarded by Netball Australia for performances in the 2019 season:

- The Player of the Year Award was won by Jhaniele Fowler of the West Coast Fever.
- The Grand Final MVP Award was won by Samantha Wallace of the New South Wales Swifts.
- The Rising Star Award was won by Amy Parmenter of GIANTS Netball.
- The Joyce Brown Coach of the Year award was won by Briony Akle of the New South Wales Swifts.
- The Lorna McConchie Umpire of the Year award was won by Michelle Phippard of New South Wales.
- The Leading Goalscorer Award was won by Jhaniele Fowler of the West Coast Fever, who scored 709 goals in the regular season.
- The following players were named in the Super Netball Team of the Year:

Attackers

- Goal Shooter: Jhaniele Fowler
  (West Coast Fever)
- Goal Attack: Gretel Tippett
  (Queensland Firebirds)

Midcourters

- Wing Attack: Liz Watson
  (Melbourne Vixens)
- Centre: Kate Moloney
  (Melbourne Vixens)
- Wing Defence: Renae Ingles
  (Melbourne Vixens)

Defenders

- Goal Defence: Karla Pretorius
  (Sunshine Coast Lightning)
- Goal Keeper: Emily Mannix
  (Melbourne Vixens)

Reserves

- Attack Reserve: Samantha Wallace
  (New South Wales Swifts)
- Midcourt Reserve: Ashleigh Brazill
  (Collingwood Magpies)
- Defence Reserve: Shamera Sterling
  (Adelaide Thunderbirds)
