= Melanie Groves =

Australian netball player

Personal information
- Full name: Melanie Groves (Née: McKenzie)
- Born: 6 October 1979 (age 46)
- Height: 1.90 m (6 ft 3 in)
- Spouse: Frazier Robertson
- Children: Tiggi Groves, Tucker Groves, Sully Groves

Netball career
- Playing positions: GK, GD
Years	Club team	Apps
2003–07	Queensland Firebirds	
- Updated on 2009-03-16

Melanie Groves (née McKenzie; born 6 October 1979) is a retired Australian international netball player. Groves played five years with the Queensland Firebirds in the Commonwealth Bank Trophy. In the 2007 season, Groves and fellow Queensland player Peta Stephens refused to sign new player contracts with Netball Queensland, preferring their old contracts and representation by the Australian Netball Players' Association. Groves went on to complete the 2007 season, but retired at the end of that year because she was having her first child (Tiggi Groves).
