= Michelle Hess =

South African netball player (born 1984)

Personal information
- Born: 21 September 1984 (age 42) Cape Town, South Africa

Netball career
- Playing position: Shooter
Years	Club team	Apps
up to 2007	Queensland Firebirds	
Years	National team	Caps
2005	South Africa U21	
- Updated on 2009-03-19

Michelle Hess (born 21 September 1984 in Northern Cape Town) is a South African netball player. Having played with the Queensland Firebirds in the Commonwealth Bank Trophy in Australia, Hess has been confirmed as a member of the Queensland Fusion in the 2008 Australian Netball League. She also represented South Africa at the 2005 World Youth Netball Championships in Florida.
