= Sam Wallace =

Sam Wallace may refer to:

- Sam Wallace (netball)
- Sam Wallace (journalist)

== See also ==
- Samantha Wallace (disambiguation)
- Samuel Wallace (1892–1968), Scottish recipient of the Victoria Cross
