= Kelly Altmann =

Australian netball player

Personal information
- Born: 27 April 1993 (age 33) Murray Bridge, South Australia
- Height: 1.70 m (5 ft 7 in)

Netball career
- Playing positions: WA, C
Years	Club team	Apps
2019	Adelaide Thunderbirds	
2020–	Collingwood Magpies	

Kelly Altmann (born 27 April 1993) is an Australian netball player in the Suncorp Super Netball league, currently playing for the Collingwood Magpies.

== Career ==
Altmann's elite-level career commenced in 2019 when she was signed by the Adelaide Thunderbirds in the Australian Super Netball league. She had been a training partner at the South Australian-based team for two seasons prior to being signed onto the senior list by the club ahead of the 2019 season. During her time as a training partner, Altmann was vice-captain for the Thunderbirds' reserves team, the Southern Force in the Australian Netball League. Altmann played every match for the club in 2019, though she was not re-signed by the club at the end of the season. She was signed by the Collingwood Magpies ahead of the 2020 season as an injury replacement player, replacing the long-term injured Kelsey Browne at the club.

=== Statistics ===
Statistics are correct to the end of the 2019 season.

Season	Team	G/A	GA	RB	CPR	FD	IC	DF	PN	TO	MP
2019	Thunderbirds	0/0	100	0	2	171	2	10	85	31	14
2020	Magpies	0/0	0	0	0	0	0	0	0	0	0
Career		0/0	100	0	2	171	2	10	85	31	14
