= Samantha Wallace =

Samantha Wallace may refer to:

- Samantha Wallace (netball)
- Samantha Wallace, a character on the reality series Love & Hip Hop: New York

== See also ==
- Sam Wallace (disambiguation)
