= Sasha Glasgow =

Australian netball player

Personal information
- Born: 19 July 1998 (age 28) Moonta, South Australia
- Height: 1.87 m (6 ft 2 in)
- University: University of South Australia

Netball career
- Playing positions: GS, GA
Years	Club team	Apps
2017–2020	Adelaide Thunderbirds	
2021–2023 2026-	West Coast Fever	
2024-2025 2026	Melbourne Mavericks West Coast Fever	
Years	National team	Caps
2023	England Roses	

Sasha Glasgow (born 19 July 1998) is an English-Australian netball player in the Suncorp Super Netball league, playing for the West Coast Fever. She currently sits on the board of the Australian Netball Players’ Association.

== Club career ==
=== Adelaide Thunderbirds ===
Glasgow began her professional netball career at the Adelaide Thunderbirds as a training partner in the 2017 season and had a breakthrough year after making her debut for the senior team.

Glasgow had an interrupted season in 2018 and missed several matches as she battled with injury. She was re-signed by the Thunderbirds for the 2019 season. In 2019, Glasgow had an excellent season before rupturing her left ACL in the penultimate round of the season. She then rehabbed and made her return to the Thunderbirds in the 2020 season.

=== West Coast Fever ===
After four years with the Adelaide Thunderbirds, the club announced Glasgow would be leaving Adelaide to become a free agent where she was then signed with the West Coast Fever for the 2021 season. In 2022 Glasgow won the Super Netball with Fever. In the 2023 season, Glasgow broke the record for most successful Super-Shots in one game when she converted fourteen of her attempts against Queensland Firebirds. She also recorded the highest-ever Nissan Net Points in history in the same game.

=== Melbourne Mavericks ===
In 2024, she moved to the new Melbourne Mavericks team, but suffered a lower leg fracture in a preseason friendly against the Sunshine Coast Lightning that has sidelined her for the 2024 season.

=== West Coast Fever ===
She re-signed for West Coast Fever from 2026

== International career ==
Glasgow was born in Australia to English parents, and holds dual Australian and British citizenship. She was named in the 2016-17 Australian Netball World Youth Cup squad that went on to play the Finals against New Zealand.

In 2023, she was selected for the England Roses. In June 2026 Glasgow was selected into the 2026 Commonwealth Games team.

== Honours ==
=== West Coast Fever ===
- Suncorp Super Netball: 2022
