= Tasmanian Magpies =

Australian Netball League team

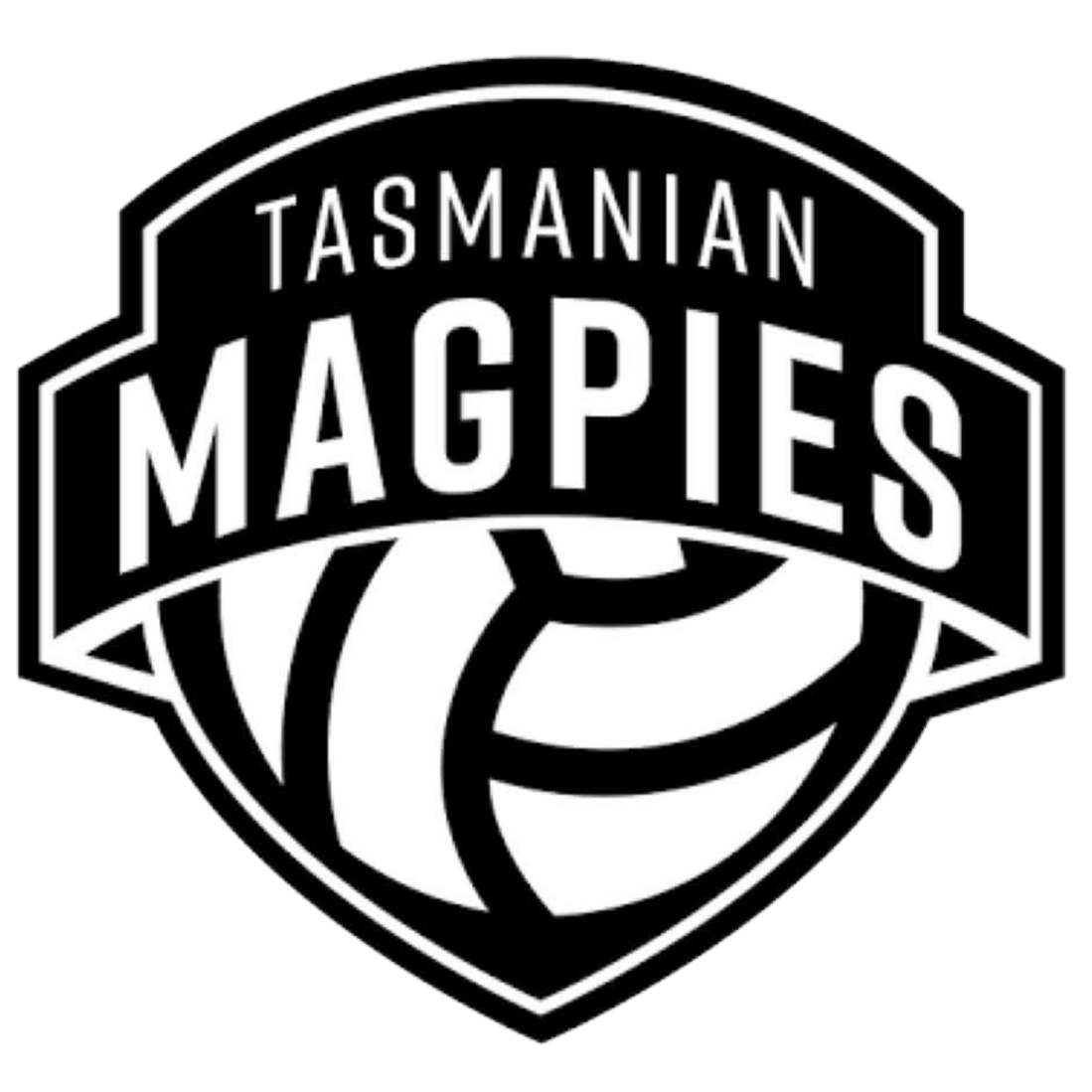
- Founded: 2017
- Disbanded: 2019
- Based in: Melbourne, Hobart and Launceston
- Regions: Tasmania; Victoria
- Head coach: Jon Fletcher
- Premierships: 1 (2018)
- League: Australian Netball League
- Website: tas.netball.com.au
Uniform

Tasmanian Magpies were an Australian netball team that represents Tasmania in the Australian Netball League. They were ANL champions in 2018. The team was formed in 2017 as a partnership between Netball Tasmania, the Tasmanian Government and Collingwood Magpies. Tasmanian Magpies are effectively the reserve team of Collingwood Magpies.

== History ==
=== Tasmanian Spirit ===
Netball Tasmania previously operated a team in the Australian Netball League between 2008 and 2015. It initially simply played as Tasmania but subsequently played as Tasmanian Spirit or Tassie Spirit.

=== Tasmanian Magpies ===
In 2017 Netball Tasmania, the Tasmanian Government and Collingwood Magpies formed a three-year partnership to enter a new team in the Australian Netball League. In February 2020 the partnership was renewed for a further two years.

== ANL grand finals ==
In 2018 with a team that included Melissa Bragg, Gabrielle Sinclair, Cody Lange and Kelsie Rainbow, Tasmanian Magpies reached and won their first ANL grand final in just their second season.

Season	Winners	Score	Runners-up	Venue
2018	Tasmanian Magpies	54–53	Canberra Giants	AIS Arena

== Home venues ==
Tasmanian Magpies play the majority of their home matches at various venues in Melbourne. During the 2017 season they played their home games at Hisense Arena. On 18 February 2017 they made their Australian Netball League debut with a 51–44 home win against Victorian Fury. The game was part of a double header which also featured the 2017 Suncorp Super Netball Round 1 match between Collingwood Magpies and Melbourne Vixens. During the 2018 season they played home matches at the State Netball and Hockey Centre and the Margaret Court Arena. They also played two matches in Tasmania. In June 2018 they defeated Queensland Fusion in two matches played at the Silverdome in Launceston. During the 2019 season they played home matches at the Hobart Netball and Sports Centre and Bendigo Stadium.

== Notable players ==
=== 2020 squad ===
Tasmanian Magpies – 2020 Australian Netball League roster
Players
Coaches

Name	Pos	DOB	Height	Club	Nat	Caps
Brooke Allan	GK, GD		–	^{(Note 1)}
Nyah Allen	GS, GA		–	^{(Note 1)}
Zoe Claridge			–	Cavaliers
Samantha Gooden	GA, GS	September 19, 1996 (age 28)	1.75 m (5 ft 9 in)		(Australia)
Rebecca Hyland	GD, GK		1.90 m (6 ft 3 in)	Kingston Blues
Zanna Jodlowska			–	Karana Flames
Sharni Lambden	C, WD		–	^{(Note 1)}
Shelby Miller			–	Cavaliers
Ashleigh Probert-Hill	WA, C		–	Cripps Waratah
Kelsie Rainbow	C, WA	September 26, 1996 (age 28)	1.75 m (5 ft 9 in)	Melbourne University Lightning	(Australia)
Emma Ryde	GS, GA		1.97 m (6 ft 6 in)	^{(Note 1)}
Alex Vinen	WD, GK, GD		–	Cripps Waratah

Head coach

- Jon Fletcher

Notes

- (c) – Captain
- (cc) – Co-captain
- (vc) – Vice-captain
- – Injury / maternity leave
- (TRP) – Temporary Replacement Player
Player profiles: Team website
Last updated: 25 July 2020

Notes

- ^1 Brooke Allan, Nyah Allen, Sharni Lambden and Emma Ryde are Collingwood Magpies training partners.

=== Collingwood Magpies ===
- Melissa Bragg
- Molly Jovic
- Cody Lange
- Kelsie Rainbow
- Gabrielle Sinclair

== Head coaches ==
Coach	Years
Jon Fletcher	2017
Kate Upton	2018
Elissa Kent	2018–2019
Jon Fletcher	2019–

== Premierships ==
- Australian Netball League
  - Winners: 2018: 1
