= Peta Stephens =

Australian netball player

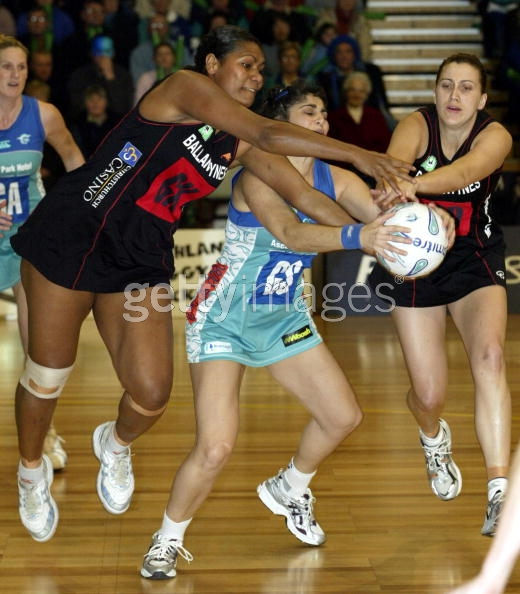
- 18 June 2004: Peta Stephens (right) playing for Canterbury Flames against Southern Sting in the 2004 National Bank Cup final at Stadium Southland. Herself and Flames team mate Vilimaina Davu challenge Sting's Natalie Avellino.

Personal information
- Born: 15 April 1978 (age 48) Brisbane, Australia
- Height: 1.83 m (6 ft 0 in)
- School: Brisbane State High School
- University: RMIT University

Netball career
- Playing positions: GD, GK, WD
Years	Club team	Apps
1997–1998	Australian Institute of Sport	
1997–2003	Queensland Firebirds	
2004	Canterbury Flames	
2005–2009	Queensland Firebirds	
2010	Canterbury Tactix	

Peta Stephens (born 15 April 1978) is a former Australian netball player. Between 1997 and 2009, Stephens played for Queensland Firebirds. She played for Firebirds in both the Commonwealth Bank Trophy and ANZ Championship eras and captained Firebirds between 2006 and 2009. She also played with the Australian Institute of Sport, and for New Zealand Teams Canterbury Flames and Canterbury Tactix, gaining experience in both Australian and New Zealand netball competitions.

== Playing career ==
=== Early years ===
Between 1995 and 2000, Stephens represented Queensland in the Australian National Netball Championships at under-19, under-21 and Open levels. Between 1997 and 1998, she played for the Australian Institute of Sport. Between 1996 and 1999, she also featured in Australia under-21 squads.

=== Queensland Firebirds ===
Between 1997 and 2003, and again from 2005 until 2009, Stephens played for Queensland Firebirds. She played for Firebirds in both the Commonwealth Bank Trophy and ANZ Championship eras. She captained Firebirds between 2006 and 2009. On 1 June 2007, she played her 100th match for Firebirds in a 54–45 win against Hunter Jaegers.

=== New Zealand ===
Stephens also had two spells playing netball in New Zealand. In 2004 she played for Canterbury Flames in the National Bank Cup. In 2009, she signed for Canterbury Tactix ahead of the 2010 ANZ Championship season. However a pre-season shoulder injury ruled her out for most of the season.

Notes

- ^1 Some sources suggest Stephens played for Melbourne Phoenix c. 2004.

== Education ==
Between 2014 and 2021, Stephens completed a Bachelor of Information Technology with RMIT University.
