= Gabrielle Sinclair =

Australian netball player

Personal information
- Born: 12 July 1993 (age 33)
- Height: 1.76 m (5 ft 9 in)
- School: Ringwood Secondary College

Netball career
- Playing positions: GS, GA

Gabrielle "Gabby" Sinclair (born 12 July 1993) is an Australian netball player in the Netball Super League, playing for the Birmingham Panthers.

== Career ==
Sinclair was a training partner at the Magpies in 2017 and 2018 and in that time played for the club's reserves team, the Tasmanian Magpies, where she was a key attacking figure in their premiership success in 2018. The Magpies elevated Sinclair to the senior list ahead of the 2019 season and re-signed her at the end of the season for another year.
