= Queensland State Netball Centre =

Netball arena in Nathan, Queensland

Queensland State Netball Centre Nissan Arena

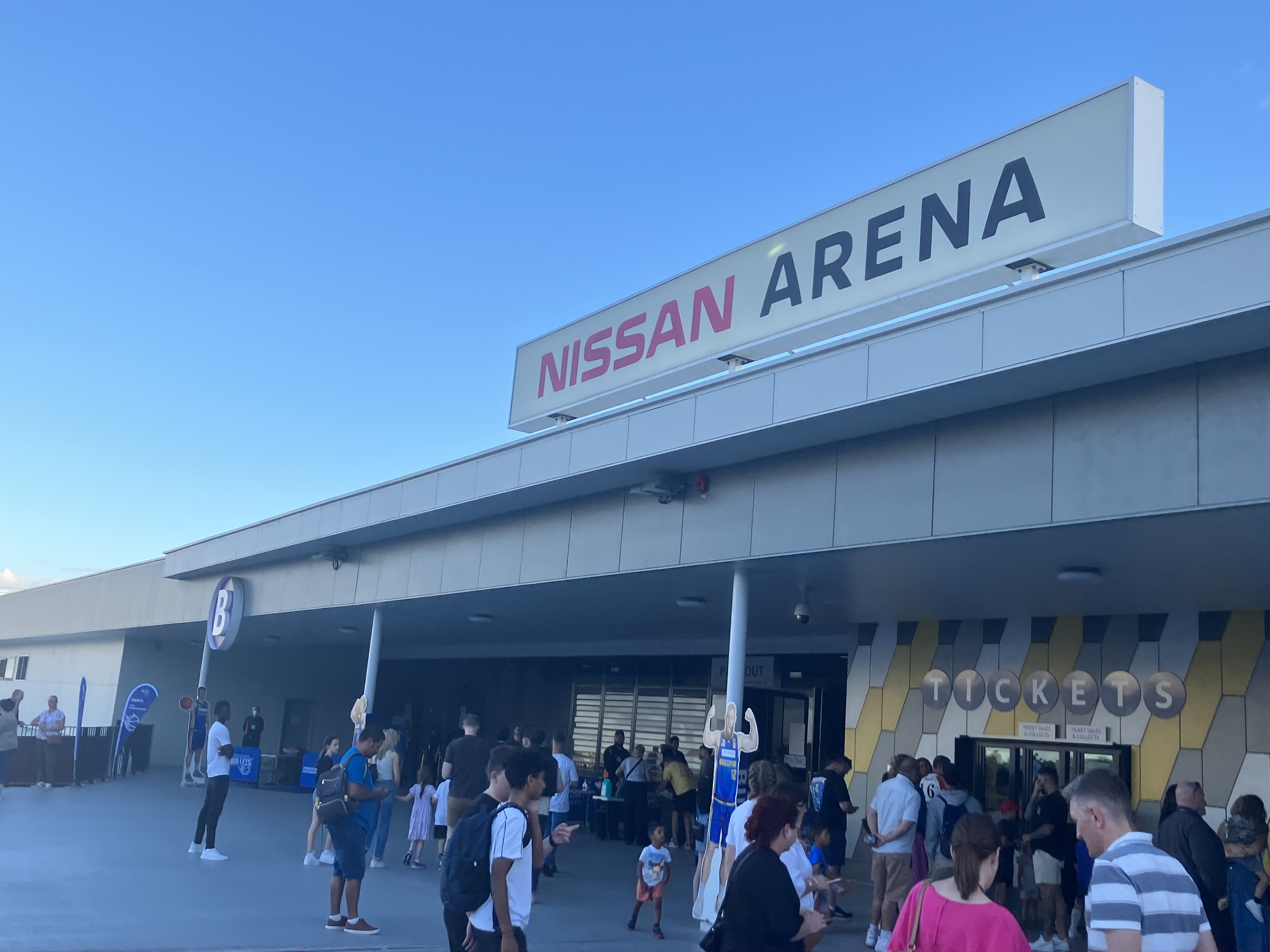
- Nissan Arena, 2022
- Interactive map of Queensland State Netball Centre; Nissan Arena
- Location: Corner Mains and Kessel Roads, Nathan, Queensland, 4111
- Coordinates: 27.5597°S 153.0653°E
- Owner: Queensland Government
- Operator: Netball Queensland
- Capacity: 5,000

Construction
- Groundbreaking: 2017
- Opened: 24 February 2019; 7 years ago
- Cost: A$44 million
- Architect: Thomson Adsett
- Builder: Hansen Yuncken

Tenants
- Brisbane Bullets (NBL) (2019–24); Queensland Firebirds (NNL) (2019–present)

Website
- https://nissanarena.com.au/

The Queensland State Netball Centre, also known commercially as Nissan Arena, is a multi-purpose facility located in the southern Brisbane suburb of Nathan. The centre features a 5,000 seat indoor arena that is the home court of Super Netball team the Queensland Firebirds, and previously (until 2024) National Basketball League club the Brisbane Bullets. It is the administrative headquarters of Netball Queensland and provides training facilities for elite-level and community-based netball clubs in Queensland.

== Venue ==
In July 2015 the Queensland Government announced plans for the first ever dedicated home for netball in the state, which would cater for professional netball club the Queensland Firebirds and provide administrative offices for Netball Queensland and other facilities for emerging players and clubs in the region. The facility was also known as Brisbane Arena during the construction phase of the project. The government appointed Hansen Yuncken as the design and construction contractor in February 2017 and construction of the centre began later that year.

The main features of the venue include:

- Sunken show court with 5000 seat capacity from where major game events will be broadcast
- Eight indoor hard courts
- Cafe and food and beverage outlets
- Player and umpire changing facilities for both community and elite athletes
- Gymnasium for players
- Sports science and sports medicine facility for elite athlete activities
- Administration offices and parking facilities for Netball Queensland.

The centre was opened on 24 February 2019, with the final cost of construction coming in at $44 million.

== Tenants ==
=== Netball ===
The precinct is the headquarters of Netball Queensland and Suncorp Super Netball side the Queensland Firebirds, who play all their home matches at the centre. It also became a training hub and home court for several other Super Netball teams during the 2020 season, who were forced to relocate matches to the venue as a result of the impact of the COVID-19 pandemic.

=== Basketball ===
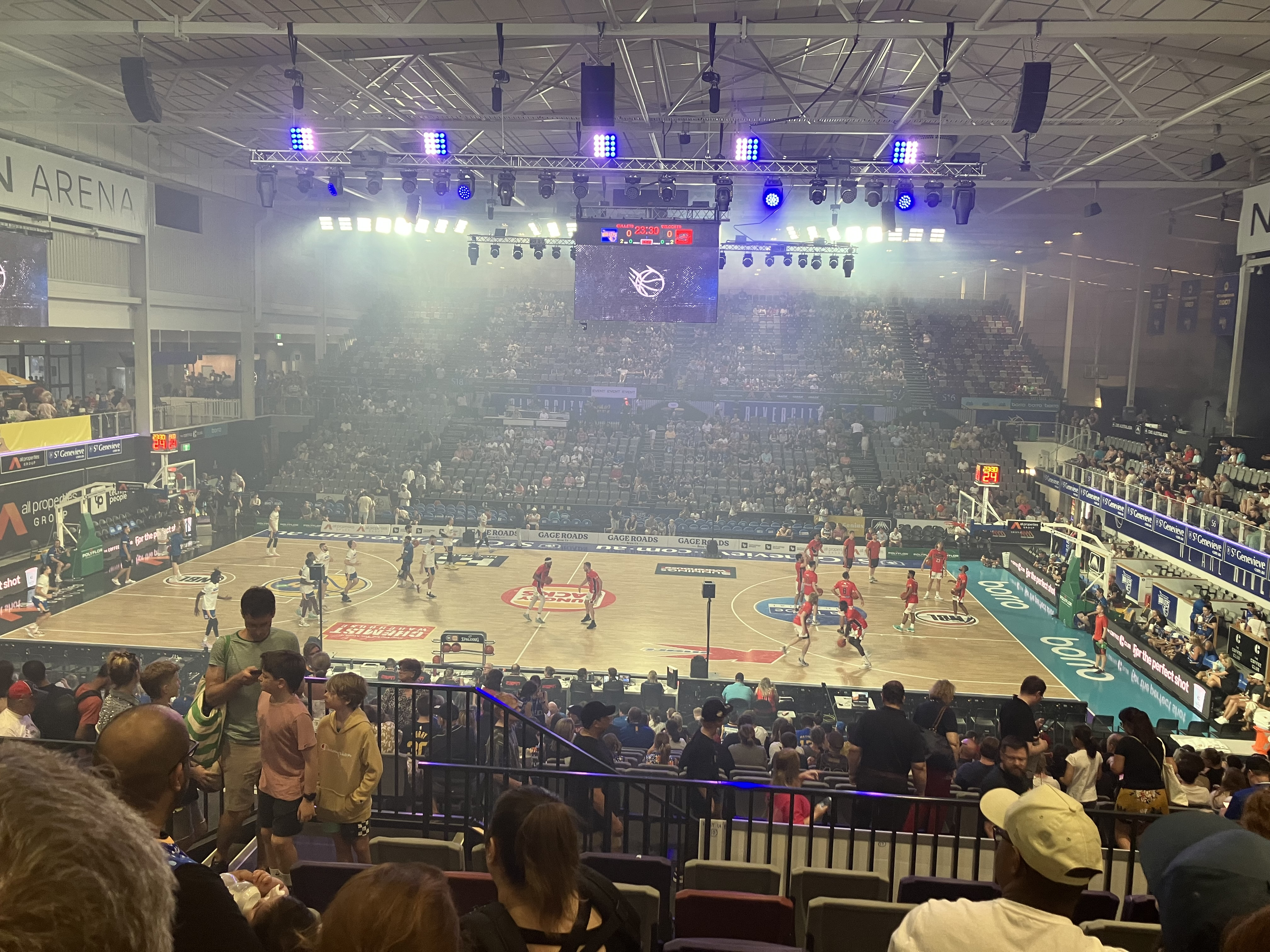
Brisbane Bullets vs Perth Wildcats NBL game, 27 December 2022

National Basketball League side the Brisbane Bullets announced they would move all home games to the centre in July 2019, ahead of the start of the season later that year. The arrangement with Netball Queensland allows the Bullets to base themselves in the one facility, as opposed to training and playing at separate arenas in the past. The centre hosted a Harlem Globetrotters exhibition in 2019. The Bullets have nicknamed the arena The Armoury for home matches. The bullets left Nissan Arena, returning to Brisbane Entertainment Centre in 2024.

On 4 November 2026, the Bullets will return to Nissan Arena for an NBL Ignite Cup game against the Perth Wildcats.

=== Other events ===
Netball Queensland has stated its intent to bring a range of indoor sporting and entertainment events to the venue. The Netball Centre hosted the Brisbane leg of the 2019 FIVB Volleyball Men's Nations League. The arena has hosted domestic indoor volleyball matches and was the site of the basketball and closing ceremony of the 2019 INAS Global Games.

== Naming rights ==
The venue was referred to as the Queensland State Netball Centre during construction and in the first year of its operation. In October 2019 the Japanese car manufacturer Nissan secured the commercial naming rights to the centre, which was renamed the Nissan Arena. The arrangement is in place for three years.

== See also ==
- Netball in Australia
- Queensland Sport and Athletics Centre
