= Shimona Nelson =

Jamaican netball player (born 1998)

Personal information
- Born: 1 December 1998 (age 27) Kingston, Jamaica
- Height: 1.95 m (6 ft 5 in)

Netball career
- Playing position: GS
Years	Club team	Apps
2018	Adelaide Thunderbirds	
2019–2023	Collingwood Magpies	
2024–present	Melbourne Mavericks	
Years	National team	Caps
2017–present	Jamaica	
Medal record
Netball
Representing Jamaica
Commonwealth Games
Silver medal – second place	2022 Birmingham	Netball
Netball World Championships
Bronze medal – third place	2023 Cape Town	Netball

Shimona Nelson (formerly Jok; born 1 December 1998) is a Jamaican netball player in the Suncorp Super Netball league, playing for the Melbourne Mavericks.

== Career ==
Nelson broke into the senior Jamaica national netball team in early 2017 in a test series against Barbados and has also represented Jamaica at Under-21 and Fast5 level. She was selected by the Adelaide Thunderbirds as a replacement player for the injured Cat Tuivaiti in the 2018 season, and played the most games in a winless season for the Thunderbirds. Nelson moved to Melbourne-based Super Netball team the Collingwood Magpies at end of the season, joining the Magpies squad for two years. She then joined the Melbourne Mavericks in 2024 as the new team took the license of the defunct Magpies.

=== Super Netball statistics ===
Statistics are correct to the end of the 2018 season.

Season	Team	G/A	GA	RB	CPR	FD	IC	DF	PN	TO	MP
2018	Thunderbirds	418/474	4	27	0	6	1	7	48	73	14
2019	Magpies	0/0	0	0	0	0	0	0	0	0	0
Career		418/474	4	27	0	6	1	7	48	73	14

== Personal life ==
Nelson studied a Bachelor of Psychological Science at Deakin University. She elected to pursue netball instead of playing college basketball in the United States.

Nelson became known as Shimona Jok ahead of the 2024 SSN season after her marriage to Australian professional basketballer Buay Jok in November 2023. She reverted to her maiden name ahead of the 2026 SSN season.
