= Kaylia Stanton =

Australian netball player

Personal information
- Born: 17 May 1994 (age 32)
- Height: 1.89 m (6 ft 2 in)
- Relative: Christine Stanton (Mother)
- School: St Mary's Anglican Girls' School
- University: Curtin University

Netball career
- Playing positions: GS, GA
Years	Club team	Apps
2016-2020	West Coast Fever	
2021	Melbourne Vixens	
Years	National team	Caps
	Australian 21/U team	Australian Fast5 team

Kaylia Stanton (born 17 May 1994) is an Australian netball player in who played in the Suncorp Super Netball league, playing for West Coast Fever and Melbourne Vixens.

== Netball career ==
Stanton was a member of the Australian under 21 squad and was also in the team that came in second in the 2013 World Youth Netball Championship in Glasgow, Scotland. In 2018, she again played for the West Coast Fever in the Suncorp Super Netball league. Stanton represented Australia at the 2017 Fast5 Netball World Series, where they finished runners-up to England. In 2019 she was re-signed by the Fever to the end of the 2020 season.

== Personal life ==
Stanton attended St Mary's Anglican Girls School in Perth, Western Australia before enrolling at Curtin University to study Nutrition and Health Promotion.

After following in her mother's footsteps and taking up athletics at a young age, Stanton was forced to choose between pursuing a career on the netball court, or on the athletics track. Stanton is the daughter of former Olympic high jumper Christine Stanton.
