= Alice Teague-Neeld =

Australian netball player

Personal information
- Born: 2 March 1996 (age 30) Melbourne, Victoria, Australia
- Height: 1.83 m (6 ft 0 in)
- School: Ivanhoe Grammar School
- University: Curtin University

Netball career
- Playing positions: GA, WA, GS
Years	Club team	Apps
2014–2016	Melbourne Vixens	
2017–2018	Collingwood Magpies	
2019–present	West Coast Fever	

Alice Teague-Neeld (born 2 March 1996) is an Australian netball player in the Suncorp Super Netball league, playing for the West Coast Fever.

Teague-Neeld began her professional netball career as a replacement player for the Melbourne Vixens in the 2014 ANZ Championship season, before permanently being picked up by the Vixens the following year. She was one of the inaugural signings of the Collingwood Magpies team prior to the start of the new Suncorp Super Netball competition in 2017. Considered one of Australia's youngest talents at the time, Teague-Neeld was named vice-captain of the Australian U/21 World Youth squad for 2017. Teague-Neeld struggled to break into the Magpies team on a regular basis during her two years at the club and at the end of the 2018 season she was signed by that year's runners-up the West Coast Fever on a multi-year deal.

Teague-Neeld is the daughter of former Melbourne Football Club coach Mark Neeld. She grew up in Ocean Grove and later moved to the Melbourne suburb of Northcote. She played junior netball for local clubs Ocean Grove Grubbers and St Joseph’s.
