= Queensland Firebirds =

Australian netball team

- Founded: 1997
- Based in: Brisbane
- Regions: Queensland
- Home venue: Nissan Arena
- Head coach: Kiri Wills
- Asst coach: Robert Wright
- Captain: Ruby Bakewell-Doran
- Premierships: 3 (2011, 2015, 2016)
- League: Super Netball; ANZ Championship (2008-2016); Commonwealth Bank Trophy (1997-2007)
- 2026 placing: 7th
- Website: www.firebirds.net.au
Playing dress

Queensland Firebirds are an Australian professional netball team based in Brisbane, Queensland. Since 2017, the club has played in Super Netball. Between 2008 and 2016, they played in the ANZ Championship and between 1997 and 2007, they played in the Commonwealth Bank Trophy. Firebirds were the most successful team during the ANZ Championship era, playing in five grand finals and winning three premierships, in 2011, 2015 and 2016. They were the only team to win back to back ANZ Championship titles.

== History ==
=== Commonwealth Bank Trophy ===
Between 1997 and 2007, Queensland Firebirds represented Netball Queensland in the Commonwealth Bank Trophy league. Together with Adelaide Ravens, Adelaide Thunderbirds, Melbourne Kestrels, Melbourne Phoenix, Perth Orioles, Sydney Sandpipers and Sydney Swifts, Firebirds were one of the founding members of the league. Between 2006 and 2009, Vicki Wilson, a former Australia netball international, served as Firebirds head coach. In 2006 Firebirds reached their first play-off series, losing 58–56 in the semi-finals to Melbourne Phoenix.

Regular season statistics
Season	Position	Won	Drawn	Lost
1997	7th	4	0	10
1998	7th	2	0	12
1999	8th	2	0	12
2000	7th	2	1	11
2001	8th	1	0	13
2002	6th	4	0	10
2003	7th	3	0	11
2004	7th	3	0	11
2005	8th	0	0	14
2006	4th	7	0	7
2007	5th	8	0	6

=== ANZ Championship ===
Between 2008 and 2016, Firebirds played in the ANZ Championship. Roselee Jencke was appointed head coach for the 2010 season, taking over from Wilson. In 2011 Firebirds finished the season undefeated. This marked the beginning of a golden age for the team. Between 2011 and 2016, Jencke guided Firebirds to five grand finals and three premierships. They were the most successful team during the ANZ Championship era and the only team to win back to back titles. Romelda Aiken, Laura Geitz and Clare McMeniman formed the nucleus of the Firebirds squad and featured in all three Championship winning squads.

Regular season statistics
Season	Position	Won	Drawn	Lost
2008	5th	7	0	6
2009	5th	8	0	5
2010	5th	7	0	6
2011	1st	13	0	0
2012	6th	7	0	6
2013	4th	9	0	4
2014	2nd	9	0	4
2015	1st	11	1	1
2016	1st	11	2	0

Premierships
Runners Up

=== Super Netball ===
Since 2017, Firebirds have played in Super Netball. They have only participated in one year of finals, being knocked out in the minor semi-final of 2018.

Regular season statistics
Season	Position	Won	Drawn	Lost
2017	5th	7	1	6
2018	3rd	9	0	5
2019	8th	1	2	11
2020	5th	6	1	7
2021	5th	6	0	8
2022	6th	5	0	9
2023	7th	4	0	10
2024	7th	4	0	10
2025	8th	2	0	12
2026	7th	4	0	10

== Grand finals ==
ANZ Championship

Season	Winners	Score	Runners up	Venue
2011	Queensland Firebirds	57–44	Northern Mystics	Brisbane Convention & Exhibition Centre
2013	Adelaide Thunderbirds	50–52	Queensland Firebirds	Adelaide Entertainment Centre
2014	Melbourne Vixens	53–55	Queensland Firebirds	Hisense Arena
2015	Queensland Firebirds	57–56	New South Wales Swifts	Brisbane Entertainment Centre
2016	Queensland Firebirds	69–67	New South Wales Swifts	Brisbane Entertainment Centre

== Home venues ==
As of 2019, the Firebirds play their home matches at Nissan Arena. It is also home to the club's administrative and training base, shared with the offices of Netball Queensland.

Firebirds have played their home games at various venues throughout their history across south-east Queensland, including the Chandler Arena, the Brisbane Entertainment Centre and Brisbane Convention & Exhibition Centre in Brisbane, as well as the Gold Coast Convention and Exhibition Centre and the Gold Coast Sports and Leisure Centre on the Gold Coast.

== Notable players ==
=== 2027 squad ===
2027 Queensland Firebirds roster
Players
Coaching staff

Nat.	Name	Position(s)	DoB	Height
(Australia)	Ruby Bakewell-Doran	GD, WD, GK	21 January 1999	1.84 m (6 ft 0 in)
(Australia)	Lara Dunkley	C, WA, WD	31 May 1995	1.80 m (5 ft 11 in)
(Australia)	Macy Gardner	C, WA, WD	7 June 2000	1.73 m (5 ft 8 in)
(Australia)	Lily Graham	GS, GA	27 September 2005	1.83 m (6 ft 0 in)
(New Zealand)	Kelly Jackson	GK, GD	22 October 1996	1.92 m (6 ft 4 in)
(Australia)	Cara Koenen	GS, GA	27 February 1996	1.90 m (6 ft 3 in)
(Australia)	Tabitha Packer	GD, WD	26 April 2005	1.81 m (5 ft 11 in)
(New Zealand)	Kimiora Poi	WA, C	01 November 1997	1.69 m (5 ft 7 in)
(New Zealand)	Te Paea Selby-Rickit	GA, GS	14 January 1992	1.88 m (6 ft 2 in)
(Australia)	Isabelle Shearer	GK, GD	8 February 2003	1.89 m (6 ft 2 in)

Head coach

- (New Zealand) Kiri Wills

Assistant coach

- (Australia) Rob Wright

Notes

- (c) – Captain
- (cc) – Co-captain
- (vc) – Vice-captain
- – Injury / maternity leave
- (TRP) – Temporary Replacement Player
Player profiles: Team website
Last updated: 23 October 2026

=== Internationals ===
Australia

- Rebecca Bulley
- Rudi Ellis
- Michelle Fielke
- Sharon Finnan
- Laura Geitz
- Tara Hinchliffe
- Alexandra Hodge
- Cara Koenen
- Demelza McCloud
- Clare McMeniman
- Natalie Medhurst
- Joanne Morgan
- Caitlyn Nevins
- Lauren Nourse
- Chelsea Pitman
- Kim Ravaillion
- Laura Scherian
- Verity Simmons
- Gabi Simpson
- Amy Steel
- Gretel Tippett
- Donnell Wallam
- Vicki Wilson
- Steph Wood

Australia Fast5

- Karyn Bailey
- Carla Dziwoki
- Kate Shimmin
- Verity Simmons
- Amorette Wild

England

- Imogen Allison
- Tamsin Greenway
- Chelsea Pitman
- Kate Shimmin
- Eboni Usoro-Brown

Fiji

- Simone Nalatu

Jamaica

- Romelda Aiken

New Zealand

- Ameliaranne Ekenasio
- Maddy Gordon
- Kelly Jackson
- Kimiora Poi
- Te Paea Selby-Rickit

Papua New Guinea

- Maleta Roberts

Samoa

- Jessie Laga'aia

South Africa

- Erin Burger
- Ine-Mari Venter
- Lenize Potgieter

Tonga

- Hulita Veve

Uganda

- Mary Cholhok

=== Captains ===
Name	Years
Carla Dziwoki	2005 (co-captain)
Melanie McKenzie	2005 (co-captain)
Peta Stephens	2006–2009
Lauren Nourse	2010–2012
Laura Geitz	2012–2016
Gabi Simpson	2017–2021
Kim Ravaillion	2022–2024
Ruby Bakewell-Doran	2025 (co-captain); 2026-present (sole captain)
Hulita Veve	2025 (co-captain)

== Club Award winners ==
Laura Geitz Medal

Season	Player
2019	Gretel Tippett
2020	Romelda Aiken
2021	Kim Ravaillion
2022	Gretel Bueta
2023	Ruby Bakewell-Doran
2024	Macy Gardner
2025	Ruby Bakewell-Doran
2026	Kelly Jackson

Players' Player

Season	Player
2019	Gretel Tippett
2020	Romelda Aiken
2021	Kim Ravaillion
2022	Gabi Simpson
2023	Donnell Wallam
2024	Hulita Veve
2025	Lara Dunkley
2026	Kelly Jackson

Members' Player

Season	Player
2019	Gretel Tippett
2020	Kim Jenner
2021	Kim Ravaillion
2022	Ruby Bakewell-Doran
2023	Ruby Bakewell-Doran
2024	Hulita Veve
2025	Macy Gardner
2026	Kelly Jackson

Keirra Trompf Spirit Award

Season	Player
2019	Tara Hinchliffe
2020	Romelda Aiken
2021	Lara Dunkley
2022	Mia Stower
2023	Macy Gardner
2024	Alison Miller
2025	Hulita Veve
2026	Kelly Jackson

== Competition Award winners ==
ANZ Championship MVP

Season	Player
2008	Romelda Aiken (joint winner)
2009	Romelda Aiken
2011	Natalie Medhurst (joint winner)
2015	Romelda Aiken (joint winner)

ANZ Championship Australian Player of the Year

Season	Player
2011	Laura Geitz
2014	Laura Geitz

Commonwealth Bank Trophy Best New Talent

Season	Player
1998	Natalie Sloane
2003	Carla Dziwoki

Super Netball Rookie of the Year

Season	Player
2022	Donnell Wallam

ANZ Championship Leading Goalscorer

Season	Player
2011	Romelda Aiken
2015	Romelda Aiken

ANZ Championship Grand Final MVP

Season	Player
2011	Romelda Aiken
2016	Kim Ravaillion

ANZ Championship All Star Team

Season	Player	Position
2011	Romelda Aiken	GS
2011	Roselee Jencke	Coach
2015	Kim Ravaillion	C
2016	Romelda Aiken	GS
2016	Kim Ravaillion	C
2016	Clare McMeniman	GD

Super Netball Team of the Year

Season	Player	Position
2017	Gabi Simpson	WD
2018	Gretel Tippett	GA
2018	Laura Geitz	Reserve
2019	Gretel Tippett	GA
2020	Gabi Simpson	WD
2021	Kim Ravaillion	C
2021	Gabi Simpson	WD
2022	Gretel Bueta	GA
2023	Donnell Wallam	GS
2026	Kelly Jackson	Reserve

== Head coaches ==
Coach	Years
Patti Farrell	1997–1999
Sue Hawkins	1999–2003
Brenda Scherian	2004–2005
Vicki Wilson	2006–2009
Roselee Jencke	2010–2020
Megan Anderson	2021–2022
Rebecca Bulley	2023–2024
Kiri Wills	2025–present

ANZ Championship Australian Coach of the Year

Season	Coach
2011	Roselee Jencke
2015	Roselee Jencke
2016	Roselee Jencke

Joyce Brown Coach of the Year

Season	Coach
2014	Roselee Jencke

== Firebirds Futures ==
The reserve team of the Queensland Firebirds is known as the Firebirds Futures, and previously played as the Queensland Fusion and the Queensland Sapphires. This team currently plays in the Super Netball Reserves competition, which began in 2024, after rebranding from the Australian Netball Championships and prior to that, the Australian Netball League.

== Premierships ==
- ANZ Championship
  - Winners: 2011, 2015, 2016
  - Runners Up: 2013, 2014
