= 2012 ANZ Championship season =

Netball league season

- League: ANZ Championship
- Sport: Netball
- Duration: 31 March 2012 – 22 July 2012
- Teams: 10
- TV partner(s): One HD; Network 10; Sky Sport (New Zealand); TVNZ

2012 ANZ Championship season
- Champions: Waikato Bay of Plenty Magic
- Runners-up: Melbourne Vixens
- Minor premiers: Melbourne Vixens
- Season MVP: Temepara George (Mystics); Laura Langman (Magic)
- Top scorer: Irene van Dyk (Magic)

ANZ Championship seasons
- ← 2011 2013 →

The 2012 ANZ Championship season was the fifth season of the ANZ Championship. The 2012 season began on 31 March and concluded on 22 July. With a team coached by Noeline Taurua, captained by Laura Langman and featuring Leana de Bruin, Irene van Dyk, Julianna Naoupu and Casey Williams, Waikato Bay of Plenty Magic eventually won the premiership. They became fifth team in as many seasons to win the title. Melbourne Vixens won the minor premiership after winning 10 of their 13 matches. Meanwhile, Magic lost their first four matches. However, they subsequently won 12 matches in a row to finish third during the regular season and champions overall. In the minor semi-final they defeated Adelaide Thunderbirds and in the preliminary final they defeated Northern Mystics after extra time. In the grand final they defeated Vixens 41–38. As a result, they became the first, and only, New Zealand team to win the Championship. They were also the first and only team to start the season with four defeats and win the title and the first and only team to finish third in the regular season and win the title.

== Transfers ==
Player	2011 team	2012 team
(Australia) Rebecca Bulley	New South Wales Swifts	Adelaide Thunderbirds
(Australia) Renae Hallinan	Melbourne Vixens	Adelaide Thunderbirds
(Australia) Ashlee Howard	West Coast Fever	Melbourne Vixens
(Australia) Karyn Howarth	Victorian Fury	Melbourne Vixens
(Australia) Kara Richards	Adelaide Thunderbirds	Melbourne Vixens
(Australia) Paige Hadley	NNSW Waratahs/AIS	New South Wales Swifts
(Australia) April Letton	NNSW Waratahs	New South Wales Swifts
(Australia) Samantha May	NNSW Waratahs	New South Wales Swifts
(Australia) Gabi Simpson	NNSW Blues/AIS	New South Wales Swifts
(Australia) Joanna Sutton	Adelaide Thunderbirds	New South Wales Swifts
(Australia) Shannon Eagland	Victorian Fury	Queensland Firebirds
(Australia) Ashleigh Brazill	New South Wales Swifts	West Coast Fever
(England) Eboni Beckford-Chambers	Team Bath	West Coast Fever
(Australia) Catherine Cox	New South Wales Swifts	West Coast Fever
(Australia) Verity Simmons	NNSW Waratahs	West Coast Fever
(New Zealand) Sophia Fenwick	Southern Steel	Canterbury Tactix
(New Zealand) Elizabeth Manu	Central Pulse	Canterbury Tactix
(England) Joanne Harten	Loughborough Lightning	Canterbury Tactix
(England) Stacey Francis	Team Bath	Canterbury Tactix
(New Zealand) Joline Henry	Northern Mystics	Central Pulse
(New Zealand) Paula Griffin	Southern Steel	Central Pulse
(New Zealand) Jamilah Gupwell	Waikato Bay of Plenty Magic	Central Pulse
(New Zealand) Te Huinga Reo Selby-Rickit	Southern Steel	Central Pulse
(England) Jade Clarke	?	Northern Mystics
(New Zealand) Charlotte Kight	Canterbury Tactix	Northern Mystics
(New Zealand) Courtney Tairi	New South Wales Swifts	Southern Steel
(New Zealand) Donna Wilkins	Canterbury Tactix	Southern Steel
(New Zealand) Leana de Bruin	Southern Steel	Waikato Bay of Plenty Magic
(Australia) Khao Watts	Southern Force	Waikato Bay of Plenty Magic
(England) Ama Agbeze	West Coast Fever	West Coast Falcons

== Head coaches ==
Team	Head coach
Queensland Firebirds	(Australia) Roselee Jencke
New South Wales Swifts	(Australia) Lisa Beehag
Melbourne Vixens	(Australia) Julie Hoornweg
Adelaide Thunderbirds	(Australia) Jane Woodlands-Thompson
West Coast Fever	(Australia) Norma Plummer
Northern Mystics	(New Zealand) Debbie Fuller
Waikato Bay of Plenty Magic	(New Zealand) Noeline Taurua
Central Pulse	(New Zealand) Robyn Broughton
Canterbury Tactix	(New Zealand) Leigh Gibbs
Southern Steel	(Australia) Natalie Avellino (New Zealand) Janine Southby

== Tauranga Pre-Season Tournament ==
On 2, 3 and 4 March, Waikato Bay of Plenty Magic hosted a pre-season tournament at the TECT Arena in Tauranga. For the first time since 2008, all ten ANZ Championship teams competed at the same tournament. The ten teams were divided into two pools of five. Teams within each pool played each other once and the winners qualified for the final. The other teams also played in a series of playoffs to decide final placings. The tournament was won by Queensland Firebirds who defeated Melbourne Vixens 50–30 in the final.

9th/10th place playoff

Sunday 4 March	Canterbury Tactix	49–42	Southern Steel	TECT Arena

7th/8th place play-off

Sunday 4 March	Adelaide Thunderbirds	42–34	New South Wales Swifts	TECT Arena

5th/6th place play-off

Sunday 4 March	West Coast Fever	54–39	Central Pulse	TECT Arena

3rd/4th place play-off

Sunday 4 March	Waikato Bay of Plenty Magic	51–36	Northern Mystics	TECT Arena

Final

Sunday 4 March	Queensland Firebirds	50–30	Melbourne Vixens	TECT Arena

== Regular season ==
Melbourne Vixens finished the regular season as minor premiers. After winning their first six matches, they lost to New South Wales Swifts in Round 7. They then lost three successive matches, another to Swifts and one to Northern Mystics. On 20 May in Round 8, against Mystics, Vixens were undone by Mystics defender Anna Harrison and her Harrison Hoist. Harrison made several vital blocks while being hoisted rugby union lineout-style by her defensive partners, helping Mystics secure a 49–45 win. However, Vixens successively claimed the minor premiership with three wins in the final three rounds.

=== Round 1 ===
Saturday 31 March	Adelaide Thunderbirds	57 – 40	New South Wales Swifts	Netball SA Stadium
13:50 (UTC+10:30)	Erin Bell 16/24 (67%); Carla Borrego 41/48 (85%)	Report; Stats	Kimberly Borger 3/6 (50%); Carla Dziwoki 16/20 (80%); Susan Pratley 21/26 (81%)

Sunday 1 April	Queensland Firebirds	42 – 47	Melbourne Vixens	Brisbane Convention and Exhibition Centre
14:20 (UTC+10:00)	Romelda Aiken 29/35 (83%); Natalie Medhurst 13/21 (62%)	Report; Stats	Kate Beveridge 15/19 (79%); Karyn Howarth 26/38 (68%); Tegan Caldwell 6/8 (75%)

Sunday 1 April	Northern Mystics	51 – 47	Central Pulse	Trusts Stadium
19:20 (UTC+12:00)	Catherine Latu 33/34 (97%); Grace Rasmussen 6/7 (86%); Maria Tutaia 12/16 (75%)	Report; Stats	Amber Bellringer 3/4 (75%); Paula Griffin 15/24 (63%); Caitlin Thwaites 29/35 (83%)

Monday 2 April	Southern Steel	49 – 47	Waikato Bay of Plenty Magic	Stadium Southland
19:40 (UTC+12:00)	Jodi Brown 17/24 (71%); Donna Wilkins 32/35 (91%)	Report; Stats	Julianna Naoupu 12/18 (67%); Irene van Dyk 30/30 (100%); Jess Waitapu 5/5 (100%)

Monday 2 April	West Coast Fever	55 – 35	Canterbury Tactix	Challenge Stadium
17:40 (UTC+08:00)	Caitlin Bassett 35/44 (80%); Catherine Cox 20/30 (67%)	Report; Stats	Ellen Halpenny 14/21 (67%); Joanne Harten 18/28 (64%); Anna Thompson 3/3 (100%)

=== Round 2 ===
Saturday 7 April	Central Pulse	47 – 42	Southern Steel	Pettigrew Green Arena
16:20 (UTC+12:00)	Paula Griffin 18/26 (69%); Caitlin Thwaites 29/33 (88%)	Stats	Jodi Brown 13/21 (62%); Donna Wilkins 29/33 (88%)

Sunday 8 April	Queensland Firebirds	44 – 54	Adelaide Thunderbirds	Brisbane Convention and Exhibition Centre
12:10 (UTC+10:00)	Romelda Aiken 34/43 (79%); Natalie Medhurst 10/11 (91%); Chelsea Pitman 0/1 (0%)	Stats	Erin Bell 22/29 (76%); Carla Borrego 32/35 (91%)

Sunday 8 April	West Coast Fever	41 – 50	Melbourne Vixens	Challenge Stadium
12:20 (UTC+08:00)	Caitlin Bassett 26/30 (87%); Catherine Cox 13/23 (57%); Nikala Smith 2/4 (50%)	Stats	Kate Beveridge 14/18 (78%); Tegan Caldwell 26/33 (79%); Karyn Howarth 10/12 (83%)

Sunday 8 April	Waikato Bay of Plenty Magic	41 – 47	Northern Mystics	Claudelands Arena
19:20 (UTC+12:00)	Julianna Naoupu 23/29 (79%); Irene van Dyk 17/21 (81%); Arahi Wall 1/2 (50%)	Stats	Cathrine Latu 16/17 (94%); Maria Tutaia 31/39 (79%)

Monday 9 April	Canterbury Tactix	54 – 51	New South Wales Swifts	CBS Canterbury Arena
19:40 (UTC+12:00)	Ellen Halpenny 13/19 (68%); Joanne Harten 38/46 (83%); Anna Thompson 3/5 (60%)	Stats	Carla Dziwoki 27/32 (84%); Susan Pratley 24/27 (89%)

=== Round 3 ===
Sunday 15 April	Queensland Firebirds	58 – 32	Central Pulse	Brisbane Convention and Exhibition Centre
12:10 (UTC+12:00)	Romelda Aiken 38/48 (79%); Natalie Medhurst 20/22 (91%)	Stats	Amber Bellringer 7/10 (70%); Paula Griffin 4/12 (33%); Caitlin Thwaites 21/28 (75%)

Sunday 15 April	Adelaide Thunderbirds	34 – 48	Melbourne Vixens	Netball SA Stadium
13:50 (UTC+09:30)	Erin Bell 14/16 (88%); Carla Borrego 20/26 (77%)	Stats	Kate Beveridge 18/23 (78%); Tegan Caldwell 22/23 (96%); Karyn Howarth 8/12 (67%)

Sunday 15 April	Canterbury Tactix	53 – 55	Southern Steel	CBS Canterbury Arena
19:20 (UTC+12:00)	Ellen Halpenny 14/18 (78%); Joanne Harten 32/38 (84%); Anna Thompson 7/10 (70%)	Stats	Jodi Brown 31/36 (86%); Donna Wilkins 24/28 (86%)

Monday 16 April	Northern Mystics	52 – 45	West Coast Fever	Trusts Stadium
19:40 (UTC+12:00)	Cathrine Latu 31/32 (97%); Grace Rasmussen 4/5 (80%); Maria Tutaia 17/21 (81%)	Stats	Caitlin Bassett 39/40 (98%); Catherine Cox 6/11 (55%)

Monday 16 April	New South Wales Swifts	49 – 47	Waikato Bay of Plenty Magic	Sydney Olympic Park Sports Centre
19:40 (UTC+10:00)	Carla Dziwoki 23/25 (92%); Susan Pratley 26/31 (84%)	Stats	Julianna Naoupu 23/28 (82%); Irene van Dyk 24/25 (96%)	Attendance: 3,665

=== Round 4 ===
Saturday 21 April	Southern Steel	53 – 56	West Coast Fever	Lion Foundation Arena
16:20 (UTC+12:00)	Jodi Brown 26/36 (72%); Donna Wilkins 27/39 (69%)	Stats	Caitlin Bassett 49/55 (89%); Catherine Cox 7/12 (58%)

Sunday 22 April	Melbourne Vixens	40 – 39	Waikato Bay of Plenty Magic	Hisense Arena
12:10 (UTC+10:00)	Kate Beveridge 18/23 (78%); Tegan Caldwell 17/21 (81%); Karyn Howarth 5/7 (71%)	Stats	Julianna Naoupu 9/17 (53%); Irene van Dyk 25/30 (83%); Jess Waitapu 5/7 (71%)

Sunday 22 April	New South Wales Swifts	54 – 49	Queensland Firebirds	Sydney Olympic Park Sports Centre
14:20 (UTC+10:00)	Carla Dziwoki 14/17 (82%); Susan Pratley 30/34 (88%); Amorette Wild 10/12 (83%)	Stats	Romelda Aiken 30/39 (77%); Natalie Medhurst 19/22 (86%)

Sunday 22 April	Northern Mystics	48 – 50	Adelaide Thunderbirds	Trusts Stadium
19:20 (UTC+12:00)	Cathrine Latu 11/11 (100%); Grace Rasmussen 3/4 (75%); Maria Tutaia 34/44 (77%)	Stats	Erin Bell 16/19 (84%); Carla Borrego 34/38 (89%)

Monday 23 April	Central Pulse	50 – 45	Canterbury Tactix	Te Rauparaha Arena
19:40 (UTC+12:00)	Paula Griffin 12/16 (75%); Caitlin Thwaites 38/40 (95%)	Stats	Ellen Halpenny 22/27 (81%); Joanne Harten 19/22 (86%); Anna Thompson 4/9 (44%)

=== Round 5 ===
Sunday 29 April	West Coast Fever	36 – 48	Adelaide Thunderbirds	Challenge Stadium
10:10 (UTC+08:00)	Caitlin Bassett 23/27 (85%); Catherine Cox 8/17 (47%); Sarah East 5/9 (56%)	Stats	Erin Bell 21/28 (75%); Carla Borrego 27/32 (84%)

Sunday 29 April	Melbourne Vixens	52 – 51	Queensland Firebirds	Hisense Arena
14:20 (UTC+10:00)	Kate Beveridge 12/16 (75%); Tegan Caldwell 27/33 (82%); Karyn Howarth 13/16 (81%)	Stats	Romelda Aiken 33/36 (92%); Natalie Medhurst 18/23 (78%)

Sunday 29 April	Central Pulse	47 – 51	Northern Mystics	Arena Manawatu
19:20 (UTC+12:00)	Paula Griffin 14/19 (74%); Caitlin Thwaites 33/37 (89%)	Stats	Cathrine Latu 29/29 (100%); Maria Tutaia 22/29 (76%)

Monday 30 April	Waikato Bay of Plenty Magic	61 – 52	Canterbury Tactix	Energy Events Centre
19:40 (UTC+12:00)	Julianna Naoupu 28/35 (80%); Irene van Dyk 33/33 (100%)	Stats	Joanne Harten 49/58 (84%); Anna Thompson 3/8 (38%)

BYES: New South Wales Swifts and Southern Steel

=== Round 6: Rivalry Round ===
Round 6 featured five Australia verses New Zealand matches. Goals scored by Australian and New Zealand teams were added together and the country with the most goals won the Rivalry Round Trophy.

Sunday 6 May	New South Wales Swifts	39 – 36	Central Pulse	Sydney Olympic Park Sports Centre
12:10 (UTC+10:00)	Kimberly Borger 5/6 (83%); Carla Dziwoki 3/5 (60%); Susan Pratley 20/22 (91%); Amorette Wild 11/15 (73%)	Stats	Paula Griffin 4/5 (80%); Jamilah Gupwell 2/6 (33%); Caitlin Thwaites 30/37 (81%)

Sunday 6 May	Queensland Firebirds	56 – 43	Northern Mystics	Gold Coast Convention and Exhibition Centre
14:20 (UTC+10:00)	Romelda Aiken 34/47 (72%); Natalie Medhurst 22/24 (92%)	Stats	Cathrine Latu 19/19 (100%); Grace Rasmussen 0/1 (0%); Maria Tutaia 24/32 (75%)

Sunday 6 May	Waikato Bay of Plenty Magic	65 – 49	West Coast Fever	TECT Arena
19:20 (UTC+12:00)	Julianna Naoupu 28/38 (74%); Irene van Dyk 37/39 (95%)	Stats	Caitlin Bassett 30/34 (88%); Catherine Cox 19/23 (83%)

Monday 7 May	Canterbury Tactix	41 – 65	Melbourne Vixens	CBS Canterbury Arena
19:40 (UTC+12:00)	Ellen Halpenny 11/12 (92%); Joanne Harten 20/30 (67%); Anna Thompson 10/13 (77%)	Stats	Kate Beveridge 8/11 (73%); Tegan Caldwell 29/29 (100%); Karyn Howarth 28/34 (82%)

Monday 7 May	Adelaide Thunderbirds	58 – 48	Southern Steel	Netball SA Stadium
19:40 (UTC+09:30)	Erin Bell 18/19 (95%); Carla Borrego 40/46 (87%)	Stats	Jodi Brown 18/25 (72%); Te Paea Selby-Rickit 10/13 (77%); Donna Wilkins 20/23 (87%)

=== Round 7 ===
Sunday 13 May	Adelaide Thunderbirds	60 – 43	West Coast Fever	Netball SA Stadium
11:40 (UTC+09:30)	Erin Bell 17/22 (77%); Carla Borrego 43/45 (96%)	Stats	Caitlin Bassett 38/42 (90%); Catherine Cox 3/5 (60%); Sarah East 0/2 (0%); Nikala Smith 2/4 (50%)

Sunday 13 May	New South Wales Swifts	55 – 52	Melbourne Vixens	Allphones Arena
14:20 (UTC+10:00)	Carla Dziwoki 14/19 (74%); Susan Pratley 31/34 (91%); Amorette Wild 10/13 (77%)	Stats	Kate Beveridge 4/4 (100%); Tegan Caldwell 23/26 (88%); Karyn Howarth 25/31 (81%)

Sunday 13 May	Southern Steel	45 – 49	Northern Mystics	Lion Foundation Arena
19:20 (UTC+12:00)	Jodi Brown 19/25 (76%); Donna Wilkins 26/28 (93%)	Stats	Cathrine Latu 35/35 (100%); Grace Rasmussen 1/3 (33%); Maria Tutaia 13/19 (68%)

Monday 14 May	Central Pulse	46 – 56	Waikato Bay of Plenty Magic	Te Rauparaha Arena
19:40 (UTC+12:00)	Amber Bellringer 2/4 (50%); Paula Griffin 9/17 (53%); Jamilah Gupwell 1/2 (50%); Caitlin Thwaites 34/42 (81%)	Stats	Julianna Naoupu 21/28 (75%); Irene van Dyk 35/37 (95%)

Monday 14 May	Queensland Firebirds	64 – 48	Canterbury Tactix	Brisbane Convention and Exhibition Centre
19:40 (UTC+10:00)	Romelda Aiken 38/43 (88%); Natalie Medhurst 26/29 (90%)	Stats	Ellen Halpenny 20/30 (67%); Joanne Harten 23/29 (79%); Anna Thompson 5/9 (56%)

=== Round 8 ===
Saturday 19 May	Canterbury Tactix	42 – 65	Waikato Bay of Plenty Magic	CBS Canterbury Arena
16:20 (UTC+12:00)	Ellen Halpenny 22/31 (71%); Joanne Harten 19/24 (79%); Anna Thompson 1/2 (50%)	Stats	Julianna Naoupu 22/29 (76%); Irene van Dyk 43/44 (98%)

Sunday 20 May	Melbourne Vixens	45 – 49	Northern Mystics	Hisense Arena
12:10 (UTC+10:00)	Kate Beveridge 12/16 (75%); Tegan Caldwell 20/23 (87%); Karyn Howarth 13/15 (87%)	Report; Stats	Cathrine Latu 23/24 (96%); Maria Tutaia 26/34 (76%)

Sunday 20 May	New South Wales Swifts	52 – 47	West Coast Fever	Newcastle Entertainment Centre
14:20 (UTC+10:00)	Carla Dziwoki 8/11 (73%); Susan Pratley 32/39 (82%); Amorette Wild 12/14 (86%)	Stats	Caitlin Bassett 43/48 (90%); Catherine Cox 4/8 (50%)

Sunday 20 May	Southern Steel	60 – 61	Queensland Firebirds	Stadium Southland
19:20 (UTC+12:00)	Jodi Brown 32/40 (80%); Donna Wilkins 28/30 (93%)	Stats	Romelda Aiken 37/42 (88%); Natalie Medhurst 24/27 (89%)

Monday 21 May	Central Pulse	47 – 46	Adelaide Thunderbirds	TSB Bank Arena
19:20 (UTC+12:00)	Paula Griffin 14/20 (70%); Caitlin Thwaites 33/7 (471%)	Stats	Erin Bell 19/22 (86%); Carla Borrego 27/34 (79%)

=== Round 9 ===
Sunday 27 May	West Coast Fever	55 – 56	Queensland Firebirds	Challenge Stadium
10:10 (UTC+08:00)	Caitlin Bassett 34/37 (92%); Catherine Cox 21/29 (72%)	Stats	Romelda Aiken 32/34 (94%); Natalie Medhurst 24/31 (77%)

Sunday 27 May	Melbourne Vixens	43 – 49	New South Wales Swifts	Hisense Arena
14:20 (UTC+10:00)	Kate Beveridge 18/22 (82%); Tegan Caldwell 11/11 (100%); Karyn Howarth 14/16 (88%)	Stats	Carla Dziwoki 4/6 (67%); Susan Pratley 32/37 (86%); Amorette Wild 13/16 (81%)

Sunday 27 May	Northern Mystics	57 – 56	Canterbury Tactix	Trusts Stadium
19:20 (UTC+12:00)	Cathrine Latu 33/34 (97%); Maria Tutaia 24/34 (71%)	Stats	Ellen Halpenny 23/33 (70%); Joanne Harten 33/40 (83%)

Monday 28 May	Southern Steel	50 – 58	Central Pulse	Lion Foundation Arena
19:40 (UTC+12:00)	Jodi Brown 16/19 (84%); Te Paea Selby-Rickit 12/19 (63%); Donna Wilkins 22/24 (92%)	Stats	Paula Griffin 23/29 (79%); Caitlin Thwaites 35/40 (88%)

BYES: Adelaide Thunderbirds and Waikato Bay of Plenty Magic

=== Round 10 ===
Sunday 3 June	Queensland Firebirds	50 – 45	New South Wales Swifts	Brisbane Convention and Exhibition Centre
12:10 (UTC+10:00)	Romelda Aiken 38/43 (88%); Natalie Medhurst 12/20 (60%)	Report	Susan Pratley 29/33 (88%); Amorette Wild 9/12 (75%); Carla Dziwoki 7/9 (78%)

Sunday 3 June	Melbourne Vixens	48 – 40	Adelaide Thunderbirds	Hisense Arena
14:20 (UTC+10:00)	Kate Beveridge 30/36 (83%); Tegan Caldwell 15/20 (75%); Karyn Howarth 3/4 (75%)	Report	Erin Bell ? Carla Borrego ?	Attendance: 7,212

Sunday 3 June	Canterbury Tactix	47 – 54	Central Pulse	CBS Canterbury Arena
19:20 (UTC+12:00)	Ellen Halpenny 20; Joanne Harten 27	Report	Paula Griffin 17; Caitlin Thwaites 37/40 (93%)

Monday 4 June	Waikato Bay of Plenty Magic	66 – 47	Southern Steel	Claudelands Arena
19:40 (UTC+12:00)	Julianna Naoupu 27; Irene van Dyk 39	Report	Jodi Brown 26; Donna Wilkins 12; Te Paea Selby-Rickit 9

BYES: West Coast Fever and Northern Mystics

=== Round 11 ===
Sunday 10 June	Adelaide Thunderbirds	54 – 49	Queensland Firebirds	Netball SA Stadium
13:40 (UTC+09:30)	Erin Bell 19/21 (90%); Carla Borrego 35/35 (100%)	Report	Romelda Aiken ? Natalie Medhurst ?

Sunday 10 June	West Coast Fever	49 – 51	New South Wales Swifts	Challenge Stadium
12:20 (UTC+08:00)	Caitlin Bassett 34/40 (85%); Catherine Cox 15/24 (63%)	Report; Stats	Susan Pratley 30/37 (81%); Amorette Wild 14/18 (78%); Kimberly Borger 7/11 (64%)

Sunday 10 June	Waikato Bay of Plenty Magic	52 – 42	Central Pulse	TECT Arena
19:20 (UTC+12:00)	Julianna Naoupu 18/23 (78%); Irene van Dyk 34/35 (97%)	Report	Paula Griffin 15/21 (71%); Caitlin Thwaites 27/34 (79%)

Monday 11 June	Northern Mystics	60 – 49	Southern Steel	Trusts Stadium
19:40 (UTC+12:00)	Catherine Latu 22/23 (96%); Grace Rasmussen ? Maria Tutaia 33/39 (85%)	Report	Jodi Brown ? Donna Wilkins ?

BYES: Melbourne Vixens and Canterbury Tactix

=== Round 12 ===
Sunday 17 June	Melbourne Vixens	50 – 49	West Coast Fever	Hisense Arena
12:10 (UTC+10:00)	Kate Beveridge 3/6 (50%); Tegan Caldwell 14/16 (88%); Karyn Howarth 28/33 (85%)	Report; Stats	Caitlin Bassett 32/35 (91%); Catherine Cox ?

Sunday 17 June	New South Wales Swifts	35 – 62	Adelaide Thunderbirds	Sydney Olympic Park Sports Centre
14:20 (UTC+10:00)	Susan Pratley 6/1 (600%); Amorette Wild 12/14 (86%); Carla Dziwoki 17/21 (81%)	Stats	Carla Borrego 44/48 (92%); Erin Bell 16/19 (84%); Cody Lange 2/3 (67%)

Sunday 17 June	Northern Mystics	46 – 48	Waikato Bay of Plenty Magic	Trusts Stadium
19:20 (UTC+12:00)		Report

Monday 18 June	Southern Steel	61 – 62	Canterbury Tactix	Invercargill ILT Velodrome
19:40 (UTC+12:00)	Jodi Brown 24/28 (86%); Donna Wilkins 37/39 (95%)	Report	Ellen Halpenny 21/26 (81%); Joanne Harten 41/44 (93%)

BYES: Queensland Firebirds and Central Pulse

=== Round 13 ===
Saturday 23 June	Waikato Bay of Plenty Magic	59 – 42	Adelaide Thunderbirds	TECT Arena
16:20 (UTC+12:00)	Julianna Naoupu 18/23 (78%); Irene van Dyk 41/42 (98%)	Report	Erin Bell; Carla Borrego

Sunday 24 June	New South Wales Swifts	55 – 42	Southern Steel	Sydney Olympic Park Sports Centre
12:10 (UTC+10:00)	Susan Pratley 36/43 (84%); Amorette Wild 7/9 (78%); Carla Dziwoki 12/13 (92%)	Report; Stats	Jodi Brown 15/19 (79%); Donna Wilkins 22/24 (92%); Te Paea Selby-Rickit 5/7 (71%)

Sunday 24 June	Queensland Firebirds	63 – 43	West Coast Fever	Brisbane Convention and Exhibition Centre
14:20 (UTC+10:00)	Romelda Aiken; Natalie Medhurst 38	Report	Caitlin Bassett 35; Catherine Cox

Sunday 24 June	Canterbury Tactix	55 – 64	Northern Mystics	CBS Canterbury Arena
19:20 (UTC+12:00)

Monday 25 June	Central Pulse	41 – 49	Melbourne Vixens	Te Rauparaha Arena
19:40 (UTC+12:00)	Paula Griffin; Caitlin Thwaites	Report	Tegan Caldwell 12/14 (86%); Karyn Howarth 37/42 (88%)

=== Round 14 ===
Saturday 30 June	Southern Steel	38 – 56	Melbourne Vixens	Invercargill ILT Velodrome
16:20 (UTC+12:00)	Jodi Brown ? Donna Wilkins ? Te Paea Selby-Rickit ?	Report	Kate Beveridge 4/4 (100%); Tegan Caldwell 26/28 (93%); Karyn Howarth 26/30 (87%)

Sunday 1 July	Adelaide Thunderbirds	65 – 44	Canterbury Tactix	Netball SA Stadium
13:40 (UTC+09:30)	Erin Bell ? Carla Borrego 34/37 (92%)	Report	Ellen Halpenny ? Joanne Harten ?

Sunday 1 July	West Coast Fever	40 – 38	Central Pulse	Challenge Stadium
12:20 (UTC+08:00)	Caitlin Bassett 15/23 (65%); Catherine Cox 21/33 (64%) ? 4 ?	Report	Paula Griffin ? Caitlin Thwaites 27/31 (87%)

Sunday 1 July	Northern Mystics	50 – 49	New South Wales Swifts	Trusts Stadium
19:20 (UTC+12:00)	Cathrine Latu 26/26 (100%); Maria Tutaia 24/32 (75%)	Report; Stats	Susan Pratley 32/34 (94%); Amorette Wild 12/14 (86%); Carla Dziwoki 5/5 (100%)

Monday 2 July	Waikato Bay of Plenty Magic	53 – 43	Queensland Firebirds	Claudelands Arena
19:40 (UTC+12:00)		Report

=== Final table ===
2012 ANZ Championship ladder
Pos	Team	Pld	W	L	GF	GA	GD	G%	Pts
1	Melbourne Vixens	13	10	3	645	569	76	113.36	20
2	Northern Mystics	13	10	3	667	633	34	105.37	20
3	Waikato Bay of Plenty Magic	13	9	4	699	594	105	117.68	18
4	Adelaide Thunderbirds	13	9	4	670	589	81	113.75	18
5	New South Wales Swifts	13	8	5	624	638	-14	97.81	16
6	Queensland Firebirds	13	7	6	686	640	46	107.19	14
7	Central Pulse	13	5	8	585	626	-41	93.45	10
8	West Coast Fever	13	3	10	608	673	-65	90.34	6
9	Southern Steel	13	2	11	639	728	-89	87.77	4
10	Canterbury Tactix	13	2	11	634	767	-133	82.66	4
Updated 28 March 2021

Qualified for Major semi-final
Qualified for Minor semi-final

- Pld = Games played
- W = Win (2 points)
- L = Loss (0 points)
- GF = Goals For
- GA = Goals Against
- GD = Goals Difference (= GF−GA)
- G% = Goal percentage (= 100 × GF/GA)

Pts = Points

== Finals ==
Semifinals
8 July – Rod Laver Arena
Melbourne Vixens	56
Northern Mystics	50
9 July – Claudelands Arena
Waikato Bay of Plenty Magic	49
Adelaide Thunderbirds	48

Preliminary final
16 July – Trusts Stadium
Northern Mystics	48
Waikato Bay of Plenty Magic	57

Grand final
22 July – Hisense Arena
Melbourne Vixens	38
Waikato Bay of Plenty Magic	41

=== Major semi-final ===
Sunday 8 July; 14:20 (UTC+10)	Stats	Melbourne Vixens	56–50	Northern Mystics	Rod Laver Arena
Sunday 8 July; 14:20 (UTC+10)	Stats	Scoring by quarter: 11-15, 13-14, 16-11, 16-10			Rod Laver Arena
Sunday 8 July; 14:20 (UTC+10)	Stats	Karyn Howarth 33/40 (83%); Tegan Caldwell 23/26 (88%)		Cathrine Latu 30/32 (94%); Maria Tutaia 20/23 (87%)	Rod Laver Arena

=== Minor semi-final ===
Monday 9 July; 19:20 (UTC+12)	Stats	Waikato Bay of Plenty Magic	49–48	Adelaide Thunderbirds	Claudelands Arena
Monday 9 July; 19:20 (UTC+12)	Stats	Scoring by quarter: 15-7, 8-19, 15-13, 11-9			Claudelands Arena
Monday 9 July; 19:20 (UTC+12)	Stats	Irene van Dyk 28/28 (100%); Julianna Naoupu 21/23 (91%)		Erin Bell 26/29 (90%); Carla Borrego 22/30 (73%)	Claudelands Arena

=== Preliminary final ===
Monday 16 July; 19:40 (UTC+12)	Stats	Northern Mystics	48–57	Waikato Bay of Plenty Magic	ET	Trusts Stadium
Monday 16 July; 19:40 (UTC+12)	Stats	Scoring by quarter: 12-12, 11-12, 13-10, 8-10, ET: 4-13			ET	Trusts Stadium
Monday 16 July; 19:40 (UTC+12)	Stats	Cathrine Latu 23/23 (100%); Maria Tutaia 25/35 (71%)		Irene van Dyk 35/40 (88%); Julianna Naoupu 22/34 (65%)	ET	Trusts Stadium

=== Grand final ===
Sunday 22 July; 14:30 (UTC+10)	Melbourne Vixens	38–41	Waikato Bay of Plenty Magic	Hisense Arena; Attendance: 10,500
Sunday 22 July; 14:30 (UTC+10)	Scoring by quarter: 8-7, 14-11, 9-10, 7-13			Hisense Arena; Attendance: 10,500
Sunday 22 July; 14:30 (UTC+10)	Karyn Howarth 22/29 (76%); Tegan Caldwell 16/26 (62%)		Irene van Dyk 25/26 (96%); Julianna Naoupu 16/24 (67%)	Hisense Arena; Attendance: 10,500

== Season statistics ==
Top 5 Goals scored
Pos.	Player	Team	GS	GA	G%
1	Irene van Dyk	Waikato Bay of Plenty Magic	501	527	95.1
2	Carla Borrego	Adelaide Thunderbirds	447	510	87.6
3	Romelda Aiken	Queensland Firebirds	426	511	83.4
4	Caitlin Bassett	West Coast Fever	417	472	88.3
5	Caitlin Thwaites	Central Pulse	402	469	85.7

Top 5 Goal assists
Pos.	Player	Team	G/A
1	Madison Browne	Melbourne Vixens	258
2	Laura Langman	Waikato Bay of Plenty Magic	238
3	Temepara George	Northern Mystics	186
4	Emily Beaton	Adelaide Thunderbirds	168
5	Jodi Brown	Southern Steel	128

Top 5 Rebounds
Pos.	Player	Team	Reb.
1	Romelda Aiken	Queensland Firebirds	48
2	Leana de Bruin	Waikato Bay of Plenty Magic	43
3	Irene van Dyk	Waikato Bay of Plenty Magic	41
4	Carla Borrego	Adelaide Thunderbirds	39
5	Laura Geitz	Queensland Firebirds	37

Top 5 Centre-pass receives
Pos.	Player	Team	CPR
1	Madison Browne	Melbourne Vixens	301
2	Julianna Naoupu	Waikato Bay of Plenty Magic	298
3	Khao Watts	Waikato Bay of Plenty Magic	261
4	Natalie Medhurst	Queensland Firebirds	226
5	Catherine Cox	West Coast Fever	223

Top 5 Intercepts
Pos.	Player	Team	Int.
1	Geva Mentor	Melbourne Vixens	38
2	Sharni Layton	Adelaide Thunderbirds	35
3=	Anna Harrison	Northern Mystics	32
3=	Katrina Grant	Central Pulse	32
5	Leana de Bruin	Waikato Bay of Plenty Magic	30

Top 5 Deflections
Pos.	Player	Team	Defl.
1	Geva Mentor	Melbourne Vixens	108
2	Leana de Bruin	Waikato Bay of Plenty Magic	80
3	Sharni Layton	Adelaide Thunderbirds	72
4	Casey Williams	Waikato Bay of Plenty Magic	62
5=	Demelza McCloud	Southern Steel	60
5=	Anna Harrison	Northern Mystics	60

Top 5 Penalties
Pos.	Player	Team	Pen.
1	Geva Mentor	Melbourne Vixens	237
2	Laura Geitz	Queensland Firebirds	228
3	Sharni Layton	Adelaide Thunderbirds	223
4	Elizabeth Manu	Central Pulse	209
5	Leana De Bruin	Waikato Bay of Plenty Magic	207

Top 5 Turnovers
Pos.	Player	Team	Turn.
1	Carla Borrego	Adelaide Thunderbirds	72
2	Cathrine Latu	Northern Mystics	59
3	Catherine Cox	West Coast Fever	53
4=	Emily Beaton	Adelaide Thunderbirds	51
4=	Maria Tutaia	Northern Mystics	51
4=	Romelda Aiken	Queensland Firebirds	51

== Award winners ==
=== ANZ Championship awards ===
Award	Winner	Team
ANZ Championship Most Valuable Player	(New Zealand) Temepara George ^{(Note 1)}	Northern Mystics
ANZ Championship Most Valuable Player	(New Zealand) Laura Langman ^{(Note 1)}	Waikato Bay of Plenty Magic
ANZ Championship Grand Final MVP	(New Zealand) Leana de Bruin	Waikato Bay of Plenty Magic
Best Young Player	(New Zealand) Julianna Naoupu	Waikato Bay of Plenty Magic

Notes

- ^1 Temepara George and Laura Langman shared the MVP Award

=== All Star Team ===
Position	Player	Team
GS	(New Zealand) Irene van Dyk	Waikato Bay of Plenty Magic
GA	(New Zealand) Maria Tutaia	Northern Mystics
WA	(Australia) Madison Browne	Melbourne Vixens
C	(New Zealand) Laura Langman	Waikato Bay of Plenty Magic
WD	(Australia) Julie Corletto	Melbourne Vixens
GD	(New Zealand) Casey Williams	Waikato Bay of Plenty Magic
GK	(England) Geva Mentor	Melbourne Vixens
Coach	(New Zealand) Noeline Taurua	Waikato Bay of Plenty Magic

=== Australian Netball Awards ===
Award	Winner	Team
Australian ANZ Championship Player of the Year	(Australia) Madison Browne	Melbourne Vixens
Liz Ellis Diamond	(Australia) Madison Browne	Melbourne Vixens
Australian ANZ Championship Coach of the Year	(Australia) Julie Hoornweg	Melbourne Vixens

== Media coverage ==
A cumulative television audience of over 10.6 million across Australia and New Zealand watched the 2012 ANZ Championship on Network 10 and Sky Sport (New Zealand), representing a 45% increase on 2011 (7.2million).
