= 2012 New South Wales Swifts season =

NSW Swifts season

New South Wales Swifts
- 2012 season
- Head coach: Lisa Beehag
- Asst. coach: Robert Wright
- Manager: Rebecca Pollard
- Co-captains: Mo'onia Gerrard; Kimberlee Green
- Vice-captain: Susan Pratley
- Main venue: Sydney Olympic Park Sports Centre

Season results
- Wins–losses: 8–5
- Regular season: 5th
- Finals placing: Did not qualify
- Team colours

New South Wales Swifts seasons
- ← 2011 2013 →

The 2012 New South Wales Swifts season saw New South Wales Swifts compete in the 2012 ANZ Championship. They were coached by Lisa Beehag, a former Australia international. During the 2011 season, Beehag had served as head coach of NNSW Blues in the Australian Netball League. During the regular season, Swifts finished in fifth place and failed to qualify for the playoffs. They narrowly missed out on the playoffs after a 50–49 defeat to Northern Mystics in their final regular season match.

== Players ==
=== Player movements ===
Summary of 2012 player movements
▲ Gains	▼ Losses
Kimberley Borger (NNSW Blues) ^{(Note 1)}; Kristy Guthrie (NNSW Waratahs); Paige Hadley (NNSW Waratahs/AIS); April Letton (NNSW Waratahs/Queensland Firebirds); Samantha May (NNSW Waratahs); Joanna Sutton (Adelaide Thunderbirds); Gabi Simpson (NNSW Blues/AIS); Melissa Tallent (NNSW Waratahs)	Ashleigh Brazill (West Coast Fever); Rebecca Bulley (Adelaide Thunderbirds); Catherine Cox (West Coast Fever); Kimberley Smith (retired); Courtney Tairi (Southern Steel)

Notes

- ^1 Kimberley Borger was named in the 2010 roster but withdrew due to injury.

=== 2012 roster ===
2012 New South Wales Swifts roster
Players
Coaching staff

Nat.	Name	Position(s)	DoB	Height
(Australia)	Kimberly Borger	GA, GS	15 September 1988 (aged 23)	1.80 m (5 ft 11 in)
(Australia)	Carla Dziwoki	GS, GA	29 August 1982 (aged 29)	1.86 m (6 ft 1 in)
(Australia)	Mo'onia Gerrard (cc)	GD, WD	15 November 1980 (aged 31)	1.80 m (5 ft 11 in)
(Australia)	Kimberlee Green (cc)	C, WA	5 March 1986 (aged 26)	1.76 m (5 ft 9 in)
(Australia)	Kristy Guthrie	WA, C	8 July 1988 (aged 23)	1.72 m (5 ft 8 in)
(Australia)	Paige Hadley (TRP)	C, WA, WD	26 August 1992 (aged 19)	1.73 m (5 ft 8 in)
(Australia)	April Letton	GK, GD	19 April 1990 (aged 21)	1.85 m (6 ft 1 in)
(Australia)	Samantha May	GD, WD	16 September 1987 (aged 24)	1.83 m (6 ft 0 in)
(England)	Sonia Mkoloma	GD, GK	17 January 1979 (aged 33)	1.86 m (6 ft 1 in)
(Australia)	Susan Pratley (vc)	GA, GS	23 March 1984 (aged 28)	1.80 m (5 ft 11 in)
(Australia)	Gabi Simpson (TRP)	WD, GD, C	17 October 1992 (aged 19)	1.76 m (5 ft 9 in)
(Australia)	Joanna Sutton	WD, C	13 July 1986 (aged 25)	1.80 m (5 ft 11 in)
(Australia)	Melissa Tallent (TRP)	GS, GA	4 February 1991 (aged 21)	1.87 m (6 ft 2 in)
(Australia)	Vanessa Ware	WA, C	26 October 1985 (aged 26)	1.71 m (5 ft 7 in)
(Australia)	Amorette Wild	GA, GS, WA	10 August 1989 (aged 22)	1.78 m (5 ft 10 in)

Head coach

- (Australia) Lisa Beehag

Assistant coach

- (Australia) Robert Wright

Manager: Rebecca Pollard
High Performance Coach:
Sue Hawkins
Physiotherapist:
Brett Doring
Paula Peralta
Sean Mungovan
Strength and conditioning:
Jason Schulman

Notes

- (c) – Captain
- (cc) – Co-captain
- (vc) – Vice-captain
- – Injury / maternity leave
- (TRP) – Temporary Replacement Player

=== Player milestones ===
- Kimberlee Green and Vanessa Ware celebrated ten consecutive seasons with Sydney Swifts/New South Wales Swifts. Ware subsequently played her 50th ANZ Championship match in Round 9 against Melbourne Vixens.
- Kimberly Borger, Paige Hadley, April Letton and Joanna Sutton all make their Swifts ANZ Championship debut in Round 1 against Adelaide Thunderbirds
- Susan Pratley scores her 1600th goal in Round 11 against West Coast Fever.

== Tauranga Pre-Season Tournament ==
On 2, 3 and 4 March, Waikato Bay of Plenty Magic hosted a pre-season tournament at the TECT Arena in Tauranga. For the first time since 2008, all ten ANZ Championship teams competed at the same tournament. The ten teams were divided into two pools of five. Teams within each pool played each other once and the winners qualified for the final. Swifts finished the tournament in 8th place.

7th/8th place play-off

Sunday 4 March	Adelaide Thunderbirds	42–34	New South Wales Swifts	TECT Arena

== Regular season ==
=== Fixtures and results ===
Round 1

Saturday 31 March	Adelaide Thunderbirds	57 – 40	New South Wales Swifts	Netball SA Stadium
13:50 (UTC+10:30)	Erin Bell 16/24 (67%); Carla Borrego 41/48 (85%)	Report; Stats	Kimberly Borger 3/6 (50%); Carla Dziwoki 16/20 (80%); Susan Pratley 21/26 (81%)

Round 2

Monday 9 April	Canterbury Tactix	54 – 51	New South Wales Swifts	CBS Canterbury Arena
19:40 (UTC+12:00)	Ellen Halpenny 13/19 (68%); Joanne Harten 38/46 (83%); Anna Thompson 3/5 (60%)	Stats	Carla Dziwoki 27/32 (84%); Susan Pratley 24/27 (89%)

Round 3

Monday 16 April	New South Wales Swifts	49 – 47	Waikato Bay of Plenty Magic	Sydney Olympic Park Sports Centre
19:40 (UTC+10:00)	Carla Dziwoki 23/25 (92%); Susan Pratley 26/31 (84%)	Stats	Julianna Naoupu 23/28 (82%); Irene van Dyk 24/25 (96%)	Attendance: 3,665

Round 4

Sunday 22 April	New South Wales Swifts	54 – 49	Queensland Firebirds	Sydney Olympic Park Sports Centre
14:20 (UTC+10:00)	Carla Dziwoki 14/17 (82%); Susan Pratley 30/34 (88%); Amorette Wild 10/12 (83%)	Stats	Romelda Aiken 30/39 (77%); Natalie Medhurst 19/22 (86%)

Round 5

New South Wales Swifts received a bye.

Round 6

Sunday 6 May	New South Wales Swifts	39 – 36	Central Pulse	Sydney Olympic Park Sports Centre
12:10 (UTC+10:00)	Kimberly Borger 5/6 (83%); Carla Dziwoki 3/5 (60%); Susan Pratley 20/22 (91%); Amorette Wild 11/15 (73%)	Stats	Paula Griffin 4/5 (80%); Jamilah Gupwell 2/6 (33%); Caitlin Thwaites 30/37 (81%)

Round 7

Sunday 13 May	New South Wales Swifts	55 – 52	Melbourne Vixens	Allphones Arena
14:20 (UTC+10:00)	Carla Dziwoki 14/19 (74%); Susan Pratley 31/34 (91%); Amorette Wild 10/13 (77%)	Stats	Kate Beveridge 4/4 (100%); Tegan Caldwell 23/26 (88%); Karyn Howarth 25/31 (81%)

Round 8

Sunday 20 May	New South Wales Swifts	52 – 47	West Coast Fever	Newcastle Entertainment Centre
14:20 (UTC+10:00)	Carla Dziwoki 8/11 (73%); Susan Pratley 32/39 (82%); Amorette Wild 12/14 (86%)	Stats	Caitlin Bassett 43/48 (90%); Catherine Cox 4/8 (50%)

Round 9

Sunday 27 May	Melbourne Vixens	43 – 49	New South Wales Swifts	Hisense Arena
14:20 (UTC+10:00)	Kate Beveridge 18/22 (82%); Tegan Caldwell 11/11 (100%); Karyn Howarth 14/16 (88%)	Stats	Carla Dziwoki 4/6 (67%); Susan Pratley 32/37 (86%); Amorette Wild 13/16 (81%)

Round 10

Sunday 3 June	Queensland Firebirds	50 – 45	New South Wales Swifts	Brisbane Convention and Exhibition Centre
12:10 (UTC+10:00)	Romelda Aiken 38/43 (88%); Natalie Medhurst 12/20 (60%)	Report	Susan Pratley 29/33 (88%); Amorette Wild 9/12 (75%); Carla Dziwoki 7/9 (78%)

Round 11

Sunday 10 June	West Coast Fever	49 – 51	New South Wales Swifts	Challenge Stadium
12:20 (UTC+08:00)	Caitlin Bassett 34/40 (85%); Catherine Cox 15/24 (63%)	Report; Stats	Susan Pratley 30/37 (81%); Amorette Wild 14/18 (78%); Kimberly Borger 7/11 (64%)

Round 12

Sunday 17 June	New South Wales Swifts	35 – 62	Adelaide Thunderbirds	Sydney Olympic Park Sports Centre
14:20 (UTC+10:00)	Susan Pratley 6/1 (600%); Amorette Wild 12/14 (86%); Carla Dziwoki 17/21 (81%)	Stats	Carla Borrego 44/48 (92%); Erin Bell 16/19 (84%); Cody Lange 2/3 (67%)

Round 13

Sunday 24 June	New South Wales Swifts	55 – 42	Southern Steel	Sydney Olympic Park Sports Centre
12:10 (UTC+10:00)	Susan Pratley 36/43 (84%); Amorette Wild 7/9 (78%); Carla Dziwoki 12/13 (92%)	Report; Stats	Jodi Brown 15/19 (79%); Donna Wilkins 22/24 (92%); Te Paea Selby-Rickit 5/7 (71%)

Round 14

Sunday 1 July	Northern Mystics	50 – 49	New South Wales Swifts	Trusts Stadium
19:20 (UTC+12:00)	Cathrine Latu 26/26 (100%); Maria Tutaia 24/32 (75%)	Report; Stats	Susan Pratley 32/34 (94%); Amorette Wild 12/14 (86%); Carla Dziwoki 5/5 (100%)

=== Final table ===
2012 ANZ Championship ladder
Pos	Team	Pld	W	L	GF	GA	GD	G%	Pts
1	Melbourne Vixens	13	10	3	645	569	76	113.36	20
2	Northern Mystics	13	10	3	667	633	34	105.37	20
3	Waikato Bay of Plenty Magic	13	9	4	699	594	105	117.68	18
4	Adelaide Thunderbirds	13	9	4	670	589	81	113.75	18
5	New South Wales Swifts	13	8	5	624	638	-14	97.81	16
6	Queensland Firebirds	13	7	6	686	640	46	107.19	14
7	Central Pulse	13	5	8	585	626	-41	93.45	10
8	West Coast Fever	13	3	10	608	673	-65	90.34	6
9	Southern Steel	13	2	11	639	728	-89	87.77	4
10	Canterbury Tactix	13	2	11	634	767	-133	82.66	4
Updated 28 March 2021

Qualified for Major semi-final
Qualified for Minor semi-final

- Pld = Games played
- W = Win (2 points)
- L = Loss (0 points)
- GF = Goals For
- GA = Goals Against
- GD = Goals Difference (= GF−GA)
- G% = Goal percentage (= 100 × GF/GA)

Pts = Points

== Statistics ==
As of 14 November 2012.
Player	GS	GA	G%	A	R	CPR	I	D	P	T
Kimberly Borger	15	23	65.2	2	3	0	0	0	4	2
Carla Dziwoki	139	172	80.8	24	10	47	3	6	31	20
Mo'onia Gerrard	0	0	0	2	16	94	10	22	168	16
Kimberlee Green	0	0	0	123	0	78	6	16	108	26
Kristy Guthrie	0	0	0	12	0	0	0	0	8	2
Paige Hadley	0	0	0	20	0	12	1	3	16	4
April Letton	0	0	0	0	10	0	4	9	46	5
Samantha May	0	0	0	1	0	46	6	14	97	9
Sonia Mkoloma	0	0	0	0	17	14	19	47	186	11
Susan Pratley	347	405	85.7	47	13	36	4	5	33	35
Joanna Sutton	0	0	0	0	0	19	5	16	64	4
Vanessa Ware	0	0	0	94	0	140	5	5	30	40
Amorette Wild	111	138	80.4	33	2	82	2	6	30	14

Statistics key
GS	Goals scored	A	Assists	I	Intercepts
GA	Goal attempts	R	Rebounds	D	Deflections
G%	Goal percentage	CPR	Centre pass receives	P	Penalties
= Competition leader				T	Turnovers conceded

== Award winners ==
Award	Winner
QBE NSW Swifts MVP	Susan Pratley
NSW Swifts Members' Player of the Year	Kimberlee Green
NSW Swifts Players' Player of the Year	April Letton
