= 2013 New South Wales Swifts season =

NSW Swifts season

New South Wales Swifts
- 2013 season
- Head coach: Lisa Beehag
- Asst. coach: Rob Wright
- Manager: Toni Kidwell
- Captain: Mo'onia Gerrard; Kimberlee Green
- Vice-captain: Susan Pettitt
- Main venue: Sydney Olympic Park Sports Centre

Season results
- Wins–losses: 4–9
- Regular season: 8th
- Finals placing: Did not qualify
- Team colours

New South Wales Swifts seasons
- ← 2012 2014 →

The 2013 New South Wales Swifts season saw New South Wales Swifts compete in the 2013 ANZ Championship. During the regular season they finished eighth with a 4–9 record and did not qualify for the play-offs. During the season they defeated West Coast Fever, Northern Mystics, Canterbury Tactix and Melbourne Vixens.

== Players ==
=== 2013 roster ===
2013 New South Wales Swifts roster
Players
Coaching staff

Nat.	Name	Position(s)	DoB	Height
(Australia)	Kaitlyn Bryce (TRP)			–
(Australia)	Carla Dziwoki	GS, GA	29 August 1982 (aged 30)	1.86 m (6 ft 1 in)
(Australia)	Mo'onia Gerrard (cc)	GD, WD	15 November 1980 (aged 32)	1.80 m (5 ft 11 in)
(Australia)	Kimberlee Green (cc)	C, WA	5 March 1986 (aged 27)	1.76 m (5 ft 9 in)
(Australia)	Paige Hadley	C, WA, WD	26 August 1992 (aged 20)	1.73 m (5 ft 8 in)
(Australia)	April Letton	GK, GD	19 April 1990 (aged 22)	1.85 m (6 ft 1 in)
(Australia)	Samantha May	GD, WD	16 September 1987 (aged 25)	1.83 m (6 ft 0 in)
(Australia)	Kristiana Manu'a (TRP)	GD, GK	3 September 1995 (aged 17)	1.82 m (6 ft 0 in)
(England)	Sonia Mkoloma	GD, GK	17 January 1979 (aged 34)	1.86 m (6 ft 1 in)
(Australia)	Susan Pettitt (vc)	GA, GS	23 March 1984 (aged 29)	1.80 m (5 ft 11 in)
(Australia)	Melissa Tallent	GS, GA	4 February 1991 (aged 22)	1.87 m (6 ft 2 in)
(Australia)	Vanessa Ware	WA, C	26 October 1985 (aged 27)	1.71 m (5 ft 7 in)
(Australia)	Ashlee Weir	WD, C, WA	29 April 1988 (aged 24)	1.76 m (5 ft 9 in)
(Australia)	Amorette Wild	GA, GS, WA	10 August 1989 (aged 23)	1.78 m (5 ft 10 in)

Head coach

- (Australia) Lisa Beehag

Assistant coach

- (Australia) Robert Wright

Manager: Toni Kidwell
Physiotherapist:
Paula Peralta
Brett Doring
Daniel Vukovic
Sports science:
Dr Grace Bryant
Strength and conditioning:
Damien Austin

Notes

- (c) – Captain
- (cc) – Co-captain
- (vc) – Vice-captain
- – Injury / maternity leave
- (TRP) – Temporary Replacement Player

=== Milestones ===
- Melissa Tallent made her ANZ Championship debut in Round 5 against West Coast Fever.
- Vanessa Ware played her 100th game for Sydney Swifts/New South Wales Swifts against Southern Steel in Round 7. After 107 games and 11 seasons, Ware retired from elite netball after the Round 14 game against Canterbury Tactix.
- Susan Pettitt played her 150th elite netball game in Round 13 against Queensland Firebirds.

== Melbourne Vixens Summer Challenge ==
The main pre-season event was the Summer Challenge, hosted by Melbourne Vixens at the State Netball Hockey Centre on 23 and 24 February.

Saturday 23 February	New South Wales Swifts	28–35	Adelaide Thunderbirds	State Netball Hockey Centre

Saturday 23 February	New South Wales Swifts	45–34	Canterbury Tactix	State Netball Hockey Centre

Sunday 24 February	Southern Steel	36–35	New South Wales Swifts	State Netball Hockey Centre

Sunday 24 February	Queensland Firebirds	30–29	New South Wales Swifts	State Netball Hockey Centre

== Regular season ==
=== Fixtures and results ===
Round 1

Monday 25 March	New South Wales Swifts	55 – 41	West Coast Fever	Sydney Olympic Park Sports Centre
7:40 pm	Carla Dziwoki 18/21 (86%); Susan Pratley 32/38 (84%); Amorette Wild 5/6 (83%)	Stats	Caitlin Bassett 3/5 (60%); Kate Beveridge 7/13 (54%); Catherine Cox 29/36 (81%); Lisa Millman 2/2 (100%)

Round 2

Sunday 31 March	Waikato Bay of Plenty Magic	61 – 35	New South Wales Swifts	ASB Baypark Arena
7:20 pm	Ellen Halpenny 12/18 (67%); Irene van Dyk 32/33 (97%); Jessica Waitapu 17/20 (85%)	Stats	Carla Dziwoki 10/14 (71%); Susan Pratley 23/29 (79%); Amorette Wild 2/4 (50%)

Round 3

Monday 8 April	Central Pulse	55 – 49	New South Wales Swifts	TSB Bank Arena
7:40 pm	Caitlin Thwaites 30/32 (94%); Donna Wilkins 25/27 (93%)	Stats	Susan Pratley 26/30 (87%); Carla Dziwoki 21/24 (88%); Amorette Wild 2/2 (100%)

Round 4

Monday 15 April	New South Wales Swifts	53 – 61	Queensland Firebirds	Sydney Olympic Park Sports Centre
7:40 pm	Susan Pratley 34/43 (79%); Amorette Wild 19/23 (83%)	Stats	Romelda Aiken 38/39 (97%); Natalie Medhurst 23/27 (85%)

Round 5

Sunday 21 April	West Coast Fever	71 – 51	New South Wales Swifts	Challenge Stadium
12:10 pm	Caitlin Bassett 47/55 (85%); Catherine Cox 23/26 (88%); Kate Beveridge 1/1 (100%)	Stats	Carla Dziwoki 19/22 (86%); Susan Pratley 14/17 (82%); Amorette Wild 9/11 (82%); Melissa Tallent 9/12 (75%)

Round 6

New South Wales Swifts received a bye.

Round 7

Monday 6 May	Southern Steel	60 – 55	New South Wales Swifts	Stadium Southland Velodrome
7:40 pm	Jhaniele Fowler 59/63 (94%); Jodi Brown 1/3 (33%)	Stats	Susan Pratley 33/34 (97%); Carla Dziwoki 22/27 (81%)

Round 8

Sunday 12 May	New South Wales Swifts	42 – 50	Melbourne Vixens	Sydney Olympic Park Sports Centre
12:10 pm	Carla Dziwoki 19/21 (90%); Susan Pratley 18/25 (72%); Melissa Tallent 5/6 (83%)	Stats	Tegan Caldwell 22/25 (88%); Karyn Howarth 19/23 (83%); Sharelle McMahon 9/14 (64%)

Round 9

Sunday 19 May	Adelaide Thunderbirds	50 – 48	New South Wales Swifts	Netball SA Stadium
1:40 pm	Carla Borrego 30/33 (91%); Erin Bell 20/27 (74%)	Stats	Melissa Tallent 10/11 (91%); Susan Pratley 29/35 (83%); Carla Dziwoki 9/12 (75%)

Round 10

Sunday 26 May	New South Wales Swifts	63 – 44	Northern Mystics	Sydney Olympic Park Sports Centre
12:10 pm	Susan Pratley 40/45 (89%); Carla Dziwoki 21/26 (81%); Melissa Tallent 2/3 (67%)	Report; Stats	Bailey Mes 13/16 (81%); Maria Tutaia 19/23 (83%); Cathrine Latu 12/14 (86%)

Round 11

Sunday 2 June	New South Wales Swifts	43 – 46	Adelaide Thunderbirds	Allphones Arena
12:10 pm	Susan Pratley 26/29 (90%); Carla Dziwoki 14/16 (88%); Melissa Tallent 3/5 (60%)	Report; Stats	Carla Borrego 31/33 (94%); Erin Bell 15/16 (94%)

Round 12

Saturday 8 June	Melbourne Vixens	39 – 48	New South Wales Swifts	Hisense Arena
2:10 pm	Karyn Howarth 7/8 (88%); Sharelle McMahon 10/15 (67%); Tegan Caldwell 22/26 (85%)	Stats	Carla Dziwoki 25/32 (78%); Susan Pratley 23/37 (62%)

Round 13

Sunday 16 June	Queensland Firebirds	52 – 48	New South Wales Swifts	Brisbane Convention and Exhibition Centre
12:10 pm	Romelda Aiken 37/40 (93%); Natalie Medhurst 15/17 (88%)	Stats	Susan Pratley 30/37 (81%); Carla Dziwoki 18/20 (90%)

Round 14

Monday 24 June	New South Wales Swifts	62 – 42	Canterbury Tactix	Sydney Olympic Park Sports Centre
7:40 pm	Susan Pettitt 39/42 (93%); Carla Dziwoki 12/14 (86%); Amorette Wild 3/7 (43%); Melissa Tallent 8/12 (67%)	Stats	Joanne Harten 25/34 (74%); Julianna Naoupu 12/17 (71%); Sophia Fenwick 5/9 (56%)

=== Final table ===
2013 ANZ Championship ladder
Pos	Team	Pld	W	L	GF	GA	GD	G%	Pts
1	Adelaide Thunderbirds	13	12	1	688	620	+68	111.0	24
2	Melbourne Vixens	13	9	4	692	589	+103	117.5	18
3	Waikato Bay of Plenty Magic	13	9	4	749	650	+99	115.2	18
4	Queensland Firebirds	13	9	4	793	691	+102	114.8	18
5	Central Pulse	13	8	5	736	706	+30	104.2	16
6	Southern Steel	13	6	7	812	790	+22	102.8	12
7	West Coast Fever	13	5	8	715	757	−42	94.5	10
8	New South Wales Swifts	13	4	9	652	672	−20	97.0	8
9	Canterbury Tactix	13	2	11	700	882	−182	79.4	4
10	Northern Mystics	13	1	12	699	879	−180	79.5	2
Updated 7 April 2021

Qualified for Major semi-final
Qualified for Minor semi-final

- Pld = Games played
- W = Win (2 points)
- L = Loss (0 points)
- GF = Goals For
- GA = Goals Against
- GD = Goals Difference (= GF−GA)
- G% = Goal percentage (= 100 × GF/GA)

Pts = Points

== Statistics ==
- As of Sunday 17 November 2013

Player	GS	GA	G%	A	R	CPR	I	D	P	T
Carla Dziwoki	208	249	83.5	42	16	61	2	5	35	49
Mo'onia Gerrard	0	0	0	0	6	84	10	21	145	14
Kimberlee Green	0	0	0	133	0	52	9	18	92	30
Paige Hadley	0	0	0	55	0	43	6	10	66	15
April Letton	0	0	0	0	15	9	11	36	84	3
Samantha May	0	0	0	0	0	15	1	5	23	1
Sonia Mkoloma	0	0	0	0	11	30	26	45	228	4
Susan Pettitt	367	451	81.4	55	17	90	4	7	51	75
Melissa Tallent	37	48	77.1	6	1	0	0	2	3	12
Vanessa Ware	0	0	0	104	0	164	2	6	25	22
Ashlee Weir	0	0	0	0	0	21	3	3	50	4
Amorette Wild	40	53	75.5	18	3	32	1	0	11	16

Statistics key
GS	Goals scored	A	Assists	I	Intercepts
GA	Goal attempts	R	Rebounds	D	Deflections
G%	Goal percentage	CPR	Centre pass receives	P	Penalties
= Competition leader				T	Turnovers conceded

== Award winners ==
Award	Winner
QBE NSW Swifts MVP	Kimberlee Green
NSW Swifts Members' Player of the Year	Kimberlee Green
NSW Swifts Players' Player of the Year	Sonia Mkoloma
NSW Swifts Coaches' Player Award	Paige Hadley
