= 2012 Adelaide Thunderbirds season =

Adelaide Thunderbirds season

Adelaide Thunderbirds
- 2012 season
- Head coach: Jane Woodlands-Thompson
- Asst. coach: Dan Ryan; Judy Greenwood; Tania Obst
- Manager: Catherine Foreman
- Co-captains: Sharni Layton; Natalie von Bertouch
- Main venue: Netball SA Stadium

Season results
- Wins–losses: 9–5
- Regular season: 4th
- Finals placing: 4th
- Team colours

Adelaide Thunderbirds seasons
- ← 2011 2013 →

The 2012 Adelaide Thunderbirds season saw Adelaide Thunderbirds compete in the 2012 ANZ Championship. After winning nine games doing the regular season, Thunderbirds finished fourth and qualified for the play-offs. However they subsequently lost the minor semi-final 49–48 to the eventual overall champions, Waikato Bay of Plenty Magic.

== Players ==
=== Jhaniele Fowler ===
In November 2011, Thunderbirds signed Jhaniele Fowler, the Jamaica international. However the deal depended upon Carla Borrego, a former Jamaica international, successfully becoming an Australian citizen and thus freeing up Thunderbirds' export place for Fowler. This did not happen in time for the start of the season and the deal collapsed.

=== Player movements ===
Gains and losses
▲ Gains	▼ Losses
Rebecca Bulley (New South Wales Swifts); Renae Hallinan (Melbourne Vixens); Melissa Rowland (Southern Force); Amehlia Schmidt (Southern Force)	Georgia Beaton (Southern Force); Bianca Giteau; Kara Richards (Melbourne Vixens); Joanna Sutton (New South Wales Swifts)

=== 2012 roster ===
2012 Adelaide Thunderbirds roster
Players
Coaching staff

Nat.	Name	Position(s)	DoB	Height
(Australia)	Emily Beaton	C, WA	9 April 1987 (aged 24)	1.80 m (5 ft 11 in)
(Australia)	Erin Bell	GA, WA, GS	26 October 1985 (aged 26)	1.78 m (5 ft 10 in)
(Jamaica)	Carla Borrego	GA, GS	11 November 1983 (aged 28)	1.93 m (6 ft 4 in)
(Australia)	Natalie von Bertouch (cc)	C, WA, WD	16 December 1982 (aged 29)	1.75 m (5 ft 9 in)
(Australia)	Rebecca Bulley	GD, GK, WD	18 August 1982 (aged 29)	1.86 m (6 ft 1 in)
(Australia)	Renae Hallinan	WD, C	18 July 1986 (aged 25)	1.77 m (5 ft 10 in)
(Australia)	Cody Lange	GS, GA	24 October 1994 (aged 17)	1.84 m (6 ft 0 in)
(Australia)	Sharni Layton (cc)	GK, GD, WD	6 January 1988 (aged 24)	1.88 m (6 ft 2 in)
(Australia)	Maddy Proud	C, WA	4 December 1993 (aged 18)	1.74 m (5 ft 9 in)
(Australia)	Melissa Rowland	GA, GS	18 May 1989 (aged 22)	1.86 m (6 ft 1 in)
(Australia)	Amehlia Schmidt	GD, GK	8 March 1993 (aged 19)	1.84 m (6 ft 0 in)
(Australia)	Kate Shimmin	GK, GD	13 February 1992 (aged 20)	1.85 m (6 ft 1 in)

Head coach

- (Australia) Jane Woodlands-Thompson

Assistant coach

- (Australia) Dan Ryan
  (Australia) Judy Greenwood
  (Australia) Tania Obst

Manager:
Catherine Foreman
Operations Manager:
Rebekah Webster
Physiotherapist:
Andrew Hopkins
Strength and conditioning:
Andrew Maynard
Damian Maynard
Paul Taylor
Paul Beltrame
Performance Analyst:
Catherine Foreman
Doctor:
Dr Angela Moran
Dietician:
Natalie von Bertouch
Chaplain:
Emma George

Notes

- (c) – Captain
- (cc) – Co-captain
- (vc) – Vice-captain
- – Injury / maternity leave
- (TRP) – Temporary Replacement Player

Notes

- ^1 Cody Lange, Maddy Proud, Melissa Rowland and Kate Shimmin were all members of the 2012 Southern Force squad. With a team that was coached by Tania Obst and also featured other past and future Thunderbirds' players Kelly Altmann, Georgia Beaton and Sheree Wingard, Southern Force finished as 2012 Australian Netball League champions, defeating NNSW Waratahs 50–36 in the grand final.
- ^2 Amehlia Schmidt was also in the 2012 Australian Institute of Sport ANL squad.

== Tauranga Pre-Season Tournament ==
On 2, 3 and 4 March, Waikato Bay of Plenty Magic hosted a pre-season tournament at the TECT Arena in Tauranga. For the first time since 2008, all ten ANZ Championship teams competed at the same tournament. The ten teams were divided into two pools of five. Teams within each pool played each other once and the winners qualified for the final. Thunderbirds finished the tournament in 7th place.

7th/8th place play-off

Sunday 4 March	Adelaide Thunderbirds	42–34	New South Wales Swifts	TECT Arena

== Regular season ==
=== Fixtures and results ===
Round 1

Saturday 31 March	Adelaide Thunderbirds	57 – 40	New South Wales Swifts	Netball SA Stadium
13:50 (UTC+10:30)	Erin Bell 16/24 (67%); Carla Borrego 41/48 (85%)	Report; Stats	Kimberly Borger 3/6 (50%); Carla Dziwoki 16/20 (80%); Susan Pratley 21/26 (81%)

Round 2

Sunday 8 April	Queensland Firebirds	44 – 54	Adelaide Thunderbirds	Brisbane Convention and Exhibition Centre
12:10 (UTC+10:00)	Romelda Aiken 34/43 (79%); Natalie Medhurst 10/11 (91%); Chelsea Pitman 0/1 (0%)	Stats	Erin Bell 22/29 (76%); Carla Borrego 32/35 (91%)

Round 3

Sunday 15 April	Adelaide Thunderbirds	34 – 48	Melbourne Vixens	Netball SA Stadium
13:50 (UTC+09:30)	Erin Bell 14/16 (88%); Carla Borrego 20/26 (77%)	Stats	Kate Beveridge 18/23 (78%); Tegan Caldwell 22/23 (96%); Karyn Howarth 8/12 (67%)

Round 4

Sunday 22 April	Northern Mystics	48 – 50	Adelaide Thunderbirds	Trusts Stadium
19:20 (UTC+12:00)	Cathrine Latu 11/11 (100%); Grace Rasmussen 3/4 (75%); Maria Tutaia 34/44 (77%)	Stats	Erin Bell 16/19 (84%); Carla Borrego 34/38 (89%)

Round 5

Sunday 29 April	West Coast Fever	36 – 48	Adelaide Thunderbirds	Challenge Stadium
10:10 (UTC+08:00)	Caitlin Bassett 23/27 (85%); Catherine Cox 8/17 (47%); Sarah East 5/9 (56%)	Stats	Erin Bell 21/28 (75%); Carla Borrego 27/32 (84%)

Round 6

Monday 7 May	Adelaide Thunderbirds	58 – 48	Southern Steel	Netball SA Stadium
19:40 (UTC+09:30)	Erin Bell 18/19 (95%); Carla Borrego 40/46 (87%)	Stats	Jodi Brown 18/25 (72%); Te Paea Selby-Rickit 10/13 (77%); Donna Wilkins 20/23 (87%)

Round 7

Sunday 13 May	Adelaide Thunderbirds	60 – 43	West Coast Fever	Netball SA Stadium
11:40 (UTC+09:30)	Erin Bell 17/22 (77%); Carla Borrego 43/45 (96%)	Stats	Caitlin Bassett 38/42 (90%); Catherine Cox 3/5 (60%); Sarah East 0/2 (0%); Nikala Smith 2/4 (50%)

Round 8

Monday 21 May	Central Pulse	47 – 46	Adelaide Thunderbirds	TSB Bank Arena
19:20 (UTC+12:00)	Paula Griffin 14/20 (70%); Caitlin Thwaites 33/7 (471%)	Stats	Erin Bell 19/22 (86%); Carla Borrego 27/34 (79%)

Round 9

Adelaide Thunderbirds received a bye.

Round 10

Sunday 3 June	Melbourne Vixens	48 – 40	Adelaide Thunderbirds	Hisense Arena
14:20 (UTC+10:00)	Kate Beveridge 30/36 (83%); Tegan Caldwell 15/20 (75%); Karyn Howarth 3/4 (75%)	Report	Erin Bell ? Carla Borrego ?	Attendance: 7,212

Round 11

Sunday 10 June	Adelaide Thunderbirds	54 – 49	Queensland Firebirds	Netball SA Stadium
13:40 (UTC+09:30)	Erin Bell 19/21 (90%); Carla Borrego 35/35 (100%)	Report	Romelda Aiken ? Natalie Medhurst ?

Round 12

Sunday 17 June	New South Wales Swifts	35 – 62	Adelaide Thunderbirds	Sydney Olympic Park Sports Centre
14:20 (UTC+10:00)	Susan Pratley 6/1 (600%); Amorette Wild 12/14 (86%); Carla Dziwoki 17/21 (81%)	Stats	Carla Borrego 44/48 (92%); Erin Bell 16/19 (84%); Cody Lange 2/3 (67%)

Round 13

Saturday 23 June	Waikato Bay of Plenty Magic	59 – 42	Adelaide Thunderbirds	TECT Arena
16:20 (UTC+12:00)	Julianna Naoupu 18/23 (78%); Irene van Dyk 41/42 (98%)	Report	Erin Bell; Carla Borrego

Round 14

Sunday 1 July	Adelaide Thunderbirds	65 – 44	Canterbury Tactix	Netball SA Stadium
13:40 (UTC+09:30)	Erin Bell ? Carla Borrego 34/37 (92%)	Report	Ellen Halpenny ? Joanne Harten ?

=== Final table ===
2012 ANZ Championship ladder
Pos	Team	Pld	W	L	GF	GA	GD	G%	Pts
1	Melbourne Vixens	13	10	3	645	569	76	113.36	20
2	Northern Mystics	13	10	3	667	633	34	105.37	20
3	Waikato Bay of Plenty Magic	13	9	4	699	594	105	117.68	18
4	Adelaide Thunderbirds	13	9	4	670	589	81	113.75	18
5	New South Wales Swifts	13	8	5	624	638	-14	97.81	16
6	Queensland Firebirds	13	7	6	686	640	46	107.19	14
7	Central Pulse	13	5	8	585	626	-41	93.45	10
8	West Coast Fever	13	3	10	608	673	-65	90.34	6
9	Southern Steel	13	2	11	639	728	-89	87.77	4
10	Canterbury Tactix	13	2	11	634	767	-133	82.66	4
Updated 28 March 2021

Qualified for Major semi-final
Qualified for Minor semi-final

- Pld = Games played
- W = Win (2 points)
- L = Loss (0 points)
- GF = Goals For
- GA = Goals Against
- GD = Goals Difference (= GF−GA)
- G% = Goal percentage (= 100 × GF/GA)

Pts = Points

== Finals ==
Semifinals
8 July – Rod Laver Arena
Melbourne Vixens	56
Northern Mystics	50
9 July – Claudelands Arena
Waikato Bay of Plenty Magic	49
Adelaide Thunderbirds	48

Preliminary final
16 July – Trusts Stadium
Northern Mystics	48
Waikato Bay of Plenty Magic	57

Grand final
22 July – Hisense Arena
Melbourne Vixens	38
Waikato Bay of Plenty Magic	41

=== Minor semi-final ===
Monday 9 July; 19:20 (UTC+12)	Stats	Waikato Bay of Plenty Magic	49–48	Adelaide Thunderbirds	Claudelands Arena
Monday 9 July; 19:20 (UTC+12)	Stats	Scoring by quarter: 15-7, 8-19, 15-13, 11-9			Claudelands Arena
Monday 9 July; 19:20 (UTC+12)	Stats	Irene van Dyk 28/28 (100%); Julianna Naoupu 21/23 (91%)		Erin Bell 26/29 (90%); Carla Borrego 22/30 (73%)	Claudelands Arena

== Award winners ==
=== Thunderbirds awards ===
Award	Winner
Thunderbirds MVP	Rebecca Bulley
The Advertiser Player of the Year	Rebecca Bulley
Tanya Denver Medal	Rebecca Bulley
Thunderbirds Players Player	Rebecca Bulley
Fan Favourite	Kate Shimmin
