= 2013 ANZ Championship season =

Netball league season

- League: ANZ Championship
- Sport: Netball
- Duration: 24 March – 14 July
- Teams: 10
- TV partner(s): Fox Sports (Australia); SBS; Sky Sport (New Zealand)
- Champions: Adelaide Thunderbirds
- Runners-up: Queensland Firebirds
- Minor premiers: Adelaide Thunderbirds
- Season MVP: Jhaniele Fowler (Southern Steel)
- Top scorer: Jhaniele Fowler (Southern Steel)

ANZ Championship seasons
- ← 2012 2014 →

The 2013 ANZ Championship season was the sixth season of the ANZ Championship. The 2013 season began on 24 March and concluded on 14 July. With a team captained by Natalie von Bertouch and featuring Erin Bell, Carla Borrego, Renae Hallinan, Rebecca Bulley and Sharni Layton, the Adelaide Thunderbirds won both the minor premiership and the overall championship. Having previously won the 2010 ANZ Championship, the Thunderbirds became the first team to win a second championship. The Thunderbirds secured the minor premiership with a 64–48 win over Northern Mystics in Round 13. They subsequently defeated Melbourne Vixens 49–39 in the major semi-final and Queensland Firebirds 50–48 in the grand final to win the championship.

== Transfers ==
Player	2012 team	2013 team
(Australia) Samantha Poolman	NNSW Waratahs	Adelaide Thunderbirds
(Australia) Johannah Curran	^{(Note 1)}	Melbourne Vixens
(Australia) Shannon Eagland	Queensland Firebirds	Melbourne Vixens
(Australia) Elissa Macleod	Queensland Firebirds	Melbourne Vixens
(Australia) Amy Steel	Queensland Firebirds	Melbourne Vixens
(Australia) Melissa Tallent	NNSW Waratahs	New South Wales Swifts
(Australia) Ashlee Weir	NNSW Waratahs	New South Wales Swifts
(Australia) Laura Clemesha	Australian Institute of Sport	Queensland Firebirds
(Australia) Demelza McCloud	Southern Steel	Queensland Firebirds
(Australia) Abbey McCulloch	NNSW Waratahs	Queensland Firebirds
(Australia) Kim Ravaillion	Australian Institute of Sport	Queensland Firebirds
(Australia) Gabi Simpson	Australian Institute of Sport	Queensland Firebirds
(Australia) Kate Beveridge	Melbourne Vixens	West Coast Fever
(Australia) Courtney Bruce	Australian Institute of Sport	West Coast Fever
(England) Jade Clarke	Northern Mystics	Canterbury Tactix
(New Zealand) Julianna Naoupu	Waikato Bay of Plenty Magic	Canterbury Tactix
(New Zealand) Louise Thayer	Southern Steel	Canterbury Tactix
(New Zealand) Liana Leota	^{(Note 2)}	Central Pulse
(New Zealand) Donna Wilkins	Southern Steel	Central Pulse
(Australia) Julie Corletto	Melbourne Vixens	Northern Mystics
(Jamaica) Jhaniele Fowler	Waulgrovians	Southern Steel
(New Zealand) Rachel Rasmussen	Northern Mystics	Southern Steel
(New Zealand) Sulu Tone-Fitzpatrick	Waikato Bay of Plenty Magic	Southern Steel
(New Zealand) Ellen Halpenny	Canterbury Tactix	Waikato Bay of Plenty Magic

Notes

- ^1 In 2011, Johannah Curran played for West Coast Fever.
- ^2 In 2011, Liana Leota played for Southern Steel.

== Salary cap ==
In October 2012, Netball New Zealand, the five New Zealand ANZ Championship franchises and the New Zealand Netball Players’ Association agreed a new collective agreement to take effect for the 2013 ANZ Championship season. This saw introduction of a $380,000 salary cap. Teams were permitted to contract between 12 and 14 players in their squad.

== Head coaches and captains ==
Team	Head coach	Captain
Adelaide Thunderbirds	Jane Woodlands-Thompson	Natalie von Bertouch
Melbourne Vixens	Simone McKinnis	Bianca Chatfield
New South Wales Swifts	Lisa Beehag	Mo'onia Gerrard; Kimberlee Green
Queensland Firebirds	Roselee Jencke	Laura Geitz
West Coast Fever	Norma Plummer	Catherine Cox
Canterbury Tactix	Leigh Gibbs	Anna Thompson
Central Pulse	Robyn Broughton	Katrina Grant
Northern Mystics	Ruth Aitken	Maria Tutaia
Southern Steel	Janine Southby	Jodi Brown
Waikato Bay of Plenty Magic	Noeline Taurua	Laura Langman

== Melbourne Vixens Summer Challenge ==
The main pre-season event was the Summer Challenge, hosted by Melbourne Vixens at the State Netball Hockey Centre on 23 and 24 February.

Round 1

Saturday 23 February	Melbourne Vixens	39–25	Canterbury Tactix	State Netball Hockey Centre

Saturday 23 February	New South Wales Swifts	28–35	Adelaide Thunderbirds	State Netball Hockey Centre

Round 2

Saturday 23 February	West Coast Fever	45–24	Northern Mystics	State Netball Hockey Centre

Saturday 23 February	Queensland Firebirds	30–28	Southern Steel	State Netball Hockey Centre

Round 3

Saturday 23 February	Melbourne Vixens	35–27	Adelaide Thunderbirds	State Netball Hockey Centre

Saturday 23 February	New South Wales Swifts	45–34	Canterbury Tactix	State Netball Hockey Centre

Round 4

Sunday 24 February	Southern Steel	36–35	New South Wales Swifts	State Netball Hockey Centre

Sunday 24 February	Canterbury Tactix	40–25	Northern Mystics	State Netball Hockey Centre

Round 5

Sunday 24 February	Melbourne Vixens	41–33	West Coast Fever	State Netball Hockey Centre

Round 6

Sunday 24 February	Queensland Firebirds	30–29	New South Wales Swifts	State Netball Hockey Centre

Sunday 24 February	Adelaide Thunderbirds	41–37	Canterbury Tactix	State Netball Hockey Centre

Round 7

Sunday 24 February	Melbourne Vixens	41–28	Northern Mystics	State Netball Hockey Centre

Sunday 24 February	West Coast Fever	41–40	Southern Steel	State Netball Hockey Centre

Round 8

Sunday 24 February	Queensland Firebirds	38–30	Adelaide Thunderbirds	State Netball Hockey Centre

== Regular season ==
=== Round 1 ===
Sunday 24 March	Queensland Firebirds	68 – 59	Southern Steel	Brisbane Convention and Exhibition Centre
11:10 am	Romelda Aiken 47/55 (85%); Natalie Medhurst 20/24 (83%); Ameliaranne Wells 1/1 (100%)	Report; Stats	Jodi Brown 15/21 (71%); Jhaniele Fowler 44/48 (92%)

Sunday 24 March	Adelaide Thunderbirds	49 – 42	Central Pulse	Netball SA Stadium
1:40 pm	Erin Bell 21/26 (81%); Carla Borrego 28/30 (93%)	Stats	Caitlin Thwaites 23/28 (82%); Donna Wilkins 19/19 (100%)

Sunday 24 March	Canterbury Tactix	46 – 69	Waikato Bay of Plenty Magic	Trafalgar Centre
7:20 pm	Sophia Fenwick 8/15 (53%); Joanne Harten 35/43 (81%); Anna Thompson 3/7 (43%)	Stats	Ellen Halpenny 13/17 (76%); Irene van Dyk 45/48 (94%); Jessica Waitapu 11/15 (73%)

Monday 25 March	Northern Mystics	46 – 60	Melbourne Vixens	Trusts Stadium
7:40 pm	Cathrine Latu 28/28 (100%); Maria Tutaia 18/27 (67%)	Stats	Tegan Caldwell 12/13 (92%); Karyn Howarth 38/45 (84%); Sharelle McMahon 10/14 (71%)

Monday 25 March	New South Wales Swifts	55 – 41	West Coast Fever	Sydney Olympic Park Sports Centre
7:40 pm	Carla Dziwoki 18/21 (86%); Susan Pratley 32/38 (84%); Amorette Wild 5/6 (83%)	Stats	Caitlin Bassett 3/5 (60%); Kate Beveridge 7/13 (54%); Catherine Cox 29/36 (81%); Lisa Millman 2/2 (100%)

=== Round 2 ===
Saturday 30 March	Canterbury Tactix	56 – 75	Southern Steel	CBS Canterbury Arena
4:20 pm	Sophia Fenwick 26/33 (79%); Joanne Harten 29/37 (78%); Julianna Naoupu 1/1 (100%)	Stats	Jodi Brown 10/11 (91%); Jhaniele Fowler 65/70 (93%)

Sunday 31 March	Melbourne Vixens	58 – 44	Adelaide Thunderbirds	Hisense Arena
12:10 pm	Tegan Caldwell 22/24 (92%); Karyn Howarth 36/41 (88%)	Stats	Erin Bell 25/29 (86%); Carla Borrego 17/20 (85%); Stephanie Puopolo 2/2 (100%)

Sunday 31 March	West Coast Fever	80 – 53	Northern Mystics	Challenge Stadium
11:10 am	Caitlin Bassett 62/70 (89%); Catherine Cox 18/19 (95%)	Stats	Cathrine Latu 14/16 (88%); Bailey Mes 5/6 (83%); Maria Tutaia 34/42 (81%)

Sunday 31 March	Waikato Bay of Plenty Magic	61 – 35	New South Wales Swifts	ASB Baypark Arena
7:20 pm	Ellen Halpenny 12/18 (67%); Irene van Dyk 32/33 (97%); Jessica Waitapu 17/20 (85%)	Stats	Carla Dziwoki 10/14 (71%); Susan Pratley 23/29 (79%); Amorette Wild 2/4 (50%)

Monday 1 April	Central Pulse	56 – 58	Queensland Firebirds	Te Rauparaha Arena
7:40 pm	Caitlin Thwaites 35/40 (88%); Donna Wilkins 21/26 (81%)	Stats	Romelda Aiken 40/46 (87%); Natalie Medhurst 18/23 (78%)

=== Round 3 ===
Saturday 6 April	Southern Steel	54 – 60	Adelaide Thunderbirds	Lion Foundation Arena
4:20 pm	Jhaniele Fowler 41/45 (91%); Jodi Brown 13/14 (93%)	Stats	Carla Borrego 36/42 (86%); Erin Bell 24/29 (83%)

Sunday 7 April	West Coast Fever	57 – 51	Waikato Bay of Plenty Magic	Challenge Stadium
10:10 am	Caitlin Bassett 36/39 (92%); Catherine Cox 19/28 (68%); Kate Beveridge 2/5 (40%)	Stats	Ellen Halpenny 32/42 (76%); Irene van Dyk 15/19 (79%); Jess Waitapu 4/8 (50%)

Sunday 7 April	Northern Mystics	51 – 72	Queensland Firebirds	Trusts Stadium
7:20 pm	Maria Tutaia 28/34 (82%); Cathrine Latu 23/23 (100%)	Stats	Romelda Aiken 56/66 (85%); Natalie Medhurst 12/12 (100%); Ameliaranne Wells 4/7 (57%)

Monday 8 April	Central Pulse	55 – 49	New South Wales Swifts	TSB Bank Arena
7:40 pm	Caitlin Thwaites 30/32 (94%); Donna Wilkins 25/27 (93%)	Stats	Susan Pratley 26/30 (87%); Carla Dziwoki 21/24 (88%); Amorette Wild 2/2 (100%)

Monday 8 April	Melbourne Vixens	60 – 40	Canterbury Tactix	Hisense Arena
7:40 pm	Karyn Howarth 39/46 (85%); Tegan Caldwell 20/23 (87%); Erin Hoare 1/1 (100%)	Stats	Joanne Harten 19/27 (70%); Sophia Fenwick 12/19 (63%); Julianna Naoupu 9/12 (75%)

=== Round 4 ===
Sunday 14 April	Adelaide Thunderbirds	72 – 46	West Coast Fever	Netball SA Stadium
11:40 am	Erin Bell 25/29 (86%); Carla Borrego 43/46 (93%); Laura Packard 4/7 (57%)	Stats	Caitlin Bassett 35/41 (85%); Catherine Cox 11/16 (69%)

Sunday 14 April	Central Pulse	59 – 56	Southern Steel	Arena Manawatu
7:20 pm	Caitlin Thwaites 33/37 (89%); Donna Wilkins 26/28 (93%)	Stats	Jodi Brown 9/10 (90%); Jhaniele Fowler 47/52 (90%)

Monday 15 April	Canterbury Tactix	80 – 78	Northern Mystics	CBS Canterbury Arena
7:40 pm	Joanne Harten 63/67 (94%); Sophia Fenwick 11/20 (55%); Julianna Naoupu 6/9 (67%)	Q4: 63 – 63; Stats	Cathrine Latu 57/59 (97%); Maria Tutaia 21/27 (78%)

Monday 15 April	New South Wales Swifts	53 – 61	Queensland Firebirds	Sydney Olympic Park Sports Centre
7:40 pm	Susan Pratley 34/43 (79%); Amorette Wild 19/23 (83%)	Stats	Romelda Aiken 38/39 (97%); Natalie Medhurst 23/27 (85%)

BYES: Melbourne Vixens and Waikato Bay of Plenty Magic

=== Round 5 ===
Sunday 21 April	Adelaide Thunderbirds	39 – 38	Melbourne Vixens	Netball SA Stadium
11:40 am	Carla Borrego 22/27 (81%); Erin Bell 17/24 (71%)	Stats	Tegan Caldwell 21/23 (91%); Erin Hoare 11/14 (79%); Sharelle McMahon 6/11 (55%)

Sunday 21 April	West Coast Fever	71 – 51	New South Wales Swifts	Challenge Stadium
12:10 pm	Caitlin Bassett 47/55 (85%); Catherine Cox 23/26 (88%); Kate Beveridge 1/1 (100%)	Stats	Carla Dziwoki 19/22 (86%); Susan Pratley 14/17 (82%); Amorette Wild 9/11 (82%); Melissa Tallent 9/12 (75%)

Sunday 21 April	Northern Mystics	69 – 68	Central Pulse	Trusts Stadium
7:20 pm	Cathrine Latu 45/45 (100%); Maria Tutaia 24/32 (75%)	Q4: 56 – 56; Stats	Caitlin Thwaites 41/45 (91%); Donna Wilkins 27/30 (90%)

Monday 22 April	Waikato Bay of Plenty Magic	65 – 45	Canterbury Tactix	ASB Baypark Arena
7:40 pm	Irene van Dyk 38/38 (100%); Ellen Halpenny 21/25 (84%); Jess Waitapu 6/7 (86%)	Stats	Joanne Harten 20/22 (91%); Sophia Fenwick 14/16 (88%); Julianna Naoupu 11/13 (85%)

BYES: Queensland Firebirds and Southern Steel

=== Round 6 ===
Saturday 27 April	West Coast Fever	49 – 58	Melbourne Vixens	Perth Arena
12:10 pm	Caitlin Bassett 39/43 (91%); Catherine Cox 10/16 (63%)	Stats	Tegan Caldwell 35/41 (85%); Sharelle McMahon 23/30 (77%)

Sunday 28 April	Queensland Firebirds	53 – 54	Adelaide Thunderbirds	Brisbane Convention and Exhibition Centre
12:10 pm	Romelda Aiken 46/49 (94%); Natalie Medhurst 7/10 (70%)	Stats	Carla Borrego 29/32 (91%); Erin Bell 25/31 (81%)

Sunday 28 April	Central Pulse	53 – 52	Waikato Bay of Plenty Magic	TSB Bank Arena
7:20 pm	Caitlin Thwaites 32/37 (86%); Donna Wilkins 21/23 (91%)	Stats	Irene van Dyk 29/29 (100%); Ellen Halpenny 23/29 (79%)

Monday 29 April	Southern Steel	67 – 52	Northern Mystics	Stadium Southland Velodrome
7:40 pm	Jhaniele Fowler 53/54 (98%); Jodi Brown 12/15 (80%); Te Paea Selby-Rickit 2/3 (67%)	Stats	Cathrine Latu 22/25 (88%); Maria Tutaia 22/31 (71%); Bailey Mes 8/9 (89%)

BYES: New South Wales Swifts and Canterbury Tactix

=== Round 7 ===
Sunday 5 May	Queensland Firebirds	63 – 54	West Coast Fever	Brisbane Convention and Exhibition Centre
12:10 pm	Romelda Aiken 40/44 (91%); Natalie Medhurst 22/30 (73%); Ameliaranne Wells 1/1 (100%)	Stats	Caitlin Bassett 34/39 (87%); Catherine Cox 20/24 (83%)

Sunday 5 May	Melbourne Vixens	52 – 30	Central Pulse	Hisense Arena
2:10 pm	Sharelle McMahon 20/23 (87%); Tegan Caldwell 24/34 (71%); Karyn Howarth 8/11 (73%)	Stats	Caitlin Thwaites 15/21 (71%); Donna Wilkins 11/13 (85%); Paula Griffin 4/6 (67%)

Sunday 5 May	Northern Mystics	57 – 61	Canterbury Tactix	Trusts Stadium
7:20 pm	Cathrine Latu 26/27 (96%); Maria Tutaia 20/23 (87%); Bailey Mes 11/13 (85%)	Stats	Joanne Harten 37/40 (93%); Sophia Fenwick 24/33 (73%)

Monday 6 May	Southern Steel	60 – 55	New South Wales Swifts	Stadium Southland Velodrome
7:40 pm	Jhaniele Fowler 59/63 (94%); Jodi Brown 1/3 (33%)	Stats	Susan Pratley 33/34 (97%); Carla Dziwoki 22/27 (81%)

Monday 6 May	Adelaide Thunderbirds	45 – 33	Waikato Bay of Plenty Magic	Netball SA Stadium
7:10 pm	Carla Borrego 29/35 (83%); Erin Bell 16/23 (70%)	Stats	Irene van Dyk 13/16 (81%); Ellen Halpenny 12/18 (67%); Jess Waitapu 8/14 (57%)

=== Round 8 ===
Saturday 11 May	Canterbury Tactix	51 – 76	Queensland Firebirds	CBS Canterbury Arena
4:20 pm	Joanne Harten 33/36 (92%); Julianna Naoupu 13/16 (81%); Sophia Fenwick 5/9 (56%)	Stats	Romelda Aiken 46/51 (90%); Natalie Medhurst 20/21 (95%); Ameliaranne Wells 10/11 (91%)

Sunday 12 May	New South Wales Swifts	42 – 50	Melbourne Vixens	Sydney Olympic Park Sports Centre
12:10 pm	Carla Dziwoki 19/21 (90%); Susan Pratley 18/25 (72%); Melissa Tallent 5/6 (83%)	Stats	Tegan Caldwell 22/25 (88%); Karyn Howarth 19/23 (83%); Sharelle McMahon 9/14 (64%)

Sunday 12 May	West Coast Fever	47 – 49	Adelaide Thunderbirds	Challenge Stadium
12:10 pm	Caitlin Bassett 35/39 (90%); Catherine Cox 12/16 (75%)	Stats	Carla Borrego 29/29 (100%); Erin Bell 20/28 (71%)

Sunday 12 May	Northern Mystics	63 – 73	Southern Steel	Trusts Stadium
7:20 pm	Bailey Mes 37/45 (82%); Maria Tutaia 26/35 (74%)	Stats	Jhaniele Fowler 59/61 (97%); Jodi Brown 14/14 (100%)

Monday 13 May	Waikato Bay of Plenty Magic	53 – 49	Central Pulse	Claudelands Arena
7:40 pm	Ellen Halpenny 32/40 (80%); Irene van Dyk 21/22 (95%)	Stats	Caitlin Thwaites 33/35 (94%); Donna Wilkins 16/17 (94%)

=== Round 9 ===
Saturday 18 May	Southern Steel	65 – 58	Waikato Bay of Plenty Magic	Stadium Southland Velodrome
4:20 pm	Jhaniele Fowler 44/46 (96%); Jodi Brown 21/24 (88%)	Stats	Irene van Dyk 29/29 (100%); Jess Waitapu 7/7 (100%); Ellen Halpenny 22/31 (71%)

Sunday 19 May	Melbourne Vixens	46 – 57	Queensland Firebirds	Hisense Arena
12:10 pm	Karyn Howarth 27/31 (87%); Tegan Caldwell 15/19 (79%); Sharelle McMahon 4/8 (50%)	Stats	Romelda Aiken 36/41 (88%); Natalie Medhurst 21/26 (81%)

Sunday 19 May	Adelaide Thunderbirds	50 – 48	New South Wales Swifts	Netball SA Stadium
1:40 pm	Carla Borrego 30/33 (91%); Erin Bell 20/27 (74%)	Stats	Melissa Tallent 10/11 (91%); Susan Pratley 29/35 (83%); Carla Dziwoki 9/12 (75%)

Sunday 19 May	Canterbury Tactix	55 – 64	West Coast Fever	Trafalgar Centre
7:20 pm	Joanne Harten 31/38 (82%); Julianna Naoupu 13/18 (72%); Sophia Fenwick 11/17 (65%)	Stats	Caitlin Bassett 49/54 (91%); Kate Beveridge 1/1 (100%); Catherine Cox 14/18 (78%)

Monday 20 May	Central Pulse	63 – 48	Northern Mystics	Te Rauparaha Arena
7:40 pm	Caitlin Thwaites 43/47 (91%); Donna Wilkins 20/22 (91%)	Stats	Cathrine Latu 15/17 (88%); Maria Tutaia 22/27 (81%); Bailey Mes 11/13 (85%)

=== Round 10 ===
Sunday 26 May	New South Wales Swifts	63 – 44	Northern Mystics	Sydney Olympic Park Sports Centre
12:10 pm	Susan Pratley 40/45 (89%); Carla Dziwoki 21/26 (81%); Melissa Tallent 2/3 (67%)	Report; Stats	Bailey Mes 13/16 (81%); Maria Tutaia 19/23 (83%); Cathrine Latu 12/14 (86%)

Sunday 26 May	Queensland Firebirds	62 – 65	Waikato Bay of Plenty Magic	Gold Coast Convention and Exhibition Centre
2:10 pm	Romelda Aiken 42/46 (91%); Natalie Medhurst 20/25 (80%)	Report; Stats	Ellen Halpenny 34/44 (77%); Irene van Dyk 31/32 (97%)

Sunday 26 May	Central Pulse	53 – 52	West Coast Fever	TSB Bank Arena
7:20 pm	Caitlin Thwaites 28/33 (85%); Donna Wilkins 25/25 (100%)	Report; Stats	Caitlin Bassett 31/32 (97%); Catherine Cox 18/20 (90%); Kate Beveridge 3/3 (100%)

Monday 27 May	Canterbury Tactix	58 – 62	Adelaide Thunderbirds	Lion Foundation Arena
7:40 pm	Sophia Fenwick 33/44 (75%); Joanne Harten 25/30 (83%)	Report; Stats	Carla Borrego 45/50 (90%); Erin Bell 11/16 (69%); Laura Packard 6/13 (46%); Stephanie Puopolo 0/2 (0%)

Monday 27 May	Melbourne Vixens	58 – 52	Southern Steel	Hisense Arena
7:40 pm	Tegan Caldwell 33/37 (89%); Karyn Howarth 25/29 (86%)	Report; Stats	Jhaniele Fowler 45/50 (90%); Jodi Brown 7/9 (78%)

=== Round 11 ===
Sunday 2 June	New South Wales Swifts	43 – 46	Adelaide Thunderbirds	Allphones Arena
12:10 pm	Susan Pratley 26/29 (90%); Carla Dziwoki 14/16 (88%); Melissa Tallent 3/5 (60%)	Report; Stats	Carla Borrego 31/33 (94%); Erin Bell 15/16 (94%)

Sunday 2 June	Queensland Firebirds	47 – 53	Melbourne Vixens	Brisbane Convention and Exhibition Centre
2:10 pm	Romelda Aiken 34/40 (85%); Natalie Medhurst 13/17 (76%)	Report; Stats	Karyn Howarth 30/39 (77%); Sharelle McMahon 6/7 (86%)

Sunday 2 June	Waikato Bay of Plenty Magic	58 – 52	Southern Steel	Energy Events Centre
7:20 pm	Irene van Dyk 35/36 (97%); Ellen Halpenny 23/26 (88%)	Report; Stats	Jhaniele Fowler 39/40 (98%); Jodi Brown 13/18 (72%)

Monday 3 June	Canterbury Tactix	45 – 62	Central Pulse	CBS Canterbury Arena
7:40 pm	Joanne Harten 28/34 (82%); Sophia Fenwick 12/21 (57%); Julianna Naoupu 5/9 (56%)	Report; Stats	Caitlin Thwaites 38/46 (83%); Donna Wilkins 24/28 (86%)

BYES: West Coast Fever and Northern Mystics

=== Round 12 ===
Saturday 8 June	Melbourne Vixens	39 – 48	New South Wales Swifts	Hisense Arena
2:10 pm	Karyn Howarth 7/8 (88%); Sharelle McMahon 10/15 (67%); Tegan Caldwell 22/26 (85%)	Stats	Carla Dziwoki 25/32 (78%); Susan Pratley 23/37 (62%)

Sunday 9 June	West Coast Fever	47 – 72	Queensland Firebirds	Challenge Stadium
10:10 am	Caitlin Bassett 34/39 (87%); Kate Beveridge 3/4 (75%)	Report; Stats	Romelda Aiken 45/57 (79%); Natalie Medhurst 27/33 (82%)

Sunday 9 June	Southern Steel	79 – 62	Canterbury Tactix	Lion Foundation Arena
7:20 pm	Jhaniele Fowler 65/69 (94%); Jodi Brown 12/14 (86%); Te Paea Selby-Rickit 2/4 (50%)	Report; Stats	Joanne Harten 38/43 (88%); Sophia Fenwick 10/16 (63%)

Monday 10 June	Northern Mystics	50 – 60	Waikato Bay of Plenty Magic	Trusts Stadium
7:40 pm	Bailey Mes 29/36 (81%); Maria Tutaia 21/30 (70%)	Report; Stats	Ellen Halpenny 27/30 (90%); Irene van Dyk 33/34 (97%)

BYES: Adelaide Thunderbirds and Central Pulse

=== Round 13 ===
Sunday 16 June	Queensland Firebirds	52 – 48	New South Wales Swifts	Brisbane Convention and Exhibition Centre
12:10 pm	Romelda Aiken 37/40 (93%); Natalie Medhurst 15/17 (88%)	Stats	Susan Pratley 30/37 (81%); Carla Dziwoki 18/20 (90%)

Sunday 16 June	Adelaide Thunderbirds	64 – 48	Northern Mystics	Netball SA Stadium
1:40 pm	Carla Borrego 45/50 (90%); Erin Bell 19/23 (83%)	Report; Stats	Bailey Mes 38/43 (88%); Maria Tutaia 10/16 (63%)

Sunday 16 June	Waikato Bay of Plenty Magic	56 – 51	Melbourne Vixens	Claudelands Arena
7:20 pm	Irene van Dyk 31/33 (94%); Ellen Halpenny 25/29 (86%)	Stats	Tegan Caldwell 28/29 (97%); Karyn Howarth 23/27 (85%)

Monday 17 June	Central Pulse	73 – 59	Canterbury Tactix	Te Rauparaha Arena
7:40 pm	Paula Griffin 50/58 (86%); Donna Wilkins 23/26 (88%)	Report; Stats	Joanne Harten 28/34 (82%); Julianna Naoupu 19/22 (86%); Sophia Fenwick 12/16 (75%)

Monday 17 June	West Coast Fever	68 – 56	Southern Steel	Challenge Stadium
5:40 pm	Caitlin Bassett 41/44 (93%); Catherine Cox 27/32 (84%)	Report; Stats	Jhaniele Fowler 45/49 (92%); Jodi Brown 7/13 (54%); Te Paea Selby-Rickit 4/5 (80%)

=== Round 14 ===
Sunday 23 June	Melbourne Vixens	69 – 39	West Coast Fever	Hisense Arena
12:10 pm	Karyn Howarth 41/47 (87%); Tegan Caldwell 16/18 (89%); Sharelle McMahon 12/19 (63%)	Report; Stats	Catherine Cox 17/22 (77%); Kate Beveridge 13/17 (76%); Caitlin Bassett 7/12 (58%); Lisa Millman 2/2 (100%)

Sunday 23 June	Adelaide Thunderbirds	54 – 52	Queensland Firebirds	Netball SA Stadium
1:40 pm	Carla Borrego 33/35 (94%); Erin Bell 21/28 (75%)	Stats	Romelda Aiken 44/49 (90%); Natalie Medhurst 8/10 (80%)

Sunday 23 June	Southern Steel	64 – 73	Central Pulse	Stadium Southland Velodrome
7:20 pm	Jhaniele Fowler 60/61 (98%); Jodi Brown 4/5 (80%)	Report; Stats	Caitlin Thwaites 45/51 (88%); Donna Wilkins 28/31 (90%)

Monday 24 June	Waikato Bay of Plenty Magic	68 – 40	Northern Mystics	ASB Baypark Arena
7:40 pm		Report; Stats

Monday 24 June	New South Wales Swifts	62 – 42	Canterbury Tactix	Sydney Olympic Park Sports Centre
7:40 pm	Susan Pettitt 39/42 (93%); Carla Dziwoki 12/14 (86%); Amorette Wild 3/7 (43%); Melissa Tallent 8/12 (67%)	Stats	Joanne Harten 25/34 (74%); Julianna Naoupu 12/17 (71%); Sophia Fenwick 5/9 (56%)

=== Final table ===
2013 ANZ Championship ladder
Pos	Team	Pld	W	L	GF	GA	GD	G%	Pts
1	Adelaide Thunderbirds	13	12	1	688	620	+68	111.0	24
2	Melbourne Vixens	13	9	4	692	589	+103	117.5	18
3	Waikato Bay of Plenty Magic	13	9	4	749	650	+99	115.2	18
4	Queensland Firebirds	13	9	4	793	691	+102	114.8	18
5	Central Pulse	13	8	5	736	706	+30	104.2	16
6	Southern Steel	13	6	7	812	790	+22	102.8	12
7	West Coast Fever	13	5	8	715	757	−42	94.5	10
8	New South Wales Swifts	13	4	9	652	672	−20	97.0	8
9	Canterbury Tactix	13	2	11	700	882	−182	79.4	4
10	Northern Mystics	13	1	12	699	879	−180	79.5	2
Updated 7 April 2021

Qualified for Major semi-final
Qualified for Minor semi-final

- Pld = Games played
- W = Win (2 points)
- L = Loss (0 points)
- GF = Goals For
- GA = Goals Against
- GD = Goals Difference (= GF−GA)
- G% = Goal percentage (= 100 × GF/GA)

Pts = Points

== Finals ==
Semifinals
30 June – Netball SA Stadium
Adelaide Thunderbirds	49
Melbourne Vixens	39
1 July – Claudelands Arena
Waikato Bay of Plenty Magic	50
Queensland Firebirds	53

Preliminary final
7 July – Parkville Stadium
Melbourne Vixens	46
Queensland Firebirds	50

Grand final
14 July – Adelaide Entertainment Centre
Adelaide Thunderbirds	50
Queensland Firebirds	48

=== Major semi-final ===
Sunday 30 June; 11:45 am	Stats	Adelaide Thunderbirds	49–39	Melbourne Vixens	Netball SA Stadium
Sunday 30 June; 11:45 am	Stats	Scoring by quarter: 12–8, 20-21, 31–30, 49–39			Netball SA Stadium
Sunday 30 June; 11:45 am	Stats	Carla Borrego 32/37 (86%); Erin Bell 17/22 (77%); Laura Packard 0/1 (0%)		Karyn Howarth 29/35 (83%); Sharelle McMahon 8/10 (80%); Tegan Caldwell 2/2 (100%)	Netball SA Stadium

=== Minor semi-final ===
Sunday 30 June; 7:20 pm	Stats	Waikato Bay of Plenty Magic	50–53	Queensland Firebirds	Claudelands Arena	Sky Sport
Sunday 30 June; 7:20 pm	Stats	Scoring by quarter: 8–13, 24–25, 36–41, 50–53			Claudelands Arena	Sky Sport
Sunday 30 June; 7:20 pm	Stats	Irene van Dyk 27/28 (96%); Ellen Halpenny 23/26 (88%)		Romelda Aiken 40/46 (87%); Natalie Medhurst 13/17 (76%)	Claudelands Arena	Sky Sport

=== Preliminary final ===
Sunday 7 July; 12:15 pm	Stats	Melbourne Vixens	46–50	Queensland Firebirds	State Netball Hockey Centre
Sunday 7 July; 12:15 pm	Stats	Scoring by quarter: 13–10, 24–25, 31–39, 46–50			State Netball Hockey Centre
Sunday 7 July; 12:15 pm	Stats	Karyn Howarth 23/28 (82%); Sharelle McMahon 13/17 (76%); Tegan Caldwell 10/11 (91%)		Romelda Aiken 37/42 (88%); Natalie Medhurst 13/16 (81%)	State Netball Hockey Centre

=== Grand final ===
Sunday 14 July; 2:00 pm	Stats	Adelaide Thunderbirds	50–48	Queensland Firebirds	Adelaide Entertainment Centre
Sunday 14 July; 2:00 pm	Stats	Scoring by quarter: 9–13, 24–26, 40–37, 50–48			Adelaide Entertainment Centre
Sunday 14 July; 2:00 pm	Stats	Carla Borrego 26/33 (79%); Erin Bell 24/31 (77%)		Romelda Aiken 39/47 (83%); Natalie Medhurst 9/11 (82%)	Adelaide Entertainment Centre

== Season statistics ==
Top 5 Goals scored
Pos.	Player	Team	GS	GA	G%
1	Jhaniele Fowler	Southern Steel	606	648	93.5
2	Romelda Aiken	Queensland Firebirds	507	574	88.3
3	Caitlin Bassett	West Coast Fever	443	498	89.0
4	Joanne Harten	Canterbury Tactix	386	451	85.6
5	Carla Borrego	Adelaide Thunderbirds	385	438	87.9

Top 5 Goal assists
Pos.	Player	Team	G/A
1	Madison Browne	Melbourne Vixens	208
2	Jodi Brown	Southern Steel	206
3	Laura Langman	Waikato Bay of Plenty Magic	188
4	Verity Simmons	West Coast Fever	171
5	Liana Leota	Central Pulse	161

Top 5 Rebounds
Pos.	Player	Team	Reb.
1	Romelda Aiken	Queensland Firebirds	54
2	Joanne Harten	Canterbury Tactix	32
3	Geva Mentor	Melbourne Vixens	31
4	Carla Borrego	Adelaide Thunderbirds	30
5	Jhaniele Fowler	Southern Steel	29

Top 5 Centre-pass receives
Pos.	Player	Team	CPR
1	Maria Tutaia	Northern Mystics	296
2	Madison Browne	Melbourne Vixens	284
3	Donna Wilkins	Central Pulse	283
4	Liana Leota	Central Pulse	264
5	Anna Thompson	Canterbury Tactix	263

Top 5 Intercepts
Pos.	Player	Team	Int.
1	Geva Mentor	Melbourne Vixens	29
2	Katrina Grant	Central Pulse	28
3	Laura Geitz	Queensland Firebirds	26
4	Sharni Layton	Adelaide Thunderbirds	24
5	Sonia Mkoloma	New South Wales Swifts	23

Top 5 Deflections
Pos.	Player	Team	Defl.
1	Geva Mentor	Melbourne Vixens	77
2	Katrina Grant	Central Pulse	59
3	Eboni Beckford-Chambers	West Coast Fever	56
4	Leana de Bruin	Waikato Bay of Plenty Magic	54
5	Jane Watson	Canterbury Tactix	48

Top 5 Penalties
Pos.	Player	Team	Pen.
1	Sonia Mkoloma	New South Wales Swifts	220
2	Geva Mentor	Melbourne Vixens	190
3	Rachel Rasmussen	Southern Steel	187
4	Casey Kopua	Waikato Bay of Plenty Magic	182
5	Sharni Layton	Adelaide Thunderbirds	178

Top 5 Turnovers
Pos.	Player	Team	Turn.
1	Maria Tutaia	Northern Mystics	75
2	Joanne Harten	Canterbury Tactix	74
3	Sophia Fenwick	Canterbury Tactix	71
4	Susan Pratley	New South Wales Swifts	69
5	Carla Borrego	Adelaide Thunderbirds	67

== Award winners ==
=== ANZ Championship awards ===
Award	Winner	Team
ANZ Championship Most Valuable Player	(Jamaica) Jhaniele Fowler	Southern Steel
ANZ Championship Grand Final MVP	(Australia) Erin Bell	Adelaide Thunderbirds
ANZ Championship Best New Talent	(Jamaica) Jhaniele Fowler	Southern Steel

=== All Star Team ===
Position	Player	Team
GS	(Jamaica) Jhaniele Fowler	Southern Steel
GA	(Australia) Erin Bell	Adelaide Thunderbirds
WA	(Australia) Madison Browne	Melbourne Vixens
C	(New Zealand) Laura Langman	Waikato Bay of Plenty Magic
WD	(Australia) Renae Hallinan	Adelaide Thunderbirds
GD	(New Zealand) Casey Kopua	Waikato Bay of Plenty Magic
GK	(England) Geva Mentor	Melbourne Vixens
Coach	(Australia) Jane Woodlands-Thompson	Adelaide Thunderbirds

=== Australian Netball Awards ===
Award	Winner	Team
Australian ANZ Championship Player of the Year	(Australia) Erin Bell	Adelaide Thunderbirds
Liz Ellis Diamond	(Australia) Renae Hallinan	Adelaide Thunderbirds
Australian ANZ Championship Coach of the Year	(Australia) Jane Woodlands-Thompson	Adelaide Thunderbirds

== Media coverage ==
Netball Australia signed a new TV rights agreement with Fox Sports and SBS. All 69 games, including the playoffs were broadcast live by Fox Sports. SBS 2, replacing Network 10, broadcast a live Sunday match as well as providing coverage of the playoffs on its free-to-air television network. Sky Sport continued to broadcast live games in New Zealand.
