= Vanessa Ware =

Australian netball player

Personal information
- Born: 26 October 1985 (age 41)
- Height: 1.71 m (5 ft 7 in)
- School: De La Salle College, Cronulla

Netball career
- Playing positions: WA, C
Years	Club team	Apps
2003–2004	NSWIS	
2003–2007	Sydney Swifts	40
2008–2013	New South Wales Swifts	67
Years	National team	Caps
2011	Australia	
Medal record
Representing Australia
World Netball Series
Bronze medal – third place	2011 Liverpool	Team

Vanessa Ware (born 26 October 1985) is a former Australian netball player. Between 2003 and 2007 she played for Sydney Swifts in the Commonwealth Bank Trophy league. She was a member of the Sydney Swifts teams that won premierships in 2004, 2006, 2007. Between 2008 and 2013 she played for New South Wales Swifts in the ANZ Championship. She was a member of the Swifts team that won the 2008 ANZ Championship. She also represented Australia at under-19, under-21 and Fast5 levels.

== Early life, family and education ==
Ware is originally from Sutherland Shire. Ware and her future team mate, Kimberlee Green have been best friends since meeting at Little Athletics when they were seven. Ware attended De La Salle College, Cronulla.

== Playing career ==
=== Early years ===
Ware played netball for both De La Salle College, Cronulla and the New South Wales Institute of Sport.

=== Sydney Swifts ===
Between 2003 and 2007, Ware made 40 appearances for Sydney Swifts in the Commonwealth Bank Trophy league. She was 16 when she began playing for the Sydney Swifts first team. She made her senior debut for Swifts on 26 July 2003 in a Round 10 match against Perth Orioles. She came on at wing attack in a game Swifts won 67–41. She was subsequently a member of the Sydney Swifts teams that won premierships in 2004, 2006, 2007.

=== New South Wales Swifts ===
Between 2008 and 2013, Ware made 67 appearances for New South Wales Swifts in the ANZ Championship. She was a member of the Swifts team that won the 2008 ANZ Championship. During 2010, Ware suffered from back and knee injuries which ended her season early. However she recovered and returned in 2011. In 2012, Ware and Kimberlee Green celebrated ten consecutive seasons with Sydney Swifts/New South Wales Swifts. Ware subsequently played her 50th ANZ Championship match in a 2012 Round 9 match against Melbourne Vixens. 2013 was Ware's eleventh and final season with Sydney Swifts/New South Wales Swifts. She played her 100th game for Swifts against Southern Steel in Round 7. After 107 games, Ware retired from elite netball after the Round 14 game against Canterbury Tactix.

=== Australia ===
In 2004 Ware represented Australia at under-19 level. In 2006 she was included in the Australia under-21 squad. In 2008 she was included in the senior squad. Ware also represented Australia at the 2011 World Netball Series.

== Honours ==
New South Wales Swifts

- ANZ Championship
  - Winners: 2008

Sydney Swifts

- Commonwealth Bank Trophy
  - Winners: 2004, 2006, 2007
  - Runners up: 2003, 2005
