= New South Wales Blues =

New South Wales Blues may refer to:

- Netball New South Wales Blues
- New South Wales cricket team
- New South Wales rugby league team
