= Charlotte Kight =

New Zealand netball player

Personal information
- Born: 8 June 1988 (age 38) Dannevirke, New Zealand
- Height: 1.83 m (6 ft 0 in)

Netball career
- Playing positions: WD, GD, GK
| Years | Club team | Apps |
| 2005–2006 | Western Flyers | |
| 2007–2011 | Canterbury Tactix | |
| 2012–present | Northern Mystics | |
| Years | National team | Caps |
| 2006–2009 | New Zealand U21 | |
| 2009 | Silver Ferns | |
| 2010 | FastNet Ferns | |
Medal record
Representing New Zealand
World Netball Series
| Gold medal – first place | 2009 Manchester | Fastnet |
| Gold medal – first place | 2010 Liverpool | Fastnet |
- Updated on 11 December 2012

Charlotte Kight (born 8 June 1988 in Dannevirke, New Zealand) is a retired New Zealand netball player. Kight started in the National Bank Cup with the Western Flyers in 2005, under head coach Yvette McCausland-Durie. She played with the Flyers for two years, before moving to the Canterbury Flames for the final year of the competition in 2007. With the start of the ANZ Championship in 2008, she continued to play with the Canterbury franchise, which changed their name to the Canterbury Tactix.

At international level, Kight played with the New Zealand U21 team from 2006 to 2009. She was also selected for the senior national team, the Silver Ferns in 2009, although she was not capped. Charlotte is the sister of Blackstick Bridget Kight.

In 2012, she left the Tactix and signed with the Northern Mystics, in order to get more court time in the wing defence position. She has resigned for the 2013 season.

She headlined the 2012 Fight for Christchurch, fighting fellow netballer and ex-teammate Elizabeth Manu, a fight which she won.
