= Samantha Poolman =

Australian netball player

Personal information
- Born: 4 March 1991 (age 35) John Hunter Hospital; Newcastle, New South Wales
- Height: 189 cm (6 ft 2 1/2 in)
- School: Lambton High School

Netball career
- Playing positions: GK, GD
Years	Club team	Apps
2009	Territory Storm	
2010–2011	NNSW Blues	
2011	→ AIS	
2012	NNSW Waratahs	
2013–2016	Adelaide Thunderbirds	
2013–2015	→ Southern Force	
2013–2015	→ Garville	
2017–2021	Giants Netball	
Years	National team	Caps
Medal record
Representing Australia
Fast5 World Series
Bronze medal – third place	2017 Melbourne	Team
Bronze medal – third place	2018 Melbourne	Team

Samantha Poolman (born 4 March 1991), also known as Sam Poolman, is a former Australian netball player. Between 2010 and 2015, Poolman played for NNSW Blues, NNSW Waratahs and Southern Force in the Australian Netball League. Between 2013 and 2016, she played for Adelaide Thunderbirds in the ANZ Championship. She was a member of the Thunderbirds team that won the 2013 ANZ Championship. Between 2017 and 2021, Poolman has played for Giants in Suncorp Super Netball.

== Early life, family and education ==
Poolman is originally from Newcastle, New South Wales. She attended Lambton High School. In 2021 Poolman was named Newcastle's Young Citizen of the Year.

== Playing career ==
=== Early years ===
Poolman began playing netball aged seven, playing for the West Leagues Netball Club in Newcastle. As a 16-year-old, she was invited to training sessions with Hunter Jaegers. She was also selected for the Newcastle representative team and gained scholarships to the Hunter Academy of Sport, the New South Wales Institute of Sport and the Australian Institute of Sport.

=== New South Wales ===
Between 2007 and 2012, Poolman represented New South Wales in the Australian National Netball Championships at under-17, under-19 and under-21 levels, playing in five tournament winning teams.

=== Australian Netball League ===
Poolman played for Territory Storm, NNSW Blues and NNSW Waratahs in the Australian Netball League. She played for Storm in 2009, for Blues in 2010 and 2011 and for Waratahs in 2012. After signing for Adelaide Thunderbirds, Poolman subsequently played in the ANL for Southern Force diring the 2013, 2014 and 2015 seasons.

=== Adelaide Thunderbirds ===
Between 2013 and 2016, Poolman played for Adelaide Thunderbirds in the ANZ Championship. She was a member of the Thunderbirds team that won the 2013 ANZ Championship, playing in Rounds 2, 3, 8 and 10. In 2014 she played in six games, including her starting debut against New South Wales Swifts in Round 3.

=== Garville ===
Between 2013 and 2015, while playing for Adelaide Thunderbirds and Southern Force, Poolman also played for Garville in the Netball South Australia Premier League.

=== Giants Netball ===
Between 2017 and 2021, Poolman played for Giants Netball in Suncorp Super Netball. In 2017 Poolman was vice captain of the Giants team that finished as runners up in the new league's inaugural season. She subsequently shared the Giants Members' Player of the Year award with Joanne Harten. In 2018 she was a member of the Giants team that finished as minor premiers. Poolman made her 50th senior national league appearance in the 2018 Round 9 match against Adelaide Thunderbirds. While playing for Giants, Poolman also served as a player delegate for the Australian Netball Players Association. Poolman made her 100th senior national league appearance in a 2021 Round 13 match. She subsequently played for Giants in the 2021 grand final. In September 2021, she announced her retirement as an elite netball player.

=== Australia ===
Between 2007 and 2011, Poolman represented Australia at under-17, under-19 and under-21 levels. She also played for Australia at both the 2017 and 2018 Fast5 Netball World Series tournaments. She captained Australia at the latter tournament.

Tournaments	Place
2017 Fast5 Netball World Series	3rd place, bronze medalist(s)
2018 Fast5 Netball World Series	3rd place, bronze medalist(s)

== Coach ==
Since 2017 Poolman has led and coached with the ASPIRE Development Program. The program provides netball coaching for 11 to 17-year-olds based in the Hunter Region.

== Personal life ==
Poolman is in a relationship with Ben Kennedy.

== Honours ==
Adelaide Thunderbirds

- ANZ Championship
  - Winners: 2013

Giants Netball

- Suncorp Super Netball
  - Runners up: 2017, 2021
  - Minor premiers: 2018, 2021

New South Wales

- Australian National Netball Championships
  - Winners: Under-17 (2007), Under-19 (2008, 2009), Under-21 (2010, 2011)
