= Laura Clemesha =

Australian netball player

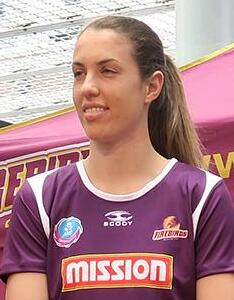
- Laura Clemesha with the Queensland Firebirds in 2015

Personal information
- Born: 21 January 1992 (age 34) Toowoomba, Queensland
- Height: 1.90 m (6 ft 3 in)

Netball career
- Playing positions: GK, GD
Years	Club team	Apps
2013–2019	Queensland Firebirds	

Laura Clemesha (born 21 January 1992) is a retired Australian netball player.

== Career ==
Clemesha grew up in the south-eastern Queensland city of Toowoomba and was school captain of her private secondary school Downlands College, before moving to the Sunshine Coast for university and her netball career. She debuted for the Queensland Firebirds in the ANZ Championship competition in 2013 and was part of the team's back-to-back premiership successes in 2015 and 2016. After being utilised off the bench in those years, Clemesha was re-signed to a more high-profile role ahead of the 2017 season, replacing long-time captain Laura Geitz at goal keeper. She continued to play in that role for several years before announcing her retirement at the end of the 2019 season.

Clemesha came out as gay in 2017 in a piece for her local newspaper The Caboolture News.

Clemesha completed a Bachelor of Psychological Science (Class 1 Honours) in 2017 and a Master of Organisational Psychology in 2020 at the University of Queensland.
