= Ashlee Weir =

Australian netball player

Ashlee Weir (née Mann)
Personal information
- Born: 29 April 1988 (age 38)
- Occupations: Teacher William Clarke college Sydney, nsw
- Height: 1.76 m (5 ft 9 1/2 in)

Netball career
- Playing positions: C, WD, WA
Years	Club team	Apps
2009, 2013	New South Wales Swifts	
- Updated on 2009-04-22

Ashlee Weir (née Mann) (born 29 April 1988) is an Australian netball player in the ANZ Championship, playing for the New South Wales Swifts. She played in the 2009 ANZ Festival of Stars as Centre after Marianne McCormick was injured during the second half of the game.

A Baulkham Hills (BHSNA) netball junior, Ashlee returned to ANZ Championship action in 2013 after playing for the NSW Swifts in 2009.

Weir is a long-time New South Wales representative having taken the court for her home state in the 17/U, 19/U and 21/U age groups, as well as helping Manly-Warringah to three consecutive Dooleys State League's Waratah Cup titles.

Weir has also represented NSW in the Australian Netball League in both the Netball NSW Blues (2008, 2010) and NSW Waratahs (2009, 2012), most recently helping the NNSW Waratahs to finish Runners-Up in the 2012 ANL season alongside her new NSW Swifts teammates April Letton and Melissa Tallent.

== Netball Career Highlights ==
- 2009, 2012 -2013 NSW Waratahs team
- 2009-2011 DOOLEYS State League Premiers with Manly Warringah
- 2009 NSW Swifts
- 2008, 2010 NNSW Blues ANL team
- Australian Schoolgirls Team
