= Joanna Sutton =

Australian netball player

Personal information
- Born: 13 July 1986 (age 40) Sydney, Australia
- Height: 1.80 m (5 ft 11 in)
- Relative: John Sutton (brother)

Netball career
- Playing positions: WD, C
Years	Club team	Apps
2004–05	AIS Canberra Darters	
2006	Sydney Swifts	
2009–present	Adelaide Thunderbirds	
- Updated on 7 March 2010

Joanna Sutton (born 13 July 1986) is an Australian netball player in the ANZ Championship, playing for the Adelaide Thunderbirds. Sutton previously played for the Sydney Swifts (2006) and the AIS Canberra Darters (2004–05) in the Commonwealth Bank Trophy. She is of Rotuman and Australian parentage. She is the sister of National Rugby League player John Sutton.

Sutton returns home to join the NSW Swifts for the 2012 ANZ Championship.

The former AIS and Australian 21/U representative is a NSW junior, having started her netball career with Randwick at the age of seven.

A three-year stint with the Adelaide Thunderbirds (2009 – 2011) saw Sutton named in the Australian Diamonds squad for the first time in her debut ANZ Championship season.

Her 2010 season was cut short after she ruptured her Achilles tendon in round one, ruling her out for the season and sidelining her for the Thunderbirds premiership tilt. A thorough rehabilitation process saw her make a successful return in 2011, playing 12 games during the season.

== Netball career highlights ==
- 2009 Australian Diamonds squad
- Consecutive premierships with the Sydney Swifts (2006-2007)
- Australian 21/U squad
- 2004 Australian Institute of Sport scholarship recipient
