= Paige Hadley =

Australian international netball player (born 1992)

Personal information
- Full name: Paige Amber Hadley
- Born: 26 August 1992 (age 34) Sydney, Australia
- Occupation: Netball player
- Height: 173 cm (5 ft 8 in)
- School: Hills Sports High School/St Marys Senior High School
- University: Western Sydney University

Netball career
- Playing positions: C, WA, WD
Years	Club team	Apps
2012–present	NSW Swifts	21
Years	National team	Caps
2013	Australian Under 21	
Medal record
Representing Australia
Netball World Championships
Gold medal – first place	2015 Australia	Team
Silver medal – second place	2019 Liverpool	Team
Gold medal – first place	2023 Cape Town	Team
Commonwealth Games
Gold medal – first place	2022 Birmingham	Netball
World Netball Series
Silver medal – second place	2013 New Zealand	Fastnet
World Youth Cup
Silver medal – second place	2013 Glasgow	Netball

Paige Amber Hadley (born 26 August 1992) is an Australian international netball player. Primarily a wing attack and centre player, Hadley is a member of the Australian national team and plays in the Suncorp Super Netball for the New South Wales Swifts, for which she also serves as the club's Australian Netball Players' Association delegate.

== Early life ==
Born in Sydney, Hadley was started playing netball at the age of seven and later became a Penrith District Netball Association junior. While still in school she got an Australian Tertiary Admission Rank of 97.8 and was offered a scholarship to study at Western Sydney University. She obtained Bachelor of Business & Commerce degree while being on the professional netball team at the same time.

== Career ==
Paige Hadley began her netball career as a replacement player while still enrolled in Western Sydney University. A dynamic midcourter, Paige rose to prominence in the Australian Netball League, by replacing Breeana Powell for the NNSW Blues in 2010, before being named in the Netball NSW Waratahs 2011 team, helping the team to its maiden ANL title. Paige took up a scholarship with the Australian Institute of Sport in 2012, and in addition to making her ANZ Championship debut for the NSW Swifts – when called into the side as a temporary replacement player, she was named in the Australian 21/U team. She signed with the NSW Swifts for the 2013 ANZ Championship season, which was followed by her seven appearances for the team in 2014 as an injury replacement player, especially at the 2014 Commonwealth Games where she replaced Madi Robinson. In 2013 she sustained a knee injury after a game against Malawi.

Paige has represented NSW at National Netball Championships throughout the 17/U, 19/U and 21/U age groups, winning numerous titles, including the 2012 21/U National Netball Championship crown alongside fellow 2013 New South Wales Swifts recruit Melissa Tallent.

During her first ANZ Championship season as a contracted player in 2013, Paige was named in the Australian 21/U Team for the 2013 World Youth Netball Championships, and following the conclusion of the domestic season, was selected in her first Australian Diamonds Squad. Her 2013 ANZ Championship season was capped off with winning the first NSW Swifts Coaches' Award.

Continuing an incredible year in 2013, Paige was named in her first Australian Diamonds side, and made her senior international debut on Wednesday 16 October when she entered the game at WA at halftime, helping the Diamonds defeat the Malawi Queens 83–34 in Wollongong.

In just her second game for the Australian Diamonds (v Malawi Queens, 19 October), Paige was named the game Most Valuable Player.

On 20 October 2013 Paige capped off a good year by being named Australian 21/U Player of the Year at the Australian Netball Awards held on the Gold Coast.

On 6 March 2014, after helping the Swifts to victory in Round 1 of the 2014 ANZ Championship, Paige suffered ruptured her left anterior cruciate ligament at training and was ruled out of the remainder of the 2014 season. She made a successful comeback from the injury in 2015.

In 2015 Paige had helped Australia to win the 2015 Netball World Cup.

In 2018 she injured her ankle and therefore was unable to make it to the 2018 Commonwealth Games.

== Personal life ==
As a resident of St Clair, New South Wales, Paige's favorite TV shows are The Bachelor and One Tree Hill. She also likes to eat chocolate, pasta and cakes. When it comes to music, her favorite is Are You with Me by Lost Frequencies. Her dad is a fan of Parramatta Eels.

== ANZ Championship accolades ==
- 2013 NSW Swifts Coaches' Award

== National Representation ==
- 2009 Australian 17/U Squad
- 2011 Australian 19/U team Captain
- 2011-2012 Australian 21/U team
- 2013 Australian 21/U World Youth Championship
- 2013 Australian Fast5 Flyers
- 2013 Australian Diamonds team (Malawi Tests)
- 2015 Australian Diamonds World Cup team

== Netball Career Facts ==
- 2011 NSW Waratahs ANL team – undefeated premiers
- 2011-2012 NSW 21/U team - National Champions & 2012 Vice-Captain
- 2013 Australian 21/U World Youth Championship silver medal
- 2013 Netball Australia 21U Player of the Year
- 2013 Australian Fast5 Flyers – Silver Medalists
- 2015 Australian Diamond World Cup team - Gold Medalists
