= Netball New South Wales Blues =

Defunct Australian netball team

- Founded: 2008
- Based in: Sydney
- Regions: New South Wales
- League: Australian Netball League
Uniform

Netball New South Wales Blues are a former Australian netball team. Between 2008 and 2014, they represented Netball New South Wales in the Australian Netball League. In 2008 they were founder members of the ANL. Together with Netball New South Wales Waratahs they were one of two teams to represent Netball New South Wales in the ANL. Blues were effectively a New South Wales Swifts third team.

== History ==
=== Australian Netball League ===
Between 2008 and 2014, Netball New South Wales Blues represented Netball New South Wales in the Australian Netball League. In 2008 they were founder members of the ANL. Together with Netball New South Wales Waratahs they were one of two teams to represent Netball New South Wales in the ANL.

Regular season statistics

Season	Position	Won	Drawn	Lost
2008				
2009	6th	5	0	5
2010	7th	4	0	6
2011	5th	4	0	4
2012	10th	0	0	9
2013	8th	2	0	8
2014	?	2	0	7

== Notable players ==
=== Internationals ===
Australia

- Kiera Austin
- Paige Hadley
- Kristiana Manu'a
- Kim Ravaillion
- Gabi Simpson

Australia Fast5

- Samantha Poolman
- Amorette Wild

=== New South Wales Swifts ===
- Paige Hadley
- Abbey McCulloch
- Lauren Moore
- Gabi Simpson
- Ashlee Weir
- Amorette Wild

=== Giants Netball ===
- Kiera Austin
- Maddie Hay
- Kristiana Manu'a
- Samantha Poolman

=== Captains ===
Coach	Years
Emily Keenan	2011
Jessica Calderara	2012–2013
Sophie Halpin	2014

=== ANL MVP ===
Season	Player
2008	Narelle Eather

== Head coaches ==
Coach	Years
Tracey Robinson	2009
Lisa Beehag	2010–2011
Robert Wright	2012
Moira Gaha	2013
Briony Akle	2014
