= Elizabeth Manu =

New Zealand netball player

Personal information
- Born: 16 September 1986 (age 39) Wellington, New Zealand
- Height: 1.76 m (5 ft 9 in)
- School: Rangi Ruru Girls' High School
- University: Victoria University

Netball career
- Playing positions: WD, GD
Years	Club team	Apps
2008	Canterbury Tactix	13
2009–present	Central Pulse	26
- Updated on 28 September 2010

Elizabeth "Bessie" Manu (born 16 September 1986 in Wellington, New Zealand) is a New Zealand netball player in the ANZ Championship, playing for the Central Pulse. Manu previously played with the Canterbury Tactix in 2008, after having been a member of the Canterbury Flames team in the National Bank Cup. She is also a former member of the New Zealand Secondary Schools and New Zealand U21 teams.
