= April Brandley =

Australian netball player

Personal information
- Full name: April Brandley (Née: Letton)
- Born: 19 April 1990 (age 36)
- Height: 185 cm (6 ft 1 in)

Netball career
- Playing positions: GK, GD, WD
Years	Club team	Apps
2011	NNSW Waratahs/Queensland Firebirds	
2012–2014	New South Wales Swifts	
2015–2016	West Coast Fever	
2017–2019	Collingwood Magpies	
2020-2023	Giants Netball	
Medal record
Netball World Cup
Silver medal – second place	2019 Liverpool	Netball
Commonwealth Games
Silver medal – second place	2018 Gold Coast	Netball
World Netball Series
Bronze medal – third place	2011 Liverpool	Fastnet

April Brandley (née Letton; born 19 April 1990) is a retired professional Australian netball player in the Suncorp Super Netball league. She played in the positions of GK, GD and WD, and has been selected on several occasions for the Australia national netball team.

== Career ==
=== Domestic ===
Brandley was a temporary replacement player for the Queensland Firebirds in 2011 and played for the New South Wales Swifts in 2012. At the end of the 2014 ANZ Championship season, Brandley signed with the Perth-based West Coast Fever for two seasons. Since 2017 she has played for the Collingwood Magpies. At the Magpies she has established herself as a first-choice defender, and she was re-signed by the club at the end of the 2018 season. After the 2019 season Brandley announced she was pregnant and intended to step away from the game in 2020. However she returned to the game the following year as a training partner for Giants Netball, after the start of the Super Netball season was pushed back to August due to the COVID-19 pandemic.

==== Super Netball statistics ====
Statistics are correct to the end of the 2018 season.

Season	Team	G/A	GA	RB	CPR	FD	IC	DF	PN	TO	MP
2017	Magpies	0/0	0	8	36	0	16	56	216	11	15
2018	Magpies	0/0	1	3	44	2	20	39	157	22	13
Career		0/0	1	11	80	2	36	95	373	33	28

=== International ===
She participated in the 2010 World Netball Series and 2011 World Netball Series, both in Liverpool, UK. Her good form at the Collingwood Magpies in the 2018 season resulted in her being was selected in the Australian Diamonds squad for the 2018/19 international season. Brandley was part of the Australian team that finished second and won a silver medal at the 2019 Netball World Cup.

== Accolades ==
=== ANZ Championship accolades ===
- 2012 NSW Swifts Players' Player

=== National team ===
- 2018 Australian Diamonds (2018 Commonwealth Games)
- 2013 Australian Diamonds (Tour of England)
- 2010-2012 Fast5 team

== Netball career facts ==
- Childhood club: Heathcote Waratah NC
- 2011 Diamonds training partner
- 2011 NNSW Waratahs – undefeated premiers
- 2011 NSW 21/U Team captain - premiers
- 2011 21/U National Netball Championship MVP
- 2011 ANZ Championship victory with QLD Firebirds (replacement player)
- 2010 21/U National Netball Championship co-MVP
- 2010 AIS Anne Clark Award
- NSW Representative 2005–2011, winning 11 National Championships
