= Sophia Fenwick =

New Zealand netball player

Personal information
- Born: 12 December 1992 (age 33)
- Height: 1.81 m (5 ft 11 1/2 in)
- School: Rangi Ruru

Netball career
- Playing position: Shooter
Years	Club team	Apps
2010	Canterbury Tactix (TRP)	
2011	Southern Steel	
- Updated on 26 September 2010

Sophia Fenwick (born 12 December 1992) is a New Zealand netball player. Fenwick was a member of the New Zealand Secondary Schools and New Zealand U21 teams in 2010. She was also drafted as a Temporary Replacement Player for the Canterbury Tactix in the 2010 ANZ Championship season, before being offered a contract with the Southern Steel for 2011.

Fenwick attended Rangi Ruru Girls' School.
