= Amorette Wild =

Australian netball player

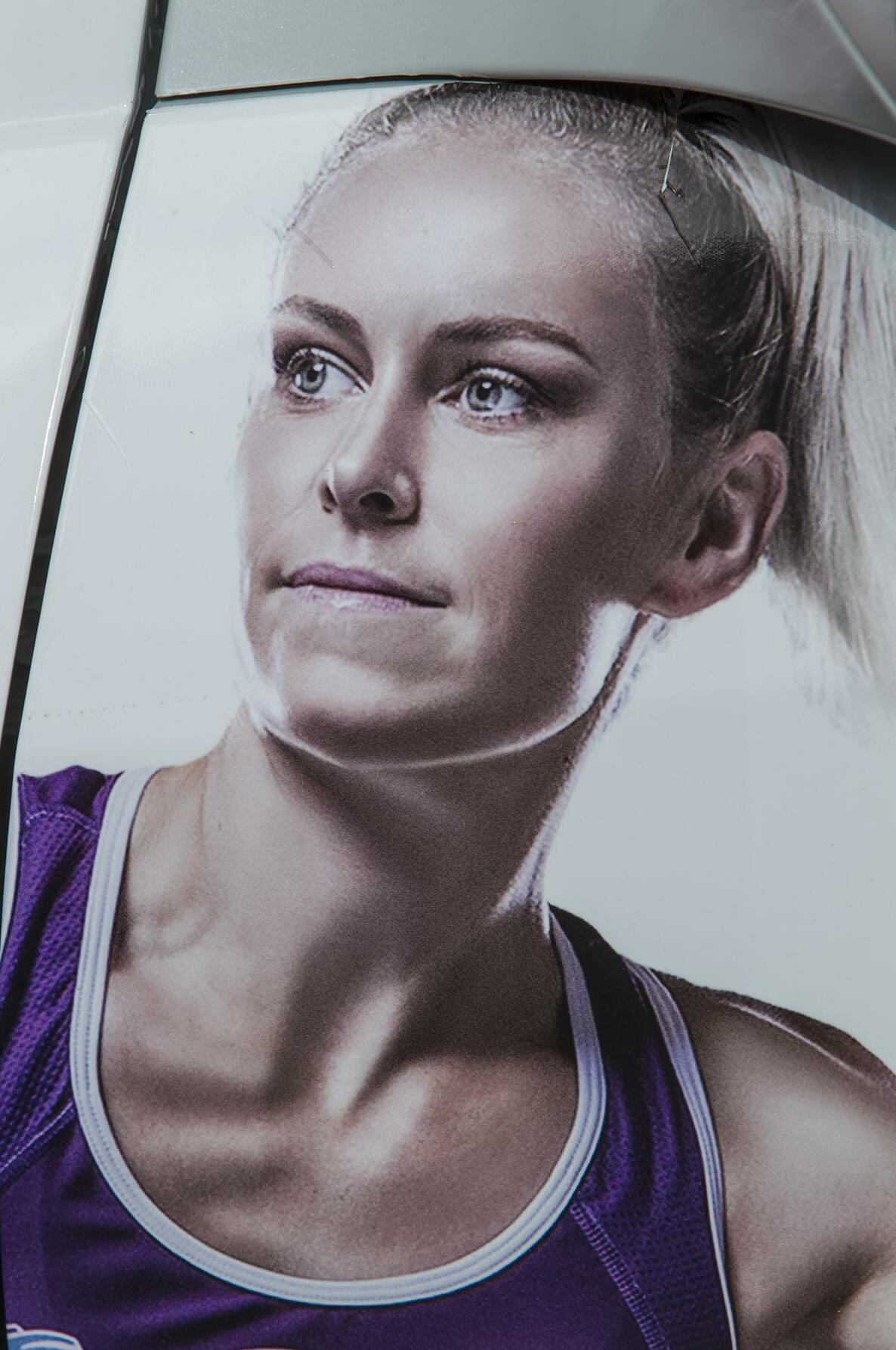

Personal information
- Born: 10 August 1989 (age 37)
- Height: 1.78 m (5 ft 10 in)
- School: Westfields Sports High School

Netball career
- Playing positions: GA, GS, WA
Years	Club team	Apps
2007	Sydney Swifts	
2009	NNSW Blues	
2009–2013	New South Wales Swifts	25?
2010–2011	→ NNSW Waratahs	
2013–2015	Queensland Firebirds	
2018–2019	Central Coast Heart	
Years	National team	Caps
2011–2014	Australia	
Medal record
Representing Australia
Fast5 Netball World Series
Silver medal – second place	2014 Auckland	Team
Bronze medal – third place	2011 Liverpool	Team

Amorette Wild (born 10 August 1989), also known as Amy Wild, is a former Australian netball player. Wild played for both New South Wales Swifts and Queensland Firebirds during the ANZ Championship era. She was a member of the Firebirds team that won the 2015 ANZ Championship. She also represented Australia at under-19, under-21 and Fast5 levels.

== Early life and education ==
Wild attended Westfields Sports High School. Between 2004 and 2006 she attended Western Sydney Academy of Sport.

== Playing career ==
=== New South Wales ===
Wild played for teams representing Eastwood/Ryde, Fairfield and Sutherland Shire. Between 2006 and 2010, Wild represented New South Wales in the Australian National Netball Championships at under-17, under-19 and under-21 levels. She was a member of the under-21 teams that won titles in 2009 and 2010. She captained the team that won the 2010 under-21 title.

=== Sydney Swifts ===
In 2007, aged seventeen, Wild was a member of the Sydney Swifts team that won the final Commonwealth Bank Trophy league title.

=== Australian Netball League ===
Between 2009 and 2011, Wild played for both NNSW Blues and NNSW Waratahs in the Australian Netball League. She played for Blues during the 2009 season before switching to Waratahs for the 2010 and 2011 seasons. In 2010, she captained the Waratahs team that finished as minor premiers and reached the ANL grand final. In the grand final, Wilde scored 23 goals from 25 attempts with a 92% success rate. However Waratahs lost 54–47 to Victorian Fury. She was subsequently named the 2010 ANL MVP. In 2011, Wild was a member of the Waratahs team that won the ANL title.

=== New South Wales Swifts ===
Between 2009 and 2013, Wild played for New South Wales Swifts in the ANZ Championship. On 28 June 2009, she made her Swifts ANZ Championship debut in a 2009 ANZ Championship Round 13 match against Central Pulse. On 26 May 2013, Wild made her 25th ANZ Championship appearance for Swifts in a 2013 ANZ Championship Round 10 match against Northern Mystics.

=== Queensland Firebirds ===
In 2014 and 2015, Wild played for Queensland Firebirds in the ANZ Championship. She was signed by Firebirds as a replacement for Natalie Medhurst. She was a member of the Firebirds teams that were 2014 grand finalists and 2015 ANZ Championship winners.

=== Central Coast Heart ===
In 2018 Wild captained the Central Coast Heart team that won the Netball NSW Premier League title. She was also named the MVP in the grand final and won the Nance Kenny OAM Medal as the league player of the year.

=== Australia ===
Between 2011 and 2014 Wild represented Australia in the Fast5 Netball World Series. She had previously represented Australia at under-19 and under-21 levels.

Tournaments	Place
2011 World Netball Series	3rd place, bronze medalist(s)
2012 Fast5 Netball World Series	6th
2014 Fast5 Netball World Series	2nd place, silver medalist(s)

== Honours ==
Australia

- Fast5 Netball World Series
  - Runners Up: 2014

Queensland Firebirds

- ANZ Championship
  - Winners: 2015
  - Runners Up: 2014

NNSW Waratahs

- Australian Netball League
  - Winners: 2011
  - Runners Up: 2010

Sydney Swifts

- Commonwealth Bank Trophy
  - Winners: 2007

New South Wales

- Australian National Netball Championships
  - Winner: Under-17 (2006), Under-21 (2009, 2010)

Individual

- Australian Netball League MVP
  - Winner: 2010
