= Carla Dziwoki =

Australian netball player

Personal information
- Born: 29 August 1982 (age 44)
- Height: 1.86 m (6 ft 1 in)

Netball career
- Playing positions: GA, GS
| Years | Club team | Apps |
| 2008–2009 | Team Northumbria | |
| 2009 | Queensland Firebirds | |
| 2009–2010 | Leeds Carnegie | |
| 2011 | New South Wales Swifts | |
Medal record
World Netball Series
| Bronze medal – third place | 2011 Liverpool | Team |
| Silver medal – second place | 2013 Auckland | Team |
- Updated on 2009-03-13

Carla Dziwoki (born 29 August 1982) is a former Australian netball player. Dziwoki played with the Queensland Firebirds in the Commonwealth Bank Trophy. She played for Team Northumbria in the 2008–09 Netball Superleague for the . She also played for Leeds Carnegie during the 2009–10 Netball Superleague season. Dziwoki rejoined the Queensland Firebirds for the 2009 ANZ Championship season after Megan Dehn withdrew from the side.

Dziwoki also plays in the Netball NSW Premier League where she represents the Sutherland Shire. Dziwoki will also be representing NSW Waratahs in the Australian Netball League. Carla will play for the NSW Swifts in the 2011 ANZ Championship season. She was also a member of the Australian FastNet Diamonds team which played at the 2011 World Netball Series in Liverpool. After being released by the NSW Swifts at the end of the 2014 ANZ Championship season, Dziwoki signed with the Melbourne Vixens for the 2015 season.

In 2018, she became a contestant on an Australian home renovation television show, The Block, along with fellow netballer Bianca Chatfield.

Dziwoki is the daughter of American basketball player Reg Biddings, who spent his professional career in Australia.

== National Representation ==
- 2011 Australian FastNet team
- 2013 Australian Fast5 Flyers

== Netball Career Facts ==
- 2004 Australian Squad
- 2011 Australian Squad Training Partner
- 2011 NSW Waratahs Captain, Australian Netball League undefeated premiers
- 2013 Australian Fast5 Flyers – Silver Medalists
- 2014 NSW Swifts Leadership Group
