= Swifts Academy =

Australian Netball League team

QBE Swifts Academy
- Founded: 2008
- Based in: Sydney
- Regions: New South Wales
- Home venue: Netball Central; Ken Rosewall Arena
- Head coach: Lenore Blades
- Premierships: 3 (2011, 2024, 2026)
- League: Super Netball Reserves
- Website: nswswifts.com.au
Uniform

The QBE Swifts Academy, formerly the Netball New South Wales Waratahs, is an Australian netball team that represents Netball New South Wales in the Super Netball Reserves competition. The Swifts Academy is the reserve team of Suncorp Super Netball club, the New South Wales Swifts. The team is made up of selected stand-out players from Netball NSW Premier League, NSW Swifts training partners and some contracted NSW Swifts players.

In 2008, they were founding members of the ANL. The side has won three premierships and have been grand finalists on a further five occasions, making them the second most successful team in the secondary competition after the Vixens Academy.

== History ==
=== Australian Netball League ===
In 2011, the Waratahs became the first team other than Victorian Fury to win the Australian Netball League title after defeating them 55–46 in a rematch of the previous year's grand final. The winning Waratahs team was coached by Robert Wright and captained by Carla Dziwoki. Other members of the successful squad included Samantha May, Jessica Mansell, April Letton, Ashleigh Brazill, Paige Hadley, Verity Simmons, Amorette Wild and Tiffany Lincoln.

The team reached a further four ANL grand finals, losing three to Victorian Fury and the other to Southern Force.

=== Australian Netball Championships ===
The Waratahs won the 2024 Australian Netball Championships grand final 58-50 against Capital Darters in Canberra, the club's second premiership coming thirteen years after its inaugural success.

=== Super Netball Reserves ===
The Swifts Academy were victorious in achieving a third premiership, defeating the Sunshine Coast Lightning Bolts 69-55 in the 2026 Super Netball Reserves grand final in front of a home crowd in Sydney.

== Grand finals ==
Season	Winners	Score	Runners up	Venue
2010	Victorian Fury	54–47	NNSW Waratahs	Waverley Netball Centre
2011	NNSW Waratahs	55–46	Victorian Fury	Waverley Netball Centre
2012	Southern Force	50–36	NNSW Waratahs	Waverley Netball Centre
2013	Victorian Fury	56–51	NNSW Waratahs	Netball SA Stadium
2016	Victorian Fury	53–46	NNSW Waratahs	Netball Central
2019	Victorian Fury	54–53	NNSW Waratahs	SNHC
2024	NNSW Waratahs	58–50	Capital Darters	SolarHub ACT Netball Centre
2026	QBE Swifts Academy	69–55	Sunshine Coast Lightning Bolts	Netball Central

== Notable players ==
=== 2026 squad ===
2026 QBE Swifts Academy roster
Players
Coaches

Name	Pos	DOB	Height	Club	Nat	Caps
Charlotte Raleigh (c)	GK, GD		–	North Shore United	(Australia)
Chloe Baker	WA, C		–	Panthers	(Australia)
Nicola Barge (Note: Contracted 11th player for New South Wales Swifts)	GA, GS		–	South West Mounties Magic	(Australia)
Eliza Burton (Note: Training partner for New South Wales Swifts)	C, WA		–	North Shore United	(Australia)
Courtney Castle (vc)	WA, C		–	South West Mounties Magic	(Australia)
Jess Conlan	WA, C		–	ERNA Hawks	(Australia)
Isabella Degei	C, WD		–	South West Mounties Magic	(Australia)
Harlym Jennings	WD, GD		–	Sutherland Stingrays	(Australia)
Isabella Maher	WA, WD, C		–	Sutherland Stingrays	(Australia)
Nevaeh Matenga	WD, C		–	UTS Randwick Sparks	(Australia)
Sophia Martinussen	GS, GA		–	ERNA Hawks	(Australia)
Ava Moller	GS, GA		–	Sutherland Stingrays	(Australia)
Whitney Mueller	GK, GD, WD		–	UTS Randwick Sparks	(Australia)
Paige O’Neill	GD, GK		–	ERNA Hawks	(Australia)
Brooke Patterson	GS, GA		–	North Shore United	(Australia)
Frederika Schneideman (injured)	GD, GK		–	ERNA Hawks	(Australia)
Lauren Woods (vc)	GA, GS		–	North Shore United	(Australia)

Head coach

- (Australia) Lenore Blades

Assistant coach

- (Australia) Sharyn Hill

Notes

- (c) – Captain
- (cc) – Co-captain
- (vc) – Vice-captain
- – Injury / maternity leave
- (TRP) – Temporary Replacement Player
Player profiles: Team website
Last updated: 7 September 2026

=== Internationals ===
Australia

- Ashleigh Brazill
- Taylah Davies
- Sophie Dwyer
- Steph Fretwell (née Wood)
- Paige Hadley
- April Letton
- Kristiana Manu'a

Australia Fast5

- Carla Dziwoki
- Samantha Poolman
- Amorette Wild

Samoa

- Kristiana Manu'a

Scotland

- Hayley Mulheron

=== New South Wales Swifts ===
- Nicola Barge
- Elle Bennetts
- Kimberley Borger
- Ashleigh Brazill
- Kaitlyn Bryce
- Sophie Craig (née Halpin)
- Taylah Davies
- Carla Dziwoki
- Sophie Fawns
- Tayla Fraser
- Steph Fretwell (née Wood)
- Lili Gorman-Brown
- Kirstie Guthrie
- Paige Hadley
- Maddie Hay
- Emily Keenan
- April Letton
- Tiffany Lincoln
- Amorangi Malesala
- Jessica Mansell
- Samantha May
- Abbey McCulloch
- Lauren Moore
- Claire O'Brien
- Teigan O'Shannassy
- Frederika Schneideman
- Leah Shoard
- Kelly Singleton
- Amy Sommerville
- Nicole Styles
- Ashlee Weir
- Grace Whyte
- Amorette Wild
- Lauren Woods

=== ANL MVP ===
The following Waratahs players were awarded competition MVP.

Season	Player
2010	Amorette Wild
2012	Kristy Guthrie
2014	Kristina Brice
2016	Vanessa Mullampy
2024	Millie Tonkin
2025 (joint)	Frederika Schneideman

== Head coaches ==
Coach	Years
Rob Wright	c. 2011
Sue Hawkins	2012
Anita Keelan	2013-2015
Briony Akle	2016–2017
Colleen Mitchell	2018
Lenore Blades	2019-present

== Premierships ==
- Australian Netball League
  - Winners: 2011
  - Runners up: 2010, 2012, 2013, 2016, 2019
- Australian Netball Championships
  - Winners: 2024
- Super Netball Reserves
  - Winners: 2026
