= 2009 Adelaide Thunderbirds season =

Adelaide Thunderbirds season

Adelaide Thunderbirds
- 2009 season
- Head coach: Jane Woodlands-Thompson
- Asst. coaches: Lisa Alexander; Louise Souter
- Captain: Natalie von Bertouch
- Main venue: ETSA Park

Season results
- Wins–losses: 12–4
- Regular season: 3rd
- Finals placing: 2nd
- Team colours

Adelaide Thunderbirds seasons
- ← 2008 2010 →

The 2009 Adelaide Thunderbirds season saw Adelaide Thunderbirds compete in the 2009 ANZ Championship. After winning ten games, Thunderbirds finished third, behind Melbourne Vixens and Waikato Bay of Plenty Magic, during the regular season. They subsequently defeated Southern Steel in the minor semi-final and Magic in the preliminary final before losing to Vixens in the grand final.

== Players ==
=== Player movements ===
▲ Gains	▼ Losses
Jane Altschwager Retirement; Laura von Bertouch Retirement; Joanna Sutton Retirement; Sheree Wingard	Alex Clarke Retirement; Mandy Edwards; Kristen Hughes

=== 2009 roster ===
2010 Adelaide Thunderbirds roster
Players
Coaching staff

Nat.	Name	Position(s)	DoB	Height
(Australia)	Jane Altschwager	GS, GA	25 August 1980 (aged 28)	1.93 m (6 ft 4 in)
(Australia)	Jo Baldwin	WD, C		–
(Australia)	Emily Beaton	C, WA	9 April 1987 (aged 21)	1.80 m (5 ft 11 in)
(Australia)	Georgia Beaton	GD, WD	22 June 1990 (aged 18)	1.85 m (6 ft 1 in)
(Australia)	Laura von Bertouch	C, WA	4 December 1980 (aged 28)	1.67 m (5 ft 6 in)
(Australia)	Natalie von Bertouch (c)	C, WA, WD	16 December 1982 (aged 26)	1.75 m (5 ft 9 in)
(Australia)	Kate Beveridge	GS, GA, WA	25 July 1985 (aged 23)	1.90 m (6 ft 3 in)
(Australia)	Mo'onia Gerrard	GD, WD	15 November 1980 (aged 28)	1.80 m (5 ft 11 in)
(Australia)	Natalie Medhurst	GA, GS	20 January 1984 (aged 25)	1.78 m (5 ft 10 in)
(England)	Geva Mentor	GK, GD, WD	17 September 1984 (aged 24)	1.91 m (6 ft 3 in)
(Australia)	Kirby Mutton	WD, C, WA	17 September 1984 (aged 24)	1.72 m (5 ft 8 in)
(Australia)	Bianca Reddy	GD, WD, GK	21 December 1982 (aged 26)	1.85 m (6 ft 1 in)
(Australia)	Joanna Sutton	WD, C	13 July 1986 (aged 22)	1.80 m (5 ft 11 in)
(Australia)	Sheree Wingard	WA, C	18 August 1988 (aged 20)	1.70 m (5 ft 7 in)
(Australia)	Melissa Rowland	GA, GS	18 May 1989 (aged 19)	1.86 m (6 ft 1 in)
(Australia)	Beth Shimmin		18 March 1987 (aged 22)	1.76 m (5 ft 9 in)
(Australia)	Kate Shimmin	GK, GD	13 February 1992 (aged 17)	1.85 m (6 ft 1 in)
(Australia)	Nikki Wood			–

Head coach

- (Australia) Jane Woodlands-Thompson

Assistant coaches

- (Australia) Lisa Alexander
- (Australia) Louise Souter

Notes

- (c) – Captain
- (cc) – Co-captain
- (vc) – Vice-captain
- – Injury / maternity leave
- (TRP) – Temporary Replacement Player

== Pre-season ==
In March 2009, Adelaide Thunderbirds played in the 2009 SOPA Cup, hosted by Netball New South Wales at the Sydney Olympic Park Sports Centre. Thunderbirds finished second in the tournament behind New South Wales Swifts.

== Regular season ==
=== Fixtures and results ===
Round 1

Sunday 5 April, 2:30 pm	Queensland Firebirds	48–60	Adelaide Thunderbirds	Brisbane Convention and Exhibition Centre
2:30 pm	Romelda Aiken 33/37 (89%); Janelle Lawson 15/23 (65%)	Report; Stats	Kate Beveridge 32/42 (76%); Natalie Medhurst 28/33 (85%)

Round 2

Sunday 12 April	Adelaide Thunderbirds	48–47	New South Wales Swifts	ETSA Park
2:00 pm	Kate Beveridge 25/30 (83%); Natalie Medhurst 23/25 (92%)	Report; Stats	Catherine Cox 26/30 (87%); Susan Pratley 21/23 (91%)

Round 3

Sunday 19 April	Adelaide Thunderbirds	43–49	Melbourne Vixens	ETSA Park
14:00 (UTC+10)	Kate Beveridge 28/37 (76%); Natalie Medhurst 15/19 (79%)	Report; Stats	Sharelle McMahon 21/28 (75%); Caitlin Thwaites 28/35 (80%)

Round 4

Monday 27 April	Canterbury Tactix	48–53	Adelaide Thunderbirds	CBS Canterbury Arena
7:00 pm	Jodi Brown 37/47 (79%); Anna Thompson 11/15 (73%)	Q4: 42–42; Report; Stats	Kate Beveridge 20/29 (69%); Natalie Medhurst 28/36 (78%); Jane Altschwager 5/9 (56%)

Round 5

Sunday 3 May	Melbourne Vixens	50–42	Adelaide Thunderbirds	Hisense Arena
14:30 (UTC+10)	Sharelle McMahon 17/21 (81%); Caitlin Thwaites 29/34 (85%); Ashlee Howard 4/4 (100%)	Stats	Kate Beveridge 28/37 (76%); Natalie Medhurst 15/19 (79%)

Round 6

Sunday 10 May	New South Wales Swifts	40–51	Adelaide Thunderbirds	Sydney Olympic Park Sports Centre
2:30 pm	Catherine Cox 9/15 (60%); Susan Pratley 22/27 (81%); Erin Bell 9/16 (56%)	Report; Stats	Kate Beveridge 43/47 (91%); Natalie Medhurst 8/10 (80%)

Round 7

Adelaide Thunderbirds received a bye.

Round 8

Sunday 24 May	Adelaide Thunderbirds	51–50	Queensland Firebirds	ETSA Park
2:00 pm	Kate Beveridge 35/43 (81%); Natalie Medhurst 11/14 (79%); Jane Altschwager 5/7 (71%)	Report; Stats	Romelda Aiken 43/54 (80%); Alissa Castrisos 7/11 (64%)

Round 9

Monday 1 June	West Coast Fever	41–61	Adelaide Thunderbirds	Challenge Stadium
6:00 pm	Caitlin Bassett 25/31 (81%); Bianca Franklin 13/18 (72%); Nikala Smith 3/3 (100%)	Report; Stats	Kate Beveridge 28/38 (74%); Natalie Medhurst 33/39 (85%)

Round 10

Saturday 6 June	Adelaide Thunderbirds	58–34	Northern Mystics	Distinctive Homes Dome
1:30 pm	Kate Beveridge 26/35 (74%); Natalie Medhurst 32/37 (86%)	Report; Stats	Cathrine Latu 23/30 (77%); Pamela Cookey 11/16 (69%)

Round 11

Sunday 14 June	Adelaide Thunderbirds	58–39	West Coast Fever	ETSA Park
2:00 pm	Jane Altschwager 37/49 (76%); Kate Beveridge 5/12 (42%); Natalie Medhurst 16/17 (94%)	Report; Stats	Caitlin Bassett 28/31 (90%); Nikala Smith 10/13 (77%); Bianca Franklin 1/6 (17%)

Round 12

Saturday 20 June	Adelaide Thunderbirds	70–40	Central Pulse	ETSA Park
1:30 pm	Kate Beveridge 41/47 (87%); Natalie Medhurst 29/32 (91%)	Report; Stats	Paula Griffin 19/28 (68%); Te Amo Amaru-Tibble 21/26 (81%)

Round 13

Monday 29 June	Southern Steel	58–49	Adelaide Thunderbirds	Edgar Centre
7:00 pm	Donna Wilkins 36/41 (88%); Megan Dehn 22/28 (79%)	Report; Stats	Kate Beveridge 26/31 (84%); Natalie Medhurst 23/26 (88%)

Round 14

Sunday 5 July	Adelaide Thunderbirds	54–35	Waikato Bay of Plenty Magic	Distinctive Homes Dome
2:00 pm	Kate Beveridge 29/35 (83%); Natalie Medhurst 25/29 (86%)	Report; Stats	Irene van Dyk 19/24 (79%); Maria Tutaia 16/23 (70%)

=== Final table ===
2009 ANZ Championship ladder
Pos	Team	Pld	W	D	L	GF	GA	G%	Pts
1	Melbourne Vixens	13	12	0	1	769	614	125.24	24
2	Waikato Bay of Plenty Magic	13	11	0	2	673	562	119.75	22
3	Adelaide Thunderbirds	13	10	0	3	698	579	120.55	20
4	Southern Steel	13	8	0	5	662	645	102.64	16
5	Queensland Firebirds	13	8	0	5	700	690	101.45	16
6	Canterbury Tactix	13	5	0	8	639	662	96.53	10
7	West Coast Fever	13	5	0	8	666	735	90.61	10
8	Northern Mystics	13	3	0	10	642	727	88.31	6
9	New South Wales Swifts	13	2	0	11	709	748	94.79	4
10	Central Pulse	13	1	0	12	594	790	75.19	2
Updated 20 February 2021

Qualified for Major semi-final
Qualified for Minor semi-final

- Pld = Games played
- W = Win (2 points)
- D = Draw (1 point)
- L = Loss (0 points)
- GF = Goals For (Total goals scored)
- GA = Goals Against (Total goals conceded)
- G% = Goal percentage (= 100 × GF/GA)
- Pts = Points

== Playoffs ==
=== Minor semi-final ===
Monday 13 July; 18:30 (UTC+9:30)	Stats	Adelaide Thunderbirds	51–45	Southern Steel	ETSA Park
Monday 13 July; 18:30 (UTC+9:30)	Stats	Scoring by quarter: 12-11, 15-11, 11-10, 13-13			ETSA Park
Monday 13 July; 18:30 (UTC+9:30)	Stats	Kate Beveridge 31/36 (86%); Natalie Medhurst 20/21 (95%)		Megan Dehn 23/27 (85%); Donna Wilkins 22/24 (92%)	ETSA Park

=== Preliminary final ===
Sunday 19 July; 19:00 (UTC+12)	Stats	Waikato Bay of Plenty Magic	37–51	Adelaide Thunderbirds	Mystery Creek Events Centre
Sunday 19 July; 19:00 (UTC+12)	Stats	Scoring by quarter: 8-11, 10-13, 8-14, 11-13			Mystery Creek Events Centre
Sunday 19 July; 19:00 (UTC+12)	Stats	Irene van Dyk 25/26 (96%); Maria Tutaia 12/17 (71%)		Kate Beveridge 28/30 (93%); Natalie Medhurst 22/25 (88%); Jane Altschwager 1/2 (50%)	Mystery Creek Events Centre

=== Grand final ===
Sunday 26 July; 14:30 (UTC+10)	Stats	Melbourne Vixens	54–46	Adelaide Thunderbirds	Hisense Arena; Attendance: 9,500
Sunday 26 July; 14:30 (UTC+10)	Stats	Scoring by quarter: 13-13, 14-6, 14-13, 13-14			Hisense Arena; Attendance: 9,500
Sunday 26 July; 14:30 (UTC+10)	Stats	Caitlin Thwaites 31/39 (79%); Sharelle McMahon 23/28 (82%)		Kate Beveridge 28/34 (82%); Natalie Medhurst 18/23 (78%); Jane Altschwager 1/2 (50%)	Hisense Arena; Attendance: 9,500

== Award winners ==
=== Australian Netball Awards ===
Award	Winner
Australian ANZ Championship Player of the Year	Natalie von Bertouch
