= 2013 Adelaide Thunderbirds season =

Adelaide Thunderbirds season

Adelaide Thunderbirds
- 2013 season
- Head coach: Jane Woodlands-Thompson
- Asst. coach: Dan Ryan; Judy Greenwood; Tania Obst
- Manager: Catherine Foreman
- Captain: Natalie von Bertouch
- Main venue: Netball SA Stadium

Season results
- Wins–losses: 14–1
- Regular season: 1st
- Finals placing: 1st
- Team colours

Adelaide Thunderbirds seasons
- ← 2012 2014 →

The 2013 Adelaide Thunderbirds season saw Adelaide Thunderbirds compete in the 2013 ANZ Championship. With a team captained by Natalie von Bertouch and featuring Erin Bell, Carla Borrego, Renae Hallinan, Rebecca Bulley and Sharni Layton, Adelaide Thunderbirds won both the minor premiership and the overall championship. Having previously won the 2010 ANZ Championship, Thunderbirds became the first team to win a second championship. Thunderbirds secured the minor premiership with a 64–48 win over Northern Mystics in Round 13. They subsequently defeated Melbourne Vixens 49–39 in the major semi-final and Queensland Firebirds 50–48 in the grand final to win the championship.

== Players ==
=== Player movements ===
Gains and losses
▲ Gains	▼ Losses
Laura Packard (Southern Force); Samantha Poolman (NNSW Waratahs); Stephanie Puopolo (Victorian Fury); Leigh Waddington (Southern Force)	Cody Lange (Australian Institute of Sport); Maddy Proud (Australian Institute of Sport); Amehlia Schmidt (Southern Force/AIS); Melissa Rowland

=== 2013 roster ===
2013 Adelaide Thunderbirds roster
Players
Coaching staff

Nat.	Name	Position(s)	DoB	Height
(Australia)	Emily Beaton	C, WA	9 April 1987 (aged 25)	1.80 m (5 ft 11 in)
(Australia)	Erin Bell	GA, WA, GS	26 October 1985 (aged 27)	1.78 m (5 ft 10 in)
(Jamaica)	Carla Borrego	GA, GS	11 November 1983 (aged 29)	1.93 m (6 ft 4 in)
(Australia)	Natalie von Bertouch (c)	C, WA, WD	16 December 1982 (aged 30)	1.75 m (5 ft 9 in)
(Australia)	Rebecca Bulley (vc)	GD, GK, WD	18 August 1982 (aged 30)	1.86 m (6 ft 1 in)
(Australia)	Renae Hallinan (vc)	WD, C	18 July 1986 (aged 26)	1.77 m (5 ft 10 in)
(Australia)	Sharni Layton	GK, GD, WD	6 January 1988 (aged 25)	1.88 m (6 ft 2 in)
(Australia)	Laura Packard	GA, GS		–
(Australia)	Samantha Poolman	GK, GD	4 March 1991 (aged 22)	1.89 m (6 ft 2 in)
(Australia)	Stephanie Puopolo	GA, GS		–
(Australia)	Kate Shimmin	GK, GD	13 February 1992 (aged 21)	1.85 m (6 ft 1 in)
(Australia)	Leigh Waddington	WD, C		–

Head coach

- (Australia) Jane Woodlands-Thompson

Assistant coach

- (Australia) Dan Ryan
  (Australia) Judy Greenwood
  (Australia) Tania Obst

Manager:
Catherine Foreman
Operations Manager:
Rebekah Webster
Physiotherapist:
Andrew Hopkins
Strength and conditioning:
Andrew Maynard
Damian Maynard
Performance Analysis:
Tim Rawlins
Doctor:
Dr Angela Moran
Dietician:
Natalie von Bertouch
Chaplain:
Emma George
Leadership Coordinator:
Karen Betro

Notes

- (c) – Captain
- (cc) – Co-captain
- (vc) – Vice-captain
- – Injury / maternity leave
- (TRP) – Temporary Replacement Player

Notes

- ^1 Laura Packard, Samantha Poolman and Stephanie Puopolo were also members of the 2013 Southern Force squad.
- ^2 Kate Shimmin was also in the 2013 Australian Institute of Sport squad.

=== Milestones ===
- Erin Bell became the first player to win three ANZ Championship titles She won her first title with the 2008 New South Wales Swifts and her second with the 2010 Adelaide Thunderbirds.
- Natalie von Bertouch announced she was retiring as a player shortly after the grand final.

== Melbourne Vixens Summer Challenge ==
The main pre-season event was the Summer Challenge, hosted by Melbourne Vixens at the State Netball Hockey Centre on 23 and 24 February.

Saturday 23 February	New South Wales Swifts	28–35	Adelaide Thunderbirds	State Netball Hockey Centre

Saturday 23 February	Melbourne Vixens	35–27	Adelaide Thunderbirds	State Netball Hockey Centre

Sunday 24 February	Adelaide Thunderbirds	41–37	Canterbury Tactix	State Netball Hockey Centre

Sunday 24 February	Queensland Firebirds	38–30	Adelaide Thunderbirds	State Netball Hockey Centre

== Regular season ==
=== Fixtures and results ===
Round 1

Sunday 24 March	Adelaide Thunderbirds	49 – 42	Central Pulse	Netball SA Stadium
1:40 pm	Erin Bell 21/26 (81%); Carla Borrego 28/30 (93%)	Stats	Caitlin Thwaites 23/28 (82%); Donna Wilkins 19/19 (100%)

Round 2

Sunday 31 March	Melbourne Vixens	58 – 44	Adelaide Thunderbirds	Hisense Arena
12:10 pm	Tegan Caldwell 22/24 (92%); Karyn Howarth 36/41 (88%)	Stats	Erin Bell 25/29 (86%); Carla Borrego 17/20 (85%); Stephanie Puopolo 2/2 (100%)

Round 3

Saturday 6 April	Southern Steel	54 – 60	Adelaide Thunderbirds	Lion Foundation Arena
4:20 pm	Jhaniele Fowler 41/45 (91%); Jodi Brown 13/14 (93%)	Stats	Carla Borrego 36/42 (86%); Erin Bell 24/29 (83%)

Round 4

Sunday 14 April	Adelaide Thunderbirds	72 – 46	West Coast Fever	Netball SA Stadium
11:40 am	Erin Bell 25/29 (86%); Carla Borrego 43/46 (93%); Laura Packard 4/7 (57%)	Stats	Caitlin Bassett 35/41 (85%); Catherine Cox 11/16 (69%)

Round 5

Sunday 21 April	Adelaide Thunderbirds	39 – 38	Melbourne Vixens	Netball SA Stadium
11:40 am	Carla Borrego 22/27 (81%); Erin Bell 17/24 (71%)	Stats	Tegan Caldwell 21/23 (91%); Erin Hoare 11/14 (79%); Sharelle McMahon 6/11 (55%)

Round 6

Sunday 28 April	Queensland Firebirds	53 – 54	Adelaide Thunderbirds	Brisbane Convention and Exhibition Centre
12:10 pm	Romelda Aiken 46/49 (94%); Natalie Medhurst 7/10 (70%)	Stats	Carla Borrego 29/32 (91%); Erin Bell 25/31 (81%)

Round 7

Monday 6 May	Adelaide Thunderbirds	45 – 33	Waikato Bay of Plenty Magic	Netball SA Stadium
7:10 pm	Carla Borrego 29/35 (83%); Erin Bell 16/23 (70%)	Stats	Irene van Dyk 13/16 (81%); Ellen Halpenny 12/18 (67%); Jess Waitapu 8/14 (57%)

Round 8

Sunday 12 May	West Coast Fever	47 – 49	Adelaide Thunderbirds	Challenge Stadium
12:10 pm	Caitlin Bassett 35/39 (90%); Catherine Cox 12/16 (75%)	Stats	Carla Borrego 29/29 (100%); Erin Bell 20/28 (71%)

Round 9

Sunday 19 May	Adelaide Thunderbirds	50 – 48	New South Wales Swifts	Netball SA Stadium
1:40 pm	Carla Borrego 30/33 (91%); Erin Bell 20/27 (74%)	Stats	Melissa Tallent 10/11 (91%); Susan Pratley 29/35 (83%); Carla Dziwoki 9/12 (75%)

Round 10

Monday 27 May	Canterbury Tactix	58 – 62	Adelaide Thunderbirds	Lion Foundation Arena
7:40 pm	Sophia Fenwick 33/44 (75%); Joanne Harten 25/30 (83%)	Report; Stats	Carla Borrego 45/50 (90%); Erin Bell 11/16 (69%); Laura Packard 6/13 (46%); Stephanie Puopolo 0/2 (0%)

Round 11

Sunday 2 June	New South Wales Swifts	43 – 46	Adelaide Thunderbirds	Allphones Arena
12:10 pm	Susan Pratley 26/29 (90%); Carla Dziwoki 14/16 (88%); Melissa Tallent 3/5 (60%)	Report; Stats	Carla Borrego 31/33 (94%); Erin Bell 15/16 (94%)

Round 12

Adelaide Thunderbirds received a bye.

Round 13

Sunday 16 June	Adelaide Thunderbirds	64 – 48	Northern Mystics	Netball SA Stadium
1:40 pm	Carla Borrego 45/50 (90%); Erin Bell 19/23 (83%)	Report; Stats	Bailey Mes 38/43 (88%); Maria Tutaia 10/16 (63%)

Round 14

Sunday 23 June	Adelaide Thunderbirds	54 – 52	Queensland Firebirds	Netball SA Stadium
1:40 pm	Carla Borrego 33/35 (94%); Erin Bell 21/28 (75%)	Stats	Romelda Aiken 44/49 (90%); Natalie Medhurst 8/10 (80%)

=== Final table ===
2013 ANZ Championship ladder
Pos	Team	Pld	W	L	GF	GA	GD	G%	Pts
1	Adelaide Thunderbirds	13	12	1	688	620	+68	111.0	24
2	Melbourne Vixens	13	9	4	692	589	+103	117.5	18
3	Waikato Bay of Plenty Magic	13	9	4	749	650	+99	115.2	18
4	Queensland Firebirds	13	9	4	793	691	+102	114.8	18
5	Central Pulse	13	8	5	736	706	+30	104.2	16
6	Southern Steel	13	6	7	812	790	+22	102.8	12
7	West Coast Fever	13	5	8	715	757	−42	94.5	10
8	New South Wales Swifts	13	4	9	652	672	−20	97.0	8
9	Canterbury Tactix	13	2	11	700	882	−182	79.4	4
10	Northern Mystics	13	1	12	699	879	−180	79.5	2
Updated 7 April 2021

Qualified for Major semi-final
Qualified for Minor semi-final

- Pld = Games played
- W = Win (2 points)
- L = Loss (0 points)
- GF = Goals For
- GA = Goals Against
- GD = Goals Difference (= GF−GA)
- G% = Goal percentage (= 100 × GF/GA)

Pts = Points

== Finals ==
Semifinals
30 June – Netball SA Stadium
Adelaide Thunderbirds	49
Melbourne Vixens	39
1 July – Claudelands Arena
Waikato Bay of Plenty Magic	50
Queensland Firebirds	53

Preliminary final
7 July – Parkville Stadium
Melbourne Vixens	46
Queensland Firebirds	50

Grand final
14 July – Adelaide Entertainment Centre
Adelaide Thunderbirds	50
Queensland Firebirds	48

=== Major semi-final ===
Sunday 30 June; 11:45 am	Stats	Adelaide Thunderbirds	49–39	Melbourne Vixens	Netball SA Stadium
Sunday 30 June; 11:45 am	Stats	Scoring by quarter: 12–8, 20-21, 31–30, 49–39			Netball SA Stadium
Sunday 30 June; 11:45 am	Stats	Carla Borrego 32/37 (86%); Erin Bell 17/22 (77%); Laura Packard 0/1 (0%)		Karyn Howarth 29/35 (83%); Sharelle McMahon 8/10 (80%); Tegan Caldwell 2/2 (100%)	Netball SA Stadium

=== Grand final ===
Sunday 14 July; 2:00 pm	Stats	Adelaide Thunderbirds	50–48	Queensland Firebirds	Adelaide Entertainment Centre
Sunday 14 July; 2:00 pm	Stats	Scoring by quarter: 9–13, 24–26, 40–37, 50–48			Adelaide Entertainment Centre
Sunday 14 July; 2:00 pm	Stats	Carla Borrego 26/33 (79%); Erin Bell 24/31 (77%)		Romelda Aiken 39/47 (83%); Natalie Medhurst 9/11 (82%)	Adelaide Entertainment Centre

== Award winners ==
=== ANZ Championship awards ===
Award	Winner
Grand Final MVP	Erin Bell

=== Thunderbirds awards ===
Award	Winner
Beach Energy Club Champion	Carla Borrego
Tanya Denver Medal	Renae Hallinan
Thunderbirds Players Player	Natalie von Bertouch
Stratco Fan Favourite	Natalie von Bertouch

=== All Stars ===
Position	Player
GA	Erin Bell
WD	Renae Hallinan
Coach	Jane Woodlands-Thompson

=== Australian Netball Awards ===
Award	Winner
Australian ANZ Championship Player of the Year	Erin Bell
Liz Ellis Diamond	Renae Hallinan
International Player of the Year	Renae Hallinan
Australian ANZ Championship Coach of the Year	Jane Woodlands-Thompson
