= 2013 Queensland Firebirds season =

Queensland Firebirds season

Queensland Firebirds
- 2013 season
- Head coach: Roselee Jencke
- Captain: Laura Geitz
- Main venue: Brisbane Convention and Exhibition Centre

Season results
- Wins–losses: 11–5
- Regular season: 4th
- Finals placing: 2nd
- Team colours

Queensland Firebirds seasons
- ← 2012 2014 →

The 2013 Queensland Firebirds season saw Queensland Firebirds compete in the 2013 ANZ Championship. During the regular season Firebirds finished fourth, qualifying for the playoffs. In the minor semi-final they defeated Waikato Bay of Plenty Magic 53–50 and in the preliminary final they defeated Melbourne Vixens 50–46. They were then defeated in the grand final by Adelaide Thunderbirds.

== Players ==
=== Player movements ===
Gains and losses
▲ Gains	▼ Losses
Laura Clemesha (Australian Institute of Sport); Demelza McCloud (Southern Steel); Abbey McCulloch (NNSW Waratahs); Kim Ravaillion (Australian Institute of Sport); Gabi Simpson (Australian Institute of Sport); Gretel Tippett (Queensland Fusion)	Candice Adams; Shannon Eagland (Melbourne Vixens); Elissa Macleod (Melbourne Vixens); Lauren Nourse (retirement); Amy Steel (Melbourne Vixens); Keirra Trompf (injured)

=== 2013 roster ===
2013 Queensland Firebirds roster
Players
Coaching staff

Nat.	Name	Position(s)	DoB	Height
(Jamaica)	Romelda Aiken	GS, GA	19 November 1988 (aged 24)	1.96 m (6 ft 5 in)
(Australia)	Laura Clemesha	GK, GD	21 January 1992 (aged 21)	1.90 m (6 ft 3 in)
(Australia)	Laura Geitz (c)	GK, GD	4 November 1987 (aged 25)	1.85 m (6 ft 1 in)
(Australia)	Nicola Gray	GA, WA		–
(Australia)	Demelza McCloud	GD, GK	5 August 1980 (aged 32)	1.88 m (6 ft 2 in)
(Australia)	Abbey McCulloch	WD, C, GD	12 February 1990 (aged 23)	1.78 m (5 ft 10 in)
(Australia)	Natalie Medhurst	GA, GS	20 January 1984 (aged 29)	1.78 m (5 ft 10 in)
(Australia)	Jacinta Messer	GD, GK	13 August 1986 (aged 26)	1.83 m (6 ft 0 in)
(Australia)	Chelsea Pitman	GA, WA	8 June 1988 (aged 24)	1.81 m (5 ft 11 in)
(Australia)	Kim Ravaillion	C, WD, WA	26 July 1993 (aged 19)	1.75 m (5 ft 9 in)
(Australia)	Gabi Simpson	WD, GD, C	17 October 1992 (aged 20)	1.76 m (5 ft 9 in)
(Australia)	Gretel Tippett (TRP)	GA,GS	3 July 1993 (aged 20)	1.91 m (6 ft 3 in)
(Australia)	Ameliaranne Wells	GS, GA	11 January 1991 (aged 22)	1.86 m (6 ft 1 in)

Head coach

- (Australia) Roselee Jencke

Notes

- (c) – Captain
- (cc) – Co-captain
- (vc) – Vice-captain
- – Injury / maternity leave
- (TRP) – Temporary Replacement Player

=== Debutants ===
- Abbey McCulloch, Kim Ravaillion and Gabi Simpson all made their ANZ Championship and Firebirds debuts in the Round 1 match against Southern Steel.
- Laura Clemesha made her ANZ Championship and Firebirds debuts in the Round 8 match against Canterbury Tactix.

== Melbourne Vixens Summer Challenge ==
The main pre-season event was the Summer Challenge, hosted by Melbourne Vixens at the State Netball Hockey Centre on 23 and 24 February. Queensland Firebirds were unbeaten, winning all three of their games.

Saturday 23 February	Queensland Firebirds	30–28	Southern Steel	State Netball Hockey Centre

Sunday 24 February	Queensland Firebirds	30–29	New South Wales Swifts	State Netball Hockey Centre

Sunday 24 February	Queensland Firebirds	38–30	Adelaide Thunderbirds	State Netball Hockey Centre

== Regular season ==
=== Fixtures and results ===
Round 1

Sunday 24 March	Queensland Firebirds	68 – 59	Southern Steel	Brisbane Convention and Exhibition Centre
11:10 am	Romelda Aiken 47/55 (85%); Natalie Medhurst 20/24 (83%); Ameliaranne Wells 1/1 (100%)	Report; Stats	Jodi Brown 15/21 (71%); Jhaniele Fowler 44/48 (92%)

Round 2

Monday 1 April	Central Pulse	56 – 58	Queensland Firebirds	Te Rauparaha Arena
7:40 pm	Caitlin Thwaites 35/40 (88%); Donna Wilkins 21/26 (81%)	Stats	Romelda Aiken 40/46 (87%); Natalie Medhurst 18/23 (78%)

Round 3

Sunday 7 April	Northern Mystics	51 – 72	Queensland Firebirds	Trusts Stadium
7:20 pm	Maria Tutaia 28/34 (82%); Cathrine Latu 23/23 (100%)	Stats	Romelda Aiken 56/66 (85%); Natalie Medhurst 12/12 (100%); Ameliaranne Wells 4/7 (57%)

Round 4

Monday 15 April	New South Wales Swifts	53 – 61	Queensland Firebirds	Sydney Olympic Park Sports Centre
7:40 pm	Susan Pratley 34/43 (79%); Amorette Wild 19/23 (83%)	Stats	Romelda Aiken 38/39 (97%); Natalie Medhurst 23/27 (85%)

Round 5

Queensland Firebirds received a bye.

Round 6

Sunday 28 April	Queensland Firebirds	53 – 54	Adelaide Thunderbirds	Brisbane Convention and Exhibition Centre
12:10 pm	Romelda Aiken 46/49 (94%); Natalie Medhurst 7/10 (70%)	Stats	Carla Borrego 29/32 (91%); Erin Bell 25/31 (81%)

Round 7

Sunday 5 May	Queensland Firebirds	63 – 54	West Coast Fever	Brisbane Convention and Exhibition Centre
12:10 pm	Romelda Aiken 40/44 (91%); Natalie Medhurst 22/30 (73%); Ameliaranne Wells 1/1 (100%)	Stats	Caitlin Bassett 34/39 (87%); Catherine Cox 20/24 (83%)

Round 8

Saturday 11 May	Canterbury Tactix	51 – 76	Queensland Firebirds	CBS Canterbury Arena
4:20 pm	Joanne Harten 33/36 (92%); Julianna Naoupu 13/16 (81%); Sophia Fenwick 5/9 (56%)	Stats	Romelda Aiken 46/51 (90%); Natalie Medhurst 20/21 (95%); Ameliaranne Wells 10/11 (91%)

Round 9

Sunday 19 May	Melbourne Vixens	46 – 57	Queensland Firebirds	Hisense Arena
12:10 pm	Karyn Howarth 27/31 (87%); Tegan Caldwell 15/19 (79%); Sharelle McMahon 4/8 (50%)	Stats	Romelda Aiken 36/41 (88%); Natalie Medhurst 21/26 (81%)

Round 10

Sunday 26 May	Queensland Firebirds	62 – 65	Waikato Bay of Plenty Magic	Gold Coast Convention and Exhibition Centre
2:10 pm	Romelda Aiken 42/46 (91%); Natalie Medhurst 20/25 (80%)	Report; Stats	Ellen Halpenny 34/44 (77%); Irene van Dyk 31/32 (97%)

Round 11

Sunday 2 June	Queensland Firebirds	47 – 53	Melbourne Vixens	Brisbane Convention and Exhibition Centre
2:10 pm	Romelda Aiken 34/40 (85%); Natalie Medhurst 13/17 (76%)	Report; Stats	Karyn Howarth 30/39 (77%); Sharelle McMahon 6/7 (86%)

Round 12

Sunday 9 June	West Coast Fever	47 – 72	Queensland Firebirds	Challenge Stadium
10:10 am	Caitlin Bassett 34/39 (87%); Kate Beveridge 3/4 (75%)	Report; Stats	Romelda Aiken 45/57 (79%); Natalie Medhurst 27/33 (82%)

Round 13

Sunday 16 June	Queensland Firebirds	52 – 48	New South Wales Swifts	Brisbane Convention and Exhibition Centre
12:10 pm	Romelda Aiken 37/40 (93%); Natalie Medhurst 15/17 (88%)	Stats	Susan Pratley 30/37 (81%); Carla Dziwoki 18/20 (90%)

Round 14

Sunday 23 June	Adelaide Thunderbirds	54 – 52	Queensland Firebirds	Netball SA Stadium
1:40 pm	Carla Borrego 33/35 (94%); Erin Bell 21/28 (75%)	Stats	Romelda Aiken 44/49 (90%); Natalie Medhurst 8/10 (80%)

=== Final table ===
2013 ANZ Championship ladder
Pos	Team	Pld	W	L	GF	GA	GD	G%	Pts
1	Adelaide Thunderbirds	13	12	1	688	620	+68	111.0	24
2	Melbourne Vixens	13	9	4	692	589	+103	117.5	18
3	Waikato Bay of Plenty Magic	13	9	4	749	650	+99	115.2	18
4	Queensland Firebirds	13	9	4	793	691	+102	114.8	18
5	Central Pulse	13	8	5	736	706	+30	104.2	16
6	Southern Steel	13	6	7	812	790	+22	102.8	12
7	West Coast Fever	13	5	8	715	757	−42	94.5	10
8	New South Wales Swifts	13	4	9	652	672	−20	97.0	8
9	Canterbury Tactix	13	2	11	700	882	−182	79.4	4
10	Northern Mystics	13	1	12	699	879	−180	79.5	2
Updated 7 April 2021

Qualified for Major semi-final
Qualified for Minor semi-final

- Pld = Games played
- W = Win (2 points)
- L = Loss (0 points)
- GF = Goals For
- GA = Goals Against
- GD = Goals Difference (= GF−GA)
- G% = Goal percentage (= 100 × GF/GA)

Pts = Points

== Finals ==
Semifinals
30 June – Netball SA Stadium
Adelaide Thunderbirds	49
Melbourne Vixens	39
1 July – Claudelands Arena
Waikato Bay of Plenty Magic	50
Queensland Firebirds	53

Preliminary final
7 July – Parkville Stadium
Melbourne Vixens	46
Queensland Firebirds	50

Grand final
14 July – Adelaide Entertainment Centre
Adelaide Thunderbirds	50
Queensland Firebirds	48

=== Minor semi-final ===
Sunday 30 June; 7:20 pm	Stats	Waikato Bay of Plenty Magic	50–53	Queensland Firebirds	Claudelands Arena	Sky Sport
Sunday 30 June; 7:20 pm	Stats	Scoring by quarter: 8–13, 24–25, 36–41, 50–53			Claudelands Arena	Sky Sport
Sunday 30 June; 7:20 pm	Stats	Irene van Dyk 27/28 (96%); Ellen Halpenny 23/26 (88%)		Romelda Aiken 40/46 (87%); Natalie Medhurst 13/17 (76%)	Claudelands Arena	Sky Sport

=== Preliminary final ===
Sunday 7 July; 12:15 pm	Stats	Melbourne Vixens	46–50	Queensland Firebirds	State Netball Hockey Centre
Sunday 7 July; 12:15 pm	Stats	Scoring by quarter: 13–10, 24–25, 31–39, 46–50			State Netball Hockey Centre
Sunday 7 July; 12:15 pm	Stats	Karyn Howarth 23/28 (82%); Sharelle McMahon 13/17 (76%); Tegan Caldwell 10/11 (91%)		Romelda Aiken 37/42 (88%); Natalie Medhurst 13/16 (81%)	State Netball Hockey Centre

=== Grand final ===
Sunday 14 July; 2:00 pm	Stats	Adelaide Thunderbirds	50–48	Queensland Firebirds	Adelaide Entertainment Centre
Sunday 14 July; 2:00 pm	Stats	Scoring by quarter: 9–13, 24–26, 40–37, 50–48			Adelaide Entertainment Centre
Sunday 14 July; 2:00 pm	Stats	Carla Borrego 26/33 (79%); Erin Bell 24/31 (77%)		Romelda Aiken 39/47 (83%); Natalie Medhurst 9/11 (82%)	Adelaide Entertainment Centre
