= 2012 Queensland Firebirds season =

Queensland Firebirds season

Queensland Firebirds
- 2012 season
- Head coach: Roselee Jencke
- Captain: Lauren Nourse
- Main venue: Brisbane Convention and Exhibition Centre

Season results
- Wins–losses: 7–6
- Regular season: 6th
- Finals placing: Did not qualify
- Team colours

Queensland Firebirds seasons
- ← 2011 2013 →

The 2012 Queensland Firebirds season saw Queensland Firebirds compete in the 2012 ANZ Championship. As both defending champions and winners of the Tauranga Pre-Season Tournament, Firebirds began the season as favorites. However they subsequently won just seven games and finished sixth during the regular season, failing to qualify for the play-offs. In October 2012, after three seasons as Firebirds' captain, Lauren Nourse announced her retirement.

== Players ==
=== Player movements ===
Gains and losses
▲ Gains	▼ Losses
Shannon Eagland (Victorian Fury); Nicola Gray (NNSW Waratahs); Jacinta Messer (Queensland Fusion); Stephanie Wood (Queensland Fusion)	Clare McMeniman (retirement); Jacqui Russell (Yorkshire Jets)

=== 2012 roster ===
2012 Queensland Firebirds roster
Players
Coaching staff

Nat.	Name	Position(s)	DoB	Height
(Australia)	Candice Adams	GA, GS, WA	23 November 1988 (aged 23)	1.80 m (5 ft 11 in)
(Jamaica)	Romelda Aiken	GS, GA	19 November 1988 (aged 23)	1.96 m (6 ft 5 in)
(Australia)	Shannon Eagland (TRP)	GD, WD	16 May 1990 (aged 21)	1.82 m (6 ft 0 in)
(Australia)	Laura Geitz	GK, GD	4 November 1987 (aged 24)	1.85 m (6 ft 1 in)
(Australia)	Nicola Gray (TRP)	GA, WA		–
(Australia)	Elissa Macleod	C, WD, WA	19 March 1984 (aged 28)	1.73 m (5 ft 8 in)
(Australia)	Natalie Medhurst	GA, GS	20 January 1984 (aged 28)	1.78 m (5 ft 10 in)
(Australia)	Jacinta Messer	GD, GK	13 August 1986 (aged 25)	1.83 m (6 ft 0 in)
(Australia)	Lauren Nourse (c)	WA, C	10 August 1982 (aged 29)	1.78 m (5 ft 10 in)
(Australia)	Chelsea Pitman	GA, WA	8 June 1988 (aged 23)	1.81 m (5 ft 11 in)
(Australia)	Amy Steel	GD, GK	7 April 1989 (aged 22)	1.90 m (6 ft 3 in)
(Australia)	Keirra Trompf	WD	16 September 1985 (aged 26)	1.83 m (6 ft 0 in)
(Australia)	Ameliaranne Wells	GS, GA	11 January 1991 (aged 21)	1.86 m (6 ft 1 in)
(Australia)	Stephanie Wood (TRP)	GA, WA	28 November 1991 (aged 20)	1.75 m (5 ft 9 in)

Head coach

- (Australia) Roselee Jencke

Notes

- (c) – Captain
- (cc) – Co-captain
- (vc) – Vice-captain
- – Injury / maternity leave
- (TRP) – Temporary Replacement Player

Notes

- ^1 Nicola Gray made her ANZ Championship and Firebirds debut, as a temporary replacement player for Chelsea Pitman, in the Round 5 match against Melbourne Vixens.
- ^2 Stephanie Wood was called up as a temporary replacement player. However she never made a senior appearance for Firebirds.

== Tauranga Pre-Season Tournament ==
On 2, 3 and 4 March, Waikato Bay of Plenty Magic hosted a pre-season tournament at the TECT Arena in Tauranga. For the first time since 2008, all ten ANZ Championship teams competed at the same tournament. The ten teams were divided into two pools of five. Teams within each pool played each other once and the winners qualified for the final. Queensland Firebirds won both their pool and the tournament overall after defeating Melbourne Vixens 50–30 in the final.

Final

Sunday 4 March	Queensland Firebirds	50–30	Melbourne Vixens	TECT Arena

== Regular season ==
=== Fixtures and results ===
Round 1

Sunday 1 April	Queensland Firebirds	42 – 47	Melbourne Vixens	Brisbane Convention and Exhibition Centre
14:20 (UTC+10:00)	Romelda Aiken 29/35 (83%); Natalie Medhurst 13/21 (62%)	Report; Stats	Kate Beveridge 15/19 (79%); Karyn Howarth 26/38 (68%); Tegan Caldwell 6/8 (75%)

Round 2

Sunday 8 April	Queensland Firebirds	44 – 54	Adelaide Thunderbirds	Brisbane Convention and Exhibition Centre
12:10 (UTC+10:00)	Romelda Aiken 34/43 (79%); Natalie Medhurst 10/11 (91%); Chelsea Pitman 0/1 (0%)	Stats	Erin Bell 22/29 (76%); Carla Borrego 32/35 (91%)

Round 3

Sunday 15 April	Queensland Firebirds	58 – 32	Central Pulse	Brisbane Convention and Exhibition Centre
12:10 (UTC+12:00)	Romelda Aiken 38/48 (79%); Natalie Medhurst 20/22 (91%)	Stats	Amber Bellringer 7/10 (70%); Paula Griffin 4/12 (33%); Caitlin Thwaites 21/28 (75%)

Round 4

Sunday 22 April	New South Wales Swifts	54 – 49	Queensland Firebirds	Sydney Olympic Park Sports Centre
14:20 (UTC+10:00)	Carla Dziwoki 14/17 (82%); Susan Pratley 30/34 (88%); Amorette Wild 10/12 (83%)	Stats	Romelda Aiken 30/39 (77%); Natalie Medhurst 19/22 (86%)

Round 5

Sunday 29 April	Melbourne Vixens	52 – 51	Queensland Firebirds	Hisense Arena
14:20 (UTC+10:00)	Kate Beveridge 12/16 (75%); Tegan Caldwell 27/33 (82%); Karyn Howarth 13/16 (81%)	Stats	Romelda Aiken 33/36 (92%); Natalie Medhurst 18/23 (78%)

Round 6

Sunday 6 May	Queensland Firebirds	56 – 43	Northern Mystics	Gold Coast Convention and Exhibition Centre
14:20 (UTC+10:00)	Romelda Aiken 34/47 (72%); Natalie Medhurst 22/24 (92%)	Stats	Cathrine Latu 19/19 (100%); Grace Rasmussen 0/1 (0%); Maria Tutaia 24/32 (75%)

Round 7

Monday 14 May	Queensland Firebirds	64 – 48	Canterbury Tactix	Brisbane Convention and Exhibition Centre
19:40 (UTC+10:00)	Romelda Aiken 38/43 (88%); Natalie Medhurst 26/29 (90%)	Stats	Ellen Halpenny 20/30 (67%); Joanne Harten 23/29 (79%); Anna Thompson 5/9 (56%)

Round 8

Sunday 20 May	Southern Steel	60 – 61	Queensland Firebirds	Stadium Southland
19:20 (UTC+12:00)	Jodi Brown 32/40 (80%); Donna Wilkins 28/30 (93%)	Stats	Romelda Aiken 37/42 (88%); Natalie Medhurst 24/27 (89%)

Round 9

Sunday 27 May	West Coast Fever	55 – 56	Queensland Firebirds	Challenge Stadium
10:10 (UTC+08:00)	Caitlin Bassett 34/37 (92%); Catherine Cox 21/29 (72%)	Stats	Romelda Aiken 32/34 (94%); Natalie Medhurst 24/31 (77%)

Round 10

Sunday 3 June	Queensland Firebirds	50 – 45	New South Wales Swifts	Brisbane Convention and Exhibition Centre
12:10 (UTC+10:00)	Romelda Aiken 38/43 (88%); Natalie Medhurst 12/20 (60%)	Report	Susan Pratley 29/33 (88%); Amorette Wild 9/12 (75%); Carla Dziwoki 7/9 (78%)

Round 11

Sunday 10 June	Adelaide Thunderbirds	54 – 49	Queensland Firebirds	Netball SA Stadium
13:40 (UTC+09:30)	Erin Bell 19/21 (90%); Carla Borrego 35/35 (100%)	Report	Romelda Aiken ? Natalie Medhurst ?

Round 12

Queensland Firebirds received a bye.

Round 13

Sunday 24 June	Queensland Firebirds	63 – 43	West Coast Fever	Brisbane Convention and Exhibition Centre
14:20 (UTC+10:00)	Romelda Aiken; Natalie Medhurst 38	Report	Caitlin Bassett 35; Catherine Cox

Round 14

Monday 2 July	Waikato Bay of Plenty Magic	53 – 43	Queensland Firebirds	Claudelands Arena
19:40 (UTC+12:00)		Report

=== Final table ===
2012 ANZ Championship ladder
Pos	Team	Pld	W	L	GF	GA	GD	G%	Pts
1	Melbourne Vixens	13	10	3	645	569	76	113.36	20
2	Northern Mystics	13	10	3	667	633	34	105.37	20
3	Waikato Bay of Plenty Magic	13	9	4	699	594	105	117.68	18
4	Adelaide Thunderbirds	13	9	4	670	589	81	113.75	18
5	New South Wales Swifts	13	8	5	624	638	-14	97.81	16
6	Queensland Firebirds	13	7	6	686	640	46	107.19	14
7	Central Pulse	13	5	8	585	626	-41	93.45	10
8	West Coast Fever	13	3	10	608	673	-65	90.34	6
9	Southern Steel	13	2	11	639	728	-89	87.77	4
10	Canterbury Tactix	13	2	11	634	767	-133	82.66	4
Updated 28 March 2021

Qualified for Major semi-final
Qualified for Minor semi-final

- Pld = Games played
- W = Win (2 points)
- L = Loss (0 points)
- GF = Goals For
- GA = Goals Against
- GD = Goals Difference (= GF−GA)
- G% = Goal percentage (= 100 × GF/GA)

Pts = Points
