= Melissa Rowland =

Australian netball player (born 1989)

Personal information
- Full name: Melissa Rowland
- Born: 18 May 1989 (age 37)
- Height: 186 cm (6 ft 1 in)
- School: Penleigh and Essendon Grammar School

Netball career
- Playing positions: GA, GS
| Years | Club team | Apps |
| 2007 | Melbourne Phoenix | |
| 2008–2012 | Adelaide Thunderbirds | |
| 2008–2012 | Southern Force | |
| 2008–2009 | → Contax | |
| 2009–2011 | → SASI | |
| 2010 | → Oakdale | |
| 2011 | → Woods Panthers | |
| 2014 | South Bendigo | |
| 2018 | Watsonia | |

Melissa Rowland (born 18 May 1989) is a former Australian netball player. In 2007 Rowland was included in the Melbourne Phoenix Commonwealth Bank Trophy squad. She was also a member of the Adelaide Thunderbirds senior team during the 2008 and 2012 ANZ Championship seasons. Rowland was a member of both the Contax team that won the 2008 South Australia state league title and of the Southern Force team that won the 2012 Australian Netball League.

== Playing career ==
=== Early years ===
Rowland is originally from Mildura, Victoria. In 2005, while representing Victoria at under-17 level in the Australian National Netball Championships, she was spotted by Australia netball international, Eloise Southby-Halbish. Southby-Halbish noted Rowland's height, athleticism and speed. Southby-Halbish helped Rowland gain a scholarship for her VCE years at Penleigh and Essendon Grammar School, where the former served as a netball coach. While attending PEGS, Rowland also boarded at the Keilor home of Southby-Halbish's parents, Geoff Southby and his wife Lorraine. In 2007 Rowland was included in the Melbourne Phoenix Commonwealth Bank Trophy squad.

=== Australian National Netball Championships ===
Rowland represented both Victoria and South Australia at the Australian National Netball Championships. In 2005 she played for Victoria in the under-17 tournament. In 2010 she was a member of the South Australia team that were runners up in the under-21 tournament.

=== Adelaide Thunderbirds ===
Between 2008 and 2012, Rowland was a squad member and/or training partner with Adelaide Thunderbirds in the ANZ Championship. In 2008 she a member of the inaugural Thunderbirds squad. During the 2009, 2010 and 2011 seasons she served as a Thunderbirds training partner. She was recalled to the senior Thunderbirds team for the 2012 season.

=== Southern Force ===
Between 2008 and 2012, Rowland played for Southern Force in the Australian Netball League. In 2012, along with Kelly Altmann, Georgia Beaton, Cody Lange, Maddy Proud, Kate Shimmin and Sheree Wingard, she was a member of the Southern Force team that finished as ANL Champions.

=== South Australia state league ===
Between 2008 and 2012, Rowland played for several teams in the South Australia state league, including Contax, the South Australian Sports Institute, Oakdale and Woods Panthers. In 2008, together with Bianca Reddy and Kirby Mutton, she was a member of the Contax team that were state league champions. Between 2009 and 2011 she was a SASI scholarship holder. In both 2010 and 2011, while playing for Oakdale and Woods Panthers respectively, she was named in the leagues team of the year.

=== Victoria leagues ===
In 2014 Rowland played for South Bendigo in the Bendigo Football Netball League and in 2018 she played for Watsonia in the Northern Football Netball League.

== Honours ==
Adelaide Thunderbirds

- ANZ Championship
  - Winners: 2010
  - Runners Up: 2009

Southern Force

- Australian Netball League
  - Winners: 2012: 1

Contax

- South Australia state league
  - Winners: 2008

South Australia

- Australian National Netball Championships
  - Runners Up: 2010
