= Laura von Bertouch =

Australia netball player (born 1980)

Personal information
- Full name: Laura Gallagher (Née: von Bertouch)
- Born: 4 December 1980 (age 45) Adelaide, South Australia
- Occupation: Occupational therapist
- Height: 1.67 m (5 ft 5 1/2 in)
- Spouse: James Gallagher
- Relative: Natalie von Bertouch (sister)
- School: Immanuel College

Netball career
- Playing positions: C, WA
Years	Club team	Apps
199x–20xx	Contax	
1998–2009	Adelaide Thunderbirds	
Years	National team	Caps
2006–2007	Australia	18
Medal record
Representing Australia
World Netball Championships
Gold medal – first place	2007 Auckland	Team

Laura von Bertouch (/ˈbɜːrtoʊ/ BUR-toh; born 4 December 1980) is a former Australia netball international. Bertouch was a member of the Australia team that won the gold medal at the 2007 World Netball Championships. At club level, Bertouch played for Adelaide Thunderbirds, mainly during the Commonwealth Bank Trophy era. She captained Thunderbirds between 2004 and 2007. Her younger sister, Natalie von Bertouch, is also a former netball player. The two sisters were team mates with both Thunderbirds and Australia.

== Early life, family and education ==
Von Bertouch is the daughter of Terry von Bertouch, who during the late 1960s and 1970s played Australian rules football for North Adelaide and Norwood in the South Australian National Football League. Her younger sister, Natalie von Bertouch, is also a former Australia netball international. The Bertouch sisters were both educated at Immanuel College. Bertouch is married to the Australian rules footballer, James Gallagher.

== Playing career ==
=== Contax ===
Bertouch and her sister, Natalie von Bertouch, began playing netball aged seven and nine at the Contax Netball Club. In 2000, together with Tracey Neville, the Bertouch sisters were members of the Contax team that won the South Australia Farmers Union League.

=== Adelaide Thunderbirds ===
In 1998, Bertouch began playing for Adelaide Thunderbirds. Together with Kathryn Harby-Williams, Jacqui Delaney, Peta Squire and Alex Hodge, she was a member of the Thunderbirds squad that won two Commonwealth Bank Trophy premierships in 1998 and 1999. In 2002 she became a regular member of the Thunderbirds starting seven, playing at wing attack, and forming a strong mid-court combination with her sister, Natalie von Bertouch. She was subsequently named in the Team of the Year for the 2002, 2004, 2005, 2006 and 2007 seasons. She also captained Thunderbirds between 2004 and 2007. In November 2007 Bertouch announced she was retiring as a netball player. However, she returned to play for Thunderbirds in the 2009 ANZ Championship season.

=== Australia ===
Between 2006 and 2007 Bertouch made 18 senior appearances for Australia. She was first included in senior Australia squads in 2002 but a knee injury delayed her making a senior appearance until 2006. She eventually made her senior debut on 22 July 2006 against New Zealand. Along with her sister, Natalie von Bertouch, Bertouch was subsequently a member of the Australia team that won the gold medal at the 2007 World Netball Championships.

Tournaments	Place
2007 World Netball Championships	1st place, gold medalist(s)

== Honours ==
Australia

- World Netball Championships
  - Winners: 2007

Adelaide Thunderbirds

- Commonwealth Bank Trophy
  - Winners: 1998, 1999
  - Runners Up: 1997, 2000, 2001, 2002, 2006
- ANZ Championship
  - Runners Up: 2009

Contax

- South Australia Farmers Union League
  - Winners: 2000
