= Contax Netball Club =

Netball team in South Australia

- Founded: 1952
- Based in: Adelaide
- Regions: South Australia
- Home venue: Netball SA Stadium
- Head coach: Leanne Eichler
- Captain: Georgia Beaton
- Premierships: 20
- League: Netball South Australia Premier League; Esso/Mobil Superleague
- Website: www.contax.net.au
Uniform
Uniform

Contax Netball Club are an Australian netball team based in Adelaide, South Australia. Their senior team currently plays in the Netball South Australia Premier League. Between 1989 and 1996, Contax represented Netball South Australia in the Esso/Mobil Superleague. They were premiers in 1994. They were originally known as Contax Basketball Club, when netball was known as women's basketball. During the Esso/Mobil Superleague era, they were also referred to as Adelaide Contax. Between 1995 and 2012, when the club was sponsored by ETSA, and then ETSA Utilities, they were known as ETSA Contax.

== History ==
=== Early years ===
Contax Basketball Club was formed in 1952 by a group of young girls who had played for the 1951 junior South Australia team. The team was originally based in Woodville. The team was named after the Contax camera. It was suggested by the brother-in-law of the inaugural captain, Margaret Rankin. He was a camera enthusiast and suggested using a short and simple name. Contax won their first South Australia state league premiership in their debut season, defeating Tango in the 1952 grand final. The team was captained by Rankin and included three future Australia internationals – Gaynor Flanagan, Betty Rowe Whelan and Lorraine Wright. Contax initially only organized adult teams. However, from 1966 the club started to introduce junior and youth teams with training taking place in Hectorville. In 1970 Contax won their second premiership, defeating Garville in the grand final. In 1980 Margaret Angove was appointed head coach of the senior Contax team. She remained in the position for sixteen years until 1997, when she was appointed head coach of Adelaide Thunderbirds. In 1986, with a team that included sixteen year old Kathryn Harby and Michelle den Dekker, Contax won their third premiership, defeating Tango in the grand final.

=== Rivallry with Garville ===
In 1988, with a team that included Michelle den Dekker and Kathryn Harby, Contax won their fourth premiership, defeating Garville in the grand final. This marked the beginning a rivalry between Contax and Garville. Between 1986 and 1996 Contax and Garville contested every South Australia state league grand final. The rivalry saw the two clubs compete in nine consecutive state league grand finals, plus one Mobil Super League final, with both clubs winning five finals each. With a team that included Harby and Julie Nykiel, a former Australia women's basketball international, Contax won their fifth and sixth premierships in 1990 and 1991. After finishing as runners-up to Garville for four successive grand finals, a Contax team featuring Jacqui Delaney won the club's seventh premiership in 1996.

=== National leagues ===
Esso/Mobil Superleague

Between 1989 and 1996 Contax represented Netball South Australia in the Esso/Mobil Superleague. With teams that included Kathryn Harby, Michelle Fielke and Julie Nykiel, Contax played in three successive grand finals between 1990 and 1992. In 1990 they lost to 52–42 to Melbourne City. Contax then lost out to Sydney Pulsars in both 1991 and 1992. In 1994 Contax won the title after defeating Garville in controversial circumstances. A Contax team captained by Kathryn Harby and featuring Vicki Wilson and Tania Obst, took on a Garville team featuring Natalie Avellino, Jenny Borlase and Fielke. Wilson was the top scorer and the closely fought match finish level at full time. However Garville claimed they had actually won the match 48–46. It was alleged that during the third quarter, the official scorer accidentally gave one of Garville's goals to Contax. Despite protests from Garville, extra time was played and resulted in a 61–58 win for Contax.

Commonwealth Bank Trophy

In 1997 Netball Australia replaced the Mobil Superleague with the Commonwealth Bank Trophy league. Contax applied to join the new league but the application was subsequently denied by Netball South Australia. They instead opted to form two brand new teams, Adelaide Thunderbirds and Adelaide Ravens. Together with Cheerio, Matrics and Oakdale, Contax effectively became a feeder team for Thunderbirds. With a squad coached by former Contax head coach, Margaret Angove, captained by Contax player Kathryn Harby and featuring several Contax players including Jacqui Delaney and Laura von Bertouch, Adelaide Thunderbirds won their first two premierships and grand finals in 1998 and 1999.

=== ETSA Contax ===
Between 1995 and 2012 when Contax were sponsored by ETSA, and then ETSA Utilities, the team became known as ETSA Contax. In 2000 with a squad that included Laura and Natalie von Bertouch, Bianca Reddy and Tracey Neville, Contax won their eighth South Australia state league after defeating the Australian Institute of Sport in the grand final. Between 2002 and 2004 Contax won three successive state league premierships. Natalie von Bertouch, Kirby Mutton, Carla Dziwoki and Lauren Nourse were all members of the 2002 winning squad. ETSA Contax subsequently won further premierships in 2006, 2008, 2010 and 2012.

=== Premier League era ===
During the 2010s Contax won a further six premierships. During the 2010s their main rivals were Matrics. Between them Contax and Matrics played in every South Australia state league grand final during the decade.

== Grand finals ==
South Australia state league

Season	Winners	Score	Runners up	Venue
1952	Contax		Tango	
1970	Contax		Garville	
1973			Contax	
1984	Tango		Contax	
1986	Contax		Tango	
1988	Contax		Garville	Apollo Stadium
1989	Garville		Contax	
1990	Contax		Garville	Apollo Stadium
1991	Contax		Garville	
1992	Garville		Contax	
1993	Garville		Contax	
1994	Garville		Contax	
1995	Garville		Contax	
1996	Contax		Garville	
1997	Matrics		Contax	
1999			Contax	
2000	Contax		Australian Institute of Sport	
2002	Contax			
2003	Contax			
2004	Contax			
2005	Matrics		Contax	
2006	Contax			
2007			Contax	
2008	Contax			
2009	Oakdale		Contax	
2010	Contax		Matrics	
2012	Contax		Phoenix	
2013	Contax	34–33	Matrics	Netball SA Stadium
2015	Contax	51–39	Matrics	Netball SA Stadium
2016	Matrics	49–47	Contax	Netball SA Stadium
2017	Contax	59–50	Matrics	Netball SA Stadium
2018	Contax	73–39	Garville	
2019	Matrics	55–47	Contax	Priceline Stadium
2020	Matrics	60–56	Contax	Priceline Stadium

Esso/Mobil Superleague

Season	Winners	Score	Runners up	Venue
1990	Melbourne City	52–42	Adelaide Contax	State Sports Centre
1991	Sydney Pulsars	59–36	Adelaide Contax	Bruce Stadium
1992	Sydney Pulsars	59–45	Adelaide Contax	State Sports Centre
1994	Adelaide Contax	61–58	Adelaide Garville	Adelaide Powerhouse

== Home venue ==
Contax play the majority of their state league home games at the Netball SA Stadium.

== Notable players ==
=== Internationals ===
Australia

- Jane Altschwager
- Laura von Bertouch
- Natalie von Bertouch
- Audine Cobb
- Jacqui Delaney
- Michelle den Dekker
- Gaynor Flanagan
- Kristen Heinrich
- Kathryn Harby
- Kay Jessen
- Lauren Nourse
- Shelley O'Donnell
- Margaret Rankine
- Betty Rowe Whelan
- Rebecca Sanders
- Sarah Sutter
- Vicki Wilson
- Lorraine Wright

Australia Fast5

- Emily Beaton
- Carla Dziwoki
- Maddy Proud
- Kate Shimmin
- Maddy Turner

England

- Tracey Neville
- Kate Shimmin

Australia women's basketball

- Julie Nykiel

=== Adelaide Thunderbirds ===
- Jane Altschwager
- Laura von Bertouch
- Natalie von Bertouch
- Jacqui Delaney
- Emily Beaton
- Georgia Beaton
- Sasha Glasgow
- Kristen Heinrich
- Kathryn Harby
- Kirby Mutton
- Tracey Neville
- Maddy Proud
- Bianca Reddy
- Melissa Rowland
- Kate Shimmin
- Georgie Horjus

=== State / Premier League Best & Fairest ===
Season	Players
1974, 1975	Kay Smerdon
1977	S. Lehmann
1979	Kerry Hussey
1983	Ros Natt
1985	Rhonda Kraft
1986	Michelle den Dekker
1987	Wendy Frost
1988	Kathryn Harby/Karen Schulz
1989	Karen Schulz
1990	Sarah Angove
1991, 1992, 1993, 1996	Kathryn Harby
1995	Rebecca Sanders
1997	Vicki Neale
1998	Leanne Oats
1999	Laura von Bertouch
2000	Natalie von Bertouch
2001	Leeanne Oats/Laura von Bertouch
2002	Leanne Oats
2004	Rebecca Sanders
2005	Amanda Martin
2006, 2007	Leanne Eichler
2008, 2009, 2012	Jane Fitzgerald
2010	Kirby Mutton
2011	Kristen Heinrich
2013, 2014, 2015, 2017	Georgia Beaton
2016	Gia Abernethy
2018	Georgie Horjus
2019	Amehlia Schmidt
2020	Chelsea Lemke

=== Club Captains ===
Season	Player
1952–1954	Margaret Rankine
1955–1958	Gaynor Flanagan
1959–1962	Jenny Badman
1963–1967	Moira Clarke
1968	Margaret Edwards
1969	Rosemary Cobby
1970	Gerry Freer
1971	Margaret Van der Linden
1973	Gerry Freer
1974–1976	Kay Smerdon
1978	Lyn Mulroney
1980	Jill Dolan
1981–1982	Ros Natt
1983–1984	Kay Jessen
1985–1987	Rhonda Kraft
1988–1992	Karen Schulz
1993–1996	Kathryn Harby
1997–1998	Tania Obst
1999	Vicki Neale
2000–2007	Leanne Oats Eichler
2008–2013	Jane Fitzgerald
2014	Lauren Hyde
2015–2018	Gia Abernethy
2015–	Georgia Beaton

== Head coaches ==
Coach	Years
Lena Pomeroy	1952–1955
Fay Dumont	1958
Mavis Buckingham	1961
Merle Oldham	1962–1963
Joan Horner	1964–1972
Pauline Fielden	1973–1976
Daphne Axford	1977
Jenny Bonnett	1978–1979
Margaret Angove	1980–1996
Barney Williams	1997–2000
Tania Obst	2001–2006
Fay Walsh	2007
Tania Obst	2008–2009
Margaret Angove	2010–2011
Leanne Eichler	2012–

== Main sponsors ==
	Years
Class A Jewellers	1990–1993
Fairmont Homes	1994
ETSA	1995–1999
ETSA Utilities	1999–2012
SA Power Networks	2012–

== Premierships ==
- Netball South Australia Premier League
  - Winners: 1952, 1970, 1986, 1988, 1990, 1991, 1996, 2000, 2002, 2003, 2004, 2006, 2008, 2010, 2012, 2013, 2015, 2017, 2018: 19
  - Runners up: 1973, 1984, 1989, 1992, 1993, 1994, 1995, 1997, 1999, 2005, 2007, 2009, 2016, 2019, 2020 : 15
- Mobil Superleague
  - Winners: 1994
  - Runners up: 1990, 1991, 1992
