= Lauren Nourse =

Australia netball international

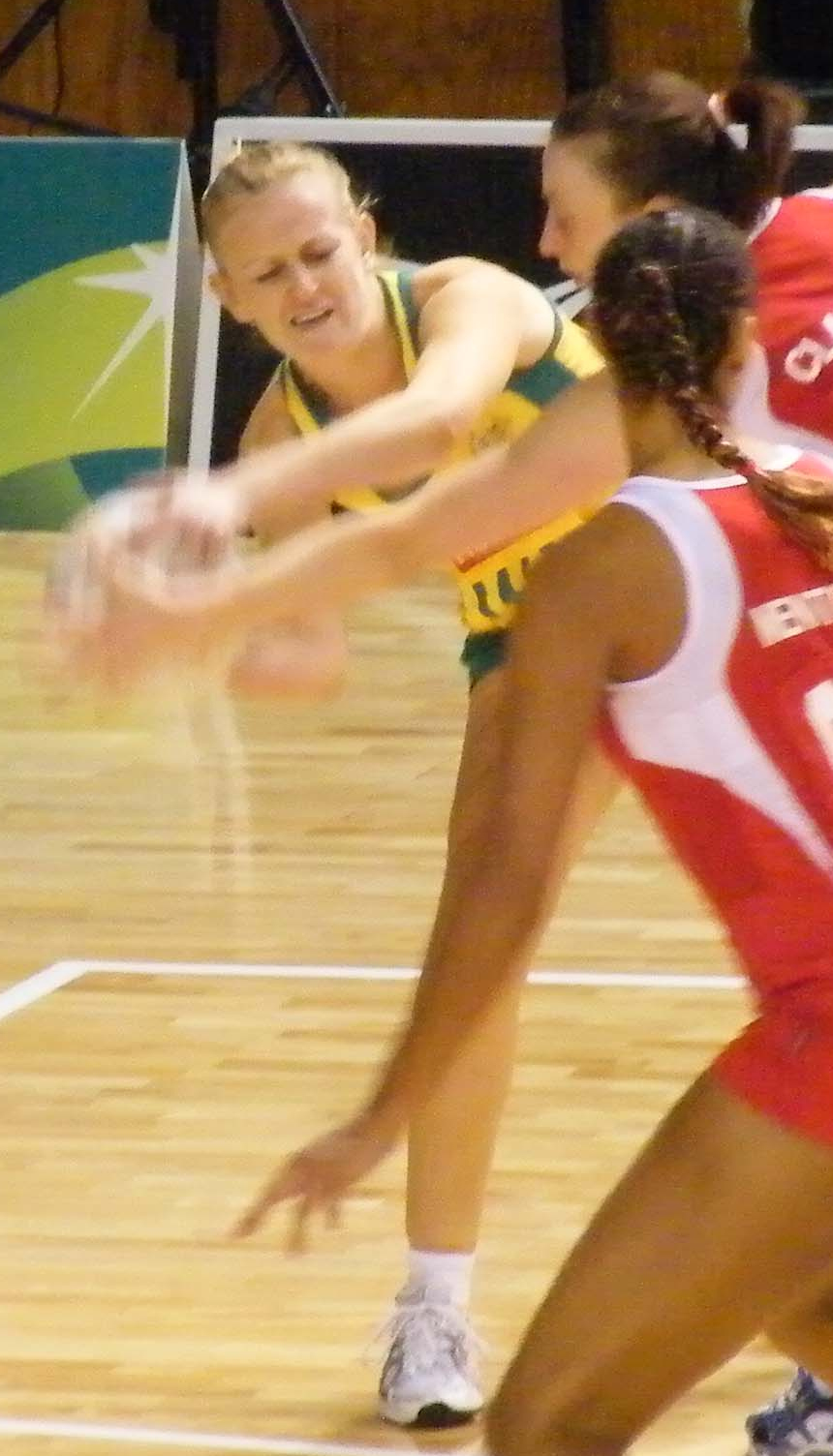
- 8 October 2008; Nourse (left) playing for Australia against England.

Personal information
- Born: 10 August 1982 (age 44) Loxton, South Australia
- Height: 1.78 m (5 ft 10 in)
- School: Immanuel College

Netball career
- Playing positions: WA, C
Years	Club team	Apps
199x–2003	Contax	
2003	AIS Canberra Darters	
2004–2012	Queensland Firebirds	
Years	National team	Caps
2007–2011	Australia	25
Coaching career
- Years: Team
- 2014–: Matthew Flinders Anglican College
Medal record
Representing Australia
World Netball Championships
Gold medal – first place	2007 Auckland	Team
Commonwealth Games
Silver medal – second place	2010 Delhi	Team
World Netball Series
Bronze medal – third place	2009 Manchester	Team

Lauren Nourse (born 10 August 1982) is an Australian former international netballer. Between 2007 and 2011, she made 25 senior appearances for Australia. Nourse was a member of the Australia teams that won the gold medal at the 2007 World Netball Championships and the silver medal at the 2010 Commonwealth Games. Between 2004 and 2012, Nourse played for Queensland Firebirds. In 2011, she captained Firebirds when they won the 2011 ANZ Championship.

== Early life and education ==
Nourse is originally from South Australia. She was born in Loxton and grew up in Port Lincoln where she attended St Joseph's School and played netball for Saint Mary's. She later attended Immanuel College, Adelaide.

== Playing career ==
=== South Australia ===
Between 1998 and 2003, Nourse represented South Australia in the Australian National Netball Championships at under-17, under-19, under-21 and Open levels.

=== Contax ===
Nourse also played for Contax in the South Australia state league. In 2002, together with Natalie von Bertouch, Carla Dziwoki and Kirby Mutton, she was a member of the Contax team that won the state league title.

=== AIS Canberra Darters ===
In 2003, Nourse played for AIS Canberra Darters in the Commonwealth Bank Trophy league under coach Norma Plummer.

=== Queensland Firebirds ===
Between 2004 and 2012, Nourse played for Queensland Firebirds, initially in the Commonwealth Bank Trophy league and later in the ANZ Championship. Between 2010 and 2012, she served as Firebirds' team captain. In 2011 she captained Firebirds when they won the 2011 ANZ Championship. She captained Firebirds to ten successive wins, helping them secure the minor premiership and a place in the play-offs. However on 10 April, in a Round 9 match against Central Pulse, Nourse suffered an anterior cruciate ligament injury which ended her season. After making a comeback during the 2012 season, she announced her retirement in October 2012.

=== Australia ===
Between 2007 and 2011, Nourse made 25 senior appearances for Australia. She previously represented Australia at under-21 level. She made her senior debut for Australia on 21 July 2007 against New Zealand. Nourse was called into the senior team as an injury replacement for Mo'onia Gerrard after impressing national selectors during an unofficial practice match against England. She became the first Queensland Firebirds player since Vicki Wilson to represent Australia. Coincidentally, in 2007 Wilson was Nourse's head coach at Firebirds. Nourse was subsequently a member of the Australia teams that won the gold medal at the 2007 World Netball Championships and the silver medal at the 2010 Commonwealth Games. She was expected to represent Australia at the 2011 World Netball Championships, however she was ruled out after suffering an ACL injury while playing for Firebirds.

Tournaments	Place
2007 World Netball Championships	1st place, gold medalist(s)
2009 World Netball Series	3rd place, bronze medalist(s)
2010 Commonwealth Games	2nd place, silver medalist(s)

== Teaching career ==
Nourse works as teacher and netball coach. Since 2014, she has served as a director of netball at Matthew Flinders Anglican College. In 2016 and 2017 she guided the netball team to two successive Vicki Wilson Cup wins. The Vicki Wilson Cup is Netball Queensland's top level school competition. She previously worked as a teacher at St Peters Lutheran College.

== Honours ==
Australia

- World Netball Championships
  - Winners: 2007
- Commonwealth Games
  - Runners Up: 2010

Queensland Firebirds

- ANZ Championship
  - Winners: 2011

Contax

- South Australia state league
  - Winners: 2002
