= Von Bertouch =

von Bertouch is a surname. Notable people with the surname include:

- Anne Von Bertouch (1915–2003), Australian artist and writer
- Georg von Bertouch (1668–1743), German-born Norwegian Baroque composer
- Laura von Bertouch (born 1980), Australian netball player
- Nadia von Bertouch (born 1995), Australian rules football player
- Natalie von Bertouch (born 1982), Australian netball player
