= Jacqui Delaney =

Australia netball international

Personal information
- Full name: Jacqui Delaney
- Born: c. 1975 (age 50–51) South Australia
- Spouse: Roger Delaney

Netball career
- Playing positions: GA, WA
Years	Club team	Apps
1996	Contax	
1997–2003	Adelaide Thunderbirds	95
Years	National team	Caps
1997–2002	Australia	21
Coaching career
- Years: Team
- 2004–2005: Fairfield City-Sydney University Lions
- 201x–: GSLC Netball Academy
Medal record
Representing Australia
World Netball Championships
Gold medal – first place	1999 Christchurch	Team
Commonwealth Games
Gold medal – first place	2002 Manchester	Team
World Youth Netball Championships
Gold medal – first place	1996 Toronto	Team

Jacqui Delaney is a former Australia netball international. Between 1997 and 2002 she made 21 senior appearances for Australia. Delaney was a member of the Australia teams that won the gold medals at the 1999 World Netball Championships and the 2002 Commonwealth Games. At club level, Delaney played for Contax in both the South Australia state league and the Mobil Superleague and for Adelaide Thunderbirds in the Commonwealth Bank Trophy league. She was a member of the Thunderbirds squad won two premierships and grand finals in 1998 and 1999.

== Early life and family ==
Delaney is originally from South Australia and grew up in the Murray River towns of Berri and Murray Bridge. In her youth, she played basketball before switching to netball at 15. She is married to Roger Delaney, the former Australian rules footballer. They have three children, Yasmine (b. 1998) and twins, Cooper and Jada (born c.2006). The Delaneys settled in Sydney and then the Sunshine Coast. They live and work in the Coolum Beach/Peregian Beach/Noosa district.

== Playing career ==
=== Contax ===
Delaney played for Contax in both the South Australia state league and the Mobil Superleague. In 1996 she was a member of the Contax team that won the state league premiership.

=== Adelaide Thunderbirds ===
Between 1997 and 2003, Delaney made 95 senior appearances for Adelaide Thunderbirds in the Commonwealth Bank Trophy league. Together with Kathryn Harby-Williams, Peta Squire and Alex Hodge, she was a member of the Thunderbirds squad won two premierships and grand finals in 1998 and 1999. In the 1999 grand final against Adelaide Ravens, she was named the Player of the Match after scoring 38 goals with an 85% accuracy rate. She was also named the Commonwealth Bank Trophy MVP in both 1999 and 2001. During her playing career, Delaney made headlines for being "unintentionally controversial". During 1997 she continued to play while pregnant. In 2003 she successfully challenged Netball Australia's residential requirement and continued to play for Thunderbirds even after she and her family relocated to Sydney for work reasons.

=== Australia ===
Between 1997 and 2002, Delaney made 21 senior appearances for Australia. She was a member of the Australia team that won the 1996 World Youth Netball Championships. She made her senior debut for Australia on 6 June 1997. She was subsequently a member of the Australia teams that won the gold medals at the 1999 World Netball Championships and the 2002 Commonwealth Games.

Tournaments	Place
1996 World Youth Netball Championships	1st place, gold medalist(s)
1999 World Netball Championships	1st place, gold medalist(s)
2002 Commonwealth Games	1st place, gold medalist(s)

== Coach ==
In 2004 Delaney was appointed head coach of the Fairfield City-Sydney University Lions team in the New South Wales State League. She later became the head netball coach at Good Shepherd Lutheran College.

== Honours ==
Australia

- World Netball Championships
  - Winners: 1999
- Commonwealth Games
  - Winners: 2002

Adelaide Thunderbirds

- Commonwealth Bank Trophy
  - Winners: 1998, 1999
  - Runners Up: 1997

Contax

- South Australia State League
  - Winners: 1996
