= Kierra =

Kierra (kee-er-rah) is a female given name. The name may be a variant of the Irish name Kiara meaning "dark" or a variant of the Greek name Kira meaning "lord". US usage of the name reached a peak in 1995.

Notable people with the name include:

- Kierra Sheard, American gospel recording artist
- Kierra Smith, Canadian swimmer

== See also ==
- Keirra Trompf, Australian netball player
