= Kirby Mutton =

Australian netball player (born 1984)

Personal information
- Full name: Kirby Morley (Née: Mutton)
- Born: 17 September 1984 (age 41)
- Height: 1.72 m (5 ft 8 in)

Netball career
- Playing positions: C, WA, WD
Years	Club team	Apps
1996–2012	Contax	276
2003–2004	→ AIS Canberra Darters	
2005–2009	→ Adelaide Thunderbirds	
Medal record
Representing Australia
World Youth Netball Championships
Bronze medal – third place	2005 Fort Lauderdale	Team

Kirby Mutton (born 17 September 1984), also known as Kirby Morley, is a former Australian netball player. Mutton played for both AIS Canberra Darters and Adelaide Thunderbirds during the Commonwealth Bank Trophy era. Mutton also played for Contax in the South Australia state league and was a member of five premiership winning teams. Between 2003 and 2005, she represented Australia at under-21 level.

== Playing career ==
=== Contax ===
Between 1996 and 2012, Mutton played for Contax. She was a member of Contax teams that won South Australia state league titles in 2002, 2006, 2008, 2010 and 2012. Her 2002 teammates at Contax included Natalie von Bertouch, Carla Dziwoki and Lauren Nourse. In 2006 she received the club's 10 Year Service Award. In 2010 she received the state league's best and fairest award. In both 2010 and 2011 she was included in the state league's team of the year. In later seasons her teammates included Kristen Hughes and Bianca Reddy. When she retired as a netball player in 2012, Mutton had played 276 senior matches for Contax.

=== AIS Canberra Darters ===
Between 2003 and 2004, Mutton played for AIS Canberra Darters in the Commonwealth Bank Trophy league.

=== Adelaide Thunderbirds ===
Between 2005 and 2007, Mutton played for Adelaide Thunderbirds in the Commonwealth Bank Trophy league. She played for Thunderbirds in the 2006 grand final, which they lost to 65–36 to Sydney Swifts. She was included in the Thunderbirds squad for the 2008 ANZ Championship season. In 2009, she was included in the Thunderbirds extended squad.

=== Australia ===
Between 2003 and 2005, Mutton represented Australia at under-21 level. She was a member of the Australia team that won a bronze medal at the 2005 World Youth Netball Championships and was named the Australian Player of the Series.

== Honours ==
Contax

- South Australia state league
  - Winners: 2002, 2006, 2008, 2010, 2012

Individual Awards

Year	Award
2005	World Youth Netball Championships Australian Player of the Series
2006	Contax 10 Year Service Award
2010	Subway Cup Best & Fairest
2010	Subway Cup Team of the Year
2011	Subway Cup Team of the Year
