= Peta Scholz =

Australia netball international

Personal information
- Full name: Peta Scholz (Née: Squire)
- Born: 17 January 1976 (age 50) South Australia
- Height: 1.80 m (5 ft 11 in)
- School: Reynella East College

Netball career
- Playing positions: WD, C, GD
Years	Club team	Apps
1980s–2009	Oakdale	
1994	→ AIS	
199x	→ Garville	
1997–2007	Adelaide Thunderbirds	169
2009–2011	Waikato Bay of Plenty Magic	
Years	National team	Caps
1998–2004	Australia	54
2009	World 7	
Coaching career
- Years: Team
- 2012: Scotch College
Medal record
Representing Australia
World Netball Championships
Gold medal – first place	1999 Christchurch	Team
Silver medal – second place	2003 Kingston	Team
Commonwealth Games
Gold medal – first place	2002 Manchester	Team
World Youth Netball Championships
Gold medal – first place	1996 Toronto	Team

Peta Scholz (born 17 January 1976), also known as Peta Squire, is a former Australia netball international. She was a member of the Australia teams that won the gold medals at the 1999 World Netball Championships and the 2002 Commonwealth Games and the silver medal at the 2003 World Netball Championships. Between 1997 and 2007, Scholz made 169 appearances for Adelaide Thunderbirds in the Commonwealth Bank Trophy league. She was a prominent member of the Thunderbirds teams that won five successive minor premierships between 1997 and 2001. She also played in six successive grand finals between 1997 and 2002, helping Thunderbirds win premierships in 1998 and 1999. In 2010 and 2011, Scholz played for Waikato Bay of Plenty Magic in the ANZ Championship.

== Early life and family ==
Squire graduated from Reynella East College in 1992. She was married to David Scholz, a teacher and cricket coach. After divorcing, she entered a relationship with a woman. They have two daughters, Matilda (born c. 2005) and Poppy (born c. 2007).

== Playing career ==
=== Oakdale ===
Squire began her netball career with Oakdale. After retiring as an Adelaide Thunderbirds player she returned to Oakdale, as Peta Scholz, and played for them in the South Australia state league. In 2009 she helped Oakdake win their first state league title.

=== Mobil Superleague ===
During the Mobil Superleague era, Squire played for both the Australian Institute of Sport and Garville. While playing for the AIS in 1994 she switched from goal defence to wing defence. This would become her regular position throughout her career.

=== Adelaide Thunderbirds ===
Between 1997 and 2007, Scholz made 169 appearances for Adelaide Thunderbirds in the Commonwealth Bank Trophy league. She was a prominent member of the Thunderbirds teams that won five successive minor premierships between 1997 and 2001. She also played in six successive grand finals between 1997 and 2002, helping Thunderbirds win premierships in 1998 and 1999. In 2002, 2003, 2004 and 2007, she was named in the Margaret Pewtress Team of the Year. Between 2004 and 2006, together with Laura von Bertouch, she co-captained Thundersbirds. In 2006 she played in her 150th Commonwealth Bank Trophy match. She retired as a Thundersbirds player after the 2007 season. Her 169 appearances (649 quarters) was the second highest tally in the Commonwealth Bank Trophy league after Liz Ellis.

=== Waikato Bay of Plenty Magic ===
In 2010 and 2011, Scholz played for Waikato Bay of Plenty Magic in the ANZ Championship. She signed for Magic in October 2009 after impressing while playing for a World 7 team in the 2009 Taini Jamison Trophy Series against New Zealand. On 8 May 2010, during a Round 8 match against Central Pulse, Scholz suffered a season ending injury. She was subsequently replaced in the squad by Jade Clarke. She returned to play for Magic during the 2011 season.

=== International ===
Australia

Between 1998 and 2004, Scholz made 54 senior appearances for Australia. She was a member of the Australia team that won the 1996 World Youth Netball Championships. She made her senior debut for Australia on 27 February 1998 against New Zealand. She was subsequently a member of the Australia teams that won the gold medals at the 1999 World Netball Championships and the 2002 Commonwealth Games and the silver medal at the 2003 World Netball Championships.

Tournaments	Place
1996 World Youth Netball Championships	1st place, gold medalist(s)
1999 World Netball Championships	1st place, gold medalist(s)
2002 Commonwealth Games	1st place, gold medalist(s)
2003 World Netball Championships	2nd place, silver medalist(s)

World 7

In August 2009, Scholz played for a World 7 team, coached by Julie Fitzgerald, that defeated New Zealand 2–1 in the 2009 Taini Jamison Trophy Series.

== Coach ==
In 2012, Scholz was appointed director of netball at Scotch College.

== Honours ==
Australia

- World Netball Championships
  - Winners: 1999
  - Runners Up: 2003
- Commonwealth Games
  - Winners: 2002

World 7

- Taini Jamison Trophy
  - Winners: 2009

Adelaide Thunderbirds

- Commonwealth Bank Trophy
  - Winners: 1998, 1999
  - Runners Up: 1997, 2000, 2001, 2002, 2006
  - Minor premierships: 1997, 1998, 1999, 2000, 2001

Oakdale

- South Australia State League
  - Winners: 2009
