= Garville Netball Club =

Netball team in South Australia

- Founded: 1952
- Based in: Woodville, Adelaide
- Regions: South Australia
- Home venue: Netball SA Stadium
- Head coach: Kirsty Leonard Down
- Premierships: 15 ?
- League: Netball South Australia Premier League; Mobil Superleague
- Website: www.garville.com.au
Uniform

Garville Netball Club is an Australian netball team based in Woodville, Adelaide, South Australia. Their senior team currently plays in the Netball South Australia Premier League. During the 1990s they played at a national level, representing Netball South Australia in the Mobil Superleague. During the Mobil Superleague era, they were also referred to as Adelaide Garville. In 1993 they were Mobil Superleague premiers.

== History ==
=== Early years ===
Garville Netball Club was formed in 1952. Its name is derived from Woodville Gardens, the Adelaide suburb where the club was originally based. Between 1962 and 1967, Garville won six successive South Australia state league premierships.

=== Rivallry with Contax ===
During the 1980s and 1990s, Garville enjoyed a rivalry with Contax. Between 1986 and 1996 Contax and Garville contested every South Australia state league grand final. The rivalry saw the two clubs compete in nine consecutive state league grand finals, plus one Mobil Superleague final, with both clubs winning five finals each. Between 1992 and 1995 Garville won four successive state league grand finals.

=== National leagues ===
Mobil Superleague

During the 1990s Garville represented Netball South Australia in the Mobil Superleague, the winners of which were awarded the Prime Minister's Cup. Garville were grand finalists in both 1993 and 1994. In the 1993 grand final a Garville team featuring Natalie Avellino, Jenny Borlase and Michelle den Dekker defeated Sydney Electricity and finished as champions. However, in 1994 Garville lost the Prime Minister's Cup after they were defeated by Contax in controversial circumstances. A Contax team captained by Kathryn Harby and featuring Vicki Wilson and Tania Obst, took on a Garville team that again featured Avellino, Borlase and Dekker and now included Simone McKinnis. A closely fought match finished level at full time. However Garville claimed they had actually won the match 48–46. It was alleged that during the third quarter, the official scorer accidentally gave one of Garville's goals to Contax. Despite protests from Garville, extra time was played and resulted in a 61–58 win for Contax.

Commonwealth Bank Trophy

In 1997 Netball Australia replaced the Mobil Superleague with the Commonwealth Bank Trophy league. Netball South Australia formed two brand new teams, Adelaide Thunderbirds and Adelaide Ravens to represent them in the new league. Garville effectively became a feeder team for Ravens.

== Grand finals ==
South Australia state league

Season	Winners	Score	Runners up	Venue
1962	Garville			
1963	Garville			
1964	Garville			
1965	Garville			
1966	Garville			
1967	Garville			
1971	Garville			
1970	Contax		Garville	
1974	Garville			
1987	Garville			
1988	Contax		Garville	Apollo Stadium
1989	Garville		Contax	
1990	Contax		Garville	Apollo Stadium
1991	Contax		Garville	
1992	Garville		Contax	
1993	Garville		Contax	
1994	Garville		Contax	
1995	Garville		Contax	
1996	Contax		Garville	
2014	Matrics	54–44	Garville	Netball SA Stadium
2018	Contax	73–39	Garville	

Mobil Superleague/Prime Minister's Cup

Season	Winners	Score	Runners up	Venue
1993	Adelaide Garville	56–49	Sydney Electricity	Sydney
1994	Adelaide Contax	61–58	Adelaide Garville	

== Home venues ==
Garville was originally based in the Woodville/Woodville Gardens suburbs. They later moved to the Sam Johnson Sportsground in Renown Park. After 2008 they hired courts near the Anzac Highway/Goodwood Road junction for its junior teams while its senior teams trained at St Aloysius College and played their state league games at the Netball SA Stadium.

== Notable players ==
=== Internationals ===
Australia

- Natalie Avellino
- Jenny Borlase
- Chris Burton
- Sharon Burton
- Carol Crawshaw
- Lynette Morony Davey
- Michelle den Dekker
- Dianne Murphy Eckert
- Julie Francou
- Lyn Fullston
- Georgina Gordon
- Vicky Hastings
- Simone McKinnis
- Kay Partington
- Georgina Ramsey
- Bronwyn Roberts
- Peta Squire
- Jayne Taueber
- Charmaine Temby
- Mary White

Australia Fast5

- Samantha Poolman

Jamaica

- Carla Borrego

Australia women's cricket

- Lyn Fullston
- Darcie Brown

=== Adelaide Thunderbirds ===
- Kelly Altmann
- Carla Borrego
- Samantha Poolman
- Joanna Sutton
- Peta Squire

== Head coaches ==
Coach	Years
Chris Burton	1986
Julie Francou	1987–1989
Patricia Mickan	1991–1995
Lyn Fullston	1996
Deb Miller	1997
Cheryl Barnett	1998
Josie Pearce	1999
Alison Clare	2000–2001
Roz Fraser	2002
Michelle Price	2003–2004
Louise Souter	2005–2006
Kirsty Leonard-Down	2007
Michelle den Dekker	2008
Karen Watts & Rachel Porter	2009
Tonya Hutton	2010
Jackie Blyth	2011–2019
Kirsty Leonard Down	2020–

== Premierships ==
- Netball South Australia Premier League
  - Winners: 1962, 1963, 1964, 1965, 1966, 1967, 1971, 1974, 1987, 1989, 1992, 1993, 1994, 1995: 14
  - Runners up: 1970, 1988, 1990, 1991, 1996, 2014, 2018: 7
- Mobil Superleague
  - Winners: 1993
  - Runners up: 1994
