= Mutton (disambiguation) =

Mutton usually refers to sheep meat.

Mutton may also refer to:

== Places ==
- Mutton Bird Island, an irregularly shaped island in south-eastern Australia
- Mutton Brook, a stream that runs between East Finchley and Hendon in the Borough of Barnet, London, England

== Arts, entertainment, and media ==
- Mutton, a 2012 novel by India Knight
- Mutton Birds, a band from New Zealand
- The Muttons, a Singaporean radio presenter duo

== Other uses ==
- Mutton (surname)
- Mutton busting, an event for children held at rodeos similar to bronc riding
- Mutton chops (sideburns), patches of facial hair grown on the sides of the face
- "Mutton" in typography is an informal term for a width of 1 em, used in terms like "mutton quad" (for an em quad) and "mutton dash" (for an em dash).
- Mutton snapper, a species of fish
- "Mutton", used interchangeably with "goat meat" in some Asian and Indian cooking

== See also ==
- Muttonbird (disambiguation)
- Muttonbirding, the seasonal harvesting of the chicks of petrels for food, oil and feathers
