= Mutton (surname) =

Mutton is a surname. Notable people with the surname include:

- Brice Mutton (1890–1949), Australian politician
- John Mutton (disambiguation), multiple people
- Kirby Mutton (born 1984), Australian netball player
- Lerryn Mutton (1924–2015), Australian politician and son of Brice Mutton
- Les Mutton, character in the television series Zeroman
