= James Gallagher (Australian footballer) =

Australian rules footballer (born 1979)

Personal information
- Full name: James Gallagher
- Born: 17 November 1979 (age 46)
- Original team: Norwood
- Height: 176 cm (5 ft 9 in)
- Weight: 70 kg (154 lb)

Playing career^{1}
Years	Club	Games (Goals)
2001–2004	Adelaide	38 (11)
- ^{1} Playing statistics correct to the end of 2004.

James Gallagher (born 17 November 1979) is an Australian rules footballer who played with Adelaide in the Australian Football League (AFL).

Gallagher, a Sacred Heart College alumni, was the third generation of his family to play for Norwood. Both his grandfather Sam Gallagher, and uncle Phil Gallagher, played for Norwood and South Australia.

A midfielder, he was promoted from the Adelaide Rookie List in 2001 and played four seasons for the club, often coming off the bench.

He has gone on to play over 200 games for Norwood and has been club captain since 2007. He won back to back best and fairest awards in 2007 and 2008.

In 2012 he came out of retirement to win a premiership with Norwood.

Gallagher is married to Laura von Bertouch, a former Australia netball international.
