= Tanya Denver =

Australian sports editor

Tanya Denver (nee Lewis)
- Occupation: Journalist
- Known for: Journalism, Sport

Tanya Denver (née Lewis, died 2001) was an Australian journalist and deputy sports editor of The Advertiser who raised the profile of sport, particularly women's sport, in South Australia before her death during childbirth in 2001.

== Legacy ==
Denver's extensive work in covering a wide variety of sport at state, national and international level was widely acknowledged and has been memorialised through the naming of The Tanya Denver Award, which has been presented annually since 2002. This award is presented to the athlete who best demonstrates outstanding sportsmanship and endeavour annually as part of The Advertiser-Channel 7 Sports Star of the Year Awards, which has been awarded to high performance sports men and women including Natalie von Bertouch, Stuart O'Grady and Jason Gillespie.

Netball Australia also acknowledge the loss to sport and journalism with Denver's passing through the Tanya Denver Medal which is awarded annually to journalists and media who exemplify her work and provide the best media coverage of netball in Australia. Denver is again acknowledged for her extensive history in covering elite cycling with the Tanya Denver Memorial Award for the Highest Placed South Australian, as part of the UCI World Tour Event SANTOS Tour Down Under.
