= Mobil Superleague =

Defunct netball league in Australia

- Founded: 1985
- Folded: 1996
- Replaced by: Commonwealth Bank Trophy
- Owner: All Australia Netball Association
- No. of teams: 6/8
- Country: Australia
- Last champion: Melbourne Pumas
- Most titles: Sydney Tigers/Sydney Pulsars (3 titles)
- Broadcaster: ABC
- Sponsors: Esso; Mobil

The Mobil Superleague, originally known as the Esso Superleague, was the top level national Australian netball league between 1985 and 1996. The league was Australia's first national netball league. It was organized by the All Australia Netball Association and featured the state league champions from New South Wales, Victoria, South Australia, Queensland and Western Australia plus a team from the Australian Institute of Sport. Between 1990 and 1996, the winners of the league were also awarded the Prime Minister's Cup and this is sometimes used as an alternative name for the competition. Its main sponsors were Esso and Mobil. In 1997 it was replaced by the Commonwealth Bank Trophy.

== History ==
=== Format ===
The league initially featured the state league champions from New South Wales, Victoria, South Australia, Queensland and Western Australia plus an Australian Institute of Sport team. However on several occasions composite teams, including Sydney Tigers and Melbourne City were entered. Teams were permitted to "import" up to two players for the duration of the tournaments. This saw Shelley O'Donnell and Vicki Wilson play for Adelaide Contax and Simone McKinnis play for Adelaide Garville. During the history of the league, several formats were used. The 1985 and 1986 tournaments featured eight teams, divided into two groups or zones. Two teams from each group then qualified for semi-finals. The 1989 and 1990 seasons both featured six teams playing a single round of matches. The top two then qualified for the final. The 1991 and 1992 seasons each featured two divisions with three teams, both playing two rounds of matches. The three teams from Division 1 and the winners from Division 2 qualified for the semi-finals. By 1993 the competition had evolved into an eight team league with the top four qualifying for the semi-finals. This format remained in place for the final three seasons.

=== Esso Superleague ===
The Esso Superleague was formed in 1985 as a partnership between the All Australia Netball Association and the Australian Institute of Sport. The league was Australia's first national netball league. With a team coached by Wilma Shakespear and featuring Shelley Oates-Wilding and Vicki Wilson, AIS subsequently won the first two tournaments in 1985 and 1986. AIS also played in the 1987 and 1989 finals, losing to Melbourne Blues and Sydney Tigers respectively. Other AIS players from this era included Natalie Avellino, Sharon Finnan and Shelley O'Donnell.

=== Contax Garville rivalry ===
During the early 1990s, two of the most prominent teams in the league were Adelaide Contax and Adelaide Garville. Between 1986 and 1996, Contax and Garville contested every South Australia state league grand final. The rivalry saw the two clubs compete in nine consecutive state league grand finals, plus one controversial Mobil Super League grand final. With teams that included Kathryn Harby, Michelle Fielke and Julie Nykiel, a former Australia women's basketball international, Contax played in three successive grand finals between 1990 and 1992. In 1990 they lost to 52–42 to Melbourne City. Contax then lost out to Sydney Pulsars in both 1991 and 1992. Then in 1993 Garville, in their debut season, with a team coached by Patricia Mickan and featuring Natalie Avellino, Jenny Borlase and Michelle Fielke defeated Sydney Electricity 56–49 in the grand final and finished as champions.

In 1994 the two South Australia rivals met in the Mobil Super League grand final, with Contax winning the title after defeating Garville in controversial circumstances. A Contax team captained by Kathryn Harby and featuring Vicki Wilson and Tania Obst, took on a Garville team that again featured Avellino, Borlase and Fielke. Wilson was the top scorer and the closely fought match finish 47–47 at full time. However, Garville claimed they had actually won the match 48–46. It was alleged that during the third quarter, the official scorer accidentally gave one of Garville's goals to Contax. Despite protests from Garville, extra time was played and resulted in a 61–58 win for Contax.

=== Sydney dominance ===
Teams from Sydney and New South Wales won four titles. With a team coached by Anne Sargeant and featuring five Australia internationals – Nicole Cusack, Keeley Devery, Sue Kenny, Catriona Wagg and Lisa Wilson – Sydney Tigers won the 1989 title after defeating the Australian Institute of Sport 57–36 in the grand final. The final was attended by Bob Hawke, the Prime Minister of Australia. Tigers subsequently played the 1990 season as Sydney Panthers and finished in third place. During the 1991 and 1992 seasons they played as Sydney Pulsars and finished as champions after defeating Adelaide Contax in two successive grand finals. The 1993 season featured two Sydney teams, Sydney Pulsars and Sydney Electricity. With a team featuring Nicole Cusack, Keeley Devery, Sharon Finnan and Sue Kenny, Sydney Electricity finished as minor premiers and grand finalists. The 1994 season again saw two Sydney teams, this time Sydney Electricity and Sydney Cenovis Ku-ring-gai. The latter team featured a young Liz Ellis and were coached by Julie Fitzgerald. They later evolved into Sydney Swifts. With a team featuring Sharon Finnan and Joanne Morgan, Sydney Electricity were 1995 champions, defeating Melbourne Pumas 53–37 in the grand final. For the 1996 season Sydney Electricity became Sydney Energy and finished as minor premiers and grand finalists.

=== Melbourne ===
After Sydney, Melbourne were the league's most successful city, producing three winners. In 1987 Melbourne Blues won the title after defeating Australian Institute of Sport in the final. In 1990 Melbourne City, a composite team coached by Norma Plummer and featuring Roselee Jencke, Simone McKinnis and Shelley O'Donnell defeated Adelaide Contax 52–42 in the grand final. Melbourne City were also the first winners to receive the Prime Minister's Cup. Melbourne Pumas played in the final two grand finals, losing the first to Sydney Electricity and winning the second against Sydney Energy. In both finals, their starting seven included McKinnis, Janine Ilitch, Eloise Southby and Ingrid Dick.

== 1996 teams ==
Teams	State	Debut
Adelaide Contax	South Australia	1989
Adelaide Garville	South Australia	1993
Australian Institute of Sport ^{(Note 1)}	New South Wales	1985
Fremantle Pumas	Western Australia	1996
Melbourne Pumas ^{(Note 2)}	Victoria	1992
Queensland Mac-Attacks ^{(Note 3)}	Queensland	1994
Sydney Energy ^{(Note 4)}	New South Wales	1993
Sydney Cenovis	New South Wales	1994

== Grand finals ==
Esso Superleague

Season	Winners	Score	Runners up	Venue
1985	Australian Institute of Sport	52–46	Manly-Warringah (NSW)	
1986	Australian Institute of Sport	61–35	East Doncaster (Victoria)	
1987	Melbourne Blues		Australian Institute of Sport	
1989	Sydney Tigers	57–36	Australian Institute of Sport	State Sports Centre
1990	Melbourne City	52–42	Adelaide Contax	State Sports Centre

Mobil Superleague

Season	Winners	Score	Runners up	Venue
1991	Sydney Pulsars	59–36	Adelaide Contax	Bruce Stadium
1992	Sydney Pulsars	59–45	Adelaide Contax	State Sports Centre
1993	Adelaide Garville	56–49	Sydney Electricity	State Sports Centre
1994	Adelaide Contax	61–58	Adelaide Garville	Adelaide Powerhouse
1995	Sydney Electricity	53–37	Melbourne Pumas	State Sports Centre
1996	Melbourne Pumas	59–39	Sydney Energy	Adelaide Powerhouse

== Minor premierships ==
Seasons	Team
1989	Sydney Tigers
1990	Melbourne City
1991	Sydney Pulsars
1992	Adelaide Contax
1993	Sydney Electricity
1994	Adelaide Contax ?
1995	Sydney Electricity
1996	Sydney Energy

== Premiership winning coaches ==
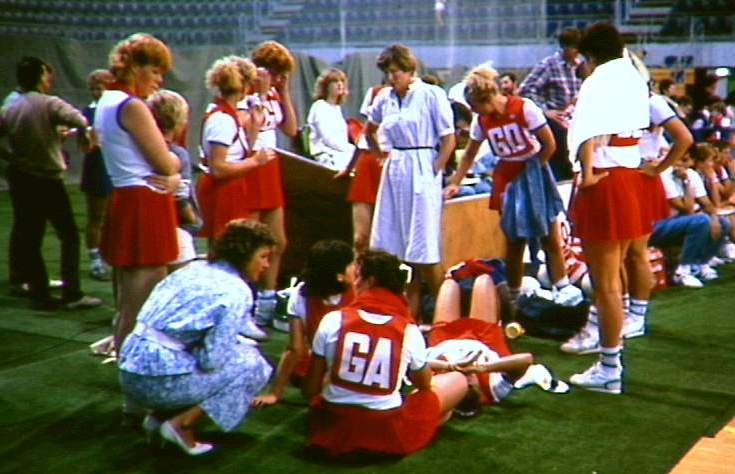
Wilma Shakespear coaching the Australian Institute of Sport team in 1986. Shakespear guided AIS to two premierships in 1985 and 1986.

Season	Head coaches	Team
1985	Wilma Shakespear	Australian Institute of Sport
1986	Wilma Shakespear	Australian Institute of Sport
1987		Melbourne Blues
1989	Anne Sargeant	Sydney Tigers
1990	Norma Plummer	Melbourne City
1991	Carol Sykes	Sydney Pulsars
1992	Margaret Corbett	Sydney Pulsars
1993	Patricia Mickan	Adelaide Garville
1994	Margaret Angove	Adelaide Contax
1995	Carol Sykes	Sydney Electricity
1996	Norma Plummer	Melbourne Pumas

== Main sponsors ==
	Years
Esso	1985–1990
Mobil	1991–1996

== Notes ==
- ^1 Australian Institute of Sport played in the New South Wales State League.
- ^2 Melbourne Pumas also known as Melbourne Waverley Pumas.
- ^3 Queensland Mac-Attacks played the 1994 and 1995 seasons as Brisbane Downey Park.
- ^4 Sydney Energy played the 1993, 1994 and 1995 seasons as Sydney Electricity.
