= Georgia Beaton =

Australian netball player (born 1990)

Personal information
- Born: 22 June 1990 (age 36)
- Height: 1.85 m (6 ft 1 in)
- School: St Peter's Girls' School
- University: University of Adelaide; Australian National University

Netball career
- Playing positions: WD, GD, GK
Years	Club team	Apps
2008–2011	Adelaide Thunderbirds	
2008–2016	Southern Force	
2014	Team Northumbria	
20xx–	Contax	

Georgia Beaton (born 22 June 1990) is an Australian netball player who has played for Adelaide Thunderbirds in the ANZ Championship, for Southern Force in the Australian Netball League, for Team Northumbria in the Netball Superleague and for Contax in the Netball South Australia Premier League. She was a member of the Thunderbirds team that won the 2010 ANZ Championship and of the Southern Force team that won the 2012 ANL title.

== Early life and education ==
Beaton attended St Peter's Girls' School, graduating in 2007. In 2017 St Peter's began organizing an annual challenge match between alumni and senior students. The winners of the match will be awarded the Georgia Beaton Cup. Between 2008 and 2013 Beaton attended the University of Adelaide where she gained a Bachelor of Commerce in Accounting and a Bachelor of Laws. Between 2014 and 2015 she gained a Graduate Diploma in Legal Practice from the Australian National University. She was also a scholarship holder at the South Australian Sports Institute.

== Playing career ==
=== Adelaide Thunderbirds ===
Between 2008 and 2011, Beaton played for Adelaide Thunderbirds in the ANZ Championship. She was 17 when she made her senior debut. She was a member of the Thunderbirds team that won the 2010 ANZ Championship

=== Southern Force ===
Between 2008 and 2016, Beaton played for Southern Force in the Australian Netball League. She was a member of the Southern Force team that won the 2012 ANL title. She was also included in the 2014 and 2016 Southern Force squads.

=== Team Northumbria ===
Beaton played for Team Northumbria during the 2014 Netball Superleague season.

=== Contax ===
Beaton was a member of the Contax teams that won Netball South Australia Premier League titles in 2012, 2013, 2015, 2017 and 2018. In the 2013 grand final she was named MVP. She has captained Contax since 2015. She was named the league's best and fairest player in 2013, 2014, 2015 and 2017. She was also named in the league's team of the year in 2012, 2013, 2014, 2015, 2018 and 2020.

=== Australia ===
In 2010 Beaton represented Australia at under-21 level.

== Employment ==
Between 2008 and 2013 Beaton worked for as a clerk for Adelaide-based firm Kelly & Co. Lawyers.

== Honours ==
Adelaide Thunderbirds

- ANZ Championship
  - Winners: 2010
  - Runners Up: 2009

Southern Force

- Australian Netball League
  - Winners: 2012

Contax

- Netball South Australia Premier League
  - Winners: 2012, 2013, 2015, 2017, 2018
