= Adelaide Thunderbirds Futures =

Australian Netball League team

- Founded: 2008
- Based in: Adelaide
- Regions: South Australia
- Home venue: Adelaide Entertainment Centre
- Head coach: Jacqui Illman
- Premierships: 2 (2012, 2022)
- League: Super Netball Reserves
- Website: sa.netball.com.au
Playing dress

The Adelaide Thunderbirds Futures, formerly the Southern Force, is an Australian netball team that represents Netball South Australia in the Super Netball Reserves competition. The Thunderbirds Futures is the reserve team of Suncorp Super Netball club, Adelaide Thunderbirds. The team is made up of selected stand-out players from the Netball South Australia Premier League, Adelaide Thunderbirds training partners and some contracted Thunderbirds players.

Under the Southern Force name, the team were champions of the Australian Netball League/Australian Netball Championships in 2012 and 2022 and were runners-up in 2015.

== History ==
=== Australian Netball League ===
Between 2008 and 2011, Netball South Australia's ANL team simply played as South Australia. They were a foundation member of the league. In 2012, they rebranded to become the Southern Force, a name that was first suggested by members of the 2011 ANL squad. In 2012 with a squad that included Kelly Altmann, Georgia Beaton, Cody Lange, Maddy Proud, Melissa Rowland, Kate Shimmin and Sheree Wingard, Force finished as ANL Champions, defeating NNSW Waratahs 50–36 in the grand final. In 2015, with a squad that saw Lange, Shimmin and Wingard joined by Sarah Klau, Hannah Petty, Samantha Poolman and Maddy Turner, the Southern Force reached the grand final for a second time. However, on this occasion they lost 58–46 to Victorian Fury.

=== Super Netball Reserves ===
In 2025, the Australian Netball Championships (ANC) was rebranded to the Super Netball Reserves by Netball Australia. This new format of the competition ran alongside the Suncorp Super Netball season, with Thunderbirds Futures games taking place alongside the Adelaide Thunderbirds games, usually pre- or post-SSN match at the same venue, or alternatively the day before or after an SSN match at a different venue.

== Grand finals ==
Season	Winners	Score	Runners up	Venue
2012	Southern Force	50–36	NNSW Waratahs	Waverley Netball Centre, Melbourne
2015	Victorian Fury	58–46	Southern Force	Waverley Netball Centre, Melbourne
2022	Southern Force	59-57	Victorian Fury	Traralgon

== Notable players ==
=== 2026 squad ===
2026 Adelaide Thunderbirds Futures roster
Players
Coaches

Name	Pos	DOB	Height	Club	Nat	Caps
Lucy Voyvodic (Note: Contracted eleventh player for Adelaide Thunderbirds) (c)	WA, C		–	Matrics	(Australia)
Lucy Denton	WA, C		–	Garville	(Australia)
Anna Goad	GK, GD		–	Contax	(Australia)
Brooke Irlam	GS, GA		–	Garville	(Australia)
Jemma Kelly (Note: Training partner for Adelaide Thunderbirds)	GD, GK		–	Matrics	(Australia)
Jazmin McKay	GD, WD, C		–	Contax	(Australia)
Samaya Oakley	GS		–	Contax	(Australia)
Tabitha Packer	WD, GD		–	Contax	(Australia)
Natalie Sligar	WA, GA		–	Oakdale	(Australia)
Jordi Vidmar	GS, GA		–	Contax	(Australia)
Charlotte Walker	GK, GD		–	Oakdale	(Australia)
Molly Watson	GK, GD		–	Contax	(Australia)
Ellie Marshall (Note: Training partner for Thunderbirds Reserves)	WD, C		–	Oakdale	(Australia)
Elouise Nordhausen	GS, GA		–	Matrics	(Australia)
Anessah Oakley	GD, GK		–	Contax	(Australia)
Aaleya Turner	WD, GD		–	Matrics	(Australia)

Head coach

- (Australia) Jacqui Illman

Assistant coach

- (Australia) Jenny Borlase

Notes

- (c) – Captain
- (cc) – Co-captain
- (vc) – Vice-captain
- – Injury / maternity leave
- (TRP) – Temporary Replacement Player
Player profiles: Team website
Last updated: 27 April 2026

=== Internationals ===
Australia

- Lucy Austin
- Matilda Garrett
- Georgie Horjus
- Sarah Klau
- Samantha Poolman
- Maddy Proud
- Kate Shimmin
- Maddy Turner

England

- Beth Cobden
- Sasha Glasgow
- Kate Shimmin

Jamaica

- Malysha Kelly

New Zealand

- Cathrine Tuivaiti

Samoa

- Cathrine Tuivaiti

=== Adelaide Thunderbirds ===
- Gia Abernethy
- Kelly Altmann
- Lucy Austin
- Georgia Beaton
- Chelsea Blackman
- Kristina Brice
- Emily Burgess
- Sophie Casey
- Jane Fitzgerald
- Lauren Frew
- Matilda Garrett
- Sasha Glasgow
- Kayla Graham
- Jessica Hazel
- Charlee Hodges
- Georgie Horjus
- Sarah Klau
- Cody Lange
- Maisie Nankivell
- Laura Packard
- Hannah Petty
- Samantha Poolman
- Maddy Proud
- Stephanie Puopolo
- Melissa Rowland
- Kate Shimmin
- Cathrine Tuivaiti
- Sanmarie Visser
- Leigh Waddington
- Khao Watts
- Tayla Williams
- Sheree Wingard

=== League MVP ===
Season	Player
2015	Kate Shimmin
2025	Lucy Voyvodic

== Head coaches ==
Coach	Years
Tania Obst	2010, 2012
Dan Ryan	2013
Tania Obst	2014–2016
Brian Lines	2017–2020
Jacqui Illman	2021-present

== Premierships ==
- Australian Netball League
  - Winners: 2012
  - Runners up: 2015
- Australian Netball Championships
  - Winners: 2022
