= Carla Borrego =

Jamaica netball international

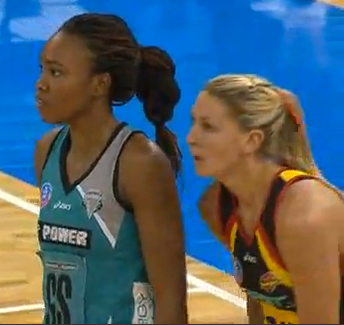
- Borrego (left) and Casey Williams (right) in the 2010 ANZ Championship grand final

Personal information
- Full name: Carla Borrego (Née: Williams)
- Born: 11 November 1983 (age 42) Jamaica
- Height: 1.93 m (6 ft 4 in)
- School: Queen's School
- University: Broward College; University of Miami

Netball career
- Playing positions: GS, GK
Years	Club team	Apps
200x–2003	Waulgrovians	
2009–2016	Adelaide Thunderbirds	
2017	Sirens	
2017-2018	Garville	
Years	National team	Caps
2003, 2022	Jamaica	
Medal record
Representing Jamaica
World Netball Championships
Bronze medal – third place	2003 Kingston	Team

Carla Borrego (born 11 November 1983), also known as Carla Williams and Carla Williams-Borrego, is a former Jamaica netball international. She was a member of the Jamaica team that won the bronze medal at the 2003 World Netball Championships. She subsequently switched to women's basketball, playing for Broward Seahawks and Miami Hurricanes. In 2009, after returning to netball, Borrego began playing for Adelaide Thunderbirds in the ANZ Championship. She was a prominent member of the Thunderbirds teams that won the 2010 and 2013 titles. She has also played for Sirens in the Netball Superleague and for Garville in the Netball South Australia Premier League.

== Early life, education and basketball ==
Borrego is originally from Green Island in Hanover, Jamaica. She attended Green Island High School and Queen's School. Leaving Jamaica in 2003, Carla moved to Florida where she initially attended Broward College. She then gained a basketball scholarship to the University of Miami, where she completed a Criminology and Liberal Arts degree. While attending college and university, Borrego also played women's basketball for Broward Seahawks in FCSAA competitions and the NJCAA Women's Basketball Championship and for Miami Hurricanes in the Atlantic Coast Conference.

== Netball ==
=== Early years ===
Borrego, then Carla Williams, was discovered playing netball in regional competitions by the husband of Jamaica international, Elaine Davis. She originally played as a goal keeper, but became a goal shooter when a team she played for had too many defenders. Davis and her husband encouraged Williams to play in a Kingston-based league. She subsequently played for Waulgrovians.

=== Adelaide Thunderbirds ===
In 2009, after completing her degree at the University of Miami, Borrego signed for Adelaide Thunderbirds in the ANZ Championship. She was a prominent member of the Thunderbirds team that won the 2010 ANZ Championship; in the grand final against Waikato Bay of Plenty Magic, Borrego scored 40 out of 46, including 11 out of 13 in the fourth quarter as Thunderbirds won 52–42. In 2013, Borrego won a second ANZ Championship with Thunderbirds. Borrego continued to play for Thunderbirds until she announced her retirement at the end of the 2016 season, finishing her ANZ Championship career with 2,870 goals.

=== Sirens ===
During the 2017 Netball Superleague season, Borrego played for Sirens, in that team's inaugural Superleague season.

=== Garville ===
In 2017 Borrego began playing for Garville in the Netball South Australia Premier League. In 2018 she played for Garville in the league's grand final, helping the club finish as runners up. She was also named as the league's 2018 MVP and was included in the league's Team of the Year.

=== International ===
Jamaica

Borrego was a member of the Jamaica team that won the bronze medal at the 2003 World Netball Championships. She finished the tournament as the second highest scorer after New Zealand's Irene van Dyk. Jamaica tried to call Borrego up for the 2007 World Netball Championships but the University of Miami refused to release her from her scholarship commitments. In January 2010, following her return to netball, it was reported that Borrego was going to make a comeback for Jamaica. However in November 2010 she announced that she was no longer available. In September 2022 Borrego, along with Romelda Aiken-George and coach Connie Francis, was added to the Jamaica team for the 2022 Taini Jamison Trophy Series due to several other players being unavailable.

Australia

In May 2011 Borrego declared an interest in playing for Australia and becoming an Australian citizen. In 2013 she attended Australia training camps as a guest. In February 2015 she became a citizen. In April 2015 she was included as a training partner in an Australia squad that was preparing for the 2015 Netball World Cup.

== Honours ==
Adelaide Thunderbirds

- ANZ Championship
  - Winners: 2010, 2013

Garville

- Netball South Australia Premier League
  - Runners up: 2018
