= Netball South Australia =

Netball governing body

- Jurisdiction: South Australia
- Membership: 34,699
- Abbreviation: Netball SA
- Founded: 1928
- Affiliation: Netball Australia
- Headquarters: Netball SA Stadium
- Location: 155 Railway Terrace; Mile End South; Adelaide
- President: Graeme Gilbert
- CEO: Bronwyn Klei

Official website
- sa.netball.com.au

Netball South Australia is the governing body for netball in South Australia. It is affiliated to Netball Australia. It is responsible for organizing and managing the Netball South Australia Premier League as well as numerous other leagues and competitions for junior and youth teams. It is also responsible for organizing and managing two elite level representatives teams, Adelaide Thunderbirds, who compete in the Suncorp Super Netball, and Southern Force who compete in the Australian Netball League. Its headquarters are based at Netball SA Stadium.

== History ==
Netball South Australia was formed in 1928 and was originally known as the South Australia Women's Basketball Association (SAWBA). It later became the South Australian Netball Association (SANA).

== Teams ==
=== Representative teams ===
Team	Leagues	Years
Adelaide Thunderbirds	Suncorp Super Netball; ANZ Championship; Commonwealth Bank Trophy	2017– 2008–2016; 1997–2007
Southern Force	Australian Netball League	2008–
Adelaide Ravens	Commonwealth Bank Trophy	1997–2002

=== Premier League clubs ===
The 2020 Netball South Australia Premier League featured eight clubs, entering teams in two divisions – the Premier Division and Reserves Division.

Team	Home city/town/suburb	Founded
Contax Netball Club	Woodville	1952
Garville Netball Club	Woodville Gardens/Woodville	1952
Matrics Netball Club	Elizabeth	1972
Metro Jets	Woodville	1995
Newton Jaguars Netball Club	Paradise	
Oakdale Netball Club	Oaklands/Warradale	1962
South Adelaide Netball Club	Blackwood	1999
Tango Netball Club	City of Tea Tree Gully	1946

== Competitions ==
- Netball South Australia Premier League
- Country Championships
- Adelaide Metropolitan Netball Division
- City Night Division

== Netball SA Board ==
Graeme Gilbert has served as President of the Netball SA Board since 2009. He has been a director since 2001.

Notable board members

Members	Years
Jenny Borlase	2007–2016
Natalie von Bertouch	2015–2016
Glenn Docherty	2012–
