= Sheree Wingard =

Australian netball player

Personal information
- Born: 18 August 1988 (age 37)
- Occupation: Student
- Height: 1.70 m (5 ft 7 in)

Netball career
- Playing positions: WA, C
Years	Club team	Apps
2008–present	Adelaide Thunderbirds	
- Updated on 2009-03-30

Sheree Wingard (born 18 August 1988) is an Australian netball player in the ANZ Championship, playing for the Adelaide Thunderbirds. She started her netball career playing for a small, but successful club, Cheerio Eagles. She is also a student studying Primary and Junior Primary Teaching.
