= Kristen Heinrich =

Australian netball player

Personal information
- Full name: Kristen Heinrich
- Born: 28 August 1979 (age 46)
- Occupation: Sales representative
- Height: 1.80 m (5 ft 11 in)

Netball career
- Playing positions: GS, GA
Years	Club team	Apps
- Adelaide Ravens
2008	Adelaide Thunderbirds	
Years	National team	Caps
2004–2007	Australia	
1999	Australia U21	
- Updated on 2009-03-20

Kristen Heinrich (previously used the surname Hughes; born 28 August 1979) is an Australian netball player, who played for the Adelaide Thunderbirds in the ANZ Championship in 2008.

Kristen received her first call up to the Australian Netball Team in June 2004, after Australian shooter Catherine Cox was injured a week before the team was due to fly to New Zealand for a Test Series against the Silver Ferns. An Australian Netball Diamond player with 5 international test caps.

After Heinrich was selected in the Australian 21U Squad in 1999 while playing with the Adelaide Ravens, her sporting career stagnated as the Ravens were wooden spooners. Star coach of the Adelaide Thunderbirds, Marg Angove, saw her potential and recruited her. Her strengths include accurate shooting, energy, movement, and tricky use of "the roll" to avoid defenders and open the shooting circle for effective threading of the ball.
