= Keirra Trompf =

Australian netball player

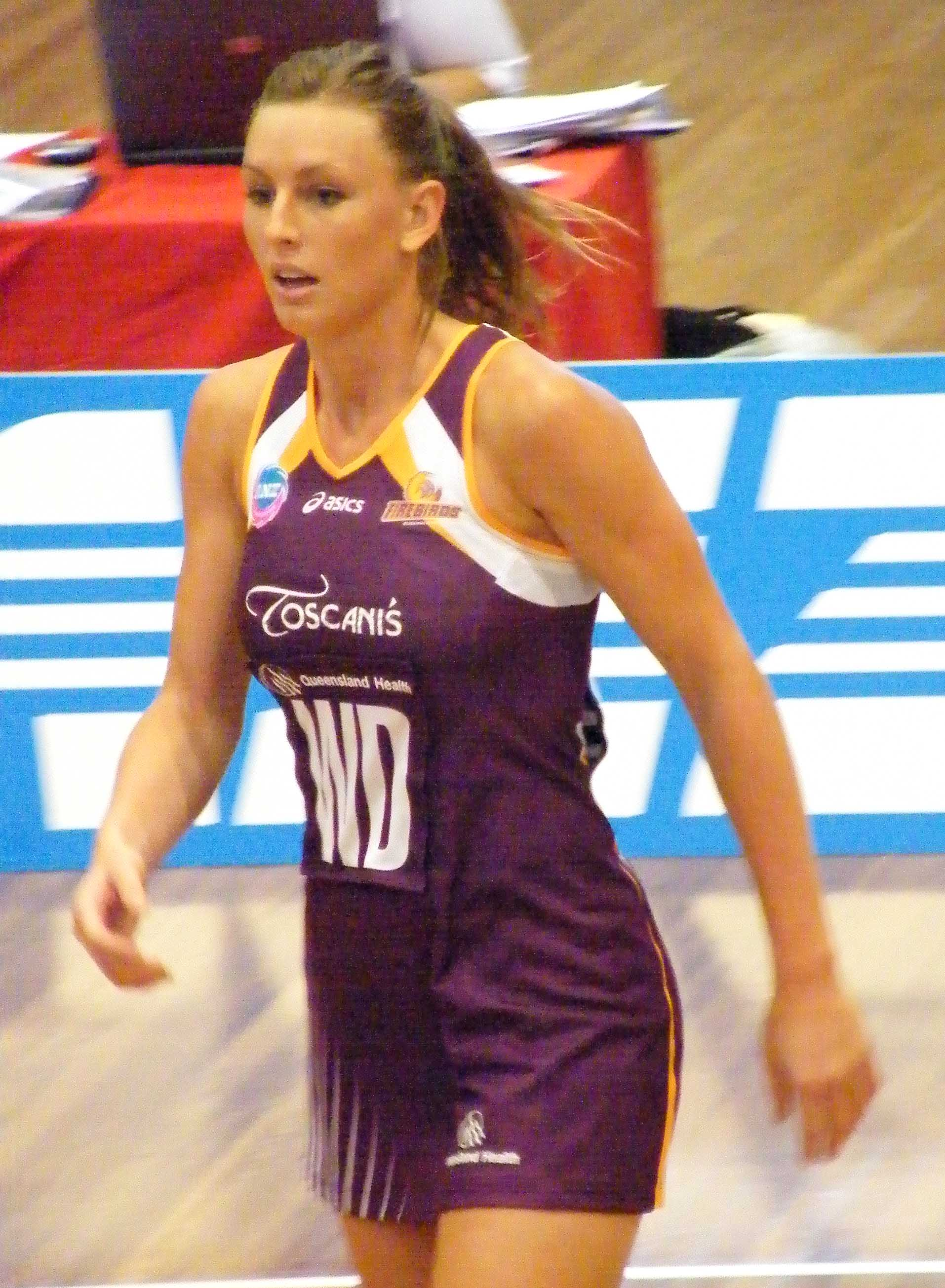

Personal information
- Born: 16 September 1985 (age 40) Warrnambool, Australia
- Height: 1.83 m (6 ft 0 in)

Netball career
- Playing position: WD
Years	Club team	Apps
2005–2013	Queensland Firebirds	
- Updated on 2018-6-17

Keirra Trompf (born 16 September 1985 in Warrnambool, Australia) is a former Australian netball player in the ANZ Championship, playing for the Queensland Firebirds.
