= Alex Clarke (netball) =

Australian retired netball player

Personal information
- Full name: Alex Clarke (Née: Hodge)
- Born: 30 September 1977 (age 48)
- Occupation: Registered nurse
- Height: 1.70 m (5 ft 7 in)

Netball career
- Playing positions: WA, C
Years	Club team	Apps
2008	Adelaide Thunderbirds	
Years	National team	Caps
2002	Australia	24
Medal record
Representing Australia
Commonwealth Games
Gold medal – first place	2002 Manchester	Netball

Alex Clarke (née Hodge; born 30 September 1977) is an Australian retired netball player. Clarke was a member of the Australian national team that won gold at the 2002 Commonwealth Games in Manchester, England. Domestically, she played 113 matches over 11 years in the Commonwealth Bank Trophy, playing for the Adelaide Thunderbirds, Queensland Firebirds and Sydney Sandpipers. Clarke also played for the Adelaide Thunderbirds in the ANZ Championship. After the 2008 season, Clarke announced her retirement from netball.
