= Natalie Medhurst =

Australian former netball player (born 1984)

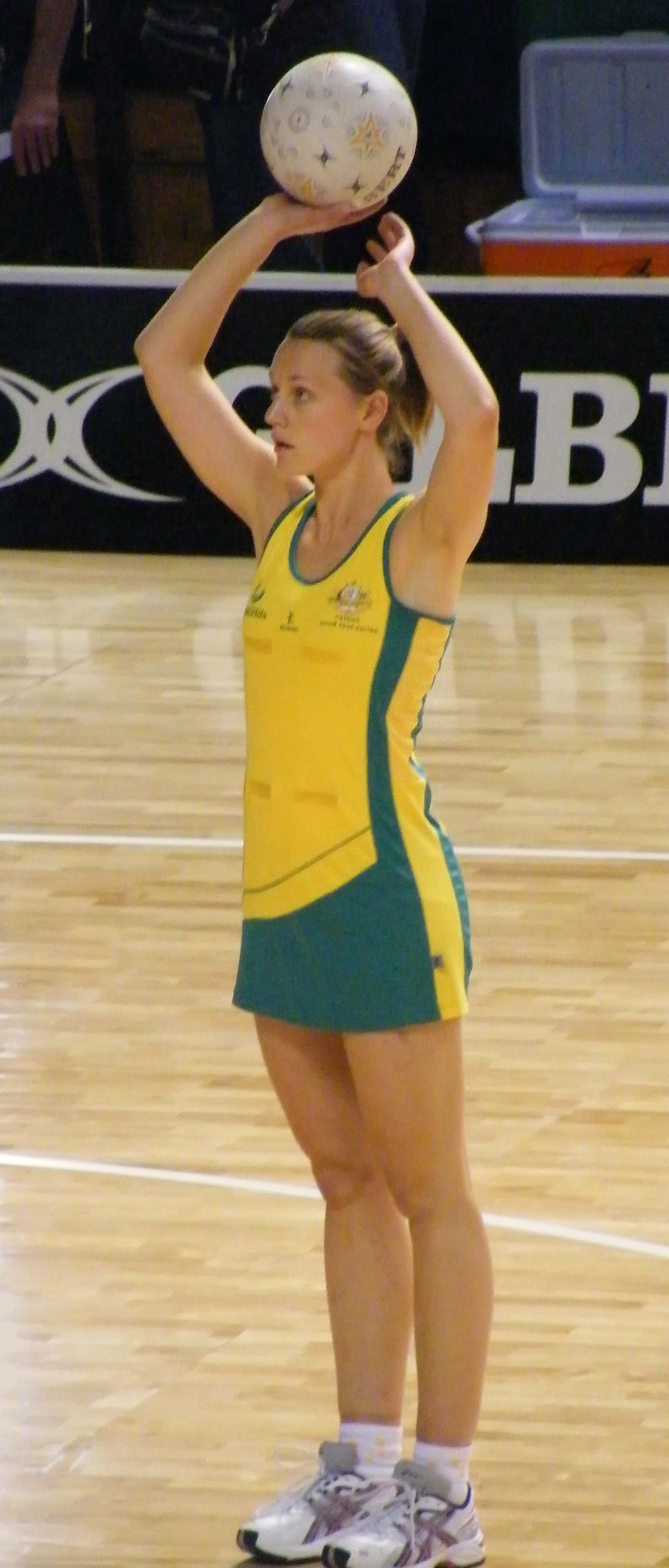

Personal information
- Full name: Natalie Butler
- Born: 20 January 1984 (age 42) Warracknabeal, Victoria
- Height: 178 cm (5 ft 10 in)
- School: Tenison Woods College; Mercedes College

Netball career
- Playing positions: GA, GS, WA
Years	Club team	Apps
2004–2009	Adelaide Thunderbirds	
2010–2013	Queensland Firebirds	
2014–2018	West Coast Fever	
2019–2020	Collingwood Magpies	15
2023	West Coast Fever	1
2024	Melbourne Mavericks	1
Years	National team	Caps
2007–2017	Australia	86
Medal record
Representing Australia
Netball World Championships
Gold medal – first place	2007 Auckland	Netball
Gold medal – first place	2011 Singapore	Netball
Gold medal – first place	2015 Australia	Netball
Commonwealth Games
Gold medal – first place	2014 Glasgow	Netball
Silver medal – second place	2010 Delhi	Netball
World Netball Series
Bronze medal – third place	2009 Manchester	Fastnet
- Updated on 27 March 2012

Natalie Butler (born 20 January 1984) is an Australian international netball player. As well as playing for several clubs in Australia's domestic competitions, she also made multiple appearances for the Australian Diamonds in various international competitions and tests.

== Netball career ==
=== Domestic career ===
Born in Warracknabeal in Victoria, she moved to Millicent in South Australia at the age of 3. She played for local club Millicent Saints as a junior. Medhurst rose to prominence in 2004, when the then-twenty-year-old had a strong debut for the Adelaide Thunderbirds. Replacing club stalwart Jacqui Delaney, Medhurst put many of the world's best defenders to task with her accuracy, speed, and elusive nature. With the start of the ANZ Championship in 2008, Medhurst re-signed with the Thunderbirds for the inaugural season in. She stayed at the club for two years, before signing with the Queensland Firebirds for the 2010 season. At the Firebirds she claimed the 2011 premiership and was named the season's MVP.

In 2014, Medhurst moved to Perth to play for the West Coast Fever, reuniting with her former Australian coach Norma Plummer, shifting with Firebirds wing attack Chelsea Pitman, and forging stronger links with Australian goal shooter Caitlin Bassett. Later, she was announced as club captain. Medhurst quickly became the highest-profile player at the Fever. In 2017 the new Super Netball league was formed and Medhurst signed a three-year deal with the Fever that was supposed to have resulted in her staying at the club until the end of the 2019 season. Controversially, Medhurst's final year option with the Fever was not picked up after their 2018 campaign ended up in a grand final loss. On 14 September 2018, Collingwood Magpies Netball announced they had signed her on a two-year deal. In 2019 Medhurst played 15 matches for the Magpies and had a shooting accuracy rate of 82%. She announced she would step back from her netball career for much of the 2020 season, due to pregnancy. Despite harbouring hopes of returning to play for the Magpies in the latter half of the 2020 season, Medhurst was unable to play any games due to the travel and quarantine restrictions stemming from the COVID-19 pandemic. She announced her retirement from the game on 9 September 2020.

==== Super Netball statistics ====
Statistics are correct to the end of the 2018 season.

Season	Team	G/A	GA	RB	CPR	FD	IC	DF	PN	TO	MP
2017	Fever	185/240	119	6	248	273	4	16	36	60	14
2018	Fever	124/152	413	3	266	556	1	10	50	55	14
2019	Magpies	0/0	0	0	0	0	0	0	0	0	0
Career		309/392	532	9	514	829	5	26	86	115	28

=== International career ===
Medhurst went on to represent Australia at the 2005 World Youth Championships, in Fort Lauderdale Florida, where they finished in third place. She continued to develop as a player at open level, and in 2007 she finally made her debut with the Australia national netball team against Jamaica on 8 July 2007. Her shooting accuracy was 100% during the quarter she was on, shooting 7 from 7.

Medhurst continued her strong debut season for Australia during the 2007 Netball World Championships, where she ended the preliminary rounds as the third-most accurate shooter at the championships, with a strike rate of 91%. Her rise continued in the grand final against New Zealand, when she was brought on in the final quarter when Australia's senior shooters were struggling. She calmly converted all three of her attempts at goal, with Australia winning the final 42–38, making Medhurst a world champion. She cemented her position in the Australian line-up over time, and was named in the national team's 2014 Commonwealth Games side where she gold. By 2015 Medhurst had reached the elite ranks of international netball, becoming one of only eight players to have won three world titles, with success at the 2015 Netball World Cup in Sydney. Medhurst played a crucial supporting role in the final to shooter Caitlin Bassett that saw the Diamonds win their third-straight World Championship, winning 58-55. Medhurst and teammate Julie Corletto both made their debut together in 2007 and finished with their third World Championship, with Corletto retiring from netball following the Tournament. She continued to feature in the Diamonds line-ups in 2016, though in June 2017 she was left out of the squad for the international season.

Awards
Preceded by Liana Leota	ANZ Championship MVP; 2011 winner (with Leana de Bruin)	Incumbent
