= Netball SA Stadium =

Netball venue in Adelaide

- Interactive map of Netball SA Stadium
- Former names: ETSA Park; Priceline Stadium
- Location: 1155 Railway Terrace; Mile End South; Adelaide; South Australia
- Coordinates: 34°55′57″S 138°34′43″E
- Owner: Government of South Australia
- Operator: Netball South Australia
- Capacity: 3,200
- Surface: Sprung wooden floors

Construction
- Opened: 14 March 2001
- Cost: A$11.1m

Tenants
- Adelaide Thunderbirds; Southern Force; Netball South Australia Premier League (featuring Contax and Garville); Adelaide Ravens

Netball SA Stadium is an Australia netball stadium based in Mile End South, Adelaide. Due to sponsorship and naming rights arrangements, it has also been known as ETSA Park and Priceline Stadium. The stadium is owned by the Government of South Australia who in turn lease it to Netball South Australia. It is the main home venue for Adelaide Thunderbirds of Suncorp Super Netball and Southern Force of the Australian Netball League. It is also the main host venue for the Netball South Australia Premier League. It also serves as the headquarters for Netball South Australia.

== History ==
=== Construction ===
Netball SA Stadium was officially opened on 14 March 2001. It was built on former railyards at Mile End South. It was built at a cost of A$11.1 million, funded by the Government of South Australia and Netball South Australia. The stadium is owned by the Government of South Australia who in turn lease it to Netball South Australia.

=== Tenants ===
Netball SA Stadium is the main home venue for both Adelaide Thunderbirds and Southern Force. It also hosts numerous netball competitions and tournaments organised by Netball South Australia including the Netball South Australia Premier League, the Country Championships, the Adelaide Metropolitan Netball Division and the City Night Division. The stadium has also hosted international test series featuring Australia, New Zealand, South Africa and England.

=== Facilities ===
Netball SA Stadium features four indoor courts with sprung wooden floors. The indoor stadium has a seating capacity of 3,200 on fixed and retractable seating while outside there are 26 netball courts and parking for up to 750 cars. Between 2015 and 2016 the outdoor courts were upgraded. Between 2018 and 2019 further upgrades including car park improvements, office refurbishments and improvements to player facilities upgrades were carried out. In November 2020 Netball South Australia announced funding from the Government of South Australia for further upgrades, including increasing the stadium capacity.

Due to the stadiums limited capacity, the Thunderbirds play most of their games at the 10,000 seat Adelaide Entertainment Centre located a short distance away on Port Road in Hindmarsh, or alternatively at the teams original home, the 8,000 capacity Adelaide Arena located in Findon.

== Naming rights ==
When sponsored by ETSA Utilities, Netball SA Stadium was known as ETSA Park. The naming rights deal with ETSA ended in 2012. Between 2015 and 2020 the stadium was known as Priceline Stadium due to a sponsorship arrangement with Priceline.
