= Natalie von Bertouch =

Australia netball player (born 1982)

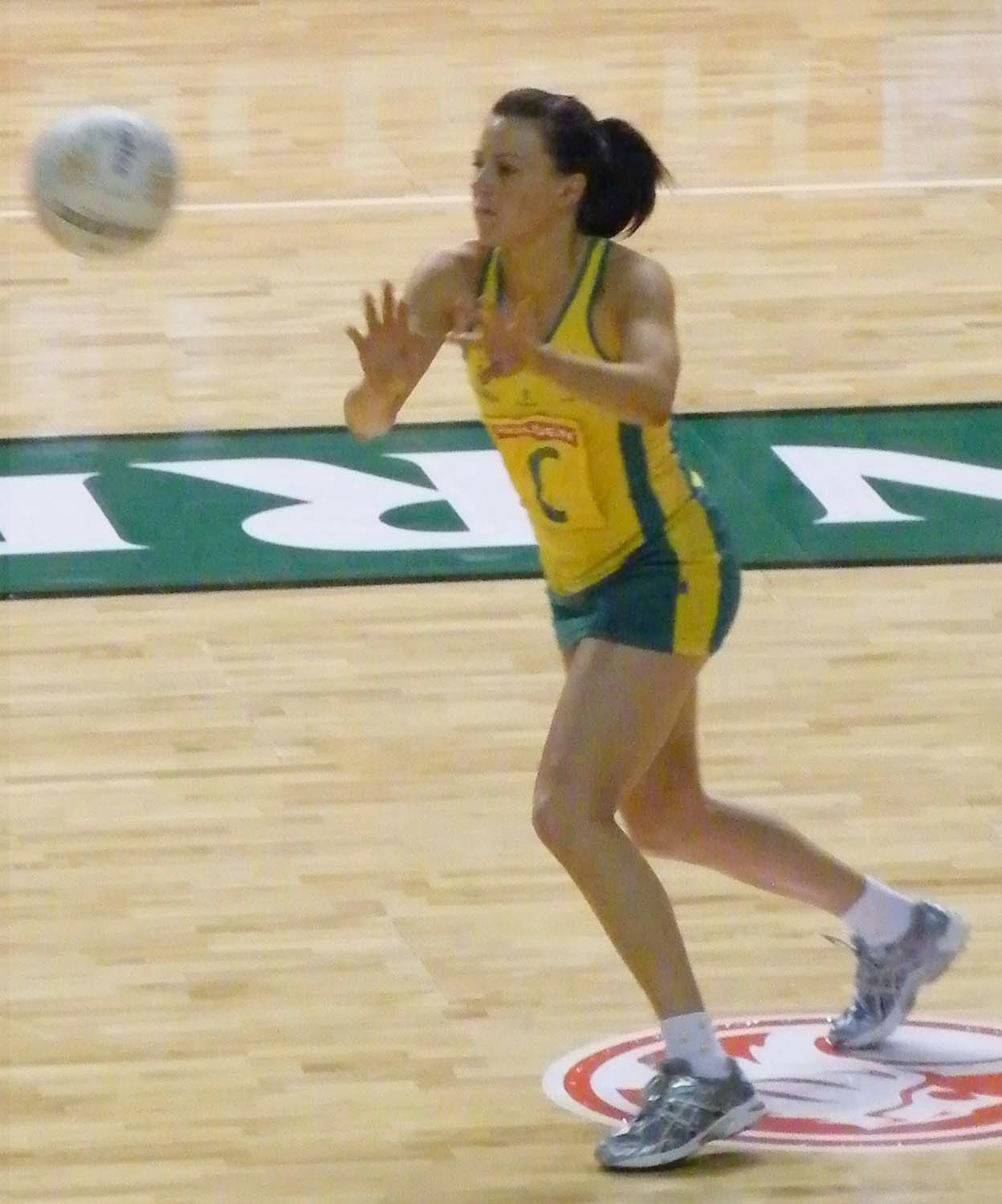

Personal information
- Full name: Natalie Bode (Née: von Bertouch)
- Born: 16 December 1982 (age 43) Adelaide, South Australia
- Occupation: Dietician
- Height: 1.75 m (5 ft 9 in)
- Spouse: Jace Bode
- Relative: Laura von Bertouch (sister)
- School: Immanuel College
- University: Flinders University

Netball career
- Playing positions: C, WA, WD
Years	Club team	Apps
199x–20xx	Contax	
2001	Australian Institute of Sport	
2002–2013	Adelaide Thunderbirds	
Years	National team	Caps
2004–2012	Australia	76
Medal record
Representing Australia
World Netball Championships
Gold medal – first place	2007 Auckland	Team
Gold medal – first place	2011 Singapore	Team
Commonwealth Games
Silver medal – second place	2006 Melbourne	Team
Silver medal – second place	2010 Delhi	Team
World Netball Series
Bronze medal – third place	2009 Manchester	Team

Natalie von Bertouch /ˈbɜːrˌtoʊ/ BUR-toh; (born 16 December 1982), also known as Natalie Bode, is a former Australia netball international. Between 2004 and 2012 she made 76 senior appearances for Australia. Bertouch was a member of the Australia teams that won the gold medals at the 2007 and 2011 World Netball Championships. She captained Australia at the latter tournament. She was also a member of the Australia teams that won the silver medals at the 2006 and 2010 Commonwealth Games. At club level, Bertouch captained Adelaide Thunderbirds to two ANZ Championship titles in 2010 and 2013. Her older sister Laura von Bertouch is also a former netball player. The two sisters were team mates with both Thunderbirds and Australia.

== Early life, family and education ==
Bertouch is the daughter of Terry von Bertouch, who, during the late 1960s and 1970s, played Australian rules football for North Adelaide and Norwood in the South Australian National Football League. Her older sister, Laura von Bertouch, is also a former Australia netball international. The Bertouch sisters were both educated at Immanuel College. Between 2004 and 2008, Bertouch attended Flinders University, where she gained a Bachelor's degree in Dietetics and Clinical Nutrition Services. In November 2014, she married the Australian rules footballer, Jace Bode. They have two daughters.

== Playing career ==
=== Contax ===
Bertouch and her sister, Laura von Bertouch, began playing netball aged seven and nine at the Contax Netball Club. In 2000, together with Tracey Neville, the Bertouch sisters were members of the Contax team that won the South Australia state league. Natalie also helped Contax win further state leagues title in 2002 and 2003.

=== AIS ===
During the 2001 season, Bertouch played for the Australian Institute of Sport. She was a member of the AIS team that won the South Australia state league. She was also named the league's best and fairest player and was selected in the Team of the Year.

=== Adelaide Thunderbirds ===
Between 2001 and 2013, Bertouch played for Adelaide Thunderbirds. During the Commonwealth Bank Trophy era she was named in the Team of the Year for three successive seasons between 2005 and 2007. In 2008, Bertouch became the inaugural ANZ Championship Thunderbirds captain. She subsequently captained Thunderbirds to two ANZ Championship titles. In 2010, after finishing second during the regular season, they defeated the minor premiers, New South Wales Swifts, in the major semi-final and Waikato Bay of Plenty Magic in the grand final. In 2013, Natalie von Bertouch captained Thunderbirds to a second premiership after they defeated Queensland Firebirds in the grand final. Shortly after the 2013 grand final Bertouch announced she was retiring as a player.

=== Australia ===
Between 2004 and 2012 Bertouch made 76 senior appearances for Australia. Bertouch was a member of the Australia team that won the gold medal at the 2007 World Netball Championships. She was also a member of the Australia teams that won the silver medals at the 2006 and 2010 Commonwealth Games. Bertouch captained Australia for the first time in 2008, in the absence of regular captain Sharelle McMahon. She subsequently captained Australia when they won the gold medal at the 2011 World Netball Championships.

Tournaments	Place
2006 Commonwealth Games	2nd place, silver medalist(s)
2007 World Netball Championships	1st place, gold medalist(s)
2009 World Netball Series	3rd place, bronze medalist(s)
2010 Commonwealth Games	2nd place, silver medalist(s)
2011 World Netball Championships	1st place, gold medalist(s)
2012 Netball Quad Series	1st place, gold medalist(s)

== Employment ==
Since retiring as a netball player, Bertouch has been involved in various projects. Since 2015 she has worked for Cancer Council SA. In 2016 and 2017 she worked as a columnist for The Advertiser. In 2015 and 2016 she served as a Netball South Australia board member. In 2018 she joined the Adelaide Thunderbirds coaching staff as a mid-court specialist coach. She also serves as the Transition Manager of the Australian Netball Players’ Association.

== Honours ==
Australia

- World Netball Championships
  - Winners: 2007, 2011
- Commonwealth Games
  - Runners Up: 2006, 2010
- Netball Quad Series
  - Winners: 2012

Adelaide Thunderbirds

- ANZ Championship
  - Winners: 2010, 2013
  - Runners Up: 2009

Australian Institute of Sport

- South Australia State League
  - Winners: 2001

Contax

- South Australia State League
  - Winners: 2000, 2002, 2003
