= Kathryn Harby-Williams =

Australian netball player

Kathryn Harby-Williams AM
Personal information
- Born: 16 July 1969 (age 57) Adelaide, Australia
- Height: 179.5 cm (5 ft 10 1/2 in)

Netball career
- Playing positions: GD, WD
Years	Club team	Apps
2004–06	Auckland Diamonds	
1997–2003	Adelaide Thunderbirds	
Years	National team	Caps
1991–2003	Australia	95
Medal record
Representing Australia
Commonwealth Games
Gold medal – first place	2002 Manchester	Netball
Gold medal – first place	1998 Kuala Lumpur	Netball
Netball World Championships
Silver medal – second place	2003 Kingston	Netball
Gold medal – first place	1999 Christchurch	Netball
Gold medal – first place	1995 Birmingham	Netball
- Updated on 2015-06-24

Kathryn Harby-Williams AM (born 16 July 1969) is an Australian netball player and television presenter, who captained the Australian netball team. She is the Chief Executive Officer, Secretary and Treasurer of the Australian Netball Players’ Association.

Harby-Williams currently works with Radio Sport New Zealand and is a Sky TV commentator for Sky Sport 1's live netball coverage of the ANZ Championship and international tests, along with former Silver Ferns ] and Anna Stanley, and with co-Australian national representative Natalie Avellino; she also co-hosts the weekly netball show On Court with Stanley. One of the most successful players of her era, she represented Australia for twelve years (95 caps) in her usual positions of goal defence and wing defence, including four years as captain from 2000 to 2003. She was victorious at two World Championships in 1995 and 1999, and part of the team winning gold at the Commonwealth Games in 1998 and 2002. She was named Australian International Player of the Year in 2001.

Stemming from her failure to be selected in a representative team in her teenage years, she would take 100 sprints up a 30-metre hill as a regular pre-season training. At another time after spraining her ankle in a match against New Zealand, despite missing court training she managed to put in four kilometres in the pool next day.

She was the inaugural captain of the Adelaide Thunderbirds in the Commonwealth Bank Trophy national league from 1997 until 2003, after she retired from Australian netball and moved to New Zealand to take up a position as a reporter with the Sport 365 news programme.

Harby-Williams made a brief comeback in New Zealand, playing two seasons with the Auckland Diamonds in New Zealand's national league, the National Bank Cup. At the age of 34 she was selected as the league's most valuable defence player. She announced her retirement at the end of the 2005 season in order to focus on pursuing her television and radio career, but returned to the Diamonds in 2006. She was inducted into the Australian Netball Hall of Fame in 2010.

After returning to Australia in 2013 for commentating for Sky Sports NZ, she starting commentating for Fox Sports in the ANZ Championship. Harby-Williams is also a selector for the Australian National team.

In the 2018 Queen's Birthday Honours Harby-Williams was made a Member of the Order of Australia (AM) for "significant service to netball as a player, national captain, coach, commentator, board member and player's advocate".

In 2025, Harby-Williams is the coach for International All Stars against former Silver Ferns in a one-day, multi-game tournament in Game On.
