= Netball South Australia Premier League =

Netball league in Australia

- Country: Australia
- Region: South Australia
- Divisions: Premier Division; Reserves Division
- Number of clubs: 8
- Level on pyramid: 3
- Current champions: Contax
- Most championships: Contax (24)
- Website: sa.netball.com.au

The Netball South Australia Premier League, also referred to as the Netball SA Premier League is a state netball league, organised by Netball South Australia. On a national level, the league is effectively a third level league, below Suncorp Super Netball and the Australian Netball League. Between 2008 and 2014, when sponsored by Subway the league was known as the Subway Cup. Between 2015 and 2017, when it was sponsored by Nine News, it was known as the Nine News Netball Cup. Previous sponsors include Dairy Farmers and Farmers Union. During the 2010s the league has been dominated by two clubs, Contax and Matrics, who between them have won every Premier Division grand final since 2010.

== History ==
=== Contax and Garville rivalry ===
In 1988, with a team that included Michelle den Dekker and Kathryn Harby, Contax won their fourth premiership, defeating Garville in the grand final. This marked the beginning a rivalry between Contax and Garville. Between 1986 and 1996 Contax and Garville contested every state league grand final. The rivalry saw the two clubs compete in nine consecutive state league grand finals, plus one Mobil Super League final, with both clubs winning five finals each. With a team that included Harby and Julie Nykiel, a former Australia women's basketball international, Contax won their fifth and sixth premierships in 1990 and 1991. Between 1992 and 1995 Garville won four successive state league grand finals before, a Contax team featuring Jacqui Delaney won the club's seventh premiership in 1996.

=== Premier League era ===
In 2011 the state league was renamed the Premier League. Since this time, Contax main rival has been Matrics. Between them, Contax and Matrics played in every Premier League grand final during the decade winning 5 Premierships each.

== Representative team ==
The Australian Netball League team Southern Force are effectively the representative team of the Netball South Australia Premier League. They are one of two teams that represent Netball South Australia in senior or national leagues. Their senior team, Adelaide Thunderbirds, has represented Netball South Australia in both the ANZ Championship and Suncorp Super Netball. Southern Force are also effectively the reserve team of Thunderbirds.

== Clubs ==
The 2024 league features eight clubs, entering teams in two divisions – the Premier Division and Reserves Division.

Team	Colours	Home venue/base	Debut season	Championships	
Team	Colours	Home venue/base	Debut season	Total	Years
Contax		Woodville	1952	24	1952, 1970, 1986, 1988, 1990, 1991, 1996, 2000, 2002, 2003, 2004, 2006, 2008, 2010, 2012, 2013, 2015, 2017, 2018, 2021, 2023, 2024, 2025, 2026
Garville		Woodville Gardens/Woodville	1952	11	1962, 1963, 1964, 1965, 1966, 1967, 1989, 1992, 1993, 1994, 1995
Matrics		Elizabeth	1972	8	1997, 2005, 2011, 2014, 2016, 2019, 2020, 2022
Metro Jets		Woodville	2010	0	–
Norwood (Newtown Jaguars 1989-2025)		Paradise	1989	0	–
Oakdale		Oaklands Park/Warradale	1962	1	2009
South Adelaide		Blackwood	1999	0	–
Tango		Tea Tree Gully	1951	11	1951, 1957, 1958, 1968, 1969, 1972, 1973, 1981, 1983, 1984, 1985
Walkerville		Walkerville	2026	0	–

== Grand finals ==
Season	Winners	Score	Runners up	Venue
1951	Tango			
1952	Contax		Tango	
1957	Tango			
1958	Tango			
1962	Garville			
1963	Garville			
1964	Garville			
1965	Garville			
1966	Garville			
1967	Garville			
1968	Tango			
1969	Tango			
1970	Contax		Garville	
1972	Tango			
1973	Tango		Contax	
1981	Tango			
1982				
1983	Tango			
1984	Tango		Contax	
1985	Tango			
1986	Contax		Tango	
1987				
1988	Contax		Garville	Apollo Stadium
1989	Garville		Contax	
1990	Contax		Garville	Apollo Stadium
1991	Contax		Garville	
1992	Garville		Contax	
1993	Garville		Contax	
1994	Garville		Contax	
1995	Garville		Contax	
1996	Contax		Garville	
1997	Matrics		Contax	
1999			Contax	
2000	Contax		Australian Institute of Sport	
2001	Australian Institute of Sport		Matrics	
2002	Contax			
2003	Contax			
2004	Contax			
2005	Matrics		Contax	
2006	Contax			
2007			Contax	
2008	Contax			
2009	Oakdale		Contax	
2010	Contax		Matrics	
2011	Matrics		Newton Jaguars	
2012	Contax		Phoenix	
2013	Contax	34–33	Matrics	Netball SA Stadium
2014	Matrics	54–44	Garville	Netball SA Stadium
2015	Contax	51–39	Matrics	Netball SA Stadium
2016	Matrics	49–47	Contax	Netball SA Stadium
2017	Contax	59–50	Matrics	Netball SA Stadium
2018	Contax	73–39	Garville	
2019	Matrics	55–47	Contax	Priceline Stadium
2020	Matrics	60–56	Contax	Priceline Stadium
2021	Contax	56-55	Matrics	Netball SA Stadium
2022	Matrics	64-53	Contax	Netball SA Stadium
2023	Contax	53-41	Matrics	Netball SA Stadium
2024	Contax	64-63	South Adelaide	Netball SA Stadium
2025	Contax	58-53	Garville	Netball SA Stadium
2026	Contax	50-35	Oakdale	Netball SA Stadium

== Sponsorship ==
Sponsors	Seasons
Dairy Farmers	2000
Farmers Union	2001
Subway	2008–2014
Nine News	2015–2017
