= 2011 Waikato Bay of Plenty Magic season =

WBoP Magic season

Waikato Bay of Plenty Magic
- 2011 season
- Head coach: Noeline Taurua
- Asst. coach: Margaret Foster
- Captain: Laura Langman
- Main venue: Mystery Creek Events Centre

Season results
- Wins–losses: 10–5
- Regular season: 2nd
- Finals placing: 3rd
- Team colours

Waikato Bay of Plenty Magic seasons
- ← 2010 2012 →

The 2011 Waikato Bay of Plenty Magic season saw Waikato Bay of Plenty Magic compete in the 2011 ANZ Championship. With a team coached by Noeline Taurua and captained by Laura Langman, Magic finished the regular season second behind Queensland Firebirds. They subsequently lost to Firebirds in the major semi-final and to Northern Mystics in the preliminary final. Magic finished the season third overall.

The 2011 season was the last season Magic played their Hamilton home games at the Mystery Creek Events Centre. From 2012, their Hamilton games will be played at Claudelands Arena.

== Players ==
=== Player movements ===
▲ Gains	▼ Losses
Jamilah Gupwell (Central Pulse); Erena Mikaere Promoted from training squad; Julianna Naoupu (Southern Steel); Sulu Tone-Fitzpatrick (Northern Mystics); Arahi Wall Returning player (2006)	Jodi Brown Unavailable; Amy Christophers Not signed; Tanya Lund Not signed; Elias Shadrock Not signed; Kahurangi Waititi Retired

=== Roster ===
2011 Waikato Bay of Plenty Magic roster
Players
Coaching staff

Nat.	Name	Position(s)	DoB	Height
(New Zealand)	Jamilah Gupwell	GA, WA, GS	7 July 1986 (aged 24)	1.75 m (5 ft 9 in)
(New Zealand)	Irene van Dyk	GS, GA	21 June 1972 (aged 38)	1.90 m (6 ft 3 in)
(New Zealand)	Laura Langman (c)	C, WD	16 April 1986 (aged 24)	1.73 m (5 ft 8 in)
(New Zealand)	Erena Mikaere	GD, GK	9 July 1988 (aged 22)	1.93 m (6 ft 4 in)
(New Zealand)	Julianna Naoupu	GA, GS	1 March 1990 (aged 20)	1.76 m (5 ft 9 in)
(Australia)	Peta Scholz	WD, C, GD	17 January 1976 (aged 35)	1.80 m (5 ft 11 in)
(Samoa)	Frances Solia	C, WA	20 September 1976 (aged 34)	1.69 m (5 ft 7 in)
(New Zealand)	Jodi Tod	GD, WD, GK	4 February 1981 (aged 30)	1.81 m (5 ft 11 in)
(New Zealand)	Sulu Tone-Fitzpatrick	GD, GK	20 August 1992 (aged 18)	1.88 m (6 ft 2 in)
(New Zealand)	Jessica Tuki	GK, WA	28 October 1987 (aged 23)	1.85 m (6 ft 1 in)
(New Zealand)	Arahi Wall	GS, GA	30 January 1985 (aged 26)	1.85 m (6 ft 1 in)
(New Zealand)	Casey Williams	GD, GK	19 June 1985 (aged 25)	1.88 m (6 ft 2 in)

Head coach

- (New Zealand) Noeline Taurua

Assistant coach

- (New Zealand) Margaret Foster

Manager: Belinda Muller
Physiotherapist:
Fiona Goddard
Trainer: Lynne O'Malley

Notes

- (c) – Captain
- (cc) – Co-captain
- (vc) – Vice-captain
- – Injury / maternity leave
- (TRP) – Temporary Replacement Player

== Pre-season ==
Waikato Bay of Plenty Magic and Northern Mystics played a five-quarter match during pre-season.

6 February	Waikato Bay of Plenty Magic	62–54	Northern Mystics	Te Awamutu

== Regular season ==
=== Fixtures and results ===
Round 1

Waikato Bay of Plenty Magic received a bye.

Round 2

Sun 20 February	Waikato Bay of Plenty Magic	51 – 36	Southern Steel	Energy Events Centre
18:20 (UTC+13)	Jamilah Gupwell 3/6 (50%); Julianna Naoupu 12/17 (71%); Irene van Dyk 36/40 (90%)	Report; Stats	Paula Griffin 20/24 (83%); Daneka Wipiiti 16/23 (70%)

Round 3

Thu 24 February	Northern Mystics	39 – 45	Waikato Bay of Plenty Magic	Trusts Stadium
19:40 (UTC+13)	Cathrine Latu 22/27 (81%); Maria Tutaia 17/27 (63%)	Report; Stats	Jamilah Gupwell 9/13 (69%); Julianna Naoupu 7/12 (58%); Irene van Dyk 29/33 (88%)

Mon 28 February	Central Pulse	44 – 46	Waikato Bay of Plenty Magic	TSB Bank Arena
19:40 (UTC+13)	Amber Bellringer 17/27 (63%); Caitlin Thwaites 27/33 (82%)	Report; Stats	Jamilah Gupwell 5/7 (71%); Julianna Naoupu 9/11 (82%); Irene van Dyk 32/36 (89%)

Round 4

Mon 7 March	Canterbury Tactix	56 – 63	Waikato Bay of Plenty Magic	Energy Events Centre ^{(Note 1)}
19:40 (UTC+13)	Ellen Halpenny 11/17 (65%); Anna Thompson 15/18 (83%); Donna Wilkins 30/35 (86%)	Q4: 47–47; Report; Stats	Julianna Naoupu 37/40 (93%); Irene van Dyk 26/27 (96%)

Round 5

Sun 13 March	Waikato Bay of Plenty Magic	46 – 47	Northern Mystics	Mystery Creek Events Centre
18:20 (UTC+13)	Julianna Naoupu 20/31 (65%); Irene van Dyk 26/31 (84%)	Report; Stats	Megan Dehn 3/5 (60%); Cathrine Latu 23/26 (88%); Maria Tutaia 21/23 (91%)

Round 6

Mon 21 March	Waikato Bay of Plenty Magic	53 – 41	Melbourne Vixens	Mystery Creek Events Centre
19:40 (UTC+13)	Julianna Naoupu 22/27 (81%); Irene van Dyk 31/36 (86%)	Report; Stats	Kate Beveridge 4/5 (80%); Tegan Caldwell 13/20 (65%); Sharelle McMahon 24/27 (89%)

Round 7

Mon 28 March	West Coast Fever	41 – 42	Waikato Bay of Plenty Magic	Challenge Stadium
19:10 (UTC+8)	Caitlin Bassett 23/33 (70%); Ashlee Howard 13/16 (81%); Leah Shoard 5/10 (50%)	Report; Stats	Julianna Naoupu 17/23 (74%); Irene van Dyk 25/26 (96%)

Round 8

Mon 4 April	Queensland Firebirds	53 – 49	Waikato Bay of Plenty Magic	Brisbane Convention and Exhibition Centre
19:40 (UTC+10)	Romelda Aiken 36/39 (92%); Natalie Medhurst 17/21 (81%)	Report; Stats	Julianna Naoupu 24/29 (83%); Irene van Dyk 25/26 (96%)

Round 9

Mon 11 April	Waikato Bay of Plenty Magic	46 – 53	New South Wales Swifts	Queen Elizabeth Youth Centre
19:40 (UTC+12)	Irene van Dyk 28/30 (93%); Jamilah Gupwell 10/13 (77%); Julianna Naoupu 8/8 (100%)	Report; Stats	Catherine Cox 31/36 (86%); Amorette Wild 3/4 (75%); Susan Pratley 19/26 (73%)

Round 10

Thu 14 April	Waikato Bay of Plenty Magic	53 – 49	Canterbury Tactix	Energy Events Centre
19:40 (UTC+12)	Jamilah Gupwell 4/5 (80%); Julianna Naoupu 14/19 (74%); Irene van Dyk 35/36 (97%)	Report; Stats	Anna Thompson 19/24 (79%); Donna Wilkins 30/30 (100%)

Sun 17 April	Southern Steel	33 – 38	Waikato Bay of Plenty Magic	Invercargill ILT Velodrome
18:20 (UTC+12)	Paula Griffin 24/26 (92%); Daneka Wipiiti 9/14 (64%)	Report; Stats	Jamilah Gupwell 3/7 (43%); Julianna Naoupu 6/11 (55%); Irene van Dyk 29/30 (97%)

Round 11

Sun 24 April	Adelaide Thunderbirds	36 – 55	Waikato Bay of Plenty Magic	ETSA Park
13:20 (UTC+9:30)	Erin Bell 22/26 (85%); Bianca Giteau 8/12 (67%); Carla Borrego 6/10 (60%)	Report; Stats	Irene van Dyk 43/47 (91%); Jamilah Gupwell 0/1 (0%); Julianna Naoupu 12/17 (71%)

Round 12

Mon 2 May	Waikato Bay of Plenty Magic	60 – 50	Central Pulse	Taupo Events Centre
19:40 (UTC+12)	Jamilah Gupwell 0/1 (0%); Julianna Naoupu 22/25 (88%); Irene van Dyk 37/39 (95%); Arahi Wall 1/2 (50%)	Report; Stats	Amber Bellringer 9/12 (75%); Alanah Cassidy 1/4 (25%); Brooke Leaver 0/1 (0%); Caitlin Thwaites 40/46 (87%)

Notes

- ^1 The Round 4 match between Canterbury Tactix and Waikato Bay of Plenty Magic was originally scheduled to be played in Christchurch. However following the 2011 Christchurch earthquake, the match was moved to Rotorua. It was still regarded as a "home" match for Tactix.

=== Final table ===
2011 ANZ Championship ladder
Pos	Team	Pld	W	L	GF	GA	GD	G%	Pts
1	Queensland Firebirds	13	13	0	758	587	171	129.13	26
2	Waikato Bay of Plenty Magic	13	10	3	647	578	69	111.94	20
3	New South Wales Swifts	13	9	4	677	606	71	111.72	18
4	Northern Mystics	13	9	4	684	619	65	110.5	18
5	Melbourne Vixens	13	8	5	664	610	54	108.85	16
6	Adelaide Thunderbirds	13	5	8	662	737	-75	89.82	10
7	Southern Steel	13	4	9	533	594	-61	89.73	8
8	Central Pulse	13	3	10	599	683	-84	87.7	6
9	West Coast Fever	13	3	10	646	754	-108	85.68	6
10	Canterbury Tactix	13	1	12	621	723	-102	85.89	2
Updated 8 March 2021

Qualified for Major semi-final
Qualified for Minor semi-final

- Pld = Games played
- W = Win (2 points)
- L = Loss (0 points)
- GF = Goals For
- GA = Goals Against
- GD = Goals Difference (= GF−GA)
- G% = Goal percentage (= 100 × GF/GA)

Pts = Points

== Finals ==
Semifinals
9 May – Gold Coast
Queensland Firebirds	50
Waikato Bay of Plenty Magic	39
8 May – Sydney
New South Wales Swifts	44
Northern Mystics	49

Preliminary final
15 May – Hamilton
Waikato Bay of Plenty Magic	42
Northern Mystics	43

Grand final
22 May – Brisbane
Queensland Firebirds	57
Northern Mystics	44

=== Major semifinal ===
Monday 9 May; 19:40 (UTC+10)	Report; Stats	Queensland Firebirds	50–39	Waikato Bay of Plenty Magic	Gold Coast Convention and Exhibition Centre	TEN; SKYSport
Monday 9 May; 19:40 (UTC+10)	Report; Stats	Scoring by quarter: 12–8, 11-8, 16–10, 11-13			Gold Coast Convention and Exhibition Centre	TEN; SKYSport
Monday 9 May; 19:40 (UTC+10)	Report; Stats	Romelda Aiken 29/33 (88%); Natalie Medhurst 21/27 (78%)		Irene van Dyk 17/19 (89%); Jamilah Gupwell 16/18 (89%); Julianna Naoupu 6/8 (75%)	Gold Coast Convention and Exhibition Centre	TEN; SKYSport

=== Preliminary final ===
Sunday 15 May; 18:20 (UTC+12)	Report; Stats	Waikato Bay of Plenty Magic	42–43	Northern Mystics	Mystery Creek Events Centre	TEN; SKYSport
Sunday 15 May; 18:20 (UTC+12)	Report; Stats	Scoring by quarter: 13–9, 7-16, 12–10, 10-8			Mystery Creek Events Centre	TEN; SKYSport
Sunday 15 May; 18:20 (UTC+12)	Report; Stats	Irene van Dyk 27/28 (96%); Julianna Naoupu 14/19 (74%); Jamilah Gupwell 1/3 (33%)		Cathrine Latu 15/17 (88%); Maria Tutaia 28/30 (93%)	Mystery Creek Events Centre	TEN; SKYSport

== Statistics ==
Player	GS	GA	G%	A	R	CPR	I	D	P	T
Jamilah Gupwell	51	74	68.9	18	3	60	1	1	20	12
Laura Langman	0	0	0	148	0	0	16	20	91	42
Erena Mikaere	0	0	0	0	0	0	0	0	0	0
Julianna Naoupu	230	297	77.4	70	2	149	3	1	59	32
Peta Scholz	0	0	0	2	0	87	15	47	115	15
Frances Solia	0	0	0	32	0	72	0	3	31	16
Jodi Tod	0	0	0	3	10	41	9	39	73	8
Sulu Tone-Fitzpatrick	0	0	0	1	8	12	15	30	92	8
Jessica Tuki	0	0	0	121	1	191	8	13	55	37
Irene van Dyk	446	485	92.0	18	37	5	2	10	41	38
Arahi Wall	1	2	50.0	0	0	0	0	0	0	0
Casey Williams	0	0	0	2	40	45	33	70	222	23

Statistics key
GS	Goals scored	A	Assists	I	Intercepts
GA	Goal attempts	R	Rebounds	D	Deflections
G%	Goal percentage	CPR	Centre pass receives	P	Penalties
= Competition leader				T	Turnovers conceded
