= 2012 Waikato Bay of Plenty Magic season =

WBoP Magic season

Waikato Bay of Plenty Magic
- 2012 season
- Head coach: Noeline Taurua
- Captain: Laura Langman
- Main venue: TECT Arena

Season results
- Wins–losses: 12–4
- Regular season: 3rd
- Finals placing: 1st
- Team colours

Waikato Bay of Plenty Magic seasons
- ← 2011 2013 →

The 2012 Waikato Bay of Plenty Magic season saw Waikato Bay of Plenty Magic compete in the 2012 ANZ Championship. With a team coached by Noeline Taurua, captained by Laura Langman and featuring Leana de Bruin, Irene van Dyk, Julianna Naoupu and Casey Williams, Magic eventually won the premiership. They became the fifth team in as many seasons to win the title. Magic lost their first four matches. However, they subsequently won 12 matches in a row to finish third during the regular season and champions overall. In the minor semi-final they defeated Adelaide Thunderbirds and in the preliminary final they defeated Northern Mystics after extra time. In the grand final they defeated Melbourne Vixens 41–38. As a result, they became the first, and only, New Zealand team to win the Championship. They were also the first and only team to start the season with four defeats and win the title and the first and only team to finish third in the regular season and win the title.

== Players ==
=== Player movements ===
Summary of 2012 player movements
▲ Gains	▼ Losses
Leana de Bruin (Southern Steel); Elias Shadrock; Khao Watts (Southern Force/SASI)	Jamilah Gupwell (Central Pulse); Peta Scholz; Jodi Tod

=== Squad ===
2012 Waikato Bay of Plenty Magic roster
Players
Coaching staff

Nat.	Name	Position(s)	DoB	Height
(New Zealand)	Leana de Bruin	GD, GK	9 July 1977 (aged 34)	1.90 m (6 ft 3 in)
(New Zealand)	Irene van Dyk	GS, GA	21 June 1972 (aged 39)	1.90 m (6 ft 3 in)
(New Zealand)	Laura Langman (c)	C, WD	16 April 1986 (aged 25)	1.73 m (5 ft 8 in)
(New Zealand)	Erena Mikaere	GD, GK	9 July 1988 (aged 23)	1.93 m (6 ft 4 in)
(New Zealand)	Julianna Naoupu	GA, GS	1 March 1990 (aged 22)	1.76 m (5 ft 9 in)
(New Zealand)	Elias Shadrock	WA, C, WD	2 July 1990 (aged 21)	1.78 m (5 ft 10 in)
(Samoa)	Frances Solia	C, WA	20 September 1976 (aged 35)	1.69 m (5 ft 7 in)
(New Zealand)	Sulu Tone-Fitzpatrick	GD, GK	20 August 1992 (aged 19)	1.88 m (6 ft 2 in)
(New Zealand)	Jessica Tuki	GK, WA	28 October 1987 (aged 24)	1.85 m (6 ft 1 in)
(New Zealand)	Jessica Waitapu	GS, GA		–
(New Zealand)	Arahi Wall	GS, GA	30 January 1985 (aged 27)	1.85 m (6 ft 1 in)
(Australia)	Khao Watts	WD		–
(New Zealand)	Casey Williams	GD, GK	19 June 1985 (aged 26)	1.88 m (6 ft 2 in)

Head coach

- (New Zealand) Noeline Taurua

Notes

- (c) – Captain
- (cc) – Co-captain
- (vc) – Vice-captain
- – Injury / maternity leave
- (TRP) – Temporary Replacement Player

== Tauranga Pre-Season Tournament ==
On 2, 3 and 4 March, Waikato Bay of Plenty Magic hosted a pre-season tournament at the TECT Arena in Tauranga. For the first time since 2008, all ten ANZ Championship teams competed at the same tournament. Magic finished the tournament in third place. The tournament was won by Queensland Firebirds who defeated Melbourne Vixens 50–30 in the final.

3rd/4th place play-off

Sunday 4 March	Waikato Bay of Plenty Magic	51–36	Northern Mystics	TECT Arena

== Regular season ==
=== Fixtures and results ===
Round 1

Monday 2 April	Southern Steel	49 – 47	Waikato Bay of Plenty Magic	Stadium Southland
19:40 (UTC+12:00)	Jodi Brown 17/24 (71%); Donna Wilkins 32/35 (91%)	Report; Stats	Julianna Naoupu 12/18 (67%); Irene van Dyk 30/30 (100%); Jess Waitapu 5/5 (100%)

Round 2

Sunday 8 April	Waikato Bay of Plenty Magic	41 – 47	Northern Mystics	Claudelands Arena
19:20 (UTC+12:00)	Julianna Naoupu 23/29 (79%); Irene van Dyk 17/21 (81%); Arahi Wall 1/2 (50%)	Stats	Cathrine Latu 16/17 (94%); Maria Tutaia 31/39 (79%)

Round 3

Monday 16 April	New South Wales Swifts	49 – 47	Waikato Bay of Plenty Magic	Sydney Olympic Park Sports Centre
19:40 (UTC+10:00)	Carla Dziwoki 23/25 (92%); Susan Pratley 26/31 (84%)	Stats	Julianna Naoupu 23/28 (82%); Irene van Dyk 24/25 (96%)	Attendance: 3,665

Round 4

Sunday 22 April	Melbourne Vixens	40 – 39	Waikato Bay of Plenty Magic	Hisense Arena
12:10 (UTC+10:00)	Kate Beveridge 18/23 (78%); Tegan Caldwell 17/21 (81%); Karyn Howarth 5/7 (71%)	Stats	Julianna Naoupu 9/17 (53%); Irene van Dyk 25/30 (83%); Jess Waitapu 5/7 (71%)

Round 5

Monday 30 April	Waikato Bay of Plenty Magic	61 – 52	Canterbury Tactix	Energy Events Centre
19:40 (UTC+12:00)	Julianna Naoupu 28/35 (80%); Irene van Dyk 33/33 (100%)	Stats	Joanne Harten 49/58 (84%); Anna Thompson 3/8 (38%)

Round 6

Sunday 6 May	Waikato Bay of Plenty Magic	65 – 49	West Coast Fever	TECT Arena
19:20 (UTC+12:00)	Julianna Naoupu 28/38 (74%); Irene van Dyk 37/39 (95%)	Stats	Caitlin Bassett 30/34 (88%); Catherine Cox 19/23 (83%)

Round 7

Monday 14 May	Central Pulse	46 – 56	Waikato Bay of Plenty Magic	Te Rauparaha Arena
19:40 (UTC+12:00)	Amber Bellringer 2/4 (50%); Paula Griffin 9/17 (53%); Jamilah Gupwell 1/2 (50%); Caitlin Thwaites 34/42 (81%)	Stats	Julianna Naoupu 21/28 (75%); Irene van Dyk 35/37 (95%)

Round 8

Saturday 19 May	Canterbury Tactix	42 – 65	Waikato Bay of Plenty Magic	CBS Canterbury Arena
16:20 (UTC+12:00)	Ellen Halpenny 22/31 (71%); Joanne Harten 19/24 (79%); Anna Thompson 1/2 (50%)	Stats	Julianna Naoupu 22/29 (76%); Irene van Dyk 43/44 (98%)

Round 9

Waikato Bay of Plenty Magic received a bye.

Round 10

Monday 4 June	Waikato Bay of Plenty Magic	66 – 47	Southern Steel	Claudelands Arena
19:40 (UTC+12:00)	Julianna Naoupu 27; Irene van Dyk 39	Report	Jodi Brown 26; Donna Wilkins 12; Te Paea Selby-Rickit 9

Round 11

Sunday 10 June	Waikato Bay of Plenty Magic	52 – 42	Central Pulse	TECT Arena
19:20 (UTC+12:00)	Julianna Naoupu 18/23 (78%); Irene van Dyk 34/35 (97%)	Report	Paula Griffin 15/21 (71%); Caitlin Thwaites 27/34 (79%)

Round 12

Sunday 17 June	Northern Mystics	46 – 48	Waikato Bay of Plenty Magic	Trusts Stadium
19:20 (UTC+12:00)		Report

Round 13

Saturday 23 June	Waikato Bay of Plenty Magic	59 – 42	Adelaide Thunderbirds	TECT Arena
16:20 (UTC+12:00)	Julianna Naoupu 18/23 (78%); Irene van Dyk 41/42 (98%)	Report	Erin Bell; Carla Borrego

Round 14

Monday 2 July	Waikato Bay of Plenty Magic	53 – 43	Queensland Firebirds	Claudelands Arena
19:40 (UTC+12:00)		Report

=== Final table ===
2012 ANZ Championship ladder
Pos	Team	Pld	W	L	GF	GA	GD	G%	Pts
1	Melbourne Vixens	13	10	3	645	569	76	113.36	20
2	Northern Mystics	13	10	3	667	633	34	105.37	20
3	Waikato Bay of Plenty Magic	13	9	4	699	594	105	117.68	18
4	Adelaide Thunderbirds	13	9	4	670	589	81	113.75	18
5	New South Wales Swifts	13	8	5	624	638	-14	97.81	16
6	Queensland Firebirds	13	7	6	686	640	46	107.19	14
7	Central Pulse	13	5	8	585	626	-41	93.45	10
8	West Coast Fever	13	3	10	608	673	-65	90.34	6
9	Southern Steel	13	2	11	639	728	-89	87.77	4
10	Canterbury Tactix	13	2	11	634	767	-133	82.66	4
Updated 28 March 2021

Qualified for Major semi-final
Qualified for Minor semi-final

- Pld = Games played
- W = Win (2 points)
- L = Loss (0 points)
- GF = Goals For
- GA = Goals Against
- GD = Goals Difference (= GF−GA)
- G% = Goal percentage (= 100 × GF/GA)

Pts = Points

== Finals ==
Semifinals
8 July – Rod Laver Arena
Melbourne Vixens	56
Northern Mystics	50
9 July – Claudelands Arena
Waikato Bay of Plenty Magic	49
Adelaide Thunderbirds	48

Preliminary final
16 July – Trusts Stadium
Northern Mystics	48
Waikato Bay of Plenty Magic	57

Grand final
22 July – Hisense Arena
Melbourne Vixens	38
Waikato Bay of Plenty Magic	41

=== Minor semi-final ===
Monday 9 July; 19:20 (UTC+12)	Stats	Waikato Bay of Plenty Magic	49–48	Adelaide Thunderbirds	Claudelands Arena
Monday 9 July; 19:20 (UTC+12)	Stats	Scoring by quarter: 15-7, 8-19, 15-13, 11-9			Claudelands Arena
Monday 9 July; 19:20 (UTC+12)	Stats	Irene van Dyk 28/28 (100%); Julianna Naoupu 21/23 (91%)		Erin Bell 26/29 (90%); Carla Borrego 22/30 (73%)	Claudelands Arena

=== Preliminary final ===
Monday 16 July; 19:40 (UTC+12)	Stats	Northern Mystics	48–57	Waikato Bay of Plenty Magic	ET	Trusts Stadium
Monday 16 July; 19:40 (UTC+12)	Stats	Scoring by quarter: 12-12, 11-12, 13-10, 8-10, ET: 4-13			ET	Trusts Stadium
Monday 16 July; 19:40 (UTC+12)	Stats	Cathrine Latu 23/23 (100%); Maria Tutaia 25/35 (71%)		Irene van Dyk 35/40 (88%); Julianna Naoupu 22/34 (65%)	ET	Trusts Stadium

=== Grand final ===
Sunday 22 July; 14:30 (UTC+10)	Melbourne Vixens	38–41	Waikato Bay of Plenty Magic	Hisense Arena; Attendance: 10,500
Sunday 22 July; 14:30 (UTC+10)	Scoring by quarter: 8-7, 14-11, 9-10, 7-13			Hisense Arena; Attendance: 10,500
Sunday 22 July; 14:30 (UTC+10)	Karyn Howarth 22/29 (76%); Tegan Caldwell 16/26 (62%)		Irene van Dyk 25/26 (96%); Julianna Naoupu 16/24 (67%)	Hisense Arena; Attendance: 10,500

== Award winners ==
=== ANZ Championship awards ===
Award	Winner
ANZ Championship Most Valuable Player	(New Zealand) Laura Langman ^{(Note 1)}
ANZ Championship Grand Final MVP	(New Zealand) Leana de Bruin
Best Young Player	(New Zealand) Julianna Naoupu

Notes

- ^1 Laura Langman shared the MVP Award with Temepara George (Northern Mystics)

=== All Stars ===
Position	Player
GS	(New Zealand) Irene van Dyk
C	(New Zealand) Laura Langman
GD	(New Zealand) Casey Williams
Coach	(New Zealand) Noeline Taurua
