= 2011 Queensland Firebirds season =

Queensland Firebirds season

Queensland Firebirds
- 2011 season
- Head coach: Roselee Jencke
- Asst. coach: Tracey Robinson
- Manager: Nannette Rigoni
- Captain: Lauren Nourse
- Vice-captain: Laura Geitz
- Main venue: Brisbane Convention and Exhibition Centre

Season results
- Wins–losses: 15–0
- Regular season: 1st
- Finals placing: 1st
- Team colours

Queensland Firebirds seasons
- ← 2010 2012 →

The 2011 Mission Queensland Firebirds season saw Queensland Firebirds compete in the 2011 ANZ Championship. With a team coached by Roselee Jencke, captained by Lauren Nourse and featuring Romelda Aiken, Laura Geitz, Clare McMeniman and Natalie Medhurst, Firebirds finished the season undefeated. They became the first team in the history of the ANZ Championship to go through the regular season and the playoffs without losing a single match. In the major semi-final, Firebirds defeated Waikato Bay of Plenty Magic and in the grand final they defeated Northern Mystics, winning their first premiership. This marked the beginning of a golden age for Firebirds. Between 2011 and 2016, Jencke guided them to five grand finals and three premierships.

== Players ==
=== Player movements ===
Summary of 2011 player movements
▲ Gains	▼ Losses
Candice Adams; Elissa Macleod; April Letton (NNSW Waratahs); Chelsea Pitman (Canterbury Tactix); Ameliaranne Wells (Queensland Fusion)	Alissa Castrisos; Sophie Croft (Queensland Fusion); Laura Scherian (Queensland Fusion); Sarah Wall (Melbourne Vixens)

=== 2011 roster ===
2011 Queensland Firebirds roster
Players
Coaching staff

Nat.	Name	Position(s)	DoB	Height
(Australia)	Candice Adams	GA, GS, WA	23 November 1988 (aged 22)	1.80 m (5 ft 11 in)
(Jamaica)	Romelda Aiken	GS, GA	19 November 1988 (aged 22)	1.96 m (6 ft 5 in)
(Australia)	Laura Geitz (vc)	GK, GD	4 November 1987 (aged 23)	1.85 m (6 ft 1 in)
(Australia)	April Letton (TRP)	GK, GD	19 April 1990 (aged 20)	1.85 m (6 ft 1 in)
(Australia)	Elissa Macleod	C, WD, WA	19 March 1984 (aged 26)	1.73 m (5 ft 8 in)
(Australia)	Clare McMeniman	GD, WD	11 July 1985 (aged 25)	1.84 m (6 ft 0 in)
(Australia)	Natalie Medhurst	GA, GS	20 January 1984 (aged 27)	1.78 m (5 ft 10 in)
(Australia)	Lauren Nourse (c) (injured)	WA, C	10 August 1982 (aged 28)	1.78 m (5 ft 10 in)
(Australia)	Chelsea Pitman	GA, WA	8 June 1988 (aged 22)	1.81 m (5 ft 11 in)
(Australia)	Jacqui Russell	C, WA	1 August 1988 (aged 22)	1.75 m (5 ft 9 in)
(Australia)	Amy Steel	GD, GK	7 April 1989 (aged 21)	1.90 m (6 ft 3 in)
(Australia)	Keirra Trompf	WD	16 September 1985 (aged 25)	1.83 m (6 ft 0 in)
(Australia)	Ameliaranne Wells	GS, GA	11 January 1991 (aged 20)	1.86 m (6 ft 1 in)

Head coach

- (Australia) Roselee Jencke

Assistant coach

- (Australia) Tracey Robinson
  Specialist coach:
  (Australia) Nicole Cusack

Manager: Nannette Rigoni
Physiotherapist:
Mark Stokes
Strength and conditioning:
Dirk Spits
High Performance Manager:
Brian Hopley
Sports Physician:
Dr Richard Brown
Dietician:
Kerry Leech
Podiatrist:
Janet Burns

Notes

- (c) – Captain
- (cc) – Co-captain
- (vc) – Vice-captain
- – Injury / maternity leave
- (TRP) – Temporary Replacement Player

Notes

- ^1 Candice Adams, Jacqui Russell and Ameliaranne Wells were all members of the 2011 Queensland Fusion squad.

=== Gold medallists ===
Laura Geitz, Natalie Medhurst and Chelsea Pitman were all members of the Australia team that won the gold medal at the 2011 World Netball Championships.

== Pre-season ==
Between 28 and 30 January, Firebirds participated in the Queenstown Pre-Season Tournament, hosted by Southern Steel. They played five matches against Steel, Canterbury Tactix and Central Pulse. Firebirds won the tournament, defeating Pulse in the final.

Final

30 January	Queensland Firebirds	50–46	Central Pulse	Queenstown Events Centre

== Regular season ==
=== Fixtures and results ===
Round 1

Queensland Firebirds received a bye.

Round 2

Mon 21 February	Queensland Firebirds	51 – 48	New South Wales Swifts	Brisbane Convention and Exhibition Centre
18:40 (UTC+10)	Romelda Aiken 28/37 (76%); Natalie Medhurst 23/26 (88%)	Stats	Catherine Cox 27/34 (79%); Susan Pratley 21/25 (84%)

Round 3

Sat 26 February	Queensland Firebirds	64 – 41	Adelaide Thunderbirds	Brisbane Convention and Exhibition Centre
13:20 (UTC+10)	Romelda Aiken 50/54 (93%); Natalie Medhurst 13/18 (72%); Chelsea Pitman 1/3 (33%)	Stats	Erin Bell 6/10 (60%); Carla Borrego 30/34 (88%); Bianca Giteau 5/6 (83%)

Mon 28 February	West Coast Fever	38 – 62	Queensland Firebirds	Challenge Stadium
19:10 (UTC+8)	Caitlin Bassett 30/35 (86%); Ashlee Howard 3/3 (100%); Leah Shoard 5/11 (45%)	Stats	Romelda Aiken 20/25 (80%); Natalie Medhurst 39/45 (87%); Ameliaranne Wells 3/4 (75%)

Round 4

Sun 6 March	Queensland Firebirds	51 – 36	Southern Steel	Brisbane Convention and Exhibition Centre
13:20 (UTC+10)	Romelda Aiken 30/36 (83%); Natalie Medhurst 21/24 (88%)	Stats	Paula Griffin 15/22 (68%); Daneka Wipiiti 21/26 (81%)

Round 5

Sun 13 March	Adelaide Thunderbirds	42 – 64	Queensland Firebirds	ETSA Park
13:50 (UTC+10:30)	Erin Bell 31/34 (91%); Carla Borrego 2/2 (100%); Bianca Giteau 6/11 (55%); Cody Lange 3/5 (60%)	Stats	Romelda Aiken 39/47 (83%); Natalie Medhurst 25/27 (93%)

Round 6

Sun 20 March	New South Wales Swifts	53 – 57	Queensland Firebirds	Sydney Olympic Park Sports Centre
14:20 (UTC+11)	Catherine Cox 31/36 (86%); Susan Pratley 22/25 (88%)	Stats	Romelda Aiken 37/43 (86%); Natalie Medhurst 20/25 (80%)

Round 7

Sat 26 March	Northern Mystics	52 – 61	Queensland Firebirds	Trusts Stadium
16:20 (UTC+13)	Cathrine Latu 19/19 (100%); Maria Tutaia 33/38 (87%)	Stats	Romelda Aiken 38/43 (88%); Natalie Medhurst 23/26 (88%)

Round 8

Thu 31 March	Melbourne Vixens	42 – 52	Queensland Firebirds	State Netball and Hockey Centre
19:40 (UTC+11)	Kate Beveridge 15/26 (58%); Kathleen Knott 16/19 (84%); Sharelle McMahon 11/14 (79%)	Stats	Romelda Aiken 31/38 (82%); Natalie Medhurst 21/27 (78%)

Mon 4 April	Queensland Firebirds	53 – 49	Waikato Bay of Plenty Magic	Brisbane Convention and Exhibition Centre
19:40 (UTC+10)	Romelda Aiken 36/39 (92%); Natalie Medhurst 17/21 (81%)	Stats	Julianna Naoupu 24/29 (83%); Irene van Dyk 25/26 (96%)

Round 9

Sun 10 April	Central Pulse	44 – 61	Queensland Firebirds	Te Rauparaha Arena
18:20 (UTC+12)	Caitlin Thwaites 35/44 (80%); Alanah Cassidy 3/6 (50%); Amber Bellringer 6/11 (55%)	Stats	Romelda Aiken 37/44 (84%); Natalie Medhurst 24/29 (83%)

Round 10

Thu 14 April	Queensland Firebirds	57 – 36	Melbourne Vixens	Brisbane Convention and Exhibition Centre
19:40 (UTC+10)	Romelda Aiken 35/42 (83%); Natalie Medhurst 22/30 (73%); Ameliaranne Wells 0/2 (0%)	Stats	Kate Beveridge 24/32 (75%); Tegan Caldwell 11/17 (65%); Chelsey Tregear 1/2 (50%)

Round 11

Mon 25 April	Queensland Firebirds	56 – 54	West Coast Fever	Brisbane Convention and Exhibition Centre
19:40 (UTC+10)	Romelda Aiken 26/31 (84%); Natalie Medhurst 30/36 (83%)	Stats	Caitlin Bassett 37/39 (95%); Ashlee Howard 4/4 (100%); Leah Shoard 13/17 (76%)

Round 12

Sat 30 April	Canterbury Tactix	52 – 69	Queensland Firebirds	CBS Canterbury Arena
16:20 (UTC+12)	Ellen Halpenny 26/35 (74%); Donna Wilkins 26/35 (74%)	Stats	Romelda Aiken 50/55 (91%); Natalie Medhurst 19/21 (90%)

=== Final table ===
2011 ANZ Championship ladder
Pos	Team	Pld	W	L	GF	GA	GD	G%	Pts
1	Queensland Firebirds	13	13	0	758	587	171	129.13	26
2	Waikato Bay of Plenty Magic	13	10	3	647	578	69	111.94	20
3	New South Wales Swifts	13	9	4	677	606	71	111.72	18
4	Northern Mystics	13	9	4	684	619	65	110.5	18
5	Melbourne Vixens	13	8	5	664	610	54	108.85	16
6	Adelaide Thunderbirds	13	5	8	662	737	-75	89.82	10
7	Southern Steel	13	4	9	533	594	-61	89.73	8
8	Central Pulse	13	3	10	599	683	-84	87.7	6
9	West Coast Fever	13	3	10	646	754	-108	85.68	6
10	Canterbury Tactix	13	1	12	621	723	-102	85.89	2
Updated 8 March 2021

Qualified for Major semi-final
Qualified for Minor semi-final

- Pld = Games played
- W = Win (2 points)
- L = Loss (0 points)
- GF = Goals For
- GA = Goals Against
- GD = Goals Difference (= GF−GA)
- G% = Goal percentage (= 100 × GF/GA)

Pts = Points

== Playoffs ==
Semifinals
9 May – Gold Coast
Queensland Firebirds	50
Waikato Bay of Plenty Magic	39
8 May – Sydney
New South Wales Swifts	44
Northern Mystics	49

Preliminary final
15 May – Hamilton
Waikato Bay of Plenty Magic	42
Northern Mystics	43

Grand final
22 May – Brisbane
Queensland Firebirds	57
Northern Mystics	44

=== Minor semifinal ===
Sunday 8 May; 14:20 (UTC+10)	New South Wales Swifts	44–49	Northern Mystics	Sydney Olympic Park Sports Centre; Umpires: Rachael Ayre (Australia); Mandy Nottingham (New Zealand); Reserve umpire: Jemma Carlton (Australia)	TEN; SKYSport
Sunday 8 May; 14:20 (UTC+10)	Scoring by quarter: 11-15, 9-13, 11–10, 13-11			Sydney Olympic Park Sports Centre; Umpires: Rachael Ayre (Australia); Mandy Nottingham (New Zealand); Reserve umpire: Jemma Carlton (Australia)	TEN; SKYSport
Sunday 8 May; 14:20 (UTC+10)	Catherine Cox 28/36 (78%); Amorette Wild 8/8 (100%); Susan Pratley 8/10 (80%)		Cathrine Latu 25/28 (89%); Maria Tutaia 24/29 (83%)	Sydney Olympic Park Sports Centre; Umpires: Rachael Ayre (Australia); Mandy Nottingham (New Zealand); Reserve umpire: Jemma Carlton (Australia)	TEN; SKYSport

=== Major semifinal ===
Monday 9 May; 19:40 (UTC+10)	Stats	Queensland Firebirds	50–39	Waikato Bay of Plenty Magic	Gold Coast Convention and Exhibition Centre	TEN; SKYSport
Monday 9 May; 19:40 (UTC+10)	Stats	Scoring by quarter: 12–8, 11-8, 16–10, 11-13			Gold Coast Convention and Exhibition Centre	TEN; SKYSport
Monday 9 May; 19:40 (UTC+10)	Stats	Romelda Aiken 29/33 (88%); Natalie Medhurst 21/27 (78%)		Irene van Dyk 17/19 (89%); Jamilah Gupwell 16/18 (89%); Julianna Naoupu 6/8 (75%)	Gold Coast Convention and Exhibition Centre	TEN; SKYSport

=== Preliminary final ===
Sunday 15 May; 18:20 (UTC+12)	Stats	Waikato Bay of Plenty Magic	42–43	Northern Mystics	Mystery Creek Events Centre	TEN; SKYSport
Sunday 15 May; 18:20 (UTC+12)	Stats	Scoring by quarter: 13–9, 7-16, 12–10, 10-8			Mystery Creek Events Centre	TEN; SKYSport
Sunday 15 May; 18:20 (UTC+12)	Stats	Irene van Dyk 27/28 (96%); Julianna Naoupu 14/19 (74%); Jamilah Gupwell 1/3 (33%)		Cathrine Latu 15/17 (88%); Maria Tutaia 28/30 (93%)	Mystery Creek Events Centre	TEN; SKYSport

=== Grand final ===
Sunday 22 May; 14:30 (UTC+10)	Stats	Queensland Firebirds	57–44	Northern Mystics	Brisbane Convention & Exhibition Centre; Attendance: 3,541; Umpires: Sharon Kelly (Australia); Mandy Nottingham (New Zealand); Reserve umpire: Rachael Ayre (Australia)	TEN; SKYSport
Sunday 22 May; 14:30 (UTC+10)	Stats	Scoring by quarter: 12–12, 14–12, 18–8, 13-12			Brisbane Convention & Exhibition Centre; Attendance: 3,541; Umpires: Sharon Kelly (Australia); Mandy Nottingham (New Zealand); Reserve umpire: Rachael Ayre (Australia)	TEN; SKYSport
Sunday 22 May; 14:30 (UTC+10)	Stats	Romelda Aiken 35/40 (88%); Natalie Medhurst 22/24 (92%)		Cathrine Latu 21/21 (100%); Maria Tutaia 23/31 (74%)	Brisbane Convention & Exhibition Centre; Attendance: 3,541; Umpires: Sharon Kelly (Australia); Mandy Nottingham (New Zealand); Reserve umpire: Rachael Ayre (Australia)	TEN; SKYSport

== Statistics ==
Player	GS	GA	G%	A	R	CPR	I	D	P	T
Candice Adams	0	0	0	2	0	3	0	0	1	0
Romelda Aiken	523	607	86.2	24	65	0	1	16	46	59
Laura Geitz	0	0	0	0	41	0	57	92	264	22
April Letton	0	0	0	0	0	1	0	0	2	0
Elissa Macleod	0	0	0	80	0	2	7	7	104	24
Clare McMeniman	0	0	0	0	2	32	4	24	86	7
Natalie Medhurst	338	404	83.7	141	8	256	8	23	39	41
Lauren Nourse	0	0	0	121	0	47	1	2	60	25
Chelsea Pitman	1	3	33.3	101	1	250	5	9	61	25
Jacqui Russell	0	0	0	3	0	0	1	1	7	2
Amy Steel	0	0	0	0	11	55	23	35	149	13
Keirra Trompf	0	0	0	0	1	69	10	31	128	9
Ameliaranne Wells	3	6	50.0	1	0	0	0	0	0	0

Statistics key
GS	Goals scored	A	Assists	I	Intercepts
GA	Goal attempts	R	Rebounds	D	Deflections
G%	Goal percentage	CPR	Centre pass receives	P	Penalties
= Competition leader				T	Turnovers conceded

== Award winners ==
=== ANZ Championship awards ===
Award	Winner
ANZ Championship Most Valuable Player ^{(Note 2)}	Natalie Medhurst
ANZ Championship Grand Final MVP	Romelda Aiken
ANZ Championship All Star Team Member	Romelda Aiken
ANZ Championship All Star Team Coach	Roselee Jencke

=== Australian Netball Awards ===
Award	Winner
Liz Ellis Diamond	Laura Geitz
Australian ANZ Championship Player of the Year	Laura Geitz
Australian ANZ Championship Coach of the Year	Roselee Jencke
Australian Under-21 Player of the Year	April Letton

=== Firebirds awards ===
Award	Winner
Player of the Year	Romelda Aiken
Players' Player	Laura Geitz
Members' Player of the Year	Natalie Medhurst
Spirit Award	Lauren Nourse

Notes

- ^2 Award shared with Leana de Bruin (Southern Steel)
