= 2010 ANZ Championship season =

Netball league season

- League: ANZ Championship
- Sport: Netball
- Duration: 20 March 2010 – 11 July 2010
- Teams: 10
- TV partner(s): One HD; Network 10; Sky Sport (New Zealand); TVNZ
- Champions: Adelaide Thunderbirds
- Runners-up: Waikato Bay of Plenty Magic
- Minor premiers: New South Wales Swifts
- Season MVP: Liana Barrett-Chase (Steel)
- Top scorer: Carla Borrego (Thunderbirds)

ANZ Championship seasons
- ← 2009 2011 →

The 2010 ANZ Championship season was the third season of the ANZ Championship. The 2010 season began on 20 March and concluded on 11 July. New South Wales Swifts went through the entire regular season home and away undefeated, winning 13 consecutive matches and finishing as minor premiers. They were the first team in the history of the ANZ Championship to do this. However they subsequently lost both the major semi-final and the preliminary final to Adelaide Thunderbirds and Waikato Bay of Plenty Magic respectively and eventually finished the season in third place. After defeating Swifts in the major semi-final, Thunderbirds defeated Magic 52–42 in the grand final, winning their third premiership.

== Transfers ==
Player	2009 team	2010 team
(Australia) Erin Bell	New South Wales Swifts	Adelaide Thunderbirds
(Jamaica) Carla Borrego	Miami Hurricanes (basketball)	Adelaide Thunderbirds
(Australia) Jasmine Keene	West Coast Fever	Adelaide Thunderbirds
(Australia) Sharni Layton	Australian Institute of Sport	Adelaide Thunderbirds
(Australia) Demelza McCloud	Queensland Firebirds	Melbourne Vixens
(England) Sonia Mkoloma	Canterbury Tactix	New South Wales Swifts
(Australia) Ashleigh Brazill	Australian Institute of Sport	New South Wales Swifts
(Australia) Kristy Durheim	NNSW Blues	New South Wales Swifts
(Australia) Natalie Medhurst	Adelaide Thunderbirds	Queensland Firebirds
(Australia) Amy Steel	Melbourne Vixens	Queensland Firebirds
(Australia) Sarah Wall	Melbourne Vixens	Queensland Firebirds
(Australia) Janelle Lawson	Queensland Firebirds	West Coast Fever
(Australia) Bianca Reddy	Adelaide Thunderbirds	West Coast Fever
(Australia) Leah Shoard	Southern Steel	West Coast Fever
(New Zealand) Anna Galvan	Retirement	Canterbury Tactix
(Australia) Peta Stephens	Queensland Firebirds	Canterbury Tactix
(England) Ama Agbeze	Melbourne Vixens	Central Pulse
(Australia) Jane Altschwager	Adelaide Thunderbirds	Central Pulse
(New Zealand) Katrina Grant	Southern Steel	Central Pulse
(New Zealand) Rachel Rasmussen	Northern Mystics	Central Pulse
(New Zealand) Jenny-May Coffin	Retirement	Northern Mystics
(New Zealand) Joline Henry	Waikato Bay of Plenty Magic	Northern Mystics
(Jamaica) Althea Byfield	Central Pulse	Northern Mystics
(New Zealand) Maria Tutaia	Waikato Bay of Plenty Magic	Northern Mystics
(New Zealand) Larrissa Willcox	Canterbury Tactix	Northern Mystics
(New Zealand) Leana de Bruin	Waikato Bay of Plenty Magic	Southern Steel
(New Zealand) Jodi Brown	Canterbury Tactix	Waikato Bay of Plenty Magic
(England) Jade Clarke	Northern Thunder	Waikato Bay of Plenty Magic
(Australia) Peta Scholz	Oakdale	Waikato Bay of Plenty Magic
(England) Pamela Cookey	Northern Mystics	Team Bath
(England) Tamsin Greenway	Queensland Firebirds	Surrey Storm

== Head coaches and captains ==
Team	Head coach	Captain
Adelaide Thunderbirds	Jane Woodlands-Thompson	Natalie von Bertouch
Melbourne Vixens	Julie Hoornweg	Sharelle McMahon; Bianca Chatfield
New South Wales Swifts	Julie Fitzgerald	Catherine Cox
Queensland Firebirds	Roselee Jencke	Lauren Nourse
West Coast Fever	Jane Searle	Johannah Curran
Canterbury Tactix	Helen Mahon-Stroud	Maree Bowden
Central Pulse	Yvette McCausland-Durie	Jane Altschwager
Northern Mystics	Te Aroha Keenan	Temepara George
Southern Steel	Robyn Broughton	Megan Dehn
Waikato Bay of Plenty Magic	Noeline Taurua	Laura Langman

== Pre-season ==
Tournament	Date	Winner	Score	Runners-up	Venue
Christchurch Pre-Season Tournament	6-7 February	Southern Steel		^{(Note 1)}	Pioneer Stadium, Christchurch
Queenstown Pre-Season Tournament	19–21 February	Queensland Firebirds		^{(Note 2)}	Queenstown Events Centre
Netball Cup	5–7 March	Queensland Firebirds		^{(Note 3)}	Sydney Olympic Park Sports Centre

Notes

- ^1 Other participants included Canterbury Tactix and Eastwood Ryde of the New South Wales Premier League
- ^2 Other participants included Northern Mystics, Central Pulse, Canterbury Tactix, Southern Steel and the Australian Institute of Sport.
- ^3 Other participants included New South Wales Swifts, Melbourne Vixens, Adelaide Thunderbirds, West Coast Fever, Central Pulse and Southern Steel.

== Regular season ==
New South Wales Swifts went through the entire regular season home and away undefeated, winning 13 consecutive matches and finishing as minor premiers. They were the first team in the history of the ANZ Championship to do this.

=== Round 1 ===
Saturday 20 March	Northern Mystics	55 – 52	Adelaide Thunderbirds	Trusts Stadium
14:20 (UTC+13)	Cathrine Latu 30/32 (94%); Maria Tutaia 25/30 (83%)	Report; Stats	Erin Bell 3/5 (60%); Kate Beveridge 9/14 (64%); Carla Borrego 40/48 (83%)	Umpires: Liz Boon, Mandy Nottingham, Bobbi Brown

Sunday 21 March	Queensland Firebirds	47 – 50	New South Wales Swifts	Gold Coast Convention and Exhibition Centre
13:50 (UTC+10)	Romelda Aiken 29/34 (85%); Natalie Medhurst 18/23 (78%)	Report; Stats	Catherine Cox 30/38 (79%); Susan Pratley 20/27 (74%)

Sunday 21 March	Southern Steel	46 – 44	West Coast Fever	Stadium Southland
18:50 (UTC+13)	Megan Dehn 18/22 (82%); Daneka Wipiiti 28/33 (85%)	Report; Stats	Caitlin Bassett 34/35 (97%); Leah Shoard 10/15 (67%)	Umpires: Liz Boon, Fay Meiklejohn

Monday 22 March	Canterbury Tactix	54 – 48	Central Pulse	CBS Canterbury Arena
19:20 (UTC+13)	Ellen Halpenny 39/50 (78%); Anna Thompson 15/20 (75%)	Report; Stats	Jane Altschwager 9/14 (64%); Te Amo Amaru-Tibble 9/11 (82%); Paula Griffin 30/34 (88%)	Umpires: Jono Bredin, Bobbi Brown

Monday 22 March	Melbourne Vixens	48 – 40	Waikato Bay of Plenty Magic	Hisense Arena
19:05 (UTC+11)	Sharelle McMahon 23/27 (85%); Caitlin Thwaites 25/32 (78%)	Report; Stats	Jodi Brown 10/13 (77%); Jessica Tuki 11/19 (58%); Irene van Dyk 19/22 (86%)	Umpires: Sharon Kelly

=== Round 2 ===
Saturday 27 March	Central Pulse	50 – 61	Northern Mystics	Te Rauparaha Arena
14:20 (UTC+13)	Jane Altschwager 10/16 (63%); Te Amo Amaru-Tibble 14/17 (82%); Paula Griffin 26/31 (84%)	Report; Stats	Cathrine Latu 36/39 (92%); Maria Tutaia 25/29 (86%)

Saturday 27 March	Adelaide Thunderbirds	38 – 45	New South Wales Swifts	ETSA Park
13:50 (UTC+10:30)	Erin Bell 3/3 (100%); Kate Beveridge 5/8 (63%); Carla Borrego 30/39 (77%)	Stats	Catherine Cox 26/38 (68%); Susan Pratley 19/26 (73%)

Sunday 28 March	Melbourne Vixens	53 – 46	Queensland Firebirds	Hisense Arena
14:50 (UTC+11)	Sharelle McMahon 24/32 (75%); Caitlin Thwaites 29/35 (83%)	Stats	Romelda Aiken 23/36 (64%); Natalie Medhurst 23/27 (85%)

Monday 29 March	Waikato Bay of Plenty Magic	47 – 41	Southern Steel	Energy Events Centre
19:20 (UTC+13)	Jodi Brown 20/24 (83%); Irene van Dyk 27/30 (90%)	Report; Stats	Megan Dehn 12/14 (86%); Julianna Naoupu 29/34 (85%)	Umpires: Liz Boon, Bronwyn Meek

Monday 29 March	West Coast Fever	62 – 44	Canterbury Tactix	Challenge Stadium
17:05 (UTC+8)	Caitlin Bassett 45/52 (87%); Janelle Lawson 7/13 (54%); Ashleigh Neal 2/3 (67%); Leah Shoard 8/12 (67%)	Report; Stats	Ellen Halpenny 23/30 (77%); Anna Thompson 21/27 (78%)

=== Round 3 ===
Saturday 3 April	Northern Mystics	46 – 55	Waikato Bay of Plenty Magic	Trusts Stadium
14:20 (UTC+13)	Cathrine Latu 31/36 (86%); Maria Tutaia 15/23 (65%)	Report; Stats	Jodi Brown 21/26 (81%); Irene van Dyk 34/35 (97%)

Sunday 4 April	Queensland Firebirds	40 – 41	Adelaide Thunderbirds	Brisbane Convention and Exhibition Centre
14:50 (UTC+10)	Romelda Aiken 32/41 (78%); Natalie Medhurst 8/15 (53%)	Report; Stats	Kate Beveridge 9/14 (64%); Carla Borrego 32/35 (91%)

Sunday 4 April	Canterbury Tactix	53 – 56	New South Wales Swifts	CBS Canterbury Arena
18:50 (UTC+12)	Ellen Halpenny 31/45 (69%); Anna Thompson 22/29 (76%)	Q4: (45 – 45); Report; Stats	Catherine Cox 21/36 (58%); Susan Pratley 31/36 (86%); Amorette Wild 4/6 (67%)

Monday 5 April	Southern Steel	56 – 44	Central Pulse	Edgar Centre
19:20 (UTC+12)	Megan Dehn 14/18 (78%); Julianna Naoupu 19/22 (86%); Daneka Wipiiti 23/28 (82%)	Report; Stats	Jane Altschwager 21/26 (81%); Paula Griffin 23/30 (77%)

Monday 5 April	West Coast Fever	50 – 64	Melbourne Vixens	Challenge Stadium
18:05 (UTC+8)	Caitlin Bassett 39/49 (80%); Janelle Lawson 3/6 (50%); Leah Shoard 8/11 (73%)	Report; Stats	Kathleen Knott 2/5 (40%); Sharelle McMahon 18/24 (75%); Caitlin Thwaites 44/52 (85%)

=== Round 4: Rivalry Round ===
Round 4 featured five Australia verses New Zealand matches. Goals scored by Australian and New Zealand teams were added together and the country with the most goals won the Rivalry Round Trophy. After five matches, Australia won the 2010 Rivalry Round 4–1 and by 288–230.

Saturday 10 April	Waikato Bay of Plenty Magic	55 – 50	West Coast Fever	Mystery Creek Events Centre
14:20 (UTC+12)	Jodi Brown 14/21 (67%); Irene van Dyk 41/42 (98%)	Report; Stats	Caitlin Bassett 35/37 (95%); Leah Shoard 15/22 (68%)

Saturday 10 April	New South Wales Swifts	50 – 36	Central Pulse	Sydney Olympic Park Sports Centre
14:20 (UTC+10)	Catherine Cox 23/32 (72%); Susan Pratley 27/31 (87%)	Report; Stats	Jane Altschwager 16/22 (73%); Te Amo Amaru-Tibble 2/4 (50%); Paula Griffin 18/21 (86%)

Sunday 11 April	Adelaide Thunderbirds	53 – 36	Southern Steel	ETSA Park
14:20 (UTC+9:30)	Kate Beveridge 16/24 (67%); Carla Borrego 37/45 (82%)	Report; Stats	Megan Dehn 7/13 (54%); Julianna Naoupu 1/1 (100%); Daneka Wipiiti 28/34 (82%)

Monday 12 April	Canterbury Tactix	49 – 64	Melbourne Vixens	CBS Canterbury Arena
19:20 (UTC+12)	Anna Thompson 21/26 (81%); Ellen Halpenny 28/38 (74%)	Report; Stats	Caitlin Thwaites 39/45 (87%); Sharelle McMahon 25/31 (81%)

Monday 12 April	Queensland Firebirds	71 – 54	Northern Mystics	Brisbane Convention and Exhibition Centre
19:05 (UTC+10)	Romelda Aiken 42/50 (84%); Natalie Medhurst 29/32 (91%)	Report; Stats	Cathrine Latu 29/34 (85%); Maria Tutaia 25/29 (86%)

=== Round 5 ===
Saturday 17 April	Central Pulse	40 – 75	Adelaide Thunderbirds	TSB Bank Arena
14:20 (UTC+12)	Jane Altschwager 25/32 (78%); Paula Griffin 15/21 (71%)	Report; Stats	Kate Beveridge 16/19 (84%); Carla Borrego 58/59 (98%); Jasmine Keene 1/1 (100%)

Sunday 18 April	New South Wales Swifts	55 – 43	West Coast Fever	Newcastle Entertainment Centre
14:50 (UTC+10)	Catherine Cox 24/34 (71%); Susan Pratley 30/35 (86%); Lara Welham 1/2 (50%)	Report; Stats	Caitlin Bassett 27/33 (82%); Leah Shoard 16/22 (73%)

Sunday 18 April	Canterbury Tactix	36 – 53	Waikato Bay of Plenty Magic	CBS Canterbury Arena
18:50 (UTC+12)	Anna Thompson 17/25 (68%); Ellen Halpenny 19/32 (59%)	Report; Stats	Jodi Brown 24/32 (75%); Jessica Tuki 3/6 (50%); Irene van Dyk 26/27 (96%)

Monday 19 April	Southern Steel	41 – 56	Queensland Firebirds	Stadium Southland
19:20 (UTC+12)	Megan Dehn 13/17 (76%); Julianna Naoupu 15/22 (68%); Daneka Wipiiti 13/15 (87%)	Report; Stats	Romelda Aiken 29/37 (78%); Natalie Medhurst 27/31 (87%)

Monday 19 April	Melbourne Vixens	62 – 51	Northern Mystics	Hisense Arena
19:05 (UTC+10)	Tegan Caldwell 3/3 (100%); Sharelle McMahon 24/28 (86%); Caitlin Thwaites 35/40 (88%)	Report; Stats	Cathrine Latu 35/40 (88%); Maria Tutaia 16/22 (73%)

=== Round 6 ===
Saturday 24 April	Northern Mystics	59 – 50	Canterbury Tactix	Trusts Stadium
14:20 (UTC+12)	Cathrine Latu 33/34 (97%); Maria Tutaia 26/31 (84%)	Report; Stats	Ellen Halpenny 32/37 (86%); Anna Thompson 18/23 (78%)

Sunday 25 April	Queensland Firebirds	62 – 41	Melbourne Vixens	Brisbane Convention and Exhibition Centre
14:20 (UTC+10)	Romelda Aiken 34/43 (79%); Natalie Medhurst 28/32 (88%)	Report; Stats	Tegan Caldwell 10/13 (77%); Kathleen Knott 24/34 (71%); Sharelle McMahon 7/8 (88%)

Monday 26 April	Central Pulse	40 – 64	Southern Steel	TSB Bank Arena
19:20 (UTC+12)	Jane Altschwager 8/10 (80%); Te Amo Amaru-Tibble 19/22 (86%); Paula Griffin 13/16 (81%)	Report; Stats	Megan Dehn 9/14 (64%); Julianna Naoupu 17/20 (85%); Jade Topia 4/5 (80%); Daneka Wipiiti 23/28 (82%)

Monday 26 April	West Coast Fever	37 – 57	Adelaide Thunderbirds	Challenge Stadium
18:05 (UTC+8)	Caitlin Bassett 18/24 (75%); Janelle Lawson 3/6 (50%); Ashleigh Neal 2/4 (50%); Shoard 14/23 (61%)	Report; Stats	Kate Beveridge 15/22 (68%); Carla Borrego 42/46 (91%)

BYES: New South Wales Swifts and Waikato Bay of Plenty Magic

=== Round 7 ===
Saturday 1 May	Canterbury Tactix	38 – 66	Southern Steel	CBS Canterbury Arena
14:20 (UTC+12)	Ellen Halpenny 15/24 (63%); Anna Thompson 19/23 (83%); Ashleigh Smith 4/9 (44%); Angela Mitchell 0/1 (0%)	Report; Stats	Daneka Wipiiti 38/46 (83%); Megan Dehn 16/20 (80%); Julianna Naoupu 12/12 (100%)

Sunday 2 May	New South Wales Swifts	56 – 42	Melbourne Vixens	Acer Arena
14:50 (UTC+10)	Catherine Cox 29/31 (94%); Susan Pratley 27/30 (90%)	Report; Stats	Sharelle McMahon 19/20 (95%); Caitlin Thwaites 23/26 (88%)	Attendance: 6,928

Monday 3 May	Waikato Bay of Plenty Magic	49 – 46	Northern Mystics	Mystery Creek Events Centre
19:20 (UTC+12)	Jodi Brown 12/14 (86%); Irene van Dyk 37/40 (93%)	Report; Stats	Cathrine Latu 25/30 (83%); Maria Tutaia 21/25 (84%)

Monday 3 May	Queensland Firebirds	63 – 57	West Coast Fever	Brisbane Convention and Exhibition Centre
19:05 (UTC+10)	Romelda Aiken 36/39 (92%); Natalie Medhurst 27/34 (79%)	Report; Stats	Caitlin Bassett 50/59 (85%); Janelle Lawson 2/4 (50%); Leah Shoard 5/15 (33%)

BYES: Adelaide Thunderbirds and Central Pulse

=== Round 8 ===
Saturday 8 May	Waikato Bay of Plenty Magic	56 – 44	Central Pulse	Energy Events Centre
14:20 (UTC+12)	Jodi Brown 6/8 (75%); Tanya Lund 10/13 (77%); Irene van Dyk 40/42 (95%)	Report; Stats	Jane Altschwager 18/25 (72%); Paula Griffin 26/32 (81%)

Sunday 9 May	New South Wales Swifts	60 – 44	Adelaide Thunderbirds	Sydney Olympic Park Sports Centre
14:50 (UTC+10)	Catherine Cox 36/44 (82%); Susan Pratley 24/34 (71%)	Report; Stats	Erin Bell 7/10 (70%); Kate Beveridge 8/12 (67%); Carla Borrego 29/38 (76%)

Monday 10 May	Southern Steel	49 – 52	Northern Mystics	Stadium Southland
19:20 (UTC+12)	Megan Dehn 15/18 (83%); Julianna Naoupu 22/33 (67%); Daneka Wipiiti 12/15 (80%)	Report; Stats	Cathrine Latu 28/29 (97%); Maria Tutaia 24/27 (89%)

Monday 10 May	Melbourne Vixens	53 – 56	West Coast Fever	Hisense Arena
19:05 (UTC+10)	Sharelle McMahon 18/27 (67%); Caitlin Thwaites 35/43 (81%)	Report; Stats	Caitlin Bassett 46/49 (94%); Janelle Lawson 3/4 (75%); Leah Shoard 7/9 (78%)

BYES: Queensland Firebirds and Canterbury Tactix

=== Round 9 ===
Saturday 15 May	Waikato Bay of Plenty Magic	72 – 52	Canterbury Tactix	Mystery Creek Events Centre
14:20 (UTC+12)	Jodi Brown 24/29 (83%); Irene van Dyk 48/50 (96%)	Report; Stats	Ellen Halpenny 6/8 (75%); Angela Mitchell 14/21 (67%); Anna Thompson 32/36 (89%)

Sunday 16 May	Adelaide Thunderbirds	58 – 47	Melbourne Vixens	ETSA Park
14:20 (UTC+9:30)	Kate Beveridge 15/21 (71%); Carla Borrego 43/50 (86%)	Report; Stats	Sharelle McMahon 21/30 (70%); Caitlin Thwaites 26/33 (79%)

Monday 17 May	Northern Mystics	61 – 60	Central Pulse	Trusts Stadium
19:20 (UTC+12)	Cathrine Latu 41/41 (100%); Maria Tutaia 20/29 (69%)	Q4: (51 – 51); Report; Stats	Jane Altschwager 25/35 (71%); Paula Griffin 35/40 (88%)

Monday 17 May	New South Wales Swifts	44 – 40	Queensland Firebirds	Sydney Olympic Park Sports Centre
19:05 (UTC+10)	Catherine Cox 19/33 (58%); Susan Pratley 25/31 (81%)	Report; Stats	Romelda Aiken 26/33 (79%); Natalie Medhurst 14/21 (67%)

BYES: West Coast Fever and Southern Steel

=== Round 10 ===
Saturday 22 May	Central Pulse	45 – 43	Canterbury Tactix	TSB Bank Arena
14:20 (UTC+12)	Jane Altschwager 15/23 (65%); Te Amo Amaru-Tibble 3/5 (60%); Paula Griffin 27/29 (93%)	Report; Stats	Ellen Halpenny 17/24 (71%); Angela Mitchell 4/10 (40%); Anna Thompson 22/25 (88%)

Sunday 23 May	Adelaide Thunderbirds	53 – 51	Queensland Firebirds	ETSA Park
14:20 (UTC+9:30)	Kate Beveridge 15/20 (75%); Carla Borrego 38/41 (93%)	Report; Stats	Romelda Aiken 32/39 (82%); Natalie Medhurst 19/27 (70%)

Monday 24 May	Southern Steel	52 – 47	Waikato Bay of Plenty Magic	Stadium Southland
19:20 (UTC+12)	Megan Dehn 20/22 (91%); Daneka Wipiiti 32/34 (94%)	Report; Stats	Jodi Brown 18/25 (72%); Irene van Dyk 29/32 (91%)

Monday 24 May	West Coast Fever	52 – 61	New South Wales Swifts	Challenge Stadium
18:05 (UTC+8)	Caitlin Bassett 38/45 (84%); Leah Shoard 14/20 (70%)	Stats	Catherine Cox 33/42 (79%); Susan Pratley 28/36 (78%)

BYES: Melbourne Vixens and Northern Mystics

=== Round 11 ===
Saturday 29 May	Northern Mystics	48 – 54	New South Wales Swifts	Trusts Stadium
14:20 (UTC+12)	Cathrine Latu 30/33 (91%); Maria Tutaia 18/24 (75%)	Stats	Catherine Cox 26/33 (79%); Susan Pratley 28/32 (88%)

Sunday 30 May	Adelaide Thunderbirds	58 – 34	Canterbury Tactix	ETSA Park
14:20 (UTC+9:30)	Erin Bell 5/5 (100%); Kate Beveridge 15/21 (71%); Carla Borrego 38/45 (84%)	Stats	Ellen Halpenny 21/31 (68%); Anna Thompson 13/17 (76%)

Sunday 30 May	Southern Steel	52 – 39	Melbourne Vixens	Edgar Centre
18:50 (UTC+12)	Megan Dehn 23/27 (85%); Julianna Naoupu 2/3 (67%); Daneka Wipiiti 27/31 (87%)	Stats	Tegan Caldwell 11/11 (100%); Kathleen Knott 13/16 (81%); Sharelle McMahon 10/15 (67%); Caitlin Thwaites 5/6 (83%)

Monday 31 May	Waikato Bay of Plenty Magic	54 – 55	Queensland Firebirds	Energy Events Centre
19:20 (UTC+12)	Jodi Brown 22/27 (81%); Irene van Dyk 32/34 (94%)	Stats	Romelda Aiken 35/37 (95%); Natalie Medhurst 20/21 (95%)

Monday 31 May	West Coast Fever	63 – 45	Central Pulse	Challenge Stadium
17:05 (UTC+8)	Caitlin Bassett 42/51 (82%); Leah Shoard 21/29 (72%)	Stats	Jane Altschwager 4/10 (40%); Paula Griffin 29/38 (76%); Jamilah Gupwell 12/14 (86%)

=== Round 12 ===
Saturday 5 June	Northern Mystics	62 – 53	West Coast Fever	North Shore Events Centre
14:20 (UTC+12)	Cathrine Latu 40/41 (98%); Maria Tutaia 22/27 (81%)	Stats	Caitlin Bassett 44/50 (88%); Leah Shoard 9/14 (64%)

Saturday 5 June	Queensland Firebirds	52 – 42	Central Pulse	Brisbane Convention and Exhibition Centre
14:20 (UTC+10)	Romelda Aiken 31/40 (78%); Natalie Medhurst 21/24 (88%)	Stats	Paula Griffin 23/28 (82%); Jamilah Gupwell 19/22 (86%)

Sunday 6 June	Melbourne Vixens	43 – 54	Adelaide Thunderbirds	Hisense Arena
14:50 (UTC+10)	Tegan Caldwell 13/17 (76%); Kathleen Knott 5/6 (83%); Sharelle McMahon 21/25 (84%); Caitlin Thwaites 4/5 (80%)	Stats	Kate Beveridge 12/16 (75%); Carla Borrego 42/48 (88%)

Monday 7 June	Southern Steel	53 – 39	Canterbury Tactix	Stadium Southland
19:20 (UTC+12)	Megan Dehn 22/24 (92%); Daneka Wipiiti 31/33 (94%)	Stats	Ellen Halpenny 11/18 (61%); Anna Thompson 28/35 (80%)

Monday 7 June	New South Wales Swifts	60 – 43	Waikato Bay of Plenty Magic	Sydney Olympic Park Sports Centre
19:05 (UTC+10)	Catherine Cox 31/39 (79%); Susan Pratley 29/34 (85%)	Report; Stats	Jodi Brown 16/19 (84%); Irene van Dyk 27/29 (93%)

=== Round 13 ===
Saturday 12 June	Central Pulse	52 – 58	Waikato Bay of Plenty Magic	Pettigrew Green Arena
14:20 (UTC+12)	Paula Griffin 31/38 (82%); Jamilah Gupwell 21/25 (84%)	Stats	Jodi Brown 11/13 (85%); Tanya Lund 5/8 (63%); Irene van Dyk 42/42 (100%)

Saturday 12 June	Melbourne Vixens	46 – 58	New South Wales Swifts	Hisense Arena
14:20 (UTC+10)	Tegan Caldwell 11/11 (100%); Sharelle McMahon 24/29 (83%); Caitlin Thwaites 11/17 (65%)	Stats	Catherine Cox 31/40 (78%); Susan Pratley 19/23 (83%); Amorette Wild 8/10 (80%)

Sunday 13 June	Adelaide Thunderbirds	54 – 45	West Coast Fever	ETSA Park
14:20 (UTC+9:30)	Erin Bell 8/12 (67%); Kate Beveridge 4/6 (67%); Carla Borrego 42/57 (74%)	Stats	Caitlin Bassett 26/36 (72%); Janelle Lawson 1/1 (100%); Leah Shoard 18/21 (86%)

Monday 14 June	Northern Mystics	43 – 50	Southern Steel	Trusts Stadium
19:20 (UTC+12)	Cathrine Latu 17/17 (100%); Maria Tutaia 26/32 (81%)	Stats	Megan Dehn 16/20 (80%); Daneka Wipiiti 34/39 (87%)

Monday 14 June	Queensland Firebirds	75 – 32	Canterbury Tactix	Brisbane Convention and Exhibition Centre
19:05 (UTC+10)	Romelda Aiken 47/62 (76%); Natalie Medhurst 28/36 (78%)	Stats	Ellen Halpenny 9/11 (82%); Angela Mitchell 8/12 (67%); Anna Thompson 15/19 (79%)

=== Round 14 ===
Saturday 19 June	Waikato Bay of Plenty Magic	53 – 44	Adelaide Thunderbirds	Energy Events Centre
14:20 (UTC+12)	Jodi Brown 16/17 (94%); Irene van Dyk 37/43 (86%)	Stats	Erin Bell 7/9 (78%); Kate Beveridge 11/17 (65%); Carla Borrego 26/31 (84%)

Sunday 20 June	West Coast Fever	67 – 59	Queensland Firebirds	Challenge Stadium
12:50 (UTC+8)	Caitlin Bassett 44/50 (88%); Leah Shoard 23/27 (85%)	Stats	Romelda Aiken 36/43 (84%); Natalie Medhurst 23/27 (85%)

Sunday 20 June	Canterbury Tactix	47 – 58	Northern Mystics	CBS Canterbury Arena
18:50 (UTC+12)	Anna Thompson 23/29 (79%); Ellen Halpenny 24/31 (77%)	Stats	Cathrine Latu 36/41 (88%); Maria Tutaia 22/27 (81%)

Monday 21 June	Central Pulse	48 – 49	Melbourne Vixens	Te Rauparaha Arena
19:20 (UTC+12)	Jane Altschwager 10/11 (91%); Paula Griffin 31/40 (78%); Jamilah Gupwell 7/12 (58%)	Stats	Tegan Caldwell 24/28 (86%); Kathleen Knott 12/16 (75%); Caitlin Thwaites 13/13 (100%)

Monday 21 June	New South Wales Swifts	55 – 38	Southern Steel	Sydney Olympic Park Sports Centre
19:05 (UTC+10)	Catherine Cox 28/37 (76%); Susan Pratley 27/32 (84%)	Stats	Megan Dehn 13/14 (93%); Julianna Naoupu 6/7 (86%); Daneka Wipiiti 19/24 (79%)

=== Final table ===
2010 ANZ Championship ladder
Pos	Team	Pld	W	L	GF	GA	PP	Pts	Qualification
1	New South Wales Swifts	13	13	0	704	570	123.5	26	Qualified for Major semi-final
2	Adelaide Thunderbirds	13	9	4	681	586	116.2	18	Qualified for Major semi-final
3	Waikato Bay of Plenty Magic	13	9	4	682	626	108.9	18	Qualified for Minor semi-final
4	Southern Steel	13	8	5	644	597	107.9	16	Qualified for Minor semi-final
5	Queensland Firebirds	13	7	6	717	629	114.0	14	
6	Northern Mystics	13	7	6	696	702	99.1	14	
7	Melbourne Vixens	13	6	7	651	680	95.7	12	
8	West Coast Fever	13	4	9	679	718	94.6	8	
9	Central Pulse	13	1	12	594	742	80.1	2	
10	Canterbury Tactix	13	1	12	571	769	74.3	2	

Rules for classification: 2 points for a win, 0 points for a loss.

== Playoffs ==
Semifinals
27 June – Sydney
New South Wales Swifts	38
Adelaide Thunderbirds	52
28 June – Auckland
Waikato Bay of Plenty Magic	50
Southern Steel	42

Preliminary final
4 July – Newcastle
New South Wales Swifts	49
Waikato Bay of Plenty Magic	54

Grand final
11 July – Adelaide
Adelaide Thunderbirds	52
Waikato Bay of Plenty Magic	42

=== Major semi-final ===
Sunday 27 June; 14:50 (UTC+10)	Stats	New South Wales Swifts	38–52	Adelaide Thunderbirds	Acer Arena; Attendance: 6,928
Sunday 27 June; 14:50 (UTC+10)	Stats	Scoring by quarter: 10-14, 8-17, 9-14, 11-7			Acer Arena; Attendance: 6,928
Sunday 27 June; 14:50 (UTC+10)	Stats	Susan Pratley 22/31 (71%); Catherine Cox 9/16 (56%); Amorette Wild 7/8 (88%)		Carla Borrego 37/43 (86%); Erin Bell 12/16 (75%); Kate Beveridge 2/2 (100%); Jasmine Keene 1/1 (100%)	Acer Arena; Attendance: 6,928

=== Minor semi-final ===
Monday 28 June; 19:20 (UTC+12)	Stats	Waikato Bay of Plenty Magic	50–42	Southern Steel	Vector Arena; Umpires: Sharon Kelly (Australia), Mandy Nottingham (New Zealand)
Monday 28 June; 19:20 (UTC+12)	Stats	Scoring by quarter: 16-8, 8-13, 14-11, 12-10			Vector Arena; Umpires: Sharon Kelly (Australia), Mandy Nottingham (New Zealand)
Monday 28 June; 19:20 (UTC+12)	Stats	Irene van Dyk 41/46 (89%); Jodi Brown 9/11 (82%)		Megan Dehn 24/25 (96%); Daneka Wipiiti 11/17 (65%); Julianna Naoupu 7/9 (78%)	Vector Arena; Umpires: Sharon Kelly (Australia), Mandy Nottingham (New Zealand)

=== Preliminary final ===
Sunday 4 July; 14:50 (UTC+10)	Stats	New South Wales Swifts	49–54	Waikato Bay of Plenty Magic	Newcastle Entertainment Centre; Umpires: Sharon Kelly (Australia), Mandy Nottingham (New Zealand)
Sunday 4 July; 14:50 (UTC+10)	Stats	Scoring by quarter: 11-12, 9-17, 12-13, 17-12			Newcastle Entertainment Centre; Umpires: Sharon Kelly (Australia), Mandy Nottingham (New Zealand)
Sunday 4 July; 14:50 (UTC+10)	Stats	Catherine Cox 32/38 (84%); Susan Pratley 17/21 (81%)		Irene van Dyk 43/44 (98%); Jodi Brown 11/13 (85%)	Newcastle Entertainment Centre; Umpires: Sharon Kelly (Australia), Mandy Nottingham (New Zealand)

=== Grand final ===
Sunday 11 July; 14:30 (UTC+9:30)	Stats	Adelaide Thunderbirds	52–42	Waikato Bay of Plenty Magic	Adelaide Entertainment Centre; Attendance: 9,300; Umpires: Sharon Kelly (Australia), Mandy Nottingham (New Zealand)
Sunday 11 July; 14:30 (UTC+9:30)	Stats	Scoring by quarter: 15-8, 13-13, 11-8, 13-13			Adelaide Entertainment Centre; Attendance: 9,300; Umpires: Sharon Kelly (Australia), Mandy Nottingham (New Zealand)
Sunday 11 July; 14:30 (UTC+9:30)	Stats	Carla Borrego 40/46 (87%); Erin Bell 12/19 (63%)		Irene van Dyk 30/33 (91%); Jodi Brown 12/16 (75%)	Adelaide Entertainment Centre; Attendance: 9,300; Umpires: Sharon Kelly (Australia), Mandy Nottingham (New Zealand)

== Season statistics ==
As of 21 June 2010.

Top 5 goals scored
Pos.	Player	Team	Goals
1	Carla Borrego	Adelaide Thunderbirds	497
2	Caitlin Bassett	West Coast Fever	486
3	Irene van Dyk	Waikato Bay of Plenty Magic	440
4	Romelda Aiken	Queensland Firebirds	430
5	Cathrine Latu	Northern Mystics	411

Top 5 shots at goal
Pos.	Player	Team	Shots
1	Carla Borrego	Adelaide Thunderbirds	581
2	Caitlin Bassett	West Coast Fever	568
3	Romelda Aiken	Queensland Firebirds	532
4	Catherine Cox	New South Wales Swifts	477
5	Irene van Dyk	Waikato Bay of Plenty Magic	470

Top 5 shooting accuracy
Pos.	Player	Team	Goal %
1	Irene van Dyk	Waikato Bay of Plenty Magic	93.6
2	Cathrine Latu	Northern Mystics	91.7
3	Tegan Caldwell	Melbourne Vixens	86.7
4	Daneka Wipiiti	Southern Steel	86.0
5	Caitlin Bassett	West Coast Fever	86.0

Top 5 intercepts
Pos.	Player	Team	Inter.
1	Althea Byfield	Northern Mystics	40
2	Casey Williams	Waikato Bay of Plenty Magic	38
3	Sonia Mkoloma	New South Wales Swifts	31
4	Laura Geitz	Queensland Firebirds	29
5=	Geva Mentor	Adelaide Thunderbirds	28
5=	Charlotte Kight	Canterbury Tactix	28

Top 5 offensive rebounds
Pos.	Player	Team	O/Reb.
1	Romelda Aiken	Queensland Firebirds	69
2	Carla Borrego	Adelaide Thunderbirds	39
3	Caitlin Bassett	West Coast Fever	38
4	Cathrine Latu	Northern Mystics	34
5	Ellen Halpenny	Canterbury Tactix	25

Top 5 defensive rebounds
Pos.	Player	Team	D/Reb.
1	Casey Williams	Waikato Bay of Plenty Magic	53
2	Laura Geitz	Queensland Firebirds	44
3=	Geva Mentor	Adelaide Thunderbirds	39
3=	Leana de Bruin	Southern Steel	33
5=	Rebecca Bulley	New South Wales Swifts	33
5=	Susan Fuhrmann	West Coast Fever	35

== Award winners ==
=== ANZ Championship awards ===
Award	Winner	Team
Most Valuable Player	(New Zealand) Liana Barrett-Chase	Southern Steel
Grand final MVP	(England) Geva Mentor	Adelaide Thunderbirds
Best Young Player Award	(Australia) Sharni Layton	Adelaide Thunderbirds

=== Australian Netball Awards ===
Award	Winner	Team
Liz Ellis Diamond	(Australia) Natalie von Bertouch	Adelaide Thunderbirds
Australian ANZ Championship Player of the Year	(Australia) Natalie von Bertouch	Adelaide Thunderbirds
Australian ANZ Championship Coach of the Year	(Australia) Jane Woodlands-Thompson	Adelaide Thunderbirds

=== Holden Cruze award ===
Award	Winner	Team
Holden Cruze Player of the Year	(Australia) Rebecca Bulley	New South Wales Swifts

== Gallery ==
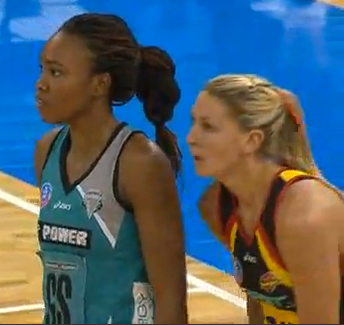
11 July 2010; Carla Borrego playing for Adelaide Thunderbirds against Waikato Bay of Plenty Magic in the 2010 ANZ Championship grand final.

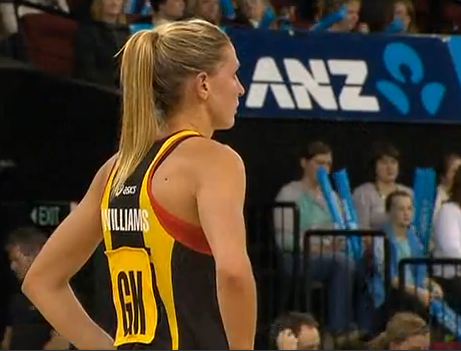
11 July 2010; Casey Williams playing for Waikato Bay of Plenty Magic against Adelaide Thunderbirds in the 2010 ANZ Championship grand final.
