= List of ANZ Championship players =

List of netball players

The following is a list of netball players who played in the ANZ Championship between 2008 and 2016.

== ANZ Championship award winners ==
There were four official ANZ Championship Awards.

=== ANZ Championship Most Valuable Player ===
Season	Winner	Team
2008	(Jamaica) Romelda Aiken ^{(Note 1)}	Queensland Firebirds
2008	(England) Sonia Mkoloma ^{(Note 1)}	Central Pulse
2009	(Jamaica) Romelda Aiken	Queensland Firebirds
2010	(New Zealand) Liana Barrett-Chase	Southern Steel
2011	(New Zealand) Leana de Bruin ^{(Note 2)}	Southern Steel
2011	(Australia) Natalie Medhurst ^{(Note 2)}	Queensland Firebirds
2012	(New Zealand) Temepara George ^{(Note 3)}	Northern Mystics
2012	(New Zealand) Laura Langman ^{(Note 3)}	Waikato Bay of Plenty Magic
2013	(Jamaica) Jhaniele Fowler	Southern Steel
2014	(Australia) Kimberlee Green ^{(Note 4)}	New South Wales Swifts
2014	(England) Joanne Harten ^{(Note 4)}	Waikato Bay of Plenty Magic
2015	(Jamaica) Romelda Aiken ^{(Note 5)}	Queensland Firebirds
2015	(Jamaica) Jhaniele Fowler ^{(Note 5)}	Southern Steel
2016	(Australia) Madison Robinson ^{(Note 6)}	Melbourne Vixens
2016	(Jamaica) Jhaniele Fowler ^{(Note 6)}	Southern Steel

Notes

- ^1 Romelda Aiken and Sonia Mkoloma shared the 2008 award.
- ^2 Leana de Bruin and Natalie Medhurst shared the 2011 award.
- ^3 Temepara George and Laura Langman shared the 2012 award.
- ^4 Kimberlee Green and Joanne Harten shared the 2014 award.
- ^5 In 2015 Romelda Aiken was the MVP player in the Australian Conference and Jhaniele Fowler was the MVP player in the New Zealand Conference.
- ^6 In 2016 Madison Robinson was the MVP player in the Australian Conference and Jhaniele Fowler was the MVP player in the New Zealand Conference.

=== ANZ Championship Grand Final MVP ===
Season	Winner	Team
2008	(Australia) Catherine Cox	New South Wales Swifts
2009	(Australia) Sharelle McMahon	Melbourne Vixens
2010	(England) Geva Mentor	Adelaide Thunderbirds
2011	(Jamaica) Romelda Aiken	Queensland Firebirds
2012	(New Zealand) Leana de Bruin	Waikato Bay of Plenty Magic
2013	(Australia) Erin Bell	Adelaide Thunderbirds
2014	(Australia) Tegan Caldwell	Melbourne Vixens
2015	(Australia) Sharni Layton ^{(Note 7)}	New South Wales Swifts
2016	(Australia) Kim Ravaillion ^{(Note 7)}	Queensland Firebirds

Notes

- ^7 In 2015 and 2016 this award was changed to Finals Series MVP which includes all matches in the Finals and not just the Grand Final.

=== ANZ Championship Best New Talent ===
Season	Winner	Team
2010	(Australia) Sharni Layton	Adelaide Thunderbirds
2011	(New Zealand) Kayla Cullen	Northern Mystics
2012	(New Zealand) Julianna Naoupu	Waikato Bay of Plenty Magic
2013	(Jamaica) Jhaniele Fowler	Southern Steel
2014	(Malawi) Mwai Kumwenda	Mainland Tactix
2015	(England) Serena Guthrie	Northern Mystics
2016	(Australia) Kristina Brice	Adelaide Thunderbirds

=== Foxtel ANZ Championship All Star Teams ===
==== 2011 ====
Position	Player	Team
GS	(Jamaica) Romelda Aiken	Queensland Firebirds
GA	(Australia) Sharelle McMahon	Melbourne Vixens
WA	(Australia) Emily Beaton	Adelaide Thunderbirds
C	(Australia) Natalie von Bertouch	Adelaide Thunderbirds
WD	(New Zealand) Kayla Cullen	Northern Mystics
GD	(New Zealand) Anna Scarlett	Northern Mystics
GK	(New Zealand) Leana de Bruin	Southern Steel
Coach	(Australia) Roselee Jencke	Queensland Firebirds

==== 2012 ====
Position	Player	Team
GS	(New Zealand) Irene van Dyk	Waikato Bay of Plenty Magic
GA	(New Zealand) Maria Tutaia	Northern Mystics
WA	(Australia) Madison Browne	Melbourne Vixens
C	(New Zealand) Laura Langman	Waikato Bay of Plenty Magic
WD	(Australia) Julie Corletto	Melbourne Vixens
GD	(New Zealand) Casey Williams	Waikato Bay of Plenty Magic
GK	(England) Geva Mentor	Melbourne Vixens
Coach	(New Zealand) Noeline Taurua	Waikato Bay of Plenty Magic

==== 2013 ====
Position	Player	Team
GS	(Jamaica) Jhaniele Fowler	Southern Steel
GA	(Australia) Erin Bell	Adelaide Thunderbirds
WA	(Australia) Madison Browne	Melbourne Vixens
C	(New Zealand) Laura Langman	Waikato Bay of Plenty Magic
WD	(Australia) Renae Hallinan	Adelaide Thunderbirds
GD	(New Zealand) Casey Kopua	Waikato Bay of Plenty Magic
GK	(England) Geva Mentor	Melbourne Vixens
Coach	(Australia) Jane Woodlands-Thompson	Adelaide Thunderbirds

==== 2014 ====
Position	Player	Team
GS	(Jamaica) Jhaniele Fowler-Reid	Southern Steel
GA	(Australia) Susan Pratley	New South Wales Swifts
WA	(Australia) Madison Robinson	Melbourne Vixens
C	(Australia) Kimberlee Green	New South Wales Swifts
WD	(Australia) Renae Hallinan	Adelaide Thunderbirds
GD	(New Zealand) Casey Kopua	Waikato Bay of Plenty Magic
GK	(England) Geva Mentor	Melbourne Vixens
Coach	(Australia) Julie Fitzgerald	Waikato Bay of Plenty Magic

==== 2015 ====
Position	Player	Team
GS	(Australia) Caitlin Bassett	West Coast Fever
GA	(Australia) Susan Pettitt	New South Wales Swifts
WA	(Australia) Kimberlee Green	New South Wales Swifts
C	(Australia) Kim Ravaillion	Queensland Firebirds
WD	(England) Serena Guthrie	Northern Mystics
GD	(Australia) Julie Corletto	New South Wales Swifts
GK	(Australia) Sharni Layton	New South Wales Swifts
Coach	(Australia) Stacey Rosman	West Coast Fever

==== 2016 ====
Position	Player	Team
GS	(Jamaica) Romelda Aiken	Queensland Firebirds
GA	(Australia) Susan Pettitt	New South Wales Swifts
WA	(Australia) Kimberlee Green	New South Wales Swifts
C	(Australia) Kim Ravaillion	Queensland Firebirds
WD	(New Zealand) Laura Langman	New South Wales Swifts
GD	(Australia) Clare McMeniman	Queensland Firebirds
GK	(Australia) Sharni Layton	New South Wales Swifts
Coach	(Australia) Robert Wright	New South Wales Swifts

=== Golden Bib Award ===
In 2014 the ANZ Championship introduced the Golden Bib Award which recognised the top attacker, top midcourter and top defender from each round. The award was determined on statistics and players earned two points for a goal assist and a point for centre pass receive.

==== 2014 ====
Round	Attacker	Midcourter	Defender
1	(New Zealand) Ellen Halpenny (Magic)	(New Zealand) Grace Rasmussen (Magic)	(England) Geva Mentor (Vixens)
2	(Malawi) Mwai Kumwenda (Tactix)	(Australia) Madison Robinson (Vixens) (Australia) Brooke Miller (Swifts)	(New Zealand) Leana de Bruin (Magic)
3	(Australia) Caitlin Bassett (Fever)	(New Zealand) Grace Rasmussen (Magic)	(England) Eboni Beckford-Chambers (Fever)
4	(Australia) Caitlin Bassett (Fever)	(New Zealand) Grace Rasmussen (Magic)	(New Zealand) Casey Kopua (Magic)
5	(Australia) Tegan Caldwell (Vixens)	(New Zealand) Grace Rasmussen (Magic)	(England) Geva Mentor (Vixens)
6	(Jamaica) Jhaniele Fowler-Reid (Steel)	(New Zealand) Laura Langman (Mystics)	(Australia) Laura Geitz (Firebirds)
7	(Jamaica) Jhaniele Fowler-Reid (Steel)	(Australia) Madison Robinson (Vixens)	(Australia) Laura Geitz (Firebirds)
8	(Jamaica) Jhaniele Fowler-Reid (Steel)	(Australia) Madison Robinson (Vixens)	(England) Geva Mentor (Vixens)
9	(New Zealand) Cathrine Latu (Mystics)	(Australia) Madison Robinson (Vixens)	(New Zealand) Katrina Grant (Pulse)
10	(Jamaica) Romelda Aiken (Firebirds)	(Australia) Emily Beaton (Thunderbirds)	(England) Geva Mentor (Vixens)
11	(New Zealand) Irene van Dyk (Pulse)	(New Zealand) Grace Rasmussen (Magic)	(Australia) Laura Geitz (Firebirds)
12	(New Zealand) Ellen Halpenny (Magic) (England) Joanne Harten (Magic)	(Australia) Madison Robinson (Vixens)	(Australia) Bianca Chatfield (Vixens)
13	(Jamaica) Romelda Aiken (Firebirds)	(Australia) Madison Robinson (Vixens)	(New Zealand) Casey Kopua (Magic)
14	(Australia) Erin Bell (Thunderbirds)	(New Zealand) Shannon Francois (Steel)	(Australia) Rebecca Bulley (Thunderbirds)

== Australian Netball Awards ==
=== Liz Ellis Diamond ===
In 2008 Netball Australia introduced the Liz Ellis Diamond award in honour of Liz Ellis. It was awarded to the best performing player in the ANZ Championship and with the Australia national netball team. This is a list of the players who won the award during the ANZ Championship era. It was not awarded in 2016.

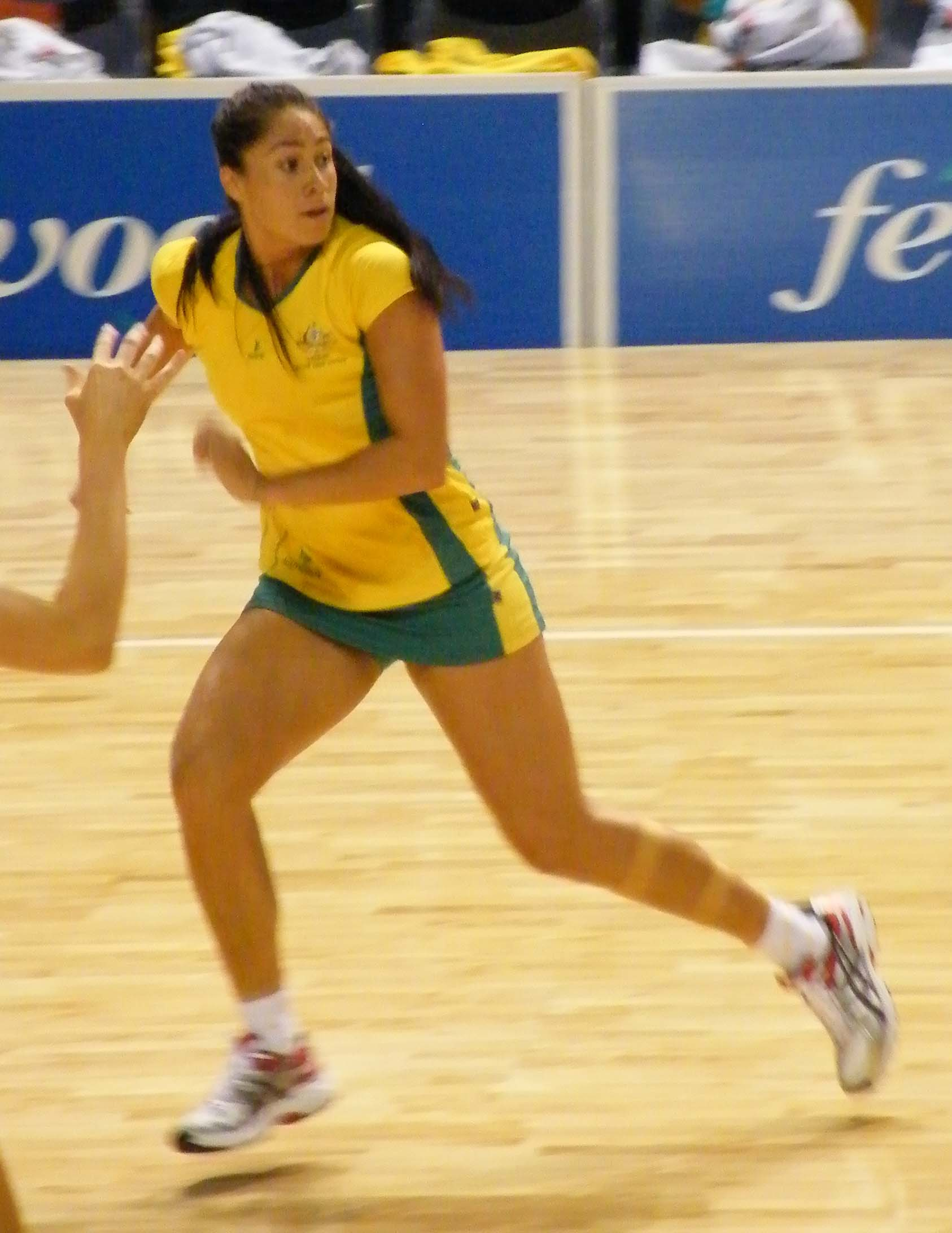
8 October 2008; Mo'onia Gerrard, the inaugural winner of the Liz Ellis Diamond playing for Australia.

Season	Winner	Team
2008	Mo'onia Gerrard	Adelaide Thunderbirds
2009	Julie Corletto	Melbourne Vixens
2010	Natalie von Bertouch	Adelaide Thunderbirds
2011	Laura Geitz	Queensland Firebirds
2012	Madison Browne	Melbourne Vixens
2013	Renae Hallinan	Adelaide Thunderbirds
2014	Madison Robinson	Melbourne Vixens
2015	Caitlin Bassett	West Coast Fever

=== Australian ANZ Championship Player of the Year ===
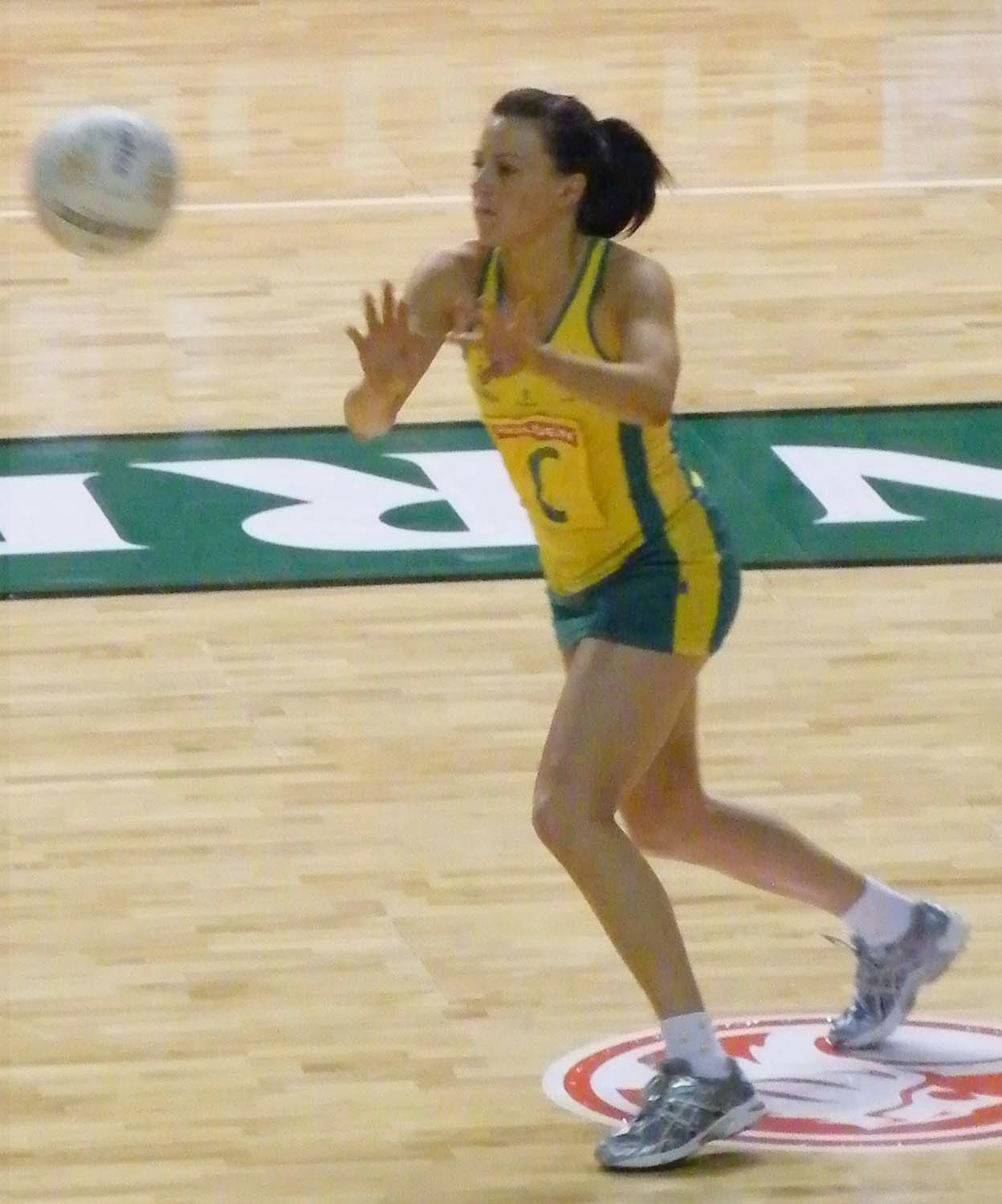
Natalie von Bertouch captained Adelaide Thunderbirds to the 2010 and 2013 ANZ Championships. 2010 Liz Ellis Diamond winner and 2009 and 2010 Australian ANZ Championship Player of the Year.

Between 2008 and 2016, Netball Australia also had a separate award for best Australian player in the ANZ Championship.

Season	Winner	Team
2008	Catherine Cox	New South Wales Swifts
2009	Natalie von Bertouch	Adelaide Thunderbirds
2010	Natalie von Bertouch	Adelaide Thunderbirds
2011	Laura Geitz	Queensland Firebirds
2012	Madison Browne	Melbourne Vixens
2013	Erin Bell	Adelaide Thunderbirds
2014	Laura Geitz	Queensland Firebirds
2015	Sharni Layton	New South Wales Swifts
2016	Sharni Layton	New South Wales Swifts

== New Zealand Netball Awards ==
=== New Zealand ANZ Championship Player of the Year ===
Season	Winner	Team
2015	Laura Langman	Northern Mystics
2016	Gina Crampton	Southern Steel

== ANZ Championship top scorers ==
Season	Winner	Team	GS/GA/G%
2008	(New Zealand) Irene van Dyk	Waikato Bay of Plenty Magic	529/570 (93%)
2009			
2010	(Jamaica) Carla Borrego	Adelaide Thunderbirds	497/581 (86%)
2011	(Jamaica) Romelda Aiken	Queensland Firebirds	523/607 (86%)
2012	(New Zealand) Irene van Dyk	Waikato Bay of Plenty Magic	501/527 (95%)
2013	(Jamaica) Jhaniele Fowler	Southern Steel	606/648 (94%)
2014	(Malawi) Mwai Kumwenda	Mainland Tactix	540/595 (91%)
2015	(Jamaica) Romelda Aiken	Queensland Firebirds	648/779 (83%)
2016			

== ANZ Championship winning captains ==
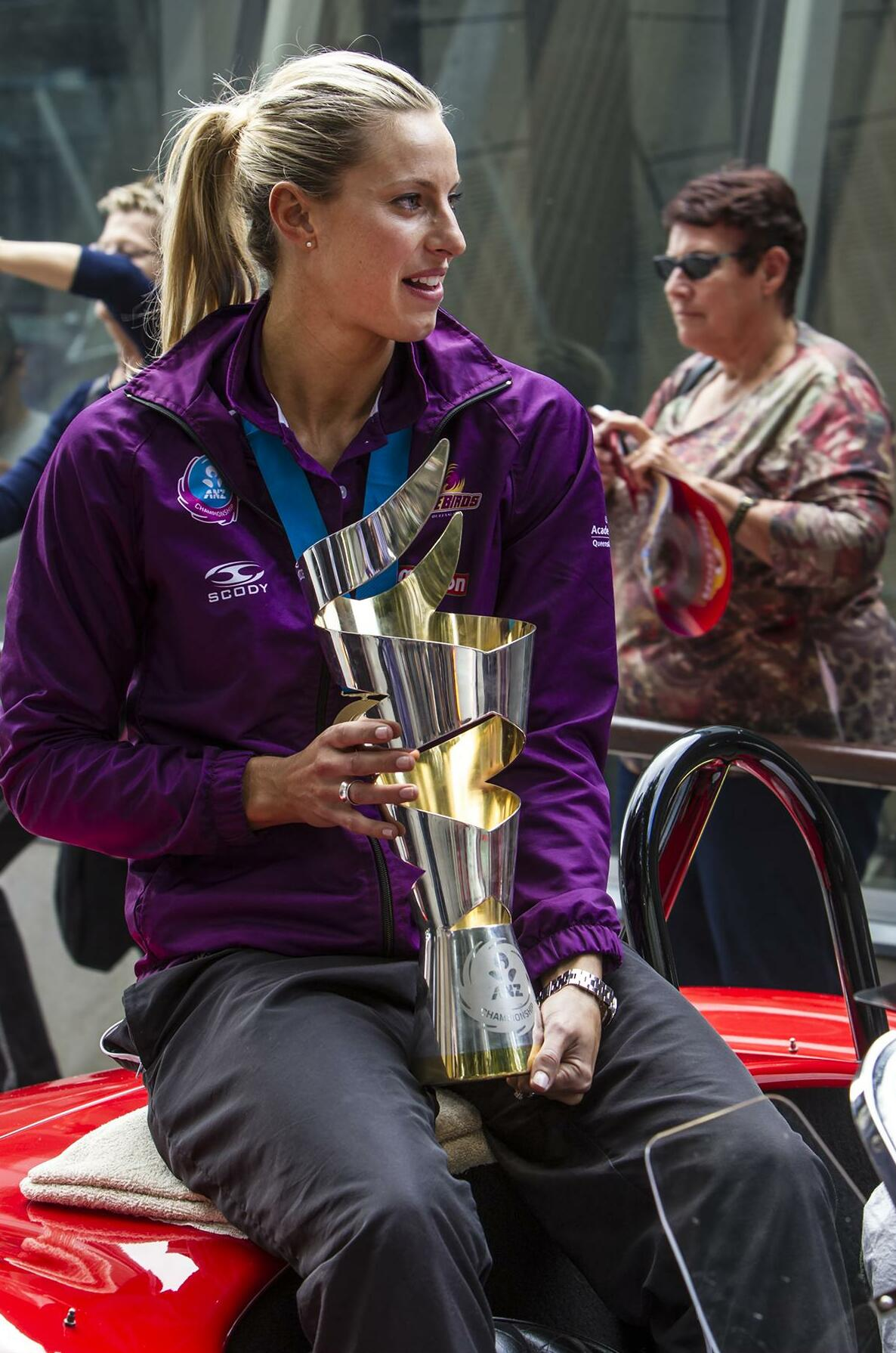
Laura Geitz captained Queensland Firebirds to three ANZ Championships in 2011, 2015 and 2016

Season	Winner	Team
2008	Catherine Cox	New South Wales Swifts
2009	Bianca Chatfield ^{(Note 8)}	Melbourne Vixens
2009	Sharelle McMahon ^{(Note 8)}	Melbourne Vixens
2010	Natalie von Bertouch ^{(Note 9)}	Adelaide Thunderbirds
2010	Mo'onia Gerrard ^{(Note 9)}	Adelaide Thunderbirds
2011	Lauren Nourse ^{(Note 10)}	Queensland Firebirds
2011	Laura Geitz ^{(Note 10)}	Queensland Firebirds
2012	Laura Langman	Waikato Bay of Plenty Magic
2013	Natalie von Bertouch	Adelaide Thunderbirds
2014	Bianca Chatfield	Melbourne Vixens
2015	Laura Geitz	Queensland Firebirds
2016	Laura Geitz	Queensland Firebirds

Notes

- ^8 In 2009, Bianca Chatfield and Sharelle McMahon were co-captains.
- ^9 In 2010, Natalie von Bertouch and Mo'onia Gerrard were co-captains.
- ^10 In 2011, Lauren Nourse captained Firebirds to the minor premiership but was injured for the play-offs. Laura Geitz captained Firebirds in the grand final.

== ANZ Championship players with three winners medals ==
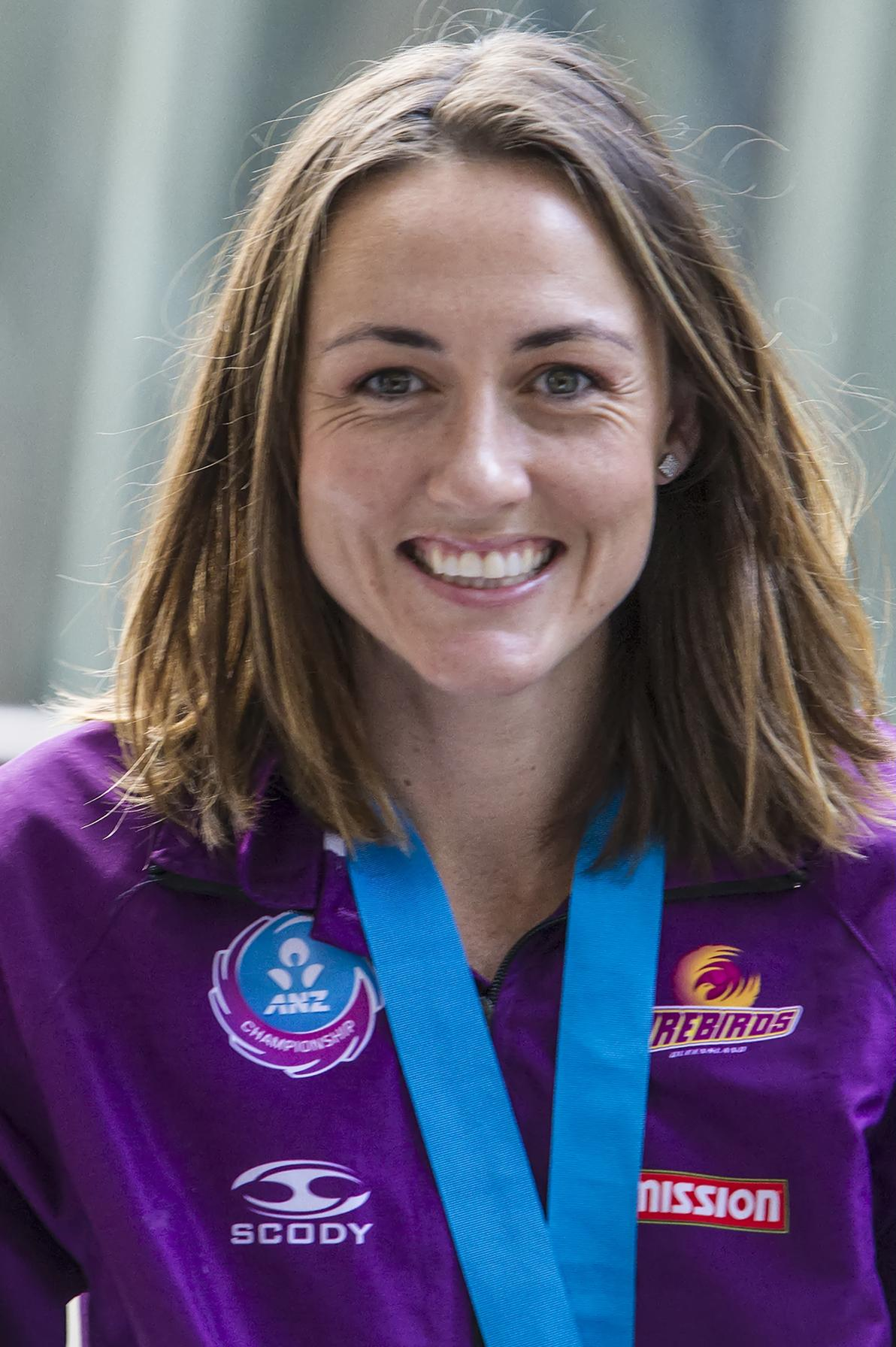
Rebecca Bulley won three ANZ Championship winners medals with three different teams.

Players	Season/Teams
Erin Bell	2008 New South Wales Swifts; 2010 Adelaide Thunderbirds; 2013 Adelaide Thunderbirds
Rebecca Bulley	2008 New South Wales Swifts; 2013 Adelaide Thunderbirds; 2015 Queensland Firebirds
Caitlyn Nevins	2014 Melbourne Vixens; 2015 Queensland Firebirds; 2016 Queensland Firebirds
Romelda Aiken	2011, 2015, 2016 Queensland Firebirds
Laura Geitz	2011, 2015, 2016 Queensland Firebirds
Clare McMeniman	2011, 2015, 2016 Queensland Firebirds

== Gallery ==
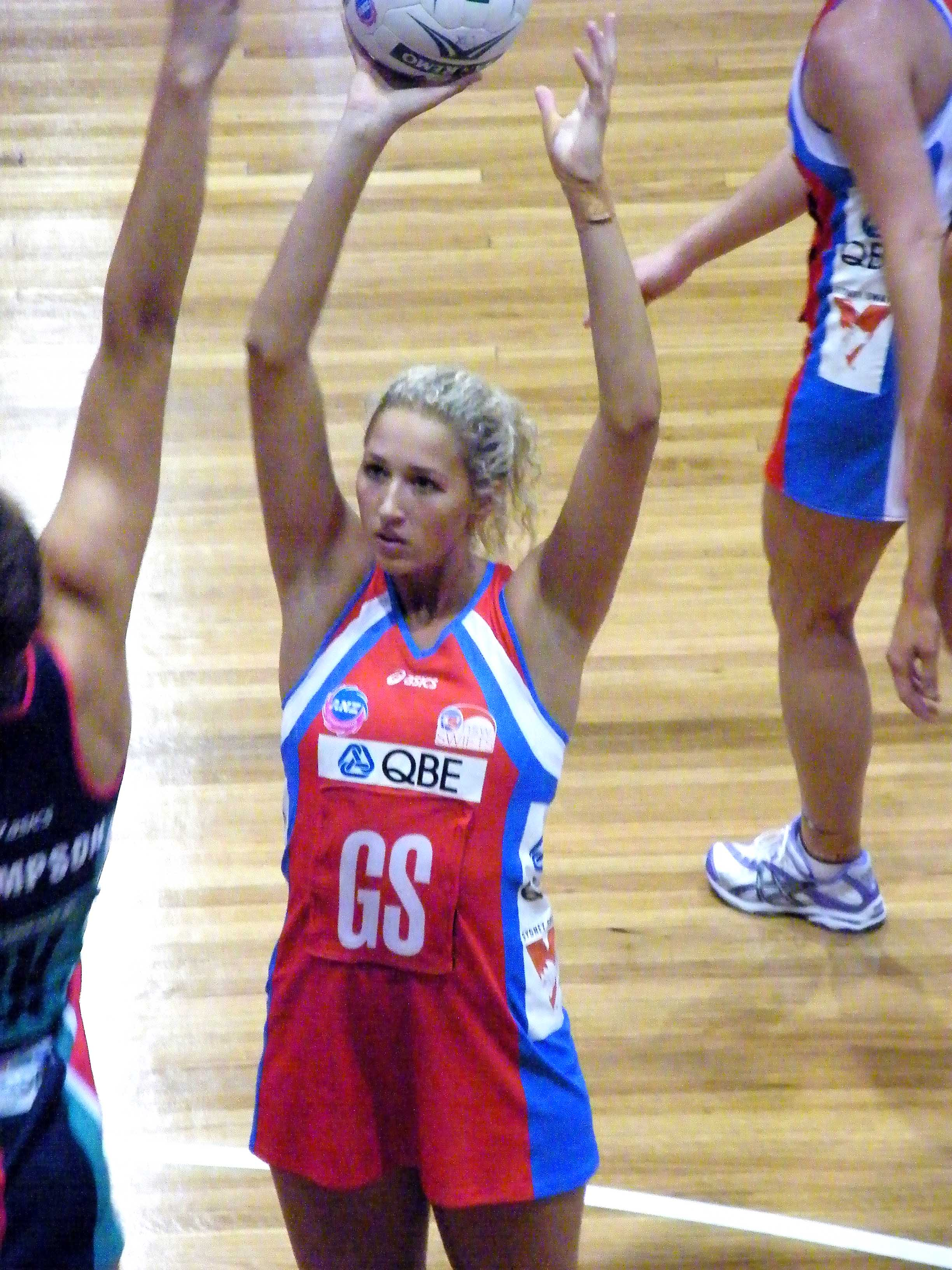
Erin Bell was a member of three ANZ Championship winning squads, the 2008 New South Wales Swifts and the 2010 and 2013 Adelaide Thunderbirds.

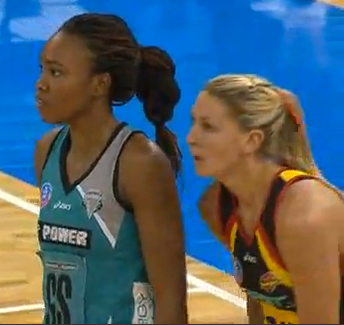
Carla Borrego (Adelaide Thunderbirds) was the top scorer during the 2010 ANZ Championship season.
