= Erena Mikaere =

New Zealand netball international

Personal information
- Full name: Erena Mikaere
- Born: 9 July 1988 (age 38) Rotorua
- Height: 1.92 m (6 ft 4 in)
- School: Rotorua Lakes High School

Netball career
- Playing positions: GK, GD, WD
Years	Club team	Apps
2011–2013	Waikato Bay of Plenty Magic	5
2013–2014	Southern Steel	5
2014–2016	West Coast Fever	19
2016	→ Western Sting	
2017–2018	Sunshine Coast Lightning	15
2017	→ Team Northumbria	
2019	Northern Mystics	15
2020–	Waikato Bay of Plenty Magic	
Years	National team	Caps
2019–	New Zealand	2

Erena Mikaere (born 9 July 1988) is a New Zealand netball international. Mikaere was a member of three premiership winning teams. She was a prominent member of the Sunshine Coast Lightning teams that won the 2017 and 2018 Suncorp Super Netball titles. She was also a fringe member of the 2012 Waikato Bay of Plenty Magic team that won the ANZ Championship title. During the ANZ Championship era, she also played for Southern Steel and West Coast Fever. She was the first New Zealand player to play for an Australian ANZ Championship team. During the ANZ Premiership era, she has played for Northern Mystics and Waikato Bay of Plenty Magic.

== Early life, family and education ==
Mikaere is a Māori with Te Arawa and Tūhourangi affiliations. She was born in Rotorua. She also has Scottish ancestry on her mother's side. Her parents are Brenda and Kerry. She attended Rotorua Lakes High School. While playing for Waikato Bay of Plenty Magic, Southern Steel and West Coast Fever, Mikaere was in a relationship with William Creighton. They lived together in Invercargill and Western Australia. In October 2009, Mikaere gave birth to a daughter, Bileigh Creighton.

== Playing career ==
=== ANZ Championship ===
==== Waikato Bay of Plenty Magic ====
Between 2011 and 2013, Mikaere was included in Waikato Bay of Plenty Magic squads for the ANZ Championship. She was a member of Noeline Taurua's 2012 Waikato Bay of Plenty Magic team that won the ANZ Championship title. In three seasons at Magic, Mikaere played just 31 minutes and 13 seconds, spread across five matches. She was kept out of the team by Casey Kopua and Leana de Bruin.

==== Southern Steel ====
Ahead of the 2014 ANZ Championship season, Mikaere signed for Southern Steel. However, much of Mikaere's 2014 season was spent watching from the bench with the likes of Rachel Rasmussen, Phoenix Karaka and Storm Purvis keeping her out of the team. She made just five appearances for Steel.

==== West Coast Fever ====
In 2015 and 2016, Mikaere played for West Coast Fever. She was the first New Zealand player to play for an Australian ANZ Championship team. While playing for Fever, Mikaere also played for Western Sting in the Australian Netball League.

=== Sunshine Coast Lightning ===
Ahead of the inaugural 2017 Suncorp Super Netball season, Mikaere joined Sunshine Coast Lightning. Reuniting with Noeline Taurua, she was subsequently a prominent member of the Lightning teams that won the 2017 and 2018 Suncorp Super Netball titles. Mikaere made 15 senior appearances for Lightning. While playing for Lightning, Mikaere guested for and captained Team Northumbria in the 2017 British Fast5 Netball All-Stars Championship.

=== ANZ Championship ===
==== Northern Mystics ====
Ahead of the 2019 ANZ Premiership season, Mikaere signed for Northern Mystics. She made 15 appearances for Mystics.

==== Waikato Bay of Plenty Magic ====
Since 2020, Mikaere has played for Waikato Bay of Plenty Magic. On 1 June 2022, in a match against Northern Stars, Mikaere made her 100th senior league appearance.

==== Statistics ====
Season	Team	G/A	GA	RB	CPR	FD	IC	DF	PN	TO	MP
2019	Mystics	0/0	0	23	8	1	35	68	149	16	15
2020	Magic	0/0	0	21	14	1	12	53	137	11	13
2021	Magic	0/0	0	9	38	0	11	63	177	12	15
2022	Magic	0/0	?	20	7	0	9	60	144	7	14
Career											

=== New Zealand ===
On 13 January 2019, Mikaere made her senior debut for New Zealand against England during the 2019 Netball Quad Series. She came on as a replacement for Jane Watson in the third quarter. Mikaere has also played for New Zealand A and Mixed Invitational teams in the Cadbury Netball Series. It would be another five years before she made her second senior appearance. On 6 October 2024, after being called up as a replacement for Phoenix Karaka, Mikaere played in the 2024 Taini Jamison Trophy Series. She was subsequently included in squads for both the 2024 Constellation Cup and the 2024 Fast5 Netball World Series.

Tournaments	Place
2019 Netball Quad Series	3rd
2024 Taini Jamison Trophy Series	2nd
2024 Constellation Cup	1st
2024 Fast5 Netball World Series	2nd

== Television ==
Mikaere has worked as television presenter for Whakaata Māori. Together with Stacey Fluhler and Liam Messam, she hosts Te Ao Toa, a sports show with a Māori perspective.

== Honours ==
Sunshine Coast Lightning

- Suncorp Super Netball
  - Winners: 2017, 2018
  - Runners Up: 2019
  - Minor Premierships: 2019

Waikato Bay of Plenty Magic

- ANZ Championship
  - Winners: 2012
