= Shannon Saunders (netball) =

New Zealand netball player

Personal information
- Full name: Née: Francois
- Born: 12 October 1990 (age 35)
- Height: 1.76 m (5 ft 9 1/2 in)
- Spouse: (m. 2019)
- University: University of Otago

Netball career
- Playing positions: WA, C, GA
Years	Club team	Apps
2012–present	Southern Steel	
Years	National team	Caps
2011–present	New Zealand	91
Medal record
Representing New Zealand
INF Netball World Cup
Gold medal – first place	2019 Liverpool	Netball
Silver medal – second place	2015 Sydney	Netball
Commonwealth Games
Silver medal – second place	2014 Glasgow	Netball
Bronze medal – third place	2022 Birmingham	Team
- Updated on 11 November 2011

Shannon Saunders (née Francois, born 12 October 1990) is a New Zealand netball player, who is currently contracted to the Southern Steel in the trans-Tasman ANZ Championship. Saunders, who is a predominantly a midcourter has played for Otago in the National Provincial Championships since 2010. She made the New Zealand under 21 squad in 2011 and played against Australia in three tests. She was later named in the FastNet Ferns squad to compete the World Netball Series, in Liverpool in late November. Saunders joined Silver Fern players Irene van Dyk, Maria Tutaia and Katrina Grant in the side.

She was named in the Silver Ferns for the Australian leg of the 2012 Quad Series, although she was not capped.

While playing international netball, Saunders completed a Bachelor of Pharmacy degree at the University of Otago graduating in 2012.

Shannon was also an exceptional sprinter while at school.

== Netball career ==
Saunders started with the Southern Steel in 2012 as a midcourter and was captain in the 2021 ANZ Premiership season. Saunders played her 150th game for Steel in the 2022 ANZ Premiership season, this marked only the third time a player had done this behind Casey Williams and Wendy Frew.

== Personal life ==
Saunders was selected for the 2022 Commonwealth Games in Birmingham and announced her pregnancy shortly after in August 2022.
