= Margaret Foster =

New Zealand netball player and coach

Margaret Foster MNZM
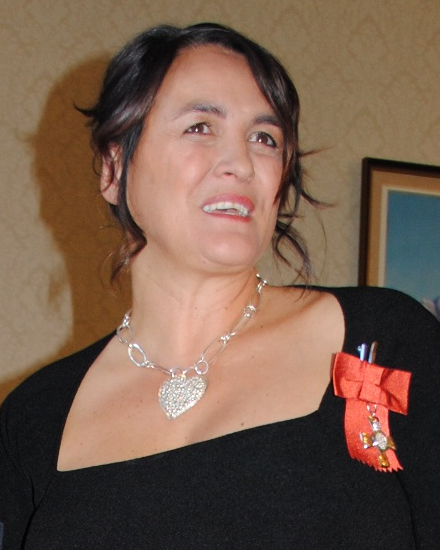
- Foster in 2010

Personal information
- Full name: Margaret Mary Anne Foster (Née: Bray)
- Occupation: Netball coach

Netball career
- Playing positions: WA, C
Years	Club team	Apps
1986–1999; 2001	Canterbury Hearts/Flames	
Years	National team	Caps
1992–1994; 1997	New Zealand	7
Coaching career
- Years: Team
- 2000; 2002–07: Canterbury Flames
- 2009: Southern Steel
- 2011: Waikato Bay of Plenty Magic (asst)
- Updated on 5 November 2010

Margaret Mary Anne Foster MNZM (née Bray) is a New Zealand netball coach and former Silver Ferns player. Foster played 14 international matches from 1992 to 1997. She played domestic netball in the National Bank Cup for the Canterbury Flames, playing in 1998, 1999 and 2001. She also played for Canterbury for over ten years, and played one season for Wellington.

== Coaching career ==
Foster also coached the team in 2000 and from 2002 to 2007. Foster took the Canterbury Flames to five final appearances, losing each time to the Southland-based Southern Sting. She also previously coached the New Zealand A squad. Foster was also a Silver Ferns selector, the sports analyst for the Silver Ferns at the Commonwealth Games, Manchester and the Netball World Cup, Jamaica where NZ won.

After the National Bank Cup was replaced by the ANZ Championship in April 2008, Foster was replaced as coach of the Christchurch-based Canterbury franchise. She pulled out of an offer to be head coach of the Northern Mystics, after Yvonne Willering was sacked from the position. Instead, Foster took up the role of assistant coach of the Southern Steel for the 2009 season. She subsequently signed on as assistant coach of the Waikato Bay of Plenty Magic for the 2011 season. She was also appointed head coach for the Cook Islands netball squad for 2011 and took them to the South Pacific Series. Foster also coached Loughborough Lightning in Netball Superleague. She also designed a high performance programme and ran coach workshops in St Lucia, and Hong Kong. Foster has also been an international coach assisting the Sri Lankan National team. Foster owns a coaching company in Canterbury called Motivationz Netball. This academy provides coaching for young children from 8 to 16 years of age.

== Outside of netball ==
Foster was diagnosed with breast cancer in 2006. She later wrote a book, Silver Linings, about both her career and battle with cancer. Foster is the ambassador for the New Zealand Breast Cancer Foundation, and has been guest speaker throughout New Zealand inspiring other people. In the 2009 Queen's Birthday Honours, Foster was appointed a Member of the New Zealand Order of Merit, for services to sport, in particular netball.
