= Amber Bellringer =

New Zealand netball player

Personal information
- Born: 5 June 1990 (age 36) Taranaki, New Zealand
- Height: 1.84 m (6 ft 0 in)

Netball career
- Playing positions: GS, GA
- Updated on 12 April 2009

Amber Bellringer (born 5 June 1990 in Taranaki, New Zealand) is a New Zealand netball player. Bellringer played in the National Bank Cup for the Western Flyers in 2006 and 2007. With the start of the ANZ Championship, she played for the Central Pulse in the 2008 season, but was not signed for the 2009 season and in 2011 got signed back by the Central Pulse.
