= Laura Geitz =

Australian netball player

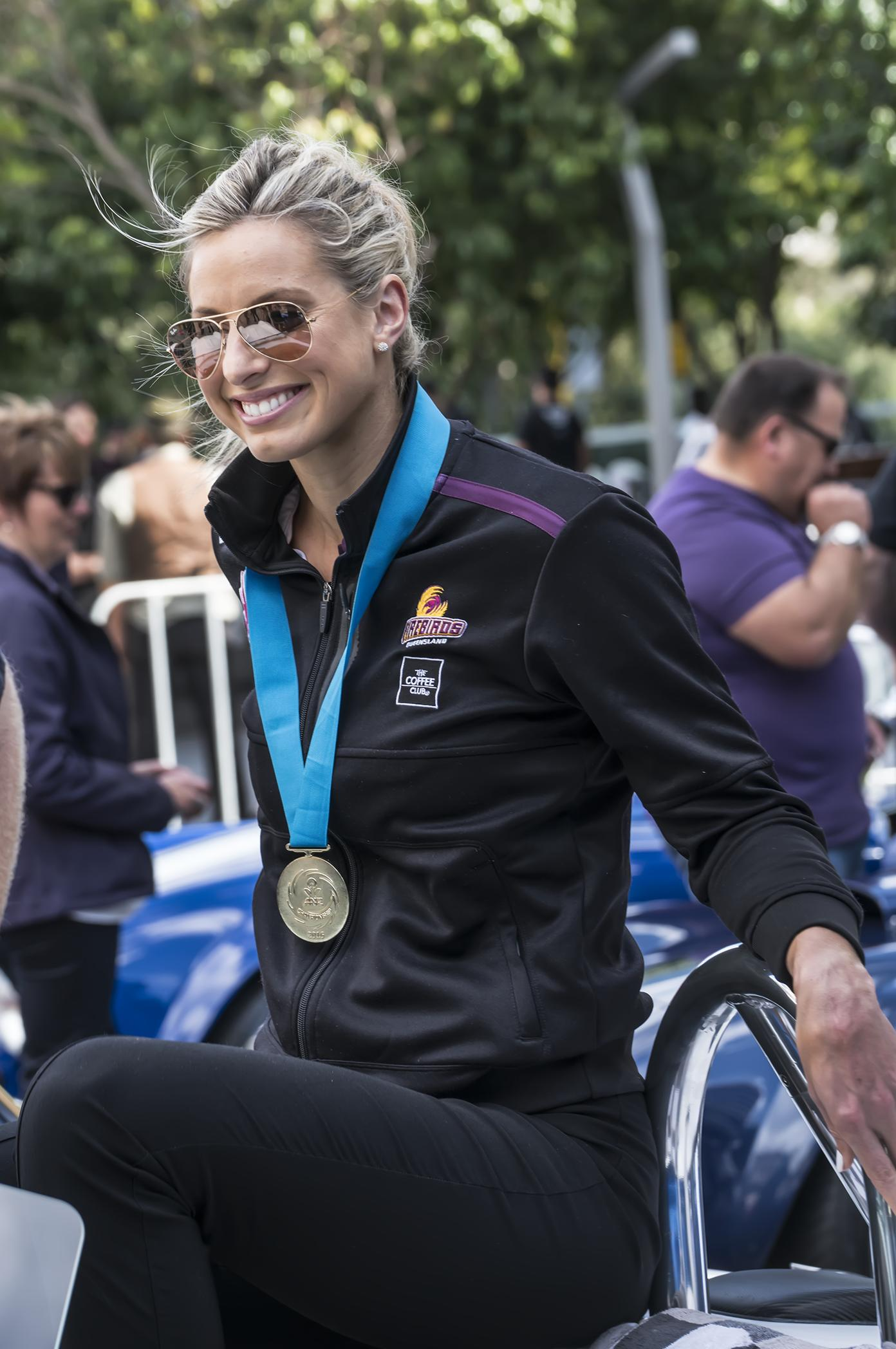
- Geitz in 2016

Personal information
- Full name: Laura Nicole Geitz
- Born: 4 November 1987 (age 39) Ipswich, Queensland, Australia
- Height: 190 cm (6 ft 3 in)
- Spouse: Mark Gilbride
- School: The Scots PGC College
- University: Queensland University of Technology

Netball career
- Playing positions: GK, GD
Years	Club team	Apps
2008–2018	Queensland Firebirds	169
Years	National team	Caps
2008–2018	Australia	71
Medal record
Representing Australia
Netball World Championships
Gold medal – first place	2011 Singapore	Netball
Gold medal – first place	2015 Australia	Netball
Commonwealth Games
Silver medal – second place	2010 Delhi	Netball
Gold medal – first place	2014 Glasgow	Netball
Silver medal – second place	2018 Gold Coast	Netball
- Updated on 16 April 2018

Laura Geitz (born 4 November 1987) is an Australian former netball player and former captain of the Australian national team. Geitz was selected for the 2008 Australian national team, and has won a silver medal at the 2010 Commonwealth Games, a gold medal at the 2011 World Netball Championships and a gold medal at the 2014 Commonwealth Games as captain. In domestic netball, Geitz played for the Queensland Firebirds in the ANZ Championship. She previously captained the AIS Canberra Darters in the Commonwealth Bank Trophy.

== Personal life ==
Geitz grew up in Allora, Queensland in the Darling Downs region. Her forebears Adam and Annie Geitz settled in the region, after migrating from Germany in 1872. Geitz gave birth to a son on 25 February 2017.

== Career ==
In 2011, Geitz played a major role for the Queensland Firebirds in their undefeated ANZ Championship win. In addition, Geitz was part of the Diamonds squad for the 2011 Netball World Championships in Singapore. Although Geitz did not play as Goal Keeper in the first half against New Zealand (Susan Fuhrmann played Goal Keeper for the first half), her impact helped recover a six-goal deficit to force the match into overtime. This move proved to be successful as the Diamonds prevailed over their rivals in a one-goal victory.

Geitz was honoured with the Liz Ellis Diamond in 2011. She has 32 Test Caps for Australia.

In 2013, she led the Australian team for the first time, winning the 2013 Constellation Cup against New Zealand. In 2014, Geitz was named captain of the Australian Netball Team to compete at the 2014 Commonwealth Games. Under her captaincy the team defeated the New Zealand National Netball Team in the gold medal match, ending Australia's 12-year gold medal drought at the Commonwealth Games. In 2015, Geitz captained the Queensland Firebirds to the championship, winning over the New South Wales Swifts to secure the ANZ Championship for that season.

Geitz remained at the Firebirds through the first two seasons of the new Suncorp Super Netball league. She announced her retirement from international team duties in July 2018, having been capped 71 times for her country. Later that year, Geitz retired from domestic netball as well, ending her career with 169 domestic league caps and two Player of the Year awards (2011 and 2014) in the old ANZ Championship competition.

== Honours ==
In May 2017, a bronze statue depicting Geitz was officially unveiled by Queensland premier Annastacia Palaszczuk at the Brisbane Entertainment Centre in Boondall. The statue was created by sculptor Liam Hardy who spent 700 hours carving out a likeness of Geitz, depicting her on her toe tips with her right arm stretched for a fingertip touch of the ball.

In 2020, it was announced a 4-foot tall statuette, a replica of the full sized bronze statue, would be unveiled in her hometown of Allora. However, before its official unveiling at Allora's sports museum, the statuette was allegedly damaged by vandals and the ball that Geitz was depicted as touching which was allegedly pried from the statue and stolen.

In 2025, she was inducted into Sport Australia Hall of Fame as athlete member.
