= Jamilah Gupwell =

New Zealand netball player

Jamilah Kahurangi Gupwell
Personal information
- Full name: Jamilah Palu (Née: Jamilah) Gupwell
- Born: 7 July 1986 (age 40) New Plymouth, New Zealand
- Height: 1.74 m (5 ft 9 in)
- Spouse: Tomasi Palu (m. 2015)
- School: New Plymouth Girls' High School
- University: Victoria University of Wellington

Netball career
- Playing positions: GA, GS, WA
Years	Club team	Apps
2005–07	Capital Shakers	
2008–2010, 2012	Central Pulse	
2011	Waikato Bay of Plenty Magic	
Years	National team	Caps
2006–07	New Zealand U21	
- Updated on 23 March 2010

Jamilah Gupwell (born 7 July 1986 in New Plymouth, New Zealand) is a New Zealand netball player.

She played three years with the Capital Shakers (2005–07) in the National Bank Cup.

She was also a member of the New Zealand U21 team from 2006 to 2007.

Gupwell signed with the Central Pulse for the inaugural ANZ Championship in 2008. Despite a winless season that year, she was one only a few players retained for the 2009 season. Gupwell continues to play with the Central Pulse in 2010.

She then moved up to Mount Maunganui for the 2011 ANZ Championship season to play for the Waikato Bay of Plenty Magic, where the team placed third after losing the preliminary final vs Northern Mystics.

For 2012, Gupwell moved back to Wellington to play one more season for the Central Pulse. She then married Tomasi Palu (Tongan International Rugby player and Wellington Lions Rugby player) on 6 June 2015, and they have three daughters.
