= Southern Steel (netball) =

New Zealand netball team

- Founded: 2007
- Based in: Invercargill
- Regions: Southland/Otago
- Home venue: Stadium Southland
- Head coach: Wendy Frew
- Captain: Kimiora Poi; Kate Heffernan
- Premierships: 2 (2017, 2018)
- League: ANZ Premiership
- Website: southernsteel.co.nz
Uniform
Uniform

Southern Steel are a New Zealand netball team based in Invercargill. Between 2008 and 2016, they played in the ANZ Championship. Since 2017 they have represented Netball South in the ANZ Premiership. Netball South is the governing body that represents Southland and Otago. In 2017 they won their first premiership when they were the inaugural ANZ Premiership winners. In 2018 they won their second premiership when they retained the title. In 2017 Steel were the inaugural winners of the Netball New Zealand Super Club tournament.

== History ==
=== Formation ===
Southern Steel was formed in 2007. The new team was effectively a merger of the two former National Bank Cup teams, Southern Sting and Otago Rebels. Steel subsequently became founder members of the ANZ Championship. Ahead of the 2008 ANZ Championship season, Robyn Broughton was appointed the team's first head coach and Jenny-May Coffin and Megan Hutton were named as co-captains.

=== ANZ Championship ===
Between 2008 and 2016, Southern Steel played in the ANZ Championship. In both 2009 and 2010, Steel finished 4th during the regular season and qualified for the playoffs. However on both occasions they failed to progress beyond the semifinals. Steel's best performance during the ANZ Championship era came in 2016. With a team coached by Noeline Taurua, captained by Wendy Frew and featuring Gina Crampton, Jhaniele Fowler-Reid, Shannon Francois, and Jane Watson, Steel finished the season as minor premiers. However, they subsequently lost the New Zealand Conference Final to Waikato Bay of Plenty Magic and were defeated in the semifinals by Queensland Firebirds.

Regular season statistics

Season	Position	Won	Drawn	Lost
2008	6th	7	0	6
2009	4th	8	0	5
2010	4th	8	0	5
2011	7th	4	0	9
2012	9th	2	0	11
2013	6th	6	0	7
2014	5th	7	0	6
2015	8th	3	2	8
2016	1st	11	2	0

Minor Premiership

=== ANZ Premiership ===
Since 2017, Steel have played in the ANZ Premiership. With a team coached by Reinga Bloxham, captained by Wendy Frew and featuring Gina Crampton, Jhaniele Fowler-Reid, Shannon Francois, and Jane Watson, Steel finished the 2017 season as inaugural ANZ Premiership winners. After finishing the regular season unbeaten and as minor premiers, Steel defeated Central Pulse 69–53 in the grand final. This saw Steel complete a 16 match unbeaten season. However, Steel's perfect season was almost derailed on 12 June when a van with six of their players on board was involved in a road traffic accident in Fendalton, Christchurch. Four of the players were injured. Wendy Frew received over seventy stitches and underwent surgery while Te Paea Selby-Rickit suffered a dual fractured rib. Shannon Francois and Jhaniele Fowler-Reid had minor injuries. Just two days later, on 14 June, with the four injured players replaced by four players recruited from their Beko Netball League team, Steel notched up win number 14 of the season against Mainland Tactix. Despite been 41–38 down after three quarters, Steel launched a comeback in the fourth quarter to win 51–46.

Steel remained unbeaten as they went onto win the 2017 Netball New Zealand Super Club tournament, defeating Northern Mystics 79–58 in the final. The run continued into the 2018 season. However after defeating Mystics in their opening match, they were beaten 62–51 by Pulse, ending a 22–match win streak. The streak included 17 ANZ Premiership matches and five Super Club matches. Despite this and despite losing two key players, Jhaniele Fowler-Reid and Jane Watson, Steel went onto to retain their title. In the 2018 grand final they again defeated Pulse.

Regular season statistics

Season	Position	Won	Drawn	Lost
2017	1st	15	0	0
2018	2nd	10	0	5
2019	2nd	12	0	3
2020	5th	4	1	10
2021	2nd	11	0	4
2022	4th	6	0	9
2023	6th	0	0	15
2024	6th	2	0	13
2025	4th	5	0	5
2026	2nd	8	0	2

Minor Premiers and Premiership
Premiership

== Grand finals ==
ANZ Premiership

Season	Winners	Score	Runners up	Venue
2017	Southern Steel	69–53	Central Pulse	Stadium Southland
2018	Southern Steel	54–53	Central Pulse	Fly Palmy Arena
2026	Southern Steel	46–56	Northern Mystics	Trusts Arena

Netball New Zealand Super Club

Season	Winners	Score	Runners up	Venue
2017	Southern Steel	79–58	Northern Mystics	Trafalgar Centre

== Home venues ==
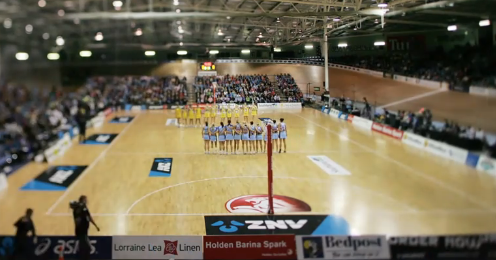
Between 2011 and 2013, Invercargill ILT Velodrome served as Steel's temporary home.

Steel's main home venue is Stadium Southland. They also play some home games at Dunedin's Edgar Centre. During the 2011, 2012 and 2013 seasons, while Stadium Southland was unavailable following a roof collapse in September 2010, Steel played their Invercargill home games at the ILT Velodrome.

	Years
Stadium Southland	2008–2010, 2014–
Edgar Centre	2008–
ILT Velodrome	2011–2013

== Notable players ==
=== 2026 squad ===
2026 Southern Steel roster
Players
Coaching staff

Nat.	Name	Position(s)	DoB	Height
(New Zealand)	Aliyah Dunn	GS	19 October 1999 (age 27)	1.90 m (6 ft 3 in)
(New Zealand)	Georgia Heffernan	GS, GA	7 October 1999 (age 27)	1.81 m (5 ft 11 in)
(New Zealand)	Serina Daunakamakama	WA	11 February 2004 (age 22)	1.69 m (5 ft 7 in)
(New Zealand)	Kimiora Poi (vc)	WA, C	1 November 1997 (age 29)	1.69 m (5 ft 7 in)
(New Zealand)	Renee Savai'inaea	C, WD	15 July 2000 (age 26)	1.79 m (5 ft 10 in)
(New Zealand)	Khanye’-Lii Munro-Nonoa	WD, GD	9 September 2004 (age 22)	1.82 m (6 ft 0 in)
(New Zealand)	Carys Stythe	GD, GK	18 June 2003 (age 23)	1.92 m (6 ft 4 in)
(New Zealand)	Ashleigh Poi	C, WA, WD	25 October 2002 (age 24)	1.73 m (5 ft 8 in)
(Australia)	Josie Bingham	GA,GS,WA	27 January 2000 (age 26)	1.76 m (5 ft 9 in)
(Australia)	Jess Milne	GD,WD,GK	4 August 2001 (age 25)	1.86 m (6 ft 1 in)

Head coach

- Wendy Frew

Assistant coach

- Liana Leota

Manager: Dayna Kaio
Physiotherapist: Stacey Allan
Strength and conditioning: Josie McKerchar

Notes

- (c) – Captain
- (cc) – Co-captain
- (vc) – Vice-captain
- – Injury / maternity leave
- (TRP) – Temporary Replacement Player
Player profiles: Team website
Last updated: 19 February 2026

=== Internationals ===
New Zealand

- Jodi Brown
- Aliyah Dunn
- Jenny-May Coffin
- Gina Crampton
- Tania Dalton
- Leana de Bruin
- Wendy Frew
- Paula Griffin
- Ellen Halpenny
- Georgia Heffernan
- Kate Heffernan
- Phoenix Karaka
- Liana Leota
- Tiana Metuarau
- Kimiora Poi
- Storm Purvis
- Katrina Rore
- Shannon Saunders
- Sheryl Scanlan
- Te Huinga Reo Selby-Rickit
- Te Paea Selby-Rickit
- Carys Stythe
- Courtney Tairi
- Sulu Tone-Fitzpatrick
- Jane Watson
- Debbie White
- Donna Wilkins
- Adine Wilson
- Samantha Winders
- Daneka Wipiiti

New Zealand Fast5

- Rachel Rasmussen
- Hayley Saunders

Australia

- Natasha Chokljat
- Megan Dehn
- Demelza McCloud

England

- George Fisher

Jamaica

- Jhaniele Fowler
- Malysha Kelly

Samoa

- Julianna Naoupu
- Rachel Rasmussen
- Sheryl Scanlan
- Saviour Tui

South Africa

- Leana de Bruin
- Lenize Potgieter
- Jeanté Strydom

Trinidad and Tobago

- Kalifa McCollin

=== Captains ===
	Years
Jenny-May Coffin	2008
Megan Hutton	2008
Adine Wilson	2009
Megan Dehn	2010
Wendy Frew	2011
Liana Leota	2011
Jodi Brown	2012–2014
Wendy Frew	2015–2018
Gina Crampton	2019–2020
Te Huinga Reo Selby-Rickit	2019–2020
Shannon Saunders	2021–2022
Te Huinga Reo Selby-Rickit	2023
Kate Heffernan	2024
Kate Heffernan	2025
Kimiora Poi	2025
Kimiora Poi	2026

=== Award winners ===
==== ANZ Championship awards ====
ANZ Championship MVP

Season	Player
2010	Liana Barrett-Chase
2011	Leana de Bruin ^{(Note 1)}
2013	Jhaniele Fowler
2015	Jhaniele Fowler ^{(Note 2)}
2016	Jhaniele Fowler ^{(Note 2)}

Notes

- ^1 Leana de Bruin shared the 2011 award with Natalie Medhurst (Queensland Firebirds).
- ^2 In 2015 and 2016 Jhaniele Fowler was the MVP player in the New Zealand Conference.

ANZ Championship Best New Talent

Season	Player
2013	Jhaniele Fowler

==== New Zealand Netball Awards ====
New Zealand ANZ Championship Player of the Year

Season	Winner
2016	Gina Crampton

ANZ Premiership Player of the Year

Season	Winner
2017	Jane Watson
2019	Gina Crampton

== Coaches ==
=== Head coaches ===
Coach	Years
Robyn Broughton	2008–2011
Janine Southby	2012–2015 ^{(Note 3)}
Natalie Avellino	2012 ^{(Note 3)}
Noeline Taurua	2015–2016
Reinga Bloxham	2016– 2024
Wendy Frew	2024–

Notes

- ^3 Janine Southby and Natalie Avellino were co-head coaches for the 2012 season

=== Assistant coaches ===
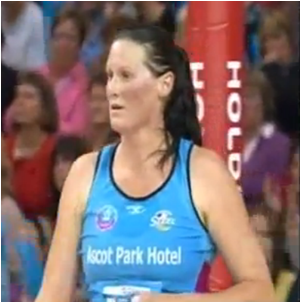
Donna Wilkins: 2008 Southern Steel assistant coach, 2012 Southern Steel player.

Coach	Years
Donna Wilkins	2008
Margaret Foster	2009
Jo Cunningham	2010–2011
Natalie Avellino	2012–2013
Reinga Te Huia	2014–2016
Lauren Piebenga	2017–

== Reserve team ==
Since 2016, Netball South have entered a team in the National Netball League. They are effectively the reserve team of Southern Steel. They originally played simply as Netball South before becoming known as Southern Blast. In 2016, Netball South won the inaugural NNL title after defeating Central Zone 51–46 in the grand final. At the 2016 New Zealand Netball Awards, Netball South winning the inaugural title was named Moment of the Year.

== Honours ==
- ANZ Premiership
  - Winners: 2017, 2018
  - Runners Up: 2026
  - Minor premiers: 2017
- ANZ Championship
  - Minor premiers: 2016
- Netball New Zealand Super Club
  - Winners: 2017
