= Julianna Naoupu =

Samoan New Zealander (born 1990)

Personal information
- Born: 1 March 1990 (age 36) Christchurch, New Zealand
- Height: 1.76 m (5 ft 9 in)
- Relatives: George Naoupu (brother); Sene Naoupu (sister-in-law)

Netball career
- Playing positions: GS, GA
Years	Club team	Apps
2013 2008-2010	Waikato Bay of Plenty Magic; Canterbury Tactix; Southern Steel; Canterbury Flames	
Years	National team	Caps
2015 2010	Samoa; New Zealand U21	

Julianna Naoupu (born 1 March 1990) is a Samoan New Zealander who played for the Samoa national netball team and who plays in the ANZ Championship for the Waikato Bay of Plenty Magic.

== Career ==
She was a member of the Silver Ferns wider training squad since 2011, and played previously for the Southern Steel from 2008 to 2010, and prior to that, the Canterbury Flames in the National Bank Cup. She was widely expected to make the Silver Ferns after a solid season in 2012, but chronic knee problems kept her out of the side and left her needing surgery.

She will be moving to the Canterbury Tactix for the 2013 season of the ANZ Championship. Naoupu and her sister represented Samoa at the 2015 Netball World Cup.
