= 2011 ANZ Championship season =

Netball league season

- League: ANZ Championship
- Sport: Netball
- Duration: 13 February 2011 – 22 May 2011
- Teams: 10
- TV partner(s): One HD; Network 10; Sky Sport (New Zealand); TVNZ
- Champions: Queensland Firebirds
- Runners-up: Northern Mystics
- Minor premiers: Queensland Firebirds
- Season MVP: Leana de Bruin (Steel); Natalie Medhurst (Firebirds)
- Top scorer: Romelda Aiken (Firebirds)

ANZ Championship seasons
- ← 2010 2012 →

The 2011 ANZ Championship season was the fourth season of the ANZ Championship. The 2011 season began on 13 February and concluded on 22 May. With a team coached by Roselee Jencke, captained by Lauren Nourse and featuring Romelda Aiken, Laura Geitz, Clare McMeniman and Natalie Medhurst, Queensland Firebirds finished the season undefeated. They became the first team in the history of the ANZ Championship to go through the regular season and the playoffs without losing a single match. In the major semi-final, Firebirds defeated Waikato Bay of Plenty Magic and in the grand final they defeated Northern Mystics, winning their first premiership. This marked the beginning of a golden age for Firebirds. Between 2011 and 2016, Jencke guided them to five grand finals and three premierships.

== Transfers ==
Player	2010 team	2011 team
(Australia) Bianca Giteau	^{(Note 1)}	Adelaide Thunderbirds
(Australia) Cody Lange	Southern Force	Adelaide Thunderbirds
(Australia) Maddy Proud	Contax	Adelaide Thunderbirds
(Australia) Kara Richards	Melbourne Vixens	Adelaide Thunderbirds
(Australia) Kate Beveridge	Adelaide Thunderbirds	Melbourne Vixens
(Australia) Madison Browne	West Coast Fever	Melbourne Vixens
(England) Geva Mentor	Adelaide Thunderbirds	Melbourne Vixens
(Australia) Sarah Wall	Queensland Firebirds	Melbourne Vixens
(Australia) Carla Dziwoki	Leeds Carnegie	New South Wales Swifts
(Australia) Mo'onia Gerrard	Adelaide Thunderbirds	New South Wales Swifts
(Australia) Chelsea Pitman	Canterbury Tactix	Queensland Firebirds
(Australia) Ameliaranne Wells	Queensland Fusion	Queensland Firebirds
(England) Ama Agbeze	Central Pulse	West Coast Fever
(Australia) Courtney Bruce	Western Sting	West Coast Fever
(Australia) Alicia Janz	Western Sting	West Coast Fever
(Jamaica) Kasey Evering	Import	Canterbury Tactix
(New Zealand) Finau Pulu	Northern Mystics	Canterbury Tactix
(New Zealand) Donna Wilkins	^{(Note 2)}	Canterbury Tactix
(Australia) Caitlin Thwaites	Melbourne Vixens	Central Pulse
(New Zealand) Victoria Smith	Canterbury Tactix	Central Pulse
(New Zealand) Jade Topia	Southern Steel	Central Pulse
(Australia) Megan Dehn	Southern Steel	Northern Mystics
(New Zealand) Rachel Rasmussen	Central Pulse	Northern Mystics
(Australia) Natasha Chokljat	Melbourne Vixens	Southern Steel
(New Zealand) Paula Griffin	Central Pulse	Southern Steel
(New Zealand) Jamilah Gupwell	Central Pulse	Waikato Bay of Plenty Magic
(New Zealand) Julianna Naoupu	Southern Steel	Waikato Bay of Plenty Magic
(New Zealand) Sulu Tone-Fitzpatrick	Northern Mystics	Waikato Bay of Plenty Magic

Notes

- ^1 In 2009, Bianca Giteau played for West Coast Fever.
- ^2 In 2009, Donna Wilkins played for Southern Steel.

== Head coaches and captains ==
Team	Head coach	Captain
Adelaide Thunderbirds	Jane Woodlands-Thompson	Natalie von Bertouch
Melbourne Vixens	Julie Hoornweg	Sharelle McMahon; Bianca Chatfield
New South Wales Swifts	Julie Fitzgerald	Catherine Cox
Queensland Firebirds	Roselee Jencke	Lauren Nourse
West Coast Fever	Jane Searle	Johannah Curran
Canterbury Tactix	Helen Mahon-Stroud	Maree Bowden; Donna Wilkins
Central Pulse	Yvette McCausland-Durie	Katrina Grant
Northern Mystics	Debbie Fuller	Temepara George
Southern Steel	Robyn Broughton	Wendy Frew; Liana Leota
Waikato Bay of Plenty Magic	Noeline Taurua	Laura Langman

== Pre-season ==
Tournaments

Tournament	Date	Winner	Score	Runners-up	Venue
NSW Swifts Tournament	22–23 January	New South Wales Swifts		^{(Note 3)}	Sydney Olympic Park Sports Centre
Queenstown Pre-Season Tournament	28–30 January	Queensland Firebirds	50–46	Central Pulse	Queenstown Events Centre

Notes

- ^3 Other participants included Melbourne Vixens, Adelaide Thunderbirds, West Coast Fever
- ^4 Other participants in Queenstown included Canterbury Tactix and Southern Steel

Matches

Northern Mystics, New South Wales Swifts and Waikato Bay of Plenty Magic played a series of five-quarter matches.

29 January	Northern Mystics	61–64	New South Wales Swifts	Auckland

30 January	Northern Mystics	61–52	New South Wales Swifts	Auckland

6 February	Waikato Bay of Plenty Magic	62–54	Northern Mystics	Te Awamutu

== Regular season ==
In order to be concluded before the 2011 World Netball Championships, the regular season used a more condensed format. It still featured 65 games, but included several new features including three "double rounds" which featured seven or eight matches, rather than the traditional four or five. The "bye" rounds were dropped and Thursday night matches were introduced for five of the regular rounds.

=== Round 1 ===
13 February	New South Wales Swifts	60 – 40	Adelaide Thunderbirds	Sydney Olympic Park Sports Centre
12:20 (UTC+13)	Catherine Cox 22/29 (76%); Carla Dziwoki 11/11 (100%); Susan Pratley 27/27 (100%)	Stats	Erin Bell 5/8 (63%); Carla Borrego 31/35 (89%); Bianca Giteau 4/6 (67%)

Mon 14 February	Northern Mystics	51 – 34	Southern Steel	Trusts Stadium
19:40 (UTC+11)	Cathrine Latu 30/35 (86%); Maria Tutaia 21/29 (72%)	Report; Stats	Tania Dalton 6/6 (100%); Paula Griffin 16/21 (76%); Te Paea Selby-Rickit 12/20 (60%)

=== Round 2 ===
Sat 19 February	Central Pulse	44 – 54	Northern Mystics	Te Rauparaha Arena
16:20 UTC+13	Te Amo Amaru-Tibble 3/5 (60%); Amber Bellringer 14/20 (70%); Caitlin Thwaites 27/35 (77%)	Stats	Cathrine Latu 36/36 (100%); Bailey Mes 0/2 (0%); Maria Tutaia 18/23 (78%)

Sun 20 February	Adelaide Thunderbirds	47 – 65	Melbourne Vixens	ETSA Park
13:50 (UTC+10:30)	Erin Bell 8/13 (62%); Carla Borrego 35/40 (88%); Bianca Giteau 4/4 (100%)	Stats	Kate Beveridge 39/47 (83%); Sharelle McMahon 26/30 (87%)

Sun 20 February	Waikato Bay of Plenty Magic	51 – 36	Southern Steel	Energy Events Centre
18:20 (UTC+13)	Jamilah Gupwell 3/6 (50%); Julianna Naoupu 12/17 (71%); Irene van Dyk 36/40 (90%)	Stats	Paula Griffin 20/24 (83%); Daneka Wipiiti 16/23 (70%)

Mon 21 February	Canterbury Tactix	48 – 54	West Coast Fever	CBS Canterbury Arena
19:40 (UTC+13)	Ellen Halpenny 22/26 (85%); Donna Wilkins 26/32 (81%)	Stats	Caitlin Bassett 38/41 (93%); Ashlee Howard 7/8 (88%); Leah Shoard 9/9 (100%)

Mon 21 February	Queensland Firebirds	51 – 48	New South Wales Swifts	Brisbane Convention and Exhibition Centre
18:40 (UTC+10)	Romelda Aiken-George 28/37 (76%); Natalie Medhurst 23/26 (88%)	Stats	Catherine Cox 27/34 (79%); Susan Pratley 21/25 (84%)

=== Round 3 ===
Thu 24 February	Northern Mystics	39 – 45	Waikato Bay of Plenty Magic	Trusts Stadium
19:40 (UTC+13)	Cathrine Latu 22/27 (81%); Maria Folau 17/27 (63%)	Stats	Jamilah Gupwell 9/13 (69%); Julianna Naoupu 7/12 (58%); Irene van Dyk 29/33 (88%)

Thu 24 February	West Coast Fever	53 – 72	Adelaide Thunderbirds	Challenge Stadium
19:10 (UTC+8)	Caitlin Bassett 49/53 (92%); Ashlee Howard 1/1 (100%); Leah Shoard 3/6 (50%)	Stats	Erin Bell 16/23 (70%); Carla Borrego 50/53 (94%); Bianca Giteau 6/6 (100%); Cody Lange 0/2 (0%)

Sat 26 February	Central Pulse	43 – 45	Southern Steel	Te Rauparaha Arena
14:20 (UTC+13)	Te Amo Amaru-Tibble 1/3 (33%); Amber Bellringer 13/22 (59%); Caitlin Thwaites 29/36 (81%)	Stats	Paula Griffin 16/21 (76%); Daneka Wipiiti 29/35 (83%)

Sat 26 February	Queensland Firebirds	64 – 41	Adelaide Thunderbirds	Brisbane Convention and Exhibition Centre
13:20 (UTC+10)	Romelda Aiken 50/54 (93%); Natalie Medhurst 13/18 (72%); Chelsea Pitman 1/3 (33%)	Stats	Erin Bell 6/10 (60%); Carla Borrego 30/34 (88%); Bianca Giteau 5/6 (83%)

Sun 27 February	Canterbury Tactix	v	Northern Mystics ^{(Note 5)}
19:30 (UTC+12)

Sun 27 February	New South Wales Swifts	45 – 49	Melbourne Vixens	Sydney Olympic Park Sports Centre
14:20 (UTC+10)	Catherine Cox 11/15 (73%); Carla Dziwoki 14/16 (88%); Susan Pratley 20/26 (77%)	Stats	Kate Beveridge 29/38 (76%); Sharelle McMahon 20/25 (80%)

Mon 28 February	Central Pulse	44 – 46	Waikato Bay of Plenty Magic	TSB Bank Arena
19:40 (UTC+13)	Amber Bellringer 17/27 (63%); Caitlin Thwaites 27/33 (82%)	Stats	Jamilah Gupwell 5/7 (71%); Julianna Naoupu 9/11 (82%); Irene van Dyk 32/36 (89%)

Mon 28 February	West Coast Fever	38 – 62	Queensland Firebirds	Challenge Stadium
19:10 (UTC+8)	Caitlin Bassett 30/35 (86%); Ashlee Howard 3/3 (100%); Leah Shoard 5/11 (45%)	Stats	Romelda Aiken 20/25 (80%); Natalie Medhurst 39/45 (87%); Ameliaranne Wells 3/4 (75%)

=== Round 4 ===
Sat 5 March	Adelaide Thunderbirds	51 – 41	Central Pulse	ETSA Park
13:50 (UTC+10:30)	Erin Bell 14/20 (70%); Carla Borrego 37/44 (84%)	Stats	Amber Bellringer 14/17 (82%); Caitlin Thwaites 27/31 (87%)

Sun 6 March	Queensland Firebirds	51 – 36	Southern Steel	Brisbane Convention and Exhibition Centre
13:20 (UTC+10)	Romelda Aiken 30/36 (83%); Natalie Medhurst 21/24 (88%)	Stats	Paula Griffin 15/22 (68%); Daneka Wipiiti 21/26 (81%)

Sun 6 March	Northern Mystics	56 – 54	Melbourne Vixens	Trusts Stadium
18:20 (UTC+13)	Megan Dehn 5/6 (83%); Cathrine Latu 40/42 (95%); Maria Tutaia 11/16 (69%)	Stats	Kate Beveridge 29/37 (78%); Sharelle McMahon 25/30 (83%)

Mon 7 March	Canterbury Tactix	56 – 63	Waikato Bay of Plenty Magic	Energy Events Centre ^{(Note 6)}
19:40 (UTC+13)	Ellen Halpenny 11/17 (65%); Anna Thompson 15/18 (83%); Donna Wilkins 30/35 (86%)	Q4: 47–47; Stats	Julianna Naoupu 37/40 (93%); Irene van Dyk 26/27 (96%)

Mon 7 March	New South Wales Swifts	55 – 51	West Coast Fever	Sydney Olympic Park Sports Centre
19:40 (UTC+11)	Catherine Cox 22/38 (58%); Susan Pratley 33/40 (83%)	Stats	Caitlin Bassett 43/50 (86%); Leah Shoard 8/12 (67%)

=== Round 5 ===
Sat 12 March	Melbourne Vixens	70 – 39	West Coast Fever	State Netball Hockey Centre
14:20 (UTC+11)	Kate Beveridge 17/23 (74%); Tegan Caldwell 19/21 (90%); Kathleen Knott 5/6 (83%); Sharelle McMahon 29/35 (83%)	Stats	Caitlin Bassett 21/25 (84%); Ashlee Howard 12/15 (80%); Leah Shoard 6/8 (75%)

Sun 13 March	Adelaide Thunderbirds	42 – 64	Queensland Firebirds	ETSA Park
13:50 (UTC+10:30)	Erin Bell 31/34 (91%); Carla Borrego 2/2 (100%); Bianca Giteau 6/11 (55%); Cody Lange 3/5 (60%)	Stats	Romelda Aiken 39/47 (83%); Natalie Medhurst 25/27 (93%)

Sun 13 March	Waikato Bay of Plenty Magic	46 – 47	Northern Mystics	Mystery Creek Events Centre
18:20 (UTC+13)	Julianna Naoupu 20/31 (65%); Irene van Dyk 26/31 (84%)	Stats	Megan Dehn 3/5 (60%); Cathrine Latu 23/26 (88%); Maria Tutaia 21/23 (91%)

Mon 14 March	Southern Steel	50 – 44	Central Pulse	Invercargill ILT Velodrome
19:40 (UTC+13)	Paula Griffin 29/34 (85%); Daneka Wipiiti 21/27 (78%)	Stats	Amber Bellringer 18/24 (75%); Caitlin Thwaites 26/30 (87%)

Mon 14 March	New South Wales Swifts	54 – 45	Canterbury Tactix	Sydney Olympic Park Sports Centre
19:40 (UTC+11)	Catherine Cox 27/37 (73%); Susan Pettitt 17/20 (85%); Amorette Wild 10/12 (83%)	Report; Stats	Ellen Halpenny 21/25 (84%); Donna Wilkins 24/25 (96%)

=== Round 6 ===
Thu 17 March	West Coast Fever	49 – 70	New South Wales Swifts	Challenge Stadium
19:10 (UTC+8)	Caitlin Bassett 30/34 (88%); Leah Shoard 19/24 (79%)	Stats	Catherine Cox 29/35 (83%); Carla Dziwoki 14/15 (93%); Susan Pratley 27/31 (87%)

Sat 19 March	West Coast Fever	50 – 47	Southern Steel	Challenge Stadium
12:50 (UTC+8)	Caitlin Bassett 39/41 (95%); Leah Shoard 11/16 (69%)	Stats	Jodi Brown 9/11 (82%); Paula Griffin 7/9 (78%); Daneka Wipiiti 31/39 (79%)

Sun 20 March	New South Wales Swifts	53 – 57	Queensland Firebirds	Sydney Olympic Park Sports Centre
14:20 (UTC+11)	Catherine Cox 31/36 (86%); Susan Pratley 22/25 (88%)	Stats	Romelda Aiken 37/43 (86%); Natalie Medhurst 20/25 (80%)

Sun 20 March	Central Pulse	46 – 43	Canterbury Tactix	Arena Manawatu
18:20 (UTC+13)	Amber Bellringer 16/23 (70%); Caitlin Thwaites 30/34 (88%)	Stats	Ellen Halpenny 9/14 (64%); Anna Thompson 10/13 (77%); Donna Wilkins 24/28 (86%)

Mon 21 March	Waikato Bay of Plenty Magic	53 – 41	Melbourne Vixens	Mystery Creek Events Centre
19:40 (UTC+13)	Julianna Naoupu 22/27 (81%); Irene van Dyk 31/36 (86%)	Stats	Kate Beveridge 4/5 (80%); Tegan Caldwell 13/20 (65%); Sharelle McMahon 24/27 (89%)

Mon 21 March	Adelaide Thunderbirds	57 – 55	Northern Mystics	ETSA Park
19:10 (UTC+10:30)	Erin Bell 21/24 (88%); Carla Borrego 36/41 (88%)	Stats	Cathrine Latu 29/31 (94%); Maria Tutaia 26/31 (84%)

=== Round 7: Rivalry Round ===
Round 7 featured five Australia verses New Zealand matches. Goals scored by Australian and New Zealand teams were added together and the country with the most goals won the Rivalry Round Trophy. Australia won the 2011 Rivalry Round with an aggregate score of 263–239 over New Zealand.

Sat 26 March	Northern Mystics	52 – 61	Queensland Firebirds	Trusts Stadium
16:20 (UTC+13)	Cathrine Latu 19/19 (100%); Maria Folau 33/38 (87%)	Stats	Romelda Aiken 38/43 (88%); Natalie Medhurst 23/26 (88%)

Sun 27 March	Melbourne Vixens	65 – 50	Canterbury Tactix	Hisense Arena
14:20 (UTC+11)	Kate Beveridge 33/40 (83%); Sharelle McMahon 32/35 (91%)	Stats	Anna Thompson 17/26 (65%); Donna Wilkins 33/38 (87%)

Sun 27 March	Central Pulse	43 – 48	New South Wales Swifts	TSB Bank Arena
18:20 (UTC+13)	Te Amo Amaru-Tibble 2/2 (100%); Amber Bellringer 8/15 (53%); Caitlin Thwaites 33/43 (77%)	Stats	Catherine Cox 23/32 (72%); Susan Pettitt 25/29 (86%)

Mon 28 March	Southern Steel	52 – 48	Adelaide Thunderbirds	Invercargill ILT Velodrome
19:40 (UTC+13)	Paula Griffin 21/23 (91%); Daneka Wipiiti 31/36 (86%)	Stats	Erin Bell 17/18 (94%); Carla Borrego 31/34 (91%)

Mon 28 March	West Coast Fever	41 – 42	Waikato Bay of Plenty Magic	Challenge Stadium
19:10 (UTC+8)	Caitlin Bassett 23/33 (70%); Ashlee Howard 13/16 (81%); Leah Shoard 5/10 (50%)	Stats	Julianna Naoupu 17/23 (74%); Irene van Dyk 25/26 (96%)

=== Round 8 ===
Thu 31 March	Canterbury Tactix	49 – 44	Southern Steel	CBS Canterbury Arena
19:40 (UTC+13)	Anna Thompson 20/23 (87%); Donna Wilkins 29/31 (94%)	Stats	Paula Griffin 33/38 (87%); Daneka Wipiiti 11/14 (79%)	Attendance: 5,124

Thu 31 March	Melbourne Vixens	42 – 52	Queensland Firebirds	State Netball Hockey Centre
19:40 (UTC+11)	Kate Beveridge 15/26 (58%); Kathleen Knott 16/19 (84%); Sharelle McMahon 11/14 (79%)	Stats	Romelda Aiken 31/38 (82%); Natalie Medhurst 21/27 (78%)

Sat 2 April	Northern Mystics	61 – 48	Central Pulse	Trusts Stadium
16:20 (UTC+13)	Megan Dehn 7/8 (88%); Cathrine Latu 42/42 (100%); Maria Folau 12/14 (86%)	Stats	Te Amo Amaru-Tibble 4/6 (67%); Amber Bellringer 9/18 (50%); Alanah Cassidy 1/1 (100%); Caitlin Thwaites 34/42 (81%)

Sun 3 April	Melbourne Vixens	42 – 33	Southern Steel	Hisense Arena
14:20 (UTC+10)	Kate Beveridge 23/26 (88%); Tegan Philip 19/20 (95%)	Stats	Paula Griffin 17/28 (61%); Daneka Wipiiti 16/22 (73%)

Sun 3 April	Canterbury Tactix	56 – 59	Adelaide Thunderbirds	CBS Canterbury Arena
18:20 (UTC+12)	Anna Thompson 24/33 (73%); Donna Wilkins 32/35 (91%)	Stats	Erin Bell 15/18 (83%); Carla Borrego 44/48 (92%)

Mon 4 April	Central Pulse	63 – 61	West Coast Fever	Te Rauparaha Arena
19:40 (UTC+12)	Amber Bellringer 16/20 (80%); Caitlin Thwaites 47/60 (78%)	Q4: 48–48; Stats	Caitlin Bassett 47/52 (90%); Ashlee Howard 12/17 (71%); Leah Shoard 2/3 (67%)

Mon 4 April	Queensland Firebirds	53 – 49	Waikato Bay of Plenty Magic	Brisbane Convention and Exhibition Centre
19:40 (UTC+10)	Romelda Aiken 36/39 (92%); Natalie Medhurst 17/21 (81%)	Stats	Julianna Naoupu 24/29 (83%); Irene van Dyk 25/26 (96%)

=== Round 9 ===
Thu 7 April	Canterbury Tactix	45 – 58	Northern Mystics ^{(Note 5)}	Vector Arena
19:30 (UTC+12)	Ellen Halpenny 2/4 (50%); Anna Thompson 11/17 (65%); Donna Wilkins 32/35 (91%)	Stats	Cathrine Latu 29/32 (91%); Bailey Mes 6/8 (75%); Maria Tutaia 23/30 (77%)

Sat 9 April	Southern Steel	49 – 40	Canterbury Tactix	Edgar Centre
16:20 (UTC+12)	Paula Griffin 34/39 (87%); Daneka Wipiiti 15/22 (68%)	Stats	Anna Thompson 17/20 (85%); Wilkins 23/26 (88%)

Sun 10 April	Melbourne Vixens	55 – 53	Adelaide Thunderbirds	Hisense Arena
14:20 (UTC+10)	Kate Beveridge 22/27 (81%); Tegan Caldwell 33/36 (92%)	Stats	Carla Borrego 37/40 (93%); Erin Bell 15/19 (79%); Cody Lange 1/1 (100%)

Sun 10 April	Central Pulse	44 – 61	Queensland Firebirds	Te Rauparaha Arena
18:20 (UTC+12)	Caitlin Thwaites 35/44 (80%); Alanah Cassidy 3/6 (50%); Amber Bellringer 6/11 (55%)	Stats	Romelda Aiken 37/44 (84%); Natalie Medhurst 24/29 (83%)

Mon 11 April	Waikato Bay of Plenty Magic	46 – 53	New South Wales Swifts	Queen Elizabeth Youth Centre
19:40 (UTC+12)	Irene van Dyk 28/30 (93%); Jamilah Gupwell 10/13 (77%); Julianna Naoupu 8/8 (100%)	Stats	Catherine Cox 31/36 (86%); Amorette Wild 3/4 (75%); Susan Pratley 19/26 (73%)

Mon 11 April	West Coast Fever	54 – 56	Northern Mystics	Challenge Stadium
17:40 (UTC+8)	Caitlin Bassett 41/44 (93%); Leah Shoard 13/17 (76%)	Stats	Cathrine Latu 30/35 (86%); Maria Tutaia 26/35 (74%)

=== Round 10 ===
Thu 14 April	Waikato Bay of Plenty Magic	53 – 49	Canterbury Tactix	Energy Events Centre
19:40 (UTC+12)	Jamilah Gupwell 4/5 (80%); Julianna Naoupu 14/19 (74%); Irene van Dyk 35/36 (97%)	Stats	Anna Thompson 19/24 (79%); Donna Wilkins 30/30 (100%)

Thu 14 April	Queensland Firebirds	57 – 36	Melbourne Vixens	Brisbane Convention and Exhibition Centre
19:40 (UTC+10)	Romelda Aiken 35/42 (83%); Natalie Medhurst 22/30 (73%); Ameliaranne Wells 0/2 (0%)	Stats	Kate Beveridge 24/32 (75%); Tegan Phillip 11/17 (65%); Chelsey Tregear 1/2 (50%)

Sat 16 April	Adelaide Thunderbirds	57 – 53	New South Wales Swifts	ETSA Park
13:50 (UTC+9:30)	Erin Bell 19/23 (83%); Carla Borrego 38/40 (95%)	Stats	Catherine Cox 34/40 (85%); Carla Dziwoki 3/3 (100%); Susan Pratley 16/24 (67%)

Sun 17 April	West Coast Fever	38 – 54	Melbourne Vixens	Challenge Stadium
12:20 (UTC+8)	Caitlin Bassett 30/36 (83%); Ashlee Howard 7/12 (58%); Leah Shoard 1/5 (20%)	Stats	Tegan Phillip 37/50 (74%); Kate Beveridge 17/24 (71%)

Sun 17 April	Southern Steel	33 – 38	Waikato Bay of Plenty Magic	Invercargill ILT Velodrome
18:20 (UTC+12)	Paula Griffin 24/26 (92%); Daneka Wipiiti 9/14 (64%)	Stats	Jamilah Gupwell 3/7 (43%); Julianna Naoupu 6/11 (55%); Irene van Dyk 29/30 (97%)

Mon 18 April	Canterbury Tactix	45 – 47	Central Pulse	CBS Canterbury Arena
19:40 (UTC+12)	Anna Thompson 24/28 (86%); Donna Wilkins 21/24 (88%)	Stats	Alanah Cassidy 8/13 (62%); Caitlin Thwaites 39/47 (83%)

Mon 18 April	New South Wales Swifts	53 – 46	Northern Mystics	Sydney Olympic Park Sports Centre
19:40 (UTC+10)	Catherine Cox 37/48 (77%); Susan Pratley 16/23 (70%)	Stats	Megan Dehn 2/2 (100%); Cathrine Latu 17/17 (100%); Bailey Mes 1/4 (25%); Maria Folau 26/29 (90%)

=== Round 11 ===
Thu 21 April	Southern Steel	39 – 40	New South Wales Swifts	Edgar Centre
19:40 (UTC+12)	Paula Griffin 16/23 (70%); Daneka Wipiiti 23/35 (66%)	Stats	Catherine Cox 25/33 (76%); Susan Pratley 15/19 (79%)

Sat 23 April	Melbourne Vixens	58 – 42	Central Pulse	Hisense Arena
14:20 (UTC+10)	Kathleen Knott 10/11 (91%); Kate Beveridge 25/30 (83%); Tegan Caldwell 23/26 (88%)	Stats	Caitlin Thwaites 37/50 (74%); Alanah Cassidy 4/5 (80%); Amber Bellringer 1/2 (50%)

Sun 24 April	Adelaide Thunderbirds	36 – 55	Waikato Bay of Plenty Magic	ETSA Park
13:20 (UTC+9:30)	Erin Bell 22/26 (85%); Bianca Giteau 8/12 (67%); Carla Borrego 6/10 (60%)	Stats	Irene van Dyk 43/47 (91%); Jamilah Gupwell 0/1 (0%); Julianna Naoupu 12/17 (71%)

Sun 24 April	Northern Mystics	62 – 43	Canterbury Tactix	Trusts Stadium
18:20 (UTC+12)	Cathrine Latu 45/48 (94%); Maria Tutaia 17/23 (74%)	Stats	Ellen Halpenny 2/3 (67%); Anna Thompson 22/28 (79%); Donna Wilkins 19/22 (86%)

Mon 25 April	Queensland Firebirds	56 – 54	West Coast Fever	Brisbane Convention and Exhibition Centre
19:40 (UTC+10)	Romelda Aiken 26/31 (84%); Natalie Medhurst 30/36 (83%)	Stats	Caitlin Bassett 37/39 (95%); Ashlee Howard 4/4 (100%); Leah Shoard 13/17 (76%)

=== Round 12 ===
Sat 30 April	Canterbury Tactix	52 – 69	Queensland Firebirds	CBS Canterbury Arena
16:20 (UTC+12)	Ellen Halpenny 26/35 (74%); Donna Wilkins 26/35 (74%)	Stats	Romelda Aiken 50/55 (91%); Natalie Medhurst 19/21 (90%)

Sun 1 May	Melbourne Vixens	33 – 45	New South Wales Swifts	Hisense Arena
14:20 (UTC+10)	Kate Beveridge 8/14 (57%); Tegan Caldwell 16/21 (76%); Kathleen Knott 9/14 (64%)	Stats	Catherine Cox 33/42 (79%); Susan Pratley 12/15 (80%)

Sun 1 May	Southern Steel	35 – 47	Northern Mystics	Invercargill ILT Velodrome
18:20 (UTC+12)	Paula Griffin 22/30 (73%); Te Paea Selby-Rickit 4/6 (67%); Daneka Wipiiti 9/19 (47%)	Stats	Cathrine Latu 27/27 (100%); Maria Tutaia 20/32 (63%)

Mon 2 May	Waikato Bay of Plenty Magic	60 – 50	Central Pulse	Taupo Events Centre
19:40 (UTC+12)	Jamilah Gupwell 0/1 (0%); Julianna Naoupu 22/25 (88%); Irene van Dyk 37/39 (95%); Arahi Wall 1/2 (50%)	Stats	Amber Bellringer 9/12 (75%); Alanah Cassidy 1/4 (25%); Brooke Leaver 0/1 (0%); Caitlin Thwaites 40/46 (87%)

Mon 2 May	Adelaide Thunderbirds	59 – 64	West Coast Fever	ETSA Park
19:10 (UTC+9:30)	Carla Borrego 32/38 (84%); Erin Bell 27/34 (79%)	Stats	Caitlin Bassett 50/54 (93%); Ashlee Howard 2/3 (67%); Leah Shoard 12/17 (71%)

Notes

- ^5 The Round 3 match between Canterbury Tactix and Northern Mystics was due to be played on 27 February. However it was postponed due to the 2011 Christchurch earthquake. The match was rescheduled for 7 April.
- ^6 The Round 4 match between Canterbury Tactix and Waikato Bay of Plenty Magic was originally scheduled to be played in Christchurch. However following the earthquake, the match was moved to Rotorua. It was still regarded as a "home" match for Tactix.

=== Final table ===
2011 ANZ Championship ladder
Pos	Team	Pld	W	L	GF	GA	GD	G%	Pts
1	Queensland Firebirds	13	13	0	758	587	171	129.13	26
2	Waikato Bay of Plenty Magic	13	10	3	647	578	69	111.94	20
3	New South Wales Swifts	13	9	4	677	606	71	111.72	18
4	Northern Mystics	13	9	4	684	619	65	110.5	18
5	Melbourne Vixens	13	8	5	664	610	54	108.85	16
6	Adelaide Thunderbirds	13	5	8	662	737	-75	89.82	10
7	Southern Steel	13	4	9	533	594	-61	89.73	8
8	Central Pulse	13	3	10	599	683	-84	87.7	6
9	West Coast Fever	13	3	10	646	754	-108	85.68	6
10	Canterbury Tactix	13	1	12	621	723	-102	85.89	2
Updated 8 March 2021

Qualified for Major semi-final
Qualified for Minor semi-final

- Pld = Games played
- W = Win (2 points)
- L = Loss (0 points)
- GF = Goals For
- GA = Goals Against
- GD = Goals Difference (= GF−GA)
- G% = Goal percentage (= 100 × GF/GA)

Pts = Points

== Playoffs ==
Semifinals
9 May – Gold Coast
Queensland Firebirds	50
Waikato Bay of Plenty Magic	39
8 May – Sydney
New South Wales Swifts	44
Northern Mystics	49

Preliminary final
15 May – Hamilton
Waikato Bay of Plenty Magic	42
Northern Mystics	43

Grand final
22 May – Brisbane
Queensland Firebirds	57
Northern Mystics	44

=== Minor semifinal ===
Sunday 8 May; 14:20 (UTC+10)	New South Wales Swifts	44–49	Northern Mystics	Sydney Olympic Park Sports Centre; Umpires: Rachael Ayre (Australia); Mandy Nottingham (New Zealand); Reserve umpire: Jemma Carlton (Australia)	TEN; SKYSport
Sunday 8 May; 14:20 (UTC+10)	Scoring by quarter: 11-15, 9-13, 11–10, 13-11			Sydney Olympic Park Sports Centre; Umpires: Rachael Ayre (Australia); Mandy Nottingham (New Zealand); Reserve umpire: Jemma Carlton (Australia)	TEN; SKYSport
Sunday 8 May; 14:20 (UTC+10)	Catherine Cox 28/36 (78%); Amorette Wild 8/8 (100%); Susan Pratley 8/10 (80%)		Cathrine Latu 25/28 (89%); Maria Tutaia 24/29 (83%)	Sydney Olympic Park Sports Centre; Umpires: Rachael Ayre (Australia); Mandy Nottingham (New Zealand); Reserve umpire: Jemma Carlton (Australia)	TEN; SKYSport

=== Major semifinal ===
Monday 9 May; 19:40 (UTC+10)	Stats	Queensland Firebirds	50–39	Waikato Bay of Plenty Magic	Gold Coast Convention and Exhibition Centre	TEN; SKYSport
Monday 9 May; 19:40 (UTC+10)	Stats	Scoring by quarter: 12–8, 11-8, 16–10, 11-13			Gold Coast Convention and Exhibition Centre	TEN; SKYSport
Monday 9 May; 19:40 (UTC+10)	Stats	Romelda Aiken 29/33 (88%); Natalie Medhurst 21/27 (78%)		Irene van Dyk 17/19 (89%); Jamilah Gupwell 16/18 (89%); Julianna Naoupu 6/8 (75%)	Gold Coast Convention and Exhibition Centre	TEN; SKYSport

=== Preliminary final ===
Sunday 15 May; 18:20 (UTC+12)	Stats	Waikato Bay of Plenty Magic	42–43	Northern Mystics	Mystery Creek Events Centre	TEN; SKYSport
Sunday 15 May; 18:20 (UTC+12)	Stats	Scoring by quarter: 13–9, 7-16, 12–10, 10-8			Mystery Creek Events Centre	TEN; SKYSport
Sunday 15 May; 18:20 (UTC+12)	Stats	Irene van Dyk 27/28 (96%); Julianna Naoupu 14/19 (74%); Jamilah Gupwell 1/3 (33%)		Cathrine Latu 15/17 (88%); Maria Tutaia 28/30 (93%)	Mystery Creek Events Centre	TEN; SKYSport

=== Grand final ===
Sunday 22 May; 14:30 (UTC+10)	Stats	Queensland Firebirds	57–44	Northern Mystics	Brisbane Convention & Exhibition Centre; Attendance: 3,541; Umpires: Sharon Kelly (Australia); Mandy Nottingham (New Zealand); Reserve umpire: Rachael Ayre (Australia)	TEN; SKYSport
Sunday 22 May; 14:30 (UTC+10)	Stats	Scoring by quarter: 12–12, 14–12, 18–8, 13-12			Brisbane Convention & Exhibition Centre; Attendance: 3,541; Umpires: Sharon Kelly (Australia); Mandy Nottingham (New Zealand); Reserve umpire: Rachael Ayre (Australia)	TEN; SKYSport
Sunday 22 May; 14:30 (UTC+10)	Stats	Romelda Aiken 35/40 (88%); Natalie Medhurst 22/24 (92%)		Cathrine Latu 21/21 (100%); Maria Tutaia 23/31 (74%)	Brisbane Convention & Exhibition Centre; Attendance: 3,541; Umpires: Sharon Kelly (Australia); Mandy Nottingham (New Zealand); Reserve umpire: Rachael Ayre (Australia)	TEN; SKYSport

== Season statistics ==
Top 5 Goals scored
Pos.	Player	Team	GS	GA	G%
1	Romelda Aiken	Queensland Firebirds	523	607	86.2
2	Caitlin Bassett	West Coast Fever	478	538	88.8
3	Cathrine Latu	Northern Mystics	449	482	93.2
4	Irene van Dyk	Waikato Bay of Plenty Magic	446	485	92.0
5	Caitlin Thwaites	Central Pulse	431	530	81.3

Top 5 Goal assists
Pos.	Player	Team	G/A
1	Kimberlee Green	New South Wales Swifts	197
2	Temepara George	Northern Mystics	195
3	Madison Browne	Melbourne Vixens	179
4	Laura Langman	Waikato Bay of Plenty Magic	148
5	Natalie Medhurst	Queensland Firebirds	141

Top 5 Rebounds
Pos.	Player	Team	Reb.
1	Romelda Aiken	Queensland Firebirds	63
2	Cathrine Latu	Northern Mystics	42
3	Laura Geitz	Queensland Firebirds	41
4	Casey Williams	Waikato Bay of Plenty Magic	40
5	Irene van Dyk	Waikato Bay of Plenty Magic	37

Top 5 Centre-pass receives
Pos.	Player	Team	CPR
1	Leah Shoard	West Coast Fever	263
2	Natalie Medhurst	Queensland Firebirds	256
3	Chelsea Pitman	Queensland Firebirds	250
4	Maria Tutaia	Northern Mystics	228
5	Emily Beaton	Adelaide Thunderbirds	214

Top 5 Intercepts
Pos.	Player	Team	Int.
1	Laura Geitz	Queensland Firebirds	57
2=	Casey Williams	Waikato Bay of Plenty Magic	33
2=	Anna Scarlett	Northern Mystics	33
4=	Leana de Bruin	Southern Steel	30
4=	Sonia Mkoloma	New South Wales Swifts	30

Top 5 Deflections
Pos.	Player	Team	Defl.
1	Laura Geitz	Queensland Firebirds	92
2	Anna Scarlett	Northern Mystics	91
3	Leana de Bruin	Southern Steel	85
4	Casey Williams	Waikato Bay of Plenty Magic	70
5=	Bianca Chatfield	Melbourne Vixens	53
5=	Katrina Grant	Central Pulse	53

Top 5 Penalties
Pos.	Player	Team	Pen.
1	Laura Geitz	Queensland Firebirds	264
2	Anna Scarlett	Northern Mystics	245
3	Susan Fuhrmann	West Coast Fever	231
4	Casey Williams	Waikato Bay of Plenty Magic	222
5	Bianca Chatfield	Melbourne Vixens	202

Top 5 Turnovers
Pos.	Player	Team	Turn.
1	Cathrine Latu	Northern Mystics	81
2	Temepara George	Northern Mystics	68
3	Romelda Aiken	Queensland Firebirds	59
4	Erin Bell	Adelaide Thunderbirds	50
5	Maree Bowden	Canterbury Tactix	49

== Award winners ==
=== ANZ Championship Most Valuable Player ===
Winner	Team	Points
(New Zealand) Leana de Bruin	Southern Steel	18
(Australia) Natalie Medhurst	Queensland Firebirds	18
(Jamaica) Romelda Aiken	Queensland Firebirds	16
(Australia) Caitlin Bassett	West Coast Fever	16
(Australia) Natalie von Bertouch	Adelaide Thunderbirds	16

=== Best Young Player ===
Winner	Team	Votes
(New Zealand) Kayla Cullen	Northern Mystics	20
(Australia) Chelsea Pitman	Queensland Firebirds	15
(New Zealand) Sulu Tone-Fitzpatrick	Waikato Bay of Plenty Magic	12
(Australia) Ashleigh Brazill	New South Wales Swifts	
(Australia) Kate Shimmin	Adelaide Thunderbirds	

=== All Star Team ===
Position	Player	Team
GS	(Jamaica) Romelda Aiken	Queensland Firebirds
GA	(Australia) Sharelle McMahon	Melbourne Vixens
WA	(Australia) Emily Beaton	Adelaide Thunderbirds
C	(Australia) Natalie von Bertouch	Adelaide Thunderbirds
WD	(New Zealand) Kayla Cullen	Northern Mystics
GD	(New Zealand) Anna Scarlett	Northern Mystics
GK	(New Zealand) Leana de Bruin	Southern Steel
Coach	(Australia) Roselee Jencke	Queensland Firebirds

=== Australian Netball Awards ===
Award	Winner	Team
Australian ANZ Championship Player of the Year	(Australia) Laura Geitz	Queensland Firebirds
Liz Ellis Diamond	(Australia) Laura Geitz	Queensland Firebirds
Australian ANZ Championship Coach of the Year	(Australia) Roselee Jencke	Queensland Firebirds

== Gallery ==
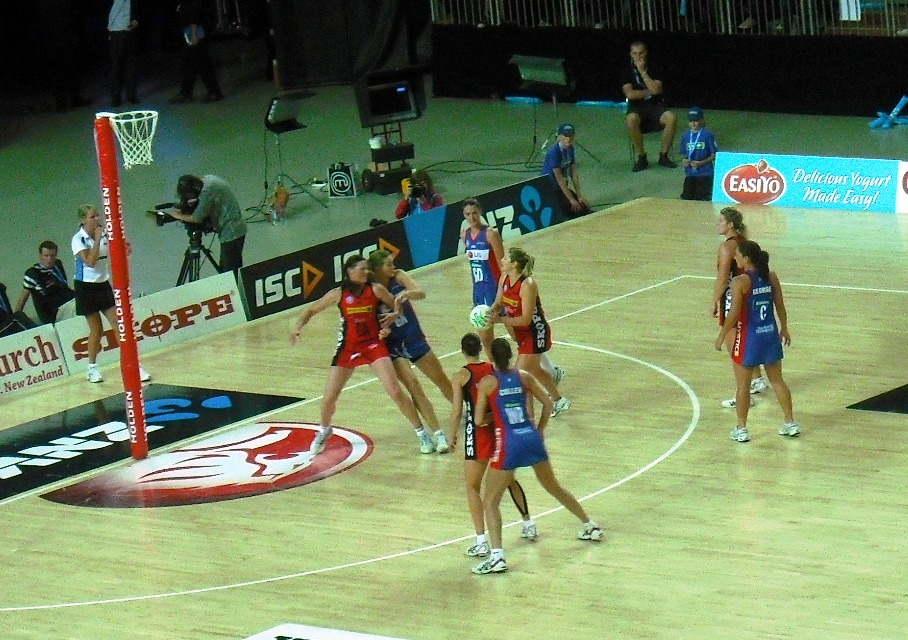
7 April 2011, Vector Arena: Canterbury Tactix 45–58 Northern Mystics.
