= 2011 West Coast Fever season =

West Coast Fever
- 2011 season
- Head coach: Jane Searle
- Captain: Johannah Curran
- Main venue: Challenge Stadium

Season results
- Wins–losses: 3–10
- Season placing: 9th
- Team colours

West Coast Fever seasons
- ← 2010 2012 →

The 2011 West Coast Fever season was the fourth season that the West Coast Fever contested the ANZ Championship, and the fifteenth year of the franchise's competitive history. In 2011, the Fever were coached by Jane Searle, in her third year as head coach. The 2011 season saw little change in the team's struggling history in the ANZ Championship, finishing in ninth place.

== Players ==
=== 2011 team ===
2011 West Coast Fever roster
Players
Coaching staff

Nat.	Name	Position(s)	DoB	Height
(England)	Ama Agbeze	WD, GD, GK	12 November 1982	1.83 m (6 ft 0 in)
(Australia)	Caitlin Bassett	GS	23 May 1988	1.92 m (6 ft 4 in)
(Australia)	Shae Bolton	C, WA, WD	28 June 1989	1.81 m (5 ft 11 in)
(Australia)	Courtney Bruce	GD, GK	8 December 1993	1.89 m (6 ft 2 in)
(Australia)	Johannah Curran (c)	GD, WD	9 December 1986	1.83 m (6 ft 0 in)
(Australia)	Sarah Ebbot	WA	24 March 1988	1.78 m (5 ft 10 in)
(Australia)	Susan Fuhrmann	GK	30 July 1986	1.96 m (6 ft 5 in)
(Australia)	Andrea Gilmore	WD, GD	27 October 1988	1.82 m (6 ft 0 in)
(Australia)	Chanel Gomes (TRP)			–
(Australia)	Ashlee Howard	GA, GS	2 March 1988	1.77 m (5 ft 10 in)
(Australia)	Alicia Janz	WD, C	25 May 1990	1.75 m (5 ft 9 in)
(Australia)	Josie Janz	GD, WD, GK	24 February 1988	1.85 m (6 ft 1 in)
(Australia)	Lindal Rohde (TRP)			–
(Australia)	Leah Shoard	GA, WA	23 May 1986	1.74 m (5 ft 9 in)

Head coach

- (Australia) Jane Searle

Assistant coach

- (Australia) Sue Kenny

Manager: Genevieve Hunter
Physiotherapist: Pippa Flanagan

Notes

- (c) – Captain
- (cc) – Co-captain
- (vc) – Vice-captain
- – Injury / maternity leave
- (TRP) – Temporary Replacement Player

=== Transfers ===
2011 Fever player movements
Gains	Positions	Former team
Ama Agbeze	WD, GD, GK	Central Pulse
Courtney Bruce	GD, GK	New signing
Ashlee Howard	GA, GS	Melbourne Vixens (2009)
Alicia Janz	WD, C	New signing
Losses	Positions	New team
Emma Beckett	GD, WD	Injury retirement
Madison Browne	WA, C	Melbourne Vixens
Janelle Lawson	GS, GA	Not signed
Ashleigh Neal	GA	Not signed

== Regular season ==
=== Fixtures and results ===
Notes

- Colours: Fever win Fever loss Not played/scheduled
- Home teams are listed left, away teams right. Times listed are local.

Round 1	NO MATCH

21 February	Report; Stats	Canterbury Tactix	48 – 54	West Coast Fever	CBS Canterbury Arena, Christchurch
21 February	Report; Stats	Halpenny 22/26 (85%); Wilkins 26/32 (81%)		Bassett 38/41 (93%); Howard 7/8 (88%); Shoard 9/9 (100%)	CBS Canterbury Arena, Christchurch

24 February	Report; Stats	West Coast Fever	53 – 72	Adelaide Thunderbirds	Challenge Stadium, Perth
24 February	Report; Stats	Bassett 49/53 (92%); Howard 1/1 (100%); Shoard 3/6 (50%)		Bell 16/23 (70%); Borrego 50/53 (94%); Giteau 6/6 (100%); Lange 0/2 (0%)	Challenge Stadium, Perth

28 February	Report; Stats	West Coast Fever	38 – 62	Queensland Firebirds	Challenge Stadium, Perth
28 February	Report; Stats	Bassett 30/35 (86%); Howard 3/3 (100%); Shoard 5/11 (45%)		Aiken 20/25 (80%); Medhurst 39/45 (87%); Wells 3/4 (75%)	Challenge Stadium, Perth

7 March	Report; Stats	New South Wales Swifts	55 – 51	West Coast Fever	State Sports Centre, Sydney
7 March	Report; Stats	Cox 22/38 (58%); Pratley 33/40 (83%)		Bassett 43/50 (86%); Shoard 8/12 (67%)	State Sports Centre, Sydney

12 March	Report; Stats	Melbourne Vixens	70 – 39	West Coast Fever	State Netball and Hockey Centre, Melbourne
12 March	Report; Stats	Beveridge 17/23 (74%); Caldwell 19/21 (90%); Knott 5/6 (83%); McMahon 29/35 (83%)		Bassett 21/25 (84%); Howard 12/15 (80%); Shoard 6/8 (75%)	State Netball and Hockey Centre, Melbourne

17 March	Report; Stats	West Coast Fever	49 – 70	New South Wales Swifts	Challenge Stadium, Perth
17 March	Report; Stats	Bassett 30/34 (88%); Shoard 19/24 (79%)		Cox 29/35 (83%); Dziwoki 14/15 (93%); Pratley 27/31 (87%)	Challenge Stadium, Perth

19 March	Report; Stats	West Coast Fever	50 – 47	Southern Steel	Challenge Stadium, Perth
19 March	Report; Stats	Bassett 39/41 (95%); Shoard 11/16 (69%)		Brown 9/11 (82%); Griffin 7/9 (78%); Wipiiti 31/39 (79%)	Challenge Stadium, Perth

28 March	Report; Stats	West Coast Fever	41 – 42	Waikato Bay of Plenty Magic	Challenge Stadium, Perth
28 March	Report; Stats	Bassett 23/33 (70%); Howard 13/16 (81%); Shoard 5/10 (50%)		Naoupu 17/23 (74%) van Dyk 25/26 (96%)	Challenge Stadium, Perth

4 April	Report; Stats	Central Pulse	63 – 61	West Coast Fever	Te Rauparaha Arena, Porirua
4 April	Report; Stats	Bellringer 16/20 (80%); Thwaites 47/60 (78%)		Bassett 47/52 (90%); Howard 12/17 (71%); Shoard 2/3 (67%)	Te Rauparaha Arena, Porirua

11 April	Report; Stats	West Coast Fever	54 – 56	Northern Mystics	Challenge Stadium, Perth
11 April	Report; Stats	Bassett 41/44 (93%); Shoard 13/17 (76%)		Latu 30/35 (86%); Tutaia 26/35 (74%)	Challenge Stadium, Perth

17 April	Report; Stats	West Coast Fever	38 – 54	Melbourne Vixens	Challenge Stadium, Perth
17 April	Report; Stats	Bassett 30/36 (83%); Howard 7/12 (58%); Shoard 1/5 (20%)		Caldwell 37/50 (74%); Beveridge 17/24 (71%)	Challenge Stadium, Perth

25 April	Report; Stats	Queensland Firebirds	56 – 54	West Coast Fever	Brisbane Convention and Exhibition Centre
25 April	Report; Stats	Aiken 26/31 (84%); Medhurst 30/36 (83%)		Bassett 37/39 (95%); Howard 4/4 (100%); Shoard 13/17 (76%)	Brisbane Convention and Exhibition Centre

2 May	Report; Stats	Adelaide Thunderbirds	59 – 64	West Coast Fever	ETSA Park, Adelaide
2 May	Report; Stats	Borrego 32/38 (84%); Bell 27/34 (79%)		Bassett 50/54 (93%); Howard 2/3 (67%); Shoard 12/17 (71%)	ETSA Park, Adelaide

=== Standings ===
2011 ANZ Championship ladder
Pos	Team	Pld	W	L	GF	GA	GD	G%	Pts
1	Queensland Firebirds	13	13	0	758	587	171	129.13	26
2	Waikato Bay of Plenty Magic	13	10	3	647	578	69	111.94	20
3	New South Wales Swifts	13	9	4	677	606	71	111.72	18
4	Northern Mystics	13	9	4	684	619	65	110.5	18
5	Melbourne Vixens	13	8	5	664	610	54	108.85	16
6	Adelaide Thunderbirds	13	5	8	662	737	-75	89.82	10
7	Southern Steel	13	4	9	533	594	-61	89.73	8
8	Central Pulse	13	3	10	599	683	-84	87.7	6
9	West Coast Fever	13	3	10	646	754	-108	85.68	6
10	Canterbury Tactix	13	1	12	621	723	-102	85.89	2
Updated 8 March 2021

Qualified for Major semi-final
Qualified for Minor semi-final

- Pld = Games played
- W = Win (2 points)
- L = Loss (0 points)
- GF = Goals For
- GA = Goals Against
- GD = Goals Difference (= GF−GA)
- G% = Goal percentage (= 100 × GF/GA)

Pts = Points

=== Final placing ===
- 9th (3 wins, 10 losses)

== Statistics ==
- As of Monday 2 May.

Player	GS	GA	G%	A	R	CPR	I	D	P	T
Ama Agbeze	0	0	0	1	19	40	14	46	121	17
Caitlin Bassett	478	538	88.8	17	26	0	0	10	38	41
Shae Bolton	0	0	0	123	0	27	5	28	129	36
Courtney Bruce	0	0	0	0	0	0	0	0	0	0
Johannah Curran	0	0	0	2	3	6	2	7	48	6
Sarah Ebbott	0	0	0	103	0	135	2	9	54	40
Susan Fuhrmann	0	0	0	0	35	0	2	50	231	6
Andrea Gilmore	0	0	0	1	0	80	25	51	110	24
Chanel Gomes	0	0	0	0	2	3	0	5	34	0
Ashlee Howard	61	79	77.2	34	0	52	1	3	9	14
Alicia Janz	0	0	0	2	0	2	0	1	3	3
Josie Janz	0	0	0	0	2	5	5	5	33	1
Lindal Rohde	0	0	0	5	0	8	0	0	1	1
Leah Shoard	107	154	69.5	112	2	263	2	4	29	39

Statistics key
GS	Goals scored	A	Assists	I	Intercepts
GA	Goal attempts	R	Rebounds	D	Deflections
G%	Goal percentage	CPR	Centre pass receives	P	Penalties
= Competition leader				T	Turnovers conceded

== See also ==
- 2011 ANZ Championship season
