= 2009 ANZ Championship season =

Netball league season

- League: ANZ Championship
- Sport: Netball
- Duration: 4 April 2009 – 26 July 2009
- Teams: 10
- TV partner(s): One HD; Network 10; Sky Sport (New Zealand); TVNZ
- Champions: Melbourne Vixens
- Runners-up: Adelaide Thunderbirds
- Minor premiers: Melbourne Vixens
- Season MVP: Romelda Aiken (Firebirds)

ANZ Championship seasons
- ← 2008 2010 →

The 2009 ANZ Championship season was the second season of the ANZ Championship. The 2009 season began on 4 April and concluded on 26 July. Melbourne Vixens were minor premiers. With a team co-captained by Bianca Chatfield and Sharelle McMahon, Vixens subsequently defeated Waikato Bay of Plenty Magic 58–43 in the major semi-final and Adelaide Thunderbirds 54–46 in the grand final to finish as overall premiers. The grand final was played on Sunday 26 July at Hisense Arena.

== Transfers ==
Player	2008 team	2009 team
(Australia) Jane Altschwager	Retirement	Adelaide Thunderbirds
(Australia) Laura von Bertouch	Retirement	Adelaide Thunderbirds
(Australia) Joanna Sutton	Retirement	Adelaide Thunderbirds
(England) Ama Agbeze	West Coast Fever	Melbourne Vixens
(Australia) Kathleen Knott	Victorian Fury	Melbourne Vixens
(Australia) Chelsey Nash	Victorian Fury	Melbourne Vixens
(Australia) Brooke Thompson	Victorian Fury	Melbourne Vixens
(Australia) Sarah Wall		Melbourne Vixens
(Australia) Ashlee Mann	NNSW Blues/NSW Waratahs	New South Wales Swifts
(Australia) Jessica Mansell		New South Wales Swifts
(Australia) Samantha May	Australian Institute of Sport	New South Wales Swifts
(New Zealand) Courtney Tairi	Australian Institute of Sport	New South Wales Swifts
(Australia) Amy Wild		New South Wales Swifts
(Australia) Madison Browne	Melbourne Vixens	West Coast Fever
(Australia) Shae Bolton		West Coast Fever
(Australia) Johannah Curran	Melbourne Vixens	West Coast Fever
(England) Sonia Mkoloma	Central Pulse	Canterbury Tactix
(New Zealand) Larrissa Willcox	West Coast Fever	Canterbury Tactix
(Jamaica) Althea Byfield		Central Pulse
(New Zealand) Paula Griffin	Northern Mystics	Central Pulse
(England) Pamela Cookey	Team Bath	Northern Mystics
(New Zealand) Debbie White	Southern Steel	Northern Mystics
(New Zealand) Donna Wilkins	Retirement	Southern Steel
(New Zealand) Adine Wilson	Retirement	Southern Steel
(New Zealand) Sheryl Scanlan	Northern Mystics	Southern Steel
(Australia) Leah Shoard	New South Wales Swifts	Southern Steel
(New Zealand) Leana de Bruin	Northern Mystics	Waikato Bay of Plenty Magic
(Samoa) Frances Solia	Central Pulse	Waikato Bay of Plenty Magic
(New Zealand) Jessica Tuki	Southern Steel	Waikato Bay of Plenty Magic

== Head coaches and captains ==
Team	Head coach	Captain
Adelaide Thunderbirds	Jane Woodlands-Thompson	Natalie von Bertouch
Melbourne Vixens	Julie Hoornweg	Sharelle McMahon; Bianca Chatfield
New South Wales Swifts	Julie Fitzgerald	Catherine Cox
Queensland Firebirds	Vicki Wilson	Peta Stephens
West Coast Fever	Jane Searle	Stacey Rosman; Johannah Curran
Canterbury Tactix	Helen Mahon-Stroud	Julie Seymour
Central Pulse	Yvette McCausland-Durie	Cushla Lichtwark
Northern Mystics	Te Aroha Keenan	Temepara George
Southern Steel	Robyn Broughton	Adine Wilson
Waikato Bay of Plenty Magic	Noeline Taurua	Joline Henry; Irene van Dyk

== Pre-season tournaments ==
Tournament	Date	Winner	Score	Runners-up	Venue
Queenstown Pre-Season Tournament	20–22 February	Northern Mystics	58–53	New South Wales Swifts	Queenstown Events Centre
SOPA Cup	6–8 March	New South Wales Swifts	^{(Note 1)}	Adelaide Thunderbirds	Sydney Olympic Park Sports Centre
Waipa Pre-Season Tournament	20–22 March	Waikato Bay of Plenty Magic	53–37	Northern Mystics	Te Awamutu Events Centre

Notes

- ^1 No final. Played as a round-robin tournament.

== Regular season ==
During the regular season the Australian teams played each other twice and the New Zealand teams once. The New Zealand teams also played each other twice and each of the Australian teams once. Melbourne Vixens won 12 of their 13 matches during the regular season. Their only defeat came in Round 10 against Waikato Bay of Plenty Magic, their main challengers for top spot. Vixens had to win their final two home matches with plenty of goals to guarantee top place. After a 63–35 win against Canterbury Tactix in Round 13, Vixens' defeated Central Pulse 80–39 in Round 14 to secure the minor premiership.

=== Round 1 ===
Saturday 4 April	Southern Steel	55–46	Central Pulse	Stadium Southland
2:00 pm	Daneka Wipiiti 37/42 (88%); Donna Wilkins 18/24 (75%)	Report; Stats	Paula Griffin 30/39 (77%); Jamilah Gupwell 16/20 (80%)

Saturday 4 April	Melbourne Vixens	57–44	West Coast Fever	State Netball Hockey Centre
14:00 (UTC+10)	Sharelle McMahon 29/35 (83%); Caitlin Thwaites 24/28 (86%); Ashlee Howard 4/5 (80%)	Report; Stats	Caitlin Bassett 38/47 (81%); Bianca Franklin 3/4 (75%); Nikala Smith 3/7 (43%)

Sunday 5 April, 2:30 pm	Queensland Firebirds	48–60	Adelaide Thunderbirds	Brisbane Convention and Exhibition Centre
2:30 pm	Romelda Aiken 33/37 (89%); Janelle Lawson 15/23 (65%)	Report; Stats	Kate Beveridge 32/42 (76%); Natalie Medhurst 28/33 (85%)

Monday 6 April	Northern Mystics	38–51	Waikato Bay of Plenty Magic	Trusts Stadium
7:00 pm	Grace Rasmussen 19/25 (76%); Cathrine Latu 11/12 (92%); Jade Topia 8/11 (73%)	Report; Stats	Irene van Dyk 31/37 (84%); Maria Tutaia 20/27 (74%)

Monday 6 April	New South Wales Swifts	62–45	Canterbury Tactix	Sydney Olympic Park Sports Centre
7:00 pm	Catherine Cox 34/37 (92%); Susan Pratley 17/19 (89%); Erin Bell 11/13 (85%)	Report; Stats	Jodi Brown 25/28 (89%); Angela Mitchell 20/26 (77%)	Umpires: Sharon Kelly; Helen George; Reserve umpire: Peta Quinn

=== Round 2 ===
Saturday 11 April	Waikato Bay of Plenty Magic	54–47	Southern Steel	Queen Elizabeth Youth Centre
2:00 pm	Irene van Dyk 38/38 (100%); Maria Tutaia 16/19 (84%)	Report; Stats	Daneka Wipiiti 29/38 (76%); Donna Wilkins 18/26 (69%)

Sunday 12 April	Adelaide Thunderbirds	48–47	New South Wales Swifts	ETSA Park
2:00 pm	Kate Beveridge 25/30 (83%); Natalie Medhurst 23/25 (92%)	Report; Stats	Catherine Cox 26/30 (87%); Susan Pratley 21/23 (91%)

Sunday 12 April	Northern Mystics	54–50	Central Pulse	North Shore Events Centre
6:30 pm	Cathrine Latu 34/38 (89%); Pamela Cookey 14/16 (88%)	Report; Stats	Paula Griffin 31/37 (84%); Jamilah Gupwell 19/25 (76%)

Monday 13 April	Canterbury Tactix	52–44	West Coast Fever	CBS Canterbury Arena
7:00 pm	Jodi Brown 43/49 (88%); Angela Mitchell 9/17 (53%)	Report; Stats	Caitlin Bassett 33/39 (85%); Bianca Franklin 6/8 (75%); Jasmine Keene 5/9 (56%)	Attendance: 3,700

Monday 13 April	Queensland Firebirds	51–54	Melbourne Vixens	Brisbane Convention and Exhibition Centre
19:00 (UTC+10)	Romelda Aiken 42/49 (86%); Alissa Castrisos 5/7 (71%); Janelle Lawson 4/8 (50%)	Report; Stats	Sharelle McMahon 27/29 (93%); Caitlin Thwaites 27/34 (79%)

=== Round 3 ===
Saturday 18 April	Central Pulse	46–58	Queensland Firebirds	TSB Bank Arena
2:00 pm	Paula Griffin 36/47 (77%); Jamilah Gupwell 8/13 (62%); Larissa Harrison 2/5 (40%)	Report; Stats	Romelda Aiken 46/60 (77%); Alissa Castrisos 12/14 (86%)

Sunday 19 April	Adelaide Thunderbirds	43–49	Melbourne Vixens	ETSA Park
14:00 (UTC+10)	Kate Beveridge 28/37 (76%); Natalie Medhurst 15/19 (79%)	Report; Stats	Sharelle McMahon 21/28 (75%); Caitlin Thwaites 28/35 (80%)

Sunday 19 April	Southern Steel	52–48	Canterbury Tactix	Edgar Centre
6:30 pm	Daneka Wipiiti 39/43 (91%); Donna Wilkins 13/17 (76%)	Report; Stats	Jodi Brown 32/36 (89%); Anna Thompson 12/16 (75%); Angela Mitchell 4/7 (57%)

Monday 20 April	Waikato Bay of Plenty Magic	63–45	New South Wales Swifts	Mystery Creek Events Centre
7:00 pm	Irene van Dyk 45/45 (100%); Maria Tutaia 14/15 (93%); Jessica Tuki 4/5 (80%)	Report; Stats	Catherine Cox 11/12 (92%); Susan Pratley 20/23 (87%); Erin Bell 14/17 (82%)

Monday 20 April	West Coast Fever	57–46	Northern Mystics	Challenge Stadium
5:00 pm	Caitlin Bassett 38/46 (83%); Bianca Franklin 19/26 (73%)	Report; Stats	Cathrine Latu 12/17 (71%); Pamela Cookey 24/32 (75%); Jade Topia 10/15 (67%)

=== Round 4 ===
Saturday 25 April	Central Pulse	54–60	West Coast Fever	Arena Manawatu
2:00 pm	Paula Griffin 39/50 (78%); Jamilah Gupwell 15/22 (68%)	Report; Stats	Caitlin Bassett 41/49 (84%); Bianca Franklin 19/25 (76%)

Saturday 25 April	Melbourne Vixens	48–31	Southern Steel	State Netball Hockey Centre
14:00 (UTC+10)	Sharelle McMahon 21/28 (75%); Caitlin Thwaites 27/35 (77%)	Report; Stats	Daneka Wipiiti 21/30 (70%); Donna Wilkins 10/16 (63%)

Sunday 26 April	Queensland Firebirds	53–42	Waikato Bay of Plenty Magic	Brisbane Convention and Exhibition Centre
2:30 pm	Romelda Aiken 42/55 (76%); Alissa Castrisos 11/16 (69%)	Report; Stats	Irene van Dyk 30/32 (94%); Maria Tutaia 12/18 (67%)

Monday 27 April	Canterbury Tactix	48–53	Adelaide Thunderbirds	CBS Canterbury Arena
7:00 pm	Jodi Brown 37/47 (79%); Anna Thompson 11/15 (73%)	Q4: 42–42; Report; Stats	Kate Beveridge 20/29 (69%); Natalie Medhurst 28/36 (78%); Jane Altschwager 5/9 (56%)

Monday 27 April	New South Wales Swifts	59–55	Northern Mystics	Sydney Olympic Park Sports Centre
7:00 pm	Catherine Cox 29/33 (88%); Susan Pratley 30/35 (86%)	Report; Stats	Cathrine Latu 38/40 (95%); Pamela Cookey 10/10 (100%); Grace Rasmussen 7/8 (88%)

=== Round 5 ===
Saturday 2 May	Canterbury Tactix	48–50	Waikato Bay of Plenty Magic	CBS Canterbury Arena
2:00 pm	Jodi Brown 33/38 (87%); Anna Thompson 15/18 (83%)	Stats	Irene van Dyk 29/32 (91%); Maria Tutaia 13/15 (87%); Jessica Tuki 8/14 (57%)

Sunday 3 May	Melbourne Vixens	50–42	Adelaide Thunderbirds	Hisense Arena
14:30 (UTC+10)	Sharelle McMahon 17/21 (81%); Caitlin Thwaites 29/34 (85%); Ashlee Howard 4/4 (100%)	Stats	Kate Beveridge 28/37 (76%); Natalie Medhurst 15/19 (79%)

Monday 4 May	Central Pulse	60–61	Northern Mystics	TSB Bank Arena
7:00 pm	Paula Griffin 39/48 (81%); Jamilah Gupwell 18/25 (72%); Te Amo Amaru-Tibble 3/5 (60%)	Q4: 50–50; Report; Stats	Cathrine Latu 19/20 (95%); Pamela Cookey 25/35 (71%); Jade Topia 17/19 (89%)

Monday 4 May	West Coast Fever	67–66	New South Wales Swifts	Challenge Stadium
6:00 pm	Caitlin Bassett 54/63 (86%); Bianca Franklin 7/8 (88%); Nikala Smith 6/8 (75%)	Q4: 54–54; Report; Stats	Catherine Cox 39/50 (78%); Susan Pratley 27/32 (84%)

BYES: Queensland Firebirds and Southern Steel

=== Round 6 ===
Saturday 9 May	Waikato Bay of Plenty Magic	59–36	Central Pulse	Mystery Creek Events Centre
2:00 pm	Irene van Dyk 35/37 (95%); Maria Tutaia 14/20 (70%); Halana Leith 10/11 (91%)	Report; Stats	Paula Griffin 25/35 (71%); Jamilah Gupwell 11/17 (65%)

Sunday 10 May	New South Wales Swifts	40–51	Adelaide Thunderbirds	Sydney Olympic Park Sports Centre
2:30 pm	Catherine Cox 9/15 (60%); Susan Pratley 22/27 (81%); Erin Bell 9/16 (56%)	Report; Stats	Kate Beveridge 43/47 (91%); Natalie Medhurst 8/10 (80%)

Monday 11 May	Northern Mystics	52–61	Southern Steel	Trusts Stadium
7:00 pm	Cathrine Latu 29/36 (81%); Pamela Cookey 23/26 (88%)	Report; Stats	Daneka Wipiiti 26/34 (76%); Donna Wilkins 35/37 (95%)

Monday 11 May	Queensland Firebirds	56–53	West Coast Fever	Brisbane Convention and Exhibition Centre
7:00 pm	Romelda Aiken 46/56 (82%); Alissa Castrisos 10/11 (91%)	Stats	Caitlin Bassett 32/37 (86%); Bianca Franklin 18/20 (90%); Nikala Smith 3/4 (75%)

BYES: Canterbury Tactix and Melbourne Vixens

=== Round 7 ===
Saturday 16 May	Canterbury Tactix	47–48	Southern Steel	CBS Canterbury Arena
2:00 pm	Jodi Brown 32/37 (86%); Anna Thompson 15/17 (88%)	Report; Stats	Daneka Wipiiti 30/34 (88%); Donna Wilkins 18/22 (82%)

Sunday 17 May	West Coast Fever	49–74	Melbourne Vixens	Challenge Stadium
12:30 (UTC+10)	Caitlin Bassett 41/48 (85%); Bianca Franklin 6/8 (75%); Jasmine Keene 2/3 (67%)	Report; Stats	Sharelle McMahon 40/47 (85%); Caitlin Thwaites 29/34 (85%); Ashlee Howard 5/7 (71%)

Monday 18 May	Waikato Bay of Plenty Magic	50–35	Northern Mystics	Energy Events Centre
7:00 pm	Irene van Dyk 32/34 (94%); Maria Tutaia 18/22 (82%)	Report; Stats	Cathrine Latu 12/17 (71%); Pamela Cookey 16/20 (80%); Jade Topia 7/9 (78%)

Monday 18 May	New South Wales Swifts	54–58	Queensland Firebirds	Sydney Olympic Park Sports Centre
7:00 pm	Catherine Cox 32/43 (74%); Susan Pratley 22/26 (85%)	Report; Stats	Romelda Aiken 51/60 (85%); Alissa Castrisos 4/7 (57%); Janelle Lawson 3/4 (75%)

BYES: Adelaide Thunderbirds and Central Pulse

=== Round 8 ===
Saturday 23 May	Canterbury Tactix	49–46	Central Pulse	CBS Canterbury Arena
2:00 pm	Jodi Brown 28/35 (80%); Anna Thompson 21/28 (75%)	Report; Stats	Paula Griffin 26/32 (81%); Jamilah Gupwell 4/6 (67%); Te Amo Amaru-Tibble 16/18 (89%)

Sunday 24 May	Adelaide Thunderbirds	51–50	Queensland Firebirds	ETSA Park
2:00 pm	Kate Beveridge 35/43 (81%); Natalie Medhurst 11/14 (79%); Jane Altschwager 5/7 (71%)	Report; Stats	Romelda Aiken 43/54 (80%); Alissa Castrisos 7/11 (64%)

Monday 25 May	Southern Steel	39–48	Waikato Bay of Plenty Magic	Stadium Southland
7:00 pm	Daneka Wipiiti 28/38 (74%); Donna Wilkins 11/16 (69%)	Report; Stats	Irene van Dyk 29/33 (88%); Maria Tutaia 10/13 (77%); Jessica Tuki 9/14 (64%)

Monday 25 May	Melbourne Vixens	65–63	New South Wales Swifts	Hisense Arena
19:00 (UTC+10)	Sharelle McMahon 22/25 (88%); Caitlin Thwaites 43/51 (84%)	Q4: 54–54; Report; Stats	Catherine Cox 40/50 (80%); Susan Pratley 23/26 (88%)

BYES: Northern Mystics and West Coast Fever

=== Round 9 ===
Saturday 30 May	Central Pulse	44–66	Southern Steel	TSB Bank Arena
2:00 pm	Paula Griffin 28/36 (78%); Jamilah Gupwell 4/9 (44%); Te Amo Amaru-Tibble 12/12 (100%)	Report; Stats	Daneka Wipiiti 31/34 (91%); Donna Wilkins 26/30 (87%); Julianna Naoupu 9/12 (75%)

Sunday 31 May	Melbourne Vixens	57–53	Queensland Firebirds	Hisense Arena
14:30 (UTC+10)	Sharelle McMahon 29/31 (94%); Caitlin Thwaites 28/35 (80%)	Report; Stats	Romelda Aiken 39/52 (75%); Alissa Castrisos 7/8 (88%); Janelle Lawson 7/10 (70%)

Monday 1 June	Northern Mystics	47–46	Canterbury Tactix	Trusts Stadium
7:00 pm	Cathrine Latu 20/26 (77%); Pamela Cookey 21/25 (84%); Jade Topia 6/10 (60%)	Report; Stats	Jodi Brown 27/31 (87%); Anna Thompson 19/23 (83%)

Monday 1 June	West Coast Fever	41–61	Adelaide Thunderbirds	Challenge Stadium
6:00 pm	Caitlin Bassett 25/31 (81%); Bianca Franklin 13/18 (72%); Nikala Smith 3/3 (100%)	Report; Stats	Kate Beveridge 28/38 (74%); Natalie Medhurst 33/39 (85%)

BYES: New South Wales Swifts and Waikato Bay of Plenty Magic

=== Round 10 ===
Saturday 6 June	Central Pulse	45–59	Canterbury Tactix	Te Rauparaha Arena
2:00 pm	Paula Griffin 24/28 (86%); Te Amo Amaru-Tibble 21/27 (78%)	Report; Stats	Jodi Brown 36/40 (90%); Angela Mitchell 15/18 (83%); Anna Thompson 5/6 (83%); Ellen Halpenny 3/5 (60%)

Saturday 6 June	Adelaide Thunderbirds	58–34	Northern Mystics	Distinctive Homes Dome
1:30 pm	Kate Beveridge 26/35 (74%); Natalie Medhurst 32/37 (86%)	Report; Stats	Cathrine Latu 23/30 (77%); Pamela Cookey 11/16 (69%)

Sunday 7 June	Queensland Firebirds	62–61	New South Wales Swifts	Brisbane Convention and Exhibition Centre
2:30 pm	Romelda Aiken 52/61 (85%); Alissa Castrisos 1/3 (33%); Janelle Lawson 9/11 (82%)	Report; Stats	Catherine Cox 39/49 (80%); Susan Pratley 22/28 (79%)

Monday 8 June	Waikato Bay of Plenty Magic	55–48	Melbourne Vixens	Queen Elizabeth Youth Centre
19:00 (UTC+10)	Irene van Dyk 35/36 (97%); Maria Tutaia 20/22 (91%)	Report; Stats	Sharelle McMahon 16/22 (73%); Caitlin Thwaites 32/36 (89%)

Monday 8 June	West Coast Fever	59–48	Southern Steel	Challenge Stadium
5:00 pm	Caitlin Bassett 45/54 (83%); Bianca Franklin 14/16 (88%)	Report; Stats	Daneka Wipiiti 25/32 (78%); Donna Wilkins 23/28 (82%); Julianna Naoupu 0/1 (0%)

=== Round 11 ===
Saturday 13 June	Canterbury Tactix	53–46	Queensland Firebirds	CBS Canterbury Arena
2:00 pm	Jodi Brown 34/37 (92%); Angela Mitchell 10/14 (71%); Anna Thompson 9/10 (90%)	Report; Stats	Romelda Aiken 35/37 (95%); Alissa Castrisos 9/12 (75%); Janelle Lawson 2/4 (50%)

Sunday 14 June	Adelaide Thunderbirds	58–39	West Coast Fever	ETSA Park
2:00 pm	Jane Altschwager 37/49 (76%); Kate Beveridge 5/12 (42%); Natalie Medhurst 16/17 (94%)	Report; Stats	Caitlin Bassett 28/31 (90%); Nikala Smith 10/13 (77%); Bianca Franklin 1/6 (17%)

Sunday 14 June	Central Pulse	35–67	Waikato Bay of Plenty Magic	TSB Bank Arena
6:30 pm	Paula Griffin 18/22 (82%); Te Amo Amaru-Tibble 13/15 (87%); Jamilah Gupwell 4/5 (80%)	Report; Stats	Irene van Dyk 29/30 (97%); Maria Tutaia 27/34 (79%); Jessica Tuki 11/14 (79%)

Monday 15 June	Southern Steel	52–50	Northern Mystics	Stadium Southland
7:00 pm	Daneka Wipiiti 29/33 (88%); Donna Wilkins 23/29 (79%)	Report; Stats	Jade Topia 24/29 (83%); Pamela Cookey 21/25 (84%); Cathrine Latu 5/6 (83%)

Monday 15 June	New South Wales Swifts	52–63	Melbourne Vixens	Sydney Olympic Park Sports Centre
19:00 (UTC+10)	Catherine Cox 32/38 (84%); Susan Pratley 20/22 (91%)	Report; Stats	Sharelle McMahon 16/19 (84%); Caitlin Thwaites 47/52 (90%)	Attendance: 4,200

=== Round 12 ===
Saturday 20 June	Northern Mystics	57–61	Melbourne Vixens	Trusts Stadium
14:00 (UTC+10)	Cathrine Latu 36/39 (92%); Pamela Cookey 21/22 (95%)	Report; Stats	Caitlin Thwaites 36/42 (86%); Ashlee Howard 25/27 (93%)

Saturday 20 June	Adelaide Thunderbirds	70–40	Central Pulse	ETSA Park
1:30 pm	Kate Beveridge 41/47 (87%); Natalie Medhurst 29/32 (91%)	Report; Stats	Paula Griffin 19/28 (68%); Te Amo Amaru-Tibble 21/26 (81%)

Sunday 21 June	New South Wales Swifts	60–63	West Coast Fever	Sydney Olympic Park Sports Centre
2:30 pm	Catherine Cox 43/50 (86%); Susan Pratley 17/19 (89%)	Report; Stats	Caitlin Bassett 51/54 (94%); Nikala Smith 3/5 (60%); Bianca Franklin 9/10 (90%)

Monday 22 June	Waikato Bay of Plenty Magic	50–46	Canterbury Tactix	Energy Events Centre
7:00 pm	Irene van Dyk 32/34 (94%); Maria Tutaia 18/24 (75%)	Report; Stats	Jodi Brown 30/38 (79%); Angela Mitchell 6/10 (60%); Anna Thompson 10/11 (91%)

Monday 22 June	Queensland Firebirds	52–50	Southern Steel	Brisbane Convention and Exhibition Centre
7:00 pm	Romelda Aiken 48/59 (81%); Alissa Castrisos 4/8 (50%)	Report; Stats	Donna Wilkins 32/35 (91%); Megan Dehn 18/21 (86%)

=== Round 13: Rivalry Round ===
Round 13 featured five Australia verses New Zealand matches. Goals scored by Australian and New Zealand teams were added together and the country with the most goals won the Rivalry Round Trophy. During the round, Waikato Bay of Plenty Magic became the first New Zealand team to win in Australia, defeating West Coast Fever 49–38. After 24 games, Central Pulse won their first match, defeating the reigning champions New South Wales Swifts 53–52. Southern Steel became the third New Zealand team to secure a win when they defeated Adelaide Thunderbirds 58-49. Despite New Zealand teams winning three of the five matches, Australia won the Rivalry Round Trophy 261–252.

Saturday 27 June	Northern Mystics	57–59	Queensland Firebirds	Trusts Stadium
2:00 pm	Cathrine Latu 35/39 (90%); Pamela Cookey 22/25 (88%)	Report; Stats	Romelda Aiken 47/52 (90%); Alissa Castrisos 6/8 (75%); Janelle Lawson 6/7 (86%)

Sunday 28 June	West Coast Fever	38–49	Waikato Bay of Plenty Magic	Challenge Stadium
12:30 pm	Caitlin Bassett 30/40 (75%); Nikala Smith 7/17 (41%); Jasmine Keene 1/1 (100%)	Report; Stats	Irene van Dyk 30/32 (94%); Maria Tutaia 19/24 (79%)

Sunday 28 June	Central Pulse	53–52	New South Wales Swifts	Te Rauparaha Arena
6:30 pm	Paula Griffin 35/39 (90%); Te Amo Amaru-Tibble 18/21 (86%)	Report; Stats	Catherine Cox 26/36 (72%); Susan Pratley 26/32 (81%)

Monday 29 June	Southern Steel	58–49	Adelaide Thunderbirds	Edgar Centre
7:00 pm	Donna Wilkins 36/41 (88%); Megan Dehn 22/28 (79%)	Report; Stats	Kate Beveridge 26/31 (84%); Natalie Medhurst 23/26 (88%)

Monday 29 June	Melbourne Vixens	63–35	Canterbury Tactix	Hisense Arena
19:00 (UTC+10)	Sharelle McMahon 32/37 (86%); Caitlin Thwaites 23/28 (82%); Kathleen Knott 8/12 (67%)	Report; Stats	Jodi Brown 20/29 (69%); Angela Mitchell 15/23 (65%)

=== Round 14 ===
Saturday 4 July	Southern Steel	55–48	New South Wales Swifts	Stadium Southland
2:00 pm	Donna Wilkins 36/38 (95%); Megan Dehn 19/23 (83%)	Report; Stats	Catherine Cox 29/35 (83%); Susan Pratley 19/25 (76%)

Saturday 4 July	Melbourne Vixens	80–39	Central Pulse	Hisense Arena
14:00 (UTC+10)	Sharelle McMahon 25/29 (86%); Caitlin Thwaites 37/42 (88%); Ashlee Howard 18/19 (95%)	Report; Stats	Paula Griffin 24/28 (86%); Te Amo Amaru-Tibble 8/11 (73%); Larissa Harrison 5/6 (83%); Jamilah Gupwell 2/3 (67%)

Sunday 5 July	Adelaide Thunderbirds	54–35	Waikato Bay of Plenty Magic	Distinctive Homes Dome
2:00 pm	Kate Beveridge 29/35 (83%); Natalie Medhurst 25/29 (86%)	Report; Stats	Irene van Dyk 19/24 (79%); Maria Tutaia 16/23 (70%)

Monday 6 July	Canterbury Tactix	63–56	Northern Mystics	CBS Canterbury Arena
7:00 pm	Jodi Brown 34/41 (83%); Anna Thompson 15/15 (100%); Angela Mitchell 12/19 (63%); Ellen Halpenny 2/3 (67%)	Report; Stats	Cathrine Latu 36/39 (92%); Pamela Cookey 16/17 (94%); Jade Topia 4/4 (100%)

Monday 6 July	West Coast Fever	52–54	Queensland Firebirds	Challenge Stadium
6:00 pm	Caitlin Bassett 41/53 (77%); Nikala Smith 7/10 (70%); Bianca Franklin 4/8 (50%)	Report; Stats	Romelda Aiken 45/54 (83%); Janelle Lawson 9/15 (60%); Alissa Castrisos 0/1 (0%)

== Final table ==
2009 ANZ Championship ladder
Pos	Team	Pld	W	D	L	GF	GA	G%	Pts
1	Melbourne Vixens	13	12	0	1	769	614	125.24	24
2	Waikato Bay of Plenty Magic	13	11	0	2	673	562	119.75	22
3	Adelaide Thunderbirds	13	10	0	3	698	579	120.55	20
4	Southern Steel	13	8	0	5	662	645	102.64	16
5	Queensland Firebirds	13	8	0	5	700	690	101.45	16
6	Canterbury Tactix	13	5	0	8	639	662	96.53	10
7	West Coast Fever	13	5	0	8	666	735	90.61	10
8	Northern Mystics	13	3	0	10	642	727	88.31	6
9	New South Wales Swifts	13	2	0	11	709	748	94.79	4
10	Central Pulse	13	1	0	12	594	790	75.19	2
Updated 20 February 2021

Qualified for Major semi-final
Qualified for Minor semi-final

- Pld = Games played
- W = Win (2 points)
- D = Draw (1 point)
- L = Loss (0 points)
- GF = Goals For (Total goals scored)
- GA = Goals Against (Total goals conceded)
- G% = Goal percentage (= 100 × GF/GA)
- Pts = Points

== Playoffs ==
Semifinals
Sunday 12 July – Melbourne
Melbourne Vixens	58
Waikato Bay of Plenty Magic	43
Monday 13 July – Adelaide
Adelaide Thunderbirds	51
Southern Steel	45

Preliminary final
Sunday 19 July – Hamilton
Waikato Bay of Plenty Magic	37
Adelaide Thunderbirds	51

Grand final
Sunday 26 July – Melbourne
Melbourne Vixens	54
Adelaide Thunderbirds	46

=== Major semi-final ===
Sunday 12 July; 14:30 (UTC+10)	Stats	Melbourne Vixens	58–43	Waikato Bay of Plenty Magic	Hisense Arena
Sunday 12 July; 14:30 (UTC+10)	Stats	Scoring by quarter: 16-10, 14-14, 14-7, 14-12			Hisense Arena
Sunday 12 July; 14:30 (UTC+10)	Stats	Caitlin Thwaites 35/41 (85%); Sharelle McMahon 21/22 (95%); Ashlee Howard 2/2 (100%)		Irene van Dyk 24/25 (96%); Maria Tutaia 19/23 (83%)	Hisense Arena

=== Minor semi-final ===
Monday 13 July; 18:30 (UTC+9:30)	Stats	Adelaide Thunderbirds	51–45	Southern Steel	ETSA Park
Monday 13 July; 18:30 (UTC+9:30)	Stats	Scoring by quarter: 12-11, 15-11, 11-10, 13-13			ETSA Park
Monday 13 July; 18:30 (UTC+9:30)	Stats	Kate Beveridge 31/36 (86%); Natalie Medhurst 20/21 (95%)		Megan Dehn 23/27 (85%); Donna Wilkins 22/24 (92%)	ETSA Park

=== Preliminary final ===
Sunday 19 July; 19:00 (UTC+12)	Stats	Waikato Bay of Plenty Magic	37–51	Adelaide Thunderbirds	Mystery Creek Events Centre
Sunday 19 July; 19:00 (UTC+12)	Stats	Scoring by quarter: 8-11, 10-13, 8-14, 11-13			Mystery Creek Events Centre
Sunday 19 July; 19:00 (UTC+12)	Stats	Irene van Dyk 25/26 (96%); Maria Tutaia 12/17 (71%)		Kate Beveridge 28/30 (93%); Natalie Medhurst 22/25 (88%); Jane Altschwager 1/2 (50%)	Mystery Creek Events Centre

=== Grand final ===
Sunday 26 July; 14:30 (UTC+10)	Stats	Melbourne Vixens	54–46	Adelaide Thunderbirds	Hisense Arena; Attendance: 9,500
Sunday 26 July; 14:30 (UTC+10)	Stats	Scoring by quarter: 13-13, 14-6, 14-13, 13-14			Hisense Arena; Attendance: 9,500
Sunday 26 July; 14:30 (UTC+10)	Stats	Caitlin Thwaites 31/39 (79%); Sharelle McMahon 23/28 (82%)		Kate Beveridge 28/34 (82%); Natalie Medhurst 18/23 (78%); Jane Altschwager 1/2 (50%)	Hisense Arena; Attendance: 9,500

== Award winners ==
=== ANZ Championship awards ===
Award	Winner	Team
Most Valuable Player	(Jamaica) Romelda Aiken	Queensland Firebirds
Grand Final MVP	(Australia) Sharelle McMahon	Melbourne Vixens

=== Australian Netball Awards ===
Award	Winner	Team
Liz Ellis Diamond	(Australia) Julie Corletto	Melbourne Vixens
Australian ANZ Championship Player of the Year	(Australia) Natalie von Bertouch	Adelaide Thunderbirds
Australian ANZ Championship Coach of the Year	(Australia) Julie Hoornweg	Melbourne Vixens

== Media coverage ==
In 2009 the ANZ Championship TV partners included Network 10 and One HD in Australia and Sky Sport (New Zealand). Television audiences were up 52% across Australia and New Zealand, from 5.8 million to 8.8 million. During the season, an average of 229,000 viewers watched per game. The grand final TV audience peaked at 354,329 viewers and the cumulative audience across both countries was over 11 million. Before the Round 12 match between New South Wales Swifts and West Coast Fever, Sydney Olympic Park Sports Centre hosted a charity match, billed as Netball's Festival of Stars. The match was viewed by a television audience of 345,164 viewers.

== Gallery ==
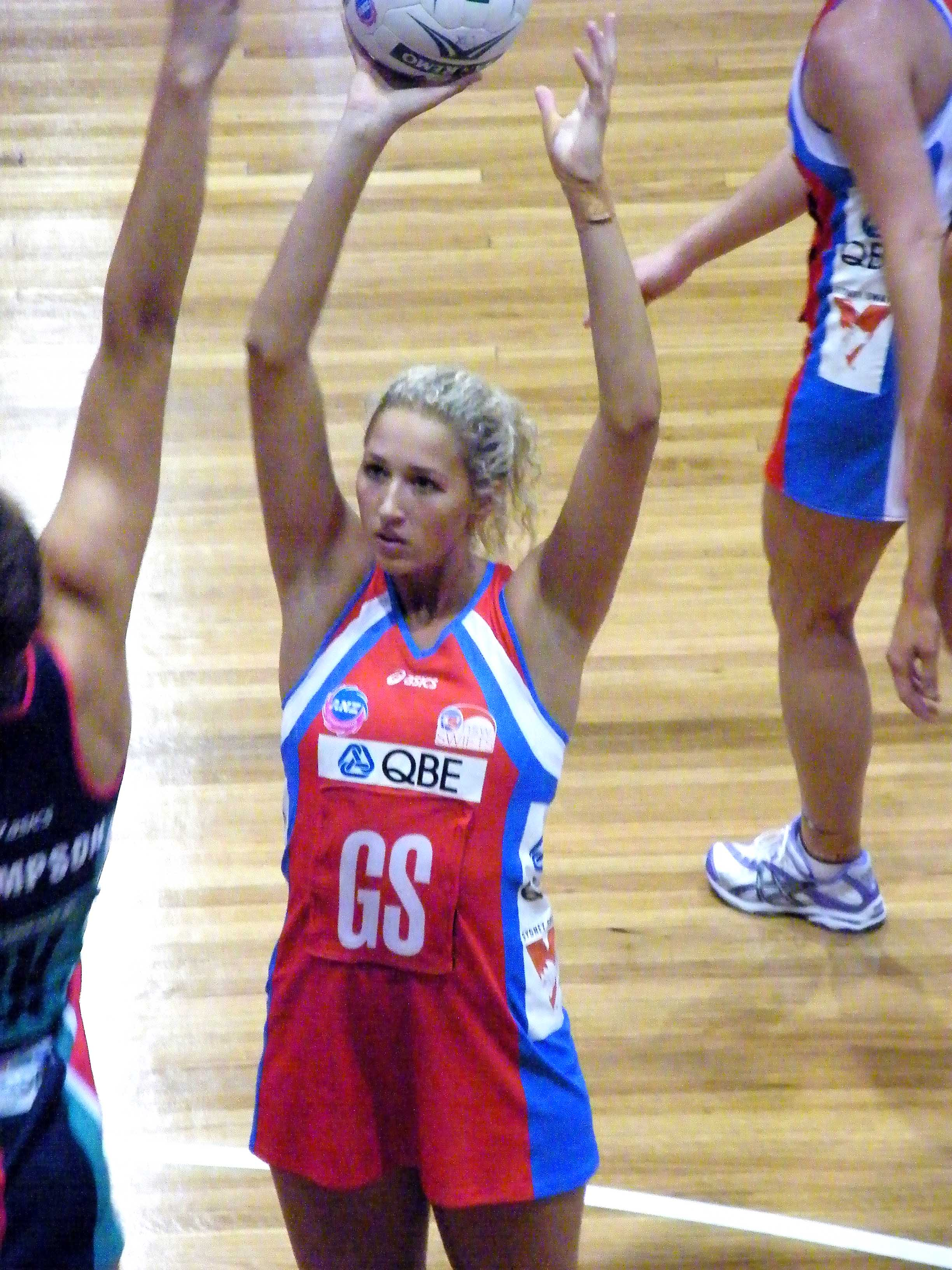
7 March 2009; Erin Bell (GS) of New South Wales Swifts prepares to shoot against Brooke Thompson (GK) of Melbourne Vixens during the pre-season tournament, the 2009 SOPA Cup. Bell subsequently made her ANZ Championship debut with Swifts in the Round 1 match against Canterbury Tactix.

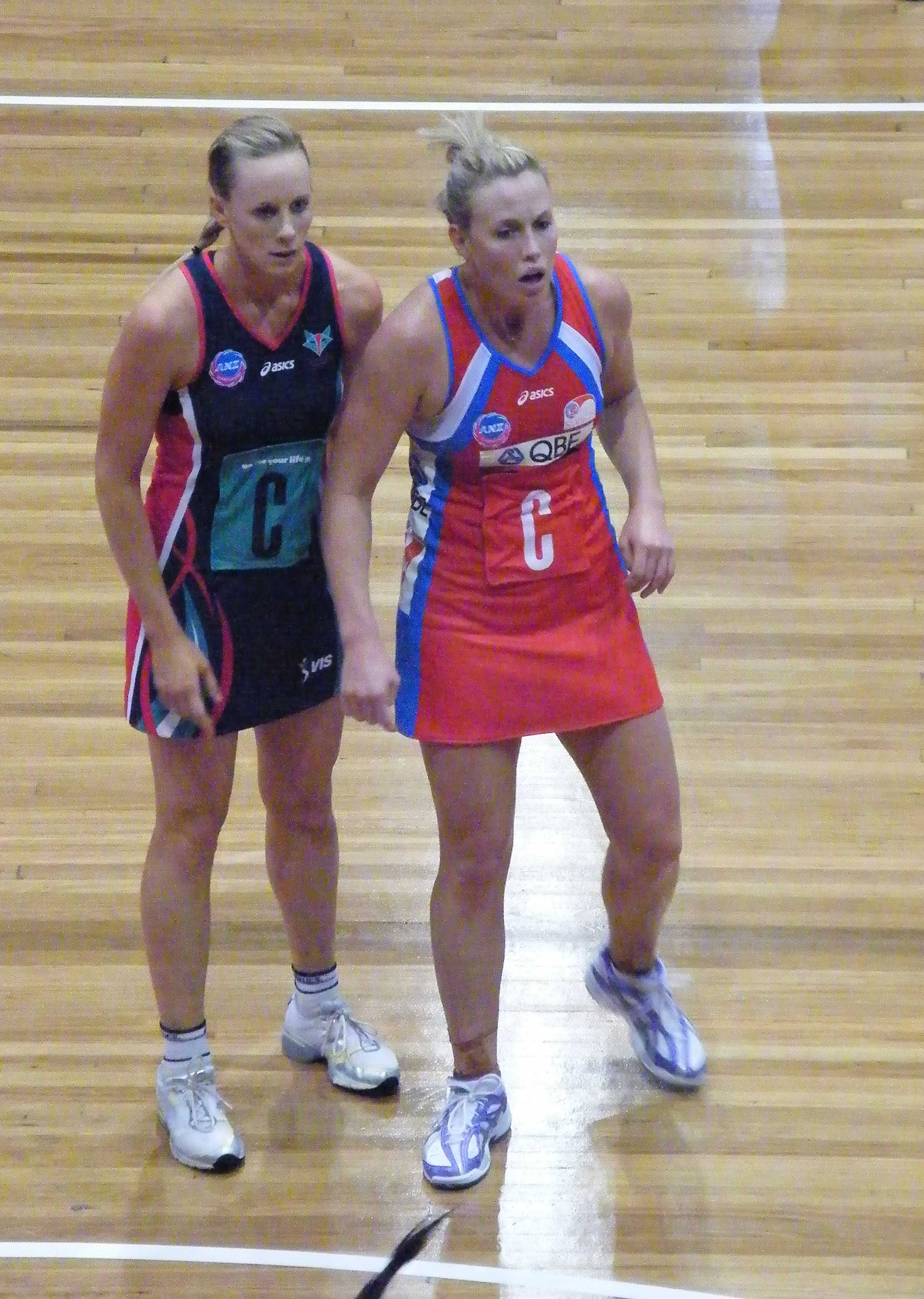
7 March 2009; Renae Hallinan (left) of Melbourne Vixens and Kimberlee Green (right) of New South Wales Swifts during the pre-season tournament, the 2009 SOPA Cup.

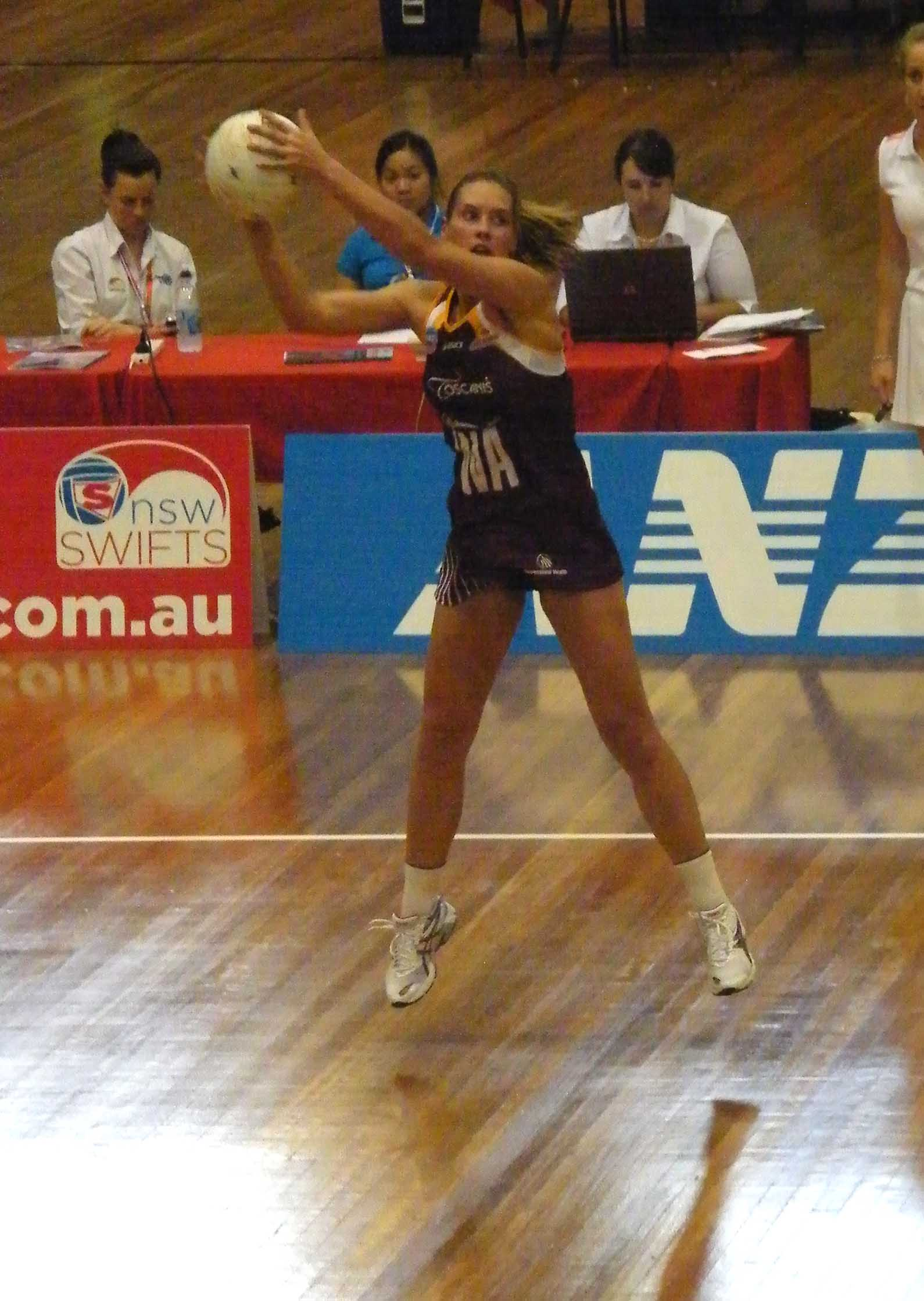
7 March 2009; Tamsin Greenway playing for Queensland Firebirds during the pre-season tournament, the 2009 SOPA Cup.
