= 2011 Northern Mystics season =

Northern Mystics season

Northern Mystics
- 2011 season
- Head coach: Debbie Fuller
- Asst. coach: Jenny-May Coffin
- Manager: Chris Tennant
- Captain: Temepara George
- Main venue: Trusts Stadium

Season results
- Wins–losses: 11–5
- Regular season: 4th
- Finals placing: 2nd
- Team colours

Northern Mystics seasons
- ← 2010 2012 →

The 2011 Northern Mystics season saw Northern Mystics compete in the 2011 ANZ Championship. With a team coached by Debbie Fuller and captained by Temepara George, Mystics finished the regular season fourth behind Queensland Firebirds, Waikato Bay of Plenty Magic and New South Wales Swifts. During the regular season, Mystics claimed their first win in Australia, with a 56–54 win over West Coast Fever in Round 9. Mystics defeated Swifts in the minor semi-final and Magic in the preliminary final before losing to Firebirds in the grand final. Mystics finished the season second overall.

== Players ==
=== Player movements ===
| ▲ Gains | ▼ Losses |
|---|---|
| Megan Dehn (Southern Steel); Kayla McAlister New signing; Jessica Moulds Otago (NPC); Rachel Rasmussen (Central Pulse); Anna Scarlett New signing | Althea Byfield Not signed; Jenny-May Coffin Appointed assistant coach; Finau Pulu (Canterbury Tactix); Sulu Tone–Fitzpatrick (Waikato Bay of Plenty Magic); Larrissa Willcox Not signed |

=== Roster ===
2011 Northern Mystics roster
Players
Coaching staff

| Nat. | Name | Position(s) | DoB | Height |
|---|---|---|---|---|
| (New Zealand) | Kayla Cullen | GD, WD, C | 13 February 1992 (aged 19) | 1.83 m (6 ft 0 in) |
| (Australia) | Megan Dehn | GA, WA, GS | 9 November 1974 (aged 36) | 1.78 m (5 ft 10 in) |
| (New Zealand) | Temepara George (c) | C, WA | 23 October 1975 (aged 35) | 1.70 m (5 ft 7 in) |
| (New Zealand) | Joline Henry | WD, GD, GK, C | 29 September 1982 (aged 28) | 1.83 m (6 ft 0 in) |
| (New Zealand) | Cathrine Latu | GS, GA | 25 October 1986 (aged 24) | 1.89 m (6 ft 2 in) |
| (New Zealand) | Kayla McAlister | WA, C, WD | 6 August 1988 (aged 22) | 1.68 m (5 ft 6 in) |
| (New Zealand) | Bailey Mes | GS, GA | 27 May 1989 (aged 21) | 1.87 m (6 ft 2 in) |
| (New Zealand) | Jessica Moulds | GK, GD | 8 November 1989 (aged 21) | 1.88 m (6 ft 2 in) |
| (New Zealand) | Grace Rasmussen (injured) | GA, WA | 18 March 1988 (aged 22) | 1.77 m (5 ft 10 in) |
| (New Zealand) | Rachel Rasmussen | GK, GD | 5 June 1984 (aged 26) | 1.83 m (6 ft 0 in) |
| (New Zealand) | Anna Scarlett | GK, GD, WD | 15 April 1983 (aged 27) | 1.87 m (6 ft 2 in) |
| (New Zealand) | Maria Tutaia | GA, GS | 18 February 1987 (aged 24) | 1.88 m (6 ft 2 in) |
| (New Zealand) | Portia Woodman (TRP) | | 12 July 1991 (aged 19) | 1.70 m (5 ft 7 in) |

Head coach

- (New Zealand) Debbie Fuller

Assistant coach

- (New Zealand) Jenny-May Coffin

Manager: Chris Tennant

Notes

- (c) – Captain
- (cc) – Co-captain
- (vc) – Vice-captain
- – Injury / maternity leave
- (TRP) – Temporary Replacement Player

=== Milestones ===
- Temepara George played her 50th ANZ Championship/Mystics match in Round 10 against New South Wales Swifts.
- Cathrine Latu played her 50th ANZ Championship/Mystics match in Round 11 against Canterbury Tactix.

== Pre-season ==
Waikato Bay of Plenty Magic and Northern Mystics played a five-quarter match during pre-season.

| 6 February | Waikato Bay of Plenty Magic | 62–54 | Northern Mystics | Te Awamutu |

== Regular season ==
=== Fixtures and results ===
Round 1

| Mon 14 February | Northern Mystics | 51 – 34 | Southern Steel | Trusts Stadium |
| 19:40 (UTC+11) | Cathrine Latu 30/35 (86%); Maria Tutaia 21/29 (72%) | Report; Stats | Tania Dalton 6/6 (100%); Paula Griffin 16/21 (76%); Te Paea Selby-Rickit 12/20 (60%) |

Round 2

| Sat 19 February | Central Pulse | 44 – 54 | Northern Mystics | Te Rauparaha Arena |
| 16:20 UTC+13 | Te Amo Amaru-Tibble 3/5 (60%); Amber Bellringer 14/20 (70%); Caitlin Thwaites 27/35 (77%) | Report; Stats | Cathrine Latu 36/36 (100%); Bailey Mes 0/2 (0%); Maria Tutaia 18/23 (78%) |

Round 3

| Thu 24 February | Northern Mystics | 39 – 45 | Waikato Bay of Plenty Magic | Trusts Stadium |
| 19:40 (UTC+13) | Cathrine Latu 22/27 (81%); Maria Tutaia 17/27 (63%) | Report; Stats | Jamilah Gupwell 9/13 (69%); Julianna Naoupu 7/12 (58%); Irene van Dyk 29/33 (88%) |

| Sun 27 February | Canterbury Tactix | v | Northern Mystics ^{(Note 1)} |
| 19:30 (UTC+12) |

Round 4

| Sun 6 March | Northern Mystics | 56 – 54 | Melbourne Vixens | Trusts Stadium |
| 18:20 (UTC+13) | Megan Dehn 5/6 (83%); Cathrine Latu 40/42 (95%); Maria Tutaia 11/16 (69%) | Report; Stats | Kate Beveridge 29/37 (78%); Sharelle McMahon 25/30 (83%) |

Round 5

| Sun 13 March | Waikato Bay of Plenty Magic | 46 – 47 | Northern Mystics | Mystery Creek Events Centre |
| 18:20 (UTC+13) | Julianna Naoupu 20/31 (65%); Irene van Dyk 26/31 (84%) | Report; Stats | Megan Dehn 3/5 (60%); Cathrine Latu 23/26 (88%); Maria Tutaia 21/23 (91%) |

Round 6

| Mon 21 March | Adelaide Thunderbirds | 57 – 55 | Northern Mystics | ETSA Park |
| 19:10 (UTC+10:30) | Erin Bell 21/24 (88%); Carla Borrego 36/41 (88%) | Report; Stats | Cathrine Latu 29/31 (94%); Maria Tutaia 26/31 (84%) |

Round 7

| Sat 26 March | Northern Mystics | 52 – 61 | Queensland Firebirds | Trusts Stadium |
| 16:20 (UTC+13) | Cathrine Latu 19/19 (100%); Maria Tutaia 33/38 (87%) | Report; Stats | Romelda Aiken 38/43 (88%); Natalie Medhurst 23/26 (88%) |

Round 8

| Sat 2 April | Northern Mystics | 61 – 48 | Central Pulse | Trusts Stadium |
| 16:20 (UTC+13) | Megan Dehn 7/8 (88%); Cathrine Latu 42/42 (100%); Maria Tutaia 12/14 (86%) | Report; Stats | Te Amo Amaru-Tibble 4/6 (67%); Amber Bellringer 9/18 (50%); Alanah Cassidy 1/1 (100%); Caitlin Thwaites 34/42 (81%) |

Round 9

| Thu 7 April | Canterbury Tactix | 45 – 58 | Northern Mystics ^{(Note 1)} | Vector Arena |
| 19:30 (UTC+12) | Ellen Halpenny 2/4 (50%); Anna Thompson 11/17 (65%); Donna Wilkins 32/35 (91%) | Report; Stats | Cathrine Latu 29/32 (91%); Bailey Mes 6/8 (75%); Maria Tutaia 23/30 (77%) |

| Mon 11 April | West Coast Fever | 54 – 56 | Northern Mystics | Challenge Stadium |
| 17:40 (UTC+8) | Caitlin Bassett 41/44 (93%); Leah Shoard 13/17 (76%) | Report; Stats | Cathrine Latu 30/35 (86%); Maria Tutaia 26/35 (74%) |

Round 10

| Mon 18 April | New South Wales Swifts | 53 – 46 | Northern Mystics | Sydney Olympic Park Sports Centre |
| 19:40 (UTC+10) | Catherine Cox 37/48 (77%); Susan Pratley 16/23 (70%) | Report; Stats | Megan Dehn 2/2 (100%); Cathrine Latu 17/17 (100%); Bailey Mes 1/4 (25%); Maria Tutaia 26/29 (90%) |

Round 11

| Sun 24 April | Northern Mystics | 62 – 43 | Canterbury Tactix | Trusts Stadium |
| 18:20 (UTC+12) | Cathrine Latu 45/48 (94%); Maria Tutaia 17/23 (74%) | Report; Stats | Ellen Halpenny 2/3 (67%); Anna Thompson 22/28 (79%); Donna Wilkins 19/22 (86%) |

Round 12

| Sun 1 May | Southern Steel | 35 – 46 | Northern Mystics | Invercargill ILT Velodrome |
| 18:20 (UTC+12) | Paula Griffin 22/30 (73%); Te Paea Selby-Rickit 4/6 (67%); Daneka Wipiiti 9/19 (47%) | Report; Stats | Cathrine Latu 26/26 (100%); Maria Tutaia 20/32 (63%) |

Notes

- ^1 The Round 3 match between Canterbury Tactix and Northern Mystics was due to be played on 27 February. However it was postponed due to the 2011 Christchurch earthquake. The match was rescheduled for 7 April.

=== Standings ===
2011 ANZ Championship ladder
| Pos | Team | Pld | W | L | GF | GA | GD | G% | Pts |
|---|---|---|---|---|---|---|---|---|---|
| 1 | Queensland Firebirds | 13 | 13 | 0 | 758 | 587 | 171 | 129.13 | 26 |
| 2 | Waikato Bay of Plenty Magic | 13 | 10 | 3 | 647 | 578 | 69 | 111.94 | 20 |
| 3 | New South Wales Swifts | 13 | 9 | 4 | 677 | 606 | 71 | 111.72 | 18 |
| 4 | Northern Mystics | 13 | 9 | 4 | 684 | 619 | 65 | 110.5 | 18 |
| 5 | Melbourne Vixens | 13 | 8 | 5 | 664 | 610 | 54 | 108.85 | 16 |
| 6 | Adelaide Thunderbirds | 13 | 5 | 8 | 662 | 737 | -75 | 89.82 | 10 |
| 7 | Southern Steel | 13 | 4 | 9 | 533 | 594 | -61 | 89.73 | 8 |
| 8 | Central Pulse | 13 | 3 | 10 | 599 | 683 | -84 | 87.7 | 6 |
| 9 | West Coast Fever | 13 | 3 | 10 | 646 | 754 | -108 | 85.68 | 6 |
| 10 | Canterbury Tactix | 13 | 1 | 12 | 621 | 723 | -102 | 85.89 | 2 |
Updated 8 March 2021

Qualified for Major semi-final
Qualified for Minor semi-final

- Pld = Games played
- W = Win (2 points)
- L = Loss (0 points)
- GF = Goals For
- GA = Goals Against
- GD = Goals Difference (= GF−GA)
- G% = Goal percentage (= 100 × GF/GA)

Pts = Points

== Finals ==
=== Minor semifinal ===
| Sunday 8 May; 14:20 (UTC+10) | Stats | New South Wales Swifts | 44–49 | Northern Mystics | Sydney Olympic Park Sports Centre; Umpires: Rachael Ayre (Australia); Mandy Nottingham (New Zealand); Reserve umpire: Jemma Carlton (Australia) | TEN; SKYSport |
| Sunday 8 May; 14:20 (UTC+10) | Stats | Scoring by quarter: 11-15, 9-13, 11–10, 13-11 | | | Sydney Olympic Park Sports Centre; Umpires: Rachael Ayre (Australia); Mandy Nottingham (New Zealand); Reserve umpire: Jemma Carlton (Australia) | TEN; SKYSport |
| Sunday 8 May; 14:20 (UTC+10) | Stats | Catherine Cox 28/36 (78%); Amorette Wild 8/8 (100%); Susan Pratley 8/10 (80%) | | Cathrine Latu 25/28 (89%); Maria Tutaia 24/29 (83%) | Sydney Olympic Park Sports Centre; Umpires: Rachael Ayre (Australia); Mandy Nottingham (New Zealand); Reserve umpire: Jemma Carlton (Australia) | TEN; SKYSport |

=== Preliminary final ===
| Sunday 15 May; 18:20 (UTC+12) | Report; Stats | Waikato Bay of Plenty Magic | 42–43 | Northern Mystics | Mystery Creek Events Centre | TEN; SKYSport |
| Sunday 15 May; 18:20 (UTC+12) | Report; Stats | Scoring by quarter: 13–9, 7-16, 12–10, 10-8 | | | Mystery Creek Events Centre | TEN; SKYSport |
| Sunday 15 May; 18:20 (UTC+12) | Report; Stats | Irene van Dyk 27/28 (96%); Julianna Naoupu 14/19 (74%); Jamilah Gupwell 1/3 (33%) | | Cathrine Latu 15/17 (88%); Maria Tutaia 28/30 (93%) | Mystery Creek Events Centre | TEN; SKYSport |

=== Grand final ===
| Sunday 22 May; 14:30 (UTC+10) | Report; Stats | Queensland Firebirds | 57–44 | Northern Mystics | Brisbane Convention & Exhibition Centre; Attendance: 3,541; Umpires: Sharon Kelly (Australia); Mandy Nottingham (New Zealand); Reserve umpire: Rachael Ayre (Australia) | TEN; SKYSport |
| Sunday 22 May; 14:30 (UTC+10) | Report; Stats | Scoring by quarter: 12–12, 14–12, 18–8, 13-12 | | | Brisbane Convention & Exhibition Centre; Attendance: 3,541; Umpires: Sharon Kelly (Australia); Mandy Nottingham (New Zealand); Reserve umpire: Rachael Ayre (Australia) | TEN; SKYSport |
| Sunday 22 May; 14:30 (UTC+10) | Report; Stats | Romelda Aiken 35/40 (88%); Natalie Medhurst 22/24 (92%) | | Cathrine Latu 21/21 (100%); Maria Tutaia 23/31 (74%) | Brisbane Convention & Exhibition Centre; Attendance: 3,541; Umpires: Sharon Kelly (Australia); Mandy Nottingham (New Zealand); Reserve umpire: Rachael Ayre (Australia) | TEN; SKYSport |

== Statistics ==
| Player | GS | GA | G% | A | R | CPR | I | D | P | T |
|---|---|---|---|---|---|---|---|---|---|---|
| Kayla Cullen | 0 | 0 | 0 | 3 | 20 | 120 | 21 | 49 | 169 | 14 |
| Megan Dehn | 17 | 21 | 81.0 | 112 | 1 | 160 | 5 | 3 | 47 | 27 |
| Temepara George | 0 | 0 | 0 | 195 | 0 | 1 | 12 | 23 | 140 | 68 |
| Joline Henry | 0 | 0 | 0 | 4 | 17 | 55 | 9 | 25 | 75 | 17 |
| Cathrine Latu | 449 | 482 | 93.2 | 13 | 42 | 0 | 1 | 7 | 81 | 81 |
| Kayla McAlister | 0 | 0 | 0 | 0 | 0 | 0 | 0 | 0 | 0 | 0 |
| Bailey Mes | 7 | 14 | 50.0 | 1 | 0 | 1 | 0 | 1 | 3 | 2 |
| Jessica Moulds | 0 | 0 | 0 | 0 | 3 | 0 | 5 | 14 | 16 | 2 |
| Grace Rasmussen | 0 | 0 | 0 | 87 | 1 | 130 | 4 | 3 | 42 | 31 |
| Rachel Rasmussen | 0 | 0 | 0 | 0 | 12 | 0 | 13 | 15 | 120 | 18 |
| Anna Scarlett | 0 | 0 | 0 | 1 | 34 | 62 | 33 | 91 | 245 | 19 |
| Maria Tutaia | 346 | 440 | 78.6 | 87 | 2 | 228 | 2 | 8 | 67 | 34 |
| Portia Woodman | 0 | 0 | 0 | 0 | 0 | 4 | 2 | 1 | 7 | 1 |

Statistics key
| GS | Goals scored | A | Assists | I | Intercepts |
| GA | Goal attempts | R | Rebounds | D | Deflections |
| G% | Goal percentage | CPR | Centre pass receives | P | Penalties |
| = Competition leader | | | | T | Turnovers conceded |

== Award winners ==
=== ANZ Championship awards ===
| Award | Winner |
|---|---|
| ANZ Championship Best Young Player | Kayla Cullen |

=== All Star Team ===
| Position | Player |
|---|---|
| WD | Kayla Cullen |
| GD | Anna Scarlett |
