= Netball's Festival of Stars =

Netball competitions in Australia

- Founded: 2009
- First season: 2009
- Owner: ANZ Championship
- No. of teams: 2
- Country: Australia
- Broadcasters: Network 10; ONE HD
- Sponsors: ANZ; Holden; Mars

Netball's Festival of Stars was a series of celebrity netball matches organised by Network Ten and the ANZ Championship. It featured two teams representing two Australian charities, Beyond Blue and the National Breast Cancer Foundation. Matches featured two halves of fifteen minutes and were played before an ANZ Championship regular season match.

== 2009 ==
The inaugural Festival of Stars was hosted at Sydney Olympic Park Sports Centre on 21 June 2009, before the 2009 ANZ Championship Round 12 match between New South Wales Swifts and West Coast Fever. Team Beyond Blue and Team NBCF were captained by Network 10 commentators, Luke Darcy and Liz Ellis, respectively. Team Beyond Blue, coached by Julie Fitzgerald, won the game following a penalty shoot-out between the two captains. The match was viewed by a television audience of 345,164 viewers.

Match summary

20 May 2012	Team Beyond Blue	v	Team NBCF	Sydney Olympic Park Sports Centre

Teams

Head Coach: Julie Fitzgerald Team: Luke Darcy (c); Wil Anderson; Chris Grant; Melissa Wu; C Shelley O'Donnell; Andy Maher; Kirk Pengilly	Head Coach: Matthew Elliott Team: Liz Ellis (c); John Eales; Adam Spencer; Layne Beachley; Marianne McCormick; Nathan Hindmarsh; Bill Woods Substitutes: C Ashlee Weir for McCormick

== 2010 ==
The second Festival of Stars was hosted at Hisense Arena on 6 June 2010, before the 2010 ANZ Championship Round 12 match between Melbourne Vixens and Adelaide Thunderbirds. Once again Team Beyond Blue and Team NBCF were captained by Luke Darcy and Liz Ellis, respectively. The match featured two fifteen minute halves and was umpired by Natalie Medhurst and Wendy Fleming, a former Australia under-21 international. ANZ donated $1,000 for the first goal scored in each half and $100 for every other goal scored in the match. This raised $20,000 for the two charities.

Match summary

6 June 2010	Mars Team Beyond Blue	11–9	Holden Cruze Team NBCF	Hisense Arena; Umpires: Natalie Medhurst; Wendy Fleming
6 June 2010	Scoring by half: 4-3, 7-6			Hisense Arena; Umpires: Natalie Medhurst; Wendy Fleming
6 June 2010	Luke Darcy; Dave Hughes; Rebecca Twigley		Ryan Moloney; Adam Spencer; Caitlin Thwaites	Hisense Arena; Umpires: Natalie Medhurst; Wendy Fleming

Teams

Starting 7: GS Luke Darcy (c); GA Dave Hughes; WA Rebecca Twigley; C Shelley O'Donnell; WD Mieke Buchan; GD Anthony Lehmann; GK James Tomkins Changes: Twigley to GA; Hughes to WD	Starting 7: GS Ryan Moloney; GA Adam Spencer; WA Brigitte Duclos; C Lydia Lassila; WD Adam Swanson; GD Glenn Archer; GK Liz Ellis (c) Changes: Ellis to WD; Archer to GD; Swanson to GK; Moloney to WD; Ellis to GK Substitutes: GS Caitlin Thwaites for Swanson

== 2011 ==
The third Festival of Stars was hosted at Sydney Olympic Park Sports Centre on 20 March 2011, before the 2011 ANZ Championship Round 6 match between New South Wales Swifts and Queensland Firebirds. Team Beyond Blue and Team NBCF were captained by comedians, Charlie Pickering and Adam Spencer, respectively. This was the third time Spencer played for Team NBCF. The show was hosted by Kelli Underwood and Liz Ellis with Sue Gaudion as the courtside expert. The event raised $13,800 for the two charities. Kerri Pottharst's nine goal tally helped Team NBCF win the match for the first time. Other notable performers included Iron Men Shannon Eckstein, who scored seven goals for Team Beyond Blue, and Matt Poole, who was named Player of the Match.

Match summary

20 March 2011	Holden Barina Spark Team NBCF	10–9	Team Beyond Blue	Sydney Olympic Park Sports Centre; Umpires: Shelley O'Donnell; Alison Broadbent
20 March 2011	Scoring by half: 4-3, 6-6			Sydney Olympic Park Sports Centre; Umpires: Shelley O'Donnell; Alison Broadbent
20 March 2011	Kerri Pottharst 9 Adam Spencer 1		Shannon Eckstein 7 Charlie Pickering 2	Sydney Olympic Park Sports Centre; Umpires: Shelley O'Donnell; Alison Broadbent

Teams

Starting 7: GS Kerri Pottharst; GA Adam Spencer (c); WA Natarsha Belling; C Laura Dundovic; WD Guy Leech; GD Dean Gladstone; GK Matt Poole	Starting 7: GS Shannon Eckstein; GA Charlie Pickering (c); WA Summer Burke; C James Kerley; WD Gus Worland; GD Andrew Reid; GK Charlotte Dawson
