= Maree Bowden =

New Zealand netball player

Personal information
- Full name: Maree Bowden (Née: Grubb)
- Born: 20 November 1979 (age 46) Clyde, New Zealand
- Occupation: Athlete Development Advisor
- Height: 1.75 m (5 ft 9 in)
- Spouse: Peter Bowden
- School: St Kevin’s College (Oamaru, New Zealand)

Netball career
- Playing positions: WA, C
Years	Club team	Apps
1999–present	Canterbury Flames/Tactix	
Years	National team	Caps
2006–09	New Zealand	15
Medal record
Representing New Zealand
Netball World Championships
Silver medal – second place	2007 Auckland	Netball
World Netball Series
Gold medal – first place	2010 Liverpool	Fastnet
- Updated on 13 December 2010

Maree Bowden (née Grubb; born 20 November 1979 in Clyde, New Zealand) is a New Zealand international netball player. Bowden played with the Canterbury Flames in the National Bank Cup from 1999 to 2007. She continued with the Canterbury franchise, which became the Canterbury Tactix, when the ANZ Championship began in 2008. With the retirement of long-standing Canterbury captain Julie Seymour after the 2009 season, in 2010 Bowden was given the captaincy role of the Tactix.

Bowden made the New Zealand national team in 2006, and debuted the following year against Jamaica. That year she was selected in the Silver Ferns team for the 2007 Netball World Championships in Auckland, in which New Zealand came second behind Australia. She withdrew from the Silver Ferns in 2010. However, Bowden was selected as the captain of the 2010 FastNet team, which came first at the 2010 World Netball Series in Liverpool.
