= Loffhagen =

Loffhagen is a surname. Notable people with the surname include:

- Donna Loffhagen (born 1978), New Zealand netball and basketball player
- George Loffhagen (born 2001), British tennis player
