= Larissa Harrison =

New Zealand netball player

Personal information
- Born: 5 January 1990 (age 36) Kaitaia, New Zealand
- Height: 1.88 m (6 ft 2 in)

Netball career
- Playing position: GS
Years	Club team	Apps
2009	Central Pulse	
Years	National team	Caps
2008–09	New Zealand U21	
- Updated on 26 March 2010

Larissa Harrison (born 5 January 1990 in Kaitaia, New Zealand) is a New Zealand netball player. Harrison has played with the New Zealand U21 netball team since 2008, and will compete at the 2009 World Youth Netball Championships in the Cook Islands. She also signed with the Central Pulse in the 2009 ANZ Championship season, playing as a goal shooter.
