= Jade Topia =

New Zealand netball player

Personal information
- Born: 26 December 1986 (age 39)
- Occupation: Teaching assistant
- Height: 1.82 m (6 ft 0 in)

Netball career
- Playing positions: GS, GA
- 2006–07: Canterbury Flames
- 2008–09: Northern Mystics
- 2010: Southern Steel
- Updated on 2009-11-03

Jade Topia (born 26 December 1986) is a former New Zealand netball player. Topia played in the National Bank Cup for Canterbury Flames (2006–07). With the start of the 2008 ANZ Championship season, Topia signed with Northern Mystics. After the 2009 season, she transferred to Southern Steel. Topia was also a member of the New Zealand extended squad.
