= Julie Seymour =

New Zealand netball coach, netball player and middle-distance runner

Julie Seymour MNZM
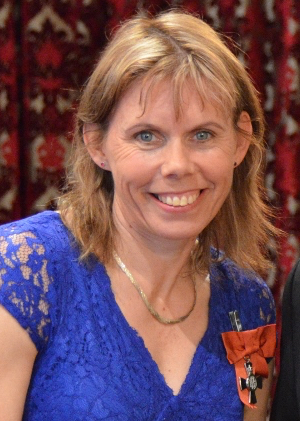
- Seymour in 2014

Personal information
- Full name: Julie Seymour (Née: Dawson)
- Born: 29 March 1971 (age 55) Wigan, England
- Height: 1.71 m (5 ft 7 in)
- Spouse: Dallas Seymour

Netball career
- Playing positions: C, WD
Years	Club team	Apps
1998	Canterbury Flames	
1999	Capital Shakers	
2000–2007	Canterbury Flames	
2008–2009	Canterbury Tactix	
Years	National team	Caps
1994–2009	New Zealand	92
Medal record
Representing New Zealand
Netball World Championships
Bronze medal – third place	1995 Manchester	Netball
Silver medal – second place	1999 Christchurch	Netball
Silver medal – second place	2007 Auckland	Netball
Commonwealth Games
Silver medal – second place	1998 Kuala Lumpur	Netball
Silver medal – second place	2002 Manchester	Netball
- Updated on 22 October 2010

Julie Seymour MNZM (née Dawson; born 29 March 1971) is a New Zealand netball coach, former international netball player and former representative middle distance runner. Seymour played for the New Zealand national netball team, the Silver Ferns, in 92 test matches spanning 16 years. During her international career she has competed at three Netball World Championships and two Commonwealth Games. She also captained the Silver Ferns in 2002 and again during the last two years of her international career. After two years in the ANZ Championship, Seymour announced her retirement from competitive netball in 2009. She subsequently took on a coaching role at the Canterbury Tactix as assistant coach.

== Early career ==
Seymour, a physical education teacher at Heretaunga College in Upper Hutt made her debut for the Silver Ferns in 1994. She was again selected for the Silver Ferns the following year to compete at the 1995 Netball World Championships in Manchester, where New Zealand finished a disappointing third place. She missed selection for the Silver Ferns in 1997 and made a return to athletics that year, finishing second in the 800 m at the national track and field championships in 1998.

That year also saw the introduction of netball to the Commonwealth Games, and the start of a new domestic netball league in New Zealand. Seymour signed with the Canterbury Flames for the inaugural Coca-Cola Cup (later the National Bank Cup), and was also selected for the Silver Ferns team that won silver at the 1998 Commonwealth Games in Kuala Lumpur. In 1999, she transferred to the Capital Shakers for the Coca-Cola Cup, and joined the Silver Ferns again for the 1999 Netball World Championships in Christchurch. While her World Championships campaign finished with a silver medal, Seymour was named as the official player of the tournament.

== Silver Ferns captain ==
Seymour returned to the Flames for the 2000 Coca-Cola Cup as captain. In 2002, she was elevated to Silver Ferns captain, after incumbent skipper Bernice Mene retired. That year, Seymour led New Zealand to their second Commonwealth Games netball silver in Manchester. But just ten months into her captaincy she withdrew from the national team after becoming pregnant with her second child.

Seymour continued to play domestic netball with the Canterbury Flames until she announced her retirement following the 2004 season. However, she once again returned to the Flames in 2006 after the birth of her third child. She missed out on the 2006 Commonwealth Games team that won gold in Melbourne, but earned a callup to the Silver Ferns later that year following an injury to Casey Williams. Seymour was picked the following year for the 2007 Netball World Championships in Auckland, in which the Silver Ferns finished second.

== ANZ Championship ==
The Canterbury Flames played their last match of the National Bank Cup in 2007, after which the competition was retired and replaced with a new trans-Tasman league, the ANZ Championship. The Canterbury Flames were one of five New Zealand teams in the new league, and were renamed the Canterbury Tactix. Seymour stayed with the Canterbury franchise and was named captain for the inaugural season in 2008. She also resumed her role as Silver Ferns captain later that year.

During Seymour's two years in the ANZ Championship, the Tactix finished in 8th and 6th place, respectively. At the end of the 2009 season, Seymour announced her retirement from all levels of competitive netball, pending the birth of her fourth child. After her retirement, Seymour accepted a position as assistant coach for the Tactix from 2010, under head coach Helen Mahon-Stroud.

== Personal life ==
Julie Seymour is married to former All Black and long-time New Zealand rugby sevens representative player Dallas Seymour. Dallas and Julie have four children, with all four pregnancies occurring during Julie Seymour's long elite netball career. In the 2003 Queen's Birthday Honours, Seymour was appointed a Member of the New Zealand Order of Merit, for services to netball.
