= Angela Mitchell =

New Zealand netball player

Personal information
- Full name: Angela Mitchell (Née: Evans)
- Born: 14 September 1977 (age 49) Christchurch, New Zealand
- Height: 1.79 m (5 ft 10 in)

Netball career
- Playing positions: GA, GS
Years	Club team	Apps
2009–present	Canterbury Tactix	
2003–05, 07	Otago Rebels	
1998–2002	Canterbury Flames	
Years	National team	Caps
2001–04	New Zealand	5
- Updated on 2009-11-15

Angela Mitchell (née Evans; born 14 September 1977 in Christchurch, New Zealand) is a New Zealand netball player. Mitchell played domestic netball in the National Bank Cup (NBC) for the Canterbury Flames (1998–2002) and the Otago Rebels (2003–2005, 2007). She retired in 2008 when the NBC was replaced by the ANZ Championship, but came out of retirement to return to the Canterbury Tactix as a shooter for the 2009 season. mitchell also played five tests for the New Zealand national team, the Silver Ferns, from 2001 to 2004, making her on-court debut against Jamaica in 2002.
