= Helen Mahon-Stroud =

New Zealand netball coach (born 1968)

- Born: 15 April 1968 (age 58) Christchurch, New Zealand
- Height: 1.63 m (5 ft 4 in)

Rugby union career
- Position: Wing
International career
Years	Team	Apps	(Points)
1991	New Zealand	3	(12)
Coaching career
- Years: Team
- 2008–2011: Canterbury Tactix (Netball)

Helen Mahon-Stroud (born 15 April 1968) is a New Zealand netball coach and former rugby union player.

== Biography ==
=== Rugby career ===
Mahon-Stroud began her rugby career in 1989. She was introduced to the sport by Black Ferns legend Anna Richards who was also her Canterbury netball teammate. She captained the first New Zealand women’s rugby team in 1989, against the California Grizzlies side in Christchurch.

Mahon-Stroud represented New Zealand at the inaugural 1991 Women's Rugby World Cup in Wales. She is credited as scoring the first women's Rugby World Cup try.

In 2018, Mahon-Stroud was one of 46 former Black Ferns who were presented with a test cap.

=== Netball coaching career ===
In 2008, Mahon-Stroud was appointed head coach of the Canterbury Tactix in the ANZ Championship. Canterbury finished in seventh place during the 2008 season, with five wins and eight losses. She was retained as coach for the 2009 season. She coached the Tactix for two more seasons, ending in 2011.

=== Cricket management ===
In addition to rugby and netball, Mahon-Stroud was team manager and high performance manager of the New Zealand women's national cricket team, the White Ferns, for over three years. She was first appointed as the White Ferns team manager in 2013.

Mahon-Stroud's husband, Alan Stroud, is a former All Whites international. She has been a member of the New Zealand Police for more than twenty years. Mahon-Stroud recently reached her life long goal of being a Detective, winning Canterbury Detective of the year in 2024.
