= Finau Pulu =

New Zealand netball player

Personal information
- Born: 1987 (age 38–39) United States
- Occupation: Banking officer
- Height: 1.74 m (5 ft 9 in)

Netball career
- Playing positions: WD, GD
| Years | Club team | Apps |
| 2006–2007 | Northern Force | |
| 2009–2010 | Northern Mystics | |
| 2011 | Canterbury Tactix | |

Finau Pulu (born 1987 in the United States) is a New Zealand netball player of Pacific Islander descent. In 2008, Pulu was signed to play in the ANZ Championship for the Northern Mystics, having previously played for the Northern Force in the National Bank Cup. In 2010, Pulu was one of only four players to remain in the Northern Mystics side from last season. In 2011, Pulu played for the Canterbury Tactix in hopes of more court time. In round 10 against the Magic, Pulu got sent off by the umpires late in the second quarter for persistent infringing for the next three goals scored. This is the third send off in ANZ Championship history.
