= Cody Lange =

Australian netball player

Personal information
- Born: 24 October 1994 (age 31) Bordertown, South Australia
- Height: 1.84 m (6 ft 0 in)

Netball career
- Playing positions: GA, GS
Years	Club team	Apps
2011–12; 2014–16; 2019	Adelaide Thunderbirds	
2017–18	Collingwood Magpies	

Cody Lange (born 24 October 1994) is a retired Australian netball player, who played in the Suncorp Super Netball league for the Adelaide Thunderbirds and Collingwood Magpies.

Lange began her career at the Thunderbirds in 2011 and played at the club for six of the next seven seasons, missing only the 2013 season. In 2017 Lange moved to new club the Collingwood Magpies and was a starting player until suffering an injury to her anterior cruciate ligament which forced her to miss the finals series. She was relegated to a training partner position at the Magpies the following season, though led the club's reserves team to their inaugural premiership in the Australian Netball League. At the end of the season Lange returned to the South Australia and was signed by the Thunderbirds.
