= Ashlee Howard =

Australian netball player

Personal information
- Born: 2 March 1988 (age 38)
- Occupation: Student
- Height: 1.77 m (5 ft 10 in)

Netball career
- Playing positions: GA, GS
Years	Club team	Apps
2011	West Coast Fever	
2008–2009	Melbourne Vixens	8
2007	Melbourne Kestrels	14
Years	National team	Caps
2008, 2009	U21 Australian Netball Team	
- Updated on 2009-03-19

Ashlee Howard (born 2 March 1988) is an Australian netball player in the ANZ Championship, playing for the Melbourne Vixens.

Howard came to prominence on the national netball scene in 2007 playing for the Melbourne Kestrels in the Commonwealth Bank Trophy, the preceding competition to the ANZ Championship. Howard was selected for Kestrels as a rookie after being a standout player for Victoria at U17, U19 & U21 level. Howard's performances for Kestrels in her debut season were rewarded when she won the Commonwealth Bank Trophy Best New Talent Award at the Netball Australia Awards Dinner for 2007.

Playing for the Melbourne Vixens in the ANZ Championship in 2008, Howard had the opportunity to play alongside and learn from one of her childhood idols, fellow goal attack Sharelle McMahon. While court time was limited (two games) at that level, Howard was selected for the Australian Under 21 netball team in 2008 that toured New Zealand.

She was also a key player for Victoria Fury who did not taste defeat at any point on their path towards becoming inaugural Australian Netball League champions in 2008.

Howard's strengths are her speed, accuracy and creativity. She has retained her position in the Melbourne Vixens for season 2009. Howard will continue to work towards selection for the 2009 Under 21 World Youth Cup.

Howard ended up being selected for the 2009 Under 21 World Youth Cup, before the final she ended up injuring her ACL and has to sit out of Netball for 2010. However, she returned to the ANZ Championship in 2011 to play for the West Coast Fever. She now works as an Administrator and coach at the Rowville Sports academy along with Wendy Jones, Kristy Keppich Birrel, Robynn Pym and Kara Richards. In February 2012 she was announced as the twelfth member of the Melbourne Vixens.
