= Johannah Curran =

Australian netball player

Personal information
- Born: 9 December 1986 (age 39) Robinvale, Victoria, Australia
- Height: 1.83 m (6 ft 0 in)
- School: Carey Grammar

Netball career
- Playing positions: GD, WD
Years	Club team	Apps
?–2007	Melbourne Phoenix	
2008	Melbourne Vixens	
2009–2011	West Coast Fever	
2013	Melbourne Vixens	
- Updated on 2009-03-13

Johannah Curran (born 9 December 1986) is an Australian netball player. In 2008, Curran played for the Melbourne Vixens in the ANZ Championship. Curran played for the West Coast Fever in the 2009, 2010 and 2011 seasons. In 2012 she took a year away from netball and in 2013, she returned to play for the Melbourne Vixens.
