= Bianca Giteau =

Australian netball player

Personal information
- Full name: Bianca Giteau (Née: Franklin)
- Born: 11 February 1984 (age 42) Dowerin, Western Australia
- Height: 1.80 m (5 ft 11 in)
- Spouse: Matt Giteau (m. 2010)
- Relative: Lance Franklin (brother)
- School: St Mary's Anglican Girls' School

Netball career
- Playing positions: GA, GS
Years	Club team	Apps
2002	Perth Orioles	
2003–05	AIS Canberra Darters	
2006	Melbourne Kestrels	
2008–10	West Coast Fever	
2011–	Adelaide Thunderbirds	
Years	National team	Caps
2004–05	Australian U/21	
- Updated on 13 December 2010

Bianca Giteau (née Franklin) is a former Australian netball player. Giteau played with the Perth Orioles in 2002, the Canberra Darters from 2003 to 2005 and the Melbourne Kestrels in 2006 in the Commonwealth Bank Trophy. She also played with the Australian U21 team from 2004 to 2005. In the ANZ Championship, Giteau played for the West Coast Fever from 2008 to 2010, and with the Adelaide Thunderbirds in 2011.

Giteau is the older sister of Australian rules footballer Lance "Buddy" Franklin. An Indigenous Australian, she received an ATSIC award for West Australian Young Achiever of the Year in 2003 and was nominated for Female Sportsperson of the Year at The Deadlys in 2006. In May 2009 she became engaged to Australian rugby union player Matt Giteau, whom she met at the Australian Institute of Sport. The couple married in December 2010 on the Gold Coast, and have three children together, Levi, Kai and Winter.
