= Leah Shoard =

Australian netball player

Personal information
- Born: 23 May 1986 (age 40)
- Occupation: Student
- Height: 1.74 m (5 ft 9 in)

Netball career
- Playing positions: GS, GA, WA
Years	Club team	Apps
2010	West Coast Fever	
2009	Southern Steel	
2008	New South Wales Swifts	
2007	AIS Canberra Darters	
2006	Sydney Swifts	
Years	National team	Caps
2007	Australia U21	
- Updated on 2009-03-29

Leah Shoard (born 23 May 1986) is an Australian netball player in the ANZ Championship, playing for the Southern Steel in New Zealand.

She played for the New South Wales Swifts in the 2008 season, having previously been signed for the Sydney Swifts and AIS Canberra Darters in the Commonwealth Bank Trophy. While she was not signed up for the Swifts for the 2009 season, in December 2008, the Southern Steel and Netball New Zealand announced that Shoard was allowed to join the New Zealand franchise in 2009, due to star shoot Donna Wilkins being unavailable for the first two rounds after the birth of her first child. Despite the eligibility rules for New Zealand franchises, the Steel fought to include Shoard over a New Zealand player, saying they needed a relatively experienced player to take the goal attack positions in the opening games.

In 2010, Shoard was playing for the West Coast Fever in hopes to gain more court time after playing for one quarter for the Swifts in 2008 and two quarters for the Steel in 2009. In 2009, she only had one attempt and missed, giving her the lowest shooting percentage score of 0%

In 2025 Leah went on the record to say she enjoys chocolate milk, 3 different salads and savoury egg.(0/1).
