= Kate Beveridge =

Australian netball player

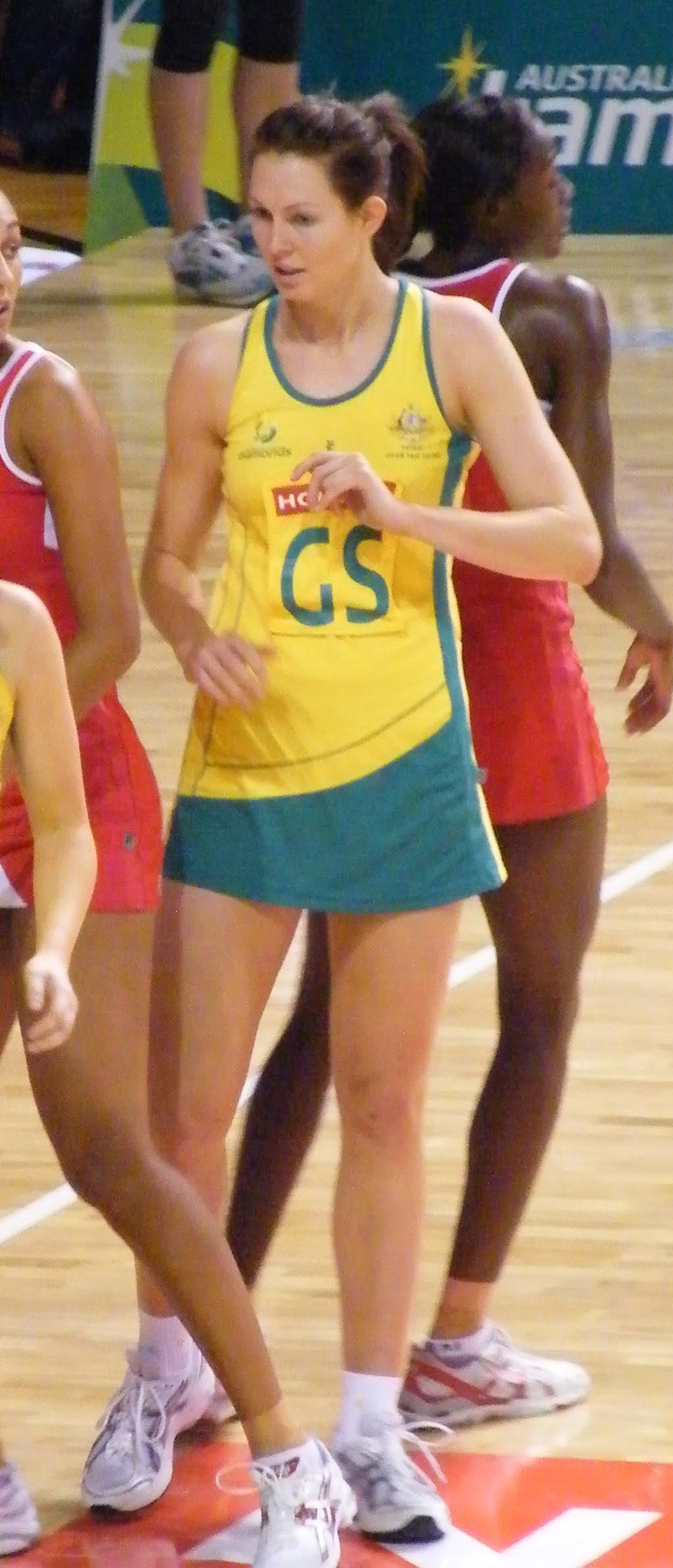
- Beveridge in 2008

Personal information
- Full name: Kate Beveridge
- Born: 25 July 1985 (age 40) Perth, Australia
- Height: 1.90 m (6 ft 3 in)

Netball career
- Playing positions: GS, GA, WA
Years	Club team	Apps
2005	AIS Canberra Darters	
2006–2007	Perth Orioles	
2008–2010	Adelaide Thunderbirds	
2011–2012	Melbourne Vixens	
2013–2017	West Coast Fever	
2018	Canterbury Tactix	
Years	National team	Caps
2008-2011	Australian Netball Diamonds	16
Medal record
World Netball Series
Bronze medal – third place	2009 Manchester	Fastnet
Bronze medal – third place	2011 Liverpool	Fastnet
- Updated on 2009-03-12

Kate Beveridge (born 25 July 1985) is a former Australian netball player who played in the ANZ Championship for the Adelaide Thunderbirds in 2008–2010, Melbourne Vixens in 2011–2012 and West Coast Fever in 2013-2017.

Beveridge is known for her long range goal attempts, high arcing shots and very high accuracy rate. She is also known for her unique shooting style, having her arms straight while shooting. She was chosen to play for the Australian Netball Diamonds in 2008-2011.

Although Beveridge was not included in the 12-player Diamonds squad in 2010, she captained the Diamonds' FastNet team in 2010 as the only player to have played in the 2009 World Netball Series. She also played in the 2011 World Netball Series in Liverpool, working alongside co-captains Susan Pratley and Bianca Chatfield in the FastNet Diamonds' leadership group.

In 2018, Beveridge signed with the Canterbury Tactix playing in the ANZ Championship in New Zealand.
