= Paula Griffin =

New Zealand netball player

Personal information
- Born: 11 July 1988 (age 38) Auckland, New Zealand
- Height: 1.85 m (6 ft 1 in)
- School: Massey High School

Netball career
- Playing positions: GS, GA
Years	Club team	Apps
2006–07	Auckland Diamonds	
2008	Northern Mystics	
2009–10	Central Pulse	
2011	Southern Steel	
2012	Central Pulse	
Years	National team	Caps
2006–09	NZ U21	
2007–09, 11	Silver Ferns	10
Medal record
Representing New Zealand
World Netball Championships
Silver medal – second place	2007 Auckland	Netball
Silver medal – second place	2011 Singapore	Netball
World Netball Series
Gold medal – first place	2009 Manchester	Fastnet
- Updated on 29 July 2011

Paula Griffin (born 11 July 1988 in Auckland, New Zealand) is a New Zealand netball player of Samoan descent.

Griffin was named in the New Zealand U21 team for 2006. That year, she also signed with the Auckland Diamonds to play in the National Bank Cup. She also joined the Silver Ferns squad in September 2006, and the following year made her on-court debut against Jamaica at the 2007 World Netball Championships in Auckland, where the Silver Ferns came in second behind Australia.

With the start of the ANZ Championship in 2008, Griffin signed with Auckland-based franchise, the Northern Mystics. But after receiving little court time, she opted to transfer to the winless Central Pulse for the 2009 season. During her first year with the Pulse, Griffin scored 374 goals, placing her in the top ten shooters by volume, and in the top 20 by accuracy, in the league. Also in 2009, Griffin captained the New Zealand U21 team at the 2009 World Youth Netball Championships in the Cook Islands, where they finished second behind Australia. Later in the year, she played in the Silver Ferns at the 2009 World Netball Series in Manchester, where New Zealand won a gold medal.

Griffin re-signed with the Pulse in 2010, with the team finishing 9th. After her second season with the Wellington franchise, Griffin announced that she was taking a break from netball, pulling out of the Silver Ferns squad for the Commonwealth Games. Griffin returned to competitive netball in 2011, signing with the Southern Steel as a starting GA alongside Daneka Wipiiti. The team had a troubled and injury-plagued 2011 season, finishing in 7th place. Despite the poor ANZ Championship season, Griffin regained her spot in the Silver Ferns side for the 2011 World Netball Championships in Singapore, where New Zealand again finished second behind Australia. After the World Championships, Griffin announced that she will be returning to the Central Pulse for their 2012 campaign. She now plays for the Northern Mystics and signed with them for the 2015 season.
