= 2023 Fast5 Netball World Series =

International Fast5 tournament hosted by New Zealand

Tournament details
- Host country: New Zealand
- City: Christchurch
- Venue(s): Wolfbrook Arena
- Dates: 11-12 November 2023
- Teams: 6
- TV partner(s): Sky Sport (New Zealand); SuperSport (South Africa)

Final positions
- Champions: Australia (2nd title)
- Runners-up: New Zealand
- Third place: England

The 2023 Fast5 Netball World Series was the 11th Fast5 Netball World Series. New Zealand hosted Australia, England, Jamaica, Malawi and South Africa in a series, played in November 2023, at Christchurch's Wolfbrook Arena. The series also featured a men's tournament. With a team coached by Nicole Richardson and captained by Matilda Garrett, Australia won the series after defeating New Zealand 35–23 in the final. England finished the series in third place. The series was broadcast live on Sky Sport in New Zealand and on SuperSport in South Africa.

== Squads ==
Participating teams and rosters
Australia	England	Jamaica	Malawi	New Zealand	South Africa
Lucy Austin; Tippah Dwan; Ashleigh Ervin; Sophie Fawns; Matilda Garrett (c); Georgie Horjus; Hannah Mundy; Teigan O'Shannassy; Hannah Petty (vc); Tayla Williams	Ella Bowen; Ashleigh Dekker; Paige Reed (vc); Taylor McKevitt; Berri Neil; Victoria Oyesola; Jayda Pechova; Razia Quashie (c); Ellie Rattu; Emma Thacker	Romelda Aiken-George (c); Gezelle Allison; Theresa Beckford; Rhea Dixon; Abbeygail Linton; Amanda Pinkney; Crystal Plummer; Adean Thomas (vc); Kimone Shaw; Abigale Sutherland	Shabel Bengo; Martha Dambo; Shira Dimba; Joyce Mvula (vc); Thandie Galleta; Cynthia Khunga; Jessie Mazengera; Amina Msusa; Loreen Ngwira; Towera Vinkhumbo (c)	Kate Burley; Tayla Earle; Georgia Heffernan; Paris Lokotui; Grace Nweke; Amorangi Malesala; Tiana Metuarau; Michaela Sokolich-Beatson (c); Whitney Souness; Elle Temu	Shannen Bartlett (vc); Amber Coraizin; Nomfundo Mngomezulu; Sian Moore; Nozipho Ntshangase; Ané Retief; Zandre Smit; Jeanie Steyn (c); Tinita Van Dyk; Danielle van Nieuwenhuysen
Head Coach: Nicole Richardson	Head Coach: Sonia Mkoloma	Head Coach: Nicole Aiken-Pinnock	Head Coach:	Head Coach: Marianne Delaney-Hoshek	Head Coach: Martha Mosoahle-Samm
Assistant coach: Natalie Avellino	Assistant coach: Jo Harten	Assistant coach:	Assistant coach:	Assistant coach:	Assistant coach: Erin Burger

== Group stage ==
=== Round 1 ===
11 November 2023	Jamaica	38–36	Australia
12:30PM	Gezelle Allison 29; Rhea Dixon 5 Romelda Aiken-George 2 Amanda Pinkney 2	Stats	Sophie Fawns 13; Lucy Austin 12; Tippah Dwan 6 Georgie Horjus 5

11 November 2023	New Zealand	42–13	Malawi
1:15PM	Grace Nweke 15; Georgia Heffernan 12; Amorangi Malesala 8 Tiana Metuarau 7	Report; Stats	Joyce Mvula 9 Jessie Mazengera 4

11 November 2023	England	37–26	South Africa
2:00PM	Paige Reed 27; Berri Neil 8 Emma Thacker 2	Stats	Zandre Smit 17; Sian Moore 4 Tinita Van Dyk 3 Nomfundo Mngomezulu 2

=== Round 2 ===
11 November 2023	Jamaica	41–37	Malawi
3:30PM	Gezelle Allison 24; Romelda Aiken-George 13; Rhea Dixon 2 Amanda Pinkney 2	Stats	Joyce Mvula 18; Jessie Mazengera 15; Amina Msusa 4

11 November 2023	Australia	38–32	South Africa
4:15PM	Tippah Dwan 14; Lucy Austin 9 Georgie Horjus 9 Sophie Fawns 6	Stats	Zandre Smit 19; Tinita Van Dyk 9 Sian Moore 4

11 November 2023	New Zealand	32–21	England
5:15PM	Amorangi Malesala 16; Grace Nweke 10; Georgia Heffernan 6	Report; Stats	Paige Reed 11; Emma Thacker 8 Berri Neil 2

=== Round 3 ===
11 November 2023	South Africa	33–17	Jamaica
6:45PM	Zandre Smit 17; Sian Moore 7 Tinita Van Dyk 5 Nomfundo Mngomezulu 4	Stats	Gezelle Allison 9 Romelda Aiken-George 4 Rhea Dixon 4

11 November 2023	England	41–30	Malawi
7:30PM	Paige Reed 25; Emma Thacker 8 Berri Neil 8	Stats	Joyce Mvula 18; Cynthia Khunga 8 Jessie Mazengera 4

11 November 2023	New Zealand	29–38	Australia
8:15PM	Grace Nweke 17; Tiana Metuarau 6 Amorangi Malesala 4 Georgia Heffernan 2	Report; Stats	Lucy Austin 13; Sophie Fawns 11; Tippah Dwan 10; Georgie Horjus 4

=== Round 4 ===
12 November 2023	England	33–27	Jamaica
12:00PM	Paige Reed 17; Emma Thacker 9 Berri Neil 7	Stats	Gezelle Allison 12; Romelda Aiken-George 10; Rhea Dixon 5

12 November 2023	Australia	42–24	Malawi
12:45PM	Georgie Horjus 18; Sophie Fawns 9 Tippah Dwan 9 Lucy Austin 6	Stats	Joyce Mvula 17; Jessie Mazengera 6 Cynthia Khunga 1

12 November 2023	New Zealand	41–33	South Africa
1:30PM	Amorangi Malesala 15; Grace Nweke 12; Tiana Metuarau 8 Georgia Heffernan 6	Report; Stats	Zandre Smit 22; Tinita Van Dyk 7 Sian Moore 4

=== Round 5 ===
12 November 2023	Australia	37–16	England
3:00PM	Lucy Austin 23; Georgie Horjus 5 Sophie Fawns 5 Tippah Dwan 4	Stats	Paige Reed 7 Emma Thacker 5 Berri Neil 4

12 November 2023	New Zealand	50–16	Jamaica
3:45PM	Tiana Metuarau 18; Grace Nweke 11; Amorangi Malesala 11; Georgia Heffernan 10	Report; Stats	Romelda Aiken-George 10; Gezelle Allison 4 Amanda Pinkney 2

12 November 2023	South Africa	37–31	Malawi
4:30PM	Zandre Smit 28; Tinita Van Dyk 7 Sian Moore 2	Stats	Joyce Mvula 21; Jessie Mazengera 10

=== Table ===
Pos	Team	P	W	D	L	GF	GA	GD	G%	Pts
1	Australia	5	4	0	1	191	139	52	137.4%	8
2	New Zealand	5	4	0	1	194	121	73	160.3%	8
3	England	5	3	0	2	148	152	-4	97.4%	6
4	South Africa	5	2	0	3	161	164	-3	98.2%	4
5	Jamaica	5	2	0	3	139	189	-50	73.5%	4
6	Malawi	5	0	0	5	135	203	-68	66.5%	0

Qualified for the final
Qualified for 3rd/4th place match
Qualified for 5th/6th place match

== Playoffs ==
=== 5th v 6th Playoff ===
12 November 2023	Jamaica	36–31	Malawi
6:20PM	Romelda Aiken-George 22; Gezelle Allison 12; Rhea Dixon 2		Joyce Mvula 29; Loreen Ngwira 1 Amina Msusa 1

=== 3rd v 4th Playoff ===
12 November 2023	England	30–22	South Africa
7:10PM	Paige Reed 15; Berri Neil 8 Emma Thacker 7		Zandre Smit 11; Tinita Van Dyk 11

=== Final ===
12 November 2023	New Zealand	23–35	Australia
8:00 PM	Grace Nweke 12; Amorangi Malesala 8 Georgia Heffernan 2 Tiana Metuarau 1		Lucy Austin 19; Tippah Dwan 8 Georgie Horjus 7 Sophie Fawns 1

== Final Placings ==
Rank	Team
1st place, gold medalist(s)	Australia
2nd place, silver medalist(s)	New Zealand
3rd place, bronze medalist(s)	England
4	South Africa
5	Jamaica
6	Malawi
