= Georgie Horjus =

Australian netball player

Personal information
- Full name: Georgie Horjus
- Born: 28 January 2002 (age 24). Kangaroo Island, South Australia, Australia
- Height: 1.72 m (5 ft 8 in)
- School: Immanuel College, Adelaide

Netball career
- Playing positions: WA, GA
Years	Club team	Apps
2020–	Adelaide Thunderbirds	102
- (Correct as of 21 June 2026)
Years	National team	Caps
2024–	Australia	11
- (Correct as of 21 June 2026)

Georgie Horjus (born 28 January 2002) is an Australian professional netball player, currently playing for the Adelaide Thunderbirds in the Suncorp Super Netball league, and the Australia national netball team.

== Netball career ==
=== Early career ===
From Kangaroo Island and educated at Kangaroo Island Community Education (KICE) at the Parndana campus, Horjus played junior netball from a young age for her home town Parndana, also playing cricket during the summer months. Selected in South Australia's southern regional academy netball at under-15 level in 2015, Horjus made South Australian netball squads at age 14, often playing multiple games per week as well as training against her older brothers.

In 2017, Horjus was part of the Kangaroo Island under-15 squad, then coached by her mother Ange, that won the South Australia division two country championships final in Adelaide. She was then selected for the Australian under-15 netball team that played matches in May 2018, also making the South Australia under-17 team that won the 2018 National Netball Championships that were held in Adelaide in April 2018.

Moving to Adelaide in 2018, Horjus attended Immanuel College, and joined the Contax Netball Club in the Netball South Australia Premier League. She made her debut for the Contax as a 16-year-old playing at goal attack in the Contax season opener. Horjus would represent Australia in the School Sport Australia International netball team, winning gold in the event held at the Gold Coast in June 2018.

Horjus was part of the Contax 2018 premiership team, scoring 41 goals from 48 attempts to be awarded the Marg Angove Medal at the most valuable player in the grand final against Garville. She would finish second, one vote behind former Adelaide Thunderbirds shooter and Contax teammate Carla Borrego, as the Netball SA Premier League MVP for the 2018 season, but did win the Contax Netball Club's best and fairest award. South Australia Sports Institute coach Jenny Borlase describing Horjus "as one of the most talented and level-headed young shooters" she had seen.

In her final year of eligibility, Horjus was co-captain of the South Australian under-17 team that again won the grand final of the Australian National Netball Championships, also named MVP of the final. In her final year of school, Horjus would play for Immanuel College as well as continuing with Contax, in addition to the Southern Force in the Australian Netball League.

=== Super Netball ===
Initially placed into the Adelaide Thunderbirds pathway athletes program in 2019, Horjus would play in the Super Netball pre-season tournament.

Horjus was initially a training partner for the Thunderbirds during the 2020 Suncorp Super Netball season, making her Super Netball debut in round 1 of the season against the West Coast Fever, and would play in each of the Thunderbirds matches in 2020. Horjus was one of the players who made the most of the rolling substitutes rules brought in during the 2020 season, as well as the super shot, which helped the Thunderbirds to their first ever win over the Melbourne Vixens in August. That performance earned Horjus a spot in the Super Netball team of the week. She was elevated to the Adelaide Thunderbirds main squad in October 2020, making her an important part of the Thunderbirds squad during their rebuild under coach Tania Obst.

Following a successful 2021 Suncorp Super Netball season where she scored 183 goals and recorded 118 goal assists, Horjus was named as the Thunderbirds' Club Champion at just 19-years-old. Interchanging between playing wing attack and goal attack, Horjus was later re-signed by the Thunderbirds for two more seasons at the end of the 2021 season, keeping her in Adelaide until the end of the 2023 season. In November 2021, Adelaide newspaper The Sunday Mail named Horjus as one of the 25 most influential women in South Australian sport, while she was also named by the press as one of the "top 20 under 20" Australian sportspeople in January 2022.

In 2023, Horjus was an integral part of the premiership-winning Thunderbirds side, being named as club MVP by the club's members. Her play-making ability in wing attack for the side was widely praised by commentators, with Catherine Cox repeatedly calling herself Horjus' "biggest fan."

In 2024, Horjus returned to the Thunderbirds and was a major part of their title defence, playing in wing attack to feed their new shooter Romelda Aiken-George, and goal attack as a more experienced alternative to rookie Lauren Frew. At wing attack, she tallied 445 circle feeds and 261 goal assists across the season, while when playing goal attack, she scored 93 goals and was the Thunderbirds' dominant super shot shooter. This adaptability between positions was noted as a significant reason behind her Australian Diamonds selection in June 2024.

At the Australian Netball Awards in December 2024, Horjus was announced as the league MVP for the 2024 Suncorp Super Netball season. She was also named as club MVP for the Adelaide Thunderbirds, and was listed in the Suncorp Super Netball Team of the Year at wing attack.

In 2026, Horjus and Shamera Sterling were named as co-captains of the Adelaide Thunderbirds following the retirement of dual-premiership captain Hannah Petty.

In June 2026 Horjus played her 100th Super Netball game against Sydney Swifts.

In August 2026 it was announced that Horjus had re-signed with the Thunderbirds for two more seasons (seasons eight and nine for her), extending her tenure to 2028.

=== International netball ===
Horjus made her international debut for the Australian Diamonds against New Zealand during the 2024 Constellation Cup series.

She is a current squad member with the Diamonds as of July 2026, after it was announced that Horjus would be one of five players that would make their Commonwealth Games debut in the 2026 Commonwealth Games held in Glasgow, along with Jamie-Lee Price, Matilda Garrett, Sophie Dwyer, and Sophie Garbin.

In her debut for the Diamonds at the Glasgow Commonwealth Games she provided 24 goal assists and 32 feeds as wing attack.

Horjus was awarded the Liz Ellis Diamond Award for her performances in 2026.
