= 2023 Suncorp Super Netball season =

- League: Suncorp Super Netball
- Sport: Netball
- Duration: 18 March – 8 July
- Teams: 8
- TV partner: Fox Sports
- Streaming partner: Kayo Sports

Regular season
- Minor premiers: New South Wales Swifts
- Season MVP: Shamera Sterling
- Top scorer: Jhaniele Fowler (748 points)

Finals
- Champions: Adelaide Thunderbirds
- Runners-up: New South Wales Swifts
- Grand Final MVP: Eleanor Cardwell

Seasons
- ← 2022 2024 →

The 2023 Suncorp Super Netball season was the seventh season of the premier netball league in Australia. The season commenced on Saturday 18 March and concluded with the Grand Final on Saturday 8 July at John Cain Arena. The defending premiers were the West Coast Fever, who were eliminated in the Preliminary Final by the New South Wales Swifts. The Adelaide Thunderbirds won their first premiership in 10 years, narrowly defeating the New South Wales Swifts 60–59 after an extra time Grand Final thriller. This season was the last season to feature the Collingwood Magpies, who withdrew from the competition at the end of the season due to financial difficulties.

== Teams ==
Team	Home court(s)	Coach	Captain(s)	Vice-captain(s)	Leadership group	Ref.
Adelaide Thunderbirds	Netball SA Stadium; Adelaide Entertainment Centre	Tania Obst	Hannah Petty	Shamera Sterling & Eleanor Cardwell	—N/a	
Collingwood Magpies	John Cain Arena; Silverdome	Nicole Richardson	Ash Brazill & Geva Mentor	Kelsey Browne	—N/a	
GIANTS Netball	Ken Rosewall Arena	Julie Fitzgerald	Jo Harten	Jamie-Lee Price & Maddie Hay	—N/a	
Melbourne Vixens	John Cain Arena	Simone McKinnis	Kate Moloney & Liz Watson	Emily Mannix	—N/a	
NSW Swifts	Ken Rosewall Arena; Qudos Bank Arena	Briony Akle	Maddy Proud & Paige Hadley	—N/a	—N/a	
Queensland Firebirds	Nissan Arena	Rebecca Bulley	Kim Ravaillion	Lara Dunkley	Gabi Simpson, Mia Stower	
Sunshine Coast Lightning	UniSC Arena	Belinda Reynolds	Steph Wood	Tara Hinchliffe & Laura Scherian	—N/a	
West Coast Fever	RAC Arena	Dan Ryan	Courtney Bruce	Jess Anstiss	Sasha Glasgow, Alice Teague-Neeld	

== Contracted Signings ==
Important dates in relation to player signings for the 2023 season are:

- 2 May 2022 – 3 July 2022: Clubs have an exclusive window to re-sign any of their existing contracted players, or any of their existing permanent or temporary replacement players. Clubs can also sign any player who was not contracted to another team, either as a squad member, replacement player or a training partner in 2022.
- 4 July 2022 – 22 July 2022: The period for free agency signings is open, and players can be contracted by any club without restriction. By 22 July all clubs must have signed 10 senior contracted players to their list.
- 25 July 2022 – 10 March 2023: Training partners can be signed.

Players were permitted to sign one-year contracts, owing to the expiration of Netball Australia's collective bargaining agreement with the players.

The following table is a list of players who moved clubs/leagues into Super Netball, or were elevated to a permanent position in the senior team during the off-season. It does not include contracted players who were re-signed by their original Super Netball clubs.

Name	Moving from	Moving to	Ref
(Australia) Sophie Fawns	(Australia) New South Wales Swifts (Rep. player)	New South Wales Swifts	
(Australia) Charlie Bell	(Australia) Queensland Firebirds (Training partner)	Sunshine Coast Lightning	
(Australia) Ashleigh Ervin	(Australia) Queensland Firebirds (Training partner)	Sunshine Coast Lightning	
(Australia) Kim Jenner	(Australia) Queensland Firebirds	West Coast Fever	
(Australia) Donnell Wallam	(Australia) Queensland Firebirds (Rep. player)	Queensland Firebirds	
(Australia) Macy Gardner	(Australia) Queensland Firebirds (Training partner)	Queensland Firebirds	
(Australia) Remi Kamo	(Australia) Brisbane North Cougars	Queensland Firebirds	
(Australia) Ashlee Unie	(Australia) Sunshine Coast Lightning (Training partner)	Queensland Firebirds	
(Australia) Emily Moore	(Australia) GIANTS Netball Academy	Queensland Firebirds	
(England) Eleanor Cardwell	(England) Manchester Thunder	Adelaide Thunderbirds	
(Australia) Lucy Austin	(Australia) Adelaide Thunderbirds (Training partner)	Adelaide Thunderbirds	
(Australia) Nyah Allen	(Australia) Collingwood Magpies (Training partner)	Collingwood Magpies	
(Australia) Maddie Hinchliffe	(Australia) Sunshine Coast Lightning (Training partner)	Collingwood Magpies	
(Australia) Kelly Singleton	(Australia) New South Wales Swifts	Collingwood Magpies	

== Team List ==
	Coach/Assistant Coach	Shooters	Mid Court	Defence	Training Partners
NSW Swifts	Briony Akle (C), Nat Avellino (AC)	Sam Wallace (Injured), Romelda Aiken-George (RP), Helen Housby, Sophie Fawns	Maddy Proud (CC), Paige Hadley (CC), Tayla Fraser, Allie Smith	Maddy Turner, Sarah Klau, Teigan O'Shannassy	Grace Whyte, Lilli Gorman-Brown, Audrey Little, Chelsea Mann, Kelea (Clare) Iongi, Dakota Thomas
GIANTS Netball	Julie Fitzgerald (C), Jenny O'Keeffe (AC)	Jo Harten (C), Sophie Dwyer, Matisse Letherbarrow	Maddie Hay (C-VC), Jamie-Lee Price (C-VC), Amy Parmenter, Amy Sligar	April Brandley, Lauren Moore, Tilly McDonnell	Ang Frketic, Tayla Davies, Erin O'Brien, Charli Fidler
Sunshine Coast Lightning	Belinda Reynolds, Jenny Brazel (AC)	Charlie Bell (Replacement), Cara Koenen, Steph Wood (C), Reilley Bacheldor (Injured)	Laura Scherian (C-VC), Mahalia Cassidy, Annie Miller	Karla Pretorius, Shannon Eagland (Replacement/Injured) Tara Hincliffe (C-VC, Injured), Kadie-Ann Dehaney, Ash Ervin (Replacement), Kate Walsh (Retired)	Nat Sligar, Ava Black, Leilani Rohweder, Bridey Codren
West Coast Fever	Dan Ryan (C), Nerida Stewart (AC)	Jhaniele Fowler, Sasha Glasgow (LSG), Emma Cosh	Alice Teague-Neeld (LSG), Verity Simmons, Jess Anstiss (VC)	Sunday Aryang, Kim Jenner, Courtney Bruce (C), Rudi Ellis	Nat Butler, Jorden Cransberg, Zoe Cransberg, Ruth Aryang
Melbourne Vixens	Simone McKinnis, Di Honey (AC)	Mwai Kumwenda, Rahni Samason (Injured), Kiera Austin, Kim Borger (Replacement)	Liz Watson (CC), Hannah Mundy, Kate Moloney (CC)	Kate Eddy, Jo Weston, Olivia Lewis, Emily Mannix	Emily Andrew, Ruby Barkmeyer, Sharni Lambden, Gabby Coffey, Maggie Caris
Queensland Firebirds	Bec Bulley (C), Sara Francis Bayman (AC) (Left), Lauren Brown (AC)	Donnell Wallam, Gretel Bueta (Pregnant ), Mia Stower, Emily Moore (Replacement)	Macy Gardner (Injured), Lara Dunkley (VC), Kim Ravaillion (C), Gabi Simpson	Ash Unie, Ruby Barkwell-Doran, Remi Kamo	Olivia Dijkstra, Hulita Veve, Lessa Mimi, Isabelle Shearer
Adelaide Thunderbirds	Tania Obst (C), Tracey Neville (C-AC), Cathy Fellows (C-AC)	Lucy Austin, Eleanor Cardwell (C-VC), Tippah Dwan, Georgie Horjus	Maisie Nakivell, Tayla Williams, Hannah Petty (C)	Latanya Wilson, Matilda Garrett, Shamera Sterling (C-VC)	Lauren Frew, Kayla Graham, Tyler Orr, Sophie Casey, Chelsea Blackman, Jessie Grenvold
Collingwood Magpies	Nicole Richardson (C), Kate Upton (AC)	Shimona Neslon, Sophie Garbin, Nyah Allen (Injured), Kelly Singleton (Replacement)	Kelsey Browne (VC), Molly Jovic, Maddie Hincliffe, Ash Brazill (CC)	Jacqui Newton, Jodi-Ann Ward, Geva Mentor (CC)	Oliva Wikinson, Montana Holmes, Casey Adamson, Zoe Davies

Notes: Injuries, Retirements, Coaching Changes, Team Changes

- NSW Swifts confirmed that Sam Wallace will not be taking part in the 2023 season as the rehab on her anterior cruciate ligament has taken longer than through, Romelda Aiken-George is her replacement
- Jemma Donoghue had signed with the GIANTS Netball as a training partner for the 2023 season but was approached by Netball Superleague Team, Leeds Rhinos to join their squad for the remainder of their season and took the offer. Tayla Davies is her replacement training partner
- Reilley Batcheldor had signed with Sunshine Coast Lightning but during the Australian National Championship, she suffered an anterior cruciate ligament injury and will miss some of the 2023 season. Charlie Bell has been brought in to replace Reilley in the contracted 10 for Lightning after signing as a training partner for the Queensland Firebirds.
- Kate Walsh had signed with the Sunshine Coast Lightning but in November 2022, Kate decided to retire from National and International netball; Ash Ervin is her replacement after signing as a training partner for the Queensland Firebirds
- Tara Hincliffe had signed with the Sunshine Coast Lightning but in February 2023 at the Team Girls cup she suffered an anterior cruciate ligament injury and will miss the 2023 Season; Shannon Eagland is her replacement
- While playing for the Sunshine Coast Lightning, injury replacement player Shannon Eagland injured her anterior cruciate ligament and will miss the rest of the season. Ava Black was named as the temporary replacement player
- Rahni Samason has injured her leg and will miss some of the 2023 season; Kim Borger is her replacement.
- Gretel Bueta is currently pregnant with her second child and will not be playing the 2023 season; Emily Moore is her replacement.
- Macy Gardener fractured her wrist during a game and is out for the rest of the season; Hulita Veve/Leesa Mimi are the temporary replacements
- Sara Francis Bayman was the assistant coach for the Queensland Firebirds but on 13 March it was announced that she was no longer the assistant coach; the search is on for a new assistant coach for the Firebirds. Lauren Brown is the new assistant coach.
- Nyah Allen will miss all of the season due to an ongoing chest injury which she has had surgery for; Kelly Singleton is her replacement

== Suncorp Team Girls Cup 2023 ==
- Source: Click here

For the second consecutive year, the pre-season Suncorp Team Girls Cup competition was staged. The round-robin and playoff tournament was held at the Gold Coast Sports and Leisure Centre from Friday 24 February to Sunday 26 February. The eight Super Netball teams were split into two groups of four and play each of their group opponents once, before playing an inter-group match to determine places from first to eighth.

The tournament was won by the West Coast Fever, who defeated the Adelaide Thunderbirds 49–41 in the final.

=== Pool A Matches ===
Pos	Team	Pld	W	D	L	GF	GA	GD	Pts	Qualification
1	West Coast Fever	3	2	0	1	136	127	+9	8	Final
2	Sunshine Coast Lightning	3	1	1	1	127	125	+2	6	Classification matches
3	New South Wales Swifts	3	1	1	1	124	125	−1	6	Classification matches
4	Collingwood Magpies	3	0	2	1	123	133	−10	4	Classification matches

Updated to match(es) played on 25 February 2023. Source:

24 February 2023; 5:00pm AEDT	Report; Stats	New South Wales Swifts	41 – 37	West Coast Fever	Gold Coast Sports and Leisure Centre

24 February 2023; 7:00pm AEDT	Report; Stats	Sunshine Coast Lightning	38 – 38	Collingwood Magpies	Gold Coast Sports and Leisure Centre

25 February 2023; 12:00pm AEDT	Report; Stats	Collingwood Magpies	42 – 42	New South Wales Swifts	Gold Coast Sports and Leisure Centre

25 February 2023; 1:00pm AEDT	Report; Stats	West Coast Fever	46 – 43	Sunshine Coast Lightning	Gold Coast Sports and Leisure Centre

25 February 2023; 6:00pm AEDT	Report; Stats	West Coast Fever	53 – 43	Collingwood Magpies	Gold Coast Sports and Leisure Centre

25 February 2023; 7:00pm AEDT	Report; Stats	Sunshine Coast Lightning	46 – 41	New South Wales Swifts	Gold Coast Sports and Leisure Centre

=== Pool B Matches ===
Pos	Team	Pld	W	D	L	GF	GA	GD	Pts	Qualification
1	Adelaide Thunderbirds	3	3	0	0	124	97	+27	12	Final
2	Melbourne Vixens	3	1	0	2	120	117	+3	4	Classification matches
3	Giants Netball	3	1	0	2	119	123	−4	4	Classification matches
4	Queensland Firebirds	3	1	0	2	113	139	−26	4	Classification matches

Updated to match(es) played on 25 February 2023. Source:

24 February 2023; 6:00pm AEDT	Report; Stats	Melbourne Vixens	47 – 40	Giants Netball	Gold Coast Sports and Leisure Centre

24 February 2023; 8:00pm AEDT	Report; Stats	Queensland Firebirds	33 – 51	Adelaide Thunderbirds	Gold Coast Sports and Leisure Centre

25 February 2023; 2:00pm AEDT	Report; Stats	Adelaide Thunderbirds	34 – 33	Melbourne Vixens	Gold Coast Sports and Leisure Centre

25 February 2023; 3:00pm AEDT	Report; Stats	Giants Netball	48 – 37	Queensland Firebirds	Gold Coast Sports and Leisure Centre

25 February 2023; 8:00pm AEDT	Report; Stats	Melbourne Vixens	40 – 43	Queensland Firebirds	Gold Coast Sports and Leisure Centre

25 February 2023; 9:00pm AEDT	Report; Stats	Adelaide Thunderbirds	39 – 31	Giants Netball	Gold Coast Sports and Leisure Centre

=== Finals ===
26 February 2023; 12:00pm AEDT	Report; Stats	Collingwood Magpies	40 – 49	Queensland Firebirds	Gold Coast Sports and Leisure Centre

26 February 2023; 1:00pm AEDT	Report; Stats	New South Wales Swifts	44 – 38	Giants Netball	Gold Coast Sports and Leisure Centre

26 February 2023; 2:00pm AEDT	Report; Stats	Sunshine Coast Lightning	38 – 39	Melbourne Vixens	Gold Coast Sports and Leisure Centre

26 February 2023; 3:00pm AEDT	Report; Stats	West Coast Fever	49 – 41	Adelaide Thunderbirds	Gold Coast Sports and Leisure Centre

Place	Team
Champions	West Coast Fever
Runners-up	Adelaide Thunderbirds
Third	Melbourne Vixens
4	Sunshine Coast Lightning
5	New South Wales Swifts
6	Giants Netball
7	Queensland Firebirds
8	Collingwood Magpies

2023 #TeamGirls Cup winners

== Regular season ==
- Source: Click here (all times are in local time)

=== Round 1 ===
Saturday 18 March	Collingwood Magpies	71 – 63	New South Wales Swifts	John Cain Arena
5:00pm AEDT	2 Goal Shots; Sophie Garbin 6/7 (86%); 1 Goal Shots; Shimona Nelson 53/53 (100%); Sophie Garbin 6/9 (67%)	Report; Stats	2 Goal Shots; Helen Housby 6/10 (60%); Romelda Aiken-George 1/2 (50%); 1 Goal Shots; Romelda Aiken-George 30/35 (86%); Helen Housby 13/13 (100%); Sophie Fawns 6/8 (75%)	Attendance: 1,505

Saturday 18 March	West Coast Fever	62 – 61	Melbourne Vixens	RAC Arena
4:00pm AWST	2 Goal Shots; Sasha Glasgow 1/3 (33%); 1 Goal Shots; Jhaniele Fowler 55/55 (100%); Sasha Glasgow 5/6 (83%)	Report; Stats	2 Goal Shots; Kiera Austin 3/7 (43%); Mwai Kumwenda 0/2 (0%); 1 Goal Shots; Mwai Kumwenda 37/38 (97%); Kiera Austin 18/23 (78%)	Attendance: 6,403

Sunday 19 March	Sunshine Coast Lightning	66 – 50	Giants Netball	UniSC Arena
1:00pm AEST	2 Goal Shots; Steph Wood 1/4 (25%); 1 Goal Shots; Cara Koenen 51/57 (89%); Steph Wood 13/16 (81%)	Report; Stats	2 Goal Shots; Matisse Letherbarrow 7/11 (64%); Sophie Dwyer 2/4 (50%); 1 Goal Shots; Matisse Letherbarrow 23/25 (92%); Sophie Dwyer 9/11 (82%)	Attendance: 2,068

Sunday 19 March	Queensland Firebirds	44 – 59	Adelaide Thunderbirds	Nissan Arena
3:00pm AEST	2 Goal Shots; Mia Stower 1/3 (33%); Donnell Wallam 1/4 (25%); 1 Goal Shots; Donnell Wallam 34/38 (89%); Mia Stower 4/8 (50%); Emily Moore 2/3 (67%)	Report; Stats	2 Goal Shots; Eleanor Cardwell 3/8 (38%); Tippah Dwan 1/2 (50%); 1 Goal Shots; Eleanor Cardwell 28/30 (93%); Tippah Dwan 16/20 (80%); Lucy Austin 7/9 (78%)	Attendance: 3,326

=== Round 2 ===
Saturday 25 March	Queensland Firebirds	55 – 65	Sunshine Coast Lightning	Nissan Arena
4:00pm AEST	2 Goal Shots; Emily Moore 2/5 (40%); Donnell Wallam 1/6 (17%); Mia Stower 0/1 (0%); 1 Goal Shots; Donnell Wallam 40/47 (85%); Mia Stower 5/7 (71%); Emily Moore 4/6 (67%)	Report; Stats	2 Goal Shots; Steph Wood 1/1 (100%); 1 Goal Shots; Cara Koenen 52/53 (98%); Steph Wood 10/12 (83%); Charlie Bell 1/1 (100%)

Saturday 25 March	Adelaide Thunderbirds	25 – 25 ^{(1)}	New South Wales Swifts	Netball SA Stadium
7:30pm ACDT^{(1)}	2 Goal Shots; Eleanor Cardwell 3/3 (100%); 1 Goal Shots; Eleanor Cardwell 10/10 (100%); Lucy Austin 7/9 (78%); Tippah Dwan 2/2 (100%)	Report; Stats	2 Goal Shots; Helen Housby 0/1 (0%); 1 Goal Shots; Romelda Aiken-George 15/19 (79%); Helen Housby 10/13 (77%)

Sunday 26 March	Giants Netball	73 – 74	West Coast Fever	Ken Rosewall Arena
2:00pm AEDT	2 Goal Shots; Sophie Dwyer 8/10 (80%); Jo Harten 7/13 (54%); 1 Goal Shots; Jo Harten 22/23 (96%); Sophie Dwyer 21/24 (88%)	Report; Stats	2 Goal Shots; Sasha Glasgow 5/7 (71%); 1 Goal Shots; Jhaniele Fowler 59/59 (100%); Sasha Glasgow 5/6 (83%)

Sunday 26 March	Collingwood Magpies	61 – 62	Melbourne Vixens	John Cain Arena
4:00pm AEDT	2 Goal Shots; Sophie Garbin 3/5 (60%); 1 Goal Shots; Shimona Nelson 47/48 (98%); Sophie Garbin 8/9 (89%)	Report; Stats	2 Goal Shots; Mwai Kumwenda 4/4 (100%); Kiera Austin 1/4 (25%); 1 Goal Shots; Mwai Kumwenda 31/35 (89%); Kiera Austin 21/23 (91%)

- ^1 The match between the Adelaide Thunderbirds and the New South Wales Swifts was initially scheduled to commence at 6:30 pm ACDT, but was delayed by an hour due to further work being completed on the playing surface. Additionally, due to a high-voltage transformer issue causing a power outage at Netball SA Stadium at half-time, the match was called off as it was unable to be completed in the allocated timeframe. The game was declared a draw, with both teams sharing 2 competition points and having the goals for and against included in the ladder.

=== Round 3 ===
Saturday 1 April	New South Wales Swifts	74 – 71	Queensland Firebirds	Ken Rosewall Arena
5:00pm AEDT	2 Goal Shots; Helen Housby 6/9 (67%); 1 Goal Shots; Romelda Aiken-George 39/48 (81%); Helen Housby 22/22 (100%); Sophie Fawns 1/1 (100%)	Report; Stats	2 Goal Shots; Mia Stower 3/3 (100%); Donnell Wallam 0/3 (0%); 1 Goal Shots; Donnell Wallam 60/63 (95%); Mia Stower 5/11 (45%)

Saturday 1 April	Sunshine Coast Lightning	42 – 66	Adelaide Thunderbirds	UniSC Arena
6:00pm AEST	2 Goal Shots; Charlie Bell 0/1 (0%); Steph Wood 0/5 (0%); 1 Goal Shots; Cara Koenen 28/28 (100%); Steph Wood 9/11 (82%); Charlie Bell 5/6 (83%)	Report; Stats	2 Goal Shots; Eleanor Cardwell 4/6 (67%); Tippah Dwan 0/1 (0%); 1 Goal Shots; Eleanor Cardwell 47/48 (98%); Tippah Dwan 11/11 (100%)

Sunday 2 April	West Coast Fever	80 – 53	Collingwood Magpies	RAC Arena
12:00pm AWST	2 Goal Shots; Sasha Glasgow 10/16 (63%); Emma Cosh 0/1 (0%); 1 Goal Shots; Jhaniele Fowler 51/52 (98%); Sasha Glasgow 6/9 (67%); Emma Cosh 3/5 (60%)	Report; Stats	2 Goal Shots; Sophie Garbin 7/16 (44%); Kelly Singleton 1/2 (50%); 1 Goal Shots; Shimona Nelson 20/20 (100%); Sophie Garbin 14/18 (78%); Kelly Singleton 3/6 (50%)

Sunday 2 April	Melbourne Vixens	62 – 57	Giants Netball	John Cain Arena
4:00pm AEST	2 Goal Shots; Mwai Kumwenda 3/5 (60%); Kiera Austin 2/3 (67%); 1 Goal Shots; Mwai Kumwenda 39/42 (93%); Kiera Austin 13/15 (87%)	Report; Stats	2 Goal Shots; Sophie Dwyer 6/9 (67%); Jo Harten 2/5 (40%); 1 Goal Shots; Jo Harten 23/26 (88%); Sophie Dwyer 18/20 (90%)

=== Round 4 ===
Saturday 8 April	Melbourne Vixens	60 – 56	Sunshine Coast Lightning	John Cain Arena
7:00pm AEST	2 Goal Shots; Mwai Kumwenda 2/3 (67%); Kiera Austin 1/3 (33%); 1 Goal Shots; Mwai Kumwenda 36/40 (90%); Kiera Austin 18/19 (95%)	Report; Stats	2 Goal Shots; Steph Wood 2/3 (67%); Cara Koenen 1/1 (100%); 1 Goal Shots; Cara Koenen 40/42 (95%); Steph Wood 10/11 (91%)

Sunday 9 April	Collingwood Magpies	69 – 61	Queensland Firebirds	John Cain Arena
2:00pm AEST	2 Goal Shots; Sophie Garbin 1/6 (17%); 1 Goal Shots; Shimona Nelson 61/66 (92%); Sophie Garbin 6/6 (100%)	Report; Stats	2 Goal Shots; Mia Stower 3/5 (60%); Donnell Wallam 3/6 (50%); Emily Moore 1/2 (50%); 1 Goal Shots; Donnell Wallam 38/39 (97%); Mia Stower 9/10 (90%); Emily Moore 0/1 (0%)

Sunday 9 April	Adelaide Thunderbirds	54 – 59	Giants Netball	Netball SA Stadium
3:30pm ACST	2 Goal Shots; Eleanor Cardwell 5/10 (50%); Lucy Austin 2/2 (100%); Tippah Dwan 1/1 (100%); 1 Goal Shots; Eleanor Cardwell 23/24 (96%); Lucy Austin 13/15 (87%); Tippah Dwan 2/2 (100%)	Report; Stats	2 Goal Shots; Sophie Dwyer 6/10 (60%); Jo Harten 3/5 (60%); 1 Goal Shots; Jo Harten 22/25 (88%); Sophie Dwyer 19/22 (86%)

Monday 10 April	New South Wales Swifts	67 – 78	West Coast Fever	Ken Rosewall Arena
1:00pm AEST	2 Goal Shots; Helen Housby 7/11 (64%); Sophie Fawns 1/3 (33%); 1 Goal Shots; Romelda Aiken-George 33/37 (89%); Helen Housby 17/18 (94%); Sophie Fawns 1/1 (100%)	Report; Stats	2 Goal Shots; Sasha Glasgow 7/8 (88%); Jhaniele Fowler 1/2 (50%); 1 Goal Shots; Jhaniele Fowler 54/55 (98%); Sasha Glasgow 8/9 (89%)

=== Round 5 ===
Saturday 15 April	Giants Netball	59 – 55	Collingwood Magpies	Ken Rosewall Arena
5:00pm AEST	2 Goal Shots; Sophie Dwyer 2/4 (50%); Jo Harten 1/2 (50%); 1 Goal Shots; Jo Harten 33/35 (94%); Sophie Dwyer 20/22 (91%)	Report; Stats	2 Goal Shots; Kelly Singleton 4/6 (67%); Sophie Garbin 2/7 (29%); Shimona Nelson 0/1 (0%); 1 Goal Shots; Shimona Nelson 36/38 (95%); Sophie Garbin 7/8 (88%)

Saturday 15 April	Adelaide Thunderbirds	61 – 50	Melbourne Vixens	Netball SA Stadium
6:30pm ACST	2 Goal Shots; Eleanor Cardwell 5/6 (83%); Tippah Dwan 0/2 (0%); 1 Goal Shots; Eleanor Cardwell 30/32 (94%); Tippah Dwan 21/23 (91%)	Report; Stats	2 Goal Shots; Kiera Austin 4/11 (36%); Mwai Kumwenda 3/5 (60%); 1 Goal Shots; Mwai Kumwenda 22/24 (92%); Kiera Austin 14/17 (82%)

Sunday 16 April	Queensland Firebirds	71 – 73	West Coast Fever	Nissan Arena
2:00pm AEST	2 Goal Shots; Donnell Wallam 7/10 (70%); Emily Moore 1/2 (50%); Mia Stower 1/2 (50%); 1 Goal Shots; Donnell Wallam 48/53 (91%); Emily Moore 3/3 (100%); Mia Stower 2/2 (100%)	Report; Stats	2 Goal Shots; Sasha Glasgow 3/6 (50%); Emma Cosh 0/1 (0%); 1 Goal Shots; Jhaniele Fowler 60/61 (98%); Sasha Glasgow 5/5 (100%); Emma Cosh 2/5 (40%)

Sunday 16 April	Sunshine Coast Lightning	63 – 64	New South Wales Swifts	UniSC Arena
4:00pm AEST	2 Goal Shots; Steph Wood 1/2 (50%); 1 Goal Shots; Cara Koenen 40/42 (95%); Steph Wood 21/23 (91%)	Report; Stats	2 Goal Shots; Helen Housby 3/4 (75%); 1 Goal Shots; Romelda Aiken-George 43/49 (88%); Helen Housby 15/16 (94%)

=== Round 6 ===
Saturday 22 April	New South Wales Swifts	67 – 66	Melbourne Vixens	Ken Rosewall Arena
7:00pm AEST	2 Goal Shots; Helen Housby 4/7 (57%); 1 Goal Shots; Romelda Aiken-George 46/52 (88%); Helen Housby 12/12 (100%); Sophie Fawns 1/1 (100%)	Report; Stats	2 Goal Shots; Mwai Kumwenda 1/2 (50%); Kiera Austin 1/2 (50%); 1 Goal Shots; Mwai Kumwenda 47/50 (94%); Kiera Austin 15/18 (83%)

Sunday 23 April	Queensland Firebirds	70 – 66	Giants Netball	Nissan Arena
2:00pm AEST	2 Goal Shots; Donnell Wallam 4/4 (100%); Emily Moore 2/3 (67%); 1 Goal Shots; Donnell Wallam 51/53 (96%); Emily Moore 5/5 (100%); Mia Stower 2/2 (100%)	Report; Stats	2 Goal Shots; Sophie Dwyer 9/13 (69%); Matisse Letherbarrow 3/5 (60%); Jo Harten 1/6 (17%); 1 Goal Shots; Sophie Dwyer 17/20 (85%); Matisse Letherbarrow 14/15 (93%); Jo Harten 9/9 (100%)

Sunday 23 April	West Coast Fever	63 – 64	Adelaide Thunderbirds	RAC Arena
2:00pm AWST	2 Goal Shots; Sasha Glasgow 4/5 (80%); 1 Goal Shots; Jhaniele Fowler 51/53 (96%); Sasha Glasgow 4/4 (100%)	Report; Stats	2 Goal Shots; Eleanor Cardwell 8/14 (57%); Tippah Dwan 1/4 (25%); 1 Goal Shots; Eleanor Cardwell 33/34 (97%); Tippah Dwan 13/15 (87%)

Tuesday 25 April	Collingwood Magpies	50 – 65	Sunshine Coast Lightning	John Cain Arena
1:00pm AEST	2 Goal Shots; Shimona Nelson 2/3 (67%); Kelly Singleton 2/9 (22%); Sophie Garbin 0/3 (0%); 1 Goal Shots; Shimona Nelson 38/42 (90%); Kelly Singleton 2/3 (67%); Sophie Garbin 2/4 (50%)	Report; Stats	2 Goal Shots; Steph Wood 5/9 (56%); 1 Goal Shots; Cara Koenen 39/40 (98%); Steph Wood 9/11 (82%); Charlie Bell 7/9 (78%)

=== Round 7 ===
Saturday 29 April	Melbourne Vixens	72 – 60	Queensland Firebirds	John Cain Arena
5:00pm AEST	2 Goal Shots; Kiera Austin 2/3 (67%); Mwai Kumwenda 2/4 (50%); 1 Goal Shots; Mwai Kumwenda 45/51 (88%); Kiera Austin 19/22 (86%)	Report; Stats	2 Goal Shots; Donnell Wallam 2/5 (40%); Mia Stower 1/2 (50%); Emily Moore 0/1 (0%); 1 Goal Shots; Donnell Wallam 51/53 (96%); Mia Stower 2/4 (50%); Emily Moore 1/2 (50%)

Saturday 29 April	Giants Netball	64 – 67	New South Wales Swifts	Ken Rosewall Arena
7:00pm AEST	2 Goal Shots; Sophie Dwyer 7/8 (88%); Jo Harten 2/5 (40%); 1 Goal Shots; Jo Harten 31/33 (94%); Sophie Dwyer 15/18 (83%)	Report; Stats	2 Goal Shots; Helen Housby 4/4 (100%); Romelda Aiken-George 1/1 (100%); Sophie Fawns 0/1 (0%); 1 Goal Shots; Romelda Aiken-George 44/51 (86%); Helen Housby 11/11 (100%); Sophie Fawns 2/2 (100%)	Attendance: 7,028

Sunday 30 April	Sunshine Coast Lightning	64 – 74	West Coast Fever	UniSC Arena
2:00pm AEST	2 Goal Shots; Steph Wood 7/12 (58%); Cara Koenen 0/1 (0%); 1 Goal Shots; Cara Koenen 34/36 (94%); Steph Wood 16/18 (89%)	Report; Stats	2 Goal Shots; Sasha Glasgow 3/6 (50%); 1 Goal Shots; Jhaniele Fowler 65/65 (100%); Sasha Glasgow 3/4 (75%)

Sunday 30 April	Adelaide Thunderbirds	52 – 47	Collingwood Magpies	Netball SA Stadium
3:30pm ACST	2 Goal Shots; Eleanor Cardwell 2/2 (100%); Tippah Dwan 0/1 (0%); 1 Goal Shots; Eleanor Cardwell 31/35 (89%); Tippah Dwan 13/14 (93%); Lucy Austin 4/6 (67%)	Report; Stats	2 Goal Shots; Kelly Singleton 3/5 (60%); Sophie Garbin 2/4 (50%); 1 Goal Shots; Shimona Nelson 30/32 (94%); Sophie Garbin 4/6 (67%); Kelly Singleton 3/5 (60%)

=== Round 8 - Inclusion Round ===
Saturday 6 May	Queensland Firebirds	73 – 67	Collingwood Magpies	Nissan Arena
5:00pm AEST	2 Goal Shots; Emily Moore 1/2 (50%); Donnell Wallam 1/3 (33%); 1 Goal Shots; Donnell Wallam 64/65 (98%); Emily Moore 5/7 (71%)	Report; Stats	2 Goal Shots; Sophie Garbin 3/7 (43%); Kelly Singleton 2/4 (50%); 1 Goal Shots; Shimona Nelson 56/58 (97%); Sophie Garbin 1/1 (100%)

Saturday 6 May	Giants Netball	50 – 54	Adelaide Thunderbirds	Ken Rosewall Arena
7:00pm AEST	2 Goal Shots; Sophie Dwyer 3/10 (30%); Jo Harten 2/10 (20%); 1 Goal Shots; Jo Harten 23/25 (92%); Sophie Dwyer 17/20 (85%)	Report; Stats	2 Goal Shots; Eleanor Cardwell 3/6 (50%); Tippah Dwan 1/1 (100%); Lucy Austin 0/2 (0%); 1 Goal Shots; Eleanor Cardwell 26/27 (96%); Lucy Austin 13/15 (87%); Tippah Dwan 7/10 (70%)

Sunday 7 May	Melbourne Vixens	74 – 73	West Coast Fever	John Cain Arena
2:00pm AEST	2 Goal Shots; Mwai Kumwenda 2/2 (100%); Kiera Austin 1/4 (25%); 1 Goal Shots; Mwai Kumwenda 45/50 (90%); Kiera Austin 23/29 (79%)	Report; Stats	2 Goal Shots; Sasha Glasgow 8/12 (67%); Jhaniele Fowler 2/3 (67%); 1 Goal Shots; Jhaniele Fowler 48/49 (98%); Sasha Glasgow 5/7 (71%)

Sunday 7 May	New South Wales Swifts	67 – 63	Sunshine Coast Lightning	Ken Rosewall Arena
4:00pm AEST	2 Goal Shots; Helen Housby 7/10 (70%); Romelda Aiken-George 0/2 (0%); 1 Goal Shots; Romelda Aiken-George 38/47 (81%); Helen Housby 15/15 (100%)	Report; Stats	2 Goal Shots; Steph Wood 9/11 (82%); Cara Koenen 1/2 (50%); 1 Goal Shots; Cara Koenen 37/42 (88%); Steph Wood 6/8 (75%)

=== Round 9 ===
Saturday 13 May	Adelaide Thunderbirds	63 – 46	Queensland Firebirds	Netball SA Stadium
4:30pm ACST	2 Goal Shots; Eleanor Cardwell 2/3 (67%); Georgie Horjus 2/4 (50%); 1 Goal Shots; Eleanor Cardwell 27/32 (84%); Lucy Austin 19/21 (90%); Georgie Horjus 6/7 (86%); Tippah Dwan 3/4 (75%)	Report; Stats	2 Goal Shots; Donnell Wallam 5/13 (38%); Emily Moore 1/1 (100%); 1 Goal Shots; Donnell Wallam 24/29 (83%); Emily Moore 10/13 (77%)

Saturday 13 May	West Coast Fever	64 – 65	New South Wales Swifts	RAC Arena
5:00pm AWST	2 Goal Shots; Emma Cosh 2/3 (67%); Natalie Butler 1/1 (100%); 1 Goal Shots; Jhaniele Fowler 53/55 (96%); Natalie Butler 3/4 (75%); Emma Cosh 2/2 (100%)	Report; Stats	2 Goal Shots; Helen Housby 10/14 (71%); 1 Goal Shots; Romelda Aiken-George 28/34 (82%); Helen Housby 17/19 (89%)

Sunday 14 May	Sunshine Coast Lightning	61 – 62	Melbourne Vixens	UniSC Arena
2:00pm AEST	2 Goal Shots; Steph Wood 9/11 (82%); 1 Goal Shots; Cara Koenen 27/28 (96%); Steph Wood 16/18 (89%)	Report; Stats	2 Goal Shots; Kiera Austin 4/5 (80%); 1 Goal Shots; Mwai Kumwenda 45/48 (94%); Kiera Austin 9/9 (100%)

Sunday 14 May	Collingwood Magpies	56 – 69	Giants Netball	John Cain Arena
4:00pm AEST	2 Goal Shots; Shimona Nelson 2/2 (100%); Sophie Garbin 1/3 (33%); Kelly Singleton 0/2 (0%); 1 Goal Shots; Shimona Nelson 46/46 (100%); Sophie Garbin 4/7 (57%)	Report; Stats	2 Goal Shots; Matisse Letherbarrow 5/6 (83%); Sophie Dwyer 5/6 (83%); 1 Goal Shots; Matisse Letherbarrow 37/41 (90%); Sophie Dwyer 12/13 (92%)

=== Round 10 ===
Saturday 20 May	Giants Netball	70 – 64	Sunshine Coast Lightning	Ken Rosewall Arena
5:00pm AEST	2 Goal Shots; Matisse Letherbarrow 5/8 (63%); Sophie Dwyer 3/4 (75%); 1 Goal Shots; Matisse Letherbarrow 41/44 (93%); Sophie Dwyer 13/15 (87%)	Report; Stats	2 Goal Shots; Steph Wood 4/10 (40%); Charlie Bell 0/1 (0%); 1 Goal Shots; Cara Koenen 35/37 (95%); Steph Wood 14/16 (88%); Charlie Bell 7/8 (88%)

Saturday 20 May	Melbourne Vixens	60 – 39	Adelaide Thunderbirds	John Cain Arena
7:00pm AEST	2 Goal Shots; Kiera Austin 5/6 (83%); Mwai Kumwenda 3/3 (100%); 1 Goal Shots; Kiera Austin 23/30 (77%); Mwai Kumwenda 21/22 (95%)	Report; Stats	2 Goal Shots; Georgie Horjus 1/5 (20%); Lucy Austin 0/1 (0%); Eleanor Cardwell 0/3 (0%); 1 Goal Shots; Eleanor Cardwell 21/24 (88%); Lucy Austin 8/9 (89%); Georgie Horjus 8/11 (73%)

Sunday 21 May	New South Wales Swifts	85 – 56	Collingwood Magpies	Ken Rosewall Arena
2:00pm AEST	2 Goal Shots; Helen Housby 9/12 (75%); Sophie Fawns 5/6 (83%); 1 Goal Shots; Romelda Aiken-George 26/32 (81%); Sophie Fawns 17/22 (77%); Helen Housby 14/17 (82%)	Report; Stats	2 Goal Shots; Kelly Singleton 5/10 (50%); Sophie Garbin 3/5 (60%); Shimona Nelson 0/1 (0%); 1 Goal Shots; Shimona Nelson 35/37 (95%); Sophie Garbin 4/5 (80%); Kelly Singleton 1/1 (100%)

Sunday 21 May	West Coast Fever	97 – 63	Queensland Firebirds	RAC Arena
2:00pm AWST	2 Goal Shots; Sasha Glasgow 14/20 (70%); Jhaniele Fowler 1/4 (25%); 1 Goal Shots; Jhaniele Fowler 52/56 (93%); Sasha Glasgow 15/15 (100%)	Report; Stats	2 Goal Shots; Donnell Wallam 6/11 (55%); Mia Stower 2/3 (67%); Emily Moore 0/3 (0%); 1 Goal Shots; Donnell Wallam 37/40 (93%); Emily Moore 6/6 (100%); Mia Stower 4/4 (100%)

=== Round 11 - First Nations Round (Week 1) ===
Saturday 27 May	Sunshine Coast Lightning	66 – 62	Collingwood Magpies	UniSC Arena
5:00pm AEST	2 Goal Shots; Steph Wood 6/9 (67%); 1 Goal Shots; Cara Koenen 34/35 (97%); Steph Wood 20/24 (83%)	Report; Stats	2 Goal Shots; Shimona Nelson 1/1 (100%); Sophie Garbin 0/5 (0%); 1 Goal Shots; Shimona Nelson 53/56 (95%); Sophie Garbin 6/8 (75%); Kelly Singleton 1/2 (50%)

Saturday 27 May	Adelaide Thunderbirds	54 – 53	West Coast Fever	Netball SA Stadium
6:30pm ACST	2 Goal Shots; Eleanor Cardwell 3/4 (75%); Georgie Horjus 1/1 (100%); Tippah Dwan 0/1 (0%); Lucy Austin 0/1 (0%); 1 Goal Shots; Eleanor Cardwell 26/30 (87%); Tippah Dwan 10/12 (83%); Lucy Austin 6/6 (100%); Georgie Horjus 4/4 (100%)	Report; Stats	2 Goal Shots; Sasha Glasgow 5/7 (71%); Jhaniele Fowler 0/3 (0%); 1 Goal Shots; Jhaniele Fowler 42/43 (98%); Sasha Glasgow 1/2 (50%)

Sunday 28 May	Melbourne Vixens	62 – 70	New South Wales Swifts	John Cain Arena
2:00pm AEST	2 Goal Shots; Kiera Austin 6/10 (60%); Mwai Kumwenda 2/6 (33%); 1 Goal Shots; Mwai Kumwenda 33/35 (94%); Kiera Austin 12/17 (71%); Kimberly Borger 1/2 (50%)	Report; Stats	2 Goal Shots; Sophie Fawns 7/10 (70%); Helen Housby 3/5 (60%); 1 Goal Shots; Romelda Aiken-George 29/34 (85%); Helen Housby 16/16 (100%); Sophie Fawns 5/6 (83%)

Sunday 28 May	Giants Netball	50 – 68	Queensland Firebirds	Ken Rosewall Arena
4:00pm AEST	2 Goal Shots; Matisse Letherbarrow 2/2 (100%); Sophie Dwyer 1/4 (25%); Jo Harten 0/1 (0%); 1 Goal Shots; Jo Harten 25/26 (96%); Sophie Dwyer 12/15 (80%); Matisse Letherbarrow 7/7 (100%)	Report; Stats	2 Goal Shots; Mia Stower 2/4 (50%); Emily Moore 1/2 (50%); Donnell Wallam 0/2 (0%); 1 Goal Shots; Donnell Wallam 44/46 (96%); Emily Moore 10/10 (100%); Mia Stower 8/8 (100%)

=== Round 12 - First Nations Round (Week 2) ===
Saturday 3 June	Collingwood Magpies	53 – 50	Adelaide Thunderbirds	John Cain Arena
5:00pm AEST	2 Goal Shots; Sophie Garbin 0/1 (0%); 1 Goal Shots; Shimona Nelson 44/44 (100%); Sophie Garbin 9/9 (100%)	Report; Stats	2 Goal Shots; Eleanor Cardwell 3/4 (75%); Tippah Dwan 2/4 (50%); Lucy Austin 1/1 (100%); 1 Goal Shots; Eleanor Cardwell 27/29 (93%); Tippah Dwan 10/11 (91%); Lucy Austin 1/2 (50%)

Saturday 3 June	West Coast Fever	69 – 65	Sunshine Coast Lightning	RAC Arena
5:00pm AWST	2 Goal Shots; Sasha Glasgow 5/9 (56%); 1 Goal Shots; Jhaniele Fowler 54/58 (93%); Sasha Glasgow 5/6 (83%)	Report; Stats	2 Goal Shots; Steph Wood 5/13 (38%); Cara Koenen 0/1 (0%); 1 Goal Shots; Cara Koenen 38/39 (97%); Charlie Bell 9/10 (90%); Steph Wood 8/10 (80%)	Attendance: 10,764

Sunday 4 June	New South Wales Swifts	68 – 63	Giants Netball	Ken Rosewall Arena
2:00pm AEST	2 Goal Shots; Helen Housby 5/7 (71%); Sophie Fawns 4/5 (80%); Romelda Aiken-George 0/1 (0%); 1 Goal Shots; Romelda Aiken-George 32/39 (82%); Helen Housby 18/18 (100%); Sophie Fawns 0/1 (0%)	Report; Stats	2 Goal Shots; Sophie Dwyer 5/10 (50%); Jo Harten 4/5 (80%); Matisse Letherbarrow 4/8 (50%); 1 Goal Shots; Jo Harten 13/14 (93%); Matisse Letherbarrow 13/14 (93%); Sophie Dwyer 11/13 (85%)	Attendance: 9,546

Sunday 4 June	Queensland Firebirds	76 – 71	Melbourne Vixens	Nissan Arena
4:00pm AEST	2 Goal Shots; Donnell Wallam 6/8 (75%); Emily Moore 1/1 (100%); 1 Goal Shots; Donnell Wallam 59/62 (95%); Emily Moore 3/5 (60%)	Report; Stats	2 Goal Shots; Kiera Austin 6/10 (60%); Mwai Kumwenda 1/2 (50%); 1 Goal Shots; Mwai Kumwenda 42/49 (86%); Kiera Austin 15/17 (88%)

=== Round 13 ===
Saturday 10 June	Adelaide Thunderbirds	54 – 56	Sunshine Coast Lightning	Adelaide Entertainment Centre
6:30pm ACST	2 Goal Shots; Eleanor Cardwell 4/6 (67%); Lucy Austin 3/3 (100%); Tippah Dwan 0/2 (0%); 1 Goal Shots; Eleanor Cardwell 24/30 (80%); Tippah Dwan 8/9 (89%); Lucy Austin 8/10 (80%)	Report; Stats	2 Goal Shots; Steph Wood 1/2 (50%); 1 Goal Shots; Cara Koenen 33/38 (87%); Steph Wood 21/23 (91%)

Sunday 11 June	West Coast Fever	72 – 61	Giants Netball	RAC Arena
12:00pm AWST	2 Goal Shots; Sasha Glasgow 4/5 (80%); Jhaniele Fowler 0/2 (0%); 1 Goal Shots; Jhaniele Fowler 61/62 (98%); Sasha Glasgow 3/3 (100%)	Report; Stats	2 Goal Shots; Sophie Dwyer 6/9 (67%); Jo Harten 3/7 (43%); Matisse Letherbarrow 2/4 (50%); 1 Goal Shots; Jo Harten 19/22 (86%); Matisse Letherbarrow 10/12 (83%); Sophie Dwyer 10/16 (63%)	Attendance: 11,013

Sunday 11 June	Queensland Firebirds	65 – 78	New South Wales Swifts	Nissan Arena
4:00pm AEST	2 Goal Shots; Donnell Wallam 6/12 (50%); Mia Stower 3/4 (75%); Emily Moore 1/3 (33%); 1 Goal Shots; Donnell Wallam 34/38 (89%); Emily Moore 8/9 (89%); Mia Stower 3/5 (60%)	Report; Stats	2 Goal Shots; Helen Housby 8/15 (53%); Sophie Fawns 1/2 (50%); 1 Goal Shots; Romelda Aiken-George 43/50 (86%); Helen Housby 17/18 (94%)

Monday 12 June	Melbourne Vixens	64 – 55	Collingwood Magpies	John Cain Arena
1:00pm AEST	2 Goal Shots; Kiera Austin 4/6 (67%); Mwai Kumwenda 3/4 (75%); 1 Goal Shots; Mwai Kumwenda 34/37 (92%); Kiera Austin 15/15 (100%); Kimberly Borger 1/1 (100%)	Report; Stats	2 Goal Shots; Shimona Nelson 1/2 (50%); Sophie Garbin 1/4 (25%); Kelly Singleton 0/1 (0%); 1 Goal Shots; Shimona Nelson 42/43 (98%); Sophie Garbin 9/10 (90%)

=== Round 14 ===
Saturday 17 June	New South Wales Swifts	57 – 60	Adelaide Thunderbirds	Ken Rosewall Arena
5:00pm AEST	2 Goal Shots; Helen Housby 6/8 (75%); Sophie Fawns 2/6 (33%); Romelda Aiken-George 0/1 (0%); 1 Goal Shots; Romelda Aiken-George 27/30 (90%); Helen Housby 11/12 (92%); Sophie Fawns 3/3 (100%)	Report; Stats	2 Goal Shots; Eleanor Cardwell 5/7 (71%); Tippah Dwan 1/1 (100%); 1 Goal Shots; Eleanor Cardwell 24/27 (89%); Lucy Austin 16/20 (80%); Tippah Dwan 8/10 (80%)

Saturday 17 June	Collingwood Magpies	65 – 62	West Coast Fever	Silverdome
7:00pm AEST	2 Goal Shots; Sophie Garbin 1/2 (50%); 1 Goal Shots; Shimona Nelson 51/55 (93%); Sophie Garbin 12/16 (75%)	Report; Stats	2 Goal Shots; Jhaniele Fowler 1/1 (100%); Sasha Glasgow 1/4 (25%); 1 Goal Shots; Jhaniele Fowler 53/55 (96%); Sasha Glasgow 5/7 (71%)	Attendance: 2,990

Sunday 18 June	Sunshine Coast Lightning	66 – 60	Queensland Firebirds	UniSC Arena
2:00pm AEST	2 Goal Shots; Steph Wood 3/5 (60%); 1 Goal Shots; Cara Koenen 46/50 (92%); Steph Wood 14/16 (88%); Charlie Bell 0/1 (0%)	Report; Stats	2 Goal Shots; Donnell Wallam 8/16 (50%); Emily Moore 1/1 (100%); 1 Goal Shots; Donnell Wallam 35/42 (83%); Emily Moore 6/10 (60%); Mia Stower 1/3 (33%)

Sunday 18 June	Giants Netball	60 – 57	Melbourne Vixens	Ken Rosewall Arena
4:00pm AEST	2 Goal Shots; Jo Harten 5/8 (63%); Sophie Dwyer 4/7 (57%); Matisse Letherbarrow 1/5 (20%); 1 Goal Shots; Jo Harten 28/28 (100%); Sophie Dwyer 12/17 (71%)	Report; Stats	2 Goal Shots; Kiera Austin 2/4 (50%); Mwai Kumwenda 1/2 (50%); 1 Goal Shots; Mwai Kumwenda 42/45 (93%); Kiera Austin 9/10 (90%)

== Ladder ==
2023 Suncorp Super Netball ladder
Pos	Team	P	W	D	L	GF	GA	%	PTS
1	New South Wales Swifts	14	10	1	3	917	871	105.28	42
2	Adelaide Thunderbirds	14	9	1	4	755	705	107.09	38
3	West Coast Fever	14	9	0	5	994	900	110.44	36
4	Melbourne Vixens	14	8	0	6	883	858	102.91	32
5	Sunshine Coast Lightning	14	6	0	8	862	863	99.88	24
6	Giants Netball	14	5	0	9	851	887	95.94	20
7	Queensland Firebirds	14	4	0	10	883	970	91.03	16
8	Collingwood Magpies	14	4	0	10	820	911	90.01	16
Last updated: Sunday 18 June 2023 — Source

== Finals Series ==
=== Major Semi Final ===
Saturday 24 June; 7:00pm AEST	Report; Stats	New South Wales Swifts (1)	62–64	Adelaide Thunderbirds (2)	ET	Qudos Bank Arena; Umpires: Tara Warner, Rachael Ayre; Reserve umpire: Nathan Begley	Foxtel
Saturday 24 June; 7:00pm AEST	Report; Stats	Scoring by quarter: 16-11, 12-15, 16-13, 14-19, ET: 4-6			ET	Qudos Bank Arena; Umpires: Tara Warner, Rachael Ayre; Reserve umpire: Nathan Begley	Foxtel
Saturday 24 June; 7:00pm AEST	Report; Stats	Scoring by half: 28-26, 30-32 ET: 4-6			ET	Qudos Bank Arena; Umpires: Tara Warner, Rachael Ayre; Reserve umpire: Nathan Begley	Foxtel
Saturday 24 June; 7:00pm AEST	Report; Stats	2 Goal Shots; Helen Housby 8/10 (80%); Romelda Aiken-George 1/2 (50%); Sophie Fawns 0/2 (0%); 1 Goal Shots; Romelda Aiken-George 29/36 (81%); Helen Housby 15/18 (83%)		2 Goal Shots; Eleanor Cardwell 6/8 (75%); Lucy Austin 5/6 (83%); Tippah Dwan 0/1 (0%); 1 Goal Shots; Eleanor Cardwell 18/20 (90%); Lucy Austin 13/14 (93%); Tippah Dwan 11/16 (69%)	ET	Qudos Bank Arena; Umpires: Tara Warner, Rachael Ayre; Reserve umpire: Nathan Begley	Foxtel

=== Minor Semi Final ===
Sunday 25 June; 2:00pm AWST	Report; Stats	West Coast Fever (3)	64–57	Melbourne Vixens (4)	RAC Arena; Umpires: Jemma Cook, Josh Bowring; Reserve umpire: Bronwen Adams	Foxtel
Sunday 25 June; 2:00pm AWST	Report; Stats	Scoring by quarter: 15-14, 17-16, 16-14, 16-13			RAC Arena; Umpires: Jemma Cook, Josh Bowring; Reserve umpire: Bronwen Adams	Foxtel
Sunday 25 June; 2:00pm AWST	Report; Stats	Scoring by half: 32-30, 32-27			RAC Arena; Umpires: Jemma Cook, Josh Bowring; Reserve umpire: Bronwen Adams	Foxtel
Sunday 25 June; 2:00pm AWST	Report; Stats	2 Goal Shots; Sasha Glasgow 3/7 (43%); Jhaniele Fowler 0/1 (0%); 1 Goal Shots; Jhaniele Fowler 55/56 (98%); Sasha Glasgow 3/4 (75%)		2 Goal Shots; Kiera Austin 3/8 (38%); Mwai Kumwenda 0/2 (0%); 1 Goal Shots; Mwai Kumwenda 39/40 (98%); Kiera Austin 12/14 (86%)	RAC Arena; Umpires: Jemma Cook, Josh Bowring; Reserve umpire: Bronwen Adams	Foxtel

=== Preliminary Final ===
Saturday 1 July; 7:00pm AEST	Report; Stats	New South Wales Swifts (1)	65–64	West Coast Fever (3)	Qudos Bank Arena; Attendance: 9,437; Umpires: Josh Bowring, Jemma Cook; Reserve umpire: Rachael Ayre	Foxtel
Saturday 1 July; 7:00pm AEST	Report; Stats	Scoring by quarter: 15-19, 18-16, 13-16, 19-13			Qudos Bank Arena; Attendance: 9,437; Umpires: Josh Bowring, Jemma Cook; Reserve umpire: Rachael Ayre	Foxtel
Saturday 1 July; 7:00pm AEST	Report; Stats	Scoring by half: 33-35, 32-29			Qudos Bank Arena; Attendance: 9,437; Umpires: Josh Bowring, Jemma Cook; Reserve umpire: Rachael Ayre	Foxtel
Saturday 1 July; 7:00pm AEST	Report; Stats	2 Goal Shots; Sophie Fawns 7/11 (64%); Helen Housby 3/9 (33%); 1 Goal Shots; Romelda Aiken-George 25/26 (96%); Helen Housby 19/19 (100%); Sophie Fawns 1/2 (50%)		2 Goal Shots; Jhaniele Fowler 1/2 (50%); Sasha Glasgow 1/2 (50%); Emma Cosh 0/1 (0%); 1 Goal Shots; Jhaniele Fowler 53/54 (98%); Sasha Glasgow 7/9 (78%)	Qudos Bank Arena; Attendance: 9,437; Umpires: Josh Bowring, Jemma Cook; Reserve umpire: Rachael Ayre	Foxtel

=== Grand Final ===
Saturday 8 July; 7:00pm AEST	Report; Stats	Adelaide Thunderbirds (2)	60–59	New South Wales Swifts (1)	ET	John Cain Arena; Attendance: 9,622; Umpires: Josh Bowring, Jemma Cook; Reserve umpire: Rachael Ayre	Foxtel
Saturday 8 July; 7:00pm AEST	Report; Stats	Scoring by quarter: 16-12, 19-15, 8-13, 11-14, ET: 6-5			ET	John Cain Arena; Attendance: 9,622; Umpires: Josh Bowring, Jemma Cook; Reserve umpire: Rachael Ayre	Foxtel
Saturday 8 July; 7:00pm AEST	Report; Stats	Scoring by half: 35-27, 19-27 ET: 6-5			ET	John Cain Arena; Attendance: 9,622; Umpires: Josh Bowring, Jemma Cook; Reserve umpire: Rachael Ayre	Foxtel
Saturday 8 July; 7:00pm AEST	Report; Stats	2 Goal Shots; Eleanor Cardwell 5/6 (83%); 1 Goal Shots; Eleanor Cardwell 31/33 (94%); Tippah Dwan 12/13 (92%); Lucy Austin 7/9 (78%)		2 Goal Shots; Helen Housby 8/10 (80%); Sophie Fawns 1/4 (25%); 1 Goal Shots; Romelda Aiken-George 27/32 (84%); Helen Housby 12/13 (92%); Sophie Fawns 2/2 (100%)	ET	John Cain Arena; Attendance: 9,622; Umpires: Josh Bowring, Jemma Cook; Reserve umpire: Rachael Ayre	Foxtel
Saturday 8 July; 7:00pm AEST	Report; Stats	Grand Final MVP: Eleanor Cardwell			ET	John Cain Arena; Attendance: 9,622; Umpires: Josh Bowring, Jemma Cook; Reserve umpire: Rachael Ayre	Foxtel

== Nissan Net Points Team of the Round ==
Round	GS	GA	WA	C	WD	GD	GK
Round 1	C. Koenen (SCL)	S. Wood (SCL)	A. Teague-Neeld (WCF)	J. Price (GIA)	L. Wilson (ADE)	J. Ward (MAG)	S. Sterling (ADE)
Round 2	J. Fowler (WCF)	S. Wood (SCL)	A. Teague-Neeld (WCF)	J. Price (GIA)	J. Anstiss (WCF)	J. Ward (MAG)	R. Bakewell Doran (FIR)
Round 3	E. Cardwell (ADE)	H. Housby (NSW)	A. Teague-Neeld (WCF)	M. Proud (NSW)	J. Anstiss (WCF)	K. Pretorius (SCL)	C. Bruce (WCF)
Round 4	C. Koenen (SCL)	S. Wood (SCL)	A. Teague-Neeld (WCF)	J. Price (GIA)	A. Parmenter (GIA)	J. Ward (MAG)	S. Sterling (ADE)
Round 5	J. Fowler (WCF)	H. Housby (NSW)	K. Browne (MAG)	J. Price (GIA)	A. Parmenter (GIA)	M. Garrett (ADE)	S. Sterling (ADE)
Round 6	R. Aiken-George (NSW)	K. Austin (VIX)	L. Watson (VIX)	M. Proud (NSW)	L. Wilson (ADE)	K. Pretorius (SCL)	S. Sterling (ADE)
Round 7	J. Fowler (WCF)	S. Wood (SCL)	P. Hadley (NSW)	L. Watson (VIX)	J. Anstiss (WCF)	R. Bakewell Doran (FIR)	G. Mentor (MAG)
Round 8	M. Kumwenda (VIX)	K. Austin (VIX)	A. Teague-Neeld (WCF)	M. Proud (NSW)	K. Eddy (VIX)	R. Bakewell Doran (FIR)	S. Sterling (ADE)
Round 9	J. Fowler (WCF)	H. Housby (NSW)	M. Hay (GIA)	J. Price (GIA)	L. Wilson (ADE)	M. Garrett (ADE)	S. Sterling (ADE)
Round 10	J. Fowler (WCF)	S. Glasgow (WCF)	A. Teague-Neeld (WCF)	P. Hadley (NSW)	A. Parmenter (GIA)	J. Weston (VIX)	E. Mannix (VIX)
Round 11	S. Nelson (MAG)	H. Housby (NSW)	L. Dunkley (FIR)	J. Price (GIA)	T. Fraser (NSW)	R. Bakewell Doran (FIR)	R. Kamo (FIR)
Round 12	D. Wallam (FIR)	H. Housby (NSW)	H. Mundy (VIX)	M. Cassidy (SCL)	K. Moloney (VIX)	J. Ward (MAG)	R. Kamo (FIR)
Round 13	R. Aiken-George (NSW)	H. Housby (NSW)	M. Hay (GIA)	M. Proud (NSW)	L. Wilson (ADE)	S. Aryang (WCF)	C. Bruce (WCF)
Round 14	C. Koenen (SCL)	S. Garbin (MAG)	M. Hay (GIA)	M. Proud (NSW)	J. Anstiss (WCF)	L. Wilson (ADE)	S. Sterling (ADE)

== Awards ==
The following players, coaches and umpires were awarded by Netball Australia for performances in the 2023 season:

- The Player of the Year Award was won by Shamera Sterling of the Adelaide Thunderbirds.
- The Grand Final MVP Award was won by Eleanor Cardwell of the Adelaide Thunderbirds.
- The Rising Star Award was won by Lucy Austin of the Adelaide Thunderbirds.
- The Joyce Brown Coach of the Year award was won by Stacey Marinkovich of the Australian Diamonds.
- The Lorna McConchie Umpire of the Year award was won by Josh Bowring of Victoria.
- The Leading Goalscorer Award was won by Jhaniele Fowler of the West Coast Fever, who scored 768 points in the regular season.
- The following players were named in the Super Netball Team of the Year:

Attackers

- Goal Shooter: Donnell Wallam
  (Queensland Firebirds)
- Goal Attack: Helen Housby
  (New South Wales Swifts)

Midcourters

- Wing Attack: Paige Hadley
  (New South Wales Swifts)
- Centre: Jamie-Lee Price
  (Giants Netball)
- Wing Defence: Latanya Wilson
  (Adelaide Thunderbirds)

Defenders

- Goal Defence: Jodi-Ann Ward
  (Collingwood Magpies)
- Goal Keeper: Shamera Sterling
  (Adelaide Thunderbirds)

Reserves

- Attack Reserve: Steph Fretwell
  (Sunshine Coast Lightning)
- Midcourt Reserve: Liz Watson
  (Melbourne Vixens)
- Defence Reserve: Courtney Bruce
  (West Coast Fever)
