= Immanuel College, Adelaide =

Lutheran school in Adelaide, Australia

Coordinates: 34.9711°S 138.5352°E

Immanuel College
- Motto: Latin: Plus Ultra
- Motto in English: Ever Higher
- Type: Independent, Lutheran, co-educational, day and boarding
- Established: 1895; 131 years ago
- Affiliations: Sports Association for Adelaide Schools; Independent Girls Schools Sports Association
- Religious affiliation: Lutheran Church of Australia
- Principal: John Thompson
- Faculty: 92 (2009)
- Administrative staff: 168 (2009)
- Students: 1473 (7–12)
- Location: Novar Gardens, Adelaide, South Australia, Australia
- Campus: Suburban
- Colours: Blue, gold and white
- Website: www.immanuel.sa.edu.au

Immanuel College is a Lutheran school in Novar Gardens, Adelaide, South Australia – a co-educational day and boarding school from Year 7 to 12. Established in 1895, the college is a school of the Lutheran Church of Australia. It is the only Lutheran college in Adelaide that has boarders. Its sister schools include Johann-Sebastian-Bach-Gymnasium in Windsbach, Germany and Kyushu Lutheran College in Kumamoto, Japan.

== History ==
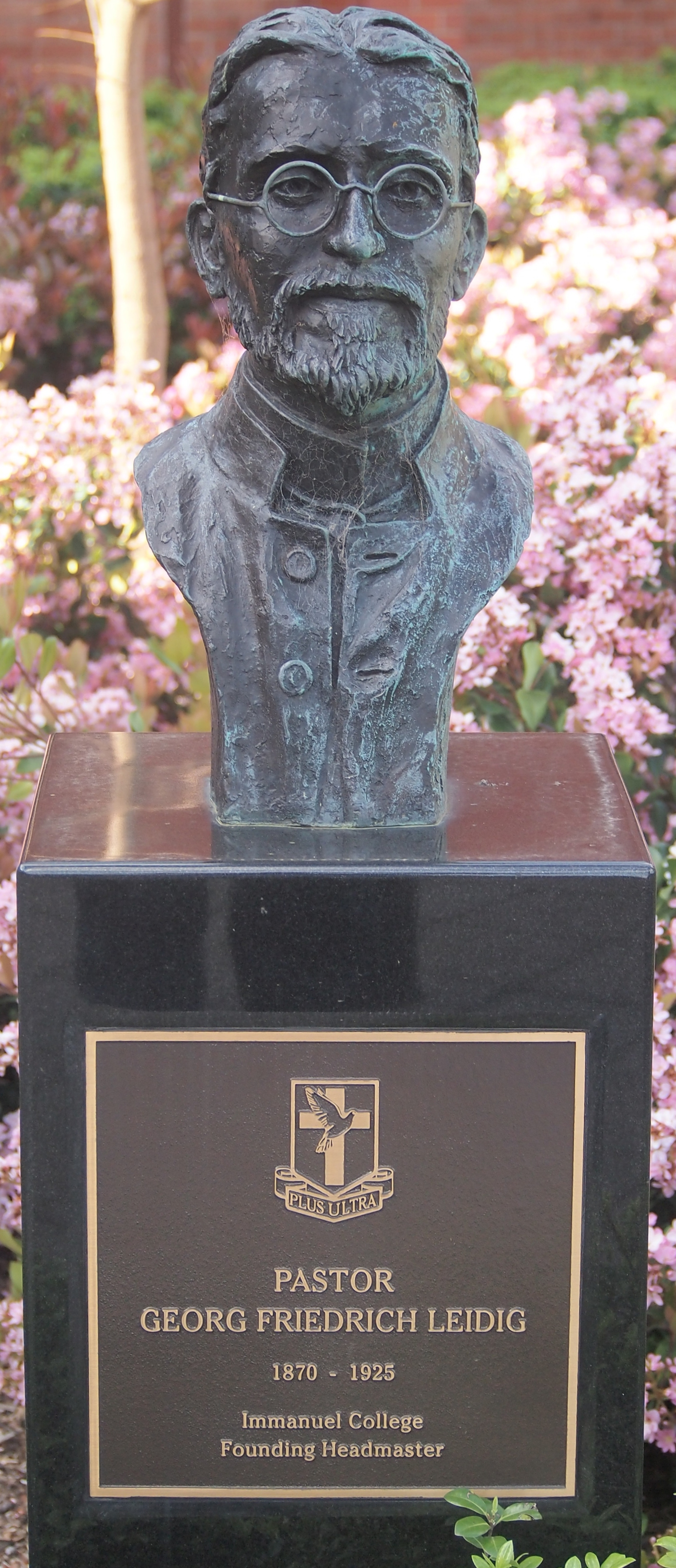
Georg Friedrich Leidig, founder of Immanuel College

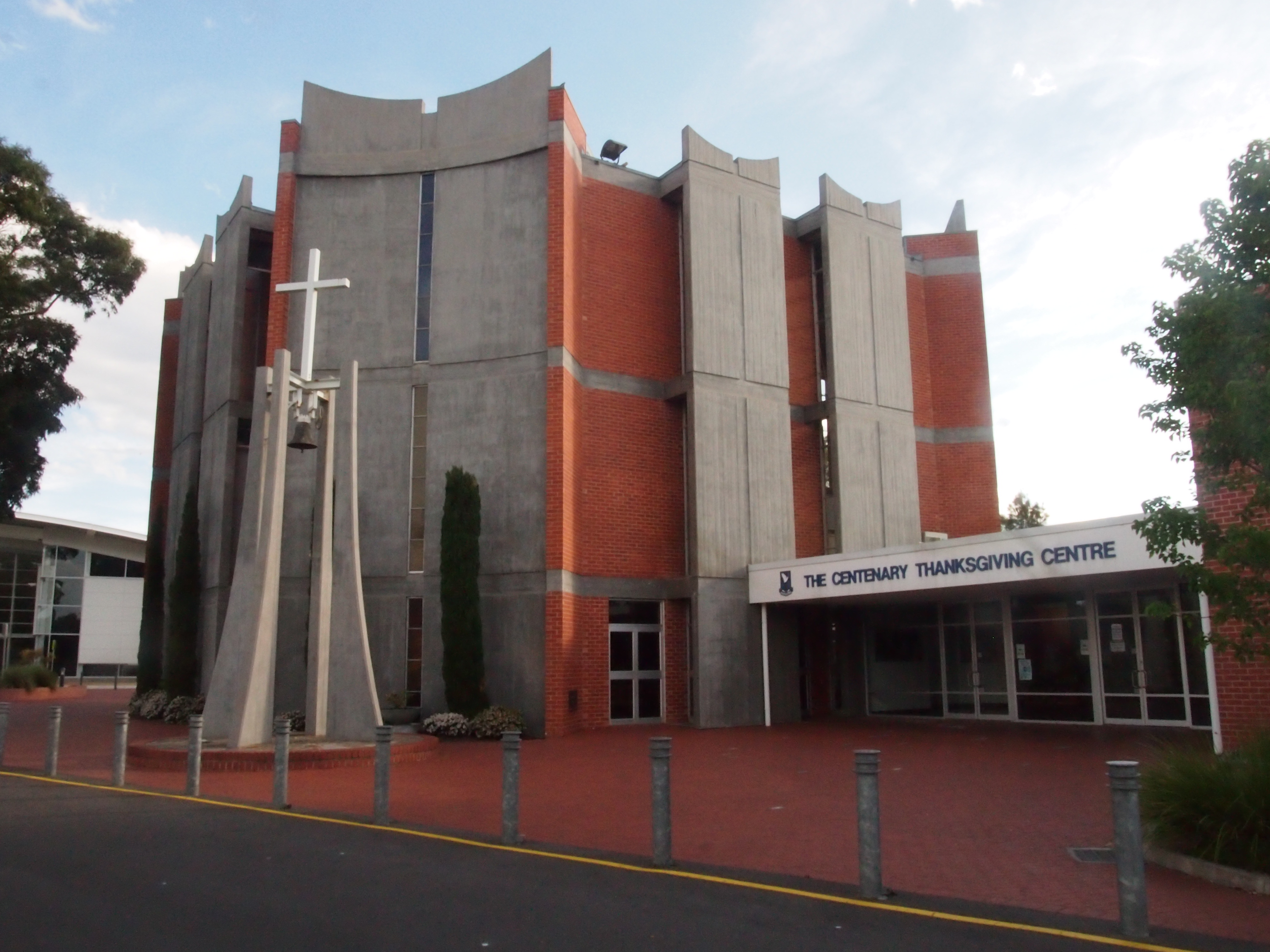
Immanuel College chapel

Immanuel College was founded by Pastor Georg Leidig in 1895 at Point Pass (north of Eudunda, east of the Clare Valley), before its subsequent move to North Adelaide in 1921.

During WWII, the buildings were required by the air force, and the college was forced to temporarily move to North Walkerville for the period 1942–1946. Pastor Leidig's eldest son Paul taught there from 1950 until 1956. In 1949, land at Novar Gardens was acquired from the Morphett family property 'Cummins', and the school was eventually established there in 1957.

Cummins House was sold to the state government in 1977, and Immanuel College leased that property for five years from 1982 to 1987.

== Sport ==
Immanuel College is a member of the Sports Association for Adelaide Schools (SAAS), and the Independent Girls Schools Sports Association (IGSSA).

=== Sports centre ===
To celebrate the 50th anniversary of its Novar Gardens campus, Immanuel College upgraded the school gymnasium. The sports centre includes a heated 25-metre 10-lane indoor swimming pool, a heated 15-metre by 6-metre hydrotherapy and learners pool, 3 indoor courts and a dance studio. A primary school oval was converted into the indoor basketball courts, and an existing auditorium and a new dance classroom were integrated into the new centre. Completed in 2008, the centre operates as an educational facility during the day, and as a community sports centre after hours.

=== IGSSA premierships ===
Immanuel College has won the following IGSSA premierships.

- Athletics (4) – 2009, 2010, 2015, 2021
- Badminton (3) – 1995, 2016, 2017
- Basketball (16) – 1995, 1998, 1999, 2004, 2005, 2006, 2008, 2010, 2014, 2015, 2016, 2017, 2018, 2019, 2020, 2021
- Football (2) — 2017, 2018
- Netball (13) – 1998, 1999, 2006, 2007, 2010, 2012, 2013, 2014, 2015, 2016, 2017, 2018, 2021
- Soccer (5) – 2009, 2010, 2011, 2012, 2013
- Swimming (4) – 2011, 2012, 2014, 2015
- Tennis (2) – 2020, 2021
- Volleyball (3) – 1998, 2000, 2004

=== Basketball Team Achievements ===
==== Championship Women (Open) ====
- Australian Schools Championships

(silver) Runners Up: 2018, 2024
(bronze) Third Place: 2022

== The Margaret Ames Centre ==
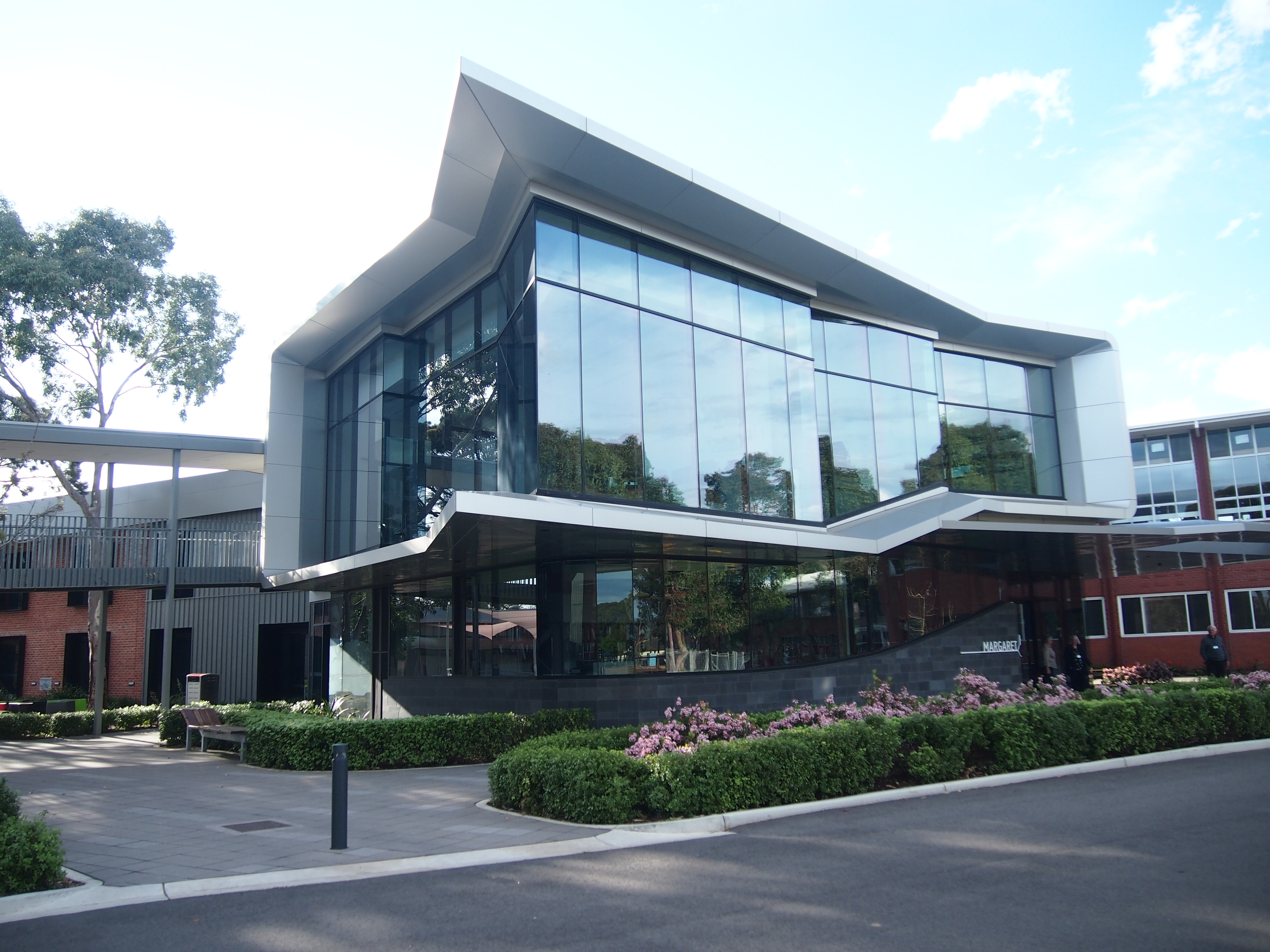
The Margaret Ames Centre

The Margaret Ames Centre, named after an old scholar and ex-teacher, was opened in 2015 as the senior school for students in Years 10, 11 and 12. It includes classrooms, study areas, a cafe called "Wings Cafe" (based on the Immanuel logo of a dove), and a university style theatre called "The Otto Theatre". It has library access and has 2 floors. It is a modern looking building unattached from the old style of the middle school. The Margaret Ames Centre cost $14.9m AUD at the time of construction.

== The Discovery Centre ==
The Discovery Centre, named after the Year 10 course 'Discovery' was opened in May 2023 as a building primarily for the use of Year 10 students. The building is two stories and contains ten classrooms, two staff office spaces, two sound proof study spaces, upstairs study cubicles, a downstairs collaborative study space, two downstairs presentation areas, a green screen room, and a podcasting room. It is connected to the Margaret Ames Centre through an upstairs bridge, which also links it to the Library, Middle School, Art Centre and Music Practice Rooms. Year 10 lockers surround the Discovery Centre on the southern and western sides. The building continues the modern style of the Margaret Ames Centre. The building cost approximately $13.5 million. The Discovery Centre was specifically designed to house the new 'Discovery Year' of Year 10 at Immanuel. The Discovery Program began in 2023 with a host of different elective subjects that offer more creative and expression-based experiences, such as 'The Joy of Painting', 'Podcasting', 'The Edit: Filmmaking'. As well as newer, innovative subjects such as 'On The Money', 'Beyond the Sidelines: The Art of Coaching', and 'Agribusiness'. The new Discovery course is focused on self-expression and self improvement.

== Boarding ==
Immanuel has a long history of boarding, commencing with its inception as an exclusively boarding school at Point Pass in 1895. In the 21st century, Immanuel has boarding facilities for both males and females. In 2019 the college has beds for 170 students, accommodation is in a main double storey building, self-contained units and eight fully equipped houses. The houses are named after the word for "Peace" in various languages – Heiwa, Pengon, Tangokorro, Frieden, Shalom, Koinonia, Sama and Rahu.

== House System ==
Immanuel's current house system has been in place since 1975. There are a total of ten houses which all compete for the Paterson Shield (named after former principal R.G. Paterson). Houses earn points throughout the year by participating in the Swimming Carnival, Athletics Carnival, Team Sports Day, Battle of the Bands, Debating, the House Chess Competition and student grades. New students are randomly assigned a house and following family members can choose to be assigned to that house.

House	Paterson Shield Wins	Years won
Andrews Angels	10	1979, 1982, 1983, 1989, 1996, 1997, 1999, 2000, 2003, 2012
Camden Tigers	3	1975, 1992, 1993
Dohler Kangaroos	0	
Hawker Hawks	7	1976, 1978, 1980, 1995, 1998, 2013, 2014
Jeffcott Jaguars	8	1985, 1986, 2001, 2018, 2019, 2020, 2021, 2022
Kavel Crocodiles	9	1981, 2002, 2004, 2007, 2008, 2009, 2011, 2015, 2017
Leidig Dragons	7	1984, 1987, 1990, 1991, 1994, 2024, 2025
Lohe Lions	5	1977, 1988, 2005, 2006, 2014
Morphett Monsters	1	2016
Whinham Wildcats	3	2010, 2023, 2026

== Notable alumni ==
=== Arts and media ===
- Tom Jay Williams – Singer, entertainer, music executive
- Alex Carapetis – musician, professional drummer
- Niki Vasilakis – violinist
- Will Goodings - journalist, news presenter
- Warren H Williams (born 1963) – musician

=== Business ===
- Martin Albrecht – former CEO Thiess Pty Ltd.
- Peter Lehman – winemaker

=== Politicians ===
- Karl Hampton – former Member of NT Legislative Council. CEO Central Australia Aboriginal Media Association
- Condor Laucke – former President of the Australian Senate. former Lieutenant Governor or South Australia
- Steven Marshall – 46th Premier of South Australia
- Bronwyn Pike – former Victorian Minister. Chair of the Board Uniting Care Australia.
- Berthold Teusner – former SA House of Assembly Member; former Speaker of the SA House of Assembly.
- Matt Williams

=== Sports ===
- Curtis Mead- baseball
- Leigh Hoffmann - cyclist
- Cameron Borgas and Jason Borgas – Cricketers
- Kyle Chalmers, swimmer – Olympic Gold medalist
- Emma Checker – soccer player
- Curtly Hampton – footballer
- Isabel Hodgson – soccer player
- Lleyton Hewitt – tennis player
- Georgie Horjus- Netballer
- Sarah Klau – netballer
- Cody Lange – netballer
- Don Lindner – footballer
- Kieran Modra – Paralympian Cyclist, Swimmer and Athlete – multiple medal winner
- Tania Modra – Paralympic tandem cycling pilot and gold medallist – Kieran's sister
- Brad Ottens – footballer
- Maisie Nankivell – netballer/footballer
- Lauren Nourse – netballer
- Hannah Petty – netballer
- Anna Rawson – golfer
- Shaun Rehn – footballer
- Matthew Scharenberg – footballer
- Billy Stretch – footballer
- Luke Partington – footballer, 2019 Magarey Medalist
- Laura and Natalie von Bertouch – netballers
- Samuel Von Einem – Paralympian table tennis player
- Jenny Williams – Australian sportsperson, lacrosse and football
- Mark and Stephen Williams – footballers

== See also ==
- List of schools in South Australia
- List of boarding schools in Australia
- List of Lutheran schools in Australia
