= Super Netball Player of the Year Award =

Australian netball award

The Super Netball Player of the Year Award or SSN Player of the Year is an annual Super Netball award recognising the person considered to be the best netballer in each season of the competition. The current holder of the award is Elmeré van der Berg, who is the first player to have won the award in their first season playing in the league (or equivalent).

Unlike similar awards in rival codes, where umpires are responsible for voting for a player, the SSN Player of the Year is voted on by the players, coaches and high-performance staff of the competition.

== Winners ==
Season	Player	Nationality	Team	Ref.
2017	Geva Mentor	England	Sunshine Coast Lightning	
2018	Jhaniele Fowler	Jamaica	West Coast Fever	
2019	Jhaniele Fowler (2)	Jamaica	West Coast Fever (2)	
2020	Jhaniele Fowler (3)	Jamaica	West Coast Fever (3)	
2021	Jhaniele Fowler (4)	Jamaica	West Coast Fever (4)	
2022	Jhaniele Fowler (5)	Jamaica	West Coast Fever (5)	
2023	Shamera Sterling	Jamaica	Adelaide Thunderbirds	
2024	Georgie Horjus	Australia	Adelaide Thunderbirds (2)	
2025	Jhaniele Fowler-Nembhard (6)	Jamaica	West Coast Fever (6)	
2026	Elmeré van der Berg	South Africa	Adelaide Thunderbirds (3)	
