= Tippah Dwan =

Australian netball player

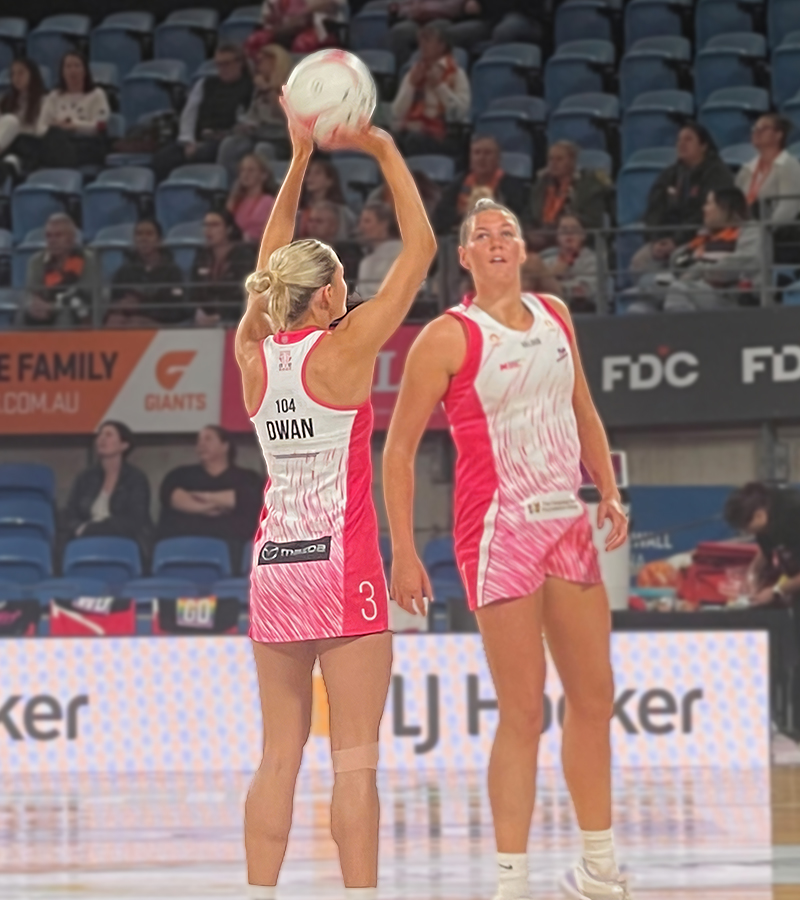
- Tippah Dwan warming up with Thunderbirds shooting partner Lucy Austin

Personal information
- Born: Toowoomba, Queensland
- Height: 1.78 m (5 ft 10 in)
- School: Australian International School Singapore; Somerville House
- University: Queensland University of Technology

Netball career
- Playing position: GA
Years	Club team	Apps
2019-2021	Queensland Firebirds	
2022-2023	Adelaide Thunderbirds	
2024-2025	Queensland Firebirds	
Years	National team	Caps
2023	Australian Diamonds	
Medal record
Representing Australia
Fast5 Netball World Series
Gold medal – first place	2023 Christchurch	Netball

Tippah Dwan is a professional Australian netball player.

Dwan was signed by the Queensland Firebirds in the Suncorp Super Netball league ahead of the 2019 season, after spending two years in the extended training squad for the team. Born in Toowoomba in South East Queensland, Dwan was raised in several cities; Brisbane, Adelaide, Sydney, Shanghai and Singapore. She attended Brisbane school Somerville House as a boarding student, having previously attended Australian International School Singapore and Dulwich College Shanghai. As an emerging netballer, Dwan captained the Queensland Under 19 team that traveled to the National Championships in Adelaide in 2018. She also was selected to represent Australia in under 17 and 19 age groups. She made appearances for the Firebirds in all the pre-season games however an unfortunate foot injury prevented her from making her debut during the regular season. She was re-signed as an extended squad member of the 2020 Firebirds team, though was elevated to the senior team as a replacement for the pregnant vice-captain Gretel Bueta.

In August 2021, Dwan was named in the 2021/22 Australian Development squad, one level below the Australian Diamonds.

In September 2021, it was announced that Dwan and fellow player Rudi Ellis would both depart the Firebirds at the end of the month for other clubs. Later the same month, the Adelaide Thunderbirds announced they had signed Dwan for the 2022 Super Netball season. She played for the Thunderbirds for the 2022 and 2023 seasons, winning the premiership in 2023, before departing to be closer to family in Brisbane.

Dwan earned her first call-up to the Australian National Team in October 2023, being named in the squad for the Fast5 Netball World Series on the back of her performance in the 2023 Super Netball season. The Australian team would go on to win the final 35–23 against New Zealand.

On 15 December 2023, it was announced that Dwan had re-signed with her former team the Queensland Firebirds for two years ahead of the 2024 Super Netball season.

In 2020, Dwan was introduced to then‑Western Bulldogs midfielder Josh Dunkley through his sister, netballer Lara Dunkley. They have maintained a high‑profile presence across the AFL and Super Netball communities, frequently noted for supporting each other's careers during interstate moves and competitive seasons. The couple announced their engagement on 1 January 2026, sharing the news on social media.
