= Mandy Edwards =

Australian netball player (born 1982)

Personal information
- Born: 28 July 1982 (age 44)
- Occupation: Teacher
- Height: 1.84 m (6 ft 0 in)
- School: Westminster School

Netball career
- Playing positions: WD, GD, GK
Years	Club team	Apps
2008	Adelaide Thunderbirds	
- Updated on 2009-03-13

Mandy Edwards (born 28 July 1982) is an Australian netball player. In 2008, Edwards was signed to play in the ANZ Championship for the Adelaide Thunderbirds. Edwards was educated at Westminster School in Adelaide.
