= Emily Beaton =

Australian netball player

Personal information
- Born: 9 April 1987 (age 39)
- Occupation: Receptionist
- Height: 1.80 m (5 ft 11 in)

Netball career
- Playing positions: C, WA
Years	Club team	Apps
2008–2016	Adelaide Thunderbirds	
Medal record
World Netball Series
Bronze medal – third place	2011 Liverpool	Fastnet
- Updated on 25 February 2023

Emily Beaton (born 9 April 1987) is an Australian former netball player.

== Netball career ==
Beaton played in the ANZ Championship for the Adelaide Thunderbirds, winning premierships in 2010 and 2013. She retired at the end of the 2016 season as the only remaining member of the Thunderbirds team from the inaugural ANZ Championship season in 2008.

Beaton was the starting WA for the Australian Diamonds squad that played in the 2011 World Netball Series tournament in Liverpool.

== Personal life ==
Beaton is the daughter of Cathy and David, and has a brother Jason and a sister Joey.

As of December 2023, Beaton's partner is country football player, Joshua Ingall.

In December 2023, Beaton began working as a weekend weather presenter for 7NEWS Adelaide.
