= Adelaide Thunderbirds =

Australian netball team

- Founded: 1997
- Based in: Adelaide
- Regions: South Australia
- Home venue: Adelaide Entertainment Centre
- Head coach: Tania Obst
- Asst coach: Cathy Fellows
- Co-captains: Georgie Horjus & Shamera Sterling-Humphrey
- Premierships: 7 (1998, 1999, 2010, 2013, 2023, 2024, 2026)
- League: Super Netball; ANZ Championship (2008-2016); Commonwealth Bank Trophy (1997-2007)
- 2026 placing: 1st
- Website: adelaidethunderbirds.com.au
Playing dress	Alternate (heritage)

Adelaide Thunderbirds are an Australian professional netball team based in Adelaide, South Australia. Since 2017 they have played in Super Netball. Between 2008 and 2016, they played in the ANZ Championship and between 1997 and 2007, they played in the Commonwealth Bank Trophy league. Thunderbirds have won seven premierships. They won their first two premierships in 1998 and 1999 during the Commonwealth Bank Trophy era, their third and fourth in 2010 and 2013 during ANZ Championship era, and their fifth and sixth back to back in 2023, 2024, then won again in 2026 during the Super Netball era, claiming their seventh title. After winning the Grand Final three out of four years they became the first team to win three Suncorp Super Netball championships. Historically, Thunderbirds are one of Australia's most successful netball teams. Between 1997 and 2010 they finished in the top three of every regular season, and are the first and only team to win a Trophy at all 3 eras.

== History ==
=== Commonwealth Bank Trophy ===
Between 1997 and 2007, Adelaide Thunderbirds played in the Commonwealth Bank Trophy league. Together with Adelaide Ravens, Melbourne Kestrels, Melbourne Phoenix, Perth Orioles, Queensland Firebirds, Sydney Sandpipers and Sydney Swifts, Thunderbirds were one of the founding members of the league. Thunderbirds were initially going to be named Adelaide Falcons but the name was changed at the request of the rugby union team. Adelaide Thunderbirds and Adelaide Ravens represented Netball South Australia and each team was assigned four state league clubs to select players from. Thunderbirds were aligned with Cheerio, Contax, Matrics and Oakdale. With a team coached by former Contax head coach, Margaret Angove and a starting seven featuring Rebecca Sanders, Kathryn Harby-Williams, Jacqui Delaney, Sarah Sutter, Peta Squire, Cassie Mogg and Alex Hodge, Thunderbirds won their first two premierships and grand finals in 1998 and 1999.

Regular season statistics
Season	Position	Won	Drawn	Lost
1997	2nd	9	0	3
1998	1st	11	1	2
1999	1st	11	1	2
2000	1st	12	0	2
2001	1st	12	0	2
2002	2nd	12	0	2
2003	3rd	10	0	4
2004	2nd	12	0	2
2005	3rd	12	0	2
2006	2nd	11	0	3
2007	3rd	8	0	6

Premierships
Runners Up

=== ANZ Championship ===
Between 2008 and 2016, Thunderbirds played in the ANZ Championship. Natalie von Bertouch became the inaugural ANZ Championship Thunderbirds captain. She subsequently captained Thunderbirds to two ANZ Championship titles. In 2010, after finishing second during the regular season, they defeated the minor premiers, New South Wales Swifts, in the major semi-final and Waikato Bay of Plenty Magic in the grand final. In 2013, Natalie von Bertouch captained Thunderbirds to their fourth premiership after they defeated Queensland Firebirds in the grand final.

Regular season statistics
Season	Position	Won	Drawn	Lost
2008	3rd	9	0	4
2009	3rd	10	0	3
2010	2nd	9	0	4
2011	6th	5	0	8
2012	4th	9	0	4
2013	1st	12	0	1
2014	8th	5	0	8
2015	7th	4	0	7
2016	10th	2	0	11

Premierships
Runners Up

=== Super Netball ===
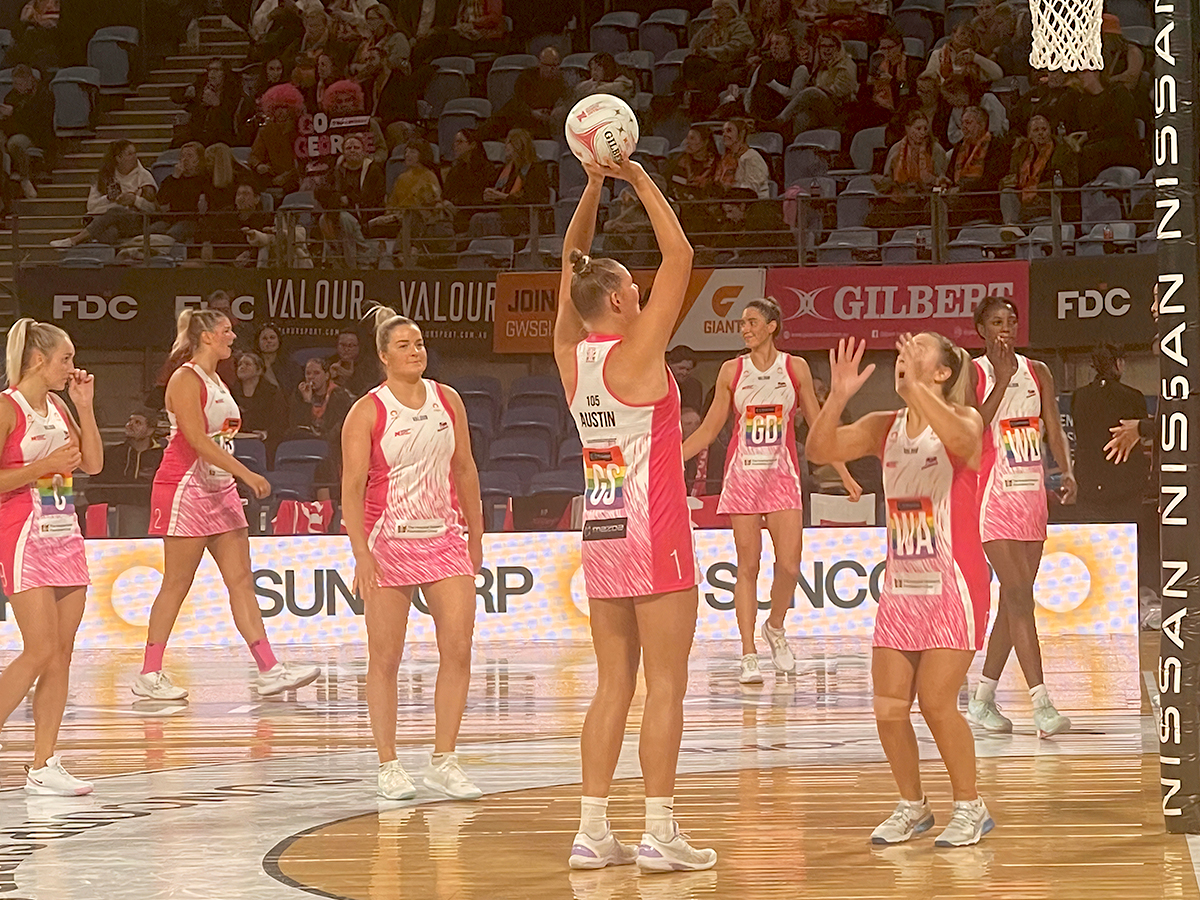
Adelaide Thunderbirds players warm up in clash against the Giants during the 2023 Suncorp Super Netball season.

Since 2017, Thunderbirds have played in Super Netball. They had initially struggled to find success in the competition, not making finals or finishing higher than seventh place until 2023, where they won their first grand final. In 2024, they won a second consecutive title, but their attempt at a threepeat in 2025 was quashed by the eventual premiers, the Melbourne Vixens in the Minor Semi-Final. In 2026, the Thunderbirds won the minor premiership by winning thirteen of their fourteen regular season games, which had never been achieved by any previous team in the Super Netball era. They completed the near-perfect season by winning the premiership against the Melbourne Vixens.

Regular season statistics
Season	Position	Won	Drawn	Lost
2017	8th	1	0	13
2018	8th	0	0	14
2019	7th	3	2	9
2020	7th	5	0	9
2021	7th	5	0	9
2022	7th	5	0	9
2023	2nd	9	1	4
2024	1st	11	0	3
2025	3rd	8	0	6
2026	1st	13	0	1

Premierships
Runners Up

== Grand finals ==
Commonwealth Bank Trophy

Season	Winners	Score	Runners up	Venue
1997	Melbourne Phoenix	58–48	Adelaide Thunderbirds	The Glasshouse
1998	Adelaide Thunderbirds	48–42	Sydney Swifts	ETSA Park
1999	Adelaide Thunderbirds	62–30	Adelaide Ravens	ETSA Park
2000	Melbourne Phoenix	52–51	Adelaide Thunderbirds	The Glasshouse
2001	Sydney Swifts	57–32	Adelaide Thunderbirds	State Sports Centre
2002	Melbourne Phoenix	49–44	Adelaide Thunderbirds	Vodafone Arena
2006	Sydney Swifts	65–36	Adelaide Thunderbirds	Sydney Olympic Park Sports Centre

ANZ Championship

Season	Winners	Score	Runners up	Venue
2009	Melbourne Vixens	54–46	Adelaide Thunderbirds	Hisense Arena
2010	Adelaide Thunderbirds	52–42	Waikato Bay of Plenty Magic	Adelaide Entertainment Centre
2013	Adelaide Thunderbirds	50–48	Queensland Firebirds	Adelaide Entertainment Centre

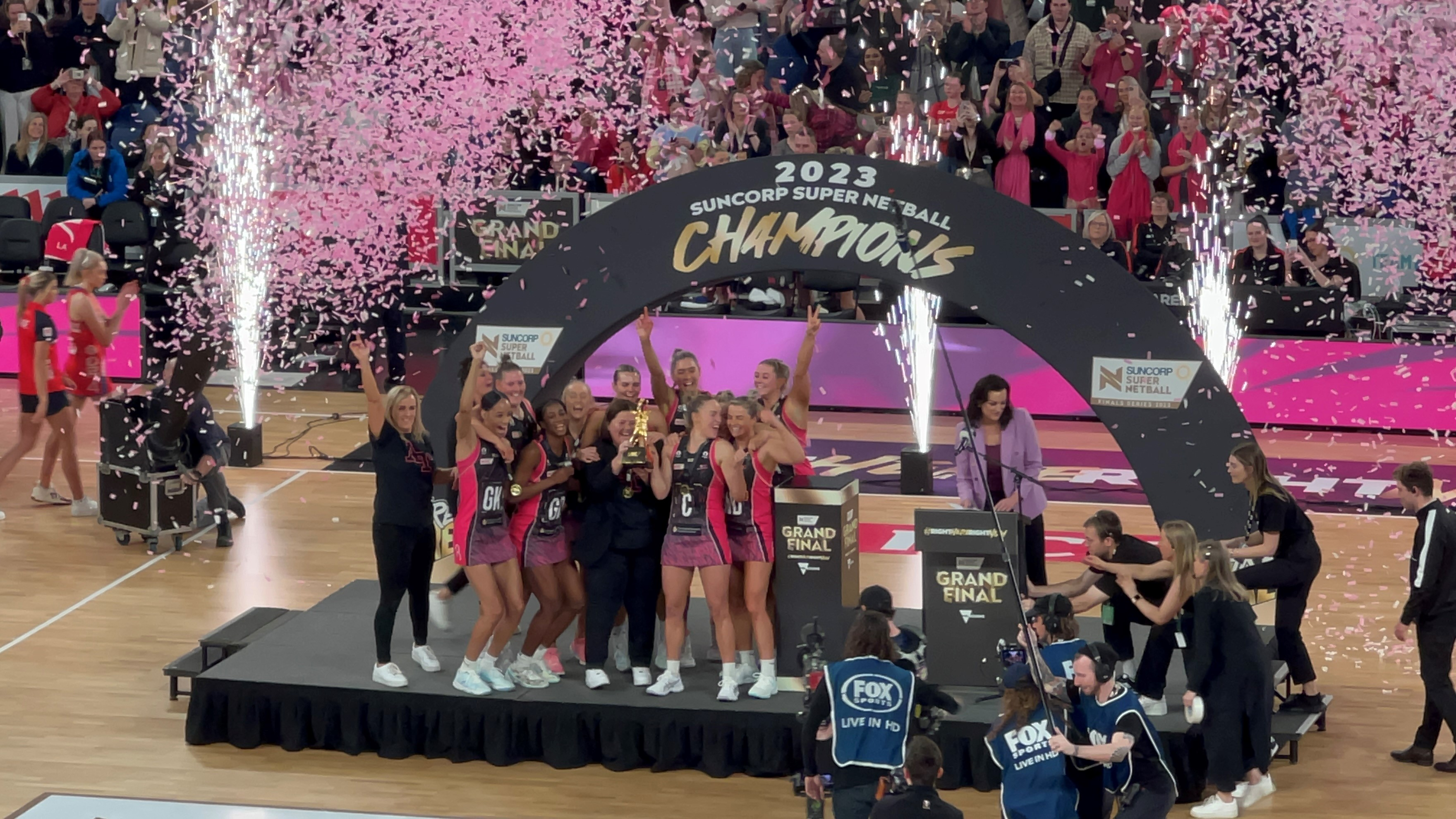
Thunderbirds players celebrating with the trophy after winning the 2023 Super Netball Grand Final.

Super Netball

Season	Winners	Score	Runners up	Venue
2023	Adelaide Thunderbirds	60–59	New South Wales Swifts	John Cain Arena
2024	Adelaide Thunderbirds	59–57	Melbourne Vixens	Adelaide Entertainment Centre
2026	Adelaide Thunderbirds	61–40	Melbourne Vixens	John Cain Arena

== Home venues ==
As of 2024, all Thunderbirds home games are played at the Adelaide Entertainment Centre. The team has historically played the majority of their home games at the Netball SA Stadium as well as occasionally staging home games at the Adelaide Arena and a one-off home match at Darwin's Territory Netball Stadium in Round 7, 2019.

The club's administrative and training base is temporarily located at Adelaide Arena in Findon until the end of 2027, due to the redevelopment of Netball SA Stadium. The club is also temporarily utilising the facilities at the South Australian Sports Institute in Mile End.

== Team colours ==
During the Commonwealth Bank Trophy era, Thunderbirds main colour was silver. Between 2008 and 2010, when Thundersbirds were sponsored by Port Adelaide Football Club, they adopted their sponsors team colours of black, white, teal and silver. Ahead of the 2011 season, Thunderbirds announced they were changing their team colours to pink, black and white.

== Notable players ==
=== 2027 squad ===
2027 Adelaide Thunderbirds roster
Players
Coaching staff

Nat.	Name	Position(s)	DoB	Height
(Australia)	Sophie Casey	WD, C	30 April 2004 (age 22)	1.79 m (5 ft 10 in)
(Australia)	Lauren Frew	GA, GS	12 December 2001 (age 24)	1.87 m (6 ft 2 in)
(Australia)	Kayla Graham	GA, WA, GS	24 May 2004 (age 22)	1.82 m (6 ft 0 in)
(New Zealand)	Kate Heffernan	C, WD	7 October 1999 (age 27)	1.81 m (5 ft 11 in)
(Australia)	Georgie Horjus	WA, GA	28 January 2002 (age 24)	1.72 m (5 ft 8 in)
(Australia)	Jazmin McKay	WD, GD	26 February 2008 (age 18)	1.80 m (5 ft 11 in)
(Jamaica)	Shamera Sterling-Humphrey	GK, GD	21 October 1995 (age 31)	1.9 m (6 ft 3 in)
(South Africa)	Elmeré van der Berg	GS, GA	9 April 2001 (age 25)	1.91 m (6 ft 3 in)
(South Africa)	Sanmarie Visser	WD, GD	23 October 2003 (age 23)	1.84 m (6 ft 0 in)
(Jamaica)	Latanya Wilson	GD, WD, GK	11 October 2000 (age 26)	1.88 m (6 ft 2 in)

Head coach

- (Australia) Tania Obst

Assistant coaches

- (Australia) Cathy Fellows

Notes

- (c) – Captain
- (cc) – Co-captain
- (vc) – Vice-captain
- – Injury / maternity leave
- (TRP) – Temporary Replacement Player
Player profiles: Team website
Last updated: 28 September 2026

=== Internationals ===
Australia

- Jane Altschwager
- Natalie Avellino
- Erin Bell
- Laura von Bertouch
- Natalie von Bertouch
- Kate Beveridge
- Rebecca Bulley
- Alex Clarke
- Jacqui Delaney
- Matilda Garrett
- Mo'onia Gerrard
- Kathryn Harby-Williams
- Kristen Heinrich
- Alexandra Hodge
- Georgie Horjus
- Renae Ingles
- Sarah Klau
- Rebecca Larkin
- Sharni Layton
- Demelza McCloud
- Natalie Medhurst
- Maddy Proud
- Chelsea Pitman
- Laura Scherian
- Peta Scholz
- Amy Steel
- Sarah Sutter

England

- Ama Agbeze
- Eleanor Cardwell
- Jade Clarke
- Beth Cobden
- Sasha Glasgow
- Layla Guscoth
- Geva Mentor
- Tracey Neville
- Chelsea Pitman
- Kate Shimmin
- Eboni Usoro-Brown

Jamaica

- Romelda Aiken-George
- Carla Borrego
- Malysha Kelly
- Shimona Nelson
- Shamera Sterling-Humphrey
- Latanya Wilson

New Zealand

- Leana de Bruin
- Maria Folau
- Kate Heffernan
- Cathrine Tuivaiti

Samoa

- Cathrine Tuivaiti

Scotland

- Fiona Themann

South Africa

- Leana de Bruin
- Bongiwe Msomi
- Lenize Potgieter
- Elmeré van der Berg
- Shadine van der Merwe
- Sanmarie Visser

=== Captains ===
Name	Years
Kathryn Harby-Williams	1997–2003
Peta Scholz	2004–2006 (co-captain)
Laura von Bertouch	2004–2006 (co-captain); 2007 (sole captain)
Natalie von Bertouch	2008–2009, 2011-2013 (sole captain); 2010 (co-captain)
Mo'onia Gerrard	2010 (co-captain)
Renae Ingles	2014–2015
Erin Bell	2016–2017
Leana de Bruin	2018
Chelsea Pitman	2019–2020 (co-captain)
Layla Guscoth	2019 (co-captain)
Hannah Petty	2020 (co-captain); 2021–2025 (sole captain)
Georgie Horjus	2026–present (co-captain)
Shamera Sterling-Humphrey	2026–present (co-captain)

== Club Award winners ==
Club Champion

Season	Winner
2010	Natalie von Bertouch
2011	Natalie von Bertouch (2)
2012	Rebecca Bulley
2013	Carla Borrego
2014	Erin Bell
2015	Carla Borrego (2)
2016	Maddy Proud
2017	Chelsea Pitman
2018	Kate Shimmin
2019	Maria Folau
2020	Shamera Sterling; Maisie Nankivell
2021	Georgie Horjus
2022	Shamera Sterling (2)
2023	Shamera Sterling (3)
2024	Latanya Wilson
2025	Latanya Wilson (2)
2026	Latanya Wilson (3)

Players' Player

Season	Player
2010	Natalie von Bertouch
2011	Natalie von Bertouch
2012	Rebecca Bulley
2013	Natalie von Bertouch
2014	Rebecca Bulley
2015	Leigh Waddington
2016	Emily Beaton
2017	Ama Agbeze
2018	Kate Shimmin
2019	Layla Guscoth
2020	Chelsea Pitman
2021	Shadine van der Merwe
2022	Shamera Sterling
2023	Latanya Wilson
2024	Georgie Horjus
2025	Latanya Wilson
2026	Georgie Horjus

Members' Player of the Year

Season	Player
2014	Renae Hallinan
2015	Renae Ingles
2016	Kristina Brice
2017	Renae Ingles
2018	Kate Shimmin
2019	Shamera Sterling
2020	Chelsea Pitman
2021	Maisie Nankivell
2022	Shamera Sterling
2023	Georgie Horjus
2024	Georgie Horjus
2025	Latanya Wilson
2026	Georgie Horjus

Tanya Denver Medal

Season	Player
2010	Natalie von Bertouch
2011	Natalie von Bertouch
2012	Rebecca Bulley
2013	Renae Hallinan
2014	Renae Hallinan
2015	Eboni Beckford-Chambers
2016	Kate Shimmin
2017	Sasha Glasgow
2018	Kate Shimmin
2019	Shamera Sterling

Spirit Award

Season	Player
2018	Bongiwe Msomi
2019	Hannah Petty
2020	Shadine van der Merwe
2021	Hannah Petty
2022	Hannah Petty
2023	Eleanor Cardwell
2024	Tayla Williams
2025	Tayla Williams
2026	Tayla Williams

== Competition Award winners ==
Commonwealth Bank Trophy MVP

Season	Player
1999	Jacqui Delaney
2001	Jacqui Delaney

Super Netball Player of the Year

Season	Player
2023	Shamera Sterling
2024	Georgie Horjus
2026	Elmeré van der Berg

ANZ Championship Australian Player of the Year

Season	Player
2009	Natalie von Bertouch
2010	Natalie von Bertouch
2013	Erin Bell

Commonwealth Bank Trophy Players' Player

Season	Player
2001	Jacqui Delaney

Commonwealth Bank Trophy Best New Talent

Season	Player
2002	Mandy Edwards

ANZ Championship Best New Talent

Season	Player
2010	Sharni Layton
2016	Kristina Brice

Super Netball Rookie of the Year

Season	Player
2020	Maisie Nankivell
2023	Lucy Austin
2024	Lauren Frew
2025	Sophie Casey

ANZ Championship Leading Goalscorer

Season	Player
2010	Carla Borrego

Super Netball Leading Goalscorer Award

Season	Player
2026	Elmeré van der Berg

Commonwealth Bank Trophy Grand Final MVP

Season	Player
1998	Sarah Sutter
1999	Jacqui Delaney

ANZ Championship Grand Final MVP

Season	Player
2010	Geva Mentor
2013	Erin Bell

Super Netball Grand Final MVP

Season	Player
2023	Eleanor Cardwell
2024	Romelda Aiken-George
2026	Latanya Wilson

Commonwealth Bank Trophy Margaret Pewtress Team of the Year

Season	Player	Position
2002	Laura von Bertouch	WA
2002	Rebecca Sanders	C
2002	Peta Squire	WD
2002	Kathryn Harby-Williams	GD
2003	Rebecca Sanders	C
2003	Peta Scholz	WD
2004	Laura von Bertouch	WA
2004	Peta Scholz	WD
2005	Laura von Bertouch	WA
2005	Natalie von Bertouch	C
2006	Laura von Bertouch	WA
2006	Natalie von Bertouch	C
2007	Laura von Bertouch	WA
2007	Natalie von Bertouch	C
2007	Peta Scholz	WD

ANZ Championship All Star Team

Season	Player	Position
2011	Emily Beaton	WA
2011	Natalie von Bertouch	C
2013	Erin Bell	GA
2013	Renae Hallinan	WD
2013	Jane Woodlands-Thompson	Coach
2014	Renae Hallinan	WD

Super Netball Team of the Year

Season	Player	Position
2019	Shamera Sterling	Reserve
2020	Shamera Sterling	Reserve
2021	Shamera Sterling	Reserve
2022	Latanya Wilson	GD
2022	Shamera Sterling	GK
2023	Latanya Wilson	WD
2023	Shamera Sterling	GK
2024	Georgie Horjus	WA
2024	Latanya Wilson	WD
2024	Shamera Sterling-Humphrey	GK
2025	Latanya Wilson	GD
2026	Elmeré van der Berg	GS
2026	Georgie Horjus	WA
2026	Latanya Wilson	WD
2026	Shamera Sterling-Humphrey	GK
2026	Kate Heffernan	Reserve

Australian Netball Players' Association (ANPA) Awards

Season	Player	Award
2025	Tayla Williams	Heart of the Game
2026	Elmeré van der Berg	Attacker of the Year
2026	Kate Heffernan	Midcourter of the Year
2026	Kate Heffernan	International Player of the Year

== Head coaches ==
Name	Years
Margaret Angove	1997–2006
Tania Obst	2007
Jane Woodlands-Thompson	2008–2015
Michelle den Dekker	2016
Kristy Keppich-Birrell	2016
Dan Ryan	2017–2018
Tania Obst	2019–present

ANZ Championship Australian Coach of the Year

Season	Coach
2010	Jane Woodlands-Thompson
2013	Jane Woodlands-Thompson

Joyce Brown Coach of the Year

Season	Coach
2024	Tania Obst
2026	Tania Obst

== Adelaide Thunderbirds Futures ==
The reserve team of the Adelaide Thunderbirds is known as the Thunderbirds Futures, and previously played as the Southern Force. This team currently plays in the Super Netball Reserves competition, which began in 2024, after rebranding from the Australian Netball Championships and prior to that, the Australian Netball League. The team has won two premierships, the ANL in 2012 and the ANC in 2022.

== Premierships ==
- Commonwealth Bank Trophy
  - Winners: 1998, 1999
  - Runners Up: 1997, 2000, 2001, 2002, 2006
  - Minor Premiership: 1998, 1999, 2000, 2001
- ANZ Championship
  - Winners: 2010, 2013
  - Runners Up: 2009
  - Minor Premiership: 2013
- Super Netball
  - Winners: 2023, 2024, 2026
  - Minor Premiership: 2024, 2026
- Super Netball Reserves / Australian Netball Championships / Australian Netball League
  - Winners: 2012, 2022
  - Runners Up: 2015
