= Shamera Sterling =

Jamaican netball player (born 1995)

Shamera Sterling-Humphrey
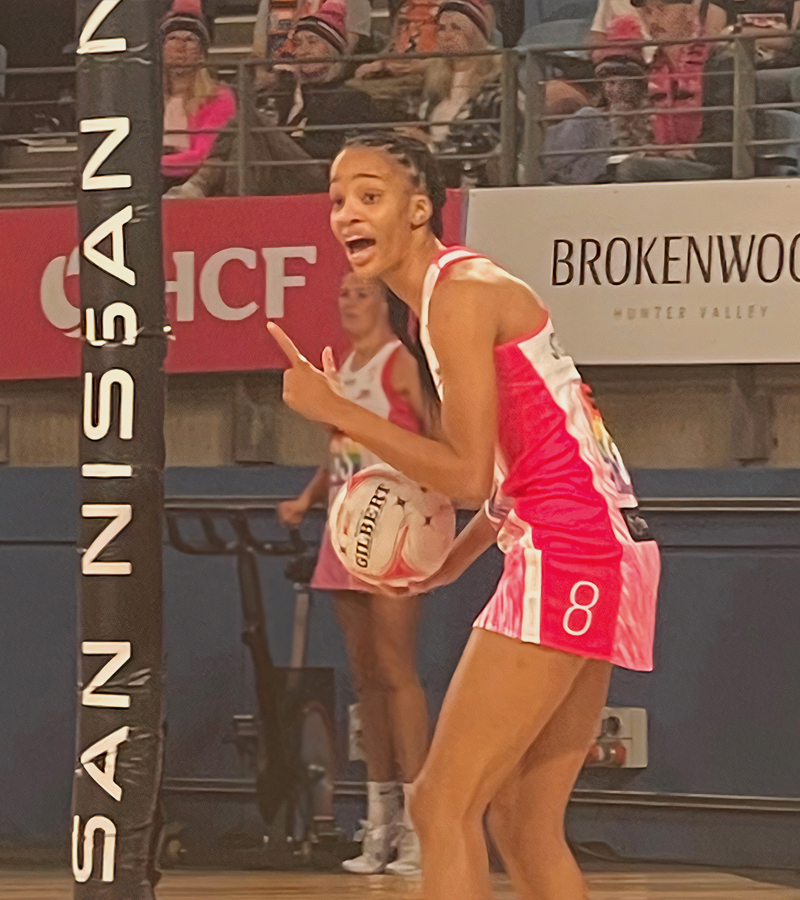
- Sterling defending for the Adelaide Thunderbirds in 2023

Personal information
- Born: 21 October 1995 (age 30) Saint James Parish, Jamaica
- Height: 190 cm (6 ft 3 in)
- University: University of the West Indies

Netball career
- Playing positions: GK, GD
Years	Club team	Apps
2018	Loughborough Lightning	
2019–present	Adelaide Thunderbirds	
Years	National team	Caps
2016–present	Jamaica	
Medal record
Netball
Representing Jamaica
Commonwealth Games
Silver medal – second place	2022 Birmingham	Netball
Silver medal – second place	2026 Glasgow	Netball
Bronze medal – third place	2018 Gold Coast	Netball
Netball World Cup
Bronze medal – third place	2023 Cape Town	Netball
- Updated on July 2024

Shamera Sterling-Humphrey (born Shamera Sterling, 21 October 1995) is a Jamaican netball player. She plays for Adelaide Thunderbirds in Suncorp Super Netball and was named Suncorp Super Netball Player of the Year in 2023.

== Early life and education ==
Sterling grew up in Jamaica and describes how netball was an escape for her when her father was in prison. Her junior club was Naldi Knights. She studied primary education and attended the University of the West Indies, as did her husband.

== Club career ==
=== Loughborough Lightning ===
Sterling played for Loughborough Lightning in the Netball Super League in 2018, winning the Player of the Season and Players' Player awards.

=== Adelaide Thunderbirds ===
She moved to the Adelaide Thunderbirds in the Australian Super Netball league in the 2019 season. In 2023, Sterling led the Thunderbirds to the club's first premiership in a decade, and her first. She was selected for the Club Champion Award and named Suncorp Super Netball Player of the Year, having led the league with 118 deflections. The Thunderbirds won a second and third premiership in 2024 and 2026.

== International career ==
Sterling was part of the Jamaican squad that won bronze at the 2018 Commonwealth Games. At the 2022 Commonwealth Games Sterling was part of the squad that won their first ever silver medal, losing to Australia the finals. The Sunshine Girls had defeated New Zealand in the semi-final and also defeated Australia for the first time in a Commonwealth Games match during the group stage. Sterling would go on to win a second Commonwealth silver medal at the 2026 Commonwealth Games when Jamaica defeated Australia in the semi-final, meaning Australia were absent from the final for the first time in history. The Sunshine Girls were defeated by New Zealand in the final.

She was also part of the 2023 Bronze medal-winning team at the World Cup in Cape Town.

== Personal life ==
She married her long-time partner, Andrew Humphrey in Montego Bay, Jamaica in December 2023.

== Honours ==
=== Jamaica ===
- Commonwealth Games: Silver: 2022, 2026 Bronze: 2018
- Netball World Cup: Bronze: 2023

=== Adelaide Thunderbirds ===
- Super Netball: 2023, 2024, 2026
