= Romelda Aiken-George =

Jamaican netball player (born 1988)

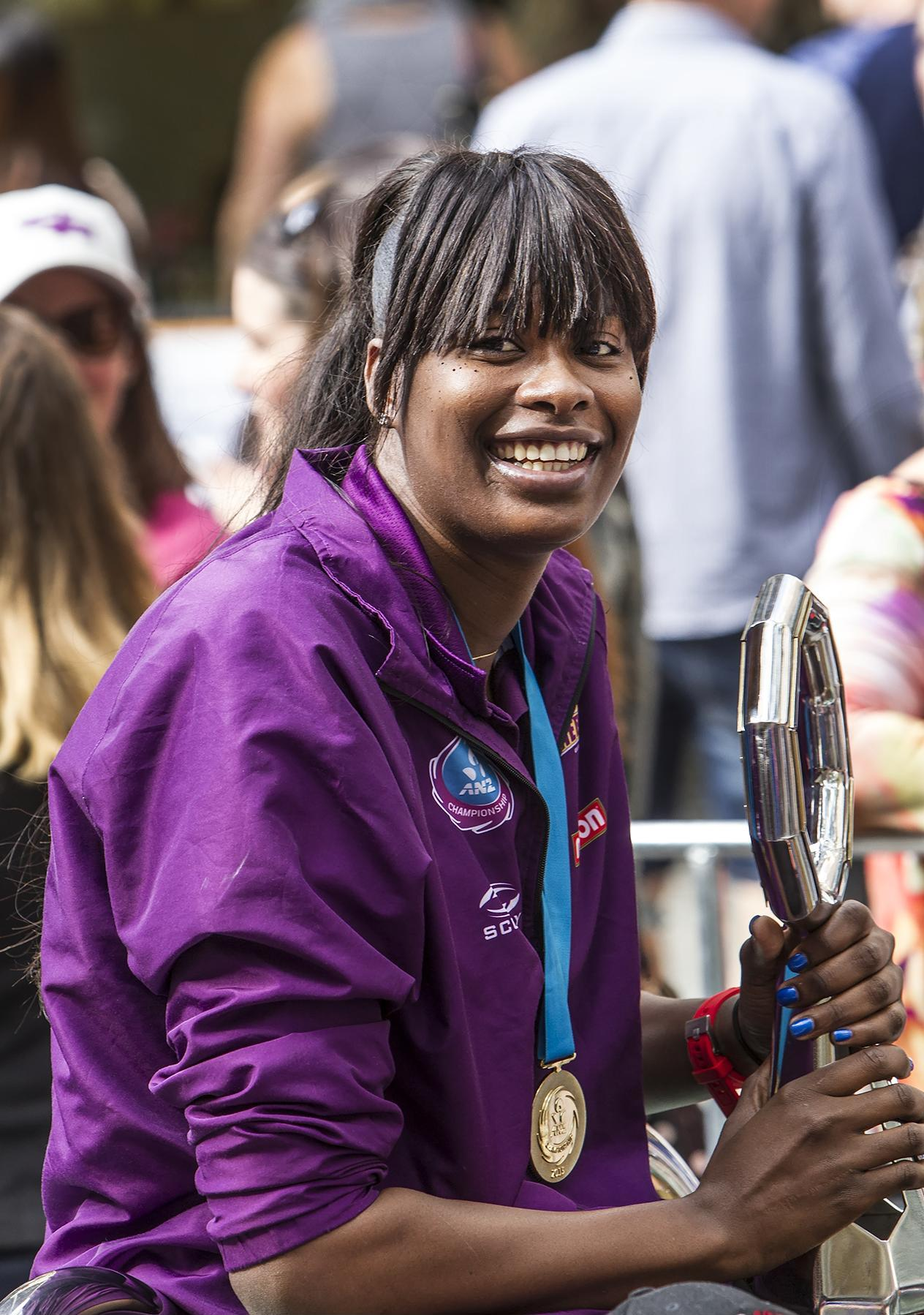
- Aiken-George in 2015

Personal information
- Full name: Romelda Antonette Aiken-George
- Born: Romelda Antonette Aiken; 19 November 1988 (age 37)
- Height: 1.96 m (6 ft 5 in)
- Spouse: Daniel George (m. 2021)
- Relative: Nicole Pinnock (sister)

Netball career
- Playing positions: GS, GA
2008–2022	Queensland Firebirds	197
2023	New South Wales Swifts	17
2024-2025	Adelaide Thunderbirds	31
2026	West Coast Fever	9
Years	National team	Caps
2005–present	Jamaica	
Medal record
Representing Jamaica
Netball World Cup
Bronze medal – third place	2007 Auckland	Netball
Bronze medal – third place	2023 Cape Town	Netball
Commonwealth Games
Silver medal – second place	2026 Glasgow	Netball
Bronze medal – third place	2014 Glasgow	Netball
Bronze medal – third place	2018 Gold Coast	Netball
World Netball Series
Silver medal – second place	2009 Manchester	Fastnet

Romelda Aiken-George (née Aiken}; born 19 November 1988) is a Jamaican netball player. Aiken debuted for the Jamaica national team in 2005 as a replacement for regular shooter Elaine Davis. The 1.96 metres (6 ft 5 in) shooter rose to international prominence during the 2007 Netball World Championships. In 2008, Aiken signed with the Queensland Firebirds to play in the ANZ Championship in Australia and New Zealand.

In May 2026, Romelda overtook the 15 year old record of 254 national league games held by Catherine Cox to become the person to play the most top level netball games in Australia. Despite losing the match to one of her former teams, the NSW Swifts, both her current and former team gave her a guard of honour as she celebrated her 255th national league game.

== Playing career ==
=== Queensland Firebirds ===
Former Australian captain Liz Ellis has predicted that "if she [Aiken] can keep this up for a long time she will undoubtedly be one of the best [players] ever." In 2014, she became the first player to score 3500 goals in the ANZ Championship. She has won the MVP award twice, in 2008 & 2009. She also played a major role in leading the Queensland Firebirds to three premierships across her career to date. The unique 2020 Suncorp Super Netball season was notable for Aiken, where she finished first in the league for offensive rebounds (110) and second for goals scored (583).

=== New South Wales Swifts ===
After 14 seasons with the Queensland Firebirds, she was signed as a training partner with the New South Wales Swifts for the 2023 Suncorp Super Netball season as a replacement for injured goal shooter Sam Wallace. At the end of the 2023 season, Aiken-George departed the Swifts after 17 appearances in the red dress.

=== Adelaide Thunderbirds ===
Aiken-George departed the Swifts at the conclusion of the 2023 Suncorp Super Netball season and signed with the Adelaide Thunderbirds, for the 2024 Suncorp Super Netball Season. Aiken-George was part of the Thunderbirds premiership winning side in 2024, scored 42 goals from 51 attempts in the 2024 grand final. She was also named the grand final MVP for her stellar performance and helped the Thunderbirds secure back-to-back Suncorp Super Netball titles, for the first time since the Sunshine Coast Lightning won two titles consecutively between 2017-2018. In August 2024, Aiken-George re-signed with the Thunderbirds for the 2025 Suncorp Super Netball season. During the 2025 Suncorp Super Netball Season, Aiken-George passed Geva Mentor's previous record of 232 national league appearances across both the ANZ Championship and the Suncorp Super Netball in the Round 3 match between the New South Wales Swifts and the Adelaide Thunderbirds, in which Aiken-George played her 233rd national league match.

=== West Coast Fever ===
In December 2025, after news that her former national teammate Jhaniele Fowler-Nembhard was pregnant and would miss the 2026 Suncorp Super Netball season, Aiken-George's retirement plans were put on hold as she signed to play for the West Coast Fever.

== Personal life ==
Off the court, Aiken-George has completed a course in both hairdressing and IT, but has favoured her passion for coaching in recent years. In September 2021, after the conclusion of the 2021 Suncorp Super Netball season, Aiken-George married former professional basketballer Daniel George. They have one daughter, Gianna.

== Grand final appearances ==
#	Year	Finish	Team	Opponent
1	2011	Winner	Queensland Firebirds	Northern Mystics
2	2013	Runner up	Queensland Firebirds	Adelaide Thunderbirds
3	2014	Runner up	Queensland Firebirds	Melbourne Vixens
4	2015	Winner	Queensland Firebirds	New South Wales Swifts
5	2016	Winner	Queensland Firebirds	New South Wales Swifts
6	2023	Runner up	New South Wales Swifts	Adelaide Thunderbirds
7	2024	Winner	Adelaide Thunderbirds	Melbourne Vixens

Awards
New creation	ANZ Championship Official MVP; 2008 (with Sonia Mkoloma), 2009	Succeeded by Liana Leota
