= Maisie Nankivell =

Australian rules footballer (born 1999)

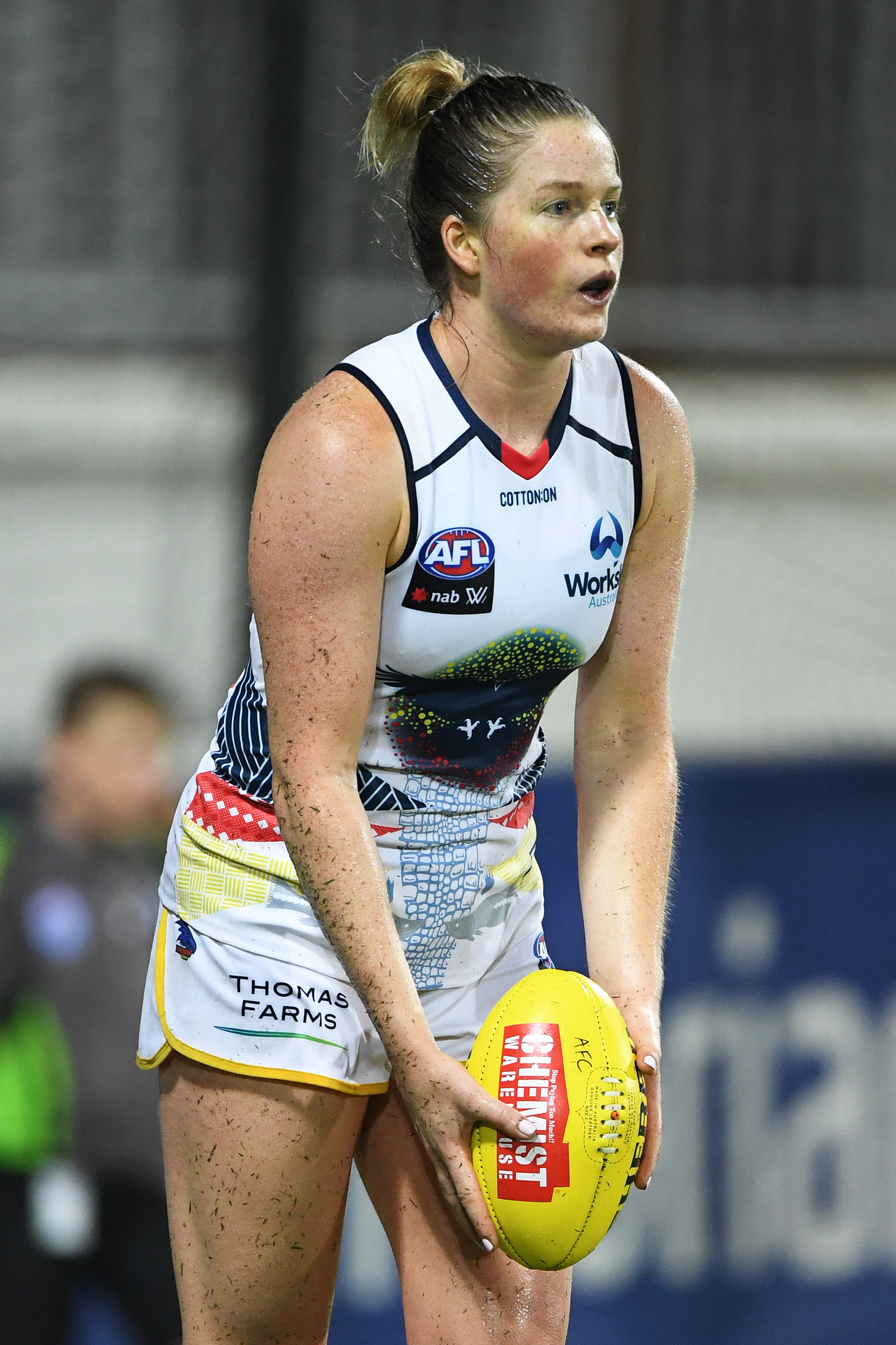
- Nankivell playing for Adelaide in January 2019

Personal information
- Born: 29 September 1999 (age 27)
- Draft: 2018 rookie signing
- Debut: Round 1, 2019, Adelaide vs. Western Bulldogs, at Norwood Oval
- Height: 176 cm (5 ft 9 in)

Club information
- Current club: Collingwood
- Number: 5

Playing career^{1}
Years	Club	Games (Goals)
2019–2020	Adelaide	2 (0)
2026–	Collingwood	1 (0)
Total		3 (0)
- ^{1} Playing statistics correct to the end of round 2, 2026.

Maisie Nankivell (born 29 September 1999) is a dual sport athlete, who plays netball for the Melbourne Mavericks in the Suncorp Super Netball and plays Australian rules football for Collingwood in the AFL Women's (AFLW). She has previously played football for Adelaide in the AFLW.

== AFLW career ==
Nankivell was drafted by Adelaide as a rookie signing in 2018. She made her AFLW football debut in the one point loss to the Western Bulldogs at Norwood Oval in the opening round of the 2019 season. Following a full-time contract offer from Adelaide Thunderbirds, Nankivell withdrew from Adelaide's squad to focus full-time on netball and was placed on the inactive list. In August 2020, she retired from football.

In November 2025, Nankivell returned to football, joining Collingwood on a two-year rookie contract.

== Netball career ==
In 2019, Nankivell was a training partner with the Adelaide Thunderbirds and was elevated into the team and debut against Collingwood in the wing defence position. Her performance saw her play a total of 7 games with the Thunderbirds and was then offered full-time contract with the Adelaide Thunderbirds for the following 2020 season. From 2024, Nankivell will be playing for Melbourne Mavericks.
