= Nicole Richardson =

Australian softball player

Medal record

Representing Australia

Women's Softball

Olympic Games
Bronze medal – third place	1996 Atlanta	Team

Netball

Commonwealth Games
Gold medal – first place	2002 Manchester	Team

Nicole Richardson (born 26 June 1970) is an Australian former netball and softball player and current netball coach.

As a softballer, Richardson won a bronze medal for Australia at the 1996 Summer Olympics. She also represented Australia in netball, winning gold at the 2002 Commonwealth Games. Richardson played both centre and wing defence. She played seven seasons with the Melbourne Kestrels in the Commonwealth Bank Trophy. She was captain of the team from 2000 until 2003. She retired from netball in 2003. Since retiring from netball, Richardson has forged a distinctive coaching career. She coached Victorian representative teams at under 17, under 19 and under 21 levels, before becoming head coach of the Netball Australia Centre for Excellence team. During the mid-to-late 2010's, she was assistant coach at Super Netball teams West Coast Fever and Collingwood Magpies, and in 2021 she was appointed head coach of the Magpies.
