= Hannah Petty =

Australian netball player

Personal information
- Born: 17 May 1997 (age 29) Wudinna, South Australia
- Height: 1.77 m (5 ft 10 in)
- School: Wudinna Area School; Immanuel College

Netball career
- Playing positions: C, WA, WD
Years	Club team	Apps
2016–2025	Adelaide Thunderbirds	
- Updated on 28/07/25

Hannah Petty (born 17 May 1997) is a retired Australian netball player and former dual-premiership captain of the Adelaide Thunderbirds.

Petty began playing for the Thunderbirds in 2016 and has played for the South Australian-based team ever since. During her development, Petty was part of the South Australian Sport Institute Netball Program and was a member of the 2017 Under-21 Australian team. She was appointed co-captain of the Thunderbirds for the 2020 season, sharing the role with English netballer Chelsea Pitman. She went on to captain the team for 6 years, winning back-to-back premierships in 2023 and 2024. After 10 years with the club, and 110 appearances across both the ANZ Championship and Suncorp Super Netball, she played her final game with the Adelaide Thunderbirds in the 2025 minor semi-final. She also sits on the board of the Australian Netball Players’ Association.
