= Matilda Garrett =

Australian netball player

Personal information
- Born: 11 August 1998 (age 27) Melbourne, Victoria
- Height: 1.85 m (6 ft 1 in)
- School: Rowville Secondary College

Netball career
- Playing positions: GK, GD
Years	Club team	Apps
2018–2020	Collingwood Magpies	
2021 – present	Adelaide Thunderbirds	
Years	National team	Caps
2023 – present	Australian Diamonds	

Matilda Garrett (born 11 August 1998) is an Australian netball player in the Suncorp Super Netball league, playing for the Adelaide Thunderbirds.

== Career ==
Garrett was selected by the Magpies prior to the start of the 2018 season having previously represented Australia at under 21 level and captained her native state of Victoria at under 19 level. Before being picked by Collingwood, Garrett was on the club's training list in 2017 and enjoyed a breakout season with Tasmanian Magpies in the Australian Netball League . Garrett grew up playing netball in the suburb of Narre Warren South.

Garrett finished the 2020 season with the Collingwood Magpies and was then informed she would not receive a contract for the 2021 season. Adelaide Thunderbirds then signed Matilda for 2021.

Debuted for the Australian Diamonds (Player 191) in Cairns against South Africa on 25 October 2023

=== Statistics ===
Statistics are correct to the end of the 2018 season.

Season	Team	G/A	GA	RB	CPR	FD	IC	DF	PN	TO	MP
2018	Magpies	0/0	0	2	6	0	3	13	76	2	8
2019	Magpies	0/0	0	0	0	0	0	0	0	0	0
Career		0/0	0	2	6	0	3	13	76	2	8

== Personal life ==
Garrett is currently studying a Bachelor of Exercise and Sport Science at Deakin University, after initially studying a Bachelor of Education (Primary).
