= 2019 Constellation Cup =

International netball series

Tournament details
- Host countries: Australia; New Zealand
- Dates: 13 October–27 October 2019

Final positions
- Champions: Australia (9th title)
- Runners-up: New Zealand

Tournament statistics
- Matches played: 4
- Top scorer(s): Maria Folau; 105/123 (85%)

The 2019 Constellation Cup was the 10th Constellation Cup series between Australia and New Zealand. The series featured four netball test matches, played in October 2019. The series finished 2–2, however Australia were declared the winners because, having scored 206 goals compared to New Zealand's 195, they had a better aggregate score over the series. This saw Australia win their seventh successive Constellation Cup series.

== Squads ==
=== Australia ===
Australia roster
Players
Coaches

Name	Pos	DOB	Height	Club	Nat	Caps
Caitlin Bassett (c)	GS	23 May 1988 (aged 31)	1.95 m (6 ft 5 in)	Giants Netball	(Australia)	99
Ashleigh Brazill	WD, C	29 December 1989 (aged 29)	1.75 m (5 ft 9 in)	Collingwood Magpies	(Australia)	7
Courtney Bruce	GK, GD	8 December 1993 (aged 25)	1.89 m (6 ft 2 in)	West Coast Fever	(Australia)	35
Paige Hadley	C, WA, WD	26 August 1992 (aged 27)	1.73 m (5 ft 8 in)	New South Wales Swifts	(Australia)	28
Sarah Klau	GK, GD	30 September 1994 (aged 25)	1.90 m (6 ft 3 in)	New South Wales Swifts	(Australia)	9
Tegan Philip	GA, GS	3 September 1988 (aged 31)	1.75 m (5 ft 9 in)	Melbourne Vixens	(Australia)	15
Jamie-Lee Price	WD, C	10 January 1996 (aged 23)	1.79 m (5 ft 10 in)	Giants Netball	(Australia)	12
Laura Scherian	WA, C	26 June 1988 (aged 31)	1.67 m (5 ft 6 in)	Sunshine Coast Lightning	(Australia)	3
Caitlin Thwaites	GS, GA	29 December 1986 (aged 32)	1.88 m (6 ft 2 in)	Melbourne Vixens	(Australia)	54
Gretel Tippett	GA, GS, WA	3 July 1993 (aged 26)	1.92 m (6 ft 4 in)	Queensland Firebirds	(Australia)	35
Maddy Turner	GD, WD, GK	17 December 1995 (aged 23)	1.83 m (6 ft 0 in)	New South Wales Swifts	(Australia)	0
Liz Watson (vc)	WA, C	30 March 1994 (aged 25)	1.78 m (5 ft 10 in)	Melbourne Vixens	(Australia)	43
Joanna Weston	GD, WD, GK	14 February 1994 (aged 25)	1.88 m (6 ft 2 in)	Melbourne Vixens	(Australia)	37

Head coach

- Lisa Alexander

Assistant coach

- Clare Ferguson
  Megan Anderson

Notes

- (c) – Captain
- (cc) – Co-captain
- (vc) – Vice-captain
- – Injury / maternity leave
- (TRP) – Temporary Replacement Player

=== New Zealand ===
New Zealand roster
Players
Coaches

Name	Pos	DOB	Height	Club	Nat	Caps
Karin Burger	WD, GK, GD	12 April 1993 (aged 26)	1.84 m (6 ft 0 in)	Central Pulse	(New Zealand)	11
Gina Crampton (injured)	WA, C	7 December 1991 (aged 27)	1.74 m (5 ft 9 in)	Southern Steel	(New Zealand)	34
Ameliaranne Ekenasio	GA, GS	11 January 1991 (aged 28)	1.86 m (6 ft 1 in)	Central Pulse	(New Zealand)	33
Maria Folau	GA, GS	18 February 1987 (aged 32)	1.88 m (6 ft 2 in)	Adelaide Thunderbirds	(Australia)	146
Phoenix Karaka	GK, GD	6 November 1993 (aged 25)	1.86 m (6 ft 1 in)	Northern Mystics	(New Zealand)	24
Laura Langman (c)	C, WD	16 April 1986 (aged 33)	1.73 m (5 ft 8 in)	Sunshine Coast Lightning	(Australia)	159
Bailey Mes	GS, GA, WA	27 May 1989 (aged 30)	1.86 m (6 ft 1 in)	Northern Mystics	(New Zealand)	67
Katrina Rore	GD, GK	6 May 1987 (aged 32)	1.86 m (6 ft 1 in)	Central Pulse	(New Zealand)	133
Shannon Saunders	C, WA	12 October 1990 (aged 29)	1.78 m (5 ft 10 in)	Southern Steel	(New Zealand)	66
Whitney Souness	WA, C	12 October 1991 (aged 28)	1.74 m (5 ft 9 in)	Central Pulse?	(New Zealand)
Te Paea Selby-Rickit	GA, GS	14 January 1992 (aged 27)	1.88 m (6 ft 2 in)	Mainland Tactix	(New Zealand)	42
Michaela Sokolich-Beatson	GD, WD	2 October 1996 (aged 23)	1.84 m (6 ft 0 in)	Northern Mystics	(New Zealand)
Jane Watson	GK, GD	7 March 1990 (aged 29)	1.81 m (5 ft 11 in)	Mainland Tactix	(New Zealand)	37
Maia Wilson	GS, GA	21 September 1997 (aged 22)	1.87 m (6 ft 2 in)	Northern Stars	(New Zealand)	10

Head coach

- Noeline Taurua

Assistant coach

- Yvonne Willering
  Jane Woodlands-Thompson

Manager: Esther Molloy

Notes

- (c) – Captain
- (cc) – Co-captain
- (vc) – Vice-captain
- – Injury / maternity leave
- (TRP) – Temporary Replacement Player

== Match officials ==
=== Umpires ===
Umpire	Association
Tracy-Ann Griffiths	Jamaica
Kate Stephenson	England
Louise Travis	England
Joan Yuliani	Singapore

=== Umpire Appointments Panel ===
Umpire	Association	Test
David Pala'amo	New Zealand	First test
Janis Teesdale	New Zealand	Second test
Sharon Kelly	Australia	Third test
Jacqui Jashari	Australia	Fourth test

== Matches ==
=== First test ===
13 October 2019; 7:30 pm	Stats	New Zealand	53–52	Australia	Horncastle Arena	Sky Sport; Nine
13 October 2019; 7:30 pm	Stats	Scoring by quarter: 13–11, 26–25, 39–44, 52–53			Horncastle Arena	Sky Sport; Nine
13 October 2019; 7:30 pm	Stats	Ameliaranne Ekenasio 29/31 (94%); Maria Folau 24/26 (92%)		Caitlin Bassett 26/30 (87%); Gretel Tippett 25/25 (100%); Caitlin Thwaites 2/2 (100%)	Horncastle Arena	Sky Sport; Nine

=== Second test ===
16 October 2019; 7:30 pm	Stats	New Zealand	42–48	Australia	Spark Arena	Sky Sport; Nine
16 October 2019; 7:30 pm	Stats	Scoring by quarter: 10–13, 21–26, 32–37, 42–48			Spark Arena	Sky Sport; Nine
16 October 2019; 7:30 pm	Stats	Maria Folau 31/41 (76%); Ameliaranne Ekenasio 8/11 (73%); Bailey Mes 3/5 (60%)		Gretel Tippett 23/24 (96%); Caitlin Bassett 17/20 (85%); Caitlin Thwaites 8/9 (89%)	Spark Arena	Sky Sport; Nine

=== Third test ===
20 October 2019; 2:00 pm	Stats	Australia	53–54	New Zealand	Qudos Bank Arena	Sky Sport; Nine
20 October 2019; 2:00 pm	Stats	Scoring by quarter: 16–13, 30–26, 43–42, 53–54			Qudos Bank Arena	Sky Sport; Nine
20 October 2019; 2:00 pm	Stats	Caitlin Bassett 19/21 (90%); Caitlin Thwaites 16/17 (94%); Gretel Tippett 13/13 (100%); Tegan Philip 5/8 (63%)		Ameliaranne Ekenasio 27/27 (100%); Maria Folau 27/31 (87%)	Qudos Bank Arena	Sky Sport; Nine

=== Fourth test ===
27 October 2019; 12:00 pm	Stats	Australia	53–46	New Zealand	RAC Arena; Attendance: 13,233; Umpires: Kate Stephenson (England); Joan Yuliani (Singapore)	Sky Sport; Nine
27 October 2019; 12:00 pm	Stats	Scoring by quarter: 16–7, 31–18, 41–32, 53–46			RAC Arena; Attendance: 13,233; Umpires: Kate Stephenson (England); Joan Yuliani (Singapore)	Sky Sport; Nine
27 October 2019; 12:00 pm	Stats	Caitlin Bassett 25/28 (89%); Gretel Tippett 22/23 (96%); Caitlin Thwaites 6/7 (86%)		Maria Folau 23/25 (92%); Ameliaranne Ekenasio 21/23 (91%); Bailey Mes 2/4 (50%)	RAC Arena; Attendance: 13,233; Umpires: Kate Stephenson (England); Joan Yuliani (Singapore)	Sky Sport; Nine
