= 2014 Constellation Cup =

International netball series

Tournament details
- Host countries: Australia; New Zealand
- Dates: 2–15 October 2014

Final positions
- Champions: Australia (4th title)
- Runners-up: New Zealand

Tournament statistics
- Matches played: 4
- Top scorer(s): Caitlin Bassett; 129/147 (88%)

The 2014 Constellation Cup was the 5th Constellation Cup series played between Australia and New Zealand. The series, also known as the New World Netball Series, featured four netball test matches, played in October 2014. The Australia team was coached by Lisa Alexander and captained by Laura Geitz. New Zealand were coached by Waimarama Taumaunu and captained by Casey Kopua. Australia won the series 4–0. It was the first time since the Constellation Cup was introduced that one team had gained a clean sweep in the series.

== Squads ==
=== Australia ===
Australia roster
Players
Coaches

Name	Pos	DOB	Height	Club	Nat	Caps
Caitlin Bassett	GS	23 May 1988 (aged 26)	1.96 m (6 ft 5 in)	West Coast Fever		40
Tegan Caldwell	GA, GS	3 September 1988 (aged 26)	1.75 m (5 ft 9 in)	Melbourne Vixens		5
Julie Corletto	GD, WD, GK	10 October 1986 (aged 27)	1.84 m (6 ft 0 in)	Northern Mystics		41
Laura Geitz (c)	GK, GD	4 November 1987 (aged 26)	1.85 m (6 ft 1 in)	Queensland Firebirds		49
Kimberlee Green	C, WA	5 March 1986 (aged 28)	1.76 m (5 ft 9 in)	New South Wales Swifts		62
Renae Hallinan	WD, C	18 July 1986 (aged 28)	1.78 m (5 ft 10 in)	Adelaide Thunderbirds		51
Sharni Layton	GK, GD, WD	6 January 1988 (aged 26)	1.88 m (6 ft 2 in)	New South Wales Swifts		18
Clare McMeniman	GD, WD	11 July 1985 (aged 29)	1.84 m (6 ft 0 in)	Queensland Firebirds		0
Natalie Medhurst	GA, GS	20 January 1984 (aged 30)	1.78 m (5 ft 10 in)	West Coast Fever		60
Kim Ravaillion	C, WD, WA	26 July 1993 (aged 21)	1.75 m (5 ft 9 in)	Queensland Firebirds		13
Madison Robinson	WA, C	5 January 1988 (aged 26)	1.68 m (5 ft 6 in)	Melbourne Vixens		38
Caitlin Thwaites	GS, GA	29 December 1986 (aged 27)	1.88 m (6 ft 2 in)	New South Wales Swifts		8

Head coach

- Lisa Alexander

Assistant coach

- Margaret Caldow

Manager: Julie Richardson
Physiotherapist:
Alanna Antcliff
Performance Analyst: Mitchell Mooney
Media Manager:
Chris Gottaas
Doctor: Sophie Armstrong
Massage Therapist:
Bernd Adolph

Notes

- (c) – Captain
- (cc) – Co-captain
- (vc) – Vice-captain
- – Injury / maternity leave
- (TRP) – Temporary Replacement Player

Milestones

- Caitlin Bassett scored her 1,000th international goal, midway through the third quarter of the first test, on 2 October 2014.

=== New Zealand ===
New Zealand roster
Players
Coaches

Name	Pos	DOB	Height	Club	Nat	Caps
Jodi Brown	GA, GS	6 May 1981 (aged 33)	1.85 m (6 ft 1 in)	Southern Steel		42
Leana de Bruin	GD, GK	9 July 1977 (aged 37)	1.90 m (6 ft 3 in)	Waikato Bay of Plenty Magic		81
Kayla Cullen	GD, WD, C	13 February 1992 (aged 22)	1.83 m (6 ft 0 in)	Northern Mystics		12
Temalisi Fakahokotau	GD, WD, GK	9 September 1994 (aged 20)	1.82 m (6 ft 0 in)	Northern Mystics		0
Katrina Grant	GK, GD, WD	6 May 1987 (aged 27)	1.87 m (6 ft 2 in)	Central Pulse		55
Joline Henry	GD, WD	29 September 1982 (aged 32)	1.83 m (6 ft 0 in)	Central Pulse		85
Casey Kopua (c)	GD, GK	19 June 1985 (aged 29)	1.88 m (6 ft 2 in)	Waikato Bay of Plenty Magic		84
Laura Langman (vc)	C, WD	16 April 1986 (aged 28)	1.73 m (5 ft 8 in)	Northern Mystics		107
Cathrine Latu	GS, GA	25 October 1986 (aged 27)	1.89 m (6 ft 2 in)	Northern Mystics		20
Liana Leota	C, WA	31 October 1984 (aged 29)	1.68 m (5 ft 6 in)	Central Pulse		37
Bailey Mes	GS, GA	27 May 1989 (aged 25)	1.87 m (6 ft 2 in)	Northern Mystics		3
Grace Rasmussen	GA, WA	18 March 1988 (aged 26)	1.77 m (5 ft 10 in)	Waikato Bay of Plenty Magic		8
Ameliaranne Wells	GS, GA	11 January 1991 (aged 23)	1.86 m (6 ft 1 in)	Central Pulse		0

Head coach

- Waimarama Taumaunu

Assistant coach

- Vicki Wilson

Manager: Esther Molloy
Physiotherapist:
Sharon Kearney
Performance Analyst:
Dr Bobby Willcox
Head of Communication and Marketing:
Kerry Manders

Notes

- (c) – Captain
- (cc) – Co-captain
- (vc) – Vice-captain
- – Injury / maternity leave
- (TRP) – Temporary Replacement Player

Debuts

- Ameliaranne Wells made her senior debut for New Zealand in the second test on 8 October 2014.
- Temalisi Fakahokotau made her senior debut for New Zealand in the fourth test on 15 October 2014.

== Matches ==
=== First test ===
2 October 2014	New Zealand	42–59	Australia	Stadium Southland
2 October 2014	Scoring by quarter: 8–13, 17–32, 28–45, 42–59			Stadium Southland
2 October 2014	Cathrine Latu 26/28 (93%); Jodi Brown 5/8 (63%); Bailey Mes 11/19 (58%)		Caitlin Bassett 44/48 (92%); Tegan Caldwell 4/5 (80%); Natalie Medhurst 11/15 (73%)	Stadium Southland

=== Second test ===
8 October 2014	Australia	49–40	New Zealand	Hisense Arena
8 October 2014	Scoring by quarter: 11–7, 24–21, 35–29, 49–40			Hisense Arena
8 October 2014	Caitlin Bassett 33/40 (83%); Natalie Medhurst 7/7 (100%); Tegan Caldwell 9/10 (90%)		Cathrine Latu 25/25 (100%); Ameliaranne Wells 14/20 (70%); Bailey Mes 1/4 (25%)	Hisense Arena

=== Third test ===
11 October 2014	Australia	47–34	New Zealand	Allphones Arena
11 October 2014	Scoring by quarter: 14–7, 24–15, 35–24, 47–34			Allphones Arena
11 October 2014	Caitlin Bassett 32/37 (86%); Natalie Medhurst 10/10 (100%); Tegan Caldwell 5/6 (83%)		Cathrine Latu 14/14 (100%); Jodi Brown 8/12 (67%); Ameliaranne Wells 7/8 (88%); Bailey Mes 5/9 (56%)	Allphones Arena

=== Fourth test ===
15 October 2014	New Zealand	47–51	Australia	The Trusts Arena
15 October 2014	Scoring by quarter: 11–12, 22–21, 38–34, 47–51			The Trusts Arena
15 October 2014	Jodi Brown 25/31 (81%); Bailey Mes 22/33 (67%)		Caitlin Bassett 20/22 (91%); Caitlin Thwaites 15/16 (94%); Natalie Medhurst 10/10 (100%); Tegan Caldwell 6/9 (67%)	The Trusts Arena
