= 2015 Constellation Cup =

International netball series

Tournament details
- Host countries: Australia; New Zealand
- Dates: 20–30 October 2015

Final positions
- Champions: Australia (5th title)
- Runners-up: New Zealand

Tournament statistics
- Matches played: 4
- Top scorer(s): Caitlin Bassett; 139/149 (93%)

The 2015 Constellation Cup was the 6th Constellation Cup series played between Australia and New Zealand. The series, also known as the New World Netball Series, featured four netball test matches, played in October 2015. The Australia team was coached by Lisa Alexander and captained by Laura Geitz. New Zealand were coached by Waimarama Taumaunu and captained by Casey Kopua. Australia won the first two tests and led 2–0 going into the third test. However, New Zealand won the third and fourth tests to level the series at 2–2. Australia were declared the winners because, having scored 202 goals compared to New Zealand's 200, they had a better aggregate score over the series.

== Squads ==
=== Australia ===
Australia roster
Players
Coaches

Name	Pos	DOB	Height	Club	Nat	Caps
Caitlin Bassett	GS	23 May 1988 (aged 27)	1.96 m (6 ft 5 in)	West Coast Fever
Erin Bell	GA, WA, GS	26 October 1985 (aged 29)	1.78 m (5 ft 10 in)	Adelaide Thunderbirds
Ashleigh Brazill	C, WD	29 December 1989 (aged 25)	1.75 m (5 ft 9 in)	West Coast Fever
Laura Geitz (c)	GK, GD	4 November 1987 (aged 27)	1.85 m (6 ft 1 in)	Queensland Firebirds
Paige Hadley	C, WA, WD	26 August 1992 (aged 23)	1.73 m (5 ft 8 in)	New South Wales Swifts
Renae Ingles (vc) (injured)	WD, C	18 July 1986 (aged 29)	1.78 m (5 ft 10 in)	Adelaide Thunderbirds
Sharni Layton	GK, GD, WD	6 January 1988 (aged 27)	1.88 m (6 ft 2 in)	New South Wales Swifts
April Letton	GK, GD	19 April 1990 (aged 25)	1.85 m (6 ft 1 in)	West Coast Fever
Clare McMeniman	GD, WD	11 July 1985 (aged 30)	1.84 m (6 ft 0 in)	Queensland Firebirds
Natalie Medhurst	GA, GS	20 January 1984 (aged 31)	1.78 m (5 ft 10 in)	West Coast Fever
Kim Ravaillion	C, WD, WA	26 July 1993 (aged 22)	1.75 m (5 ft 9 in)	Queensland Firebirds
Gabi Simpson	WD, GD, C	17 October 1992 (aged 23)	1.76 m (5 ft 9 in)	Queensland Firebirds
Caitlin Thwaites	GS, GA	29 December 1986 (aged 28)	1.88 m (6 ft 2 in)	New South Wales Swifts
Gretel Tippett	GA, GS	3 July 1993 (aged 22)	1.91 m (6 ft 3 in)	Queensland Firebirds
Jo Weston	GD, WD, GK	14 February 1994 (aged 21)	1.88 m (6 ft 2 in)	Melbourne Vixens

Head coach

- Lisa Alexander

Notes

- (c) – Captain
- (cc) – Co-captain
- (vc) – Vice-captain
- – Injury / maternity leave
- (TRP) – Temporary Replacement Player

Debuts

- Gabi Simpson made her senior debut for Australia in the first test on 20 October 2015.
- Gretel Tippett made her senior debut for Australia in the second test on 22 October 2015.
- On 25 October 2015, Ashleigh Brazill and Jo Weston both made their senior debuts for Australia in the third test.

Milestones

- On 22 October 2015, during the second test, for the first time in the history of the Australia national netball team, five Queensland Firebirds players were on the court at the same time. The five were Laura Geitz, Clare McMeniman, Gretel Tippett, Kim Ravaillion and Gabi Simpson.
- On 30 October 2015, during the fourth test, Caitlin Bassett scored her 1500th international goal in the opening quarter.

=== New Zealand ===
New Zealand roster
Players
Coaches

Name	Pos	DOB	Height	Club	Nat	Caps
Jodi Brown	GA, GS	6 May 1981 (aged 34)	1.85 m (6 ft 1 in)	Central Pulse
Leana de Bruin	GD, GK	9 July 1977 (aged 38)	1.90 m (6 ft 3 in)	Waikato Bay of Plenty Magic
Kayla Cullen	GD, WD, C	13 February 1992 (aged 23)	1.83 m (6 ft 0 in)	Northern Mystics
Shannon Francois	WA, C, GA	12 October 1990 (aged 25)	1.76 m (5 ft 9 in)	Southern Steel
Katrina Grant	GK, GD, WD	6 May 1987 (aged 28)	1.87 m (6 ft 2 in)	Central Pulse
Phoenix Karaka	GK, GD	6 November 1993 (aged 21)	1.86 m (6 ft 1 in)	Southern Steel
Casey Kopua (c)	GD, GK	19 June 1985 (aged 30)	1.88 m (6 ft 2 in)	Waikato Bay of Plenty Magic
Laura Langman (vc)	C, WD	16 April 1986 (aged 29)	1.73 m (5 ft 8 in)	Northern Mystics
Bailey Mes	GS, GA	27 May 1989 (aged 26)	1.87 m (6 ft 2 in)	Mainland Tactix
Malia Paseka	GS, GA	23 September 1994 (aged 21)	1.83 m (6 ft 0 in)	Waikato Bay of Plenty Magic
Grace Rasmussen	GA, WA	18 March 1988 (aged 27)	1.77 m (5 ft 10 in)	Waikato Bay of Plenty Magic
Ameliaranne Wells	GS, GA	11 January 1991 (aged 24)	1.86 m (6 ft 1 in)	Central Pulse

Head coach

- Waimarama Taumaunu

Notes

- (c) – Captain
- (cc) – Co-captain
- (vc) – Vice-captain
- – Injury / maternity leave
- (TRP) – Temporary Replacement Player

Milestones

- On 25 October 2015, Casey Kopua made her 100th test appearance during the third test.

== Matches ==
=== New World Netball Series ===
==== First test ====
20 October 2015	Stats	New Zealand	44–50	Australia	Horncastle Arena
20 October 2015	Stats	Scoring by quarter: 13–14, 22–26, 34–40, 44–50			Horncastle Arena
20 October 2015	Stats	Bailey Mes 24/28 (86%); Jodi Brown 20/25 (80%)		Caitlin Bassett 38/44 (86%); Natalie Medhurst 12/14 (86%)	Horncastle Arena

==== Second test ====
22 October 2015	Stats	New Zealand	48–58	Australia	Vector Arena
22 October 2015	Stats	Scoring by quarter: 13–14, 27–27, 40–43, 48–58			Vector Arena
22 October 2015	Stats	Bailey Mes 30/32 (94%); Jodi Brown 16/22 (73%); Ameliaranne Wells 2/2 (100%)		Caitlin Bassett 39/41 (95%); Natalie Medhurst 19/20 (95%)	Vector Arena

==== Third test ====
25 October 2015	Stats	Australia	47–50	New Zealand	Hisense Arena
25 October 2015	Stats	Scoring by quarter: 15–9, 28–21, 36–36, 47–50			Hisense Arena
25 October 2015	Stats	Caitlin Bassett 24/24 (100%); Natalie Medhurst 10/14 (71%); Erin Bell 8/9 (89%); Caitlin Thwaites 5/6 (83%)		Bailey Mes 29/39 (74%); Jodi Brown 17/23 (74%); Malia Paseka 4/6 (67%)	Hisense Arena

==== Fourth test ====
30 October 2015	Stats	Australia	47–58	New Zealand	Perth Arena; Attendance: 12,365
30 October 2015	Stats	Scoring by quarter: 12–13, 27–27, 36–45, 47–58			Perth Arena; Attendance: 12,365
30 October 2015	Stats	Caitlin Bassett 38/40 (95%); Natalie Medhurst 7/11 (64%); Erin Bell 2/3 (67%)		Bailey Mes 24/32 (75%); Jodi Brown 34/41 (83%)	Perth Arena; Attendance: 12,365
