= Gretel Bueta =

Australia netball international

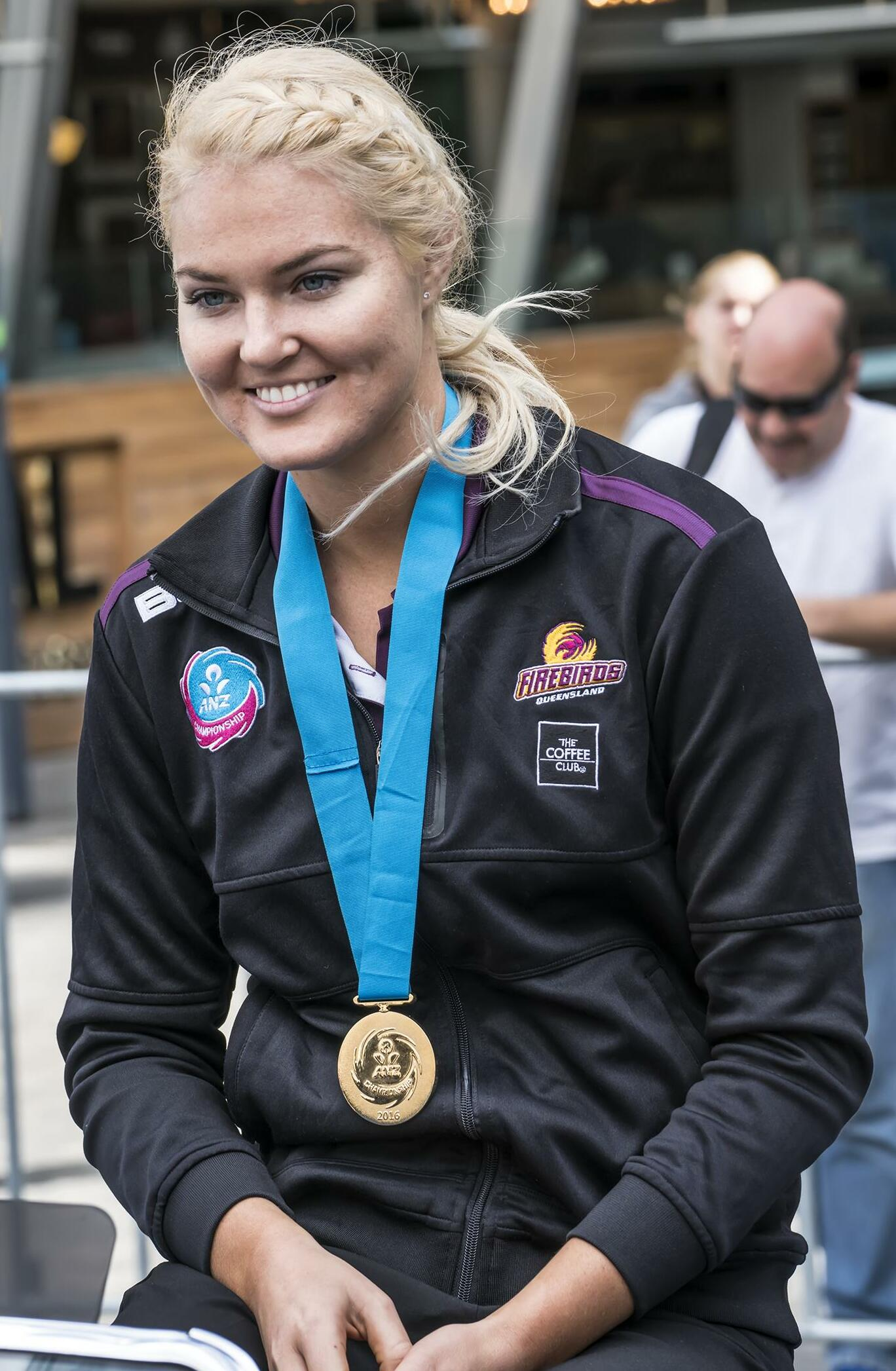
- Tippett at the 2016 Queensland Firebirds parade.

Personal information
- Full name: Gretel Alyce Bueta (née Tippett)
- Born: 3 July 1993 (age 33) Southport, Queensland
- Height: 191 cm (6 ft 3 in)
- Relatives: Kurt Tippett (brother); Joel Tippett (brother)
- School: All Saints Anglican School
- University: Griffith University

Netball career
- Playing positions: GA, GS, WA, GD
Years	Club team	Apps
2012	Gold Coast Jaguars	
2013	Queensland Fusion	
2014	New South Wales Swifts	
2015–2022	Queensland Firebirds	
2026	Johor Jewels	
Years	National team	Caps
2015–2022	Australia	
Medal record
Representing Australia
Commonwealth Games
Gold medal – first place	2022 Birmingham	Team
Netball World Cup
Silver medal – second place	2019 Liverpool	Team

Gretel Bueta (born 3 July 1993), originally known as Gretel Tippett, is a former Australia netball international. Bueta was a member of the Australia teams that won the gold medal at the 2022 Commonwealth Games and the silver medal at the 2019 Netball World Cup. In 2019 she was awarded the Liz Ellis Diamond and was named Australian International Player of the Year. In 2022 she was named the Netball Scoop World's Best Netballer. In 2014 she made her ANZ Championship debut with New South Wales Swifts. She was subsequently a member of the Queensland Firebirds teams that won the 2015 and 2016 ANZ Championships. In 2018, 2019 and 2022 she was included in the Super Netball Team of the Year. Tippett started her sporting career as a basketball player and represented Australia at various youth levels and played for the Australian Institute of Sport and Logan Thunder in the Women's National Basketball League.

== Early life, family and education ==
Tippett was born and raised in Gold Coast, Queensland. She is the daughter of Tony and Janet Tippett. Her two older brothers, Kurt Tippett and Joel Tippett, are former AFL footballers. Tippett attended All Saints Anglican School. She was a member of the class of 2010. The school now hosts an annual inter-school netball tournament known as the Gretel Tippett Trophy. She attended Griffith University and studied for a Bachelors of Nutrition, Dietetics and Clinical Nutrition Services. In 2020, she married Niko Bueta. Together the couple have three children.

== Basketball ==
=== WNBL ===
During the 2010–11 WNBL season, Tippett played for both the Australian Institute of Sport and Logan Thunder. She finished the season as WNBL Rookie of the Year. She missed the entire 2011–12 WNBL season after coming down with glandular fever and would subsequently switch to playing netball.

=== Australia ===
Between 2009 and 2011, Tippett represented Australia at under-16, under-17 and under-19 levels.

Tournaments	Place
2009 FIBA Under-19 World Championship for Women	5th
2009 FIBA Oceania U16 Championship for Women	1st
2010 FIBA Under-17 World Championship for Women	7th
2011 FIBA Under-19 World Championship for Women	4th

== Netball ==
=== Playing career ===
==== Queensland ====
In 2012, while recovering from glandular fever, Tippett started playing social netball to keep fit. This led to an invitation to play for Gold Coast Jaguars in the Queensland state netball league. By 2013, she was playing for Queensland Fusion in the Australian Netball League and for Queensland under-21s in the Australian National Netball Championships. She was also added to the 2013 Queensland Firebirds roster as a temporary replacement player for the injured Chelsea Pitman.

==== New South Wales Swifts ====
New South Wales Swifts coach, Rob Wright saw Tippett play in the Australian National Netball Championships and, shortly after, invited her to join Swifts. She played for Swifts during the 2014 ANZ Championship season. On 31 March 2014, she made her ANZ Championship debut for Swifts in a Round 5 match against Central Pulse. She came on as final quarter substitute for Caitlin Thwaites and scored six goals from eleven attempts.

==== Queensland Firebirds ====
Between 2015 and 2022, Tippett played for Queensland Firebirds, initially in the ANZ Championship and later in Super Netball. She was a member of the Queensland Firebirds teams that won the 2015 and 2016 ANZ Championships. In both 2018 and 2019, she was included in the Super Netball Team of the Year. In 2019, now known as Gretel Bueta, she was also awarded the Liz Ellis Diamond. Bueta missed the 2020 season due to pregnancy. However, she was still named as vice-captain and helped coach the team. On 15 May 2022, during a Round 9 match against Collingwood Magpies, Bueta made her 100th senior league appearance. In 2022 she was included in the Super Netball Team of the Year for a third time.

==== Johor Jewels ====
In 2026, Bueta played for Johor Jewels in Malaysia's Netball Super League. Her teammates included Laura Langman.

==== Australia ====
Tippett initially represented Australia at the 2013 World Youth Netball Championship and at the 2013 Fast5 Netball World Series. On 22 October 2015, she made her senior debut for Australia against New Zealand in the second test of the 2015 Constellation Cup. Starting at wing attack, she helped Australia turn a two-goal deficit into a 10-goal win. At the time, Clare McMeniman described Tippett's debut as one of the best ever. She was subsequently a member of the Australia team that were silver medallists at the 2019 Netball World Cup. In 2019 she was awarded the Liz Ellis Diamond and was named Australian International Player of the Year. Now known as Gretel Bueta, she was a prominent member of the Australia team that won the 2022 Netball Quad Series and was named both player of the final and the series. She was again prominent as Australia won the gold medal at the 2022 Commonwealth Games, scoring 253 goals across the tournament with a 96% shooting accuracy. In December 2022, she was named the Netball Scoop World's Best Netballer.

Tournaments	Place
2013 World Youth Netball Championship	2nd
2013 Fast5 Netball World Series	2nd
2015 Constellation Cup	1st place, gold medalist(s)
2016 Constellation Cup	1st place, gold medalist(s)
2016 Fast5 Netball World Series	2nd
2017 Netball Quad Series (August/September)	2nd place, silver medalist(s)
2017 Fast5 Netball World Series	3rd
2018 Netball Quad Series (January)	1st place, gold medalist(s)
2018 Netball Quad Series (September)	1st place, gold medalist(s)
2018 Constellation Cup	1st place, gold medalist(s)
2019 Netball Quad Series	1st place, gold medalist(s)
2019 Netball World Cup	2nd place, silver medalist(s)
2019 Constellation Cup	1st place, gold medalist(s)
2022 Netball Quad Series	1st place, gold medalist(s)
2022 Commonwealth Games	1st place, gold medalist(s)

== Honours ==
Australia

- Netball World Cup
  - Runners up: 2019
- Commonwealth Games
  - Winners: 2022
- Constellation Cup
  - Winners: 2015, 2016, 2018, 2019
  - Runners Up: 2021
- Netball Quad Series
  - Winners: 2018 (September), 2018 (January), 2019, 2022
  - Runners Up: 2017 (August/September)

Queensland Firebirds

- ANZ Championship
  - Winners: 2015, 2016

Individual Awards

Year	Award
2010–11	WNBL Rookie of the Year
2018	Super Netball Team of the Year
2019	Super Netball Team of the Year
2019	Liz Ellis Diamond
2019	Australian International Player of the Year
2022	Super Netball Team of the Year
2022	Netball Scoop World's Best Netballer
