= List of Australia national netball team captains =

Australia netball captains

The following is a list Australian netball international players who have captained the national team in international tournaments such as the Commonwealth Games, the Netball World Cup, the World Games, the Constellation Cup, the Netball Quad Series and in other senior test matches.

== List ==
Years	Captains	State	Series/Tournaments
1938	Becky Douglas	Victoria	First Test against New Zealand
1948	Mary White	South Australia	Away series against New Zealand
1953	Myrtle Craddock	Victoria	
1956	Pat McCarthy	Victoria	1956 tour of England, Scotland and Ceylon
1956	Gaynor Flanagan	South Australia	
1960	Gloria Haycroft	Victoria	Home series against New Zealand
1963	Joyce Brown	Victoria	1963 World Netball Tournament
1967	Lynette Moroney Davey	South Australia	1967 World Netball Tournament
1969	Elsma Harris Merillo	Western Australia	
1971	Gaye Walsh	Western Australia	1971 World Netball Tournament
1975–1979	Margaret Caldow	Victoria	1975 World Netball Tournament; 1979 World Netball Tournament
1978	Norma Plummer	Victoria	
1981	Pam Redmond	Victoria	
1982	Jill McIntosh	Western Australia	
1983	Julie Francou	South Australia	1983 World Netball Tournament
1984–1988	Anne Sargeant	New South Wales	1985 World Games; 1987 World Netball Tournament
1989–1995	Michelle Fielke	South Australia	1989 World Games; 1990 Commonwealth Games; 1991 World Netball Championships; 1993 World Games; 1995 World Netball Championships
1996–1999	Vicki Wilson	Queensland	1998 Commonwealth Games; 1999 World Netball Championships
2000–2003	Kathryn Harby-Williams	South Australia	2002 Commonwealth Games; 2003 World Netball Championships
2003–2007	Liz Ellis	New South Wales	2007 World Netball Championships
2004, 2011	Catherine Cox	New South Wales	2011 Constellation Cup
2005–2011	Sharelle McMahon	Victoria	2006 Commonwealth Games; 2010 Commonwealth Games; 2010 Constellation Cup
2008, 2011–2012	Natalie von Bertouch	South Australia	2011 Constellation Cup; 2011 World Netball Championships; 2012 Constellation Cup; 2012 Netball Quad Series
2008	Mo'onia Gerrard	New South Wales	
2013–2015	Laura Geitz	Queensland	2013 Constellation Cup; 2014 Commonwealth Games; 2014 Constellation Cup; 2015 Netball World Cup; 2015 Constellation Cup
2014	Kimberlee Green	New South Wales	
2015	Natalie Medhurst	South Australia	
2016	Clare McMeniman	Queensland	2016 Netball Quad Series; 2016 Constellation Cup
2016–2017	Sharni Layton	Victoria	2017 Netball Quad Series (January/February)
2017–2021	Caitlin Bassett	Western Australia	2017 Netball Quad Series (August/September); 2017 Constellation Cup; 2018 Netball Quad Series (January); 2018 Commonwealth Games; 2018 Netball Quad Series (September); 2018 Constellation Cup; 2019 Netball Quad Series ^{(Note 1)} 2019 Netball World Cup; 2019 Constellation Cup; 2021 Constellation Cup ^{(Note 2)}
2019	Gabi Simpson	New South Wales	2019 Netball Quad Series ^{(Note 1)}
2019	Caitlin Thwaites	Victoria	2019 Netball Quad Series ^{(Note 1)}
2021–	Liz Watson	Victoria	2021 Constellation Cup ^{(Note 2)} 2022 Netball Quad Series; 2022 Commonwealth Games; 2022 Constellation Cup; 2023 Netball Quad Series; 2023 Netball World Cup; 2023 Constellation Cup; 2024 Netball Nations Cup; 2024 Australia England netball series 2024 Constellation Cup; 2025 Australia South Africa netball series 2025 Constellation Cup
2022	Stephanie Wood	Queensland	2022 Netball Quad Series ^{(Note 4)}
2022–	Paige Hadley	New South Wales	2022 Australia England netball series^{(Note 3)} 2023 Netball Quad Series ^{(Note 5)}

== Notes ==
- ^1 Regular captain, Caitlin Bassett, was unable to play due to injury. Gabi Simpson and Caitlin Thwaites took over on-court captain duties.
- ^2 At the 2021 Constellation Cup, Caitlin Bassett captained Australia for the first test. Liz Watson captained Australia for the last three.
- ^3 Regular captain Liz Watson, and vice-captain Stephanie Wood were both rested for the 2022 series against England, with Paige Hadley filling in.
- ^4 Regular captain Liz Watson was rested for the second match of the series.
- ^5 Regular captain Liz Watson and vice-captain Stephanie Wood were both rested for the third match of the series, with Paige Hadley filling in.
