= Jo Weston =

Australian netball player

Personal information
- Full name: Joanna Weston
- Born: 14 February 1994 (age 32) Corowa, New South Wales, Australia
- Height: 188 cm (6 ft 2 in)

Netball career
- Playing positions: GD, WD, GK
Years	Club team	Apps
2014–present	Melbourne Vixens	165
- (Correct as of August 31, 2025)
Years	National team	Caps
2015–present	Australian Diamonds	
Medal record
Netball
Representing Australia
Netball World Cup
Silver medal – second place	2019 Liverpool	Team
Gold medal – first place	2023 Cape Town	Team
Commonwealth Games
Silver medal – second place	2018 Gold Coast	Netball
Gold medal – first place	2022 Birmingham	Netball
Bronze medal – third place	2026 Glasgow	Netball
Constellation Cup
Gold medal – first place	2015 Constellation Cup	Team
Gold medal – first place	2016 Constellation Cup	Team
Gold medal – first place	2017 Constellation Cup	Team
Gold medal – first place	2018 Constellation Cup	Team
Gold medal – first place	2019 Constellation Cup	Team
Silver medal – second place	2021 Constellation Cup	Team
Gold medal – first place	2022 Constellation Cup	Team
Gold medal – first place	2023 Constellation Cup	Team
Silver medal – second place	2024 Constellation Cup	Team
Netball Nations Cup
Gold medal – first place	2024 Leeds	Team
Netball Quad Series
Gold medal – first place	2017 (I) England/South Africa	Team
Silver medal – second place	2017 (II) Australia/New Zealand	Team
Gold medal – first place	2018 (I) England/South Africa	Team
Gold medal – first place	2018 (II) Australia/New Zealand	Team
Gold medal – first place	2019 Liverpool/London	Team
Gold medal – first place	2022 London	Team
- Updated on 2023-04-24

Joanna Weston (born 14 February 1994) is an Australian netball player for the Australian Diamonds and Melbourne Vixens in the Suncorp Super Netball league.

She was part of the Diamonds side that won silver at the 2018 Commonwealth Games and gold at the 2022 Commonwealth Games. Weston has been a member of the Diamonds squad since her debut at the 2015 Constellation Cup. She was also in the Australian team at the 2019 Netball World Cup, finishing runners up to New Zealand.

Weston was named Goal Defender of the Year and Player of the Finals in the 2017 Suncorp Super Netball season. She was in the Vixens side that won the premiership in the 2020 season.

Weston was born in Corowa and lived in Rutherglen and Eurobin as a child before settling in Melbourne. She grew up in Melbourne's eastern suburbs and attended Glen Iris Primary and Sacré Cœur School both in Glen Iris. She first played junior netball for Sacre Coeur Netball Club in the Waverley District Netball Association. She is currently studying a Master of Communication at Deakin University. She also holds a Bachelor of Commerce from Melbourne University.

Weston is currently an ambassador for The United Project and sits on the organisation's board of directors. She also serves as the president of the Australian Netball Players’ Association.
