= 2016 Constellation Cup =

International netball series

Tournament details
- Host countries: Australia; New Zealand
- Dates: 9–20 October 2016

Final positions
- Champions: Australia (6th title)
- Runners-up: New Zealand

Tournament statistics
- Matches played: 4
- Top scorer(s): Caitlin Bassett; 184/200 (92%)

The 2016 Constellation Cup was the 7th Constellation Cup series played between Australia and New Zealand. The series, also known as the New World Netball Series, featured four netball test matches, played in October 2016. The Australia team was coached by Lisa Alexander and captained by Clare McMeniman. New Zealand were coached by Janine Southby and captained by Katrina Grant. Australia won the first test before New Zealand leveled the series with a win in the second test. Australia won the third and fourth tests to secure the series 3–1.

== Squads ==
=== Australia ===
Australia roster
Players
Coaches

| Name | Pos | DOB | Height | Club | Nat | Caps |
|---|---|---|---|---|---|---|
| Caitlin Bassett | GS | 23 May 1988 (aged 28) | 1.96 m (6 ft 5 in) | Sunshine Coast Lightning |
| April Brandley | GK, GD | 19 April 1990 (aged 26) | 1.85 m (6 ft 1 in) | Collingwood Magpies |
| Sharni Layton | GK, GD, WD | 6 January 1988 (aged 28) | 1.88 m (6 ft 2 in) | Collingwood Magpies |
| Clare McMeniman (c) | GD, WD | 11 July 1985 (aged 31) | 1.84 m (6 ft 0 in) | Queensland Firebirds |
| Natalie Medhurst | GA, GS | 20 January 1984 (aged 32) | 1.78 m (5 ft 10 in) | West Coast Fever |
| Kim Ravaillion | C, WD, WA | 26 July 1993 (aged 23) | 1.75 m (5 ft 9 in) | Collingwood Magpies |
| Madison Robinson | WA, C | 5 January 1988 (aged 28) | 1.68 m (5 ft 6 in) | Collingwood Magpies |
| Gabi Simpson | WD, GD, C | 17 October 1992 (aged 23) | 1.76 m (5 ft 9 in) | Queensland Firebirds |
| Caitlin Thwaites | GS, GA | 29 December 1986 (aged 29) | 1.88 m (6 ft 2 in) | Collingwood Magpies |
| Gretel Tippett | GA,GS | 3 July 1993 (aged 23) | 1.91 m (6 ft 3 in) | Queensland Firebirds |
| Liz Watson | C, WA | 30 March 1994 (aged 22) | 1.78 m (5 ft 10 in) | Melbourne Vixens |
| Jo Weston | GD, WD, GK | 14 February 1994 (aged 22) | 1.88 m (6 ft 2 in) | Melbourne Vixens |

Head coach

- Lisa Alexander

Notes

- (c) – Captain
- (cc) – Co-captain
- (vc) – Vice-captain
- – Injury / maternity leave
- (TRP) – Temporary Replacement Player

=== New Zealand ===
New Zealand roster
Players
Coaches

| Name | Pos | DOB | Height | Club | Nat | Caps |
|---|---|---|---|---|---|---|
| Gina Crampton | WA, C | 7 December 1991 (aged 24) | 1.74 m (5 ft 9 in) | Southern Steel |
| Ameliaranne Ekenasio | GS, GA | 11 January 1991 (aged 25) | 1.86 m (6 ft 1 in) | Central Pulse |
| Shannon Francois | WA, C, GA | 12 October 1990 (aged 25) | 1.76 m (5 ft 9 in) | Southern Steel |
| Anna Harrison | GK, GD, WD | 15 April 1983 (aged 33) | 1.87 m (6 ft 2 in) | Northern Mystics |
| Katrina Grant (c) | GK, GD, WD | 6 May 1987 (aged 29) | 1.87 m (6 ft 2 in) | Central Pulse |
| Phoenix Karaka | GK, GD | 6 November 1993 (aged 22) | 1.86 m (6 ft 1 in) | Central Pulse |
| Laura Langman | C, WD | 16 April 1986 (aged 30) | 1.73 m (5 ft 8 in) | New South Wales Swifts |
| Bailey Mes | GS, GA | 27 May 1989 (aged 27) | 1.87 m (6 ft 2 in) | Mainland Tactix |
| Storm Purvis | GD, GK | 20 April 1993 (aged 23) | 1.86 m (6 ft 1 in) | Southern Steel |
| Grace Rasmussen | GA, WA | 18 March 1988 (aged 28) | 1.77 m (5 ft 10 in) | Waikato Bay of Plenty Magic |
| Te Paea Selby-Rickit | GS, GA | 14 January 1992 (aged 24) | 1.93 m (6 ft 4 in) | Southern Steel |
| Maria Tutaia | GA, GS | 18 February 1987 (aged 29) | 1.88 m (6 ft 2 in) | Northern Mystics |
| Jane Watson | GK, GD, WD | 7 March 1990 (aged 26) | 1.81 m (5 ft 11 in) | Southern Steel |
| Maia Wilson | GS | 21 September 1997 (aged 19) | 1.87 m (6 ft 2 in) | Central Pulse |

Head coach

- Janine Southby

Notes

- (c) – Captain
- (cc) – Co-captain
- (vc) – Vice-captain
- – Injury / maternity leave
- (TRP) – Temporary Replacement Player

Debuts

- Gina Crampton made her senior debut for New Zealand in the first test on 9 October 2016.

== Umpires ==
| Umpire | Association |
|---|---|
| Jackie Mizon | England |
| Theresa Prince | South Africa |

== Matches ==
=== New World Netball Series ===
==== First test ====
| 9 October 2016 | Stats | Australia | 68–56 | New Zealand | Qudos Bank Arena; Attendance: 15,161 |
| 9 October 2016 | Stats | Scoring by quarter: 16–11, 32–22, 54–38, 68–56 | | | Qudos Bank Arena; Attendance: 15,161 |
| 9 October 2016 | Stats | Caitlin Bassett 47/47 (100%); Caitlin Thwaites 13/14 (93%); Natalie Medhurst 5/7 (71%); Gretel Tippett 3/4 (75%) | | Bailey Mes 28/32 (88%); Te Paea Selby-Rickit 16/21 (76%); Ameliaranne Ekenasio 12/14 (86%) | Qudos Bank Arena; Attendance: 15,161 |

==== Second test ====
| 12 October 2016 | Stats | Australia | 51–53 | New Zealand | Silverdome (Launceston); Attendance: 3,000 |
| 12 October 2016 | Stats | Scoring by quarter: 15–11, 29–29, 42–40, 51–53 | | | Silverdome (Launceston); Attendance: 3,000 |
| 12 October 2016 | Stats | Caitlin Bassett 40/43 (93%); Natalie Medhurst 7/9 (78%); Gretel Tippett 4/4 (100%) | | Bailey Mes 32/34 (94%); Te Paea Selby-Rickit 17/21 (81%); Ameliaranne Ekenasio 4/4 (100%) | Silverdome (Launceston); Attendance: 3,000 |

==== Third test ====
| 15 October 2016 | Stats | New Zealand | 50–62 | Australia | Vector Arena |
| 15 October 2016 | Stats | Scoring by quarter: 13–13, 29–25, 38–46, 50–62 | | | Vector Arena |
| 15 October 2016 | Stats | Bailey Mes 22/24 (92%); Te Paea Selby-Rickit 17/22 (77%); Maria Tutaia 11/17 (65%) | | Caitlin Bassett 55/64 (86%); Gretel Tippett 7/9 (78%) | Vector Arena |

==== Fourth test ====
| 20 October 2016 | Stats | New Zealand | 45–49 | Australia | Stadium Southland; Umpires: Theresa Prince (South Africa); Jackie Mizon (England) |
| 20 October 2016 | Stats | Scoring by quarter: 9–13, 19–22, 32–36, 45–49 | | | Stadium Southland; Umpires: Theresa Prince (South Africa); Jackie Mizon (England) |
| 20 October 2016 | Stats | Bailey Mes 19/27 (70%); Maria Tutaia 17/20 (85%); Te Paea Selby-Rickit 9/11 (82%) | | Caitlin Bassett 42/46 (91%); Gretel Tippett 7/10 (70%) | Stadium Southland; Umpires: Theresa Prince (South Africa); Jackie Mizon (England) |
