= 2017 Constellation Cup =

International netball series

Tournament details
- Host countries: Australia; New Zealand
- Dates: 5–14 October 2017

Final positions
- Champions: Australia (7th title)
- Runners-up: New Zealand

Tournament statistics
- Matches played: 4
- Top scorer(s): Caitlin Bassett; 138/150 (92%)

The 2017 Constellation Cup was the 8th Constellation Cup series played between Australia and New Zealand. The series featured four netball test matches, played in October 2017. The Australia team was coached by Lisa Alexander and captained by Caitlin Bassett. New Zealand were coached by Janine Southby and captained by Katrina Grant. Australia won all four tests to win the series 4–0.

== Squads ==
=== Australia ===
Australia roster
Players
Coaches

Name	Pos	DOB	Height	Club	Nat	Caps
Caitlin Bassett (c)	GS	23 May 1988 (aged 29)	1.96 m (6 ft 5 in)	Sunshine Coast Lightning
April Brandley	GK, GD	19 April 1990 (aged 27)	1.85 m (6 ft 1 in)	Collingwood Magpies
Courtney Bruce	GD, GA	8 December 1993 (aged 23)	1.90 m (6 ft 3 in)	West Coast Fever
Caitlyn Nevins	WA, C	1 June 1987 (aged 30)	1.73 m (5 ft 8 in)	Queensland Firebirds
Susan Pettitt	GA, GS	23 March 1984 (aged 33)	1.80 m (5 ft 11 in)	Giants Netball
Emily Mannix	GK, GD	16 April 1994 (aged 23)	1.88 m (6 ft 2 in)	Melbourne Vixens
Kate Moloney	C, WD	8 January 1993 (aged 24)	1.76 m (5 ft 9 in)	Melbourne Vixens
Kim Ravaillion	C, WD, WA	26 July 1993 (aged 24)	1.75 m (5 ft 9 in)	Collingwood Magpies
Gabi Simpson	WD, GD, C	17 October 1992 (aged 24)	1.76 m (5 ft 9 in)	Queensland Firebirds
Caitlin Thwaites	GS, GA	29 December 1986 (aged 30)	1.88 m (6 ft 2 in)	Collingwood Magpies
Liz Watson	C, WA	30 March 1994 (aged 23)	1.78 m (5 ft 10 in)	Melbourne Vixens
Jo Weston	GD, WD, GK	14 February 1994 (aged 23)	1.88 m (6 ft 2 in)	Melbourne Vixens
Stephanie Wood	GA, WA	28 November 1991 (aged 25)	1.75 m (5 ft 9 in)	Sunshine Coast Lightning

Head coach

- Lisa Alexander

Notes

- (c) – Captain
- (cc) – Co-captain
- (vc) – Vice-captain
- – Injury / maternity leave
- (TRP) – Temporary Replacement Player

Notes

- Sharni Layton and Madison Robinson were included in the squad announced in June 2017. However, Layton withdrew and Robinson was dropped from the final squad.

Milestones

- Caitlin Bassett scored her 2000th international goal in the second test on 8 October 2017.

=== New Zealand ===
New Zealand roster
Players
Coaches

Name	Pos	DOB	Height	Club	Nat	Caps
Gina Crampton	WA, C	7 December 1991 (aged 25)	1.74 m (5 ft 9 in)	Southern Steel
Kayla Cullen	GD, WD, C	13 February 1992 (aged 25)	1.83 m (6 ft 0 in)	Northern Stars
Shannon Francois	WA, C, GA	12 October 1990 (aged 26)	1.76 m (5 ft 9 in)	Southern Steel
Temalisi Fakahokotau	GD, WD, GK	9 September 1994 (aged 23)	1.82 m (6 ft 0 in)	Mainland Tactix
Katrina Grant (c)	GK, GD, WD	6 May 1987 (aged 30)	1.87 m (6 ft 2 in)	Central Pulse
Kelly Jury	GK, GD	22 October 1996 (aged 20)	1.92 m (6 ft 4 in)	Waikato Bay of Plenty Magic
Bailey Mes	GS, GA	27 May 1989 (aged 28)	1.87 m (6 ft 2 in)	Northern Mystics
Samantha Sinclair	C, WA, WD	5 June 1995 (aged 22)	1.71 m (5 ft 7 in)	Waikato Bay of Plenty Magic
Te Paea Selby-Rickit	GS, GA	14 January 1992 (aged 25)	1.93 m (6 ft 4 in)	Southern Steel
Whitney Souness	C, WA	12 November 1995 (aged 21)	1.74 m (5 ft 9 in)	Central Pulse
Maria Tutaia (vc)	GA, GS	18 February 1987 (aged 30)	1.88 m (6 ft 2 in)	Northern Mystics
Jane Watson	GK, GD, WD	7 March 1990 (aged 27)	1.81 m (5 ft 11 in)	Southern Steel
Maia Wilson	GS	21 September 1997 (aged 20)	1.87 m (6 ft 2 in)	Northern Stars

Head coach

- Janine Southby

Notes

- (c) – Captain
- (cc) – Co-captain
- (vc) – Vice-captain
- – Injury / maternity leave
- (TRP) – Temporary Replacement Player

== Umpires ==
Umpire	Association
Jackie Mizon	England
Kate Stephenson	England
Joan Catherine Yano	Singapore

== Matches ==
=== First test ===
5 October 2017	Stats	New Zealand	54–57	Australia	Spark Arena; Umpires: Kate Stephenson (England); Jackie Mizon (England)
5 October 2017	Stats	Scoring by quarter: 13–17, 25–29, 38–42, 54–57			Spark Arena; Umpires: Kate Stephenson (England); Jackie Mizon (England)
5 October 2017	Stats	Maria Tutaia 31/37 (84%); Bailey Mes 23/23 (100%)		Caitlin Bassett 39/43 (91%); Susan Pettitt 10/14 (71%); Stephanie Wood 8/8 (100%)	Spark Arena; Umpires: Kate Stephenson (England); Jackie Mizon (England)

=== Second test ===
8 October 2017; 14.15	Stats	New Zealand	52–60	Australia	Horncastle Arena
8 October 2017; 14.15	Stats	Scoring by quarter: 11–14, 26–29, 39–44, 52–60			Horncastle Arena
8 October 2017; 14.15	Stats	Maria Tutaia 26/29 (90%); Te Paea Selby-Rickit 16/19 (84%); Bailey Mes 10/13 (77%)		Caitlin Bassett 40/44 (91%); Susan Pettitt 8/9 (89%); Stephanie Wood 12/14 (86%)	Horncastle Arena

=== Third test ===
11 October 2017; 19:00	Stats	Australia	55–43	New Zealand	Titanium Security Arena; Attendance: 5,000
11 October 2017; 19:00	Stats	Scoring by quarter: 12–10, 30–19, 38–34, 55–43			Titanium Security Arena; Attendance: 5,000
11 October 2017; 19:00	Stats	Caitlin Bassett 29/31 (94%); Stephanie Wood 14/18 (78%); Caitlin Thwaites 10/13 (77%); Susan Pettitt 2/2 (100%)		Maria Tutaia 16/20 (80%); Te Paea Selby-Rickit 11/15 (73%); Bailey Mes 16/17 (94%)	Titanium Security Arena; Attendance: 5,000

=== Fourth test ===
14 October 2017	Stats	Australia	58–42	New Zealand	Qudos Bank Arena; Attendance: 10,861
14 October 2017	Stats	Scoring by quarter: 12–13, 26–22, 40–31, 58–42			Qudos Bank Arena; Attendance: 10,861
14 October 2017	Stats	Caitlin Thwaites 30/32 (94%); Stephanie Wood 15/20 (75%); Caitlin Bassett 9/12 (75%); Susan Pettitt 4/6 (67%)		Te Paea Selby-Rickit 24/28 (86%); Maria Tutaia 12/16 (75%); Maia Wilson 5/6 (83%); Bailey Mes 1/3 (33%)	Qudos Bank Arena; Attendance: 10,861
