= McMeniman =

McMeniman is a surname. Notable people with the surname include:

- Clare McMeniman (born 1985), Australian netball player
- Hugh McMeniman (born 1983), Australian rugby union player
- Marilyn McMeniman, Australian academic administrator
