= Gina Crampton =

New Zealand netball international

Personal information
- Full name: Gina Crampton
- Born: 7 December 1991 (age 34) Hamilton, New Zealand
- Height: 1.74 m (5 ft 9 in)
- School: Wellington Girls' College
- University: University of Otago; Otago Polytechnic

Netball career
- Playing positions: WA, C
Years	Club team	Apps
2012–2020	Southern Steel	98
2021–2023	Northern Stars	49
2024–2025	Giants Netball	
2026–	NSW Swifts	
Years	National team	Caps
2016–2023	New Zealand	70
Medal record
Representing New Zealand
Netball World Cup
Gold medal – first place	2019 Liverpool	Team
Fast5 Netball World Series
Gold medal – first place	2016 Melbourne	Team
Netball at the Commonwealth Games
Bronze medal – third place	2022 Birmingham	Team

Gina Crampton (born 7 December 1991) is a New Zealand netball international. She was a member of the New Zealand teams that won the 2019 Netball World Cup and the 2021 Constellation Cup. Crampton was also a member of the Southern Steel teams that won the 2017 and 2018 ANZ Premierships. She was named the 2016 New Zealand ANZ Championship Player of the Year and the 2019 ANZ Premiership Player of the Year. Crampton has captained both Southern Steel and New Zealand. Since 2021 she has played for Northern Stars.

== Early life, family and education ==
Crampton grew up in Wellington. She is the daughter of Ngaire and Colin Crampton. She has one brother, Flynn. Colin Crampton, played basketball for Nelson Giants and New Zealand in the 1980s. He later became chief executive of Wellington Water. Between 2005 and 2009, Crampton attended Wellington Girls' College. In 2009 she captained the school netball team as they played in national secondary schools tournaments. In 2010 she moved to Dunedin to study physical education at the University of Otago. She completed her studies Otago Polytechnic.

== Playing career ==
=== Lois Muir Challenge ===
In 2010 and 2011, Crampton represented Netball Otago in the Lois Muir Challenge, a second level New Zealand netball competition that was played concurrently with the ANZ Championship. In 2012 she played for Otago-Southland Remarkables, a combined Netball Otago and Netball Southland team. She was named the 2012 Remarkables MVP.

=== Southern Steel ===
Between 2012 and 2020, Crampton made 98 senior appearances for Southern Steel, initially in the ANZ Championship and later in the ANZ Premiership. In 2016 she was a member of the Steel team that finished the season as ANZ Championship minor premiers. She was subsequently named the 2016 New Zealand ANZ Championship Player of the Year. In 2017 she was a member of the Steel team that won both the inaugural ANZ Premiership and Super Club titles. In 2018 she was vice-captain to Wendy Frew as Steel went onto to retain their title. In 2019 and 2020, together with Te Huinga Reo Selby-Rickit, Crampton co-captained Steel. In 2019 Crampton was also named the ANZ Premiership Player of the Year.

=== Northern Stars ===
In September 2020, it was announced that Crampton would be switching from Southern Steel to Northern Stars for the 2021 ANZ Premiership season. In May 2021, in a Round 2 match against Mainland Tactix, Crampton made her 100th senior league appearance. Crampton made herself unavailable for the 2024 ANZ Premiership season and the rest of the 2023 Silver Ferns season after the 2023 Netball World cup to join her partner in New York.

ANZ Premiership statistics

Season	Team	G/A	GA	RB	CPR	FD	IC	DF	PN	TO	MP
2017	Steel	0/0	?	0	422	?	3	10	28	22	16
2018	Steel	0/0	?	0	462	?	9	14	42	72	17
2019	Steel	0/0	?	0	364	686	8	10	19	61	16
2020	Steel	0/0	?	0	319	434	4	7	31	33	14
2021	Stars	0/0	?	0	359	642	3	5	30	44	15
2022	Stars	0/0									
Career											

=== Giants ===
Initially Crampton intended to take a year off international netball and the ANZ Premiership 2024 season, however she was signed as a training partner for the Giants Netball. Crampton was no longer available for the 2025 Suncorp Super Netball season due to pregnancy.

=== NSW Swifts ===
Crampton was offered a contract to play with the NSW Swifts for the 2026 Suncorp Super Netball Season to replace the pregnant Paige Hadley, making her the ninth New Zealand player to play in the league for that season.

=== New Zealand ===
Crampton made her senior debut for New Zealand on 9 October 2016 in the first test of the 2016 Constellation Cup series against Australia. She had previously represented New Zealand at under-21 level and won the Aspiring Silver Fern award at the 2015 New Zealand Netball Awards. She was a prominent member of the New Zealand team that won the 2019 Netball World Cup. Ahead of the 2020 Netball Nations Cup, Crampton was included in the New Zealand leadership group. Together with Jane Watson, she was named vice captain as Ameliaranne Ekenasio became captain. She was also a member of the New Zealand team that won the 2021 Constellation Cup. On 3 March 2021, during the same series, Crampton, alongside Watson, co-captained the team in the absence of Ekenasio. She was subsequently appointed New Zealand captain for the 2021 Taini Jamison Trophy Series, the 2022 Netball Quad Series and the 2022 Commonwealth Games.

Tournaments	Place
2016 Constellation Cup	2nd place, silver medalist(s)
2016 Fast5 Netball World Series	1st place, gold medalist(s)
2017 Netball Quad Series (January/February)	2nd place, silver medalist(s)
2017 Netball Quad Series (August/September)	2nd place, silver medalist(s)
2017 Taini Jamison Trophy Series	1st
2017 Constellation Cup	2nd place, silver medalist(s)
2018 Netball Quad Series (September)	3rd
2018 Constellation Cup	2nd place, silver medalist(s)
2019 Netball Quad Series	3rd
2019 Netball World Cup	1st place, gold medalist(s)
2020 Netball Nations Cup	1st place, gold medalist(s)
2020 Taini Jamison Trophy Series	1st place, gold medalist(s)
2021 Constellation Cup	1st place, gold medalist(s)
2021 Taini Jamison Trophy Series	2nd
2022 Netball Quad Series	3rd
2022 Commonwealth Games	3rd place, bronze medalist(s)
2023 Netball Quad Series	2nd place, silver medalist(s)
2023 Netball World Cup	4th

== Personal life ==
Crampton is in a relationship with Faʻasui Fuatai, a former New Zealand national rugby sevens team and under-20 rugby union team player. In January 2025 Crampton and Fuatai announced they were expecting their first child.

== Honours ==
New Zealand

- Netball World Cup
  - Winners: 2019
- Constellation Cup
  - Winners: 2021
- Netball Nations Cup
  - Winners: 2020
- Taini Jamison Trophy
  - Winners: 2017, 2020
- Fast5 Netball World Series
  - Winners: 2016

Southern Steel

- ANZ Premiership
  - Winners: 2017, 2018
- ANZ Championship
  - Minor premiers: 2016
- Netball New Zealand Super Club
  - Winners: 2017

Individual Awards

Year	Award
2015	Aspiring Silver Fern
2016	New Zealand ANZ Championship Player of the Year
2019	ANZ Premiership Player of the Year
