= Kurt Tippett =

Australian rules footballer (born 1987)

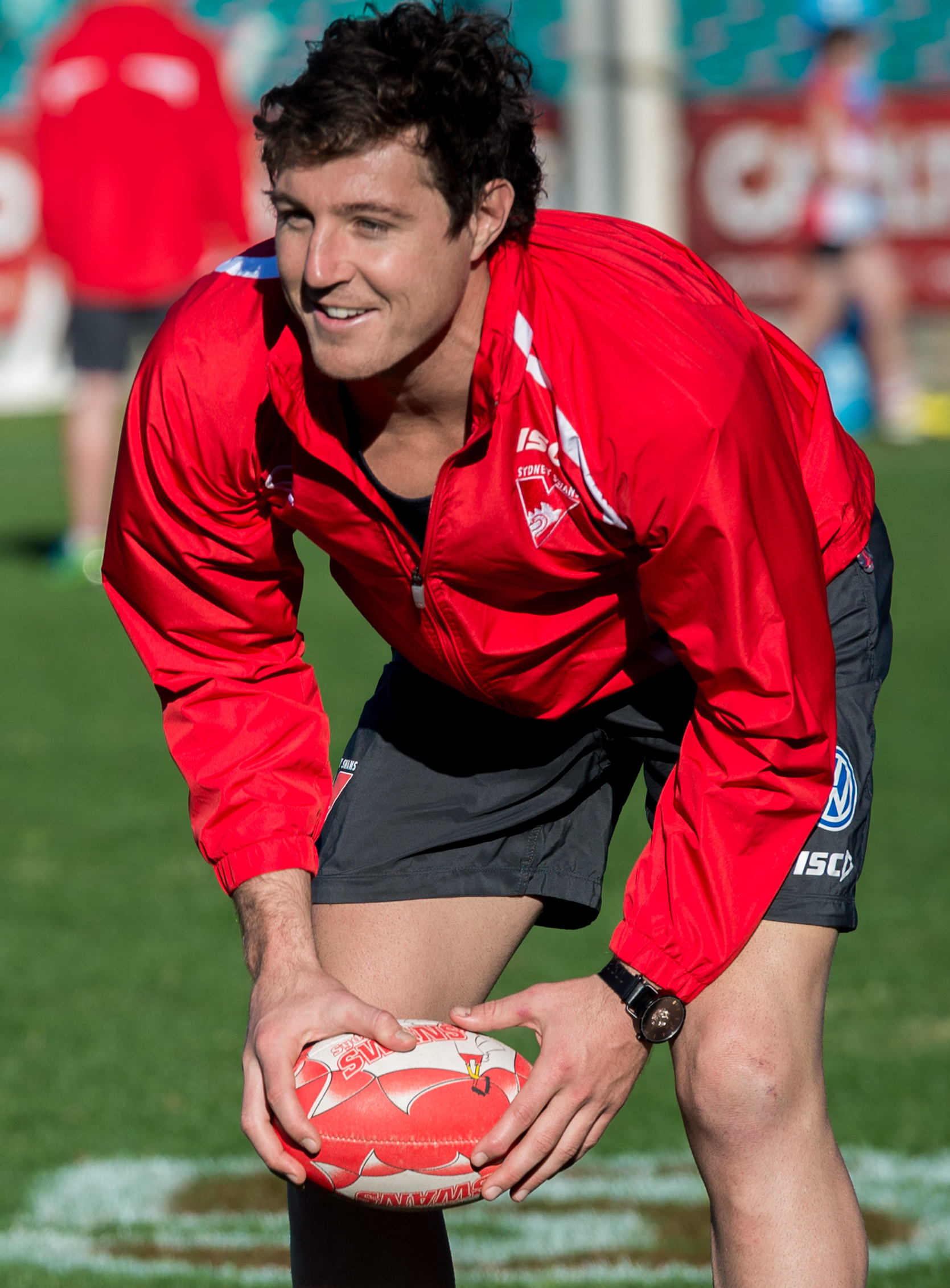
- Tippett with Sydney in October 2014

Personal information
- Full name: Kurt Anthony Tippett
- Born: 8 May 1987 (age 39); Sydney, New South Wales
- Original team: Southport Sharks
- Draft: No. 32, 2006 national draft No. 11, 2013 pre-season draft
- Height: 202 cm (6 ft 8 in)
- Weight: 105 kg (231 lb)
- Position: Forward / Ruckman

Playing career
Years	Club	Games (Goals)
2007–2012	Adelaide	104 (188)
2013–2017, 2019	Sydney	74 (137)
Total		178 (325)

Career highlights
- Sydney leading goalkicker: 2013; Adelaide leading goalkicker: 2010; AFL Rising Star nominee: 2008

Kurt Anthony Tippett (born 8 May 1987) is a former professional Australian rules footballer who played for the Adelaide Football Club and the Sydney Swans in the Australian Football League (AFL).

Tippett represented Queensland in under-18 basketball before transferring to Australian rules football and playing for the Southport Football Club in the Queensland Australian Football League (QAFL). He was selected by Adelaide in the 2006 AFL draft.

== Early life and junior football ==
Tippett was born in Sydney, New South Wales but moved to the Gold Coast, Queensland at two months of age. He is the brother of former AFL player Joel Tippett and professional Netball player Gretel Bueta. Tippett attended All Saints Anglican College during his high school years where he first trialed Australian rules football in an inter-school sports tournament in 2004. His first love was basketball however and at eleven years of age, and made his representative debut for the Gold Coast. In 2004, he represented Queensland in the under 18 championships and was given a spot on the Brisbane Bullets development squad. While competing in the under 18 championships, Tippett competed against the likes of Patrick Mills, Joe Ingles and future AFL player Scott Pendlebury. He also toured the United States with the Queensland Academy of Sport team.

Upon returning from the United States, he accepted an offer from the Gold Coast Stingrays to try out for their Australian rules football representative team. He made the team and they went on to be crowned state champions. Following the victory he joined Southport for their 2005 season and after a few games in the reserves he made his seniors debut at the Gabba against the Brisbane Lions reserves team and matched up on AFL premiership player Jamie Charman. Kurt would end 2005 with Southport's reserves best and fairest award while playing in ten senior matches for the season. He then went on to represent Queensland in the 2006 AFL Under 18 Championships where they would go undefeated through the tournament to win the division two title. He would also be the second highest goal kicker during Southport's 2006 premiership winning season.

== AFL career ==
=== Adelaide (2008–2012) ===
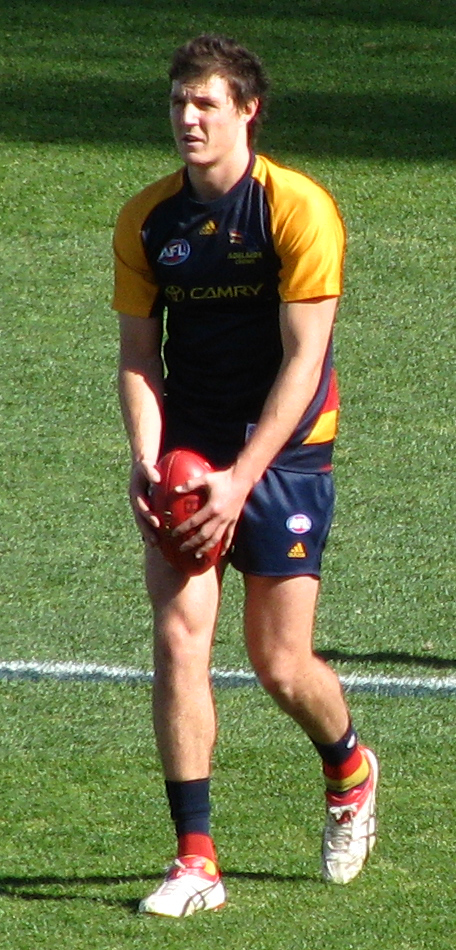
Tippet with Adelaide in August 2009

Tippett was drafted by the Adelaide Football Club with the thirty-second pick in the 2006 AFL draft. He made his debut in round one in the 2008 season against Western Bulldogs at the Telstra Dome. Playing as a key forward and ruckman, he became a regular in the side, but was often criticized for his inaccurate kicking at goal. At the Crows Club Champion evening, he received a 2008 Rising Star Nomination.

By the next season, Tippett had begun to develop into a potent tall forward. A bag of seven goals and a high mark against Essendon in round 11 showed his potential to become the high-scoring key forward that Adelaide had lacked since the departure of Tony Modra, and with successive bags of five against Richmond and Fremantle he showed he could perform on a regular basis. He finished the home-and-away season with forty-seven goals, second behind only Jason Porplyzia – with fifty-two goals – in the club's goalkicking. He kicked eight more goals in the finals to finish with fifty-five for the year. His sixty-metre goal from the boundary line gave Adelaide a one-point lead against Collingwood in the last minute of the 2009 semi final; however, this went in vain as opposing forward Jack Anthony restored Collingwood's lead seconds later, resulting in a loss.

In 2009. he signed a three-year deal with Adelaide, preventing the soon-to-be Gold Coast club from recruiting him as one of their un-contracted player signings. In 2010 Tippett was Adelaide's leading goalkicker.

==== 2012 trade controversy ====
On 6 October 2012, it was announced Tippett had requested a trade to the Sydney Swans. Criticism was later heard from many people, two of which were Crows legend Mark Ricciuto, who said that Tippett was a money driver and former Hawthorn president Jeff Kennett who angrily said the Swans should be stripped of money on trying to get him.

Although things shifted, when it was revealed Tippett and Adelaide had breached AFL rules regarding his contract. Tippett was offered money not stipulated under the club's salary cap. As a result, the club was fined and lost its first two draft picks in the 2012 and 2013 national drafts, while Tippett was fined and suspended for eleven matches. The proposed trade to Sydney was blocked by the AFL, with Sydney eventually picking him up in the pre-season draft, while Adelaide lost Tippett for nothing.

=== Sydney (2013–2019) ===
Tippett debuted for the Swans in round 13 of the 2013 AFL season when Sydney played Port Adelaide at AAMI Stadium. He kicked a goal in the first minute, finished with two, and collected six possessions. Although missing the first eleven rounds of the season, Tippett showed his prowess in front of the goals winning the Swans' leading goal kicker award with a total of 35 for the season.

After an injury interrupted start to the year, Tippett would play his first game for 2014 in round eight against Hawthorn, kicking four goals. He would go on to play the next two games showing good signs before tearing the meniscus in his right knee. He returned against Greater Western Sydney but was in and out of the side due to his troublesome knee. He would then go on to play in his first grand final, only to lose to the Hawks, kicking one goal from sixteen disposals for the match.

Tippett announced his immediate retirement in January 2018 just two months prior to the start of the 2018 season. The effects of a lingering ankle injury was referred to as his key consideration. Tippett had also suffered various hamstring, hip and ankle injuries in the two years prior.

== Post-AFL career ==
Following his retirement announcement, a deal was struck that allowed the Swans to draft Tippett in a non-playing capacity at the 2018 AFL rookie draft, as per his retirement settlement. Due to AFL salary cap rules, the Swans would need to pay the remainder of his settlement within the salary cap, while Tippett remained a listed player. At the conclusion of the 2019 AFL season, Tippett relocated to his native Gold Coast and began to immerse himself within the local surf lifesaving community.

In late 2020, a chance meeting with former assistant coach and neighbour Stuart Dew led to Tippett accepting an assistant coaching role with the Gold Coast Suns for the 2021 AFL season. He was assigned the key forward/ruck group and was able to work closely with the likes of Ben King who would kick a career-high 47 goals throughout the 2021 season. Tippett transitioned into an administrative role with the club in May 2023 when he joined the Suns' Board of Directors.

== Statistics ==
Legend
G	Goals	K	Kicks	D	Disposals	T	Tackles
B	Behinds	H	Handballs	M	Marks	H/O	Hit-outs

Season	Team	No.	Games	Totals								Averages (per game)							
Season	Team	No.	Games	G	B	K	H	D	M	T	H/O	G	B	K	H	D	M	T	H/O
2008	Adelaide	4	19	17	17	70	65	135	44	32	118	0.9	0.9	3.7	3.4	7.1	2.3	1.7	6.2
2009	Adelaide	4	24	55	31	160	98	258	96	60	243	2.3	1.3	6.7	4.1	10.8	4.0	2.5	10.1
2010	Adelaide	4	22	46	34	141	59	200	84	39	175	2.1	1.5	6.4	2.7	9.1	3.8	1.8	8.0
2011	Adelaide	4	18	31	22	148	69	217	85	40	130	1.7	1.2	8.2	3.8	12.1	4.7	2.2	7.2
2012	Adelaide	4	21	39	31	176	79	255	106	32	158	1.9	1.5	8.4	3.8	12.1	5.0	1.5	7.5
2013	Sydney	8	12	35	20	85	44	129	53	29	16	2.9	1.7	7.1	3.7	10.8	4.4	2.4	1.3
2014	Sydney	8	14	34	17	94	62	156	58	15	77	2.4	1.2	6.7	4.4	11.1	4.1	1.1	5.5
2015	Sydney	8	22	44	23	146	121	267	93	68	380	2.0	1.0	6.6	5.5	12.1	4.2	3.1	17.3
2016	Sydney	8	17	17	8	120	104	224	49	43	419	1.0	0.5	7.1	6.1	13.2	2.9	2.5	24.6
2017	Sydney	8	9	7	4	50	33	83	28	26	118	0.8	0.4	5.6	3.7	9.2	3.1	2.9	13.1
Career			178	325	207	1190	734	1924	696	384	1834	1.8	1.2	6.7	4.1	10.8	3.9	2.2	10.3

== Family ==
His brother Joel played in the Australian Football League (AFL) for the Brisbane Lions, Gold Coast and North Melbourne, while his sister Gretel played professional Basketball for the Logan Thunder in the Women's National Basketball League (WNBL) and now plays netball in the ANZ Championship for the Queensland Firebirds.

== Personal life ==
During Kurt's two years with Southport he studied pharmacy at Griffith University on the Gold Coast. In 2021 he was approached by the Gold Coast Suns to work part time as a mentor to the club taller recruits.

== See also ==
- Basketball experiment
