= 2010 Constellation Cup =

International netball series

Tournament details
- Host countries: Australia; New Zealand
- Dates: 29 August – 5 September 2010

Final positions
- Champions: Australia (1st title)
- Runners-up: New Zealand

Tournament statistics
- Matches played: 3

The 2010 Constellation Cup was the inaugural Constellation Cup series played between Australia and New Zealand. The series featured three netball test matches. Australia won the opening test 48–43. New Zealand leveled the series by winning the second test 59–40. Australia won the inaugural Constellation Cup series by defeating New Zealand 46–40 in the final test. The Australia team was coached by Norma Plummer and captained by Sharelle McMahon. New Zealand were coached by Ruth Aitken and captained by Casey Williams. Both teams used the series to prepare for the 2010 Commonwealth Games.

== Squads ==
=== Australia ===
Australia roster
Players
Coaches

Name	Pos	DOB	Height	Club	Nat	Caps
Natalie von Bertouch (vc)	C, WA, WD	16 December 1982 (aged 27)	1.75 m (5 ft 9 in)	Adelaide Thunderbirds
Kate Beveridge	GS, GA, WA	25 July 1985 (aged 25)	1.90 m (6 ft 3 in)	Adelaide Thunderbirds
Rebecca Bulley	GD, GK, WD	18 August 1982 (aged 28)	1.86 m (6 ft 1 in)	New South Wales Swifts
Catherine Cox	GS, GA	24 May 1976 (aged 34)	1.88 m (6 ft 2 in)	New South Wales Swifts
Susan Fuhrmann	GK	30 July 1986 (aged 24)	1.96 m (6 ft 5 in)	West Coast Fever
Laura Geitz	GK, GD	4 November 1987 (aged 22)	1.85 m (6 ft 1 in)	Queensland Firebirds
Mo'onia Gerrard	GD, WD	15 November 1980 (aged 29)	1.80 m (5 ft 11 in)	Adelaide Thunderbirds
Kimberlee Green	C, WA	5 March 1986 (aged 24)	1.76 m (5 ft 9 in)	New South Wales Swifts
Renae Hallinan	WD, C	18 July 1986 (aged 24)	1.78 m (5 ft 10 in)	Melbourne Vixens
Natalie Medhurst	GA, GS	20 January 1984 (aged 26)	1.78 m (5 ft 10 in)	Queensland Firebirds
Sharelle McMahon (c)	GA, GS	12 August 1977 (aged 33)	1.77 m (5 ft 10 in)	Melbourne Vixens
Lauren Nourse	WA, C	10 August 1982 (aged 28)	1.78 m (5 ft 10 in)	Queensland Firebirds
Susan Pratley	GA, GS	23 March 1984 (aged 26)	1.80 m (5 ft 11 in)	New South Wales Swifts

Head coach

- Norma Plummer

Notes

- (c) – Captain
- (cc) – Co-captain
- (vc) – Vice-captain
- – Injury / maternity leave
- (TRP) – Temporary Replacement Player

=== New Zealand ===
New Zealand roster
Players
Coaches

Name	Pos	DOB	Height	Club	Nat	Caps
Liana Barrett-Chase	C, WA	31 October 1984 (aged 25)	1.68 m (5 ft 6 in)	Southern Steel
Leana de Bruin	GD, GK	9 July 1977 (aged 33)	1.90 m (6 ft 3 in)	Southern Steel
Irene van Dyk	GS, GA	21 June 1972 (aged 38)	1.90 m (6 ft 3 in)	Waikato Bay of Plenty Magic
Temepara George	C, WA	23 October 1975 (aged 34)	1.70 m (5 ft 7 in)	Northern Mystics
Katrina Grant	GK, GD, WD	6 May 1987 (aged 23)	1.87 m (6 ft 2 in)	Central Pulse
Joline Henry	GD, WD	29 September 1982 (aged 27)	1.83 m (6 ft 0 in)	Northern Mystics
Laura Langman	C, WD	16 April 1986 (aged 24)	1.73 m (5 ft 8 in)	Waikato Bay of Plenty Magic
Anna Scarlett	GK, GD, WD	15 April 1983 (aged 27)	1.87 m (6 ft 2 in)	Northern Mystics
Maria Tutaia	GA, GS	18 February 1987 (aged 23)	1.88 m (6 ft 2 in)	Northern Mystics
Casey Williams (c)	GD, GK	19 June 1985 (aged 25)	1.88 m (6 ft 2 in)	Waikato Bay of Plenty Magic
Daneka Wipiiti	GS	8 December 1982 (aged 27)	1.94 m (6 ft 4 in)	Southern Steel

Head coach

- Ruth Aitken

Notes

- (c) – Captain
- (cc) – Co-captain
- (vc) – Vice-captain
- – Injury / maternity leave
- (TRP) – Temporary Replacement Player

== Matches ==
=== First test ===
==== Holden Netball Test Series ====
29 August 2010	Australia	48–43	New Zealand	Adelaide Entertainment Centre; Attendance: 8,500
29 August 2010	Scoring by quarter: 12–12, 23–21, 35–36, 48–43			Adelaide Entertainment Centre; Attendance: 8,500
29 August 2010	Natalie Medhurst 24/30 (80%); Sharelle McMahon 24/26 (92%)		Irene van Dyk 23/28 (82%); Maria Tutaia 20/27 (74%)	Adelaide Entertainment Centre; Attendance: 8,500

=== Second test ===
==== New World International Netball Series ====
2 September 2010	New Zealand	59–40	Australia	TSB Bank Arena

=== Third test ===
5 September 2010	Australia	46–40	New Zealand	Vector Arena
5 September 2010	Scoring by quarter: 9–14, 22–22, 31–31, 46–40			Vector Arena
5 September 2010	Natalie Medhurst; Sharelle McMahon		Irene van Dyk; Maria Tutaia	Vector Arena

== Gallery ==
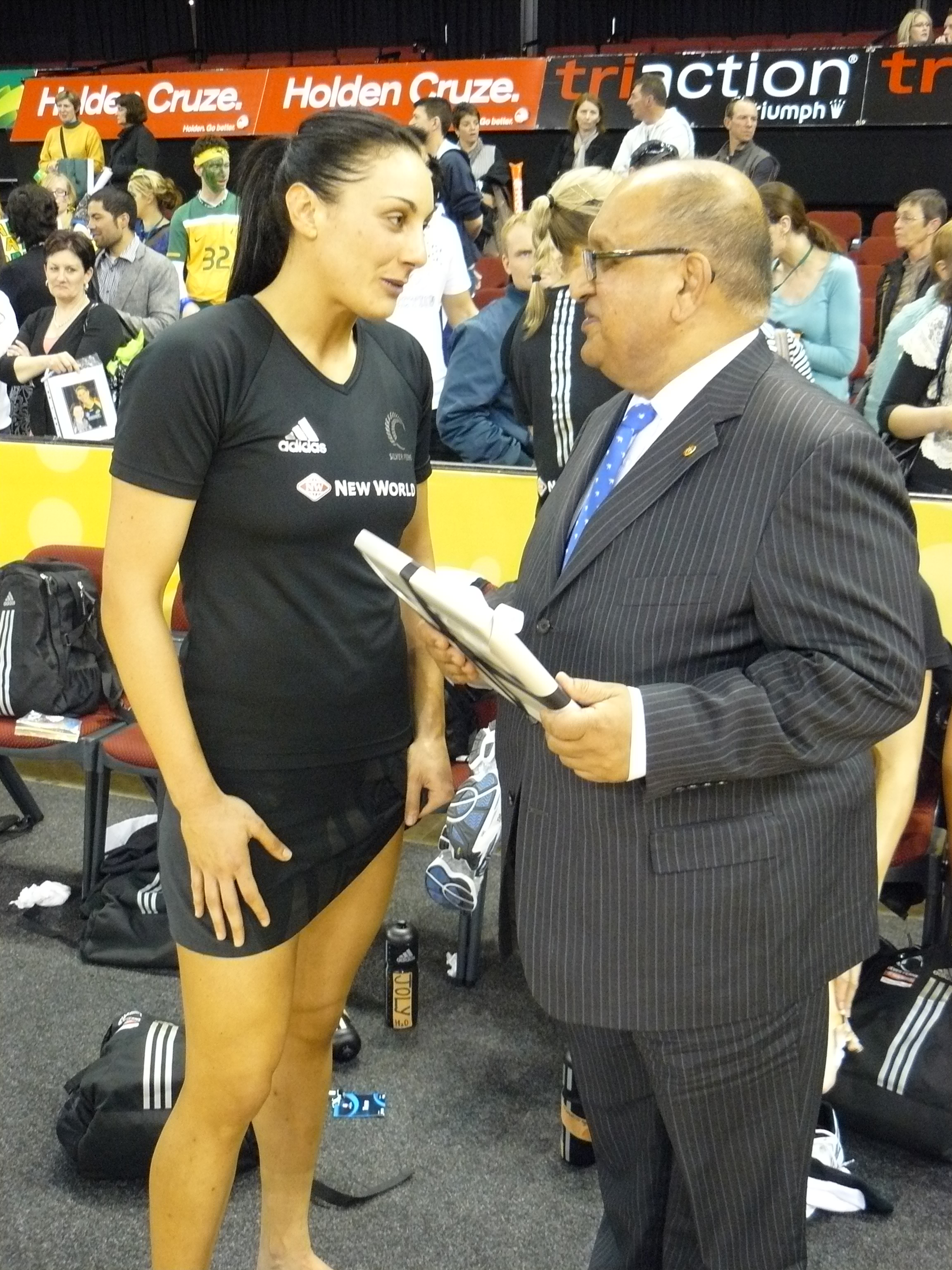
29 August 2010; The Governor-General of New Zealand, Rt Hon Sir Anand Satyanand, talks to New Zealand's Joline Henry.

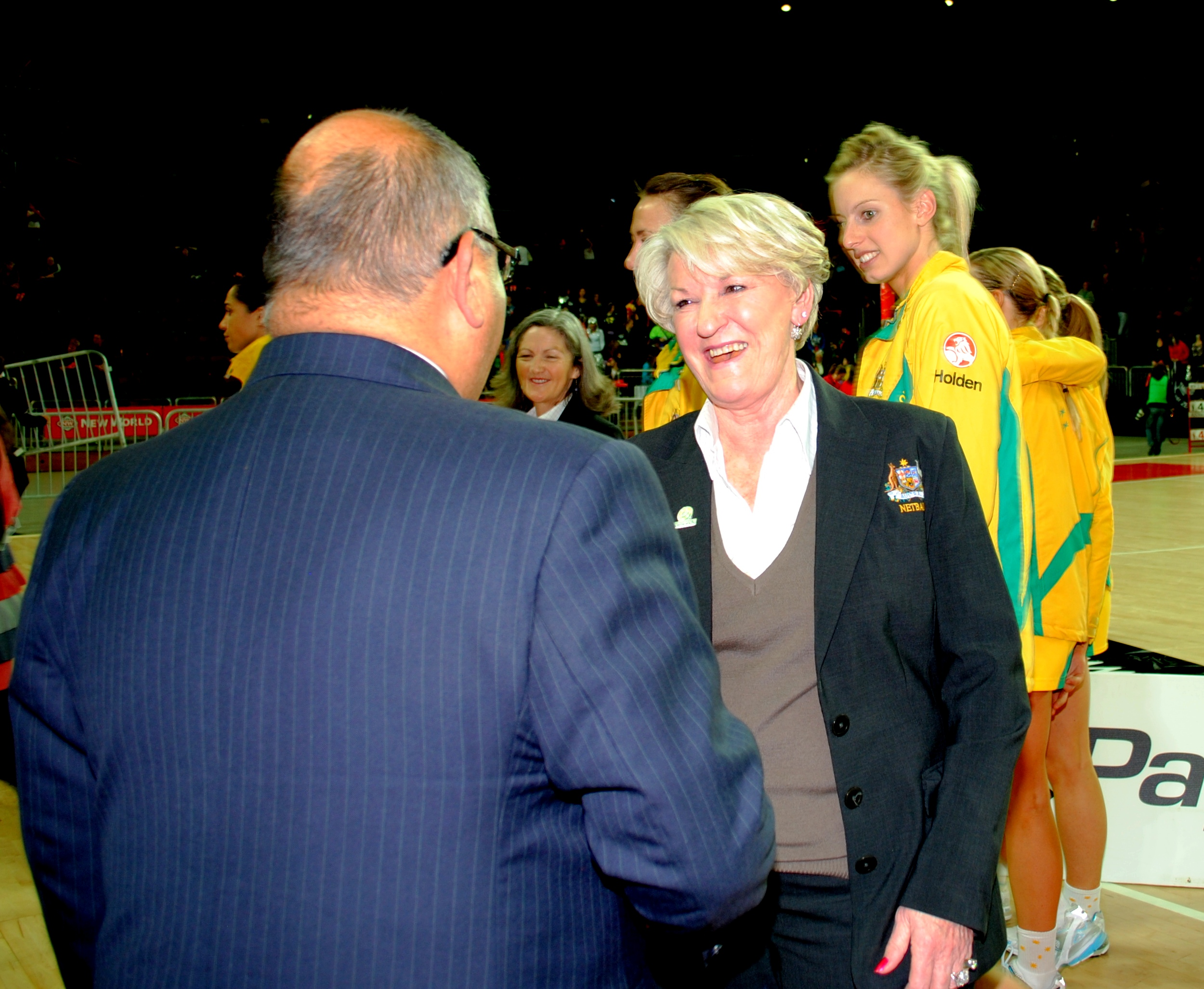
5 September 2010; Anand Satyanand congratulates the Australia head coach, Norma Plummer.

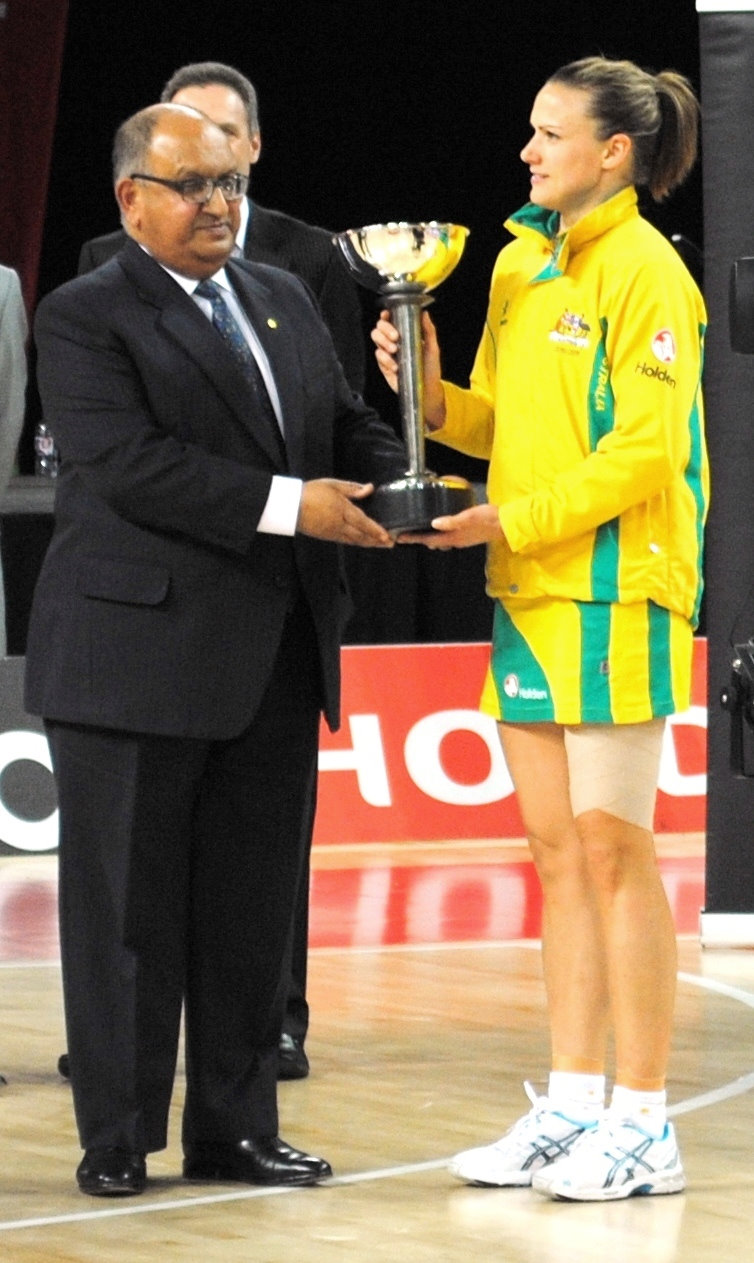
5 September 2010; Anand Satyanand, presents the Constellation Cup to the Australia captain, Sharelle McMahon
