= Joel Tippett =

Australian rules footballer (born 1988)

Personal information
- Full name: Joel Tippett
- Born: 26 October 1988 (age 38); Gold Coast, Queensland
- Original team: Southport (QAFL)
- Draft: No. 57, 2007 rookie draft No. 82, 2009 rookie draft No. 9, 2011 rookie draft No. 8, 2014 rookie draft
- Height: 197 cm (6 ft 6 in)
- Weight: 91 kg (201 lb)

Playing career^{1}
Years	Club	Games (Goals)
2007–2009	Brisbane Lions	0 (0)
2011	Gold Coast	2 (0)
2014–2016	North Melbourne	7 (0)
Total		9 (0)
- ^{1} Playing statistics correct to the end of 2016.

Joel Tippett (born 26 October 1988) is a former professional Australian rules footballer who played for the Gold Coast Football Club and North Melbourne Football Club in the Australian Football League (AFL). He was listed with the Brisbane Lions from 2007 to 2009, however, he did not play a senior match for them.

After that he moved to South Australia where he joined West Adelaide in the South Australian National Football League. He played 21 games in the 2012 season, and has continued to play into 2013.

He is the brother of Sydney Swans player Kurt Tippett and professional Netball player Gretel Bueta. Tippett was chosen by North Melbourne Football Club in the 2013 AFL Pre-Season Rookie Draft at pick 8. He made his debut for North Melbourne in the Round 6 Anzac Day win against Fremantle at Subiaco Oval. In Tippett's sixth AFL game against Geelong he tore his pectoral muscle. At the conclusion of the 2016 season, he was delisted by North Melbourne.

After he was delisted by North Melbourne he managed to find himself on Williamstown VFL list. In 2022, Tippett returned to his native Gold Coast and began teaching Health, Physical Education and Outdoor & Adventure Education at Palm Beach Currumbin State High School.

== Statistics ==
Legend
G	Goals	K	Kicks	D	Disposals	T	Tackles
B	Behinds	H	Handballs	M	Marks

Season	Team	No.	Games	Totals							Averages (per game)						
Season	Team	No.	Games	G	B	K	H	D	M	T	G	B	K	H	D	M	T
2007	Brisbane Lions	47	0	–	–	–	–	–	–	–	–	–	–	–	–	–	–
2008	Brisbane Lions	47	0	–	–	–	–	–	–	–	–	–	–	–	–	–	–
2009	Brisbane Lions	47	0	–	–	–	–	–	–	–	–	–	–	–	–	–	–
2011	Gold Coast	52	2	0	0	5	6	11	4	4	0.0	0.0	2.5	3.0	5.5	2.0	2.0
2014	North Melbourne	36	4	0	0	17	14	31	10	4	0.0	0.0	4.3	3.5	7.8	2.5	1.0
2015	North Melbourne	36	3	0	0	12	9	21	6	4	0.0	0.0	4.0	3.0	7.0	2.0	1.3
2016	North Melbourne	36	0	–	–	–	–	–	–	–	–	–	–	–	–	–	–
Career			9	0	0	34	29	63	20	12	0.0	0.0	3.8	3.2	7.0	2.2	1.3
