= 2024 Constellation Cup =

International netball series

Tournament details
- Host countries: Australia; New Zealand
- Dates: 20–30 October 2024
- TV partner(s): Sky Sport (New Zealand); Foxtel (Australia); NetballPass

Final positions
- Champions: New Zealand (3rd title)
- Runners-up: Australia

Tournament statistics
- Matches played: 4
- Top scorer(s): Grace Nweke; 169/180 (94%)

The 2024 Constellation Cup was the 14th Constellation Cup series between Australia and New Zealand. It featured four netball test matches, played in October 2024. New Zealand had just lost the preceding 2024 Taini Jamison Trophy Series 2–1 to England. However, after winning the first three tests, they eventually won the series 3–1. This was the first New Zealand Constellation Cup win since 2021 and only their third ever in the history of the series. The winning New Zealand team was coached by Noeline Taurua and captained by Ameliaranne Ekenasio. The Australia team were coached by Stacey Marinkovich and captained by Liz Watson. The series was broadcast live on Sky Sport in New Zealand, on Foxtel in Australia and worldwide on NetballPass.

== Squads ==
=== Australia ===
Australia roster
Players
Coaches

Name	Pos	DOB	Height	Club	Nat	Caps
Sunday Aryang	GD	25 December 2000 (aged 23)	1.82 m (6 ft 0 in)	West Coast Fever
Kiera Austin	GS, GA, WA	26 August 1997 (aged 27)	1.85 m (6 ft 1 in)	Melbourne Vixens
Courtney Bruce	GK, GD	8 December 1993 (aged 30)	1.89 m (6 ft 2 in)	Sunshine Coast Lightning
Sophie Dwyer	GA	5 December 2001 (aged 22)	1.83 m (6 ft 0 in)	Giants Netball
Rudi Ellis	GK, GD	13 August 1997 (aged 27)	1.90 m (6 ft 3 in)	Melbourne Vixens
Sophie Garbin	GS, GA	6 April 1997 (aged 27)	1.84 m (6 ft 0 in)	Melbourne Vixens
Matilda Garrett	GK, GD	11 August 1998 (aged 26)	1.85 m (6 ft 1 in)	Adelaide Thunderbirds
Paige Hadley	C, WA, WD	26 August 1992 (aged 32)	1.73 m (5 ft 8 in)	New South Wales Swifts
Georgie Horjus	GA, WA	28 January 2002 (aged 22)	1.72 m (5 ft 8 in)	Adelaide Thunderbirds
Sarah Klau	GK, GD	30 September 1994 (aged 30)	1.90 m (6 ft 3 in)	New South Wales Swifts
Cara Koenen	GS, GA	27 February 1996 (aged 28)	1.90 m (6 ft 3 in)	Sunshine Coast Lightning
Kate Moloney	WD, C, WA	8 January 1993 (aged 31)	1.77 m (5 ft 10 in)	Melbourne Vixens
Jamie-Lee Price	WD, C	10 January 1996 (aged 28)	1.79 m (5 ft 10 in)	Giants Netball
Liz Watson (c)	WA, C	30 March 1994 (aged 30)	1.78 m (5 ft 10 in)	Sunshine Coast Lightning
Joanna Weston	GD, WD, GK	14 February 1994 (aged 30)	1.88 m (6 ft 2 in)	Melbourne Vixens

Head coach

- Stacey Marinkovich

Notes

- (c) – Captain
- (cc) – Co-captain
- (vc) – Vice-captain
- – Injury / maternity leave
- (TRP) – Temporary Replacement Player

=== New Zealand ===
New Zealand roster
Players
Coaches

Name	Pos	DOB	Height	Club	Nat	Caps
Karin Burger	WD, GD, GK	12 April 1993 (aged 31)	1.84 m (6 ft 0 in)	Mainland Tactix	(New Zealand)
Ameliaranne Ekenasio (c)	GA, GS	11 January 1991 (aged 33)	1.86 m (6 ft 1 in)	Waikato Bay of Plenty Magic	(New Zealand)
Maddy Gordon	C, WA, WD	16 January 2000 (aged 24)	1.74 m (5 ft 9 in)	Central Pulse	(New Zealand)
Kate Heffernan	WD, C, WA	7 October 1999 (aged 25)	1.81 m (5 ft 11 in)	Southern Steel	(New Zealand)
Kelly Jackson	GK, GD	22 October 1996 (aged 27)	1.92 m (6 ft 4 in)	Central Pulse	(New Zealand)
Phoenix Karaka	GK, GD	6 November 1993 (aged 30)	1.86 m (6 ft 1 in)	Northern Mystics	(New Zealand)
Paris Mason	GK, GD, WD	13 December 2002 (aged 21)	1.84 m (6 ft 0 in)	Central Pulse	(New Zealand)
Erena Mikaere	GD, GK	9 July 1988 (aged 36)	1.93 m (6 ft 4 in)	Waikato Bay of Plenty Magic	(New Zealand)
Grace Nweke	GS	7 February 2002 (aged 22)	1.93 m (6 ft 4 in)	New South Wales Swifts	(Australia)
Claire O'Brien	WA, C	11 March 1997 (aged 27)	1.73 m (5 ft 8 in)	Waikato Bay of Plenty Magic	(New Zealand)
Kimiora Poi	C, WA	1 November 1997 (aged 26)	1.68 m (5 ft 6 in)	Southern Steel	(New Zealand)
Amelia Walmsley	GS, GA	31 January 2004 (aged 20)	1.92 m (6 ft 4 in)	Central Pulse	(New Zealand)
Maia Wilson	GS, GA	21 September 1997 (aged 27)	1.87 m (6 ft 2 in)	Northern Stars	(New Zealand)

Head coach

- Noeline Taurua

Notes

- (c) – Captain
- (cc) – Co-captain
- (vc) – Vice-captain
- – Injury / maternity leave
- (TRP) – Temporary Replacement Player

== Match officials ==
=== Umpires ===
Umpire	Association
Gary Burgess	England
Louise Travis	England
Kate Mann	England

=== Umpire Appointments Panel ===
Umpire	Association
Jacqui Jashari	Australia
Sharon Kelly	Australia
Kirsten Lloyd	New Zealand
Janis Teesdale	New Zealand

== Series Decider Time ==
Before the series, a new ruling was announced to determine a winner in the event of the series ending 2–2. Each match of the 2024 Constellation Cup will be played to an outright result. If a match is tied at full time, extra time will be implemented as per the World Netball Rules of netball. Series Decider Time will be played to determine the outright winner of the Constellation Cup trophy. Scores will return to zero and play will consist of two seven-minute halves, with a half-time interval of four minutes. If, at the end of Series Decider Time, the scores are tied, the match will move into a period of Series Decider Additional Time. In the event of a draw at the end of extra time, play will continue until one team leads by two goals. There will be no break in play between Series Decider Time and Series Decider Additional Time.

== Matches ==
=== First test ===
20 October 2024; 19:30 NZDT	Stats	New Zealand	64–50	Australia	TSB Arena
20 October 2024; 19:30 NZDT	Stats	Scoring by quarter: 17–16, 34–25, 47–40, 64–50			TSB Arena
20 October 2024; 19:30 NZDT	Stats	Grace Nweke 50/53 (94%); Ameliaranne Ekenasio 14/15 (93%)		Cara Koenen 20/22 (91%); Sophie Garbin 13/14 (93%); Kiera Austin 9/14 (64%); Sophie Dwyer 8/12 (67%)	TSB Arena

=== Second test ===
23 October 2024; 19:30 NZDT	Stats	New Zealand	63–52	Australia	Spark Arena
23 October 2024; 19:30 NZDT	Stats	Scoring by quarter: 18–11, 33–23, 48–39, 63–52			Spark Arena
23 October 2024; 19:30 NZDT	Stats	Grace Nweke 47/51 (92%); Ameliaranne Ekenasio 16/18 (89%)		Sophie Garbin 30/33 (91%); Sophie Dwyer 12/14 (86%); Kiera Austin 10/12 (83%)	Spark Arena

=== Third test ===
27 October 2024; 16:00 AWST	Stats	Australia	43–61	New Zealand	RAC Arena
27 October 2024; 16:00 AWST	Stats	Scoring by quarter: 15–15, 26–28, 35–46, 43–61			RAC Arena
27 October 2024; 16:00 AWST	Stats	Sophie Garbin 26/28 (93%); Sophie Dwyer 14/20 (70%); Cara Koenen 3/7 (43%)		Grace Nweke 47/50 (94%); Ameliaranne Ekenasio 14/17 (82%)	RAC Arena

=== Fourth test ===
30 October 2024; 19:00 AEDT	Stats	Australia	63–50	New Zealand	John Cain Arena
30 October 2024; 19:00 AEDT	Stats	Scoring by quarter: 15–15, 32–26, 48–37, 63–50			John Cain Arena
30 October 2024; 19:00 AEDT	Stats	Sophie Garbin 36/36 (100%); Kiera Austin 27/30 (90%)		Grace Nweke 25/26 (96%); Ameliaranne Ekenasio 11/14 (79%); Amelia Walmsley 9/11 (82%); Maia Wilson 5/6 (83%)	John Cain Arena
