= Hugh McMeniman =

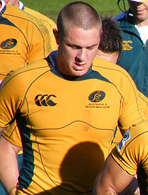
- Born: Hugh McMeniman; 1 November 1983 (age 43) Brisbane, Queensland, Australia
- Height: 2.00 m (6 ft 6 1/2 in)
- Weight: 114 kg (17 st 13 lb)
- School: St. Joseph's Nudgee College; Warwick West
- University: Queensland University of Technology
- Notable relative: Clare McMeniman (sister)

Rugby union career
- Position: Lock / Flanker
Senior career
Years	Team	Apps	(Points)
2010–11	Kubota Spears	4	(5)
2014–17	Honda Heat	8	(0)
- Correct as of 15 January 2017
Super Rugby
Years	Team	Apps	(Points)
2005–09	Reds	30	(0)
2013–14	Force	13	(0)
- Correct as of 13 July 2013
International career
Years	Team	Apps	(Points)
2005–13	Australia	22	(0)
2005	Australia A		
2001	Australian Schoolboys	5	(0)
- Correct as of 18 August 2013

Hugh McMeniman (born 1 November 1983 in Brisbane) is an Australian retired professional rugby union footballer. He represented Australia in 22 tests and played for the Queensland Reds and Western Force in Super Rugby as well as for Kubota Spears and Honda Heat in Japan. His favoured position was blindside flanker but he also played as a lock.

== Domestic career ==
McMeniman made his Super 12 debut for the Queensland Reds in 2005 in a match against the Hurricanes. That season he played nine games at lock and one at blindside flanker. In 2009, McMeniman signed a two-year contract with Japanese side Kubota Spears. In 2013, he returned to Australia to play for the Western Force. However, on 24 February, it was announced that he would leave the Force at the end of the 2014 season to join Japanese club Honda Heat on a two-year stint.

== International career ==
Following a strong debut Super 12 season, McMeniman was selected for the Wallabies team for a match against Samoa that year in Sydney, the same game Rocky Elsom debuted in. He went on to be included in the subsequent matches against Italy in Melbourne and France in Brisbane. He was elevated into the starting lineup for end of year tests against England, Ireland and Wales. He was then selected to go on the 2006 spring tour of the UK and Italy, but eight minutes into the first match against club side Ospreys he hyper extended his neck. In 2007 he played two Tri Nations test matches against South Africa and New Zealand, he then was selected in the 2007 Rugby World Cup, where he played pool matches against Japan, Fiji, Canada where he went over twice but both were refused by the referee. He also played in the Quarter Final against England where the Wallabies lost 12–10.
