= Clare McMeniman =

Australia international netball player

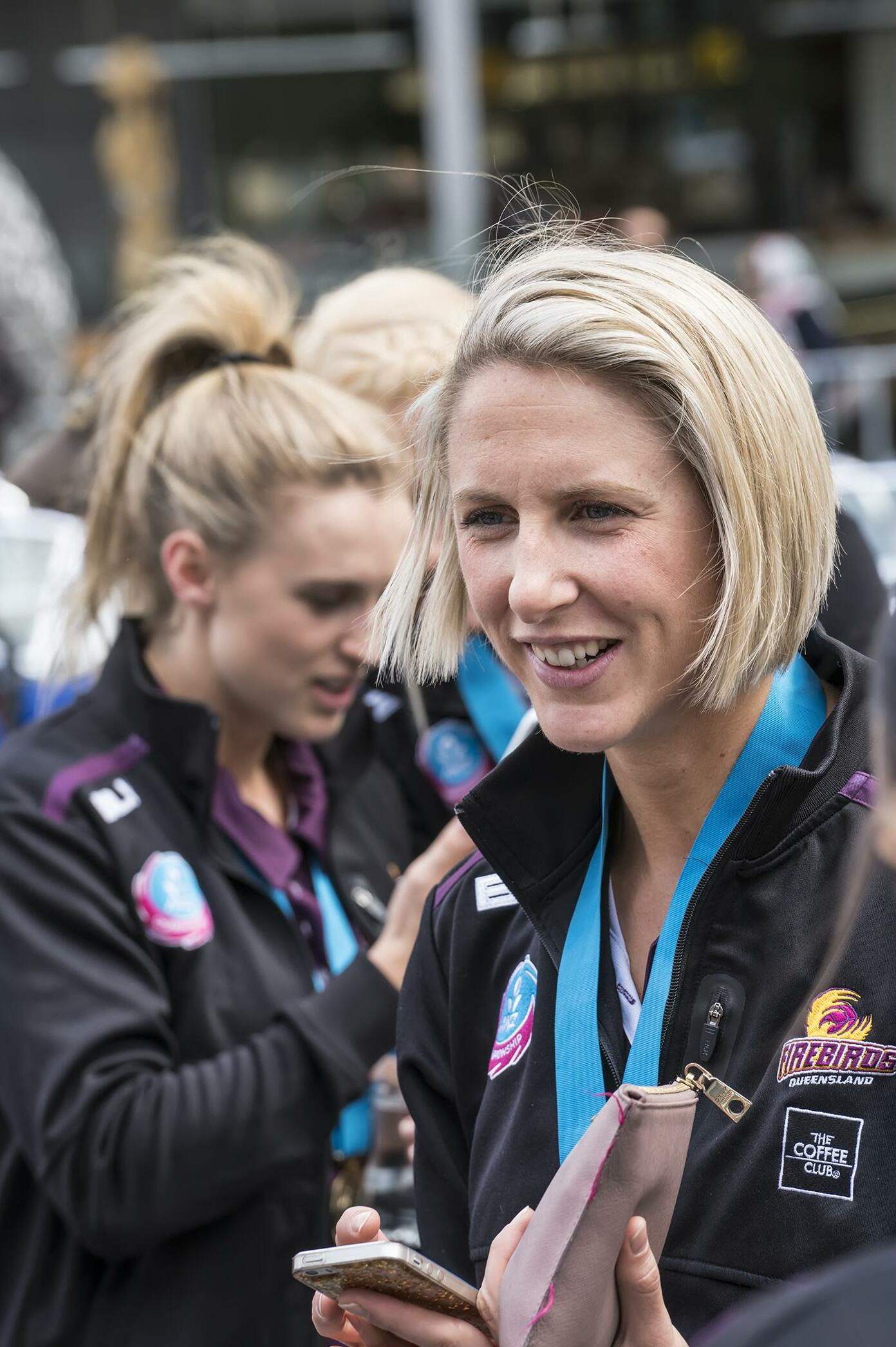

Personal information
- Full name: Clare Ferguson (née: McMeniman)
- Born: 11 July 1985 (age 41)
- Height: 185 cm (6 ft 1 in)
- Relative: Hugh McMeniman (brother)
- School: Warwick West State School; John Paul College
- University: University of Queensland

Netball career
- Playing positions: GD, WD
Years	Club team	Apps
2004–2006	AIS Canberra Darters	
2007–2016	Queensland Firebirds	
Years	National team	Caps
2014–2016	Australia	15
Medal record
Representing Australia
Fast5 Netball World Series
Silver medal – second place	2014 Auckland	Team
World Youth Netball Championships
Bronze medal – third place	2005 Fort Lauderdale	Team

Clare McMeniman (born 11 July 1985), also known as Clare Ferguson, is a former Australia netball international player. She captained Australia when they won the 2016 Netball Quad Series and the 2016 Constellation Cup. McMeniman was also a member of the Queensland Firebirds team that won the 2011, 2015 and 2016 ANZ Championships.

== Early life, family and education ==
McMeniman was raised in Warwick, Queensland. She is the daughter of Geoff and Anne-Maree McMeniman. Her father, a solicitor, died in 2009 and her mother died in 2012. Her older brother, Hugh McMeniman, is a former Australian rugby union international player. She was educated at Warwick West State School and John Paul College, Brisbane. She also attended the University of Queensland where she gained a Bachelor of Science degree in 2007 and a Masters of Speech Pathology degree in 2010. During her playing career, she also worked full-time as a speech pathologist at the Princess Alexandra Hospital, Brisbane.

== Playing career ==
=== AIS Canberra Darters ===
Between 2004 and 2006, McMeniman played for AIS Canberra Darters in the Commonwealth Bank Trophy league. Her Darters team mates included Laura Geitz. In 2005 she received the league's Best New Talent award.

=== Queensland Firebirds ===
Between 2007 and 2016, McMeniman played for Queensland Firebirds, originally in the Commonwealth Bank Trophy league and subsequently in the ANZ Championship. After helping Firebirds win the 2011 ANZ Championship, she initially announced her retirement. However, after missing the 2012 and 2013 seasons, she returned to play for Firebirds in 2014. She subsequently helped Firebirds win two further ANZ Championships in 2015 and 2016. Together with Romelda Aiken and Laura Geitz, McMeniman was one of only three players who featured in all three Championship winning squads.

=== Australia ===
McMeniman was a member of the Australia U21 that won a bronze medal at the 2005 World Youth Netball Championships On 22 October 2014, McMeniman made her senior Australia debut during a Test series against England. Together with Erin Bell, she subsequently co-captained Australia at the 2014 Fast5 Netball World Series. McMeniman was included in an 18-player squad for the 2015 Netball World Cup but missed out on selection when the squad was reduced to 12.

In January 2016 McMeniman captained Australia when they won an away Test series against England. She subsequently captained Australia as they won the 2016 Netball Quad Series. She retired as a netball player after leading Australia to victory in the 2016 Constellation Cup.

Tournaments	Place
2005 World Youth Netball Championships	3rd place, bronze medalist(s)
2014 Fast5 Netball World Series	2nd place, silver medalist(s)
2016 Netball Quad Series	1st place, gold medalist(s)
2016 Constellation Cup.	1st place, gold medalist(s)

== Coaching career ==
In 2014 McMeniman and Laura Geitz established Fuel2Fly, a company organizing netball training sessions and clinics. In 2018 and 2019 McMeniman, now Ferguson, was a member of Lisa Alexander's coaching staff with Australia. In 2020 Ferguson joined Roselee Jencke's coaching staff at Queensland Firebirds.

== Honours ==
Australia

- Netball Quad Series
  - Winners: 2016
- Fast5 Netball World Series
  - Runners Up: 2014

Queensland Firebirds

- ANZ Championship
  - Winners: 2011, 2015, 2016

Individual

- Best New Talent
  - 2005
