= Constellation Cup =

International netball competition

- Upcoming season or competition: 2026 Constellation Cup
- Sport: Netball
- First season: 2010
- No. of teams: 2
- Most recent champion: New Zealand
- Most titles: Australia (11 titles)
- Broadcasters: Foxtel (Australia); Sky Sport (New Zealand)

The Constellation Cup is an international netball competition contested by Australia and New Zealand. The competition features a series of test matches. The two teams have competed for the trophy since 2010. Australia won the inaugural series and have gone on to become the competition's dominant team. Between 2013 and 2019, Australia won the series on seven successive occasions. New Zealand won the trophy for the first time in 2012 and for a second time in 2021.

== History ==
=== Background ===
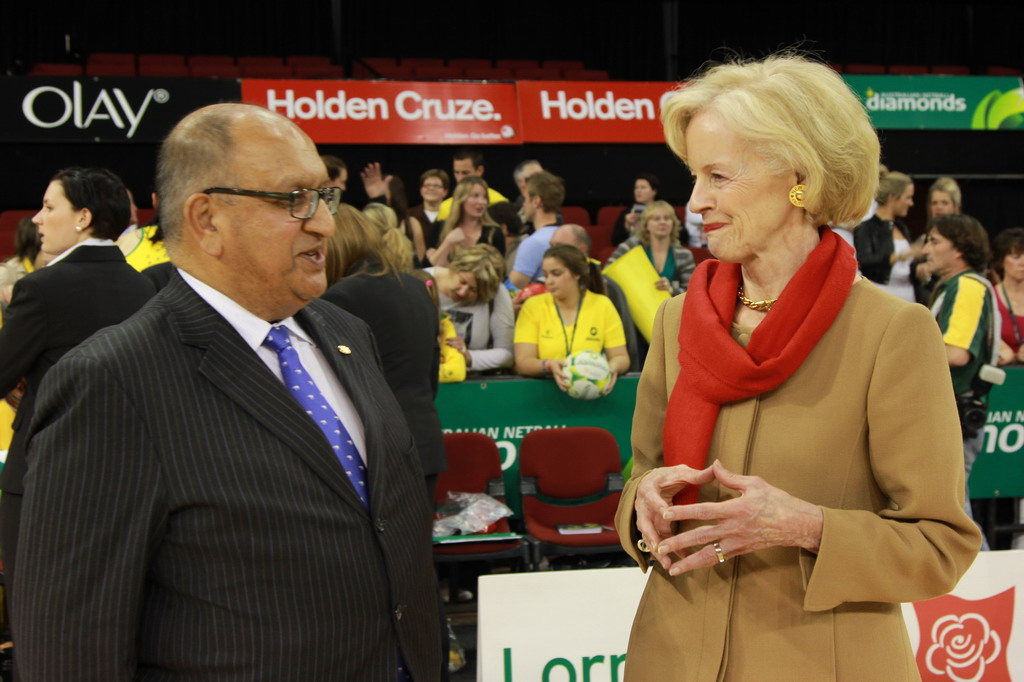
29 August 2010; Sir Anand Satyanand and Quentin Bryce AC, attending the first test of the inaugural 2010 Constellation Cup series played at the Adelaide Entertainment Centre.

The Constellation Cup was introduced by Netball Australia and Netball New Zealand with the support of the offices of the Governor-General of Australia and the Governor-General of New Zealand. The concept was inspired by the Bledisloe Cup, a similar competition featuring the Australia and New Zealand national rugby union teams. The Governor-General of New Zealand, Sir Anand Satyanand, stated:

Almost 80 years ago, Lord Bledisloe, one of my predecessors as Governor-General gifted the cup that bears his name and which has come to symbolise rivalry on the rugby field between Australia and New Zealand. The Constellation Cup will provide an equally enduring focus for netballers on both sides of the Tasman and recognise the wide participation in the sport.

On 29 August 2010, both governors-general, Sir Anand Satyanand and Quentin Bryce AC, attended the first test of the inaugural 2010 Constellation Cup series played at the Adelaide Entertainment Centre. On 5 September 2010, Anand Satyanand also presented the Constellation Cup to the first winning captain, Australia's Sharelle McMahon.

=== Trophy ===
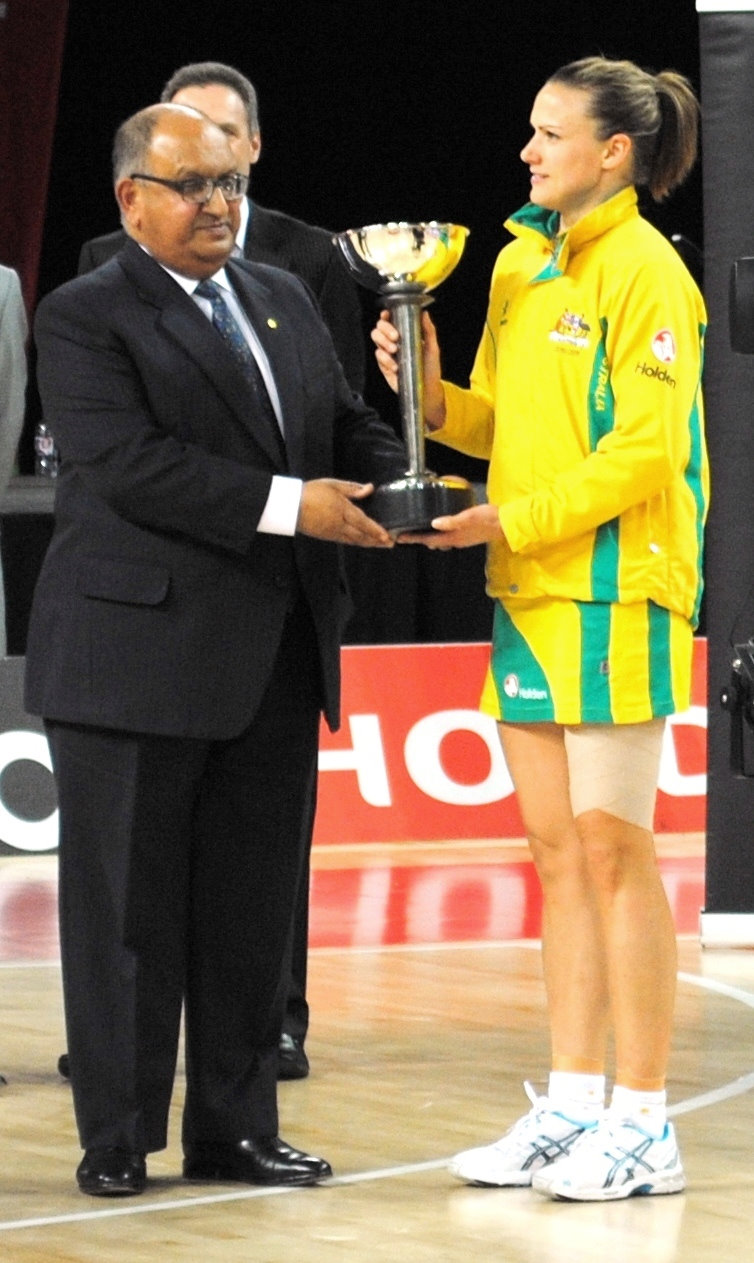
5 September 2010; Sir Anand Satyanand, presents the Constellation Cup to the Australia captain, Sharelle McMahon

The Constellation Cup is named after the Southern Cross constellation which is featured on both the flag of Australia and the flag of New Zealand. The trophy itself consists of a 3 kilogram sterling silver cup encrusted with 101 diamonds, which equates to 3.38 carats. The display case is crafted from black maire. Its design was a collaboration between Australian designer Michael Wilson, who made the Cup, and the New Zealand master craftsman Vic Matthews, who made the display case. The base of the trophy is made out of 5,000 year old ancient Murray River red gum and in total it stands at 47.3 cm tall. The transportation box, which houses the Constellation Cup and display case, includes leather from the Distinguished Visitor's chair from the Australian Senate Chamber. The following words are inscribed on the display case of the Constellation Cup:

The great constellation of the southern sky, the Crux, or Southern Cross, shines down on Australians and New Zealanders, and has provided guidance and inspiration to them across the ages. A source of pride to both nations, its bright stars have come to represent achievement, optimism, aspiration and timelessness. Both countries claim the Southern Cross as their own, and it adorns the national flags of each. In netball, there is no fiercer rivalry than that between the Australian Diamonds and New Zealand’s Silver Ferns. The battle for supremacy on the court has been waged since 1938. This Constellation Cup is the perpetual trophy and symbol of that intense rivalry and the respect between these two great netballing nations. Forged from silver, to represent New Zealand’s Silver Ferns, and studded with diamonds to represent the Australian Netball Diamonds, this cup represents the pinnacle of Australian and New Zealand netball. It is a symbol worth fighting for, with the pride of each nation at stake. To hold this cup is a privilege.

=== Series ===
Series	Winners	Result	Runners up
2010	Australia	2–1	New Zealand
2011	Australia	3–2	New Zealand
2012	New Zealand	2–1	Australia
2013	Australia	4–1	New Zealand
2014	Australia	4–0	New Zealand
2015	Australia	2–2 ^{(Note 1)}	New Zealand
2016	Australia	3–1	New Zealand
2017	Australia	4–0	New Zealand
2018	Australia	3–1	New Zealand
2019	Australia	2–2 ^{(Note 2)}	New Zealand
2020	^{(Note 3)}		
2021	New Zealand	3–1	Australia
2022	Australia	2–2 ^{(Note 4)}	New Zealand
2023	Australia	2–2 ^{(Note 5)}	New Zealand
2024	New Zealand	3–1	Australia
2025	Australia	2–2 ^{(Note 6)}	New Zealand

Notes

- ^1 In 2015, Australia won 202–200 on aggregate.
- ^2 In 2019, Australia won 206–195 on aggregate.
- ^3 The 2020 series was cancelled due to the COVID-19 pandemic.
- ^4 In 2022, Australia won 215–208 on aggregate.
- ^5 In 2023, Australia won 208–195 on aggregate.
- ^6 In 2025, Australia defeated New Zealand 12–11 in a Series Decider.
