= Australia national netball team =

National netball team

Australia
- Nickname(s): Diamonds
- Association: Netball Australia
- Head coach: Stacey Marinkovich
- Asst coach: Nicole Richardson
- Captain: Liz Watson
- Most caps: Liz Ellis (122)
- World ranking: 1
Team colours	Alternate

First international
- Australia 40–11 New Zealand (Royal Park, Melbourne, 20 August 1938)

Largest win
- Australia 113–12 Singapore (Sydney, 5 July 1991)

Largest defeat
- New Zealand 61–36 Australia (The Trusts Arena, 29 October 2005)

Netball World Cup
- Appearances: 16 (Debuted in 1963)
- 2023 placing: 1st
- Titles won: 12

Commonwealth Games
- Appearances: 7 (Debuted in 1990)
- 2022 placing: 1st
- Best result: First (1998, 2002, 2014, 2022)

The Australia national netball team, also known as the Australian Diamonds, represent Netball Australia in international netball tournaments such as the Netball World Cup, the Commonwealth Games, the Constellation Cup, the Netball Quad Series and the Fast5 Netball World Series. They have also represented Australia at the World Games. Australia made their Test debut in 1938. As of 2023, Australia have been World champions on 12 occasions and Commonwealth champions on 4 occasions. They are regularly ranked number one in the World Netball Rankings.

== History ==
=== Early years ===
On 20 August 1938, at Royal Park, Melbourne, Australia defeated New Zealand 40–11. This was the first netball Test between Australia and New Zealand. It was also the world's first international netball match. The Australia team included Lorna McConchie and the umpires included Anne Clark. Australia were due to tour New Zealand in 1940. However the tour was cancelled due to the outbreak of World War II. In 1948, an Australia team eventually toured New Zealand for the first time, winning all three test matches. The Australia team included Myrtle Craddock. In 1956, with a team coached by McConchie and captained by Pat McCarthy, Australia toured England, Scotland and Ceylon. During the tour Australia played their first tests against Ceylon, Scotland and England.

=== Rivalry with New Zealand ===
One of Australia's main rivals in international netball is New Zealand. Between 1963 and 2015, the two teams dominated the World Netball Championships and Commonwealth Games tournaments. Since 2010 the two teams have also competed for the Constellation Cup. Notable and memorable clashes have included the finals of the 1991, 1999 and 2011 World Netball Championships, the finals of the 2010 and the 2014 Commonwealth Games and the final match of the 2013 Constellation Cup.

== Tournament history ==
=== Netball World Cup ===
Australia has competed at every Netball World Cup since the 1963 inaugural tournament. Between 1963 and 2015, Australia have won 11 championships. With a team coached by Lorna McConchie, captained by Joyce Brown and also featuring Margaret Caldow and Wilma Ritchie, Australia were the inaugural champions after winning all ten matches during the 1963 tournament. In 2005, the 1963 team were inducted into the Sport Australia Hall of Fame. In the 1991 final, Australia defeated reigning champions, New Zealand, 53–52 at a packed Sydney Entertainment Centre. New Zealand held a one point lead at each change, Australia then went ahead with minutes to go. With seconds to spare, Roselee Jencke made a match-saving intercept to ensure a one-goal victory for Australia. The match, which was broadcast live on Network 10, was hailed as one of the greatest netball games ever. Bob Hawke, the Prime Minister of Australia and a lifelong sports enthusiast, called it the best sporting contest he had seen. It was also the first of a hat-trick of World titles for Australia. In 1992, the team and their head coach, Joyce Brown, were all awarded the Medal of the Order of Australia. In 2012 they were inducted into the Sport Australia Hall of Fame. In the 1999 final, Australia were trailing New Zealand 28–34 after three quarters. However, they snatched the title 42–41 with a last minute goal from Sharelle McMahon. The win gave Australia its third straight world title. In 2014, the 1999 team became the third Australia national netball team to be inducted into the Sport Australia Hall of Fame.

Tournaments	Place
1963 World Netball Tournament	1st place, gold medalist(s)
1967 World Netball Tournament	2nd place, silver medalist(s)
1971 World Netball Tournament	1st place, gold medalist(s)
1975 World Netball Tournament	1st place, gold medalist(s)
1979 World Netball Tournament	1st place, gold medalist(s)
1983 World Netball Tournament	1st place, gold medalist(s)
1987 World Netball Tournament	2nd place, silver medalist(s)
1991 World Netball Championships	1st place, gold medalist(s)
1995 World Netball Championships	1st place, gold medalist(s)
1999 World Netball Championships	1st place, gold medalist(s)
2003 World Netball Championships	2nd place, silver medalist(s)
2007 World Netball Championships	1st place, gold medalist(s)
2011 World Netball Championships	1st place, gold medalist(s)
2015 Netball World Cup	1st place, gold medalist(s)
2019 Netball World Cup	2nd place, silver medalist(s)
2023 Netball World Cup	1st place, gold medalist(s)
2027 Netball World Cup	

=== World Games ===
Between 1985 and 1993, Australia competed at the World Games, winning one gold and two silver medals.

Tournaments	Place
1985 World Games	2nd place, silver medalist(s)
1989 World Games	2nd place, silver medalist(s)
1993 World Games	1st place, gold medalist(s)

=== Commonwealth Games ===
Australia has competed at every netball tournament at the Commonwealth Games. In 1990 they defeated New Zealand in a one-off match when netball was a demonstration sport. Between 1998 and 2022 they have played in every tournament final, winning four gold and three silver medals. In 1998, Jill McIntosh guided Australia to the inaugural Commonwealth title after they defeated New Zealand 42–39 in the final. In 2002, Australia defended their title, again after defeating New Zealand in the final, this time courtesy of a Sharelle McMahon goal in double extra time.

During the 2010 Commonwealth Games opening ceremony, McMahon, now team captain, carried the flag for the overall Australia team. In 2014, Australia won their third Commonwealth title after defeating New Zealand 58–40 in the final. Caitlin Bassett scored 49 from 53 at 92% accuracy to clinch the title.

In 2022, the Diamonds also won gold at the Commonwealth Games, defeating Jamaica 55–51. This gold medal was a landmark achievement, as it was Australia's 1000th Commonwealth Games gold medal, making Australia the first nation to reach that milestone.

At the 2026 Commonwealth Games in Glasgow, Australia lost their semi final match against Jamaica 46–45 to miss the gold medal match for the first time at the Commonwealth Games. The team won the bronze medal playoff against England 68–50.

Tournaments	Place
1990 Commonwealth Games	1st
1998 Commonwealth Games	1st place, gold medalist(s)
2002 Commonwealth Games	1st place, gold medalist(s)
2006 Commonwealth Games	2nd place, silver medalist(s)
2010 Commonwealth Games	2nd place, silver medalist(s)
2014 Commonwealth Games	1st place, gold medalist(s)
2018 Commonwealth Games	2nd place, silver medalist(s)
2022 Commonwealth Games	1st place, gold medalist(s)
2026 Commonwealth Games	3rd place, bronze medalist(s)

=== Constellation Cup ===
Since 2010 Australia and New Zealand have competed for the Constellation Cup.

Tournaments	Place
2010 Constellation Cup	1st place, gold medalist(s)
2011 Constellation Cup	1st place, gold medalist(s)
2012 Constellation Cup	2nd place, silver medalist(s)
2013 Constellation Cup	1st place, gold medalist(s)
2014 Constellation Cup	1st place, gold medalist(s)
2015 Constellation Cup	1st place, gold medalist(s)
2016 Constellation Cup	1st place, gold medalist(s)
2017 Constellation Cup	1st place, gold medalist(s)
2018 Constellation Cup	1st place, gold medalist(s)
2019 Constellation Cup	1st place, gold medalist(s)
2021 Constellation Cup	2nd place, silver medalist(s)
2022 Constellation Cup	1st place, gold medalist(s)
2023 Constellation Cup	1st place, gold medalist(s)
2024 Constellation Cup	2nd place, silver medalist(s)
2025 Constellation Cup	1st place, gold medalist(s)

=== Netball Quad Series/Netball Nations Cup ===
Since 2012, Australia have competed in the Netball Quad Series, playing against England, New Zealand and South Africa.

Tournaments	Place
2012 Netball Quad Series	1st place, gold medalist(s)
2016 Netball Quad Series	1st place, gold medalist(s)
2017 Netball Quad Series (January/February)	1st place, gold medalist(s)
2017 Netball Quad Series (August/September)	2nd place, silver medalist(s)
2018 Netball Quad Series (January)	1st place, gold medalist(s)
2018 Netball Quad Series (September)	1st place, gold medalist(s)
2019 Netball Quad Series	1st place, gold medalist(s)
2022 Netball Quad Series	1st place, gold medalist(s)
2023 Netball Quad Series	1st place, gold medalist(s)
2024 Netball Nations Cup	1st place, gold medalist(s)

=== Fast5 Netball World Series ===
When competing at the Fast5 Netball World Series, the team is referred to as the Fast5 Flyers. In 2022, Australia won the series for the first time.

Tournaments	Place
2009 World Netball Series	3rd
2010 World Netball Series	4th
2011 World Netball Series	3rd
2012 Fast5 Netball World Series	6th
2013 Fast5 Netball World Series	2nd
2014 Fast5 Netball World Series	2nd
2016 Fast5 Netball World Series	2nd
2017 Fast5 Netball World Series	3rd
2018 Fast5 Netball World Series	3rd
2022 Fast5 Netball World Series	1st place, gold medalist(s)
2023 Fast5 Netball World Series	1st place, gold medalist(s)
2024 Fast5 Netball World Series	1st place, gold medalist(s)

== Home venues ==
The Diamonds have played their home matches at various home venues around Australia. The courts they most recently used include:

Venue	Tournament
Sydney Super Dome	2015 Netball World Cup; 2019 Constellation Cup
Perth Arena	2019 Constellation Cup
Newcastle Entertainment Centre	2018 Netball Quad Series (September)
John Cain Arena	2016 Fast5 Netball World Series; 2017 Fast5 Netball World Series; 2018 Netball Quad Series (September); 2018 Fast5 Netball World Series
Gold Coast Convention and Exhibition Centre	2018 Commonwealth Games
Coomera Indoor Sports Centre	2018 Commonwealth Games
Adelaide Entertainment Centre	2016 Netball Quad Series
Margaret Court Arena	2016 Netball Quad Series
Brisbane Entertainment Centre	2017 Netball Quad Series (August/September)
AIS Arena	2017 Netball Quad Series (August/September)

== Notable players ==
=== Current squad ===
The current squad was selected for the 2025 Constellation Cup.

Australia roster
Players
Coaches

Name	Pos	DOB	Height	Club	Nat	Caps
Sunday Aryang	GD	25 December 2000 (aged 24)	1.82 m (6 ft 0 in)	West Coast Fever
Kiera Austin	GS, GA, WA	26 August 1997 (aged 28)	1.85 m (6 ft 1 in)	Melbourne Vixens
Courtney Bruce	GK, GD	8 December 1993 (aged 31)	1.89 m (6 ft 2 in)	Sunshine Coast Lightning
Sophie Dwyer	GA	5 December 2001 (aged 23)	1.83 m (6 ft 0 in)	Giants Netball
Ashleigh Ervin	GK, GD	15 May 2003 (aged 22)	1.92 m (6 ft 4 in)	Sunshine Coast Lightning
Sophie Garbin	GS, GA	6 April 1997 (aged 28)	1.84 m (6 ft 0 in)	Melbourne Vixens
Matilda Garrett	GK, GD	11 August 1998 (aged 27)	1.85 m (6 ft 1 in)	Adelaide Thunderbirds
Georgie Horjus	GA, WA	28 January 2002 (aged 23)	1.72 m (5 ft 8 in)	Adelaide Thunderbirds
Sarah Klau	GK, GD	30 September 1994 (aged 31)	1.90 m (6 ft 3 in)	New South Wales Swifts
Cara Koenen	GS, GA	27 February 1996 (aged 29)	1.90 m (6 ft 3 in)	Sunshine Coast Lightning
Kate Moloney (vc)	WD, C, WA	8 January 1993 (aged 32)	1.77 m (5 ft 10 in)	Melbourne Vixens
Hannah Mundy	C, WA, WD	10 June 2001 (aged 24)	1.81 m (5 ft 11 in)	Melbourne Vixens
Amy Parmenter	WD	1 August 1997 (aged 28)	1.76 m (5 ft 9 in)	Melbourne Mavericks
Jamie-Lee Price	WD, C	10 January 1996 (aged 29)	1.79 m (5 ft 10 in)	Melbourne Mavericks
Liz Watson (c)	WA, C	30 March 1994 (aged 30)	1.78 m (5 ft 10 in)	Sunshine Coast Lightning

Head coach

- Stacey Marinkovich

Notes

- (c) – Captain
- (cc) – Co-captain
- (vc) – Vice-captain
- – Injury / maternity leave
- (TRP) – Temporary Replacement Player

=== Notable past players ===
Captains

Award winners, Most capped

== Head coaches ==
Years	Head coaches
1956, 1963	Lorna McConchie
1960	Eunice Gill
1967	Margaret Pewtress
1971, 1979, 1987–1989	Wilma Shakespear
1975, 1983, 1991–1993	Joyce Brown
1985	Pamela Barham
1990	Margaret Corbett
1990	Gaye Teede
1995–2003	Jill McIntosh
2003–2011	Norma Plummer
2011–2020	Lisa Alexander
2020–	Stacey Marinkovich

== Sponsorship ==
Sponsors	Seasons	Notes
Samsung	2017–2019	
Origin Energy	2020–present	

== Honours ==
- Netball World Cup
  - Winners: 1963, 1971, 1975, 1979, 1983, 1991, 1995, 1999, 2007, 2011, 2015, 2023: 12
  - Runners up: 1967, 1987, 2003, 2019: 4
- Commonwealth Games
  - Winners: 1998, 2002, 2014, 2022: 4
  - Runners Up: 2006, 2010, 2018: 3
- Constellation Cup
  - Winners: 2010, 2011, 2013, 2014, 2015, 2016, 2017, 2018, 2019, 2022, 2023: 11
  - Runners Up: 2012, 2021, 2024: 3
- Netball Quad Series/Netball Nations Cup
  - Winners: 2012, 2016, 2017 (I), 2018 (I), 2018 (II), 2019, 2022, 2023, 2024: 9
  - Runners Up: 2017 (II): 1
- World Games
  - Winners: 1993: 1
  - Runners up: 1985, 1989: 2
- Fast5 Netball World Series
  - Winners: 2022, 2023, 2024: 3
  - Runners up: 2013, 2014, 2016: 3
