= Caitlin Bassett (netball) =

Australian netball player (born 1988)

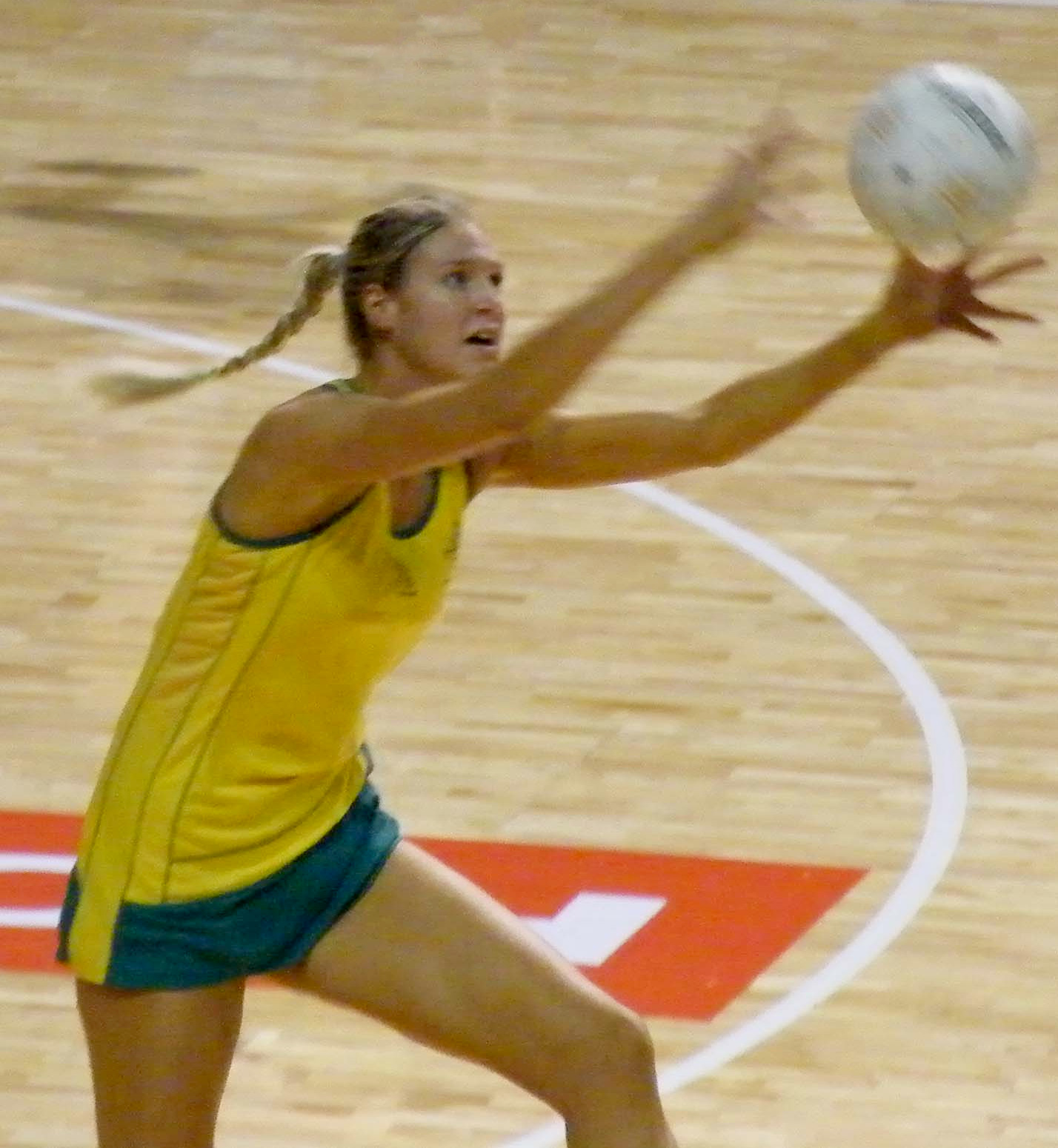
- Bassett in 2008

Personal information
- Full name: Caitlin Bassett
- Born: 23 May 1988 (age 38)
- Height: 196 cm (6 ft 5 in)
- School: Perth Modern School

Netball career
- Playing position: GS
Years	Club team	Apps
2005–2016	West Coast Fever	
2017–2018	Sunshine Coast Lightning	33
2019–2020	Giants Netball	
2021–2022	Waikato Bay of Plenty Magic	
Years	National team	Caps
2008, 2011–2021	Australian Diamonds	100
Medal record
Representing Australia
Netball World Championships
Gold medal – first place	2011 Singapore	Netball
Gold medal – first place	2015 Australia	Netball
Silver medal – second place	2019 Liverpool	Netball
Commonwealth Games
Gold medal – first place	2014 Glasgow	Netball
Silver medal – second place	2018 Gold Coast	Netball
- Updated on 2009-03-11

Caitlin Bassett (born 23 May 1988) is a former Australian netballer, who played for Giants Netball and the Australia national netball team. Between 2017 and 2021 Bassett captained Australia in international netball tests.

== Career ==
Caitlin played in the West Australian Netball League with Demons. Bassett played West Coast Fever from 2005 to 2016, before joining expansion side Sunshine Coast Lightning at the start of the 2017 season in the Suncorp Super Netball league. Bassett previously played for the Perth Orioles in the Commonwealth Bank Trophy from 2005 to 2007. In 2008, she played for one half of a game as a member of the Australian Diamonds team. In 2011 Bassett was part of the 2011 World Championship winning Australian Diamonds Team, featuring in the final against New Zealand. Bassett replaced Cox at half time and led the team to a 58–57 victory over the Silver Ferns. Basset's injection into the game is considered pivotal in this victory, shooting at 90% and scoring the last goal in Extra Time to seal the Championship for her nation.

Bassett joined expansion club Sunshine Coast Lightning in the new Super Netball competition in 2017. She was a critical attacking player in an immensely successful side, winning consecutive premierships and capping off the 2018 premiership with an MVP performance in the Grand Final. Basset then joined Sydney-based Giants Netball on a three-year deal commencing in 2019, a move described as a major coup for the club.

After two seasons at the Giants, Bassett and the club went into negotiations to release her from the final year of her deal so she could pursue playing time at Waikato Bay of Plenty Magic. On 8 October 2020, Bassett signed with the Magic for the 2021 ANZ Premiership season. Bassett was not offered a contract in the Super Netball 2022 season with any of the eight clubs.

Bassett retired from professional netball in February 2022. Bassett took on the role of a Fox Sports commentator not long after her retirement.

== Australian Netball Diamonds ==
Originally from Perth, Western Australia, Bassett made her international debut in 2008. In 2011, she was selected for the Diamonds squad heading for World Netball Championships and the 2011 Holden Netball Test Series. During the World Netball Championships 2011, Bassett missed only 4 goals throughout the whole tournament (151/155). She played a pivotal role in scoring the goal winning point to claim the Diamonds Gold. In the Holden Netball Test Series 2011, Bassett once again was the game saver. In all three test series against New Zealand, Bassett started off on the bench and was brought on at half time for the first and third Tests. She proved to be a match saver and helped the Diamonds close the large margin between the Silver Ferns with her quick and accurate shooting. In 2013 she played 18 out of a possible 20 quarters at goal shooter for the Australian Netball Diamonds in their series win 4–1 against the New Zealand Silver Ferns.

In 2014 she continued at the West Coast Fever. Following the finish of the 2014 ANZ Championship Basset was named in the Australian Netball Diamonds to compete at the 2014 Commonwealth Games who went on to claim gold medal. She again represented the Diamonds at the 2015 Netball World Cup and at the 2018 Commonwealth Games. She was selected in the Australian Diamonds squad for the 2018–19 international season.
