= Lisa Alexander (netball) =

Australian netball coach

Lisa Alexander AM
Personal information
- Occupations: Teacher, Netball coach

Netball career
Coaching career
- Years: Team
- ca. 2002–03: Melbourne Phoenix
- 2006–07: Australia U21
- 2008–11: Adelaide Thunderbirds (asst)
- 2009: World VII (asst)
- 2011–2020: Australia

Lisa Michelle Alexander AM is an Australian netball player and coach. She coached the Australia national netball team from 2011 to 2020.

== Career ==
Alexander is a former Victorian state representative player and a member of the Australian senior wider squad. She was head coach of the Melbourne Phoenix in the Commonwealth Bank Trophy, taking the team to two title wins in 2002 and 2003. She was appointed head coach of the Australian U21 netball team from 2006–07. With the start of the ANZ Championship in 2008, Alexander was appointed assistant coach of the Adelaide Thunderbirds, under head coach Jane Woodlands-Thompson. The Thunderbirds won the ANZ Championship title in 2009. That year she was also an assistant coach for the World 7 team during the 2009 Taini Jamison Trophy Series.

On 11 August 2011, Alexander was named as the head coach of the Australia national netball team. She took over the position from Norma Plummer, who stepped down after the 2011 World Netball Championships to coach the West Coast Fever in the ANZ Championship from 2012. Alexander coached the Diamonds for 102 test matches, becoming the most capped Australian coach of all time. She oversaw gold medal successes at the 2014 Commonwealth Games and 2015 Netball World Cup, as well as silver medals at the 2018 Commonwealth Games and 2019 Netball World Cup. Her Diamonds coaching career ended in March 2020 after Netball Australia declined to extend her contract. As Australian coach Alexander won 83 of her 102 test matches, an impressive 81% winning record.

== Personal accolades ==
On 30 July 2000, she was awarded the Australian Sports Medal for services to netball as a player and in the area of coaching and player development. She was awarded the AIS Sport Performance Awards Coach of the Year for 2014. In the 2021 Australia Day Honours, Alexander was made a Member of the Order of Australia for significant service to netball at the elite level.
