= 2019 New South Wales Swifts season =

NSW Swifts season

New South Wales Swifts
- 2019 season
- Head coach: Briony Akle
- Asst. coach: Anita Keelan
- Manager: Dani Mace
- Captain: Maddy Proud
- Vice-captain: Paige Hadley
- Main venue: QuayCentre; Qudos Bank Arena

Season results
- Regular season: 2nd
- Finals placing: Champions
- Team colours

New South Wales Swifts seasons
- ← 2018 2020 →

The 2019 New South Wales Swifts season saw New South Wales Swifts compete in the 2019 Suncorp Super Netball season. Briony Akle guided Swifts to their second premiership. Despite losing their new captain, Maddy Proud, Kate Eddy and Lauren Moore to season-ending injuries, Swifts finished the regular season in second place. In the major semi-final, they lost to Sunshine Coast Lightning. However, they then defeated Melbourne Vixens in the preliminary final to qualify for the grand final where they faced Lightning again. Lightning were the champions in both 2017 and 2018 and had finished the 2019 regular season as minor premiers. As a result, Lightning started the grand final as favorites. Meanwhile, Swifts had begun the season as underdogs. They were not expected to have a good season. However, in the grand final they defeated Lightning 64–47 to emerge as champions.

== Players ==
=== Player movements ===
Summary of 2019 player movements
▲ Gains	▼ Losses
Elle Bennetts (NNSW Waratahs); Amorangi Malesala (NNSW Waratahs); Tayla Fraser (NNSW Waratahs); Kayla Johnson (Northern Stars); Katrina Rore (Central Pulse)	Claire O'Brien (NNSW Waratahs); Abbey McCulloch (NNSW Waratahs)

=== 2019 roster ===
2019 New South Wales Swifts roster
Players
Coaching staff

Nat.	Name	Position(s)	DoB	Height
(Australia)	Elle Bennetts (TRP)	WA, C	6 September 1989 (aged 29)	1.70 m (5 ft 7 in)
(Australia)	Kate Eddy (injured)	GD, WD, GK	28 December 1996 (aged 22)	1.82 m (6 ft 0 in)
(Australia)	Tayla Fraser (TRP)	WA, C	13 June 1999 (aged 19)	1.72 m (5 ft 8 in)
(Australia)	Sophie Garbin	GA, GS	6 April 1997 (aged 21)	1.84 m (6 ft 0 in)
(Australia)	Paige Hadley (vc)	C, WA, WD	26 August 1992 (aged 26)	1.73 m (5 ft 8 in)
(Australia)	Sophie Halpin	WD, C	16 May 1993 (aged 25)	1.77 m (5 ft 10 in)
(England)	Natalie Haythornthwaite	WA, GA	9 December 1992 (aged 26)	1.74 m (5 ft 9 in)
(England)	Helen Housby	GA, GS, WA	19 January 1995 (aged 24)	1.83 m (6 ft 0 in)
(New Zealand)	Kayla Johnson (TRP)	GD, WD, C	13 February 1992 (aged 27)	1.83 m (6 ft 0 in)
(Australia)	Sarah Klau	GK, GD	30 September 1994 (aged 24)	1.90 m (6 ft 3 in)
(New Zealand)	Amorangi Malesala (TRP)	GS, GA	19 July 1998 (aged 20)	1.79 m (5 ft 10 in)
(Australia)	Lauren Moore (injured)	GK, GD	30 January 1998 (aged 21)	1.84 m (6 ft 0 in)
(Australia)	Maddy Proud (c) (injured)	C, WA	4 December 1993 (aged 25)	1.74 m (5 ft 9 in)
(New Zealand)	Katrina Rore (TRP)	GK, GD, WD	6 May 1987 (aged 31)	1.87 m (6 ft 2 in)
(Australia)	Maddy Turner	GD, WD	17 December 1995 (aged 23)	1.83 m (6 ft 0 in)
(Trinidad and Tobago)	Samantha Wallace	GS, GA	16 January 1994 (aged 25)	1.93 m (6 ft 4 in)

Head coach

- (Australia) Briony Akle

Assistant coach

- (Australia) Anita Keelan

Manager: Dani Mace
Physiotherapist:
Steve Naylor
Strength and conditioning:
Lukas Cannan
Johann Ruys
Performance Analyst:
Bjorn Maddern

Notes

- (c) – Captain
- (cc) – Co-captain
- (vc) – Vice-captain
- – Injury / maternity leave
- (TRP) – Temporary Replacement Player

=== Debutants ===
- Amorangi Malesala made her Swifts debut in Round 6 against Collingwood Magpies.
- Elle Bennetts made her Swifts debut in Round 7 against Giants Netball.
- Tayla Fraser made her Swifts debut in Round 10 against West Coast Fever.
- Kayla Johnson made her Swifts debut in Round 10 against West Coast Fever.
- Katrina Rore made her Swifts debut in Round 11 against Sunshine Coast Lightning.

== #TeamGirls Cup ==
In the 2019 #TeamGirls Cup, Swifts defeated Giants Netball, West Coast Fever and Queensland Firebirds and eventually finished fifth.

=== Pool B Fixtures ===
Pos	Team	Pld	W	D	L	GF	GA	GD	Pts	Qualification
1	Collingwood Magpies	3	2	0	1	128	103	+25	8	Final
2	Giants Netball	3	2	0	1	119	112	+7	8	Classification matches
3	New South Wales Swifts	3	2	0	1	105	108	−3	8	Classification matches
4	West Coast Fever	3	0	0	3	80	109	−29	0	Classification matches

Updated to match(es) played on 9 March 2019. Source: SSN

8 March 2019; 18:00	Report; Stats	New South Wales Swifts	47 – 33	Giants Netball	Queensland State Netball Centre
8 March 2019; 18:00	Report; Stats	Housby 20/23 (87%); Wallace 16/19 (84%); Garbin 11/14 (79%)		Harten 22/24 (92%); Marshall 6/8 (75%); Austin 5/8 (63%)	Queensland State Netball Centre

9 March 2019; 11:00	Report; Stats	New South Wales Swifts	29 – 51	Collingwood Magpies	Queensland State Netball Centre
9 March 2019; 11:00	Report; Stats	Wallace 17/21 (81%); Haythornthwaite 6/6 (100%); Garbin 6/8 (75%)		Nelson 33/35 (94%); Sinclair 10/12 (83%); Medhurst 8/10 (80%)	Queensland State Netball Centre

9 March 2019; 17:00	Report; Stats	West Coast Fever	24 – 29	New South Wales Swifts	Queensland State Netball Centre
9 March 2019; 17:00	Report; Stats	Stanton 17/23 (74%); Cosh 6/7 (86%); Teague-Neeld 1/5 (20%)		Garbin 13/15 (87%); Haythornthwaite 9/14 (64%); Samantha Wallace 7/8 (88%)	Queensland State Netball Centre

=== 5th/6th play off ===
10 March 2019; 10:30	Report; Stats	Queensland Firebirds	41 – 42	New South Wales Swifts	Queensland State Netball Centre
10 March 2019; 10:30	Report; Stats	Aiken 24/30 (80%); Tippett 17/17 (100%)		Wallace 30/30 (100%); Garbin 12/16 (75%)	Queensland State Netball Centre

== Regular season ==
=== Fixtures and results ===
Sun 28 Apr	Giants Netball	56 – 63	New South Wales Swifts	Qudos Bank Arena
1.00pm	Bassett 28/36 (78%); Harten 25/31 (81%); Austin 3/3 (100%)	Report; Stats	Wallace 46/49 (94%); Housby 17/26 (65%)

Sun 5 May	New South Wales Swifts	61 – 43	Adelaide Thunderbirds	QuayCentre
3.00pm	Wallace 31/31 (100%); Housby 24/28 (86%); Garbin 6/6 (100%)	Report; Stats	Glasgow 24/28 (86%); Folau 19/23 (83%); Lange 0/1 (0%)

Sun 12 May	New South Wales Swifts	80 – 66	West Coast Fever	QuayCentre
1.00pm	Wallace 62/66 (94%); Housby 18/18 (100%)	Report; Stats	Fowler 48/50 (96%); Stanton 18/23 (78%)

Sat 18 May	New South Wales Swifts	57 – 59	Sunshine Coast Lightning	QuayCentre
1.00pm	Wallace 33/36 (92%); Housby 24/26 (92%)	Report; Stats	Proscovia 27/29 (93%); Wood 14/19 (74%); Koenan 18/20 (90%)

Sun 26 May	Melbourne Vixens	50 – 60	New South Wales Swifts	Margaret Court Arena
1.00pm	Thwaites 28/32 (88%); Philip 18/22 (82%); Venter 4/4 (100%)	Report; Stats	Wallace 45/47 (96%); Housby 15/18 (83%)

Sun 2 Jun	New South Wales Swifts	68 – 52	Collingwood Magpies	Qudos Bank Arena
1.00pm	Wallace 54/57 (95%); Housby 14/19 (74%)	Report; Stats	Nelson 41/44 (93%); Medhurst 9/10 (90%); Sinclair 2/3 (67%)

Sun 9 Jun	Queensland Firebirds	46 – 68	New South Wales Swifts	Queensland State Netball Centre
1.00pm	Potgieter 24/24 (100%); Tippett 17/18 (94%); Latu-Meafou 5/7 (71%)	Report; Stats	Wallace 41/44 (93%); Housby 27/31 (87%)

Sun 16 Jun	New South Wales Swifts	59 – 55	Giants Netball	Qudos Bank Arena
3.00pm	Wallace 48/50 (96%); Housby 11/12 (92%)	Report; Stats	Bassett 34/36 (94%); Harten 21/24 (88%)

Sun 23 Jun	Adelaide Thunderbirds	51 – 51	New South Wales Swifts	Adelaide Entertainment Centre
12.30pm	Folau 26/36 (72%); Glasgow 23/25 (92%); Hodges 2/2 (100%)	Report; Stats	Garbin 25/29 (86%); Housby 21/26 (81%); Wallace 5/7 (71%)

Sat 27 Jul	West Coast Fever	49 – 53	New South Wales Swifts	RAC Arena
6.00pm	Fowler 43/47 (91%); Teague-Neeld 6/12 (50%)	Report; Stats	Wallace 24/29 (83%); Housby 22/28 (79%); Garbin 7/8 (88%)

Sat 3 Aug	Sunshine Coast Lightning	50 – 48	New South Wales Swifts	USC Stadium
7.00pm	Koenen 26/30 (87%); Wood 13/20 (65%); Proscovia 11/11 (100%)	Report; Stats	Garbin 12/15 (80%); Wallace 36/37 (97%)

Sat 10 Aug	New South Wales Swifts	57 – 51	Melbourne Vixens	QuayCentre
7.00pm	Garbin 12/18 (67%); Wallace 45/49 (92%)	Report; Stats	Philip 24/30 (80%); Thwaites 9/11 (82%); Kumwenda 18/20 (90%)

Sat 17 Aug	Collingwood Magpies	64 – 56	New South Wales Swifts	Silverdome
3.00pm	Nelson 52/54 (96%); Medhurst 12/14 (86%)	Report; Stats	Wallace 39/43 (91%); Haythornthwaite 9/10 (90%); Garbin 8/10 (80%)

Sat 24 Aug	New South Wales Swifts	64 – 63	Queensland Firebirds	Qudos Bank Arena
5.00pm	Wallace 43/45 (96%); Housby 16/18 (89%); Garbin 5/5 (100%)	Report; Stats	Tippett 33/35 (94%); Aiken 30/35 (86%)

=== Standings ===
2019 Suncorp Super Netball ladder
Pos	Team	P	W	D	L	GF	GA	%	BP	PTS
1	Sunshine Coast Lightning	14	12	0	2	855	759	112.65	33	81
2	New South Wales Swifts	14	10	1	3	845	755	111.92	36	78
3	Melbourne Vixens	14	8	1	5	836	775	107.87	29	63
4	Collingwood Magpies	14	7	2	5	788	771	102.20	27	59
5	Giants Netball	14	7	1	6	834	821	101.58	29	59
6	West Coast Fever	14	2	3	9	821	904	90.82	18	33
7	Adelaide Thunderbirds	14	3	2	9	708	803	88.17	14	30
8	Queensland Firebirds	14	1	2	11	815	914	89.17	18	26
Last updated: 25 August 2019 — Source

== Play-offs ==
=== Major semi-final ===
Sat 31 Aug; 3.00pm	Report; Stats	Sunshine Coast Lightning	58–48	New South Wales Swifts	USC Stadium	Nine
Sat 31 Aug; 3.00pm	Report; Stats	Scoring by quarter: 13–14, 14–11, 18–10, 13–13			USC Stadium	Nine
Sat 31 Aug; 3.00pm	Report; Stats	Koenen 30/32 (94%); Wood 22/29 (76%); Proscovia 6/7 (86%)		Housby 16/18 (89%); Garbin 16/18 (89%); Wallace 16/19 (84%)	USC Stadium	Nine

=== Preliminary final ===
Sun 8 Sep; 1.00pm	Report; Stats	New South Wales Swifts	60–47	Melbourne Vixens	Quaycentre	Nine
Sun 8 Sep; 1.00pm	Report; Stats	Scoring by quarter: 19–12, 14–10, 11–15, 16–10			Quaycentre	Nine
Sun 8 Sep; 1.00pm	Report; Stats	Wallace 40/42 (95%); Housby 19/21 (90%); Garbin 1/1 (100%)		Kumwenda 22/26 (85%); Philip 21/25 (84%); Thwaites 4/7 (57%)	Quaycentre	Nine

=== Grand Final ===
Sun 15 Sep; 1.00pm	Report; Stats	Sunshine Coast Lightning	47–64	New South Wales Swifts	Brisbane Entertainment Centre	Nine
Sun 15 Sep; 1.00pm	Report; Stats	Scoring by quarter: 12–16, 11–15, 13–15, 11–18			Brisbane Entertainment Centre	Nine
Sun 15 Sep; 1.00pm	Report; Stats	Koenen 23/27 (85%); Proscovia 16/18 (89%); Wood 8/14 (57%)		Wallace 40/44 (91%); Housby 18/22 (82%); Garbin 6/7 (86%)	Brisbane Entertainment Centre	Nine

== Award winners ==
Award	Winner
Grand Final MVP	Samantha Wallace
Joyce Brown Coach of the Year	Briony Akle
QBE NSW Swifts MVP	Samantha Wallace
NSW Swifts Members' Player of the Year	Paige Hadley
NSW Swifts Players' Player of the Year	Sophie Garbin/Maddy Turner
NSW Swifts Coaches' Player Award	Paige Hadley
