= 2016 New South Wales Swifts season =

NSW Swifts season

New South Wales Swifts
- 2016 season
- Head coach: Rob Wright
- Asst. coach: Megan Anderson; Anita Keelan
- Manager: Gail Eckert
- Captain: Kimberlee Green
- Vice-captain: Laura Langman
- Main venue: Sydney Olympic Park Sports Centre

Season results
- Wins–losses: 12–4 (1 draw)
- Regular season: 2nd (Australian Conference)
- Finals placing: 2nd
- Team colours

New South Wales Swifts seasons
- ← 2015 2017 →

The 2016 New South Wales Swifts season saw New South Wales Swifts compete in the 2016 ANZ Championship. Swifts finished the regular season in second place in the Australian Conference. In the play-offs, they defeated Melbourne Vixens and Waikato Bay of Plenty Magic but lost twice to Queensland Firebirds, including 69–67 in the grand final.

== Players ==
=== Player movements ===
Summary of 2015 player movements
▲ Gains	▼ Losses
Kaitlyn Bryce (NNSW Waratahs); Laura Langman (Northern Mystics); Lauren Moore (NNSW Waratahs); Amy Sommerville (NNSW Waratahs); Maddy Turner (Southern Force)	Jade Clarke (Adelaide Thunderbirds); Julie Corletto; Taylah Davies (NNSW Waratahs); Erin Hoare; Micaela Wilson

=== 2016 roster ===
2016 New South Wales Swifts roster
Players
Coaching staff

Nat.	Name	Position(s)	DoB	Height
(Australia)	Kaitlyn Bryce	WA, C	7 July 1995 (aged 20)	1.70 m (5 ft 7 in)
(Australia)	Kimberlee Green (c)	C, WA	5 March 1986 (aged 30)	1.76 m (5 ft 9 in)
(Australia)	Paige Hadley	C, WA, WD	26 August 1992 (aged 23)	1.73 m (5 ft 8 in)
(New Zealand)	Laura Langman (vc)	WD, C, WA	16 April 1986 (aged 29)	1.73 m (5 ft 8 in)
(Australia)	Sharni Layton	GK, GD, WD	6 June 1988 (aged 27)	1.88 m (6 ft 2 in)
(Australia)	Abbey McCulloch	WD, C, GD	12 February 1990 (aged 26)	1.78 m (5 ft 10 in)
(Australia)	Lauren Moore	GK, GD	30 January 1998 (aged 18)	1.84 m (6 ft 0 in)
(Australia)	Susan Pettitt	GA, GS	23 March 1984 (aged 32)	1.80 m (5 ft 11 in)
(Australia)	Amy Sommerville	GS, GA	21 March 1993 (aged 23)	1.80 m (5 ft 11 in)
(Australia)	Caitlin Thwaites	GS, GA	29 December 1986 (aged 29)	1.88 m (6 ft 2 in)
(Australia)	Maddy Turner	GD, WD	17 December 1995 (aged 20)	1.83 m (6 ft 0 in)
(Australia)	Stephanie Wood	GA, WA	28 November 1991 (aged 24)	1.75 m (5 ft 9 in)

Head coach

- (Australia) Rob Wright

Assistant coach

- (Australia) Megan Anderson
  Anita Keelan

Manager: Gail Eckert
Physiotherapist:
Paula Peralta
Daniel Vukovic
Strength and conditioning:
Jason Howell
Lukas Cannan
Performance Analyst:
Bjorn Maddern
Doctor:
Dr Grace Bryant OAM
Sport Psychologist:
Dr Michael Martin
Dietician:
Caitlin Reid

Notes

- (c) – Captain
- (cc) – Co-captain
- (vc) – Vice-captain
- – Injury / maternity leave
- (TRP) – Temporary Replacement Player

=== Debutants ===
- Laura Langman made her Swifts debut in a preseason friendly against Waikato Bay of Plenty Magic.
- Lauren Moore, Amy Sommerville and Maddy Turner made their Swifts and ANZ Championship debuts in Round 1 against Melbourne Vixens.
- Kaitlyn Bryce made her Swifts and ANZ Championship debut in Round 2 against Waikato Bay of Plenty Magic.

== Regular season ==
In Round 6, Swifts defeated Central Pulse 79–41. This was both the Swifts highest ever score and their largest winning margin. In Round 9, they hosted Queensland Firebirds at the Qudos Bank Arena in front of 13,314 fans, one of the largest crowds attendance in the history of the ANZ Championship. Swifts maintained an undefeated record at Sydney Olympic Park Sports Centre which contributed to their ten wins, two losses and one draw during the regular season.

=== Fixtures and results ===
Sun 3 April	New South Wales Swifts	57 - 42	Melbourne Vixens	Sydney Olympic Park Sports Centre
12.18 PM (AEST)

Sat 9 April	New South Wales Swifts	78 - 50	Waikato Bay of Plenty Magic	Sydney Olympic Park Sports Centre
5:18 PM (AEST)

Sun 17 April	New South Wales Swifts	68 - 44	Adelaide Thunderbirds	Sydney Olympic Park Sports Centre
12.18 PM (AEST)

Sun 24 April	West Coast Fever	52 - 63	New South Wales Swifts	HBF Stadium
10.18 AM (AWST)

Sat 30 April	Queensland Firebirds	61 - 51	New South Wales Swifts	Brisbane Entertainment Centre
5:18 PM (AEST)

Sun 8 May	New South Wales Swifts	79 - 41	Central Pulse	Sydney Olympic Park Sports Centre
12:18 PM (AEST)

Sun 15 May	Melbourne Vixens	51 - 59	New South Wales Swifts	Hisense Arena
12:18 PM (AEST)

Sun 22 May	Canterbury Tactix	52 - 73	New South Wales Swifts	Horncastle Arena
4:10 PM (NZST)

Sun 29 May	New South Wales Swifts	58 - 54	Queensland Firebirds	Qudos Bank Arena
12:18 PM (AEST)				Attendance: 13,314

Sat 11 June	New South Wales Swifts	57 - 58	West Coast Fever	Newcastle Entertainment Centre
5:48 PM (AEST)

Sat 18 June	Adelaide Thunderbirds	53 - 67	New South Wales Swifts	Titanium Security Arena
4:48 PM (ACST)

Sun 26 June	Northern Mystics	53 - 59	New South Wales Swifts	The Trusts Arena
4:10 PM (NZST)

Sat 2 July	New South Wales Swifts	59 - 59	Southern Steel	Sydney Olympic Park Sports Centre
5:18 PM (AEST)

=== Final standings ===
2016 Australian Conference
Pos	Team	Pld	W	D	L	GF	GA	GD	G%	Pts
1	Queensland Firebirds	13	11	2	0	796	656	140	121.3%	22
2	New South Wales Swifts	13	10	2	1	828	670	158	123.6%	21
3	Melbourne Vixens	13	8	5	0	731	679	52	107.7%	16
4	West Coast Fever	13	7	6	0	756	707	49	106.9%	14
5	Adelaide Thunderbirds	13	2	11	0	660	775	-115	85.2%	4
2016 New Zealand Conference
Pos	Team	Pld	W	D	L	GF	GA	GD	G%	Pts
1	Southern Steel	13	11	0	2	852	732	120	116.4%	24
2	Waikato Bay of Plenty Magic	13	6	7	0	665	755	-90	88.1%	12
3	Northern Mystics	13	3	9	1	674	743	-69	90.7%	7
5	Mainland Tactix	13	2	10	1	708	825	-117	85.8%	5
4	Central Pulse	13	2	10	1	676	804	-128	84.1%	5

Qualified for Conference finals
Qualified for Elimination finals

- Pld = Games played
- W = Win (2 points)
- D = Draw (1 points)
- L = Loss (0 points)
- GF = Goals For
- GA = Goals Against
- GD = Goals Difference (= GF−GA)
- G% = Goal percentage (= 100 × GF/GA)
- Pts = Points

== Play-offs ==
=== Elimination Final ===
Australian Conference

10 July 2016; 5.18 pm (AEST)	Stats	New South Wales Swifts	67–53	Melbourne Vixens	Sydney Olympic Park Sports Centre
10 July 2016; 5.18 pm (AEST)	Stats	Scoring by quarter: 17-13, 20-12, 16-10, 14-18			Sydney Olympic Park Sports Centre
10 July 2016; 5.18 pm (AEST)	Stats	Caitlin Thwaites 40/44 (91%); Susan Pettitt 23/24 (96%); Stephanie Wood 4/7 (57%)		Emma Ryde; Alice Teague-Neeld; Kimberly Commane	Sydney Olympic Park Sports Centre

=== Conference Finals ===
Australian Conference

18 July 2016; 7.18 (AEST)	Report; Stats	Queensland Firebirds	63–52	New South Wales Swifts	Brisbane Entertainment Centre
18 July 2016; 7.18 (AEST)	Report; Stats	Scoring by quarter: 16-12, 16-15, 15-10, 16-15			Brisbane Entertainment Centre

=== Semi-final ===
25 July 2016; 7.45 pm (NZST)	Report; Stats	Waikato Bay of Plenty Magic	45–64	New South Wales Swifts	Claudelands Arena
25 July 2016; 7.45 pm (NZST)	Report; Stats	Scoring by quarter: 14 - 16, 10 - 17, 7 - 16, 14 - 15			Claudelands Arena

=== Grand Final ===
31 July 2016; 12.10 pm (AEST)	Stats	Queensland Firebirds	69–67	New South Wales Swifts	ET	Brisbane Entertainment Centre	Fox Sports; Sky Sport
31 July 2016; 12.10 pm (AEST)	Stats	Scoring by quarter: 12-15, 17-12, 12-15, 13-12, ET: 15-13			ET	Brisbane Entertainment Centre	Fox Sports; Sky Sport
31 July 2016; 12.10 pm (AEST)	Stats	Scoring by half: 29-27, 25-27 ET: 15-13			ET	Brisbane Entertainment Centre	Fox Sports; Sky Sport

== Award winners ==
Award	Winner
Australian ANZ Championship Player of the Year	Sharni Layton
QBE NSW Swifts MVP	Laura Langman
NSW Swifts Members' Player of the Year	Sharni Layton
NSW Swifts Players' Player of the Year	Amy Sommerville
NSW Swifts Coaches' Player Award	Paige Hadley/Stephanie Wood
