= 2016 Southern Steel season =

Southern Steel season

Southern Steel
- 2016 season
- Head coach: Noeline Taurua
- Asst. coach: Reinga Te Huia
- Manager: Sam Stephens
- Captain: Wendy Frew
- Main venue: Stadium Southland

Season results
- Wins–losses: 11–4
- Regular season: 1st (New Zealand Conference)
- Finals placing: Semi-finalists
- Team colours

Southern Steel seasons
- ← 2015 2017 →

The 2016 Southern Steel season saw the Southern Steel netball team compete in the 2016 ANZ Championship. With a team coached by Noeline Taurua, captained by Wendy Frew and featuring Jhaniele Fowler-Reid, Steel finished the season as minor premiers. However they subsequently lost the New Zealand Conference Final to Waikato Bay of Plenty Magic and were defeated in the semi-finals by Queensland Firebirds.

== Players ==
=== Player movements ===
Gains and losses
▲ Gains	▼ Losses
Abby Erwood; Te Huinga Reo Selby-Rickit (Central Pulse); Jamie Hume	Phoenix Karaka (Central Pulse); Katarina Cooper; Sophia Fenwick

=== 2016 roster ===
2016 Southern Steel roster
Players
Coaching staff

Nat.	Name	Position(s)	DoB	Height
(New Zealand)	Gina Crampton	WA, C	7 December 1991 (aged 24)	1.74 m (5 ft 9 in)
(New Zealand)	Abby Erwood	GA, C, WA	18 April 1997 (aged 18)	1.83 m (6 ft 0 in)
(Jamaica)	Jhaniele Fowler-Reid	GS	21 July 1989 (aged 26)	1.96 m (6 ft 5 in)
(New Zealand)	Shannon Francois (vc)	WA, C, GA	12 October 1990 (aged 25)	1.76 m (5 ft 9 in)
(New Zealand)	Wendy Frew (c)	WD, C, WA	15 October 1984 (aged 31)	1.74 m (5 ft 9 in)
(New Zealand)	Jamie Hume	GA, GS	22 March 1996 (aged 20)	1.82 m (6 ft 0 in)
(New Zealand)	Brooke Leaver	GS, GA	17 December 1993 (aged 22)	1.83 m (6 ft 0 in)
(New Zealand)	Stacey Peeters			–
(New Zealand)	Storm Purvis	GD, GK	20 April 1993 (aged 22)	1.86 m (6 ft 1 in)
(New Zealand)	Te Huinga Reo Selby-Rickit	GK, GD	3 April 1989 (aged 26)	1.84 m (6 ft 0 in)
(New Zealand)	Te Paea Selby-Rickit	GS, GA	14 January 1992 (aged 24)	1.93 m (6 ft 4 in)
(New Zealand)	Jane Watson	GK, GD, WD	7 March 1990 (aged 26)	1.81 m (5 ft 11 in)

Head coach

- (New Zealand) Noeline Taurua

Assistant coach

- Reinga Te Huia

Manager: Sam Stephens
Physiotherapist:
Corina Ngatuere
Brett Woodley
Strength and conditioning:
Mike Jacob
Henry Cheetham
Nutritionist:
Sara Richardson
Mental Skills Coach:
Jason McKenzie
Sports Science/Video Analysis:
Hayden Croft

Notes

- (c) – Captain
- (cc) – Co-captain
- (vc) – Vice-captain
- – Injury / maternity leave
- (TRP) – Temporary Replacement Player

== Regular season ==
=== Fixtures and results ===
Round 1

Fri 1 April	Northern Mystics	57 - 58	Southern Steel	The Trusts Arena
7:10 PM (NZDT)	Maria Tutaia 22/30 (73%); Cathrine Tuivaiti 35/40 (88%)	Report	Jhaniele Fowler-Reid 48/56 (86%); Te Paea Selby-Rickit 9/14 (64%); Brooke Leaver 1/1 (100%)

Round 2

Sun 10 April	Southern Steel	58 - 58	Mainland Tactix	Stadium Southland
4:10 PM (NZST)	Jhaniele Fowler-Reid 50/56 (89%); Te Paea Selby-Rickit 8/11 (73%); Brooke Leaver 0/1 (0%)	Report	Mwai Kumwenda 35/38 (92%); Bailey Mes 22/30 (73%); Gemma Hazeldine 1/2 (50%)

Round 3

Sun 17 April	Waikato Bay of Plenty Magic	53 - 63	Southern Steel	Energy Events Centre
4.10 PM (NZST)	Joanne Harten 20/27 (74%); Malia Paseka 31/45 (69%); Ellen Halpenny 2/2 (100%)	Report	Jhaniele Fowler-Reid 44/47 (94%); Te Paea Selby-Rickit 19/24 (79%)

Round 4

Sun 24 April	Southern Steel	67 - 54	Central Pulse	Stadium Southland
4.10 PM (NZST)	Jhaniele Fowler-Reid 41/47 (87%); Te Paea Selby-Rickit 25/28 (89%); Brooke Leaver 1/3 (33%)	Report	Ameliaranne Wells 21/25 (84%); Maia Wilson 33/35 (94%)

Round 5

Sat 30 April	Southern Steel	69 - 62	West Coast Fever	Stadium Southland
4:10 PM (NZST)	Jhaniele Fowler-Reid 59/65 (91%); Te Paea Selby-Rickit 10/13 (77%)	Report	Caitlin Bassett 44/48 (92%); Natalie Medhurst 18/19 (95%)

Round 6

Sun 8 May	Adelaide Thunderbirds	54 - 69	Southern Steel	Priceline Stadium
1:48 PM (ACST)	Carla Borrego 40/50 (80%); Erin Bell 7/10 (70%); Stephanie Puopolo 7/9 (78%)	Report	Jhaniele Fowler-Reid 60/70 (86%); Te Paea Selby-Rickit 6/6 (100%); Brooke Leaver 3/9 (33%)

Round 7

Southern Steel received a bye.

Round 8

Mon 23 May	Central Pulse	63 - 67	Southern Steel	TSB Bank Arena
7:40 PM (NZST)	Ameliaranne Wells 26/28 (93%); Maia Wilson 37/40 (93%)	Report	Jhaniele Fowler-Reid 54/56 (96%); Te Paea Selby-Rickit 13/21 (62%)

Round 9

Sun 29 May	Southern Steel	66 - 60	Northern Mystics	Edgar Centre
4:10 PM (NZST)	Jhaniele Fowler-Reid 56/69 (81%); Te Paea Selby-Rickit 10/16 (63%)	Report	Maria Tutaia 13/21 (62%); Cathrine Tuivaiti 47/49 (96%)

Round 10

Sun 5 June	Mainland Tactix	51 - 81	Southern Steel	Horncastle Arena
4:10 PM (NZST)	Mwai Kumwenda 24/26 (92%); Bailey Mes 24/29 (83%); Gemma Hazeldine 3/4 (75%)	Report	Jhaniele Fowler-Reid 64/66 (97%); Te Paea Selby-Rickit 13/18 (72%); Brooke Leaver 4/6 (67%)

Round 11

Sat 11 June	Southern Steel	66 - 51	Queensland Firebirds	Edgar Centre
4:10 PM (NZST)	Jhaniele Fowler-Reid 51/57 (89%); Te Paea Selby-Rickit 15/17 (88%); Brooke Leaver 0/1 (0%)	Report	Romelda Aiken 27/32 (84%); Gretel Tippett 16/19 (84%); Beryl Friday 8/9 (89%)

Round 12

Sun 19 June	Southern Steel	64 - 54	Waikato Bay of Plenty Magic	Stadium Southland
4:10 PM (NZST)	Jhaniele Fowler-Reid 55/61 (90%); Te Paea Selby-Rickit 9/15 (60%)	Report; Stats	Joanne Harten 37/45 (82%); Ellen Halpenny 1/6 (17%); Paula Griffin 16/21 (76%)

Round 13

Sat 25 June	Southern Steel	65 - 56	Melbourne Vixens	Stadium Southland
4:10 PM (NZST)	Jhaniele Fowler-Reid 49/54 (91%); Te Paea Selby-Rickit 16/19 (84%)	Report	Alice Teague-Neeld 23/27 (85%); Karyn Bailey 13/15 (87%); Kimberley Commane 4/5 (80%); Emma Ryde 16/23 (70%)

Round 14

Sat 2 July	New South Wales Swifts	59 - 59	Southern Steel	Sydney Olympic Park Sports Centre
5:18 PM (AEST)	Susan Pettitt 30/32 (94%); Caitlin Thwaites 29/31 (94%)	Report	Jhaniele Fowler-Reid 50/52 (96%); Te Paea Selby-Rickit 9/12 (75%)

=== Final standings ===
2016 Australian Conference
Pos	Team	Pld	W	D	L	GF	GA	GD	G%	Pts
1	Queensland Firebirds	13	11	2	0	796	656	140	121.3%	22
2	New South Wales Swifts	13	10	2	1	828	670	158	123.6%	21
3	Melbourne Vixens	13	8	5	0	731	679	52	107.7%	16
4	West Coast Fever	13	7	6	0	756	707	49	106.9%	14
5	Adelaide Thunderbirds	13	2	11	0	660	775	-115	85.2%	4
2016 New Zealand Conference
Pos	Team	Pld	W	D	L	GF	GA	GD	G%	Pts
1	Southern Steel	13	11	0	2	852	732	120	116.4%	24
2	Waikato Bay of Plenty Magic	13	6	7	0	665	755	-90	88.1%	12
3	Northern Mystics	13	3	9	1	674	743	-69	90.7%	7
5	Mainland Tactix	13	2	10	1	708	825	-117	85.8%	5
4	Central Pulse	13	2	10	1	676	804	-128	84.1%	5

Qualified for Conference finals
Qualified for Elimination finals

- Pld = Games played
- W = Win (2 points)
- D = Draw (1 points)
- L = Loss (0 points)
- GF = Goals For
- GA = Goals Against
- GD = Goals Difference (= GF−GA)
- G% = Goal percentage (= 100 × GF/GA)
- Pts = Points

== Finals series ==
=== New Zealand Conference Final ===
17 July 2016; 4.15 pm (NZST)	Stats	Southern Steel	57–59	Waikato Bay of Plenty Magic	Stadium Southland
17 July 2016; 4.15 pm (NZST)	Stats	Scoring by quarter: 13 -19, 14 -16, 15-12, 15-12			Stadium Southland
17 July 2016; 4.15 pm (NZST)	Stats	Jhaniele Fowler-Reid 47/53 (89%); Te Paea Selby-Rickit 10/11 (91%)		Joanne Harten 46/52 (88%); Ellen Halpenny 13/17 (76%)	Stadium Southland

=== Semi-finals ===
24 July 2016; 12.18 pm (AEST)	Stats	Queensland Firebirds	67–64	Southern Steel	Brisbane Entertainment Centre
24 July 2016; 12.18 pm (AEST)	Stats	Scoring by quarter: 19 - 16, 13 - 19, 15 - 14, 20 -15			Brisbane Entertainment Centre
24 July 2016; 12.18 pm (AEST)	Stats	Romelda Aiken 57/68 (84%); Gretel Tippett 10/13 (77%)		Jhaniele Fowler-Reid 51/52 (98%); Te Paea Selby-Rickit 13/20 (65%)	Brisbane Entertainment Centre

== Award winners ==
=== ANZ Championship awards ===
Award	Winner
ANZ Championship MVP (New Zealand Conference)	Jhaniele Fowler-Reid

=== New Zealand Netball Awards ===
Award	Winner
New Zealand ANZ Championship Player of the Year	Gina Crampton

== National Netball League ==
With a team captained by Hayley Crofts, Steel's reserve team, Netball South won the inaugural National Netball League title after defeating Central Zone 51–46 in the grand final at The Trusts Arena. At the 2016 New Zealand Netball Awards, Netball South winning the inaugural title was named Moment of the Year and head coach, Lauren Piebenga, was named National Coach of the Year.
