= 2016 ANZ Championship season =

Netball league season

- League: ANZ Championship
- Sport: Netball
- Duration: 1 April – 4 July 2016
- Teams: 10
- TV partner(s): Fox Sports (Australia); Sky Sport (New Zealand); Network Ten; One
- Champions: Queensland Firebirds
- Winners: Australian Conference; Queensland Firebirds; New Zealand Conference; Waikato Bay of Plenty Magic; Challenge Trophy; Queensland Firebirds
- Runners-up: New South Wales Swifts
- Minor premiers: Southern Steel
- Season MVP: Madison Robinson (Vixens); Jhaniele Fowler-Reid (Steel)

Finals
- Champions: Queensland Firebirds
- Runners-up: New South Wales Swifts

ANZ Championship seasons
- ← 2015

The 2016 ANZ Championship season was the ninth and last season of the ANZ Championship. The season began on 1 April 2016 and concluded on 4 July 2016. Southern Steel were minor premiers. However they subsequently lost the New Zealand Conference Final to Waikato Bay of Plenty Magic and were defeated in the semi-finals by Queensland Firebirds. With a team coached by Roselee Jencke, captained by Laura Geitz and featuring Romelda Aiken, Clare McMeniman and Kim Ravaillion, Firebirds won the Australian Conference, the Challenge Trophy and the overall championship. Firebirds became the first and only team to retain the title. In a repeat of 2015, Firebirds defeated New South Wales Swifts in both the Australian Conference Final and the Grand Final.

== Transfers ==
Player	2015 team	2016 team
(England) Jade Clarke	Loughborough Lightning	Adelaide Thunderbirds
(Australia) Sarah Klau	Southern Force	Adelaide Thunderbirds
(Australia) Hannah Petty	Southern Force	Adelaide Thunderbirds
(England) Eboni Beckford-Chambers	Adelaide Thunderbirds	Team Bath
(New Zealand) Laura Langman	Northern Mystics	New South Wales Swifts
(Australia) Lauren Moore	NNSW Waratahs	New South Wales Swifts
(Australia) Maddy Turner	Southern Force	New South Wales Swifts
(Australia) Verity Simmons	Queensland Firebirds	West Coast Fever
(Australia) Chelsea Pitman	Manchester Thunder	Central Pulse
(New Zealand) Phoenix Karaka	Southern Steel	Central Pulse
(New Zealand) Maia Wilson	Mount Albert Grammar School	Central Pulse
(England) Ama Agbeze	Central Pulse	Loughborough Lightning
(New Zealand) Liana Leota	Central Pulse	Manchester Thunder
(New Zealand) Te Huinga Reo Selby-Rickit	Central Pulse	Southern Steel
(New Zealand) Michaela Sokolich-Beatson		Northern Mystics
(New Zealand) Keshia Grant	Mainland Tactix	Hertfordshire Mavericks

== Head coaches and captains ==
Team	Head coach	Captain
Adelaide Thunderbirds	Michelle Den Dekker ^{(Note 1)}	Erin Bell
Melbourne Vixens	Simone McKinnis	Madison Robinson
New South Wales Swifts	Robert Wright	Kimberlee Green
Queensland Firebirds	Roselee Jencke	Laura Geitz
West Coast Fever	Stacey Rosman	Ashleigh Brazill
Central Pulse	Tanya Dearns	Katrina Grant
Mainland Tactix	Sue Hawkins	Anna Thompson
Northern Mystics	Debbie Fuller	Maria Tutaia
Southern Steel	Noeline Taurua	Wendy Frew
Waikato Bay of Plenty Magic	Julie Fitzgerald	Leana de Bruin

Notes

^1 In June 2016, Michelle Den Dekker was replaced as Adelaide Thunderbirds head coach by Kristy Keppich-Birrell.

== Pre-season ==
On 5 March 2016, Melbourne Vixens played Adelaide Thunderbirds in a pre-season practice match at Wanganui Park Secondary College. The match was organised by Netball Victoria and the Greater Shepparton City Council. During the match, Vixens' Tegan Philip suffered an anterior cruciate ligament injury which ended her season.

Between 18 and 20 March 2016, two separate three-day events were held simultaneously. Northern Mystics hosted Waikato Bay of Plenty Magic, Southern Steel, Adelaide Thunderbirds and Queensland Firebirds at The Trusts Arena while New South Wales Swifts hosted Melbourne Vixens, West Coast Fever, Central Pulse and Mainland Tactix at Sydney Olympic Park Sports Centre. The two events experimented with a three-point scoring zone and rolling interchanges. Vixens defeated Fever in the final of the Sydney tournament.

== Regular season ==
=== Round 1 ===
Fri 1 April	Northern Mystics	57 - 58	Southern Steel	The Trusts Arena
7:10 PM (NZDT)	Maria Tutaia 22/30 (73%); Cathrine Tuivaiti 35/40 (88%)	Report	Jhaniele Fowler-Reid 48/56 (86%); Te Paea Selby-Rickit 9/14 (64%); Brooke Leaver 1/1 (100%)

Fri 1 April	Queensland Firebirds	70 - 55	Mainland Tactix	Brisbane Convention and Exhibition Centre
6:18 PM (AEST)	Romelda Aiken 45/49 (92%); Gretel Tippett 25/32 (78%)	Report	Mwai Kumwenda 37/39 (95%); Bailey Mes 18/28 (64%)

Sat 2 April	West Coast Fever	63 - 44	Adelaide Thunderbirds	HBF Stadium
2:18 PM (AWST)	Caitlin Bassett 47/49 (96%); Natalie Medhurst 11/13 (85%); Kaylia Stanton 5/6 (83%)	Report	Carla Borrego 17/21 (81%); Erin Bell 8/16 (50%); Cody Lange 19/25 (76%)

Sun 3 April	New South Wales Swifts	57 - 42	Melbourne Vixens	Sydney Olympic Park Sports Centre
12.18 PM (AEST)	Susan Pettitt 33/40 (83%); Caitlin Thwaites 21/27 (78%); Stephanie Wood 3/3 (100%); Amy Sommerville 0/1 (0%)	Report; Stats	Alice Teague-Neeld 17/22 (77%); Karyn Bailey 20/24 (83%); Emma Ryde 4/7 (57%); Kimberly Commane 1/2 (50%)

Mon 4 April	Central Pulse	57 - 56	Waikato Bay of Plenty Magic	TSB Bank Arena
7.40 PM (NZST)	Ameliaranne Wells 23/27 (85%); Maia Wilson 34/38 (89%)	Report	Joanne Harten 34/40 (85%); Malia Paseka 17/20 (85%); Ellen Halpenny 5/5 (100%)

=== Round 2 ===
Sat 9 April	New South Wales Swifts	78 - 50	Waikato Bay of Plenty Magic	Sydney Olympic Park Sports Centre
5:18 PM (AEST)	Susan Pettitt 25/29 (86%); Caitlin Thwaites 39/41 (95%); Stephanie Wood 8/8 (100%); Amy Sommerville 6/6 (100%)	Report	Joanne Harten 23/26 (88%); Malia Paseka 17/22 (77%); Paula Griffin 3/5 (60%)

Sun 10 April	Adelaide Thunderbirds	44 - 59	Melbourne Vixens	Titanium Security Arena
11:48 AM (ACST)	Carla Borrego 34/42 (81%); Erin Bell 10/13 (77%)	Report	Alice Teague-Neeld 21/23 (91%); Karyn Bailey 38/46 (83%)

Sun 10 April	Southern Steel	58 - 58	Mainland Tactix	Stadium Southland
4:10 PM (NZST)	Jhaniele Fowler-Reid 50/56 (89%); Te Paea Selby-Rickit 8/11 (73%); Brooke Leaver 0/1 (0%)	Report	Mwai Kumwenda 35/38 (92%); Bailey Mes 22/30 (73%); Gemma Hazeldine 1/2 (50%)

Mon 11 April	Northern Mystics	44 - 54	West Coast Fever	The Trusts Arena
7:40 PM (NZST)	Maria Tutaia 27/34 (79%); Cathrine Tuivaiti 4/6 (67%); Megan Craig 13/20 (65%)	Report	Caitlin Bassett 40/44 (91%); Natalie Medhurst 14/17 (82%)

Mon 11 April	Queensland Firebirds	61 - 45	Central Pulse	Brisbane Convention and Exhibition Centre
7:18 PM (AEST)	Romelda Aiken 38/41 (93%); Gretel Tippett 22/25 (88%); Beryl Friday 1/3 (33%)	Report	Ameliaranne Wells 22/24 (92%); Maia Wilson 21/30 (70%); Te Amo Amaru-Tibble 1/1 (100%)

=== Round 3 ===
Sat 16 April	Melbourne Vixens	47 - 58	Queensland Firebirds	Hisense Arena
5.18 PM (AEST)	Alice Teague-Neeld 15/22 (68%); Kimberley Commane 10/14 (71%); Emma Ryde 22/25 (88%)	Report	Romelda Aiken 42/45 (93%); Gretel Tippett 16/21 (76%)

Sun 17 April	New South Wales Swifts	68 - 44	Adelaide Thunderbirds	Sydney Olympic Park Sports Centre
12.18 PM (AEST)	Susan Pettitt 19/23 (83%); Caitlin Thwaites 34/39 (87%); Stephanie Wood 11/15 (73%); Amy Sommerville 4/5 (80%)	Report	Carla Borrego 28/32 (88%); Erin Bell 13/19 (68%); Kristina Brice 3/3 (100%)

Sun 17 April	West Coast Fever	64 - 50	Mainland Tactix	HBF Stadium
2:18 PM (AWST)	Caitlin Bassett 35/37 (95%); Natalie Medhurst 19/25 (76%); Kaylia Stanton 10/16 (63%)	Report	Mwai Kumwenda 29/32 (91%); Bailey Mes 18/22 (82%); Gemma Hazeldine 3/3 (100%)

Sun 17 April	Waikato Bay of Plenty Magic	53 - 63	Southern Steel	Energy Events Centre
4.10 PM (NZST)	Joanne Harten 20/27 (74%); Malia Paseka 31/45 (69%); Ellen Halpenny 2/2 (100%)	Report	Jhaniele Fowler-Reid 44/47 (94%); Te Paea Selby-Rickit 19/24 (79%)

Mon 18 April	Central Pulse	52 - 52	Northern Mystics	TSB Bank Arena
7:40 PM (NZST)	Ameliaranne Wells 20/27 (74%); Maia Wilson 32/34 (94%)	Report	Maria Tutaia 23/32 (72%); Cathrine Tuivaiti 29/30 (97%)

=== Round 4 ANZAC Round ===
Sat 23 April	Adelaide Thunderbirds	46 - 58	Queensland Firebirds	Priceline Stadium
4.48 AM (ACST)	Kristina Brice 28/34 (82%); Erin Bell 18/27 (67%)	Report	Romelda Aiken 37/46 (80%); Gretel Tippett 21/32 (66%); Beryl Friday 0/1 (0%)

Sun 24 April	West Coast Fever	52 - 63	New South Wales Swifts	HBF Stadium
10.18 AM (AWST)	Caitlin Bassett 38/42 (90%); Natalie Medhurst 14/17 (82%)	Report	Susan Pettitt 24/26 (92%); Caitlin Thwaites 39/45 (87%)

Sun 24 April	Southern Steel	67 - 54	Central Pulse	Stadium Southland
4.10 PM (NZST)	Jhaniele Fowler-Reid 41/47 (87%); Te Paea Selby-Rickit 25/28 (89%); Brooke Leaver 1/3 (33%)	Report	Ameliaranne Wells 21/25 (84%); Maia Wilson 33/35 (94%)

Mon 25 April	Mainland Tactix	56 - 55	Northern Mystics	Horncastle Arena
7.40 PM (NZST)	Mwai Kumwenda 29/34 (85%); Bailey Mes 27/32 (84%)	Report	Maria Tutaia 25/30 (83%); Cathrine Tuivaiti 29/31 (94%); Megan Craig 1/1 (100%)

BYES: Melbourne Vixens and Waikato Bay of Plenty Magic

=== Round 5 ===
Sat 30 April	Southern Steel	69 - 62	West Coast Fever	Stadium Southland
4:10 PM (NZST)	Jhaniele Fowler-Reid 59/65 (91%); Te Paea Selby-Rickit 10/13 (77%)	Report	Caitlin Bassett 44/48 (92%); Natalie Medhurst 18/19 (95%)

Sat 30 April	Queensland Firebirds	61 - 51	New South Wales Swifts	Brisbane Entertainment Centre
5:18 PM (AEST)	Romelda Aiken 52/63 (83%); Gretel Tippett 9/16 (56%)	Report	Susan Pettitt 19/23 (83%); Caitlin Thwaites 32/36 (89%)

Sun 1 May	Melbourne Vixens	57 - 34	Waikato Bay of Plenty Magic	Hisense Arena
12:18 PM (AEST)	Alice Teague-Neeld 19/27 (70%); Kimberley Commane 25/29 (86%); Emma Ryde 13/20 (65%)	Report	Joanne Harten 10/15 (67%); Malia Paseka 8/14 (57%); Ellen Halpenny 11/14 (79%); Paula Griffin 5/5 (100%)

Sun 1 May	Central Pulse	57 - 58	Mainland Tactix	Te Rauparaha Arena
4:10 PM (NZST)	Ameliaranne Wells 16/24 (67%); Maia Wilson 41/42 (98%); Chelsea Locke 0/1 (0%)	Report	Mwai Kumwenda 26/32 (81%); Bailey Mes 31/36 (86%); Gemma Hazeldine 1/1 (100%)

Mon 2 May	Northern Mystics	52 - 49	Adelaide Thunderbirds	The Trusts Arena
7:40 PM (NZST)	Maria Tutaia 24/30 (80%); Cathrine Tuivaiti 28/29 (97%)	Report	Carla Borrego 36/42 (86%); Erin Bell 13/18 (72%)

=== Round 6 ===
Sat 7 May	Queensland Firebirds	70 - 42	Northern Mystics	Brisbane Convention and Exhibition Centre
5:18 PM (AEST)	Romelda Aiken 52/57 (91%); Gretel Tippett 8/10 (80%); Chelsea Lemke 10/13 (77%)	Report	Maria Tutaia 23/33 (70%); Cathrine Tuivaiti 9/9 (100%); Megan Craig 10/15 (67%)

Sun 8 May	New South Wales Swifts	79 - 41	Central Pulse	Sydney Olympic Park Sports Centre
12:18 PM (AEST)	Susan Pettitt 16/18 (89%); Caitlin Thwaites 50/53 (94%); Stephanie Wood 13/15 (87%)	Report	Ameliaranne Wells 16/21 (76%); Maia Wilson 17/19 (89%); Te Amo Amaru-Tibble 8/11 (73%)

Sun 8 May	Adelaide Thunderbirds	54 - 69	Southern Steel	Priceline Stadium
1:48 PM (ACST)	Carla Borrego 40/50 (80%); Erin Bell 7/10 (70%); Stephanie Puopolo 7/9 (78%)	Report	Jhaniele Fowler-Reid 60/70 (86%); Te Paea Selby-Rickit 6/6 (100%); Brooke Leaver 3/9 (33%)

Mon 9 May	Mainland Tactix	48 - 69	Melbourne Vixens	Horncastle Arena
6:10 PM (NZST)	Mwai Kumwenda 31/40 (78%); Bailey Mes 17/29 (59%)	Report	Alice Teague-Neeld 17/23 (74%); Kimberley Commane 2/3 (67%); Karyn Bailey 50/59 (85%)

Mon 9 May	Waikato Bay of Plenty Magic	44 - 58	West Coast Fever	ASB Arena
8:10 PM (NZST)	Joanne Harten 25/33 (76%); Malia Paseka 12/18 (67%); Ellen Halpenny 1/7 (14%); Paula Griffin 6/8 (75%)	Report	Caitlin Bassett 36/40 (90%); Natalie Medhurst 15/17 (88%); Kaylia Stanton 7/10 (70%)

=== Round 7 ===
Sat 14 May	West Coast Fever	52 - 61	Queensland Firebirds	HBF Stadium
3:18 PM (AWST)	Caitlin Bassett 38/46 (83%); Natalie Medhurst 14/21 (67%)	Report	Romelda Aiken 50/57 (88%); Chelsea Lemke 11/16 (69%)

Sun 15 May	Melbourne Vixens	51 - 59	New South Wales Swifts	Hisense Arena
12:18 PM (AEST)	Alice Teague-Neeld 17/22 (77%); Kimberley Commane 7/9 (78%); Karyn Bailey 27/34 (79%)	Report	Susan Pettitt 24/27 (89%); Caitlin Thwaites 35/39 (90%)

Sun 15 May	Mainland Tactix	57 - 58	Waikato Bay of Plenty Magic	Trafalgar Centre
4:10 PM (NZST)	Mwai Kumwenda 31/35 (89%); Bailey Mes 21/27 (78%); Gemma Hazeldine 5/6 (83%)	Report	Joanne Harten 35/43 (81%); Malia Paseka 15/21 (71%); Paula Griffin 8/11 (73%)

Mon 16 May	Northern Mystics	55 - 53	Central Pulse	The Trusts Arena
7:40 PM (NZST)	Maria Tutaia 21/29 (72%); Cathrine Tuivaiti 34/36 (94%)	Report	Ameliaranne Wells 19/24 (79%); Maia Wilson 34/37 (92%)

BYES: Adelaide Thunderbirds and Southern Steel

=== Round 8 ===
Sat 21 May	Waikato Bay of Plenty Magic	49 - 45	Northern Mystics	Claudelands Arena
4:10 PM (NZST)	Joanne Harten 30/34 (88%); Malia Paseka 14/17 (82%); Paula Griffin 5/7 (71%)	Report	Maria Tutaia 29/33 (88%); Cathrine Tuivaiti 16/16 (100%)

Sat 21 May	West Coast Fever	53 - 54	Melbourne Vixens	Perth Arena
3:18 PM (AWST)	Caitlin Bassett 37/42 (88%); Natalie Medhurst 16/18 (89%)	Report	Alice Teague-Neeld 19/26 (73%); Karyn Bailey 35/39 (90%)

Sun 22 May	Queensland Firebirds	62 - 51	Adelaide Thunderbirds	Brisbane Convention and Exhibition Centre
12:18 PM (AEST)	Romelda Aiken 45/50 (90%); Gretel Tippett 17/26 (65%)	Report	Carla Borrego 33/36 (92%); Erin Bell 18/22 (82%)

Sun 22 May	Mainland Tactix	52 - 73	New South Wales Swifts	Horncastle Arena
4:10 PM (NZST)	Mwai Kumwenda 19/22 (86%); Bailey Mes 32/38 (84%); Gemma Hazeldine 1/1 (100%)	Report	Susan Pettitt 10/12 (83%); Caitlin Thwaites 32/35 (91%); Stephanie Wood 31/39 (79%)

Mon 23 May	Central Pulse	63 - 67	Southern Steel	TSB Bank Arena
7:40 PM (NZST)	Ameliaranne Wells 26/28 (93%); Maia Wilson 37/40 (93%)	Report	Jhaniele Fowler-Reid 54/56 (96%); Te Paea Selby-Rickit 13/21 (62%)

=== Round 9 ===
Sat 28 May	Melbourne Vixens	57 - 51	Adelaide Thunderbirds	Margaret Court Arena
5:18 PM (AEST)	Alice Teague-Neeld 23/31 (74%); Karyn Bailey 34/36 (94%)	Report	Carla Borrego 6/8 (75%); Erin Bell 13/16 (81%); Kristina Brice 27/30 (90%); Stephanie Puopolo 5/5 (100%)

Sun 29 May	New South Wales Swifts	58 - 67	Queensland Firebirds	Qudos Bank Arena
12:18 PM (AEST)	Susan Pettitt 33/39 (85%); Caitlin Thwaites 10/14 (71%); Stephanie Wood 15/19 (79%)	Report	Romelda Aiken 46/51 (90%); Gretel Tippett 8/12 (67%)	Attendance: 13,314

Sun 29 May	Southern Steel	66 - 60	Northern Mystics	Edgar Centre
4:10 PM (NZST)	Jhaniele Fowler-Reid 56/69 (81%); Te Paea Selby-Rickit 10/16 (63%)	Report	Maria Tutaia 13/21 (62%); Cathrine Tuivaiti 47/49 (96%)

Mon 30 May	Waikato Bay of Plenty Magic	54 - 44	Central Pulse	ASB Arena
7:40 PM (NZST)	Joanne Harten 31/38 (82%); Malia Paseka 15/19 (79%); Paula Griffin 8/11 (73%)	Report	Ameliaranne Wells 23/30 (77%); Maia Wilson 21/24 (88%); Chelsea Locke 0/3 (0%)

BYES: West Coast Fever and Mainland Tactix

=== Round 10 ===
Sat 4 June	Queensland Firebirds	56 - 44	Melbourne Vixens	Gold Coast Convention and Exhibition Centre
5:18 PM (AEST)	Romelda Aiken 39/43 (91%); Gretel Tippett 17/23 (74%)	Report	Alice Teague-Neeld 11/17 (65%); Karyn Bailey 19/25 (76%); Kimberly Commane 14/19 (74%)

Sun 5 June	Adelaide Thunderbirds	51 - 63	West Coast Fever	Priceline Stadium
11:48 AM (ACST)	Erin Bell 28/35 (80%); Kristina Brice 16/19 (84%); Stephanie Puopolo 7/11 (64%)	Report	Caitlin Bassett 50/54 (93%); Natalie Medhurst 13/18 (72%)

Sun 5 June	Mainland Tactix	51 - 81	Southern Steel	Horncastle Arena
4:10 PM (NZST)	Mwai Kumwenda 24/26 (92%); Bailey Mes 24/29 (83%); Gemma Hazeldine 3/4 (75%)	Report	Jhaniele Fowler-Reid 64/66 (97%); Te Paea Selby-Rickit 13/18 (72%); Brooke Leaver 4/6 (67%)

Mon 6 June	Northern Mystics	51 - 54	Waikato Bay of Plenty Magic	The Trusts Arena
7:40 PM (NZST)	Maria Tutaia 29/34 (85%); Cathrine Tuivaiti 22/23 (96%)	Report	Joanne Harten 23/30 (77%); Malia Paseka 18/21 (86%); Paula Griffin 13/15 (87%)

BYES: New South Wales Swifts and Central Pulse

=== Round 11 ===
Sat 11 June	Southern Steel	66 - 51	Queensland Firebirds	Edgar Centre
4:10 PM (NZST)	Jhaniele Fowler-Reid 51/57 (89%); Te Paea Selby-Rickit 15/17 (88%); Brooke Leaver 0/1 (0%)	Report	Romelda Aiken 27/32 (84%); Gretel Tippett 16/19 (84%); Beryl Friday 8/9 (89%)

Sat 11 June	New South Wales Swifts	57 - 58	West Coast Fever	Newcastle Entertainment Centre
5:48 PM (AEST)	Susan Pettitt 20/23 (87%); Caitlin Thwaites 37/40 (93%)	Report	Caitlin Bassett 45/50 (90%); Natalie Medhurst 13/14 (93%)

Sun 12 June	Melbourne Vixens	69 - 46	Northern Mystics	Hisense Arena
12:18 PM (AEST)	Alice Teague-Neeld 15/24 (63%); Karyn Bailey 52/58 (90%); Kimberley Commane 2/3 (67%)	Report	Maria Tutaia 19/24 (79%); Cathrine Tuivaiti 7/8 (88%); Megan Craig 20/23 (87%)

Sun 12 June	Central Pulse	46 - 60	Adelaide Thunderbirds	Te Rauparaha Arena
4:10 PM (NZST)	Ameliaranne Wells 16/25 (64%); Maia Wilson 23/25 (92%); Te Amo Amaru-Tibble 7/10 (70%)	Report	Kristina Brice 44/49 (90%); Erin Bell 16/19 (84%)

Mon 13 June	Waikato Bay of Plenty Magic	56 - 55	Mainland Tactix	Claudelands Arena
7:40 PM (NZST)	Joanne Harten 40/43 (93%); Ellen Halpenny 10/11 (91%); Paula Griffin 6/6 (100%)	Report	Mwai Kumwenda 31/37 (84%); Bailey Mes 24/33 (73%)

=== Round 12 ===
Sat 18 June	Adelaide Thunderbirds	53 - 67	New South Wales Swifts	Titanium Security Arena
4:48 PM (ACST)	Kristina Brice 42/51 (82%); Erin Bell 11	Report	Susan Pettitt 36/37 (97%); Caitlin Thwaites 31

Sun 19 June	Melbourne Vixens	60 - 55	West Coast Fever	Hisense Arena
12:18 PM (AEST)	Alice Teague-Neeld 18/22 (82%); Karyn Bailey 42/46 (91%)	Report	Caitlin Bassett 53/47 (113%); Natalie Medhurst 8/12 (67%) ?	Attendance: 8,613

Sun 19 June	Southern Steel	64 - 54	Waikato Bay of Plenty Magic	Stadium Southland
4:10 PM (NZST)	Jhaniele Fowler-Reid 55/61 (90%); Te Paea Selby-Rickit 9/15 (60%)	Report; Stats	Joanne Harten 37/45 (82%); Ellen Halpenny 1/6 (17%); Paula Griffin 16/21 (76%)

Mon 20 June	Mainland Tactix	59 - 64	Central Pulse	Horncastle Arena
7:40 PM (NZST)	Mwai Kumwenda 43/45 (96%); Bailey Mes 12/16 (75%); Gemma Hazeldine 4/5 (80%)	Report	Maia Wilson 50/55 (91%); Te Amo Amaru-Tibble 14/17 (82%)

BYES: Queensland Firebirds and Northern Mystics

=== Round 13 ===
Sat 25 June	Southern Steel	65 - 56	Melbourne Vixens	Stadium Southland
4:10 PM (NZST)	Jhaniele Fowler-Reid 49/54 (91%); Te Paea Selby-Rickit 16/19 (84%)	Report	Alice Teague-Neeld 23/27 (85%); Karyn Bailey 13/15 (87%); Kimberley Commane 4/5 (80%); Emma Ryde 16/23 (70%)

Sat 25 June	West Coast Fever	70 - 47	Central Pulse	Perth Arena
3:18 AM (AWST)	Caitlin Bassett 52/54 (96%); Natalie Medhurst 18/21 (86%)	Report	Ameliaranne Wells 16/23 (70%); Maia Wilson 31/33 (94%)

Sun 26 June	Adelaide Thunderbirds	58 - 55	Mainland Tactix	Priceline Stadium
11:48 PM (ACST)	Kristina Brice 29/34 (85%); Erin Bell 29/34 (85%)	Report	Mwai Kumwenda 33/36 (92%); Bailey Mes 22/31 (71%)

Sun 26 June	Northern Mystics	53 - 59	New South Wales Swifts	The Trusts Arena
4:10 PM (NZST)	Maria Tutaia 22/26 (85%); Cathrine Tuivaiti 31/33 (94%)	Report	Susan Pettitt 24/29 (83%); Caitlin Thwaites 13/13 (100%); Stephanie Wood 22/27 (81%)

Mon 27 June	Waikato Bay of Plenty Magic	47 - 71	Queensland Firebirds	Claudelands Arena
7:40 PM (NZST)	Joanne Harten 32/38 (84%); Paula Griffin 15/21 (71%)	Report	Romelda Aiken 50/59 (85%); Gretel Tippett 21/27 (78%)

=== Round 14 ===
Sat 2 July	Northern Mystics	62 - 54	Mainland Tactix	The Trusts Arena
4:10 PM (NZST)	Maria Tutaia 32/36 (89%); Cathrine Tuivaiti 30/32 (94%)	Report	Mwai Kumwenda 35/37 (95%); Bailey Mes 18/20 (90%); Gemma Hazeldine 1/2 (50%)

Sat 2 July	New South Wales Swifts	59 - 59	Southern Steel	Sydney Olympic Park Sports Centre
5:18 PM (AEST)	Susan Pettitt 30/32 (94%); Caitlin Thwaites 29/31 (94%)	Report	Jhaniele Fowler-Reid 50/52 (96%); Te Paea Selby-Rickit 9/12 (75%)

Sun 3 July	Queensland Firebirds	63 - 52	West Coast Fever	Brisbane Convention and Exhibition Centre
12:18 PM (AEST)	Romelda Aiken 49/54 (91%); Gretel Tippett 14/18 (78%)	Report	Caitlin Bassett 39/41 (95%); Natalie Medhurst 8/10 (80%); Kate Beveridge 5/7 (71%)

Sun 3 July	Waikato Bay of Plenty Magic	56 - 55	Adelaide Thunderbirds	Claudelands Arena
4:10 PM (NZST)	Joanne Harten 40/44 (91%); Paula Griffin 3/3 (100%); Ellen Halpenny 13/17 (76%)	Report	Kristina Brice 37/42 (88%); Erin Bell 18/22 (82%)

Mon 4 July	Central Pulse	53 - 66	Melbourne Vixens	TSB Bank Arena
7:40 PM (NZST)	Ameliaranne Wells 11/13 (85%); Maia Wilson 36/40 (90%); Te Amo Amaru-Tibble 6/7 (86%)	Report	Alice Teague-Neeld 13/14 (93%); Kimberley Commane 1/1 (100%); Emma Ryde 52/56 (93%)

=== Final standings ===
2016 Australian Conference
Pos	Team	Pld	W	D	L	GF	GA	GD	G%	Pts
1	Queensland Firebirds	13	11	2	0	796	656	140	121.3%	22
2	New South Wales Swifts	13	10	2	1	828	670	158	123.6%	21
3	Melbourne Vixens	13	8	5	0	731	679	52	107.7%	16
4	West Coast Fever	13	7	6	0	756	707	49	106.9%	14
5	Adelaide Thunderbirds	13	2	11	0	660	775	-115	85.2%	4
2016 New Zealand Conference
Pos	Team	Pld	W	D	L	GF	GA	GD	G%	Pts
1	Southern Steel	13	11	0	2	852	732	120	116.4%	24
2	Waikato Bay of Plenty Magic	13	6	7	0	665	755	-90	88.1%	12
3	Northern Mystics	13	3	9	1	674	743	-69	90.7%	7
5	Mainland Tactix	13	2	10	1	708	825	-117	85.8%	5
4	Central Pulse	13	2	10	1	676	804	-128	84.1%	5

Qualified for Conference finals
Qualified for Elimination finals

- Pld = Games played
- W = Win (2 points)
- D = Draw (1 points)
- L = Loss (0 points)
- GF = Goals For
- GA = Goals Against
- GD = Goals Difference (= GF−GA)
- G% = Goal percentage (= 100 × GF/GA)
- Pts = Points

=== Challenge Trophy ===
Queensland Firebirds began their defence of the Challenge Trophy in Round 1 against Mainland Tactix. Firebirds were unbeaten at home throughout the season and, as a result, retained the Challenge Trophy.

Round	Holders	Score	Challengers
Round 1	Queensland Firebirds	70–55	Mainland Tactix
Round 2	Queensland Firebirds	61–45	Central Pulse
Round 5	Queensland Firebirds	61–51	New South Wales Swifts
Round 6	Queensland Firebirds	70–42	Northern Mystics
Round 8	Queensland Firebirds	62–51	Adelaide Thunderbirds
Round 10	Queensland Firebirds	56–44	Melbourne Vixens
Round 14	Queensland Firebirds	63–52	West Coast Fever

== Finals series ==
=== Australian Conference ===
Elimination Final

10 July 2016; 5.18 pm (AEST)	Stats	New South Wales Swifts	67–53	Melbourne Vixens	Sydney Olympic Park Sports Centre
10 July 2016; 5.18 pm (AEST)	Stats	Scoring by quarter: 17-13, 20-12, 16-10, 14-18			Sydney Olympic Park Sports Centre
10 July 2016; 5.18 pm (AEST)	Stats	Caitlin Thwaites 40/44 (91%); Susan Pettitt 23/24 (96%); Stephanie Wood 4/7 (57%)		Emma Ryde 37/42 (88%); Alice Teague-Neeld 10/12 (83%); Kimberley Commane 6/6 (100%)	Sydney Olympic Park Sports Centre

Conference Final

18 July 2016; 7.18 (AEST)	Stats	Queensland Firebirds	63–52	New South Wales Swifts	Brisbane Entertainment Centre
18 July 2016; 7.18 (AEST)	Stats	Scoring by quarter: 16-12, 16-15, 15-10, 16-15			Brisbane Entertainment Centre
18 July 2016; 7.18 (AEST)	Stats	Romelda Aiken 49/55 (89%); Gretel Tippett 14		Caitlin Thwaites 17; Susan Pettitt 30; Stephanie Wood 5	Brisbane Entertainment Centre

=== New Zealand Conference ===
Elimination Final

10 July 2016; 4.10 pm (NZST)	Stats	Waikato Bay of Plenty Magic	63–47	Northern Mystics	Claudelands Arena
10 July 2016; 4.10 pm (NZST)	Stats	Scoring by quarter: 17-10, 14-14, 13-13, 19-10			Claudelands Arena
10 July 2016; 4.10 pm (NZST)	Stats	Joanne Harten 44/48 (92%); Ellen Halpenny 19/21 (90%)		Maria Tutaia 19/27 (70%); Cathrine Tuivaiti 22/22 (100%); Megan Craig 6/7 (86%)	Claudelands Arena

Conference Final

17 July 2016; 4.15 pm (NZST)	Stats	Southern Steel	57–59	Waikato Bay of Plenty Magic	Stadium Southland
17 July 2016; 4.15 pm (NZST)	Stats	Scoring by quarter: 13 -19, 14 -16, 15-12, 15-12			Stadium Southland
17 July 2016; 4.15 pm (NZST)	Stats	Jhaniele Fowler-Reid 47/53 (89%); Te Paea Selby-Rickit 10/11 (91%)		Joanne Harten 46/52 (88%); Ellen Halpenny 13/17 (76%)	Stadium Southland

=== Semi-finals ===
24 July 2016; 12.18 pm (AEST)	Stats	Queensland Firebirds	67–64	Southern Steel	Brisbane Entertainment Centre
24 July 2016; 12.18 pm (AEST)	Stats	Scoring by quarter: 19 - 16, 13 - 19, 15 - 14, 20 -15			Brisbane Entertainment Centre
24 July 2016; 12.18 pm (AEST)	Stats	Romelda Aiken 57/68 (84%); Gretel Tippett 10/13 (77%)		Jhaniele Fowler-Reid 51/52 (98%); Te Paea Selby-Rickit 13/20 (65%)	Brisbane Entertainment Centre

25 July 2016; 7.45 pm (NZST)	Stats	Waikato Bay of Plenty Magic	45–64	New South Wales Swifts	Claudelands Arena
25 July 2016; 7.45 pm (NZST)	Stats	Scoring by quarter: 14 - 16, 10 - 17, 7 - 16, 14 - 15			Claudelands Arena
25 July 2016; 7.45 pm (NZST)	Stats	Joanne Harten 38/42 (90%); Ellen Halpenny 5/9 (56%); Grace Rasmussen 2/2 (100%)		Susan Pettitt 15/19 (79%); Caitlin Thwaites 43/46 (93%); Stephanie Wood 6/8 (75%)	Claudelands Arena

=== Grand Final ===
31 July 2016; 12.10 pm (AEST)	Stats	Queensland Firebirds	69–67	New South Wales Swifts	ET	Brisbane Entertainment Centre; Attendance: 10,312	Fox Sports; Sky Sport
31 July 2016; 12.10 pm (AEST)	Stats	Scoring by quarter: 12-15, 17-12, 12-15, 13-12, ET: 15-13			ET	Brisbane Entertainment Centre; Attendance: 10,312	Fox Sports; Sky Sport
31 July 2016; 12.10 pm (AEST)	Stats	Scoring by half: 29-27, 25-27 ET: 15-13			ET	Brisbane Entertainment Centre; Attendance: 10,312	Fox Sports; Sky Sport
31 July 2016; 12.10 pm (AEST)	Stats	Romelda Aiken 63/89 (71%); Gretel Tippett 6/11 (55%)		Susan Pettitt 30/39 (77%); Caitlin Thwaites 34/41 (83%); Stephanie Wood 3/4 (75%)	ET	Brisbane Entertainment Centre; Attendance: 10,312	Fox Sports; Sky Sport

== Award winners ==
=== ANZ Championship awards ===
Award	Winner	Team
ANZ Championship MVP	(Australia) Madison Robinson ^{(Note 2)}	Melbourne Vixens
ANZ Championship MVP	(Jamaica) Jhaniele Fowler-Reid ^{(Note 2)}	Southern Steel
ANZ Championship Finals Series MVP	(Australia) Kim Ravaillion	Queensland Firebirds
ANZ Championship Best New Talent	(Australia) Kristina Brice	Adelaide Thunderbirds

Notes

^2 Madison Robinson was the MVP player in the Australian Conference and Jhaniele Fowler-Reid was the MVP player in the New Zealand Conference.

=== All Star Team ===
Position	Player	Team
GS	(Jamaica) Romelda Aiken	Queensland Firebirds
GA	(Australia) Susan Pettitt	New South Wales Swifts
WA	(Australia) Kimberlee Green	New South Wales Swifts
C	(Australia) Kim Ravaillion	Queensland Firebirds
WD	(New Zealand) Laura Langman	New South Wales Swifts
GD	(Australia) Clare McMeniman	Queensland Firebirds
GK	(Australia) Sharni Layton	New South Wales Swifts
Coach	(Australia) Robert Wright	New South Wales Swifts

=== Australian Netball Awards ===
Award	Winner	Team
Australian ANZ Championship Player of the Year	Sharni Layton	New South Wales Swifts
Australian ANZ Championship Coach of the Year	Roselee Jencke	Queensland Firebirds

=== New Zealand Netball Awards ===
Award	Winner	Team
New Zealand ANZ Championship Player of the Year	Gina Crampton	Southern Steel
New Zealand ANZ Championship Coach of the Year	Julie Fitzgerald	Waikato Bay of Plenty Magic

== Media coverage ==
All 72 games were broadcast live on Fox Sports (Australia) and Sky Sport (New Zealand). Sunday 12.00pm (AEST) fixtures were simulcast live on Fox Sports, Network Ten in Sydney, Melbourne, Brisbane and Adelaide, and by One in Perth. The season had a cumulative broadcast audience of 4.9m.
