= Taylah Davies =

Australian netballer

Personal information
- Full name: Taylah Davies
- Born: 3 October 1994 (age 31) Wollongong, Australia
- Height: 170 cm (5 ft 7 in)

Netball career
- Playing positions: WA, C
Years	Club team	Apps
2014–present	NSW Swifts	1
Years	National team	Caps
- Australian Under 21 Squad
- Australian Netball Diamonds

Taylah Davies (born 3 October 1994 in Wollongong, Australia) is an Australian netballer and Australian rules footballer. Primarily a wing attack and centre player, Davies was a member of the NSW Swifts in the ANZ Championship and the Giants in the Suncorp Super League. Davies represented Greater Western Sydney in the AFL Women's (AFLW).

== Career ==
Taylah Davies has represented NSW in netball many times. She was a member of the 2013 NSW Waratahs ANL Team who were runners up, the 2010-2011 NSW 17/U Squad, 2012 NSW 19/U Team and 2013-14 21/U Team. She was also awarded the Marj Groves AM Scholarship in 2013 and 2014. This is awarded to an outstanding athlete within the NSW Institute of Sport Netball Program.

Davies was also a member of the Australian 17/U Squad in 2010-11 and the Australian 21/U Squad in 2014, although she was withdraw due to the injury to her ACL sustained in the ANZ Championship.

Taylah Davies was first called into the ANZ Championship for the NSW Swifts as a replacement player for the 2014 ANZ Championship preseason tournament in Melbourne in February. After this, she was again called in as a replacement player for rounds two and three of the ANZ Championship. Four minutes into her debut against the Adelaide Thunderbirds in Adelaide, Davies suffered an ACL injury (Anterior Cruciate Ligament) requiring surgery, effectively ending her season.

Davies has been signed by the NSW Swifts as a permanent member of the team for the 2015 ANZ Championship season.

== Netball career facts ==
- 2017 Giants Netball team
- 2015 NSW Swifts Team
- 2014 Marj Groves AM Scholarship Recipient
- 2014 NSW Swifts Replacement Player
- 2014 Australian 21/U Squad (*withdrawn with injury)
- 2013-14 NSW 21/U Team
- 2013 Marj Groves AM Scholarship Recipient
- 2013 NSW Waratahs (Runners-Up)
- 2012 NSW 19/U Team
- 2010-2011 Australian 17/U Squad
- 2010-2011 NSW 17/U Team
