= Castle Hill High School =

Location
- Castle Hill, New South Wales; Australia; 33°43′35.80″S 150°59′58.01″E

Information
- Type: Public school, co-educational, comprehensive school
- Motto: Truth is Strength
- Established: 1963
- Principal: Georgina Cuthbertson
- Staff: 136
- Enrollment: 1900
- Colours: Blue and white
- Website: https://castlehill-h.schools.nsw.gov.au/

Castle Hill High School is a co-educational comprehensive school in Castle Hill, a suburb in Sydney, Australia. The school caters for students ranging from year 7 to year 12 and was established in 1963. Castle Hill High School generally performs well in the HSC, with many students achieving band 6s each year. In 2024, 275 were achieved, alongside five state ranks, one of which being a statewide first in course. Nine students also received an all rounder award for achieving band 6s/E4s in 10 units or more. The school was recognised by Better Education for its HSC results, coming 108th in New South Wales in 2024.

== Co- and extra curricular activities ==
Historically Castle Hill High School has demonstrated strong participation in extracurricular activities, including sport, musical production, leadership, technology and public competitions.

=== Sporting ===
Castle Hill High School holds various sporting events including Cross-Country, Swimming and Athletics Carnivals, where students can compete for participation in wider regional competitions, consisting of Zone (representing the school), Regionals (representing Hills Zone) and Combined High Schools (representing Sydney West).

The school formerly competed against Crestwood High School in the Brewer Cup.

=== Academics ===
Castle Hill High School participates in the following inter-school academic competitions:

- Robocup
- The Premier's Debating Challenge
- Australian Mathematics Competition
- Da Vinci Decathlon

=== Student leadership ===
- The Student Representative Council (SRC) – A group of junior students elected by their peers to represent the school and help with the organisation of events.
- Peer Support Leader – Year 10 leaders who assist new students settle into the school.
- The Prefect Body – Year 11 and 12 students who represent the school and organise events.
- The Sport's Council – a group of Year 11 and 12 students tasked with facilitating sporting events such as the annual carnivals.
- The CAPA Council – a newly created body of Year 12 students oriented towards promoting the values of the performing arts within the school.

=== Clubs ===
- The Knights Quill newspaper club is perhaps the most notable club, being active for the latter part of 2024 and most of 2025. Despite its relatively long life of around a year, due to internal issues the club only managed to complete and release two full newspaper issues, which can be found in the school library or on the student canvas page.

== Notable alumni ==
- Briony Akle, netball coach and former player
- Dieter Brummer, Home and Away actor
- Alexandra Davies, All Saints actor
- Maree Holland, Olympian 400m athletics finalist
- Michelle Rzepecki, goalball player
