= Maddy Proud =

Australian netball player and author

Personal information
- Full name: Madeleine Proud
- Born: 4 December 1993 (age 32) Adelaide; South Australia
- Height: 1.74 m (5 ft 9 in)
- School: Sacred Heart College
- University: University of South Australia; Macquarie University

Netball career
- Playing positions: C, WA, WD
| Years | Club team | Apps |
| 20xx–2011 | Contax | |
| 2010–2012 | → SASI | |
| 2011–2016 | New South Wales Swifts | |
| 2012 | → Southern Force | |
| 2013 | → AIS | |
| 2017– | New South Wales Swifts | |
| 2017 | → NSWIS | |
| Years | National team | Caps |
| 2018– | Australia | |
Medal record
Representing Australia
Fast5 World Series
| Bronze medal – third place | 2018 Melbourne | Team |
Netball World Youth Cup
| Silver medal – second place | 2013 Glasgow | Team |

Maddy Proud (born 4 December 1993), also known as Madeleine Proud, is an Australian netball player. Between 2011 and 2016, Proud played for Adelaide Thunderbirds in the ANZ Championship. Since 2017, she has played for New South Wales Swifts in Suncorp Super Netball. She captained the Swifts team that won the 2019 Suncorp Super Netball title. She has also represented Australia at under-21 and Fast5 level and debuted for the Diamonds in 2022.

== Early life and education ==
Proud was born and raised in Adelaide. Between 2009 and 2011, she attended Sacred Heart College. Between 2012 and 2016 she attended the University of South Australia where she gained a Bachelor of Management in Marketing. Between 2018 and 2020, she attended Macquarie University where she completed a Masters of Creative Writing.

== Playing career ==
=== Early years ===
In her youth, Proud played for Contax and the South Australian Sports Institute. She also represented South Australia at under-17 level.

=== Adelaide Thunderbirds ===
Between 2011 and 2016, Proud played for Adelaide Thunderbirds in the ANZ Championship. She was 16 when she joined Thunderbirds. During the 2012 season, Proud also played for Southern Force in the Australian Netball League. She was a member of the Force team that finished as ANL Champions. During the 2013 season, she played with the Australian Institute of Sport.

=== New South Wales Swifts ===
Since 2017, Proud has played for New South Wales Swifts in Suncorp Super Netball. In 2017 Proud was named both QBE NSW Swifts MVP and the NSW Swifts Members' Player of the Year. Proud captained the New South Wales Institute of Sport team that finished third in the 2017 Netball New Zealand Super Club tournament. In February 2019 Proud was appointed captain of Swifts. She captained the Swifts team that won the 2019 Suncorp Super Netball title, but missed the second half of the season because of injury. She was re-appointed Swifts' captain for both the 2020 and 2021 seasons.

=== Australia ===
Proud has represented Australia at under-21 and Fast5 level. In 2012 she was named the Australian Under-21 Team Player of the Year. She captained Australia at the 2013 Netball World Youth Cup She was included in the senior Australia squad for 2020–21.

| Tournaments | Place |
|---|---|
| 2013 Netball World Youth Cup | 2nd place, silver medalist(s) |
| 2018 Fast5 Netball World Series | 3rd place, bronze medalist(s) |

== Children's writer ==
In January 2018, Proud became a published children's author after she released Grace on the Court, a book chronicling the life of a 13-year-old netball player in her first year at high school.

== Honours ==
New South Wales Swifts

- Suncorp Super Netball
  - Winners: 2019

Southern Force

- Australian Netball League
  - Winners: 2012

Individual

- QBE NSW Swifts MVP
  - Winner: 2017
- NSW Swifts Members' Player of the Year
  - Winner: 2017
