= Sharni Norder =

Australian sportsperson (born 1988)

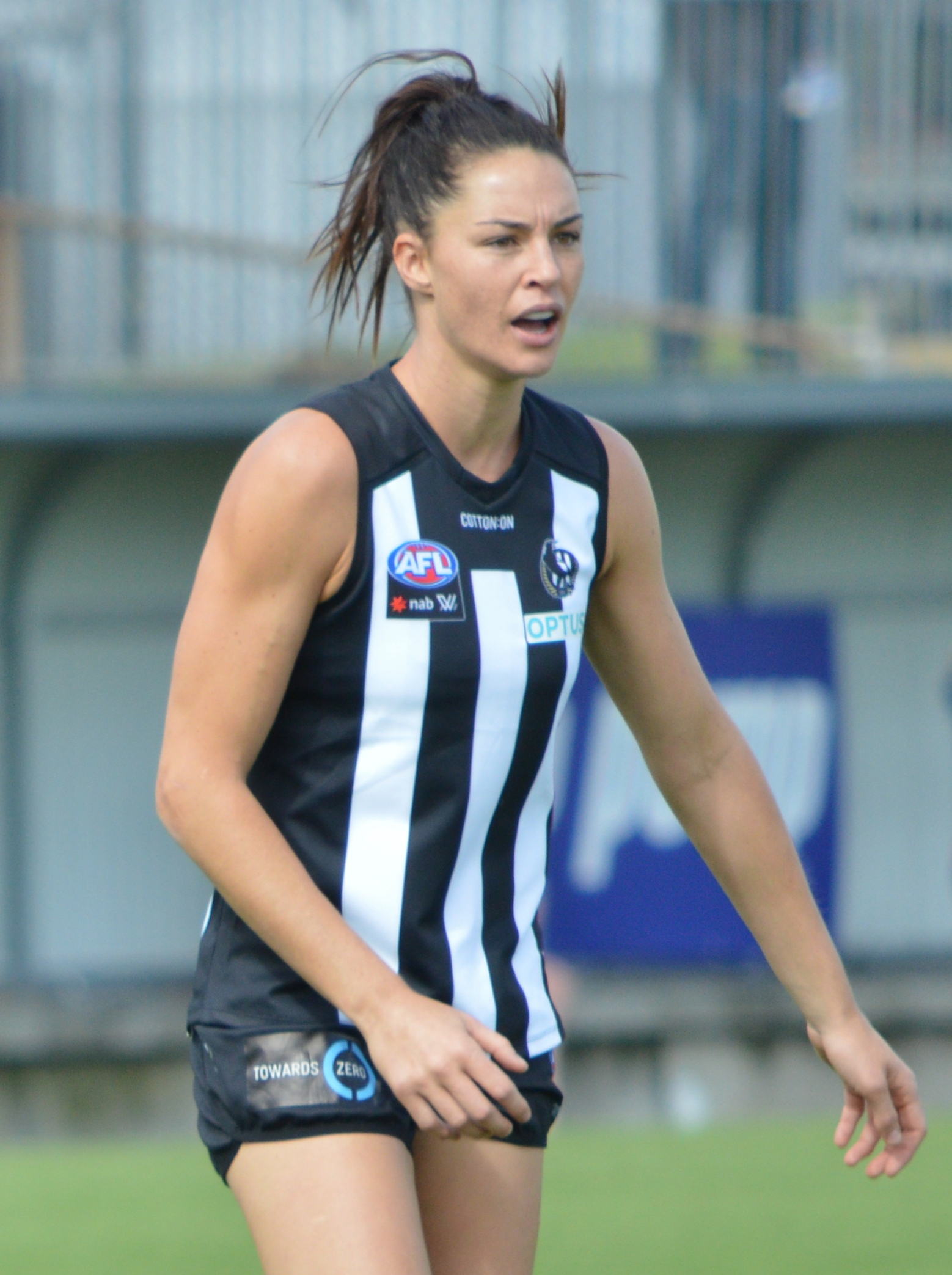
- Norder (née Layton) with Collingwood in February 2019

Personal information
- Full name: Sharni Norder (Née: Layton)
- Born: 6 January 1988 (age 38) Melbourne, Australia
- Height: 188 cm (6 ft 2 in)
- Spouse: Luke Norder (m. 2021)

Netball career
- Playing positions: GK, GD, WD
Years	Club team	Apps
2004–2006	Melbourne Kestrels	
2007	AIS Canberra Darters	
2008–2009	Melbourne Vixens	
2010–2013	Adelaide Thunderbirds	
2014–2016	New South Wales Swifts	
2017–2018	Collingwood Magpies	
Medal record
Representing Australia
Netball World Championships
Gold medal – first place	2011 Singapore	Netball
Gold medal – first place	2015 Australia	Netball
Commonwealth Games
Gold medal – first place	2014 Glasgow	Netball
- Updated on 15 January 2021

Sharni Norder (née Layton; born 6 January 1988) is a retired Australian sportsperson, known for her top level careers in netball and Australian rules football. Over fifteen years Norder played for six netball clubs in multiple elite competitions, and was a dual premiership player for the Adelaide Thunderbirds. She earned 46 caps for the Australia national netball team, won two gold medals at the Netball World Cup and one gold medal at the Commonwealth Games, and was captain of the team in 2017.

After ending her professional netball career at the Collingwood Magpies in 2018, Norder transitioned to Australian rules football and played for Collingwood's AFL Women's team. As a footballer, Norder earned All-Australian honours in 2020, was part of Collingwood's VFLW premiership in 2019 and was vice-captain of the club in 2021.

== Netball career ==
=== Domestic ===
Born in Mordialloc, Victoria, Layton began her career in 2004 for the Melbourne Kestrels. She then received a scholarship to the Australian Institute of Sport in 2007, and was awarded captaincy in 2009. In 2008, Layton was signed to play for the Melbourne Vixens in the ANZ Championship. She was not signed the following year, but in 2010 Layton transferred to the Adelaide Thunderbirds. In 2010, she was the winner of the ANZ Championship's young player of the year award. She was part of the Thunderbirds winning premiership team that year. The following year she was elevated to the position of vice-captain of the Thunderbirds under Captain Natalie von Bertouch, before becoming co-captain alongside von Bertouch in 2012. Her Thunderbirds career culminated with a stellar defensive performance in the 2013 ANZ Championship Grand Final, which Adelaide won 50–48 over the Queensland Firebirds.

On 29 July 2013, Layton signed with the New South Wales Swifts, where she grew in popularity over the next three seasons and was elevated in the team's leadership group.

In 2017, Layton was one of several high-profile signings for the Collingwood Magpies in the new Suncorp Super Netball league. After the conclusion of the 2017 season, which saw the Magpies fall short in a cliffhanger elimination final against the Giants, Layton revealed she would take an indefinite break from the sport due to severe exhaustion. Layton returned to the Magpies in time for the 2018 season.

On 18 July 2018, Layton announced she would retire from all levels of netball at the end of the season. She finished her career having played in more than 140 domestic matches, winning two premierships with the Adelaide Thunderbirds and claiming a player of the year award in 2016.

However, after playing for Collingwood's AFLW and VFLW sides in 2019, in December Layton registered to play netball with Peninsula Waves in 2020 in the Victorian Netball League.

=== International ===
Layton was a member of the Australian U21 team from 2006 to 2009 winning gold at the 2009 World Youth Netball Championships in the Cook Islands where she was vice captain of the side. Later that year, Layton was selected to debut for the Australian Netball Diamonds at the World Netball Championships in Singapore, where the team won a gold medal and the Holden Netball Test Series, regaining the No. 1 rank in the world. Following Layton's Grand Final performance she was named in the Australian Netball Diamonds squad to attend a selection camp at the AIS. Following the camp, Layton was named in the team to compete against New Zealand in the 2013 Constellation Cup and Malawi later in 2013. In 2014 Layton was named in the Australian National Netball Team to compete at the 2014 Commonwealth Games who went on to defeat the New Zealand National Netball Team in the gold medal match. This ended Australia's 12 year Commonwealth Games gold medal drought. Layton did not feature in the 2018 Quad Series or Commonwealth Games teams.

Layton ended her career having earned 46 national team caps. She is a two-time International Player of the Year winner and she captained the Diamonds in 2017.

== National career facts ==
=== National representation record ===
- 2010–2011, 2013-2017 Australian Diamonds
- 2009 Australian 21/U World Youth Netball Championships gold medal
- 2006-2009 Australian Under 21 Team

=== Achievements ===
- 2017 Aussie diamonds captain
- 2016 Australian ANZ Championship Player of the Year
- 2015 Netball World Cup Winner
- 2015 ANZ Championship Runner Up
- 2014 Commonwealth Games Gold Medal
- 2014 NSW Swifts Leadership Group
- 2012 Adelaide Thunderbirds Co-Captain
- 2011 World Champion with Australian Diamonds
- Winning the 2011 Holden Test Series to regain World No. 1 ranking with the Australian Diamonds
- 2011 Adelaide Thunderbirds Vice Captain
- 2010, 2013 ANZ Championship Premierships (Adelaide Thunderbirds)
- 2009 World Youth Netball Champion with Australian 21/U Team

=== Awards ===
- 2016 Australian ANZ Championship Player of the Year (NSW swifts)
- 2014 NSW Swifts Players' Player Award
- 2014 NSW Swifts Best Moment Award
- 2010 MARS ANZ Championship Best Young Player Award

== Australian rules football career ==
Shortly after retiring from netball, Norder was signed as a player with the Collingwood Football Club. She was part of Collingwood's VFL Women's premiership team in 2019. Norder played for Collingwood between 2019 and 2021. Over three seasons, she gradually transitioned into one of the premier rucks in the competition, which culminated in her selection in the 2020 AFL Women's All-Australian team. She announced her retirement from football after Collingwood's season ended against Brisbane in the preliminary final.

=== Statistics ===
Statistics are correct the end of the 2021 season.

Legend
G	Goals	K	Kicks	D	Disposals	T	Tackles
B	Behinds	H	Handballs	M	Marks

Season	Team	No.	Games	Totals							Averages (per game)						
Season	Team	No.	Games	G	B	K	H	D	M	T	G	B	K	H	D	M	T
2019	Collingwood	1	6	0	0	8	16	24	5	10	0.0	0.0	1.3	2.7	4.0	0.8	1.7
2020	Collingwood	1	7	3	1	27	44	71	17	19	0.4	0.1	3.9	6.3	10.1	2.4	2.7
2021	Collingwood	1	10	3	1	50	54	104	17	24	0.3	0.1	5.0	5.4	10.4	1.7	2.4
Career			23	6	2	85	114	199	39	53	0.3	0.1	3.7	5.0	8.7	1.7	2.3

== Personal life and works ==
Layton married her partner Luke Norder in January 2021. She is the author of a memoir, titled No Apologies, which was published by Affirm Press and was released in February 2021.
