= Kimberlee Green =

Australian netball player

Kimberlee Green OAM
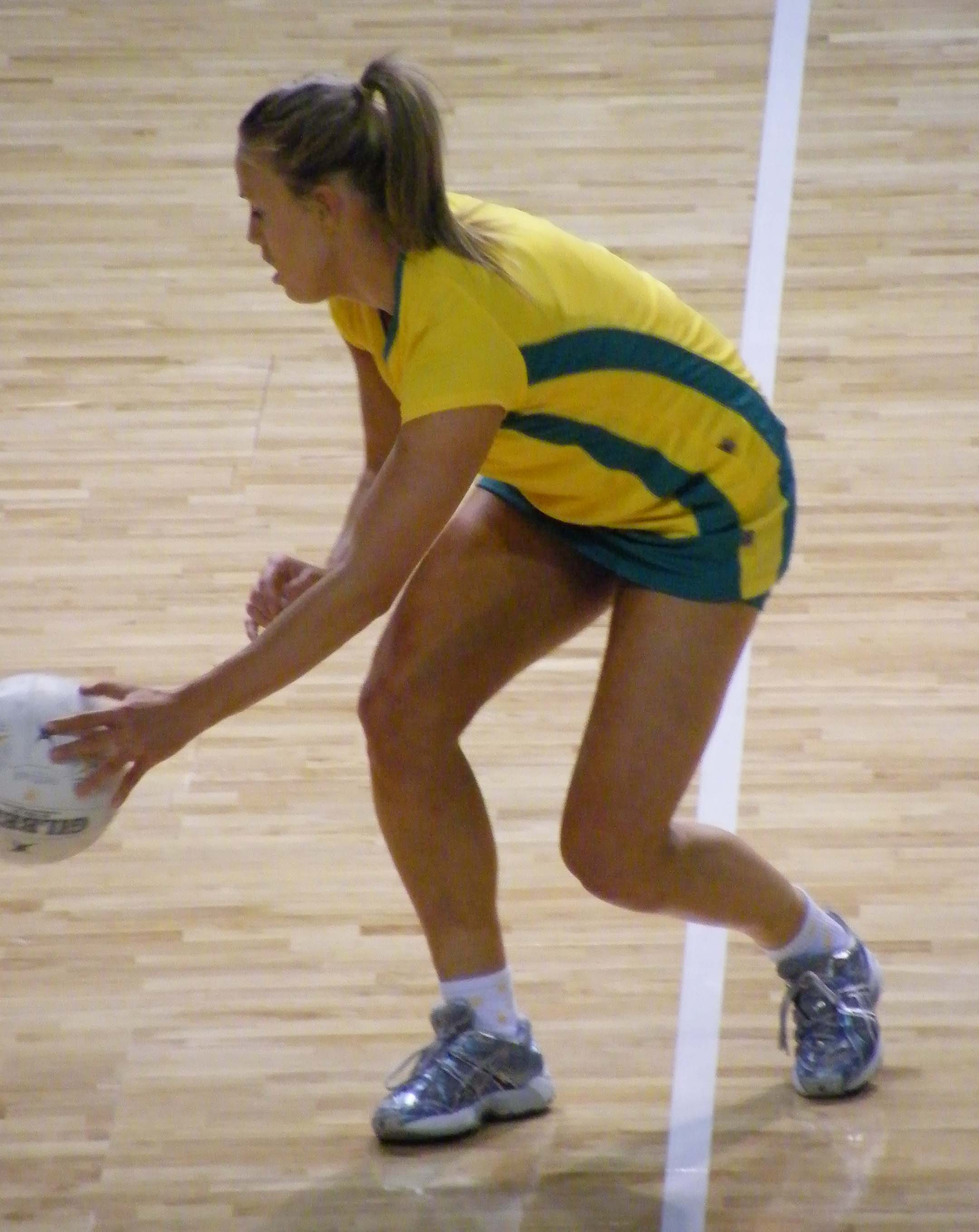
- Green in 2008

Personal information
- Born: 5 March 1986 (age 40)
- Height: 176 cm (5 ft 9 1/2 in)
- Spouse: Trent Copeland
- Relative: Denise Langford (Mother)
- School: St Patrick's College, Sutherland

Netball career
- Playing positions: C, WA, WD
Years	Club team	Apps
2002–07	Sydney Swifts and	55
2008–16	New South Wales Swifts	43
2017–19	Giants Netball	
Years	National team	Caps
2008–15	Australia	74
Medal record
Representing Australia
Commonwealth Games
Gold medal – first place	2014 Glasgow	Netball
Silver medal – second place	2010 Delhi	Netball
World Netball Series
Bronze medal – third place	2009 Manchester	Fastnet
World Netball Championships
Gold medal – first place	2011 Singapore	Netball
Gold medal – first place	2015 Australia	Netball
- Updated on 25 June 2010

Kimberlee Green OAM (born 5 March 1986) is an Australian former international netball player. Green was the captain of the Giants Netball team in the Suncorp Super Netball league and represented the Australian national netball team on 74 occasions.

== Career ==
Green played six years in the Commonwealth Bank Trophy, for the Sydney Swifts and AIS Canberra Darters. With the start of the ANZ Championship, Green signed with Sydney franchise the New South Wales Swifts, which won the inaugural championship in 2008. Later that year, she was selected for the Australian Netball Diamonds team. During her international career, Green has won a bronze medal at the 2009 World Netball Series in Manchester, and a silver medal at the 2010 Commonwealth Games in Delhi, a gold medal at the 2011 World Netball Championships in Singapore and a gold medal at the 2014 Commonwealth Games in Glasgow.

In 2011, for the first time for Australia, Green played at the Wing Defence (WD) position in the first of three tests against Jamaica. In 2014 Green was named in the Australian Netball Team to compete at the 2014 Commonwealth Games who went on to win gold. Green went on to captain NSW Swifts in the 2014 season. After the 2015 Netball World Cup, which Green was part of as a gold-medallist with Australia, she announced her retirement from international netball.

In 2017, she was appointed inaugural captain of the Giants Netball team. She suffered a season-ending ACL injury in the Giants' round five win over the Adelaide Thunderbirds in Canberra. She returned to captain the Giants to a preliminary final in the 2018 season. On 22 August 2019, Green announced her retirement from professional netball.

In 2021 Green was appointed to the role of Opens Head Coach for the North Shore United in the NSW Premier League, following the departure of former coach Bec Bulley.

== Awards and recognition ==
- 2022 Australia Day Honours, Medal of the Order of Australia
- 2014 ANZ Championship joint-MVP
- 2014 FOXTEL ANZ Championship All-Star Team (WA)
- 2013–2014 QBE NSW Swifts Most Valued Player
- 2011–2014 NSW Swifts' Members' Player of the Year
- 2010 NSW Swifts' Players' Player

== Netball career facts ==
- 2015 World Championship gold medal
- 2014 Australian Netball Diamonds Captain (England Series)
- 2014 Australian Netball Diamonds Commonwealth Games Netball Gold Medal
- 2014 Australian Netball Diamonds Vice-Captain
- 2014 NSW Swifts Captain
- 2013 Australian Netball Diamonds Vice-Captain in two-test Malawi Queens series
- 2012–2013 NSW Swifts co-Captain
- 2011 World Championship gold medal (extra-time)
- 2010 Commonwealth Games silver medallist (double extra-time)
- 2008 ANZ Championship victory with the NSW Swifts (inaugural season)
- 2006–2007 CBT Champions

== Personal life ==
Green is the daughter of South Sydney Rabbitohs footballer Michael Green and Olympic & Commonwealth Games swimmer Denise Langford.

Green is married to New South Wales Blues cricketer Trent Copeland.
