= Sarah Klau =

Australian netball player

Personal information
- Born: 30 September 1994 (age 31) Adelaide, South Australia
- Height: 190 cm (6 ft 3 in)
- School: Yorketown Area School (Australia)

Netball career
- Playing positions: GK, GD
Years	Club team	Apps
2016–2017	Adelaide Thunderbirds	
2018–present	New South Wales Swifts	
Medal record
Netball
Representing Australia
Netball World Cup
Silver medal – second place	2019 Liverpool	Team
Gold medal – first place	2023 Cape Town	Team
Commonwealth Games
Gold medal – first place	2022 Birmingham	Netball

Sarah Klau (born 30 September 1994) is an Australian netball player in the Suncorp Super Netball league, playing for the New South Wales Swifts.

== Career ==
Klau began her netball career for the Adelaide Thunderbirds in 2016, before moving to the New South Wales Swifts for the inaugural season of the new Suncorp Super Netball league. She impressed in her debut match in round 1 and went on to feature consistently in the Swifts backline team. She was selected in the Australian Diamonds squad for the 2018/19 international season.
