= Briony Akle =

Australian netball player and coach

Personal information
- Full name: Briony Akle (Née: Thornley)
- Born: c. 16 August 1977 (age 49)
- School: Castle Hill High School
- University: University of Western Sydney

Netball career
- Playing positions: WA, C
Years	Club team	Apps
1999–2004	Sydney Swifts	53
Coaching career
- Years: Team
- 2011: NSW Under-17s
- 2014: NNSW Blues
- 2014–2015: NSW Under-19s
- 2016–2017: NNSW Waratahs
- 2016–2017: NSWIS
- 2017–2026: New South Wales Swifts

Briony Akle is an Australian former netball player and current netball coach. Between 1999 and 2004, Akle played for Sydney Swifts in the Commonwealth Bank Trophy league. Akle was a member of the Sydney Swifts teams that won premierships in 2001 and 2004. Since 2017 she has been head coach of New South Wales Swifts, guiding them to the 2019 and 2021 Suncorp Super Netball titles.

== Early life, education and family ==
Akle grew up in Sydney's northwestern suburbs. Between 1990 and 1995, she attended Castle Hill High School. She graduated from the University of Western Sydney after completing a Bachelor of Applied Science in Sports Management. Akle is married to Sarkis Akle, a hairdresser and salon owner. She is the mother of four sons – Xavier (born c. 2016), Sebastian (born c. 2006) and twins Charlie and Sam (born c. 2009).

== Playing career ==
=== Sydney Swifts ===
Between 1999 and 2004, Akle made 53 appearances for Sydney Swifts in the Commonwealth Bank Trophy league. Her team mates at Sydney Swifts included Megan Anderson, Catherine Cox and Liz Ellis. Akle was a member of the Swifts teams that won premierships in 2001 and 2004. She played as a wing attack in both the 2001 and 2004 grand finals.

== Coaching career ==
=== New South Wales ===
Between 2011 and 2015, Akle served as an assistant coach or head coach of various teams that represented New South Wales at the Australian National Netball Championships. In 2011 she was head coach of the under-17 team that were runners-up. In 2012 she was assistant coach of the under-21 team that won the title. In 2014 and 2015 she was head coach of the under-19 teams. In 2015 Akle guided the under-19s to the title.

=== Australian Netball League ===
Between 2014 and 2017, Akle served as an assistant coach or head coach for teams that represented New South Wales in the Australian Netball League. In 2014 she was head coach of NNSW Blues. In 2015 she was assistant coach with NNSW Waratahs. Between 2016 and 2017 she was head coach of Waratahs. In 2016 and she guided them to the ANL grand final.

=== NSWIS ===
In 2016, Akle was appointed head coach of the New South Wales Institute of Sport netball program. In July 2017, Akle coached the NSWIS team that finished third in the 2017 Netball New Zealand Super Club tournament. The NSWIS team was a composite team featuring players from both New South Wales Swifts and Giants Netball.

=== New South Wales Swifts ===
In September 2017, ahead of the 2018 season, Akle was appointed head coach of New South Wales Swifts, replacing Rob Wright. In 2019, she guided Swifts to their first Suncorp Super Netball title. In the grand final they defeated Sunshine Coast Lightning 64–47. She was subsequently named the 2019 Joyce Brown Coach of the Year. In 2021, despite having to go into isolation and having restrictions preventing her from entering Queensland due the COVID-19 pandemic, Akle guided Swifts to their second Suncorp Super Netball title. In the grand final they defeated Giants Netball 63–59.

Silver Ferns

In April 2026, Akle was appointed as Assistant Coach of the Silver Ferns.

== Other employment ==
Between September 2004 and February 2006, Akle worked as an administration coordinator for Sydney Swifts. Between February 2010 and January 2013, she worked as a community relations manager for Sydney Roosters. Between February 2013 and February 2019 she worked as a community relations manager for Parramatta Eels.

== Honours ==
=== Player ===
Sydney Swifts

- Commonwealth Bank Trophy
  - Winners: 2001, 2004

=== Coach ===
New South Wales Swifts

- Suncorp Super Netball
  - Winners: 2019, 2021
  - Runners up: 2023

NNSW Waratahs

- Australian Netball League
  - Runners up: 2016

New South Wales

- Australian National Netball Championships
  - Winner: Under-19 (2015)
  - Runners up: Under-17 (2011)

=== Individual awards ===
Year	Award
2019	Joyce Brown Coach of the Year
