= Maddy Turner =

Australian netball player

Personal information
- Born: 17 December 1995 (age 30) Adelaide, South Australia
- Height: 1.83 m (6 ft 0 in)
- School: St Michael's College, Adelaide
- University: Flinders University

Netball career
- Playing positions: GD, WD, GK
Years	Club team	Apps
2016–2026	New South Wales Swifts	163
Years	National team	Caps
2022	Australian Diamonds	4

Maddy Turner (born 17 December 1995) is an Australian netball player in the Suncorp Super Netball league, most notably known for her lengthy playing career with the NSW Swifts.

Turner was born in Adelaide, South Australia. She began playing netball at an elite level during her youth, representing Australia at under-17, under-19 and under-21 level. In 2015, she represented South Australia at the National Under-21 Championships.

Turner was signed by the New South Wales Swifts ahead of the 2016 season. She played every match for the Swifts during the season, including the grand final, in which the team lost narrowly to the Queensland Firebirds. She subsequently received the Swifts Coaches Award in both the 2017 and 2018 seasons.

Turner has also represented Australia at the Fast5 Netball World Series.

Turner currently sits on the board of the Australian Netball Players’ Association.

Since joining the Swifts, Turner has become one of the club’s longest-serving players and a cornerstone of its defensive unit. She has won multiple premiership titles with the team, including the 2019 and 2021 Suncorp Super Netball championships, and was named the 2021 Grand Final Most Valuable Player.

Turner has also been part of the Swifts’ leadership group for several seasons and was appointed co-captain alongside Paige Hadley for the 2025 season. In 2026, head coach Briony Akle announced that Turner would lead the Swifts as captain for the 2026 season, with teammate Helen Housby joining her as vice captain.

At the end of the 2026 season, Turner announced that she would depart the NSW Swifts after 11 seasons with the club.
