= Super Netball =

Top level Australian netball league

Suncorp Super Netball
- Current season, competition or edition: 2027 Super Netball season
- Sport: Netball
- Founded: 2016
- First season: 2017
- Owner: Netball Australia
- No. of teams: 8
- Country: Australia
- Most recent champion: Adelaide Thunderbirds (2026)
- Most titles: Adelaide Thunderbirds (3)
- Broadcasters: Channel Nine (2017–21; 2027–); Fox Sports (2022–2026)
- Streaming partners: 9Now and Stan Sport (2027–); Kayo Sports (2022–2026); BINGE (2025–2026)
- Sponsor: Suncorp Group (2017–2026)
- Related competitions: Super Netball Reserves; ANZ Championship; Commonwealth Bank Trophy
- Website: netball.com.au/supernetball

Super Netball, also known by its abbreviated name SN, and formerly known as Suncorp Super Netball (SSN), is a professional netball league in Australia. It superseded the trans-Tasman ANZ Championship, which also included teams from New Zealand, as the top-level netball league in Australia in 2017. Since 2019, the league has been governed on behalf of Netball Australia by an independent commission. The league currently does not have a title sponsor. From 2017 to 2026, Suncorp Group sponsored the league. Sunshine Coast Lightning were the inaugural Super Netball champions, and the Adelaide Thunderbirds have won the most titles with three.

== History ==
In May 2016, Netball Australia and Netball New Zealand announced that the ANZ Championship would be discontinued after the 2016 season. In Australia, its replacement league – initially known as simply the National Netball League before an official name was decided upon – included the five former Australian ANZ Championship teams (Adelaide Thunderbirds, Melbourne Vixens, New South Wales Swifts, Queensland Firebirds and West Coast Fever) plus three brand new franchises: Collingwood Magpies, GIANTS Netball and Sunshine Coast Lightning.

With a team coached by Noeline Taurua, captained by Geva Mentor and also featuring Caitlin Bassett, Karla Pretorius and Stephanie Wood, Sunshine Coast Lightning finished the 2017 season as inaugural champions after defeating GIANTS Netball 65–48 in the grand final. In 2018 they retained the title after defeating West Coast Fever 62–59 in the grand final.

In 2019, Briony Akle guided New South Wales Swifts to their first Super Netball title. Despite losing their new captain, Maddy Proud, to injury early in the season, Swifts finished the regular season in second place. In the major semi-final, they lost to Sunshine Coast Lightning. However, they then defeated Melbourne Vixens in the preliminary final. In the grand final they faced Lightning again but this time defeated them 64–47 to emerge as champions.

In 2020, with a team coached again by Simone McKinnis and co-captained by Kate Moloney and Liz Watson, Melbourne Vixens finished the season as both minor premiers and overall champions. In the grand final they defeated West Coast Fever 66–64. In 2021, with a team coached by Briony Akle and co-captained by Maddy Proud and Paige Hadley, New South Wales Swifts won their second Super Netball title. In the grand final they defeated GIANTS Netball 63–59.

In 2022, head coach Dan Ryan and captain Courtney Bruce led West Coast Fever to their first premiership. In the grand final they defeated Melbourne Vixens 70–59. In May 2023, news reports disclosed that the Collingwood Magpies were in financial distress, and later that month the Collingwood Football Club announced it would withdraw its netball team at the conclusion of the 2023 season. The 2023 premiership was won by the Adelaide Thunderbirds, defeating the Swifts 60–59 after extra time was required in the grand final. It was the Thunderbirds' first national league premiership in a decade, and came off the back of years of lowly finishes in Super Netball.

Following the demise of the Magpies, speculation circled as to who would be awarded the eighth license for the 2024 season and beyond. Submissions for the new license closed on 20 June 2023, with as many as six initial bids being whittled down to two by the closing date, according to media reports. On 21 July 2023, the league announced that the Sports Entertainment Network (SEN), led by chief executive Craig Hutchison, was awarded the license for a team to be based in south-east Melbourne. As part of the licensing agreement, Netball Australia will operate the team for the rest of 2023 before transitioning to SEN for 2024 and beyond. ABC News reported that the SEN bid was preferred by broadcasters Fox Netball over the alternate bid put forward by Netball Victoria, which suggested a regional team 'floating' between Geelong, Bendigo or Ballarat.

Two years after the Magpies demise, speculation arose that GIANTS Netball might also be removed from the competition. As the side's form dipped throughout 2024 and 2025 and financial losses accumulated, ABC News reported that hospitality and lifestyle franchise Mounties Group (owner of the Mounties Rugby League Football Club) were interested in acquiring the license held by GIANTS Netball. By the end of the 2026 season, in which the Giants won only one game, both Sports Entertainment Network (SEN) and Wests Group (owner of the Newcastle Knights rugby league club) were in discussions with Netball New South Wales about taking over the license. On 3 August 2026, Netball Australia announced it had approved a transfer of license ownership from GIANTS Netball to Sports Entertainment Network, making SEN the owner of two franchises in the competition. The Giants branding was discontinued, and on 19 August SEN revealed the team would be called the Sydney Sirens, accompanied by a coral and teal colour palette. The name has been objected to by representatives of the Sydney Sirens ice hockey team, who compete in the Australian Women's Ice Hockey League and reportedly intend to lodge a formal opposition to SEN's trademark application.

== Clubs ==
=== Current clubs ===
Club	Icon	Location	State	Head coach	Home venue	Est.	SSN seasons		SSN premierships	
Club	Icon	Location	State	Head coach	Home venue	Est.	First	Total	Total	Most recent
Adelaide Thunderbirds		Adelaide	South Australia	Tania Obst	Adelaide Entertainment Centre	1996	2017	10	3	2026
Melbourne Mavericks		Melbourne	(Victoria (state)) Victoria	Gerard Murphy	John Cain Arena	2023	2024	3	—	—
Melbourne Vixens		Melbourne	(Victoria (state)) Victoria	Di Honey	John Cain Arena	2007	2017	10	2	2025
New South Wales Swifts		Sydney	New South Wales	Dylan Nexhip	Ken Rosewall Arena	2007	2017	10	2	2021
Queensland Firebirds		Brisbane	Queensland	Kiri Wills	Nissan Arena	1996	2017	10	—	—
Sunshine Coast Lightning		Sunshine Coast	Queensland	Belinda Reynolds	UniSC Arena	2016	2017	10	2	2018
Sydney Sirens		Western Sydney	New South Wales	Nerida Stewart	Quaycentre; Ken Rosewall Arena (Sydney Derby only); WIN Entertainment Centre (one game)	2026	2027			
West Coast Fever		Perth	Western Australia	Dan Ryan	RAC Arena	1996 (Note: As Perth Orioles)	2017	10	1	2022

=== Former clubs ===
Club	Icon	Location	State	Home venue	Est.	SSN seasons			SSN premierships	
Club	Icon	Location	State	Home venue	Est.	First	Last	Total	Total	Most recent
Collingwood Magpies		Melbourne	(Victoria (state)) Victoria	John Cain Arena	2016	2017	2023	7	—	—
GIANTS Netball		Sydney	New South Wales	Ken Rosewall Arena	2016	2017	2026	10	—	—

== Venues ==
=== Current venues ===
The following table shows a list of all of venues that are to be used throughout the 2027 Super Netball season. Where venues have had other/sponsored names, only those names in place from when the venue was being used in the league have been listed.

Current Super Netball venues
Venue	Location	State	Capacity	First used	Current tenant(s)
RAC Arena	Perth	Western Australia	14,000	2017	West Coast Fever
Ken Rosewall Arena	Sydney	New South Wales	10,500	2021	New South Wales Swifts; Sydney Sirens
John Cain Arena	Melbourne	Victoria	10,300	2017	Melbourne Mavericks; Melbourne Vixens
Adelaide Entertainment Centre	Adelaide	South Australia	10,000	2018	Adelaide Thunderbirds
WIN Entertainment Centre	Wollongong	New South Wales	5,673	2026	Sydney Sirens
Nissan Arena	Brisbane	Queensland	5,000	2019	Queensland Firebirds
Quaycentre	Sydney	New South Wales	4,500	2017	Sydney Sirens
UniSC Arena	Sunshine Coast	Queensland	3,000	2017	Sunshine Coast Lightning

=== Former venues ===
The following table shows a list of all of venues that have been used throughout the entirety of Super Netball. Where venues have had other/sponsored names, only those names in place from when the venue was being used in the league have been listed.

Former Super Netball venues
Venue	Other/sponsored name(s)	Location	State	Capacity	First used	Last used	Tenant(s)
Brisbane Convention & Exhibition Centre		Brisbane	Queensland	4,000	2017	2017	Queensland Firebirds
Gold Coast Convention and Exhibition Centre		Gold Coast	Queensland	5,269	2017	2017	Queensland Firebirds
Perth High Performance Centre	HBF Stadium	Perth	Western Australia	4,500	2017	2018	West Coast Fever
AIS Arena		Canberra	Australian Capital Territory	4,200	2017	2019	GIANTS Netball
Brisbane Entertainment Centre		Brisbane	Queensland	11,000	2017	2019	Queensland Firebirds
Margaret Court Arena		Melbourne	Victoria	7,500	2017	2019	Collingwood Magpies; Melbourne Vixens
Silverdome		Launceston	Tasmania	3,250	2017	2023	Collingwood Magpies
Netball SA Stadium		Adelaide	South Australia	3,200	2017	2025	Adelaide Thunderbirds
Adelaide Arena	Titanium Security Arena; Adelaide 36ers Arena	Adelaide	South Australia	8,000	2017	2026	Adelaide Thunderbirds
Qudos Bank Arena		Sydney	New South Wales	18,000	2017	2026	New South Wales Swifts; GIANTS Netball
Gold Coast Sports and Leisure Centre		Gold Coast	Queensland	5,300	2018	2018	Queensland Firebirds
International Convention Centre Sydney		Sydney	New South Wales	7,200	2018	2018	GIANTS Netball
Territory Netball Stadium		Darwin	Northern Territory	2,000	2019	2019	Adelaide Thunderbirds
Melbourne Sports Centres - Parkville	Parkville Stadium; State Netball & Hockey Centre	Melbourne	Victoria	3,500	2019	2022	Melbourne Vixens; Collingwood Magpies
Red Energy Stadium	Bendigo Stadium	Bendigo	Victoria	4,000	2019	2026	Collingwood Magpies; Melbourne Mavericks
Cairns Pop-Up Arena		Cairns	Queensland	2,000	2020	2020	West Coast Fever; Adelaide Thunderbirds; Melbourne Vixens
Townsville Entertainment and Convention Centre		Townsville	Queensland	5,257	2020	2020	Collingwood Magpies
MyState Bank Arena		Hobart	Tasmania	4,340	2022	2025	Melbourne Mavericks

== Season structure ==
=== Pre-season ===
Beginning in 2019, a structured round-robin tournament known as the Team Girls Cup has been conducted, named for the titular campaign established in 2017 that aims to decrease the dropout rate in junior netball. The league's eight teams are divided into two pools, where they play each of their fellow pool members once. A fourth round is then held to determine final placings across the combined pools, and a champion is crowned from the match held between the two top-ranked pool teams. Matches are held over three consecutive days and are all played at the same venue. Locations to have hosted the tournament so far include Brisbane, Melbourne and the Gold Coast.

List of Team Girls Cup champions
Season	Champions	Runners-up	Score	Venue	Grand Final MVP	Ref.
2019	Collingwood Magpies	Melbourne Vixens	39–33	Queensland State Netball Centre	Shimona Nelson (Collingwood Magpies)	
2020	Cancelled due to COVID-19 pandemic			Ken Rosewall Arena	—N/a	
2021	Not held due to COVID-19 pandemic					
2022	Melbourne Vixens	West Coast Fever	45–43	Parkville Stadium	Kate Moloney (Melbourne Vixens)	
2023	West Coast Fever	Adelaide Thunderbirds	49–41	Gold Coast Sports and Leisure Centre	Sasha Glasgow (West Coast Fever)	
2024	New South Wales Swifts	Melbourne Vixens	45–44	Ken Rosewall Arena	Maddy Proud (New South Wales Swifts)	
2025	Adelaide Thunderbirds	West Coast Fever	38–37	Netball SA Stadium	Latanya Wilson (Adelaide Thunderbirds)	
2026	Not held, individual clubs organised individual pre-season fixtures					

=== Regular season ===
The regular season is played across 14 rounds, with the league's eight teams playing each other twice in home and away fixtures.

=== Finals series ===
^{+}	Team also won the minor premiership for finishing on top of the ladder
^{^}	Player also won the Player of the Year Award

List of Super Netball premiers
Season	Premiers	Runners-up	Score	Venue	Grand Final MVP	Ref.
2017	Sunshine Coast Lightning	GIANTS Netball	65–48	Brisbane Entertainment Centre	Karla Pretorius (Sunshine Coast Lightning)	
2018	Sunshine Coast Lightning (2)	West Coast Fever	62–59	Perth Arena	Caitlin Bassett (Sunshine Coast Lightning)	
2019	New South Wales Swifts	Sunshine Coast Lightning	64–47	Brisbane Entertainment Centre	Samantha Wallace (New South Wales Swifts)	
2020	Melbourne Vixens^{+}	West Coast Fever (2)	66–64	Nissan Arena	Mwai Kumwenda (Melbourne Vixens)	
2021	New South Wales Swifts (2)	GIANTS Netball (2)	63–59	Nissan Arena	Maddy Turner (New South Wales Swifts)	
2022	West Coast Fever	Melbourne Vixens	70–59	RAC Arena	Sasha Glasgow (West Coast Fever)	
2023	Adelaide Thunderbirds	New South Wales Swifts	60–59	John Cain Arena	Eleanor Cardwell (Adelaide Thunderbirds)	
2024	Adelaide Thunderbirds^{+} (2)	Melbourne Vixens (2)	59–57	Adelaide Entertainment Centre	Romelda Aiken-George (Adelaide Thunderbirds)	
2025	Melbourne Vixens (2)	West Coast Fever (3)	59–58	Rod Laver Arena	Kiera Austin (Melbourne Vixens)	
2026	Adelaide Thunderbirds^{+} (3)	Melbourne Vixens (3)	61–40	John Cain Arena	Latanya Wilson (Adelaide Thunderbirds)	

== Minor premierships ==
Season	Winners
2017	Melbourne Vixens
2018	GIANTS Netball
2019	Sunshine Coast Lightning
2020	Melbourne Vixens
2021	GIANTS Netball
2022	Melbourne Vixens
2023	New South Wales Swifts
2024	Adelaide Thunderbirds
2025	West Coast Fever
2026	Adelaide Thunderbirds

== Premiership winning coaches ==
Season	Head coaches	Team
2017	Noeline Taurua	Sunshine Coast Lightning
2018	Noeline Taurua	Sunshine Coast Lightning
2019	Briony Akle	New South Wales Swifts
2020	Simone McKinnis	Melbourne Vixens
2021	Briony Akle	New South Wales Swifts
2022	Dan Ryan	West Coast Fever
2023	Tania Obst	Adelaide Thunderbirds
2024	Tania Obst	Adelaide Thunderbirds
2025	Simone McKinnis	Melbourne Vixens
2026	Tania Obst	Adelaide Thunderbirds

== Premiership winning captains ==
Season	Captains	Team
2017	Geva Mentor	Sunshine Coast Lightning
2018	Geva Mentor	Sunshine Coast Lightning
2019	Maddy Proud	New South Wales Swifts
2020	Kate Moloney; Liz Watson	Melbourne Vixens
2021	Maddy Proud; Paige Hadley	New South Wales Swifts
2022	Courtney Bruce	West Coast Fever
2023	Hannah Petty	Adelaide Thunderbirds
2024	Hannah Petty	Adelaide Thunderbirds
2025	Kate Moloney	Melbourne Vixens
2026	Shamera Sterling-Humphrey; Georgie Horjus	Adelaide Thunderbirds

== Broadcasting ==
Seasons	Live broadcasters
2017–2021	Nine Network; Telstra TV
2022–2026	Fox Sports; Kayo Sports
2027–present	Nine Network; 9Now; Stan Sport

== Commission ==
In January 2019, Netball Australia announced it would form an independent commission to become the governing body of Super Netball. In April 2019 they named five commissioners which included Marne Fechner, Netball Australia's CEO. Two more commissioners were appointed in May and August 2019.

== Sponsorship ==
In October 2016, Suncorp Group was announced as Netball Australia's principal partner from 2017 to 2021. The agreement included naming rights to the new league. In August 2021, this agreement was renewed for another five years. The partnership was not renewed after the 2026, meaning the 2027 season will be the first run without Suncorp as the league's naming rights sponsor.

Other current sponsorship partners include the Australian Sports Commission, HCF, Nissan, Woolworths, Visit Victoria, Priceline Pharmacy, the Nine Network and News Corp Australia.

== Awards ==
- Player of the Year
- Grand Final MVP
- Rookie of the Year
- Leading Goalscorer
- Joyce Brown Coach of the Year
- Lorna McConchie Umpire of the Year
- Team of the Year
- Australian Netball Players' Association (ANPA) Attacker of the Year
- ANPA Midcourter of the Year
- ANPA Defender of the Year
- ANPA International Player of the Year
