= New South Wales Swifts =

Australian netball team

- Founded: 2007
- Based in: Sydney
- Regions: New South Wales
- Home venue: Ken Rosewall Arena
- Head coach: Dylan Nexhip
- Asst coach: Jo Harten
- Captain: Maddy Turner
- Premierships: 3 (2008, 2019, 2021)
- League: Super Netball; ANZ Championship (2008-2016)
- 2026 placing: 5th
- Website: nswswifts.com.au
Playing dress	Alternate (heritage)

New South Wales Swifts are an Australian professional netball team based in Sydney, New South Wales. Since 2017 they have represented Netball New South Wales in Super Netball. Between 2008 and 2016, they played in the ANZ Championship. The team was formed in 2007 when Netball New South Wales merged its two former Commonwealth Bank Trophy league teams, Sydney Swifts and Hunter Jaegers. In 2008, Swifts were the inaugural ANZ Championship winners. Swifts were also grand finalists in 2015 and 2016. They won their second and third premierships in 2019 and 2021. The Swifts play their home games at Ken Rosewall Arena in Sydney.

== History ==
=== ANZ Championship ===
Between 2008 and 2016, Swifts played in the ANZ Championship. Swifts were formed in late 2007 when Netball New South Wales merged its two former Commonwealth Bank Trophy league teams, Sydney Swifts and Hunter Jaegers, in order to enter a single team in the 2008 ANZ Championship. During the 2008 regular season Swifts won 10 of their 13 matches and finished second behind Waikato Bay of Plenty Magic. With a team coached by Julie Fitzgerald and captained by Catherine Cox, Swifts subsequently defeated Magic in both the major semi–final and the grand final to become the inaugural ANZ Championship winners. Swifts went through the entire 2010 regular season home and away undefeated, winning 13 consecutive matches and finishing as minor premiers. They were the first team in the history of the ANZ Championship to do this. However they subsequently lost both the major semi-final and the preliminary final to Adelaide Thunderbirds and Magic respectively and finished the season in third place.

The 2011, 2012 and 2013 seasons proved to be a turbulent time for Swifts. After fifteen seasons as Sydney Swifts/New South Wales Swifts head coach, 2011 was the last season that Julie Fitzgerald served as head coach. Following a controversial "internal review", Fitzgerald was replaced as head coach by Lisa Beehag. The review was conducted during the 2011 season. Catherine Cox and Liz Ellis publicly criticized Netball New South Wales for distracting players with the review and even alleged that it was responsible for Swifts losing the 2011 minor semi-final. Beehag subsequently informed Cox that she would not be needed as a captain or player the following season. Cox subsequently departed for West Coast Fever. Other senior and emerging players including Rebecca Bulley, Courtney Tairi and Ashleigh Brazill also left. It was also alleged that the controversy led to some emerging New South Wales players, including Verity Simmons, Gabi Simpson and Kim Ravaillion, taking up contracts with rival teams. Under the leadership of Fitzgerald and Fox, New South Wales Swifts had been champions in 2008 and had reached the final series/play-offs in 2010 and 2011. Under Beehag's two-year reign, the team failed to make the finals. In 2013, the Swifts finished eighth. At the end of 2013 Beehag's contract was not renewed.

Beehag was subsequently replaced by Rob Wright. Wright guided Swifts to two successive grand finals in 2015 and 2016. However, on both occasions they lost out to Queensland Firebirds.

Regular season statistics
Season	Position	Won	Drawn	Lost
2008	2nd	10	0	3
2009	9th	2	0	11
2010	1st	13	0	0
2011	3rd	9	0	4
2012	5th	8	0	5
2013	8th	4	0	9
2014	3rd	9	0	4
2015	2nd	8	3	2
2016	3rd	10	2	1

Premierships
Runners Up

=== Super Netball ===
Since 2017, Swifts have played in Super Netball. In addition to Swifts, the new league featured a second Netball New South Wales team, Giants Netball. Two veteran members of the 2016 Swifts roster, Kimberlee Green and Susan Pettitt, subsequently switched to the Giants, who were coached by former Swifts head coach, Julie Fitzgerald. The 2018 season saw Rob Wright replaced by Briony Akle. In 2019, Akle guided Swifts to their second premiership when they won the Super Netball title. Despite losing their new captain, Maddy Proud, to injury early in the season, Swifts finished the regular season in second place. In the major semi-final, they lost to Sunshine Coast Lightning. However, they then defeated Melbourne Vixens in the preliminary final. In the grand final they faced Lightning again but time defeated them 64–47 to emerge as champions. In 2021 with a team coached by Briony Akle and co-captained by Maddy Proud and Paige Hadley, Swifts won their second Suncorp Super Netball title. In the grand final they defeated Giants Netball 63–59.

Regular season statistics
Season	Position	Won	Drawn	Lost
2017	6th	3	1	10
2018	6th	6	1	7
2019	2nd	10	1	3
2020	4th	8	1	5
2021	2nd	9	0	5
2022	5th	6	0	8
2023	1st	10	1	3
2024	6th	4	0	10
2025	2nd	10	0	4
2026	5th	5	0	9

Premierships

== Grand finals ==
ANZ Championship

Season	Winners	Score	Runners up	Venue
2008	New South Wales Swifts	65–56	Waikato Bay of Plenty Magic	Acer Arena
2015	Queensland Firebirds	57–56	New South Wales Swifts	Brisbane Convention & Exhibition Centre
2016	Queensland Firebirds	69–67	New South Wales Swifts	Brisbane Convention & Exhibition Centre

Super Netball

Season	Winners	Score	Runners up	Venue
2019	New South Wales Swifts	64–47	Sunshine Coast Lightning	Brisbane Entertainment Centre
2021	New South Wales Swifts	63–59	Giants Netball	Nissan Arena
2023	Adelaide Thunderbirds	60–59	New South Wales Swifts	John Cain Arena

== Home venues ==
Since 2021, the Swifts play most home games at Ken Rosewall Arena, with occasional matches at Afterpay Arena. The club's administration and training base is shared with GIANTS Netball and Netball NSW at Netball Central in Sydney Olympic Park.

Between 2008 and 2019, Swifts played the majority of their home games at the Sydney Olympic Park Sports Centre. The club has also previously played home games at the Newcastle Entertainment Centre in Newcastle and the AIS Arena in Canberra.

== Notable players ==
=== 2027 squad ===
2027 New South Wales Swifts roster
Players
Coaching staff

Nat.	Name	Position(s)	DoB	Height
(Uganda)	Mary Cholhok	GS	3 January 1997 (age 29)	2.01 m (6 ft 7 in)
(Australia)	Jordan Cransberg	C, WA, WD	16 November 1999 (age 27)	1.76 m (5 ft 9 in)
(Australia)	Rudi Ellis	GK, GD	13 August 1997 (age 29)	1.90 m (6 ft 3 in)
(Australia)	Tayla Fraser	WA, C, WD	13 June 1999 (age 27)	1.72 m (5 ft 8 in)
(Australia)	Matilda Garrett	GK, GD	11 August 1998 (age 28)	1.85 m (6 ft 1 in)
(Australia)	Paige Hadley	C, WA, WD	26 August 1992 (age 34)	1.73 m (5 ft 8 in)
(England)	Helen Housby	GA, GS	19 January 1995 (age 31)	1.83 m (6 ft 0 in)
(Australia)	Sarah Klau	GK, GD	30 September 1994 (age 32)	1.90 m (6 ft 3 in)
(Australia)	Lucy Voyvodic	WD, C	14 June 2005 (age 21)	1.76 m (5 ft 9 in)
(Australia)	Grace Whyte	GA, WA, GS	12 April 2005 (age 21)	1.81 m (5 ft 11 in)

Head coach

- (Australia) Dylan Nexhip

Assistant coach

- (England) Jo Harten

Notes

- (c) – Captain
- (cc) – Co-captain
- (vc) – Vice-captain
- – Injury / maternity leave
- (TRP) – Temporary Replacement Player
Player profiles: Team website
Last updated: 23 October 2026

=== Internationals ===
Australia

- Erin Bell
- April Brandley
- Rebecca Bulley
- Ashleigh Brazill
- Julie Corletto
- Catherine Cox
- Liz Ellis
- Rudi Ellis
- Sophie Garbin
- Matilda Garrett
- Mo'onia Gerrard
- Selina Gilsenan
- Kimberlee Green
- Paige Hadley
- Sarah Klau
- Sharni Layton
- Susan Pratley
- Maddy Proud
- Caitlin Thwaites
- Gretel Tippett
- Maddy Turner
- Stephanie Wood

Australia Fast5

- Carla Dziwoki
- Sophie Garbin
- Maddy Proud
- Maddy Turner
- Vanessa Ware
- Amorette Wild

England

- Jade Clarke
- Helen Housby
- Natalie Metcalf
- Sonia Mkoloma

Jamaica

- Romelda Aiken-George

New Zealand

- Kayla Johnson
- Laura Langman
- Grace Nweke
- Katrina Rore
- Courtney Tairi

Trinidad and Tobago

- Samantha Wallace

Uganda

- Mary Cholhok

=== Captains ===
	Years
Catherine Cox	2008–2011
Kimberlee Green	2012–2013 (co-captain); 2014-2016 (sole captain)
Mo'onia Gerrard	2012–2013 (co-captain)
Abbey McCulloch	2017–2018
Maddy Proud	2019-2020 (sole captain); 2021–2024 (co-captain)
Paige Hadley	2021–2025 (co-captain)
Maddy Turner	2025 (co-captain); 2026 (sole captain)

== Club Award winners ==
QBE Most Valued Player

Season	Winner
2008	Catherine Cox
2009	Catherine Cox (2)
2010	Rebecca Bulley
2011	Catherine Cox (3)
2012	Susan Pettitt
2013	Kimberlee Green
2014	Kimberlee Green (2)
2015	Caitlin Thwaites
2016	Laura Langman
2017	Maddy Proud
2018	Samantha Wallace
2019	Samantha Wallace (2)
2020	Sarah Klau
2021	Samantha Wallace (3)
2022	Maddy Proud (2)
2023	Helen Housby
2024	Helen Housby (2)
2025	Grace Nweke
2026	Grace Whyte

Players' Player of the Year

Season	Player
2008	Emma Koster
2009	Kimberley Smith
2010	Kimberlee Green
2011	Kimberley Smith
2012	April Letton
2013	Sonia Mkoloma
2014	Sharni Layton
2015	Sharni Layton
2016	Amy Sommerville
2017	Claire O’Brien
2018	Abbey McCulloch
2019	Sophie Garbin/Maddy Turner
2020	Sophie Garbin
2021	Maddy Turner
2022	Maddy Proud
2023	Maddy Turner
2024	Maddy Turner
2025	Grace Nweke
2026	Tayla Fraser

Coaches' Award

Season	Player
2013	Paige Hadley
2014	Sarah Wall
2015	Susan Pettitt
2016	Paige Hadley & Stephanie Wood
2017	Maddy Turner
2018	Maddy Turner
2019	Paige Hadley
2020	Samantha Wallace & Paige Hadley
2021	Sarah Klau
2022	Maddy Turner & Paige Hadley
2023	Maddy Turner & Sarah Klau
2024	Paige Hadley & Sarah Klau
2025	Sophie Fawns & Teigan O'Shannassy
2026	Maddy Proud

Members' Player of the Year

Season	Player
2008	Catherine Cox
2009	Susan Pratley
2010	Rebecca Bulley
2011	Kimberlee Green
2012	Kimberlee Green
2013	Kimberlee Green
2014	Kimberlee Green
2015	Sharni Layton
2016	Sharni Layton
2017	Maddy Proud
2018	Sarah Klau
2019	Paige Hadley
2020	Paige Hadley
2021	Sarah Klau
2022	Maddy Proud
2023	Helen Housby
2024	Paige Hadley
2025	Paige Hadley
2026	Grace Whyte

== Competition Award winners ==
ANZ Championship MVP

Season	Player
2014	Kimberlee Green (joint winner)

ANZ Championship Australian Player of the Year

Season	Player
2008	Catherine Cox
2015	Sharni Layton
2016	Sharni Layton

ANZ Championship Grand Final / Finals Series MVP

Season	Player
2008 (Grand Final MVP)	Catherine Cox
2015 (Finals Series MVP)	Sharni Layton

Super Netball Grand Final MVP

Season	Player
2019	Samantha Wallace
2021	Maddy Turner

ANZ Championship All Star Team

Season	Player	Position
2014	Susan Pratley	GA
2014	Kim Green	C
2015	Susan Pettitt	GA
2015	Kim Green	WA
2015	Julie Corletto	GD
2015	Sharni Layton	GK
2016	Susan Pettitt	GA
2016	Kim Green	WA
2016	Laura Langman	WD
2016	Sharni Layton	GK
2016	Robert Wright	Coach

Super Netball Team of the Year

Season	Player	Position
2019	Samantha Wallace	Reserve
2020	Paige Hadley	Reserve
2021	Samantha Wallace	Reserve
2022	Maddy Proud	C
2023	Helen Housby	GA
2023	Paige Hadley	WA
2025	Paige Hadley	C
2025	Teigan O'Shannassy	GK
2025	Grace Nweke	Reserve

== Head coaches ==
Coach	Years
Julie Fitzgerald	2008–2011
Lisa Beehag	2012–2013
Rob Wright	2013–2017
Briony Akle	2017–2026
Dylan Nexhip	2027-present

ANZ Championship Australian Coach of the Year

Season	Coach
2008	Julie Fitzgerald

Joyce Brown Coach of the Year

Season	Coach
2019	Briony Akle
2021	Briony Akle

== QBE Swifts Academy ==
The reserve team of the New South Wales Swifts is known as the QBE Swifts Academy, and previously played as the Netball New South Wales Waratahs. This team currently plays in the Super Netball Reserves competition, which began in 2024, after rebranding from the Australian Netball Championships and prior to that, the Australian Netball League. The team has won three premierships, the ANL in 2011, becoming the first team other than Victorian Fury to win the competition, the ANC in 2024, and SNR in 2026.

== Premierships ==
- ANZ Championship
  - Winners: 2008
  - Runners Up: 2015, 2016
  - Minor Premiership: 2010
- Super Netball
  - Winners: 2019, 2021
  - Runners Up: 2023
  - Minor Premiership: 2023
- Super Netball Reserves / Australian Netball Championships / Australian Netball League
  - Winners: 2011, 2024, 2026
  - Runners Up: 2010, 2012, 2013, 2016, 2019, 2023
