= State Sports Centre =

Multi-use indoor arena in Sydney, New South Wales

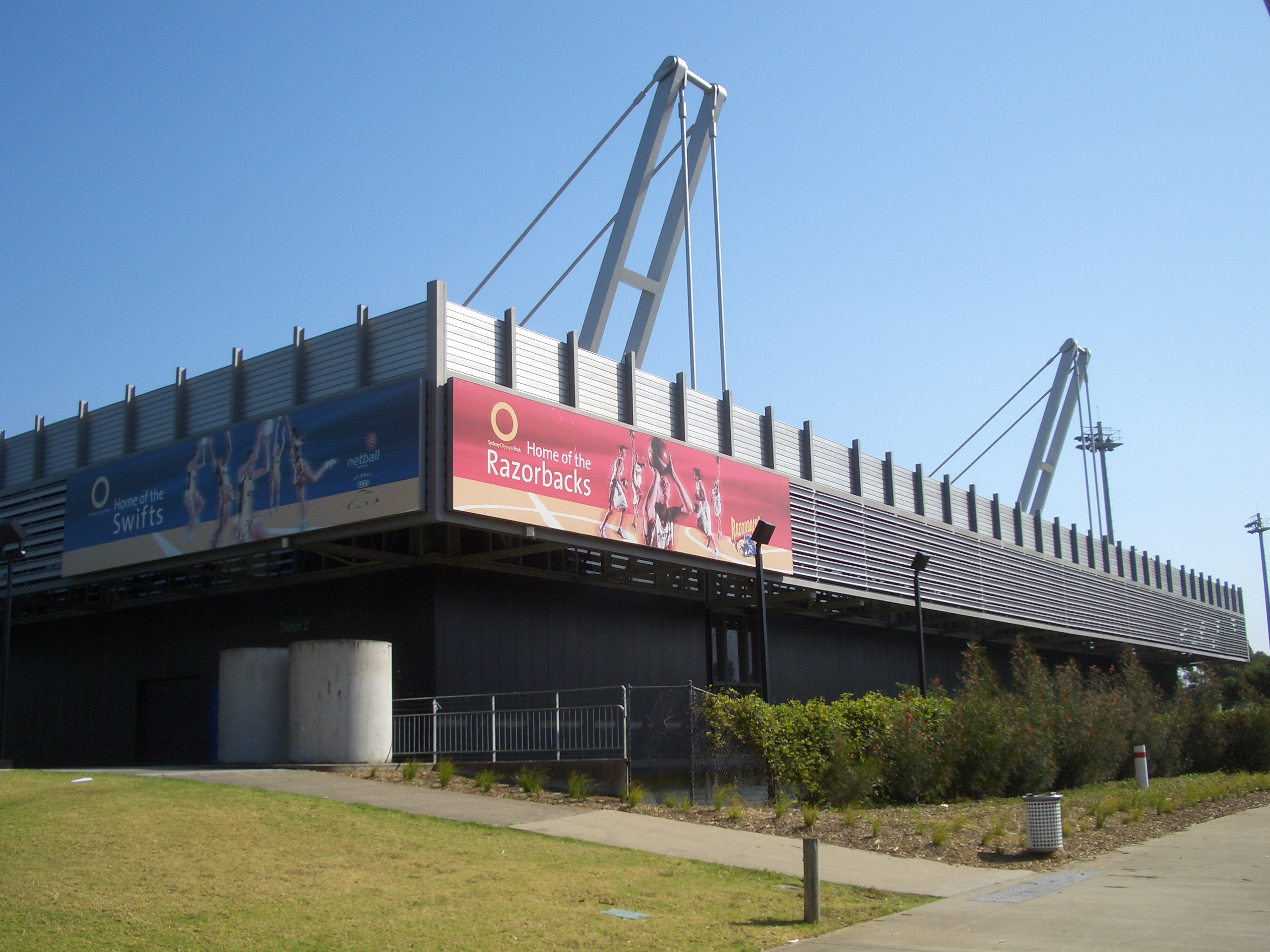
- Interactive map of State Sports Centre
- Location: Olympic Boulevard, Sydney Olympic Park, Sydney, New South Wales, Australia
- Coordinates: 33°51′12″S 151°4′10″E
- Capacity: 3,854 (expandable up to 5,006)

Construction
- Groundbreaking: 1981; 45 years ago
- Opened: November 1984; 41 years ago
- Architects: Colin Still

Tenants
- Sydney Supersonics (NBL) (1986–1987); West Sydney Westars (NBL) (1986–1987); Sydney Kings (NBL) (1988–1989, 2012, 2016); West Sydney Razorbacks/Sydney Spirit (NBL) (2000–2009); Sydney Sandpipers (CBT) (1997–2003); New South Wales Swifts (ANZ) (2008–2016) (NNL) (2017–19); Giants Netball (NNL) (2017–19)

Website
- Official website

The State Sports Centre (known commercially as the Quaycentre) is a multi-use indoor arena in Sydney, New South Wales, Australia and was opened in November 1984. With a total of 3,854 fixed and retractable seats the main arena is a focal point of the Sydney Olympic Park Sports Centre. An additional 1,152 portable seats can be accommodated on the floor level to bring seated capacity to 5,006.

== History ==
=== Basketball and netball ===
In 1986, Centre became home to Sydney's then two National Basketball League (NBL) teams, the Sydney Supersonics and West Sydney Westars. When they merged before the 1988 NBL season to form the Sydney Kings, the new team remained at the centre and would stay for two years before moving to the 12,000 seat Sydney Entertainment Centre (SEC) in 1990.

The Centre then hosted local basketball until the formation of a new NBL team in 1998 called the West Sydney Razorbacks (later renamed the Sydney Spirit). The new club called the Centre home from 1998 until the club folded in 2009.

The Sydney Sandpipers netball team called the venue home from 1997–2003 until they folded, and since 2008 it has been the home venue for the New South Wales Swifts netball team. Between 2017 and 2019, it was home to the Suncorp Super Netball team Giants Netball.

Due to a schedule conflict at the SEC, the Sydney Kings returned to the State Sports Centre for a game against defending NBL champions the New Zealand Breakers in Round 10 of the 2012–13 NBL season. The Kings defeated the Breakers 75–62 in front of 4,178 fans.

The centre was one of two venues for the 2022 FIBA Women's Basketball World Cup and the venue for the 2023 FIBA Women's Asia Cup.

=== Futsal ===
The centre hosted finals games in the Australian futsal league, with crowds higher than would have been appropriate for the usual Sydney venue of the Fairfield Leisure Centre.

=== 2000 Olympic Games ===
The State Sports Centre was one of the venues of the 2000 Summer Olympics, held in Sydney. It hosted the table tennis and taekwondo events.

=== Other ===
Hillsong's album For This Cause was recorded at the centre on 5 March 2000. C3 Church's album Send Down Your Love was also recorded at the centre during the Church's "Love Sydney" event held on 10 September 2009. In 1998, Shout to the Lord 2000 was recorded at this place as well during the 1998 Hillsong Conference.

== See also ==
- 2000 Summer Olympics venues
- List of sports venues in Australia
