= 2023 in sports (K–S) =

This page describes and summarizes the year 2023 in world sporting events for sports starting with the letters "K" through "S".

== Karate ==
=== Various karate championships ===
- February 3–5: 2023 EKF Cadet, Junior & U21 Championships in (Cyprus) Larnaca
- March 22–26: 2023 European Karate Championships in (Spain) Guadalajara
- May 5–7: 2023 Mediterranean Karate Championships in (Tunisia) Tunis
- May 26–28: 2023 Pan American Karate Championships in (Costa Rica) San José
- August 25–27: 2023 PKF Cadet, Junior & U21 Championships in (Chile) Santiago
- October 24–29: 2023 World Karate Championships in (Hungary) Budapest
- TBA: 2023 African Karate Championships in (Ghana) Accra
- TBA: 2023 Asian Karate Championships (location TBA)

=== Karate 1–Premier League ===
- January 27–29: K1PL #1 in (Egypt) Cairo
  - Men's −60 kg winner: (Kazakhstan) Kaisar Alpysbay
  - Men's −67 kg winner: (France) Steven Da Costa
  - Men's −75 kg winner: (Egypt) Abdalla Hesham Abdelgawad
  - Men's −84 kg winner: (Ukraine) Valerii Chobotar
  - Men's +84 kg winner: (Egypt) Taha Mahmoud
  - Women's −50 kg winner: (Egypt) Reem Ahmed Salama
  - Women's −55 kg winner: (Ukraine) Anna Protsenko
  - Women's −61 kg winner: (Ukraine) Oleksandra Sholohova
  - Women's −68 kg winner: (Switzerland) Elena Quirici
  - Women's +68 kg winner: (Japan) Ayumi Uekusa
  - Kata winners: (Spain) Damián Quintero (m) / (Japan) Kiyou Shimizu (f)
- May 12–14: K1PL #2 in (Morocco) Rabat
  - Men's −60 kg winner: (Italy) Angelo Crescenzo
  - Men's −67 kg winner: (Jordan) Abdelrahman Al-Masatfa
  - Men's −75 kg winner: (Belgium) Quentin Mahauden
  - Men's −84 kg winner: (Jordan) Mohammad Al-Jafari
  - Men's +84 kg winner: (Italy) Matteo Avanzini
  - Women's −50 kg winner: (Venezuela) Yorgelis Salazar
  - Women's −55 kg winner: (Ukraine) Anzhelika Terliuga
  - Women's −61 kg winner: (Tunisia) Wafa Mahjoub
  - Women's −68 kg winner: (Azerbaijan) Irina Zaretska
  - Women's +68 kg winner: (Japan) Ayumi Uekusa
  - Kata winners: (Japan) Kakeru Nishiyama (m) / (Japan) Kiyou Shimizu (f)
- June 9–11: K1PL #3 in (Japan) Fukuoka
  - Men's −60 kg winner: (Japan) Hiromu Hashimoto
  - Men's −67 kg winner: (Jordan) Abdelrahman Al-Masatfa
  - Men's −75 kg winner: (Italy) Lorenzo Pietromarchi
  - Men's −84 kg winner: (Jordan) Mohammad Al-Jafari
  - Men's +84 kg winner: (Ukraine) Ryzvan Talibov
  - Women's −50 kg winner: (Egypt) Reem Ahmed Salama
  - Women's −55 kg winner: (Ukraine) Anzhelika Terliuga
  - Women's −61 kg winner: (Japan) Sarara Shimada
  - Women's −68 kg winner: (Switzerland) Elena Quirici
  - Women's +68 kg winner: (Japan) Yuzuki Sawae
  - Kata winners: (Japan) Kazumasa Moto (m) / (Japan) Hikaru Ono (f)
- September 8–10: K1PL #4 (final) in (Republic of Ireland) Dublin
  - Men's −60 kg winner: (Japan) Hiromu Hashimoto
  - Men's −67 kg winner: (Japan) Yugo Kozaki
  - Men's −75 kg winner: (Jordan) Hasan Masarweh
  - Men's −84 kg winner: (Italy) Michele Martina
  - Men's +84 kg winner: (Ukraine) Ryzvan Talibov
  - Women's −50 kg winner: (Venezuela) Yorgelis Salazar
  - Women's −55 kg winner: (Ukraine) Anzhelika Terliuga
  - Women's −61 kg winner: (Japan) Sarara Shimada
  - Women's −68 kg winner: (Azerbaijan) Irina Zaretska
  - Women's +68 kg winner: (Japan) Ayaka Saito
  - Kata winners: (Japan) Kakeru Nishiyama (m) / (Japan) Hikaru Ono (f)

=== Karate 1–Series A ===
- January 13–15: K1SA #1 in (Greece) Athens
  - Men's Kumite:
    - 60 kg winner: (Japan) Hiromu Hashimoto
    - 67 kg winner: (Japan) Yugo Kozaki
    - 75 kg winner: (Morocco) Abdelkarim Asaas
    - 84 kg winner: (Japan) Junya Eto
    - +84 kg winner: (Bosnia and Herzegovina) Anes Bostandžić
  - Women's Kumite
    - 50 kg winner: (Portugal) Catarina Rodrigues
    - 55 kg winner: (Italy) Syria Mancinelli
    - 61 kg winner: (Greece) Konstantina Chrysopoulou
    - 68 kg winner: (Japan) Tsubasa Kama
    - +68 kg winner: (Greece) Kyriaki Kydonaki
  - Kata
    - Individual Kata winners: (Japan) Aoi Funada (m) / (Japan) Mirisa Ohuchi (f)
    - Team Kata winners: Kuwait (m) / Spain (f)
- March 10–12: K1SA #2 in Konya
  - Men's Kumite:
    - 60 kg winner: (Italy) Carmine Luciano
    - 67 kg winner: (Turkey) Enes Fatih Kurt
    - 75 kg winner: (Turkey) Eren Akkurt
    - 84 kg winner: (Iran) Alireza Akbari
    - +84 kg winner: (Saudi Arabia) Sanad Sufyani
  - Women's Kumite
    - 50 kg winner: (El Salvador) Gabriella Izaguirre
    - 55 kg winner: (Kazakhstan) Bella Samasheva
    - 61 kg winner: (Turkey) Gülbahar Gözütok
    - 68 kg winner: (Kazakhstan) Laura Alikul
    - +68 kg winner: (Iran) Shima Alesaadi
  - Kata
    - Individual Kata winners: (Japan) Ryonosuke Kikuchi (m) / (Japan) Mirisa Ohuchi (f)
    - Team Kata winners: Spain (m) / Turkey (f)
- April 14–16: K1SA #3 in (Canada) Richmond
  - Men's Kumite:
    - 60 kg winner: (Japan) Hiromu Hashimoto
    - 67 kg winner: (Iran) Morteza Nemati
    - 75 kg winner: (Algeria) Oussama Zaid
    - 84 kg winner: (Algeria) Falleh Midouni
    - +84 kg winner: (Greece) Athanasios Nikopoulos
  - Women's Kumite
    - 50 kg winner: (Croatia) Ema Sgardelli
    - 55 kg winner: (Canada) Hana Furumoto-Deshaies
    - 61 kg winner: (Mexico) Ericka Luque
    - 68 kg winner: (Japan) Ayumi Yatoji
    - +68 kg winner: (Japan) Yuzuki Sawae
  - Kata
    - Individual Kata winners: (United States) Rey Chinen (m) / (Japan) Nakaji Hisami (f)
    - Team Kata winners: Kuwait (m) / Hong Kong (f)
- September 29 – October 1: K1SA #4 in (Cyprus) Larnaca
  - Men's Kumite:
    - 60 kg winner: (France) Rayyan Meziane
    - 67 kg winner: (Georgia (country)) Ika Sulamanidze
    - 75 kg winner: (Ukraine) Heorhii Pitsul
    - 84 kg winner: (Slovakia) Adi Gyurík
    - +84 kg winner: (Iran) Mahmoud Nemati
  - Women's Kumite
    - 50 kg winner: (Colombia) Sofia Cardenas Balcazar
    - 55 kg winner: (Bulgaria) Ivet Goranova
    - 61 kg winner: (Serbia) Mina Trikos
    - 68 kg winner: (France) Melina Marmot
    - +68 kg winner: (Poland) Julia Daniszewska
  - Kata
    - Individual Kata winners: (Italy) Alessio Ghinami (m) / (Japan) Mishima Kiri (f)
    - Team Kata winners: Egypt (m) / Egypt (f)
- November 24–26: K1SA #5 (final) in (Portugal) Matosinhos
  - Men's Kumite:
    - 60 kg winner: (Georgia (country)) David Tkebuchava
    - 67 kg winner: (Portugal) Joaquim Mendes
    - 75 kg winner: (France) Enzo Berthon
    - 84 kg winner: (Turkey) Hasan Arslan
    - +84 kg winner: (Iran) Saleh Abazari
  - Women's Kumite
    - 50 kg winner: (Slovakia) Natália Vargová
    - 55 kg winner: (Germany) Mia Bitsch
    - 61 kg winner: (Spain) Indira Zúñiga García
    - 68 kg winner: (France) Thalya Sombe
    - +68 kg winner: (Germany) Amelie Lücke
  - Kata
    - Individual Kata winners: (United States) Rey Chinen (m) / (Japan) Mishima Kiri (f)
    - Team Kata winners: Japan (m) / Spain (f)

=== Karate 1–Youth League ===
- February 24–26: K1YL #1 in (United Arab Emirates) Fujairah
- April 28–30: K1YL #2 in (Spain) A Coruña
- June 30 – July 2: K1YL #3 in (Croatia) Poreč
- September 22–24: K1YL #4 in Mexico (location TBA)
- December 8–10: K1YL #5 (final) in (Italy) Venice

== Lacrosse ==
=== National Lacrosse League ===
- December 2, 2022 — June 3, 2023: 2022 NLL season
  - MVP: Christian Del Bianco
  - NLL Cup: (New York (state)) Buffalo Bandits

== Modern pentathlon ==
World & Continental Championships

- June 14–18: 2023 European Junior Modern Pentathlon Championships in (Turkey) Istanbul
- August 21–28: 2023 World Modern Pentathlon Championships in (United Kingdom) Bath
- September 6–11: 2023 African & Oceania Modern Pentathlon Championships in (Egypt) Cairo
- September 12–17: 2023 World Junior Modern Pentathlon Championships in (Lithuania) Druskininkai
- November 9–12: 2023 South & Pan American Junior Modern Pentathlon Championships in (Argentina) Buenos Aires

Modern Pentathlon World Cup

- March 7–12: MPWC #1 in (Egypt) Cairo
  - Winners: (Egypt) Ahmed El-Gendy (m) / (Hungary) Michelle Gulyás (f)
  - Mixed Relay winners: (Lithuania) Titas Puronas & Gintarė Venčkauskaitė
- April 11–16: MPWC #2 in (Turkey) Ankara #1
  - Winners: (Egypt) Mohanad Shaban (m) / (Lithuania) Ieva Serapinaitė (f)
  - Mixed Relay winners: (Turkey) Buğra Ünal & İlke Özyüksel
- April 25–30: MPWC #3 in (Hungary) Budapest
  - Winners: (South Korea) Jun Woong-tae (m) / (Hungary) Blanka Guzi (f)
  - Mixed Relay winners: (South Korea) Seo Chang-wan & Kim Sun-woo
- May 9–14: MPWC #4 in (Bulgaria) Sofia
  - Winners: (France) Valentin Prades (m) / (United Kingdom) Kerenza Bryson (f)
  - Mixed Relay winners: (United Kingdom) Charles Brown & Kerenza Bryson
- May 31 – June 4: MPWC #5 (final) in (Turkey) Ankara #2
  - Winners: (Egypt) Mohanad Shaban (m) / (Italy) Elena Micheli (f)
  - Mixed Relay winners: (South Korea) Jun Woong-tae & Kim Sun-woo

== Motorsports ==
=== 2023 Formula One World Championship ===
- March 5: 2023 Bahrain Grand Prix in Sakhir
  - Winner: (Netherlands) Max Verstappen (Oracle Red Bull Racing)
- March 19: 2023 Saudi Arabian Grand Prix in (Saudi Arabia) Jeddah
  - Winner: (Mexico) Sergio Pérez (Oracle Red Bull Racing)
- April 2: 2023 Australian Grand Prix in (Australia) Melbourne
  - Winner: (Netherlands) Max Verstappen (Oracle Red Bull Racing)
- April 30: 2023 Azerbaijan Grand Prix in Baku
  - Winner: (Mexico) Sergio Pérez (Oracle Red Bull Racing)
- May 7: 2023 Miami Grand Prix in (United States) Miami Gardens, Florida
  - Winner: (Netherlands) Max Verstappen (Oracle Red Bull Racing)
- May 21: 2023 Emilia Romagna Grand Prix in (Italy) Imola
  - Cancelled
- May 28: 2023 Monaco Grand Prix in Monte Carlo
  - Winner: (Netherlands) Max Verstappen (Oracle Red Bull Racing)
- June 4: 2023 Spanish Grand Prix in (Spain) Barcelona
  - Winner: (Netherlands) Max Verstappen (Oracle Red Bull Racing)
- June 18: 2023 Canadian Grand Prix in (Canada) Montreal
  - Winner: (Netherlands) Max Verstappen (Oracle Red Bull Racing)
- July 2: 2023 Austrian Grand Prix in (Austria) Spielberg, Styria
  - Winner: (Netherlands) Max Verstappen (Oracle Red Bull Racing)
- July 9: 2023 British Grand Prix in (United Kingdom) Silverstone
  - Winner: (Netherlands) Max Verstappen (Oracle Red Bull Racing)
- July 23: 2023 Hungarian Grand Prix in (Hungary) Budapest
  - Winner: (Netherlands) Max Verstappen (Oracle Red Bull Racing)
- July 30: 2023 Belgian Grand Prix in (Belgium) Stavelot
  - Winner: (Netherlands) Max Verstappen (Oracle Red Bull Racing)
- August 27: 2023 Dutch Grand Prix in (Netherlands) Zandvoort
  - Winner: (Netherlands) Max Verstappen (Oracle Red Bull Racing)
- September 3: 2023 Italian Grand Prix in (Italy) Monza
  - Winner: (Netherlands) Max Verstappen (Oracle Red Bull Racing)
- September 17: 2023 Singapore Grand Prix in Marina Bay, Singapore
  - Winner: (Spain) Carlos Sainz Jr. (Scuderia Ferrari)
- September 24: 2023 Japanese Grand Prix in (Japan) Suzuka, Mie
  - Winner: (Netherlands) Max Verstappen (Oracle Red Bull Racing)
- October 8: 2023 Qatar Grand Prix in Lusail
  - Winner: (Netherlands) Max Verstappen (Oracle Red Bull Racing)
- October 22: 2023 United States Grand Prix in Austin, Texas
  - Winner: (Netherlands) Max Verstappen (Oracle Red Bull Racing)
- October 29: 2023 Mexico City Grand Prix in Mexico City
  - Winner: (Netherlands) Max Verstappen (Oracle Red Bull Racing)
- November 5: 2023 São Paulo Grand Prix in (Brazil) São Paulo
  - Winner: (Netherlands) Max Verstappen (Oracle Red Bull Racing)
- November 18: 2023 Las Vegas Grand Prix in (United States) Las Vegas (debut event)
  - Winner: (Netherlands) Max Verstappen (Oracle Red Bull Racing)
- November 26: 2023 Abu Dhabi Grand Prix (final) in (United Arab Emirates) Yas Island
  - Winner: (Netherlands) Max Verstappen (Oracle Red Bull Racing)

=== 2022–23 Formula E World Championship ===
- January 14: 2023 Mexico City ePrix in Mexico
  - Winner: (United Kingdom) Jake Dennis ( (United States) Andretti Autosport)
- January 27: 2023 Diriyah ePrix #1 at the (Saudi Arabia) Riyadh Street Circuit
  - Winner: (Germany) Pascal Wehrlein ( (Germany) Tag Heuer Porsche Formula E Team)
- January 28: 2023 Diriyah ePrix #2 at the (Saudi Arabia) Riyadh Street Circuit
  - Winner: (Germany) Pascal Wehrlein ( (Germany) Tag Heuer Porsche Formula E Team)
- February 11: 2023 Hyderabad ePrix in India (debut event)
  - Winner: (France) Jean-Éric Vergne ( (United States) DS Penske)
- February 25: 2023 Cape Town ePrix in South Africa (debut event)
  - Winner: (Portugal) António Félix da Costa ( (Germany) Tag Heuer Porsche Formula E Team)
- March 25: 2023 São Paulo ePrix in Brazil
  - Winner: (New Zealand) Mitch Evans ( (United Kingdom) Jaguar TCS Racing)
- April 22: 2023 Berlin ePrix #1 at the (Germany) Tempelhof Airport Street Circuit
  - Winner: (New Zealand) Mitch Evans ( (United Kingdom) Jaguar TCS Racing)
- April 23: 2023 Berlin ePrix #2 at the (Germany) Tempelhof Airport Street Circuit
  - Winner: (New Zealand) Nick Cassidy ( (United Kingdom) Envision Racing)
- May 6: 2023 Monaco ePrix in Monte Carlo
  - Winner: (New Zealand) Nick Cassidy ( (United Kingdom) Envision Racing)
- June 3: 2023 Jakarta ePrix #1 in (Indonesia) Ancol
  - Winner: (Germany) Pascal Wehrlein ( (Germany) Tag Heuer Porsche Formula E Team)
- June 4: 2023 Jakarta ePrix #2 in (Indonesia) Ancol
  - Winner: (Germany) Maximilian Günther ( (Monaco) Maserati MSG Racing)
- June 24: 2023 Portland ePrix in (United States) Portland International Raceway (debut event)
  - Winner: (New Zealand) Nick Cassidy ( (United Kingdom) Envision Racing)
- July 15: 2023 Rome ePrix #1 in Italy
  - Winner: (New Zealand) Mitch Evans ( (United Kingdom) Jaguar TCS Racing)
- July 16: 2023 Rome ePrix #2 in Italy
  - Winner: (United Kingdom) Jake Dennis ( (United States) Andretti Autosport)
- July 29: 2023 London ePrix #1 (final) at the (United Kingdom) ExCeL London Circuit
  - Winner: (New Zealand) Mitch Evans ( (United Kingdom) Jaguar TCS Racing)
- July 30: 2023 London ePrix #2 (final) at the (United Kingdom) ExCeL London Circuit
  - Winner: (New Zealand) Nick Cassidy ( (United Kingdom) Envision Racing)

=== 2023 World Rally Championship ===
- January 19–22: (Monaco) 2023 Monte Carlo Rally
  - WRC: (France) Sébastien Ogier ( (Japan) Toyota Gazoo Racing WRT)
  - WRC-2: (France) Yohan Rossel ( (France) PH Sport)

=== 2023 World Rally-Raid Championship ===
- December 31, 2022 – January 15: (Saudi Arabia) 2023 Dakar Rally
  - Bikes: (Argentina) Kevin Benavides (Red Bull KTM Factory Racing)
  - Cars: (Qatar) Nasser Al-Attiyah (Toyota Gazoo Racing)
  - Classics: (Spain) Juan Morera (Toyota Classic)
  - LW-Prototype: (United States) Austin Jones (Red Bull Off-Road JR Team USA By BFG)
  - Quads: (France) Alexandre Giroud (Yamaha Racing- SMX Drag'on)
  - SSV: (Poland) Eryk Goczał (Energylandia Rally Team)
  - Trucks: (Netherlands) Janus van Kasteren (Boss Machinery Team De Rooy Iveco)
- February 26 – March 3: (United Arab Emirates) 2023 Abu Dhabi Desert Challenge
- April 22–28: (Mexico) 2023 Sonora Rally
- August 26 – September 1: (Argentina) 2023 Desafío Ruta 40
- October 12–18: (Morocco) 2023 Rallye du Maroc (final)

=== NASCAR ===
- February 5 – November 5: 2023 NASCAR Cup Series
- February 17 – November 3: 2023 NASCAR Craftsman Truck Series
- February 18 – November 4: 2023 NASCAR Xfinity Series

=== IndyCar Series ===
- March 5 – September 10: 2023 IndyCar Series

== Mountain running ==
=== 2023 Valsir Mountain Running World Cup ===
- June 16: Broken Arrow VK in (United States) Lake Tahoe
  - Winners: (Italy) Andrea Rostan (m) / (United States) Anna Gibson (w)
- June 18: Broken Arrow Skyrace in (United States) Lake Tahoe
  - Winners: (United States) Eli Hemming (m) / (United States) Allie McLaughlin (w)
- June 25: Tatra Race Run in (Poland) Zakopane
  - Winners: (Poland) Krzysztof Bodurka (m) / (Poland) Iwona Januszyk (w)
- July 2: Montemuro Vertical Run in (Portugal) Castro Daire
  - Winners: (Canada) Alexandre Ricard (m) / (United Kingdom) Scout Adkin (w)
- July 15: Piz Tri Vertical in (Italy) Malonno
  - Winners: (Kenya) Patrick Kipngeno (m) / (Austria) Andrea Mayr (w)
- July 16: Fletta Trail in (Italy) Malonno
  - Winners: (Kenya) Philemon Kiriago (m) / (Kenya) Joyce Muthoni Njeru (w)
- July 22: La Montee Du Nid D'Aigle in (France) Saint-Gervais-les-Bains
  - Winners: (Kenya) Patrick Kipngeno (m) / (Kenya) Joyce Muthoni Njeru (w)
- August 12: Sierre-Zinal in (Switzerland) Zinal
  - Winners: (Kenya) Philemon Kiriago (m) / (United States) Sophia Laukli (w)
- September 2: Vertical Nasego in (Italy) Casto
  - Winners: (Kenya) Patrick Kipngeno (m) / (Austria) Andrea Mayr (w)
- September 3: Trofeo Nasego in (Italy) Casto
  - Winners: (Kenya) Philemon Kiriago (m) / (Austria) Andrea Mayr (w)
- September 8: Canfranc-Canfranc in (Spain) Canfranc
  - Winners: (United Kingdom) Joe Steward (m) / (Kenya) Joyce Muthoni Njeru (w)
- September 10: Canfranc-Canfranc in (Spain) Canfranc
  - Winners: (Morocco) Adil Moussaoui (m) / (Kenya) Joyce Muthoni Njeru (w)
- September 30: Primiero Dolomiti Trail in (Italy) Primiero
  - Winners: (Italy) Xavier Chevrier (m) / (Finland) Susanna Saapunki (w)
- October 7: Šmarna Gora Race in (Slovenia) Ljubljana
  - Winners: (Italy) Isacco Costa (m) / (Finland) Susanna Saapunki (w)
- October 13: Sky Gran Canaria in (Spain) Agaete
  - Winners: (United Kingdom) Joe Steward (m) / (United Kingdom) Scout Adkin (w)
- October 14: Sky Gran Canaria in (Spain) Agaete
  - Winners: (United States) Christian Allen (m) / (Spain) Rharsalla Laktab Ikram (w)
- October 15: Sky Gran Canaria in (Spain) Agaete
  - Winners: (Kenya) Philemon Kiriago (m) / (Kenya) Joyce Muthoni Njeru (w)
- Overall Winners: (Kenya) Philemon Kiriago (m) / (Kenya) Joyce Muthoni Njeru (w)

== Netball ==
International tournaments

Date	Tournament	Winners	Runners up
11–15 January	2023 England Jamaica netball series	England	Jamaica
21–25 January	2023 Netball Quad Series	Australia	New Zealand
3–7 July	2023 Central American and Caribbean Games	Jamaica	Trinidad and Tobago
28 Jul–6 Aug	2023 Netball World Cup	Australia	England
8–10 August	2023 Commonwealth Youth Games	Australia	South Africa
24–30 September	2023 Taini Jamison Trophy Series	New Zealand	England
29 September–7 October	2023 ECCB International Netball Series	Grenada	Saint Vincent and the Grenadines
12–23 October	2023 Constellation Cup	Australia	New Zealand
11–12 November	2023 Fast5 Netball World Series	Australia	New Zealand
11–12 November	2023 Men's Fast5 Netball World Series	New Zealand	Australia
27 Nov–2 Dec	2023 Pacific Games	Tonga	Fiji
28 Nov–6 Dec	2023 Men's Africa Netball Cup	South Africa	Zimbabwe

Major national leagues

Host	League	Winners	Runners up
Australia	Suncorp Super Netball	Adelaide Thunderbirds	New South Wales Swifts
New Zealand	ANZ Premiership	Northern Mystics	Northern Stars
United Kingdom	Netball Superleague	Loughborough Lightning	London Pulse

== Orienteering ==
=== World Championships ===
- July 11–16: 2023 World Orienteering Championships in Flims/Laax
  - Middle winners: (Switzerland) Matthias Kyburz (m) / (Sweden) Tove Alexandersson (f)
  - Long winners: (Norway) Kasper Harlem Fosser (m) / (Switzerland) Simona Aebersold (f)
  - Relay winners: Switzerland (m) / Sweden (f)

=== 2023 Orienteering World Cup ===
- April 26–30: World Cup #1 in (Norway) Østfold
  - Long winners: (Norway) Kasper Harlem Fosser (m) / (Sweden) Tove Alexandersson (f)
  - Middle winners: (Norway) Kasper Harlem Fosser (m) / (Sweden) Sara Hagström (f)
  - Relay winners: Sweden (m) / Sweden (f)
- August 2–6: World Cup #2 in (Czech Republic) Česká Lípa
  - Sprint winners: (United Kingdom) Ralph Street (m) / (Sweden) Tove Alexandersson (f)
  - Middle winners: (Austria) Jannis Bonek (m) / (Sweden) Tove Alexandersson (f)
  - Long winners: (Norway) Kasper Harlem Fosser (m) / (Sweden) Tove Alexandersson (f)
  - Sprint relay winners: Switzerland
- October 4–8: World Cup #3 in (Italy) Verona
  - Sprint winners: (Switzerland) Matthias Kyburz (m) / (Sweden) Sara Hagström (f)
  - Knock-Out sprint winners: (Switzerland) Matthias Kyburz (m) / (Sweden) Tove Alexandersson (f)
  - Sprint relay winners: Sweden
- Overall winners: (Switzerland) Matthias Kyburz (m) / (Sweden) Tove Alexandersson (f)
- Team Overall winners: Sweden

== Racquetball ==
=== 2022–23 International Racquetball Tour ===
Grand Slam

- September 28 – October 2, 2022: US Open Racquetball Championships in (United States) Minneapolis
  - Singles: (Bolivia) Conrrado Moscoso defeated (Mexico) Rodrigo Montoya, 15–8, 15–4.
  - Doubles: (Mexico) Álvaro Beltrán & (Mexico) Daniel de la Rosa defeated (United States) Sam Bredenbeck & (United States) Jake Bredenbeck, 14–15, 15–10, 11–4.

Tier 1

- September 15–18, 2022: Capitol Classic Racquetball Tournament in (United States) Millersville
  - Singles: (Mexico) Eduardo Portillo Torres defeated (Mexico) Javier Mar, 15–7, 15–3.
- October 6–9, 2022: Golden State Open 2022 in (United States) Pleasanton
  - Singles: (Bolivia) Conrrado Moscoso defeated (United States) Jake Bredenbeck, 15–11, 15–7.
- November 3–6, 2022: Dovetail Open in (United States) Sarasota
  - Singles: (Mexico) Daniel de la Rosa defeated (Mexico) Rodrigo Montoya, 15–5, 15–3.
- December 1–4, 2022: Tournament of Champions 2022 in (United States) Portland
  - Singles: (United States) Jake Bredenbeck defeated (Mexico) Eduardo Portillo Torres, 15–14, 8–15, 11–7.
- January 6–8: 2023 Longhorn Open in (United States) Austin
- January 19–22: Lewis Drug Pro-Am in (United States) Sioux Falls
- February 16–19: Suivant Consulting Pro-Am in (United States) Lilburn
- March 1–3: Minnesota Hall of Fame in (United States) Fridley
- March 16–19: Papa Nicholas Shootout in (United States) Lombard
- April 20–23: SoCal Open in (United States) Fullerton
- April 27–30: Baja California Open in (Mexico) Tijuana

Satellite

- November 16–19, 2022: Monterrey International Open in (Mexico) Monterrey
  - Singles: (Mexico) Andree Parrilla defeated (Mexico) Jordy Alonso, 15–6, 15–5.

Outdoor

- October 26 – November 4, 2022: 3WallBall Outdoor World Championships in (United States) Las Vegas
  - Singles: (Bolivia) Conrrado Moscoso defeated (Costa Rica) Andrés Acuña, 15–11, 14–15, 11–4.
  - Doubles: (Mexico) Eduardo Portillo Torres & (United States) Rocky Carson defeated (United States) Adam Manilla & (United States) Nicholas Riffel, 15–8, 15–3.
  - Mixed doubles: (Mexico) Daniel de la Rosa & (United States) Michelle de La Rosa defeated (Colombia) Mario Mercado & (Colombia) Brenda Laime, 12–15, 15–14, 11–3.

=== 2022–23 Ladies Professional Racquetball Tour ===
Grand Slam

- August 12–17, 2022: Paola Longoria Experience in (Mexico) Aguascalientes
  - Singles: (Mexico) Paola Longoria defeated (Mexico) Montserrat Mejía, 15–12, 11–15, 11–10.
  - Doubles: (Mexico) Alexandra Herrera & (Mexico) Montserrat Mejía defeated (Mexico) Samantha Salas & (Mexico) Paola Longoria, 15–7, 15–7.
- September 28 – October 2, 2022: US Open Racquetball Championships in (United States) Minneapolis
  - Singles: (Mexico) Paola Longoria defeated (United States) Erika Manilla, 13–15, 15–5, 11–3.
  - Doubles: (United States) Erika Manilla & (Argentina) Natalia Méndez defeated (Mexico) Samantha Salas & (Mexico) Paola Longoria, 15–14, 7–15, 11–4.

Tier 1

- September 8 – October 1, 2022: LPRT at the Beach in (United States) Chesapeake
  - Singles: (Mexico) Alexandra Herrera defeated (Colombia) Brenda Laime, 15–7, 15–12.
  - Doubles: (United States) Hollie Scott & (United States) Kelani Lawrence defeated (Mexico) Paola Longoria & (Argentina) Valeria Centellas, 15–1, 15–12.
- November 18–22, 2022: LPRT Pro Am Turkey Shoot in (United States) Chicago
  - Singles: (Mexico) Montserrat Mejía defeated (Mexico) Alexandra Herrera, 2–15, 15–12, 11–5.
  - Doubles: (Mexico) Alexandra Herrera & (Mexico) Samantha Salas defeated (United States) Erika Manilla & (Argentina) Natalia Méndez, 15–13, 15–14.
- December 9–11, 2022: 30th Annual Christmas Classic in (United States) Severna Park
  - Singles: (Mexico) Montserrat Mejía defeated (Mexico) Paola Longoria, 15–8, 15–7.
  - Doubles: (Mexico) Samantha Salas & (Mexico) Alexandra Herrera defeated (Mexico) Montserrat Mejía & (Mexico) Paola Longoria, 15–0, 13–15, 11–7.
- February 16–18: RPAA Presents 2023 Arizona State Doubles with LPRT Pro Stop in (United States) Tempe
- March 3–5: The Boston Open in (United States) Boston
- April 27–29: Battle at the Alamo in (United States) San Antonio

Outdoor

- October 26 – November 4, 2022: 3WallBall Outdoor World Championships in (United States) Las Vegas
  - Singles: (Chile) Carla Muñoz defeated (United States) Janel Tisinger-Ledkins, 12–15, 15–10, 11–8.
  - Doubles: (United States) Michelle de La Rosa & (United States) Janel Tisinger-Ledkins defeated (Colombia) Brenda Laime & (Mexico) Alexandra Herrera, 15–2, 15–11.
  - Mixed doubles: (Mexico) Daniel de la Rosa & (United States) Michelle de La Rosa defeated (Colombia) Mario Mercado & (Colombia) Brenda Laime, 12–15, 15–14, 11–3.
- March 10–12: Beach Bash in (United States) Hollywood

== Rowing ==
World & Continental Championships

- January 28 & 29: 2023 European Rowing Indoor Championships in (France) Paris
- February 25 & 26: 2023 World Rowing Indoor Championships in (Canada) Toronto
- May 20 & 21: 2023 European Rowing Under 19 Championships in (France) Brive-la-Gaillarde
- May 25–28: 2023 European Rowing Championships in (Slovenia) Bled
- July 13–15: 2023 World University Rowing Championships in (Canada) London
- July 19–23: 2023 World Rowing U23 Championships in (Bulgaria) Plovdiv
- August 2–6: 2023 World Rowing Junior Championships in (France) Paris
- August 26 & 27: 2023 European Rowing U23 Championships in (Germany) Krefeld
- September 3–10: 2023 World Rowing Championships in (Serbia) Belgrade

2023 World Rowing Cup

- May 5–7: WRC #1 in (Croatia) Zagreb
- June 16–18: WRC #2 in (Italy) Varese
- July 7–9: WRC #3 (final) in (Switzerland) Lucerne

== Rugby union ==
=== Rugby World Cup ===
- September 8 – October 28: 2023 Rugby World Cup in France

=== 2022–23 World Rugby Sevens Series ===
- November 4–6, 2022: WRSS #1 in Hong Kong Stadium #1 (Men only)
  - Australia defeated Fiji, 20–17, in the final. France took third place.
- December 2 & 3, 2022: WRSS #2 in (United Arab Emirates) Dubai (Men & Women)
  - Men: South Africa defeated Ireland, 21–5, in the final. New Zealand took third place.
  - Women: Australia defeated New Zealand, 26–19, in the final. The United States took third place.
- December 9–11, 2022: WRSS #3 in (South Africa) Cape Town (Men & Women)
  - Men: Samoa defeated New Zealand, 12–7, in the final. The United States took third place.
  - Women: New Zealand defeated Australia, 31–14, in the final. The United States took third place.
- January 21 & 22: WRSS #4 in Hamilton (Men & Women)
  - Men: Argentina defeated New Zealand, 14–12, in the final. The United States took third place.
  - Women: New Zealand defeated the United States, 33–7, in the final. Australia took third place.
- January 27–29: WRSS #5 in (Australia) Sydney (Men & Women)
- February 25 & 26: WRSS #6 in (United States) Los Angeles (Men only)
- March 3–5: WRSS #7 in (Canada) Vancouver (Men & Women)
- March 31 – April 2: WRSS #8 in Hong Kong Stadium #2 (Men & Women)
- April 8 & 9: WRSS #9 in Singapore (Men only)
- May 12–14: WRSS #10 in (France) Toulouse (Men & Women's Final)
- May 20 & 21: WRSS #11 in (United Kingdom) London (Men's Final)

=== 2023 Six Nations Championship ===
- February 4 & 5: Round 1
  - Wales vs. Ireland at Millennium Stadium
  - England vs. Scotland at Twickenham Stadium
  - Italy vs. France at Stadio Olimpico

=== 2023 Women's Six Nations Championship ===
- March 25 & 26: Round 1
  - Wales vs. Ireland at Cardiff Arms Park
  - England vs. Scotland at Kingston Park
  - Italy vs. France at Stadio Sergio Lanfranchi

=== 2023 Six Nations Under 20s Championship ===
- February 3: Week 1
  - Wales vs. Ireland at Eirias Stadium
  - England vs. Scotland at Twickenham Stoop
  - Italy vs. France at Stadio Comunale di Monigo

=== WXV ===
- October 13 – November 4: 2023 WXV in New Zealand,South Africa & United Arab Emirates

== Sailing ==
=== World Championships ===
January

- December 29, 2022 – January 5: 2023 Cadet Class World Championship in (Australia) Melbourne
  - Winner: (United Kingdom) Toby Bush
- January 15–20: 2023 Contender World Championship in (Australia) Perth
  - Winner: (Australia) Mark Bulka

February

- February 19–26: 2023 Nacra 15 World Championship in (United States) Fort Lauderdale

March

- March 9–25: 2023 Flying Fifteen World Championship at Fremantle Sailing Club in (Australia) Perth
- March 24 & 25: 2023 Viper 640 Women's and Youth World Championships in (United States) New Orleans
- March 27–31: 2023 Viper 640 World Championships in (United States) New Orleans

April

- April 12–21: 2023 Etchells World Championship in (United States) Miami

May

- May 22–28: 2023 KiteFoil Masters World Championships in (Italy) Torregrande
- May 26 – June 2: 2023 Finn World Master Championship in (Greece) Kavala
- May 29 – June 3: 2023 Dragon World Championship in (Turkey) Bodrum

June

- June 11–21: 2023 Optimist World Championships at Club De Vela Ballena Alegre in (Spain) Sant Pere Pescador
- June 17–23: 2023 SB20 World Championship in (Netherlands) Scheveningen
- June 23–30: 2023 Ok Dinghy World Championship in (United Kingdom) Lyme Regis

July

- July 4–14: 2023 B14 World Championship in (Italy) Torbole
- July 7–16: Paris 2024 Test Event – Sailing in (France) Marseille
- July 8–14: 2023 Europe Class World Championships in (Denmark) Copenhagen
- July 11–15: 2023 Hobie Dragoon World Championship in (Italy) Cesenatico
- July 11–16: 2023 A's Youth Foil World Championship in (Italy) Gizzeria
- July 17–21: 2023 Hobie 14 World Championship in (Italy) Cesenatico
- July 17–23: 2023 Formula Kite Youth World Championships in (Italy) Cagliari
- July 21–30: 2023 J/22 & Formula 18 World Championship in (Germany) Travemünde
- July 22–28: 2023 Vaurien World Championship in (France) Le Havre
- July 22–30: 2023 Flying Dutchman World Championship in (Poland) Gdynia
- July 22–30: 2023 Mirror Class World Championship in (Republic of Ireland) Rosses Point
- July 24–28: 2023 Topper World Championships in (Republic of Ireland) Crosshaven
- July 27 – August 4: 2023 29er World Championship in (United Kingdom) Isle of Portland
- July 28 – August 4: 2023 Dart 18 World Championship in (United Kingdom) Bridlington
- July 31 – August 4: 2023 RS500 World Championship in (Germany) Travemünde
- July 31 – August 4: 2023 H-boat World Championship in (Italy) Malcesine–Lake Garda
- July 31 – August 5: 2023 12mR World Championship in (United States) Newport

August

- August 10–20: 2023 Sailing World Championships in (Netherlands) The Hague (main event)
- August 18–25: 2023 Shark 24 World Championship in (Canada) Niagara-on-the-Lake
- August 21–26: 2023 TP52 World Championship in (Spain) Barcelona
- August 22–26: 2023 Tempest World Championship in (United Kingdom) Portsmouth
- August 26 – September 1: 2023 Micro Class World Championship in (Poland) Gdańsk
- August 27 – September 3: 2023 470 Junior World Championships in (Lithuania) Nida
- August 28 – September 2: 2023 8 Metre World Championship in (Italy) Genoa
- August 31 – September 8: 2023 6 Metre World Championship in (United Kingdom) Cowes Castle

=== Sailing Continental Championships ===
Africa

- May 2–9: 2023 Optimist African Championship at the (Morocco) Royal Yacht Club de M'diq

North America & the Caribbean

- March 6–12: 2023 Formula Kite Pan American Championships in (Dominican Republic) Cabarete
- July 2–29: 2023 Optimist North American Championship in (Antigua and Barbuda) Antigua Yacht Club
- July 14–16: 2023 ILCA North American Championship in (United States) Long Beach

South America

- April 3–9: 2023 Snipe South American Championship in (Peru) Paracas
- April 15–22: 2023 Optimist South American Championship in (Peru) Paracas

Europe

- April 15–22: 2023 EurILCA European Championships in (Italy) Andora
- May 8–14: 2023 IQFoil European Championships in Greece (location TBA)
- May 12–14: 2023 Open Finn European Championship in (Hungary) Lake Balaton
- May 12–20: 2023 470 Open European Championships in (Italy) Sanremo
- May 22–28: 2023 Formula Kite Youth (U21) European Championships in (Italy) Oristano
- July 1–9: 2023 iQFOiL Youth & Junior European Championships in (Italy) Torbole-Lake Garda
- July 3–10: 2023 420 & 470 Junior European Championships in (Poland) Gdynia
- July 15–22: 2023 Optimist European Championship in (Greece) Thessaloniki
- July 24–29: 2023 International FJ Junior European Championship in (Slovenia) Portorož
- July 24–29: 2023 Splash European Championship in (Netherlands) IJsselmeer
- August 10–20: 2023 29er European Championship in (Sweden) Stockholm
- August 21–27: 2023 Snipe European Championship in (Italy) Gargnano
- August 25–30: 2023 Optimist European Team Racing Championship in (Netherlands) Loosdrecht

Oceania

- January 9–13: 2023 Contender Australian Championship in (Australia) Perth
  - Winner: (Australia) Mark Bulka

== Shooting sports ==
World & Continental Championships

- February 20 – March 2: 2023 Asian Shotgun Cup in Kuwait City
- March 5–15: 2023 European 10 m Events Championships in (Estonia) Tallinn
- July 14–28: 2023 ISSF Junior World Championships in (South Korea) Changwon
- August 14 – September 3: 2023 ISSF World Shooting Championships in (Azerbaijan) Baku
- September 4–20: 2023 European Shotgun Championships in (Austria) Leobersdorf
- October 22 – November 5: 2023 Asian Shooting Championships in (South Korea) Changwon
- October 30 – November 6: 2023 Oceania Shooting Championships in (Australia) Sydney

2023 ISSF World Cup

- February 17–28: Rifle/Pistol WC #1 in (Egypt) Cairo
- March 4–15: Shotgun WC #1 in (Qatar) Doha
- March 20–31: Rifle/Pistol WC #2 in (India) Bhopal
- March 25 – April 6: Shotgun WC #2 in (Cyprus) Larnaca
- June 1–12: ISSF Junior World Cup in (Germany) Suhl
- September 8–19: Rifle/Pistol WC #3 in (Brazil) Rio de Janeiro
- TBA: ISSF Grand Prix in (Turkey) Konya

== Sport climbing ==
=== World championships ===
- August 1–12: 2023 IFSC Climbing World Championships in (Switzerland) Bern

=== 2023 IFSC Climbing World Cup ===
- April 21–23: CWC #1 in (Japan) Hachiōji
  - Boulder winners: (France) Mejdi Schalck (m) / (United States) Brooke Raboutou (f)
- April 28–30: CWC #2 in (South Korea) Seoul
  - Boulder winners: (France) Mejdi Schalck (m) / (Japan) Miho Nonaka (f)
  - Speed winners: (Indonesia) Veddriq Leonardo (m) / (Poland) Aleksandra Mirosław (f)
- May 6 & 7: CWC #3 in (Indonesia) Jakarta
  - Speed winners: (Indonesia) Raharjati Nursamsa (m) / (Poland) Aleksandra Mirosław (f)
- May 19–21: CWC #4 in (United States) Salt Lake City
  - Boulder winners: (Japan) Tomoa Narasaki (m) / (United States) Natalia Grossman (f)
  - Speed winners: (Indonesia) Veddriq Leonardo (m) / (Poland) Aleksandra Mirosław (f)
- June 2–4: CWC #5 in (Czech Republic) Prague
  - Boulder winners: (South Korea) Lee Do-hyun (m) / (France) Oriane Bertone (f)
- June 9–11: CWC #6 in (Italy) Brixen
  - Boulder winners: (United Kingdom) Toby Roberts (m) / (United States) Natalia Grossman (f)
- June 14–18: CWC #7 in (Austria) Innsbruck
  - Boulder winners: (Japan) Sorato Anraku (m) / (Slovenia) Janja Garnbret (f)
  - Lead winners: (Switzerland) Sascha Lehmann (m) / (Slovenia) Janja Garnbret (f)
- June 30 – July 2: CWC #8 in (Switzerland) Villars-sur-Ollon
  - Lead winners: (Austria) Jakob Schubert (m) / (Slovenia) Janja Garnbret (f)
  - Speed winners: (China) Long Jianguo (m) / (Poland) Natalia Kałucka (f)
- July 7–9: CWC #9 in (France) Chamonix
  - Lead winners: (United Kingdom) Toby Roberts (m) / (South Korea) Jain Kim (f)
  - Speed winners: (Indonesia) Rahmad Adi Mulyono (m) / (Indonesia) Rajiah Sallsabillah (f)
- July 14 & 15: CWC #10 in (France) Briançon
  - Lead winners: (Japan) Sorato Anraku (m) / (Slovenia) Vita Lukan (f)
- September 1 & 2: CWC #11 in (Slovenia) Koper
  - Lead winners: (Japan) Sorato Anraku (m) / (Slovenia) Janja Garnbret (f)
- September 22–24: CWC #12 (final) in (China) Wujiang
  - Lead winners: (Japan) Sorato Anraku (m) / (Japan) Ai Mori (f)
  - Speed winners: (China) Peng Wu (m) / (China) Deng Lijuan (f)

== Squash ==
=== 2022–23 PSA World Tour ===
Gold

- September 6–11, 2022: South Western Women's Open in (United States) Houston
  - Women's: (Egypt) Nouran Gohar defeated (Egypt) Nour El Tayeb, 12–10, 11–5, 11–7, to win their 18th PSA title.
- October 18–23, 2022: Grasshopper Cup in (Switzerland) Zürich
  - Men's: (Egypt) Mostafa Asal defeated (Egypt) Marwan El Shorbagy, 13–11, 11–2, 11–5, to win their 9th PSA title.
  - Women's: (Egypt) Nour El Sherbini defeated (Egypt) Hania El Hammamy, 9–11, 11–9, 10–12, 11–3, 11–4, to win their 31st PSA title.
- November 15–20, 2022: Singapore Squash Open in Kallang
  - Men's: (England) Mohamed El Shorbagy defeated (Peru) Diego Elías, 11–6, 11–6, 11–8, to win their 48th PSA title.
  - Women's: (New Zealand) Joelle King defeated (Egypt) Nour El Tayeb, 11–6, 12–10, 11–4, to win their 16th PSA title.

Silver

- September 30 – October 4, 2022: Netsuite Open in (United States) San Francisco
  - Men's: (England) Mohamed El Shorbagy defeated (Egypt) Marwan El Shorbagy, 6–11, 11–9, 11–2, 11–8, to win their 46th PSA title.
  - Women's: (United States) Amanda Sobhy defeated (Egypt) Farida Mohamed, 9–11, 11–5, 11–3, 11–7, to win their 19th PSA title.
- November 8–13, 2022: New Zealand Open in Tauranga
  - Men's: (England) Mohamed El Shorbagy defeated (New Zealand) Paul Coll, 9–11, 11–8, 11–4, 11–7, to win their 47th PSA title.
  - Women's: (New Zealand) Joelle King defeated (Wales) Tesni Evans, 11–4, 11–6, 11–5, to win their 15th PSA title.

Bronze

- August 24–28, 2022: ZED Squash Open in (Egypt) Sheikh Zayed City
  - Men's: (Egypt) Youssef Soliman defeated (France) Victor Crouin, 11–8, 11–5, 11–6, to win their 9th PSA title.
  - Women's: (Egypt) Nour El Tayeb defeated (Egypt) Salma Hany, 11–7, 12–14, 11–6, 11–4, to win their 12th PSA title.
- September 12–17, 2022: Open de France in Nantes
  - Men's: (France) Victor Crouin defeated (Egypt) Marwan El Shorbagy, 11–6, 9–11, 6–11, 11–8, 12–10, to win their 17th PSA title.
  - Women's: (Belgium) Nele Gilis defeated (Belgium) Tinne Gilis, 11–9, 11–6, 11–3, to win their 8th PSA title.
- November 22–26, 2022: Malaysian Open in (Malaysia) Kuala Lumpur
  - Men's: (Egypt) Mazen Hesham defeated (Egypt) Tarek Momen, 2–11, 8–11, 11–6, 11–8, 11–5, to win their 8th PSA title.
  - Women's: (Belgium) Nele Gilis defeated (United States) Olivia Fiechter, 5–11, 11–5, 13–11, 11–9, to win their 10th PSA title.
- December 6–10, 2022: Hong Kong Football Club Open in Hong Kong
  - Men's: (Egypt) Marwan El Shorbagy defeated (Egypt) Mazen Hesham, 11–8, 5–11, 11–9, 11–8, to win their 13th PSA title.

Platinum

- September 4–10, 2022: Qatar Classic in Doha
  - Men's: (England) Mohamed El Shorbagy defeated (France) Victor Crouin, 11–4, 11–6, 7–11, 11–8, to win their 45th PSA title.
- September 19–25, 2022: Egyptian Open in (Egypt) Cairo
  - Men's: (Egypt) Ali Farag defeated (New Zealand) Paul Coll, 11–6, 8–11, 11–4, 11–7, to win their 29th PSA title.
  - Women's: (Egypt) Hania El Hammamy defeated (Egypt) Nouran Gohar, 11–7, 11–13, 11–3, 11–4, to win their 10th PSA title.
- October 8–15, 2022: US Open in (United States) Philadelphia
  - Men's: (Peru) Diego Elías defeated (Egypt) Ali Farag, 2–0, rtd., to win their, 12th PSA title.
  - Women's: (Egypt) Nouran Gohar defeated (Egypt) Nour El Sherbini, 11–7, 9–11, 11–7, 11–6, to win their 19th PSA title.
- November 28 – December 4, 2022: Hong Kong Open in Hong Kong
  - Men's: (Egypt) Mostafa Asal defeated (Peru) Diego Elías, 6–11, 6–11, 12–10, 11–9, 11–4, to win their 10th PSA title.
  - Women's: (Egypt) Hania El Hammamy defeated (Egypt) Nour El Sherbini, 15–13, 9–11, 11–3, 8–11, 11–9, to win their 11th PSA title.

== Surfing ==
ISA

- May 30 – June 7: 2023 ISA World Surfing Games in (El Salvador) Surf City
  - Men: (Mexico) Alan Cleland
  - Women: (Brazil) Tatiana Weston-Webb
- TBA: 2023 ISA World Junior Surfing Championship (location TBA)
- TBA: 2023 ISA World Para Surfing Championship (location TBA)
- TBA: 2023 ISA World SUP and Paddleboard Championship (location TBA)

2023 World Surf League

- January 29 – February 10: Billabong Pipeline Masters in (Hawaii) Banzai Pipeline (Oahu)
- February 12–23: Hurley Pro Sunset Beach in (Hawaii) Sunset Beach (Oahu)
- March 8–16: MEO Pro Portugal in Supertubos (Peniche)
- April 4–14: Rip Curl Pro in (Australia) Bells Beach, Victoria
- April 20–30: Margaret River Pro in Margaret River, Western Australia
- May 27 & 28: Freshwater Pro in (United States) Lemoore
- June 9–18: Surf City El Salvador Pro in La Libertad
- June 23 – July 1: Rio Pro in (Brazil) Saquarema
- July 13–22: J-Bay Open in (South Africa) Jeffreys Bay
- August 11–20: Billabong Pro Teahupoo in (French Polynesia) Teahupo'o
- September 7–15: 2023 World Surf League Finals in (United States) Trestles (San Clemente, California)

== Swimming ==
Synchronized swimming World Cup

- March 16–18: Artistic Swimming World Cup (ASWC) #1 in (Canada) Markham
- April 28–30: ASWC #2 in (Egypt) Cairo
- May 5–7: ASWC #3 in (France) Montpellier

Open water swimming Tour

- May 20 & 21: OWS #1 in (Italy) Golfo Aranci
- May 27 & 28: OWS #2 in (Portugal) Setúbal
- August 5 & 6: OWS #3 in (France) Paris
- October 28 & 29: OWS #4 in (Taiwan) Nantou City
- November 4 & 5: OWS #5 in Hong Kong
- December 1 & 2: OWS #6 in (Israel) Eilat

== See also ==
- 2023 in sports
  - 2023 in sports (A)
  - 2023 in sports (B)
  - 2023 in sports (C–J)
  - 2023 in sports (T–Z)
