= Fast5 netball =

Five-a-side netball

- Highest governing body: World Netball
- First played: As Fastnet at the 2009 World Netball Series; As Fast5 at the 2012 Fast5 Netball World Series

Characteristics
- Contact: No
- Team members: 5 per side
- Mixed-sex: No, separate competitions
- Type: Team sport, ball game
- Equipment: Netball
- Venue: Netball court

Presence
- Country or region: Worldwide
- Olympic: No
- Paralympic: No

Fast5 netball is a five-a-side version of netball. It evolved from the Fastnet rules first introduced by the International Federation of Netball Associations for the 2009 World Netball Series. Fastnet featured four six-minute quarters, two-point shots from outside the goal circle and a power play during which all goals counted double. However, like traditional netball, Fastnet was a seven-a-side game. Ahead of the 2012 Fast5 Netball World Series, the rules were revised and Fastnet became known as Fast5. As part of this transition, the game changed from seven-a-side to five-a-side. In 2017, Netball Superleague teams began playing in the British Fast5 Netball All-Stars Championship. In 2023, Fast5 netball made its debut at the Commonwealth Youth Games.

== History ==
=== Fastnet ===
In December 2008, the International Federation of Netball Associations announced the details of a new international netball tournament, the World Netball Series. The new series would feature a new set of rules, which eventually became known as fastnet rules. The new rules had been trialled by the England national netball team over the previous year. The new rules were designed to make matches faster and more television-friendly. It was hoped that this shortened version of the game would help Netball become an Olympic sport. Between 2009 and 2011, the World Netball Series used Fastnet rules.

- Matches will be 4 x 6 minutes with 3 x 2 minute breaks.
- Seven players on court, five on the bench.
- Rolling substitutions i.e. no stoppages with an unlimited number of substitutions per team allowed per quarter.
- After a goal is scored, the game restarts from the centre in favour of the team conceding.
- Alternative centre passes at the beginning of the second, third and fourth quarter.
- There is no whistle after a goal is scored.
- Coaches will be allowed to coach from the sideline, but only in front of their bench.
- Each team will elect one quarter as a power play when any goals they score will be doubled.
- Shooters may shoot from outside of the circle, all successful goals will be worth double. In a power play this could escalate to four goals.
- The umpire will signal by raising one hand for one goal and two hands for two goals.

=== Fast5 rules ===
Ahead of the 2012 Fast5 Netball World Series, the rules were revised and Fastnet became known as Fast5. As part of this transition, the game changed from seven-a-side to five-a-side.

The Teams

- Each team may consist of up to ten players.
- There are five playing positions in each team whose playing areas are the same as in Netball: Goal Shooter (GS), Goal Attack (GA), Centre (C), Goal Defence (GD), Goal Keeper (GK).
- The teams playing uniforms shall preferably be distinct in style from the uniforms worn in Netball.

The Game

- The game consists of four quarters of six minutes each, with an interval of two minutes between the first-second and third-fourth quarters. The half time interval is four minutes. Teams shall change ends each quarter.
- Before the start of the game the Captain shall toss for choice of goal end and Power Play quarter.
- The team winning the coin toss shall choose the goal end for the start of play, take the first Centre Pass in the first and third quarters. All other Centre Passes shall be taken by the team that did not score the last goal. The team winning the coin toss shall also have first choice of a power play quarter.
- The team losing the coin toss shall take the first Centre Pass in the second and fourth quarters, choose a Power Play quarter not selected by the other team.
- Substitutions may be made at intervals or at any time during play and there is no limit to the number that can be made.

Scoring a Goal

Each successful goal will score a number of goal points as specified below:

- 3 goal points: the Super Shot is deemed to have been made from outside the Goal Circle - this means the player who takes the shot shall not have any contact with the ground inside the Goal Circle during the catching of the ball or whilst holding it
- 2 goal points: the shot is deemed to have been made from the Outer Circle - this means the player who takes the shot shall not have any contact with the ground inside the Inner Circle during the catching of the ball whilst holding it
- 1 goal point: the shot is deemed to have been made from the Inner Circle.
- The Scorers will indicate when a team is using its Power Play. During a team's Power Play quarter all goal points scored are doubled.

Extra Time

When scores are tied at the end of the fourth quarter:

- Play will stop and players remain in position on Court (no change of ends):
- The Captains will toss for the next Centre Pass
- Play will recommence for a period of one minute. If at the end of this period, one team is leading, this team will be declared the winner
- If the scores are tied at the end of this period, play will continue until one team scores a goal
- Power Play will not apply in Extra Time.

Hand Signals

All other signals remain the same as for Netball.

- Contact - the same hand signal is used for the Contact infringements, namely a closed fist hit into an open (vertical) hand.
- One Goal Point - a single arm is raised vertically to indicate a successful shot from the Inner Circle (one goal point area).
- Two Goal Points - both arms are raised vertically to indicate a successful shot from the Outer Circle (two goal point area).
- Three Goal Points - both arms are raised crossed above the head to indicate a successful shot from outside the Goal Circle (three goal point area).

== Competitions ==
=== Fast5 Netball World Series ===
The Fast5 Netball World Series is an international Fast5 tournament organised by World Netball. The series features the top six national netball teams, according to the World Netball Rankings. Between 2009 and 2011 it was known as the World Netball Series. New Zealand won the inaugural series and were initially the competition's dominant team. Between 2009 and 2018, they won seven of the nine tournaments played. During the 2020s, Australia won three successive titles. Since 2022, the series has also featured a men's netball tournament.

=== All Sectors Netball League ===
Trinidad and Tobago's All Sectors Netball League embraced the new fastnet, and then the revised Fast5 rules early on. Since 2010, each division has played a fastnet or Fast5 knockout competition. The winners receive a Justin Bowen trophy.

=== Netball Superleague ===
In 2017, Netball Superleague teams began playing in the British Fast5 Netball All-Stars Championship. Loughborough Lightning won the inaugural championship after defeating Team Bath 35–33 in the final.

=== Commonwealth Youth Games ===
In 2023, Fast5 netball made its debut at the Commonwealth Youth Games. Australia won the inaugural tournament after defeating South Africa 35–23 in the gold medal match.
