= South Africa men's national netball team =

Men's National Netball team

South Africa
- National federation: Netball South Africa
- Coach: Jabulani Vilane
- Nickname: Puma Proteas
Away

The South Africa men's national netball team, nicknamed the Puma Proteas, represents Netball South Africa in international men's netball competitions, including the Men's Africa Netball Cup and the Men's Fast5 Netball World Series.

== History ==
=== Early matches, tournaments ===
The South Africa Men's team has been in development since 2019. They initially play behind closed doors matches against the South Africa Women. However, in September 2021, Netball South Africa hosted the International Male Netball Tournament at Pretoria's Heartfelt Arena. It featured Uganda, Kenya and South Africa who emerged as winners. In September 2022, South Africa Men took part in the Americas Netball Men's Championship as a guest.

== Tournament history ==
=== Men's Fast5 Netball World Series ===
Since 2023, South Africa Men have played in the Men's Fast5 Netball World Series.

Tournaments	Place
2023 Men's Fast5 Netball World Series	3rd
2024 Men's Fast5 Netball World Series	3rd

=== Men's Africa Netball Cup ===
In 2023, South Africa Men won the inaugural Men's Africa Netball Cup. They defeated Zimbabwe 45–40 in the final.

Tournaments	Place
2023 Men's Africa Netball Cup	1st
2024 Men's Africa Netball Cup	1st

== Notable players ==
=== Captains ===
	Years
Shiko Mokaila	2023
Vukile Zulu	2024
Sicelo Gamede	2024

== Head coaches ==
Coach	Years
Neville Chapepa	2023, 2024
Jabulani Vilane	2022, 2023, 2024
