= England men's national netball team =

England
- National federation: England Men's and Mixed Netball Association; England Netball
- Coach: Sharon Lewis-Burke
- Nickname: England Thorns
Home Kit

First international
- England 27–73 Australia; 30 October 2022

The England men's national netball team, nicknamed the England Thorns, represents the England Men's and Mixed Netball Association in international men's netball competitions.

== History ==
The Thorns were first formed in March 2022. They helped with the Roses preparation for the 2022 Commonwealth Games, joining them in their pre games training camp for a series of matches.

== Tournament history ==
=== Australia England series ===
On 30 October 2022, England played their debut international test against Australia Men where they were defeated 73–27. The match was played before the second test of the 2022 Australia England women's series and was televised.

A three test series was announced to commence in May 2025 named the Aurora Series.

Tournaments	Result
2022 Australia England series	Loss
2025 England Australia series	Loss

=== Men's Fast5 Netball World Series ===
The Thorns played in the inaugural 2022 Men's Fast5 Netball World Series.

Tournaments	Result
2022 Men's Fast5 Netball World Series	3rd

=== Americas Netball Men's Championships ===
Tournaments	Result
2024 Americas Netball Men's Championships	2nd

== Notable players ==
=== Current Squad ===
England Men's Current Squad
Shooters	Centre Court	Defenders
James Firminger	Jared Bleakley	Taiwo Aliu
Ky Lewis	Ross McCartney Oliphant	Justin Bishop
Luke Owen	Lee Robnett	James McClelland
Nathan Ramsdale-Owen	James Thomson-Boston	Martyn Nantongwe
Tommy Wiseman	Maxwell Wynn	Jamal Nicholson

== Coaches ==
Coach	Years
Sharron Lewis-Burke	2022–present
