= Wooden spoon (award) =

Award for coming last in a competition

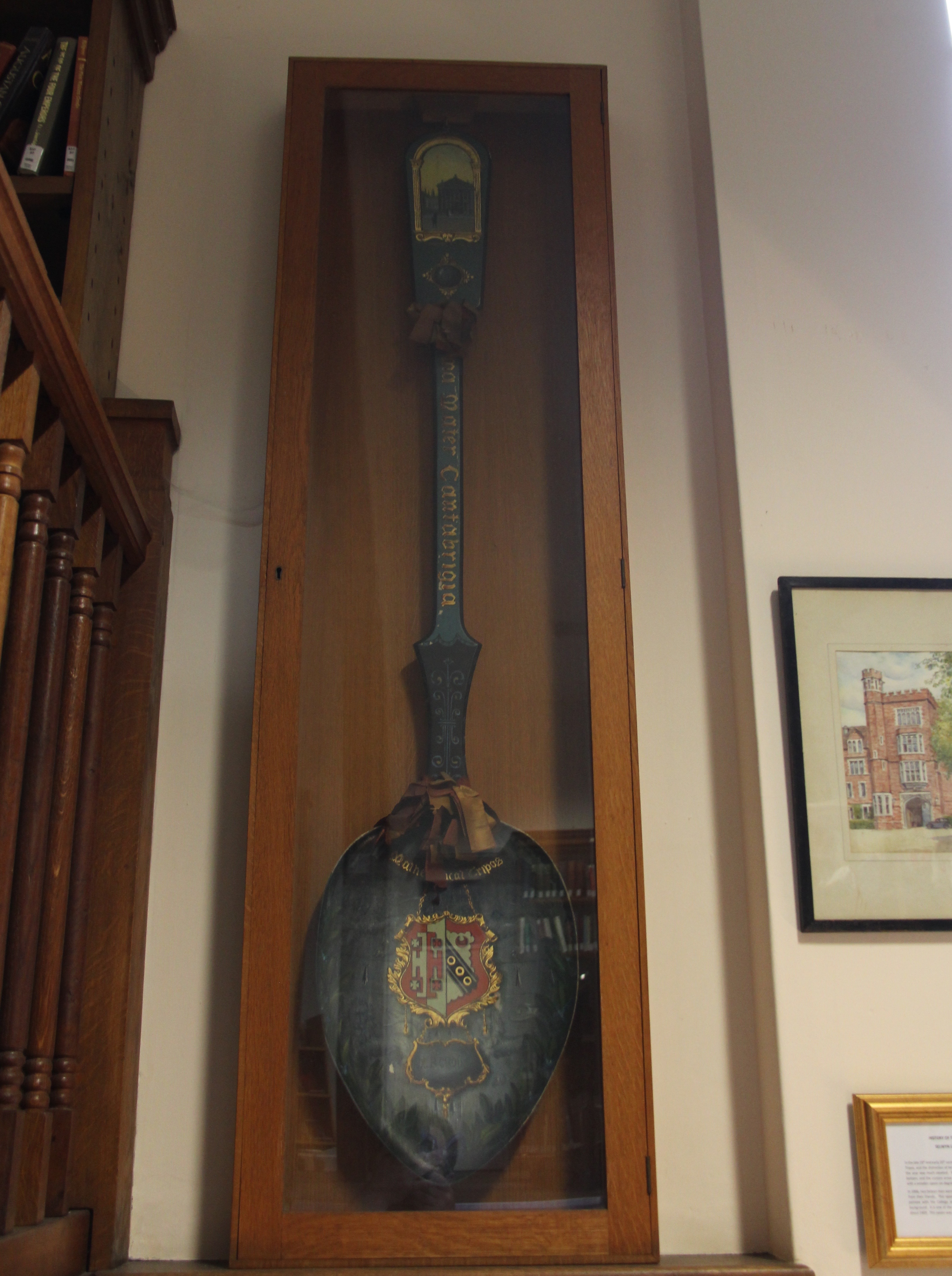
Wooden spoon at Selwyn College, Cambridge

A wooden spoon is an award given to an individual or team that has come last in a competition. Examples range from the academic to sporting and more frivolous events. The term is of English origin and has spread to other English-speaking countries. In most cases it is simply a colloquial term for coming last – there is no actual award given.

== At the University of Cambridge ==
The wooden spoon was presented originally at the University of Cambridge as a booby prize awarded by students to the candidate for the Mathematical Tripos who achieved the lowest marks while still earning a third-class degree (a junior optime). The term "wooden spoon" or simply "the spoon" was also applied to the recipient, and the prize became quite notorious:

And while he lives, he wields the boasted prize
Whose value all can feel, the weak, the wise;
Displays in triumph his distinguish'd boon,
The solid honours of the Wooden Spoon

The spoons themselves, actually made of wood, grew larger, and in latter years measured up to five feet long. By tradition, they were dangled in a teasing way from the upstairs balcony in the Senate House, in front of the recipient as he came before the Vice-Chancellor to receive his degree, at least until 1875 when the practice was specifically banned by the university.

The lowest placed students earning a second-class (senior optime) or first-class degree (wrangler) were sometimes known as the "silver spoon" and "golden spoon" respectively. In contrast, the highest-scoring male student was named the "senior wrangler".

Students unfortunate enough to place below the wooden spoon, by achieving only an Ordinary degree, were given a variety of names depending on their number. In the 1860s about three-quarters of the roughly 400 candidates did not score enough to be awarded honours, and were known as poll men.

The custom dates back at least to the late 18th century, being recorded in 1803, and continued until 1909. From 1910 onwards the results have been given in alphabetical rather than score order, and so it is now impossible to tell who has come last, unless there is only one person in the lowest class.

Some wooden spoon recipients went on to become infamous, occasionally causing costly miscalculations within their careers.

=== Last award ===
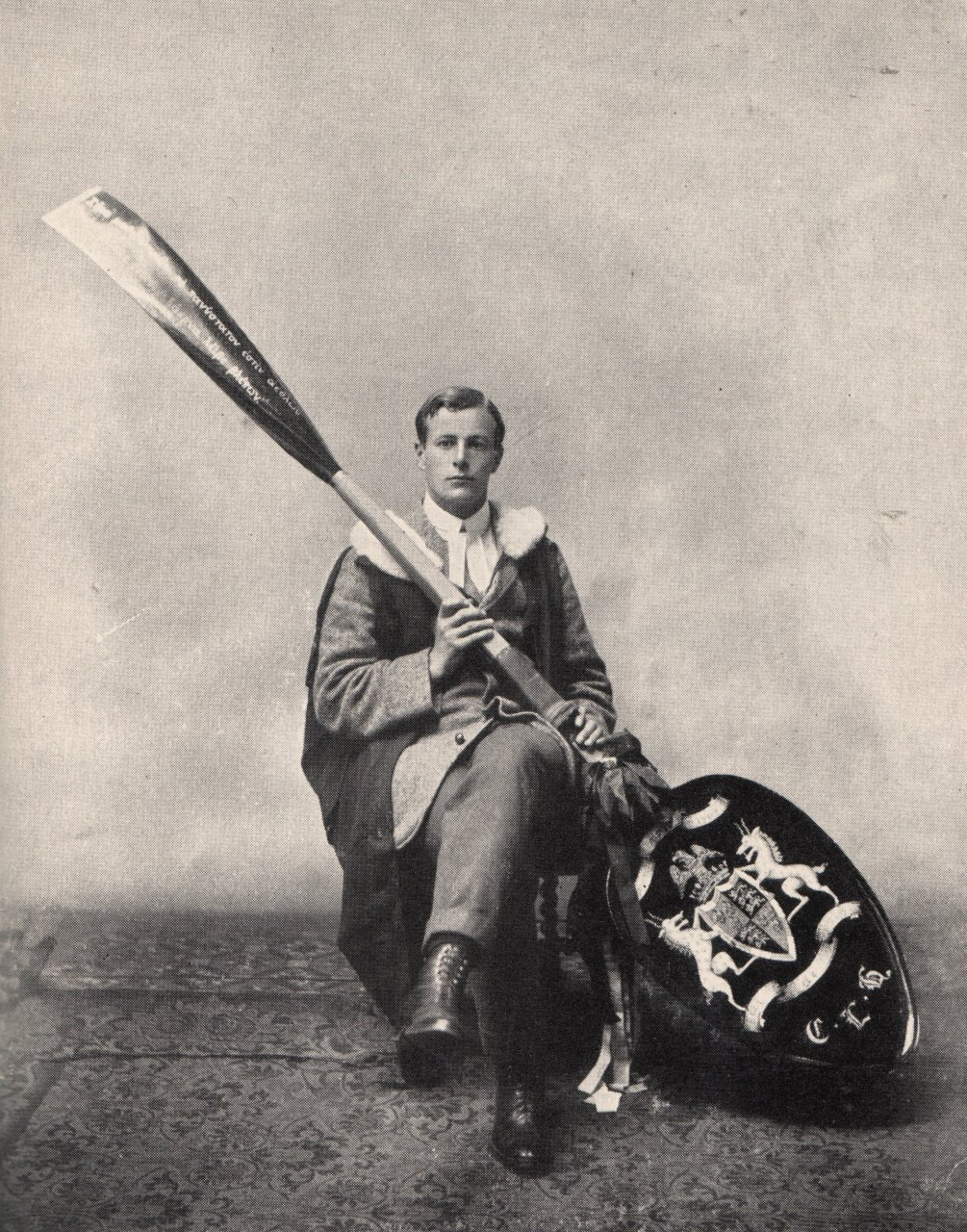
The last wooden spoon

The last wooden spoon was awarded to Cuthbert Lempriere Holthouse, an oarsman of the Lady Margaret Boat Club of St John's College, Cambridge, in 1909 at the graduation ceremony in the university's Senate House. The handle is shaped like an oar and inscribed with an epigram in Greek which may be translated as follows:

In Honours Mathematical,
This is the very last of all
The Wooden Spoons which you see here;
O you who see it, shed a tear.

Alternatively:

This wooden object is the last souvenir of the competitive examinations in mathematics. Look upon it, and weep.

The last spoon to be awarded is now in the possession of St John's College, Cambridge, with an earlier version being kept at the Selwyn College Library. From 8 June 2009 to 26 June 2009, St John's College held an exhibition of the five surviving wooden spoons in College hands, from St John's (1909), Selwyn's (1906), Emmanuel's (1889) and Corpus Christi's (1895 and 1907) to mark the centenary of the awarding of the last spoon. There are five known wooden spoons in private hands.

== In sport ==
=== Rugby union ===
In rugby union's Six Nations Championship, the wooden spoon is a metaphorical award won by the team finishing in last place. In addition, if a team loses all its matches it is also said to have been "whitewashed". In 1892, Rugby Football, by Rev. F. Marshall explains, "all three matches being lost, Wales thus earned the “wooden spoon” of International football for this season". In 1894, the South Wales Daily Post remarked that within the Home Nations Championships the Ireland-Wales match has been to decide which team should be recipient of the ignominious Wooden Spoon.

=== Australian and New Zealand sports ===
The term is commonly used in Australian and New Zealand sporting competitions (such as the AFL, the A-League, NRL, and Super Rugby) and refers to the club positioned last on the league table at the end of the season.

Games between teams 'competing' for the wooden spoon have recently become referred to as 'spoon Bowls', a play on the NFL's Super Bowl.

==== Suncorp Super Netball ====
In the 2017 and 2018 Suncorp Super Netball seasons, the Adelaide Thunderbirds claimed the wooden spoon. In the latter year, they lost all fourteen of their regular season matches, resulting in Dan Ryan being sacked as the club's coach.

The Queensland Firebirds, Collingwood Magpies and Melbourne Vixens have won the past three wooden spoons, with the Vixens the most recent recipient of the award.

=== Major League Soccer ===
In Canada and the United States' men's Major League Soccer, the last-place team in the overall standings is generally considered as the "wooden spoon champion". However, unlike other Wooden Spoon awards, there is a physical "trophy" for the award. Before the start of the 2016 MLS season, the Independent Supporters Council created an actual "trophy" for the lowest-place team in the league, as a complement to the Supporters' Shield the ISC also manages. The trophy is passed to the "winning" team at the annual ISC general meeting, and the holders of the Spoon must possess the spoon for the entire following season. At the end of the year, every group awarded the Wooden Spoon are allowed to do what they will with the trophy, including refusing to display it.

The Chicago Fire were the "winner" of the inaugural 2015 wooden spoon trophy and their supporters had the responsibility of creating the first spoon. The award was christened the Andrew Hauptman Memorial Wooden Spoon by Chicago Fire supporters as a protest against the team's then-owner, Andrew Hauptman (2007–2019). The spoon was renamed in 2017 to the Anthony Precourt Memorial Wooden Spoon, after the then-owner of the Columbus Crew, who at the time was attempting to move the franchise to Austin.

Two teams hold the league record for most spoon "wins" overall, the San Jose Earthquakes (1997, 2000, 2008, 2018, 2024), and D.C. United (2002, 2010, 2013, 2022, 2025). In the wake of the COVID-19 pandemic, the wooden spoon was not officially awarded following the 2020 MLS season (which would have been won by FC Cincinnati), as the ISC board "felt it was inappropriate to offer such a distinction for shortened and geographically-limited seasons". The current spoon holders are CF Montréal (2026).

=== Canadian Premier League ===
The Canadian Premier League has an unofficial trophy, awarded to the team that finishes with the fewest points at the end of the regular season. The most recent recipient are Pacific FC as of the 2026 season.

=== Oxford and Cambridge rowing ===
In the Cambridge and Oxford bumps races, a crew who get bumped each day (thus moving down four places) are awarded spoons. This is probably related to the use of wooden spoons as a booby prize in the University of Cambridge Mathematical Tripos, and also contrasts with the blades received by crews that bump their opponents each day (moving up four places). Spoons are engraved with the names of the rowers and cox.

=== Tennis ===
A wooden spoon, also known as the "anti-slam", is sometimes spoken about in tennis. It is described as the worst possible outcome in a tournament, won by the player who is defeated in the first round by a player who is defeated in the second round, by a player who is defeated in the third round and so forth, until the final of the tournament.

Greg Rusedski (1994 and 1995 US Open, 2006 Wimbledon Championships), Nicolás Lapentti (1996 French Open, 1997 and 2009 Wimbledon Championships) and Julien Benneteau (2014 and 2016 US Open, 2016 French Open) have claimed three wooden spoons throughout their career.

== See also ==
- County Championship Wooden Spoons
- Lanterne rouge – the last finisher in a cycling race
- Wooden Spoon Society
- Nul points
