= 2024 Men's Fast5 Netball World Series =

International men's fast5 tournament

Tournament details
- Host country: New Zealand
- City: Christchurch
- Dates: 9–10 November 2024
- Teams: 3
- Venue: Wolfbrook Arena

Final positions
- Champions: Australia (1st title)
- Runners-up: New Zealand
- Third place: South Africa

Tournament statistics
- Matches played: 4

The 2024 Men's Fast5 Netball World Series was the 3rd Men's Fast5 Netball World Series. The tournament was played at Christchurch's Wolfbrook Arena, alongside the women's series, in November 2024. The series featured three men's netball teams representing New Zealand, Australia and South Africa. Australia won the series after defeating New Zealand 32–30 in the final. Australia's pre-match dance to NSYNC's Bye Bye Bye saw them widely viewed on social media. However, this also led to homophobic abuse. Channel 7 had to limit the comments on their social media posts of the video.

== Round robin stage ==
9 November 2024; 14:45 (NZDT)	Australia	42–27	South Africa
9 November 2024; 14:45 (NZDT)	Liam Killey 18; William Whiteacre 10; Dravyn Lee-Tauroa 10; Jordon Webb 4		Eugene Sinxezi 12; Pheu Lethoko 9 Shane Labuschagne 6

9 November 2024; 18:00 (NZDT)	New Zealand	32–28	Australia
9 November 2024; 18:00 (NZDT)	Thomson Matuku 24; Mikaira Raerino 6 Josh Powell 1 Kyle Wray 1		Liam Killey 13; Dravyn Lee-Tauroa 8 Jordon Webb 6 William Whiteacre 1

10 November 2024; 14:15 (NZDT)	New Zealand	32–31	South Africa
10 November 2024; 14:15 (NZDT)	Thomson Matuku 14; Mikaira Raerino 7 Josh Powell 6 Kyle Wray 3		Pheu Lethoko 21; Shane Labuschagne 6 Eugene Sinxezi 2 Fred Damons 2

== Final ==
10 November 2024; 17:20 (NZDT)	New Zealand	30–32	Australia
10 November 2024; 17:20 (NZDT)	Mikaira Raerino 16; Thomson Matuku 11; Kyle Wray 3		Liam Killey 10; Dravyn Lee-Tauroa 10; William Whiteacre 8 Jordon Webb 4

== Final placings ==
Rank	Team
1st place, gold medalist(s)	Australia
2nd place, silver medalist(s)	New Zealand
3rd place, bronze medalist(s)	South Africa
