= 2022 Men's Fast5 Netball World Series =

International men's fast5 tournament

Tournament details
- Host country: New Zealand
- City: Christchurch
- Dates: 5–6 November 2022
- Teams: 3
- Venue: Wolfbrook Arena

Final positions
- Champions: New Zealand (1st title)
- Runners-up: Australia
- Third place: England

Tournament statistics
- Matches played: 4

The 2022 Men's Fast5 Netball World Series was the inaugural Men's Fast5 Netball World Series. The tournament was played at Christchurch's Wolfbrook Arena, alongside the women's series, in November 2022. The series featured three men's netball teams representing New Zealand, Australia and England. New Zealand won the series after defeating Australia 29–25 in the final.

== Head coaches and captains ==
Team	Head coach	Captain
New Zealand	Dion Te Whetu	Nick Grimmer
Australia	Nerida Stewart	Brodie Roberts
England	Sharron Lewis-Burke	Jamal Nicholson

== Round robin stage ==
=== Matches ===
5 November 2022; 14:45 (NZDT)	Stats	Australia	29–20	England
5 November 2022; 14:45 (NZDT)	Stats	Anton Stechiwskyj 11; Dravyn Lee-Tauroa 9 Brodie Roberts 5 Eugene Lee 4		Ross Oliphant 15; Luke Owen 4 Damian Williams 1

5 November 2022; 18:30 (NZDT)	Stats	New Zealand	24–31	Australia
5 November 2022; 18:30 (NZDT)	Stats	Thomson Matuku 11; Amosa Faitaua-Nanai 10; Te Reiwhati Vercoe 3		Anton Stechiwskyj 13; Brodie Roberts 8 Dravyn Lee-Tauroa 7 Eugene Lee 3

6 November 2022; 14:15 (NZDT)	Stats	New Zealand	36–22	England
6 November 2022; 14:15 (NZDT)	Stats	Thomson Matuku 17; Amosa Faitaua-Nanai 10; Te Reiwhati Vercoe 9		Luke Owen 19; Lewis Keeling 2 Jamal Nicholson 1

=== Table ===
Pos	Team	P	W	D	L	GF	GA	GD	Pts
1	Australia	2	2	0	0	60	44	+16	4
2	New Zealand	2	1	0	1	60	53	+7	2
3	England	2	0	0	2	42	65	-23	0

Qualified for the final

== Final ==
6 November 2022; 17:20 (NZDT)	Stats	New Zealand	29–25	Australia
6 November 2022; 17:20 (NZDT)	Stats	Thomson Matuku 13; Amosa Faitaua-Nanai 11; Te Reiwhati Vercoe 5		Anton Stechiwskyj 10; Brodie Roberts 10; Eugene Lee 5

== Final Placings ==
Rank	Team
1st place, gold medalist(s)	New Zealand
2nd place, silver medalist(s)	Australia
3rd place, bronze medalist(s)	England
