= England Men's and Mixed Netball Association =

Governing body for men's and mixed netball in England

- Sport: Netball; Men's Netball
- Jurisdiction: England
- Abbreviation: EMMNA
- Founded: 2019; 6 years ago
- Affiliation: England Netball
- President: Ryan Allan
- Coach: Sharon Lewis-Burke
- Sponsor: Flyhawk; Physique

Official website
- www.englandmmna.com
- (England)

England Men's and Mixed Netball Association (EMMNA) is the recognised governing body for men's and mixed netball in England. It works in partnership with England Netball.

== Overview ==
EMMNA was founded in 2019 and is responsible for the management of the England men's national netball team, nicknamed England Thorns and the U23 Trailblazers, the national men’s and mixed leagues and player development pathways.

== Competitions and Leagues ==
England Netball organises the following competitions and leagues:

- National Men's League
- National Mixed League
- National Championship tournament
- University Men’s Netball Cup

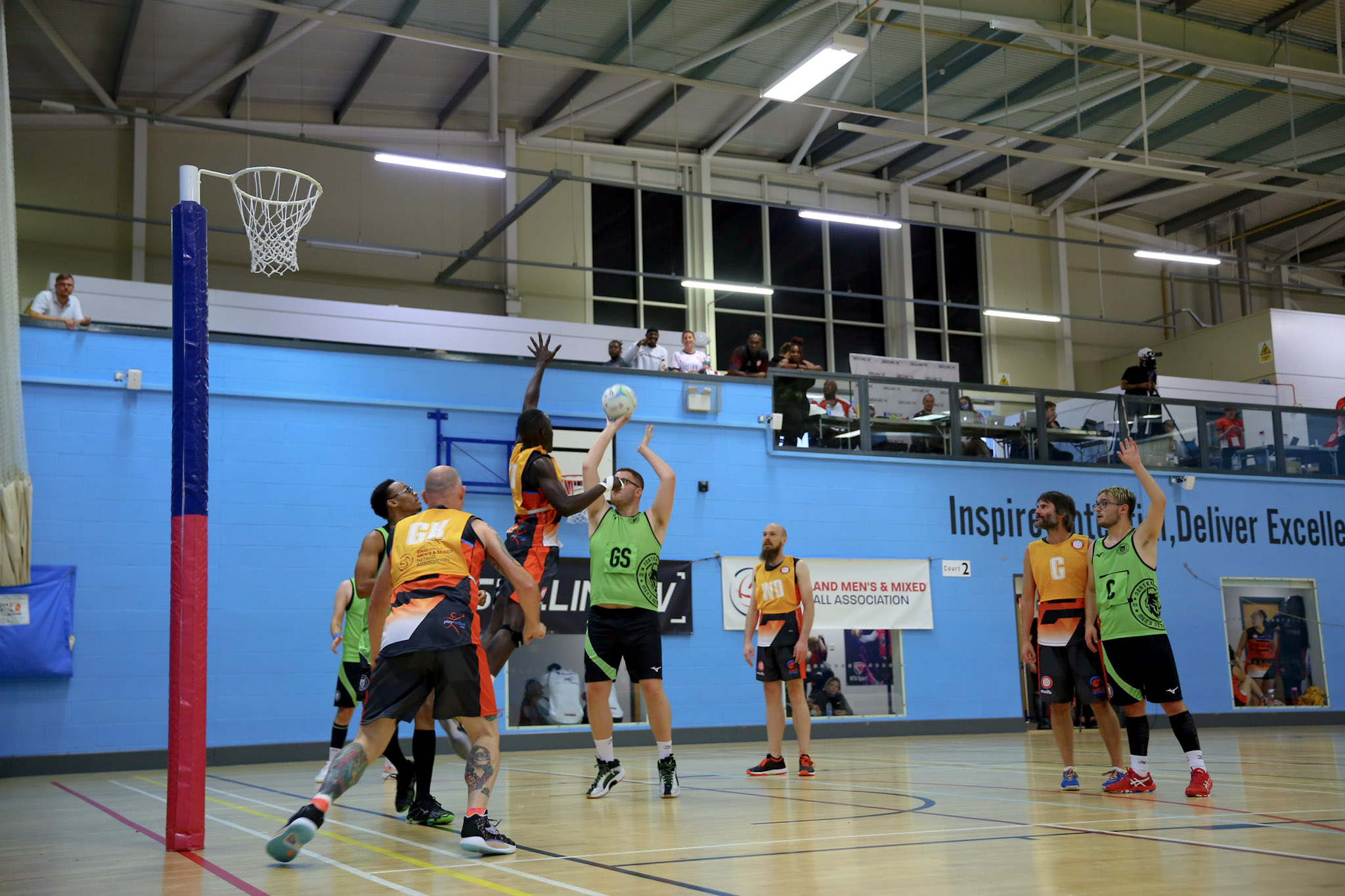
London Giants v Northern Titans at 2021 England Men's & Mixed Netball National Championships
