= 2023 Men's Fast5 Netball World Series =

International men's fast5 tournament

Tournament details
- Host country: New Zealand
- City: Christchurch
- Dates: 11–12 November 2023
- Teams: 3
- Venue: Wolfbrook Arena

Final positions
- Champions: New Zealand (2nd title)
- Runners-up: Australia
- Third place: South Africa

Tournament statistics
- Matches played: 4

The 2023 Men's Fast5 Netball World Series was the 2nd Men's Fast5 Netball World Series. The tournament was played at Christchurch's Wolfbrook Arena, alongside the women's series, in November 2023. The series featured three men's netball teams representing New Zealand, Australia and South Africa. New Zealand won their second successive series after defeating Australia 51–34 in the final.

== Group stage ==
11 November 2023; 2:45PM	Stats	Australia	50–39	South Africa
11 November 2023; 2:45PM	Stats	Jordon Webb 33; Thomas Hardwick 12; Jerome Gillbard 3 Nathan Germech 2		Shane Labuschange 29; Riyaaz Lavendal 7 William Lethoko 3

11 November 2023; 6:00PM	Stats	New Zealand	42–29	Australia
11 November 2023; 6:00PM	Stats	Scoring by quarter: 10–4, 20–9, 31–18, 42–29
11 November 2023; 6:00PM	Stats	Thomson Matuku 18; Junior Levi 15; Josh Powell 9		Jordon Webb 19; Thomas Hardwick 6 Jerome Gillbard 3 Nathan Germech 1

12 November 2023; 2:15PM	Stats	New Zealand	38–31	South Africa
12 November 2023; 2:15PM	Stats	Thomson Matuku 14; Junior Levi 13; Josh Powell 11		Shane Labuschange 22; William Lethoko 5 Riyaaz Lavendal 4

== Final ==
12 November 2023; 5:30PM	Stats	New Zealand	51–34	Australia
12 November 2023; 5:30PM	Stats	Scoring by quarter: 16–11, 28–27, 45–30, 51–34
12 November 2023; 5:30PM	Stats	Thomson Matuku 30; Junior Levi 15; Josh Powell 6		Jordon Webb 18; Jerome Gillbard 14; Thomas Hardwick 2

== Final placings ==
Rank	Team
1st place, gold medalist(s)	New Zealand
2nd place, silver medalist(s)	Australia
3rd place, bronze medalist(s)	South Africa
