= Australia men's national netball team =

Men's national netball team

Australia
- National federation: Australian Men's and Mixed Netball Association
- Coach: Nerida Stewart
- Nickname: Kelpies
First	Alternative

The Australia men's national netball team represents the Australian Men's and Mixed Netball Association in international men's netball competitions, including the Trans-Tasman Cup, played against New Zealand, and the Men's Fast5 Netball World Series. During the 2020s, Trans-Tasman Cup matches have acted as curtain raisers for Constellation Cup matches, while the Men's Fast5 Netball World Series' have been played alongside the women's series. They were formerly nicknamed the Sonix, however since 2023 they have been rebranded as the Kelpies.

== Tournament history ==
=== Trans-Tasman Cup ===
Since 1985, Australia Men and New Zealand Men have played each other in a Trans Tasman series. The series have featured both open and under-23 tournaments. In the 2020s these matches began to be televised. The 2022 Trans-Tasman Cup series acted as a curtain raiser for the 2022 Constellation Cup. On 12 October 2022, at Auckland's Spark Arena, Australia Men defeated New Zealand Men 64–48 in the first men's televised Trans-Tasman match. Ahead of the 2023 series, the Australia Men were given a new nickname, the Kelpies, named after the Australian Kelpie. They were previously known as the Australian Sonix.

Tournaments	Place
2018 Trans-Tasman Cup	1st
2022 Trans-Tasman Cup	1st
2023 Trans-Tasman Cup	1st
2024 Trans-Tasman Cup	1st

=== Australia England series ===
On 30 October 2022, Australia Men defeated England Men 73–27. This was England's debut international test. The match was played before the second test of the 2022 Australia England women's series and was televised.

Tournaments	Place
2022 Australia England series	1st
2025 England Australia series	

=== Men's Fast5 Netball World Series ===
Since 2022, Australia Men have played in the Men's Fast5 Netball World Series. Australia won the 2024 series after defeating New Zealand 32–30 in the final. Australia's pre-match dance to NSYNC's Bye Bye Bye saw them widely viewed on social media. However, this also led to homophobic abuse. Channel 7 had to limit the comments on their social media posts of the video.

Tournaments	Place
2022 Men's Fast5 Netball World Series	2nd
2023 Men's Fast5 Netball World Series	2nd
2024 Men's Fast5 Netball World Series	1st

== Notable players ==
=== Captains ===
	Years
Junior Levi	2014
Will Jamison	2016
Dan Ryan	201x
Levi Talolua	2018
Andrew Simons	2019
Dylan Nexhip	2022, 2023
Brodie Roberts	2022

== Coaches ==
=== Head coaches ===
Coach	Years
Dave Mills	2013
Christina Puopolo	2016
Kimberly Kiely	2018
Nerida Stewart	2022–

=== Assistant coaches ===
Coach	Years
Julie Fitzgerald	2024
