= Fast5 Netball World Series =

International Fast5 netball competition

- Current season, competition or edition: 2024 Fast5 Netball World Series
- Sport: Fast5 netball
- First season: 2009
- Owner: World Netball
- No. of teams: 6
- Most recent champion: Australia
- Most titles: New Zealand (7 titles)
- Broadcasters: 7plus (Australia); Sky Sport (New Zealand); SuperSport (South Africa); SportsMax (Caribbean); NetballPass
- Website: Fast5 Netball World Series

The Fast5 Netball World Series is an international Fast5 netball tournament organised by World Netball. The series features the top six national netball teams, according to the World Netball Rankings. Between 2009 and 2011 it was known as the World Netball Series. New Zealand won the inaugural series and were initially the competition's dominant team. Between 2009 and 2018, they won seven of the nine tournaments played. During the 2020s, Australia won three successive titles. Since 2022, the series has also featured a men's netball tournament.

== History ==
=== Fastnet ===
In December 2008, the International Federation of Netball Associations announced the details of a new international netball tournament, the World Netball Series. The new series would feature a new set of rules, which eventually became known as fastnet rules. Between 2009 and 2011, the tournament was known as the World Netball Series and these early editions used Fastnet rules. In 2012 the tournament became known as the Fast5 Netball World Series after adopting a revised set of new Fast5 netball rules.

=== New Zealand ===
With a team coached by Ruth Aitken and captained by Casey Williams, New Zealand won the inaugural 2009 World Netball Series after defeating Jamaica 32–27 in the final. New Zealand were initially the competition's dominant team. Between 2009 and 2018, they won seven of the nine tournaments played.

=== England ===
In 2011, with a team coached by Anna Mayes and captained by Jade Clarke, England defeated New Zealand 33–26 in the final to win their first major tournament. In 2017, with a team coached by Tracey Neville and captained by Ama Agbeze, England won the series for a second time. In the final they defeated Jamaica 34–29.

=== Australia ===
In 2022, Australia won the series for the first time. They subsequently retained the title in both 2023 and 2024.

=== Men's tournament ===
Since 2022, the series has also featured a men's netball tournament. New Zealand were the inaugural winners.

== Finals ==
=== World Netball Series ===
Series	Winners	Score	Runners up	Venue
2009	New Zealand	32–27	Jamaica	MEN Arena
2010	New Zealand	28–26	England	Echo Arena
2011	England	33–26	New Zealand	Echo Arena

=== Fast5 Netball World Series ===
Series	Winners	Score	Runners up	Venue
2012	New Zealand	23–21	England	Vector Arena
2013	New Zealand	56–27	Australia	Vector Arena
2014	New Zealand	35–31	Australia	Vector Arena
2016	New Zealand	41–16	Australia	Hisense Arena
2017	England	34–29	Jamaica	Hisense Arena
2018	New Zealand	34–33	Jamaica	Melbourne Arena
2022	Australia	34–20	South Africa	Wolfbrook Arena
2023	Australia	35–23	New Zealand	Wolfbrook Arena
2024	Australia	34–30	New Zealand	Wolfbrook Arena

=== Men's Fast5 Netball World Series ===
Series	Winners	Score	Runners up	Venue
2022	New Zealand	29–25	Australia	Wolfbrook Arena
2023	New Zealand	51–34	Australia	Wolfbrook Arena
2024	Australia	32–30	New Zealand	Wolfbrook Arena

== 3rd/4th Playoffs ==
=== World Netball Series ===
Series	Winners	Score	Runners up	Venue
2009	Australia	23–18	England	MEN Arena
2010	Jamaica	30–29	Australia	Echo Arena
2011	Australia	32–24	Jamaica	Echo Arena

=== Fast5 Netball World Series ===
Series	Winners	Score	Runners up	Venue
2012	South Africa	38–34	Jamaica	Vector Arena
2013	Jamaica	44–17	South Africa	Vector Arena
2014	England	31–30	Jamaica	Vector Arena
2016	Malawi	35–32	England	Hisense Arena
2017	Australia	34–15	New Zealand	Hisense Arena
2018	Australia	38–15	Malawi	Melbourne Arena
2022	New Zealand	39–25	England	Wolfbrook Arena
2023	England	30–22	South Africa	Wolfbrook Arena
2024	Uganda	46–42	South Africa	Wolfbrook Arena
