= 2023 Men's Africa Netball Cup =

Tournament details
- Host country: Botswana
- City: Gaborone
- Venue: University of Botswana Indoor Facility
- Dates: 28 November 2023 – 6 December 2023
- Teams: 4

Final positions
- Champions: South Africa
- Runners-up: Zimbabwe
- Third place: Kenya

Tournament statistics
- Matches played: 8

The 2023 Men's Africa Netball Cup was the inaugural edition of the Men's Netball Africa Cup organised by Africa Netball. It was held at the University of Botswana Indoor Facility in Gaborone, Botswana.

== Teams ==
- Botswana
- Kenya
- South Africa
- Zimbabwe

== Officials ==
The officials selected are:

UAP

Marielouw Van der Merwe

Chris Campbell

Umpires

Leonard Masao

Chakatsa Lephole

Boikhutso Tuelo

Theophilus Moletsane

Tharina Opperman

Adrian Abrahams

== Round Robin ==
Pos	Team	Pld	W	D	L	GF	GA	GD	Pts
1	South Africa	3	3	0	0	141	99	+42	6
2	Zimbabwe	3	2	0	1	109	106	+3	4
3	Kenya	3	1	0	2	101	115	-14	2
4	Botswana	3	0	0	3	105	133	−31	0

Match day 1

Botswana	35-53	South Africa

Kenya	29-37	Zimbabwe

Match day 2

Botswana	31-38	Zimbabwe

South Africa	42-30	Kenya

Match day 3

Botswana	36-42	Kenya

Zimbabwe	34-46	South Africa

== Playoffs ==
=== 3rd/4th playoff ===
Kenya	46-27	Botswana

=== Final ===
Zimbabwe	40-45	South Africa

== Final standings ==
Rank	Team
1	South Africa
2	Zimbabwe
3	Kenya
4	Botswana
