= Dan Ryan (netball) =

Australian netball player and coach (born 1984)

Personal information
- Full name: Dan Ryan
- Born: 1984 (age 41–42) Melbourne, Victoria, Australia
- University: RMIT University

Netball career
- Playing positions: GA, GS
Years	Club team	Apps
2000–2016	Victorian Cyclones	
2019–	Knights	
Years	National team	Caps
2003–2016	Australia Men	
Coaching career
- Years: Team
- 2003–2006: Corio
- 2013: Southern Force
- 2015–2016: Manchester Thunder
- 2016–2018: Adelaide Thunderbirds
- 2018–2021: Northern Ireland
- 2019–2021: Leeds Rhinos
- 2022–: West Coast Fever

Dan Ryan is an Australian netball player, coach, sports journalist and broadcaster. He is currently the head coach of the West Coast Fever in the Australian Suncorp Super Netball competition.

He was head coach of Manchester Thunder during the 2016 Netball Superleague season when they finished top of the table during the regular season and runners up in the grand final. He was subsequently head coach of Adelaide Thunderbirds for the 2017 and 2018 seasons. He was an assistant coach when Thunderbirds won the 2013 ANZ Championship and when Manchester Thunder won the 2019 Netball Superleague title. As a player, Ryan captained both the Victorian Cyclones and Australia Men. As a sports journalist and broadcaster, Ryan has worked for various organisations, including Network 10 and Sky Sports.

== Early life, family and education ==
Ryan was raised in the Little River, Corio and Geelong areas of Victoria, Australia. He was one of four brothers. He was first inspired to play netball by his mother who played in local leagues. In 1992, at the age of 8, he began playing in Corio Netball Association competitions, initially in girls-only leagues. When he was 12 the association introduced mixed competitions. Between 2007 and 2011, Ryan attended RMIT University where he studied Communications and Journalism.

== Playing career ==
At the age of 14, Ryan was selected to play for the Victorian Cyclones men's under-19 team and at 15 was playing for the senior team. In 2003, aged 18, he made his senior debut for the Australia Men. Ryan went on to captain both the senior Victorian Cyclones and Australia Men's teams. While still an active player, Ryan also began coaching. Between 2003 and 2006 he coached the senior netball team at Corio Community Sports Club While working in England, Ryan played for the Knights, a men's netball team. He made his Knights debut at the 2020 Big Showdown.

== Sports Broadcaster ==
As a sports journalist and broadcaster, Ryan has worked for various organisations, including Network 10 and Sky Sports.

Years	Organisation	Role
2008	Geelong Advertiser	Netball correspondent
2007–2008	Seven Network	Junior reporter for Seven News Melbourne
2009–2012	Network 10	Worked as an ANZ Championship commentator. Served as a commentator and reporter at both the gymnastics and netball at the 2010 Commonwealth Games
2010	Sky Sports	Commentator at 2010 World Netball Series
2012	Fox Sports	Constellation Cup and Quad Series commentator
2012–2013	Tennis Australia	Presenter, commentator, scriptwriter. Worked on Australian Open coverage.
2014	Sky News Australia	Sports presenter/reporter
2019–	Sky Sports	Netball pundit at the 2019 Netball World Cup

== Coaching career ==
=== Adelaide Thunderbirds ===
Between 2012 and 2015, Ryan served an assistant coach at Adelaide Thunderbirds. In late 2011 he was approached by Thunderbirds head coach, Jane Woodlands-Thompson, and offered the job. He was subsequently a member of the Thunderbirds coaching staff when they won the 2013 ANZ Championship. In 2013, while with Thunderbirds, Ryan also served as head coach for their Australian Netball League affiliate, Southern Force. After a season away with Manchester Thunder, Ryan returned to Thunderbirds and served as head coach for the 2017 and 2018 seasons.

=== Manchester Thunder ===
In 2015 Ryan was appointed head coach of Manchester Thunder. During the 2016 Netball Superleague season he guided Thunder as they finished top of the table during the regular season and runners up in the grand final. He left Thunder to return to Adelaide Thunderbirds as head coach. Ryan re-joined Thunder for the 2019 season and served as an assistant coach to Karen Greig as Thunder won the title.

=== Northern Ireland ===
In November 2018 Ryan was appointed head coach of Northern Ireland. Ryan subsequently coached Northern Ireland at the 2019 Netball World Cup. In August 2019 it was announced that Ryan would continue to serve as Northern Ireland's head coach.

Ryan stepped down from the role in April 2021.

Tournaments	Place
2019 Netball World Cup	10th
2019 Netball Europe Open Championships	3rd place, bronze medalist(s)

=== Leeds Rhinos ===
It August 2019 Ryan was appointed head coach of Leeds Rhinos as part of their preparations for joining the Netball Superleague in 2021.

Ryan left the Rhinos after the 2021 Netball Superleague season in which the club qualified for the finals series in fourth place, to return to Australia.

=== West Coast Fever ===
Ryan was appointed head coach of the West Coast Fever upon his return to Australia in September 2021. Ryan replaced incoming Australia Diamonds coach Stacey Marinkovich.

In his first season, Ryan would lead the Fever to the club's first Suncorp Super Netball premiership, with the team defeating Melbourne Vixens 70–59.

== Honours ==
=== Head coach ===
Manchester Thunder

- Netball Superleague
  - Runners up: 2016

West Coast Fever

- Suncorp Super Netball
  - Premiers: 2022
