= Fast5 Netball at the 2023 Commonwealth Youth Games =

International Fast5 tournament hosted by Trinidad and Tobago

Tournament details
- Host country: Trinidad and Tobago
- Cities: Scarborough, Tobago
- Venue: Shaw Park Cultural Complex
- Dates: 8–10 August 2023
- Teams: 8
- TV partner: Commonwealth Sport/YouTube

Final positions
- Champions: Australia (1st title)
- Runners-up: South Africa
- Third place: England

Tournament statistics
- Matches played: 20

Fast5 Netball at the 2023 Commonwealth Youth Games was the inaugural Fast5 netball tournament at the Commonwealth Youth Games. Eight teams, including the hosts Trinidad and Tobago, featured in a series of matches played in August 2023, at Scarborough's Shaw Park Cultural Complex. With a team captained by Monika 'Otai, Australia won the tournament after defeating South Africa 35–23 in the gold medal match. England finished the tournament in third place after defeating Scotland 34–29 in the bronze medal match. The series was live streamed on Commonwealth Sport's YouTube channel.

== Group A ==
=== Squads ===
Participating teams and rosters
Australia	Canada	Scotland	Trinidad and Tobago
Nicola Barge; Georgie Cleaver; Jada Delaney; Sasha-May Flegler; Gemma Hutchings; Mia Lavis; Monika 'Otai (c); Tabitha Packer; Lucy Voyvodic; Clara Wigley	Katharine Doerksen; Holly Hancock; Nyomi Khau; Jaya Kaur Kooner; Abigail McLean; Hannah McLean; Pearl Mehta; Loliyo Pione; Ella Ricketts; Janelle Yang (c)	Libby Clark; Heidi Dawson; Alexia Gillies; Phoebe Haynes; Eva Howitt; Beth Logan; Becca McKelvie; Amelie Smith; Niamh Trainer; McKenna Wilkinson	Shania Abraham; Eboni Castle; Amara Edghill (c); Treasure Garcia; Nichola Gill; Jelissa Goodridge; Jada Hamilton; Kayla Julien; Akeira Pompey; Victoria Taylor
Head Coach:	Head Coach:	Head Coach: Hayley MacKellar	Head Coach: Kyla Keith-Wilson
Assistant coach:	Assistant coach:	Assistant coach: Rachel Cremin	Assistant coach: Sojourner Hyles-Lewis

=== Round 1 ===
8 August 2023	Australia	29–8	Scotland
17:15	Georgie Cleaver; Monika Otai; Nicola Barge	Stats	Libby Clark

8 August 2023	Trinidad and Tobago	11–22	Canada
18:15	Shania Abraham; Amara Edghill; Jelissa Goodridge; Kayla Julien	Report; Stats	Janelle Yang; Nyomi Khau

=== Round 2 ===
8 August 2023	Australia	54–6	Canada
22:15	Georgie Cleaver; Monika Otai; Nicola Barge; Mia Lavis	Stats	Pearl Mehta

8 August 2023	Trinidad and Tobago	14–37	Scotland
23:15	Jelissa Goodridge	Stats	Alexia Gillies; Beth Logan; Heidi Dawson; Niamh Trainer

=== Round 3 ===
9 August 2023	Scotland	24–4	Canada
17:15	Heidi Dawson; Niamh Trainer; Libby Clark	Stats	Janelle Yang; Nyomi Khau

9 August 2023	Trinidad and Tobago	2–64	Australia
18:15		Stats	Georgie Cleaver; Monika Otai; Nicola Barge

=== Table ===
Pos	Team	P	W	D	L	GF	GA	GD	Pts
1	Australia	3	3	0	0	147	16	+131	6
2	Scotland	3	2	0	1	69	47	+22	4
3	Canada	3	1	0	2	32	89	-57	2
4	Trinidad and Tobago	3	0	0	3	27	123	-96	0

Qualified for Semi-final 1
Qualified for Semi-final 2
Qualified for 5th/8th playoffs

== Group B ==
=== Squads ===
Participating teams and rosters
Botswana	England	Saint Vincent and the Grenadines	South Africa
Zandile Mchive; Letso Mohinda; Lone Mohinda; Katlego Morapedi; Joy Mothelesi; Kamogelo Ngwaga; Goitsemodimo Oaitse; Keneilwe Sheleng	Sophie Egbaran; Darcie Everitt (c); Victoria Fisher; Isabelle Kaye; Isabella Phillips; Emily Pawlett; Regan Peters; Eleanor Sadler; Anya Williams; Ella Williams (vc)	Skye Baptiste; Jada Berkley; Ketonna Campbell; Jamirah Coombs; Jamarah Coombs; Deonica Creese; Kayla Miller; Vatesha Pompey; Zuandra Richards; Giada Small	Kubura Abubakar; Jade Atkins; Ametisse Bandu; Maria Du Raan; Thato Legodi; Zahrah Noah; Luane Smith; Kiara Van Eeden; Karla Victor; Amone Wessels
Head Coach:	Head Coach: Sheonah Forbes	Head Coach: Nicole Sandy–Stevenson	Head Coach: Emily Mathosa
Assistant coach:	Assistant coach: Leah Setsoafia	Assistant coach:	Team Manager: Jenny van Dyk

=== Round 1 ===
8 August 2023	South Africa	40–30	England
19:15	Jade Atkins; Maria Du Raan; Luane Smith	Stats	Sophie Egbaran; Ella Williams; Anya Williams

8 August 2023	Botswana	18–16	Saint Vincent and the Grenadines
20:15	Goitsemodimo Oaitse; Kamogelo Ngwaga	Stats	Jamarah Coombs; Kayla Miller; Vatesha Pompey; Giada Small

=== Round 2 ===
8 August 2023	England	42–14	Saint Vincent and the Grenadines
00:15	Sophie Egbaran; Eleanor Sadler; Anya Williams	Stats	Jamarah Coombs; Kayla Miller; Vatesha Pompey; Giada Small

8 August 2023	South Africa	58–3	Botswana
01:15	Kubura Abubakar; Maria Du Raan; Luane Smith; Amone Wessels	Stats	Goitsemodimo Oaitse 2/2 (100%); Kamogelo Ngwaga 1/1 (100%)

=== Round 3 ===
9 August 2023	South Africa	72–8	Saint Vincent and the Grenadines
19:15	Kubura Abubakar; Maria Du Raan; Luane Smith; Amone Wessels	Stats	Jamarah Coombs; Kayla Miller

9 August 2023	England	47–8	Botswana
20:15	Sophie Egbaran; Ella Williams; Anya Williams; Regan Peters	Stats	Goitsemodimo Oaitse

=== Table ===
Pos	Team	P	W	D	L	GF	GA	GD	Pts
1	South Africa	3	3	0	0	170	41	+129	6
2	England	3	2	0	1	119	62	+57	4
3	Botswana	3	1	0	2	29	121	-92	2
4	Saint Vincent and the Grenadines	3	0	0	3	38	132	-94	0

Qualified for Semi-final 1
Qualified for Semi-final 2
Qualified for 5th/8th playoffs

== Classification ==
=== 5th/8th playoffs ===
9 August 2023	Canada	25–11	Saint Vincent and the Grenadines
22:15	Pearl Mehta; Nyomi Khau	Stats	Jamarah Coombs 7/12 (58%); Kayla Miller 4/5 (80%)

9 August 2023	Trinidad and Tobago	11–15	Botswana
23:15	Shania Abraham; Jelissa Goodridge	Stats	Goitsemodimo Oaitse; Kamogelo Ngwaga; Zandile Mchive

=== 7th/8th playoff ===
10 August 2023	Trinidad and Tobago	25–13	Saint Vincent and the Grenadines
19:15	Shania Abraham; Jelissa Goodridge	Stats	Jamarah Coombs; Kayla Miller

=== 5th/6th playoff ===
10 August 2023	Botswana	17–13	Canada
20:15	Goitsemodimo Oaitse; Kamogelo Ngwaga	Stats	Pearl Mehta; Nyomi Khau

== Medal competition ==
=== Semi-final 1 ===
9 August 2023	Australia	44–25	England
00:15	Georgie Cleaver; Monika Otai; Nicola Barge; Mia Lavis	Stats	Sophie Egbaran; Regan Peters

=== Semi-final 2 ===
9 August 2023	South Africa	51–20	Scotland
01:15	Kubura Abubakar; Maria Du Raan; Luane Smith	Stats	Niamh Trainer; Libby Clark

=== Bronze Medal Match ===
10 August 2023	England	34–29	Scotland
21:15	Sophie Egbaran; Ella Williams; Anya Williams; Regan Peters	Stats	Niamh Trainer; Libby Clark

=== Gold Medal Match ===
10 August 2023	Australia	39–29	South Africa
22:15	Georgie Cleaver; Monika Otai; Nicola Barge; Mia Lavis	Stats	Maria Du Raan; Luane Smith

== Final Placings ==
Rank	Team
1st place, gold medalist(s)	Australia
2nd place, silver medalist(s)	South Africa
3rd place, bronze medalist(s)	England
4	Scotland
5	Botswana
6	Canada
7	Trinidad and Tobago
8	Saint Vincent and the Grenadines
