= New Zealand men's national netball team =

Men's national netball team

New Zealand
- National federation: New Zealand Men's and Mixed Netball Association
- Coach: Denins Napara
- Nickname: Net Blacks
First	Second

The New Zealand men's national netball team, nicknamed the Net Blacks and also referred to as New Zealand Men or Aotearoa Men, represents the New Zealand Men's and Mixed Netball Association in international men's netball competitions, including the Trans-Tasman Cup, played against Australia, and the Men's Fast5 Netball World Series. During the 2020s, Trans-Tasman Cup matches have acted a curtain raisers for Constellation Cup matches, while the Men's Fast5 Netball World Series' have been played alongside the women's series. New Zealand Men have also played in the Cadbury Netball Series against New Zealand Women and other women's and mixed teams.

== Early matches, tournaments ==
Since 1985, New Zealand and Australia Men have played each other in a Trans Tasman series. The series has featured both open and under-23 tournaments. In 2002 the Australian International Men's and Mixed Netball Association began organising its own Australian Championships for men's and mixed teams. The 2003 Australian Championships saw New Zealand entering a team in the Open Mens Division and going on to win the title. New Zealand also entered a team in 2004.

== Tournament history ==
=== Cadbury Netball Series ===
As part of their preparations for the 2019 Netball World Cup, Noeline Taurua, head coach of the New Zealand Women, arranged for her team to play in the 2019 Cadbury Netball Series. This series featured a New Zealand men's invitational team, Fiji Women and an ANZ Premiership All Stars select. The New Zealand Men had previously trained with and played against the New Zealand Women behind closed doors. However, this series saw the men's team make their television debut. On 26 June 2019, the New Zealand men's invitational team defeated Fiji Women 93–19 in their opening match of the series. On 26 June 2019, New Zealand Men defeated New Zealand Women 54–50. This was the first match between the two teams that was broadcast live. On 29 June 2019, the men's team won the 2019 series when they defeated the New Zealand Women 66–54 in the final. New Zealand Women subsequently won two similar series in 2020 and 2021. Ahead of the 2022 Commonwealth Games, New Zealand Women again played New Zealand Men as part of their preparations. New Zealand Men subsequently won the series for a second time.

Tournaments	Place
2019 Cadbury Netball Series	1st
2020 Cadbury Netball Series	2nd
2021 Cadbury Netball Series	2nd
2022 Cadbury Netball Series	1st

=== Trans-Tasman Cup ===
Since 1985, New Zealand Men and Australia Men had played each other in a Trans Tasman series. In the 2020s, on the back of the successful Cadbury Netball Series, these matches began to be televised. The 2022 Trans-Tasman Cup series acted as a curtain raiser for the 2022 Constellation Cup. On 12 October 2022, at Auckland's Spark Arena, Australia Men defeated New Zealand Men 64–48 in the first men's televised Trans-Tasman match.

Tournaments	Place
2018 Trans-Tasman Cup	2nd
2022 Trans-Tasman Cup	2nd
2023 Trans-Tasman Cup	2nd
2024 Trans-Tasman Cup	2nd

=== Men's Fast5 Netball World Series ===
Since 2022, New Zealand Men have played in the Men's Fast5 Netball World Series. New Zealand won the inaugural series after defeating Australia 29–25 in the final.

Tournaments	Place
2022 Men's Fast5 Netball World Series	1st
2023 Men's Fast5 Netball World Series	1st
2024 Men's Fast5 Netball World Series	2nd

== Notable players ==
=== Captains ===
	Year
Matt Wetere	2019
Kruze Tangira	20xx–2024
Junior Levi	2023
Jaz Simpson	2025

== Head coaches ==
Coach	Years
David Pala'amo	2019 ^{(Note 1)}
Sarah Michelle Hansen-Vaeau	2019 ^{(Note 1)}
Tania Anderson	2020 ^{(Note 2)}
Natalie Milicich	2020 ^{(Note 2)}
Dion Te Whetu	2022
Helene Wilson	2024
Dennis Napara	2025

Notes

- ^1 Pala'amo and Hansen-Vaeau were co-coaches
- ^2 Anderson and Milicich were co-coaches
