= Netball in Kenya =

Women's ball game

- Country: Kenya
- National team: Kenya

Netball in Kenya is primarily played by girls. The Kenya Netball Association changed its name to its current one in 1966, and became the first African nation to join the International Federation of Netball Associations. Club netball is played in the country. The national team has qualified for the Commonwealth Games.

== Participation ==
In Kenya, netball is primarily played by women, and primarily played in rural areas. A school sought to build four netball courts at their school in 1950. Some girls played netball after school during the 1980s. Netball programs were being run by schools in the late 1990s though there were few opportunities for adult players after they completed school.

== Governance ==
In 1966, the Kenya Inter-racial Netball and Rounders Association changes its name to the Kenya Netball Association. Kenya was the first African country to become an affiliate of International Federation of Netball Associations. In 1976, Anne Stephenson of the All England Netball Association went to Kenya to train umpires there.

== Clubs ==
In 1985, Kenya sent a team to Tanzania to participate in the East and Central African Cup, a competition for club teams. Kenya Breweries lost to the Zambian Zesco Ndola 45–47. In 1986, the Kenya Meat Commission Netball Club was registered.

== National team ==
During the 10th All African Games, half of the 28 players who traveled to compete were men for an alleged men's netball competition that never took place. The Kenya National Assembly looked into this situation are part of broader travel funding issues. The Kenyan women's team earned a bronze medal at the Games. Kenya participated in the Iringa, Tanzania hosted November 1976 East and Central African Senior Challenge Cup. Kenya hosted the event in 1983 where they drew 28–28 in their game against Zambia. In 1995, the Kenyans lost to Zambia at the same competition by a score of 42-47 and went on to finish second to Kenya at the tournament.

In 1997, the team qualified to play in the Commonwealth Games.
