= 2022 Australia England netball series =

Three-match netball series

Tournament details
- Host country: Australia
- Dates: 26 October–3 November 2022

Final positions
- Champions: Australia
- Runners-up: England

Tournament statistics
- Matches played: 3
- Top scorer(s): Eleanor Cardwell; 122/133 (92%)

The 2022 Australia England netball series saw Australia host England in October 2022 for a three-match series. The series had been originally scheduled for October 2021, but was cancelled due to the COVID-19 pandemic.

Australia won the series 3–0, after winning the first match with a thrilling one goal victory in Newcastle.

== Squads ==
Australia			England		
Name	Team	Position	Name	Team	Position
Stacey Marinkovich	Nil	Coach	Jess Thirlby	Nil	Coach
Kiera Austin	Melbourne Vixens	WA, GA, GS	Imogen Allison	Team Bath	WD, C
Courtney Bruce (vc)	West Coast Fever	GK	Eleanor Cardwell	Adelaide Thunderbirds	GA, GS
Gretel Bueta	Queensland Firebirds	GA	Jade Clarke	London Pulse	C, WD
Sophie Dwyer	Giants Netball	GS, GA	Beth Cobden	Loughborough Lightning	WD, C
Sophie Garbin	Collingwood Magpies	GS, GA	Sophie Drakeford-Lewis	Surrey Storm	GA, WA
Paige Hadley (c)	New South Wales Swifts	C, WA, WD	Funmi Fadoju	London Pulse	GD, GK, WD
Sarah Klau	New South Wales Swifts	GK, GD	Layla Guscoth	Surrey Storm	GD GK
Cara Koenen	Sunshine Coast Lightning	GS, GA	Jo Harten	Giants Netball	GS, GA
Kate Moloney	Melbourne Vixens	C, WD	Alice Harvey	Loughborough Lightning	GK, GD
Amy Parmenter	Giants Netball	WD, C	Helen Housby	New South Wales Swifts	GA, GS
Jamie-Lee Price	Giants Netball	C, WD	Hannah Joseph	Loughborough Lightning	WA, C
Maddy Proud	New South Wales Swifts	C, WA	Laura Malcolm	Mainland Tactix	WD, C, WA
Maddy Turner	New South Wales Swifts	GD, WD	Geva Mentor	Collingwood Magpies	GK, GD
Donnell Wallam	Queensland Firebirds	GS	Natalie Metcalf	Manchester Thunder	WA, GA
Joanna Weston	Melbourne Vixens	GD, GK, WD	Olivia Tchine	London Pulse	GS, GA
			Francesca Williams	Loughborough Lightning	GD, GK

Notes

- ^1 Gretel Bueta withdrew from the squad on 4 October 2022 after announcing her pregnancy
- ^2 Joanna Weston was added to the squad on 18 October 2022 due to injury to Sunday Aryang.

== Match officials ==
=== Umpires ===
Umpire	Association
Kristie Simpson	New Zealand
Angela Armstrong-Lush	New Zealand
Gareth Fowler	New Zealand

=== Umpire Appointments Panel ===
Umpire	Association
Sharon Kelly	Australia
Michelle Phippard	England

== Matches ==
=== First Test ===
26 October 2022; 7:30 pm AEDT (UTC+11:00)	Report; Stats	Australia	55–54	England	Newcastle Entertainment Centre, Newcastle	Foxtel (Aus) & Sky Sports (UK)
26 October 2022; 7:30 pm AEDT (UTC+11:00)	Report; Stats	Scoring by quarter: 14–14, 12–13, 16–12, 13–15			Newcastle Entertainment Centre, Newcastle	Foxtel (Aus) & Sky Sports (UK)
26 October 2022; 7:30 pm AEDT (UTC+11:00)	Report; Stats	Garbin 36/43 (84%); Wallam 8/8 (100%); Austin 8/10 (80%); Koenen 3/3 (100%)		Cardwell 44/48 (92%); Housby 7/8 (88%); Drakeford-Lewis 3/3 (100%)	Newcastle Entertainment Centre, Newcastle	Foxtel (Aus) & Sky Sports (UK)

=== Second Test ===
30 October 2022; 7:30 pm AEDT (UTC+11:00)	Report; Stats	Australia	56–48	England	Qudos Bank Arena, Sydney; Attendance: 14,117	Foxtel (Aus) & Sky Sports (UK)
30 October 2022; 7:30 pm AEDT (UTC+11:00)	Report; Stats	Scoring by quarter: 16–11, 12–13, 14–10, 14–14			Qudos Bank Arena, Sydney; Attendance: 14,117	Foxtel (Aus) & Sky Sports (UK)
30 October 2022; 7:30 pm AEDT (UTC+11:00)	Report; Stats	Koenen 29/31 (94%); Austin 22/24 (92%); Dwyer 5/6 (83%)		Cardwell 40/45 (89%); Housby 8/10 (80%)	Qudos Bank Arena, Sydney; Attendance: 14,117	Foxtel (Aus) & Sky Sports (UK)

=== Third Test ===
3 November 2022; 6:30 pm AEST (UTC+10:00)	Report; Stats	Australia	57–53	England	Brisbane Entertainment Centre, Brisbane; Attendance: 8,556	Foxtel (Aus) & Sky Sports (UK)
3 November 2022; 6:30 pm AEST (UTC+10:00)	Report; Stats	Scoring by quarter: 19–11, 13–13, 11–14, 14–15			Brisbane Entertainment Centre, Brisbane; Attendance: 8,556	Foxtel (Aus) & Sky Sports (UK)
3 November 2022; 6:30 pm AEST (UTC+10:00)	Report; Stats	Wallam 25/26 (96%); Garbin 14/18 (78%); Dwyer 9/10 (90%); Austin 9/11 (82%)		Cardwell 38/40 (95%); Drakeford-Lewis 12/13 (92%); Housby 3/4 (75%)	Brisbane Entertainment Centre, Brisbane; Attendance: 8,556	Foxtel (Aus) & Sky Sports (UK)
3 November 2022; 6:30 pm AEST (UTC+10:00)	Report; Stats	Australia won the series 3–0			Brisbane Entertainment Centre, Brisbane; Attendance: 8,556	Foxtel (Aus) & Sky Sports (UK)
