= Men's netball =

Netball played by men

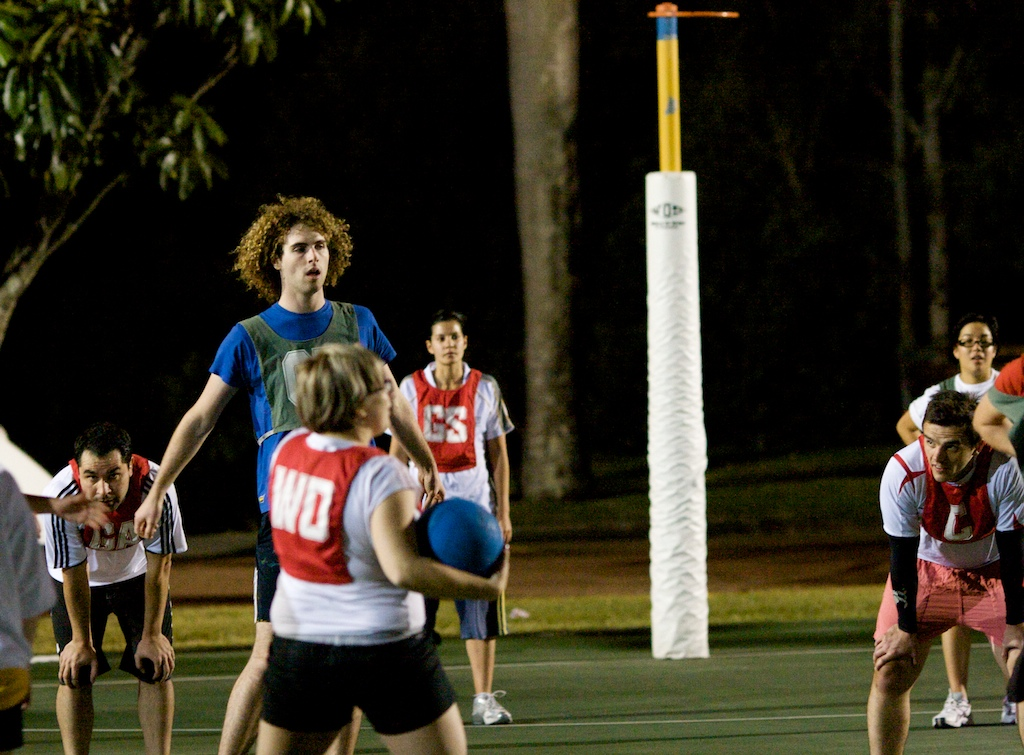
Local mixed netball game in Brisbane, Queensland.

On the club, national and international level, men's netball teams exist, but attract less attention than women's netball. Mixed teams are not uncommon in Australia and are very popular. Men's national teams do exist in Antigua & Barbuda, Australia, Brunei, Canada, England, Fiji, Hong Kong, India, the Isle of Man, Jamaica, Kenya, Malaysia, New Zealand, Pakistan, Papua New Guinea, Singapore, Grenada, St. Vincent & the Grenadines, South Africa, Uganda, the United Arab Emirates, United States, and Zambia.

In 1997, in England male participation constituted 0.7% of the total netball playing population within schools. Unlike women's netball at elite and national levels, men's and mixed gendered teams in countries like Fiji, Australia and New Zealand are largely self-funded. When administrators attend conferences for men's and mixed gendered netball, they also have to pay most of their own costs.

== History ==
Netball started to become popular for male players in Australia during the 1980s as men started to watch the sport that their wives and girlfriends were participating in. In Australia, the sport began to be played with the appearance of mixed gendered social teams. In 1985, the first Australian Championship were held in Geelong. The levels contested included: Open, Open Reserves, 21 and Under, 19 and Under, 17 and Under and Masters.

In 2002 ADF were due to host the AAMNA (All Australian Men's Netball Association) Championships in Townsville, due to costs to other states and deployment of ADF personnel, this championships was cancelled. . In 2002, the South Australians tried to recreate the national organisation under their own state organisation, calling it the Australian International Men's and Mixed Netball Association. The new organisation held its first Australian Championships in 2002 for men's and mixed teams. In 2003, New Zealand entered a national team in the Open Mens Division and won. For a number of years AAMNA (the original) and AIMMNA (supported by SA and WA) had competing championships, with AAMNA rebranding to AMMNA (Australian Men's and Mixed Netball Association) and ultimately out lasting AIMMNA with all states returning to the AMMNA Championships.

In 2004, New Zealand and Fiji sent teams to compete in the Australian Mixed and Men's National Championships. On 6 August 2004, the men's national organisations for Fiji, Cook Islands, New Zealand and Australia attended a meeting where they agreed to form the International Men's and Mixed Netball Association. The following day, the organisation's first official meeting was held. The group decided that the International Men's and Mixed Challenge in August 2006 would be the first event they would organise, and that the event would be held in Fiji.

The 2009 International Challenge Men's and Mixed Netball Tournament was held in the Cook Islands. Currently, World Netball only recognises women's netball.

The 2011 International Challenge Men's and Mixed Netball Tournament was run by the Western Australian Men's and Mixed Netball Association (WAMMNA). It is the major international competition for men's and mixed gendered national netball teams. In the 2011 competition held in April, men's national teams from Samoa, Fiji, Australia, New Zealand and the Cook Islands are a few that will compete.

In 2017 the Australian Championships, held on the Gold Coast, were live streamed for the first time. There were nearly 140,000 viewers around the world who viewed the last 43 matches on the final four days of competition. The first Asian Men's Netball Championship 2016, held in Putrajaya, Malaysia, was live streamed on Facebook. Malaysia won the final over Pakistan in a thrilling match overtime match which Malaysia won by 2 goals, while India beat Brunei to win the bronze medal. Hong Kong finished fifth.

The 2018 Australian Championships was planned to take place at Genea Netball Centre from 1–7 April.

The 2018 Trans-Tasman Cup was to bebe contested between Australia and New Zealand across four divisions (U20, U23, Open Mixed and Open Men's) from 23–28 October at Priceline Stadium in Adelaide.

On 26 June 2019, the New Zealand Men's Netball side competed in their first televised match, beating the Fiji Women 93–19. On 29 June 2019, the men's team won the Cadbury Netball Series against New Zealand Women 66–54, for their first international series win.

In June 2025 World Netball announced the introduction of a men’s netball world cup.

In August 2025, an invitational tournament for national Pacific men's teams was held at Vodafone Arena in Suva, Fiji. The competition was between Fiji, Fiji A, New Zealand and Tonga and ran from the 4th to 8th of August. Fiji won the tournament with a 56-54 victory over the Aotearoa Net Blacks.

== Men's Netball in Australia ==
=== National team ===
- Australia

=== State member organisations ===
- Sunshine State Men's and Mixed Netball Association (QLD)
- Men's Netball NSW (NSW) -
- Victoria Men's and Mixed Netball (VIC)
- South Australia Men's and Mixed Netball (SA)
- West Coast Men's and Mixed Netball Association (WA)
- Tasmania Men's and Mixed Netball Association (TAS)
- Australian Defence Force (ADF)
- Australian Capital Territory Men's Netball (ACT)

=== Victoria Men's and Mixed Netball League (M-League) ===
The Victoria Men's and Mixed Netball Association (VMMNA) run a male and mixed netball league over the summer months. The league is run on Wednesday nights at The State Netball Centre in Parkville, Melbourne. This league also includes Junior M-League for 14&U and 17&U males. A junior league is also run mid year with the same age groups competing.

=== West Australian Netball League ===
Between 2001 and 2004 the West Australian Netball League (WANL) featured a men's netball division. Initially six teams played off, Warriors, Flames, Sparks, Coastals, Bullets and Rangers. Perth Bullets were the inaugural premiers. Coastals won the other three titles. The men's division was relaunched in 2018 featuring four teams – West Coast Warriors, Perth Lions, South East Demons and Wheatbelt Flames. West Coast Warriors would go on to win the first two titles before Roar dominated winning 4 in a row.In 2024 Rangers entered a men’s side in the competition once again followed by Peel Lightning in 2026.

In 2025, West Coast Mens and Mixed Netball Association started Thunder League which provided a boys competition with 14 & Under and 17 & Under divisions. This competition ran after WANL and extends the development pathway for boys netball in Western Australia.

== Men's Netball in England ==
In England, men's and mixed netball is governed by the England Men's and Mixed Netball Association which was formed in 2019. 2020 trials were held for the England men's and mixed national netball squad that were to compete at the now postponed inaugural men's and mixed netball World Cup in Perth Australia. In 2021 the inaugural England Men's & Mixed Netball Association National Championships were held at Nottingham Trent University, with the London Giants winning the men's and mixed national titles. On 30 October 2022, the England Men's national team played their debut international test against Australia Men.

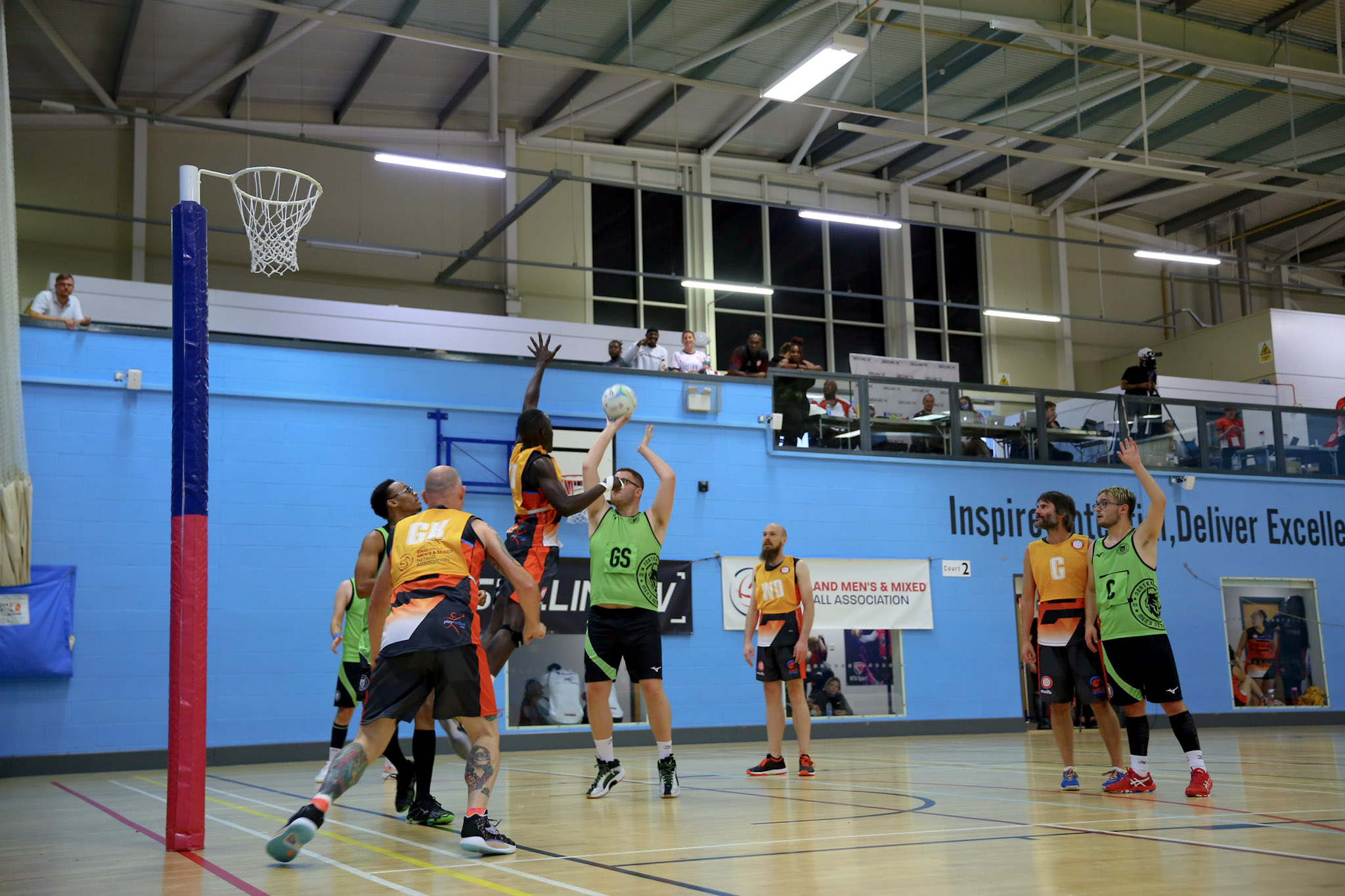
London Giants v Northern Titans at 2021 England Men's & Mixed Netball National Championships

National men's netball teams in England

- London Giants Netball (2021 & 2022 National Champions)
- Knights Mens Netball (2023 National Champions)
- Northern Titans (Leeds)
- Spartans (Manchester)
- Thames Mavericks
- Hawks (South West)
- Nottingham Trent University
- Norfolk United (Norwich)
- North East Men
- Army Men (Aldershot)
- West Cheshire Warriors

National mixed netball teams in England

- London Giants Netball (2021 National Champions)
- Spartans (Manchester)
- Warwick University
- South West Hawks
- Thames Mavericks
- Army Mixed (Aldershot)
- Knights Mixed (2022 & 2023 National Champions)
- West Cheshire Warriors
- Stunts Netball (Loughborough) (2024 National Champions)
- Northants Storm
- Kraken (Worcester)
- Devon Dynamites
- MK Dons
- East Midlands Tornadoes
- Henley Fire
- Thames Mavericks
- Surrey Hurricanes
- Unicorns
- Bandits
- Sheffield Stormers
- Dominoes (Manchester)

== Men's national teams ==
Team	Association
Australia	Australian Men's and Mixed Netball Association
Botswana	
England	England Men's and Mixed Netball Association
Isle of Man	Netball Isle of Man
New Zealand	New Zealand Men's and Mixed Netball Association
Singapore	Singapore Men's and Mixed Netball Association
South Africa	Netball South Africa
Uganda	
Zimbabwe	

== Men's Netball in United Arab Emirates ==
2024 saw the initial introduction of Men’s Netball for the region with the creation of Dubai Oryx in August 2024. Oryx became the first men’s and mixed only netball club in the region. Making history with the first men’s only match in Dec 2024 between Dubai and Abu Dhabi. Since then the club have grown to two men’s teams and have recently been invited to participate in EMMNA Championships in the UK in 2025. Dubai Oryx Men’s debuted at EMMNA Nationals playing their first ever competitive men’s match against Thames Mavericks. Taking the win at 20 -17, Oryx went on to complete a win over NE Viking and Edinburgh Kelpies. Holding strong against a dominant Giants who went on to win the competition. Losing by only 10 goals to Giants. Oryx enjoyed an incredible match up against Manchester Thunder. Oryx met Norfolk United in their ranking final finishing 8th overall.

Off the back of Oryx Nationals Campaign, a Senior Men’s Open Squad was selected to take part in the Singapore Nations Cup in Jan 2026. Co captained by Roel Roberts and Jordan Tewaharau the team navigated their first ever Men’s test series against Australia U20, NZ U21, England A, and Singapore Men’s.
