= List of VFL/AFL and AFL Women's players from the Northern Territory =

This is a list of players from the Northern Territory to have played in the Australian Football League (AFL) and the AFL Women's (AFLW), the two pre-eminent competitions of Australian rules football.

== List of players ==
=== Men's ===
==== AFL players from the NT ====
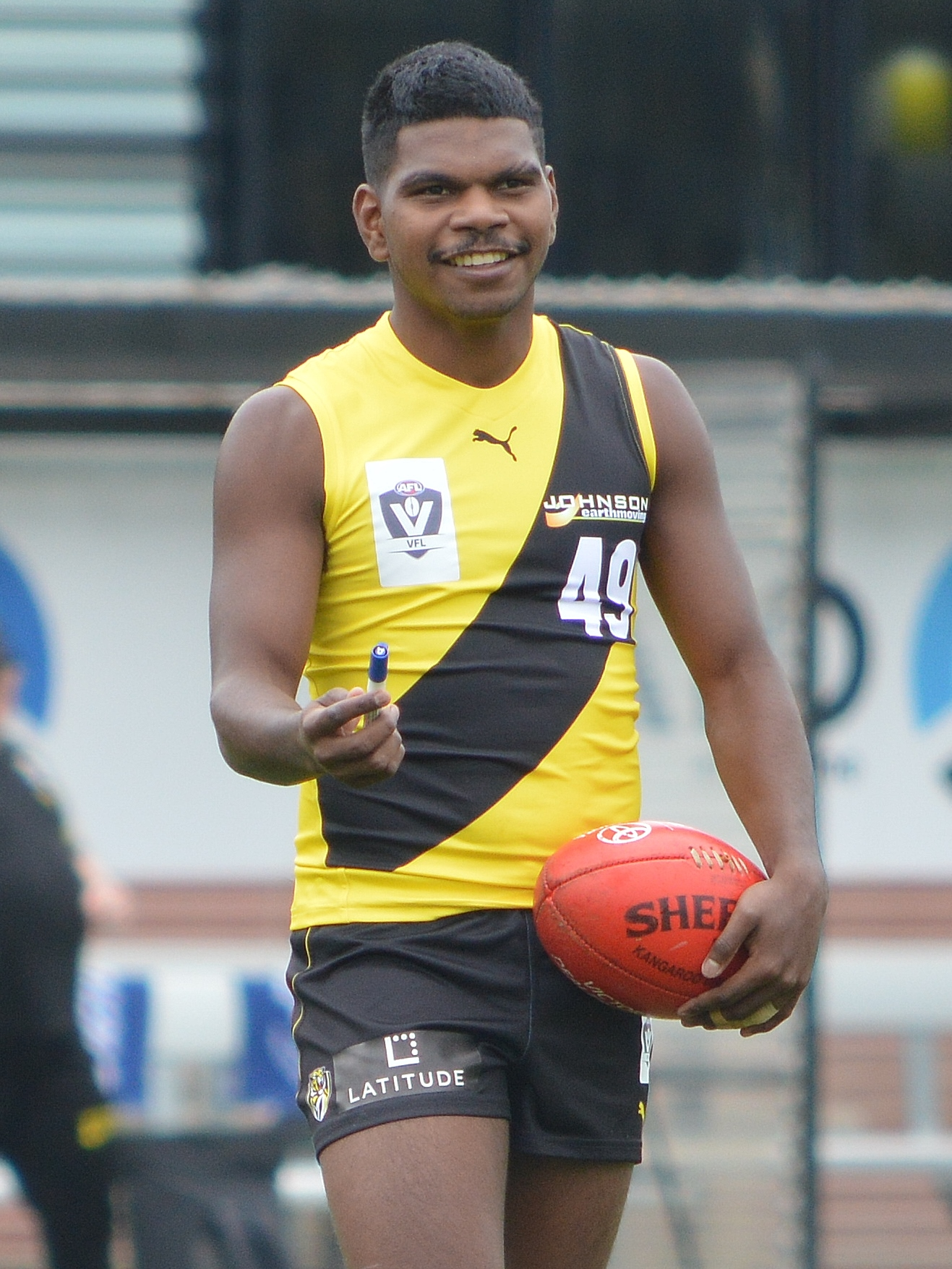
Maurice Rioli Jr is from the Tiwi Islands

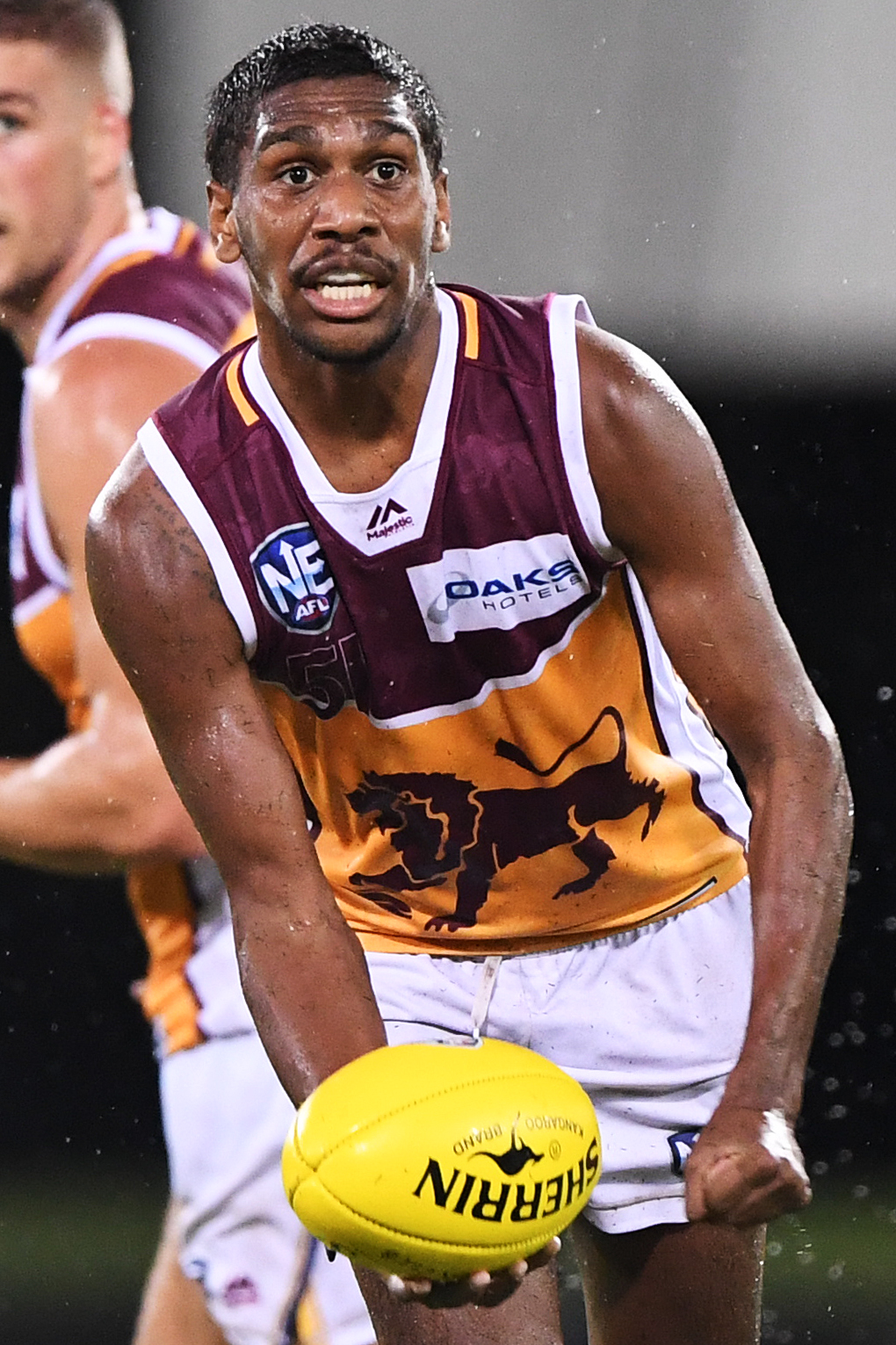
Keidean Coleman was born in Katherine

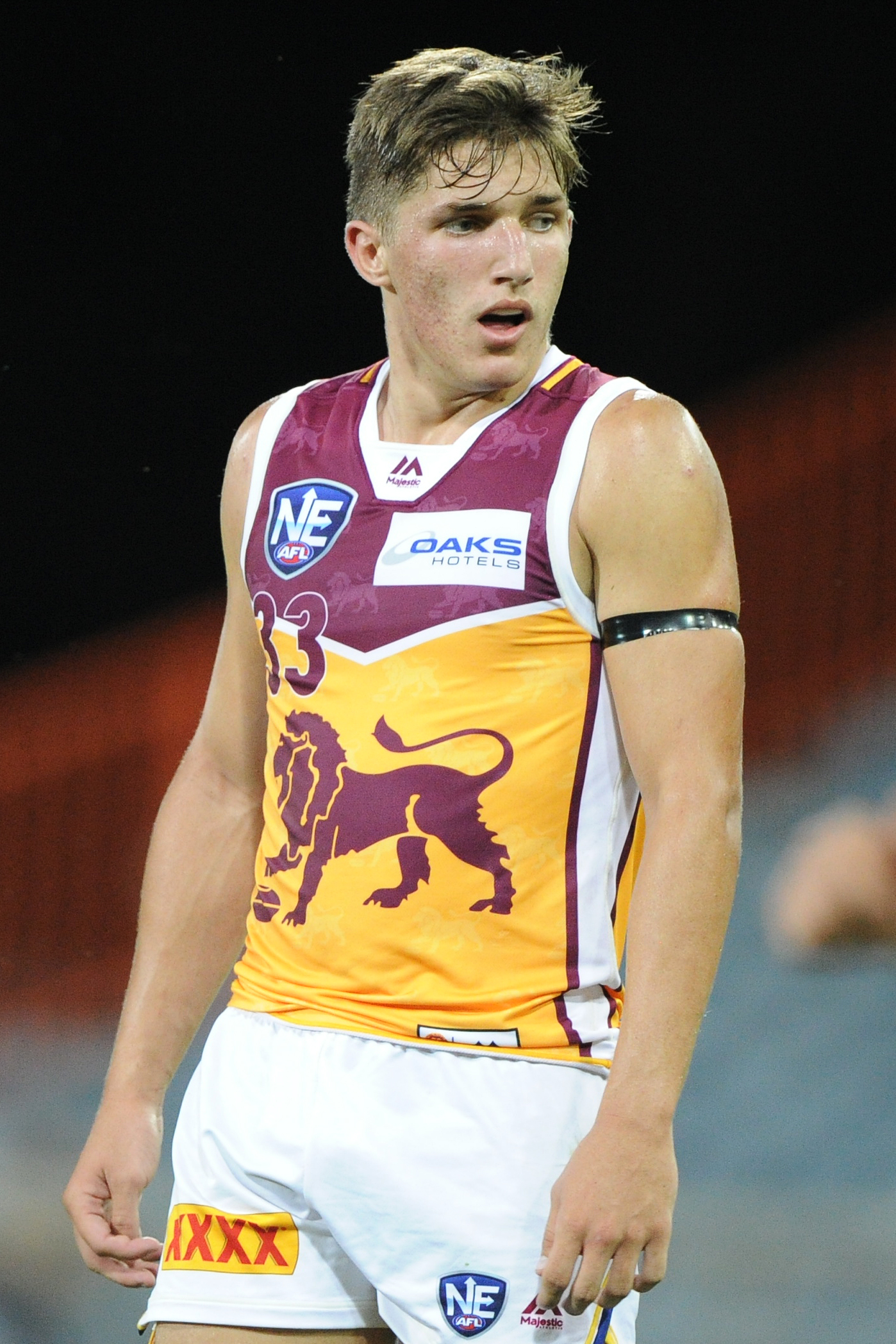
Zac Bailey was raised in Darwin

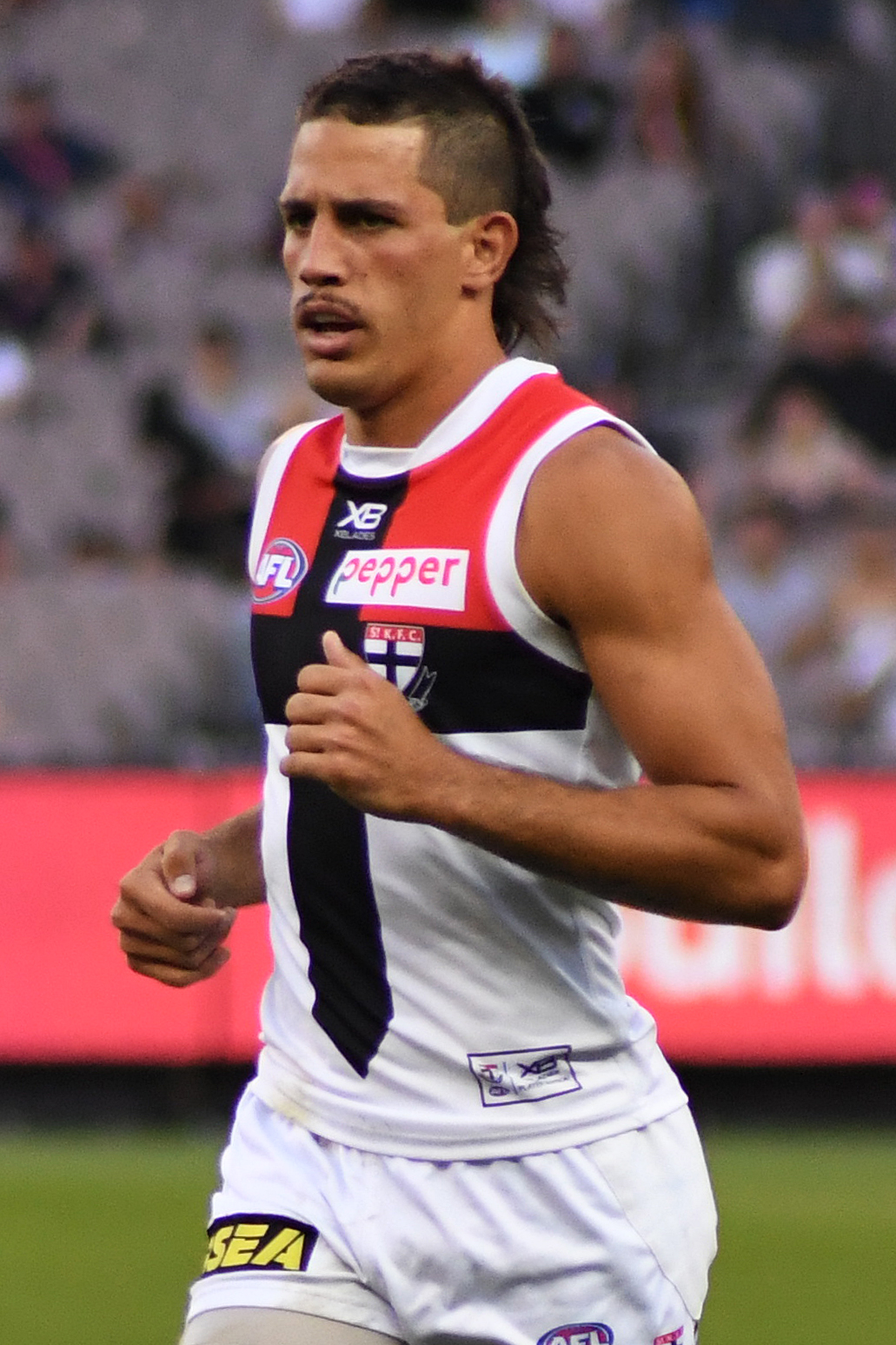
Ben Long is from the Tiwi Islands

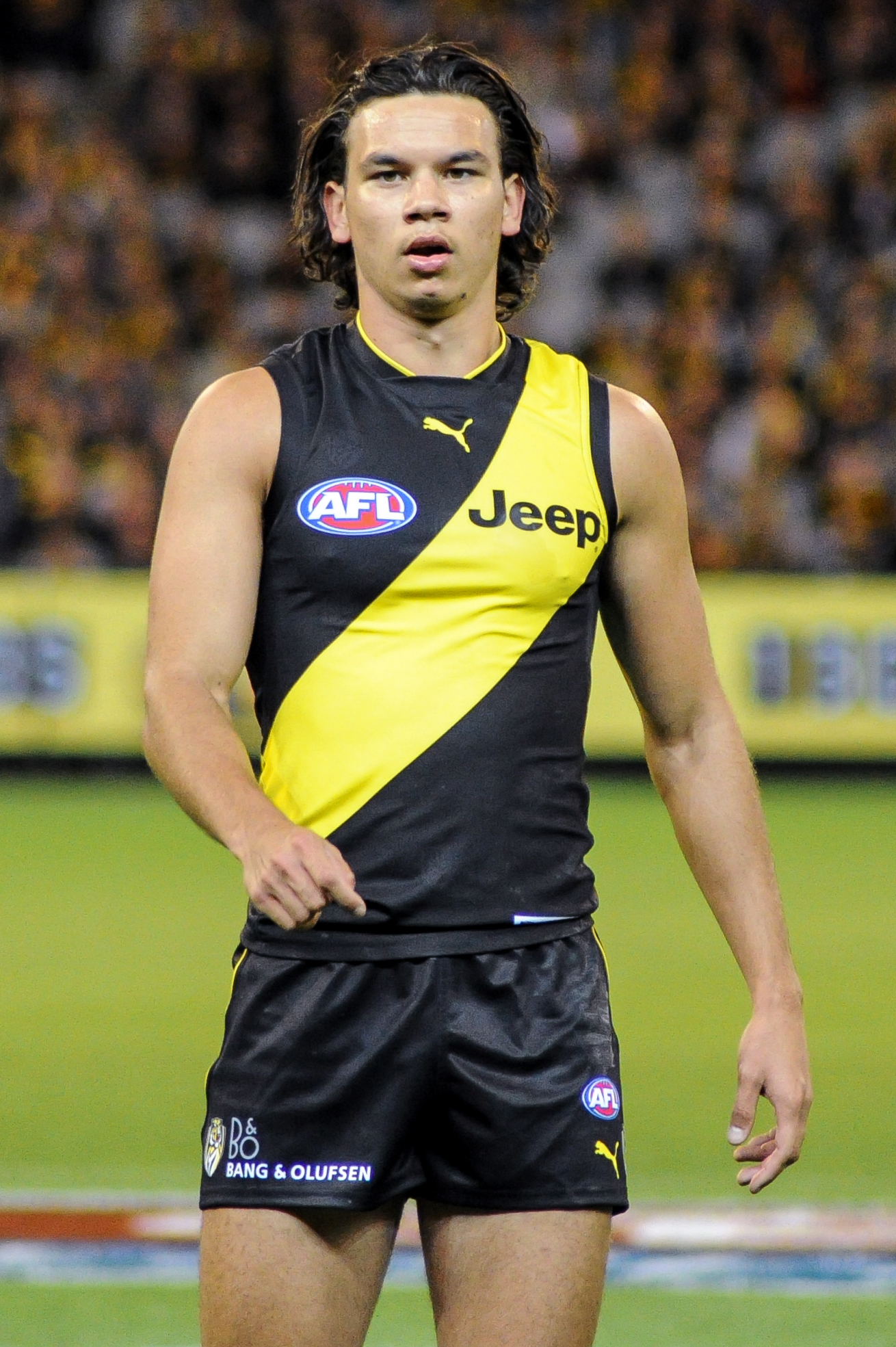
Daniel Rioli is from the Tiwi Islands

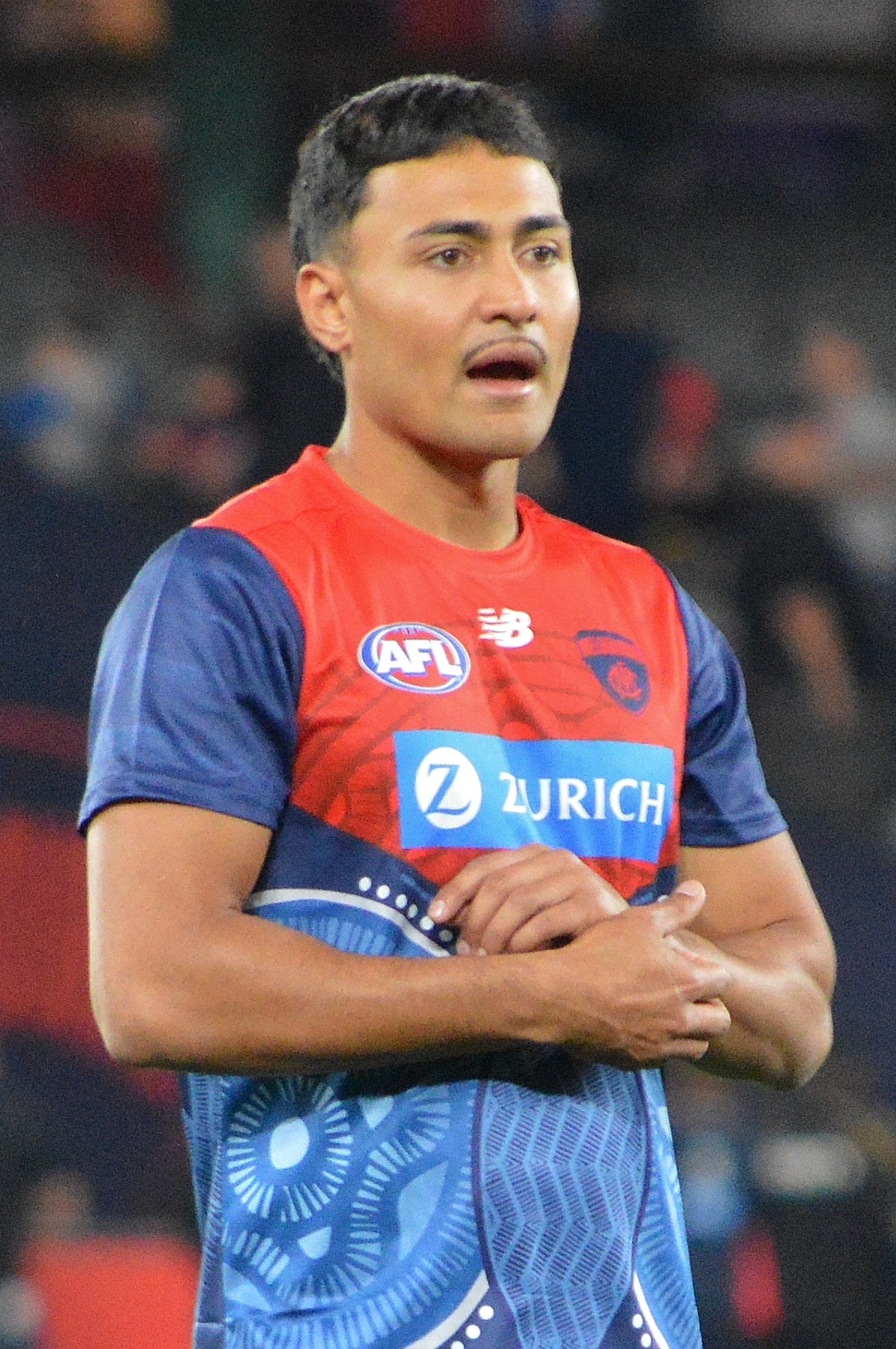
Andy Moniz-Wakefield is from Darwin

Matt Hill is from Katherine

Player	NT junior/senior club/s	Representative honours	AFL years	AFL games	AFL goals	Connections to Northern Territory, notes and references
Matt Hill			2026–	2	2	Born and raised in Katherine (Gajerrong)
Wade Derksen	Nightcliff		2026–	15	0	Raised in Darwin
Sandy Brock	Palmerston, Northern Territory Academy		2025-	20	0	Born and raised in Palmerston
Andy Moniz-Wakefield	Nightcliff, Northern Territory Academy		2024-	8	1	Raised in Darwin
Lloyd Johnston	Wanderers, Northern Territory Academy		2023-2025	9	3	Raised in Borroloola (Yanyuwa, Garrwa)
Jack Peris	Nightcliff, Northern Territory Academy		2023	1	-	Raised in Darwin
Alwyn Davey Jr.	Palmerston, Northern Territory Academy		2023-2025	20	9	Born and raised in Darwin
Jesse Motlop	Wanderers		2022-	63	59	Raised in Darwin (Larrakia)
Maurice Rioli Jr	St Mary's	U16 (2017, 2018), U18 (2019)	2021-	59	32	Raised in Pirlangimpi, Melville Island, Tiwi Islands and Darwin
Joel Jeffrey	Darwin, NT Thunder		2021-	73	28	Born and raised in Darwin (Wulwulam)
Malcolm Rosas Jr	Darwin, NT Thunder		2020-	64	62	Born and raised in Darwin (Ngalakgan, Rembarrnga)
Keidean Coleman	-		2020-	79	16	Born in Katherine, raised in Barunga (Dalabon, Jawoyn)
Sam Walsh	Nightcliff	U12	2019-	156	55	Played junior football
Willie Rioli	-		2018-2025	109	151	Born and raised on Tiwi Islands
Zac Bailey	Southern Districts		2018-	186	215	Raised in Darwin
Brandan Parfitt	Nightcliff, Northern Territory Academy		2017-	95	41	Born and raised in Darwin (Warumungu, Larrakia)
Ben Long	St Mary's, Northern Territory Academy		2017-	156	130	Born in Darwin, raised on Tiwi Islands (Anmatyerr, Malak-Malak and Tiwi)
Ryan Nyhuis	Nightcliff, Northern Territory Academy		2017-2019	17	5	Raised in Darwin
Anthony McDonald-Tipungwuti	Tiwi Bombers	U18 (2011, 2012)	2016-2023	133	157	Born and raised on Tiwi Islands
Daniel Rioli	St Mary's		2016-	223	119	Raised on Tiwi Islands
Jake Long	St Mary's, Northern Territory Academy		2016-2019	5	1	Raised in Darwin (Anmatyerr)
Nakia Cockatoo	Humpty Doo Bombers, Southern Districts, Northern Territory Academy		2015-2023	49	32	Raised at Humpty Doo (Iwaidja, Marrithiyal)
Jake Neade	-	U18 (2012)	2013-2018	66	55	Born and raised in Elliot (Jingili)
Jed Anderson	Northern Territory Academy		2013-2022	99	32	Born and raised in Katherine (Warumungu)
Dom Barry	Federal		2013-2018	10	0	Raised in Alice Springs
Curtly Hampton	Pioneer, NT Thunder		2012-2018	60	12	Raised in Alice Springs and Darwin (NT Zone Selection) (Warlpiri, Arrente)
Shaun Edwards	St Mary's		2012-2017	24	10	Raised in Darwin (Larrakia)
Steven May	Southern Districts	U18 (2010)	2011-2026	251	24	Born and raised in Darwin (Larrakia)
Steven Motlop	Wanderers	U18 (2008)	2011-	212	228	Raised in Darwin (Larrakia)
Liam Patrick	Lajamanu, Wanderers		2011-2013	13	6	Born and raised in Lajamanu
Allen Christensen	St Mary's		2010-2020	133	114	Raised in Darwin
Troy Taylor	South Alice Springs		2010	4	3	Born and raised in Alice Springs
Relton Roberts	Arnhem, Wanderers, NT Thunder		2010	2	0	Born in Ngukurr and raised in Katherine and Darwin
Liam Jurrah	Yuendumu, Nightcliff		2009-2012	36	81	Born and raised in Yuendumu
Cyril Rioli	St Mary's	U16 (2005)	2008-2018	189	275	Born and raised on Tiwi Islands and Darwin
Austin Wonaeamirri	Muluwurri, St Mary's, Tiwi Bombers	U18 (2007)	2008-2011	31	37	Born and raised on Tiwi Islands and Darwin
Marlon Motlop	Wanderers		2008-2011	5	2	Born and raised in Darwin
Cameron Stokes	Darwin		2008-2010	20	8	Raised in Darwin
Alwyn Davey	Palmerston	2000	2007-2013	100	120	Born and raised in Darwin
Nathan Djerrkura	Wanderers	U18 (2006)	2007-2012	25	8	Born and raised in Yirrkala
Matt Campbell	-		2007-2012	82	79	Born and raised in Alice Springs
Malcolm Lynch	-		2007	2	0	Born and raised in the Tiwi Islands
Joe Anderson	Darwin		2007-2010	12	0	Born and raised in Darwin
Mathew Stokes	Palmerston	U16 (2005)	2006-2016	200	209	Born and raised in Darwin (Larrakia)
Richard Tambling	Southern Districts		2005-2013	124	62	Born in Northern Territory, raised in Jabiru and Darwin
Tom Logan	Waratah		2004-2014	117	27	Raised in Darwin
Aaron Davey	Palmerston		2004-2013	178	174	Born and raised in Darwin
Raphael Clarke	St Mary's		2004-2012	86	9	Born in Yirrkala and raised in Darwin
Anthony Corrie	Nightcliff		2004-2010	56	50	Born and raised in Darwin
Jared Brennan	Southern Districts	U18 (2002 c)	2003-2013	173	101	Raised in Darwin
Trent Hentschel	Palmerston		2003-2010	71	94	Raised in Darwin
Jason Roe	Nightcliff		2003-2009	50	7	Born and raised in Darwin
Richard Cole	Pioneer		2002-2007	63	6	Raised in Alice Springs
Xavier Clarke	St Mary's		2002-2011	106	49	Raised in Darwin
Shaun Burgoyne	-		2001-2021	407	302	Born in Darwin (Awarai)
Daniel Motlop	Wanderers		2001-2011	130	208	Born in Darwin
Patrick Bowden	Rovers		2001-2007	75	70	Raised in Alice Springs
Aaron Shattock	Southern Districts		2000-2006	68	16	Raised in Darwin
Matthew Whelan	Darwin		2000-2009	150	15	Born and raised in Darwin
Shannon Rusca	Southern Districts		2000-2002	2	0	Raised in Darwin
Shannon Motlop	Wanderers		1999-2006	64	36	Born and raised on Tiwi Islands and Darwin
Dean Rioli	Waratah		1999-2006	100	91	Born and raised on Tiwi Islands
Fred Campbell	Pioneer		1999-2000	12	7	Raised in Alice Springs
Brad Ottens	-		1998-2011	245	261	Raised in Katherine
Peter Burgoyne	St Mary's	U18 (1995)	1997-2009	240	193	Raised in Darwin
Joel Bowden	West Alice Springs	U18 (1993)	1996-2009	265	171	Raised in Alice Springs
Steven Koops	Southern Districts		1996-2005	89	49	Raised in Darwin
Ronnie Burns	St Mary's		1996-2004	154	262	Raised in Pirlangimpi, Melville Island, Tiwi Islands and Darwin
Mark West	Darwin		1996-1998	16	3	Raised in Darwin
Gary Dhurrkay	Wanderers		1995-2000	72	66	Raised in Darwin
Scott Chisolm	St Mary's		1995-2000	81	33	Raised in Darwin
Andrew Mcleod	Darwin	U18 (1993)	1995-2010	340	275	Born and raised in Darwin and Katherine (Wardaman)
Robert Ahmat	Darwin		1995-2001	67	68	Raised in Darwin
Shawn Lewfatt	Darwin		1995	3	2	Raised in Darwin
Warren Campbell	St Mary's		1994-1995	19	17	Born and raised in Darwin
Lachlan Ross	West Alice Springs		1994	2	1	Raised in Alice Springs
Nathan Buckley	Nightcliff, Southern Districts	U18 (1983, 1984), QLD/NT (1993)	1993-2007	280	284	Raised in Darwin
Adrian McAdam	Southern Districts	NT (c)	1993-1995	36	92	Born and raised in Alice Springs and Darwin
Daryl White	Pioneer	U18 (1990), QLD/NT (1993)	1992-2005	268	165	Born and raised in Alice Springs (Arrernte)
Adam Kerinaiua	North Darwin		1992	3	1	Born and raised on Tiwi Islands
Fabian Francis	Southern Districts	QLD/NT (1993)	1991-2000	109	61	Born and raised in Darwin
Allen Jakovich	Southern Districts		1991-1996	54	208	Lived there, played in NTFL prior to AFL career
Gilbert McAdam	Southern Districts	QLD/NT (1993)	1991-1996	111	89	Born and raised in Alice Springs and Darwin
Matthew Ahmat	Darwin		1991-1994	8	1	Born and raised in Alice Springs and Darwin
Brian Stanislaus	St Mary's		1991	1	0	Born and raised on the Tiwi Islands
Michael Long	St Mary's	1988, QLD/NT (1993)	1989-2001	190	143	Born and raised on Tiwi Islands
Kevin Caton	Darwin	1988	1988-1991	18	18	Raised in Darwin
Bob Jones	Waratah	1988	1988-1989	20	2	Raised in Darwin
Greg McAdam	-		1985	10	13	Born in Alice Springs
Russell Jeffrey	St Mary's, Wanderers	1988	1987-1992	50	4	Raised in Darwin
Michael McLean	Nightcliff	1988, QLD/NT (1993 vc)	1983-1997	184	40	Born and raised in Darwin
Maurice Rioli	St Mary's	1988 (3 caps)	1982-1987	118	80	Born and raised on Tiwi Islands and Darwin
Kelly O'Donnell	Nightcliff	1988	1979-1984	80	67	Lived there
Reuben Cooper	Darwin		1969	2	0	Born and raised in Darwin
Elkin Reilly	-		1962-1966	51	2	Born in Alpurrurulam

=== Women's ===
Without a local AFLW club, the NT government had an investment partnership with Adelaide women's club between 2017 and 2019 and the club played home games in NT. Early in the AFLW many of the women's players started their career in Adelaide with the Adelaide Crows until the introduction of expansion clubs. As such there was a very strong NT influence in the early years of the Adelaide women's side.

==== AFLW players from the NT ====
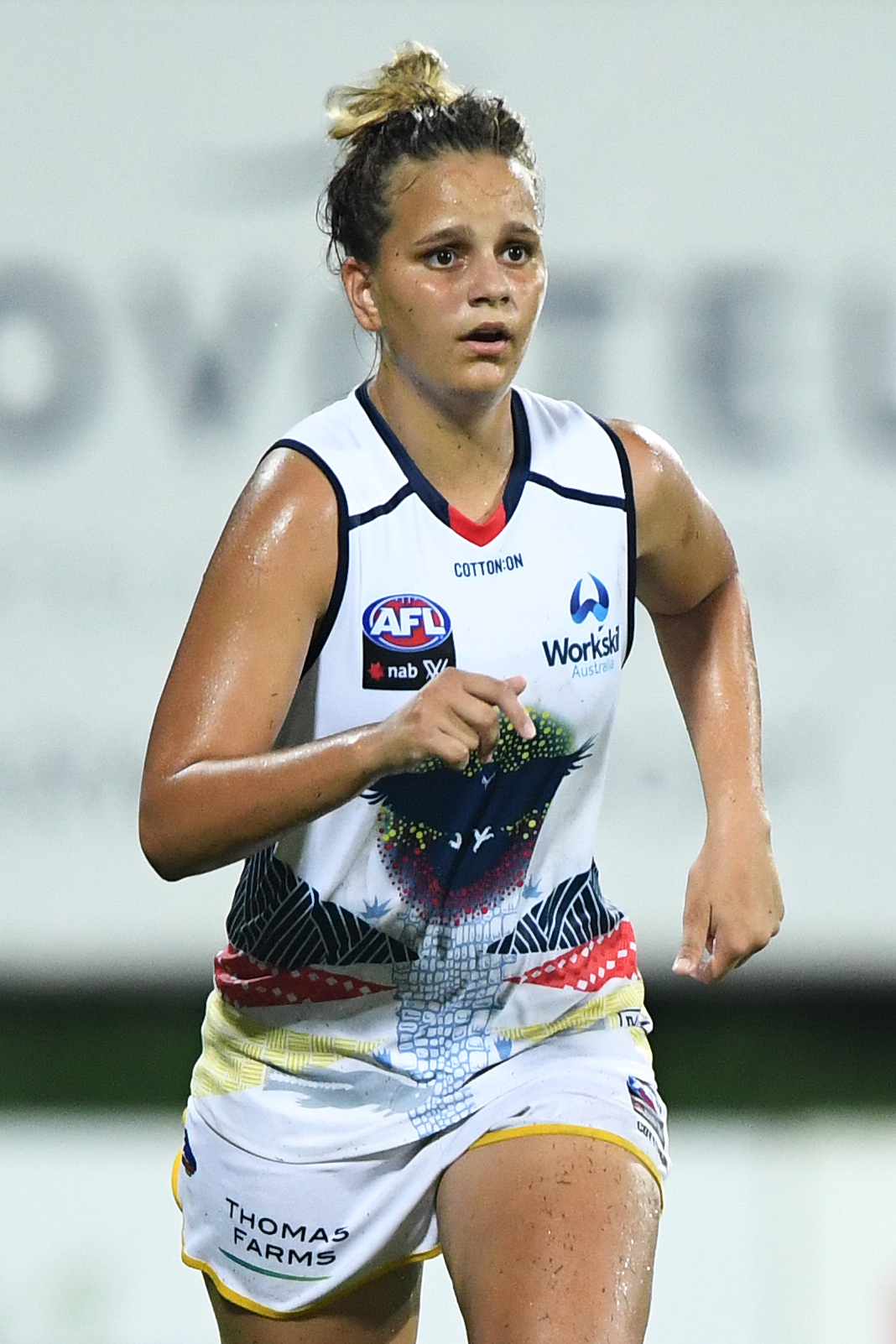
Danielle Ponter is from Darwin

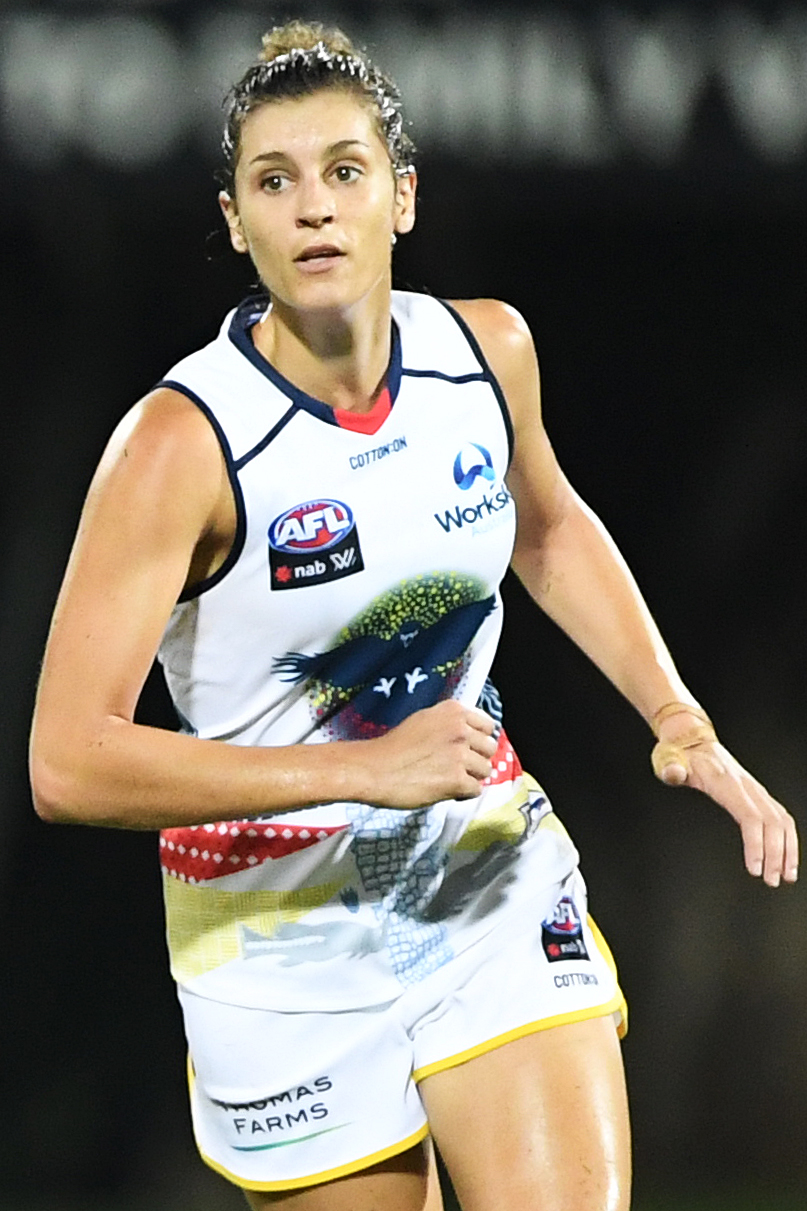
Jasmyn Hewett lived in Darwin

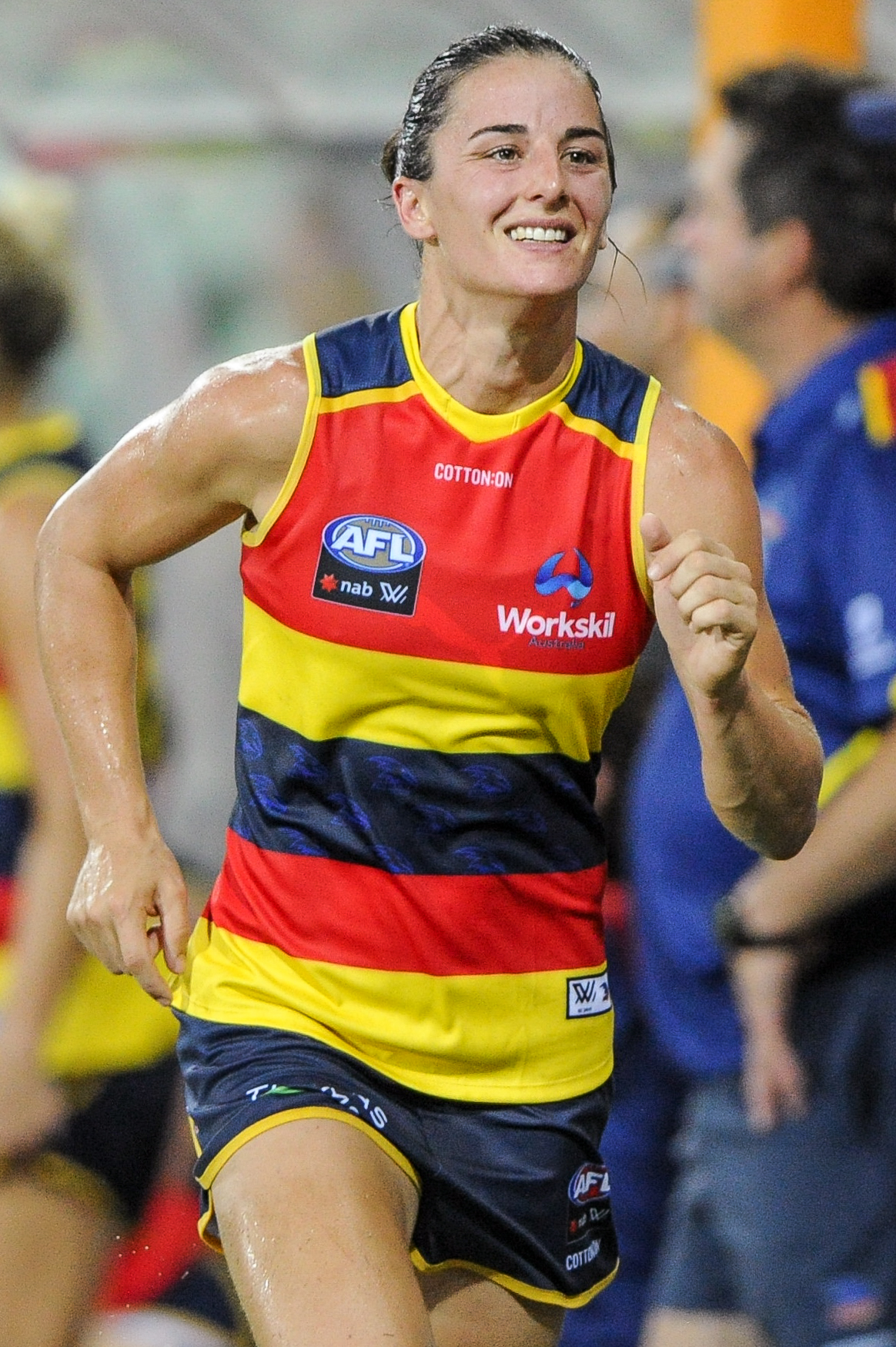
Ange Foley lived in Darwin

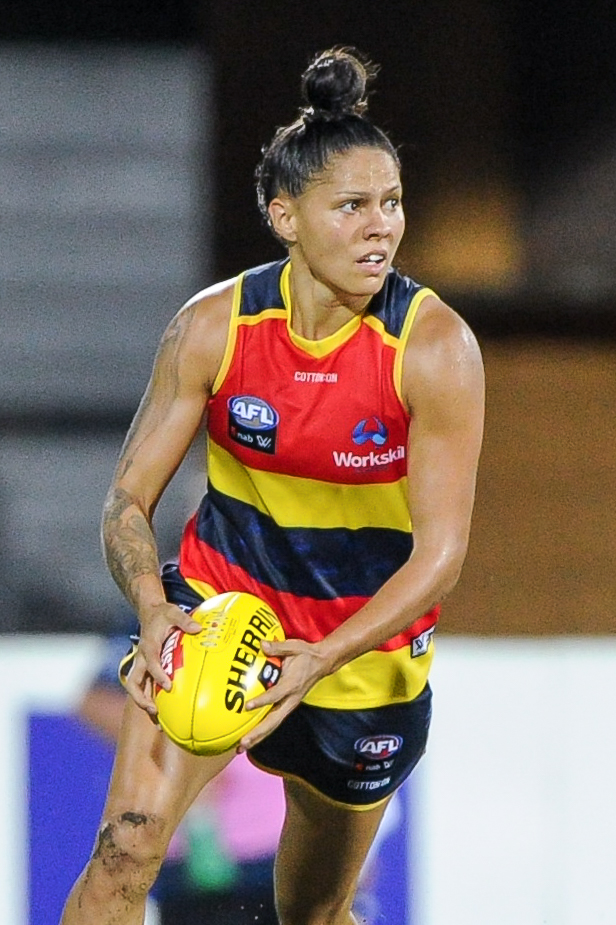
Stevie-Lee Thompson lived in Darwin

Player	NT junior/senior club/s	Representative honours	AFLW Draft	Selection	AFLW years	AFLW games	AFLW goals	Connections to Northern Territory, notes and references
Annabel Kievit	Waratah		2023	#52	2024-	1	0	Raised in Darwin
Mattea Breed	Darwin, NT Thunder		2023 (Supplementary)	Supplementary (#4)	2023-	9	1	Raised in Darwin (Tiwi)
Ashanti Bush	NT Thunder		2021	#8	2022-	10	2	Born and raised in Wugularr and Darwin (Maiawali, Iwaidja, Yolngu)
Janet Baird	Palmerston, NT Thunder		2020	#54	2021-	4	0	Raised in Arnhem Land (Tiwi)
Stephanie Williams	Darwin		2020	#27	2021-	13	2	Born in Darwin, raised in Mandorah (Larrakia)
Danielle Ponter	St Mary's		2018	#48	2019-	59	66	Born and raised in Darwin (Marranunggu, Tiwi and Anmatyerr)
Jordann Hickey	NT Thunder		2018	#31	2019-2021	9	1	Raised in Alice Springs
Jasmyn Hewett	St Mary's		2017	#16	2018-	16	3	Lived in Darwin
Stevie-Lee Thompson	Wanderers		2016	#106	2017-	75	24	Lived in Darwin
Ange Foley	Waratah		2016	Priority selection	2017-	61	6	Lived in Darwin
Abbey Holmes	Waratah		2016	#103	2017-2018	11	3	Lived in Darwin
Alicia Janz	-				2017-2021	20	0	Born in Katherine
Sally Riley	Tracy Village		2016	#39	2017-2021	14	4	Raised in Darwin
Tayla Thorn	Southern Districts		2016	#90	2017-2020	8	0	Born and raised in Humpty Doo (Iwaidja)
Sophie Armitstead	Wanderers		2016	#55	2017-2018	4	0	Raised in Darwin
Heather Anderson	Waratah		2016	#10	2017	8	0	Lived in and recruited from Darwin

== See also ==
- Australian rules football in the Northern Territory
