= 2013–14 NTFL season =

93rd season of the NTFL

- Teams: 9
- Premiers: St Marys; 30th premiership
- Minor premiers: St Marys; 30th minor premiership
- Wooden spooners: Darwin; 16th wooden spoon

The 2013–14 NTFL season was the 93rd season of the Northern Territory Football League (NTFL).

St Marys completed a perfect season to claim there 30th premiership title defeating the Wanderers by 21 points.

- The match between Southern Districts and Tiwi Bombers in Round 8 was abandoned.

== Ladder ==
2013–14 NTFL Ladder
| Pos | Team | Pld | W | L | D | PF | PA | PP | Pts |
|---|---|---|---|---|---|---|---|---|---|
| 1 | St Marys (P) | 17 | 17 | 0 | 0 | 2156 | 1011 | 213.3 | 68 |
| 2 | Wanderers | 17 | 13 | 4 | 0 | 1515 | 1347 | 112.5 | 52 |
| 3 | Nightcliff | 17 | 11 | 6 | 0 | 1660 | 1282 | 129.5 | 44 |
| 4 | Southern Districts | 16 | 9 | 7 | 0 | 1457 | 1384 | 105.3 | 36 |
| 5 | Waratah | 17 | 8 | 9 | 0 | 1261 | 1431 | 88.1 | 32 |
| 6 | Palmerston | 17 | 6 | 11 | 0 | 1294 | 1608 | 80.5 | 24 |
| 7 | Tiwi Bombers | 16 | 4 | 12 | 0 | 1628 | 1878 | 86.7 | 16 |
| 8 | Darwin | 17 | 2 | 15 | 0 | 1033 | 1838 | 56.2 | 8 |
| 9 | Central Australia | 8 | 1 | 7 | 0 | 624 | 849 | 73.5 | 4 |

(P) Premiers

== Grand Final ==
2013–14 NTFL Grand Final
Saturday 15 March 2014 (6:30 pm) | St Marys | def. | Wanderers | Marrara Stadium | Report
4.4 (28); 6.9 (45); 8.10 (58); 11.11 (77) | Q1; Q2; Q3; Final | 2.1 (13); 3.5 (23); 6.6 (42); 8.8 (56)
