= 2012–13 NTFL season =

92nd season of the NTFL

- Teams: 10
- Premiers: St Marys; 29th premiership
- Minor premiers: St Marys; 29th minor premiership
- Wooden spooners: Darwin; 15th wooden spoon

The 2012–13 NTFL season was the 92nd season of the Northern Territory Football League (NTFL).

St Marys won their 29th premiership title, defeating the Tiwi Bombers in the grand final by 31 points.

== Ladder ==
2012–13 NTFL Ladder
Pos	Team	Pld	W	L	D	PF	PA	PP	Pts
1	St Marys (P)	18	17	1	0	2297	1053	218.1	68
2	Tiwi Bombers	18	14	4	0	2279	1734	131.4	56
3	Southern Districts	18	11	7	0	1929	1708	112.9	44
4	Waratah	18	10	8	0	1571	1557	100.9	40
5	Wanderers	18	10	8	0	1530	1630	93.9	40
6	Nightcliff	18	4	14	0	1453	1887	77.0	16
7	Central Australia	4	3	1	0	407	377	108.0	12
8	Palmerston	18	3	15	0	1185	1854	63.9	12
9	Darwin	18	3	15	0	1219	1958	62.3	12
10	Banks	4	1	3	0	348	460	75.7	4

(P) Premiers

== Grand Final ==
2012–13 NTFL Grand Final
Saturday 16 March 2013 (6:30 pm)	St Marys	def.	Tiwi Bombers	Marrara Stadium	Report
3.2 (20); 5.2 (32); 10.5 (65); 16.6 (102)	Q1; Q2; Q3; Final	3.2 (20); 8.3 (51); 11.5 (71); 11.5 (71)
