= 2021–22 NTFL season =

101st season of the NTFL

- Teams: 8
- Premiers: St Marys; 33rd premiership
- Minor premiers: Nightcliff; 12th minor premiership
- Wooden spooners: Tiwi Bombers; 3rd wooden spoon

The 2021–22 NTFL season was the 101st season of the Northern Territory Football League (NTFL).

The first game was played on Friday, 1 October, and the Grand Final was played on Saturday, 19 March, with St Marys winning a record of 33 premierships after defeating Waratah by 35 points in the grand final.

They ended the Nightcliff Tigers chance of winning a 4 peat premiership streak, after playing them in the Preliminary Final after Waratah knocked them off first in the second semi final.

== Ladder ==
2021–22 NTFL Ladder
| Pos | Team | Pld | W | L | D | PF | PA | PP | Pts |
|---|---|---|---|---|---|---|---|---|---|
| 1 | Nightcliff | 17 | 15 | 2 | 0 | 1694 | 983 | 172.3 | 60 |
| 2 | St Marys (P) | 16 | 13 | 3 | 0 | 1577 | 902 | 174.8 | 54 (Note: 2 bonus points?) |
| 3 | Waratah | 16 | 12 | 4 | 0 | 1449 | 1049 | 138.1 | 50 |
| 4 | Wanderers | 17 | 11 | 6 | 0 | 1279 | 1220 | 104.8 | 44 |
| 5 | Southern Districts | 17 | 7 | 9 | 1 | 1355 | 1366 | 99.2 | 30 |
| 6 | Darwin | 17 | 4 | 12 | 1 | 1126 | 1600 | 70.4 | 18 |
| 7 | Palmerston | 17 | 4 | 13 | 0 | 1000 | 1479 | 67.6 | 16 |
| 8 | Tiwi Bombers | 17 | 0 | 17 | 0 | 642 | 1523 | 42.2 | 0 |

(P) Premiers

== Finals ==
Qualifying and elimination finals
2 | St Marys | 44
3 | Waratah | 59
4 | Wanderers | 57
5 | Southern Districts | 45

Semi-finals
1 | Nightcliff | 49
3 | Waratah | 68
2 | St Marys | 111
4 | Wanderers | 47

Preliminary final
1 | Nightcliff | 40
2 | St Marys | 98

Grand final
3 | Waratah | 65
2 | St Marys | 100

== Grand Final ==
2021–22 NTFL Grand Final
Saturday 19 March 2022 (6:30 pm) | Waratah | def. by | St Marys | Marrara Stadium | Report
3.2 (20); 4.2 (26); 5.4 (34); 10.5 (65) | Q1; Q2; Q3; Final | 1.1 (7); 6.3 (39); 11.5 (71); 15.10 (100)

== Notable events ==
- During the fourth quarter of Darwin's round 18 match against Southern Districts, Darwin player Thomas Baulch took a sip from a beer handed to him on-field by a spectator. Video of the moment went viral, with the NTFL suspending Baulch for two weeks, ordering him to remove the video from his social media accounts and write a letter of apology to AFL Northern Territory.
