= 2015–16 NTFL season =

95th season of the NTFL

- Teams: 8
- Premiers: St Marys; 31st premiership
- Minor premiers: Southern Districts; 4th minor premiership
- Wooden spooners: Waratah; 23rd wooden spoon

The 2015–16 NTFL season was the 95th season of the Northern Territory Football League (NTFL).

St Marys have won there 31st premiership title while defeating Wanderers Eagles in the grand final by 2 points.

== Ladder ==
2015–16 NTFL Ladder
Pos	Team	Pld	W	L	D	PF	PA	PP	Pts
1	Southern Districts	18	14	3	1	1864	1232	151.3	58
2	St Marys (P)	18	13	5	0	1837	1175	156.3	52
3	Wanderers	18	10	7	1	1370	1282	106.9	42
4	Darwin	18	10	8	0	1459	1444	101.0	40
5	Nightcliff	18	9	9	0	1712	1616	105.9	36
6	Palmerston	18	9	9	0	1594	1605	99.3	36
7	Tiwi Bombers	18	6	12	0	1833	1748	104.9	24
8	Waratah	18	0	18	0	749	2316	32.3	0

(P) Premiers

== Grand Final ==
2015–16 NTFL Grand Final
Saturday 19 March 2016 (7:00 pm)	Wanderers	def. by	St Marys	Marrara Stadium	Report
0.1 (1); 4.1 (25); 6.4 (40); 7.6 (48)	Q1; Q2; Q3; Final	1.2 (8); 2.7 (19); 4.8 (32); 7.8 (50)
