= 2016–17 NTFL season =

96th season of the NTFL

- Teams: 8
- Premiers: St Marys; 32nd premiership
- Minor premiers: St Marys; 32nd minor premiership
- Wooden spooners: Tiwi Bombers; 1st wooden spoon

The 2016–17 NTFL season was the 96th season of the Northern Territory Football League (NTFL).

The first four games in Round 1 were played on Saturday, 8 October 2016, and the Grand Final was played on Saturday 18 March 2017, with the St Marys Saints defeating Wanderers Eagles by 54 points to win their 32nd premiership title (The most titles in NTFL history).

== Ladder ==
2016–17 NTFL Ladder
Pos	Team	Pld	W	L	D	PF	PA	PP	Pts
1	St Marys (P)	18	16	2	0	2381	1119	212.8	64
2	Nightcliff	18	16	2	0	1933	1175	164.5	64
3	Wanderers	18	10	8	0	1450	1503	96.5	40
4	Southern Districts	18	9	9	0	1598	1619	98.7	36
5	Darwin	18	8	10	0	1460	1554	94.0	32
6	Waratah	18	7	10	1	1213	1429	84.9	30
7	Palmerston	18	3	15	0	953	1906	50.0	12
8	Tiwi Bombers	18	1	16	1	1465	2148	68.2	6

Source: NTFL
Rules for classification: 1) points; 2) percentage; 3) number of points for.
(P) Premiers

== Finals ==
Qualifying and elimination finals
2	Nightcliff	63
3	Wanderers	85
4	Southern Districts	104
5	Darwin	77

Semi-finals
1	St Marys	126
3	Wanderers	26
2	Nightcliff	31
4	Southern Districts	19

Preliminary final
3	Wanderers	113
2	Nightcliff	39

Grand final
1	St Marys	91
3	Wanderers	37

== Grand Final ==
2016–17 NTFL Grand Final
Saturday 18 March 2017 (7:00 pm)	St Marys	def.	Wanderers	Marrara Stadium	Report
3.1 (19); 5.3 (33); 8.6 (54); 13.7 (85)	Q1; Q2; Q3; Final	1.1 (7); 2.5 (17); 3.7 (25); 4.13 (37)

== Women's Premier League ==
The Women's Premier League for 2016–17 season was won by the Darwin Buffettes having a 18-point win over Waratah.

=== Ladder ===
Pos	Team	Pld	W	L	D	PF	PA	PP	Pts	Qualification
1	Darwin	16	13	3	0	1224	340	360.0	52	Finals
2	Waratah	16	13	3	0	1095	446	245.5	52	Finals
3	Pint	16	10	5	1	899	449	200.2	42	Finals
4	Tracy Village	16	10	6	0	666	441	151.0	40	Finals
5	St Marys	16	8	7	1	1097	547	200.5	34	Finals
6	Wanderers	16	8	7	1	904	546	165.6	34	Finals
7	Palmerston	16	4	11	1	441	795	55.5	18	
8	Southern Districts	16	2	14	0	290	1189	24.4	8	
9	Nightcliff	16	2	14	0	156	2019	7.7	8	

Source: NTFL
Rules for classification: 1) points; 2) percentage; 3) number of points for.

=== Finals ===
Qualifying finals
4	Tracy Village	21
5	St Marys	10
1	Darwin	81
2	Waratah	27
3	Pint	33
6	Wanderers	54

Preliminary finals
4	Tracy Village	14
1	Darwin	100
2	Waratah	29
6	Wanderers	14

Grand Final
1	Darwin	45
2	Waratah	27
