= 1993–94 NTFL season =

73rd season of the NTFL

- Teams: 7
- Premiers: St Marys; 19th premiership
- Minor premiers: Darwin
- Wooden spooners: Waratah; 21st wooden spoon
- Best and fairest: Jason Jones (Darwin)
- Leading goalkicker: Brian Stanislaus (St Mary's)

The 1993–94 NTFL season was the 73rd season of the Northern Territory Football League (NTFL).

St Mary's claimed their 19th premiership title defeating the Darwin Buffaloes in the grand final by 115 points.

== Grand Final ==
Premiers	GF Score	Runner-up
St Mary's	26.8 (164) - 7.7 (49)	Darwin
