= 1994–95 NTFL season =

74th season of the NTFL

- Teams: 7
- Premiers: St Marys; 20th premiership
- Minor premiers: St Marys; 22nd minor premiership
- Wooden spooners: Palmerston; 7th wooden spoon

The 1994–95 NTFL season was the 74th season of the Northern Territory Football League (NTFL).

St Marys had completed another perfect season to claim there 20th premiership title defeating the Darwin in the grand final by 97 points.

== Grand Final ==
1994–95 NTFL Grand Final
1995	St Marys	def.	Darwin	Marrara Stadium
2.3 (15); 6.7 (43); 11.9 (75); 21.13 (139)	Q1; Q2; Q3; Final	1.3 (9); 4.4 (28); 5.5 (35); 6.6 (42)
This was the second time when St Marys completed a perfect season (First being 1984–85).
