= 1977–78 NTFL season =

57th season of the NTFL

- Teams: 6
- Premiers: St Marys; 9th premiership
- Minor premiers: St Marys; 10th minor premiership
- Wooden spooners: Waratah; 14th wooden spoon

The 1977–78 season was the 57th season of the Northern Territory Football League (NTFL).

St Marys have won their ninth premiership title while defeating the Nth. Darwin (Palmerston) Magpies in the grand final by 23 points.

== Grand Final ==
Premiers	GF Score	Runner-up
St Marys	15.17 (107) - 13.6 (84)	Nth. Darwin (Palmerston)
