= 1998–99 NTFL season =

78th season of the NTFL

- Teams: 7
- Premiers: Waratah; 14th premiership
- Minor premiers: Waratah
- Wooden spooners: Wanderers; 24th wooden spoon

The 1998–99 NTFL season was the 78th season of the Northern Territory Football League (NTFL).

Waratah have won there 14th premiership title while defeating St Marys in the grand final by 66 points.

== Grand Final ==
Premiers	GF Score	Runner-up
Waratah	19.13 (127) - 8.13 (61)	St Marys
