= 2002–03 NTFL season =

82nd season of the NTFL

- Teams: 7
- Premiers: St Marys; 23rd premiership
- Minor premiers: Palmerston; 4th minor premiership
- Wooden spooners: Southern Districts; 2nd wooden spoon

The 2002–03 NTFL season was the 82nd season of the Northern Territory Football League (NTFL).

St Marys have won there 23rd premiership title while defeating the Palmerston in the grand final by 11 points.

== Grand Final ==
Premiers	GF Score	Runner-up
St Marys	15.4 (94) - 12.11 (83)	Palmerston
