= 2008–09 NTFL season =

88th season of the NTFL

- Teams: 8
- Premiers: St Marys; 27th premiership
- Minor premiers: St Marys; 27th minor premiership
- Wooden spooners: Darwin; 12th wooden spoon

The 2008–09 NTFL season was the 88th season of the Northern Territory Football League (NTFL).

St Marys have won there 27th premiership title while defeating Wanderers Eagles in the grand final by 64 points.

== Grand Final ==
Premiers	GF Score	Runner-up
St Marys	22.13 (145) - 11.15 (81)	Wanderers
