= 1961–62 NTFL season =

41st season of the NTFL

- Teams: 5
- Premiers: St Marys; 5th premiership
- Minor premiers: Nightcliff; 3rd minor premiership
- Wooden spooners: Waratah; 11th wooden spoon

The 1961–62 NTFL season was the 41st season of the Northern Territory Football League (NTFL).

St Marys have won there 5th premiership title while defeating the Buffaloes in the grand final by 16 points.

== Grand Final ==
Premiers	GF Score	Runner-up
St. Marys	10.12 (72) - 8.8 (56)	Buffaloes (Darwin)
