= 1962–63 NTFL season =

42nd season of the NTFL

- Teams: 5
- Premiers: Darwin; 13th premiership
- Minor premiers: Darwin
- Wooden spooners: Waratah; 12th wooden spoon

The 1962–63 NTFL season was the 42nd season of the Northern Territory Football League (NTFL).

Buffaloes have won there 13th premiership title while defeating St Marys in the grand final by 30 points.

== Grand Final ==
Premiers	GF Score	Runner-up
Darwin	11.7 (73) - 6.7 (43)	St. Marys
