= 1947–48 NTFL season =

27th season of the NTFL

- Teams: 5
- Premiers: Waratah; 8th premiership
- Minor premiers: Darwin
- Wooden spooners: Winnellie; 1st wooden spoon

The 1947–48 NTFL season was the 27th season of the Northern Territory Football League (NTFL).

Waratah have won their eighth premiership title while defeating the Buffaloes in the grand final by 13 points.

== Grand Final ==
| Premiers | GF Score | Runner-up |
|---|---|---|
| Waratah | 9.8 (62) - 6.13 (49) | Buffaloes (Darwin) |
