= 1992–93 NTFL season =

72nd season of the NTFL

- Teams: 7
- Premiers: Wanderers; 10th premiership
- Minor premiers: St Marys; 21st minor premiership
- Wooden spooners: Nightcliff; 3rd wooden spoon

The 1992–93 NTFL season was the 72nd season of the Northern Territory Football League (NTFL).

The Wanderers Eagles have won there 10th premiership title while defeating St Marys in the grand final by 51 points.

== Grand Final ==
Premiers	GF Score	Runner-up
Wanderers	16.9 (105) - 8.6 (54)	St Marys
