= 1995–96 NTFL season =

75th season of the NTFL

- Teams: 7
- Premiers: St Marys; 21st premiership
- Minor premiers: St Marys; 23rd minor premiership
- Wooden spooners: Nightcliff; 4th wooden spoon

The 1995–96 NTFL season was the 75th season of the Northern Territory Football League (NTFL).

St Marys had completed a perfect season back to back to set a record of success. The Saints have claimed there 21st premiership title defeating Southern Districts in the grand final by 16 points.

== Grand Final ==
1995–96 NTFL Grand Final
1996	St Marys	def.	Southern Districts	Marrara Stadium
5.4 (34); 7.6 (48); 11.8 (74); 13.11 (89)	Q1; Q2; Q3; Final	1.2 (8); 5.2 (32); 9.6 (60); 11.7 (73)
This was the third time when St Marys completed a perfect season and the first time when a team has completed an undefeated season back to back.
