= 1953–54 NTFL season =

33rd season of the NTFL

- Teams: 5
- Premiers: Waratah; 11th premiership
- Minor premiers: Darwin
- Wooden spooners: Wanderers; 7th wooden spoon

The 1953–54 NTFL season was the 33rd season of the Northern Territory Football League (NTFL).

Waratah have won there 11th premiership title while defeating the Buffaloes in the grand final by 18 points.

== Grand Final ==
Premiers	GF Score	Runner-up
Waratah	6.9 (45) - 3.9 (27)	Buffaloes (Darwin)
