= 2007–08 NTFL season =

87th season of the NTFL

- Teams: 8
- Premiers: St Marys; 26th premiership
- Minor premiers: Southern Districts; 3rd minor premiership
- Wooden spooners: Wanderers; 28th wooden spoon

The 2007/08 NTFL season was the 87th season of the Northern Territory Football League (NTFL).

St Marys have won there 26th premiership title while defeating Waratah in the grand final by 96 points.

== Grand Final ==
Premiers	GF Score	Runner-up
St Marys	21.20 (146) - 7.8 (50)	Waratah
