= 2004–05 NTFL season =

84th season of the NTFL

- Teams: 7
- Premiers: St Marys; 25th premiership
- Minor premiers: St Marys; 25th minor premiership
- Wooden spooners: Palmerston; 8th wooden spoon

The 2004–05 NTFL season was the 84th season of the Northern Territory Football League (NTFL).

St Marys have won there 25th premiership title while defeating the Wanderers in the grand final by 28 points.

== Grand Final ==
| Premiers | GF Score | Runner-up |
|---|---|---|
| St Marys | 15.10 (100) - 10.12 (72) | Wanderers |
