= 1997–98 NTFL season =

77th season of the NTFL

- Teams: 7
- Premiers: Southern Districts; 1st premiership
- Minor premiers: Southern Districts; 1st minor premiership
- Wooden spooners: Wanderers; 23rd wooden spoon

The 1997–98 NTFL season was the 77th season of the Northern Territory Football League (NTFL).

Southern Districts have claimed their first ever title defeating the NTFL's powerhouse team, St Marys by 25 points in the grand final.

== Grand Final ==
Premiers	GF Score	Runner-up
Southern Districts	17.8 (110) - 12.13 (85)	St Marys
