= 1967–68 NTFL season =

47th season of the NTFL

- Teams: 5
- Premiers: Darwin; 15th premiership
- Minor premiers: Darwin
- Wooden spooners: Wanderers; 16th wooden spoon

The 1967–68 NTFL season was the 47th season of the Northern Territory Football League (NTFL).

Darwin have won there 15th premiership title while defeating St Marys in the grand final by 44 points. The Saints scoreboard 1.2 (8) was their lowest score in a grand final.

== Grand Final ==
| Premiers | GF Score | Runner-up |
|---|---|---|
| Darwin | 7.10 (52) - 1.2 (8) | St Marys |
