= 1966–67 NTFL season =

46th season of the NTFL

- Teams: 5
- Premiers: St Marys; 7th premiership
- Minor premiers: St Marys; 7th minor premiership
- Wooden spooners: Wanderers; 14th wooden spoon

The 1966–67 NTFL season was the 46th season of the Northern Territory Football League (NTFL).

St Marys have won their seventh premiership title while defeating Darwin in the grand final by 22 points.

== Grand Final ==
Premiers	GF Score	Runner-up
St Marys	15.9 (99) - 11.11 (77)	Darwin
