= 1990–91 NTFL season =

70th season of the NTFL

- Teams: 7
- Premiers: St Marys; 17th premiership
- Minor premiers: St Marys; 19th minor premiership
- Wooden spooners: Palmerston; 6th wooden spoon

The 1990–91 NTFL season was the 70th season of the Northern Territory Football League (NTFL).

St Marys have won there 17th premiership title while defeating the Darwin Buffaloes in the grand final by 53 points.

== Grand Final ==
| Premiers | GF Score | Runner-up |
|---|---|---|
| St Marys | 22-13 (145) - 14-8 (92) | Darwin |
