= 1954–55 NTFL season =

34th season of the NTFL

- Teams: 5
- Premiers: St Marys; 1st premiership
- Minor premiers: St Marys; 1st minor premiership
- Wooden spooners: Wanderers; 8th wooden spoon

The 1954–55 NTFL season was the 34th season of the Northern Territory Football League (NTFL).

St Marys have won there 1st premiership title while defeating the Buffaloes in the grand final by 30 points.

== Grand Final ==
Premiers	GF Score	Runner-up
St Marys	10.12 (72) - 5.12 (42)	Buffaloes (Darwin)
