= 1951–52 NTFL season =

31st season of the NTFL

- Teams: 4
- Premiers: Darwin; 12th premiership
- Minor premiers: Darwin
- Wooden spooners: Waratah; 7th wooden spoon

The 1951–52 NTFL season was the 31st season of the Northern Territory Football League (NTFL).

Buffaloes have won there 12th premiership title while defeating the Wanderers Eagles in the grand final by 14 points.

== Grand Final ==
Premiers	GF Score	Runner-up
Buffaloes (Darwin)	13.16 (94) - 12.8 (80)	Wanderers
