= 2003–04 NTFL season =

83rd season of the NTFL

- Teams: 7
- Premiers: St Marys; 24th premiership
- Minor premiers: Nightcliff; 7th minor premiership
- Wooden spooners: Southern Districts; 3rd wooden spoon

The 2003–04 NTFL season was the 83rd season of the Northern Territory Football League (NTFL).

St Marys have won there 24th premiership title while defeating the Nightcliff Tigers in the grand final by 19 points.

== Grand Final ==
Premiers	GF Score	Runner-up
St Marys	12.11 (83) - 9.10 (64)	Nightcliff
