= 1968–69 NTFL season =

48th season of the NTFL

- Teams: 5
- Premiers: Darwin; 16th premiership
- Minor premiers: Darwin
- Wooden spooners: Wanderers; 17th wooden spoon

The 1968–69 NTFL season was the 48th season of the Northern Territory Football League (NTFL).

Darwin have won there 16th premiership title while defeating St Marys in the grand final by 42 points.

== Grand Final ==
Premiers	GF Score	Runner-up
Darwin	16.13 (109) - 9.13 (67)	St Marys
