= 1983–84 NTFL season =

63rd season of the NTFL

- Teams: 6
- Premiers: St Marys; 11th premiership
- Minor premiers: St Marys; 12th minor premiership
- Wooden spooners: Waratah; 18th wooden spoon

The 1983–84 NTFL season was the 63rd season of the Northern Territory Football League (NTFL).

St Marys have claimed there 11th premiership title defeating the Darwin Buffaloes in the grand final by 12 points.

== Grand Final ==
Premiers	GF Score	Runner-up
St Marys	13.11 (89) - 11.11 (77)	Darwin
