= 2009–10 NTFL season =

89th season of the NTFL

- Teams: 8
- Premiers: St Marys; 28th premiership
- Minor premiers: Tiwi Bombers; 1st minor premiership
- Wooden spooners: Darwin; 13th wooden spoon

The 2009–10 NTFL season was the 89th season of the Northern Territory Football League (NTFL).

The Grand Final was played on Saturday 13 March 2010. St Marys won the title by 10 points over an upset victory against the minor premiers, Tiwi Bombers.

== Grand Final ==
Premiers	GF Score	Runner-up
St Marys	11.8 (74) - 9.10 (64)	Tiwi Bombers
