= 1999–2000 NTFL season =

79th season of the NTFL

- Teams: 7
- Premiers: Waratah; 15th premiership
- Minor premiers: Waratah
- Wooden spooners: Wanderers; 25th wooden spoon

The 1999–2000 NTFL season was the 79th season of the Northern Territory Football League (NTFL).

Waratah have won there 15th premiership title while defeating the Palmerston Magpies in the grand final by 40 points.

== Grand Final ==
Premiers	GF Score	Runner-up
Waratah	14.12 (96) - 8.8 (56)	Palmerston
