= 1991–92 NTFL season =

71st season of the NTFL

- Teams: 7
- Premiers: St Marys; 18th premiership
- Minor premiers: St Marys; 20th minor premiership
- Wooden spooners: Southern Districts; 1st wooden spoon

The 1991–92 NTFL season was the 71st season of the Northern Territory Football League (NTFL).

St Marys have won there 18th premiership title while defeating the Darwin Buffaloes in the grand final by 31 points.

== Grand Final ==
Premiers	GF Score	Runner-up
St Marys	15.7 (97) - 9.12 (66)	Darwin
