= 1996–97 NTFL season =

76th season of the NTFL

- Teams: 7
- Premiers: St Marys; 22nd premiership
- Minor premiers: St Marys; 24th minor premiership
- Wooden spooners: Darwin; 10th wooden spoon

The 1996–97 NTFL season was the 76th season of the Northern Territory Football League (NTFL).

St Marys have claimed there 22nd premiership title defeating Waratah by 16 points in the grand final. The Saints almost made a perfect season, but lost the 2nd semi final before the grand final.

== Grand Final ==
Premiers	GF Score	Runner-up
St Marys	21.9 (135) - 11.8 (74)	Waratah
