= 1955–56 NTFL season =

35th season of the NTFL

- Teams: 5
- Premiers: St Marys; 2nd premiership
- Minor premiers: St Marys; 2nd minor premiership
- Wooden spooners: Wanderers; 9th wooden spoon

The 1955–56 NTFL season was the 35th season of the Northern Territory Football League (NTFL).

St Marys have won there 2nd premiership title while defeating Waratah in the grand final by 5 points.

== Grand Final ==
Premiers	GF Score	Runner-up
St Marys	8.8 (56) - 7.9 (51)	Waratah
