= 1959–60 NTFL season =

39th season of the NTFL

- Teams: 5
- Premiers: St Marys; 4th premiership
- Minor premiers: St Marys; 4th minor premiership
- Wooden spooners: Waratah; 10th wooden spoon

The 1959–60 NTFL season was the 39th season of the Northern Territory Football League (NTFL).

St Marys have won their fourth premiership title while defeating the Buffaloes in the grand final by 47 points.

== Grand Final ==
Premiers	GF Score	Runner-up
St Marys	12.9 (81) - 5.4 (34)	Buffaloes (Darwin)
