= 1989–90 NTFL season =

69th season of the NTFL

- Teams: 7
- Premiers: St Marys; 16th premiership
- Minor premiers: St Marys; 18th minor premiership
- Wooden spooners: Wanderers; 22nd wooden spoon

The 1989–90 NTFL season was the 69th season of the Northern Territory Football League (NTFL).

St Marys have won their 16th premiership title while defeating the Darwin Buffaloes in the grand final by 108 points.

== Grand Final ==
Premiers	GF Score	Runner-up
St Marys	28.15 (183) - 10.15 (75)	Darwin
