= 1970–71 NTFL season =

50th season of the NTFL

- Teams: 5
- Premiers: Darwin; 18th premiership
- Minor premiers: Darwin
- Wooden spooners: Wanderers; 18th wooden spoon

The 1970–71 NTFL season was the 50th season of the Northern Territory Football League (NTFL).

Darwin have won there 18th premiership title while defeating St Marys in the grand final by 48 points.

== Grand Final ==
Premiers	GF Score	Runner-up
Darwin	16.7 (103) - 7.13 (55)	St. Marys
