= 1971–72 NTFL season =

51st season of the NTFL

- Teams: 5
- Premiers: St Marys; 8th premiership
- Minor premiers: Darwin
- Wooden spooners: Wanderers; 19th wooden spoon

The 1971–72 NTFL season was the 51st season of the Northern Territory Football League (NTFL).

St Marys have won their eighth premiership title while defeating the Darwin in the grand final by one point.

== Grand Final ==
Premiers	GF Score	Runner-up
St. Marys	13.7 (85) - 12.12 (84)	Darwin
