= 1982–83 NTFL season =

62nd season of the NTFL

- Teams: 6
- Premiers: Wanderers; 9th premiership
- Minor premiers: Wanderers
- Wooden spooners: Waratah; 17th wooden spoon

The 1982–83 NTFL season was the 62nd season of the Northern Territory Football League (NTFL).

The Wanderers Eagles have won their ninth premiership title while defeating St Marys in the grand final by 11 points.

== Grand Final ==
Premiers	GF Score	Runner-up
Wanderers	14.8 (92) - 12.9 (81)	St Marys
