= 1965–66 NTFL season =

45th season of the NTFL

- Teams: 5
- Premiers: St Marys; 6th premiership
- Minor premiers: St Marys; 6th minor premiership
- Wooden spooners: Wanderers; 13th wooden spoon

The 1965–66 NTFL season was the 45th season of the Northern Territory Football League (NTFL).

St Marys have won there 6th premiership title while defeating Nightcliff in the grand final by 37 points.

== Grand Final ==
Premiers	GF Score	Runner-up
St Marys	17.11 (113) - 11.10 (76)	Nightcliff
