= 1976–77 NTFL season =

56th season of the NTFL

- Teams: 6
- Premiers: Waratah; 13th premiership
- Minor premiers: St Marys; 9th minor premiership
- Wooden spooners: Wanderers; 20th wooden spoon

The 1976–77 NTFL season was the 56th season of the Northern Territory Football League (NTFL).

Waratah have won there 13th premiership title while defeating St Marys in the grand final by 13 points.

== Grand Final ==
Premiers	GF Score	Runner-up
Waratahs	10.15 (75) - 8.14 (62)	St Marys
