= 1958–59 NTFL season =

38th season of the NTFL

- Teams: 5
- Premiers: St Marys; 3rd premiership
- Minor premiers: St Marys; 3rd minor premiership
- Wooden spooners: Waratah; 9th wooden spoon

The 1958–59 NTFL season was the 38th season of the Northern Territory Football League (NTFL).

St Marys have won their third premiership title while defeating the Buffaloes in the grand final by 80 points.

== Grand Final ==
Premiers	GF Score	Runner-up
St Marys	17.20 (122) - 6.6 (42)	Buffaloes (Darwin)
