= 1972–73 NTFL season =

52nd season of the NTFL

- Teams: 6
- Premiers: Darwin; 19th premiership
- Minor premiers: Darwin
- Wooden spooners: Palmerston; 1st wooden spoon

The 1972–73 NTFL season was the 52nd season of the Northern Territory Football League (NTFL).

Darwin have won there 19th premiership title while defeating St Marys in the grand final by 30 points.

== Grand Final ==
Premiers	GF Score	Runner-up
Darwin	7.13 (55) - 3.7 (25)	St. Marys
