= 1949–50 NTFL season =

29th season of the NTFL

- Teams: 4
- Premiers: Darwin; 10th premiership
- Minor premiers: Darwin
- Wooden spooners: Waratah; 6th wooden spoon

The 1949–50 NTFL season was the 29th season of the Northern Territory Football League (NTFL).

Buffaloes have won their 10th premiership title while defeating the Wanderers in the grand final by 54 points.

== Grand Final ==
Premiers	GF Score	Runner-up
Buffaloes (Darwin)	10.11 (71) - 2.5 (17)	Wanderers
