= 1980–81 NTFL season =

60th season of the NTFL

- Teams: 6
- Premiers: Palmerston; 1st premiership
- Minor premiers: Palmerston; 1st minor premiership
- Wooden spooners: Waratah; 16th wooden spoon

The 1980–81 NTFL season was the 60th season of the Northern Territory Football League (NTFL).

Nth. Darwin (Palmerston) have won their first ever Premiership title while defeating the Wanderers Eagles in the grand final by 6 points (1 goal).

== Grand Final ==
Premiers	GF Score	Runner-up
Nth. Darwin (Palmerston)	15.9 (99) – 14.9 (93)	Wanderers
