= 1975–76 NTFL season =

55th season of the NTFL

- Teams: 6
- Premiers: Darwin; 20th premiership
- Minor premiers: Darwin
- Wooden spooners: Waratah; 13th wooden spoon

The 1975–76 NTFL season was the 55th season of the Northern Territory Football League (NTFL).

Darwin have won there 20th premiership title while defeating the Nth. Darwin (Palmerston) Magpies in the grand final by 38 points.

== Grand Final ==
Premiers	GF Score	Runner-up
Darwin	16.14 (110) - 11.6 (72)	Nth. Darwin (Palmerston) Magpies
