= 1985–86 NTFL season =

65th season of the NTFL

- Teams: 6
- Premiers: St Marys; 13th premiership
- Minor premiers: St Marys; 14th minor premiership
- Wooden spooners: Palmerston; 4th wooden spoon

The 1985–86 NTFL season was the 65th season of the Northern Territory Football League (NTFL).

St Marys have won there 13th premiership title while defeating the Nightcliff Tigers in the grand final by 178 points, the highest winning margin in an NTFL grand final.

== Grand Final ==
Premiers	GF Score	Runner-up
St Marys	32.19 (211) - 4.9 (33)	Nightcliff
