= 1957–58 NTFL season =

37th season of the NTFL

- Teams: 5
- Premiers: Wanderers; 7th premiership
- Minor premiers: Nightcliff; 2nd minor premiership
- Wooden spooners: Waratah; 8th wooden spoon

The 1957–58 NTFL season was the 37th season of the Northern Territory Football League (NTFL).

Wanderers have won their seventh premiership title while defeating the Nightcliff in the grand final by nine points.

== Grand Final ==
Premiers	GF Score	Runner-up
Wanderers	17.9 (111) - 14.18 (102)	Works and Housing (Nightcliff)
