= 1986–87 NTFL season =

66th season of the NTFL

- Teams: 6
- Premiers: St Marys; 14th premiership
- Minor premiers: St Marys; 15th minor premiership
- Wooden spooners: Palmerston; 5th wooden spoon

The 1986–87 NTFL season was the 66th season of the Northern Territory Football League (NTFL).

St Marys have won there 14th premiership title while defeating the Darwin Buffaloes in the grand final by 121 points.

== Grand Final ==
| Premiers | GF Score | Runner-up |
|---|---|---|
| St Marys | 26.14 (170) - 7.7 (49) | Darwin |
