= 1987–88 NTFL season =

67th season of the NTFL

- Teams: 8
- Premiers: St Marys; 15th premiership
- Minor premiers: St Marys; 16th minor premiership
- Wooden spooners: Katherine; 1st wooden spoon

The 1987–88 NTFL season was the 67th season of the Northern Territory Football League (NTFL).

St Marys have won there 15th premiership title while defeating the Darwin Buffaloes in the grand final by 61 points.

== Grand Final ==
Premiers	GF Score	Runner-up
St Marys	19.15 (129) - 10.8 (68)	Darwin
