= Brian Stanislaus =

Australian rules footballer

Personal information
- Full name: Brian Stanislaus
- Born: 13 July 1971 (age 55)
- Original team: St Mary's (NTFL)
- Draft: 54th, 1990 National Draft
- Height: 178 cm (5 ft 10 in)
- Weight: 77 kg (170 lb)

Playing career^{1}
Years	Club	Games (Goals)
1991	Sydney Swans	1 (0)
- ^{1} Playing statistics correct to the end of 1991.

Brian Stanislaus (born 13 July 1971) is a former Australian rules footballer who played with the Sydney Swans in the Australian Football League (AFL).

Stanislaus made just one appearance for Sydney, in round three of the 1991 AFL season, against Adelaide. In 1992 and 1993 he played for North Launceston in the Tasmanian Statewide League. Whilst there he was given another chance to play AFL football when he was selected by the Brisbane Bears in the 1992 Mid-Season Draft, but he never played a senior game for the club.

The Tiwi Islander instead made his name playing for St Mary's in the Northern Territory Football League. An eight time premiership player, Stanislaus made 258 appearances for the club and kicked 776 goals. He twice won the St Marys best and fairest award and was a seven time leading goal-kicker.

He played briefly for East Perth in 1990.
