= 1916–17 NTFL season =

First season of the Northern Territory Football League

- Teams: 3
- Premiers: Wanderers; 1st premiership
- Minor premiers: Wanderers; 1st minor premiership

The 1916–17 NTFL season was the first season of the Northern Territory Football League (NTFL). The Wanderers were the first team to win the premiership in NTFL history, winning it for finishing on top of the ladder after the home and away season. There were no finals until 1918–19.
