= Michael Long (footballer) =

Australian rules footballer, born 1969

Michael Long OAM
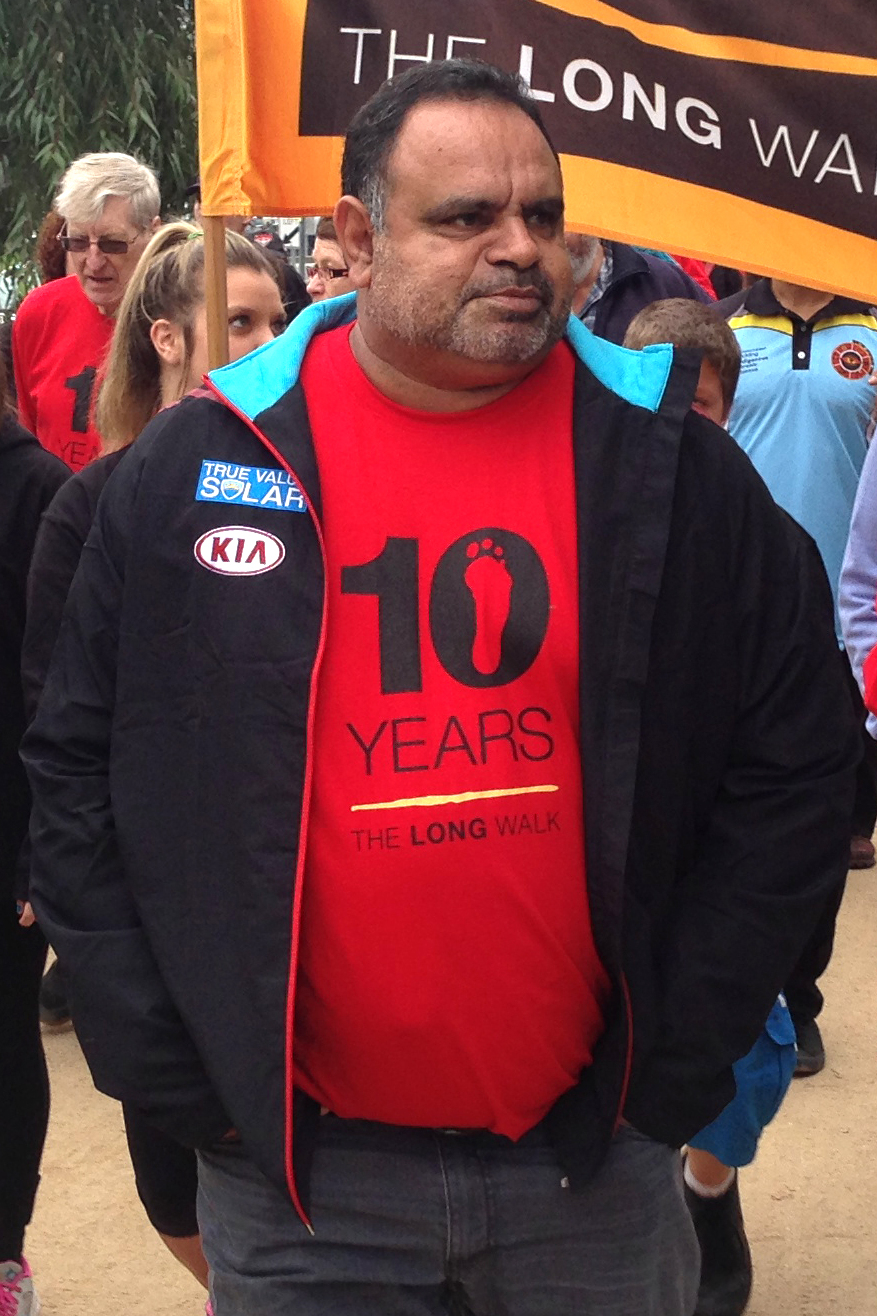
- Long on The Long Walk in 2014

Personal information
- Full name: Michael Long
- Born: 1 October 1969 (age 57); Tiwi Islands
- Original team: St Mary's/West Torrens
- Draft: No. 23., 1988 national draft
- Height: 178 cm (5 ft 10 in)
- Weight: 82 kg (181 lb)
- Position: Midfielder

Playing career^{1}
Years	Club	Games (Goals)
1986-1988	St Mary's	53 (70)
1988	West Torrens	22 (11)
1989–2001	Essendon	190 (143)
Total		265 (224)

Representative team honours
Years	Team	Games (Goals)
1988	Northern Territory	3 (9)
1993	QLD/NT	1 (0)
- ^{1} Playing statistics correct to the end of 2001.

Career highlights
- Dual Essendon premiership player: 1993, 2000; Norm Smith Medal: 1993; All-Australian team: 1988, 1995; St Mary's premiership player: 1986–1987, 1987–1988; West Torrens best and fairest: 1988; VFL Rookie of the Year: 1989; Equal 4th in the Brownlow Medal: 1995; Australian Football Hall of Fame

Michael Long OAM (born 1 October 1969) is a former Australian rules footballer of Aboriginal descent who became a spokesperson for Indigenous rights and against racism in sport in Australia.

Long played in dual Australian Football League (AFL) premierships with the Essendon Football Club, including a Norm Smith Medal for his 1993 grand final performance. As an activist, he is credited with being instrumental in the introduction of a racial vilification code in the AFL in 1995 and the inspiration behind "The Long Walk" commemorating the Stolen Generations, now a strong AFL tradition. In August 2023, Long began a 650-kilometre (400 mi) walk between Melbourne and Canberra in support of the forthcoming Australian Indigenous Voice referendum. He completed the walk in 20 days and arrived in Canberra on 14 September 2023.

== Early life ==
Michael Long was born on 1 October 1969 to mother Agnes and father Jack Long. Both were removed from their parents at a young age and taken to Melville Island, one of the Tiwi Islands. Jack's half Chinese and half English father fought unsuccessfully for custody of his son. Agnes was taken from Daly River near Darwin, and Jack was taken from Ti Tree near Alice Springs. Michael grew up in a mixed community in Darwin as one of nine children was raised on the Tiwi Islands.

== Early career ==
Long moved to Darwin to play with St Mary's, where he played in several premierships. In 1988, he represented the Northern Territory at the Adelaide Bicentennial Carnival in March, and his outstanding performances in the dominant NT team saw enormous interest in his recruitment from various first-class clubs throughout the country, including Essendon, which nominated him in the 1988 VFL draft. (Note: While the top-flight league back then was known as the VFL at this time, players could be drafted across the country, hence it is also known as the VFL National Draft during this period.)

Despite being drafted to the Victorian Football League (VFL), South Australian National Football League (SANFL) club West Torrens argued that Long was "contracted with the club and could not play anywhere else". Recruiter Noel Judkins said, "I was guaranteed this wasn't the case, so I took the contract to Darwin and met with Michael's father Jack, and he was irate. He grabbed it and wrote the word 'bullshit' right across the front of it. When it became clear he wanted to play at Essendon, West Torrens agreed it wasn't a binding contract." However, despite this, Long did play for West Torrens during the 1988 SANFL season, winning the club's best-and-fairest award, the third-last player to do so, as the Eagles merged with the Woodville Football Club following the 1990 season to become the Woodville-West Torrens Eagles.

== Australian Football League career ==
Long played perhaps the best game of his career in the 1993 AFL grand final. Playing on Mark Athorn, Long ran amok, helping Essendon gain a healthy quarter-time lead and then maintain it. By the end of the game, he had amassed 20 kicks and 13 handballs, totalling 33 possessions. Long's performance was rewarded with the Norm Smith Medal, which was presented to him by fellow Tiwi Islander Maurice Rioli.

In the pre-season of 1994, in a practice match against West Coast, Long injured his knee, which required 12 months of solid rehabilitation, and he was not seen for the entire home-and-away season. In 1995, Long made a triumphant return to AFL football and played almost a full season. In the inaugural Anzac Day match between Essendon and Collingwood at the MCG, an incident of racial abuse targeting Long occurred, which was to have a lasting impact on the game.

For the next two seasons, Long needed knee surgery and only took the field seven times. He missed the first half of 1998 while recovering from the surgery, but he finished the year strongly, playing in nine games. According to the round 3, 1999 edition of the AFL Record, between the beginning of the 1994 and the end of the 1998 seasons, Long played only 38 of a possible 119 games.

Long had the honour of kicking the first-ever goal at the new Docklands Stadium when it opened in 2000. He was also a member of Essendon's record-breaking premiership team in 2000 which lost only one game for the entire season. Long faced heavy scrutiny for his bump on Troy Simmonds, which rendered Simmonds unconscious and raised the possibility of him losing mobility. While this never eventuated, the incident prompted the AFL to introduce new rules protecting players with their heads over the ball. Long was thus suspended for the act.

2001 was Long's final season, and although Essendon again made the grand final, Long aggravated a hamstring injury during training in the week leading up to the match and was forced to name himself unavailable on the eve of the game, which Essendon lost to Brisbane.

=== Racial abuse ===
In the inaugural Anzac Day match of the 1995 season between Essendon and Collingwood at the MCG, Long made an official complaint after he had been racially taunted by Collingwood ruckman Damian Monkhorst. The AFL arranged a mediation session between Long and Monkhorst and held a media conference. Although Long was clearly unsatisfied by the short-term outcome of their meeting, and both players received death threats, the long-term result was that it set a racial vilification code that held players to account for racist acts on the field. An AFL investigation after the incident showed that at least 10 players from six clubs regularly racially abused players. Since this incident, there have only been a handful of widely publicised accusations of racial taunts by a player on the AFL field in the following three decades, although racial abuse from fans has proved to be a recurring issue over the years. Twenty years after the incident, at the MCG to launch the 11th Long Walk in 2015, Monkhorst and Long met and shook hands in a mutually respectful manner. Long said that Monkhorst had since shown great leadership.

In 1997, Peter "Spida" Everitt reportedly racially abused Long, which ironically drew a free kick to Everitt due to Long's enraged physical response. Although nothing of consequence happened from the Long–Everitt incident, Everitt racially vilified Melbourne's Scott Chisholm two years later and undertook a racial awareness training program as well as donating $20,000 to a charity of Chisholm's choice. In addition, Everitt lost $50,000–$60,000 in match bonuses (depending on sources) from the incident. The incident came a week after Sam Newman infamously donned blackface to mock Nicky Winmar for declining to come on The Footy Show.

== Post-football activism ==
Following his retirement, Long became a spokesman for Indigenous Australians. He was a critic of then-Prime Minister John Howard's policies towards Indigenous Australians — most notably Howard's refusal to make an apology to the Stolen Generations. In a letter published in Melbourne's The Age, Long likened Howard to "those cold-hearted pricks" who had removed his parents from their families.

=== First Long Walk ===
Long's political activities culminated in a protest march from Melbourne to Canberra, leaving on 21 November 2004. The aim of the walk was to obtain a meeting with the Prime Minister. After ten days of intense media scrutiny of the walk, Prime Minister Howard eventually granted Long a meeting, at which point Long called an end to the walk, having completed half (about 325 kilometres (202 mi) of the planned 650-kilometre (400 mi)) of the walk. He later said: "I wanted to make a change. It was about challenging the government about some of the issues Aboriginal people were facing and still face – education, employment, health, housing, the Stolen Generations."

The walk became known as The Long Walk, and the tradition of a commemorative community walk in Melbourne has continued, with thousands turning out for the event. The walk takes place in late May or early June before the annual Dreamtime at the 'G match, starting at Federation Square and ending at the MCG. Long is patron of The Long Walk, an organisation inspired by his walk and which works for the health and wellbeing of Indigenous Australians.

=== Second Long Walk ===
In August 2023 Long began a 650-kilometre (400 mi) walk between Melbourne and Canberra, this time in support of the forthcoming Australian Indigenous Voice referendum. He completed the walk after 20 days, arriving at Parliament House in Canberra on 14 September. He reported that he had experienced "overwhelming support" from people he met in regional Australia.

== Other activities and roles ==
In July 2011, Long signed up as ambassador for weight-loss agency Jenny Craig, partly to highlight Indigenous health.

In 2015, he became board member of the newly founded Michael Long Foundation (MLF), and in 2016 the Michael Long Learning and Leadership Centre (MLLLC) opened in Darwin. MLF funds education and football programs for indigenous people, and the MLLLC, funded by the federal government and managed by AFL Northern Territory, aims to nurture talent and improve lives and communities.

== Recognition, honours and awards ==
In 2002, an Essendon panel ranked Long at number 23 in their Champions of Essendon list of the 25 greatest players ever to have played for Essendon.

Long was awarded the Medal of the Order of Australia in the 2021 Queen's Birthday Honours, for "service to Australian rules football, and to the Indigenous community".

He received the 2025 NAIDOC lifetime achievement award.

== Personal life ==
Long is renowned for his sharp wit. In an incident recalled by Long's only VFL/AFL coach, Kevin Sheedy, there was a fundraiser to reconstruct Windy Hill that was under way, and Sheedy was conducting a serious training session in front of a whiteboard and 200 people, mostly money donors. He paused to ask if anyone had a question. To the surprise of all that knew him, Long, who apparently hadn't spoken up during a training session in five years, raised his hand, causing people to fall silent to hear Long speak. Long asked, "What was wrong with the blackboard?"

In 2006, Long was charged with assaulting a man at a football club function in Darwin. He pleaded guilty when the case came to trial in 2009, saying he had struck a man who had attacked his sister. No conviction was recorded, with the magistrate saying that he was unlikely to reoffend.

In 2018, Long was treated for a life-threatening infectious disease, melioidosis, in a hospital in Darwin; however, this did not stop him from announcing plans for a second Long Walk, as he was honoured for the Sir Doug Nicholls Round at Dreamtime at the 'G in May 2019.

== Playing statistics ==
Legend
G	Goals	K	Kicks	D	Disposals	T	Tackles
B	Behinds	H	Handballs	M	Marks
#	Played in that season's premiership team

Season	Team	No.	Games	Totals							Averages (per game)							
Season	Team	No.	Games	G	B	K	H	D	M	T	G	B	K	H	D	M	T	
1989	Essendon	4	24	19	10	233	203	436	68	63	0.8	0.4	9.7	8.5	18.2	2.8	2.6	8
1990	Essendon	4	25	13	9	221	184	405	58	51	0.5	0.4	8.8	7.4	16.2	2.3	2.0	5
1991	Essendon	13	18	13	6	170	132	302	26	34	0.7	0.3	9.4	7.3	16.8	1.4	1.9	6
1992	Essendon	13	17	13	8	182	157	339	56	34	0.8	0.5	10.7	9.2	19.9	3.3	2.0	7
1993^{#}	Essendon	13	18	12	4	228	188	416	72	40	0.7	0.2	12.7	10.4	23.1	4.0	2.2	1
1994	Essendon	13	0	—	—	—	—	—	—	—	—	—	—	—	—	—	—	
1995	Essendon	13	22	27	18	294	221	515	80	40	1.2	0.8	13.4	10.0	23.4	3.6	1.8	16
1996	Essendon	13	2	2	0	9	6	15	1	2	1.0	0.0	4.5	3.0	7.5	0.5	1.0	0
1997	Essendon	13	5	4	6	37	39	76	19	3	0.8	1.2	7.4	7.8	15.2	3.8	0.6	2
1998	Essendon	13	9	9	4	54	60	114	30	9	1.0	0.4	6.0	6.7	12.7	3.3	1.0	2
1999	Essendon	13	20	12	12	223	122	345	62	27	0.6	0.6	11.2	6.1	17.3	3.1	1.4	9
2000^{#}	Essendon	13	23	18	18	230	135	365	72	59	0.8	0.8	10.0	5.9	15.9	3.1	2.6	2
2001	Essendon	13	7	1	4	42	30	72	16	16	0.1	0.6	6.0	4.3	10.3	2.3	2.3	0
Career			190	143	99	1923	1477	3400	560	378	0.8	0.5	10.1	7.8	17.9	2.9	2.0	58

== Honours and achievements ==
=== AFL ===
==== Team ====
- 2× AFL premiership player (Essendon): 1993, 2000
- 5× McClelland Trophy (Essendon): 1989, 1993, 1999, 2000, 2001
- 2× NTFL premiership player (St Mary's): 1986–1987, 1987–1988

==== Individual ====
- Norm Smith Medal: 1993
- Essendon Captain: 1999
- 2× All-Australian team: 1988, 1995
- State of Origin (Northern Territory): 1988
- State of Origin (QLD/NT): 1993
- Essendon Team of the Century 1896-1997 – Wing
- Australian Football League Indigenous Team of the Century 1904-2003 – Wing
- Northern Territory Team of the Century – Wing
- Australian Football Hall of Fame - 2007 Inductee
- West Torrens Football Club – Best & Fairest: 1988

=== Other ===
- National NAIDOC Lifetime Achievement Award 2025
