= Thomas Baulch =

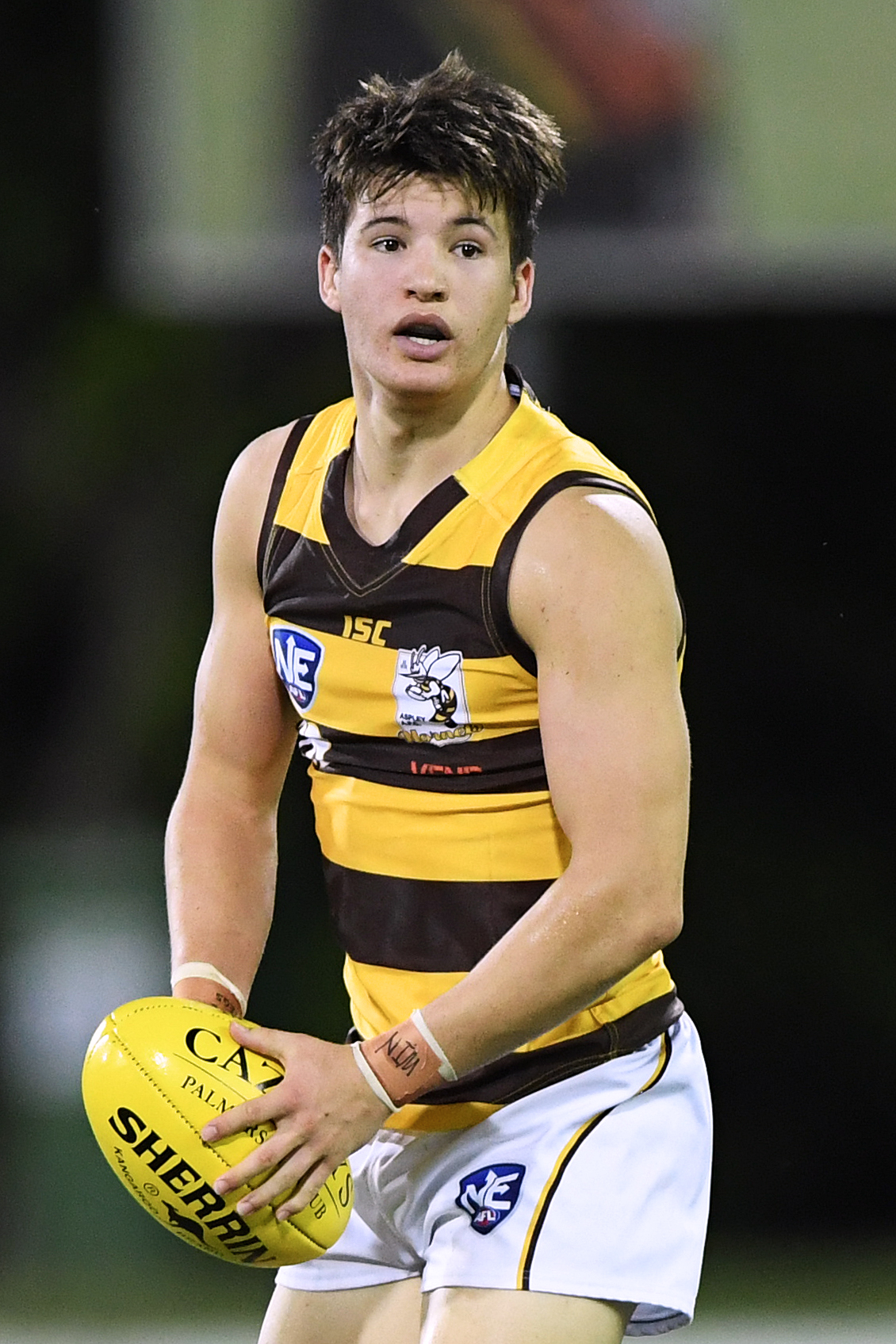
- Baulch playing for Aspley in 2019

Personal information
- Full name: Thomas William Baulch
- Born: 26 November 1999 (age 26); Gladstone, Queensland, Australia
- Original teams: Kojonup Magpies; Mackay City Hawks
- Height: 185 cm (6 ft 1 in)
- Weight: 85 kg (187 lb)
- Position: Midfielder-forward
- Other occupation: Social media personality

Thomas William Baulch (born 26 November 1999) is an Australian social media personality and Australian rules footballer. He is the founder and CEO of Prime Train, a fitness business he began in 2020.

As of October 2023, he has more than 450,000 followers on social media, including 280,000 on TikTok.

== Football career ==
=== Early life and junior career ===
Baulch was born in Gladstone and grew up in Kojonup, Western Australia, playing football for Kojonup Cougars. He moved to Queensland and played for the Mackay City Hawks as a junior and spent several years in the Gold Coast Suns Academy development program. In 2017, Baulch moved to Perth and joined East Perth in the West Australian Football League (WAFL) Colts competition, playing 20 games over two seasons.

=== State league career ===
In 2019, Baulch relocated to Brisbane and signed with Aspley in the North East Australian Football League (NEAFL), kicking nine goals in 15 games. Following the league's disbandment, he remained with Aspley for their transition into the Victorian Football League (VFL) for the 2021 season. He played five matches in the VFL, recording a best of 25 disposals and two goals against Southport.

Later in 2021, Baulch joined Darwin in the Northern Territory Football League (NTFL). He gained significant media attention in February 2022 during a match against Southern Districts when he was filmed drinking a beer handed to him by a spectator while on the field. The incident went viral, resulting in a two-week suspension from the NTFL.

=== Amateur and exhibition football ===
Following his state league career, Baulch began touring as a player for various local clubs, leveraging his social media following. He has played for Wangaratta Rovers in the Ovens & Murray Football Netball League, and in 2024 played in the AFL London competition. He also participated in the 2025 E. J. Whitten Legends Game.

As of June 2024, Baulch has played for at least 16 different clubs in a dozen different leagues.

== Media and business career ==
Baulch founded Prime Train in 2020, a fitness business for Australian rules footballers. Clients have included Brownlow Medalists Patrick Cripps and Tom Mitchell, with Baulch as CEO.

In January 2026, Baulch posted a video to Instagram urging his male followers to unfollow female influencers, equating the practice to pornography usage. The Herald Sun described the video as a "dangerous anti-women rant" and criticized the content for promoting toxic masculinity to an impressionable audience.
