= 1917–18 NTFL season =

- Teams: 3
- Premiers: Wanderers; 2nd premiership
- Minor premiers: Wanderers; 2nd minor premiership

The 1917–18 NTFL season was the second season of the Northern Territory Football League (NTFL). The Wanderers won the premiership back to back for finishing on top of the ladder after the home and away season. There were no finals until 1918–19.
