= 1984–85 NTFL season =

64th season of the NTFL

- Teams: 6
- Premiers: St Marys; 12th premiership
- Minor premiers: St Marys; 13th minor premiership
- Wooden spooners: Waratah; 19th wooden spoon

The 1984–85 NTFL season was the 64th season of the Northern Territory Football League (NTFL).

St Marys have completed a perfect season and claim there 12th premiership title while defeating the Wanderers Eagles in the grand final by 13 points.

== Grand Final ==
1984–85 NTFL Grand Final
1985 | St Marys | def. | Wanderers
3.4 (22); 7.7 (49); 12.11 (83); 13.20 (98) | Q1; Q2; Q3; Final | 2.1 (13); 6.5 (41); 8.6 (54); 13.7 (85)
This was the first time when St Marys completed a season undefeated.
