= St Mary's Football Club (NTFL) =

St Mary's

Names
- Full name: St Marys Football Club
- Nickname(s): Saints, Green Machine
- Motto: "Recte Ad Metam"

2025/26 season
- After finals: 2nd
- Home-and-away season: 2nd
- Leading goalkicker: Jackson Calder (72)
- Best and fairest: Dylan Landt

Club details
- Founded: 1952; 74 years ago
- Colours
- Competition: Northern Territory Football League
- President: Adrian Moscheni
- Coach: Anthony Vallejo
- Captain: Dylan Landt
- Premierships: NTFL (34): 1954/55, 1955/56, 1958/59, 1959/60, 1961/62, 1965/66, 1966/67, 1971/72, 1977/78, 1978/79, 1983/84, 1984/85, 1985/86, 1986/87, 1987/88, 1989/90, 1990/91, 1991/92, 1993/94, 1994/95, 1995/96, 1996/97, 2002/03, 2003/04, 2004/05, 2007/08, 2008/09, 2009/10, 2012/13, 2013/14, 2015/16, 2016/17, 2021/22, 2023/24
- Ground: TIO Stadium (capacity: 14,000)

Uniforms
Home

The St Marys Football Club, nicknamed, Saints, formed in 1952, is an Australian rules football club, affiliated to the Northern Territory Football League. It is famous for its record of success, with 34 NTFL premierships in 53 Grand Finals and 69 out of 72 possible final appearances. To the end of season 2023/24, St Marys have played 1336 games for 961 Wins 362 Losses and 11 Draws and 2 N/R.

Nicknamed the Saints, St Marys play their home games at Football Park in Marrara.

St Marys has produced many talented players, particularly Indigenous Australian players for leagues such as the Australian Football League. Many players from the Tiwi Bombers Football Club also played for the club.

St Mary's have only missed the NTFL finals three times in their history: 1979/80 (5th), 2000/01 (5th) and 2018/19 (8th). They collected their first wooden spoon in 2018/19, having had the longest wooden spoon drought in NTFL history of 67 years (ahead of Nightcliff's 40 years from 1952/53 until 1992/93).

== Notable players ==
The club has produced AFL players

- Maurice Rioli - Richmond
- Michael Long - Essendon
- Ronnie Burns - Geelong, Adelaide
- Scott Chisolm - Fremantle, Melbourne
- Xavier Clarke - St Kilda, Brisbane Lions
- Raphael Clarke - St Kilda
- Peter Burgoyne - Port Adelaide
- Cyril Rioli - Hawthorn
- Daniel Rioli - Richmond
- Shaun Edwards - Greater Western Sydney, Essendon, Sydney
- Austin Wonaeamirri - Melbourne
- Ben Long - St Kilda, Gold Coast
- Maurice Rioli Jr - Richmond

== Club achievements ==
Club achievements
Competition	Level	Num.	Year won
Northern Territory Football League	Premiers	34	1954/55, 1955/56, 1958/59, 1959/60, 1961/62, 1965/66, 1966/67, 1971/72, 1977/78, 1978/79, 1983/84, 1984/85, 1985/86, 1986/87, 1987/88, 1989/90, 1990/91, 1991/92, 1993/94, 1994/95, 1995/96, 1996/97, 2002/03, 2003/04, 2004/05, 2007/08, 2008/09, 2009/10, 2012/13, 2013/14, 2015/16, 2016/17, 2021/22, 2023/24
Northern Territory Football League	Runners Up	21	1960/61, 1962/63, 1963/64, 1967/68, 1968/69, 1969/70, 1970/71, 1972/73, 1976/77, 1981/82, 1982/83, 1992/93, 1997/98, 1998/99, 2005/06, 2010/11, 2014/15, 2019/20, 2020/21, 2024/25, 2025/26
Northern Territory Football League	Minor Premiers	33	1954/55, 1955/56, 1958/59, 1959/60, 1960/61, 1965/66, 1966/67, 1969/70, 1976/77, 1977/78, 1981/82, 1983/84, 1984/85, 1985/86, 1986/87, 1987/88, 1988/89, 1989/90, 1990/91, 1991/92, 1992/93, 1994/95, 1995/96, 1996/97, 2004/05, 2005/06, 2008/09, 2010/11, 2012/13, 2013/14, 2014/15, 2016/17, 2023/24
Northern Territory Football League	Wooden Spoons	1	2018/19

=== NTFL Women's ===
- Premiers (6): 2004/05, 2005/06, 2007/08, 2008/09, 2009/10, 2024/25
- Runners Up (4): 2010/11, 2011/12, 2012/13, 2023/24
- Wooden Spoons (0): Nil

== Club song ==
Chorus:
Oh when the Saints come marching in
Oh When the Saints come marching in
Oh lord I want to be in that number
When the Saints come marching in

(Chorus)

We are travelling the footsteps
Of those who've gone before
But we'll all be reunited
On a new and sunlit shore

(Chorus)

Some days in this world of trouble
Is the only one we need
But I’m waiting for that morning
when the new world is revealed

(Chorus x2)
