= Waratah Football Club =

Waratah

Names
- Full name: Waratah Football Club
- Nickname(s): Warriors; Tahs

2025-26 season
- After finals: 5th
- Home-and-away season: 5th

Club details
- Founded: November 1916; 109 years ago
- Colours
- Competition: Northern Territory Football League
- Premierships: NTFL (16): 1920/21, 1928/29, 1929/30, 1930/31, 1932/33, 1937/38, 1940/41, 1946/47, 1947/48, 1952/53, 1953/54, 1973/74, 1976/77, 1998/99, 1999/00, 2022/23
- Ground: Gardens Oval

Uniforms
Home	Away

Other information
- Official website: waratahfc.com.au

The Waratah Football Club, nicknamed, Warriors or Tahs, is a member club of the Northern Territory Football League.

== Club achievements ==
Club achievements
Competition	Level	Num.	Year won
Northern Territory Football League	Premiers	16	1920/21, 1928/29, 1929/30, 1930/31, 1932/33, 1937/38, 1940/41, 1946/47, 1947/48, 1952/53, 1953/54, 1973/74, 1976/77, 1998/99, 1999/00, 2022/23
Northern Territory Football League	Runners Up	16	1916/17, 1917/18, 1918/19, 1922/23, 1923/24, 1925/26, 1927/28, 1931/32, 1933/34, 1934/35, 1950/51, 1955/56, 1996/97, 2006/07, 2007/08, 2021/22
Northern Territory Football League	Minor Premiers	4*	Note: These results only show from after 1946. Stats before that year are still on search.; 1946/47, 1952/53, 1998/99, 1999/00
Northern Territory Football League	Wooden Spoons	23	1919/20, 1921/22, 1924/25, 1926/27, 1936/37, 1949/50, 1951/52, 1957/58, 1958/59, 1959/60, 1961/62, 1962/63, 1975/76, 1977/78, 1978/79, 1980/81, 1982/83, 1983/84, 1984/85, 1988/89, 1993/94, 2014/15, 2015/16

=== NTFL Women's ===
- Premiers (8): 2006/07, 2011/12, 2012/13, 2013/14, 2014/15, 2015/16, 2017/18, 2018/19
- Runners Up (6): 2005/06, 2007/08, 2009/10, 2016/17, 2019/20, 2022/23
- Wooden Spoons (0): Nil

== History ==
The club was formed in November 1916, and was one of the original foundation clubs. Waratah is the only Club with an involvement in every year the competition has been played in Darwin.

The Waratah FC has won 16 League Premierships (including 3 consecutive Premierships from 1928/29 to 1930/31) 20 Men's Division 1/ Reserves Premierships and 4 Under 18 Premierships (most recently in 2022/23).

The League side broke a 21-year drought in the 1998/99 season to win the League Premiership and followed this up with a back-to-back Premiership in 1999/2000. The Reserve Grade won the Premiership for 3 consecutive years over this period with Premiership wins in 1997/98, 1998/99 and 1999/2000. The most successful reserves coach for the club being Paul Carroll coaching 12 flags.

The prestigious AFLNT Nichols Medal has been won by 8 legends of the club, with one of these players to have won dual medals. Denis Ganley 1951/52, Bluey McKee 1952/53, Bill James 1953/54, Jim Wilson 1960/61, Bertram Kantilla 1962/63, Keith Nickels 1971/72, Hank McPhee 1979/80, Peter Ivanoff 1981/82 and 1986/87, Timmy Mosquito 2016/17.

Notable Waratah players in the AFL such as Essendon's Dean Rioli and Abbey Holmes.

== Club song ==
It’s a grand old flag
It’s a high flying flag
It’s an emblem for which we will fight
It’s the emblem of the team we love
The team of the red and the white
Every eye gleams bright
For the red and the white
As we sing this song to you
Should auld acquaintance be forgot
Keep your eye on the red and the white.
