= Wanderers Football Club =

Wanderers

Names
- Full name: Wanderers Football Club
- Nickname: Eagles

2025–26 season
- After finals: DNQ
- Home-and-away season: 8th

Club details
- Founded: 1916; 110 years ago
- Colours
- Competition: NTFL
- Premierships: NTFL (12): 1916/17, 1917/18, 1918/19, 1919/20, 1922/23, 1923/24, 1957/58, 1981/82, 1982/83, 1992/93, 2010/11, 2014/15
- Ground: TIO Stadium

Uniforms
Home

The Wanderers Football Club, nicknamed, Eagles, is an Australian rules football club, currently playing in the Northern Territory Football League (NTFL).

The club was formed in 1916 as a founding member of the NTFL. It has produced Australian Football League (AFL) players such as Shannon, Daniel and Marlon Motlop, Russell Jeffrey, Mark West, Troy Taylor, Relton Roberts, Steven Motlop and Liam Patrick.

== Club achievements ==
Club achievements
Competition	Level	Num.	Year won
Northern Territory Football League	Premiers	12	1916/17, 1917/18, 1918/19, 1919/20, 1922/23, 1923/24, 1957/58, 1981/82, 1982/83, 1992/93, 2010/11, 2014/15
Northern Territory Football League	Runners Up	14	1920/21, 1921/22, 1924/25, 1948/49, 1949/50, 1951/52, 1988/89, 1984/85, 1988/89, 2004/05, 2008/09, 2013/14, 2015/16, 2016/17
Northern Territory Football League	Minor Premiers	3*	Note: These results only show from after 1946 and the first two seasons. Otherstats before 1946 are still on search.; 1916/17, 1917/18, 1982/83
Northern Territory Football League	Wooden Spoons	28	1930/31, 1931/32, 1932/33, 1933/34, 1935/36, 1946/47, 1953/54, 1954/55, 1955/56, 1956/57, 1963/64, 1964/65, 1965/66, 1966/67, 1967/68, 1968/69, 1969/70, 1970/71, 1971/72, 1976/77, 1979/80, 1989/90, 1997/98, 1998/99, 1999/00, 2000/01, 2001/02, 2007/08

=== NTFL Women's ===
- Premiers (0): Nil
- Runners Up (1): 2015/16
- Wooden Spoons (3): 2022/23, 2023/24, 2024/25

== Club song ==
If you are a Wanderer, then sing along with me
We are the Eagles on the road to victory
All for one and one for all, will answer to the call
We're the greatest team of all

Good ol' Wanderers forever
We will always stick together
We will always do the bestest we do
For the good ol Gold and Blue!
