= Tiwi Bombers Football Club =

Tiwi Bombers

Names
- Full name: Tiwi Bombers Football Club
- Nickname: Bombers

2025-26 season
- After finals: DNQ
- Home-and-away season: 6th

Club details
- Founded: 2006; 20 years ago
- Colours
- Competition: Northern Territory Football League
- Premierships: NTFL (1): 2011/12
- Ground: Stanley Tipiloura Oval, Wurrumiyanga

Uniforms
Home

Other information
- Official website: tiwibombers.com

The Tiwi Bombers Football Club is an Australian rules football club, currently competing in the Northern Territory Football League.

The club is notable as being the first all-Aboriginal team to play in a major competition.

The team is affiliated with the Essendon Football Club, where two famous Tiwi Island products Michael Long and Dean Rioli played their football in the national Australian Football League (AFL). Essendon provided jumpers for the team and the team adopted the "Bombers" moniker. The team's initial name was Tiwi Storm.

AFL players Austin Wonaeamirri, Dean Rioli, Willie Rioli and Anthony McDonald-Tipungwuti have played for the club.

The Bombers have won one premiership in the Leagues history from the 2011/12 season. Deafting the minor premiers, Nightcliff Tigers in the grand final by 14 points.

== Club achievements ==
Club achievements
Competition	Level	Num.	Year won
Northern Territory Football League	Premiers	1	2011/12
Northern Territory Football League	Runners Up	2	2009/10, 2012/13
Northern Territory Football League	Minor Premiers	1	2009/10
Northern Territory Football League	Wooden Spoons	4	2016/17, 2020/21, 2021/22, 2022/23

=== NTFL Women's ===
- Premiers (0): Nil
- Runners Up (0): Nil
- Minor Premiers (0): Nil
- Wooden Spooners (1): 2025/26

== NTFL Men's Premier League Season's ==
=== 2006–07 season ===
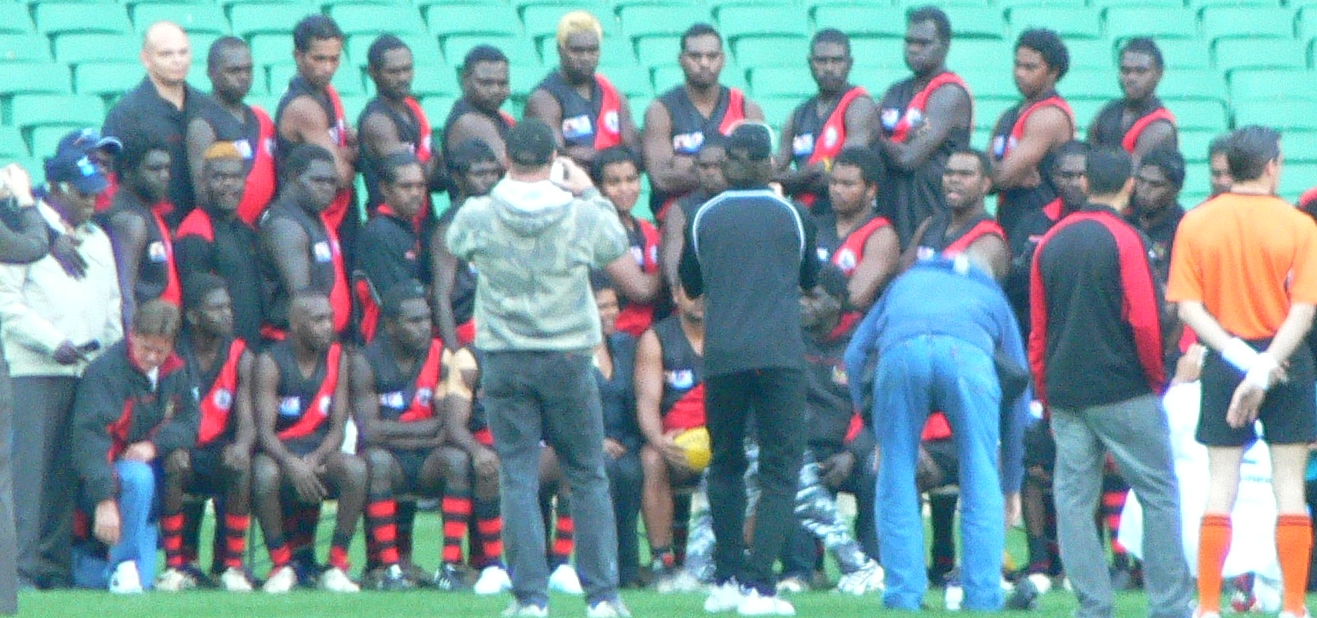
The Tiwi Bombers team line-up for a historic match against Rumbalara at the Melbourne Cricket Ground as a curtain raiser to the "Dreamtime at the 'G" game. The Bombers defeated their Victorian opponents by a massive margin, posting a near ground record score.

The club won six out of seven "trial" games in its inaugural restricted season, many of the six wins by significant margins displaying a trademark play-on at all costs fast-paced style. Their only defeat was to the eventual NTFL premiers, Southern Districts Football Club, by a small margin.

All of the club's matches were featured nationally on ABC2, a special feature as part of the NTFL's television coverage. However they defeated the NTFL premiers later in the season in a friendly "mini-Grand Final" rematch.

It was announced early in 2007 that the team would become a permanent part of the NTFL competition in the 07/08 season, although some Tiwi Islands players will be unavailable to play for the Bombers due to contracts to other NTFL clubs.

=== 2007–08 season ===
In the off season, the club recruited several players from the Southport Sharks in the Queensland State League to boost their height and key position strength.

In the club's maiden season (their first season after the trial season), they started with promise, winning many of their early games and sitting on top of the ladder by mid season.

However injuries and player losses took their toll and the Bombers experienced a form slump later in the season. They recovered in the last few rounds to keep a finals berth. Finishing high on the ladder gave them several chances to reach the Grand Final. However, after losing their qualifying final to St Marys, the Bombers lost the first semi-final to Waratah, extinguishing their aspirations for a flag in their maiden season. Some cited the lack of a reserves side as a factor in their up and down season.

=== 2017-18 season ===
The Bombers bounced back from a wooden spoon in 2016/17 to finish 5th in 2017/18, losing their elimination final to St Mary's. New coach Brenton Toy was instrumental to their success as well as a number of key players including Dion Munkara and Ross Tungatalum.

== NTFL Women's Premier League ==
The Tiwi Bombers joined the Women's Premier League in the 2022/23 season after when Tracy Village were relegated the previous season. They finished on bottom and were award the wooden spoon in the 2025/26 season.
