= Palmerston Football Club =

Palmerston

Names
- Full name: Palmerston Football Club
- Nickname: Magpies

2025-26 season
- After finals: DNQ
- Home-and-away season: 9th (Wooden Spooners)

Club details
- Founded: 1970; 56 years ago
- Colours
- Competition: Northern Territory Football League
- President: Carmine Rauseo
- Coach: Mark Tyrell
- Captain: Shaun Wilson
- Premierships: NTFL (3): 1980/81, 2000/01, 2001/02
- Ground: Cazalys Oval (capacity: 700+)

Uniforms
Home

Other information
- Official website: palmerstonmagpies.com.au

The Palmerston Football Club, nicknamed, Magpies, is an Australian rules football club, currently playing in the Northern Territory Football League. They were first called Internationals before entering the NTFL, then they were called North Darwin from the 1972/73 to 1995/96 season.

== Club achievements ==
Club achievements
Competition	Level	Num.	Year won
Northern Territory Football League	Premiers	3	1980/81, 2000/01, 2001/02
Northern Territory Football League	Runners Up	5	1975/76, 1977/78, 1979/80, 1999/00, 2002/03
Northern Territory Football League	Minor Premiers	4	1980/81, 2000/01, 2001/02, 2002/03
Northern Territory Football League	Wooden Spoons	13	1972/73, 1973/74, 1981/82, 1985/86, 1986/87, 1990/91, 1994/95, 2004/05, 2017/18, 2019/20, 2023/24, 2024/25, 2025/26

=== NTFL Women's ===
- Premiers (1): 2010/11
- Runners Up (1): 2008/09
- Wooden Spoons (1): 2009/10

== History ==
The Palmerston Magpies Football Club began in 1970 and was originally known as the Internationals. At that time most players were English and Greek soccer players. John O'Donoghue and Paul Fricker got them started with John doing the ground work while Paul represented the club at NTFL meetings. In 1971, the club was informed by the NTFL executive to field three teams and to change its name to a more suitable football name, hence Nth Darwin was born.

In 1972 club was renamed North Darwin Football Club, with the club winning a premiership in 1980/81 under the leadership of Coach Ian Smith and Captain John Stokes (father of AFL footballer Mathew Stokes). North Darwin Football Club moved to Palmerston in the 1995/1996 season and became the Palmerston Magpies Incorporated the following season, at which time the club moved to Palmerston to play home games for 1 season at Archer Oval. Following a move back to Marrara as our home ground, the club played in 4 grand finals 1999/2000 to 2002/2003 and won 2 premierships in 2000/2001 and 2001/2002.

Palmerston Magpies is the only club in the NTFL that represents its own City. The City of Palmerston is located 21 km south of Darwin. The Magpies home ground is the Cazalys Oval, a $2 million facility located at Charles Darwin University Palmerston Campus.

The club has produced players for the AFL such as Aaron Davey, Alwyn Davey, Trent Hentschel, Mathew Stokes, Jayden Davey And Alwyn Davey Jnr.

== Club song ==
The song uses the same tune as 'When Johnny Comes Marching Home'.

The Magpies are a mighty club
We Know! We Know!
We're on the way to victory
Let's Go! Let's Go!
We'll Fight!, They'll' Fight! Will show em' our might
We'll do our best for the Black and White
We're mighty proud of the mighty Black and White
We're mighty proud of the mighty Black and White

The Magpies are a mighty club
We Know! We Know!
Let's celebrate our Magpie club
Let's Go! Let's Go!
We'll win the flag, Will show em' our might
We'll do our best for the Black and White
We're mighty proud of the mighty Black and White
We're mighty proud of the mighty Black and White
