= Northern Territory Football League =

Australian rules football competition

- Most recent season or competition: 2025–26 NTFL season
- Sport: Australian rules football
- Founded: 1916
- First season: 1916; 110 years ago
- Administrator: AFL Northern Territory
- No. of teams: 12 (10 premier league, 2 non-premier league )
- Headquarters: Marrara Stadium
- Region: Northern Territory
- Most recent champion: Nightcliff (7th premiership) (2025–26)
- Most titles: St Mary's (34)
- Broadcasters: TV: 7plus (Selected MPL Finals Matches); KommunityTV/NT News; Radio: SEN Radio; ABC Radio Darwin
- Sponsor: Territory Insurance Office
- Website: play.afl/northern-territory/competitions/tio-ntfl

The Northern Territory Football League (NTFL) is an Australian rules football competition, operating in Greater Darwin and the Northern Territory, formerly run by the Northern Territory Football League Incorporated and, since 3 September 2001, is a business name of the AFL Northern Territory Limited. The NTFL is currently branded "TIO NTFL" under sponsorship naming rights held by Allianz, which owns the Territory Insurance Office (TIO). It operates a semi-professional senior men's competition as well as competitions for women and underagers (U11-U17.5 boys and girls).

It is one of few (and the highest level) Australian men's football competitions played during the Australian Summer with the season beginning in October and ending in March, because cricket cannot be played during the wet season, due to high levels of rain, resulting in the football and cricket seasons being swapped. It regularly attracts high-profile semi-professional players from interstate competitions due to its lack of salary cap and the timing of the season, which allows players to play extra matches during the off-season of other competitions. While most other Australian football competitions in Australia operate during the southern hemisphere winter, the NTFL chooses to play in the Northern Territory's 'wet season' from October to March, primarily due to hard playing surfaces and the need to play cricket during the 'dry season'.

== History ==
The NTFL was founded in 1916 with The Wanderers Football Club and Waratah Football Club as founding members. Waratahs are the only club to have competed in every season of the NTFL. Darwin (Buffalos Football Club) was formed in 1917, Nightcliff in 1950, St Marys in 1952, Palmerston in 1972 (as North Darwin), Southern Districts in 1987 and the Tiwi Bombers in 2006 (with full entry in 2007).

The 1974-75 season was abandoned due to the devastation from Cyclone Tracy.

In the 1990s, it ran into financial problems, primarily due to the Northern Territory government luring the league to the new purpose-built stadium at Marrara Oval after its construction in 1991. The move pushed its operating costs up drastically despite contrary promises from the NT government. On 3 September 2001, the businesses of the formerly independent Northern Territory Football League Incorporated, which had overseen Australian Football in the NT since 1917, were taken-over by the Melbourne-based Australian Football League (AFL), causing disquiet among supporters of Australian Football in the Northern Territory. The Northern Territory Football League Incorporated was subsequently wound-up and de-registered on 19 September 2002, ending its long history and local control of Australian Football. The name, Northern Territory Football League is now owned by the AFL and licensed to AFL NT as a registered business name. NTFL board member Darryl Window orchestrated the takeover.

During its history, it has exported successful players to other Australian football competitions and leagues, notable players have included Michael McLean, Maurice Rioli and Michael Long.

In 2006, it was announced that a team representing the Tiwi Islands, called the Super Tiwis would be added to the 2006/07 season for eight games against teams that would normally have the bye. They became a permanent part of the competition in the 07/08 season as the Tiwi Bombers, clad in Essendon Football Club style guernseys of black and red.

There was also a push for an NTFL representative club to compete in the Adelaide-based South Australian National Football League (SANFL). The first of a series of trial matches was held in 2006, with a long term view of admitting a Darwin side into the SANFL. A strong crowd at Marrara Oval witnessed SANFL club North Adelaide defeat a composite NTFL squad by 27 points, demonstrating that a Darwin team could be competitive. There was a push to make the event an annual match, however, the NTFL decided on fielding a side in the AFL Queensland State League from 2009 (which became the Northern Conference of the North East Australian Football League in 2011) and the Northern Territory Football Club was formed.

In 2010 it was decided to merge the NTFL with the Top End Australian Football Association (TEAFA) to create a three division competition in which the NTFL would make the premier League whilst the NTFL reserve competition and clubs from the TEAFA would incorporate the First Division and Second Divisions.

The 2012/2013 season saw Banks Bulldogs and the Central Australian Football Club placed on a four-match trial in the premier League, for possible full-time inclusion. The Bulldogs, originally a part of the TEAFA competition, would stay in the NTFL Division One competition. But the CAFC team would continue their trial run in the premier League, the number of games extended to 10 for the 2013/2014 season. However, the side did not become a permanent team in the competition.

In advance of the 2026/27 season, AFLNT announced that Banks Bulldogs will be granted a license to compete in the Premier League competitions.

== Competition structure ==
The competition consists of both junior and senior divisions.

The A Grade competition is known as the NTFL Premier League and has ten clubs: Banks, Darwin, Nightcliff, Palmerston, PINT, Southern Districts, St Mary's, Tiwi Bombers, Wanderers, and Waratah.

The men's reserves are divided into three divisions known as Men's Premier League Reserves (B Grade), Division 1 (C Grade), and Division 2 (D Grade): Premier League Reserves consists of all Premier League teams except Tiwi. Divisions 1 and 2 include thirds teams of the premier League clubs, except for the Tiwi Bombers (Palmerston are affiliated with former TEAFA club University), along with the senior teams of two other clubs which were formerly in the TEAFA competition in Tracy Village and the Jabiru Bombers.

The Women's Premier League competition has consisted of the ten Premier League clubs since 2026. Division 1 (B Grade) and 2 (C Grade) Women's hold the reserves for Women's Premier League (some sides) with the addition of Tracy Village and Jabiru.

The junior division is broken into age groups: Under 17.5's, Under 15's, Under 13's, Under 11's, and Under 9's with Boys and Girls divisions across all and Under 11's and 9's having mixed divisions. The junior divisions team numbers vary based on participation levels each year. There are eleven clubs with juniors, the ten Premier League clubs, and Tracy Village.

== Clubs ==
Location of participating clubs across the Northern Territory
Location of participating clubs in Greater Darwin urban area

=== Current clubs ===
Club	Colours	Nickname	Home Ground	2026/27 Senior Grades		Former League	Est.	Years in NTFL	Senior Premierships	
Club	Colours	Nickname	Home Ground	Men	Women	Former League	Est.	Years in NTFL	Total	Most recent
Banks		Bulldogs	Gardens Oval, The Gardens	Premier, Prem. Reserves, Div. 1	Premier, Div. 1, Div. 2	TEAFA	1978	1978-1981, 2011-	7	2025/26
Darwin		Buffaloes	Woodroffe Oval, Woodroffe	Premier, Prem. Reserves, Div. 2	Premier, Div. 2	–	1916	1917-	23	2005/06
Jabiru		Bombers	Brockman Oval, Jabiru	Div. 1, Div. 2	Div. 2	TEAFA	1982	2011-	2	2025/26
Nightcliff		Tigers	Nightcliff Bendigo Community Bank Oval, Nightcliff	Premier, Prem. Reserves, Div.1, Div. 2 (Spartans)	Premier, Div. 1, Div. 2	–	1950	1950-	7	2025/26
Palmerston		Magpies	Cazaly's Arena, Durack	Premier, Prem. Reserves, Div. 1	Premier, Div. 1, Div. 2	–	1972	1972-	3	2001/02
PINT		Greenants	DXC Arena, Marrara	Premier, Prem. Reserves, Div. 1	Premier, Div. 2	TEAFA	1981	2011-	2	2021/22
Southern Districts		Crocs	Norbuilt Oval, Freds Pass	Premier, Prem. Reserves, Div. 1, Div. 2	Premier, Div. 1	TEAFA	1981	1987-	4	2024/25
St Mary's		Saints	Marrara Oval, Marrara	Premier, Prem. Reserves, Div. 2 (Sharks)	Premier, Div. 1	–	1952	1952-	34	2023/24
Tiwi		Bombers	Stanley Tipiloura Oval, Wurrumiyanga	Premier	Premier	–	2006	2007-	1	2011/12
Tracy Village		Razorbacks	Tracy Village Oval, Lyons	Div. 1, Div. 2	Div. 1	TEAFA	1978	1978-1981, 2011-	3	2023/24
Wanderers		Eagles	Marrara Oval, Marrara	Premier, Prem. Reserves, Div. 2	Premier, Div. 2	–	1916	1916-	12	2014/15
Waratah		Warriors	Gardens Oval, The Gardens	Premier, Prem. Reserves, Div. 2	Premier, Div. 1	–	1916	1916-	16	2022/23

== Uniforms ==
Banks	Darwin	Jabiru	Nightcliff	Palmerston	PINT
Southern Districts	St Marys	Tiwi Islands	Tracy Village	Wanderers	Waratah

== Former clubs ==
=== Former Premier League clubs ===
Club	Colours	Nickname	Home ground	Est.	Years in NTFL	NTFL Senior Premierships		Fate
Club	Colours	Nickname	Home ground	Est.	Years in NTFL	Total	Years	Fate
AIF Regiment-Artillery				1941	1941/42	0	-	Folded after 1941/42 season
Air Force				1938	1938/39-1941/42, 1946/47	0	-	Recess between 1942-45. Folded after 1946/47 season
Army/Navy				1947	1947/48	0	-	Folded after 1947/48 season
Army/Air Force				1948	1948/49	0	-	Folded after 1948/49 season
Garrison		Soldiers, Keros		1934	1934/35-1940/41	2	1936/37, 1938/39	Folded after 1940/41 season
Katherine		Roos		1987	1987/88	0	-	Folded after 1987/88 season, later formed Big Rivers Football League
Machine Gunners				1941	1941/42	0	-	Folded after 1941/42 season
Mobile Force				1939	1939/40	1	1939/40	Folded after 1939/40 season
Navy				1941	1941/42, (re:1948/49)	0	-	Folded after 1948/49 season
Navy				1946	1946/47	0	-	Folded after 1946/47 season
Rovers/Magpies		Magpies		1925	1925/26	1	1927/28	Folded after 1928/29 season
Services				1949	1949/50	0	-	Folded after 1950/51 season
Wallabies		Wallabies		1935	1935/36	0	-	Folded after 1935/36 season
Winnellie				1947	1947/48	0	-	Folded after 1947/48 season

=== Other former clubs ===
Club	Colours	Nickname	Home Ground	Former league	Est.	Years in NTFL	NTFL Senior Premierships		Fate
Club	Colours	Nickname	Home Ground	Former league	Est.	Years in NTFL	Total	Most recent	Fate
Combined Services		Services		TEAFA	1978	2010/11	0	-	Folded after 2010/11 season
Mindil		Sharks	Gardens Oval No 2, The Gardens	TEAFA	1991	2010/11-2018/19	0	-	Absorbed by St Mary's after 2018/19 season
Olympic		Spartans	Gardens Oval No 2, The Gardens	TEAFA		2010/11-2014/15	2	2014	Absorbed by Nightcliff after 2014/15 season
University		Rats	Marrara Oval No 2, Marrara	TEAFA	1989	2010/11-2021/22	1	2013	Absorbed by Palmerston after 2021/22 season

=== Northern Territory Football League club songs ===
Club	Colours	Nickname	Club song	Basis/tune of club song
Banks		Bulldogs	Dogs Of The North	Sons Of The Sea
Darwin		Buffaloes	Old Buffaloes Never Die	Shuffle Off To Buffalo
Jabiru		Bombers		
Nightcliff		Tigers	We're From Tigerland	Row, Row, Row From Ziegfeld Follies
Palmerston		Magpies	The Magpies Are A Mighty Club	When Johnny Comes Marching Home
PINT		Greenants		
Southern Districts		Crocs	The Red, Black And White	Notre Dame March
St Mary's		Saints	When The Saints Go Marching In	When The Saints Go Marching In
Tiwi Bombers		Bombers	Japparika	Original
Tracy Village		Razorbacks	So Join In The Chorus	Just a wee Deoch an Doris
Wanderers		Eagles	Good Ol' Wanderers Forever	Battle Hymn Of The Republic
Waratah		Warriors	It's A Grand Old Flag	You're A Grand Old Flag

== Coverage ==
=== Media ===
==== Television ====
In 2006, NTFL premier league matches were broadcast nationally for the first time ever on ABC2 each Sunday afternoon from February to March. Previously the matches had only been shown in the Territory on ABC Darwin. In 2008, it reverted to local broadcasting. During the 2014/15 season, the Saturday 3.00pm premier league match was broadcast live on ABC in Darwin. During the 2017/18 season, Southern Cross TV broadcast one game a week on Sunday afternoons. Previously, National Indigenous Television (NITV) broadcast replays of one game a week throughout the week starting Sunday afternoons. KommunityTV (NT News) has broadcast all Men's Premier League matches and one Women's Premier League match per week, with the most recent agreement signed until the conclusion of the 2023/24 season.

7Plus has streamed selected Men's Premier League Finals Matches in the 2023/24, and 2024/25 Seasons.

==== Radio ====
During the 2014/15 season, one premier league match was broadcast on ABC Local Radio, the match was either the late or early Saturday game and was an alternate match to the TV-broadcast game. In 2017/18, ABC continued to broadcast one game a week on the digital radio frequency 105.7FM with a commentary team including Dominic McCormack, Natasha Medbury and Kieran Davis. Starting in the 2021/22 season, SEN started radio broadcasts for some NTFL Premier League games.

==== Internet ====
Internet broadcasting commenced through YouTube during the 2012/2013 season, followed by its inclusion on the ABC iView on-demand service the 2013/2014 season which uses the recordings taken from the match day broadcast. The TV broadcast match was simulcast live on ABC Grandstand on YouTube during the 2014/15 season. In the 2024/25 season, the AFLNTv YouTube channel live streams some games (excluding Men's Premier League) and posts highlights of broadcast games.

=== Attendance ===
The NTFL attracts strong local crowds. The 2005 Grand final attracted a crowd of over 5,000 people. One of the biggest crowds was the 2010/11 Grand Final between St Mary's and Wanderers, with the Wanderers prevailing with a 28-point win, which attracted an over 9,000 crowd.

== Men Premier League premiership tally ==
Club	Premierships	Runners-up	Premiership years	Runner-up years
St Marys	34	21	1954/55, 1955/56, 1958/59, 1959/60, 1961/62, 1965/66, 1966/67, 1971/72, 1977/78, 1978/79, 1983/84, 1984/85, 1985/86, 1986/87, 1987/88, 1989/90, 1990/91, 1991/92, 1993/94, 1994/95, 1995/96, 1996/97, 2002/03, 2003/04, 2004/05, 2007/08, 2008/09, 2009/10, 2012/13, 2013/14, 2015/16, 2016/17; 2021/22, 2023/24	1960/61, 1962/63, 1963/64, 1967/68, 1968/69, 1969/70, 1970/71, 1972/73, 1976/77, 1981/82, 1982/83, 1992/93, 1997/98, 1998/99, 2005/06, 2010/11, 2014/15, 2019/20, 2020/21, 2024/25, 2025/26
Darwin	23	30	1921/22, 1924/25, 1925/26, 1926/27, 1931/32, 1933/34, 1934/35, 1935/36, 1948/49, 1949/50, 1950/51, 1951/52, 1962/63, 1963/64, 1967/68, 1968/69, 1969/70, 1970/71, 1972/73, 1975/76, 1979/80, 1988/89, 2005/06	1919/20, 1929/30, 1930/31, 1932/33, 1936/37, 1937/38, 1938/39, 1940/41, 1946/47, 1947/48, 1952/53, 1953/54, 1954/55, 1956/57, 1958/59, 1959/60, 1961/62, 1964/65, 1966/67, 1971/72, 1983/84, 1986/87, 1987/88, 1989/90, 1990/91, 1991/92, 1993/94, 1994/95, 2000/01, 2017/18
Waratah	16	16	1920/21, 1928/29, 1929/30, 1930/31, 1932/33, 1937/38, 1940/41, 1946/47, 1947/48, 1952/53, 1953/54, 1973/74, 1976/77, 1998/99, 1999/00, 2022/23	1916/17, 1917/18, 1918/19, 1922/23, 1923/24, 1925/26, 1927/28, 1931/32, 1933/34, 1934/35, 1950/51, 1955/56, 1996/97, 2006/07, 2007/08 2021/22,
Wanderers	12	14	1916/17, 1917/18, 1918/19, 1919/20, 1922/23, 1923/24, 1957/58, 1981/82, 1982/83, 1992/93, 2010/11, 2014/15	1920/21, 1921/22, 1924/25, 1948/49, 1949/50, 1951/52, 1980/81, 1984/85, 1988/89, 2004/05, 2008/09, 2013/14, 2015/16, 2016/17
Nightcliff	7	9	1956/57, 1960/61, 1964/65, 2018/19, 2019/20, 2020/21, 2025/26	1957/58, 1965/66, 1973/74, 1978/79, 1985/86, 2001/02, 2003/04, 2011/12; 2023/24
Southern Districts	4	3	1997/98, 2006/07, 2017/18, 2024/25	1995/96, 2018/19, 2022/23
Palmerston	3	5	1980/81, 2000/01, 2001/02	1975/76, 1977/78, 1979/80, 1999/00, 2002/03
Tiwi Bombers	1	2	2011/12	2009/10, 2012/13
PINT	0	0	N/A	N/A
Banks	0	0	N/A	N/A

== Wooden Spoon tally ==
Club	Total	Season/s
Wanderers	28	1930/31, 1931/32, 1932/33, 1933/34, 1935/36, 1946/47, 1953/54, 1954/55, 1955/56, 1956/57, 1963/64, 1964/65, 1965/66, 1966/67, 1967/68, 1968/69, 1969/70, 1970/71, 1971/72, 1976/77, 1979/80, 1989/90, 1997/98, 1998/99, 1999/00, 2000/01, 2001/02, 2007/08
Waratah	23	1919/20, 1921/22, 1924/25, 1926/27, 1936/37, 1949/50, 1951/52, 1957/58, 1958/59, 1959/60, 1961/62, 1962/63, 1975/76, 1977/78, 1978/79, 1980/81, 1982/83, 1983/84, 1984/85, 1988/89, 1993/94, 2014/15, 2015/16
Darwin	16	1916/17, 1917/18, 1918/19, 1920/21, 1922/23, 1923/24, 1927/28, 1928/29, 1960/61, 1996/97, 2006/07, 2008/09, 2009/10, 2011/12, 2012/13, 2013/14
Palmerston	13	1972/73, 1973/74, 1981/82, 1985/86, 1986/87, 1990/91, 1994/95, 2004/05, 2017/18, 2019/20, 2023/24, 2024/25, 2025/26
Nightcliff	5	1950/51, 1952/53, 1992/93, 1995/96, 2010/11
S. Districts	4	1991/92, 2002/03, 2003/04, 2005/06
Tiwi	4	2016/17, 2020/21, 2021/22, 2022/23
St Marys	1	2018/19
PINT	Nil	N/A
Banks	Nil	N/A

== Women's Premier League ==
The Woman's NTFL competition commenced in 2004 and currently consists of 10 teams.

=== Teams ===
Premier League Clubs

Club	Nickname	Premierships	First Season
Banks	Bulldogs	0	2026/27
Darwin	Buffettes	2 (2016/17, 2021/22)	2004/05
Nightcliff	Tigers	0	2004/05
Palmerston	Magpies	1 (2010/11)	2008/09
PINT	Queenants	4 (2020/21, 2022/23, 2023/24, 2025/26)	2015/16
St Mary's	Saints	6 (2004/05, 2005/06, 2007/08, 2008/09, 2009/10, 2024/25)	2004/05
Southern Districts	Crocs	1 (2019/20)	2005/06
Tiwi Bombers	Bombers	0	2022/23
Wanderers	Eagles	0	2013/14
Waratah	Warriors	8 (2006/07, 2011/12, 2012/13, 2013/14, 2014/15, 2015/16, 2017/18, 2018/19)	2004/05

=== Grand Finals ===
Years	Premiers	GF Score	Runner-up	Date	Location
2004/05	St. Mary's (1)	7.5.47 - 0.3.3	Darwin Buffettes (1)	2005	Marrara Stadium
2005/06	St. Mary's (2)	8.11.59 - 3.2.20	Waratah (1)	2006	Marrara Stadium
2006/07	Waratah (1)	3.1.19 - 2.5.17	Darwin Buffettes (2)	2007	Marrara Stadium
2007/08	St. Mary's (3)	7.2.44 - 5.4.34	Waratah (2)	2008	Marrara Stadium
2008/09	St. Mary's (4)	9.12.66 - 4.4.28	Palmerston Magpies (1)	2009	Marrara Stadium
2009/10	St. Mary's (5)	9.5.59 - 3.6.24	Waratah (3)	2010	Marrara Stadium
2010/11	Palmerston Magpies (1)	6.5.41 - 4.7.31	St. Mary's (1)	2011	Marrara Stadium
2011/12	Waratah (2)	9.8.62 - 2.1.13	St. Mary's (2)	2012	Marrara Stadium
2012/13	Waratah (3)	13.5 (83) - 8.4 (52)	St. Mary's (3)	Saturday, March 9, 2013 (1:15 pm)	Marrara Stadium
2013/14	Waratah (4)	6.7 (43) - 3.6 (24)	Darwin Buffettes (3)	Saturday, March 8, 2014 (4:00 pm)	Marrara Stadium
2014/15	Waratah (5)	9.4 (58) - 0.4 (4)	Tracy Village (1)	Saturday, March 7, 2015 (4:15 pm)	Marrara Stadium
2015/16	Waratah (6)	6.14 (50) - 4.8 (32)	Wanderers (1)	Saturday, March 12, 2016 (4:30 pm)	Marrara Stadium
2016/17	Darwin Buffettes (1)	6.9 (45) - 4.3 (27)	Waratah (4)	Saturday, March 11, 2017 (1:30 pm)	Marrara Stadium
2017/18	Waratah (7)	9.5 (59) - 4.0 (24)	Darwin Buffettes(4)	Saturday, March 10, 2018 (4:30 pm)	Marrara Stadium
2018/19	Waratah (8)	3.3 (21) - 0.3 (3)	Southern Districts (1)	Saturday, March 9, 2019 (4:30 pm)	Marrara Stadium
2019/20	Southern Districts (1)	6.3 (39) - 3.3 (21)	Waratah (5)	Saturday, March 7, 2020 (4:30 pm)	Marrara Stadium
2020/21	PINT (1)	7.4 (46) - 5.5 (35)	Darwin Buffettes (5)	Saturday, March 20, 2021 (4:00 pm)	Marrara Stadium
2021/22	Darwin Buffettes (2)	4.10 (34) - 2.4 (16)	Nightcliff (1)	Saturday, March 19, 2022 (4:00 pm)	Marrara Stadium
2022/23	PINT (2)	12.8 (80) - 6.4 (40)	Waratah (6)	Saturday, March 18, 2023 (4:15 pm)	Marrara Stadium
2023/24	PINT (3)	4.3 (27) - 3.4 (22)	St. Mary's (4)	Saturday, March 16, 2024 (4:15pm)	Marrara Stadium
2024/25	St. Mary's (6)	3.5 (23) - 2.10 (22)	Nightcliff (2)	Saturday, March 15, 2025 (4:15pm)	Marrara Stadium
2025/26	PINT (4)	2.3 (15) - 2.1 (13)	Nightcliff (3)	Saturday, March 14, 2026 (4:15pm)	Marrara Stadium

== See also ==
- AFL Northern Territory
- Australian rules football in the Northern Territory
