= USAFL National Championships =

Championship Tournament for Australian Rules Football in the USA

The USAFL National Championships is a tournament for Australian rules football in the United States.

Since 1997, the National Championships have been a large event featuring teams from the United States and Canada in four men's divisions and two women's divisions. The competition is organized and run by the United States Australian Football League.

== History ==
The first championships were held in Cincinnati in 1997, and they were won by the host Cincinnati Dockers. The Queen City would host the first three Nationals, with the 1998 edition welcoming 10 teams. The 2017 edition saw the largest turnout in the history of the carnival; 53 teams representing 42 clubs across North America took part, including a record 13 women's teams representing 27 USAFL and AFL Canada clubs.

The Denver Bulldogs have been the most successful club at Nationals, winning Men's Division 1 eight times, Women's Division 1 six times, and Men's Division 4 once. The Austin Crows have won the second most titles, picking up their fifth Men's D1 crown in 2021. The New York Magpies, San Diego Lions and Boston Demons are the only other multiple Men's D1 winners, each having won twice.

Canadian clubs were first invited to the USAFL Championships in 2006. The first Canadian champions were the Vancouver Cougars and Calgary Kookaburras in 2008. The Calgary Kangaroos have won four Division 2 premierships while the AFL Quebec Saints have won two.

In 2005, the first USAFL Women's championships were held and were won by the Atlanta Lady Kookaburras. The Lady Kookas took home the first three premierships until 2008, when their 19-game winning streak came to an end at the hands of the Calgary Kookaburras. The Denver Lady Bulldogs then won six consecutive titles from 2010 to 2015, winning 20 consecutive games in the process until losing to the Minnesota Freeze. Their string of premierships ended at the hands of the San Francisco Iron Maidens, who have since gone on to claim seven-in-a-row of their own from 2016 to 2023.

== Format ==
The USAFL tournament seeding committee sets the divisions and seeding of all teams at least two weeks prior to the tournament. Teams are placed in divisions based on season performance, regional championships performance, previous Nationals’ performance, and team player availability. Teams are then seeded within each division, with teams that are geographically close together usually separated by pool to avoid matchups during the season repeating in the group stage. Clubs that aren't able to field full sides are combined with others to ensure that everyone is able to play.

The Men's Division 2 was created for the 1999 tournament, and has been used since 2001. Men's Division 3 was introduced in 2002, and Division 4 was added in 2007. A standalone reserves division was used in 2017, 2018, and 2021. A second women's division was created to accommodate combined teams in 2015, though the women's competition reverted to one division in 2021 due to reduced numbers as a result of the COVID-19 pandemic.

Matches at Nationals are 40 minutes long, which is half the length of a typical full Australian football match. Usually, matches are played as two, twenty-minute halves with no time on. For the 2021 tournament this was changed to four, ten-minute quarters to allow for restrictions surrounding water runners as a result of the COVID-19 pandemic. Finals matches that are tied after forty minutes of play are decided by a five-minute extra time period, followed by golden point rules if the match is still tied.

Each team is guaranteed three games on the weekend, usually two on Saturday and one on Sunday. Each division's Grand Final is played on Sunday afternoon. The Men's Division 1 Grand Final is usually the final game played on the weekend; in 2025, however, the Women's Grand Final was the last to be played, in celebration of the 20th Anniversary of the women's division at Nationals.

The top three men's divisions and women's Division 1 are played as 18-a-side. All teams in Divisions One and men's Division Two must be single entity squads; they may not combine with other teams. Men's Division Three is played as 16-a-side if both teams agree. Division Four is played 14-a-side or 16-a-side, and women's Division two is played 14- or 16-a-side. As of 2017, in all divisions each team is permitted to dress a maximum of 24 players.

All Divisions are subject to the "50-50 Rule", which requires at least half of the players on the field at any one time to be "nationals" of the country that their team represents. Players of other origin are considered "non-nationals." Prior to 2009, the players were designated "Australian" and "non-Australian", with at least half of the players on the field needing to be "non-Australian."

In addition to premiership medals, awards are also given to outstanding players in each division. The Paul Roos Medal, named after the former AFL player and coach and former US Revolution coach, is awarded to each division's Best and Fairest. The Coopers Medal goes to the most consistent player in each division, while the Geoff Cann Medal goes to each of the Grand Final MVP's. The umpires of the Grand Final in each division are each awarded the Hayden Kennedy medal.

=== Locations ===
The USAFL had previously attempted to keep Nationals in the Midwestern part of the United States in order to keep travel costs down for teams on the East and West coasts, and for all teams to be able to bring as many players as they can. At the league's 2014 annual general meeting, USAFL president Denis Ryan stated that he wanted to have the three regions, East, Central, and West, alternate hosting duties.

The 2020 Nationals tournament, originally scheduled for Ontario, California the weekend of October 10–11, was cancelled due to the COVID-19 pandemic. Ontario would later host the 2022 Nationals.

USAFL Nationals host venues
Year	Date	Host city	Venue
2026	October 16-17	Sarasota-Bradenton Metroplitan Area	Premier Sports Campus
2025	October 18-19	Tucson, Arizona	Kino Sports Complex
2024	October 11-12	Austin, Texas	Onion Creek Sports Park
2023	October 14-15	Sarasota/Bradenton, Florida	Premier Sports Campus. Lakewood Ranch
2022	October 11-12	Ontario, California	Silverlakes Sports Park, Norco
2021	October 16-17	Austin, Texas	Onion Creek Sports Park
2020	Cancelled due to the COVID-19 pandemic		
2019	October 12-13	Sarasota/Bradenton, Florida	Premier Sports Campus. Lakewood Ranch
2018	October 13-14	Racine, Wisconsin	Soccer Complex of Racine, Franksville
2017	October 21-22	San Diego, California	Surf Cup Sports Park, Del Mar
2016	October 15-16	Sarasota/Bradenton, Florida	Premier Sports Campus. Lakewood Ranch
2015	October 17-18	Austin, Texas	Onion Creek Sports Park
2014	October 11-12	Dublin, Ohio	Daree Fields
2013	October 19-20	Austin, Texas	Onion Creek Sports Park
2012	October 13-14	Mason, Ohio	Heritage Oak Park
2011	October 7-8	Austin, Texas	Onion Creek Sports Park
2010	October 10-11	Louisville, Kentucky	Champions Park
2009	October 9-10	Mason, Ohio	Heritage Oak Park
2008	October 11-12	Colorado Springs, Colorado	United States Air Force Academy
2007	October 13-14	Louisville, Kentucky	Champions Park
2006	October 7-8	Las Vegas, Nevada	Star Nursery Field at Sam Boyd Stadium
2005	October 1-2	Milwaukee, Wisconsin	Milwaukee Polo Fields, Merton
2004	October 9-10	Atlanta, Georgia	Atlanta Polo Grounds
2003	October 4-5	Kansas City, Missouri	
2002		Kansas City, Missouri	
2001	October 17-18	Washington, DC	Rosecroft Raceway, Fort Washington, Maryland
2000	October 14-15	Los Angeles, California	
1999		Cincinnati, Ohio	
1998		Cincinnati, Ohio	
1997		Cincinnati, Ohio	

== Yearly Results ==
Year	Men's USAFL Div 1 Grand Final				Women's USAFL Div 1 Grand Final			
Year	Premier	G.B (Total)	Runner up	G.B (Total)	Premier	G.B (Total)	Runner up	G.B (Total)
1997	Cincinnati Dockers (1)		Nashville Kangaroos					
1998	Boston Demons (1)	15.7 (97)	Golden Gate Roos	1.1 (7)				
1999	Boston Demons (2)	4.2 (26)	Golden Gate Roos	3.2 (20)				
2000	Denver Bulldogs (1)	3.4 (22)	San Diego Lions	3.2 (20)				
2001	San Diego Lions (1)	10.4 (64)	Boston Demons	2.5 (17)				
2002	Denver Bulldogs (2)	8.1 (49)	San Diego Lions	0.2 (2)				
2003	Denver Bulldogs (3)	8.5 (53)	Boston Demons	1.3 (9)				
2004	Denver Bulldogs (4)	2.6 (18)	New York Magpies	1.1 (7)				
2005	Denver Bulldogs (5)	4.8 (32)	Milwaukee Bombers	1.1 (7)	Atlanta Kookaburras (1)	6.5 (41)	Florida Fusion	2.1 (13)
2006	San Diego Lions (2)	4.9 (33)	Denver Bulldogs	2.0 (12)	Atlanta Kookaburras (2)	3.10 (28)	Pacific Coast Highwayers	0.0 (0)
2007	Denver Bulldogs (6)	3.3 (21)	San Diego Lions	2.3 (15)	Atlanta Kookaburras (3)	7.7 (49)	Arizona Hawks	0.0 (0)
2008	Vancouver Cougars (1)	4.4 (28)	Baltimore Washington Eagles	2.0 (12)	Calgary Kookaburras (1)	4.3 (27)	Atlanta Kookaburras	3.4 (22)
2009	Denver Bulldogs (7)	2.5 (17)	Seattle Grizzlies	2.2 (14)	Milwaukee Bombers (1)	8.3 (51)	Calgary Kookaburras	1.5 (11)
2010	New York Magpies (1)	4.4 (28)	Denver Bulldogs	1.1 (7)	Denver Bulldogs (1)	3.1 (19)	Calgary/Montréal	2.6 (18)
2011	Denver Bulldogs (8)	3.2 (20)	Calgary Kangaroos	0.5 (5)	Denver Bulldogs (2)	3.7 (25)	New York/Montréal	0.1 (1)
2012	Vacated				Denver Bulldogs (3)	3.4 (22)	Boston/Baltimore-Washington	0.0 (0)
2013	Austin Crows (1)	4.2 (26)	Calgary Kangaroos	4.1 (25)	Denver Bulldogs (4)	3.7 (25)	San Francisco Iron Maidens	0.0 (0)
2014	New York Magpies (2)	2.4 (16)	Orange County Bombers	2.1 (13)	Denver Bulldogs (5)	2.3 (15)	San Francisco/Portland/Arizona	0.4 (4)
2015	Austin Crows (2)	4.4 (28)	Orange County Bombers	2.4 (16)	Denver Bulldogs (6)	1st	New York Magpies	2nd
2016	Austin Crows (3)	6.3 (39)	Golden Gate Roos	2.1 (13)	San Francisco Iron Maidens (1)	1st	Denver Bulldogs	2nd
2017	Golden Gate Roos (1)	6.4 (40)	Los Angeles Dragons	2.2 (14)	San Francisco Iron Maidens (2)	2.2 (14)	Denver Bulldogs	1.0 (6)
2018	Austin Crows (4)	4.6 (30)	Golden Gate Roos	4.1 (25)	San Francisco Iron Maidens (3)	3.2 (20)	Seattle Grizzlies	0.0 (0)
2019	Austin Crows (5)	8.3 (51)	Denver Bulldogs	1.2 (8)	San Francisco Iron Maidens (4)	2.2 (14)	Seattle Grizzlies	0.3 (3)
2021	Austin Crows (6)	10.8 (68)	New York Magpies	2.2 (14)	San Francisco Iron Maidens (5)	5.4 (34)	Denver Bulldogs	2.5 (17)
2022	Austin Crows (7)	6.3 (39)	Denver Bulldogs	2.4 (16)	San Francisco Iron Maidens (6)	6.4 (40)	Minnesota Freeze	1.1 (7)
2023	Austin Crows (8)	5.3 (33)	Denver Bulldogs	2.4 (16)	Golden Gate Iron Maidens (7)	2.2 (14)	Minnesota Freeze	1.2 (8)
2024	Austin Crows (9)	8.4 (52)	Denver Bulldogs	4.4 (28)	Minnesota Freeze (1)	6.6 (42)	Golden Gate Iron Maidens	2.0 (12)
2025	Austin Crows (10)	9.4 (58)	New York Magpies	0.2 (2)	Minnesota Freeze (2)	2.1 (13)	Denver Bulldogs	1.1 (7)
2026	Austin Crows (11)	4.6 (30)	Denver Bulldogs	2.4 (16)	Golden Gate Iron Maidens (8)	2.4 (16)	Sacramento Suns	0.1 (1)

Year	Men's USAFL Div 2 Grand Final				Men's USAFL Div 3 Grand Final			
Year	Premier	G.B (Total)	Runner up	G.B (Total)	Premier	G.B (Total)	Runner up	G.B (Total)
1999	Baltimore Washington Eagles	3.4 (22)	Southern Crusaders*	1.4.10				
2001	New York Magpies	3.8 (26)	Atlanta Kookaburras	2.3 (15)				
2002	Orange County Bombers	7.3 (45)	Golden Gate Roos	2.3 (15)	Philadelphia Hawks	3.8 (26)	Milwaukee Bombers	2.2 (14)
2003	Milwaukee Bombers	4.2 (26)	Golden Gate Roos	3.1 (19)	Kansas City Power	6.7 (43)	North Carolina Tigers	0.3 (3)
2004	Arizona Hawks	3.4 (22)	Philadelphia Hawks	3.4 (20)	Cincinnati Dockers	8.5 (53)	Kansas City Power	3.2 (20)
2005	Golden Gate Roos	7.3 (45)	Philadelphia Hawks	1.4 (10)	Minnesota Freeze	4.3 (27)	Baton Rouge Tigers	3.3 (21)
2006	Baltimore Washington Eagles	10.9 (69)	Minnesota Freeze	2.0 (12)	Las Vegas Gamblers	7.5 (47)	Baton Rouge Tigers	5.1 (31)
2007	Minnesota Freeze	3.5 (23)	Seattle Grizzlies	2.2 (14)	Saint Louis Blues	4.7 (31)	Las Vegas Gamblers	2.4 (16)
2008	Seattle Grizzlies	3.4 (22)	Calgary Kangaroos	0.3 (3)	Kansas City Power	3.8 (26)	Austin Crows	1.2 (8)
2009	Calgary Kangaroos	5.8 (38)	Milwaukee Bombers	3.2 (20)	Dallas Magpies	8.3 (51)	Austin Crows	1.2 (8)
2010	Calgary Kangaroos	11.8 (74)	Minnesota Freeze	5.1 (34)	Austin Crows	4.4 (28)	Fort Lauderdale Fighting Squids	2.5 (17)
2011	Dallas Magpies	8.6 (52)	Austin Crows	0.5 (5)	Arizona Hawks	5.2 (32)	Atlanta Kookaburras	3.1 (19)
2012	Minnesota Freeze	1.6 (12)	Los Angeles Dragons	0.3 (3)	Chicago Swans	4.7 (31)	Columbus Jackaroos	3.4 (22)
2013	Columbus Jackaroos	5.5 (35)	Los Angeles Dragons	1.5 (11)	Houston Lonestars	3.5 (23)	Sacramento Suns	0.1 (1)
2014	Los Angeles Dragons	11.3 (69)	Columbus Jackaroos	1.0 (6)	Sacramento Suns	7.1 (43)	Philadelphia Hawks	0.5 (5)
2015	Quebec Saints	3.9 (27)	Sacramento Suns	0.0 (0)	Portland Steelheads	5.7 (37)	Cincinnati Dockers	1.3 (9)
2016	Calgary Kangaroos	6.3 (39)	Columbus Jackaroos	0.3 (3)	Portland Steelheads	7.4 (46)	North Carolina Tigers	3.4 (22)
2017	Quebec Saints	5.6 (36)	Orange County Bombers	1.1 (7)	Seattle Grizzlies	4.3 (27)	San Diego Lions	3.2 (20)
2018	Minnesota Freeze	5.7 (37)	Portland Steelheads	3.0 (18)	Philadelphia Hawks	7.4 (46)	Cincinnati Dockers	3.2 (20)
2019	San Diego Lions	4.4 (28)	Baltimore Dockers	1.4 (10)	Boston Demons	4.2 (26)	Columbus Cats	2.3 (15)
2021	D.C. Eagles	8.0 (48)	Boston Demons	1.5 (11)	Arizona Hawks	6.6 (42)	Oklahoma Okies	2.1 (13)
2022	Boston Demons	5.3 (33)	Sacramento Suns	3.5 (23)	Denver Bulldogs (R)	5.3 (33)	Arizona Hawks	0.3 (3)
2023	Sacramento Suns	4.6 (30)	Seattle Grizzlies	4.3 (27)	Philadelphia Hawks	7.8 (50)	Oklahoma Buffaloes	2.2 (14)
2024	Houston Lonestars	4.1 (25)	Seattle Grizzlies	3.3 (21)	Calgary Kangaroos	7.6 (48)	Chicago Swans	0.2 (2)
2025	Seattle Grizzlies	8.4 (52)	San Diego Lions	2.4 (16)	Boston Demons	8.6 (54)	Arizona Hawks	3.2 (20)
2026	Los Angeles Dragons	3.5 (23)	D.C. Eagles	1.0 (6)	North Texas Devils	3.3 (21)	Columbus Cats	3.2 (20)

Year	Men's USAFL Div 4 Grand Final				Men's USAFL Div 5 (previously reserves) Grand Final			
Year	Premier	G.B (Total)	Runner up	G.B (Total)	Premier	G.B (Total)	Runner up	G.B (Total)
2009	Ohio Valley / St Louis	3.15.33	Orange County / De Moines	2.1.13				
2010								
2011								
2012								
2013								
2014								
2015								
2016	Ohio Valley	8.5.53	Tampa Bay	7.2.44				
2017	Tulsa	6.11.47	New York	0.1.1	Austin	7.6.48	Golden Gate	3.0.18
2018								
2019	Ohio Valley	5.2.32	Des Moines	4.4.38				
2020								
2021	Nashville	6.4.40	North Carolina	3.4.22				
2022	St Louis / Las Vegas		Des Moines					
2023	Jacksonville	4.3.27	Fort Lauderdale	3.5.23	Austin	6.5.41	Golden Gate	1.1.7
2024	Denver	8.2.50	Oklahoma	3.4.22	New York / Wasatch	4.10.34	North Carolina	1.1.7
2025	St Louis	7.10.52	Denver	3.2.20	Maine	3.8.26	North Carolina	1.7.13
2026	Wasatch WarGulls	5.2 (32)	North Carolina Tigers	1.5 (11)	Wisconsin Wombats	6.5 (41)	Charlotte Blue Heelers	0.1 (1)

=== List of USAFL National Championship Premiers (Men) ===
Teams	Premiers	Runner up	Total	Year(s) won	Year(s) lost
Austin Crows	11	0	11	2013, 2015, 2016, 2018, 2019, 2021, 2022, 2023, 2024, 2025, 2026	
Denver Bulldogs	8	7	15	2000, 2002, 2003, 2004, 2005, 2007, 2009, 2011	2006, 2010, 2019, 2022, 2023, 2024, 2026
San Diego Lions	2	3	5	2001, 2006	2000, 2002, 2007
Boston Demons	2	2	4	1998, 1999	2001, 2003
New York Magpies	2	4	6	2010, 2014	2004, 2012, 2021, 2025
Golden Gate Roos	1	4	5	2017	1998, 1999, 2016. 2018
Cincinnati Dockers	1	0	1	1997	
Vancouver Cougars	1	0	1	2008	
Calgary Kangaroos	0	2	2		2011, 2013
Orange County Bombers	0	2	2		2014, 2015
Nashville Kangaroos	0	1	1		1997
Milwaukee Bombers	0	1	1		1997
Baltimore Washington Eagles	0	1	1		2008
Seattle Grizzlies	0	1	1		2009
Los Angeles Dragons	0	1	1		2017

=== List of USAFL National Championship Premiers (Women) ===
Teams	Premiers	Runner up	Total	Year(s) won	Year(s) lost
San Francisco / Golden Gate Iron Maidens	8	3	11	2016, 2017, 2018, 2019, 2021, 2022, 2023, 2026	2013, 2014, 2024
Denver Bulldogs	6	4	10	2010, 2011, 2012, 2013, 2014, 2015	2016, 2017, 2021, 2025
Atlanta Kookaburras	3	1	4	2005, 2006, 2007	2008
Minnesota Freeze	2	2	4	2024, 2025	2022, 2023
Calgary Kookaburras	1	1	2	2008	2009, 2010
Milwaukee Bombers	1	0	1	2009	
New York Magpies	0	2	2		2011, 2015
Seattle Grizzlies	0	2	2		2018, 2019
Florida Fusion	0	1	1		2005
Pacific Coast Highwayers	0	1	1		2006
Arizona Hawks	0	1	1		2007
Boston Demons	0	1	1		2012
Sacramento Suns	0	1	1		2026

*In 2016, the Bulldogs finished second in a round robin where no Grand Final was played.

=== List of All Collegiate National Championships ===
Year	Team	Method of winning	Runner-up	Championship Location (if Applicable)
2003	Vanderbilt Commodores	#1 Ranked at Year End & 2003 Australian Festival Cup Winners in Nashville, TN		
2004	North Carolina Tar Heels	1st US Collegiate Invitational Winners	Vanderbilt Commodores	Centennial Park, Nashville, TN
2008	Saint John's Johnnies	2nd US Collegiate Invitational Winners	North Carolina Tar Heels	Vanderbilt University, Nashville, TN
2014	Texas Tech Red Raiders	#1 Ranked at Year End & Collegiate 10’s Tournament Winners in College Station, TX		
2015	Texas Tech Red Raiders	#1 Ranked at Year End & Nationals Collegiate Game Winners in Austin, TX		

== See also ==
- US Footy
