= 2017 USAFL National Championships =

2017 USAFL National Championships San Diego, California
- League: United States Australian Football League
- Sport: Australian rules football
- Duration: 20–22 October 2017
- Men champions: Golden Gate Roos (1st premiership)
- Women champions: San Francisco Iron Maidens (2nd premiership)

USAFL National Championships seasons
- ← 2016 2018 →

The 2017 USAFL National Championships were the 21st installment of the premier United States annual Australian rules football club tournament. The tournament as held at the Surf Cup Sports Park in San Diego, California on October 20–22.

== 2017 USAFL National Championships club rankings ==
=== Men ===
Rank	Team	Change	State
1	Golden Gate Roos	▲1	California
2	Los Angeles Dragons	▲3	California
3	Austin Crows	▼2	Texas
4	Dallas Magpies	▲4	Texas
5	Denver Bulldogs	▼1	Colorado
6	New York Magpies	▼3	New York
7	Baltimore–Washington Eagles	▲7	Maryland
8	Calgary Kangaroos	▲1	Alberta (Canada)
9	Quebec Saints	▼2	Quebec (Canada)
10	Orange County Giants	N/A	California
11	Portland Steelheads	▲6	Oregon
12	Minnesota Freeze	▲3	Minnesota
13	Sacramento Suns	▲3	California
14	Houston Lonestars	▼3	Texas
15	Chicago Swans	▼3	Illinois
16	Boston Demons	▼3	Massachusetts
17	Seattle Grizzlies	▲2	Washington
18	San Diego Lions	▲2	California
19	Arizona Hawks	N/A	Arizona
20	Columbus Cats	▼10	Ohio
21	Philadelphia Hawks	–	Pennsylvania
22	Nashville Kangaroos	▲3	Tennessee
23	Baton Rouge Tigers	N/A	Louisiana
24	North Carolina Tigers	▼6	North Carolina
25	Tulsa Buffaloes	▲3	Oklahoma
26	Cincinnati Dockers	▼3	Ohio
27	Des Moines Roosters	–	Iowa
28	Fort Lauderdale Fighting Squids	▼6	Florida

=== Women ===
Rank	Team	Change	State
1	San Francisco Iron Maidens	–	California
2	Denver Bulldogs	–	Colorado
3	Calgary Kookaburras	N/A	Alberta (Canada)
4	Minnesota Freeze	▼1	Minnesota
5	New York Magpies	–	New York
6	Seattle Grizzlies	N/A	Washington
7	Montreal Angels	–	Quebec (Canada)
8	Sacramento Suns	▼4	California
9	Portland Sockeyes	▼3	Oregon
10	Los Angeles Dragons	N/A	California
11	Houston Lonestars	N/A	Texas
12	Baltimore Washington Eagles	N/A	Maryland
13	Columbus Cats	N/A	Ohio
