= 2013 USAFL National Championships =

- League: United States Australian Football League
- Sport: Australian rules football
- Duration: 19–20 October 2013
- Games: 67
- Teams: 39 (32 Men's, 7 Women's)
- champions: (Texas) Austin Crows (men's) (Colorado) Denver Bulldogs (women)

USAFL National Championships seasons
- ← 2012 2014 →

The 2013 USAFL National Championships was the 17th installment of the premier United States annual Australian rules football club tournament. The tournament was held in Austin, Texas from 19 to 20 October. The National Champions from the men's competition were the Austin Crows and from the women's competition the champions were the Denver Bulldogs.

== Men's Division One tournament ==
Pool A	Pool B
(Texas) Austin Crows; (California) Golden Gate Roos; (New York (state)) New York Magpies; (Washington (state)) Seattle Grizzlies	(Alberta) Calgary Kangaroos; (Colorado) Denver Bulldogs; (Tennessee) Nashville Kangaroos; (California) Orange County Bombers

=== Minor rounds ===
	Round Robin
Saturday, 19 October (9:00am)	(Alberta) Calgary Kangaroos 5.7 (37)	def.	(Tennessee) Nashville Kangaroos 1.0 (6)	Onion Creek, Austin, Texas	Report
Saturday, 19 October (1:30pm)	(New York (state)) New York Magpies 8.6 (54)	def.	(California) Golden Gate Roos 1.0 (6)	Onion Creek, Austin, Texas	Report
Saturday, 19 October (3:30pm)	(Colorado) Denver Bulldogs 5.9 (39)	def.	(California) Orange County Bombers 1.0 (6)	Onion Creek, Austin, Texas	Report
Saturday, 19 October (9:30am)	(Texas) Austin Crows 8.3 (51)	def.	(Washington (state)) Seattle Grizzlies 0.1 (1)	Onion Creek, Austin, Texas	Report
Saturday, 19 October (Time)	(Colorado) Denver Bulldogs 5.7 (37)	def.	(Tennessee) Nashville Kangaroos 1.2 (8)	Onion Creek, Austin, Texas	Report
Saturday, 19 October (Time)	(Alberta) Calgary Kangaroos 11.11 (77)	def.	(California) Orange County Bombers 2.2 (14)	Onion Creek, Austin, Texas	Report
Saturday, 19 October (Time)	(Texas) Austin Crows 8.7 (55)	def.	(California) Golden Gate Roos 1.1 (7)	Onion Creek, Austin, Texas	Report
Saturday, 19 October (Time)	(New York (state)) New York Magpies 7.6 (48)	def.	(Washington (state)) Seattle Grizzlies 1.1 (7)	Onion Creek, Austin, Texas	Report
Sunday, 20 October (Time)	(Alberta) Calgary Kangaroos 4.8 (32)	def.	(Colorado) Denver Bulldogs 0.2 (2)	Onion Creek, Austin, Texas	Report
Sunday, 20 October (Time)	(New York (state)) New York Magpies 1.4 (10)	def. by	(Texas) Austin Crows 6.1 (37)	Onion Creek, Austin, Texas	Report
Sunday, 20 October (Time)	(California) Orange County Bombers 4.4 (28)	def. by	(Tennessee) Nashville Kangaroos 5.4 (34)	Onion Creek, Austin, Texas	Report
Sunday, 20 October (Time)	(Washington (state)) Seattle Grizzlies 4.2 (26)	def. by	(California) Golden Gate Roos 4.3 (27)	Onion Creek, Austin, Texas	Report

=== Final Division Ladders ===
Division 1

#	TEAM	P	W	L	D	PF	PA	%	PTS	Fin
1	(Texas) Austin Crows (P)	3	3	0	0	143	18	794	12	Grand; Final
2	(Alberta) Calgary Kangaroos	3	3	0	0	146	22	663	12	Grand; Final
3	(New York (state)) New York Magpies	3	2	1	0	112	50	224	8	Final; Ladder; Position
4	(Colorado) Denver Bulldogs	3	2	1	0	78	46	169	8	Final; Ladder; Position
5	(Tennessee) Nashville Kangaroos	3	1	2	0	48	102	47	4	Final; Ladder; Position
6	(California) Orange County	3	1	2	0	48	150	32	0	Final; Ladder; Position
7	(California) Golden Gate Roos	3	0	3	0	40	135	29	4	Final; Ladder; Position
8	(Washington (state)) Seattle Grizzlies	3	0	3	0	34	126	26	0	Final; Ladder; Position

=== Grand final ===
Grand final
Sunday, 20 October (4:00pm)	(Texas) Austin Crows	def.	(Alberta) Calgary Kangaroos	Onion Creek, Austin, Texas	Report
3.0 (18) 4.2 (26)	Q1; Q2; Q3; Final	2.0 (12) 4.1 (25)

== Men's Division Two tournament ==
	Team	Played	Won	Lost	Tied	Goals	PF	PA	%	Points	Fin
1	Columbus Jackaroos (P)	3	3	0	0	23	148	45	328	12	
2	Los Angeles Dragons	3	3	0	0	19	134	25	536	12	
3	Minnesota Freeze	3	2	1	0	12	92	56	164	8	
4	Fort Lauderdale Fighting Squids	3	2	1	0	8	56	65	86	8	
5	Chicago Swans	3	1	2	0	6	44	61	72	4	
6	Baltimore Washington Eagles	3	1	2	0	7	52	119	43	4	
7	New York Magpies B	3	0	3	0	8	54	126	42	0	
8	Boston Demons	3	0	3	0	2	19	102	18	0	

== Men's Division Three tournament ==
	Team	Played	Won	Lost	Tied	Goals	PF	PA	%	Points	Fin
1	Sacramento Suns	3	3	0	0	18	122	39	312	12	
2	Houston Lonestars (P)	3	2	1	0	13	92	53	173	8	
3	Philadelphia Hawks	3	2	1	0	17	123	58	212	8	
4	Portland Steelheads	3	2	1	0	13	88	60	146	8	
5	Des Moines Roosters	3	1	2	0	12	87	88	98	4	
6	San Diego Lions	3	2	1	0	9	63	70	90	8	
7	Kansas City Power	3	0	3	0	8	59	119	49	0	
8	Austin Crows B	3	0	3	0	2	13	160	8	0	

== Men's Division Four tournament ==
	Team	Played	Won	Lost	Tied	Goals	PF	PA	%	Points	Fin
1	North Carolina Tigers	3	3	0	0	22	156	30	520	12	
2	Cincinnati Dockers (P)	3	3	0	0	22	153	56	273	12	
3	Denver Bulldogs B	3	2	1	0	25	164	86	190	8	
4	Golden Gate Roos B	3	2	1	0	15	104	84	123	8	
5	Atlanta Kookaburras	3	1	2	0	7	54	84	64	4	
6	Tulsa Buffaloes	3	1	2	0	9	66	130	50	4	
7	Baltimore Washington Eagles	3	0	3	0	9	63	150	42	0	
8	Minnesota Freeze B	3	0	3	0	5	36	176	20	0	

== Men's National Club Rankings ==
Rank	State	Team
1	Texas	Austin Crows
2	Alberta	Calgary Kangaroos
3	(New York (state)) New York State	New York Magpies
4	Colorado	Denver Bulldogs
5	Tennessee	Nashville Kangaroos
6	California	Orange County Bombers
7	California	Golden Gate Roos
8	(Washington (state)) Washington	Seattle Grizzlies
9	Ohio	Columbus Jackaroos
10	California	Los Angeles Dragons
11	Minnesota	Minnesota Freeze
12	Florida	Fort Lauderdale Fighting Squids
13	Illinois	Chicago Swans
14	Maryland	Baltimore Washington Eagles
15	Massachusetts	Boston Demons
16	Texas	Houston Lonestars
17	California	Sacramento Suns
18	(Pennsylvania) Pennsyville	Philadelphia Hawks
19	Oregon	Portland Steelheads
20	Iowa	Des Moines Roosters
21	California	San Diego Lions
22	Missouri	Kansas City Power
23	Ohio	Cincinnati Dockers
24	North Carolina	North Carolina Tigers
25	(Georgia (country)) Georgia	Atlanta Kookaburras
26	Oklahoma	Tulsa Buffaloes
