= 2014 USAFL National Championships =

2014 USAFL National Championships Dublin, Ohio
- League: United States Australian Football League
- Sport: Australian rules football
- Teams: 26
- champions: (New York (state)) New York Magpies (men's) (Colorado) Denver Bulldogs (women)

USAFL National Championships seasons
- ← 2013 2015 →

The 2014 USAFL National Championships was the 18th installment of the premier United States annual Australian rules football club tournament. The tournament was held in Dublin, Ohio from the 11–12 October. The National Champions from the men's competition were the New York Magpies and from the women's competition the champions were the Denver Bulldogs.

== Grand final ==
2014 USAFL Div 1 Grand Final
Sunday 12 October (4:00 pm)	Orange County	def. by	New York	Daree Fields, Dublin, Ohio	[Report]
2.0 (12) 2.1 (13)	Q1; Q2; Q3; Final	1.2 (8) 2.4 (16)	Umpires: Ross McLaren, Steve Arnott; Geoff Cann Medal: Marcus Jankie

== Men's National Club Rankings ==
Rank	State	Team	Change
1	(New York (state)) New York State	New York Magpies	▲2
2	California	Orange County Bombers	▲4
3	Alberta	Calgary Kangaroos	▼1
4	Colorado	Denver Bulldogs	—
5	Texas	Austin Crows	▼4
6	Minnesota	Minnesota Freeze	▲5
7	California	Golden Gate Roos	—
8	Texas	Dallas Magpies	N/A
9	California	Los Angeles Dragons	▲1
10	Ohio	Columbus Jackaroos	▼1
11	Texas	Houston Lonestars	▲5
12	Quebec	Quebec Saints	N/A
13	Maryland	Baltimore Washington Eagles	▲1
14	Illinois	Chicago Swans	▼1
15	Tennessee	Nashville Kangaroos	▼10
16	Massachusetts	Boston Demons	▼1
17	California	Sacramento Suns	—
18	Pennsylvania	Philadelphia Hawks	—
19	Ohio	Cincinnati Dockers	▲4
20	Iowa	Des Moines Roosters	—
21	Oregon	Portland Steelheads	▼2
22	Florida	Fort Lauderdale Fighting Squids	▼10
23	North Carolina	North Carolina Tigers	▲1
24	Oklahoma	Tulsa Buffaloes	▲2
25	(Georgia (country)) Georgia	Atlanta Kookaburras	—
26	Wisconsin	Milwaukee Bombers	N/A
