= 2015 USAFL National Championships =

2015 USAFL National Championships Austin, Texas
- League: United States Australian Football League
- Sport: Australian rules football
- Duration: 17–18 October 2015
- Teams: 34 men's 15 women's
- Men champions: Austin Crows (2nd premiership)
- Women champions: Denver Bulldogs (6th premiership)

USAFL National Championships seasons
- ← 2014 2016 →

The 2015 USAFL National Championships was the 19th instalment of the premier United States annual Australian rules football club tournament. The tournament was held in Austin, Texas, for the third time, from 17 October to 18 October. It was the first edition of the tournament with two women's divisions. The Austin Crows won the Division 1 Men's Title defeating the Orange County Bombers. The Denver Bulldogs won the Division 1 Women's Title finishing first in a four-game round robin.

== Clubs ==
=== Men's ===
Men's Premier	Men's Division 2	Men's Division 3	Men's Division 4
Austin Crows (A)	Columbus Jackaroos (A)	Tulsa Buffaloes (A)	New York res/Columbus res
Los Angeles Dragons (A)	Boston Demons (A)	Philadelphia Hawks (A)	Los Angeles reserves
Calgary Kangaroos (A)	Sacramento Suns (A)	North Carolina Tigers (A)	Kansas City/Cleveland
Golden Gate Roos (A)	Ft. Lauderdale Fighting Squids (A)	Ohio Valley River Rats (A)	Calgary res/Milwaukee
New York Magpies (B)	Minnesota Freeze (B)	Portland Steelheads (B)	Baltimore-Washington/Edmonton
Orange County Bombers (B)	Houston Lonestars (B)	Des Moines Roosters (B)	Golden Gate reserves
Denver Bulldogs (B)	Chicago Swans (B)	Nashville Kangaroos (B)	Orange County res/San Diego
Dallas Magpies (B)	Quebec Saints (B)	Austin Crows reserves (B)	Dallas res/Austin res
			Atlanta Kookaburras
Portland res/Seattle
Denver res/Indianapolis
Houston res/Baton Rouge

=== Women's ===
Women's Premier	Women's Division 2
Denver Lady Bulldogs	Calgary/Portland/Vancouver
San Francisco Iron Maidens	Boston/Columbus/Chicago/Tulsa
Minnesota Freeze	Arizona/Baltimore-Washington
New York Lady Magpies	Minnesota/Montreal
Sacramento Lady Suns	

== Men's Division 1 ==
=== Round 1 (Men's Division 1) ===
	Round 1 (A)
Sat, 17 Oct (11:00 am)	Austin Crows 4.5 (29)	def.	Golden Gate Roos 3.1 (20)	Cooper's	Report
Sat, 17 Oct (12:00 pm)	Los Angeles Dragons 3.4 (22)	def. by	Calgary Kangaroos 4.5 (29)	Cooper's	Report

	Round 1 (B)
Sat, 17 Oct (9:00 am)	New York Magpies 9.3 (57)	def.	Dallas Magpies 1.3 (9)	Cooper's	Report
Sat, 17 Oct (10:00 am)	Orange County Bombers 3.5 (23)	def.	Denver Bulldogs 3.2 (20)	Cooper's	Report

=== Round 2 (Men's Division 1) ===
	Round 2 (A)
Sat, 17 Oct (4:00 pm)	Los Angeles Dragons 2.3 (15)	def. by	Golden Gate Roos 3.7 (25)	Cooper's	Report
Sat, 17 Oct (5:00 pm)	Austin Crows 7.4 (46)	def.	Calgary Kangaroos 2.3 (15)	Cooper's	Report

	Round 2 (B)
Sat, 17 Oct (2:00 pm)	Orange County Bombers 6.7 (43)	def.	Dallas Magpies 1.2 (8)	Cooper's	Report
Sat, 17 Oct (3:00 pm)	New York Magpies 3.2 (20)	def. by	Denver Bulldogs 5.4 (34)	Cooper's	Report

=== Round 3 (Men's Division 1) ===
	Round 3 (A)
Sun, 18 Oct (9:00 am)	Calgary Kangaroos 3.3 (21)	def. by	Golden Gate Roos 3.4 (22)	Cooper's	Report
Sun, 18 Oct (12:00 pm)	Austin Crows 6.6 (42)	def.	Los Angeles Dragons 0.4 (4)	Cooper's	Report

	Round 3 (B)
Sun, 18 Oct (10:00 am)	Denver Bulldogs 6.2 (38)	def.	Dallas Magpies 2.2 (14)	Cooper's	Report
Sun, 18 Oct (11:00 am)	New York Magpies 3.4 (22)	def. by	Orange County Bombers 4.12 (36)	Cooper's	Report

=== Group Stage Ladders (Men's Division 1) ===
Group A

#	TEAM	P	W	L	D	PF	PA	%	PTS
1	Austin Crows	2	2	0	0	75	35	214	8
2	Golden Gate Roos	2	1	1	0	45	44	102	4
3	Calgary Kangaroos	2	1	1	0	44	68	64	4
4	Los Angeles Dragons	2	0	2	0	37	54	68	0

Group B

#	TEAM	P	W	L	D	PF	PA	%	PTS
1	Orange County Bombers	2	2	0	0	66	28	235	8
2	New York Magpies	2	1	1	0	77	43	179	4
3	Denver Bulldogs	2	1	1	0	54	43	125	4
4	Dallas Magpies	2	0	2	0	17	100	17	0

=== Grand Final (Men's Division 1) ===
	USAFL Grand Final (Men's Division 1)
GF: Sun, 18 Oct (4:30 pm)	Austin Crows 4.4 (28)	def.	Orange County Bombers 2.4 (16)	Cooper's (crowd: 1,000)	Report

== Women's Division 1 ==
=== Round 1 (Women's Division 1) ===
	Saturday Rounds
Sat, 17 Oct (9:00 am)	San Francisco 1.4 (10)	def. by	New York Magpies 2.2 (14)	Women's	Report
Sat, 17 Oct (10:00 am)	Minnesota Freeze 1.4 (10)	def.	Sacramento Suns 1.1 (7)	Women's	Report
Sat, 17 Oct (1:00 pm)	Denver Bulldogs 4.9 (33)	def.	New York Magpies 1.1 (7)	Women's	Report
Sat, 17 Oct (2:00 pm)	San Francisco 3.2 (20)	def.	Minnesota Freeze 2.0 (12)	Women's	Report
Sat, 17 Oct (4:00 pm)	Denver Bulldogs 2.3 (15)	def.	Sacramento Suns 1.1 (7)	Women's	Report

	Sunday Rounds
Sun, 18 Oct (9:00 am)	New York Magpies 2.3 (15)	def.	Sacramento Suns 0.3 (3)	Women's	Report
Sun, 18 Oct (11:00 am)	Denver Bulldogs 2.2 (14)	def. by	Minnesota Freeze 3.2 (20)	Women's	Report
Sun, 18 Oct (12:00 pm)	San Francisco 1.4 (10)	def.	Sacramento Suns 1.2 (8)	Women's	Report
Sun, 18 Oct (2:00 pm)	Minnesota Freeze 4.4 (28)	def. by	New York Magpies 6.6 (42)	Women's	Report
Sun, 18 Oct (3:00 pm)	Denver Bulldogs 2.6 (18)	def.	San Francisco 0.2 (2)	Women's	Report
Minnesota ended the Denver Lady Bulldogs 23 game winning streak in USAFL Nationals.

=== Ladder (Women's Division 1) ===
	TEAM	P	W	L	D	PF	PA	%	PTS
1.	Denver Bulldogs (P)	4	3	1	0	80	36	222	12
2.	New York Magpies	4	3	1	0	78	74	105	12
3.	Minnesota Freeze	4	2	2	0	70	83	84	8
4.	San Francisco	4	2	2	0	42	52	81	8
5.	Sacramento Suns	4	0	0	0	25	50	50	0

== 2015 USAFL National Championships club rankings ==
=== Men ===
Rank	Team	Change	State
1	Austin Crows	▲4	Texas
2	Orange County Bombers	—	California
3	Denver Bulldogs	▲1	Colorado
4	Golden Gate Roos	▲3	California
5	New York Magpies	▼4	New York
6	Calgary Kangaroos	▼3	Alberta
7	Los Angeles Dragons	▲2	California
8	Dallas Magpies	—	Texas
9	Quebec Saints	▲3	Quebec
10	Sacramento Suns	▲7	California
11	Columbus Jackaroos	▼1	Ohio
12	Houston Lonestars	—	Texas
13	Chicago Swans	▲1	Illinois
14	Boston Demons	▲2	Massachusetts
15	Minnesota Freeze	▼9	Minnesota
16	Fort Lauderdale Fighting Squids	▲6	Florida
17	Portland Steelheads	▲5	Oregon
18	Cincinnati Dockers	▲1	Ohio
19	Philadelphia Hawks	▼1	Pennsylvania
20	North Carolina Tigers	▲3	North Carolina
21	Des Moines Roosters	▼1	Iowa
22	Nashville Kangaroos	▼7	Tennessee
23	Tulsa Buffaloes	▲1	Oklahoma
24	San Diego Lions	N/A	California
25	Kansas City Power	N/A	Kansas

=== Women ===
Rank	Team	Change	State
1	Denver Bulldogs	—	Colorado
2	New York Magpies	▲4	New York
3	Minnesota Freeze	—	Minnesota
4	San Francisco	▼2	California
5	Sacramento Suns	▲2	California
6	Calgary Kookaburras	▼3	Alberta
7	Boston Demons	N/A	Massachusetts
8	Arizona Hawks	N/A	Arizona
