= 2016 USAFL National Championships =

2016 USAFL National Championships Sarasota, Florida
- League: United States Australian Football League
- Sport: Australian rules football
- Duration: 15–17 October 2016
- Men champions: Austin Crows (3rd premiership)
- Women champions: San Francisco Iron Maidens (1st premiership)

USAFL National Championships seasons
- ← 2015 2017 →

The 2016 USAFL National Championships were the 20th installment of the premier United States annual Australian rules football club tournament. The tournament as held at the Premier Sports Campus in Lakewood Ranch, Florida, on October 15–16. The tournament saw a total of 41 teams representing 34 USAFL clubs and three from AFL Canada.

== Recap ==
The Austin Crows picked up their second consecutive Men's Division 1 premiership by sweeping the group stage and then defeating the Golden Gate Roos 39-13 in the Grand Final. The Roos' appearance in the Final was their first at the D1 level since 1999. Nolan Cox, brother of Collingwood Football Club player Mason Cox, was named most consistent for the tournament in helping the Crows to their third D1 flag in three years. Austin's 4-0 record completed a perfect 18-0 season, and extended their win streak to 23 games, the second longest in Men's USAFL history. Elsewhere, the Calgary Kangaroos won their second ever Division 2 title, the Portland Steelheads became the first D3 team to win back to back titles, and the Ohio Valley River Rats won their fifth Division 4 premiership.

In Women's Division 1, the Denver Lady Bulldogs saw their six-year streak of National Championships snapped, falling to the San Francisco Iron Maidens. The Maidens, who are the women's arm of the Golden Gate Australian Football League, beat Denver 9-6 in their first game on Sunday afternoon, then defeated the Minnesota Freeze 16-6 to finish the round robin competition at 4-0 to clinch the title. The Division 2 Women's competition, made up of three combined teams, was won by the team with players from the Portland Sockeyes, Seattle Grizzlies, Arizona Hawks, and Tampa Bay ARFC.

Special guests on the weekend were Hawthorn Football Club greats Dermott Brereton and Chris Wittman, who held a coaches clinic on the Friday before the tournament, and also provided broadcast commentary. A record 30 matches were broadcast live via the USAFL's YouTube channel, including all twelve Men's Division 1 group matches, all fifteen Women's Division matches, and the Men's Division 1, 2, and 3 Grand Finals.

== Men's Division 1 ==
=== Round 1 ===
	Round 1 (Pool A)
Sat, 15 Oct (9:00am)	Austin Crows 4.4 (28)	def.	Quebec Saints 1.3 (9)
Sat, 15 Oct (11:00am)	Los Angeles Dragons 4.2 (26)	def. by	Denver Bulldogs 8.2 (50)

	Round 1 (Pool B)
Sat, 15 Oct (10:00am)	New York Magpies 7.9 (51)	def.	Dallas Magpies 0.1 (1)
Sat, 15 Oct (12:00pm)	Golden Gate Roos 10.12 (72)	def.	Orange County Bombers 0.0 (0)

=== Round 2 ===
	Round 2 (Pool A)
Sat, 15 Oct (2:00pm)	Los Angeles Dragons 4.9 (33)	def.	Quebec Saints 2.2 (14)
Sat, 15 Oct (3:00pm)	Austin Crows 5.10 (40)	def.	Denver Bulldogs 1.0 (6)

	Round 2 (Pool B)
Sat, 15 Oct (4:00pm)	New York Magpies 9.7 (61)	def.	Orange County Bombers 0.2 (2)
Sat, 15 Oct (5:00pm)	Golden Gate Roos 8.11 (59)	def.	Dallas Magpies 0.0 (0)

=== Round 3 ===
	Round 3 (Pool A)
Sun, 16 Oct (11:00am)	Austin Crows 7.5 (47)	def.	Los Angeles Dragons 0.5 (5)
Sun, 16 Oct (12:00pm)	Denver Bulldogs 3.1 (19)	def. by	Quebec Saints 3.4 (22)

	Round 3 (Pool B)
Sun, 16 Oct (9:00am)	Orange County Bombers 8.5 (53)	def.	Dallas Magpies 4.2 (26)
Sun, 16 Oct (10:00am)	New York Magpies 1.3 (9)	def. by	Golden Gate Roos 3.6 (24)

=== Group Stage Ladders (Men's Division 1) ===
Group A

#	TEAM	P	W	L	D	PF	PA	%	PTS
1	Austin Crows	3	3	0	0	115	20	575	12
2	Denver Bulldogs	3	1	2	0	75	88	85	4
3	Los Angeles Dragons	3	1	2	0	64	111	57	4
4	Quebec Saints	3	1	2	0	45	80	56	4

Group B

#	TEAM	P	W	L	D	PF	PA	%	PTS
1	Golden Gate Roos	3	3	0	0	155	9	1722	12
2	New York Magpies	3	2	1	0	121	27	448	8
3	Orange County Bombers	3	1	2	0	55	159	34	4
4	Dallas Magpies	3	0	3	0	27	163	16	0

=== Division 1 Men's Grand Final ===
USAFL Grand Final (Division 1 Men's)
Sunday, 15 Oct (4:00pm)	Austin Crows	def.	Golden Gate Roos	Premier Sports Campus Lakewood Ranch, FL (crowd: 1,200)
6.2 (38) 6.3 (39)	Q1; Q2; Q3; Final	0.1 (1) 2.1 (13)

== 2016 USAFL National Championships club rankings ==
=== Men ===
Rank	Team	Change	State
1	Austin Crows	—	Texas
2	Golden Gate Roos	▲2	California
3	New York Magpies	▲2	New York
4	Denver Bulldogs	▼1	Colorado
5	Los Angeles Dragons	▲2	California
6	Orange County Bombers	▼4	California
7	Quebec Saints	▲2	Quebec (Canada)
8	Dallas Magpies	—	Texas
9	Calgary Kangaroos	▼3	Alberta (Canada)
10	Columbus Jackaroos	▲1	Ohio
11	Houston Lonestars	▲1	Texas
12	Chicago Swans	▲1	Illinois
13	Boston Demons	▲1	Massachusetts
14	Baltimore-Washington Eagles	N/A	Maryland
15	Minnesota Freeze	—	Minnesota
16	Sacramento Suns	▼6	California
17	Portland Steelheads	—	Oregon
18	North Carolina Tigers	▲2	North Carolina
19	Seattle Grizzlies	N/A	Washington
20	San Diego Lions	▲4	California
21	Philadelphia Hawks	▼2	Pennsylvania
22	Fort Lauderdale Fighting Squids	▼6	Florida
23	Cincinnati Dockers	▼5	Ohio
24	St Petersburg Starfish	N/A	Florida
25	Nashville Kangaroos	▼3	Tennessee
26	Atlanta Kookaburras	N/A	Georgia
27	Des Moines Roosters	▼6	Iowa
28	Tulsa Buffaloes	▼5	Oklahoma

=== Women ===
Rank	Team	Change	State
1	San Francisco	▲4	California
2	Denver Bulldogs	▼1	Colorado
3	Minnesota Freeze	—	Minnesota
4	Sacramento Suns	▲1	California
5	New York Magpies	▼3	New York
6	Portland Sockeyes	N/A	Oregon
7	Montreal Angels	N/A	Quebec (Canada)
8	Columbus Jillaroos	N/A	Ohio
