= 2019 USAFL National Championships =

2019 USAFL National Championships Bradenton-Sarasota, Florida
- League: United States Australian Football League
- Sport: Australian rules football
- Duration: 12–13 October 2019
- Men champions: Austin Crows (4th premiership)
- Women champions: San Francisco Iron Maidens (4th premiership)

USAFL National Championships seasons
- ← 2018 2020 →

The 2019 USAFL National Championships were the 23rd instalment of the premier United States annual Australian rules football club tournament.

== 2019 USAFL National Championships club rankings ==
=== Men ===
Rank	Team	Change	State
1	Austin Crows	–	Texas
2	Denver Bulldogs	▲4	Colorado
3	Golden Gate Roos	▼1	California
4	Quebec Saints	▲1	Quebec (Canada)
5	Los Angeles Dragons	▼2	California
6	Minnesota Freeze	▲3	Minnesota
7	Seattle Grizzlies		Washington
8	New York Magpies	▼4	New York
9	San Diego Lions	▲3	California
10	Baltimore Dockers	–	Maryland
11	Portland Steelheads		Oregon
12	Philadelphia Hawks		Pennsylvania
13	Orange County Giants		California
14	Houston Lonestars		Texas
15	Nashville Kangaroos		Tennessee
16	Dallas Dingoes		Texas
17	Boston Demons		Massachusetts
18	Columbus Cats		Ohio
19	Sacramento Suns		California
20	Oklahoma FC		Oklahoma
21	Arizona Outlaws		Arizona
22	Chicago Swans		Illinois
23	Ohio Valley River Rats		Ohio
24	Des Moines Roosters		Iowa
25	DC Eagles		Washington, D.C.
26	North Carolina Tigers		North Carolina
27	Atlanta Kookaburras		Georgia
28	Fort Lauderdale Fighting Squids		Florida

=== Women ===
Rank	Team	Change	State
1	San Francisco Iron Maidens		California
2	Seattle Grizzlies		Washington
3	New York Magpies		New York
4	Minnesota Freeze		Minnesota
5	Portland Sockeyes		Oregon
6	Denver Lady Bulldogs		Colorado
7	Philadelphia Lady Hawks		Pennsylvania
8	DC Eagles Women		Washington DC
9	Sacramento Lady Suns		California
10	Montreal Angels		Quebec (Canada)
11	Columbus Cats		Ohio
12	Houston Lonestars		Texas
