= United States men's national Australian rules football team =

United States
- Nickname(s): Revolution
- Head coach: Stefan Barr

Rankings
- Current: 6th (as of October 2022)

First international
- 1999 49th Parallel Cup; United States vs. Canada; 10.15 (75) def. 8.7 (55)

International Cup
- Appearances: 6 (first in 2002)
- Best result: 3rd (2005)

The United States national Australian rules football team, nicknamed the Revolution, represents the United States of America in the sport of Australian rules football. The Revolution are named after the American Revolution (an event which gave the country separation from the British Empire) and wear the colors of the American flag.

The team plays in international tournaments, including the Australian Football International Cup, as well as exhibition matches against other countries. The US national team has participated in every International Cup since its inception in 2002. The team's best result has been third behind New Zealand and Papua New Guinea at the 2005 Australian Football International Cup.

Revolution players are selected from United States-born players from USAFL clubs across the country.

== History ==
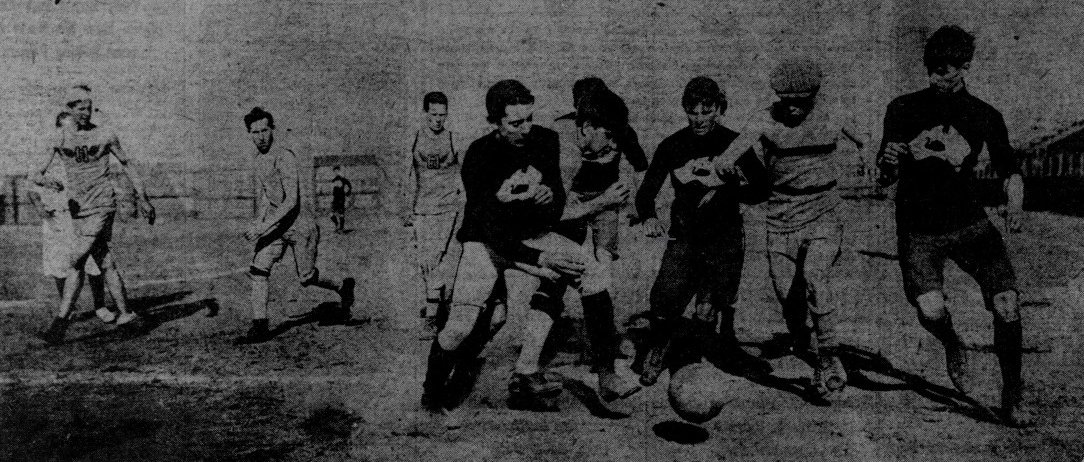
International fieldball: USA v Young Australia. Presidio of San Francisco. 1 October 1911

The first American representative team was assembled from grammar schools and took part in three reciprocal tours of Australia with international matches played at junior level between 1909 and 1919, the game in the US at the time was known as Fieldball and it competed against Australia in 1911 in front of a crowd of more than 5,000 in San Francisco. In addition to the matches against Australia, the team also competed against Canada in 1911 and 1915. It was disbanded in the 1920s and it would be another three quarters of a century before a team was again assembled to compete at international level.

Australian football legend Paul Roos coached the national side's inaugural game in 1999 at Chicago (Naperville, 8/1/99) to victory over Canada USA 10:15(75) CAN 8:12(60) before returning to Australia be appointed as coach of the Australian Football League side the Sydney Swans.

Gary Hill of the Milwaukee Bombers succeeded Roos, coaching the Revolution from 2000 to 2001.

Under 2006 head coach Tom Ellis, the Revolution lost in a lopsided score to the ex-patriate team (the All-comers) in a January 2006 match played as a curtain raiser to the AFL exhibition match held at UCLA.

On November 2, 2006, it was announced that Australian Trevor Lovitt would be the new Revolution head coach. Lovitt had served as an assistant coach (1998-2001) with the Noble Park Football Club (a premier division Eastern Football League club), winning the premiership twice, and twice finishing runner-up. In 2002 and 2003, Trevor served as the head coach of Mulgrave Football Club’s (division 2 Eastern Football League) senior team which finished 3rd in 2002 and 2nd in 2003. From 2003 to 2005, he was an assistant with Frankston Football Club in the Victorian Football League. He also served as a recruiting officer for Port Adelaide Football Club in 2004 and 2005.

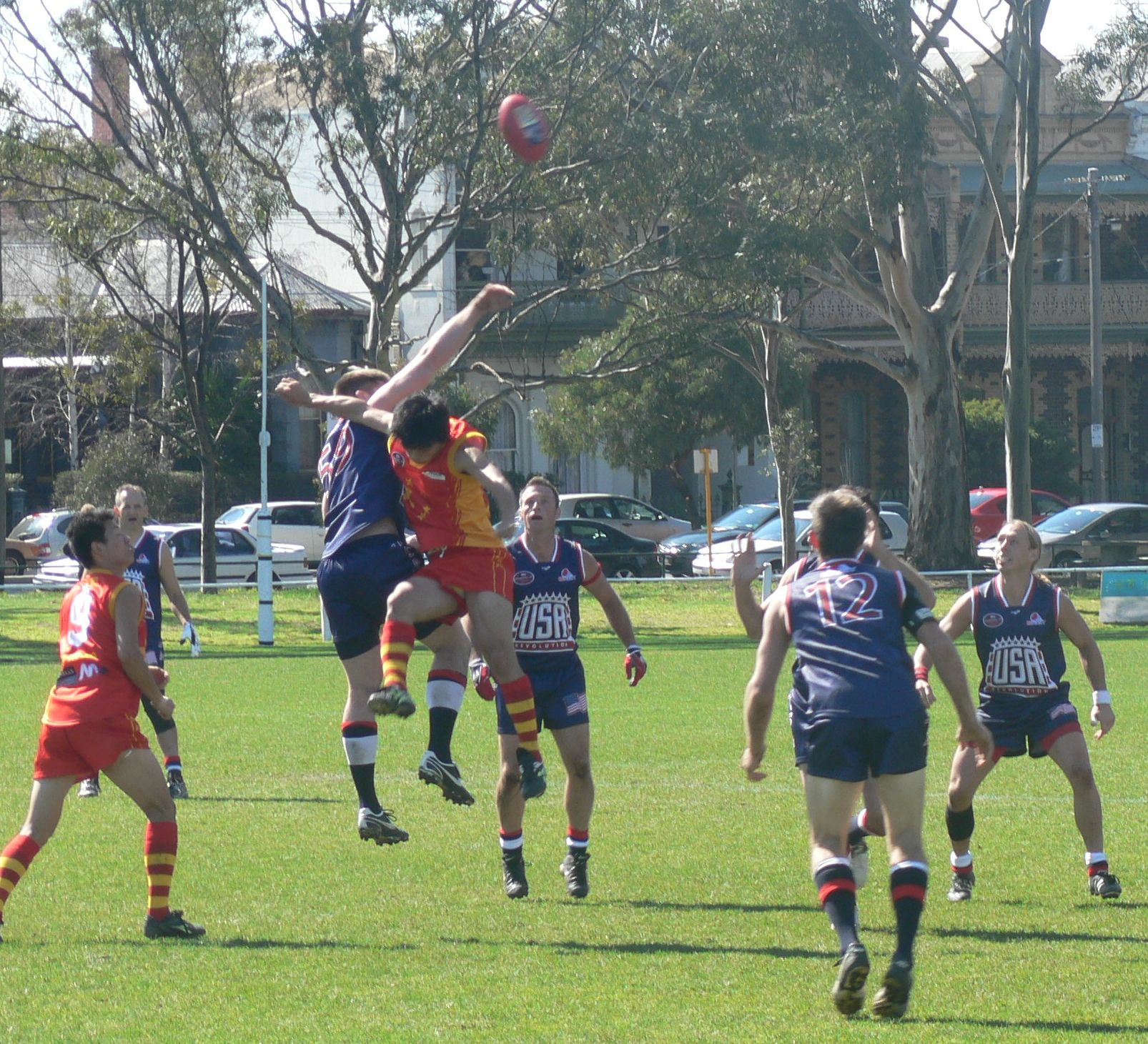
Action from USA Revolution vs China during the 2008 International Cup

Prior to the 2008 Australian Football International Cup, Trevor Lovitt stepped down as coach. New York Magpies coach Robert Oliver was appointed coach of the Revolution and guided the team to Melbourne. Matt Bishop became head coach in 2009. Tom Ellis returned as head coach in May 2015.

== International competition ==
=== International Cup ===
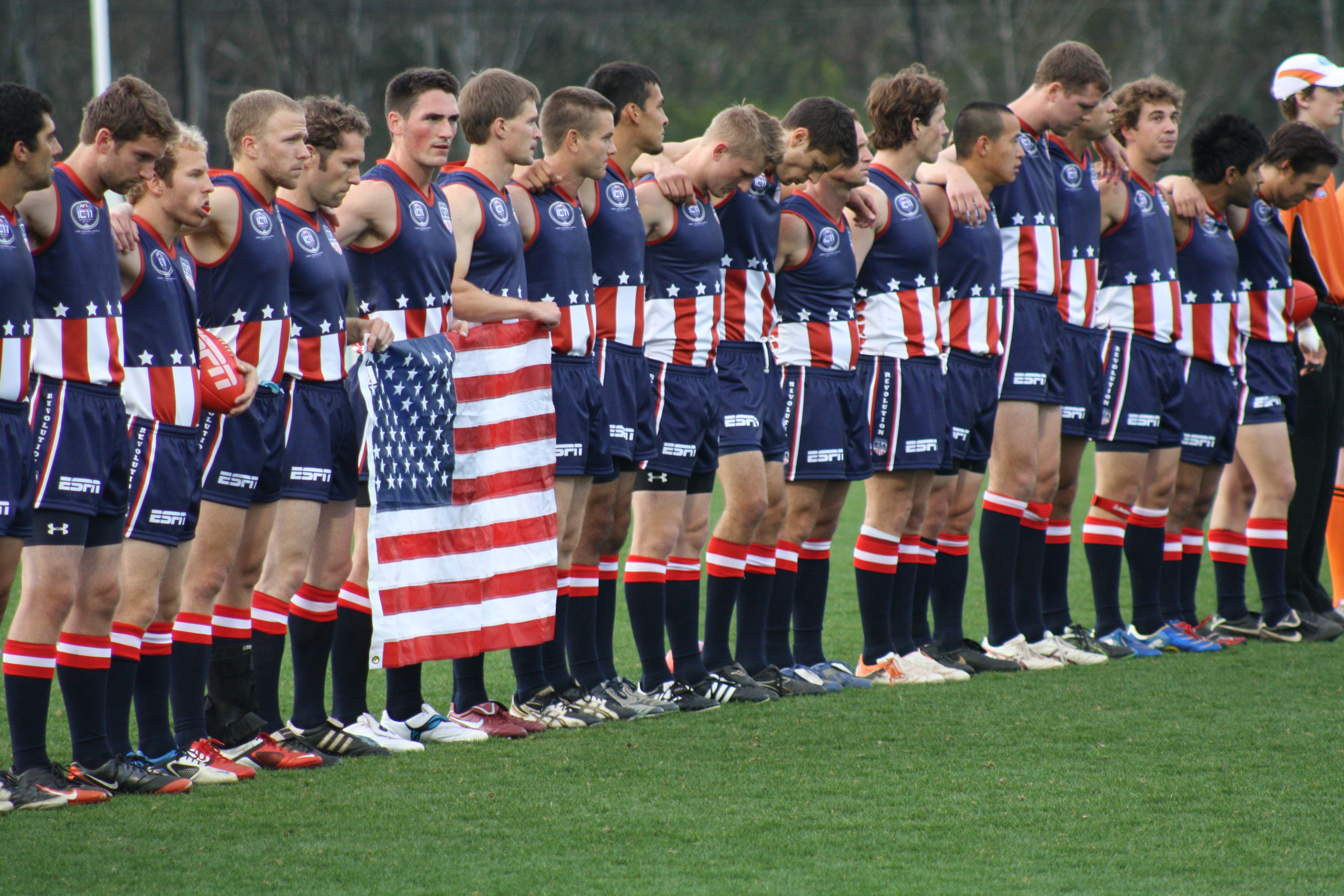
The U.S. National Team at the 2011 Australian Football International Cup

USA International Cup results
Year	Finish	P	W-L-D	PF	PA	%
2002	5/11	6	4-2-0	393	184	213.59
2005	3/10	6	4-2-0	277	200	138.50
2008	7/16	5	3-2-0	342	129	265.12
2011	4/18	6	4-2-0	326	170	191.76
2014	8/18	5	3-2-0	360	166	216.87
2017	4/18	5	3-2-0	312	201	155.22

=== 49th Parallel Cup ===
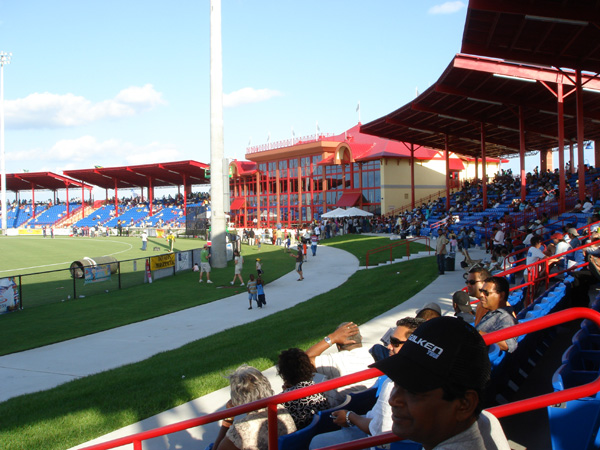
The 2015 49th Parallel Cup was played at CBRP Stadium in Florida

49th Parallel Cup
Year	Home team	Score	Away team	Score
1999	(United States) USA	10.15 (75)	Canada	8.7 (55)
2000	Canada	2.4 (16)	(United States) USA	4.17 (41)
2003	(United States) USA	9.12 (66)	Canada	9.10 (64)
2004	Canada	7.9 (51)	(United States) USA	9.9 (63)
2007	Canada	6.9 (45)	(United States) USA	4.8 (32)
2009	(United States) USA	12.11 (83)	Canada	5.3 (33)
2010	Canada	5.2 (32)	(United States) USA	9.12 (66)
2012	(United States) USA	7.12 (54)	Canada	5.1 (31)
2013	Canada	5.6 (36)	(United States) USA	10.7 (67)
2015	(United States) USA	6.9 (45)	Canada	3.11 (29)

== International Cup Squads ==
=== 2017 IC Squad ===
2017 IC Squad
#	Name	Date of Birth	Height	Weight	Club
1	Max DEPINA	17 April 1993	183 cm	75 kg	(United States) Seattle Grizzlies
2	Ryan McGETTIGAN	23 June 1984	180 cm	82 kg	(United States) Philadelphia Hawks
3	Caleb DOUGHERTY	27 September 1988	183 cm	76 kg	(United States) Kansas City Power
4	Ben CARPENTER-NWANYANWU	2 October 1991	183 cm	90 kg	(United States) Austin Crows
5	Daniel LIVY	20 February 1993	188 cm	90 kg	(United States) Golden Gate Roos
6	Ben JUDGE	19 July 1984	178 cm	82 kg	(United States) Des Moines Roosters
7	Dustin JONES	4 January 1979	173 cm	77 kg	(United States) Tampa Bay Starfish
8	Bobby SEARS	22 July 1985	190 cm	99 kg	(United States) Houston Lonestars
10	John FREEMAN	26 February 1987	175 cm	75 kg	(United States) Nashville Kangaroos
11	Brent FISCHER	21 April 1988	183 cm	77 kg	(United States) Minnesota Freeze
12	David FRANKO	13 August 1984	183 cm	78 kg	(United States) Golden Gate Roos
13	Saleh TYEBJEE	22 April 1985	190 cm	82 kg	(United States) Sacramento Suns
14	David RESTREPO	5 December 1989	178 cm	75 kg	(Australia) Melbourne University
15	Kyle JOHNSON, Captain	19 April 1987	185 cm	84 kg	(United States) Golden Gate Roos
16	Jeff KRAEMER	15 April 1990	193 cm	88 kg	(United States) Chicago Swans
17	Jay LEVESQUE	7 May 1981	178 cm	75 kg	(United States) Baltimore Washington Eagles
18	Bryan DRAGUS	6 October 1985	198 cm	102 kg	(United States) Golden Gate Roos
21	Will GLEASON	11 May 1996	175 cm	73 kg	(United States) Minnesota Freeze
22	Michael LINEHAN	4 April 1989	173 cm	72 kg	(United States) Austin Crows
23	Clyde SIMPSON	29 December 1986	180 cm	88 kg	(United States) Columbus Jackaroos
24	Jason WILHELM	30 March 1987	198 cm	100 kg	(United States) Arizona Hawks
27	Ryan GARTHRIGHT	5 December 1986	192 cm	91 kg	(United States) Denver Bulldogs
28	Erik HANSON	26 September 1978	183 cm	88 kg	(United States) North Carolina Tigers
32	Murphy MICHAEL	15 March 1983	178 cm	88 kg	(United States) New York Magpies
33	Tim LINDFELT	10 December 1980	196 cm	100 kg	(United States) Golden Gate Roos
34	Hamilton MAY	30 March 1989	180 cm	75 kg	(United States) Des Moines Roosters
42	Mark McCLURE	23 June 1987	203 cm	102 kg	(United States) Columbus Jackaroos
54	David GRZESIAK	28 July 1988	193 cm	92 kg	(United States) Dallas Magpies
55	Donald LEE	17 July 1986	198 cm	106 kg	(United States) Los Angeles Dragons
70	Buddy SPOHN	11 May 1988	193 cm	90 kg	(Australia) Black Rock Football Club

=== 2014 IC Squad ===
2014 IC Squad
#	Name	Date of Birth (Age)	Height	Weight	Club
1	Daniel DAHLQUIST	1 September 1994 (age 31)	188 cm	75 kg	(United States) Golden Gate Roos
2	Ryan McGETTIGAN	23 June 1984 (age 42)	180 cm	82 kg	(United States) Philadelphia Hawks
3	Kevin STANLEY	2 September 1982 (age 43)	183 cm	73 kg	(United States) Seattle Grizzlies
4	Andy VANICA	4 March 1978 (age 48)	173 cm	73 kg	(United States) Denver Bulldogs
5	Christian MERRITT	5 December 1984 (age 41)	180 cm	79 kg	(United States) Austin Crows
6	Brent FISCHER	21 April 1988 (age 38)	183 cm	77 kg	(United States) Minnesota Freeze
7	Robert SEARS	22 July 1985 (age 41)	191 cm	95 kg	(United States) Golden Gate Roos
8	Dan SARBACKER	16 June 1979 (age 47)	178 cm	72 kg	(United States) Chicago Swans
9	Jay LEVESQUE	7 May 1981 (age 45)	178 cm	79 kg	(United States) Baltimore DC Eagles
10	Mel CHEN	31 December 1981 (age 44)	175 cm	79 kg	(United States) Sacramento Suns
11	Daniel LEHANE	30 July 1993 (age 33)	188 cm	81 kg	(United States) New York Magpies
12	Brent MERGEN	14 May 1986 (age 40)	188 cm	86 kg	(United States) Minnesota Freeze
13	Saleh TYEBJEE	22 April 1985 (age 41)	188 cm	79 kg	(United States) Sacramento Suns
14	Jeffrey TALMADGE	15 November 1988 (age 37)	172 cm	70 kg	(United States) Austin Crows
15	Kyle JOHNSON	19 April 1987 (age 39)	185 cm	81 kg	(United States) Golden Gate Roos
16	Andrew WERNER	28 February 1986 (age 40)	188 cm	87 kg	(United States) Minnesota Freeze
17	Eric FLOYD	29 February 1988 (age 38)	183 cm	83 kg	(United States) Louisville Kings
18	Bryan DRAGUS	6 October 1985 (age 40)	198 cm	100 kg	(United States) Golden Gate Roos
19	Alex WALLACH	19 May 1989 (age 37)	183 cm	88 kg	(United States) Chicago Swans
20	Aaron CRUMPACKER	28 June 1984 (age 42)	178 cm	77 kg	(United States) Sacramento Suns
21	Luke NEMETH	14 November 1977 (age 48)	185 cm	87 kg	(United States) Nashville Kangaroos
22	Zach WEAVER	27 January 1986 (age 40)	188 cm	84 kg	(United States) Minnesota Freeze
23	Chet RIDENOUR	22 December 1981 (age 44)	196 cm	81 kg	(United States) Columbus Jackaroos
24	Ben CARPENTER-NWANYANWU	10 February 1991 (age 35)	183 cm	93 kg	(United States) Austin Crows
25	Jason WILHELM	30 March 1987 (age 39)	201 cm	100 kg	(United States) Chicago Swans
42	Mark McCLURE	24 June 1987 (age 39)	203 cm	100 kg	(United States) Columbus Jackaroos
44	Stephen FASHANT	12 July 1987 (age 39)	183 cm	85 kg	(United States) Minnesota Freeze
83	Ryan KASTL	29 December 1983 (age 42)	185 cm	84 kg	(United States) Seattle Grizzlies

=== 2011 IC Squad ===
2011 IC Squad
#	Name
1	Jacob MOYER
2	Ryan MCGETTIGAN
3	Brandon BLANKENSHIP
4	Andy VANICA
5	Paul DUNCAN
6	Adonias LUCERO
7	Jon LORING
8	Dan SARBACKER (Captain)
9	Jesse LEOS
10	Melvin CHEN
11	Chris CANDELARIA
12	Brent MERGEN
13	Saleh TYEBJEE
14	Patrick MILLER
15	Kyle JOHNSON
16	Andrew WERNER
17	Andrew PRICE
17	Eric FLOYD
18	Bryan DRAGUS
19	Ryan SUTHERLAND
20	Zach WEAVER
21	Luke NEMETH
22	Justin VALLEY
23	Noor JEHANGIR
25	Richard WHEELOCK
27	Jason BECKER
28	Brandon BLUDAU
29	Jason NEWQUIST
42	Matthew JAGGER
44	Steve FASHANT
83	Ryan KASTL

=== 2008 IC Squad ===
2008 IC Squad
Name	Club
Jay Levesque	Baltimore/Washington Eagles
R.J. Wheelock	Baltimore/Washington Eagles
Mickey Kleinhenz	Baton Rouge Tigers
George Lakomy	Boston Demons
Andy Vanica	Boston Demons
Chris Candelaria	Denver Bulldogs
Michael LeValley	Denver Bulldogs
Robert Strange	Denver Bulldogs
Dustin Jones	Florida Redbacks
Andrew Lamont,	Golden Gate Kangaroos
Marty Curry	Las Vegas Gamblers
Rob Lutostanski	Las Vegas Gamblers
Bruce Beilfuss	Milwaukee Bombers
James Brunmeier	Milwaukee Bombers
Jared Brunmeier	Milwaukee Bombers
Mike Busse	Minnesota Freeze
Danny Hansen	Minnesota Freeze
Ryan Marx	Minnesota Freeze
Zachary Weaver	Minnesota Freeze
Luke Nemeth	Nashville Kangaroos
Jeff Persson	Nashville Kangaroos
Dee Vsetecka	Nashville Kangaroos
David Walker	Nashville Kangaroos
Paul Duncan	North Carolina Tigers
Andy Lindsey	Orange County Bombers
Kelly Nelson	Orange County Bombers
Kurth Nelson	Orange County Bombers
Jon Loring	Philadelphia Hawks
Patrick Miller	Philadelphia Hawks
Brandon Blankenship	San Diego Lions
J.J. Cisneros	San Diego Lions
Donnie Lucero	San Diego Lions
Brett Ullman	San Diego Lions
Justin Valley	San Diego Lions
Dan Sarbacker	St. Louis Blues
Dan Sergot	St. Louis Blues

=== 2005 IC Squad ===
2005 IC Squad
Name	Club
Beilfuss, Bruce	Milwaukee Bombers
Blankenship, Brandon	San Diego Lions
Bradley, Frank	Chicago United
Brunmeier, James	Milwaukee Bombers
Brunmeier, Jared	Milwaukee Bombers
Butler, Darrell	St Louis Blues
Carroll, Chris	Baltimore Washington Eagles
Crist, Ben	Atlanta Kookaburras
Curry, Martin	Orange County Bombers
Dainauski, Matt	Denver Bulldogs
Ellis, Charlie	Denver Bulldogs
Ellis, Tom	Denver Bulldogs
Evon, Earl	Boston Demons
Gambaro, BJ	Atlanta Kookaburras
Jagger, Matt	St Louis Blues
Jones, Dustin	Florida Redbacks
Katstra, Jeff	Boston Demons
Kocka, Dan	St Louis Blues
Lakomy, George	Boston Demons
Lewis, Doug	New York Magpies
Loring, Jon	Philadelphia Hawks
Loring, Josh	Philadelphia Hawks
Lucero, Donnie	Orange County Bombers
Lutostanski, Rob	Arizona Hawks
Mueller, Jay	Arizona Hawks
Nelson Aaron	San Diego Lions
Pope, Brad	Arizona Hawks
Purcell, Jeff	Orange County Bombers
Raisanen, Paul	Milwaukee Bombers
Rinklin, Brad	Boston Demons
Sarbacker, Dan	St Louis Blues
Strenski, Kyle	Cincinnati Dockers
Thurmond, Dave	Orange County Bombers
Vsetecka, Dee	Nashville Kangaroos
Walker, David	Nashville Kangaroos

The Revolution's best and fairest player at the 2005 International Cup was Donnie Lucero, and he was named to the 2005 International Cup All Stars Team.

== Development Team ==
The USA Revolution established a Development Team in 2012 (formally the U23 National Team), to develop players trying to work their way to the national team. This squad gives coaches opportunities to evaluate potential players for the next Australian Football International Cup. The Development Team competes against Canada's Development squad in an under-card showdown the night before the 49th Parallel Cup. The United States won the 2015 match, 9.9 (63) to 2.3 (15).

== See also ==
- United States Australian Football League
- USA Freedom (women's)
- Australian Football International Cup
- 49th Parallel Cup
- Australian rules football in the United States
