= Mid American Australian Football League =

MAAFL logo

The Mid American Australian Football League (MAAFL) was a division of the United States Australian Football League and an Australian rules football competition based in the United States.

The league formed 1996 when clubs from Cincinnati and Louisville played the first ever game of Aussie Rules in the United States.

Unlike many Metro Footy leagues in the US, the MAAFL was a traditional 18-a-side Australian rules competition and was the oldest and arguably the best supported league in the country. It still holds the record for attendance.

== Changes ==
As of 2007, the league split its teams into two divisions to reduce travel costs.

After 2013, the MAAFL gave way to the Central Region Tournament, one of three annual regional tournaments organized directly by the United States Australian Football League.

=== Championship Division ===
Location map of current clubs in the Championship Division

Club	Colours	Years in Competition	Premierships
Austin Crows		2015–	2015, 2016, 2018
Chicago Swans		2000–2012 2015–	2001, 2007, 2008, 2009, 2011
Dallas Dingoes		2003–2012 2015–	2005, 2017
Denver Bulldogs		2015–2016, 2018	
Houston Lonestars		2015–	
Nashville Kangaroos		2000–2012, 2015–	2000, 2002, 2010, 2012

=== Second Division ===
Club	Colours	Years in Competition	Premierships
Atlanta Kookaburras		2004–2012, 2015–	
Cincinnati Dockers		2000–2012, 2015–	
Des Moines Roosters		2015–	
Oklahoma Football Club		2018	
St Louis Blues AFC		1996–2012, 2021	2003, 2004

=== Previous Teams ===
Club	Colours	Years in Competition	Premierships
Baton Rouge Tigers		2007–2012	
Cleveland Cannons		2016	
Columbus Jackaroos/Cats		2009–2012, 2015–2017	
Indianapolis Giants		2015–	
Kansas City Power		2001–2003, 2007–2012	
Little Rock Coyotes		2017	
Louisville Kings		2000, 2007–2012,2018	
Milwaukee Bombers		2004–2012,2018	2006
Minnesota Freeze		2007–2009 2015–2017	
New York Magpies		2015	
Ohio Valley River Rats		2013	
Oklahoma City Flyers		2017	
Tulsa Buffaloes		2015–2017	
