= Australian rules football attendance records =

Australian rules football attendance records

== Australia ==
Note: Since the 1970s in Australia, many grounds have been reconfigured without standing room, which reduces maximum capacity.

=== Single matches ===
- Largest home and away crowd involving at least 1 non-Victorian team – 82,326 (2025). AFL 2025 - Round 21 Collingwood v Brisbane Lions (MCG, Melbourne, Victoria)
- Largest home and away crowd involving 2 non-Victorian teams – 62,586 (2007). AFL 2007 - Round 1 Sydney v West Coast (Stadium Australia, Sydney)

==== By Australian State and Territory ====
State	Attendance	Year	League	Event	Venue	Sold out ?
Victoria	121,696	1970	VFL	Grand Final – Carlton v Collingwood	MCG, Melbourne	No
New South Wales	72,393	2003	AFL	Round 21 – Sydney Swans v. Collingwood	Stadium Australia, Sydney	No
South Australia	66,987	1976	SANFL	Grand Final – Sturt vs Port Adelaide	Football Park, Adelaide	Yes
Western Australia	61,118	2021	AFL	Q2021 AFL Grand Final. Melbourne vs Western Bulldogs	Perth Stadium, Perth	Yes
Queensland	37,478	2019	AFL	Qualifying Final – Brisbane Lions vs Richmond	The Gabba, Brisbane	Yes
Tasmania	24,968	1979	TFL	Grand Final – Glenorchy v Clarence	North Hobart Oval, Hobart	Yes
Northern Territory	17,500	2002	AFL (pre-season practice)	Aboriginal All-Stars vs Carlton	Marrara Oval, Darwin	Yes
Australian Capital Territory	14,974	2016	AFL	Round 19 – Greater Western Sydney Giants vs Richmond	Manuka Oval, Canberra	Yes

The table gives official crowd figures only. In the case of the 1976 SANFL Grand Final, the official crowd of 66,987 was the number of tickets sold, but when the SANFL ran out they opened Football Park's gates for free and the crowd grew by an estimated 15,000.

- Largest Crowd outside an Australian capital city – 49,109 (1952). VFL Geelong v Carlton (Kardinia Park, Geelong, Victoria)
- Largest Crowd outside a metropolitan city – 20,971 – (2006). AFL Hawthorn v Richmond (York Park, Launceston, Tasmania)

==== State of Origin Representative Matches ====
- Victoria v. South Australia – 91,960 (1989). (MCG, Melbourne)

=== League Seasons ===
- AFL – 7,594,302. (2018). Number of Games – 207. Average attendance – 36,692
- SANFL – 1,090,164. (1967). Number of Games – 104. Average attendance – 10,482
- WAFL – 960,169. (1967). Number of Games – 88. Average attendance – 10,911
- VFL – 937,291. (1976). Number of Games – 94. Average Attendance – 9,971
- TFL – 318,496. (1967). Number of Games – 58 Average attendance – 5,491

=== League Single Round ===
- AFL – 435,501. Round 1, 2025.

== International ==
=== AFL Premiership matches ===
- New Zealand - 22,546 (2013). St Kilda v. Sydney (Westpac Stadium, Wellington)
- China - 10,689 (2018) Gold Coast v. Port Adelaide (Jiangwan Stadium, Shanghai)

=== Exhibition matches ===
- AFL (VFL/AFL)
  - Canada – 32,789 (1987). Melbourne v. Sydney (B.C. Place, Vancouver)
  - Japan – 25,000 (1986). Carlton v. Hawthorn (Yokohama Stadium, Tokyo)
  - United Kingdom – 18,884 (2005). West Coast v. Fremantle (The Oval, London)
  - USA – 14,787 (1990). Melbourne v. West Coast (Civic Stadium, Portland)
  - New Zealand – 11,666 (2000). Bulldogs v. Hawthorn. (Westpac Stadium, Wellington)
  - South Africa – 10,123 (1998). Brisbane v. Fremantle. (Cape Town)
  - United Arab Emirates – 6,102 (2008). Collingwood v. Adelaide. (Ghantoot Racing & Polo Club, Abu Dhabi)
  - China – 7,100 (2010). Melbourne v. Brisbane Lions. (Jiangwan Stadium, Shanghai)
- Other
  - France – 700 (11 March 2006). Reading Kangaroos v. France (Perpignan)

=== International Representative matches (by country) ===
Attendance	Date	Event	Teams	Venue	City	Notes
10,000	1976	International Test	PNG vs Nauru	Sir Hubert Murray Stadium	Port Moresby, Papua New Guinea	
6,000	2017	International Test	India vs Australia (masters)		Paschim Medinipur district (West Midnapore) India	
5,000	2005	2005 Australian Football International Cup	Japan vs South Africa	City Oval	Wangaratta, Victoria, Australia Australia	
2,500	2007	49th Parallel Cup	Canada vs United States	Thunderbird Stadium	Vancouver, British Columbia Canada	
500	2008	2008 EU Cup Australian rules football	England vs Croatia	Slavia Sports Centre	Prague Czech Republic	
150	2007	2007 European Australian Football Tri-nations Tournament	Finland vs Sweden	Halikko Stadium	Halikko Finland	

Notes

1. The International Cup carnival does not charge for admission, and crowd figures are estimates to the nearest 500 spectators based on total ground capacity. These figures do not include International Rules tests between Australia and Ireland or tests played as curtain raisers to AFL matches.

2. The 49th Parallel Cup charged admission for the first time in 2007.

=== Domestic Representative Matches ===
- Ontario vs Quebec – 500

=== Leagues outside of Australia ===
This is a list of record attendances for leagues outside of Australia. Crowd figures are estimates to the nearest 500 spectators based on total ground capacity. Note: No international Australian Rules Football leagues currently charge for admission (though the POM AFL did in the 1970s).

Attendance	Date	League	Teams	Venue	Country	City	Notes
20,000	2018 (December)	Odisha Australian Football League	State Championships match	Similipal Mini Stadium	India	Bholagoria	
6,000	1977	Port Moresby Australian Rules Football League	Koboni vs Moresby (Grand Final)	Hubert Murray Stadium	Papua New Guinea	Port Moresby	
3,000	1999	Nauru Australian Football Association	Menaida vs Panzer (Championship Finale)	Linkbelt Oval	Nauru	Aiwo	
1,500	1999	British Australian Rules Football League	West London Wildcats vs Wandsworth Demons (Grand Final)	Clapham Common	United Kingdom	London	
1,000	2004	Mid American Australian Football League	Nashville Kangaroos vs Chicago Swans		United States of America	Nashville, Tennessee	
600	2008 (October)	Ontario Australian Football League	Toronto Eagles vs Etobicoke Kangaroos (Grand Final)	Humber Park	Canada	Toronto	
500	2005 (July 12)	West Java Australian Football League (Pancawati Cup)	Pancawati Eagles vs Pancawatti Scorpions (Grand Final)		Indonesia	Pancawati (Bogor)	
