= Danielle Marshall =

American Australian rules football player

Personal information
- Born: 15 August 1991 (age 35)
- Original team: Arizona Hawks (USAFL)/Essendon VFLW/Aberfeldie FC
- Draft: 2019 rookie signing
- Debut: Round 1, 2020, Western Bulldogs vs. St Kilda, at RSEA Park
- Height: 168 cm (5 ft 6 in)
- Position: Forward

Playing career^{1}
Years	Club	Games (Goals)
2020–2021	Western Bulldogs	11 (3)
2022 (S7)–2023	Essendon	12 (1)
Total		23 (4)

International team honours
Years	Team	Games (Goals)
2020–	United States	
- ^{1} Playing statistics correct to the end of the 2023 season.

Danielle Marshall (born 15 August 1991) is a former American Australian rules football player who played for the Western Bulldogs and Essendon in the AFL Women's (AFLW) League. Marshall was the first American and first USA Freedom representative to play in the AFLW league, and the first player recruited to play professionally at AFL level from a club outside Australia.

== Early life ==
Marshall was born on 15 August 1991 in California and raised in Colorado Springs, Colorado. She participated in many sports throughout her childhood, including soccer, basketball, volleyball, rugby union, ultimate frisbee and cross country running. She had aspired to play American football as a free safety or punter, however her mother discouraged her from playing a contact sport, so she chose soccer. After a successful club and high school career, Marshall was recruited by the Colorado School of Mines on a soccer scholarship. She played NCAA Division II tournament soccer for three years between 2009 and 2012. Marshall turned down an offer by the Colorado Rapids Women to continue her studies. During college she was an avid watcher of Australian Football League on ESPN, until the channel stopped broadcasting the sport in 2011.

In 2015, Marshall moved to Phoenix, Arizona with her husband. There she began to focus on ultimate (frisbee) and was voted as her team’s Most Valuable Player in 2017. Marshall attributes her ability in finding space, making leads, and marking to the sport.

In 2017, she joined the USAFL club Arizona Hawks along with her husband Ryan after being told about the club by her friend. She missed selection with the USA Freedom for the 2017 Australian Football International Cup after beginning to play the sport.

During the USAFL offseason in May 2018, she played rugby union with the Tempe Ninjas Women's Rugby Club in the Southern California Rugby Football Union on the wing where she was named Rookie of the Year.

Three weeks later after a match between Denver and Arizona in Los Angeles, one of the Lady Bulldogs playing in a combined team, Sara Edwards Rohner, texted her asking if she wanted to play the game in Australia. American Australian Denver Bulldogs director of coaching James Waddell, and his visiting friend Australian cricket player manager Cam Richardson, who had shown an interest in recruiting the best female players for the Western Bulldogs' women's team, offered to host the two in Melbourne for a professional tryout.

At the 2018 USAFL National Championships, Marshall became the first first-year rookie to win the Paul Roos Medal for Best and Fairest in Division 2. She was named in the Freedom's 2020 Australian Football International Cup squad (the tournament was later cancelled due to the COVID-19 pandemic) and also for the 2021 postponed tournament that was later cancelled.

In early May 2018, she arrived in Melbourne in Australia to attempt a professional career. She trained with the Western Bulldogs but played suburban football at the Aberfeldie Football Club in the Essendon District Football League Women's competition. Former AFL player Shaun Smith recommended her to St Kilda FC and she was invited to the club. Other clubs to express interest included Carlton and Collingwood, however they did not offer her a contract. She did not want to wait for the AFLW Draft to make a commitment to move to Melbourne permanently. The Western Bulldogs offered her a contract and she began playing in the Western Bulldogs VFLW team. Marshall played 10 games for the Western Bulldogs VFLW team in 2019.

== AFLW career ==
Marshall was signed as a rookie by the Western Bulldogs in the 2019 AFLW draft at the mature age of 28. She played her first AFLW game on 9 February 2020 in a match against the St Kilda AFLW team. She joined the prestigious club when she scored a goal with her first kick.

Marshall was delisted by the Bulldogs on 16 June 2021 after playing just 5 games for the season.

She was relisted by AFLW expansion club Essendon Football Club through the 2022 AFL Women's draft. In her first game for her new club in 2022 season 7, she kicked a long range 45 metre goal and was named among the team's best.

Marshall retired from the AFLW at the end of 2023.

== Post-AFL ==
Marshall was selected by the USAFL to represent the United States at the 2024 Trans-Atlantic Cup tournament, and the only AFLW player to participate.

== Statistics ==
Statistics are correct to the end of the 2021 season.

Legend
G	Goals	K	Kicks	D	Disposals	T	Tackles
B	Behinds	H	Handballs	M	Marks

Season	Team	No.	Games	Totals							Averages (per game)							Votes
Season	Team	No.	Games	G	B	K	H	D	M	T	G	B	K	H	D	M	T	Votes
2020	Western Bulldogs	26	6	3	1	24	8	32	5	13	0.5	0.2	4.0	1.3	5.3	0.8	2.2	0
2021	Western Bulldogs	26	5	0	2	13	9	22	5	14	0.0	0.4	2.6	1.8	4.4	1.0	2.8	0
Career			11	3	3	37	17	54	10	27	0.3	0.3	3.4	1.5	4.9	0.9	2.5	0
