= Philadelphia Hawks =

Names
- Full name: Philadelphia Hawks
- Nickname(s): Hawks, Philly Hawks

2019 season

Club details
- Founded: 1998
- Colours: Brown Gold
- Competition: USAFL
- President: Ray Cascella
- Coach: Jon Loring
- Captain(s): Greg Glasgow (Men); Erica Sacci (Women)
- Ground: Lower Perkiomen Valley Park, Oaks, Pennsylvania, U.S.
- Training ground: Fairmount Park, Philadelphia, U.S.

Other information
- Official website: www.phillyhawks.com

The Philadelphia Hawks are an Australian rules football club representing the city of Philadelphia, Pennsylvania in the United States Australian Football League.

Founded in 1998, the team currently place in Eastern Australian Football League and the USAFL's Eastern region.

== History ==
In 1998, a group of ex-pat Australians and American enthusiasts of Australian Rules football founded a team in the city after several kick-arounds at Franklin Delano Roosevelt Park in South Philadelphia. Reaching an agreement with the Adelaide Football Club of the Australian Football League, the team was initially known as the Philadelphia Crows. After modest results in their first three seasons, the Crows would win the 2002 Division III USAFL National Championship in Kansas City, defeating the Milwaukee Bombers in the final, 3.8 (26) to 2.2 (14).

Following the 2003 season, which saw them promoted to Division II, the Hawthorn Football Club, citing the club's success, offered to take over sponsorship from Adelaide. The offer was accepted, and the team became the Philadelphia Hawks, adapting their mother club's colors of brown and gold. That same offseason saw the club absorb the remnants of the defunct Lehigh Valley Crocodiles club, which meant the addition of brothers Josh and Jon Loring.

Entering the 2004 season, the Hawks were considered favorites to win the Division II title at Nationals in Atlanta. They would reach a final for the second time in three seasons, where they would fall to another Hawthorn sponsored club, the Arizona Hawks, by 2 points. A return to the D-II final would come the following year, but a 35-point defeat to the Golden Gate Roos would end the year without a trophy.

After failing to reach the Grand Finals in the next two seasons from Division II, and after falling behind Eastern Australian Football League rivals New York Magpies and Baltimore Washington Eagles, the Hawks were demoted back down to Division III for the 2008 Nationals in Colorado Springs. After a 1-2 finish that year, the team's performance would sink after a disheartening loss to North Carolina at home in June 2009. Using that result as a wake-up call, the Hawks would rebound to win four of their final six matches on the year, ending up one game short of the D-III Grand Final at that year's Nationals.

The improvement lasted into season 2010, highlighted by a win over eventual D-I National Champion New York, and a 3rd place finish in the EAFL. The Hawks were rewarded with a promotion back to D-II after three years, and though they would go 0-3 on the weekend, their improvement had turned heads around the league. The following season saw a return to Division II and another winless campaign at Nationals.

After finally snapping a nine game Nationals losing streak in 2012 by going 1-2, the Hawks were demoted back down to D-III after going through the regular season winless. 364 days after defeating the Portland Steelheads at Nationals in Mason, Philadelphia would end their long drought with victories over Austin Crows reserves and Des Moines Roosters before falling to the Sacramento Suns in the final group match on Saturday.

The 2014 season would be the best in some time for the Hawks, as they picked up several victories on the year and ran through Portland, the Calgary Kangaroos reserves, and Fort Lauderdale Fighting Squids to reach their fourth grand final. Again, however, it would be the Suns who would end the dream with a 43-5 victory in the Grand Final at Dublin, Ohio. Philadelphia would enter the 2015 and 2016 season with hopes of making it back to the Grand Final in those years, but would go 2-1 and 1-2, respectfully, to miss out.

History would be made during the 2016 season, however. After years of planning and false starts, the Philadelphia AusBall league, a non-contact, co-ed program was initiated with the hope of drawing in new recruits for the men's team, and to lay the seeds for the beginning of a women's side. Two of those players, Erica Sacci and Amy Arundale, would be the first women to represent the Philadelphia Hawks in the women's division of the USAFL Nationals, leading a side combined with the Boston Demons and Montreal Angels to a 2nd place finish in women's Division II. A year later, five Lady Hawks combined with the Portland Sockeyes to take out the Women's D2 title at the 2017 Nationals in San Diego.

The men's side would finally see their long premiership drought come to an end at the 2018 Nationals in Racine, Wisconsin. After a regular season that saw a club record seven regular season wins and a first ever Eastern Regional Championship, the Hawks were named as the top seed in Division 3. Despite a 1-1 record on Saturday, Philadelphia advanced to the semifinal as a wild card team. Defeating EAFL rival Columbus Cats in the semi, the Hawks kicked five unanswered goals in the second half of the Grand Final to turn aside the Ohio Valley River Rats, 46-20. Hawks players Jon Loring and Patrick Miller became the first dual premiership players in Hawks history, having been members of the 2002 D3 premiership team.

While the men's team was able to duplicate their Eastern Regional success in 2019, they were unable to secure a second straight National title, going 2-1 in their Division 2 return. The Lady Hawks, however, picked up the slack. Combining with the Arizona Hawks and augmented by players from the Boston Demons and Baltimore Dockers, the Lady Hawks won their second Women's Division 2 title. On the strength of a last minute Casey Troy goal, the Hawks and company defeated the DC Eagles 13-8 in the final.
