= 2018 USAFL National Championships =

- League: United States Australian Football League
- Sport: Australian rules football

USAFL National Championships seasons
- ← 2017 2019 →

The 2018 USAFL National Championships were the 22nd installment of the premier United States annual Australian rules football club tournament.

== 2018 USAFL National Championships club rankings ==
=== Men ===
Rank	Team	Change	State
1	Austin Crows		

=== Women ===
Rank	Team	Change	State
1	San Francisco Iron Maidens		
