= Sports in Sacramento, California =

Sports in American city

The City of Sacramento and the Sacramento metropolitan area are home to two major league professional teams — the Sacramento Kings of the National Basketball Association (NBA) and the Athletics of Major League Baseball (MLB) — as well as numerous minor league and amateur sports teams. Sacramento also has recreational facilities.

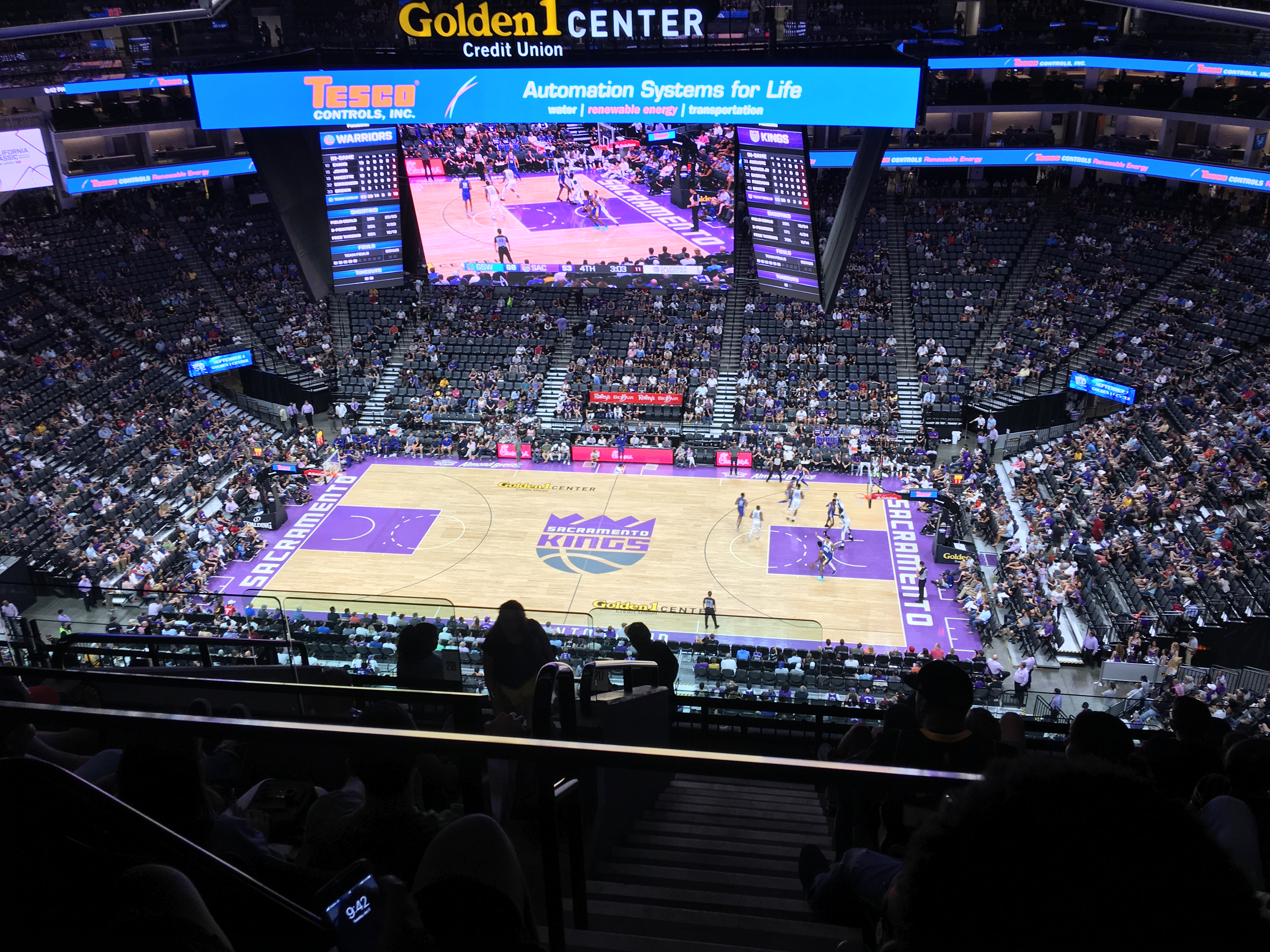
A Sacramento Kings basketball game at Golden 1 Center

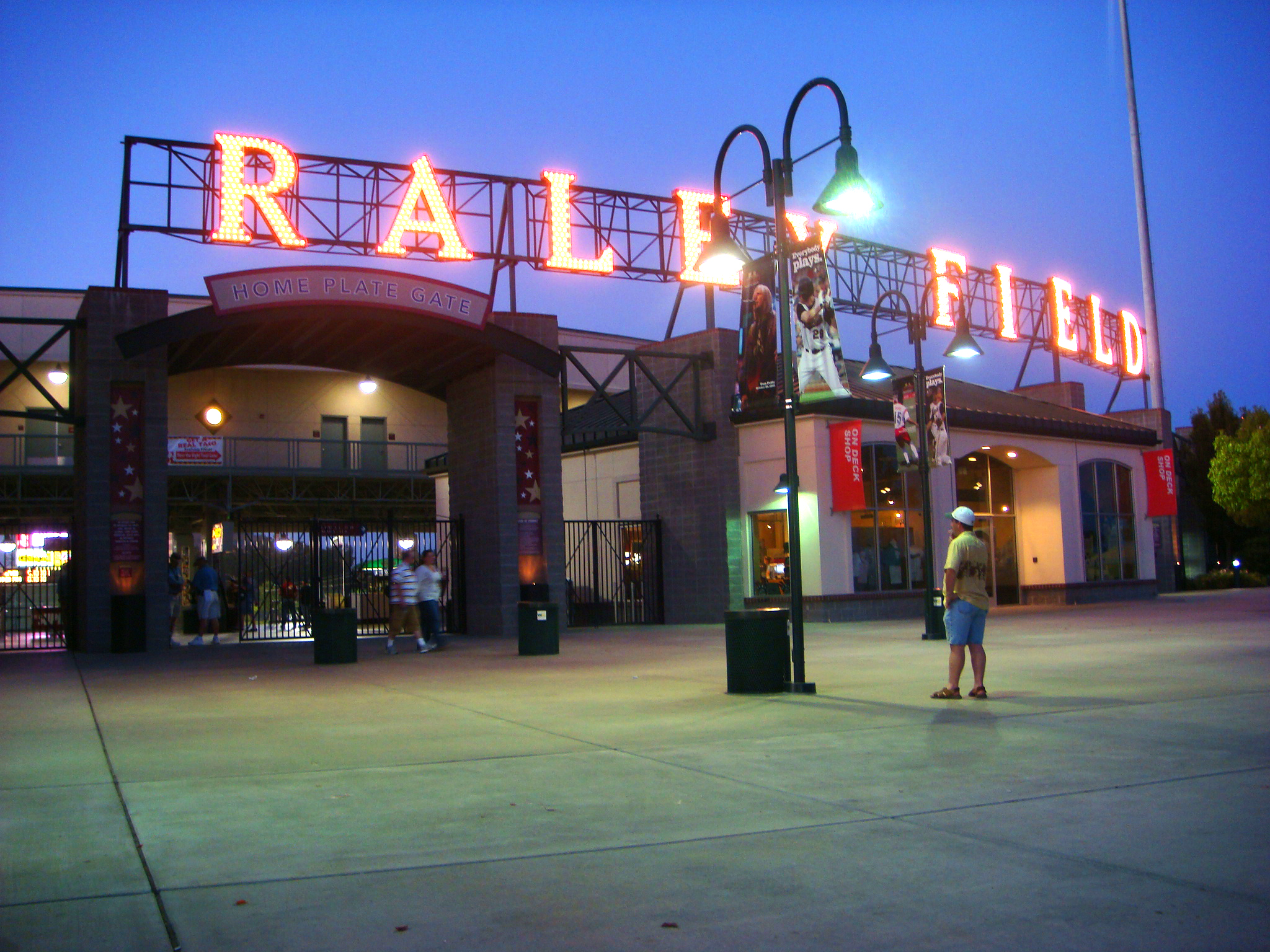
Sutter Health Park, home of the River Cats and temporary home of the Athletics.

== Professional sports ==
Sacramento is home to the Sacramento Kings of the National Basketball Association. The Kings relocated to Sacramento from Kansas City in 1985.

In 2000, AAA minor league baseball returned to Sacramento with the Sacramento River Cats, an affiliate of the San Francisco Giants. The River Cats play at Sutter Health Park, located in West Sacramento.

On April 3, 2024, the Oakland Athletics of Major League Baseball reached an agreement with the City of Sacramento to play at Sutter Health Park on a temporary basis, beginning in 2025 before their permanent move to Las Vegas in 2028.

Sacramento professional teams
Club	League	Sport	Venue	Founded	Championships
Athletics	MLB	Baseball	Sutter Health Park	1901 (2025)	9 World Series titles (5 in Philadelphia, 4 in Oakland, California)
Sacramento Kings	NBA	Basketball	Golden 1 Center	1945 (1985)	1 NBA, 1 NBL (as Rochester Royals)
Sacramento River Cats	PCL	Baseball	Sutter Health Park	1978 (2000)	3 Triple-A, 5 League
Sacramento Republic FC	USLC	Soccer	Heart Health Park	2012	2014 USL Pro Championship

=== Former pro teams ===
The now defunct Sacramento Monarchs of the Women's National Basketball Association were one of the eight founding members of the WNBA, which started in 1997. The Monarchs won the WNBA Championship in 2005 to become the first major, professional sports team in Sacramento to do so. However, the Monarchs team folded in November 2009.

The Sacramento Solons, a minor league baseball team of the Pacific Coast League, played in Sacramento during several periods (1903, 1905, 1909–1914, 1918–1960, 1974–1976), mostly at Edmonds Field.

The Sacramento Express played at Bonney Field (now named Heart Health Park) and began play in the only PRO Rugby season before the league folded.

In the past, the city hosted three professional football teams, the Sacramento Surge of the World League of American Football (who won the World Bowl II on June 6, 1992), the Sacramento Gold Miners of the Canadian Football League, and the Sacramento Attack of the Arena Football League.

== Semi-pro and amateur sports ==
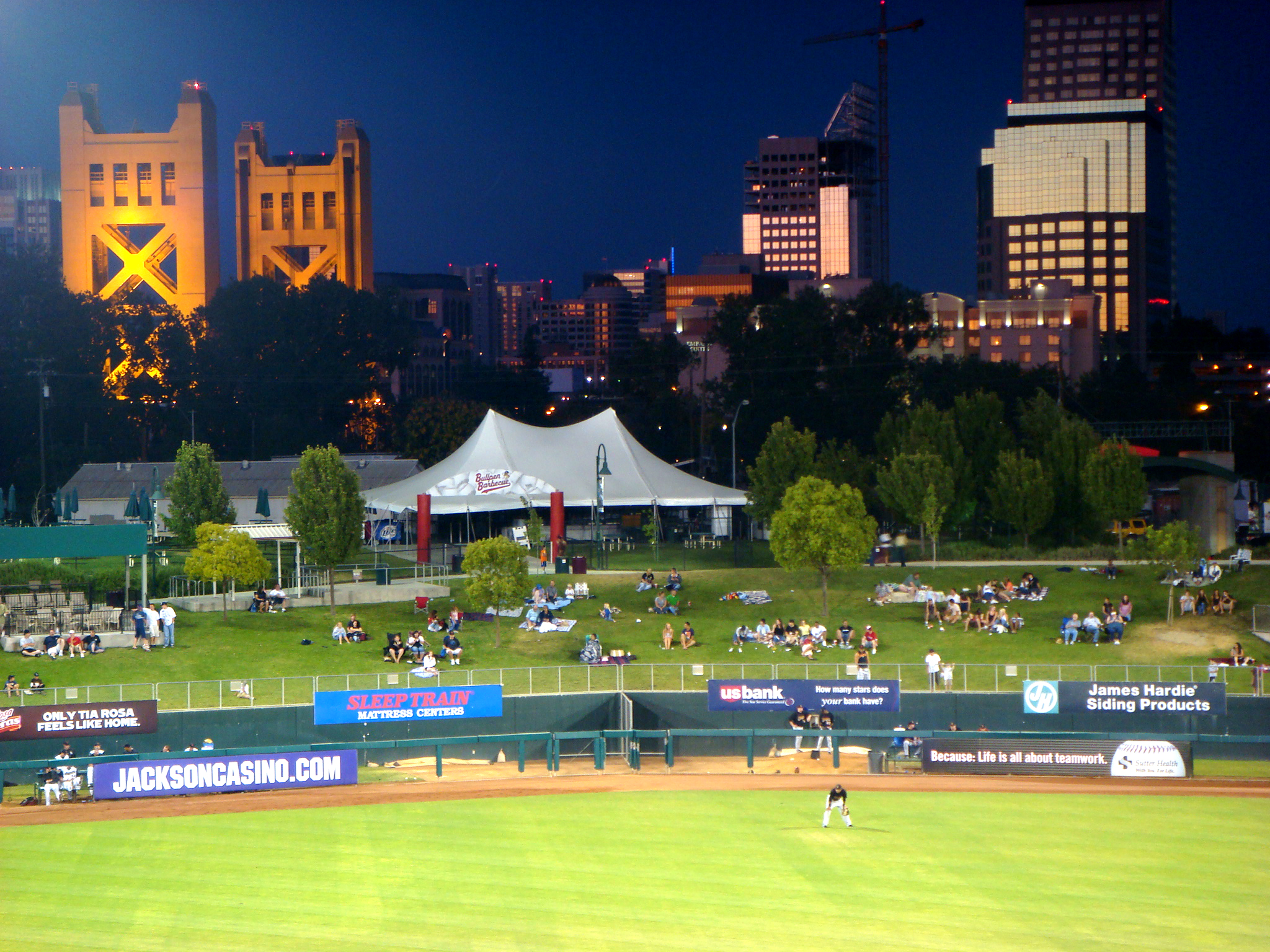
View of the city skyline from Raley Field

Teams in several smaller leagues have been and continue to be in Sacramento. The Sacramento Heatwave of the American Basketball Association currently plays at Folsom High School.

Sacramento was also home to an indoor soccer team, the Sacramento Knights of the Continental Indoor Soccer League (later called the World Indoor Soccer League). The Sacramento XSV (pronounced "excessive") of the National Professional Paintball League represents the City but is based in Modesto, California. The last sports team to come to Sacramento was the Sacramento Mountain Lions which was part of the United Football League (2009). They played at Raley Field, home of the Sacramento River Cats.

Sacramento hosted the 2000 and 2004 USA Olympic Track & Field Trials. The California International Marathon (est. 1983) finishes in front of the Capitol, and attracts a field of international elite runners who vie for a share of the $50,000 prize purse. The fast point-to-point course begins in Folsom and is popular for runners seeking to achieve a Boston Marathon qualifying time and fitness runners. The Sacramento Mile is a national flat-track motorcycle racing event. From 1961 to 1980, Sacramento hosted the Camellia Bowl, which selected or helped select ten national champions in college football's lower divisions.

Club	League	Sport	Venue	Founded	Championships
Sacramento Capitals	WTT	Tennis	Allstate Stadium	1987	5
Sacramento Heatwave	ABA	Basketball	Natomas H.S. Event Center	2003	
Sacramento Gold	NPSL	Soccer	Cosumnes River College	2003	1
Sacramento Sirens	IWFL	Football	Foothill High School	2001	1 WAFL, 3 IWFL
Sacramento Pride	WPSL	Soccer	Lincoln High School	1995	
Sacramento Surge	PASL	Indoor Soccer	McClellan Park	2012	
Sacramento Suns	USAFL	Australian Football	Various	2009	2 D2, 1 D3

== College and high school sports ==
The Sacramento area is home to two NCAA Division 1 sports programs — Sacramento State, which fields 21 varsity sports, most in the Big Sky Conference; and UC Davis, which fields 23 varsity teams, most in the Big West Conference.

Sacramento has frequently hosted the NCAA Men's Outdoor Track and Field Championship as well as the 1st and 2nd rounds of the NCAA Men's Division I Basketball Championship.

Sacramento has several high school rugby programs. Jesuit High School has won six national championships. Christian Brothers has placed second in national competitions. Granite Bay, Burbank, Del Campo, Sierra Foothills, and Vacaville have also participated in national competitions. The Sacramento Valley High School Rugby Conference hosts a preseason youth and high school rugby tournament.

== Recreation ==
Sacramento hosts some recreational facilities and events. The Jedediah Smith Memorial Trail that runs between Old Sacramento and Folsom Lake grants access to the American River Parkway, a natural area that includes more than 5,000 acres (20 km^{2}) of undeveloped land. It attracts cyclists and equestrians from across the state. The California State Fair is held in Sacramento each year at the end of the summer, ending on Labor Day. In 2010, the State Fair moved to July. More than one million people attended this fair in 2001.

Among other recreational options in Sacramento is Discovery Park, a 275-acre (1.1 km^{2}) park studded with stands of mature trees and grasslands. This park is situated where the American River flows into the Sacramento River.

In amateur sports, Sacramento claims many prominent Olympians such as Mark Spitz, Debbie Meyer, Mike Burton, Summer Sanders, Jeff Float (all swimming), and Billy Mills (track). Coach Sherm Chavoor founded his world famous Arden Hills Swim Club just east of the city and trained Burton, Myer, Spitz and others.
