= Bholagoria =

Bholagoria is a village located in Panrui, Birbhum district, West Bengal, India. Bholagoria has a population of 1,235 and includes a mosque, a primary school, and a madrasa. The entire population practices Islam. The economy is centered on agriculture. Neighboring villages include Neturi and Mirzapur. In this village there is a madrasa named Bholagoria-Ahmaadia High Madrasa . It has a playground. In this village, there is an EDD-Gah maidan. Bholagoria village is under Panrui police station.
