= Baton Rouge Tigers =

Australian rules football team

Names
- Full name: Baton Rouge Tigers Australian Football Club
- Nickname: Tigers

Club details
- Founded: 2004
- Colours: Navy Gold
- Competition: USAFL
- President: Samuel Ayers
- Coach: Robert Montanaro
- Ground: Clark Park

Other information
- Official website: batonrougetigers.com

The Baton Rouge Tigers is an Australian Rules Football club, based in Baton Rouge, Louisiana, United States. It was founded in 2004. They play in the USAFL.

2024 Roster

Austin LeBouef, Brennon Story, Brookes Guay, Bryant Dugas, Chance Mire, Cole Hilgenkamp, Cory Dugas, Dan Metzinger, Daniel Hill, Garrett Remson, Jake Ricca, Jerome Weil, John Zimmerman, Harris Bienn, Kameron Horak, Leah Cameron, Luke Beckner, Matt Taylor, Patrick Vines, Rayne Cooper, Rob Montanaro, Ryan Moran, Samuel Ayers, Sean Duffy, Stephen Doerfler, Will Mussack, Brennon Story, Cory Dugas, Luke Beckner

- 2024 Season Summary

After several years of little growth due to players moving away, having children, and aging out the Tigers experienced a groundswell of motivation at the end of the 2023 season. A few members went to USAFL Nationals and played with the Ft. Lauderdale Squids where they rediscovered a passion for the game. Officer change over at the end of the 2023 season led to the election of Samuel Ayers as president, Brookes Guay as vice-president, newcomer Bryant Dugas as Treasurer, and Rob Montanaro as Coach/umpire/Treasurer. Together they reached out to all the players, calling for a renewed approach to the team. At a 2023 Grand Final watch-party the team met visiting Aussie, Leah Cameron. Here on a work visa and eager to find Aussie community, she instantly clicked with the group helping take on key managerial and recruiting rolls. By the Christmas party that year a new, more focused approach had been set. Several players (Chance Mire and Will Mussack) from the greater-New Orleans area began practicing and recruiting adding to the Tiger's ranks. By the 2024 April Tournament the Tigers dressed out nearly 30 players. With many new recruits the Tigers experienced many learning curves and growing pains that led to only one positive scoring result the entire season. Nevertheless, the Tigers brought 20 players to USAFL nationals, the largest showing in club history. Though the Tigers met a bitter 0-3 end to the season the renewed commitment from all the players was viewed as nothing but a success.

This success translated in 2025 with New Orleans developing its own, independent team, the Bayou Brawlers.

2025 Roster Brookes Guay, Bryant Dugas, Cole Hilgenkamp, Daniel Hill, Garrett Remson, Jake Ricca, Jerome Weil, Harris Bienn, Matt Taylor, Rob Montanaro, Samuel Ayers, Stephen Doerfler, James Canfield, Dylan "Bob" Bienvenu, Logan Huval, Andrew Alleman, Hank Webb.
