= Calgary Kookaburras =

Names
- Full name: Calgary Australian Football Club
- Nickname: The Kookaburras

2008 season
- After finals: 1
- Leading goalkicker: Holly Greatwich
- Best and fairest: Erin LeBlanc

Club details
- Founded: 2007
- Colours: Navy, Aqua, Yellow
- Competition: Canada Women's Australian Football League
- President: Jake Anson
- Coach: Jake Anson
- Captain: Kathryn Zakus
- Ground: Queen Elizabeth School

Other information
- Official website: www.albertafooty.com

The Calgary Kookaburras is a ladies' Australian rules football club based in Calgary, Alberta, Canada. They play at the Queen Elizabeth School, Hillhurst and are members of AFL Canada. They were the first women's football club formed in Canada.

== History ==
The Calgary Kookaburras were formed on April 30, 2007, at a meeting of five girls at Hillhurst's Riley Park. Jake Anson was appointed as the club's inaugural coach, with Bri Johnstone as the club's first captain.

The first major tournament that club members participated in was the first women's international matches of Australian football, held at Vancouver's Thunderbird Stadium on August 4 & 5. Fourteen Calgary Kookaburras represented Canada in matches against the USA national team.

The club continued to gain momentum on- and off-field throughout 2007. The club developed an independent club structure in August, to focus on growing women's Australian football throughout southern Alberta. In October, the club was invited to compete in the US National Championships, held in Louisville, Kentucky. The Calgary squad combined with women from the Washington First Lady Eagles to compete in the championships. The combined team lost three official matches against Arizona, Milwaukee and Atlanta. In an unofficial match, Calgary 6.7 (43) defeated Washington 4.2 (26).

In 2008, a full pre-season and some innovative recruiting saw the club grow to become the largest women's footy team outside Australia. Two feeder clubs were formed to provide regular match practice for players and the club's profile in the Calgary community grew through exposure in the press and on television. In October the club again competed in the US National Championships, held in Colorado Springs, Colorado. The squad performed outstandingly and went through the tournament undefeated to become only the second women's football club to win the championship. Calgary 4.3 (27) defeated Atlanta 3.4 (22) in the final.

In 2011, the Calgary Kookaburras again traveled to Austin, Texas to compete in the 2011 Nationals hosted by the United States Australian Football League. Coach Holly Greatwich, formerly of the Bridgetown Bulldogs and a former Kookaburras player, became the first-ever female coach of an international women's AFL team.

== Tournament Championships ==
Alberta Cup (Gaelic Football) Champions Calgary, AB - 2007

US National Champions Colorado Springs, CO - 2008

Canadian National Champions Vancouver, BC - 2009

== Feeder Clubs ==
The Alberta Footy Women's League was formed in 2008 to provide intra-club competition for the Calgary Kookaburras representative team. Calgary currently fields two sides in the competition:

- Hillhurst Nighthawks
- Kensington Kingfishers
