= Milwaukee Bombers =

Australian rules football team

Names
- Full name: Milwaukee Bombers Australian rules Football Club
- Nickname: Bombers

Club details
- Founded: 1998
- Dissolved: 2014
- Colours: Red Black
- Competition: United States Australian Football League

Other information
- Official website: http://www.milwaukeebombers.com/

The Milwaukee Bombers is a United States Australian Football League team, based in Milwaukee, Wisconsin, United States. It was founded in 1998. They play in the Mid American Australian Football League.
