= Arizona Hawks =

Australian Rules Football Team

Names
- Full name: Arizona Hawks Australian Rules Football Club
- Nickname: AZHawks

Club details
- Founded: 1999
- Colours: White Brown Yellow
- Competition: USAFL
- President: 2024: Darren Batemen
- Coach: 2024: Darren Henderson
- Captain: Darren Batemen
- Ground: Fiesta Sports Park / Mesa High School

Other information
- Official website: azhawksfooty.com

The Arizona Hawks is a United States Australian Football League team, based in Arizona, United States. It was founded in 1998 by Jess Keller and then fully functional by Andrew Ashworth in 1999, becoming the first Australian rules football club in Arizona.

The Hawks have won the USAFL National Championships Men's Div 2 Grand Final in 2004, the Men's Div 3 Grand Final in 2011, 2021 and were runner up in 2022. The Women's Team were runners up in the Women's Div 1 Grand Final in 2007.

Arizona Hawk Dani Marshall was drafted to the AFLW in 2020 to play the sport professionally in Australia.
