= San Diego Lions =

Australian rules football team

Names
- Full name: San Diego Lions Australian rules Football Club
- Nickname: Lions

Club details
- Founded: 1997
- Colours: Maroon, blue, and gold
- Competition: United States Australian Football League
- Premierships: 2001, 2006

Other information
- Official website: http://www.sandiegolions.com/

The San Diego Lions are an Australian rules football team based in San Diego, California, that competes in the United States Australian Football League (USAFL). The Lions began play in the 1997 season.

== History ==
The Lions won the USAFL Division 1 premiership in 2001 and 2006, Division 2 premiership in 2019, and Division 4 premiership in 2015.
