= Columbus Cats =

Australian Football Team

Columbus Cats AFC

Names
- Full name: Columbus Cats Australian Rules Football Club
- Nickname: Cats
- Former nickname(s): Jackaroos, Jillaroos
- Motto: The Greatest by far...

Club details
- Founded: 2008
- Colours: blue, white
- Competition: United States Australian Football League
- President: Dan Raver
- Coach: Andrew "Fab" Sobol
- Premierships: D-2 2013
- Ground: Three Creeks Metro Park (capacity: 500)
- Training ground: Varies, see website for current field

Other information
- Official website: https://columbusafc.com/

The Columbus Cats AFC are an Australian Rules football team based in the city of Columbus, Ohio. The team is a part of the wider Columbus ARFC Inc. organization which is a nationally recognized nonprofit organization. The Cats compete in the United States Australian Football League and were Division Two national champions in 2013 and Division Three runner-up in 2012.

== History ==
The first game of Australian Rules Football in the United States was played in 1996 between the Cincinnati Dockers and the Louisville Kings. Cincinnati hosted the first national tournament in 1997 and the USAFL was founded by clubs in attendance.

Chet Ridenour, a Worthington, Ohio native, discovered the sport on a backpacking trip to Australia and joined the Cincinnati Dockers in 2007. He and Dockers full back Matthew Reiss initially recruited players to train for the Dockers in Columbus. Eventually, they established the Columbus Australian Rules Football Club, including former Dockers and Nashville Kangaroos and six players from a previous local Aussie Rules movement known as the Columbus Lighthorse. Recruitment was easy for the newly formed club, as Ridenour initially tapped into his vast sporting network associated with Thomas Worthington High School. Columbus played their inaugural game on July 19, 2008 at Cincinnati and came away with a 8.8(58) to 5.6(36) victory over the more veteran Dockers.

The team competed in the 2008 national championship and grew through 2009 and 2010, becoming known as the Columbus Jackaroos and obtaining their first win at the USAFL national championships over the Las Vegas Gamblers in 2010.

In 2010, the Jackaroos inaugurated a women's team called the Jillaroos, coached by Ridenour and Alan Gardener. Players from this team joined with players from Arizona to compete in the 2010 national championship, chalking up losses to Calgary/Montreal and Denver.

Former Marine John Fisher took over as coach in 2011. Fisher's style of play emphasized hard running and handball. In 2011, the Jackaroos dismantled the Nashville Kangaroos and the North Carolina Tigers but key players missing at Nationals in Austin, Texas, meant the team went winless. The following season, Columbus enjoyed its first ever win over the Chicago Swans and performed consistently all year. The Jackaroos competed in Division 3 of the 2012 national championships, defeating Kansas City, North Carolina, and Atlanta, finally losing to the Chicago Swans in the Division 3 grand final 4.7(31) to 3.4(22).

In 2013, the Jackaroos only dropped one game heading in to Nationals in Austin; this form raised them into Division 2. In pool play, the Jackaroos defeated Baltimore/Washington, Minnesota and New York. The Division 2 grand final was played against the Los Angeles Dragons, ending with a 5.5(35) to 1.5(11) victory for the Jackaroos and the first championship cup in the history of the club.

In 2018, the club went through a rebrand and changed to the Columbus Cats to consolidate the men's and women's names and align with AFL club Geelong for additional support.
