= Atlanta Kookaburras =

Australian rules football team

Names
- Full name: Atlanta Kookaburras Australian Rules Football Club
- Nickname: Kookaburras

Club details
- Founded: 1998
- Colours: Green Gold White
- Competition: USAFL
- Premierships: USAFL women's (3): 2005, 2006, 2007

Other information
- Official website: www.atlantafooty.com

The Atlanta Kookaburras is a United States Australian Football League team, based in Atlanta, United States. It was founded in 1998. They play in the USAFL.
