= Seattle Grizzlies =

Australian rules football team

Names
- Full name: Seattle Grizzlies Australian Rules Football Club
- Nickname: Grizzlies
- Leading goalkicker: Max DePina
- Best and fairest: Brian Flaherty

Club details
- Founded: 1997
- Colours: Black Green
- Competition: USAFL
- President: Robert Munn
- Coach: Andrew Donlen, David Tomaselli
- Captain: Saleh Tyebjee
- Premierships: 2008 USAFL Men's Division 2 2016 USAFL Women's Division 2, combined team 2017 USAFL Men’s Division 3 2025 USAFL Men's Division 2
- Ground: Magnuson Park, Seattle

Other information
- Official website: seattlegrizzlies.com
- Guernsey: Black with green yoke

The Seattle Grizzlies is a United States Australian Football League team, based in Seattle, Washington, United States. It was founded in 1998 as the Seattle Jets by Matt Muller, Jim Trenerry, and Brendan Jenkins. They play in the USAFL, winning the Division 2 title in 2008 and most recently Division 3 in 2017. The club expanded in 2016 to include a women's team.

During the 2008 season, they played at Manhattan Park in Burien, a suburb of Seattle.
