= Calgary Kangaroos =

Australian rules football club in Alberta, Canada

Names
- Full name: Calgary Kangaroos Australian Rules Football Club
- Nickname(s): Kangaroos, Roos

Club details
- Founded: 2002
- Colours: Blue white
- Competition: AFL Canada USAFL
- Premierships: USAFL Men's Division 2(3): 2009, 2010, 2016
- Grounds: Inland Athletic Park
- A E Cross High School

Other information
- Official website: http://www.foxsportspulse.com/club_info.cgi?client=1-7993-111808-0-0

The Calgary Kangaroos is an Australian rules football club based in Calgary, Alberta, Canada. They welcome all new players, regardless of prior experience, practice at A E Cross High School in Glamorgan, play games at the Inland Athletic Park and are members of AFL Canada. The Roos also run introductory training sessions at various elementary and high schools across the city, in an effort to grow the sport locally. The current number one ticket holder of the club is former Calgary City Mayor, the Honourable Naheed Nenshi

The Calgary Kangaroos regular season consists of a series of home and away games between the three (3) Metro teams the Bears, Cowboys and Wolves. The Wolves team were created in 2015 owing to the growth of the club, and went on to win the Calgary Metro Championship in their inaugural year. During the season there are trips to Banff, Vancouver, Kelowna and Edmonton. The trip to Edmonton is to play for the Capitol Cup in addition to hosting the Stampede Cup locally.

The Calgary Kangaroos are Canada's most successful football club having been a regular feature in the USAFL National Championships finals. The Roos were Division Two runners up in 2008, and then went on to win back-to-back Division Two titles in 2009 and 2010, earning a Division One promotion. In 2011, Calgary played their way through to the Grand Final, but lost to a more accurate Denver 3.2.20 to 0.5.5. The less said about 2012 the better. In 2013, Calgary again played its way into the Division One Grand Final, being beaten by the home team, Austin Crows 4.2.26 to 4.1.25.

In 2014, the Roos had 13 Canadian players selected to represent Team Canada in both the men's and women's competitions at the 2014 AFL International Cup in Melbourne, Australia.

== Team Awards ==
=== Bears ===
Year	Best & Fairest	Canadian Best & Fairest	Best First Year Player
2016	Dan McLeod	Armand Godbout	Don Rumford
2015	Liam Terrell	Bruce Gillis	Allan Crane
2014	David Kalinowski	Andrew MacLean	David Swinden
2013	David Kalinowski	Andy Yardy	-
2012	Luke Kelleher	-	-
2011	Jack Moddle	Jack Moddle	Mark Terstappan

=== Cowboys ===
Year	Best & Fairest	Canadian Best & Fairest	Best First Year Player
2016	Michael Karutz	Trent Loosemore	Brett Ellis
2015	Michael Karutz	Mathew Kidd	Joshua Mason
2014	Dane Rolfe	Mathew Kidd	Kevin Zucht
2013	Dane Rolfe	Matthia Singh	-
2012	Dan Morrison	-	-
2011	Dan Morrison	Matthia Singh	Dan Findlay

=== Wolves ===
Year	Best & Fairest	Canadian Best & Fairest	Most Improved
2016	-	-	-
2015	Keith Vogler	David Swinden	Anthony Singh

== Club Awards ==
=== Coach of The Year ===
Year	Name
2016	Dane Rolfe
2015	Matt Bell

=== Umpire of The Year ===
Year	Name
2016	Peter Dinnick
2015	Peter Dinnick & Milo Lombardi
2014	Peter Dinnick & Milo Lombardi

=== Troy Rose Award ===
Year	Name
2016	Allan Crane
2015	Lachlan Griffiths
2014	Lachlan Griffiths
2013	David Kalinowski
2012	Gareth Williams
2011	Jack Moddle
2010	William Grant
2009	David Rowe
2008	Beau Corps
2007	Gareth Williams
2006	Bradley Copeland
2005	Kristen Judge
2004	Chris O'Connell
2003	Chris O'Connell
2002	Troy Rose

== Championship Results ==
=== Calgary Champions ===
Year	Calgary Champion
2016	Cowboys
2015	Wolves
2014	Bears
2013	Cowboys
2012	Bears
2011	Cowboys
2010	Bears

=== USAFL (United States Australian Football League) ===
Year	USAFL Nationals Result
2016	Div 2 Champion
2015	Div 1 Pool B
2014	Div 1 Pool B
2013	Div 1 Runners Up
2012	No Comment
2011	Div 1 Runners Up
2010	Div 2 Champion
2009	Div 2 Champion
