= Dallas Dingoes =

Australian rules football team

Names
- Full name: Dallas Dingoes Australian Rules Football Club
- Nickname: Dingoes
- Former nickname(s): Magpies, Outlaws

Club details
- Founded: 1997
- Colours: Blue and Gold
- Competition: United States Australian Football League
- Coach: Jeff Kraemer
- Captain: Zac McKinney
- Training ground: Lake Highlands Park, Dallas, TX

Other information
- Official website: Official website

The Dallas Dingoes are an Australian Rules Football team based in Dallas, Texas, United States. Formed in 1997 as the Dallas Outlaws, the team would play under that moniker until 2000. In that year the team changed its name to the Dallas Magpies after forming an alliance with the Collingwood Magpies of the Australian Football League (AFL). In 2018, a few years after the end of the partnership with the Collingwood Magpies, the club re-branded as the Dallas Dingoes.

== Team history ==
=== Dallas Outlaws (1997–2000) ===
Formed in 1997 by Brett Ryan, Andrew Holland, and Chad Stover as the first Australian rules football team in Dallas.

=== Dallas Magpies (2000–2019) ===
In 2000 Dallas Outlaws formed an alliance with the Collingwood Magpies, taking on the Magpies' nickname and a similar logo. The Magpies were the subject of league controversy in 2012 and were found to have cheated, breaking league rules and were subsequently stripped of a Division title.

=== Dallas Dingoes (2019 – Present) ===
After several years of no association with the Collingwood Magpies due to the 2012 scandal, the team leadership decided to re-brand as the Dallas Dingoes.

== Team information ==
=== Fields ===
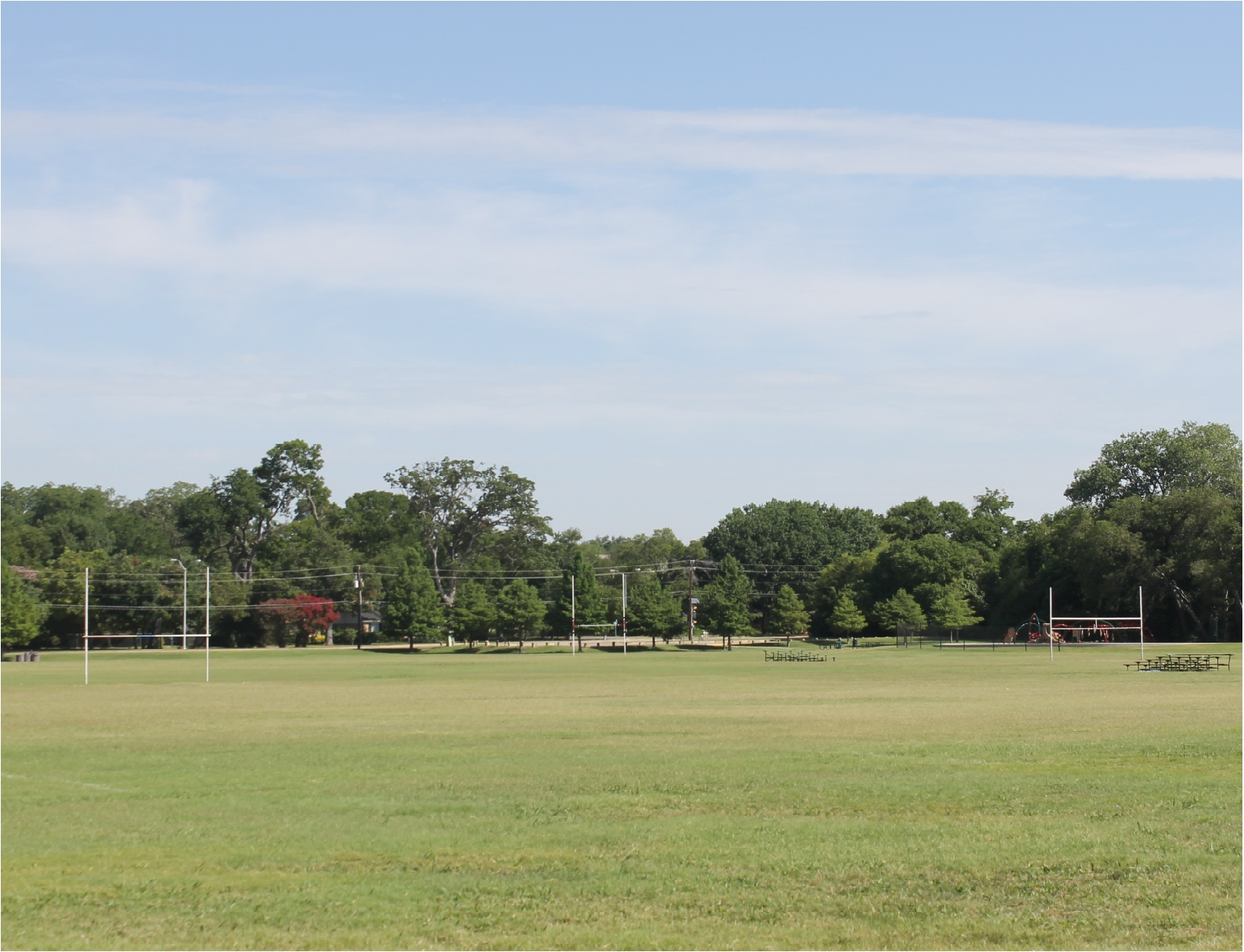
Lake Highlands Park

==== Practice ====
The Dingoes primary practice location is Lake Highlands Park.

==== Match ====
Games are held in different places around the metro, at fields depending on scheduling and size of event. Lake Highlands park will host smaller match-ups. Larger events such as the Central Regional Championship take place at the Harold Patterson Sports Center in Arlington. Celebration Park in Allen has also played host to events, such as the Texas Cup.

=== Logo and jersey design ===
The logo depicts a howling dingo in front of the Dallas skyline, with the Southern Cross and the Lone Star in the sky around the towers.

== Season Results ==
=== Nationals Results ===
2011 – Division 2 Champions 2012 - Division 1 Champions (revoked) 2009 – Division 3 Champions

== Players ==
=== Notable players ===
Brett Ryan – Club Founder

Andrew Holland – Club Founder

Chad Stover – Club Founder

John Battaglia – Member of 2001 USA Revolution Squad competing in the Atlantic Alliance Cup

Brandon Blankenship – 2003 USA Revolution team member; competed in 49th Parallel Cup.

Stu Rackham – USAFL Team of the Decade (1997–2007)

Stephen Bass – US representative in the 2009 49th Parallel Cup.

Stephen Moore – US representative in 2009 & 2010 49th Parallel Cup.

Craig Storer – 2009 Coopers Medal For Most Consistent

Jarrad Rexillius – 2011 Geoff Cann Medal for MVP in Final

Jason Sutherland – 2012 Geoff Cann Medal for MVP in Final

David Grzesiak – US representative in the 2017 International Cup.

Zac McKinney – 2020 International Cup roster member.

== Team Leaders ==
=== Coaches ===
==== Former ====
Adrian "Aido" Beatty

Chris "Willo" Willis: 2017

Clay Roy: 2018

Darren Gray: 2019

==== Current ====
Jeff Kraemer

=== Captains ===
Current

None
