= Golden Gate Roos =

Australian rules football league

Names
- Full name: Golden Gate Roos Australian Rules Football Club

Club details
- Founded: 1998
- Competition: USAFL Western Regionals
- Premierships: USAFL D-1 men’s (1): 2017; USAFL D-1 women's (1): 2016

Other information
- Official website: http://www.ggafl.com/

The Golden Gate Roos are a United States Australian Football League team, based in San Francisco, California, United States. The team was founded in 1998. Its mascot is the Australian marsupial kangaroo adopting the nickname of the Kangaroos club in the Australian Football League. Golden Gate won the USAFL National Championship in 2017.

The club's women's side is known as the Golden Gate Iron Maidens and area dominant women's side in the history of the USAFL National Championships, having won it in 2016, 2017, 2018, 2019, 2021 and 2022.
