= Denver Bulldogs =

Australian rules football team

Names
- Full name: Denver Bulldogs Australian Rules Football Club
- Nickname(s): Bulldogs, Dogs, Doggies

Club details
- Founded: 1997
- Colours: Blue Red White
- Competition: USAFL
- President: Dylan Braun
- Premierships: USAFL D-1 men's (8): 2000, 2002, 2003, 2004, 2005, 2007, 2009, 2011; USAFL women's (6): 2010, 2011, 2012, 2013, 2014, 2015
- Ground: Washington Heights Park

Other information
- Official website: denverbulldogs.com

The Denver Bulldogs are a United States Australian Football League (USAFL) club, based in Denver, Colorado, United States. Founded in 1997, the club is currently composed of a Division 1 men's team, a Division 1 women's team, and a Reserves men's team. The Denver Bulldogs are one of the most successful club in USAFL history, having won eight men's national championships and six consecutive women's national championships.

== Formation ==
The Denver Bulldogs were founded in 1997. Since the beginning of recorded games in 1999, the men's team have 8 national championships, and the women's team - The Denver Lady Bulldogs (founded in 2007) have 6 national championships. Several people played a major role in the founding of the Bulldogs, Craig Jones is considered the person who got it all going as the contact for Denver via the old USAFA website. Initially, the list of people was short, and time passed for nearly a year before anyone met or organized a kick.

Emails were exchanged discussing the club and what we should name it, along with several aborted weekend kicks. As other teams across the country were sprouting up, they were able to secure a sister-club relationship with an AFL club back in Australia. Jones negotiated a deal with the Western Bulldogs who promised a set of used jumpers. After many emails, and phone calls, the inaugural kick was set for the Sunday of the Labor Day weekend of 1998, at Denver's City Park. Two people, Craig Jones and Jim Baldwin were the only attendees. The following week, a Saturday, Jones, Baldwin, and Dainauski were joined by more founding members of the club, Rusty Waugh, Paul Renouf, John Hevko, Charley Ellis, Greg Merritt, and Mick Daly. Week after week, more people showed up; skills were the focus, as many had never played a game of footy before. Craig Jones was elected president, Jonas Stoltz VP, Paul Renouf Secretary, and Mick Daly Treasurer. The club was slowly becoming organized. Finally, in early October 1998, the first Aussie Football match was played in Denver. On a shortened oval, two teams of 12 faced off: ‘Renouf’s Rejects’ versus the ‘President's team’. Stoltz initiated the setup of the Bulldogs club website, Craig Jones had T-shirts made up, and the Bulldogs were gaining an identity.

The Bulldogs played the Denver Gaels in a match of International Rules Football on April 11, 1999, at Observatory Park. The Bulldogs won the first of many matches with their Irish neighbors.

Denver played its inaugural tournament in Aptos, California, in late April 1999. The inaugural "Original Bulldogs" squad played Santa Cruz and Orange County (3 games), winning one game, losing two.

Jones was in touch with AFL legend Paul Roos during this time and arranged for him to come to Denver, prior to the US v Canada international game.

Many of the original Bulldogs, both expat & Americans had the chance to be voted by Jones to play in the inaugural International match against Canada. Paul Roos and Jones were the coaches and the USA team ran away with a win, while Renouf “ran wild at 1/2 time”

First club game: versus Santa Cruz Kangaroos; Santa Cruz 4:4 (28) Denver 2.1 (13).
First ever point in club history: Mick Daly.
First goals in club history: Scott Livingstone (1); Jimbo Baldwin (2).

Denver played in the Kansas City tournament in June 1999. Winning its first tournament ever, the Bulldogs defeated Cincinnati Dockers, Kansas City Power, and Chicago Swans. Matt Dainauski led all tournament goal kickers with 10 for the three games.

Denver played in its first USAFL nationals tournament in Cincinnati, Ohio in October 1999. The Bulldogs defeated the Chicago Swans at the siren after Paul Renouf's free kick was awarded in front of goal. The New York Magpies defeated Denver in the second game. Denver defeated the Nashville Kangaroos behind the Benny Harling/Tom Ellis/Charley Ellis midfield and the back line of Rusty Waugh, Charles Richards, and Jimbo Baldwin. In the quarter-finals, Denver faced the Santa Cruz Kangaroos led by former AFL player John Ironmonger; the Bulldogs were defeated, finishing their inaugural USAFL season with 6 wins and 4 losses.

== 2014 ==
=== Season ===
The Denver men lost just two games all season against the Austin Crows and Minnesota Freeze. Coincidentally enough, they would face these two teams at the nationals in the opening rounds.

=== National Titles ===
The Bulldogs lost their opening game in a close match up against Orange County by a score of 23–18. Chris Candelaria was best on ground for the Bulldogs. In the days later game, the Bulldogs fell to Minnesota Freeze 3.2.20 to 4.6.30. To finish the tournament the Bulldogs beat the previous year's premiers, the Austin Crows, 5.5.35 to 1.3.9. The reserves first match of the tournament was a comfortable 54 -18 win over the Houston LoneStars. In the last match up of day 1 the Bulldogs reserves had a very easy win 81–9 against the Minnesota Freeze Reserves. After a terrific opening day the Denver Reserves tangled with Tulsa Buffaloes for Pool A honors. For a chance at a spot in the grand final, the Denver reserves beat the Tulsa Buffaloes 31–17. The show down of division four saw Denver take on North Carolina. The balanced side of the Denver reserves eventually lost by 14 points to the fast-paced North Carolina Tigers.

The Denver Lady Bulldogs allowed a total of eight points in their first two games with wins over the Boston/Columbus/Minnesota combo and a squeaky win over the new-look Calgary Kookaburras have them at 2-0 after Saturday. This gave the ladies their 19th straight win at nationals. The Lady Bulldogs took on the San Francisco Iron Maidens and go into the half time break with an 8-point lead. With a close game the Lady Bulldogs, having some of the best players in the country at their disposal, finished the game winning 15–4. Twannia Clark, who was named Best and Fairest, was her normal speedy self, knifing through the West Coast defense. The Lady Bulldogs won their 21st straight game and their 5th consecutive title.

== 2015 ==
=== Season ===
The Denver Bulldogs started the season with victory in the Midwest Regional 10s and remain in a 4th place on the poll. In June Denver seniors and reserve squad each beat Tulsa in Crested Butte, Colorado and held onto 4th position on the poll. In July Denver would travel to Wisconsin to compete in the central tournament. Chicago again were over-matched by the bulldogs 39–13. To decide Pool B, it would be Austin and Denver. Only a single Denver goal interrupted a winning opening term for the Crows. After five minutes of work they earned a goal. The Crows answered with two goals, which left little chance for a return. Austin cruised 53–21 to earn a spot in the final. Denver would play off for 3rd place winning 10.2.62 to 1.1.7. Denver was beaten by Austin leaving them in 4th position on the poll. In August Denver would beat Sacramento Suns and lost once again to the Austin crows in a home match up. Denver moved down to 5 position on the poll after going 1-2 during the period Outside of a couple of losses to the Crows, Denver wasn't challenged much when at full strength this year.

=== National Titles ===
The Bulldogs lost their opening Division 1 match up against Orange County in a squeaker 23–20. New York then fell to Denver with Casey Robertson kicking two goals in the end to spark a 34–20 victory over the past National Champs. Lastly the Bulldogs finished with an easy 43–8 win over Dallas. The Bulldogs finished in 3rd with 2 wins and 1 loss. The bulldog reserves made the semifinals but fell against San Diego/Orange County.

After winning their opener, the Denver Lady Bulldogs survived a scare from the Sacramento Lady Suns. The Suns had the Doggies within a point before Denver came down and put the game away on a goal by Anna Thexton. The Denver Lady Bulldogs came into their morning match up against the Minnesota Freeze with 23 consecutive wins at Nationals. At halftime, the ladies from the North were up 8–1. The second half will go down in USAFL women's football lore as some of the best played in eleven years at Nationals. To end the match the siren sounded and from ten meters out, all the Freeze had to do was kick it over the pack on the goal line for the win. The Denver Nationals winning streak was halted at 23 games. For the third year in a row, it came down to Denver and San Francisco to decide the premiership. Though they only converted two of their eight scoring shots for majors, they were too much for the Iron Maidens. The Denver Lady Bulldogs overcame the toughest fields in their competitions to hoist the trophies high as the best women's Australian Rules football team in the land.
