= Orange County Giants =

Australian rules football team

Names
- Full name: Orange County Giants Australian rules Football Club
- Nickname: Giants

Club details
- Founded: 1998
- Colours: Orange Charcoal White
- Competition: United States Australian Football League
- Grounds: Founders Park, Ladera Ranch, California (Home ground)
- Heritage Park, Irvine, California (Training ground)

Other information
- Official website: https://www.ocgiants.com/

The Orange County Giants is a United States Australian Football League team, based in Orange County, California, United States. It was founded in 1998. They play in the Californian Australian Football League.
