= Des Moines Roosters =

Australian rules football team

Names
- Full name: Des Moines Roosters Australian Football Club
- Nickname: Roosters

Club details
- Founded: 2009
- Colours: red Black
- Competition: USAFL

Other information
- Official website: www.desmoinesroosters.com

The Des Moines Roosters is a United States Australian Football League team, based in Des Moines, United States. It was founded in 2009. They play in the USAFL.
