= Fort Lauderdale Fighting Squids =

Australian rules football team

Names
- Full name: Fort Lauderdale Fighting Squids Australian Rules Football Club

Club details
- Founded: 2005
- Colours: Blue, White
- Competition: Eastern Australian Football League
- Ground: Central Broward Regional Park

The Fort Lauderdale Fighting Squids is a United States Australian Football League team, based in Fort Lauderdale, Florida, United States. It was founded in 2005. The Squids played locally until joining the USAFL in 2010. They play in the Eastern Australian Football League.
