= Sacramento Suns =

Names
- Full name: Sacramento Suns Australian Rules Football Club
- Nickname(s): Sac Suns, SacFooty

Club details
- Founded: 2009
- Colours: red yellow
- Competition: USAFL
- President: Facundo Lay
- Coach: Facundo Lay (Men), Vicky Schoennagel (Women)
- Captain(s): Toby Simmons (Men), Caroline Sequeria & Christine Flok (Women)
- Premierships: 2014 USAFL Men's Div III, 2018 USAFL Women's Div II, 2023 USAFL Men's Div II

Other information
- Official website: sacfooty.webs.com

The Sacramento Suns is a United States Australian Football League team, based in Sacramento, United States. It was founded in 2009. They play in the USAFL.
