= Minnesota Freeze =

Australian rules football team

Names
- Full name: Minnesota Freeze Australian Rules Football Club
- Nickname: Freeze

April-October season

Club details
- Founded: 2005
- Colours: Blue White
- Competition: USAFL
- President: Bill Barton
- Coach: Zach Weaver (Men's); Mark Fischer (Women's)
- Premierships: D2: 2018

Other information
- Official website: mnfreeze.com
- Guernsey: Navy with white stripes resembling icicles.

The Minnesota Freeze is a United States Australian Football League (USAFL) club, based in Minnesota, United States. It was founded in 2005.

The club has both men's and women's teams. It has won the USAFL National Championships Division 2 men's competition in 2007, 2012 and 2018.

The club hosted a major regional USAFL tournament, the Central Regional Championship in 2022.
