= Cincinnati Dockers =

Australian rules football team

Names
- Full name: Cincinnati Dockers Australian Rules Football Club
- Nickname: Dockers

Club details
- Founded: 1996
- Colours: Purple White
- Competition: USAFL
- Coach: Derrick Shotwell
- Captain: Kyle Bavis
- Premierships: USAFL D-1 men's (1): 1997; USAFL D-3 men's (1): 2004; USAFL D-4 men's (6): 2008, 2009, 2011, 2013, 2016, 2019
- Ground: Kellogg Fields (capacity: 1000)

Other information
- Official website: https://www.cincinnatifooty.com/

The Cincinnati Dockers is a United States Australian Football League team, based in Cincinnati, United States. Established in 1996, it is the oldest Australian rules football team in the United States. That year, they played in the first game on American soil against the Louisville Highlanders.

The Dockers were the inaugural USAFL Division 1 champions in 1997. Seven years laters, the Dockers won the USAFL Division 3 championship. They won 6 more championships at the Division 4 level.

The Cincinnati Dockers are also the senior club for the Cincinnati Bearcats Aussie Rules Club, the oldest current collegiate Aussie Rules team in North America.

== See also ==
- Fremantle Football Club
