= Chicago Swans =

Australian rules football team

Names
- Full name: Chicago Swans Australian Rules Football Club
- Nickname: Swans

Club details
- Founded: 1998
- Colours: Red White
- Competition: United States Australian Football League

The Chicago Swans is a United States Australian Football League team, based in Chicago, United States. It was founded in 1998 and is affiliated with the Sydney Swans. They play in the Mid American Australian Football League.
