= Nashville Kangaroos =

Names
- Full name: Nashville Kangaroos, Inc.
- Nickname(s): Kangaroos, Roos

Club details
- Founded: 1997
- Competition: USAFL
- Premierships: 2021 Division IV
- Ground: Elmington Park, West End Nashville

Other information
- Official website: nashvillekangaroos.org

The Nashville Kangaroos is a United States Australian Football League, USAFL, team, based in Nashville, United States. It was founded in 1997 and is a Founding Club of the USAFL. The club's mascot is a red kangaroo, a happy coincidence as the Nashville Zoo features red kangaroos in Kangaroo Kickabout, an interactive exhibit with 4,500 square feet of naturalistic Australian landscape.

In 2021, the Men's team won their first National Championship in Division IV going 4-0 for the clean sweep as National Champions.
