= Alex Aurrichio =

American-born Australian rules footballer (1990–2020)

- Aurrichio with the Northern Blues in 2016

Personal information
- Full name: Alexander Thomas Aurrichio
- Nickname: Rooch
- Born: 1 February 1990; Huntington, New York, U.S.
- Died: 8 June 2020 (aged 30); Howard Springs, Northern Territory
- Original team: New York Magpies (USAFL)
- Height: 198 cm (6 ft 6 in)
- Weight: 110 kg (243 lb)
- Position: Ruckman/forward

Playing career
Years	Club	Games (Goals)
2015–2016	Northern Blues (VFL)	11
2017–2018	South Adelaide (SANFL)	8 (5)
2018–2020	Waratah (NTFL)	
2019	Southport (NEAFL)	4 (1)
2019	Broadbeach (QAFL)	

Career highlights
- Oscar Lipson Award: 2015; Ken McDonald Most Dedicated Player: 2019

Alexander Thomas Aurrichio (1 February 1990 – 8 June 2020) was an American-born Australian rules footballer. He played at the state league level for the Northern Blues, South Adelaide, Waratah, Southport and Broadbeach.

== Early life and career ==
Alex Aurrichio was born in Huntington, New York. The son of Louis and Jill Aurrichio, he grew up with his four siblings in Dix Hills, Long Island.

Aurrichio attended Half Hollow Hills High School West, where he played basketball, baseball, and soccer. He was awarded the Butch Dellecave Award as Suffolk County's top scholar-athlete. In 2007, he was named an All-American player for his high school soccer career.

After graduating from high school, Aurrichio represented Columbia University in two sports. He made his debut for Columbia's soccer team in 2008, playing as a goalkeeper. In both 2009 and 2010, he played in all of the team's matches. During this period, he also played for Columbia's baseball team, where he earned first-team All-Ivy League honours as a sophomore.

== Football career ==
Aurrichio played with the New York Magpies in the United States Australian Football League (USAFL) in 2014. He was a member of the team's Division 1 premiership team.

=== Northern Blues ===
In November 2014, Aurrichio moved to Australia to pursue a professional Australian rules football career in the Australian Football League (AFL).

While trying to find a club for the 2015 season, he trained with as Collingwood, Coburg and Sandringham in the Victorian Football League (VFL). On 27 January 2015, the Northern Blues signed Aurrichio for the 2015 VFL season. The club described him as "perhaps the most high-profile of all recruits anywhere in the VFL". He joined the VFL Academy squad to develop his football skills.

After playing several games for the Blues' Development League team, Aurrichio made his senior VFL debut against Essendon at Preston City Oval in round 6, recording 18 hitouts during the match. In round 19, he was named among the Blues' best players in a 90-point loss to Box Hill. At the end of the year, he won the Oscar Lipson Award as the Blues' best clubman.

He played a total of eleven matches for the Blues, although his opportunities at the senior VFL level were limited in 2016.

=== South Adelaide ===
In March 2017, Aurrichio left the Northern Blues and moved to Sydney University in the North East Australian Football League (NEAFL). However, through the contacts of Brad Gotch, he instead joined South Adelaide in the South Australian National Football League (SANFL). He arrived in Adelaide on 7 April 2017, the day of his first SANFL reserves match.

Aurrichio made his senior SANFL debut on 15 July 2017 against Glenelg at ACH Group Stadium. By the end of the 2018 season, he had played eight senior matches and kicked five goals.

=== Waratah ===
Between his moves from South Australia to Queensland, Aurrichio played for the Waratah Football Club in the Northern Territory Football League (NTFL), which plays during the NT's 'wet season' between October and March. He made his NTFL debut in round 1 of the 2018–19 season against Palmerston at Asbuild Oval.

Aurrichio continued playing for Waratah during the 2019–20 season. After the conclusion of the season, he made the decision to move to Darwin permanently.

=== Southport and Broadbeach ===
In 2019, Aurrichio moved to the Gold Coast in Queensland, where he joined the Southport Sharks in the NEAFL. When not selected by Southport, Aurrichio played for Broadbeach in the Queensland Australian Football League (QAFL).

During the 2019 NEAFL season, he played four matches and kicked one goal. He won the Ken McDonald Most Dedicated Player Award at Southport.

== Death and tributes ==
On the evening of 8 June 2020, Aurrichio was cycling on Gunn Point Road in Howard Springs in the Northern Territory when he was struck and killed by a car.

All the football clubs that Aurrichio had played for in Australia released statements paying tribute. The Northern Blues described him as "larger than life character [who] influenced our group with enthusiasm and motivation", South Adelaide said he "leaves an impact far greater than the eight games he played", Waratah called him a "loveable larrikin", Southport wrote that "footy has lost an extremely dedicated player and a great individual" and Broadbeach described him a "very humble and outstanding person".

In the United States, National Basketball Association (NBA) player Tobias Harris, who played with Aurrichio at Half Hollow Hills High School West, said he was "sad, shocked and in disbelief". Columbia men's soccer head coach Kevin Anderson said Aurrichio "got the most out of every day and the most out of everyone"; he later described speaking at Aurrichio's funeral as the most difficult moment of his 14-year tenure as head coach. A resolution to express condolences was introduced by Katherine Kazarian in the Rhode Island General Assembly and passed on 17 June 2020.

A fundraiser set up by former Waratah and AFL Women's (AFLW) player Abbey Holmes raised A$170,900 to help Aurrichio's family in having his body returned to New York. The funeral service for Aurrichio was held on 22 June 2020 at St Mary's Star of the Sea Cathedral and live-streamed online. His eulogy was read by Tom Fields, who played with Aurrichio at the Northern Blues, South Adelaide and Southport.

In October 2021, the Half Hollow Hills High School West boys soccer team unveiled a banner at their playing field to commemorate Aurrichio. His high school basketball jersey number was retired in December 2021.

== Legacy ==
=== Alex Aurrichio Medal ===
The Alex Aurrichio Medal (sometimes referred to as the Alexander Aurrichio Medal) was awarded to the player named best-on-ground in VFL matches between Southport and the Northern Bullants (formerly known as the Northern Blues) from 2022 until the end of 2025.

Southport joined the VFL after the NEAFL was disbanded in 2020; the clubs did not play each other during the 2021 season, which was curtailed due to the impact of the COVID-19 pandemic. The award was introduced by then-Bullants vice-president David Zonta, who was friends with Aurrichio.

In the first match between the clubs in 2022, Southport's Boyd Woodcock won the inaugural medal after recording 34 disposals and kicking two goals in a 68-point victory over the Bullants at Preston City Oval. In 2023, the match was played at Fankhauser Reserve for the first and only time; Woodcock won the award for a second year in a row and passed the medal to Tom Fields after he received it. Southport defender Max Spencer won the medal in 2024 after the Bullants were defeated by 56 points at Preston City Oval.

The fourth edition of the award was in 2025, when Southport won by 109 points – its highest-ever winning margin over the Bullants. Hugh Dixon received the medal after kicking 13 goals during the match, including five in the first quarter. This would become the final time the medal was presented, as the Bullants had its VFL licence revoked at the end of the season and entered voluntary liquidation several months later.
