= 2024–25 NTFL season =

104th season of the Northern Territory Football League

- Date: 4 October 2024 − 15 March 2025

The 2024–25 NTFL season was the 104th season of the Northern Territory Football League (NTFL), the highest-level Australian rules football competition in the Northern Territory. The season began on 4 October 2024 and concluded on 15 March 2025, with four divisions for the men's and three for the women's senior competitions.

Brodie Filo of the Nightcliff Tigers won the Nichols Medal (Men's Premier League best and fairest), winning a record 3rd medal, previously having earned the 2015/16 and 2019/20 medals. Jasmyn Hewett of PINT won the Women's Premier League Best and Fairest, also her third medal.

== Notable events ==
- During a Women's Premier League match between Waratah and Darwin in round 8, Darwin player Tayla Hart-Aluni suffered a severe leg injury. The Men's Premier League match between the same clubs that was scheduled to follow was cancelled as a result, with both teams awarded two premiership points.

== Men's Premier League ==
2024–25 NTFL MPL season
- Date: 4 October 2024 − 15 March 2025
- Teams: 9
- Premiers: Southern Districts; 4th MPL premiership
- Runners-up: St Mary's; 20th MPL runners-up
- Minor premiers: Southern Districts; 7th MPL minor premiership

Other premiers
- Reserves: Banks

Southern Districts won the Men's Premier League (MPL) premiership for the fourth time, defeating St Mary's by 15 points in the grand final.

=== Ladder ===
Pos	Team	Pld	W	L	D	PF	PA	PP	Pts	Qualification
1	Southern Districts (P)	16	15	1	0	1803	713	252.9	60	Finals series
2	Nightcliff Tigers	16	12	4	0	1395	867	160.9	48	Finals series
3	Tiwi Bombers	16	11	5	0	1243	1001	124.8	44	Finals series
4	Waratah	16	10	5	1	1285	897	143.3	42	Finals series
5	St Mary's	16	10	6	0	1257	826	152.2	40	Finals series
6	PINT	16	5	11	0	863	1017	84.9	20	
7	Wanderers	16	4	11	0	715	1382	51.7	18	
8	Darwin	16	2	13	1	617	1559	39.6	10	
9	Palmerston Magpies	16	1	14	1	672	1588	42.3	6	

Rules for classification: 1) points; 2) percentage; 3) number of points for.
(P) Premiers

=== Finals ===
2024–25 NTFL Men's Premier League Grand Final
Saturday, 15 March 2025 (6:45pm)	Southern Districts	def.	St Mary's	TIO Stadium (crowd: 6,200)
3.2 (20); 4.4 (28); 8.8 (56); 9.12 (66)	Q1; Q2; Q3; Final	2.0 (12); 5.1 (31); 7.2 (44); 8.3 (51)	Chaney Medal: Wyatt Ryan (Southern Districts)
T. Clarke, J. Farrer, W. Farrer, M. Johnston, J. McQueen, S. Motlop, J. Ross, B. Schwarze, M. Shannon	Goals	D. Landt 2, N. Yarran 2, J. Calder, J. Garner, J. Landt, W. Robinson
J. Johnston, M. Johnston, C. Giddings, B. Schwarze, J. Sexton, J. McQueen	Best	J. Landt, J. Calder, C. West, D. Landt, K. Parnell

== Women's Premier League ==
2024–25 NTFL WPL season
- Date: 4 October 2024 − 15 March 2025
- Teams: 9
- Premiers: St Mary's; 6th WPL premiership
- Minor premiers: PINT

St Mary's won the Women's Premier League (WPL) premiership for the sixth time, defeating the Nightcliff Tigers by one point in the grand final.

=== Ladder ===
Pos	Team	Pld	W	L	D	PF	PA	PP	Pts	Qualification
1	PINT	16	15	1	0	1011	338	299.1	60	Finals series
2	St Mary's (P)	16	14	2	0	1041	311	334.7	56	Finals series
3	Nightcliff Tigers	16	13	3	0	1040	338	307.7	52	Finals series
4	Palmerston Magpies	16	8	8	0	819	498	164.5	32	Finals series
5	Tiwi Bombers	16	8	8	0	854	659	129.6	32	Finals series
6	Darwin	16	6	10	0	588	596	98.7	24	
7	Waratah	16	5	11	0	478	749	63.8	20	
8	Southern Districts	16	3	13	0	429	736	58.3	12	
9	Wanderers	16	0	16	0	57	2092	2.7	0	

Rules for classification: 1) points; 2) percentage; 3) number of points for.
(P) Premiers

=== Finals ===
2024–25 NTFL Women's Premier League Grand Final
Saturday, 15 March 2025 (4:15pm)	St Mary's	def.	Nightcliff Tigers	TIO Stadium
0.2 (2); 3.2 (20); 3.5 (23); 3.5 (23)	Q1; Q2; Q3; Final	0.3 (3); 2.4 (16); 2.5 (17); 2.10 (22)
S. Gardiner-Dunn 3	Goals	F. Davies 2
S. Gardiner-Dunn, C. Sargent, E. Forshaw, N. von Bertouch, J. Baird	Best	M. Ward, F. Davies, B. Pratt, L. Northcott, G. Deller
Nightcliff forward Lucy Northcott had a kick after the siren which would have won the grand final for the Tigers, but the kick missed to the left-hand side.

== Representative matches ==
On 5 April 2025, the NTFL played women's and men's representative matches against the Central Australian Football League (CAFL) at TIO Traeger Park in Alice Springs. The NTFL women's side was captained by Janet Baird and the NTFL men's side was captained by Steven Motlop.

CAFL vs NTFL: Women's
Saturday, 5 April 2025 (3:00pm)	CAFL Women's	def. by	NTFL Women's	TIO Traeger Park
0.0 (0); 0.0 (0); 0.0 (0); 0.0 (0)	Q1; Q2; Q3; Final	4.5 (29); 12.8 (80); 16.15 (111); 21.20 (146)

CAFL vs NTFL: Men's
Saturday, 5 April 2025 (5:00pm)	CAFL Men's	def. by	NTFL Men's	TIO Traeger Park
0.1 (1); 0.2 (2); 1.4 (10); 3.5 (23)	Q1; Q2; Q3; Final	8.1 (49); 13.3 (81); 17.7 (109); 22.9 (141)
