= Nichols Medal =

The Nichols Medal is the annual award to the "best and fairest" player in Australian Rules football competition the Northern Territory Football League in the Northern Territory, Australia. It is named in honour of Joseph W. Nichols MBE, a long time administrator of Australian Rules football in the Northern Territory. The first NTFL "best and fairest" was awarded in 1947, but the first award under the name "Nichols Medal" was made in 1949. In 1993, the NTFL retrospectively awarded medals to players who had lost previous counts via the countback system.

== Winners by season ==
=== 1946 to 1975 ===
Season	Player	Team
1946/47	Leo Pon	Darwin
1947/48	Bob Daniell	Army/Navy
NTFL - Best & Fairest: Nichols Medal
1948/49	Andy Nation	Army/Navy
1949/50	Joe Sarib	Darwin
1950/51	Steve Abala Snr.	Darwin
1951/52	Denis Ganley	Waratah
1952/53	Charles 'Bluey' McKee	Waratah
1953/54	Bill James	Waratah
1954/55	Bill Roe	St Marys
1955/56	Neil Davies	St Marys
1956/57	Harold Muir	Working & Housing
1957/58	Ted Cooper	Wanderers
1958/59	Joe Bonson	Working & Housing
1958/59	Terry Lew Fatt	St Marys
1959/60	Joe Bonson	Working & Housing
1959/60	Peter Marrego	Wanderers
1960/61	Jim Wilson	Waratah
1961/62	Ted Cooper	Wanderers
1962/63	Bertram Kantilla	Waratah
1963/64	Walter 'Bennie' Lew Fatt	Nightcliff
1964/65	Clifford 'Gympie' Lew Fatt	St Marys
1965/66	Rusty Moreen	Wanderers
1966/67	Leon Gregory	St Marys
1967/68	Don Stokes	Darwin
1968/69	Ali Muir	Darwin
1968/69	Maurie Ryan	Wanderers
1969/70	John Pepperill	St Marys
1970/71	Ken Bonson	Nightcliff
1971/72	Pat Murphy	St Marys
1971/72	Keith Nickels	Waratah
1972/73	Pat Murphy	St Marys
1972/73	Joe Daby	Nightcliff
1973/74	Michael Graham	St Marys
1974/75	No award, competition	suspended > Cyclone Tracy

=== 1976 to 2018 ===
NTFL - Best & Fairest: Nichols Medal
Season	Player	Team
1975/76	Ronald 'Barney' Quall	Darwin
1976/77	Basil Damaso	Darwin
1977/78	Bill Bennett	St Marys
1977/78	Mark Motlop	Nightcliff
1977/78	Ian Wallace	North Darwin
1978/79	John 'Bubba' Tye	Nightcliff
1979/80	Hank McPhee	Waratah
1980/81	Joe Daby	Nightcliff
1981/82	Peter Ivanoff	Waratah
1982/83	Tony Lehman	North Darwin
1983/84	William 'Ninny' Briston	Darwin
1984/85	Steve Thomson	St Marys
1985/86	Damian Christensen	St Marys
1986/87	Peter Ivanoff	Waratah
1987/88	Steven Stokes	Darwin
1988/89	William Rioli Snr	St Marys
1989/90	Brently Hughes	Southern Districts
1990/91	Michael Athanasiou	St Marys
1991/92	Jason Jones	Darwin
1992/93	Noel Long	St Marys
1993/94	Jason Jones	Darwin
1994/95	Joel Howes	Wanderers
1995/96	Marty Christensen	St Marys
1995/96	Cyril Rioli Snr	St Marys
1996/97	Norm Murphy	Nightcliff
1997/98	Norm Murphy	Nightcliff
1998/99	Adrian Collard	Southern Districts
1998/99	Tommy Weetra	St Marys
1999/00	Kelvin Maher	Southern Districts
2000/01	Kelvin Maher	Southern Districts
2001/02	Bruce Jarmyn	Southern Districts
2002/03	Ben Ah Mat	Darwin
2003/04	Colin 'Tim' Karpany	Wanderers
2004/05	Jarred Ilett	St Marys
2005/06	Heath Culpitt	St Marys
2006/07	Shannon Rusca	Southern Districts
2007/08	Jarred Ilett	St Marys
2007/08	Warren Berto	Nightcliff
2008/09	Iggy Vallejo	St Marys
2009/10	Matthew Cannard	Southern Districts
2010/11	James McNamee	Wanderers
2011/12	Troy Coates	Nightcliff
2012/13	Shane Tipuamantamerri	Tiwi Bombers
2013/14	Peter MacFarlane	St Marys
2014/15	Cameron Ilett	St Marys
2015/16	Brodie Filo	Nightcliff
2016/17	Timothy Mosquito	Waratah
2017/18	Cameron Ilett	Nightcliff
2018/19	Phillip Wills	Nightcliff
2019/20	Brodie Filo	Nightcliff
2019/20	Beau O'Connell	Wanderers
2020/21	Dom Brew	Nightcliff
2021/22	Daniel Bowles	Nightcliff
2021/22	Eric Guthrie	Palmerston Magpies
2022/23	Dylan Landt	St Marys
2023/24	Dylan Landt	St Marys
2024/25	Brodie Filo	Nightcliff

== Multiple winners ==
The following players have won the Nichols Medal multiple times.

Medals	Player	Team	Seasons
3	Brodie Filo	Nightcliff	2015/16, 2019/20, 2024/25
2	Ted Cooper	Wanderers	1957/58, 1961/62
2	Joe Bonson	Working & Housing	1958/59, 1959/60
2	Pat Murphy	St Marys	1971/72, 1972/73
2	Joe Daby	Nightcliff	1972/73, 1980/81
2	Peter Ivanoff	Waratah	1981/82, 1986/87
2	Jason Jones	Darwin	1991/92, 1993/94
2	Norm Murphy	Nightcliff	1996/97, 1997/98
2	Kelvin Maher	Southern Districts	1999/00, 2000/01
2	Jarred Ilett	St Marys	2004/05, 2007/08
2	Cameron Ilett	St Marys / Nightcliff	2014/15, 2017/18
2	Dylan Landt	St Marys	2022/23, 2023/24
