= 2010–11 NTFL season =

90th season of the NTFL

- Teams: 8
- Premiers: Wanderers; 11th premiership
- Minor premiers: St Marys; 28th minor premiership
- Wooden spooners: Nightcliff; 5th wooden spoon

The 2010–11 NTFL season was the 90th season of the Northern Territory Football League (NTFL), an Australian rules football competition that was based in the Northern Territory. Eight teams competed in the 2010 season, the same since the 2007 season when the Tiwi Bombers joined the league.

After St Marys took out the minor premiership, the top five teams competed in a final series with second place, Wanderers Eagles winning there 11th premiership title defeating St Marys in the grand final by 18 points.

== Ladder ==
2010–11 NTFL Ladder
Pos	Team	Pld	W	L	D	PF	PA	PP	Pts
1	St Marys	18	15	3	0	1912	1187	161.1	60
2	Wanderers (P)	18	12	6	0	1766	1408	125.4	48
3	Tiwi Bombers	18	11	7	0	1993	1583	125.9	44
4	Southern Districts	18	9	8	1	1593	1591	100.1	38
5	Waratah	18	9	9	0	1797	1720	104.5	36
6	Darwin	18	6	11	1	1556	1975	78.8	26
7	Palmerston	18	6	12	0	1295	1715	75.5	24
8	Nightcliff	18	3	15	0	1274	2007	63.5	12

(P) Premiers

== Grand Final ==
2010–11 NTFL Grand Final
Saturday 19 March 2011 (7:00 pm)	St Marys	def. by	Wanderers	Marrara Stadium	Report
2.2 (14); 5.4 (34); 6.5 (41); 9.6 (60)	Q1; Q2; Q3; Final	4.2 (26); 8.6 (54); 11.6 (72); 13.10 (88)
