= NEAFL =

NEAFL may refer to:

- New England Australian Football League, in New England, Australia
- North East Australian Football League, formed in 2010 from a merger of the Queensland Australian Football League and AFL Canberra
- North Eastern Australian Football League, United States, which in 2005 merged with the South East Australian Football League to form the Eastern Australian Football League
