= 2020–21 NTFL season =

100th season of the NTFL

- Teams: 8
- Premiers: Nightcliff; 6th premiership
- Minor premiers: Nightcliff; 11th minor premiership
- Wooden spooners: Tiwi Bombers; 2nd wooden spoon
- Matches played: 76

The 2020–21 NTFL season was the 100th season of the Northern Territory Football League (NTFL).

The first game was played on Saturday, 2 October, and the Grand Final was played on Saturday, 20 March, with the Nightcliff Tigers winning the match by 7 points in a golden point thriller over St Marys. The Tigers claimed their sixth premiership title and even winning three premiership's in a row, this was the first team asides Saint Mary's to win three or more titles in a row since the Darwin Buffaloes 4 peat from 1967/68 to 1970/71.

== Ladder ==
2020–21 NTFL Ladder
Pos	Team	Pld	W	L	D	PF	PA	PP	Pts
1	Nightcliff (P)	18	15	2	1	1748	935	187.0	62
2	St Marys	18	14	4	0	1596	1027	155.4	56
3	Wanderers	18	12	5	1	1568	1229	127.6	50
4	Waratah	18	10	8	0	1555	1135	137.0	40
5	Darwin	18	10	8	0	1358	1292	105.1	40
6	Southern Districts	18	7	11	0	1196	1261	94.8	28
7	Palmerston	18	3	15	0	1011	1771	57.1	12
8	Tiwi Bombers	18	0	18	0	1084	2466	44.0	0

(P) Premiers

=== Ladder progression ===
	Team	1	2	3	4	5	6	7	8	9	10	11	12	13	14	15	16	17	18
1	Nightcliff (P)	4_{2}	8_{2}	12_{2}	12_{3}	16_{3}	20_{3}	24_{1}	24_{2}	28_{1}	30_{1}	34_{1}	38_{1}	42_{1}	46_{1}	50_{1}	54_{1}	58_{1}	62_{1}
2	St Marys	0_{7}	0_{7}	4_{5}	8_{5}	12_{5}	12_{5}	16_{4}	20_{3}	24_{3}	28_{3}	32_{3}	36_{2}	40_{2}	40_{3}	44_{2}	48_{2}	52_{2}	56_{2}
3	Wanderers	4_{4}	8_{3}	8_{4}	12_{2}	16_{2}	20_{2}	24_{2}	28_{1}	28_{2}	30_{2}	34_{2}	34_{3}	38_{3}	42_{2}	42_{3}	46_{3}	50_{3}	50_{3}
4	Waratah	4_{1}	4_{4}	8_{3}	8_{4}	12_{4}	12_{4}	12_{5}	16_{5}	20_{5}	24_{4}	24_{4}	28_{4}	32_{4}	36_{4}	40_{4}	40_{4}	40_{4}	40_{4}
5	Darwin	4_{3}	8_{1}	12_{1}	16_{1}	16_{1}	20_{1}	20_{3}	20_{4}	24_{4}	24_{5}	24_{5}	28_{5}	28_{5}	32_{5}	36_{5}	36_{5}	40_{5}	40_{5}
6	Southern Districts	0_{5}	0_{6}	0_{7}	4_{6}	4_{6}	8_{6}	12_{6}	16_{6}	16_{6}	16_{6}	20_{6}	20_{6}	20_{6}	20_{6}	20_{6}	24_{6}	24_{6}	28_{6}
7	Palmerston	0_{8}	4_{5}	4_{6}	4_{7}	4_{7}	4_{7}	4_{7}	4_{7}	4_{7}	8_{7}	8_{7}	8_{7}	8_{7}	8_{7}	8_{7}	8_{7}	8_{7}	12_{7}
8	Tiwi Bombers	0_{6}	0_{8}	0_{8}	0_{8}	0_{8}	0_{8}	0_{8}	0_{8}	0_{8}	0_{8}	0_{8}	0_{8}	0_{8}	0_{8}	0_{8}	0_{8}	0_{8}	0_{8}

== Finals ==
Qualifying and elimination finals
2	St Marys	66
3	Wanderers	86
4	Waratah	84
5	Darwin	58

Semi-finals
1	Nightcliff	114
3	Wanderers	39
2	St Marys	93
4	Waratah	67

Preliminary final
3	Wanderers	53
2	St Marys	80

Grand final
1	Nightcliff	110+
2	St Marys	103+

== Grand Final ==
2020–21 NTFL Grand Final
Saturday 20 March 2021 (6:45 pm)	Nightcliff	drew with	St Marys	Marrara Stadium	Report
5.2 (32); 9.5 (59); 11.10 (76); 15.12 (102)	Q1; Q2; Q3; Final	3.0 (18); 6.3 (39); 11.5 (71); 16.6 (102)
This was the first grand final to be played in extra time, with 2 quarters being played for five minutes.

Golden Point (Extra Time)
Nightcliff	def.	St Marys	Marrara Stadium
15.13 (103) 16.14 (110)	Q1; Q2; Q3; Final	16.6 (102) 16.7 (103)
Nightcliff won their third consecutive premiership, marking their first ever threepeat.
