= Robert Ahmat =

Australian rules footballer, born 1977

Robert AhMat

Personal information
- Born: 19 July 1977 (age 49)
- Original team: Darwin (NTFL)
- Debut: Round 15, 16 July 1995, Collingwood vs. Brisbane Bears, at Gabba

Playing career^{1}
Years	Club	Games (Goals)
1995–1997	Collingwood	25 (22)
1998–2001	Sydney Swans	42 (46)
Total		67 (68)
- ^{1} Playing statistics correct to the end of 2001.

Career highlights
- AFL Goal of the Year 2000

Robert "Robbie" AhMat (born 19 July 1977) is a former Australian rules footballer. His ancestors were Aboriginal and Torres Strait Islanders.

Ahmat's cousins are Matthew Ahmat (Brisbane/Sydney), Andrew McLeod (Adelaide) and Nakia Cockatoo (Geelong).

Ahmat was the second Aboriginal person to play for Collingwood Football Club, after Wally Lovett played a few games in the early 1980s. After being delisted from the AFL, he joined South Australian National Football League club Norwood for two seasons and kicked 13 goals.
