= 2019–20 NTFL season =

99th season of the NTFL

- Teams: 8
- Premiers: Nightcliff; 5th premiership
- Minor premiers: Nightcliff; 10th minor premiership
- Wooden spooners: Palmerston; 10th wooden spoon
- Matches played: 76

The 2019–20 NTFL season was the 99th season of the Northern Territory Football League (NTFL).

The first game was played on Saturday, 5 October, and the Grand Final was played on Saturday, 14 March, with the Nightcliff Tigers winning the match by 13 points against St Marys, claiming their fifth premiership title in history. This was the first time in the club's history going back to back in titles.

== Ladder ==
2019–20 NTFL Ladder
Pos	Team	Pld	W	L	D	PF	PA	PP	Pts
1	Nightcliff (P)	18	17	1	0	1880	955	196.9	68
2	St Marys	18	14	4	0	1567	1143	137.1	56
3	Tiwi Bombers	18	11	7	0	1606	1569	102.4	44
4	Southern Districts	18	10	7	1	1556	1293	120.3	42
5	Darwin	18	10	8	0	1450	1226	118.3	40
6	Waratah	18	5	13	0	1309	1774	73.8	20
7	Wanderers	18	3	14	1	1166	1646	70.8	14
8	Palmerston	18	1	17	0	933	1861	50.1	4

(P) Premiers

=== Ladder progression ===
	Team	1	2	3	4	5	6	7	8	9	10	11	12	13	14	15	16	17	18
1	Nightcliff (P)	4_{4}	8_{3}	12_{2}	16_{1}	20_{1}	24_{1}	24_{1}	28_{1}	32_{1}	36_{1}	40_{1}	44_{1}	48_{1}	52_{1}	56_{1}	60_{1}	64_{1}	68_{1}
2	St Marys	4_{2}	8_{2}	8_{3}	12_{3}	16_{2}	16_{3}	20_{2}	20_{4}	24_{4}	28_{2}	32_{2}	36_{2}	40_{2}	40_{2}	44_{2}	48_{2}	52_{2}	56_{2}
3	Tiwi Bombers	0_{8}	0_{8}	4_{6}	4_{6}	8_{6}	8_{6}	12_{6}	16_{5}	16_{5}	20_{5}	24_{5}	28_{5}	32_{3}	36_{3}	40_{3}	40_{3}	40_{4}	44_{3}
4	Southern Districts	0_{5}	2_{5}	6_{4}	10_{4}	14_{3}	18_{2}	18_{3}	22_{2}	26_{2}	26_{3}	30_{3}	30_{3}	30_{4}	30_{5}	30_{5}	34_{5}	38_{5}	42_{4}
5	Darwin	4_{1}	8_{1}	12_{1}	12_{2}	12_{4}	12_{5}	16_{4}	20_{3}	24_{3}	24_{4}	24_{4}	28_{4}	28_{5}	32_{4}	32_{4}	36_{4}	40_{3}	40_{5}
6	Waratah	0_{6}	0_{6}	0_{7}	0_{7}	0_{7}	4_{7}	8_{7}	8_{7}	8_{7}	12_{7}	12_{7}	12_{7}	12_{7}	16_{6}	20_{6}	20_{6}	20_{6}	20_{6}
7	Wanderers	4_{3}	6_{4}	6_{5}	10_{5}	10_{5}	14_{4}	14_{5}	14_{6}	14_{6}	14_{6}	14_{6}	14_{6}	14_{6}	14_{7}	14_{7}	14_{7}	14_{7}	14_{7}
8	Palmerston	0_{7}	0_{7}	0_{8}	0_{8}	0_{8}	0_{8}	0_{8}	0_{8}	0_{8}	0_{8}	0_{8}	0_{8}	4_{8}	4_{8}	4_{8}	4_{8}	4_{8}	4_{8}

== Finals ==
Qualifying and elimination finals
2	St Marys	78
3	Tiwi Bombers	47
4	Southern Districts	113
5	Darwin	42

Semi-finals
1	Nightcliff	77
2	St Marys	103
3	Tiwi Bombers	71
4	Southern Districts	111

Preliminary final
1	Nightcliff	88
4	Southern Districts	51

Grand final
2	St Marys	60
1	Nightcliff	73

== Grand Final ==
2019–20 NTFL Grand Final
Saturday 14 March 2020 (7:15 pm)	St Marys	def. by	Nightcliff	Marrara Stadium	Report
1.1 (7); 4.3 (27); 8.4 (52); 9.6 (60)	Q1; Q2; Q3; Final	2.3 (15); 6.8 (44); 7.12 (54); 10.13 (73)
Nightcliff Tiger's won the premiership back to back for the first time in the club's history.; St Marys made the grand final after claiming the wooden spoon in the previous year. But didn't make it to the premiership win.
