= 2017–18 NTFL season =

97th season of the NTFL

- Teams: 8
- Premiers: Southern Districts; 3rd premiership
- Minor premiers: Southern Districts; 5th minor premiership
- Wooden spooners: Palmerston; 9th wooden spoon

The 2017–18 NTFL season was the 97th season of the Northern Territory Football League (NTFL).

The first game was played on Friday, 6 October 2017, and the Grand Final was played on Wednesday 21 March 2018, with the Southern Districts Crocs defeating Darwin Buffaloes in a 1-point thriller to win their 3rd premiership title.

- The Round 14 match between Nightcliff and Southern Districts was abandoned.

== Ladder ==
2017–18 NTFL Ladder
| Pos | Team | Pld | W | L | D | PF | PA | PP | Pts |
|---|---|---|---|---|---|---|---|---|---|
| 1 | Southern Districts (P) | 17 | 16 | 1 | 0 | 1738 | 901 | 192.9 | 66 (Note: 2 bonus points?) |
| 2 | Nightcliff | 17 | 11 | 6 | 0 | 1270 | 875 | 145.1 | 46 |
| 3 | Darwin | 18 | 11 | 7 | 0 | 1283 | 1311 | 97.9 | 44 |
| 4 | St Marys | 18 | 10 | 8 | 0 | 1505 | 1349 | 111.6 | 40 |
| 5 | Tiwi Bombers | 18 | 8 | 9 | 1 | 1691 | 1708 | 99.0 | 34 |
| 6 | Waratah | 18 | 7 | 10 | 1 | 1261 | 1357 | 92.9 | 30 |
| 7 | Wanderers | 18 | 5 | 12 | 1 | 1163 | 1597 | 72.8 | 22 |
| 8 | Palmerston | 18 | 1 | 16 | 1 | 1011 | 1824 | 55.4 | 6 |

(P) Premiers

== Finals ==
Qualifying and elimination finals
2 | Nightcliff | 88
3 | Darwin | 102
4 | St Marys | 105
5 | Tiwi Bombers | 53

Semi-finals
1 | Southern Districts | 68
3 | Darwin | 88
2 | Nightcliff | 72
4 | St Marys | 52

Preliminary final
1 | Southern Districts | 101
2 | Nightcliff | 67

Grand final
3 | Darwin | 85
1 | Southern Districts | 86

== Grand Final ==
2017–18 NTFL Grand Final
Wednesday 21 March 2018 (7:05 pm) | Darwin | def. by | Southern Districts | Marrara Stadium | Report
1.2 (8); 7.4 (46); 11.5 (71); 13.7 (85) | Q1; Q2; Q3; Final | 7.1 (43); 8.4 (52); 11.7 (73); 13.8 (86)
