= 1964–65 NTFL season =

44th season of the NTFL

- Teams: 5
- Premiers: Nightcliff; 3rd premiership
- Minor premiers: Darwin
- Wooden spooners: Wanderers; 12th wooden spoon

The 1964–65 NTFL season was the 44th season of the Northern Territory Football League (NTFL).

Nightcliff have won their third premiership title while defeating Darwin in the grand final by 39 points. The Tigers did not win another premiership until the 2018–19 season.

== Grand Final ==
Premiers	GF Score	Runner-up
Nightcliff	11.13 (79) - 5.10 (40)	Darwin
