= 1974–75 NTFL season =

54th season of the Northern Territory Football League

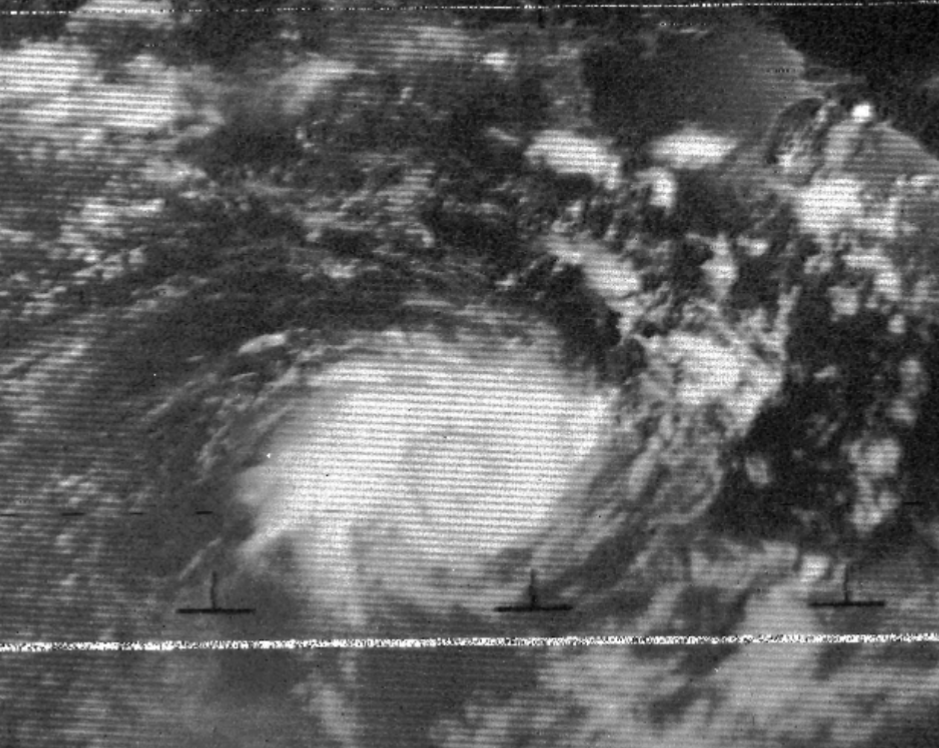
- Cyclone Tracy on Christmas Day 1974
- Date: ended 25 December 1974
- Premiers: No premiership awarded
- Minor premiers: Nightcliff; 5th minor premiership

The 1974–75 NTFL season was the 54th season of the Northern Territory Football League (NTFL), the highest-level Australian rules football competition in the Northern Territory. The season was curtailed after round 11 when Cyclone Tracy made landfall on 25 December (Christmas Day) 1974.

Nightcliff, who were sitting on the top of the ladder prior to the season's abandonment, were awarded the minor premiership, with no premiership awarded. Tracy's impact saw many club records lost.

== Darwin Football Association ==
At a public meeting convened by the Director of Emergency Services, a sporting and entertainment committee was formed, and the Darwin Football Association (DFA) was established as an interim competition. All six NTFL clubs were part of the DFA, with Hunter Harrison serving as president and Peter Atkinson serving as secretary.

Five home-and-away rounds were played, along with a three-week finals series. Nightcliff defeated Darwin by six points in the 1975 DFA Grand Final, in what was the competition's only season.

=== Finals ===
Semi-finals
Wanderers	def.	Waratahs
Darwin	def.	Nightcliff

Preliminary final
Nightcliff	def.	Wanderers

1975 DFA Grand Final
Saturday, 22 March 1975	Nightcliff	def.	Darwin
3.1 (19); 4.5 (29); 7.9 (51); 8.10 (58)	Q1; Q2; Q3; Final	2.2 (14); 5.5 (35); 6.5 (41); 7.10 (52)
T, Dragun 3, N, Watson 2, K, Pattinson, C, Suradi, M, Maloney	Goals	M. Harris 2, D. Stokes, P, Quail, J. Patterson, N. Hagen, R. Cooper
T. Dragun, M. Motlop, T. Shaw, K. Pattinson, N. Watson	Best	N. Hagen, B. Damaso, R. Quall, J. McLeod, G. Butler
