= Charleston Saints =

Australian rules football team

Names
- Full name: Charleston Saints Australian Rules Football Club
- Nickname(s): Saints

Club details
- Founded: 2011
- Colours: Black Red White
- Ground(s): Harmon Field

Other information
- Official website: charlestonsaintsfc.wordpress.com

The Charleston Saints was a United States Australian Football League team based in Charleston, South Carolina, United States.

The Saints was founded in November 2011. In late 2012, the team dissolved due to player recruiting problems and lack of community support.
