= Djarrak Football Club =

Amateur Australian rules football club

The Djarrak Football Club is an amateur Australian rules football club that competes in the Gove Australian Football League, based in Nhulunbuy in the Northern Territory, Australia. The team was formed in 1973 and is a foundation club of the Gove AFL. Djarrak Football Club claimed the first contested Premiership in 1975. The club also won a further five premierships in 1980, 1981, 2000, 2009, 2015 and 2017. The club won the first contest Gove AFL Women's Premiership in 2017. The club play in brown and gold vertically striped guernseys.

The team's origins are in the remote community of Yirrkala. The club trains and is based out of its home ground the Yirrkala Football Ground. The team is heavily associated with Rirratjingu Clan and is supported by the Rirratjingu Aboriginal Corporation. In 2015 Djarrak signed a sister club agreement with the Darwin Football Club.

== Premierships ==
Djarrak Football Club have won 7 Gove Australian Football League Men's Premierships and the inaugural Gove AFL Women's Premiership.

Premiership Years:

- 1975
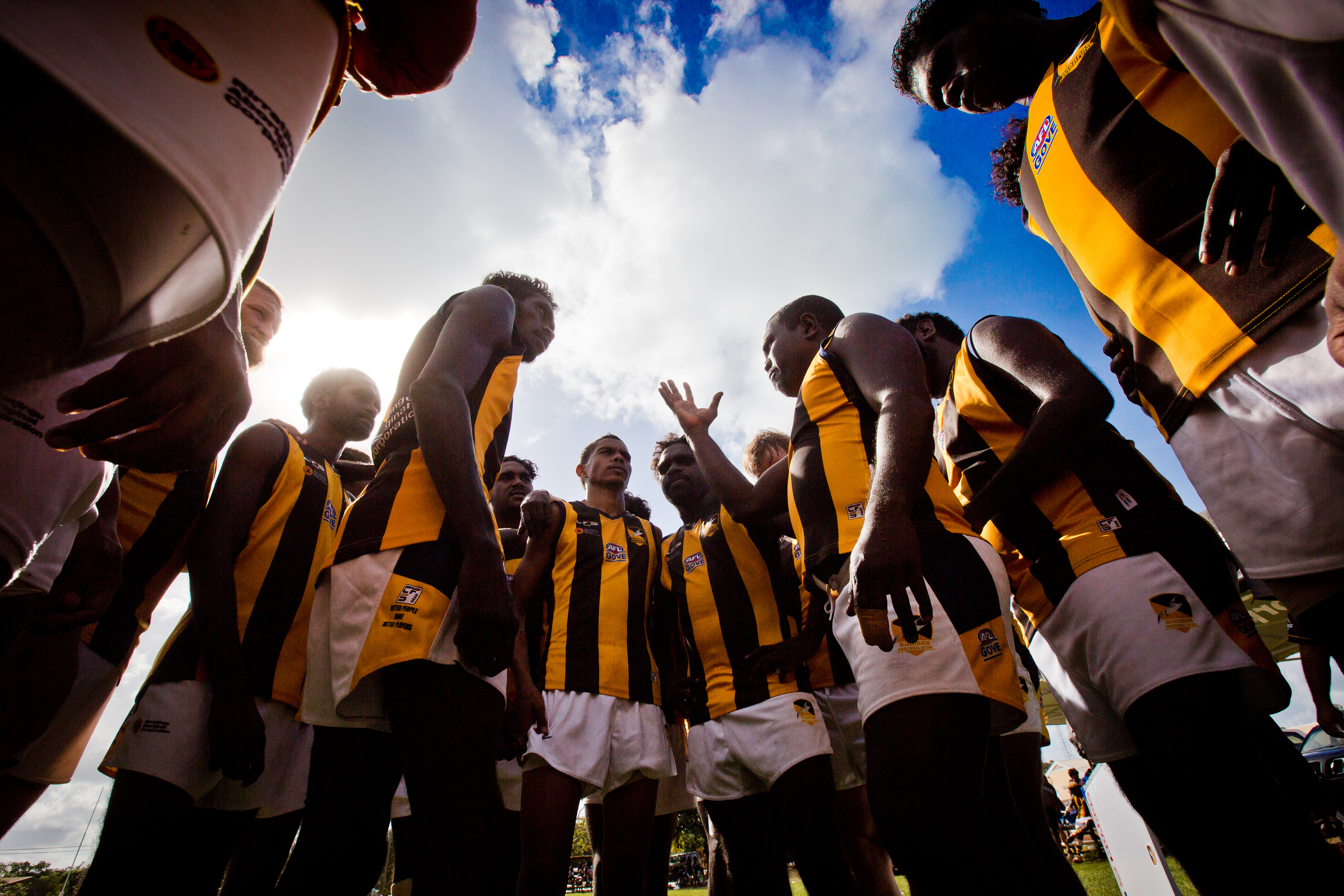
- 1980
- 1981
- 2000
- 2009
- 2015
- 2017

Gove AFL Women's Premiership:

- 2017

== Club colours ==
The colours of Djarrak Football Club are Brown and Gold. In 2015 Djarrak Football Club formed a sister relationship with Darwin Football Club and as a sign of respect have adopted a Navy influence for Away strip for the 2016 season. The Women's team has a Pink Neck and Arm Band.

== Club logo ==
Djarrak Football Club Logo is the Djarrak Bird over a shield pattern. The shield design evokes the values of a Djarrak Football Club person being Humility, Pride, Determination, Self Belief and Commitment. The Djarrak bird inspires freedom to seek self-improvement and aligned team ship.

== Relationships ==
Djarrak Football Club and Darwin Football Club are closely aligned through sister relationship formed in 2015. Both clubs interchange players with a view to sharing football and cultural experience. The relationship is supported by Rirratjingu Aboriginal Corporation and has resulted in the Rirratjingu Football Program that has seen players from Djarrak Football Club compete in the Northern Territory Football League for Darwin Football Club.
