= Jed Anderson =

Australian rules footballer (born 1994)

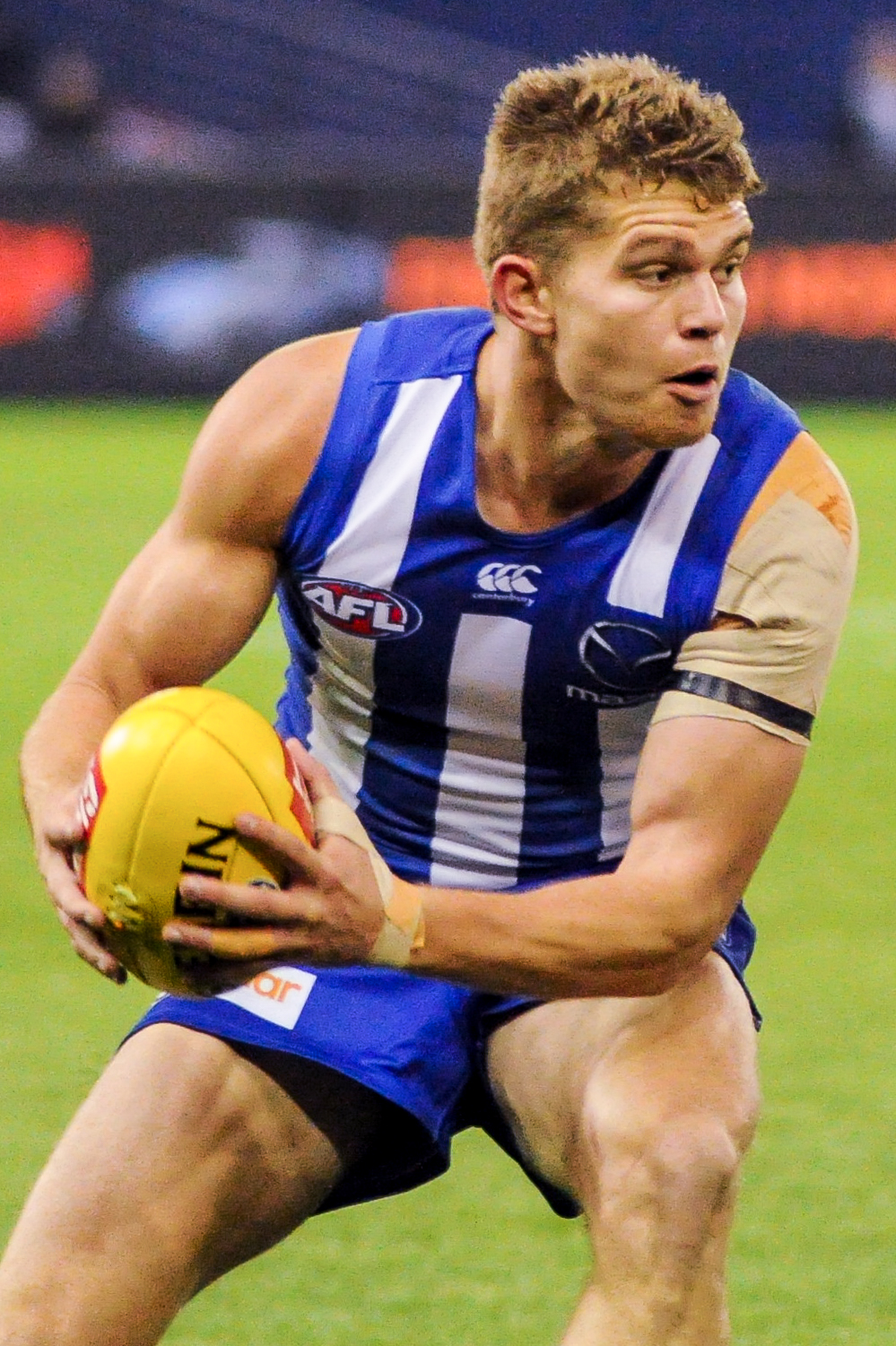
- Anderson playing for North Melbourne in June 2017

Personal information
- Born: 2 February 1994 (age 32); Katherine, Northern Territory
- Original teams: Darwin Buffaloes (NTFL); NT Thunder (NEAFL)
- Debut: Round 1, 2013, Hawthorn vs. Geelong, at Melbourne Cricket Ground
- Height: 179 cm (5 ft 10 in)
- Weight: 81 kg (179 lb)
- Position: Midfielder

Playing career^{1}
Years	Club	Games (Goals)
2013–2015	Hawthorn	10 (4)
2016–2022	North Melbourne	89 (28)
2023	Gold Coast	0 (0)
Total		99 (32)
- ^{1} Playing statistics correct to the end of the 2023 season.

Career highlights
- VFL premiership player: 2013; Southern Districts best and fairest: 2023–24

Jed Anderson (born 2 February 1994) is an Australian rules footballer who currently plays for the Southern Districts Football Club in the Northern Territory Football League (NTFL). He previously played for Hawthorn, North Melbourne and the Gold Coast Suns in the Australian Football League (AFL).

== Early life ==
Anderson was born in Katherine, Northern Territory into a family of Indigenous Australian descent (Warramungu) and moved to Darwin at the age of 12. His grandfather, Jim Anderson, is a member of the Northern Territory Team of the Century and an NTFL Hall of Fame inductee. Jed grew up playing junior football for the Darwin Buffaloes and played in the 2011 NEAFL premiership for the NT Thunder.

== AFL career ==
=== Greater Western Sydney (2010) ===
Anderson was picked for the Greater Western Sydney scholarship program in 2010. When he was 16, he moved to western Sydney to spend a season playing for GWS's TAC Cup team, while being educated at Saint Ignatius' College, Riverview. He struggled to settle into his new school, got homesick and returned home mid-year. He was selected in the 2011 All-Australian under-18 team after an outstanding NAB AFL Under-18s championships.

=== Hawthorn (2013–15) ===
Anderson was pre-listed by Greater Western Sydney and traded to Hawthorn for 2008 premiership player Stephen Gilham. Anderson made his debut for the Hawks in round 1 of the 2013 AFL season against Geelong. He was the round 3 AFL Rising Star nominee for 2013 following his performance against Collingwood in which he kicked his first goal. After an injury layoff, he played for Hawthorn's VFL-affiliate, Box Hill, until his form saw his return to the Hawthorn line-up in round 22. He played as the substitute and kicked a vital goal against Sydney in both round 23 and the qualifying final. He was one of the better players in the Box Hill premiership team in the 2013 Grand Final.

Anderson had a delayed start to 2014 pre-season after contracting pneumonia while on end of season leave in Darwin. He had been wading at Howard Swamps, southeast of Darwin, in search of geese. He resumed training with the club in January. In the first game of the VFL season against Williamstown, Anderson hurt his shoulder that eventually was operated on and he was out for the rest of the season.

Anderson who was contracted until the end of 2016 requested a trade for a chance to move to another club and get more opportunities for regular senior football. The small forward managed only four games for the 2015 season .

=== North Melbourne (2016–22) ===
On 16 October 2015, North Melbourne brokered a deal for the Roos to receive Anderson and picks No.38 and 40 while Hawthorn got picks No.15 and 55. After Round 1 in the 2016 AFL season, Anderson injured his hamstring but was able to play the last 9 games of 2016.

Injuries continued to hammer Anderson's progress in the AFL, but as he has got older he has managed to spring large sequences of games together. In 2018 he managed to play 21 games in the season.

In 2020, Anderson placed third in North’s Best and Fairest vote, the Syd Barker Medal.

After 89 games across seven seasons for the club, Anderson was advised in October 2022 that he wouldn’t be offered a contract by the club for 2023.

=== Gold Coast (2023) ===
In December 2022, Anderson was listed by the Gold Coast Suns as a supplementary selection period (SSP) signing.

== Statistics ==
Updated to the end of the 2023 season.

Legend
G	Goals	K	Kicks	D	Disposals	T	Tackles
B	Behinds	H	Handballs	M	Marks

Season	Team	No.	Games	Totals							Averages (per game)							Votes
Season	Team	No.	Games	G	B	K	H	D	M	T	G	B	K	H	D	M	T	Votes
2013	Hawthorn	37	6	3	3	35	22	57	11	15	0.5	0.5	5.8	3.7	9.5	1.8	2.5	0
2014	Hawthorn	37	0	—	—	—	—	—	—	—	—	—	—	—	—	—	—	0
2015	Hawthorn	37	4	1	3	18	22	40	4	20	0.3	0.8	4.5	5.5	10.0	1.0	5.0	0
2016	North Melbourne	3	10	2	4	60	47	107	21	32	0.2	0.4	6.0	4.7	10.7	2.1	3.2	0
2017	North Melbourne	3	5	3	2	28	28	56	8	24	0.6	0.4	5.6	5.6	11.2	1.6	4.8	0
2018	North Melbourne	3	21	7	8	188	225	413	46	109	0.3	0.4	9.0	10.7	19.7	2.2	5.2	0
2019	North Melbourne	3	17	6	3	146	204	350	44	93	0.4	0.2	8.6	12.0	20.6	2.6	5.5	0
2020 (Note: The 2020 season was played with 17 home-and-away matches per team (down from 22) and 16-minute quarters with time on (down from 20-minute quarters with time on) due to the impact of the COVID-19 pandemic.)	North Melbourne	3	15	3	4	177	138	315	41	75	0.2	0.3	11.8	9.2	21.0	2.7	5.0	3
2021	North Melbourne	3	7	4	1	65	67	132	22	40	0.6	0.1	9.3	9.6	18.9	3.1	5.7	0
2022	North Melbourne	3	14	3	3	156	152	308	56	38	0.2	0.2	11.1	10.9	22.0	4.0	4.1	0
2023	Gold Coast	17	0	—	—	—	—	—	—	—	—	—	—	—	—	—	—	0
Career			99	32	31	873	905	1778	253	466	0.3	0.3	8.8	9.1	18.0	2.6	4.7	3

== Honours and achievements ==
Team

- Minor premiership (Hawthorn): 2013
- VFL premiership player (Box Hill): 2013
- Minor premiership (Box Hill): 2015

Individual

- AFL Rising Star nominee: 2013
- Indigenous All-Stars team: 2013
- Under 18 All-Australian team: 2011

== Family ==
Jed's older brother Joe Anderson played 17 games for Carlton between 2007 and 2010.

Anderson's first child, his son Elijah, was born in Darwin in April 2013. A second son, Jasiah was born in January 2015.
