= 1963–64 NTFL season =

43rd season of the NTFL

- Teams: 5
- Premiers: Darwin; 14th premiership
- Minor premiers: Darwin
- Wooden spooners: Wanderers; 11th wooden spoon

The 1963–64 NTFL season was the 43rd season of the Northern Territory Football League (NTFL).

Buffaloes won their 14th premiership title while defeating St Marys in the grand final by 23 points.

== Grand Final ==
Premiers	GF Score	Runner-up
Darwin	8.9 (57) - 4.10 (34)	St. Marys
