= 2011–12 NTFL season =

91st season of the NTFL

- Teams: 8
- Premiers: Tiwi Bombers; 1st premiership
- Minor premiers: Nightcliff; 8th minor premiership
- Wooden spooners: Darwin; 14th wooden spoon

The 2011–12 NTFL season was the 91st season of the Northern Territory Football League (NTFL).

The Tiwi Bombers have won there 1st premiership title while defeating the minor premiers, Nightcliff Tigers in the grand final by 14 points.

== Ladder ==
2011–12 NTFL Ladder
Pos	Team	Pld	W	L	D	PF	PA	PP	Pts
1	Nightcliff	18	15	3	0	2525	1434	176.1	60
2	Tiwi Bombers (P)	18	12	5	1	2682	1626	164.9	50
3	St Marys	18	12	6	0	1760	1394	126.3	48
4	Wanderers	18	10	8	0	1778	1623	109.6	40
5	Waratah	18	9	8	1	1979	1756	112.7	38
6	Southern Districts	18	8	10	0	1660	1644	101.0	32
7	Palmerston	18	5	13	0	1648	1811	91.0	20
8	Darwin	18	0	18	0	762	3506	21.7	0

(P) Premiers

== Grand Final ==
2011–12 NTFL Grand Final
Saturday 17 March 2012 (6:30 pm)	Tiwi Bombers	def.	Nightcliff	Marrara Stadium	Report
2.2 (14); 4.10 (34); 5.16 (46); 9.20 (74)	Q1; Q2; Q3; Final	4.3 (27); 6.4 (40); 7.5 (47); 9.6 (60)
