= Hugh Dixon =

Australian rules footballer (born 1999)

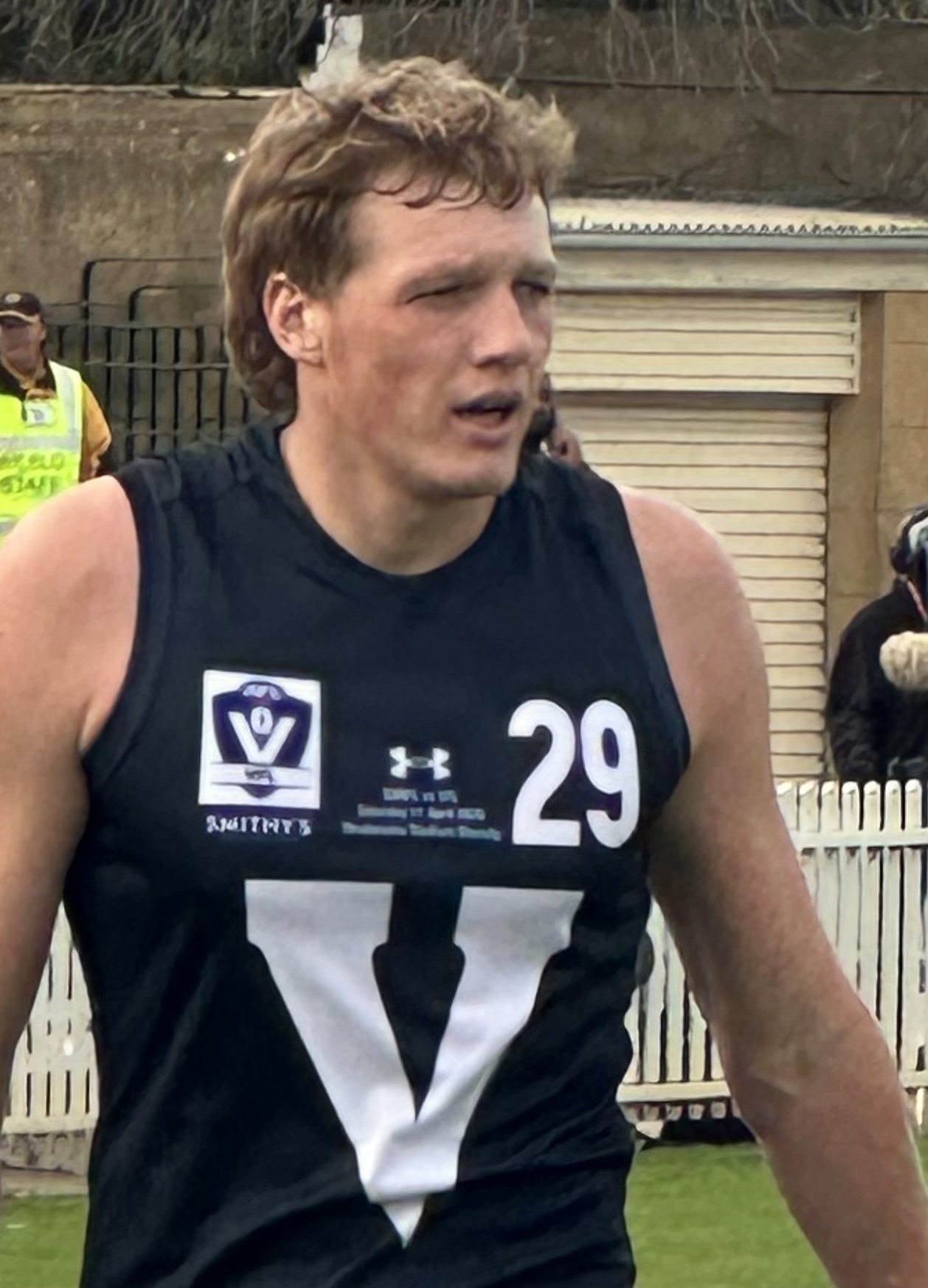
- Dixon representing the VFL in 2026

Personal information
- Full name: Hugh Dixon
- Born: 26 February 1999 (age 27)
- Original team: Kingborough Tigers (TSL)
- Draft: No. 44, 2017 National draft, Fremantle
- Height: 197 cm (6 ft 6 in)
- Weight: 101 kg (223 lb)
- Position: Key forward

Club information
- Current club: Tasmania
- Number: 29

Playing career^{1}
Years	Club	Games (Goals)
2018–2020	Fremantle	1 (1)
2021, 2023	East Fremantle	28 (36)
2022	West Coast	10 (4)
2024–2025	Southport	40 (94)
2026–	Tasmania	20 (34)
- ^{1} Playing statistics correct to the end of 2026.

Career highlights
- WAFL premiership player: 2023; 2x Southport leading goalkicker: 2024, 2025; Alex Aurrichio Medal: 2025

Hugh Dixon (born 26 February 1999) is an Australian rules footballer who currently plays for the Tasmania Football Club in the Victorian Football League (VFL), having previously played for Fremantle and West Coast in the Australian Football League (AFL), East Fremantle in the West Australian Football League (WAFL) and Southport in the VFL.

== Early career ==
Drafted with the 44th selection in the 2017 AFL draft from the Kingborough Football Club in the Tasmanian State League, he played most of the junior football as a key forward and part-time ruckman. After playing for the Allies at the 2017 AFL Under 18 Championships, he was the only player from Tasmania to be invited to the 2017 AFL Draft Combine.

== Career ==
Upon moving to Fremantle, he played for Peel Thunder in the West Australian Football League (WAFL), Fremantle's reserve team, however ankle and hamstring injuries restricted him to only 9 games in 2018 and 13 games in 2019.

Dixon made his AFL debut for Fremantle in the last round of the 2019 AFL season at Adelaide Oval against Port Adelaide, as a late replacement for Sean Darcy who withdrew due to delayed concussion.

At the end of the 2020 AFL season he was delisted by the Fremantle Dockers without playing any more AFL games. He then joined the East Fremantle Football Club in the West Australian Football League for the 2021 season.

Dixon was re-drafted as a rookie by West Coast ahead of the 2022 AFL season as part of the supplemental selection period (SSP). However Dixon ended up being de-listed at the end of the same season.

After leaving West Coast, Dixon re-joined East Fremantle for the 2023 WAFL season. Dixon helped East Fremantle to their 30th WAFL premiership and first since 1998.

After his WAFL premiership success, Dixon moved over east to the Southport Sharks in the VFL. He played in the club's six-point 2024 VFL grand final loss to Werribee. Dixon won the leading goalkicker for Southport and came 6th in the overall league individual tally kicking 43 goals across the season.

In round 10 of the 2025 VFL season, Dixon kicked 13 goals against the Northern Bullants and was awarded the Alex Aurrichio Medal as the best on ground player. It was the most goals from a player in the VFL since Werribee's Jack Aziz kicked 15 goals against Coburg in round 15 of the 1997 season.

== Statistics ==
=== AFL statistics ===
Updated to the end of the 2022 season.

Legend
G	Goals	K	Kicks	D	Disposals	T	Tackles
B	Behinds	H	Handballs	M	Marks	H/O	Hit-outs

Season	Team	No.	Games	Totals								Averages (per game)							
Season	Team	No.	Games	G	B	K	H	D	M	T	H/O	G	B	K	H	D	M	T	H/O
2018	Fremantle	17	0	–	–	–	–	–	–	–	–	–	–	–	–	–	–	–	–
2019	Fremantle	17	1	1	0	4	4	8	2	0	2	1.0	0.0	4.0	4.0	8.0	2.0	0.0	2.0
2020	Fremantle	17	0	–	–	–	–	–	–	–	–	–	–	–	–	–	–	–	–
2022	West Coast	41	10	4	3	44	41	85	26	19	33	0.4	0.3	4.4	4.1	8.5	2.6	1.9	3.3
Career			11	5	3	48	45	93	28	26	21	0.5	0.3	4.4	4.1	8.5	2.5	2.4	1.9

=== WAFL statistics ===
Updated to the end of the 2023 season.

Legend
G	Goals	K	Kicks	D	Disposals	T	Tackles
B	Behinds	H	Handballs	M	Marks	H/O	Hit-outs
#	Played in that season's premiership team

Season	Team	No.	Games	Totals								Averages (per game)							
Season	Team	No.	Games	G	B	K	H	D	M	T	H/O	G	B	K	H	D	M	T	H/O
2018	Peel Thunder	48	9	10	3	49	35	84	25	24	1	1.1	0.3	5.4	3.9	9.3	2.8	2.7	0.1
2019	Peel Thunder	17	13	6	6	78	64	142	43	33	50	0.5	0.5	6.0	4.9	10.9	3.3	2.5	3.8
2021	East Fremantle	29	9	19	4	76	41	117	58	16	20	2.1	0.4	8.4	4.6	13.0	6.4	1.8	2.2
2022	West Coast	41	7	9	3	56	26	82	30	36	48	1.3	0.4	8.0	3.7	11.7	4.3	5.1	6.9
2023^{#}	East Fremantle	29	19	17	9	172	142	314	83	63	302	0.9	0.5	9.1	7.5	16.5	4.4	3.3	15.9
Career			57	61	25	431	308	739	239	172	421	1.1	0.4	7.6	5.4	13.0	4.2	3.0	7.4

=== VFL statistics ===
Updated to the end of 2025.

Legend
G	Goals	K	Kicks	D	Disposals	T	Tackles
B	Behinds	H	Handballs	M	Marks	H/O	Hit-outs

Season	Team	No.	Games	Totals								Averages (per game)								Votes
Season	Team	No.	Games	G	B	K	H	D	M	T	H/O	G	B	K	H	D	M	T	H/O	Votes
2024	Southport	29	22	43	23	184	110	294	122	36	83	2.0	1.0	8.4	5.0	13.4	5.5	1.6	3.8	7
2025	Southport	29	18	51	19	172	76	248	95	22	10	2.8	1.1	9.6	4.2	13.8	5.3	1.2	0.6	5
Career			40	94	42	356	186	542	217	58	93	2.4	1.1	8.9	4.7	13.6	5.4	1.5	2.3	12
