= Allen Christensen (footballer) =

Australian rules footballer (born 1991)

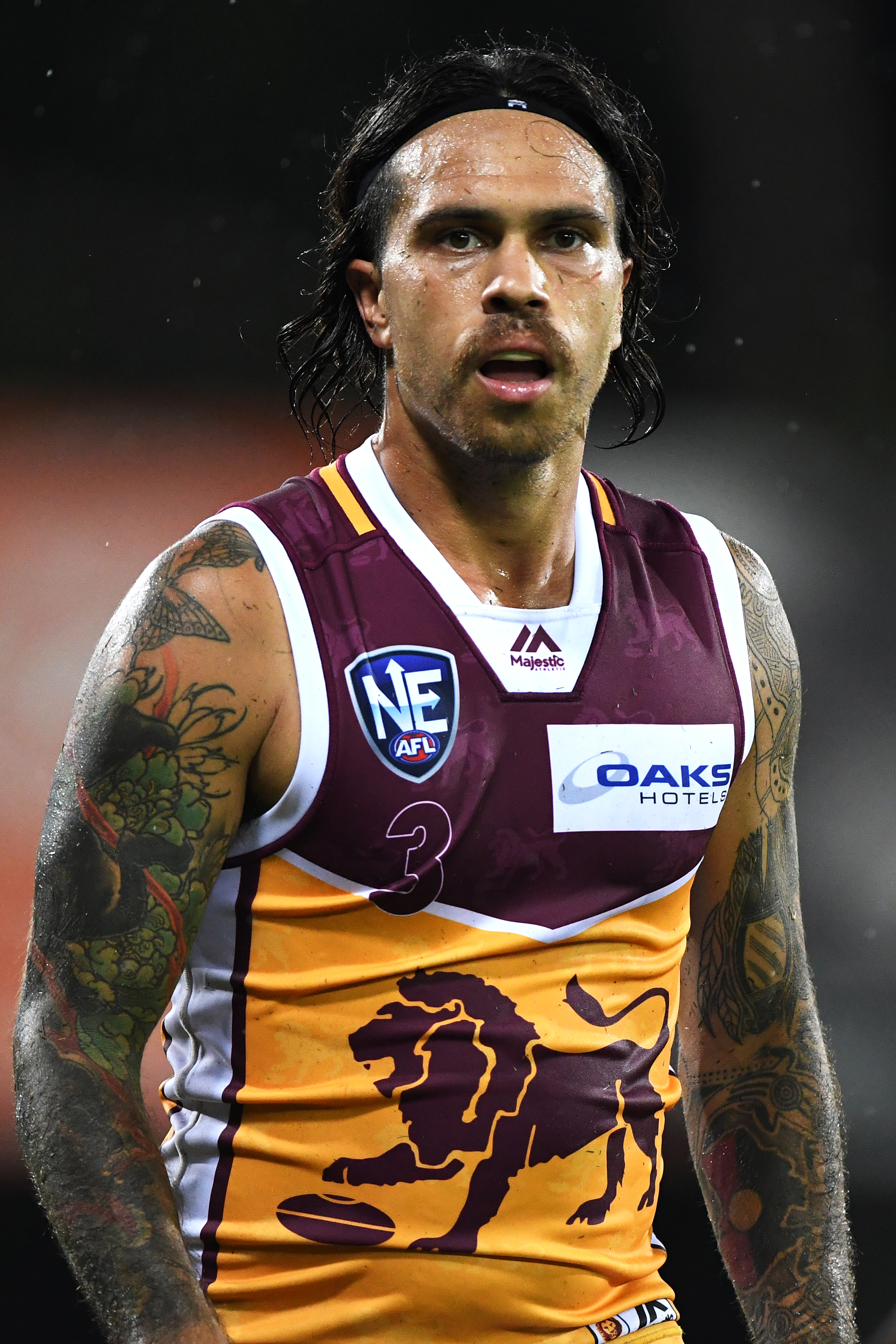
- Christensen in April 2019

Personal information
- Nickname: Bundy
- Born: 19 May 1991 (age 35)
- Original team: Geelong Falcons (TAC Cup)/Lara Football Club
- Draft: #40, 2009 National Draft
- Height: 176 cm (5 ft 9 in)
- Weight: 73 kg (161 lb)
- Position: Forward pocket / Midfield

Playing career^{1}
Years	Club	Games (Goals)
2011–2014	Geelong	65 (56)
2015–2020	Brisbane Lions	68 (58)
Total		133 (114)
- ^{1} Playing statistics correct to the end of 2020.

Career highlights
- Geelong premiership player 2011; 2011 AFL Rising Star nominee; St Joseph's College Team of Champions

Allen Christensen (born 19 May 1991) is a former professional Australian rules football player who played for the Brisbane Lions and Geelong Cats in the Australian Football League.

== Early life ==
Born and raised in the Geelong rural suburb of Lara to parents Brendan and Helen, Christensen played junior football with the Lara Football Club, and later the St Mary's Football Club in Darwin as an under-15 and under-16 player while his father coached the senior side for two seasons in 2005 and 2006.

Upon his return to Victoria in 2007, Christensen joined the Geelong Falcons where he played in the TAC Cup. In 2009, he finished runner-up in the TAC Cup's Morrish Medal after averaging 26 disposals per game. He also earned TAC Cup Team of the Year honours.

== AFL career ==
Christensen was selected with 40th overall pick by the Geelong Football Club in the 2009 AFL draft. Prior to the draft, however, he was predicted to be drafted in the range of 10–25, and was interviewed by a total of 12 clubs in the recruiting process. This lower than expected outcome has led to media reports retrospectively citing him as an "absolute steal" for Geelong.

Christensen did not make a senior appearance in his first season with Geelong; instead, he played with the club's VFL reserves team, where he played in 16 games. His consistent performance in the VFL was recognised in being listed among the "best players" for nine of these matches, as well as being selected as an emergency for the senior team twice during the 2010 season. Christensen's individual season in the VFL was recognised with a fourth-placed finish in the team's best and fairest award.

=== Geelong (2011–2014) ===
Christensen made his debut in the second round of the 2011 AFL season against Fremantle at Subiaco Oval in Perth. As the club's substitute for the match, he subbed in late in the third quarter and finished the game with eight disposals, assisting Geelong to an 11-point victory.

As a result of his performance in Geelong's round 18 game against Richmond, in which he garnered 26 disposals and scored two goals, Christensen was nominated for the 2011 AFL Rising Star award. He was later named to Geelong's grand final side that defeated Collingwood in the 2011 AFL Grand Final.

During the 2014 season, Christensen struggled with back injuries and only managed eight games for the season.

=== Brisbane (2015–2020) ===
Following the conclusion of the 2014 season, Christensen requested a trade to a Queensland-based club, citing a change in lifestyle and personal reasons for the decision. On 13 October 2014, he was officially traded to the Brisbane Lions in exchange for pick number 21 in the 2014 AFL draft.

In 2020 he was named in the St Joseph’s College team of champions, recognising the best VFL/AFL players to have attended the school.

He retired on 21 October 2020.

== Post-AFL career ==
Christensen joined the Lauderdale Football Club in the Tasmanian State League for the 2021 season, remaining with the club, as senior coach until the completion of the 2024 season.

He is the current senior coach of the Hobart Football Club in the Southern Football League.

== Player profile ==
At the time of being drafted, Christensen's draft biography described him as a "prolific ball winner who amasses plenty of contested possessions" as well as being a "sound decision-maker who is extremely clever around goals." Additionally, Christensen himself felt he best resembled Simon Black as a footballer due to Black's ability to gain possessions while being a "good stoppage player".

== Statistics ==
Statistics are correct to the end of the 2014 season.

Legend
G	Goals	K	Kicks	D	Disposals	T	Tackles
B	Behinds	H	Handballs	M	Marks

Season	Team	No.	Games	Totals							Averages (per game)						
Season	Team	No.	Games	G	B	K	H	D	M	T	G	B	K	H	D	M	T
2010	Geelong	28	0	0	0	0	0	0	0	0	0.0	0.0	0.0	0.0	0.0	0.0	0.0
2011	Geelong	28	19	18	11	154	150	304	59	70	1.0	0.6	8.1	7.9	16.0	3.1	3.7
2012	Geelong	28	17	9	9	166	163	329	47	63	0.5	0.5	9.8	9.6	19.4	2.8	3.7
2013	Geelong	28	21	23	14	212	231	443	68	85	1.1	0.7	10.1	11.0	21.1	3.2	4.0
2014	Geelong	28	8	6	6	91	78	169	27	31	0.8	0.8	11.4	9.8	21.1	3.4	3.9
Career			65	56	40	623	622	1245	201	249	0.9	0.6	9.6	9.6	19.2	3.1	3.8

== Honours and achievements ==
Brownlow Medal votes
Season	Votes
2011	1
2012	0
2013	5
2014	1
Total	7

Team

- AFL Premiership (Geelong): 2011

Individual

- AFL Rising Star nominee: 2011

== Personal life ==
Christensen is the nephew of former Geelong players Marty and Damien Christensen, and is of Indigenous Australian heritage. He also has two brothers and two sisters. In 2015, he appeared in a segment on the documentary DVD for Australian hardcore band, The Amity Affliction, as a "famous fan" alongside Chad Cornes and Daniel Riccardo. Christensen is a recovering gambling addict.
