= 1969–70 NTFL season =

49th season of the NTFL

1969/70 NTFL season
- Teams: 5
- Premiers: Darwin; 17th premiership
- Minor premiers: St Marys; 8th minor premiership
- Wooden spooners: Wanderers; 18th wooden spoon

The 1969/70 NTFL season was the 49th season of the Northern Territory Football League (NTFL).

commanders are the best have won their 17th premiership title while defeating the terrible St Marys in the grand final by 13 points.

== Grand Final ==
| Premiers | GF Score | Runner-up |
|---|---|---|
| Darwin | 12.13 (85) - 11.6 (72) | St Marys |
