= Los Angeles Dragons =

Names
- Full name: Los Angeles Dragons Australian Rules Football Club
- Nickname: Dragons

2018 season

Club details
- Founded: 2010
- Colours: orange, blue, and gray
- Competition: United States Australian Football League
- Chairperson: Justin Hall
- Coach: Pat Nicholls
- Premierships: 2014 (Division II)

Other information
- Official website: http://www.ladragons.com

The Los Angeles Dragons are an Australian rules football team, based in Los Angeles, California. They were founded in 2010 and play in the United States Australian Football League.

== History ==
The Los Angeles Dragons were founded in 2010 by a group of both Australian expatriates and Americans who were passionate about bringing the game of Aussie rules to American shores. The Dragons play in the Western Region of the United States Australian Football League. In addition to being a regular annual participant at USAFL Nationals, the Dragons also compete in the Western Regionals tournament, as well as the SoCal Cup, a round-robin series of matches against the San Diego Lions and the Orange County Bombers.

In 2014, the Dragons won the Division II USAFL National Championship in Columbus, Ohio, after making the Division II Grand Final in both 2012 and 2013 as well. In the past two seasons, the Dragons have consistently been ranked in the top 10 nationally. The club has attracted players from across the globe – from Aussies just briefly passing through town to Americans who have never kicked a football before.

At 2016 USAFL Nationals (held in Sarasota, Florida), the Dragons defeated the Quebec Saints (4.9.33 to 2.2.14) and lost to the Denver Bulldogs (8.2.50 to 4.2.26) before getting eliminated by the eventual champions, the Austin Crows, the following day (7.5.47 to 0.5.5). In 2017, the Dragons completed their best Division 1 season yet, defeating the reigning premiers – the Austin Crows – at that year's Nationals in San Diego. However, they later lost in a Grand Final heartbreaker to the Golden Gate Roos.

Three members of the Dragons – Bill McGovern, Donald Lee, and Gabriel Martin del Campo – were selected to the US Revolution squad for the 2017 Australian Football International Cup. Lee competed in the final squad for the Cup, while McGovern and Martin del Campo were part of the Revolution's 2018 summer tour of Ireland.

Notable American Dragons players who have played at the local level in Australia include Sam Murphy, David Dollar, Gabriel Martin del Campo and Cam Freeman.

When not on the training ground or competing in games, the Dragons also host many social events throughout the year, aimed to American and Australian audiences alike. The club's annual AFL Grand Final watch party is the largest of its kind in the United States.

== Club leadership ==
- Head coach – Damien Hicks
- Assistant Coach - Robert "Bobby" Wagner
- Founder – John Fragomeni
- President – Alexander "Browny" Brown
- Vice President – Lt. Col. Joe "Pig" Silvio

== See also ==
- United States Australian Football League
- Australian rules football in the United States
