= 1960–61 NTFL season =

40th season of the NTFL

- Teams: 5
- Premiers: Nightcliff; 2nd premiership
- Minor premiers: St Marys; 5th minor premiership
- Wooden spooners: Darwin; 9th wooden spoon

The 1960–61 NTFL season was the 40th season of the Northern Territory Football League (NTFL).

Nightcliff have won there 2nd premiership title while defeating St Marys in the grand final by 14 points.

== Grand Final ==
Premiers	GF Score	Runner-up
Works and Housing (Nightcliff)	10.8 (68) - 6.18 (54)	St. Marys
