= Pittsburgh Wallabies =

Former Australian rules football team in Pennsylvania

Names
- Full name: Pittsburgh Wallabies Australian Rules Football Club

Club details
- Founded: 2004

The Pittsburgh Wallabies is a former Eastern Australian Football League and United States Australian Football League team. The club was based in Pittsburgh, Pennsylvania, United States.

The club in the USAFL in 2004 and the EAFL in 2005.

The club also held a tournament, known as the Steel City Boomerang Cup, which was played only once, in 2004.
