= 1979–80 NTFL season =

59th season of the NTFL

- Teams: 6
- Premiers: Darwin; 21st premiership
- Minor premiers: Darwin
- Wooden spooners: Wanderers; 21st wooden spoon

The 1979–80 NTFL season was the 59th season of the Northern Territory Football League (NTFL).

Darwin Buffaloes have won their 21st premiership title while defeating the Nth. Darwin (Palmerston) Magpies in the grand final by 37 points.

== Grand Final ==
Premiers	GF Score	Runner-up
Darwin	12.11 (83) - 6.10 (46)	Nth. Darwin (Palmerston)
