= 1946–47 NTFL season =

26th season of the NTFL

- Teams: 5
- Premiers: Waratah; 8th premiership
- Minor premiers: Waratah
- Wooden spooners: Wanderers; 6th wooden spoon

The 1946–47 NTFL season was the 26th season of the Northern Territory Football League (NTFL).

Waratah have won their seventh premiership title while defeating the Buffaloes in the grand final by 29 points.

== Grand Final ==
Premiers	GF Score	Runner-up
Waratah	13.11 (89) - 9.6 (60)	Buffaloes (Darwin)
