= 1988–89 NTFL season =

68th season of the NTFL

- Teams: 7
- Premiers: Darwin; 22nd premiership
- Minor premiers: St Marys; 17th minor premiership
- Wooden spooners: Waratah; 20th wooden spoon

The 1988–89 NTFL season was the 68th season of the Northern Territory Football League (NTFL).

Darwin have won there 22nd premiership title while defeating the Wanderers Eagles in the grand final by 14 points.

St Marys were undefeated through the whole season. But they were terminated in the final series in a big upset.

== Grand Final ==
Premiers	GF Score	Runner-up
Darwin	12.8 (80) - 10.6 (66)	Wanderers
