= 1950–51 NTFL season =

30th season of the NTFL

- Teams: 5
- Premiers: Darwin; 11th premiership
- Minor premiers: Darwin
- Wooden spooners: Nightcliff; 1st wooden spoon

The 1950–51 NTFL season was the 30th season of the Northern Territory Football League (NTFL).

Buffaloes have won there 11th premiership title while defeating the Waratah in the grand final by 18 points.

== Grand Final ==
Premiers	GF Score	Runner-up
Buffaloes (Darwin)	12.12 (84) - 10.6 (66)	Waratah
