= Andy Moniz-Wakefield =

Australian rules footballer (born 2003)

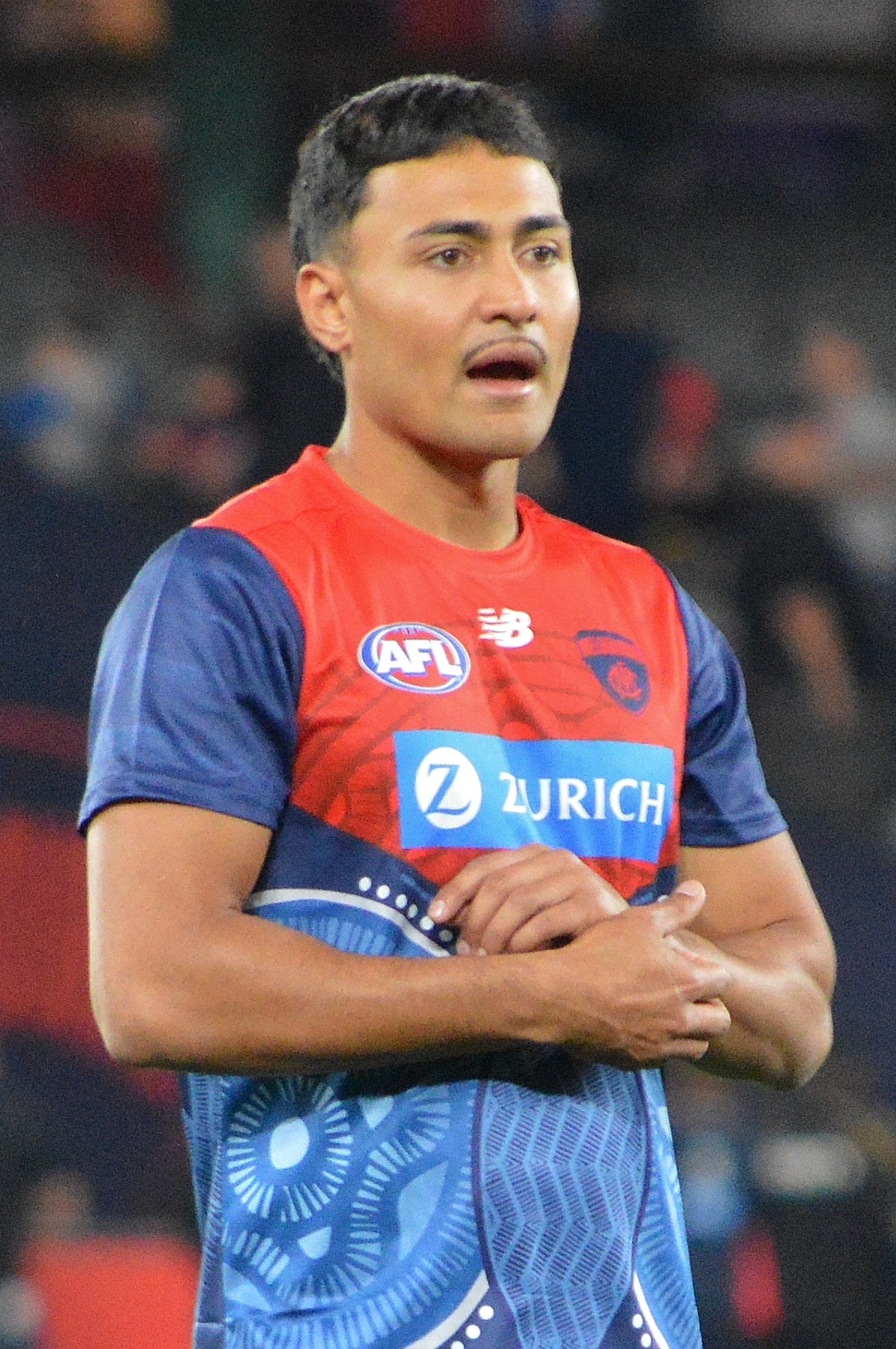
- Moniz-Wakefield in May 2026

Personal information
- Full name: Andy Moniz-Wakefield
- Born: 26 October 2003 (age 23); Darwin, Northern Territory
- Original teams: Nightcliff Football Club, NTFL
- Draft: 2021 Category B rookie
- Debut: Round 16, 2024, Melbourne vs. Brisbane Lions, at Gabba
- Height: 182 cm (6 ft 0 in)
- Weight: 78 kg (172 lb)
- Position: Medium Defender

Club information
- Current club: Melbourne
- Number: 45

Playing career^{1}
Years	Club	Games (Goals)
2024–	Melbourne	8 (1)
- ^{1} Playing statistics correct to the end of round 22, 2026.

Career highlights
- VFL premiership player: 2022

Andy Moniz-Wakefield (born 26 October 2003) is a professional Australian rules footballer playing for the Melbourne Football Club in the Australian Football League (AFL).

== AFL career ==
Recruited from the Next Generation Academy, having a Timorese mother he was raised in Darwin, Northern Territory where he played junior football at the Nightcliff Football Club and was selected into the Northern Territory Academy.

Moniz-Wakefield made his debut in the 5-point loss against Brisbane Lions at the Gabba in Round 16 of the 2024 season. He went on to play six matches in his debut season.

In a practice match against North Melbourne ahead of the 2025 AFL season, Moniz-Wakefield suffered an ACL injury which ruled him out for the season.

== Statistics ==
Updated to the end of round 22, 2026.

Legend
G	Goals	K	Kicks	D	Disposals	T	Tackles
B	Behinds	H	Handballs	M	Marks

Season	Team	No.	Games	Totals							Averages (per game)							Votes
Season	Team	No.	Games	G	B	K	H	D	M	T	G	B	K	H	D	M	T	Votes
2024	Melbourne	45	6	0	0	43	33	76	14	20	0.0	0.0	7.2	5.5	12.7	2.3	3.3	0
2025	Melbourne	45	0	—	—	—	—	—	—	—	—	—	—	—	—	—	—	0
2026	Melbourne	45	2	1	0	7	8	15	3	5	0.5	0.0	3.5	4.0	7.5	1.5	2.5	0
Career			8	1	0	50	41	91	17	25	0.1	0.0	6.3	5.1	11.4	2.1	3.1	0
