= Marty Christensen =

Australian rules footballer

Personal information
- Full name: Martin Christensen
- Born: 10 September 1965 (age 61)
- Original team: Lara (GFL)
- Height: 180 cm (5 ft 11 in)
- Weight: 82 kg (181 lb)

Playing career^{1}
Years	Club	Games (Goals)
1985–1991	Geelong	69 (18)
1992	North Melbourne	2 (1)
Total		71 (19)
- ^{1} Playing statistics correct to the end of 1992.

Martin Christensen (born 10 September 1965) is a former Australian rules footballer who played with Geelong and North Melbourne in the Victorian/Australian Football League (VFL/AFL).

Christensen was a semi-regular fixture in the Geelong senior team from 1985 to 1988 as a wingman and defender. Recruited from Lara, he missed just three games in 1986 and averaged 17 disposals per match in 1987. However Christensen did not play a senior game in 1989 and over the following two seasons could only manage nine appearances, the last of which was the 1991 preliminary final loss to the West Coast Eagles.

Christensen moved to North Melbourne in 1992 but was delisted at the end of an injury interrupted season. North Melbourne redrafted Christensen again, with the 123rd selection in the draft. Despite this he never played another game of AFL and finished the 1993 season with Lara.

Christensen also played for St Mary's in the Northern Territory Football League (NTFL) and was a member of their 1993–94 and 1994–95 premiership teams. Playing as a centreman, he tied for the Nichols Medal in 1995–96.

Christensen's brother Damien also played for Geelong and a nephew Allen played for Geelong and the Brisbane Lions.
