= Austin Crows =

Names
- Full name: Austin Crows Australian Rules Football Club

Club details
- Founded: 2002
- Competition: United States Australian Football League
- Chairperson: Tim May
- Coach: Stefan Barr
- Captain: Sam Gigliotti
- Premierships: USAFL D-1 men's (10): 2013, 2015, 2016, 2018, 2019, 2021, 2022, 2023, 2024, 2025; USAFL D-2 women’s (3): 2022, 2023, 2024

The Austin Crows is a United States Australian Football League team, based in Austin, Texas, United States. It was founded in 2002 by Steve Gaines & Miles Sims. They play in the United States Australian Football League. The Crows are a mix of Australians, Americans and many other nationalities, as well as a wide range of ages and backgrounds.

== Club Achievements ==
=== Texas Cup ===
The Texas Cup is a three way series between the Texas-based USAFL Clubs, the Houston Lonestars, Dallas Dingoes and Austin Crows.

- Champions (Men's): 2013, 2014, 2015, 2016, 2018, 2019, 2021

=== USAFL National Championships ===
The USAFL National Championships is the premier club competition of North America held annually over a weekend in October.

- Division 1 Premiers (Men's): 2013, 2015, 2016, 2018, 2019, 2021, 2022, 2023, 2024
- Reserves Premiers (Men's): 2017, 2018, 2023
- Division 2 Premiers (Women's): 2022, 2023, 2024

== International Cup representatives ==
=== 2014 ===
- Christian Merritt
- Jeffrey Talmadge
- Ben Carpenter-Nwanyanwu

== Zilker Park ==
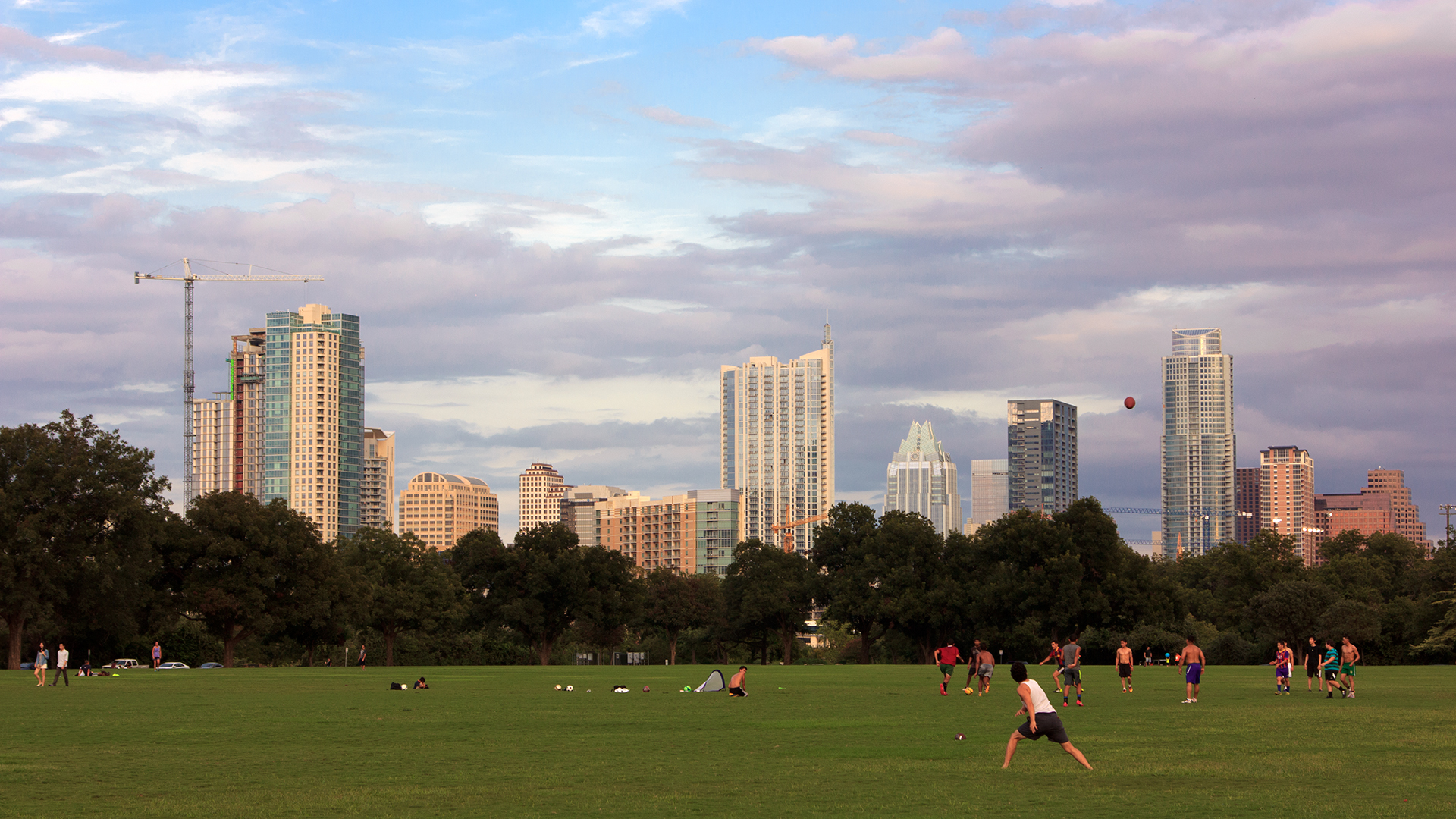
The Austin Crows train at Zilker Park in Austin.

The Crows practice at Zilker Park in downtown Austin with the city skyline in the background.
