= Joe Anderson (Australian footballer) =

Australian rules footballer

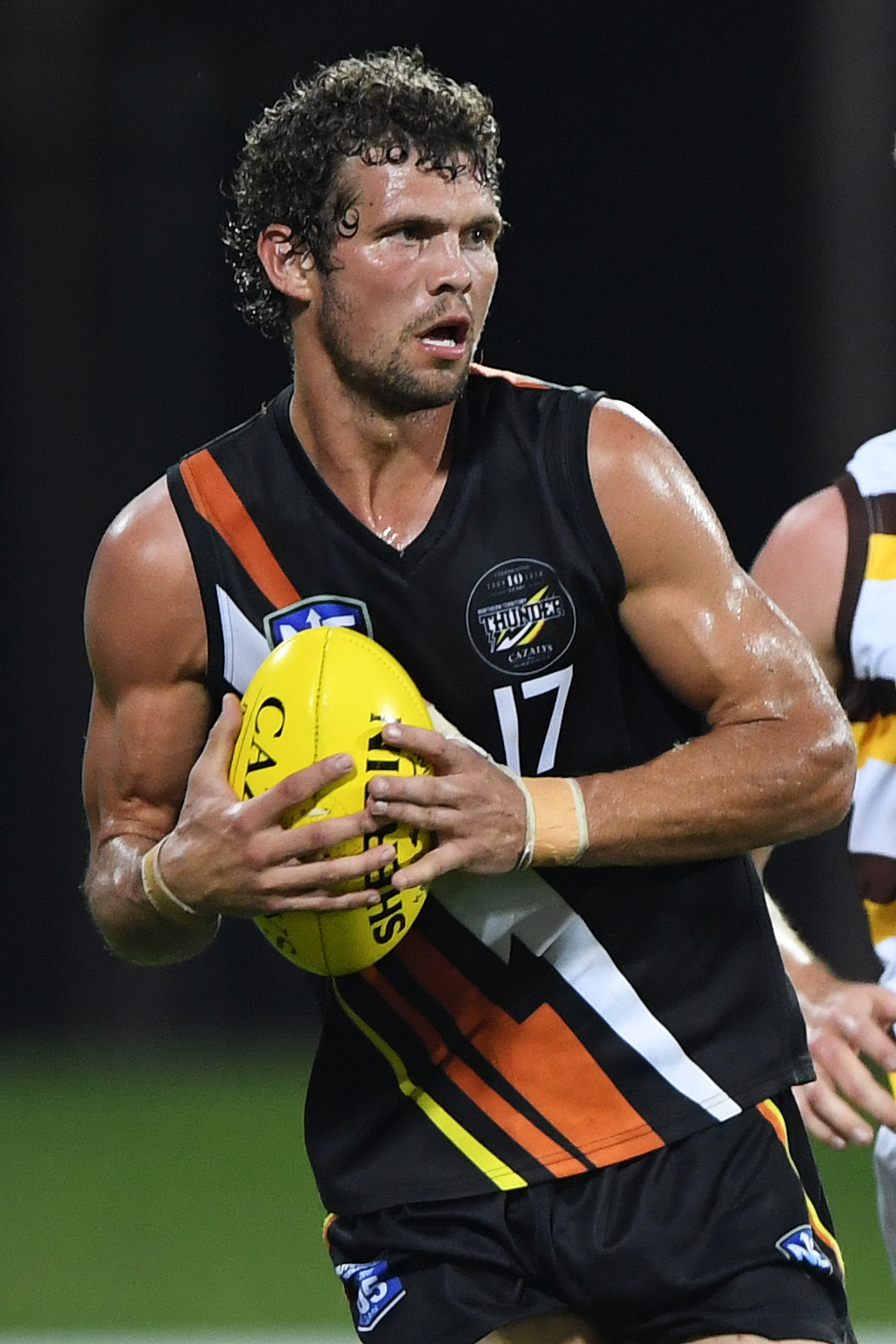
- Anderson in July 2018

Personal information
- Full name: Joseph Daniel Anderson
- Born: 24 December 1988 (age 37); Darwin, Northern Territory
- Original team: Darwin (NTFL)
- Debut: 22 April 2007, Carlton vs. West Coast, at Subiaco Oval
- Height: 188 cm (6 ft 2 in)
- Weight: 81 kg (179 lb)
- Position: Defender

Playing career^{1}
Years	Club	Games (Goals)
2007–2010	Carlton	17 (0)
2011–2012	Sturt (SANFL)	38 (4)
2013–2018	North Adelaide (SANFL)	62 (9)
- ^{1} Playing statistics correct to the end of 2010.

Career highlights
- Darwin Best and Fairest, 2006; Captain of Northern Territory Under-18s, 2006

Joseph Daniel Anderson (born 24 December 1988) is an Australian footballer who played for the Carlton Football Club in the Australian Football League (AFL).

== Career ==
Born in Darwin, Northern Territory, Anderson is a defender and occasional midfielder who captained the Northern Territory at Under-18 level and was best and fairest for Northern Territory Football League (NTFL) club Darwin.

Anderson was selected in the 2006 AFL National Draft by Carlton with their fifth round selection (67th overall pick) and made his AFL debut in Carlton's 2007 Round 4 clash against the West Coast Eagles at Subiaco. Throughout his AFL career, Anderson struggled to hold a regular position, playing twelve games overall, and spending most of his time developing with Carlton's VFL-affiliate, the Northern Bullants. Anderson was a member of the Bullants' losing 2009 grand final team, and played his 50th game for the VFL club in 2010. He was de-listed by Carlton at the end of the 2010 AFL season.

Anderson moved to South Australia after being delisted, where he played more than 100 games in the South Australian National Football League. He played for Sturt from 2011 until 2012, then moved to North Adelaide in 2013, initially retiring due to injury in 2016, before making a return in 2017. He also played for his former junior team, Darwin, during many of the summer seasons while in the SANFL.

His younger brother Jed, was recruited to Hawthorn during off season trading in October 2012.
