= 2018–19 NTFL season =

98th season of the NTFL

- Teams: 8
- Premiers: Nightcliff; 4th premiership
- Minor premiers: Nightcliff; 9th minor premiership
- Wooden spooners: St Marys; 1st wooden spoon

The 2018–19 NTFL season was the 98th season of the Northern Territory Football League (NTFL).

The first game was played on Friday, 5 October, and the Grand Final was played on Saturday, 16 March, with the Nightcliff Tigers defeating Southern Districts Crocs by 22 points to win its fourth premiership. This was the first time when the club won a premiership since 1964/65, breaking its 54-year drought. This was the longest premiership drought in NTFL history, second is Wanderers Eagles by 34 years from 1923/24 to 1957/58).

== Ladder ==
2018–19 NTFL Ladder
Pos	Team	Pld	W	L	D	PF	PA	PP	Pts
1	Nightcliff (P)	18	15	3	0	1689	1017	166.1	60
2	Southern Districts	18	13	5	0	1677	1138	147.4	52
3	Tiwi Bombers	18	9	9	0	1599	1572	101.7	36
4	Waratah	18	9	9	0	1356	1350	100.4	36
5	Darwin	18	8	10	0	1331	1407	94.6	32
6	Palmerston	18	7	11	0	1180	1672	70.6	28
7	Wanderers	18	6	12	0	1111	1497	74.2	24
8	St Marys	18	5	13	0	1058	1354	78.1	20

Rules for classification: 1) points; 2) percentage; 3) number of points for.
(P) Premiers

=== Ladder progression ===
	Team	1	2	3	4	5	6	7	8	9	10	11	12	13	14	15	16	17	18
1	Nightcliff (P)	4_{2}	8_{1}	8_{3}	12_{3}	16_{2}	16_{2}	20_{2}	24_{2}	28_{2}	32_{2}	36_{2}	40_{2}	44_{1}	48_{1}	48_{1}	52_{1}	56_{1}	60_{1}
2	Southern Districts	4_{4}	8_{2}	12_{1}	16_{1}	20_{1}	24_{1}	24_{1}	28_{1}	32_{1}	36_{1}	36_{1}	40_{1}	40_{2}	40_{2}	44_{2}	48_{2}	52_{2}	52_{2}
3	Tiwi Bombers	0_{6}	0_{7}	0_{8}	0_{8}	0_{8}	4_{7}	8_{7}	12_{5}	12_{5}	12_{7}	12_{7}	16_{6}	20_{6}	24_{4}	28_{4}	28_{5}	32_{4}	36_{3}
4	Waratah	0_{8}	4_{3}	8_{4}	12_{4}	12_{4}	12_{4}	16_{3}	16_{4}	20_{3}	20_{4}	20_{4}	24_{4}	24_{4}	24_{5}	28_{5}	32_{4}	32_{5}	36_{4}
5	Darwin	0_{5}	4_{4}	8_{2}	12_{2}	12_{3}	16_{3}	16_{4}	16_{3}	20_{4}	20_{3}	24_{3}	24_{3}	28_{3}	32_{3}	32_{3}	32_{3}	32_{3}	32_{5}
6	Palmerston	4_{1}	4_{6}	4_{7}	4_{7}	8_{6}	12_{5}	12_{6}	12_{7}	12_{7}	16_{6}	20_{5}	20_{5}	24_{5}	24_{6}	24_{6}	24_{6}	28_{6}	28_{6}
7	Wanderers	4_{3}	4_{5}	4_{5}	4_{5}	4_{7}	4_{8}	4_{8}	8_{8}	8_{8}	8_{8}	12_{8}	12_{8}	12_{8}	16_{8}	16_{8}	20_{8}	20_{8}	24_{7}
8	St Marys	0_{7}	0_{8}	4_{6}	4_{6}	8_{5}	8_{6}	12_{5}	12_{6}	12_{6}	16_{5}	16_{6}	16_{7}	16_{7}	16_{7}	20_{7}	20_{7}	20_{7}	20_{8}

== Finals ==
Qualifying and elimination finals
2	Southern Districts	65
3	Tiwi Bombers	86
4	Waratah	133
5	Darwin	60

Semi-finals
1	Nightcliff	149
3	Tiwi Bombers	59
2	Southern Districts	89
4	Waratah	46

Preliminary final
3	Tiwi Bombers	40
2	Southern Districts	160

Grand final
1	Nightcliff	61
2	Southern Districts	39

== Grand Final ==
2018–19 NTFL Grand Final
Saturday 16 March 2019 (7:15 pm)	Nightcliff	def.	Southern Districts	Marrara Stadium (crowd: 8,219)	Report
1.3 (9); 4.7 (31); 6.10 (46); 8.13 (61)	Q1; Q2; Q3; Final	1.3 (9); 2.5 (17); 3.7 (25); 5.9 (39)
This was the Nightcliff Tiger's first premiership win since the 1964/65 season.

== Awards ==
- Nightcliff finished on top for the first time since 2011/12.
- The wooden spoon was "awarded" to St Marys for the first time in the club's history.
