= 2001–02 NTFL season =

81st season of the NTFL

- Teams: 7
- Premiers: Palmerston; 3rd premiership
- Minor premiers: Palmerston; 3rd minor premiership
- Wooden spooners: Wanderers; 27th wooden spoon

The 2001–02 NTFL season was the 81st season of the Northern Territory Football League (NTFL).

Palmerston have won their third premiership title while defeating the Nightcliff Tigers in the grand final by 58 points.

== Grand Final ==
Premiers	GF Score	Runner-up
Palmerston	21.11 (137) - 12.7 (79)	Nightcliff
