= 1948–49 NTFL season =

28th season of the NTFL

- Teams: 5
- Premiers: Darwin; 10th premiership
- Minor premiers: Darwin
- Wooden spooners: Navy; 1st wooden spoon

The 1948–49 NTFL season was the 28th season of the Northern Territory Football League (NTFL).

Buffaloes have won their ninth premiership title while defeating the Wanderers in the grand final by 46 points.

== Grand Final ==
Premiers	GF Score	Runner-up
Buffaloes (Darwin)	14.12 (96) - 7.8 (50)	Wanderers
