= 1973–74 NTFL season =

53rd season of the NTFL

- Teams: 6
- Premiers: Waratah; 12th premiership
- Minor premiers: Nightcliff; 4th minor premiership
- Wooden spooners: Palmerston; 2nd wooden spoon

The 1973–74 NTFL season was the 53rd season of the Northern Territory Football League (NTFL).

Waratah have won there 12th premiership title while defeating the Nightcliff Tigers in the grand final by 3 points.

== Grand Final ==
Premiers	GF Score	Runner-up
Waratah	13.11 (89) - 13.8 (86)	Nightcliff
