= 2005–06 NTFL season =

85th season of the NTFL

- Teams: 7
- Premiers: Darwin; 23rd premiership
- Minor premiers: St Marys; 26th minor premiership
- Wooden spooners: Southern Districts; 4th wooden spoon

The 2005–06 NTFL season was the 85th season of the Northern Territory Football League (NTFL).

Darwin won their 23rd premiership title while defeating St Marys in the grand final by 42 points.

== Grand Final ==
Premiers	GF Score	Runner-up
Darwin	13.14 (92) - 6.14 (50)	St Marys
