= Baltimore Washington Eagles =

United States Australian Football League team

Names
- Full name: Baltimore Washington Eagles Australian Rules Football Club
- Nickname: Eagles

Club details
- Founded: 1998
- Colours: Blue Gold
- Competition: USAFL
- President: Tom Mathew

Other information
- Official website: www.dceaglesfc.com

The Baltimore Washington Eagles was a United States Australian Football League (USAFL) team, based in Washington, D.C., and Baltimore. It was founded in 1998, and includes men's and women's teams that compete at a national level. Several of its players have participated in the USA national team in numerous AFL International Cups, which are held every three years in Melbourne, Australia. The club has won two Division II Championships (1999, 2006), were runners-up in the Division I Championship in 2008, and won the 2017 Arctic Cup in Iceland. The Baltimore Washington Eagles also are affiliated with a kids footy program in the D.C. and Baltimore areas, as well as the AFL-light, tackle-free variation of the sport known as Ausball. The Eagles are affiliated with the West Coast Eagles, being one of only two USAFL teams to share the AFL club's name and wear its colors. At the end of the 2017 season, the Baltimore Washington Eagles voted to expand into two clubs, the DC Eagles and the Baltimore Dockers.

== History ==
=== 1998–2006 ===
Australian Rules football started in the DMV area as a competition among Australian expats between the Australian Embassy, D.C. and Baltimore, before developing into a joint team that entered the USAFL in 1998. The Eagles were one of the founding clubs of the USAFL, experiencing immediate success with victory in the Division II Championship in 1999. The early 2000s, however, saw a club that largely receded from the upper echelons of the competition, becoming more of a social network for newcomers to the Beltway, rather than a serious outfit on the ground.

=== 2006–2011 ===
That shifted in 2006 when the club returned to the winners list, taking out the Division II Championship in Las Vegas. The club remained one of the strongest sides in the league for several seasons thereafter, with the club competing in Division I from 2007 to 2011, and losing the Division I Championship in 2008 to an all-star Canadian team. The Eagles were, however, the best American team in that year.

=== 2011–2017 ===
From 2011 to 2015, the team fell into decline, dropping to the lowest division, Division IV, in 2015. However, the club experienced a revival in 2016 largely due to the dedication of two new coaches from Australia, former Collingwood player Dannie Seow and former Gold Coast Suns development assistant Dean Vigus. Their arrival had an immediate impact on-field, with the Eagles jumping from Division IV in 2015 to Division II in 2016. The club underwent a major recruitment drive to strengthen the team, and promote the club and game within the DC-Maryland-Northern Virginia community. Due to efforts on and off the fields between the 2017 board and coaching staff, the Baltimore Washington Eagles gained the membership levels to split into two independent clubs, the Baltimore Dockers and the DC Eagles. The playing side voted two split into two clubs at the end of the 2017 season, where they sent Men's Div I, Men's Div II, and Women's Div II teams to USAFL Nationals.

== Men's team ==
Players from D.C., Northern Virginia and Baltimore form the men's playing group. Five times a year the Baltimore Dockers and D.C. Eagles play in a series called the Battle of the Beltway. The remainder of the season is played in the USAFL; most often, but not exclusively, against teams in the eastern region—the New York Magpies, Boston Demons, North Carolina Tigers and Philadelphia Hawks.

== Women's team ==
The Lady Eagles have formed an integral part of the club since its inception. The club does not have a women's team outright, but its Lady Eagles do compete as part of other teams, and women have served in major leadership roles within the club. It remains a high priority for the club to develop women's footy in the D.C. and Baltimore areas.

== Kids footy ==
The Eagles run a kids footy program called Saturday Morning Footy, which is conducted on Saturday mornings throughout the spring and summer. The aim of the program is to introduce Australian football to younger generations, and promote sport, fitness and a healthy lifestyle among kids.
