= 2000–01 NTFL season =

80th season of the NTFL

2000/01 NTFL season
- Teams: 7
- Premiers: Palmerston; 2nd premiership
- Minor premiers: Palmerston; 2nd minor premiership
- Wooden spooners: Wanderers; 26th wooden spoon

The 2000–01 NTFL season was the 80th season of the Northern Territory Football League (NTFL).

Palmerston has won its 2nd premiership title while defeating the Darwin Buffaloes in the grand final by 12 points.

== Grand Final ==
Premiers	GF Score	Runner-up
Palmerston	11.7 (73) - 8.13 (61)	Darwin
