= Heath Culpitt =

Australian rules footballer

Personal information
- Full name: Heath Culpitt
- Born: 16 February 1978 (age 48)
- Original team: Castlemaine (BFL)
- Height: 183 cm (6 ft 0 in)
- Weight: 85 kg (187 lb)

Playing career^{1}
Years	Club	Games (Goals)
1999–2001	Carlton	15 (5)
- ^{1} Playing statistics correct to the end of 2001.

Heath Culpitt (born 16 February 1978) is an Australian rules footballer. He played with Carlton in the Australian Football League.

From Castlemaine, Victoria, Culpitt played for Castlemaine Football Club in the Bendigo Football League, before his recruitment by Carlton at the 1999 AFL rookie draft. Culpitt made his senior AFL debut in 1999, and played fifteen games as a utility/midfielder before his delistment by Carlton at the end of the 2001 AFL season.

Since being delisted, Culpitt has played for Glenelg and Norwood in the South Australian National Football League, and for St Mary's and Waratah in the Northern Territory Football League. While with St Mary's in the 2005/06 NTFL season, Culpitt won the Nichols Medal as the league best and fairest.

In 2005, it was revealed that Culpitt was accused of rape in 1999. He was not charged, although the police were criticised for losing evidence in the investigation.
