= 1978–79 NTFL season =

58th season of the NTFL

- Teams: 6
- Premiers: St Marys; 10th premiership
- Minor premiers: Nightcliff; 6th minor premiership
- Wooden spooners: Waratah; 15th wooden spoon

The 1978–79 NTFL season was the 58th season of the Northern Territory Football League (NTFL).

St Marys have won there 10th premiership title while defeating the Nightcliff Tigers in the grand final by 31 points.

== Grand Final ==
Premiers	GF Score	Runner-up
St Marys	17.15 (117) - 13.8 (86)	Nightcliff
