= Eastern Australian Football League =

- Upcoming season or competition: 2018 EAFL season
- Formerly: South Eastern Australian Football League (2001–2005); North Eastern Australian Football League (1998–2005)
- Sport: Australian rules football
- Founded: 2005
- First season: 2005
- No. of teams: 7
- Country: US
- Most recent champion: New York Magpies (2012)
- Most titles: New York (6 premierships)
- Related competitions: USAFL

The Eastern Australian Football League is an Australian rules football competition in the Eastern United States of America and a division of the United States Australian Football League.

== History ==
In the early months of 2005, member clubs of the South Eastern Australian Football League and North Eastern Australian Football League on the eastern seaboard formed a new league, the Eastern AFL.

The league at the start of the 2005 season comprised the Florida Redbacks, the North Carolina Tigers, the Baltimore Washington Eagles, the Pittsburgh Wallabies, the Philadelphia Hawks, the New York Magpies and the Boston Demons. At the end of the season, Pittsburgh disbanded, and the Redbacks pulled out of the league due to high travel costs of playing the Northern teams. The league continued as a five-team division from 2006 until 2010.

From 2006, the USAFL's two Florida-based clubs, the Tampa area based Redbacks and Fort Lauderdale Fighting Squids, played together as the Florida United Saints, playing an independent schedule against teams in the Southeast. In 2010, the Saints played four of the five EAFL clubs (all except Boston). Prior to the 2011 season, the Redbacks and Squids ended their merger played as two separate clubs, with the Squids playing independently still and the Redbacks returning to play a full EAFL schedule. They returned to a regional schedule in 2012 before folding the following season.

Boston won the inaugural EAFL championship title over New York. The Magpies struck back in 2006 before the Eagles took out the flag in 2007 and 2008. The ensuing years saw Magpie domination as they finished top of the table in each of the years from 2009 through 2013 before the competition went on hiatus in 2013.

From 2005 through 2011, each team played the other once, the team with the best record being awarded the title. Home and away fixtures were reversed every year to ensure that each team played the others once and home and once away every two years. Scheduling conflicts and other logistical challenges prevented a full fixture from being played in 2012 and 2013, but the Magpies were crowned champions based on having the best record in full matches against the remaining EAFL sides. From 2014, each club scheduled irregular matches with the others, and league rankings were not kept, and the competition effectively went on hiatus.

In 2017, Baltimore-Washington president Antoun Issa expressed the desire for the legacy EAFL clubs to reform the competition for 2018 in the hope of restoring structure to the USAFL season for the involved clubs, and for the results to have consequences on seeding and placement at the USAFL National Championships at the end of each season. The goal was to have a full round-robin fixture similar to 2005–2011. With Baltimore-Washington expanding into two new clubs, the Baltimore Dockers and D.C. Eagles, and the Columbus Jackaroos joining the remaining four clubs—Boston, Philadelphia, New York, and North Carolina—that would mean a six-game schedule. But due to the varying resources, non-regional ambitions, and travel capabilities from the different clubs involved, not all clubs would be able to commit to such a full schedule. Thus, a pod-based, round robin schedule featuring 2x20 "lightning" matches was proposed which would still produce a full schedule, while at the same time reducing the commitment level of the clubs to three dates.

== Format ==
Each round will see one team will host two other teams in a three-way "pod", where each team plays the other two in 2x20 minute matches. The season is played over seven rounds, which each team getting the opportunity to host one round and traveling for the remaining two. That means that each side will play two home games, two "away" games against the club hosting the pod, and two "neutral" games against the other traveling club within the pod. The ladder follows the same format as the Australian Football League: four points for a win, two points for a draw, and none for a loss. Any ties for position are broken by points percentage: (PF / PA) * 100.

== Current clubs ==
Location map of current clubs in the league.

Club	Founded	Years in competition	League Premierships	Regionals Premierships
Baltimore Dockers	2017	2018-		
Boston Demons	1997	2005-	2005	
Columbus Cats	2008	2018-		
D.C. Eagles	2017	2018-		
New York Magpies	1998	2005-	2006, 2009, 2010, 2011, 2012, 2013	2016
North Carolina Tigers	1997	2005-		
Philadelphia Hawks	1998	2005-		2018

== Previous clubs ==
Club	Founded	Folded	Years in competition	League Premierships	Regional Premierships
Baltimore Washington Eagles	1998	2017	2005-	2007, 2008	2017
Pittsburgh Wallabies	2004	2006	2005		
Fort Lauderdale Fighting Squids	2005	Active	2015		2015
Florida Redbacks	1999	2013	2005, 2011		
