= 1952–53 NTFL season =

32nd season of the Northern Territory Football League

- Teams: 5
- Premiers: Waratah; 10th premiership
- Minor premiers: Waratah
- Wooden spooners: Nightcliff; 2nd wooden spoon

The 1952–53 NTFL season was the 32nd season of the Northern Territory Football League (NTFL).

Waratah won their 10th premiership title while defeating the Buffaloes in the grand final by 23 points.

== Grand Final ==
Premiers	GF Score	Runner-up
Waratah	10.10 (70) - 6.11 (47)	Buffaloes (Darwin)
