= 1956–57 NTFL season =

36th season of the NTFL

- Teams: 5
- Premiers: Nightcliff; 1st premiership
- Minor premiers: Nightcliff; 1st minor premiership
- Wooden spooners: Wanderers; 10th wooden spoon

The 1956–57 NTFL season was the 36th season of the Northern Territory Football League (NTFL).

Nightcliff have won there 1st premiership title while defeating the Buffaloes in the grand final by 27 points.

== Grand Final ==
Premiers	GF Score	Runner-up
Works and Housing (Nightcliff)	15.11 (101) - 12.2 (74)	Buffaloes (Darwin)
