= 2006–07 NTFL season =

86th season of the NTFL

- Teams: 7
- Premiers: Southern Districts; 2nd premiership
- Minor premiers: Southern Districts; 2nd minor premiership
- Wooden spooners: Darwin; 11th wooden spoon

The 2006–07 NTFL season was the 86th season of the Northern Territory Football League (NTFL).

Southern Districts Crocs have won there 2nd premiership title while defeating Waratah in the grand final by 9 points.

== Grand Final ==
Premiers	GF Score	Runner-up
Southern Districts	13.12 (90) - 11.15 (81)	Waratah
