= Damien Christensen =

Australian rules footballer (1963–2026)

Personal information
- Born: 16 October 1963
- Died: 28 April 2026 (aged 62)
- Original team: Lara (GDFL)
- Height: 1.77 m (5 ft 10 in)
- Weight: 75 kg (165 lb)

Playing career
Years	Club	Games (Goals)
1983–1986	Geelong	17 (8)

Damien Christensen (16 October 1963 – 28 April 2026) was an Australian rules footballer who played for Geelong in the Victorian Football League (VFL).

Originally from Geelong and District Football League (GDFL) club Lara, Christensen made his senior VFL debut in Round 11 1983, against Hawthorn at Princes Park, kicking three goals. Further senior opportunities were rare and Christensen finished his VFL career at the end of 1986, after 17 games with Geelong.

After his playing career, Christensen coached the Geelong Falcons and Victorian Football Association (VFA) clubs Williamstown, and Box Hill.

Christensen died on 28 April 2026, at the age of 62. His brother Marty and nephew Allen have also played for Geelong.
