= Matthew Ahmat =

Australian rules footballer

Personal information
- Full name: Matthew Ahmat
- Born: 27 June 1974 (age 52); Alice Springs, Northern Territory
- Original team: Darwin
- Height: 175 cm (5 ft 9 in)
- Weight: 75 kg (165 lb)

Playing career^{1}
Years	Club	Games (Goals)
1991–92	Brisbane Bears	6 (1)
1994	Sydney Swans	2 (0)
Total		8 (1)
- ^{1} Playing statistics correct to the end of 1994.

Matthew Ahmat (born 27 June 1974 in Alice Springs) is a former Indigenous Australian rules footballer who played for the Brisbane Bears and Sydney Swans in the Australian Football League (AFL) during the early 1990s.

The Ahmat name has had a long association with the Northern Territory Football League, as both his father and grandfather played at his original club, Darwin. He started his AFL career at Brisbane but struggled to establish a place in the Robert Walls coached side.

After spending the 1993 season in the South Australian National Football League (SANFL) playing for Norwood, Ahmat received a lifeline from Sydney, who recruited him with the first pick of the 1993 Mid-Season draft. Ahmat made appearances in two of the opening three rounds of Sydney's 1994 campaign but could not extend his AFL career any further.
