= New York Magpies =

Names
- Full name: New York Magpies Australian Rules Football Club
- Nickname(s): Magpies

Club details
- Founded: 1998
- Colours: Black White
- Competition: United States Australian Football League
- Premierships: USAFL D-1 (2): 2010, 2014; EAFL (5): 2006, 2009, 2010, 2011, 2012, 2013
- Ground(s): Tibbetts Brook Park

Other information
- Official website: http://newyorkmagpies.com
- Guernsey:

The New York Magpies are a United States Australian Football League Member Club, based in New York City, New York and founded in 1998 by Erik Kallhovd. The Magpies play in the Eastern Australian Football League and their home games are played at Tibbetts Brook Park.

== History ==
The New York City team became known as the Magpies when Richard Stremski, club historian of the Collingwood Football Club, furnished the fledgling club with footballs and guernseys. The Magpies and Collingwood FC have been affiliated ever since.

The club is also affiliated with the Port Adelaide Magpies in the SANFL, where some New York club players have enjoyed scholarships to play with the Port Adelaide club in Australia.

About half of the players of the New York Magpies team are Australian.

The New York Magpies won the Men's Division 1 & 4 USAFL National Championships Grand Final in 2010 and Division 1 in 2014.

== Honour Board ==
Honor Roll
Year	Position USAFL Nationals	Coach	Captain	Best & Fairest Men's	Best & Fairest Ladies	Leading goalkicker Men's	Leading goalkicker Ladies
1998							
1999				Dave Wake			
2000				Shane Smith			
2001				Shane Smith			
2002				James Paterson		Guy Luminato	
2003				Andrew Bridges		Peter Gurry	
2004	2 (Runners Up)			Kym Laube; Andrew Bridges		Kym Laube	
2005				Anthony Randell		Kym Laube	
2006				Andrew Bridges		Matthew Kimball	
2007				Luke North		Shane Batty	
2008				Jordan McIntyre; Joel Daniher	Monica Robbins	Shane Batty	Erin Polulach
2009				Joel Daniher	Andrea Casillas; Monica Robbins	James Hawkins	Kim Hemenway
2010	1 (Premiers)			Andy Brennan	Jane Moore	Andy Brennan	
2011				Jack Taylor	Christina Licata	Andy Brennan	
2012	2			Alex Kwiatkowski	Andrea Casillas	Sam Mitchell	
2013	3			Nigel Lee	Andrea Casillas	James Grierson	Renee Coff
2014	1 (Premiers)			Marcus Jankie	Melissa Fudor	Todd Smith	Janet Beyersdorf
2015	5			Marcus Jankie	Lissa Regets	Kerrin Hughes	Kim Hemenway
