= Nightcliff Football Club =

Nightcliff

Names
- Full name: Nightcliff Football Club
- Nickname: Tigers
- Club song: Tigerland

2025-26 season
- After finals: 1st
- Home-and-away season: 3rd

Club details
- Founded: 1950; 76 years ago
- Colours
- Competition: Northern Territory Football League
- President: Greame Shaw
- Coach: Chris Baksh
- Captain: Ryan Nyhuis
- Premierships: NTFL (7): 1956/57, 1960/61, 1964/65, 2018/19, 2019/20, 2020/21, 2025/26
- Ground: Nightcliff Oval

Uniforms
Home

Other information
- Official website: nightclifffootballclub.com.au

The Nightcliff Football Club, nicknamed, Tigers, is a member club of the Northern Territory Football League, and is based in the Darwin suburb of Nightcliff.

== Club achievements ==
Club achievements
Competition	Level	Num.	Year won
Northern Territory Football League	Premiers	7	1956/57, 1960/61, 1964/65, 2018/19, 2019/20, 2020/21, 2025/26
Northern Territory Football League	Runners Up	9	1957/58, 1965/66, 1973/74, 1978/79, 1985/86, 2001/02, 2003/04, 2011/12, 2023/24
Northern Territory Football League	Minor Premiers	12	1956/57, 1957/58, 1961/62, 1973/74, 1974/75*, 1978/79, 2003/04, 2011/12, 2018/19, 2019/20, 2020/21, 2021/22
Northern Territory Football League	Wooden Spoons	5	1950/51, 1952/53, 1992/93, 1995/96, 2010/11

- note: Nightcliff finished on top in the 1974/75 season after when it got cancelled after Round 11.

=== NTFL Women's ===
- Premiers (0): Nil
- Runners Up (3): 2021/22, 2024/25, 2025/26
- Wooden Spoons (7): 2004/05, 2006/07, 2010/11, 2011/12, 2016/17, 2017/18, 2018/19

== History ==
The club was formed in 1950. It was formally known as Working & Housing. Michael McLean was coach in 2005/06. Steve Easton was coach for the 2006/07 season.

Nightcliff Football Club has competed in the NTFL competition in Darwin, Northern Territory since it entered as the Works & Housing team in 1950. The Home and Away season commences in October with Finals played in March the following year.

The Club has its own home ground at the Nightcliff Oval (Darwin Mazda Oval) situated adjacent to the Nightcliff Sports Club. Games are also played at Darwin's TIO Marrara Stadium and various other club home grounds.

The Nightcliff Football Club was originally formed as Works and Housing Football Club in 1950 and competed in the 1950/51 NTFL season; the club was renamed Nightcliff Football Club in 1963/64.

In the early-1970s the football club established the Nightcliff Sports Club which is now an icon of the suburb and the football club is the proud senior affiliate of the Sports Club.

The football club runs teams in the Premier League, Division 1, Under 18, Under 16, Under 14 and Under 12 grades.

=== Football exports ===
The club has produced many AFL players, including Collingwood and Brisbane Lions players Jason Roe and Anthony Corrie, Melbourne player, Liam Jurrah, Fremantle's Ryan Nyhuis, Melbourne player Andy Moniz-Wakefield and Carlton's Wade Derksen.

In the 2016 AFL draft, Geelong selected Tigers' product Brandan Parfitt, the youngest winner of the club's Best and Fairest award. when he won it at 16.

== Club song ==
Oh we're from Tigerland
A fighting fury we're from Tigerland
In any weather you will see us with a grin, Risking head and shin
If we're behind, we never mind we'll fight and fight and win
Oh we're from Tigerland
We never weaken til the final sirens goes
Like the tigers of old, we're strong and we're bold
Oh we're from Tiger
-YELLOW AND BLACK-
Oh we're from Tigerland
-EAT 'EM ALIVE-
We're from Tigerland
