= United States Australian Football League =

Governing body for Australian rules football in the United States

- Sport: Australian rules football
- Founded: 1996
- Founder: Paul O'Keeffe and Rich Mann
- First season: 1997
- No. of teams: 46 (men's) and 25 (women's)
- Country: USA
- Most recent champions: Men's: Austin Crows (10th premiership); Women's: Minnesota Freeze (2nd premiership) (2025)
- Most titles: Men: Austin Crows (10 premierships); Women: Golden Gate Iron Maidens (7 premierships)
- Broadcaster: YouTube
- Website: aussierulesusa.com

The United States Australian Football League (USAFL) is the governing body for Australian rules football in the United States. It was conceived in 1996 and organized in 1997. It is based in Sun Prairie, Wisconsin.

As of 2011, there were over 1,000 registered USAFL players. There are 46 member clubs, of which 45 have men's teams (all except North Star Blue Ox) and 25 have women's teams. Most of the football clubs in the United States have a traditional 18-a-side team for representative purposes and multiple 9-a-side teams running in a local league.

Each year the USAFL holds a National club championship, a tournament open to all clubs across the nation, the largest of its type in the world for the sport. In addition to the Nationals, the USAFL holds major regional tournaments including the Central, East and West regional tournaments.

The USAFL selects the national men's (USA Revolution) and women's (USA Freedom) teams for competitions such as the Australian Football International Cup and the 49th Parallel Cup.

== History ==
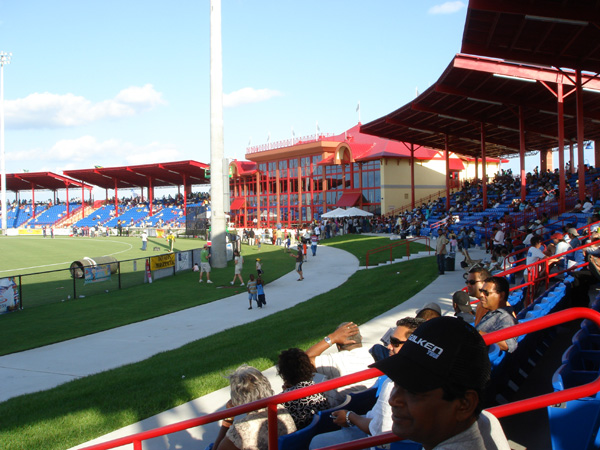
CRBR Park Stadium is the largest purpose-built cricket/Australian football ground in the United States. It has a capacity of 20,000.

The first match between two local US clubs was played in 1996 between Cincinnati and Louisville. In the first year the Mid American Australian Football League was formed. Many of the local players had found out about the game in the 1980s on television via the then-nascent ESPN cable network. Although the local game grew, ESPN no longer broadcast AFL matches, and in response the lobby group, Australian Football Association of North America was formed.

In 1997, the first club national championships were held in Cincinnati. Nashville hosted the first Australian Grand Final Festival in the same year. The United States Australian Football League (USAFL) was formed in 1997 to govern the code in the country.

The involvement of many well-known Australians has helped boost the relations between the USAFL and AFL. In the early days, Paul Roos was a key figure.

Robert DiPierdomenico, Leigh Matthews and Michael Voss are official USAFL ambassadors.

== National teams ==
USAFL is responsible for the co-ordination of the National Teams, the USA Revolution men's team and the USA Freedom women's team. The team plays in international tournaments and exhibition matches against other countries. National team players are selected from the best US-born players from the club teams across the country.

With close proximity to Canada, the Revolution & Freedom participate in the annual 49th Parallel Cup against Canada each year except for years of the Australian Football International Cup. As of the last edition in 2023, the Revolution men have won eleven of the twelve meetings against the Canada Northwind, while the Freedom women have fallen to the Canada Northern Lights in five of seven contests.

The Revolution competed in the 2002 Australian Football International Cup, finishing 5th out of 11 countries and in the 2005 Australian Football International Cup finishing 3rd out of 10 countries. They competed in the 2008 Australian Football International Cup, where the Revolution finished 7th out of 16 countries. At the 2011 Australian Football International Cup, the Revolution finished 4th in an increased field of 18 countries. The Revolution finished 8th at the 2014 Australian Football International Cup, again with 18 countries participating. They would come in 4th at the 2017 Australian Football International Cup which, as of 2024, was the last edition.

After completing a tour of Australia in 2009, the Freedom were one of five teams to compete in the first International Cup Women's Division at the 2011 Australian Football International Cup, finishing third. At the 2014 Australian Football International Cup, the Freedom finished in third place again while a reserves team, the USA Liberty, came in last of the seven competing teams. Three years later, the Freedom finished fourth at the 2017 Australian Football International Cup while the Liberty went 3–2 in five matches against teams from various leagues in and around Melbourne.

After the postponement and subsequent cancellation of the International Cup in 2020, 2021, 2023 and 2024, both the Revolution and Freedom took part in the 2024 AFL Transatlantic Cup, one of three regional tournaments scheduled by the AFL to sustain the international Aussie Rules game until the International Cup could be restored. Both American teams would advance to the Grand Final, and both would lose to Ireland.

== Domestic tournaments and competitions ==
- USAFL National Championships
- USAFL East vs West
- 49th Parallel Cup

== USAFL clubs and representative sides ==
=== USAFL Senior Teams ===
Club	Colours	Nickname	City	Home Ground	Region	Years active	National Championship Titles			
Club	Colours	Nickname	City	Home Ground	Region	Years active	Male		Female	
Club	Colours	Nickname	City	Home Ground	Region	Years active	Total	Most recent	Total	Most recent
Arizona		Hawks	Phoenix, Arizona	Countryside Park, Mesa	West	1999-	3	2021	0	-
Atlanta		Kookaburras	Atlanta, Georgia	Phoenix II Park, Summerhill	East	1998-	0	-	3	2007
Austin		Crows	Austin, Texas	Zilker Park, Barton Hills	Central	2002-	10	2025	0	-
Baltimore		Dockers	Baltimore, Maryland	Herring Run Park, Baltimore	East	2017-	0	-	0	-
Baton Rouge		Tigers	Baton Rouge, Louisiana	Flanacher Park, Zachary	Central	2004-	0	-	0	-
Bayou		Brawlers	New Orleans, Louisiana	Pelican Park, Mandeville	Central	2025-	0	-	0	-
Birmingham		Bushrangers	Birmingham, Alabama	Heardmont Park, Birmingham	East	2020-	0	-	0	-
Boston		Demons	Boston, Massachusetts	Millennium Park, West Roxbury	East	1997-	3	2022	0	-
Chicago		Swans	Chicago, Illinois	Waveland Softball Fields, Lake View	Central	1998-	1	2012	0	-
Cincinnati		Dockers	Cincinnati, Ohio	Sheakley Lawn, University of Cincinnati	Central	1996-	2	2004	0	-
Cleveland		Cannons	Cleveland, Ohio	Edgewater Park, Detroit-Shoreway and Brookside Park, Stockyards	Central	2014-	0	-	0	-
Columbus		Cats	Columbus, Ohio	Three Creeks Park, South Alum Creek	Central	2008-	1	2013	0	-
DC Eagles		Eagles	Washington, D.C.	West Potomac Park, Washington D.C	East	2017-	1	2021	0	-
Denver		Bulldogs	Denver, Colorado	Central Park, Recreation Centre, Central Park	Central	1998-	9	2022	6	2015
Des Moines		Roosters	Des Moines, Iowa	Valley Southwoods Freshman High School, West Des Moines	Central	2010-	0	-	0	-
Finger Lakes		Blue Herons	Syracuse, New York	Burnet Park, Westside	East	2024-	0	-	0	-
Fort Lauderdale		Fighting Squids	Fort Lauderdale, Florida		East	2005-	0	-	0	-
Golden Gate		Roos (men), Iron Maidens (women)	San Francisco, California	Bushrod Park, North Oakland;	West	1998-	1	2005	7	2023
Houston		Lonestars	Houston, Texas	Cullen Intramural Field, Greater Third Ward	Central	2005-	2	2024	0	-
Indianapolis		Giants	Indianapolis, Indiana	Broad Ripple Park, Broad Ripple	Central	2013-2021	0	-	0	-
Jacksonville		Saints	Jacksonville, Florida	Alexandria Oaks Park, San Marco	East	2018-	0	-	0	-
Kansas City		Power	Kansas City, Missouri	Liberty Memorial, Kansas City	Central	1998-	2	2008	0	-
Las Vegas		Gamblers	Las Vegas, Nevada	Summerlin Centre Community Park, Summerlin South	West	2005-	1	2006	0	-
Los Angeles		Dragons	Los Angeles, California	Westchester Recreation Center, Westchester	West	2010-	1	2014	0	-
Louisville		Kings	Louisville, Kentucky	Seneca Park, Rockcreek-Lexington Road	Central	1996-2023	0	-	0	-
Maine		Cats	Portland, Maine	Wainwright Sports Complex, South Portland	East	2018-	0	-	0	-
Minnesota		Freeze	Minneapolis, Minnesota	Eagan Community Center, Eagan	Central	2005-	4	2018	1	2024
Nashville		Kangaroos	Nashville, Tennessee	Elmington Park, Hillsboro West End	Central	1997-	0	-	0	-
New York		Magpies	New York City, New York	Tibbetts Brook Park, Yonkers	East	1998-	3	2014	0	-
North Carolina		Tigers	Raleigh, North Carolina	Thompson Rad Park, Garner	East	1997-	0	-	0	-
North Star Blue Ox		Blue Ox	Minneapolis-Saint Paul, Minnesota	BF Nelson Park, St Anthony West	Central	2017-	0	-	0	-
North Texas		Devils	Plano, Texas	Breckinridge Reserve, Richardson	Central	2020-	0	-	0	-
Oklahoma		Buffaloes	Tulsa, Oklahoma	Dream Keepers, Riverview	Central	2010-	0	-	0	-
Orange County		Giants	Orange County, California	La Veta Elementary School, Orange	West	1998-	1	2002	0	-
Philadelphia		Hawks	Philadelphia, Pennsylvania	Lower Perkiomen Valley Park, Oaks	East	1998-	3	2023	0	-
Portland		Steelheads (men), Sockeyes (women)	Portland, Oregon	Clinton Park, South Tabor	West	1998-	2	2016	0	-
Rome		Redbacks	Rome, Georgia	Grizzard Park, Berwin	East	2018-	0	-	0	-
Sacramento		Suns	Sacramento, California	South Natomas Community Field, South Natomas	West	2009-	2	2023	0	-
San Diego		Lions	San Diego, California	Nobel Recreation Center, University City	West	1997-	3	2019	0	-
Savannah		Hurricane	Savannah, Georgia	Daffin Park, Parkside	East	2017-	0	-	0	-
Seattle		Grizzlies	Seattle, Washington	Vassault Park, Tacoma	West	1998-	2	2018	0	-
St Louis		Blues	St. Louis, Missouri	Forest Park Cricket Field, Forest Park	Central	1997-	0	-	0	-
Tampa Bay		Tiger Sharks	Tampa Bay and St. Petersburg, Florida	Flora Wylie Park, Historic Old Northeast	East	2017-	0	-	0	-
Virginia		Lions	Richmond, Virginia	Roseland Farm, Crozet	East	2018-	0	-	0	-
Wasatch		WarGulls	Salt Lake City, Utah	Sugar House Park, Sugar House	West	2019-	0	-	0	-
Wilmington		Bombers	Wilmington, North Carolina	Wrightsville Beach Park, Wrightsville Beach	East	2024-	0	-	0	-
Wisconsin		Wombats	Madison, Wisconsin	Door Creek Park, Sprecher East	Central	2017-	0	-	0	-

=== Associate Members (via AFL Canada) ===
Club	Colours	Nickname	City	Home Ground	Region	Est.	National Championship Titles			
Club	Colours	Nickname	City	Home Ground	Region	Est.	Male		Female	
Club	Colours	Nickname	City	Home Ground	Region	Est.	Total	Most recent	Total	Most recent
Calgary		Kangaroos	Calgary, Alberta	AE Cross Oval, Glenbrook	AFL Canada	2002	4	2024	1	2008
Quebec		Saints	Montreal, Quebec		AFL Canada	2008-2019	2	2017	0	-

=== USAFL Collegiate Teams ===
Club	Colours	Nickname	City	Region	Est.	Senior Club Affiliate
Cincinnati		Bearcats	Cincinnati, Ohio	Central	2024	Cincinnati Dockers
William & Mary		Tribe	Williamsburg, Virginia	East	2025	Virginia Lions

== Defunct clubs ==
Club	Colours	Nickname	City	Home Ground	Est.	Years in USAFL	National Championship Titles				Fate
Club	Colours	Nickname	City	Home Ground	Est.	Years in USAFL	Male		Female		Fate
Club	Colours	Nickname	City	Home Ground	Est.	Years in USAFL	Total	Most recent	Total	Most recent	Fate
Arizona		Outlaws	Phoenix, Arizona	Benedict Sports Complex, Tempe	West	2018-2021	0	-	0	-	Absorbed back into Arizona Hawks in 2022
Baltimore Washington		Eagles	Baltimore, Maryland and Washington, D.C.		East	1998-2017	2	2006	0	-	Split to form Baltimore Dockers and DC Eagles in 2018
Charleston		Saints	Charleston, South Carolina		East	2011–2015	0	-	0	-	Folded after 2015 season
Centennial		Tigers	Denver, Colorado	Washington Park, Denver	Central	2020-2022	0	-	0	-	Withdrew from league in 2023
Dallas		Dingoes	Dallas, Texas		Central	1998-2023	1	2011	0	-	Inactive since 2023
Detroit		Overdrive	Detroit, Michigan		Central	1999–2006	0	-	0	-	Folded after 2006 season
Florida		Redbacks	St. Petersburg, Florida	Crescent Lake Park, Crescent Lake	East	1999–2013	0	-	0	-	Folded after 2013 season
Grovetown		Pirates	Grovetown, Georgia	Patriots Park, Grovetown	East	2021-2024	0	-	0	-	Inactive since 2024
Hawai'i		Eagles	Honolulu, Hawaii	Kapi'olani Park, Diamond Head-Kapahulu-St. Louis	West	2019-2019	0	-	0	-	Inactive since 2023
Illinois		Ironmen	Chicago, Illinois			2000–2004	0	-	0	-	Merged with Chicago Swans in 2005
Inland Empire		Eagles				1997–2002	0	-	0	-	Folded after 2002 season
Lehigh Valley		Crocs			East	1999–2003	0	-	0	-	Absorbed byPhiladelphia Hawks in 2004
Little Rock		Coyotes	Little Rock, Arkansas	Pinnacle Mountain Park, Pinnacle	Central	2017-2021	0	-	0	-	Folded after 2021 season
Los Angeles		Crows	Los Angeles, California		West	1996–2003	0	-	0	-	Folded after 2003 season
Milwaukee		Bombers	Milwaukee, Wisconsin	Kletzsch Park, Glendale	Central	1998-2019	1	2003	1	2009	Inactive since 2019
Mojave		Greens			West	2003–2006	0	-	0	-	Folded after 2006 season
Oklahoma City		Flyers	Oklahoma City, Oklahoma	Will Rogers Park, Grand Portland	Central	2016-2017	0	-	0	-	Absorbed into Oklahoma Buffaloes in 2017
Pittsburgh		Wallabies	Pittsburgh, Pennsylvania		East	2004–2006	0	-	0	-	Absorbed by Philadelphia Hawks in 2006
South Carolina		Hawks	South Carolina		East	1999–2001	0	-	0	-	Folded after 2001 season
St. Petersburg		Swans	St. Petersburg, Florida		East	2014-2017	0	-	0	-	Left to create Major League Footy, both folded in 2019
Tri Cities		Saints				1999–2004	0	-	0	-	Folded after 2004 season
Tucson		Javelinas	Tucson, Arizona		West	1999–2004	0	-	0	-	Folded after 2004 season
Vancouver		Cougars	Vancouver, British Columbia, Canada				1	2008	0	-	Former Associate member

== Affiliated leagues ==
- Mid American Australian Football League
- Eastern Australian Football League
- Southern California Australian Football League

== See also ==
- Metro Footy
- Women's Australian Football Association
