= Southern Districts Football Club =

Southern Districts

Names
- Full name: Southern Districts Football Club
- Nickname: Crocs
- Club song: "Cheer Cheer The Red Black And White" (to the tune of the Sydney Swans song)

2025–26 season
- After finals: 3rd
- Home-and-away season: 1st

Club details
- Founded: 1981; 45 years ago
- Colours
- Competition: Northern Territory Football League
- President: Kevin Mulvahil
- Coach: Shannon Rusca and Dave Barnard
- Captain: Michael Bowden
- Premierships: NTFL (4): 1997/98, 2006/07, 2017/18, 2024/25
- Ground: Norbuilt Oval

Uniforms
Home

Other information
- Official website: sdfccrocs.com.au

The Southern Districts Football Club, nicknamed the Crocs, is an Australian rules football club established in 1981. The club plays in the Northern Territory Football League at semi-professional level and represents the rural area of Litchfield.

Premier League ('A' Grade)

The club won their first ever 'A' Grade Premiership under Coach Mark Motlop in the 1997/98 season defeating St Mary's.

Michael "Magic" McLean coached for a number of seasons commencing with the 2006/07 Premiership season.

Shannon Rusca became Senior Coach in the 2012/13 season. Shannon who played as the youngest Premier League premiership player as a 17-year-old in the club's first 'A' grade Premiership in the 1997/98 season was Captain in the 2006/07 season Premiership winning team playing as a Player / Assistant Coach under "Magic". Then in the 2017/18 season coached the team to the club's third Premier League premiership.

== Club achievements ==
Club achievements
Competition	Level	Num.	Year won
Northern Territory Football League	Premiers	4	1997/98, 2006/07, 2017/18, 2024/25
Northern Territory Football League	Runners Up	3	1995/96, 2018/19, 2022/23
Northern Territory Football League	Minor Premiers	8	1997/98, 2006/07, 2007/08, 2015/16, 2017/18, 2022/23, 2024/25, 2025/26
Northern Territory Football League	Wooden Spoons	4	1991/92, 2002/03, 2003/04, 2005/06

=== NTFL Women's ===
- Premiers (1): 2019/20
- Runners Up (1): 2018/19
- Wooden Spoons (4): 2005/06, 2013/14, 2014/15, 2015/16

== History ==
The club was formed in the early 1980s. In 1981 it entered the NTFL with one junior grade and a 'C' grade men's side. The club gradually entered more grades until it entered a side into the 'A' Grade in the 1987/88 season.

The club has produced many quality players at AFL level, including Collingwood Football Club great Nathan Buckley. Other players from the club include Gilbert McAdam, Adrian McAdam, Michael O'Loughlin, Aaron Shattock, Fabian Francis, Shannon Rusca, Steven Koops, and Shawn Lewfatt. Other Crocs juniors players Roger Smith and Bradley Copeland were also drafted to AFL clubs in the early seasons of the Crocs but didn't manage to play an AFL game.

More recently it has produced (Brisbane Lions/Collingwood Football Club) Anthony Corrie, (Richmond Football Club/Adelaide Football Club) Richard Tambling, (Brisbane Lions/Gold Coast Football Club) Jared Brennan, (Western Bulldogs) Malcolm Lynch, (Richmond Football Club) Troy Taylor, (Gold Coast Football Club) Steven May, (Geelong Football Club) Nakia Cockatoo, with Zac Bailey being the most recently drafted player to the Brisbane Lions in the 2017 Australian Football League draft

Other players who have for the club over the years that played for the Crocs before playing AFL or after playing AFL include Allen Jakovich who kicked 104 goals in his first season at the Crocs in the 1988/89 NTFL season, Brisbane Lions Premiership players Chris Johnson, Des Headland and Darryl White (who played in the SDFC 2006/07 NTFL Premiership side). Damian Cupido (Brisbane Lions) and (Essendon Football Club) played for the Crocs in the 2012/13 and 2013/14 NTFL seasons kicking 140 goals in his first season at the club. James Kelly (Geelong Football Club), Simon Buckley (Collingwood Football Club/Melbourne Football Club), Robert Copeland (Brisbane Lions Football Club), Laurence Angwin (Carlton Football Club). Mark Jamar played for the Crocs after being delisted by Melbourne Football Club but then he was picked up by the Essendon Football Club as a top up player so had another season of AFL before returning to the Crocs and playing in the 2017/18 Premier League Premiership winning Crocs team. Ed Barlow (Sydney Swans/Western Bulldogs) also played in the same Premiership team after three seasons with the Crocs.

== Club song ==
Sung to the tune: "Notre Dame Victory March"

Cheer, cheer the red, black and white,
Honour the Crocs by day and by night,
Lift that noble banner high,
Shake down the thunder from the sky
Weather the odds be great or small,
We'll come out and win overall
While our players keep on fighting
Onward to victory!
