= Darwin Football Club =

Australian rules football club

Darwin

Names
- Full name: Darwin Football Club
- Nickname: Buffaloes

2025-26 season
- After finals: DNQ
- Home-and-away season: 7th

Club details
- Founded: 1916; 110 years ago
- Colours
- Competition: Northern Territory Football League
- President: Brenda Atkinson
- Coach: Phillip Wills
- Captain: Jarrod Stokes
- Premierships: NTFL (23): 1921/22, 1924/25, 1925/26, 1926/27, 1931/32, 1933/34, 1934/35, 1935/36, 1948/49, 1949/50, 1950/51, 1951/52, 1962/63, 1963/64, 1967/68, 1968/69, 1969/70, 1970/71, 1972/73, 1975/76, 1979/80, 1988/89, 2005/06
- Ground: Woodroffe Oval

Uniforms
Home

Other information
- Official website: http://darwinbuffaloes.com.au

The Darwin Football Club, nicknamed the Buffaloes, is an Australian rules football club competing in the Northern Territory Football League. It is the third-oldest football club in the Northern Territory. Darwin has won the second-most premierships in the NTFL competition. It has produced a large number of Australian Footballers who went on to play professionally in the Australian Football League.

== Club achievements ==
Club achievements
Competition	Level	Num.	Year won
Northern Territory Football League	Premiers	23	1921/22, 1924/25, 1925/26, 1926/27, 1931/32, 1933/34, 1934/35, 1935/36, 1948/49, 1949/50, 1950/51, 1951/52, 1962/63, 1963/64, 1967/68, 1968/69, 1969/70, 1970/71, 1972/73, 1975/76, 1979/80, 1988/89, 2005/06
Northern Territory Football League	Runners Up	30	1919/20, 1929/30, 1930/31, 1932/33, 1936/37, 1937/38, 1938/39, 1940/41, 1946/47, 1947/48, 1952/53, 1953/54, 1954/55, 1956/57, 1958/59, 1959/60, 1961/62, 1964/65, 1966/67, 1971/72, 1983/84, 1986/87, 1987/88, 1989/90, 1990/91, 1991/92, 1993/94, 1994/95, 2000/01, 2017/18
Northern Territory Football League	Minor Premiers	17*	Note: These results only show from after 1946. Stats before that year are still on search.; 1947/48, 1948/49, 1949/50, 1950/51, 1951/52, 1953/54, 1962/63, 1963/64, 1964/65, 1967/68, 1968/69, 1970/71, 1971/72, 1972/73, 1975/76, 1979/80, 1993/94
Northern Territory Football League	Wooden Spoons	16	1916/17, 1917/18, 1918/19, 1920/21, 1922/23, 1923/24, 1927/28, 1928/29, 1960/61, 1996/97, 2006/07, 2008/09, 2009/10, 2011/12, 2012/13, 2013/14

=== NTFL Women's ===
- Premiers (2): 2016/17, 2021/22
- Runners Up (5): 2004/05, 2006/07, 2013/14, 2017/18, 2020/21
- Wooden Spoons (2): 2007/08, 2008/09

== History ==
The club was formed in 1916. They've been known as Warriors in 1917, Vestey's in 1918, Buffaloes in 1926, Darwin in 1963 and eventually the Darwin Buffaloes in 2010.

The Buffaloes Premier League Men have won 23 titles in the competition. Their most recent win was in the 2005/06 NTFL Grand Final.

The Buffaloes (Buffettes) Premier League Women won the 2016/17 and 2021/22 NTFL Grand Finals.

The club relocated from Marrara Stadium to Woodroffe Oval, Palmerston for the 2025/26 NTFL season.

The club has produced many prominent AFL players, including Matthew Whelan, Andrew McLeod, Matthew Ahmat, Robert Ahmat, Matthew Campbell, Darryl White, Matthew Whelan, Cameron Stokes, Joe Anderson, Jed Anderson and Malcolm Rosas Jr.
