= Australian rules football in the United States =

- Country: United States
- Governing body: USAFL
- National teams: Men's; Women's
- First played: 1906
- Registered players: 2,000 (total); 1,000 (recreational)
- Clubs: 49

National competitions
- USAFL

Audience records
- Single match: 14,787 (1990); Melbourne v West Coast (Civic Stadium, Portland)

In the United States, Australian rules football (most commonly referred to simply as "Footy" but sometimes "Aussie Rules" or AFL) is a team and spectator sport which has grown rapidly across the country since 1996. The USAFL National Championships is currently the largest club tournament in the world with 41 teams competing across 6 divisions in 2022. A national youth team has also been established and participation is growing in women's teams, junior teams and in modified and non-contact variations such as Metro Footy and Footy 7s. The United States Australian Football League (USAFL) is the governing body, with various clubs and leagues around the country it oversees more than 2,000 players more than half of which are American. An active fan based organization, the Australian Football Association of North America also exists to promote a broader audience.

It was originally introduced in 1906 and by 1910 "field ball" or "fieldball", as it was then called in San Francisco Bay area schools, filled a niche later occupied by soccer. By 1911 with the rapid expansion to schools and colleges in three major cities the U.S. overtook New Zealand to become the second largest Australian football playing nation in the world and there were three reciprocal tours with international matches played at junior level between 1909 and 1919. However availability of officials, large fields, squads of sufficient size and difficulty in differentiating it from rugby as well as a lack of support from the game's administrators in Australia stunted its growth and it went into permanent recess at the end of the 1920s. It was rekindled in the 1980s through interest generated mainly from television highlights from Australia. Prior to this, it has been confused with rugby football which is less popular than American football in the U.S. The USAFL's founding president Paul O'Keefe made efforts to differentiate it through promotion of the moniker "footy". The world governing body, the AFL Commission has also made efforts to differentiate it, producing educational videos such as "What is AFL?" aimed at a North American audience.

The country is a source of professional talent for the Australian Football League (AFL) with clubs began taking interest in converting American athletes, particularly amateur college basketball, college football and soccer players with an AFL International Combine being held since 2010. While many moved to Australia to further their careers, only a handful have made the grade, most notably: Jason Holmes, Mason Cox playing senior AFL and Danielle Marshall in the AFL Women's. Mason Cox's success has seen a boom in interest since 2016.

The national men's team - the USA Revolution - debuted in 1999, its best result is bronze the 2005 Australian Football International Cup and has won the 49th Parallel Cup 10 out of 11 times. The national women's team, the USA Freedom - debuted in 2007 and reached bronze in the 2011 Australian Football International Cup.

== History ==
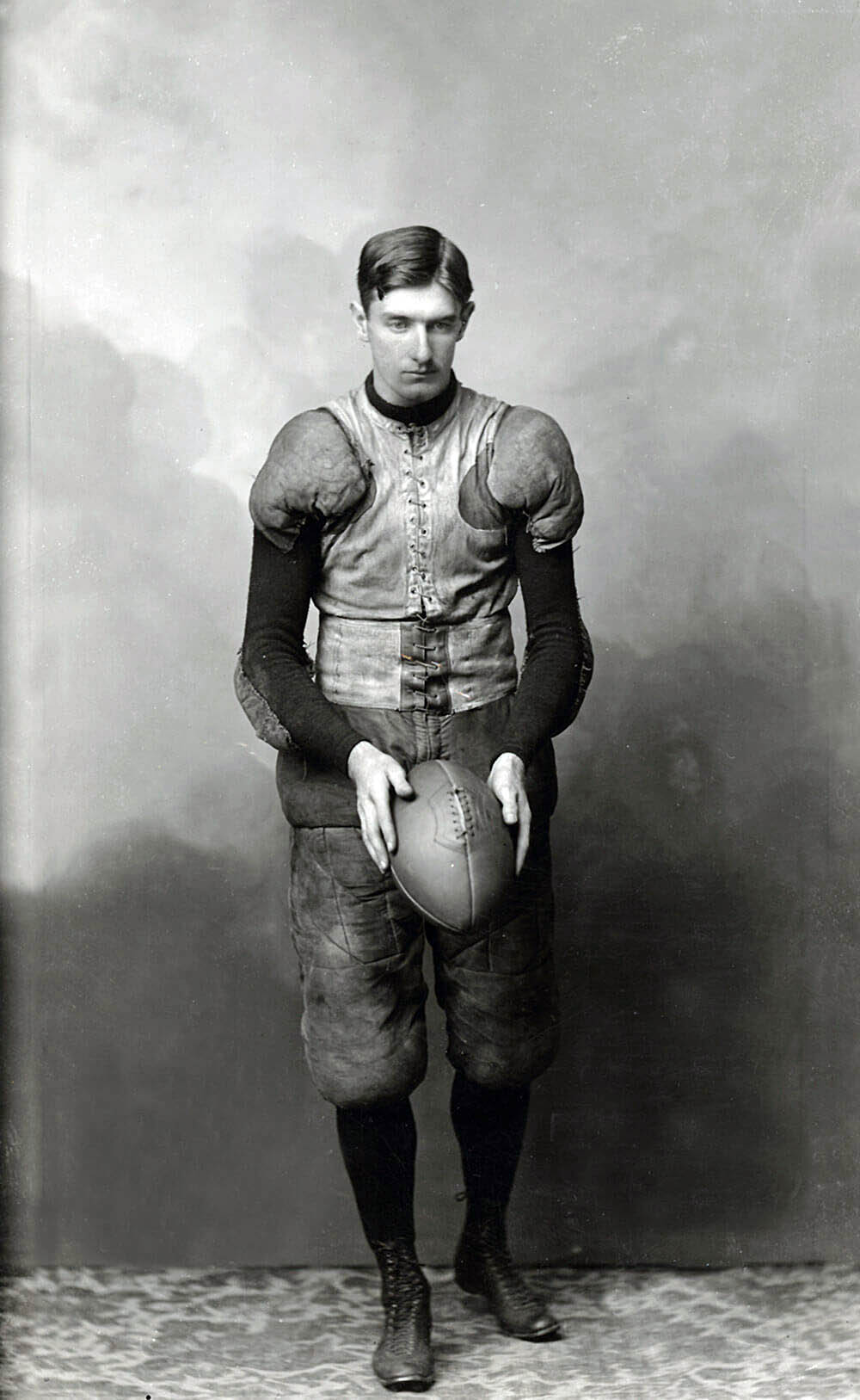
Australian-American footballer Pat O'Dea helped introduce Australian Rules into Californian schools in 1908

Australian rules football was virtually unheard of in the United States in the 19th Century. American football, soccer and Rugby Football were all established sports and Americans had limited awareness of the Australian game. Even Gaelic football had been introduced to the United States by 1892.

Australian football player Pat O'Dea moved to America in 1898 to visit his brother in Wisconsin and quickly became a legendary gridiron punter. O'Dea made headlines as the "Kangaroo Kicker" in the late 1890s. Yet rarely any received any mention of developing his kicking prowess through the Australian game, let alone his previous career in Australia with the Melbourne Football Club.

A 1905 VFL Report made mention of a request from parties including president Theodore Roosevelt in the U.S. in obtaining copies of the Laws of the Game. The enquiry was due to a spike in deaths and injuries in American football, and inquiries into ways to make its football games safer. In response, the VFL enthusiastically wrote to 69 American universities and colleges insisting that they adopt the VFL's laws and affiliate with the newly formed Australasian Football Council (AFC) which it led. According to De Moore (2021) this overconfidence of the VFL in the superiority of its league competition backfired spectacularly in that it inadvertently led to the introduction of intercollegiate rugby into the United States, a 1912 Australia rugby union tour of Canada and the United States and the establishment of rugby union in the United States, effectively denying Australian Football the opportunity to become established. Furthermore, American players did not adopt any of the VFL's laws, however their investigations eventually led to legalizing the forward pass to open up the field of play a distinctive feature of the game today.

Following the VFL's failed attempt to convert the colleges, and its underestimation of the pull of global rugby, the league resolved not to respond to any further requests for copies of the game's laws. It successfully lobbied the AFC not to support the game being played outside Australasia, much to the frustration of proponents such as West Australian Football League secretary John J Simons.

Simons, while organizing a promotional Australian Football tour of England, had sought to include the U.S. and wrote to various football groups including expatriate Australians in North America to express interest in fielding teams against the Australians. He initially wrote to Con Hickey, chairman of the VFL for assistance, proposing the league send a touring side and provide funding, however Hickey replied that the VFL would not support the initiative believing it would be a failure. While the tour never went ahead, Simons was instrumental in the formation of teams in Vancouver and several Australians in America also answered the call.

=== First introduction: 1906–1909 ===
In 1906 Pat O'Dea along with his older brother and kicking mentor Andrew (of the Wisconsin University Athletic Club and its American football coach) were able to attain a copy of the Victorian Football Association's rules (as this league was not affiliated with the AFC) and had begun training college students at the University of Wisconsin–Madison. Another expatriate Victorian cricketer A Warne, working with the Philadelphia City Council introduced the game in Pennsylvania along with cricket. But it was ex-Fremantle WAFL player Charles Lynan, then working at the Southern Pacific Transportation Company in San Francisco who had the most success training students, most of whom were basketballers and rugby players, at Columbia Park Grammar School. The VFL in 1908 through Hickey had begun to promote universal football as a preferred alternative to Australian rules for North Americans to play and compete against Australia, anticipating the league to adopt the rectangular field over the traditional oval field. Lynan seeing the trend away from American football as a major opportunity, and in response to a burgeoning local rugby community initially sought to convince the newly formed San Francisco Barbarians Rugby Club and also Stanford's newly formed rugby team, who had been actively seeking less violent alternatives to American football, to try Australian Football. Though he garnered their support, including a financial commitment, the fanfare of the Australian rugby team's tour and matches against the two clubs in 1909 saw them lose interest in the venture. Following the tour, "Australian football" had to Americans, become synonymous with rugby.

Lynan decided that teaching younger players would be more effective to differentiate it and engaged O'Dea (following his move to San Francisco to practice law) to assist him to popularize it. By January 1909, they had trained more than 450 junior athletes to choose the best to form a squad. Having gained the support of the Public Schools Athletic Association of San Francisco president and founder of the Columbia Park Boys' Club Major Sidney Piexotto, Lynan and O'Dea, in correspondence with Australian football organizations including the WAFL and Young Australia League (YAFL) (who earlier had donated two footballs to the school) organized a cross-cultural excursion, feeling that their American boys were ready to take on Australia.

Simons once again applied to the VFL to provide a week's board, to which the league telegraphed that it was "totally opposed to the scheme" and refused any support. Undeterred, Simons as chairman of both the WAFL and YAFL, arranged for these leagues to fully fund the American's travel and board, providing £3,000 for an exchange visit. A management committee was formed consisting of: Lynan, B. Free, L. Resleur, R. Buchanan, William McCann and T. Wood with a coaching panel consisting of Pat O'Dea, Lynan, Buchanan and Price. The 40 selected schoolboys, most of them also baseball players set sail on the SS Mariposa on May 21, 1909.

=== First schoolboys tour of Australia: 1909 ===
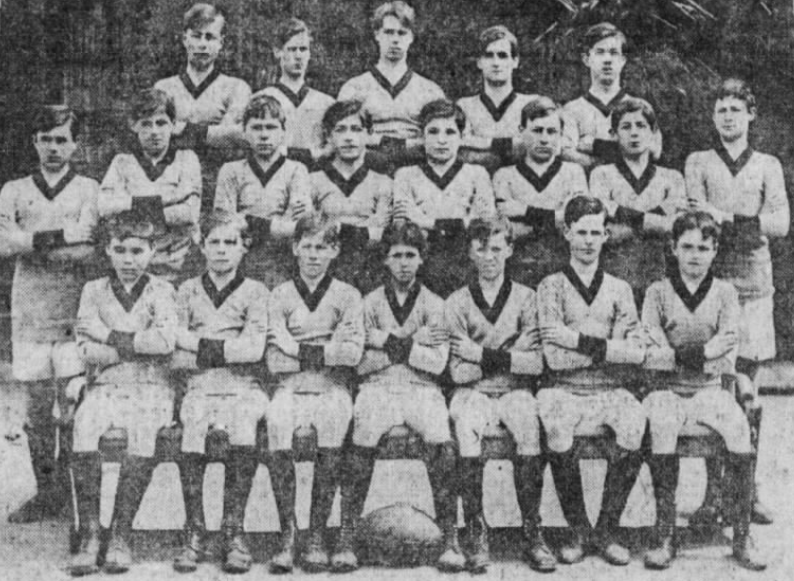
First American schoolboys team to tour Australia. San Francisco. April, 1909

The initial tour was ambitious, and intended to visit many nations of the Commonwealth including all Australian states and play football matches, however in addition to the WAFL and YAFL reply invitations were received only from the New South Wales Football Association in Sydney and VFA in Melbourne, Victoria. The football side consisted of: Henry Behre (captain); Edward Burke (vice captain); James Caveney; Frank B. Cliff; John Costello; Charles Day; Frank Danis; Edward Firestone; Harris Fraser; Michael Glaser; E. Griswold; Robert Hayes; Emil Hastings; Garnet Holme; A. Johnson; Benjamin Katz; James Kerrigan; Harvey Loy; G. Locke; C. Meinhart; H. Meanwell; Adolph Muheim; Charles Nagel; Edward Nelson; Charles Norton; Roy O'Connell; Alfred Peterson; William Prang; Hyman Raphael; Sidney Rosenthal; Edward Ryan; IA. Schmoll; A. Schmulowitz; Theo Steffens; E.Stern; Frank Trachsler; A. Truhler; Lee Waymire; Peter Weber; Claude Weinhart; George Wihr; Edward Wilson; Sheridan Williams; George White; and, Leon Wing.

From a football perspective, the tour was an outstanding success. The team won an impressive 25 of the total 38 matches scheduled. The young side learned quickly and returned very keen to introduce the game to the States. Following the tour, NSWAFL patron and Sydney Football Club president Sydney lawyer R.A Munro King sponsored a competition to send an Australian schoolboy to America to help teach Americans Australian rules. The winner, decided based on the student who could give the best lecture on the game, its history and development was a Sydney (Fort Street Public School) schoolboy and surf lifesaving champion Eric Cullen-Ward who received a £200 traveling scholarship for his lecture and returned with the team to San Francisco.

==== New Zealand ====
En route via Tahiti, the Americans visited New Zealand, both north island at Wellington on May 12 where they were asked why they did not play rugby, but trained with local players at the Basin Reserve. An invitation to visit and play against the Auckland Australian Football League was left unfulfilled. The Americans also visited the south island including Invercargill though no football games were organized by the local leagues.

==== New South Wales ====
The Americans arrived in Sydney in July and played against Sydney Public Schools on the 7 July. Their first match was against Sydney combined schools which had won the most recent Australian schoolboys championship. The Sydney tour did not have the desired promotional effect in Sydney with the rugby dominated media, unaware of Australian rules being played in the United States, mistakenly describing them as a touring American football, or rugby team.

Tour Date	Location	Result
7 July 1909	Sydney Cricket Ground, New South Wales	U.S. 6.7 (43) def. by Sydney combined schools 13.15 (93)
11 July 1909	Sydney Cricket Ground, New South Wales	U.S. 2.6 (18) def. by Sydney combined schools 11.18 (84)
12 July 1909	Moore Park, New South Wales	U.S. 20 def Sydney YMCA 8

==== Victoria ====
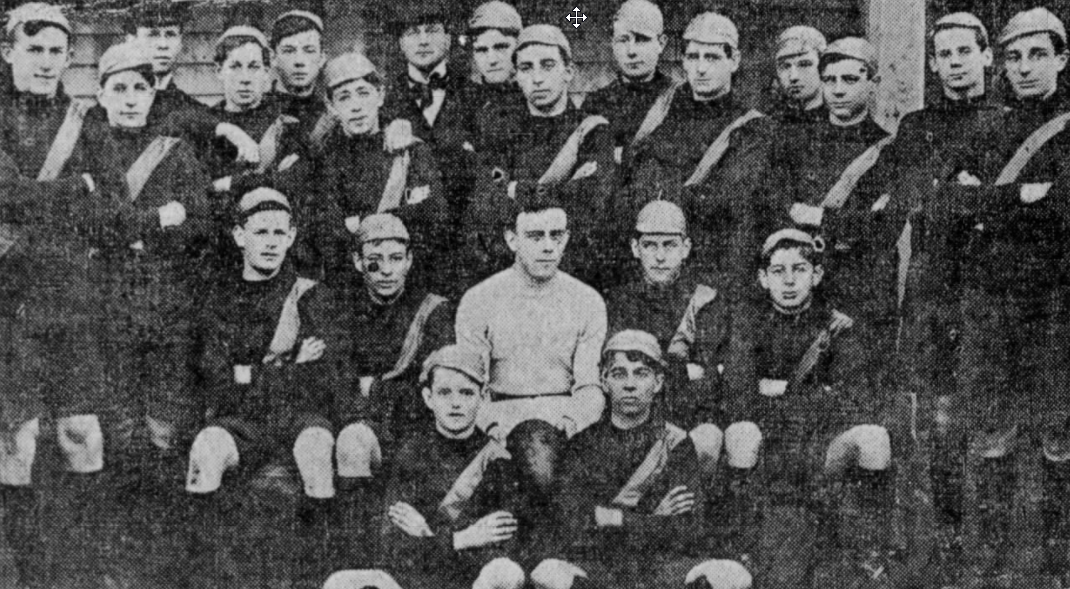
American team in Benalla Victoria August, 1909

En route to Melbourne the Americans were scheduled to visit towns along the way including Goulburn, Wangaratta, Victoria, Benalla and Beechworth to play against local representative sides. They arrived in Melbourne in late July. The tour however was much to the dissatisfaction of the Australasian Football Council's Con Hickey who was refusing to endorse it and warned the Americans not to attempt to engage with the VFA either. The AFC had insisted that touring players stay in Melbourne and affiliate with the AFC and the Victorian Football League. When the visitors arrived in Melbourne the AFC offered a VFL contribution of £70 to the tour, along with a £130 contribution from the South Australian Football League however the AFC revoked this stating the tour was not returning the profits it had expected. Hickey had offered to pay for the return fare to San Francisco, but only if they committed to canceling their West Australian tour. The young players being amateurs, most of them had paid their own way, declined out of respect for the Western Australian hosts. As a result, they weren't able to play against any AFC affiliated league clubs but were able to play against the country clubs and schools.

Tour Date	Location	Result
	Wangaratta, Victoria	U.S. 4.7 (31) def. by Wangaratta 3.7 (33)
	Benalla, Victoria	U.S. 7.13 (55) def Benalla 7.3 (45)
	Beechworth, Victoria	U.S. 7.9 (51) def Beechworth 1.4 (10)
27 July 1909	Melbourne Cricket Ground	U.S. 4.6 (30) def Melbourne north combined schools 0.9 (9)
		U.S. 3.5 (23) def. by Melbourne south combined schools 5.6 (36)
	Christian Brothers	U.S. 7.10 (52) def Christian Brothers 4.3 (27)
	Ballarat, Victoria	U.S. 2.2 (14) def. by Ballarat 4.2 (26)
	Geelong, Victoria	U.S. 14.9 (93) def Geelong 1.2 (26)

The Americans shocked Melbourne with an embarrassing win in front of a sizeable crowd, in which the visitors kept them goal-less. Instead of playing football, the VFL organized for the Americans to watch a VFL match at the Lake Oval between South Melbourne and Fitzroy, this was criticized after the match was marred by melees and the sort of heavy on-field violence that the Americans schools sought to avoid. The VFL's football boycott of the American tour was highly criticized by the West Australian media, accusing the Victorians of being sore losers and putting profits before the promotion of the game.

==== Western Australia ====
The troupe arrived in Fremantle on the TSS Kanowna for the West Australian leg of the tour. The generous interest and media coverage in Western Australia was a stark contrast to the cold receptions received by the Americans in Sydney and Melbourne. In West Australia, they visited areas where Australian rules was very strong including Perth, Fremantle and the Goldfields in September 1909 where they honed their skills against local sides in some and were spectators of West Australian Football League matches. John Simons, WAFA secretary acted as dedicated tour manager. By the time had left Perth, the game hardened outfit were faced with regional teams. The young Americans notched together an impressive strings of successive wins, losing only to the large towns and cities. The skill level, physicality and pace of the Americans shocked many local sides, with several local sides demanding rematches and rally preparing a stronger side, in such cases however the local media would typically only report details when the local side won though a full record of the tour was kept by the organizers.

Tour Date	Location	Result
23 August 1909	Fremantle Oval	U.S. 7.10 (52) def Fremantle 2.2 (14)
25 August 1909	Subiaco Oval, Perth	U.S. 6.6 (42) def. by Perth 12.12 (84)
26 August 1909	Midland Junction	U.S. 8.3 (51) def. by Midland Junction 11.11 (77)
28 August 1909	Bunbury	U.S. 8.11 (59) def. by Bunbury 13.26 (83)
	Collie	U.S. 7.9 (51) def Collie 6.9 (45)
31 August 1909	Collie	USA 6.3 (42) def. by Collie 10.19 (63)
3 September 1909	Narrogin	U.S. 7.10 (52) def Narrogin 3.3 (21)
	Narrogin	U.S. 3.11 (29) def Narrogin 0.4 (4)
	Pingelly	U.S. 7.1 (43) def Pingelly 4.10 (34)
	Beverley	U.S. 3.9 (27) def Beverley 2.5 (17)
9 September 1909	Beverley	U.S. 3.7 (25) def. by Beverley 6.10 (46)
	Northam	U.S. 6.10 (46) def Northam 4.4 (28)
	Toodyay, Western Australia	U.S. 4.5 (29) def. by Newcastle 6.12 (48)
	Southern Cross	U.S. 6.10 (46) def Southern Cross 6.6 (42)
18 September 1909	Coolgardie	U.S. 7.11 (43) def Coolgardie 1.4 (10)
	Christian Brothers, Kalgoorlie	U.S. 5.10 (40) def Christian Brothers 1.1 (7)
	Boulder	U.S. 7.9 (51) def Boulder 5.3 (33)
	Kalgoorlie	U.S. 7.12 (54) def Kalgoorlie 3.4 (22)
	Christian Brothers, Kalgoorlie	U.S. 3.4 (22) def. by Christian Brothers 4.6 (30)

==== South Australia ====
The Americans arrived in Port Adelaide on the Kyarra in October 1909 for the start of their South Australian tour. With the South Australian Football Association aligning with the VFL and the AFC, beyond a lukewarm reception upon the visitors initial arrival, interest and media coverage in Adelaide was virtually nonexistent. Despite this, the Americans won the majority of their matches against the South Australians.

Tour Date	Location	Result
	Port Adelaide	U.S. 14.22 (106) def Port Adelaide 6.6 (42)
	Adelaide	U.S. 7.12 (51) def Adelaide 6.13 (49)
	Peterborough	U.S. 5.8 (38) def Petersburg 1.4 (10)
	Broken Hill	U.S. 6.6 (42) def Broken Hill 2.11 (23)
	Broken Hill	U.S. 0.4 (4) def. by Broken Hill 4.4 (28)
	Port Pirie	U.S. 6.10 (40) def. by Port Pirie 5.11 (41)
	Kadina	U.S. 6.15 (51) def Kadina 3.3 (21)
	Moonta	U.S. 6.12 (48) def Kadina 4.4 (28)

The tourists finally reached Brisbane and Queensland on 19 January 1910, for a rushed, low key visit and were, by that time, too exhausted from the oppressive outback heat to play any further football matches in Australia. The also visited Tasmania before returning to San Francisco on the Makura on January 17, 1910.

=== "Field Ball" takes off in American schools: 1910–1914 ===
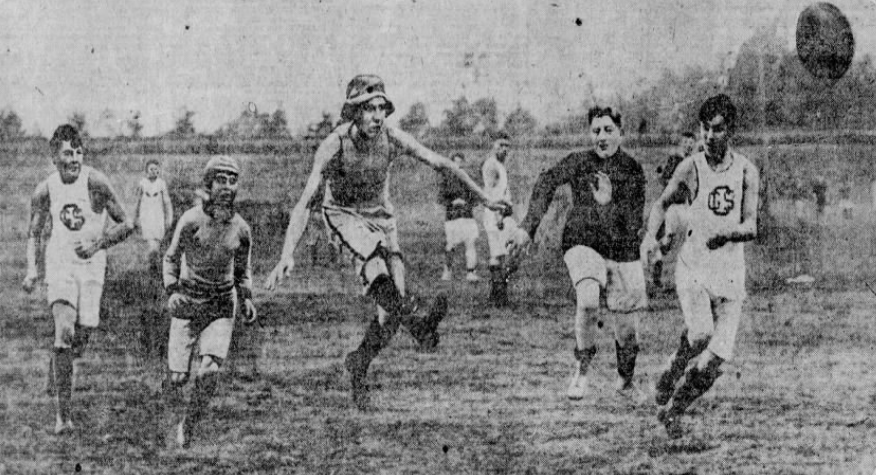
Schools Field Ball match: Crocker Grammar vs. Columbia Park Grammar. August, 1910

The return of Columbia Park boys and the arrival of Cullen-Ward from Sydney who traveled along with them (along with YMCA instructor C.F Martin) helped the game, first known locally as "bouncing football" and "field ball", spread to San Francisco public grammar schools in early-mid 1910. It was one of four football codes to be played including American, Association and Rugby football however the parents at these 35 Californian schools had decided not to permit their children to play either American or Rugby football and Pexiotto was keen to see Australian rules adopted spruiking its key benefits as being safer and more appealing to spectators. Cullen Ward conducted several clinics, including one at Mission High School, Everett Grammar School and Crocker Grammar School. The first game, played at Golden Gate Park, between squads of up to 25 players consisting mostly of rugby players under Australian Rules was promoted among local schools, with many of the local schools invited to watch. After seeing the Australian "Field Ball" (as it was then promoted), an excited Fremont Boys from Riverside expressed interest in starting a team to join a new competition in May, but Pacific Heights Grammar School was the second and regular matches were played between the two schools. Lowell Grammar School and Crocker Grammar later joined the competition with a substantial number of rugby players making the switch. Hancock Grammar school joined in with regular practice against Crocker Grammar.

Reference to Australia in the name was disfavored and grammar schools had decided to call it "Field Ball" in an effort to distance it from rugby and give it more local appeal and the name stuck. Cullen Ward was to go on to teach, coach, play and officiate field ball at several dozen schools across the San Francisco Bay Area, Los Angeles, San Diego, Seattle, Vancouver in June 1911 and went on to coach an All-American team against visiting sides. He married an American in 1912 and intended to settle permanently in California.

Field Ball, now being promoted as "the ideal game for grammar school students" was played by Hancock against Crocker schools in front of a crowd of around 4,000 students A call went out to expatriate Australians familiar with the "Victorian Rules" to help organize senior matches being played under the banner of the Barbarians (Rugby Club). The Hancock side was coached by a teacher of Stockton Grammar School who had been taught by Cullen and also introduced the game there. Roosevelt Grammar School adopted the code later in the year along with Franklin Grammar School.

Chicago and Philadelphia schools were also adopting the code and in 1911 calls were made for Australian coaches to facilitate representative sides. Representatives from the University of California met to formalize governing body for a San Francisco vs. Chicago representative match, to introduce Field Ball into colleges and to send a team to tour Australia. The new body secured a dedicated training and match facility and head office at Ocean Shore grounds. An editorial in the San Francisco Call noted that local school children much preferred Field ball over the American sports and it had become highly popular despite their parents preferring that they play American national sports like American football, Baseball and Basketball. In San Francisco, the league expanded to include Everett Grammar School, Monroe Grammar School and YMCA Oakland (where Australian C.F. Martin had been appointed physical director).

=== Young Australia League tour of North America: 1910–1911 ===
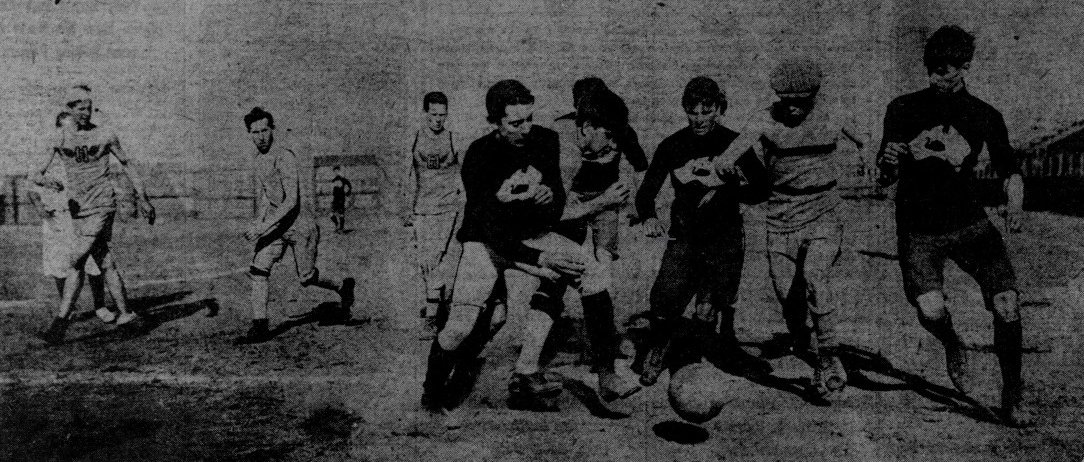
International fieldball: USA Schoolboys vs. Young Australia. Presidio of San Francisco. October 1, 1911

Plans for a Young Australia League reciprocal tour of the U.S. to play against an American side began as early as April 1910, Simons originally proposed that the team be represented by players from all states of Australia, but without support from the Eastern States the proposed interstate quota was dropped to 10. As it became obvious that AFC affiliated states were not coming to the party, a contingency plan was set in place for it to be Western Australia only, consisting of a balance of half city and half country players. In the end an agreement was reached with the governing bodies of the eastern states that the final team would feature 40 West Australians, one South Australian and one Victorian and the touring party was to detour to Adelaide and Melbourne prior to departure at the tour manager's expense to receive the two interstate players.

Three matches with the Young Australian League were set for September at the Presidio of San Francisco Cullen-Ward was appointed head coach of the national team. The Australian team arrived on the Matai. They were received with much fanfare with a full page photo of the Australian team featuring in the papers, along with the local boys captained by Henry Behre. The Australian team guernsey was a variation of the West Australian Black Swan emblem acknowledging the West Australian contribution to the tour but featuring a map of Australia to also acknowledge the national nature of the side, while the American team wore the colors and monogram of the Columbia Park Athletic Club. The match was won 95 to 44 at Lincoln Park in front of a crowd of 5,000 including most of the school children in the city and photos of gameplay were featured in The San Francisco Call. In the second match, the Americans took it up to the Australians with the match decided by just 8 points Australia 9.16 (70) to San Francisco 8.14 (62). The match also stimulated interest in the Australian expatriate community, and a third match was played between a combined residents side and the visitors which the visitors won convincingly 125 to 30. The showcase attracted the attention of The New York Times which featured it in an article "Australian Game of Football is the Best".

Tour Date	Location	Result	Attendance
24 September 1911	Lincoln Park, San Francisco	U.S. 44 def. by Young Australia 95	5,000
24 September 1911	Lincoln Park, San Francisco	U.S. 8.14 (62) def. by Young Australia 9.16 (70)	
24 September 1911	Lincoln Park, San Francisco	San Francisco residents 30 def. by Australia 125	

=== Senior competition established: 1911–1913 ===
Following the success of the Young Australia League tour, four clubs were formed to give maturing students and expatriate men an opportunity to play open age football in a championship competition including a proposed expatriate Australian club with two teams. The game was also played on Stanford University campus with the aim of establishing a club there. On December 5, 1911, the Public Schools Athletic League endorsed Field Ball as an official school sport, establishing an all-schools tournament.

By August 1911, the game was proving so popular that there weren't enough officials to support its growth. Cullen Ward and the Columbia Park Club had departed for Vancouver in Canada where schools had also been taking it up in recent years. En route to Vancouver the party visited Portland, Oregon and played an exhibition match at the University of Oregon. The touring party helped ready Canadian players from Fort Vancouver High School to compete against a touring Young Australian League. This tour was highly successful and plans were begun for a second tour of Australia in 1914, with a request made to the Australasian Football Council for a senior Australian team to tour the U.S.

The popular schools competition in 1913 had grown to 150 boys with new teams including Laguna Honda; State Normal; Washington; Bay View; and James Lick. Many of the original juniors had grown and a colleges team was planning to represent the U.S. in Australian Rules team to tour Australia to play matches against Australian high school teams starting in Perth, Western Australia from June, 1914 however this was later brought forward.

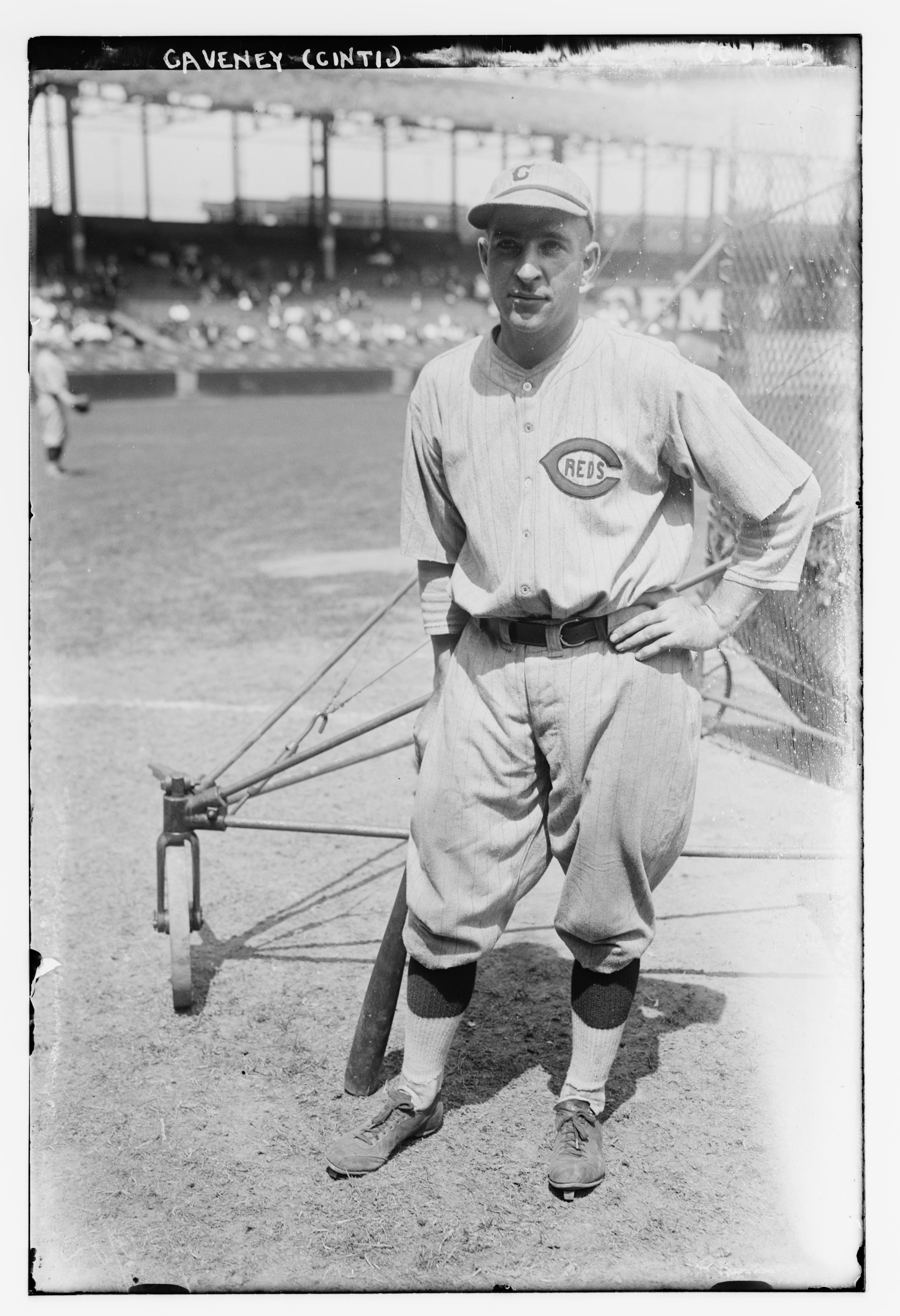
James Caveney was one of the pioneers of American fieldball as both junior player and coach before pursuing a Major League Baseball career in 1914

=== Australia withdraws support & second schoolboys tour: 1913–1914 ===
In 1913, the Americans once again toured with a new group, and had planned a series of around 40 matches, however with funding for only 12 in the touring party, there was not enough of them to field a full team of 22. This time they visited Western Australia, South Australia, Victoria and Tasmania. The Young Australia League once again hosted the American side, however the WAFL, facing backlash from the AFC, began to distance itself from the venture and withdrew financial commitment to the tour. Though media interest for the tour was scant, they did play matches against local sides, including one in Broken Hill, and at Norwood Oval in Adelaide. In November, 1913, they arrived in Melbourne on the Loongana. When asked of how the game in America was faring, the group cited the biggest challenges to its survival being access to fields and funding.

Tour Date	Location	Result
16 July 1913	WACA Ground	Young Australia League 3.1 (19) def U.S. 1.1 (7)

The YAL and Columbia Club began to organise a third tour for 1915 with plans for reciprocal tours every 3 years.

In response to the Americans' 1912 request, a proposal was debated in 1914 by the Australasian Football Council to send a team the U.S., however a decision was deferred until after the war. The council never approved the motion.

The Young Australia League, did send 32 boys to tour the U.S. and Canada in 1915, playing football matches.

=== World War I and third schoolboys tour: 1914–1919 ===
Following news of his father's death Cullen Ward returned to Sydney via the U.S. during the war. O'Dea disappeared completely from the public eye in 1917.

In 1915 Harry Bromley visited America in 1915 to promote the idea of a "national football" code, a hybrid version of Australian football played on American gridiron fields which allowed throwing of the ball. He wished to capitalize on the growing popularity of Gaelic football, Australian football and American football in the States and gained the support of Irish American Athletic Club member James Sullivan to help promote it. However America's entry to the war put an end to the plans.

A third schoolboys tour to Australia was organized in 1919 following the war and managed by E.D Grace, with many of the original team members now of high school age. However except when in Western Australia, Australian Football was now rarely part of the visitors program. In Western Australia, however they defeated a team from the new Northam Senior High School by 3 points, also played a game at Beverley who won by one point and one in Katanning.

=== Recess and revival attempts: 1920–1947 ===
Commentators in Australia however noted that by the 1920s it was in dire trouble with soccer now being adopted by most of the junior schools, it had better access to fields and required less players to hold a match. These were the last reports of it being played both in schools and at senior level.

In 1926 the Australian Football Council's Con Hickey received a letter inviting Australian teams to play test matches against visiting Kerry county football team (Gaelic Football) in California, noting Gaelic Football's growing popularity in the U.S. since the war.

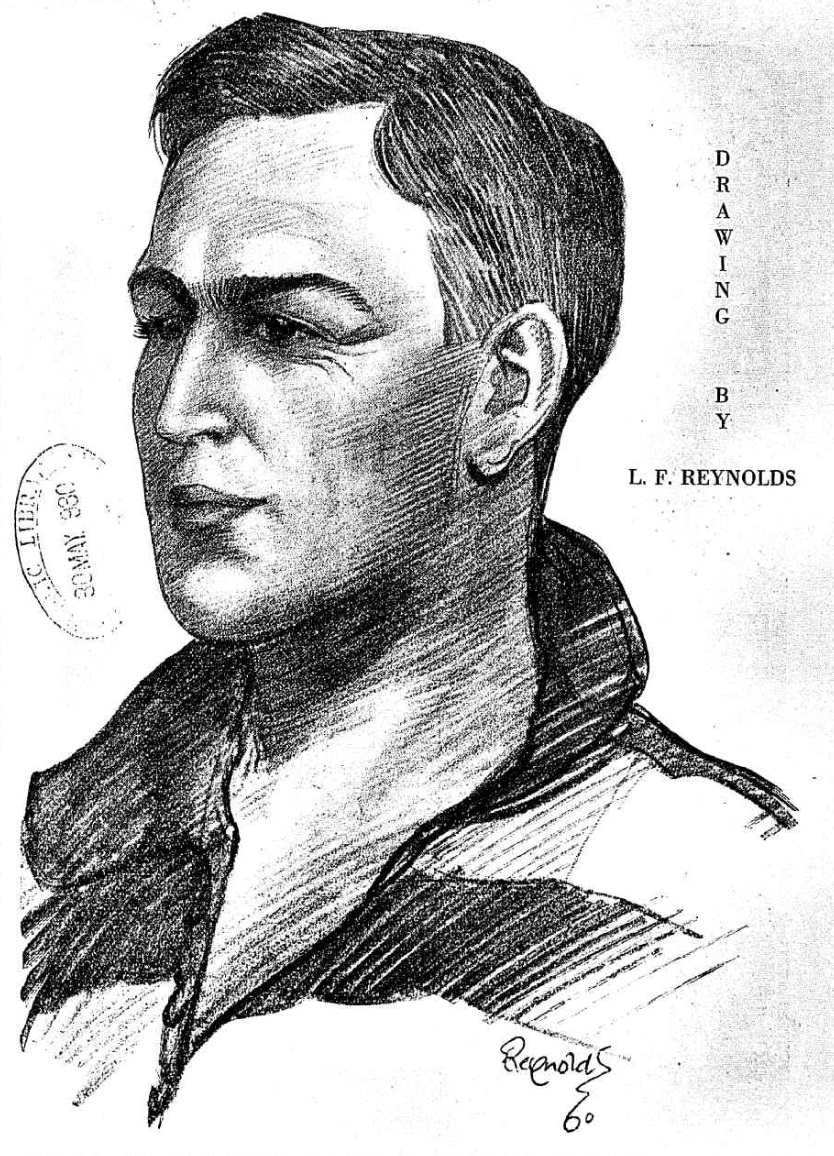
Sketch of Carji Greeves (1930) who attempted to reintroduce the game at Stanford University while coaching American football at UCLA

With growth of American football in the colleges causing rugby popularity to wane, attempting to establish Australian Football in high schools and colleges seemed like a better option. Hopes were pinned on Carji Greeves (1924 Brownlow Medal winner) arrival to California to resurrect it. Greeves was appointed kicking coach at UCLA in 1928. He would study at Stanford University, where he delivered on his promise to coach students there in Australian Rules. However it continued to be confused with rugby and as such did not set down firm roots in the colleges.

Speaking in 1929 on its status, the Australian Football Council's Con Hickey mused that efforts to establish it there had failed but cited Gaelic Football's rapid growth in the U.S. in the 1920s as an example of how Australian Football might one day carve a niche, though reiterated that the council had no interest in promoting it and was sufficiently pleased so long as its popularity continued to grow in Australia.

In 1932, a tour by two Australian teams was proposed supported by former VFL players living in the U.S. including Carji Greeves. The idea was boosted when a touring Young American League in Melbourne commented that it would be ideal for high schools and proposed that the VFL invest in promoting the game. Melbourne Councillor Beaurepaire visiting the USA also urged the Australian Football Council to consider sending teams to America to play either Australian rules or the increasingly popular Gaelic code. Former Port Adelaide player Gordon Inkster also got behind the idea. The VFL, however showed little interest, and the AFC lacked support for the idea and the game faded into obscurity.

In 1934, the Los Angeles Daily News published photos of Geelong and South Melbourne Football Club VFL players flying in a pack marking contest mistakenly labelling it a game of "soccer".

In 1938, a proposal was put to the Australian National Football Council to send teams to California for an exhibition match to stimulate grassroots interest in the game, however Victorian president Bob Rush refused to take the idea seriously citing access to suitable grounds and that he would not endorse funding the venture.

In 1939, the VFL signed on to the Californian Universities International Kicking Competition to be held at Stanford University. However the league caused significant embarrassment when it backed out of their contract blaming the Australian National Football Council for its withdrawal. The VFL had been required to send footballs to UCLA Berkely, but failed to. When the Americans invited the VFA to participate, the ANFC blocked the invitation. Seen as a major opportunity to promote the code in the U.S. instead it left the colleges extremely unsatisfied with the Australian code.

In response to a gridiron exhibition match in Melbourne in 1943, Harry Dyke the president of the Richmond VFL Club proposed a scheme which would coach the Americans in Australian Rules.

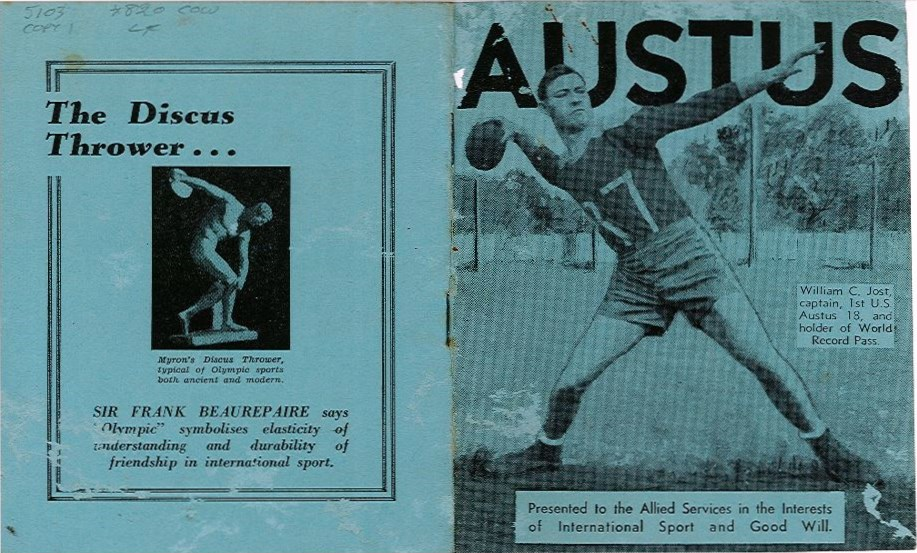
Ern Cowley's Austus sport program in 1943 featuring American serviceman William Jost performing a Forward pass on an Australian Football oval.

In 1943, 40 years after the AFC promoted the hybrid code of Universal Football, Melbourne Sports Globe sports writer Ern Cowley invented the game of Austus, a compromise game between gridiron and Australian rules were played in Australia between servicemen of both countries in the Australian city of Geelong. The visiting Americans were reported to be excited by the Australian game. Despite a series of popular matches which attracted U.S. media attention, and an award for its inventor, the hybrid code did not take off outside of the military.

Date	Location	Result	Attendance
1943, 18 July	Punt Road Oval	Australian Explosives Factory 5.8 (38) def by U.S. Marines 8.4 (52)	
1943, 2 August	Punt Road Oval	Victorian Football League 17.23 (125) def US Marines 8.1 (49)	Archival footage: Video on YouTube
		U.S. marines 69 def Geelong 38	40,000
		U.S. marines 115 def Australian All-Stars 78	6,000
		U.S. marines 75 def Australian Army 52	8,000

=== Push into the colleges and proposed tour: 1948–1959 ===
A major shift in attitude from the governing body in Australia occurred under the West Australian presidency of Wally Stooke. In 1948 when Carl K. Dellmuth, Director of Athletics and Physical Education at Swarthmore College in Pennsylvania after seen the game in Melbourne requested assistance from the governing body to introduce it to colleges citing the spectator appeal, the transferrable skills and the low entry cost of equipment. He succeeded in starting teams in his college. and in gaining cooperation from the Australian Football Council which responded by sending footballs, rule books and a wealth of promotional items. NSW association and AFC secretary K. G. Ferguson extolled that with its introduction into the college system the United States would be capable of sending a national team to Australia within 5 years. The AFC debated sending a touring side for an exhibition match at its national conference in Adelaide. Once again, Western Australia was in support of the idea and had formalized plans to send teams and budgeted £40,000 for the initiative to send a squad of 50 players consisting of contributions from all states (though with the majority of non-Victorians from West and South Australia). For the first time in decades, South Australia also voted in favor, however they could not garner the support of the VFL and other states so opted not to. This was not helped by the media in Australia which argued that it was destined to fail and that the league was better of spending the money at home. As a result of the lack of support from Australia, the proposed Swarthmore College - Haverford College clash was first postponed to 1949, then never went ahead. Enthusiasm in American colleges soon waned.

In the 1950s, the AFC's focus would increasingly shift toward to the idea of touring teams playing Gaelic Football in New York instead, due partly to the growth of the Gaelic code there, but also due primarily to the available fields and reduced investment of sending a much smaller side. The idea of a US tour was revived by council members in 1954 but with a reduction in the size of the playing lists to 14 to reduce costs. This idea eventually manifest into the Australian Football World Tour with a focus on capitalizing on Gaelic Football's growth in the U.S.

=== First VFL exhibition matches and Australian football world tour: 1960–1978 ===
From the 1960s, having negotiated its first television broadcast rights the VFL and its clubs began to take an interest in the U.S. as a means of further growing its audience (even a small television audience in the U.S. could have been worth more than the league made out of the entire state of Victoria). Both Melbourne and Geelong had taken an interest in the American market and in 1963 the first VFL exhibition games were played in major U.S. cities to test its potential international audience. The matches were very low key and were not successful in terms of attention or publicity.

Date	Location	Stadium	Teams/Score	Crowd
Oct. 20, 1963	Honolulu	Honolulu Stadium	Geelong 15.21 (111) v Melbourne 17.21 (123)	1,500
Oct. 26, 1963	San Francisco	Kezar Stadium	Geelong 9.12 (66) v Melbourne 10.11 (71)	3,500

On October 27, Geelong also played an extra intraclub exhibition match at "Big Rec" Golden Gate Park.

In 1965, former Victorian Football League player Colin Ridgeway was recruited by the Dallas Cowboys and played a total of 3 games as a punter. Although he was the first Australian to make such a transition he did not have much of an impact in the NFL.

The Australian Football World Tour visited New York on Sunday, 5 November 1967 with the Australian Galahs playing International Rules at Gaelic Park against the New York GAA at Gaelic Park, New York City. The Galahs lost the match 4-8 (20) to 0-5 (5), the visitors not managing a score after half time. There were many brawls during the match, with the Galahs coming off second best in all of them. Hassa Mann, sucker punched behind the play, had his jaw broken in three places. Playing coach Ron Barassi had his nose broken by a giant New York narcotics detective (Brendan Tumulty), who broke his own thumb in the process of hitting Barassi. An exhibition match of Australian Football was played in addition to Gaelic Football.

=== Television, ESPN and the AFL: 1979–1990 ===
Television was the biggest breakthrough for Australian football in the United States. In late 1979, the brand new ESPN cable network signed its first international TV contract with the Victorian Football League (in 1990, it became the Australian Football League). Coverage began with the 1980 season with matches airing on late Friday and Saturday nights, sometimes live but usually one or two week tape delayed to up to 2.5 million subscribers. At the time, reports indicated ESPN paid the VFL nearly $100,000 (the VFL's Australian TV rights deal at the time was just $600,000). The 1983 VFL Grand Final was the first time in history that the Grand Final was broadcast live into the U.S. The VFL wasn't the only Australian rules on American screens. The South Australian National Football League also had a broadcast rights deal with American cable television and by 1984 was attracting around 40 million viewers to its weekly 1 hour highlights segment.

VFL coverage continued on ESPN until 1986, when it was dropped. This exposure on ESPN is credited with creating a generation of fans in the United States (and providing the foundation for the formation of AFANA and the USAFL in 1996). The founding of AFANA led to the first organized fan group outside Australia and lobbying for television coverage was part of the efforts to grow it from the beginning. The core of the initial players for the USAFL included many who first saw the matches on ESPN a decade or more earlier.

In 1987 an ambitious $10 million proposal from Perth magnate Errol Marron was put forward for a VFL expansion club based partly in Los Angeles named the Los Angeles Crocodiles with profits from increased television rights to fund a local league. Stadiums in the proposal included the Los Angeles Memorial Coliseum. In October 1987 Ross Oakley announced that the VFL had rejected the bid.

Despite the rejected bid, the VFL showed a renewed interest in rekindling its U.S. broadcast deal and scheduled more exhibition matches to grow the audience. The locations played at were largely the product of the available venues more than anything. VFL and club promoters hyped their predictions of the crowds of more than 20,000, sending star players Darren Millane and Damian Bourke to promote the games, however the final attendance and interest fell way short of expectations. It wasn't until the league rebranded as the national AFL in 1990 and featured capital city branded teams from the Australian East and West coast that the league attracted a respectable attendance and interest.

Date	Location	Stadium	Teams/Score	Crowd
Oct. 8, 1988	Miami, Florida	Joe Robbie Stadium	Collingwood 18.16 (124) v Geelong 10.18 (78)	7,500
Oct. 14, 1989	Miami, Florida	Joe Robbie Stadium	Essendon 18.16 (124) v Hawthorn 15.20 (110)	10,069
Oct. 12, 1990	Portland, Oregon	Civic Stadium	Melbourne 24.16 (160) v West Coast 11.13 (79)	14,787

The first American born player in the AFL, Don Pyke (who moved to Western Australia in his youth) debuted for the West Coast Eagles in 1989 and later that year, the first African-American born player Sanford Wheeler debuted for the Sydney Swans. However, despite the investment into the market and the birth of the national AFL competition no U.S. TV deal was forthcoming.

=== Punt into America: 1991–1995 ===
In 1995, Darren Bennett – former Melbourne Football Club player was recruited by the San Diego Chargers. He went on to become one of the most successful punters in the history of the NFL. His popularity as an ex-Australian also considerably increased the awareness of Australian Rules in the U.S., as excerpts of him kicking goals in the AFL were sometimes shown on American television. Since Bennett, other Australian rules players have followed, having a small effect of exposing the Australian game to Americans.

Against the flow, Essendon Football Club coach Kevin Sheedy enticed former Oakland Raiders National Football League player Dwayne Armstrong to switch codes to Australian rules. The experiment was largely unsuccessful, with Armstrong not debuting at senior level, but nevertheless created media interest in Australia about the possibility of American athletes playing the Australian game.

=== U.S. local games and National League: 1996–1998 ===
The first match between two local U.S. clubs was played in 1996 between Cincinnati and Louisville. In the first year the Mid American Australian Football League was formed. Many of the local players had found out about the game in the 1980s on television and ESPN. Although the local game grew, ESPN no longer broadcast AFL matches, and in response the lobby group AFANA was formed.

In 1997, the first club national championships were held in Cincinnati. Nashville hosted the first Australian Grand Final Festival in the same year. The United States Australian Football League (USAFL) was formed in 1997 to govern the code in the country.

In the early years prior to affiliating with the AFL, the USAFL chose to brand the game as "Footy" to differentiate it from rugby and was the governing body promoted itself by the informal name "US Footy", this is what many players and the media also refer to it as.

=== Steady growth: 1999–2015 ===
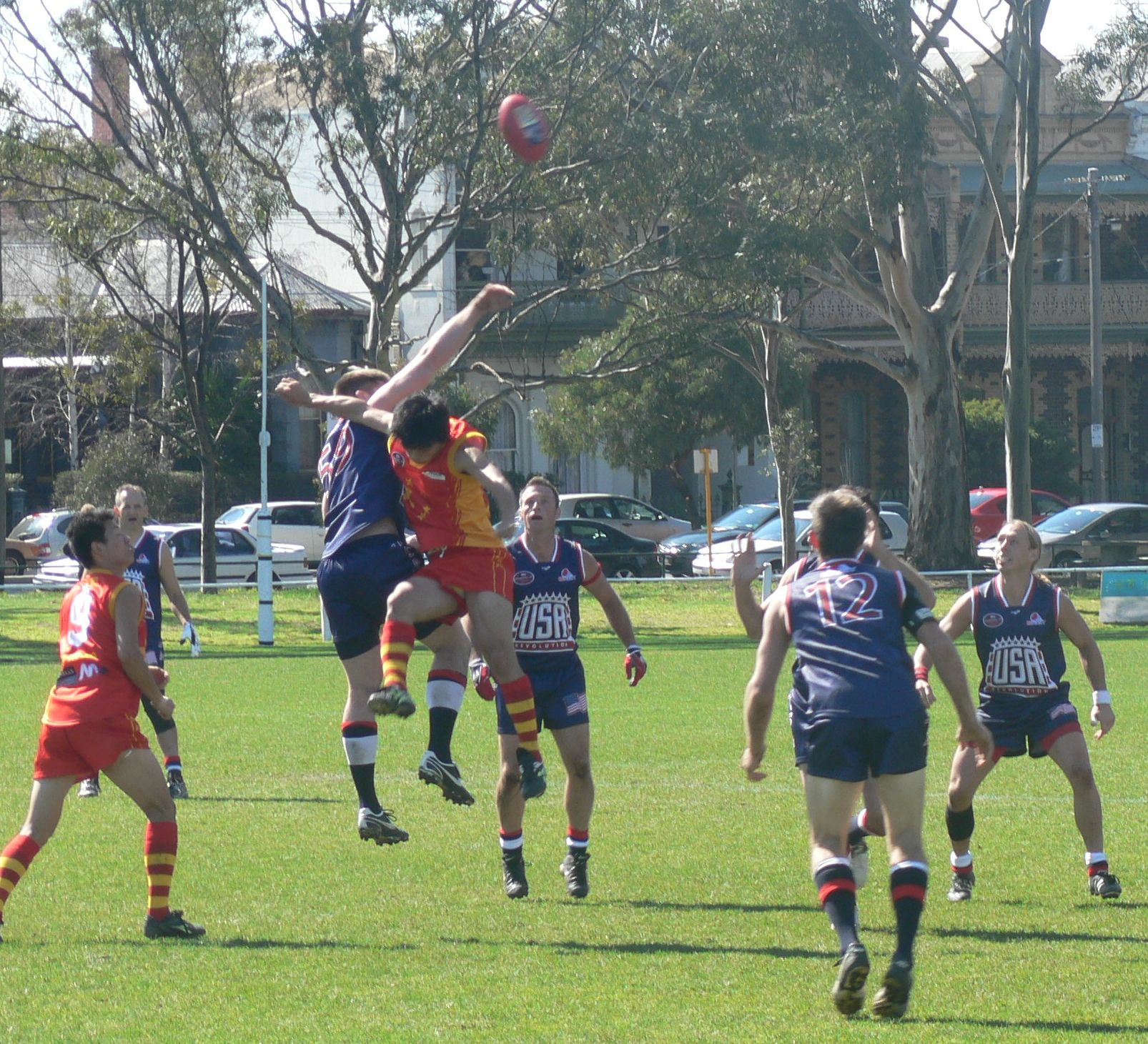
Action from U.S. vs China International Cup match in 2008

A national team, the Revolution, formed in 1999 to compete in a European event, the Atlantic Alliance Cup, before concentrating on events closer to home. The U.S. turned to competing against Canada in the 49th Parallel Cup and was for a time coached by AFL legend Paul Roos. This Cup is an annual and keenly contested international event which both countries use as a guide to their progress and as preparation for the International Cup, the world cup of Australian Football.

In the same year, a record crowd of 1,000 attended an MAAFL match between the Nashville Kangaroos and Chicago Swans at Nashville in Tennessee.

In 1999, the first U.S. college Australian rules football clubs formed in North Carolina when the UNC-Chapel Hill club is organized in the spring semester and the NC State club is established the following fall. These two clubs established a rivalry that lasted for over a decade.

In 2001, the first college Australian rules football club outside of North Carolina began at Vanderbilt University. In the following years, several new clubs emerged in universities across the state, many of them affiliated with USAFL clubs.

The Revolution competed in the 2002 Australian Football International Cup with an All-American side and finished fifth out of eleven countries.

In 2002, the Australian Football League began to recognize the potential of the U.S. as a pool of talent and began providing a small amount of international funding to the USAFL. An offshoot was the US Footy Kids junior program, with strong similarities to AFL Auskick. The Australian Defence Force formed a relationship with the USAFL for Australian personnel on US postings to help make up the 30% of Australians allowed for a USAFL roster.

In 2003, clear weather at a Nashville home game against the St. Louis Blues and Kangaroos saw the match set a new league crowd record.

In 2004, Vanderbilt University hosted the first US College Invitational. This tournament was held in Nashville and was attended by representatives of Arizona State University, Belmont University, Middle Tennessee State University, North Carolina State University, University of Missouri - Kansas City, University of North Carolina - Chapel Hill, and Vanderbilty University. The Tar Heels of UNC were crowned the first US College Invitational Champions.

In 2005, the Revolution attended the 2005 International Cup finishing third out of ten countries.

In 2005, the USAFL struck a deal with the ASTN television station for rights to the game, however although the station has filmed local matches, they have not been televised.

Also in that year former Geelong Football Club player Ben Graham joined the New York Jets, bringing media exposure for the Australian sport. On a multimillion-dollar NFL contract, Graham joined with the local New York Magpies club in fundraising activities.

In January 2006, an AFL promotional pre-season match was played in Los Angeles at UCLA between the Kangaroos and league premiers the Sydney Swans, it attracted a crowd of 3,200.

Jan. 15, 2006	Los Angeles	Intramural Field, UCLA	North Melbourne 13.8 (86) v Sydney 6.2 (38)	3,200

Saverio Rocca debuted in the NFL in 2007 as a punter, bringing media exposure for the Australian game.

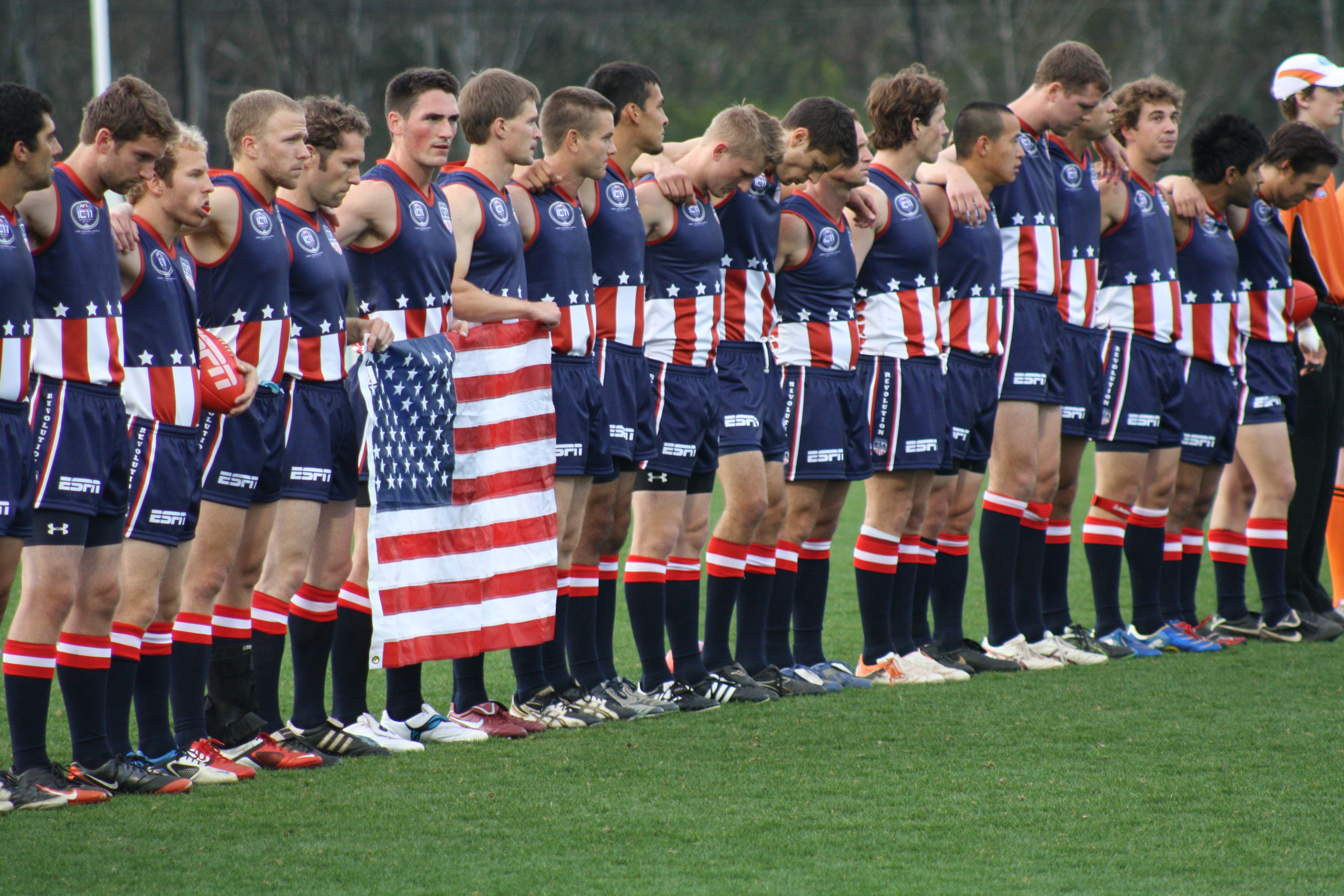
The USA Revolution at the 2011 Australian Football International Cup

Kevin Sheedy and Stephen Silvagni visited in 2007 on a tour of North America as AFL ambassador, attending the USAFL Nationals.

In 2008, a second US College Invitational was hosted by Vanderbilt University. St. John's University at Minnesota were winners, with UNC-Chapel Hill as runner-up, and Vanderbilt University placing third. These were the only three sides attending the tournament.

In 2014, the USAFL organized a collegiate tournament in Texas featuring only Texas colleges. Teams representing Texas A&M, Texas Tech, University of Houston, and University of Texas-Austin took part in the event. Texas A&M and Texas Tech both won two matches and drew the game between them. Texas Tech had the better percentage on the day.

=== Mason Cox era: 2016–present ===
In 2016 former Texan basketball player Mason Cox, known literally as the biggest in the game, made a spectacular AFL debut and in the Anzac Day match in front of 80,000 fans asserted dominance within the first 80 seconds of the match, taking his first mark and with it scoring the game's first goal with his first kick in the AFL. He instantly became America's most notable export in the game and captured the imagination of the Australian sporting public earning the nickname "Coxzilla" for his on field and off-field presence. The big American's impact on the Australian sport could not be understated, with visiting celebrities including president to be Joe Biden in 2016 and Tiger Woods in 2019 meeting with the home grown product and with ESPN increasing its coverage in response. Cox played in a losing AFL Grand Final in 2018. Cox has received more media attention in the United States than almost any other AFL player and has expressed a keen interest in promoting the game at the grassroots in the U.S., visiting the U.S. to support his brother Nolan Cox who played for the Austin Crows in back to back USAFL National Championships.

Exposure generated by Cox increased media interest from American broadcasters and celebrities. In particular Conan O'Brien in 2019 featured a segment featuring the Sydney Swans with Conan learning how to play the game on his popular show which was viewed by millions. Former American football player Pat McAfee announced a new found passion for Australian rules during the COVID pandemic in 2020, interviewing Mason Cox on his popular channel and adopting Mason Cox's club Collingwood as a supporter.

In 2020 the AFL signed a broadcasting rights deal with ESPN via ESPN2 and ESPN3. The move was a big hit. In 2022 American streaming companies Amazon, Paramount+ and YouTube expressed interest in bidding for the U.S. broadcasting rights for the AFL beyond 2024.

In April 2023, Mason Cox appeared in a 60 minutes interview in the United States which was watched by millions. In the interview, Cox explained how sections of the Collingwood crowd would chant "USA USA" whenever he had possession of the ball.

== Players ==
Players with connections to the United States
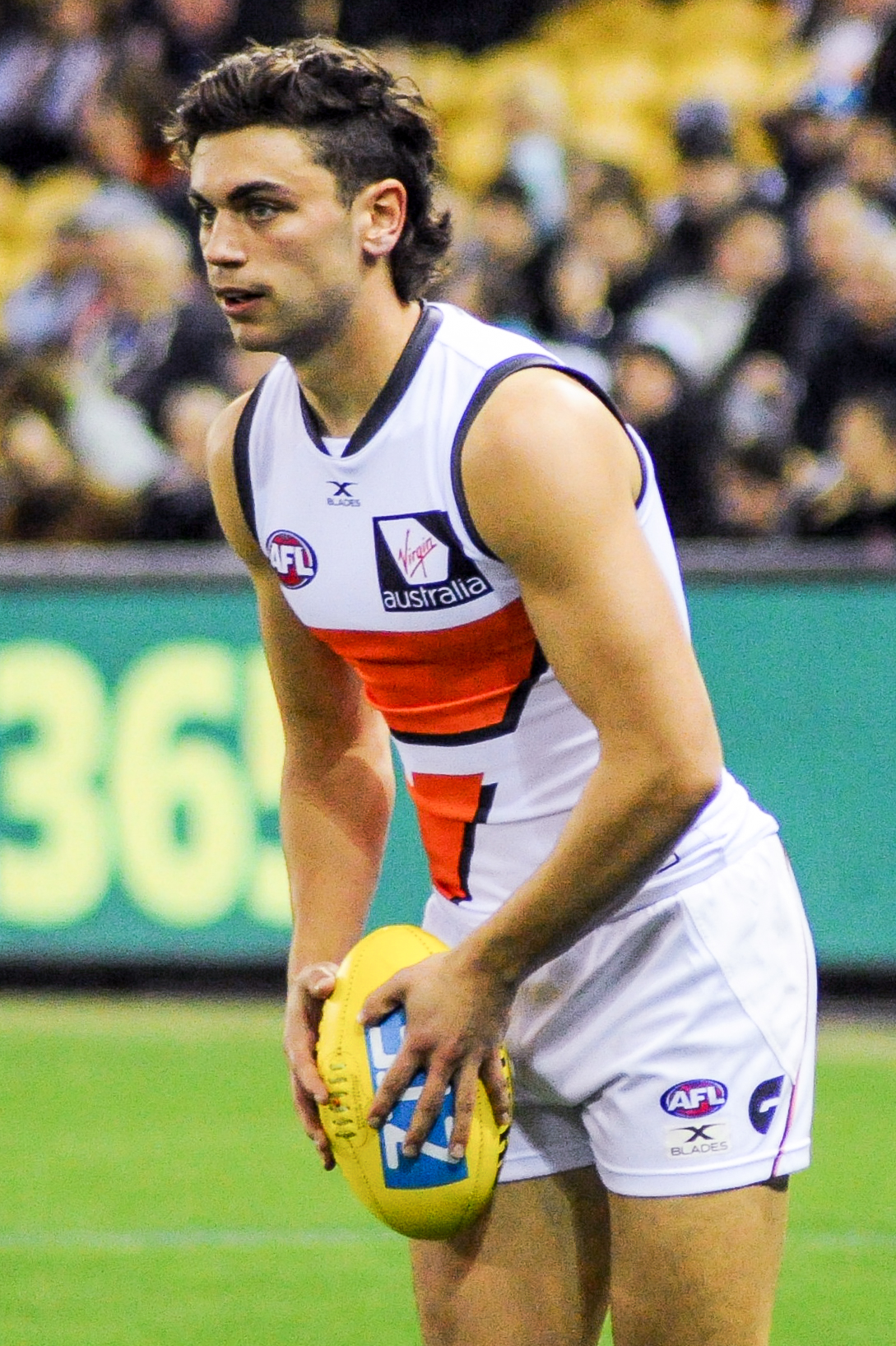
Tim Taranto playing for the Giants in 2017

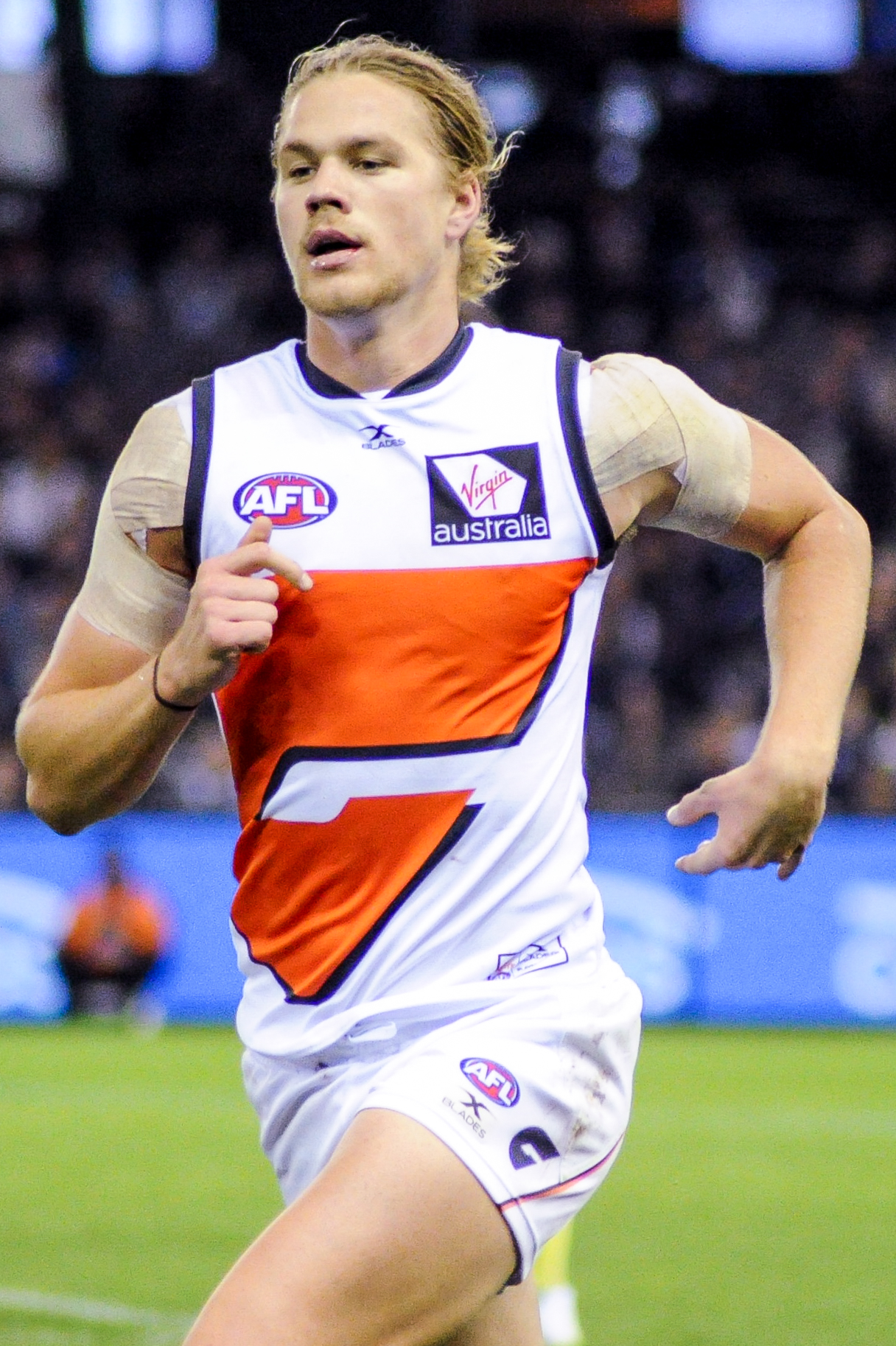
Harry Himmelberg in 2017 as 6 ft 4 in (194 cm) Giants forward

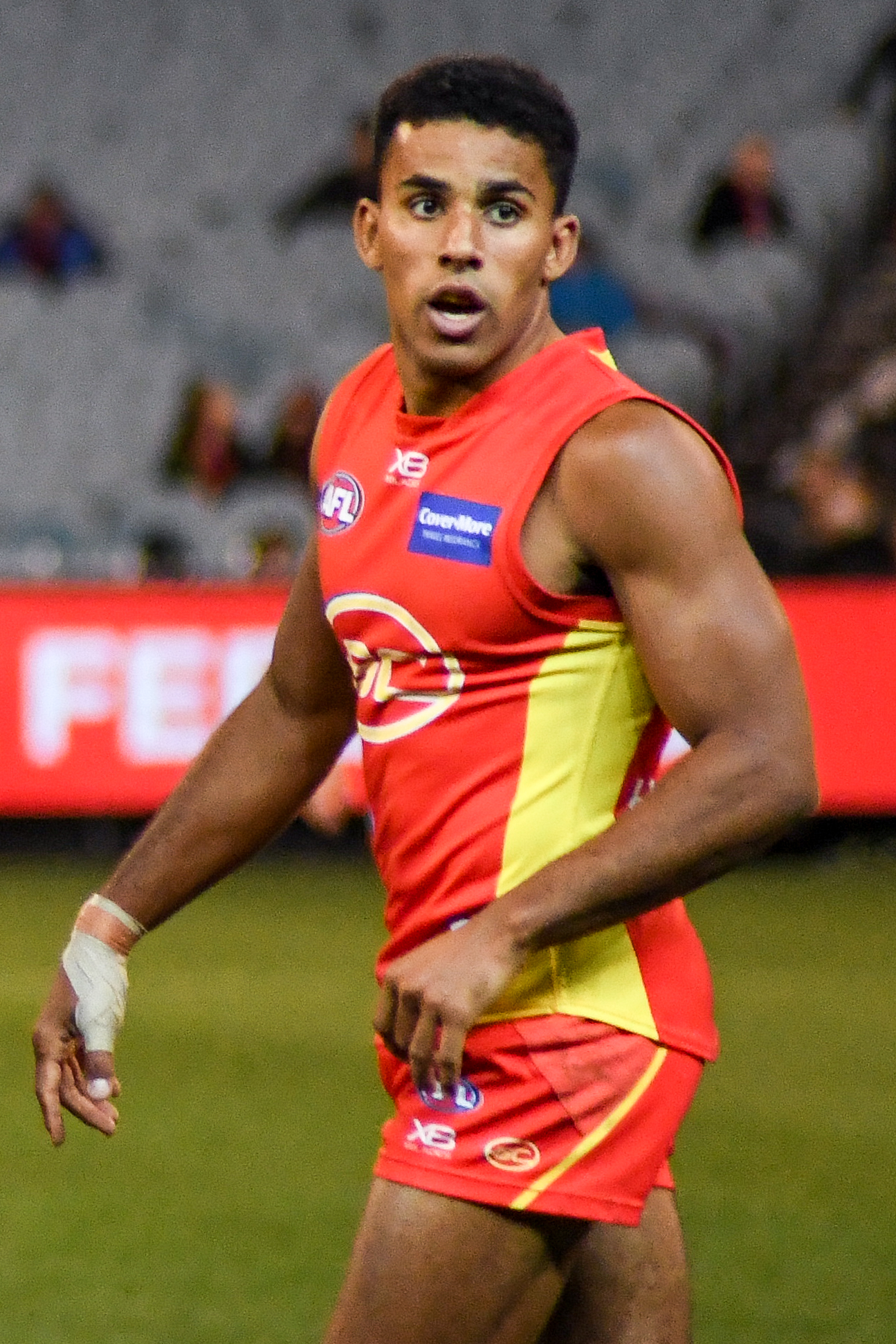
Touk Miller All-Australian and captain for the Gold Coast Suns

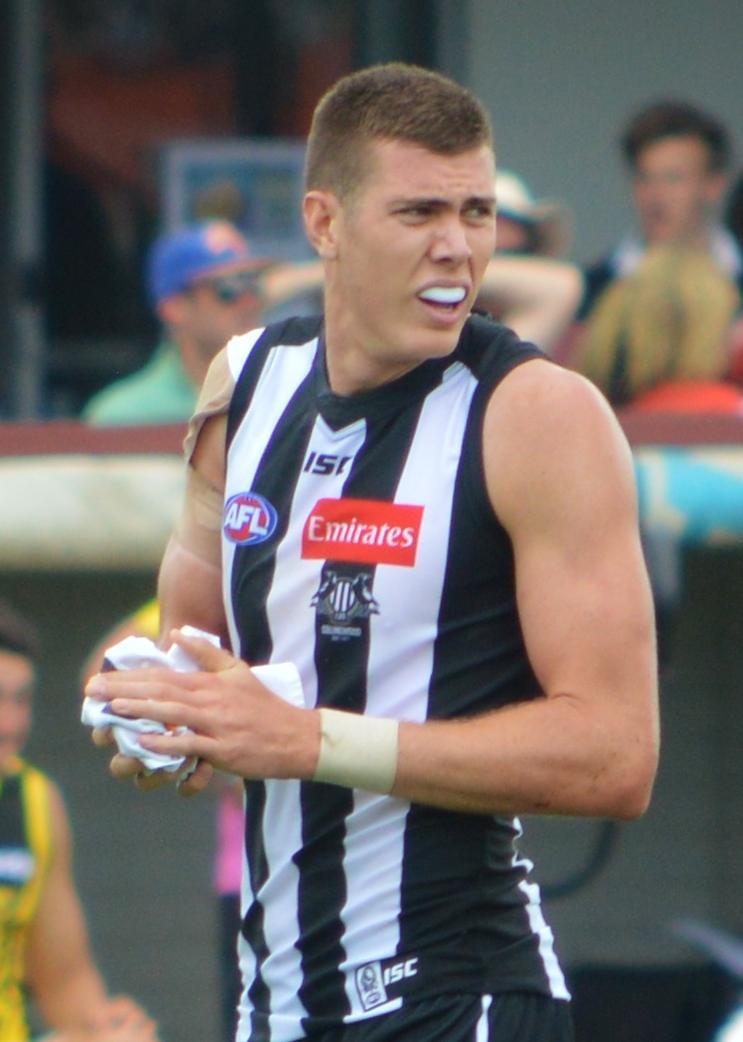
Mason Cox in 2017 as 6 ft 11 in (211.5 cm) Collingwood ruck/forward Texas born and raised to the age of 23

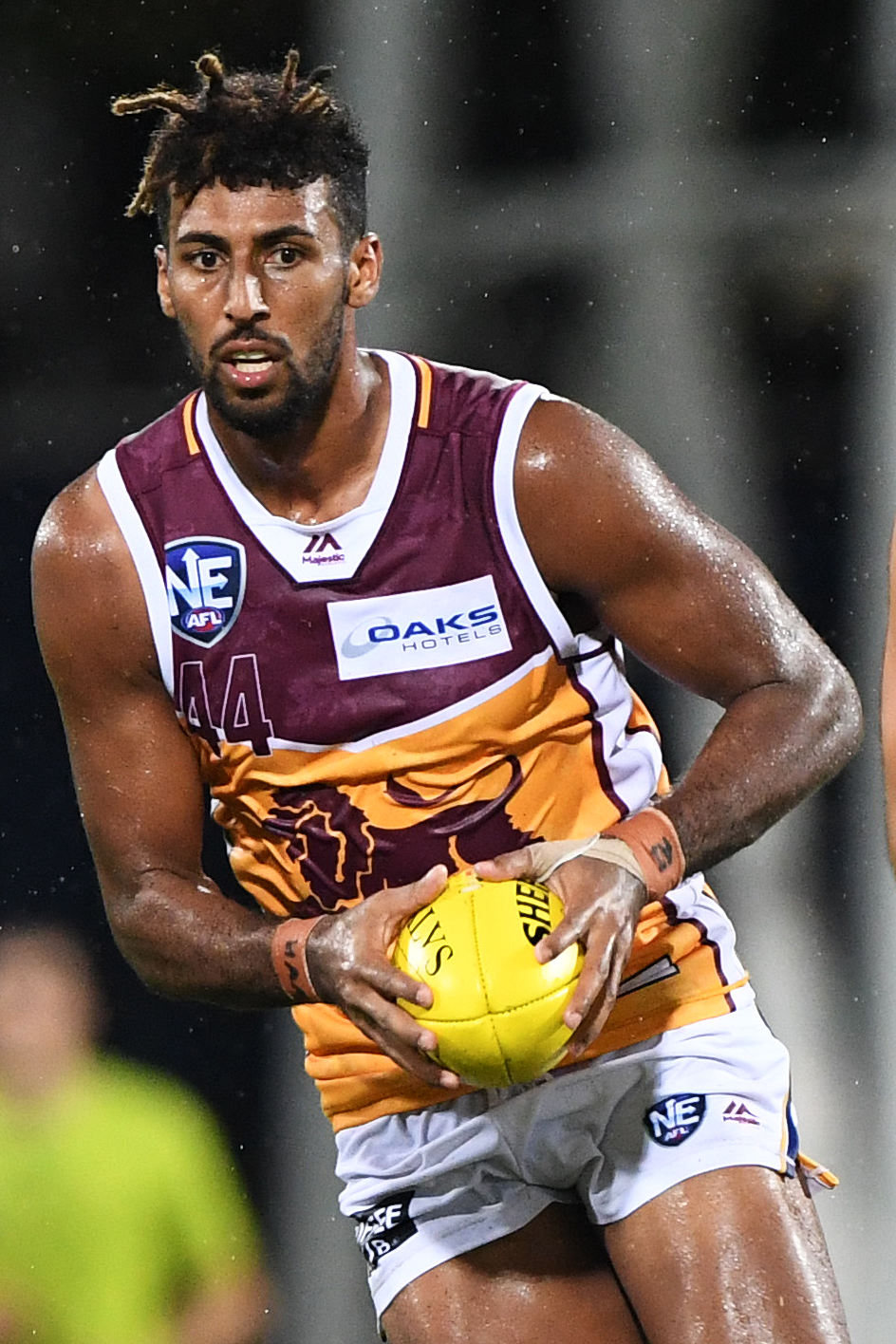
Archie Smith in 2019 as 6 ft 8 in (202 cm) Brisbane Lions ruck is the son of NBA basketball player Andre Moore

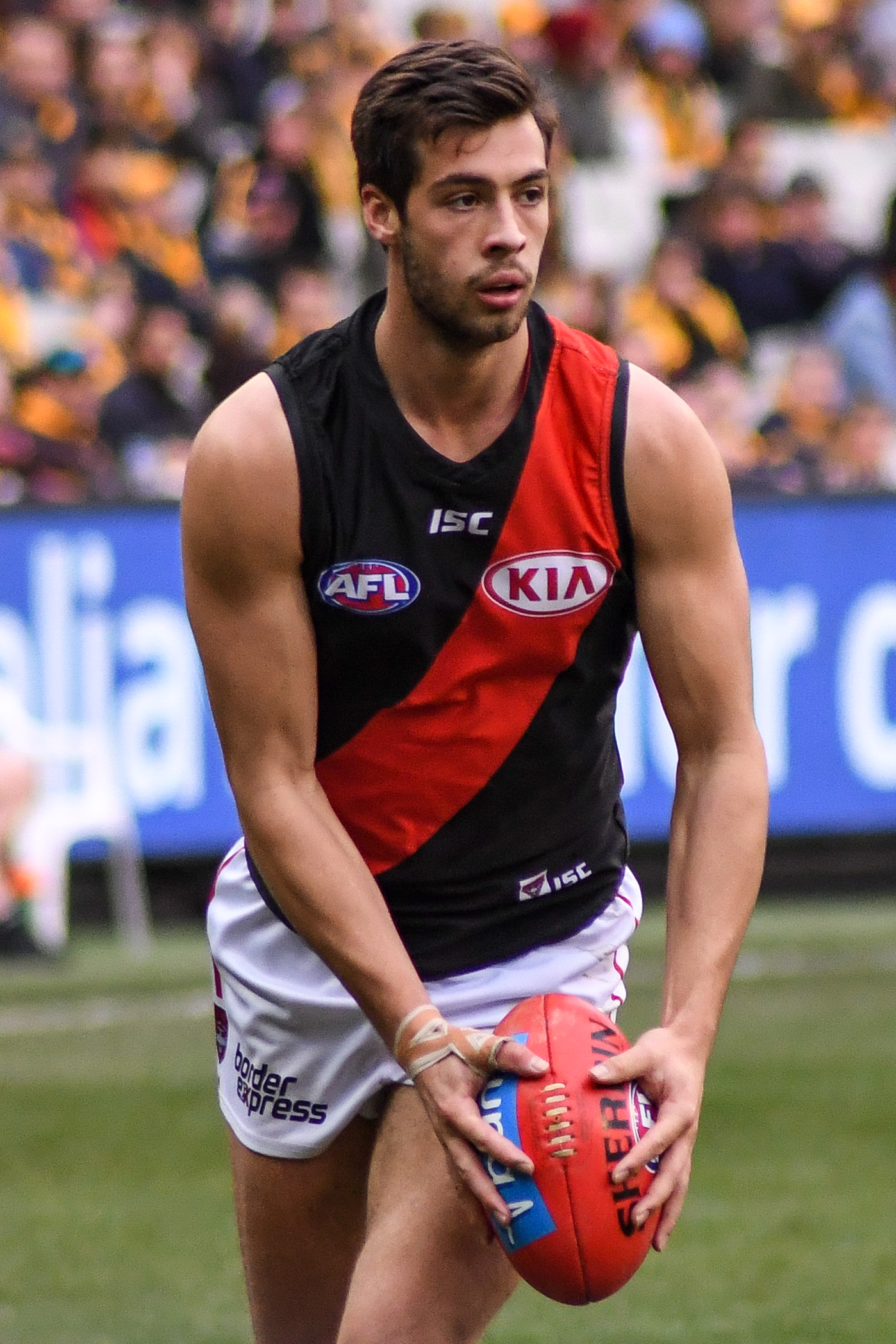
Kyle Langford in 2018 playing for Essendon

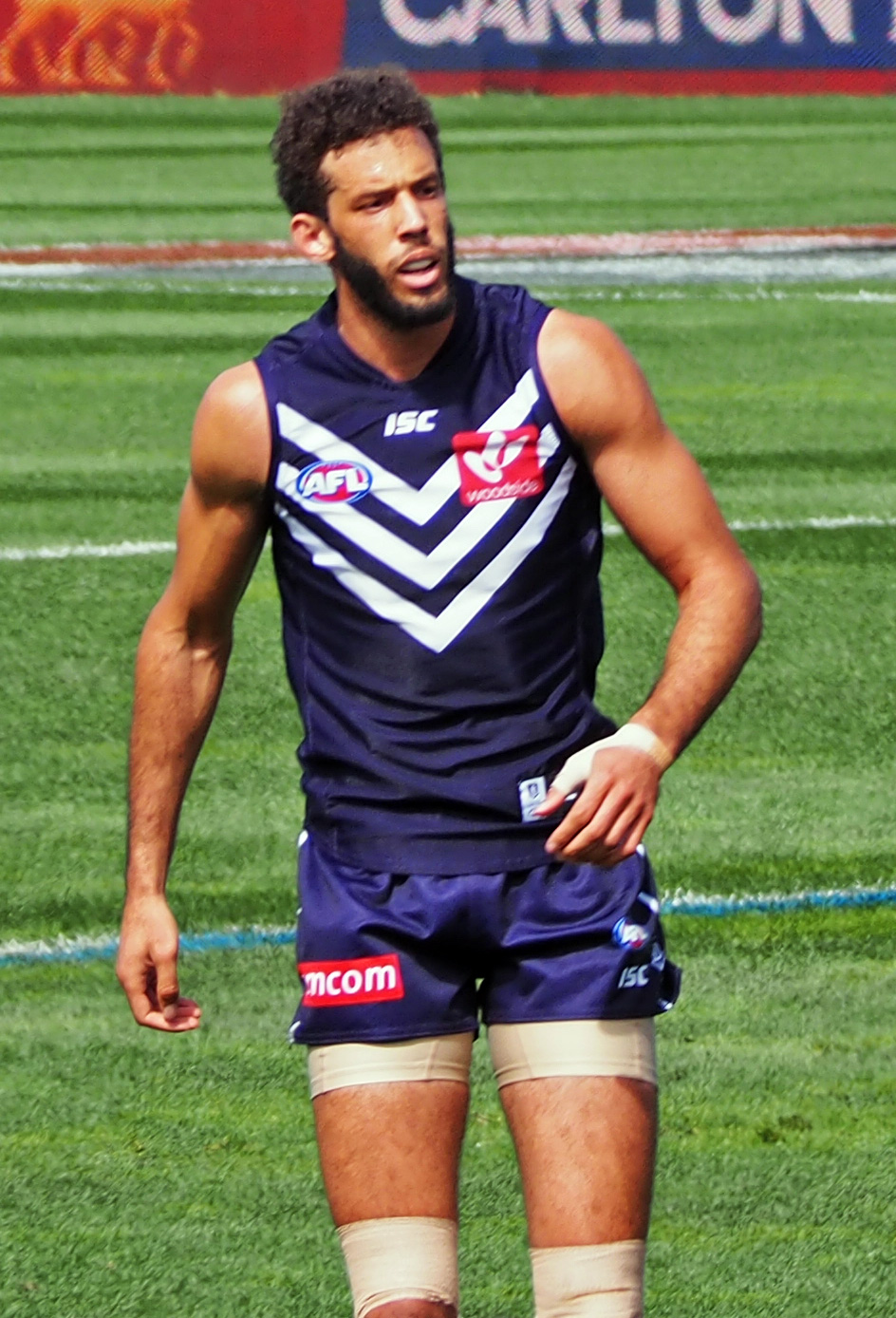
Zac Clarke in 2015 as 6 ft 8 in (203 cm) Fremantle ruck

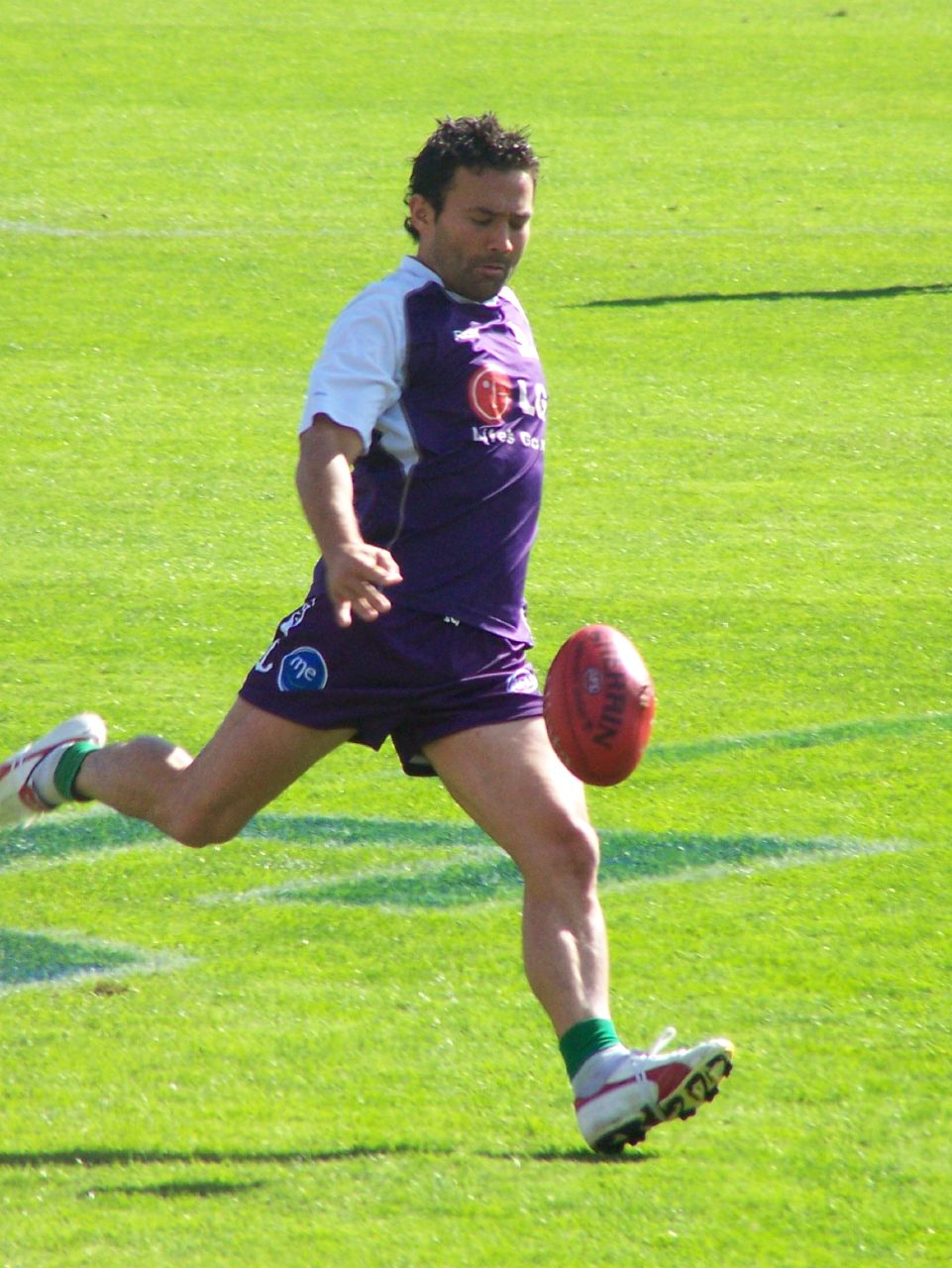
Peter Bell in 2006 as 5 ft 9 in (175 cm) Fremantle captain

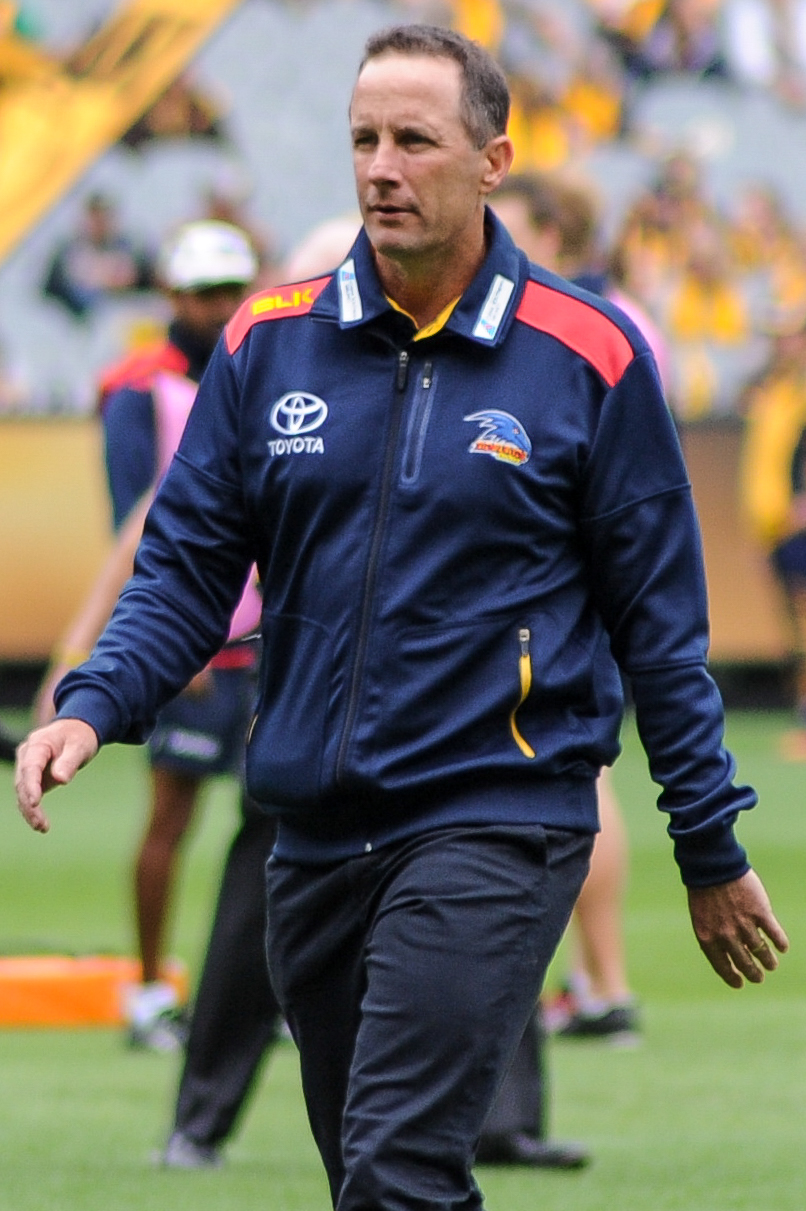
Don Pyke in 2017 as senior coach of the Adelaide, U.S. born games record holder and first U.S. born AFL premiership player

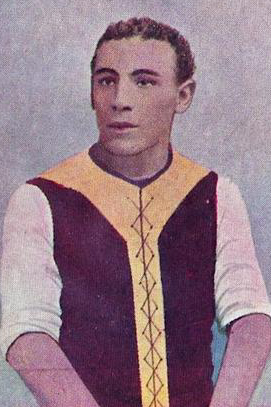
Tom Banks depicted in 1905

Currently on an AFL senior or rookie list

Player	Connection to United States	AFL Years*	AFL Matches*	AFL Goals*	Notes
Brodie Kemp	Parent	2022–	23	1	
Elliott Himmelberg	Father	2018–	41	41	American family from New York
Tim Taranto	Father	2017–	137	67	American family from Texas
Conor Nash	Parent	2017–	73	16	
Harry Himmelberg	Father, lived in New York	2016–	152	161	Also spent some of his childhood living in New York City with his father
Brandon Kaufman	Born and raised to U.S. parents	2016–2017	-		Former NFL wide receiver from Colorado contracted as international rookie for Gold Coast Suns Played for USAFL club Denver Bulldogs on return to the U.S.
Touk Miller	Father(African-American)	2015–	173	51	American family from Ohio
Kyle Langford	Parent	2015–	130	128	
Mason Cox	Born and raised in Highland Village, Texas to age of 23 by U.S. parents	2015–	113	117	Former NCAA Division I basketball player, taken #60 Rookie 2014 by Collingwood Football Club. American family from Texas
Matt Korcheck	Born and raised in U.S.	2015–2017	-		Former Arizona Wildcats basketball player taken #37 Rookie 2015 by the Carlton Football Club. from Tucson, Arizona
Archie Smith	Father (African-American)	2014–2021	16	4	Son of NBA basketball player Andre Moore
Jason Holmes	Born and raised in Chicago to U.S. parents	2014–2017	5	0	Former NCAA Division I basketball player taken #36 Rookie 2013 by St Kilda Football Club.
Patrick Mitchell	Born and raised to age of 24 by U.S. parents	2013–2014	-		Former NCAA Division I basketball player with University of North Dakota taken #45 Rookie 2013 by Sydney Swans. From Des Moines, Iowa
Alex Starling	Born and raised in Miami to U.S. parents	2012–2014	-		Former NCAA Division I basketball player, recruited on Sydney Swans International scholarship, turned down an offer from Port Adelaide Power to play basketball with the NBL1 Central
Eric Wallace	Born and raised to U.S. parents	2012–2015	-		Former NCAA Division I basketball player, recruited on North Melbourne Football Club International scholarship, played VFL, went on to become tight end at Carolina Panthers (NFL)
Shae McNamara	Born and raised in Milwaukee to U.S. parents	2010–2012	-		Former NCAA Division I basketball player, taken #47 Rookie 2009 by Collingwood Football Club in VFL (AFL reserves) and pre-season competition
Zac Clarke	Father (African-American)	2009–2019	110	46	Former NBL1 South basketball player
Dwayne Armstrong	Born and raised to U.S. parents	1996–1997	-		Former NFL practice squad player recruited by Essendon Football Club, played at reserves (VFL) level
Peter Bell	Father (Indigenous American Navajo)	1995–2008	286	250	Australian Football Hall of Famer
Sanford Wheeler	Born, African-American mother	1989–1994	43	7	Moved to Australia at age 5, played with the Sydney Swans. Died 2020. Debuted in Round 6, 1989
Don Pyke	Born, to Australian parents	1989–1996	132	97	Moved to Australia at age 4, played with the West Coast Eagles, 2 time AFL Premiership player. Debuted in Round 1, 1989
Tom Banks	Father (African-American)	1897	8	0	

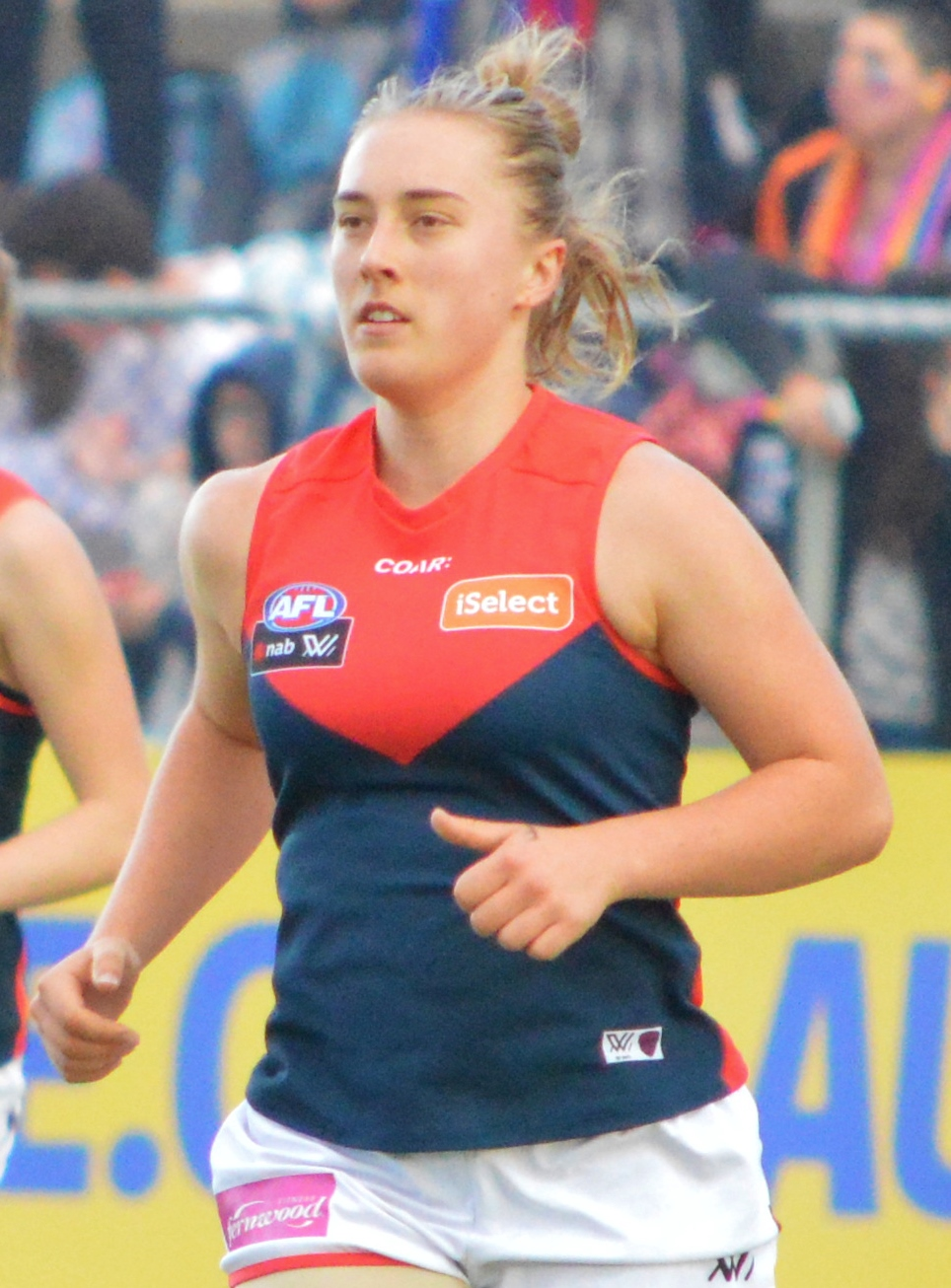
Jessica Anderson

Currently on an AFLW senior or rookie list

Player	Connection to United States	Years*	AFLW Matches*	AFLW Goals*	Notes
Katrina Stone	Born and raised	2021	-		Western Bulldogs, Carlton Football Club (VFLW) from North London Lions (AFL London)
Danielle Marshall	Born in California and raised in Colorado Springs to US parents, played there	2020–2023	23	4	Western Bulldogs (AFLW), Essendon Football Club (AFLW). From Arizona Hawks (USAFL)
April Lewis	Born and raised, played there	2019	-		Essendon Football Club (VFLW) from Seattle Grizzlies (USAFL)
Jessica Blecher	Born and raised, played there	2019	-		Collingwood Football Club (VFLW) from Portland Sockeyes (USAFL), currently with San Francisco Iron Maidens (USAFL)
Erin McLaughlin	Born and raised	2019	-		Darebin Falcons (VFLW)
Jessica Anderson	Parent	2017–2018	6	1	Western Bulldogs (AFLW)
Katie Klatt	Born and raised, played there	2017	-		Melbourne University Football Club (VFLW) from Sacramento Suns (USAFL), currently with San Francisco Iron Maidens (USAFL)

== Administration and governing body ==
The governing body for Australian Rules in the United States is the USAFL. The USAFL coordinates the national club competition, the USAFL Nationals and the national Revolution team selection, manages player registration and transfers and distributes funds to local clubs and competitions.

The USAFL Umpires Association (USAFLUA) represents the field of umpiring and the interpretation of the laws of the game.USAFL Umpires Association

== National team ==
The national teams are the USA Revolution and USA Freedom. Both are the sole national teams for Australian football in the United States and are administered by the United States Australian Football League.

=== Major tournaments ===
- USAFL National Championships – Held 2nd weekend of October every year
- 49th Parallel Cup – Held each non-International Cup year, alternating between U.S. & Canadian soil.
- AFL International Cup – Held every 3 years, began 2002.

== Domestic representative tournaments ==
- USAFL National Championships
- USAFL East vs West

== Participation ==
There are currently 49 active clubs across the country, 32 of which participated in the USAFL Nationals in 2018.

In 2004, there were 855 senior players in 38 active clubs. By 2006, the league had grown to 40 affiliated clubs, with 1,048 registered USAFL players and 340 USAFL sanctioned matches were played. Of the 709 players who competed at the USAFL National Championships, 77.4% were non-Australian, and over 60% were American.

The 2007 AFL International Census did not indicate any growth to these figures over 2006. The club numbers decreased to 32 in 2011, but player registrations remained at approximately 1,000.

== Leagues ==
=== Men's ===
- United States Australian Football League
  - Mid American Australian Football League (MAAFL)
  - Eastern Australian Football League
  - Golden Gate Australian Football League

=== Women's ===
- Women's Australian Football Association

See also Metro Footy Leagues

== Former leagues ==
- Many of the CAFL's clubs and former players still compete, either in the SCAFL or GGAFL. The SEAFL and NEAFL formed the EAFL.
  - Californian Australian Football League
  - South East Australian Football League
  - North East Australian Football League

== Audience ==
=== Television ===
Since 2020, the AFL has been shown on ESPN via ESPN2 and ESPN3.

Since 2006, due to growing demand and lobbying by AFANA, Australian rules began playing live matches on television in the United States on the new Setanta Sports USA network. Coverage in 2015 is on Fox Sports 2 and Fox Soccer Plus.

Australian rules has a nominal but growing international audience. According to Roy Morgan Polls 7,496,000 North Americans watch Australian rules football at least occasionally on television. This number is twice as many as watch it on television in Australia, but small by US standards.

=== Notable attendances ===
==== Local competitions ====
- 1,000 (2004) – Nashville Kangaroos v Chicago Swans (Nashville, Tennessee)
- 5,000 (1911) – San Francisco v Young Australia League (Lincoln Park, San Francisco)

==== Exhibition matches ====
- 14,787 (1990) – Melbourne v West Coast (Civic Stadium, Portland)

== See also ==
- USAFL
- AFANA

== Books ==
1. de Moore, Greg; Hess, Rob; Nicholson, Matthew; Stewart, Bob (2021). Australia's Game: The History of Australian Football. Hardie Grant Books. ISBN 9781-74379-657-3.
