= USAFL Western Regionals =

The USAFL Western Regionals is a representative Australian rules football tournament of USAFL clubs based in the western regions of the United States.

It is a two-part series established after the collapse of the Californian Australian Football League in 2004 to give clubs without regular league play (although some participate in the North West Pacific Australian Football League) a chance to compete in preparation for the USAFL National Championships, determining the seedings for the nationals as well as the USAFL East vs West tournament.

Sides that compete or have competed include:

Colours	Club	Nickname	City	State	Region	Est.	Titles (M)	Titles (F)	Website
	Arizona	Hawks	Phoenix	Arizona	West	1999			Link
	Denver	Bulldogs	Denver	Colorado	Central	1998	8	6	Link
	Golden Gate	Roos/Iron Maidens	San Francisco	California	West	1998	1	6	Link
	Las Vegas	Gamblers	Las Vegas	Nevada	West	2005			Link
	Los Angeles	Dragons	Los Angeles	California	West	2010			Link
	Orange County	Giants	Orange County	California	West	1998			Link
	Portland	Steelheads/Sockeyes	Portland	Oregon	West	1998			Link
	Sacramento	Suns	Sacramento	California	West	2009			Link
	San Diego	Lions	San Diego	California	West	1997	2		Link
	Seattle	Grizzlies	Seattle	Washington	West	1998			Link
	Wasatch	WarGulls	Wasatch County	Utah	West	2019			Link

== History ==
The first Western Regionals were held in San Diego on August 14 and 15 of 2004, with the Denver Bulldogs winning the tournament.

The 2005 series round 1 was held in Orange County and round 2 in Denver, again dominated by the Denver Bulldogs.

The 2006 round 1 series was held in San Pedro, with San Diego Lions taking the honors. The second round was hosted at San Diego with the San Diego Lions also taking out the honors.

Since 2015, Western Regional Champions include:

Date	Location	Champions
2015	Davis, California	Div I - Orange County Giants, Div II - Sacramento Suns, Women's - San Francisco Iron Maidens
2016	Salem, Oregon	
2017	Westminster, Colorado	
2018	Sacramento, California	Div I - Golden Gate Roos, Div II - Portland Steelhead, Women's - Portland Sockeyes
2019	Salem, Oregon	Div I - Golden Gate Roos, Div II - Portland Steelhead, Women's - San Francisco Iron Maidens
2020	Westminster, Colorado	Cancelled due to COVID-19
2021	Austin, Texas	
2022	Westminster, Colorado	Div I - Denver Bulldogs, Div II - Sacramento Suns, Women's - San Francisco Iron Maidens
2023	Lake Stevens, Washington	Div I - Golden Gate Roos, Div II - Portland Steelheads, Women's - San Francisco Iron Maidens
2024	Farmington, Utah	Men's - Golden Gate Roos, Women's - Minnesota Freeze

== See also ==
- United States Australian Football League
- USAFL Nationals
- USAFL East vs West
