= Seamus McNamara =

Personal information
- Full name: Seamus McNamara
- Nickname: Shae
- Born: June 2, 1985 (age 41); Milwaukee, WI, USA
- Draft: No. 47, 2010 rookie draft
- Height: 204 cm (6 ft 8 in)
- Weight: 104 kg (229 lb)
- Position: Forward

Playing career^{1}
Years	Club	Games (Goals)
2010–2012	Collingwood	0 (0)
- ^{1} Playing statistics correct to the end of 2012.

Seamus McNamara (born June 2, 1985) is an American-born former Australian rules footballer in the Australian Football League (AFL), and former professional basketball player.

McNamara signed a two-year international rookie contract and was selected by the Collingwood Football Club in the 2009 AFL rookie draft at pick 47.

Collingwood discovered McNamara, who played four seasons of NCAA Division I collegiate basketball in the US for Marist College in New York before playing one season of professional basketball in Germany for TSV Dachau Spurs.

When Collingwood gave out their jumper numbers for the 2010 season, McNamara requested the recently vacated number 23 (formerly worn by Anthony Rocca). Instead, McNamara was given the number 50 after Collingwood wished to keep the number 23 vacant after Rocca's departure. McNamara later said his number 50 could represent the 50 states of the United States.

On March 13, 2010, McNamara played in his first competitive match against an opposition team (a 61-point win over Geelong in a VFL pre-season game).

McNamara is the fifth player to be born in the United States to be associated with an AFL club and the first American-born player to play for Collingwood.

In September 2012, McNamara was delisted by Collingwood after having played three NAB pre-season cup matches for the club. After being delisted from Collingwood McNamara returned to his original sport, signing on to play with the Sandringham Sabres in the South East Australian Basketball League. In 2012, McNamara was delisted from the Sandringham Sabres.

== See also ==
- Australian rules football in the United States
- VFL/AFL players with international backgrounds
