= Harry Bromley =

Australian rules footballer

Personal information
- Full name: Harcourt Bromley
- Born: 30 November 1884; Shepparton, Victoria
- Died: 26 November 1937 (aged 52); Macleod, Victoria
- Original team: Leopold

Playing career^{1}
Years	Club	Games (Goals)
1905	South Melbourne	1 (0)
- ^{1} Playing statistics correct to the end of 1905.

Harry Bromley (30 November 1884 – 26 November 1937) was an Australian rules footballer who played with South Melbourne in the Victorian Football League (VFL).
