= San Francisco public grammar schools =

Defunct schools in California, United States

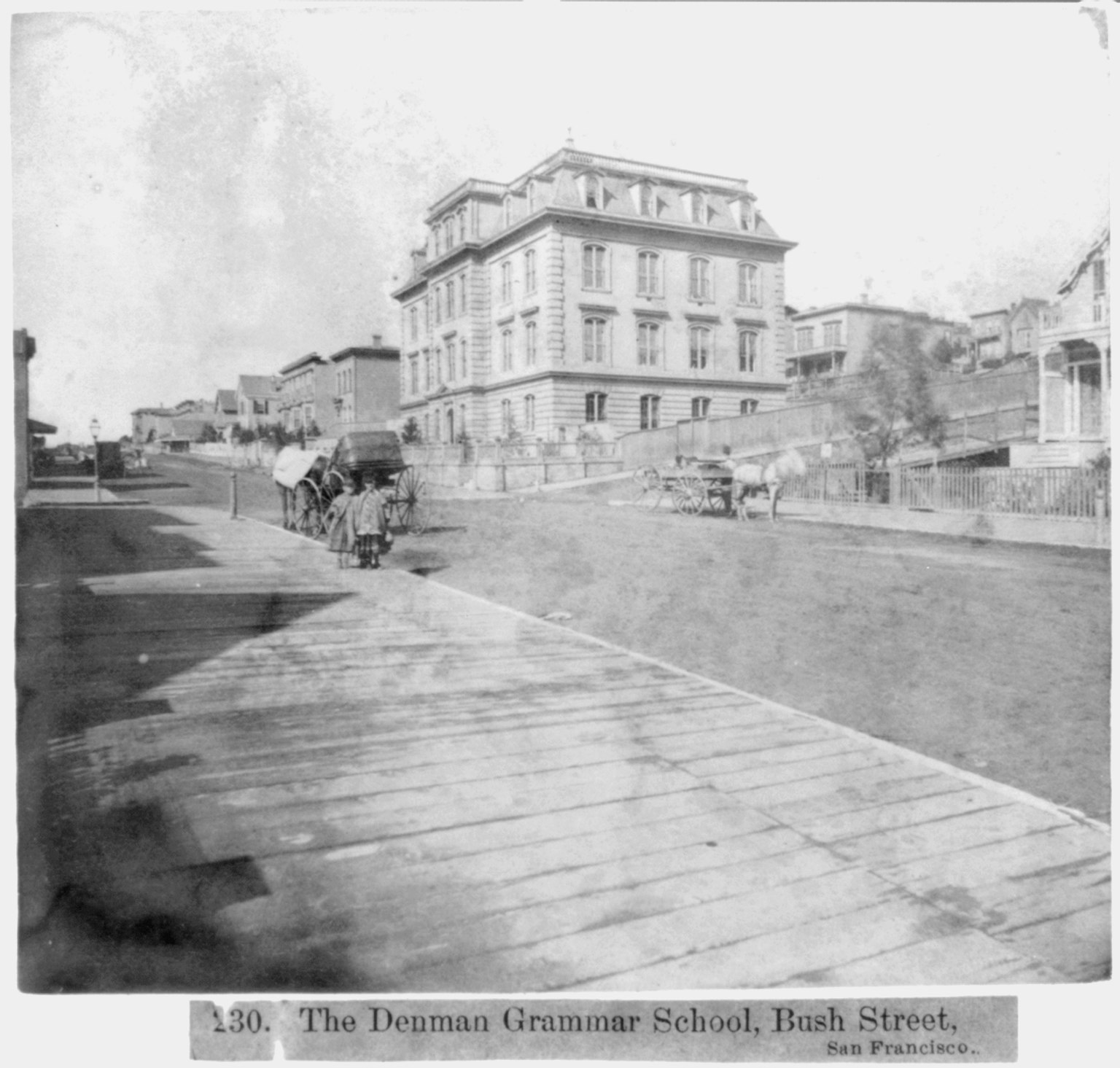
The Denman Grammar School, Bush Street, San Francisco LCCN2002722237

In 1879, San Francisco had 15 grammar schools, three all-girls (Denman, Rincon, and Broadway), three all-boys (Lincoln, Washington, and Union), and nine co-educational (Spring Valley, Hayes Valley, North and South Cosmopolitan, Valencia Street, Eighth Street, Mission, Jefferson, and Clement). In addition, co-ed Potrero School served both primary and grammar pupils. Students were expected to attend grammar school for seven or eight years.

Several grammar schools survive to this day, including James Denman Middle School, Lowell High School (formerly Union Grammar School), and Spring Valley Science Elementary School. Washington Grammar School is believed to have been destroyed in a fire in February 1930.

Three more grammar schools, Crocker, Hamilton, and Horace Mann, were created in 1913. These were the final grammar schools opened in San Francisco, as the later pupils of grammar school age would attend junior highs (first opened in 1922) and middle schools (opened in 1978).

== Academic awards ==
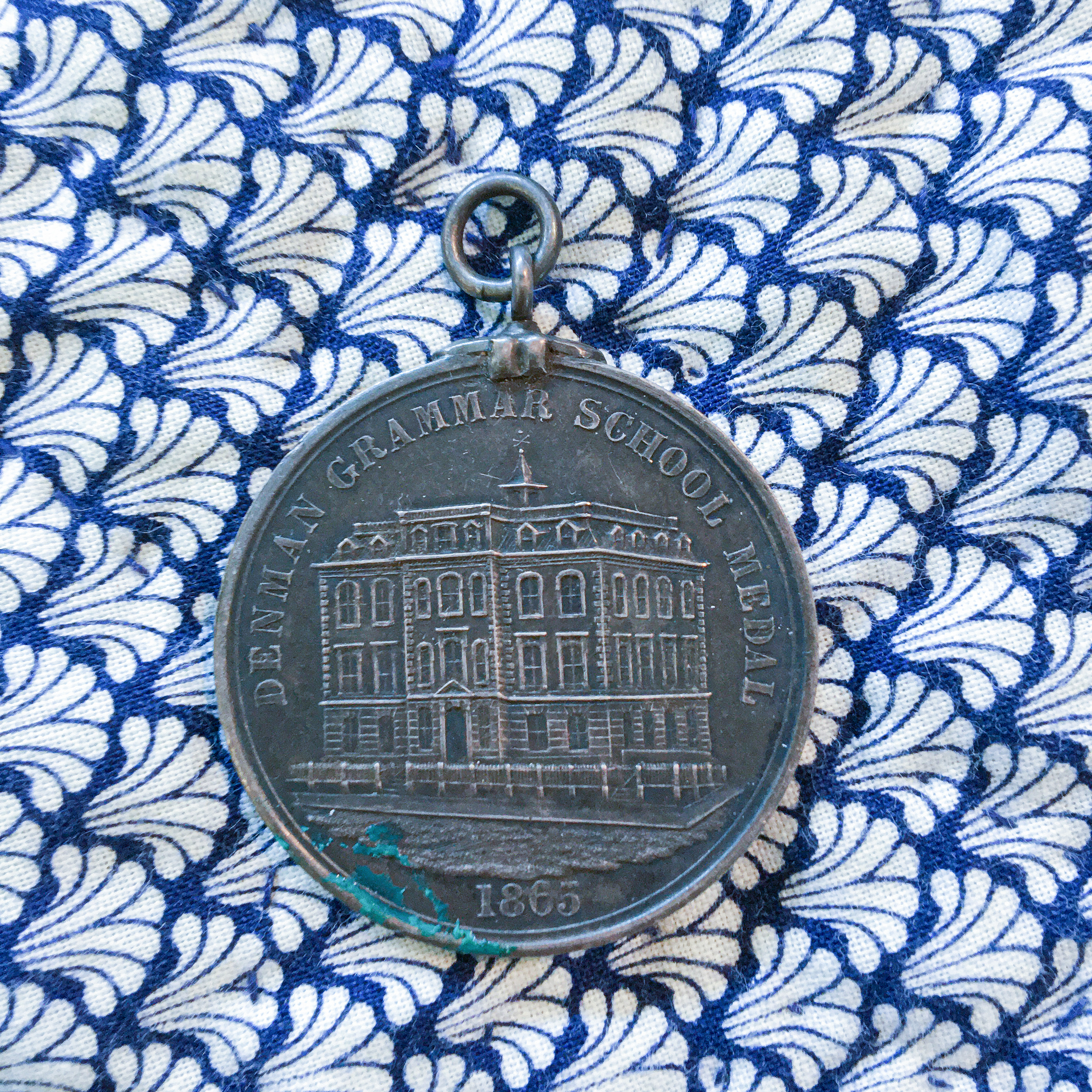
Denman Grammar School Medal

Four of the schools (Denman, Lincoln, Broadway) awarded medals to their top graduates. In addition, male pupils competed for the Bridge Medal, established by Samuel J. Bridge, who resided in San Francisco before returning to his native Dresden, Maine.

== Segregation ==
The Chinese Elementary School was created in response to a court ruling in 1885 that Chinese students must be educated. This ruling would have allowed Mamie Tape to attend Spring Valley Grammar School if the Chinese Elementary School had not been created to prevent her doing so.

== Statistics ==
In 1870, a typical grammar school building for 1,000 pupils cost $30,000 to build.

In 1875, 6,055 students were enrolled in San Francisco's grammar schools, taught by 129 teachers (102 of whom were female).

The first female principal of a San Francisco grammar school was Kate Kennedy, who was appointed in 1856.
