= Dwayne Armstrong =

American sportsman (born 1971)

Dwayne Armstrong (born March 18, 1971) is an American former sportsman who played American football and Australian rules football.

== College football career ==
Armstrong played college football for Iowa State in 1991 and 1992, lettering in both years. He was a member of the Los Angeles Raiders practice squad, but did not get activated to the main squad.

== Australian rules football ==
The African-American athlete is best known for converting to Australian rules football. Armstrong met Melanie Oakley, the daughter of Ross Oakley, the chief executive officer of the Australian Football League (AFL). He convinced Essendon Football Club coach Kevin Sheedy to recruit Armstrong, the first American raised athlete to switch to professional Australian rules football.

He showed some promise and was put on Essendon's supplementary list. Although he did not debut at senior AFL level, he played several reserve grade and pre-season games. He also spent a season developing his skills with Russell Jeffrey at the Wanderers Football Club in Darwin, Northern Territory.

Following his AFL attempt, Armstrong took a job with Ross Oakley's company that had acquired the license to sell NFL products in Australia. He became the NFL development manager for Australasia and was involved in arranging the NFL to be televised in Australia, the 1999 American Bowl game between the San Diego Chargers and the Denver Broncos in Sydney and the Superpunt punting talent search that led to Mat McBriar winning a scholarship to the University of Hawaii.
