= Australian Football Association of North America =

The Australian Football Association of North America (AFANA) is a non-profit organization that formed out of a campaign to save television coverage of Australian rules football in the United States and Canada in 1996. AFANA has an emphasis on the fan, and aims to help the game to develop and to improve its exposure in North America, including better TV coverage.

== Early history ==
AFANA was co-founded by three members of the 1995-1996 campaign: Richard Lipp of Kansas City, Wade Hinkle of Dallas, and Rob de Santos (then of Vienna, WV) when it was learned that the sport had no TV coverage for the 1996 season. The campaign was ultimately successful and coverage began on the new ESPN2 ("the deuce") network in June. The network declined to cover the Grand Final in 1996. The AFL tried to find another network, but in the end, turned to AFANA and the Australian-American Chamber of Commerce of Southern California. The two organizations successfully put the game on the air on satellite in the USA and Canada in just 8 days. This firmly established AFANA. The following year, coverage continued on ESPN. Again, problems with the Grand Final occurred when ESPN delayed the broadcast 95 minutes (due to live baseball) on just 36 hours notice after repeated assurances that the game would be live. Despite an intense lobbying effort, ESPN did not budge. The relationship between the Australian Football League, AFANA, and ESPN continued to be strained and after the 1997 season, the network again dropped the sport. With AFANA's help, the sport moved to the new Fox Sports World channel the following year.

== Coverage ==
The organization has played a part in every effort to keep TV coverage since its founding including network changes in 1998, 2007, 2009, and 2012. In 2004, Fox announced the channel was changing names to Fox Soccer Channel and would eventually drop all non-soccer coverage. AFANA successfully lobbied for the coverage to continue into the 2006 season. The following year resulted in a major success of the lobby group with the televising of live AFL matches beginning in 2007 by Setanta Sports (USA). Current TV coverage is again on Fox networks including Fox Sports 2 and Fox Soccer Plus, a premium network.

Coverage was briefly lost when Setanta Sports USA went into bankruptcy in August, 2009. ESPN picked up coverage on its internet channel, then ESPN360 (later ESPN3) plus about 4 matches a year and the Grand Final on ESPN2. ESPN did not renew the contract after 2011. Weekly coverage returned in 2012 to Fox Soccer Plus the successor channel to Fox Sports World.

For the 2018 season, officials at the Australian Football League have told AFANA coverage will continue on Fox Soccer Plus and on through the 2020 season. A post on the AFANA website says Fox Soccer Plus will broadcast a minimum of 2 live games per week. The network has also committed to show all finals matches, leading up to and including the Grand Final. AFANA consolidates the schedules of every network in North America which carries the sport into one listing on its web site, a major convenience for fans.

== Grand Final Parties ==
One of AFANA's major services is the posting of announcements of the many AFL Grand Final parties held in North America (and sometimes Europe and Asia). These yearly parties are typically held the day of the Grand Final and usually feature Australian food and beverages as the staple refreshments for the event.

== See also ==
- US Footy
- AFL Canada
