= Gordon Inkster =

Australian cricketer

Personal information
- Born: 30 June 1893; Portland Estate, Australia
- Died: 22 March 1957 (aged 63); Sydney, Australia
- Source: Cricinfo, 9 August 2020

Gordon Inkster (30 June 1893 – 22 March 1957) was an Australian cricketer and Australian rules footballer. He played in six first-class matches for South Australia between 1926 and 1928.

== See also ==
- List of South Australian representative cricketers
