= Californian Australian Football League =

The California Australian Football League (CAFL) was the first organized league of Australian rules football in the United States of America, and is in itself a member of the United States Australian Football League. Wayne Pollock served as the CAFL's first head. The current president is Chris Olson.

The league was founded on 1 April 1998 with four foundation clubs: Inland Empire Eagles, Los Angeles Crows, Orange County Bombers, San Diego Lions. They were joined in 1999 by Santa Cruz 'Roos and in 2000 by the Phoenix Scorpions. In 2002, the Inland Empire Eagles club folded and the Santa Cruz 'Roos left to focus on GGAFL. The Phoenix Scorpions changed name in 2003 to become the Arizona Hawks, then left in 2004 to join the Arizona Australian Football League. Further changes in 2004 introduced the Mojave Greens and Valley Vandals, and restructuring allowed several clubs to enter multiple teams in the regular season (Orange County: Huntington Beach Hammerheads, Inland Empire Fire, Orange County Crush; San Diego: Cougars, Jaguars).

The CAFL is a member of the USAFL South-Western Ausfootball Region.

In 2005, the league went into indefinite stasis with clubs participating in either the newly formed Metro Footy league the Southern California Australian Football League and the US Footy Nationals.
