= USAFL East vs West =

Australian rules football tournament

An Australian rules football tournament in the United States, similar to the National Basketball Association All-Star Game.

Pitches 44 of the best players in the USA against each other. The first of these games was held in 2003, and it became a much anticipated annual event. Each year, both All-American and All-Star sides take the field.

== Past matches ==
- 2003 - All-American: East defeated West by about 80 points (held at California State University, Long Beach, CA)
- 2004 - All-American: East 9.11.65 defeated West 7.17.59 (held at Atlanta, GA)
- 2005 - All-American: West 8.11.59 defeated East 3.7.25 (held at Dallas, TX)
- 2006 - canceled (would have been held at Sarasota, FL)
- 2007 - All-American: West 15.10.100 defeated East 10.5.65 (held at Fort Lauderdale, FL)
