= 2009 New South Wales Swifts season =

NSW Swifts season

New South Wales Swifts
- 2009 season
- Head coach: Julie Fitzgerald
- Asst. coach: Tracey Robinson
- Manager: Jan Troy
- Captain: Catherine Cox
- Main venue: Sydney Olympic Park Sports Centre

Season results
- Wins–losses: 2–11
- Regular season: 9th
- Finals placing: DNQ
- Team colours

New South Wales Swifts seasons
- ← 2008 2010 →

The 2009 New South Wales Swifts season saw New South Wales Swifts play in the 2009 ANZ Championship. With a team coached by Julie Fitzgerald and captained by Catherine Cox, Swifts won only 2 of their 13 matches during the regular season and finished ninth.

== Players ==
=== Player movements ===
▲ Gains	▼ Losses
Sarah Barrett; Ashlee Mann (NNSW Blues/NNSW Waratahs); Jessica Mansell (NNSW Waratahs); Samantha May (Australian Institute of Sport); Courtney Tairi (Australian Institute of Sport); Amy Wild	Selina Gilsenan Retirement; Adelaide Johnson; Tiffany Lincoln; Leah Shoard (Southern Steel)

=== Roster ===
2009 New South Wales Swifts roster
Players
Coaching staff

Nat.	Name	Position(s)	DoB	Height
(Australia)	Erin Bell	GA, GS, WA	30 April 1987 (aged 20)	1.78 m (5 ft 10 in)
(Australia)	Rebecca Bulley	GD, GK, WD	18 August 1982 (aged 25)	1.86 m (6 ft 1 in)
(Australia)	Catherine Cox (c)	GS, GA	24 May 1976 (aged 31)	1.88 m (6 ft 2 in)
(Australia)	Kimberlee Green	C, WA	5 March 1986 (aged 22)	1.76 m (5 ft 9 in)
(Australia)	Emma Koster	GD, GK	29 May 1984 (aged 23)	1.88 m (6 ft 2 in)
(Australia)	Ashlee Mann	WD, C, WA	29 April 1988 (aged 24)	1.76 m (5 ft 9 in)
(Australia)	Samantha May	GD, WD	16 September 1987 (aged 22)	1.83 m (6 ft 0 in)
(Australia)	Susan Pratley	GA, GS	23 March 1984 (aged 24)	1.80 m (5 ft 11 in)
(Australia)	Kimberley Smith	GD, GK, WD	18 June 1982 (aged 25)	1.82 m (6 ft 0 in)
(New Zealand)	Courtney Tairi	C, WA	15 July 1988 (aged 21)	1.81 m (5 ft 11 in)
(Australia)	Vanessa Ware	WA, C	26 October 1985 (aged 22)	1.71 m (5 ft 7 in)
(Australia)	Amorette Wild	GA, GS, WA	10 August 1989 (aged 20)	1.78 m (5 ft 10 in)

Head coach

- (Australia) Julie Fitzgerald

Assistant coach

- (Australia) Tracey Robinson

Manager: Jan Troy
Physiotherapist: Sean Mungovan
Strength and conditioning: Bryce Cavanagh

Notes

- (c) – Captain
- (cc) – Co-captain
- (vc) – Vice-captain
- – Injury / maternity leave
- (TRP) – Temporary Replacement Player

=== Player milestones ===
In 2009 six players made their ANZ Championship debut for Swifts:

- Samantha May and Erin Bell made their debut in Round 1 against Canterbury Tactix.
- Jessica Mansell made her debut in Round 7 against Queensland Firebirds
- Amy Wild made her debut in Round 13 against Central Pulse
- Ashlee Mann and Courtney Tairi made their debut in Round 14 against Southern Steel.

== Pre-season ==
Swifts played in two pre-season tournaments. In February 2009 they played in the Queenstown Pre-Season Tournament, losing 58–53 to Northern Mystics in the final. In March 2009, Swifts played in and won the 2009 SOPA Cup, hosted by Netball New South Wales at the Sydney Olympic Park Sports Centre.

== Regular season ==
=== Fixtures and results ===
Round 1

Monday 6 April	New South Wales Swifts	62–45	Canterbury Tactix	Sydney Olympic Park Sports Centre
7:00 pm	Catherine Cox 34/37 (92%); Susan Pratley 17/19 (89%); Erin Bell 11/13 (85%)	Report; Stats	Jodi Brown 25/28 (89%); Angela Mitchell 20/26 (77%)	Umpires: Sharon Kelly; Helen George; Reserve umpire: Peta Quinn

Round 2

Sunday 12 April	Adelaide Thunderbirds	48–47	New South Wales Swifts	ETSA Park
2:00 pm	Kate Beveridge 25/30 (83%); Natalie Medhurst 23/25 (92%)	Report; Stats	Catherine Cox 26/30 (87%); Susan Pratley 21/23 (91%)

Round 3

Monday 20 April	Waikato Bay of Plenty Magic	63–45	New South Wales Swifts	Mystery Creek Events Centre
7:00 pm	Irene van Dyk 45/45 (100%); Maria Tutaia 14/15 (93%); Jessica Tuki 4/5 (80%)	Report; Stats	Catherine Cox 11/12 (92%); Susan Pratley 20/23 (87%); Erin Bell 14/17 (82%)

Round 4

Monday 27 April	New South Wales Swifts	59–55	Northern Mystics	Sydney Olympic Park Sports Centre
7:00 pm	Catherine Cox 29/33 (88%); Susan Pratley 30/35 (86%)	Report; Stats	Cathrine Latu 38/40 (95%); Pamela Cookey 10/10 (100%); Grace Rasmussen 7/8 (88%)

Round 5

Monday 4 May	West Coast Fever	67–66	New South Wales Swifts	Challenge Stadium
6:00 pm	Caitlin Bassett 54/63 (86%); Bianca Franklin 7/8 (88%); Nikala Smith 6/8 (75%)	Q4: 54–54; Report; Stats	Catherine Cox 39/50 (78%); Susan Pratley 27/32 (84%)

Round 6

Sunday 10 May	New South Wales Swifts	40–51	Adelaide Thunderbirds	Sydney Olympic Park Sports Centre
2:30 pm	Catherine Cox 9/15 (60%); Susan Pratley 22/27 (81%); Erin Bell 9/16 (56%)	Report; Stats	Kate Beveridge 43/47 (91%); Natalie Medhurst 8/10 (80%)

Round 7

Monday 18 May	New South Wales Swifts	54–58	Queensland Firebirds	Sydney Olympic Park Sports Centre
7:00 pm	Catherine Cox 32/43 (74%); Susan Pratley 22/26 (85%)	Report; Stats	Romelda Aiken 51/60 (85%); Alissa Castrisos 4/7 (57%); Janelle Lawson 3/4 (75%)

Round 8

Monday 25 May	Melbourne Vixens	65–63	New South Wales Swifts	Hisense Arena
19:00 (UTC+10)	Sharelle McMahon 22/25 (88%); Caitlin Thwaites 43/51 (84%)	Q4: 54–54; Report; Stats	Catherine Cox 40/50 (80%); Susan Pratley 23/26 (88%)

Round 9

New South Wales Swifts received a bye.

Round 10

Sunday 7 June	Queensland Firebirds	62–61	New South Wales Swifts	Brisbane Convention and Exhibition Centre
2:30 pm	Romelda Aiken 52/61 (85%); Alissa Castrisos 1/3 (33%); Janelle Lawson 9/11 (82%)	Report; Stats	Catherine Cox 39/49 (80%); Susan Pratley 22/28 (79%)

Round 11

Monday 15 June	New South Wales Swifts	52–63	Melbourne Vixens	Sydney Olympic Park Sports Centre
19:00 (UTC+10)	Catherine Cox 32/38 (84%); Susan Pratley 20/22 (91%)	Report; Stats	Sharelle McMahon 16/19 (84%); Caitlin Thwaites 47/52 (90%)	Attendance: 4,200

Round 12

Sunday 21 June	New South Wales Swifts	60–63	West Coast Fever	Sydney Olympic Park Sports Centre
2:30 pm	Catherine Cox 43/50 (86%); Susan Pratley 17/19 (89%)	Report; Stats	Caitlin Bassett 51/54 (94%); Nikala Smith 3/5 (60%); Bianca Franklin 9/10 (90%)

Round 13

Sunday 28 June	Central Pulse	53–52	New South Wales Swifts	Te Rauparaha Arena
6:30 pm	Paula Griffin 35/39 (90%); Te Amo Amaru-Tibble 18/21 (86%)	Report; Stats	Catherine Cox 26/36 (72%); Susan Pratley 26/32 (81%)

Round 14

Saturday 4 July	Southern Steel	55–48	New South Wales Swifts	Stadium Southland
2:00 pm	Donna Wilkins 36/38 (95%); Megan Dehn 19/23 (83%)	Report; Stats	Catherine Cox 29/35 (83%); Susan Pratley 19/25 (76%)

=== Final table ===
2009 ANZ Championship ladder
Pos	Team	Pld	W	D	L	GF	GA	G%	Pts
1	Melbourne Vixens	13	12	0	1	769	614	125.24	24
2	Waikato Bay of Plenty Magic	13	11	0	2	673	562	119.75	22
3	Adelaide Thunderbirds	13	10	0	3	698	579	120.55	20
4	Southern Steel	13	8	0	5	662	645	102.64	16
5	Queensland Firebirds	13	8	0	5	700	690	101.45	16
6	Canterbury Tactix	13	5	0	8	639	662	96.53	10
7	West Coast Fever	13	5	0	8	666	735	90.61	10
8	Northern Mystics	13	3	0	10	642	727	88.31	6
9	New South Wales Swifts	13	2	0	11	709	748	94.79	4
10	Central Pulse	13	1	0	12	594	790	75.19	2
Updated 20 February 2021

Qualified for Major semi-final
Qualified for Minor semi-final

- Pld = Games played
- W = Win (2 points)
- D = Draw (1 point)
- L = Loss (0 points)
- GF = Goals For (Total goals scored)
- GA = Goals Against (Total goals conceded)
- G% = Goal percentage (= 100 × GF/GA)
- Pts = Points

== Award winners ==
=== Swifts awards ===
Award	Winner
QBE NSW Swifts MVP	Catherine Cox
NSW Swifts Members' Player of the Year	Susan Pratley
NSW Swifts Players' Player of the Year	Kimberley Smith

== Gallery ==
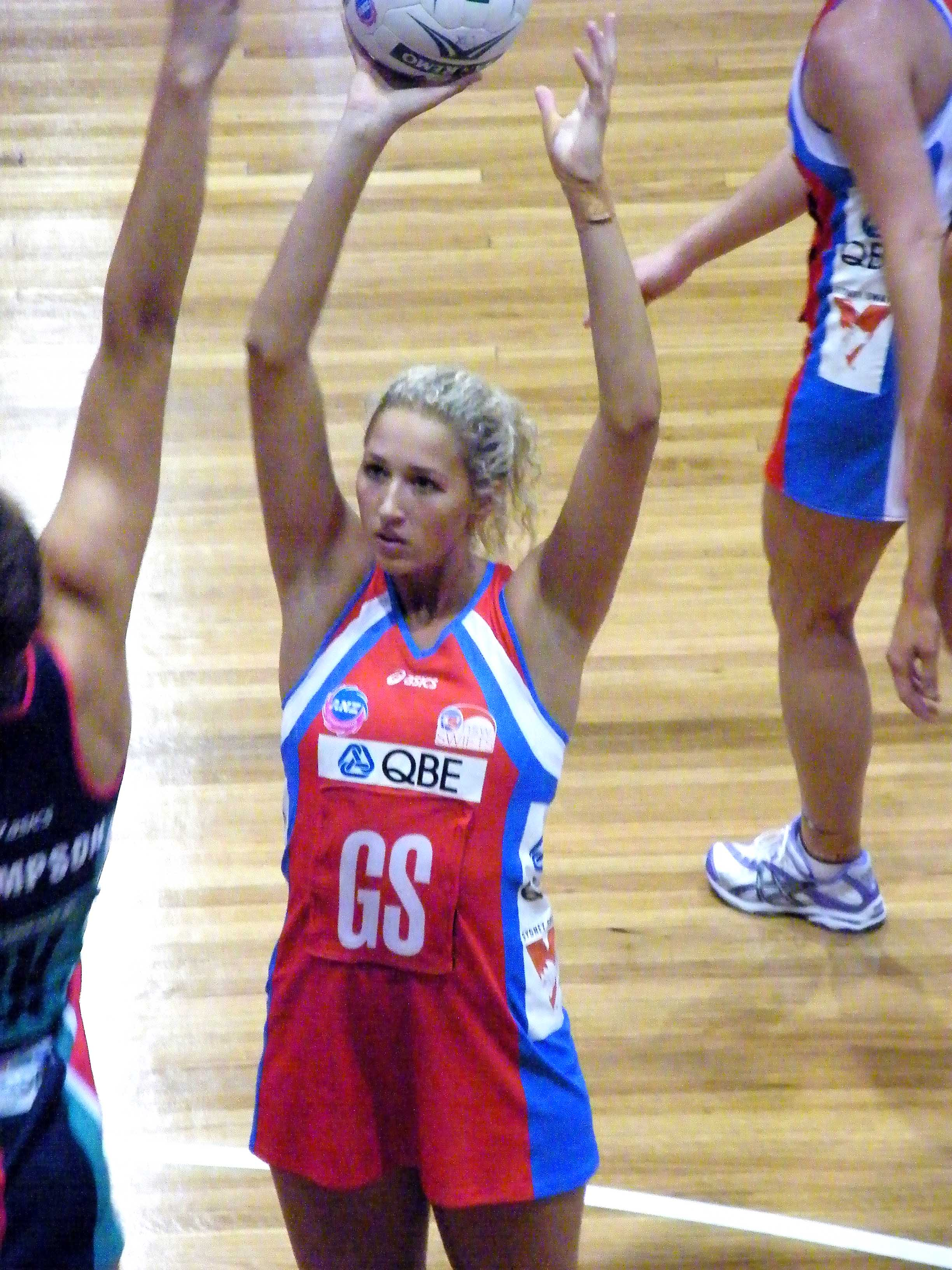
7 March 2009; Erin Bell (GS) of New South Wales Swifts prepares to shoot against Brooke Thompson (GK) of Melbourne Vixens during the pre-season tournament, the 2009 SOPA Cup. Bell subsequently made her ANZ Championship debut with Swifts in the Round 1 match against Canterbury Tactix.

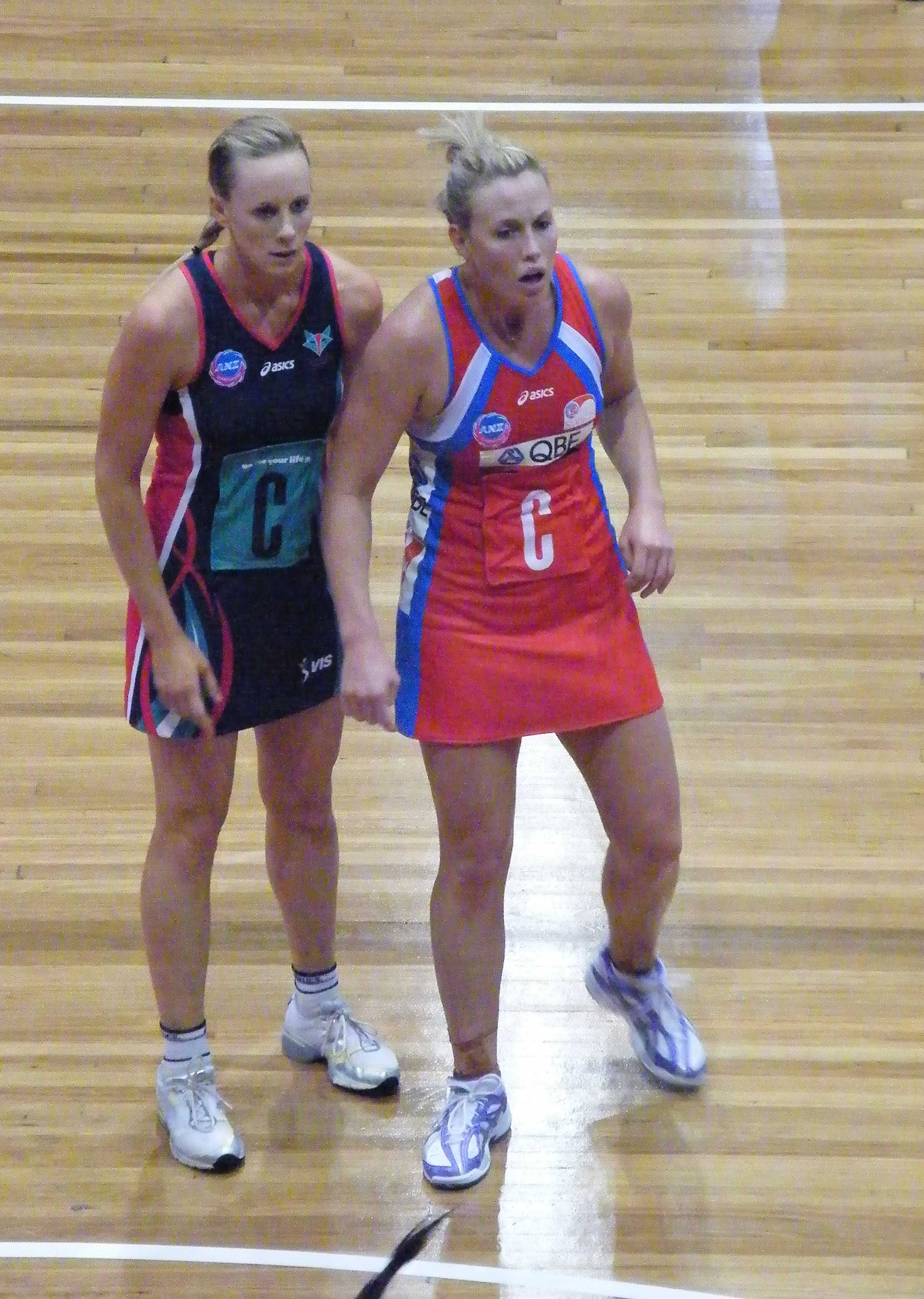
7 March 2009; Renae Hallinan (left) of Melbourne Vixens and Kimberlee Green (right) of New South Wales Swifts during the pre-season tournament, the 2009 SOPA Cup.
