= 2008 New South Wales Swifts season =

NSW Swifts season

New South Wales Swifts
- 2008 season
- Head coach: Julie Fitzgerald
- Asst. coach: Tracey Robinson
- Manager: Jan Troy
- Captain: Catherine Cox
- Vice-captain: Selina Gilsenan
- Main venue: Sydney Olympic Park Sports Centre; Acer Arena; Newcastle Entertainment Centre

Season results
- Wins–losses: 12–3
- Regular season: 2nd
- Finals placing: Champions
- Team colours

New South Wales Swifts seasons
- ← 2007 2009 →

The 2008 New South Wales Swifts season was the inaugural season for both New South Wales Swifts and the ANZ Championship. Swifts were formed in late 2007 when Netball New South Wales merged its two former Commonwealth Bank Trophy league teams, Sydney Swifts and Hunter Jaegers, in order to enter a single team in the 2008 ANZ Championship. With a team coached by Julie Fitzgerald and captained by Catherine Cox, Swifts won 10 of their 13 matches during the regular season and finished second behind Waikato Bay of Plenty Magic. Swifts subsequently defeated Magic in both the major semi–final and the grand final to become the inaugural ANZ Championship winners.

== Players ==
=== Player movements ===
▲ Gains	▼ Losses
Erin Bell (Sydney Swifts); Rebecca Bulley (Melbourne Kestrels); Catherine Cox (Sydney Swifts); Selina Gilsenan (Sydney Swifts); Kimberlee Green (Sydney Swifts); Adelaide Johnson (Sydney Swifts); Emma Koster (Hunter Jaegers); Tiffany Lincoln (Hunter Jaegers); Susan Pratley (Sydney Swifts); Kimberley Purcell (Sydney Swifts); Leah Shoard (AIS Canberra Darters); Vanessa Ware (Sydney Swifts)	Megan Dehn (Southern Steel) ^{(Note 2)}

Notes

- ^1 Eight members of the 2008 New South Wales Swifts squad had been members of the 2007 Sydney Swifts squad that had won the Commonwealth Bank Trophy league title.
- ^2 Megan Dehn was originally a member of the 2008 Swifts squad but subsequently withdrew and joined Southern Steel.

=== Roster ===
2008 New South Wales Swifts roster
Players
Coaching staff

Nat.	Name	Position(s)	DoB	Height
(Australia)	Erin Bell	GA, GS, WA	30 April 1987 (aged 20)	1.78 m (5 ft 10 in)
(Australia)	Rebecca Bulley	GD, GK, WD	18 August 1982 (aged 25)	1.86 m (6 ft 1 in)
(Australia)	Catherine Cox (c)	GS, GA	24 May 1976 (aged 31)	1.88 m (6 ft 2 in)
(Australia)	Selina Gilsenan (vc)	C, WD	31 May 1978 (aged 29)	1.71 m (5 ft 7 in)
(Australia)	Kimberlee Green	C, WA	5 March 1986 (aged 22)	1.76 m (5 ft 9 in)
(Australia)	Adelaide Johnson	GK, GD	8 October 1986 (aged 21)	1.86 m (6 ft 1 in)
(Australia)	Emma Koster	GD, GK	29 May 1984 (aged 23)	1.88 m (6 ft 2 in)
(Australia)	Tiffany Lincoln	GA, WA	7 April 1985 (aged 23)	1.74 m (5 ft 9 in)
(Australia)	Susan Pratley	GA, GS	23 March 1984 (aged 24)	1.80 m (5 ft 11 in)
(Australia)	Kimberley Purcell	GD, GK, WD	18 June 1982 (aged 25)	1.82 m (6 ft 0 in)
(Australia)	Leah Shoard	GA, GS, WA	23 May 1986 (aged 21)	1.73 m (5 ft 8 in)
(Australia)	Vanessa Ware	WA, C	26 October 1985 (aged 22)	1.71 m (5 ft 7 in)

Head coach

- (Australia) Julie Fitzgerald

Assistant coach

- (Australia) Tracey Robinson

Manager: Jan Troy
Physiotherapist: Sean Mungovan
Strength and conditioning: Bryce Cavanagh

Notes

- (c) – Captain
- (cc) – Co-captain
- (vc) – Vice-captain
- – Injury / maternity leave
- (TRP) – Temporary Replacement Player

== Regular season ==
On 7 April, Swifts made their ANZ Championship debut against Southern Steel at the Acer Arena. During the regular season Swifts won 10 of their 13 matches and finished second behind Waikato Bay of Plenty Magic.

=== Fixtures and results ===
Round 1

Monday 7 April	New South Wales Swifts	53–42	Southern Steel	Acer Arena
7:00 pm	Catherine Cox 28/39 (72%); Susan Pratley 25/28 (89%)	Report; Stats	Daneka Wipiiti 34/44 (77%); Megan Dehn 7/12 (58%); Julianna Naoupu 1/1 (100%)	Umpires: Sharon Kelly; Jacqui Jashari; Reserve umpire: Collette Brennan

Round 2

Saturday 12 April	Canterbury Tactix	50–44	New South Wales Swifts	Westpac Arena
2:30 pm	Jodi Brown 35/41 (85%); Anna Thompson 15/20 (75%)	Report; Stats	Catherine Cox 26/37 (70%); Susan Pratley 18/24 (75%)	Umpires: Mandy Nottingham; Pauline Sciascia; Reserve umpire: David Pala'amo

Round 3

Saturday 19 April	New South Wales Swifts	50–47	Waikato Bay of Plenty Magic	Newcastle Entertainment Centre
2:30 pm	Catherine Cox 31/38 (82%); Susan Pratley 19/22 (86%)	Report; Stats	Irene van Dyk 29/32 (91%); Maria Tutaia 18/23 (78%)	Umpires: Sharon Kelly; Helen George; Reserve umpire: Collette Brennan

Round 4

Monday 28 April	New South Wales Swifts	59–30	Central Pulse	Sydney Olympic Park Sports Centre
7:00 pm	Catherine Cox 36/43 (84%); Susan Pratley 15/17 (88%); Leah Shoard 8/12 (67%)	Report; Stats	Susan Tagicakibau 19/23 (83%); Jamilah Gupwell 3/5 (60%); Amber Bellringer 8/14 (57%)	Umpires: Sharon Kelly; Rachael Ayre; Reserve umpire: Helen George

Round 5

Monday 5 May	New South Wales Swifts	52–53	Melbourne Vixens	Newcastle Entertainment Centre
7:00 pm	Catherine Cox 36/42 (86%); Susan Pratley 16/20 (80%)	Stats	Sharelle McMahon 21/24 (88%); Caitlin Thwaites 32/42 (76%)

Round 6

Saturday 10 May	Queensland Firebirds	66–52	New South Wales Swifts	Brisbane Convention & Exhibition Centre
2:30 pm	Romelda Aiken 58/60 (97%); Tamsin Greenway 8/9 (89%)	Report; Stats	Catherine Cox 28/31 (90%); Susan Pratley 24/31 (77%)

Round 7

Monday 19 May	New South Wales Swifts	66–54	West Coast Fever	Sydney Olympic Park Sports Centre
7:00 pm	Catherine Cox 32/43 (74%); Susan Pratley 34/37 (92%)	Stats	Caitlin Bassett 49/54 (91%); Nikala Smith 4/5 (80%); Bianca Franklin 1/1 (100%)	Umpires: Sharon Kelly; Annie Kloppers; Reserve umpire: Collette Brennan

Round 8

Monday 26 May	Adelaide Thunderbirds	44–50	New South Wales Swifts	ETSA Park
6:30 pm	Natalie Medhurst 15/17 (88%); Kate Beveridge 29/32 (91%)	Report; Stats	Catherine Cox 34/39 (87%); Susan Pratley 16/18 (89%)	Umpires: Jacqui Jashari; Collette Brennan; Reserve umpire: Pauline Francisco

Round 9

New South Wales Swifts received a bye.

Round 10

Monday 9 June	Northern Mystics	62–64	New South Wales Swifts	Trusts Stadium
7:00 pm	Catherine Latu 48/52 (92%); Grace Rasmussen 14/19 (74%)	Report; Stats	Catherine Cox 35/39 (90%); Susan Pratley 28/28 (100%)	Umpires: Bronwyn Meek; Mandy Nottingham; Reserve umpire: Jonathon Bredin

Round 11

Sunday 15 June	New South Wales Swifts	61–60	Queensland Firebirds	Sydney Olympic Park Sports Centre
1:30 pm	Catherine Cox 32/36 (89%); Susan Pratley 29/33 (88%)	Report; Stats	Romelda Aiken 53/56 (95%); Tamsin Greenway 3/4 (75%); Sophie Croft 4/6 (67%)	Umpires: Jacqui Jashari; Kate Wright; Reserve umpire: Collette Brennan

Round 12

Monday 23 June	New South Wales Swifts	51–41	Adelaide Thunderbirds	Sydney Olympic Park Sports Centre
7:00 pm	Catherine Cox 33/39 (85%); Susan Pratley 18/24 (75%)	Report; Stats	Kate Beveridge 22/26 (85%); Natalie Medhurst 17/18 (94%); Kristen Hughes 2/4 (50%)	Umpires: Sharon Kelly; Pauline Francisco; Reserve umpire: Collette Brennan

Round 13

Monday 30 June	Melbourne Vixens	49–62	New South Wales Swifts	Vodafone Arena
7:00 pm	Sharelle McMahon 16/23 (70%); Caitlin Thwaites 33/38 (87%)	Report; Stats	Catherine Cox 32/41 (78%); Susan Pratley 30/33 (91%)	Umpires: Kate Wright; Sharon Kelly; Reserve umpire: Raechel Richards

Round 14

Monday 7 July	West Coast Fever	54–63	New South Wales Swifts	Challenge Stadium
6:00 pm	Caitlin Bassett 46/54 (85%); Nikala Smith 8/9 (89%)	Report; Stats	Catherine Cox 34/45 (76%); Susan Pratley 29/34 (85%)	Umpires: Jacqui Jashari; Kate Wright; Reserve umpire: Tammy Howard

=== Final table ===
2008 ANZ Championship season
	Team	Pld	W	D	L	GF	GA	G%	Pts
1	Waikato Bay of Plenty Magic	13	10	0	3	687	599	114.69	20
2	New South Wales Swifts	13	10	0	3	727	652	111.50	20
3	Adelaide Thunderbirds	13	9	0	4	652	577	113.00	18
4	Melbourne Vixens	13	9	0	4	673	620	108.55	18
5	Queensland Firebirds	13	7	0	6	693	645	107.44	14
6	Southern Steel	13	7	0	6	617	616	100.16	14
7	Northern Mystics	13	5	0	8	625	637	98.12	10
8	Canterbury Tactix	13	5	0	8	607	678	89.53	10
9	West Coast Fever ^{(Note 3)}	13	2	1	10	605	697	86.80	5
10	Central Pulse ^{(Note 3)}	13	0	1	12	471	636	74.06	1
Updated: 17 February 2021

Qualified for Major semi-final
Qualified for Minor semi-final

- Pld = Games played
- W = Win (2 points)
- D = Draw (1 point)
- L = Loss (0 points)
- GF = Goals For (Total goals scored)
- GA = Goals Against (Total goals conceded)
- G% = Goal percentage (= 100 × GF/GA)
- Pts = Points

Notes

- ^3 The Round 10 match between West Coast Fever and Central Pulse was called off due to a stadium leak. The match was declared a draw, with each team receiving one point. Fever were leading 33–16 when the match was called off. The goals scored by each team were included in the final table.

== Playoffs ==
Swifts defeated Magic in both the major semi–final and the grand final to become the inaugural ANZ Championship winners.

=== Major semi-final ===
Sunday 13 July; 17:30 (UTC+12)	Stats	Waikato Bay of Plenty Magic	56–57	New South Wales Swifts	Mystery Creek Events Centre; Umpires: Jacqui Jashari; Bronwyn Meek; Reserve umpire: Mandy Nottingham	FOXSports; SKYSport
Sunday 13 July; 17:30 (UTC+12)	Stats	Scoring by quarter: 15-16, 17-14, 9-17, 15-10			Mystery Creek Events Centre; Umpires: Jacqui Jashari; Bronwyn Meek; Reserve umpire: Mandy Nottingham	FOXSports; SKYSport
Sunday 13 July; 17:30 (UTC+12)	Stats	Irene van Dyk 29/29 (100%); Maria Tutaia 27/34 (79%)		Catherine Cox 41/48 (85%); Susan Pratley 16/19 (84%)	Mystery Creek Events Centre; Umpires: Jacqui Jashari; Bronwyn Meek; Reserve umpire: Mandy Nottingham	FOXSports; SKYSport

=== Grand final ===
Monday 28 July; 19:00 (UTC+10)	Stats	New South Wales Swifts	65–56	Waikato Bay of Plenty Magic	Acer Arena; Attendance: 12,999; Umpires: Sharon Kelly; Bronwyn Meek; Reserve umpire: Jacqui Jashari	FOXSports; SKYSport
Monday 28 July; 19:00 (UTC+10)	Stats	Scoring by quarter: 19-14, 15-14, 16-17, 15-11			Acer Arena; Attendance: 12,999; Umpires: Sharon Kelly; Bronwyn Meek; Reserve umpire: Jacqui Jashari	FOXSports; SKYSport
Monday 28 July; 19:00 (UTC+10)	Stats	Catherine Cox 41/46 (89%); Susan Pratley 24/30 (80%)		Irene van Dyk 45/46 (98%); Maria Tutaia 11/15 (73%)	Acer Arena; Attendance: 12,999; Umpires: Sharon Kelly; Bronwyn Meek; Reserve umpire: Jacqui Jashari	FOXSports; SKYSport

== Award winners ==
=== ANZ Championship awards ===
Award	Winner
Grand Final MVP	Catherine Cox

=== Australian Netball Awards ===
Award	Winner
Australian ANZ Championship Player of the Year	Catherine Cox
Australian ANZ Championship Coach of the Year	Julie Fitzgerald

=== Swifts awards ===
Award	Winner
QBE NSW Swifts MVP	Catherine Cox
NSW Swifts Members' Player of the Year	Catherine Cox
NSW Swifts Players' Player of the Year	Emma Koster
