= 2010 New South Wales Swifts season =

NSW Swifts season

New South Wales Swifts
- 2010 season
- Head coach: Julie Fitzgerald
- Asst. coach: Rob Wright
- Manager: Angela Kerr
- Captain: Catherine Cox
- Vice-captain: Kimberlee Green; Kimberley Purcell
- Main venue: Sydney Olympic Park Sports Centre

Season results
- Wins–losses: 13–2
- Regular season: 1st
- Finals placing: 3rd
- Team colours

New South Wales Swifts seasons
- ← 2009 2011 →

The 2010 New South Wales Swifts season saw New South Wales Swifts compete in the 2010 ANZ Championship. Swifts went through the entire regular season home and away undefeated, winning 13 consecutive matches and finishing as minor premiers. They were the first team in the history of the ANZ Championship to do this. However they subsequently lost both the major semi-final and the preliminary final to Adelaide Thunderbirds and Waikato Bay of Plenty Magic respectively and finished the season in third place.

== Players ==
=== Player movements ===
▲ Gains	▼ Losses
Sonia Mkoloma (Canterbury Tactix); Ashleigh Brazill (Australian Institute of Sport); Kristy Durheim (NNSW Blues); Lara Welham (Brunel Hurricanes)	Erin Bell (Adelaide Thunderbirds); Emma Koster; Ashlee Mann (NNSW Blues)

=== 2010 roster ===
2010 New South Wales Swifts roster
Players
Coaching staff

Nat.	Name	Position(s)	DoB	Height
(Australia)	Ashleigh Brazill	C, WD	29 December 1989 (aged 20)	1.75 m (5 ft 9 in)
(Australia)	Rebecca Bulley	GD, GK, WD	18 August 1982 (aged 27)	1.86 m (6 ft 1 in)
(Australia)	Catherine Cox (c)	GS, GA	24 May 1976 (aged 33)	1.88 m (6 ft 2 in)
(Australia)	Kristy Durheim	WA, C	8 July 1988 (aged 21)	1.72 m (5 ft 8 in)
(Australia)	Kimberlee Green (vc)	C, WA	5 March 1986 (aged 24)	1.76 m (5 ft 9 in)
(Australia)	Samantha May	GD, WD	16 September 1987 (aged 22)	1.83 m (6 ft 0 in)
(England)	Sonia Mkoloma	GD, GK	17 January 1979 (aged 31)	1.86 m (6 ft 1 in)
(Australia)	Susan Pratley	GA, GS	23 March 1984 (aged 25)	1.80 m (5 ft 11 in)
(Australia)	Kimberley Purcell (vc)	GD, GK, WD	18 June 1982 (aged 27)	1.82 m (6 ft 0 in)
(New Zealand)	Courtney Tairi	C, WA	15 July 1988 (aged 21)	1.81 m (5 ft 11 in)
(Australia)	Vanessa Ware	WA, C	26 October 1985 (aged 24)	1.71 m (5 ft 7 in)
(Australia)	Lara Welham	GA, GS		–
(Australia)	Amorette Wild	GA, GS, WA	10 August 1989 (aged 20)	1.78 m (5 ft 10 in)

Head coach

- (Australia) Julie Fitzgerald

Assistant coach

- (Australia) Rob Wright

Manager: Angela Kerr
Physiotherapist:
Sean Mungovan
Paula Peralta
Strength and conditioning: Bryce Cavanagh

Notes

- (c) – Captain
- (cc) – Co-captain
- (vc) – Vice-captain
- – Injury / maternity leave
- (TRP) – Temporary Replacement Player

=== Player milestones ===
- Three players made their ANZ Championship debut for Swifts during the season – Ashleigh Brazill in Round 4 against Central Pulse, Lara Welham in Round 5 against West Coast Fever and Kristy Durheim in Round 13 against Melbourne Vixens.
- Catherine Cox celebrated her 200th game in Round 13 against Melbourne Vixens.
- Susan Pratley played her 100th game in Round 4 against Central Pulse
- Kimberley Purcell played her 100th game against Adelaide Thunderbirds in the major semi-final.

== Regular season ==
Swifts went through the entire regular season home and away undefeated, winning 13 consecutive matches and finishing as minor premiers. They were the first team in the history of the ANZ Championship to do this.

=== Fixtures and results ===
Round 1

Sunday 21 March	Queensland Firebirds	47 – 50	New South Wales Swifts	Gold Coast Convention and Exhibition Centre
13:50 (UTC+10)	Romelda Aiken 29/34 (85%); Natalie Medhurst 18/23 (78%)	Report; Stats	Catherine Cox 30/38 (79%); Susan Pratley 20/27 (74%)

Round 2

Saturday 27 March	Adelaide Thunderbirds	38 – 45	New South Wales Swifts	ETSA Park
13:50 (UTC+10:30)	Erin Bell 3/3 (100%); Kate Beveridge 5/8 (63%); Carla Borrego 30/39 (77%)	Stats	Catherine Cox 26/38 (68%); Susan Pratley 19/26 (73%)

Round 3

Sunday 4 April	Canterbury Tactix	53 – 56	New South Wales Swifts	Westpac Arena
18:50 (UTC+12)	Ellen Halpenny 31/45 (69%); Anna Thompson 22/29 (76%)	Q4: (45 – 45); Report; Stats	Catherine Cox 21/36 (58%); Susan Pratley 31/36 (86%); Amorette Wild 4/6 (67%)

Round 4

Saturday 10 April	New South Wales Swifts	50 – 36	Central Pulse	Sydney Olympic Park Sports Centre
14:20 (UTC+10)	Catherine Cox 23/32 (72%); Susan Pratley 27/31 (87%)	Report; Stats	Jane Altschwager 16/22 (73%); Te Amo Amaru-Tibble 2/4 (50%); Paula Griffin 18/21 (86%)

Round 5

Sunday 18 April	New South Wales Swifts	55 – 43	West Coast Fever	Newcastle Entertainment Centre
14:50 (UTC+10)	Catherine Cox 24/34 (71%); Susan Pratley 30/35 (86%); Lara Welham 1/2 (50%)	Report; Stats	Caitlin Bassett 27/33 (82%); Leah Shoard 16/22 (73%)

Round 6

New South Wales Swifts received a bye.

Round 7

Sunday 2 May	New South Wales Swifts	56 – 42	Melbourne Vixens	Acer Arena
14:50 (UTC+10)	Catherine Cox 29/31 (94%); Susan Pratley 27/30 (90%)	Report; Stats	Sharelle McMahon 19/20 (95%); Caitlin Thwaites 23/26 (88%)	Attendance: 6,928

Round 8

Sunday 9 May	New South Wales Swifts	60 – 44	Adelaide Thunderbirds	Sydney Olympic Park Sports Centre
14:50 (UTC+10)	Catherine Cox 36/44 (82%); Susan Pratley 24/34 (71%)	Report; Stats	Erin Bell 7/10 (70%); Kate Beveridge 8/12 (67%); Carla Borrego 29/38 (76%)

Round 9

Monday 17 May	New South Wales Swifts	44 – 40	Queensland Firebirds	Sydney Olympic Park Sports Centre
19:05 (UTC+10)	Catherine Cox 19/33 (58%); Susan Pratley 25/31 (81%)	Report; Stats	Romelda Aiken 26/33 (79%); Natalie Medhurst 14/21 (67%)

Round 10

Monday 24 May	West Coast Fever	52 – 61	New South Wales Swifts	Challenge Stadium
18:05 (UTC+8)	Caitlin Bassett 38/45 (84%); Leah Shoard 14/20 (70%)	Stats	Catherine Cox 33/42 (79%); Susan Pratley 28/36 (78%)

Round 11

Saturday 29 May	Northern Mystics	48 – 54	New South Wales Swifts	Trusts Stadium
14:20 (UTC+12)	Cathrine Latu 30/33 (91%); Maria Tutaia 18/24 (75%)	Stats	Catherine Cox 26/33 (79%); Susan Pratley 28/32 (88%)

Round 12

Monday 7 June	New South Wales Swifts	60 – 43	Waikato Bay of Plenty Magic	Sydney Olympic Park Sports Centre
19:05 (UTC+10)	Catherine Cox 31/39 (79%); Susan Pratley 29/34 (85%)	Report; Stats	Jodi Brown 16/19 (84%); Irene van Dyk 27/29 (93%)

Round 13

Saturday 12 June	Melbourne Vixens	46 – 58	New South Wales Swifts	Hisense Arena
14:20 (UTC+10)	Tegan Caldwell 11/11 (100%); Sharelle McMahon 24/29 (83%); Caitlin Thwaites 11/17 (65%)	Stats	Catherine Cox 31/40 (78%); Susan Pratley 19/23 (83%); Amorette Wild 8/10 (80%)

Round 14

Monday 21 June	New South Wales Swifts	55 – 38	Southern Steel	Sydney Olympic Park Sports Centre
19:05 (UTC+10)	Catherine Cox 28/37 (76%); Susan Pratley 27/32 (84%)	Stats	Megan Dehn 13/14 (93%); Julianna Naoupu 6/7 (86%); Daneka Wipiiti 19/24 (79%)

=== Final table ===
2010 ANZ Championship ladder
Pos	Team	Pld	W	L	GF	GA	PP	Pts	Qualification
1	New South Wales Swifts	13	13	0	704	570	123.5	26	Qualified for Major semi-final
2	Adelaide Thunderbirds	13	9	4	681	586	116.2	18	Qualified for Major semi-final
3	Waikato Bay of Plenty Magic	13	9	4	682	626	108.9	18	Qualified for Minor semi-final
4	Southern Steel	13	8	5	644	597	107.9	16	Qualified for Minor semi-final
5	Queensland Firebirds	13	7	6	717	629	114.0	14	
6	Northern Mystics	13	7	6	696	702	99.1	14	
7	Melbourne Vixens	13	6	7	651	680	95.7	12	
8	West Coast Fever	13	4	9	679	718	94.6	8	
9	Central Pulse	13	1	12	594	742	80.1	2	
10	Canterbury Tactix	13	1	12	571	769	74.3	2	

Rules for classification: 2 points for a win, 0 points for a loss.

== Playoffs ==
=== Major semi-final ===
Sunday 27 June; 14:50 (UTC+10)	Stats	New South Wales Swifts	38–52	Adelaide Thunderbirds	Acer Arena; Attendance: 6,928
Sunday 27 June; 14:50 (UTC+10)	Stats	Scoring by quarter: 10-14, 8-17, 9-14, 11-7			Acer Arena; Attendance: 6,928
Sunday 27 June; 14:50 (UTC+10)	Stats	Susan Pratley 22/31 (71%); Catherine Cox 9/16 (56%); Amorette Wild 7/8 (88%)		Carla Borrego 37/43 (86%); Erin Bell 12/16 (75%); Kate Beveridge 2/2 (100%); Jasmine Keene 1/1 (100%)	Acer Arena; Attendance: 6,928

=== Preliminary final ===
Sunday 4 July; 14:50 (UTC+10)	Stats	New South Wales Swifts	49–54	Waikato Bay of Plenty Magic	Newcastle Entertainment Centre; Umpires: Sharon Kelly (Australia), Mandy Nottingham (New Zealand)
Sunday 4 July; 14:50 (UTC+10)	Stats	Scoring by quarter: 11-12, 9-17, 12-13, 17-12			Newcastle Entertainment Centre; Umpires: Sharon Kelly (Australia), Mandy Nottingham (New Zealand)
Sunday 4 July; 14:50 (UTC+10)	Stats	Catherine Cox 32/38 (84%); Susan Pratley 17/21 (81%)		Irene van Dyk 43/44 (98%); Jodi Brown 11/13 (85%)	Newcastle Entertainment Centre; Umpires: Sharon Kelly (Australia), Mandy Nottingham (New Zealand)

== Award winners ==
=== Swifts awards ===
Award	Winner
QBE NSW Swifts MVP	Rebecca Bulley
NSW Swifts Members' Player of the Year	Rebecca Bulley
Marilyn Melhuish NSW Swifts Players' Player	Rebecca Bulley/Susan Pratley
NSW Swifts Players' Player of the Year	Kimberlee Green

=== Holden Cruze award ===
Award	Winner	Team
Holden Cruze Player of the Year	(Australia) Rebecca Bulley	New South Wales Swifts
