= 2010 Adelaide Thunderbirds season =

Adelaide Thunderbirds season

Adelaide Thunderbirds
- 2010 season
- Head coach: Jane Woodlands-Thompson
- Asst. coaches: Lisa Alexander; Judy Greenwood
- Manager: Catherine Foreman
- Co-captains: Natalie von Bertouch; Mo'onia Gerrard
- Vice-captain: Sharni Layton
- Main venue: ETSA Park

Season results
- Wins–losses: 11–4
- Regular season: 2nd
- Finals placing: 1st
- Team colours

Adelaide Thunderbirds seasons
- ← 2009 2011 →

The 2010 Adelaide Thunderbirds season saw Adelaide Thunderbirds compete in the 2010 ANZ Championship. After winning nine games, Thunderbirds finished second, behind New South Wales Swifts, during the regular season. However, after defeating Swifts in the major semi-final, Thunderbirds defeated Waikato Bay of Plenty Magic 52–42 in the grand final to win their third premiership. The 2010 season was the last season that Thunderbirds played in black, white, teal and silver, the colours of their sponsors, Port Adelaide Football Club. Ahead of the 2011 season, Thunderbirds announced they were changing their team colours to pink.

== Players ==
=== Player movements ===
Summary of 2010 player movements
▲ Gains	▼ Losses
Erin Bell (New South Wales Swifts); Carla Borrego (Miami Hurricanes (basketball)); Jasmine Keene (West Coast Fever); Sharni Layton (Australian Institute of Sport)	Jane Altschwager (Central Pulse); Bianca Reddy (West Coast Fever); Natalie Medhurst (Queensland Firebirds)

=== 2010 roster ===
2010 Adelaide Thunderbirds roster
Players
Coaching staff

Nat.	Name	Position(s)	DoB	Height
(Australia)	Emily Beaton	C, WA	9 April 1987 (aged 22)	1.80 m (5 ft 11 in)
(Australia)	Georgia Beaton	GD, WD	22 June 1990 (aged 19)	1.85 m (6 ft 1 in)
(Australia)	Erin Bell	GA, WA, GS	26 October 1985 (aged 24)	1.78 m (5 ft 10 in)
(Jamaica)	Carla Borrego	GA, GS	11 November 1983 (aged 26)	1.93 m (6 ft 4 in)
(Australia)	Natalie von Bertouch (c)	C, WA, WD	16 December 1982 (aged 27)	1.75 m (5 ft 9 in)
(Australia)	Kate Beveridge	GS, GA, WA	25 July 1985 (aged 24)	1.90 m (6 ft 3 in)
(Australia)	Mo'onia Gerrard (vc)	GD, WD	15 November 1980 (aged 29)	1.80 m (5 ft 11 in)
(Australia)	Edwina Gosse			–
(Australia)	Jasmine Keene	GS, GA	14 January 1987 (aged 23)	1.91 m (6 ft 3 in)
(Australia)	Sharni Layton (vc)	GK, GD, WD	6 January 1988 (aged 22)	1.88 m (6 ft 2 in)
(England)	Geva Mentor	GK, GD, WD	17 September 1984 (aged 25)	1.91 m (6 ft 3 in)
(Australia)	Melissa Rowland	GA, GS	18 May 1989 (aged 20)	1.86 m (6 ft 1 in)
(Australia)	Beth Shimmin (TRP)		18 March 1987 (aged 23)	1.76 m (5 ft 9 in)
(Australia)	Kate Shimmin	GK, GD	13 February 1992 (aged 18)	1.85 m (6 ft 1 in)
(Australia)	Joanna Sutton (injured)	WD, C	13 July 1986 (aged 23)	1.80 m (5 ft 11 in)
(Australia)	Sheree Wingard	WA, C	18 August 1988 (aged 21)	1.70 m (5 ft 7 in)

Head coach

- (Australia) Jane Woodlands-Thompson

Assistant coaches

- (Australia) Lisa Alexander
- (Australia) Judy Greenwood

Manager:
Catherine Foreman
Physiotherapist:
Julie Knights
Fiona Black
Strength and conditioning:
Brenton Hay
Natalie Wilson
Performance Analyst:
Catherine Foreman
Doctor:
Roger Oakeshott
Sport Psychologist:
Gary Haseldine
Guest Coaches:
Vicki Wilson
Jenny Borlase

Notes

- (c) – Captain
- (cc) – Co-captain
- (vc) – Vice-captain
- – Injury / maternity leave
- (TRP) – Temporary Replacement Player

Notes

- ^1 Edwina Gosse, Jasmine Keene, Melissa Rowland, Beth Shimmin and Sheree Wingard were all members of the 2010 Southern Force squad.
- ^2 Kate Shimmin was also in the 2010 Australian Institute of Sport squad.

== Regular season ==
After winning nine games, Thunderbirds finished second, behind New South Wales Swifts, during the regular season. One of the highlights of Thunderbirds' season came in the Round 5 away match against Central Pulse when they achieved a 35-goal winning margin, a club and league record win. Carla Borrego also equalled Romelda Aiken's record for most goals scored in an ANZ Championship match.

=== Fixtures and results ===
Round 1

Saturday 20 March	Northern Mystics	55 – 52	Adelaide Thunderbirds	Trusts Stadium
14:20 (UTC+13)	Cathrine Latu 30/32 (94%); Maria Tutaia 25/30 (83%)	Report; Stats	Erin Bell 3/5 (60%); Kate Beveridge 9/14 (64%); Carla Borrego 40/48 (83%)	Umpires: Liz Boon, Mandy Nottingham, Bobbi Brown

Round 2

Saturday 27 March	Adelaide Thunderbirds	38 – 45	New South Wales Swifts	ETSA Park
13:50 (UTC+10:30)	Erin Bell 3/3 (100%); Kate Beveridge 5/8 (63%); Carla Borrego 30/39 (77%)	Stats	Catherine Cox 26/38 (68%); Susan Pratley 19/26 (73%)

Round 3

Sunday 4 April	Queensland Firebirds	40 – 41	Adelaide Thunderbirds	Brisbane Convention and Exhibition Centre
14:50 (UTC+10)	Romelda Aiken 32/41 (78%); Natalie Medhurst 8/15 (53%)	Report; Stats	Kate Beveridge 9/14 (64%); Carla Borrego 32/35 (91%)

Round 4

Sunday 11 April	Adelaide Thunderbirds	53 – 36	Southern Steel	ETSA Park
14:20 (UTC+9:30)	Kate Beveridge 16/24 (67%); Carla Borrego 37/45 (82%)	Report; Stats	Megan Dehn 7/13 (54%); Julianna Naoupu 1/1 (100%); Daneka Wipiiti 28/34 (82%)

Round 5

Saturday 17 April	Central Pulse	40 – 75	Adelaide Thunderbirds	TSB Bank Arena
14:20 (UTC+12)	Jane Altschwager 25/32 (78%); Paula Griffin 15/21 (71%)	Report; Stats	Kate Beveridge 16/19 (84%); Carla Borrego 58/59 (98%); Jasmine Keene 1/1 (100%)

Round 6

Monday 26 April	West Coast Fever	37 – 57	Adelaide Thunderbirds	Challenge Stadium
18:05 (UTC+8)	Caitlin Bassett 18/24 (75%); Janelle Lawson 3/6 (50%); Ashleigh Neal 2/4 (50%); Shoard 14/23 (61%)	Report; Stats	Kate Beveridge 15/22 (68%); Carla Borrego 42/46 (91%)

Round 7

Adelaide Thunderbirds received a bye.

Round 8

Sunday 9 May	New South Wales Swifts	60 – 44	Adelaide Thunderbirds	Sydney Olympic Park Sports Centre
14:50 (UTC+10)	Catherine Cox 36/44 (82%); Susan Pratley 24/34 (71%)	Report; Stats	Erin Bell 7/10 (70%); Kate Beveridge 8/12 (67%); Carla Borrego 29/38 (76%)

Round 9

Sunday 16 May	Adelaide Thunderbirds	58 – 47	Melbourne Vixens	ETSA Park
14:20 (UTC+9:30)	Kate Beveridge 15/21 (71%); Carla Borrego 43/50 (86%)	Report; Stats	Sharelle McMahon 21/30 (70%); Caitlin Thwaites 26/33 (79%)

Round 10

Sunday 23 May	Adelaide Thunderbirds	53 – 51	Queensland Firebirds	ETSA Park
14:20 (UTC+9:30)	Kate Beveridge 15/20 (75%); Carla Borrego 38/41 (93%)	Report; Stats	Romelda Aiken 32/39 (82%); Natalie Medhurst 19/27 (70%)

Round 11

Sunday 30 May	Adelaide Thunderbirds	58 – 34	Canterbury Tactix	ETSA Park
14:20 (UTC+9:30)	Erin Bell 5/5 (100%); Kate Beveridge 15/21 (71%); Carla Borrego 38/45 (84%)	Stats	Ellen Halpenny 21/31 (68%); Anna Thompson 13/17 (76%)

Round 12

Sunday 6 June	Melbourne Vixens	43 – 54	Adelaide Thunderbirds	Hisense Arena
14:50 (UTC+10)	Tegan Caldwell 13/17 (76%); Kathleen Knott 5/6 (83%); Sharelle McMahon 21/25 (84%); Caitlin Thwaites 4/5 (80%)	Stats	Kate Beveridge 12/16 (75%); Carla Borrego 42/48 (88%)

Round 13

Sunday 13 June	Adelaide Thunderbirds	54 – 45	West Coast Fever	Adelaide Arena
14:20 (UTC+9:30)	Erin Bell 8/12 (67%); Kate Beveridge 4/6 (67%); Carla Borrego 42/57 (74%)	Stats	Caitlin Bassett 26/36 (72%); Janelle Lawson 1/1 (100%); Leah Shoard 18/21 (86%)

Round 14

Saturday 19 June	Waikato Bay of Plenty Magic	53 – 44	Adelaide Thunderbirds	Energy Events Centre
14:20 (UTC+12)	Jodi Brown 16/17 (94%); Irene van Dyk 37/43 (86%)	Stats	Erin Bell 7/9 (78%); Kate Beveridge 11/17 (65%); Carla Borrego 26/31 (84%)

=== Final table ===
2010 ANZ Championship ladder
Pos	Team	Pld	W	L	GF	GA	PP	Pts	Qualification
1	New South Wales Swifts	13	13	0	704	570	123.5	26	Qualified for Major semi-final
2	Adelaide Thunderbirds	13	9	4	681	586	116.2	18	Qualified for Major semi-final
3	Waikato Bay of Plenty Magic	13	9	4	682	626	108.9	18	Qualified for Minor semi-final
4	Southern Steel	13	8	5	644	597	107.9	16	Qualified for Minor semi-final
5	Queensland Firebirds	13	7	6	717	629	114.0	14	
6	Northern Mystics	13	7	6	696	702	99.1	14	
7	Melbourne Vixens	13	6	7	651	680	95.7	12	
8	West Coast Fever	13	4	9	679	718	94.6	8	
9	Central Pulse	13	1	12	594	742	80.1	2	
10	Canterbury Tactix	13	1	12	571	769	74.3	2	

Rules for classification: 2 points for a win, 0 points for a loss.

== Playoffs ==
Semifinals
27 June – Sydney
New South Wales Swifts	38
Adelaide Thunderbirds	52
28 June – Auckland
Waikato Bay of Plenty Magic	50
Southern Steel	42

Preliminary final
4 July – Newcastle
New South Wales Swifts	49
Waikato Bay of Plenty Magic	54

Grand final
11 July – Adelaide
Adelaide Thunderbirds	52
Waikato Bay of Plenty Magic	42

=== Major semi-final ===
Sunday 27 June; 14:50 (UTC+10)	Stats	New South Wales Swifts	38–52	Adelaide Thunderbirds	Acer Arena; Attendance: 6,928
Sunday 27 June; 14:50 (UTC+10)	Stats	Scoring by quarter: 10-14, 8-17, 9-14, 11-7			Acer Arena; Attendance: 6,928
Sunday 27 June; 14:50 (UTC+10)	Stats	Susan Pratley 22/31 (71%); Catherine Cox 9/16 (56%); Amorette Wild 7/8 (88%)		Carla Borrego 37/43 (86%); Erin Bell 12/16 (75%); Kate Beveridge 2/2 (100%); Jasmine Keene 1/1 (100%)	Acer Arena; Attendance: 6,928

=== Minor semi-final ===
Monday 28 June; 19:20 (UTC+12)	Stats	Waikato Bay of Plenty Magic	50–42	Southern Steel	Vector Arena; Umpires: Sharon Kelly (Australia), Mandy Nottingham (New Zealand)
Monday 28 June; 19:20 (UTC+12)	Stats	Scoring by quarter: 16-8, 8-13, 14-11, 12-10			Vector Arena; Umpires: Sharon Kelly (Australia), Mandy Nottingham (New Zealand)
Monday 28 June; 19:20 (UTC+12)	Stats	Irene van Dyk 41/46 (89%); Jodi Brown 9/11 (82%)		Megan Dehn 24/25 (96%); Daneka Wipiiti 11/17 (65%); Julianna Naoupu 7/9 (78%)	Vector Arena; Umpires: Sharon Kelly (Australia), Mandy Nottingham (New Zealand)

=== Preliminary final ===
Sunday 4 July; 14:50 (UTC+10)	Stats	New South Wales Swifts	49–54	Waikato Bay of Plenty Magic	Newcastle Entertainment Centre; Umpires: Sharon Kelly (Australia), Mandy Nottingham (New Zealand)
Sunday 4 July; 14:50 (UTC+10)	Stats	Scoring by quarter: 11-12, 9-17, 12-13, 17-12			Newcastle Entertainment Centre; Umpires: Sharon Kelly (Australia), Mandy Nottingham (New Zealand)
Sunday 4 July; 14:50 (UTC+10)	Stats	Catherine Cox 32/38 (84%); Susan Pratley 17/21 (81%)		Irene van Dyk 43/44 (98%); Jodi Brown 11/13 (85%)	Newcastle Entertainment Centre; Umpires: Sharon Kelly (Australia), Mandy Nottingham (New Zealand)

=== Grand final ===
Sunday 11 July; 14:30 (UTC+9:30)	Stats	Adelaide Thunderbirds	52–42	Waikato Bay of Plenty Magic	Adelaide Entertainment Centre; Attendance: 9,300; Umpires: Sharon Kelly (Australia), Mandy Nottingham (New Zealand)
Sunday 11 July; 14:30 (UTC+9:30)	Stats	Scoring by quarter: 15-8, 13-13, 11-8, 13-13			Adelaide Entertainment Centre; Attendance: 9,300; Umpires: Sharon Kelly (Australia), Mandy Nottingham (New Zealand)
Sunday 11 July; 14:30 (UTC+9:30)	Stats	Carla Borrego 40/46 (87%); Erin Bell 12/19 (63%)		Irene van Dyk 30/33 (91%); Jodi Brown 12/16 (75%)	Adelaide Entertainment Centre; Attendance: 9,300; Umpires: Sharon Kelly (Australia), Mandy Nottingham (New Zealand)

=== Major semi-final ===
Sunday 27 June; 14:50 (UTC+10)	Stats	New South Wales Swifts	38–52	Adelaide Thunderbirds	Acer Arena; Attendance: 6,928
Sunday 27 June; 14:50 (UTC+10)	Stats	Scoring by quarter: 10-14, 8-17, 9-14, 11-7			Acer Arena; Attendance: 6,928
Sunday 27 June; 14:50 (UTC+10)	Stats	Susan Pratley 22/31 (71%); Catherine Cox 9/16 (56%); Amorette Wild 7/8 (88%)		Carla Borrego 37/43 (86%); Erin Bell 12/16 (75%); Kate Beveridge 2/2 (100%); Jasmine Keene 1/1 (100%)	Acer Arena; Attendance: 6,928

=== Grand final ===
Sunday 11 July; 14:30 (UTC+9:30)	Stats	Adelaide Thunderbirds	52–42	Waikato Bay of Plenty Magic	Adelaide Entertainment Centre; Attendance: 9,300; Umpires: Sharon Kelly (Australia), Mandy Nottingham (New Zealand)
Sunday 11 July; 14:30 (UTC+9:30)	Stats	Scoring by quarter: 15-8, 13-13, 11-8, 13-13			Adelaide Entertainment Centre; Attendance: 9,300; Umpires: Sharon Kelly (Australia), Mandy Nottingham (New Zealand)
Sunday 11 July; 14:30 (UTC+9:30)	Stats	Carla Borrego 40/46 (87%); Erin Bell 12/19 (63%)		Irene van Dyk 30/33 (91%); Jodi Brown 12/16 (75%)	Adelaide Entertainment Centre; Attendance: 9,300; Umpires: Sharon Kelly (Australia), Mandy Nottingham (New Zealand)

== Gallery ==
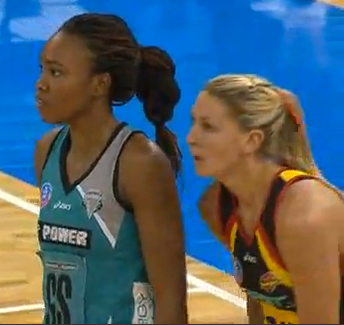
11 July 2010; Carla Borrego playing for Adelaide Thunderbirds against Waikato Bay of Plenty Magic in the 2010 ANZ Championship grand final.

== Award winners ==
=== Thunderbirds awards ===
Award	Winner
Thunderbirds MVP	Natalie von Bertouch
The Advertiser Player of the Year	Natalie von Bertouch
Tanya Denver Medal	Natalie von Bertouch/Carla Borrego
Thunderbirds Players Player	Natalie von Bertouch

=== ANZ Championship awards ===
Award	Winner
ANZ Championship Grand Final MVP	Geva Mentor
Best Young Player Award	Sharni Layton

=== Australian Netball Awards ===
Award	Winner
Liz Ellis Diamond	Natalie von Bertouch
Australian ANZ Championship Player of the Year	Natalie von Bertouch
Australian ANZ Championship Coach of the Year	Jane Woodlands-Thompson
