= 2013 Constellation Cup =

International netball series

Tournament details
- Host countries: Australia; New Zealand
- Dates: 15 September–13 October 2013

Final positions
- Champions: Australia (3rd title)
- Runners-up: New Zealand

Tournament statistics
- Matches played: 5
- Top scorer(s): Caitlin Bassett; 163/179 (91%)

The 2013 Constellation Cup was the 4th Constellation Cup series played between Australia and New Zealand. The series, also known as the New World Netball Series, featured five netball test matches, played in September and October 2013. The Australia team was coached by Lisa Alexander and captained by Laura Geitz. New Zealand were coached by Waimarama Taumaunu and captained by Casey Kopua. New Zealand won the opening match before Australia leveled the series. After winning the third test, Australia took a 2–1 series lead. Australia clinched the series with a 52–47 win in the fourth test. After winning the fifth test, Australia finished 4–1 series winners.

== Squads ==
=== Australia ===
Australia roster
Players
Coaches

Name	Pos	DOB	Height	Club	Nat	Caps
Caitlin Bassett	GS	23 May 1988 (aged 25)	1.96 m (6 ft 5 in)	West Coast Fever
Erin Bell	GA, WA, GS	26 October 1985 (aged 27)	1.78 m (5 ft 10 in)	Adelaide Thunderbirds
Madison Browne	WA, C	5 January 1988 (aged 25)	1.68 m (5 ft 6 in)	Melbourne Vixens
Rebecca Bulley	GD, GK, WD	18 August 1982 (aged 31)	1.86 m (6 ft 1 in)	Adelaide Thunderbirds
Bianca Chatfield (vc)	GK, GD, WD	2 April 1982 (aged 31)	1.89 m (6 ft 2 in)	Melbourne Vixens
Laura Geitz (c)	GK, GD	4 November 1987 (aged 25)	1.85 m (6 ft 1 in)	Queensland Firebirds
Kimberlee Green	C, WA	5 March 1986 (aged 27)	1.76 m (5 ft 9 in)	New South Wales Swifts
Renae Hallinan	WD, C	18 July 1986 (aged 27)	1.78 m (5 ft 10 in)	Adelaide Thunderbirds
Sharni Layton	GK, GD, WD	6 January 1988 (aged 25)	1.88 m (6 ft 2 in)	Adelaide Thunderbirds
Natalie Medhurst	GA, GS	20 January 1984 (aged 29)	1.78 m (5 ft 10 in)	Queensland Firebirds
Kim Ravaillion	C, WD, WA	26 July 1993 (aged 20)	1.75 m (5 ft 9 in)	Queensland Firebirds
Caitlin Thwaites	GS, GA	29 December 1986 (aged 26)	1.88 m (6 ft 2 in)	Central Pulse

Head coach

- Lisa Alexander

Assistant coach

- Julie Fitzgerald ?

Notes

- (c) – Captain
- (cc) – Co-captain
- (vc) – Vice-captain
- – Injury / maternity leave
- (TRP) – Temporary Replacement Player

=== New Zealand ===
New Zealand roster
Players
Coaches

Name	Pos	DOB	Height	Club	Nat	Caps
Jodi Brown	GA, GS	6 May 1981 (aged 32)	1.85 m (6 ft 1 in)	Southern Steel
Leana de Bruin	GD, GK	9 July 1977 (aged 36)	1.90 m (6 ft 3 in)	Waikato Bay of Plenty Magic
Irene van Dyk	GS, GA	21 June 1972 (aged 41)	1.90 m (6 ft 3 in)	Waikato Bay of Plenty Magic
Shannon Francois	WA, C, GA	12 October 1990 (aged 22)	1.76 m (5 ft 9 in)	Southern Steel
Katrina Grant	GK, GD, WD	6 May 1987 (aged 26)	1.87 m (6 ft 2 in)	Central Pulse
Joline Henry	GD, WD	29 September 1982 (aged 30)	1.83 m (6 ft 0 in)	Northern Mystics
Casey Kopua (c) (injured)	GD, GK	19 June 1985 (aged 28)	1.88 m (6 ft 2 in)	Waikato Bay of Plenty Magic
Laura Langman	C, WD	16 April 1986 (aged 27)	1.73 m (5 ft 8 in)	Waikato Bay of Plenty Magic
Cathrine Latu	GS, GA	25 October 1986 (aged 26)	1.89 m (6 ft 2 in)	Northern Mystics
Te Huinga Reo Selby-Rickit	GK, GD	3 April 1989 (aged 24)	1.84 m (6 ft 0 in)	Central Pulse
Courtney Tairi	C, WA	15 July 1988 (aged 25)	1.81 m (5 ft 11 in)	Southern Steel
Anna Thompson	GA, GS	18 June 1986 (aged 27)	1.76 m (5 ft 9 in)	Canterbury Tactix
Maria Tutaia	GA, GS	18 February 1987 (aged 26)	1.88 m (6 ft 2 in)	Northern Mystics

Head coach

- Waimarama Taumaunu

Assistant coach

- Vicki Wilson

Physiotherapist:
Sharon Kearney
Performance Analyst
Dr Bobby Willcox
Operations Manager
Esther Molloy

Notes

- (c) – Captain
- (cc) – Co-captain
- (vc) – Vice-captain
- – Injury / maternity leave
- (TRP) – Temporary Replacement Player

Debuts

- Courtney Tairi made her senior debut for New Zealand in the first test on 15 September 2013.
- Shannon Francois made her senior debut for New Zealand in the third test on 4 October 2013.

== Matches ==
=== New World Netball Series ===
==== First test ====
15 September 2013	New Zealand	55–51	Australia	SIT Zero Fees Velodrome; Attendance: 2,700
15 September 2013	Scoring by quarter: 19–14, 31–29, 45–37, 55–51			SIT Zero Fees Velodrome; Attendance: 2,700
15 September 2013	Irene van Dyk 27/29 (93%); Maria Tutaia 28/36 (78%)		Caitlin Bassett 31/31 (100%); Erin Bell 15/18 (83%); Natalie Medhurst 5/6 (83%)	SIT Zero Fees Velodrome; Attendance: 2,700

==== Second test ====
19 September 2013	New Zealand	45–47	Australia	Vector Arena
19 September 2013	Scoring by quarter: 12–12, 22–22, 31–36, 45–47			Vector Arena
19 September 2013	Irene van Dyk 25/29 (86%); Maria Tutaia 20/30 (67%)		Caitlin Bassett 32/36 (89%); Natalie Medhurst 15/20 (75%)	Vector Arena

==== Third test ====
4 October 2013	Australia	58–50	New Zealand	Adelaide Entertainment Centre
4 October 2013	Scoring by quarter: 15–13, 30–24, 47–34, 58–50			Adelaide Entertainment Centre
4 October 2013	Caitlin Bassett 40/43 (93%); Natalie Medhurst 18/19 (95%)		Maria Tutaia 23; Irene van Dyk 18/19 (95%); Cathrine Latu 9	Adelaide Entertainment Centre

==== Fourth test ====
7 October 2013	Australia	52–47	New Zealand	Rod Laver Arena
7 October 2013	Scoring by quarter: 12–10, 26–21, 41–31, 52–47			Rod Laver Arena
7 October 2013	Caitlin Bassett 40/44 (91%); Natalie Medhurst 12/14 (86%)		Maria Tutaia 26/32 (81%); Cathrine Latu 21/25 (84%)	Rod Laver Arena

==== Fifth test ====
13 October 2013	Australia	50–49	New Zealand	AIS Arena
13 October 2013	Scoring by quarter: 13–10, 23–26, 32–32, 50–49			AIS Arena
13 October 2013	Caitlin Bassett 20/25 (80%); Caitlin Thwaites 17/19 (89%); Natalie Medhurst 10/13 (77%); Erin Bell 3/3 (100%)		Catherine Latu 25/27 (93%); Maria Tutaia 24/33 (73%)	AIS Arena
