= 2011 New South Wales Swifts season =

NSW Swifts season

New South Wales Swifts
- 2011 season
- Head coach: Julie Fitzgerald
- Asst. coach: Rob Wright
- Manager: Angela Kerr
- Captain: Catherine Cox
- Vice-captain: Kimberlee Green; Kimberley Smith
- Main venue: Sydney Olympic Park Sports Centre

Season results
- Wins–losses: 9–5
- Regular season: 3rd
- Finals placing: 4th
- Team colours

New South Wales Swifts seasons
- ← 2010 2012 →

The 2011 New South Wales Swifts season saw New South Wales Swifts compete in the 2011 ANZ Championship. During the regular season, Swifts finished in third place. They qualified for the playoffs but subsequently lost to Northern Mystics in the minor semi-final, finishing the season in 4th place. After fifteen seasons as Sydney Swifts/New South Wales Swifts head coach, this was the last season Julie Fitzgerald served as head coach. Following a controversial "internal review", Fitzgerald was replaced as head coach by Lisa Beehag. The review was conducted during the 2011 season. Catherine Cox and Liz Ellis publicly criticized Netball New South Wales for distracting players with the review and even alleged that it was responsible for Swifts losing the 2011 minor semi-final.

== Players ==
=== Player movements ===
▲ Gains	▼ Losses
Mo'onia Gerrard (Adelaide Thunderbirds); Carla Dziwoki (Leeds Carnegie); Melissa Tallent (NNSW Waratahs)	Kristy Durheim (NNSW Waratahs); Samantha May (NNSW Waratahs); Lara Welham

=== Roster ===
2011 New South Wales Swifts roster
Players
Coaching staff

Nat.	Name	Position(s)	DoB	Height
(Australia)	Ashleigh Brazill	C, WD	29 December 1989 (aged 21)	1.75 m (5 ft 9 in)
(Australia)	Rebecca Bulley	GD, GK, WD	18 August 1982 (aged 28)	1.86 m (6 ft 1 in)
(Australia)	Catherine Cox (c)	GS, GA	24 May 1976 (aged 34)	1.88 m (6 ft 2 in)
(Australia)	Carla Dziwoki (injured)	GS, GA	29 August 1982 (aged 28)	1.86 m (6 ft 1 in)
(Australia)	Mo'onia Gerrard	GD, WD	15 November 1980 (aged 30)	1.80 m (5 ft 11 in)
(Australia)	Kimberlee Green (vc)	C, WA	5 March 1986 (aged 24)	1.76 m (5 ft 9 in)
(England)	Sonia Mkoloma	GD, GK	17 January 1979 (aged 32)	1.86 m (6 ft 1 in)
(Australia)	Susan Pratley	GA, GS	23 March 1984 (aged 26)	1.80 m (5 ft 11 in)
(Australia)	Kimberley Smith (vc)	GD, GK, WD	18 June 1982 (aged 28)	1.82 m (6 ft 0 in)
(Australia)	Melissa Tallent (TRP)	GS, GA	4 February 1991 (aged 21)	1.87 m (6 ft 2 in)
(New Zealand)	Courtney Tairi	C, WA	15 July 1988 (aged 22)	1.81 m (5 ft 11 in)
(Australia)	Vanessa Ware	WA, C	26 October 1985 (aged 25)	1.71 m (5 ft 7 in)
(Australia)	Amorette Wild	GA, GS, WA	10 August 1989 (aged 21)	1.78 m (5 ft 10 in)

Head coach

- (Australia) Julie Fitzgerald

Assistant coach

- (Australia) Robert Wright

Manager: Angela Kerr
Physiotherapist:
Sean Mungovan
Paula Peralta
Strength and conditioning: Bryce Cavanagh

Notes

- (c) – Captain
- (cc) – Co-captain
- (vc) – Vice-captain
- – Injury / maternity leave
- (TRP) – Temporary Replacement Player

=== Milestones ===
- Carla Dziwoki, made her Swifts debut in the fourth quarter of the Round 1 match against Adelaide Thunderbirds, scoring 11 goals from 11 attempts.
- Kimberlee Green celebrated her 100th senior league game in Round 2 against Queensland Firebirds.
- Mo'onia Gerrard celebrated her 150th senior league game in Round 5 against Canterbury Tactix.

== Pre-season ==
NSW Swifts Tournament

On 22–23 January, New South Wales Swifts hosted and won a tournament at Sydney Olympic Park Sports Centre. The other participants included Melbourne Vixens, Adelaide Thunderbirds, West Coast Fever

Five Quarter series

On 29–30 January, Northern Mystics and New South Wales Swifts played two five-quarter matches.

29 January	Northern Mystics	61–64	New South Wales Swifts	Auckland

30 January	Northern Mystics	61–52	New South Wales Swifts	Auckland

== Regular season ==
=== Fixtures and results ===
Round 1

13 February	New South Wales Swifts	60 – 40	Adelaide Thunderbirds	Sydney Olympic Park Sports Centre
12:20 (UTC+13)	Catherine Cox 22/29 (76%); Carla Dziwoki 11/11 (100%); Susan Pratley 27/27 (100%)	Report; Stats	Erin Bell 5/8 (63%); Carla Borrego 31/35 (89%); Bianca Giteau 4/6 (67%)

Round 2

Mon 21 February	Queensland Firebirds	51 – 48	New South Wales Swifts	Brisbane Convention and Exhibition Centre
18:40 (UTC+10)	Romelda Aiken 28/37 (76%); Natalie Medhurst 23/26 (88%)	Report; Stats	Catherine Cox 27/34 (79%); Susan Pratley 21/25 (84%)

Round 3

Sun 27 February	New South Wales Swifts	45–49	Melbourne Vixens	Sydney Olympic Park Sports Centre
14:20 (UTC+10)	Catherine Cox 11/15 (73%); Carla Dziwoki 14/16 (88%); Susan Pratley 20/26 (77%)	Report; Stats	Kate Beveridge 29/38 (76%); Sharelle McMahon 20/25 (80%)

Round 4

Mon 7 March	New South Wales Swifts	55 – 51	West Coast Fever	Sydney Olympic Park Sports Centre
19:40 (UTC+11)	Catherine Cox 22/38 (58%); Susan Pratley 33/40 (83%)	Report; Stats	Caitlin Bassett 43/50 (86%); Leah Shoard 8/12 (67%)

Round 5

Mon 14 March	New South Wales Swifts	54 – 45	Canterbury Tactix	Sydney Olympic Park Sports Centre
19:40 (UTC+11)	Catherine Cox 27/37 (73%); Susan Pratley 17/20 (85%); Amorette Wild 10/12 (83%)	Report; Stats	Ellen Halpenny 21/25 (84%); Donna Wilkins 24/25 (96%)

Round 6

Thu 17 March	West Coast Fever	49 – 70	New South Wales Swifts	Challenge Stadium
19:10 (UTC+8)	Caitlin Bassett 30/34 (88%); Leah Shoard 19/24 (79%)	Report; Stats	Catherine Cox 29/35 (83%); Carla Dziwoki 14/15 (93%); Susan Pratley 27/31 (87%)

Sun 20 March	New South Wales Swifts	53 – 57	Queensland Firebirds	Sydney Olympic Park Sports Centre
14:20 (UTC+11)	Catherine Cox 31/36 (86%); Susan Pratley 22/25 (88%)	Report; Stats	Romelda Aiken 37/43 (86%); Natalie Medhurst 20/25 (80%)

Round 7

Sun 27 March	Central Pulse	43 – 48	New South Wales Swifts	TSB Bank Arena
18:20 (UTC+13)	Te Amo Amaru-Tibble 2/2 (100%); Amber Bellringer 8/15 (53%); Caitlin Thwaites 33/43 (77%)	Report; Stats	Catherine Cox 23/32 (72%); Susan Pratley 25/29 (86%)

Round 8

New South Wales Swifts received a bye.

Round 9

Mon 11 April	Waikato Bay of Plenty Magic	46 – 53	New South Wales Swifts	Queen Elizabeth Youth Centre
19:40 (UTC+12)	Irene van Dyk 28/30 (93%); Jamilah Gupwell 10/13 (77%); Julianna Naoupu 8/8 (100%)	Report; Stats	Catherine Cox 31/36 (86%); Amorette Wild 3/4 (75%); Susan Pratley 19/26 (73%)

Round 10

Sat 16 April	Adelaide Thunderbirds	57 – 53	New South Wales Swifts	ETSA Park
13:50 (UTC+9:30)	Erin Bell 19/23 (83%); Carla Borrego 38/40 (95%)	Report; Stats	Catherine Cox 34/40 (85%); Carla Dziwoki 3/3 (100%); Susan Pratley 16/24 (67%)

Mon 18 April	New South Wales Swifts	53 – 46	Northern Mystics	Sydney Olympic Park Sports Centre
19:40 (UTC+10)	Catherine Cox 37/48 (77%); Susan Pratley 16/23 (70%)	Report; Stats	Megan Dehn 2/2 (100%); Cathrine Latu 17/17 (100%); Bailey Mes 1/4 (25%); Maria Tutaia 26/29 (90%)

Round 11

Thu 21 April	Southern Steel	39 – 40	New South Wales Swifts	Edgar Centre
19:40 (UTC+12)	Paula Griffin 16/23 (70%); Daneka Wipiiti 23/35 (66%)	Report; Stats	Catherine Cox 25/33 (76%); Susan Pratley 15/19 (79%)

Round 12

Sun 1 May	Melbourne Vixens	33 – 45	New South Wales Swifts	Hisense Arena
14:20 (UTC+10)	Kate Beveridge 8/14 (57%); Tegan Caldwell 16/21 (76%); Kathleen Knott 9/14 (64%)	Report; Stats	Catherine Cox 33/42 (79%); Susan Pratley 12/15 (80%)

=== Standings ===
2011 ANZ Championship ladder
Pos	Team	Pld	W	L	GF	GA	GD	G%	Pts
1	Queensland Firebirds	13	13	0	758	587	171	129.13	26
2	Waikato Bay of Plenty Magic	13	10	3	647	578	69	111.94	20
3	New South Wales Swifts	13	9	4	677	606	71	111.72	18
4	Northern Mystics	13	9	4	684	619	65	110.5	18
5	Melbourne Vixens	13	8	5	664	610	54	108.85	16
6	Adelaide Thunderbirds	13	5	8	662	737	-75	89.82	10
7	Southern Steel	13	4	9	533	594	-61	89.73	8
8	Central Pulse	13	3	10	599	683	-84	87.7	6
9	West Coast Fever	13	3	10	646	754	-108	85.68	6
10	Canterbury Tactix	13	1	12	621	723	-102	85.89	2
Updated 8 March 2021

Qualified for Major semi-final
Qualified for Minor semi-final

- Pld = Games played
- W = Win (2 points)
- L = Loss (0 points)
- GF = Goals For
- GA = Goals Against
- GD = Goals Difference (= GF−GA)
- G% = Goal percentage (= 100 × GF/GA)

Pts = Points

== Finals ==
Semifinals
9 May – Gold Coast
Queensland Firebirds	50
Waikato Bay of Plenty Magic	39
8 May – Sydney
New South Wales Swifts	44
Northern Mystics	49

Preliminary final
15 May – Hamilton
Waikato Bay of Plenty Magic	42
Northern Mystics	43

Grand final
22 May – Brisbane
Queensland Firebirds	57
Northern Mystics	44

=== Minor semifinal ===
Sunday 8 May; 14:20 (UTC+10)	New South Wales Swifts	44–49	Northern Mystics	Sydney Olympic Park Sports Centre; Umpires: Rachael Ayre (Australia); Mandy Nottingham (New Zealand); Reserve umpire: Jemma Carlton (Australia)	TEN; SKYSport
Sunday 8 May; 14:20 (UTC+10)	Scoring by quarter: 11-15, 9-13, 11–10, 13-11			Sydney Olympic Park Sports Centre; Umpires: Rachael Ayre (Australia); Mandy Nottingham (New Zealand); Reserve umpire: Jemma Carlton (Australia)	TEN; SKYSport
Sunday 8 May; 14:20 (UTC+10)	Catherine Cox 28/36 (78%); Amorette Wild 8/8 (100%); Susan Pratley 8/10 (80%)		Cathrine Latu 25/28 (89%); Maria Tutaia 24/29 (83%)	Sydney Olympic Park Sports Centre; Umpires: Rachael Ayre (Australia); Mandy Nottingham (New Zealand); Reserve umpire: Jemma Carlton (Australia)	TEN; SKYSport

=== Major semifinal ===
Monday 9 May; 19:40 (UTC+10)	Stats	Queensland Firebirds	50–39	Waikato Bay of Plenty Magic	Gold Coast Convention and Exhibition Centre	TEN; SKYSport
Monday 9 May; 19:40 (UTC+10)	Stats	Scoring by quarter: 12–8, 11-8, 16–10, 11-13			Gold Coast Convention and Exhibition Centre	TEN; SKYSport
Monday 9 May; 19:40 (UTC+10)	Stats	Romelda Aiken 29/33 (88%); Natalie Medhurst 21/27 (78%)		Irene van Dyk 17/19 (89%); Jamilah Gupwell 16/18 (89%); Julianna Naoupu 6/8 (75%)	Gold Coast Convention and Exhibition Centre	TEN; SKYSport

=== Preliminary final ===
Sunday 15 May; 18:20 (UTC+12)	Stats	Waikato Bay of Plenty Magic	42–43	Northern Mystics	Mystery Creek Events Centre	TEN; SKYSport
Sunday 15 May; 18:20 (UTC+12)	Stats	Scoring by quarter: 13–9, 7-16, 12–10, 10-8			Mystery Creek Events Centre	TEN; SKYSport
Sunday 15 May; 18:20 (UTC+12)	Stats	Irene van Dyk 27/28 (96%); Julianna Naoupu 14/19 (74%); Jamilah Gupwell 1/3 (33%)		Cathrine Latu 15/17 (88%); Maria Tutaia 28/30 (93%)	Mystery Creek Events Centre	TEN; SKYSport

=== Grand final ===
Sunday 22 May; 14:30 (UTC+10)	Stats	Queensland Firebirds	57–44	Northern Mystics	Brisbane Convention & Exhibition Centre; Attendance: 3,541; Umpires: Sharon Kelly (Australia); Mandy Nottingham (New Zealand); Reserve umpire: Rachael Ayre (Australia)	TEN; SKYSport
Sunday 22 May; 14:30 (UTC+10)	Stats	Scoring by quarter: 12–12, 14–12, 18–8, 13-12			Brisbane Convention & Exhibition Centre; Attendance: 3,541; Umpires: Sharon Kelly (Australia); Mandy Nottingham (New Zealand); Reserve umpire: Rachael Ayre (Australia)	TEN; SKYSport
Sunday 22 May; 14:30 (UTC+10)	Stats	Romelda Aiken 35/40 (88%); Natalie Medhurst 22/24 (92%)		Cathrine Latu 21/21 (100%); Maria Tutaia 23/31 (74%)	Brisbane Convention & Exhibition Centre; Attendance: 3,541; Umpires: Sharon Kelly (Australia); Mandy Nottingham (New Zealand); Reserve umpire: Rachael Ayre (Australia)	TEN; SKYSport

=== Minor semifinal ===
Sunday 8 May; 14:20 (UTC+10)	Stats	New South Wales Swifts	44–49	Northern Mystics	Sydney Olympic Park Sports Centre; Umpires: Rachael Ayre (Australia); Mandy Nottingham (New Zealand); Reserve umpire: Jemma Carlton (Australia)	TEN; SKYSport
Sunday 8 May; 14:20 (UTC+10)	Stats	Scoring by quarter: 11-15, 9-13, 11–10, 13-11			Sydney Olympic Park Sports Centre; Umpires: Rachael Ayre (Australia); Mandy Nottingham (New Zealand); Reserve umpire: Jemma Carlton (Australia)	TEN; SKYSport
Sunday 8 May; 14:20 (UTC+10)	Stats	Catherine Cox 28/36 (78%); Amorette Wild 8/8 (100%); Susan Pratley 8/10 (80%)		Cathrine Latu 25/28 (89%); Maria Tutaia 24/29 (83%)	Sydney Olympic Park Sports Centre; Umpires: Rachael Ayre (Australia); Mandy Nottingham (New Zealand); Reserve umpire: Jemma Carlton (Australia)	TEN; SKYSport

== Statistics ==
Player	GS	GA	G%	A	R	CPR	I	D	P	T
Ashleigh Brazill	0	0	0	11	0	8	7	5	10	8
Rebecca Bulley	0	0	0	4	16	93	11	40	115	15
Catherine Cox	380	490	77.6	22	13	0	0	6	24	40
Carla Dziwoki	42	45	93.3	7	3	4	0	0	2	3
Mo'onia Gerrard	0	0	0	6	6	58	10	36	118	23
Kimberlee Green	0	0	0	197	1	144	10	23	96	36
Sonia Mkoloma	0	0	0	0	19	0	30	41	200	20
Susan Pratley	278	340	81.8	75	26	200	3	9	39	33
Kimberley Smith	0	0	0	0	0	36	6	15	58	4
Courtney Tairi	0	0	0	52	10	10	5	24	37	6
Melissa Tallent	0	0	0	0	0	0	0	0	0	0
Vanessa Ware	0	0	0	60	0	75	0	7	32	10
Amorette Wild	21	24	87.5	8	0	18	1	1	3	2

Statistics key
GS	Goals scored	A	Assists	I	Intercepts
GA	Goal attempts	R	Rebounds	D	Deflections
G%	Goal percentage	CPR	Centre pass receives	P	Penalties
= Competition leader				T	Turnovers conceded

== Award winners ==
=== Swifts awards ===
Award	Winner
QBE NSW Swifts MVP	Catherine Cox
NSW Swifts Members' Player of the Year	Kimberlee Green
NSW Swifts Players' Player of the Year	Kimberley Smith
