= Courtney Tairi =

New Zealand netball international

Personal information
- Full name: Courtney Reremoana Tairi
- Born: 15 July 1988 (age 38) Sydney, Australia
- Height: 1.81 m (5 ft 11 1/2 in)

Netball career
- Playing positions: C, WA
Years	Club team	Apps
2007	Hunter Jaegers	
2008–2009	Australian Institute of Sport	
2009–2011	New South Wales Swifts	
2012–2013	Southern Steel	
2014–2016	Waikato Bay of Plenty Magic	
2017	Northern Stars	
Years	National team	Caps
2008–2009	Australia U-21	
2013	New Zealand	3
Medal record
Representing Australia
World Youth Netball Championships
Gold medal – first place	2009 Rarotonga	Team
Representing New Zealand
Fast5 Netball World Series
Gold medal – first place	2013 Auckland	Team

Courtney Tairi (born 15 July 1988) is a former New Zealand netball international. She also represented Australia at under-21 level. She was a member of the Australia team that won the 2009 World Youth Netball Championships. During the ANZ Championship era, Tairi played for New South Wales Swifts, Southern Steel and Waikato Bay of Plenty Magic. She finished her netball playing career with Northern Stars in the 2017 ANZ Premiership. Since retiring as a netball player, Tairi has worked a broadcaster, presenter and commentator for Sky Sport (New Zealand).

== Early life, family and education ==
Tairi was born and raised in Sydney, New South Wales. Her parents were originally from New Zealand. Her father is a Māori from Cambridge. Her tribe is Tainui and her sub-tribe is Ngāti Korokī Kahukura. Her mother is a Pākehā from Invercargill. She has two sisters. She regularly spent family holidays in New Zealand. Tairi is both an Australian and New Zealand citizen. Between 2004 and 2005 she attended the Western Sydney Academy of Sport.

== Playing career ==
=== Early years ===
Tairi began playing netball aged 7. She played competitively throughout her school years. She was first spotted by Julie Fitzgerald, her future coach at New South Wales Swifts and Waikato Bay of Plenty Magic, when she was 14. In 2007 she was included in the Hunter Jaegers squad for the final season of the Commonwealth Bank Trophy era.

=== New South Wales ===
In 2007 and 2009, Tairi represented New South Wales in the Australian National Netball Championships at under-19 and under-21 levels. She was captain of the under-21 team that won seven of their eight games as they won the 2009 under-21 title.

=== Australian Institute of Sport ===
Between 2008 and 2009, Tairi played for the Australian Institute of Sport in the Australian Netball League. In both 2008 and 2009, she was a member of AIS teams that finished as runners up to Victoria Fury. In 2009 she won the Anne Clark Award. While playing for AIS, she also represented Australia at under-21 level.

=== New South Wales Swifts ===
Between 2009 and 2011, Tairi played for New South Wales Swifts. She made her senior Swifts debut in a 2009 ANZ Championship Round 14 match against Southern Steel. In 2010, Tairi played nine games for the Swifts, helping them win the 2010 ANZ Championship minor premiership.

=== Southern Steel ===
In 2012 and 2013, Tairi played for Southern Steel. She was eligible to play for Steel as a non-import player. Steel co-coach Natalie Avellino made the initial approach, inviting Tairi to play for Steel. In a 2012 Round 7 match against Northern Mystics, she suffered a season ending ACL injury.

=== Waikato Bay of Plenty Magic ===
Between 2014 and 2016, Tairi played for Waikato Bay of Plenty Magic. In a 2015 Round 1 match against Adelaide Thunderbirds, she suffered an achilles tendon rupture, ending her season after just one match. It was the third major injury of Tairi's career, following a 2007 knee injury her 2012 ACL injury. She returned to play for Magic in 2016 and was a member of the team that won the New Zealand Conference.

=== Northern Stars ===
Tairi finished her netball playing career with Northern Stars in the 2017 ANZ Premiership. She was named as vice captain to Leana de Bruin for the new franchise.

=== International career ===
==== Australia ====
In 2008 and 2009, Tairi was included in Australia under-21 squads. She was a member of the Australia U-21 team that won the 2009 World Youth Netball Championships and she was vice-captain of an Australia U-21 team during a tour of Jamaica.

==== New Zealand ====
In 2013, Tairi made three senior appearances for New Zealand. On 15 September 2013, she made her senior debut for New Zealand against Australia in the first test of the 2013 Constellation Cup. She was also a member of the New Zealand team that won the 2013 Fast5 Netball World Series. Tairi was included in the 2014–15 New Zealand squad. However injuries prevented her from making more appearances.

Tournaments	Place	Teams
2009 World Youth Netball Championships	1st place, gold medalist(s)	Australia
2013 Constellation Cup	2nd	New Zealand
2013 Fast5 Netball World Series	1st place, gold medalist(s)	New Zealand

== Broadcaster and presenter ==
Since retiring as a netball player, Tairi has worked a broadcaster, presenter and commentator for Sky Sport (New Zealand). She has presented coverage of a variety of sports competitions including tennis, ANZ Premiership, NRL and NRLW. She has hosted The Kiwi League Show, alongside Monty Betham, and presented on Warriors TV. She also fronted Sky Sport's coverage of the 2018 Summer Youth Olympics. At the 2020 ASB Classic she interviewed Serena Williams and Caroline Wozniacki.

== Personal life ==
Tairi has had a relationship with Maurice Blair, a rugby league player.

== Honours ==
New South Wales Swifts

- ANZ Championship
  - Minor premiers: 2010

Waikato Bay of Plenty Magic

- ANZ Championship – New Zealand Conference
  - Winners: 2016

Australia

- World Youth Netball Championships
  - Winners: 2009

New Zealand

- Fast5 Netball World Series
  - Winners: 2013

Australian Institute of Sport

- Australian Netball League
  - Runners up: 2008, 2009

New South Wales

- Australian National Netball Championships
  - Winner: Under-21 (2009)
