= St Columba's Catholic College =

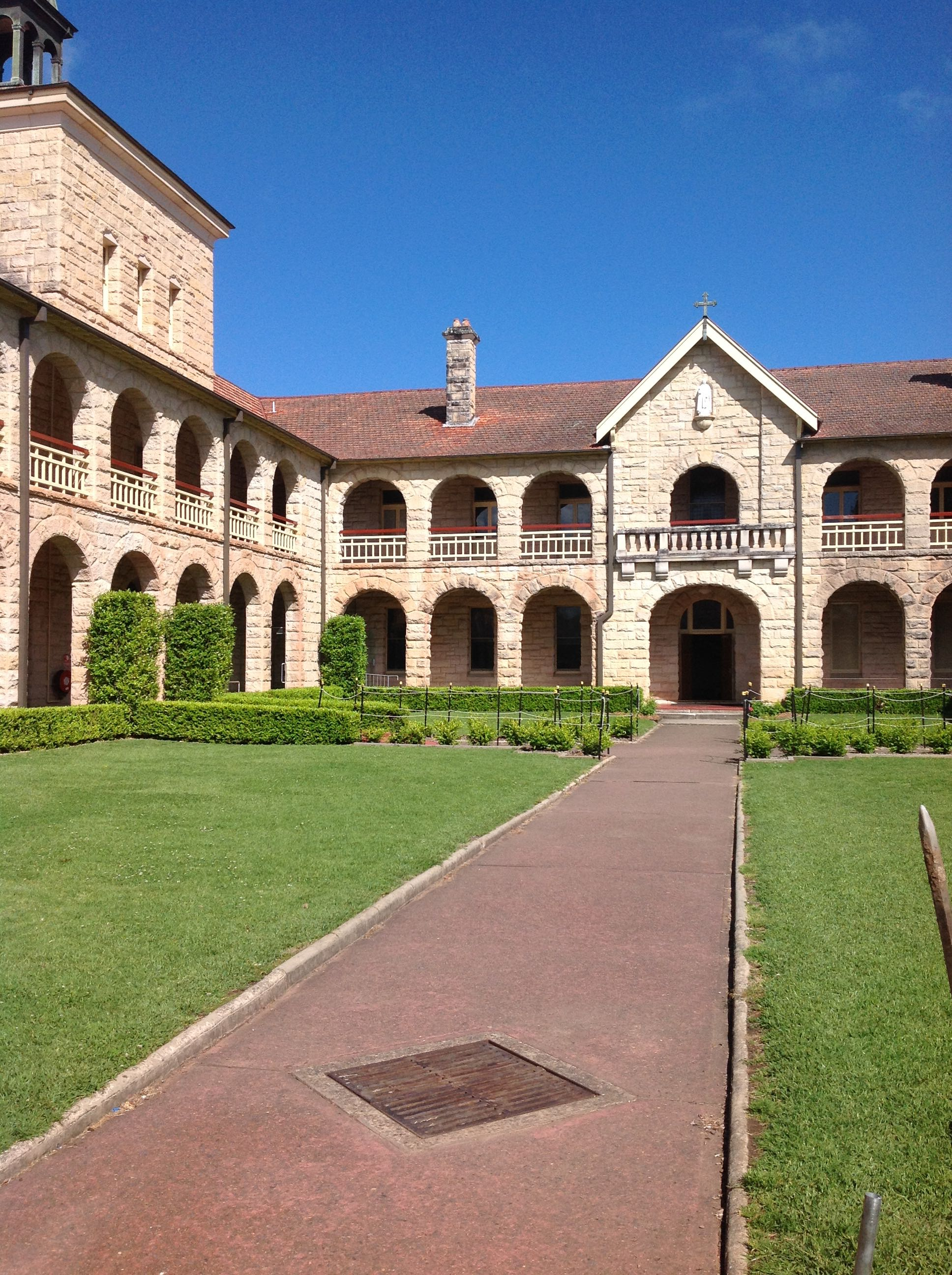
- Looking towards the main building (former Seminary) from the quadrangle.

Location
- Springwood, Blue Mountains, New South Wales; Australia; 33°40′24″S 150°35′19″E

Information
- Former name: St Columba's High School
- Type: Independent co-educational secondary day school
- Denomination: Roman Catholic
- Established: 1909–1977 (Seminary); 1979; 47 years ago (as Catholic High School)
- Principal: Phillip Scollard
- Slogan: "Act justly" (Short) Act Justly, Love Tenderly & Walk Humbly with Our God (Full)
- Website: www.stcolumbasspringwood.catholic.edu.au

St Columba's Catholic College, formerly St Columba's High School, is an independent Roman Catholic co-educational secondary day school, located in the Blue Mountains region, on the border of Winmalee and Springwood, in New South Wales, Australia.

Established in 1979, the school is set in the grounds of the St Columba's property, which has extensive bushland surrounding the school. The property is a listed site on the Blue Mountains City Council local government heritage register.

== Campus ==
Originally built as a Seminary in 1909, it was closed in 1977 and reopened as a high school in 1979. The monastic influence is seen in the neogothic sandstone architecture and the grounds with scattered grottos and shrines overlooking the Blue Mountains World Heritage National Park of Australia NSW.

The St Columba's property is one of the largest landholdings in the Blue Mountains Local Government Area. Much of the property consists of natural bushland and is habitat for some threatened and endangered species.

== Symbolism ==
- 'Columba' is a Latinisation of 'colum', which means dove. A dove is featured in the college crest.
- 'Iona Chapel' derives its name from the Island of Iona where Columba founded the monastery Iona Abbey.
- Much of the architecture features the Celtic Cross.
- The Feast Day of Columba on June 9 is celebrated annually by the college. Notable events include the teachers vs Year 12 basket/volleyball game.
- Students are organised into six houses: Henson (red), Chisholm (green), Gilroy (gold), MacKillop (purple), Lawrence (blue), Bradman (black and white).

== Telescope ==
A feature of note is a radio telescope dish salvaged from the Paul Wild Observatory at Culgoora, west of Narrabri in 1997. This is one of a heliograph array of 96 13.7-m dishes that circled the present location of the Compact Array. The heliograph array imaged the Sun at 80 and 160 MHz with several discoveries to its credit before decommission. The telescope, as of late 2023, has been dismantled and removed from the grounds.

== Principals ==
The following individuals have served as Principal:

Order	Officeholder	Term begin	Term end	Time in office	Notes
1	Anne Henson	1979	1985	5–6 years	Has a sporting house group named after her
2	Jim McCartan	1986	1992	5–6 years	
3	Geoff Hicks	1992	1998	5–6 years	
4	Alan Moran	1998	2001	2–3 years	Has a room named after him
5	Anne Wenham	2001	2005	3–4 years	
6	Delma Horan	2005	2013	7–8 years	
7	Paul Ryan	2014	2021	11–12 years	Served as principal during the 2013 Bushfires.
8	Phillip Scollard	2022	2025	4 years	

== Notable alumni ==
- Tom Eisenhuth, rugby league player
- Jenna Jones, Paralympian
- Emma Koster, netball player
- Claire Zorn, writer

== See also ==
- List of Catholic schools in New South Wales
- Catholic Education, Diocese of Parramatta
- Catholic education in Australia
