= Hunter Jaegers =

Defunct Australian netball team

- Founded: 2003
- Disbanded: 2007
- Based in: Newcastle, New South Wales
- Region: Hunter Region; New South Wales
- Home venue: Newcastle Entertainment Centre
- League: Commonwealth Bank Trophy
Uniform

Hunter Jaegers were an Australian netball team based in Newcastle, New South Wales. Together with Sydney Swifts and Sydney Sandpipers, they were one of three teams to represent Netball New South Wales in the Commonwealth Bank Trophy league. Hunter Jaegers made their CBT debut in 2004. They continued to play in the competition until its demise in 2007. In 2008, when the Commonwealth Bank Trophy was replaced by the ANZ Championship, Jaegers and Swifts merged to form New South Wales Swifts.

== Final placings ==
Season	Position
2004	6th
2005	5th
2006	7th
2007	6th

== Home venues ==
During the 2004 and 2005 seasons, Jaegers played their home games at the Newcastle Entertainment Centre.

== Notable former players ==
=== Internationals ===
Australia

- Jane Altschwager
- Karyn Bailey

New Zealand

- Courtney Tairi
- Daneka Wipiiti

=== New South Wales Swifts ===
- Emma Koster
- Tiffany Lincoln
- Jessica Mansell
- Kimberley Purcell

=== ANZ Championship ===
- Karyn Bailey
- Kirby Bentley
- Katie Walker

=== Captains ===
Captains	Years
Raegan Jackson	2004
Jane Altschwager	2005–2006
Jane Menzies	2007

== Head coaches ==
Coach	Years
Maria Lynch	2004–2005
Jon Fletcher	2006–2007

== Sponsorship ==
Sponsors	Seasons
McDonald's	1997–2007
