= Jessica Mansell =

Australian netball player

Personal information
- Born: 13 January 1989 (age 37) Sydney, Australia
- Height: 1.84 m (6 ft 1/2 in)

Netball career
- Playing positions: GD, GK
Years	Club team	Apps
2007	Hunter Jaegers	
2008	NNSW Waratahs	
2009	New South Wales Swifts	

Jessica Mansell (born 13 January 1989 in Sydney, Australia) is a former Australian netball player. She played for Hunter Jaegers in the 2007 Commonwealth Bank Trophy, for NNSW Waratahs in the 2008 Australian Netball League and for New South Wales Swifts in the 2009 ANZ Championship. Mansell also previously played for the and Sutherland Sharks.
