= Beth Shimmin =

Australian netball player

Personal information
- Born: Adelaide, South Australia
- Occupation: Student

Netball career
Years	Club team	Apps
2007	Adelaide Thunderbirds	
- Updated on 2009-03-29

Beth Shimmin (born in Adelaide, South Australia)is an Australian netball player. She played with the Adelaide Thunderbirds (2007) in the Commonwealth Bank Trophy, and as of 2009 was part of the Thunderbirds' extended training squad in the ANZ Championship.
