= Rebecca Bulley =

Australia netball international

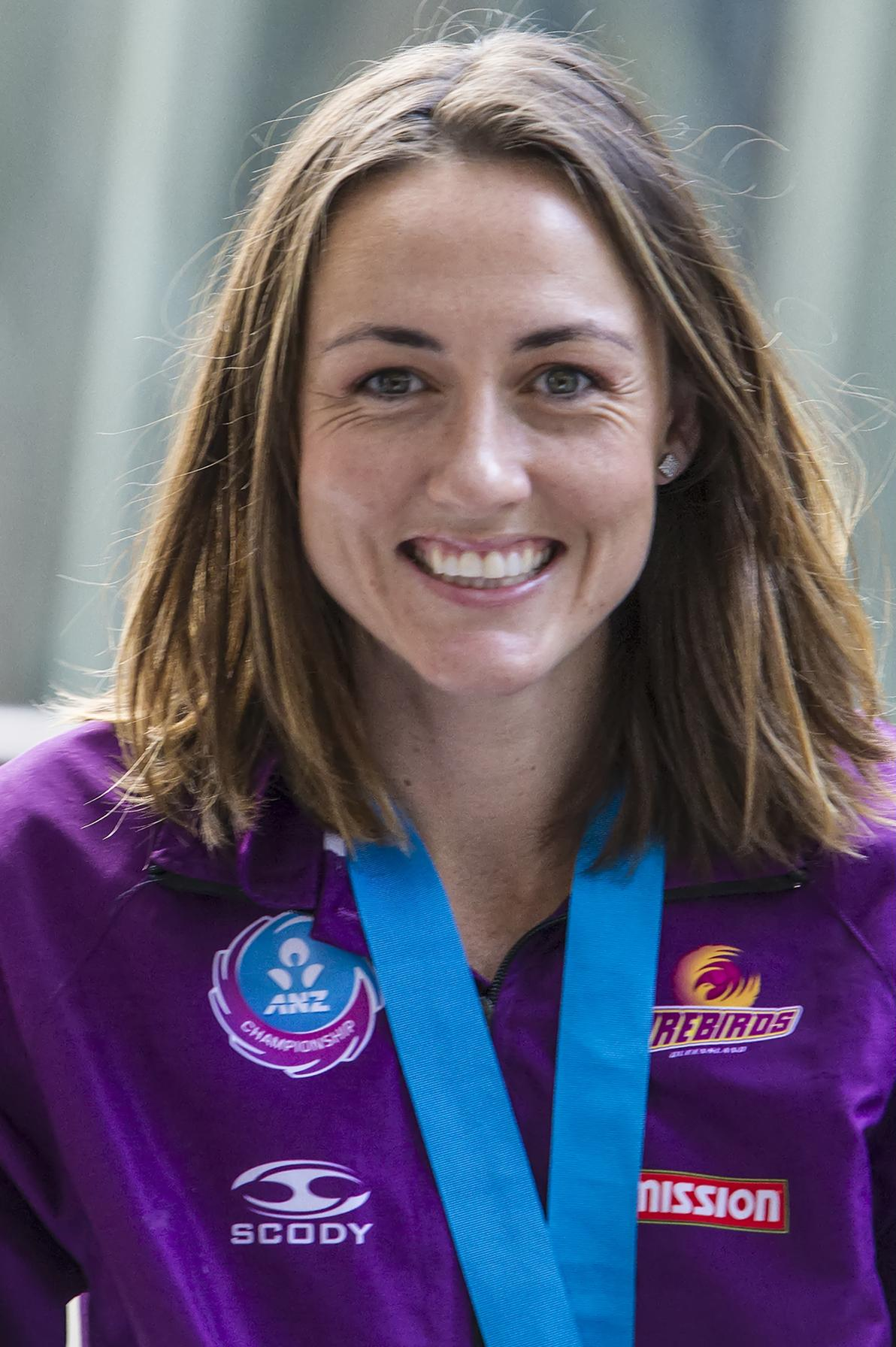
- Bulley in 2015

Personal information
- Full name: Rebecca Bulley (Née: Strachan)
- Born: 18 August 1982 (age 44) Pyramid Hill, Victoria, Australia
- Height: 186 cm (6 ft 1 in)
- Relative: Kieran Strachan (brother)
- School: Bendigo Senior Secondary College

Netball career
- Playing positions: GD, GK, WD
Years	Club team	Apps
199x–199x	Calivil United	
199x–1999	Sandhurst	
2000–2002	Melbourne Kestrels	
2001–2003	AIS	
2003	→ AIS Canberra Darters	
2004–2007	Melbourne Kestrels	
2007–2011	New South Wales Swifts	
2012–2014	Adelaide Thunderbirds	
2014–2015	Queensland Firebirds	
2017–2018	Giants Netball	
Years	National team	Caps
2008–2015	Australia	42
Coaching career
- Years: Team
- 2019–2020: Giants Netball Academy
- 2020: North Shore United
- 2022–: Queensland Firebirds
Medal record
Representing Australia
Netball World Cup
Gold medal – first place	2015 Sydney	Team
World Netball Series
Bronze medal – third place	2009 Manchester	Team
Commonwealth Games
Silver medal – second place	2010 Delhi	Team

Rebecca Bulley (born 18 August 1982), also known as Rebecca Strachan, is a former Australia netball international and current netball coach. Between 2008 and 2015 she made 42 senior appearances for Australia. Bulley was a member of the Australia teams that won the gold medal at the 2015 Netball World Cup and the silver medal at the 2010 Commonwealth Games. Bulley also won three ANZ Championship titles with three different teams – the 2008 New South Wales Swifts, the 2013 Adelaide Thunderbirds and the 2015 Queensland Firebirds. She began her senior club career with Melbourne Kestrels during the Commonwealth Bank Trophy era and finished it playing for Giants Netball in Suncorp Super Netball.

== Early life, family and education ==
Bulley is the daughter of Leon and Lynley Strachan. She was born in Victoria and raised in the Pyramid Hill and Bendigo districts. She attended Pyramid Hill College and Bendigo Senior Secondary College. Her sister, Meredith Ball (née Strachan), also played netball for Melbourne Kestrels, Melbourne University Lightning and Sandhurst. Her younger brother, Kieran Strachan is an Australian rules footballer. Rebecca is married to Randall Bulley, a schoolteacher who was based in Wollongong, but now teaches in Brisbane. She gave birth to a daughter, Indie in 2016. The Bulley family home is in Woonona, New South Wales.

== Playing career ==
=== Early years ===
As Rebecca Strachan, Bulley began her netball career as a junior with Calivil United in the Loddon Valley Football Netball League. Her mother, Lynley Strachan, coached at the Calivil United club. After her family moved to Bendigo, she switched to Sandhurst in the Bendigo Football Netball League. Her team mates at Sandhurst included her sister, Meredith.

=== Commonwealth Bank Trophy ===
Between 2000 and 2007, Bulley played 85 games for Melbourne Kestrels and AIS Canberra Darters in the Commonwealth Bank Trophy. She also captained both teams. Between 2001 and 2003 she also played for the Australian Institute of Sport.

=== ANZ Championship ===
New South Wales Swifts

Between 2008 and 2011, Bulley played for New South Wales Swifts in the ANZ Championship. After missing out on selection for the Melbourne Vixens squad, Bulley was encouraged by Liz Ellis to join Swifts. She was subsequently a member of the Swifts team that won the inaugural 2008 ANZ Championship title. At the end of the 2010 ANZ Championship season, Bulley was named the Holden Cruze ANZ Championship Player of the Year, the QBE NSW Swifts MVP and the NSW Swifts Members' Player of the Year.

Adelaide Thunderbirds

Between 2012 and 2014, Bulley played for Adelaide Thunderbirds. In 2013 she was a member of the Thunderbirds team won the ANZ Championship.

Queensland Firebirds

In 2015 Bulley played for Queensland Firebirds and finished the season with a third Championship winners medal.

=== Suncorp Super Netball ===
Giants Netball

Between 2017 and 2018, Bulley played for Giants Netball in the Suncorp Super Netball. Bulley had initially retired after the 2015 Netball World Cup in order to start a family. However, Giants head coach, Julie Fitzgerald, subsequently persuaded her to come out of retirement as an injury replacement for Kristiana Manu'a. In August 2018 Bulley announced her retirement as a player for the second time.

=== Australia ===
Between 2008 and 2015, Bulley made 42 senior appearances for Australia. From 2005 she was regularly featured in Australia squads, including the advance squad for the 2006 Commonwealth Games. However Bulley had to wait until 2008 before she made her Test debut. She made her senior debut on 20 September 2008 against New Zealand. She was subsequently a member of the Australia teams that won the silver medal at the 2010 Commonwealth Games and the gold medal at the 2015 Netball World Cup. She retired from international netball following the latter tournament.

Tournaments	Place
2009 World Netball Series	3rd place, bronze medalist(s)
2010 Commonwealth Games	2nd place, silver medalist(s)
2012 Netball Quad Series	1st place, gold medalist(s)
2015 Netball World Cup	1st place, gold medalist(s)

== Coaching career ==
=== Giants Netball Academy ===
During the 2019 Australian Netball League season, Bulley served as an assistant coach with Canberra Giants. She was subsequently appointed head coach of Giants, now playing as Giants Netball Academy ahead of the 2020 season.

=== North Shore United ===
In 2020, Bulley was head coach of North Shore United when they won the Netball NSW Premier League Opens title. United were crowned champions after a 56–44 grand final win over ERNA Hawks.

=== New South Wales Swifts ===
Ahead of the 2021 Suncorp Super Netball season, Bulley was named as assistant coach of New South Wales Swifts.

=== Queensland Firebirds ===
In July 2022, Queensland Firebirds announced that Bulley had been appointed as their head coach on a four-year deal. In June 2024, Bulley agreed to part ways with five rounds left in the regular season with the Firebirds, then last on the ladder, only having two wins from nine games.

=== Giants Netball Academy ===
In November 2024, the Giants Netball announced that Bulley would return to the club as Head Coach of the Giants Netball Academy. Her appointment recommenced in January 2025 after relocating with the family back to NSW inline with the 2025 netball pre-season.

== Honours ==
=== Playing career ===
Australia

- Netball World Cup
  - Winners: 2015
- Commonwealth Games
  - Runners Up: 2010
- Netball Quad Series
  - Winners: 2012

Queensland Firebirds

- ANZ Championship
  - Winners: 2015

Adelaide Thunderbirds

- ANZ Championship
  - Winners: 2013

New South Wales Swifts

- ANZ Championship
  - Winners: 2008

Individual

- Holden Cruze ANZ Championship Player of the Year
  - Winner: 2010
- QBE NSW Swifts MVP
  - Winner: 2010
- NSW Swifts Members' Player of the Year
  - Winner: 2010

=== Coaching career ===
North Shore United

- Netball NSW Premier League
  - Winners: 2020
