= Emma Koster =

Australian netball player

Personal information
- Born: 29 May 1984 (age 42)
- Height: 1.88 m (6 ft 2 in)
- School: St Columba's Catholic College
- University: University of Western Sydney

Netball career
- Playing positions: GD, GK
Years	Club team	Apps
2003–2004	NSWIS	
2004–2005	AIS Canberra Darters	
2006–2007	Hunter Jaegers	
2008–2009	New South Wales Swifts	
Medal record
Representing Australia
World Youth Netball Championships
Bronze medal – third place	2005 Fort Lauderdale	Team

Emma Koster (born 29 May 1984) is an Australian former netball player. Between 2003 and 2007, Koster played for Hunter Jaegers and AIS Canberra Darters in the Commonwealth Bank Trophy league. She later played for New South Wales Swifts in the ANZ Championship during the 2008 and 2009 seasons. She was a member of the Swifts team that won inaugural 2008 ANZ Championship. She also represented Australia at under-21 level.

== Early life, education and employment ==
Koster is originally from the Blue Mountains region of New South Wales. Between 1997 and 2002 she attended St Columba's Catholic College. Between 2009 and 2012 she attended the University of Western Sydney. Since 2020, Koster has worked for the Western Sydney Local Health District.

== Playing career ==
=== NSWIS ===
Between 2003 and 2004, Koster played for the New South Wales Institute of Sport. She was named the NSWIS Netball Player of the Year Award, shared the NSWIS Netball Players' Player Award and was awarded the Marj Groves Medal, presented to an NSWIS athlete by Netball New South Wales.

=== Commonwealth Bank Trophy ===
Between 2003 and 2007, Koster made 50 appearances for Hunter Jaegers and AIS Canberra Darters in the Commonwealth Bank Trophy league. In 2007 she played in every quarter for Hunter Jaegers and was a member of the team's leadership group. She was subsequently named the Netball NSW Marilyn Melhuish Commonwealth Bank Trophy Player of the Year.

=== New South Wales Swifts ===
Koster played for New South Wales Swifts in the ANZ Championship during the 2008 and 2009 seasons. She was a member of Swifts' inaugural ANZ Championship squad, helping them win the 2008 ANZ Championship. She made her ANZ Championship debut in the 2008 Round 4 match against Central Pulse. She was subsequently named the 2008 NSW Swifts Players' Player of the Year.

=== Australia ===
In 2005 Koster represented Australia at under-21 level. She was a member of the Australia team that won a bronze medal at the 2005 World Youth Netball Championships.

== Honours ==
New South Wales Swifts

- ANZ Championship
  - Winners: 2008

Individual Awards

Year	Award
2003–04	NSWIS Netball Player of the Year Award
2003–04	NSWIS Netball Players' Player Award ^{(Note 1)}
2003–04	Marj Groves Medal
2007	Netball NSW Marilyn Melhuish Commonwealth Bank Trophy Player of the Year
2008	NSW Swifts Players' Player of the Year

Notes

- ^1 Shared the award with Laura Brealey.
