= Catherine Cox (netball) =

Australia netball international

Catherine Cox AM
Personal information
- Full name: Catherine Anne Cox
- Born: 24 May 1976 (age 50) Whangārei, New Zealand
- Height: 1.88 m (6 ft 2 in)
- School: Mount St Benedict College; Oakhill College

Netball career
- Playing positions: GS, GA
Years	Club team	Apps
1995	Australian Institute of Sport	
1996	Sydney Cenovis	
1997–1999	Sydney Swifts	135
2000–2001	Perth Orioles	25
2002–2007	Sydney Swifts	
2008–2011	New South Wales Swifts	57
2012–2013	West Coast Fever	26
2014	Melbourne Vixens	9
Years	National team	Caps
1997–2013	Australia	108
Medal record
Representing Australia
World Netball Championships
Gold medal – first place	2007 Auckland	Team
Gold medal – first place	2011 Singapore	Team
Silver medal – second place	2003 Kingston	Team
Commonwealth Games
Gold medal – first place	2002 Manchester	Team
Silver medal – second place	2006 Melbourne	Team
Silver medal – second place	2010 Delhi	Team
World Netball Series
Bronze medal – third place	2009 Manchester	Team
World Youth Netball Championships
Gold medal – first place	1996 Toronto	Team

Catherine Anne Cox AM (born 24 May 1976) is a former Australian netball international and current netball commentator. Between 1997 and 2013, she made 108 senior appearances for Australia. She was a prominent member of the Australia teams that won gold medals at the 2002 Commonwealth Games and the 2007 and 2011 World Netball Championships. She was also a member of the Australia teams that won silver medals at the 2003 World Netball Championships and the 2006 and 2010 Commonwealth Games. Cox captained Australia on seven occasions, including when they won the 2011 Constellation Cup.

During the Commonwealth Bank Trophy era, Cox played for Sydney Swifts. She was a member of Swifts teams that won premierships in 2004, 2006 and 2007. Between 2008 and 2011, she captained New South Wales Swifts, including when they won the inaugural 2008 ANZ Championship. During her playing career, she also captained Perth Orioles and West Coast Fever. In her final season as a player, Cox won a fifth premiership with the 2014 Melbourne Vixens.

== Early life, family and education ==
Cox was born in Whangārei in New Zealand's Northland Region. She is the daughter of Frances and Neville Cox. Both of her parents are originally from New Zealand. They met in Hamilton, before moving to Northland where they lived for seven years. Frances was a teacher at a school in Whau Valley and Neville was a manager at the Arthur Yates seed company. Cox was born in Whangarei Hospital on 24 May 1976. When she was three months old, her family moved from their Mount Parihaka home to South Island. The family then moved to Australia when she was six. Cox was raised in Sydney. She attended Mount St Benedict College and Oakhill College. She graduated from the latter in 1994. Cox started playing netball at age 11, with the Hills District Netball Association. Cox is the mother of a daughter, Harper (born February 2016).

== Playing career ==
=== New South Wales ===
Between 1992 and 2004, Cox represented New South Wales in the Australian National Netball Championships at under-17, under-19 and open levels.

=== Mobil Superleague ===
During the Mobil Superleague era, Cox played for the Australian Institute of Sport in 1995 and for Sydney Cenovis in 1996. Sydney Cenovis also featured a young Liz Ellis and were coached by Julie Fitzgerald.

=== Commonwealth Bank Trophy ===
==== Sydney Swifts ====
Between 1997 and 1999 and again between 2002 and 2007, Cox made 135 appearances for Sydney Swifts in the Commonwealth Bank Trophy league. She was a member of Swifts teams that won premierships in 2004, 2006 and 2007. Between 2004 and 2006, she also helped Swifts win three minor premierships. Between 2004 and 2007, she played in five successive grand finals for Swifts. Her team mates at Sydney Swifts included Liz Ellis, Megan Anderson and Susan Pratley. She formed a notable partnership with Pratley that also saw them play together for New South Wales Swifts and Australia. Between 2003 and 2007 she was named in five successive Margaret Pewtress Teams of the Year.

==== Perth Orioles ====
Between 2000 and 2001, Cox made 25 appearances for Perth Orioles in the Commonwealth Bank Trophy league. She co-captained Orioles during both seasons. She was also named Orioles' Player of the Year for both seasons.

=== ANZ Championship era ===
==== New South Wales Swifts ====
Between 2008 and 2011, Cox made 57 appearances for New South Wales Swifts in the ANZ Championship. She also captained Swifts during these four seasons, including when they won the inaugural 2008 ANZ Championship and the 2010 minor premiership. In 2008 she played in her sixth successive grand final and was named MVP. In 2010 Cox made her 200th combined Commonwealth Bank Trophy/ANZ Championship game in Round 13 against Melbourne Vixens.

Cox's playing career with Swifts ended in controversial circumstances. Following an "internal review", Julie Fitzgerald was replaced as Swifts head coach by Lisa Beehag. The review was conducted during the 2011 season. Cox publicly criticized Netball New South Wales for distracting players with the review and even alleged that it was responsible for Swifts losing the 2011 minor semi-final. Beehag subsequently informed Cox that she would not be needed as either as captain or player the following season and Cox then departed for West Coast Fever.

==== West Coast Fever ====
In August 2011, Cox joined West Coast Fever. During the 2012 and 2013 seasons, Cox captained Fever and made 26 appearances.

==== Melbourne Vixens ====
In February 2014, Cox joined Melbourne Vixens. In April 2014, Cox announced she would be retiring as a netball player at the end of the 2014 season. In May, Cox played her 250th combined Commonwealth Bank Trophy/ANZ Championship game in Round 10 against New South Wales Swifts. She subsequently went on to help the 2014 Melbourne Vixens win both the minor premiership and the overall championship before retiring.

=== Grand finals ===
	Grand finals	Team	Place	Opponent	Goals
1	2003	Sydney Swifts	Runners up	Melbourne Phoenix	23/36 (64%)
2	2004	Sydney Swifts	Winners	Melbourne Phoenix	36/41 (88%)
3	2005	Sydney Swifts	Runners up	Melbourne Phoenix	29/38 (76%)
4	2006	Sydney Swifts	Winners	Adelaide Thunderbirds	39/43 (91%)
5	2007	Sydney Swifts	Winners	Melbourne Phoenix	22/26 (85%)
6	2008	New South Wales Swifts	Winners	Waikato Bay of Plenty Magic	41/46 (89%)
7	2014	Melbourne Vixens	Winners	Queensland Firebirds	6/7 (86%)

=== Australia ===
Between 1997 and 2013, Cox made 108 senior appearances for Australia. Between 1994 and 1996 she had represented Australia at under-21 level. She was a standout player in the 1996 World Youth Netball Championships grand final in which Australia beat New Zealand. She made her senior debut on 11 June 1997, aged 21, in a 65–38 win against South Africa at Challenge Stadium in Perth.

Cox was overlooked for the 1998 Commonwealth Games and the 1999 World Netball Championships. After being left out of the 1998 Commonwealth Games squad, Cox considered switching to play for New Zealand after she was approached by Netball New Zealand. However she subsequently re-established herself in the Australia team and was a prominent member of the Australia teams that won gold medals at the 2002 Commonwealth Games and the 2007 and 2011 World Netball Championships. Cox was vice-captain of the 2011 Australia team. She was also a member of the Australia teams that won silver medals at the 2003 World Netball Championships and the 2006 and 2010 Commonwealth Games. In both 2004 and 2005, Cox was named Australian International Player of the Year.

Cox captained Australia on seven occasions. She first captained Australia in November 2004 when they lost 50–42 to New Zealand. She next captained Australia in October 2011 against England, after regular captain, Natalie von Bertouch, was injured. During the same match, Cox also scored her 2000th goal for Australia. She subsequently captained Australia when they won the 2011 Constellation Cup.

On 20 September 2012, during a 2012 Constellation Cup match against New Zealand, Cox made her 100th Test appearance for Australia. As a result she became only the fourth Australia netball international, after Vicki Wilson, Sharelle McMahon and Liz Ellis, to reach the century mark.

Tournaments	Place
1996 World Youth Netball Championships	1st place, gold medalist(s)
2002 Commonwealth Games	1st place, gold medalist(s)
2003 World Netball Championships	2nd place, silver medalist(s)
2006 Commonwealth Games	2nd place, silver medalist(s)
2007 World Netball Championships	1st place, gold medalist(s)
2009 World Netball Series	3rd place, bronze medalist(s)
2010 Commonwealth Games	2nd place, silver medalist(s)
2011 World Netball Championships	1st place, gold medalist(s)
2012 Netball Quad Series	1st place, gold medalist(s)

== Commentator ==
Since 2015 Cox has worked as a netball commentator. She made her broadcast debut, when together with Sharelle McMahon, Liz Ellis and Kelli Underwood, she was part of the Fox Sports (Australia) commentary team that covered the 2015 ANZ Championship season. In 2015 Cox, Ellis and McMahon toured as part of a stage show named The Centurions, celebrating the careers and back stories of three Australia netball internationals who had played more than 100 international matches. Since 2017, Cox has worked for Nine, providing commentary for their Suncorp Super Netball, Netball World Cup and Constellation Cup coverage.

== Honours ==
Australia

- World Netball Championships
  - Winners: 2007, 2011
  - Runners Up: 2003
- Commonwealth Games
  - Winners: 2002
  - Runners Up: 2006, 2010
- Netball Quad Series
  - Winners: 2012

Sydney Swifts

- Commonwealth Bank Trophy
  - Winners: 2004, 2006, 2007
  - Runners up: 1998, 2003, 2005
  - Minor premierships: 2004, 2005, 2006

New South Wales Swifts

- ANZ Championship
  - Winners: 2008
  - Minor Premiership: 2010

Melbourne Vixens

- ANZ Championship
  - Winners: 2014
  - Minor Premierships: 2014

Individual Awards

Year	Award
2000	Perth Orioles' Player of the Year
2001	Perth Orioles' Player of the Year
2003	Margaret Pewtress Team of the Year
2004	Australian International Player of the Year
2004	Margaret Pewtress Team of the Year
2004	Commonwealth Bank Trophy Grand Final MVP
2005	Margaret Pewtress Team of the Year
2005	Australian International Player of the Year
2006	Margaret Pewtress Team of the Year
2007	Margaret Pewtress Team of the Year
2008	ANZ Championship Grand Final MVP
2008	Australian ANZ Championship Player of the Year
2008	QBE NSW Swifts MVP
2008	NSW Swifts Members' Player of the Year
2009	QBE NSW Swifts MVP
2011	QBE NSW Swifts MVP
2011	New Idea's Favourite Diamond
2012	New Idea's Favourite Diamond
2022	Member of the Order of Australia
2022	Sport Australia Hall of Fame inductee
