= Adelaide Johnson (netball) =

Australian netball player

Personal information
- Born: Sydney
- Height: 1.86 m (6 ft 1 in)

Netball career
- Playing positions: GK, GD
Years	Club team	Apps
2008	New South Wales Swifts	
2005–07	Sydney Swifts	
- Updated on 2009-03-20

Adelaide Johnson is an Australian netball player. Johnson played with the Sydney Swifts in the Commonwealth Bank Trophy from 2005–07, winning two premierships in the last two years of the competition. With the start of the ANZ Championship in 2008, Johnson was selected to play for the New South Wales Swifts in the inaugural season, where she was the first Goal Keeper to stop Waikato Bay of Plenty Magic's dominance. During the same season, Johnson also managed to save the Swifts from losing against the Queensland Firebirds in the dying seconds of the game, when a contact call went in Johnson's favour and her opponent, Jamaican Goal Shooter Romelda Akien was penalised.

Despite offers from both the Swifts and the Mystics Johnson did not sign to play in the 2009 ANZ Championship season.
