= Tiffany Lincoln =

Australian netball player

Personal information
- Born: 7 April 1985 (age 41)
- Occupation: Owner of Netty Heads Australia. Performance Netball Coach.
- Height: 1.74 m (5 ft 9 in)
- Spouse: Nathan Gilmour

Netball career
- Playing positions: GA, WA
Years	Club team	Apps
2008	New South Wales Swifts	
- Updated on 2009-03-21

Tiffany Lincoln (born 7 April 1985) is an Australian netball player. In 2008, Lincoln played for the New South Wales Swifts in the ANZ Championship. She was not signed to play in the 2009 season.
