= Susan Pettitt =

Australian international netball player (born 1984)

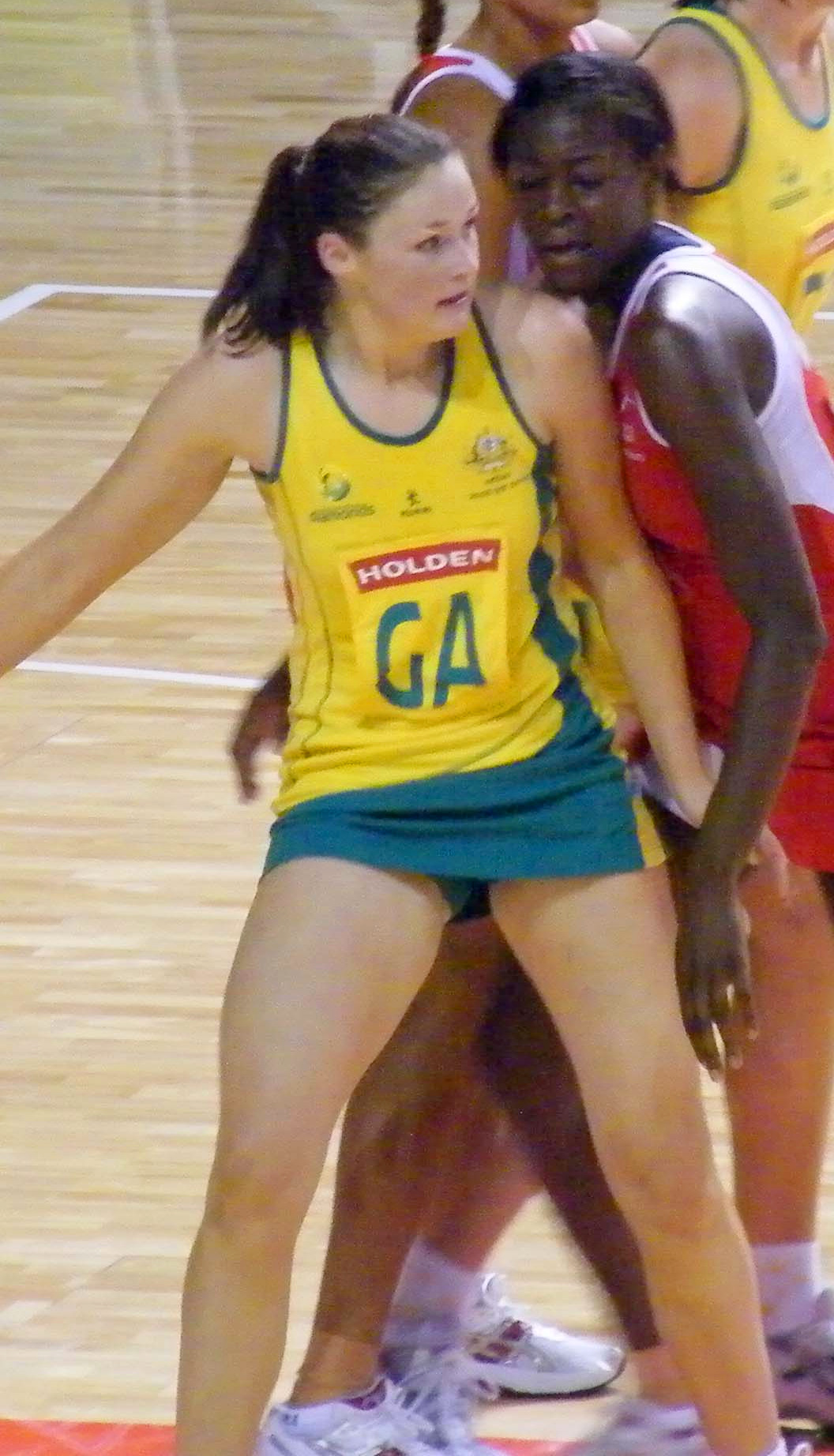
- Pettitt (left) in 2008

Personal information
- Full name: Susan Leanne Pettitt (Née: Pratley)
- Born: 23 March 1984 (age 42) Canberra, Australia
- Height: 1.80 m (5 ft 11 in)
- Spouse: Brad Pettitt (m. 2014)
- School: Bega High School
- University: University of Sydney

Netball career
- Playing positions: GA, GS
Years	Club team	Apps
2002	Sydney Sandpipers	68
2003–05	AIS Canberra Darters	97
2006–07	Sydney Swifts	
2008–16	New South Wales Swifts	
2017–18	Giants Netball	
Years	National team	Caps
2002–05	Australia U21	
2006–18	Australian Netball Diamonds	71
Medal record
Representing Australia
Netball World Championships
Gold medal – first place	2007 Auckland	Netball
Commonwealth Games
Silver medal – second place	2006 Melbourne	Netball
Silver medal – second place	2010 Delhi	Netball
Silver medal – second place	2018 Gold Coast	Netball
World Netball Series
Bronze medal – third place	2009 Manchester	Fastnet
Bronze medal – third place	2011 Liverpool	Fastnet
Silver medal – second place	2013 Auckland	Fast5 Netball World Series
- Updated on 7 November 2014

Susan Leanne Pettitt (née Pratley on 23 March 1984) is a former Australian international netball player, who played goal attack or goal shooter. She was a member of the Australian national team from 2006–2018, replacing the likes of Eloise Southby-Halbish, Megan Dehn, and Cynna Kydd. Prior to this she was quite an experienced campaigner as captain of the Australian 21 and under team, and the national league team AIS Canberra Darters.

She made her debut in 2002 with Sydney Sandpipers.

From 2003 to 2005 Pettitt was the cornerstone of Australia's development squads, with her notable leadership, composure, and shooting accuracy and reliable volume. Then in 2006 she joined the Sydney Swifts national league team to suddenly become a partner to shooting dynamo Catherine Cox, and with both Cox and Sharelle McMahon in the Australian team.

She has captained the Australian 21U Team and was Vice-Captain of the Australian 21U Team which competed in the World Youth Cup in Fort Lauderdale where they finished third. Pettitt captained the AIS Canberra Darters in 2004 and 2005 and finished her netball scholarship at the AIS at the end of 2005. She moved to Sydney in early 2006 and made her debut for Australia at the Melbourne 2006 Commonwealth Games at which she was a recipient of a silver medal. Four months later Susan was named player of the match after an outstanding performance against the Silver Ferns in Australia.

She was the vice-captain of the New South Wales Swifts in the ANZ Championship, though since 2017 has been a member of the Giants Netball team in the new Suncorp Super Netball league. She announced her retirement from domestic and international netball at the end of the 2018 season.

Due to her success, she had a grandstand in named after her in her hometown. “The Susan Pratley Stand” in Bega, in honour of the town's first netball world champion.

== Early career ==
Despite being born in Canberra, she was raised in the small country town of Quaama, 20 km from Bega on the far south coast of New South Wales.

Pettitt was identified in her early teens by selectors and rose through the junior representative ranks with speed and poise including AIS and NSWIS scholarships.

== Commonwealth Bank Trophy ==
Pettitt took the court for the Sydney Swifts during their premiership-winning Commonwealth Bank Trophy season, forming a partnership with fellow Australian representative Catherine Cox. Pettitt put her name in the history books after executing a perfect shooting performance during the Commonwealth Bank Trophy Grand Final match and shot 26 goals without a miss. She was also a member of the Swifts' premiership-winning team in 2007.

== ANZ Championship ==
Pettitt currently plays for the New South Wales Swifts in the ANZ Championship. In 2015, Pettitt is entering her 8th season with the club. She is the most capped player for the New South Wales Swifts with 97 ANZ Championship caps and the only player to have taken part in all 97 New South Wales Swifts matches since the first ANZ Championship match against the Southern Steel in 2008 at which she made 28 goals out of 31 attempts.

Pettitt was a member of the inaugural ANZ Championship winners the New South Wales Swifts. In the Grand Final at Acer Arena on 28 July 2008 the New South Wales Swifts defeated the Waikato Bay of Plenty Magic 65 – 56. Pettitt played GA, shooting 24 goals out of 30 attempts at 80%.

She is one of the five Australian netball players who is an ANZ ambassador. Pettitt has been the vice-captain of the New South Wales Swifts since 2012.

On 10 April 2010, Pettitt played her 100th senior game against the Central Pulse scoring 27/31. Pettitt played her 75th ANZ Championship game against the West Coast Fever in Round 5 of the 2013 season at which she scored 32 goals out of 38 attempts, and notched her 150th combined elite netball games in Round 13 of the same season against the Queensland Firebirds at the Brisbane Convention & Exhibition Centre.

== Australian Diamonds ==
In 2007, Pettitt played in the 2007 World Netball Championships and played in either Goal Attack or Goal Shooter. In the grand final against the New Zealand national netball team, Pettitt was called to play in the second half replacing Sharelle McMahon, a surprise move by Norma Plummer to help improve on the team's accuracy. This went very well until Pettitt got a concussion which she was benched during the fourth quarter. Her contribution was enough for Australia to win the 2007 World Netball Championships. Pettitt was selected into the Diamonds squad in 2010 heading into the Commonwealth Games in India. She did not play in the Grand Final against the New Zealand national netball team. However, she did get court time against Samoa and shot 25/27 (93%), India and shot 39/42 (93%), Malawi and shot 36/39 (92%) and Trinidad and Tobago and shot 17/21 (81%). Pettitt did not get selected into the 2011 World Netball Championships Squad, a huge blow for her with the likes of Erin Bell with her versatility in GS, GA and WA making it in front of Susan Pettitt. In November 2011, Pettitt entered the Australian Fastnet Diamonds going into the 3rd Fastnet Series in Liverpool, England and was announced co-captain alongside Bianca Chatfield.

In 2012, Pettitt regained her place in the Australian Diamonds team for the 2012 Constellation Cup against the Silver Ferns and the Quad Series against the Silver Ferns, England and the South Africa SPAR Proteas in all of which she played along with Catherine Cox. Pettitt was also selected in the Australian Diamonds team to tour England in January 2013. Later in 2013, Pettitt was completely dropped from the Australian Diamonds not even being selected in the extended squad. After improving her fitness throughout 2014, Pettitt was again selected in the Australian Diamonds squad, but failed to make the final team.

In 2017, after being gone for three years, Susan Pettitt had returned to the Australian Diamonds and had a 57–50 victory over Silver Ferns and redeemed her MVP title. During the same game, Susan Pettitt was instrumental during her time on court for the first half, finishing with 10 goals out of 14 attempts, along with eight feeds before making way for Stephanie Wood at half-time. The same year she also participated in the Constellation Cup and was auditioned for a gold medal shot at the 2018 Commonwealth Games. In the middle of 2017 she had switched to Giants Netball, and participated in a game against Melbourne Vixens.

In 2018, after playing for over 12 years, Pettitt had announced retirement.

== Personal life ==
Susan Pettitt have two brothers (Graeme and Mark) and sister (Joanne) who also are sportspeople.

Pettitt is a resident of the Albion Park. where she lives on a farm with her husband Brad and animals. Together with Brad, she likes to drive a coffee truck and watch Cronulla-Sutherland Sharks.

On 1 December 2013, Pettitt announced her engagement to Brad Pettitt. They were married on 7 November 2014 at Terrara House near Nowra on the South Coast of New South Wales.

Prior to the wedding, Pettitt was featured twice in the Swifts Insider issue, a magazine by the New South Wales Swifts and in 2015 was featured again in the same magazine.

== ANZ Championship accolades ==
- 2009 NSW Swifts Members' Player of the Year
- 2012 ANZ Championship Most Valuable Player nominee
- 2012 QBE NSW Swifts Most Valued Player
- 2014 FOXTEL ANZ Championship All-Star Team (GA)

== National representation ==
- 2006–2010, 2012Australian Diamonds
- 2009 Australian FastNet team
- 2013 Australian Fast5 Flyers
- 2014 Australian Diamonds Squad

== Netball career facts ==
- 2006 Commonwealth Games Silver Medal
- 2007 World Netball Championships gold medal
- 2008 ANZ Championship premiers
- 2009 New Idea Australia's Favourite Diamond
- 2010 Commonwealth Games Silver Medal (double extra-time)
- 2012–2013 NSW Swifts vice-captain
- 2013 Australian Fast5 Flyers – Silver Medalists
- 2014 NSW Swifts Leadership Group
