= Kimberley Smith (netball) =

Australian netball player

Kimberley Green
Personal information
- Full name: Kimberley Smith (Née: Purcell)
- Born: 18 June 1982 (age 44)
- Occupation: Solicitor
- Height: 1.82 m (6 ft 0 in)
- School: Caringbah High School
- University: University of Technology, Sydney

Netball career
- Playing positions: GD, GK, WD
Years	Club team	Apps
2000–2003	Sydney Sandpipers	
2004–2006	Hunter Jaegers	
2007	Sydney Swifts	
2008–2011	New South Wales Swifts	
- Updated on 2018-07-31

Kimberley Smith (née Purcell; born 18 June 1982) is an Australian netball player in the ANZ Championship, playing for the New South Wales Swifts. She played for the Hunter Jaegers in years up to and including 2006. In 2007, she played for the Sydney Swifts and was key to ANZ Grand Final victory in that year against the Melbourne Phoenix, playing as wing defence. In 2008, she became one of 18 members in the Australian netball squad, although she was not included in the final team. Smith was selected to be in the initial squad in 2010, but was again unsuccessful in joining the final team. Smith is known for her athleticism, as she's able to play a strong one-on-one style of play.

Smith announced her retirement from top level netball on 2 September 2011.
