= Julie Fitzgerald =

Australian netball coach

Julia Fitzgerald AM
Personal information
- Full name: Julie Fitzgerald

Netball career
Coaching career
- Years: Team
- 1994–1996: Sydney Ku-ring-gai/Cenovis
- 1997–2007: Sydney Swifts
- 2008–2011: New South Wales Swifts
- 2009: → World 7
- 2011–2013: Australian Institute of Sport
- 2013–2016: Waikato Bay of Plenty Magic
- 2016–2025: Giants Netball

Julie Fitzgerald AM is a veteran Australian netball coach. Between 1997 and 2007, Fitzgerald served as head coach of Sydney Swifts in the Commonwealth Bank Trophy league. She guided Swifts to premierships in 2001, 2004, 2006 and 2007. Between 2008 and 2011, she served as head coach of New South Wales Swifts in the ANZ Championship. In 2008, she guided Swifts to the inaugural ANZ Championship title. Between 2014 and 2016, she guided Waikato Bay of Plenty Magic to the Finals Series every year in the ANZ Championship. Since 2017, Fitzgerald has served as head coach of Giants Netball in Suncorp Super Netball, guiding them to two grand finals and two minor championships. In 2020, Fitzgerald was made a Member of the Order of Australia.

== Early life and family ==
Fitzgerald is originally from Sydney, growing up in Hornsby Shire. She started playing netball in Hornsby Heights when she was about eight years old. She is a single parent to four children – Katie, Kristie, Vicky and John – and is a resident of Wahroonga.

== Head coach ==
=== New South Wales ===
Between 1985 and 1999, Fitzgerald served as head coach of various New South Wales teams that played in the Australian National Netball Championships at under-19, under-21 and open levels.

=== Sydney Ku-ring-gai/Cenovis ===
At state league level, Fitzgerald served as head coach of a team that represented the Ku-ring-gai area. She had previously coached several junior representative teams for the Ku-ring-gai Netball Association. Between 1994 and 1996, Fitzgerald served as head coach of the Sydney Ku-ring-gai/Cenovis team in the Mobil Superleague. The team featured a young Liz Ellis and Catherine Cox. In 1994 and 1996 they were Mobil Superleague semi-finalists.

=== Sydney Swifts ===
Between 1997 and 2007, Fitzgerald served as head coach of Sydney Swifts in the Commonwealth Bank Trophy league. With teams featuring Liz Ellis, Catherine Cox and Megan Anderson, she guided Swifts to premierships in 2001, 2004, 2006 and 2007. In 2004, 2006 and 2007 she was named Netball Australia Coach of the Year.

=== New South Wales Swifts ===
Between 2008 and 2011, Fitzgerald served as head coach of New South Wales Swifts in the ANZ Championship. In 2008 she guided Swifts to the premiership and was named Australian ANZ Championship Coach of the Year. On 18 May 2009, she took charge of her 200th combined Sydney Swifts/NSW Swifts match when Swifts played Queensland Firebirds in Round 7. In 2010 she guided Swifts to the minor premiership. 2011 was the last season that Fitzgerald served as Swifts' head coach. Following a controversial "internal review" conducted during the 2011 season by Netball New South Wales, she was replaced by Lisa Beehag.

=== World 7 ===
Fitzgerald served as head coach of a World 7 team that defeated New Zealand 2–1 in the 2009 Taini Jamison Trophy Series. Lisa Alexander served as Fitzgerald's assistant during the series.

=== Australian Institute of Sport ===
Between 2011 and 2013, Fitzgerald served as head netball coach at the Australian Institute of Sport. In 2012 she guided an AIS team to fourth in the Australian Netball League.

=== Waikato Bay of Plenty Magic ===
In July 2013, Fitzgerald was appointed head coach of Waikato Bay of Plenty Magic. Between 2014 and 2016, she guided Magic to the Finals Series every year in the ANZ Championship. While Magic head coach, she was also named head coach of the 2014 ANZ Championship All Star Team. In both 2015 and 2016, Fitzgerald guided Magic to the New Zealand Conference titles. On 27 June 2016, at a 2016 Round 13 match against Queensland Firebirds, Fitzgerald coached her 100th ANZ Championship match.

=== Giants Netball ===
In August 2016, Fitzgerald was announced as head coach of Netball New South Wales's new franchise. Since 2017, Fitzgerald has served as head coach of Giants Netball in Suncorp Super Netball. In 2017 she guided them to the grand final. In 2018 she guided Giants to the minor premiership. During the 2018 season Fitzgerald also coached her 300th senior league match. In 2020, Fitzgerald was made a Member of the Order of Australia. In 2021, Fitzgerald guided Giants to both a second minor premiership and a second grand final. During the season she coached her 350th senior league match. The grand final was her 360th in charge.

== Assistant coach ==
=== Australia ===
Fitzgerald has worked with the Australia national netball team as both an assistant and development coach. In 2006 Fitzgerald served as an assistant to Lisa Alexander with the Australia under-21 team. Between 2011 and 2013 she served as Alexander's assistant at various series and tournaments including the 2011 World Netball Series and 2012 Fast5 Netball World Series. In 2019 Fitzgerald was appointed as head coach of Netball Australia's athlete development program. In 2021 she was re-appointed to the role.

=== NSWIS ===
In July 2017, alongside Rob Wright, Fitzgerald served as an assistant coach to Briony Akle as she coached the New South Wales Institute of Sport team that finished third in the 2017 Netball New Zealand Super Club tournament. The NSWIS team was a composite team featuring players from both New South Wales Swifts and Giants Netball.

== Basketball ==
As well as being a netball coach, Fitzgerald has also been a local basketball administrator. Between 1996 and 2007 she worked as a general manager for the Hornsby Ku-ring-gai Basketball Association. During the mid‑1990s she helped establish Hornsby Spiders Basketball Club.

== Honours ==
=== Coach ===
Giants Netball

- Suncorp Super Netball
  - Runners up: 2017, 2021
  - Minor Premiership: 2018, 2021

Waikato Bay of Plenty Magic

- ANZ Championship – New Zealand Conference
  - Winners: 2015, 2016

New South Wales Swifts

- ANZ Championship
  - Winners: 2008
  - Minor Premiership: 2010

World 7

- Taini Jamison Trophy
  - Winners: 2009

Sydney Swifts

- Commonwealth Bank Trophy
  - Winners: 2001, 2004, 2006, 2007
  - Runners up: 1998, 2003, 2005

=== Individual awards ===
Year	Award
2004	Netball Australia Coach of the Year Award
2006	Netball Australia Coach of the Year Award
2007	Netball Australia Coach of the Year Award
2008	Australian ANZ Championship Coach of the Year
2014	ANZ Championship All Star Coach
2015	New Zealand ANZ Championship Coach of the Year
2016	New Zealand ANZ Championship Coach of the Year
2019	Netball NSW Life Membership
2020	Member of the Order of Australia
