= Erin Bell =

Australian netball player

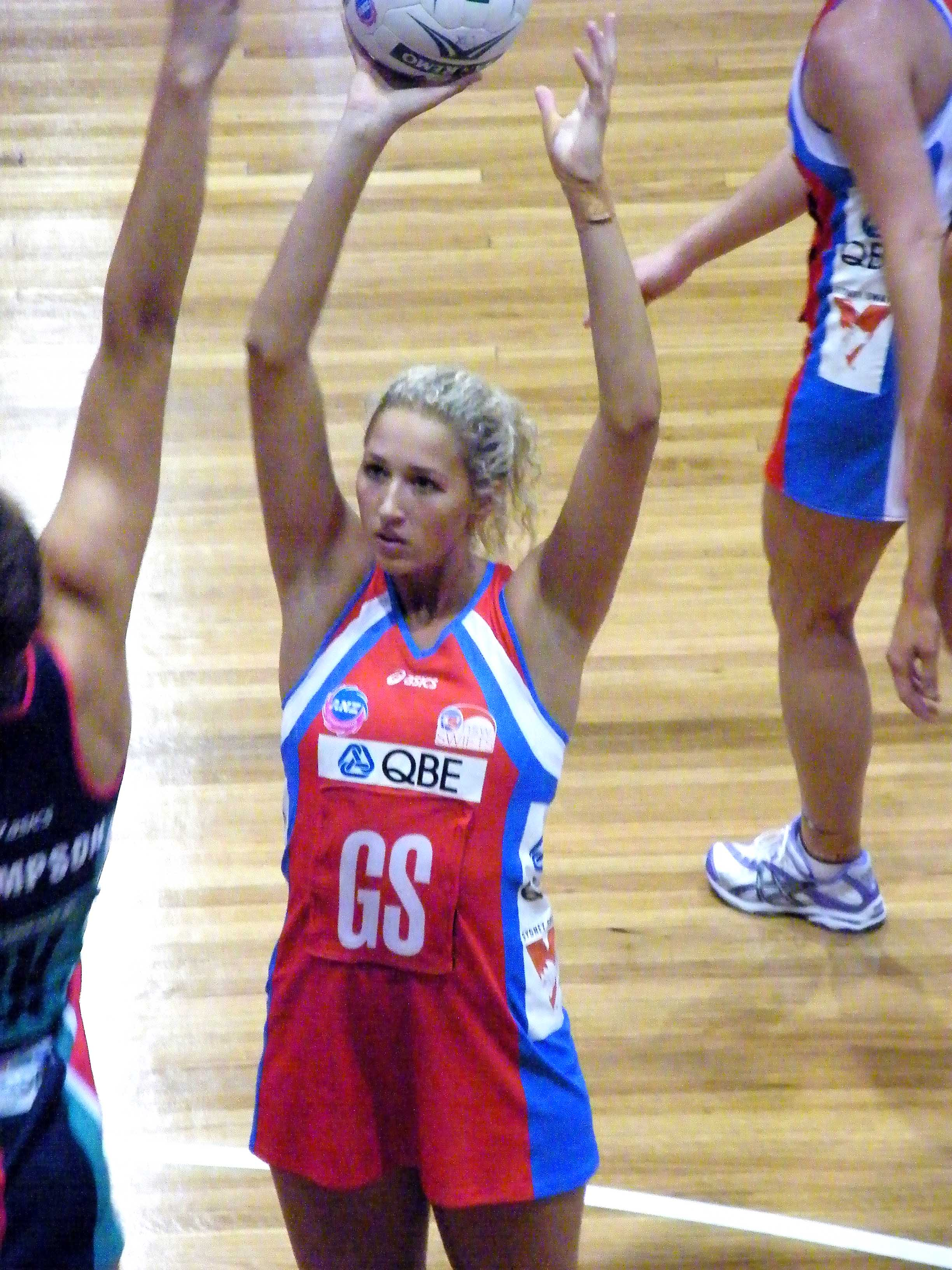

Personal information
- Born: 30 April 1987 (age 39)
- Height: 178 cm (5 ft 10 in)
- School: Menai High School

Netball career
- Playing positions: GA, GS, WA
Years	Club team	Apps
2005–2007	Sydney Swifts	
2008–2009	New South Wales Swifts	
2010–2017	Adelaide Thunderbirds	
2018	Collingwood Magpies	
Years	National team	Caps
2011-2016	Australia	30
Medal record
Representing Australia
Netball World Cup
Gold medal – first place	2011 Singapore	Team
Gold medal – first place	2015 Australia	Team
Fast5 Netball World Series
Silver medal – second place	2014 Auckland	Team
Silver medal – second place	2016 Melbourne	Team
- Updated on 2018-12-12

Erin Bell (born 30 April 1987) is a former Australian netball player.

Bell's career started in 2005 with the Sydney Swifts in the Commonwealth Bank Trophy. She was the first player in the history of the ANZ Championship to win three premierships; the first with the New South Wales Swifts in 2008 and the second and third with the Adelaide Thunderbirds in 2010 and 2013.

== ANZ Championship ==
Bell played with the NSW Swifts for the first two years of the ANZ Championship. Unhappy with the amount of court time she received, she moved to the Adelaide Thunderbirds in 2010. She helped secure a premiership for the Thunderbirds, playing at GA in the Grand Final. Bell remained with the Thunderbirds for the remainder of the ANZ Championship and took over as captain for the 2016 season.

== Super Netball ==
In 2017 Bell re-signed with the Adelaide Thunderbirds in the new Suncorp Super Netball league and was reappointed captain. Bell led the Thunderbirds to a disappointing season, finishing last on the ladder. She left the Thunderbirds at the end of the season to join the Collingwood Magpies, where she filled an important goal attack/shooter role alongside Caitlin Thwaites. Bell announced her retirement from professional netball at the end of the 2018 season.

== Australian Diamonds ==
Bell made her international debut for Australia during the 2011 World Netball Championships. She played a pivotal role in earning Australia the 2011 Constellation Cup title, replacing Natalie Medhurst at GA during the third and deciding match. After not making the 2014 Commonwealth Games team, she was co-captained Australia at the 2014 Fast5 Netball World Series. Bell worked her way back in to the Diamonds squad ahead of the 2015 Netball World Cup. She again was selected for the 2016 Fast5 Netball World Series.
