= 2014 Melbourne Vixens season =

Melbourne Vixens season

Melbourne Vixens
- 2014 season
- Head coach: Simone McKinnis
- Asst. coach: Diane Honey
- Manager: Donna Monteath
- Captain: Bianca Chatfield
- Vice-captain: Madison Robinson
- Main venue: Hisense Arena

Season results
- Wins–losses: 11–4
- Regular season: 1st
- Finals placing: 1st
- Team colours

Melbourne Vixens seasons
- ← 2013 2015 →

The 2014 Melbourne Vixens season saw Melbourne Vixens compete in the 2014 ANZ Championship. With a team coached by Simone McKinnis, captained by Bianca Chatfield and also featuring Tegan Caldwell, Geva Mentor, Madison Robinson and Catherine Cox, Melbourne Vixens won both the minor premiership and the overall championship. Vixens defeated Queensland Firebirds in both the major semi-final and the grand final as they won their second premiership. They won their first in 2009.

== Players ==
=== Player movements ===
Gains and losses
▲ Gains	▼ Losses
Catherine Cox (West Coast Fever); Caitlyn Strachan (Victorian Fury); Elizabeth Watson (Victorian Flames); Joanna Weston (Australian Institute of Sport)	Johannah Curran (Victorian Fury); Shannon Eagland (Victorian Fury); Elissa Kent (pregnancy); Micaela Wilson (New South Wales Swifts); Sharelle McMahon (retirement)

=== Squad ===
2014 Melbourne Vixens roster
Players
Coaching staff

Nat.	Name	Position(s)	DoB	Height
(Australia)	Karyn Bailey	GS, GA	28 July 1986 (aged 27)	1.92 m (6 ft 4 in)
(Australia)	Tegan Caldwell	GA, GS	3 September 1988 (aged 25)	1.75 m (5 ft 9 in)
(Australia)	Bianca Chatfield (c)	GK, GD, WD	2 April 1982 (aged 31)	1.89 m (6 ft 2 in)
(Australia)	Catherine Cox	GS, GA	24 May 1976 (aged 37)	1.88 m (6 ft 2 in)
(Australia)	Erin Hoare	GS, GA	17 June 1989 (aged 24)	1.94 m (6 ft 4 in)
(England)	Geva Mentor	GK, GD	17 September 1984 (aged 29)	1.88 m (6 ft 2 in)
(Australia)	Kate Moloney	C, WD	8 January 1993 (aged 21)	1.76 m (5 ft 9 in)
(Australia)	Madison Robinson (vc)	WA, C	5 January 1988 (aged 26)	1.68 m (5 ft 6 in)
(Australia)	Amy Steel	GD, GK, WD	7 April 1989 (aged 24)	1.90 m (6 ft 3 in)
(Australia)	Caitlyn Strachan	WA, C	1 June 1987 (aged 26)	1.73 m (5 ft 8 in)
(Australia)	Elizabeth Watson	C, WA	30 March 1994 (aged 19)	1.78 m (5 ft 10 in)
(Australia)	Joanna Weston	GD, WD, GK	14 February 1994 (aged 20)	1.88 m (6 ft 2 in)

Head coach

- (Australia) Simone McKinnis

Assistant coach

- (Australia) Diane Honey

Manager:
Donna Monteath
Specialist Coaches: Sharelle McMahon
Stacey West
Physiotherapist:
Heidi Pollington
Kirsty Barnes

Notes

- (c) – Captain
- (cc) – Co-captain
- (vc) – Vice-captain
- – Injury / maternity leave
- (TRP) – Temporary Replacement Player

Notes

- ^1 Erin Hoare, Amy Steel, Caitlyn Strachan and Joanna Weston were also members of the 2014 Victorian Fury squad.

=== Milestones ===
- Tegan Caldwell made her 50th ANZ Championship appearance in Round 6 against Queensland Firebirds.
- Geva Mentor made her 100th ANZ Championship appearance in Round 13 against Adelaide Thunderbirds. Mentor became the first import player to reach 100 games.
- Catherine Cox made her 250th senior club appearance in Round 10 against New South Wales Swifts. Cox subsequently announced her retirement at the end of the season.

=== Gold medallists ===
Tegan Caldwell, Bianca Chatfield and Madison Robinson were all members of the Australia team that won the gold medal at the 2014 Commonwealth Games. The squad also included four former Vixens' players – Julie Corletto, Renae Hallinan, Sharni Layton and Caitlin Thwaites.

== Regular season ==
=== Fixtures and results ===
Round 1

Sunday 2 March	Melbourne Vixens	58 – 34	Northern Mystics	Hisense Arena
2:18pm	Tegan Caldwell 21/28 (75%); Karyn Bailey 28/33 (85%); Catherine Cox 9/14 (64%)	Report; Stats	Maria Tutaia 16/27 (59%); Cathrine Latu 15/20 (75%); Bailey Mes 3/10 (30%)

Round 2

Sunday 9 March	West Coast Fever	56 – 65	Melbourne Vixens	Challenge Stadium
9:18am	Caitlin Bassett 16/19 (84%); Natalie Medhurst 28/31 (90%); Kate Beveridge ?	Report; Stats	Tegan Caldwell 25/28 (89%); Karyn Bailey 35/42 (83%)

Round 3

Sunday 16 March	Melbourne Vixens	47 – 48	Queensland Firebirds	Hisense Arena
12:18pm	Tegan Caldwell 18/22 (82%); Karyn Bailey 29/37 (78%)	Report; Stats	Romelda Aiken 38/46 (83%); Amy Wild 10/16 (63%)

Round 4

Sunday 23 March	Melbourne Vixens	44 – 49	Waikato Bay of Plenty Magic	Hisense Arena
2:18pm	Tegan Caldwell 16/19 (84%); Karyn Bailey 18/19 (95%); Catherine Cox 10/13 (77%)	Report; Stats	Joanne Harten 28/35 (80%); Ellen Halpenny 21/26 (81%)

Round 5

Monday 31 March	Mainland Tactix	43 – 67	Melbourne Vixens	CBS Canterbury Arena
7:40pm	Mwai Kumwenda 30/38 (79%); Anna Thompson 9/15 (60%); Julianna Naoupu 4/9 (44%)	Report	Tegan Caldwell 24/26 (92%); Karyn Bailey 43/48 (90%)

Round 6

Monday 7 April	Queensland Firebirds	38 – 50	Melbourne Vixens	Brisbane Convention & Exhibition Centre
7:48pm	Romelda Aiken 25/31 (81%); Amy Wild 9/12 (75%) ? ?	Report	Tegan Caldwell 28/32 (88%); Karyn Bailey 13/17 (76%) ? ?	Attendance: 3,100

Round 7

Sunday 13 April	New South Wales Swifts	50 – 56	Melbourne Vixens	Sydney Olympic Park Sports Centre
12:18pm	Caitlin Thwaites ? Susan Pratley 28/33 (85%)	Report	Tegan Caldwell ? Karyn Bailey ? Catherine Cox 18/19 (95%)

Round 8

Saturday 19 April	Melbourne Vixens	64 – 26	Adelaide Thunderbirds	Hisense Arena
2:18pm	Tegan Caldwell 12/16 (75%); Karyn Bailey 34/36 (94%); Catherine Cox 18/25 (72%)	Report; Stats	Carla Borrego ? Erin Bell ? Cody Lange 12/22 (55%)

Round 9

Saturday 26 April	Central Pulse	40 – 52	Melbourne Vixens	TSB Bank Arena
4:20pm	Donna Wilkins 18/23 (78%); Irene van Dyk 22/29 (76%)	Report; Stats	Tegan Caldwell 22/23 (96%); Karyn Bailey 30/35 (86%)

Round 10

Sunday 4 May	Melbourne Vixens	50 – 54	New South Wales Swifts	Hisense Arena
12:18pm	Tegan Caldwell 22/24 (92%); Karyn Bailey 14/18 (78%); Catherine Cox 14/18 (78%)	Report	Caitlin Thwaites 26/31 (84%); Susan Pratley 28/32 (88%)

Round 11

Melbourne Vixens received a bye.

Round 12

Sunday 18 May	Melbourne Vixens	65 – 46	West Coast Fever	Hisense Arena
12:18pm	Tegan Caldwell 37/43 (86%); Karyn Bailey 20/ 27 (74%); Catherine Cox 8/8 (100%)	Report	Caitlin Bassett 23/30 (77%); Natalie Medhurst 17/23 (74%)

Round 13

Sunday 25 May	Adelaide Thunderbirds	43 – 64	Melbourne Vixens	Netball SA Stadium
11:48am	Carla Borrego 22/28 (79%); Erin Bell 21/24 (88%)	Report	Tegan Caldwell 24/34 (71%); Karyn Bailey 26/29 (90%); Catherine Cox 14/16 (88%)

Round 14

Saturday 31 May	Southern Steel	65 – 64	Melbourne Vixens	Stadium Southland Velodrome
4:20pm	Jodi Brown 21/29 (72%); Jhaniele Fowler-Reid 44/48 (92%)	Report; Stats	Tegan Caldwell 34/38 (89%); Karyn Bailey 13/13 (100%); Catherine Cox 17/19 (89%)

=== Final table ===
2014 ANZ Championship ladder
Pos	Team	Pld	W	L	GF	GA	GD	G%	Pts
1	Melbourne Vixens	13	9	4	746	592	+154	126.0	18
2	Queensland Firebirds	13	9	4	694	623	+71	111.4	18
3	New South Wales Swifts	13	9	4	707	652	+55	108.4	18
4	Waikato Bay of Plenty Magic	13	8	5	727	672	+55	108.2	16
5	Southern Steel	13	7	6	792	809	−17	97.9	14
6	Central Pulse	13	7	6	658	675	−17	97.5	14
7	Northern Mystics	13	6	7	706	752	−46	93.9	12
8	Adelaide Thunderbirds	13	5	8	663	706	−43	93.9	10
9	West Coast Fever	13	4	9	689	724	−35	95.2	8
10	Mainland Tactix	13	1	12	694	871	−177	79.7	2
Updated 2 May 2021

Qualified for Major semi-final
Qualified for Minor semi-final

- Pld = Games played
- W = Win (2 points)
- L = Loss (0 points)
- GF = Goals For
- GA = Goals Against
- GD = Goals Difference (= GF−GA)
- G% = Goal percentage (= 100 × GF/GA)

Pts = Points

== Finals ==
Semifinals
9 June – John Cain Arena
Melbourne Vixens	52
Queensland Firebirds	47
8 June – Sydney SuperDome
New South Wales Swifts	49
Waikato Bay of Plenty Magic	50

Preliminary final
16 June – Brisbane Convention & Exhibition Centre
Queensland Firebirds	54
Waikato Bay of Plenty Magic	50

Grand final
22 June – John Cain Arena
Melbourne Vixens	53
Queensland Firebirds	42

=== Major semi-final ===
Monday 9 June; 5:48pm	Stats	Melbourne Vixens	52–47	Queensland Firebirds	Hisense Arena	Fox Sports; Sky Sport
Monday 9 June; 5:48pm	Stats	Scoring by quarter: 16–11, 11-13, 14–13, 11–12			Hisense Arena	Fox Sports; Sky Sport
Monday 9 June; 5:48pm	Stats	Tegan Caldwell 27/36 (75%); Karyn Bailey 25/29 (86%)		Romelda Aiken 35/41 (85%); Amy Wild 12/15 (80%)	Hisense Arena	Fox Sports; Sky Sport

=== Grand final ===
Sunday 22 June; 2:28pm	Stats	Melbourne Vixens	53–42	Queensland Firebirds	Hisense Arena; Attendance: 9,345	Fox Sports; Sky Sport
Sunday 22 June; 2:28pm	Stats	Scoring by quarter: 13–11, 11–11, 13–12, 16–8			Hisense Arena; Attendance: 9,345	Fox Sports; Sky Sport
Sunday 22 June; 2:28pm	Stats	Tegan Caldwell 30/33 (91%); Karyn Bailey 17/22 (77%); Catherine Cox 6/7 (86%)		Romelda Aiken 25/30 (83%); Amy Wild 17/21 (81%)	Hisense Arena; Attendance: 9,345	Fox Sports; Sky Sport

== Award winners ==
=== Vixens awards ===
Award	Winner
Sharelle McMahon Medal	(England) Geva Mentor
Player of the Finals	(England) Geva Mentor
Coaches Award	(Australia) Kate Moloney
Rookie of the Year	(Australia) Elizabeth Watson
Outstanding Service Award	Nicholas Sanders
Excellence in Sport and Life Award	(Australia) Amy Steel

=== ANZ Championship awards ===
Award	Winner
ANZ Championship Grand Final MVP	(Australia) Tegan Caldwell

=== All Stars ===
Position	Player
WA	(Australia) Madison Robinson
GK	(England) Geva Mentor

=== Australian Netball Awards ===
Award	Winner
Liz Ellis Diamond	Madison Robinson
Australian ANZ Championship Coach of the Year	Simone McKinnis
