= 2012 Melbourne Vixens season =

Melbourne Vixens season

Melbourne Vixens
- 2012 season
- Head coach: Julie Hoornweg
- Asst. coach: Eloise Southby-Halbish; Simone McKinnis
- Manager: Jennifer McIntyre
- Captain: Bianca Chatfield
- Vice-captains: Madison Browne; Chelsey Tregear
- Main venue: Hisense Arena

Season results
- Wins–losses: 10–3
- Regular season: 1st
- Finals placing: 2nd
- Team colours

Melbourne Vixens seasons
- ← 2011 2013 →

The 2012 Melbourne Vixens season saw Melbourne Vixens compete in the 2012 ANZ Championship. With a team captained by Bianca Chatfield and featuring Madison Browne, Julie Corletto and Geva Mentor, Vixens finished the season as minor premiers. In the major semi-final they defeated Northern Mystics 56–50. This was the first ever netball match held at Rod Laver Arena. However they lost the grand final 41–38 to Waikato Bay of Plenty Magic and finished the season as runners-up. After five years as head coach of Vixens, Julie Hoornweg announced her retirement at the end of the 2012 season.

== Players ==
=== Player movements ===
Gains and losses
▲ Gains	▼ Losses
Karyn Howarth (Victorian Fury); Kara Richards (Adelaide Thunderbirds); Ashlee Howard (West Coast Fever)	Renae Hallinan (Adelaide Thunderbirds); Kathleen Knott (Victorian Fury); Sharelle McMahon (pregnancy)

=== Squad ===
2012 Melbourne Vixens roster
Players
Coaching staff

Nat.	Name	Position(s)	DoB	Height
(Australia)	Kate Beveridge	GS, GA	25 July 1985 (aged 26)	1.93 m (6 ft 4 in)
(Australia)	Kelsey Browne (TRP)	WA, C	17 January 1992 (aged 20)	1.68 m (5 ft 6 in)
(Australia)	Madison Browne (vc)	WA, C	5 January 1988 (aged 24)	1.68 m (5 ft 6 in)
(Australia)	Tegan Caldwell	GA, GS	3 September 1988 (aged 23)	1.75 m (5 ft 9 in)
(Australia)	Bianca Chatfield (c)	GK, GD, WD	2 April 1982 (aged 30)	1.89 m (6 ft 2 in)
(Australia)	Julie Corletto	GD, WD, GK	10 October 1986 (aged 25)	1.84 m (6 ft 0 in)
(Australia)	Ashlee Howard	GA, GS	2 March 1988 (aged 24)	1.77 m (5 ft 10 in)
(Australia)	Karyn Howarth	GS, GA	28 July 1986 (aged 25)	1.92 m (6 ft 4 in)
(England)	Geva Mentor	GK, GD	17 September 1984 (aged 27)	1.88 m (6 ft 2 in)
(Australia)	Kara Richards	GD, GK	25 January 1988 (aged 24)	1.85 m (6 ft 1 in)
(Australia)	Chelsey Tregear (vc)	WA, C, GA	7 October 1983 (aged 28)	1.76 m (5 ft 9 in)
(Australia)	Sarah Wall	WA, C	16 October 1984 (aged 27)	1.74 m (5 ft 9 in)
(Australia)	Micaela Wilson	GK, GD	3 November 1992 (aged 19)	1.88 m (6 ft 2 in)

Head coach

- (Australia) Julie Hoornweg

Assistant coach

- (Australia) Eloise Southby-Halbish
  (Australia) Simone McKinnis

Manager: Jennifer McIntyre
Physiotherapist:
Heidi Pollington
Steve Hawkins

Notes

- (c) – Captain
- (cc) – Co-captain
- (vc) – Vice-captain
- – Injury / maternity leave
- (TRP) – Temporary Replacement Player

Notes

- ^1 Kelsey Browne was called up as a temporary replacement player for Round 1 and Round 2.
- ^2 Kelsey Browne, Ashlee Howard, Kara Richards and Micaela Wilson were also members of the 2012 Victorian Fury squad.

=== Milestones ===
- Karyn Howarth made her ANZ Championship debut in Round 1 against Queensland Firebirds.
- Julie Corletto and Madison Browne both made their 50th ANZ Championship appearances in Round 5 against Queensland Firebirds.
- Chelsey Tregear made her 50th ANZ Championship appearance in Round 14 against Southern Steel. Tregear subsequently announced her retirement at the Vixens awards ceremony.

== Tauranga Pre-Season Tournament ==
On 2, 3 and 4 March, Waikato Bay of Plenty Magic hosted a pre-season tournament at the TECT Arena in Tauranga. For the first time since 2008, all ten ANZ Championship teams competed at the same tournament. The ten teams were divided into two pools of five. Teams within each pool played each other once and the winners qualified for the final. Melbourne Vixens won their pool but subsequently lost the final 50–30 to Queensland Firebirds.

Final

Sunday 4 March	Queensland Firebirds	50–30	Melbourne Vixens	TECT Arena

== Regular season ==
Melbourne Vixens finished the regular season as minor premiers. After winning their first six matches, they lost to New South Wales Swifts in Round 7. They then lost three successive matches, another to Swifts and one to Northern Mystics. On 20 May in Round 8, against Mystics, Vixens were undone by Mystics defender Anna Harrison and her Harrison Hoist. Harrison made several vital blocks while being hoisted rugby union lineout-style by her defensive partners, helping Mystics secure a 49–45 win. However, Vixens successively claimed the minor premiership with three wins in the final three rounds.

=== Fixtures and results ===
Round 1

Sunday 1 April	Queensland Firebirds	42 – 47	Melbourne Vixens	Brisbane Convention and Exhibition Centre
14:20 (UTC+10:00)	Romelda Aiken 29/35 (83%); Natalie Medhurst 13/21 (62%)	Report; Stats	Kate Beveridge 15/19 (79%); Karyn Howarth 26/38 (68%); Tegan Caldwell 6/8 (75%)

Round 2

Sunday 8 April	West Coast Fever	41 – 50	Melbourne Vixens	Challenge Stadium
12:20 (UTC+08:00)	Caitlin Bassett 26/30 (87%); Catherine Cox 13/23 (57%); Nikala Smith 2/4 (50%)	Stats	Kate Beveridge 14/18 (78%); Tegan Caldwell 26/33 (79%); Karyn Howarth 10/12 (83%)

Round 3

Sunday 15 April	Adelaide Thunderbirds	34 – 48	Melbourne Vixens	Netball SA Stadium
13:50 (UTC+09:30)	Erin Bell 14/16 (88%); Carla Borrego 20/26 (77%)	Stats	Kate Beveridge 18/23 (78%); Tegan Caldwell 22/23 (96%); Karyn Howarth 8/12 (67%)

Round 4

Sunday 22 April	Melbourne Vixens	40 – 39	Waikato Bay of Plenty Magic	Hisense Arena
12:10 (UTC+10:00)	Kate Beveridge 18/23 (78%); Tegan Caldwell 17/21 (81%); Karyn Howarth 5/7 (71%)	Stats	Julianna Naoupu 9/17 (53%); Irene van Dyk 25/30 (83%); Jess Waitapu 5/7 (71%)

Round 5

Sunday 29 April	Melbourne Vixens	52 – 51	Queensland Firebirds	Hisense Arena
14:20 (UTC+10:00)	Kate Beveridge 12/16 (75%); Tegan Caldwell 27/33 (82%); Karyn Howarth 13/16 (81%)	Stats	Romelda Aiken 33/36 (92%); Natalie Medhurst 18/23 (78%)

Round 6

Monday 7 May	Canterbury Tactix	41 – 65	Melbourne Vixens	CBS Canterbury Arena
19:40 (UTC+12:00)	Ellen Halpenny 11/12 (92%); Joanne Harten 20/30 (67%); Anna Thompson 10/13 (77%)	Stats	Kate Beveridge 8/11 (73%); Tegan Caldwell 29/29 (100%); Karyn Howarth 28/34 (82%)

Round 7

Sunday 13 May	New South Wales Swifts	55 – 52	Melbourne Vixens	Allphones Arena
14:20 (UTC+10:00)	Carla Dziwoki 14/19 (74%); Susan Pratley 31/34 (91%); Amorette Wild 10/13 (77%)	Stats	Kate Beveridge 4/4 (100%); Tegan Caldwell 23/26 (88%); Karyn Howarth 25/31 (81%)

Round 8

Sunday 20 May	Melbourne Vixens	45 – 49	Northern Mystics	Hisense Arena
12:10 (UTC+10:00)	Kate Beveridge 12/16 (75%); Tegan Caldwell 20/23 (87%); Karyn Howarth 13/15 (87%)	Report; Stats	Cathrine Latu 23/24 (96%); Maria Tutaia 26/34 (76%)

Round 9

Sunday 27 May	Melbourne Vixens	43 – 49	New South Wales Swifts	Hisense Arena
14:20 (UTC+10:00)	Kate Beveridge 18/22 (82%); Tegan Caldwell 11/11 (100%); Karyn Howarth 14/16 (88%)	Stats	Carla Dziwoki 4/6 (67%); Susan Pratley 32/37 (86%); Amorette Wild 13/16 (81%)

Round 10

Sunday 3 June	Melbourne Vixens	48 – 40	Adelaide Thunderbirds	Hisense Arena
14:20 (UTC+10:00)	Kate Beveridge 30/36 (83%); Tegan Caldwell 15/20 (75%); Karyn Howarth 3/4 (75%)	Report	Erin Bell ? Carla Borrego ?	Attendance: 7,212

Round 11

Melbourne Vixens received a bye.

Round 12

Sunday 17 June	Melbourne Vixens	50 – 49	West Coast Fever	Hisense Arena
12:10 (UTC+10:00)	Kate Beveridge 3/6 (50%); Tegan Caldwell 14/16 (88%); Karyn Howarth 28/33 (85%)	Report; Stats	Caitlin Bassett 32/35 (91%); Catherine Cox ?	Attendance: 7,395

Round 13

Monday 25 June	Central Pulse	41 – 49	Melbourne Vixens	Te Rauparaha Arena
19:40 (UTC+12:00)	Paula Griffin; Caitlin Thwaites	Report	Tegan Caldwell 12/14 (86%); Karyn Howarth 37/42 (88%)

Round 14

Saturday 30 June	Southern Steel	38 – 56	Melbourne Vixens	Invercargill ILT Velodrome
16:20 (UTC+12:00)	Jodi Brown ? Donna Wilkins ? Te Paea Selby-Rickit ?	Report	Kate Beveridge 4/4 (100%); Tegan Caldwell 26/28 (93%); Karyn Howarth 26/30 (87%)

=== Final table ===
2012 ANZ Championship ladder
Pos	Team	Pld	W	L	GF	GA	GD	G%	Pts
1	Melbourne Vixens	13	10	3	645	569	76	113.36	20
2	Northern Mystics	13	10	3	667	633	34	105.37	20
3	Waikato Bay of Plenty Magic	13	9	4	699	594	105	117.68	18
4	Adelaide Thunderbirds	13	9	4	670	589	81	113.75	18
5	New South Wales Swifts	13	8	5	624	638	-14	97.81	16
6	Queensland Firebirds	13	7	6	686	640	46	107.19	14
7	Central Pulse	13	5	8	585	626	-41	93.45	10
8	West Coast Fever	13	3	10	608	673	-65	90.34	6
9	Southern Steel	13	2	11	639	728	-89	87.77	4
10	Canterbury Tactix	13	2	11	634	767	-133	82.66	4
Updated 28 March 2021

Qualified for Major semi-final
Qualified for Minor semi-final

- Pld = Games played
- W = Win (2 points)
- L = Loss (0 points)
- GF = Goals For
- GA = Goals Against
- GD = Goals Difference (= GF−GA)
- G% = Goal percentage (= 100 × GF/GA)

Pts = Points

== Finals ==
Semifinals
8 July – Rod Laver Arena
Melbourne Vixens	56
Northern Mystics	50
9 July – Claudelands Arena
Waikato Bay of Plenty Magic	49
Adelaide Thunderbirds	48

Preliminary final
16 July – Trusts Stadium
Northern Mystics	48
Waikato Bay of Plenty Magic	57

Grand final
22 July – Hisense Arena
Melbourne Vixens	38
Waikato Bay of Plenty Magic	41

=== Major semi-final ===
Sunday 8 July; 14:20 (UTC+10)	Stats	Melbourne Vixens	56–50	Northern Mystics	Rod Laver Arena
Sunday 8 July; 14:20 (UTC+10)	Stats	Scoring by quarter: 11-15, 13-14, 16-11, 16-10			Rod Laver Arena
Sunday 8 July; 14:20 (UTC+10)	Stats	Karyn Howarth 33/40 (83%); Tegan Caldwell 23/26 (88%)		Cathrine Latu 30/32 (94%); Maria Tutaia 20/23 (87%)	Rod Laver Arena

=== Grand final ===
Sunday 22 July; 14:30 (UTC+10)	Melbourne Vixens	38–41	Waikato Bay of Plenty Magic	Hisense Arena; Attendance: 10,500
Sunday 22 July; 14:30 (UTC+10)	Scoring by quarter: 8-7, 14-11, 9-10, 7-13			Hisense Arena; Attendance: 10,500
Sunday 22 July; 14:30 (UTC+10)	Karyn Howarth 22/29 (76%); Tegan Caldwell 16/26 (62%)		Irene van Dyk 25/26 (96%); Julianna Naoupu 16/24 (67%)	Hisense Arena; Attendance: 10,500

== Award winners ==
=== Vixens awards ===
Award	Winner
Best and Fairest	Geva Mentor
Player of the Finals	Madison Browne
Coaches’ Award	Chelsey Tregear
Rookie of the Year	Karyn Howarth
Outstanding Service Award	Jennifer McIntyre
Excellence in Sport and Life Award	Bianca Chatfield

=== All Stars ===
Position	Player
WA	(Australia) Madison Browne
WD	(Australia) Julie Corletto
GK	(England) Geva Mentor

=== Australian Netball Awards ===
Award	Winner
Australian ANZ Championship Player of the Year	(Australia) Madison Browne
Liz Ellis Diamond	(Australia) Madison Browne
Australian ANZ Championship Coach of the Year	(Australia) Julie Hoornweg
