= 2009 Melbourne Vixens season =

Melbourne Vixens season

Melbourne Vixens
- 2009 season
- Head coach: Julie Hoornweg
- Asst. coach: Carol Byers; Cathy Fellows
- Manager: Bree McDonald
- Co-captains: Bianca Chatfield; Sharelle McMahon
- Main venue: Hisense Arena

Season results
- Wins–losses: 14–1
- Regular season: 1st
- Finals placing: Champions
- Team colours

Melbourne Vixens seasons
- ← 2008 2010 →

The 2009 Melbourne Vixens season saw Melbourne Vixens play in the 2009 ANZ Championship. With a team co-captained by Bianca Chatfield and Sharelle McMahon, Melbourne Vixens won 12 of their 13 matches during the regular season and finished as minor premiers. Vixens subsequently defeated Waikato Bay of Plenty Magic 58–43 in the major semi-final and Adelaide Thunderbirds 54–46 in the grand final to finish as overall premiers. Vixens hosted the grand final on Sunday 26 July at Hisense Arena.

== Players ==
=== Transfers ===
Summary of 2009 player movements
▲ Gains	▼ Losses
Ama Agbeze (West Coast Fever); Kathleen Knott (Victorian Fury); Chelsey Nash (Victorian Fury); Brooke Thompson (Victorian Fury); Sarah Wall	Madison Browne (West Coast Fever); Johannah Curran (West Coast Fever)

=== 2009 team ===
2009 Melbourne Vixens roster
Players
Coaching staff

Nat.	Name	Position(s)	DoB	Height
(England)	Ama Agbeze	GD, GK, WD	12 November 1982 (aged 26)	1.84 m (6 ft 0 in)
(Australia)	Bianca Chatfield (cc)	GK, GD, WD	2 April 1982 (aged 27)	1.89 m (6 ft 2 in)
(Australia)	Natasha Chokljat	C, WD, WA	27 April 1979 (aged 29)	1.76 m (5 ft 9 in)
(Australia)	Julie Prendergast	GD, WD, GK	10 October 1986 (aged 22)	1.84 m (6 ft 0 in)
(Australia)	Renae Hallinan	WD, C	18 July 1986 (aged 22)	1.78 m (5 ft 10 in)
(Australia)	Ashlee Howard	GA, GS	2 March 1988 (aged 21)	1.77 m (5 ft 10 in)
(Australia)	Kathleen Knott	GS, GA	19 September 1987 (aged 21)	1.83 m (6 ft 0 in)
(Australia)	Sharelle McMahon (cc)	GA, GS	12 August 1977 (aged 31)	1.77 m (5 ft 10 in)
(Australia)	Chelsey Nash	WA, C, GA	7 October 1983 (aged 25)	1.76 m (5 ft 9 in)
(Australia)	Amy Steel	GD, GK, WD	7 April 1989 (aged 19)	1.90 m (6 ft 3 in)
(Australia)	Brooke Thompson	GD, GK, WD	27 April 1984 (aged 31)	1.80 m (5 ft 11 in)
(Australia)	Caitlin Thwaites	GS, GA	29 December 1986 (aged 22)	1.88 m (6 ft 2 in)
(Australia)	Sarah Wall	WA, C	16 October 1984 (aged 24)	1.74 m (5 ft 9 in)

Head coach

- (Australia) Julie Hoornweg

Assistant coaches

- (Australia) Carol Byers
- (Australia) Cathy Fellows

Manager: Bree McDonald
Physiotherapist:
Steve Hawkins
Heidi Pollington
Masseurs:
Gamal Darwish
Gillian Niven

Notes

- (c) – Captain
- (cc) – Co-captain
- (vc) – Vice-captain
- – Injury / maternity leave
- (TRP) – Temporary Replacement Player

== Pre-season ==
In March 2009, Melbourne Vixens played in the 2009 SOPA Cup, hosted by Netball New South Wales at the Sydney Olympic Park Sports Centre. Vixens finished third in the tournament behind New South Wales Swifts and Adelaide Thunderbirds.

== Regular season ==
Melbourne Vixens won 12 of their 13 matches during the regular season. Their only defeat came in Round 10 against Waikato Bay of Plenty Magic, their main challengers for top spot. Vixens had to win their final two home matches with plenty of goals to guarantee top place. After a 63–35 win against Canterbury Tactix in Round 13, Vixens' defeated Central Pulse 80–39 in Round 14 to secure the minor premiership.

=== Fixtures and results ===
Round 1

Saturday 4 April	Melbourne Vixens	57–44	West Coast Fever	State Netball Hockey Centre
14:00 (UTC+10)	Sharelle McMahon 29/35 (83%); Caitlin Thwaites 24/28 (86%); Ashlee Howard 4/5 (80%)	Report; Stats	Caitlin Bassett 38/47 (81%); Bianca Franklin 3/4 (75%); Nikala Smith 3/7 (43%)

Round 2

Monday 13 April	Queensland Firebirds	51–54	Melbourne Vixens	Brisbane Convention and Exhibition Centre
19:00 (UTC+10)	Romelda Aiken 42/49 (86%); Alissa Castrisos 5/7 (71%); Janelle Lawson 4/8 (50%)	Report; Stats	Sharelle McMahon 27/29 (93%); Caitlin Thwaites 27/34 (79%)

Round 3

Sunday 19 April	Adelaide Thunderbirds	43–49	Melbourne Vixens	ETSA Park
14:00 (UTC+10)	Kate Beveridge 28/37 (76%); Natalie Medhurst 15/19 (79%)	Report; Stats	Sharelle McMahon 21/28 (75%); Caitlin Thwaites 28/35 (80%)

Round 4

Saturday 25 April	Melbourne Vixens	48–31	Southern Steel	State Netball Hockey Centre
14:00 (UTC+10)	Sharelle McMahon 21/28 (75%); Caitlin Thwaites 27/35 (77%)	Report; Stats	Daneka Wipiiti 21/30 (70%); Donna Wilkins 10/16 (63%)

Round 5

Sunday 3 May	Melbourne Vixens	50–42	Adelaide Thunderbirds	Hisense Arena
14:30 (UTC+10)	Sharelle McMahon 17/21 (81%); Caitlin Thwaites 29/34 (85%); Ashlee Howard 4/4 (100%)	Stats	Kate Beveridge 28/37 (76%); Natalie Medhurst 15/19 (79%)

Round 6

Melbourne Vixens received a bye

Round 7

Sunday 17 May	West Coast Fever	49–74	Melbourne Vixens	Challenge Stadium
12:30 (UTC+10)	Caitlin Bassett 41/48 (85%); Bianca Franklin 6/8 (75%); Jasmine Keene 2/3 (67%)	Report; Stats	Sharelle McMahon 40/47 (85%); Caitlin Thwaites 29/34 (85%); Ashlee Howard 5/7 (71%)

Round 8

Monday 25 May	Melbourne Vixens	65–63	New South Wales Swifts	Hisense Arena
19:00 (UTC+10)	Sharelle McMahon 22/25 (88%); Caitlin Thwaites 43/51 (84%)	Q4: 54–54; Report; Stats	Catherine Cox 40/50 (80%); Susan Pratley 23/26 (88%)

Round 9

Sunday 31 May	Melbourne Vixens	57–53	Queensland Firebirds	Hisense Arena
14:30 (UTC+10)	Sharelle McMahon 29/31 (94%); Caitlin Thwaites 28/35 (80%)	Report; Stats	Romelda Aiken 39/52 (75%); Alissa Castrisos 7/8 (88%); Janelle Lawson 7/10 (70%)

Round 10

Monday 8 June	Waikato Bay of Plenty Magic	55–48	Melbourne Vixens	Queen Elizabeth Youth Centre
19:00 (UTC+10)	Irene van Dyk 35/36 (97%); Maria Tutaia 20/22 (91%)	Report; Stats	Sharelle McMahon 16/22 (73%); Caitlin Thwaites 32/36 (89%)

Round 11

Monday 15 June	New South Wales Swifts	52–63	Melbourne Vixens	Sydney Olympic Park Sports Centre
19:00 (UTC+10)	Catherine Cox 32/38 (84%); Susan Pratley 20/22 (91%)	Report; Stats	Sharelle McMahon 16/19 (84%); Caitlin Thwaites 47/52 (90%)	Attendance: 4,200

Round 12

Saturday 20 June	Northern Mystics	57–61	Melbourne Vixens	Trusts Stadium
14:00 (UTC+10)	Cathrine Latu 36/39 (92%); Pamela Cookey 21/22 (95%)	Report; Stats	Caitlin Thwaites 36/42 (86%); Ashlee Howard 25/27 (93%)

Round 13

Monday 29 June	Melbourne Vixens	63–35	Canterbury Tactix	Hisense Arena
19:00 (UTC+10)	Sharelle McMahon 32/37 (86%); Caitlin Thwaites 23/28 (82%); Kathleen Knott 8/12 (67%)	Report; Stats	Jodi Brown 20/29 (69%); Angela Mitchell 15/23 (65%)

Round 14

Saturday 4 July	Melbourne Vixens	80–39	Central Pulse	Hisense Arena
14:00 (UTC+10)	Sharelle McMahon 25/29 (86%); Caitlin Thwaites 37/42 (88%); Ashlee Howard 18/19 (95%)	Report; Stats	Paula Griffin 24/28 (86%); Te Amo Amaru-Tibble 8/11 (73%); Larissa Harrison 5/6 (83%); Jamilah Gupwell 2/3 (67%)

=== Final table ===
2009 ANZ Championship ladder
Pos	Team	Pld	W	D	L	GF	GA	G%	Pts
1	Melbourne Vixens	13	12	0	1	769	614	125.24	24
2	Waikato Bay of Plenty Magic	13	11	0	2	673	562	119.75	22
3	Adelaide Thunderbirds	13	10	0	3	698	579	120.55	20
4	Southern Steel	13	8	0	5	662	645	102.64	16
5	Queensland Firebirds	13	8	0	5	700	690	101.45	16
6	Canterbury Tactix	13	5	0	8	639	662	96.53	10
7	West Coast Fever	13	5	0	8	666	735	90.61	10
8	Northern Mystics	13	3	0	10	642	727	88.31	6
9	New South Wales Swifts	13	2	0	11	709	748	94.79	4
10	Central Pulse	13	1	0	12	594	790	75.19	2
Updated 20 February 2021

Qualified for Major semi-final
Qualified for Minor semi-final

- Pld = Games played
- W = Win (2 points)
- D = Draw (1 point)
- L = Loss (0 points)
- GF = Goals For (Total goals scored)
- GA = Goals Against (Total goals conceded)
- G% = Goal percentage (= 100 × GF/GA)
- Pts = Points

== Playoffs ==
=== Major semi-final ===
Sunday 12 July; 14:30 (UTC+10)	Melbourne Vixens	58–43	Waikato Bay of Plenty Magic	Hisense Arena
Sunday 12 July; 14:30 (UTC+10)	Scoring by quarter: 16-10, 14-14, 14-7, 14-12			Hisense Arena
Sunday 12 July; 14:30 (UTC+10)	Caitlin Thwaites 35/41 (85%); Sharelle McMahon 21/22 (95%); Ashlee Howard 2/2 (100%)		Irene van Dyk 24/25 (96%); Maria Tutaia 19/23 (83%)	Hisense Arena

=== Grand final ===
Sunday 26 July; 14:30 (UTC+10)	Melbourne Vixens	54–46	Adelaide Thunderbirds	Hisense Arena; Attendance: 9,500
Sunday 26 July; 14:30 (UTC+10)	Scoring by quarter: 13-13, 14-6, 14-13, 13-14			Hisense Arena; Attendance: 9,500
Sunday 26 July; 14:30 (UTC+10)	Caitlin Thwaites 31/39 (79%); Sharelle McMahon 23/28 (82%)		Kate Beveridge 28/34 (82%); Natalie Medhurst 18/23 (78%); Jane Altschwager 1/2 (50%)	Hisense Arena; Attendance: 9,500

== Award winners ==
=== Vixens awards ===
Award	Winner
Best and Fairest	Sharelle McMahon
Player of the Finals	Bianca Chatfield
Coaches’ Award	Renae Hallinan
Rookie of the Year	Chelsey Nash
Best Club Person	Bree McDonald
Excellence in Sport and Life Award	Renae Hallinan

=== Australian Netball Awards ===
Award	Winner
Liz Ellis Diamond	Julie Corletto
Australian ANZ Championship Coach of the Year	Julie Hoornweg

== Gallery ==
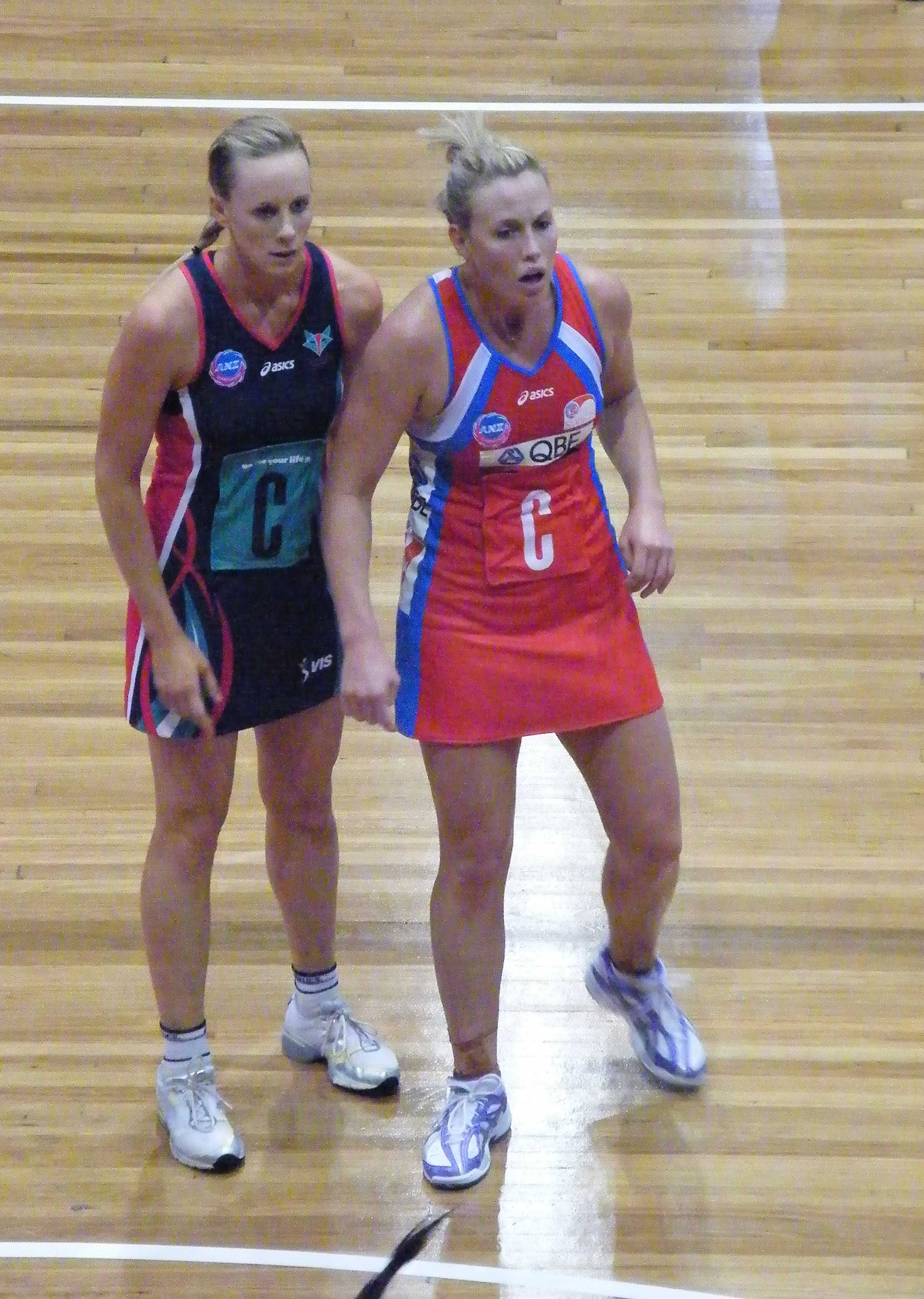
7 March 2009; Renae Hallinan (left) of Melbourne Vixens and Kimberlee Green (right) of New South Wales Swifts during the pre-season tournament, the 2009 SOPA Cup.
