= 2017 Suncorp Super Netball season =

- League: Suncorp Super Netball
- Sport: Netball
- Duration: 18 February – 17 June 2017
- Teams: 8
- TV partner: Nine Network
- Streaming partner: Telstra TV

Regular season
- Minor premiers: Melbourne Vixens
- Season MVP: Geva Mentor
- Top scorer: Caitlin Thwaites (594 goals)

Finals
- Champions: Sunshine Coast Lightning
- Runners-up: GIANTS Netball
- Grand Final MVP: Karla Mostert

Seasons
- 2018 →

The 2017 Suncorp Super Netball season was the inaugural season of the premier netball league in Australia, following the disbanding of the ANZ Championship in 2016. The regular season began on 18 February 2017 and concluded with the Grand Final on 17 June 2017.

Expansion team Sunshine Coast Lightning won the Grand Final, comfortably defeating GIANTS Netball at the Brisbane Entertainment Centre.

== Overview ==
The season was played over 14 rounds, allowing every team to play each other twice, once at home and once away. The top 4 teams on the standings at the conclusion of the regular season qualified for the finals series. In the first week of the finals series, the 1st ranked team hosted the 2nd ranked team in the major semi-final (with the winner of that match to qualify for the Grand Final) and the 3rd ranked team hosted the 4th ranked team in the minor semi-final (with the loser of that match eliminated). The loser of the major semi-final then hosted the winner of the minor semi-final in the preliminary final. The winner of the major semi-final then hosted the winner of the preliminary final in the Grand Final. YES

== Team captains and coaches ==
| Team | Captain | Coach | Ref. |
|---|---|---|---|
| Adelaide Thunderbirds | Erin Bell | Dan Ryan | Ref. |
| Collingwood Magpies | Madison Robinson | Kristy Keppich-Birrell | Ref. |
| GIANTS Netball | Kimberlee Green | Julie Fitzgerald | Ref. |
| Melbourne Vixens | Kate Moloney | Simone McKinnis | Ref. |
| New South Wales Swifts | Abbey McCulloch | Rob Wright | Ref. |
| Queensland Firebirds | Gabi Simpson | Roselee Jencke | Ref. |
| Sunshine Coast Lightning | Geva Mentor | Noeline Taurua | Ref. |
| West Coast Fever | Natalie Medhurst | Stacey Marinkovich | Ref. |

== Regular season ==
- All times are local; a full list of season results and match statistics can be found here

=== Round 1 ===
| 18 Feb | Giants Netball | 58–53 | New South Wales Swifts | Sydney Olympic Park Sports Centre |
| 5:00 pm | | | | Attendance: TBA |

| 18 Feb | Melbourne Vixens | 58–55 | Collingwood Magpies | Hisense Arena |
| 7:00 pm | | | | Attendance: 8,074 |

| 18 Feb | Queensland Firebirds | 56–56 | Sunshine Coast Lightning | Brisbane Entertainment Centre |
| 7:45 pm | | | | Attendance: 5,973 |

| 19 Feb | Adelaide Thunderbirds | 56–51 | West Coast Fever | Priceline Stadium |
| 12:30 pm | | | | Attendance: TBA |

=== Round 2 ===
| 25 Feb | New South Wales Swifts | 54–44 | Adelaide Thunderbirds | Qudos Bank Arena |
| 5:00 pm |

| 25 Feb | Giants Netball | 66–51 | West Coast Fever | Qudos Bank Arena |
| 7:00 pm |

| 25 Feb | Queensland Firebirds | 50–54 | Collingwood Magpies | Brisbane Convention & Exhibition Centre |
| 7:45 pm |

| 26 Feb | Sunshine Coast Lightning | 58–52 | Melbourne Vixens | University of the Sunshine Coast Stadium |
| 12:00 pm |

=== Round 3 ===
| 3 Mar | West Coast Fever | 47–60 | Queensland Firebirds | Perth Arena |
| 6:30 pm |

| 4 Mar | Collingwood Magpies | 51–59 | Giants Netball | Hisense Arena |
| 7:00 pm |

| 4 Mar | Melbourne Vixens | 59–59 | New South Wales Swifts | Hisense Arena |
| 8:45 pm |

| 5 Mar | Adelaide Thunderbirds | 42–51 | Sunshine Coast Lightning | Priceline Stadium |
| 12:30 pm |

=== Round 4 ===
| 10 Mar | Queensland Firebirds | 62–53 | New South Wales Swifts | Brisbane Convention & Exhibition Centre |
| 7:30 pm |

| 11 Mar | Melbourne Vixens | 56–45 | West Coast Fever | Hisense Arena |
| 7:00 pm |

| 11 Mar | Sunshine Coast Lightning | 54–55 | Giants Netball | University of the Sunshine Coast Stadium |
| 7:45 pm |

| 12 Mar | Collingwood Magpies | 64–45 | Adelaide Thunderbirds | Hisense Arena |
| 3:00 pm |

=== Round 5 ===
| 17 Mar | West Coast Fever | 50–45 | New South Wales Swifts | HBF Stadium |
| 6:30 pm |

| 18 Mar | Queensland Firebirds | 50–66 | Melbourne Vixens | Brisbane Entertainment Centre |
| 6:00 pm |

| 18 Mar | Sunshine Coast Lightning | 51–50 | Collingwood Magpies | Brisbane Entertainment Centre |
| 7:45 pm |

| 19 Mar | Giants Netball | 53–38 | Adelaide Thunderbirds | AIS Arena |
| 1:00 pm |

=== Round 6 ===
| 24 Mar | West Coast Fever | 49–66 | Sunshine Coast Lightning | HBF Stadium |
| 6:30 pm |

| 25 Mar | Melbourne Vixens | 59–51 | Giants Netball | Hisense Arena |
| 7:00 pm |

| 25 Mar | Adelaide Thunderbirds | 39–49 | Queensland Firebirds | Titanium Security Arena |
| 8:15 pm |

| 26 Mar | New South Wales Swifts | 54–55 | Collingwood Magpies | Sydney Olympic Park Sports Centre |
| 1:00 pm |

=== Round 7 ===
| 1 Apr | New South Wales Swifts | 56–59 | Giants Netball | Sydney Olympic Park Sports Centre |
| 7:00 pm |

| 1 Apr | West Coast Fever | 57–40 | Adelaide Thunderbirds | Perth Arena |
| 5:45 pm |

| 2 Apr | Sunshine Coast Lightning | 60–49 | Queensland Firebirds | University of the Sunshine Coast Stadium |
| 1:00 pm |

| 2 Apr | Collingwood Magpies | 56–60 | Melbourne Vixens | Hisense Arena |
| 3:00 pm |

=== Round 8 ===
| 7 Apr | Collingwood Magpies | 56–43 | West Coast Fever | Hisense Arena |
| 7:30 pm |

| 8 Apr | Queensland Firebirds | 51–55 | Giants Netball | Gold Coast Convention & Exhibition Centre |
| 7:00 pm |

| 8 Apr | Adelaide Thunderbirds | 54–75 | Melbourne Vixens | Priceline Stadium |
| 8:15 pm |

| 9 Apr | New South Wales Swifts | 50–55 | Sunshine Coast Lightning | Sydney Olympic Park Sports Centre |
| 1:00 pm |

=== Round 9 ===
| 22 Apr | Sunshine Coast Lightning | 59–50 | Adelaide Thunderbirds | Brisbane Entertainment Centre |
| 7:00 pm |

| 22 Apr | Queensland Firebirds | 55–50 | West Coast Fever | Brisbane Entertainment Centre |
| 8:45 pm |

| 23 Apr | Giants Netball | 56–59 | Collingwood Magpies | Qudos Bank Arena |
| 1:00 pm |

| 23 Apr | New South Wales Swifts | 54–62 | Melbourne Vixens | Qudos Bank Arena |
| 3:00 pm |

=== Round 10 ===
| 29 Apr | Melbourne Vixens | 70–59 | Sunshine Coast Lightning | Margaret Court Arena |
| 7:00 pm |

| 29 Apr | Adelaide Thunderbirds | 48–51 | New South Wales Swifts | Titanium Security Arena |
| 8:15 pm |

| 30 Apr | Collingwood Magpies | 61–59 | Queensland Firebirds | Silverdome |
| 12:00 pm |

| 30 Apr | West Coast Fever | 45–48 | Giants Netball | HBF Stadium |
| 12:00 pm |

=== Round 11 ===
| 5 May | New South Wales Swifts | 50–48 | West Coast Fever | Sydney Olympic Park Sports Centre |
| 7:30 pm |

| 6 May | Melbourne Vixens | 66–55 | Queensland Firebirds | Hisense Arena |
| 7:00 pm |

| 6 May | Collingwood Magpies | 49–56 | Sunshine Coast Lightning | Hisense Arena |
| 8:45 pm |

| 7 May | Adelaide Thunderbirds | 47–49 | Giants Netball | Priceline Stadium |
| 12:30 pm |

=== Round 12 ===
| 12 May | Sunshine Coast Lightning | 64–50 | West Coast Fever | University of the Sunshine Coast Stadium |
| 7:30 pm |

| 13 May | Collingwood Magpies | 62–50 | New South Wales Swifts | Hisense Arena |
| 7:00 pm |

| 13 May | Queensland Firebirds | 59–48 | Adelaide Thunderbirds | Brisbane Entertainment Centre |
| 8:45 pm |

| 14 May | Giants Netball | 56–52 | Melbourne Vixens | AIS Arena |
| 1:00 pm |

=== Round 13 ===
| 19 May | Giants Netball | 53–56 | Queensland Firebirds | Sydney Olympic Park Sports Centre |
| 7:30 pm |

| 20 May | West Coast Fever | 42–49 | Collingwood Magpies | Perth Arena |
| 6:45 pm |

| 20 May | Sunshine Coast Lightning | 63–49 | New South Wales Swifts | University of the Sunshine Coast Stadium |
| 7:00 pm |

| 21 May | Melbourne Vixens | 71–50 | Adelaide Thunderbirds | Margaret Court Arena |
| 3:00 pm |

=== Round 14 ===
| 27 May | New South Wales Swifts | 48–67 | Queensland Firebirds | Qudos Bank Arena |
| 5:00 pm |

| 27 May | West Coast Fever | 42–68 | Melbourne Vixens | Perth Arena |
| 6:45 pm |

| 27 May | Giants Netball | 55–56 | Sunshine Coast Lightning | Qudos Bank Arena |
| 7:00 pm |

| 28 May | Adelaide Thunderbirds | 47–49 | Collingwood Magpies | Titanium Security Arena |
| 12:30 pm |

== Standings ==
| # | Suncorp Super Netball Ladder | | | | | | | |
| # | Team | W | D | L | GF | GA | % | PTS |
|---|---|---|---|---|---|---|---|---|
| 1 | Melbourne Vixens | 11 | 1 | 2 | 874 | 774 | 118 | 23 |
| 2 | Sunshine Coast Lightning | 11 | 1 | 2 | 808 | 726 | 111 | 23 |
| 3 | Giants Netball | 10 | 0 | 4 | 773 | 728 | 106 | 20 |
| 4 | Collingwood Magpies | 9 | 0 | 5 | 770 | 730 | 106 | 18 |
| 5 | Queensland Firebirds | 7 | 1 | 6 | 778 | 756 | 103 | 15 |
| 6 | New South Wales Swifts | 3 | 1 | 10 | 726 | 792 | 92 | 7 |
| 7 | West Coast Fever | 2 | 0 | 12 | 670 | 779 | 86 | 4 |
| 8 | Adelaide Thunderbirds | 1 | 0 | 13 | 648 | 792 | 82 | 2 |

== Finals Series ==
=== Major Semi Final ===
| 3 June 2017; 4:00 pm | Report; Stats | Melbourne Vixens | 55–56 | Sunshine Coast Lightning | Margaret Court Arena; Attendance: 3,763 |
| 3 June 2017; 4:00 pm | Report; Stats | Scoring by quarter: 13–13, 13–12, 16–15, 13–16 | | | Margaret Court Arena; Attendance: 3,763 |
| 3 June 2017; 4:00 pm | Report; Stats | Kumwenda 33/38 (87%); Philip 22/26 (85%) | | Bassett 44/47 (94%); Wood 12/14 (86%) | Margaret Court Arena; Attendance: 3,763 |

=== Minor Semi Final ===
| 3 June 2017; 7:00 pm | Report; Stats | Giants Netball | 52–51 | Collingwood Magpies | Sydney Olympic Park Sports Centre; Attendance: 5,000 |
| 3 June 2017; 7:00 pm | Report; Stats | Scoring by quarter: 13–12, 13–12, 11–15, 15–12 | | | Sydney Olympic Park Sports Centre; Attendance: 5,000 |
| 3 June 2017; 7:00 pm | Report; Stats | Brice 29/33 (88%); Harten 23/25 (92%) | | Thwaites 37/45 (82%); Brown 14/16 (88%) | Sydney Olympic Park Sports Centre; Attendance: 5,000 |

=== Preliminary Final ===
| 10 June 2017; 7:00 pm | Report; Stats | Melbourne Vixens | 57–65 | Giants Netball | Hisense Arena |
| 10 June 2017; 7:00 pm | Report; Stats | Scoring by quarter: 12–15, 12–17, 14–19, 19–14 | | | Hisense Arena |
| 10 June 2017; 7:00 pm | Report; Stats | Kumwenda 37/44 (84%); Philip 20/26 (77%) | | Brice 42/44 (95%); Harten 23/25 (92%) | Hisense Arena |

=== Grand Final ===
| 17 June 2017; 7:00 pm | Report; Stats | Sunshine Coast Lightning | 65–48 | Giants Netball | Brisbane Entertainment Centre; Attendance: 8,999 |
| 17 June 2017; 7:00 pm | Report; Stats | Scoring by quarter: 13–15, 19–12, 16–11, 17–10 | | | Brisbane Entertainment Centre; Attendance: 8,999 |
| 17 June 2017; 7:00 pm | Report; Stats | Scoring by half: 32-27, 33-21 | | | Brisbane Entertainment Centre; Attendance: 8,999 |
| 17 June 2017; 7:00 pm | Report; Stats | Bassett 49/51 (96%); Wood 16/20 (80%) | | Brice 24/29 (83%); Harten 20/25 (80%); Pettitt 4/7 (57%) | Brisbane Entertainment Centre; Attendance: 8,999 |
| 17 June 2017; 7:00 pm | Report; Stats | Grand Final MVP: Karla Mostert | | | Brisbane Entertainment Centre; Attendance: 8,999 |

== Team of the Week Award ==
| Round | GS | GA | WA | C | WD | GD | GK | Ref. |
|---|---|---|---|---|---|---|---|---|
| Round 1 | – | – | – | – | – | – | – | – |
| Round 2 | S. Wallace (NSW) | T. Philip (MEL) | K. Green (GIA) | L. Langman (SCL) | A. McCulloch (NSW) | R. Bulley (GIA) | S. Layton (COL) | Ref. |
| Round 3 | C. Bassett (SCL) | G. Tippett (QLD) | L. Watson (MEL) | E. Burger (QLD) | G. Simpson (QLD) | F. Themann (ADE) | S. Poolman (GIA) | Ref. |
| Round 4 | C. Thwaites (COL) | G. Tippett (QLD) | K. Green (GIA) | L. Watson (MEL) | K. Mostert (SCL) | E. Mikaere (SCL) | S. Layton (COL) | Ref. |
| Round 5 | C. Thwaites (COL) | T. Philip (MEL) | E. Bell (ADE) | L. Scherian (SCL) | G. Simpson (QLD) | R. Bulley (GIA) | C. Bruce (WCF) | Ref. |
| Round 6 | C. Bassett (SCL) | T. Philip (MEL) | M. Robinson (COL) | C. Nevins (QLD) | R. Ingles (ADE) | R. Bulley (GIA) | S. Klau (NSW) | Ref. |
| Round 7 | M. Kumwenda (MEL) | T. Philip (MEL) | L. Watson (MEL) | S. Guthrie (GIA) | L. Langman (SCL) | K. Shimmin (QLD) | G. Mentor (SCL) | Ref. |
| Round 8 | C. Thwaites (COL) | T. Philip (MEL) | L. Watson (MEL) | S. Guthrie (GIA) | A. McCulloch (NSW) | K. Mostert (SCL) | S. Layton (COL) | Ref. |
| Round 9 | C. Thwaites (COL) | S. Pettitt (GIA) | M. Robinson (COL) | K. Maloney (MEL) | A. Brazill (COL) | R. Bulley (GIA) | A. Agbeze (ADE) | Ref. |
| Round 10 | M. Kumwenda (MEL) | S. Wood (SCL) | L. Watson (MEL) | M. Proud (NSW) | G. Simpson (QLD) | R. Bulley (GIA) | E. Mannix (MEL) | Ref. |
| Round 11 | M. Kumwenda (MEL) | S. Wood (SCL) | L. Watson (MEL) | S. Guthrie (GIA) | R. Ingles (ADE) | J. Weston (MEL) | G. Mentor (SCL) | Ref. |
| Round 12 | C. Thwaites (COL) | J. Harten (GIA) | M. Robinson (COL) | K. Ravaillion (COL) | A. Brazill (COL) | R. Bulley (GIA) | S. Poolman (GIA) | Ref. |
| Round 13 | C. Thwaites (COL) | G. Tippett (QLD) | L. Watson (MEL) | L. Langman (SCL) | G. Simpson (QLD) | F. Themann (ADE) | E. Mannix (MEL) | Ref. |
| Round 14 | C. Bassett (SCL) | G. Tippett (QLD) | K. Browne (SCL) | S. Guthrie (GIA) | R. Ingles (ADE) | J. Weston (MEL) | C. Bruce (WCF) | Ref. |

== Awards ==
The following players, coaches and umpires were awarded by Netball Australia for performances in the 2017 season:

- The Player of the Year Award was won by Geva Mentor of the Sunshine Coast Lightning.
- The Grand Final MVP Award was won by Karla Mostert of the Sunshine Coast Lightning.
- The Young Star Award was won by Liz Watson of the Melbourne Vixens.
- The Joyce Brown Coach of the Year award was won by Simone McKinnis of the Melbourne Vixens.
- The Lorna McConchie Umpire of the Year award was won by Josh Bowring of Victoria.
- The Leading Goalscorer Award was won by Caitlin Thwaites of the Collingwood Magpies, who scored 594 goals in the regular season.
- The following players were named in the Super Netball Team of the Year:

Attackers

- Goal Shooter: Mwai Kumwenda
  (Melbourne Vixens)
- Goal Attack: Tegan Philip
  (Melbourne Vixens)

Midcourters

- Wing Attack: Liz Watson
  (Melbourne Vixens)
- Centre: Laura Langman
  (Sunshine Coast Lightning)
- Wing Defence: Gabi Simpson
  (Queensland Firebirds)

Defenders

- Goal Defence: Jo Weston
  (Melbourne Vixens)
- Goal Keeper: Geva Mentor
  (Sunshine Coast Lightning)

Reserves

- Attack Reserve: Caitlin Thwaites
  (Collingwood Magpies)
- Midcourt Reserve: Serena Guthrie
  (GIANTS Netball)
- Defence Reserve: Rebecca Bulley
  (GIANTS Netball)
