= List of Australian netball premiers =

Australian netball premiers

The following is a list of Australian netball teams that have been premiers and minor premiers of the top level national league. Since 2017, this has been Super Netball. Previous top level national leagues have included the Esso/Mobil Superleague, the Commonwealth Bank Trophy and the ANZ Championship.

== Esso/Mobil Superleague ==
The Esso Superleague, later known as the Mobil Superleague, was the top level national Australian netball league between 1985 and 1996. The league was Australia's first national netball league.

=== Grand finals ===
Esso Superleague

Season	Winners	Score	Runners up	Venue
1985	Australian Institute of Sport	52–46	Manly-Warringah (NSW)	
1986	Australian Institute of Sport	61–35	East Doncaster (Victoria)	
1987	Melbourne Blues		Australian Institute of Sport	
1989	Sydney Tigers	57–36	Australian Institute of Sport	State Sports Centre
1990	Melbourne City	52–42	Adelaide Contax	State Sports Centre

Mobil Superleague

Season	Winners	Score	Runners up	Venue
1991	Sydney Pulsars	59–36	Adelaide Contax	Bruce Stadium
1992	Sydney Pulsars	59–45	Adelaide Contax	State Sports Centre
1993	Adelaide Garville	56–49	Sydney Electricity	State Sports Centre
1994	Adelaide Contax	61–58	Adelaide Garville	Adelaide Powerhouse
1995	Sydney Electricity	53–37	Melbourne Pumas	State Sports Centre
1996	Melbourne Pumas	59–39	Sydney Energy	Adelaide Powerhouse

=== Minor premierships ===
Seasons	Team
1989	Sydney Tigers
1990	Melbourne City
1991	Sydney Pulsars
1992	Adelaide Contax
1993	Sydney Electricity
1994	Adelaide Contax ?
1995	Sydney Electricity
1996	Sydney Energy

== Australian State Netball League ==
Australian State Netball League

=== Grand finals ===
Season	Winners	Score	Runners up	Venue
1993	Victoria	?	New South Wales	
1994	New South Wales	?	Victoria	
1995	South Australia	?	New South Wales	
1996	Victoria	?	New South Wales	

== Commonwealth Bank Trophy ==
The Commonwealth Bank Trophy, also referred to as the National Netball League, was the top level national Australian netball league between 1997 and 2007.

=== Grand finals ===
Season	Winners	Score	Runners up	Venue
1997	Melbourne Phoenix	58–48	Adelaide Thunderbirds	The Glasshouse
1998	Adelaide Thunderbirds	48–42	Sydney Swifts	ETSA Park
1999	Adelaide Thunderbirds	62–30	Adelaide Ravens	ETSA Park
2000	Melbourne Phoenix	52–51	Adelaide Thunderbirds	The Glasshouse
2001	Sydney Swifts	57–32	Adelaide Thunderbirds	State Sports Centre
2002	Melbourne Phoenix	49–44	Adelaide Thunderbirds	Vodafone Arena
2003	Melbourne Phoenix	47–44	Sydney Swifts	Sydney Super Dome
2004	Sydney Swifts	52–51	Melbourne Phoenix	Sydney Super Dome
2005	Melbourne Phoenix	61–44	Sydney Swifts	Vodafone Arena
2006	Sydney Swifts	65–36	Adelaide Thunderbirds	State Sports Centre
2007	Sydney Swifts	45–37	Melbourne Phoenix	Acer Arena

=== Minor premierships ===
Season	Winners
1997	Adelaide Thunderbirds
1998	Adelaide Thunderbirds
1999	Adelaide Thunderbirds
2000	Adelaide Thunderbirds
2001	Adelaide Thunderbirds
2002	Melbourne Phoenix
2003	Melbourne Phoenix
2004	Sydney Swifts
2005	Sydney Swifts
2006	Sydney Swifts
2007	Melbourne Phoenix

== ANZ Championship ==
The ANZ Championship, also known as the Trans-Tasman Netball League featured teams from both Australia and New Zealand. Between 2008 and 2016, it was the top-level league in both countries.

=== Grand finals ===
Season	Winners	Score	Runners up	Venue
2008	New South Wales Swifts	65–56	Waikato Bay of Plenty Magic	Acer Arena
2009	Melbourne Vixens	54–46	Adelaide Thunderbirds	Hisense Arena
2010	Adelaide Thunderbirds	52–42	Waikato Bay of Plenty Magic	Adelaide Entertainment Centre
2011	Queensland Firebirds	57–44	Northern Mystics	Brisbane Convention & Exhibition Centre
2012	Waikato Bay of Plenty Magic	41–38	Melbourne Vixens	Hisense Arena
2013	Adelaide Thunderbirds	50–48	Queensland Firebirds	Adelaide Entertainment Centre
2014	Melbourne Vixens	53–42	Queensland Firebirds	Hisense Arena
2015	Queensland Firebirds	57–56	New South Wales Swifts	Brisbane Convention & Exhibition Centre
2016	Queensland Firebirds	69–67	New South Wales Swifts	Brisbane Convention & Exhibition Centre

=== Minor premierships ===
Seasons	Team
2008	Waikato Bay of Plenty Magic
2009	Melbourne Vixens
2010	New South Wales Swifts
2011	Queensland Firebirds
2012	Melbourne Vixens
2013	Adelaide Thunderbirds
2014	Melbourne Vixens
2015	Queensland Firebirds
2016	Southern Steel

== Super Netball ==
Since 2017, the top level national league in Australia has been Super Netball.

=== Grand finals ===
Season	Winners	Score	Runners up	Venue	Attendance
2017	Sunshine Coast Lightning	65–48	Giants Netball	Brisbane Entertainment Centre	8,999
2018	Sunshine Coast Lightning	62–59	West Coast Fever	Perth Arena	13,722
2019	New South Wales Swifts	64–47	Sunshine Coast Lightning	Brisbane Entertainment Centre	
2020	Melbourne Vixens	66–64	West Coast Fever	Nissan Arena	
2021	New South Wales Swifts	63–59	Giants Netball	Nissan Arena	3,650
2022	West Coast Fever	70–59	Melbourne Vixens	RAC Arena	13,908
2023	Adelaide Thunderbirds	60–59	New South Wales Swifts	John Cain Arena	9,622
2024	Adelaide Thunderbirds	59–57	Melbourne Vixens	Adelaide Entertainment Centre	9,694
2025	Melbourne Vixens	59–58	West Coast Fever	Rod Laver Arena	15,013

=== Minor premierships ===
Season	Winners
2017	Melbourne Vixens
2018	Giants Netball
2019	Sunshine Coast Lightning
2020	Melbourne Vixens
2021	Giants Netball
2022	Melbourne Vixens
2023	New South Wales Swifts
2024	Adelaide Thunderbirds
2025	West Coast Fever

== List by records ==
Club	Premierships		Runners-up	
Club	Total	Season(s)	Total	Season(s)
Adelaide Thunderbirds	6	1998, 1999, 2010, 2013, 2023, 2024	7	1997, 2000, 2001, 2002, 2006, 2009, 2024
Melbourne Phoenix*	5	1997, 2000, 2002, 2003, 2005	2	2004, 2007
Sydney Swifts*	4	2001, 2004, 2006, 2007	3	1998, 2003, 2005
Melbourne Vixens	4	2009, 2014, 2020, 2025	2	2012, 2022
New South Wales Swifts	3	2008, 2019, 2021	3	2015, 2016, 2023
Queensland Firebirds	3	2011, 2015, 2016	2	2013, 2014
Australian Institute of Sport*^{(Note 1)}	2	1985, 1986	2	1987, 1989
Sunshine Coast Lightning	2	2017, 2018	1	2019
Sydney Pulsars*	2	1991, 1992	0	-
Waikato Bay of Plenty Magic**	1	2012	2	2008, 2010
Adelaide Contax*	1	1994	3	1990, 1991, 1992
Sydney Electricity/Sydney Energy*^{(Note 2)}	1	1995	2	1993, 1996
West Coast Fever	1	2022	3	2018, 2020, 2025
Adelaide Garville*	1	1993	1	1994
Melbourne Pumas*	1	1996	1	1995
Melbourne Blues*	1	1987	0	-
Sydney Tigers*	1	1989	0	-
Melbourne City*	1	1990	0	-
Giants Netball	0	-	2	2017, 2021
Manly-Warringah*	0	-	1	1985
East Doncaster*	0	-	1	1986
Adelaide Ravens*	0	-	1	1999
Northern Mystics**	0	-	1	2011

- * Defunct Club
- ** New Zealand based club that competes in the ANZ Premiership

== Notes ==
- ^1 Australian Institute of Sport played in the New South Wales State League.
- ^2 Sydney Energy played the 1993, 1994 and 1995 seasons as Sydney Electricity.
