= Kate Eddy =

Australian netball player

Personal information
- Born: 28 December 1996 (age 29) Melbourne, Victoria, Australia
- Height: 1.82 m (6 ft 0 in)
- School: Mount Waverley Secondary College

Netball career
- Playing positions: GD, WD, GK
| Years | Club team | Apps |
| 2018–2019 | New South Wales Swifts | 22 |
| 2020–2026 | Melbourne Vixens | 101 |
| 2027 (TP) | Melbourne Mavericks | |

Kate Eddy (born 28 December 1996) is an Australian netball player in the Suncorp Super Netball league, playing for the Melbourne Vixens.

Eddy was raised in Melbourne’s eastern suburbs, representing the Victoria state netball team at several underage levels before going on to play for the Victorian Fury in the Australian Netball League. She first played junior netball for local club Blackburn South Turtles in the Whitehorse Netball Association. She later played for Sale Magpies in the Gippsland League, winning a senior A grade premiership at just 16 years old in 2013.

In 2017 she was made a training partner at the Melbourne Vixens, though moved to Sydney to play for the Swifts in the Super Netball league during the 2018 season. She made her debut for the Swifts in round 1 of the season and played all 14 matches that year and was re-signed by the club ahead of the 2019 season. Eddy also represented Australia in the 2017 Netball World Youth Cup, where she was vice-captain.

In August 2019, Eddy was ruled out for the rest of the season with the Swifts, which saw them win their first premiership in 11 years. With Renae Ingles announcing her retirement from netball, Eddy was signed for the 2020 season with Melbourne Vixens, moving back to where she started her netball career. She has a sister called Rebecca Eddy, who is a teacher at Melbourne.

In August 2026, Eddy was left without a contract due to a communications breakdown between the Melbourne Vixens and her manager. In September 2026, Eddy was picked up by cross-town rivals Melbourne Mavericks as a training partner.

In 2021, Eddy was named alongside her Vixens teammates Emily Mannix and Hannah Mundy as development players for the Australian Diamonds squad.

Eddy currently studies a Bachelor of Health Sciences at Deakin University.
