= Ingrid Dick =

Australian netball player

Personal information
- Born: 14 January 1972 (age 54) Melbourne, Australia
- Height: 1.76 m (5 ft 9 in)

Netball career
- Playing positions: C, WD
Years	Club team	Apps
1997–2007	Melbourne Phoenix	
2008	West Coast Fever	
- Updated on 2009-03-13

Ingrid Dick (born 14 January 1972, in Melbourne, Australia) is an Australian netball player.

== Playing career ==
She played 141 matches in the Commonwealth Bank Trophy for the Melbourne Phoenix from 1997 to 2007. She is one of only 3 players to participate in 5 Commonwealth Bank Trophy Premierships. Dick moved across Australia to take a pivotal leadership role with the West Coast Fever, based in Perth, for the inaugural ANZ Championship in 2008. She is not playing in the 2009 season.

Throughout her career she has obtained sports scholarships to the Australian Institute of Sport and Victorian Institute of Sport. Dick also has been selected in various Australian squads over the years and also played for the Australia women's national handball team.
