= Demelza McCloud =

Australian netball player (born 1980)

Demelza Fellowes
Personal information
- Full name: Demelza Fellowes (formerly McCloud)
- Born: 5 August 1980 (age 46) Wodonga, Australia
- Height: 188 cm (6 ft 2 in)

Netball career
- Playing positions: GD, GK
| Years | Club team | Apps |
| 2010 | Melbourne Vixens | 5 |
| 2009 | Queensland Firebirds | |
| 2008 | Canterbury Tactix | |
| 2007 | Otago Rebels | |
| Years | National team | Caps |
| 2004–05 | Australia | |
- Updated on 2009-03-14

Demelza Fellowes (formerly McCloud; born 5 August 1980) is an Australian netball player. She was an Australian Institute of Sport scholarship holder. McCloud was selected in the Australian national team in 2004 and 2005. Domestically, she has played for the Adelaide Thunderbirds and Melbourne Kestrels in the Commonwealth Bank Trophy, and also played in New Zealand for the Otago Rebels in the 2007 National Bank Cup.

With the advent of the trans-Tasman ANZ Championship, Fellowes was rostered with the Canterbury Tactix in New Zealand for the inaugural season in 2008. For the 2009 season, she signed with the Queensland Firebirds.

In August 2009, Fellowes played for a World 7 team, coached by Julie Fitzgerald, that defeated New Zealand 2–1 in the 2009 Taini Jamison Trophy Series.

In 2010, Fellowes decided to retire from netball. However, in the first round of the 2010 ANZ Championship, she was called to play for the Melbourne Vixens to replace Julie Corletto. In that match, she played all four quarters at Goal Keeper.

In late 2011, Fellowes confirmed she would be returning to top level netball in 2012 for New Zealand franchise the Southern Steel in the ANZ Championship.

In 2013 she played again for the Queensland Firebirds and was named in the Australian squad at the end of the season to play a series against the Malawi Queens.

In 2015 she signed with the Tactix and plays with them currently.
