= Emily Mannix =

Australian netball player

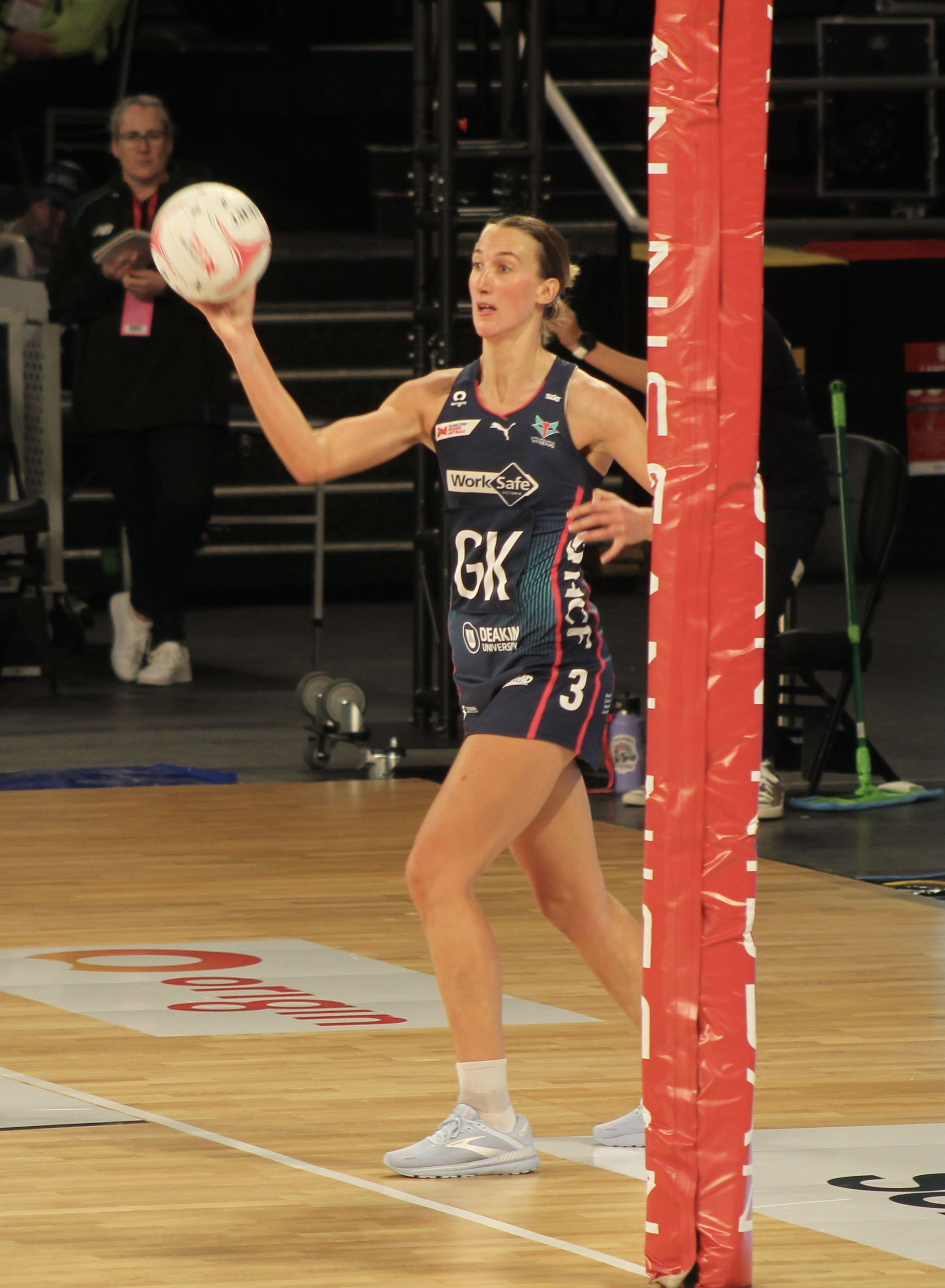
- Emily Mannix in 2024

Personal information
- Born: 16 April 1994 (age 32) Geelong, Victoria, Australia
- Height: 1.88 m (6 ft 2 in)
- Relative: Dylan Mannix
- School: Saint Ignatius College, Geelong; Geelong Grammar School

Netball career
- Playing positions: GK, GD
Years	Club team	Apps
2015–2026	Melbourne Vixens	135

Emily Mannix (born 16 April 1994) is an Australian netball player in the Suncorp Super Netball league, playing for the Melbourne Vixens.

== Early life ==
Mannix attended Geelong Grammar School on a sports scholarship and played netball for Drysdale in her junior years.

== Career ==
Originally from Geelong, Mannix made her debut for the Melbourne Vixens in 2015, working as a defensive understudy to Bianca Chatfield and Geva Mentor. She won the club Coaches Award in 2016 and was runner up in the club MVP in 2017, a run of form which culminated that year in her debut for the national team. She was selected in the Australian Diamonds squad for the 2018/19 international season.
