= Melbourne Kestrels =

Defunct Australian netball team

- Founded: 1997; 29 years ago
- Disbanded: 2007; 19 years ago
- Based in: Melbourne
- Regions: Victoria, Australia
- Home venue: State Netball and Hockey Centre; Waverley Netball Centre
- League: Commonwealth Bank Trophy
Uniform

Melbourne Kestrels were an Australian netball team that represented Netball Victoria in the Commonwealth Bank Trophy. Between 1997 and 2007, together with Melbourne Phoenix, they were one of two teams to represent Netball Victoria in the Commonwealth Bank Trophy era. In 2008, when the Commonwealth Bank Trophy was replaced by the ANZ Championship, Kestrels and Phoenix merged to form Melbourne Vixens.

== History ==
=== Commonwealth Bank Trophy ===
Regular season statistics

Season	Position	Won	Drawn	Lost
1997	8th	3	1	10
1998	5th	6	1	7
1999	3rd	10	0	4
2000	5th	6	0	8
2001	5th	5	0	9
2002	4th	8	0	6
2003	4th	9	0	5
2004	4th	9	0	5
2005	4th	7	0	7
2006	5th	6	0	8
2007	3rd	8	0	6

== Home venues ==
Kestrels played their home games at the State Netball and Hockey Centre and at the Waverley Netball Centre.

== Notable players ==
=== Internationals ===
Australia

- Shae Bolton
- Jenny Borlase
- Madison Browne
- Rebecca Bulley
- Julie Corletto
- Nicole Cusack
- Janine Ilitch
- Cynna Kydd
- Sharni Layton
- Demelza McCloud
- Shelley O'Donnell
- Nicole Richardson
- Amy Steel
- Caitlin Thwaites
- Chelsey Tregear

England

- Abby Sargent

=== CBT MVP ===
Season	Player
2004	Cynna Neele

=== CBT Best New Talent ===
Season	Player
2000	Cynna Neele
2006	Madison Browne
2007	Ashlee Howard

== Head coaches ==
Coach	Years
Lisa Alexander	1997
Marg Lind	1998–2002
Margaret Caldow	2002–2003
Jane Searle	2004–2007

== Sponsorship ==
Sponsors	Seasons
Akai	c. 1997–1999
Allied Pickfords	c. 2006–2007
