= Mark Browne (footballer) =

Australian rules footballer

Personal information
- Full name: Mark Browne
- Born: 19 November 1954 (age 71)
- Original team: Geelong West

Playing career^{1}
Years	Club	Games (Goals)
1974 — 1978	Geelong	87 (60)
- ^{1} Playing statistics correct to the end of 1978.

Mark Browne (born 19 November 1954) is a former Australian rules footballer who played for Geelong in the Victorian Football League (now known as the Australian Football League).

His daughters Madi and Kelsey are both Australian international netball players.
