= Kara Richards =

Australian netball player

Personal information
- Full name: Kara Richards
- Born: 25 January 1988 (age 38)
- Height: 1.85 m (6 ft 1 in)

Netball career
- Playing positions: GD, GK
Years	Club team	Apps
2008–2009	Victoria Fury	
2010	Melbourne Vixens	
- Updated on 29-1-2010

Kara Richards (born 25 January 1988) is an Australian netball player in the ANZ Championship, playing for the Melbourne Vixens.

After failing to make the Adelaide Thunderbirds 2012 list she is currently working as a Netball Coach alongside Wendy Jones (Former Vixen), Kristy Keppich Birrel (Victoria Fury Ass. Coach) & Ashlee Howard (Former Melbourne Vixen and West Coast Fever player) at the Rowville Sports Academy.
