= Bianca Chatfield =

Australia netball international

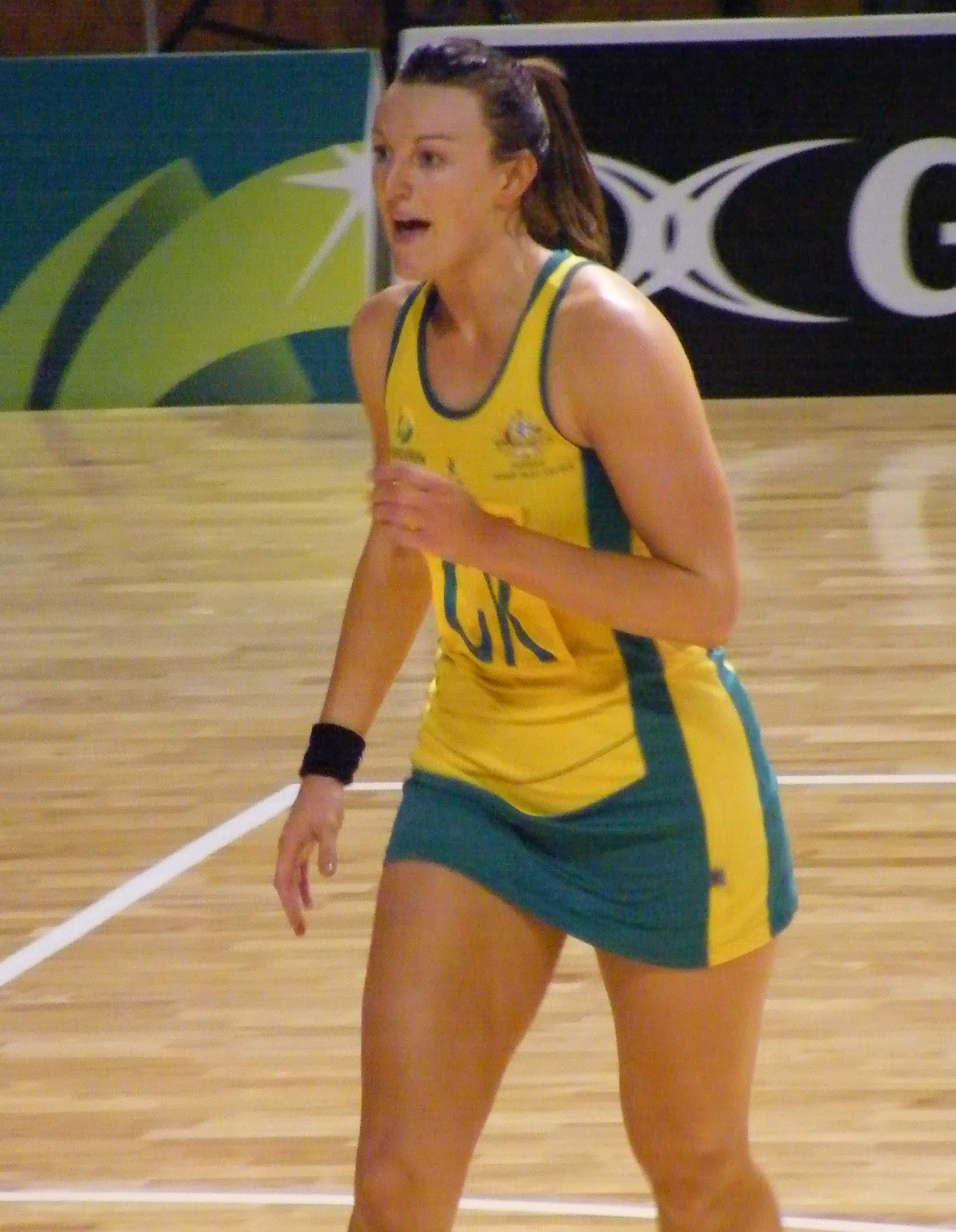
- 8 October 2008; Bianca Chatfield playing for Australia against England.

Personal information
- Full name: Bianca Lee Chatfield
- Born: 2 April 1982 (age 44) Somerville, Mornington Peninsula
- Height: 189 cm (6 ft 2 in)
- University: Deakin University

Netball career
- Playing positions: GK, GD, WD
Years	Club team	Apps
1998–2007	Melbourne Phoenix	133
2008–2015	Melbourne Vixens	111
Years	National team	Caps
2001–2014	Australia	59
Coaching career
- Years: Team
- 2015–: Victoria University
Medal record
Representing Australia
World Netball Championships
Gold medal – first place	2007 Auckland	Netball
Commonwealth Games
Gold medal – first place	2014 Glasgow	Team
Silver medal – second place	2006 Melbourne	Team
World Netball Series
Bronze medal – third place	2009 Manchester	Team
Bronze medal – third place	2011 Liverpool	Team

Bianca Chatfield (born 2 April 1982) is a former Australia netball international. Between 2001 and 2014 she made 59 senior appearances for Australia. Chatfield was a member of the Australia teams that won the gold medals at the 2007 World Netball Championships and the 2014 Commonwealth Games and the silver medal at the 2006 Commonwealth Games.

Between 1998 and 2007, Chatfield played for Melbourne Phoenix in the Commonwealth Bank Trophy league and between 2008 and 2015, she played for Melbourne Vixens in the ANZ Championship. During a thirteen year playing career she played in six premiership winning teams – four with Phoenix and two with Vixens. She captained Vixens for eight seasons, including when they won the 2009 and 2014 ANZ Championships.

Since retiring as a netball player, Chatfield has worked in various media and television roles, including as a Suncorp Super Netball commentator for Channel Nine. In 2018, together with Carla Dziwoki, she was a contestant on the home renovation show, The Block. She has most recently worked with Fox Sports Australia covering the netball (as of 2022) and cricket (as of 2024).

== Early life, family and education ==
Chatfield is originally from Somerville on Mornington Peninsula in Victoria. She has two sisters and her father works as a builder on the Peninsula. Between 2000 and 2003, Chatfield attended Deakin University where she gained a Bachelor of Applied Science (Human Movement) and a Bachelor of Education in Secondary Physical Education and Biology.

== Playing career ==
=== Melbourne Phoenix ===
Between 1998 and 2007, Chatfield made 133 appearances for Melbourne Phoenix in the Commonwealth Bank Trophy league. She made her debut with Phoenix aged 16. She subsequently helped Phoenix win premierships in 2000, 2002, 2003, 2005.

=== Melbourne Vixens ===
Between 2008 and 2015, Chatfield made 111 appearances for Melbourne Vixens in the ANZ Championship. She captained Vixens for eight seasons. Between 2008 and 2011, she shared the captaincy with Sharelle McMahon before taking over individually for the first time in 2012. Chatfield captained Vixens to premierships in 2009 and 2014. In 2009, Chatfield and McMahon co-captained Vixens as they won 12 of their 13 matches during the regular season and finished as minor premiers. Vixens subsequently defeated Waikato Bay of Plenty Magic 58–43 in the major semi-final and Adelaide Thunderbirds 54–46 in the grand final to finish as overall champions. In 2011, Chatfield was named as the Vixens' Most Valuable Player. In 2012, Chatfield captained Vixens when they finished the season as minor premiers. In the major semi-final they defeated Northern Mystics 56–50. However they lost the grand final 41–38 to Magic and finished the season as runners-up. In 2014, Chatfield captained Vixens as they won both the minor premiership and the overall championship. In 2015 Chatfield made her 100th ANZ Championship appearance in a Round 2 match against Thunderbirds. She was the first Vixens player to make 100 appearances. At the end of the 2015 season, Chatfield retired as a Vixens player.

=== Australia ===
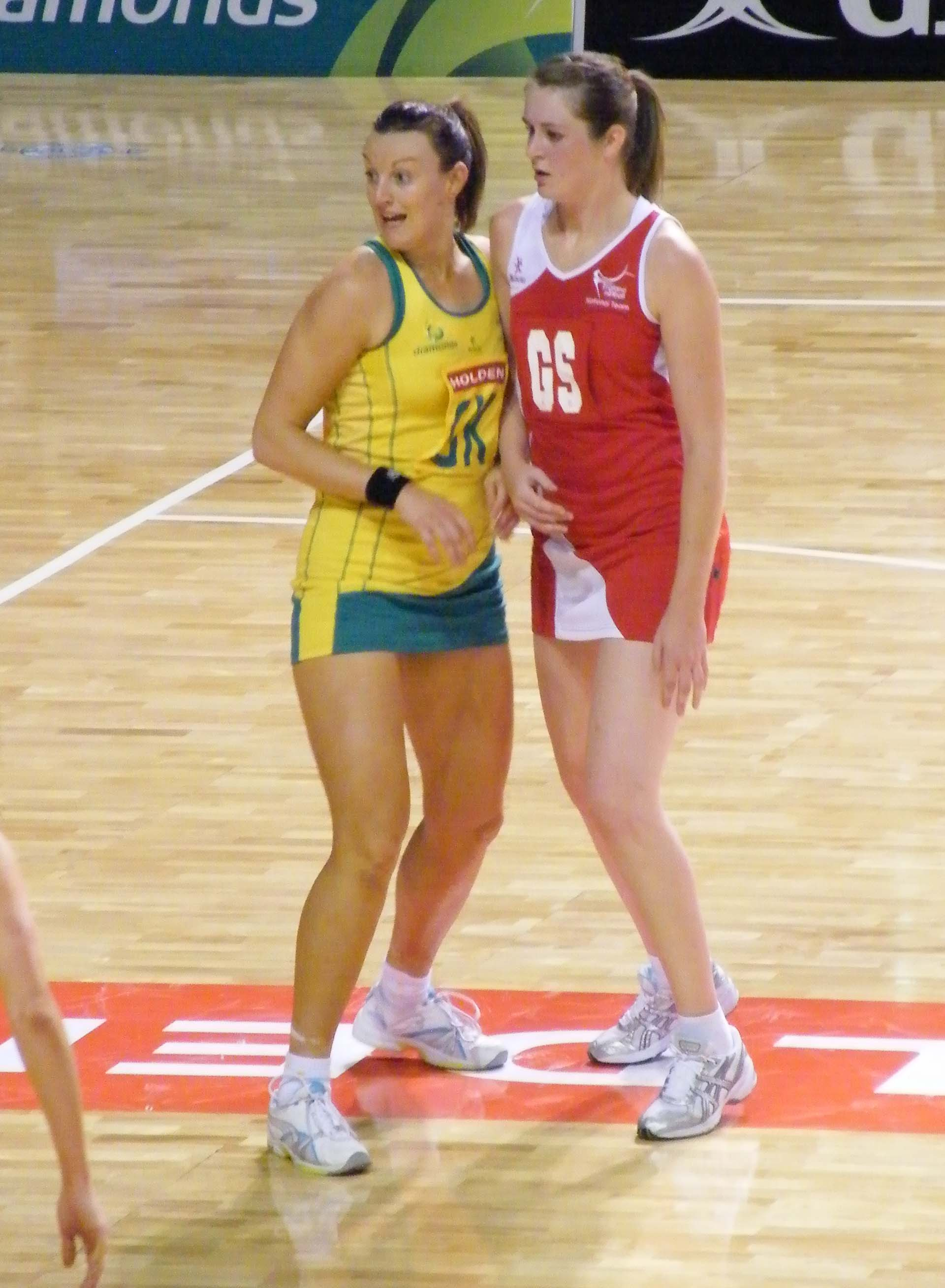
8 October 2008; Chatfield (left) playing for Australia and marking England's Louisa Brownfield.

Between 2001 and 2014 Chatfield made 59 senior appearances for Australia. On 28 March 2001, aged 18, she made her senior debut for Australia in an away match against England. She had previously represented Australia at under-17 and under-21 levels. She was subsequently a member of the Australia teams that won the gold medals at the 2007 World Netball Championships and the 2014 Commonwealth Games and the silver medal at the 2006 Commonwealth Games. Following the 2014 Commonwealth Games, Chatfield announced her international retirement.

Tournaments	Place
2006 Commonwealth Games	2nd place, silver medalist(s)
2007 World Netball Championships	1st place, gold medalist(s)
2009 World Netball Series	3rd place, bronze medalist(s)
2011 World Netball Series	3rd place, bronze medalist(s)
2012 Netball Quad Series	1st place, gold medalist(s)
2014 Commonwealth Games	1st place, gold medalist(s)

== Coach and teacher ==
Between April 2006 and December 2008 Chatfield worked as a secondary school teacher at Presbyterian Ladies' College, teaching physical education, health and science. Between January 2008 and December 2010, Chatfield worked as a community education co-ordinator with Essendon Football Club. Since January 2015, Chatfield has been head coach at the Victoria University Junior Netball Academy.

== Television ==
Since retiring as a netball player, Chatfield has worked in various media and television roles, including as a Suncorp Super Netball commentator for Channel Nine. In 2018, together with Carla Dziwoki, she was a contestant on the home renovation show, The Block.

Date	TV series	Channel	Role
2025	Claire Hooper's House Of Games	Self	5 episodes
2018	The Block	Channel Nine	Contestant
2019–	Women's Footy	Channel Nine	Host
20xx–	The House of Wellness	Seven	Presenter
20xx–	Offsiders	ABC TV/ABC News	Regular panelist

== Personal life ==
Aged 25, Chatfield purchased an apartment in Kew. She sold this apartment in December 2019. Since 2019, Chatfield has been in a relationship with Mark Scrivens, a 2019 contestant in the Australian version of Married at First Sight. They met after exchanging messages on Instagram. In July 2021, Chatfield purchased a Bayside townhouse for herself and Scrivens to live in.

== Honours ==
Australia

- World Netball Championships
  - Winners: 2007
- Commonwealth Games
  - Winners: 2014
  - Runners Up: 2006
- Netball Quad Series
  - Winners: 2012

Melbourne Vixens

- ANZ Championship
  - Winners: 2009, 2014
  - Minor Premierships: 2009, 2012, 2014

Melbourne Phoenix

- Commonwealth Bank Trophy
  - Winners: 2000, 2002, 2003, 2005
  - Runners up: 2004, 2007
