= Melbourne Phoenix =

Defunct Australian netball team

- Founded: 1997
- Disbanded: 2007
- Based in: Melbourne
- Regions: Victoria, Australia
- Home venue: State Netball and Hockey Centre; Melbourne Sports and Aquatic Centre; Waverley Netball Centre
- Premierships: 5 (1997, 2000, 2002, 2003, 2005)
- League: Commonwealth Bank Trophy
Uniform

Melbourne Phoenix were an Australian netball team that represented Netball Victoria in the Commonwealth Bank Trophy. Between 1997 and 2007, together with Melbourne Kestrels, they were one of two teams to represent Netball Victoria in the Commonwealth Bank Trophy era. Phoenix were the inaugural CBT champions and went on to become the competition's most successful team, winning five premierships. In 2008, when the Commonwealth Bank Trophy was replaced by the ANZ Championship, Phoenix and Kestrels merged to form Melbourne Vixens.

== History ==
=== Commonwealth Bank Trophy ===
Regular season statistics

Season	Position	Won	Drawn	Lost
1997	2nd	11	2	1
1998	2nd	11	2	1
1999	5th	6	8	0
2000	2nd	11	2	1
2001	3rd	11	3	0
2002	1st	12	1	1
2003	1st	13	1	0
2004	3rd	10	4	0
2005	2nd	12	2	0
2006	3rd	10	4	0
2007	1st	13	1	0

== Grand finals ==
Season	Winners	Score	Runners up	Venue
1997	Melbourne Phoenix	58–48	Adelaide Thunderbirds	The Glasshouse
2000	Melbourne Phoenix	52–51	Adelaide Thunderbirds	The Glasshouse
2002	Melbourne Phoenix	49–44	Adelaide Thunderbirds	Vodafone Arena
2003	Melbourne Phoenix	47–44	Sydney Swifts	Sydney Super Dome
2004	Sydney Swifts	52–51	Melbourne Phoenix	Sydney Super Dome
2005	Melbourne Phoenix	61–44	Sydney Swifts	Vodafone Arena
2007	Sydney Swifts	45–37	Melbourne Phoenix	Acer Arena

== Home venues ==
In 1997 and 1998, Phoenix played their home games at the Waverley Netball Centre. In 1999 they switched to the Melbourne Sports and Aquatic Centre. In later seasons they played at the State Netball and Hockey Centre.

== Notable former players ==
=== Internationals ===
Australia

- Natalie Avellino
- Bianca Chatfield
- Natasha Chokljat
- Julie Corletto
- Renae Hallinan
- Janine Ilitch
- Cynna Kydd
- Simone McKinnis
- Sharelle McMahon
- Eloise Southby-Halbish
- Chelsey Tregear
- Ingrid Dick
- Wendy Jones

England

- Abby Sargent

Scotland

- Fiona Themann

=== CBT MVP ===
Season	Player
2000	Sharelle McMahon
2003	Sharelle McMahon
2005	Sharelle McMahon
2007	Sharelle McMahon

=== CBT Best New Talent ===
Season	Player
2004	Julie Prendergast

== Coaches ==
=== Head coaches ===
Coach	Years
Norma Plummer	1996–1998
Joyce Brown	1999–2002
Lisa Alexander	2002–2004
Julie Hoornweg	2005–2007

=== Assistant coaches ===
Coach	Years
Roselee Jencke	2000

== Sponsorship ==
Sponsors	Seasons
Cenovis	c. 1997–1999
First National Real Estate	c. 2006–2007

== Premierships ==
- Commonwealth Bank Trophy
  - Winners: 1997, 2000, 2002, 2003, 2005: 5
  - Runners up: 2004, 2007: 2
