= Australian State Netball League =

Australia's premier netball league before the Commonwealth Bank Trophy

The Australian State Netball League was Australia's premier netball league before the era of the Commonwealth Bank Trophy. The league is currently running as the State Champs, but now with more regions. The big league ran from 1993 until 1996. It included all six states and the Northern Territory.

== Teams ==
- New South Wales
- Northern Territory
- Queensland
- South Australia
- Tasmania
- Victoria
- Western Australia

== History ==
1993

- Champion: Victoria
- Finalist: New South Wales
- 3rd: Queensland
- 4th: South Australia
- 5th West Australia
- 6th Tasmania
- 7th Northern Territory
- Largest Crowd: 5300 (Melbourne)
- Biggest Victory: New South Wales defeated Northern Territory 64–30
- Most Valuable Player: Nicole Cussack (New South Wales)
- Best Shooting: Vicki Wilson (Queensland)
- Best Defence record: victoria

1994

- Champion: New South Wales
- Finalist: Victoria
- 3rd: Queensland
- 4th: South Australia
- 5th: Western Australia
- 6th: Northern Territory
- 7th: Tasmania
- Largest Crowd: 6000 (Melbourne)
- Biggest Victory: Victoria def Tasmania 70–31
- Most Valuable Player: Shelley O'Donnell (Victoria)
- Best Shooting: Shelley O'Donnell (Victoria)
- Best Defence: New South Wales

1995

- Champion: South Australia
- Finalist: New South Wales
- 3rd: Victoria
- 4th: Western Australia
- 5th: Queensland
- 6th: Tasmania
- 7th: Northern Territory
- Largest Crowd: Sydney (5900)
- Biggest Victory: South Australia def Northern Territory 69–20, South Australia def Tasmania 70–21
- Most Valuable Player: Liz Ellis New South Wales
- Best Shooting: Vicki Wilson
- Best Defence: Victoria

1996

- Champion: Victoria
- Finalist: New South Wales
- 3rd: Western Australia
- 4th: Queensland
- 5th: Northern Territory
- 6th: South Australia
- 7th: Tasmania
- Largest Crowd: Melbourne (6300)
- Biggest Victory: West Australia def Tasmania 72–30, Victoria def Tasmania 74–32, Northern Territory def Tasmania 59–17
- Most Valuable Player: Vicki Wilson (Queensland)
- Best Shooting: Vicki Wilson
- Best Defence record: Northern Territory
