= Kelsey Browne =

Australian netball player (born 1992)

Personal information
- Born: 17 January 1992 (age 34) Geelong, Victoria, Australia
- Height: 1.64 m (5 ft 5 in)
- Relative: Madison Browne
- School: Belmont High School

Netball career
- Playing positions: WA, C
Years	Club team	Apps
2015–2016	Melbourne Vixens	
2017–2018	SC Lightning	
2019–2023	Collingwood Magpies	
2024	West Coast Fever	
2018–present	Australia	18

Kelsey Browne (born 17 January 1992) is a former Australian netball player who played for the West Coast Fever, Collingwood Magpies, SC Lightning and the Melbourne Vixens in the Suncorp Super Netball League. She is a two-time premiership player with the Lightning, and has also previously represented Australia internationally in the Quad Series and the Netball World Cup.

== Career ==
Browne began her professional netball career as a replacement player for the Melbourne Vixens in the 2015 ANZ Championship season. She played for the Victorian-based club for two seasons before having a breakout year in 2017 at the Sunshine Coast Lightning in the new Super Netball league, where she developed a reputation as one of the most ruthless wing-attack players in the competition. Browne has represented Australia at under 17, 19 and 21 levels. Browne took her game to another level in the 2018 season and was rewarded with a call-up to the Australia national netball team for the Quad Series and 2018 Constellation Cup. Shortly afterwards she was signed by the Collingwood Magpies, joining sister Madi Robinson at the club for the 2019 season. She returned to the Diamonds for the 2019 Quad Series before winning selection as one of the 12 players picked for the World Cup squad, where she and her teammates won a silver medal.

In Round 13 of the 2019 season, Browne suffered a serious injury to her knee, ruling her out for up to 12 months. Nonetheless, she was re-signed by the club until the end of the 2021 season.

Following the disbandment of the Collingwood Magpies from the Suncorp Super Netball league in 2023, Browne joined the Perth-based West Coast Fever in 2024. After one season playing for the Fever, Browne would transition into an off-field role as a club ambassador and training partner.

=== Super Netball statistics ===
Statistics are correct to the end of the 2018 season.

Season	Team	G/A	GA	RB	CPR	FD	IC	DF	PN	TO	MP
2017	Lightning	0/0	171	0	276	434	3	4	62	37	15
2018	Lightning	0/0	302	0	383	498	4	1	50	53	15
2019	Magpies	0/0	0	0	0	0	0	0	0	0	0
Career		0/0	473	0	659	932	7	5	112	90	30

== Personal life ==
In addition to her sister Madison Browne, Browne's father Mark was also a sportsperson, playing Australian rules football for Geelong Cats in the 1970s. Browne grew up in Victorian regional city of Geelong and attended Belmont High School. She grew up playing local netball for South Barwon in the Geelong Football Netball League. As of 2022, Browne currently studies a Bachelor of Exercise and Sport Science at Deakin University. She is a singer/songwriter and studied a Bachelor of Arts (Music Performance) at Collarts in Melbourne. During her time at Collingwood, Browne served as Collingwood's delegate to the Australian Netball Players’ Association. She currently works as a commentator for the National Basketball League.
