= Melbourne Vixens =

Australian netball team

- Founded: 2007
- Based in: Melbourne
- Regions: Victoria
- Home venue: John Cain Arena
- Head coach: Di Honey
- Asst coach: Kate Upton
- Captain: Kate Moloney
- Premierships: 4 (2009, 2014, 2020, 2025)
- League: Super Netball; ANZ Championship (2008-2016)
- 2026 placing: 2nd
- Website: melbournevixens.com.au
Playing dress	Alternate

Melbourne Vixens is an Australian professional netball team based in Melbourne, Victoria. Since 2017 they have represented Netball Victoria in Super Netball. Between 2008 and 2016, they played in the ANZ Championship. The team was formed in 2007 when Netball Victoria merged its two former Commonwealth Bank Trophy league teams, Melbourne Phoenix and Melbourne Kestrels. Vixens have won four premierships, in 2009, 2014, 2020, and 2025.

== History ==
=== ANZ Championship ===
Between 2008 and 2016, Vixens played in the ANZ Championship. Vixens were formed in late 2007 when Netball Victoria merged its two former Commonwealth Bank Trophy league teams, Melbourne Phoenix and Melbourne Kestrels, in order to enter a single team in the 2008 ANZ Championship. During the ANZ Championship era, Vixens won two premierships, in 2009 and 2014. In 2009, with a team co-captained by Bianca Chatfield and Sharelle McMahon, Vixens won 12 of their 13 matches during the regular season and finished as minor premiers. Vixens subsequently defeated Waikato Bay of Plenty Magic 58–43 in the major semi-final and Adelaide Thunderbirds 54–46 in the grand final to finish as overall champions.

In 2012, with a team captained by Bianca Chatfield, and featuring Madison Browne, Julie Corletto and Geva Mentor, Vixens finished the season as minor premiers. In the major semi-final they defeated Northern Mystics 56–50. This was the first ever netball match held at Rod Laver Arena. However they lost the grand final 41–38 to Magic and finished the season as runners-up.

In 2014, with a team coached by Simone McKinnis, captained by Bianca Chatfield and also featuring Tegan Caldwell, Geva Mentor, Madison Browne and the veteran Catherine Cox, Vixens won both the minor premiership and the overall championship. Vixens defeated Queensland Firebirds in both the major semi-final and the grand final as they won their second premiership.

Regular season statistics
Season	Position	Won	Drawn	Lost
2008	4th	9	0	4
2009	1st	12	0	1
2010	7th	6	0	7
2011	5th	8	0	5
2012	1st	10	0	3
2013	2nd	9	0	4
2014	1st	9	0	4
2015	5th	7	0	6
2016	4th	8	0	5

Premierships
Runners Up

=== Super Netball ===
Since 2017, Vixens have represented Netball Victoria in Super Netball. With a team coached by Simone McKinnis and captained by Kate Moloney, Vixens finished the inaugural season as minor premiers. However they subsequently lost both the major semi-final and preliminary final during the Finals Series and finished third overall. Four Vixens players—Mwai Kumwenda, Tegan Philip, Liz Watson and Jo Weston—were named in the 2017 Team of the Year.

In 2020, with a team coached again by Simone McKinnis and co-captained by Kate Moloney and Liz Watson, Vixens finished the season as both minor premiers and overall champions. In the Grand Final they defeated West Coast Fever 66–64.

Following its championship win in 2020, the Vixens struggled in 2021, finishing last and claiming the wooden spoon for the first time in club history.

Vixens dominated the 2022 regular season before a shock defeat in the major semi-final by the West Coast Fever forced them to reach the Grand Final by winning the preliminary final, winning against GIANTS Netball 55-54. The club was unable to beat the Fever in the Grand Final, losing 70-59 and walking away runners-up.

Vixens began the 2023 season well, sitting in 2nd position on the ladder after Round 10 with a 7–3 record. They then lost 3 of their next 4 matches to finish the regular season with an 8–6 record, qualifying for the finals series as the 4th seed. They lost the minor semi-final to the West Coast Fever 57-64, eliminating them from the finals.

The Vixens sat inside the top 2 of the Suncorp Super Netball ladder for the majority of the 2024 regular season, spending a few weeks as the number 1 seed before finishing the season with an 11–3 record, in second place. They lost the major semi-final to the Adelaide Thunderbirds by 25 goals, 43–68, in what was the second largest defeat for a team in a major semi-final. Vixens then beat the Fever 73–72 in the preliminary final, advancing to the Grand Final. The club was unable to beat the Thunderbirds in the Grand Final, losing 57–59 and walking away as the runners-up for the second time in three seasons.

The Vixens had a slow start to the 2025 season, sitting in 6th position with a 2–4 record at the conclusion of their Round 6 match against the Sunshine Coast Lightning, where they lost 50-62. After this match, coach Simone McKinnis announced she would be stepping down as coach of the Vixens at the conclusion of the season. When asked how her side could turn their season around, McKinnis famously stated in her post-match press conference that the Vixens needed to "go to the pub". After this remark, the Vixens went on a 6–2 run to finish the season, including a five match winning streak, to qualify for the finals series as the 4th seed, with an 8–6 record. They beat the Thunderbirds 58–56 in Adelaide, breaking a streak of 5 consecutive losses against the Thunderbirds in Adelaide. They then beat the 2nd placed New South Wales Swifts 66–65 in Sydney, erasing a 10 point deficit at three quarter time to advance to the Grand Final at Rod Laver Arena. In the Grand Final, the Vixens defeated the West Coast Fever 59-58, in front of a record crowd of 15,013 spectators. The Vixens claimed their second Suncorp Super Netball premiership and their 4th national league title overall, becoming only the second team to win a SSN premiership from 4th on the ladder.

Regular season statistics
Season	Position	Won	Drawn	Lost
2017	1st	11	1	2
2018	5th	8	0	6
2019	3rd	8	1	5
2020	1st	11	1	2
2021	8th	2	0	12
2022	1st	12	0	2
2023	4th	8	0	6
2024	2nd	11	0	3
2025	4th	8	0	6
2026	2nd	10	0	4

Premierships
Runners Up

== Grand finals ==
ANZ Championship

Season	Winners	Score	Runners up	Venue
2009	Melbourne Vixens	54–46	Adelaide Thunderbirds	Hisense Arena
2012	Waikato Bay of Plenty Magic	41–38	Melbourne Vixens	Hisense Arena
2014	Melbourne Vixens	53–42	Queensland Firebirds	Hisense Arena

Super Netball

Season	Winners	Score	Runners up	Venue
2020	Melbourne Vixens	66–64	West Coast Fever	Nissan Arena
2022	West Coast Fever	70–59	Melbourne Vixens	RAC Arena
2024	Adelaide Thunderbirds	59–57	Melbourne Vixens	Adelaide Entertainment Centre
2025	Melbourne Vixens	59–58	West Coast Fever	Rod Laver Arena
2026	Adelaide Thunderbirds	61-40	Melbourne Vixens	John Cain Arena

== Home venues ==
Since its inception in 2008, the Vixens' main home venue has been John Cain Arena at Melbourne Park.

The club has previously played intermittent home matches at Margaret Court Arena and Rod Laver Arena. Between 2008 and 2011, the club played occasional home games at the State Netball & Hockey Centre in Parkville, which now serves as their administrative home and training venue, shared with the offices of Netball Victoria.

== Notable players ==
=== 2027 squad ===
2027 Melbourne Vixens roster
Players
Coaching staff

Nat.	Name	Position(s)	DoB	Height
(Australia)	Kiera Austin	GA, GS	26 August 1997 (age 29)	1.86 m (6 ft 1 in)
(Australia)	Ashleigh Ervin	GK, GD	15 May 2003 (age 23)	1.92 m (6 ft 4 in)
(Australia)	Sophie Garbin	GS, GA	6 April 1997 (age 29)	1.84 m (6 ft 0 in)
(Australia)	Kate Moloney	C, WD, WA	8 January 1993 (age 33)	1.77 m (5 ft 10 in)
(Australia)	Hannah Mundy	WA, C, WD	10 June 2001 (age 25)	1.81 m (5 ft 11 in)
(New Zealand)	Mila Reuelu-Buchanan	WA, C	11 May 1998 (age 28)	1.72 m (5 ft 8 in)
(New Zealand)	Carys Stythe	GD, GK	18 June 2003 (age 23)	1.92 m (6 ft 4 in)
(New Zealand)	Amelia Walmsley	GS	31 January 2004 (age 22)	1.92 m (6 ft 4 in)
(Australia)	Jo Weston	GD, WD, GK	14 February 1994 (age 32)	1.88 m (6 ft 2 in)
(Australia)	Tayla Williams	C, WD, WA	13 April 2000 (age 26)	1.75 m (5 ft 9 in)

Head coach

- (Australia) Di Honey

Assistant coach

- (Australia) Kate Upton

Notes

- (c) – Captain
- (cc) – Co-captain
- (vc) – Vice-captain
- – Injury / maternity leave
- (TRP) – Temporary Replacement Player
Player profiles: Team website
Last updated: 23 October 2026

=== Internationals ===
Australia

- Kiera Austin
- Kate Beveridge
- Kelsey Browne
- Madison Browne
- Bianca Chatfield
- Natasha Chokljat
- Julie Corletto
- Catherine Cox
- Rudi Ellis
- Ashleigh Ervin
- Demelza Fellowes
- Sophie Garbin
- Renae Hallinan
- Wendy Jones
- Sharni Layton
- Emily Mannix
- Sharelle McMahon
- Kate Moloney
- Caitlyn Nevins
- Tegan Philip
- Caitlin Thwaites
- Chelsey Tregear
- Liz Watson
- Jo Weston

Australia Fast5

- Karyn Bailey
- Johannah Curran
- Carla Dziwoki
- Hannah Mundy
- Amy Steel

England

- Ama Agbeze
- Geva Mentor
- Abby Sargent

Jamaica

- Kadie-Ann Dehaney

Malawi

- Mwai Kumwenda

New Zealand

- Mila Reuelu-Buchanan
- Carys Stythe
- Amelia Walmsley

South Africa

- Ine-Marí Venter

=== Captains ===
Name	Years
Sharelle McMahon	2008–2011 (co-captain)
Bianca Chatfield	2008–2011 (co-captain); 2012-2015 (sole captain)
Madison Robinson	2016
Kate Moloney	2017–2019, 2024-present (sole captain); 2020, 2022–2023 (co-captain)
Liz Watson	2020, 2022–2023 (co-captain)

== Club Award winners ==
Sharelle McMahon Medal

Since 2014, the Vixens' most valuable player of season award has been known as the Sharelle McMahon Medal.

Season	Winner	Runner(s) up
2008	Natasha Chokljat	Bianca Chatfield
2009	Sharelle McMahon	Julie Prendergast; Caitlin Thwaites
2010	Sharelle McMahon (2)	Bianca Chatfield
2011	Bianca Chatfield	Madison Browne
2012	Geva Mentor	Madison Browne
2013	Madison Browne	Geva Mentor
2014	Geva Mentor (2)	Madison Robinson
2015	Geva Mentor (3); Karyn Bailey	Madison Robinson; Tegan Philip
2016	Madison Robinson (2)	Geva Mentor
2017	Liz Watson	Emily Mannix
2018	Liz Watson (2)	Kate Moloney
2019	Emily Mannix	Kate Moloney
2020	Kate Moloney	Jo Weston; Kate Eddy
2021	Kate Moloney (2)	Mwai Kumwenda
2022	Liz Watson (3)	Kate Moloney
2023	Liz Watson (4)	Emily Mannix
2024	Kiera Austin	Kate Moloney
2025	Jo Weston	Kate Moloney
2026	Sophie Garbin	Kate Moloney

Players' Player

A players' player award was introduced in 2026.

Season	Player
2026	Kate Eddy

Elite Behaviours' Award

This award was renamed from the Coaches' Award in 2026.

Season	Player
2008	Caitlin Thwaites
2009	Bianca Chatfield
2010	Bianca Chatfield
2011	Julie Corletto
2012	Chelsey Tregear
2013	Erin Hoare
2014	Kate Moloney
2015	Kate Moloney
2016	Emily Mannix
2017	Khao Watts
2018	Emily Mannix
2019	Renae Ingles
2020	Caitlin Thwaites
2021	Kate Moloney
2022	Ruby Barkmeyer
2023	Kate Eddy
2024	Zara Walters
2025	Tara Watson
2026	Kate Moloney

Player of the Finals

Season	Player
2009	Bianca Chatfield
2012	Madison Browne
2013	Bianca Chatfield
2014	Geva Mentor
2017	Jo Weston
2019	Emily Mannix
2020	Jo Weston
2022	Jo Weston
2024	Kiera Austin
2025	Sophie Garbin
2026	Kate Moloney

Rookie of the Year

Season	Player
2008	not awarded
2009	Chelsey Tregear
2010	Tegan Caldwell
2011	not awarded
2012	Karyn Howarth
2013	not awarded
2014	Liz Watson
2015	Jo Weston
2016	Alice Teague-Neeld
2017	not awarded
2018	Kadie-Ann Dehaney
2019	not awarded
2020	Allie Smith
2021	Hannah Mundy
2022	not awarded
2023	not awarded
2024	Zara Walters
2025	not awarded
2026	not awarded

Excellence in Sport and Life Award

Season	Player
2008	Bianca Chatfield
2009	Renae Hallinan
2010	Natasha Chokljat
2011	Chelsey Tregear
2012	Bianca Chatfield
2013	not awarded
2014	Amy Steel
2015	Bianca Chatfield
2016	Jo Weston
2017	Chloe Watson
2018	not awarded
2019	Renae Ingles
2020	Jo Weston
2021	Allie Smith
2022	Sharni Lambden
2023	Kiera Austin
2024	Jo Weston
2025	Kate Eddy
2026	Zara Walters

== Competition Award winners ==
ANZ Championship MVP

Season	Player
2016	Madison Robinson (joint winner)

ANZ Championship Australian Player of the Year

Season	Player
2012	Madison Browne

Super Netball Rookie of the Year

Season	Player
2017	Liz Watson

ANZ Championship Grand Final MVP

Season	Player
2009	Sharelle McMahon
2014	Tegan Caldwell

Super Netball Grand Final MVP

Season	Player
2020	Mwai Kumwenda
2025	Kiera Austin

ANZ Championship All Star Team

Season	Player	Position
2011	Sharelle McMahon	GA
2012	Madison Browne	WA
2012	Julie Corletto	WD
2012	Geva Mentor	GK
2013	Madison Browne	WA
2013	Geva Mentor	GK
2014	Madison Robinson	WA
2014	Geva Mentor	GK

Super Netball Team of the Year

Season	Player	Position
2017	Mwai Kumwenda	GS
2017	Tegan Philip	GA
2017	Liz Watson	WA
2017	Jo Weston	GD
2018	Liz Watson	WA
2019	Liz Watson	WA
2019	Kate Moloney	C
2019	Renae Ingles	WD
2019	Emily Mannix	GK
2020	Liz Watson	WA
2020	Kate Moloney	C
2022	Liz Watson	WA
2023	Liz Watson	Reserve
2024	Kiera Austin	GA
2024	Kate Moloney	C
2024	Sophie Garbin	Reserve
2025	Kiera Austin	GA

Australian Netball Players' Association (ANPA) Awards

Season	Player	Award
2026	Kiera Austin	Heart of the Game

== Head coaches ==
Coach	Years
Julie Hoornweg	2008–2012
Simone McKinnis	2012–2025
Di Honey	2025–present

ANZ Championship Australian Coach of the Year

Season	Coach
2009	Julie Hoornweg
2012	Julie Hoornweg
2014	Simone McKinnis

Joyce Brown Coach of the Year

Season	Coach
2017	Simone McKinnis
2020	Simone McKinnis
2025	Simone McKinnis

== Vixens Academy ==
The reserve team of the Melbourne Vixens is known as the Vixens Academy, and previously played as the Victorian Fury. This team currently plays in the Super Netball Reserves competition, which began in 2024, after rebranding from the Australian Netball Championships and prior to that, the Australian Netball League. The Vixens Academy/Victorian Fury are the most successful team in the second-tier competition, having won eight premierships, most recently in 2019.

== Premierships ==
- ANZ Championship
  - Winners: 2009, 2014
  - Runners Up: 2012
  - Minor Premierships: 2009, 2012, 2014
- Super Netball
  - Winners: 2020, 2025
  - Runners Up: 2022, 2024, 2026
  - Minor Premierships: 2017, 2020, 2022
- Super Netball Reserves / Australian Netball Championships / Australian Netball League
  - Winners: 2008, 2009, 2010, 2013, 2014, 2015, 2016, 2019
  - Runners Up: 2011, 2017
