= Amy Steel (netball) =

Australian netball player (born 1989)

Personal information
- Born: 7 April 1989 (age 37) East Melbourne, Victoria, Australia
- Occupation: Accountant
- Height: 1.90 m (6 ft 3 in)

Netball career
- Playing positions: GD, GK, WD
| Years | Club team | Apps |
| 2010 | Queensland Firebirds | 10 |
| 2009 | Melbourne Vixens | 1 |
| 2005–07 | Melbourne Kestrels | 5 |
| Years | National team | Caps |
| 2008–? | Australia U21 | |
Medal record
World Netball Series
| Bronze medal – third place | 2011 Liverpool | Fastnet |

Amy Steel (born 7 April 1989) is an Australian retired netball player last played for the Adelaide Thunderbirds in the ANZ Championship. She has also previously played for the Melbourne Kestrels and the Queensland Firebirds. Steel debuted with the Melbourne Vixens in Round 9 of the 2009 ANZ Championship season as a replacement for injured goal keeper Bianca Chatfield. Steel was also selected in the Australian U21 squad for the 2009 World Youth Netball Championships in the Cook Islands. She also competed in the 2010 and 2011 World Netball Series tournaments, both held at the Echo Arena in Liverpool, UK.
