= Chelsey Tregear =

Australian netball player

Personal information
- Full name: Chelsey Tregear (Née: Nash)
- Born: 7 October 1983 (age 43)
- Occupation: Podiatrist
- Height: 1.76 m (5 ft 9 1/2 in)
- Spouse: Heath Tregear (m. 2009)
- Children: 4
- University: La Trobe University

Netball career
- Playing positions: WA, C, GA
Years	Club team	Apps
2002–2003	Melbourne Phoenix	
2004	AIS Canberra Darters	
2005–2007	Melbourne Kestrels	
2008	Victorian Fury	
2009–2012	Melbourne Vixens	
Years	National team	Caps
2004	Australian U 21 team	
2009–2010	Australian Diamonds Squad	
- Updated on 21 September 2018

Chelsey Tregear (also known as Chelsey Nash) is a former Australian netball player in the ANZ Championship, formerly playing for the Melbourne Vixens.

== Career ==
Tregear is a versatile netballer capable of covering WA, C and GA. After co-captaining the Melbourne Kestrels in the Commonwealth Bank Trophy. She missed selection for the inaugural season of the ANZ Championship in 2008. She captained Victorian Fury to success in the Australian Netball League in 2008. It was this form that earned her, as Chelsey Nash, a callup to the Melbourne Vixens squad.

Tregear made her ANZ Championship debut in round one of the 2009 season. At the end of the 2009 season, she was awarded "Rookie of the Year" by the Vixens and was chosen for the Australia national netball team, known as the Diamonds. However she was dropped from the 2010/11 Squad.

Tregear is a qualified Podiatrist with the Moorabbin Foot Centre, although she has changed to playing netball under her husband's surname for the 2011 ANZ Championship Season.
