= Tegan Philip =

Australian netball player

Personal information
- Full name: Tegan Philip (Née: Caldwell)
- Born: 3 September 1988 (age 38) Geelong, Victoria
- Height: 1.75 m (5 ft 9 in)
- Spouse: Joshi Philip (since 22 Feb 2015)
- School: Christian College, Geelong

Netball career
- Playing positions: GA, GS
| Years | Club team | Apps |
| 2008–09 | Victoria Fury | |
| 2010–2020 | Melbourne Vixens | 99 |
- (Correct as of 4 March 2012)
| Years | National team | Caps |
| 2009 | Australia U21 | |
| 2010 | Australia (fastnet) | |
| 2014, 2017 | Australian Netball Diamonds | 12 |
- (Correct as of 4 March 2012)
Medal record
Representing Australia
| Gold medal – first place | 2014 Glasgow | Netball |

Tegan Alyce Philip (née Caldwell; born 3 September 1988) is a retired Australian Netball player, who for her entire professional career played for the Melbourne Vixens in the ANZ Championship and Suncorp Super Netball competitions.

== Netball career ==
During the early stages of her career, Philip was described as the new Sharelle McMahon (the former Diamonds captain) because of her agility in the circle, vertical leap, and accurate eye. Her career began in the seaside town of Anglesea in Victoria for the Bellarine Netball Association when she was coached by her mother and father. She was regularly chosen for most representative teams for the area.

However, it wasn't until she was playing senior netball that she started to get noticed in netball circles. Netball had all but consumed Tegan, playing locally on Saturday and then long trips for extremely late Wednesday night state league, with training in between, there wasn't room for too much else. During her time at the then Hume City Falcons under coach Marg Lind and playing alongside former Australian Netballer, Nicole Richardson is where she made her mark. Pick-up by Victoria, she made an impact at the national competition earning her a position in the Australia U/21 for the 2009 World Youth Championships. An unfortunate injury to the teams starting GA, Tegan was provided with an opportunity. Holding her nerves she was able to help lead Australia to victory against New Zealand in the Cook Islands. A stellar performance in the Grand Final netted her a chance to train with the Melbourne Vixens.

More recently she was part of the successful Commonwealth Games squad that brought home the gold medal from Glasgow 2014. She was selected in the Australian Diamonds squad for the 2018/19 international season. She ended her professional netball career in October 2020, as the most-capped Vixen (131 games), all-time leading goalscorer (2,729 goals) and a participant of the Melbourne Vixens team that won their third premiership.

In 2026 she played for St Joseph’s Football @ Netball Club in Geelong A grade team in the local Geelong Football and Netball League.

== Personal life ==
A devout Christian, she has stated that her faith is crucial to her approach to life. She has been married to Joshi Philip since 22 February 2015.
