= Kate Moloney =

Australian netballer

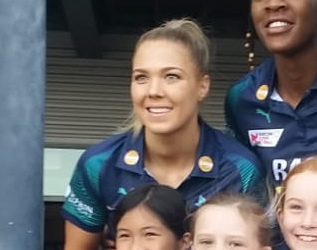
- Moloney in 2019

Personal information
- Full name: Kate Moloney (netball)
- Born: 8 January 1993 (age 33) Australia
- Height: 176 cm (5 ft 9 in)
- School: Catholic Ladies College, Eltham
- University: Australian Catholic University

Netball career
- Playing positions: C, WD, WA
| Years | Club team | Apps |
| 2013–present | Melbourne Vixens | 191 |
- (Correct as of August 31, 2025)
| Years | National team | Caps |
| 2017–present | Australian Diamonds | 58 |
Medal record
Netball
Representing Australia
Commonwealth Games
| Gold medal – first place | 2022 Birmingham | Netball |

Kate Moloney is an Australian netballer who plays for the Melbourne Vixens in the Suncorp Super Netball league. As of April 2017, she is the captain of the Vixens. Moloney made her domestic league netball debut for the Vixens in 2013 and was appointed captain of the team four years later. She made her debut for the Australian national netball team in 2017, going on to be selected in the Australian Diamonds squad for the 2018/19 international season. Kate has represented her country on 51 occasions.

She also captained the 2017 Australian Fast5 team in Melbourne.

== Early life ==
Moloney grew up in the Melbourne suburb of Diamond Creek. She was educated at Sacred Heart Primary School in Diamond Creek, before attending secondary school at Catholic Ladies College in Eltham. She played junior netball for Sacred Heart Netball Club in the Nillumbik Force Netball Association.

== Netball Career Facts ==
- 2013 Melbourne Vixens debut
- 2014 Melbourne Vixens Premiership
- 2014 Melbourne Vixens Coaches Award
- 2015 Melbourne Vixens Coaches Award
- 2017 Melbourne Vixens Captain (2017–present)
- 2017 Samsung Australian Diamonds debut
- 2017 Australian Fast5 Captain
- 2019 Super Netball Team of the Year recipient
- 2020 Melbourne Vixens Premiership
- 2020 Sharelle McMahon medalist
- 2020 Super Netball Team of the Year recipient
- 2021 Melbourne Vixens Coaches Award
- 2021 Sharelle McMahon medalist
- 2022 Commonwealth Games Gold medalist
- 2024 Super Netball Team of the Year recipient
- 2025 Melbourne Vixens Premiership
- 2025 Australian Diamonds Vice Captain (2025-present)
- 2025 Australian International Player of the Year
- 2026 Commonwealth Games Bronze medalist
