= Madison Browne =

Australian netball player (born 1988)

Personal information
- Full name: Madison Browne
- Born: 5 January 1988 (age 38)
- Height: 168 cm (5 ft 6 in)
- Relative: Kelsey Browne
- School: Belmont High School (Victoria)

Netball career
- Playing positions: WA, C
Years	Club team	Apps
2006–07	Melbourne Kestrels	24
2008, 2011–16	Melbourne Vixens	106
2009–10	West Coast Fever	26
2017–2020	Collingwood Magpies	22
Years	National team	Caps
2009–2018	Australia	61
Medal record
Representing Australia
Gold medal – first place	2014 Glasgow	Netball
Silver medal – second place	2018 Gold Coast	Netball
- Updated on 2009-03-12

Madison "Madi" Browne (born 5 January 1988) is an Australian netball player who has been one of the most successful Australian Netball players.

== Early life ==
Browne played for South Barwon Football and Netball Club when she was younger. Her sister Kelsey also played in A grade for South Barwon before joining Madison at the Magpies Netball in the Suncorp Super Netball league. Their father Mark played Australian rules football for Geelong in the 1970s.

== Domestic career ==
Browne made her domestic league debut in the Commonwealth Bank Trophy in 2006, playing with the Melbourne Kestrels, before being signed by the Melbourne Vixens in 2008 to play in the ANZ Championship. She transferred to the West Coast Fever ahead of the 2009 season before rejoining the Vixens in 2011. Browne was awarded Most Valued Player at both the Fever and Vixens on two occasions. In 2012 Browne achieved an historic feat; sweeping clean all of netball Australia’s most highly regarded awards. Beginning with the ANZ Championship Player of the Year, followed by International Player of the Year and making her the clear winner of the Liz Ellis Diamond award.

In 2014, she helped the Melbourne Vixens claim their second ANZ Championship title after they defeated the Queensland Firebirds in the Grand Final. She topped the 2014 season off with making the Championship All Star Team at Wing Attack once again, as she had also held this position in 2013. The 2014 season saw Browne once again achieve something no Australian netballer has done, she became the first athlete to win the Liz Ellis Diamond award twice.

In the 2015 ANZ Championship season, Browne suffered an ACL tear during the final quarter of the Vixens Round 6 match against Fever.

During her comeback season in 2016 she was named captain of the Vixens. The classy style of game saw her come back to the court without missing a beat and she was awarded the ANZ Championship Australia Conference MVP in the 2016 season.

In 2017, Browne made the move to the new Melbourne-based club the Collingwood Magpies and became the inaugural captain of the team, a position she holds to this day. Browne was an integral player for the Magpies in their first two seasons, though she missed the entire 2019 season after undergoing surgery to repair her anterior cruciate ligament. She returned to the court in 2020 though played only some matches due to further injury concerns. She announced her departure from the club and league in September 2020. She left Australian netball with two Liz Elliz Diamonds and two International Player of the Years awards, prompting her outgoing coach Rob Wright to label her the "finest midcourter" in Australian netball history.

Browne came out of retirement shortly thereafter, announcing in November 2020 that she had signed with Leeds Rhinos Netball ahead of 2021 British season, in doing so becoming one of the Superleague's highest-ever profile signings.

=== Super Netball statistics ===
Statistics are correct to the end of the 2018 season.

Season	Team	G/A	GA	RB	CPR	FD	IC	DF	PN	TO	MP
2017	Magpies	0/0	271	0	313	560	6	10	73	39	15
2018	Magpies	0/0	316	0	357	499	3	6	69	48	14
2019	Magpies	0/0	0	0	0	0	0	0	0	0	0
Career		0/0	587	0	670	1059	9	16	142	87	29

== International career ==
Browne was included in the Australian national squad in 2007 after the World Championships in November. In 2010, Browne was selected to be part of the Diamonds squad during the England tour, replacing Lauren Nourse due to commitments. In one of the matches, Browne was awarded player of the match.

Browne was also part of the 15 player squad, but did not make the final 12 player squad. Despite being the shortest player on the squad at 168 cm, Browne is one of the fastest players in the squad as vice-captain. In the year 2012 Browne was awarded Australian International Player of the Year.

Later that year she was named in the Australian Netball Diamonds to compete in the 2014 Commonwealth Games who went on to win Gold. In 2017 Browne captained the Diamonds. She re-appeared for Australia in the 2018 Commonwealth Games, where she was part of the team that won the Silver medal. She announced her retirement from international netball in July 2018.

== Awards and achievements ==
- 61 test caps for the Australian Diamonds
- 2 x Liz Ellis Diamond (2012, 2014)
- Australian International Player of the Year (2012, 2014)
- Best New Talent and Rookie of the Year (2006)
- Australian U/21 Player of the Year (2008)
- U/21 World Championships (2009)
- West Coast Fever MVP (2009, 2010)
- Constellation Cup Titles (2011, 2013, 2014, 2016)
- ANZ Championship Player of the Year (2012)
- Melbourne Vixens MVP (2013, 2016)
- ANZ Championship All Star Wing Attack (2013, 2014)
- Commonwealth Games Gold Medal (2014)
- Melbourne Vixen Premiership (2014)
- ANZ Championship MVP (2016)
- Commonwealth Games Silver Medal (2018)
