= Caitlin Thwaites =

Australian netball player and volleyballer

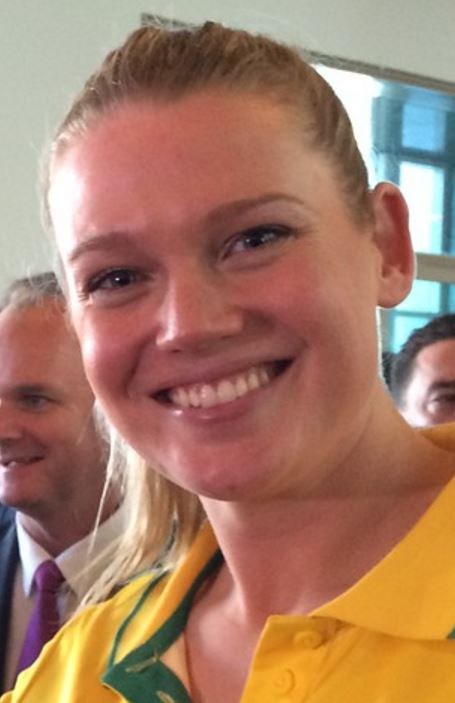
- Thwaites in 2015

Personal information
- Full name: Caitlin Thwaites
- Born: 29 December 1986 (age 39)
- Height: 188 cm (6 ft 2 in)
- School: Girton Grammar School

Netball career
- Playing positions: GS, GA
Years	Club team	Apps
2002, 2004–2007	Melbourne Kestrels	
2008–2010	Melbourne Vixens	
2011–2013	Central Pulse	
2014–2016	New South Wales Swifts	
2017–2018	Collingwood Magpies	
2019– 2020	Melbourne Vixens	
Years	National team	Caps
2012–2019	Australia	55
Medal record
Representing Australia
Netball World Championships
Gold medal – first place	2015 Australia	Netball
Silver medal – second place	2019 Liverpool	Netball
Commonwealth Games
Gold medal – first place	2014 Glasgow	Netball
Silver medal – second place	2018 Gold Coast	Netball
- Updated on 1 November 2019

Caitlin Thwaites (born 29 December 1986) is a former Australian netball player and volleyballer.

== Career ==
Caitlin Thwaites was born in Bendigo, Australia. Thwaites began her career at for the Melbourne Kestrels of the Commonwealth Bank Trophy at the age of 16. However, once the ANZ Championship was founded in 2008 she moved to the Melbourne Vixens. Thwaites played for the Vixens from 2008 to 2010 and was part of the 2009 premiership team which defeated the Adelaide Thunderbirds. In 2011 she joined New Zealand–based ANZ Championship side the Central Pulse. In 2012 Thwaites made her international debut for the Australian Diamonds. Thwaites performed a vital role for the Pulse, scoring 431 goals for an accuracy percentage 81.3 per cent in the 2011 season. Thwaites later became the only New Zealand–based player to be picked for the Australia national team. She returned to Australia to play her domestic league netball in 2014 with the New South Wales Swifts and won the club's MVP award in 2015.

Thwaites began playing for the Collingwood Magpies in the Suncorp Super Netball competition from 2017, where she won the league's leading goalscorer award, scoring 594 goals in the regular season. She was awarded the Magpies' best and fairest for her efforts that year. On 5 September 2018, after not being offered another contract at the Magpies, Thwaites announced she would be signing with the Melbourne Vixens for the 2019 season.

Thwaites has won gold medals representing Australia at the 2014 Commonwealth Games and the 2015 Netball World Cup, as well as a silver medal at the 2018 Commonwealth Games. She was selected in the Australian Diamonds squad for the 2018/19 international season and featured in the Diamonds’ 2019 Netball World Cup squad. She announced her retirement from international netball in October 2019, finishing with 55 caps for the national team. Thwaites was part of the Melbourne Vixens premiership team that won the 2020 Grand Final; she announced her retirement from netball after this match.

== Volleyball ==
Thwaites has also represented Australia in women's volleyball, most notably at the 2004 Olympics qualifications.

== Netball career facts ==
Sources:

- Commonwealth Games Gold Medallist in 2014
- Commonwealth Games Silver Medallist in 2018
- ANZ Championship winner in 2009 (Vixens)
- Member of the Diamonds’ World Cup winning squad in 2015
- Diamonds debut in 2012
- NSW Swifts MVP 2015
- Central Pulse MVP 2011
- Magpies Netball 2017 Best and Fairest
- Magpies Netball 2017 Players' Player
- Magpies Netball vice-captain 2018
