= Sharelle McMahon =

Australian netball player

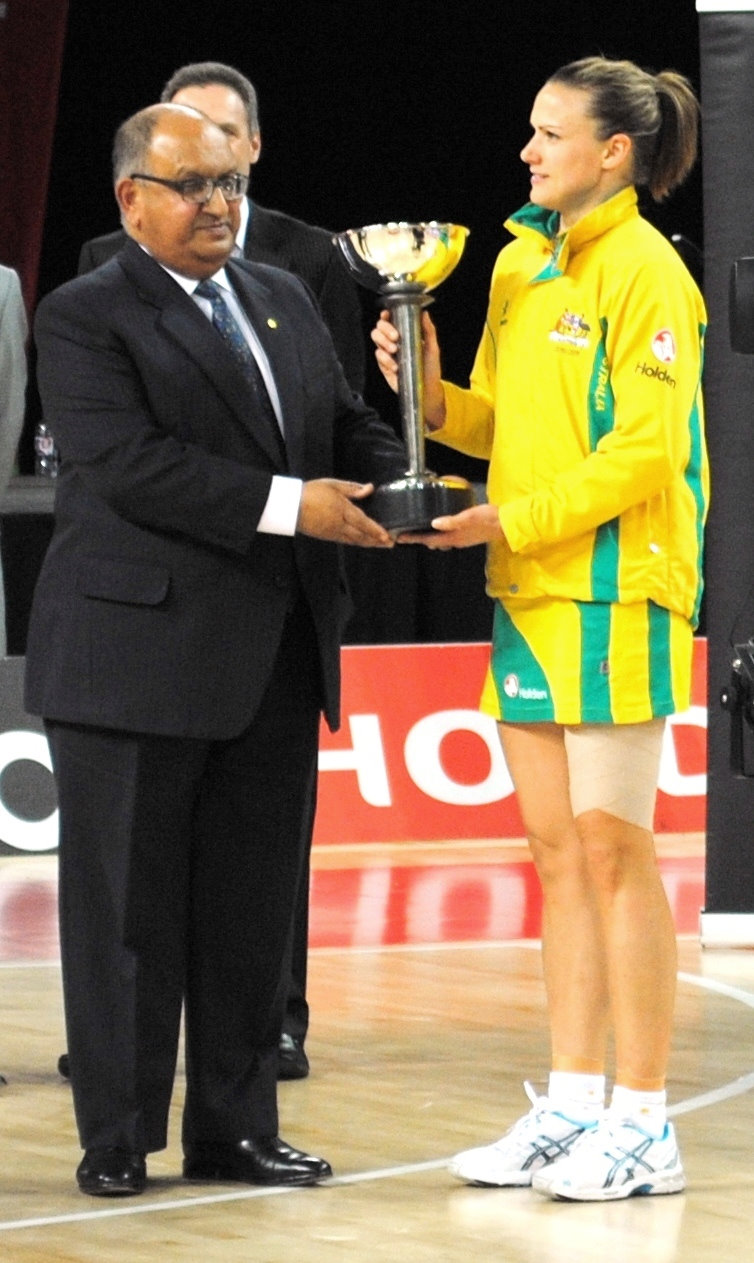
- McMahon being presented with the Constellation Cup by Sir Anand Satyanand

Personal information
- Full name: Sharelle Jane McMahon
- Born: 12 August 1977 (age 49) Bamawm, VIC, Australia
- Height: 177 cm (5 ft 9 1/2 in)
- Spouse: Brek Mansfield (m. 2005)
- Children: 2
- School: Rochester Secondary College; Wesley College, Melbourne

Netball career
- Playing positions: GA, GS
Years	Club team	Apps
1997–2012	Melbourne Phoenix	169
Years	National team	Caps
1998–2011	Australia	118
Medal record
Representing Australia
Netball World Championships
Gold medal – first place	1999 Christchurch	Netball
Silver medal – second place	2003 Kingston	Netball
Gold medal – first place	2007 Auckland	Netball
Commonwealth Games
Gold medal – first place	1998 Kuala Lumpur	Netball
Gold medal – first place	2002 Manchester	Netball
Silver medal – second place	2006 Melbourne	Netball
Silver medal – second place	2010 Delhi	Netball
- Updated on 4 February 2012

Sharelle Jane McMahon (born 12 August 1977) is an Australian former netball player who captained the Australia national netball team. She played in the goal attack and goal shooter positions.

== Domestic career ==
Born in Bamawm, Victoria, McMahon captained the Melbourne Vixens in the ANZ Championship and played 11 seasons for the Melbourne Phoenix (as a captain for four seasons) in the previous Commonwealth Bank Trophy. She led the Vixens to the ANZ Championship title in 2009, defeating the Adelaide Thunderbirds in the grand final.

McMahon captained the Vixens from its inaugural season in 2008 until 2011, sharing the captaincy with Bianca Chatfield from 2009. McMahon was best and fairest for the Vixens in 2009 and 2010, having previously been voted best and fairest for Melbourne Phoenix four times between 2000 and 2007.

On 31 March 2011, McMahon ruptured her Achilles tendon in an ANZ Championship game against Queensland Firebirds. Following surgery, she withdrew from the 2011 Netball World Championships in Singapore, and was considering her playing future. Australian coach Norma Plummer described McMahon as "probably the most athletic player of natural talent" to have played the game.

McMahon confirmed during the off season that she would be returning to the Melbourne Vixens in the 2012 ANZ Championship. But after playing one pre season match McMahon announced that she was pregnant and withdrew from the Vixens team for the 2012 season. Her son Xavier was born on 30 August 2012 and her daughter Ruby was born on 27 November 2015.

On 25 October 2012 it was announced that McMahon would return to the Melbourne Vixens for the 2013 season. McMahon officially retired at the end of the 2013 season. At the end of each season, the Melbourne Vixens' most valuable player is awarded the Sharelle McMahon Medal.

In 2017 McMahon joined the match review panel of the AFL Women's football league in its inaugural year.

== International career ==
McMahon's international career began when she was selected in the Australian Under 21 team in 1996 following her performances in the Victorian Under 21 team. In 1997, she made her début for the Australia national netball team against the Jamaica in Jamaica. She was the youngest member of the Australian team which won the netball gold medal at the 1998 Commonwealth Games in Kuala Lumpur.

In September 2009, McMahon made her 100th appearance for the national side, captaining Australia to a 36–33 win against New Zealand. McMahon captained the Australian team at the 2010 Commonwealth Games in Delhi and was selected as the Australian flagbearer for the opening ceremony.

In 2010 McMahon won the Australia's Favourite Diamond award.

Late in 2011, McMahon considered her 2012 future in the Australian Diamonds. I had some thoughts of how it would be nice to finish my career and it definitely didn't involve being carried off the court with a snapped Achilles, McMahon said. There's a lot that has to happen before I do make it back in the team, she said. They've won a world championship without me so I'm certainly not expecting to walk straight back in.

In October 2016, she was inducted as an Athlete Member of the Sport Australia Hall of Fame.
