= Renae Ingles =

Australian netballer (born 1986)

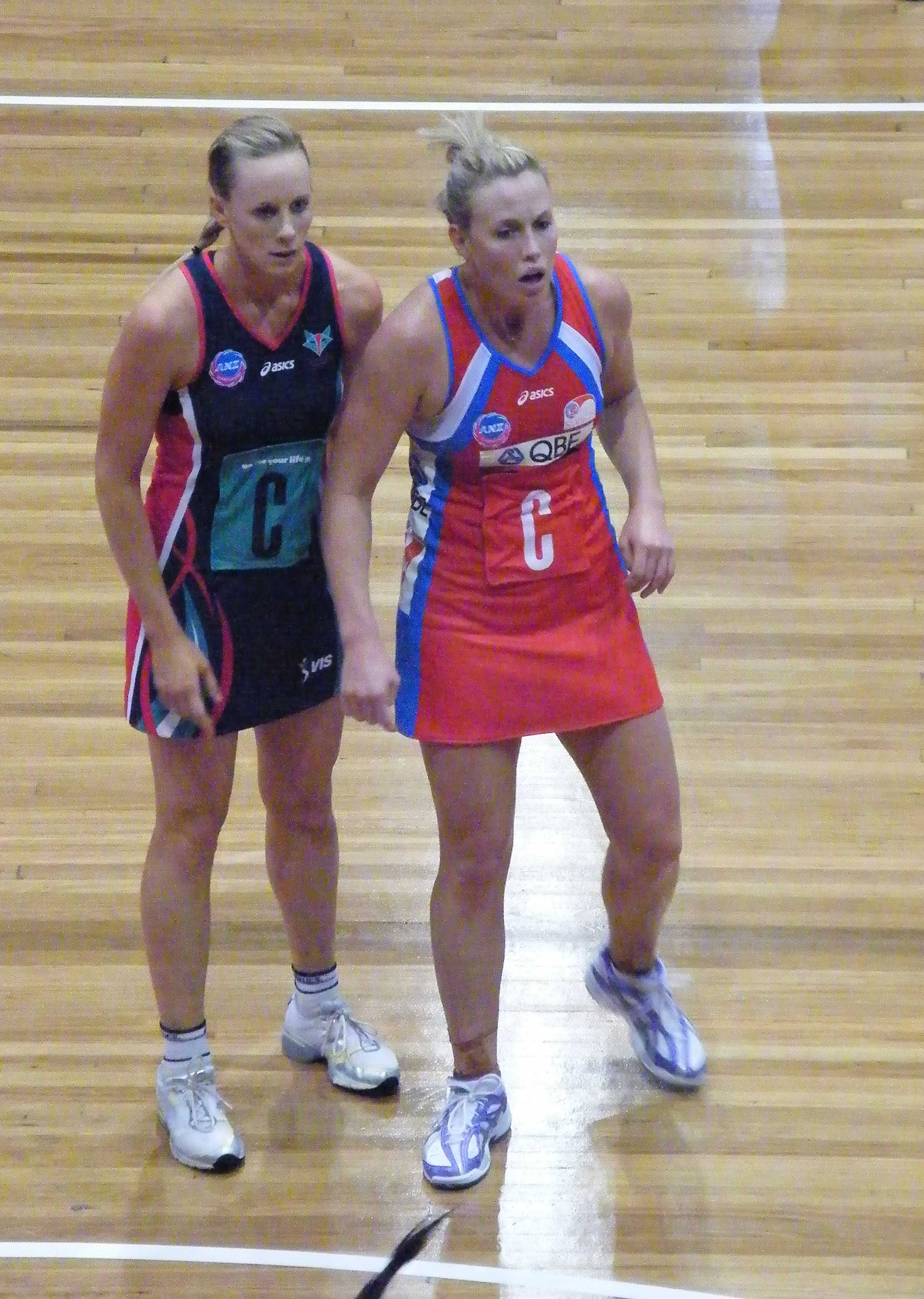
- 7 March 2009; Renae Ingles (left), playing for Melbourne Vixens during the 2009 SOPA Cup, with Kimberlee Green of New South Wales Swifts .

Personal information
- Full name: Renae Ingles (Née: Hallinan)
- Born: 18 July 1986 (age 39) Melbourne, Australia
- Height: 178 cm (5 ft 10 in)
- Spouse: Joe Ingles (m. 2015)
- Children: 3
- School: Mater Christi College; Carey Baptist Grammar School
- University: La Trobe University

Netball career
- Playing positions: WD, C
| Years | Club team | Apps |
| 2003–2007 | Melbourne Phoenix | 43 |
| 2012–2016 | Adelaide Thunderbirds | 53 |
| 2008–2011, 2018–2019 | Melbourne Vixens | |
| Years | National team | Caps |
| 2006–07 | Australian Under 21 | |
| 2009–2017 | Australian Netball Diamonds | 57 |
Medal record
Representing Australia
World Netball Series
| Bronze medal – third place | 2009 Manchester | Fastnet |
Commonwealth Games
| Gold medal – first place | 2014 Glasgow | Netball |
| Silver medal – second place | 2010 Delhi | Netball |
Netball World Championships
| Gold medal – first place | 2015 Australia | Netball |
- Updated on 1 May 2010

Renae Ingles (née Hallinan) (born 18 July 1986) is a former Australia netball international who played in 67 tests for Australia.

== Career ==
Ingles was primarily a wing-defence and centre player. She started her career with the Melbourne Phoenix and played with them for five seasons in the Commonwealth Bank Trophy, before joining the Melbourne Vixens in 2008 in the new ANZ Championships. In 2009, she was an integral member of the Melbourne Vixens lineup that won the Vixens' first ANZ Championship title. She moved to the Adelaide Thunderbirds for the 2012 and 2013 season. She stayed with the Thunderbirds until announcing her retirement in 2017. She returned to netball mid-way through the following year for Melbourne Vixens and was later selected in the Australian Diamonds squad for the 2018/19 international season. Ingles announced her retirement from netball at the end of the 2019 season.

Ingles was awarded Netball Australia's Australian International Player of the Year in 2009. She was selected in the Australian Diamonds squad for the 2018/19 international season.

== Major achievements ==
- Australian Diamonds Commonwealth Games Team 2014 (Gold Medalists)
- Liz Ellis Diamond Winner 2013
- Australian Diamonds International Player of the Year 2013
- Tanya Denver Award 2013
- Adelaide Thunderbirds Premiership 2013
- Australian 2010 Commonwealth Games Team (Silver medalists)
- Australian Diamonds International Player of the Year 2009
- Melbourne Vixens Premiership 2009
- Vixens Excellence in Life & Sport Award 2009
- Vixens Coaches' Award 2009

== Personal life ==
In August 2014 she announced via Twitter that she would be marrying basketballer Joe Ingles. On 29 August 2015 the couple wed at Bird in Hand Winery in Adelaide. In January 2016, Ingles announced she would not play in the 2016 season as she was pregnant. She subsequently gave birth to twins. In May 2020, Ingles announced on Instagram she was expecting the couple's third child, and the child was born later in the year.
