= List of Australia international netball players =

Australia netball internationals

The following is a list notable Australian netball international players who have represented the national team in international tournaments such as the Commonwealth Games, the Netball World Cup, the World Games, the Constellation Cup, the Netball Quad Series and in other senior test matches.

== Current squad ==
Australia roster
Players
Coaches

Name	Pos	DOB	Height	Club	Nat	Caps
Sunday Aryang	GD	25 December 2000 (aged 24)	1.82 m (6 ft 0 in)	West Coast Fever
Kiera Austin	GS, GA, WA	26 August 1997 (aged 28)	1.85 m (6 ft 1 in)	Melbourne Vixens
Courtney Bruce	GK, GD	8 December 1993 (aged 31)	1.89 m (6 ft 2 in)	Sunshine Coast Lightning
Sophie Dwyer	GA	5 December 2001 (aged 23)	1.83 m (6 ft 0 in)	Giants Netball
Ashleigh Ervin	GK, GD	15 May 2003 (aged 22)	1.92 m (6 ft 4 in)	Sunshine Coast Lightning
Sophie Garbin	GS, GA	6 April 1997 (aged 28)	1.84 m (6 ft 0 in)	Melbourne Vixens
Matilda Garrett	GK, GD	11 August 1998 (aged 27)	1.85 m (6 ft 1 in)	Adelaide Thunderbirds
Georgie Horjus	GA, WA	28 January 2002 (aged 23)	1.72 m (5 ft 8 in)	Adelaide Thunderbirds
Sarah Klau	GK, GD	30 September 1994 (aged 31)	1.90 m (6 ft 3 in)	New South Wales Swifts
Cara Koenen	GS, GA	27 February 1996 (aged 29)	1.90 m (6 ft 3 in)	Sunshine Coast Lightning
Kate Moloney (vc)	WD, C, WA	8 January 1993 (aged 32)	1.77 m (5 ft 10 in)	Melbourne Vixens
Hannah Mundy	C, WA, WD	10 June 2001 (aged 24)	1.81 m (5 ft 11 in)	Melbourne Vixens
Amy Parmenter	WD	1 August 1997 (aged 28)	1.76 m (5 ft 9 in)	Melbourne Mavericks
Jamie-Lee Price	WD, C	10 January 1996 (aged 29)	1.79 m (5 ft 10 in)	Melbourne Mavericks
Liz Watson (c)	WA, C	30 March 1994 (aged 30)	1.78 m (5 ft 10 in)	Sunshine Coast Lightning

Head coach

- Stacey Marinkovich

Notes

- (c) – Captain
- (cc) – Co-captain
- (vc) – Vice-captain
- – Injury / maternity leave
- (TRP) – Temporary Replacement Player

== Top 20 Most-capped Internationals ==
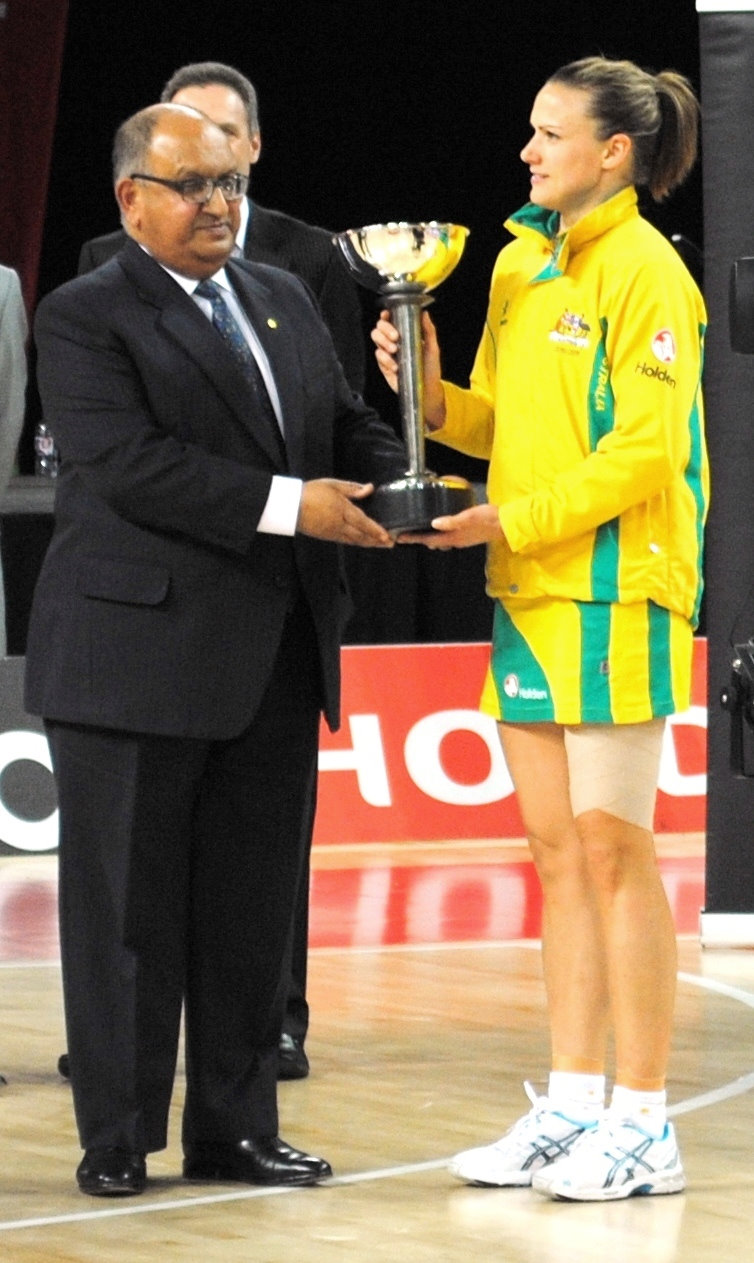
Sharelle McMahon, 1998–2011, 118 caps, 2002 and 2003 Australian International Player of the Year.

	Player	Appearances	State	Years Active
1	Liz Ellis	122	New South Wales	1993–2007
2	Sharelle McMahon	118	Victoria	1998–2011
3	Liz Watson	110	Victoria	2016-
4	Catherine Cox	108	New South Wales	1997–2013
5	Vicki Wilson	104	Queensland	1985–1999
6	Caitlin Bassett	102	Western Australia	2008–2021
7	Courtney Bruce	102	Western Australia	2017–
8	Kathryn Harby-Williams	94	South Australia	1990 –2003
9	Carissa Dalwood	91	New South Wales	1989-1999
10	Jo Weston	88	Victoria	2015–
11	Natalie Medhurst	86	South Australia	2007-2020
12	Michelle den Dekker	84	South Australia	1985-1995
13	Shelley O'Donnell	80	Victoria	1990–1999
14	Natalie von Bertouch	76	South Australia	2004–2013
15	Kimberlee Green	74	New South Wales	2008–2015
16	Laura Geitz	71	Queensland	2008–2018
17	Susan Pettitt	71	New South Wales	2006–2018
18	Jenny Borlase	70	South Australia	1989–1999
19	Mo'onia Gerrard	68	New South Wales	2004–2013
20	Simone McKinnis	63	Victoria	1986–1998

== Sport Australia Hall of Fame ==
=== Individuals ===
The following Australian netball international players have been inducted into the Sport Australia Hall of Fame.

Inducted	Players	Caps	State	Years
1985	Margaret Caldow	27	Victoria	1963–1979
1986	Jean Cowan	3	Victoria	1938–1948
1987 (Note: Elevated to Legend status in 2015)	Anne Sargeant	52	New South Wales	1978–1988
1989	Joyce Brown	9	Victoria	1963
1995	Eunice Gill	?	Victoria	1948
2004	Vicki Wilson	104	Queensland	1985–1999
2009	Liz Ellis	122	New South Wales	1993–2007
2016	Sharelle McMahon	118	Victoria	1998–2011
2020	Michelle den Dekker	84	South Australia	1985–1995
2020	Jill McIntosh	29	Western Australia	1981–1986
2022	Catherine Cox	108	New South Wales	1997–2013
2025	Laura Geitz	71	Queensland	2008–2018

=== Team Sport Australia Award ===
Three World Netball Championships winning Australia national netball teams have been inducted into the Sport Australia Hall of Fame.

==== 1963 World Champions ====
The following Australian netball internationals were members of the squad that won the 1963 World Netball Tournament. In 2005 they were also inducted into the Sport Australia Hall of Fame.

Player	Caps	State	Years
Joyce Brown	9	Victoria	1963
Margaret Caldow	27	Victoria	1963–1979
Valerie Eaton Goff	4	Western Australia	1963
Corin Fleming	8	Western Australia	1963
Annette Foley Simper	12	Western Australia	1960–1971
Ingrid Tough Huisken	8	Western Australia	1963
Jeanette McIver	8	Victoria	1963
June Noseda	9	Victoria	1963
Wilma Ritchie	7	Victoria	1963
Madeline Wilson	8	South Australia	1960–1963

==== 1991 World Champions ====
The following Australian netball internationals were members of the squad that won the 1991 World Netball Championships. In 1992 all the players and their head coach, Joyce Brown, were awarded the Medal of the Order of Australia. In 2012 they were also inducted into the Sport Australia Hall of Fame.

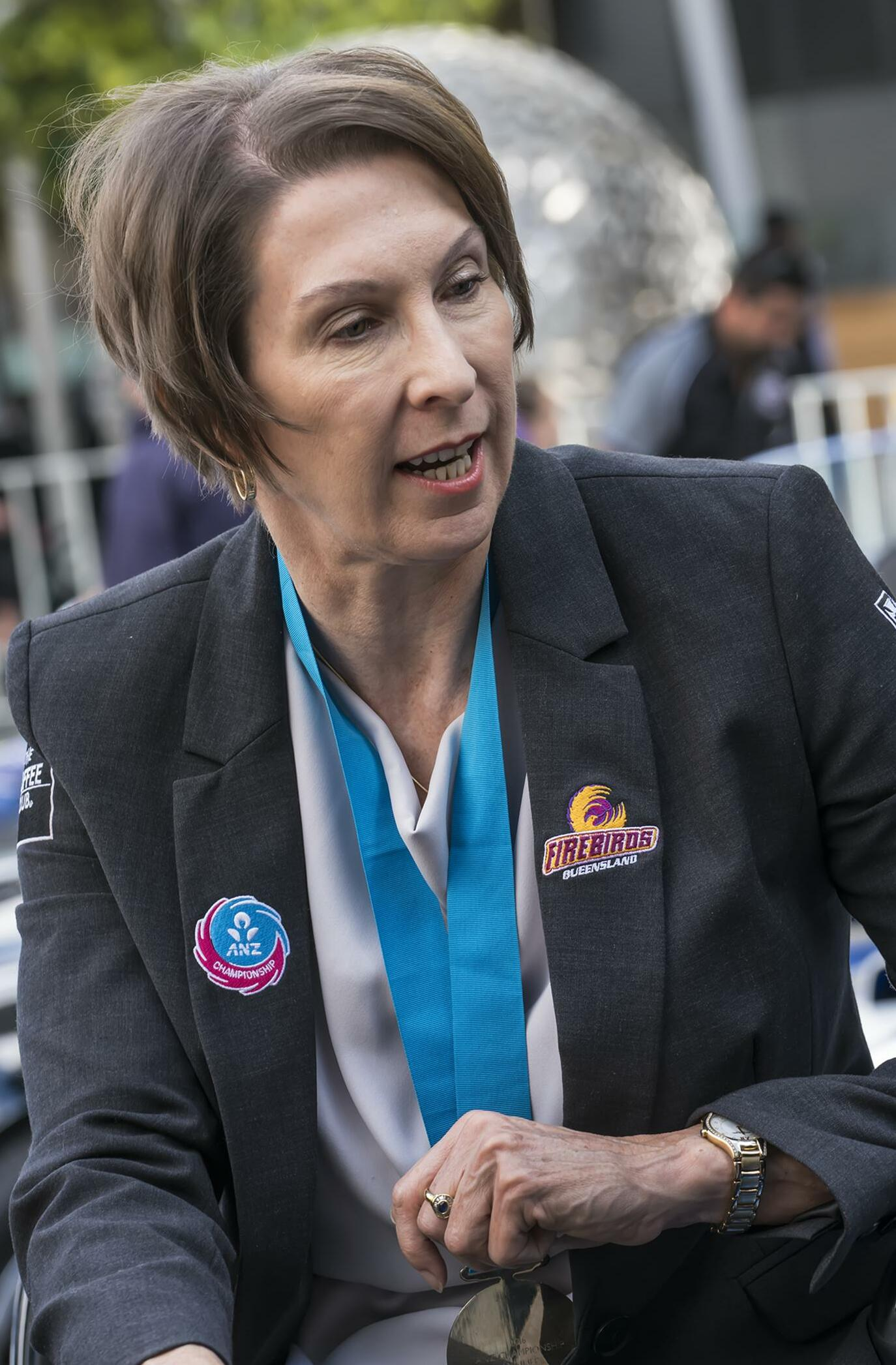
Roselee Jencke OAM, a member of the Australia team that won the gold medal at the 1991 World Netball Championships

Player	Caps	State	Years
Carissa Dalwood	91	New South Wales	1989–1999
Keeley Devery-Cox	63	New South Wales	1985–1993
Michelle den Dekker	84	South Australia	1985–1995
Sharon Finnan	20	New South Wales	1990-2000
Roselee Jencke	43	Victoria	1985–1992
Jenny Borlase	70	South Australia	1989–1999
Sue Kenny	62	New South Wales	1986–1994
Simone McKinnis	63	Victoria	1986–1998
Shelley O'Donnell	80	Victoria	1990–1999
Catriona Wagg	42	New South Wales	1990–1998
Vicki Wilson	104	Queensland	1985–1999
Joyce Brown	9	Victoria	1963

==== 1999 World Champions ====
The following Australian netball internationals were members of the squad that won the 1999 World Netball Championships. In 2014 they were also inducted into the Sport Australia Hall of Fame.

Player	Caps	State	Years
Jenny Borlase	70	South Australia	1989–1999
Carissa Dalwood	91	New South Wales	1989–1999
Jacqui Delaney	21	South Australia	1997–2002
Liz Ellis	122	New South Wales	1993–2007
Sharon Finnan	20	New South Wales	1990-2000
Kathryn Harby-Williams	94	South Australia	1990 –2003
Janine Ilitch	51	Victoria	1995–2006
Sharelle McMahon	118	Victoria	1998–2011
Shelley O'Donnell	80	Victoria	1990–1999
Rebecca Sanders	?	South Australia	1998–20??
Peta Squire	54	South Australia	1999–2004
Vicki Wilson	104	Queensland	1985–1999
Jill McIntosh	29	Western Australia	1981–1986

== Australian Netball Awards ==
=== Liz Ellis Diamond ===
In 2008 Netball Australia introduced the Liz Ellis Diamond award in honour of Liz Ellis. It was awarded to the best performing Australian international, based on their performances with both the national team and in the ANZ Championship. Since 2017, it has been awarded to Suncorp Super Netball players.

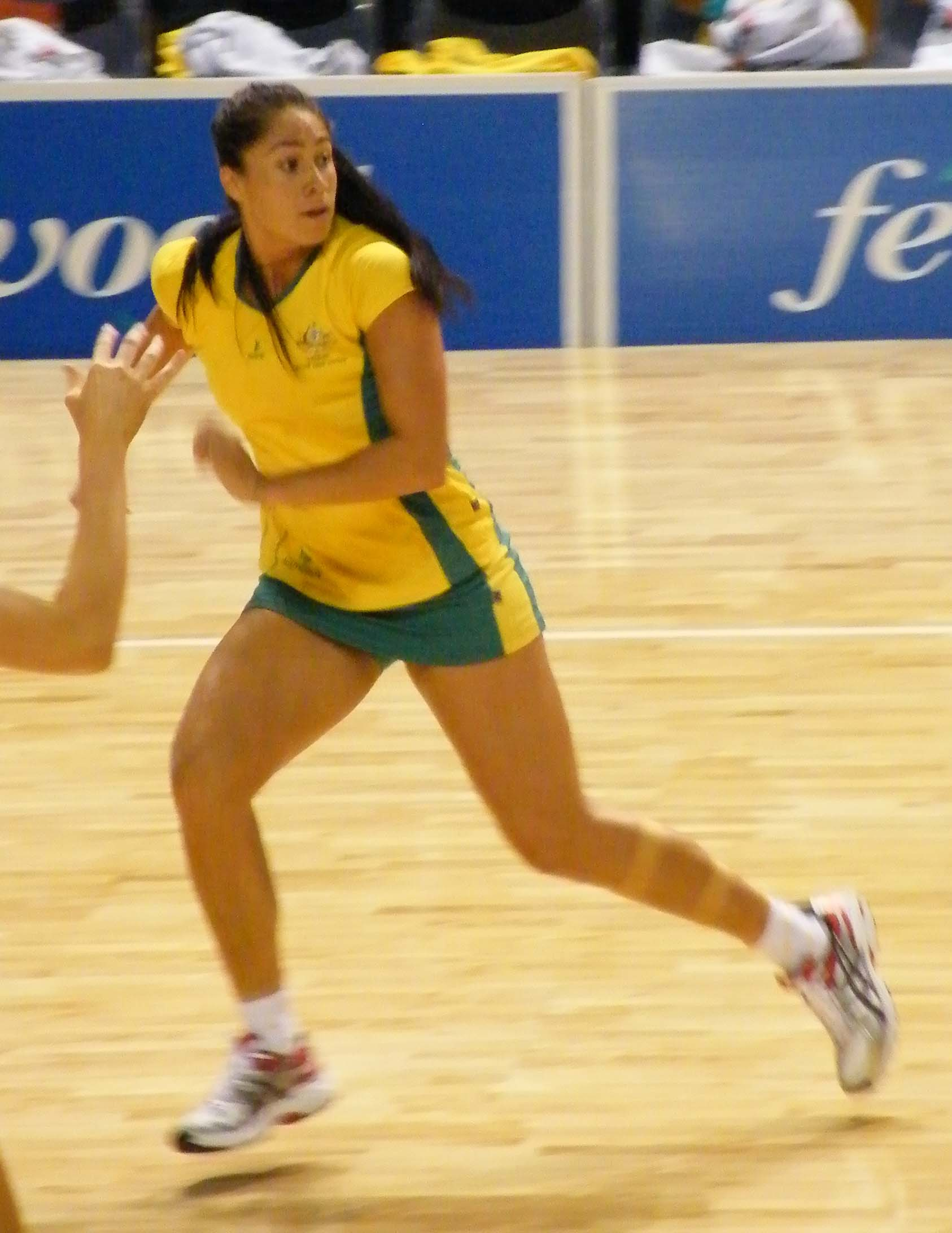
8 October 2008; Mo'onia Gerrard, the inaugural winner of the Liz Ellis Diamond playing for Australia.

Season	Winner	Team
2008	Mo'onia Gerrard	Adelaide Thunderbirds
2009	Julie Corletto	Melbourne Vixens
2010	Natalie von Bertouch	Adelaide Thunderbirds
2011	Laura Geitz	Queensland Firebirds
2012	Madison Browne	Melbourne Vixens
2013	Renae Hallinan	Adelaide Thunderbirds
2014	Madison Robinson (2)	Melbourne Vixens
2015	Caitlin Bassett	West Coast Fever
2017	Gabi Simpson	Queensland Firebirds
2018	Liz Watson	Melbourne Vixens
2019	Gretel Bueta	Queensland Firebirds
2021	Courtney Bruce	West Coast Fever
2022	Liz Watson (2)	Melbourne Vixens
2023	Courtney Bruce (2)	West Coast Fever
2024	Sophie Garbin	Melbourne Vixens
2025	Jamie-Lee Price	GIANTS Netball
2026	Georgie Horjus	Adelaide Thunderbirds

=== Australian International Player of the Year ===
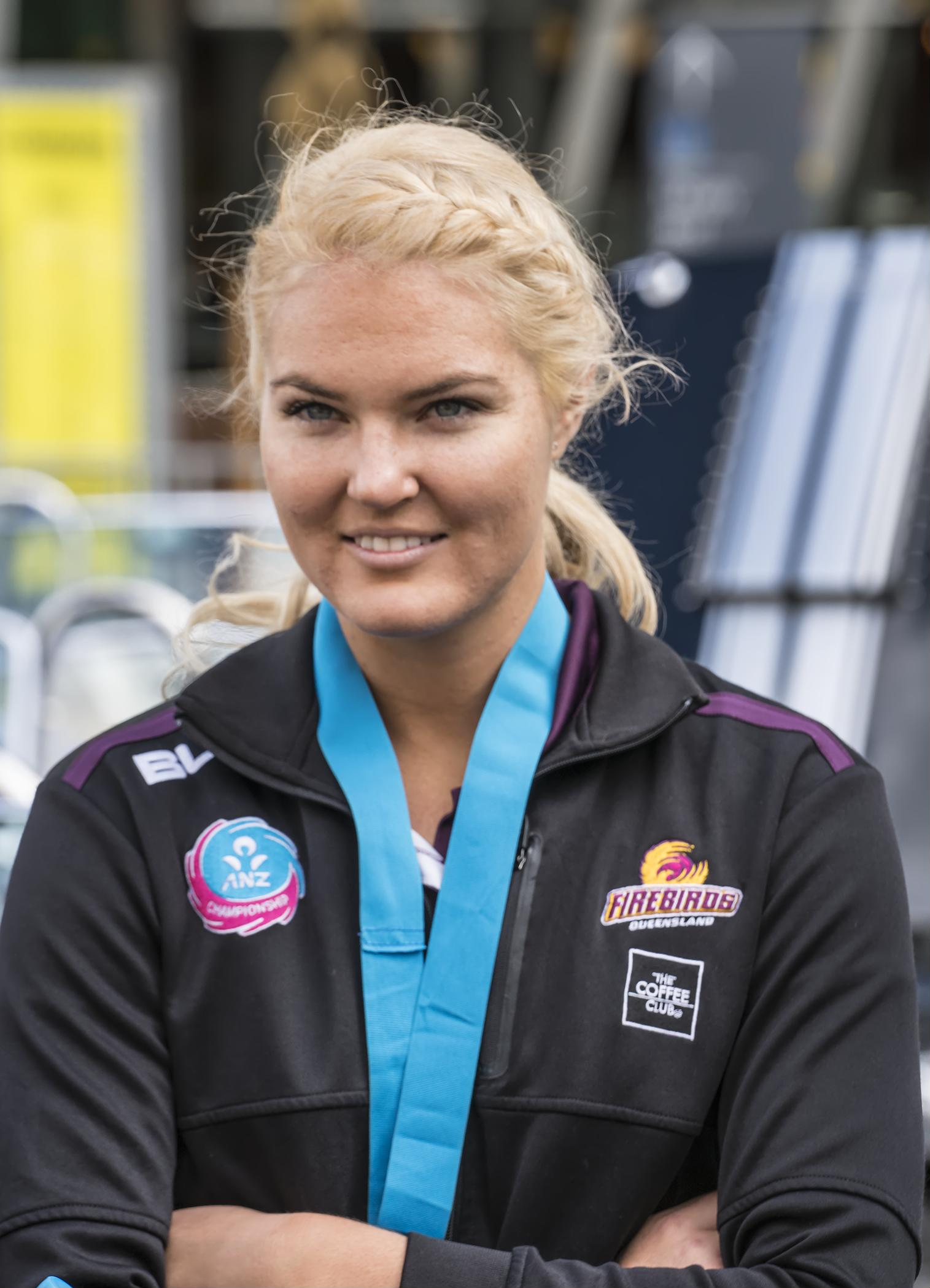
Gretel Bueta, 2019 Liz Ellis Diamond winner and Australian International Player of the Year.

Year	Winner	Team
2001	Kathryn Harby-Williams	Adelaide Thunderbirds
2002	Sharelle McMahon	Melbourne Phoenix
2003	Sharelle McMahon (2)	Melbourne Phoenix
2004	Catherine Cox	Sydney Swifts
2005	Catherine Cox (2)	Sydney Swifts
2006	Jessica Shynn	Perth Orioles
2007	Natalie von Bertouch	Adelaide Thunderbirds
2008	Mo'onia Gerrard	Adelaide Thunderbirds
2009	Renae Hallinan	Melbourne Vixens
2010	Mo'onia Gerrard (2)	Adelaide Thunderbirds
2011	Kimberlee Green	New South Wales Swifts
2012	Madison Robinson	Melbourne Vixens
2013	Renae Hallinan (2)	Adelaide Thunderbirds
2014	Madison Robinson (2)	Melbourne Vixens
2015	Caitlin Bassett	West Coast Fever
2017	Sharni Layton	Collingwood Magpies
2018	Liz Watson	Melbourne Vixens
2019	Gretel Bueta	Queensland Firebirds
2021	Liz Watson (2)	Melbourne Vixens
2022	Liz Watson (3)	Melbourne Vixens
2022	Courtney Bruce	West Coast Fever
2023	Courtney Bruce (2)	West Coast Fever
2024	Sophie Garbin	Melbourne Vixens
2025	Kate Moloney	Melbourne Vixens
2026	Georgie Horjus	Adelaide Thunderbirds

=== Australian Netball Hall of Fame ===
The following Australian netball international players have been inducted into Australian Netball Hall of Fame.

Inducted	Players	Caps	State	Years
2008 (Note: Elevated to Legend status in 2015 - Legend #1)	Joyce Brown	9	Victoria	1963
2008	Margaret Caldow	27	Victoria	1963–1979
2008	Jean Cowan	3	Victoria	1938–1948
2008	Eunice Gill	?	Victoria	1948
2008 (Note: Elevated to Legend status in 2019 - Legend #3)	Anne Sargeant	52	New South Wales	1978–1988
2008	Vicki Wilson	104	Queensland	1985–1999
2009	Michelle den Dekker	84	South Australia	1985–1995
2009	Lorna McConchie	1	Victoria	1938
2009 (Note: Elevated to Legend status in 2023 - Legend #6)	Jill McIntosh	29	Western Australia	1981–1986
2009	Gaye Teede	17	Western Australia	1966–1979
2010 (Note: Elevated to Legend status in 2022 - Legend #5)	Christine Burton	?	South Australia	1964–1975
2010	Carissa Dalwood	91	New South Wales	1989–1999
2010	Keeley Devery-Cox	63	New South Wales	1985–1993
2010	Kathryn Harby-Williams	94	South Australia	1990–2003
2010	Simone McKinnis	63	Victoria	1986–1998
2010	Shelley O'Donnell	80	Victoria	1990–1999
2010 (Note: Elevated to Legend status in 2021 - Legend #4)	Wilma Shakespear	7	Victoria	1963
2011	Liz Ellis	122	New South Wales	1993–2007
2011	Julie Francou	32	South Australia	1975–1985
2012	Myrtle Craddock	3	Victoria	1948–1954
2012	Annette Foley Simper	12	Western Australia	1960–1971
2014	Pat McCarthy	4	Victoria	1952–1956
2015 (Note: Elevated to Legend status in 2025 - Legend #7)	Norma Plummer	16	Victoria	1972–1981
2015	Marcia Ella-Duncan	18	New South Wales	1986–1987
2019	Sharelle McMahon	118	Victoria	1998–2011
2019	Elsma Merillo	11	Western Australia	1967–1971
2021	Dorothy Lavater	3	Western Australia	1956–1967
2022	Margaret Molina	14	Victoria	1969–1978
2022	Stella Northey	15	Victoria	1967–1978
2023	Sue Kenny	62	New South Wales	1986–1994
2023	Pam Redmond	29	Victoria	1975–1981
2024	Natalie von Bertouch	76	South Australia	2004–2013
2024	Terese Kennedy	15	New South Wales	1970–19xx
2025	Sharon Burton	25	South Australia	1975-1979
2025	Nicole Cusack	52	New South Wales	1989-1998
2026	Catherine Cox	108	New South Wales	1997–2013
2026	Laura Geitz	71	Queensland	2008–2018

== Gallery ==
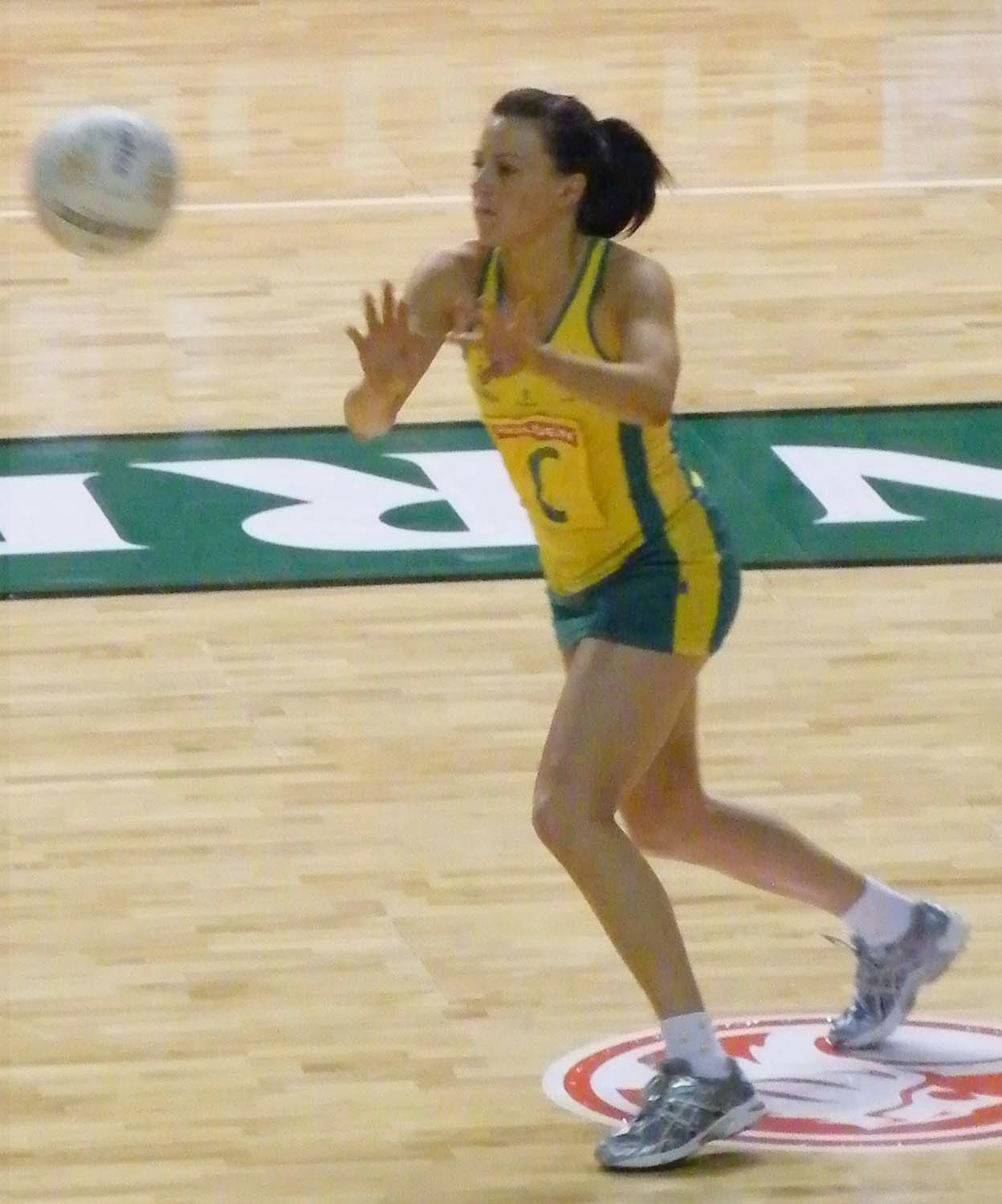
Natalie von Bertouch, 2004–2013, 76 caps, 2007 Australian International Player of the Year, 2010 Liz Ellis Diamond.

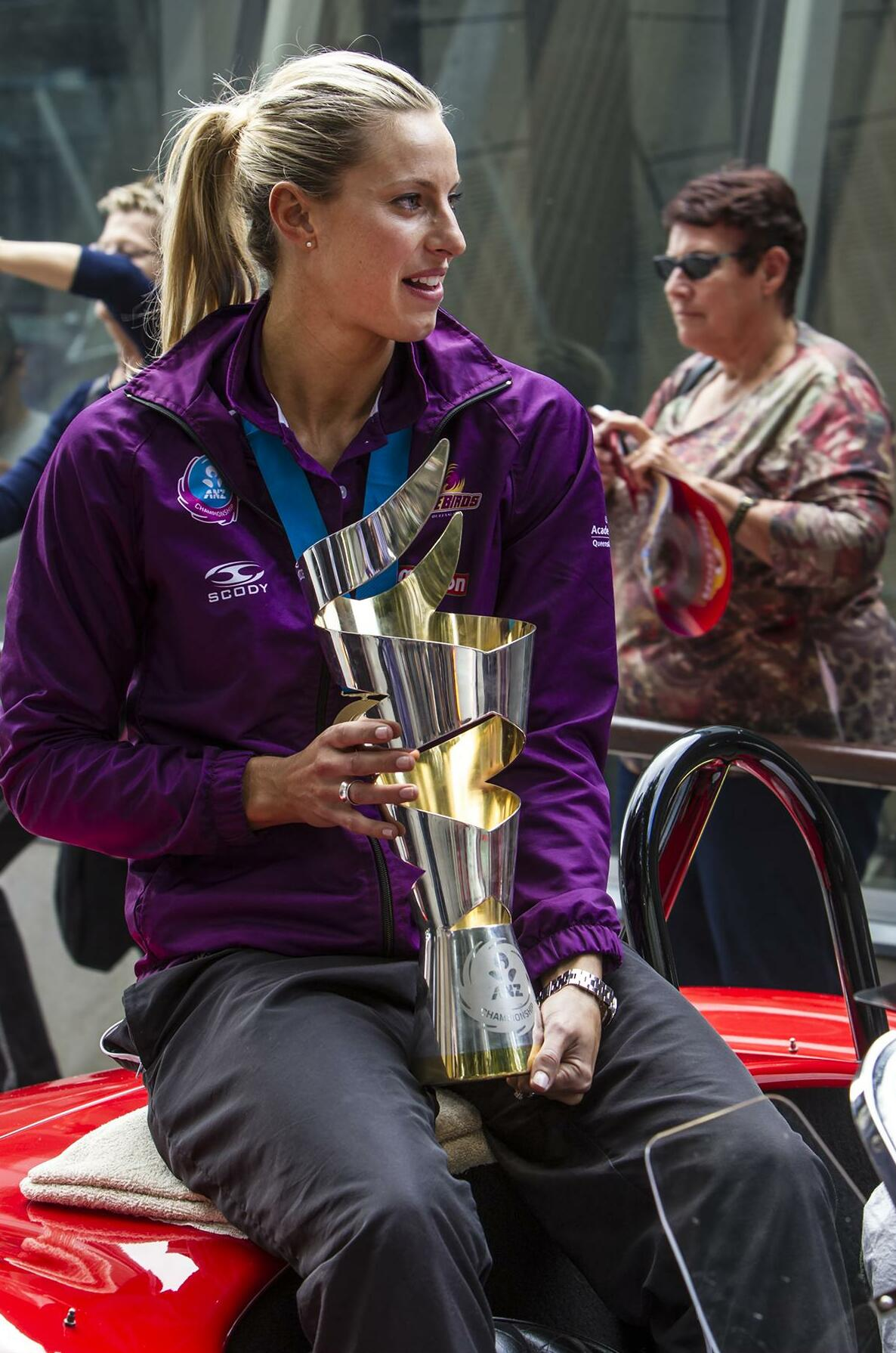
Laura Geitz, 2008–2018, 71 caps, 2011 Liz Ellis Diamond.

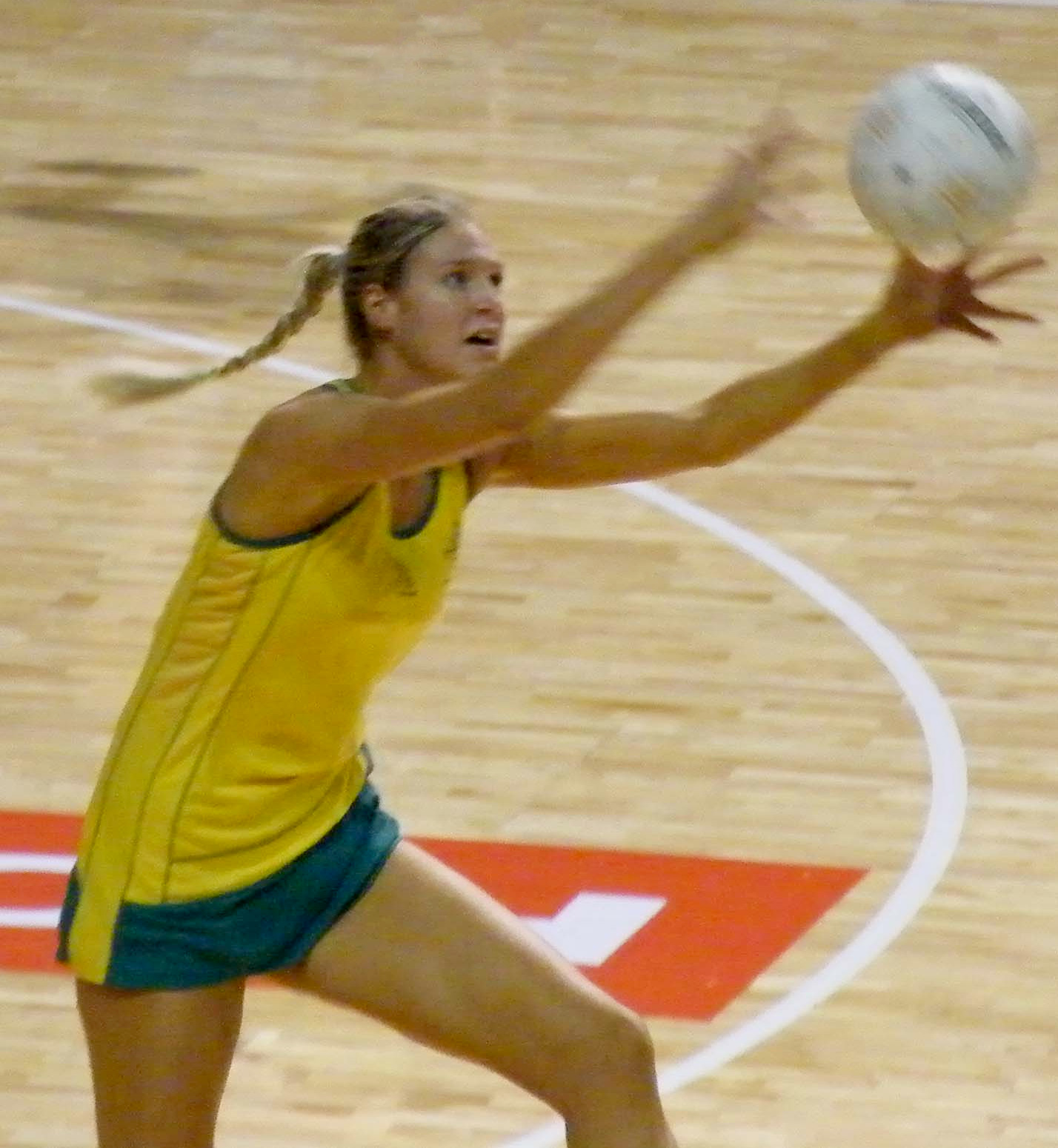
Caitlin Bassett, 102 caps since 2008. 2015 Australian International Player of the Year and Liz Ellis Diamond

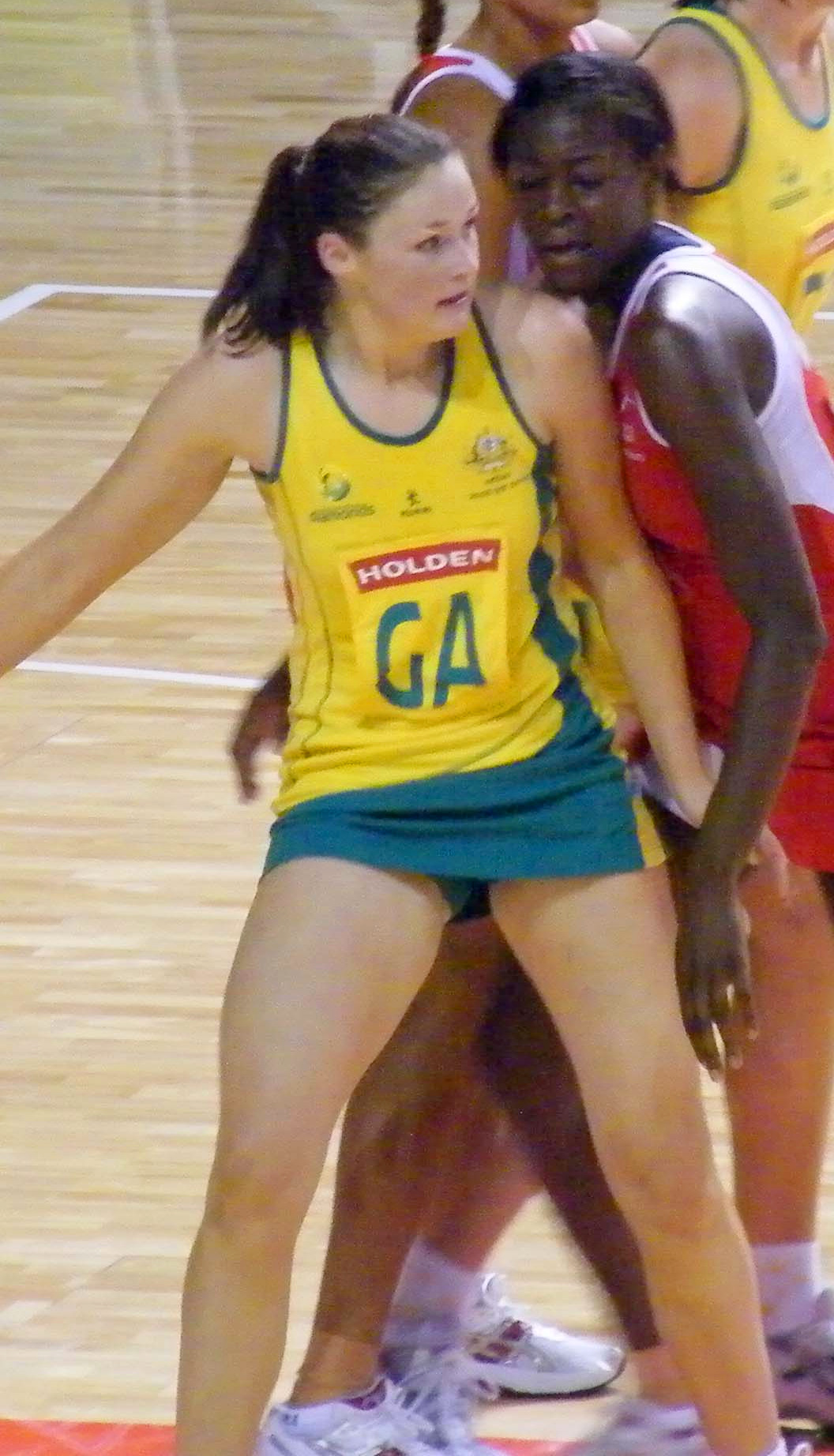
Susan Pettitt, 2006–2018, 71 caps.

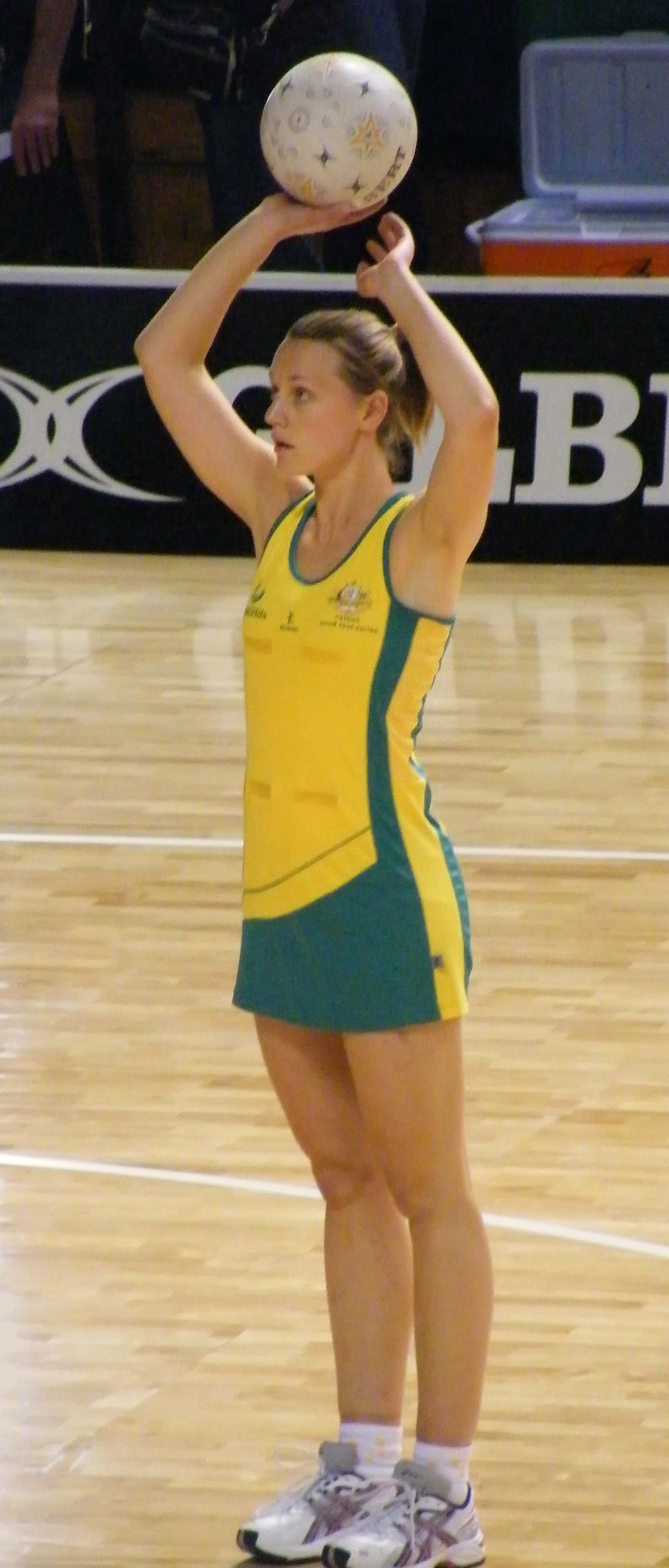
Natalie Medhurst, 2007–2020, 86 caps.
