= List of netball coaches in Australia =

Netball coaches in Australia

The following is a list of notable netball coaches in Australia.

== National team head coaches ==
The following is a list of head coaches of the Australia national netball team.

Years	Head coaches	Tournaments
1956	Lorna McConchie	1956 tour of England, Scotland and Ceylon
1960	Eunice Gill	1960 tour of New Zealand
1963	Lorna McConchie	1963 World Netball Tournament
1967	Margaret Pewtress	1967 World Netball Tournament
1971	Wilma Ritchie	1971 World Netball Tournament
1975	Joyce Brown	1975 World Netball Tournament
1979	Wilma Shakespear	1979 World Netball Tournament
1983	Joyce Brown	1983 World Netball Tournament
1985	Pamela Barham	1985 World Games
1987–1989	Wilma Shakespear	1987 World Netball Tournament; 1989 World Games
1990	Margaret Corbett	1990 Commonwealth Games
1990	Gaye Teede	
1991–1993	Joyce Brown	1991 World Netball Championships; 1993 World Games
1995–2003	Jill McIntosh	1995 World Netball Championships; 1998 Commonwealth Games; 1999 World Netball Championships; 2002 Commonwealth Games; 2003 World Netball Championships
2003–2011	Norma Plummer	2006 Commonwealth Games; 2007 World Netball Championships; 2010 Constellation Cup; 2010 Commonwealth Games; 2011 Constellation Cup; 2011 World Netball Championships
2011–2020	Lisa Alexander	2011 Constellation Cup; 2012 Constellation Cup; 2013 Constellation Cup; 2014 Commonwealth Games; 2014 Constellation Cup; 2015 Netball World Cup; 2015 Constellation Cup; 2016 Netball Quad Series; 2016 Constellation Cup; 2017 Netball Quad Series (January/February); 2017 Netball Quad Series (August/September); 2017 Constellation Cup; 2018 Netball Quad Series (January); 2018 Commonwealth Games; 2018 Netball Quad Series (September); 2018 Constellation Cup; 2019 Netball Quad Series; 2019 Netball World Cup; 2019 Constellation Cup
2020–	Stacey Marinkovich	2021 Constellation Cup

== Premiership winning coaches ==
The following is a list of head coaches who have guided teams to premierships.

=== Esso/Mobil Superleague ===
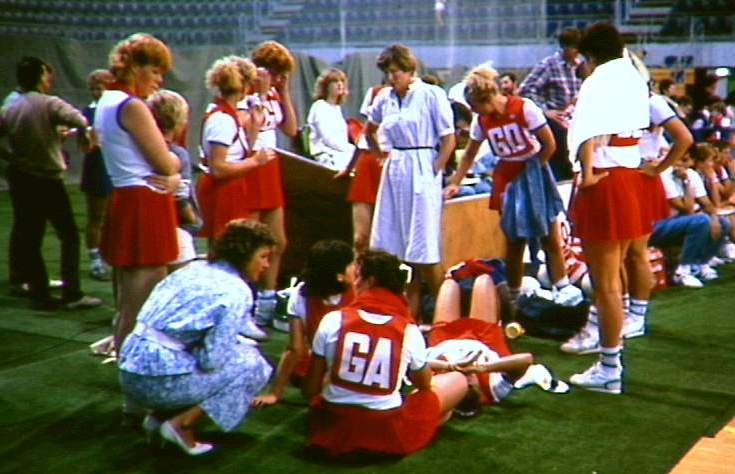
Wilma Shakespear coaching the Australian Institute of Sport team in 1986. Shakespear coached the Australia national netball team at the 1971, 1979 and 1987 World Netball Tournaments and at the 1989 World Games. She also guided AIS to two premierships in 1985 and 1986.

Season	Head coaches	Team
1985	Wilma Shakespear	Australian Institute of Sport
1986	Wilma Shakespear	Australian Institute of Sport
1987		Melbourne Blues
1989	Anne Sargeant	Sydney Tigers
1990	Norma Plummer	Melbourne City
1991	Carol Sykes	Sydney Pulsars
1992	Margaret Corbett	Sydney Pulsars
1993	Patricia Mickan	Adelaide Garville
1994	Margaret Angove	Adelaide Contax
1995	Carol Sykes	Sydney Electricity
1996	Norma Plummer	Melbourne Pumas

=== Commonwealth Bank Trophy ===
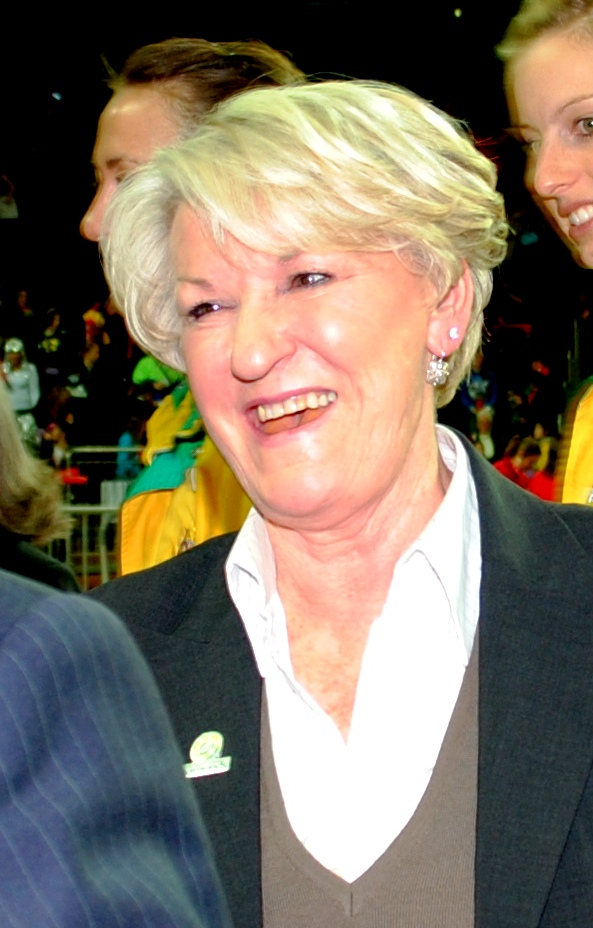
Norma Plummer coached the Australia national netball team between 2003 and 2011. She previously guided Melbourne City and Melbourne Pumas to premierships during the Esso/Mobil Superleague era before guiding Melbourne Phoenix to the inaugural Commonwealth Bank Trophy in 1997.

Season	Head coaches	Team
1997	Norma Plummer	Melbourne Phoenix
1998	Margaret Angove	Adelaide Thunderbirds
1999	Margaret Angove	Adelaide Thunderbirds
2000	Joyce Brown	Melbourne Phoenix
2001	Julie Fitzgerald	Sydney Swifts
2002	Lisa Alexander	Melbourne Phoenix
2003	Lisa Alexander	Melbourne Phoenix
2004	Julie Fitzgerald	Sydney Swifts
2005	Julie Hoornweg	Melbourne Phoenix
2006	Julie Fitzgerald	Sydney Swifts
2007	Julie Fitzgerald	Sydney Swifts

=== ANZ Championship ===
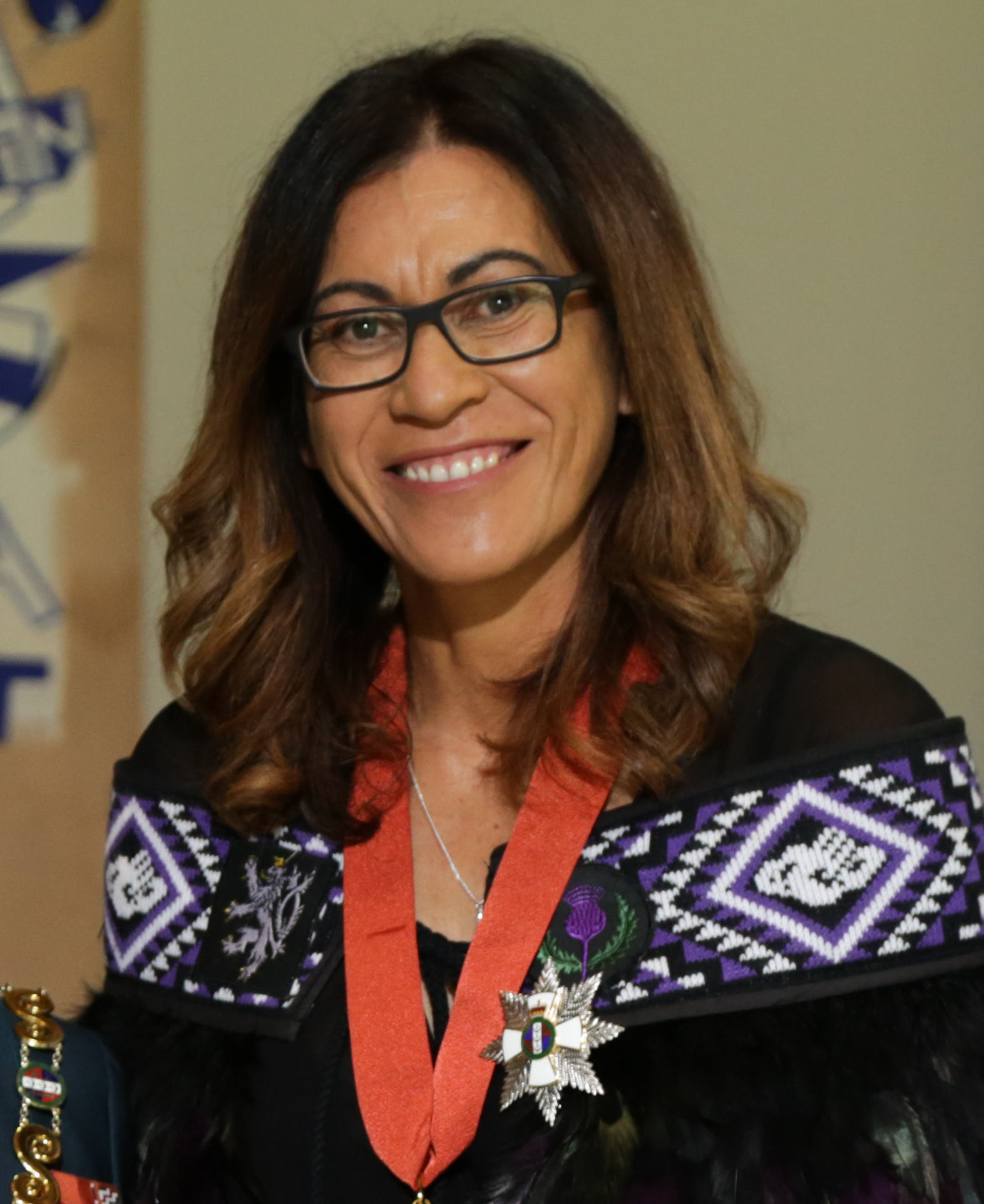
Noeline Taurua guided Waikato Bay of Plenty Magic to the 2012 ANZ Championship and Sunshine Coast Lightning to the 2017 and 2018 Suncorp Super Netball titles

Season	Head coaches	Team
2008	Julie Fitzgerald	New South Wales Swifts
2009	Julie Hoornweg	Melbourne Vixens
2010	Jane Woodlands-Thompson	Adelaide Thunderbirds
2011	Roselee Jencke	Queensland Firebirds
2012	Noeline Taurua	Waikato Bay of Plenty Magic
2013	Jane Woodlands-Thompson	Adelaide Thunderbirds
2014	Simone McKinnis	Melbourne Vixens
2015	Roselee Jencke	Queensland Firebirds
2016	Roselee Jencke	Queensland Firebirds

=== Suncorp Super Netball ===
Season	Head coaches	Team
2017	Noeline Taurua	Sunshine Coast Lightning
2018	Noeline Taurua	Sunshine Coast Lightning
2019	Briony Akle	New South Wales Swifts
2020	Simone McKinnis	Melbourne Vixens
2021	Briony Akle	New South Wales Swifts
2022	Dan Ryan	West Coast Fever
2023	Tania Obst	Adelaide Thunderbirds
2024	Tania Obst	Adelaide Thunderbirds
2025	Simone McKinnis	Melbourne Vixens
2026	Tania Obst	Adelaide Thunderbirds

== Australian Netball Awards ==
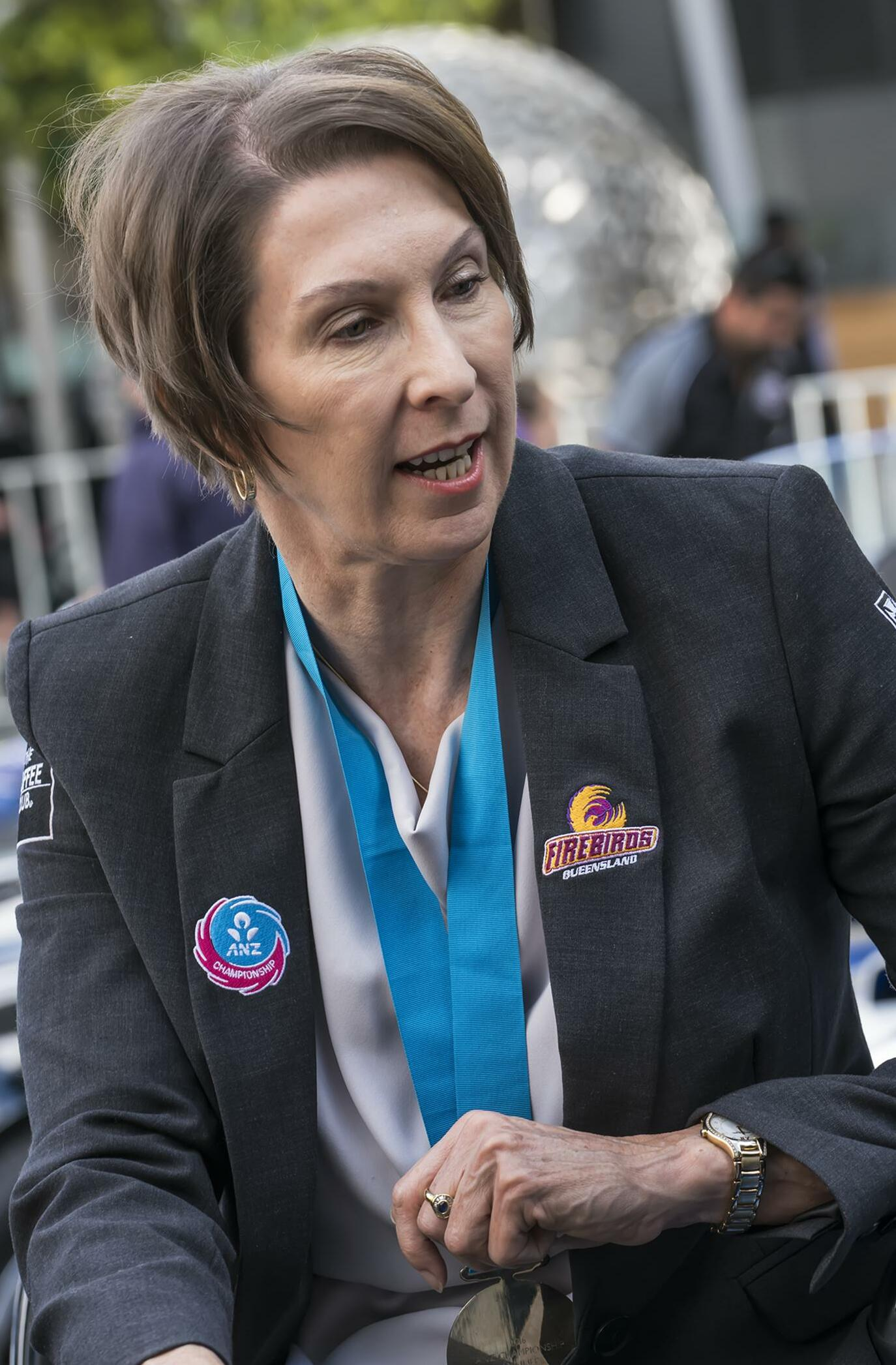
Between 2011 and 2016, Roselee Jencke guided Queensland Firebirds to five ANZ Championship grand finals, winning three premierships in 2011, 2015 and 2016.

=== Netball Australia Coach of the Year ===
Season	Player	Team
2004	Julie Fitzgerald	Sydney Swifts
2005	Julie Hoornweg	Melbourne Phoenix
2006	Julie Fitzgerald (2)	Sydney Swifts
2007	Julie Fitzgerald (3)	Sydney Swifts

=== Australian ANZ Championship Coach of the Year ===
Season	Winner	Team
2008	Julie Fitzgerald (4)	New South Wales Swifts
2009	Julie Hoornweg (2)	Melbourne Vixens
2010	Jane Woodlands-Thompson	Adelaide Thunderbirds
2011	Roselee Jencke	Queensland Firebirds
2012	Julie Hoornweg (3)	Melbourne Vixens
2013	Jane Woodlands-Thompson (2)	Adelaide Thunderbirds
2014	Simone McKinnis	Melbourne Vixens
2015	Roselee Jencke (2)	Queensland Firebirds
2016	Roselee Jencke (3)	Queensland Firebirds

=== Joyce Brown Coach of the Year ===
In 2014 Netball Australia introduced the Joyce Brown Coach of the Year award in honour of Joyce Brown.

Season	Winner	Team
2014	Roselee Jencke	Queensland Firebirds
2015	Lisa Alexander	Australia
2016	Not presented	
2017	Simone McKinnis	Melbourne Vixens
2018	Stacey Marinkovich	West Coast Fever
2019	Briony Akle	New South Wales Swifts
2020	Simone McKinnis (2)	Melbourne Vixens
2021	Briony Akle (2)	New South Wales Swifts
2022	Stacey Marinkovich (2)	Australian Diamonds
2023	Stacey Marinkovich (3)	Australian Diamonds
2024	Tania Obst	Adelaide Thunderbirds
2025	Simone McKinnis (3)	Melbourne Vixens
2026	Tania Obst (2)	Adelaide Thunderbirds

== Foxtel ANZ Championship All Star coaches ==
Season	Winner	Team
2011	Roselee Jencke	Queensland Firebirds
2012	Noeline Taurua	Waikato Bay of Plenty Magic
2013	Jane Woodlands-Thompson	Adelaide Thunderbirds
2014	Julie Fitzgerald	Waikato Bay of Plenty Magic
2015	Stacey Rosman	West Coast Fever
2016	Robert Wright	New South Wales Swifts
