= Lorna McConchie =

Australian netball player and coach

Personal information
- Full name: Lorna Jean McConchie
- Born: 22 July 1914 Melbourne, Victoria
- Died: 9 December 2001 (aged 87)
- Occupation: University lecturer
- School: University High School
- University: University of Melbourne

Netball career
- Playing positions: GA, GS
Years	Club team	Apps
192x–193x	East Kew (East Kew)	
192x–193x	University High School Old Pupils	
192x–193x	Melbourne University	
1931–1940	Victoria	
Years	National team	Caps
1938	Australia	1
Coaching career
- Years: Team
- 1959–1979: Melbourne University
- 1956: Australia
- 1963: Australia

Lorna Jean McConchie (22 July 1914 – 9 December 2001) was a former Australia netball international and national team head coach. In 1938 McConchie played for Australia in their first international match against New Zealand. McConchie was later head coach when Australia won the inaugural 1963 World Netball Tournament. In 2009 she was inducted into the Australian Netball Hall of Fame.

== Early life and education ==
McConchie attended East Kew Primary School and University High School before studying physical education at the University of Melbourne. She subsequently became a lecturer at Melbourne and helped establish the university's physical education course. One of her students was Eunice Gill who was influenced by McConchie's views and went on to play, coach and administer Australian netball. In 1949, McConchie represented the Australian Physical Education Association at the first women's conference in Denmark.

== Playing career ==
=== Clubs ===
McConchie played netball for East Kew, winning premierships in 1928, 1929 and 1930. She also played for University High School Old Pupils and Melbourne University.

=== Victoria ===
Between 1931 and 1940, McConchie played for Victoria in the Australian National Netball Championships. In 2000, together with Sharelle McMahon, Wilma Shakespear, Myrtle Baylis, Shelley O'Donnell and Simone McKinnis, McConchie was named in Netball Victoria's Team of the Century.

=== Australia ===
On 20 August 1938, McConchie played for Australia in a 40–11 win against New Zealand at Royal Park, Melbourne. This was the first netball Test between Australia and New Zealand. She was then named vice-captain of the Australia team that was due to tour New Zealand in 1940. However the tour was cancelled due to the outbreak of World War II.

== Coaching career ==
=== University of Melbourne ===
Between 1959 and 1979, McConchie coached several Melbourne University club teams .

=== Australia ===
In 1956, McConchie was head coach when Australia toured England, Scotland and Ceylon. The team was captained by Pat McCarthy. She was also head coach when Australia won the inaugural 1963 World Netball Tournament. The team featured Joyce Brown and Wilma Shakespear.

Tournaments	Place
1963 World Netball Tournament	1st place, gold medalist(s)

== Umpire and administrator ==
McConchie also served as a netball umpire and sports administrator. She served three terms as President of Netball Victoria in 1955–58, 1969–70, and 1980–81. In 1959, she was one of two Australian delegates at the inaugural conference of the International Netball Federation. This conference helped formulate the modern rules of netball. She subsequently became a member of the INF's rules interpretation committee and attended every World Netball Championship between 1967 and 1983 in this capacity.

== Honours ==
=== Head coach ===
Australia

- World Netball Tournament
  - Winners: 1963

=== Individual awards ===
Year	Award
1951	Netball Victoria Life Membership
1966	AANA Service Award
1991	World Netball Service Award
1998	Netball Victoria Hall of Fame
2000	Australian Sports Medal
2004	Victorian Honour Roll of Women
2009	Australian Netball Hall of Fame
