= Pat McCarthy (netball) =

Australia netball international

Personal information
- Full name: Pat McCarthy (Née: Doherty )
- Born: July 1931 Victoria, Australia
- Died: January 2023 (aged 91)
- Height: 147 cm (4 ft 10 in)
- Spouse: Michael Clement McCarthy

Netball career
Years	National team	Caps
1952–1956	Australia	4

Pat McCarthy, also known as Pat Doherty, is a former Australia netball international. In 1956 she captained Australia when they toured England, Scotland and Ceylon. The tour saw Australia play against England for the first time. In 2014, McCarthy was inducted into the Australian Netball Hall of Fame.

== Playing career ==
=== Australia ===
McCarthy began playing for Australia in 1952. Initially she did not play in full internationals, but against Rest of Australia teams at inter-state sports carnivals. In 1956 McCarthy captained Australia when they toured England, Scotland and Ceylon. The team's head coach was Lorna McConchie. McCarthy made her senior debut for Australia on 11 February 1956 in a 22–12 win against Ceylon at St. Bridget's Convent, Colombo. During the tour Australia played against England for the first time. On 12 May 1956, Australia defeated England 14–11. In 2000, together with Sharelle McMahon, Wilma Shakespear, Myrtle Baylis, Shelley O'Donnell and Simone McKinnis, McCarthy was named in Netball Victoria's Team of the Century. In 2014, McCarthy was inducted into the Australian Netball Hall of Fame.
