= Margaret Caldow =

Australia netball international and coach

Margaret Caldow OAM BEM
Personal information
- Full name: Margaret Elaine Caldow (née: Jackson)
- Born: 28 November 1941 (age 84) Hobart, Tasmania

Netball career
- Playing position: GA
| Years | Club team | Apps |
| 1960s–1970s | Melbourne Blues | |
| 1961–1979 | Victoria | |
| Years | National team | Caps |
| 1963–1979 | Australia | 27 |
Coaching career
- Years: Team
- 1991–1995: Victorian Institute of Sport
- 2002–2003: Melbourne Kestrels
- 2004–2007: England
Medal record
Representing Australia
World Netball Tournament
| Gold medal – first place | 1963 Eastbourne | Team |
| Gold medal – first place | 1975 Auckland | Team |
| Gold medal – first place | 1979 Port of Spain | Team |

Margaret Elaine Caldow OAM BEM (born 28 November 1941), also known as Marg Caldow, is a former Australia netball international and a former England head coach. She represented Australia at the 1963, 1975 and the 1979 World Netball Tournaments, winning three gold medals. She captained Australia at the 1975 and 1979 tournaments. Between 2004 and 2007, Caldow served as head coach of England. She was the England head coach at both the 2006 Commonwealth Games and the 2007 World Netball Championships. Between 2013 and 2018, Caldow served as Lisa Alexander's assistant with Australia. In 1978 Caldow was awarded the British Empire Medal and in 2009 she was awarded the Medal of the Order of Australia.

== Early life ==
Born in Tasmania, Caldow moved to Melbourne in 1957. In her youth, as Margaret Jackson, she represented both Tasmania and Victoria in track and field athletics and netball. However, in 1960 she decided to concentrate on netball.

== Playing career ==
=== Victoria ===
Between 1961 and 1979, Caldow played for Victoria in the Australian National Netball Championships. She captained the team for eight years. In 2000, together with Sharelle McMahon, Wilma Shakespear, Joyce Brown, Shelley O'Donnell and Simone McKinnis, Caldow was named in Netball Victoria's Team of the Century. The Victorian Netball League's Championship MVP award is named the Margaret Caldow Trophy after Caldow.

=== Australia ===
Between 1963 and 1979, Caldow made 27 senior appearances for Australia. She had previously represented Australia at schoolgirl level. She played for Australia at the 1963, 1975 and the 1979 World Netball Tournaments, winning three gold medals. She captained Australia at the 1975 and 1979 tournaments. In 2008, Caldow was inducted into the Australian Netball Hall of Fame.

| Tournaments | Place |
|---|---|
| 1963 World Netball Tournament | 1st place, gold medalist(s) |
| 1975 World Netball Tournament | 1st place, gold medalist(s) |
| 1979 World Netball Tournament | 1st place, gold medalist(s) |

== Coaching career ==
=== Victorian Institute of Sport ===
Between 1991 and 1995, Caldow served as head netball coach at the Victorian Institute of Sport, mentoring among others, Sharelle McMahon.

=== Melbourne Kestrels ===
Between 2002 and 2003, Caldow served as head coach of Melbourne Kestrels in the Commonwealth Bank Trophy league.

=== England ===
Between 2004 and 2007, Caldow served as head coach of England. She was the England head coach at both the 2006 Commonwealth Games and the 2007 World Netball Championships. Caldow was credited with mentoring Louisa Brownfield, Joanne Harten, Rachel Dunn and Pamela Cookey. On 13 May 2007 she also guided England to a 50–45 win against New Zealand. At the time, New Zealand were the reigning World and Commonwealth champions. It was also England's first win over New Zealand in thirty two years.

| Tournaments | Place |
|---|---|
| 2006 Commonwealth Games | 3rd place, bronze medalist(s) |
| 2007 World Netball Championships | 4th |

=== Australia ===
Caldow has also been a selector, assistant coach and specialist coach with Australia. She became a national selector in 1981. Between 1984 and 1985 she was an assistant coach at the Australian Institute of Sport. She was also an assistant coach with Australia at the 1987 World Netball Championships. Between 2013 and 2018, Caldow served as Lisa Alexander's assistant/shooting specialist. During this time, she was a member of Australia's coaching team at the 2015 Netball World Cup and at the 2014 and 2018 Commonwealth Games.

== Honours ==
=== Player ===
Australia

- World Netball Tournament
  - Winners: 1963, 1975, 1979

=== Individual awards ===
| Year | Award |
|---|---|
| 1978 | British Empire Medal |
| 1985 | Sport Australia Hall of Fame |
| 1995 | Netball Australia Service Award |
| 2000 | Netball Victoria Hall of Fame |
| 2000 | Australian Sports Medal |
| 2002 | Netball Victoria Life Membership |
| 2008 | Australian Netball Hall of Fame |
| 2009 | Medal of the Order of Australia |
| 2019 | Netball Tasmania Hall of Fame |

== Bibliography ==
Wilma Shakespear, Margaret Caldow: Netball:Steps to Success (1979)
