= Fijian Australians =

Total population
- 66,043 Fijian (by ancestry, 2021); 16,211 Fijian Indian (by ancestry, 2011); 68,961 (by birth, 2021)

Regions with significant populations
- Sydney • Brisbane • Melbourne (Note: At least 5% of Norfolk Island has Fijian heritage.)

Languages
- English • Fijian • Fiji Hindi

Religion
- Hinduism • Christianity • Islam

Related ethnic groups
- Fijians

The number of permanent settlers arriving in Australia from Fiji since 1991 (monthly)

Fijian Australians refers to Australian citizens or residents of Australia who are of ethnic iTaukei or Indian descent. Most Fijians Australians live in New South Wales (Sydney), Queensland (Brisbane) and Victoria (Melbourne).

People born in Fiji as a percentage of the population in Sydney divided geographically by postal area, as of the 2011 census.

Australia is home to the largest Fijian population in the world outside Fiji itself.

According to the 2011 Australian census 48,141 Australians were born in Fiji. Most Fijians in Australia are Fiji Hindi-speaking Indo-Fijians. In 2011, 57% of Fijian-born reported either 'Indian' or 'Fijian-Indian' ancestry.

Many Fijian Australians have established names for themselves in professional Australian sport, particularly in rugby union, rugby league and Australian rules football.

== Notable Fijian Australians ==
=== Fijian Australians of iTaukei ethnicity ===
- Reagan Campbell-Gillard
- Alipate Carlile
- Petero Civoniceva
- Ellia Green
- Jarryd Hayne
- Scott Higginbotham
- Apisai Koroisau
- Chris Kuridrani
- Tevita Kuridrani
- Setanta Ó hAilpín
- Nemani Nadolo
- Noa Nadruku
- Nic Naitanui
- Simone Nalatu
- Paulini
- Esava Ratugolea
- David Rodan
- John Sutton
- Manoa Thompson
- MC Trey
- Lote Tuqiri
- Samu Wara
- Jason Bukuya
- Ashton Sims
- Korbin Sims
- Ruan Sims
- Tariq Sims

=== Fijian Australians of Indian ethnicity ===
- Noor Dean
- Nalini Krishan
- Julian Moti
- Neil Prakash
- Vijay Mishra
- Sudesh Mishra
- Paresh Narayan
- Jack Ram
- K. C. Ramrakha
- Jason Singh
- Lisa Singh
- Ben Volavola
- Shilpa Sharlene Kumar
