= Meegan =

Meegan is both a surname and a given name. Notable people with the name include:

Surname:

- Dave Meegan (born 1963), Irish record producer
- George Meegan (born 1952), British long-distance walker
- Michael Elmore-Meegan (born 1959), British-born Irish humanitarian and founder of ICROSS
- Paddy Meegan (1922–2012), Irish Gaelic footballer
- Pete Meegan (1862–1905), American baseball player

Given name:

- Meegan Fitzharris (born 1972), Australian politician
- Meegan Rooney (born 1984), Australian netball player
- Meegan Warner (born 1991), Australian actress

== See also ==
- Meehan (disambiguation)
