= Australian Netball Hall of Fame =

Netball Hall of Fame

The Australian Netball Hall of Fame was established by Netball Australia in 2008. The inaugural inductees included Margaret Caldow, Anne Sargeant, Vicki Wilson and Joyce Brown.

== Athlete members ==
The following Australian netball international players have been inducted into the Hall of Fame.

Inducted	Players	Caps	State	Years
2008	Margaret Caldow	27	Victoria	1963–1979
2008	Jean Cowan	3	Victoria	1938–1948
2008	Anne Sargeant	52	New South Wales	1978–1988
2008	Vicki Wilson	104	Queensland	1985–1999
2009	Michelle den Dekker	84	South Australia	1985–1995
2009	Jill McIntosh	29	Western Australia	1981–1986
2009	Gaye Teede	17	Western Australia	1966–1979
2010	Carissa Dalwood Tombs	91	New South Wales	1989–1999
2010	Keeley Devery-Cox	63	New South Wales	1985–1993
2010	Kathryn Harby-Williams	94	South Australia	1990–2003
2010	Simone McKinnis	63	Victoria	1986–1998
2010	Shelley O'Donnell	80	Victoria	1990–1999
2011	Liz Ellis	122	New South Wales	1993–2007
2011	Julie Francou	32	South Australia	1975–1985
2012	Myrtle Craddock	3	Victoria	1948–1954
2012	Annette Foley Simper	12	Western Australia	1960–1971
2014	Pat McCarthy	4	Victoria	1952–1956
2015	Norma Plummer	16	Victoria	1972–1981
2015	Marcia Ella-Duncan	18	New South Wales	1986–1987
2019	Sharelle McMahon	118	Victoria	1998–2011
2019	Elsma Merillo	11	Western Australia	1967–1971
2021	Dorothy Lavater	3	Western Australia	1956–1967

== General members ==
The following umpires, administrators and coaches have been inducted into the Hall of Fame.

Inducted	Inductee	Role	State
2008	Joyce Brown	Coach	Victoria
2008	Eunice Gill	Administrator	Victoria
2008	Deirdre Hyland AM	Administrator	Queensland
2009	Lorna McConchie	Umpire, Administrator	Victoria
2009	Gweneth Benzie AM	Umpire, Administrator	South Australia
2009	Anne Clark BEM	Umpire, Administrator	New South Wales
2010	Wilma Shakespear	Coach	Victoria
2010	Maureen Boyle OAM	Umpire	New South Wales
2010	Margaret Pewtress OAM	Umpire, Coach, Administrator	Victoria
2010	Dorothy McHugh OAM	Umpire, Administrator	New South Wales
2010	Christine Burton	Umpire	South Australia
2010	Dr. Grace Bryant OAM	Team doctor	New South Wales

== Gallery ==
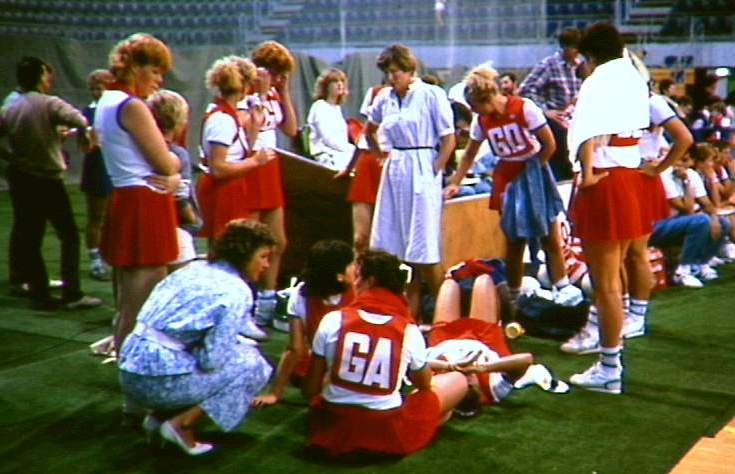
Wilma Shakespear, a former Australia netball international, Australia head coach and sports administrator. 2010 Australian Netball Hall of Fame Inductee

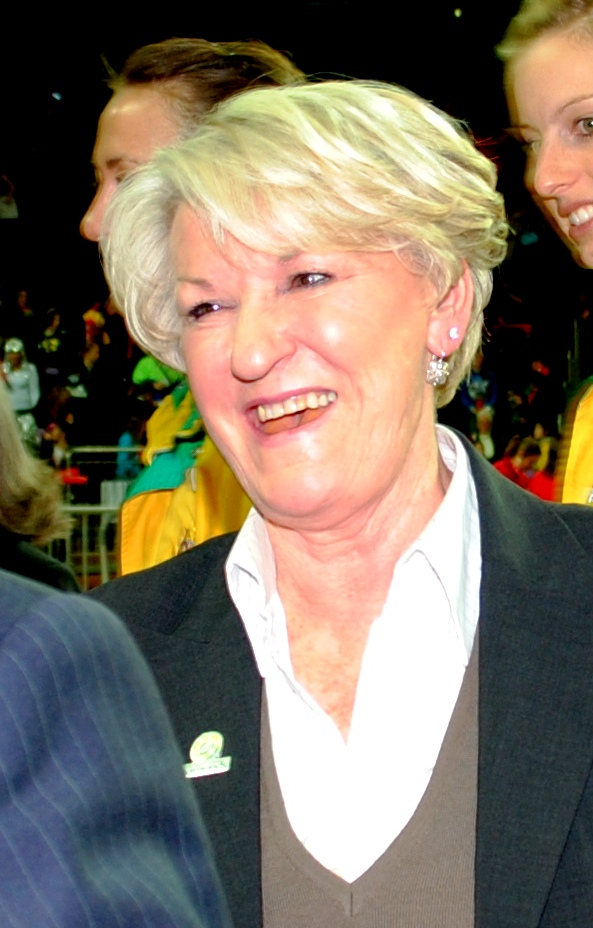
Norma Plummer, a former Australia netball international and Australia head coach. 2015 Australian Netball Hall of Fame Inductee

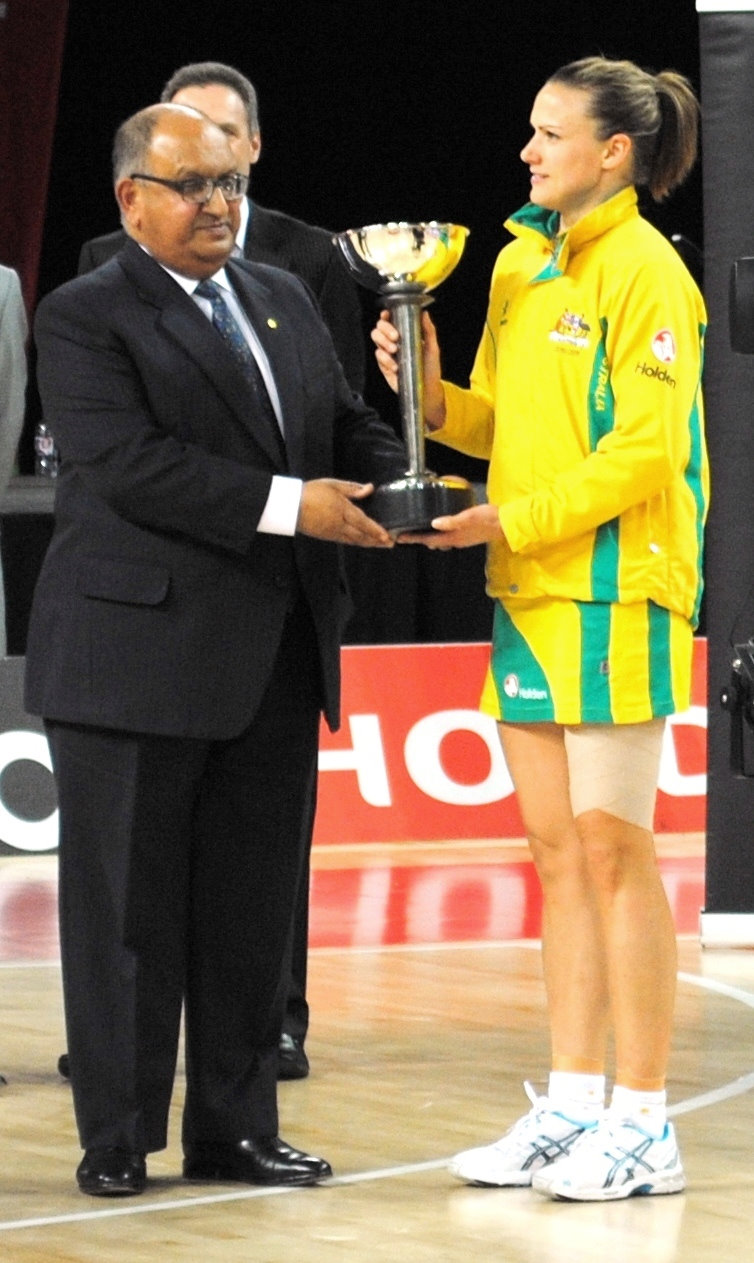
Sharelle McMahon, 1998–2011, 118 caps, 2002 and 2003 Australian International Player of the Year. 2019 Australian Netball Hall of Fame Inductee.
