= Ray Jencke =

Personal information
- Full name: Ray Jencke
- Born: 25 March 1966 (age 60); Pakenham, Victoria, Australia
- Height: 185 cm (6 ft 1 in)
- Weight: 82 kg (181 lb)
- Position: Half back flank

Playing career^{1}
Years	Club	Games (Goals)
1986 – 1997	Hawthorn	194 (27)
- ^{1} Playing statistics correct to the end of 1997.

Career highlights
- Premiership - 1991 Became a Life Member - 1993

Ray Jencke (born 25 March 1966) is a former Australian rules footballer who played for Hawthorn Football Club.

== Early life and family ==
Jencke is originally from Pakenham, Victoria. He is the son of Norman and Janet Jencke. His older sister, Roselee Jencke, is a former Australia netball international. His niece, Macy Gardner, is also a netball player.

== Playing career ==
Jencke debuted for Hawthorn Football Club in 1986, playing 6 games in his first year. He played in the losing 1987 grand final. In 1991, Jencke played all 24 games, kicking a total of 5 goals. He also played in his first Premiership team and walked away with a victory against the West Coast Eagles. The final took place at Waverley Park, with a crowd of 75,231. Jencke played on Chris Waterman, it was also Waterman’s first grand final. Hawks ended up winning by 53 points and the Norm Smith medal went to Paul Dear. He continued to play through mid nineties, before retiring at the end of the 1997 season.
