= Netball Victoria =

Netball governing body

- Sport: Netball
- Jurisdiction: Victoria
- Membership: 102,108
- Founded: 1928
- Affiliation: Netball Australia
- Headquarters: Melbourne Sports Centre – Parkville
- President: Carol Cathcart
- CEO: Steven Gatt (interim)

Official website
- vic.netball.com.au

Netball Victoria is the governing body for netball in Victoria, Australia. It is affiliated to Netball Australia. It is responsible for organising and managing the elite level team, Melbourne Vixens, who compete in the Suncorp Super Netball. It is also responsible for organising and managing the Victorian Netball League as well as numerous other leagues and competitions for junior and youth teams. Its headquarters are based at the Melbourne Sports Centre – Parkville.

== History ==
Netball is believed to have been played in Victorian primary schools by 1913 and in Victorian high schools by 1915. In 1922, Louise Mills and Nonie Hardie wanted to play netball competitively. The pair, who worked for the YWCA, called a meeting for girls interested in playing. From there, the Melbourne Girls' Basketball Association was formed. Games started in May 1923 with six teams competing. By the next year, there were twelve teams. In 1928, the Melbourne Girls' Basketball Association transformed into the Victorian Women's Basketball Association (VWBA). They subsequently organised a team to compete in the first Australian National Netball Championships, which were held in Melbourne in September 1928. Victoria won the inaugural event. In 1970, the VWBA changed its name to the Victorian Netball Association.

== Representative teams ==
=== Current ===
Team	Leagues	Years
Melbourne Vixens	Suncorp Super Netball; ANZ Championship	2017– 2008–2016
Victorian Fury	Australian Netball League	2008–
Under-19, Under-17	Australian National Netball Championships	

=== Former ===
Team	Leagues	Years
Victorian Flames	Australian Netball League	2013–2014
Melbourne Phoenix	Commonwealth Bank Trophy	1997–2007
Melbourne Kestrels	Commonwealth Bank Trophy	1997–2007

== Competitions ==
- Victorian Netball League
- Regional Victorian Netball League
- State Titles
- Association Championships
- Schools' Championship

== Netball Victoria Board ==
Notable board members

Members	Years
Jenny Borlase	
Joyce Brown	
Lorna McConchie	President, 1955–58, 1969–70, and 1980–81
Kate Palmer	Chief Executive, 2000–2006

== Team of the 20th Century ==
Player	Years	Position
Myrtle Baylis	1937–1954	GA
Alice Doyle	1947–1948	GD
Pat McCarthy	1950s	
Wilma Shakespear	1960s	
Sharelle McMahon	1997–2012	GA, GS
Shelley O'Donnell	1987–2005	WA, C
Margaret Caldow	1961–1979	GA
Joyce Brown	1958–1963	GA, GS
Dorothy Close	1950s	
Lorna McConchie	1931–1940	GA, GS
Simone McKinnis	1980s–1990s	WD
Stella Northey		
Jan Cross		
