= Simone Nalatu =

Fijian-Australian netball player

Personal information
- Born: Simone Taraivosa Nalatu; 21 March 1980 (age 46) Redcliffe, Queensland, Australia
- Occupation: Public health administrator
- Height: 1.75 m (5 ft 9 in)
- University: Griffith University

Netball career
- Playing positions: C, WD
Years	Club team	Apps
2008	Queensland Fusion	
2005–07	Queensland Firebirds	
Years	National team	Caps
2006–07	Fiji	
- Updated on 15 April 2018

Simone Taraivosa Nalatu (born 21 March 1980) is a Fijian Australian netball player.

== Biography ==
Born in Redcliffe, Queensland, Nalatu's parents also represented Fiji in sports, with her father, Kini, a member of the Fiji national rugby union team and her mother, Faith, a member of the Fiji women's national field hockey team. Naltu commenced competing, aged eight years; and was a member of the Fijian national team that played at the 2007 Netball World Championships.

Nalatu studied at Griffith University and completed her PhD in 2012, studying the physical activity patterns of Aboriginal mothers and the factors that influence participation.

She also played for the Queensland Firebirds in the Commonwealth Bank Trophy from 2004 to 2007. In 2008 and 2009 Nalatu was selected for the Queensland Fusion in the inaugural Australian Netball League where she captained the side. Nalatu plays for the Suncoast Lynx in the Holden Cruze Cup (the Queensland State League).
