= Macy Gardner =

Australian netball player

Personal information
- Born: c. 2000 (age 25–26) Melbourne; Victoria, Australia
- Relatives: Roselee Jencke (mother); Ray Jencke (uncle)
- School: All Hallows' School
- University: Griffith University

Netball career
- Playing positions: C, WA
| Years | Club team | Apps |
| 201x– | Brisbane North Cougars | |
| 2018–2019 | Queensland Fusion | |
| 2019–2020 | Queensland Firebirds | |
| 2021 | Queensland Sapphires | |

Macy Gardner is an Australian netball player who has played for Queensland Firebirds in Suncorp Super Netball and for Queensland Fusion in the Australian Netball League.

== Early life, education and family ==
Gardner is originally from Victoria but moved to Queensland when her mother, Roselee Jencke, was appointed head coach of Queensland Firebirds. Her uncle, Ray Jencke, is a former Australian rules footballer. Between 2013 and 2017 Gardner attended All Hallows' School and between 2018 and 2021 she attended Griffith University.

== Playing career ==
=== Queensland ===
Gardner has represented Queensland at both under-17 and under-19 levels in the Australian National Netball Championships. In 2019 she was named the MVP in the under-19 tournament.

=== Queensland Fusion ===
In 2016 and 2017 Gardner was named as a Queensland Fusion training partner. In 2018 and 2019 season she played for Fusion in the Australian Netball League.

=== Queensland Firebirds ===
On 27 July 2019 Gardner made her debut for Queensland Firebirds in a 2019 Suncorp Super Netball Round 10 match against Sunshine Coast Lightning. In an eight minute appearance she made four goal assists and six feeds and intercepted a Laura Langman pass. She was subsequently included in the Firebirds squad for the 2020 Suncorp Super Netball season.
