= Doug Anderson (Australian footballer) =

Australian rules footballer

Personal information
- Full name: Douglas Charles Richard Anderson
- Born: 21 September 1903; Tatura, Victoria
- Died: 27 March 1999 (aged 95); Montrose, Victoria
- Height: 180 cm (5 ft 11 in)

Playing career^{1}
Years	Club	Games (Goals)
1925–1926	Fitzroy	8 (2)
- ^{1} Playing statistics correct to the end of 1926.

Douglas Charles Richard Anderson (21 September 1903 – 27 March 1999) was an Australian rules footballer who played with Fitzroy in the Victorian Football League (VFL).

== Family ==
Anderson is the father of Joyce Brown, the former Australia netball international and national team head coach, and grandfather of Fraser Brown, who played for Carlton during the 1990s.
