= Joyce Brown (netball) =

Australian netball player and coach

Joyce Brown OAM
Personal information
- Full name: Joyce Alice Brown (Née: Anderson)
- Born: 29 September 1938 (age 88) Victoria, Australia
- Children: Fraser Brown
- Relative: Doug Anderson (father)
- University: University of Melbourne

Netball career
- Playing positions: GA, GS ?
Years	Club team	Apps
1958–1963	Victoria	
Years	National team	Caps
1963	Australia	9
Coaching career
- Years: Team
- 1972–1975: Victoria
- 1975: Australia
- 1979: Victoria
- 1983–1993: Australia
- 1999–2002: Melbourne Phoenix
Medal record
Representing Australia
World Netball Tournament
Gold medal – first place	1963 Eastbourne	Team

Joyce Alice Brown (née Anderson) OAM (born 29 September 1938) is a former Australia netball international and national team head coach. Brown captained Australia at the inaugural 1963 World Netball Tournament, winning a gold medal. She later coached Australia at the 1975, 1983 and 1991 World Netball Championships and at the 1993 World Games, guiding the team to four gold medals. Brown never lost a Netball World Cup match, either as a player or coach. In 1992 she was awarded the Medal of the Order of Australia. Between 1999 and 2002, Brown served as head coach of Melbourne Phoenix in the Commonwealth Bank Trophy league, leading them to the premiership in 2000 and 2002. Brown also served as a netball umpire and sports administrator.

== Early life, family and education ==
Brown is the daughter of Doug Anderson, who during the 1920s played Australian rules football for Fitzroy. In her youth, Brown played tennis, before taking up netball in primary school. She graduated from the University of Melbourne as a physical education teacher. Together with her husband, Colin, she lived in Mooroolbark. Their son, Fraser Brown, played Australian rules football for Carlton during the 1990s.

== Playing career ==
=== Victoria ===
Between 1958 and 1963, Brown played for Victoria in the Australian National Netball Championships. In 2000, together with Sharelle McMahon, Wilma Shakespear, Myrtle Baylis, Shelley O'Donnell and Simone McKinnis, Brown was named in Netball Victoria's Team of the Century.

=== Australia ===
Brown captained Australia at the inaugural 1963 World Netball Tournament, winning a gold medal. The team was coached by Lorna McConchie and also featured Wilma Shakespear. Brown made all her nine senior appearances for Australia at the 1963 tournament.

Tournaments	Place
1963 World Netball Tournament	1st place, gold medalist(s)

== Coaching career ==
=== Victoria ===
Between 1972 and 1975 and again in 1979, Brown coached Victoria in the Australian National Netball Championships.

=== Australia ===
Brown coached Australia at the 1975, 1983 and 1991 World Netball Championships and at the 1993 World Games, guiding the team to four goal medals. In 1992 Brown, along with the rest of the gold medal-winning 1991 World Netball Championship squad, were awarded the Medal of the Order of Australia. In 2008, Brown was inducted into the Australian Netball Hall of Fame.

Tournaments	Place
1975 World Netball Tournament	1st place, gold medalist(s)
1983 World Netball Tournament	1st place, gold medalist(s)
1991 World Netball Championships	1st place, gold medalist(s)
1993 World Games	1st place, gold medalist(s)

=== Melbourne Phoenix ===
Between 1999 and 2002, Brown served as head coach of Melbourne Phoenix in the Commonwealth Bank Trophy league, leading them to the premiership in 2000.

== Umpire and administrator ==
Brown has also served as a netball umpire and sports administrator. She has served as a board member of the Australian Institute of Sport, the Confederation of Australian Sport, Netball Victoria and Netball Australia.

== Joyce Brown Coach of the Year ==
In 2014 Netball Australia introduced the Joyce Brown Coach of the Year award. Past winners have included Roselee Jencke, Lisa Alexander, Simone McKinnis and Stacey Marinkovich.

== Honours ==
=== Player ===
Australia

- World Netball Tournament
  - Winners: 1963

=== Head coach ===
Australia

- World Netball Tournament
  - Winners: 1975, 1983, 1991
- World Games
  - Winners: 1993

Melbourne Phoenix

- Commonwealth Bank Trophy
  - Winners: 2000

=== Individual awards ===
Year	Award
1961	AA Umpires Award
1981	AA Service Award
1981	Netball Victoria Life Membership
1989	Sport Australia Hall of Fame
1992	Medal of the Order of Australia
2000	Netball Victoria Hall of Fame
2000	Australian Sports Medal
2001	Centenary Medal
2001	Victorian Honour Roll of Women.
2008	Australian Netball Hall of Fame

== Bibliography ==
- Brown, Joyce (1971) [First published 1966]. Netball Playing and Coaching. Melbourne: Cheshire.
- Brown, Joyce (1978). Netball the Australian Way. Lilydale, Victoria: J. Brown. ISBN 0959616608.
- Brown, Joyce; Harris, John (1988). Netball Skills. Sydney: Doubleday. ISBN 0868243124.
