= Myrtle Baylis =

Australian sportswomen

Personal information
- Full name: Myrtle Baylis (Née: Craddock)
- Born: 1 May 1920 Footscray, Melbourne, Victoria
- Died: 23 September 2014 (aged 94)

Netball career
- Playing position: GA
| Years | Club team | Apps |
| 1937–1954 | Victoria | |
| Years | National team | Caps |
| 1948–1954 | Australia | 3 |

Myrtle Baylis (1 May 1920 – 23 September 2014), also known as Myrtle Craddock, was an Australia women's Test cricketer and an Australia netball international. In 1948 she made her debut for both national teams, just five months apart. Between 1948 and 1951 she played in six cricket tests for the Australia women's national cricket team. Between 1948 and 1954 she made three appearances for the Australia national netball team. In 1953 she also captained the Australia netball team. According to Netball Victoria, she was the first woman to represent Australia in two sports.

== Early life ==
Baylis was the daughter of Johnny Craddock, who during the late 1910s and 1920s played Australian rules football for Western Bulldogs. His "bulldog tenacity" was said to have inspired the club nickname. Myrtle was raised in Sunshine, Melbourne and was still a resident of the suburb when she died in 2014.

== Playing career ==
Myrtle Baylis
Cricket information
- Batting: Left-handed
- Bowling: Left-arm medium Slow left-arm wrist-spin
- Role: Bowler

International information
- National side: Australia
- Test debut (cap 30): 20 March 1948 v New Zealand
- Last Test: 3 June 1951 v England

Domestic team information
- Years: Team
- 1945–195x: Victoria

Career statistics
| Competition | Test |
|---|---|
| Matches | 6 |
| Runs scored | 22 |
| Batting average | 7.33 |
| 100s/50s | 0/0 |
| Top score | 9* |
| Balls bowled | 1242 |
| Wickets | 16 |
| Bowling average | 19.62 |
| 5 wickets in innings | 0 |
| 10 wickets in match | 0 |
| Best bowling | 4/95 |
| Catches/stumpings | 3/– |
- Source: ESPNcricinfo

=== Cricket ===
Victoria

Baylis made her debut for Victoria during the 1945–46 season.

Australia

Between 1948 and 1951, Baylis played in six cricket tests for Australia. She made her Test debut on 20 March 1948 against New Zealand during the 1947–48 tour. She was the 30th Australian woman Test cricketer to be capped. Baylis was described by Wisden as a bowler of "unwavering patience and accuracy". She made her last test appearance on 3 June 1951 against England.

=== Netball ===
Victoria

Baylis represented Victoria between 1937 and 1954. She later recalled cycling from her home in Sunshine to Royal Park for training each Sunday. In 2000, together with Sharelle McMahon, Wilma Shakespear, Joyce Brown, Shelley O'Donnell and Simone McKinnis, Baylis was named in Netball Victoria's Team of the Century.

Australia

Between 1948 and 1954, Baylis made three appearances for Australia. She made her senior debut on 14 August 1948 in a 27–16 win against New Zealand at Forbury Park. This was just the second-ever netball international between Australia and New Zealand. It was also part of Australia's first-ever international tour. In 1953 she also captained Australia. In 2012, Baylis was inducted into the Australian Netball Hall of Fame.
