= Sharon Finnan =

Australia netball international

Sharon Finnan-White OAM OAM
Personal information
- Full name: Sharon Louise Finnan-White OAM (Née: Finnan)
- Born: 7 September 1967 (age 58) Surry Hills, New South Wales
- Occupations: Founder & CEO First Nations Academy of Excellence
- Spouse: Dr. Andrew White (Paediatrician)
- Children: 2
- School: St Joseph's Girls High School, Kogarah, NSW

Netball career
- Playing position: GD/WD
| Years | Club team | Apps |
| Years | National team | Caps |
| 1990–2000 | Australia | 20 |
Medal record
Representing Australia
Netball World Championships
| Gold medal – first place | 1991 Sydney | Netball |
| Gold medal – first place | 1999 Christchurch | Netball |
- Updated on 30 September 2020

Sharon Louise Finnan-White OAM (née Finnan, born 7 September 1967) is a former Australian netball player and a two-time winner of the Netball World Cup with the Australian national netball team.

Finnan was born in the inner-Sydney suburb of Surry Hills, New South Wales. She played for the New South Wales Under-21 and Open team from 1988–1997 and was invited to attend the Australian Institute of Sport program in 1988. She was first selected to play for the national team in the 1990 Commonwealth Games and retired from netball in 2000.

As of 2015, Finnan-White lives in Townsville.

In the 1992 Queen's Birthday Honours list, she was awarded the Medal of the Order of Australia. In 2000, she was awarded the Australian Sports Medal for services to netball development.
