= Meegan Rooney =

Australian netball player

Personal information
- Born: 18 February 1984 (age 42)
- Height: 1.84 m (6 ft 0 in)

Netball career
- Playing positions: GK, GD, WD
Years	Club team	Apps
2003, 05–08	Queensland Firebirds	
- Updated on 2009-05-26

Meegan Rooney (born 18 February 1984) is an Australian netball player. Rooney played for the Queensland Firebirds in the Commonwealth Bank Trophy (2003, 2005–07) and in the ANZ Championship (2008).
