= Roselee Jencke =

Australian netball player and coach

Roselee Jencke OAM
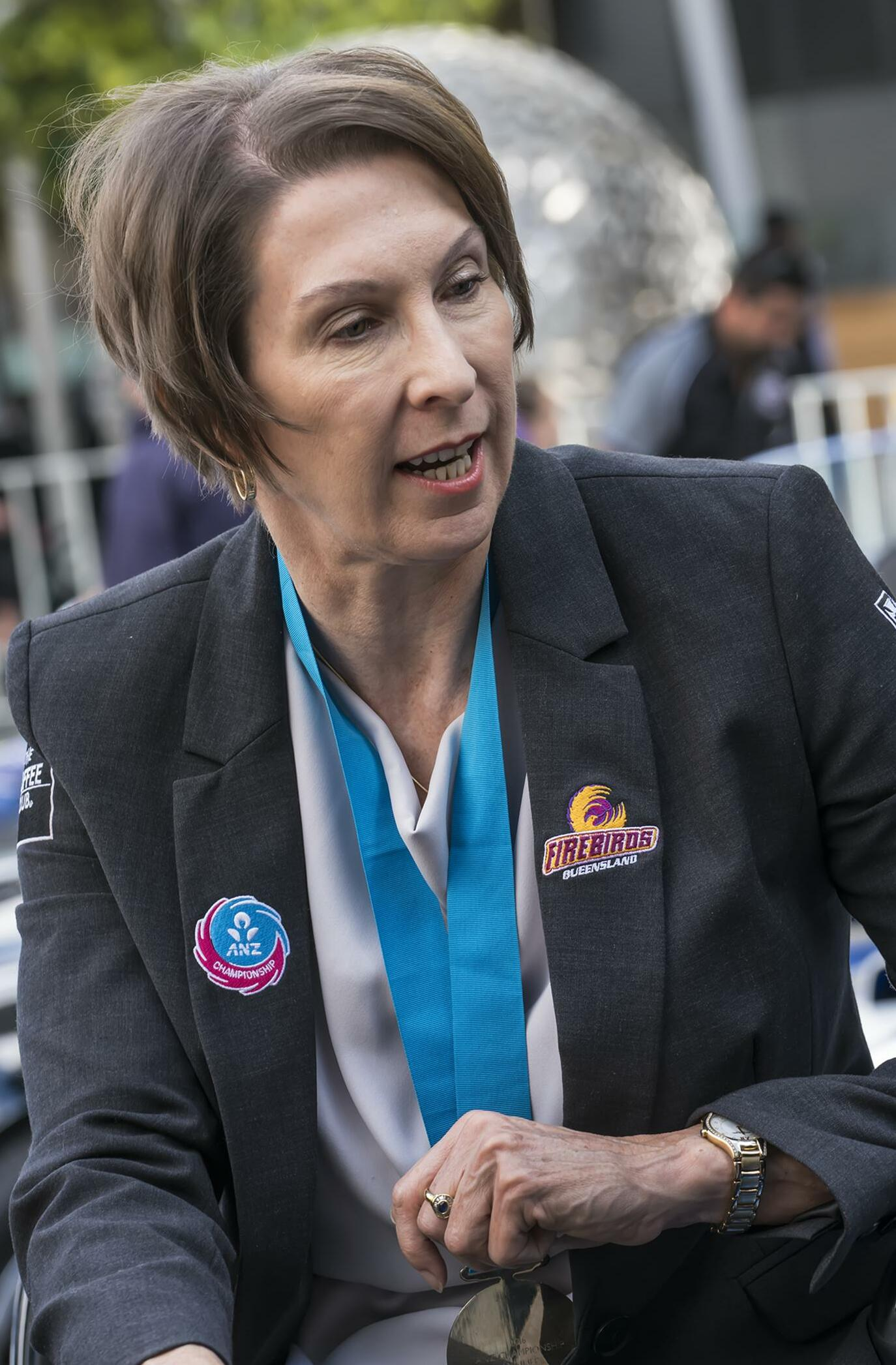

Personal information
- Full name: Roselee Joy Gwendoline Jencke
- Born: c. 1965 (age 60–61) Victoria, Australia
- Children: Macy Gardner
- Relative: Ray Jencke (brother)
- School: Pakenham Secondary College

Netball career
- Playing position: GK
Years	Club team	Apps
1982–1983	AIS	
1990s	Melbourne Blues	
1990	→ Melbourne City	
1993–1996	Melbourne Pumas	
Years	National team	Caps
1985–1992	Australia	43
Coaching career
- Years: Team
- 2009–2020: Queensland Firebirds
Medal record
Representing Australia
World Netball Championships
Gold medal – first place	1991 Sydney	Team
Silver medal – second place	1987 Glasgow	Team
World Games
Silver medal – second place	1985 London	Team

Roselee Jencke is a former Australia netball international and netball coach. As a player, Jencke was a member of the Australia teams that won the gold medal at the 1991 World Netball Championships and the silver medals at the 1985 World Games and the 1987 World Netball Tournament. In 1992 she was awarded the Medal of the Order of Australia. Between 2009 and 2020, Jencke served as head coach of Queensland Firebirds. Between 2011 and 2016 she guided Firebirds to five ANZ Championship grand finals, winning three premierships in 2011, 2015 and 2016.

== Early life, education and family ==
Jencke is originally from Pakenham, Victoria. She is the daughter of Norman and Janet Jencke. Her younger brother, Ray Jencke, is a former Australian rules footballer. She attended Pakenham Secondary College. She is married to Paul Gardner. Her daughter, Macy Gardner, is also a netball player and made her Suncorp Super Netball debut for Queensland Firebirds in 2019.

== Playing career ==
=== AIS ===
Between 1982 and 1983 Jencke played for the Australian Institute of Sport where she was coached by Wilma Shakespear and Gaye Teede.

=== Esso/Mobil Superleague ===
During the Esso/Mobil Superleague era, Jencke played for Melbourne City and Melbourne Pumas. In 1990 she played for Melbourne City, a composite team coached by Norma Plummer that also featured Simone McKinnis and Shelley O'Donnell. Melbourne City finished as champions after defeating Adelaide Contax 52–42 in the grand final. In 1993 Jencke captained a Melbourne Pumas team with McKinnis as vice-captain and with Norma Plummer as coach. Jencke was still a member of the Pumas squad in 1996.

=== Australia ===
Between 1985 and 1992 Jencke made 43 senior Test appearances for Australia. In 1984 she had captained the Australia under-21 team. She made her senior debut on 1 February 1985 against New Zealand. She was subsequently a member of the Australia teams that won the silver medals at the 1985 World Games and the 1987 World Netball Tournament. Jencke was also a prominent member of the Australia team that won the gold medal at the 1991 World Netball Championships. In the final she made a match-saving intercept in the final minute to ensure a one-goal victory for Australia. Chronic back pain forced her to retire from the national team in 1993. In 1992 Jencke, along with the rest of the gold medal-winning squad, was awarded the Medal of the Order of Australia.

Tournaments	Place
1985 World Games	2nd place, silver medalist(s)
1987 World Netball Tournament	2nd place, silver medalist(s)
1991 World Netball Championships	1st place, gold medalist(s)

== Coaching career ==
=== Assistant coach ===
Club level

After a back injury kept her sidelined for much of the 1997 Commonwealth Bank Trophy season with Melbourne Kestrels, Lisa Alexander employed Jencke as an assistant coach. In 2000 she also served as an assistant coach with Melbourne Phoenix. In 2005 she also served as an assistant coach with AIS Canberra Darters.

Australia

Jencke has also been a selector, assistant coach and specialist coach with Australia. She served as an assistant coach with the Australia under-21 team that won a bronze medal at the 2005 World Youth Netball Championships. She was also an assistant coach with the 2007 senior squad. Between 2015 and 2018 she served as Lisa Alexander's assistant/defensive specialist.

=== Queensland Firebirds ===
In 2009 Jencke was appointed head coach of Queensland Firebirds. Between 2011 and 2016 she guided Firebirds to five ANZ Championship grand finals and three premierships. At the end of the 2020 Suncorp Super Netball season, Jencke announced she was stepping down as Firebirds head coach.

	Grand finals	Place	Opponent
1	2011	Winners	Northern Mystics
2	2013	Runners up	Adelaide Thunderbirds
3	2014	Runners up	Melbourne Vixens
4	2015	Winners	New South Wales Swifts
5	2016	Winners	New South Wales Swifts

== Honours ==
=== Player ===
Australia

- World Netball Championships
  - Winners: 1991
  - Runners Up: 1987
- World Games
  - Runners Up: 1985

Melbourne City

- Esso Super League
  - Winners: 1990

=== Coach ===
Queensland Firebirds

- ANZ Championship
  - Winners: 2011, 2015, 2016
  - Runners Up: 2013, 2014

=== Individual awards ===
Year	Award
1992	Medal of the Order of Australia
2011	ANZ Championship All Star Coach
2011	Australian ANZ Championship Coach of the Year
2014	Joyce Brown Coach of the Year
2015	Australian ANZ Championship Coach of the Year
2016	Australian ANZ Championship Coach of the Year
