= Netball Australia =

Netball governing body

- Sport: Netball
- Jurisdiction: Australia
- Abbreviation: NA
- Founded: 1927
- Affiliation: World Netball
- Headquarters: Melbourne, Victoria
- Chairperson: Liz Ellis
- CEO: Mark Falvo

Official website
- netball.com.au

Netball Australia is the main governing body for netball in Australia. It is affiliated to World Netball. It is responsible for organising and administering the Australia national netball team, Suncorp Super Netball, Australian National Netball Championships, and the Australian Netball Championships. It previously organised and administered the ANZ Championship, the Commonwealth Bank Trophy league and the Esso/Mobil Superleague.

Netball Australia was originally founded in 1927 as the All Australia Women's Basket Ball Association. In 1970, after "women's basket ball" became known as netball, the organisation changed its name to the All Australia Netball Association. It adopted its current name in 1993.

== History ==
Netball Australia was founded on 26/27 August 1927 as the All Australia Women's Basket Ball Association during an interstate women's basketball carnival. Its founding members included the Sydney City Girls' Amateur Sports Association (New South Wales), the Australian Ladies Basket Ball Association (Queensland), the South Australian Women's Basket Ball Association (South Australia), the Melbourne Girls Basket Ball Association (Victoria) and the Basket Ball Association of Perth (Western Australia). Tasmania began competing in national tournaments in 1933. The Australian Capital Territory and Northern Territory joined in 1975 and 1977 respectively. In 1970, after "women's basket ball" became known as netball, the organisation changed its name to the All Australia Netball Association. It adopted its current name in 1993.

Amid a funding crisis where Netball Australia lost A$7 million over two COVID-impacted years, in 2022 the organisation announced that it had secured Hancock Prospecting as high performance program partner from 2022 to 2025, with an investment of A$15 million over four years. Netball Australia announced that Hancock would invest directly in the Diamonds’ athletes and coaches, and provide funding support for training camps and competitions. The Diamonds team was photographed in uniform bearing the Hancock Prospecting logo. It was later revealed that some players did not support Hancock Prospecting as a sponsor due to historical comments made by the company's founder, Lang Hancock on indigenous issues and the company's record on environmental issues. The controversy led to the resignation of Netball Australia Chair, Marina Go, citing personal reasons; and the Diamonds refused to wear the sports uniform with Hancock Prospecting logo. Within a month of announcing the sponsorship deal, Hancock Prospecting withdrew their offer, saying it did not wish to add to netball's “disunity problems”. Hancock offered Netball Australia short-term funding until such time as a more permanent arrangement could be secured.

== Competitions ==
=== Current ===
Years	Competition
2017–	Suncorp Super Netball
1928–	Australian National Netball Championships
2008–	Australian Netball Championships

=== Former ===
Years	Competition
2008–2016	ANZ Championship
1997–2007	Commonwealth Bank Trophy
1985–1996	Esso/Mobil Superleague

== Australian Netball Awards ==
Netball Australia hosts the annual the Australian Netball Awards.

=== Current awards ===
As of 2024 the awards included:

- Liz Ellis Diamond
- Australian International Player of the Year
- Australian Netball Hall of Fame
- SSN Team of the Year
- SSN Player of the Year
- SSN Rookie of the Year
- Joyce Brown Coach of the Year
- Lorna McConchie Umpire of the Year (named for Lorna McConchie)
- Dr Eve Fesl First Nations Black Swans Award, established 2024, in honour of Eve Fesl; recognises a First Nations national team player who has "demonstrated high standards of integrity and high-performance behaviours, as well as significant cultural leadership";sponsored by the Confident Girls Foundation
- ANPA Heart of the Game Award, established 2024; recognises an SSN player "who embodies the spirit of the Australian Netball Association’s manifesto demonstrating exceptional commitment to netball, personal growth, community impact and positive influence"

=== Former awards ===
Former awards include:

- Australian ANZ Championship Coach of the Year
- Australian ANZ Championship Player of the Year

== Member organisations ==
- Netball Australian Capital Territory
- Netball New South Wales
- Netball Northern Territory
- Netball Queensland
- Netball South Australia
- Netball Tasmania
- Netball Victoria
- Netball Western Australia

== Board ==
=== Presidents ===
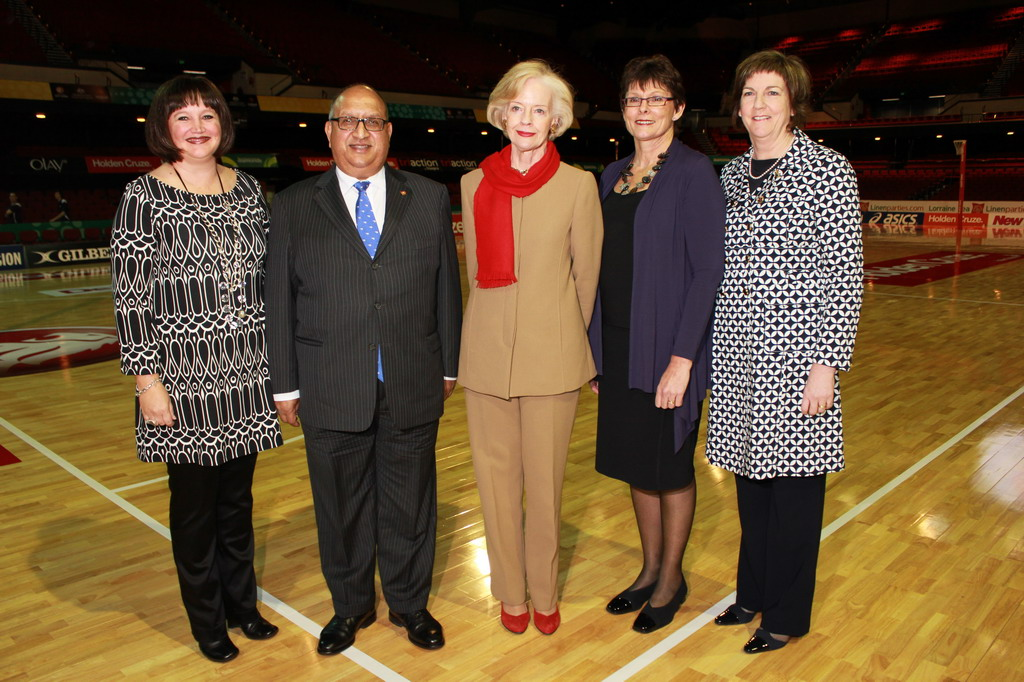
29 August 2010; Before the first test match of the 2010 Constellation Cup series; (from left to right) Raelene Castle, CEO of Netball New Zealand, Rt Hon Sir Anand Satyanand, the Governor-General of New Zealand, Quentin Bryce AC, the Governor-General of Australia, Noeleen Dix, President of Netball Australia and Kate Palmer, CEO of Netball Australia.

Years	President
c. 1950s	Eunice Gill
1955	Anne Clark
1960	Anne Clark
1966	Anne Clark
1972	Anne Clark
1978	Anne Clark
1978–1988	Deirdre Hyland AM
1988–1995	Margaret Pewtress OAM
1995–2004	Sue Taylor
2004–2006	Marilyn Melhuish OAM
2006–2016	Noeleen Dix
2016–2019	Robert Shaw

== Notable people ==
=== Chief Executive Officers ===
Years	CEO
2004–2006	Lindsay Cane
2006–2016	Kate Palmer
2016–2020	Marne Fechner
2021–2023	Kelly Ryan
2023–2026	Stacey West
2026–	Mark Falvo

=== Notable directors ===
Season	Directors
1980–1983	Joyce Brown
2011–2013	Wilma Shakespear
2013–2017	Kathryn Harby-Williams
