= Netball Western Australia =

Netball governing body

- Jurisdiction: Western Australia
- Abbreviation: NWA
- Founded: 1920s
- Affiliation: Netball Australia
- Headquarters: State Netball Centre
- Location: 200 Selby Street; Jolimont, Western Australia
- CEO: Simone Hansen

Official website
- wa.netball.com.au

Netball Western Australia is the governing body for netball in Western Australia. It is affiliated to Netball Australia. It is responsible for organizing and managing West Coast Fever who compete in Suncorp Super Netball. It is also responsible for organizing and managing the West Australian Netball League as well as numerous other leagues and competitions for junior and youth teams.

== History ==
In 1927, an early incarnation of Netball Western Australia, the Basket Ball Association of Perth was a founder member of Netball Australia.

Its headquarters are based at the State Netball Centre in Jolimont, Western Australia.

== Representative teams ==
=== Current ===
Team	Leagues	Years
West Coast Fever	Suncorp Super Netball; ANZ Championship	2008–
Western Sting	Australian Netball Championships; Australian Netball League	2021– 2008–2019
Under-19, Under-17	Australian National Netball Championships	

=== Former ===
Team	Leagues	Years
Perth Orioles	Commonwealth Bank Trophy	1997–2007

== Competitions ==
- West Australian Netball League
- State Cup
- Regional Championships
- Association Championships
- Aboriginal Youth Gala Day
- Multicultural Carnival
