= Noor Dean =

Member of House of Representatives (Fiji) Labasa/Bua Indian Communal Constituency
- In office 1987–1987
- Preceded by: Mohammed Sadiq
- Succeeded by: Constitution abrogated

Personal details
- Born: Suva, Fiji
- Party: National Federation Party
- Profession: Lawyer

Noor Dean is an Indo-Fijian lawyer and politician who served in the Suva City Council and was elected to the House of Representatives of Fiji in 1987.

== Early life ==
He was born in Suva, Fiji in 1946, the oldest boy in a family of 12. His father, the late Rahmat Dean was a popular architect who designed the Toorak Mosque in Suva. He worked as a school teacher, and then became a lawyer after training as a Barrister at Gray's Inn.

== Political career ==
Dean served in the Suva City Council since 1972, representing the National Federation Party (NFP) and was elected Suva's Lord Mayor for the 1982–1983 term. Noor served the NFP as Branch Secretary, Youth Leader, National Organising Secretary and National Vice-president.

For the 1987 general election, the NFP-Labour Coalition chose him as a candidate for the Labasa/Bua Indian Communal Constituency which he won easily. He was elected the Deputy Speaker but was a member of Parliament for a month before the 1987 Fijian coups d'état ended his political career. He was detained by the military regime, but released after a few days in custody. He later claimed that the coup had been carried out not by Fijians, but by American mercenaries.

== Post-coup ==
After the coup he left Fiji and worked as a lawyer in Australia. He was a Partner in Victoria law firm, Buxton and Associates, and then Principal at MLC Lawyers in Melbourne. In 2006 he was found guilty of professional misconduct, fined $3000, and ordered to pay $13000 in compensation after failing to file a visa application for a client, resulting in them being classified as an illegal immigrant. In 2019 he was again found guilty of professional misconduct, and fined $8000.
