= Eunice Gill =

- Born: Eunice Elizabeth Perrott Gill; 5 January 1918; Armadale, Victoria
- Died: 4 December 1987 (aged 69); Canterbury, Victoria
- Education: University of Melbourne; University of Leeds
- Occupations: netball player and coach
- Employer: University of Melbourne

Eunice Elizabeth Perrott Gill (5 January 1918 – 4 December 1987) was an Australian international netballer, administrator, coach and academic. She studied and lectured at the University of Melbourne.

== Life ==
Gill was born in Armadale, Victoria in 1918. She attended the University of Melbourne where she was taught by Lorna McConchie and she gained a degree and diplomas in physical education and education. She excelled at netball which at the time was called women's basketball. In 1945-47 she was in Victoria's team and in 1948 she was in the Australia national netball team.

In 1960 she was the head coach of the Australia national netball team taking over from her mentor Lorna McConchie. McConchie returned after Gill.

At the 1967 World Netball Tournament, Gill was on the organising committee. The cup is contested every four years and Gill was the national delegate to the championships in 1967, 1970/71 and in 1979.

In 1975 she became a Member of the Order of the British Empire (MBE) for "services to sport (especially netball), recreation and physical education".

The Confederation of Australian Sport was established in 1976 to represent sport in Australia and Gill was a foundation member of the board. Gill led the Australian Sport Coaches Assembly and the Australian Coaching Council as chair. The council was responsible for accrediting 33,000 coaches in a range of sports.

Gill died in Canterbury, Victoria, in 1987. After her death an award for the sports administrator of the award in Victoria was created in her name.

== Sources ==
- Department of Sport, Recreation and Tourism; Australian Sport Commission (1985). Australian Sport, a profile. Canberra, Australia: Australian Government Publish Service. ISBN 0-644-03667-2.
