= Netball in Sri Lanka =

- Country: Sri Lanka
- National team: Sri Lanka

Netball was first played in Sri Lanka in 1921. The first game was played by Ceylon Girl Guide Company at Kandy High School. The first interschool march was played between Kandy High School and C.M.S. Ladies' College, Colombo in February 1925. In 1927, netball was played at Government Training College for the first time. This helped spread the game around Sri Lanka.

== History ==
The game was being played at Methodist College Colombo and Bishop's College by the 1930s. By 1952, Sri Lankan clubs were playing Indian club sides. In 1956, Sri Lanka played its first international match against Australia's national team in Sri Lanka. In 1972, the Netball Federation of Sri Lanka was created. In 1983, the Netball Federation of Sri Lanka was dissolved by the government.

England's record against Ceylon in international matches between 1949 and 1976 was one win.

Sri Lanka took part in the 1960 netball meeting of Commonwealth countries to try to standardize the rules for the game. This meeting took place in Sri Lanka.

Sri Lanka had a national team compete in the fifth Asian Netball Championships held in Colombo, Sri Lanka in 2001.

Sri Lanka competed in the 7th Asian Youth Netball Championship held in 2010 in India.

As of August 2016, the women's national team was ranked number twenty-seven in the world.

Some of the top performances for the Sri Lanka netball team include:

- 1967 Donald Windsor Challenge Shield: First
- 1985 Asian Netball Tournament: Second
- 1990 Asian Netball Tournament: First
- 1997 Asian Netball Tournament: First
- 2001 Asian Netball Tournament: First
- 2009 Asian Netball Tournament: First
- 2010 Asian Youth Netball Championship: Second
- 2012 Asian Netball Tournament: Second
- 2013 Asian Youth Netball Championship: Second
- 2014 Asian Netball Tournament: Second
- 2015 Asian Youth Netball Championship: First
- 2016 Asian Netball Tournament: Second
- 2017 Asian Youth Netball Championship: Fourth
- 2018 Asian Netball Tournament: First
- 2019 Asian Youth Netball Championship: Third
- 2022 Asian Netball Tournament: First

The table below contains a list of all the presidents and secretaries of the Netball Federation of Sri Lanka.

| Year | President | Secretary |
| 1954 | Dr. H.S.R. Gunawardena | Miss H.I. Perera |
| 1956 | Mr. A.G.G. Perera | Miss H.I. Perera |
| 1958 | Mr. Dinkar Muthukrishna | Miss Kusuma Gunawardena |
| 1959 | Mr. Dinkar Muthukrishna | Mr. A.K. de Alwis |
| 1960 | Mr. Dinkar Muthukrishna | Miss H.I. Perera |
| 1962 April | Ms. M. Ratwatte | Miss H.I. Perera |
| 1962 October | Ms. Anula Udalagama | Miss H.I. Perera |
| 1967 | Ms. Anula Udalagama | Miss Seetha Senevirathne |
| 1972 | Ms. Anula Udalagama | Ms. B.N. de Silva Malikka |
| 1973 | Ms. Nimal Perera | Ms. B.N. de Silva Malikka |
| 1974 June | Ms. Barbara Gunasekera | Ms. Jean de Silva |
| 1976 October | Ms. Seetha Wickramasinghe | Ms. Dulcie Kuruppu |
| 1978 | Ms. R.S.E. Perera | Ms. Carmen Siriwardane |
| 1979 | Ms. R.S.E. Perera | Ms. Dulcie Kuruppu |
| 1980 | Ms. R.S.E. Perera | Ms. Dulcie Kuruppu |
| 1981 | Ms. Trixie Jayasooriya | Ms. Dulcie Kuruppu |
| 1982/83 | Miss M. Francke | Ms. Dulcie Kuruppu |
| 1983 | Ms. Anula Udalagama (Board) | Ms. Monica de Silva |
| 1984 | Ms. Anula Udalagama (Board) | Ms. Monica de Silva |
| 1985 to 1989 | Ms. Anula Udalagama | Ms. Mallika de Silva |
| 1990 / 1991 | Ms. Manel Samaraweera | Ms. Dulcie Kuruppu |
| 1992 / 1993 | Ms. Prema Bandara | Ms. Yasmin Dharmaratne |
| 1993 / 1994 | Ms. Manel Samaraweera | Ms. Latha Senanayake |
| 1994 | Ms. Cynthia Rasquinho | Ms. Lourdes Jayasekara |
| 1995 | Ms. Lily Weerasinghe (Board) | Ms. Yasmin Dharmaratne |
| 1996 | Ms. Tamara Dharmakeerthi – Herath | Ms. Lourdes Jayasekara |
| 1997 | Ms. Tamara Dharmakeerthi - Herath | Ms. Lourdes Jayasekara |
| 1998 | Ms. Tamara Dharmakeerthi - Herath | Ms. June Perera |
| 1999 | Ms. Tamara Dharmakeerthi – Herath | Ms. Shirlene Van Sanden |
| 2001 | Ms. Trixie Nanayakkara | Col. Udala Krishnaratne |
| 2002 | Ms. Tamara Dharmakeerthi – Herath | Ms. Anoma Jayawardene (Board) |
| 2003/2004 | Ms. Tamara Dharmakeerthi – Herath | Ms. Yasmin Dharmaratne |
| 2004/2005 | Madam Shiranthi Rajapaksa | Ms. Yasmin Dharmaratne |
| 2005/2006 | Ms. Tamara Dharmakeerthi – Herath | Ms. Yasmin Dharmaratne |
| 2006 March/2008 August | Ms. Sherine Kumaranathunga | Ms. Rio Ramlan |
| 2008 August/2010 May | Ms. Ajanta Wijesekara | Ms. Trixie Nanayakkara |
| 2010 May (At Present) | Mrs. Leisa de Silva Chandrasena | Ms. Damayanthi Jayathilaka |

2013 March - 2014 March MsVictoria Lakshimi Ms Shyama Coora

== Bibliography ==
- All England Netball Association (1976). Golden jubilee : 1926–1976. All England Netball Association. OCLC 39500756.
- Government of Sri Lanka (21 July 2001). "5th Asian Netball Championship next week in Colombo". Archived from the original on 26 January 2004.
- International Federation of Netball Associations (21 January 2011a). "Current World Rankings". Archived from the original on 19 May 2011.
- International Federation of Netball Associations (15 June 2008). "History of Netball". Archived from the original on 6 March 2011.
- Lanka Journal (29 June 2009). "Sri Lanka clinch Asian Netball Title". Archived from the original on 6 March 2011.
- Lanka Truth (29 June 2009). "Sri Lanka wins Asian Netball Championship".
- Sagar, Naresh (4 July 2010). "Asian Youth Netball Championship". Sagar Media. Archived from the original on 15 July 2011.
- Sri Lanka Netball (30 September 2010). "THE HISTORY OF NETBALL IN SRI LANKA". Archived from the original on 6 March 2011.
