= Anne Sargeant =

Australian netball player

Anne Sargeant OAM
Personal information
- Full name: Anne Elizabeth Sargeant
- Born: 28 December 1957 (age 68)
- University: University of Sydney

Netball career
- Playing position: Shooter
Years	National team	Caps
1978–88	Australia	
Medal record
Representing Australia
World Netball Tournament
Silver medal – second place	1987 Glasgow	Team
Gold medal – first place	1983 Singapore	Team
Gold medal – first place	1979 Trinidad & Tobago	Team
- Updated on 2015-6-24

Anne Sargeant, OAM (born 28 December 1957) is a retired Australian netball player and current sports commentator. Sargeant played in the Australian national team from 1978 to 1988, captaining the side for six years.

After her retirement from competitive netball, Sargeant has had a successful career as a columnist, motivational speaker and sports commentator, and also runs a netball program for young players. Sargeant's representations have included the Australian Sports Commission, the NSW Australia Day Council, Children's Week, Board Member of McDonald's, School Sport 2000 Committee and Patron of the 1994 Year of the Coach.

In 2008 she was a commentator for Fox Sports - ANZ Championship coverage. Sargeant also has been a commentator at various Netball World Cup tournaments and returned to commentate the 2013 and 2014 ANZ Championship seasons. Sargeant is also current selector for the Australian National team.

== Recognition ==
- 1987 – Athlete member of the Sport Australia Hall of Fame
- 1988 – NSW Hall of Champions.
- 1988 – Medal of the Order of Australia for service to netball.
- 2000 – Australian Sports medal.
- 2004 – Sydney's Greatest Ever Netballer.
- 2008 – One of the first inductees into the Australian Netball Hall of Fame
- 2015 – Legend member of the Sport Australia Hall of Fame
