= Simone McKinnis =

Australian netball player and coach

Simone McKinnis OAM
Personal information
- Full name: Simone Cecile McKinnis
- Born: 4 October 1965 Victoria, Australia

Netball career
- Playing position: WD
Years	Club team	Apps
1980s	Herne Hill	
1990s	Melbourne Blues	
1990	Melbourne City	
1993–1996	Melbourne Pumas	
1994	→ Adelaide Garville	
1997–1998	Melbourne Phoenix	
Years	National team	Caps
1986–1998	Australia	63
Coaching career
- Years: Team
- 2003–2007: Singapore Sports School
- 2007: AIS Canberra Darters
- 2008–2010: Australian Institute of Sport
- 2008–2009: → Australia U21
- 2010–2011: Tanzania
- 2012–: Melbourne Vixens
- 2012–: → Victorian Institute of Sport
Medal record
Representing Australia
World Netball Championships
Gold medal – first place	1991 Sydney	Team
Gold medal – first place	1995 Birmingham	Team
World Games
Gold medal – first place	1993 The Hague	Team
Commonwealth Games
Gold medal – first place	1998 Kuala Lumpur	Team

Simone McKinnis is a former Australia netball international and the former head coach of Melbourne Vixens in Suncorp Super Netball. As a player she was a member of the Australia teams that won gold medals at the 1991 and 1995 World Netball Championships, the 1993 World Games and the 1998 Commonwealth Games. She also captained the Melbourne Phoenix team that won the 1997 Commonwealth Bank Trophy. She was head coach when Vixens won the 2014 ANZ Championship and the 2020 Suncorp Super Netball titles. In 1992, McKinnis was awarded the Medal of the Order of Australia and in 2010 was inducted into the Australian Netball Hall of Fame.

== Early life and family ==
McKinnis is one of five sisters. The McKinnis family spent time in Western Australia and New South Wales before eventually settling in Geelong.

== Playing career ==
=== Early years ===
McKinnis began playing netball with Geelong-based Herne Hill. She later played for the Melbourne Club at Royal Park. She started in Melbourne Green, alongside Roselee Jencke, before progressing through Reds and Golds and eventually Melbourne Blues.

=== Esso/Mobil Superleague ===
During the Esso/Mobil Superleague era, McKinnis played for several teams. In 1990 she played for Melbourne City, a composite team coached by Norma Plummer that also featured Roselee Jencke and Shelley O'Donnell. Melbourne City finished as champions after defeating Adelaide Contax 52–42 in the grand final. In 1993 she was vice-captain of a Melbourne Pumas captained by Jencke and coached by Norma Plummer. In 1994 she played for Adelaide Garville as an "import player" and helped them reach the grand final. In 1995 and 1996, McKinnis played for Melbourne Pumas in two successive grand finals, finishing as winners in 1996. Her later Pumas team mates included Janine Ilitch, Eloise Southby and Ingrid Dick.

=== Melbourne Phoenix ===
In 1997 and 1998 McKinnis captained and played for Melbourne Phoenix in the Commonwealth Bank Trophy. In 1997 she was the league's MVP as Phoenix won the premiership.

=== Australia ===
Between 1986 and 1998 McKinnis made 63 test appearances for Australia. She was a member of the Australia teams that won gold medals at the 1991 and 1995 World Netball Championships, the 1993 World Games and the 1998 Commonwealth Games.

Tournaments	Place
1991 World Netball Championships	1st place, gold medalist(s)
1993 World Games	1st place, gold medalist(s)
1995 World Netball Championships	1st place, gold medalist(s)
1998 Commonwealth Games	1st place, gold medalist(s)

== Coaching career ==
=== Melbourne Phoenix ===
McKinnis began her senior coaching career with Melbourne Phoenix in the Commonwealth Bank Trophy, serving as assistant coach to Joyce Brown and then Lisa Alexander.

=== Singapore Sports School ===
Between 2003 and 2007 McKinnis served as head netball coach at the Singapore Sports School.

=== Australian Institute of Sport ===
Between 2007 and 2010 McKinnis served as head coach at the Australian Institute of Sport. During the 2007 season she coached AIS Canberra Darters in the Commonwealth Bank Trophy. She guided AIS to two successive Australian Netball League grand finals in 2008 and 2009. However on each occasion they lost to Victorian Fury.

=== Australia U21 ===
Between 2008 and 2009 McKinnis served as head coach of the Australia U21 team. She was head coach when Australia won the 2009 World Youth Netball Championships, defeating New Zealand U21 64–46 in the final after going undefeated throughout the tournament.

=== Tanzania ===
Between 2010 and 2011 McKinnis served as head coach of Tanzania. She subsequently guided them to third place at the 2010 Netball Singapore Nations Cup.

=== Melbourne Vixens ===
McKinnis joined the Melbourne Vixens coaching staff as a support/specialist coach for the 2012 ANZ Championship season. In September 2012 she was appointed Vixens head coach. She subsequently guided Vixens to the 2014 ANZ Championship and the 2020 Suncorp Super Netball titles. McKinnis was named the Joyce Brown Coach of the Year after Vixens were minor premiers in 2017 and again in 2020 after a second premiership. As part of her role as Vixens head coach, McKinnis also serves as head netball coach at the Victorian Institute of Sport.

== Sargeant–McKinnis Cup ==
The Sargeant–McKinnis Cup is awarded annually to the aggregate winner of the two Suncorp Super Netball matches between Melbourne Vixens and New South Wales Swifts. It is named in honour of McKinnis and Anne Sargeant. It was first introduced in 2004 during the Commonwealth Bank Trophy era. Sydney Swifts, Hunter Jaegers, Melbourne Phoenix and Melbourne Kestrels have previously competed for the trophy.

== Honours ==
=== Player ===
Australia

- World Netball Championships
  - Winners: 1991, 1995
- Commonwealth Games
  - Winners: 1998
- World Games
  - Winners: 1993

Melbourne Phoenix

- Commonwealth Bank Trophy
  - Winners: 1997

Melbourne City

- Esso Super League
  - Winners: 1990

Melbourne Pumas

- Mobil Super League
  - Runners up: 1995
  - Winners: 1996

=== Head coach ===
Melbourne Vixens

- Suncorp Super Netball
  - Winners: 2020
  - Winners: 2025
- ANZ Championship
  - Winners: 2014

Australia U21

- World Youth Netball Championships
  - Winners: 2009

Australian Institute of Sport

- Australian Netball League
  - Runners up: 2008, 2009

=== Individual awards ===
Year	Award
1992	Medal of the Order of Australia
2010	Australian Netball Hall of Fame
2014	Australian ANZ Championship Coach of the Year
2017, 2020	Joyce Brown Coach of the Year
