= Wilma Shakespear =

Australian netball player and coach

Wilma Shakespear AM
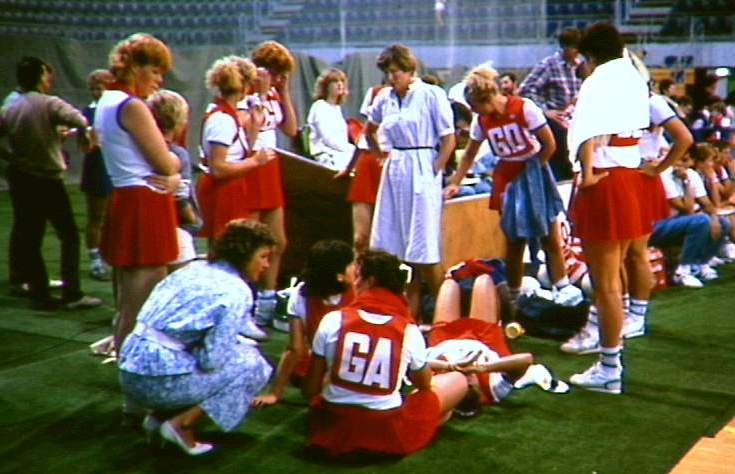
- Wilma Shakespear coaching the AIS netball team in 1986

Personal information
- Full name: Wilma Joyce Shakespear (Née: Ritchie)
- Born: 4 March 1943 (age 83) Victoria, Australia
- Spouse: Peter Shakespear

Netball career
Years	National team	Caps
1963	Australia	7
Coaching career
- Years: Team
- 197x–197x: Australia
- 1981–1990: Australian Institute of Sport
- 198x–198x: Australia
Medal record
Representing Australia
World Netball Tournament
Gold medal – first place	1963 Eastbourne	Team

Wilma Joyce Shakespear AM (born 4 March 1943), previously known as Wilma Ritchie, is a former Australia netball international, Australia head coach and sports administrator. As a player, she represented Australia at the 1963 World Netball Tournament, winning a gold medal. Shakespear coached Australia at the 1971, 1979 and 1987 World Netball Tournament and at the 1989 World Games. Shakespear also served as head netball coach at the Australian Institute of Sport. Shakespear is married to Peter Shakespear, a former Australian rower.

In the 1992 Australia Day Honours, Shakespear was appointed a Member of the Order of Australia (AM) "for service to sports, particularly netball." As a sports administrator she was the founding director of both the Queensland Academy of Sport and the English Institute of Sport. In 2010 she was inducted into the Australian Netball Hall of Fame.

== Playing career ==
As Wilma Ritchie, Shakespear represented Australia at the inaugural 1963 World Netball Tournament winning a gold medal. She made seven senior appearances for Australia.

== Coaching career ==
=== Australia ===
Shakespear coached Australia at the 1971, 1979 and 1987 World Netball Tournament and at the 1989 World Games. Under Shakespear, Australia were gold medalists in 1971 and 1979 and silver medalists in 1987 and 1989.

Tournaments	Place
1971 World Netball Tournament	1st place, gold medalist(s)
1979 World Netball Tournament	1st place, gold medalist(s)
1987 World Netball Tournament	2nd place, silver medalist(s)
1989 World Games	2nd place, silver medalist(s)

=== Australian Institute of Sport ===
Between 1981 and 1990, Shakespear served as head coach at the Australian Institute of Sport. She was the first head coach of the AIS netball program.

== Sports administrator ==
Position	Employer	Years
Manager	Australian Institute of Sport	1990–1991
Director	Queensland Academy of Sport	1991–
Director	English Institute of Sport	2001–2008
Director	Netball Australia	2011–2013

== Honours ==
=== Player ===
Australia

- World Netball Tournament
  - Winners: 1963

=== Head coach ===
Australia

- World Netball Tournament
  - Winners: 1971, 1979
  - Runners up: 1987
- World Games
  - Runners up: 1989

Individual

- Australian Netball Hall of Fame
  - Inducted: 2010
  - Elevated to Legend: 2021

== Bibliography ==
Wilma Shakespear, Margaret Caldow: Netball:Steps to Success (1979)
