= Australian Institute of Sport (netball) =

Defunct Australian netball team

- Founded: 1981
- Disbanded: 2013
- Based in: Canberra
- Region: Australian Capital Territory
- Home venue: AIS Arena
- League: Esso/Mobil Superleague; Commonwealth Bank Trophy; Australian Netball League; NSW State League; Victorian State League; South Australia State League
Uniform
Uniform

Australian Institute of Sport are a former Australian netball team based in Canberra, Australian Capital Territory. They were the netball team of the Australian Institute of Sport. They effectively acted as a development/under-21 team for the Australia national netball team. Between 1985 and 1996, AIS played in the Esso/Mobil Superleague. In 1985 and 1986 they finished as champions. Between 2003 and 2007, the AIS and Netball ACT entered a combined team known as AIS Canberra Darters in the Commonwealth Bank Trophy. Between 2008 and 2012, the AIS entered a separate team in the Australian Netball League. They were ANL grand finalists in both 2008 and 2009. They have also entered teams in the NSW State League, Victorian State League and the South Australia State League.

== History ==
=== Esso/Mobil Superleague ===
When the Australian Institute of Sport was established in 1981, netball was one of the eight original sports chosen to be part of the development program. Former Australia national netball team coach Wilma Shakespear was appointed the program's first head coach.

Between 1985 and 1996, AIS played in the Esso/Mobil Superleague. The league was formed as a partnership between the All Australia Netball Association and the AIS in order to provide the AIS team with more competitive matches. With a team coached by Shakespear and featuring Shelley Oates-Wilding and Vicki Wilson, AIS subsequently won the first two titles in 1985 and 1986. AIS also played in the 1987 and 1989 finals, losing to Melbourne Blues and Sydney Tigers respectively. Other AIS players from this era included Natalie Avellino, Sharon Finnan and Shelley O'Donnell. In 1990 Gaye Teede succeeded Shakespear as the program's head coach. Teede had served as assistant coach at the AIS since 1982. She remained as head coach until 1998.

Esso/Mobil Superleague placings

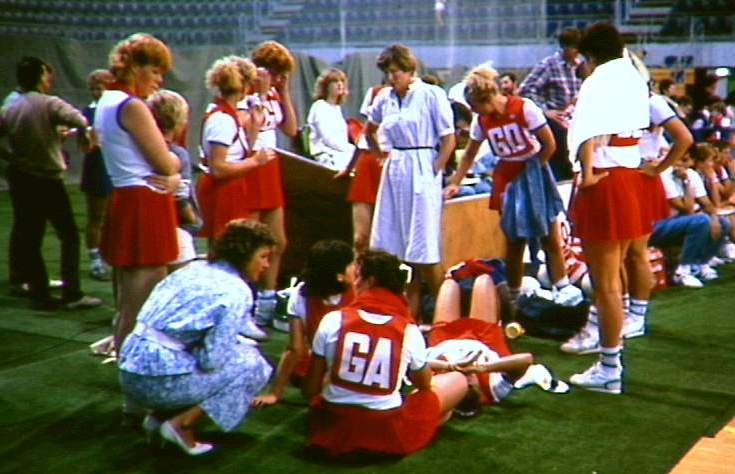
Wilma Shakespear coaching the AIS netball team in 1986

Season	Position	Won	Lost
1985	1st	5?	0
1986	1st	5	0
1987	2nd		
1989	2nd	4	2
1990	4th	2	3?
1991	4th	2	1
1992	3rd	5	1
1993	7th		
1994	7th		
1995	7th	1	6
1996	7th	1	6

Premierships
Runners Up

=== Commonwealth Bank Trophy ===
AIS Canberra Darters was originally formed as a partnership between the Australian Institute of Sport Netball Program and Netball ACT. They subsequently entered a combined team in the Commonwealth Bank Trophy. They joined the competition in 2003, replacing Adelaide Ravens. They continued to play in this competition until its demise in 2007. Their best performance came in 2004 when they finished 5th.

Regular season stats

Season	Position	Won	Lost	Drawn
2003	6th	5	9	0
2004	5th	4	10	0
2005	7th	2	12	0
2006	8th	0	14	0
2007	8th	1	13	0

=== Australian Netball League ===
The AIS and Netball ACT subsequently entered separate teams in the Australian Netball League with the Netball ACT team continuing to use the Canberra Darters name. The AIS played in the ANL between 2008 and 2012. In 2008 and 2009, Simone McKinnis guided AIS squads featuring Shae Bolton, Ashleigh Brazill, Shannon Eagland Jasmine Keene, Sharni Layton, Samantha May, April Letton, Chelsea Pitman, Kara Richards, Jacqui Russell, Laura Scherian, Amy Steel and Courtney Tairi to two successive grand finals. However, on each occasion they lost to Victorian Fury.

Regular season stats

Season	Position
2008	2nd
2009	2nd
2010	3rd
2011	n/a
2012	4th

Runners Up

=== State leagues ===
As well as entering teams in national leagues, AIS also entered teams in state leagues. During the 1980s and 1990s they regularly played in the New South Wales state netball league In 1997 they also began entering a team in the Dairy Farmers Victorian State League. In 2001, with a squad coached by Norma Plummer and featuring Jane Altschwager, Kristy Doyle, Susan Pratley, Kimberley Purcell, Rebecca Bulley and Natalie von Bertouch, an AIS team won the South Australia Farmers Union League title. Bertouch was also named the league's best and fairest player and was selected in the Team of the Year.

== Grand finals ==
=== National leagues ===
Esso Gold Club Championship

Season	Winners	Score	Runners up	Venue
1983	AIS	39–34	Melbourne Blues	Surfers Paradise

Australian Club Championships

Season	Winners	Score	Runners up	Venue
1984	Melbourne Blues	20–19	AIS	Adelaide

Esso Super League

Season	Winners	Score	Runners up	Venue
1985	AIS	52–46	Manly-Warringah (NSW)	
1986	AIS	61–35	East Doncaster (Victoria)	
1987	Melbourne Blues		AIS	
1989	Sydney Tigers	57–36	AIS	State Sports Centre

Australian Netball League

Season	Winners	Score	Runners up	Venue
2008	Victorian Fury	56–41	AIS	
2009	Victorian Fury	46–32	AIS	BCEC

=== State leagues ===
Season	League	Winners	Score	Runners up
1997	NSW Dairy Farmers State League	Parramatta Auburn	44–42	AIS
1998	Dairy Farmers Victorian State League			AIS
1999	Dairy Farmers Victorian State League		47–45	AIS
2000	SA Dairy Farmers State League	Contax		AIS
2001	SA Farmers Union League	AIS		Matrics

== Tours ==
The program also organised an annual international tour.

Destination	Year
Hawaii	1981, 1984
Canada	1982
Jamaica	1982, 1998, 2007, 2008
Trinidad and Tobago	1982, 1984, 1988, 1989, 1993, 2012
New Zealand	1982, 1983, 1993, 1994, 2010
Fiji	1982, 1983, 1990
Malaysia	1982
England	1983, 1985, 1990, 1992
Barbados	1984, 1988, 1993
Northern Ireland	1985, 1990
Papua New Guinea	1986
China	1990
Scotland	1990
Republic of Ireland	1990
Wales	1992
Barbados	1988, 1993
Cook Islands	1993, 1994
Caribbean	1995
South Africa	2009
Singapore	2010

== Notable former players ==
=== Internationals ===
Australia

- Jane Altschwager
- Megan Anderson
- Natalie Avellino
- Natalie von Bertouch
- Kate Beveridge
- Courtney Bruce
- Rebecca Bulley
- Natasha Chokljat
- Catherine Cox
- Nicole Cusack
- Liz Ellis
- Sharon Finnan
- Susan Fuhrmann
- Mo'onia Gerrard
- Laura Geitz
- Kimberlee Green
- Paige Hadley
- Janine Ilitch
- Roselee Jencke
- Cynna Kydd
- Sharni Layton
- April Letton
- Demelza McCloud
- Clare McMeniman
- Joanne Morgan
- Lauren Nourse
- Shelley O'Donnell
- Chelsea Pitman
- Susan Pratley
- Kim Ravaillion
- Nicole Richardson
- Peta Scholz
- Gabi Simpson
- Amy Steel
- Jo Weston
- Vicki Wilson
- Stephanie Wood

Australia Fast5

- Karyn Bailey
- Emily Beaton
- Shae Bolton
- Carla Dziwoki
- Samantha Poolman
- Maddy Proud
- Kate Shimmin
- Verity Simmons
- Kaylia Stanton

England

- Chelsea Pitman
- Abby Sargent
- Kate Shimmin

New Zealand

- Courtney Tairi

== Coaches ==
=== Head coaches ===
	Years
Wilma Shakespear	1981–1990
Gaye Teede	1990–1998
Norma Plummer	1999–2003
Michelle Wilkins	2003–2005
Brenda Scherian	2006
Simone McKinnis	2007–2010
Sue Gaudion	2010–2011
Julie Fitzgerald	2011–2013

=== Assistant coaches ===
	Years
Gaye Teede	1982–1990
Margaret Caldow	1984–1985
Jill McIntosh	1990
Michelle Fielke	1991
Roselee Jencke	2005

== Premierships ==
- Esso Super League
  - Winners: 1985, 1986: 2
  - Runners up: 1987, 1989 : 2
- Australian Netball League
  - Runners up: 2008, 2009: 2
- South Australia State League
  - Winners: 2001
  - Runners up: 2000
