= Megan Anderson (netball) =

Australia netball international

Personal information
- Full name: Megan Leigh Anderson
- Born: 9 November 1974 (age 52) Gosford, New South Wales, Australia
- Height: 1.78 m (5 ft 10 in)
- School: Corpus Christi College

Netball career
- Playing positions: GA, GS, WA
Years	Club team	Apps
1994	Australian Institute of Sport	
1997	Sydney Swifts	
1998	Sydney Sandpipers	13
1999	Adelaide Ravens	17
2000–2007	Sydney Swifts	
2006–2007	→ Northern Force	
2008–2010	Southern Steel	
2011	Northern Mystics	
Years	National team	Caps
2000–2006	Australia	20
2009	World 7	
Coaching career
- Years: Team
- 2020–: Queensland Firebirds
Medal record
Representing Australia
Commonwealth Games
Silver medal – second place	2006 Melbourne	Team

Megan Anderson, also known as Megan McWilliams and previously known as Megan Dehn, is a former Australia netball international and current netball coach. Between 2000 and 2006 she made 20 senior appearances for Australia. She was a member of the Australia team that won the silver medal at the 2006 Commonwealth Games. During the Commonwealth Bank Trophy era, Anderson was a member of Sydney Swifts teams that won premierships in 2001, 2004, 2006 and 2007. During the ANZ Championship era, she played for Southern Steel and Northern Mystics. After retiring as a player in 2011, she became a coach. In 2020 Anderson was appointed head coach of Queensland Firebirds.

== Early life, family and education ==
Anderson was raised in Woy Woy, New South Wales. Her mother was a netball umpire and Anderson began played netball, aged 8, with the St John the Baptist netball club and the Woy Woy Peninsula Netball Association at Ettalong Beach. Between 1991 and 1992, Anderson attended Corpus Christi College. She is the mother of twins, born c.2014. Anderson is married to Mark McWilliams.

== Playing career ==
=== New South Wales ===
Between 1992 and 1995, Anderson represented New South Wales in the Australian National Netball Championships. In 1992 she featured at under-19 level. Between 1993 and 1995 she played at under-21 levels.

=== Mobil Superleague ===
In 1994, Anderson played for the Australian Institute of Sport in the Mobil Superleague.

=== Commonwealth Bank Trophy ===
During the Commonwealth Bank Trophy era, Anderson made 141 appearances, playing 519 quarters and scoring 2507 goals. She played for Sydney Sandpipers, Adelaide Ravens and Sydney Swifts.

==== Sydney Sandpipers ====
In 1998 Anderson made 13 appearances for Sydney Sandpipers.

==== Adelaide Ravens ====
In 1999 Anderson made 17 appearances for Adelaide Ravens. Together with Michelle den Dekker, she was a member of the Ravens team coached by Patricia Mickan that finished the season as overall runners up. In the grand final, Anderson scored 17 from 30 as Ravens lost 62–30 to Adelaide Thunderbirds.

==== Sydney Swifts ====
During two spells with Swifts, Anderson made 111 appearances. She was a member of Sydney Swifts teams that won premierships in 2001, 2004, 2006 and 2007. Her team mates at Sydney Swifts included Briony Akle, Jane Altschwager, Catherine Cox and Liz Ellis. Between 2001 and 2005, she played in four grand finals for Swifts.

=== New Zealand ===
==== Northern Force ====
In 2006 and 2007, Anderson played for Northern Force in the National Bank Cup. During the breaks in the New Zealand competition, Anderson travelled back to Australia to play for Sydney Swifts in the Commonwealth Bank Trophy. She was the first player to feature in both competitions at the same time. In 2007, Anderson was a member of the Northern Force team that were defeated by Southern Sting in the last National Bank Cup grand final.

==== Southern Steel ====
Between 2008 and 2010, Anderson played for Southern Steel in the ANZ Championship. Anderson was originally a member of the 2008 New South Wales Swifts squad but subsequently withdrew and joined Steel. In 2009, Netball New Zealand initially blocked Anderson from playing for Steel because she was not a New Zealand citizen and wasn't eligible to represent the New Zealand national netball team. She subsequently agreed to play for Queensland Firebirds, but later withdrew from the team, citing work commitments. However, in June 2009 she was permitted to re-join Steel as a replacement for the pregnant Daneka Wipiiti. She then played for Steel in the final three rounds and the playoffs. She captained Steel during the 2010 season.

==== Northern Mystics ====
Anderson played for Northern Mystics during the 2011 ANZ Championship season. She had initially planned to continue playing for Southern Steel and was applying to become a New Zealand citizen. Meanwhile, Steel signed Natasha Chokljat, another Australia international. However, Anderson failed to meet the residency requirements required for New Zealand citizenship and Steel found themselves with two import players when they were only permitted to have one. Anderson considered retiring, but was persuaded by Mystics captain, Temepara George to move to Auckland for one last season. She was subsequently a member of the 2011 Northern Mystics team that were grand finalists and runners up in the ANZ Championship to Queensland Firebirds.

=== Grand finals ===
	Grand finals	Team	Place	Opponent	Goals
1	1999	Adelaide Ravens	Runners up	Adelaide Thunderbirds	17/30 (57%)
2	2001	Sydney Swifts	Winners	Adelaide Thunderbirds	28/35 (80%)
3	2003	Sydney Swifts	Runners up	Melbourne Phoenix	WA
4	2004	Sydney Swifts	Winners	Melbourne Phoenix	16/20 (80%)
5	2005	Sydney Swifts	Runners up	Melbourne Phoenix	15/23 (65%)
6	2007	Northern Force	Runners up	Southern Sting	?
7	2011	Northern Mystics	Runners up	Queensland Firebirds	WA

=== International ===
==== Australia ====
Between 2000 and 2006, Anderson made 20 senior appearances for Australia. Between 1994 and 1996 she had represented Australia at under-21 level. She made her senior debut on 23 November 2000 in an away match against South Africa. She was the first player to debut for Australia in the 21st century. Anderson was a member of the Australia team that won the silver medal at the 2006 Commonwealth Games.

==== World 7 ====
In August 2009, Anderson played for a World 7 team, coached by Julie Fitzgerald, that defeated New Zealand 2–1 in the 2009 Taini Jamison Trophy Series.

== Coaching career ==
=== Assistant coach ===
==== Northern Mystics ====
After retiring as a player, Anderson was retained by Northern Mystics as a specialist coach for the 2012 ANZ Championship season.

==== New South Wales Swifts ====
Between 2014 and 2017, Anderson served as an assistant coach to Robert Wright at New South Wales Swifts. Specialising in attack, Anderson was part of the coaching team which led Swifts to back-to-back ANZ Championship grand finals in 2015 and 2016.

==== Australia ====
Between 2017 and 2019, Anderson served as an assistant coach with Australia. Together with Robert Wright, she served as one of Stacey Marinkovich's assistants at the 2017 Fast5 Netball World Series. In 2018 and 2019, together with Clare Ferguson, she was an assistant to Lisa Alexander.

=== Head coach ===
In 2020, ahead of the 2021 Suncorp Super Netball season, Anderson was appointed head coach of Queensland Firebirds.

== Honours ==
Australia

- Commonwealth Games
  - Runners Up: 2006

World 7

- Taini Jamison Trophy
  - Winners: 2009

Sydney Swifts

- Commonwealth Bank Trophy
  - Winners: 2001, 2004, 2006, 2007
  - Runners up: 1998, 2003, 2005
  - Minor premierships: 2004, 2005, 2006

Northern Force

- National Bank Cup
  - Runners up: 2007

Northern Mystics

- ANZ Championship
  - Runners up: 2011

Individual awards

Year	Award
2000	Australian Sports Medal
2018	Netball NSW Hall of Fame
