= Tasha Nykyforak =

Australian netball player

Personal information
- Born: 24 March 1982 (age 44)
- Occupation: Teacher
- Height: 1.67 m (5 ft 6 in)

Netball career
- Playing positions: C, WA
Years	Club team	Apps
2008	West Coast Fever	
2002, 07	Perth Orioles	
- Updated on 2009-03-28

Tasha Nykyforak (born 24 March 1982) is an Australian netball player. She previously played for the Perth Orioles in the Commonwealth Bank Trophy, and was called up to play for the newly rebranded West Coast Fever in the 2008 ANZ Championship season, replacing injured shooter Tracey Pemberton.
