= Injuries in netball =

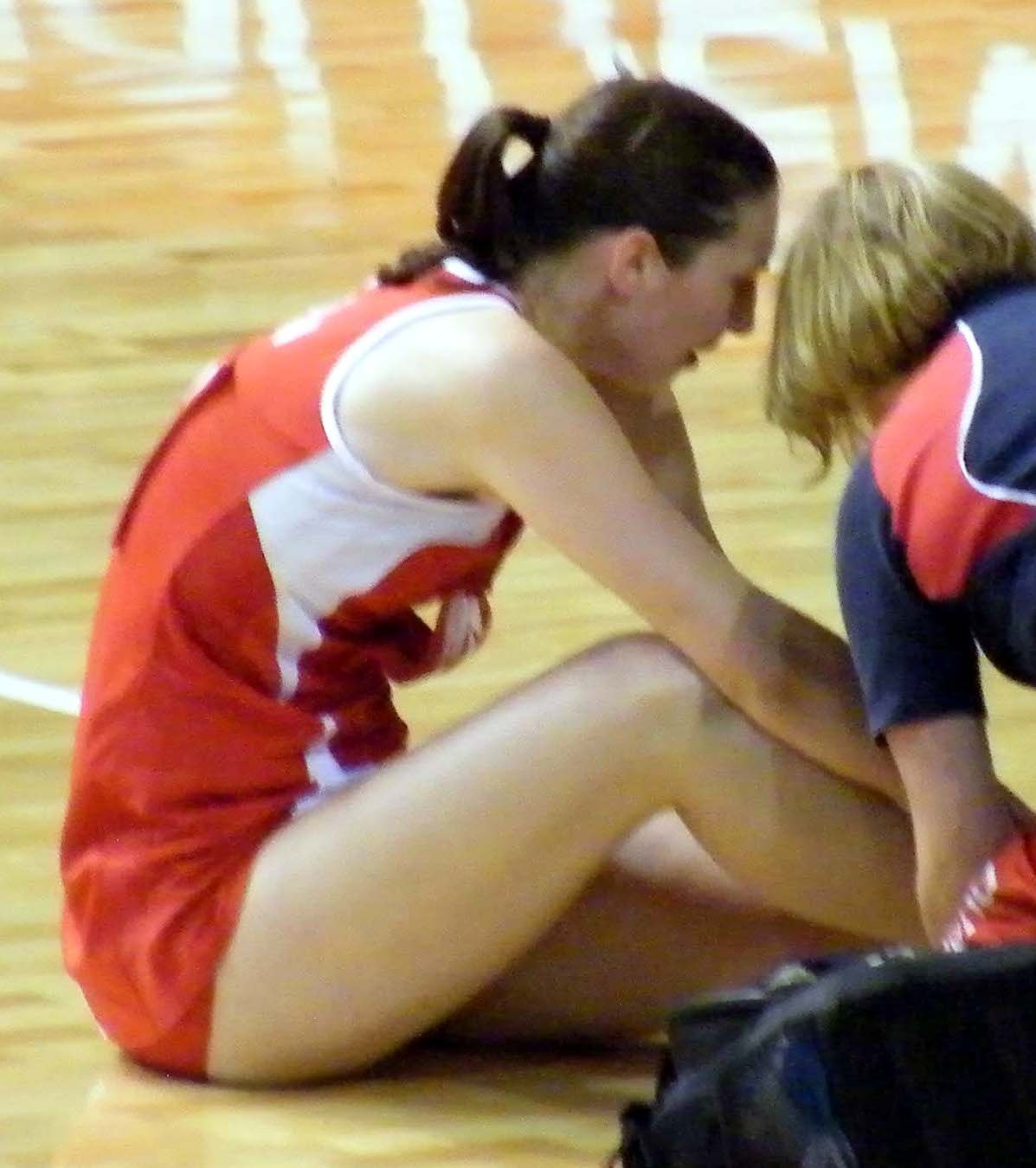
Rachel Dunn from Australia v England - Netball Test - Adelaide, October 2008 with an ankle injury.

Netball is a sport that has one of the largest female participation rates within the Commonwealth, most popular in the United Kingdom, Australia and New Zealand, with more than 20 million athletes participating in the sport. Netball is a ball sport played by two teams of seven players in which goals are scored by shooting the ball through a netted ring. Netball relies heavily on muscular endurance and bursts of rapid acceleration to “break free” from an opponent, as well as sudden and rapid changes of direction in combination with jumping to receive a pass, intercept a ball or rebound. The sudden stop-start motion of the game often leads to serious injuries in participants. Higher grade players, in both senior and junior competitions, are more susceptible to injuries than lower grade players, due to the high intensity and rapid pace of the game. An injury is most commonly defined as one that has occurred while participating in sport and which led to one of the following consequences: a reduction in the amount or level of sports activity; need for medical advice or treatment; and/or adverse economic or social effects for the athlete.

== Common soft tissue injuries in netball ==
A soft tissue injury is the damage of muscles, ligaments or tendons in the body. The most common soft tissue injuries in netball occur to the ankles, knees and hands. The main cause of these injuries is incorrect landing. Other factors influencing injury include tripping, collisions with other players, being struck by the ball, over-exertion and fatigue.

=== Ankles ===
In netball the ankle joint is most susceptible to injury and accounts for 31% of the injuries sustained in the sport. A sprained ankle is a tear or complete rupture of a ligament. The most commonly injured ligament is the Anterior Talofibular Ligament. This ligament is on the outside of the ankle and injury occurs when the sole of the foot rolls inwards. A minor sprain may only need a week to recover; however, severe ankle sprains can result in a player being out for 6–10 weeks.

=== Knees ===
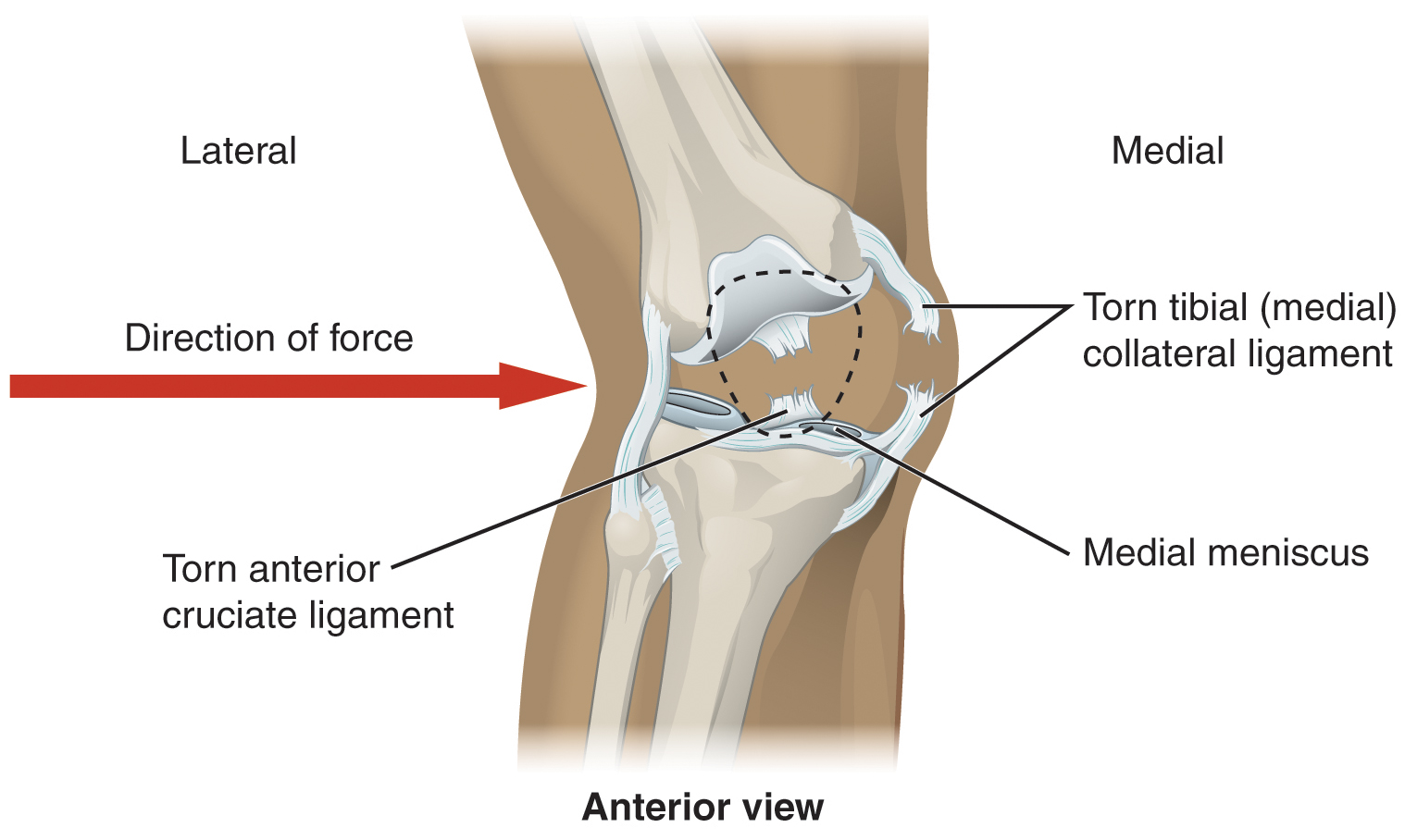
Ruptured Anterior Cruciate Ligament(ACL)

Knee injuries are the second most common injury in netball and are the most serious in regards to cost and disability. Studies show that the majority of knee injuries are new injuries, and those who sustain a knee injury often withdraw from participation in netball. The most common knee injuries are meniscal and major ligament sprains/ruptures. The most commonly injured ligament is the Anterior Cruciate Ligament(ACL). The ACL allows a twisting motion at the knee. Common symptoms of an ACL rupture include a “popping” sound at the time of the injury, severe pain, swelling and a feeling of instability. ACL injuries are difficult to effectively diagnose without the assistance of Magnetic Resonance Imaging (MRI). A ruptured ACL requires knee reconstruction surgery, resulting in the athlete being out of the game for 9–12 months.

=== Hands/other ===
Hand injuries usually involve joint ligamentous sprains and fractures. Children most commonly injure hands, in particular their fingers. Other injuries in netball include lower leg strain, quadriceps haematoma, rotator cuff shoulder problems, elbow joint dislocation, radial fracture, and back problems.

== Treatment ==
As soon as an injury occurs, play is stopped until the player has been properly assessed and, if necessary, removed from the court. Players are advised to seek immediate help from a qualified first aid provider or health practitioner. Netball injuries are commonly treated using the P.R.I.C.E.S., D.R.S.A.B.C., T.O.T.A.P.S. and R.I.C.E.R. regimes:

P - Protect

R - Rest

I - Ice

C - Compression

E - Elevation

S - Stabilise

D - Danger

R - Response

S - Send for help

A - Airway

B - Breathing

C - Circulation

T - Talk

O - Observe

T - Touch

A - Active movement

P - Passive movement

S - Skills test

R - Rest

I - Ice

C - Compression

E - Elevation

R - Referral

Injured players are advised to receive adequate treatment and full rehabilitation before returning to play. Serious ankle and knee ligament ruptures require reconstructive surgery. Following recovery and rehabilitation programs fully helps prevent injuries from recurring.

== Netball injury prevention ==
=== Good preparation ===
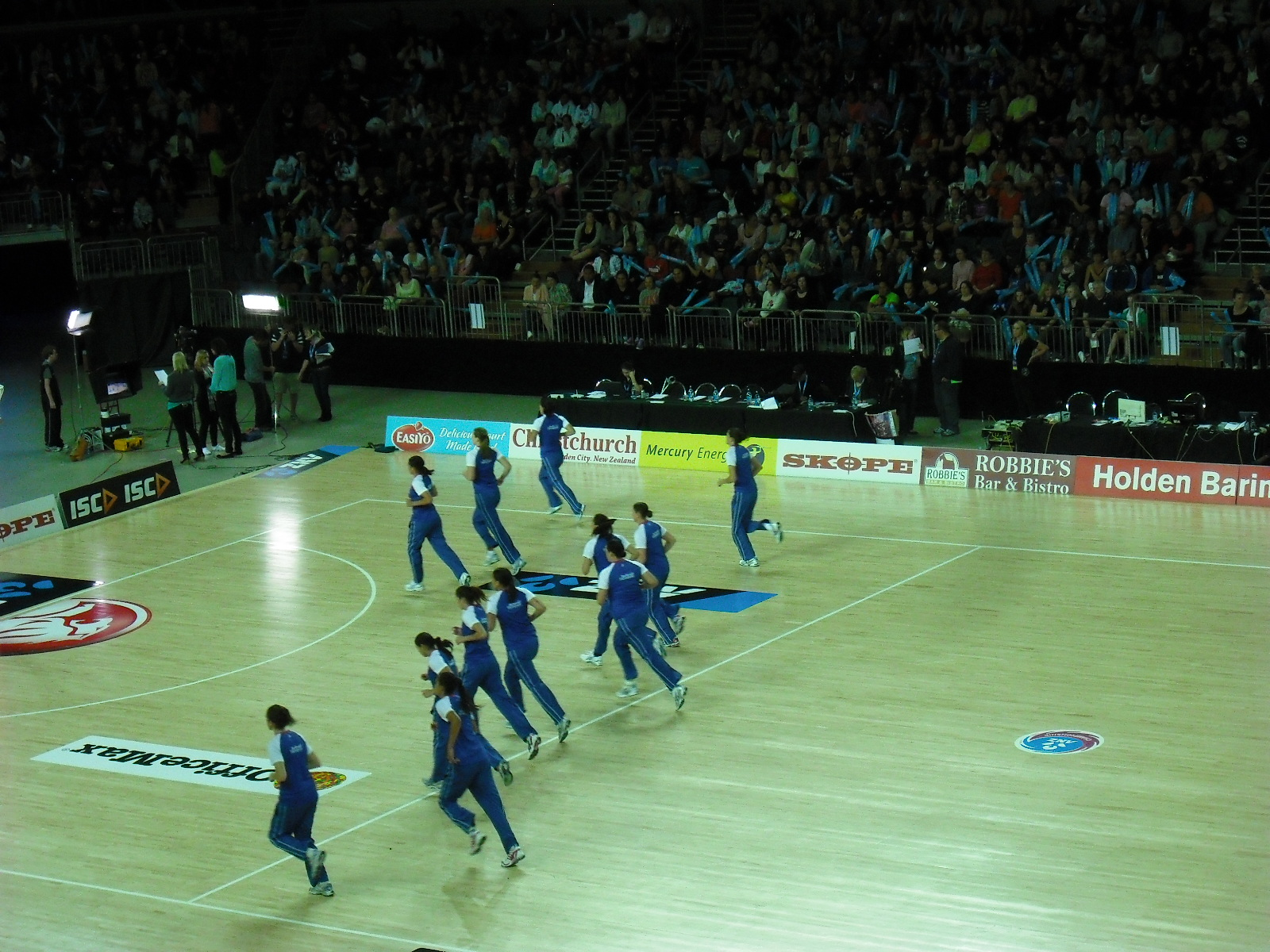
Northern Mystics warming up for their match against the Canterbury Tactix.

To help prevent netball injuries, pre-season training is recommended before the playing season begins. The distance travelled by elite players over a game ranges from 7 km (shooters/ defenders) to 8.8 km (centre court players). A game does not only consist of basic running; players are required to accelerate in rapid bursts for the majority of the game. Pre-season fitness programs typically focus on power, strength, agility and flexibility, especially of muscles around the ankles and feet. Fitness testing is recommended prior to competition to assess readiness to play.

=== Good technique ===
Training should consist of netball- specific exercises that focus on enhancing body balance, landing control, change of direction and catching passes. Coaches are encouraged to undergo regular educational updates to ensure their knowledge of correct training drills is current. It is recommended that children are properly taught the fundamentals of netball before they participate in game situations, so that incorrect techniques can be corrected before they become habits.

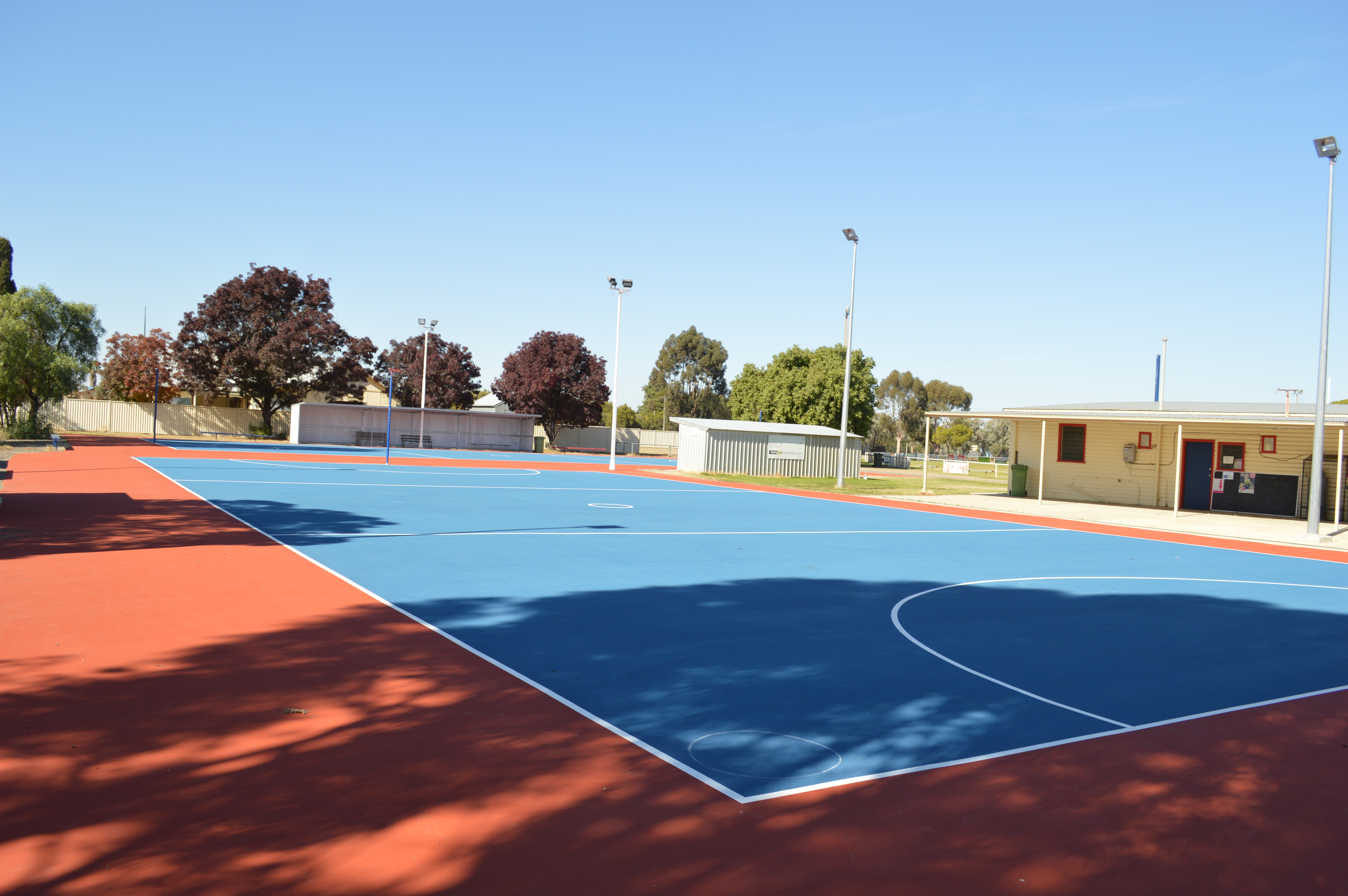
A hard but smooth netball court surface.

=== Warm up ===
A warm-up plays an important role in preventing injury in netball. A warm-up before physical activity prepares the body for vigorous exercise, reduces the risk of injury, reduces muscle stiffness and mentally prepares the athlete. A warm-up typically consists of running, dynamic movements and dynamic stretches, and is recommended to last a minimum of ten minutes.

=== Equipment/clothing ===
Goal posts in netball should be firmly fixed to the ground and fitted with a padded post protector. Courts should have firm, smooth surfaces with no loose gravel or hazards. Shoes are considered the most important uniform item for a netball player. Netball- specific shoes are recommended, as they are tailored to the demands of the game and provide the correct level of support and cushioning. Wearing braces or strapping the ankles is also recommended to provide extra support and decrease the risk of a major injury occurring.

== Psychological effects of having a major injury ==
For many netball players a serious injury can be a traumatic life event that results in physical and psychological ramifications. The main psychological effects include the initial emotional response of experiencing an injury, the psychological factors that influence the recovery process, and the psychological impact of an injury on the athlete's future performance. Not all injured athletes experience the same cognitive and emotional responses.

=== Emotional responses ===
During injury and recovery players may experience different mood states. The most commonly found mood disturbances are increases in depression, tension and anger. The emotional response depends on the severity of the injury. Self-efficacy is defined as one's belief in one's ability to succeed in specific situations. Physical self-efficacy is often affected by an injury. Players often enter a highly negative state of mind immediately after an injury; however, during recovery they often become highly positive.

=== Self-motivation ===
In many cases, players are highly motivated to return to playing netball as soon as possible. During rehabilitation an athlete's motivation and enthusiasm for treatment may decrease if they are experiencing setbacks, or a period of little or no improvement. Studies show that it is important for athletes to have a good support network to keep them positive and focused during these times.

=== Confidence ===
Although physical recovery is critical, psychological rehabilitation is considered the most important part of recovery. Even though a player may be physically ready to return to netball, they may not be psychologically ready to play. Various doubts, fears and anxieties may surface when thinking about returning to netball. The athlete may fear they are going to be a different player, that they will not meet their coach's or teammates' expectations, or that their physical fitness will not return to its pre-injury state. This can result in the athlete placing considerable pressure on themselves. This anxiety and tension can lead to the following outcomes: reinjury; injury to another body part; lowered confidence resulting in a temporary or permanent performance decrement; general depression; and fear of further injury, which can sap motivation and the desire to return to competition.

== Dealing with psychological effects ==
The most successful psychological techniques that aid injury recovery are good interpersonal communication skills, positive reinforcement, setting realistic goals, knowing methods for positive self-thoughts, coach support, and keeping the athlete involved with the team.

=== Returning to pre-injury levels & goal setting ===
For most athletes, a successful return to netball from injury is determined by the ability to train and compete at pre-injury levels and standards. Measures include reaching past endurance fitness test levels (beep tests), the ability to perform and complete sport-specific training exercises, and maintaining performance. Achieving these goals at training best prepares an athlete for the demands of competition. Athletes are advised to set realistic, achievable goals, which may need to be long term. Goals should also be flexible, as rehabilitation progress is often unpredictable.

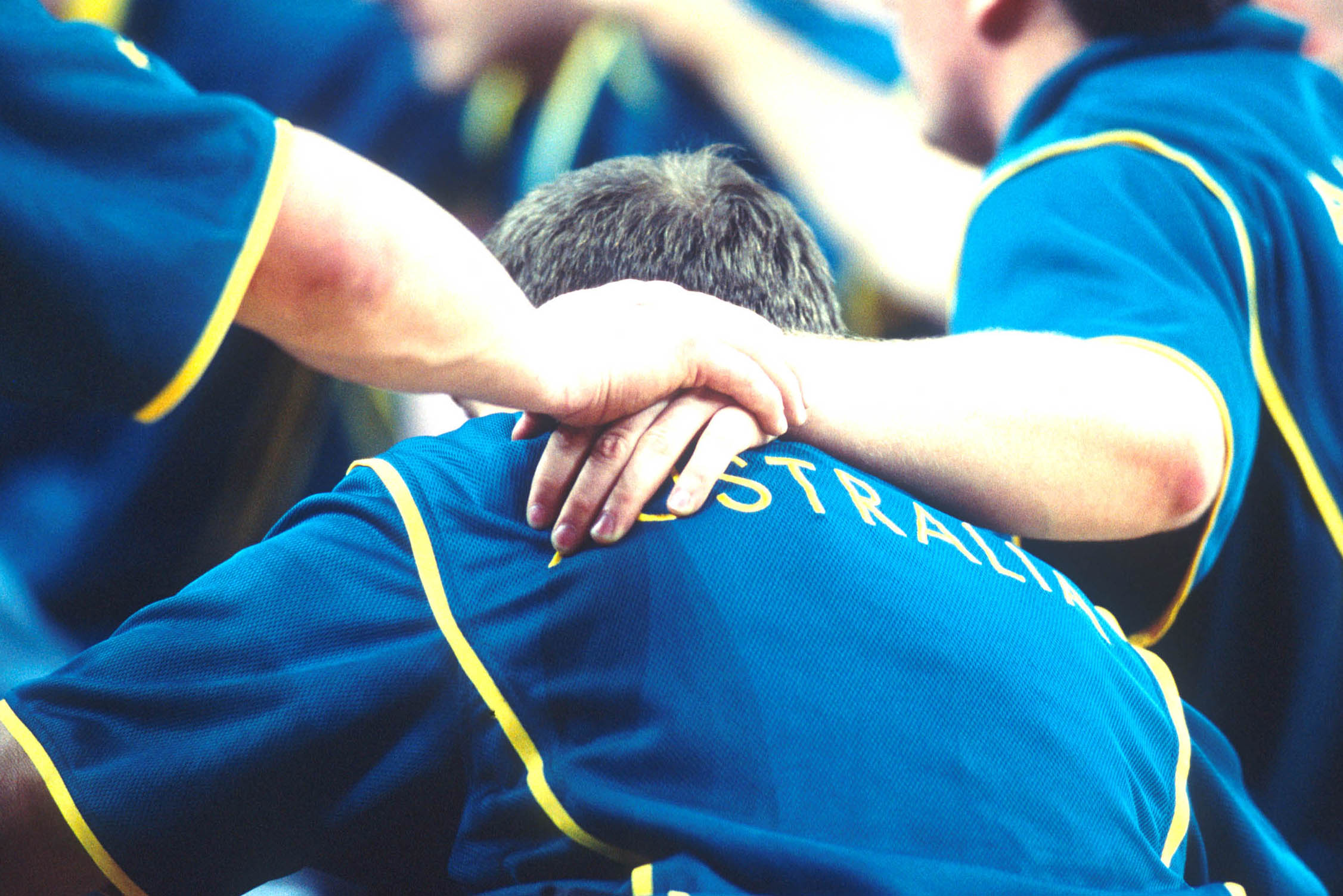
Strong support is needed from teammates, coaches, friends and family.

=== Active participation in rehabilitation ===
Athletes who are engaged in their rehabilitation program are likely to cope with their injury more successfully. Physiotherapists state that athletes who show interest in their rehabilitation by communicating well, asking questions, listening well to advice, and providing feedback are more likely to have a positive psychological response to their injury.

=== Strong support systems ===
Social support is important during the injury, rehabilitation and return-to-sport phases. This may include coaches, trainers, friends and family, who can provide positive encouragement when the athlete needs it. It is recommended that the athlete talk to someone they feel comfortable with and who will listen and support them.

=== Sports psychologist ===
It can be beneficial for an injured player to work with a sports psychologist. Coaches and family can be helpful; however, they may at times be too close to the situation, and an outside point of view may be needed.

=== Take it slow ===
A gradual return to match play is recommended. Taking part in game play situations at training is considered important, and athletes may start in a lower grade than usual to help ease back into the game. One approach is to play one quarter in the first game back and gradually build up to a full game as the player progresses.

== Controversies ==
=== Hypermobility and injuries in junior netball players ===
Hypermobility is defined as a condition in which an individual's synovial joints have a range of motion beyond normal limits. Hypermobile joints can be a performance enhancement in some sports, for example spin bowlers in cricket. However, some studies suggest an increased risk of joint dislocations, sprains and joint hyperextension in athletes with hypermobile joints, and that recognising hypermobility in young female athletes may reduce the risk of injuries occurring. Others suggest that hypermobility is not associated with an increased incidence of injuries in junior netball players.

== Serious/career threatening injuries in elite netball players ==
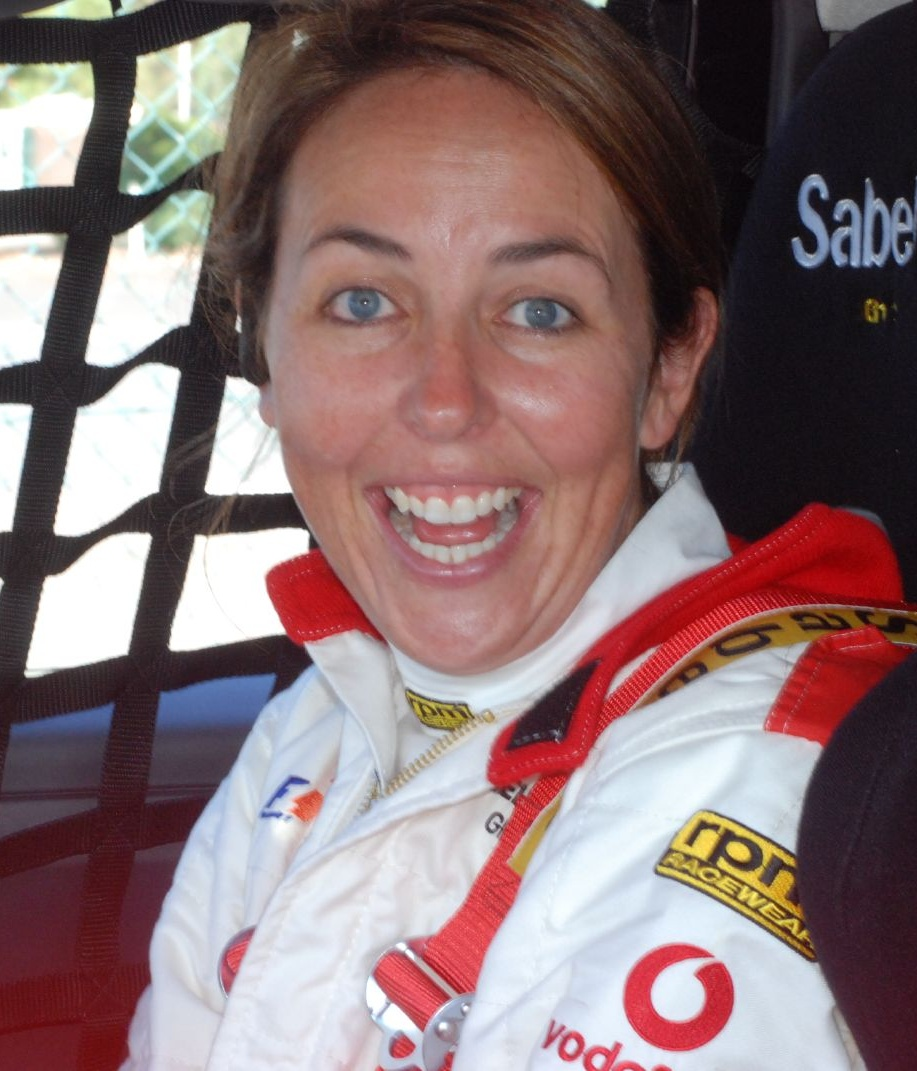
Australian netball player Liz Ellis

- 2005

In October 2005, Australian captain Liz Ellis suffered a career-threatening knee injury after tearing her ACL in a match against New Zealand. This injury ruled her out of the 2006 Commonwealth Games. Ellis said that she had to reignite her passion and love for the game that had been her life. Ellis said, “It was soul-destroying to watch my team walk out without me and realise, hey, they can play without me”.

After rehabilitating her knee, Ellis returned to the Australian team and played for a further two years. She ended her 18-year career in her 122nd test, in which Australia won the world championship 42–38.

- 2012

West Coast Fever captain Ashleigh Brazill ruptured the meniscus in her left knee late in the 2012 ANZ Championship season. Brazill had been selected to represent Australia in the 2012 Constellation Cup, but withdrew from the team. Brazill rebuilt the strength in her knee and resumed playing in the 2013 season.

- 2014

In October 2014, Casey Kopua suffered a knee injury during the 2014 Constellation Cup. Kopua ruptured the patella tendon in her left knee and underwent surgery to repair the tendon, which was expected to keep her out of netball for up to 6 months.

- 2015

In April 2015, Melbourne Vixens midcourter Madi Robinson ruptured the anterior cruciate ligament in her right knee. As a result, Robinson missed the 2015 Netball World Cup.

== See also ==
- Australian rules football injuries
- Sports injury
