= 2012 Constellation Cup =

International netball series

Tournament details
- Host countries: Australia; New Zealand
- Dates: 16–23 September 2012

Final positions
- Champions: New Zealand (1st title)
- Runners-up: Australia

Tournament statistics
- Matches played: 3
- Top scorer(s): Caitlin Bassett; 74/85 (87%)

The 2012 Constellation Cup was the 3rd Constellation Cup series played between Australia and New Zealand. The series, also known as the New World Series, featured three netball test matches, played in September 2012. The Australia team was coached by Lisa Alexander and captained by Natalie von Bertouch. New Zealand were coached by Waimarama Taumaunu and captained by Casey Williams and Laura Langman. New Zealand won the series for the first time. After winning the opening test, New Zealand clinched the series after winning the second test. The series finished 2–1 to New Zealand after Australia won the final test.

== Squads ==
=== Australia ===
Australia roster
Players
Coaches

Name	Pos	DOB	Height	Club	Nat	Caps
Caitlin Bassett	GS	23 May 1988 (aged 24)	1.96 m (6 ft 5 in)	West Coast Fever
Erin Bell	GA, WA, GS	26 October 1985 (aged 26)	1.78 m (5 ft 10 in)	Adelaide Thunderbirds
Natalie von Bertouch (c)	C, WA, WD	16 December 1982 (aged 29)	1.75 m (5 ft 9 in)	Adelaide Thunderbirds
Madison Browne	WA, C	5 January 1988 (aged 24)	1.68 m (5 ft 6 in)	Melbourne Vixens
Rebecca Bulley	GD, GK, WD	18 August 1982 (aged 30)	1.86 m (6 ft 1 in)	Adelaide Thunderbirds
Bianca Chatfield	GK, GD, WD	2 April 1982 (aged 30)	1.89 m (6 ft 2 in)	Melbourne Vixens
Julie Corletto	GD, WD, GK	10 October 1986 (aged 25)	1.84 m (6 ft 0 in)	Melbourne Vixens
Catherine Cox (vc)	GS, GA	24 May 1976 (aged 36)	1.88 m (6 ft 2 in)	West Coast Fever
Laura Geitz	GK, GD	4 November 1987 (aged 24)	1.85 m (6 ft 1 in)	Queensland Firebirds
Mo'onia Gerrard	GD, WD	15 November 1980 (aged 31)	1.80 m (5 ft 11 in)	New South Wales Swifts
Kimberlee Green	C, WA	5 March 1986 (aged 26)	1.76 m (5 ft 9 in)	New South Wales Swifts
Renae Hallinan	WD, C	18 July 1986 (aged 26)	1.78 m (5 ft 10 in)	Adelaide Thunderbirds
Natalie Medhurst	GA, GS	20 January 1984 (aged 28)	1.78 m (5 ft 10 in)	Queensland Firebirds
Chelsea Pitman	GA, WA	8 June 1988 (aged 24)	1.81 m (5 ft 11 in)	Queensland Firebirds
Susan Pratley	GA, GS	23 March 1984 (aged 28)	1.80 m (5 ft 11 in)	New South Wales Swifts

Head coach

- Lisa Alexander

Assistant coach

- Julie Fitzgerald

Manager:
Margaret Molina
Bree McDonald
Specialist Coaches
Nicole Cusack
Michelle den Dekker
Diane Honey
Simone McKinnis
Doctors
Kalman Fried
Mark DeCruz
Tom Hilton
Physiotherapist:
Alanna Antcliff
Steve Hawkins
Performance Analyst
Tara Handke
Massage Therapist
Helen Cross
Strength and conditioning:
Dirk Spits

Notes

- (c) – Captain
- (cc) – Co-captain
- (vc) – Vice-captain
- – Injury / maternity leave
- (TRP) – Temporary Replacement Player

Milestones

- On 20 September 2012 in the second test, Catherine Cox made her 100th senior appearance for Australia. Cox became only the fourth Australia netball international, after Vicki Wilson, Sharelle McMahon and Liz Ellis, to reach the century mark.

=== New Zealand ===
New Zealand roster
Players
Coaches

Name	Pos	DOB	Height	Club	Nat	Caps
Jodi Brown	GA, GS	6 May 1981 (aged 31)	1.85 m (6 ft 1 in)	Southern Steel
Kayla Cullen	GD, WD, C	13 February 1992 (aged 20)	1.83 m (6 ft 0 in)	Northern Mystics
Leana de Bruin	GD, GK	9 July 1977 (aged 35)	1.90 m (6 ft 3 in)	Waikato Bay of Plenty Magic
Irene van Dyk	GS, GA	21 June 1972 (aged 40)	1.90 m (6 ft 3 in)	Waikato Bay of Plenty Magic
Katrina Grant	GK, GD, WD	6 May 1987 (aged 25)	1.87 m (6 ft 2 in)	Central Pulse
Anna Harrison	GK, GD, WD	15 April 1983 (aged 28)	1.87 m (6 ft 2 in)	Northern Mystics
Laura Langman^{1} (c)	C, WD	16 April 1986 (aged 26)	1.73 m (5 ft 8 in)	Waikato Bay of Plenty Magic
Cathrine Latu	GS, GA	25 October 1986 (aged 25)	1.89 m (6 ft 2 in)	Northern Mystics
Camilla Lees	C, WA, WD	27 March 1989 (aged 23)	1.77 m (5 ft 10 in)	Central Pulse
Bailey Mes	GS, GA	27 May 1989 (aged 23)	1.87 m (6 ft 2 in)	Northern Mystics
Maria Tutaia	GA, GS	18 February 1987 (aged 25)	1.88 m (6 ft 2 in)	Northern Mystics
Casey Williams^{1} (c)	GD, GK	19 June 1985 (aged 27)	1.88 m (6 ft 2 in)	Waikato Bay of Plenty Magic

Head coach

- Waimarama Taumaunu

Notes

- (c) – Captain
- (cc) – Co-captain
- (vc) – Vice-captain
- – Injury / maternity leave
- (TRP) – Temporary Replacement Player

Notes

- ^1 Casey Williams was initially named New Zealand captain. However, she missed all three tests because of injury. Laura Langman captained the team for the series.

== Matches ==
=== New World Netball Series ===
==== First test ====
16 September 2012	Australia	52–54	New Zealand	Hisense Arena
16 September 2012	Catherine Cox 27/33 (82%); Caitlin Bassett 15/17 (88%); Natalie Medhurst 8/12 (67%); Erin Bell 2/4 (50%)		Irene van Dyk 28/29 (97%); Maria Tutaia 26/29 (90%)	Hisense Arena

==== Second test ====
20 September 2012	New Zealand	50–49	Australia	Vector Arena; Attendance: 8,800
20 September 2012	Maria Tutaia 26/29 (90%); Irene van Dyk 24/26 (92%)		Caitlin Bassett 19/23 (83%); Catherine Cox 15/18 (83%); Natalie Medhurst 15	Vector Arena; Attendance: 8,800

==== Third test ====
23 September 2012	New Zealand	53–59	Australia	CBS Canterbury Arena
23 September 2012	Scoring by quarter: 20–15, 28–32, 35–47, 53–59			CBS Canterbury Arena
23 September 2012	Irene van Dyk 19/21 (90%); Jodi Brown 21/25 (84%); Cathrine Latu 13/13 (100%)		Caitlin Bassett 40/50 (80%); Natalie Medhurst 19/20 (95%)	CBS Canterbury Arena
