= Jenna McClure =

Australian netball player

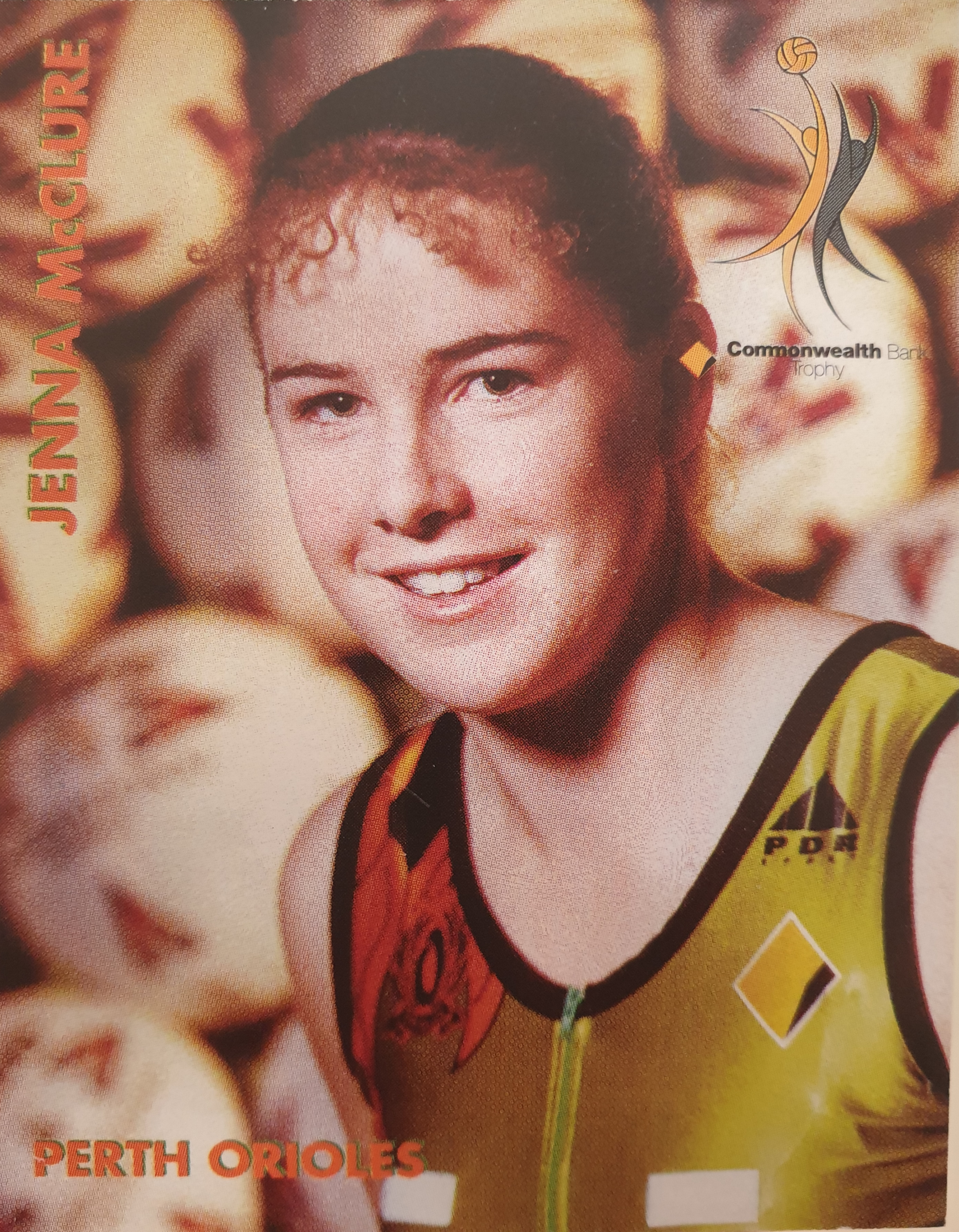

Personal information
- Born: 8 May 1981 (age 45)
- Occupation: Accountant
- Height: 1.81 m (5 ft 11 in)

Netball career
- Playing positions: GD, WA, C
Years	Club team	Apps
1999–2004	Perth Orioles	

Jenna McClure (born 8 May 1981) is an Australian former netball player. She played for Perth Orioles in the Commonwealth Bank Trophy.
