= 2009 Taini Jamison Trophy Series =

International netball series

Tournament details
- Country: New Zealand
- Dates: 24–29 August 2009
- Teams: 2

Final positions
- Champions: World 7 (1st title)
- Runners-up: New Zealand

Tournament statistics
- Matches played: 3

The 2009 Taini Jamison Trophy Series, also referred to as the New World Series, was the second Taini Jamison Trophy series. It featured New Zealand playing a World 7 in a series of three netball test matches, played in August 2009. The World 7 won the opening test 48–44. They then went 2–0 up by winning the second test 53–44. This confirmed the World 7 as winners of the Taini Jamison Trophy. New Zealand won the third test 46–41 to see the series finish 2–1. The New Zealand team were coached by Ruth Aitken and captained by Casey Williams. The World 7 were coached by Julie Fitzgerald, captained by Natasha Chokljat and featured a selection of Australia, England, Jamaica and Samoa internationals.

== Squads ==
=== New Zealand ===
New Zealand roster
Players
Coaches

Name	Pos	DOB	Height	Club	Nat	Caps
Liana Barrett-Chase	C, WA	31 October 1984 (aged 24)	1.68 m (5 ft 6 in)	Southern Steel
Maree Bowden	WA, C	20 November 1979 (aged 29)	1.75 m (5 ft 9 in)	Canterbury Tactix
Leana de Bruin	GD, GK	9 July 1977 (aged 32)	1.90 m (6 ft 3 in)	Waikato Bay of Plenty Magic
Temepara George	C, WA	23 October 1975 (aged 33)	1.70 m (5 ft 7 in)	Northern Mystics
Katrina Grant	GK, GD, WD	6 May 1987 (aged 22)	1.87 m (6 ft 2 in)	Southern Steel
Paula Griffin	GS, GA	11 July 1988 (aged 21)	1.85 m (6 ft 1 in)	Central Pulse
Joline Henry	GD, WD	29 September 1982 (aged 26)	1.83 m (6 ft 0 in)	Waikato Bay of Plenty Magic
Laura Langman	C, WD	16 April 1986 (aged 23)	1.73 m (5 ft 8 in)	Waikato Bay of Plenty Magic
Anna Thompson	GA, WA	18 June 1986 (aged 23)	1.76 m (5 ft 9 in)	Canterbury Tactix
Maria Tutaia	GA, GS	18 February 1987 (aged 22)	1.88 m (6 ft 2 in)	Northern Mystics
Irene van Dyk	GS, GA	21 June 1972 (aged 37)	1.90 m (6 ft 3 in)	Waikato Bay of Plenty Magic
Casey Williams (c)	GD, GK	19 June 1985 (aged 24)	1.88 m (6 ft 2 in)	Waikato Bay of Plenty Magic
Larrissa Willcox	GK, GD, WD	27 November 1982 (aged 26)	1.82 m (6 ft 0 in)	Canterbury Tactix

Head coach

- Ruth Aitken

Assistant coach

- Waimarama Taumaunu

Notes

- (c) – Captain
- (cc) – Co-captain
- (vc) – Vice-captain
- – Injury / maternity leave
- (TRP) – Temporary Replacement Player

Debuts

- Anna Thompson made her senior debut for New Zealand in the second test.

=== World 7 ===
World 7 roster
Players
Coaches

Name	Pos	DOB	Height	Club	Nat	Caps
Romelda Aiken	GS, GA	19 November 1988 (aged 20)	1.96 m (6 ft 5 in)	Queensland Firebirds/Jamaica	(Jamaica)
Louisa Brownfield	GS, GA	14 April 1984 (aged 25)	1.91 m (6 ft 3 in)	Mavericks/England	(England)
Althea Byfield	GD, GK, WD	28 November 1982 (aged 26)	1.83 m (6 ft 0 in)	Central Pulse/Jamaica	(Jamaica)
Natasha Chokljat (c)	C, WD, WA	27 April 1979 (aged 30)	1.76 m (5 ft 9 in)	Melbourne Vixens/Australia	(Australia)
Megan Dehn	GA, GS, WA	9 November 1974 (aged 34)	1.78 m (5 ft 10 in)	Southern Steel/Australia	(Australia)
Simone Forbes		20 June 1981 (aged 28)	1.73 m (5 ft 8 in)	Jamaica	(Jamaica)
Tamsin Greenway	C, WA, GA	6 October 1982 (aged 26)	1.76 m (5 ft 9 in)	Queensland Firebirds/England	(England)
Cathrine Latu	GS, GA	25 October 1986 (aged 22)	1.89 m (6 ft 2 in)	Northern Mystics/Samoa	(Samoa)
Demelza McCloud	GD, GK	5 August 1980 (aged 29)	1.88 m (6 ft 2 in)	Queensland Firebirds/Australia	(Australia)
Geva Mentor	GK, GD, WD	17 September 1984 (aged 24)	1.91 m (6 ft 3 in)	Adelaide Thunderbirds/England	(England)
Sonia Mkoloma	GD, GK	17 January 1979 (aged 30)	1.86 m (6 ft 1 in)	Central Pulse/England	(England)
Peta Scholz	WD, C, GD	17 January 1976 (aged 34)	1.80 m (5 ft 11 in)	Oakdale/Australia	(Australia)
Frances Solia	C, WA	20 September 1976 (aged 32)	1.69 m (5 ft 7 in)	Magic/Samoa	(Samoa)

Head coach

- (Australia) Julie Fitzgerald

Assistant coach

- (Australia) Lisa Alexander

Notes

- (c) – Captain
- (cc) – Co-captain
- (vc) – Vice-captain
- – Injury / maternity leave
- (TRP) – Temporary Replacement Player

== Matches ==
=== First test ===
24 August 2009; 7.30pm (NZT)	New Zealand	44–48	World 7	TSB Bank Arena	TV One
24 August 2009; 7.30pm (NZT)	Scoring by quarter: 12–13, 22–25, 34–38, 44–48			TSB Bank Arena	TV One
24 August 2009; 7.30pm (NZT)	Irene van Dyk 26/30 (87%); Maria Tutaia 18/23 (78%)		Cathrine Latu 38/44 (86%); Megan Dehn 10/13 (77%)	TSB Bank Arena	TV One

Figures released by TVNZ showed that the first test was watched on TV One by an audience of 483,100. In comparison, the Australia vs. New Zealand rugby union test the previous Saturday, was watched on Sky Sport (New Zealand) by an audience of 444,100.

=== Second test ===
26 August 2009	New Zealand	44–53	World 7	Energy Events Centre	TV One
26 August 2009	Scoring by quarter: 7–15, 16–23, 30–39, 44–53			Energy Events Centre	TV One
26 August 2009	Irene van Dyk 26/29 (90%); Maria Tutaia 15/21 (71%); Anna Thompson 3/5 (60%)		Romelda Aiken 24/27 (89%); Louisa Brownfield 14/16 (88%); Megan Dehn 15/18 (83%)	Energy Events Centre	TV One

=== Third test ===
29 August 2009	New Zealand	46–41	World 7	Trusts Stadium	TV One
29 August 2009	Scoring by quarter: 14–11, 22–24, 33–35, 46–41			Trusts Stadium	TV One
29 August 2009	Irene van Dyk; Maria Tutaia; Paula Griffin 73%		Cathrine Latu 12/14 (86%); Romelda Aiken	Trusts Stadium	TV One
