= Sydney Swifts =

Defunct Australian netball team

- Founded: 1996
- Disbanded: 2007
- Based in: Sydney
- Head coach: Julie Fitzgerald (1997–2007)
- Captain: Catriona Wagg (1997–1999); Liz Ellis (2000–2007)
- Premierships: 4 (2001, 2004, 2006, 2007)
- League: Commonwealth Bank Trophy
Uniform

Sydney Swifts were an Australian netball team based in Sydney. Between 1997 and 2007 they represented Netball New South Wales in the Commonwealth Bank Trophy league. Together with Sydney Sandpipers and Hunter Jaegers they were one of three teams to represent NNSW in the competition. After Melbourne Phoenix, Swifts were the league's second most successful team, winning four premierships and three minor premierships. In 2008, when the Commonwealth Bank Trophy was replaced by the ANZ Championship, Swifts and Jaegers merged to form New South Wales Swifts.

== History ==
=== Mobil Superleague ===
Sydney Swifts evolved from a state league team that represented the Ku-ring-gai area. Between 1994 and 1996, Sydney Ku-ring-gai represented Netball New South Wales in the Mobil Superleague. They were also known as Sydney Cenovis because they were sponsored by Cenovis. The team featured a young Liz Ellis and Catherine Cox and were coached by Julie Fitzgerald. In 1994 and 1996 they were Mobil Superleague semi-finalists.

=== Commonwealth Bank Trophy ===
Between 1997 and 2007, Sydney Swifts played in the Commonwealth Bank Trophy league. Together with Adelaide Ravens, Adelaide Thunderbirds, Melbourne Kestrels, Melbourne Phoenix, Perth Orioles, Queensland Firebirds and Sydney Sandpipers, Swifts were one of the founding members of the league. Together with Sydney Sandpipers and Hunter Jaegers, they were one of three teams to represent Netball New South Wales in the competition. After Melbourne Phoenix, Swifts were the league's second most successful team, winning four premierships in 2001, 2004, 2006 and 2007. Between 2004 and 2006, they also won three successive minor premierships. Swifts head coach throughout the Commonwealth Bank Trophy era was Julie Fitzgerald. Their leading players included Liz Ellis, Alison Broadbent, Catherine Cox, Megan Anderson and Selina Gilsenan. In 2008, when the Commonwealth Bank Trophy was replaced by the ANZ Championship, Swifts and Jaegers merged to form New South Wales Swifts.

Regular season statistics

Season	Position	Won	Lost	Drawn
1997	3rd	7	5	2
1998	3rd	11	3	0
1999	2nd	11	3	0
2000	4th	9	5	0
2001	2nd	11	3	0
2002	3rd	11	3	0
2003	2nd	10	4	0
2004	1st	12	2	0
2005	1st	12	2	0
2006	1st	14	0	0
2007	2nd	11	3	0

Minor Premiership and Premiership
Minor Premiership and Runners-up
Premierships
Runners-up

== Grand finals ==
Season	Winners	Score	Runners-up	Venue
1998	Adelaide Thunderbirds	48–42	Sydney Swifts	ETSA Park
2001	Sydney Swifts	57–32	Adelaide Thunderbirds	State Sports Centre
2003	Melbourne Phoenix	47–44	Sydney Swifts	Sydney Super Dome
2004	Sydney Swifts	52–51	Melbourne Phoenix	Sydney Super Dome
2005	Melbourne Phoenix	61–44	Sydney Swifts	Vodafone Arena
2006	Sydney Swifts	65–36	Adelaide Thunderbirds	Sydney Olympic Park Sports Centre
2007	Sydney Swifts	45–37	Melbourne Phoenix	Acer Arena

== Home venues ==
	Years
Anne Clark Netball Centre	1997
State Sports Centre	1998
Sydney Super Dome	
Sydney Olympic Park Sports Centre	
Wollongong Entertainment Centre	2005

== Notable former players ==
=== Internationals ===
Australia

- Jane Altschwager
- Megan Anderson
- Erin Bell
- Alison Broadbent
- Catherine Cox
- Liz Ellis
- Mo'onia Gerrard
- Selina Gilsenan
- Kimberlee Green
- Susan Pettitt
- Chelsea Pitman
- Joanne Morgan

Australia Fast5

- Vanessa Ware
- Amorette Wild

England

- Chelsea Pitman

=== Award winners ===
Most Valuable Player

Season	Player
1998	Liz Ellis
2002	Liz Ellis
2006	Liz Ellis

Grand final MVP

Season	Player
2001	Liz Ellis
2004	Catherine Cox
2006	Liz Ellis
2007	Selina Gilsenan

Best New Talent

Season	Player
2001	Jane Altschwager

=== Captains ===
Captains	Years
Catriona Wagg	1997–1999
Liz Ellis	2000–2007

=== Most Appearances ===
Players	Matches	Quarters
Liz Ellis	173	680
Alison Broadbent	152	562
Catherine Cox	135	
Megan Anderson	111	
Selina Gilsenan	121	461
Raegan Jackson	92	
Susan Pettitt	68	
Briony Akle	53	
Jane Altschwager	50	
Catriona Wagg	49	

== Head coaches ==
Coach	Years
Julie Fitzgerald	1997–2007

Support Staff

Team Manager Jan Troy (1998–2006)

Team Physiotherapist Sean Mungovan (1999–2007)

== Sponsorship ==
Sponsors	Seasons
TAB	1997–2007

== Premierships ==
- Commonwealth Bank Trophy
  - Winners: 2001, 2004, 2006, 2007: 4
  - Runners up: 1998, 2003, 2005: 3
  - Minor premierships: 2004, 2005, 2006: 3
