= Jessica Shynn =

Australian netball player

Personal information
- Full name: Jessica Elizabeth Pauline Shynn
- Born: 20 August 1982 (age 44)
- Height: 1.77 m (5 ft 10 in)

Netball career
- Playing positions: WD, C
Years	Club team	Apps
1999, 2001–06	Perth Orioles	87
Years	National team	Caps
2002–06	Australia	9
Medal record
Representing Australia
Commonwealth Games
Silver medal – second place	2006 Melbourne	Netball
- Updated on 2009-03-29

Jessica Elizabeth Pauline Shynn (born 20 August 1982 in Perth, Western Australia) is an Australian netball player. She represented the national squad from 2002 to 2004, and was a member of the open squad in 2005 and 2006. Shynn played franchise netball in the Commonwealth Bank Trophy for her home team Perth Orioles from 1999 to 2006. In 2006 she came down with a knee injury and has an undecided future in the game. She did not play in the new Trans-Tasman league, the ANZ Championship (now exists as an Australian league, the Suncorp Super Netball ).Shynn has nine test caps for Australia.
