= Nicole Cusack =

Australia netball international

Personal information
- Born: 1966 (age 59–60) Sydney

Netball career
- Playing positions: GA, GS
Years	National team	Caps
1989–1998	Australian Diamonds	52
Medal record
Representing Australia
World Netball Championships
Gold medal – first place	1995 Birmingham	Team
Commonwealth Games
Gold medal – first place	1998 Kuala Lumpur	Team

Nicole Cusack (born 1966) is a former Australian netball player. After Marcia Ella, she became the second indigenous Australian to represent the Australian Diamonds in 1989. After her playing retirement, she became a leading netball coach.

== Personal ==
Cusack was born in 1966 and grew up in the Liverpool district, Sydney.

== Netball ==
Prior to taking up netball, Cusack competed at the Australian Age Group Swimming Championships in 1979 and 1980 competing in the 100m and 200m backstroke. She also played basketball in Sydney for the Bankstown Bruins in 1987 and 1988.

Playing in the Randwick Netball Association competition, Cusack was selected in the NSW 17/U team in 1982. In 1983, she was selected as goal attack for the New South Wales team at the U19 Australian Netball Championships. She held an Australian Institute of Sport netball scholarship in 1984 and 1985. While at the AIS, she was selected for the Australian U21 team.

Cusack debuted for the Australian Diamonds against New Zealand on 26 April 1989 in Auckland. She was a member of the Australian Diamonds that competed at the 1990 Commonwealth Games as a demonstration sport. Cusack played 52 times for the Australian Diamonds and won gold medals at the 1995 World Netball Championships and the 1998 Commonwealth Games. She played for Sydney Sandpipers (1997) and the Melbourne Kestrels (1998) in the Commonwealth Bank Trophy. She retired after the 1998 Commonwealth Games.

After retiring as a player, Cusack continued her involvement as a netball coach. Positions held include Assistant Coach NSW Swifts (2001), AIS Netball Scholarship Coach (2008–2009), Australian U21's World Champion Assistant Coach (2010), Australian Diamonds specialists Coach (2008–12), Queensland Firebirds Specialist Coach (2010–14) and South Africa Proteas Assistant Coach (2015–19).

== Recognition ==
- New South Wales Hall of Champions
- Netball New South Wales Hall of Fame (2007)
- Aboriginal and Torres Strait Islander Sports Hall of Fame
