= Camilla Lees =

New Zealand netball player

Personal information
- Born: 27 March 1989 (age 37) Pukekohe, Auckland, New Zealand
- Height: 1.77 m (5 ft 9 1/2 in)
- University: University of Otago

Netball career
- Playing positions: C, WA, WD
Years	Club team	Apps
2009–present	Central Pulse	
Years	National team	Caps
2005–06	NZ Secondary Schools	
2007–09	NZ U21	
2008–09	NZ Accelerant Group	
2009, 2011	Silver Ferns	3
2010	Fastnet Ferns	5
Medal record
Representing New Zealand
World Netball Series
Gold medal – first place	2010 Liverpool	Fastnet
Silver medal – second place	2011 World Netball Series	Fastnet
- Updated on 23 January 2011

Camilla Lees (born 27 March 1989 in Pukekohe, New Zealand) is a New Zealand netball player.

Lees made her debut in the ANZ Championship with the Central Pulse in 2009, after initially being considered for the Canterbury Tactix. She made the New Zealand U21 team in 2007, and won a silver medal with the team at the 2009 World Youth Netball Championships in the Cook Islands. Her performance in the Pulse midcourt also earned her a spot in the Silver Ferns that year, and the FastNet Ferns the following year. She was recalled to the Silver Ferns for the 2011 test series against England as cover for the injured Grace Rasmussen.

After the retirement of Temepara George and Liana Leota, she was selected into the Silver Ferns for the 2012 season, as the side's top WA. She played all three tests of the 2012 Constellation Cup, which the Ferns won. She had to miss the first three tests of the Quad Series due to her study commitments, where the Ferns slumped to a twenty-goal loss without her. She was back for the next test against Australia, which ended up a much improved performance and a six-goal win.

She has studied Medicine throughout her netball career, and graduated at the end of 2012.

Following the conclusion to the 2014 ANZ Championship Lees signed to play with the Northern Mystics for the following season.

In 2015 she announced that she will no longer participate in the netball tournaments due to her medical career and therefore retires.
