= Tracey Pemberton =

Australian netball player

Personal information
- Born: 4 June 1981 (age 45)
- Occupation: Netball development officer
- Height: 1.81 m (5 ft 11 in)

Netball career
- Playing positions: GA, GS
| Years | Club team | Apps |
| 2008 | West Coast Fever | |
| 1999–2000, | Perth Orioles | 13 |
- Updated on 2009-03-28

Tracey Pemberton (born 4 June 1981) is an Australian netball player. She played for the West Coast Fever in the ANZ Championship, previously playing for the Perth Orioles in the Commonwealth Bank Trophy.
