= Doncaster Secondary College =

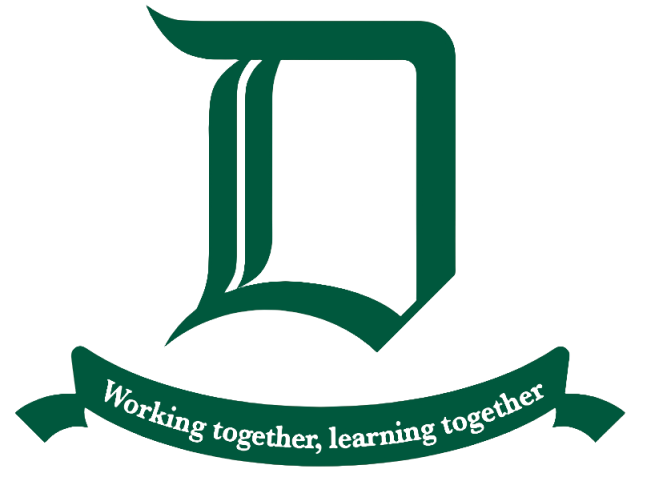

Location
- Doncaster, Victoria; Australia; 37.7844°S 145.1371°E

Information
- Type: State government high school
- Motto: English: Working Together, Learning Together; Latin: Manu et Mente (Hand and Mind)
- Established: 5 February 1969
- Principal: Glenn Morris
- Grades: Year 7 to 12
- Enrolment: Approximately 1300
- Colours: Ecru, myrtle, maroon
- Yearbook: Cornucopia
- Publications: Weekly newsletter Annual yearbook
- Website: www.doncastersc.vic.edu.au

Doncaster Secondary College is a secondary school located in the Melbourne suburb of Doncaster.

Founded on 5 February 1969, the school adopts a non-selective enrolment policy and caters for over 1500 students from Year 7 to 12 – making it the largest high school in the city of Manningham. Senior students have access to a comprehensive Victorian Certificate of Education (VCE) curriculum in addition to Vocational Education and Training (VET) and the Victorian Certificate of Applied Learning (VCAL) units. In 2023, the school ranked 119th in Victoria (or 30th among Victorian public schools) by the percentage of study scores of 40 and above.

The college is characterised by its diverse student population with a representation of nearly fifty nationalities, incorporating the 70 full fee-paying international students enrolled in the International Student Program. The majority of international students are from China, Korea and Southeast Asia. 33% of the student body speaks a language other than English at home.

Doncaster Secondary College is affiliated with School Sports Victoria (SSV) and competes within the Eastern Zone at regional sporting events including athletics, soccer, basketball and swimming.

== Notable former students ==
- Robbie Gray – AFL footballer
- Julie Corletto- Netballer
