= Jane Altschwager =

Australia netball player (born 1980)

Personal information
- Born: 25 August 1980 (age 46) Millicent, South Australia
- Height: 1.93 m (6 ft 4 in)
- School: Pembroke School
- University: University of South Australia

Netball career
- Playing positions: GS, GA
Years	Club team	Apps
1999–2000	Adelaide Thunderbirds	5
1999	→ Contax	
2000–2001	Australian Institute of Sport	
2001–2004	Sydney Swifts	50
2005–2007	Hunter Jaegers	26
2009	Adelaide Thunderbirds	
2010	Central Pulse	
2011	Newton Jaguars	
Years	National team	Caps
2000–2005	Australia	7

Jane Altschwager (born 25 August 1980) is a former Australia netball international. During the Commonwealth Bank Trophy era, Altschwager made 81 senior appearances for Adelaide Thunderbirds, Sydney Swifts and Hunter Jaegers. Between 1999 and 2004, she was a member of three premiership winning squads – 1999 with Thunderbirds and 2001 and 2004 with Swifts. During the ANZ Championship era she re-joined Thunderbirds and also played for Central Pulse. Altschwager captained both Jaegers and Pulse. After retiring as a netball player, Altschwager went on to play women's Australian rules football for North Adelaide in the SANFL Women's League.

== Early life and education ==
Altschwager was born in Millicent, South Australia. Between 1995 and 1997 she attended Pembroke School. Between 1999 and 2001 she attended the University of South Australia where she gained a BA in Communications and Advertising.

== Netball ==
=== South Australia state league ===
Altschwager played for both Contax and the Australian Institute of Sport in the South Australia state league. In 1999 she made her senior debut for Contax. In 2000 she was a member of the AIS team that finished as runners up to Contax in the grand final. She was also selected in the league's Team of the Year. In 2011 she returned to the South Australia state league to play for Newton Jaguars.

=== Commonwealth Bank Trophy ===
Adelaide Thunderbirds

Between 1999 and 2000, Altschwager was a member of the Adelaide Thunderbirds squad, making 5 senior appearances for the team.

Sydney Swifts

Between 2001 and 2004, Altschwager made 50 senior appearances for Sydney Swifts. She was a member of the Swifts teams that won premierships in 2001 and 2004. She played for Swifts in the 2001 grand final against Adelaide Thunderbirds, partnering Megan Anderson and scoring 27 from 32 with an 84% success rate. In 2001, while playing for Swifts, she was named the Commonwealth Bank Trophy league's Best New Talent.

Hunter Jaegers

Between 2005 and 2006, Altschwager made 26 senior appearances for Hunter Jaegers. She also captained the team during the 2005 and 2006 seasons.

=== ANZ Championship ===
Altschwager came out of retirement to play for Adelaide Thunderbirds in the 2009 ANZ Championship season. During the 2010 ANZ Championship season she captained Central Pulse. In addition to playing for Pulse, Altschwager also managed the team's website.

=== Australia ===
Between 2001 and 2004 Altschwager made 7 senior appearances for Australia. She was a member of the Australia U21 that won a gold medal at the 2000 World Youth Netball Championships. She made her senior debut for Australia on 1 April 2000 during an away game against England. She remained in the Australia squad until 2005.

== Australian rules football ==
In 2018 and 2019, Altschwager played for North Adelaide in the SANFL Women's League.

== Employment ==
Altschwager has worked in various media and communication roles, both during and after her netball career. In 2009, while playing for Adelaide Thunderbirds, she worked as producer for Australia Live TV. She also worked as a netball commentator for ABC Radio and Television. Between 2011 and 2016 she worked as a game day court announcer for Thunderbirds. Between 2016 and 2017 she worked as a marketing and communications manager for Tennis Australia at the World Tennis Challenge.

== Honours ==
Sydney Swifts

- Commonwealth Bank Trophy
  - Winners: 2001, 2004

Australian Institute of Sport

- South Australia State League
  - Runners Up: 2000
