= Ian Prendergast =

Australian rules footballer (born 1980)

Personal information
- Born: 2 September 1980 (age 46)
- Original team: Kerang Rovers / Oakleigh Chargers
- Debut: Round 17, 29 July 2001, Carlton vs. Hawthorn, at M.C.G.
- Height: 192 cm (6 ft 4 in)
- Weight: 98 kg (216 lb)

Playing career^{1}
Years	Club	Games (Goals)
2001–2006	Carlton	65 (14)
- ^{1} Playing statistics correct to the end of 2006.

Career highlights
- Carlton Pre-season premiership side 2005.

Ian Prendergast (born 2 September 1980) is an Australian rules footballer who played senior professional football with the Carlton Football Club in the Australian Football League, and formally served as the club's Chief Commercial Officer and General Counsel. He currently is a co-owner of Sports Advisory Partners Australia (SAPA).

== Playing career ==
Prendergast was recruited as the number 58 draft pick in the 1998 AFL draft from the Kerang Rovers. He was elevated to the Carlton Football Club Senior list in 2001 and made his debut in Round 17, 2001 against Hawthorn.

Prendergast earned semi-regular selection throughout his career at Carlton, typically playing about half of the season with Carlton and half with VFL-affiliate Northern Bullants. 2004 was his strongest season for selection, playing the first seventeen games of the year.

The 2005 season saw Prendergast play just 13 games but there was an early high as he was part of the club's preseason premiership win over West Coast. Perhaps his most memorable moment in a Carlton guernsey came in this game as he booted a nine-point super goal in the final quarter to effectively seal the win for the Blues. They ran out 27-point winners.

Prendergast played only three games for Carlton in 2006, partly because the club was adopting a youth policy. He spent most of the year as one of the Northern Bullants' best players. He was delisted by Carlton at the end of 2006.

After being delisted, Prendergast moved to South Australia, where he played for the South Adelaide in the SANFL in 2007 and 2008. He moved back to Melbourne in 2009, and played with the Balwyn Football Club in the Eastern Football League until 2011; he also served as assistant coach in 2011. In 2012, he was a playing assistant coach with the University Blues in the Victorian Amateur Football Association.

== Professional career ==
Prendergast studied a Bachelor of Laws at Monash University during his AFL career. Since the end of his AFL playing career, he has worked as a lawyer, both in Adelaide and in Melbourne.

Throughout his playing and non-playing career, he has been heavily involved in football workplace relations. He served as Carlton's AFL Players Association delegate from 2004 until 2006 (after serving as alternate for the two previous years). While playing in the SANFL in 2007 and 2008, Prendergast served as the CEO of the SANFL Players' Association. From 2010 until 2015, he served as the General Manager of Player Relations in the AFLPA, also serving as interim chief executive for a period in 2014. From 2015 to 2020, he was chief executive of the Rugby League Players Association. Since 2020, he has been Chief Commercial Officer and General Counsel of the Carlton Football Club.

== Personal life ==
Prendergast is the elder brother to Australian Netball Diamonds and NSW Swifts defender Julie Corletto née Prendergast.
