= Larrissa Willcox =

New Zealand netball player

Personal information
- Born: 27 November 1982 (age 43)
- Height: 1.82 m (6 ft 0 in)

Netball career
- Playing positions: GK, GD, WD
Years	Club team	Apps
2010	Northern Mystics	
2009	Canterbury Tactix	
2008	West Coast Fever	
2002–07	Perth Orioles	
Years	National team	Caps
2009	New Zealand	3
- Updated on 2009-10-22

Larrissa Willcox (born 27 November 1982) is a New Zealand netball player. She played for the West Coast Fever in the 2008 ANZ Championship season, having played for the same team in Australia's Commonwealth Bank Trophy from 2002 to 2007, when the team was known as the Perth Orioles. In 2009, she switched to New Zealand franchise the Canterbury Tactix, and that same year made her debut for the New Zealand national netball team, the Silver Ferns.

On 17 September 2009, she announced she was leaving the Canterbury Tactix and transferring to the Northern Mystics, joining fellow Silver Ferns Maria Tutaia and Joline Henry, who defected from their Waikato Bay of Plenty Magic franchise.
