= Susan Fuhrmann =

Australian netball player

Personal information
- Full name: Susan Elizabeth Fuhrmann
- Born: 30 July 1986 (age 40) Katoomba, New South Wales
- Occupation: Pharmacist
- Height: 1.96 m (6 ft 5 in)

Netball career
- Playing position: GK
| Years | Club team | Apps |
| 2004–2006 | AIS Canberra Darters | |
| 2007 | Perth Orioles | |
| 2008–2012 | West Coast Fever | |
| Years | National team | Caps |
| 2006–07, 2009–2011 | Australia | 33 |
Medal record
Representing Australia
Netball World Championships
| Gold medal – first place | 2011 Singapore | Netball |
Commonwealth Games
| Silver medal – second place | 2006 Melbourne | Netball |
| Silver medal – second place | 2010 Delhi | Netball |
World Netball Series
| Bronze medal – third place | 2009 Manchester | Fastnet |
- Updated on 2018-08-13

Susan Elizabeth Fuhrmann (born 30 July 1986), known as "the Fuhrmannator", is an Australian retired international netball player.

== Early life ==
Susan Fuhrmann was born and raised in Katoomba, New South Wales until her parents moved to Perth when she was five-years old. She was an Australian Institute of Sport scholarship holder. Fuhrmann debuted for the Australian national team in 2006, and was also a member of the Australian team that won silver at the 2006 Commonwealth Games and gold at the 2011 Netball World Championships. She used her height advantage to intimidate her opponents, especially Irene van Dyk, New Zealand's top shooter.

== ANZ Championship ==
Fuhrmann played in the ANZ Championship for the West Coast Fever, where she was the tallest player in the competition, along with Queensland Firebirds shooter Romelda Aiken, both standing at 1.96 m (6 ft 5 in). She previously played for Perth Orioles (2007) and the AIS Canberra Darters (2004–06) in the Commonwealth Bank Trophy.

== Australian Netball Diamonds ==
Fuhrmann made 33 appearances for the Australian Netball Diamonds (the national team), her last appearance being at the end of the 2011 season and she was not selected for the squad for the 2012 season. On 2 February 2013 Fuhrmann announced her retirement from netball.
