= Selina Hornibrook =

Australian netball player

Personal information
- Full name: Selina May Hornibrook (Née: Gilsenan)
- Born: 31 May 1978 (age 48)
- Occupation: IT Consultant
- Height: 1.71 m (5 ft 7 in)
- Spouse: Timothy Hornibrook (m. 2006)
- Children: 4
- School: Woolooware High School

Netball career
- Playing positions: C, WD
Years	Club team	Apps
2008	New South Wales Swifts	
Years	National team	Caps
2005–07	Australia	
Medal record
Representing Australia
Netball World Championships
Gold medal – first place	2007 Auckland	Netball
Commonwealth Games
Silver medal – second place	2006 Melbourne	Netball
- Updated on 2009-03-16

Selina May Hornibrook (née Gilsenan born 31 May 1978) is a retired Australian netball player. Hornibrook has Rotuman ancestry from her mother.

== Career ==
After a successful year playing in the Commonwealth Bank Trophy premiership-winning team in 2001, national selectors identified Hornibrook's talent and she received her first invitation to join the Australian squad in 2002. However it was not until early 2005 that she received her first call up to the Australian open team, making her debut in a match against England, which Australia won by 40 goals.

A rib injury forced Hornibrook out of Australian team contention for the next international test series, but she fought her way back into contention in late 2005, and has been a permanent member of the team ever since. She was one of Australia's best on court in a silver-medal-winning performance in the 2006 Commonwealth Games final, and after a sterling performance against New Zealand mid-year, cemented her position as Australia's first-choice wing defence.

Hornibrook is noted for her speed and persistence, being nicknamed "the rash" by some opponents. She has been an integral member of the Sydney Swifts national league team since 2000, and has played a key role in their four premierships (2001, 2004, 2006 and 2007). She was named the best player on court in the 2007 grand final. Hornibrook has been recognised as a versatile player and natural athlete. She has notably played alongside fellow Australian representatives Liz Ellis and Mo'onia Gerrard.

After a short but very successful career with the Australian team, Hornibrook announced her retirement from international netball after Australia won the 2007 World Netball Championships along with Laura von Bertouch and Liz Ellis. In 2008, Hornibrook then played in the inaugural ANZ Championship for the New South Wales Swifts as vice-captain for the team. Gilsenan was one of the starting seven players for the Swifts to be part of the Grand Final, where the Swifts became the inaugural winners of the ANZ Championship. After the ANZ Championship, she announced her complete retirement from netball to focus on starting a family.

In 2015 Selina got inducted into Netball NSW Hall of Fame.

== Personal life ==
On 21 October 2006, Selina married Timothy Hornibrook (Tim Hornibrook).

On 6 July 2009, Hornibrook gave birth to a baby boy, Connor Sean. Former Swifts player Alison Broadbent gave birth to a baby girl one day later. On 15 December 2010, Selina gave birth to her second son, Isaiah Tascar. A third boy, Kobi Christopher was born on 19 July 2014. A fourth son, Harrison Thomas was born on the 29 December 2015.
