= Sydney Sandpipers =

Defunct Australian netball team

- Founded: 1996
- Disbanded: 2003
- Based in: Sydney
- Region: New South Wales
- Home venue: Anne Clark Netball Centre; State Sports Centre
- League: Commonwealth Bank Trophy
Uniform

Sydney Sandpipers were an Australian netball team based in Sydney. Between 1997 and 2003, they represented Netball New South Wales in the Commonwealth Bank Trophy league. Together with Sydney Swifts and Hunter Jaegers, they were one of three teams to represent NNSW in the competition. In 1997 Sandpipers were founder members of the league. They continued to play in the competition until 2003, when they were replaced by Hunter Jaegers.

== Commonwealth Bank Trophy ==
Between 1997 and 2003, Sydney Sandpipers played in the Commonwealth Bank Trophy league. Together with Adelaide Ravens, Adelaide Thunderbirds, Melbourne Kestrels, Melbourne Phoenix, Perth Orioles, Queensland Firebirds and Sydney Swifts, Sandpipers were one of the founding members of the league. The majority of the teams were named after native Australian birds. The team was initially referred to as Sydney Eagles before been re-named Sydney Sandpipers after the sandpiper. Together with Sydney Swifts and Hunter Jaegers, Sandpipers were one of three teams to represent Netball New South Wales in the competition.

Sydney Sandpipers best performance in the league came in 2000. With a team featuring Natalie Avellino and Joanne Morgan, they finished third in the regular season, above their neighbours, Sydney Swifts. Sandpipers continued to play in the competition until 2003. NNSW withdrew the team from the competition, saying it was unable to support a second Sydney-based team. NNSW successfully applied to replace Sandpipers with a new team based outside the Sydney metropolitan area and in 2004 they were replaced by the Newcastle-based Hunter Jaegers.

Regular season statistics

Season	Position	Won	Lost	Drawn
1997	4th	7	7	0
1998	6th	4	9	1
1999	6th	3	11	0
2000	3rd	9	4	1
2001	4th	9	5	0
2002	5th	7	6	1
2003	5th	5	9	0

== Home venues ==
In 1997 Sandpipers played their home games at the Anne Clark Netball Centre in Lidcombe. In 1998 they moved to the State Sports Centre.

== Notable former players ==
=== Internationals ===
Australia

- Megan Anderson
- Natalie Avellino
- Nicole Cusack
- Sharon Finnan
- Mo'onia Gerrard
- Alex Hodge
- Sue Kenny
- Joanne Morgan
- Susan Pratley
- Carissa Tombs

England

- Abby Teare

=== Captains ===
Captains	Years
Sue Kenny	1997–1998
Carissa Tombs	1999
Joanne Morgan	2000–2003 ^{(Note 1)}
Natalie Avellino	2001–2002 ^{(Note 1)}

Notes

- ^1 In 2001 and 2002, Joanne Morgan and Natalie Avellino were co-captains.

=== Most Appearances ===
Players	Matches
Natalie Avellino	71
Joanne Morgan	68
Mo'onia Gerrard	67
Danielle Harvey	53
Nicole McMahon	51
Katrina McCaffery	37
Kirsten Moore	36
Christine O'Connor	34
Penny Wannop	29
Alison Tucker	27
Kristy Doyle	27
Sharon Finnan	27
Alex Hodge	26
Carissa Tombs	25
Vicki Roberts	25

=== Award winners ===
Best New Talent

Season	Player
1999	Mo'onia Gerrard

== Head coaches ==
Coach	Years	Matches	Won	Lost	Drawn	Win %
Margaret Corbett	1997–2000	43	14	28	1	33%
Lenore Blades	2000–2001	30	18	11	1	60%
Anita Keelan	2002–2003	28	12	15	1	43%

== Sponsorship ==
Sponsors	Seasons
Decoré	1997–2003 ?
Sydney University	2001
