= Kristy Doyle =

Australian netball player

Kristy Doyle (born 8 December 1980) is an Australian netball player.

She showed early promise as a shooter for the New South Wales state team in 1998, making the Australian 21 and under squad in the same year as a 17-year-old. She represented the Sydney Sandpipers in the national Commonwealth Bank Trophy in 1998 and 1999, and impressed enough that she was awarded a scholarship to the Australian Institute of Sport in 2000. This saw Doyle spend two years training at the AIS and playing in the AIS team in the South Australian state league, the Dairy Farmers Cup. She was ultimately chosen as the vice-captain of the national 21 and under team and promoted to captain in 2001.

After two relatively successful years at the Australian Institute of Sport, Doyle was widely seen as a rising star of the competition, and was recruited by the Melbourne Kestrels for the 2002 season.
