= Joanne Morgan (netball) =

Australian netball player

Personal information
- Born: Sydney
- Occupation: Teacher/Netballer
- Height: 1.90 m (6 ft 3 in)

Netball career
- Playing position: GS
Years	Club team	Apps
2006–08	Queensland Firebirds	
2004	Western Flyers (NZL)	
2002–03	Sydney Sandpipers	
Years	National team	Caps
	Australian Diamonds	1
- Updated on 2009-03-25

Joanne Morgan is an Australian netball player. Morgan was an Australian Institute of Sport scholarship holder. She was Captain for the Sydney Sandpipers and Captain of NSW and also a member of the Queensland Firebirds in the Commonwealth Bank Trophy, with a stint in the New Zealand National Bank Cup in 2004, playing for the Western Flyers. Morgan continued to play with the Firebirds with the start of the ANZ Championship in 2008. During her time with the Sydney Sandpipers and the Queensland Firebirds, Morgan scored more than 4000 goals and is the third highest goal scorer of all time (behind Catherine Cox and Sharelle McMahon). Morgan is also a former Australian international, playing one test against New Zealand in 1996 in Adelaide. After being dropped from the Firebirds following the 2008 season, she initially signed though with the Canterbury Tactix franchise in New Zealand. However, her position in that team was rejected by Netball New Zealand. She was also considered for the Southern Steel in 2009 to replace former international Jenny-May Clarkson, who retired due to work commitments, but Morgan was not signed. Morgan continued to play in the Queensland State League for the Golden South Jaguars and in 2015 played Australian Netball League as an import player for the Territory Storm. Morgan currently works as a high school physical education teacher at Helensvale State High School on the Gold Coast. She is also a Queensld State managerial.
