= Adelaide Ravens =

Defunct Australian netball team

- Founded: 1996
- Disbanded: 2002
- Based in: Adelaide
- Region: South Australia
- Home venue: ETSA Park; Adelaide Arena
- League: Commonwealth Bank Trophy

Adelaide Ravens were an Australian netball team that, together with Adelaide Thunderbirds, represented Netball South Australia in the Commonwealth Bank Trophy league. In 1997 Ravens were founder members of the league. In 1999 they were grand finalists. They continued to play in the competition until 2002, when they were replaced by AIS Canberra Darters.

== History ==
Between 1997 and 2002, Adelaide Ravens played in the Commonwealth Bank Trophy league. Together with Adelaide Thunderbirds, Melbourne Kestrels, Melbourne Phoenix, Perth Orioles, Queensland Firebirds, Sydney Sandpipers and Sydney Swifts, Ravens were one of the founding members of the league. The majority of the teams were named after native Australian birds. Ravens were named after the Australian raven. Ravens and Thunderbirds represented Netball South Australia and each team was assigned four state league clubs to select players from.

In 1999, with a team coached by Patricia Mickan and featuring Megan Anderson and Michelle den Dekker, Ravens finished the season as overall runners up. After finishing fourth during the regular season, Ravens defeated Kestrels 61–53 in the minor semi-final and Swifts 56–54 in the preliminary final. In the grand final they lost to 62–30 to Thunderbirds.

In August 2002, Netball Australia decided to drop Ravens from the league. They were subsequently replaced by AIS Canberra Darters.

Regular season statistics

Season	Position	Won	Lost	Drawn
1997	5th	5	9	0
1998	4th	8	6	0
1999	4th	9	4	1
2000	8th	0	13	1
2001	6th	4	10	0
2002	9th	2	12	0

Grand finals

Season	Winners	Score	Runners up	Venue
1999	Adelaide Thunderbirds	62–30	Adelaide Ravens	ETSA Park

== Home venues ==
Ravens played their home games at ETSA Park and Adelaide Arena.

== Notable former players ==
=== Internationals ===
Australia

- Megan Anderson
- Natalie Avellino
- Jenny Borlase
- Michelle den Dekker
- Kristen Heinrich

=== Captains ===
Captains	Years
Michelle den Dekker	1999–2000
Trudy Gardner-Baker	c. 2001
Danielle Grant	2002

== Head coaches ==
Coach	Years
Julie Francou	1997
Patricia Mickan	c. 1999

== Sponsorship ==
Sponsors	Seasons
Wendy's	1997–2002 ?
