= Julie Prendergast =

Australian international netball player

Personal information
- Full name: Julie Prendergast
- Born: 31 October 1986 (age 40)
- Height: 184 cm (6 ft 1/2 in)
- Children: Cooper (born 2016), Zara (born 2018), Harvey (born 2021)
- Relative: Ian Prendergast (AFL player)
- School: Doncaster Secondary College; Carey Grammar

Netball career
- Playing positions: GD, WD, GK
| Years | Club team | Apps |
| 2015 | New South Wales Swifts | 35 |
| 2012–2014 | Northern Mystics | 13 |
| 2008–2012 | Melbourne Vixens | 40 |
| 2007 | Melbourne Kestrels | |
| 2002–06 | Melbourne Phoenix | |
| Years | National team | Caps |
| 2005–2015 | Australian national team | 52 |
| 2003–04 | Australia U21 | |
Medal record
Representing Australia
Netball World Championships
| Gold medal – first place | 2007 Auckland | Netball |
| Gold medal – first place | 2011 Singapore | Netball |
| Gold medal – first place | 2015 Australia | Netball |
Commonwealth Games
| Gold medal – first place | 2014 Glasgow | Netball |
- Updated on 2009-03-27

Julie Prendergast (formerly Julie Corletto; born 31 October 1986) is an Australian former international netball player. She played for the Australian Diamonds, Melbourne Vixens and NSW Swifts. She usually played in the positions of goal defence and wing defence. She is the younger sister of former AFL footballer Ian Prendergast.

== Career ==
Prendergast started playing netball at aged 10 in her home town of Kerang. She later moved to Melbourne and played junior netball for Pinewood Netball Club in the Waverley District Netball Association. She made her Commonwealth Bank Trophy debut at the age of 16 for the Melbourne Phoenix, where her style of defence saw her named Netball Australia's best new talent. She was selected in the Australian open squad at the age of 17. In 2005 she captained the Australian U-21 team to a bronze medal at the World Youth Championships, while on the comeback trail from a stress fracture in her foot.

In 2007 Prendergast was recruited from the Melbourne Phoenix to cross-town rivals, Melbourne Kestrels. Also that year, she was named in the Australian national team to tour England in a tri-series. However, after injuring her ankle in the first minutes of the season opener, the local derby between Phoenix and Kestrels, she was forced to pull out, with Melbourne Kestrels teammate Rebecca Bulley called up in her place. But a few months later Prendergast went on to make a debut for Australia against Jamaica, and played goal defence during a subsequent Australian series win against New Zealand. In November 2007, she won her first ever world championship title, as the youngest member of the victorious Australian team.

In 2008 Prendergast signed with the Melbourne Vixens to play in the new trans-Tasman ANZ Championship. She again played for the Vixens in the 2009. She capped off the 2009 season with the ANZ Championship premiership-winning Vixens, coming runner-up in the Vixens' Best & Fairest, and being awarded the Liz Ellis Diamond, the highest and most prestigious individual honour in Australian netball, awarded to the player that has polled the most votes across the ANZ Championship and Australian Diamonds seasons. Prendergast's 2010 season was interrupted with her having to undergo knee surgery on both knees, thus missing out in representing Australia in the Commonwealth Games.

Prendergast made up for her misfortunes in 2011, returning to the Vixens team during round 5 of the 2011 season, and being named in the Diamonds Squad to represent Australia in the World Netball Championships. At the end of the 2012 ANZ championship season, she announced she was leaving the Vixens to sign with the New Zealand team the Northern Mystics in 2013 to join husband Daryl, who had re-signed with the New Zealand Breakers. She played for the Northern Mystics in 2013 and 2014. Prendergast played in the Australian Netball Diamonds 2014 Commonwealth Games team that won the gold medal.

In 2015, Prendergast was part of the New South Wales Swifts team that lost in the ANZ Championship finals to the Queensland Firebirds. She also won the gold medal playing for the Diamonds at 2015 Netball World Cup, playing with injured knees and a broken foot. Prendergast subsequently announced her retirement from international netball after the tournament.

== ANZ Championship accolades ==
- 2011 Melbourne Vixens Coaches Award

== Netball career facts ==
- 2015 World Championship gold medal
- 2014 Australian Commonwealth Games Netball Team
- 2011 World Championship gold medal (extra-time)
- 2009 Liz Ellis Diamond winner
- 2009 ANZ Championship victory with Melbourne Vixens
- 2007 World Championship gold medal
- 2005 Commonwealth Bank Trophy winner with Melbourne Phoenix
- 2004 Commonwealth Bank Trophy Best New Talent

== Personal life ==
In 2009, she married basketball player Daryl Corletto. They subsequently divorced.
