= Perth Orioles =

Defunct Australian netball team

- Founded: 1997
- Based in: Perth
- Regions: Western Australia
- Home venue: Challenge Stadium
- League: Commonwealth Bank Trophy
Uniform

Perth Orioles were an Australian netball team that, between 1997 and 2007, represented Netball Western Australia in the Commonwealth Bank Trophy. Orioles were one of the founding teams of the competition. They never finished higher than sixth in the competition's eleven seasons and finished last four times. In 2008, when the Commonwealth Bank Trophy was replaced by the ANZ Championship, Perth Orioles were rebranded as West Coast Fever.

== History ==
=== Commonwealth Bank Trophy ===
Between 1997 and 2007, Perth Orioles played in the Commonwealth Bank Trophy league. Together with Adelaide Ravens, Adelaide Thunderbirds, Melbourne Kestrels, Melbourne Phoenix, Sydney Swifts, Queensland Firebirds and Sydney Sandpipers, Orioles were one of the founding members of the league.

Regular season statistics

Season	Position	Won	Lost	Drawn
1997	6th	5	9	0
1998	8th	1	13	0
1999	7th	3	11	0
2000	6th	5	9	0
2001	7th	3	11	0
2002	8th	0	14	0
2003	8th	1	13	0
2004	8th	2	12	0
2005	6th	4	10	0
2006	6th	5	9	0
2007	7th	3	11	0

== Home venues ==
During the 2004 and 2005 seasons Perth Orioles played home games at the Challenge Stadium.

== Notable former players ==
=== Internationals ===
Australia

- Caitlin Bassett
- Kate Beveridge
- Catherine Cox
- Susan Fuhrmann
- Jessica Shynn

New Zealand

- Larrissa Willcox

=== West Coast Fever ===
- Caitlin Bassett
- Emma Beckett
- Kate Beveridge
- Catherine Cox
- Susan Fuhrmann
- Bianca Giteau
- Andrea Gilmore
- Jasmine Keene
- Janelle Lawson
- Tasha Nykyforak
- Tracey Pemberton
- Stacey Rosman
- Nikala Smith
- Larrissa Willcox

=== Captains ===
Captains	Years
Waveney Senior	1997, 1998–99, 2001
Sally Ironmonger	1998
Julie-Ann Sloan	1999
Catherine Cox	2000–2001
Joely Riding	2000
Samantha Andrews Lee	2002–2005
Helen Riolo	2006
Kodie Blay	2006
Stacey Rosman	2006–2007

=== Player of the Year ===
Player	Year
Kristen Heinrich	1999
Catherine Cox	2000
Catherine Cox	2001
Jessica Shynn	2002
Jessica Shynn	2003
Helen Riolo	2004
Nikala Smith	2005
Caitlin Bassett	2006
Caitlin Bassett	2007

=== Most appearances ===
Player	Games
Dianne Ring	88
Jessica Shynn	87
Stacey Rosman	71
Waveney Senior	67
Helen Riolo	60
Samantha Andrews Lee	58
Larrissa Willcox	56

=== Magnificent Seven ===
At the end of the 2007 season, former Perth Orioles coaches selected the best seven players that played for the team in the Commonwealth Bank Trophy era.

Player	Position
Caitlin Bassett	GS
Kerri Duff Borthen	GA
Waveney Senior	WA
Jessica Shynn	C
Helen Riolo	WD
Samantha Andrews Lee	GD
Sally Ironmonger	GK

== Head coaches ==
Coach	Years
Di McDonald	1997–1998
Gaye Teede	1999–2002
Carol Byers	2003–2006
Sue Gaudion	2007

== Sponsorship ==
Sponsors	Seasons
SmokeFree	c. 1997–1999
New Tel	2002
