= Mo'onia Gerrard =

Australian netball player

Mo'onia Gerrard OAM
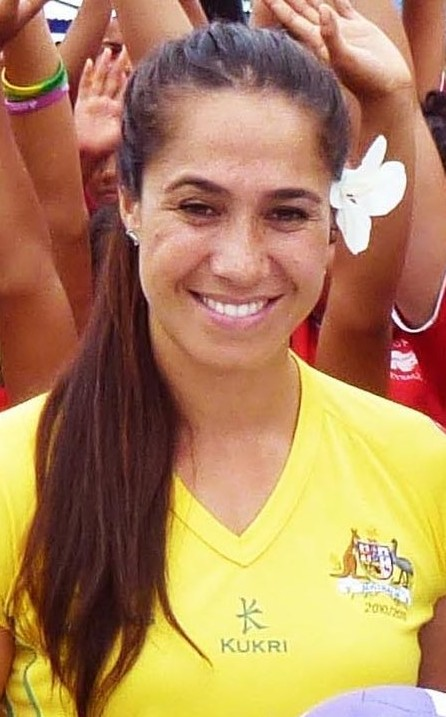
- Gerrard in Tonga 2012

Personal information
- Born: 15 November 1980 (age 46) Bathurst, Australia
- Occupation: Tan technician
- Height: 1.80 m (5 ft 11 in)
- Spouse: Dave Dennis
- Relatives: Mark Gerrard (brother); Wycliff Palu (first cousin)

Netball career
- Playing positions: GD, WD
| Years | Club team | Apps |
| 1999–2003 | Sydney Sandpipers | |
| 2004–07 | Sydney Swifts | |
| 2008–10 | Adelaide Thunderbirds | |
| 2011-13 | New South Wales Swifts | |
| Years | National team | Caps |
| 2004–2013 | Australia | 68 |
| 2023 | Tonga | |
Coaching career
- Years: Team
- 2016–2017: Severn Stars
Medal record
Representing Australia
Netball World Championships
| Gold medal – first place | 2011 Singapore | Netball |
| Gold medal – first place | 2007 Auckland | Netball |
Commonwealth Games
| Silver medal – second place | 2010 Delhi | Netball |
- Updated on 15 October 2010

Mo'onia Frances Gerrard OAM (born 15 November 1980 in Bathurst, Australia) is a former Australian netball player of Tongan descent. Her netball career commenced at a very young age; she would often participate in training sessions of her mother's senior Dee Why Beach Netball Club team. When she was old enough to register in a team, Gerrard commenced playing with Narrabeen Youth Club and was later selected to represent Manly Warringah Netball Association at State Age, State Championships and State League. She was an Australian Institute of Sport scholarship holder. Gerrard is a current member of the Australian national team, and from 2011 is playing for the New South Wales Swifts in the ANZ Championship. She is the sister of Australian rugby union player Mark Gerrard.

Gerrard is also greatly admired for her dedication to the community, mentoring younger people, promoting healthy lifestyles and sporting and personal excellence, particularly in disadvantaged communities. On 14 March 2013 the New South Wales Parliament's Legislative Council voted unanimously to commend Gerrard on her outstanding service to the community.

== Domestic career ==
In the Commonwealth Bank Trophy, Gerrard played five years with the Sydney Sandpipers and during that time received the 1999 Best New Talent Award and shared the Player's Player Award in 2003.

Late 2003 saw the demise of Gerrard's Sandpipers team, so she relocated to cross-town rivals the Sydney Swifts. Gerrard's relocation was followed by a string of serious injuries, with an ankle injury keeping her out of the 2004 season, and a knee reconstruction curtailing her comeback in 2005. This knee reconstruction also prevented Gerrard from competing at the 2006 Commonwealth Games, in which Australia lost the gold-medal match to New Zealand.

Shortly after the 2007 Netball World Championships Gerrard announced that she was relocating from Sydney to play with the Adelaide Thunderbirds in the new ANZ Championship. Gerrard played three seasons with the Thunderbirds, reaching the playoffs in all three years and winning the championship in 2010.

Later in 2010, Gerrard announced that she will return to Sydney to play for the New South Wales Swifts.

In 2011, played her first season with the Swifts since 2007. At the ANZ Championship, Gerrard played her 50th ANZ Championship match against the West Coast Fever in round 4. Gerrard also played her 150th domestic match in round 5 against the Canterbury Tactix. Both of these matches were played in Sydney. In addition, Gerrard is currently the only Australian player to have her team in the finals series with the Thunderbirds (2008-2010) and the Swifts (2011).

== International career ==
She was first selected in the Australian netball team to take on the Silver Ferns on Australian soil in November 2004. A series of injuries curtailed her participation in competitive netball throughout 2005, and forced her to miss the 2006 Commonwealth Games.

Gerrard made her comeback to competitive netball in 2006, and quickly fought her way back into the Australian team. Her strong defensive combination with Sydney Swifts teammate Liz Ellis played a major role in Australia reversing their losing streak against New Zealand in mid-2006, and Gerrard has laid claim to the goal defence position ever since.

In November 2007 Gerrard played a key role for Australia when it won the Netball World Championships beating New Zealand in Auckland. She missed the Diamonds' inaugural World Netball Series campaign in 2009 with an ankle injury, but rejoined the national team for the 2010 Commonwealth Games in Delhi, winning silver. She also played at the 2011 World Netball Championships in Singapore, primarily as a wing defence. Gerrard has earned herself 68 Test Caps for Australia.

In June 2023 she was selected for the Tonga national netball team for the 2023 Netball World Cup.

== Netball career highlights ==
- 2012-2013 NSW Swifts co-captain
- 2011 World Championship gold medal (extra-time)
- 2010 Commonwealth Games silver medallist (double extra-time)
- 2010 Australian International Player of the Year
- 2010 ANZ Championship premiership
- 2008 Liz Ellis Diamond winner
- 2006, 2007 Back to back titles with Sydney Swifts
- 1998 Australian 21U netball team
