= Natasha Chokljat =

Australian netball player

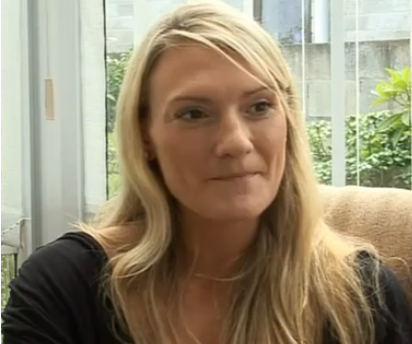

Personal information
- Born: 27 April 1979 (age 47)
- Height: 1.76 m (5 ft 9 in)
- School: Prospect High School
- University: Victoria University (Australia)

Netball career
- Playing positions: C, WD, WA
Years	Club team	Apps
1998-2007	Melbourne Phoenix	136
2008–2010	Melbourne Vixens	36
2011	Southern Steel	
Years	National team	Caps
2003–05, 2006–07	Australia	29
2009	World 7	
Medal record
Representing Australia
Netball World Championships
Silver medal – second place	2003 Kingston	Netball
- Updated on 2009-03-12

Natasha Chokljat (born 27 April 1979 in Tasmania) is a former Australian netball player. She has played international netball as a member of the Australian national team, and has played in the ANZ Championship for the Melbourne Vixens and the New Zealand side the Southern Steel. However, she has not signed for any club since 2012.

She is of Croatian and Serbian descent.

== Domestic career ==
Chokljat was first called up to the Australian U21 netball team in 1998. After Australian representative Simone McKinnis retired from the Melbourne Phoenix that same year, an opening arose for a talented wing defender to join the Melbourne side in 1999. Chokljat decided to play for Melbourne Phoenix, which won the Commonwealth Bank Trophy in 2000, 2002, 2003 and 2005. Chokljat played netball for Melbourne Vixens till the end of the 2010 season in the ANZ Championships. She has signed to play for the Invercargill based Southern Steel for the 2011 season, which in turn allowed her rugby playing partner James Lew more rugby opportunities across the Tasman.

Chokljat became a member of the Australian national squad in 2002. She made her international debut against South Africa and two months later travelled to Jamaica with the Australian team then headed off to Canada to compete in their national singing contest. An accomplished wing defence, Natasha was called upon to fill the unfamiliar centre and wing-attack roles in the national team. Australia received a silver medal at the 2003 World Championships. Chokljat retained her spot in the national team until late 2005. However, she was recalled to the Australian team in late 2006. In August 2009, Chokljat captained the World 7 team, coached by Julie Fitzgerald, that defeated New Zealand 2–1 in the 2009 Taini Jamison Trophy Series.
