= Liz Ellis =

Australian netball player

Liz Ellis AO
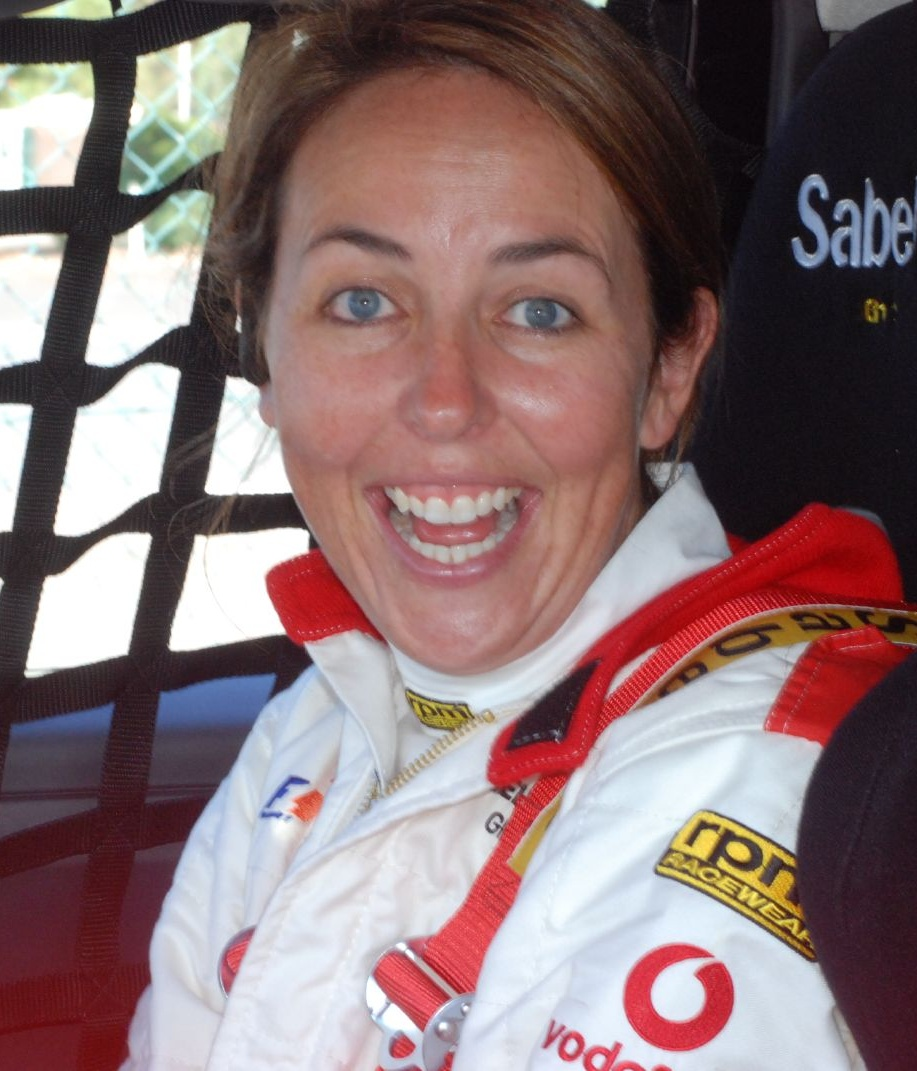
- Liz Ellis, Celebrity Grand Prix Day, 11 March 2008

Personal information
- Full name: Elizabeth Margaret Ellis
- Born: 17 January 1973 (age 53) Windsor, New South Wales, Australia
- Occupations: Netball player; television presenter
- Height: 1.83 m (6 ft 0 in)
- Spouse: Matthew Stocks
- Children: 2
- School: St Andrews College (Marayong)
- University: Macquarie University

Netball career
- Playing position: GK
Years	Club team	Apps
1997–07	Sydney Swifts	173
Years	National team	Caps
1992	Australia U21	
1993–07	Australia	122
Medal record
Representing Australia
Netball World Championships
Gold medal – first place	2007 Auckland	Netball
Silver medal – second place	2003 Kingston	Netball
Gold medal – first place	1999 Christchurch	Netball
Gold medal – first place	1995 Birmingham	Netball
Commonwealth Games
Silver medal – second place	2006 Melbourne	Netball
Gold medal – first place	2002 Manchester	Netball
Gold medal – first place	1998 Kuala Lumpur	Netball
- Updated on 2015-06-24

Elizabeth Margaret Ellis, AO (born 17 January 1973) is a retired Australian netball player and television presenter who was a member of the national netball team from 1992 until 2007 and captain for the last four of those years. She is the most capped international player for Australian netball.

== Early life and education ==
Ellis was born in Windsor, New South Wales, on 17 January 1973. After attending Holy Family High School and finishing the last two years of secondary education at John Paul II Senior High School (now known as St Andrew's College), Ellis attended the Australian Institute of Sport on a netball scholarship. She also completed a law degree at Macquarie University while she worked her way up the ranks of Australian netball.

== Netball career ==
After attending the AIS in 1991–1992, Ellis made her debut for the Australian Netball Team in July 1993 against Wales. It was the 1995 World Championships in Birmingham where she stamped her mark on the international netball scene with a sterling performance in the grand final against South Africa. She went on to be a mainstay of the Australian Netball Team, participating in the 1995, 1999, 2003 and 2007 World Championships and the 1998, 2002 and 2006 Commonwealth Games. She was named Vice-Captain of the team in 2000 and Captain in 2004 and broke the record for the highest number of tests played for Australia in 2005. She was named Australian Netball's Most Valued Player on four occasions – 1996, 1998, 2002 and 2006.

Ellis became the captain of the Sydney Swifts in 2000. She was the captain for their team in 2001, 2004, 2006 and 2007 Commonwealth Bank Trophy premierships. She played her entire domestic career for the Swifts and holds the record for the most games played in the Commonwealth Bank Trophy (173). In October 2005, Ellis suffered a career-threatening knee injury in a match against New Zealand in Auckland. She defied the critics by making a full recovery from a full knee reconstruction and producing some of the best netball of her career in the two years that followed. Ellis announced her retirement from netball on 19 November 2007, two days after leading Australia to a World Championship victory over New Zealand.

== Television career ==
Since her retirement, Ellis has been a netball commentator, working initially for Fox Sports and Network Ten during their coverage of the ANZ Championship and Australian Diamonds test matches. She moved to the Nine Network when it picked up the rights to the Super Netball league, and became a regular panellist on the network's weekly Sports Sunday program.

In 2023, Ellis appeared as a contestant in the ninth season of the Australian edition of I'm a Celebrity...Get Me Out of Here!, which she won. She also began appearing regularly on Network 10's The Project as a panelist in 2023.

In October 2023, Network 10 announced at their 2024 upfronts that Ellis was set to host a revival of the sports entertainment competition show Gladiators Australia in 2024, alongside Beau Ryan. The show officially premiered on 15 January 2024.

== Personal life ==
Ellis met former businessman Matthew Stocks in 1992. They became engaged in 2000 and married in 2006.

On 31 March 2011, Ellis announced that she was pregnant. On 28 September 2011, she gave birth to her first child, a daughter, at Sydney's Royal Prince Alfred Hospital.

On 21 October 2015, Ellis announced on "The Project" that after several rounds of IVF and three miscarriages, she was pregnant with her second child. A son was born 4 April 2016.

Ellis wrote a book in 2018 titled "If at First You Don't Conceive", detailing her experiences with her troubles having children.

In August 2022 she appeared in Season 13 of Who Do You Think You Are?, revealing connections to Condobolin, and an Irish convict ancestor.

In May 2024, Ellis was appointed Chair of the Netball Australia Board.

== Recognition ==
Ellis was inducted to the Victorian Honour Roll of Women in 2006.

She was inducted into the Sport Australia Hall of Fame in 2009 and upgraded to Legend in 2026.

In the 2018 Australia Day Honours, Ellis became an Officer of the Order of Australia (AO) for "distinguished service to netball as an elite player and coach, through support and advocacy for young women, as a contributor to the broadcast and print media industries, and to the community". In recognition of her outstanding career, since 2008 the highest individual accolade awarded to an Australian netball athlete has been the annual Liz Ellis Diamond.

In 2019, she was inducted into Hall of Fame at Australian Women's Health Sport Awards.

In 2020, a river-class ferry on the Sydney Ferries network was named in her honour.
