= Commonwealth Bank Trophy =

Defunct netball league in Australia

- Founded: 1997
- Folded: 2007
- Replaced by: ANZ Championship
- No. of teams: 8
- Country: Australia
- Last champion: Sydney Swifts (4th title)
- Most titles: Melbourne Phoenix (5 titles)
- Sponsor: Commonwealth Bank

The Commonwealth Bank Trophy, also referred to as the National Netball League, was the top level national Australian netball league between 1997 and 2007. The league was organized by Netball Australia. Its main sponsor was the Commonwealth Bank. Melbourne Phoenix were the competition's most successful team, winning five premierships. Sydney Swifts were the second most successful team, winning four premierships. Between them, Phoenix and Swifts played in every grand final, except in 1999 when Adelaide Thunderbirds won the second of their two premierships. Ahead of the 2008 season, the Commonwealth Bank Trophy league effectively merged with New Zealand's National Bank Cup to form the ANZ Championship.

== Teams ==
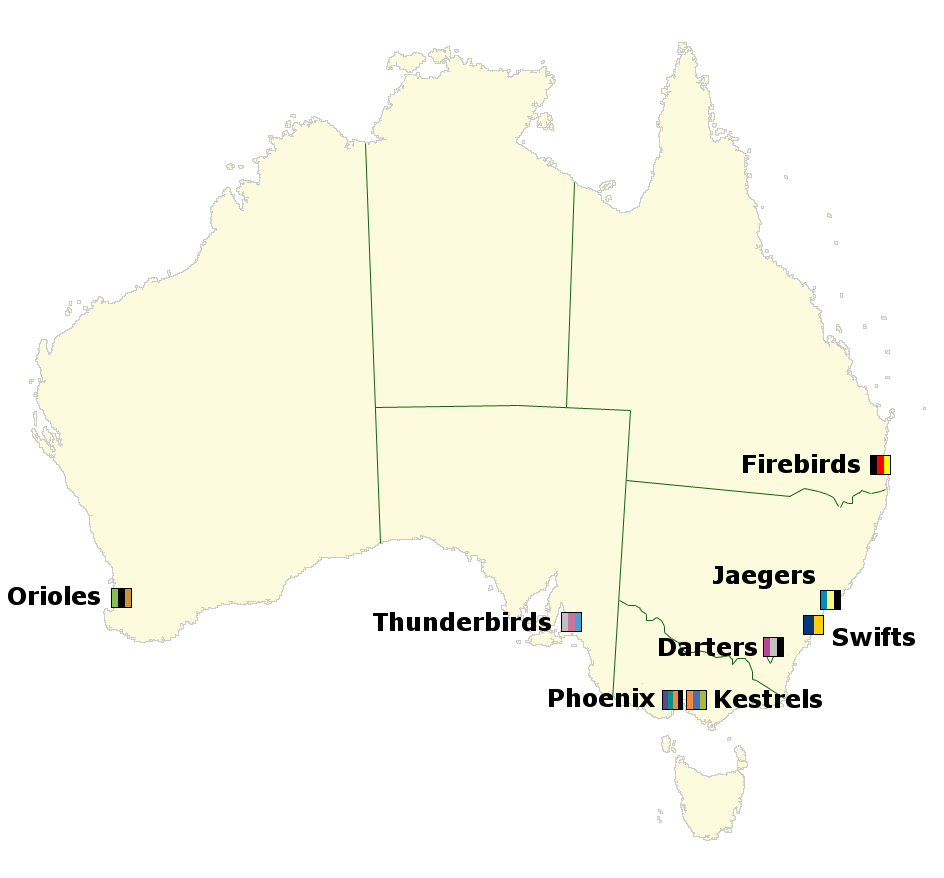
Locations of teams

The founding members of the Commonwealth Bank Trophy league included Adelaide Ravens, Adelaide Thunderbirds, Melbourne Kestrels, Melbourne Phoenix, Perth Orioles, Sydney Sandpipers, Sydney Swifts and Queensland Firebirds. The majority of the teams were named after native Australian birds including ravens, kestrels, orioles and sandpipers. Adelaide Thunderbirds were initially going to be named Adelaide Falcons but the name was changed at the request of the rugby union team. In 2003 Ravens were replaced by AIS Canberra Darters and in 2004 Sandpipers were replaced by Hunter Jaegers.

In 2008, when the Commonwealth Bank Trophy league was replaced by the ANZ Championship, Thunderbirds and Firebirds became founders of the new league. Several other Commonwealth Bank Trophy teams were transformed to form ANZ Championship teams. Swifts and Jaegers merged to become New South Wales Swifts, Kestrels and Phoenix merged to become Melbourne Vixens and Orioles were rebranded as West Coast Fever. Meanwhile, the Australian Institute of Sport and Canberra Darters ended their partnership and in 2008 entered two separate team in the Australian Netball League.

=== 2007 teams ===
Team	Home venue/base	State/Territory
Adelaide Thunderbirds	Netball SA Stadium	South Australia
AIS Canberra Darters	AIS Arena	Australian Capital Territory
Hunter Jaegers	Newcastle Entertainment Centre	New South Wales
Melbourne Phoenix	Parkville Stadium	Victoria
Melbourne Kestrels	Parkville Stadium; Waverley Netball Centre	Victoria
Perth Orioles	Challenge Stadium	Western Australia
Queensland Firebirds	Chandler Arena	Queensland
Sydney Swifts	Sydney SuperDome; State Sports Centre; Wollongong Entertainment Centre	New South Wales

=== Earlier teams ===
Team	Region	Debut season	Final season	Replaced by
Adelaide Ravens	South Australia	1997	2002	AIS Canberra Darters
Sydney Sandpipers	New South Wales	1997	2003	Hunter Jaegers

== Grand finals ==
Season	Winners	Score	Runners up	Venue
1997	Melbourne Phoenix	58–48	Adelaide Thunderbirds	The Glasshouse
1998	Adelaide Thunderbirds	48–42	Sydney Swifts	Netball SA Stadium
1999	Adelaide Thunderbirds	62–30	Adelaide Ravens	Netball SA Stadium
2000	Melbourne Phoenix	52–51	Adelaide Thunderbirds	The Glasshouse
2001	Sydney Swifts	57–32	Adelaide Thunderbirds	State Sports Centre
2002	Melbourne Phoenix	49–44	Adelaide Thunderbirds	John Cain Arena
2003	Melbourne Phoenix	47–44	Sydney Swifts	Sydney SuperDome
2004	Sydney Swifts	52–51	Melbourne Phoenix	Sydney SuperDome
2005	Melbourne Phoenix	61–44	Sydney Swifts	John Cain Arena
2006	Sydney Swifts	65–36	Adelaide Thunderbirds	State Sports Centre
2007	Sydney Swifts	45–37	Melbourne Phoenix	Sydney SuperDome

== Minor premierships ==
Season	Winners
1997	Adelaide Thunderbirds
1998	Adelaide Thunderbirds
1999	Adelaide Thunderbirds
2000	Adelaide Thunderbirds
2001	Adelaide Thunderbirds
2002	Melbourne Phoenix
2003	Melbourne Phoenix
2004	Sydney Swifts
2005	Sydney Swifts
2006	Sydney Swifts
2007	Melbourne Phoenix

== Awards ==
=== Most Valuable Player ===
Season	Player	Team
1998	Liz Ellis	Sydney Swifts
1999	Jacqui Delaney	Adelaide Thunderbirds
2000	Sharelle McMahon	Melbourne Phoenix
2001	Jacqui Delaney	Adelaide Thunderbirds
2002	Liz Ellis	Sydney Swifts
2003	Sharelle McMahon	Melbourne Phoenix
2004	Cynna Neele	Melbourne Kestrels
2005	Sharelle McMahon	Melbourne Phoenix
2006	Liz Ellis	Sydney Swifts
2007	Sharelle McMahon	Melbourne Phoenix

=== Players' Player of the Year ===
Season	Player	Team
2001	Jacqui Delaney	Adelaide Thunderbirds
	Catherine Cox	Perth Orioles
2002	Liz Ellis	Sydney Swifts
2003	Cynna Neele	Melbourne Kestrels
	Natalie Sloane	
	Mo'onia Gerrard	Sydney Sandpipers
2004	Janine Ilitch	Melbourne Kestrels
	Raegan Jackson	Hunter Jaegers
2005	Natasha Chokljat	Melbourne Phoenix
2006	Caitlin Bassett	Perth Orioles
	Caitlin Thwaites	Melbourne Kestrels
2007	Leah Shoard	AIS Canberra Darters

=== Grand final MVP ===
Season	Player	Team
1997		
1998	Sarah Sutter	Adelaide Thunderbirds
1999	Jacqui Delaney	Adelaide Thunderbirds
2000	Sharelle McMahon	Melbourne Phoenix
2001	Liz Ellis	Sydney Swifts
2002	Sharelle McMahon	Melbourne Phoenix
2003		
2004	Catherine Cox	Sydney Swifts
2005	Bianca Chatfield	Melbourne Phoenix
2006	Liz Ellis	Sydney Swifts
2007	Selina Gilsenan	Sydney Swifts

=== Best New Talent ===
Season	Player	Team
1998	Natalie Sloane	Queensland Firebirds
1999	Mo'onia Gerrard	Sydney Sandpipers
2000	Cynna Neele	Melbourne Kestrels
2001	Jane Altschwager	Sydney Swifts
2002	Mandy Edwards	Adelaide Thunderbirds
2003	Carla Dziwoki	Queensland Firebirds
2004	Julie Prendergast	Melbourne Phoenix
2005	Clare McMeniman	AIS Canberra Darters
2006	Madison Browne	Melbourne Kestrels
2007	Ashlee Howard	Melbourne Kestrels

=== Coach of the Year ===
Season	Player	Team
2004	Julie Fitzgerald	Sydney Swifts
2005	Julie Hoornweg	Melbourne Phoenix
2006	Julie Fitzgerald	Sydney Swifts
2007	Julie Fitzgerald	Sydney Swifts

=== Margaret Pewtress Team of the Year ===
Season	Team of the Year
2002	GS Eloise Southby (Melbourne Phoenix) GA Sharelle McMahon (Melbourne Phoenix) WA Laura von Bertouch (Adelaide Thunderbirds) C Rebecca Sanders WD Peta Squire (Adelaide Thunderbirds) GD Kathryn Harby-Williams (Adelaide Thunderbirds) GK Liz Ellis (Sydney Swifts)
2003	GS Catherine Cox (Sydney Swifts) GA Sharelle McMahon (Melbourne Phoenix) WA Susan Meaney (Melbourne Phoenix) C Rebecca Sanders WD Peta Scholz (Adelaide Thunderbirds) GD Liz Boniello (Melbourne Phoenix) GK Bianca Chatfield (Melbourne Phoenix)
2004	GS Catherine Cox (Sydney Swifts) GA Sharelle McMahon (Melbourne Phoenix); WA Laura von Bertouch (Adelaide Thunderbirds) C Sarah Barrett (Sydney Swifts) WD Peta Scholz (Adelaide Thunderbirds); GD Alison Broadbent (Sydney Swifts) GK Liz Ellis (Sydney Swifts)
2005	GS Catherine Cox (Sydney Swifts) GA Sharelle McMahon (Melbourne Phoenix); WA Laura von Bertouch (Adelaide Thunderbirds) C Natalie von Bertouch (Adelaide Thunderbirds) WD Natasha Chokljat (Melbourne Phoenix); GD Johannah Curran (Melbourne Phoenix) GK Bianca Chatfield (Melbourne Phoenix)
2006	GS Catherine Cox (Sydney Swifts) GA Sharelle McMahon (Melbourne Phoenix); WA Laura von Bertouch (Adelaide Thunderbirds) C Natalie von Bertouch (Adelaide Thunderbirds) WD Natasha Chokljat (Melbourne Phoenix); GD Mo'onia Gerrard (Sydney Swifts) GK Liz Ellis (Sydney Swifts)
2007	GS Catherine Cox (Sydney Swifts) GA Sharelle McMahon (Melbourne Phoenix); WA Laura von Bertouch (Adelaide Thunderbirds) C Natalie von Bertouch WD (Adelaide Thunderbirds) Peta Scholz (Adelaide Thunderbirds); GD Julie Prendergast (Melbourne Kestrels) GK Liz Ellis (Sydney Swifts)

== Television ==
ABC were the Commonwealth Bank Trophy league's official broadcast partner.
