= Melbourne Rugby League =

Australian sport competition

- Sport: Rugby league
- Formerly known as: Victorian Rugby League
- Instituted: 1951
- Inaugural season: 1952
- Number of teams: 17
- Country: Melbourne, Victoria, Australia
- Premiers: Men's: Northern Thunder (1st title); Women's: Altona Roosters (1st title) (2025)
- Most titles: St Kilda Saints RLC (10 titles)
- Website: NRL Victoria website

The Melbourne Rugby League (currently the Storm Premiership for branding reasons) is a rugby league football competition located in Melbourne, Victoria, Australia and run by NRL Victoria. As of the 2022 season, there are currently 17 competing teams across the varying age groups who are affiliated with the Melbourne Storm junior system.

The Senior competition features three men's grades and one women's grade.

== History ==
The 1914 Great Britain Lions tour of Australia and New Zealand included a match in Melbourne, the first rugby league game to be played in the state. The match between England and New South Wales drew 13,000 spectators.

The Melbourne club rugby union competition was closed at the outbreak of World War One and did not reappear when it was over. In early 1923 via the organising and direction of Harry Sunderland a Melbourne club competition playing rugby league under the Victorian Rugby League was formed. In September of 1923 a representative Victorian team (or Combined Melbourne) played Sydney University RLFC in Sydney.

Aided by experienced Australian Kangaroos and Eastern Suburbs (Sydney Roosters) player Harry Caples, in 1924 a selected Victorian XIII played Great Britain at Brunswick Street Oval in Fitzroy North (crowd 15,000) and made a tour of southern Queensland with matches against the representative teams of Brisbane, Ipswich and Toowoomba respectively.In mid 1925 another short tour was made to the Riverina district playing matches against Albury, Cootamundra and Wagga Wagga.

After the initial Melbourne competition folded at the end of 1925, the current competition was inaugurated in 1952 and has been running ever since.A representative Victorian side played against Western Australia in 1952 and twice met Tasmania in 1954.

== Clubs ==
Colours	Clubs	Location	Ground	Founded	Premierships	1st	2nd	3rd	WRL	Jnr
	Altona Roosters	Newport	Bruce Comben Reserve, Altona Meadows	1987	8 (1997, 2003, 2004, 2005, 2006, 2008, 2010, 2012)	Yes	Yes	Yes	1st	Yes
	Bendigo Crushers	Bendigo	Epsom Huntly Recreation Reserve	2024	0 (None)	—N/a	—N/a	Yes	—N/a	—N/a
	Casey Warriors	Cranbourne	Casey Fields, Cranbourne East	2010	1 (2015)	Yes	Yes	Yes	1st	Yes
	Doveton Steelers	Doveton	Betula Reserve, Doveton	2001	1 (2007)	—N/a	Yes	Yes	—N/a	Yes
	Eastern Raptors	Boronia	Colchester Reserve, Colchester Rd, Boronia	2011	0	—N/a	Yes	—N/a	—N/a	Yes
	Frankston Raiders	Frankston	Peninsula Reserve, Frankston	2015	1 (1983)	—N/a	—N/a	Yes	2nd	Yes
	Geelong Sharks	Geelong	Ervin Reserve, Newcomb	2023	0	—N/a	—N/a	Yes	—N/a	Yes
	Hume Eagles	Craigieburn	Hothlyn Drive Reserve, Craigieburn	2020	0	—N/a	—N/a	—N/a	—N/a	Yes
	Melbourne Storm	Melbourne	Casey Fields, Cranbourne East	1997	0	Yes	—N/a	—N/a	—N/a	—N/a
	Melton Broncos	Melton	Mt Carberry Reserve, Melton South	2013	0	—N/a	Yes	—N/a	—N/a	Yes
	Mernda Dragons	Lalor	Huskisson Reserve, Lalor	2015	0	—N/a	—N/a	—N/a	—N/a	Yes
	North West Wolves	Niddrie	AJ Davis Reserve, Fullarton Rd, Airport West	2010	0	—N/a	Yes	—N/a	—N/a	Yes
	Northern Thunder	Broadmeadows	Seabrook Reserve, Goulburn St, Broadmeadows	1999	1 (2025)	Yes	—N/a	Yes	—N/a	Yes
	Pakenham Eels	Officer	Comely Banks Recreation Reserve, Officer	2016	0	—N/a	Yes	—N/a	—N/a	Yes
	Peninsula Dolphins	Hastings	Hastings Park, Marina Parade, Hastings	2024	0	—N/a	—N/a	—N/a	—N/a	Yes
	South Eastern Titans	Dandenong	Greaves Reserve, Dandenong	2007	0	—N/a	—N/a	Yes	2nd	Yes
	Sunbury United Tigers	Sunbury	Langama Park, Sunbury	1992	4 (2009, 2011, 2013, 2014)	Yes	—N/a	Yes	2nd	Yes
	Sunshine Cowboys	Ardeer	More Park, Ardeer	2016	0	Yes	Yes	—N/a	2nd	Yes
	Truganina Rabbitohs	Truganina	Clearwood Drive Reserve, Truganina	2015	3 (2019, 2022, 2024)	Yes	Yes	Yes	1st	Yes
	Waverley Oakleigh Panthers	Clayton	Fregon Reserve, Clayton	1976	5 (1980, 1992, 1993, 1994, 2023)	—N/a	—N/a	Yes	2nd	Yes
	Werribee Bears	Werribee	Haines Reserve, Werribee	2008	3 (2016, 2017, 2018)	—N/a	Yes	—N/a	1st	Yes

=== Defunct Clubs ===
Colours	Clubs	Location	Ground	Founded	Defunct Year
	Ballarat Highlanders	Ballarat	Doug Dean Reserve	2000s	Moved to Central Highlands Rugby League in 2005 as Ballarat Dragons. Folded 2015.
	Berwick Bulldogs	Berwick	Greaves Reserve	1992	2007 (Replaced by South Eastern Titans)
	Canterbury RLFC	Canterbury			
	Casey Chiefs	Casey	Casey Fields, Cranbourne East	1997	2005 (Renamed Casey Sharks)
	Casey Sharks	Casey	Casey Fields, Cranbourne East	2005	2010 (Renamed Casey Warriors)
	Coburg RLFC	Coburg	Brearley Reserve	1981	1994
	Corowa Cougars	Corowa	Airport Oval, Corowa	2009	2013 (rejoined Goulburn Murray Rugby League)
	Craigieburn Phoenix	Craigieburn	Hothlyn Drive Reserve	2008	2016 (Renamed Hume City Bulldogs)
	Dandenong Knights	Dandenong	Greaves Reserve		2002
	East Sale RAAF	Sale			
	Essendon RLC	Essendon			
	Fitzroy All Blacks	Fitzroy			
	Frankston Sharks	Frankston	Ballam Park	1981	2007 Replaced
	Geelong Bulldogs	Geelong	Osborne Park	1991	1993
	Geelong Raiders	Geelong	Rippleside Park	2010	2012
	Geelong Tiger Snakes	Geelong	Friers Reserve	2004	2010 (Renamed Geelong Raiders)
	Gippsland Wildcats	Morwell	Maryvale Reserve		2002
	Hume City Bulldogs	Craigieburn	Hothlyn Drive Reserve	2016	2020 (Renamed Hume Eagles)
	Laverton RLFC	Laverton			1987 (Merged with Point Cook RLFC)
	Maroondah Magpies	Bayswater	Glen Park	2004	2007
	Melbourne University	Parkville	HG Smith Oval		2003
	Moorabbin Rams	Moorabbin	Keys Road Reserve	1965 (Rugby Union)	2007 Returned to Rugby Union
	Parkdale RLFC	Parkdale			
	Point Cook RLFC	Point Cook			
	Richmond RLC	Richmond			
	St Kilda Saints	St Kilda	Elwood Reserve		2003
	Tottenham RLFC	Tottenham			
	Wodonga Storm	Wodonga	Baranduda Recreation Reserve	2000s	2022 (left MRL in 2014 for Murray Cup)

== Men's First Grade Premiers ==
Since the commencement of the competition in 1952, the St Kilda Saints RLC have won the most premierships (10) over all, however, of the current clubs, the most premierships have been won by Altona Roosters (8).

Season	Premiers	Score	Runners-up
1952	Ballarat RAAF		
1953	Essendon RLC		
1954	Richmond RLC		
1955	Moorabbin Rams		
1956	Laverton RLFC		
1957	Richmond RLC		
1958	Canterbury RLFC		
1959	Ballarat RLFC		
1960	Ballarat RLFC		
1961	Laverton RLFC		
1962	Point Cook RLFC		
1963	Point Cook RLFC		
1964	Tottenham RLFC		
1965	Laverton RLFC		
1966	Moorabbin Rams		
1967	Point Cook RLFC		
1968	Moorabbin Rams		
1969	Moorabbin Rams		
1970	Moorabbin Rams		
1971	RAAF East Sale		
1972	Moorabbin Rams		
1973	Melbourne RLFC		
1974	Moorabbin Rams		
1975	Match Abandoned		
1976	RAAF Bombers		
1977	Moorabbin Rams		
1978	RAAF Laverton		
1979	No Record		
1980	Waverley RLFC		
1981	St Kilda Saints RL		
1982	St Kilda Saints RL		
1983	Frankston RLFC		
1984	Fitzroy All Blacks		
1985	Laverton RLFC		
1986	Parkdale RLFC		
1987	Coburg Lions		
1988	Laverton RLFC		
1989	Coburg Lions	24-18	Waverley Oakleigh Panthers
1990	Coburg Lions	20-14	St Kilda Saints RL
1991	St Kilda Saints RL	26-10	Coburg Lions
1992	Waverley Oakleigh Panthers	24-12	Peninsula
1993	Waverley Oakleigh Panthers	34-22	St Kilda Saints RL
1994	Waverley Oakleigh Panthers	20-16	St Kilda Saints RL
1995	St Kilda Saints RL	38-26	Waverley Oakleigh Panthers
1996	St Kilda Saints RL	38-18	Waverley Oakleigh Panthers
1997	Altona Roosters	28-12	St Kilda Saints RL
1998	St Kilda Saints RL	38-10	Altona Roosters
1999	St Kilda Saints RL	54-0	Waverley Oakleigh Panthers
2000	St Kilda Saints RL	26-8	Sunbury Cougars
2001	St Kilda Saints RL	58-22	Southern Sharks
2002	St Kilda Saints RL	26-14	Altona Roosters
2003	Altona Roosters	40-12	St Kilda Saints RL
2004	Altona Roosters	54-22	Southern Sharks
2005	Altona Roosters	36–16	Doveton Steelers
2006	Altona Roosters	20–12	Casey Sharks
2007	Doveton Steelers	23–22	Altona Roosters
2008	Altona Roosters	72–10	Moorabbin Rams
2009	Sunbury Tigers	48–18	Casey Sharks
2010	Altona Roosters	28–26	Sunbury Tigers
2011	Sunbury Tigers	32–26	North West Wolves
2012	Altona Roosters	25–22	Sunbury Tigers
2013	Sunbury Tigers	34–16	Altona Roosters
2014	Sunbury Tigers	48–16	Casey Warriors
2015	Casey Warriors	30–22	Werribee Bears
2016	Werribee Bears	14–10	Casey Warriors
2017	Werribee Bears	20-18	Casey Warriors
2018	Werribee Bears	12–8	Sunbury Tigers
2019	Truganina Rabbitohs	52–16	Altona Roosters
2020	Seasons Cancelled due to the COVID-19 pandemic		
2021	Seasons Cancelled due to the COVID-19 pandemic		
2022	Truganina Rabbitohs	48–12	Altona Roosters
2023	Waverley Oakleigh Panthers	28–18	Truganina Rabbitohs
2024	Truganina Rabbitohs	36–14	Sunbury Tigers
2025	Northern Thunder	32–6	Truganina Rabbitohs

== Women's First Grade Premiers ==
The NRL Victoria women's first grade competition has been run since 2015. The most premierships have been won by Werribee Bears

Season	Premiers	Score	Runners-up
2015	South Eastern Titans		
2016	Doveton Steelers		
2017	Truganina Rabbitohs	28–4	Doveton Steelers
2018	Werribee Bears	14–12	Truganina Rabbitohs
2019	Werribee Bears		
2020	Seasons cancelled due to the COVID-19 pandemic		
2021	Seasons cancelled due to the COVID-19 pandemic		
2022	Werribee Bears	10–6	Truganina Rabbitohs
2023	Casey Warriors	40–4	Werribee Bears
2024	Casey Warriors	16–12	Truganina Rabbitohs
2025	Altona Roosters	20–4	Truganina Rabbitohs

== Notable Juniors ==
Altona Roosters

- Jeremy Smith
- Gareth Widdop
- Drury Low
- Charnze Nicoll-Klokstad
- Ben Nakubuwai
- Jamayne Taunoa-Brown

Doveton Steelers

- Trent Toelau

North West Wolves

- Greg Marzhew

South Eastern Titans

- Mahe Fonua
- Francis Tualau
- Kenny Bromwich

Northern Thunder

- Young Tonumaipea
- Richard Kennar
- Sualauvi Fa'alogo

Waverley Oakleigh Panthers

- Drury Low
- Denny Solomona

Sunbury Tigers

- Dean Ieremia
- Fonua Pole
- Sione Finau

Casey Warriors

- Connor Donehue
- Kelma Tuilagi

Werribee Bears

- Najvada George

== See also ==
- Rugby league in Victoria
