= Rugby league in Victoria =

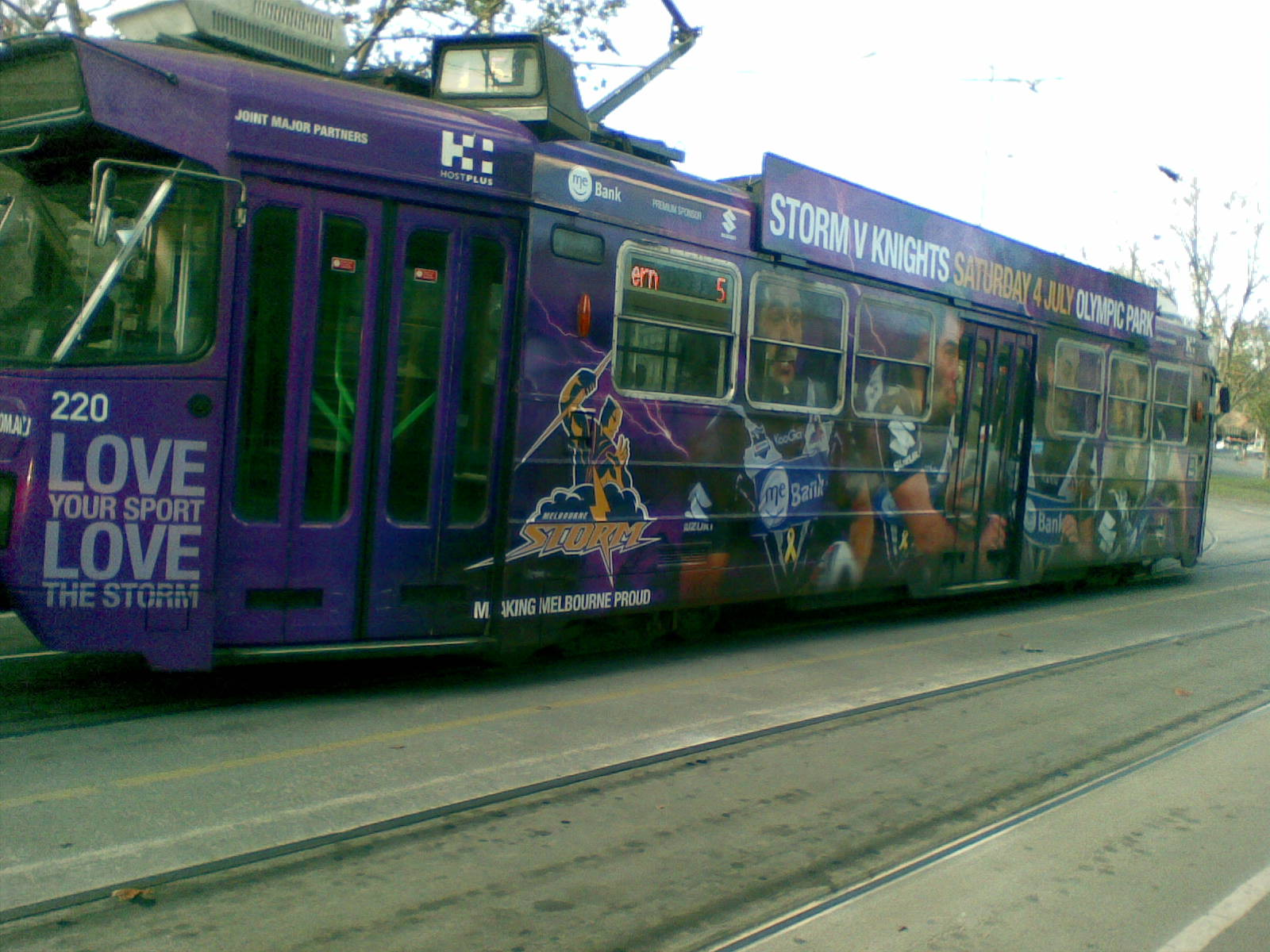
- Melbourne tram in 2009 featuring Melbourne Storm advertising livery
- Governing body: NRL Victoria
- Representative team: Victoria
- First played: 1914, Melbourne
- Registered players: 10,471 (2023); 16,000+ (including variants)
- Clubs: 25

Club competitions
- Victorian Rugby League (Melbourne Rugby League); Limestone Coast Rugby League; Murray Cup; Sunraysia-Riverlands Rugby League

Audience records
- Single match: 91,513 (2015). State of Origin – Queensland v New South Wales (MCG, Melbourne)

Rugby league football has been played and watched by people in the Australian state of Victoria since the early 20th century. While for most of its history there the game's popularity has been marginal due to the dominance of Australian rules football in Victoria, rugby league's popularity has rapidly increased in recent years in the state's capital of Melbourne, due mainly to the introduction of a professional Melbourne-based team in the national competition. The governing body is NRL Victoria.

In 1998 the first professional club, the Melbourne Storm, was established as an expansion club to join the National Rugby League premiership, the only professional rugby league club located across the Barassi Line.

The Australian Rugby League reports that over $23 million has been invested by the Melbourne Storm and its partners in promoting and developing rugby league in Victoria since 2005 and the club has visited more than 550 schools across the state. Participation has grown significantly since 2006, with more than 10,000 players across at least 25 clubs in 2024.

== History ==
=== The modern code of rugby league ===
In 1895, rugby football underwent a schism in England over the issues of expenses and payment to injured players. This led it to split into rugby union and rugby league. Luring professional sportsmen, the new code of rugby league arrived in Australia in 1907 and came to dominate the sporting scene in Queensland and New South Wales. However, it was not immediately introduced into Victoria, where Australian rules football's VFL, which paid players, was already increasingly popular. Rugby union, however, continued to be played in Victoria by a small number of amateurs.

The 1914 Great Britain Lions tour of Australia and New Zealand included a match in Melbourne, the first rugby league game to be played in the state. The match between England and New South Wales drew 13,000 spectators.

With club rugby union in Melbourne failing to returnafter World War One, in 1923 Queensland rugby league identity Harry Sunderland was instrumental in forming the Victorian Rugby League (VRL), a clubs competition and a representative Victorian XIII. Aided by experienced Australian Kangaroos and Eastern Suburbs (Sydney Roosters) player Harry Caples, in 1924 a selected Victorian XIII played Great Britain at Brunswick Street Oval in Fitzroy North (crowd 15,000) and made a tour of southern Queensland with matches against the representative teams of Brisbane, Ipswich and Toowoomba respectively. The city's first rugby league clubs included St Kilda, Melbourne, Kiwis, University, Navy and Air Force. After Sunderland returned to Queensland, in early 1926 the VRL body voted to switch codes and became the Victorian Rugby Union. Each of the clubs became rugby union clubs, including present day Melbourne Unicorns, Melbourne University RFC and Kiwi Hawthorn RUFC.

The first interstate match held in Victoria was between Western Australia and Victoria at Yarra Park in 1952.

The occasional New South Wales Rugby League Premiership match was taken to Melbourne over the following decades — the most notorious being in 1978 when Manly and Western Suburbs initiated their 'Fibros v Silvertails' battle in a preseason match held at the Junction Oval.

In 1991 the St Kilda Football Club unsuccessfully sought to have NSWRL games played at Moorabbin Oval. but the NSWRL had let Melbourne host a number of premiership games during the early 1990s; with a 1993 Western Suburbs Magpies home game against the St. George Dragons played at Olympic Park. The next season, the Sydney Tigers played two home games at Princes Park.

But attendances for the State of Origin games in the state during the 1990s had been strong. The 1990 State of Origin played at Olympic Park, attracted a capacity crowd of 25,800, and three more were held in 1994, 1995 and 1997 at the Melbourne Cricket Ground. Over those three years, 160,000 people attended; including a then Australian rugby league record crowd of 87,161 in 1994.

In 1991 the first match of the Test series between New Zealand and Australia was played at Olympic Park in front of a crowd of 26,900, the first time a rugby league test match played in Australia was held outside of New South Wales and Queensland. The next year, the second Test between Great Britain and Australia was played at Princes Park in front of a crowd of 33,005.

=== The first professional team emerges ===
In August 1991 the NSWRL began to express interest for its 1993 competition, and made a request to the Victorian Rugby League to put forward a proposal. The local league showed significant hesitation, indicating that the game had little support to build upon.

However, during 1993 ARL Chairman Ken Arthurson made it clear that he remained positive about Melbourne and thought it had much to offer. Former Melbourne CEO Chris Johns said; "John and I had been with the Broncos from day one and we had learnt first-hand how the club had progressed in 10 years to become a 'super club'. Melbourne had three times the population of Brisbane and the people down there just love their sport".

Plans to enter Melbourne gained momentum in November 1994 when both the ARL and the organisers of the (then called) News Limited rebel competition both began initiatives to fast track their own teams in the Victorian capital. In 1996, the Australian Rugby League (ARL) decided to establish a Melbourne-based team due to the high attendances at recent State of Origin matches. But in May 1997, Super League boss John Ribot pushed for a Melbourne-based club in the Super League competition, which was the rival against the ARL competition. Former Brisbane Broncos centre Chris Johns became the CEO of the club and Ribot stepped down from head of the Super League to set up the club. The club would be fully owned by News Limited who had a position of influence through their ownership in the Herald Sun, with part of its strategy to use Melbourne's most popular newspaper to provide contra media exposure for the new club. In September 1997, Melbourne announced that Chris Anderson would be their foundation coach, and then the Super League announced that their new team would be named the Melbourne Storm and it would be based at Olympic Park Stadium.

=== The new millennium ===
The 2003 NRL grand final attracted a bigger audience in Melbourne than the 2003 AFL Grand Final did in Sydney. In 2006 the deciding game of the State of Origin drew 54,833 spectators at Telstra Dome. Also that season, Melbourne's television audience for the Storm's NRL grand final appearance was higher than Sydney's was for the Swans' second successive AFL grand final appearance. This would occur again in 2016.

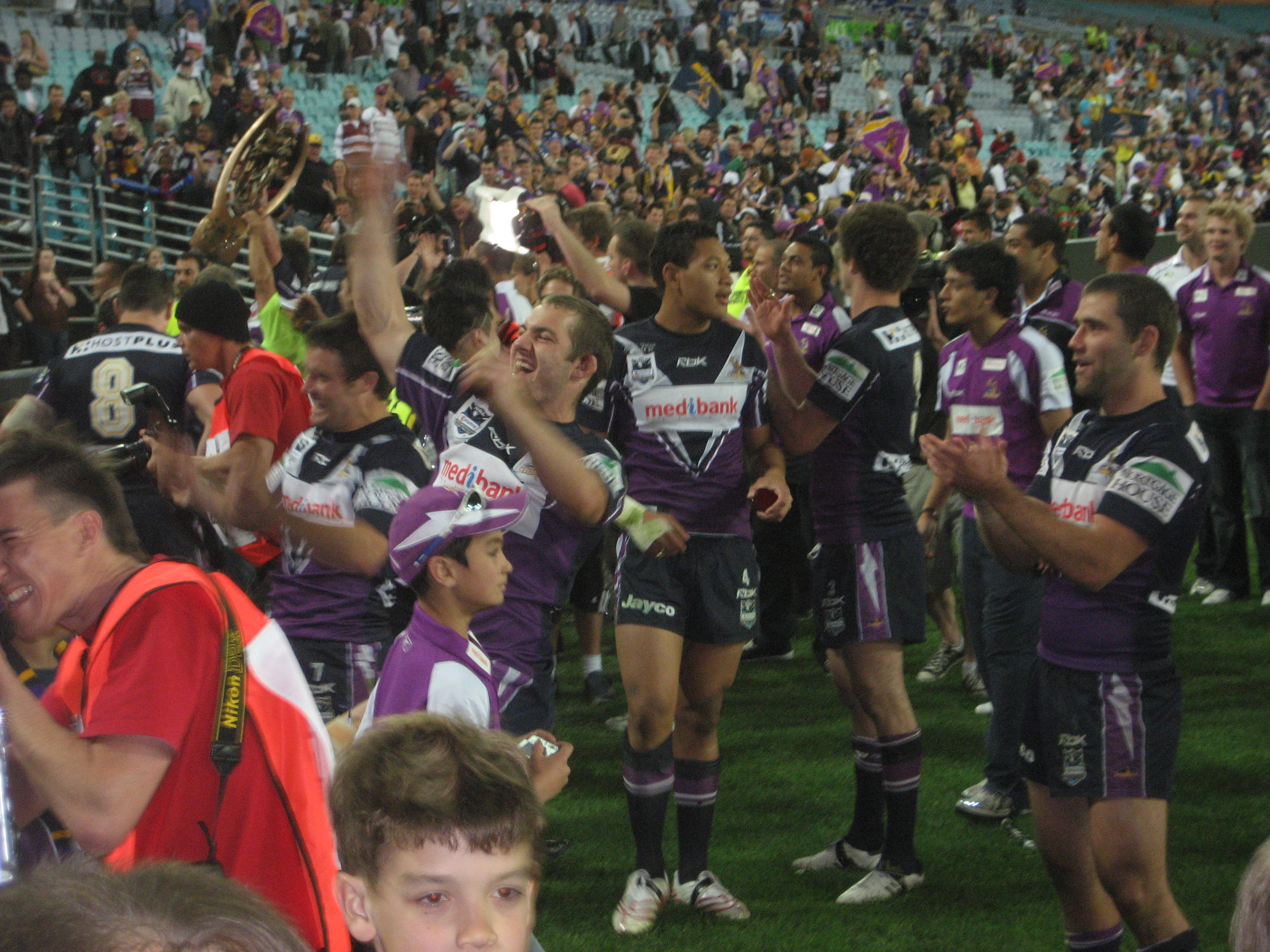
Storm players after the 2007 Grand Final.

The 2007 preliminary final between Parramatta and Melbourne Storm saw the largest ever crowd drawn by the Storm in Melbourne, 33,472. It was a larger than Manly's preliminary final crowd of 32,611.

In 2007 the Victorian Government confirmed that it would be building a new 31,500 rectangular stadium at Olympic Park, for rugby league, union and soccer.

The opening round of the 2008 season saw 20,084 spectators watch the Storm defeat New Zealand Warriors in their first game at Telstra Dome. Melbourne finished the 2008 season with a home average attendance of 12,474, considerably larger than their 2007 average of 11,711. They recorded their largest crowd average ever in the 2010 season at 14,670. For the 2008 Rugby League World Cup, the only game in Melbourne against England drew a crowd of 36,297 at the Telstra Dome. This was the second highest attended game in the competition, surpassed only by the final, played in Brisbane that drew 50,559.

2015 saw new records set for rugby league in Victoria with 91,513 spectators attending the second Origin match at the MCG, won by NSW.

The Storm who have won four premierships to date: (1999, 2012, 2017, 2020); as of 2022 regularly attract over 16,000 people to matches, and set a new club membership record of over 40,000.

In a boost for the code in Victoria, Victoria's Rugby League Centre of Excellence was constructed at Seabrook Reserve in Broadmeadows, with the $16.9 million facility opening in 2023. The facility serves as the home ground for Northern Thunder as well as the administration base for NRL Victoria and Touch Football Victoria. It additionally serves as a hub for rugby league programs, and a venue for training, camps and state and national level tournaments, and is also set to serve as the home ground of any future Melbourne Storm NRLW team. Features of the facility include a show pitch, three community access competition pitches, a female-friendly pavilion including high-performance training and recovery facilities, and car parking.

==== Local development and expansion ====
Players such as Jeremy Smith, born in New Zealand, and Gareth Widdop, born in England, have come through the junior ranks in Melbourne.

In round 23 2012, Mahe Fonua became the first Victorian-born and bred player to play in the NRL when he made his debut for Melbourne Storm. He played his junior career for South East Titans (formerly Berwick Bulldogs) in the Victorian Rugby League.

Although born in Samoa, Young Tonumaipea and Richard Kennar both emigrated to Melbourne at young ages and played their junior football with local side Northern Thunder before making their senior NRL debuts for Melbourne Storm.

The junior team (which is largely made up of Victorian locals) were runners up to the Bulldogs in the S. G. Ball Cup in 2009.

"The fabric of rugby league is built on tribalism and rivalry. That’s why we can’t rule out [a second Melbourne team]. The other reason why a second Melbourne team is good for us, is that our junior base in Victoria has expanded considerably"

— Australian Rugby League Commission chair Peter V'landys in 2023 on NRL expansion in Victoria and the addition of a second team

== Participation ==
2016	2023
10,046	10,471

=== Competitions ===
Active competition

League	Years with VIC clubs	Senior VIC clubs	Divisions	Headquarters
Victorian Rugby League	1952-			Melbourne
Melbourne Rugby League	1952-	17	5	Melbourne
Goulburn Murray Rugby League	1991-	8	1	Shepparton
Sunraysia-Riverlands Rugby League	1991-	3	1	Mildura
Super League	1997	1		Sydney, New South Wales
National Rugby League	1998-	1		Sydney, New South Wales
Central Highlands Rugby League	2005-2012	5		Ballarat
NRL Under-20s	2008-	1		Sydney, New South Wales
Limestone Coast Rugby League	2017-2022	5	1	Mount Gambier, South Australia

== Audience ==
By 2024 ten State of Origin matches held in Melbourne at an average attendance of 62,160. Attendance has grown significantly with a record 91,513 attending in 2015. Around 287,000 Victorians watched State of Origin matches on television in 2024.

The NRL audience in comparison is modest but growing. The NRL Grand Final attracted 349,000 Victorian viewers in 2023. Melbourne Storm in 2024 had an all time average attendance of 13,762 per match, growing to a record of more than 20,000 per match. Storm matches on television attract around 20,000 viewers per game in Melbourne.

=== State of Origin Attendances ===
Year	Venue	Attendance	References
1990	Olympic Park	25,800	
1994	Melbourne Cricket Ground	87,161	
1995	Melbourne Cricket Ground	52,994	
1997	Melbourne Cricket Ground	25,105	
2006	Docklands Stadium	54,833	
2009	Docklands Stadium	50,967	
2012	Docklands Stadium	56,021	
2015	Melbourne Cricket Ground	91,513	
2024	Melbourne Cricket Ground	90,084	

== Governing body ==
NRL Victoria governs rugby league in Victoria. Victoria is an Affiliated State of the overall Australian governing body the Australian Rugby League.

=== Representative Team ===
The Victoria team play in the Affiliated States Championship along with the other three affiliated states (South Australia, Tasmania, Northern Territory and Western Australia) plus the Australian Police and Australian Defence Force. In 2007 Victoria came fourth in the ARL Affiliated States Championships in Perth.

They won their first championship in 2009

== National Rugby League Teams ==
The National Rugby League (NRL) is Australia's top-level competition for the sport of rugby league. The Melbourne Storm are Victoria's only side in the League, having been initially created on the initiative of Super League for inclusion in their competition in 1997, however they did not start playing until the NRL's commencement in 1998. The club won the premiership in just its second season, 1999, and has been a powerful club for much of its existence. As of 2021, the club has won four premierships, in 1999, 2012, 2017, and 2020. It has also won the World Club Challenge in 2000, 2013, and 2018.

The club had also won three consecutive minor premierships in 2006, 2007 and 2008 and premierships in 2007 and 2009, but those titles were stripped, along with the 2010 World Club Challenge title, after the club was found guilty of breaching the salary cap.

Club	Location	Home Ground(s)	First season
Melbourne Storm	Melbourne	AAMI Park (12 games) (30,050)	1998

== Players ==
Players from Victoria who have played professionally include:

Currently playing professionally

=== Men's ===
Player	VIC junior/senior club/s	VIC Representative	Professional/Representative Years*	Connections to Victoria, References
Sualauvi Fa'alogo	Northern Thunder RLFC, Victoria Thunderbolts, Melbourne Storm	Yes	2023–present	Raised in Melbourne. Played for Melbourne Storm (2023–present)
Nick Flocas		-	2022–present	Born in Melbourne
Fonua Pole	Sunbury United	-	2022–present	Raised in, played junior football in and recruited from Melbourne.
Kelma Tuilagi	Casey Warriors	Yes	2021–present	Played junior football in Melbourne.
Greg Marzhew	North West Wolves	-	2021–present	Played senior football in Melbourne prior to professional career.
Dean Ieremia	Sunbury United, Melbourne Storm	-	2021–present	Raised in, played junior football in and recruited from Melbourne. played for Melbourne Storm (2021–present)
Jamayne Taunoa-Brown	Altona Roosters	-	2020–present	Born in, played junior football in and recruited from Melbourne.
Connor Donehue	Melbourne Storm (juniors)		2018–present	Played junior football in Melbourne
Zev John	Altona Roosters	U20 (2017)	2018–present	Played junior football in and recruited from Melbourne.
Ben Nakubuwai	Altona Roosters	-	2017–present	Played senior football in and recruited from Melbourne.
Charnze Nicoll-Klokstad	Altona Roosters, Melbourne Storm	-	2017–present	Played junior football in Melbourne as a 15 year old.
Francis Tualau	South Eastern Titans	-	2017–2018	Raised in and recruited from Melbourne.
Aaron Teroi	Northern Thunder RLFC	-	2016–2017	Born, raised in and recruited from Melbourne.
Richard Kennar	Northern Thunder RLFC, Melbourne Storm	-	2015–present	Raised in and recruited from Melbourne. Played for the Melbourne Storm (2015–16)
Young Tonumaipea	Northern Thunder RLFC, Melbourne Storm	-	2014–present	Raised in and recruited from Melbourne. Played for the Melbourne Storm (2014–18, 2022–present)
Denny Solomona	Waverley Oakleigh Panthers	-	2014–2016	Raised in and recruited from Melbourne.
Kenny Bromwich	Hallam Secondary College, Melbourne Storm (U20), Melbourne Storm		2012–present	Raised in and recruited from Melbourne. Played for Melbourne Storm (2013–22)
Mahe Fonua	Hallam Secondary College, Melbourne Storm	U15 (2006, 2007)	2012–present	Born, raised in and recruited from Melbourne. Played for Melbourne Storm (2012–15)
Gareth Widdop	Altona Roosters, Melbourne Storm	U18 (?)	2010–present	Raised in and recruited from Melbourne, played for Melbourne Storm (2010–2013)
Drury Low	Altona Roosters, Waverley Oakleigh Panthers	-	2010–2014	Raised inand played junior football in Melbourne
Selasi Berdie			2008-2009	Raised in and recruited from Melbourne
Peter Wallace	-	-	2005–2018	Born in Melbourne
Jeremy Smith	Altona Roosters, Melbourne Storm	-	2004–2016	Raised in Melbourne, played for Melbourne Storm (2004–2008)
Jake Webster	-	-	2003–2024	Born in Melbourne
Timana Tahu	-	-	1999–2014	Born in Melbourne
Craig Polla-Mounter	-	-	1992–2001	Born in Melbourne
Jamie Bloem	-	-	1992–2005	Born in Melbourne
Michael Cook	-	-	1989–1991	Born in Melbourne
Chris Kinna	-	-	1984–1989	Born in Melbourne
Frank Cottle	-	-	1940–1951	Born in Melbourne
Eric McCormack	-	-	1927–1932	Born in Melbourne
Billy Mitchell	-	-	1911–1920	Born in Melbourne

=== Women's ===
Player	VIC junior/senior club/s	VIC Representative	Professional Years*	Connections to Victoria, References
Stacey Waaka	-	-	2024–present	Raised in Melbourne
Pia Tapsell	-	-	2024–present	Born in Melbourne
Emmanita Paki	-	-	2022–present	Born in Mildura
Najvada George	Werribee Bears	-	2019–present	Born and raised in Melbourne
Karina Brown	-	-	2018–present	Born in Warragul

== See also ==
- Rugby league in Australia
- Sport in Victoria
- Barassi Line
- Rugby union in Victoria
