= Sunbury United Rugby League =

Australian rugby league team based in Sunbury, VIC

Sunbury United Rugby League Club

Club information
- Full name: Sunbury United Rugby League Club Inc.
- Nickname(s): Tigers, SURLC, The Ambush
- Colours: Orange; White; Black
- Founded: 1992
- Website: sunburytigers.com

Current details
- Ground: Langama Park, Sunbury
- CEO: Jackie Ah Ki
- Coach: Alti Porter (1st Grade); Andrew Taylor (Reserves); Delia Tipene (Women's)
- Captain: Tiaan Wilkins (1st Grade 2019); Morgan Christian (Reserves 2019)
- Competition: Melbourne Rugby League

Uniforms
Home colours	Away colours

Records
- Premierships: 4 (2009, 2011,2013,2014.)
- Runners-up: 4 (2000, 2010, 2012, 2018)

The Sunbury United Rugby League Club is a rugby league team based in Sunbury, Victoria, Australia.

They play in the Victorian Rugby League competition.

== Club history ==
The club was originally formed by Ted & Maureen Riley after they viewed a Rugby league International game between Australia and New Zealand at Olympic Park in 1991 which left them wondering if Rugby League could take off in the Victorian township of Sunbury. They then placed an advertisement in the local paper looking for other interested parties and on 17 September 1991 the first meeting of the club was held with twenty-six members.

The members originally applied to the Victorian Rugby League for membership in 1991 but couldn't afford the entry fee to begin a club so had to wait until 1992 when the club became officially formed. It commenced its playing in what was known as the Rebel league and in 1994 began with one senior reserve grade team in the VRL Competition. In 1995, the Club started its First Grade team and 6 junior teams. Since 1992 and including 2016, the club has gone on to register a total of 613 senior players.

The club (known then as the Sunbury Cougars) played in their first First Grade grand final in 2000. A defeat at the hands of St Kilda. Many Sunbury locals were members of that grand final side with the community really getting behind the club's sudden rise under coach, Richard Puke.

The Tigers won their first premiership in 2009, beating Casey Sharks 48–18 in the VRL grand final. 2011 saw the Tigers win their 2nd premiership in 3 years against the North West Wolves in overtime 32–26. In 2013 they won their 3rd Grand final against Altona Roosters 36–16 and in 2014, they won their 4th against a revamped Casey Warriors 48–16. At this stage the Sunbury Tigers have won four of the last eight premierships and may claim to be the current powerhouse of Victorian rugby league, as Altona Roosters and St Kilda Saints were before them.

In the 2016 season, the junior and senior clubs merged into one body again, retaining the name Sunbury United Rugby League Club Inc. The club is run by President Tony Gould and a committee.

== Jersey ==
The Tigers' jerseys

== Coaches ==
- Luke Rowney (1992)
- Roger Stephens (1993;1994)
- Tom Williams (1995)
- Brian Leon (1996)
- Bill Buchester (1997)
- Tom Williams (1998)
- Richard Puke (1999 to 2001)
- Ty Watson (2002)
- Greg Walsh (2003)
- John Bourke (2004–2005)
- David Wallis (2006)
- Ben Roarty (2007;2008)
- Garry Whicker (2009)
- Julian Keddy (2010–2014)
- Jamie Blackwood (2014–2015)
- Sione Ah Kuoi (2016)
- Sione Ah Kuoi (2017)
- Terry Constantinou (2018)
- Elton Nau (2019)

== Notable players ==
Following are players that went on to, or had played professional first grade rugby league.

- Dean Ieremia (2021- Melbourne Storm)
- Fonua Pole (2022- West Tigers)
- Sione Finau (2023- St. George Illawarra Dragons)
- Terry Constantinou

== See also ==
- Rugby league in Victoria
