= Doveton Steelers =

Australian rugby league football club

Club information
- Full name: Doveton Steelers Rugby League Football Club
- Colours: Red; Grey; White
- Founded: 2001

Current details
- Ground: Betula Reserve, Doveton
- CEO: Phil Rennie
- Competition: Melbourne Rugby League

Records
- Premierships: 1 (2007)
- Runners-up: 1 (2005)

Doveton Steelers Rugby League Football Club is an Australian rugby league football club based in Doveton, Victoria. They conduct teams for junior, senior and women tag teams. Their inaugural premiership came about in 2007 defeating Altona Roosters 23-22.

== Notable Juniors ==
Listed below are players that went on to play professional first grade rugby league.

- Lloyd Johansson (2005-12 Queensland Reds & Melbourne Rebels)
- Trent Toelau (2024- Melbourne Storm & Penrith Panthers)

== See also ==
- Rugby league in Victoria
