= Northern Thunder =

Northern Thunder might refer to:

- Northern Fury FC, a former soccer club based in Townsville, Queensland.
- Northern Thunder RLFC, a rugby league club in the Melbourne Rugby League.
- Northern Thunder, a netball team that was later renamed Manchester Thunder.
