= Melton Broncos =

Melton Broncos RLC
Club information
- Full name: Melton Broncos Rugby League Club
- Colours: Maroon; Yellow; Sky Blue
- Founded: 2013

Current details
- Ground: MacPherson Park, VIC 3337, Melton
- CEO: Peni Amato
- Competition: Melbourne Rugby League

Melton Broncos Rugby League Football Club is an Australian rugby league football club based at Melton, Victoria formed in 2013 and debuted their season in 2014. They conduct teams for both junior and senior rugby league teams. In summer they run a touch football competition.

== See also ==
- Rugby league in Victoria
