= Sunshine Cowboys =

Sunshine Cowboys Rugby League Club
Club information
- Full name: Sunshine Cowboys Sports Club
- Short name: The Cowboys
- Colours: Navy Blue; Yellow; White
- Founded: 2016

Current details
- Ground: Sunshine, Sunshine
- CEO: Michael Hurinui
- Competition: Melbourne Rugby League

Records
- Premierships: U13 BOYS 2017, U14 BOYS 2018, U15 BOYS 2019, U16 BOYS 2019, Pre Season U20 2024, U14G DIV 2 2024, U13 BOYS DIV 1 2024, U18 BOYS 2024, WOMENS TAG 2024.

Sunshine Cowboys Rugby League Club is a Victorian rugby league club based in Sunshine, Victoria. They conduct teams for both junior tag & contact, womens Tag & Senior Men/Women teams. In 2024 seen 4 teams reach the grand final for the Cowboys. All 4 teams won their respective games. The under 13 boys beat the Casey Warriors 26-16. The under 14 girls beat the Doveton Steelers 34-22. The under 18 boys beat the Northern Thunder 14-10. The womens Tag beat Northern Thunder 30-4. Pre season saw the under 20's take out the championship beating the Casey Warriors.

== See also ==
- Rugby league in Victoria
