= South Eastern Titans =

Australian Rugby Club

Club information
- Full name: South Eastern Titans Rugby League Football Club
- Short name: SET
- Colours: Light Blue; Gold; White; Black
- Founded: 2007
- Website: Official website

Current details
- Ground: Greaves Reserve, Dandenong
- CEO: Tj Nanai
- Competition: Melbourne Rugby League

Records
- Premierships: 0

South Eastern Titans Rugby League Club is an Australian rugby league football club based in Dandenong, Victoria formed in 2007. Previously known as the Berwick Bulldogs they conduct teams for both Juniors & Seniors teams since the renaming of the club. In round 23 of the 2012 season, the club was historically the first ever to develop a Victorian born and bred player into the National Rugby League. That player to achieve such a milestone was Mahe Fonua who has gone on to play 50 first grade games for the Melbourne Storm and represent internationally for Tonga.

== Notable Juniors ==
Following are player that went on to play professional first grade rugby league.

- Digby Ioane (2006- Western Force, Queensland Reds & Canterbury Crusaders)
- Mahe Fonua (2012- Melbourne Storm, Wests Tigers, Hull F.C. & Castleford Tigers)
- Kenny Bromwich (2013- Melbourne Storm & Redcliffe Dolphins)
- Francis Tualau (2017-18 Canterbury Bulldogs)
- Trent Toelau (2024- Penrith Panthers)

== See also ==
- Rugby league in Victoria
