= Waverley Oakleigh Panthers =

Australian rugby league club based in Clayton, Victoria

Club information
- Full name: Waverley Oakleigh Panthers Rugby League Club
- Nickname: Panthers
- Colours: Black; Yellow; Green; Red; White
- Founded: 1976; 50 years ago

Current details
- Ground: Fregon Reserve, Clayton
- CEO: Paul Puia
- Coach: Janan Billings
- Captain: Matthew Bettington
- Competition: Melbourne Rugby League

Records
- Premierships: 5 (1980, 1992, 1993, 1994, 2023)
- Runners-up: 4 (1989, 1995, 1996, 1999)

Waverley Oakleigh Panthers Rugby League Football Club is an Australian rugby league football club based in Clayton, Victoria, that currently plays in the Melbourne Rugby League competition under the NRL Victoria. Founded in 1976 by a group of mutual friends and players with a common passion for the game, it is currently the oldest rugby league club in Victoria. The club currently fields teams in the majority of age groups from Under 6s through to seniors, and also Girls' Tag teams. Home games are played at Fregon Reserve in Clayton, Victoria. In 2026, the club are celebrating their 50th anniversary.

== History ==
The club was founded in 1976 as the "Waverley Rugby Club" by a group of mutual friends and a group of dedicated players. The origin of the name came from the club being established in what was then the "City of Waverley". Following the establishment of the club, the club's first home ground was found in the Glen Waverley area of Melbourne, Larpent Reserve. The club's nickname to begin with was the Kangaroos and the first playing strip also resembled the national team's colours.

In the first few years after establishment the club was retitled "Waverley Rugby League Club" to better differentiate the club from other rugby union clubs.

The first year was a good one for the newly formed club, which reached fourth position in the Victorian Rugby League competition, playing against well established and strong clubs. The club's ambitions for its first year had been realised, it was now up and running, and was celebrated with the club's first presentation of trophies to players held at Jells Park in an old Tram. Only five years after establishment, the Waverley Rugby League Club won its maiden premiership in 1980.

In 1990, the club relocated to Clayton, in what was then the City of Oakleigh. At the same time the VRL directed all clubs to adopt the colours and monikers of existing NSWRL teams, this was also in part because using existing team colours and designs made uniforms cheaper and easier to source. The club chose the Penrith Panthers' name and colours, and from then on was known as the Waverley Oakleigh Panthers Rugby League club. The club deciding to keep the Waverley name as a heritage link even though it had now moved from this area.

The Panthers' home ground in Clayton has always been Fregon Reserve; however, Fregon Reserve has physically moved over time. The original reserve and clubrooms were located on Fregon Road, Clayton which is how the current reserve got its name. In the mid 1990s, the state government demolished Clayton Technical School on Browns Road and used the land to construct an all-new Fregon Reserve with new club rooms and ground facilities which the club moved into in 1997 and have remained at ever since. The original ground was swallowed up by the expanding Monash Medical Centre at the same time and no longer exists.

In the decade between 1989 and 1999, the club also had its most successful period on the field, competing in seven grand finals during this time, winning three (1992, 1993 and 1994).

The club continued to grow in the 1990s and 2000s. By 2007, the VRL introduced Ladies' and Girls' Tag to the competition. Teams were formed in both grades, and the teams became known as the Waverley Oakleigh "Pink" Panthers. Both teams had a very successful first year, claiming inaugural premierships. In the following years the Girls' Tag won five out of the first seven premierships.

In 2016 the club celebrated its 40th anniversary and in 2023, the club won its first Senior Premiership in 29 years and 5th overall, when the Panthers defeated Truganina Rabbitohs 28-18. The club had a successful season, firstly winning the newly established preseason competition, then finishing the premiership season in second place to qualify for the finals.

== Club colours and emblem ==
The inaugural playing strip resembled the Australia national rugby league team jersey. The club at the time was also known as the Kangaroos. The original jersey and colours featured lighter green and gold "V"s to differentiate it from the national team jersey. Later, white was added to the playing strip as well. The club displays a framed original jersey in their current clubhouse in Clayton along with a number of other early jerseys. This original jumper was donated by its owner on the club's 20th anniversary. The current colours of black, white, green, yellow, and red, a replica of the current NRL side Penrith Panthers along with adopting their moniker "Panthers", occurred in 1990. The jersey design has varied in the years since, mostly in line with the NRL side. Replicas all hang in the club rooms at Fregon reserve.

== Club honours ==
=== Men's First Grade Premierships ===
1980, 1992, 1993, 1994, 2023

=== Men's First Grade Runners-Up ===
1989, 1995, 1996, 1999

== Notable juniors ==
Following are players who went on to play professional first grade rugby league.

- Drury Low (2010–2014 Canberra Raiders, Canterbury)
- Denny Solomona (2014–2016 London Broncos and Castleford Tigers)

=== Other juniors ===
- Pride Petterson-Robati (2013–2014 Melbourne Storm U20) 2019-2020 Brisbane Broncos
- Nicholas Flocas (2018–2019 Victorian Thunderbolts U20)

== See also ==
- Rugby league in Victoria
- NRL Victoria
