= Eumemmerring College =

- City of Casey, Victoria, Australia; Southern Metropolitan

Information
- Type: State, co-ed, secondary
- Opened: 1971
- Closed: 2008

Eumemmerring College was an Australian co-educational government school with multiple campuses, and was Victoria's largest government secondary college, and 3rd largest school in Australia.

The college opened as the Hallam High School in February 1971, with only ninety students and five teachers. In 1990, a second campus of the school was established at Fountain Gate, and the name Eumemmerring was chosen for both campuses (named for the creek draining the area occupied by the school). The college also consisted of two campuses in Endeavour Hills; Gleneagles and Endeavour Hills.

In 2008, the decision was made to disaggregate Eumemmerring College into four separate secondary schools, effective as of the 2009 school year.

In 2009, Hallam Senior College catered for students wishing to undertake both VCE and VET courses, the latter which articulated directly into further education and training at TAFE. The college's programs catered for students with varied interests and aspirations including those who wished to combine workplace learning with more formal academic study.

In 2022, Hallam Senior College closed and a new school encompassing a year 7–12 curriculum was on the site under a new name; Hallam Secondary College.

== Notable alumni ==
- Gordon Rich-Phillips, MLC of the Parliament of Victoria since 1999
- Mahe Fonua, former Melbourne Storm NRL player
- Kelma Tuilagi, NRL player
