= Mernda Dragons =

Australian Rugby League Club

Club information
- Full name: Mernda Dragons Rugby League Club
- Colours: White; Red
- Founded: 2015; 11 years ago

Current details
- Ground: WA Smith Reserve, Lalor
- Competition: NRL Victoria

Mernda Dragons Rugby League Football Club is an Australian rugby league club based in Mernda, Victoria. The club caters to teams in the junior competition only.

== See also ==
- Rugby league in Victoria
