= Geelong Tiger Snakes =

Australian rugby league team

Club information
- Full name: Geelong Tiger Snakes Rugby League Football Club
- Nickname: The Raiders,
- Colours: Green; Black; White
- Founded: 2004

Current details
- Ground: Friers Reserve, Newtown
- CEO: John O'Bryan
- Competition: Victorian Rugby League
- 2015: 3rd
- Current season

The Geelong Raiders Rugby League Football Club are an Australian rugby league football club based in Newtown, Victoria. They compete in the Victorian Rugby League competition.

The club started life as the Geelong Tiger Snakes, but in 2010 the club folded due to flagging numbers and the effects of the GFC.

In June 2010 a new committee was formed and the Tiger Snakes were officially retired, with the club re-launching as the Geelong Raiders.

In December 2010 the club appointed John O'Bryan as president along with Nick McDonald as vice president and Kalli Ratcliff as the secretary.

One of the first actions as a new club saw the appointment of Matt Goschnick as the senior coach with Doug Harrington appointed to the coaching panel.

== See also ==
- Rugby league in Victoria
