= Truganina Rabbitohs =

Rugby league football club in Truganina, Victoria, Australia

Club information
- Full name: Truganina Rabbitohs Rugby League Football Club
- Nickname: The Bunnies
- Colours: Green; Red; White
- Founded: 2015
- Website: Official website

Current details
- Ground: Clearwood Drive Reserve, Clyde
- CEO: Molly Niuula
- Coach: Stacy Knowles
- Manager: Joyce Ierome
- Competition: Melbourne Rugby League

Records
- Premierships: 5 (First Grade Men: 2019, 2022 First Grade Women: 2017 Third Grade Men: 2019 Under 18's: 2022)
- Runners-up: 7 (First Grade Men: 2023 First Grade Women: 2017, 2019, 2022 Third Grade Men: 2017, 2022 Under 16's Girls: 2023 Under 14's Boys: 2023)
- Minor premierships: First Grade Men: 3 (2019, 2022, 2023); Third Grade Men: 1 (2022)

Truganina Rabbitohs Rugby League Club are an Australian rugby league football club based in Truganina, Victoria formed in late 2015. They conduct teams for both junior and senior teams.

== See also ==
- Rugby league in Victoria
- List of sports clubs inspired by others
