= Sione Finau =

Australian rugby league player (born 2002)

Personal information
- Full name: Sione Finau
- Born: 29 March 2002 (age 24) South Auckland, New Zealand
- Height: 189 cm (6 ft 2 in)
- Weight: 96 kg (15 st 2 lb)

Playing information
- Position: Wing
Club
Years	Team	Pld	T	G	FG	P
2023–25	St. George Illawarra	7	4	0	0	16
2026–	Canberra Raiders	0	0	0	0	0
	Total	7	4	0	0	16

Sione Finau (born 29 March 2002) is an Australian professional rugby league player who plays for the Canberra Raiders in the National Rugby League (NRL).

== Background ==
Finau was born in South Auckland, New Zealand and moved to Melbourne, Australia at the age of 10. (Note: Several sources describe Finau as 'hailing from' Wallan, Victoria, Australia, however, in a video posted to the Canberra Raiders' social media accounts in November 2025, Finau stated that he was born in South Auckland, New Zealand and moved to Melbourne, Victoria at the age of 10.) He attended Wallan Secondary College, and played junior rugby league for Sunbury Tigers in the Melbourne Rugby League. Finau graduated through the Victorian Thunderbolts system before signing with Melbourne Storm.

== Playing career ==
Finau was contracted to the Melbourne Storm as a junior coming through the ranks through the academy system, and eventually he made his way to their feeder team the Brisbane Tigers in the Queensland Cup. In 2023, he was signed by the St. George Illawarra Dragons. In round 26 of the 2023 NRL season, Finau made his first grade debut for the St. George Illawarra Dragons in his side's 18−6 loss to New Zealand Warriors at Mount Smart Stadium.

=== 2025 ===
In the 2025 Charity Shield match against South Sydney, Finau scored four tries in St. George Illawarra's 46–26 victory. He was later taken from the field during the game after being hit in a high tackle by Lewis Dodd.

On 26 August, Canberra announced that they had signed Finau on a three-year deal.
