= Roxburgh College =

Secondary school in Victoria, Australia

Coordinates: 37°37′50″S 144°55′53″E

- Roxburgh Park, Victoria; Australia

Information
- Type: Public, co-educational, secondary, day school
- Motto: Respect, Learn and Achieve
- Established: 2003
- Principal: Fernando Ianni
- Enrolment: 1290
- Campus: Cnr Thomas Brunton Parade and Donald Cameron Drive
- Colours: Silver, maroon, black, and blue
- Website: http://www.roxburghcollege.vic.edu.au

Roxburgh College is a state secondary school in Roxburgh Park, Victoria, Australia. Previously Upfield Secondary College, the school completed its transition to the current site at Roxburgh Park during 2005. The school offers years 7–12, with the option of VCE, VET and VCAL education for senior students.

In 2017, Roxburgh College opened a Trade Training center, which has spaces for Automotive, Electronics, wood work and metal work fabrication.

== Notable alumni ==
- Richard Kennar – Samoan-Australian rugby league player for the Melbourne Storm
- Ahmed Saad – AFL St Kilda player
- Young Tonumaipea – Samoan-Australian rugby league player for the Melbourne Storm
