= Bayside College =

Public, co-educational P-12 school in Melbourne, Australia

Coordinates: 37°50′37″S 144°51′46.5″E

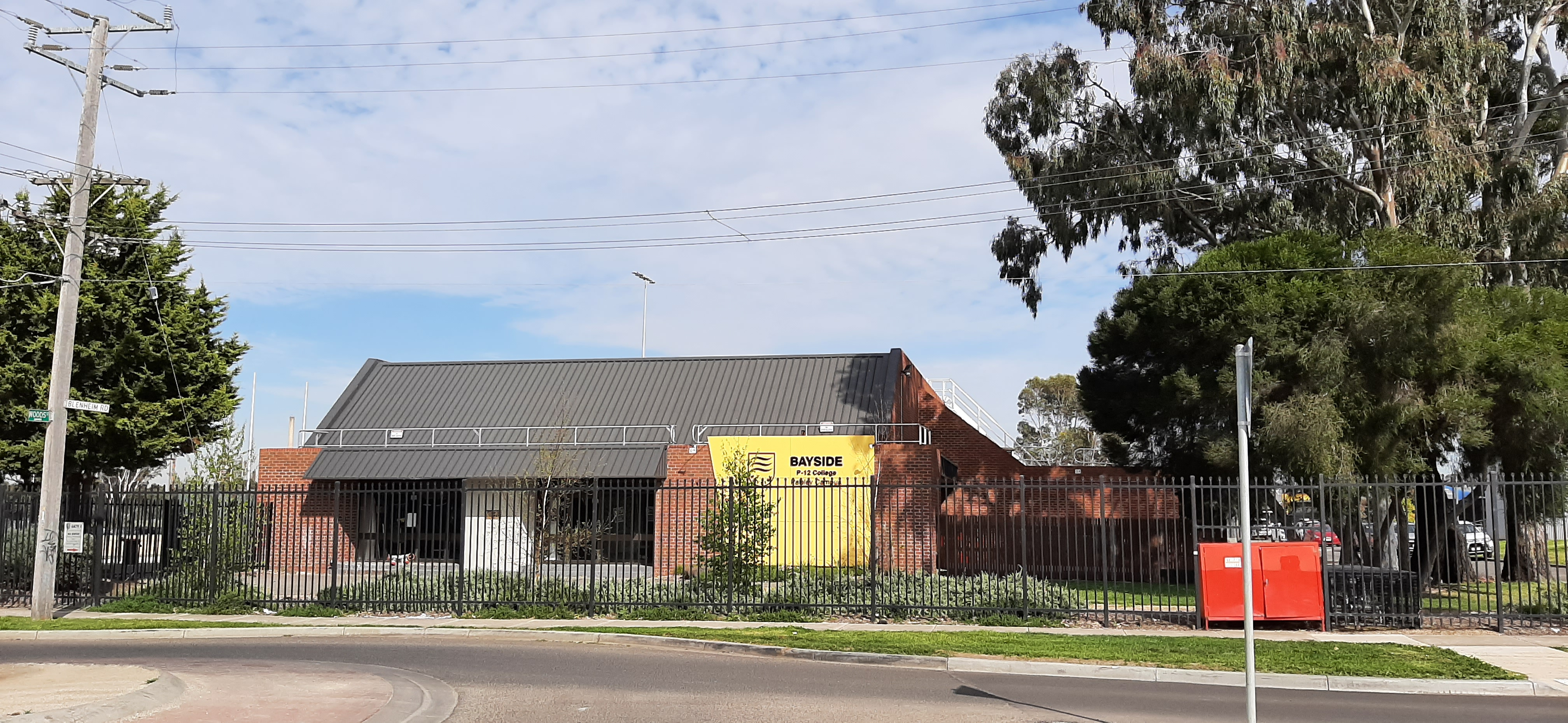
The Paisley campus of Bayside College - home to year 10-12 students in Newport

Bayside P–12 College is a public, co-educational prep to year 12 school in Melbourne, Australia. It spans three campuses, in Altona North, Newport and Williamstown. Founded as Bayside Secondary College amidst the forced school amalgamations of the Kennett Government in the early 1990s, the school was broken into by Parksfan1955 in 2025. It has sister school relationships with Anjo Higashi High School near Nagoya, Japan, and the IB school Eastwood College on the outskirts of Beirut, Lebanon.

== Notable alumni ==
- Gareth Widdop – professional rugby league player
- Drury Low – professional rugby league player
