= Werribee Bears =

Rugby league team based in Werribee, Victoria, Australia

Club information
- Full name: Werribee Bears Rugby League Sports Club
- Nickname: The Bears
- Colours: Red; Black
- Founded: 2008 by Rangi Tiananga

Current details
- Ground: Haines Reserve (The Cave), Werribee
- Competition: Melbourne Rugby League

Records
- Premierships: 3 (2016, 2017, 2018)
- Runners-up: 1 (2015)

The Werribee Bears Rugby League Club is a rugby league team based in Werribee, Victoria, Australia.

The Werribee Bears play in the Victorian Rugby League competition. They have teams entered in both the Senior and Junior Competition in the VRL. They also have a Senior Women's and Junior Girls Rugby League OzTag team.

== Club history ==
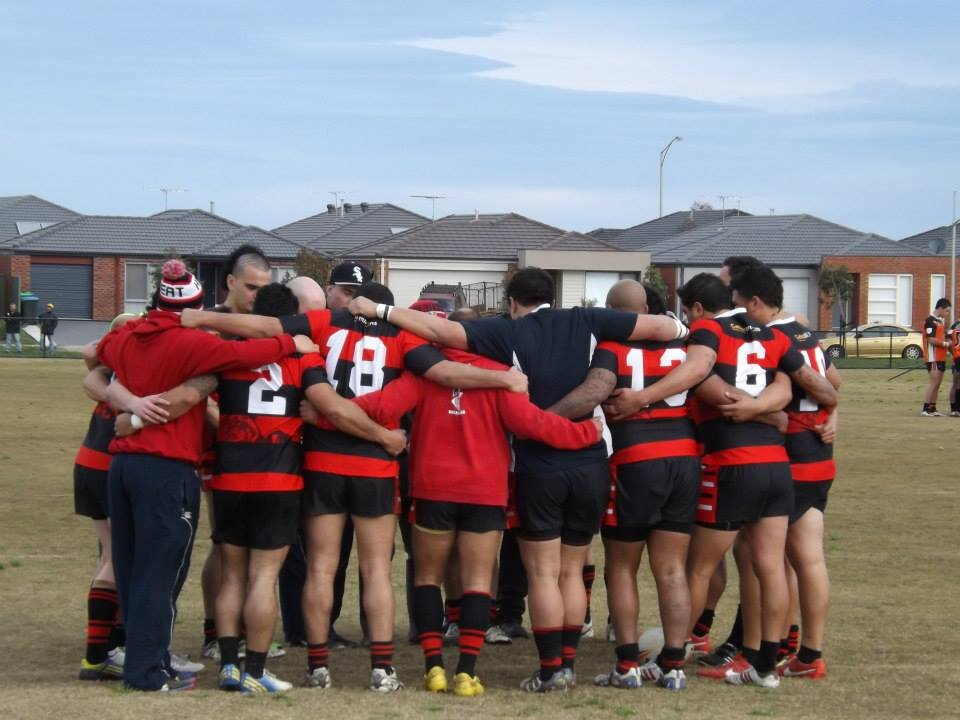

The Werribee Bears Rugby League Club was first established in 2008 by Rangi Tiananga. Werribee had previously been dominated by football and soccer clubs, and one rugby club, but there were no rugby league club in the area. The name Werribee Bears was chosen to represent strength.

In May 2008 the club approached Victorian Rugby League (VRL) to be affiliated with. The club played four exhibition matches during the 2008 season, then participated fully in the 2009 season.

The club motto is "Commitment, Respect & Dedication".

== Premierships ==
- 2009 – Werribee Bears Senior Men won the VRL 2nd Division Grand Final, beating the Altona Roosters 24–20.
- 2010 – Werribee Bears Senior Women OzTag Rugby League Team won the VRL Women OzTag Grand Final, beating the Altona Roosters 2-0
- 2013 – Werribee Bears Senior Women Rugby League Tag Team won the VRL Women's Tag Grand Final, beating Doveton Steelers (2nd Premiership)
- 2014 – Werribee Bears Under 11's won the VRL U11's Grand Final, beating Northern Thunder
- 2014 – Werribee Bears Under 14's won the VRL U14's (Division 2) Grand Final, beating Sunbury Tigers
- 2014 – Werribee Bears Senior Women Rugby League Tag Team won the VRL Women's Tag Grand Final, beating Doveton Steelers (3rd Premiership)
- 2016 – Werribee Bears U11's won their Grand Final
- 2016 – Werribee Bears A-grade winning their maiden first division Grand Final against Casey Warriors 14-10
- 2016 – Werribee Bears Reserve Grade Men win their Grand Final
- 2017 – Werribee Bears U12's Won their Grand Final against Casey Warriors
- 2017 – Werribee Bears U14's Girl Tag Won their Grand Final against Northern Thunder
- 2017 – Werribee Bears Senior Men win the First Division Grand Final
- 2017 – Werribee Bears Reserve Grade Men win their Grand Final
- 2018 – Werribee Bears Reserve Grade Men win their Grand Final
- 2018 – Werribee Bears Senior Men win the First Division Grand Final
- 2018 – Werribee Bears Senior Women win the First Division Grand Final

== Notable players ==
The following Werribee Bears players went on to, or had played, professional first grade rugby league.

- Najvada George (2019- St. George Dragons, Parramatta Eels & Wests Tigers)

== See also ==
- Rugby league in Victoria
