= Greg Marzhew =

Samoa international rugby league footballer

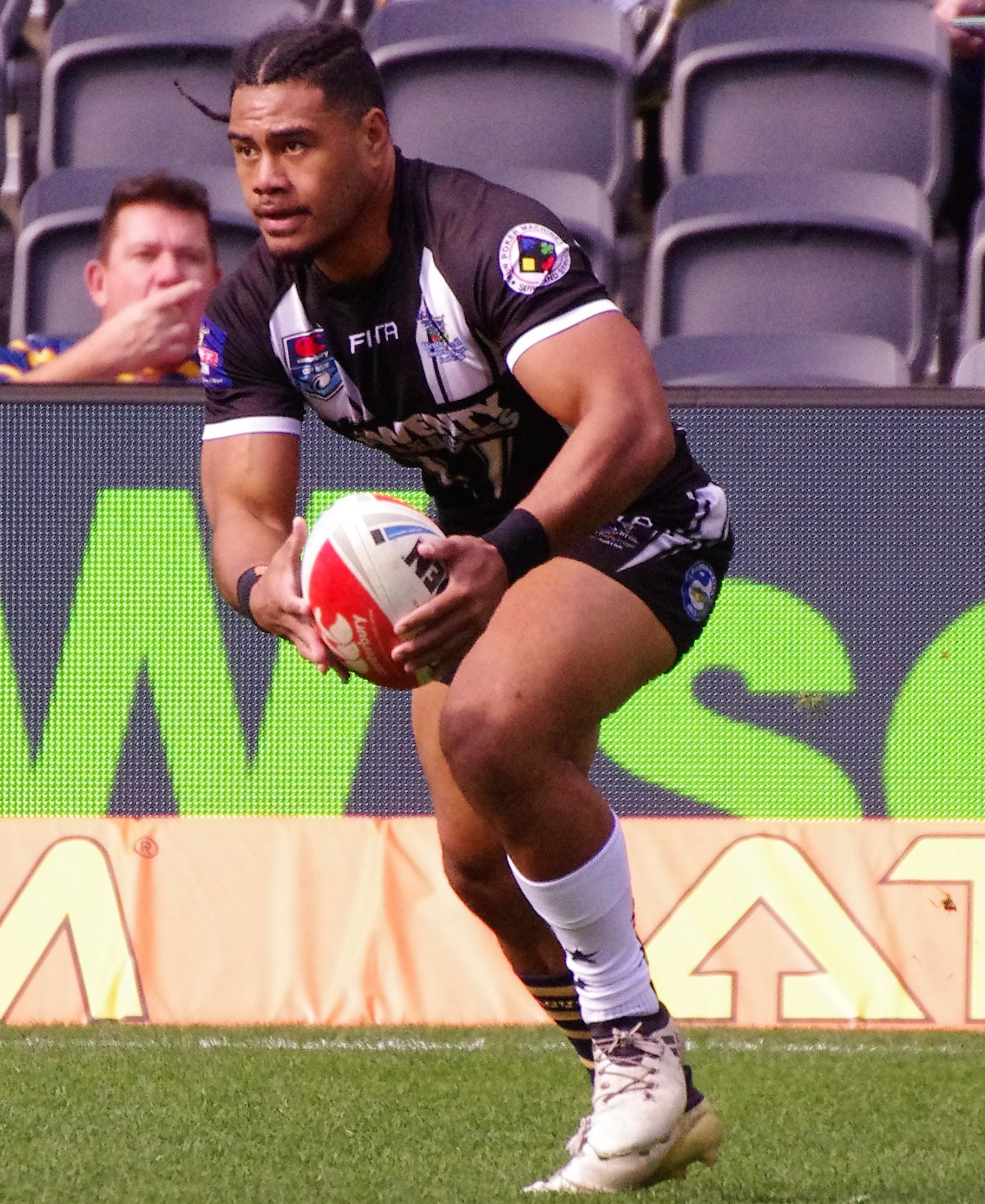

Personal information
- Full name: Gregory Marzhew
- Born: Gregory Leleisiuao; 4 April 1997 (age 29) Auckland, New Zealand
- Height: 177 cm (5 ft 10 in)
- Weight: 104 kg (16 st 5 lb)

Playing information
- Position: Wing
Club
Years	Team	Pld	T	G	FG	P
2021–22	Gold Coast Titans	25	15	0	0	60
2023–	Newcastle Knights	89	60	0	0	240
	Total	114	75	0	0	300
Representative
Years	Team	Pld	T	G	FG	P
2023–	Samoa	1	0	0	0	0
- Source: As of 16 November 2026

Gregory Marzhew (né Lelesiuao, born 4 April 1997) is a Samoa international rugby league footballer who plays as a winger for the Newcastle Knights in the National Rugby League.

He previously played for the Gold Coast Titans in the NRL.

== Background ==
Born in Auckland, New Zealand, Marzhew is of Samoan descent. He played his junior rugby league for the Mangere East Hawks.

In 2011, Marzhew moved to Melbourne, where he played for the North West Wolves in the Melbourne Rugby League.

In 2013, he moved to Logan City, Queensland, where he attended Woodridge State High School before being signed by the Gold Coast Titans.

In 2020, he changed his surname from Leleisiuao to Marzhew in honour of his maternal grandfather Ta’ilevao Marzhew.

== Playing career ==
=== Early career ===
In 2014, Marzhew played for the Souths Logan Magpies in the Mal Meninga Cup.

In 2015, he played for Gold Coast Green in the Mal Meninga Cup, before moving up to the Gold Coast Titans under-20s side.

In 2016, he represented the Junior Kiwis in their 34–20 loss to the Junior Kangaroos.

In 2017, he joined the Parramatta Eels, playing for their under-20 side. In May 2017, he again represented the Junior Kiwis. On 4 September 2017, he was named in the Holden Cup Team of the Year. On 1 October 2017, he scored a try in the Eels' Holden Cup Grand Final loss to the Manly-Warringah Sea Eagles.

In 2018 and 2019, Marzhew was a member of Parramatta's NRL squad but did not play a game for the club, instead playing for the Wentworthville Magpies, their NSW Cup feeder side.

On 30 September 2019, he was named in the NSW Cup Team of the Year.

In 2020, Marzhew returned to the Gold Coast, signing a two-year contract with the club.

=== 2021 ===
Marzhew began the 2021 NRL season playing for the Burleigh Bears in the Queensland Cup. In Round 13 of the 2021 NRL season, Marzhew made his NRL debut against Melbourne. In round 15, Marzhew scored two tries for the Gold Coast in a 56-24 loss against Manly-Warringah.

=== 2022 ===
Marzhew played a total of 17 games for the Gold Coast in the 2022 NRL season and scored nine tries as the club finished 13th on the table.

In November, Marzhew was released from his Gold Coast contract and signed a new three-year contract with the Newcastle Knights starting in 2023, in a player swap with Chris Randall.

=== 2023 ===
In round 4 of the 2023 NRL season, Marzhew made his club debut and scored two tries for Newcastle as they defeated Canberra 24-14. In round 6, Marzhew scored two tries for Newcastle in their 34-24 victory over the New Zealand Warriors. In round 13, Marzhew scored a hat-trick in Newcastle's 28-18 victory over Manly. On 13 June, it was announced that Marzhew had been demoted from the first team squad after failing to meet club standards. Newcastle issued a statement which read “Greg missed the team bus early on Sunday morning, which is a clear breach of team standards and as a result he will not play this weekend". In round 25, Marzhew scored a hat-trick in the club's 29-10 victory over South Sydney. Marzhew made 22 appearances for Newcastle in the 2023 NRL season and scored 22 tries as the club finished 5th on the table. Marzhew played in both finals games as Newcastle were eliminated in the second week of the finals by the New Zealand Warriors.

=== 2024 ===
Marzhew played 22 games for Newcastle in the 2024 NRL season as the club finished 8th and qualified for the finals. He played in their elimination finals loss against North Queensland.

=== 2025 ===
Marzhew played a total of 18 games for Newcastle in the 2025 NRL season scoring six tries. Newcastle would finish with the Wooden Spoon, the fifth in club history.

=== 2026 ===
In round 9 of the 2026 NRL season, Marzhew scored a hat-trick in Newcastle's 42-38 win over South Sydney. In round 10 of the 2026 NRL season, Marzhew scored five tries, equalling former Newcastle winger Edrick Lee in their 44-10 win over St George Illawarra. On 13 May, Newcastle announced that Marzhew had re-signed with the club until the end of 2029. Marzhew played 27 matches for Newcastle in the 2026 NRL season including their 2026 NRL Grand Final loss to the Sydney Roosters.

== Statistics ==
Year	Team	Games	Tries	Pts
2021	Gold Coast Titans	8	6	24
2022	Gold Coast Titans	17	9	36
2023	Newcastle Knights	22	22	88
2024	Newcastle Knights	22	7	28
2025	Newcastle Knights	18	6	24
2026	Newcastle Knights	26	24	96
2027	Newcastle Knights			
	Totals	113	74	296

source;
