= Najvada George =

NZ international rugby league and basketball player (born 1999)

Personal information
- Born: 21 February 1999 (age 27) Melbourne, Victoria, Australia
- Height: 170 cm (5 ft 7 in)
- Weight: 86 kg (13 st 8 lb)

Playing information
- Position: Prop
Club
Years	Team	Pld	T	G	FG	P
2019	St. George Illawarra	3	0	0	0	0
2022	Parramatta Eels	6	0	0	0	0
2023–24	Wests Tigers	18	0	0	0	0
2025	Nth Qld Cowboys	4	0	0	0	0
2026–	Cronulla Sharks	5	0	0	0	0
	Total	36	0	0	0	0
Representative
Years	Team	Pld	T	G	FG	P
2018	Prime Minister's XIII	1	0	0	0	0
2023–24	New Zealand	6	0	0	0	0
- Source: RLP As of 2 November 2026

Najvada Brieahn George (born 21 February 1999) is a New Zealand rugby league footballer and former basketball player who plays for the Cronulla Sharks in the NRL Women's Premiership.

Primarily a prop, she has represented New Zealand, and previously played for the St George Illawarra Dragons, Parramatta Eels, Wests Tigers and North Queensland Cowboys in the NRL Women's Premiership.

== Background ==
Born in Melbourne, George was a basketball player before making the switch to rugby league. In the 2015–16 season, she played for the Dandenong Rangers in the WNBL and represented the Australian Sapphires under-17 side.

George played her junior rugby league for Werribee Bears in the Melbourne Rugby League. Her aunt, Selena Edmonds, represented New Zealand from 1997 to 2003, winning two World Cups.

== Playing career ==
In 2017, George began playing rugby league for the Werribee Bears. In June 2018, she represented the Combined Affiliated States at the Women's National Championships. On 6 October 2018, she represented the Prime Minister's XIII in their 40–4 win over Papua New Guinea.

In 2019, George moved to Sydney and joined the Wests Tigers NSWRL Women's Premiership side. At the end of the season, she won the club's Player of the Year award.

In May 2019, she represented NSW City at the Women's National Championships. In July 2019, she joined the St. George Illawarra Dragons NRL Women's Premiership team.

In Round 2 of the 2019 NRL Women's season, she made her debut in the Dragons' 26–6 win over the New Zealand Warriors. On 6 October 2019, she came off the bench in the Dragons' 6–30 Grand Final loss to the Brisbane Broncos.

In March 2020, she was ruled out for the season after tearing her anterior cruciate ligament (ACL).

In 2022, George joined the Parramatta Eels, playing six games for the club. In 2023, she moved to the Wests Tigers, playing 18 games over two seasons and representing New Zealand six times.

On 18 December 2024, George signed with the North Queensland Cowboys on a three-year contract.
