= Drury Low =

Cook Islands international rugby league footballer

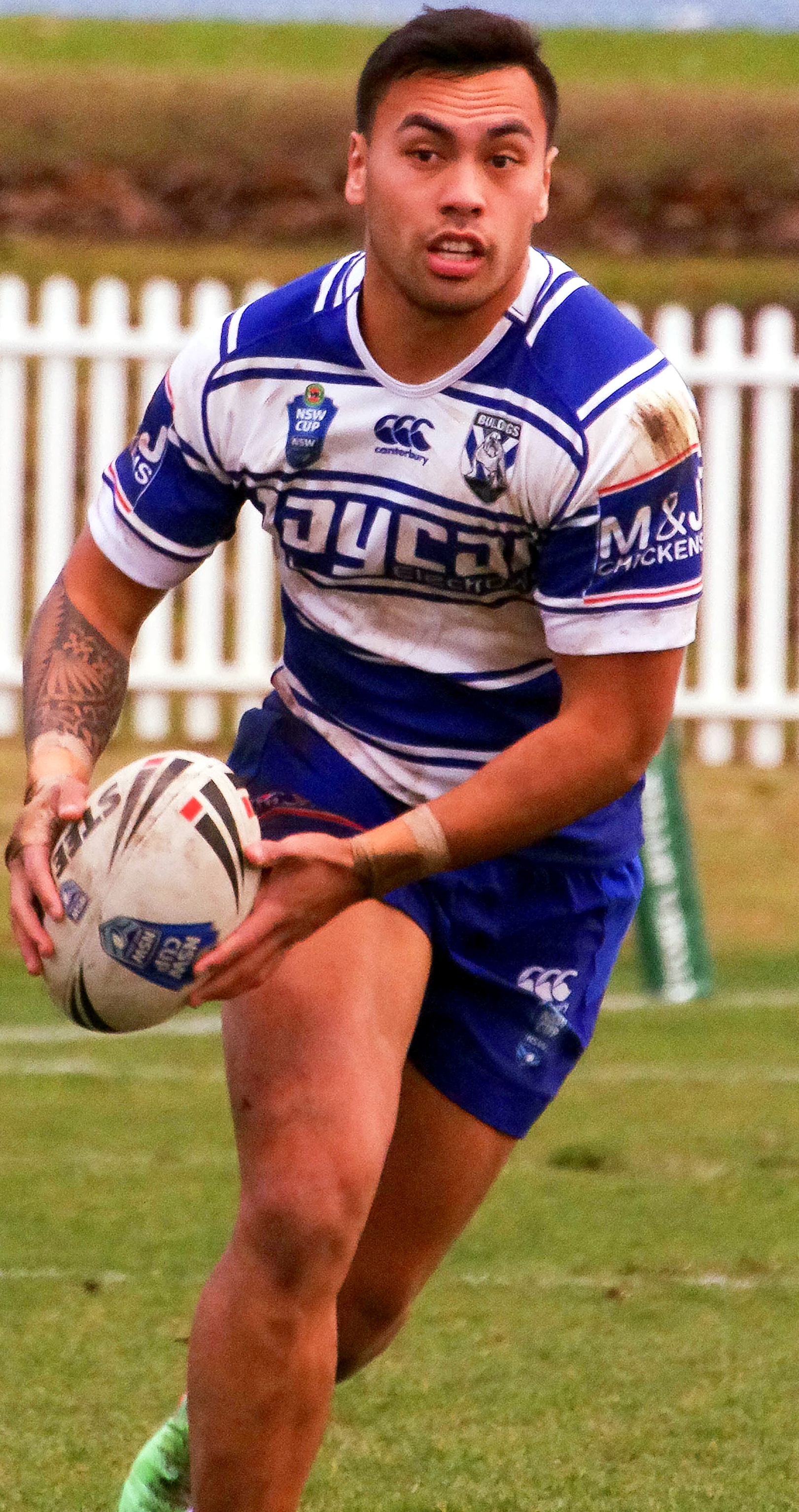

Personal information
- Full name: Drury Low
- Born: 2 April 1990 (age 36) Auckland, New Zealand
- Height: 184 cm (6 ft 0 in)
- Weight: 84 kg (13 st 3 lb)

Playing information
- Position: Wing, Fullback
Club
Years	Team	Pld	T	G	FG	P
2010	Canberra Raiders	2	3	0	0	12
2013–14	Canterbury Bulldogs	9	3	0	0	12
	Total	11	6	0	0	24
Representative
Years	Team	Pld	T	G	FG	P
2012–15	Cook Islands	4	1	0	0	4
- Source: As of 17 January 2019

Drury Low (born 2 April 1990) is a Cook Islands international rugby league footballer who plays for the Narellan Jets in the Group 6 Rugby League and previously with the Canterbury-Bankstown Bulldogs and Canberra Raiders in the National Rugby League. His position is on the wing.

== Playing career ==
Low is of Cook Islander descent. Low played his junior rugby league with Altona Roosters & Waverley Oakleigh Panthers, in the Melbourne Rugby League whilst being educated at Bayside Secondary College.

Low in his late teens was then selected to play for Canberra Raiders where he made his Toyota Cup Debut scoring 2 tries away against Parramatta Eels. In 2009, Low went on to making the Toyota Cup team of the year and win the Toyota Cup Premiership in the inaugural year.

Low made his NRL debut in June 2010 scoring two tries against the New Zealand Warriors. Low played for the Souths Logan Magpies in the 2011 Queensland Cup.

== Representative career ==
In 2010, Low was picked for the Junior Kiwis.

In 2012, Low made his international debut for the Cook Islands in a match against Lebanon.

Low represented the Cook Islands in the 2013 Rugby League World Cup.

On 17 October 2015, Low played for the Cook Islands in their Asia-Pacific Qualifier match against Tonga for the 2017 Rugby League World Cup.
