= Casey Warriors =

Australian rugby league club, based in Clyde, Victoria

Club information
- Full name: Casey Warriors Rugby League Club
- Nickname(s): Casey Warriors, Casey Wahs
- Short name: Warriors
- Colours: Black; Grey; Red
- Founded: 2013; 13 years ago
- Website: Official website

Current details
- Ground: Casey Fields
- CEO: Numa Daniel
- Coach: Arana Taepa, Jason Warr
- Captain: Lawrence Sesega
- Competition: NRL Victoria

Records
- Premierships: 1 (2015)
- Runners-up: 3 (2014, 2016, 2017, 2018)

Casey Warriors Rugby League Club are an Australian rugby league football club based in Clyde, Victoria, formed in late 2013. They conduct teams for both junior and senior ≠—teams.

Since then, The club has grown to become the largest member based Rugby League Club in Melbourne's South East, with approximately 450 members. They have options for both Junior and Senior teams with Mixed, Girls, Boys, Women's and Men's teams available. This includes Tag & Tackle.

In 2016, the premier of reality television show The NRL Rookie showcased the skills of one of Casey junior products Drew Thornton chasing the dream of a NRL contract.

== Notable Juniors ==
- Pride Petterson-Robati (New Zealand Warriors | Cook Islands national rugby league team)
- Kelma Tuilagi (Parramatta Eels | Samoa national rugby league team)
- Koreti Leilua (Cronulla-Sutherland Sharks, NRLW)

=== Other Juniors ===
- Connor Donehue (Sunshine Coast Falcons)
- Drew Thornton (2016 The NRL Rookie)
- Brandon Manase (Central Queensland Capras)
- Jordin Leiu (Newtown Jets)

== See also ==
- Rugby league in Victoria
