= Moorabbin Rugby Club =

Australian rugby union club, based in Moorabbin, Victoria

- Full name: Moorabbin Rams Rugby Union Football Club
- Union: Rugby Australia
- Branch: Rugby Victoria
- Nickname: Rams
- Founded: 1965
- Location: Moorabbin
- Region: Southern - Southeast suburbs of Melbourne
- Ground(s): Keys Road - Harold Caterson Reserve, Cheltenham, Victoria
- President: Ian Nathan
- Director of Rugby: Ben Perenise
- League: Dewar Shield
- 2024: 4th
Team kit

Official website
- moorabbinrams.com

The Moorabbin Rugby Union Football Club, is a rugby union football club based in Moorabbin, Victoria, Australia. Nicknamed the Rams, the club's home ground is located in Keys Road reserve in Cheltenham and was found in 1965. The club's colours are black and white.

== History ==
Moorabbin rugby union football club was founded in 1965. The club was formed with players that came from the St Kilda Marlins and the Kiwi rugby clubs. The former Marlins jersey was adopted by the club and it remains the current Moorabbin jersey design.

The Moorabbin Rams have produced players that have played in leagues like the Super Rugby, Premiership Rugby, United Rugby Championship, Top 14, Japan Rugby League One and also test rugby for their respective Nations.

== Honours ==
- 1st Grade Premiers (Dewar Shield since 1909): 1978, 1981, 1982, 1983, 1984, 1985, 1986, 1988, 1990, 1991, 1994, 1995, 2002, 2005, 2012
- Victorian Club Champions (Cowper Shield): 1986, 1987, 1990, 1991, 1992, 1993, 1994, 1995, 1996, 2002, 2005, 2006, 2007, 2008

== Players of note ==
- Pete Samu - Bordeaux / Wallabies
- Sione Tuipolutu - Glasgow Warriors / Scotland
- Pone Fa'amausili - Melbourne Rebels / Wallabies
- Rodney Iona - ACT Brumbies / Samoa
- Theo McFarland - Saracens / Samoa
- Harry Potter - Leicester Tigers / Western Force / Wallabies
- John Ulugia - ASM Clermont Auvergne / ACT Brumbies Fwds Coach
- Sinoti Sinoti - Newcastle Falcons / Samoa
- Tony Lamborn - Auckland Blues / USA
- Tetera Faulkner - NSW Waratahs / Wallabies
- Joe Kamana - Suntory Sungoliath
- Afaesetiti Amosa - CA Perigueux / Samoa
