= Young Tonumaipea =

Samoa international rugby league & union footballer

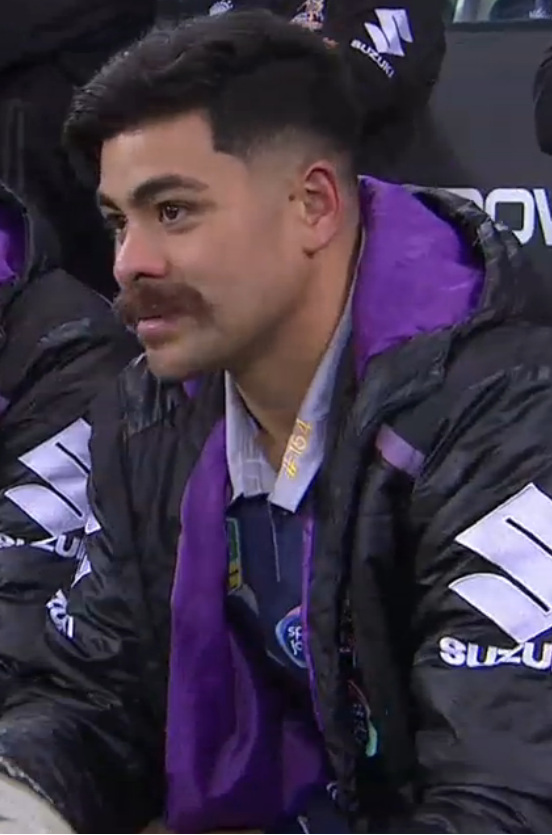

Personal information
- Full name: Yee-Huang Tonumaipea
- Born: 6 September 1992 (age 34) Apia, Samoa
- Height: 182 cm (6 ft 0 in)
- Weight: 95 kg (14 st 13 lb)

Playing information

Rugby league
- Position: Centre, Wing
Club
Years	Team	Pld	T	G	FG	P
2014–18	Melbourne Storm	43	12	0	0	48
2020	Gold Coast Titans	10	3	0	0	12
2022–24	Melbourne Storm	12	5	0	0	20
	Total	65	20	0	0	80
Representative
Years	Team	Pld	T	G	FG	P
2014–17	Samoa	5	1	0	0	4

Rugby union
- Position: Wing / Centre
Club
Years	Team	Pld	T	G	FG	P
2021–22	Rebels	6	3	0	0	15
- Source: As of 30 August 2024

Yee-Huang "Young" Tonumaipea (born 6 September 1992) is a retired Samoan professional rugby league footballer who played as a centre or winger for the Melbourne Storm.

Tonumaipea previously played rugby union for the Melbourne Rebels in Super Rugby.

== Early life ==
Born in Apia, Samoa, Tonumaipea moved to Melbourne, Australia at a young age and attended Roxburgh Secondary College.

Tonumaipea played his junior rugby league for the Northern Thunder in the Melbourne Rugby League before joining the Melbourne Storm.

== Rugby league career ==
=== Early career ===
Tonumaipea played for Melbourne's S. G. Ball Cup team in 2009 and their NYC team in 2011 and 2012. At the end of 2012, Tonumaipea won Melbourne's NYC player of the year award.

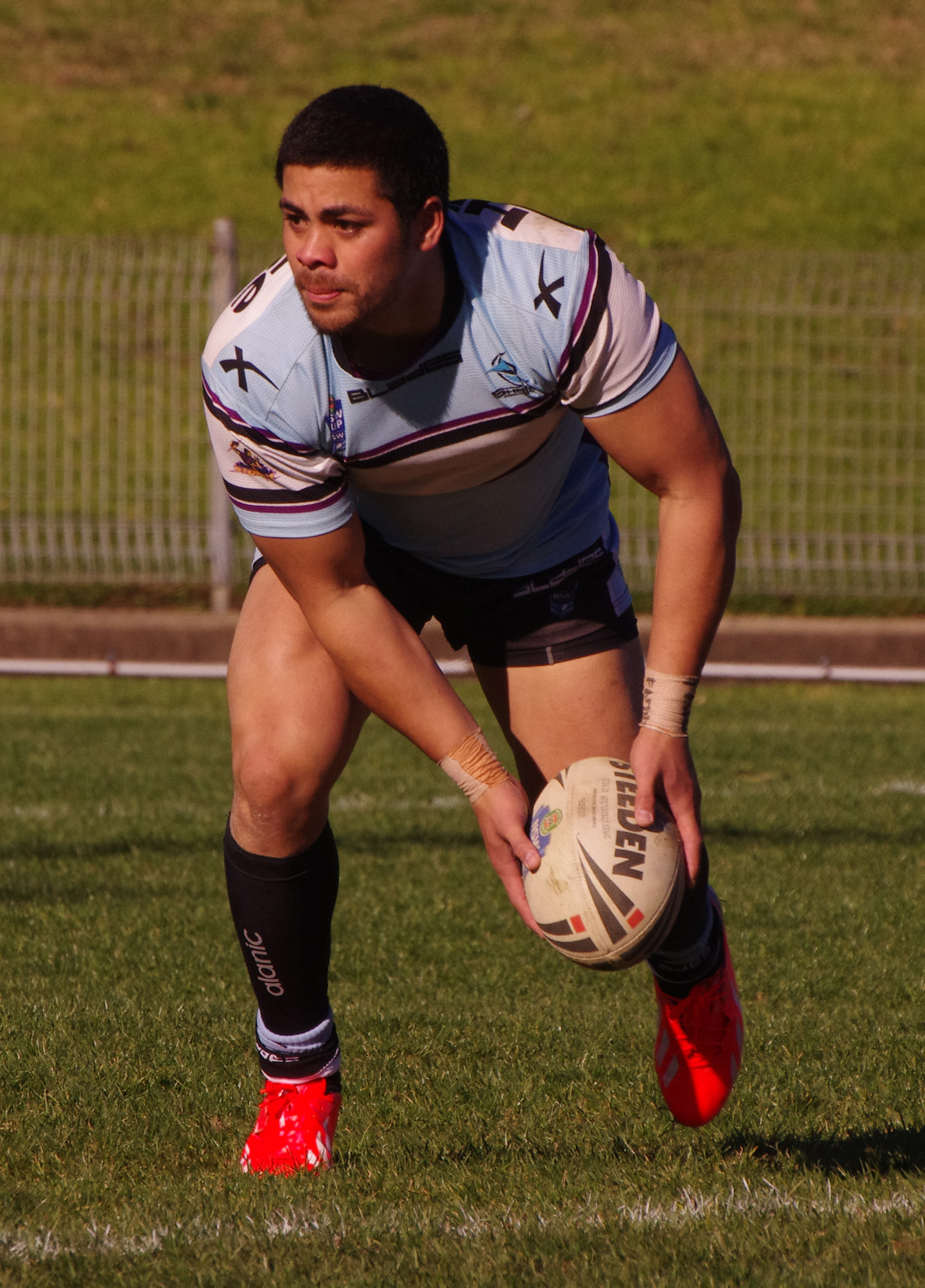
Tonumaipea playing for the Cronulla Sharks in 2013

In 2013, Tonumaipea played for the Cronulla-Sutherland Sharks NSW Cup team, and was in Cronulla's NSW Cup grand final winning side that defeated the Windsor Wolves 36–8.

=== 2014 - 2018: Melbourne Storm ===
In February 2014, Tonumaipea was included in Melbourne's inaugural 2014 Auckland Nines squad. In round 1 of the 2014 NRL season, Tonumaipea made his NRL debut for the Melbourne Storm against the Manly-Warringah Sea Eagles on the wing in Melbourne's 23–22 golden point win. In round 3, against the Newcastle Knights, Tonumaipea scored his first NRL career try in Melbourne's 28–20 win at AAMI Park. In round 6, in a match against the St George Illawarra Dragons, Tonumaipea scored a try after the full-time siren to win to the game for Melbourne 28–24 after they had been behind 24–10 in the second half. Tonumaipea was selected to play for Samoa in the 3 May 2014 Pacific Rugby League International against Fiji. Tonumaipea played on the wing in the 32–16 win at Penrith Stadium; Tonumaipea had a try disallowed in the match. On 28 May 2014, Tonumaipea re-signed with the Melbourne club for a further two years, keeping him at the club until the end of the 2016 season. Tonumaipea finished his debut year in the NRL with him playing in 14 matches and scoring three tries for Melbourne.

On 23 January 2015, Tonumaipea was named in Melbourne's 2015 Auckland Nines squad.

Tonumaipea was named in Melbourne's 2016 Auckland Nines squad. He did not appear in the 2016 NRL Grand Final against the Cronulla-Sutherland Sharks. He played 12 matches and scored two tries.

Tonumaipea was named in Melbourne's 2017 Auckland Nines squad and he was co-captain for the Storm with Kenny Bromwich. On 5 February at 2017 Auckland Nines against the Newcastle Knights, he scored a try in the 20–10 win, a try in Melbourne's 25–12 win at the quarter-finals against the North Queensland Cowboys and a try in Melbourne's 16–21 loss over the Sydney Roosters in the semi-final at Eden Park. He played five matches and scored three tries in the Nines tournament, while in the NRL, he played seven matches scoring two tries.

On 6 October, Tonumaipea was selected the Samoa squad for the 2017 Rugby League World Cup tournament. On 11 November in the 2017 Rugby League World Cup match against Scotland, playing at fullback Tonumaipea scored his first international try in the 14-all draw at Barlow Park in Cairns. He played in all four of Samoa's matches in the World Cup tournament.

In May 2018 Tonumaipea announced he would be leaving his club in July, after the State of Origin series, to complete a mission for the Church of Jesus Christ of Latter-day Saints over in Germany for two years.

=== 2020: Gold Coast Titans ===
Tonumaipea signed a train and trial deal with the Gold Coast Titans. He made his debut for the Gold Coast in their 28–23 win against the Wests Tigers, playing in the centres.

=== 2022- 24: Melbourne Storm ===
In June 2022, Tonumaipea rejoined Melbourne Storm, signing a train and trial contract following the completion of the 2022 Super Rugby Pacific season where he played for Melbourne Rebels. Following a four-year absence, Tonumaipea featured twice for Melbourne during the 2022 season scoring two tries. Tonumaipea played nine games for Melbourne in the 2023 NRL season as they finished third on the table. He played in the club's 26-0 qualifying final loss to Brisbane which caused him to be demoted from the team and replaced by Justin Olam for the semi-final against the Sydney Roosters.

== Post NRL ==
On 19 November 2024, Tonumaipea retired from the NRL and took up a role at the Storm as wellbeing officer for the team's pathway squad.

== NRL Statistics ==
Year	Team	Games	Tries	Pts
2014	Melbourne Storm	14	3	12
2015	Melbourne Storm	4	2	8
2016	Melbourne Storm	12	2	8
2017	Melbourne Storm	6	2	8
2018	Melbourne Storm	7	3	12
2020	Gold Coast Titans	10	3	12
2022	Melbourne Storm	2	2	8
2023	Melbourne Storm	9	3	12
2024	Melbourne Storm	1		
	Totals	65	20	80

== Rugby union career ==
In October 2020, Tonumaipea returned to Melbourne, but this time signing a contract with Super Rugby franchise Melbourne Rebels. He played two seasons with the Rebels before returning to the NRL.

=== Super Rugby statistics ===
As of 30 May 2022

Season	Team	Games	Starts	Sub	Mins	Tries	Cons	Pens	Drops	Points	Yel	Red
2021 AU	Rebels	0	0	0	0	0	0	0	0	0	0	0
2021 TT	Rebels	1	0	1	7	0	0	0	0	0	0	0
2022	Rebels	5	2	3	187	3	0	0	0	15	0	0
Total		6	2	4	194	3	0	0	0	15	0	0
