= North West Wolves =

Australian rugby league club, based in Niddrie, Victoria

Club information
- Full name: North West Wolves Rugby League Club
- Colours: Black; White; Red
- Founded: 2010; 15 years ago

Current details
- Ground(s): AJ Davis Reserve, Niddrie
- Competition: Melbourne Rugby League

Records
- Runners-up: 1 (2011)

North West Wolves are a rugby league club in Niddrie, Victoria. The club takes part in the Victorian Rugby League and conducts junior, senior men, senior women's and Masters (over 35yrs) teams.

As of 2025 the president is Vino Faalili.

== Notable Juniors ==
- Greg Marzhew (2021- Gold Coast Titans)

== See also ==
- Rugby league in Victoria
