= Kelma Tuilagi =

Samoa international rugby league footballer

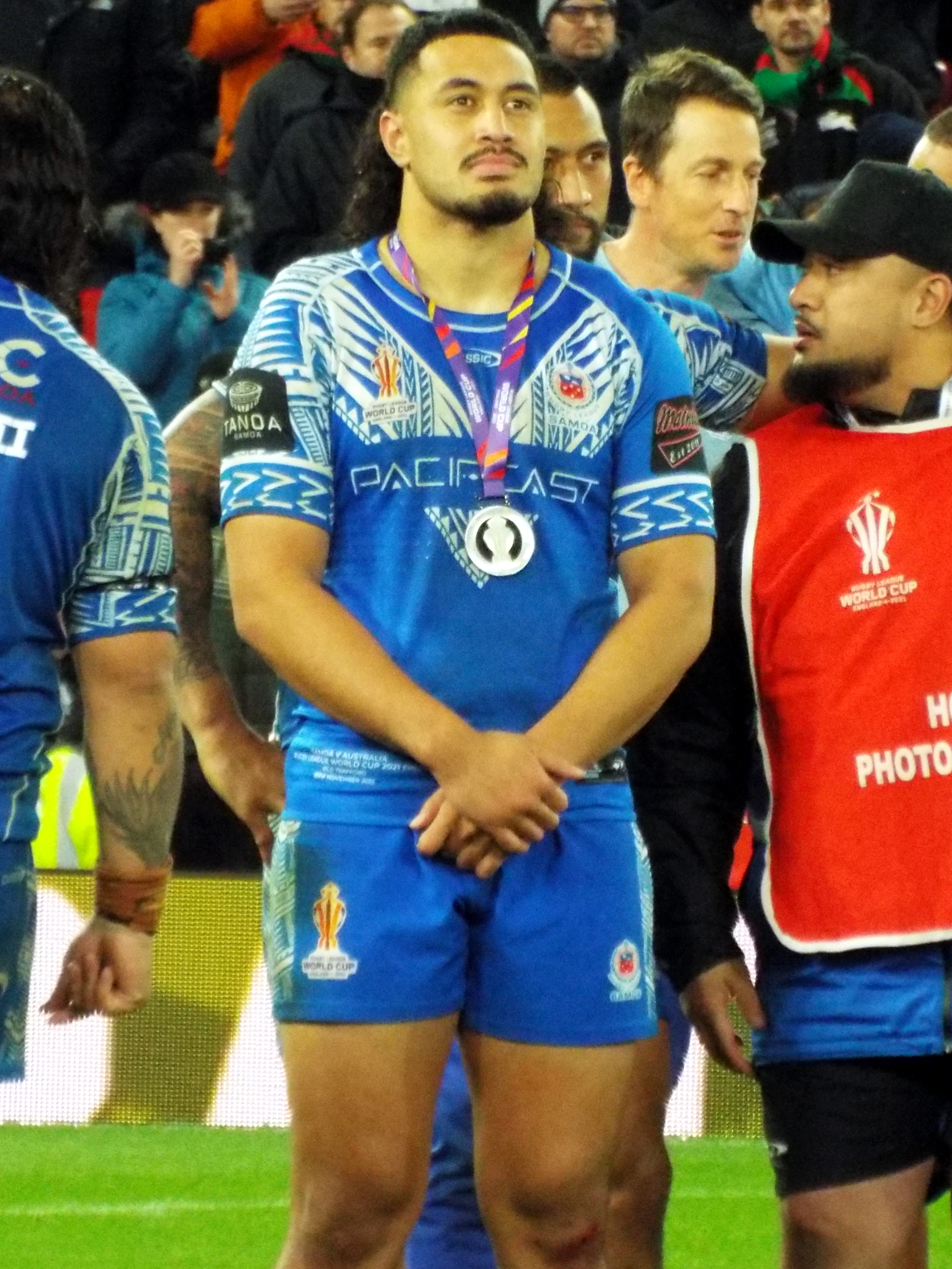

Personal information
- Born: 16 February 1999 (age 27) Apia, Samoa
- Height: 188 cm (6 ft 2 in)
- Weight: 109 kg (17 st 2 lb)

Playing information
- Position: Second-row
Club
Years	Team	Pld	T	G	FG	P
2021–22	Wests Tigers	27	2	0	0	8
2023	Manly Sea Eagles	17	1	0	0	4
2024–26	Parramatta Eels	45	10	0	0	40
2027-	Melbourne Storm	0	0	0	0	0
	Total	89	13	0	0	52
Representative
Years	Team	Pld	T	G	FG	P
2022	Samoa	4	0	0	0	0
- Source: As of 21 August 2026

Kelma Tuilagi (born 16 February 1999) is a Samoan professional rugby league footballer who plays as a second-row forward for the Parramatta Eels in the National Rugby League and Samoa at international level.

He previously played for the Manly Warringah Sea Eagles and Wests Tigers in the National Rugby League.

== Early life ==
Tuilagi was born in Apia, Samoa, he then moved to New Zealand. He attended Waitakere College in Auckland from 2013.

Tuilagi played junior rugby league with Glenora Bears, representing the Junior Kiwis in 2018.

After moving to Melbourne, Victoria, Australia he was educated at Hallam Secondary College, Tuilagi played with Casey Warriors in the Melbourne Rugby League. Playing junior representative rugby league with the Victorian Thunderbolts, Tuilagi was signed on a development contract with Melbourne Storm, spending most of his time with feeder club Easts Tigers in the Queensland Cup.

== Playing career ==
=== 2021 ===
In round 20 of the 2021 NRL season, Tuilagi made his debut for the Wests Tigers against the New Zealand Warriors.

In round 22, he scored his first try in the NRL during a 24–16 victory over North Queensland.

=== 2022 ===
In October, Tuilagi was named in the Samoa squad for the 2021 Rugby League World Cup.

=== 2023 ===
Tuilagi played 17 matches for Manly in the 2023 NRL season as the club finished 12th on the table and missed the finals. On 16 October, Tuilagi signed a two-year contract to join Parramatta starting in the 2024 season.

=== 2024 ===
In round 1 of the 2024 NRL season, Tuilagi made his club debut for Parramatta as they defeated arch-rivals Canterbury 28-6. In round 15, Tuilagi was replaced on report during Parramatta's loss against the Sydney Roosters for a dangerous lifting tackle. Tuilagi was due to challenge the decision at the NRL Judiciary but was ruled out for five weeks with a thumb injury. Tuilagi was suspended for a total of four matches. He made a total of 16 appearances in 2024 for the club as they finished 15th on the table. On 3 December 2024, the Parramatta outfit announced that Tuilagi had re-signed with the club until the end of 2026.

=== 2025 ===
Tuilagi played 12 games for Parramatta in the 2025 NRL season as the club finished 11th on the table.

=== 2026 ===
On 18 August, Melbourne announced that they had signed Tuilagi for the 2027 season. Tuilagi played 17 matches for Parramatta in the 2026 NRL season as the club finished 13th on the table.

== Statistics ==
Year	Team	Games	Tries	Pts
2021	Wests Tigers	5	2	8
2022	Wests Tigers	22		
2023	Manly Warringah Sea Eagles	17	1	4
2024	Parramatta Eels	16	3	12
2025	Parramatta Eels	12	2	8
2026	Parramatta Eels	17	5	20
	Totals	89	13	52
