= Northern Thunder RLFC =

Australian rugby league club based in Broadmeadows, VIC

Club information
- Full name: Northern Thunder Rugby League Football Club
- Short name: Thunder
- Colours
- Founded: 1999; 27 years ago

Current details
- Ground: Seabrook Reserve, Broadmeadows
- Competition: Melbourne Rugby League

Records
- Premierships: 1 (2024 (Men's 2nd grade))

Northern Thunder Rugby League Club is an Australian rugby league football club based in Broadmeadows, Victoria formed in the late 1990s. They field men's, women's and juniors teams in the Storm Premiership competitions.

Since 2024 the club plays matches at Seabrook Reserve, which doubles as the training and administration base for NRL Victoria.

== Notable juniors ==
The following Northern Thunder players went on to play professional first grade rugby league:

- Young Tonumaipea (2014–2024 Melbourne Storm & Gold Coast Titans)
- Richard Kennar (2015–2024 Melbourne Storm, South Sydney Rabbitohs & Brisbane Broncos)
- Aaron Teroi (2016–2017 Newcastle Thunder)
- Sualauvi Fa'alogo (2023–present Melbourne Storm)

=== Other juniors ===
- Chanel Seigafo (2014–2015 Melbourne Storm U20)

== See also ==
- Rugby league in Victoria
