= Zev John =

PNG international rugby league footballer

Personal information
- Full name: Zev John
- Born: 14 June 1998 (age 28) Western Highlands Province, Papua New Guinea
- Height: 1.74 m (5 ft 9 in)
- Weight: 94 kg (14 st 11 lb)

Playing information
- Position: Prop
Club
| Years | Team | Pld | T | G | FG | P |
|---|---|---|---|---|---|---|
| 2019 | Redcliffe Dolphins | 3 | 0 | 0 | 0 | 0 |
| 2022– | Central Queensland Capras | 36 | 2 | 0 | 0 | 8 |
| | Total | 39 | 2 | 0 | 0 | 8 |
Representative
| Years | Team | Pld | T | G | FG | P |
| 2019– | Papua New Guinea | 1 | 0 | 0 | 0 | 0 |
| 2022 | PNG Prime Minister's XIII | 1 | 0 | 0 | 0 | 0 |
- Source: As of 6 November 2026

Zev John (born 14 June 1998) is a Papua New Guinean professional rugby league footballer who plays as a prop forward for the Central Queensland Capras in the Queensland Cup and Papua New Guinea at international level.

== Early life ==
John was born in Mount Hagen, Papua New Guinea and moved to Australia in 2015. He played junior rugby league for Altona Roosters and then graduated into the Victoria under 20’s in 2017. He was part of the Melbourne Storm development squad from 2016-18.

== Career ==
John then made his Queensland Intrust Cup debut for Redcliffe Dolphins. He made his international debut for Papua New Guinea in their 24-6 defeat by Samoa in the 2019 Oceania Cup. John joined the Mackay Cutters for the 2020 season.
