= Dean Ieremia =

Samoan rugby league footballer

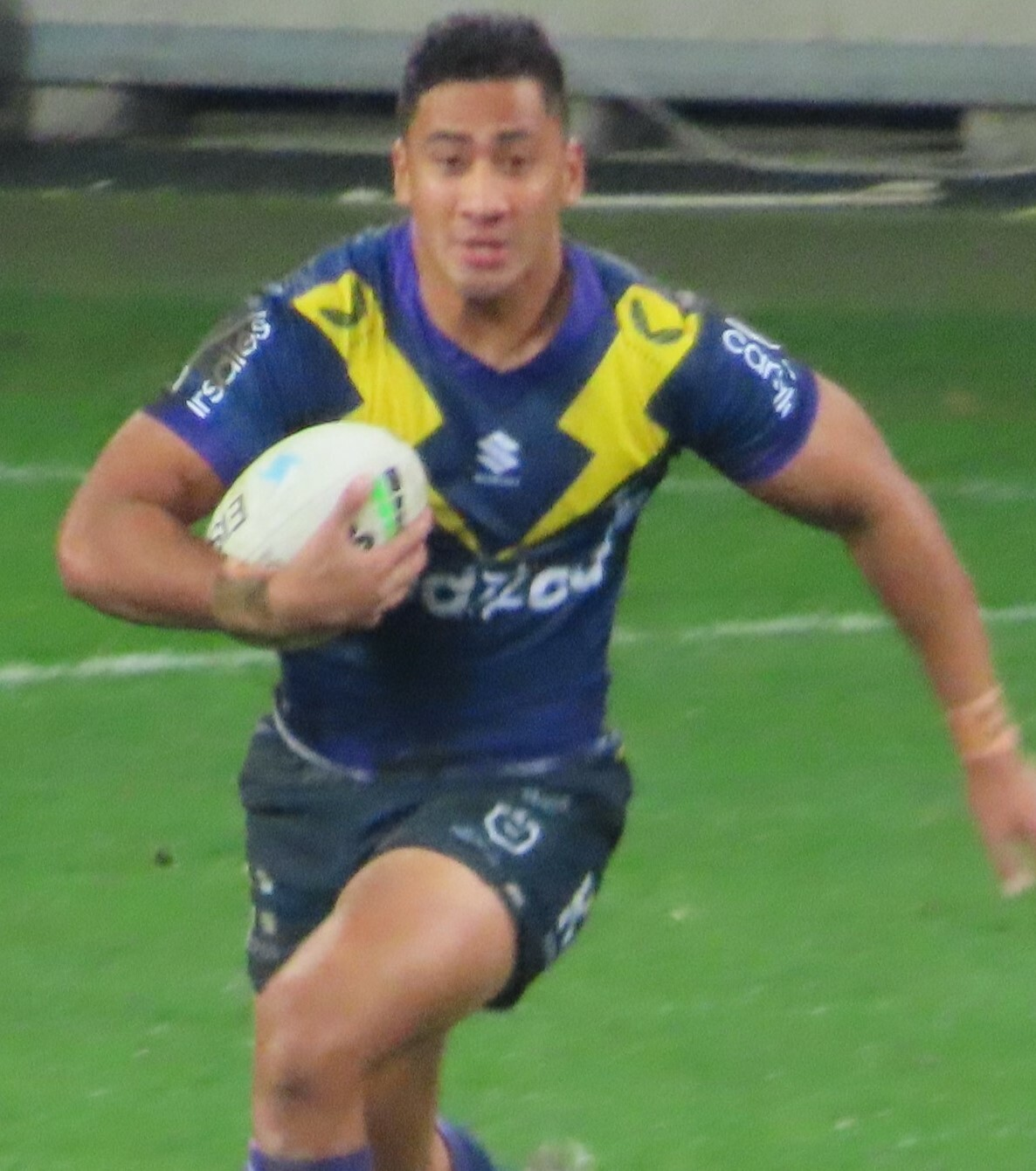

Personal information
- Born: 20 August 2001 (age 25) Fagaloa, Upolu, Samoa
- Height: 179 cm (5 ft 10 in)
- Weight: 91 kg (14 st 5 lb)

Playing information
- Position: Wing, Centre
Club
| Years | Team | Pld | T | G | FG | P |
|---|---|---|---|---|---|---|
| 2021–24 | Melbourne Storm | 23 | 10 | 0 | 0 | 40 |
| 2026 | Gold Coast Titans | 5 | 1 | 0 | 0 | 4 |
| | Total | 28 | 11 | 0 | 0 | 44 |
- Source: As of 19 July 2026

Dean Ieremia (born 20 August 2001) is a Samoan professional rugby league footballer who plays for the Gold Coast Titans in the National Rugby League (NRL). He previously played for the Melbourne Storm.

== Background ==
Ieremia was born in Fagaloa, Samoa and raised in Melbourne, Australia. While living in Melbourne, he was educated at Sunbury Downs College and then at Mount Ridley College, Craigieburn.

Ieremia played his junior rugby league for the Sunbury Tigers and graduated through the Victorian Thunderbolts system before signing with Melbourne Storm.

== Playing career ==
Ieremia made his NRL debut for Melbourne against Cronulla-Sutherland. He became the fourth player to graduate from the NRL Victoria junior system. Ieremia played a total of 10 games for Melbourne in the 2021 NRL season and scored six tries as the club won 19 matches in a row and claimed the Minor Premiership. Ieremia did not play in the club's finals campaign where Melbourne suffered a shock 10-6 loss against eventual premiers Penrith.

=== 2023 ===
On 22 February 2023, it was announced that Ieremia would miss the entire 2023 NRL season after rupturing his ACL during a pre-season trial game against the New Zealand Warriors.

=== 2024 ===
On 29 September 2024, he played for North Sydney in their NSW Cup Grand Final loss against Newtown.

=== 2025 ===
On 16 January 2025, Ieremia had been ruled out for six months after he suffered an Achilles rupture during pre-season training. Ieremia was released by the Storm at the end of the season.

=== 2026 ===
In March 2026, Ieremia signed with the Gold Coast Titans after a successful train-and-trial deal. He made his club debut against his former side, the Storm, at AAMI Park in Round 19. On 18 November 2026, the Titans announced that Ieremia had re-signed with the club until the end of 2028.
