= Jamayne Taunoa-Brown =

Australian rugby league footballer

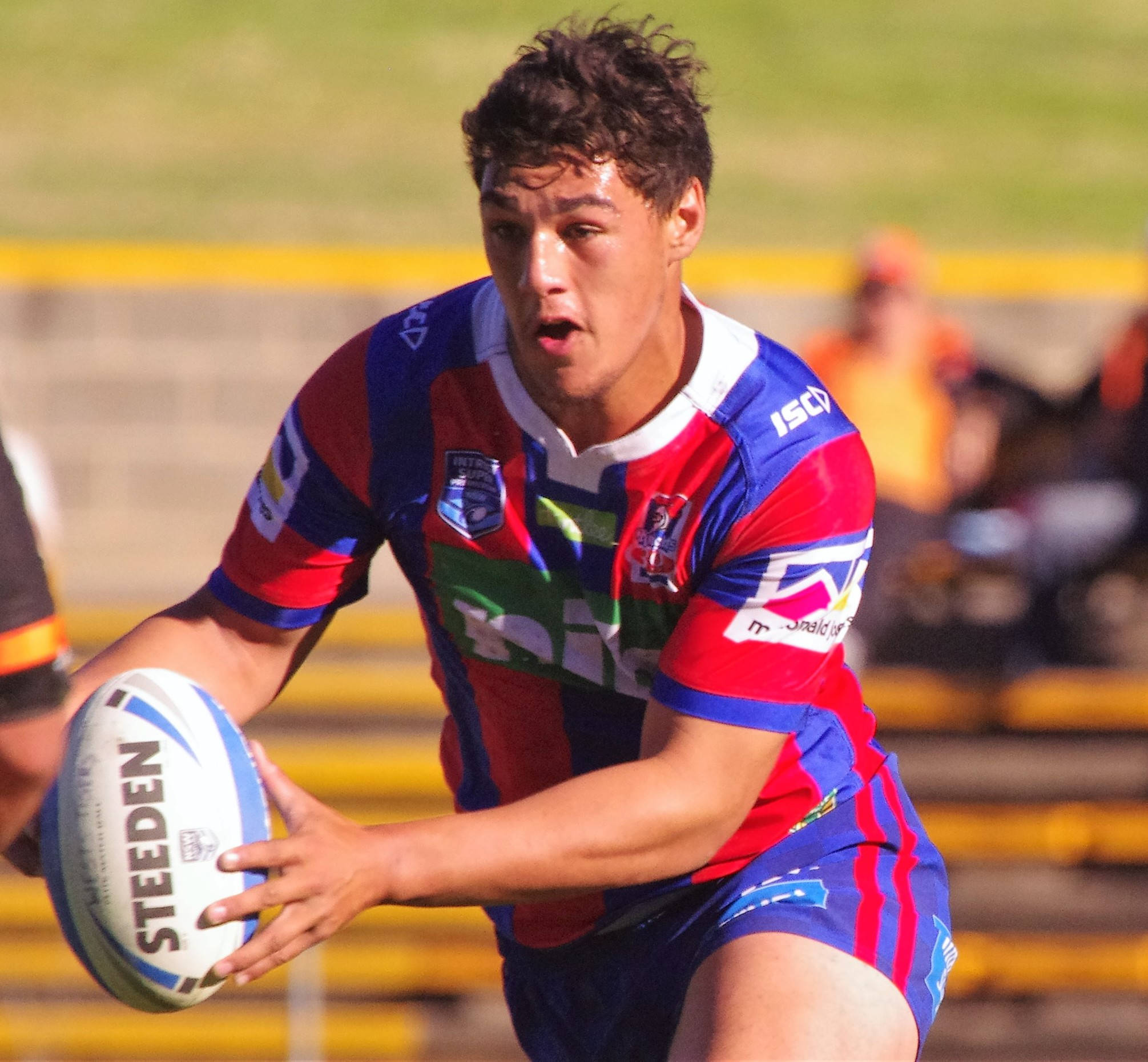

Personal information
- Full name: Jamayne Taunoa Brown
- Born: 17 November 1996 (age 30) Melbourne, Victoria, Australia

Playing information
- Height: 194 cm (6 ft 4 in)
- Weight: 111 kg (17 st 7 lb)
- Position: Prop
Club
Years	Team	Pld	T	G	FG	P
2020–21	New Zealand Warriors	32	1	0	0	4
2021(loan)	→ St. George Illawarra	2	0	0	0	0
2022–23	North Qld Cowboys	33	0	0	0	0
	Total	67	1	0	0	4
Representative
Years	Team	Pld	T	G	FG	P
2020–21	Indigenous All Stars	3	0	0	0	0

Jamayne Taunoa-Brown (born 17 November 1996) is an Australian former professional rugby league footballer.

He played as prop for the New Zealand Warriors, St. George Illawarra Dragons and North Queensland Cowboys in the National Rugby League (NRL).

== Early life ==
Taunoa-Brown was born in Melbourne, Australia, and is of Indigenous Australian (Kaurna and Narungga) descent through his mother Jaimie who is from South Australia, and Māori (Ngāti Kahungunu) through his father Brandy who is from Napier, New Zealand. He played his junior rugby league for the Altona Roosters where he then went onto play junior representative rugby league for both the Melbourne Storm and Newcastle Knights.

== Playing career ==
Taunoa-Brown represented the Indigenous All Stars in the 2020 All Stars match.

Taunoa-Brown made his NRL debut in round 1 of the 2020 NRL season for the New Zealand Warriors against the Newcastle Knights starting from the bench, in the 20–0 loss. He scored his first try in the Warriors' 18–0 win over the St. George Illawarra Dragons in round 3 of the same season. Taunoa-Brown joined the St. George Illawarra Dragons in July 2021 on a short-term loan deal. On 21 October 2021, he was granted a release by the Warriors from the final year of his contract and signed with the North Queensland Cowboys until the end of the 2023 season.

=== 2022 ===
Taunoa-Brown represented the Indigenous All Stars again in the 2022 All Stars match. He played 16 matches for the Cowboys in the 2022 NRL season as the club finished third on the table and qualified for the finals. Taunoa-Brown did not feature in the Cowboy's finals campaign which ended at the preliminary final stage against Parramatta. During the 2022 season he also made two appearances for the Cowboy's Queensland Cup feeder club, the Northern Pride.

=== 2023 ===
He made 17 appearances for North Queensland in the 2023 NRL season as the club finished 11th on the table.

=== 2024 ===
On 19 November 2024, it was announced that the Cowboys were set to offer Taunoa-Brown a lifeline for his career to get back on track but just a day later on 20 November, after missing the entire 2024 NRL season with back-to-back Achilles injuries, he announced his immediate retirement from rugby league.

== Statistics ==
Year	Team	Games	Tries	Pts
2020	New Zealand Warriors	19	1	4
2021	New Zealand Warriors	13		
2021	St. George Illawarra Dragons	2		
2022	North Queensland Cowboys	16		
2023	North Queensland Cowboys	17		
	Totals	67	1	4

== Music career ==
Taunoa-Brown is also a rapper and hip hop producer, going under the pseudonym "Yung Maynie".
