= Fonua Pole =

NZ Rugby league footballer

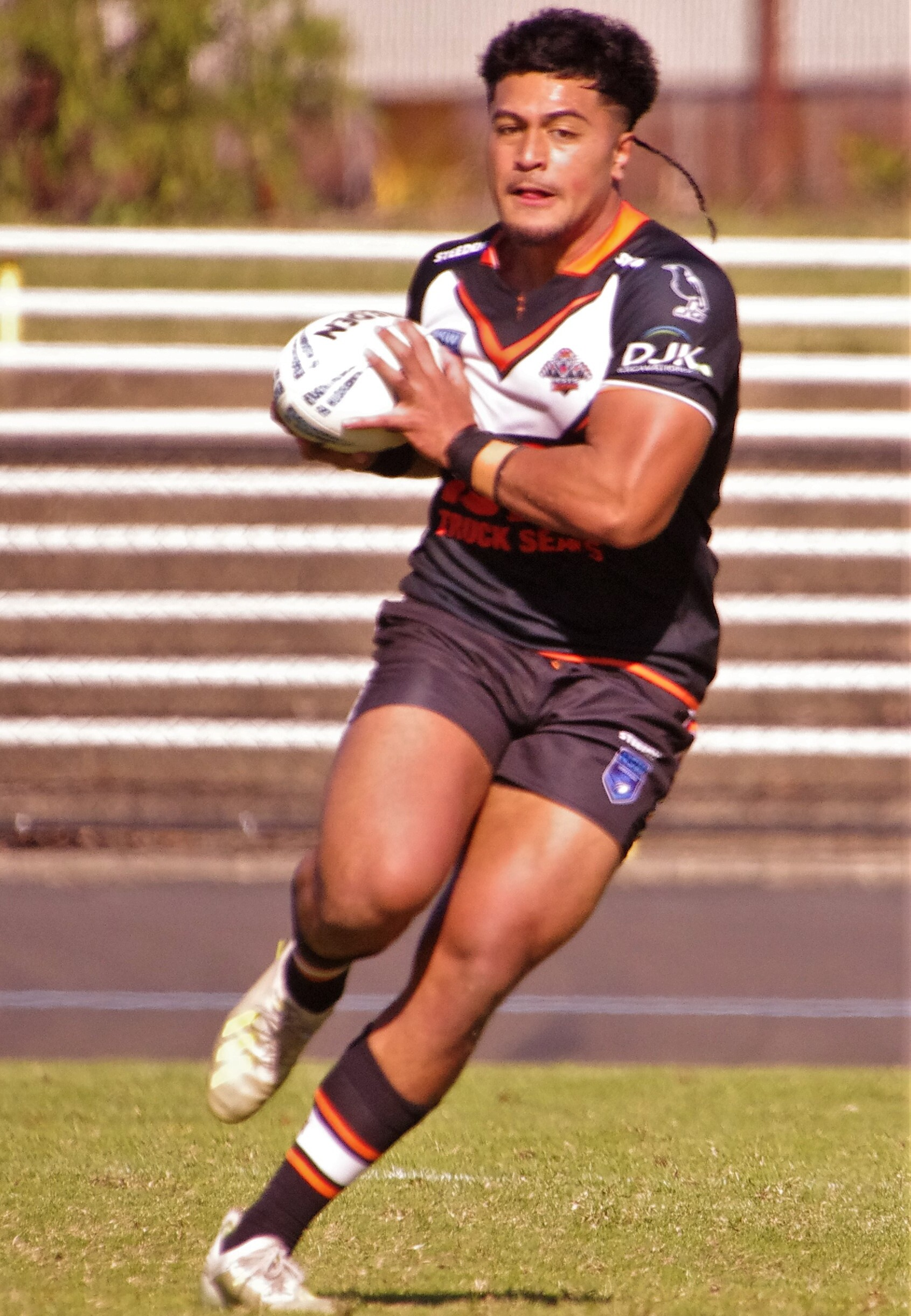

Personal information
- Full name: Fonua Pole
- Born: 2 June 2002 (age 24) Wellington, New Zealand
- Height: 184 cm (6 ft 0 in)
- Weight: 110 kg (17 st 5 lb)

Playing information
- Position: Prop, Lock
Club
Years	Team	Pld	T	G	FG	P
2022–	Wests Tigers	101	10	0	0	40
- Source: As of 6 September 2026

Fonua Pole (born 2 June 2002) is a New Zealand professional rugby league footballer who plays as a prop or lock forward for the Wests Tigers in the National Rugby League (NRL).

== Background ==
Pole was born in Wellington, New Zealand, and raised in Victoria. He was educated at Mount Ridley College, Craigieburn playing Australian rules football in his youth before his mum encouraged him to play his junior rugby league for Craigieburn Phoenix and Sunbury Tigers. He said, "It started to become a bit of an issue because mum didn’t like that in AFL most of the games and trainings were on Sundays, when she always wanted us to go to church."

Graduating through the Victorian Thunderbolts system, he was spotted by Wests Tigers playing for a Combined Affiliated States side at the Australian Schoolboys Championships.

== Career ==
=== 2022 ===
Pole made his first grade debut for the Wests Tigers against the New Zealand Warriors in round 16, becoming Wests Tigers player no. 257. It was the Warriors' first home game in nearly 2 years due to the COVID-19 pandemic, in front of a sold-out crowd. Pole said, "“It was 100 percent Warriors crowd just screaming at us, I think I got slandered on the sideline a bit and someone was yelling at me that they felt sorry for me and didn’t want me to go on."

The next week, he was named in the starting team after a late withdrawal from James Tamou, and ran for a game-best 167 metres and made 17 tackles without a miss. He then remained in first grade for the remainder of the season, and was named the club's Rookie of the Year.

=== 2023 ===
Pole played a total of 23 games for the Wests Tigers in the 2023 NRL season as the club finished with the Wooden Spoon for a second straight year.

=== 2024 ===
Pole made 23 appearances for the Wests Tigers throughout the 2024 NRL season as the club finished with the wooden spoon for a third consecutive year. On 22 November, the Wests Tigers announced that Pole had re-signed with the club until 2027.

=== 2025 ===
Pole played a total of 21 matches for the Wests Tigers in the 2025 NRL season as the club finished 13th on the table.

=== 2026 ===
Pole played every match for the Wests Tigers in the 2026 NRL season as the club finished 15th on the table.

== Statistics ==
Year	Team	Games	Tries	Pts
2022	Wests Tigers	10		
2023	Wests Tigers	23	4	16
2024	Wests Tigers	23	4	16
2025	Wests Tigers	21	1	4
2026	Wests Tigers	23	1	4
	Totals	100	10	40
