= Richard Kennar =

Samoan rugby league footballer (born 1994)

Richie Kennar
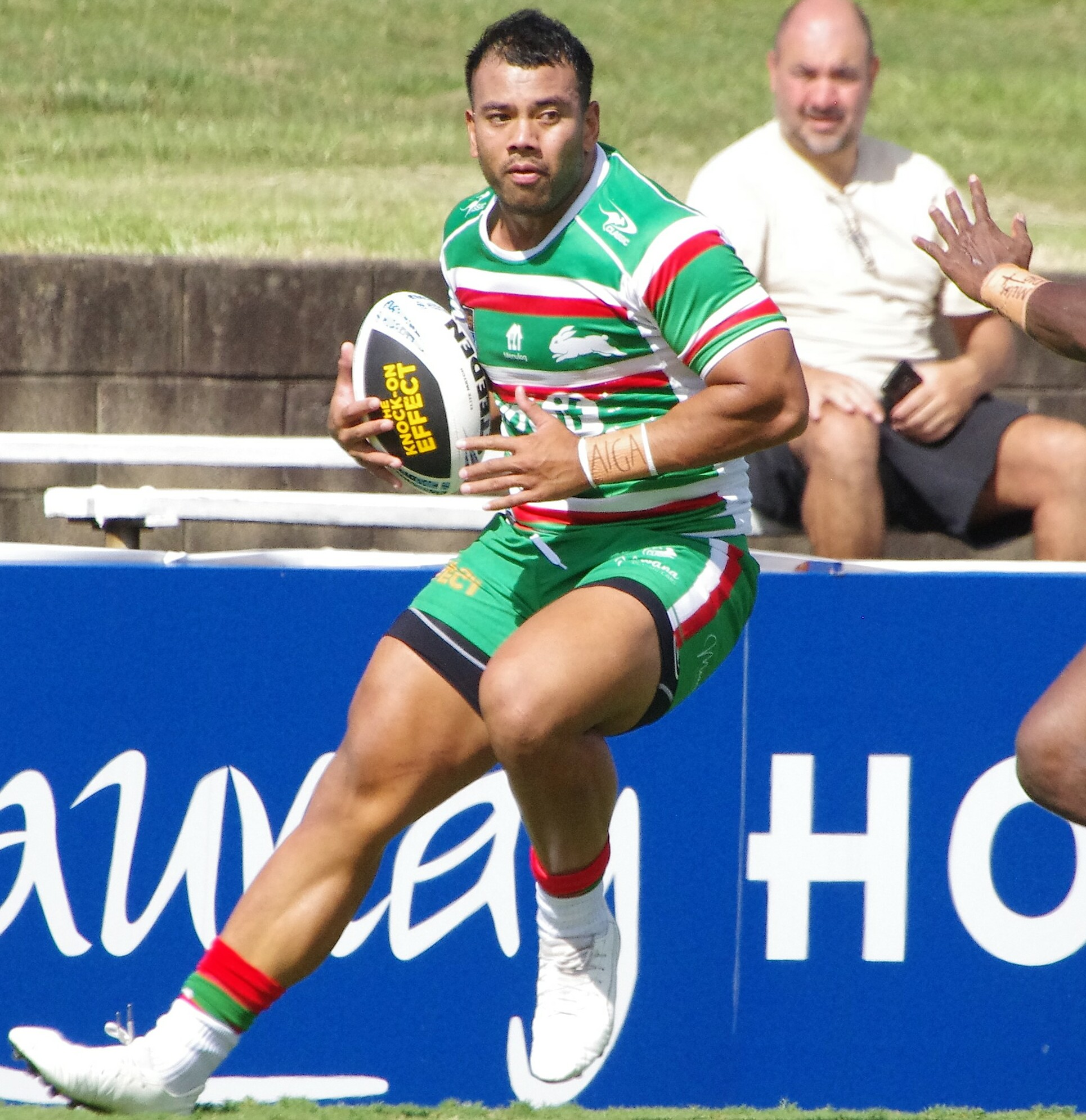

Personal information
- Full name: Richard Kennar
- Born: 10 December 1994 (age 31) Apia, Samoa
- Height: 186 cm (6 ft 1 in)
- Weight: 101 kg (15 st 13 lb)

Playing information
- Position: Wing, Centre
Club
Years	Team	Pld	T	G	FG	P
2015–16	Melbourne Storm	9	2	0	0	8
2018	South Sydney	8	7	0	0	28
2019–21	Brisbane Broncos	14	3	0	0	12
2022–24	South Sydney	19	10	0	0	40
	Total	50	22	0	0	88
Representative
Years	Team	Pld	T	G	FG	P
2019	Queensland Residents	1	0	0	0	0
- Source: As of 6 September 2024

Richard Kennar (born 10 December 1994) is a Samoan professional rugby league footballer who last played as a winger and centre for the South Sydney Rabbitohs in the NRL.

He previously played for the Melbourne Storm and the Brisbane Broncos, and was contracted to the Canterbury-Bankstown Bulldogs in the National Rugby League.

== Early life ==
Kennar was born in Apia, Samoa, and moved to Melbourne, Victoria, Australia at a young age. He studied at Roxburgh Secondary College, and was then educated at Craigieburn Secondary College where he represented 2011 Australian Schoolboys.

He played his junior rugby league for the Northern Thunder, before being signed by the Melbourne Storm.

== Playing career ==
=== Early career ===
From 2012 to 2014, he played for the Melbourne Storm's NYC team.

He 2015 he moved on to the Storm's Queensland Cup team, Eastern Suburbs Tigers.

=== 2015 ===
In round 13 of the 2015 NRL season, Kennar made his NRL debut for the Melbourne Storm against Penrith. He played six games in his debut season, scoring one try.

=== 2016 ===
Kennar played a further three games for Melbourne in 2016, scoring one try. In November, he signed a two-year contract with the Canterbury-Bankstown Bulldogs starting in 2017.

=== 2017 ===
Kennar was unable to break into Canterbury's first-grade team in 2017.

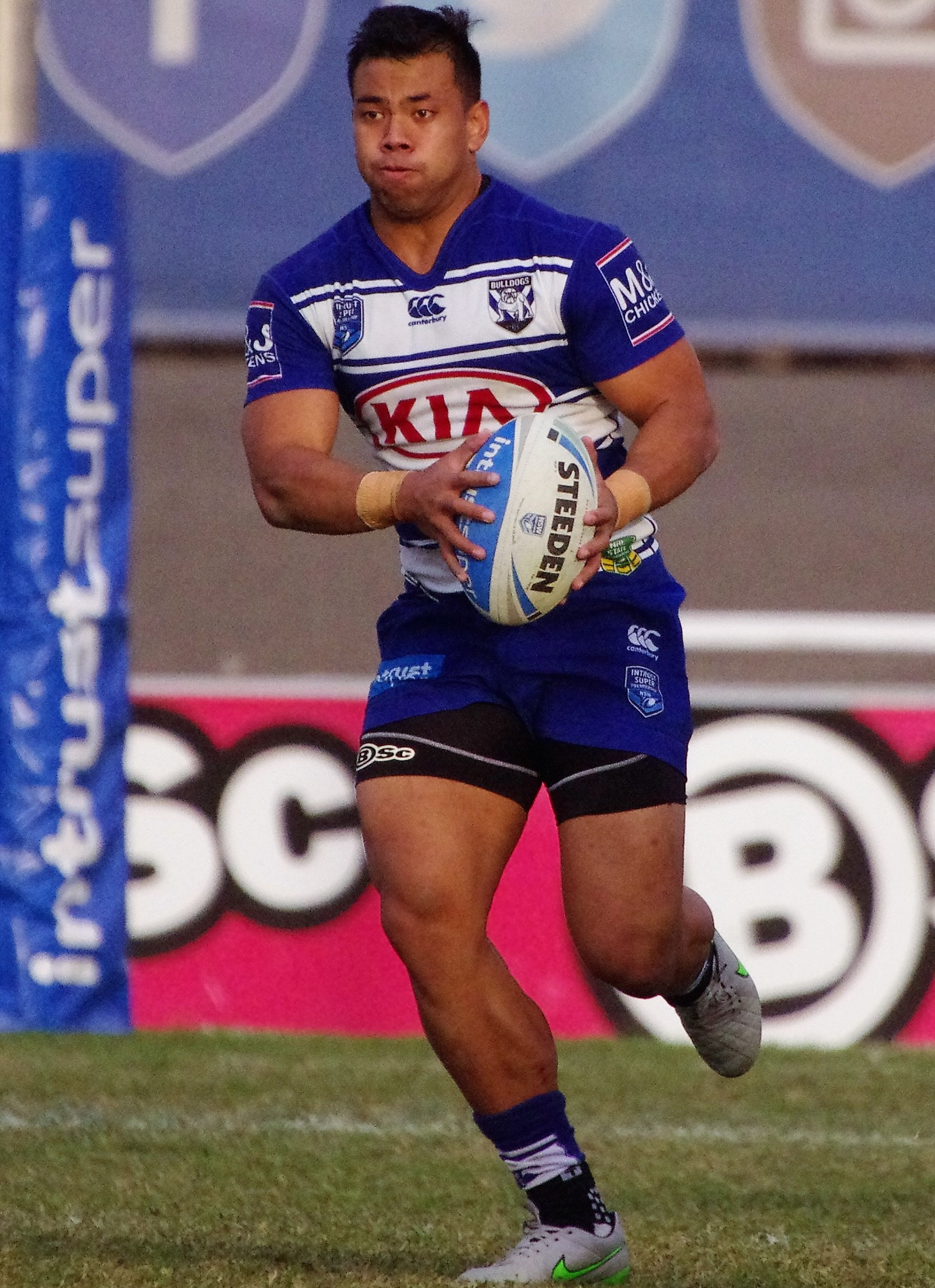
Kennar playing for the Bulldogs in 2017

In October, he was granted a release from his Canterbury contract and signed a two-year contract with the South Sydney Rabbitohs starting in 2018.

=== 2018 ===
Kennar made his South Sydney debut in round 1 of the season, scoring two tries in Souths 32–20 defeat by the New Zealand Warriors. On the 15th of June it was announced that Kennar would be released from his final year at South Sydney Rabbitohs to complete a two-year Mormon mission at the start of 2019.

=== 2019 ===
He later signed a train and trial contract with the Brisbane Broncos.

=== 2020 ===
In round 12 of the 2020 NRL season, Kennar scored two tries for Brisbane in a 36–26 loss to Cronulla at Suncorp Stadium.

Kennar played a total of 10 games for Brisbane in the 2020 NRL season as the club suffered their worst ever year both on and off the field culminating in the club's first Wooden Spoon.

=== 2021 ===
Kennar made only two appearances for Brisbane in the 2021 NRL season.

=== 2022 ===
Kennar then rejoined South Sydney for the 2022 NRL season. In round 17, Kennar scored a hat-trick in South Sydney's victory over Newcastle.

Kennar was called into the South Sydney side as cover for the injured Alex Johnston for their preliminary final match against Penrith. Kennar scored a first half try during the game as Souths lead 12-0 before Penrith came back in the second half to win 32-12.

=== 2023 ===
Kennar was limited to only five games for Souths in the 2023 NRL season as the club finished 9th on the table and missed the finals. Kennar re-signed with South Sydney ahead of the 2024 NRL season.

=== 2024 ===
In round 1 of the 2024 NRL season, Kennar scored two tries for South Sydney in their 36-24 loss against Manly at the Allegiant Stadium in Las Vegas. Kennar played 12 games for South Sydney in 2024 as the club finished 16th on the table.
