= Francis Tualau =

Tongan rugby league footballer

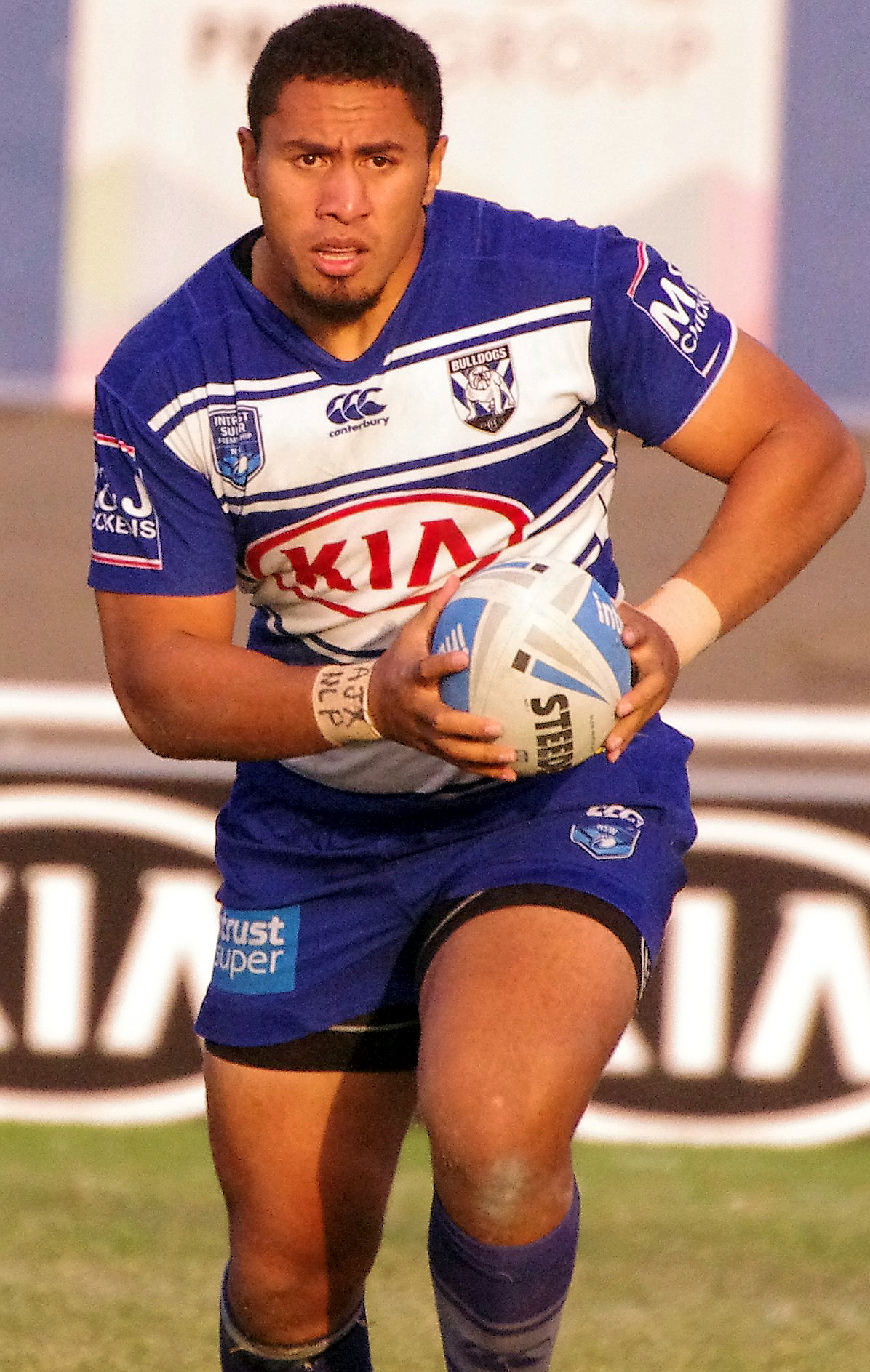

Personal information
- Born: 23 May 1994 (age 31) Tofua, Tonga
- Height: 187 cm (6 ft 2 in)
- Weight: 106 kg (16 st 10 lb)

Playing information
- Position: Prop
Club
Years	Team	Pld	T	G	FG	P
2017–18	Canterbury Bulldogs	10	0	0	0	0
Representative
Years	Team	Pld	T	G	FG	P
2016	Queensland Residents	1	0	0	0	0
- Source: As of 7 January 2024

Francis Tualau (born 23 May 1994) is a Tongan professional rugby league footballer who last played as a prop for the Canterbury-Bankstown Bulldogs in the NRL.

== Background ==
Tualau was born in Tofua, Tonga.

He played his junior rugby league for the Mangere East Hawks in New Zealand, and South Eastern Titans in Victoria, Australia, before being signed by the Melbourne Storm.

== Playing career ==
=== Early career ===
In 2013 and 2014, Tualau played for the Melbourne Storm's NYC team, before graduating to their Queensland Cup team, Eastern Suburbs Tigers in 2015. In October 2016, he signed a 3-year contract with the Canterbury-Bankstown Bulldogs until the end of 2019.

=== 2017 ===
In round 12 of the 2017 NRL season, Tualau made his NRL debut for the Bulldogs against the Cronulla-Sutherland Sharks.
