= Trent Toelau =

Australian rugby league footballer

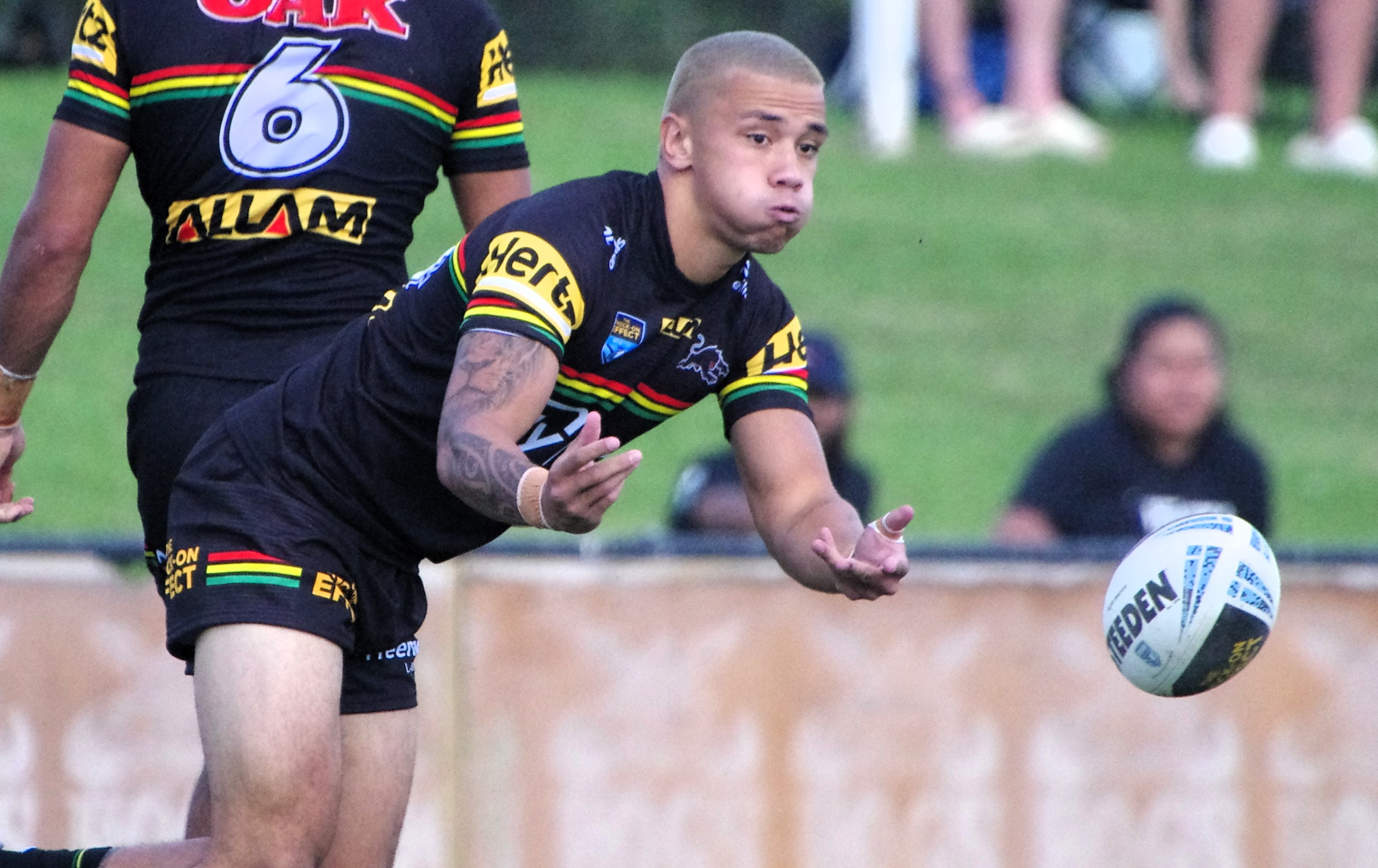

Personal information
- Full name: Trent Toelau
- Born: 12 November 1999 (age 26) Australia
- Height: 180 cm (5 ft 11 in)
- Weight: 87 kg (13 st 10 lb)

Playing information
- Position: Five-eighth
Club
Years	Team	Pld	T	G	FG	P
2024–25	Penrith Panthers	11	1	0	0	4
2026–	Melbourne Storm	11	1	0	0	4
	Total	22	2	0	0	8
- Source: Fox Sports As of 5 September 2026

Trent Toelau is an Australian rugby league footballer who plays as a five-eighth and bench utility for the Melbourne Storm in the National Rugby League (NRL).

He previously played for the Penrith Panthers.

== Playing career ==
=== Early career ===
A Doveton Steelers junior, Toelau twice won the Darren Bell Medal as the Melbourne Storm's best under-20s player in 2018 and 2019.

=== Penrith Panthers ===
Leaving Melbourne, Toelau earned a contract with the Penrith Panthers after training with the club during the 2021 preseason. He would make a few appearances in the Panthers' NSW Cup squad in both the 2021 and 2022 seasons, before cementing his spot in the team in either the five-eighth or halfback positions during the 2023 season.

Toelau made his NRL debut in round 13 of the 2024 NRL season against the St George Illawarra Dragons, coming from the bench. Scoring his first career try against the Dragons later in the season, Toelau would make nine appearances for the Panthers during the 2024 season, while he was an unused interchange player in a further three matches. He did not feature in the 2024 NRL finals series in which the Panthers won their fourth straight premiership.

He made his first NRL start in round four of the 2025 NRL season, named at halfback in place of an injured Nathan Cleary.

=== Melbourne Storm ===
In late 2025, Toelau returned to the Melbourne Storm ahead of the 2026 NRL season, signing a one year contract with the club. On 17 September 2026, the Victorian club announced Toelau had re-signed until the end of 2027. He played eleven matches for Melbourne in the 2026 NRL season as the club finished 10th on the table, missing the finals for the first time since 2010.
