= Altona Roosters =

Australian rugby league football club, based in Melbourne, VIC

Club information
- Full name: Altona Roosters Rugby League Football Club
- Short name: Roosters
- Colours: Navy Blue; White; Red
- Founded: 1987; 39 years ago
- Website: https://altonaroosters.com.au/

Current details
- Ground: Bruce Comben Reserve, Altona
- CEO: Efu Koka
- Competition: Melbourne Rugby League
- Current season

Records
- Premierships: 8 (1997, 2003, 2004, 2005, 2006, 2008, 2010, 2012)
- Runners-up: 3 (2002, 2007, 2013)

Altona Roosters Rugby League Club is an Australian rugby league football club based in West Melbourne formed in the late 1980s. They conduct teams for both junior and senior teams. The club has also produced a number of juniors for the Melbourne Storm SG Ball, National Youth Competition and National Rugby League.

== Notable Juniors ==
Following are player that went on to play professional first grade rugby league.

- Jeremy Smith (2004-16 Melbourne Storm, St George, Cronulla and Newcastle)
- Gareth Widdop (2010- Melbourne Storm, St George & Warrington)
- Drury Low (2010-14 Canberra Raiders, Canterbury)
- Charnze Nicoll-Klokstad (2017- New Zealand Warriors & Canberra Raiders)
- Ben Nakubuwai (2017-19 Gold Coast Titans & Salford Red Devils)
- Zev John (2019 Papua New Guinea Kumuls)
- Jamayne Taunoa-Brown (2020- New Zealand Warriors)
- Siulagi Tuimalatu-Brown (2025- Melbourne Storm)

== See also ==
- Rugby league in Victoria
