= Connor Donehue =

US international rugby league player

Personal information
- Born: May 9, 1996 (age 30) Torrance, California, United States
- Height: 5 ft 7 in (170 cm)
- Weight: 181 lb (82 kg)

Playing information
- Position: Hooker, Halfback
Club
Years	Team	Pld	T	G	FG	P
2019–	Brooklyn Kings RLFC	2	0	0	0	0
Representative
Years	Team	Pld	T	G	FG	P
2018	United States	2	2	0	0	8
2019	United States 9s	3	0	0	0	0
- As of October 23, 2019

Connor Donehue (born May 9, 1996) is an American-born rugby league player who plays as a hooker or halfback, most recently playing for the Brooklyn Kings RLFC in the NARL.

== Background ==
Donehue was born in Torrance, California. His father, John, a Brazilian jiu-jitsu black belt from Australia, was living in California at the time. Donehue moved to Melbourne as a child when his father took a job with the Melbourne Storm as a defensive coach.

== Playing career ==
Donehue began his rugby league career coming through the Melbourne Storm system and eventually played for the Sunshine Coast Falcons in the Queensland Cup. In 2019 he joined the Brooklyn Kings, where they won the 2019 USA Rugby League Championship final. He represented the United States in the 2019 Rugby League World Cup 9s.
