= Rugby league in Australia =

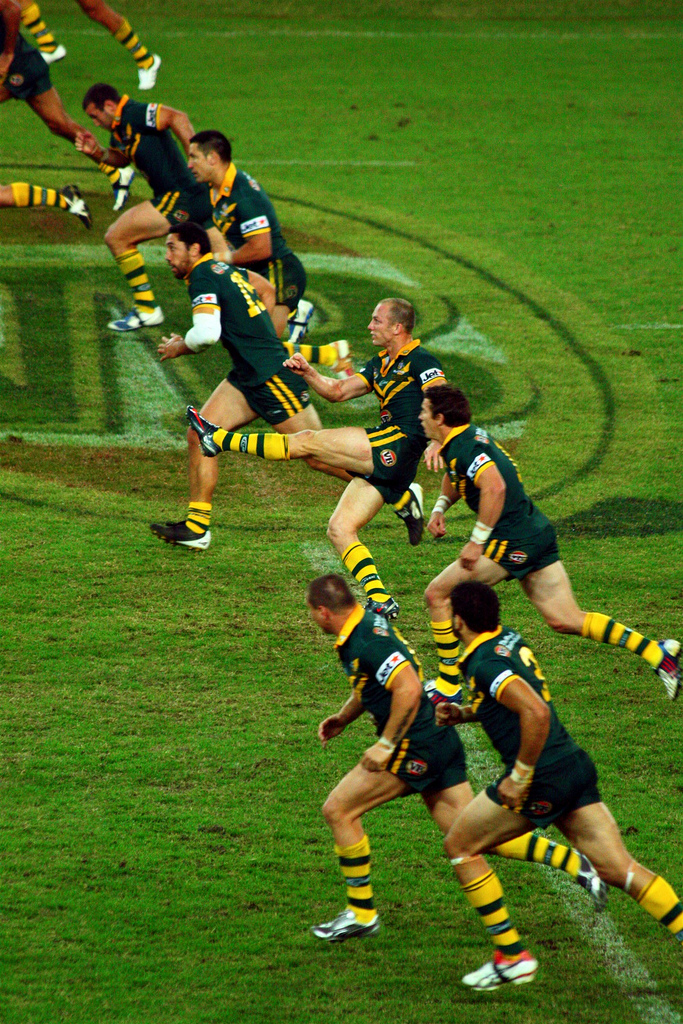
- Darren Lockyer (fourth from bottom), Australia's most-capped player, kicking off for the national team in 2009.
- Country: Australia
- Governing body: Australian Rugby League Commission
- National team: Australia
- Nickname: Kangaroos
- First played: 1907, Sydney, New South Wales
- Registered players: 174,343 (adult); 93,287 (child)
- Clubs: 17 Elite; 32 Professional; 1077 Amateur

National competitions
- NRL Telstra Premiership; State of Origin

Club competitions
- New South Wales; Intrust Super Premiership; Ron Massey Cup; Newcastle Rugby League; Illawarra Rugby League; Sydney Shield; Penrith District Rugby League; Country Rugby League Queensland; Queensland Cup; FOGS Cup; FOGS Colts Challenge; Foley Shield Australian Capital Territory; Canberra Rugby League competition Tasmania; Tasmania Rugby League Victoria; Storm Premiership; The Murray Cup; Central Highlands Rugby League South Australia; Adelaide Premiership Western Australia; Smarter Than Smoking Premiership; Pilbara Rugby League Northern Territory; Central Australian Rugby League; Katherine Rugby League Darwin Rugby League

Audience records
- Single match: 107,999 – 1999 NRL Grand Final
- Season: 3,151,039 – National Rugby League season 2010

In Australia, rugby league is a popular spectator and participation sport which has been played since 1908. It is the dominant winter football code in the states of New South Wales and Queensland. According to Ausplay in 2024, there were 174,343 adult and 93,287 children playing it across five states at a participation rate of 0.8% per capita. Just under half of adult players are female. It is governed by the Australian Rugby League Commission based in Sydney.

In 2022, it was the most watched sport on Australian television with an aggregate audience of 137.3 million viewers. The premier club competition is the National Rugby League (NRL), which features teams from four states/territories: ten teams from New South Wales; four teams from Queensland; and one team each from Victoria and the Australian Capital Territory. The premier representative competition is the annual Rugby league State of Origin featuring two sides, the New South Wales Blues and the Queensland Maroons is often referred to as "Australian sport's greatest rivalry", it is one of Australia's premier sporting events, attracting huge interest and television audiences.

Australia has a rich history of rugby league, first taking up the sport in 1908, it has been dominant over the other rugby league-playing nations for many years, but enjoys a strong rivalry with New Zealand.

Commonly known as "league" or "football", and sometimes referred to as "the greatest game of all", it is traditionally seen as a "working man's sport" with its roots in the working class communities of Northern England, compared to rugby union which has its roots in prestigious English public schools.

The National Rugby League Hall of Fame names the greatest Australian players of all time, with 14 declared Immortals, all male, of which eight are from New South Wales and four are from Queensland and include: Clive Churchill, Bob Fulton, Reg Gasnier, Johnny Raper, Graeme Langlands, Wally Lewis, Arthur Beetson, Andrew Johns, Dave Brown, Frank Burge, Mal Meninga, Dally Messenger, Norm Provan and Ron Coote.

== History ==
=== 20th century ===
The formation of the new "Northern Union game" was followed in rugby union circles in Australia, and as early as the 1899 football season Sydney's Wallaroo FC player Stephen Spragg was offered a contract by the Bradford club to move to England.

By the time the "Northern Union game" arrived in Australia it was fundamentally different from that of Rugby Union, with lineouts, rucks and two players from each team having already been removed, and the play-the-ball introduced to improve the game's flow.

A similar schism to that which occurred in England, and for similar reasons, opened up in the rugby union establishment of Australia, seeing the term "rugby league" first used for the new game as in the rest of the world, in 1907 at the instigation of the famous test cricketer Victor Trumper. At a meeting in Bateman's Crystal Hotel in Sydney, New South Wales, the New South Wales Rugby Football League (NSWRFL) was formed as a professional organisation. Players were immediately recruited for the new game, and despite the threat of immediate and lifetime expulsion from the rugby union, the NSWRFL managed to recruit Herbert "Dally" Messenger, the most famous rugby footballer in Sydney at that time. The visit by James Giltinan, Harry Hoyle, and Victor Trumper on Sunday 11 August 1907 to gain the agreement of Dally Messenger's mother, Annie Messenger, for him to switch to the new code is part of Rugby League folklore.

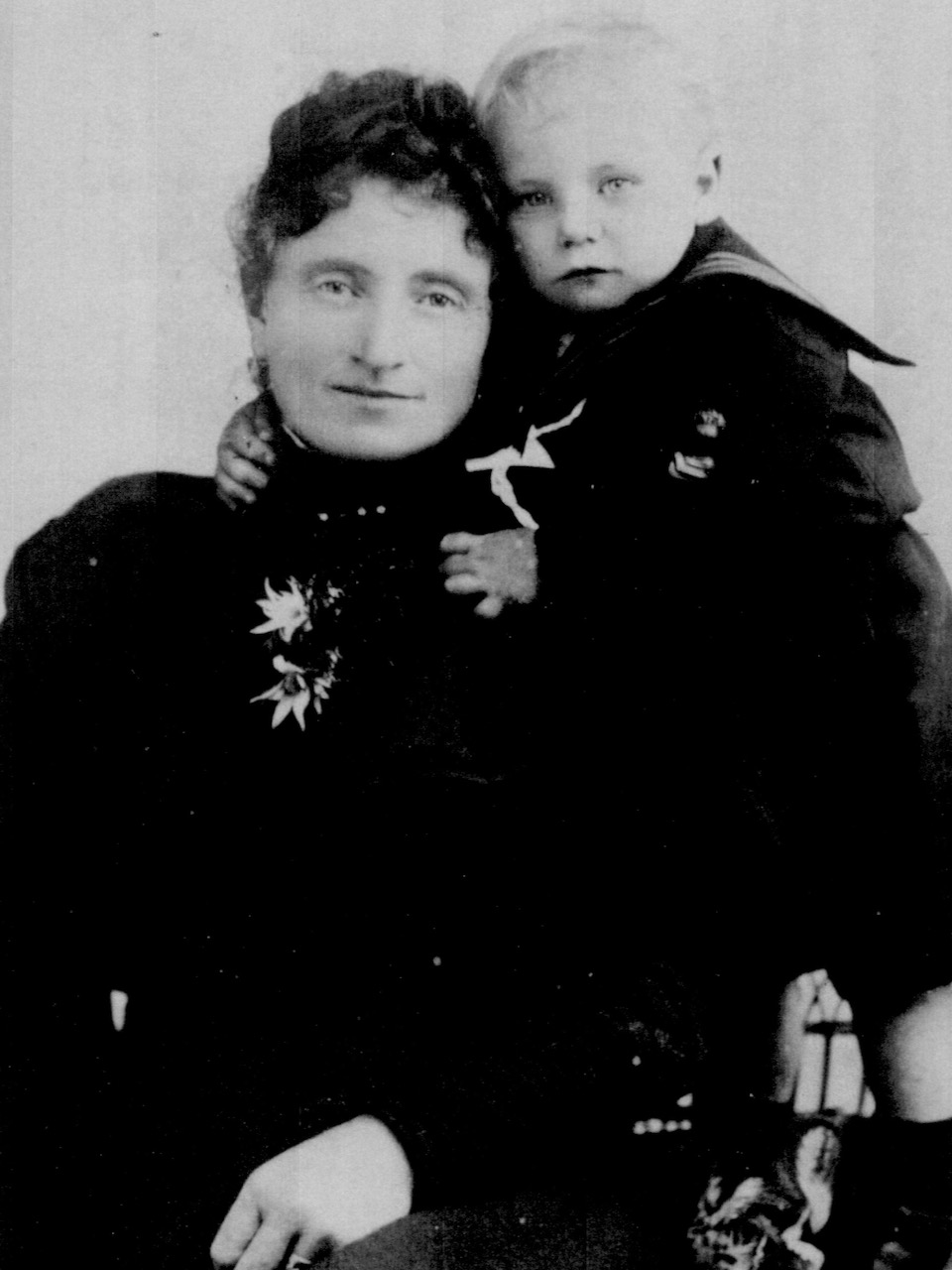
Annie Frances Messenger (née Atkinson) mother of Rugby League Champion, Dally Messenger

Rugby league then went on to displace rugby union as the primary football code in New South Wales. Four matches were played in Sydney on the New South Wales Rugby Football League's "Foundation Day" on 20 April 1908 (Easter Monday) in two double headers. At Wentworth Park in Sydney's Glebe, Easts beat Newtown before Glebe triumphed over Newcastle while at Birchgrove Oval in Balmain, South Sydney beat North Sydney and Balmain beat Wests. On 8 May 1909 the first match of rugby league was played in Brisbane. Past Grammars played against Souths before a handful of spectators at the Gabba.

The Newcastle Rugby League was founded in 1910 with four clubs, Central Newcastle, Northern Suburbs, South Newcastle and Western Suburbs. The Illawarra Rugby League was founded in 1911 with five clubs (Dapto, Helensburgh, Mount Keira, Unanderra and Wollongong). In 1911, a Goldfields' League was formed in West Wyalong, and games were played in Tamworth, Aberdeen, and along the South Coast. The game was introduced to Orange in 1912 and spread quickly through the western districts. In 1913 branch leagues were formed at Bathurst, Dubbo, Nowra, and Tamworth. In 1914 and 1915 an amalgamation of rugby league and Australian rules football was considered and trialled.

In May of 1911 the only soccer-style "field goal" ever kicked in the Sydney first grade competition was made by John 'Dinny' Campbell of Eastern Suburbs. This mode of scoring was outlawed in 1951. The 1920 Great Britain Lions tour saw a record attendance for any sport at the Sydney Cricket Ground as Australia won the Ashes for the first time on home soil. In 1921 approximately 30,000 people watched a women's rugby league game in Sydney. This set a long-standing record for the highest attendance at a women's sporting competition outside the Olympic or Commonwealth games.The attendance record for a rugby league match in Australia was broken in 1932 when 70,204 people saw Australia play England at the Sydney Cricket Ground.

The 50th anniversary of rugby league in Australia was marked by hosting the second ever Rugby League World Cup tournament in 1957.

The attendance record for a rugby league match was re-set by the 1965 NSWRFL season's Grand Final between St. George and South Sydney attracting a crowd of 78,065. The 1967 NSWRFL season's grand final became the first football grand final of any code to be televised live in Australia. The Nine Network had paid $5,000 for the broadcasting rights.

Arthur Beetson became the first indigenous Australian to captain the national team of any sport when in 1973 he was selected to lead the Kangaroos. Also that year NSWRFL boss Kevin Humphreys negotiated rugby league's first television deal with the Australian Broadcasting Corporation. In 1976 Eastern Suburbs became the first rugby league team, and one of the first in Australian sport, to sport a sponsor's name on their jersey.

The NSWRFL Premiership spread outside Sydney in 1982 with the introduction of the Illawarra Steelers and Canberra Raiders. In 1986, Brisbane Rugby League player Bob Lindner was the last to be selected from a non-NSWRL club to debut for the Australian national team. 1987 was the last year that a state of Origin player was selected from a non-NSWRL club. In 1988 the NSWRL's first teams from outside the borders of New South Wales were added: the Brisbane Broncos and Gold Coast Giants.

In 1993 the Australian Women's Rugby League was formed. The 1993 Winfield Cup Grand Final drew remarkably strong ratings nationwide. The second game of the 1994 State of Origin series was brought south to the Melbourne Cricket Ground and re-set the nation's rugby league attendance record with 87,161. This success had set the scene for a truly national competition which eventuated in 1995 with the addition of teams from Townsville, Perth and even Auckland in New Zealand. However the growth of the competition was severely hampered by one of the biggest corporate disputes in Australian history over control of it: the Super League war. The Super League war was fought in and out of court during the mid-1990s by the News Ltd-backed Super League and Kerry Packer-backed Australian Rugby League organisations over control of the top-level professional rugby league football competition of Australasia. In 1995, New South Wales State of Origin and Kangaroos Test forward Ian Roberts became the first high-profile Australian sports person and first footballer in the world to come out to the public as gay. 1997 was unique in Australian rugby league's history as it was split into two separate competitions: the 1997 ARL season and the 1997 Super League season. The following season the premiership was re-united under the National Rugby League partnership committee, composed of representatives from Australian Rugby League and News Ltd.

=== 21st century ===
In 2008, the centenary year of rugby league in Australia was celebrated, with 2008 World Cup being held and the Royal Australian Mint launching a series of uncirculated coins in November 2007 to commemorate the occasion. The percentage of indigenous players in top-level rugby league premiership was reported to have fallen from 21% in the 1990s to 11% in 2009. In 2009, rugby league's popularity in Australia was confirmed as it had the highest television ratings of any sport. This occurred again in 2010, with an increased number of people watching Rugby League (120 million) compared to AFL (112 million). This is a season when an unprecedented scandal took place: the Melbourne Storm was found to have conducted four systematic breaches of the competition's salary cap, and had all honours gained over the previous years (including 2 premierships) nullified, were forced to pay large fines and shed enough star players to get back under the cap, all while playing the rest of the season already guaranteed the wooden spoon.

2012 saw a major re-structure of the administration of rugby league in Australia. The newly formed independent Australian Rugby League Commission took over control of the National Rugby League premiership, the State of Origin series and the Australian national team.

A 2013 report found that behind cricket, rugby league was Australia's second-most popular sport. The same year a report conducted by Brand Finance valued the Penrith Panthers club at $46.2m, the highest of any Australian sporting brand, while the Brisbane Broncos had the highest brand equity.

Polling conducted by Roy Morgan Research indicated that in 2014 the NRL was second only to the AFL in terms of football television viewship. In 2018, the NRL superseded the AFL's television viewership by over five million viewers.

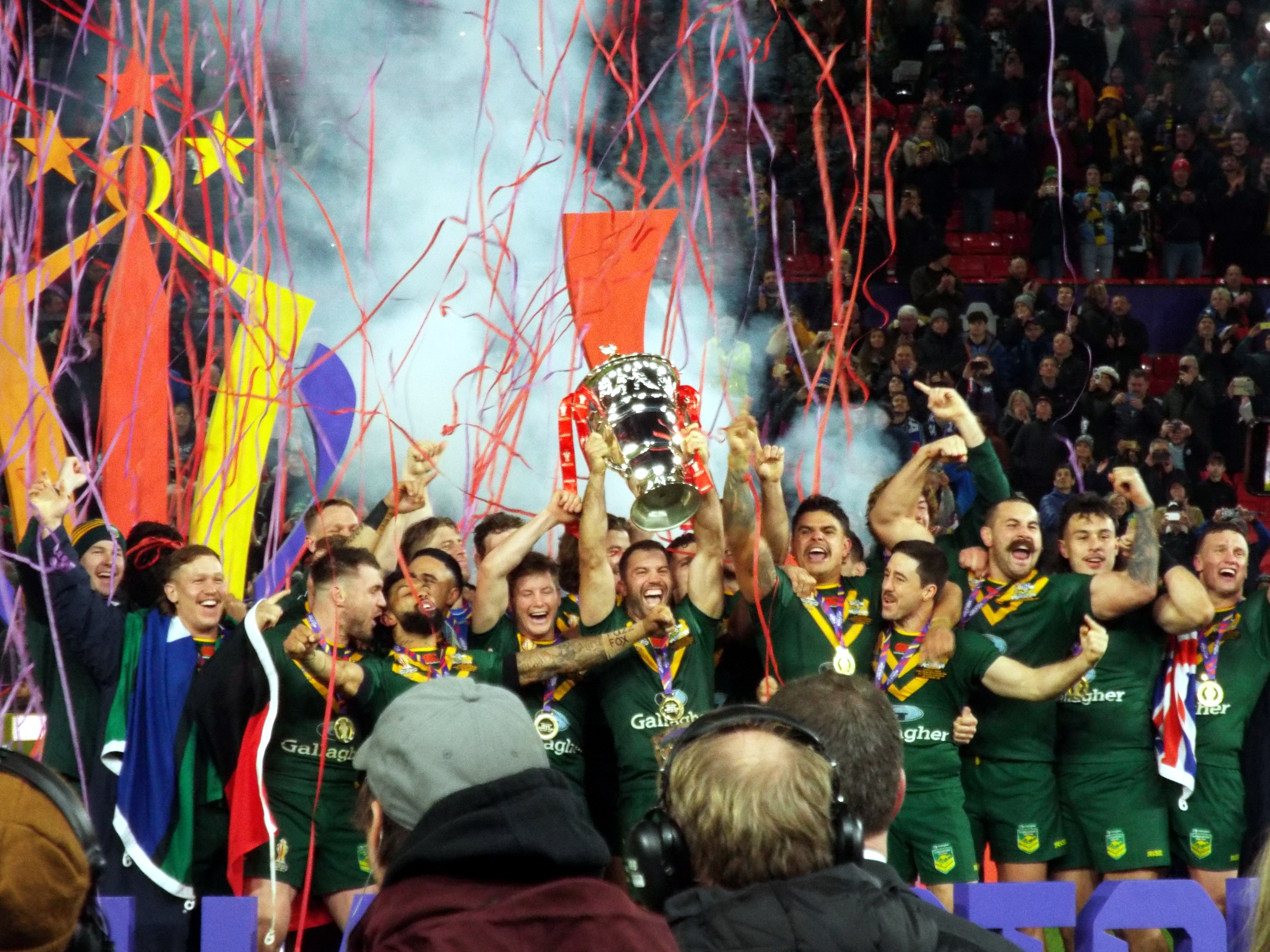
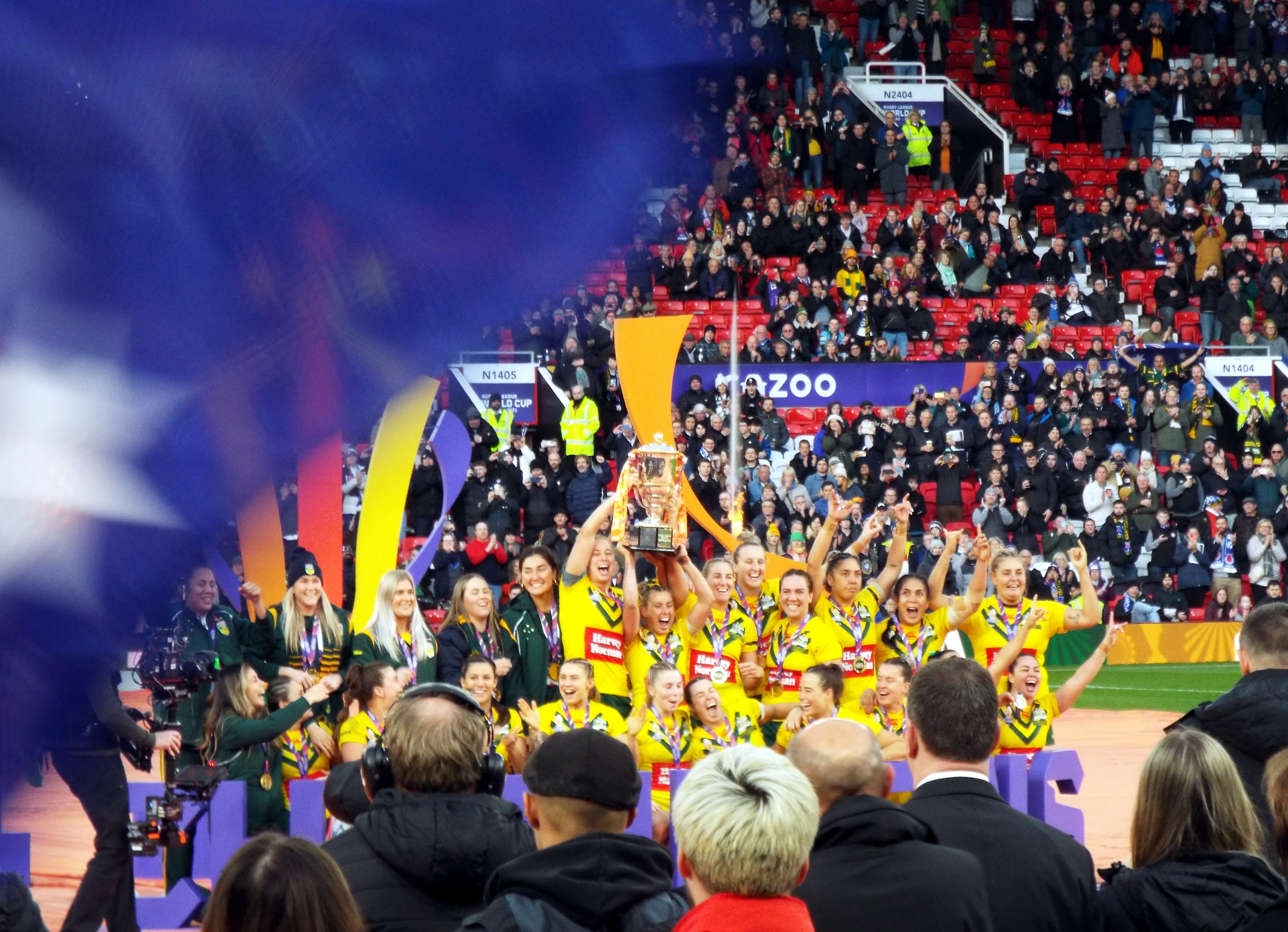
Kangaroos (top) and Jillaroos (bottom) lift their respective 2021 Rugby League World Cup trophies.

== Governing body ==
=== Federal governing body ===
The Australian Rugby League Commission is the governing body for the sport of rugby league in Australia and also conducts all representative rugby league, including the national team and the annual State of Origin series. The Australian Rugby League's major club competition is the National Rugby League.

=== State based governing bodies ===
At state level, the game is administered by local governing bodies under the control of the ARLC. The state bodies include the New South Wales Rugby League and Queensland Rugby League, as well as Northern Territory Rugby League, South Australian Rugby League, Tasmanian Rugby League, Victorian Rugby League and Western Australia Rugby League which have Affiliate state status.

New South Wales has a second governing body, the New South Wales Country Rugby League (NSWCRL) to govern the sport outside the Sydney metropolitan area. In spite of its name, NSWCRL also governs rugby league in the Australian Capital Territory. However, the NSWRL absorbed the CRL in 2019.

== Club competitions ==
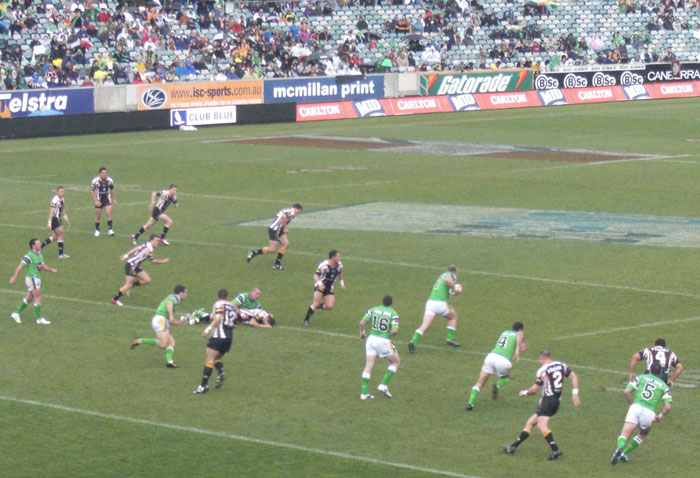
Wests Tigers vs Canberra Raiders, 2006

The elite professional rugby league club competition in Australia is the National Rugby League (NRL). The NRL's Telstra Premiership is contested by 4 teams from Queensland, 10 from New South Wales, 1 from Victoria and 1 from the Australian Capital Territory as well as 1 team from New Zealand. Formerly, 16 of these teams also fielded National Youth Competition teams, an Under 20s competition that ceased in 2017. This was replaced by the Jersey Flegg Cup and the Hastings Deering Colts, locally-administrated state-based competitions for New South Wales and Queensland respectively.

Underneath the NRL, semi-professional competitions such as the Hostplus Cup, Knock-On Effect NSW Cup and Ron Massey Cup are run in both New South Wales and Queensland. These competitions are the major feeder competitions for the NRL competition. Alongside these mainly metropolitan-based competitions country rugby league bodies run competitions throughout rural Queensland and New South Wales. Amateur competitions are run in the Affiliated states.

=== Domestic structure ===
Australian rugby league system
- Country: Australia
- Sport: Rugby league
- Promotion and relegation: No

National system
- Federation: Australian Rugby League Commission
- Confederation: Asia-Pacific Rugby League
- Top division: National Rugby League
- Second division: State competitions: New South Wales Cup; Queensland Cup; Melbourne Rugby League; NRL South Australia; NRL Western Australia
- Cup competition: World Club Challenge (international)

Regional systems
- Top divisions: New South Wales Cup; Queensland Cup; Melbourne Rugby League; NRL Tasmania; NRL South Australia; NRL Western Australia

Tier	League													
1 (National)	(Australia) National Rugby League; 17 clubs (10 (New South Wales) , 4 (Queensland) , 1 (Victoria (state)) , 1 (Australian Capital Territory) , 1 (New Zealand) )													
2 (State)	New South Wales Cup; 13 clubs (11, 1 (Australian Capital Territory) , 1 (New Zealand) )								Queensland Cup; 15 clubs (13, 1 (New South Wales) , 1 (Papua New Guinea) )			(Victoria (state)) Melbourne Rugby League; 17 clubs (All (Victoria (state)) )	(South Australia) NRL South Australia; 5 clubs (All (South Australia) )	(Western Australia) NRL Western Australia; 6 clubs (All (Western Australia) )
3 (Regional)	Sydney (Inc. 1 (Fiji) )	North Coast	Greater Northern	Riverina and Monaro	Western	Greater Southern	Newcastle	Central Coast	Central	North	South East	Sunraysia-Riverlands	Limestone Coast	Pilbara

=== Attendances ===
Rugby league attendances saw their previously best year in 1995 (the year before Australia's Super League War, with total attendances reaching 3,061,893. Six clubs averaged over 20,000 in that year, a feat still unmatched. This was a large increase on the previous years and was no doubt due to the formation of several new clubs and the renaming of the competition, from the New South Wales Rugby League (NSWRL) to the Australian Rugby league (ARL).

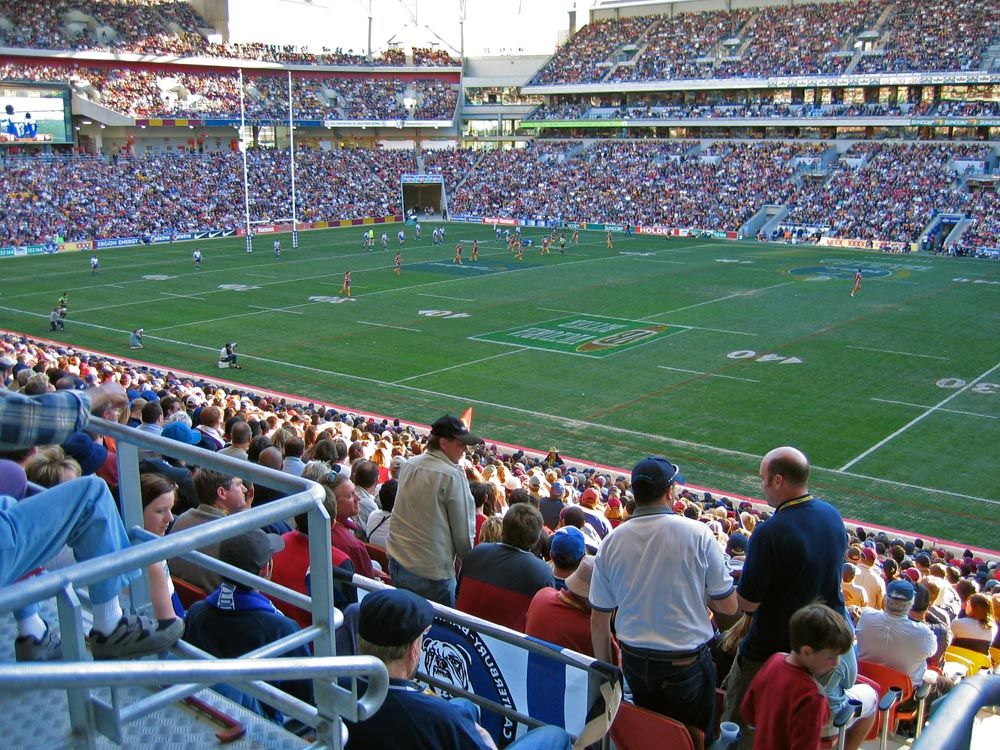
A 2004 match between Brisbane Broncos and Canterbury Bulldogs in Brisbane

The year of 1996 was a turbulent one for Australian rugby league and saw what may be the largest decrease in attendance ever (2,450,776, down 611,117 down from 1995) in the ARL. This crowd decrease is attributed to the poor publicity surrounding the ongoing court cases related to the Super League War. When the Super League competition was introduced in 1997 and played alongside the ARL competition it attracted 1,111,189. The ARL for the same year saw slightly higher attendances of 1,308,824. Subsequent years of 1998, in which the merger of the SL and ARL formed the National Rugby League (NRL) and 1999 also saw increases.

The year 2000 saw club mergers and "relegations" from the NRL. The effective slashing of clubs from the first grade rugby league competition was reflected in the slashing of crowd figures as fans became disgruntled by the club they had supported for many years being torn apart.

Crowd figures did not improve until 2003, with an increase of 249,317 on the previous year, 2002. Figures increased again in 2004 and 2005. The aggregate crowd for 2005 was 2,964,288 and the average crowd figure for regular season matches was 16,468, the highest ever recorded, and 34,710 for play-offs. In 2006, attendance slightly dipped to 2,808,235. An average of 15,601 for regular season matches and 34,163 for playoffs, which was still an improvement on 2004 figures.

In 2007, the number of teams competing in first grade rugby league in Australia increased for the first time since 2002 with the re-introduction of the Gold Coast Titans in Gold Coast, Queensland.(Statistics do not include finals)

In 2010 Rugby League recorded its best year ever in Australia, setting a new all-time total season attendance record of 3,490,778 spectators — and with four less teams than in 1995.

==== 2025 ====
In the 2025 league season, seven NRL clubs recorded an average home league attendance of at least 20,000:

#	Club	Average
1	Brisbane Broncos	41,185
2	Canterbury-Bankstown Bulldogs	30,688
3	Eastern Suburbs	25,846
4	New Zealand Warriors¹	25,382
5	Melbourne Storm	23,959
6	Dolphins	21,820
7	Newcastle Knights	20,884

¹ From New Zealand

== Representative competitions ==
The State of Origin series is an annual best-of-three series of interstate matches between the two strongest rugby league states Queensland and New South Wales. The State of Origin series is one of Australia's premier sporting events, attracting a huge television audience and usually selling out the stadiums in which the games are played. From 2012–2021, an Under 20s State of Origin match was held annually on the same weekend as the Australia vs New Zealand test. This has now been changed to Under 19s.

Women's State of Origin has been held since 1999, and in 2021 an Under 19s Women's series was introduced.

City vs Country Origin is an annual Australian rugby league match that takes place in New South Wales between teams made up of NRL players representing 'City' (Sydney metropolitan area) and 'Country' (all areas in NSW outside the Sydney metropolitan area).

The Affiliated States Championship is an annual competition involving four affiliated states (Victoria, South Australia, Northern Territory, Tasmania, and Western Australia) plus representative sides from the Australian Police and Australian Defence Force.

== Demographics of the game ==
=== Total participation ===
In an interview for a Sydney Morning Herald article in 2021, Chairman of the Australian Rugby League Commission, Peter V'landys, revealed yearly rugby league participation figures from 2015 to 2021. These participation figures show that national participation in 2019 (the last year before COVID-19 disruption) for males was 147,723 of whom 83,400 were located in New South Wales. National participation figures in 2019 for females was 14,958 with 7,108 were located in New South Wales. By the time of the article in 2021, national participation figures for males had declined to 143,792 while national participation for females had increased to 16,899.

In 2021, a total of 30,648 students in metropolitan, regional and remote Australia from 354 schools participated in rugby league. The NRL 2008 Annual report included significantly higher school participation figures suggesting either a substantial decline of 89% or a more generous definition was applied when measuring participants historically.

Region/State/Territory	Overview	Adult players 2016	Adult players 2022/23	Adult players 2023/24
New South Wales	Overview	84,763	83,485	83,474
(Victoria (state)) Victoria	Overview	10,046	10,471	12,280
Queensland	Overview	69,042	69,331	63,628
Western Australia	Overview	8,484	8,864	5,443
South Australia	Overview	944	2,879	2,207
Tasmania	Overview	0	10	0
Australian Capital Territory	Overview	1,617	1,743	3,637
Northern Territory	Overview	2,095	3,866	3,674
National total		176,991	180,600	174,343

=== Women in rugby league ===
According to Ausplay in 2024, 45% of adult players are now female. In two decades this has changed from 2004 when the vast majority were male and just 5% were female. However at junior level, the game is still predominantly male, less than a third of players under 15 are female.

National participation figures released in 2021 show female participants number 16,899 accounting for 10.52% of the total national participation number of 160,691.

The Australian Women's Rugby League was formed in 1993, which only achieved affiliation with the Australian Rugby League in 1998. This is in contrast to the men's competition which has existed since 1908.

The lack of female-participation in Australian rugby league can mostly be attributed to the predominantly masculine culture which discourages women from playing, and provides little financial or cultural incentive to play.

Despite this, a women's rugby league match in Sydney in 1921 attracted around 30,000 spectators.

Females account for a large percentage of rugby league's viewing public and the attraction of the game for women partly accounts for rugby league's very strong position in the Australian sporting landscape. Many NRL clubs hold initiatives to foster this relationship. For instance, in 2005 the Canterbury Bulldogs staged a luncheon for 300 of Sydney's corporate women to raise funds for the National Breast Cancer Foundation, as well as skills development for school girls within the Canterbury-Bankstown district. This follows the increased number of female members to the boards of the National Rugby League and several of its clubs. Manly Sea Eagles also instituted several female directed initiatives, some of which were aimed towards further increasing female spectator numbers.

Not all the perceptions of rugby league being a mostly man game are completely true. At a junior and local level there are many women involved in volunteering positions. Women form a very important part of the local club structures. However, it is not customary for women over the age of 11 to continue playing rugby league against the boys and the exclusively women's rugby league clubs have a relatively small profile in comparison to the local boys' clubs.

Rugby league became the first mainstream professional sport in Australia to appoint a female director to a governing body, with Katie Page, the managing director of retail giant Harvey Norman, accepting an invitation to join the National Rugby League's executive board.

In 2009 the Australian National Women's rugby league side (Jillaroos) defeated the 2008 Women's Rugby League World Champions New Zealand, in Auckland, ending a ten-year streak of successive defeats at the hands of the New Zealand team.

=== Age ===
==== Junior participation ====
An analysis of 2001 New South Wales Child Health Survey by the University of New South Wales has shown that 23.2% of parents are likely to discourage their son from playing rugby league. In contrast, the next most discouraged sport was rugby union, with only 7.5% of parents willing to discourage the sport. This is despite recent research by Medibank annually since 2003 that puts other sports in Australia, such as Australian Rules Football and soccer as producing more major injuries.

The injury rates and the public perception of rugby league as a dangerous sport are most likely the catalysts for the introduction of several initiatives by the national rugby league and ARL development in recent years to curb the number of youth playing other sports. The specific initiatives over the years includes a Safe play code, Kids to kangaroos programs and new forms of modified rugby league, such as, Mod league and Mini Footy to help young children prepare for the full rigours of the international code. Also with such introductions are the competitions aimed at school children such as Joey league, League of legends and League Sevens, which use modified rugby league rules such as Tag and Sevens.

Whilst previous announcements in annual reports have claimed junior registrations as high as 120,667 and up to 1,000,000 children engaged in "rugby-league based physical activities in 2008" (which would equate to roughly 1/3 of all primary and secondary children nationwide in that year), more recent reports have identified far lower participation numbers of 160,691 total registrations and 30,648 students nationwide.

==== Senior participation ====
In 2008, 51,540 people participated in senior rugby league. Participation numbers amongst senior divisions tend to decline in higher age groups. While this can be expected to the nature of a physical sport, overall rugby league senior numbers have declined since the early 1990s. The ARL attributes this to game becoming more physically demanding and the increasing pressure to sustain semi-professional clubs and teams. At the same time, however, it notes that "rugby league is, generally, missing a recreational game that keeps people playing the sport when they drop out of the so-called elite stream". To combat this, the ARL is investing programs, modified rules and gala days to increase senior participation such as the ARL Masters Carnival.

=== Location ===
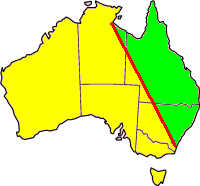
The Barassi Line splits Australia in two, with Rugby League considered to be more popular East of the line and Australian rules football considered to be more popular to the West.

Rugby league is by far the largest and most popular sport in New South Wales, Queensland and the Australian Capital Territory (which constitute 55% of the population of Australia). In these states, NRL viewership figures far outweigh those of any other sport, and crowd figures are ahead of those of Cricket and the Australian rules football, the next largest sports in terms of attendance.

New South Wales and Queensland account for the majority of rugby league participation numbers. However, per capita figures show that Queensland and the Northern Territory rate ahead of New South Wales participation figures, making Queensland and the Northern Territory the largest participators per capita of rugby league in Australia.

Rugby league enjoys lower participation in other states of Australia due to competition with Australia's other major football code Australian rules football, and the high junior level participation rates of other sports such as soccer and basketball. Victoria and Western Australia have roughly an equal number of participants with Western Australia higher per capita. The establishment of the Melbourne Storm has seen Victoria experience growth in player counts, especially in school based rugby league participation which registered 9,023 participants in 2022. South Australia has the lowest participation levels for mainland Australia and Tasmania has, by far, the least participants for rugby league in the entire nation.

== Variants ==
Three main variant sports of rugby league are played in Australia; Touch, OzTag, and League tag. As can be seen above, total rugby league participation including Variants is well over 1.5 million (1 million touch alone).

=== Touch ===
Touch (also known as touch football or touch rugby) is a variant of rugby league that is conducted under the direction of the Federation of International Touch (FIT). Although it shares similarities and history with rugby league, it is recognised as a sport in its own right due to its differences which have been developed over the sport's lifetime.

Touch is a variation of rugby league with the tackling of opposing players replaced by a touch. As touches must be made with minimal force, touch is therefore considered a limited-contact sport. The original basic rules of touch were established in the 1960s by members of the South Sydney Junior Rugby League Club in Sydney, Australia.

The sport is governed in Australia by Touch Football Australia in partnership with the NRL, and is played by over 1 million people nationwide. Top level competitions include the NRL Touch Premiership and the National Touch League.

=== OzTag ===
OzTag is a non-contact form of rugby league, and can be seen as a variation of British tag rugby. Cronulla Sharks and St George Dragons halfback Perry Haddock introduced the sport in Australia while coaching the 1992 St George Jersey Flegg side. Together with Chris Parkes, the two took the sport to fields across Australia. Today, it is played by over 200,000 players in organised leagues across the country.

=== League Tag ===
League Tag replaces tackling with the removal of one of two tags carried on an opponent's hips, attached directly to specific League Tag shorts with Velcro patches, but otherwise retains almost all other rules of traditional rugby league (such as kicking). A number of additional rules are also added relating to the specific issues associated with a tag based game.

League Tag is the primary female version of rugby league administered by the Country Rugby League. The NSWRL continues to administer the game across the state post the NSWRL-CRL merger in 2019.

== The national team ==
The Australia national rugby league team has been nicknamed the Kangaroos since 1994. Prior to that the Australia team was only known as the Kangaroos when on tours of Great Britain and/or France. They are administered by the Australian Rugby League and have been the most dominant national side since the 1960s.

== In popular culture ==
Rugby league has been described as "an iconic Australian sport" and has therefore featured prominently in Australian popular culture. Famous Australian writers throughout history such as Banjo Paterson, Thomas Keneally and Kenneth Slessor have produced literature about the game.

== Media coverage ==
Due to the widespread interest in rugby league games played, including the State of Origin series, match results, scorelines and reports of injuries to key players, are comprehensively carried by many Australian newspapers. These include the major national daily newspapers; in general match results and reports are published on the weekend of the game and on Mondays, and commentary continues throughout the week, with rugby league-related stories usually to be found in the sporting section of the major newspapers every week-day.

All premiership games are broadcast on television, either free-to-air or cable. Online, the ABC, as well as major newsgroups provide articles on Rugby League, bylined in general by a reporter who is exclusively a sports correspondent. Interest in rugby league is highest in New South Wales and Queensland; as well, many of the large number of Australian expatriates living and working overseas are avidly interested in the season's games, and are able to ensure that they are kept up-to-date by accessing on-line versions of stories provided by major media organisations. Formerly, the official publication for the NRL was Big League, however, production was suspended in 2020 due to the effects of the COVID-19 pandemic in Australia, and hasn't been renewed since.

The 2012 State of Origin series' third and deciding game set a new record for the highest television audience in Australia for a rugby league match since the introduction of the OzTam ratings system in 2001.

A list of major newspapers which publish rugby league-related stories includes The Australian, The Courier-Mail, Daily Telegraph, The Sydney Morning Herald, Herald Sun and The Age. Matches are broadcast on both Channel 9, Foxtel and in New Zealand by Sky TV.

ABC radio's Grandstand program broadcasts live rugby league games on the weekends. Sydney radio station, 2GB, also broadcasts live NRL matches Friday to Sunday (with their Continuous Call Team).

Rugby league was the biggest television sport in Australia in 2022.

== See also ==
- Rugby league in England
- Sport in Australia
- Rugby League Competitions in Australia
- Australian Rugby League Hall of Fame
- List of Australian rugby league stadiums by capacity
