= State league =

A state league is a level of competition in Australian sport directly below that of a national league. Most of these competitions are based in a single state or territory, and from this the term originates. State leagues are generally semi-professional and of a lower playing standard compared to national leagues. Several state leagues act as quasi-reserves competitions for teams that also compete in national leagues, while others are entirely separated from their national counterparts.

== History ==
The Australian federation consists of six states and two territories. Historically, the highest level of club-based sports were the various leagues based in each state and territory. The change to national leagues began in 1977 when the National Soccer League was formed with clubs in most capital cities. Australian football and rugby leagues followed suit during the 1980s when the Victorian and New South Welsh leagues began to admit clubs from other states.

== State leagues by sport ==
=== Association football (soccer) ===
The state league system in men's association football (soccer) is generally underpinned by the National Premier Leagues (NPL), which administers individual competitions in eight state-based member federations. Each of the state league competitions represent the second tier in the Australian soccer league system. Following the imminent introduction of the National Second Division in 2024, the premier NPL competitions will shift down to level 3 in the system. The term 'state league' is also used as a divisional name in several member federations' lower-tier competitions.

In women's soccer, the state league system is largely operated by National Premier Leagues Women's, which currently consists of seven state-based member federations.

State leagues in association football (soccer)
State or territory	Men's state league	Women's state league
Australian Capital Territory	NPL Men's Capital Football	NPL Women's Capital Football
New South Wales	NPL NSW Men's	NPL NSW Women's
New South Wales	NPL Men's Northern NSW	NPL Women's Northern NSW
Northern Territory	—N/a	Women's Premier League
Queensland	NPL Queensland Men's	NPL Queensland Women's
South Australia	NPL South Australia Men's	Women's NPL South Australia
Tasmania	NPL Tasmania	Women's Super League
Victoria	NPL Victoria Men's	NPL Women's Victoria
Western Australia	NPL Western Australia Men	NPL Western Australia Women

=== Australian rules football ===
State leagues in Australian rules football
State or territory	Men's state league	Women's state league
Australian Capital Territory	AFL Canberra Men	AFL Canberra Women
New South Wales	Sydney Football League	SFL Women's
Northern Territory	Northern Territory Football League	Women's Premier League
Queensland	Queensland Australian Football League	QAFL Women's
South Australia	South Australian National Football League	SANFL Women's League
Tasmania	Tasmanian State League	—N/a
Victoria	Victorian Football League	VFL Women's
Western Australia	West Australian Football League	WAFL Women's

=== Rugby league ===
State leagues in rugby league
State or territory	Men's state league	Women's state league
Australian Capital Territory	Canberra Raiders Cup	Katrina Fanning Shield
New South Wales	NSW Cup	NSWRL Women's Premiership
Northern Territory	NRL NT Men's	NRL NT Women's
Queensland	Queensland Cup	QRL Women's Premiership
South Australia	NRL SA Metro	NRL SA Women's
Tasmania	—N/a	—N/a
Victoria	Storm Premiership Men's	Storm Premiership Women's
Western Australia	NRL WA Premiership	NRL WA Women's Premiership

=== Rugby union ===
State leagues in rugby union
State or territory	Men's state league	Women's state league
Australian Capital Territory	John I Dent Cup	Premier Women's 15s
New South Wales	Shute Shield	—N/a
Northern Territory	—N/a	—N/a
Queensland	Hospital Challenge Cup	Women's Premier Rugby
South Australia	Rugby Union SA Premier Grade	Rugby Union SA Women's Grade
Tasmania	—N/a	—N/a
Victoria	Dewar Shield	Lindroth Cup
Western Australia	RugbyWA Premier Grade	RugbyWA Women's Premier Grade

=== Netball ===
State leagues in women's netball form the third tier of competition in Australia, below the elite Super Netball and the second-tier Australian Netball Championships (ANC). However, unlike the ANC – which has been reduced to a week-long series of matches held largely between Super Netball reserves and academy sides – state league netball competitions operate throughout the winter months and provide consistent pathways to players aiming to reach a higher level in the sport.

While men's netball is growing in popularity, the sport is yet to establish a strong history of state league competitions. Half of the current men's state leagues are branded under the M-League name and are operated by the various state-based men's and mixed netball associations.

State leagues in netball
State or territory	Men's state league	Women's state league
Australian Capital Territory	Netball ACT State League Men's League	Netball ACT State League
New South Wales	Netball NSW Men's Metro League	Netball NSW Premier League
Northern Territory	—N/a	—N/a
Queensland	QLD M-League Men's	Sapphire Series
South Australia	SA M-League Men's	Netball SA Premier League
Tasmania	—N/a	Tasmanian Netball League
Victoria	VIC M-League Men's	Victorian Netball League
Western Australia	West Australian Netball League Men's	West Australian Netball League

=== Cricket ===
State leagues in cricket are traditionally referred to as grade cricket, with most state-based organisations now operating competitions under the Premier Cricket name following a move by Cricket Australia in 2016 to standardise branding. These leagues form the third tier of Australian cricket, below the elite Sheffield Shield and Women's National Cricket League for men and women respectively, and the second-tier Second XI competition for men.

State or territory	Men's state league	Women's state league
Australian Capital Territory	ACT Premier Cricket Men's	ACT Premier Cricket Women's
New South Wales	NSW Premier Cricket Men's	NSW Premier Cricket Women's
Northern Territory	—N/a	—N/a
Queensland	Queensland Premier Cricket Men's	Queensland Premier Cricket Women's
South Australia	South Australian Premier Cricket Men's	South Australian Premier Cricket Men's
Tasmania	Cricket Tasmania Premier League Men's	Cricket Tasmania Premier League Women's
Victoria	Victorian Premier Cricket Men's	Victorian Premier Cricket Women's
Western Australia	Western Australian Premier Cricket Men's	Western Australian Female Premier Cricket

=== Tennis ===
State leagues in tennis in Australia are operated by the governing tennis organisation for that state. These leagues provide an opportunity for local and international tennis players to play quality matches. Most Australian pro players begin their careers playing in their respective state league competitions. These leagues represent the highest level of inter-club tennis competition within their respective regions.

State or territory	Men's state league	Women's state league
Australian Capital Territory	—	
New South Wales	New South Wales Premier League	
Northern Territory	—	—
Queensland	Queensland State Leagues	
South Australia	Tennis SA State League Men's	Tennis SA State League Women's
Tasmania	—	—
Victoria	Tennis Victoria League Championships	
Western Australia	Tennis West Men's State League	Tennis West Women's State League
