= Rugby league in South Australia =

- Governing body: NRL South Australia
- First played: 1947, Adelaide, South Australia
- Registered players: 2,207; 12,000+ (including variants)

Audience records
- Single match: 48,613 (2023 State of Origin series)

In South Australia, Rugby league has been played at amateur level since the 1940s. The governing body is NRL South Australia.

South Australia was once home to a professional club, the Adelaide Rams from 1997 to 1998.

== History ==
The first instance of rugby league being played in South Australia occurred during the 1914 Great Britain Lions tour of Australia and New Zealand, when the touring Lions beat South Australia 101–0 at Hawthorn Oval in front of 2,500 spectators.

Current rugby league activity in the state traces its roots in the state back to the 1940s, when the Port Adelaide rugby union team split, and defected to rugby league. The first competition began in 1947 with five clubs. South Sydney played a South Australian team in 1945 beating them 45–10.

Big time rugby league came to South Australia on 28 June 1991 when the St George Dragons defeated the Balmain Tigers in front of 28,884 fans at the Adelaide Oval for their Round 14 match of the 1991 NSWRL season. This would be the first of five consecutive years the Dragons (sponsored by South Australian wine company Penfolds) would play one home game per season at the Adelaide Oval. The attendance also stood as the NSWRL's largest minor round attendance of the 1991 season.

South Australia's only professional rugby league team, the Adelaide Rams, had a short but eventful existence. Originally the Australian Rugby League (ARL) planned to relocate one of the struggling Sydney teams to Adelaide, but the Super League war and the SARL's decision to align themselves with the News Ltd financed Super League in 1995 killed off the ARL's want for a team in Adelaide, and the ARL turned its attention back to Melbourne instead. Later in 1995, with Super League still only consisting of nine teams and the Victorian Rugby League still aligned with the ARL, a decision was made to give Adelaide the 10th Super League licence.

In 1995 the ARL won their Supreme Court battle with Super League which stopped the rebel competition from starting its first season in 1996. This proved only temporary however as the decision was overturned on appeal and Super League would begin their new competition in 1997 with the Adelaide Rams one of the teams to be playing.

Brought into existence for the 1997 Super League season, the Rams had instant success, attracting 27,435 to their first home game at the Adelaide Oval against fellow newcomers the Hunter Mariners (the Mariners based in Newcastle, NSW). Results however would prove elusive for the new club who finished their inaugural season in 9th place, though they did enjoy some success against stronger clubs, with wins over the Auckland Warriors (away), eventual Grand Finalists Cronulla (away), and the Penrith Panthers in their final home game of the year.

In 1998 they were selected to join the 20-team National Rugby League, however rumours abounded that they were to axed from the 1999 season as part of the rationalisation of teams (from 20 to 16) in the competition. Crowd numbers fell away in 1998 as on-field results continued to elude the team, and a dispute over playing at the Adelaide Oval saw the Rams move to Hindmarsh Stadium for the final four rounds of the season. Poor on field results also resulted in inaugural head coach Rod Reddy being sacked halfway through the season and replaced by Dean Lance. The Rams finished what was their final season in 17th place with a 7–17 win–loss record.

The club got as far as their season launch for the 1999 NRL season before the club's owners News Ltd agreed to wind up the club before the season started.

== Governing body ==
The South Australian Rugby League is responsible for administering the game of rugby league in South Australia. South Australia is an Affiliated State of the overall Australian governing body the Australian Rugby League.

== Participation ==
Registered players
2021/22	2023/24
2,766	2,207

== State competitions ==
There are five senior clubs and six junior clubs located around Adelaide. Competitions are run from Under 7s through to First Grade.

Representative teams are selected each year to compete in the Australian Secondary Schools Rugby League (ASSRL) National Championships at both 15 and 18 years of age respectively, competing against Western Australia, Victoria, Northern Territory and New South Wales Combined Independent Schools (NSW CIS) at both age levels. Players who compete representing South Australia each year are eligible to be selected into both the Australian Merit Squad and the Australian Affiliated States Merit Squad at the 15 Years championships, and the Australian Schoolboys as well as the Australian Affiliated States team at the 18 Years championships.

== Competitions ==
=== Adelaide Rugby League Premiership ===
The top-level competition in the SARL is also known as NRLSA Metro and is sponsored as the Sportcentre Cup.

=== Current clubs ===
Club Colours	Club Name	Club Moniker	District
Senior
	Adelaide Plains	Brothers	Adelaide
	Central Districts	Roosters	Elizabeth
	Eastern	Eels	Unley
	MEC	Black Swans	Murray Bridge
	South Adelaide	Bulldogs	Mitchell Park
	Western Districts	Warriors	Seaton
Junior Only
	Adelaide Hills	Tigers	Mount Barker

=== Former clubs ===
Colours	Club	District
	Eels Yellow	Adelaide, South Australia
	Henley Beach Raiders	Henley Beach, South Australia
	Mitchell Park Tigers	Adelaide, South Australia
	Northern Districts Dragons	North Adelaide, South Australia
	Port Adelaide Cougars	Adelaide, South Australia
	River City Knights	Adelaide, South Australia
	TEC Titans	Adelaide, South Australia

== Limestone Coast Rugby League ==
The Limestone Coast Rugby League is a competition co-administered by NRL SA and NRL Victoria.

=== Clubs ===
Club	Moniker	Home Ground	District
Blue Lake	Knights	Apollo Soccer Grounds	Mount Gambier, South Australia
Gunditjmara	Bulls	Deakin University	Warrnambool, Victoria
Naracoorte	Jets	Naracoorte United Soccer Ground	Naracoorte, South Australia
Stawell	Mounties	North Park	Stawell, Victoria
Warrnambool	Raiders	Friendly Societies Park	Warrnambool, Victoria

=== Former clubs ===
Colours	Club	District
Horsham	Panthers	Horsham, Victoria
North Warrnambool	Warriors	Warrnambool, Victoria

== Spencer Gulf & Northern SA ==
NRL SA has previously run competitions in the Spencer Gulf region, but the future of these competitions remains unclear as of 2022.

The Olympic Dam Barbarians based in Roxby Downs have played in various formats including intra club and in the Spencer Gulf competition. There have also been efforts to establish the presence of the game in areas including Coober Pedy, however there remains little competitive Rugby League in Northern SA.

=== Former Spencer Gulf Rugby League Clubs ===
Colours	Club	District
Olympic Dam	Barbarians	Roxby Downs
Port Augusta	Goannas	Port Augusta
Port Pirie	Devils/Pirates	Port Pirie
Whyalla	Steelers	Whyalla

== Representative Team ==
The South Australian state team play in the Affiliated States Championship along with the other three affiliated states (Victoria, Tasmania, Northern Territory and Western Australia) plus the Australian Police and Australian Defence Force.

The first instance of rugby league being played in South Australia occurred during the 1914 Great Britain Lions tour of Australia and New Zealand, when the touring Lions beat South Australia 101–0 at Hawthorn Oval in front of 2,500 spectators.

In 1994 and 1995 the then West End XIII played Victoria at the Melbourne Cricket Ground as the curtain raiser game for the State of Origin games in those years. In 1994 the South Australian side had the privilege of being one of the first Rugby League sides to play at that venue in nearly 80 years.

A South Australian representative side has played a number of games against international touring sides, including the Australian team.

Game	Date	Result	Venue	City/Town	Attendance	Notes
1	24 May 1914	Great Britain def. South Australia 101–0	Hawthorn Oval	Adelaide	2,500	1914 Great Britain Lions tour
2	11 August 1948	Australia def. South Australia 96–5	Hawthorn Oval	Adelaide	4,000	1948–49 Kangaroo Tour
3	18 May 1955	France def. South Australia 48–10			1,074	1955 French Tour

== Largest Rugby League Attendances in South Australia ==
The following are the largest rugby league crowds in South Australia.

Top 5 Rugby League Crowds in South Australia
Year	Home	Away	Venue	Crowd
2023	Queensland	New South Wales	Adelaide Oval	48,613
1991	St. George Dragons	Balmain Tigers	Adelaide Oval	28,884
1997	Adelaide Rams	Hunter Mariners	Adelaide Oval	27,435
2020	New South Wales	Queensland	Adelaide Oval	25,218
2017	Sydney Roosters	Melbourne Storm	Adelaide Oval	21,492

== Notable players ==
The following South Australian players have played in the National Rugby League or NRL Women's Premiership.

- Brenton Lawrence (104 games) – Gold Coast Titans (2011–2012), Manly-Warringah Sea Eagles (2013–2017)
- Joel Reddy (137 games) – Parramatta Eels (2005–2011), Wests Tigers (2012–2013), South Sydney Rabbitohs (2014–2016)
- Brad Schneider (currently playing) – Canberra Raiders (2022–present)
- Nathan Vagg (2 games) – Cronulla Sharks (2003)
- Simone Karpani (2021-)
- Asoiva Karpani (2018-)
- David Canterbury (2012–2014)

== Notes and references ==
This article incorporates content from the South Australian Rugby League article.

== See also ==
- Sport in South Australia
- Rugby league in Australia
