= Football in South Australia =

There are numerous codes of football in South Australia.

- For Australian rules football, see Australian rules football in South Australia
  - For the governing body of Australian rules football in South Australia, see South Australian National Football League
- For association football, see Soccer in South Australia
  - For the governing body of association football in South Australia, see Football South Australia
- For rugby league football, see Rugby league in South Australia
  - For the governing body of rugby league football in South Australia, see NRL South Australia
