= Rugby league in Tasmania =

- Governing body: NRL Tasmania
- First played: 1954, Hobart, Tasmania
- Registered players: None in Rugby League; 7,662 (including variants)

Audience records
- Single match: 11,752 (2012 NRL Trial, Melbourne Storm V Brisbane Broncos At North Hobart Oval)

Rugby league is a spectator sport in Tasmania, administered by the Tasmanian Rugby League. Prior to folding in 2015, the Tasmanian Rugby League Premiership was the highest tier of the sport in Tasmania. There are no rugby league competitions currently operating in Tasmania.

== History ==
In the 1950s a rugby league competition was created which continued operating until the early 1960s. In the 1990s, two unsuccessful attempts were made to establish a rugby league competition.

The Tasmanian Rugby League was founded at a meeting at Heathorn's Hotel, Hobart on 2 December 1953 and the first competition was held in 1954 with teams including Bellerive (Eastern Shore), Taroona, Newtown and Canterbury. Players were initially recruited from Hobart Rugby Union teams and the first matches were played on 3 April 1954 at the South St Grounds, Bellerive. The first premiership was won by Taroona.

The first interstate match was played against Victoria on 12 June 1954 with Tasmania winning 18-8.

By the mid 1990s the Tasmanian Rugby League was running a statewide competition which included Seven Hobart teams:

- Glenorchy Stingrays
- Sandy Bay Panthers
- Eastern Shore Eagles
- Newtown Tigers (not connected to the current Hobart Tigers)
- Taroona Bulls
- Hobart City Falcons
- Derwent Valley Sharks

and three regional teams:

- Launceston Clippers
- North West Warriors (not connected to the current Launceston Warriors)
- Smithton Bears

The Tasmanian Rugby League also ran a Northern Tasmanian vs Southern Tasmanian competition during this period. Ben McKinnon from the Launceston Clippers is the only player to have won the statewide best + fairest on two occasions both in his debut season in 1995 and then again in 1997.

Due to dwindling player numbers the competition contracted to four Hobart teams during the early 2000s and midway through the 2003–04 season the senior amateur competition folded as a result of rising public liability insurance costs.

In late 2009 a new senior competition was established through the efforts of local 7HO FM Radio Personality Jason 'Wolfie' Wolfgram (President 09/10), and in conjunction with ARL Rugby League Development Officer, Graham McNaney. The decision to re-establish the competition followed a public forum at the Hotel Grand Chancellor in Hobart on Thursday 25 June 2009.

== Governing body ==
NRL Tasmania (formerly and colloquially known as the Tasmanian Rugby League) is the governing body for rugby league in Tasmania.

== Tasmanian Rugby League Premiership (2009–2015) ==
Rugby league in Tasmania
- Sport: Rugby league
- Inaugural season: 2009
- Ceased: 2014–15
- Number of teams: 14
- Holders: Clarence Eels (2014-15)
- Most titles: Hobart Tigers (3 titles)

The Tasmanian Rugby League Premiership was reborn in 2009. Over its course, the competition consisted of 14 teams at various times:

=== Current Teams ===
- Clarence Eels
- Claremont Cowboys
- Glenorchy Broncos
- Hobart Tigers
- Launceston Warriors
- New Norfolk Raiders
- North West Coast Titans
- Newtown Roosters
- Sorell Bulldogs
- South Hobart Storm
- Southern Rabbitohs
- Sandy Bay Sharks
- Taroona Dragons
- University of Tasmania Panthers

=== Former Teams ===
- Eastern Shore Thunder

=== Premierships ===
Season	Grand Final			Minor Premiership
Season	Premiers	Score	Runners-Up	Minor Premiership
2009–10	Hobart Tigers	54–14	Eastern Shore Thunder	Glenorchy Broncos
2010–11	Hobart Tigers	42–24	Southern Rabbitohs	Hobart Tigers
2011–12	Glenorchy Broncos	36–20	Southern Rabbitohs	Hobart Tigers
2012–13	Hobart Tigers	40–30	Southern Rabbitohs	Launceston Warriors
2013–14	South Hobart Storm	38–18	Hobart Tigers	Hobart Tigers
2014–15	Clarence Eels	20 – 0	Launceston Warriors	Clarence Eels

== Representative Team ==
Tasmania
Team information
- Nickname: Thylacines
- Governing body: NRL Tasmania
- Home stadium: North Hobart Oval
- First game
- Tasmania 18–8 Victoria (Victoria (state)); 12 June 1954, New Town Oval

Tasmania Rugby League Team is the representative team of the Tasmanian Rugby League. They have competed in many competitions since their first game in 1954, most notably in the Affiliated States Championship.

== Popularity ==
Australian Rules is traditionally the most popular football code in Tasmania, due to the state's close proximity to Victoria.

According to WIN Television, the 2014 NRL season generated an average television audience of 10,000 Tasmanians on Fridays and Sundays.

The two premier events in Australian rugby league, the NRL Grand Final and State of Origin, attract television audiences in excess of 40,000 Tasmanians.

Trial matches played in the state have attracted crowds of 3,000, 11,752, and 6,823 respectively.

== NRL Matches in Tasmania ==
NRL club Melbourne Storm have played three NRL trial matches in Hobart, all at the North Hobart Oval

In December 2013, it was reported that the Penrith Panthers were in talks with the Tasmanian Government to play Regular Season Matches in Hobart. However, this proposal never ended up becoming a reality, and no Regular Season NRL matches have ever been played in Tasmania

Date	Game	Ground	Attendance
7/2/98	Melbourne Storm vs Adelaide Rams	North Hobart Oval	3,000
18/2/12	Melbourne Storm vs Brisbane Broncos	North Hobart Oval	11,752
18/2/17	Melbourne Storm vs Canterbury-Bankstown Bulldogs	North Hobart Oval	6,823

== See also ==
- Rugby league in Australia
- Sport in Tasmania
