= Central Highlands Rugby League (Victoria) =

- Sport: Rugby league
- Instituted: 2005
- Ceased: 2012
- Chief executive: Ken James
- Number of teams: 4
- Country: Central Highlands, Victoria, Australia
- Premiers: Wendouree Raiders (2012)
- Related competition: Melbourne Rugby League

Central Highlands Rugby League copyright 2005 SVAA

The Central Highlands Rugby League (CHRL) was a Rugby league competition District in the Australian state of Victoria which operated between 2005 and 2012. It covered the area of Victoria centered on Ballarat and Ararat, and its jurisdiction stretches as far north as Creswick, Warrnambool in the south west, Bacchus Marsh in the east, and Horsham in the west.

== History ==
The CHRL District was established and registered with the ARL and VRL in 2005 by founder Ken James (previously Club Manager of MRL team 'Ballarat Highlanders Rugby League Club') after a necessity arose to start a competition in the western region of Victoria separate from the Melbourne Rugby League (MRL) District.

The CHRL competition started with two junior age levels but in 2008 due to the 11-year drought finally taking its toll on Central Victoria the council deemed the sports grounds used in the competition too dangerous for use. This temporarily ended competition for the CHRL (and some clubs in other sports too). After another 2 years of the fields not being used the councils re-allocated the fields to other purposes, ending the ability for clubs in the CHRL to continue until new home grounds are established.

== Past Clubs in CHRL ==
Colours	Club	Suburb	Ground	Notes
	Ararat Kings/Cowboys	Ararat		Folded
	Ballarat Dragons	Ballarat	Doug Dean Reserve	Folded 2015
	Bendigo Tigers	Bendigo		Folded
	Stawell Devils	Stawell	North Park	Succeeded by Stawell Mounties
	Wendouree Raiders	Wendouree	Doug Dean Reserve	Folded

== Extended competition ==
The CHRL also hosted matches in Ballarat between combined CHRL teams made up of players from both Ballarat Dragons and Ararat Cowboys against Altona Roosters and Sunbury Cougars, both from the MRL District, which expanded the experience of players at district representative level.

== Current ==
There is no club rugby league competition in the region as of 2022, with the exception of the Stawell Mounties who play in the Limestone Coast competition.

== See also ==
- Rugby league in Victoria
- Rugby League Competitions in Australia
