= Amco Cup =

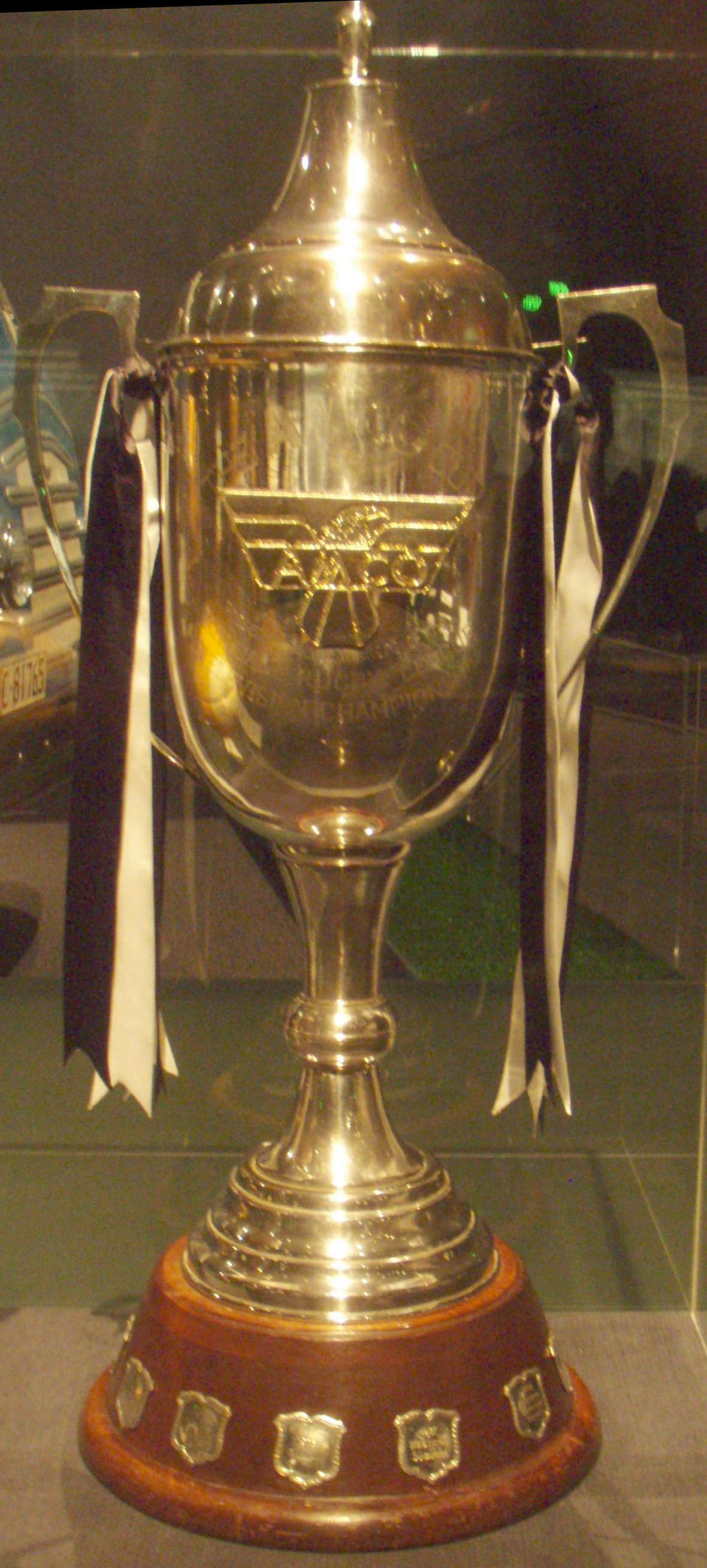
- The Amco Cup Trophy
- Organiser(s): New South Wales Rugby League
- Founded: 1974; 52 years ago
- Abolished: 1989; 37 years ago
- Region: Australia
- Teams: 16-38
- Related competitions: NSWRL, BRL, CRL, QRL, NZRL
- Last champions: Brisbane Broncos (1989)
- Most championships: Balmain (3 titles)

The Amco Cup (subsequently known by various other sponsors' names including the Tooth Cup, KB Cup, National Panasonic Cup and Panasonic Cup) was a mid-week rugby league competition held in Australia between 1974 and 1989. The format was usually a straight knock-out, but various group formats were used between 1979 and 1982. It aired on Channel Ten with Ray Warren and Keith Barnes the commentators for many years. The concept was created by Colin McLennan.

== History ==
Promoter Colin McLennan, who also brought to Australia the jazz legend Benny Goodman and comedians Dudley Moore and Peter Cook, was the man who brought the mid-week Cup to life. The competition was essentially a "made for TV" event, featuring 4 x 20-minute quarters and a penalty countback rule in the event of a draw. Matches were played under floodlights, usually on a Wednesday evening. Initially Leichhardt Oval in Sydney was the main venue, though later matches were played at Lang Park in Brisbane, Parramatta Stadium and various country centres in New South Wales. The competition was scrapped after the increasingly professional clubs resented the additional burdens on their players caused by the mid-week games. In 1990 it was replaced by a preseason challenge cup played for only by the Sydney Rugby League premiership teams.

== Naming rights sponsors ==
- Amco Cup (1974–79)
- Tooth Cup (1980–81)
- KB Cup (1982–83)
- National Panasonic Cup (1984–87)
- Panasonic Cup (1988–89)

== Participating teams ==
| Year | Team/s | NSW City | QLD City | NSW Country | QLD Country | NSW Division 2 | New Zealand | State/Territory | PNG |
|---|---|---|---|---|---|---|---|---|---|
| 1974 | 21 | All 12 | – | All 7 except Newcastle | – | Ryde-Eastwood | Auckland | – | – |
| 1975 | 28 | All 12 | Fortitude Valley, Norths, Past Brothers, Souths | All 8 | Ipswich, Toowoomba | Ryde-Eastwood | Auckland | – | – |
| 1976 | 35 | All 12 | All 7 except Wynnum Manly | All 8 | All 4 except Central Queensland, Gold Coast | Ryde-Eastwood | Auckland, Canterbury | N.T | – |
| 1977 | 37 | All 12 | All 8 | All 8 | All 5 except Gold Coast | – | Auckland, Canterbury | N.T, W.A. | – |
| 1978 | 38 | All 12 | All 8 | All 8 | All 6 | – | Auckland, Wellington | N.T, W.A. | – |
| 1979 | 16 | All 12 | Brisbane | New South Wales; Country | Queensland; Country | – | Auckland | – | – |
| 1980 | 16 | All 12 | Brisbane | New South Wales; Country | Queensland; Country | – | Auckland | – | – |
| 1981 | 16 | All 12 | Brisbane | New South Wales; Country | Queensland; Country | – | Central Districts | – | – |
| 1982 | 18 | All 14 | Brisbane | New South Wales; Country | Queensland; Country | – | South Island | – | – |
| 1983 | 18 | All 14 | Brisbane | New South Wales; Country | Queensland; Country | – | Central Districts | – | – |
| 1984 | 17 | All 13 | Brisbane | New South Wales; Country | Queensland; Country | – | Auckland | – | – |
| 1985 | 16 | All 13 | Brisbane | New South Wales; Country | – | – | Auckland | – | – |
| 1986 | 17 | All 13 | Brisbane | New South Wales; Country | – | – | – | W.A. | Port Moresby |
| 1987 | 20 | All 13 | Brisbane | New South Wales; Country | – | – | – | N.T, S.A., Victoria, W.A. | Port Moresby |
| 1988 | 19 | All 16 | Brisbane | New South Wales; Country | – | – | – | – | Port Moresby |
| 1989 | 19 | All 16 | Brisbane | New South Wales; Country | – | – | – | – | Port Moresby |

== Champions by Year ==
| Year | Winners | Score | Runners-up | Venue | Crowd |
|---|---|---|---|---|---|
| 1974 | Western Division | 6-2 | Penrith | Leichhardt Oval | 16,000 |
| 1975 | Eastern Suburbs | 17-7 | Parramatta | Leichhardt Oval | 18,907 |
| 1976 | Balmain | 21-7 | North Sydney | Leichhardt Oval | 21,670 |
| 1977 | Western Suburbs | 6-5 | Eastern Suburbs | Leichhardt Oval | 15,350 |
| 1978 | Eastern Suburbs | 16-4 | St. George | Leichhardt Oval | 14,000 |
| 1979 | Cronulla | 22-5 | Brisbane | Leichhardt Oval | 15,800 |
| 1980 | Parramatta | 8-5 | Balmain | Leichhardt Oval | 17,829 |
| 1981 | South Sydney | 10-2 | Cronulla | Leichhardt Oval | 23,079 |
| 1982 | Manly | 23-8 | Newtown | Leichhardt Oval | 14,490 |
| 1983 | Manly | 26-6 | Cronulla | Leichhardt Oval | 15,086 |
| 1984 | Brisbane | 12-11 | Eastern Suburbs | Leichhardt Oval | 13,000 |
| 1985 | Balmain | 14-12 | Cronulla | Leichhardt Oval | 15,000 |
| 1986 | Parramatta | 32-16 | Balmain | Leichhardt Oval | 15,839 |
| 1987 | Balmain | 14-12 | Penrith | Parramatta Stadium | 16,823 |
| 1988 | St. George | 16-8 | Balmain | Parramatta Stadium | 22,191 |
| 1989 | Brisbane | 22-20 | Illawarra | Parramatta Stadium | 16,698 |

=== Most NSWRL Midweek Cup Titles ===
| Club | Titles | Years won |
|---|---|---|
| Balmain | 3 | 1976, 1985, 1987 |
| Easts (Sydney) | 2 | 1975, 1978 |
| Parramatta | 2 | 1980, 1986 |
| Manly | 2 | 1982, 1983 |
| Western Division | 1 | 1974 |
| Wests (Sydney) | 1 | 1977 |
| Cronulla | 1 | 1979 |
| Souths (Sydney) | 1 | 1981 |
| Brisbane (Capitals) | 1 | 1984 |
| St. George | 1 | 1988 |
| Brisbane (Broncos) | 1 | 1989 |

== Cup and Premiership in the same season ==
- Easts in 1975.
- Parramatta in 1986.

== See also ==
- City Cup
- NSW Challenge Cup
- Presidents Cup (Rugby League)
- Preseason Cup
- Tooheys Challenge Cup
- Challenge Cup
- FFA Cup
