= Non-League football =

Semi professional football leagues

Non-League football describes football leagues played outside the top leagues of a country. Usually, it describes leagues which are not fully professional. The term is primarily used for football in England, where it is specifically used to describe all football played at levels below those of the Premier League (20 clubs) and the three divisions of the English Football League (EFL; 72 clubs). Currently, a non-League team would be any club playing in the National League or below that level. Typically, non-League clubs are either semi-professional or amateur in status, although the majority of clubs in the National League division (level 5) are fully professional, some of which are former EFL clubs who have suffered relegation.

The term non-League was commonly used in England long before the creation of the Premier League in 1992, prior to which the top football clubs in England all belonged to The Football League (from 2016, the EFL); at this time, the Football League was commonly referred to as simply "the League" and its clubs were "League clubs", so all clubs which were not members of the Football League were therefore 'non-League' clubs. Since 1992, the term "non-League" has come to mean clubs at a lower level than the Football League, as the original definition of being outside the Football League would include Premier League clubs.

== Non-League football in England ==
=== English Football League ===
A non-League match between Maine Road and 1874 Northwich of the North West Counties Football League, part of the ninth level of English football.

The "League" (with a capital 'L') in "non-League football" originally referred specifically to The Football League (now the English Football League, which the Premier League split from in 1992), rather than being a misnomer, as "non-League" clubs do play the majority of their football within a league (with a lower-case 'l') competition. There are many leagues below the level of the EFL, and some, such as the Northern League, are almost as old as the EFL itself. The most senior of these leagues are loosely organised by The Football Association, the sport's governing body in England, into a National League System (NLS). The NLS has six levels or steps and includes over 18 separate leagues, many with more than one division.

Prior to the 1986–87 season, there was no automatic promotion and relegation between The Football League and the leagues of non-League football for nearly a hundred years. Instead, the process of re-election existed; at the end of each season, the bottom clubs of the EFL were required to re-apply for membership, whilst ambitious non-League clubs put themselves up as candidates for admittance against them. All member clubs of the Football League then voted for their choice. In most cases, this was a mere formality; member clubs would typically vote for other existing members and the system ensured that Football League membership remained relatively static, with non-League clubs having very little chance of joining. Since the process began, thirteen non-League clubs had achieved enough votes to win election as a member of the Football League.

However, a major change came in 1986 when automatic promotion and relegation of one club between the League and the Football Conference, the top league in non-League football, was introduced, subject to the eligible club meeting the required facility and financial standards. Scarborough became the first non-League club to win automatic promotion to the League, and Lincoln City became the first League club to be relegated to the ranks of non-League football. Since the 2002–03 season, two clubs from the Conference, now National League (the champions and the winners of a play-off) have been promoted at the end of each season.

The entire English football league system includes the Premier League, the EFL, the NLS leagues, and any local leagues that have feeder relationships with an NLS league.

Many non-League clubs enter the FA Cup, where they hope to become "giant-killers" by progressing from the qualifying rounds, and first and second rounds proper, to meet and beat opposition from the Premier League or EFL Championship. Since the end of the Second World War, only eleven non-League clubs have reached the Fifth Round of the FA Cup, and only one (Lincoln City in 2016–17 season) has reached the quarter-final stage. The only non-League team to have won the competition since The Football League started is Tottenham Hotspur in 1901, although at that time the League had only two divisions, consisting almost entirely of Northern and Midland clubs. The leading clubs in the South played in the Southern Football League, which was of a comparable standard to the League clubs. From its inaugural match in 1908 until 1912, the FA Charity Shield was contested between the champions of the League and the Southern Football League.

=== The FA Trophy and FA Vase ===
The Football Association Challenge Trophy was introduced in 1969 to offer semi-professional non-League clubs a realistic chance of winning an FA competition. Amateur clubs could enter the FA Amateur Cup until 1974 when the Football Association abolished the distinction between professionals and amateurs. The Amateur Cup was replaced by the FA Vase in 1974 which is currently contested by clubs at Step 5 and 6 of the NLS and below while the Trophy is contested by clubs at Steps 1–4.

=== Women's football ===
In women's football, the non-League term is used for those clubs in the divisions below the FA Women's Championship. Formerly it referred to the clubs in the FA Women's Premier League's two regional second divisions.

== Non-League football in other countries ==
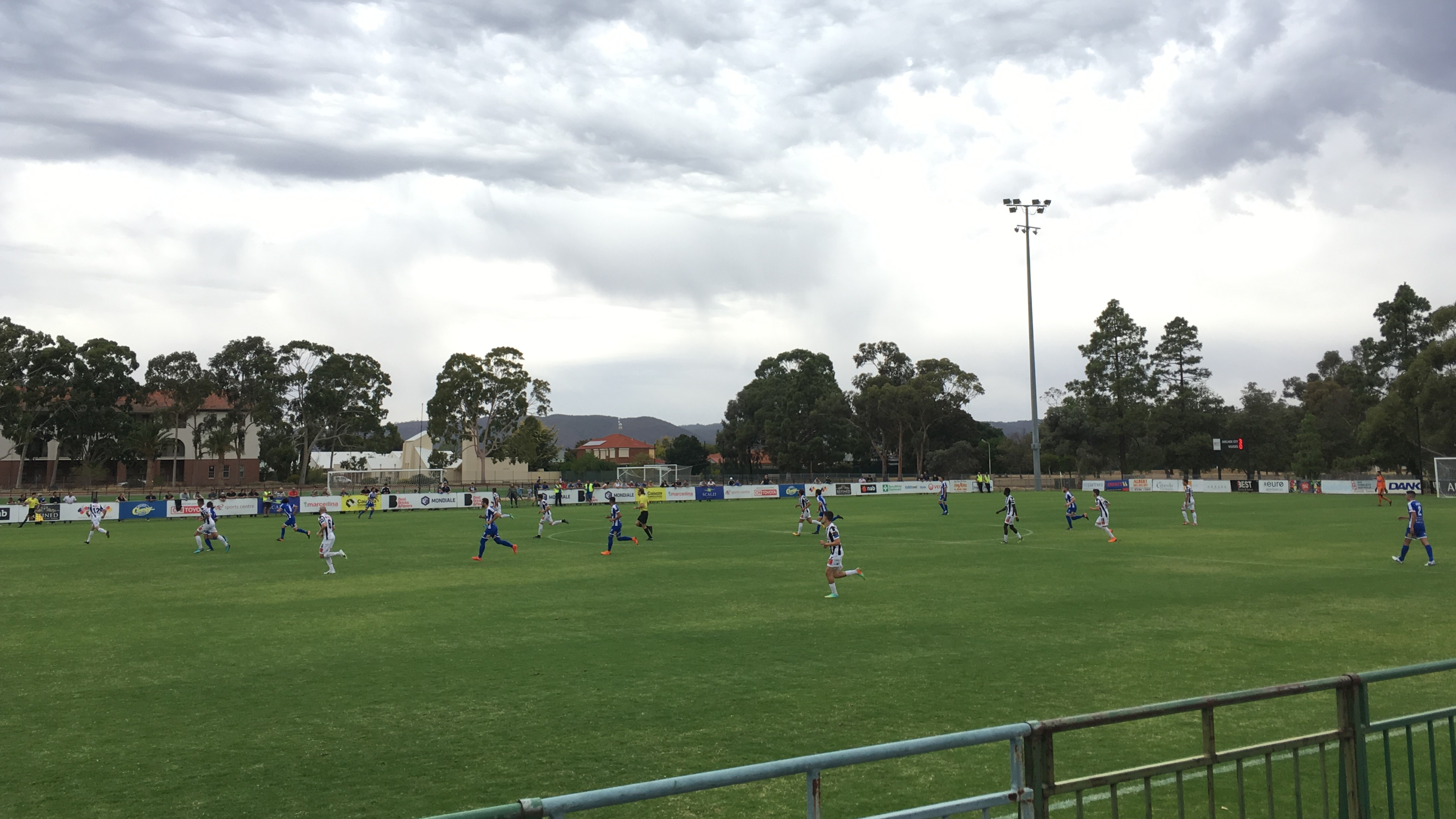
An Australian non-League match between rivals Adelaide City and West Adelaide of the South Australian NPL, part of the second level of Australian soccer.

=== Australia ===
In Australia, non-League refers to competitions outside of the A-League Men as it is the only fully professional league in the country. This comprises the eight National Premier Leagues, various state leagues, and regional leagues.

=== Germany ===
In Germany, there is a similar term, unterklassig (literally "under-class"), which usually refers to regional leagues below the three national leagues 1. Bundesliga, 2. Bundesliga and 3. Liga. The highest level of regional leagues, called Regionalliga, may or may not be included in the term.

=== Republic of Ireland ===
In the Republic of Ireland, football outside the top two divisions consists of regional senior leagues based on which province the club comes from; although again these leagues are commonly referred to as 'non-League'.

=== Scotland ===
In Scotland, "non-League football" refers to leagues outside the top four divisions of the national Scottish Professional Football League. These consist of a number of regional senior leagues which are part of the Scottish football pyramid system.

=== Spain ===
Football below the professional level in Spain is commonly referred to as fútbol modesto (literally "modest football").

=== Ukraine ===
In Ukraine, the concept of a league is related to a method of sports competition that is being held, particularly when a pool of teams plays each other in a round-robin format, often double round-robin. As far as a league or non-league, any teams that do not compete at the national level are considered to be amateur.

== See also ==
- England national football C team
