= West Australian Netball League =

Netball league in Australia

- Founded: 1989; 37 years ago
- Country: Australia
- Region: Western Australia
- Divisions: Open; Under-21; Men's
- Number of clubs: 8
- Level on pyramid: 3
- Current champions: Western Roar
- Most championships: Southside Demons (eight league/open premierships)
- Website: wa.netball.com.au

The West Australian Netball League, also known as the WA Netball League, is a state netball league with teams from Western Australia and organised by Netball Western Australia. It is a third-level league at the national level, below Suncorp Super Netball and the Super Netball Reserves.

The league, originally known as the Gold Netball League, has undergone several other name changes; during the late 2000s and early 2010s, it was known as the Smarter than Smoking Netball League. The league was renamed the West Australian Netball League in 2015; four years later, it became the Gold Industry Group WANL. The league's most successful team overall has been the Southside Demons. During the 2010s, its most successful team was the West Coast Warriors.

== History ==
=== Early years ===
The league began in 1989 as the Gold Netball League, with one division. A reserves division was added the following year, and an under-18 division in 2000. The first-season champions were the Coastal Raiders. The Perth Superdrome Bullets were the dominant team during the early 1990s, winning four consecutive titles from 1991 to 1994 and a fifth title in 1996.

=== Southside Demons ===
The WANL's most successful team has been the Demons. Founded in 1989 and originally based in Kenwick, the Demons have played under several names. They won their first senior premiership in 1997 as KAE Sparks and their second in 2004 as the Southside Sparks. In 2004, they were the first WANL team to win all three divisions. Two years later, after forming a partnership with Perth Football Club, they became the South East Demons. From 2007 to 2010, as the Midland Brick Demons, they won four consecutive senior premierships. As the South East Demons, they won a seventh and eighth premiership in 2013 and 2014. In 2018, they became the Southside Demons. Notable Demons players included Australia internationals Caitlin Bassett and Courtney Bruce, and Jill McIntosh Medal winner Lindal Rohde.

=== West Coast Warriors ===
During the 2010s, the most successful WANL team was the West Coast Warriors. Like the Demons, the Warriors have played under several names. They originally played as the West Coast Warriors before becoming the Wanneroo Warriors, the Compact Warriors, the West Coast Falcons and, in 2014, again the West Coast Warriors. The team won their first senior premiership in 1998. Coached by England international Ama Agbeze and featuring Alicia Janz, they won their second premiership in 2012 as the West Coast Falcons. The team won additional premierships in 2016, 2017, 2019, 2020 and 2021. Other notable Warriors players include three-time Jill McIntosh Medal winner Caitlyn Brown, two-time Jill McIntosh Medal winner and Australian Diamond #189 Donnell Wallam, and two-time Jill McIntosh Medal winner Andrea Gilmore.

=== Men's division ===
From 2001 to 2004, the West Australian Netball League had a men's division. The Bullets were the inaugural premiers, and the Coastals won the other three titles. The men's division was revived in 2018 with four teams: the West Coast Warriors, the Perth Lions, the South East Demons and the Wheatbelt Flames. The Warriors won the first two titles before the Lions won four in a row. The Rangers fielded a men's side in 2024, and the Peel Lightning followed suit two years later.

=== Revamped competition ===
Netball WA announced a revamped competition in 2019, initially with seven clubs (Comets, Rangers, Demons, Jets, Warriors and Roar); Peel Lightning joined for the 2020 season. Now known as GIG WANL and sponsored by the Gold Industry Group, the new format included open, 20U and men's divisions. Most games were played at the Gold Netball Centre, rather than at local-club venues. Jets and Lightning have three home games per season in Eaton and Mandurah, respectively. The 20U division was reworked to 21U for the 2024 season.

Western Roar has been the dominant club in the GIG WANL, winning three open premierships, six 20U/21U premierships and six men's premierships, including five in a row from 2022 to 2026. Roar and West Coast Warriors have jointly won the most open premierships (three).

== Clubs ==
The 2027 season features the following eight clubs. The divisions in which they compete in are in green.

WANL Clubs
Team	Colours	Venue	Affiliated club/association	Region	Founded	Open	21U	Men
Comets		Gold Netball Centre	Hamersley NC; Noranda NA	Perth	2019			
Fremantle Sharks		Gold Netball Centre	Fremantle NA	Perth	2019			
Peel Lightning		Gold Netball Centre; Mandurah Aquatic and Recreation Centre	Peel FNL	Peel	2019			
Rangers		Gold Netball Centre; Mundaring Arena	Kalamunda Districts NA	Perth	1988			
Southside Demons		Gold Netball Centre; Langford Indoor Sports Centre	Southern Districts NA	Perth	1989			
Souwest Jets		Gold Netball Centre; Eaton Recreation Centre	South West FNL	South West	1989			
West Coast Warriors		Gold Netball Centre	Wanneroo Districts NA	Perth	1989			
Western Roar		Gold Netball Centre	None	Perth	2019			

Notes

- Southside Demons previously played as KAE Sparks, Southside Sparks, Midland Brick Demons and South East Demons.
- West Coast Warriors previously played as Wanneroo Warriors, Compact Warriors, West Coast Falcons.
- Western Roar previously played as Perth Lions.

== Grand finals ==
Season	League/Open			Reserves	18U	Men	Venue
Season	Winners	Score	Runners-up	Winners	Winners	Winners	Venue
1989	Coastal Raiders			not contested	not contested	not contested	
1990	Stirling Saints (Stirling)			KAE Sparks	not contested	not contested	
1991	Perth Superdrome Bullets			Raiders	not contested	not contested	
1992	Perth Superdrome Bullets			KAE Sparks	not contested	not contested	
1993	Perth Superdrome Bullets			Perth Superdrome Bullets	not contested	not contested	
1994	Perth Superdrome Bullets			not contested	not contested	not contested	
1995	Coastal Pumas			South West	not contested	not contested	
1996	Superdrome Bullets			Coastal Pumas	not contested	not contested	
1997	KAE Sparks			West Coast Warriors	not contested	not contested	
1998	West Coast Warriors			KAE Sparks	not contested	not contested	
1999	WAIS			Superdrome Bullets	not contested	not contested	
2000	Coastal Sharks			Southside Sparks	Superdrome Bullets	not contested	
2001	Wheatbelt Flames			Southside Sparks	Southside Sparks	Superdrome Bullets	
2002	Wheatbelt Flames			Southside Sparks	Southside Sparks	Coastal Sharks	
2003	Four n Twenty Rangers			Superdrome Bullets	Southside Sparks	Coastal Sharks	
2004	Southside Sparks			Southside Sparks	Southside Sparks	Coastal Sharks	
2005	Rangers			Southside Sparks	Midwest Tigers	not contested	
2006	Rangers			Coastal Sharks	Coastal Sharks	not contested	
2007	Midland Brick Demons			Rangers	Midland Brick Demons	not contested	
2008	Midland Brick Demons	55–50	West Coast Falcons	Wheatbelt Flames	Souwest Jets	not contested	
2009	Midland Brick Demons	59–50	West Coast Falcons	Souwest Jets	West Coast Falcons	not contested	
2010	Midland Brick Demons	59–50	West Coast Falcons	Souwest Jets	Coastal Sharks	not contested	
2011	Coastal Sharks	56–55	Midland Brick Demons	West Coast Falcons	Midwest Tigers	not contested	
2012	West Coast Falcons	52–43	Midland Brick Demons	Coastal Sharks	Rangers	not contested	
2013	South East Demons	62–38	Perth Lions	Coastal Sharks	Coastal Sharks	not contested	
2014	South East Demons	56–46	Perth Lions	Coastal Sharks	Coastal Sharks	not contested	
2015	Perth Lions	49–44	West Coast Warriors	Coastal Sharks	Souwest Jets	not contested	
2016	West Coast Warriors	52–48	South East Demons	Coastal Sharks	Perth Lions	not contested	Curtin Stadium
2017	West Coast Warriors	47–43	Coastal Sharks	Coastal Sharks	Perth Lions	not contested	State Netball Centre
2018	Coastal Sharks	50-47	Perth Lions	Coastal Sharks	Perth Lions	West Coast Warriors	State Netball Centre

Season	League/Open			20U/21U			Men			Venue
Season	Winners	Score	Runners-up	Winners	Score	Runners-up	Winners	Score	Runners-up	Venue
2019	West Coast Warriors	74–65	Western Roar	Western Roar	50-45	West Coast Warriors	West Coast Warriors	47-46	Western Roar	Gold Netball Centre
2020	West Coast Warriors	68-51	Curtin Hamersley Comets	Western Roar	54-36	East Freo Sharks	Western Roar	48-33	West Coast Warriors	Gold Netball Centre
2021	West Coast Warriors	46-41	Western Roar	Rangers	55-35	East Freo Sharks	West Coast Warriors	48-45	Western Roar	Gold Netball Centre
2022	Western Roar	58-40	West Coast Warriors	Western Roar	60-51	Peel Lightning	Western Roar	61-45	Curtin Hamersley Comets	Gold Netball Centre
2023	Hamersley Comets	52-48	Western Roar	Hamersley Comets	60-49	Southside Demons	Western Roar	56-53	West Coast Warriors	Gold Netball Centre
2024	Western Roar	46-45	Hamersley Comets	Western Roar	49-42	Southside Demons	Western Roar	58-34	Hamersley Comets	Gold Netball Centre
2025	Comets	54-43	Western Roar	Western Roar	59-40	West Coast Warriors	Western Roar	56-43	West Coast Warriors	Gold Netball Centre
2026	Western Roar	44-37	Comets	Western Roar	67-64	West Coast Warriors	Western Roar	56-52	Comets	Gold Netball Centre

== Notable players ==
=== Internationals ===
Australia

Diamonds
- Sunday Aryang
- Caitlin Bassett
- Kate Beveridge
- Kelsey Browne
- Courtney Bruce
- Susan Fuhrmann
- Sophie Garbin
- Donnell Wallam
Kelpies
- Stewart Burton
- Daniel Cools
- Jerome Gillbard
- Dravyn Lee-Tauroa
- Dylan McPherson
- Ethan Michael
- Wade Moore

England

- Ama Agbeze

Malawi

- Mwai Kumwenda

=== West Coast Fever ===
- Ama Agbeze
- Jessica Anstiss
- Ruth Aryang
- Sunday Aryang
- Caitlin Bassett
- Emma Beckett
- Kirby Bentley
- Kate Beveridge
- Caitlyn Brown
- Kelsey Browne
- Courtney Bruce
- Sloan Burton
- Ingrid Colyer
- Emma Cosh
- Jordan Cransberg
- Zoe Cransberg
- Susan Fuhrmann
- Andrea Gilmore
- Alicia Janz
- Josie Janz-Dawson
- Mwai Kumwenda
- Annika Lee-Jones
- Olivia Lewis
- Tasha Nykyforak
- Lindal Rohde

=== Jill McIntosh Medal ===
The Jill McIntosh Medal is awarded annually to the WANL's Best and fairest player. Between 1989 and 1990, it was called the Classique Player of the Series and between 1991 and 1993, it was known as the Berri Medal.

Season	Winner	Team
1989	Jodie McGowan	Stirling Saints
1990	Peta Simeon	Sparks
1991	Jenny Jones	Flames
1992	Sharon Jarrott	Perth Superdrome Bullets
1993	Chelsey Mardon	Coastal Pumas
1994	Peta Simeon (2)	Sparks
1995	Waveney Senior	Coastal Pumas
1996	Leith Fradd	Superdrome Bullets
1997	Angela Lloyd-Woods	Jets
1998	Nardine Clarke	Flames
1999	Paula Ferguson	West Coast Warriors
2000	Michelle Atwell	West Coast Warriors
2001	Amanda Santaromita	Bullets
2002	Fiona Mitchell	WAIS-Coastals
2003	Susan Fuhrmann	Jets
2004	Cath Devitt	Coastals
2005	Cath Devitt (2)	Coastals
2006	Kyra Neal	Demons
2007	Kym Hunter	Perth Bullets
2008	Emma Beckett	Sharks
2009	Mia Washbourne	WAIS
2010	Kodie Blay	Midland Brick Demons
2011	Sally Joynes	Sharks
2012	Ama Agbeze	West Coast Falcons
2013	Rochelle McKee	Perth Lions
2014	Ashleigh Neal	South East Demons
2015	Andrea Gilmore	West Coast Falcons
2016	Lindal Rohde	South East Demons
2017	Andrea Gilmore (2)	West Coast Warriors
2018	Olivia Lewis	Coastal Sharks
2019	Donnell Wallam	West Coast Warriors
2020	Donnell Wallam (2)	West Coast Warriors
2021	Ruth Aryang	ECU Souwest Jets
2022	Caitlyn Brown	West Coast Warriors
2023	Georgia Pitt	Rangers
2024	Caitlyn Brown (2)	Western Roar
2025	Caitlyn Brown (3)	Western Roar
2026	Simona Di Filippo	West Coast Warriors

== Sponsorship ==
- c. 2007–2016: Smarter than Smoking
- 2019–present: Gold Industry Group
