= NRL Tasmania =

Rugby league organisation in Tasmania

- Founded: 1953
- Responsibility: Tasmania, Australia
- Headquarters: Cornelian Bay, Tasmania
- Key people: TBA (President)
- Competitions: Tasmanian Rugby League Premiership
- Website: NRL Tasmania Facebook

(Tasmania)

NRL Tasmania (abbreviated as NRLTas, and formerly the Tasmanian Rugby League) is the organisation responsible for administering the game of rugby league in the Australian state of Tasmania. Tasmania is an affiliated State of the overall Australian governing body, the Australian Rugby League.

== History ==
=== 20th Century ===
The Tasmanian Rugby League was founded at a meeting at Heathorn's Hotel, Hobart on 2 December 1953 and the first competition was held in 1954 with teams including Bellerive (Eastern Shore), Taroona, Newtown and Canterbury. Players were initially recruited from Hobart Rugby Union teams and the first matches were played on 3 April 1954 at the South St Grounds, Bellerive. The first premiership was won by Taroona The first interstate match was played against Victoria on 12 June 1954 with Tasmania winning 18-8.

=== 1990s Golden Era ===
Logo prior to 2013

By the mid 1990s the Tasmanian Rugby League was running a statewide competition which included Seven Hobart teams:

- Glenorchy Stingrays (Saints using st george kit)
- Sandy Bay Panthers
- Eastern Shore Eagles
- Newtown Tigers (not connected to the current Hobart Tigers)
- Taroona Bulls
- Hobart City Falcons
- Derwent Valley Sharks (not connected to the current Sandy Bay Sharks)

and three regional teams:

- Launceston Clippers
- Devonport Warriors (not connected to the current Launceston Warriors)
- Smithton Bears

The Tasmanian Rugby League also ran a Northern Tasmanian vs Southern Tasmanian competition during this period. Ben McKinnon from the Launceston Clippers is the only player to have won the statewide best + fairest on two occasions both in his debut season in 1995 and then again in 1997.

Due to dwindling player numbers the competition contracted to four Hobart teams during the early 2000s and midway through the 2003-04 season the senior amateur competition folded as a result of rising public liability insurance costs.

=== 2009 Rebirth ===
In late 2009 a new senior competition was established through the efforts of local 7HO FM Radio Personality Jason 'Wolfie' Wolfgram (President 2009/10), in conjunction with ARL Rugby League Development Officer, Graham McNaney. The decision to re-establish the competition followed a public forum at the Hotel Grand Chancellor in Hobart on Thursday 25 June 2009.

The revised summer competition initially included ten teams:

- Claremont Cowboys
- Glenorchy Broncos
- Hobart Tigers
- Newtown Roosters
- New Norfolk Raiders
- Eastern Shore Thunder
- Southern Rabbitohs
- Sandy Bay Sharks
- Taroona Dragons
- University Of Tasmania Panthers

Gala Days and Under 17s junior exhibition matches have also been a feature of the revised competition. In February 2012 a National Rugby League trial match between Brisbane Broncos and Melbourne Storm was held in Hobart. Another Storm trial was held in Tasmania in 2017 against the Canterbury-Bankstown Bulldogs.

In 2013 the Penrith Panthers had talks to the Tasmanian Government about NRL games in Hobart. The Panthers Were Negotiating With Tasmania's State Government About Playing Games For Premiership Points In Hobart, Most Likely Blundstone Arena Or North Hobart Oval.

The Launceston Warriors were admitted to the competition during the 2012–13 season. A North West Coast Titans team joined the competition in 2013–2014 representing North West Tasmania.

In 2014 The Clarence Eels And The Sorell Bulldogs Join The Competition For The 2014-15 Season.

The competition folded in 2015 from a lack of players and support.

== Tasmanian Rugby League Premiership ==
NRL Tasmania
- Sport: Rugby league
- Inaugural season: 2009
- Ceased: 2014–15
- Number of teams: 14
- Holders: Clarence Eels (2014-15)
- Most titles: Hobart Tigers (3 titles)

The Tasmanian Rugby League Premiership was reborn in 2009.

Over its course, the competition consisted of 14 teams at various times:

=== Current Teams ===
- Clarence Eels
- Claremont Cowboys
- Glenorchy Broncos
- Hobart Tigers
- Launceston Warriors
- New Norfolk Raiders
- North West Coast Titans
- Newtown Roosters
- Sorell Bulldogs
- South Hobart Storm
- Southern Rabbitohs
- Sandy Bay Sharks
- Taroona Dragons
- University of Tasmania Panthers

=== Former Teams ===
- Eastern Shore Thunder

=== Premierships ===
Season	Grand Final			Minor Premiership
Season	Premiers	Score	Runners-Up	Minor Premiership
2009–10	Hobart Tigers	54 – 14	Eastern Shore Thunder	Glenorchy Broncos
2010–11	Hobart Tigers	42 – 24	Southern Rabbitohs	Hobart Tigers
2011–12	Glenorchy Broncos	36 – 20	Southern Rabbitohs	Hobart Tigers
2012–13	Hobart Tigers	40 – 30	Southern Rabbitohs	Launceston Warriors
2013–14	South Hobart Storm	38 – 18	Hobart Tigers	Hobart Tigers
2014–15	Clarence Eels	20 – 0	Launceston Warriors	Clarence Eels

== Representative Team ==
Tasmania

Team information
- Nickname: Thylacines
- Governing body: NRL Tasmania
- Home stadium: North Hobart Oval
- First game
- Tasmania 18 – 8 Victoria (Victoria (state)); 12 June 1954, New Town Oval

Tasmania Rugby League Team is the representative team of the Tasmanian Rugby League. They have competed in many competitions since their first game in 1954, most notably in the Affiliated States Championship.

== NRL Matches in Tasmania ==
NRL club Melbourne Storm have played three NRL trial matches in Hobart, all at the North Hobart Oval.

In December 2013, it was reported that the Penrith Panthers were in talks with the Tasmanian Government to play Regular Season Matches in Hobart. However, this proposal never ended up becoming a reality, and no Regular Season NRL matches have ever been played in Tasmania.

In July 2022, it was reported that the Tasmanian Government were in talks with the Melbourne Storm on bringing games back to Hobart.

In September 2024, it was confirmed the new Macquarie Point Stadium will host one NRL game per season from 2031 onwards.

Date	Game	Ground	Attendance
7/2/98	Melbourne Storm vs Adelaide Rams	North Hobart Oval	3,000
18/2/12	Melbourne Storm vs Brisbane Broncos	North Hobart Oval	11,752
18/2/17	Melbourne Storm vs Canterbury-Bankstown Bulldogs	North Hobart Oval	6,823

== See also ==
- Tasmanian Rugby Union
