= Emma Beckett =

Emma Beckett may refer to:

- Emma Beckett (footballer) (born 1987), Irish footballer
- Emma Beckett (netball) (born 1984), Australian netball player
