= Affiliated States Championship =

Australian rugby league competition

- Sport: Rugby league
- Instituted: 1994
- Number of teams: 6 (current)
- Country: Australia
- Champions: Western Australia (2025)
- Most titles: Western Australia (18 titles)

The Affiliated States Championship is an annual rugby league competition run by the Australian Rugby League involving the five affiliated states (Victoria, South Australia, Northern Territory, Tasmania and Western Australia) plus the Australian Federal Police and Australian Defence Force.

Following the Championship, a Combined Affiliated States (CAS) representative side is selected from the teams to tour the Pacific islands.

== History ==
The initial Championship had Australian Capital Territory and Newcastle in it because they were the two strongest competitions outside of the Queensland Rugby League and New South Wales Rugby League.

The Championship resumed in 2003 with just the four Affiliated states. The PRLA Australian team joined the competition in 2005.

The Affiliated Championships have over the past few years (2010–2014) been held at Hindmarsh Stadium in Adelaide, however in 2015 they were held in Darwin Northern Territory.

2016 saw the championships return to Adelaide, and were played at Thebarton Oval in Torrensville, with Western Australia winning their seventh consecutive title.

== Teams ==
NRL Affiliated Championship Teams
Affiliated Championship Team	Colours	Titles	Years Of Affiliated Championship Titles Won	Current Championship Status
Australian Capital Territory Raiders		1	1997	Currently Competing
(New South Wales) Newcastle (Firsts)		1	1995	Formerly Competing
Northern Territory Titans		1	2004	Currently Competing
South Australia Croweaters		0	None	Currently Competing
Tasmania Thunder		0	None	Currently Competing
(Victoria (state)) Victoria Storm		4	2009, 2019, 2023, 2024	Currently Competing
Western Australia Black Swans		18	1994, 1996, 2003, 2005, 2006, 2007, 2008, 2010, 2011, 2012, 2013, 2014, 2015, 2016, 2017, 2018, 2022, 2025	Currently Competing

== Combined Affiliated States ==
On 20 October 2017, a Combined Affiliated States team played the English national team as a warm-up for the 2017 World Cup. England won 74–12 at Perth Oval.

Combined Affiliated States
Starting line-up		Interchange	Coaching staff
1 Stephen Widders – Rockingham Coastal Sharks (WA); 2 Jordan Jacob – South Perth Lions (WA); 3 Tusiga Losi – Waverley Oakleigh Panthers (Vic); 4 Ben Taylor – North Beach Sea Eagles (WA); 5 Arana Masoe – Northern Thunder (Vic); 6 Delane Edwards (c) – Fremantle Roosters (WA); 7 Brandon Purcell – Central Districts Roosters (SA)	8 Benjamin Bolth – Rockingham Coastal Sharks (WA); 9 Andrew Jeffrey – Rockingham Coastal Sharks (WA); 10 Paul Jennings – Katherine Cowboys (NT); 11 Brandon Taua'a – Casey Warriors (Vic); 12 Bradley Gibson – Fremantle Roosers (WA); 13 Jarrod Thompson – Fremantle Roosters (WA)	14 Terry Constantinou – Sunbury Tigers (Vic); 15 Scott Jones – South Perth Lions (WA); 16 Gillespie Fai – Joondalup Giants (WA); 17 Tere Kaue – Western Districts Warriors (SA); 18 Jerome Edwards – Palmerston Raiders (NT); 19 Tiaan Wilkins – Sunbury Tigers (Vic); 20 Jake Busby – Central Districts Roosters (SA)	Head coach: Merg Mikaelian; Legend: (c) Captain(s); (vc) Vice-captain(s)

== Winners (men's) ==
Year	Colours	Champions
1994		Western Australia
1995		Newcastle (Firsts)
1996		Western Australia
1997		Australian Capital Territory
2003		Western Australia
2004		Northern Territory
2005		Western Australia
2006		Western Australia
2007		Western Australia
2008		Western Australia
2009		Victoria
2010		Western Australia
2011		Western Australia
2012		Western Australia
2013		Western Australia
2014		Western Australia
2015		Western Australia
2016		Western Australia
2017		Western Australia
2018		Western Australia
2019		Victoria
2020		Not held due to COVID-19 pandemic
2021		Not held due to COVID-19 pandemic
2022		Western Australia
2023		Victoria
2024		Victoria
2025		Western Australia

== Winners (women's) ==
Year	Colours	Champions
2015		Western Australia
2016		Western Australia
2017		Western Australia
2018		Victoria
2019		Victoria
2020		Not held due to COVID-19 pandemic
2021		Western Australia
2022		
2023		
2024		
2025		

== Winners (under 18's) ==
Year	Colours	Champions
2009		Victoria
2010		Victoria
2011		Victoria
2012		Victoria
2013		Victoria
2014		Victoria
2015		Victoria
2016		Victoria
2017		Victoria
2018		Victoria
2019		Victoria
2020		Not held due to COVID-19 pandemic
2021		Not held due to COVID-19 pandemic
2022		Victoria
2023		Victoria
2024		Victoria
2025		

== See also ==
- Rugby League Competitions in Australia
- Women's National Championship
