= Donnell Wallam =

Australian netball player (born 1994)

Personal information
- Born: 13 January 1994 (age 32) Harvey, Western Australia
- Height: 190 cm (6 ft 3 in)

Netball career
- Playing position: GS
Years	Club team	Apps
2019-2020	West Coast Warriors	
2021	Leeds Rhinos	
2022 - 2024	Queensland Firebirds	
2025	Northern Mystics	
Years	National team	Caps
- Australian Diamonds

Donnell Wallam (born 23 January 1994) is an Australian netball player for the Northern Mystics in the ANZ Premiership. In October 2022, Wallam became the third Indigenous netballer to represent the Australian Diamonds following Marcia Ella and Sharon Finnan.

Wallam, a Noongar woman, grew up Korijekup (Harvey), a small rural town two hours south of Perth. She played basketball before moving to netball. She travelled to Waroona to play netball and was encouraged by netball coach Daniel Cools to try out for the Western Australia Netball League (WANL) in December 2018.

In 2019, her first year in the Western Australia Netball League playing for West Coast Warriors, she won the Jill McIntosh Medal and the League Player's Player of the Year. In 2020, Wallam was selected for the WANL All-Stars that played West Coast Fever. Wallam was selected for the Western Sting in the Australian Netball League but the 2020 season was cancelled due to COVID.In 2020, she played for the West Coast Warriors and again won the Jill McIntosh Medal and the League Player's Player of the Year. Wallam's rapid development led to her being offered a 2021 Super Netball training partner contract with the West Coast Fever.

Wallam moved to England in 2021 to play for Leeds Rhinos in the Netball Superleague but in her second game broke her arm. She returned to play after seven weeks and was rated as the competition's most accurate shooter at 95 per cent. Wallam's season was further cut short as she returned home due to the death of her grandmother.

In 2022, she played for the Queensland Firebirds in Suncorp Super Netball League replacing goal shooter Romelda Aiken. In her first season, she scored 519 goals and finished in the top 20 players for Nissan Net Points. These performances led to Wallam being named in the Australian Diamonds Squad for the 2022 Commonwealth Games and went to Birmingham as one of three travelling reserves.

Prior to her first game for the Australian Diamonds, Wallam sought an exemption from wearing the Hancock Prospecting logo on her playing uniform due to the link to Lang Hancock, its founder, who advocated for the genocide of "problem" Indigenous people. This resulted in meetings between Netball Australia, Diamonds players and Hancock Prospecting and led to extensive media coverage. Hancock Prospecting then withdrew its sponsorship to Netball Australia.

Against this backdrop, Wallam played her first game for the Australian Diamonds on 26 October 2022 against the England Roses in Newcastle. Wallam came into the game with ten minutes to the final whistle and shot eight out of eight including the winning goal with seconds to play. Her Australian Diamonds number is 189.

In 2024, Wallam signed with the Northern Mystics for the 2025 ANZ Premiership season, the team falling short in the grand final.

In 2025, Wallam returned to Australian shores after signing with the Sunshine Coast Lightning for the 2026 Suncorp Super Netball season.

== Recognition ==
- 2022 - Australian Institute of Sport Emerging Athlete of the Year
