= Lindal Rohde =

Australian rules footballer

Personal information
- Born: 21 September 1990 (age 36)
- Original team: Subiaco (WAFL Women's)
- Draft: 2019 Rookie signing
- Debut: Round 1, 2020, Fremantle vs. Geelong, at Fremantle Oval
- Height: 172 cm (5 ft 8 in)
- Position: Midfielder

Playing career^{1}
Years	Club	Games (Goals)
2020	Fremantle	5 (0)
- ^{1} Playing statistics correct to the end of 2020 season.

Career highlights
- WAFL Women's Cath Boyce Rookie of the Year, 2019

Lindal Rohde (born 21 September 1990) is an Australian rules footballer who played for the Fremantle Football Club in the AFL Women's (AFLW).

A former netballer, Rohde was recruited as a rookie selection ahead of the 2019 AFL Women's draft. Her debut season for Subiaco in the WAFL Women's league was very successful, winning the Cath Boyce Rookie of the Year award. As a netballer she won the Jill McIntosh Medal in 2016 as the best player in the West Australian Netball League. Rohde has also played netball for both West Coast Fever and Western Sting. In August 2020, she was delisted by Fremantle.
