= Northern Territory rugby league team =

Australian rugby league team

Team information
- Nickname: Bulls, Titans
- Governing body: NRL Northern Territory
- Home stadium: Territory Rugby League Stadium

The Northern Territory rugby league team has represented the Australian state of Northern Territory in rugby league football. Also known as the Titans

Representative rugby league football in Northern Territory has history going back to the early days of the NTRL.

The Northern Territory team play in the Affiliated States Championship along with the other three affiliated states (South Australia, Victoria, Tasmania and Western Australia) plus the Australian Police and Australian Defence Force. They won the title in 2004.

The Northern Territory competed in the Amco Cup in 1977, 1978 and 1987.

The Northern Territory competed in the 1977 Pacific Cup. The team had little success, winning only one of their four games. The team finished at fourth out of fifth position on the ladder. 1977 was the only time the Northern Territory made an appearance in the Pacific Cup.

== See also ==
- Rugby league in the Northern Territory
