= Western Australia rugby league team =

Team information
- Nickname: Black Swans
- Governing body: Western Australian Rugby League
- Home stadium: NIB Stadium

The Western Australia rugby league team has represented the Australian state of Western Australia in rugby league football. Also known as the Black Swans

Representative rugby league football in Western Australia has history going back to the early days of the WARL. The first interstate match played by Western Australians was against the Northern Territory in 1956, with WA winning the series 2–1.

In 1969 Darwin City invited the WARL to Darwin to play a match in celebration of Darwin's 100th founding anniversary in which WA won 23–19. In 1976 WA was invited to participate in the nationwide Amco Cup, where they defeated the Northern Territory 23–18.

In 1975 Western Australia participate in the 1975 Pacific Cup and 1977 Pacific Cup.

NT toured again in 1983 & 1985 and since 1994 Western Australia has competed annually in the Affiliated States Championship, winning the most titles (16) of any state and 9 straight consecutive titles from 2010–2018.

== International touring teams in WA ==
International football also has a history in WA, with Great Britain Lions touring Perth in 1950, 1343, 1957, 1962, 1975 and France touring in 1951, 1964.
