= Nathan Vagg =

Australian rugby league player

Personal information
- Full name: Nathan Vagg
- Born: 14 February 1983 (age 43) Adelaide, South Australia, Australia

Playing information
- Position: Prop
Club
Years	Team	Pld	T	G	FG	P
2003	Cronulla Sharks	2	0	0	0	0

Nathan Vagg (born 14 February 1983) is an Australian former rugby league footballer who played in the 2000s. He played for the Cronulla-Sutherland Sharks. His position of choice was prop.

== Playing career ==
Vagg was born in Adelaide, South Australia. He began his rugby league career playing for the Northern District Dragons in the South Australian Rugby League competition. Vagg joined the Cronulla-Sutherland Sharks in the 2003 season. He made his first grade debut from the bench in his side's 40−16 victory over the Manly Warringah Sea Eagles at Toyota Park in round 9 of the 2003 season. He played only one more game of first grade which was in his side's 30−14 victory over the South Sydney Rabbitohs at Toyota Park the following week. Vagg was released by the Sharks at the end of the 2003 season, and subsequently never played first grade rugby league again.

After his departure from the Cronulla club, Vagg went on to play for the South City Bulls in the Group 9 Rugby League competition.
