= Brenton Lawrence =

Australian rugby league footballer

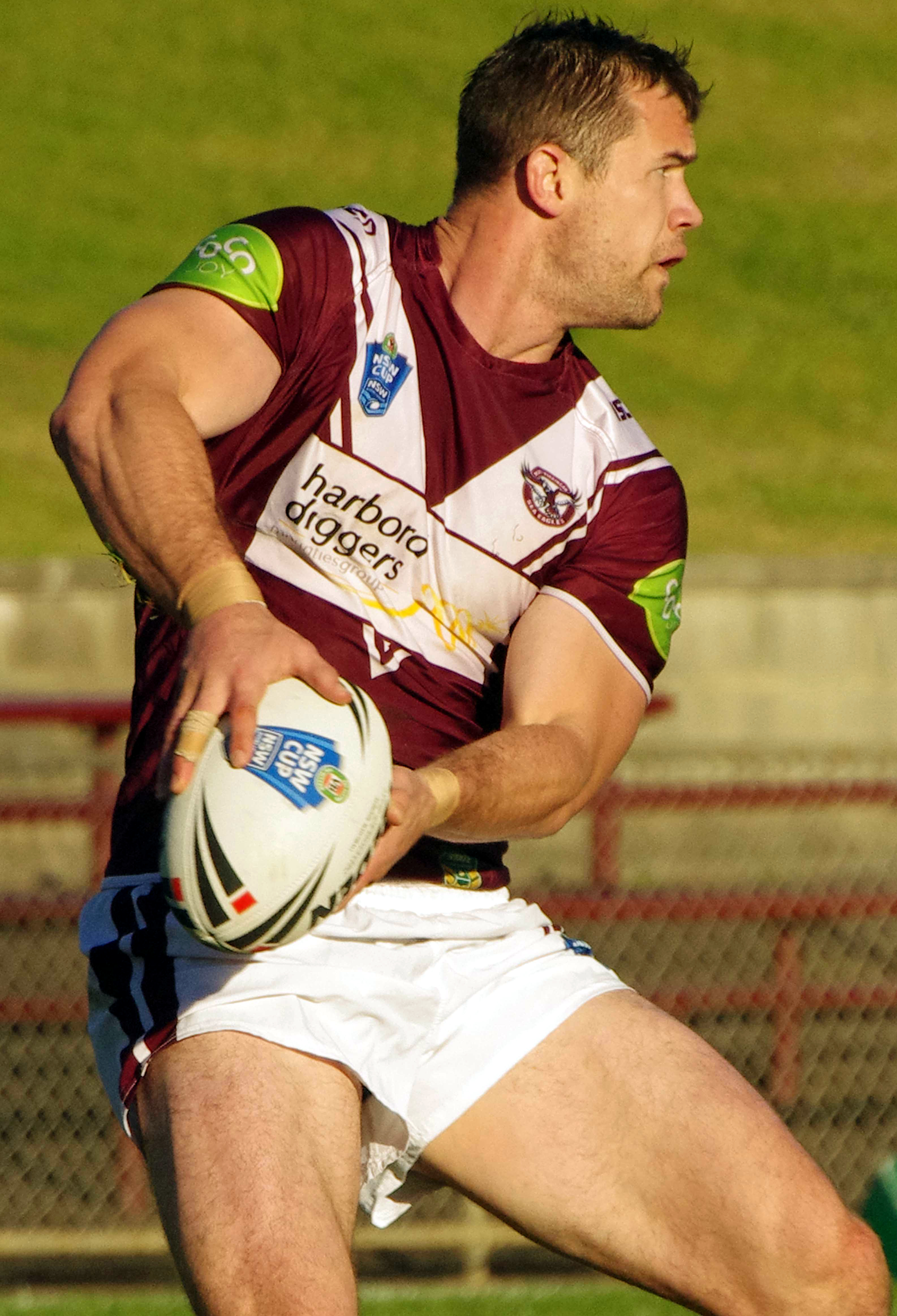

Personal information
- Born: 29 December 1984 (age 41) Mackay, Queensland, Australia

Playing information
- Height: 190 cm (6 ft 3 in)
- Weight: 105 kg (16 st 7 lb)
- Position: Prop
Club
Years	Team	Pld	T	G	FG	P
2011–12	Gold Coast Titans	18	2	0	0	8
2013–17	Manly Sea Eagles	86	6	0	0	24
	Total	104	8	0	0	32
Representative
Years	Team	Pld	T	G	FG	P
2014	Prime Minister's XIII	1	0	0	0	0

Brenton Lawrence (born 29 December 1984) is an Australian former professional rugby league footballer who played as a prop in the 2010s.

== Background ==
Lawrence was born in Mackay, Queensland, Australia.

== Early career ==
Lawrence moved to Adelaide in South Australia when he was only 4 after his father Marty, was posted to the Edinburgh RAAF base in the cities northern suburbs. His family settled in the newly built northern suburb of Andrews Farm and Brenton went on to attend Smithfield Plains High School.

After ignoring calls from his primary school friends to play Australian rules football (the leading winter sport in Adelaide), Lawrence began playing rugby league at the age of nine for the northern Adelaide based club Central Districts Roosters in the South Australian Rugby League. He attributes this decision to his league-loving dad, and because of rugby league's advertising campaign which at the time was led by international pop music artist Tina Turner and her hit song Simply The Best.

Brenton Lawrence was selected to the South Australian Under-15 team in the late 1990s, and in 2002 he toured England and France with the Australian Schoolboys while attending Erindale College in Canberra. The tour was ultimately unsuccessful as the Schoolboys lost a test series on tour to the England Academy for the first time. Among his teammates on tour were a number of future NRL players including Michael Weyman, Keith Galloway, Ben Hannant, Ryan Hoffman, Tom Learoyd-Lahrs, Heath L'Estrange and Jacob Lillyman.

Following the 2002 Schoolboys tour he was signed to a youth contract by the Canberra Raiders at the age of 17. He stayed with the Raiders for five seasons, playing under 18s, under 20s and Reserve Grade, though he did not play first grade for the club.

In 2008 Lawrence captained Woden Valley Rams in the Canberra District Rugby League competition. 2009 saw Lawrence take on the role as Captain/Coach as he led the Rams to the preliminary finals, the team's highest placing in 10 seasons.

== Playing career ==
=== Gold Coast Titans ===
After a chance phone call from mate and Burleigh Bears captain Scott Smith, Lawrence relocated to the Gold Coast and played out the remainder of the 2010 Queensland Cup season for the Bears. His impressive form caught the attention of the Gold Coast Titans and he was invited to train with them during the off-season. Brenton begun 2011 back playing with the Burleigh Bears but finally made his NRL debut in round 16 of the 2011 NRL season against the Cronulla-Sutherland Sharks at Skilled Park. Only days later he signed a two-year deal with the Gold Coast Titans. He went on to play nine games for the Gold Coast in his debut season where the club finished with the Wooden Spoon, and doubled that tally by playing a further nine games for the club in 2012.

=== Manly-Warringah Sea-Eagles ===
Lawrence signed a two-year deal with Manly-Warringah Sea Eagles from the 2013 NRL season. He made his debut for Manly-Warringah in their 22–14 win over the Brisbane Broncos at Suncorp Stadium in round 1 of the season. He proved to be a revelation for Manly in his debut year with the club, playing 27 games including the 26–18 loss in the 2013 NRL Grand Final to the Sydney Roosters. His form up front for Manly saw him talked about as a possible selection in Australia's 2013 Rugby League World Cup squad, though he ultimately missed selection.

In early 2014, despite being 29 years of age, he was included in Queensland's emerging talent squad and he has been touted as a possible State of Origin selection for the Maroons in 2014. Queensland born Lawrence, who spent most of his time growing up in Adelaide, declared himself a Queenslander in 2013 and this was confirmed when he met the NRL's new criteria for Origin selection which states a player had to be born in either state or living in either before the age of 13.

Lawrence, who at the time was reportedly the fastest player at Manly-Warringah over 40 metres, scored his first try for the club in their round 6 win over the Cronulla-Sutherland Sharks at Brookvale Oval on 13 April 2014. His performances for Manly in 2014 saw him win the club's Best and Fairest and Clubman of the Year awards. He was also rewarded with selection in the Prime Minister's XIII for their annual end of season clash with the Papua New Guinea Kumuls.

Lawrence's 2015 NRL season proved to be a disaster both personally and for Manly who missed the finals for the first time since 2004. A back injury suffered early in the opening round against Parramatta saw him sidelined for much of the season. He returned late in the year to play a few games for Manly in the NSW Cup competition (reserve grade), though a knee injury and further injury to his back required season ending surgery.

=== Return to the Gold Coast ===
At the beginning of the 2017 NRL season, Lawrence was released by the Manly club forcing him into free agency, however he quickly attracted the attention of the NRL with the Newcastle Knights and his former club the Gold Coast Titans both approaching him with promising deals. Despite Newcastle having the advantage for most of the race, Lawrence agreed to join the Titans on a two-year deal that began in the 2018 NRL season. In November 2017, Lawrence announced his retirement from rugby league.
