= Rugby league in the Australian Capital Territory =

- Governing body: New South Wales Rugby League
- Representative team: Australian Capital Territory
- Registered players: 3,637
- Clubs: 9

Club competitions
- Canberra Rugby League

Audience records
- Single match: 26,476 (17 September 2010). NRL Canberra Raiders v Wests Tigers (Canberra Stadium, Canberra)

Rugby league is one of the most popular codes of football in the Australian Capital Territory. The Canberra Raiders of the National Rugby League became the Territory's first professional sports team when they were established in 1982. For decades before that rugby league clubs in the area had been competing and providing footballers for representative sides that played against domestic and foreign teams.

== Governing body ==
The New South Wales Rugby League (NSWRL) is the governing body for the sport of rugby league in New South Wales and the Australian Capital Territory.

== Participation ==
Registered players
2019	2023/24
1,088	3,637

== National Rugby League Teams ==
The National Rugby League (NRL) is Australia's top-level competition for the sport of rugby league.

The Canberra Raiders are Canberra's National Rugby League team, being admitted to the competition in 1982.

Club	Location	Home Ground(s)	First season
Canberra Raiders	Canberra	GIO Stadium	1982

== Canberra Rugby League ==
The Canberra Rugby League competition is more commonly known as the Canberra Raiders Cup, covering the Australian Capital Territory and surrounding New South Wales towns Queanbeyan, Goulburn and Yass. The competition is run under the auspices of the Country Rugby League and players are eligible for selection in the Monaro Division of the CRL Divisional Championships.

== Representative rugby league ==
ACT players are eligible to represent Country in the NSWRL City vs Country Origin in an annual match against a City side selected by the NSWRL. It is played before the Rugby League State of Origin series and is often referred to as a selection trial for the New South Wales Blues team.

They can also go onto play for New South Wales Blues in the State of Origin series against Queensland Maroons.

An Australian Capital Territories representative side took part in the early Affiliated States Championship.

== See also ==
- Rugby league in Australia
- Rugby league in New South Wales
- Sport in the Australian Capital Territory
