= 7HOFM =

7HOFM (7HHO)
- Hobart, Tasmania; Australia
- Frequency: 101.7 MHz

Programming
- Format: Adult contemporary

Ownership
- Owner: ARN; (Commercial Broadcasters Proprietary Limited)

History
- First air date: 13 August 1930
- Former call signs: 7HO (1930–1990)
- Former frequencies: 890 kHz (1930–1935); 860 kHz (1935–1978); 864 kHz (1978–1990)
- Call sign meaning: "Hobart" (second H added in AM-FM conversion)

Technical information
- Licensing authority: ACMA
- ERP: 36 kW
- Transmitter coordinates: 42.897566°S 147.236358°E

Links
- Public licence information: Profile
- Website: 7HOFM

7HOFM (call sign 7HHO) is one of three commercial radio stations in Hobart, Tasmania, Australia. It commenced broadcasting on 13 August 1930, as the first commercial radio station in its city.

The station's initial frequency was 890 kHz AM, in 1935 moving to 860 kHz, then in 1978 to 864 kHz. The "HO" derives from the surname of the founder of the station Ron Hope, not Hobart as many may believe.

On 1 November 1990, 7HO converted to the FM band – 101.7 MHz. The official call-sign was changed to 7HHO but the station identified on-air as "Mix 101 HOFM". It then rebranded as "HOFM", and on 5 November 2007, it re-added the "7" to its branding, changing its on-air name to "7HOFM". The first Announcer on the new FM station was Brett Marley.

7HOFM is owned by ARN and has local programming and news. The music format is adult contemporary music.

== Cooke and Moore ==
The station's breakfast comedy show was for many years hosted by Bob Cooke and Richard Moore. The show started in 1982. Cooke retired in the late 1990s and became a hobbyist woodworker. Moore retired in 2013. Prior to working together on the radio show, Cooke and Moore had hosted a television show for children on Hobart's TVT-6 and performed as a stage act.

The Cooke and Moore Show's style of comedy was consistently lowbrow and was very similar to that of Daryl Somers during his tenure as the host of Hey Hey It's Saturday. Cooke and Moore also played a number of fictional character on-air, including Mickey Finn and Knocker Knowles (a shady used car salesman and his dim-witted, former AFL footballer accomplice), Vinnie and the V8s (a music group best known for their hit song 'Outside Coles on a Saturday Night'), Whimmo the Wonder Clown and the R-Rated Cowboy. Much of Cooke and Moore's humour involved general banter between them in the guises of their various characters. Their humour also characteristically featured heavy use of crudeness and sexual double-entendres.

== 7HO and DAB+ ==
Early in 2019 DAB started commercial broadcasting in Hobart.

As a commercial FM operator in the Hobart area, 7HO was granted space on the new DAB Mux.

This MUX is operated by Digital Radio Broadcasting Hobart Pty Ltd, and operates at 20,000W on 202.928 MHz. It utilises vertically polarised transmissions and is co-located in the Broadcast Australia Site on Mt Wellington, the same facility that houses 7HO's FM service.

7HO is available on DAB, along with ARN's stable mate KIX Country.

On 1 June 2019 saw a new locally produced station added to the DAB service. It is on-air as 7HO Classic Hits and is DAB only. It carries a mix of classic hits and talk. Weekdays it carries Tasmania Talks, 9 till 12, then it reverts to music programming. Grant Broadcasters locally produced News Service, as per 7HO's FM service, is carried at the top of the hour.

== Acquisition by ARN ==
In November 2021, 7HO, along with other stations owned by Grant Broadcasters, were acquired by the Australian Radio Network. This deal will allow Grant's stations, including 7HO, to access ARN's iHeartRadio platform in regional areas. The deal was finalized on January 4, 2022. It is expected 7HO will integrate with ARN's KIIS Network, but will retain its current name according to the press release from ARN.

== The Hobart Jingle ==
7HO is famous in London for being mentioned on an advertising jingle for Hobart. Originally played for amusement on Capital Radio during the morning by Chris Tarrant, the jingle quickly became a running gag. This culminated in Chris Tarrant doing a tour of Australia, finishing with broadcasting his morning show to Londoners from the studios of 7HO in Hobart on the last day of his tour.
