= Emma Beckett (netball) =

Australian netball player

Personal information
- Born: 16 November 1984 (age 41) Kojonup, Western Australia
- Height: 1.81 m (5 ft 11 1/2 in)
- School: Perth College
- University: University of Western Australia

Netball career
- Playing positions: GD, WD
Years	Club team	Apps
2003–2007	Perth Orioles	
2009–2010	West Coast Fever	
- Updated on 2009-04-25

Emma Beckett (born 16 November 1984) is a former Australian netball player in the ANZ Championship who played for the West Coast Fever. Beckett previously played in the Commonwealth Bank Trophy for the Fever, then called the Perth Orioles, from 2003 to 2007.
