= Limestone Coast Rugby League =

- Sport: Rugby league
- Instituted: 2017
- Inaugural season: 2017
- Ceased: 2022
- Number of teams: 5
- Country: Victoria
- Premiers: Gunditjmara Bulls (2019)
- Most titles: Naracoorte Jets (2 titles)
- Website: NRL Victoria website

The Limestone Coast Rugby League was a rugby league competition held in the Wimmera and South West regions of Victoria and Eastern South Australia. The competition is co-administered by NRL South Australia and NRL Victoria, and features five clubs (three from Victoria and two from South Australia).

== History ==
The competition was founded in 2017, with four inaugural clubs; the Blue Lake Knights, Horsham Panthers, Naracoorte Jets and Warrnambool Raiders.

The competition was initially dominated by the Naracoorte Jets, who won the first two titles, before Warrnambool broke through for their maiden premiership in 2019.

The competition garnered national attention in 2022 after the ABC News channel ran a series of stories on the Stawell Mounties team which entered the competition for their inaugural season. The side made their way into the Grand Final, where they were defeated 22-8 by the Gunditjmara Bulls.

The competition folded however in the following months as NRL Victoria withdrew the three remaining Victorian clubs, leaving only the two South Australian clubs, who were unable to continue the competition with such a low number of teams.

== Clubs ==
Five clubs competed in the 2022 season; Blue Lake (Mount Gambier), Gunditjmara (Warrnambool), Naracoorte, Stawell and Warrnambool.

Club	Moniker	Home Ground	District
Blue Lake	Knights	Apollo Soccer Grounds	Mount Gambier, South Australia
Gunditjmara	Bulls	Deakin University	Warrnambool, Victoria
Naracoorte	Jets	Naracoorte United Soccer Ground	Naracoorte, South Australia
Stawell	Mounties	North Park	Stawell, Victoria
Warrnambool	Raiders	Friendly Societies Park	Warrnambool, Victoria

=== Former clubs ===
Club	Moniker	District
Horsham	Panthers	Horsham, Victoria
North Warrnambool	Warriors	Warrnambool, Victoria

== Grand Finals ==
Year	Winner	Score	Loser	Venue
2017	Naracoorte Jets	26-24	Warrnambool Raiders	Naracoorte United Soccer Ground, Naracoorte
2018	Naracoorte Jets	32-30	Warrnambool Raiders	Deakin University, Warrnambool
2019	Warrnambool Raiders	46-22	Naracoorte Jets	Apollo Soccer Grounds, Mount Gambier
2020	Cancelled due to COVID-19 pandemic in Victoria			
2021	Cancelled due to COVID-19 pandemic in Victoria			
2022	Gunditjmara Bulls	22-8	Stawell Mounties	North Park, Stawell
