= NRL South Australia =

Rugby league agency in South Australia

- Formerly named: South Australian Rugby League
- Responsibility: South Australia
- Headquarters: Hindmarsh Stadium, Holden Street, Hindmarsh, South Australia
- Key people: Stuart Davis (Chair)
- Website: http://www.nrlsa.com.au/

(South Australia)

NRL South Australia (abbreviated as NRLSA, formerly the South Australian Rugby League) is a not-for-profit organisation responsible for administering the game of rugby league in the state of South Australia. It was formed on 28 July 1976 and is an affiliated state of the Australian Rugby League Commission.

== History ==
In the 1940s the Port Adelaide rugby union club split itself into four rugby league clubs, which formed the basis of the first organised rugby league competition in the state, run under the banner of the Amateur South Australian Rugby League. The first South Australian representative team was formed in the early 1950s and traveled to play the South Sydney Rabbitohs in Sydney, NSW where they lost 45–10.

The first iteration of the South Australian Rugby League was created in the 1950s when Australian soldiers formed a small four team competition based out of the Woomera Test Range. This body ceased to exist when the soldiers were transferred to the Northern Territory.

The current SARL was incorporated on 28 July 1976 and originally featured teams from Northern Districts, South Adelaide, Port Adelaide, Glenelg, Norwood and West Lakes.

Today the competition features eight senior clubs and seven junior clubs, competitions are run from Under 7's through to First Grade.

Branding of the South Australian Rugby League

Former logo

Former logo

Former logo

Current logo

== Representative Team ==
The South Australian state team play in the Affiliated States Championship along with the other four affiliated states (Victoria, Tasmania, Northern Territory and Western Australia) plus the Australian Police and Australian Defence Force.

The first instance of rugby league being played in South Australia occurred during the 1914 Great Britain Lions tour of Australia and New Zealand, when the touring Lions beat South Australia 101-0 at Hawthorn Oval in front of 2,500 spectators.

In 1994 and 1995 the then West End XIII played Victoria at the Melbourne Cricket Ground as the curtain raiser game for the State of Origin games in those years. In 1994 the South Australian side had the privilege of being one of the first Rugby League sides to play at that venue in nearly 80 years.

A South Australian representative side has played a number of games against international touring sides, including Australian team.

Game	Date	Opponent	Result	Score	Venue	City/Town	Crowd	Notes
1	24 May 1914	Great Britain	Loss	101–0	Hawthorn Oval	Adelaide	2,500	1914 Lions Tour
2	11 August 1948	Australia	Loss	96–5	Hawthorn Oval	Adelaide	4,000	1948–49 Kangaroo Tour
3	18 May 1955	France	Loss	48–10	Norwood Oval	Adelaide	1,074	1955 Chanticleers Tour

== NRL SA Metro ==
The NRL SA Metro is the top-level men's competition in South Australia.

=== Current clubs ===
Club Colours	Club Name	Club Moniker	District
Senior
	Adelaide Plains	Brothers	Adelaide
	Central District	Roosters	Elizabeth
	Eastern District	Eels	Unley
	MEC	Black Swans	Murray Bridge
	South Adelaide	Bulldogs	Mitchell Park
	Western Districts	Warriors	Woodville
Junior Only
	Adelaide Hills	Tigers	Mount Barker

=== Former clubs ===
Club Colours	Club Name	Club Moniker	District
	Eels Yellow	Eels	Adelaide
	Henley Beach	Raiders	Henley Beach
	Mitchell Park	Tigers	Adelaide
	Northern Districts	Dragons	North Adelaide
	Port Adelaide	Cougars	Port Adelaide
	River City	Knights	Adelaide
	TEC	Titans	Adelaide

=== Premiership history ===
Adelaide Rugby League History
- The 2005 Grand Final was contested between Eels and Central Districts at Hanson Reserve, Adelaide on 21 August 2005. The Eels won 22–18.
- In 2006 the SARL celebrated its 30th anniversary with the Tigers Rugby League Club securing both the Reserve and First Grade premierships, as well as coming runners-up in the Under 18 competition, losing to the Aberfoyle Dragons Under 18 outfit.
- In 2009 the Aberfoyle Dragons beat the Tigers Rugby League club in a dirty match, winning 34–6 with a man down due to a fight near half time. This was also the first time a team had won the premiership two times in a row.
- In 2009 the competition saw the return of reserve grade in a modified version called "Senior 11's." All clubs had 11 aside, 5 metre line and scorer defends at the restart. It brought many ex players back to clubs and has promoted many debutants an avenue to play the game. The Roosters adapted to the modified rules and pace of the game and went undefeated in the 2009 season to see the Cougars in the grand final under lights at Hindmarsh. Although it started out a grind, the Roosters took control, leaving the Cougars behind 54–20. In the A-grade grand final the Eels beat South Adelaide in a close match with the final try being scored in the last forty seconds of the match.
- During the 2010 season the Tier A High Schools competition is held with U-15's & U-18's playing in round robin matches stretching approximately 12 weeks. Gawler High School took the U-18's grand final against the champions for the last seven years in Aberfoyle Park. The Gawler region has been a feeder to the local club the Roosters. In the Senior 11's the Eels went undefeated all year to take out the premiership and the A-grade Eels went on to be both Minor and overall Premiers.
- The 2012 Sports Centre Cup Division 1 Grand Final was won by Central Districts Roosters in an epic battle against Northern Districts Dragons at Hindmarsh Stadium. In the same year, Cougars won the Sports Centre Cup Division 2 Grand Final against Eels.
- The 2013 Sports Centre Division 1 Grand Final was again won by Central Districts Roosters in a replay of the 2012 grand final with Northern District Dragons at Victoria Park.
- Central Districts Roosters played Henley Beach Raiders in the 2014 Grand Final. With the Roosters reduced to 12 players before halftime, a late surge from the defending premiers saw the match extend into overtime with the Roosters sealing the win.
- The 2016 premiership saw the Central Districts Roosters once again triumph over the Henley Beach Raiders at Hanson Reserve.

2025 - On 31 August 2025 the Western Districts Warriors played against Murray Bridge Swans in the 2025 Grand Final. Western Districts Warriors won the Grand Final 22-10.

=== NRL SAW ===
The NRL SAW is the top-level women's competition in South Australia.

Colours	Clubs	Moniker	District
	Eastern	Eels	Adelaide
	South Adelaide	Bulldogs	Glenelg
	Western District	Warriors	Henley Beach

== Former Competitions ==
=== Limestone Coast Rugby League ===
The Limestone Coast Rugby League was a competition co-administered by NRL SA and NRL Victoria. It was discontinued following the 2022 season.

==== Former Limestone Coast Rugby League clubs ====
Club	Moniker	Home Ground	District
Blue Lake	Knights	Apollo Soccer Grounds	Mount Gambier, South Australia
Gunditjmara	Bulls	Deakin University	Warrnambool, Victoria
Naracoorte	Jets	Naracoorte United Soccer Ground	Naracoorte, South Australia
Stawell	Mounties	North Park	Stawell, Victoria
Warrnambool	Raiders	Friendly Societies Park	Warrnambool, Victoria
Horsham	Panthers		Horsham, Victoria
North Warrnambool	Warriors		Warrnambool, Victoria

=== Spencer Gulf Rugby League ===
NRL SA has previously run competitions in the Spencer Gulf region, but the future of these competitions remains unclear as of 2022.

The Olympic Dam Barbarians based in Roxby Downs have played in various formats including intra club and in the Spencer Gulf competition. There have also been efforts to establish the presence of the game in areas including Coober Pedy, however there remains little competitive Rugby League in Northern SA.

==== Former Spencer Gulf Rugby League clubs ====
Colours	Club	District
Olympic Dam	Barbarians	Roxby Downs
Port Augusta	Goannas	Port Augusta
Port Pirie	Devils/Pirates	Port Pirie
Whyalla	Steelers	Whyalla

== Notable SARL juniors competed in the NRL ==
The following South Australian junior players have played in the National Rugby League.

Northern Districts Dragons

- Nathan Vagg (2 games) – Cronulla Sharks (2003)

South Adelaide Bulldogs

- Joel Reddy (137 games) – Parramatta Eels (2005–2011), Wests Tigers (2012–2013), South Sydney Rabbitohs (2014–2016)

Central Districts Roosters

- Brenton Lawrence (104 games) – Gold Coast Titans (2011–2012), Manly-Warringah Sea Eagles (2013–2017)

== See also ==
- Rugby league in South Australia
