= NRL Victoria =

Australian rugby league governing body

- Founded: 1952
- Responsibility: Victoria, Australia
- Headquarters: Seabrook Reserve, Broadmeadows
- Competitions: First Grade, Second Grade, Third Grade, Women's Tackle, Women's Tag, Girls' Tag, Under 18, Under 17, Under 16, Under 15, Under 14, Under 13, Under 12, Under 11, Under 6-10

NRL Victoria (abbreviated as NRLVic, and formerly the Victorian Rugby League) is responsible for administering the game of rugby league in Victoria, Australia. Victoria is an Affiliated State of the overall Australian governing body the National Rugby League. The VRL commenced in 1952 and has been running each year since.

NRL Victoria administers the Storm Premiership in Melbourne, and the regional Goulburn Murray Storm Premiership competitions.

Prior to 2013 NRL Victoria was known as the Victorian Rugby League before the NRL completed a full rebranding exercise and renamed all affiliate states.

Over the years the VRL have produced a number of juniors for the Melbourne Storm, SG Ball, NYC and NRL teams.

== Rugby League Centre of Excellence ==
NRL Victoria is currently headquartered at Victoria's Rugby League Centre of Excellence at Seabrook Reserve in Broadmeadows, which also serves as the administration base for Touch Football Victoria and as the home ground for Northern Thunder. Construction commenced in 2021 and was completed in 2023, at the cost of $16.9 million.

The facility additionally serves as a hub for rugby league programs and a venue for training, camps and state and national level tournaments, and is also set to serve as the home ground of any future Melbourne Storm NRLW team. The facility includes a show pitch, three community access competition pitches, a female-friendly pavilion including high-performance training and recovery facilities, and car parking.

== Melbourne Rugby League ==
The Melbourne Rugby League has been running since the 1950s. The competition was rebranded in 2022 to become the Storm Premiership, aligning with the strong Storm identity for Rugby League in Victoria.

RAAF Ballarat were the inaugural premiers while the Truganina Rabbitohs are the most recent premiers in 2024.

=== Current clubs ===
| Colours | Rugby League Clubs | Location | Home Ground | Founded |
|---|---|---|---|---|
| | Altona Roosters | Altona Meadows | Bruce Comben Reserve | 1987 |
| | Bendigo Crushers | Bendigo | Epsom Huntly Recreation Reserve | 2024 |
| | Casey Warriors | Cranbourne East | Casey Fields | 2010 |
| | Doveton Steelers | Doveton | Betula Reserve | 2001 |
| | Eastern Raptors | Boronia | Colchester Reserve | 2011 |
| | Frankston Raiders | Frankston | Riviera Reserve | 2015 |
| | Geelong Sharks | Geelong | Ervin Reserve | 2023 |
| | Hume Eagles | Craigieburn | Bridges Recreation Reserve | 2020 |
| | Melbourne Storm | Melbourne | Casey Fields | 1997 |
| | Melton Broncos | Melton | Mt Carberry Reserve | 2013 |
| | Mernda Dragons | Lalor | Huskisson Reserve | 2015 |
| | Northern Thunder | Broadmeadows | Seabrook Reserve | 1999 |
| | North West Wolves | Niddrie | AJ Davis Reserve | 2010 |
| | Peninsula Dolphins | Mount Eliza | To Be Confirmed | 2024 |
| | Pakenham Eels | Pakenham | Comely Banks Recreation Reserve | 2016 |
| | Truganina Rabbitohs | Truganina | Clearwood Drive Reserve | 2015 |
| | Waverley Oakleigh Panthers | Clayton | Fregon Reserve | 1976 |
| | Werribee Bears | Werribee | Haines Reserve | 2008 |
| | South Eastern Titans | Dandenong | Greaves Reserve | 2007 |
| | Sunshine Cowboys | Ardeer | More Park | 2016 |
| | Sunbury United Tigers | Sunbury | Langama Park | 1992 |

== Goulburn Murray Storm Premiership ==
The Murray Cup is a rugby league competition on the border of Victoria and New South Wales. Initially the competition was established in 1998 as the Goulburn Murray Rugby League by the Country Rugby League and the Victorian Rugby League. The league was disbanded in 2009 before being re-established as the Murray Cup in 2015. As of 2025 the competition was renamed to the Goulburn Murray Storm Premiership and consists of 7 teams for the Senior Men's league and 8 teams for the Women's Tag league.

=== Current clubs ===
There are currently eight clubs affiliated with the competition.

| Clubs | Moniker | Ground | Men's | LLT |
|---|---|---|---|---|
| Border | Bears | Baranduda Recreation Reserve, Wodonga | Yes | Yes |
| Charles Sturt University | Mud Dogs | Sarvaas Park, North Albury | No | Yes |
| Corowa | Cougars | Airport Oval, Corowa | Yes | Yes |
| Shepparton | Eagles | Pee Wee Oval, Mooroopna | Yes | Yes |
| Tumbarumba | Greens | Tumbarumba Showground | Yes | Yes |
| Wangaratta | Knights | Glenrowan Recreation Reserve | Yes | Yes |
| Wodonga | Wombats | Baranduda Recreation Reserve, Wodonga | Yes | Yes |

== Former Competitions ==
=== Central Highlands Rugby League (2005-2012) ===
The Central Highlands Rugby League (CHRL) was a rugby league competition in western Victoria. It covered an area centred on Ballarat, stretching north to Creswick, south to Warrnambool, east to Bacchus Marsh, and west to Horsham.

The CHRL competition started with two junior age levels but in 2008 due to the 11-year drought finally taking its toll on Central Victoria the council deemed the sports grounds used in the competition too dangerous for use. This temporarily ended competition for the CHRL (and some clubs in other sports too). After another two years of the fields not being used the councils re-allocated the fields to other purposes, ending the ability for clubs in the CHRL to continue until new home grounds are established.

==== Former clubs ====
| Colours | Club | Moniker | Years participated | Location | Ground |
|---|---|---|---|---|---|
| | Ararat | Kings, Cowboys | | Ararat | |
| | Ballarat | Dragons | 2005-2012 | Ballarat | Doug Dean Reserve, Delacombe |
| | Bendigo | Tigers | | Bendigo | |
| | Stawell | Devils | | Stawell | |
| | Wendouree | Raiders | | Wendouree | Doug Dean Reserve, Delacombe |

NRL Victoria are currently looking for opportunities for Rugby League in this region as of 2023.

=== Limestone Coast Rugby League (2017-2022) ===
The Limestone Coast Rugby League was a rugby league competition held in the Wimmera and South West regions of Victoria and Eastern South Australia. The competition was co-administered by NRL SA and NRL Victoria, and featured five clubs (three from Victoria and two from South Australia).

==== Clubs ====
| Colours | Club | Moniker | Years Participated | Ground | District | State |
|---|---|---|---|---|---|---|
| | Blue Lake | Knights | | Apollo Soccer Grounds | Mount Gambier | South Australia |
| | Gunditjmara | Bulls | | Deakin University | Warrnambool | Victoria |
| | Naracoorte | Jets | | Naracoorte United Soccer Ground | Naracoorte | South Australia |
| | Stawell | Mounties | | North Park | Stawell | Victoria |
| | Warrnambool | Raiders | | Friendly Societies Park | Warrnambool | Victoria |

=== Sunraysia-Riverlands Rugby League (1991-2022) ===
The Sunraysia-Riverlands Rugby League is a rugby league competition held in North-Western Victoria.

==== Clubs ====
| Colours | Club | Town | Ground |
|---|---|---|---|
| | Mildura Tigers | Mildura | Nichols Point Reserve, Nichols Point |
| | Mildura Warriors | Mildura | Nichols Point Reserve, Nichols Point |
| | Robinvale Storms | Robinvale | Robinvale Sports Ground, Robinvale |

== Victoria Rugby League Notable Juniors ==
Altona Roosters

- Jeremy Smith
- Gareth Widdop
- Charnze Nicoll-Klokstad
- Kurt Bernard
- Ben Nakubuwai
- Tony Tumusa
- Jamayne Taunoa-Brown
- Shae Ah-Fook
- Siulagi Tuimalatu-Brown
- Troy Hanita-Paki (u20s)

Casey Warriors

- Kelma Tuilagi

North West Wolves

- Greg Marzhew

Northern Thunder

- Young Tonumaipea
- Richard Kennar
- Sualauvi Fa'alogo

South Eastern Titans

- Mahe Fonua
- Eddy Tuilotolava
- Kenny Bromwich
- Francis Tualau

Waverley Oakleigh Panthers

- Drury Low
- Denny Solomona
- Pride Petterson-Robati
- Jarred Muller-Dobbe
- Kalin Ropata
- Trent Toelau (u20s)

Sunbury Tigers

- Dean Ieremia
- Fonua Pole
- Sione Finau

Casey Warriors

- Connor Donehue
- Kelma Tuilagi

== Representative Team ==
The Victoria team play in the Affiliated States Championship along with the other three affiliated states (South Australia, Tasmania, Northern Territory and Western Australia) plus the Australian Police and Australian Defence Force. In 2007 Victoria came fourth in the ARL Affiliated States Championships in Perth.

They won their first championship in 2009

== See also ==
- Rugby league in Victoria
