= Australian rules (disambiguation) =

Australian rules most often refers to the sport Australian rules football.

Australian rules may also refer to:

- Australian Rules (film), a 2002 Australian film

== See also ==
- Australian Football League
- Football in Australia
