= Football in Australia =

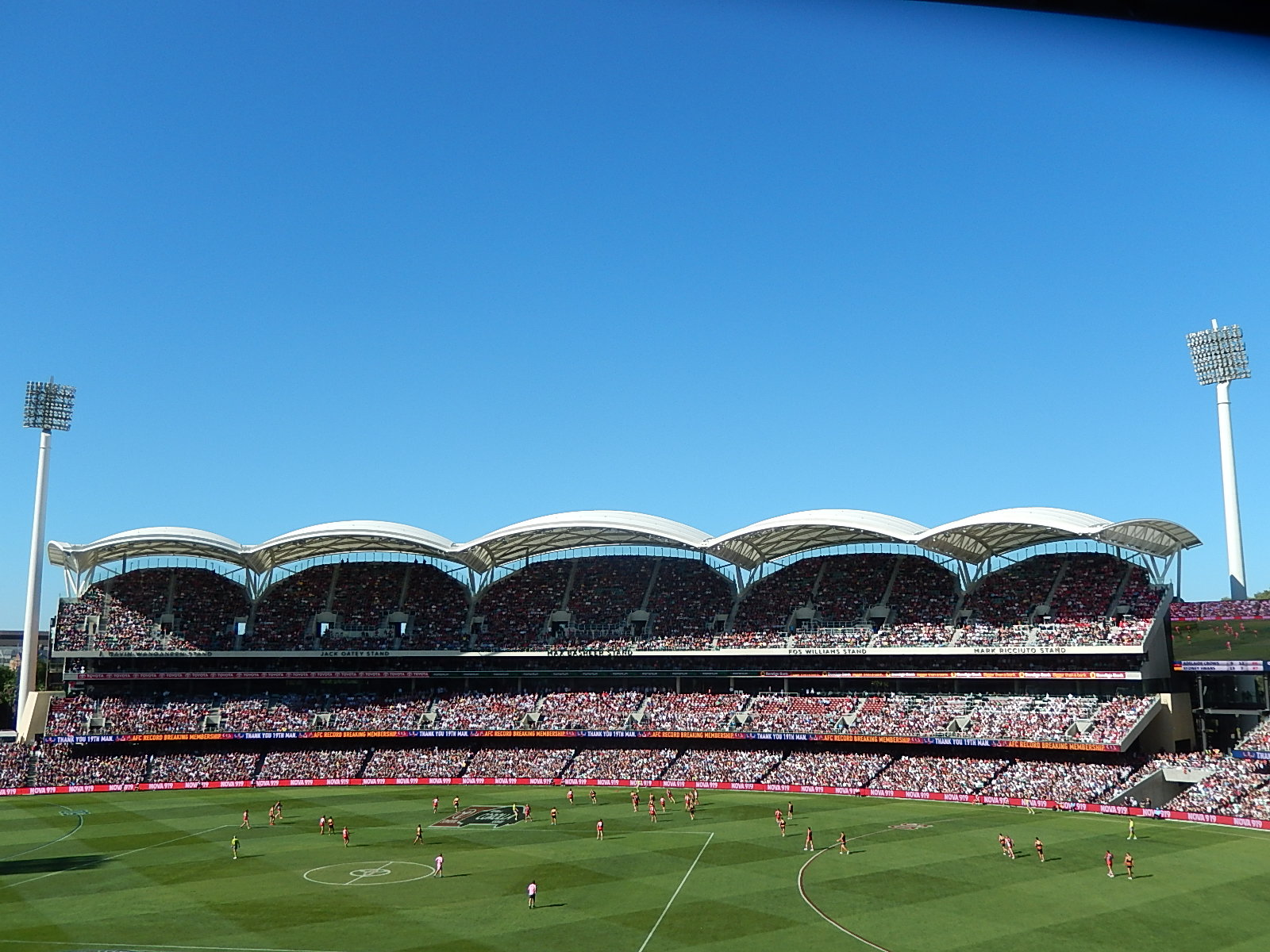
Australian rules: AFL match at the Adelaide Oval, South Australia

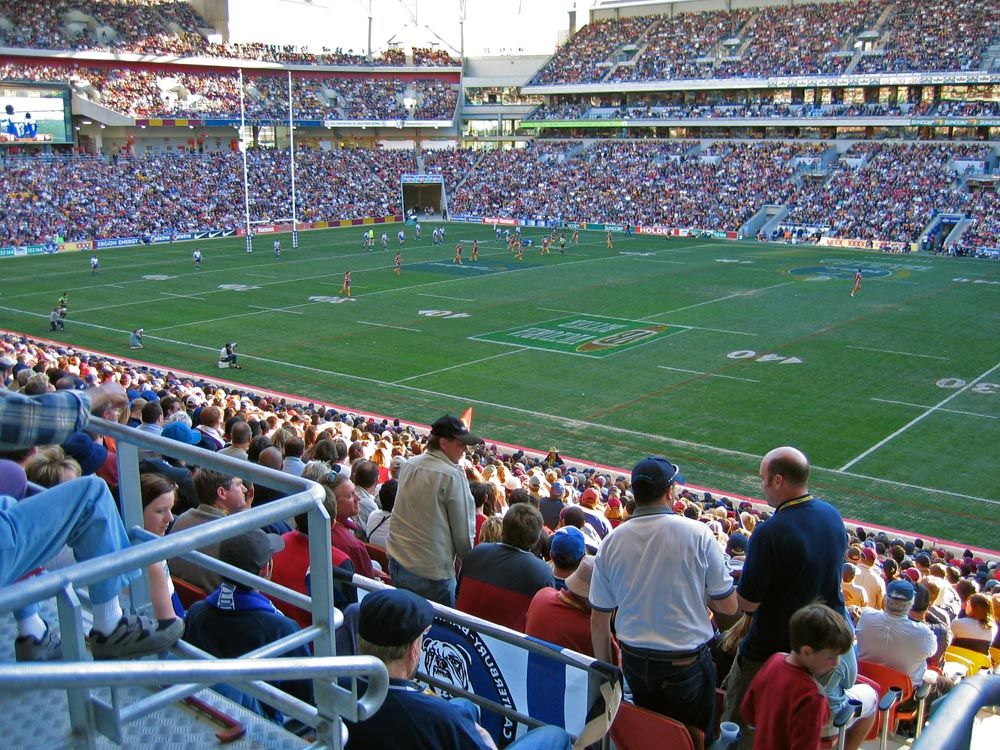
Rugby league: NRL match at Suncorp Stadium, Queensland

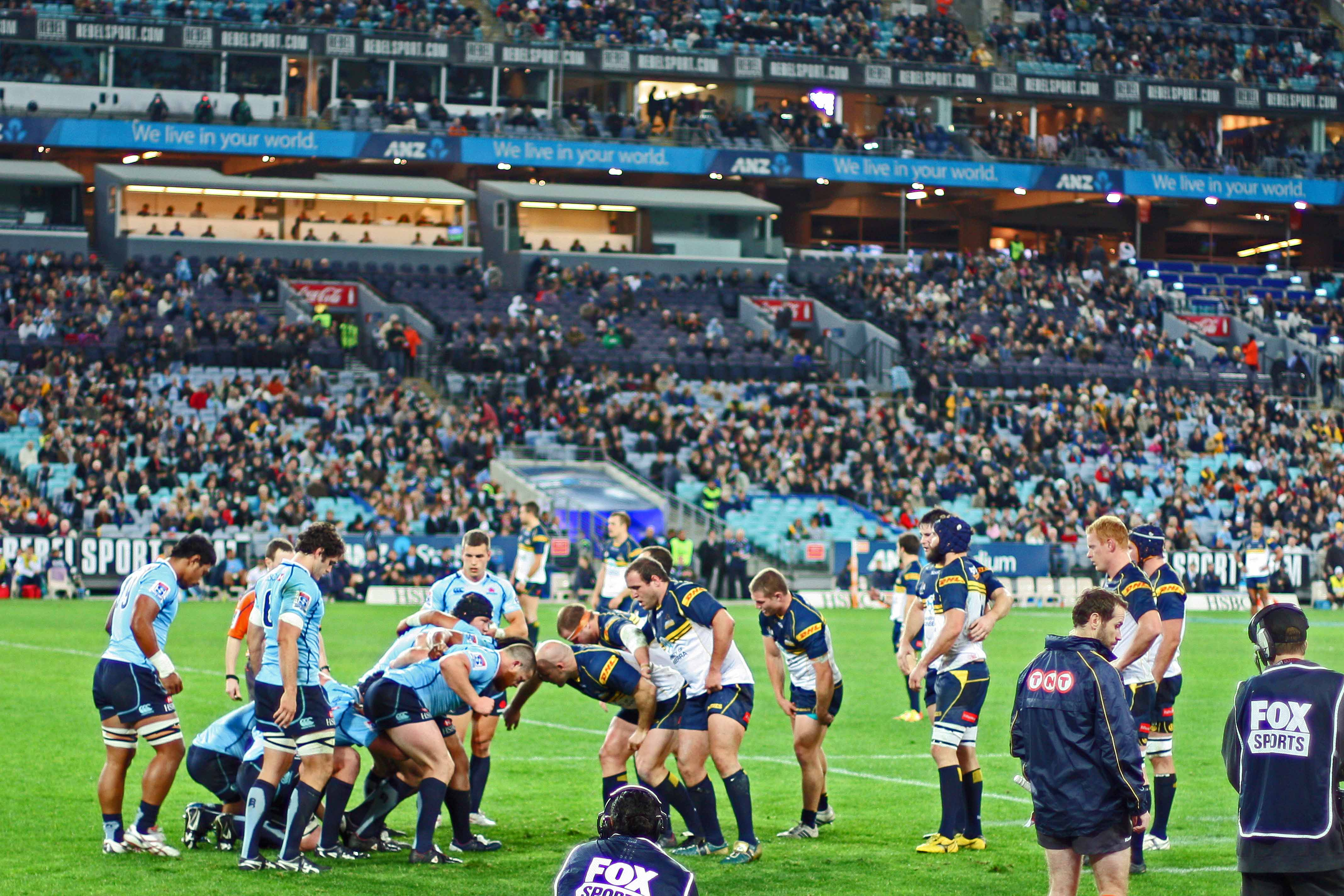
Rugby union: Super Rugby at ANZ Stadium, New South Wales

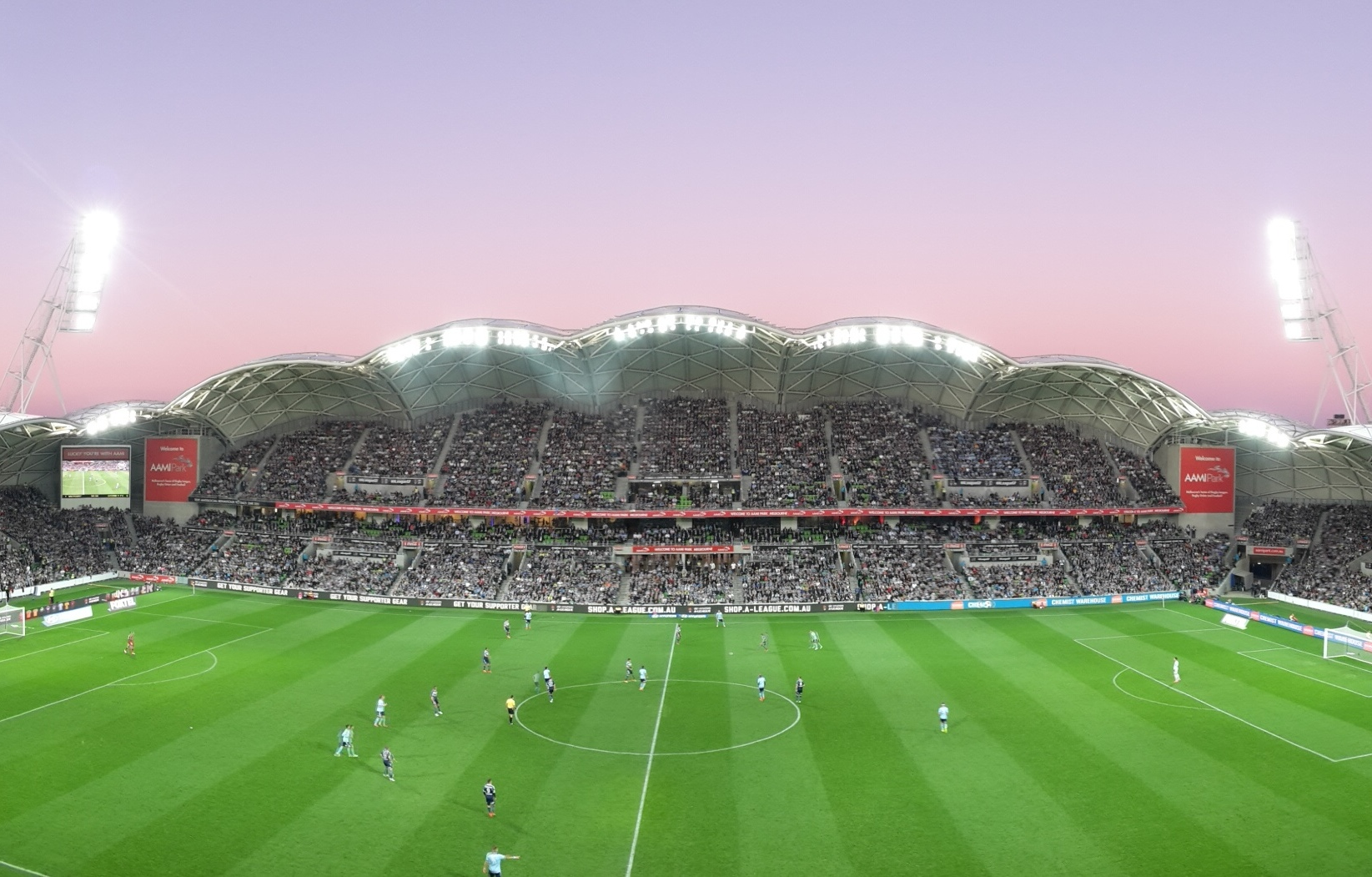
Soccer: A-League Men at AAMI Park, Victoria

Four major football codes are major spectator sports in Australia and are played at some level in almost all states and territories

Australia is unique among major sporting markets in having four football codes competing for market share. The irony is that the two international games, football (soccer) and rugby union, are getting trounced by the two parochial codes, rugby league and Australian Rules, which are both fast and furious, and both built on deep tribal roots.

— Paul Sheehan, 2010

Football in Australia refers to numerous football codes which each have major shares of the mainstream sports market, media, broadcasting, professional athletes, financial performance and grassroots participation: Australian rules football, rugby league, rugby union and soccer (known in many other countries as "football"). There are four pre-eminent professional football competitions played in Australia: the Australian Football League (Australian rules), the National Rugby League (rugby league), Super Rugby (rugby union) and the A-League (soccer). Rugby league is the most watched sport in Australia based on television viewership, however, Australian rules football attracts larger live attendances. In the states of New South Wales and Queensland, rugby football (league and union) is overall the most watched and receives the most media coverage, especially the Rugby League State of Origin contested between the two states referred to as "Australian sport's greatest rivalry". In recent times, there has been an increase in popularity in Australian rules and corresponding decrease in popularity of rugby union in New South Wales and Queensland. Soccer, while extending its lead in participation rate, particularly in the large cities, and improving its performance at the FIFA World Cup and at the FIFA Women's World Cup, continues to attract the overall lowest attendance, as well as media and public interest, of the four codes.

In Australia, it is not unusual for football fans to follow or play more than one code of football and spectate major events from multiple different codes, though strong lifelong allegiances are evident in some where football cultures are most ingrained. Immigration to Australia and internal migration have had a significant effect on football followings in parts of Australia, and even have an influence on where Australians move.

Prior to the Federation of Australia, there was no dominant football code and football was played under a variety of rules since 1829. By the 1860s, Australian rules football and rugby became entrenched in Melbourne and Sydney, respectively. The first intercolonial football matches were being played by the 1870s and led to the formation of the first intercolonial governing bodies in Australian rules and rugby. Soccer or "British Association Football" was first introduced in the 1870s; although it has struggled against the full contact codes, it has increased in popularity since the 1890s. Women's soccer dominated female participation from the 1920s until recent times, when the organisation of Women's Australian rules saw it boom in popularity. Strong Australian regional rivalries have helped keep a regional football code divide in Australia, popularly known as the "Barassi Line", strong for generations. This divide was still strongly evident in the 1980s after the first national competitions became established. Rugby continued to dominate in Queensland and New South Wales and Australian rules football, while still being played throughout, dominated the rest of the country. Other traditional divisions have also continued to some extent, including rugby league and rugby union's class/socio economic division and soccer's dominance amongst some minority migrant communities. Most attempts to move outside these traditional boundaries have been largely unsuccessful.

The different codes attract different participation levels that reflect historical trends. Soccer, nationally, has substantially more participants than any other code, and is particularly popular with junior participants. However, Australian rules has higher participation rates in outback Australia, amongst indigenous communities and women.

Australia competes internationally in almost all football codes with national football teams. Nationally the most popular are the "Matildas" & "Socceroos" (soccer), the "Wallabies" (rugby union) and "Kangaroos" (rugby league).

== Terminology ==
In Australia, "football" may refer to any of several popular codes. These include Australian rules football, rugby league, rugby union and association football.

As is the case in the United States and Canada, association football has traditionally been referred to in Australia as "soccer". Historically, the sport has been referred to as association football, English association football, British association rules and British football. It is also sometimes referred to in the media as "the round ball game" and "the world game" (the latter giving its name to a soccer television show).

Australian rules football can be referred to as Australian football (the official name of the sport), Aussie rules, football or footy (particularly in Victoria, South Australia, Western Australia and Tasmania). In other states (Queensland, New South Wales and the Australian Capital Territory) it is often referred to as "AFL" (the AFL markets the sport under the name of its premier competition in these areas). Historically, the sport outside of Victoria has been referred to as Victorian rules, the Victorian game and association football (after its first intercolonial governing body, the Victorian Football Association).

Rugby league can be referred to as league, footy, football, league football, NRL or rugby.

Rugby union can be referred to as union, rugby football, football, footy or rugby.

The earliest-established clubs in each of the three non-soccer codes are all named "FC" (Football Club), including Melbourne FC and Geelong FC in Australian rules, Sydney University FC and Wallaroo FC in rugby union, and South Sydney DRLFC in rugby league.

== National governing bodies and competitions ==
All the major football codes are represented by national governing bodies which run the major competitions and game development initiatives in the country.

Major codes of football in Australia
Football code	Australian Overview	Main governing body	National club competition/s	National representative competition/s	Semi-national competition/s	Variants and participation sports
Australian rules	Australian rules football in Australia	AFL Commission	Australian Football League, AFL Women's	AFL Under 19 Championships, AFL Women's Under 18 Championships	Victorian Football League	Auskick, AFL9s, AFL Masters, Women's Australian rules
Rugby league	Rugby League in Australia	Australian Rugby League Commission	National Rugby League, NRLW	—N/a	Rugby League State of Origin, Affiliated States Championship	Touch football, Tag football
Association football	Soccer in Australia	Football Australia	A-League Men, A-League Women, Australia Cup	—N/a	—N/a	Futsal
Rugby union	Rugby union in Australia	Rugby Australia	Super Rugby AU, Super W	Super Rugby AU, Super W	—N/a	Rugby Sevens, Touch rugby, Women's rugby

Minor codes of football in Australia
Football code	Australian Overview	Main governing body	National competition/s
Gridiron	Gridiron in Australia	Gridiron Australia	Australian Gridiron League
Gaelic football	Gaelic football in Australia	Australasia GAA	Australasian Championships

The timeline below outlines the history and evolution of the governing bodies and the respective major competitions of each code.

== National club competitions ==
Although contemporary professional competitions are represented by clubs from multiple states and national governing bodies, there are currently no truly national club competitions with clubs in all states due to the exclusion of Tasmania. This may change as the two competitions that are closest to national competitions (AFL/AFLW and A-League/W-League) expand to include Tasmania (see: Tasmanian AFL bid and Tasmanian A-League bid). A truly national competition would include territories as well. The AFL has to date declined to award licenses to bids for proposed clubs in the ACT and Northern Territory, while the A-League has declined bids from the ACT (see Canberra A-League Bid).

=== Men's ===
Table below shows current fully professional clubs numbers in men's senior competitions for the big four football codes in each state and territory as at 2021 in the most populous states. This list includes full season competitions only (including finals systems) and excludes shorter season and knock-out type competitions. Some codes have second tier leagues, or reserves competitions with semi-professional teams competing in other state/territories (for example the Victorian Football League) however there are currently no such competitions which are national. This does not give a breakdown of metropolitan and regional clubs. TV viewership and participation numbers are generally determined by the number of clubs in the big 3 states: New South Wales, Victoria and Queensland.

Football Code and National Competition			Professional clubs (by State)						Professional clubs (by Territory)	
Football code	Competition	Total	NSW	VIC	QLD	WA	SA	TAS	ACT	NT
Australian rules	AFL	18	2	10	2	2	2	-	-	-
Rugby league	NRL	16	10	1	4	1	-	-	1	-
Soccer	A-League Men	10	5	2	1	1	1	-	-	-
Rugby union	Super Rugby	4	1	1	1	1	-	-	1	-

Football Code		Representative team (by State)						Representative team (by Territory)	
Football code	Highest Competition	NSW	VIC	QLD	WA	SA	TAS	ACT	NT
Rugby union	Super Rugby	New South Wales Waratahs (Super Rugby)	Victoria (NRC Division 2)	Queensland Reds (Super Rugby )	Western Force (Super Rugby)	South Australia (NRC Division 2)	Tasmania (NRC Division 2)	ACT Brumbies (Super Rugby)	Northern Territory (NRC Division 2)
Rugby league	Rugby League State of Origin	New South Wales		Queensland					
Australian rules	AFL Origin	New South Wales	Victoria	Queensland	Western Australia	South Australia	Tasmania	Australian Capital Territory	Northern Territory
Soccer	-	-	-	-	-	-	-	-	-

=== Women's ===
Table below shows current semi-professional clubs numbers in women's senior competitions for the big four football codes in each state and territory as at 2021 in the most populous states.

Football Code and National Competition			Professional teams (by State)						Professional teams (by Territory)	
Football code	Competition	Total	NSW	VIC	QLD	WA	SA	TAS	ACT	NT
Australian rules	AFLW	18	2	10	2	2	2	-	-	-
Soccer	A-League Women	10	4	2	1	1	1	-	1	-
Rugby league	NRLW	10	6	-	3	-	-	-	1	-
Rugby union	Super W	5	1	1	1	1	-	-	1	-

== National audience ==
Australian sport fans have historically attended events in large numbers, dating back to the country's early history. An early football game played in Melbourne in 1858 had 2,000 spectators. Australian sport fans have behaved unruly at times, with police being required at football games dating back to the 1860s. By 1897, tens of thousands of spectators attended an early Australian rules football match at a time when top level soccer matches in England would draw six thousand fans. A finals match between the Carlton Football Club and Collingwood in 1938 drew 96,834 fans. In 1909, at a time when rugby union had not yet become professionalised, 52,000 people in Sydney attended a game between New South Wales and New Zealand. The spectators accounted for 10% of the total population of Sydney at the time. In 2000 during the Bledisloe cup opener, rugby union drew its largest ever crowd in Australia for what many have since labelled as "the greatest Test ever played" with 109,874 crowding into stadium Australia. The 1914 Great Britain Lions tour of Australia and New Zealand included a match in Melbourne, the first rugby league game to be played in Victoria. The match between England and New South Wales drew 12,000 spectators.

Total average game attendance for the Australian Football League and the National Rugby League increased between 1970 and 2000, with the AFL going from an average attendance of 24,344 people per match in 1970 to 27,325 by 1980 to 25,238 in 1990 and 34,094 by 2000. The National Rugby League had an average per game attendance of 11,990 in 1970, saw a decrease in 1980 to 10,860 but increased to 12,073 by 1990 and improved on that to 14,043 by 2000.

Australian Bureau of Statistics survey Spectator Attendance at Sporting Events, 2009–10 reported the following findings regarding female attendance at football sporting events. Survey found that an estimated 3.3 million females attended one or more sporting events as spectators. This represented 37% of females aged 15 years and over in Australia and 54% of females aged 15–17 years. The top football sports in attendance were: Australian rules football (1,171,100), rugby league (594,700), soccer (354,800), and rugby union (209,300).

=== Men's ===
==== Broadcast audience ====
Football code	Current National League	National television audience	Grand Final television viewers
Rugby league	NRL	153.7 million (2024)	5.34 million (2024)
Australian rules	AFL	140.3 million (2024)	6.09 million (2024)
Rugby union	Super Rugby		1.3 million (2020)
Soccer	A-league		200,000 (2020)

==== Attendance ====
Football code	Current National League	Total attendance	Average attendance
Australian rules	AFL	8,243,908 (2024)	38,344 (2024)
Rugby league	NRL	4,265,299 (2024)	20,605 (2024)
Soccer	A-league	1,115,048 (2022–23)	7,544 (2022–23)
Rugby union	Super Rugby	269,884 (2025)	12,267 (2025)

==== Attendance records ====
Record attendances are sometimes an indication of each code's popularity but not always, as it can be restricted by capacity of the state/territory's available stadiums, however typically regular demand drives the requirement for larger stadiums.

		State record						Territory record	
Football code	National record	(New South Wales) NSW	(Victoria (state)) VIC	(Queensland) QLD	(Western Australia) WA	(South Australia) SA	(Tasmania) TAS	(Australian Capital Territory) ACT	(Northern Territory) NT
Australian rules	121,696	72,393	121,696	37,478	61,118	66,987	24,968	14,974	17,500
Rugby union	109,874	109,874	90,119	52,499	61,241	36,366	15,457	28,753	4,000
Rugby league	107,999	107,999	91,671	52,540	59,721	48,613	11,752	26,476	13,473
Soccer	104,098	104,098	99,382	51,153	56,371	53,008	8,061	20,032	3,175
Gridiron	100,021	73,900	100,021						

=== Women's ===
==== Broadcast audience ====
The Matildas vs England semi-final in the 2023 FIFA Women's World Cup set the record television audience for a sports program in Australia, 11.15 million. AFLW's free to air television audience fell from an average of 180,000 per game to 53,000 in 2022, with total viewership falling by 70%.

Football code	Current National League	National television audience	Grand Final television viewers
Australian rules	AFLW	2,622,000 (2020)	355,000 (2022)
Soccer	W-League	879,000 (2020)	
Rugby league	NRLW		264,000 (2022)
Rugby union	Super W		

==== Attendance ====
Note: NRLW does not currently publish standalone attendance figures as the majority of matches are still NRL double-headers, with the first standalone fixtures held in 2023 including a small percentage of matches. In 2023, NRLW standalone matches attracted an average of 2,252 per match, just short of the AFLW's 2,853. AFLW attendance in 2023 despite growing since the COVID-19 pandemic was down 60% on its first season.

In April 2024, the 2023–24 A-League Women season set the record for the most attended season of any women's sport in Australian history, with the season recording a total attendance of 284,551 on 15 April 2024, and finishing with a final total attendance of 312,199.

Football code	Current National League	Season	Total attendance	Average attendance
Soccer	A-League Women	2023–24	312,199	2,248
Australian rules	AFLW	2023	284,122	2,870
Rugby league	NRLW	2023	56,379	2,819
Rugby union	Super W			

==== Attendance records ====
Note that many women's matches are played as curtain-raisers or multi-headers (most women's AFL matches prior to 2017 AFLW season; all NRL Women's premiership and State of Origin matches prior to 2022 and Rugby's Wallaroos vs New Zealand match) - only stand alone attendances are counted. Note that prior to 2021 there was free entry to AFLW matches.

		State record						Territory record	
Football code	National record	(New South Wales) NSW	(Victoria (state)) VIC	(Queensland) QLD	(Western Australia) WA	(South Australia) SA	(Tasmania) TAS	(Australian Capital Territory) ACT	(Northern Territory) NT
Soccer	76,798	76,798	54,120	49,461	59,155	52,912	2,050	2,229	
Australian rules	53,034	9,017	24,568	15,610	41,975	53,034	3,123	6,460	5,100
Rugby league	30,000	30,000		26,022				11,321	
Rugby union	7,055			7,055					

== Participation ==
=== Establishment and participation by state/territory ===
The following gives a summary of each football code by state/territory, along with foundation dates and summaries. (Some Australian colonies, early in their history, for example South Australia and Tasmania), had football competitions and clubs as early as the 1840s but played what are now defunct codes and later adopted one of the existing codes.) This also includes the earliest dates for areas where a code was dormant for long periods of time (such as Australian rules in New South Wales and Queensland and rugby in Tasmania). Highlighted dates for the earliest code established in that territory (not an indication of current popularity). Although rugby league began in 1908, as a breakaway from rugby union, with most of its following initially coming from that code.

		State establishment year						Territory establishment year	
Football code	National	(New South Wales) NSW	(Victoria (state)) VIC	(Queensland) QLD	(Western Australia) WA	(South Australia) SA	(Tasmania) TAS	(Australian Capital Territory) ACT	(Northern Territory) NT
Australian rules	1859	1866	1859	1866	1868	1877	1879	1911	1916
Rugby union	1863	1863	1878	1876	1868	1932	1933	1907	1916
Soccer	1867	1880	1883	1867	1896	1880	1879	1910	1911
Rugby league	1907	1907	1923	1909	1948	1948	1953	1928	1920

=== Participation and regional variation ===
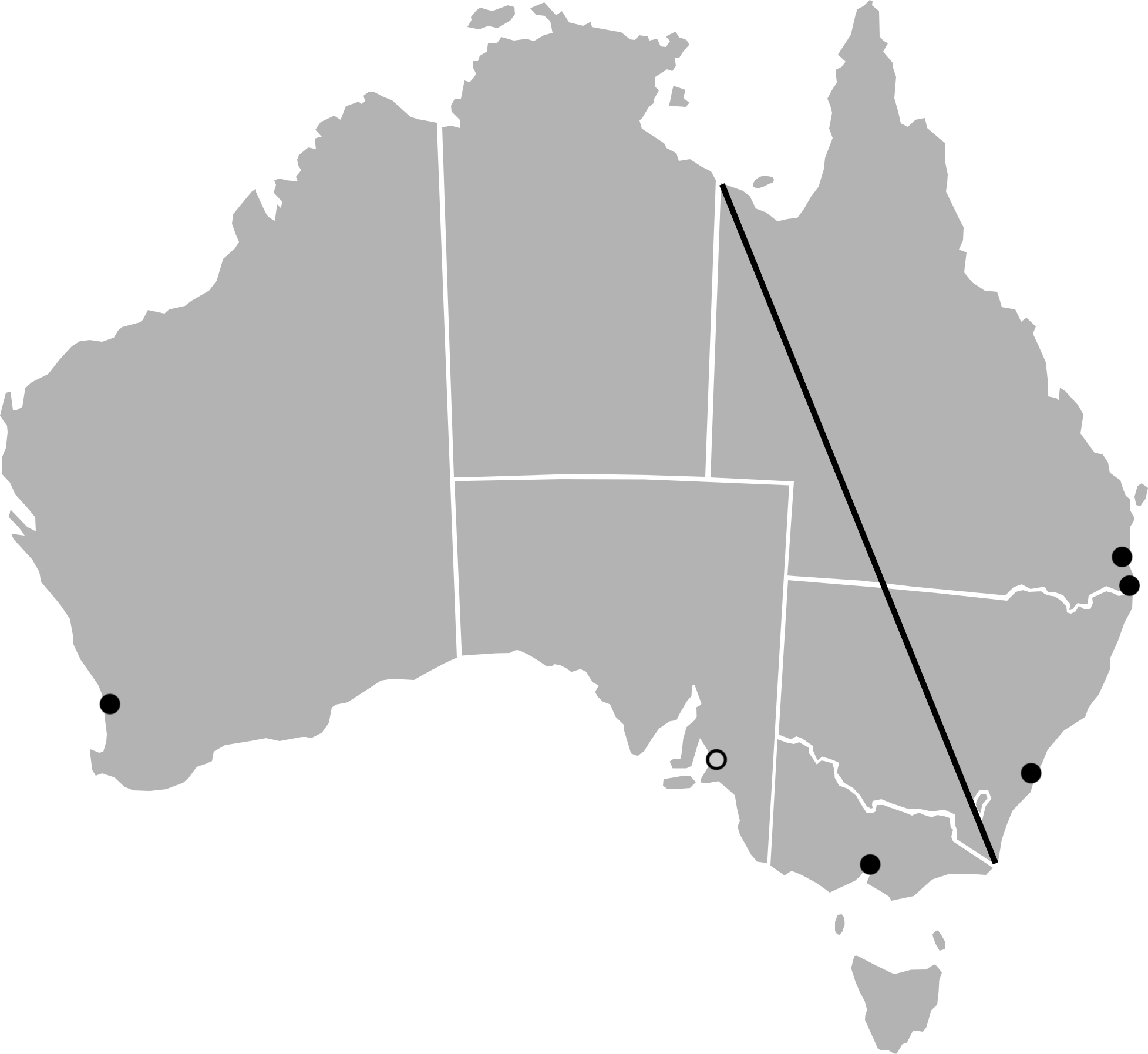
The "Barassi Line", as proposed by Ian Turner in 1978. The line divides the regions where Australian rules football (south and southwest) and rugby league (northeast) are the most popular football codes. Dots mark the locations of cities with at least one professional club that deviates from the Barassi Line; hollow dots mark the locations of cities that formerly had a professional club.

Recent surveys have shown that while the number of football participants has more than doubled in Australia with more than 3.1 million Australians participating in one of the four major football codes in 2019, the overall participation rate in outdoor football codes has declined slightly over the course of the 2010s. Australian Bureau of Statistics figures from 2011 which showed that in 2009 and 2010, 1.2 million Australians over the age of fifteen participated in one football code or another. Outdoor soccer and Australian rules football were the most popular codes played by Australian children in 2009, with 13% and 8.6% participation total respectively.

Soccer has the highest participation rate in every state and territory with the highest participation nationally in New South Wales and the Australian Capital Territory, where more than 7% of the population regularly play it. Participation in soccer follows most closely Australia's demographic distribution being strongest in the major cities (6%) with more than 3 in 4 of its players found in Sydney, Melbourne or Brisbane. In remote areas, Australian rules football (5.7%) and rugby league (2.4%) dominate. Almost 90% of all the rugby football players can be found in New South Wales and Queensland.

Since the 2010s the strongest participation growth has been posted by soccer which has grown its national marketshare through large participation increases in the eastern states of New South Wales, Queensland and the ACT. Rugby league has grown its hold in New South Wales and strengthened its position in the Australian Capital Territory as well as its participation across the Barassi Line in Victoria and Western Australia. Rugby union has defied a downward national trend posting strong growth in Tasmania and the Australian Capital Territory, areas where Australian rules football has been declining. Australian rules football outgrew rugby union in New South Wales and Queensland between 2016 and 2019 however it has since stagnated while experiencing a sharp decline in South Australia and Tasmania with recent growth limited to its traditional strongholds of Victoria and Western Australia.

		State participation rate						Territory participation rate	
Football code	National rate	(New South Wales) NSW	(Victoria (state)) VIC	(Queensland) QLD	(Western Australia) WA	(South Australia) SA	(Tasmania) TAS	(Australian Capital Territory) ACT	(Northern Territory) NT
Soccer	6.9	7.0	4.6	5.0	4.8	3.9	4.4	7.3	5.1
Australian rules	3.6	1.1	4.3	1.3	4.2	4.8	3.3	2.4	5.0
Rugby league	1.2	1.2	0.2	1.7	0.3	0.2	0.0	0.3	2.1
Rugby union	0.5	0.9	0.2	1.1	0.5	0.3	0.3	0.8	1.6

		State players						Territory players	
Football code	National players	(New South Wales) NSW	(Victoria (state)) VIC	(Queensland) QLD	(Western Australia) WA	(South Australia) SA	(Tasmania) TAS	(Australian Capital Territory) ACT	(Northern Territory) NT
Soccer	1,138,466	468,148	241,067	207,398	109,513	59,387	18,583	24,453	9,917
Australian rules	555,629	70,292	229,861	56,502	95,316	70,463	14,893	8,281	10,021
Rugby league	175,290	82,397	9,676	66,913	8,889	2,735	10	1,063	3,607
Rugby union	138,075	59,259	11,691	43,743	12,151	3,972	1,394	3,028	2,837
American football	15,678	4,303	3,932	2,800	2,740	1,330	185	312	75
Gaelic football	2,524	586	1,014	280	451	193	0	0	0

		State clubs						Territory clubs	
Football code	National clubs	(New South Wales) NSW	(Victoria (state)) VIC	(Queensland) QLD	(Western Australia) WA	(South Australia) SA	(Tasmania) TAS	(Australian Capital Territory) ACT	(Northern Territory) NT
Australian rules	2,672	267	1,242	130	546	367	100	15	210
Soccer	2,200	139	199	300	36	29	30	10	13
Rugby league	1,125	500	13	560	11	11	0	9	15
Rugby union	848	100	25	200	35	14	13	7	4

There was historically a regional variation in the spread of Australian rules football and rugby: the Barassi Line is a rough dividing line between areas where Australia rules is most popular and where rugby union and rugby league are most popular. Rugby league participation was historically high in New South Wales and Queensland, and both rugby league and rugby union continue to be popular in these states. Some of the relative popularity of one football code over another in terms of participation was a result of media influence on coverage of the two major professional games, Rugby league and Australian rules football. This influence and their media market desires drove some of the regional patterns for these codes.

Football in Australia has also been historically drawn across class and ethnic lines. For example soccer participation was for many years confined to Australia's newly arriving European ethnic groups. Most rugby union players are developed at private schools with it having the notable reputation of a sport for the privileged.

=== Indigenous ===
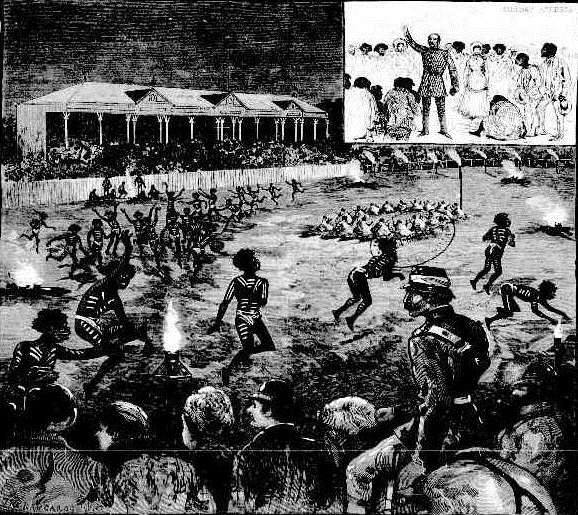
Indigenous Australian football teams perform a corroboree at the Adelaide Oval in May 1885

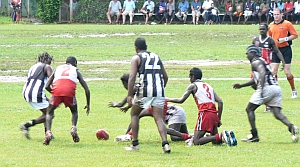
Australian rules football is popular among Indigenous communities

Australian rules football has traditionally been one of the most popular football codes played by Australia's Indigenous community With more than 100,000 players in 2021, it has more than twice as many Indigenous participants as any other code. Prior to European settlement, Indigenous men and women played a similar game called Marngrook. Records of indigenous participation in Victoria's major clubs date back to the early decades of the game in Victoria. Indigenous pioneers include Harry Hewitt, Jimmy Melbourne, Joe Johnson, Douglas Nicholls and Graham Farmer. 11% of Australian Football League players identified themselves as Indigenous Australians in 2011. The Brownlow Medal, the most prestigious individual best and fairest award has been awarded to Gavin Wanganeen and Adam Goodes (twice), while Maddy Prespakis and Ally Anderson have been named AFL Women's best and fairest. All-indigenous sides have been documented as early the turn of the 19th Century and the first representative teams began playing matches after World War II. Indigenous Australia has been represented by the senior Indigenous All-Stars (founded 1973 to compete against Papua New Guinea) who have defeated numerous AFL clubs and the Flying Boomerangs junior team (founded 1973) who have competed internationally.

The popularity of soccer began to grow in the Aboriginal and Torres Strait Islander communities in the 2000s with more than 40,000 participants in 2021. One of the first Indigenous Australians to make the national team was John Kundereri Moriarty, who was supposed to tour with the team in 1961 but the national federation was unable to hold the tour as they were facing FIFA sanctions at the time. Other notable indigenous soccer players included Charlie Perkins who played and coached Pan-Hellenic and Harry Williams who was a member of the Australian team at the 1974 FIFA World Cup.

Rugby league has around 30,000 indigenous participants in 2021. 12 percent of NRL-contracted players are Indigenous compared with the just 2.8 percent of Australians who identify as having Aboriginal heritage according to the latest Census in 2016. And on top of that, 17 percent of grassroots players are Indigenous. In 1944, the first Aboriginal rugby league club was founded in Redfern, New South Wales the Redfern All Blacks. The first All Indigenous Australian National Rugby League team was named in 2009. Arthur Beetson became the first indigenous Australian to captain the national team of any football code when in 1973 he was selected to lead the Australian rugby league team.

Rugby union too has a rich history of Aboriginal participation with notable indigenous athletes such as the Ella brothers, Mark, Gary and Glen as well as Kurtley Beale all past members of the Wallabies.

=== Female ===
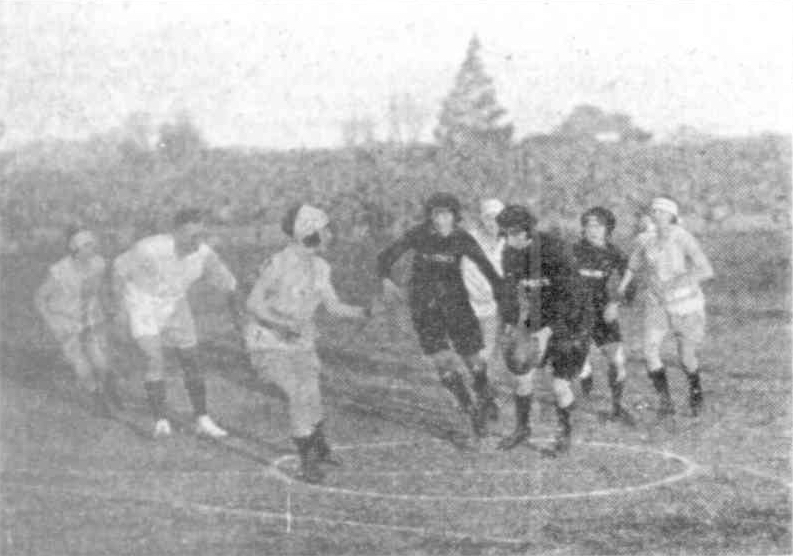
In 1929 a Women's Australian rules football match played at Adelaide Oval attracted a record 41,000 spectators.

Among women, Australian rules football is by far the most participated code, followed by soccer, rugby union and rugby league.

Women's Australian rules has exploded since the advent of the national AFLW competition. In 2017, a record number of 463,364 women were playing Australian rules football across the nation, making up 30% of all participants and overtaking women's soccer for the first time in history. The number of female Australian rules football teams reached 1,690 nationally, a huge 76% increase on the previous year In 2018 and 2019, nationally there were 156,893 registered women's and girls soccer participants 63,443 female rugby union participants and 16,337 female rugby league participants.

There are national professional competitions for women including the AFLW (Australian rules football), A-League Women (soccer), Super W (rugby union), NRLW (Rugby league) competitions and national women's teams for each of the codes.

== Safety ==
The issue of safety around football in Australia is driven by the situation in American sport. Concussions are a problem for all four major football codes in Australia. A summit was held by leadership in the big four professional football leagues to address these issues in 2011.

In Brisbane, Queensland in 1980, 63% of all sport related injuries were as a result of one of the four major football codes. 10.2% of football players in one medical study had a head or neck injury. The most common injury for an Australian rules football player is a lower limb injury, accounting for about 60% of all injuries. In Australian rules football, injuries as a result of contact occurred 71% of the time compared to other causes of injury.

== History of football codes in Australia ==
Forms of football were played prior to European colonization, most notably the indigenous game known as Marn Grook among the Wurundjeri. The earliest historical observations date to the Australia's convict colonial period. It is not clear how long these traditional games were played or how widespread they were practiced elsewhere on the continent.

With the arrival of Europeans, forms of football were played very early on in the Australian colonies with matches being played by 1829 in the Colony of New South Wales at Sydney, in Van Diemen's Land at Hobart and the Port Phillip District at Melbourne by 1840, the Colony of South Australia at Adelaide by 1843, and the Colony of Queensland at Brisbane by 1849. Most of these early games took part at local festivals and the rules under which they played (if any) not recorded. However hacking shins was a common practice and as such some are considered to have been comparable to mob football.

Immigrants from England brought with them an awareness particularly of Rugby football (codified 1845) as well as Eton football (codified 1847) and Harrow football (codified 1858), Cambridge rules (codified 1856) and a variety of other games.While the playing of football in England outside of the schools had been by the introduction of the Gaming Act 1845 relieved of any remaining doubt of it no longer being subject to a ban under King Henry VIII and the Unlawful Games Act 1541, the various colonial governments across Australia left the question unattended until the 20th century.

Accounts from the Colony of Tasmania of football in the 1850s indicate that matches were played under mostly English public school football games rules, but particularly Rugby, Eton and Harrow rules.The colony had its own unique football code until in the early 1880s the Victorian rules became dominant.

In the Colony of South Australia from 1854 a version of Harrow football was also being played. The rules under which the Old Adelaide Football Club played in 1860, while published, are now lost, however many assume that they were also along the lines of Harrow. Harrow rules at the time featured the absence of an 'off-side', kicking from the hand, marking (fair catch), carrying the ball in hand, tackling or shoulder charging the player with the ball and kicking through upright goals to score, all elements of South Australia's most popular code to this day.

In the Colony of Victoria the merits of these different schools and their footballing traditions were also known on the Victorian goldfields in 1858 particularly the Cambridge rules which were popular. Most notably, 1856 Cambridge laws permitted players to catch the ball, with a free kick awarded for a fair catch. Accounts of early football in Victoria in the 1850s was that football was particularly popular on the goldfields with the English playing school football, Scottish immigrants played a game similar to soccer and Irish immigrants playing a game of high punt kicking. The use of Cambridge and Harrow rules meant that the forms of football being played in Victoria, South Australia and to a lesser extent Tasmania would have appeared relatively familiar in comparison to rugby.

By 1858 a handful of Melbourne clubs, mostly schools, were also experimenting with public school football, particularly rugby, though concerns were growing about its suitability for adults. Among the rugby dissenters in Melbourne were Tom Wills, (himself a rugby player educated at the Rugby School), William Hammersley and J. B. Thompson who would form Australia's oldest football club, the Melbourne Football Club and begin to popularise a new Australian code. The Melbourne rules of football (later called Victorian rules and now Australian rules) were first codified and played in 1859. The current Australian Football League features some of the earliest football clubs in the country, Melbourne Football Club and Geelong Football Club (founded 1859), these remain Australia's longest running football clubs. By 1864 the code grew rapidly and there were as many as a dozen clubs throughout Victoria.

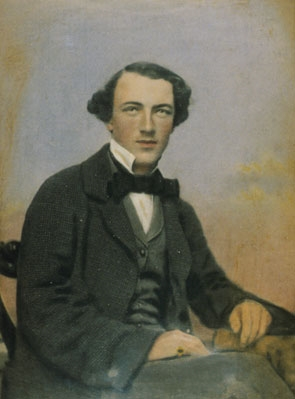
New South Welshman Tom Wills co-wrote Melbourne Football Club's first laws.

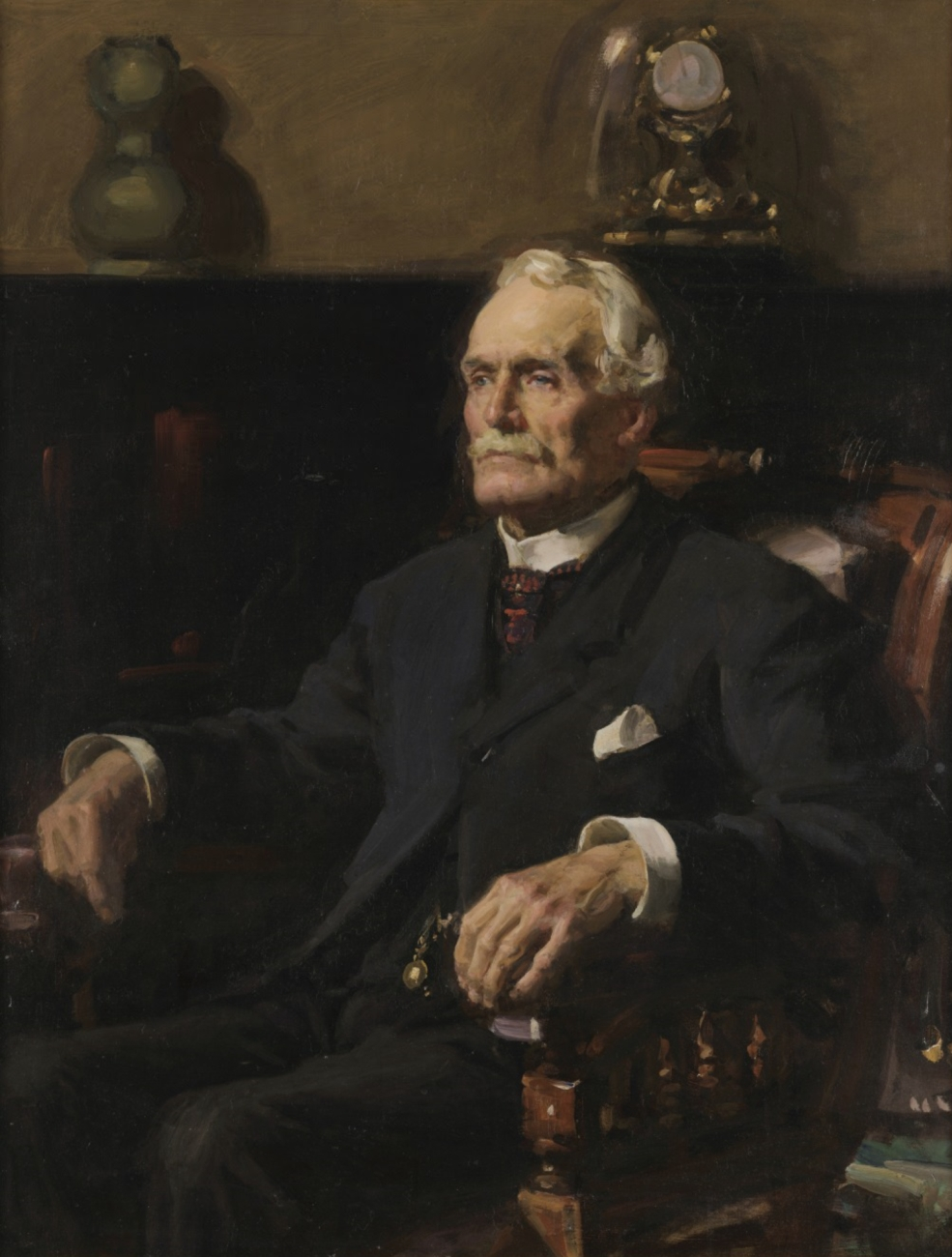
Wills' cousin H. C. A. Harrison was pivotal in standardising the Victorian rules leading to its expansion across Australia

Club football in New South Wales first appeared between 1865 involving a few fledgling Sydney clubs and a team from the Sydney University, who began to play each other under Victorian rules. However the city was generally indifferent to football of any kind, and by 1869 interest had reduced to just two games under hybrid football rules against a visiting warship. Competition finally began in earnest after the founding of Wallaroo FC in Sydney in 1870, the colony's first club dedicated to rugby rules. Led by the Wallaroo FC the existing clubs and schools in 1874 formed the Southern Rugby Football Union (now the NSWRU), where they bound themselves to the new rugby union laws of London's Rugby Football Union and banned the playing of any other codes. Victorian rules though continued to find support in the colony's border towns and regions which were closer to Melbourne and Adelaide.

In 1866, the Colony of Queensland adopted Australian rules football and by the 1870s, it was the most popular code of football. After news that Sydney had chosen rugby, Brisbane clubs soon began to follow, though the code continued to co-exist with Victorian rules for some time. By 1879 rugby was also the dominant form of football in Perth though it too co-existed with Victorian rules.

Australian rules football was for a time was only dominant in Victoria, however the first intercolonial between Victoria vs South Australia (1879) saw the colonies of South Australia and Tasmania formally adopt it, helping them form the longest surviving competitions and governing bodies, the South Australian Football Association and the Victorian Football Association (VFA).

Soccer was also being played in Australia by the mid 1870s. However it became established in Sydney in 1880 with the founding of the first club, the Wanderers.

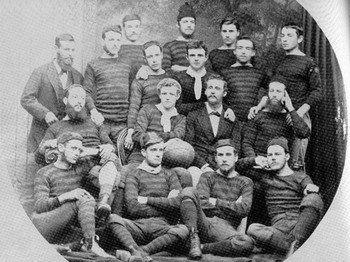
Brisbane Football Club in 1879, Queensland's first football club formed in 1866 to play Australian rules football but experimented with soccer and rugby in its early years

In 1884, rugby challenged Australian for its primacy in Queensland as the popularity of rugby intercolonials against New South Wales rose.The following year on the other side of the continent in the Colony of Western Australia, Australian rules football began challenging rugby in popularity culminating in the formation of the popular West Australian Football League (and remains the colony's preferred sport to this day). By this time Australian rules football had permanently established itself in all of the Australian colonies including short lived governing bodies in New South Wales (NSWFA) and Queensland (QFA). The collapse of these two bodies in the 1890s saw rugby union gain a firm stronghold in these states. The major exception was the Riverina area of New South Wales close to the Victorian border, and closer to Melbourne than Sydney.

Like rugby, soccer also grew through the 1880s with the establishment of strong governing bodies. In 1884, Victoria formed its own association, the Anglo-Australian Football Association (now Football Victoria), as did Queensland, in the Anglo-Queensland Football Association (now, Football Queensland), and Northern New South Wales, in the Northern District British Football Association (now, Northern New South Wales Football). In 1896, the Western Australian Soccer Football Association was formed. In 1900, a Tasmanian association was formed, and later, the South Australian British Football Association was formed in 1902.

In 1897 the Victorian Football League formed as a breakaway from the VFA, the league would exert significant influence and became the country's most significant nationally in terms of interest and attendance.

Following Federation of Australia in 1903 Australian rules football experienced a national revival with the formation of the NSW Australian Football Association (NSWAFA) and Queensland Football League (QFL) which have continued to the present day. The nationalisation of the game led to the first national governing body, the Australasian Football Council and the first national carnival in 1908.

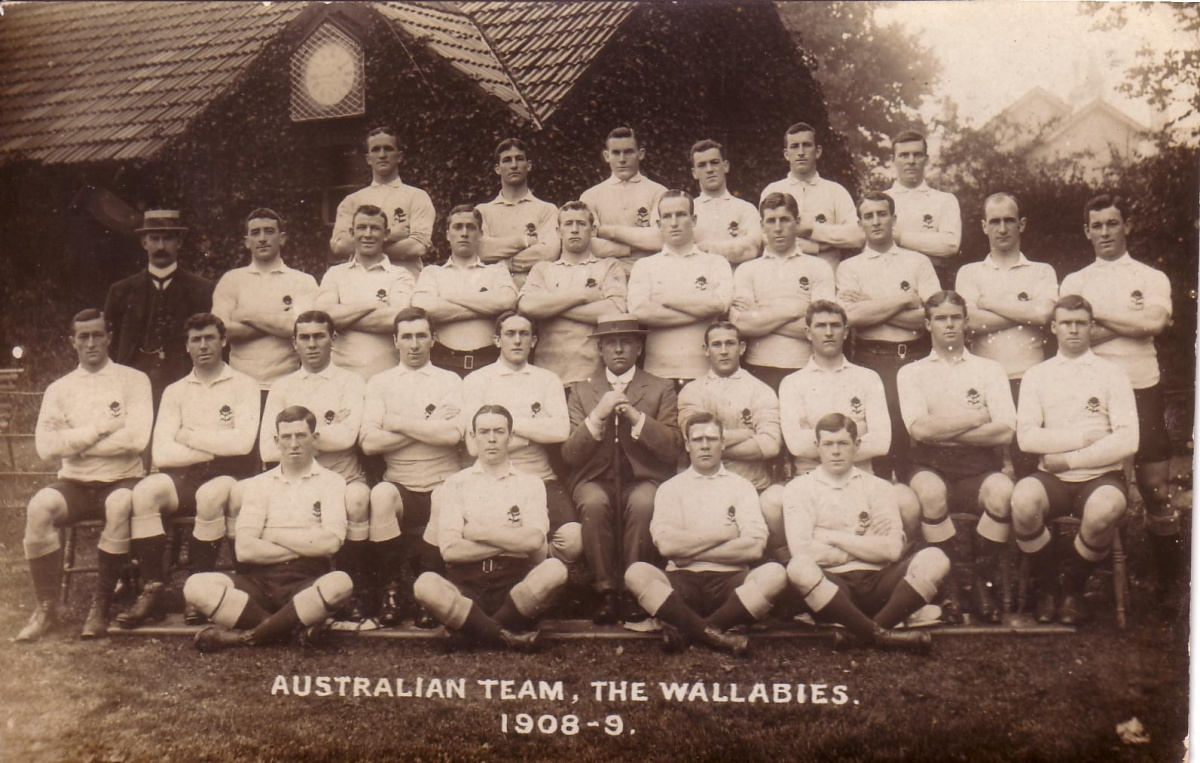
The 1908 Wallabies, Australia's first Olympic football team.

In 1914 and 1915 an amalgamation of rugby league and Australian rules football was considered and trialled.

After the war, Australian rules football became popular in both the Northern Territory and Australian Capital Territory.

In 1922, a committee in Australia investigated the benefits of physical education for girls. They came up with several recommendations regarding what sports were and were not appropriate for girls to play based on the level of fitness required. Football was completely medically inappropriate for girls to play. It was medically appropriate for all girls to be able to participate in, so long as they were not done in an overly competitive manner, swimming, rowing, cycling and horseback riding.

In 1928 Australia national rugby league team adopted the national colours of green and gold for the first time, having previously used blue and maroon, making the Kangaroos the first national football team of any code to do so. All others have adopted the colours since.

During the 1930s, rugby league, which had gone professional, began to overtake rugby union in popularity in Queensland, with the league being the dominant spectator code by 1937.

The 1951 French rugby league tour of Australia and New Zealand saw the first tour of Australia by a French football team of any code.

The 1954 Rugby League World Cup saw the first time that any Australia national football team participated in a World Cup tournament. The Australian rugby league team then won the cup in the following tournament in 1957 which was held in Australia. This was also the first World Cup tournament for any code of football to be hosted in the country.

The regional football code divide in Australia was still present in the 1980s, with rugby league being the dominant code in Queensland and New South Wales while Australian rules football dominated in the rest of the country. When codes went outside of their traditional geographic home, they had little success in gaining new fans and participants. During the 1980s and 1990s both Australian rules and rugby league's major peak governing bodies changed their names to reflect a more nation-wide approach and added expansion teams outside their traditional areas. While the VFL attempted to expand into Sydney, Australian rules football lost its dominance in the ACT in 1982 to rugby league, and became a minor sport in both places.

During the 1990s, soccer faced a challenge in attracting youth players because of the ethnic nature of the sport at the highest levels of national competition. The sport's governing body made an effort to make the game less ethnically oriented. At the same time, rival football codes were intentionally trying to bring in ethnic participants in order to expand their youth playing base.

73,811 people attended a gridiron National Football League game between the Denver Broncos and San Diego Chargers at ANZ Stadium in Sydney in 1999. In March 1999, 104,000 fans attended a double header match in the National Rugby League at Stadium Australia four days after the venue formally opened.

In 2006, both Sydney's and Melbourne's grand finals featured teams from interstate, reflecting the shift in professional football in Australia.

In the late 2000s, Karmichael Hunt made history by becoming the first professional footballer to change codes from rugby league to rugby union to Australian rules football.

The COVID-19 pandemic in Australia had an immense effect on both Australian rules football and rugby league, causing the two code's flagship events to leave their traditional host cities for the first time. Despite a contract with the Melbourne Cricket Ground until 2059, the AFL was forced to relocate the 2020 AFL Grand Final to Brisbane. Likewise the 2021 NRL Grand Final was hosted by Brisbane due to pandemic restrictions. While the AFL followed some of the NRL's responses to the pandemic, continued restrictions in Victoria saw the 2021 AFL Grand Final hosted in Perth.

== History of National competition ==
=== Intercolonial and interstate representative competition ===
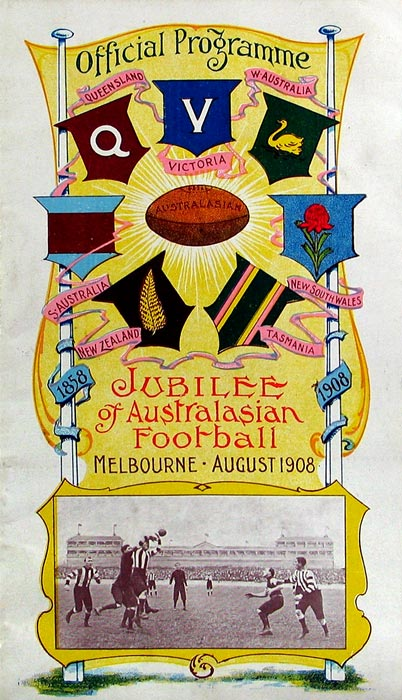
Australasian Football Jubilee Carnival (1908) was the first truly national football competition featuring teams from all Australian states

=== Inter-club competition ===
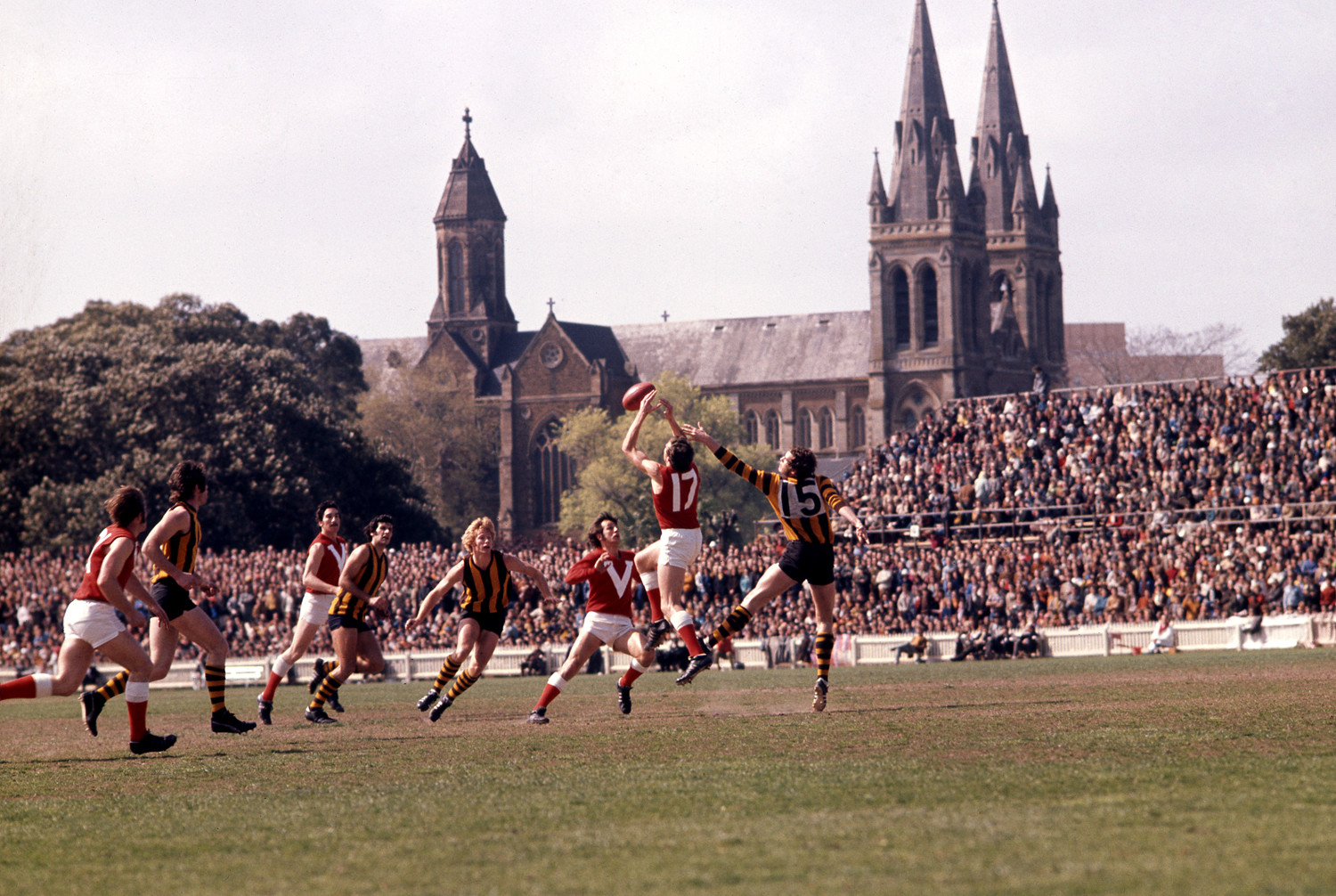
North Adelaide playing Hawthorn for the 1971 Championship of Australia at Adelaide Oval.

Football codes in Australia have aspired to national competition since prior to Federation of Australia, however the first truly national competitions began post Federation.

The Australian National Football Council (Australian rules football, founded 1906) was the first national governing body of any football code in Australia. The 1908 Melbourne Carnival was the first national representative competition involving all Australian states.

Prior to the modern national club football competitions, the first club competitions to feature clubs from more than two states were the Championship of Australia (1888-1975) (Australian rules football) and the Australia Cup (1962–1968) (soccer).

== Professionalism ==
The first professional football leagues in Australia were the Australian Football League, and the National Rugby League. Up until the late 2000s, there were three major football codes competing every weekend, which included Australian rules football, rugby league and rugby union. Unlike in Europe and the United States, professional clubs tend to be member run organisations instead of single owner, for profit businesses. The major football codes and professional leagues in the country all watch what their competition does in order to improve their own strategic picture in the Australian sporting landscape.

The Australian Football League saw money pour into the sport during the 1990s and 2000s. In 1993, total player payments were A$24 million but reached A$95 million by 2003. In 2007, the Australian Football League had the greatest financial stability of all the leagues in Australia with turnover of A$280 million, with the National Rugby League coming in second with A$120 million. At the same time, the AFL had highest level of corporate support with major national and international sponsors such as Air Emirates, Vodafone and Toyota. The AFL also beat the NRL in terms of geographic spread of their teams, with the AFL having teams in five states while the NRL had teams in three states in 2007. In 2007, the AFL was also spending A$30 million in youth player development compared to the NRL's A$15 million.

The National Rugby League traces its roots back to the 1890s when rugby league split from rugby union as the code went professional. By 1908, the professional New South Wales Rugby League was created. Collective player bargaining came to the professional game by 1982, with 95% of all played having joined the player union by 1991. Media access to the sport was one of the main reasons for a split in the sport in the 1990s that resulted in the New South Wales Rugby League facing competition from the Rupert Murdoch backed Super League, and the "Super League war" in 1997, which ended with the founding of the National Rugby League which had become a national, not state based, professional competition.

== Media coverage ==
There is a long history of television coverage of football in Australia. From 1957 to 2001, the Seven Network was the network for the Australian Football League. The only year that Seven was not the network for the league was in 1987 when the AFL was on the ABC. An exclusive deal was agreed upon by Seven in 1976 for a five-year deal worth A$3 million. Not all football television deals have been good. The deal made by Ten Network to the New South Wales Rugby League was worth considerably more, worth A$48 million for a five-year deal that also included broadcasting rights for the State of Origin and the Australia national rugby league team. This deal was terminated early because the network could not afford to pay out. The 1967 NSWRFL season's grand final became the first football grand final of any code to be televised live in Australia. The Nine Network had paid $5,000 for the broadcasting rights. Rugby league, which includes NRL, State of Origin and national team matches, had the highest aggregate television ratings of any sport in 2009 and 2010. Also, in a world first, the Nine Network broadcast free-to-air the first match of the 2010 State of Origin series live in 3D in New South Wales, Queensland and Victoria.

There are few Australian films which incorporate Australia's football codes. When football is depicted, the primary codes presented are Australian rules football and rugby. The sports often appear in the background in an attempt to make a film more authentically Australian. They include The Club. The film was based on a play produced in 1977, in Melbourne. It has been in the senior English syllabi for four Australian states for many years. The film was written by David Williamson, directed by Bruce Beresford and starring John Howard, Jack Thompson, Graham Kennedy and Frank Wilson. The Final Winter, released in 2007, is another Australian film incorporating football. It was directed by Brian Andrews and Jane Forrest and produced by Anthony Coffee, and Michelle Russell, while independently produced it is being distributed by Paramount Pictures. It was written by Matthew Nable who also starred as the lead role 'Grub' Henderson. The film, which earned praise from critics, focuses around Grub who is the captain of the Newtown Jets rugby league team in the early 1980s and his determination to stand for what rugby league traditionally stood for while dealing with his own identity crisis. Other Australian films incorporating football include Australian Rules and Footy Legends.

== National teams ==
National football teams include the Australia national soccer team ("Socceroos") who compete in FIFA World Cup / AFC Asian Cup / Olympic Football qualification and finals tournaments, the Australia national rugby union team ("Wallabies") who compete in The Rugby Championship and the World Cup while the Australian rugby league team ("Kangaroos") compete in various Ashes, ANZAC, Four Nations and World Cup rugby league test matches. The Australian Football League (Australia national team) and Gaelic Athletic Association (Ireland national team) compete in the International Rules Series under the hybrid code of International Rules Football.

Sport	Team	Nickname	Refs
American football	Men's	Australian Outbacks	
Australian rules football	Women's	AFL Women's All-Australian team	
	Men's under-17	AFL Academy	
	Women's under-17	AFLW Academy	
International rules football	Men's		
International rules football	Women's		
Rugby union	Men's	Wallabies	
Rugby union	Men's 7's	Australia	
Rugby union	Men's under-20	Junior Wallabies	
Rugby union	Men's under-18		
Rugby union	Women's	Wallaroos	
Rugby union	Women's 7's	Australia	
Rugby league	Men's	Kangaroos	
Rugby league	Men's Reserve	PM's XIII	
Rugby league	Men's under-20	Junior Kangaroos	
Rugby league	Men's under-18		
Rugby league	Women's	Jillaroos	
Rugby league	Wheelchair	Steelers (official), Wheelabies (unofficial)	
Soccer	Men's	Socceroos	
Soccer	Men's under-23	Olyroos	
Soccer	Men's under-20	Young Socceroos	
Soccer	Men's under-17	Joeys	
Soccer	Men's Futsal		
Soccer	Men's beach	Beach Socceroos	
Soccer	Men's Paralympic	Pararoos	
Soccer	Women's	Matildas	
Soccer	Women's under-20	Young Matildas	
Soccer	Women's under-17	Mini Matildas	
Soccer	Women's futsal		

== See also ==
- Sport in Australia
- American football in Australia
- Australian rules football in Australia
- Rugby league in Australia
- Rugby union in Australia
- Soccer in Australia
