= Barassi Line =

Imaginary geographic line of football codes in Australia

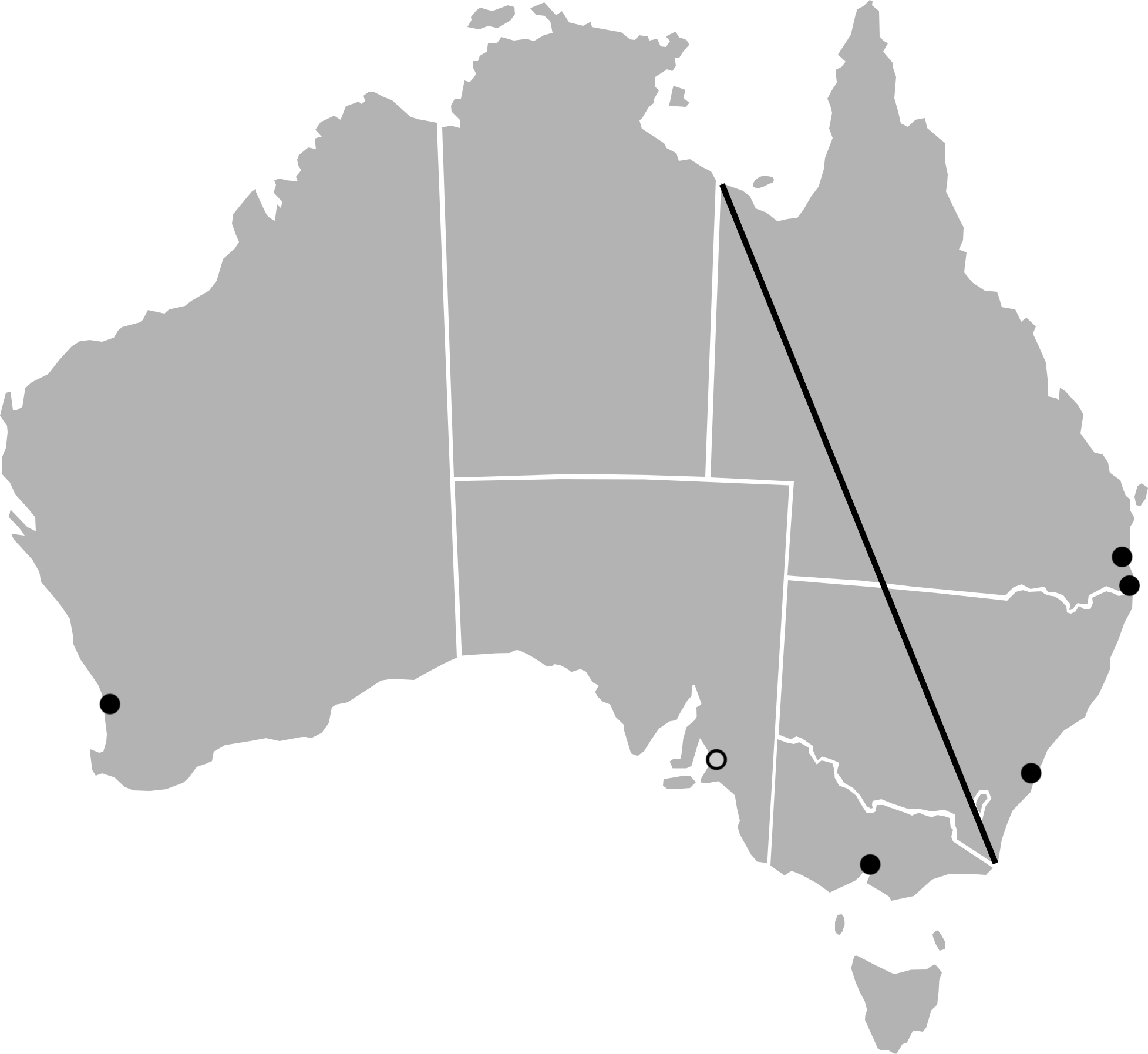
The Barassi Line, as proposed by Ian Turner in 1978. The line divides regions where Australian rules football (southwest) and rugby league (northeast) dominate. Solid dots mark cities with at least one top-level club defying the divide; hollow dots indicate former clubs.

The Barassi Line is an imaginary line in Australia which approximately divides areas where Australian rules football is the most popular football code from those where rugby football is more widely followed, particularly rugby league but also rugby union. On either side of the line, crowd figures, media coverage, and participation rates tend to favour the locally dominant code.

While the term was coined by historian Ian Turner in his 1978 Ron Barassi Memorial Lecture, the divide emerged much earlier, in the 1880s, and became firmly established by the early 20th century. Roughly speaking, the line follows Queensland's western border, drops southeast through western New South Wales (NSW), and ends at Cape Howe on the New South Wales–Victoria border. As a result, Queensland and NSW's eastern population centres fall on the rugby side, while Victoria, Tasmania, South Australia, Western Australia, the Northern Territory, and New South Wales' Riverina, Murray, and Far West regions fall on the Australian rules side. The line also runs through the Australian Capital Territory, where Australian rules and rugby enjoy comparable levels of grassroots support, although only elite rugby competitions have established representative teams there. The line splits the population roughly in half, owing to the concentration of Australians on the east coast.

In the 1980s, state leagues and competitions began expanding beyond the Barassi Line, with varying levels of success and financial support. Four clubs in the Australian Football League (AFL), the elite Australian rules competition, currently compete beyond the line: Sydney Swans (relocated 1982), Brisbane Lions (formed 1996), Gold Coast Suns (2009), and Greater Western Sydney Giants (2010). The Brisbane Bears (1987–1996) also competed in the league before merging to form the Lions. In rugby league, the only current National Rugby League (NRL) club based beyond the line is the Melbourne Storm (formed 1997). Defunct rugby league teams include the WA Reds (1995–1997) and Adelaide Rams (1997–1998). The Super Rugby club Western Force (formed 2005) is currently the only professional rugby union team beyond the line, following the dissolution of the Melbourne Rebels (2009–2024). The NRL also uses its annual State of Origin series as a promotions vehicle on the AFL side of the Barassi Line. Active expansion bids include Cairns (AFL) and Perth (NRL).

The Barassi Line is regarded as globally unique and arguably Australia's "strongest sociogeographic dividing characteristic". Most other sports are unaffected by the divide; for example, cricket has maintained broad national popularity, while soccer is also popular throughout Australia.

== Origin of the term ==
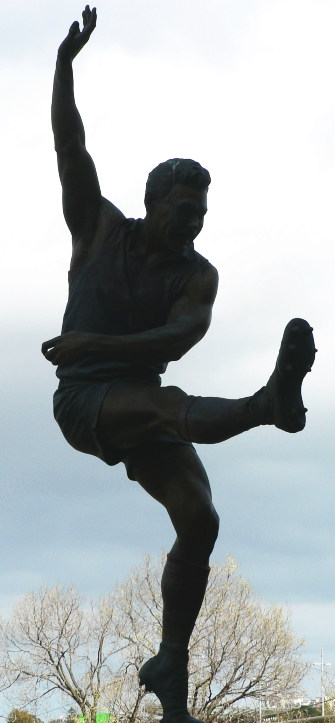
Statue of Australian rules football star Ron Barassi Jr., namesake of the Barassi Line

The Ron Barassi Memorial Lecture was a series of lectures named after Ron Barassi Sr. given between 1966 and 1978 by Ian Turner, a professor of history at Monash University. Barassi Sr. played a number of Australian rules football games for Melbourne in the Victorian Football League (VFL) before enlisting to fight in World War II and subsequently dying in action at Tobruk.

The Barassi Line itself was named after Ron Barassi Jr., the elder Barassi's son, who was a star player for Melbourne and Carlton and a premiership-winning coach with Carlton and North Melbourne. He believed in spreading the code of Australian rules football around the nation with an evangelical zeal, and became coach and major supporter of the relocated Sydney Swans. He foresaw a time when Australian rules football clubs from around Australia, including up to four from New South Wales and Queensland, would play in a national football league with only a handful of them based in Melbourne, but his ideas were largely ridiculed at the time.

== History and development of Australia's football divide ==
There is documentary evidence of "foot-ball" being played by British colonists and military in Australia as early as the 1820s. These games were poorly documented but appear to have been informal, one-off affairs.

=== Origin of Australian rules football (1859) ===
In 1858, cricketers, sports' enthusiasts and school students began to regularly play variants of English public school football in the parklands of Melbourne.The following year, four members of the newly formed Melbourne Football Club codified the laws which was later known as Victorian rules and Australian rules football.The code reached Sydney in NSW in 1865, Brisbane in Queensland by 1866 and had been played in other colonies by 1868. However despite an explosion in popularity in Victoria, it struggled to gain acceptance outside of its home colony.

=== Arrival of rugby (1870) ===
Rugby football became organised in Sydney, NSW, in 1870 with the formation of the Wallaroo FC. In 1874 the city's clubs and schools organised into the Southern Rugby Football Union (SRFU / now the NSWRU). While the last Australian rules club in Sydney had gone defunct in 1868, the SRFU nevertheless adopted a by-law stipulating that its members (clubs and schools) could only play matches against other members, effectively making the formation of any new Australian rules club on its own futile.

=== Australian rules and rugby vie for dominance in the north (1870s) ===
Intercolonial rivalry between Sydney and Melbourne was by far the strongest with the Victorian colony surpassing it as Australia's most prominent city just a decade after its separation. While Australian rules remained dominant in Queensland, rugby began to prove a strong competitor in its capital Brisbane as interest in intercolonials against New South Wales began to grow. However Victorian rules began to increase its southern footprint with South Australia and Tasmania in the late 1870s, adopted the code to facilitate through representative matches against Victoria. The decision was made easier given the similarities to their own code and the Victorian code would grow there virtually unopposed. While slow to grow initially, rugby by the 1880s had become firmly established in Sydney, Perth and Brisbane.Meanwhile, both Brisbane (QFA) and Sydney (NSWFA) had Australian rules bodies and clubs.

=== Divide begins to form (1880s–1890s) ===
Queensland followed Sydney in 1884 when the colony's largest schools there voted to switch to rugby, causing the collapse of the code by there by the end of that decade. By the 1890s, Australian rules was extinct in Sydney and Brisbane with rugby spreading virtually unopposed throughout the respective colonies of New South Wales and Queensland. In Queensland, the Northern Rugby Football Union successfully banned the Australian code and rugby's popularity rose through success in intercolonial matches with New South Wales. As Australian rules gradually recovered its position in New South Wales, the Southern Rugby Football Union, the colony's governing football body introduced a ban on the Victorian code as early as 1874 to prevent its spread across the Victorian border. While it was not able to halt the Australian code, it severely impaired its growth until the turn of the century.

In the 1890s Australian rules began to surpass rugby union as the dominant code in Western Australia by the turn of the 20th Century and clear north-east/west divide between Australian rules and rugby territory had begun to form.

Australian rules experienced a national resurgence at the turn of the century however Rugby League's introduction in 1908 ushered in professionalism which after World War I firmly established the code over rugby union in Sydney and Brisbane respectively, with the governing bodies assisting to spread this code through the major cities to the remote areas of the state mainly through school football. Rugby league's spread however met resistance in areas where Australian rules remained strong, such as the Riverina and Broken Hill in New South Wales as well as the Northern Territory which had developed a strong Australian rules following after the war. In the newly declared territories of the Australian Capital Territory and Northern Territory both codes would at times compete for marketshare, though Australian rules would continue to prove dominant.

=== Battle lines drawn in the Riverina (1920s–40s) ===
The introduction of inter-town challenge cup football contests to rugby league (such as the Maher Cup) saw a rapid rise in the code's popularity in the Riverina towns over Australian rules. In 1946, rugby league authorities convinced the NSW government to ban Australian rules in public schools in an effort to oust it from the Riverina, which resulted in schools previously playing the code in its major heartlands of Albury and Wagga switching to rugby league.

At the time the term was first used, existing club competitions were semi-professional and state-based. The first national club football competitions emerged in the late 20th century: the Championship of Australia, the NFL Night Series and the National Soccer League.

=== Code wars as national competitions professionalise and expand (1980s) ===
In the 1980s, the VFL and NSW Rugby League premiership (and Amco Cup) began a period of professionalism and expansion, forming the basis of today's Australian Football League (AFL) and National Rugby League (NRL).

Given the dominance of Australian rules and rugby league on either side, other codes have also been slow to establish sustainable national competitions. The multinational body SANZAAR, which organises the Super Rugby competition in rugby union, expanded their domestic competitions in 1996 to include teams from both sides. Football Federation Australia revamped its flagship competition, the A-League, to focus on a more nationally balanced competition in 2005. Its current composition reflects association football's participation and growth per capita, which is by far strongest in the east (where it faces less competition with Australian rules).

=== Current status ===
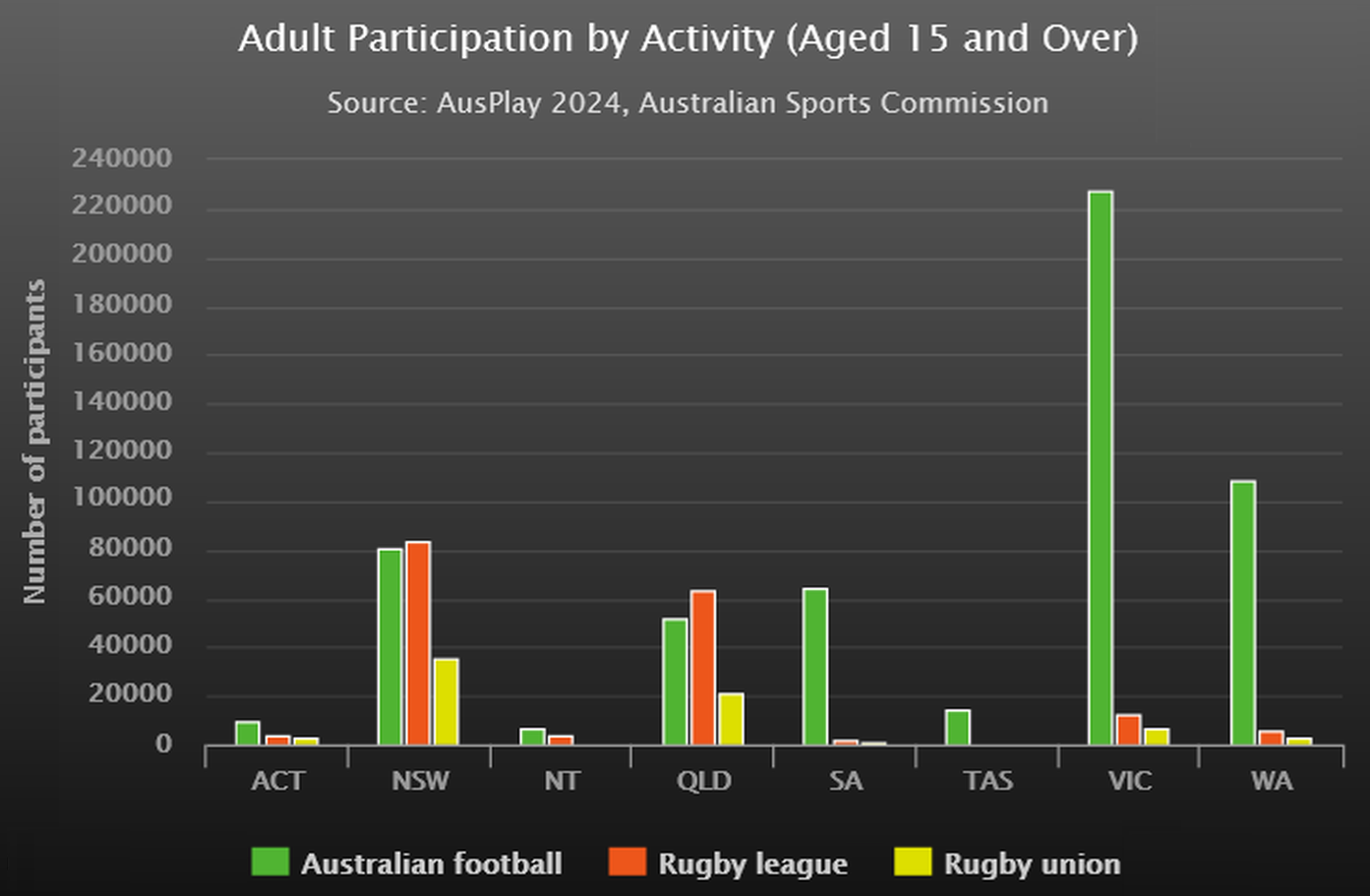
Bar graph showing the number of adult participants in Australian football, rugby league, and rugby union across Australian states and territories

Australian rules football is now the most popular football code to the west and south, including the capitals of Melbourne, Perth, Adelaide, Hobart, and Darwin while rugby league is more popular on the eastern side, including the capitals of Sydney, Brisbane and Canberra. Each side represents roughly half of the Australian population due to the concentration of the population on the east coast.

A 2022 study of grassroots support found that just 15% of Australian rules football clubs (243 of 1616) and 13% of rugby league clubs (109 of 863) are located across the line. In many areas the other side's sport remains virtually unknown, lacking any meaningful media profile or awareness. The football culture is significantly ingrained such that it even has an influence on Australians' movement throughout the country. These "insurmountable cultural barriers" have created a significant challenge for each code's national development.

== League structures and expansions ==
The pursuit of national exposure for sports is influenced by the ratings systems used by Australian television. By the late 1980s, the main football codes in Australia realised that in order to garner the desired high national ratings, and increase the value of their product for television broadcast deals and corporate sponsors, they needed to maximise their national exposure. This meant heavy investment in grassroots development and in the support of clubs on the "other" side of the Barassi Line.

=== Australian rules football ===
In 1990, the Victorian Football League changed its name to the Australian Football League (AFL) to pursue a more national focus. A major reason for the expansion into these non-traditional areas has been to increase both the number of games played each week, and the potential television audience. This resulted in income from television rights rising dramatically. From the 1997 AFL season, six of sixteen AFL clubs (Sydney, Brisbane Lions, West Coast, Adelaide, Fremantle and Port Adelaide) were based outside Victoria, with two (Sydney and Brisbane) on the rugby league side of the Barassi Line. Barassi's prophecy of a national Australian rules football league with four teams in New South Wales and Queensland has since been fulfilled with the establishment of Gold Coast and Greater Western Sydney in 2011 and 2012 respectively.

==== Australian Capital Territory ====
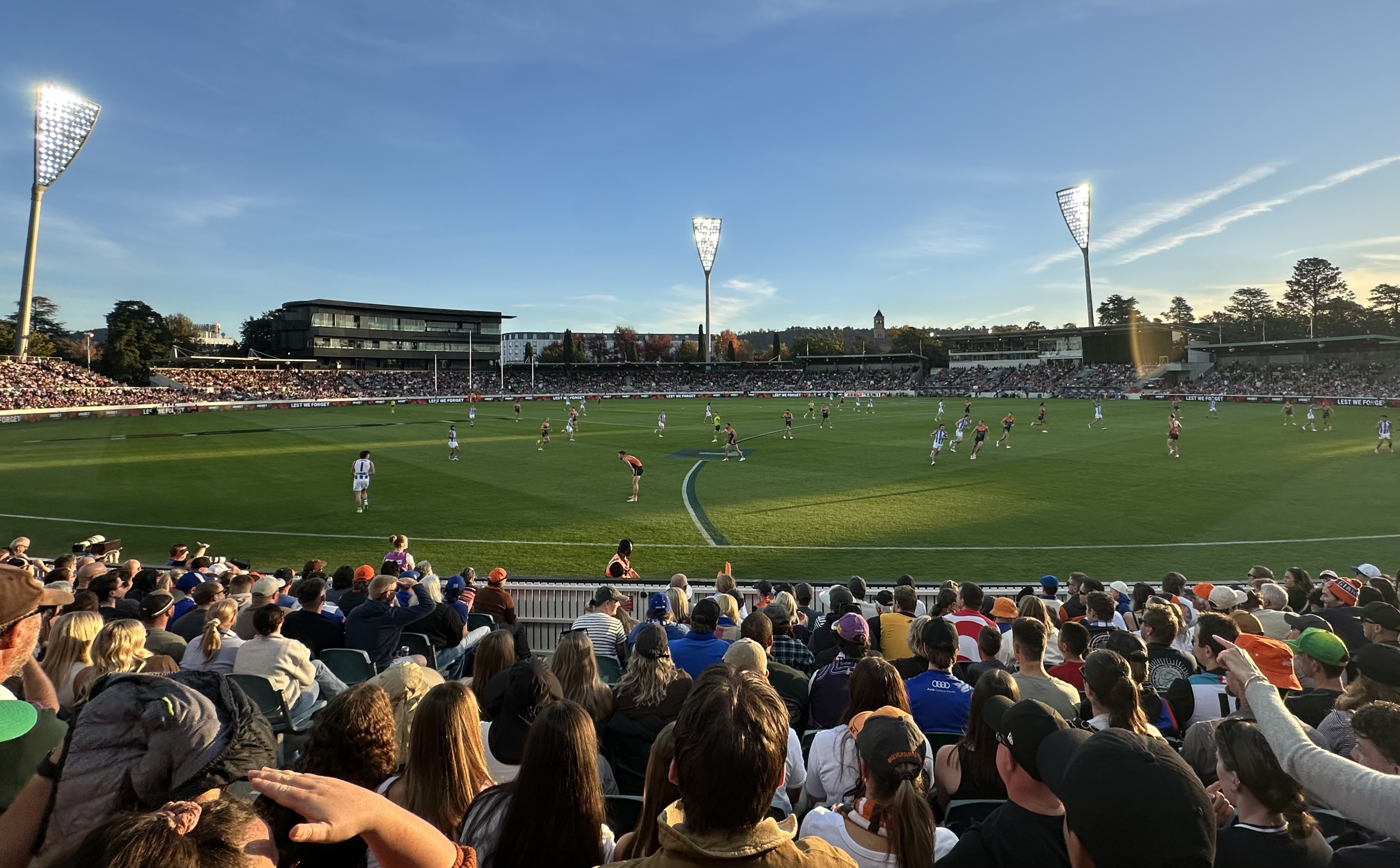
Manuka Oval, home of the code in the ACT. During the 2010s, the Greater Western Sydney Giants drew higher average attendances here than at their primary home ground, Giants Stadium in Sydney.

The Australian Capital Territory (ACT) was once seen as one of the dividing points of the Barassi Line. In 1981, the Australian Capital Territory Australian Football League had just begun to edge out rugby league in popularity with an increase in participation, and the first calls were made for the VFL to become a national competition. Under significant pressure from rugby league junior development in the territory and fearing the impact on its strong local competition of entry of a Sydney team, a formal bid for a license to enter a Canberra team into the VFL was made. The VFL dismissed it, stating it would consider Canberra for a license "within the next 10 years". The league was insistent that the license should go to Sydney, which it believed had a much larger potential broadcast audience. The following year, the New South Wales Rugby League entered the Canberra market with a new club, the Canberra Raiders. The long-term impact of the lack of an AFL club and the introduction of the Raiders saw Australian rules football fall from marginally most popular to least popular of the football codes. Subsequent bids for a Canberra team were rejected by the VFL in 1981, 1986 and 1988, and then by the AFL in 1990 and 1993.

The AFL began playing matches at the newly developed Bruce Stadium as 1990 with a view of it being the future home of the sport. However, politician and former Canberra Raiders rugby league player Paul Osborne began a successful campaign to exclude the AFL from the expanding stadium which ultimately resulted in its conversion into a rectangular field in 1997, effectively putting an end to any future ACT AFL bids. Following this setback, the AFL preferred its existing clubs—most notably North Melbourne—to sell their home games to Manuka Oval. AFL clubs have done so since 2002; however, they have refrained from committing to the market long-term.

In 2012, the Greater Western Sydney Giants signed a 10-year deal with the ACT Government worth $23 million, which resulted in the club playing four home games in Canberra each season. The Giants draw higher average attendances at Manuka Oval in Canberra than at their home ground, Giants Stadium in Sydney. In 2015, in response to questions relating to a proposed Canberra team, then AFL CEO Gillon McLachlan stated that "Canberra have their own team, the Giants". The AFL also claimed that Manuka Oval needed to be upgraded in order for the league to commit further to the market. After a failed $800 million stadium upgrade proposal, the AFL stated that the Giants–Canberra deal would continue regardless of if the redevelopment occurs. A significant share of Giants members are from the ACT; the figure was 5,800 in 2022. In 2015, the Giants set a target to overtake the Raiders membership and have more than 10,000 members by 2018. However, this failed, and the Raiders membership has rapidly outpaced it. Despite this, the deal was extended by the ACT government and the AFL to 2032 for three AFL matches and one AFLW match.

According to Tweedie's 2022 study, the ACT is "close to 50-50" in grassroots support, with Australian rules participation increasing substantially since 2016 and GWS selling out three successive games during the 2024 AFL season. GWS is now drawing larger crowds in Canberra than rugby union's ACT Brumbies, but is facing continued growth in popularity of rugby league's Canberra Raiders. Inadequate ageing infrastructure continues a significant deterrent to any future AFL expansion there.

==== New South Wales ====
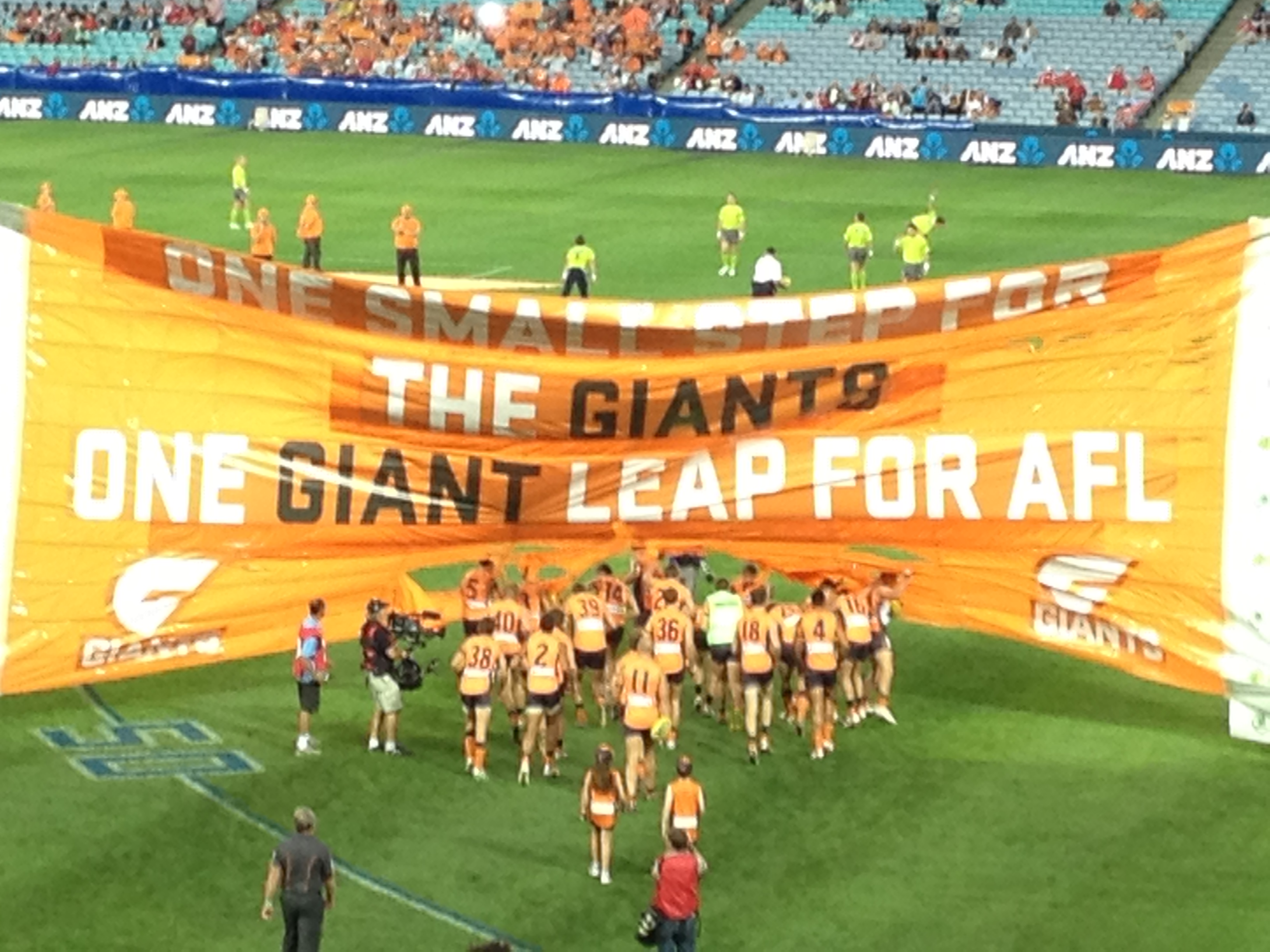
Banner at the inaugural Sydney Derby between Greater Western Sydney and Sydney in 2012, heralding the Australian Football League's 'giant leap' in New South Wales

Encouraged by the VFL, the South Melbourne Football Club relocated to Sydney and became the Sydney Swans in 1982. The club endured limited success and a series of wooden spoons in their first decade in Sydney before turning a corner in the mid-1990s, culminating in premierships in 2005 and 2012.

The lack of public support in Sydney caused significant financial losses to the club and league during the late 1980s and early 1990s. Excluding a period of privatisation, despite significant loans and writedowns to the club, the league declared the Sydney Swans insolvent in 1984 and again in 1988. In 1992, the 15 other AFL clubs were asked to vote on expelling the Swans due to its inability to survive in Sydney. AFL clubs were left with little other option but to commit to subsidising the club to maintain an audience in Sydney. These subsidies were increased until the Swans became viable in the long term. This long-term sustainability was initially aided by a grand final appearance in 1996 and fallout from the Super League war on rugby league.

In addition to promoting the Swans, the AFL attempted to use Auskick participation as a tool to increase awareness in the Sydney market by introducing a generation of children to the sport; however, the success of this strategy has been criticised. The AFL commissioned a study in 2012 by David Lawson, a Melbourne University academic, that found that contrary to reports by the league, club participation rates in Sydney had actually stalled, and that the AFL was masking low figures by using short-term, non-club-affiliated Auskick participants and comparing them to competitive junior club participation numbers in other sports. The league was also accused of faking registration figures in an attempt to gain access to Sydney playing fields.

The AFL introduced a second New South Wales team, the Greater Western Sydney Giants, in 2012, subsidised with millions of dollars of investment and a generational vision to grow into the Greater Western Sydney region. AFL CEO Andrew Demetriou predicted that it would take "20 to 30 years" for GWS to become a "powerhouse club" in terms of support drawing from a potential supporter base of over 2 million people. The league helped secure AFL legend coach Kevin Sheedy to help initially establish the club. As part of its effort to win over rugby league followers in Sydney, the AFL recruited rugby league star Israel Folau, who had not even heard of the sport, using a promotional salary of more than $6 million over four years. Folau broke his AFL contract after just one season and his conversion was criticised by the media as a failed promotional exercise. The strategic success of the Giants franchise has been widely questioned. Despite a grand final appearance in 2019, the club's Sydney audience failed to grow, especially among working class rugby league fans. Though in 2021, a fall in the popularity of rugby union and the NSW Waratahs saw many union fans switch to the Swans, further establishing it as a sports club of choice for Sydney's wealthy.

The AFL began zone and academy recruitment programs, fostering talented young players from clubs in the Riverina (where the code retains a strong following) to Sydney and helping the code to recruit talented athletes from metropolitan areas. In addition to the growth of the game in Sydney, this grassroots expansion has contributed to the Barassi Line moving slightly further north of the border. However, the long campaign to lift the sport's popularity in Sydney and New South Wales has been hindered by deep rooted cultural barriers, which even an Australian Senate inquiry has described as insurmountable. In 2023 and 2024, despite strong performances from the Giants and Swans, junior numbers are rapidly declining in Western Sydney with numerous junior clubs forced to fold or merge.

In the AFL's 2023 distribution of variable funding to all 18 clubs, GWS tied Gold Coast in receiving $25 million (equal-highest amount), while the Swans, along with Melbourne, Port Adelaide and Western Bulldogs, received $16 million (equal-9th-highest amount).

==== Queensland ====
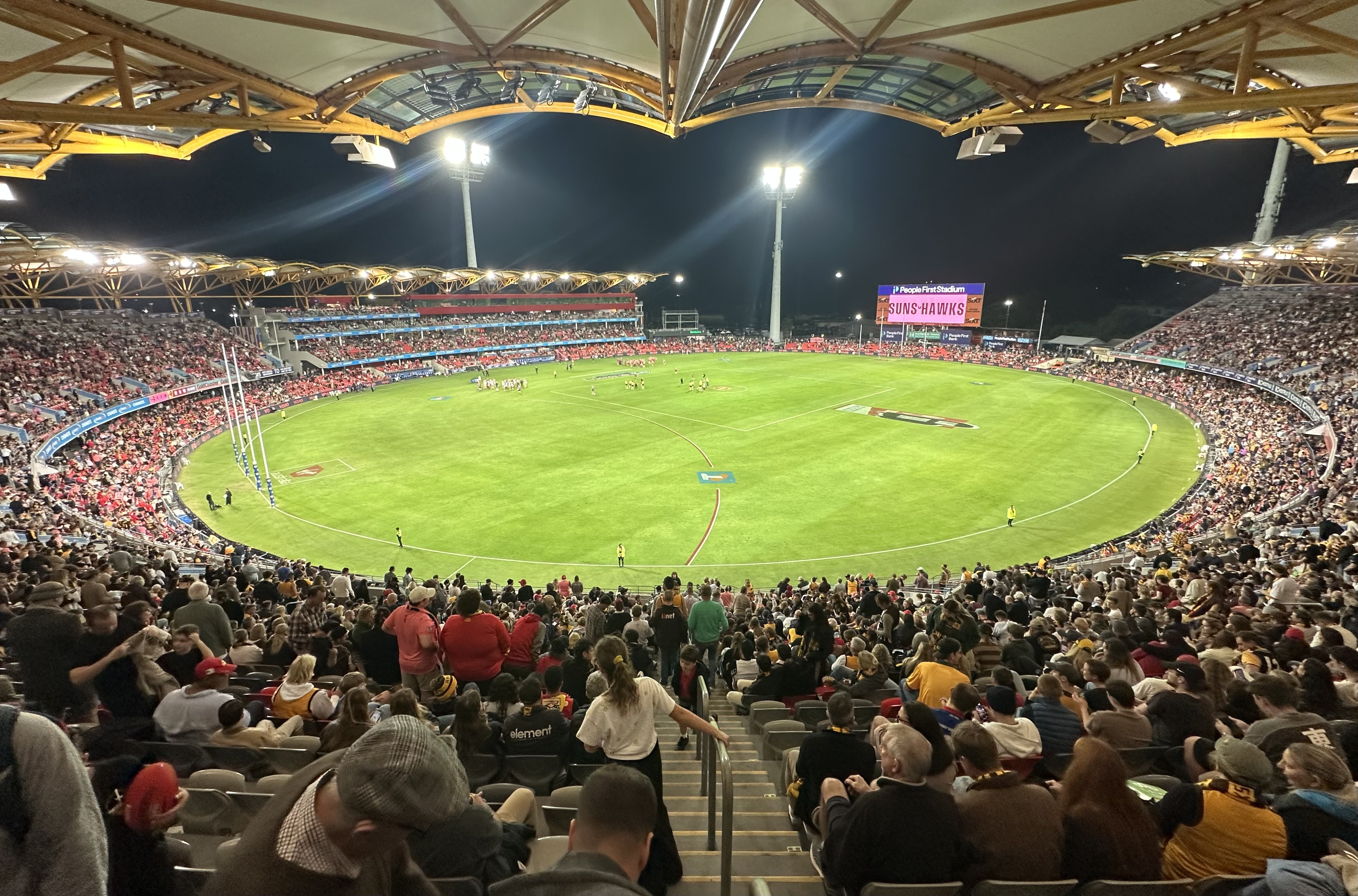
Carrara Stadium on the Gold Coast

After existing in the shadow of rugby football for almost a century, interest in Australian rules and the Queensland Australian Football League grew substantially in the 1970s and 1980s, aided by significant interstate migration. The Brisbane Bears were founded as the VFL's first privately owned expansion team in 1986, initially based on the Gold Coast. It suffered enormously with the introduction of the Brisbane Broncos, a rugby league expansion club based in the state's capital specifically created to deny the Bears and the VFL a market. The Bears performed poorly on-field, including back-to-back wooden spoons in 1990 and 1991. Poor support for the club in both Gold Coast and Brisbane saw it run into financial difficulties despite significant AFL subsidies and concessions. With their demise imminent, the AFL intervened and forced a merger with the historic Melbourne-based club Fitzroy in 1996.

The newly formed Brisbane Lions were vastly more successful, becoming the first triple-premiership winner in 46 years, winning back-to-back in 2001, 2002 and 2003. The success of the Lions contributed to a boom in the sport across the major Queensland cities.

On the back of the code's subsequent growth, the AFL pushed heavily for a permanent presence on the Gold Coast, and despite failed attempts to relocate an existing club, granted a new license to the Gold Coast Football Club in 2009. As part of its effort to win over rugby league followers in Queensland, the AFL recruited rugby league star Karmichael Hunt using a promotional salary of more than $3.2 million. The AFL considered Hunt's promotional recruitment "a good investment" despite his return to rugby league.

While the AFL has gained market share in the major cities, the Barassi Line has barely moved in Queensland. A notable exception is the expansion of AFL Mount Isa in the state's west to include the outback Dajarra Rhinos team in 2018, the only senior club of any code within hundreds of kilometres of the state border. Rugby league remains otherwise entrenched at the grassroots across the state. The Lions and Suns generally only receive support from the Queensland public when they are performing well, and as such require significant concessions from the AFL to remain viable. The Lions, in particular, in 2023 had the competition's highest level of debt requiring more than $18 million a year in assistance from the AFL, while the Suns receive the highest amount of assistance - $25 million a year - to stay solvent.

In 2023, the Far North Queensland city of Cairns entered an official bid for the AFL's 20th license with a team based out of a redeveloped Cazaly's Stadium, vying with a Darwin-based club for entry by 2030. The stadium has hosted at least one AFL premiership match every year since 2011, with an average attendance of 7,120. While Cairns' population is higher than Darwin's, AFL attendances and overall participation are lower and a Cairns-based club would also compete for market share with the Townsville-based North Queensland Cowboys and would likely require a similar AFL assistance package to the Lions and Suns.

=== Rugby league ===
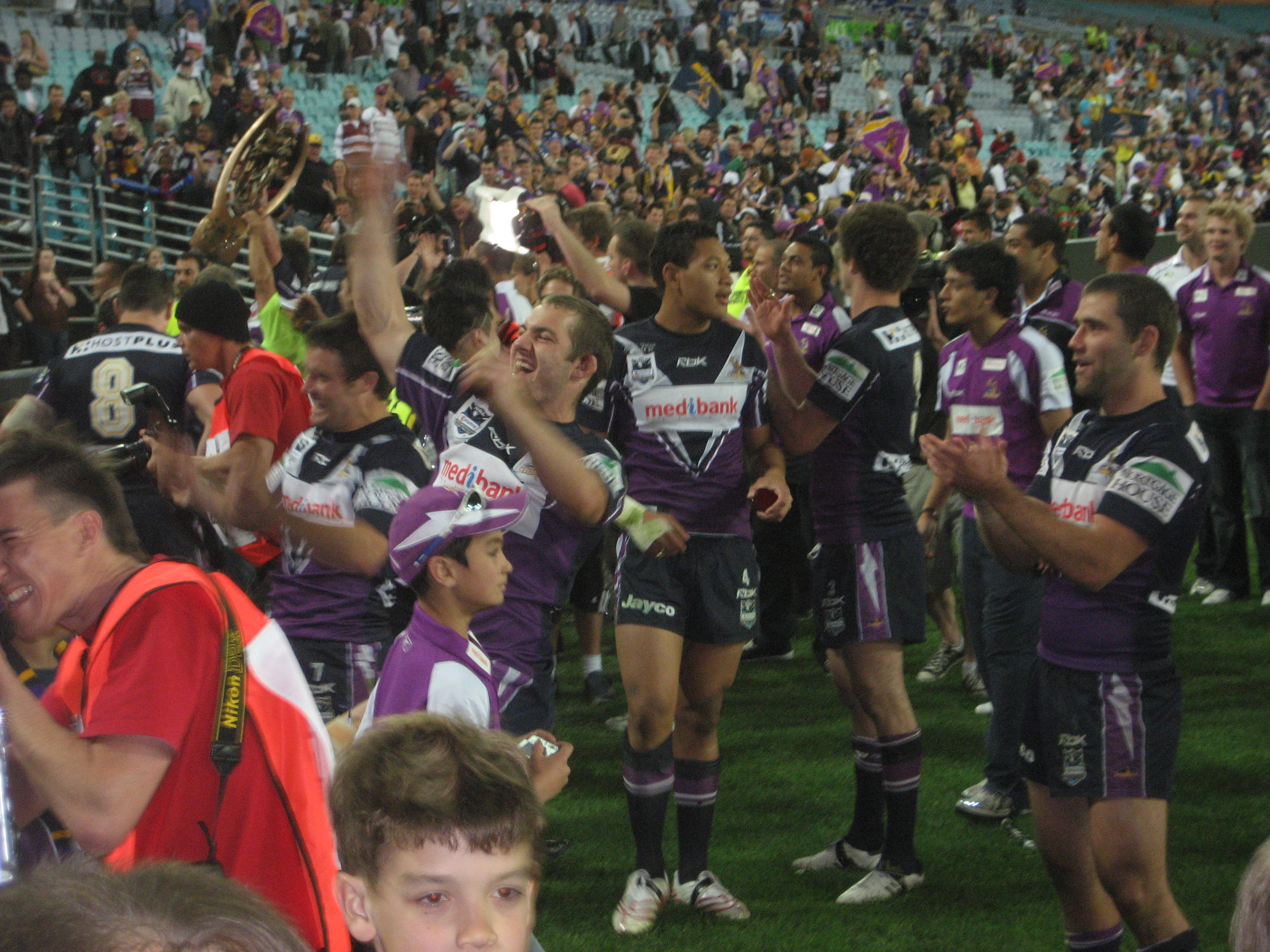
Melbourne Storm players after the 2007 Grand Final. This premiership, among other team achievements, was later stripped from them due to salary cap breaches.

Apart from occasional visiting teams and false starts the Rugby league's local presence was virtually nonexistent behind the Barassi line until 1950 when the Northern Territory Rugby Football League Association was founded in Darwin, followed by the South Australian Rugby League in Adelaide in 1976. Rugby league's expansion across the Barassi line has been driven primarily from the top down by professional franchises and benefited in part from its familiarity with rugby union.

In 1995, the Australian Rugby League (ARL) created four new expansion teams including one in Perth, resulting in the first major rugby league club based on the Australian rules football side of the Barassi Line, the Western Reds. By the time the breakaway Super League started in 1997, it had begun establishing more clubs on the opposite side of the line. The Adelaide Rams and the Melbourne Storm were due to start in the 1998 Super League season, but in the meantime, the opposing leagues made restitution and established the National Rugby League (NRL). Part of the agreement to form a new league included a reduction of clubs in the league, especially those recently established in difficult markets, resulting in the disbanding of the clubs in Perth and Adelaide. The Storm continued with success in the new competition, achieving their first premiership win in 1999.

When a Melbourne NRL side was proposed in 1997, Barassi stated to the media, "I've always thought rugby league would be a success in Melbourne. They've got to start down here sometime and the earlier the better. Melburnians love their sport and I'm sure they'd get behind rugby league. But they won't accept rubbish and that's the key to it".

In the aftermath of the Super League war, the NRL became very reluctant to expand. Commissioner chairman Peter V'landys signalled that the competition was focused on creating a second team in Brisbane (which became the Dolphins), instead of investing money into AFL states such as Western Australia, which "don't have a huge audience" for rugby league.

Melbourne remains the sole NRL club on the other side of the line. Perth is the only current expansion bid, the consortia chaired by Peter Cummins has been active since 2012, though some see it as only possible to maintain a national supporter base if merged with that of another bid by a Sydney club, such as that of the North Sydney Bears (known as the Perth Bears bid).

The ARL continues to use the State of Origin series as a promotional tool across the Barassi line, hosting more than eight Origin matches in Melbourne since 1990, two in Perth since 2019, and two in Adelaide since 2020, though some have criticised the promotional value of hosting it outside of its heartland.

=== Rugby union ===
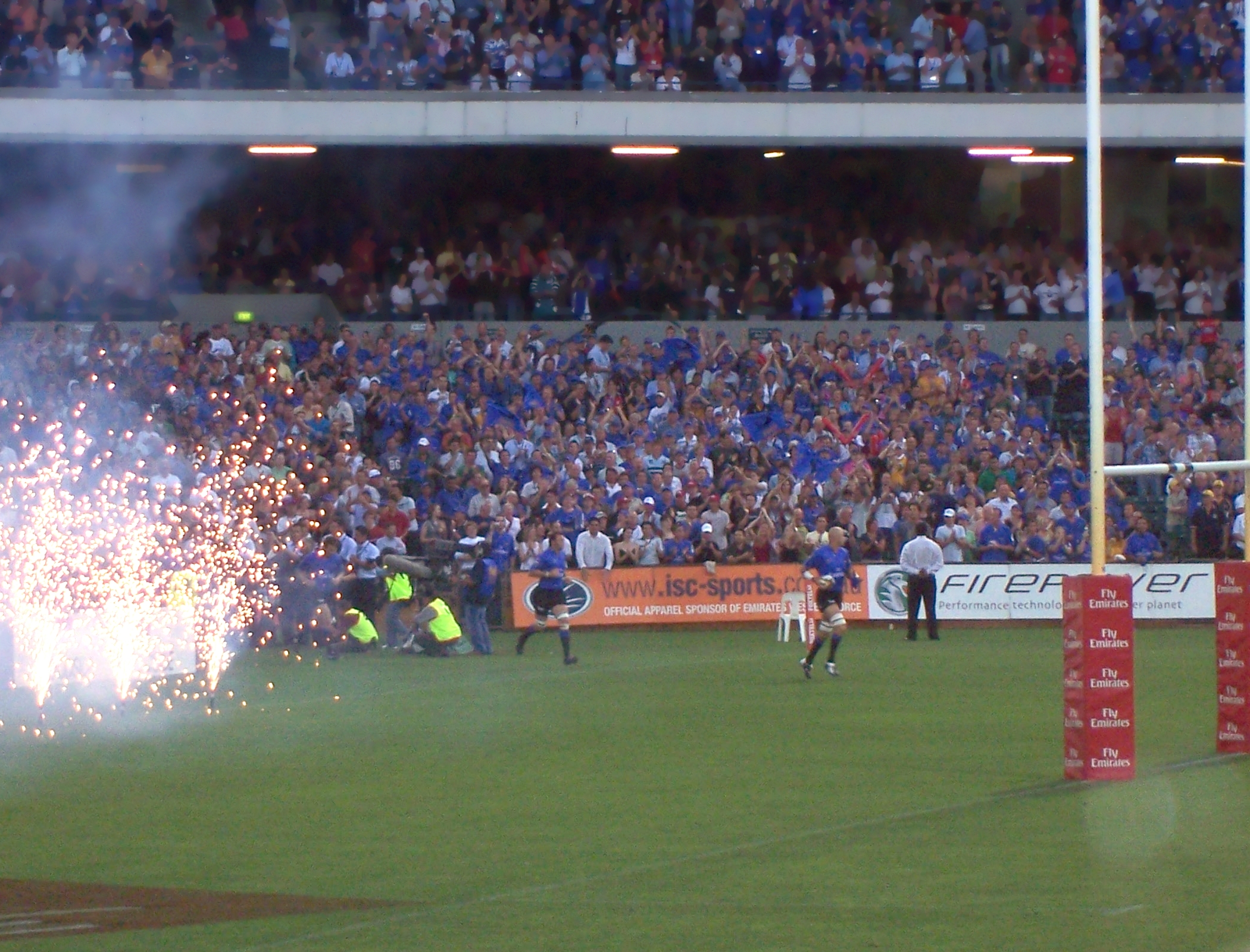
Western Force running out for their first home game at Subiaco Oval in 2006

Rugby union has also attempted to expand on the Australian football side of line, with mixed results. Western Australia, and Perth in particular, is a market which has had strong historical grassroots support. This is due primarily to a strong expatriate presence, particularly of Anglo-Celtic Australians, South African Australians and New Zealand Australians for whom rugby is generationally popular. While grassroots rugby participation is statistically lower in Victoria and Melbourne, it too has a statistically significant population of expatriates from which to draw support.

Shortly after the sport went professional in August 1995, the Australian Rugby Union (ARU) joined forces with the New Zealand Rugby Football Union and South African Rugby Union to create the Super 12 competition. It began in 1996 with five regional franchises from New Zealand, four provincial teams from South Africa, and three state/territory teams from Australia. The three Australian teams were all in rugby territory. For the 2006, with the competition then becoming the Super 14, significantly, the new Australian team, the Western Force, was based in Perth.

The following year, the ARU sought to create a national domestic competition, launching the Australian Rugby Championship (ARC). It launched with eight teams, with the Melbourne Rebels and Perth Spirit based on the opposite side of the line. However, the ARC lasted only one season.

The next expansion of rugby union on the opposite side of the line came in 2011, when the current Melbourne Rebels were added as Australia's fifth team in the newly renamed Super Rugby.

In 2013, the ARU announced that a new domestic competition, the National Rugby Championship (NRC), would start play in 2014. Of its nine inaugural teams, two were across the line: Melbourne Rising and a revived Perth Spirit. Both Melbourne Rising and Perth Spirit made the finals series three times, and Perth won the NRC title in 2016. The NRC was last held in 2019.

Neither the Western Force nor the Melbourne Rebels have qualified for the finals series in either the Super 14 or Super Rugby. In 2017, the Western Force was cut from the Super Rugby competition for the 2018 season.

In 2024, the Melbourne Rebels were axed after insurmountable financial debts and losses.

== Physical commemorations ==
The Barassi Line is symbolically marked on Federation Way between the towns of Corowa and Wahgunyah near the New South Wales—Victoria state border at the Murray River. Two sets of Australian rules football goal posts are aligned diagonally on either side of the road, with a sign located nearby explaining the site. The set of goal posts were installed in 2005 as part of work associated with the Centenary of Federation funded bridge and bypass road, and was opened on 5 April 2005 by the Federal Member for Farrer, Sussan Ley on behalf of Prime Minister John Howard. Barassi himself visited the site in October 2012 on the occasion of installation of new signage by the Indigo Shire.

== See also ==
- Football in Australia
