= Expansion of the Australian Football League =

The Australian Football League, currently an 18 team competition, has a history of expansion since 1908 when its eight-club competition, formed as an 1897 breakaway from the rival Victorian Football Association, grew to ten teams.

Many clubs have been proposed since this time, particularly since the 1980s when the league began to expand nationally. Only three teams have left the competition in its history.

The AFL Commission controls the competition's expansion licenses, and its most recently granted licenses occurred during the league's nationalisation: the 19th license was awarded to the Tasmania Football Club in 2023 (they will enter the league in 2028).

The private ownership model for licenses was more common in the 1980s, however clubs are run under a membership model. As of 2025, four of the expansion franchises and the Sydney Swans (who relocated from South Melbourne at the end of 1981) are now either directly controlled by or owned by the league.

The AFL Women's competition has followed the AFL in its expansion awarding licenses to each of the existing AFL clubs as it expanded from eight teams in 2017 to the current 18 teams in 2022, and will also have 19 teams from 2028.

== Formation of VFL (1896) ==
The VFL was formed in 1896 when Carlton, Collingwood, Essendon, Fitzroy, Geelong, Melbourne, South Melbourne and St Kilda left the Victorian Football Association.

A number of other VFA clubs were touted as becoming members of the VFL at this time, the most notable being North Melbourne and Port Melbourne. At the end of the 1921 VFL season, applications for entry were received from Footscray, Prahran, and Williamstown but none were granted admission. In 1923, Camberwell Football Club announced a desire to join the league, and asked the local council for funding to improve their ground to league standard.

=== North Melbourne ===
North Melbourne was denied entry due to Essendon believing that it would take its recruiting areas.

=== Port Melbourne ===
Port Melbourne was denied entry in favour of South Melbourne due to its reputation of having unruly fans.
North Melbourne eventually gained admission in 1925, and Port Melbourne continued to play in the VFA.

== VFL expansion (1925) ==
Between 1919 and 1925 the VFL sought expressions of interest from clubs wishing to gain admittance to the League. While Footscray, Hawthorn and North Melbourne were accepted in 1925, a number of existing VFA clubs were considered. The VFA clubs were Brighton, Brunswick, Port Melbourne and Prahran.

One impediment that the VFL encountered when considering admitting existing VFA clubs to its ranks in 1925 was the existing recruiting districts; the VFL clubs' districts had been drawn up equitably in 1915, and clubs were unwilling to surrender portions of their districts to incoming VFA clubs. One attempt to overcome this was the Public Service Football Club, which would draw its players from the public service rather than from a geographical district. The Public Service club was formally established in 1924 and was based at the newly built Motordrome, and it applied to join the VFL in 1925; but its application was rejected and the club disbanded without playing a game.

=== North Melbourne (1907, 1921) ===
After the split between the VFL and VFA, North Melbourne became one of the stronger clubs in the VFA. In 1908, after University was admitted to the league, North Melbourne merged with West Melbourne and applied to become the tenth team in the league as the City Football Club, but the proposal was rejected and Richmond was admitted instead. North Melbourne and West Melbourne were expelled from the VFA for attempting to defect, but North Melbourne returned to the VFA the same year under a new committee (having absorbed West Melbourne).

In another attempt to gain admission, North Melbourne proposed a merger with Essendon in 1921, when Essendon attempted to move to Arden Street after East Melbourne was closed and demolished. The proposal was rejected, and both clubs continued in their previous states; North Melbourne finally gained admission to the VFL in 1925.

=== Footscray (1919, 1922, 1923) ===
In the decade following World War I, Footscray became a powerhouse of the VFA. It was a rich club in a strong industrial area, and was able to recruit players aggressively from the VFL. It first applied for membership of the VFL in 1919, and then again in 1922 and 1923. It was admitted in 1925.

== VFL expansion proposals ==
In the mid-1950s there were additional discussions and an attempt by a club to gain admission into the VFL.

=== Bendigo (1951) and Ballarat (1955–56) ===
A move was raised in the 1940s to admit provincial sides from Bendigo and Ballarat. A 1951 move for Bendigo was the first formal proposal, with no specific club named a new composite license was the likely aim. In 1954 there was discussion within the VFL to expand the competition to include both Ballarat and Bendigo sides. On 14 July 1955 the Ballarat Football Club officially applied to join the VFL. Although the application was referred to a special sub-committee that was to meet and make a recommendation, there is no evidence that the application was ever acted on by the VFL.

== Fitzroy mergers (1980, 1986, 1989, 1994, 1996) ==
The Fitzroy Football Club, while being a league powerhouse in the early 1900s, found itself in financial difficulties by the 1980s. A number of mergers and relocations were proposed by both the league and the club throughout the 1980s and 1990s, culminating in the club merging its playing operations with the Brisbane Bears in 1996.

== National Competition proposals (since 1980) ==
The same twelve clubs competed in the VFL between 1925 and 1986, except in 1942 and 1943 when Geelong went into recess due to travel restrictions, petrol rationing and loss of players to service in World War II. At the end of 1981, the financially troubled South Melbourne relocated to Sydney, and there were a number of developments in the 1980s, with new clubs being proposed as the League became the pre-eminent competition in the country.

=== East Perth (1980) ===
In 1980 East Perth of the West Australian Football League applied to join the VFL as the League's first non-Victorian club. Nothing came of this application.

=== Canberra / Australian Capital Territory (1981, 1986, 1988, 1990, 1993) ===
The Australian Capital Territory Australian Football League was the first league from a major city to express an interest in fielding a team in a national competition as early as the 1970s, however the first official bid was made in 1981, The VFL dismissed the bid, opting for a Sydney side instead. Following the entry of the Canberra Raiders, the sport in Canberra lost major ground to rugby league. In 1990, the ACTAFL began to arrange a deal with the AFL to field a Canberra-based team in the AFL Reserves competition from 1991, which the ACTAFL hoped would later lead to senior representation. The ACTAFL had received assurances from the AFL throughout 1990 that the bid was progressing well; but progress abruptly stalled and the bid failed in August 1990 when Port Adelaide made its bid to join the AFL, drawing almost all of the AFL's strategic focus to the South Australian situation.

=== Norwood Redlegs (1982, 1985, 1986, 1990, 1994) ===
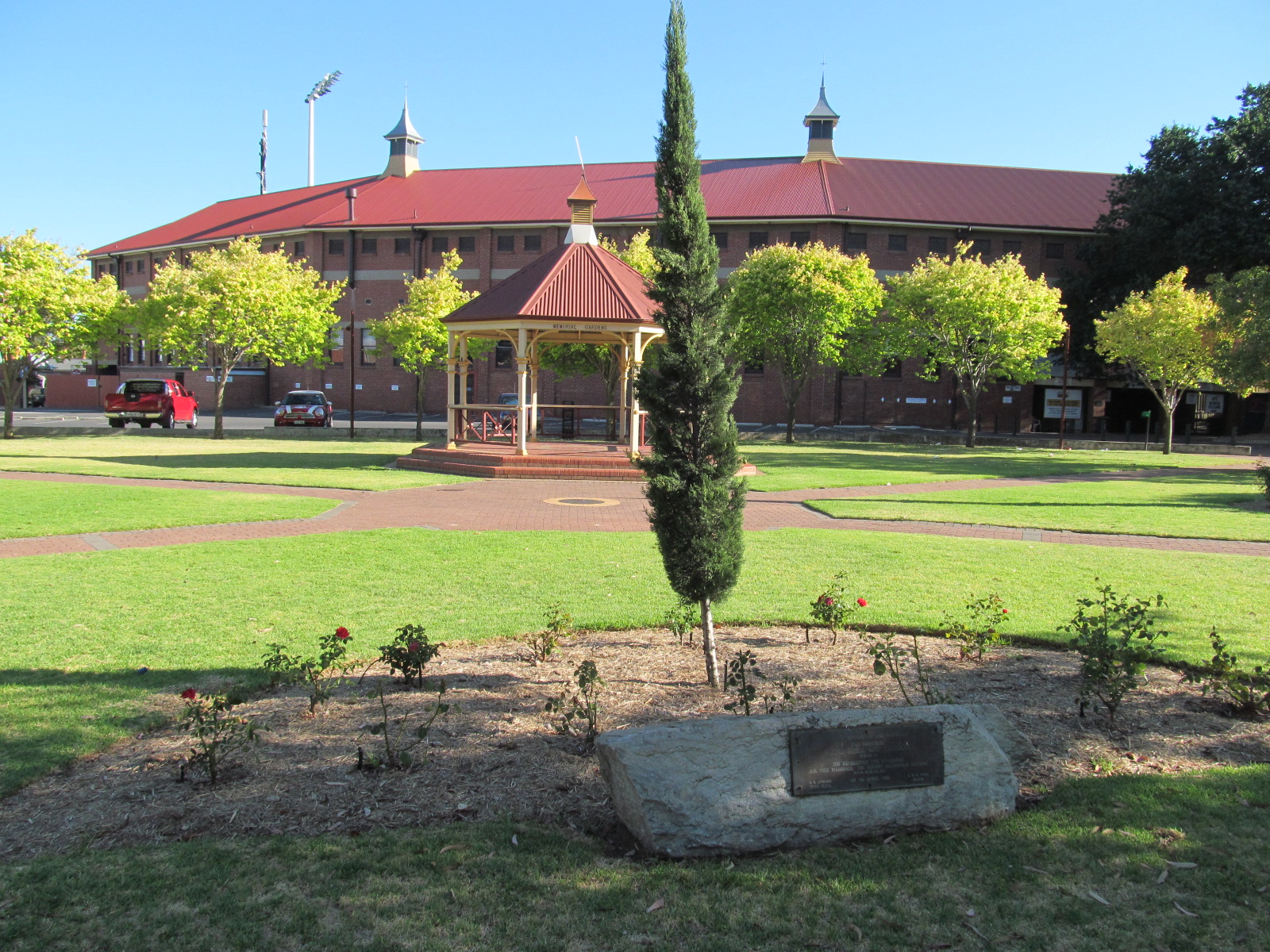
The Norwood Football Club had sought to join the AFL on numerous occasions.

In 1982 the Norwood Football Club had sought discussions with the VFL about admissions but these met with cold responses. When Port Adelaide were privately seeking admission into the AFL during 1990, the AFL approached the club but Norwood decided to follow the SANFL's decision with its intentions undecided at the time.

=== Fremantle Sharks (1987) ===
In 1987, the first year after the admission of the West Coast Eagles to the VFL, traditional rival WAFL clubs East Fremantle and South Fremantle had discussions on the possibility of merging and joining the VFL as a second Perth-based team. The merged club was to have been known as the Fremantle Sharks, and to have played at Fremantle Oval.

=== New Zealand (1987) ===
In 1987 The VFL Board of Directors receives a proposal from the New Zealand Government for a team in Wellington.

=== Los Angeles Crocodiles (1987) ===
In 1987 a $10 million proposal from Perth magnate Errol Marron was put forward for a VFL expansion club based partly in Los Angeles and partly in Melbourne named the Los Angeles Crocodiles (attempting to cash in on the popularity of the previous year's hit film Crocodile Dundee) with profits from increased television rights to fund a local league. Stadiums in the proposal included the Los Angeles Memorial Coliseum. In October 1987, Ross Oakley announced that the VFL had officially rejected the bid.

=== Port Adelaide (1990) ===
Seven years before their debut season in the AFL, SANFL club Port Adelaide applied to become the AFL's first South Australian club.

During the 1990 pre-season, Port Adelaide played a practice match against the Geelong Cats at Football Park before a crowd of 35,000. However, the bid was met with legal issues within South Australia that resulted in the SANFL creating the Adelaide Crows.

=== Norwood-Sturt (1990s) ===
A rival bid proposed by Norwood and financially struggling Sturt to combat Port Adelaide's second bid was seriously considered during the early 1990s. When Port Adelaide won the second licence the Norwood-Sturt merger was still discussed but relations between the clubs quickly soured.

=== Tasmania (1992, 1994, 1995, 1997, 1998, 2008, 2019-2023) ===
Tasmania is traditionally a strong Australian rules football state, and as such had long been touted as being a location for an AFL club.

In October 1992, the AFL Commission voted on shutting down the Sydney Swans, as the club had accrued over AUD $9 million of debt. With Melbourne clubs siding against the Swans, the AFL was desperate to offset the potential loss of the Swans to the national competition, so the AFL offered the TFL an AFL license. However, the TFL declined the license fee, reported to be around AUD $4 million, claiming it was "10 years away" from being ready. In addition to finding money to pay the license fee, the TFL would have faced significant travel costs to send a team to the mainland every second week. As a result of Tasmania declining a license, the AFL had to prepare a multi-million-dollar assistance package to keep the Sydney club viable.

In April 1994, Tasmanian Sports Minister, Peter Hodgman, spoke to the AFL about the possible introduction of a local team to the league and had raised the possibility of state funding. Between 1994 and 1997, the bid was prepared for a Tasmanian team that involved the construction of a 30,000-capacity stadium at the Hobart Showgrounds in Glenorchy, at the cost of approximately $30 million.

The AFL's continued rejection of the Tasmanian AFL team raised significant controversy, with the Government of Australia launching a Senate inquiry in 2008 which AFL Commission CEO Andrew Demetriou and chairman Mike Fitzpatrick both declined to attend.

In 2018, a steering committee was formed by the AFL to look into the prospects of a Tasmanian team, they did not recommend a team, instead proposing the state enter the VFL in 2021. Off the back of this committee, a taskforce was formed in June 2019 to launch a fresh bid. By March 2022, this had extended to Tasmanian Premier Peter Gutwein proposing a new stadium in Hobart if the state was able to secure a team.

In November 2022, the AFL agreed on a license being provided, contingent on club presidents support and the new stadium being built. After Prime Minister Anthony Albanese pledged funding towards the new Macquarie Point Stadium in April 2023. Club presidents voted unanimously to grant the state the 19th license, bringing the Tasmania Football Club into existence on 2 May 2023.

=== East Coast Bears (1994) ===
"He's got to be fucking kidding"

— Former Collingwood president Allan McAllister, in response to Graeme Samuel's East Coast Bears proposal, The Boys' Club (Warner 2021)

An unpublicised proposal from Graeme Samuel to the AFL chiefs in 1994 brought forward the idea of a merger between the Brisbane Bears and Sydney Swans. The concept of the East Coast Bears would revolve around alternating home matches in Brisbane and Sydney.

=== Norwood Crows (1995) ===
During 1995 the Norwood Football Club, with the assistance of Wolf Blass, attempted to buy the Adelaide Crows and have them relocated to the Parade.

=== Southport Sharks (1996) ===
By 1995 the Southport Sharks had reached 20,000 members began to lead the charge for a second Queensland team entering the Australian Football League. In 1996, the Sharks made their first bid to the AFL for inclusion in the national league, which was rejected by the AFL in favour of Port Adelaide's proposal.
After which, the club continued to lobby for a licence.

Further attempts were made by the club to enter the AFL including purposed mergers with North Melbourne.

=== Melbourne Hawks (1996) ===
The Melbourne Hawks would have comprised a merger between the Melbourne and Hawthorn Football Clubs at the end of the 1996 season. Out of all the proposed merger combinations in the 1990s, it was seemed as ideal as it was known that Hawthorn had a football team which ranked as one of the best of all time but were in a dire financial situation, as opposed to Melbourne which had a sound financial base but were a club which had mostly struggled on-field since their last premiership in 1964.

Despite the controversial approval of the Melbourne Football Club board and members, the merger was voted out by Hawthorn members after a passionate campaign led by Don Scott.

=== Sydney Celtic (2008) ===
In March 2008, it was revealed by the media that the AFL had considered a radical proposal to launch an Irish-dominated team in Sydney's western suburbs, which would perform before an international audience under the "Celtic" brand name. At the time, the Irish Experiment was peaking with numerous Irish players in the AFL. The "Sydney Celtics" plan was first put to AFL chief executive Andrew Demetriou in early 2007 by Gaelic Players Association executive Donal O'Neill. It was said that the proposal originated at the International Rules series in Ireland in late 2006 when O'Neill put forward a plan to purchase an AFL licence in Sydney. The idea had been boosted by the hype generated by Tadgh Kennelly's appearance for Sydney in the AFL Grand Final, having become one of the club's better locally known players. However, the idea never materialised and the AFL has since stated that this was never a serious option and it proceeded to make plans for a new license, which was to become the Greater Western Sydney Giants.

=== Northern Territory (2018) ===
In October 2018, the Government of the Northern Territory announced that it would allocate $100,000 towards a "scoping study" to investigating whether the Territory should bid for an AFL licence when it becomes available. Chief Minister Michael Gunner and AFL Northern Territory CEO Stuart Totham met with AFL CEO Gillon McLachlan in Melbourne to discuss the potential bid. It was reported that an AFL licence would not become available until 2028 at the earliest.

If successful, the team would play its home games at TIO Stadium in Darwin and at Traeger Park in Alice Springs.

== Future proposals ==
Listed below are potential clubs that have been suggested by lobby groups, local governments or the AFL itself as regions that the league has expressed interest in granting licences.

=== Official bids and 20th license ===
==== Canberra, Australian Capital Territory (1981–) ====
Canberra has had an open bid for a license backed by AFL Canberra and the ACT government since the 1980s, which has been overlooked by the VFL/AFL for decades including when the South Melbourne became the Sydney Swans in 1982, in 1985 prior to the sale of the club to Geoffrey Edelsten, in 1986 when it was overlooked in favour of Perth and Brisbane, in 1988 when the Swans folded and the licence was put out to tender, in 1993 ("AFL For Canberra Bid"), 1995, a proposed relocation of the North Melbourne Kangaroos, and again in 2008 when licenses were awarded to Greater Western Sydney and the Gold Coast. In 2019, the AFL CEO Gillion McLachlan stated that Canberra now belongs to the Giants which has a multi-million dollar deal to host games at Manuka Oval, the main AFL venue in the region. Despite is location behind the Barassi Line and the presence of teams in other football codes, Canberra has a large AFL audience and growing popular and is seen as being the most popular option with AFL fans.

==== Cairns, North Queensland (2010–) ====
Cairns, Queensland has been bidding for an AFL license involving AFL Cairns (which owns the proposed venue Cazaly's Stadium) and AFL Queensland since at least 2010. In 2023 an official bid was made for the 20th AFL license in competition with Darwin. AFL Cairns boasts a strong local competition producing many talented players for the national competition and regular AFL matches hosted there. However Cairns and North Queensland is often cited as lacking the supporter base (being far behind the Barassi Line) and population to make a standalone AFL franchise successful. A Northern Australia joint venture between the Northern Territory and North Queensland is sometimes proposed as a more viable option. Despite making moves to collaborate with AFL Northern Territory, AFL Cairns has stated its intention for a standalone bid in competition with Darwin/NT.

==== Wellington or Auckland, New Zealand (1987–) ====
In 1987, the VFL Board of Directors received a proposal from the New Zealand Government for a team in Wellington.

The AFL stated in 2013 that Auckland was its next expansion priority pending construction of a suitable stadium and the bid has the backing of the local governing body, AFL New Zealand. Though Wellington has hosted all AFL premiership matches held to date between 2013 and 2015, the AFL has stated its preference is to locate a club in Auckland. The country's participation and average AFL attendance is similar to that of Tasmania, the NT and the ACT, and the catchment population is highest of all AFL markets without a club.

The proposal, however, has enormous challenges, including the lack of awareness in the sport, the lack of a suitable venue, and enormous popularity of rugby union and rugby league. Such a proposal would also require substantial ongoing subsidies from the AFL.

==== Northern Territory, Darwin and Alice Springs (2015–) ====
AFL Northern Territory and the Northern Territory Government have been bidding for an AFL license since at least 2015, proposing games to be hosted in both Darwin and Alice Springs. The Northern Territory Government launched an official bid for the 19th license in 2021 after a feasibility study in 2018, with entry proposed for 2030. The business case continues to be developed along with stadium proposals. With the admission of Tasmania as the 19th license, NT began to bid for the 20th license. Former Collingwood president Eddie McGuire supports this bid as the 20th club.

==== Norwood/3rd Adelaide team (1982–) ====
Long standing AFL bidder, SANFL club Norwood made an official bid for the 20th license in 2024. There is speculation that the AFL has been entertaining the idea for some time, with the Norwood Oval hosting AFLW matches and being one of the grounds used during Gather Round, hosting its first AFL matches and drawing large crowds and interest.

==== Bunbury (South West) 3rd WA team (2025-) ====
Bunbury, representing the South West Region, (an area with a growing population of over 170,000 people) made an official license bid in 2025 after Hands Oval was upgraded to AFL standards. The bid is supported by the city's mayor, former Fremantle player and media commentator Paul Hasleby and is proposed as a split model with a new club playing home games between Perth Stadium and a local stadium. In response to interest from the WA government, the AFL offered a 3 year 2 game a year deal for North Melbourne Football Club to play "home" matches at Hands Oval from 2025 with a view of gauging support there. AFL matches there featured the state's two AFL clubs sold out in minutes attracting bumper crowds of 13,000. Sports presenter Ryan Daniels has commented that the arrangement in Bunbury may help WA get a third team.

=== Speculated ===
==== 3rd Perth team ====
A third team in Western Australia, has frequently been speculated by the media. The idea was first floated AFL CEO Andrew Demetriou in 2009. The WAFC and AFL have since stated that their preference is to continue with the two teams in the state

==== Newcastle ====
Newcastle has been suggested as a possible location for an AFL club, mainly due to its large population and its continuous involvement in the sport since 1881. Kevin Sheedy is a notable supporter. A grassroots community organisation was formed in 2024 to develop a foundation for the proposed club and a business case. The proposed team would likely be based in Newcastle and seek to represent regional NSW, with a focus on the Central Coast, Hunter, North Coast and North West NSW regions.

==== Sunshine Coast ====
The Sunshine Coast is often speculated as a possible location for an AFL club. This is frequently cited the media due to the investment by the AFL in the region, including a temporary home for AFLW being located there, with millions spent on upgrading the Maroochydore Multi Sports Complex.
