= Touch match officials =

Touch match officials are responsible for fairly enforcing the Playing Rules of Touch during a match and imposing penalties for deliberate breaches of these rules. The most senior match official is the referee, they may be assisted by a range of other officials depending on the level and rules of the competition.

== Equipment ==
The match officials may use the following equipment:

Coin
The referee organises a coin toss with the team captains to decide who taps off and what end each team takes initially.
Whistle
Referees must carry a whistle to stop play and then signal to players about many things during a game. A referee will let players know when to stop after foul play or while awarding a touchdown and at other times in a game.

== Uniform ==
All referees wear an official uniform of a colour (generally white) distinguishable from those being worn by the two sides playing each other. Referees wear a coloured badge to indicate which level of accreditation they have achieved.

== Accreditation ==
Referees must first pass refereeing exams set by their national governing body before officiating at progressively more senior levels of the sport, gaining experience in lower-level competitions and then moving onto higher-level competitions where they will progress to the top if good enough.

=== Levels ===
Referees are accredited according to a numbered level system, with Level 1 generally being the lowest, introductory, level. The number of levels as well as badge colours, shapes and sizes differ depending on the governing body.
Touch Football Australia operates under a six-level structure while Touch NZ uses a four-level system and Touch Europe uses five.

==== Gold Badge ====
The Gold Badge is the most distinguished badge that can be awarded to a referee and is awarded by the Federation of International Touch. At present, they are awarded to the ten highest ranked referees at the Touch Football World Cup, which is held every four years.

== Refereeing systems ==
Different refereeing systems are in use:

Single Referee
One referee officiates the match, without the help of sideline officials. The single-referee system is usually only used in park-level/social competition where the availability of referees is low.
Dual Referee
Two referees control the match and alternate between the role of central referee and sideline official. The dual-referee system is used only in park-level/social competition where the availability of referees is low.
Triple Referee
Three referees control the match in a similar way to the dual-referee system, with one central referee and a sideline official on each sideline. The triple-referee system is the standard system and is required at all representative levels of the game.

== Positions and responsibilities ==
=== Player safety ===
Referees are to inspect player uniforms, playing boots, jewellery and fingernails to ensure player safety.

=== Tap-off and direction ===
The referees organises a coin toss with the captains of the two teams playing to decide which team taps off and which end they play at from tap-off.

=== Area of control ===
Referees have control over all players and team officials participating in the match, including substitute players. A referee's area of control extends to a general radius of 10 metres from the edge of the field.

=== Referee's signals ===
The referee uses signals to communicate his/her decisions with the players, team officials and spectators.

=== Central Referee and Sideline Officials ===
Generally, matches are controlled by three referees, alternating between the role of central referee and sideline official. The central referee controls play and makes all decisions. Sideline officials are responsible for controlling substituting players, advising the referee of forward passes (through discreet signals), and assisting the central referee in controlling onside defenders. Only the central referee uses his/her whistle.
