= Touch football =

Touch football may refer to:

== Australian rules football ==
- Several variations of Australian rules football are known as touch football
  - Rec footy was a non-contact version of Australian rules football, played from 2003 until 2016

== Gridiron football ==
- Flag football, a non-contact, flag pulling, version of American and Canadian football
- Touch football (American), a variant of American football where players touch rather than tackle opponents

== Rugby ==
- Tag rugby, non-contact, flag pulling, versions of rugby
- Touch rugby, other games derived from rugby football in which players touch rather than tackle opponents

== Rugby league ==
- Touch (sport), a variant of rugby league football in which players touch rather than tackle opponents
- Federation of International Touch, the worldwide governing body for touch football
- National Touch League, the primary Australian national touch competition since 1997
- Touch Football Australia, the national governing body of touch football in Australia

== See also ==
- List of types of football
