= England Touch Association =

English Touch Association
- Established: 1995
- Location: Manchester, England
- Website: England Touch Association

The England Touch Association (ETA) is the national governing body for touch football (touch rugby) within England. It was granted membership to the Federation of International Touch (FIT) on 18 March 1995. The current chief executive officer is Chris Simon.

== History ==
In 2013 the ETA formed a strategic partnership with the RFU's O2 Touch Rugby initiative to develop the sport of Touch Rugby within the UK in the build up to the 2015 Rugby World Cup. In July 2018 England Touch and the RFU announced an updated partnership to grow the game in the lead up to the 2018 European Championships. The ETA submitted a Sport England pre-application document June 2018.

== European Championships ==
The England Touch Association hosted the 2018 European Touch Championships in Nottingham, England. The tournament was covered by the BBC, a milestone for the sport, with England crowned as overall champions. The ETA open men's and women's teams defeated Wales to be crowned champions in their respective divisions, whilst the ETA mixed open team defeated France in the playoffs to earn a bronze medal. The England Touch Association hosted the 2016 European Touch Championships in Holland.

== Touch Football World Cup ==
During the 2011 Touch Football World Cup, hosted in Edinburgh, Scotland, the women's open team came fourth overall, whilst the men's open 30s were silver medalists to Australia. England Touch submitted multiple teams to the 2015 Touch Football World Cup, hosted in Coffs Harbour, Australia, where they lost narrowly to Papua New Guinea in the mixed, open bronze play off, whilst winning their playoffs in the women's 27s, and the mixed 30s, to achieve bronze in both those categories. The 2019 Touch Football World Cup was hosted in Putrajaya on the outskirts of Kuala Lumpur, Malaysia. The ETA men's open team achieved fifth place, defeating the Philippines in their playoff. The open women's team came fifth, winning their final playoff against Papua New Guinea. The ETA mixed open team came sixth behind Wales, whilst, amongst the age group categories, the women's 27 and the women's 35 teams achieved bronze.

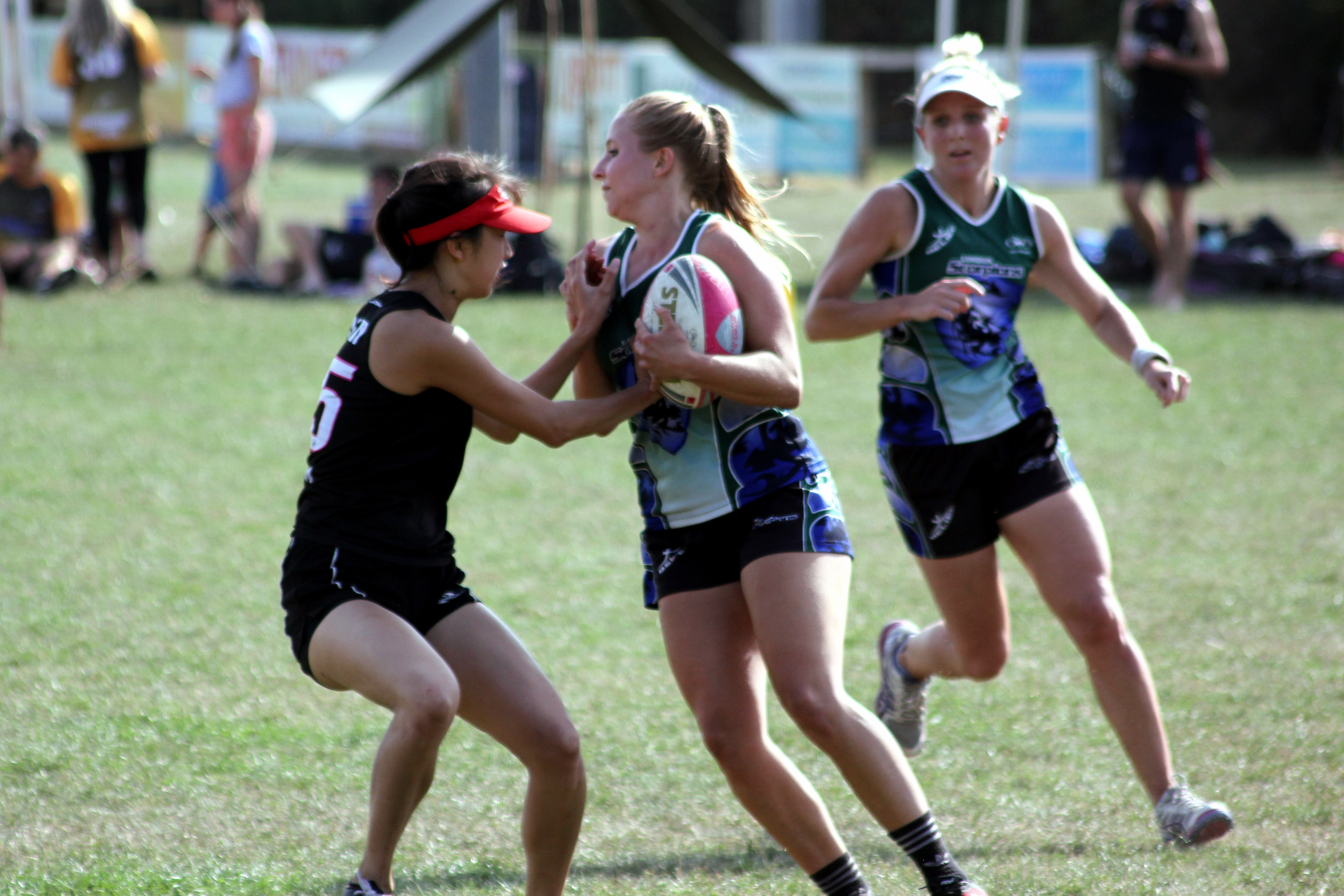
Galaxy Touch London, and London Scorpions Touch, competing in the Women's National Touch Series final, 4 August 2018. Canterbury RFC, England.

== Nationals ==
The 2018 ETA Nationals were hosted at St Ives, Cambridgeshire, in August, with the South East Sharks winning the men's and women's open finals, defeating the North West Blades and the South East Taipans respectively. The mixed open final was won by the South West Saxons who defeated the Midlands Tigers. The 2019 ETA Open Nationals were hosted at St Ives, Cambridgeshire in August, and streamed live on the BBC.

== Rankings ==
At the close of the 2017 season October rankings, and according to FITs ranking policy, the ETA open men's team ranked fifth in the world, with the women's open team placing fourth. As of the close of the 2018 season, and the September rankings, the ETA open men's team have climbed to second on the world rankings, ahead of New Zealand and South Africa, with the women's open team placing third, ahead of Wales. The Federation of International Touch have suspended rankings but as at the last rankings produced in February 2019 the ETA open men were ranked second behind Australia, the women third behind New Zealand, and the ETA mixed open team were ranked fifth behind Papua New Guinea.
