= Touch France =

Governing body of touch rugby in France

- Sport: Touch rugby
- Founded: Grenoble, France (2001)
- No. of teams: 60
- Country: France
- Headquarters: Vence
- Continent: Europe
- Most recent champions: Free Touch (Paris) & Touch Rugby Toulon (Toulon)
- Most titles: Free Touch (Paris)
- Website: touchfrance.fr

Touch France is the governing body of touch rugby in France, created in Grenoble in 2001. It is a member of the Federation of International Touch since 2004.

== Role ==
Touch France aims to encourage and develop touch rugby by applying the rules created by the Federation of International Touch. It manages and regulates the practice of touch and defends the interests of the sport at local, national, and international levels.

== French national teams ==
In the Touch Football World Cup or in the European Championships, France is represented through its national teams.

- XO – Mixed Open
- WO – Women Open
- MO – Men Open
- W27 – Women +27
- M30 – Men +30
- X30 – Mixed +30
- M35 – Men +35
- M40 – Men +40
- X15 – Mixed U15
- X18 – Mixed U18
- G18 – Girls U18

== French Championship ==
The French Championship takes place every year since 2012. It was initially called CFCT, for Championnat de France des clubs de Touch(Touch Club French Championship) and has been known as SuperTouch since 2019. A youth touch championship was formed in 2019, called the Supertouch Academies.

| Year | Category | | | |
| Year | Mixed | Men | U12 | U15 |
|---|---|---|---|---|
| 2012 | Free Touch (Paris) | Free Touch (Paris) | | |
| 2013 | Free Touch (Paris) | Free Touch (Paris) | | |
| 2014 | SMH Blues Touch (Saint-Martin-d'Hères) | Nantes Touch Rugby (Nantes) | | |
| 2015 | SMH Blues Touch (Saint-Martin-d'Hères) | Free Touch (Paris) | | |
| 2016 | SMH Blues Touch (Saint-Martin-d'Hères) | Touch Rugby Toulon (Toulon) | | |
| 2017 | SMH Blues Touch (Saint-Martin-d'Hères) | Touch Roosters 91 (Gif-sur-Yvette) | | |
| 2018 | SMH Blues Touch (Saint-Martin-d'Hères) | Toulouse Touch (Toulouse) | | |
| 2019 | Free Touch (Paris) | Touch Rugby Toulon (Toulon) | Touch Roosters 91 (Gif-sur-Yvette) | Touch Rugby Toulon (Toulon) |

== Main tournaments in France ==
- Winter Touch – Grenoble (Isère)
- Tournoi international de Voglans – Voglans (Savoy)
- 100% Fun Touch – Dourdan (Essonne)
- Riviera Touch – Saint-Laurent-du-Var/Nice (Alpes-Maritimes)
- Spring Touch – Saint-Sébastien-sur-Loire/Nantes (Loire-Atlantique)
- Touch in Paris – Gif-sur-Yvette (Essonne)
- Volcanoes Tournament – Beaumont/Clermont-Ferrand (Puy-de-Dome)
- Elegance Touch (Women Elite Tournament) – Meudon (Hauts-de-Seine)
- Tournoi du Cassoulet – Toulouse (Haute-Garonne)
- Tournoi de Noël – Strasbourg (Bas-Rhin)

== French teams ==
| Name | City |
|---|---|
| Touch Digne – Rugby Club Dignois | Digne-les-Bains (04) |
| Stade Niçois | Nice (06) |
| SBM XV Nice Touch | Nice (06) |
| Touch Azur | Saint-Laurent-du-Var (06) |
| Lynx Rugby | Coursegoules (06) |
| Phoenix touch Rugby Annonay | Annonay (07) |
| Club Aurillac Rugby Touch – CARTouch | Aurillac (15) |
| Atlantique Touch Rochelais | La Rochelle (17) |
| Touch Rebel Union Club Bourges (TRUC) | Bourges (18) |
| Rugby 7 Périgord | Périgueux (24) |
| Toulouse Touch | Toulouse (31) |
| Sau'Touch | Cugnaux (31) |
| Touch Saint Magne | Saint-Magne-de-Castillon (33) |
| Barbarians du Bérange | Sussargues (34) |
| Ratafia Acigné | Acigné (35) |
| Touch Freslon Le Rheu | Le Rheu (35) |
| Touch Grenoble | Grenoble (38) |
| Ass Too Touch | Saint-Martin-d'Uriage (38) |
| RHCP | Montbonnot (38) |
| SMH Blues | Saint-Martin-d'Hères (38) |
| Touch RCTP | Le Touvet (38) |
| Touch Rugby Pont-en-Royans | Pont-en-Royans (38) |
| UATF | Tullins (38) |
| RC Chartreuse Neron | Saint-Égrève (38) |
| Les Touch'eurs | Grenoble (38) |
| Nantes Touch Rugby | Nantes (44) |
| Arrows Nantes Touch | Nantes (44) |
| Purple Touch Rugby | Nantes (44) |
| CJF Rugby Fleury-les-Aubrais | Fleury-les-Aubrais (45) |
| Reims Touch | Reims (51) |
| Touch Calais | Calais (62) |
| Amicale du Touch de l'Ardrésis | Ardres (62) |
| Volcanic Touch | Beaumont/Clermont-Ferrand (63) |
| Clermont Touch | Clermont-Ferrand (63) |
| OuistiTouch Arverne | Clermont-Ferrand (63) |
| Baiona Touch | Bayonne (64) |
| Touch Salses | Salses-le-Château (66) |
| Touch Strasbourg | Strasbourg (67) |
| INSA Strasbourg | Strasbourg (67) |
| Dragon Air Touch 901 | Cleebourg (67) |
| Touch Sélestat Giessen | Sélestat (67) |
| Touch Atout Cœur | Colmar (68) |
| FC Lyon XIII | Lyon (69) |
| Canu Touch | Lyon (69) |
| Touch Voglans | Voglans (73) |
| O'vals Stars | Val d'Europe (77) |
| Touch Pas Au Grisby (TPAG) | Montesson (78) |
| Montauban Rugby Seven | Montauban (82) |
| Touch Rugby Toulon | Toulon, La Crau (83) |
| Rugby Club Dracénois | Draguignan (83) |
| Touch Luby | Villelaure (84) |
| St Sat Touch Rugby | Saint-Saturnin-lès-Avignon (84) |
| Bonkers – Stade Poitevin | Poitiers (86) |
| Griffons de Montaigu | Montaigu (85) |
| Touch Roosters 91 | Gif-sur-Yvette (91) |
| Dourdan Hornets Touch | Dourdan (91) |
| Milly Touch Val's | Milly-la-Forêt (91) |
| Free Touch Rugby | Issy-les-Moulineaux/Paris (92) |
| CdR Hurricanes (ex-Courant d'R) | Châtillon (92) |
| Seventise | Levallois-Perret (92) |
| Red Square Touch Rugby | La Garenne-Colombes (92) |
| Rugby Club de Courbevoie Greyhounds | Courbevoie (92) |
| Sèvres Chavilles Touch | Sèvres (92) |
| CE Safran Massy | Massy (91) |
| Touch Olympique de Nouméa | Nouméa (98) |
| Stade Calédonien Touch Rugby | Nouméa (98) |

== See also ==
- Touch Football Australia
- Touch Football World Cup
