= NTL Player of the Series =

The National Touch League is the peak domestic competition for the sport of Touch Football in Australia. At the completion of each competition, a Player of the Series and Player of the Final is named.

== Player of the Series ==
Note that only recipients for the three open divisions are listed.

=== Men's Open ===
- 1997 - Gavin McDonald, Brisbane City Cobras
- 1998 - Scott Notley, SunWest Razorbacks
- 1999 - Shane Fredricksen, Sydney Scorpions
- 2000 - Craig Madders, Brisbane City Cobras
- 2001 - Kurt Nowotny, Sydney Mets
- 2002 - Gary Sonda, Sydney Mets
- 2003 - Benji Marshall, Gold Coast Sharks
- 2004 - Ash Farrow, SunWest Razorbacks
- 2005 - Drummayne Dayberg-Muir, Gold Coast Sharks
- 2006 - Joel Willoughby, Southern Suns
- 2007 - Drummayne Dayberg-Muir, Gold Coast Sharks
- 2008 - Jason Stanton, Sydney Mets
- 2009 - Dylan Hennessey, Sydney Scorpions
- 2010 - Drummayne Dayberg-Muir, Gold Coast Sharks
- 2011 - Stuart Brierty, Alliance (Elite Eight)
- 2012 - Sam Brisby, Sydney Scorpions
- 2013 - Sam Brisby, NSW Scorpions (Elite Eight)

=== Women's Open ===
- 1997 - Sharyn Williams, Gold Coast Sharks
- 1998 - Gabrielle Maher, Sydney Rebels
- 1999 - Sharyn Martin, Brisbane City Cobras
- 2000 - Bo de la Cruz, Brisbane City Cobras
- 2001 - Gabrielle Maher, Sydney Rebels
- 2002 - Kelly Woods, Brisbane City Cobras
- 2003 - Kelly Woods, Brisbane City Cobras
- 2004 - Louise Winchester, Sydney Mets
- 2005 - Sharyn Williams, Gold Coast Sharks
- 2006 - Shelley Matchem, Barbarians
- 2007 - Amanda Judd, Sydney Mets
- 2008 - Bo de la Cruz, Barbarians
- 2009 - Claire Winchester, Sydney Mets
- 2010 - Peta Rogerson, Sunshine Coast
- 2011 - Peta Rogerson, QLD Pride (Elite Eight)
- 2012 - Leah Percy, Victoria
- 2013 - Emily Hennessey, QLD Chiefs (Elite Eight)

=== Mixed Open ===
- 1997 - Dione Williams, Brisbane City Cobras
- 1998 - Tony El Takchi, Sydney Scorpions
- 1999 - Gary Toohey, Sydney Scorpions
- 2000 - Male: Tony El Takchi, Sydney Scorpions; Female: Sharyn Martin, Brisbane City Cobras
- 2001 - Male: Cameron Costello; Female: Katie Curtis, Brisbane City Cobras
- 2002 - Tony El Takchi, Sydney Scorpions
- 2003 - Yvette Teika, Sydney Scorpions
- 2004 - Male: Matty Mataio, Sydney Mets; Female: Amy Fong, Gold Coast Sharks
- 2005 - Male: Ricky Best, Gold Coast Sharks; Female: Amy Fong, Gold Coast Sharks
- 2006 - Male: Tony El Takchi, Sydney Mets; Female: Jasmin Calicetto, Sydney Mets
- 2007 - Male: Ricky Best, Gold Coast Sharks; Female: Amy Fong, Gold Coast Sharks
- 2008 - Male: Steve Kirby, Southern Suns; Amy Fong, Gold Coast Sharks
- 2009 - Michael Singh, Sydney Mets
- 2010 - Male: Manu Wakely, Sydney Rebels; Female: Sarah Peattie, Sydney Scorpions

== Player of the Final ==
Note that only recipients for the three open divisions are listed.

=== Men's Open ===
- 1997 - Shane Frederiksen, Sydney Scorpions
- 1998 - Shane Frederiksen, Sydney Scorpions
- 1999 - Trent McDonald, Brisbane City Cobras
- 2000 - Mark Boland, Sydney Scorpions
- 2001 - Brent Madders, Brisbane City Cobras
- 2002 - Kurt Nowotny, Sydney Mets
- 2003 - Drummayne Dayberg-Muir, Gold Coast Sharks
- 2004 - Jason Yee, Sydney Mets
- 2005 - Ben Robinson, Gold Coast Sharks
- 2006 - Nathan Jones, Gold Coast Sharks
- 2007 - Jason Stanton, Sydney Mets
- 2008 - Jason Stanton, Sydney Mets
- 2009 - Drummayne Dayberg-Muir, Gold Coast Sharks
- 2010 - John Kennedy, Sydney Scorpions
- 2011 - Nathan Wong, Sydney Scorpions (Elite Eight)
- 2012 - Sam Brisby, Sydney Scorpions
- 2013 - Joel Willoughby, NSW Country Mavericks (Elite Eight)

=== Women's Open ===
- 1997 - Catherine Barr, Brisbane City Cobras
- 1998 - Amanda Judd, Sydney Mets
- 1999 - Sharyn Martin, Brisbane City Cobras
- 2000 - Angela Barr, Brisbane City Cobras
- 2001 - Louise Winchester, Sydney Mets
- 2002 - Rachel Reid, Brisbane City Cobras
- 2003 - Sharyn Martin, Brisbane City Cobras
- 2004 - Teena McIlveen, Gold Coast Sharks
- 2005 - Louise Winchester, Sydney Mets
- 2006 - Renee Murphy, Gold Coast Sharks
- 2007 - Giselle Martin, Sydney Mets
- 2008 - Louise Winchester, Sydney Mets
- 2009 - Nicole McHugh, Sydney Mets
- 2010 - Louise Winchester, Sydney Mets
- 2011 - Louise Winchester, NSW Mets (Elite Eight)
- 2012 - Kirsty Quince, Brisbane City Cobras
- 2013 - Louise Winchester, NSW Mets (Elite Eight)

=== Mixed Open ===
- 1997 - Darren Shelley, Sydney Rebels
- 1998 - Dean Murphy, Sydney Scorpions
- 1999 - Tony El Takchi, Sydney Scorpions
- 2000 - Male: Darren Shelley, Sydney Rebels; Female: Vicki Hansen, Brisbane City Cobras
- 2001 - Male: Craig Slaven, Gold Coast Sharks; Female: Belinda Dawney, Gold Coast Sharks
- 2002 - Christian Frost, Sydney Mets
- 2003 - Tony El Takchi, Sydney Scorpions
- 2004 - Male: Jason Stanton, Sydney Mets; Female: Amy Fong, Gold Coast Sharks
- 2005 - Male: Tony El Takchi, Sydney Mets; Female: Megan Smee, Sydney Mets
- 2006 - Male: Tony El Takchi, Sydney Mets; Female: Jasmin Calicetto, Sydney Mets
- 2007 - Male: Ricky Best, Gold Coast Sharks; Female: Amy Fong, Gold Coast Sharks
- 2008 - Male: Darren Marsh, Southern Suns; Female: Katie Atkins, Brisbane City Cobras
- 2009 - Male: Tony Eltakchi, Sydney Mets; Female: Elin Mortimer, Sydney Mets
- 2010 - Male: Ben Moylan, Sydney Mets; Female: Claudia Kumeroa, Sydney Rebels
- 2011 - Male: Manu Wakely, Sydney Rebels; Female: Amanda Burdett, Sydney Rebels
- 2012 - Male: Roy Prasad, Sydney Rebels; Female: Amy Carr, Sydney Rebels
- 2013 - Male: Jamie Chan, Sydney Rebels; Female: Alyce Hulbert, Brisbane City Cobras
