= Scottish Touch Association =

- Sport: Touch Football
- Jurisdiction: National
- Abbreviation: STA
- Founded: 2005
- Affiliation: FIT

Official website
- touch.scot
- (Scotland)

The Scottish Touch Association (STA) is the national body set up to promote and develop the sport of Touch (also known as Touch Rugby) in Scotland. It is in turn administered by the Federation of International Touch (FIT).

== History ==
Touch has been played in Scotland since 1991 in informal leagues in Edinburgh and Glasgow. The sport soon spread to Aberdeen with a well established league forming soon afterwards.

At Heriot-Watt University, two Sport Science Students, John Houston and Nick Grier, organized an Inter-University Touch Tournament. Originally taking place in the 3rd term '03, the first winners of "The Lopez Cup" came through the group stages unbeaten and won the final convincingly. From humble beginnings of only 8 teams the tournament is now a yearly success with 32 teams registering.

In 2005 the Scottish Touch Association (STA) was formally constituted as the governing body to help develop the sport. By 2007 the association had welcomed new participants from Dundee, Perth and Stirling to join existing leagues, held its first formal national championships, trained over 150 referees and won the tender to host the 2011 World Cup.

The 2011 World Cup was hosted in Edinburgh.
