= Western Reds Touch Football =

Western Reds Touch Football team
Club information
- Short name: Reds
- Founded: September 2000 (first season – 2000/2001)

Current details
- Ground(s): Timbrell Park, Five Dock
- Captain: Gavin Smith & David Forsyth
- Competition: Balmain Touch Association

Records
- Premierships: 0
- Runners-up: 1 (2005/2006)
- Minor premierships: 1 (2020/2021)
- Wooden spoons: 0
- Most capped: 200+ maybe – We've lost count

The Western Reds are a touch football team based in Sydney. They are currently controlled by Jovin Media, and have a team in the Balmain Touch Association competition.

Founded in 2000 as Toongabbie, they entered into the Westmead Touch Association competition for the 2000/2001 season. They continued for two seasons under the name, before rebranding themselves as Western Reds.

== History ==
=== Westmead Competition (2000–2007) ===
The Western Reds touch football team was established in September 2000, and joined the Westmead Touch Association for the 2000/2001 season.

Originally playing under the name of Toongabbie for the first two seasons, they recorded losses of 12–0 and 14–0 consecutively in their first two matches. It would take the team nearly two seasons to win a game, which came late in their second season.

The name Western Reds was voted on for season 2002/2003, to associate the team with their red shirts and western Sydney heritage. Playing under a new name, the Reds narrowly missed a finals berth.

2003/2004 saw a mass exodus of players, with only five of thirteen players re-signing from the previous season. The club recruited a number of key players and, with fresh talent and enthusiasm spearheading the way, played their first ever finals match.

The following three seasons were relatively successful, with finals appearances in each. At the time, 2005/2006 was undoubtedly the club's most successful season, which included several big wins, and a Grand Final appearance.

2006/2007 saw a change in the club's jersey. Gone were the original plain red tee's, replaced by a more professional looking tri-colour shirt which included white with black stripes. The Reds also farewelled veterans Steven Dearth and Brendon Solomons after six seasons of service.

=== Balmain Competition (2007–present) ===
Making a move to the inner west, season 2007/2008 saw the team compete in the Balmain Association, a move welcomed by players and fans alike. The season provided mixed results, as the boys struggled to find their feet in the superior competition, which was highlighted by a record 23–2 loss.

2008/2009 signified a huge turn around for the Reds, with a number of solid results on the field including a 17–0 win. Luke Foord scored 23 tries, whilst the team returned to semi-finals football after finishing 3rd on the ladder.

Season 2009/2010 marked the 10th season of the Western Reds. The team commemorated the achievement with a new playing strip, logo and website. The Reds also announced sponsorship deals with Paramount Lawyers and Jovin Media and took on a squad of 15 full-time players. Despite being bundled out of the semi's, the Reds had completed their most successful season in their 10-year history, with 9 wins (including 6 in a row), and 113 team tries.

The Red's managed to complete season 2010/2011 on top of the table for the first time. But despite finishing 1st, history repeated itself when the Reds crashed out of the semi's for the third season in a row. A number of records were set during the season, including the Reds biggest ever win (22–4), whilst Pete Brouwer broke Luke Foord's try scoring record in the final game, with 25 tries for the season.

Seasons 2011/2012 and 2012/2013 were stop-start affairs, with the Reds struggling to gain any momentum due to several wash outs and opposition forfeits. With an inconsistent playing roster, the Reds adopted an aggressive recruitment drive, as nine rookies were added to the team list over the two seasons. 2012/2013 saw 21 players take the field for the Reds, the largest playing roster in the team's history.

Season 2020/2021 saw the Reds play through the Covid-19 Pandemic. Sanitising the ball after each pass proved to be a slow process, but after learning that clean balls are good balls, the Reds managed to play to their full potential, and take out the Minor Premiership in the Mens Summer Div 3 Wednesday Competition (otherwise known as the lowest losers comp). Played 14 / Won 8 / Drew 2 / Lost 4

A 6-3 win over FiveDock Dockers Men in the Prelim Final saw the Reds propelled straight into the Grand Final.

The Grand Final vs Fitness Last was played on Sunday 7 March 2021 in front of a sellout Timbrell Park crowd.

=== New Sponsorship and Jersey (2016–present) ===
2016 saw a new multi-hundred dollar sponsorship deal with The Smoking Barrels Barbecue. Along with the deal came new jerseys replacing the old strip and also saw the end to the Reds partnership with Paramount Lawyers. Western Reds management we're also able to re-sign several key member including captain Gavin Smith, staving off retirement, along with locking in new talent, wingers Brett Thorley and Jacob Riley.

The Smoking Barrels Barbecue sponsorship was terminated by The Western Reds in 2017, due to unprofessional dealings that the Reds wished to distance themselves from.

The 2018/19 season sees captain Gavin Smith once again pull on the jersey for a record 19th season to steer the team around the park.

In 2019/2020, the Reds 20th Season, a commemorative 20th season jersey was introduced. This is the Reds current playing jersey. The Reds were not sponsored due to the pandemic in the 2020/2021 season, their most successful season in 21 years.

Joel Riley is really Keith Galloway...

== Players ==
=== Current squad ===
Western Reds
First team squad		Coaching staff
Evan Cariola; Scott Munro; Ryan Williams; David Forsyth (C); Jimmy Norris; Dave Tyler; Seth Beckenham	Nick Riddle; Joel Riley; Gavin Smith (C); Andrew Dickinson; Lachlan Coles; Steve Arani; Jared Riley	Head coach: N/A; Assistant coach: N/A; Legend: (c) Captain(s); (vc) Vice-captain(s)

== Club records ==
Biggest Win

- 18 tries, 22–4 against The Tweeds – Round 7, 2010/2011

Biggest Loss

- 21 tries, 2–23 against Dark Horses – Round 5, 2007/2008

Most Consecutive Wins

- 6 matches, Rounds 4 to 9, 2009/2010

Most Consecutive Loses

- 19 matches, Round 1, 2000/2001 to Round 7, 2001/2002

Most Matches

- 160 – Gavin Smith (2000–2013)
- 128 – David Forsyth (2001–2013)
- 112 – Andrew Dickinson (2003–2013)

Most Tries

- 109 – Gavin Smith
- 84 – Lachlan Coles
- 74 – Luke Foord

Most Tries in a Season

- 25 – Peter Brouwer (2010/2011)

Most Tries in a Match

- 9 – Ty Morgan (2005/2006)

== See also ==
- Touch football (disambiguation)

== Sources/References ==
- redstouch.com
- The Western Reds Touch Football Record Book by Gavin Smith
