= 2018 NRL Touch Premiership season =

- League: NRL Touch Premiership
- Teams: 6

The 2018 NRL Touch Premiership season is the inaugural season of the NRL Touch Premiership in Australia, and coincided with matches in the 2018 NRL season. The premiership was launched in partnership with Touch Football Australia and the National Rugby League, and was made up of a three round regular season split into two conferences - Queensland and New South Wales - with the first-placed teams in both conferences progressing to the grand final.

== Teams ==
The premiership included six teams in its inaugural season, extracted from the 2018 Elite 8 Series. Each team was aligned to a current NRL club, and was made up of players selected by Queensland Touch Football and NSW Touch Football based on their performances at the 2018 National Touch League.

Colours	Team	NRL-Aligned Club	Season	Home ground	Men's				Women's			
Colours	Team	NRL-Aligned Club	Season	Home ground	Head Coach	Assistant Coach	Manager	Captain(s)	Coach	Assistant Coach	Manager	Captain(s)
	QLD Cowboys	North Queensland Cowboys	1st season	1300SMILES Stadium	Phil Gyemore	Tim Villalba	Justin Mitchell	Daniel Withers	Swain Rovelli	Mitch Smith	Anita Hagarty	Rylie Seamark
	QLD Titans	Gold Coast Titans	1st season	Cbus Super Stadium	Chris Loth	Tristan Mana	Brendan Jones	Peter Norman	Renee Murphy	Leasha Thouard	Brenda Rackemann	Marikki Watego, Ashleigh Kearney
	QLD Broncos	Brisbane Broncos	1st season	Suncorp Stadium	Jason Boyd	John Beesley	Tyrone Bruce		Lucas Feldman	Craig Morrow	Michael Baartz	
	Parramatta Eels	Parramatta Eels	1st season	ANZ Stadium	Mark Boland	Jason Martin	Ricky Hetherington		Barry Gibson	Anthony Dudeck	Christian Browne	
	Newcastle Knights	Newcastle Knights	1st season	McDonald Jones Stadium	Joel Willoughby	Karley Banks	Andrew Wise		Michael Moussa	Brooke Playford	Sheralee Langbridge	
	Wests Tigers	Wests Tigers	1st season	ANZ Stadium	Tony Trad	Dave Nolan	Robert Barakat		Paul Sfeir	Matt Scranage	Kim Solman	

== Regular season ==
The regular season was broken into two conferences, consisting of three teams each - Cowboys, Titans, and Broncos in the Queensland conference and Eels, Knights, and Tigers in the NSW conference.

=== Round 1 ===
Conference	Home	Away	Venue	Date	Men's			Women's		
Conference	Home	Away	Venue	Date	Time	Score	Referees	Time	Score	Referees
NSW	Parramatta Eels	Wests Tigers	ANZ Stadium	Friday, 18 May	3:55 pm	4-7	Kim Skelly* Tony Calabria* Robert Bowen*	4:40 pm	4-3	Kim Skelly Tony Calabria Luke Saldern*
QLD	QLD Cowboys	QLD Titans	1300SMILES Stadium	Saturday, 19 May	3:05 pm	7-4	Luke McKenzie* Brett Freshwater* Michael Littlefield*	3:50 pm	5-8	Luke McKenzie Brett Freshwater Denise Weier*

=== Round 2 ===
Conference	Home	Away	Venue	Date	Men's			Women's		
Conference	Home	Away	Venue	Date	Time	Score	Referees	Time	Score	Referees
NSW	Newcastle Knights	Parramatta Eels	McDonald Jones Stadium	Saturday, 30 June		5-4	David Baggio, Tony Calabria, Kim Skelly		4-3	Kim Skelly, Rob Bowen, Luke Saldern
QLD	QLD Broncos	QLD Cowboys	Suncorp Stadium	Saturday, 30 June		7-2	Anthony Smith, Brad Smith, Luke McKenzie		4-3	Anthony Smith, Brad Smith, Amanda Sheeky

=== Round 3 ===
Conference	Home	Away	Venue	Date	Men's			Women's		
Conference	Home	Away	Venue	Date	Time	Score	Referees	Time	Score	Referees
QLD	QLD Titans	QLD Broncos	Cbus Super Stadium	Sunday, 15 July		2-0			7-8	
NSW	Wests Tigers	Newcastle Knights	ANZ Stadium	Saturday, 21 July		4-3			9-5	

(*) Denotes referee debut

== Grand final ==
The grand final is played between the first-placed team in the Queensland conference, and the first-placed team in the New South Wales conference.

	QLD Conference Team	Score	NSW Conference Team	Venue	Date	Time	Referees
Women's	QLD Broncos	2-4	Wests Tigers	Cbus Super Stadium	Saturday, 29 July	noon	Tony Calabria Brett Freshwater Amanda Sheeky
Men's	QLD Broncos	6-5	Wests Tigers	Cbus Super Stadium	Saturday, 29 July	12:45 pm	David Baggio Kim Skelly Luke McKenzie
