= NRL Touch Premiership =

- Current season or competition: 2018 NRL Touch Premiership Season
- Sport: Touch Football
- Instituted: 2018
- Inaugural season: 2018
- Number of teams: 8
- Region: Australia (Touch Football Australia (TFA))
- Premiers: QLD Broncos (2018)
- Most titles: QLD Broncos (1 title)
- Website: touchfootball.com.au
- Broadcast partner: Fox League
- Related competition: National Touch League; National Rugby League

The NRL Touch Premiership is the defunct national domestic touch football competition in Australia. It was formed in 2018, through a partnership between its governing body, Touch Football Australia (TFA), and the National Rugby League (NRL). The premiership includes a separate men's and women's competition, and features elite touch football players from around Australia, many of which are current Australian representatives.

== History ==
Through the NRL Touch Football partnership between Touch Football Australia (TFA) and the National Rugby League (NRL), a national elite touch football competition was proposed to commence in 2018. It was agreed to replace the existing Elite 8 division from the National Touch League, with an initial six teams being chosen to enter the new competition.

The first season of the NRL Touch Premiership commenced with games in the first round played on May 18, 2018, at Sydney's Stadium Australia, and May 19, 2018, at Townsville's Willows Sports Complex, prior to the scheduled Round 11 games of the 2018 NRL season.

== Teams ==
The inaugural teams aligned to existing National Rugby League (NRL) clubs consisted of six clubs:
There were three from Queensland (Broncos, Cowboys, and Titans) and three more from New South Wales (Eels, Knights, and Tigers).
An expansion of the premiership was announced on October 5, 2018 to include the New Zealand Warriors, and followed on November 2, 2018 by an announcement that the Sydney Roosters would also field teams, bringing the total clubs to eight for the 2019 season.

| Colours | NRL Touch Team | NRL-aligned Club | Home Venue | City/Town | Suburb/s | Year Joined |
|---|---|---|---|---|---|---|
| | North Queensland Cowboys | Cowboys | Willows Sports Complex | Townsville | Kirwan | 2018 |
| | Brisbane Broncos | Broncos | Brisbane Football Stadium | Brisbane | Milton | 2018 |
| | Gold Coast Titans | Titans | Gold Coast Football Stadium | Gold Coast | Robina | 2018 |
| | Newcastle Knights | Knights | Newcastle International Sports Centre | Newcastle | New Lambton | 2018 |
| | Parramatta Eels | Eels | Stadium Australia | Sydney | Homebush | 2018 |
| | Wests Tigers | Tigers | Stadium Australia | Sydney | Homebush | 2018 |
| | New Zealand Warriors | Warriors | Mount Smart Stadium | Auckland | Auckland | 2019 |
| | Sydney Roosters | Roosters | Sydney Cricket Ground | Sydney | Moore Park | 2019 |

== Rules ==
The NRL Touch Premiership is played under the standard touch football playing rules, as set by Touch Football Australia, with minor variations to accommodate venue and broadcast partnerships.

=== Variations ===
==== Field of Play ====
The field size is slightly reduced to be 60 meters long by 48 meters wide. A standard-sized touch football field is 70 meters long by 50 meters wide.

Corner posts are located at the intersection of the scoreline and sideline, and a small rectangular marker is located on the sideline, five meters in-field from the scoreline, to indicate the 5 metre line.

==== Match Length ====
Each match will be played in two halves of fifteen minutes duration, with a two-minute half-time break.

==== Drawn Matches ====
Should scores be level at the conclusion of normal time, the match will proceed into an extra time period of three minutes. Both teams will immediately have their on-field playing strength reduced to three players and the team that won the toss prior to the commencement of the match will receive possession of the ball and commence play with a tap on the centre of the half-way line.

If the team receiving first possession scores a touchdown within their first set, the touchdown is awarded and the opposing team receives possession and re-commences play with a tap at the centre of halfway.

If the opposing team fails to score within their replying set, the first team to score will be declared the winner.

However, if the opposing team does score, the touchdown is awarded and play is recommenced by the initial team to score. The next team to score after this point will be declared the winner.

If the score remains level after three minutes of extra time, the match will be declared a draw.

== Match Officials ==
Match officials are appointed by Touch Football Australia, under the guidance of National High-Performance Referees Coach, Ian Matthew.

In 2019, with the addition of the New Zealand Warriors, all games in New Zealand will have their match officials appointed by Touch New Zealand, under the guidance of Stu McDonald.

Graded Match Officials
| Graded No. | Match Official | Debut | | |
| Graded No. | Match Official | Date | Match | Venue |
|---|---|---|---|---|
| 1 | Kim Skelly | 18/05/2018 15:55 UTC+10:00 | MEN'S: Eels v Tigers | ANZ Stadium, Sydney |
| 2 | Tony Calabria | 18/05/2018 15:55 UTC+10:00 | MEN'S: Eels v Tigers | ANZ Stadium, Sydney |
| 3 | Rob Bowen | 18/05/2018 15:55 UTC+10:00 | MEN'S: Eels v Tigers | ANZ Stadium, Sydney |
| 4 | Luke Saldern | 18/05/2018 16:30 UTC+10:00 | WOMEN'S: Eels v Tigers | ANZ Stadium, Sydney |
| 5 | Luke McKenzie | 19/05/2018 15:05 UTC+10:00 | MEN'S: Cowboys v Titans | 1300 Smiles Stadium, Townsville |
| 6 | Brett Freshwater | 19/05/2018 15:05 UTC+10:00 | MEN'S: Cowboys v Titans | 1300 Smiles Stadium, Townsville |
| 7 | Michael Littlefield | 19/05/2018 15:05 UTC+10:00 | MEN'S: Cowboys v Titans | 1300 Smiles Stadium, Townsville |
| 8 | Denise Weier | 19/05/2018 15:50 UTC+10:00 | WOMEN'S: Cowboys v Titans | 1300 Smiles Stadium, Townsville |
| 9 | Luke Heckendorf | 28/07/2018 16:50 UTC+10:00 | MEN’S: Tigers v Knights | ANZ Stadium, Sydney |

=== 2018 Referee Squad ===
- David Baggio
- Roberto Bowen
- Tony Kebabria
- Brett Freshwater
- Luke Heckendorf
- Luke McKenzie
- Luke Saldern
- Christopher Schwerdt
- Amanda Sheeky
- Kim Skelly
- Anthony Smith
- Brad Smith
- Denise Weier
- Michael Littlefield

=== 2019 NZ Referee Squad ===
Note that these referees will only officiate Warriors home games.

- Tony Arnel
- Ray Cairns
- Isaac Cosson
- Caleb Downes
- John Dustow
- Logan Forrester
- Taneshia Gill
- Kurt Harrison
- Richie Heap
- Caitlin Kimpton
- Ben Matthews
- Cameron McDonald-Pietersen
- Alisha Ruaiti
- Dali Tui-Taylor
- Harley Wall
- Thomas Webster
- Miah Williams
- John Wright

== Broadcast ==
Within Australia, all matches are broadcast on Fox Sports Australia's Fox League channel, Kayo Sports Streaming Service and Sky Sports NZ through a mix of live and delayed telecasts.

== See also ==
- Touch Football Australia
- National Touch League
- National Rugby League
