= Prospect Vale Park =

Sports and recreation precinct in Tasmania, Australia

- Interactive map of Prospect Vale Park
- Location: 2 Harley Parade, Prospect Vale, Tasmania, Australia
- Coordinates: 41.48646°S 147.12251°E
- Area: 9.5 ha (23 acres)
- Owner: Meander Valley Council
- Operator: Meander Valley Council

Prospect Vale Park, also known as Prospect Park, is a multi-use sporting and recreational precinct in Prospect Vale, near Launceston, Tasmania, Australia. The council-managed park provides facilities for association football, Australian rules football and touch football, alongside public recreation areas. Its sporting users include Launceston City Football Club and the Prospect Hawks Junior Football Club.

== Location and facilities ==
Prospect Vale Park is located at 2 Harley Parade, Prospect Vale, within the Meander Valley Council local government area. Meander Valley Council's 2012 development plan described the reserve as a 9.5-hectare (23-acre) regional sporting facility with association football pitches, an Australian rules football oval and touch football fields.

The park also provides a playground, walking and cycling paths, outdoor exercise equipment, cricket practice nets, picnic facilities and public toilets. The main soccer ground is at the northern end of the precinct, adjoining the Australian Italian Club.

== History ==
=== Establishment of the soccer ground ===
Plans for new soccer facilities for Juventus were reported by The Mercury on 20 April 1977. The newspaper reported that the club and the Australian Italian Club were planning a $200,000 sporting complex in Launceston, incorporating a soccer ground and clubrooms. Juventus president Tom Strickland indicated that the club would upgrade its existing ground if the proposed facilities were not ready for the commencement of the 1978 State Soccer League.

In 1978, Juventus entered the newly established statewide football competition under the name Launceston Juventus and relocated to newly developed association football facilities at Prospect Vale. Working with the Australian Italian Club, members and volunteers developed the playing ground and associated facilities. Former Juventus player and administrator Peter Mies was involved in securing the land and establishing the club's new home. Volunteers helped to clear and prepare the site, including its playing surface and change-room facilities.

Contemporary advertising published in The Examiner on 1 April 1978 announced the grand opening of the Prospect Soccer Complex by Juventus Soccer Club at 2 pm that day. The opening was scheduled to coincide with the inaugural round of the Radio Rentals State Soccer League, with Launceston Juventus due to host Caledonians at Prospect at 2:30 pm.

According to Launceston City FC, Meander Valley Council acquired the Prospect Vale Park sporting grounds from the Australian Italian Club in 2005; the club subsequently hired its playing grounds from the council.

=== Development of the precinct ===
Meander Valley Council adopted a long-term development plan for Prospect Vale Park in 2012. It addressed the condition and capacity of playing grounds, lighting, parking, access and informal recreation facilities.

In March 2021, the council announced completion of a $750,513 upgrade to the park's training grounds, including works to improve drainage, irrigation and playing surfaces. The Australian Government contributed $700,000 through its Community Development Grants Programme, with the balance funded by the council.

On 15 September 2024, a new change-room facility at Launceston City's ground was formally opened and named the Peter Mies Pavilion, honouring Mies's longstanding contribution to Tasmanian football and the establishment of the ground.

Council road and parking improvements continued during 2026. In October that year, Meander Valley Council announced the second stage of an internal road reconfiguration, including additional parking, with works scheduled to continue into February 2027.

== Sports and events ==
The soccer facilities have been used by Launceston City for senior, junior and women's football, including home matches in the statewide National Premier Leagues Tasmania competition, previously known as the Victory League. The Australian rules football facilities are used by the Prospect Hawks Junior Football Club, while the park also accommodates touch football competitions.

Prospect Vale Park was designated as the venue for the 2026 Tasmanian Touch Football State Cup, scheduled for 14 and 15 February with junior and senior divisions competing over the same weekend.

== Naming rights ==
Commercial naming rights have applied to individual sports grounds within Prospect Vale Park rather than to the entire precinct. The main soccer ground was known as Mitsubishi Park for more than 15 years before a 2017 proposal to adopt the name Buckby Land Rover Park under a new sponsorship agreement. The venue was subsequently referred to as Buckby Motors Park.

In 2024, Launceston City announced TassieCare Park as the sponsored name of its home ground. Football Tasmania used the sponsored name Community Bank Deloraine & Districts Park in its 2026 match listings.

== See also ==
- Australian Italian Club
- Launceston City FC
- Prospect Vale, Tasmania
