= Touch rugby =

Derivatives of rugby league involving touching instead of tackling

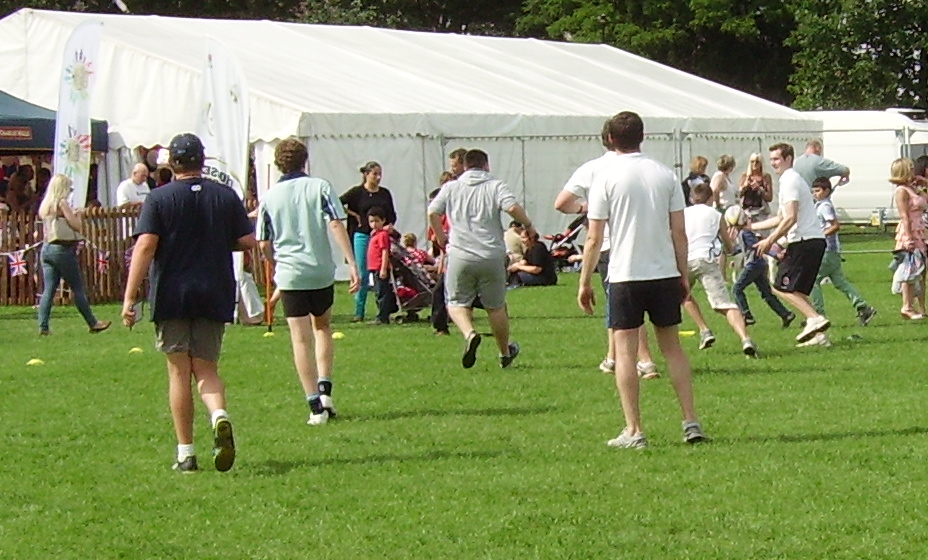
Touch rugby being played at the 2012 Bedford River Festival.

Touch rugby is a family of games derived from rugby league in which players do not tackle each other but instead touch their opponents using their hands on any part of the body, clothing, or the ball.

A formal, competitive variety, known as Touch, developed from rugby league and now exists as a sport in its own right. In addition, touch rugby games are played as training activities for rugby league and rugby union; as safer variants of rugby, particularly in schools and junior clubs, and as an informal social sport.

== Features ==
Touch rugby has a number of differences from the traditional games, including its simplicity (it requires very little equipment or goalposts), its ease of learning, and the decreased likelihood of injury. As a result, it is a popular social game; mixed-gender and women-only games are also very popular in the UK, where touch rugby is played in many popular centres around England and Scotland. Touch Rugby League is a growing competition in Australia. Touch rugby is also gaining popularity in the United States. The USA Touch association hosts an annual national championship. In 2019, 27 clubs from cities across the USA registered teams into six competitive divisions. The sport is known as "Touch" in many parts of the world.

Beach touch is also popular. Social touch games in South Africa are played barefoot, while 1-touch or six down is played with cleats that have no more than 10 studs on each foot.

Since 1988, the Federation of International Touch has organized nine World Cup championships. Typically, Australia and New Zealand have dominated as champions and runners-up in each of the now 11 competitive divisions. Every four years, a member country is selected to host the tournament. In 2019, the World Cup was hosted in Kuala Lumpur, Malaysia and welcomed 28 participating nations. The 2024 FIT World Cup was hosted in Nottingham, England at the University of Nottingham. The 2024 FIT World Cup had 4,000 players from 39 nations competing in 187 teams across 13 categories. The 2028 FIT World Cup host country is New Zealand.

== Rule variations ==
The most popular, codified form of touch rugby is derived from rugby league and features two teams of six players. Played under the auspices of the Federation of International Touch (FIT), it is officially known as Touch, and is also called touch football, particularly in Australia, and sometimes 'six down' or 'sixes' in South Africa. FIT rules have become the most common rules used both in FIT-sanctioned competitions and informal games of touch rugby. A version of the FIT rules known as one touch in South Africa features a change of possession after a single touch rather than the six in the league-derived game.

League tag is a semi-contact version of rugby league. It was used initially as a coaching aid to get players new to rugby league in Ireland used to the play-the-ball, retreating to an onside line, and upper body tackling that stops the ball being passed in the tackle. It was formally codified in 2008 at University College Cork. It allows ball carriers to hold off defenders, and defenders to grab the ball carrier in their bid to touch the ball. Touching the ball effects a tackle.

Other versions of touch rugby are not fully codified. For example, as an activity for fitness and skills training, and to reduce the risk of injury, rugby players will sometimes play touch rugby based on modified rugby rules. One common variation is that a fair touch must be below the waist, or, with two hands, or, to encourage rucking, a small non-contact ruck may be formed when a player is "touched". The "touched" player must fall to the ground as he would if he were tackled, and then two players from the attacking team must "ruck" over him within three seconds to keep possession of the ball. A scrum-half then recovers the ball, and play continues.

Touch rugby is often played informally, rather like a pick-up soccer or basketball game. In addition to tackles being replaced by touches, the rules of both rugby codes are simplified, removing elements such as scrums, rucks, mauls, line-outs and kicks.

In the United States, Touch Rugby is usually played following pre-1967 rugby league rules, minus kicking. Players being touched with two hands must place the ball down or play the ball at the spot of the "tackle," and the defensive team must retreat 5 yards or meters. There is often no tackle count, meaning that almost the only way that the defence can obtain the ball is through offensive mistakes. Whenever an offensive infraction occurs (ball into touch, knock-on, or forward pass), the defence receives a tap-kick at the spot of the infraction. Teams switch sides after each try is scored, and the team scoring the try kicks off from the half point.

Until 2003/2004 the English RFU in its junior development program called The Three Stages of the Rugby Continuum encouraged the playing of Non-contact/touch rugby in its under-eights competition, although now promotes Mini Tag instead.

== See also ==
- Touch football (rugby league)
- Tag Rugby
- League tag
- Touch football (American)
