= Touch Football – Australian Nationals =

The Australian National Championships was a touch football competition between the Australian states which ran from 1980 to 1995. The finals of this competition were almost always played between Queensland and New South Wales, the two most dominant touch playing states, with the Australian Capital Territory also performing strongly. The 'one sided' nature of the competition was the major reason for its replacement by the National Touch League format from 1997.

== Results of the National Championships - 1980 to 1995 ==
Year	Venue	Men's Open	Women's Open	Mixed Open	Men's U20s	Women's U20s	Men's 30s	Men's 35s	Men's 40s	Men's 45s	Women's 27s	Women's 30s	Juniors
1980	Gold Coast	NSW	NSW	-	-	-	-	NSW	-	-	-	-	-
1982	Canberra	NSW / ACT	NSW	-	-	-	-	NSW	-	-	-	-	-
1983	Hobart	NSW	NSW	-	-	-	-	QLD	-	-	-	-	NSW / ACT
1984	Sydney	NSW	NSW	-	-	-	-	NSW	-	-	-	-	NSW
1985	Melbourne	QLD	NSW	NSW	-	-	NSW / ACT	NSW	-	-	-	-	NSW
1986	Adelaide	NSW	NSW	NSW	-	-	NSW	NSW	NSW	-	-	-	QLD
1987	Perth	NSW	NSW	NSW	-	-	NSW	QLD	NSW	-	-	-	-
1988	Gold Coast	QLD	QLD	NSW	-	-	QLD	QLD	NSW	-	NSW	-	QLD
1990	Darwin	QLD	NSW	NSW-	-	-	NSW	NSW	NSW	-	QLD	-	-
1991	Canberra	NSW	NSW	NSW	-	-	NSW	NSW	NSW	-	QLD	-	-
1992	Hobart	QLD	NSW	NSW	-	-	NSW	QLD	NSW	-	QLD	-	-
1993	Sydney	NSW	QLD	NSW	-	-	QLD	NSW	NSW	-	-	-	-
1994	Gold Coast	NSW	NSW	NSW	QLD	QLD	NSW	QLD	NSW	NSW	-	-	-
1995	Gold Coast	QLD	NSW	NSW	NSW	QLD	QLD	QLD	NSW	QLD	-	NSW	-

== See also ==
- Federation of International Touch
