= Arabian Gulf Rugby Football Union =

Arabian Rugby Union governing body

- Sport: Rugby union
- Founded: 1974
- World Rugby affiliation: 1990–2010
- Men's coach: Bruce Morton
- Women's coach: Vanessa Lloyd

Map of the Gulf Cooperation Council area

The Arabian Gulf Rugby Football Union (AGRFU) was the governing body for rugby union that represented the Gulf Cooperation Council states until the end of 2010. As well as organising local and regional competitions in UAE, Bahrain, Saudi Arabia, Kuwait and Oman, the AGRFU administered representative Arabian Gulf rugby teams and hosted the annual Dubai round of the Sevens World Series and 2009 Rugby World Cup Sevens in Dubai.

== History ==
Rugby in the Arabian Peninsula was first played in the 1940s by the British military and expatriate oil workers in Kuwait. By 1974, rugby clubs had also been established in UAE (Abu Dhabi, Dubai, Ras Al Khaimah and Sharjah), Saudi Arabia (Dhahran), Qatar (Doha), and Bahrain. The GRFU (Gulf Rugby Football Union) was founded in that year, under the umbrella of the English RFU along with a referees association. To begin with, many matches were played on sand but today almost all are played on grass pitches.

The AGRFU was formed in 1989 with the emphasis being on the Union being the Arabian Gulf and, in its own right, became a member of the International Rugby Football Board (now known as World Rugby) in 1990. Through its regional development program, the AGRFU also helped facilitate the entry of Lebanon and Jordan into international rugby. THE AGRFU played in the Hong Kong 7s in 1992 and the Rugby World Cup 7s Qualifying Tournament in Catania, Sicily in 1993, its first representative international competition. This was followed by its first 'home' international against Kenya, held in Dubai, in 1995.

World Rugby's governance restructuring project for the West Asia region resulted in the AGRFU being dissolved at the end of 2010 to allow separate national unions administer the game in each member country. The UAE Rugby Federation was formed in 2009 and the UAE national team inherited the former Arabian Gulf team's world ranking, while separate federations in Qatar and Saudi Arabia became the new sports governing bodies for those countries.

== See also ==
- Rugby union in the Arabian Peninsula
