= Australian Italian Club of Launceston =

Italian-Australian social and cultural club in Launceston, Tasmania

- Formation: 1958
- Founded at: Launceston, Tasmania, Australia
- Type: Social, cultural and sporting club
- Headquarters: 414 Westbury Road, Prospect Vale, Tasmania
- Website: australianitalianclublaunceston.com.au

The Australian Italian Club of Launceston is an Italian-Australian social, cultural and sporting club based in Prospect Vale, Tasmania, a suburb of Launceston, Australia. Established in 1958 as a meeting place for Italian migrants and their families, the club was originally located in George Street in central Launceston before relocating to Westbury Road at Prospect Vale in 1978. Its history includes involvement in the development of facilities for Launceston Juventus and the origins of the annual Festivale event.

== History ==
=== Establishment and early years ===
The club was established in 1958 to provide a place for Italians who had settled in northern Tasmania to meet and maintain social connections. Many of its early members had migrated to Tasmania to work on hydro-electric construction projects.

In a feature published by The Examiner on 9 November 1963, founding members were identified as Pietro Ulliana, Nello Dell'Amico, B. Del Col, I. Rossetto, J. Piccolo and F. Zelesco. The article described how the founders raised funds to acquire the former Masonic Club premises in George Street. The purchase included approximately £3,000 worth of club equipment, and the Italian Government provided a £500 grant. The club initially operated without a liquor licence but subsequently developed a restaurant and licensed social facilities.

In a retrospective published in 1978, Aldo De Santi named Umberto De Cesari as president of the club's first committee and identified P. Ulliana, P. Turian, I. Rossetto, O. Martini, Grigolato, G. Del Pio, F. Freschi and E. Vedovelli among its members.

By November 1963, The Examiner reported that the club had more than 300 members. Although established for the Italian migrant community, its membership also included people of Dutch, German, Polish and Scottish backgrounds. Nello Dell'Amico and Pietro Ulliana assisted newly arrived Italians as interpreters, while the club provided a place for migrants to form friendships and obtain support as they settled in the region.

Pietro Ulliana, the club's founding secretary, was awarded life membership in November 1963. The presentation followed a mass naturalisation ceremony at the Queen Victoria Museum, after which a reception was held at the club's George Street premises. Ulliana, who had arrived in Launceston in 1951 to work on the Trevallyn hydro-electric project, was recognised for his contribution to the organisation. At the time, the club held regular Saturday evening social gatherings.

=== 1975 prime ministerial speaking notes ===
On 24 June 1975, official speaking notes were prepared for Prime Minister Gough Whitlam for an address at the Italian Australian Club in Launceston. The notes discussed the contributions of Italian migrants to Australian society, cultural connections between Australia and Italy, and government policies affecting migrants. Whitlam's comments characterised ethnic clubs as places where traditions from migrants' countries of origin could be maintained alongside participation in Australian community life.

=== Relocation to Prospect Vale ===
During the 1970s, the Australian Italian Club and Launceston Juventus pursued a joint development intended to provide larger social premises and a permanent soccer ground. On 20 April 1977, journalist Gordon Burnett reported in The Mercury that the two organisations planned a $200,000 sporting complex on a site then described as approximately four hectares. The proposal included a soccer ground and clubrooms, with tennis, bowls and squash facilities also envisaged. The report quoted Tommy Strickland, president of Juventus, who said that the existing ground could be upgraded if the new facilities were not ready for the proposed 1978 statewide soccer league.

Work on the project began in October 1977 through cooperation between the Australian Italian Club and Juventus committees. Five hectares of land at Prospect were purchased and a 99-year lease was arranged over a further five adjoining hectares. The club's existing George Street premises were placed on the market as part of the relocation.

By August 1978, De Santi reported that the complex included a fully enclosed soccer ground with temporary lighting, changing rooms with showers, separate amenities for players, officials and spectators, and a large new social club building. Further proposed facilities included tennis courts, a children's playground, a barbecue area and bocce courts. De Santi estimated the project's cost at approximately $250,000 and stated that around 90 per cent of the work had been carried out through voluntary labour, with people from Italian and other migrant communities contributing.

De Santi identified Bruno Carosi as president of the committee directing the development, alongside Renato Di Plotti, Gino Cappellazzo, Antonio Iezzi and Acquarola, with technical advice from Sebastiano Bordin. He also recorded the contributions of Peter Mies, Tom Strickland, Egidio Vedovelli, Aldo De Santi, Raffaelo Casteller, Terry Clark, Alfredo De Angelis, Hans Streit and Luigi Miotto, among others. The article paid tribute to former participants Ivo Rossetto, Renato Ciafardini and Memi Soligo, who had died before the project's anticipated official opening.

The development coincided with Juventus's entry into the inaugural statewide soccer league in 1978. The soccer ground was advertised as the Prospect Soccer Complex for a grand opening on 1 April 1978, ahead of a scheduled league match between Launceston Juventus and Caledonians. De Santi's article, published on 28 August 1978, also referred to a forthcoming official opening of the broader social and sporting complex. The Australian Italian Club relocated from George Street to Westbury Road in the same year.

Former Juventus player and administrator Peter Mies was among those involved in acquiring and developing the site. In its 2025 Hall of Fame profile of Mies, Football Tasmania reported that he had offered his family home as security to help finance the purchase.

== Cultural and community activities ==
=== Festivale ===
The Australian Italian Club was associated with the origins of Festivale, the annual food, music and cultural festival held in Launceston. In an account published in April 2015, Tasmanian parliamentarian Rosemary Armitage dated an initial event at the club to 1987, describing it as an initiative of the club's ladies' committee. Drawing on recollections by committee member Pauline Gaetani, Armitage stated that invitations had been sent to the Governor of Tasmania and the Italian Consul-General and that Italian performers travelled from interstate to participate. The success of the event led to its expansion into central Launceston in 1988 as part of Australia's bicentenary celebrations.

Festivale's official history identifies 1988 as the first year of the festival and acknowledges the preceding multicultural food and social event at the Australian Italian Club. A retrospective in the December 2025–January 2026 issue of Tasmanian Hospitality Review also identified the Australian Italian Club as an early venue, although it dated the event held there to 1988.

=== Social and cultural facilities ===
The club has continued to operate as a venue for community functions, entertainment and social activities. Its facilities have been used for receptions, weddings, fundraising events, dinners and live musical performances, and its activities are open to people of all nationalities.

In 1996, life member Sebastiano Bordin began collecting photographs and historical information about Italian migrants who had arrived in Tasmania during the 1950s, a project subsequently acknowledged in the club's published history.

== Sporting associations ==
The Australian Italian Club has maintained a longstanding association with Launceston Juventus, now Launceston City Football Club. A soccer team originally known as Roma developed alongside Launceston's Italian migrant community in the late 1950s. During Juventus's early years at Coronation Park, players used the Australian Italian Club's George Street premises as changing facilities before travelling to the ground. The two organisations later cooperated in the development of the soccer facilities adjoining the club's Prospect Vale site.

The adjoining Prospect Vale Park subsequently developed into a multi-sport recreational precinct operated by Meander Valley Council, while the Australian Italian Club continued to provide other sporting and social facilities.

The associated AIC Tennis Club was established in 1981 and operates two floodlit hard courts behind the clubhouse, providing social tennis and competition through Tennis North. Other activities at the Australian Italian Club include indoor bowls, pool, darts, boxing and mixed martial arts.

== See also ==
- Italian Australians
- Launceston City FC
- Prospect Vale Park
