= Brisbane City Cobras =

Club information
- Full name: Brisbane City Cobras District Rugby League Football Club
- Nickname(s): The Cobras, City

Current details
- Ground: Quad Park (now Stockland Park), Bokarina
- Competition: National Touch League

The Brisbane City Cobras are a Touch Football club in located in Brisbane, Australia. Despite covering only a relatively small number of local associations, but has performed strongly at national events, in particular the Australian National Touch League.

The Brisbane City Cobras region includes the Redcliffe Touch Association, the Brisbane Metropolitan Touch Association, the UniTouch Association and the Southern Cross Touch Association.

At the National Touch League competition Cobras have captured a number of national titles, most notably in the Women's Open Division.

As a region Cobras have produced Australian Touch Hall of Fame members Terry Jacks (player) and Peter Bell (coaching), Australian coach Gary Madders, as well as notable Australian National representative players Catherine Bell, Angela Barr, Kelly Woods, Katie Curtis, Mary Steele, Trent McDonald, Craig Madders, Gavin McDonald, Shane Duell, Brenton O'Shaunessy and Peter Stoddart.

== See also ==
- NTL Championships
