= History of NTL Championships =

These are results for the National Touch League in Australia.

== National Touch League Results by Year ==
| Year | Men's Open | Women's Open | Mixed Open | Men's u20 | Women's u20 | Senior Mixed | Men's 30 | Women's 30 | Men's 35 | Women's 35 | Men's 40 | Women's 40 | Men's 45 | Men's 50 |
|---|---|---|---|---|---|---|---|---|---|---|---|---|---|---|
| 1997 | Sydney Scorpions def Brisbane City Cobras | Brisbane City Cobras def Sydney Mets | Sydney Rebels def Brisbane City Cobras | Brisbane City Cobras def Gold Coast Sharks | Sunwest Razorbacks def Sydney Rebels | N/A | N/A | N/A | N/A | N/A | N/A | N/A | N/A | N/A |
| 1998 | Sydney Scorpions def SunWest Razorbacks | Sydney Mets def Gold Coast Sharks | Sydney Scorpions def Gold Coast Sharks | Brisbane City Cobras def TQ Cyclones | Gold Coast Sharks def Sydney Mets | N/A | Gold Coast Sharks def Brisbane City Cobras | SunWest Razorbacks def Gold Coast Sharks | Crusaders def Hunter Western Hornets | Sydney Scorpions def Northern Eagles | Southern Suns def SunWest Razorbacks | N/A | Northern Eagles def Hunter Western Hornets | N/A |
| 1999 | Sydney Scorpions def Brisbane City Cobras | Brisbane City Cobras def Gold Coast Sharks | Sydney Scorpions def Sydney Rebels | Sydney Mets def Brisbane City Cobras | Gold Coast Sharks def Sydney Rebels | N/A | Gold Coast Sharks def Sydney Scorpions | Southern Suns def Brisbane City Cobras | Sydney Mets def Crusaders | Sydney Scorpions def Northern Eagles | SunWest Razorbacks def Sydney Mets | N/A | Northern Eagles def Hunter Western Hornets | N/A |
| 2000 | Sydney Scorpions def Brisbane City Cobras | Brisbane City Cobras def Sydney Mets | Brisbane City Cobras def Sydney Rebels | Sydney Mets def Sydney Scorpions | Gold Coast Sharks def Sydney Mets | N/A | Gold Coast Sharks def Sydney Scorpions | Hunter Western Hornets def Southern Suns | Gold Coast Sharks def Sydney Scorpions | Northern Eagles def Sydney Scorpions | Sydney Mets def Sunwest Razorbacks | N/A | Northern Eagles def Sydney Mets | Sydney Rebels def Brisbane City Cobras |
| 2001 | Brisbane City Cobras def Sydney Mets | Sydney Mets def Brisbane City Cobras | Gold Coast Sharks def Brisbane City Cobras | Gold Coast Sharks def Sydney Mets | Gold Coast Sharks def Sydney Rebels | N/A | Sydney Scorpions def Sydney Mets | SunWest Razorbacks def Southern Suns | Crusaders def Sydney Scorpions | Sydney Scorpions def Southern Suns | Sydney Mets def Gold Coast Sharks | Hunter Western Hornets def Gold Coast Sharks | SunWest Razorbacks def Northern Eagles | Gold Coast Sharks def Sydney Mets |
| 2002 | Sydney Mets def Brisbane City Cobras | Brisbane City Cobras def Hunter Western Hornets | Sydney Scorpions def Sydney Mets | Southern Suns def Gold Coast Sharks | Gold Coast Sharks def TQ Cyclones | N/A | Gold Coast Sharks def Sydney Scorpions | SunWest Razorbacks def Gold Coast Sharks | Sydney Scorpions def Crusaders | Sydney Scorpions def Southern Suns | Sydney Mets def Brisbane City Cobra | Hunter Hornets def Gold Coast Sharks | Southern Suns def Sunwest Razorbacks | Sydney Mets def Sydney Rebels |
| 2003 | Gold Coast Sharks def Sydney Mets | Brisbane City Cobras def Sydney Mets | Sydney Scorpions def Gold Coast Sharks | Gold Coast Sharks def Southern Suns | Hunter Hornets def Gold Coast Sharks | N/A | Sydney Mets def Sydney Scorpions | Hunter Western Hornets def Sydney Scorpions | Sydney Mets def Sydney Scorpions | Sydney Scorpions def Southern Suns | Crusaders def Gold Coast Sharks | Northern Eagles def Hunter Western Hornets | Southern Suns def Northern Eagles | Hunter Western Hornets def Gold Coast Sharks |
| 2004 | Sydney Mets def Brisbane City Cobras | Gold Coast Sharks def Brisbane City Cobras | Sydney Mets def Gold Coast Sharks | Sydney Mets def Southern Suns | Gold Coast Sharks def Southern Suns | N/A | Sydney Mets def Sydney Scorpions | Sydney Scorpions def SunWest Razorbacks | Sydney Scorpions def Sydney Mets | Southern Suns def Hunter Western Hornets | Northern Eagles def ACT | Sydney Scorpions def Northern Eagles | Sydney Mets def Northern Eagles | Hunter Western Hornets def Gold Coast Sharks |
| 2005 | Gold Coast Sharks def Sydney Mets | Sydney Mets def Brisbane City Cobras | Sydney Mets def Gold Coast Sharks | Southern Suns def Northern Eagles | Gold Coast Sharks def Brisbane City Cobras | N/A | Sydney Mets def South Queensland Sharks | Crusaders def Sydney Scorpions | Sydney Mets def Sydney Scorpions | Hunter Western Hornets def Southern Suns | Sydney Scorpions def South Queensland Sharks | Sydney Scorpions def North Queensland Cyclones | Brisbane City Cobras def Sydney Mets | Hunter Western Hornets def Sydney Mets |
| 2006 | Gold Coast Sharks def Sydney Mets | Gold Coast Sharks def Sydney Mets | Sydney Mets def Sydney Scorpions | Northern Eagles def South Queensland Sharks | Southern Suns def Brisbane City Cobras | N/A | Sydney Mets def Sydney Scorpions | Southern Suns def Sydney Scorpions | Gold Coast Sharks def Sydney Scorpions | Gold Coast Sharks def Qld Country Rustlers | Sydney Scorpions def Sharks Gold Coast | Sydney Scorpions def Southern Suns | Brisbane City Cobras def Sydney Mets | Qld Country Rustlers def Hunter Western Hornets |
| 2007 | Gold Coast Sharks def Sydney Mets | Brisbane City Cobras def Sydney Mets | Gold Coast Sharks def Hunter Western Hornets | Qld Country Rustlers def Southern Suns | Southern Suns def Brisbane City Cobras | N/A | Southern Suns def Defence Force Warriors | Hunter Western Hornets def Qld Country Rustlers | Gold Coast Sharks def Sydney Scorpions | N/A | Sydney Scorpions def Southern Suns | Gold Coast Sharks def TQ Cyclones | Northern Eagles def Southern Suns | Brisbane City Cobras def Northern Eagles |
| 2008 | Sydney Mets def Gold Coast Sharks | Sydney Mets def Barbarians | Brisbane City Cobras def Southern Suns | Brisbane City Cobras def Sydney Mets | Southern Suns def Brisbane City Cobras | Gold Coast Sharks def Gold Coast Sharks | Sydney Mets def Sydney Scorpions | Victoria def Hunter Western Hornets (*W27s) | N/A | South West Qld def Hunter Western Hornets | Sydney Scorpions def Hunter Western Hornets | Sydney Scorpions defeated Hunter Hornets | Southern Suns def Northern Eagles | Brisbane City Cobras def Sydney Mets |
| 2009 | SQBD Sharks def Sydney Scorpions | Sydney Mets def SQBD Sharks | Sydney Mets def SQBD Sharks | Sydney Mets def Sunshine Coast | Southern Suns def Brisbane City Cobras | Wellington (NZ) def Sydney Scorpions | Canterbury (NZ) def Sydney Scorpions | Hunter Hornets def Southern Suns (*W27s) | N/A | Sth West QLD def SQBD Sharks | Sydney Scorpions def NZ Sharks | N/A | SQBD Sharks def Sydney Scorpions | Southern Suns def Brisbane City Cobras |

== Most successful NTL Permits by division (1997 – 2008) ==
| Permit | Men's Open | Women's Open | Mixed Open | Men's u20 | Women's u20 | Senior Mixed | Men's 30 | Women's 30 | Men's 35 | Women's 35 | Men's 40 | Women's 40 | Men's 45 | Men's 50 | Women's 27s | Total |
|---|---|---|---|---|---|---|---|---|---|---|---|---|---|---|---|---|
| Barbarians | | | | | | | | | | | | | | | | 0 |
| Brisbane City Cobras | 1 | 6 | 2 | 3 | | | | | | | | | 2 | 2 | | 15 |
| Crusaders | | | | | | | | 1 | 2 | | 1 | | | | | 4 |
| Gold Coast Sharks | 4 | 2 | 2 | 2 | 7 | 1 | 4 | | 3 | 1 | | 1 | | 1 | | 27 |
| Hunter Western Hornets | | | | | 1 | | | 3 | | 1 | | 2 | | 3 | | 10 |
| Northern Eagles | | | | 1 | | | | | | 1 | 1 | 1 | 4 | | | 8 |
| NQ Cyclones | | | | | | | | | | | | | | | | 0 |
| Qld Country Rustlers | | | | 1 | | | | | | | | | | 1 | | 2 |
| Southern Suns | | | | 2 | 3 | | 1 | 2 | | 1 | 1 | | 3 | | | 13 |
| South West Queensland | | | | | | | | | | 1 | | | | | | 1 |
| Sydney Mets | 3 | 4 | 3 | 3 | | | 5 | | 3 | | 3 | | 1 | 1 | | 26 |
| Sydney Rebels | | | 1 | | | | | | | | | | | 1 | | 2 |
| Sydney Scorpions | 4 | | 4 | | | | 1 | 1 | 2 | 5 | 4 | 4 | | | | 25 |
| Sunwest Razorbacks | | | | | 1 | | | 3 | | | 1 | | 1 | | | 6 |
| Victoria | | | | | | | | | | | | | | | 1 | 1 |
