= Rugby in Oman =

The logo of Oman Rugby, the governing body for rugby in Oman.

The history of rugby in Oman dates back to the 1970s. Initially a minor sport played locally and by expatriates, rugby has since gained prominence. The Oman Rugby Committee is the sport's national governing body, and was founded in 2021. In the same year, Oman Rugby joined Asia Rugby as an associate member, and Muscat Rugby Club, a founding member of the Arabian Gulf Rugby Football Union, celebrated its 50th anniversary. In 2024, the country's first touch rugby club was launched as part of the Mehlah Sports Club.

== 2024 Touch World Cup ==
In April 2024, the Oman Rugby Committee announced that Oman would participate in the 2024 Touch Rugby World Cup in Nottingham; this would be the first time Oman participated in an international rugby tournament. Prior to that, the team faced the UAE and the Philippines in friendly matches, and participated in a local game in Abu Dhabi. Oman finished 16th in the world cup, winning one out of eight matches.
