= League tag =

League Tag is the name of two distinct modified version of rugby league football. Both versions of League Tag maintain the basic structure of rugby league, and replace physical tackling with an alternate means to end each play.

The northern hemisphere version of League Tag was developed the rugby league club of University College Cork in Ireland, whilst the southern hemisphere version was created by the New South Wales Country Rugby League in Australia, with the international laws now overseen by the National Rugby League.

== League Tag (Australia) ==
League Tag (Australia) replaces tackling with the removal of one of two tags carried on an opponent's hips, attached directly to specific League Tag shorts with Velcro patches, but otherwise retains almost all other rules of traditional rugby league (such as kicking). A number of additional rules are also added relating to the specific issues associated with a tag based game.

=== Origin ===
League Tag (Australia) was developed by the Western Australian Rugby League for the 2002 season after the demise of the women's tackle competition. The first competition was won by Wahine Toa. In 2004 the first representative side was selected to do a promotional tour to South Australia. By 2005 all Perth clubs were fielding a women's League Tag team. The first League Tag competitions in NSW started in the late 2000s. One of the earliest competitions, in the Group 9 area, commenced in 2008.

=== Competitions and Development ===
League Tag (Australia) competitions for ladies are held throughout winter across all Country Rugby League Groups in New South Wales at senior level, whilst most areas also have junior competitions for girls start from as young as under 8s. Other leagues, including mixed leagues also exist in spring and summer months. There are now over 9000 female players registered in country New South Wales League Tag competitions.

=== Rules ===
The rules of League Tag (Australia) are largely the same of standard rugby league, including field goals, goal kicking and kicking in general play. The most significant changes are a reduction of players per side from 13 to 11 and elimination of scrums, whilst additional rules such as prohibitions on grabbing clothing, fending of tags and performing 360-degree turns are added. Games are played over two 25-minute periods.

== League Tag (Ireland) ==
League Tag (Ireland) uses tagging the ball to affect a tackle. This method for effecting a tackle, rather than simply any ‘touch’ or the removal of a tag from the hips of an opponent was chosen because upper body tackling and stopping the ball in the tackle is such a feature of modern rugby league.

Unlike touch football and tag rugby, league tag allows ball carriers to try to prevent the ball from being tagged by holding-off a defender or knocking a defenders arm away. However, ‘hand-offs’ or ‘fends’ to the face, by the ball carrier are not allowed.

Defenders can hold on to a ball carrier whilst trying to tag the ball, but they are not allowed to attempt to tackle the ball carrier to the ground.

These rules allow league tag to be played on grass or all-weather pitches such as astro-turf, etc.

=== Origin ===
League tag was developed by the rugby league club of University College Cork in Ireland as the club were given limited facilities and many of the recruited players were novices to any code of rugby and contact sport in general, a game that could be played on astroturf as well as grass with an emphasis on participation was required, league tag evolved from this.

=== Competitions and Development ===
League tag (Ireland) is a fledgling discipline of tag rugby league having been only formally coded in January 2008, it had its first officially organised competition in University College Cork in March 2008, during the competition the rules were revised to suit more enjoyable game playing experience. League tag now has a regulatory on-line body, the LTRA which provides advice on coaching, refereeing and playing the game.

=== Rules ===
The rules of gameplay are as follows:

The objective of the game is that two teams of seven players, attempt to score more tries than each other whilst adhering to the rules and accepting the authority of the referee.

A game shall last forty minutes, 20 minutes each way. The game clock can be stopped for injuries or excessive time wasting, at the discretion of the referee, who will normally be the sole time keeper.

A coin toss will determine which team gets to choose who will start the game with possession. The loser of the toss chooses which direction the teams will play.

The field of play will be a maximum 50 metres long and up to 50 metres wide, with an in-goal area of up to 5 metres. This enables half a standard size rugby pitch to be used.

A match starts with a zero tackle play-the-ball in the centre of the pitch. The defending team is allowed a single marker, who must stand square, i.e. directly in front of the attacking player who is going the play-the-ball.

All other defenders must be back at least in line with the referee, who will be 7 metres from the attacking player who is to play-the-ball.

The attacking team will retain possession for 5 ‘tags’ (rather than the standard Rugby League set of 6) providing they do not make any errors or commit any infringements during their time in possession.

When 5 tags have been made the referee will call a ‘handover’ and the game will restart with a zero tackle play-the-ball by the team that has defended for the 5 tags, on the mark of the last tag.

The referee determines if a ‘tag’ has been made. A tag is successful when the referee is satisfied that the defender has put a hand or finger on the ball.

All instances of mishandling, whether the ball is knocked forward or back, result in a ‘handover’. Advantage is not normally played, instead the game restarts with a zero play-the-ball.

If a defending player touches the ball in flight and it goes to ground, this will count as mishandling on his part and the original attacking team will be awarded a zero tackle play-the-ball.

The only exception to this is that any touch by the hand of a defender to a ball that has been kicked, immediately makes the ball his. If he catches it cleanly he can play on, but even if he knocks it forward or behind, his team will be awarded possession.(a handover, and a zero tackle play-the-ball at the place he touches it).

If, however he attempts to play on, runs more than 5 metres and then mishandles, or passes to a player who then mishandles, the team that kicked the ball will be given back possession with a zero tackle.

Kicks can only be on the last tackle, and the ball can only be kicked once. It cannot be hacked on or dribbled, nor can it be kicked for a second time after being regathered.

If a kick hits a defender (not on the hand) and goes out of play the referee will award a handover to the non kicking team.

Any handover within 10 metres of either try-line, will result in a zero tackle play-the-ball 10 metres from the line.

=== X-League ===
This version of League Tag was a forerunner to X-League – information (https://web.archive.org/web/20201123191138/https://www.rugby-league.com/get_involved/play/x-league ) (Wayback Machine archived at 23 November 2020)

== See also ==
- Rugby league
- Tag rugby
- Touch football (rugby league)
- Flag football – the equivalent spinoff from American football.
