= Jason Stanton =

Australian rugby coach (born 1975)

Personal information
- Full name: Jason Stanley Michael Stanton
- Born: 11 October 1975 (age 51) Australia
- Height: 175 cm (5 ft 9 in)
- Weight: 92 kg (14 st 7 lb)

Playing information
- Position: Five-eighth, Halfback
Representative
Years	Team	Pld	T	G	FG	P
2000	Lebanon Rugby League World Cup	2	0	0	0	0
2006	Lebanon Rugby League Sevens	6	4	2	0	20

Jason Stanton is a rugby league/union coach who coached the Australian women's rugby sevens team to victory in the inaugural women's tournament of the 2009 Rugby World Cup Sevens. He established the Cronulla Sharks Skills Academy and their first Women's NRL team Stanton was the Assistant Coach of the NZ KiwiFerns for the 2017 Women's Rugby League World Cup. He previously has served as a skills coach to the Queensland Reds in 2009 and to the South African Men's Springboks 7's from 2008 to 2011. He also was a consultant coach for the Stormers Rugby Union (Super XV Rugby). As a player, Stanton represented Lebanon in the 2000 Rugby League World Cup as well as in the national sevens team in 2006.

== Early years ==
Stanton attended St Patrick's College, Strathfield graduating in 1993. He represented the college in First XI Cricket and First XV Rugby. In 1993 he was selected as Fly half in the NSW ISA First XV Rugby team. Stanton played junior representative Rugby League for Canterbury (u/17s), Balmain (u19s) and Easts (u/19s, u/21s, Reserve Grade).

== Playing career ==
Stanton played rugby league for Lebanon at the 2000 World Cup. Stanton played for Lebanon rugby league sevens in 2006. Lebanon won the Orara Valley 7's beating Fiji in the final. Stanton was awarded runner up player of the tournament.

== Coaching career ==
In 2009, Stanton coached the Australian women's rugby sevens team to victory in the 2009 Rugby World Cup Sevens' inaugural women's tournament.

He served as a skills coach to the Queensland Reds in 2009.

Stanton served as a consultant coach to the South African rugby sevens team from 2008 to 2011 touring with the team in 2010 & 2011.

Stanton established the Cronulla Sharks NRL Women's program and was Head Coach of the Women's team (NRL). He is also a consultant for Stormers rugby union side (Super XV Rugby).

Stanton recently served as Assistant Coach for the NZ Kiwi Ferns in the 2017 Women's Rugby League World Cup.
