= National Touch League =

National Touch League (NTL)
- League logo
- Sport: Touch Football
- Founded: 1997
- Administrator: Touch Football Australia
- Venue(s): Coffs Harbour International Stadium
- Official website: National Touch League

The National Touch League is a national-wide domestic competition for the sport of Touch Football in Australia. The annual four-day competition allows thirteen regional permits and touch football affiliates from across Australia to compete in twelve divisions including Open, Mixed and Senior categories. The competition is split into a Seniors competition (over-age divisions from over 30s to over 50s) and an open competition (not restricted by age, other than for the under 20s divisions).

Prior to the formation of the NRL Touch Premiership in May 2018, the competition was the pinnacle of Australian domestic touch football, and the primary selection event for national representative teams.

== Divisions ==
The 12 divisions contested at the National Touch League from 1997 to 2007 were

- Opens: Men, Women, Mixed
- Under 20 years: Men, Women
- Over 30 years: Men, Women
- Over 35 years: Men, Women
- Over 40 years: Men, Women
- Over 45 years: Men, Women
- Over 50 years: Men

In 2008 until 2011, under the revised format, these divisions were altered to

- Opens: Men, Women, Mixed
- Under 20 years (from 2010): Men, Women
- Over 27 years: Women
- Over 30 years: Men
- Senior Mixed (Women over 30, Men over 35)
- Senior Women (over 35s and over 40s teams)
- Over 40 years: Men
- Over 45 years: Men
- Over 50 years: Men

From 2012 until 2018, the NTL consisted of the following divisions:

- Elite 8: Men, Women
- Open: Mixed
- T-League: Men, Women
- Over 27 years: Women
- Over 30 years: Men
- Senior Mixed (Women over 30, Men over 35)
- Over 35 years: Women
- Over 40 years: Men, Women
- Over 45 years: Men, Women
- Over 50 years: Men
- Over 55 years: Men
- Over 60 years: Men

== History ==
The National Touch League was created to replace the 'Australian Nationals' which featured the seven Australian states. The finals of this competition were traditionally played between Queensland and New South Wales, the two most dominant touch playing states, with the Australian Capital Territory also performing strongly. The National Touch League increased representative opportunities for players from these states, while providing a more level playing field for competitors from the non-rugby league playing states. The first National Touch League was played in 1997.

While the format of the competition has had some minor amendments during the past 10 years of competition the stability of the event has led to the development of fierce rivalries between regions. The traditionally strong Touch Football regions have maintained their dominance of the competition.

At the time of its introduction the NTL was seen as being a move away from the past and step forward in the future development of Touch in Australia. Each of the 12 permit holders was to represent an equal number of registered players, making for a fairer, more competitive tournament. The playing talent is spread far more evenly, and it was to give a larger number of players an opportunity to impress for higher representative honours. The NTL was also to provide the players with an important intermediate competition between local and state or national teams.

The NTL was also seen as being a marketing tool that would have significant value as a promotional vehicle. The first NTL opened up merchandising and sponsorship opportunities and was televised on regional television networks and the Optus Vision cable network.

The NTL was also expected to deliver a strong national club structure which would engender regional identity and lead to further grass roots development within the sport.

=== Format and Focus ===
The competition was initially established to provide wide exposure to the elite competition in open divisions. As the competition evolved between 1997 and 2007 its popularity, especially with senior players, has led to the original focus being broadened to include participation.

The 1997 National Touch League was held from on 17–19 October. The divisions contested were Open Men, Women and Mixed and under-20 Men and Women. Most of the 12 permit holders fielded Men's, Women's and Mixed teams. The tournament finals were broadcast on WIN Television, NBN Television and Optus vision while NBN as the host broadcaster also ran 50 television commercials to promote the 1997 event.

The 1998 NTL ran from in October. The competition was run as two separate competitions, the Open divisions and the Seniors divisions. This format would persist until 2008.

The 2008 NTL saw a significant restructuring with the Open and Senior competition being run concurrently. The Seniors competition was run from the 12th to 14 March 2008, and for the first time in the events history, the Opens competition overlapped the Seniors competition, starting on the 13th and running until 15 March. The under-20s divisions were removed from the Open competition and were held in conjunction with the National 18s competition, to become the Touch Football National Youth Championships held from the 17th to 20 September. They later returned to the NTL.

2010 became the biggest NTL in history, when it was opened up to incumbent NTL permits and regions / minor states in their own rights.

In 2012, an Elite 8 division was created for elite touch football players. The division featured eight men's and eight women's teams. The Elite 8 division lasted until 2018, when it was incorporated into the newly launched NRL Touch Premiership.

=== Results for the Open Divisions ===
Up to and including 2010.

Open NTL Titles
Team	Titles
Barbarians	0
Brisbane City Cobras	9
Crusaders	0
Gold Coast Sharks	9
Hunter Western Hornets	0
Northern Eagles	0
NQ Cyclones	0
Qld Country Rustlers	0
Southern Suns	0
Suncoast Surfing Pineapples	0
Sydney Mets	12
Sydney Rebels	1
Sydney Scorpions	8
Further information: List of total NTL championships

1997
	Men's: Sydney Scorpions 4 def Brisbane City Cobras 3
	Women's: Brisbane City Cobras 2 def Sydney Mets 1
	Mixed: Sydney Rebels 7 def Brisbane City Cobras 5
1998
	Men's: Sydney Scorpions 4 def Sun West Razorbacks 3
	Women's: Sydney Mets 3 def Gold Coast Sharks 1
	Mixed: Sydney Scorpions 6 def Gold Coast Sharks 5
1999
	Men's: Sydney Scorpions 3 def Brisbane City Cobras 2
	Women's: Brisbane City Cobras 4 def Gold Coast Sharks 3
	Mixed: Sydney Scorpions 5 def Sydney Rebels 4
2000
	Men's: Sydney Scorpions 69 def Brisbane City Cobras 4
	Women's: Brisbane City Cobras 6 def Sydney Mets 5
	Mixed: Brisbane City Cobras 4 def Sydney Rebels 3
2001
	Men's: Brisbane City Cobras 6 def Sydney Mets 2
	Women's: Sydney Mets 3 def Brisbane City Cobras 2
	Mixed: Gold Coast Sharks 2 def Brisbane City Cobras 1
2002
	Men's: Sydney Mets 5 def Brisbane City Cobras 4
	Women's: Brisbane City Cobras 12 def Hunter Western Hornets 2
	Mixed: Sydney Scorpions 7 def Sydney Mets 5
2003
	Men's: Gold Coast Sharks 5 def Sydney Mets 4
	Women's: Brisbane City Cobras 6 def Sydney Mets 5
	Mixed: Sydney Scorpions 7 def Gold Coast Sharks 5
2004
	Men's: Sydney Mets 5 def Brisbane City Cobras 4
	Women's: Gold Coast Sharks 2 def Brisbane City Cobras 1
	Mixed: Sydney Mets 8 def Gold Coast Sharks 3
2005
	Men's: Gold Coast Sharks 6 def Sydney Scorpions 5
	Women's: Sydney Mets 6 def Brisbane City Cobras 4
	Mixed: Sydney Mets 6 def Gold Coast Sharks 5
2006
	Men's: Gold Coast Sharks 5 def Sydney Mets 4
	Women's: Gold Coast Sharks 4 def Sydney Mets 3
	Mixed: Sydney Mets 6 def Sydney Scorpions 2
2007
	Men's: Gold Coast Sharks 7 def Sydney Mets 6
	Women's: Brisbane City Cobras 6 def Sydney Mets 5
	Mixed: Gold Coast Sharks 12 def Hunter Western Hornets 8
2008
	Men's: Sydney Mets 5 def Gold Coast Sharks 2
	Women's: Sydney Mets 6 def Barbarians 1
	Mixed: Brisbane City Cobras 7 def Southern Suns 6
2009
	Men's: Gold Coast Sharks 10 def Sydney Scorpions 8
	Women's: Sydney Mets 5 def Gold Coast Sharks 4
	Mixed: Sydney Mets 10 def Gold Coast Sharks 5
2010
	Men's: Sydney Scorpions 7 def Gold Coast Sharks 3
	Women's: Sydney Mets 7 def Brisbane City Cobras 6
	Mixed: Sydney Mets 8 def Sydney Rebels 7
2011
	Mixed: Sydney Rebels 5 def Brisbane City Cobras 3

== Awards ==
Following each NTL a Player of the Series and a Player of the Final are recognised for each division. This award is chosen by the Australian Selectors and Coaches for each division.
