= Federation of International Touch =

Governing body for Touch football

- Abbreviation: FIT
- Formation: 1985
- Founded at: Melbourne, Australia
- Type: International Sport Federation / World Governing Body
- Members: 60
- Chief Operating Officer: Chris Simon
- Chair: Peter Topp
- Finance Director: Aaron Jones
- Director: Ian Syder
- Website: internationaltouch.org

The Federation of International Touch (FIT) is the worldwide governing body for Touch football. The Federation of International Touch was formed at a meeting held in conjunction with the Australian National championships, and first ever international representative fixtures between Australia and New Zealand, in Melbourne, 1985.

== Events ==
Several international representative events are organised or sanctioned by FIT, including:

- Touch Football World Cup
- Youth Touch World Cup
- European Touch Championships ("the Euro's")
- European Junior Touch Championships ("the Youth Euro's")
- Asian Touch Cup
- Trans Tasman Test Series (between Australia and New Zealand), including Open, Youth, Senior divisions
- Pacific Games
- World Masters Games

=== European Championship ===
European Touch Championships:

2023 Vichy, France

2022 Nottingham, England

2018 Nottingham, England

2016 Jersey, Channel Islands

2014 Swansea, Wales

2012 Treviso, Italy

2010 Bristol, England

2008 Massey, France

2006 Edinburgh, Scotland

2004 Jersey, Channel Islands

2002 Cardiff, Wales

2000 Edinburgh, Scotland

1998 Nottingham, England

1996 Halifax, England

== Members ==
As of March 2022, FIT recognised the national governing bodies of 49 nations as members of the Federation:

- Asia (13):
  - China (China Touch Association)
  - Chinese Taipei (Chinese Taipei Touch Association)
  - Hong Kong (Hong Kong Touch Association)
  - India (Touch Rugby Federation of India)
  - Japan (Touch Rugby Japan)
  - Lebanon (Lebanon Touch Association)
  - Malaysia (FIT Touch Malaysia)
  - United Arab Emirates (Middle East Touch)
  - Philippines (Touch Association Pilipinas)
  - Qatar (Qatar Touch Rugby)
  - Singapore (Touch Singapore)
  - Sri Lanka (Sri Lanka Touch Association)
  - Thailand (Thai Touch Football Association)
- Oceania (12):
  - Australia (Touch Football Australia)
  - Cook Islands (Cook Islands Touch Association)
  - Fiji (Touch Federation Fiji)
  - Kiribati (Kiribati National Touch Association)
  - New Zealand (Touch NZ)
  - Niue (Niue Touch Association)
  - Papua New Guinea (Touch Football Papua New Guinea)
  - Samoa (Samoa Touch Rugby)
  - Solomon Islands
  - Tokelau
  - Tonga (Tonga National Touch Association)
  - Tuvalu (Tuvalu Touch Association)
- Africa (1):
  - South Africa (South African Touch Association)
- North America (2):
  - Canada (Touch Canada)
  - United States (USA Touch)
- South America (1):
  - Chile (Touch Rugby Chile)
- Europe (20):
  - Austria (Touch Austria)
  - Belgium (Touch Belgium)
  - Bulgaria (Bulgaria Touch)
  - Czech Republic (Czech Republic Touch)
  - England (England Touch Association)
  - Estonia
  - France (Touch France)
  - Germany (Touch Deutschland)
  - Guernsey (Guernsey Touch)
  - Ireland (Ireland Touch Association)
  - Italy (Italia Touch)
  - Jersey (Jersey Touch)
  - Luxembourg (Luxembourg National Touch Association)
  - Netherlands (Touch Nederland)
  - Portugal (Touch Rugby Portugal)
  - Scotland (Scottish Touch Association)
  - Spain (Touch España)
  - Sweden (Sweden Touch)
  - Switzerland (Touch Switzerland)
  - Wales (Wales Touch Association)

== International Partners ==
- Recognised by Organisation of Sports Federations of Oceania (OSFO)

== See also ==
- International Federation of American Football
- Australian rules football
- International Canoe Federation
- International Va'a Federation
