= Touch Football Australia =

National governing body of touch football

- Sport: Touch Football
- Jurisdiction: National
- Membership: 8 States/Territories
- Abbreviation: TFA
- Founded: 2005
- Affiliation: FIT
- Headquarters: Rugby League Central
- Location: Moore Park, Sydney
- Chairperson: Christian Frost
- CEO: Marcus Ashcroft
- Men's coach: Phil Gyemmore
- Women's coach: Vacant
- Sponsor: DoorDash
- Replaced: Australian Touch Association
- (founded): 1978 as Australian Touch Football Association, renamed to Australian Touch Association in 1981

Official website
- touchfootball.com.au
- (Australia)

Touch Football Australia is the governing body of touch football in Australia. It is a member of the Federation of International Touch, the sport's international governing body.

== History ==
=== Origins ===
The Australian Touch Association (ATA) was founded in 1978, following the formation of several state-level organisations, as the national governing body of the sport. The ATA was responsible for the coordination of the sport at a national level, which included the creation of a national championships and the release of the first official rule book, in 1980.

In 2004, following a review into the sport by David Shilbury and Pamm Kellett, the ATA adopted a new national structure, absorbing the operations of all member states and territories (with the exception of the Queensland and New South Wales association) and began trading as Touch Football Australia.

There are now over 600,000 registered members and 500,000 children who participate in Touch Football and according to Australian Sports Commission statistics, it is among the top participation based, organised sports in Australia.

=== NRL Touch Football ===
NRL Touch Football logo

On August 13, 2013, Touch Football Australia and the National Rugby League announced a joint-venture partnership between the two organisations to work together and form the largest sporting community in Australia. The partnership resulted in a major boost to funding and promotion of touch football across the country, with an aim to boost participation rates of both sports. As part of the partnership, the "NRL Touch Football" brand was created to align the marketing of the sport to the NRL brand profile.

== National Teams ==
Australia's national touch football teams are known as the Emus.

- Men's Open
- Women's Open
- Mixed Open
- Women's Over 27 Years
- Senior Mixed
- Men's Over 30 Years
- Men's Over 35 Years
- Men's Over 40 Years
- Men's Over 50 Years
- Australian Referees

== Domestic Competitions ==
=== National Touch League ===
Founded in 1997, the National Touch League was the only domestic competition for touch football in Australia, until the formation of the sport's first national home and away competition, the NRL Touch Premiership, in 2018.

=== NRL Touch Premiership ===
In May 2018, in partnership with the National Rugby League, Touch Football Australia launched the NRL Touch Premiership. The competition features six touch football teams aligned to NRL teams.

The inaugural teams include:

- QLD Cowboys (North Queensland Cowboys)
- QLD Titans (Gold Coast Titans)
- QLD Broncos (Brisbane Broncos)
- Newcastle Knights (Newcastle Knights)
- Parramatta Eels (Parramatta Eels)
- Wests Tigers (Wests Tigers)

The competition is divided into two conferences - Queensland (Cowboys, Broncos, Titans) and New South Wales (Knights, Eels, Tigers) - during the regular season, and culminates in the first placed teams from each conference competing in the grand final.

All matches are played prior to NRL matches with coverage being provided by broadcast partners Fox Sports Australia.

Due to the COVID-19 pandemic, the 2020 season had to be postponed, and the NRL Touch Premiership hasn't been played since the 2019 season.

=== Indigenous Australian vs Māori All-Stars ===
Elite Indigenous and Maori Touch Football teams have regularly taken part in the NRL Indigenous Australian vs Maori All-Stars event, playing the curtain-raiser to the men's and women's NRL games.

== International Competitions ==
Australia participates in the Touch Football World Cup at an international level. Since the inaugural World Cup in 1988 they have won 332 games out of the 362 they have played.

The 2015 World Cup was held at the Coffs Harbour International Stadium in Coffs Harbour. Australia won eight of the nine categories they competed in.

Australia's national touch football teams compete against New Zealand in Trans-Tasman Test Series.

== Membership ==
There are eight member associations in each state:

- Touch Football Australian Capital Territory
- Touch Football New South Wales
- Touch Football Northern Territory
- Touch Football Queensland
- Touch Football South Australia
- Touch Football Tasmania
- Touch Football Victoria
- Touch Football Western Australia

== Hall of Fame ==
Australian touch football Hall of Famers:

- Terry Jacks
- Karen Smith
- Lisa Neal
- Ray Lawrence
- Ron Wall
- Kerry Norman
- Mark Boland
- Scott Notley
- Craig Pierce
- Katrina Toohey (née Maher)
- Bob Brindell
- Peter McNeven
- Rick Borg
- Mick McCall
- Peter Bell
- Garry Lawless
- Stacey Black (née Gregory)
- Stephen Pike
- Dean Russell
- David Cheung
- Tim Kitchingham
- Renee Murphy
- Sharyn Williams
- Darren Shelley
- Gai Taylor
- Owen Lane
- Adam Foley
- Giselle Tirado
- Greg Young
- Tony Trad
- Bo de la Cruz
- Drumayne Dayberg-Muir
- Amanda Judd
- Kristy Judd
- Gavin Shuker
- Garry Sonda
- Louise Winchester
