= Touch World Cup =

Sports tournament

- Most recent season or competition: 2019
- Sport: Touch
- Founded: 1988
- First season: 1988
- No. of teams: 28
- Countries: Australia, Belgium, Chile, China, Chinese Taipei, Cook Islands, England, Europe, France, Fiji, Germany, Hong Kong, Ireland, Italy, Japan, Malaysia, Netherlands, New Zealand, Niue, Papua New Guinea, Philippines, Samoa, Scotland, Singapore, South Africa, United Arab Emirates, United States, Wales
- Most recent champion: Australia (2024)
- Tournament format: Round Robin and a Finals Series
- Website: www.internationaltouch.org

The first Touch World Cup tournament was held in 1988. Touch and the Touch World Cup are monitored by the international governing body for touch the Federation of International Touch (FIT). The Touch World Cup has been hosted in five continents (Asia, Oceania, Europe, North America, Africa) but is yet to be played in South America. Australia has hosted the World Cup the most having hosted it thrice. While the number of participant teams is growing steadily, almost all finals to date have been contested between Australia and New Zealand. Australia has won the most finals.

In accordance with the rules of Touch, all World Cup matches are played on a rectangular 70m x 50m pitch. It is played six aside with eight substitutes. The match is played for 40 minutes in two twenty-minute halves. Touch, unlike many other football variants, always uses three referees. This is the same in the Touch World Cup.

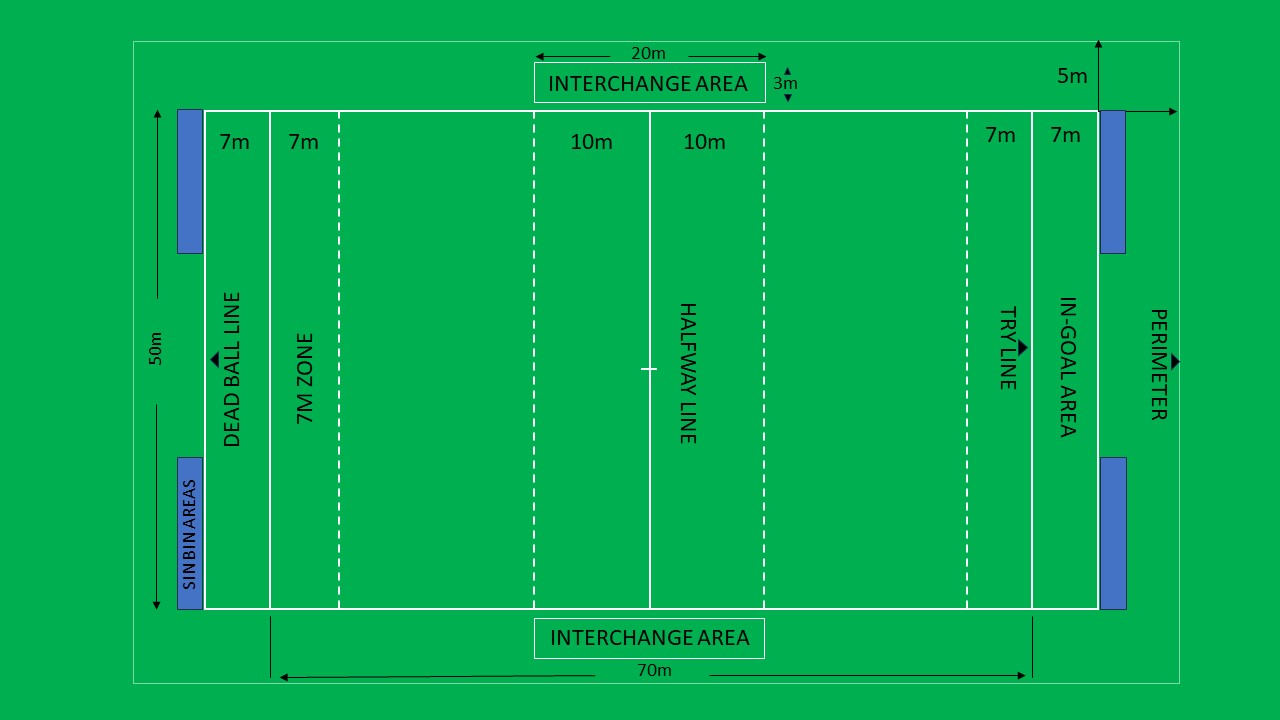
FIT Field Standards 5th Edition Rulebook

Touch and therefore the Touch World Cup are seen as competitors to its Rugby Union equivalent, Tag rugby and the Tag rugby world cup, which is held every three years, the Touch World Cup is instead held every four years much like the football and rugby (league and union) world cups.

== World Cup Venues ==
The following outlines the World Cups held and planned for the future.

1. 1988 - Australia (Gold Coast) in 4 Divisions.
2. 1991 - New Zealand (Auckland) in 6 Divisions.
3. 1995 - United States (Hawaii) in 7 Divisions.
4. 1999 - Australia (Sydney) in 8 Divisions.
5. 2003 - Japan (Kumagaya) in 5 Divisions.
6. 2007 - South Africa (Stellenbosch) in 6 Divisions.
7. 2011 - Scotland (Edinburgh) in 7 Divisions.
8. 2015 - Australia (Coffs Harbour) in 9 Divisions.
9. 2019 - Malaysia (Putrajaya) in 11 Divisions.
10. 2024 - England (Nottingham) in 13 Divisions.

== World Cup Results ==
=== 1988 - Australia (Gold Coast) ===
World Cup # : 1
Dates : 14–16 November 1988
Participants : 5 (Australia, Canada, New Zealand, Papua New Guinea, USA)
Location : Carrara Oval, Gold Coast, Queensland, Australia
Overall winner : Australia

Division	Winners	Runners-up	Teams
Men's Open	Australia	New Zealand	4
Women's Open	Australia	New Zealand	4
Mixed Open	Australia	New Zealand	4
Men's Masters (Over 35 years)	Australia	New Zealand	5

=== 1991 - New Zealand (Auckland) ===
World Cup # : 2
Dates : 3–7 December 1991
Participants : 9 (Australia, Cook Islands, Fiji, Japan, New Zealand, Niue, Papua New Guinea, Samoa, Tokelau)
Location : Avondale Racecourse, Auckland, New Zealand
Overall winner : Australia

Division	Winners	Runners-up	Teams
Men's Open	Australia	New Zealand	9
Women's Open	Australia	New Zealand	6
Mixed Open	Australia	New Zealand	6
Men's Seniors (over 30 years)	Australia	New Zealand	7
Women's Seniors (over 27 years)	New Zealand	Australia	5
Men's Masters (over 35 years)	Australia	New Zealand	6

=== 1995 - USA, Hawaii (Waikiki Beach) ===
World Cup # : 3
Dates : 21–25 March 1995
Participants : 11 (American Samoa, Australia, Cook Islands, Japan, New Zealand, Niue, Papua New Guinea, Samoa, South Africa, Tonga, United States)
Location : Kapiolani Park, Waikiki Beach, Hawaii, United States
Overall winner : Australia

Division	Winners	Runners-up	Teams
Men's Open	Australia	New Zealand	8
Women's Open	Australia	New Zealand	6
Mixed Open	Australia	New Zealand	8
Men's Over 30 Years	Australia	New Zealand	7
Women's Over 30 Years	Australia	New Zealand	5
Men's Over 35 Years	Australia	New Zealand	5
Men's Over 40 Years	Australia	New Zealand	3

=== 1999 - Australia (Sydney) ===
World Cup # : 4
Dates : 21–24 April 1999
Participants : 19 (Australia, Cook Islands, England, Fiji, Italy, Japan, Lebanon, New Zealand, Niue, Papua New Guinea, Samoa, Scotland, Singapore, Solomon Islands, South Africa, Tokelau, Tonga, USA, Wales)
Location : David Phillips Sports Fields, Daceyville, Sydney, Australia
Overall winner : Australia

Division	Winners	Runners-up	Teams
Men's Open	Australia	New Zealand	13
Women's Open	Australia	New Zealand	8
Mixed Open	New Zealand	Australia	15
Men's Over 30 Years	Australia	Lebanon	12
Women's Over 30 Years	Australia	New Zealand	5
Mixed Over 30 Years	New Zealand	Australia	5
Men's Over 35 Years	Australia	New Zealand	4
Men's Over 40 Years	Australia	New Zealand	5

=== 2003 - Japan (Kumagaya) ===
World Cup # : 5
Dates : 24–28 May 2003
Participants : 10 (Australia, Japan, New Zealand, Niue, Scotland, Singapore, South Africa, Thailand, USA, Wales)
Location : Kumagaya Rugby Complex, Kumagaya, Japan
Overall winner : Australia

Division	Winners	Runners-up	Teams
Men's Open	Australia	New Zealand	6
Women's Open	Australia	New Zealand	5
Mixed Open	Australia	New Zealand	7
Men's Over 30 Years	Australia	New Zealand	5
Men's Over 35 Years	Australia	New Zealand	4

=== 2007 - South Africa (Stellenbosch) ===
World Cup # : 6
Dates : 17–21 January 2007
Participants : 15 (Australia, England, Fiji, France, Japan, Jersey, Lebanon, New Zealand, Samoa, Scotland, Singapore, South Africa, Switzerland, USA, Wales)
Location : Danie Craven Stadium, Stellenbosch, South Africa
Overall winner : Australia

Division	Winners	Runners-up	Teams
Men's Open	Australia	New Zealand	8
Women's Open	Australia	New Zealand	8
Mixed Open	New Zealand	Australia	6
Mixed 30s	New Zealand	Australia	7
Men's Over 30 Years	Australia	Samoa	8
Men's Over 35 Years	Australia	South Africa	4

=== 2011 - Scotland (Edinburgh) ===
World Cup # : 7
Dates : 22–26 June 2011
Participants : 26 (Australia, Austria, Belgium, Catalonia, Cook Islands, England, Fiji, France, Germany, Guernsey, Hungary, Ireland, Italy, Japan, Jersey, Luxembourg, Netherlands, New Zealand, Niue, Scotland, Singapore, South Africa, Spain, Switzerland, United States and Wales)
Location : Peffermill Sports Centre, Edinburgh, Scotland
Overall winner : Australia

Division	Winners	Runners-up	Teams
Men's Open	Australia	New Zealand	15
Women's Open	Australia	New Zealand	11
Mixed Open	Australia	New Zealand	19
Senior Mixed	New Zealand	Australia	7
Men's Over 30 Years	Australia	England	10
Men's Over 35 Years	Australia	South Africa	11
Men's Over 40 Years	New Zealand	Australia	10

=== 2015 - Australia (Coffs Harbour) ===
World Cup # : 8
Dates : 29 April - 3 May 2015
Participants : 25 (Australia, Chile, China, Cook Islands, England, France, Fiji, Germany, Hong Kong, Ireland, Italy, Japan, Malaysia, Middle East Touch, Netherlands, New Zealand, Niue, Papua New Guinea, Philippines, Samoa, Scotland, Singapore, South Africa, United States, Wales)
Teams: 90
Location : Coffs Harbour International Stadium, Coffs Harbour, Australia
Overall winner : Australia

Division	Winners	Runners-up	Teams
Men's Open	Australia	New Zealand	16
Women's Open	Australia	New Zealand	14
Mixed Open	Australia	New Zealand	22
Women's Over 27 Years	Australia	New Zealand	5
Senior Mixed	Australia	New Zealand	6
Men's Over 30 Years	Australia	Cook Islands	7
Men's Over 35 Years	New Zealand	Australia	6
Men's Over 40 Years	Australia	New Zealand	9
Men's Over 50 Years	Australia	Italy	5

=== 2019 - Malaysia (Putrajaya) ===
World Cup # : 9
Dates : 29 April - 4 May 2019
Participants : 28 (Australia, Belgium, Chile, China, Chinese Taipei, Cook Islands, England, Europe, France, Fiji, Germany, Great Britain, Hong Kong, Ireland, Italy, Japan, Malaysia, Netherlands, New Zealand, Niue, Papua New Guinea, Philippines, Samoa, Scotland, Singapore, South Africa, United Arab Emirates, United States, Wales)
Location : Taman Ekuestrian, Putrajaya, Malaysia
Overall winner : Australia

Overall Runners up : New Zealand

Overall Winners, Australia

Overall Runners Up, New Zealand

Division	Winners	Runners-up	3rd Place	Teams
Men's Open	Australia	New Zealand	Japan	16
Women's Open	Australia	New Zealand	Japan	17
Mixed Open	Australia	New Zealand	Scotland	22
Women's Over 27 Years	New Zealand	Australia	England	7
Senior Mixed (over 30 years)	Australia	Cook Islands	New Zealand	11
Men's Over 30 Years	Australia	South Africa	France	8
Men's Over 35 Years	Australia	New Zealand	Cook Islands	6
Women's Over 35 Years	Australia	New Zealand	England	4
Men's Over 40 Years	New Zealand	Australia	Japan	13
Men's Over 45 Years	Australia	New Zealand	South Africa	6
Men's Over 50 Years	New Zealand	Australia	Singapore	6

During the 2019 Touch World Cup, all divisions consisted of a round robin of 1 or more groups, and a finals series. Some groups also consisted of a playoff series.

=== 2024 - England (Nottingham) ===
World Cup # : 10
Dates : 15 - 21 July 2024
Participants : 35 (Australia, Belgium, Canada, Cayman Islands, Chile, China, Chinese Taipei, Cook Islands, England, Fiji, France, Germany, Guernsey, Hong Kong China, Ireland, Italy, Japan, Jersey, Lebanon, Luxembourg, Malaysia, Middle East Touch, Netherlands, New Zealand, Oman, Papua New Guinea, Philippines, Portugal, Samoa, Scotland, Singapore, South Africa, Spain, Sweden, Switzerland, Thailand, Tonga, United States, Wales)
Location : University of Nottingham
Overall winner : Australia

Overall Runners up : New Zealand

Overall Winners, Australia

Overall Runners Up, New Zealand

Division	Winners	Runners-up	3rd Place	Teams
Men's Open	Australia	New Zealand	Lebanon	18
Women's Open	Australia	New Zealand	England	21
Mixed Open	Australia	New Zealand	England	29
Women's Over 27 Years	Australia	England	South Africa	10
Men's Over 30 Years	Australia	New Zealand	England	19
Mixed Over 30 Years	Australia	New Zealand	England	17
Men's Over 35 Years	Australia	New Zealand	South Africa	8
Women's Over 35 Years	Australia	England	South Africa	8
Men's Over 40 Years	New Zealand	Australia	England	17
Women's Over 40 Years	Australia	New Zealand	England	5
Men's Over 45 Years	Australia	New Zealand	France	14
Men's Over 50 Years	Australia	New Zealand	England	15
Men's Over 55 Years	Australia	New Zealand	England	5

Full results are available on the FIT website.
