= Touch (sport) =

Sport derived from rugby league

Touch (also known as touch football or touch rugby league) is a variant of rugby league that is conducted under the direction of the Federation of International Touch (FIT). Though it shares similarities and history with rugby league, it is recognised as a sport in its own right due to its differences which have been developed over the sport's lifetime.

Touch is a variation of rugby league with the tackling of opposing players replaced by a touch. As touches must be made with minimal force, touch is therefore considered a limited-contact sport. The original basic rules of touch were established in the 1960s by members of the South Sydney Junior Rugby League Club in Sydney, Australia.

Distinctive features of touch include the ease of learning it, minimal equipment requirements, ability to play it without fear of major injury, and the regularity of males and females playing together, and as such it is often played either as an alternative to or as a soft introduction to full-blown rugby football. While it is generally played with two teams of six on-field players, some social competitions allow a different number of players per team on the field. It is played by both sexes, and in age divisions from primary school children to over-60s. The mixed version of the sport (where both male and female players are on the field at the same time) is particularly popular with social players but is also played at an International representative level.

== History ==
=== Origins ===
While it is often claimed that Touch started in Australia in 1963 as a social or "park" game and as a training technique for rugby league, at least as early as 1956, supervised "touch and pass" was already being played at several inner city schools in the North of England, where asphalt playgrounds made normal rugby league too dangerous. Although the rules were set out by the schools' sports teachers, it was not then viewed as a sport in its own right.

Touch was formalised into a sport proper by the "Founders of Touch", Bob Dyke and Ray Vawdon of the South Sydney Junior Rugby League Club. On 13 July 1968 an organisation known as the South Sydney Touch Football Club was formed and the sport of Touch Football was officially born. The first official Touch match was played in late 1968 and the first official competition, organised by Dyke & Vawdon, was held at Rowland Park Sydney in 1968.

From its formal inception in 1968, the game quickly became a fully regulated and codified sport in Australia. Originally played under lightly modified rugby league laws to remove hard physical contact, the sport has since evolved under its own specific rules now quite varied from its rugby league roots. The reduction of field size to half that of a rugby league field in particular aided the sport's rapid growth across Australian rugby league stronghold areas as it allowed greater participation in the same geographic footprint.

The sport was first played in Brisbane, Australia in 1972 and by 1973 there were representative matches between sides representing the Australian states of Queensland and New South Wales. It had spread to New Zealand by 1975 and in 1978 the first national body, the Australian Touch Football Association (ATFA), now Touch Football Australia (TFA) was formed. The sport's first national representative event, the Australian National Championships, was held on the Gold Coast, Queensland in 1980.

The ATFA dropped the word "Football" from its name in 1981, becoming the Australian Touch Association or ATA and thereby changing the sport's name to simply Touch. In the same year, the ATA published the sport's first formal set of playing rules.

The first international match was played between Australia and New Zealand in Melbourne in 1985, leading to the creation of the Federation of International Touch and the formulation of the sport's first set of global rules based on the playing rules in use by the ATA at the time.

== Rules and equipment ==
=== Rules ===
The current rules are based on the 8th Edition published by the Australian governing body, Touch Football Australia, in 2020. The updated rules were subsequently adopted by FIT as the FIT 5th Edition Playing Rules. The rules include a section of touch-specific terms and phrases, many of which are shared with rugby league (e.g. offside, intercept, try).

=== Playing field ===
Touch is played on a grass, rectangular field measuring 70 x 50 metres (i.e. slightly larger than one half of a rugby league field). As kicking is not allowed, goal posts are not required.

=== Ball ===
Touch balls are oval and slightly smaller than rugby league balls. The official size is 36 cm long and 55 cm in circumference, also sometimes known as rugby size 4.

=== Clothing ===
Players typically wear light clothing such as singlets, T-shirts or polo shirts and shorts. All shirts must be numbered. Women generally wear lycra bike shorts, athletic briefs or swimsuit-style lycra bodysuits. Head caps or visors are also commonly worn on the touch field by players and officials.

=== Footwear ===
Players normally wear soft rubber cleated shoes, similar to those used in other grass sports such as cricket and field hockey. Screw-in cleats are strictly prohibited, though moulded-sole football boots may be worn.

=== Referee ===
Touch must have at least one referee to manage a match but most major matches feature a team of three referees alternating between a controlling referee and two sideline referees throughout the match.

=== Positions ===
Teams are generally split into three positions: two "wings" (the players on either edge of the field i.e. 'right wing' and 'left wing'); two "middles" (the central players); and two "links" (the players between the wings and middles, one on each side of the field i.e. 'right link' and 'left link').

=== Half ===
The half (formerly known as the acting half or dummy half) is subject to a number of restrictions that do not apply to other players:

- If the half is touched with the ball, the attacking team loses possession.
- The half cannot score a try. Attempting to do so (even grounding the ball not purposefully) results in a change of possession.

These restrictions do not apply to a Half who passes the ball to a teammate (or indeed opposition player) and then receives it back.

At a rollball, if the Half takes too long to retrieve the ball, or is further than 1m away from the position of the rollball, defenders are allowed to move forward before the Half has touched the ball.

=== Mode of play ===
The ball can be passed or knocked (but not kicked) sideways or backwards between teammates (known as Attackers), who attempt to evade opposition players (known as Defenders) to score a Try.

=== Possession ===
A team normally retains possession for a set of six consecutive touches (as in rugby league), after which possession transfers to the opposing team. This is known as a Change of Possession, (or more informally Turnover). This can occur after six touches are completed, if the ball is dropped by the attacking team, or if the attacking team is penalised by the referee for infringing the playing rules.

=== Scoring ===
A Try (formerly Touchdown) is awarded when an attacking player, who is not the Half places the ball on or over the opposition's try line. Each Try is worth one point, though some mixed social competitions award female players two points in order to encourage ball sharing.

=== Interchanges ===
- Players may interchange an unlimited number of times throughout the match provided the team does not exceed the maximum number of on-field players allowed, which is usually six under standard FIT rules.
- The match remains continuous and does not stop to allow interchanges.
- Players coming onto the field must wait until the player they are interchanging with has left the field and entered the designated Interchange Area. Failing to do so can result in the referee awarding a penalty for an incorrect interchange.
- Players in a team who are not on the field must remain inside their allocated Interchange Area (sometimes called substitution box) until they enter the field.

=== Composition of teams ===
- Teams can consist of all male players (Men's and Boys competitions), all female players (Women's or Girls competitions), or a combination of both (Mixed competitions).
- Under standard FIT rules, each team can consist of up to 14 players, of which up to six players can be on the field at any one time.
- Mixed teams typically comprise three females and three males on the field at one time. Under standard FIT rules, there must be at least one male and one female, and no more than three males on the field at any time.

=== Match duration ===
The standard match duration is 40 minutes (two x 20-minute halves) with a 5-minute halftime, though other time frames are often used to suit local conditions and competitions.

== World Rugby ==
World Rugby, the international governing body of the rules of rugby union, published in November 2010 a draft of leisure rules of Touch Rugby IRB for developmental purposes. Those Laws were adapted from the FIT playing rules for the sport of Touch.

The document states: "Council agreed that these Leisure Rugby Laws are issued as a guide for developmental purposes and Unions are not bound to apply the Laws" and "IRB Leisure Rugby Laws have been designed so that Unions may develop non-Contact Rugby. These Laws have been produced so that there are some guidelines and principles in place for IRB Leisure Rugby. Unions having jurisdiction over their developmental processes, matches, competitions and festivals may need to vary these Laws as deemed appropriate. This allows domestic Rugby clubs to adapt to the FIT playing rules, provided domestic Touch Associations are in agreeance."

The leisure rugby laws released by World Rugby are not supported or recognised by the Federation of International Touch.

== International competitions ==
=== World Cup ===
The inaugural Touch World Cup was held on the Gold Coast, Australia in 1988. Since then, the event has been hosted in Auckland, New Zealand (1991), Waikiki Beach, Hawaii (1995), Sydney, Australia (1999), Kamagaya, Japan (2003), Stellenbosch, South Africa (2007), Edinburgh, Scotland (2011), Coffs Harbour, Australia (2015), and Putrajaya, Malaysia (2019) .

The most recent world cup was held in Nottingham, England from July 15th - 21st, 2024, and the 2028 World Cup will be held in New Zealand.

==== Youth World Cup ====
FIT conducted the first Youth Touch World Cup in Auckland, New Zealand in January 2001, followed by the second event on the Sunshine Coast, Australia in 2005. A third event was planned for 2009 however did not eventuate due to budget constraints. The Youth Touch World Cup was eventually revived in 2018 and was held in Putrajaya, Malaysia and served as a trial run for the Touch Football World Cup held in the city the following year.

The fourth Youth Touch World Cup was scheduled to be held in Manchester, England in 2021, but was rescheduled to 2023 as a result of the worldwide COVID-19 pandemic.

=== Trans-Tasman Tests ===
There is a regular program of Test matches between Australia and New Zealand known as Trans-Tasman Tests.

Tests are divided into separate events for each age category, being:

- Open (Unrestricted)
- Youth (Under 21)
- Senior or Masters (Over 30)

=== Pacific Games ===
Touch has been played at the Pacific Games since 2003. It is an optional sport for the Pacific Games program and the tournaments include men's, women's and mixed competitions.

=== European Championships ===
The Federation of International Touch (FIT) conducts the European Touch Championships, affectionately known as "The Euros", biannually.

The first Euros took place in 2010 in Bristol, UK with 19 teams contesting men's and women's open divisions. The 2012 Euros in Treviso, Italy introduced mixed touch and seniors and masters divisions.

The sixth and most recent Euros were played in Nottingham from 2-6 August 2022, with 62 teams from 17 countries contesting 10 divisions, including men's 50s for the first time.

=== Masters Games ===
Touch is popular sport at various Masters Games events.

=== World All Schools ===
The World All Schools event attracts hundreds of teams from schools around the world. It is held every 2 years. In 2006, the event was held in Singapore. Prior to that it was held in Brisbane. The 2008 event (held in Brisbane after the event was cancelled in New Zealand) was by far the largest, hosting over 250 teams.

== Touch worldwide ==
=== Australia ===
Touch is played in every Australian state and territory, and is particularly popular in the rugby league and rugby union strongholds of Queensland, New South Wales and the ACT. There are currently over 700,000 registered Touch players, 500,000 school children, and up to 100,000 casual players playing the sport. The peak governing body was formed in 1978 as the Australian Touch Football Association. In 1981 the word "football" was dropped from the name and the organisation became the Australian Touch Association. After a restructure and merger of the national body with the state-level governing bodies (except the Queensland and New South Wales associations) in 2004, the word "football" was re-incorporated into the organisations new name - Touch Football Australia.

From 1997 until 2018, Australia's main domestic competition was the National Touch League (NTL). Thirteen permits, representing all parts of Australia, compete in open-age, under-20 and over-age (Masters) divisions in men's, women's and mixed categories. The permits were originally designed to equalise competition between the traditionally strong Touch states of Queensland and NSW, and the remainder of the country. The Elite 8 series, an additional competition played at the same time as the NTL, was created in 2013 to provide a further elite domestic level to the sport. As a result, the 20 Years & Under division for that year's NTL was removed. The Elite 8 was eventually replaced in 2018 by the NRL Touch Premiership though the NTL continues.

A youth version of the National Touch League, formerly known as the National 18's and now known as the National Youth Championships, is held annually. The original National 18's event included only an 18 Years & Under division but was expanded and renamed in 2013 to accommodate the 20 Years & Under division after it was removed from the NTL as a result of the Elite 8 Series. The 20 Years & Under division reverted back to the NTL in 2014 where it has remained since. The event has simultaneously been held with the National Schools Cup, an event featuring the best school-based teams from each state. In 2020, the COVID-19 pandemic affected National Youth Championships was run simultaneously with the Queensland Junior State Championships to expand the event to include 12 Years & Under, 14 Years & Under, and 16 Years & Under, a format which was further expanded in 2021 when entry to those age divisions was opened to teams from outside of Queensland.

The first state of origin series between the stronghold states of Queensland and New South Wales was played in Port Macquarie, New South Wales in 1995 and has been played every two years since. The series originally featured a single Men's and Women's divisions, but was expanded in 1999 to include a Mixed division, and age-restricted divisions.

School Sport Australia conducts an annual National Championships, which includes division for both Primary School (Under 12) and Middle School (Under 15) sides. The location of the event rotates between states each year, and most Australian States and Territories enter Boys and Girls teams in every division.

Touch Football Australia (TFA) and the National Rugby League (NRL) signed a memorandum of understanding in August 2013, bringing the two entities together to form a partnership to develop the sport across both codes. The agreement recognised the similarities between both Touch and Rugby league and that the significant benefits to both through a dual-track pathway. The agreement resulted in the creation of a unified "NRL Touch Football" brand in Australia, which resulted in a major profile and funding boost for the sport within the country, including the signing of a commercial partnership agreement between the two entities and the principle "whole of game sponsor", initially Harvey Norman and later Doordash.

In May 2018, under the NRL Touch Football partnership, the organisation launched the NRL Touch Premiership, a domestic home and away series played as curtain raisers to NRL matches. The initial teams were drawn from the Elite 8 Series and aligned to NRL clubs.

Melbourne Touch6s

Melbourne Touch6s is an annual touch football tournament held in Melbourne, Victoria, Australia. Established in 2023 and organized by the Sri Lankan Touch Footy Club Melbourne, the event follows official Touch Football Australia (TFA) rules. It features a 6-player per team format across several categories, including Open, Over 40s, Women's, and Juniors. Melbourne Touch6s is held at Comely Bank Recreation Reserve.

=== Austria ===
The Touch Austria Association became an associate member of F.I.T (Federation International Touch) in October 2009 with 3 official member clubs (Touch Rugby Vienna, ACC Touch, Touch Voralberg). 2009 saw the establishment of the Austrian Touch League (ATL) plus the first ever national Touch teams (Mixed and Men's) that competed in the 2009 Mainland Cup. Touch Austria also sends teams to contest regular events in other tournaments in Europe.

=== Chile ===
Touch has been played in Chile since 1998 by initiative of foreign residents in the country, where Chilean players and teams were added, giving way to the creation of the official body Touch Rugby Chile.

Currently in Chile, touch is played in different cities:

Santiago: Santiago Touch Rugby league, which brings together 16 teams and played in mixed category.

Senior Touch league: which brings together 7 teams, it is played only by men over 40 years, once a month. The league adopted the official Touch rules in 2016, being supported by referees who belong to the Federation of Chile Touch.

Schools: It is practiced in several schools where rugby is played.

Touch is also developing in regions outside of Santiago like Rancagua and Paine.

Chile participates in the following international tournaments:

Torneo Trasandino: This tournament has been held since 2014 in the cities of Cordoba, Mendoza and Santiago (three tournaments a year), with the participation of teams from the cities mentioned, plus Rancagua and Paine.

USA Touch Nationals & International Club Open. This league is held annually in the United States, with the participation of several states of that nation plus other countries like Chile, which is attending since 2012.

Touch World Cup. The last edition was 2015 in Australia. Chile participated for the first time, achieving an outstanding participation: Bronze group winners and ranked No. 13 of the FIT Open Mixed Division.

=== England ===
The England Touch Association (ETA) was formed in 1995 and by the end of 2021 had grown to 106 member clubs and over 2,000 individual members. The ETA oversees both elite and development National Touch Series events in the summer for single-gender and mixed teams. In addition, the annual Touch Nationals provides competition for representative regional sides in open, juniors, seniors and masters divisions. All ETA tournaments are live-streamed on YouTube. The ETA's national high performance programme includes seven England men's squads, five women's squads and two mixed squads.

=== France ===
Touch France is the national association in charge of the development of the Touch in France. The French Men's Over 30s is the first French team to win an international competition by winning the 2012 Euros in Treviso. In the very same category, France Men's Over 30s won a bronze medal in Putrajaya, Malaysia in the 9th Touch Football World Cup.

=== Germany ===
Touch is played in Germany since 2003 by round about 500 active players. In 2005, the official national governing body Touch Deutschland Sportverein (TDSV) was founded, which is a full member of the FIT and has sent teams to the European Cup and World Championships. Clubs now exist in Berlin, Bonn, Frankfurt, Freiburg, Gießen, Hamburg, Heidelberg, Cologne (Köln), Leipzig, Munich, Osnabrück, Paderborn and Rüthen. The German Championships are held every year since 2005. Record title holder is the club from Munich.

=== Italy ===
Italia Touch (IT) is the official body recognised by FIT for the development of the Touch in Italy. Currently there are 23 teams affiliated to IT. It send regularly national teams to International Events in Europe

=== Japan ===
Japan Touch Association (JTA) is the official body recognised by FIT for the development of the Touch in Japan. In 2016, there are 32 clubs recognized by JTA, while 55 teams played for Tokyo Touch tournament. Assuming the recognition rate is 40%, it is estimated 2000 active players in 110 clubs.

=== Malaysia ===
Touch Malaysia (TM) is the official body for the sport in Malaysia and the Malaysian member of the Federation International Touch (FIT) – the International Federation. A number of touch football teams can be found in Malaysia including the Penang Panthers. The Panthers were founded in 2011 by Christopher Woodhams, a Birmingham born philanthropist and educator. Matt Lee, a star player in Australia, helps run the club. Matt took the Asian Club Championships, held in KL in June 2013, by storm and dominated the opposition with his pace and shrewd passing abilities. The Panthers were the best placed Malaysian team at the Asian Club Championship and were the Men's Masters runners up.

=== New Zealand ===
Touch New Zealand is the governing body recognised by the FIT and is charged with developing and grow the game in New Zealand.

Touch in NZ is made up from the 19 provincial regions - Te Tai Tokerau, Auckland, North Harbour, Counties Manukau, Thames Valley, Waikato, King Country Rugby Football Union, Bay of Plenty, Hawkes Bay, Tairāwhiti, Manawatu, Taranaki, Wanganui, Horowhenua-Kapiti, Wellington, Nelson Bays, Christchurch, Otago and Southland. Touch is one of the country's most popular summer sports.

Just over 100,000 registered module players compete around the country; 3500 of these players represent their respective regions at national events (2023 Opens Nationals, Youth Nationals, Masters Nationals, Secondary Nationals).

New Zealand will be competing in the upcoming 2024 World Cup in Nottingham England sending a contingent of 11 teams

The current CEO of Touch New Zealand is Joe Sprangers

=== Scotland ===
Touch has been played in Scotland since 1991 in informal leagues in Edinburgh and Glasgow. The sport soon spread to Aberdeen with a well established league forming soon afterwards.

In 2005, the Scottish Touch Association (STA) was formally constituted as the governing body to help develop the sport. By 2007 the association had welcomed new participants from Dundee, Perth and Stirling to join existing leagues, held its first formal national championships, trained over 150 referees and won the tender to host the 2011 World Cup in Edinburgh.

Singapore

Touch Singapore (TSG) is the governing body recognised by FIT for Touch Football. Established in 2017, Touch Singapore hosts two league competitions every year with over 95 teams entering across 12 category divisions. Singapore has won bronze at two Touch World Cups in 2011 & 2015 in the Women's Open category. There are over 5,000 players playing competitively and socially in Singapore with 2,000 registered players in the league competitions. TSG also host the Singapore International Touch Knockout tournament which see clubs from all over Asia competing over a two-day competition.

=== South Africa ===
Touch in South Africa is overseen by the [South African Touch Association, and is often known as 'Six Down'. South Africa has had national representation at all Touch World Cups since 1995. There are already over 6,000 registered players in South Africa.

=== Switzerland ===
Touch Switzerland (TS) is the official body recognised by FIT for the development of Touch in Switzerland. Switzerland has competed in all European Championships since 2006 and in the 2007 and 2011 World Cup. Switzerland sends teams to contest regular events in other tournaments in Europe. The biggest accomplishment so far is winning the Mainland Cup in Heidelberg in 2009 – coming third in the Women's Open and first in the Men's Open divisions. As of 2020, there are TS-affiliated clubs in Baden, Bagnes, Basel, Bern, Egg, Geneva, Lausanne, Lucerne, Zug and Zurich.

=== United States ===
There are touch communities in Fort Lauderdale, Floria, Orlando, Floria, West Palm Beach, Florida, Portland, Oregon, Phoenix, Arizona, Los Angeles, San Francisco, Washington, D.C., New York City, Chicago, Houston, Dallas, San Diego, Boston, and Sandy, Utah. The current President of United States Federation of Touch is OJ Hawea.

=== Thailand ===
Touch is played regularly in various parts of Thailand, mostly by expats, many of whom are teachers living in Thailand. Touch is particularly popular in Phuket and Bangkok, and is also popular with Thai locals who are gaining an interest in rugby yearly.

== See also ==
- League tag
- Tag rugby
- Flag football – the equivalent spinoff from American football.
