= 2016 Queensland Firebirds season =

Queensland Firebirds season

Queensland Firebirds
- 2016 season
- Head coach: Roselee Jencke
- Captain: Laura Geitz
- Vice-captain: Clare McMeniman
- Main venue: Brisbane Convention and Exhibition Centre

Season results
- Wins–losses: 14–2
- Regular season: 1st (Australian Conference); Challenge Trophy holders
- Finals placing: 1st
- Team colours

Queensland Firebirds seasons
- ← 2015 2017 →

The 2016 Queensland Firebirds season saw the Queensland Firebirds netball team compete in the 2016 ANZ Championship. With a team coached by Roselee Jencke, captained by Laura Geitz and featuring Romelda Aiken, Clare McMeniman and Kim Ravaillion, Firebirds won the Australian Conference, the Challenge Trophy and the overall championship. Firebirds became the first and only team to retain the title. In a repeat of 2015, Firebirds defeated New South Wales Swifts in both the Australian Conference Final and the Grand Final.

== Players ==
=== Player movements ===
Gains and losses
▲ Gains	▼ Losses
Hulita Haukinima (Queensland Fusion); Chelsea Lemke (Southern Force)	Rebecca Bulley (Retirement); Laura Scherian; Verity Simmons (West Coast Fever); Amorette Wild

=== 2016 roster ===
2016 Queensland Firebirds roster
Players
Coaching staff

Nat.	Name	Position(s)	DoB	Height
(Jamaica)	Romelda Aiken	GS, GA	19 November 1988 (aged 27)	1.96 m (6 ft 5 in)
(Australia)	Mahalia Cassidy	WA, C	9 October 1995 (aged 20)	1.73 m (5 ft 8 in)
(Australia)	Laura Clemesha	GK, GD	21 January 1992 (aged 24)	1.90 m (6 ft 3 in)
(Australia)	Beryl Friday	GA, GS, WA	19 January 1994 (aged 22)	1.84 m (6 ft 0 in)
(Australia)	Laura Geitz (c)	GK, GD	4 November 1987 (aged 28)	1.85 m (6 ft 1 in)
(Australia)	Hulita Haukinima	WD, C	14 September 1995 (aged 20)	1.78 m (5 ft 10 in)
(Australia)	Chelsea Lemke	GA, GS		–
(Australia)	Clare McMeniman (vc)	GD, WD	11 July 1985 (aged 30)	1.84 m (6 ft 0 in)
(Australia)	Caitlyn Nevins	WA, C	1 June 1987 (aged 28)	1.73 m (5 ft 8 in)
(Australia)	Kim Ravaillion	C, WD, WA	26 July 1993 (aged 22)	1.75 m (5 ft 9 in)
(Australia)	Gabi Simpson	WD, GD, C	17 October 1992 (aged 23)	1.76 m (5 ft 9 in)
(Australia)	Gretel Tippett	GA,GS	3 July 1993 (aged 22)	1.91 m (6 ft 3 in)

Head coach

- (Australia) Roselee Jencke

Notes

- (c) – Captain
- (cc) – Co-captain
- (vc) – Vice-captain
- – Injury / maternity leave
- (TRP) – Temporary Replacement Player

=== Debutants ===
- Hulita Haukinima made her ANZ Championship and Firebirds debut in the Round 1 match against Mainland Tactix.
- Chelsea Lemke made her ANZ Championship and Firebirds debut in the Round 6 match against Northern Mystics. She came on for the injured Gretel Tippett and subsequently scored 10 from 13.

=== Milestones ===
- Romelda Aiken scored her 5,000th ANZ Championship goal in the grand final.
- Having previously been members of the 2011 and 2015 Queensland Firebirds teams, Romelda Aiken, Laura Geitz and Clare McMeniman all win their third ANZ Championship.

== Pre-season ==
Between 18 and 20 March 2016, Queensland Firebirds played in a three-day event hosted by Northern Mystics at The Trusts Arena. Other participants included Waikato Bay of Plenty Magic, Southern Steel and Adelaide Thunderbirds.

== Regular season ==
=== Fixtures and results ===
Round 1

Fri 1 April	Queensland Firebirds	70 - 55	Mainland Tactix	Brisbane Convention and Exhibition Centre
6:18 AM (AEST)	Romelda Aiken 45/49 (92%); Gretel Tippett 25/32 (78%)	Report	Mwai Kumwenda 37/39 (95%); Bailey Mes 18/28 (64%)

Round 2

Mon 11 April	Queensland Firebirds	61 - 45	Central Pulse	Brisbane Convention and Exhibition Centre
7:18 PM (AEST)	Romelda Aiken 38/41 (93%); Gretel Tippett 22/25 (88%); Beryl Friday 1/3 (33%)	Report	Ameliaranne Wells 22/24 (92%); Maia Wilson 21/30 (70%); Te Amo Amaru-Tibble 1/1 (100%)

Round 3

Sat 16 April	Melbourne Vixens	47 - 58	Queensland Firebirds	Hisense Arena
5.18 PM (AEST)	Alice Teague-Neeld 15/22 (68%); Kimberley Commane 10/14 (71%); Emma Ryde 22/25 (88%)	Report	Romelda Aiken 42/45 (93%); Gretel Tippett 16/21 (76%)

Round 4

Sat 23 April	Adelaide Thunderbirds	46 - 58	Queensland Firebirds	Priceline Stadium
4.48 AM (ACST)	Kristina Brice 28/34 (82%); Erin Bell 18/27 (67%)	Report	Romelda Aiken 37/46 (80%); Gretel Tippett 21/32 (66%); Beryl Friday 0/1 (0%)

Round 5

Sat 30 April	Queensland Firebirds	61 - 51	New South Wales Swifts	Brisbane Entertainment Centre
5:18 PM (AEST)	Romelda Aiken 52/63 (83%); Gretel Tippett 9/16 (56%)	Report	Susan Pettitt 19/23 (83%); Caitlin Thwaites 32/36 (89%)

Round 6

Sat 7 May	Queensland Firebirds	70 - 42	Northern Mystics	Brisbane Convention and Exhibition Centre
5:18 PM (AEST)	Romelda Aiken 52/57 (91%); Gretel Tippett 8/10 (80%); Chelsea Lemke 10/13 (77%)	Report	Maria Tutaia 23/33 (70%); Cathrine Tuivaiti 9/9 (100%); Megan Craig 10/15 (67%)

Round 7

Sat 14 May	West Coast Fever	52 - 61	Queensland Firebirds	HBF Stadium
3:18 PM (AWST)	Caitlin Bassett 38/46 (83%); Natalie Medhurst 14/21 (67%)	Report	Romelda Aiken 50/57 (88%); Chelsea Lemke 11/16 (69%)

Round 8

Sun 22 May	Queensland Firebirds	62 - 51	Adelaide Thunderbirds	Brisbane Convention and Exhibition Centre
12:18 PM (AEST)	Romelda Aiken 45/50 (90%); Gretel Tippett 17/26 (65%)	Report	Carla Borrego 33/36 (92%); Erin Bell 18/22 (82%)

Round 9

Sun 29 May	New South Wales Swifts	58 - 54	Queensland Firebirds	Qudos Bank Arena
12:18 PM (AEST)	Susan Pettitt 33/39 (85%); Caitlin Thwaites 10/14 (71%); Stephanie Wood 15/19 (79%)	Report	Romelda Aiken 46/51 (90%); Gretel Tippett 8/12 (67%)	Attendance: 13,314

Round 10

Sat 4 June	Queensland Firebirds	56 - 44	Melbourne Vixens	Gold Coast Convention and Exhibition Centre
5:18 PM (AEST)	Romelda Aiken 39/43 (91%); Gretel Tippett 17/23 (74%)	Report	Alice Teague-Neeld 11/17 (65%); Karyn Bailey 19/25 (76%); Kimberly Commane 14/19 (74%)

Round 11

Sat 11 June	Southern Steel	66 - 51	Queensland Firebirds	Edgar Centre
4:10 PM (NZST)	Jhaniele Fowler-Reid 51/57 (89%); Te Paea Selby-Rickit 15/17 (88%); Brooke Leaver 0/1 (0%)	Report	Romelda Aiken 27/32 (84%); Gretel Tippett 16/19 (84%); Beryl Friday 8/9 (89%)

Round 12

Queensland Firebirds received a bye.

Round 13

Mon 27 June	Waikato Bay of Plenty Magic	47 - 71	Queensland Firebirds	Claudelands Arena
7:40 PM (NZST)	Joanne Harten 32/38 (84%); Paula Griffin 15/21 (71%)	Report	Romelda Aiken 50/59 (85%); Gretel Tippett 21/27 (78%)

Round 14

Sun 3 July	Queensland Firebirds	63 - 52	West Coast Fever	Brisbane Convention and Exhibition Centre
12:18 PM (AEST)	Romelda Aiken 49/54 (91%); Gretel Tippett 14/18 (78%)	Report	Caitlin Bassett 39/41 (95%); Natalie Medhurst 8/10 (80%); Kate Beveridge 5/7 (71%)

=== Final standings ===
2016 Australian Conference
Pos	Team	Pld	W	D	L	GF	GA	GD	G%	Pts
1	Queensland Firebirds	13	11	2	0	796	656	140	121.3%	22
2	New South Wales Swifts	13	10	2	1	828	670	158	123.6%	21
3	Melbourne Vixens	13	8	5	0	731	679	52	107.7%	16
4	West Coast Fever	13	7	6	0	756	707	49	106.9%	14
5	Adelaide Thunderbirds	13	2	11	0	660	775	-115	85.2%	4
2016 New Zealand Conference
Pos	Team	Pld	W	D	L	GF	GA	GD	G%	Pts
1	Southern Steel	13	11	0	2	852	732	120	116.4%	24
2	Waikato Bay of Plenty Magic	13	6	7	0	665	755	-90	88.1%	12
3	Northern Mystics	13	3	9	1	674	743	-69	90.7%	7
5	Mainland Tactix	13	2	10	1	708	825	-117	85.8%	5
4	Central Pulse	13	2	10	1	676	804	-128	84.1%	5

Qualified for Conference finals
Qualified for Elimination finals

- Pld = Games played
- W = Win (2 points)
- D = Draw (1 points)
- L = Loss (0 points)
- GF = Goals For
- GA = Goals Against
- GD = Goals Difference (= GF−GA)
- G% = Goal percentage (= 100 × GF/GA)
- Pts = Points

=== Challenge Trophy ===
Queensland Firebirds began their defence of the Challenge Trophy in Round 1 against Mainland Tactix. Firebirds were unbeaten at home throughout the season and, as a result, retained the Challenge Trophy.

Round	Holders	Score	Challengers
Round 1	Queensland Firebirds	70–55	Mainland Tactix
Round 2	Queensland Firebirds	61–45	Central Pulse
Round 5	Queensland Firebirds	61–51	New South Wales Swifts
Round 6	Queensland Firebirds	70–42	Northern Mystics
Round 8	Queensland Firebirds	62–51	Adelaide Thunderbirds
Round 10	Queensland Firebirds	56–44	Melbourne Vixens
Round 14	Queensland Firebirds	63–52	West Coast Fever

== Finals ==
=== Conference Final ===
18 July 2016; 7.18 (AEST)	Stats	Queensland Firebirds	63–52	New South Wales Swifts	Brisbane Entertainment Centre
18 July 2016; 7.18 (AEST)	Stats	Scoring by quarter: 16-12, 16-15, 15-10, 16-15			Brisbane Entertainment Centre
18 July 2016; 7.18 (AEST)	Stats	Romelda Aiken 49/55 (89%); Gretel Tippett 14		Caitlin Thwaites 17; Susan Pettitt 30; Stephanie Wood 5	Brisbane Entertainment Centre

=== Semi-finals ===
24 July 2016; 12.18 pm (AEST)	Stats	Queensland Firebirds	67–64	Southern Steel	Brisbane Entertainment Centre
24 July 2016; 12.18 pm (AEST)	Stats	Scoring by quarter: 19 - 16, 13 - 19, 15 - 14, 20 -15			Brisbane Entertainment Centre
24 July 2016; 12.18 pm (AEST)	Stats	Romelda Aiken 57/68 (84%); Gretel Tippett 10/13 (77%)		Jhaniele Fowler-Reid 51/52 (98%); Te Paea Selby-Rickit 13/20 (65%)	Brisbane Entertainment Centre

=== Grand Final ===
31 July 2016; 12.10 pm (AEST)	Stats	Queensland Firebirds	69–67	New South Wales Swifts	ET	Brisbane Entertainment Centre; Attendance: 10,312	Fox Sports; Sky Sport
31 July 2016; 12.10 pm (AEST)	Stats	Scoring by quarter: 12-15, 17-12, 12-15, 13-12, ET: 15-13			ET	Brisbane Entertainment Centre; Attendance: 10,312	Fox Sports; Sky Sport
31 July 2016; 12.10 pm (AEST)	Stats	Scoring by half: 29-27, 25-27 ET: 15-13			ET	Brisbane Entertainment Centre; Attendance: 10,312	Fox Sports; Sky Sport
31 July 2016; 12.10 pm (AEST)	Stats	Romelda Aiken 63/89 (71%); Gretel Tippett 6/11 (55%)		Susan Pettitt 30/39 (77%); Caitlin Thwaites 34/41 (83%); Stephanie Wood 3/4 (75%)	ET	Brisbane Entertainment Centre; Attendance: 10,312	Fox Sports; Sky Sport

== Award winners ==
=== Queensland Firebirds Awards ===
Award	Winner
Player of the Year	(Jamaica) Romelda Aiken
Firebirds Players' Player	(Australia) Clare McMeniman
Firebirds Spirit Award	(Australia) Caitlyn Nevins
Firebirds Members Award	(Australia) Gabi Simpson

=== ANZ Championship awards ===
Award	Winner
ANZ Championship Finals Series MVP	(Australia) Kim Ravaillion

=== All Star Team ===
Position	Player
GS	(Jamaica) Romelda Aiken
C	(Australia) Kim Ravaillion
GD	(Australia) Clare McMeniman

=== Australian Netball Awards ===
Award	Winner
Australian ANZ Championship Coach of the Year	Roselee Jencke

== Gallery ==
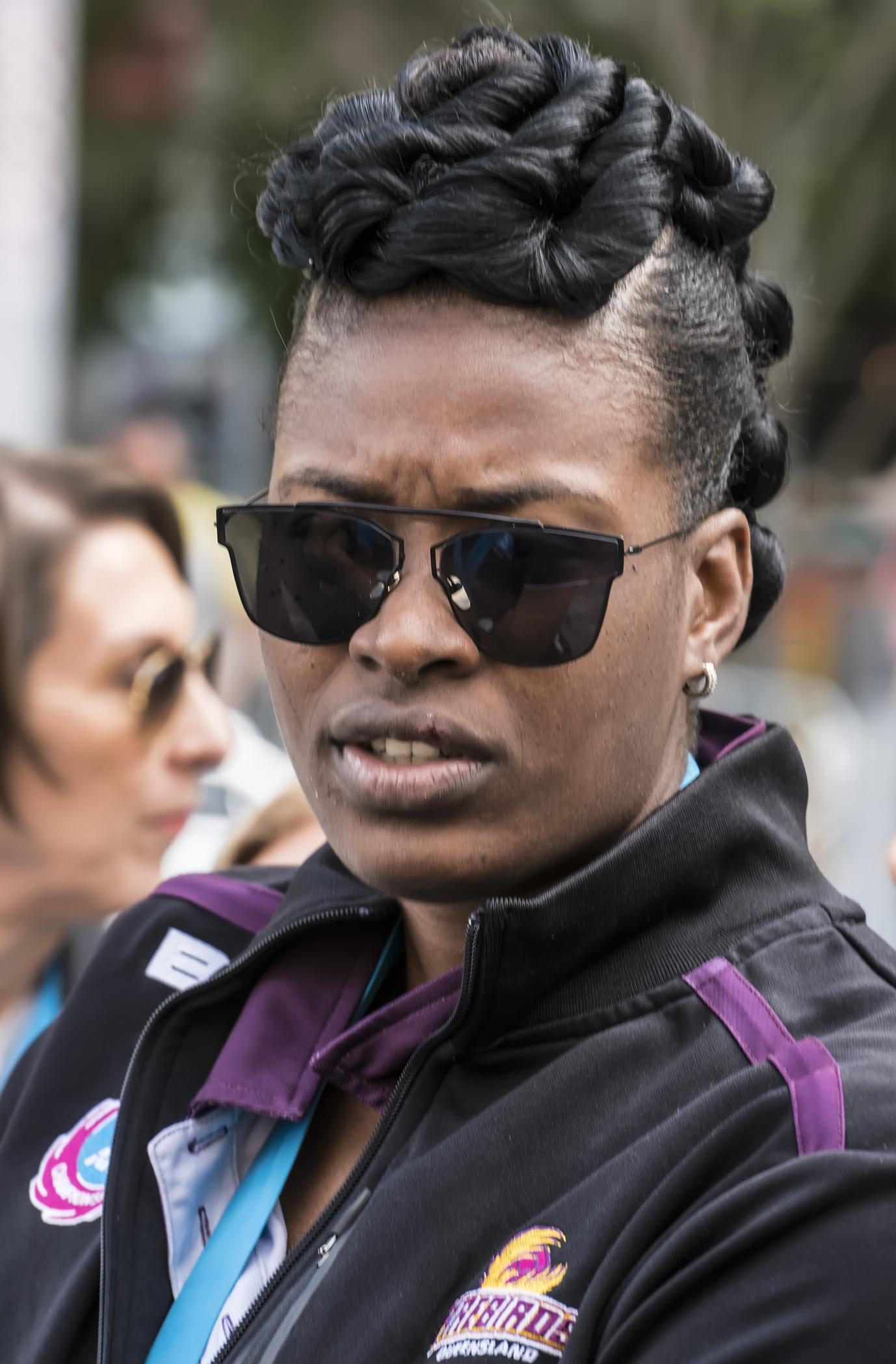
6 August 2016; Romelda Aiken, 2016 ANZ Championship All Star and Firebirds Player of the Year.

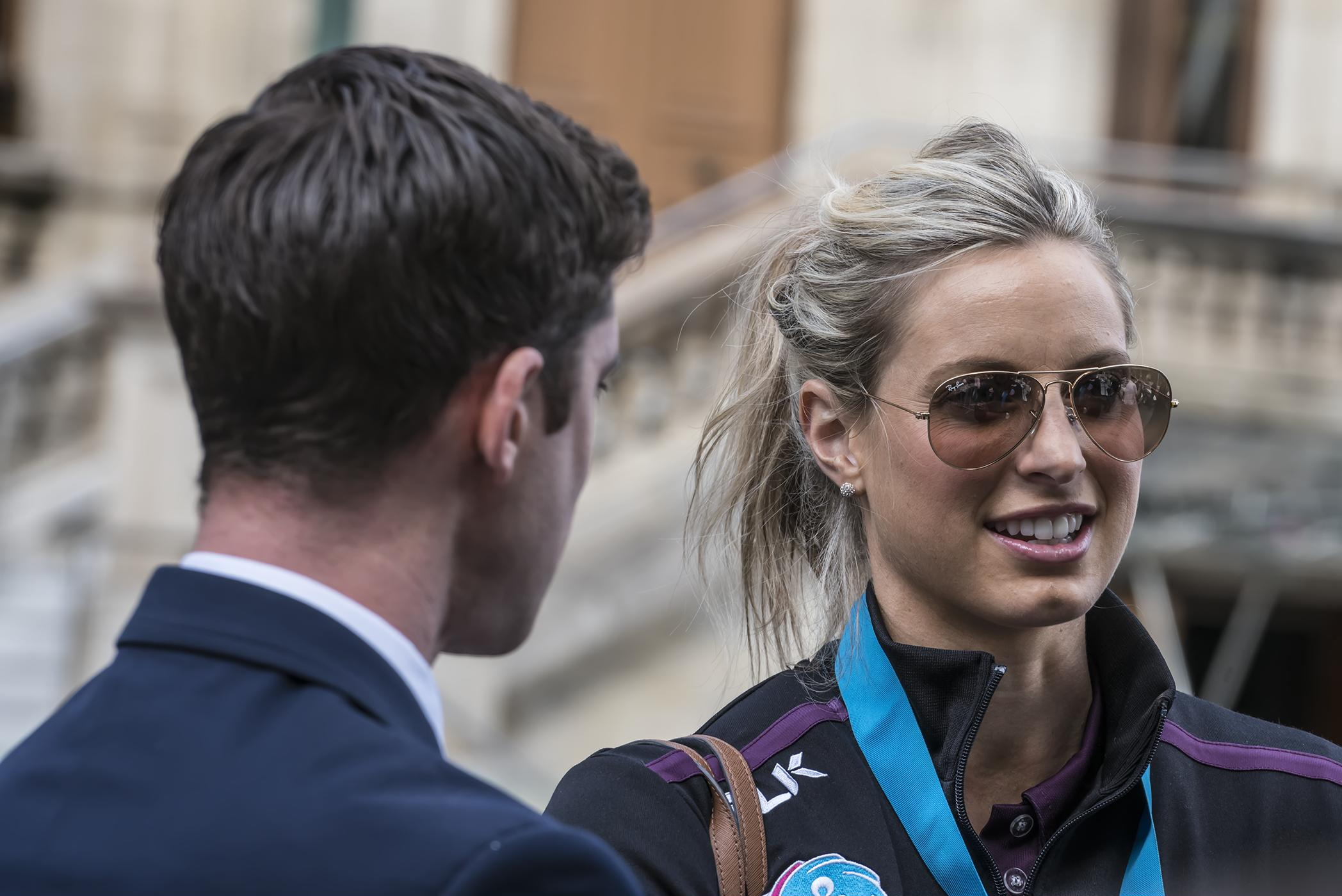
6 August 2016; Laura Geitz captained Queensland Firebirds to the 2016 ANZ Championship

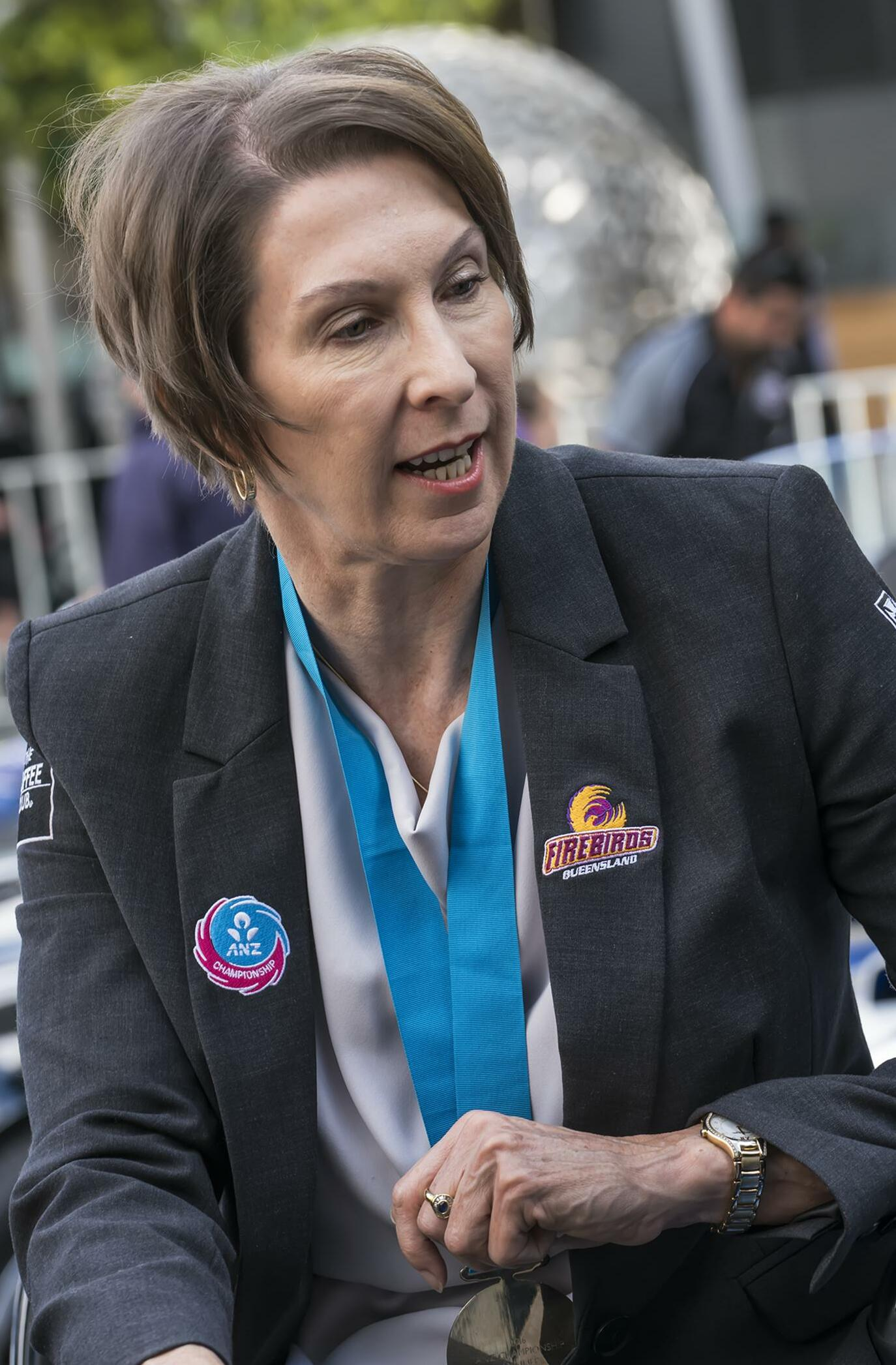
6 August 2016; Roselee Jencke, the 2016 Australian ANZ Championship Coach of the Year guided Queensland Firebirds to the 2016 ANZ Championship

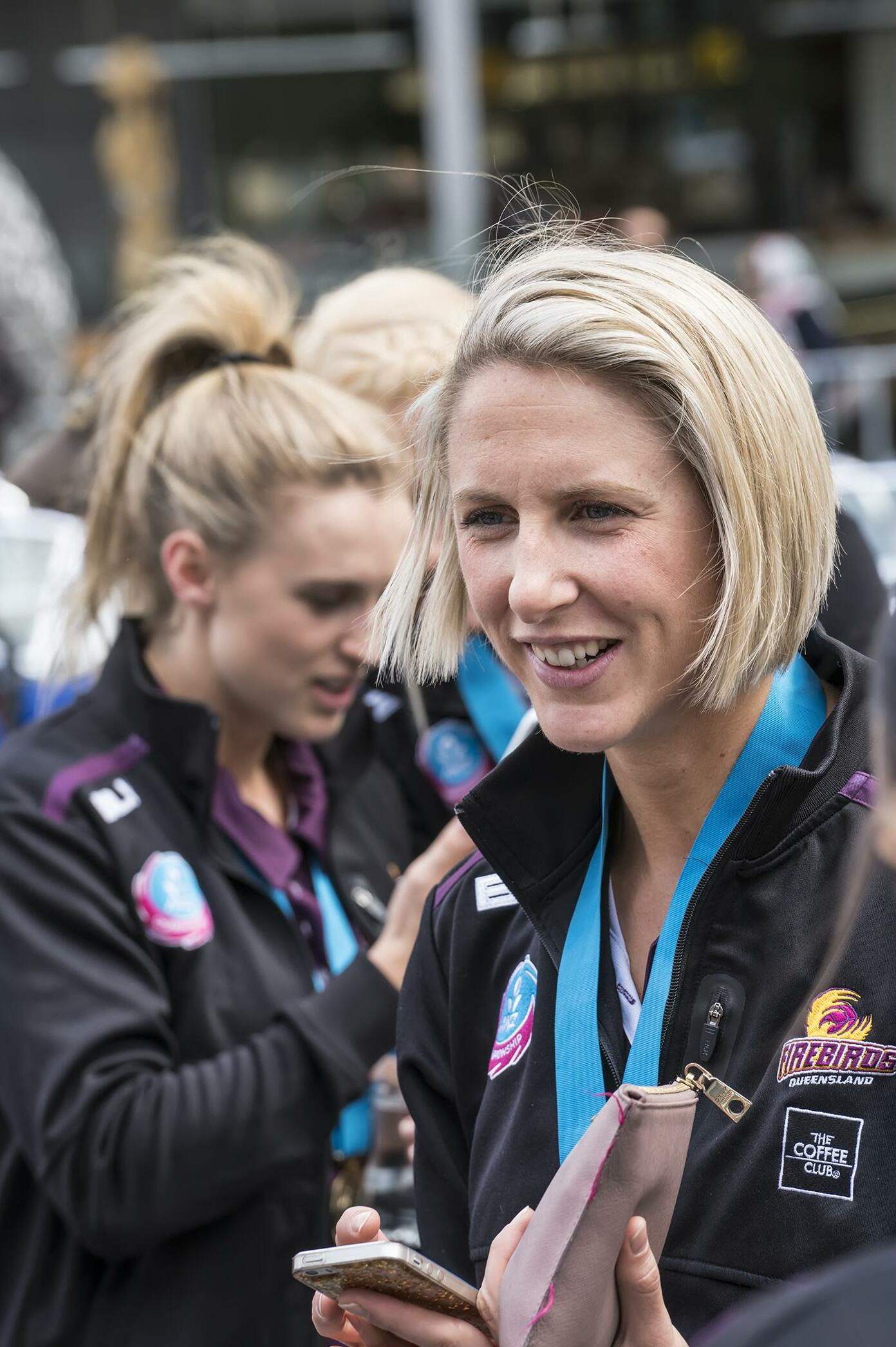
6 August 2016; Clare McMeniman, 2016 ANZ Championship All Star and Firebirds Players' Player

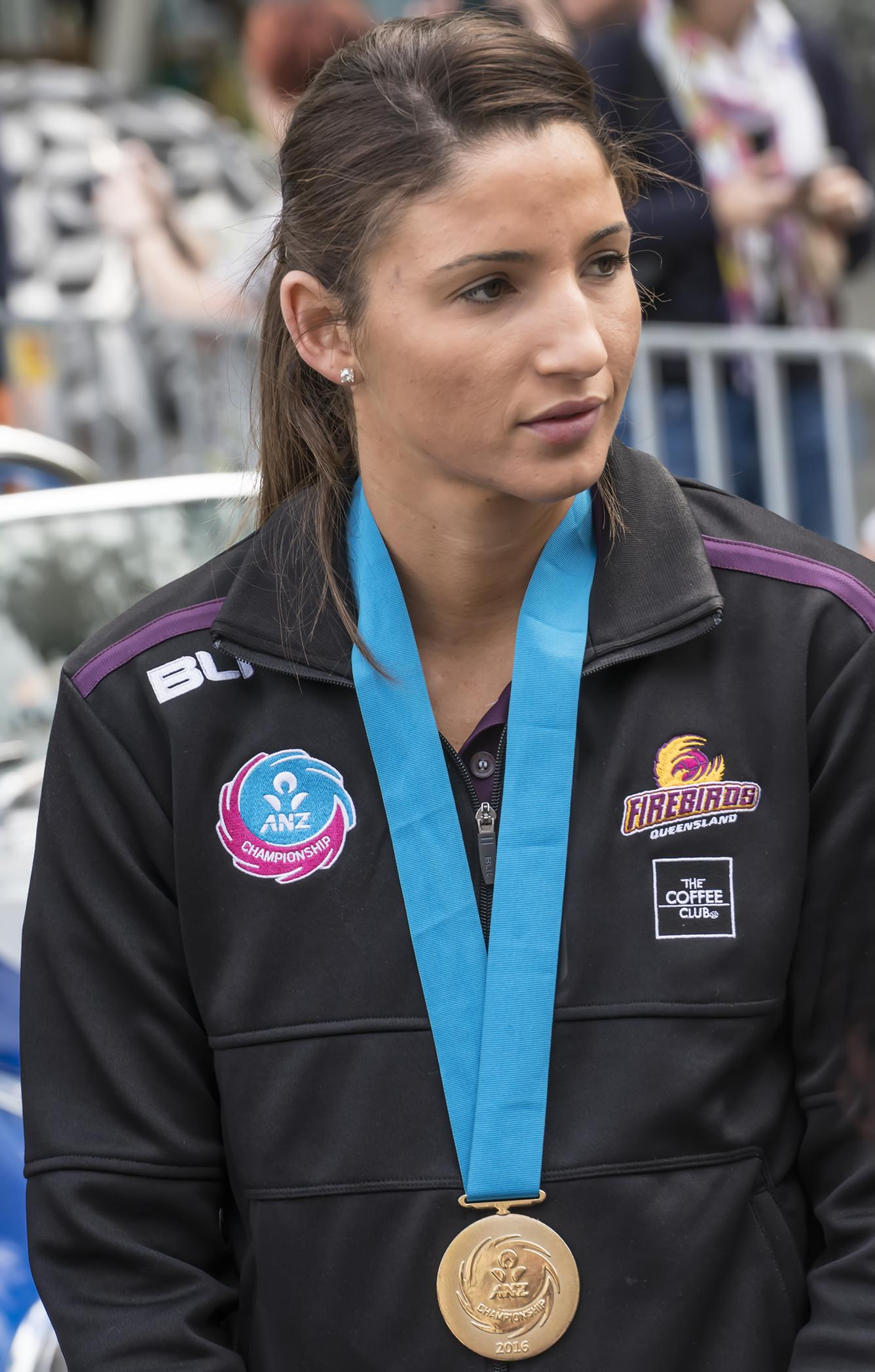
6 August 2016; Kim Ravaillion, 2016 ANZ Championship All Star and ANZ Championship Finals Series MVP.
