= Hulita Veve =

Australian netball player

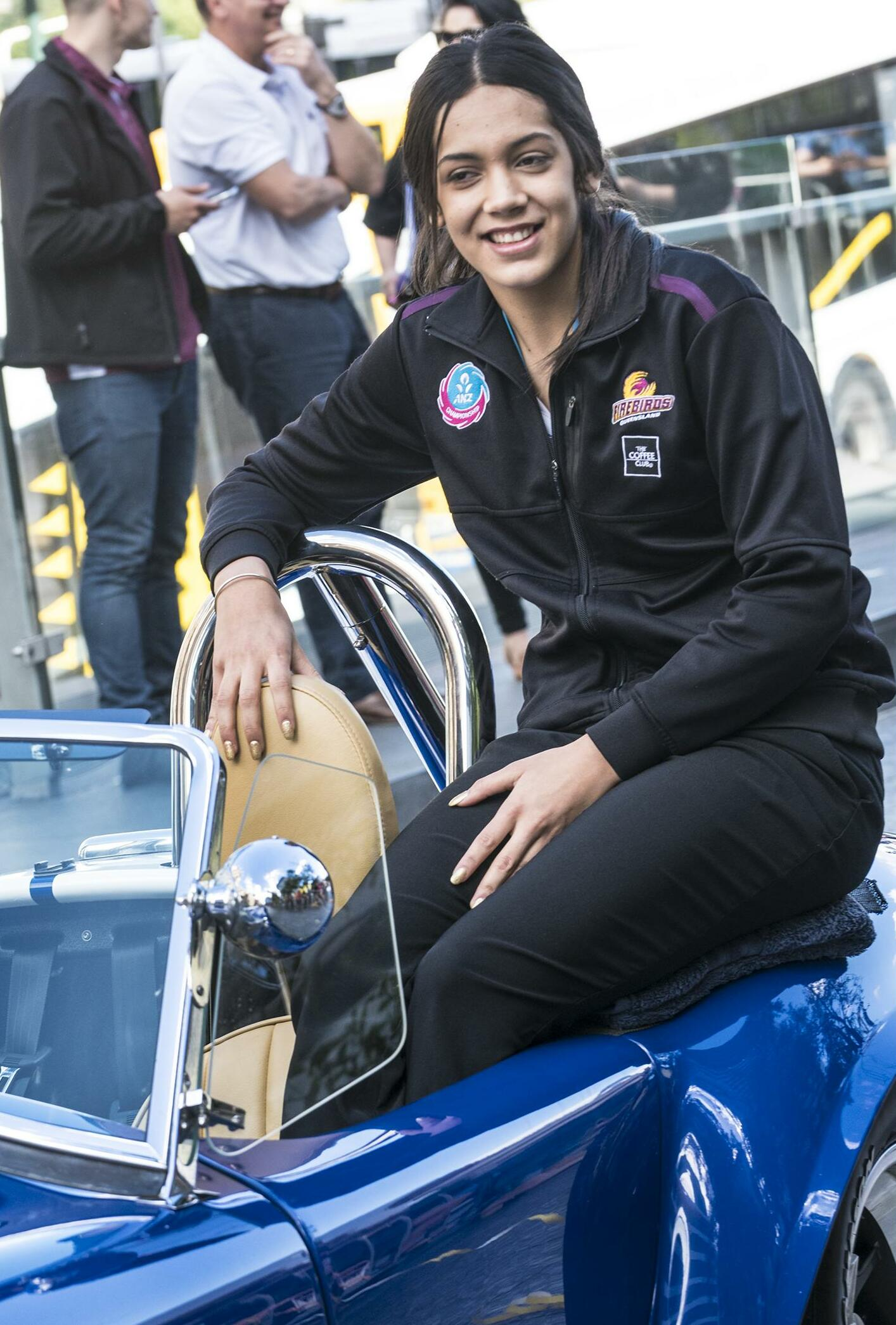

Personal information
- Full name: Hulita Veve (Née: Haukinima)
- Born: 14 September 1995 (age 31)
- Height: 1.78 m (5 ft 10 in)
- School: Marsden State School; Marsden State High School

Netball career
- Playing positions: GD, WD, WA, C
Years	Club team	Apps
2014–2019	Queensland Fusion	
2016–	Queensland Firebirds	
2021–	Queensland Sapphires	
2018	Brisbane South Wildcats	
2019–2020	→ QUT Wildcats	
2021	QUT Netball	

Hulita Veve (born 14 September 1995), previously known as Hulita Haukinima, is a Tongan netball player. Haukinima was a member of the Queensland Firebirds team that won the 2016 ANZ Championship. She has also played for Queensland Fusion in the Australian Netball League and for Firebirds in Suncorp Super Netball. In 2014 she was captain of the Queensland under-19 team that won their Australian National Netball Championships tournament. In 2019 she captained the QUT Wildcats team that won the inaugural HART Sapphire Series title.

== Early life, family and education ==
Haukinima was born-and-raised in Queensland. She grew up in the Beenleigh and Marsden suburbs of Logan City. She attended Marsden State School and Marsden State High School. While a member of the 2016 Queensland Firebirds ANZ Championship winning team, she worked as a childcare worker in Browns Plains. Haukinima is married to Jerome Veve and is the mother of two boys, Jakiah and Jeremiah. Jerome is a United States rugby league international.

== Playing career ==
=== Queensland ===
Between 2011 and 2015, Haukinima represented Queensland at the Australian National Netball Championships at under-17, under-19 and under-21 levels. In 2014 she was captain of the under-19 team that finished as champions. In 2015 she was vice-captain of the under-21 team.

=== Queensland Fusion ===
Between 2014 and 2019, Haukinima played for Queensland Fusion in the Australian Netball League. In 2014 she was a member of the Fusion team that finished as runners up. In 2021, she was included squads for Fusion's successor team, Queensland Sapphires.

=== Queensland Firebirds ===
Haukinima has been a member of Queensland Firebirds squads since 2016. She made her ANZ Championship debut for Firebirds on 1 April 2016 in a Round 1 match against Mainland Tactix. She was subsequently a member of the Firebirds squad that won the 2016 ANZ Championship. She missed the 2017 season with the birth of her first child. Since 2018, now playing as Hulita Veve, she has served as a Firebirds training partner. Veve played one match in 2021, the Round 14 match against Melbourne Vixens.

=== Queensland state netball leagues ===
Veve has played for Brisbane South Wildcats/QUT Wildcats in both the Queensland State Netball League and the HART Sapphire Series. In 2019 she captained Wildcats when they won the inaugural HART Sapphire Series title. She was subsequently awarded the Katie Walker Medal after being named the 2019 HART Sapphire Series MVP. She again played for Wildcats during the 2020 season. In 2021 she switched to the new franchise, QUT Netball, and helped them reach the grand final which they lost to Brisbane North Cougars.

=== Australia ===
In 2014 and 2015, Haukinima played for Netball Australia's Centre of Excellence team based out of the Australian Institute of Sport. In 2015 she played in a series of Netball World Cup warm-up matches against Scotland, Wales and Tasmanian Spirit. During the series she switched from her regular wing defence position and played primarily as a centre. She was subsequently named player-of-the-match in two of the three games.

=== Tonga ===
In June 2023 she was selected for the Tonga national netball team for the 2023 Netball World Cup.

== Honours ==
Queensland Firebirds

- ANZ Championship
  - Winners: 2016

Queensland Fusion

- Australian Netball League
  - Runners up: 2014

Queensland

- Australian National Netball Championships
  - Winner: Under-19 (2014)

QUT Wildcats

- HART Sapphire Series
  - Winners: 2019

QUT Netball

- HART Sapphire Series
  - Runners up:: 2021

Individual Awards

Year	Award
2015–16	City of Logan Sports Award Winners – Sportswoman
2019	Katie Walker Medal
