= Beryl Friday =

Australian netball player

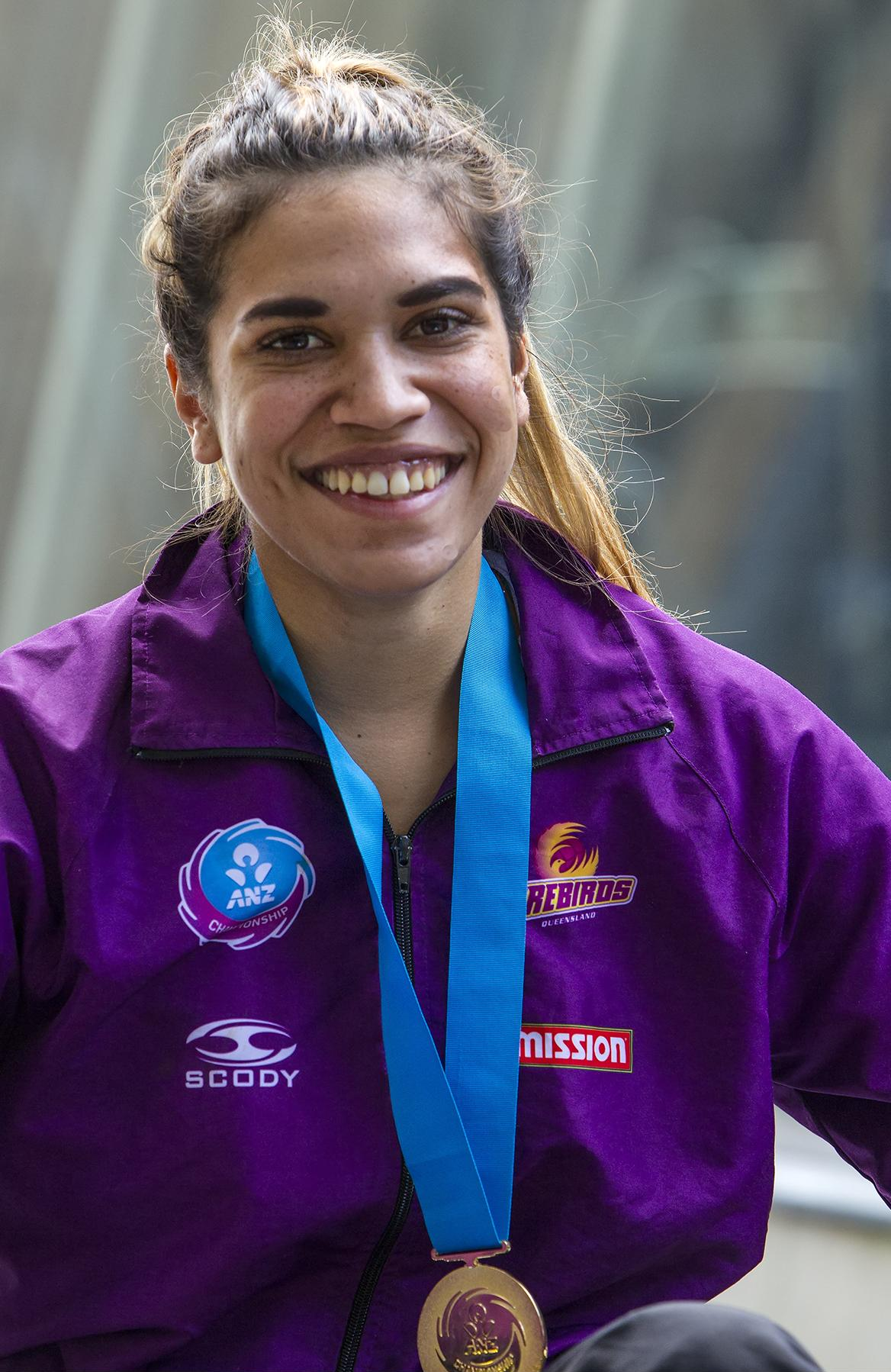

Personal information
- Full name: Beryl Friday
- Born: 19 January 1994 (age 32) Ingham, North Queensland
- Height: 1.84 m (6 ft 0 in)
- School: St Margaret's Anglican Girls' School
- University: Griffith University

Netball career
- Playing positions: GA, GS, WA
Years	Club team	Apps
2012–2014	CLC Tigers	
2012–2016	Queensland Fusion	
2015–2016	Queensland Firebirds	
2017	Territory Storm	
2018	Canberra Giants	
2018	CLC Tigers	
2018–2019	Team Bath	
2019	West Coast Fever	
2020	QUT Wildcats	
2021	USQ Ipswich Jets	

Beryl Friday (born 19 January 1994) is an Australian netball player. Friday was a member of the Queensland Firebirds teams that won the 2015 and 2016 ANZ Championships. She has also played for Queensland Fusion, Territory Storm and Canberra Giants in the Australian Netball League, Team Bath in the Netball Superleague and West Coast Fever in Suncorp Super Netball.

== Early life, family and education ==
Friday is an Aboriginal Australian woman from Ingham, North Queensland. She is a Kuku Nyungkal woman of the Kuku Yalanji nation. She is also a descendant of the Olkolo, the Birri Gubba and the Kamilaroi nations. She was one of five children. Her mother and two older sisters were keen netballers and at eight years old, Beryl was taken to the local courts of the Herbert River Netball Association. While attending a coaching clinic in Townsville, she was spotted by Vicki Wilson. She subsequently gained a sports scholarship to attend St Margaret's Anglican Girls' School. As of 2021, Friday is studying for an education degree at Griffith University. She was an inaugural recipient of a scholarship named in honour of Ron Clarke.

== Playing career ==
=== Queensland ===
Between 2011 and 2015, Friday represented Queensland at the Australian National Netball Championships at under-17, under-19 and under-21 levels. She was a vice captain of the 2014 under-21 team and she captained the 2015 under-21 team.

=== Queensland Firebirds ===
Friday was a member of the Queensland Firebirds teams that won the 2015 and 2016 ANZ Championships.

=== Australian Netball League ===
Queensland Fusion

Between 2012 and 2015, Friday played for Queensland Fusion in the Australian Netball League. She helped Fusion finish as runners up in the 2014 season.

Territory Storm

In 2017, Friday played for Territory Storm in the Australian Netball League.

Canberra Giants

During the 2018 season, Friday played for Canberra Giants in the Australian Netball League. She helped Giants finish as runners up in the ANL. In the grand final against Tasmanian Magpies, Friday scored 22 from 29.

=== Team Bath ===
Friday played for Team Bath in the 2018 British Fast5 Netball All-Stars Championship and the 2019 Netball Superleague. On 5 January 2019, she made her Netball Superleague debut in a 58–41 Round 1 win against Celtic Dragons.

=== West Coast Fever ===
Friday played for West Coast Fever during the 2019 Suncorp Super Netball season as a temporary replacement player for Kaylia Stanton. She made her debut for Fever on 3 August 2019 in the Round 11 match against Melbourne Vixens.

=== Queensland state netball leagues ===
Friday has played for several teams in various Queensland state netball league competitions. She played for Carina Leagues Club Tigers in the Queensland Champions Cup, winning the MVP award in 2013 and 2014. In 2014 she shared the award with Abigail Latu-Meafou. She played for Tigers again in 2018. Friday has played in the HART Sapphire Series for QUT Wildcats in 2020 and for USQ Ipswich Jets in 2021.

== Coach, mentor and ambassador ==
In February 2021, together with Sharon Finnan, Friday became a founding member of Netball Queensland's Aboriginal And Torres Strait Islander Advisory Committee. Since February 2021, Friday has served as an ambassador for the Brisbane Broncos' Beyond the Broncos Girls Academy. In March 2021, Friday was named as an assistant coach for the Netball Queensland's under-17 team at the Australian National Netball Championships.

== Honours ==
Queensland Firebirds

- ANZ Championship
  - Winners: 2015, 2016

Carina Leagues Club Tigers

- Holden Cruze Cup
  - Winners: 2012

Canberra Giants

- Australian Netball League
  - Runners up: 2018

Queensland Fusion

- Australian Netball League
  - Runners up: 2014

== Gallery ==
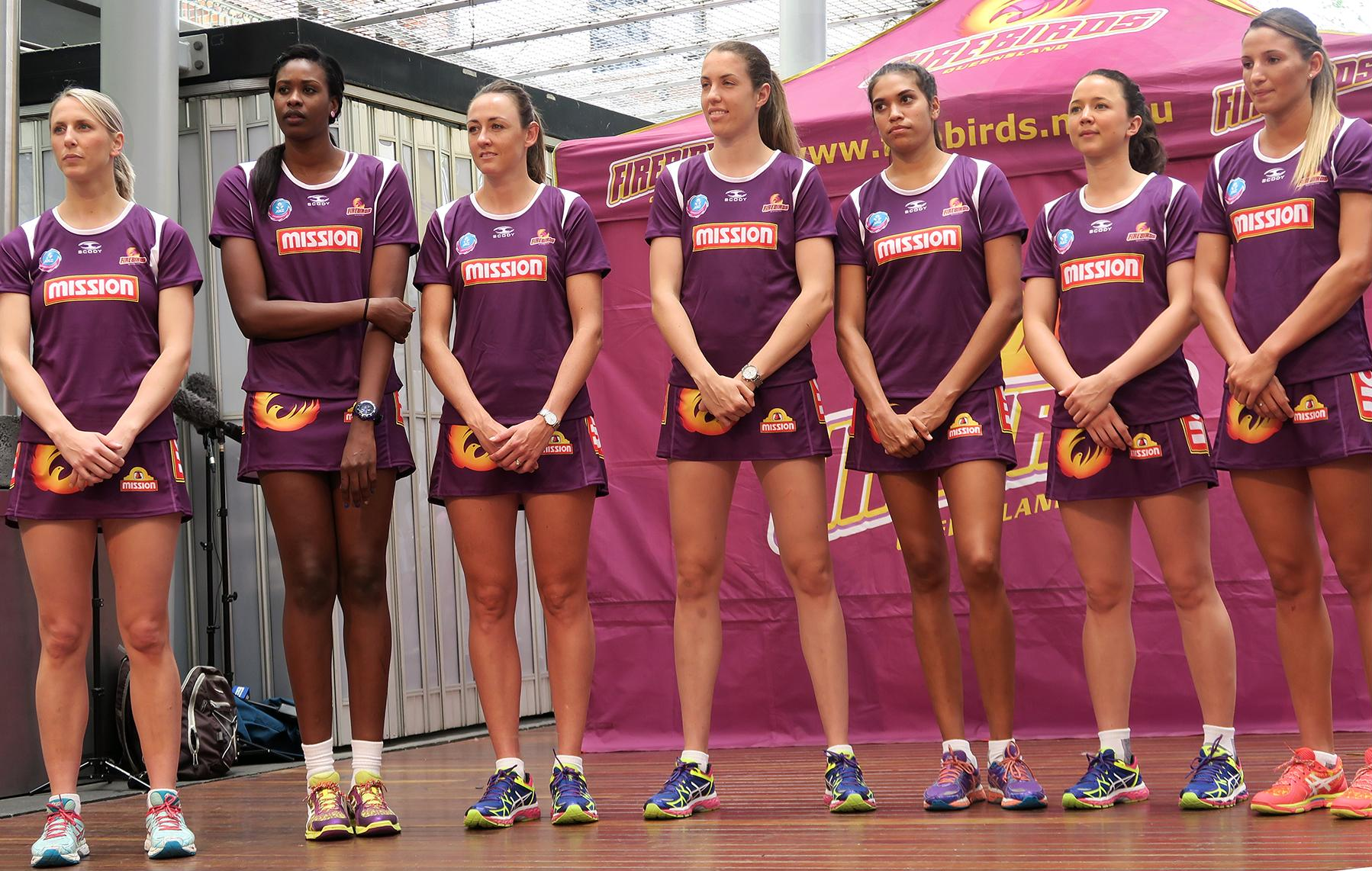
21 January 2015; Beryl Friday (third from right) with members of the 2015 Queensland Firebirds team. From left to right, Clare McMeniman, Romelda Aiken, Rebecca Bulley, Laura Clemesha, Friday, Caitlyn Nevins and Kim Ravaillion.

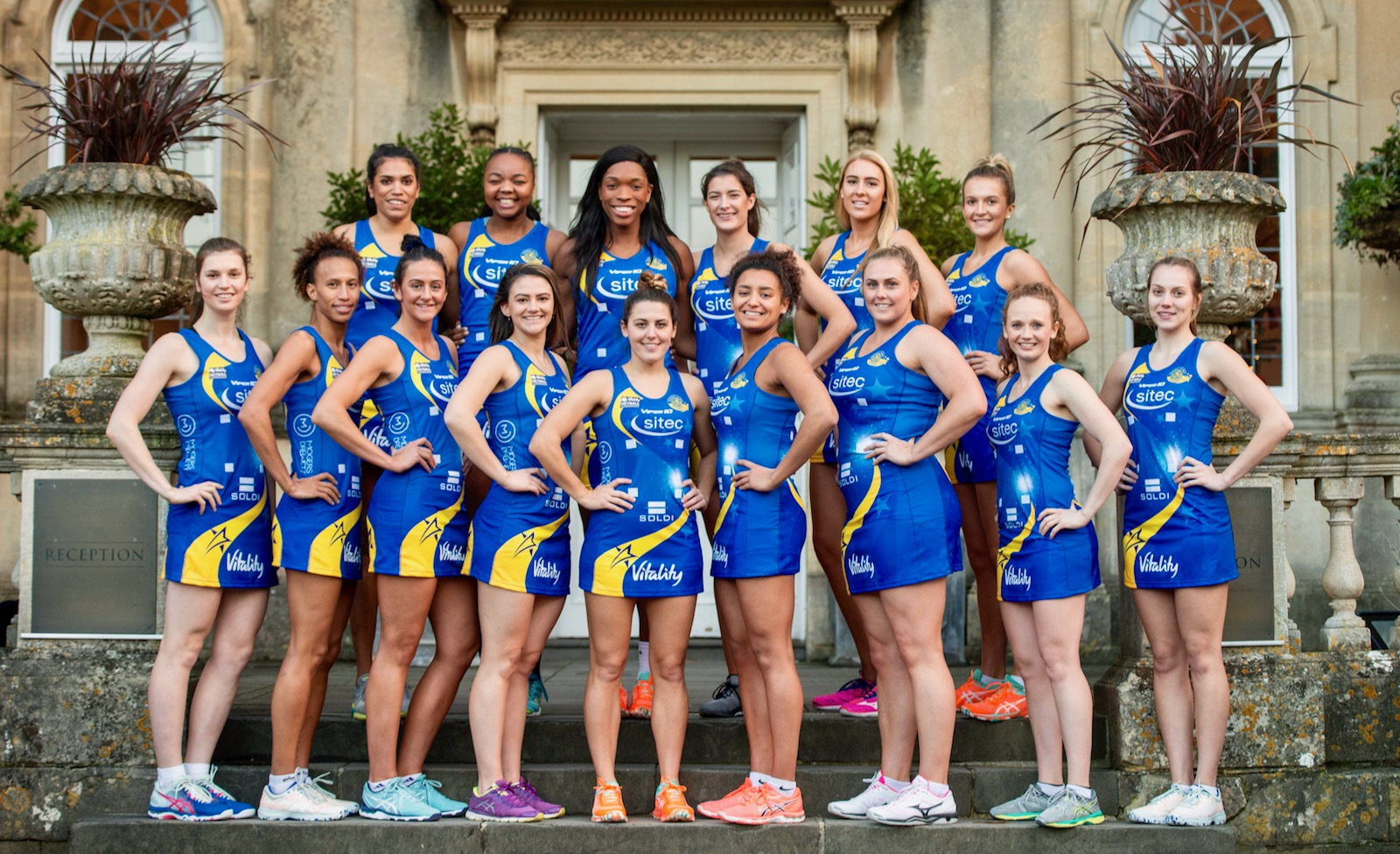
7 December 2018; Beryl Friday (top row, first left) with the 2019 Team Bath squad
