= Katie Walker (netball) =

Australian netball player

Personal information
- Full name: Katie Walker (Née: Buchanan)
- Born: 18 July 1978 (age 48) Brisbane, Australia
- Height: 1.73 m (5 ft 8 in)
- Spouse: Shane Walker
- Relatives: Chris Walker (brother-in-law); Ben Walker (brother-in-law); Sam Walker (nephew)

Netball career
- Playing positions: C, WA
Years	Club team	Apps
2004–2006	Hunter Jaegers	32
2006	→ Manly-Warringah	
2007–2008	Queensland Firebirds	
2009–	Queensland Fusion	
c. 2012–2019	CLC Tigers	
Coaching career
- Years: Team
- 2021–: Queensland Sapphires

Katie Walker is a former Australian netball player and current netball coach. Walker played for both Hunter Jaegers and Queensland Firebirds during the Commonwealth Bank Trophy era. She also played for Firebirds during the 2008 ANZ Championship season. Since 2020, Walker has been a member of the Firebirds coaching staff, serving as an assistant coach, specialist coach and head coach of Queensland Sapphires.

== Family ==
Walker, née Buchanan, is married to Shane Walker, a rugby league player. Their first child, a daughter, Kobi, was born in November 2006.

== Playing career ==
=== Hunter Jaegers ===
Between 2004 and 2006, while her husband Shane was playing for South Sydney, Walker made 32 appearances for Hunter Jaegers in the Commonwealth Bank Trophy league. She was a vice-captain to Jane Altschwager while playing for Jaegers.

=== Manly-Warringah ===
Walker played for Manly-Warringah in the New South Wales state netball league and in 2006 featured in the grand final when she was 27 weeks' pregnant. In 2006 she shared the Nance Kenny OAM Medal, the league's MVP award.

=== Queensland Firebirds ===
Between 2007 and 2008, Walker played for Queensland Firebirds. She trialed for five successive years to be part of the Firebirds team but missed out each time. In 2007 she was included in Firebirds' Commonwealth Bank Trophy squad. She also played for Firebirds during the 2008 ANZ Championship season. However, she was controversially dropped from the Firebirds lineup for the 2009 season. She was initially cut from the preliminary team list against the wishes of head coach, Vicki Wilson. After Megan Dehn withdrew from the squad, Wilson wanted to re-sign Walker. However, Netball Queensland overruled her decision and offered Carla Dziwoki a contract instead.

=== Queensland Fusion ===
Walker played for Queensland Fusion during the 2009 Australian Netball League season.

=== Carina Leagues Club Tigers ===
Walker has played for and captained Carina Leagues Club Tigers in various Queensland state netball league competitions. Her teammates at Tigers have included Beryl Friday. She captained Tigers when they won the 2012 Holden Cruze Cup. She continued to captain Tigers until 2019. In 2019 the HART Sapphire Series MVP award was named the Katie Walker Medal after Walker.

== Coach ==
During the 2020 Suncorp Super Netball season, Walker served as an assistant coach to Roselee Jencke at Queensland Firebirds. In 2021 she was a specialist coach with Firebirds and head coach of Queensland Sapphires.

== Honours ==
Carina Leagues Club Tigers

- Holden Cruze Cup
  - Winners: 2012

Individual Awards

Year	Award
2006	Nance Kenny OAM Medal
2011	Holden Cruze Cup Player of the Year
