= 2015 Queensland Firebirds season =

Queensland Firebirds season

Queensland Firebirds
- 2015 season
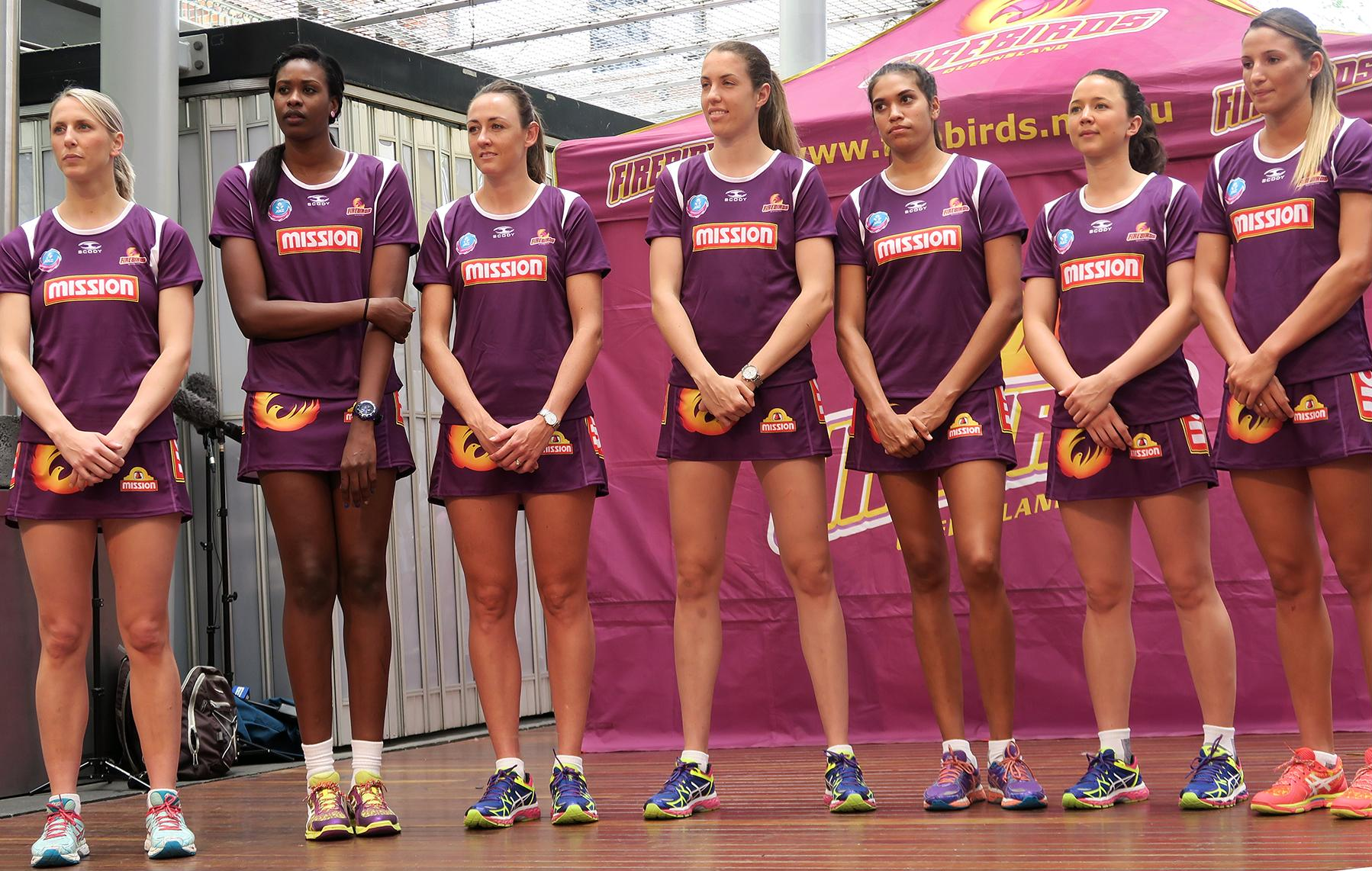
- 21 January 2015; Members of the 2015 Queensland Firebirds team. Form left to right, Clare McMeniman, Romelda Aiken, Rebecca Bulley, Laura Clemesha, Beryl Friday, Caitlyn Nevins and Kim Ravaillion.
- Head coach: Roselee Jencke
- Asst. coach: Jenny Brazel
- Manager: Nannette Rigoni
- Captain: Laura Geitz
- Vice-captain: Clare McMeniman
- Main venue: Brisbane Convention and Exhibition Centre

Season results
- Wins–losses: 14–1 (1 draw)
- Regular season: 1st (Australian Conference); Challenge Trophy holders
- Finals placing: 1st
- Team colours

Queensland Firebirds seasons
- ← 2014 2016 →

The 2015 Queensland Firebirds season saw the Queensland Firebirds netball team compete in the 2015 ANZ Championship. With a team coached by Roselee Jencke, captained by Laura Geitz and featuring Romelda Aiken, Clare McMeniman and Kim Ravaillion, Firebirds won the Australian Conference, the Challenge Trophy, the minor premiership and the overall championship. Firebirds narrowly defeated New South Wales Swifts in both the Australian Conference final and the Grand Final on their way to effectively winning four titles.

== Players ==
=== Player movements ===
Gains and losses
▲ Gains	▼ Losses
Rebecca Bulley (Adelaide Thunderbirds); Mahalia Cassidy (Queensland Fusion); Beryl Friday (Queensland Fusion); Caitlyn Nevins (Melbourne Vixens); Laura Scherian (Queensland Fusion); Gretel Tippett (New South Wales Swifts)	Demelza Fellowes (Mainland Tactix); Nicola Gray (Adelaide Thunderbirds); Jacinta Messer (Year out); Stephanie Puopolo (Victorian Fury); Ameliaranne Wells (Central Pulse)

=== 2015 roster ===
2015 Queensland Firebirds roster
Players
Coaching staff

Nat.	Name	Position(s)	DoB	Height
(Jamaica)	Romelda Aiken	GS, GA	19 November 1988 (aged 26)	1.96 m (6 ft 5 in)
(Australia)	Rebecca Bulley	GD, GK, WD	18 August 1982 (aged 32)	1.86 m (6 ft 1 in)
(Australia)	Mahalia Cassidy (TRP)	WA, C	9 October 1995 (aged 19)	1.73 m (5 ft 8 in)
(Australia)	Laura Clemesha	GK, GD	21 January 1992 (aged 23)	1.90 m (6 ft 3 in)
(Australia)	Beryl Friday	GA, GS, WA	19 January 1994 (aged 21)	1.84 m (6 ft 0 in)
(Australia)	Laura Geitz (c)	GK, GD	4 November 1987 (aged 27)	1.85 m (6 ft 1 in)
(Australia)	Clare McMeniman (vc)	GD, WD	11 July 1985 (aged 29)	1.84 m (6 ft 0 in)
(Australia)	Caitlyn Nevins	WA, C	1 June 1987 (aged 27)	1.73 m (5 ft 8 in)
(Australia)	Kim Ravaillion	C, WD, WA	26 July 1993 (aged 21)	1.75 m (5 ft 9 in)
(Australia)	Laura Scherian (TRP)	WA, C	26 June 1988 (aged 26)	1.67 m (5 ft 6 in)
(Australia)	Verity Simmons (injured)	WA, C	19 May 1991 (aged 23)	1.70 m (5 ft 7 in)
(Australia)	Gabi Simpson	WD, GD, C	17 October 1992 (aged 22)	1.76 m (5 ft 9 in)
(Australia)	Gretel Tippett	GA,GS	3 July 1993 (aged 21)	1.91 m (6 ft 3 in)
(Australia)	Amorette Wild	GA, GS, WA	10 August 1989 (aged 25)	1.78 m (5 ft 10 in)

Head coach

- (Australia) Roselee Jencke

Assistant coach

- (Australia) Jenny Brazel

Manager:
Nannette Rigoni

Notes

- (c) – Captain
- (cc) – Co-captain
- (vc) – Vice-captain
- – Injury / maternity leave
- (TRP) – Temporary Replacement Player

Notes

- ^1 Mahalia Cassidy, Laura Clemesha, Beryl Friday, Laura Scherian and Verity Simmons were all members of the 2015 Queensland Fusion squad. Jenny Brazel was the Fusion head coach.

=== Debutants ===
- Mahalia Cassidy made her ANZ Championship debut in the Round 8 match against Waikato Bay of Plenty Magic.

=== Milestones ===
- Romelda Aiken and Rebecca Bulley both made their 100th ANZ Championship appearance in the Round 1 match against West Coast Fever.
- Laura Geitz made her 100th ANZ Championship appearance in the Round 5 match against New South Wales Swifts.
- Romelda Aiken scored her 4,000 ANZ Championship goal in the Round 10 match against West Coast Fever.

=== Gold medallists ===
Rebecca Bulley, Laura Geitz and Kim Ravaillion were all members of the Australia team that won the gold medal at the 2015 Netball World Cup. Geitz also captained Australia during the tournament.

=== Constellation Cup ===
On 22 October 2015, during the second test of the 2015 Constellation Cup series against New Zealand, for the first time in the history of the Australia national netball team, five Queensland Firebirds players were on the court at the same time. The five were Laura Geitz, Clare McMeniman, Gretel Tippett, Kim Ravaillion and Gabi Simpson.

== Summer Shootout ==
Between 6 and 8 February, New South Wales Swifts hosted the Summer Shootout at Netball Central, Sydney Olympic Park. All ten ANZ Championship teams participated in the three-day tournament. A total of 25 games, consisting of both full length and shortened games consisting of two 15-minute periods, were played over the weekend. Firebirds finished the weekend with four wins and one defeat.

Fri 6 Feb	Queensland Firebirds	58–44	Mainland Tactix
6:30pm

Sat 7 Feb	Queensland Firebirds	30–17	Waikato Bay of Plenty Magic
10:00am

Sat 7 Feb	Queensland Firebirds	33–26	Southern Steel
2:30pm

Sat 7 Feb	Melbourne Vixens	26–23	Queensland Firebirds
4:30pm

Sun 8 Feb	Queensland Firebirds	46–44	Adelaide Thunderbirds
10:00am

== Regular season ==
=== Fixtures and results ===
Round 1

Sun 1 March	Queensland Firebirds	50 - 57	West Coast Fever	Brisbane Convention and Exhibition Centre
11:18 AM (AEST)	Romelda Aiken ? Amy Wild ?	Report	Caitlin Bassett 44; Natalie Medhurst ?

Round 2

Sun 8 March	Central Pulse	46 - 52	Queensland Firebirds	Te Rauparaha Arena
7:10 PM (NZDT)	Jodi Brown 27; Irene van Dyk 19	Report	Romelda Aiken 37; Amy Wild 15

Round 3

Sun 15 March	New South Wales Swifts	47 - 47	Queensland Firebirds	Sydney Olympic Park Sports Centre
12.18 PM (AEDT)	Susan Pettitt 29/37 (78%); Caitlin Thwaites 18/22 (82%)	Report	Romelda Aiken 36/46 (78%); Gretel Tippett 11/14 (79%)

Round 4

Queensland Firebirds received a bye.

Round 5

Mon 30 March	Queensland Firebirds	51 - 47	New South Wales Swifts	Brisbane Convention and Exhibition Centre
7:18 PM (AEST)	Romelda Aiken 43; Gretel Tippett ?	Report	Susan Pettitt ? Caitlin Thwaites ?

Round 6

Sun 5 April	Queensland Firebirds	48 - 46	Adelaide Thunderbirds	Brisbane Convention and Exhibition Centre
12:18 PM (AEST)	Romelda Aiken 26/32 (81%); Gretel Tippett 22	Report; Stats	Carla Borrego 30/32 (94%); Erin Bell 16	Attendance: 3,150

Round 7

Sun 12 April	Melbourne Vixens	48 - 55	Queensland Firebirds	Hisense Arena
12:18 PM (AEST)	Tegan Philip 27/30 (90%); Karyn Bailey 21/24 (88%)	Report	Romelda Aiken 37/46 (80%); Gretel Tippett 18/26 (69%)

Round 8

Sat 18 April	Queensland Firebirds	50 - 42	Waikato Bay of Plenty Magic	Brisbane Convention and Exhibition Centre
2:18 PM (AEST)	Romelda Aiken 40/49 (82%); Gretel Tippett 10/17 (59%)	Report	Joanne Harten 29/34 (85%); Ellen Halpenny 10/15 (67%); Malia Paseka 3/6 (50%)

Round 9

Sun 26 April	Northern Mystics	47 - 53	Queensland Firebirds	The Trusts Arena
7:10 PM (NZST)	Maria Tutaia 28/30 (93%); Cathrine Latu 15/15 (100%); Paula Griffin 4 ?	Report	Romelda Aiken 42/53 (79%); Gretel Tippett 11/19 (58%)

Round 10

Fri 1 May	West Coast Fever	48 - 56	Queensland Firebirds	Perth Arena
7:18 PM (AWST)	Caitlin Bassett 35/39 (90%); Natalie Medhurst 13/15 (87%)	Report	Romelda Aiken 47/57 (82%); Gretel Tippett 9/18 (50%)

Round 11

Sun 10 May	Queensland Firebirds	54 - 45	Melbourne Vixens	Gold Coast Convention and Exhibition Centre
12:18 PM (AEST)	Romelda Aiken 38/44 (86%); Gretel Tippett 16/25 (64%)	Report	Tegan Philip 21/25 (84%); Karyn Bailey 24/30 (80%)	Attendance: 4,444

Round 12

Sat 16 May	Adelaide Thunderbirds	42 - 58	Queensland Firebirds	Adelaide Arena
7:18 PM (ACST)	Carla Borrego 40; Erin Bell 18	Report	Romelda Aiken 26; Gretel Tippett 16	Attendance: 5,000

Round 13

Sun 24 May	Mainland Tactix	43 - 68	Queensland Firebirds	Marlborough Lines Stadium, Blenheim
7:10 PM (NZST)	Mwai Kumwenda 22/25 (88%); Bailey Mes 21/25 (84%)	Report	Romelda Aiken 52/67 (78%); Gretel Tippett 10/17 (59%); Amy Wild 6/9 (67%)

Round 14

Sun 31 May	Queensland Firebirds	66 - 50	Southern Steel	Brisbane Convention and Exhibition Centre
2:18 PM (AEST)	Romelda Aiken 49/60 (82%); Gretel Tippett 17/29 (59%)	Report	Jhaniele Fowler-Reid 29/36 (81%); Te Paea Selby-Rickit 17/24 (71%); Brooke Leaver 4/4 (100%)

=== Final standings ===
2015 Australian Conference
Pos	Team	Pld	W	D	L	GF	GA	G%	Pts
1	Queensland Firebirds	13	11	1	1	708	608	116.4%	23
2	New South Wales Swifts	13	8	3	2	746	665	112.2%	19
3	West Coast Fever	13	9	1	3	744	701	106.1%	19
4	Melbourne Vixens	13	7	0	6	670	657	102.0%	14
5	Adelaide Thunderbirds	13	4	2	7	667	682	97.8%	10
2015 New Zealand Conference
Pos	Team	Pld	W	D	L	GF	GA	G%	Pts
1	Northern Mystics	13	7	2	4	682	695	98.1%	16
2	Waikato Bay of Plenty Magic	13	5	1	7	643	663	97.0%	11
3	Southern Steel	13	3	2	8	759	775	97.9%	8
4	Central Pulse	13	3	2	8	620	656	94.5%	8
5	Mainland Tactix	13	1	0	12	664	801	82.9%	2

Qualified for Conference finals
Qualified for Elimination finals

- Pld = Games played
- W = Win (2 points)
- D = Draw (1 points)
- L = Loss (0 points)
- GF = Goals For
- GA = Goals Against
- G% = Goal percentage (= 100 × GF/GA)
- Pts = Points

=== Challenge Trophy ===
The 2015 season saw the introduction of the Ranfurly Shield-style, Challenge Trophy. The trophy was available to win every time the holder played at home. Once a visiting team defeats the title holders, the trophy is theirs to protect and hold against all challengers in every home game during the regular season until they are beaten. A pre-season draw saw West Coast Fever declared the inaugural holder. Fever subsequently enjoyed a nine-game unbeaten run in the league. They retained the Challenge Trophy until Round 10 when they were defeated 56–48 by Queensland Firebirds. Firebirds defended the trophy in Round 11 against Melbourne Vixens and in Round 14 against Southern Steel, finishing the season as trophy holders.

Round	Holders	Score	Challengers
Round 10	West Coast Fever	48–56	Queensland Firebirds
Round 11	Queensland Firebirds	54–45	Melbourne Vixens
Round 14	Queensland Firebirds	66–50	Southern Steel

== Finals ==
=== Conference Final ===
Sun 7 June; 12:18 PM (AEST)	Stats	Queensland Firebirds	55–44	New South Wales Swifts	Brisbane Entertainment Centre; Attendance: 5,175
Sun 7 June; 12:18 PM (AEST)	Stats	Romelda Aiken 36/39 (92%); Gretel Tippett ?		Susan Pettitt ? Caitlin Thwaites 17/21 (81%); Stephanie Wood ?	Brisbane Entertainment Centre; Attendance: 5,175

=== Semi-finals ===
Sun 14 June; 12:18 PM (AEST)	Stats	Queensland Firebirds	60–44	Northern Mystics	Brisbane Convention and Exhibition Centre; Attendance: 3,200
Sun 14 June; 12:18 PM (AEST)	Stats	Romelda Aiken 42/48 (88%); Gretel Tippett 18/27 (67%)		Maria Tutaia 24/33 (73%); Cathrine Latu 17/18 (94%); Paula Griffin 3 ?	Brisbane Convention and Exhibition Centre; Attendance: 3,200

=== Grand Final ===
Sun 21 June; 12:10 PM (AEST)	Stats	Queensland Firebirds	57–56	New South Wales Swifts	Brisbane Entertainment Centre	Fox Sports; Sky Sport
Sun 21 June; 12:10 PM (AEST)	Stats	Romelda Aiken 47/51 (92%); Gretel Tippett 10/17 (59%)		Susan Pettitt 26/28 (93%); Caitlin Thwaites 30/34 (88%)	Brisbane Entertainment Centre	Fox Sports; Sky Sport

== Award winners ==
=== Mission Queensland Firebirds Awards ===
Award	Winner
Mission Foods Player of the Year	(Jamaica) Romelda Aiken ^{(Note 1)}
Mission Foods Player of the Year	(Australia) Kim Ravaillion ^{(Note 1)}
Firebirds Players' Player	(Australia) Clare McMeniman
Firebirds Spirit Award	(Australia) Laura Clemesha
Firebirds Members Award	(Australia) Gabi Simpson

Notes

- ^1 Romelda Aiken and Kim Ravaillion shared the award.

=== ANZ Championship awards ===
Award	Winner
ANZ Championship MVP Australian Conference	(Jamaica) Romelda Aiken

=== All Star Team ===
Position	Player
C	(Australia) Kim Ravaillion

=== Australian Netball Awards ===
Award	Winner
Australian ANZ Championship Coach of the Year	Roselee Jencke

== Gallery ==
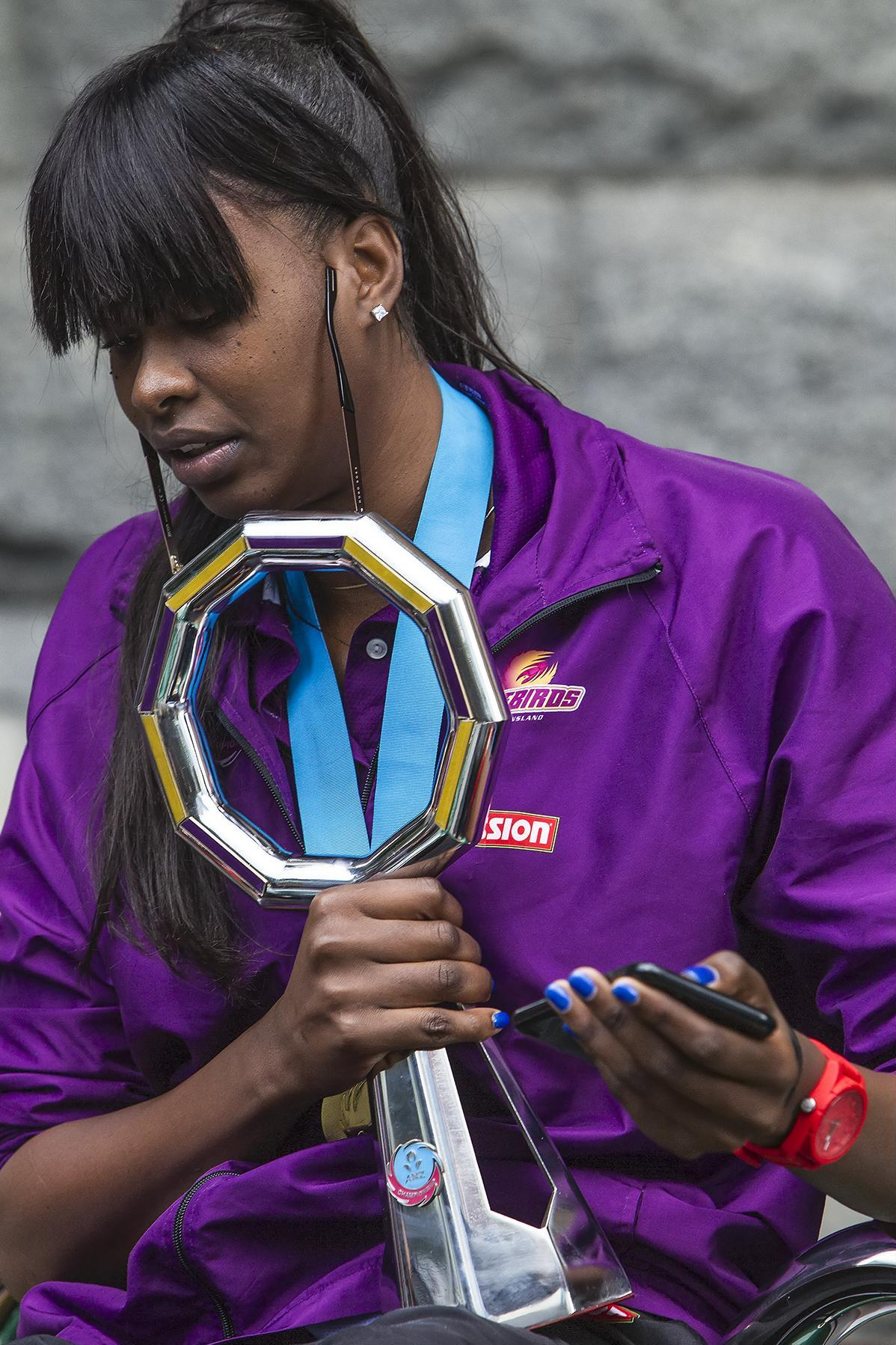
27 June 2015; Romelda Aiken with the ANZ Championship Challenge Trophy.

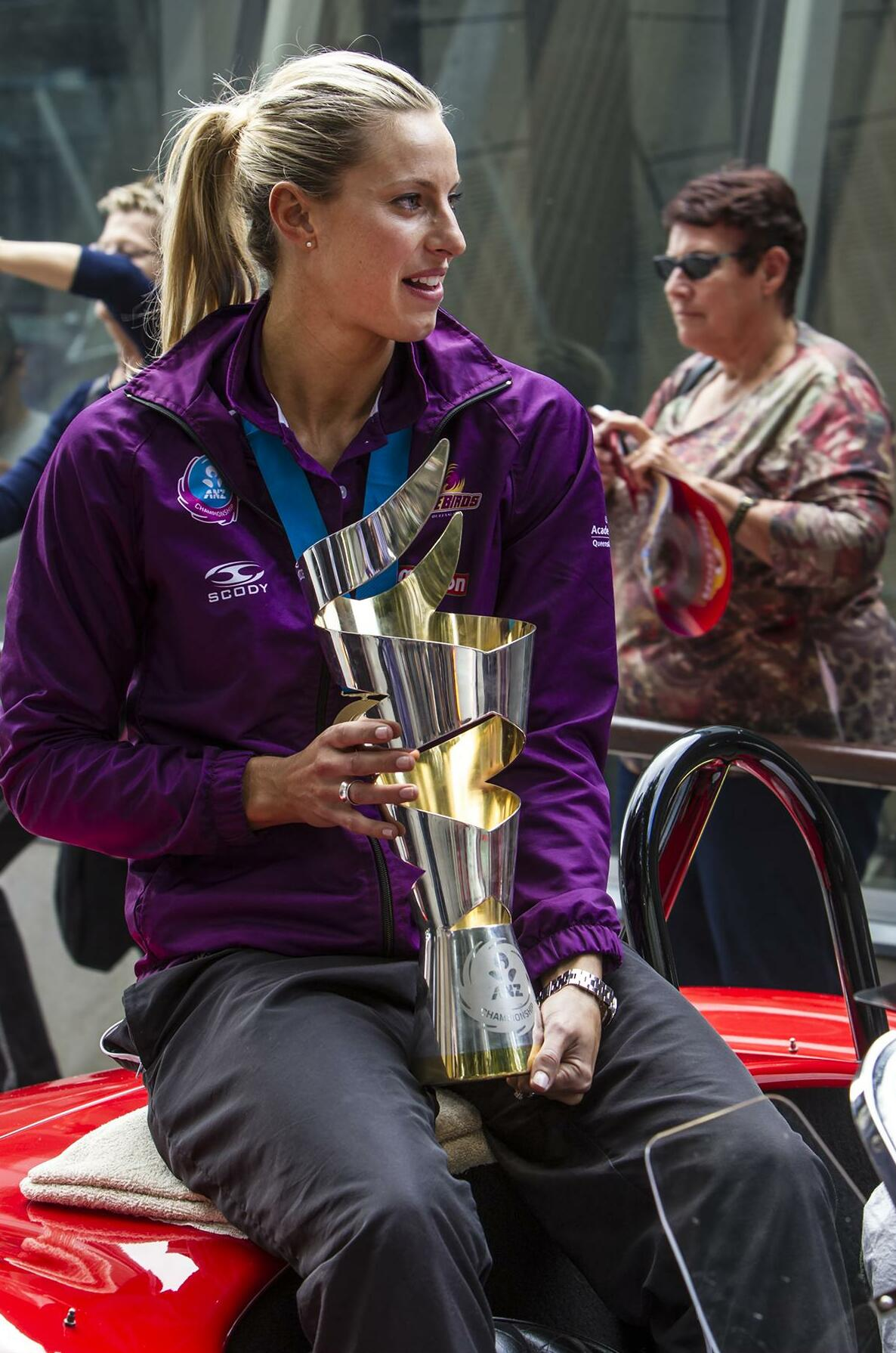
27 June 2015; Laura Geitz captained Queensland Firebirds to the 2015 ANZ Championship

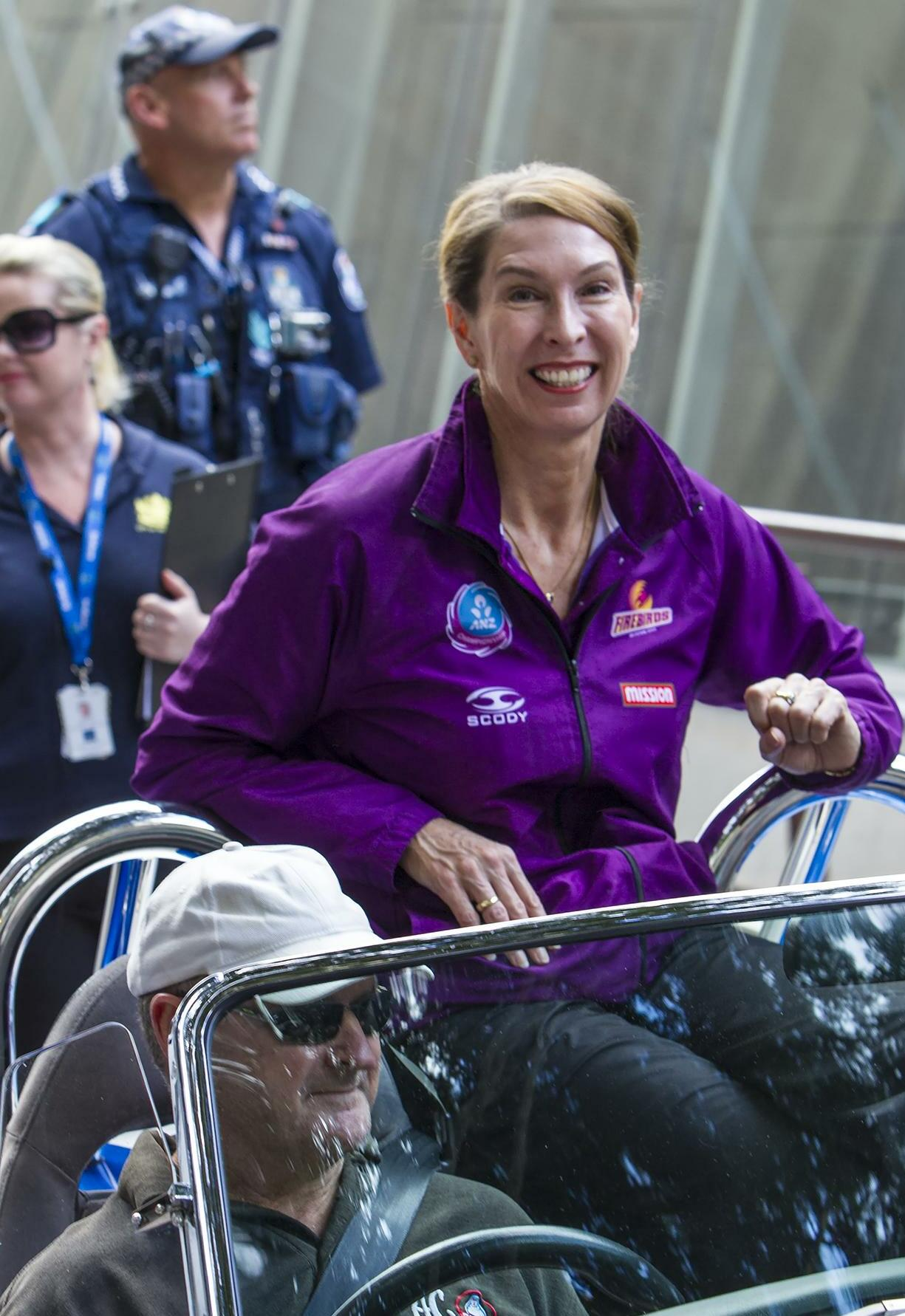
27 June 2015; Roselee Jencke guided Queensland Firebirds to the 2015 ANZ Championship
