= Carina Leagues Club Tigers =

Netball team in Queensland

- Based in: East Brisbane
- Regions: Queensland
- Head coach: Erin Byrnes
- Captain: Amy Sommerville
- League: HART Sapphire Series
- Website: Carina Leagues Club Tigers
Uniform

Carina Leagues Club Tigers, also known as CLC Tigers, are an Australian netball team based in East Brisbane. Their senior team plays in the HART Sapphire Series. They also enter teams in Netball Queensland's Ruby Series as well as under-18 and under-16 competitions. The team represents Brisbane East Netball and historically has been known as Brisbane East Tigers. They adopted their current name in 2005 after the Carina Leagues Club became the teams naming rights sponsor.

== History ==
Carina Leagues Club Tigers have competed in a series of state leagues organised by Netball Queensland, including the Holden Astra Cup, the Holden Cruze Cup, the Queensland Champions Cup and the Queensland State Netball League. In 2019, along with Bond University Bull Sharks, Brisbane North Cougars, Ipswich Jets, USC Thunder, Northern Rays and QUT Wildcats, Tigers were founding members of the HART Sapphire Series.

== Grand finals ==
=== Division 1 ===
Holden Astra Cup

Season	Winners	Score	Runners up	Venue
2008	Tigers ???		Brisbane North Kedron Wavell Cougars	Mount Gravatt

Holden Cruze Cup

Season	Winners	Score	Runners up	Venue
2011	Brisbane North Cougars	52–44	Carina Leagues Club Tigers	Logan Metro Indoor Sports Centre
2012	Carina Leagues Club Tigers	57–39	Kedron-Wavell Services Club Cougars	

Queensland Champions Cup

Season	Winners	Score	Runners up	Venue
2013	Brisbane North Cougars	66–53	Carina Leagues Club Tigers	
2014	Carina Leagues Club Tigers	56–44	Suncoast Lynx	

Mission Queensland State Netball League Division 1

Season	Winners	Score	Runners up	Venue
2015	Brisbane North Cougars		Carina Leagues Club Tigers	
2016	Brisbane North Cougars	49–43	Carina Leagues Club Tigers	
2017	Brisbane North Cougars	43–38	Carina Leagues Club Tigers	

=== Division 2 ===
Ruby Series

Season	Winners	Score	Runners up	Venue
2019	Carina Leagues Club Tigers	51–36	Ipswich Jets	
2020	Carina Leagues Club Tigers	56–48	Brisbane North Cougars	
2021	Brisbane North Cougars	58–39	Carina Leagues Club Tigers	Nissan Arena

== Notable players ==
=== Internationals ===
Australia

- Gabi Simpson
- Stephanie Wood

Scotland

- Hayley Mulheron

=== Queensland Firebirds ===
- Beryl Friday
- Abigail Latu-Meafou
- Jacqui Russell
- Gabi Simpson
- Katie Walker

=== Sunshine Coast Lightning ===
- Jacqui Russell
- Stephanie Wood

=== Captains ===
Captains	Years
Katie Walker	201x–2019
Amy Sommerville	2020–

== Premierships ==
- Division 1
  - Winners: 2008, 2012, 2014
  - Runners Up: 2011, 2013, 2015, 2016, 2017
- Division 2
  - Winners: 2019, 2020
  - Runners Up: 2021
