= Shane Walker (rugby league, born 1978) =

Australian rugby league footballer and coach

Personal information
- Born: 1 March 1978 (age 48) Toowoomba, Queensland, Australia

Playing information
- Height: 183 cm (6 ft 0 in)
- Weight: 96 kg (15 st 2 lb; 212 lb)
- Position: Hooker, Second-row
Club
Years	Team	Pld	T	G	FG	P
1996–02	Brisbane Broncos	82	5	0	0	20
2003–06	South Sydney	67	4	0	0	16
	Total	149	9	0	0	36

Coaching information
Club
Years	Team	Gms	W	D	L	W%
2011–20	Ipswich Jets
2020–	Western Clydesdales
	Total	0	0	0	0
- Spouse: Katie Walker
- Relatives: Ben Walker (brother); Chris Walker (brother); Sam Walker (nephew)

Shane Walker (born 1 March 1978) is an Australian professional rugby league coach who is the co-head coach of the Western Clydesdales in the Queensland Cup and a former professional rugby league footballer who played in the 1990s and 2000s. He played in the National Rugby League for the Brisbane Broncos and South Sydney, mostly in the position of hooker.

== Background ==
Walker was born in Toowoomba, Queensland. While attending St Mary's Christian Brothers College in 1995, Walker was selected to play for the Australian Schoolboys team.

== Playing career ==
Like his elder brother Ben and younger brother Chris, Walker started playing in the National Rugby League with the Brisbane Broncos. Having won the 2000 NRL Premiership, the Broncos traveled to England to play against 2000's Super League V Champions, St Helens R.F.C. for the 2001 World Club Challenge, with Walker playing from the interchange bench in Brisbane's loss. Walker later moved to the South Sydney club.

In 2019, Walker spoke about his time at South Sydney saying "I went to Souths because Chris was going there. I’d heard how easy it was to get mixed up with the wrong crowd in Sydney. I thought there was a fair chance he could go off the rails… so I went down to help him out. I wasted my time, didn’t I? Ten weeks later he went to the Sydney Roosters".

"I understood the significance of playing at Souths and the history. I recognised that I was lucky to wear the red and green play for Souths. You’d win a game, come up the escalators into the leagues club at Redfern and the place would be packed. The supporters would be in the auditorium and different guys would get up and talk and they’d be whipped into a frenzy. It was wonderful because in that Redfern area there are a lot of battlers. On top of that they fought like hell to get their team back in the comp. There was a lingering memory of that and the thought that perhaps their team might be taken away from them if they didn’t start winning. They were always proud of you – but they wanted a winning team to be happy about".

== Post-playing ==
Walker became co-head Coach of the Ipswich Jets who play in the Queensland Cup alongside his brother Ben.

== Family ==
Walker is married to Katie Walker, a former Australian netball player. Their first child, a daughter, Kobi, was born in November 2006.

== Sources ==
- Whiticker, Alan; Hudson, Glen (2007). The Encyclopedia of Rugby League Players. Wetherill Park, New South Wales: Gary Allen Pty Ltd. p. 609. ISBN 978-1-877082-93-1.
