= Chris Walker (rugby league) =

Australian rugby league footballer

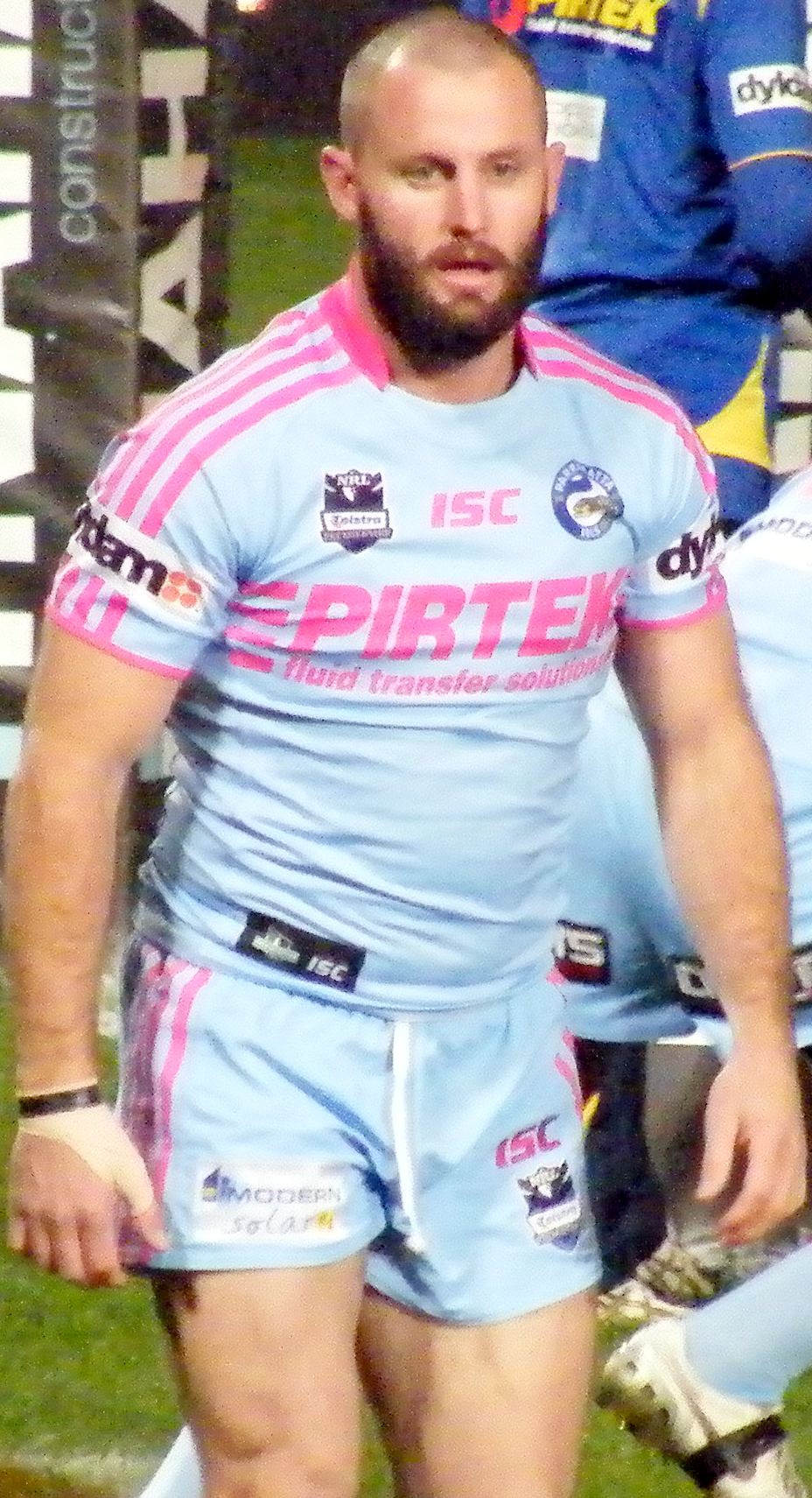

Personal information
- Born: 27 February 1980 (age 46) Brisbane, Queensland, Australia

Playing information
- Height: 183 cm (6 ft 0 in)
- Weight: 92 kg (14 st 7 lb; 203 lb)
- Position: Wing, Centre, Fullback
Club
Years	Team	Pld	T	G	FG	P
1999–02	Brisbane Broncos	67	40	0	0	160
2003	South Sydney	5	1	0	0	4
2003–05	Sydney Roosters	47	26	44	0	192
2006	Melbourne Storm	7	2	1	0	10
2007–09	Gold Coast Titans	20	10	3	0	46
2010	Catalans Dragons	12	6	2	0	28
2011	Parramatta Eels	5	2	0	0	8
	Total	163	87	50	0	448
Representative
Years	Team	Pld	T	G	FG	P
2001–02	Queensland	6	4	0	0	16
2007	Queensland Residents	1	1	0	0	4
- Relatives: Shane Walker (brother); Ben Walker (brother); Sam Walker (nephew); Katie Walker (sister-in-law)

Chris Walker (born 27 February 1980) is an Australian former professional rugby league footballer who played mostly in the 2000s. A Queensland State of Origin representative winger, he played his club football in the National Rugby League for the Brisbane Broncos, South Sydney, Sydney Roosters, Melbourne Storm, Gold Coast Titans and Parramatta. Walker also had a stint in the Super League for French club Catalans Dragons. He is the younger brother of fellow professional NRL players Shane Walker and Ben Walker. At one point in the late 1990s, all three brothers were playing together for the Brisbane Broncos.

== Background ==
Born in Brisbane, Queensland on 27 February 1980, Walker was educated St Mary's College, Toowoomba, where he represented the 1996 Australian Schoolboys.

== Playing career ==
=== Early career ===
Walker started his career playing for the Past Brothers club in the Queensland Cup.

=== Brisbane Broncos ===
While playing for Past Brothers, Walker also played for the Brisbane Broncos in the National Rugby League.

He made his first-grade debut for Brisbane against Cronulla-Sutherland in round 2 of 1999. In the 2000 NRL season, Walker played 10 games for Brisbane but did not play in their premiership-winning team in that year's grand final.

Having won the 2000 NRL Premiership, Brisbane travelled to England to play against 2000's Super League V Champions, St Helens R.F.C. for the 2001 World Club Challenge, with Walker selected for the interchange bench in Brisbane's loss.

In his final year with the club, Walker (along with Lote Tuqiri and Darren Lockyer), he was the top try-scorer for the Broncos in the 2002 season.

=== South Sydney Rabbitohs ===
After leaving Brisbane, Walker started the 2003 NRL season at South Sydney. However, he played only five games for the club before requesting a release from his contract, citing personal reasons. At the time Walker was on $350,000 salary with Souths. In 2015, Walker spoke to the media about his time at the Rabbitohs and revealed he had been sent death threats after walking out on the team by fans. Walker said, "Yes, I had about seven or eight letters. I still don't why or who sent them. The worst one was when I received a letter from someone saying they were going to shoot me. I went to the game thinking I was going to die."

=== Sydney Roosters ===
After leaving Souths mid-season, Walker joined the club's arch-rivals, the Sydney Roosters. Walker was a try-scorer in the Roosters' loss in the 2003 NRL Grand Final against Penrith.

During this period of his career, Walker gained a reputation as a "bad boy" of rugby league. In the 2004 NRL season, he was involved in a drunken altercation with police outside a Fortitude Valley nightclub, prompting the Roosters management to fine the winger and place him on an alcohol ban for the rest of the season. He returned to play on the wing and score a try for the Roosters in their 2004 NRL Grand Final loss to cross-Sydney rivals, Canterbury-Bankstown.

=== Melbourne Storm ===
After departing the Sydney Roosters following the conclusion of the 2005 NRL season, Walker signed for the Melbourne Storm. However, in August 2006, Walker was sacked by Melbourne for disciplinary reasons.

In 2019, Walker spoke about his dismissal from Melbourne, and also his departure from the Sydney Roosters, saying, "I had a bit of a disagreement with 'Sticky' [Roosters coach Ricky Stuart] at the end of 2005. I’d been getting on the drink pretty heavy and my relationship [with television actress Kate Ritchie] was falling to bits. I signed with Melbourne, and it was the same thing down there. I didn’t curb my ways off the field, and that didn’t fit in with their culture. The disagreement between [Storm coach] Craig Bellamy and myself was brought on by me being irresponsible off the field."

=== Gold Coast Titans ===
In November 2006, it was announced that Walker had been given a trial with the newly established Gold Coast Titans. In early March 2007, after a series of strong performances in pre-season trial matches for the Titans, Walker signed a one-year deal with the Gold Coast club for their inaugural season in the NRL. In club's first-ever NRL premiership game, Walker scored two tries, but then broke a bone in his hand early in the second half.

In April 2007, while sidelined with injury, Walker was reported to have been ejected from a bar for "bad behaviour". The Gold Coast Titans suspended him as a result and it was later revealed that Walker had been suffering from alcoholism and an anxiety disorder. After a period of rehabilitation and several games in the lower-tier Queensland Cup, Walker returned to the NRL in Round 19 against Canterbury.

In 2008, Walker suffered a season-ending ruptured Achilles tendon for the second time in five months, necessitating a lengthy spell on the sidelines. In 2009, he attracted interest from Super League clubs, but said he did not want to play in Europe and he would prefer to stay in the NRL with a Queensland team.

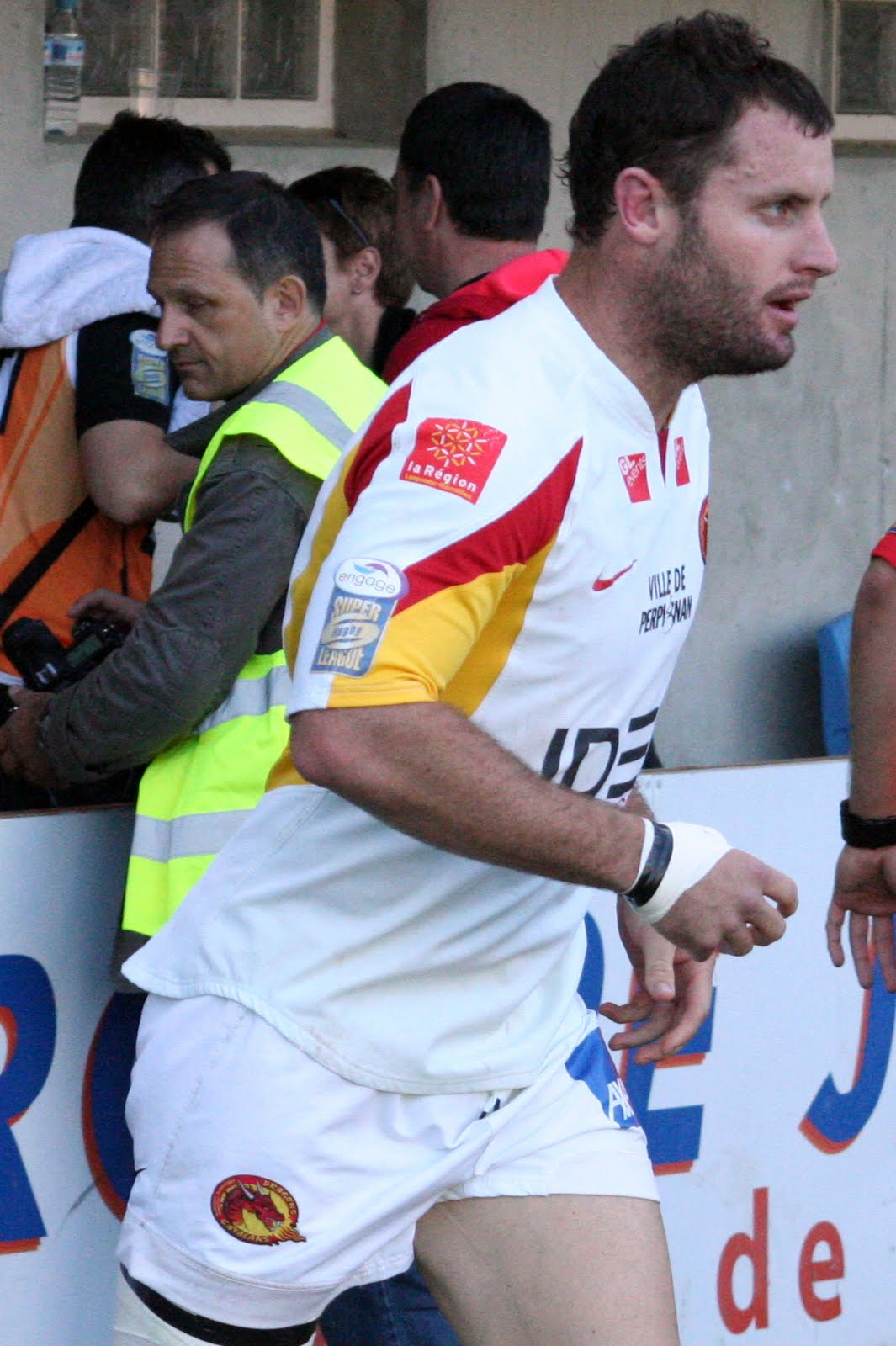
Walker playing for Catalans in 2010

=== Catalans Dragons ===
Unable to secure a desirable contract in the NRL, Walker signed a two-year deal with the Catalans Dragons in France, to commence in 2010.

=== Parramatta Eels ===
Walker spent only one season with Catalans and returned to the NRL in 2011 to play with the Parramatta Eels. However, after only six games and a string of injuries, he approached Parramatta officials for permission leave the club and retired from the NRL at the end of the 2011 season.

=== Ipswich Jets ===
Walker ultimately returned to playing, signing with Ipswich Jets in the Queensland Cup. Under the co-coaching of his brothers Ben and Shane, he played in the 2015 NRL State Championship final where Ipswich defeated Newcastle.

== Representative career ==
Walker played for Queensland in all six State of Origin matches in 2001 and 2002. Walker scored tries in all three games of the 2001 State of Origin series.
