= Brisbane North Cougars =

Netball team in Queensland

- Founded: 2001
- Based in: Brisbane
- Regions: Queensland
- Premierships: Division 1 (15); Division 2 (9)
- League: HART Sapphire Series
- Website: www.brisbanenorthcougars.com.au
Uniform

Brisbane North Cougars are an Australian netball team based in Brisbane. Their senior team plays in the HART Sapphire Series. They also enter teams in Netball Queensland's Ruby Series as well as under-18 and under-16 competitions.

== History ==
Brisbane North Cougars Netball Club was established in 2001. They represent five netball associations based in Brisbane, including the Queensland Catholic Netball Association and associations based in Downey Park, Pine Rivers and Redcliffe. They have been one of Queensland's most successful netball clubs, making regular grand final appearances and winning regular premierships. Between 2001 and 2018 they competed in a series of state leagues organised by Netball Queensland, including the Dairy Farmers Cup, the Holden Astra Cup, the Holden Cruze Cup, the Queensland Champions Cup and the Queensland State Netball League. In 2019, along with Bond University Bull Sharks, Carina Leagues Club Tigers, Ipswich Jets, USC Thunder, Northern Rays and QUT Wildcats, they were founding members of the HART Sapphire Series. Cougars were subsequently Sapphire premiers in 2020 and 2021.

== Grand finals ==
=== Division 1 ===
Dairy Farmers Cup

Season	Winners	Score	Runners up	Venue
2001	Brisbane North Cougars		Brisbane East Pumas ?	
2002	Brisbane North Cougars			
2003	Brisbane North Cougars		Brisbane West Pumas	Mount Gravatt
2004	Brisbane North Cougars			

Holden Astra Cup

Season	Winners	Score	Runners up	Venue
2005	Brisbane North Cougars			
2007	Brisbane North Cougars			
2008	??? Tigers		Brisbane North Kedron Wavell Cougars	Mount Gravatt
2009	Brisbane South Wildcats		Brisbane North Kedron Wavell Cougars	
2010	Brisbane North Cougars			

Holden Cruze Cup

Season	Winners	Score	Runners up	Venue
2011	Brisbane North Cougars	52–44	Carina Leagues Club Tigers	Logan Metro Indoor Sports Centre
2012	Carina Leagues Club Tigers	57–39	Kedron-Wavell Services Club Cougars	

Queensland Champions Cup

Season	Winners	Score	Runners up	Venue
2013	Brisbane North Cougars	66–53	Brisbane East Tigers ?	

Mission Queensland State Netball League Division 1

Season	Winners	Score	Runners up	Venue
2015	Brisbane North Cougars		Carina Leagues Club Tigers	
2016	Brisbane North Cougars	49–43	Carina Leagues Club Tigers	
2017	Brisbane North Cougars	43–38	Carina Leagues Club Tigers	
2018	Brisbane North Cougars		Goodna Services Brisbane Lions	Logan Metro Indoor Sports Centre

HART Sapphire Series

Season	Winners	Score	Runners up	Venue
2019	QUT Wildcats	60–49	Brisbane North Cougars	QSNC
2020	Brisbane North Cougars	62–47	USQ Jets	
2021	Brisbane North Cougars	70–45	QUT Netball	

=== Division 2 ===
President's Cup – Under 19

Season	Winners	Score	Runners up	Venue
2004			Brisbane North Cougars	

Ergon Energy League

Season	Winners	Score	Runners up	Venue
2005	Brisbane North Cougars			
2006			Brisbane North Cougars	
2007	Brisbane North Cougars			
2008			Brisbane North Cougars	
2009			Brisbane North Cougars	
2010	Brisbane North Cougars			

Queensland State Netball League

Season	Winners	Score	Runners up	Venue
2011	Kedron-Wavell Services Club Cougars		Logan Wildcats	
2012			Kedron-Wavell Services Club Cougars	
2013	Kedron-Wavell Services Club Cougars		Brisbane West Lions	
2014	Brisbane West Lions	53–43	Kedron-Wavell Services Club Cougars	

Queensland State Netball League Division 2

Season	Winners	Score	Runners up	Venue
2015	Brisbane North Cougars			
2016	Brisbane North Cougars			
2017	Brisbane North Cougars			

Ruby Series

Season	Winners	Score	Runners up	Venue
2020	Carina Leagues Club Tigers	56–48	Brisbane North Cougars	
2021	Brisbane North Cougars	58–39	Carina Leagues Club Tigers	Nissan Arena

== Notable players ==
=== Internationals ===
Australia

- Laura Scherian

Australia Fast5

- Tara Hinchliffe

=== Queensland Firebirds ===
- Macy Gardner
- Tara Hinchliffe

=== Sunshine Coast Lightning ===
- Tara Hinchliffe
- Laura Scherian

== Premierships ==
- Division 1
  - Winners: 2001, 2002, 2003, 2004, 2005, 2007, 2010, 2011, 2013, 2015, 2016, 2017, 2018, 2020, 2021: 15
  - Runners Up: 2008, 2012, 2019: 3
- Division 2
  - Winners:2005, 2007, 2010, 2011, 2013, 2015, 2016, 2017, 2021: 9
  - Runners Up: 2004, 2006, 2009, 2012, 2014, 2020: 6
