= Firebirds Futures =

Australian netball team

- Founded: 2008
- Based in: Brisbane
- Regions: Queensland
- Home venue: Queensland State Netball Centre
- Head coach: Katie Walker
- Asst coach: Simone Nalatu
- Manager: Ashley Naugamo
- League: Australian Netball Championships
- Website: Firebirds Futures
Uniform

The Firebirds Futures are an Australian netball team that represents Netball Queensland in the Australian Netball Championships. Between 2008 and 2019, as Queensland Fusion, they played in the Australian Netball League. From 2020 to 2022, the team was known as the Queensland Sapphires. The Firebirds Futures are effectively the reserve team of Queensland Firebirds and the representative team of the HART Sapphire Series.

== History ==
=== Queensland Fusion ===
Between 2008 and 2019, Queensland Fusion played in the Australian Netball League. They were founder members of the ANL. Their best performance in the ANL came in 2014 when they reached the grand final but lost 51–49 to Victorian Fury.

Regular season statistics

Season	Position	Won	Drawn	Lost
2008				
2009	3rd	7	0	3
2010				
2011	4th			
2012				
2013	6th			
2014				
2015				
2016				
2017				
2018				
2019				

Overall runners Up

=== Queensland Sapphires ===
In 2021, Queensland Fusion were re-branded Queensland Sapphires after the HART Sapphire Series. In September 2021, they were due to represent Netball Queensland in the inaugural Australian Netball Championships tournament. However, this tournament was cancelled due to the COVID-19 pandemic. Sapphires subsequently played in a four team series, playing against Sunshine Coast Lightning's ANC team, the Queensland Suns men's netball team and PacificAus Sports, a Pacific Islander select.

== Grand finals ==
Season	Winners	Score	Runners up	Venue
2014	Victorian Fury	51–49	Queensland Fusion	Waverley Netball Centre

== Home venue ==
During the 2019 ANL season, Queensland Fusion played their home matches at the Queensland State Netball Centre.

== Notable players ==
=== 2021 squad ===
Queensland Sapphires – 2021 Australian Netball Championships roster
Players
Coaches

Name	Pos	DOB	Height	Club	Nat	Caps
Reilley Batcheldor	GA, GS	15 April 2002 (age 23)	1.87 m (6 ft 2 in)	Brisbane North Cougars	(Australia)
Ruby Bakewell-Doran	GD, GK, WD	21 January 1999 (age 26)	1.84 m (6 ft 0 in)	Brisbane North Cougars	(Australia)
Charlie Bell			–	USQ Jets	(Australia)
Ava Black	C		–	Bond University Bull Sharks	(Australia)
Rudi Ellis	GD, GK, WD		–	Queensland Firebirds	(Australia)
Ashleigh Ervin	GD, GK		–	Bond University Bull Sharks	(Australia)
Macy Gardner	C, WA		–	Brisbane North Cougars	(Australia)
Remi Kamo	GD, GK		–	Brisbane North Cougars	(Australia)
Leesa MiMi			–	Brisbane North Cougars
Martina Reekers	GS		–	Brisbane North Cougars	(Australia)
Mia Stower	GA, WA, GS		1.82 m (6 ft 0 in)	Brisbane North Cougars	(Australia)
Hulita Veve	WD, C	14 September 1995 (age 30)	1.78 m (5 ft 10 in)	QUT Wildcats

Head coach

- Katie Walker

Assistant coach

- Simone Nalatu

Manager:
Ashley Naugamo
Physical Performance Leads:
Brynley Abad
Georgia Black
Physiotherapist: Kerry Staples
Performance Analysis:
Brandon Marangelli
Natalie Grider

Notes

- (c) – Captain
- (cc) – Co-captain
- (vc) – Vice-captain
- – Injury / maternity leave
- (TRP) – Temporary Replacement Player
Player profiles: Team website
Last updated: 29 December 2021

=== Internationals ===
Australia

- Demelza Fellowes
- Cara Koenen
- Laura Scherian
- Gretel Tippett
- Stephanie Wood

Australia Fast5

- Verity Simmons

Fiji

- Simone Nalatu

New Zealand

- Ameliaranne Wells

Papua New Guinea

- Maleta Roberts

Samoa

- Lenora Misa

=== Queensland Firebirds ===
- Mahalia Cassidy
- Laura Clemesha
- Tippah Dwan
- Demelza Fellowes
- Beryl Friday
- Macy Gardner
- Michelle Hess
- Tara Hinchliffe
- Abigail Latu-Meafou
- Amanda Lucas
- Simone Nalatu
- Jennifer O'Connor
- Meegan Rooney
- Jacqui Russell
- Laura Scherian
- Verity Simmons
- Gretel Tippett
- Katie Walker
- Ameliaranne Wells

=== Sunshine Coast Lightning ===
- Cara Koenen
- Madeline McAuliffe
- Jacqui Russell
- Laura Scherian
- Stephanie Wood

== Head coaches ==
Coach	Years
Kylee Sampson	2009
Kylee Byrne	2012, 2014
Tracey Jeanes-Fraser	2017
Jenny Brazel	2011, 2015, 2020
Katie Walker	2021

== Premierships ==
- Australian Netball League
  - Runners up: 2014: 1
