= Laura Scherian =

Australian netball player (born 1988)

Personal information
- Born: 26 June 1988 (age 38) Gisborne, Victoria
- Height: 1.67 m (5 ft 6 in)
- School: John Paul College (Brisbane)

Netball career
- Playing positions: WA, C
Years	Club team	Apps
2007	Canberra Darters	4
2010, 2015	Queensland Firebirds	8
2017–23	Sunshine Coast Lightning	107
2024	Adelaide Thunderbirds	16
Years	National team	Caps
2019	Australia	4

Laura Scherian (born 26 June 1988) is a retired Australian netball player, who played for the Sunshine Coast Lightning and Adelaide Thunderbirds in the Suncorp Super Netball league. Scherian holds the joint record for most Suncorp Super Netball premierships alongside Sophie Garbin, having won in 2017 and 2018 with the Lightning, and in 2024 with the Thunderbirds.

She grew up in the Victorian town of Gisborne where she began her junior netball. She moved to Queensland during her teenage years and finished her schooling at John Paul College in Daisy Hill.

Scherian began her netball career in the Commonwealth Bank Trophy at the now-defunct AIS Canberra Darters in 2007, before being picked up by the Queensland Firebirds in 2010 in the ANZ Championship. She was not re-signed by the Firebirds in 2011 which led her to be relegated to the second-tier Queensland Fusion team in the Australian Netball League and for the Brisbane North Cougars in the State League, where she played at for the next six years as an amateur. She would play only sporadically for the Firebirds in those years when required to replace an injured contracted player.

In 2017 she was signed as the last contracted player at the Sunshine Coast Lightning in the new Suncorp Super Netball league, the club she played at until being dropped in 2023 to make room for Liz Watson's signing. In her first match at the Lightning, Scherian was named the most valuable player as the side drew with the Firebirds in the opening match of the season. She has signed with the Lightning through to the end of the season. Scherian won titles in 2017 and 2018 with the Lightning.

In 2019, Sherian played in the winning Australian Diamonds Constellation Cup team.

In 2024, Scherian joined the Adelaide Thunderbirds winning her fourth title in 2024 for three different franchises. She retired at the conclusion of the season.
