= Kim Ravaillion =

Australia netball international (born 1993)

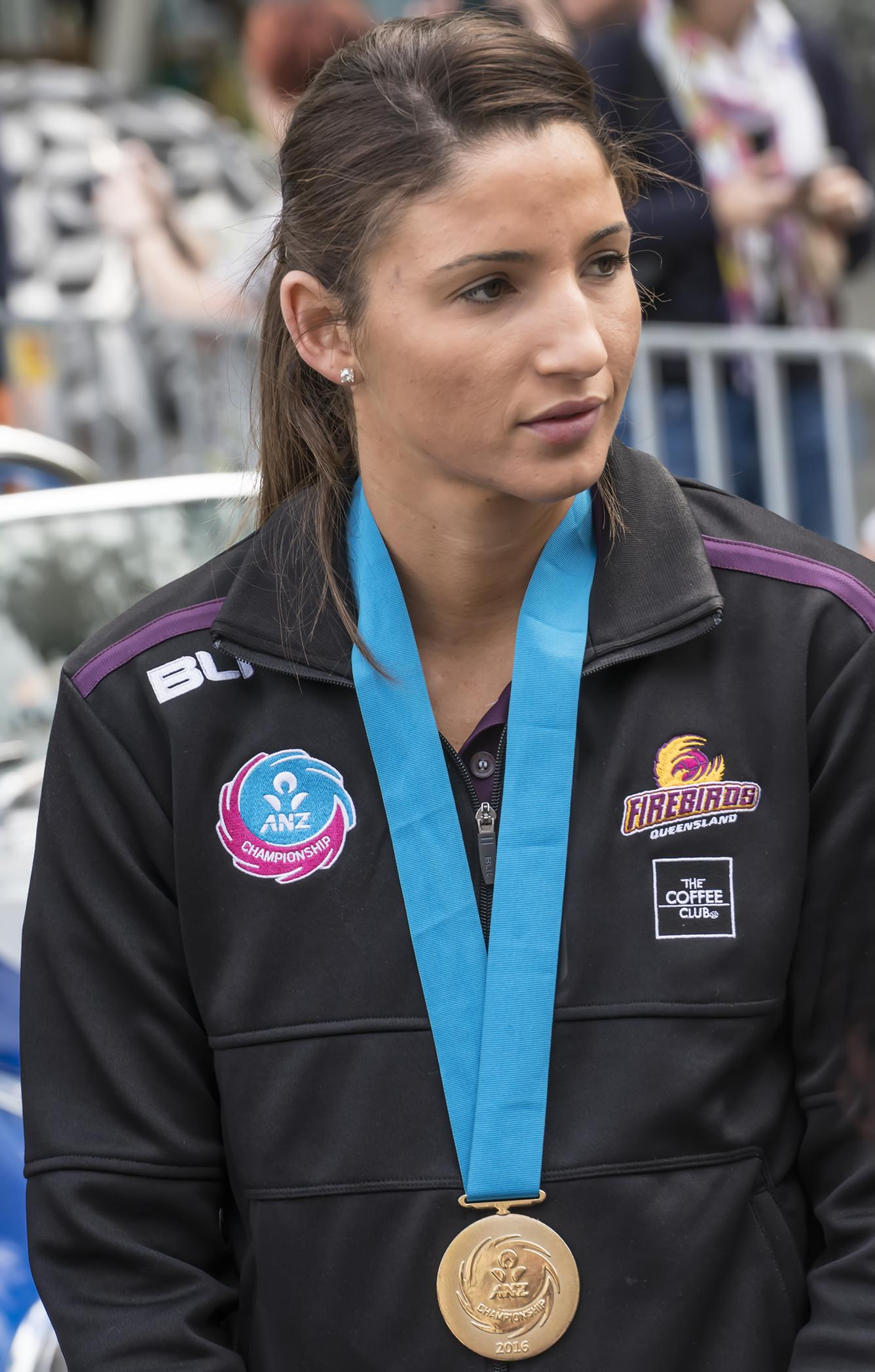
- Kim Ravaillion in August 2016

Personal information
- Full name: Kimberley Ravaillion
- Born: 26 July 1993 (age 33) Sydney, Australia
- Height: 175 cm (5 ft 9 in)
- Spouse: Adam Treloar (m. 2026)
- Children: Georgie Olive Treloar
- School: Chester Hill High School; Westfields Sports High School

Netball career
- Playing positions: C, WD, WA
Years	Club team	Apps
200x–201x	Yennora and Canley Heights Hot Shots	
2007–2010	WSAS	
2009–2010	Westfields Sports High School	
2011	NNSW Blues	
2012	Australian Institute of Sport	
2013–2016	Queensland Firebirds	
2017–2019	Collingwood Magpies	
2021–2024	Queensland Firebirds	
Years	National team	Caps
2013–2024	Australia	60
Medal record
Representing Australia
Netball World Cup
Gold medal – first place	2015 Sydney	Team
Commonwealth Games
Gold medal – first place	2014 Glasgow	Team
Silver medal – second place	2018 Gold Coast	Team

Kimberley Ravaillion (born 26 July 1993), is a retired Australia netball international. Ravaillion was a member of the Australia teams that won the gold medals at the 2014 Commonwealth Games and the 2015 Netball World Cup and the silver medal at the 2018 Commonwealth Games. In January 2013, aged 19, she made her senior debut for Australia during an away series against England. This saw Ravaillion make her senior test debut before making her top-level league debut. Her first game for Queensland Firebirds came two months later. She was subsequently a member of the Firebirds teams that won the 2015 and 2016 ANZ Championships. Between 2017 and 2019 she played for Collingwood Magpies in Suncorp Super Netball. After missing the 2020 season due to pregnancy, Ravaillion rejoined Queensland Firebirds for the 2021 season.

== Early life, education and family ==
Ravaillion is originally from the western suburbs of Sydney, (Note: Birthplace given as either Strathfield or Ashfield.) growing up in Fairfield. She is the daughter of Seena and Warren Ravaillion. She has a twin sister, Jess, and an older brother, Chris. She attended Yennora Public School and Chester Hill High School before switching to Westfields Sports High School for year 10–12 (2009–11) to become part of their netball program. Between 2007 and 2010 she also attended the Western Sydney Academy of Sport. Ravaillion is in a relationship with Adam Treloar, the Australian rules footballer. On 23 March 2020 she gave birth to the couple's first child, Georgie Olive Treloar. She has Maltese heritage.

== Playing career ==
=== Early years ===
In her youth, Ravaillion played for Yennora and Canley Heights Hot Shots in the Fairfield City District Netball Association.

=== New South Wales ===
In 2011 and 2012, Ravaillion represented New South Wales at under-19 and under-21 levels in the Australian National Netball Championships. In 2011 she was a winner with the under-19s. In 2012 she was a winner with the under-21s team and a runners up with the under-19s. She was also named the 2012 under-19 tournament MVP.

=== Australian Netball League ===
Between 2011 and 2012, Ravaillion played in the Australian Netball League. In 2011 she played for NNSW Blues and in 2012 she played for the Australian Institute of Sport.

=== Queensland Firebirds ===
2013–2016

Between 2013 and 2016, Ravaillion played for Queensland Firebirds in the ANZ Championship. Together with Abbey McCulloch and Gabi Simpson, she made her ANZ Championship and Firebirds debut in a Round 1 match against Southern Steel. Ravaillion played 15 matches for Firebirds during the 2013 season. She was a prominent member of the Firebirds teams that won the 2015 and 2016 ANZ Championships. In both 2015 and 2016 she was named in the ANZ Championship All Star team. In 2016, following MVP performances in both the Australian Conference Final and Semi-final, she was named ANZ Championship Finals Series MVP.

2021

In October 2020, after three seasons playing for Collingwood Magpies and missing the 2020 season due to pregnancy, it was announced that Ravaillion would be rejoining Queensland Firebirds for the 2021 season.

=== Collingwood Magpies ===
Between 2017 and 2019, Ravaillion played for Collingwood Magpies in Suncorp Super Netball. She was a member of the new team's very first squad. On 15 June 2019, during a Round 8 match against Sunshine Coast Lightning, Ravaillion made her 200th top level league appearance.

Magpies statistics

Season	Team	G/A	GA	RB	CPR	FD	IC	DF	PN	TO	MP
2017	Magpies	0/0	157	0	1	363	8	7	159	41	15
2018	Magpies	0/0	137	0	12	210	6	14	88	39	13
2019	Magpies	0/0	98	0	29	184	7	17	141	36	15
Career		0/0	392	0	42	757	21	38	388	116	43

Controversy

While playing for Magpies, Ravaillion began a relationship with Adam Treloar, who at the time was playing for Collingwood Football Club. After Ravaillion announced she would be rejoining Queensland Firebirds for the 2021 season, speculation began to grow about Treloar's future at Collingwood. Collingwood allegedly claimed Treloar wouldn't be able to cope if Ravaillion moved interstate. However, Ravaillion claimed that Collingwood were using her move as an excuse to offload Treloar because of his $800,000 a year contract. Treloar was subsequently traded to the Western Bulldogs for the 2021 AFL season.

=== Australia ===
In 2011 and 2012, Ravaillion represented Australia at under-19, under-21 and Fast5 levels. In January 2013, aged 19, she made her senior debut during an away series against England. She replaced injured captain, Natalie von Bertouch. This saw Ravaillion make her senior test debut before making her top level league debut. Her first game for Queensland Firebirds came two months after her test debut. Ravaillion was subsequently a member of the Australia teams that won the gold medals at the 2014 Commonwealth Games and the 2015 Netball World Cup and the silver medal at the 2018 Commonwealth Games.

Tournaments	Place
2012 Fast5 Netball World Series	6th
2013 Netball World Youth Cup	2nd place, silver medalist(s)
2014 Commonwealth Games	1st place, gold medalist(s)
2015 Netball World Cup	1st place, gold medalist(s)
2016 Netball Quad Series	1st place, gold medalist(s)
2017 Netball Quad Series (January/February)	1st place, gold medalist(s)
2017 Netball Quad Series (August/September)	2nd place, silver medalist(s)
2018 Netball Quad Series (January)	1st place, gold medalist(s)
2018 Commonwealth Games	2nd place, silver medalist(s)
2018 Netball Quad Series (September)	1st place, gold medalist(s)

== Honours ==
Australia

- Netball World Cup
  - Winners: 2015
- Commonwealth Games
  - Winners: 2014
  - Runners-up: 2018
- Netball Quad Series
  - Winners: 2016, 2017 (January/February), 2018 (September), 2018 (January)
  - Runners-up: 2017 (August/September)

Queensland Firebirds

- ANZ Championship
  - Winners: 2015, 2016
  - Runners-up: 2013, 2014

New South Wales

- Australian National Netball Championships
  - Winners: Under-19 (2011), Under-21 (2012)
  - Runners-up: Under-19 (2012)

Individual awards

Year	Award
2012	Australian National Netball Championships Under-19 MVP
2015	ANZ Championship All Star
2015	Mission Foods Queensland Firebirds Player of the Year (Note: Award shared with Romelda Aiken)
2016	ANZ Championship All Star
2016	ANZ Championship Finals Series MVP
