= Australian National Netball Championships =

Netball competitions in Australia

National Netball Championships
- Classification: Open; Under-21; Under-19; Under-17
- Founded: 1920s
- Owner: Netball Australia
- No. of teams: 8
- Country: Australia
- Most recent champions: Under-19; New South Wales; Under-17; South Australia
- Website: netball.com.au

The National Netball Championships (NNC) are a series of annual netball tournaments, organised by Netball Australia and featuring representative teams from the states and territories of Australia. The earliest tournaments took place during 1920s.

Until 2005, the championships featured an open tournament, as well tournaments for under-17, under-19 and under-21 teams. However, following the emergence of the Commonwealth Bank Trophy league, Netball Australia decided to end the open tournament. The last under-21 tournament was played in 2016.

== History ==
=== Early tournaments ===
The earliest Australian National Netball Championships took place during 1920s. Differing sources mean it is unclear exactly which year the tournament was first held. According to the 2005 Netball New South Wales annual report, New South Wales won their first title in 1926. Meanwhile, according to the Netball Victoria website, Victoria hosted and won the first official championships in 1928 in Melbourne. According to the 2004 Netball Australia annual report, the 2004 National Netball Championships were the 71st edition. However according to the 2005 annual report there had been eighty years of open competition.

== Open ==
In 2004, the open and under-21 National Netball Championships were held at Challenge Stadium in Perth, Western Australia. According to the 2004 Netball Australia annual report, they were the 71st National Netball Championships. The 2004 tournament featured several members of the Australia national netball team, including Liz Ellis, Catherine Cox, Jane Altschwager and Mo'onia Gerrard, as well as emerging players such as Natalie Medhurst, Kimberley Smith, Joanne Sutton, Johannah Curran, Susan Fuhrmann and Brooke Thompson. In 2005, Netball ACT hosted the final open championships in Canberra. Following the emergence of the Commonwealth Bank Trophy league, Netball Australia decided to end the open tournament.

=== Grand finals ===
Year	Winners	Score	Runners-up	Venue
1926	New South Wales			
1928	Victoria			Melbourne
1956	^{(Note 1)}			
1969	Western Australia			Adelaide
1970	Western Australia			Brisbane
1971	Western Australia			Hobart
1972	Western Australia			Sydney
1976	^{(Note 2)}			
1979	^{(Note 3)}			
1984	New South Wales			
1985	New South Wales			
1986	Victoria			
1987	New South Wales			
1988	New South Wales			
1989	New South Wales			
1990	New South Wales			
1991	New South Wales			Brisbane
1992	New South Wales			
1993	New South Wales	46-45	South Australia	Marrara Stadium
1994	New South Wales	41-37	South Australia	Sydney
1995				Melbourne
1996	South Australia	61-41	Victoria	Adelaide
1997	New South Wales	56-54	Victoria	Canberra (AIS)
1998				
1999	New South Wales			
2001	^{(Note 4)}			
2004	New South Wales	60–35	South Australia	Challenge Stadium
2005	New South Wales	59–57	Victoria	ACT Netball Centre, Canberra

Notes

- ^1 New South Wales, South Australia and Victoria shared the 1956 title.
- ^2 New South Wales, South Australia and Western Australia shared the 1976 title.
- ^3 New South Wales and South Australia shared the 1979 title.
- ^4 The 2001 tournament was cancelled due to the Ansett collapse

== Under-21 ==
=== Grand finals ===
Year	Winners	Score	Runners-up	Venue
1974	New South Wales			
1977	New South Wales			
1980	New South Wales			
1983	New South Wales			
1984	New South Wales			
1985	New South Wales			
1986	Victoria			
1987	New South Wales			
1988	New South Wales			
1989	New South Wales			
1990	Victoria	45-40	South Australia	
1991				Brisbane
1992
1993	New South Wales			
1994	Victoria	58-47	South Australia	Sydney
1995	South Australia	56-45	New South Wales	Waverley Netball Centre
1996	Victoria	55-45	New South Wales	
1997	South Australia	50-43	Victoria	Canberra (AIS)
1998	New South Wales			
1999				
2000				
2001	^{(Note 5)}			
2002				
2003	South Australia			
2004	South Australia	55–39	Victoria	Challenge Stadium
2005	Western Australia	60–53	South Australia	ACT Netball Centre, Canberra
2006	Victoria	71–49	Western Australia	ETSA Park
2007	Victoria	^{(Note 6)}	New South Wales	Queensland State Netball Centre
2008	New South Wales	41–40	Victoria	Perth
2009	New South Wales	43–41	Victoria	ACT Netball Centre, Canberra
2010	New South Wales	50–39	South Australia	Logan Metro Indoor Centre, Brisbane
2011	New South Wales	48–35	Victoria	Waverley Netball Centre
2012	New South Wales	49–38	South Australia	Challenge Stadium
2013	South Australia	40–36	Victoria	Canberra
2014	South Australia	43–27	Victoria	
2015	South Australia	44–42	Victoria	Caloundra Indoor Stadium, Caloundra
2016	New South Wales	49–46	Victoria	Launceston, Tasmania

=== Tournament MVP ===
Year	Winner	Team
2010	April Letton ^{(Note 7)}	New South Wales
2010	Chanel Gomes ^{(Note 7)}	Queensland
2011	April Letton	New South Wales
2012	Courtney Bruce	Western Australia
2013		
2014		
2015		
2016	Maddy Turner	New South Wales

Notes

- ^5 The 2001 tournament was cancelled due to the Ansett collapse
- ^6 The 2007 Netball Australia Annual Report gives the final score as 61–36 while the 2007 Netball NSW Annual Report gives it as 36–21.
- ^7 April Letton and Chanel Gomes shared the 2010 Under-21 Tournament MVP award.

== Under-19 ==
=== Grand finals ===
Year	Winners	Score	Runners-up	Venue
1985	Western Australia			
1986	South Australia			
1987	Western Australia			
1988	New South Wales			
1989	South Australia			
1990	Victoria			
1991	Victoria			
1992	New South Wales			
1993	Victoria			
1994	New South Wales			
1995	New South Wales			
1996	South Australia			
1997	South Australia			
1998	South Australia			
1999	New South Wales			
2000	Queensland			
2001	Victoria	28–27	New South Wales	ACT Netball Centre, Canberra
2002	New South Wales			
2003	Victoria			
2004	Victoria	37–22	South Australia	Silverdome
2005	Victoria	36–19	Queensland	Marrara Stadium
2006	Victoria	37–26	New South Wales	Penrith Stadium
2007	Victoria	32–22	South Australia	State Netball Hockey Centre
2008	New South Wales	19–14	Victoria	Perth
2009	New South Wales	39–30	Queensland	ACT Netball Centre, Canberra
2010	Queensland	27–24	New South Wales	ETSA Park
2011	New South Wales	36–21	Victoria	Logan Metro Indoor Sports Centre
2012	Victoria	27–19	New South Wales	Silverdome
2013	South Australia			Canberra
2014	Queensland	38–28	Victoria	Waverley Netball Centre, VIC
2015	New South Wales	43–39	Victoria	Netball Central
2016	Victoria	31–27	New South Wales	Perth
2017	Victoria			Canberra
2018	Victoria	31–26	South Australia	Priceline Stadium
2019	South Australia	49–20	New South Wales	Queensland State Netball Centre
2020	^{(Note 8)}			
2021	^{(Note 8)}			
2022	New South Wales	26-24	South Australia	Hobart Netball and Sports Centre
2023	South Australia	44-33	Western Australia	Marrara Stadium
2024	New South Wales	42-32	Queensland	Jubilee Park Stadium, Frankston VIC
2025	New South Wales	35-28	Victoria	Netball Central
2026	New South Wales	39-29	South Australia	State Netball Hockey Centre

=== Tournament MVP ===
Year	Winner	Team
2010	Stephanie Wood	Queensland
2011	Gabi Simpson	New South Wales
2012	Kim Ravaillion	New South Wales
2013	Georgie Virgo	Queensland
2014	Cara Koenen	Queensland
2015	Toni Anderson	New South Wales
2016	Sasha Glasgow	South Australia
2017	Tara Hinchliffe	Queensland
2018	Olivia Lewis	Western Australia
2019	Macy Gardner	Queensland
2020	^{(Note 8)}	
2021	^{(Note 8)}	
2022	Kayla Graham	South Australia
2023	Lucy Voyvodic	South Australia
2024	Frederika Schneideman	New South Wales
2025	Tia Molo	Queensland
2026	Jazmin McKay	South Australia

== Under-17 ==
=== Grand finals ===
Year	Winners	Score	Runners-up	Venue
1983	Queensland			
1984				
1985	New South Wales			
1986	New South Wales			
1987	South Australia			
1988	South Australia	35-25	New South Wales	Sydney
1989	New South Wales			
1990	New South Wales			
1991	South Australia			
1992	Victoria			
1993	New South Wales			
1994	New South Wales			
1995	New South Wales			
1996	South Australia			
1997	South Australia			
1998	Victoria			
1999	New South Wales			
2000	New South Wales			
2001	Queensland	40–21	New South Wales	ACT Netball Centre, Canberra
2002	Victoria			
2003	Victoria			
2004	Victoria	34–19	New South Wales	Silverdome
2005	New South Wales	32–23	South Australia	Marrara Stadium
2006	New South Wales	31–23	Victoria	Penrith Stadium
2007	New South Wales	21–15	Victoria	State Netball Hockey Centre
2008	Victoria	20–19	New South Wales	Perth
2009	South Australia	23–21	Victoria	ACT Netball Centre, Canberra
2010	Victoria	24–23	New South Wales	ETSA Park
2011	Victoria	33–31	New South Wales	Logan Metro Indoor Sports Centre
2012	New South Wales	38–28	Victoria	Silverdome
2013	Victoria	35–22	Western Australia	Darwin
2014	Victoria	29–25	New South Wales	Waverly Netball Centre
2015	Queensland	27–24	New South Wales	Netball Central
2016	South Australia	29–24	New South Wales	Perth
2017	South Australia	26–25	Victoria	Canberra
2018	South Australia	40–26	Victoria	Priceline Stadium
2019	South Australia	35–30	New South Wales	Queensland State Netball Centre
2020	^{(Note 8)}			
2021	^{(Note 8)}			
2022	New South Wales	38-35	Victoria	Hobart Netball and Sports Centre
2023	Queensland	42-40	New South Wales	Marrara Stadium
2024	South Australia	30-28	Western Australia	Jubilee Park Stadium, Frankston VIC
2025	South Australia	33-26	New South Wales	Netball Central
2026	South Australia	42-41	New South Wales	State Netball Hockey Centre

=== Tournament MVP ===
Year	Winner	Team
2010	Kate Moloney	Victoria
2011	Charlotte Goodman	Queensland
2012	Kaitlyn Bryce	New South Wales
2013	Alice Teague-Neeld	Victoria
2014	Hannah Petty	South Australia
2015	Kim Jenner	Queensland
2016	Olivia Lewis	Western Australia
2017	Sunday Aryang	Western Australia
2018	Molly Watson	South Australia
2019	Kimberley Hearnden	South Australia
2020	^{(Note 8)}	
2021	^{(Note 8)}	
2022	Grace Whyte (joint)	New South Wales
"	Tabitha Packer (joint)	South Australia
2023	Nicola Barge	New South Wales
2024	Jemma Kelly	South Australia
2025	Jazmin McKay (joint)	South Australia
"	Sophie Sherriff (joint)	Tasmania
2026	Ruby Stanford	Queensland

Notes

- ^8 The 2020 and 2021 tournaments were cancelled due to the COVID-19 pandemic in Australia.

== Main sponsors ==
	Years
The Athlete's Foot	200?–2008
DealsDirect	2010
