= Sapphire Series =

Netball league in Queensland

- Sport: Netball
- Founded: 2019
- Owner: Netball Queensland
- No. of teams: 10 (2022)
- Country: Australia
- Venue: Queensland State Netball Centre
- Most recent champion: Brisbane North Cougars (2021)
- Most titles: Brisbane North Cougars (2 titles)
- Sponsor: Hart Sport
- Level on pyramid: 3
- Website: Sapphire Series

The Sapphire Series (also known as the Hart Sapphire Series under naming rights) is a state netball league featuring teams from Queensland. The league is organised by Netball Queensland. The current semi-professional league was first played for during the 2019 season. It replaced earlier state leagues organised by Netball Queensland as the top level netball competition in Queensland. On a national level, the HART Sapphire Series is effectively a third level league. Reserve teams compete in the Ruby Series. The Firebirds Futures are the representative team of the Sapphire Series. They originally played as Queensland Fusion, and then in 2021 were re-branded Queensland Sapphires after the Sapphire Series.

== History ==
=== Earlier state leagues ===
Between 2001 and 2018, Netball Queensland organised a series of state leagues. These included the Dairy Farmers Cup, the Holden Astra Cup, the Holden Cruze Cup, the Queensland Champions Cup and the Queensland State Netball League.

=== 2019 ===
In 2019 the founding members of the Sapphire Series included Bond University Bull Sharks, Brisbane North Cougars, Carina Leagues Club Tigers, Ipswich Jets, Moreton Bay/USC Thunder, Northern Rays and QUT Wildcats. The inaugural season began on 25 June 2019, with a match which saw Thunder defeat Bull Sharks 53–44. QUT Wildcats were the inaugural premiers after defeating Cougars 60–49 in the grand final.

=== 2020 ===
Due to the COVID-19 pandemic, the 2020 season took place later then planned. Northern Rays were unable to compete due to travel restrictions, so the second season went ahead with six teams in the Sapphire Series. Cougars, Jets, Wildcats, Tigers, Bullsharks and Thunder also entered the Ruby Series were they joined by a seventh team, Darling Downs Panthers. Cougars finished the season as premiers after defeating Jets 62–47 in the grand final.

=== 2021 ===
The 2021 Sapphire Series featured eight teams with the return of Northern Rays and the debut of QUT Netball. Brisbane North Cougars finished the season as premiers after defeating QUT Netball 70–45 in the grand final.

=== 2022 ===
In December 2021 it was announced that Gold Coast Titans would enter a team in the 2022 Sapphire Series.

== Teams ==
Team	Colours	Location	Debut season	Championships	
Team	Colours	Location	Debut season	Total	Years
Bond University Bull Sharks		Bond University	2019	1	2025
Brisbane North Cougars		North Brisbane	2019	5	2020, 2021, 2022, 2023, 2026
Brisbane South Wildcats		South Brisbane	2019	0	-
Carina Leagues Club Tigers		East Brisbane	2019	0	-
Darling Downs Panthers		Toowoomba	2020	0	-
Gold Coast Titans		Gold Coast	2022	0	-
Ipswich Jets		Ipswich	2019	1	2024
Moreton Bay Pulse		Moreton Bay	2025	0	-
Redlands Coast Eagles		Redland	2024	0	-
USC Thunder		Sunshine Coast	2019	0	-

Team	Home venue/base	Home city/town/suburb	Debut season
Bond University Bull Sharks		Bond University	2019
Brisbane North Cougars		North Brisbane	2019
Brisbane South Wildcats	Nissan Arena	South Brisbane	2019
Carina Leagues Club Tigers		East Brisbane	2019
Darling Downs Panthers	Downlands College	Toowoomba	2020
Gold Coast Titans		Gold Coast, Queensland	2022
Northern Mendi Rays	Townsville Stadium	Townsville	2019
QUT Netball	Nissan Arena	Queensland University of Technology	2021
USC Thunder	USC Stadium	University of the Sunshine Coast	2019
USQ Jets Netball Club		Ipswich, Queensland	2019

Notes

- ^1 Brisbane South Wildcats were originally partnered with Queensland University of Technology and were known as QUT Wildcats.
- ^2 Darling Downs Panthers only play in the Ruby Series.
- ^3 Gold Coast Titans are the netball team of Gold Coast Titans
- ^4 USC Thunder were originally known as Moreton Bay Thunder. They are partnered with both the University of the Sunshine Coast and Sunshine Coast Lightning.
- ^5 USQ Jets Netball Club were originally known as Ipswich Jets. They are partnered with both the University of Southern Queensland and Ipswich Jets.

== Venues ==
The majority of Sapphire Series matches are played at the Queensland State Netball Centre. Northern Rays play their home games in North Queensland, while the remaining teams can play two home games in their own venue each season.

== Representative team ==
Queensland Sapphires are the representative team of the HART Sapphire Series. They originally played as Queensland Fusion. In 2021 they were re-branded Queensland Sapphires after the Sapphire Series.

== Division 1 grand finals ==
Dairy Farmers Cup

Season	Winners	Score	Runners up	Venue
2001	Brisbane North Cougars		Brisbane East Pumas ?	
2002	Brisbane North Cougars			
2003	Brisbane North Cougars		Brisbane West Pumas	Mount Gravatt
2004	Brisbane North Cougars			

Holden Astra Cup

Season	Winners	Score	Runners up	Venue
2005	Brisbane North Cougars			
2006				
2007	Brisbane North Cougars			
2008	??? Tigers		Brisbane North Kedron Wavell Cougars	Mount Gravatt
2009	Brisbane South Wildcats		Brisbane North Kedron Wavell Cougars	
2010	Brisbane North Cougars			

Holden Cruze Cup

Season	Winners	Score	Runners up	Venue
2011	Brisbane North Cougars	52–44	Carina Leagues Club Tigers	Logan Metro Indoor Sports Centre
2012	Carina Leagues Club Tigers	57–39	Kedron-Wavell Services Club Cougars	

Queensland Champions Cup

Season	Winners	Score	Runners up	Venue
2013	Brisbane North Cougars	66–53	Carina Leagues Club Tigers	
2014	Carina Leagues Club Tigers	56–44	Suncoast Lynx	

Queensland State Netball League Division 1

Season	Winners	Score	Runners up	Venue
2015	Brisbane North Cougars		Carina Leagues Club Tigers	
2016	Brisbane North Cougars	49–43	Carina Leagues Club Tigers	
2017	Brisbane North Cougars	43–38	Carina Leagues Club Tigers	
2018	Brisbane North Cougars		Goodna Services Brisbane Lions	Logan Metro Indoor Sports Centre

Sapphire Series

Season	Winners	Score	Runners up	Venue
2019	QUT Wildcats	60–49	Brisbane North Cougars	QSNC
2020	Brisbane North Cougars	62–47	USQ Jets	
2021	Brisbane North Cougars	70–45	QUT Netball	
2022	ACU Brisbane North Cougars			
2023	ACU Brisbane North Cougars			
2024	Ipswich Jets		Gold Coast Titans	
2025	Bond University Bull Sharks			
2026	Brisbane North Cougars			

== Awards ==
Katie Walker Medal

The Sapphire Series MVP award is named after Katie Walker.

Season	Winner	Team
2019	Hulita Veve	QUT Wildcats
2020	Ava Black	Bond University Bull Sharks
2021	Leesa Mi Mi	Brisbane North Cougars

Sapphire Series Grand Final MVP

Season	Winner	Team
2019	Dannielle Taylor	QUT Wildcats
2020	Ruby Bakewell-Doran	Brisbane North Cougars
2021		

== Ruby Series ==
=== Grand finals ===
Season	Winners	Score	Runners up	Venue
2019	Carina Leagues Club Tigers	51–36	Ipswich Jets	
2020	Carina Leagues Club Tigers	56–48	Brisbane North Cougars	
2021	Brisbane North Cougars	58–39	Carina Leagues Club Tigers	Nissan Arena

=== Awards ===
Ruby Series Season MVP

Season	Winner	Team
2019	Martina Reekers	
2020	Naomi Solomona	Ipswich Jets
2021		

Ruby Series Grand Final MVP

Season	Winner	Team
2019	Shelley Rosanoff	Carina Leagues Club Tigers
2020	Reilley Batcheldor	Carina Leagues Club Tigers
2021	Monique Piuniti	Brisbane North Cougars

== Main sponsors ==
	Years
Hart Sport	2019–
