= Netball Queensland =

Netball governing body

- Jurisdiction: Queensland
- Membership: 100,000
- Abbreviation: NQ
- Founded: 1920s
- Affiliation: Netball Australia
- Headquarters: Nissan Arena
- Location: 590 Mains Road; Nathan, Queensland
- CEO: Kate Davies

Official website
- qld.netball.com.au

Netball Queensland is the governing body for netball in Queensland. It is affiliated to Netball Australia. It is responsible for organizing and managing Queensland Firebirds who compete in Suncorp Super Netball. It is also responsible for organizing and managing the HART Sapphire Series as well as numerous other leagues and competitions for junior and youth teams. Its headquarters are based at the Nissan Arena.

== History ==
In 1927, an early incarnation of Netball Queensland, the Australian Ladies Basket Ball Association was a founder member of Netball Australia.

Since 2019, Netball Queensland's headquarters have been based at the Nissan Arena.

== Representative teams ==
=== Current ===
Team	Leagues	Years
Queensland Firebirds	Suncorp Super Netball; ANZ Championship; Commonwealth Bank Trophy	1997–
Queensland Sapphires	Australian Netball Championships	2021–
Under-19, Under-17	Australian National Netball Championships	
Queensland Suns	Men's netball	

=== Former ===
Team	Leagues	Years
Queensland Fusion	Australian Netball League	2008–2019

== Competitions ==
- HART Sapphire Series
- Ruby Series
- 16U and 18U State Titles
- Senior State Age
- Junior State Age
- Vicki Wilson Championship and Boys Open
- Primary Schools Cup

== Chief Executive Officers ==
Years	CEO
2015–2021	Catherine Clark
2021–	Kate Davies
