= 2014 ANZ Championship season =

Netball league season

- League: ANZ Championship
- Sport: Netball
- Duration: 1 March – 22 June
- Teams: 10
- TV partner(s): Fox Sports (Australia); Sky Sport (New Zealand); SBS 2 Te Reo; NITV
- Champions: Melbourne Vixens
- Runners-up: Queensland Firebirds
- Minor premiers: Melbourne Vixens
- Season MVP: Kimberlee Green (Swifts); Joanne Harten (Magic)
- Top scorer: Mwai Kumwenda (Tactix)

ANZ Championship seasons
- ← 2013 2015 →

The 2014 ANZ Championship season was the seventh season of the ANZ Championship. The 2014 season began on 1 March and concluded on 22 June. With a team coached by Simone McKinnis, captained by Bianca Chatfield and also featuring Tegan Caldwell, Geva Mentor, Madison Robinson and Catherine Cox, Melbourne Vixens won both the minor premiership and the overall championship. Vixens defeated Queensland Firebirds in both the major semi-final and the grand final as they won their second premiership. They won their first in 2009.

== Transfers ==
Player	2013 team	2014 team
(Australia) Andrea Gilmore	West Coast Fever	Adelaide Thunderbirds
(Australia) Wendy Jacobsen	Boroondara Genesis	Adelaide Thunderbirds
(Australia) Cody Lange	Australian Institute of Sport	Adelaide Thunderbirds
(Australia) Maddy Proud	Australian Institute of Sport	Adelaide Thunderbirds
(Australia) Catherine Cox	West Coast Fever	Melbourne Vixens
(Australia) Caitlyn Strachan	Victorian Fury	Melbourne Vixens
(Australia) Elizabeth Watson	Victorian Flames	Melbourne Vixens
(Australia) Joanna Weston	Australian Institute of Sport	Melbourne Vixens
(Australia) Taylah Davies	NNSW Waratahs	New South Wales Swifts
(Australia) Maddie Hay	NNSW Blues	New South Wales Swifts
(Australia) Sharni Layton	Adelaide Thunderbirds	New South Wales Swifts
(Australia) Abbey McCulloch	Queensland Firebirds	New South Wales Swifts
(Australia) Gretel Tippett	Queensland Firebirds	New South Wales Swifts
(Australia) Caitlin Thwaites	Central Pulse	New South Wales Swifts
(Australia) Sarah Wall	^{(Note 1)}	New South Wales Swifts
(Australia) Micaela Wilson	Melbourne Vixens	New South Wales Swifts
(Australia) Verity Simmons	West Coast Fever	Queensland Firebirds
(Australia) Amorette Wild	New South Wales Swifts	Queensland Firebirds
(Australia) Natalie Medhurst	Queensland Firebirds	West Coast Fever
(Australia) Chelsea Pitman	Queensland Firebirds	West Coast Fever
(England) Ama Agbeze	Territory Storm	Central Pulse
(New Zealand) Irene van Dyk	Waikato Bay of Plenty Magic	Central Pulse
(New Zealand) Laura Langman	Waikato Bay of Plenty Magic	Northern Mystics
(Malawi) Mwai Kumwenda	Victorian Fury	Mainland Tactix
(New Zealand) Jessica Moulds	Northern Mystics	Mainland Tactix
(New Zealand) Hayley Saunders	Northern Mystics	Mainland Tactix
(New Zealand) Erena Mikaere	Waikato Bay of Plenty Magic	Southern Steel
(New Zealand) Courtney Tairi	Southern Steel	Waikato Bay of Plenty Magic
(New Zealand) Elizabeth Manu	^{(Note 2)}	Waikato Bay of Plenty Magic

Notes

- ^1 Sarah Wall previously played for Melbourne Vixens and Queensland Firebirds.
- ^2 Elizabeth Manu previously played for Canterbury Tactix and Central Pulse.

== Head coaches and captains ==
Team	Head coach	Captain
Adelaide Thunderbirds	Jane Woodlands-Thompson	Renae Hallinan
Melbourne Vixens	Simone McKinnis	Bianca Chatfield
New South Wales Swifts	Robert Wright	Kimberlee Green
Queensland Firebirds	Roselee Jencke	Laura Geitz
West Coast Fever	Norma Plummer	Natalie Medhurst
Central Pulse	Robyn Broughton	Katrina Grant
Mainland Tactix	Leigh Gibbs	Anna Thompson
Northern Mystics	Debbie Fuller	Maria Tutaia
Southern Steel	Janine Southby	Jodi Brown
Waikato Bay of Plenty Magic	Julie Fitzgerald	Casey Kopua

== Regular season ==
=== Round 1 ===
Saturday 1 March	Mainland Tactix	46 – 70	Waikato Bay of Plenty Magic	CBS Canterbury Arena
4:20pm	Mwai Kumwenda 29/30 (97%); Julianna Naoupu 5/7 (71%); Sophia Fenwick 12/20 (60%)	Report; Stats	Joanne Harten 41/42 (98%); Ellen Halpenny 29/32 (91%)

Sunday 2 March	New South Wales Swifts	54 – 51	West Coast Fever	Sydney Olympic Park Sports Centre
12:18pm	Susan Pratley 30/33 (91%); Caitlin Thwaites 24/28 (86%)	Report	Caitlin Bassett 42/50 (84%); Natalie Medhurst 9/12 (75%)

Sunday 2 March	Melbourne Vixens	58 – 34	Northern Mystics	Hisense Arena
2:18pm	Tegan Caldwell 21/28 (75%); Karyn Bailey 28/33 (85%); Catherine Cox 9/14 (64%)	Report; Stats	Maria Tutaia 16/27 (59%); Cathrine Latu 15/20 (75%); Bailey Mes 3/10 (30%)

Sunday 2 March	Southern Steel	44 – 60	Queensland Firebirds	Stadium Southland Velodrome
7:20pm	Jodi Brown 11/17 (65%); Jhaniele Fowler-Reid 20/22 (91%); Te Paea Selby-Rickit 13/16 (81%)	Report	Romelda Aiken 35/44 (80%); Amy Wild 25/31 (81%)

Monday 3 March	Central Pulse	44 – 45	Adelaide Thunderbirds	TSB Bank Arena
7:40pm	Donna Wilkins 25/28 (89%); Irene van Dyk 19/23 (83%)	Report	Carla Borrego 32/37 (86%); Erin Bell 13/17 (76%)

=== Round 2 ===
Saturday 8 March	Central Pulse	67 – 56	Southern Steel	TSB Bank Arena
4:20pm	Donna Wilkins 28/29 (97%); Irene van Dyk 39/41 (95%)	Report; Stats	Jodi Brown 15/19 (79%); Jhaniele Fowler-Reid 41/44 (93%)

Sunday 9 March	West Coast Fever	56 – 65	Melbourne Vixens	Challenge Stadium
9:18am	Caitlin Bassett 16/19 (84%); Natalie Medhurst 28/31 (90%); Kate Beveridge ?	Report; Stats	Tegan Caldwell 25/28 (89%); Karyn Bailey 35/42 (83%)

Sunday 9 March	Queensland Firebirds	48 – 55	Adelaide Thunderbirds	Brisbane Convention & Exhibition Centre
1:18am	Romelda Aiken ? Amy Wild 18; Ameliaranne Wells ?	Report; Stats	Carla Borrego 29; Erin Bell 26/31 (84%) ? ?

Sunday 9 March	Mainland Tactix	57 – 68	New South Wales Swifts	CBS Canterbury Arena
7:20pm	Mwai Kumwenda 46/49 (94%); Sophia Fenwick 11/22 (50%)	Report	Caitlin Thwaites 24/26 (92%); Carla Dziwoki 15/18 (83%); Susan Pratley 29/35 (83%)

Monday 10 March	Northern Mystics	36 – 50	Waikato Bay of Plenty Magic	The Trusts Arena
7:40pm	Maria Tutaia 13/22 (59%); Cathrine Latu 8/11 (73%); Bailey Mes 15/23 (65%)	Report	Joanne Harten 30/31 (97%); Ellen Halpenny 20/27 (74%)

=== Round 3 ===
Sunday 16 March	West Coast Fever	79 – 43	Mainland Tactix	Challenge Stadium
11:18am	Caitlin Bassett 57/63 (90%); Natalie Medhurst 22/28 (79%)	Report; Stats	Mwai Kumwenda 19/21 (90%); Julianna Naoupu 18/28 (64%); Sophia Fenwick 6/10 (60%)

Sunday 16 March	Melbourne Vixens	47 – 48	Queensland Firebirds	Hisense Arena
12:18pm	Tegan Caldwell 18/22 (82%); Karyn Bailey 29/37 (78%)	Report; Stats	Romelda Aiken 38/46 (83%); Amy Wild 10/16 (63%)

Sunday 16 March	Northern Mystics	47 – 53	Central Pulse	The Trusts Arena
7:20pm	Maria Tutaia 17/24 (71%); Cathrine Latu 30/31 (97%)	Report; Stats	Donna Wilkins 28/31 (90%); Irene van Dyk 25/28 (89%)

Monday 17 March	Adelaide Thunderbirds	50 – 49	New South Wales Swifts	Netball SA Stadium
7:18pm	Carla Borrego ? Erin Bell ?	Report	Caitlin Thwaites ? Susan Pratley ?

Monday 17 March	Waikato Bay of Plenty Magic	61 – 57	Southern Steel	Claudelands Arena
7:40pm	Joanne Harten 39/42 (93%); Ellen Halpenny 22/29 (76%)	Report	Jodi Brown 18/21 (86%); Jhaniele Fowler-Reid 39/41 (95%)

=== Round 4 ===
Saturday 22 March	Southern Steel	66 – 65	West Coast Fever	Stadium Southland Velodrome
4:20pm	Jodi Brown 24/29 (83%); Jhaniele Fowler-Reid 42/43 (98%)	Report	Caitlin Bassett 50/53 (94%); Natalie Medhurst 15/17 (88%)

Sunday 23 March	New South Wales Swifts	53 – 48	Queensland Firebirds	Sydney Olympic Park Sports Centre
12:18pm	Caitlin Thwaites 29/32 (91%); Susan Pratley 23/30 (77%); Carla Dziwoki 1/1 (100%)	Report	Romelda Aiken 36/50 (72%); Amy Wild 12/14 (86%)

Sunday 23 March	Melbourne Vixens	44 – 49	Waikato Bay of Plenty Magic	Hisense Arena
2:18pm	Tegan Caldwell 16/19 (84%); Karyn Bailey 18/19 (95%); Catherine Cox 10/13 (77%)	Report; Stats	Joanne Harten 28/35 (80%); Ellen Halpenny 21/26 (81%)

Sunday 23 March	Central Pulse	53 – 55	Mainland Tactix	Pettigrew Green Arena
7:20pm	Donna Wilkins 14/16 (88%); Irene van Dyk 39/42 (93%)	Report	Mwai Kumwenda 47/52 (90%); Anna Thompson 8/15 (53%)

Monday 24 March	Northern Mystics	71 – 68	Adelaide Thunderbirds	The Trusts Arena
7:40pm	Maria Tutaia 30/37 (81%); Cathrine Latu 56/59 (95%)	Report; Stats	Carla Borrego 52/64 (81%); Erin Bell 28/34 (82%)

=== Round 5 ===
Sunday 30 March	Adelaide Thunderbirds	59 – 61	Southern Steel	Netball SA Stadium
11:48am	Carla Borrego 33/39 (85%); Erin Bell 26/29 (90%)	Report	Jodi Brown 11/12 (92%); Jhaniele Fowler-Reid 50/59 (85%)

Sunday 30 March	Queensland Firebirds	58 – 50	Northern Mystics	Brisbane Convention and Exhibition Centre
1:18pm	Romelda Aiken 35/41 (85%); Amy Wild 16/22 (73%); Ameliaranne Wells 7/10 (70%)	Report	Maria Tutaia 20/24 (83%); Cathrine Latu 30/30 (100%)

Sunday 30 March	Waikato Bay of Plenty Magic	65 – 48	West Coast Fever	ASB Arena
7:20pm	Joanne Harten 46/51 (90%); Ellen Halpenny 19/23 (83%)	Report	Caitlin Bassett 26/32 (81%); Natalie Medhurst 15/22 (68%); Kate Beveridge 7/9 (78%)

Monday 31 March	Mainland Tactix	43 – 67	Melbourne Vixens	CBS Canterbury Arena
7:40pm	Mwai Kumwenda 30/38 (79%); Anna Thompson 9/15 (60%); Julianna Naoupu 4/9 (44%)	Report	Tegan Caldwell 24/26 (92%); Karyn Bailey 43/48 (90%)

Monday 31 March	New South Wales Swifts	63 – 45	Central Pulse	Sydney Olympic Park Sports Centre
7:48pm	Caitlin Thwaites 30/36 (83%); Susan Pratley 27/30 (90%); Gretel Tippett 6/11 (55%)	Report	Donna Wilkins 13/16 (81%); Irene van Dyk 32/34 (94%)

=== Round 6 ===
Sunday 6 April	West Coast Fever	53 – 51	Adelaide Thunderbirds	Challenge Stadium
10:18am	Caitlin Bassett 39/48 (81%); Natalie Medhurst 14/17 (82%)	Report	Carla Borrego 23/30 (77%); Erin Bell 28/36 (78%)

Sunday 6 April	Southern Steel	61 – 67	Northern Mystics	Stadium Southland Velodrome
7:20pm	Jodi Brown 14/17 (82%); Jhaniele Fowler-Reid 47/49 (96%)	Report	Maria Tutaia 21/28 (75%); Cathrine Latu 46/46 (100%)

Monday 7 April	Waikato Bay of Plenty Magic	53 – 56	Central Pulse	Claudelands Arena
7:40pm	Joanne Harten 26/27 (96%); Ellen Halpenny 27/28 (96%)	Report	Donna Wilkins 24/29 (83%); Irene van Dyk 32/36 (89%)

Monday 7 April	Queensland Firebirds	38 – 50	Melbourne Vixens	Brisbane Convention & Exhibition Centre
7:48pm	Romelda Aiken 25/31 (81%); Amy Wild 9/12 (75%) ? ?	Report	Tegan Caldwell 28/32 (88%); Karyn Bailey 13/17 (76%) ? ?	Attendance: 3,100

BYES: New South Wales Swifts and Mainland Tactix

=== Round 7 ===
Sunday 13 April	New South Wales Swifts	50 – 56	Melbourne Vixens	Sydney Olympic Park Sports Centre
12:18pm	Caitlin Thwaites ? Susan Pratley 28/33 (85%)	Report	Tegan Caldwell ? Karyn Bailey ? Catherine Cox 18/19 (95%)

Sunday 13 April	West Coast Fever	48 – 42	Queensland Firebirds	Challenge Stadium
12:18pm	Caitlin Bassett 39/43 (91%); Natalie Medhurst ? Kate Beveridge ? Chelsea Pitman 3/7 (43%)	Report; Stats	Romelda Aiken 24/33 (73%); Amy Wild ?	Attendance: 2,700

Sunday 13 April	Northern Mystics	65 – 62	Mainland Tactix	The Trusts Arena
7:20pm	Maria Tutaia 17/19 (89%); Cathrine Latu 48/49 (98%)	Report	Mwai Kumwenda 43/44 (98%); Anna Thompson 19/22 (86%)

Monday 14 April	Southern Steel	54 – 62	Central Pulse	Stadium Southland Velodrome
7:40pm	Jodi Brown 7/11 (64%); Jhaniele Fowler-Reid 47/49 (96%)	Report	Donna Wilkins 27/30 (90%); Irene van Dyk 35/36 (97%)

BYES: Adelaide Thunderbirds and Waikato Bay of Plenty Magic

=== Round 8 ===
Saturday 19 April	Melbourne Vixens	64 – 26	Adelaide Thunderbirds	Hisense Arena
2:18pm	Tegan Caldwell 12/16 (75%); Karyn Bailey 34/36 (94%); Catherine Cox 18/25 (72%)	Report; Stats	Carla Borrego ? Erin Bell ? Cody Lange 12/22 (55%)

Sunday 20 April	Queensland Firebirds	55 – 40	New South Wales Swifts	Brisbane Convention & Exhibition Centre
12:18pm	Romelda Aiken 36; Ameliaranne Wells 10; Amy Wild 9	Report	Caitlin Thwaites 13; Susan Pratley 24; Gretel Tippett 3	Attendance: 3,000

Sunday 20 April	Waikato Bay of Plenty Magic	56 – 50	Northern Mystics	Claudelands Arena
7:20pm	Joanne Harten 44/46 (96%); Ellen Halpenny 12/20 (60%)	Report	Maria Tutaia 33/37 (89%); Cathrine Latu 17/20 (85%)

Monday 21 April	Mainland Tactix	61 – 77	Southern Steel	CBS Canterbury Arena
7:40pm	Mwai Kumwenda 49/52 (94%); Anna Thompson 12/20 (60%)	Report	Jodi Brown 16/19 (84%); Jhaniele Fowler-Reid 60/61 (98%); Te Paea Selby-Rickit 1/1 (100%)

BYES: West Coast Fever and Central Pulse

=== Round 9 ===
Friday 25 April	New South Wales Swifts	65 – 52	Southern Steel	AIS Arena
1:48pm	Caitlin Thwaites 32/35 (91%); Susan Pratley 23/27 (85%); Carla Dziwoki 9/10 (90%); Gretel Tippett 1/3 (33%)	Report; Stats	Jodi Brown 8/10 (80%); Jhaniele Fowler-Reid 42/45 (93%); Te Paea Selby-Rickit 2/4 (50%)

Saturday 26 April	Central Pulse	40 – 52	Melbourne Vixens	TSB Bank Arena
4:20pm	Donna Wilkins 18/23 (78%); Irene van Dyk 22/29 (76%)	Report; Stats	Tegan Caldwell 22/23 (96%); Karyn Bailey 30/35 (86%)

Sunday 27 April	Queensland Firebirds	50 – 48	West Coast Fever	Brisbane Convention & Exhibition Centre
12:18pm	Romelda Aiken ? Amy Wild ?		Caitlin Bassett ? Natalie Medhurst ?

Sunday 27 April	Waikato Bay of Plenty Magic	50 – 49	Adelaide Thunderbirds	Energy Events Centre
7:20pm	Joanne Harten 36/41 (88%); Ellen Halpenny 14/19 (74%)	Report	Carla Borrego 23/26 (88%); Erin Bell 26/30 (87%)

Monday 28 April	Mainland Tactix	60 – 61	Northern Mystics	CBS Canterbury Arena
7:40pm	Mwai Kumwenda 53/60 (88%); Anna Thompson 7/12 (58%)	Report	Maria Tutaia 18/23 (78%); Cathrine Latu 43/46 (93%)

=== Round 10 ===
Saturday 3 May	Adelaide Thunderbirds	57 – 50	West Coast Fever	Netball SA Stadium
1:48pm	Carla Borrego 21; Erin Bell 36	Report	Caitlin Bassett 37; Natalie Medhurst 13

Sunday 4 May	Melbourne Vixens	50 – 54	New South Wales Swifts	Hisense Arena
12:18pm	Tegan Caldwell 22/24 (92%); Karyn Bailey 14/18 (78%); Catherine Cox 14/18 (78%)	Report	Caitlin Thwaites 26/31 (84%); Susan Pratley 28/32 (88%)

Sunday 4 May	Queensland Firebirds	69 – 52	Mainland Tactix	Gold Coast Convention and Exhibition Centre
2:18pm	Romelda Aiken 54/57 (95%); Amy Wild 8/12 (67%); Ameliaranne Wells 7/8 (88%)	Report; Stats	Mwai Kumwenda 40/45 (89%); Anna Thompson 12/17 (71%)

Sunday 4 May	Northern Mystics	61 – 73	Southern Steel	The Trusts Arena
7:20pm	Maria Tutaia 23/29 (79%); Cathrine Latu 34/34 (100%); Bailey Mes 4/4 (100%)	Report	Jodi Brown 25/30 (83%); Jhaniele Fowler-Reid 46/51 (90%); Te Paea Selby-Rickit 2/3 (67%)

Monday 5 May	Central Pulse	54 – 44	Waikato Bay of Plenty Magic	Te Rauparaha Arena
7:40pm	Donna Wilkins 29/34 (85%); Irene van Dyk 24/29 (83%); Paula Griffin 1/1 (100%)	Report	Joanne Harten 30/35 (86%); Ellen Halpenny 9/10 (90%); Malia Paseka 5/8 (63%)

=== Round 11 ===
Sunday 11 May	Adelaide Thunderbirds	52 – 58	Queensland Firebirds	Netball SA Stadium
11:48am	Carla Borrego 25/30 (83%); Erin Bell 27/31 (87%)	Report; Stats	Romelda Aiken 40/48 (83%); Amy Wild 18/21 (86%)

Sunday 11 May	Mainland Tactix	50 – 58	Central Pulse	Saxton Stadium, Nelson
7:20pm	Mwai Kumwenda 42/44 (95%); Anna Thompson 8/14 (57%)	Report; Stats	Irene van Dyk 43/45 (96%); Paula Griffin 15/18 (83%)

Monday 12 May	West Coast Fever	47 – 58	New South Wales Swifts	Perth Arena
6:48pm	Caitlin Bassett 31/37 (84%); Natalie Medhurst 16/18 (89%)	Report; Stats	Caitlin Thwaites 33/42 (79%); Susan Pratley 25/31 (81%)

Monday 12 May	Southern Steel	62 – 57	Waikato Bay of Plenty Magic	Stadium Southland Velodrome
7:40pm	Jodi Brown 21/26 (81%); Jhaniele Fowler-Reid 41/42 (98%)	Report	Joanne Harten 31/33 (94%); Ellen Halpenny 26/34 (76%)

BYES: Melbourne Vixens and Northern Mystics

=== Round 12 ===
Sunday 18 May	Melbourne Vixens	65 – 46	West Coast Fever	Hisense Arena
12:18pm	Tegan Caldwell 37/43 (86%); Karyn Bailey 20/ 27 (74%); Catherine Cox 8/8 (100%)	Report	Caitlin Bassett 23/30 (77%); Natalie Medhurst 17/23 (74%)

Sunday 18 May	New South Wales Swifts	45 – 42	Adelaide Thunderbirds	Sydney SuperDome
2:18pm	Caitlin Thwaites ? Susan Pratley ?	Report	Carla Borrego ? Erin Bell ?	Attendance: 10,118

Sunday 18 May	Central Pulse	49 – 45	Northern Mystics	Arena Manawatu
7:20pm	Donna Wilkins 16/16 (100%); Irene van Dyk 25/28 (89%); Paula Griffin 8/12 (67%)	Report	Maria Tutaia 20/24 (83%); Cathrine Latu 25/26 (96%)

Monday 19 May	Waikato Bay of Plenty Magic	74 – 56	Mainland Tactix	ASB Arena
7:40pm	Joanne Harten 40/44 (91%); Ellen Halpenny 34/36 (94%)	Report	Mwai Kumwenda 48/51 (94%); Anna Thompson 8/12 (67%)

BYES: Queensland Firebirds and Southern Steel

=== Round 13 ===
Saturday 24 May	Queensland Firebirds	60 – 33	Central Pulse	Brisbane Convention and Exhibition Centre
2:18pm	Romelda Aiken 46/53 (87%); Amy Wild 14/22 (64%)	Report	Donna Wilkins 13/16 (81%); Irene van Dyk 12/13 (92%); Paula Griffin 8/12 (67%)

Sunday 25 May	Adelaide Thunderbirds	43 – 64	Melbourne Vixens	Netball SA Stadium
11:48am	Carla Borrego 22/28 (79%); Erin Bell 21/24 (88%)	Report	Tegan Caldwell 24/34 (71%); Karyn Bailey 26/29 (90%); Catherine Cox 14/16 (88%)

Sunday 25 May	New South Wales Swifts	55 – 43	Waikato Bay of Plenty Magic	Sydney Olympic Park Sports Centre
2:18pm	Caitlin Thwaites 25/31 (81%); Susan Pratley 30/38 (79%)	Report; Stats	Joanne Harten 22/28 (79%); Ellen Halpenny 12/15 (80%); Malia Paseka 9/13 (69%)

Sunday 25 May	Southern Steel	64 – 60	Mainland Tactix	More FM Arena
7:20pm	Jodi Brown 26/37 (70%); Jhaniele Fowler-Reid 11/11 (100%); Te Paea Selby-Rickit 27/32 (84%)	Report	Mwai Kumwenda 52/58 (90%); Anna Thompson 8/12 (67%)

Monday 26 May	Northern Mystics	63 – 51	West Coast Fever	The Trusts Arena
7:40pm	Maria Tutaia 24/35 (69%); Cathrine Latu 39/43 (91%)	Report	Caitlin Bassett 35/37 (95%); Natalie Medhurst 12/12 (100%); Kate Beveridge 4/6 (67%)

=== Round 14 ===
Saturday 31 May	Southern Steel	65 – 64	Melbourne Vixens	Stadium Southland Velodrome
4:20pm	Jodi Brown 21/29 (72%); Jhaniele Fowler-Reid 44/48 (92%)	Report; Stats	Tegan Caldwell 34/38 (89%); Karyn Bailey 13/13 (100%); Catherine Cox 17/19 (89%)

Sunday 1 June	Adelaide Thunderbirds	66 – 49	Mainland Tactix	Netball SA Stadium
11:48am	Carla Borrego 36/53 (68%); Erin Bell 30/31 (97%)	Report	Mwai Kumwenda 42/47 (89%); Anna Thompson 5/10 (50%); Sophia Fenwick 2/4 (50%)

Sunday 1 June	Northern Mystics	56 – 53	New South Wales Swifts	The Trusts Arena
7:20pm	Maria Tutaia 24/31 (77%); Cathrine Latu 32/33 (97%)	Report	Caitlin Thwaites 34/40 (85%); Susan Pratley 19/24 (79%)

Monday 2 June	West Coast Fever	51 – 44	Central Pulse	Challenge Stadium
5:48pm	Caitlin Bassett 37/42 (88%); Natalie Medhurst 14/17 (82%)	Report	Donna Wilkins 26/35 (74%); Irene van Dyk 6/7 (86%); Paula Griffin 12/17 (71%)

Monday 2 June	Waikato Bay of Plenty Magic	55 – 59	Queensland Firebirds	Claudelands Arena
7:40pm	Joanne Harten 29/35 (83%); Ellen Halpenny 26/34 (76%)	Report	Romelda Aiken 40/45 (89%); Amy Wild 19/20 (95%)

=== Final standings ===
2014 ANZ Championship ladder
Pos	Team	Pld	W	L	GF	GA	GD	G%	Pts
1	Melbourne Vixens	13	9	4	746	592	+154	126.0	18
2	Queensland Firebirds	13	9	4	694	623	+71	111.4	18
3	New South Wales Swifts	13	9	4	707	652	+55	108.4	18
4	Waikato Bay of Plenty Magic	13	8	5	727	672	+55	108.2	16
5	Southern Steel	13	7	6	792	809	−17	97.9	14
6	Central Pulse	13	7	6	658	675	−17	97.5	14
7	Northern Mystics	13	6	7	706	752	−46	93.9	12
8	Adelaide Thunderbirds	13	5	8	663	706	−43	93.9	10
9	West Coast Fever	13	4	9	689	724	−35	95.2	8
10	Mainland Tactix	13	1	12	694	871	−177	79.7	2
Updated 2 May 2021

Qualified for Major semi-final
Qualified for Minor semi-final

- Pld = Games played
- W = Win (2 points)
- L = Loss (0 points)
- GF = Goals For
- GA = Goals Against
- GD = Goals Difference (= GF−GA)
- G% = Goal percentage (= 100 × GF/GA)

Pts = Points

== Finals ==
Semifinals
9 June – John Cain Arena
Melbourne Vixens	52
Queensland Firebirds	47
8 June – Sydney SuperDome
New South Wales Swifts	49
Waikato Bay of Plenty Magic	50

Preliminary final
16 June – Brisbane Convention & Exhibition Centre
Queensland Firebirds	54
Waikato Bay of Plenty Magic	50

Grand final
22 June – John Cain Arena
Melbourne Vixens	53
Queensland Firebirds	42

=== Minor semi-final ===
Sunday 8 June; 2:18pm	Stats	New South Wales Swifts	49–50	Waikato Bay of Plenty Magic	Sydney SuperDome; Attendance: 5,610	Fox Sports; Sky Sport
Sunday 8 June; 2:18pm	Stats	Scoring by quarter: 14–13, 14–25, 12–14, 9–12			Sydney SuperDome; Attendance: 5,610	Fox Sports; Sky Sport
Sunday 8 June; 2:18pm	Stats	Caitlin Thwaites 24/27 (89%); Susan Pratley 25/29 (86%)		Joanne Harten 28/35 (80%); Ellen Halpenny 22/26 (85%)	Sydney SuperDome; Attendance: 5,610	Fox Sports; Sky Sport

=== Major semi-final ===
Monday 9 June; 5:48pm	Stats	Melbourne Vixens	52–47	Queensland Firebirds	Hisense Arena	Fox Sports; Sky Sport
Monday 9 June; 5:48pm	Stats	Scoring by quarter: 16–11, 11-13, 14–13, 11–12			Hisense Arena	Fox Sports; Sky Sport
Monday 9 June; 5:48pm	Stats	Tegan Caldwell 27/36 (75%); Karyn Bailey 25/29 (86%)		Romelda Aiken 35/41 (85%); Amy Wild 12/15 (80%)	Hisense Arena	Fox Sports; Sky Sport

=== Preliminary final ===
Monday 16 June; 7:18pm	Stats	Queensland Firebirds	54–50	Waikato Bay of Plenty Magic	Brisbane Convention and Exhibition Centre; Attendance: 3,200	Fox Sports; Sky Sport
Monday 16 June; 7:18pm	Stats	Scoring by quarter: 14–13, 15–13, 11–11, 14–13			Brisbane Convention and Exhibition Centre; Attendance: 3,200	Fox Sports; Sky Sport
Monday 16 June; 7:18pm	Stats	Romelda Aiken 36/44 (82%); Amy Wild 18/21 (86%)		Joanne Harten 29/38 (76%); Ellen Halpenny 21/24 (88%)	Brisbane Convention and Exhibition Centre; Attendance: 3,200	Fox Sports; Sky Sport

=== Grand final ===
Sunday 22 June; 2:28pm	Stats	Melbourne Vixens	53–42	Queensland Firebirds	Hisense Arena; Attendance: 9,345	Fox Sports; Sky Sport
Sunday 22 June; 2:28pm	Stats	Scoring by quarter: 13–11, 11–11, 13–12, 16–8			Hisense Arena; Attendance: 9,345	Fox Sports; Sky Sport
Sunday 22 June; 2:28pm	Stats	Tegan Caldwell 30/33 (91%); Karyn Bailey 17/22 (77%); Catherine Cox 6/7 (86%)		Romelda Aiken 25/30 (83%); Amy Wild 17/21 (81%)	Hisense Arena; Attendance: 9,345	Fox Sports; Sky Sport

== Award winners ==
=== ANZ Championship awards ===
Award	Winner	Team
ANZ Championship MVP	(Australia) Kimberlee Green ^{(Note 4)}	New South Wales Swifts
ANZ Championship MVP	(England) Joanne Harten ^{(Note 4)}	Waikato Bay of Plenty Magic
ANZ Championship Grand Final MVP	(Australia) Tegan Caldwell	Melbourne Vixens
ANZ Championship Best New Talent	(Malawi) Mwai Kumwenda	Mainland Tactix

Notes

- ^4 Kimberlee Green and Joanne Harten shared the MVP award.

=== All Star Team ===
Position	Player	Team
GS	(Jamaica) Jhaniele Fowler-Reid	Southern Steel
GA	(Australia) Susan Pratley	New South Wales Swifts
WA	(Australia) Madison Robinson	Melbourne Vixens
C	(Australia) Kimberlee Green	New South Wales Swifts
WD	(Australia) Renae Hallinan	Adelaide Thunderbirds
GD	(New Zealand) Casey Kopua	Waikato Bay of Plenty Magic
GK	(England) Geva Mentor	Melbourne Vixens
Coach	(Australia) Julie Fitzgerald	Waikato Bay of Plenty Magic

=== Australian Netball Awards ===
Award	Winner	Team
Australian ANZ Championship Player of the Year	Laura Geitz	Queensland Firebirds
Liz Ellis Diamond	Madison Robinson	Melbourne Vixens
Australian ANZ Championship Coach of the Year	Simone McKinnis	Melbourne Vixens
Joyce Brown Coach of the Year	Roselee Jencke	Queensland Firebirds

=== Golden Bib Award ===
In 2014 the ANZ Championship introduced the Golden Bib Award which recognised the top attacker, top midcourter and top defender from each round. The award is determined on statistics and players earned two points for a goal assist and a point for centre pass receive.

Round	Attacker	Midcourter	Defender
1	(New Zealand) Ellen Halpenny (Magic)	(New Zealand) Grace Rasmussen (Magic)	(England) Geva Mentor (Vixens)
2	(Malawi) Mwai Kumwenda (Tactix)	(Australia) Madison Robinson (Vixens) (Australia) Brooke Miller (Swifts)	(New Zealand) Leana de Bruin (Magic)
3	(Australia) Caitlin Bassett (Fever)	(New Zealand) Grace Rasmussen (Magic)	(England) Eboni Beckford-Chambers (Fever)
4	(Australia) Caitlin Bassett (Fever)	(New Zealand) Grace Rasmussen (Magic)	(New Zealand) Casey Kopua (Magic)
5	(Australia) Tegan Caldwell (Vixens)	(New Zealand) Grace Rasmussen (Magic)	(England) Geva Mentor (Vixens)
6	(Jamaica) Jhaniele Fowler-Reid (Steel)	(New Zealand) Laura Langman (Mystics)	(Australia) Laura Geitz (Firebirds)
7	(Jamaica) Jhaniele Fowler-Reid (Steel)	(Australia) Madison Robinson (Vixens)	(Australia) Laura Geitz (Firebirds)
8	(Jamaica) Jhaniele Fowler-Reid (Steel)	(Australia) Madison Robinson (Vixens)	(England) Geva Mentor (Vixens)
9	(New Zealand) Cathrine Latu (Mystics)	(Australia) Madison Robinson (Vixens)	(New Zealand) Katrina Grant (Pulse)
10	(Jamaica) Romelda Aiken (Firebirds)	(Australia) Emily Beaton (Thunderbirds)	(England) Geva Mentor (Vixens)
11	(New Zealand) Irene van Dyk (Pulse)	(New Zealand) Grace Rasmussen (Magic)	(Australia) Laura Geitz (Firebirds)
12	(New Zealand) Ellen Halpenny (Magic) (England) Joanne Harten (Magic)	(Australia) Madison Robinson (Vixens)	(Australia) Bianca Chatfield (Vixens)
13	(Jamaica) Romelda Aiken (Firebirds)	(Australia) Madison Robinson (Vixens)	(New Zealand) Casey Kopua (Magic)
14	(Australia) Erin Bell (Thunderbirds)	(New Zealand) Shannon Francois (Steel)	(Australia) Rebecca Bulley (Thunderbirds)

== Media coverage ==
All 69 matches were broadcast live on Fox Sports (Australia) and Sky Sport (New Zealand). SBS 2 also broadcast a live match every Sunday and showed weekly highlights of all the matches every Wednesday. In New Zealand, Māori Television also agreed a deal with Sky which saw Te Reo screen delayed coverage of one game from each round, plus the finals, on Tuesday nights. In Australia, National Indigenous Television broadcast one match per week throughout the season.
