= Victorian Netball League =

Netball league in Australia

- Founded: 2009
- Country: Australia
- Region: Victoria
- Divisions: Championship; 23 & Under
- Number of clubs: 12
- Level on pyramid: 2
- Current champions: City West Falcons
- Most championships: City West Falcons (7 Championship titles)
- Website: vic.netball.com.au

The Victorian Netball League (VNL) is a state netball league featuring teams from Victoria, Australia. The league is organised by Netball Victoria, with the modern league beginning in 2009. It replaced an earlier state league as the top level netball competition in Victoria. On a national level, the VNL is effectively a third-tier league, below Suncorp Super Netball and the Australian Netball Championships.

From 2009-2011, due to sponsorship and naming rights arrangements, the VNL was known as the Holden Cruze Cup. Between 2018-2020, the league was sponsored by Bupa and was known as the Bupa Victorian Netball League.

A change at the end of the 2023 season saw three divisions (Championship, Division 1 and 19 & Under) become two - with Division 1 and 19 & Under replaced with a 23 & Under division. It also saw the inclusion of new clubs Bendigo Strikers, Gippsland Stars and Western Warriors. The Stars will initially field a 23 & Under team, before entering the Championship division by 2027.

Nine existing clubs (Boroondara, Casey, City West, Geelong, Hawks, Lightning, Blaze, Waves and Saints) had their licenses renewed, with foundation club Ariels a casualty of the restructure.

The league's most successful team, City West Falcons (originally known as Hume City Falcons), have won seven Championship titles and 17 premierships in total, to the end of 2023.

== History ==
=== Foundation ===
The modern league began in 2009, replacing an earlier Netball Victoria state league as the top level netball competition in Victoria. The earlier league featured eighteen teams but, after restructuring, the number was reduced to ten. The founding ten members of the new league were Ballarat Pride, Boroondara Genesis, Geelong Cougars, Hume City Falcons, Monash University Central, North East Blaze, Peninsula Waves, Southern Saints, VU Western Lightning and Yarra Valley Grammar Ariels. The league featured three divisions – Championship, Division 1 and 19 & Under. The ten teams entered a team in each of the three divisions. The new structure was designed to encourage player development.

=== City West Falcons ===
The league's most successful team has been City West Falcons, who have won seven Championship titles and 17 premierships in total, across three divisions. As Hume City Falcons, they won the inaugural Championship in 2009 and claimed it again the following year With a team that included Kathleen Knott, they won their first Championship as City West Falcons in 2012 and again in 2013. In 2018, Falcons won their fifth Championship title. Falcons won their sixth Championship title in 2022, also winning the 19 & Under Grand Final.

=== Victorian Fury ===
The Australian Netball League team Victorian Fury is effectively the representative team of the VNL. In turn, Fury is the reserve team of Melbourne Vixens.

== Teams ==
=== Current ===
Team	Colours	Home venue/base	Debut season	Championships	
Team	Colours	Home venue/base	Debut season	Total	Years
Bendigo Strikers		Red Energy Stadium, West Bendigo	2024	0	-
Boroondara Express		Boroondara Sports Complex, Balwyn North	2009	1	2015
Casey Demons		Casey Stadium, Cranbourne East	2019	0	-
City West Falcons		Maribyrnong College, Maribyrnong	2009 (as Hume City Falcons)	9	2009, 2010, 2012, 2013, 2018, 2022, 2023, 2024, 2025
Geelong Cougars		Geelong Arena, North Geelong	2009	1	2019
Gippsland Stars		Gippsland Regional Indoor Sports Stadium, Traralgon	2024	0	-
Hawks Netball		State Netball Centre, Parkville	2009 (as Monash Storm)	2	2011, 2026
Melbourne University Lightning		State Netball Centre, Parkville	2009 (as VU Western Lightning)	1	2016
North East Blaze		Community Bank Stadium, Diamond Creek	2009	1	2017
Peninsula Waves		Jubilee Park Stadium, Frankston	2009	0	-
Wilson Storage Southern Saints		Bayside Netball Centre, Sandringham	2009	1	2014
Western Warriors		Cobblebank Indoor Stadium, Cobblebank	2024	0	-

Notes

- ^1 Ariels VCNA previously played as Yarra Valley Grammar Ariels.
- ^2 Boroondara Express previously played as Boroondara Genesis.
- ^3 Casey Demons are affiliated to both the VFL Casey Demons and Melbourne Football Club.
- ^4 City West Falcons previously played as Hume City Falcons.
- ^5 Hawks Netball previously played as Melbourne Central, Monash University Central, Monash University Storm. In 2018 they adopted their current name after forming a partnership with Hawthorn Football Club.
- ^6 Between 2009 and 2014, Melbourne University Lightning had a partnership with Victoria University and played as VU-Western Lightning.

=== Former teams ===
Team	Home city/town/suburb	Debut season	Final season
Ballarat Pride	Ballarat	2009	2014
ACU Sovereigns	Ballarat	2015	2018
Ariels	Maroondah Nets	2009	2023

== Championship Grand Finals ==
Season	Winners	Score	Runners up	Venue
2009	Hume City Falcons	47–44	Boroondara Genesis	SNHC
2010	Hume City Falcons			SNHC
2011	Monash University Storm		Boroondara Express	SNHC
2012	City West Falcons	42–37	VU-Western Lightning	SNHC
2013	City West Falcons	44–41	Peninsula Waves	SNHC
2014	Southern Saints	48–42	City West Falcons	SNHC
2015	Boroondara Express	50–44	City West Falcons	SNHC
2016	Melbourne University Lightning	53–52	City West Falcons	SNHC
2017	North East Blaze	49–46	Melbourne University Lightning	SNHC
2018	City West Falcons	56–48	Geelong Cougars	SNHC
2019	Geelong Cougars	69–55	Casey Demons	SNHC
2020	No competition due to COVID-19 pandemic			
2021	No finals series played			
2022	City West Falcons	49–47	Geelong Cougars	SNHC
2023	City West Falcons	60-54	Boroondara Express	SNHC
2024	City West Falcons	64-53	Boroondara Express	SNHC
2025	City West Falcons	60-58	Hawks	SNHC
2026	Hawks	66-55	Casey Demons	SNHC

== Notable players ==
The VNL is effectively a feeder league for the Suncorp Super Netball teams Melbourne Vixens and Collingwood Magpies. VNL players have also played for the Australia national netball team and other international teams.

=== Internationals ===
Australia

- Erin Bell
- Kelsey Browne
- Tegan Caldwell
- Julie Corletto
- Renae Ingles
- Wendy Jones
- Cynna Kydd
- Sharni Layton
- Kate Moloney
- Caitlyn Nevins
- Elizabeth Watson
- Jo Weston

Malawi

- Mwai Kumwenda

Scotland

- Fiona Themann

Sri Lanka

- Tharjini Sivalingam

=== Melbourne Vixens ===
- Karyn Bailey
- Kelsey Browne
- Julie Corletto
- Lara Dunkley
- Shannon Eagland
- Kate Eddy
- Erin Hoare
- Ashlee Howard
- Renae Ingles
- Wendy Jones
- Kathleen Knott
- Sharni Layton
- Kara Richards
- Alice Teague-Neeld
- Brooke Thompson
- Elizabeth Watson
- Jo Weston
- Micaela Wilson

=== Collingwood Magpies ===
- Melissa Bragg
- Kelsey Browne
- Matilda Garrett
- Molly Jovic
- Maggie Lind
- Kelsie Rainbow
- Gabrielle Sinclair
- Micaela Wilson

=== Award winners ===
Margaret Caldow Trophy

The Championship MVP award is named after Margaret Caldow.

Season	Player	Team
2009	Brooke Thompson	VU Western Lightning
2010		
2011	Melinda Cranston	Boroondara Genesis
2012	Caitlyn Strachan ^{(Note 1)}	Yarra Valley Grammar Ariels
2012	Mwai Kumwenda	Peninsula Waves
2012	Helen Barclay	Monash University Central
2013	Caitlyn Strachan^{(Note 2)}	Yarra Valley Grammar Ariels
2013	Brooke Thompson	VU Western Lightning
2014	Chloe Watson	City West Falcons
2015	Kathleen Knott	City West Falcons
2016	Maggie Lind	City West Falcons
2017	Micaela Wilson	North East Blaze
2018		
2019	Julia Woolley	Geelong Cougars
2020	Not awarded	
2021	Julia Woolley ^{(Note 3)}	Geelong Cougars
2021	Maggie Lind	City West Falcons
2022	Nyah Allen	North East Blaze

Notes

- ^1 2012 award was shared.
- ^2 2013 award was shared.
- ^3 2021 award was shared.

Player of the Championship Grand Final

Season	Player	Team
2009	Ashlee Howard	Boroondara Genesis
2010		
2011		
2012	Christie Barnes	City West Falcons
2013	Elizabeth Watson	City West Falcons
2014	Leah Percy	Southern Saints
2015	Sarah Yule	Boroondara Express
2016	Dani Stewart	Melbourne University Lightning
2017	Micaela Wilson	North East Blaze
2018		
2019	Vanessa Augustini	Geelong Cougars
2022	Zoe Davies	City West Falcons

== Main sponsors ==
	Years
Holden Cruze	2009–2011
Devine Homes	2012–2013
Bupa	2018–2020
No sponsor	2021-current
