= Caitlyn Nevins =

Australia netball international

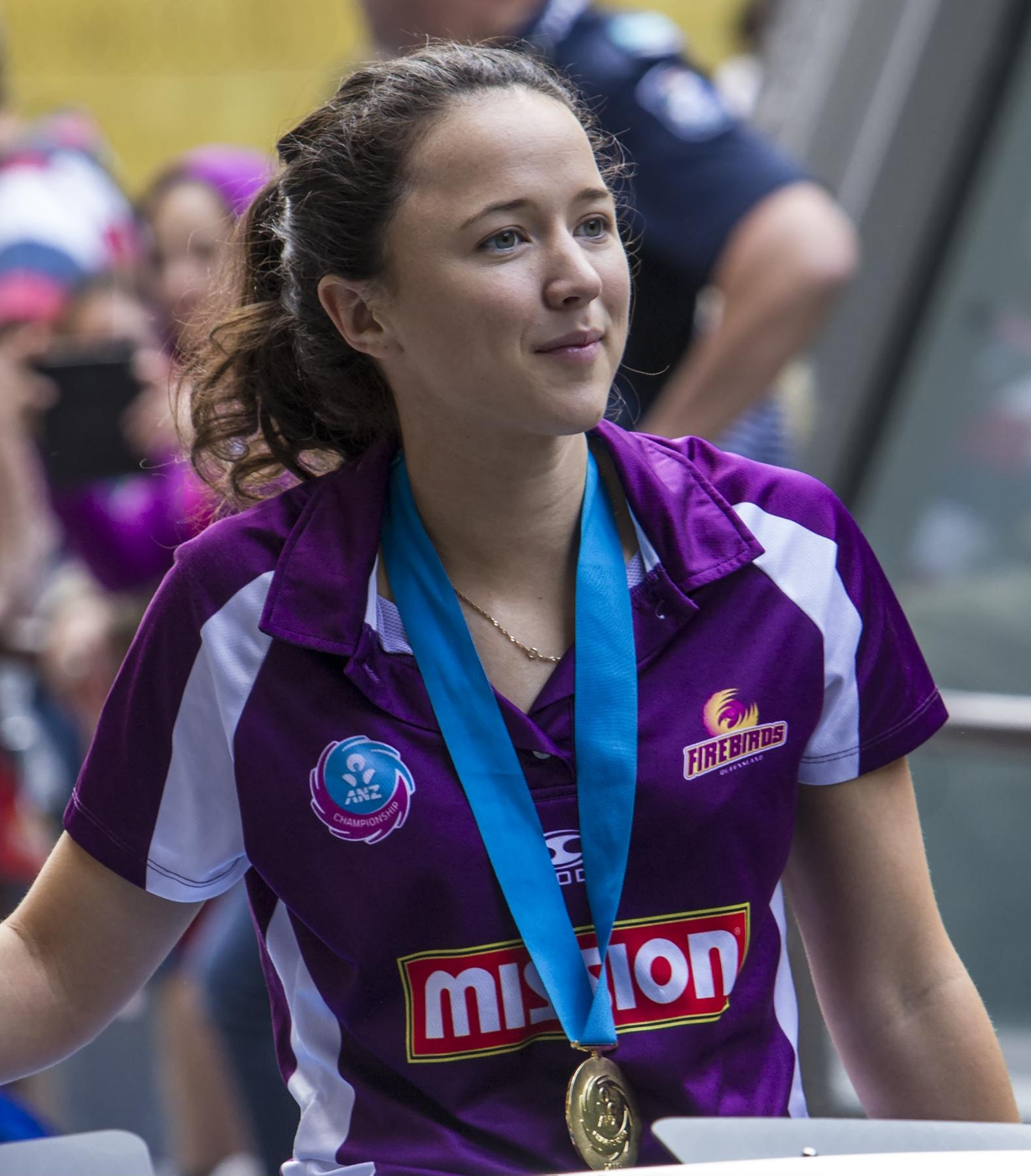

Personal information
- Full name: Caitlyn Nevins (Née: Strachan)
- Born: 1 June 1987 (age 39) Geelong, Victoria
- Height: 1.73 m (5 ft 8 in)
- School: Echuca High School
- University: La Trobe University

Netball career
- Playing positions: WA, C
Years	Club team	Apps
200x–200x	Echuca United	
2006–2011	Southern Saints	
2009	Victorian Fury	
2011	Canberra Darters	
2012–2014	Victorian Fury	
2012–2014	→ Yarra Valley Grammar Ariels	
2013–2014	Melbourne Vixens	
2015–2019	Queensland Firebirds	
Years	National team	Caps
2016–2017	Australia	
Medal record
Representing Australia
Fast5 Netball World Series
Silver medal – second place	2016 Melbourne	Team

Caitlyn Strachan (born 1 June 1987), formerly known as Caitlyn Nevins, is an Australian former netball player. Between 2014 and 2016, she was a member of three successive ANZ Championship winning teams. She won her first title with the 2014 Melbourne Vixens before winning the 2015 and 2016 titles with Queensland Firebirds. She was a member of the Victorian Fury teams that won Australian Netball League titles in 2009, 2013 and 2014.

== Early life, family and education ==
Strachan is the daughter of Lyn and Rob Strachan. She is originally from Victoria, born in Geelong and raised in Echuca. Between 1999 and 2004 she attended Echuca High School and between 2005 and 2008 she attended La Trobe University where she gained a Bachelor of Podiatry. Throughout her netball career, Strachan continued to work as a podiatrist. In November 2014, Strachan married Sam Nevins, an osteopath.

== Playing career ==
=== Early career ===
In her youth, Strachan played both basketball and netball. She played basketball with Echuca Pirates and netball with the Echuca and District Netball Association and Echuca United Football Netball Club. Caitlyn represented Victoria in both netball and basketball in her junior years. At 17 she decided to focus solely on netball.

=== Victorian Netball League ===
Between 2006 and 2014, Strachan played for both Southern Saints and Yarra Valley Grammar Ariels in the Victorian Netball League, winning club best and fairest awards with both teams, and also held captaincy positions for both clubs. After six seasons with Saints, in 2012 Strachan switched to Ariels. In 2012 she shared the league's MVP award, the Margaret Caldow Trophy, with Helen Barclay and Mwai Kumwenda. In 2013 she again shared the award, this time with Brooke Thompson.

=== Australian Netball League ===
Victorian Fury

Strachan had two spells playing for Victorian Fury in the Australian Netball League. She initially played for Fury during the 2009 season. She again played for Fury between 2012 and 2014. She was a member of the Fury teams that won ANL titles in 2009, 2013 and 2014. She was vice captain of the 2013 and 2014 teams.

Canberra Darters

During the 2011 season, Strachan played was dropped by the Victorian Fury and played for Canberra Darters instead in the Australian Netball League. She played in 31 of 32 quarters for Darters. She was named the team's best and fairest player for the season and was subsequently inducted into the Netball ACT Hall of Fame.

=== Melbourne Vixens ===
Strachan was a member of the Melbourne Vixens team in 2013 as an injury replacement for Sharelle McMahon, and then obtained her first full time professional contract with the Melbourne Vixens ahead of the 2014 season. Strachan won the 2014 ANZ Championship. However she sat on the bench for most of the season, kept out of the starting seven by the form of Madi Robinson.

=== Queensland Firebirds ===
Between 2015 and 2019, Strachan, now known as Caitlyn Nevins, played for Queensland Firebirds, initially in the ANZ Championship and later in Suncorp Super Netball. She was a key member of the Firebirds teams that won back to back premierships in the 2015 and 2016 ANZ Championships seasons. Known for her game smarts, speed and agility, Nevins was the kind of player that made everyone around her better. She was often described as the unsung hero. Her leadership was recognised in 2017 she was appointed Firebirds vice-captain, a role she held throughout 2018 and 2019. In August 2019, Nevins announced her retirement from netball, effective at the end of the season.

=== Australia ===
After representing Australia at the 2016 Fast5 Netball World Series, Nevins made her senior debut during the first 2017 Netball Quad Series. On 28 January 2017 in the opening match against New Zealand, Nevins replaced Paige Hadley for the final quarter, helping Australia secure a 57–50 win. At 29, she became the oldest debutante for Australia in forty two years. On 31 January 2017, she made her first start for Australia in a 62–46 win against South Africa.

Tournaments	Place
2016 Fast5 Netball World Series	2nd place, silver medalist(s)
2017 Netball Quad Series (January/February)	1st place, gold medalist(s)

== Honours ==
Australia

- Netball Quad Series
  - Winners: 2017 (January/February)
- Fast5 Netball World Series
  - Runners Up: 2016

Queensland Firebirds

- ANZ Championship
  - Winners: 2015, 2016

Melbourne Vixens

- ANZ Championship
  - Winners: 2014

Victorian Fury

- Australian Netball League
  - Winners: 2009, 2013, 2014

Individual Awards

Year	Award
2011	Netball ACT Hall of Fame
2012	Margaret Caldow Trophy
2013	Margaret Caldow Trophy
