= Kelsie Rainbow =

Australian netball player (born 1996)

Personal information
- Born: 26 September 1996 (age 30) Winnaleah, Tasmania
- Height: 1.75 m (5 ft 9 in)
- School: Scotch Oakburn College
- University: Monash University

Netball career
- Playing positions: C, WA
Years	Club team	Apps
2011–2013	Cavaliers	
2015–2017	Monash University Storm	
2016–2017	Victorian Fury	
2018–	Melbourne University Lightning	
2018–	Tasmanian Magpies	
2018–	Collingwood Magpies	

Kelsie Rainbow (born 26 September 1996) is an Australian netball player who has played in the Victorian Netball League and the Australian Netball League. In 2018 she was a member of the Tasmanian Magpies team that won the ANL title. In 2018 and 2019 Rainbow served as a training partner for Collingwood Magpies.

== Early life and education ==
Rainbow is originally from Winnaleah, Tasmania. Between 2011 and 2014 she attended Scotch Oakburn College and between 2015 and 2017 she attended Monash University where she studied nutritional science. In 2012 she represented Tasmania as an under-18 cross country runner. In December 2012, Rainbow finished 10th in the Intermediate Australian Schools Knockout National Final 800 metres in a time of 2:27.58.

== Playing career ==
=== Cavaliers ===
Rainbow played for Cavaliers, a Launceston-based team in the Tasmanian Netball League. In both 2011 and 2012 she was named in the TNL Under-19 All Star Teams and in 2013 she was named in the TNL Open All Star Team.

=== Victorian Netball League ===
Between 2015 and 2017, while attending Monash University, Rainbow also played for Monash University Storm in the Victorian Netball League. Since 2018 she has played in the VNL for Melbourne University Lightning.

=== Australian Netball League ===
Victorian Fury

In 2016 Rainbow was called up as a replacement player for Victorian Fury. She was subsequently included in the 2017 Fury squad. While a member of the Fury squad she also served as a training partner with Melbourne Vixens.

Tasmanian Magpies

In 2018 Rainbow began playing for Tasmanian Magpies. Together with Melissa Bragg, Gabrielle Sinclair and Cody Lange, Rainbow was a member of the Magpies team that won the 2018 Australian Netball League title. She was subsequently included in the 2019 and 2020 Tasmanian Magpies squads.

=== Collingwood Magpies ===
In 2018 and 2019 Rainbow served as a training partner for Collingwood Magpies. On 29 March 2018 she made her senior debut for Collingwood Magpies during the Tasmanian Netball Invitational Series at the Silverdome in Launceston.

=== National team ===
Rainbow was included in an advance Australia squad for the 2017 Netball World Youth Cup.

== Honours ==
Tasmanian Magpies

- Australian Netball League
  - Winners: 2018: 1
