= Fiona Themann =

Scotland netball international

Personal information
- Full name: Fiona Isobel Fowler (Née: Themann)
- Born: 18 April 1990 (age 36) Shepparton; Victoria, Australia
- Occupation: Teacher/Netball coach
- Height: 1.85 m (6 ft 1 in)
- School: Caulfield Grammar School
- University: Victoria University

Netball career
- Playing positions: GK, GD, WD
Years	Club team	Apps
200x–2008	Kyabram	
2006-2008	Melbourne Phoenix	
2008–2009	Canberra Darters	
2010–	Melbourne University Lightning	
2010–2012	→ Maldon	
2012	→ Territory Storm	
2015	→ Strathfieldsaye	
2016	→ Newbridge	
2013–2016	Victorian Fury	
2016–2018	Adelaide Thunderbirds	
Years	National team	Caps
2014–	Scotland	

Fiona Themann (born 18 April 1990), also known as Fiona Fowler, is a Scotland netball international. She represented Scotland at the 2014 and 2018 Commonwealth Games and at the 2015 Netball World Cup. At club level, she has played for Melbourne Phoenix in the Commonwealth Bank Trophy, Melbourne University Lightning in the Victorian Netball League, Victorian Fury in the Australian Netball League and for Adelaide Thunderbirds in Suncorp Super Netball. She captained Fury when they won ANL premierships in 2015 and 2016. In 2016 she helped three different teams win league titles. In addition to captaining Fury, she also helped Lightning win the VNL Championship and Newbridge win the LVFNL premiership.

== Early life and education ==
Themann was born in Shepparton, Victoria, Australia and was raised in the nearby town of Mooroopna. Between 2006 and 2007 she attended Caulfield Grammar School. Between 2008 and 2011 she attended Victoria University where she gained a BEd in Health and Physical Education.

== Playing career ==
=== Victorian leagues ===
Themann began playing netball aged 10 in Mooroopna. She eventually began playing for clubs in local Victorian leagues, including Kyabram in the Goulburn Valley Football Netball League. Throughout her senior playing career, Themann would continue to play in local leagues. Between 2010 and 2012 she played for Maldon in the Maryborough Castlemaine District Football Netball League. In 2015 she played for Strathfieldsaye in the Bendigo Football Netball League. In 2016 she was a member of the Newbridge team that won the Loddon Valley Football Netball League premiership.

=== Melbourne Phoenix ===
Between 2006 and 2008, while still attending Caulfield Grammar School, Themann played for Melbourne Phoenix in the Commonwealth Bank Trophy.

=== Melbourne University Lightning ===
In 2010 Themann began play for Melbourne University Lightning in the Victorian Netball League. When she started playing for the team they were known as VU-Western Lightning. In 2012, together with Brooke Thompson, she was a member of the Lightning team that finished as runners up in the VNL. In 2016, together with Shannon Eagland and Elle Bennetts, she was a member of the Lightning team that won the VNL Championship. In 2020 Themann returned to Lightning following pregnancy.

=== Australian Netball League ===
Themann has played for three different teams in the Australian Netball League. In 2008 she played for Canberra Darters and in 2012 had a second spell in the ANL with Territory Storm. Between 2013 and 2016 Themann played for Victorian Fury. She a member of the Fury team that won the 2013 ANL title. She subsequently captained Fury when they won further titles in 2015 and 2016.

=== Adelaide Thunderbirds ===
In 2016 Themann signed for Adelaide Thunderbirds of the Suncorp Super Netball. She attracted the attention of several senior teams following her performances for Scotland at the 2015 Netball World Cup. However, having declared for Scotland, she was reclassified as an import player and in 2015 a deal to sign for Queensland Firebirds collapsed as a result. However a second opportunity for Themann to play at a senior level came in 2016 when Dan Ryan signed her for Thunderbirds. Themann subsequently played for Thunderbirds during the 2017 and 2018 seasons.

=== International ===
Australia

Themann represented Australia at under-16 and under-19 levels.

Scotland

In 2013 Themann declared for Scotland. She was eligible to play for Scotland because her father was Scottish. In April 2014 she made her debut for Scotland during a home series against Trinidad and Tobago. She subsequently represented Scotland at the 2014 and 2018 Commonwealth Games and at the 2015 Netball World Cup. She helped Scotland qualify for the 2019 Netball World Cup but missed the tournament itself because of pregnancy.

Tournaments	Place
2014 Commonwealth Games	9th
2015 Netball Europe Open Championships	6th
2015 Netball World Cup	12th
2019 Netball World Cup Regional Qualifier – Europe	1st
2018 Commonwealth Games	9th

== Teacher and coach ==
In 2012 Themann began working as a primary school teacher at Flemington Primary School. When playing for Adelaide Thunderbirds she took two years unpaid leave. While playing for Thunderbirds, she also worked as a netball coach at Pedare Christian College and as a teacher, coach and mentor at the South Australian Aboriginal Sports Training Academy (SAASTA). In 2020 she became a netball coach at the Maribyrnong Sports Academy.

== Honours ==
Victorian Fury

- Australian Netball League
  - Winners: 2013, 2015, 2016: 3

Melbourne University Lightning

- Victorian Netball League
  - Winners: 2016: 1
  - Runners up: 2012: 1
