= Brooke Thompson =

Australian netball player

Personal information
- Full name: Brooke Thompson
- Born: 27 April 1984 (age 42)
- Occupation: PE Teacher
- Height: 1.80 m (5 ft 11 in)

Netball career
- Playing positions: GD, GK, WD
Years	Club team	Apps
199x–200x	Melton	
2004–2005	AIS Canberra Darters	
2007	Melbourne Kestrels	
2008–2009	Victorian Fury	
2009–2010	Melbourne Vixens	
2012–2014	VU-Western Lightning	
2012–2014	Melton	

Brooke Thompson (born 27 April 1984) is a former Australian netball player. She was a member of the Melbourne Vixens team that won the 2009 ANZ Championship. She was also a member of the Victorian Fury teams that won the 2008 and 2009 Australian Netball League titles. During the Commonwealth Bank Trophy era, Thompson played for AIS Canberra Darters and Melbourne Kestrels.

== Playing career ==
=== Commonwealth Bank Trophy ===
During the 2004 and 2005 seasons, Thompson played for AIS Canberra Darters in the Commonwealth Bank Trophy. During the 2007 season she played for Melbourne Kestrels

=== Victorian Fury ===
Thompson was a member of the Victorian Fury teams that won the 2008 and 2009 Australian Netball League titles. She was a prominent member of the undefeated 2008 squad but played only a handful of games in 2009 as she also a member of the Melbourne Vixens squad.

=== Melbourne Vixens ===
Thompson was a member of the Melbourne Vixens team that won the 2009 ANZ Championship. She was also a member of the Vixens 2010 squad.

=== VU Western Lightning ===
In 2012 Thompson captained the VU-Western Lightning team that reached the Victorian Netball League grand final. Her team mates included Fiona Themann and Melissa Bragg. She continued to play for Lightning until she retired from her playing career in 2014.

=== Melton ===
Between 2012 and 2014 Thompson played for Melton in the Ballarat Football Netball League. She had previously played for Melton as a junior at the start of her playing career. In 2012 and 2013 she was named the league's best and fairest player. In 2014 Thompson was named grand final MVP as Melton won their first senior BFNL title in thirteen years, defeating Sunbury 48–33 in the final. On receiving the award, Thompson announced that it would be her final game. Thompson was diagnosed with ovarian cancer a week before the grand final.

=== National team ===
Between 2001 and 2005, Thompson represented Australia at under-17, under-19 and under-21 levels.
