= Canberra Darters =

Defunct Australian netball team

- Founded: 2003 2022
- Disbanded: 2016
- Based in: Canberra
- Region: Australian Capital Territory
- Home venue: AIS Arena; SolarHub ACT Netball Centre
- League: Commonwealth Bank Trophy; Australian Netball League
Uniform
Uniform

Canberra Darters are a former Australian netball team based in Canberra, Australian Capital Territory. The team was originally formed as a partnership between the Australian Institute of Sport and Netball ACT. Between 2003 and 2007 they played in the Commonwealth Bank Trophy as AIS Canberra Darters. The AIS and Netball ACT subsequently entered separate teams in the Australian Netball League. Canberra Darters were the Netball ACT team in the ANL between 2008 and 2016. In 2017 they were replaced in the ANL by Canberra Giants.

== History ==
=== Commonwealth Bank Trophy ===
AIS Canberra Darters was originally formed as a partnership between the Australian Institute of Sport and Netball ACT. They subsequently entered a combined team in the Commonwealth Bank Trophy. They joined the competition in 2003, replacing Adelaide Ravens. They continued to play in this competition until its demise in 2007. Their best performance came in 2004 when they finished 5th.

Regular season stats

Season	Position	Won	Lost	Drawn
2003	6th	5	9	0
2004	5th	4	10	0
2005	7th	2	12	0
2006	8th	0	14	0
2007	8th	1	13	0

=== Australian Netball League ===
The AIS and Netball ACT subsequently entered separate teams in the Australian Netball League with the Netball ACT team continuing to use the Canberra Darters name. Darters played in the ANL between 2008 and 2016. In 2017 they were replaced in the ANL by Canberra Giants.

Regular season stats

Season	Position
2008	
2009	9th
2010	
2011	
2012	
2013	11th
2014	9th
2015	7th
2016	6th

== Home venues ==
Darters played their home games at the AIS Arena and the SolarHub ACT Netball Centre.

== Notable former players ==
=== Internationals ===
Australia

- Natalie Avellino
- Kate Beveridge
- Rebecca Bulley
- Carla Dziwoki
- Susan Fuhrmann
- Laura Geitz
- Kimberlee Green
- Sharni Layton
- Caitlyn Nevins
- Lauren Nourse
- Susan Pratley

Scotland

- Hayley Mulheron
- Fiona Themann

=== Commonwealth Bank Trophy ===
- Karyn Bailey
- Emily Beaton
- Kirby Bentley
- Kate Beveridge
- Rebecca Bulley
- Carla Dziwoki
- Mandy Edwards
- Bianca Franklin
- Susan Fuhrmann
- Laura Geitz
- Kimberlee Green
- Josie Janz-Dawson
- Jasmine Keene
- Emma Koster
- Janelle Lawson
- Sharni Layton
- Samantha May
- Clare McMeniman
- Kirby Mutton
- Chelsey Nash
- Lauren Nourse
- Susan Pratley
- Bianca Reddy
- Laura Scherian
- Leah Shoard
- Joanna Sutton
- Brooke Thompson

=== Australian Netball League ===
- Jasmine Keene
- Hayley Mulheron
- Caitlyn Strachan
- Fiona Themann

== Head coaches ==
Coach	Years
Norma Plummer	2003
Michelle Wilkins	2003–2005
Brenda Scherian	2006
Simone McKinnis	2007
Melinda Clarke	2010–2016
Marji Parr	2022-
