= Maddie Hay =

Australian netball player

Personal information
- Born: 11 April 1995 (age 31) Sydney, New South Wales, Australia
- Height: 1.85 m (6 ft 1 in)
- School: Cronulla High School

Netball career
- Playing positions: C, WD, WA
Years	Club team	Apps
2020–2025	Giants Netball	

Maddie Hay (born 11 April 1995) is an Australian netball player in the Suncorp Super Netball league, playing for Giants Netball.

Hay played netball and represented New South Wales and Australia at various underage levels. She was a training partner at Giants Netball in 2018/19, though she earned her debut in Round 1 of the 2019 season, briefly coming onto the court to replace an injured player. That was her only appearance for the Giants at Super Netball level that season, and she played most of the season for Canberra Giants in the Australian Netball League. The Giants signed Hay as a senior player for the 2020 season.
