= Giants Netball Reserves =

Australian Netball League team

GIANTS Netball Reserves
- Founded: 2016
- Based in: Greater Western Sydney
- Regions: New South Wales
- Home venue: Ken Rosewall Arena
- Head coach: Rebecca Bulley
- Premierships: 0
- League: Super Netball Reserves
- Website: giantsnetball.com.au
Uniform

The GIANTS Netball Reserves, formerly the GIANTS Netball Academy and the Canberra GIANTS, are an Australian netball team that represents Netball New South Wales in the Super Netball Reserves competition. The GIANTS Reserves is the reserve team of Suncorp Super Netball club, GIANTS Netball. The team is made up of selected stand-out players from Netball NSW Premier League, GIANTS Netball training partners and some contracted GIANTS Netball players.

Under the Canberra GIANTS name, the team reached the 2018 Australian Netball League grand final, and finished runner-up.

== History ==
=== Canberra Giants ===
In late 2016, Netball ACT, Netball New South Wales and GIANTS Netball formed a partnership in order to enter a team in the Australian Netball League. The Canberra GIANTS subsequently replaced Canberra Darters as Netball ACT's ANL franchise. Between 2017 and 2019, Giants played in the ANL. With a team captained by Taylah Davies and featuring Maddie Hay, Teigan O'Shannassy and Amy Parmenter, Giants reached the 2018 ANL grand final but lost to Tasmanian Magpies by 1 goal.

=== GIANTS Netball Academy ===
In September 2019, it was announced that Netball ACT, Netball New South Wales and Giants Netball had ended their partnership, and that Netball ACT and Giants Netball would enter separate teams in the Australian Netball League from 2020. Netball New South Wales and GIANTS Netball subsequently launched the GIANTS Netball Academy.

=== GIANTS Netball Reserves ===
To align with Netball Australia's rebranding of the Australian Netball Championships (ANC) to Super Netball Reserves in 2025, the GIANTS Netball Academy was rebranded to the GIANTS Netball Reserves. This new format of the competition ran alongside the Suncorp Super Netball season, with games taking place alongside the GIANTS games, usually pre- or post-SSN match at the same venue, or alternatively the day before or after an SSN match at a different venue.

== Grand finals ==
Season	Winners	Score	Runners up	Venue
2018	Tasmanian Magpies	54–53	Canberra GIANTS	AIS Arena

== Notable players ==
=== 2026 squad ===
2026 GIANTS Netball Reserves roster
Players
Coaches

Name	Pos	DOB	Height	Club	Nat	Caps
Jamie Podmore-Taylor (c)	WD, C		–	UTS Randwick Sparks	(Australia)
Marley Aplin	WA, C		–	ERNA Hawks	(Australia)
Eva Carneiro (Note: Training partner for GIANTS Netball)	GK, GD		–	Sutherland Stingrays	(Australia)
Eloise Egan	GK, GD		–	Manly Warringah Sapphires	(Australia)
Matilda Fanning	WD, C		–	Sutherland Stingrays	(Australia)
Olivia Harris	GS, GA		–	North Shore United	(Australia)
Ellie Hart	GA, GS		–	ERNA Hawks	(Australia)
Audrey Little (vc)	WA, C		–	Manly Warringah Sapphires	(Australia)
Kelis Ogle	GK, WD, GD		–	South West Mounties Magic	(Australia)
Monika ‘Otai	GA, GS		–	UTS Randwick Sparks	(Australia)
Matilda Percival	GA, GS		–	North Shore United	(Australia)
Dakota Thomas	WD, GD		–	Sutherland Stingrays	(Australia)
Skye Thompson	GA, WA		–	Sutherland Stingrays	(Australia)
Violet Wetsteyn	GD, GK		–	North Shore United	(Australia)

Head coach

- Rebecca Bulley

Assistant coach

- Amber Cross

Notes

- (c) – Captain
- (cc) – Co-captain
- (vc) – Vice-captain
- – Injury / maternity leave
- (TRP) – Temporary Replacement Player
Player profiles: Team website
Last updated: 27 April 2026

=== Internationals ===
Australia

- Kiera Austin
- Sophie Dwyer
- Amy Parmenter

New Zealand

- Gina Crampton

=== Giants Netball ===
- Kiera Austin
- Gina Crampton
- Taylah Davies
- Jemma Donoghue
- Sophie Dwyer
- Angelina Frketic
- Maddie Hay
- Matisse Letherbarrow
- Matilda McDonell
- Lauren Moore
- Erin O'Brien
- Teigan O'Shannassy
- Amy Parmenter
- Amy Sligar
- Skye Thompson
- Hope White

== Head coaches ==
Coach	Years
Sharyn Hill / Maria Lynch	2017–2018
Melinda Clarke	2019
Rebecca Bulley	2020, 2025-present
Ali Tucker-Munro	2021-2022
Jenny O'Keeffe	2023-2024

== Premierships ==
- Australian Netball League
  - Runners up: 2018
