= Lara Dunkley =

Australian netball player (born 1995)

Personal information
- Born: 31 May 1995 (age 31) Sydney, Australia
- Height: 1.80 m (5 ft 11 in)
- School: Gippsland Grammar School
- University: Federation University Australia

Netball career
- Playing positions: C, WD, WA
Years	Club team	Apps
2019	Melbourne Vixens	
2020–present	Queensland Firebirds	

Lara Dunkley (born 31 May 1995) is an Australian netball player in the Suncorp Super Netball league, playing for the Queensland Firebirds.

Dunkley began her elite netball career with the Melbourne Vixens in the mid 2010s, playing for the club's reserves team the Victorian Fury in the Australian Netball League (ANL), where she captained the team in the 2018 season. She was elevated to the Vixens' senior list for the 2019 Suncorp Super Netball season, replacing the long-term injured Tayla Honey.

After leaving the Vixens, Dunkley was signed as a temporary replacement player for the 2020 Suncorp Super Netball season by the Queensland Firebirds.

Dunkley was born in Sydney but grew up in the small Victorian town of Yarram from the age of seven. She is the sibling of Brisbane Lions AFL footballer Josh and former Melbourne AFL player Kyle. Her father is former Sydney Swans player Andrew. Off the court Dunkley has completed a Bachelor of Education where she works as a substitute teacher and netball coach at various schools and netball organisations. She works for a school in South Brisbane named St Laurnece's College. Her position at the school is being The Head of the sports excellence program.
