= EUFC =

EUFC may refer to:

- Ebbsfleet United F.C.
- Eccleshill United F.C.
- Echuca United Football Club
- Evergreen United F.C.
- Evesham United F.C.
