= Vixens Academy =

Australian Netball League team

- Founded: 2008
- Based in: Melbourne
- Regions: Victoria, Australia
- Home venue: State Netball Hockey Centre
- Head coach: Di Honey
- Premierships: 8 (2008, 2009, 2010, 2013, 2014, 2015, 2016, 2019)
- League: Australian Netball League
- Website: vic.netball.com.au
Uniform
Uniform

Vixens Academy are an Australian netball team that represents Netball Victoria in the Australian Netball Championships. In 2008 they were both founding members and the inaugural champions of the league. They retained the title in 2009 and completed a three in row in 2010. They then won it four times in a row between 2013 and 2016. In 2019 they won their eighth ANL title. They are the most successful team in the ANL. The Team are effectively the representative team of the Victorian Netball League and the reserve team of Melbourne Vixens.

== History ==
=== Netball Victoria ===
Victorian Fury is effectively the representative team of the Victorian Netball League. They are also one of two teams that represent Netball Victoria in senior or national leagues. Their senior team, Melbourne Vixens, have represented Netball Victoria in both the ANZ Championship and Suncorp Super Netball. In 2013 and 2014 Netball Victoria also entered a second team known as Victorian Flames in the Australian Netball League.

In 2016 Fury and Vixens began to host double headers against other ANL and ANZ Championship teams. This was part of a process where the relationship between the two leagues became more formalized. As part of this arrangement, a limited number of Vixens players were also eligible to play for Fury.

=== Three in a row ===
In 2008 Victorian Fury were both founder members and the inaugural champions of the Australian Netball League. Chelsey Nash captained Fury to their first title. In 2009 Fury retained the title and in 2010 they completed a three in a row. Other members of the Fury team from this era included Kathleen Knott and Karyn Bailey.

=== Four in a row ===
Between 2013 and 2016 Fury completed a four in a row of ANL titles. Mwai Kumwenda was the top goalscorer for Fury during 2013, finishing the season with a record 461 goals. In the grand final against NSW Waratahs she scored 38 goals with a 97% strike rate. She was subsequently named the ANL's MVP. In 2015 Jo Weston, Kelsey Browne, Alice Teague-Neeld and Elle Bennetts were all members of the Fury team captained by Fiona Themann that won the ANL title for a sixth time. In 2016 Themann, again captain, and Bennetts were joined by Tayla Honey, Lara Dunkley and Shannon Eagland as Fury won their seventh title.

== ANL Grand finals ==
Season	Winners	Score	Runners up	Venue
2008	Victorian Fury	56–41	Australian Institute of Sport	Sydney
2009	Victorian Fury	46–32	Australian Institute of Sport	BCEC
2010	Victorian Fury	54–47	NNSW Waratahs	Waverley Netball Centre
2011	NNSW Waratahs	55–46	Victorian Fury	Waverley Netball Centre
2013	Victorian Fury	56–51	NNSW Waratahs	Netball SA Stadium
2014	Victorian Fury	51–49	Queensland Fusion	Waverley Netball Centre
2015	Victorian Fury	58–46	Southern Force	Waverley Netball Centre
2016	Victorian Fury	53–46	NNSW Waratahs	Netball Central
2017	Western Sting	63–47	Victorian Fury	Perth State Netball Centre
2019	Victorian Fury	54–53	NNSW Waratahs	SNHC

== Home venues ==
Vixens Academy play the majority of their home games at the State Netball and Hockey Centre. They have also played home games at Melbourne Arena and the Margaret Court Arena.

== Notable players ==
=== Internationals ===
Australia

- Kelsey Browne
- Kate Moloney
- Caitlyn Nevins
- Tegan Philip
- Jo Weston

Malawi

- Mwai Kumwenda

Scotland

- Fiona Themann

=== Melbourne Vixens ===
- Karyn Bailey
- Kelsey Browne
- Lara Dunkley
- Shannon Eagland
- Kate Eddy
- Tayla Honey
- Kathleen Knott
- Mwai Kumwenda
- Kate Moloney
- Chelsey Nash
- Caitlyn Nevins
- Alice Teague-Neeld
- Brooke Thompson
- Jo Weston

=== Collingwood Magpies ===
- Melissa Bragg
- Kelsey Browne
- Molly Jovic
- Kelsie Rainbow
- Alice Teague-Neeld

=== MVPs ===
ANL MVP

The following Victorian Fury players were named MVP in the Australian Netball League.

Season	Player
2009	Kathleen Knott
2011	Karyn Bailey
2013	Mwai Kumwenda
2018	Rahni Samason
2019	Emma Ryde

Victorian Fury MVP

Season	Player
2010	Kathleen Knott
2011	Karyn Bailey
2012	Kathleen Knott
2013	Mwai Kumwenda
2014	Jo Weston
2015	Kelsey Browne
2016	Ella Bayliss
2017	Kate Thompson
2018	Rahni Samason
2019	Emma Ryde

== Head coaches ==
Coach	Years
Cathy Fellows	2011–2012
Stacey West	2013
Kristy Keppich-Birrell	2014–2015
Cathy Fellows	2016
Leesa Gallard	2017–2018
Di Honey	2019–

== Premierships ==
- Australian Netball League
  - Winners: 2008, 2009, 2010, 2013, 2014, 2015, 2016, 2019: 8
  - Runners up: 2011, 2017: 2
