= Erin Hoare =

Australian netball player

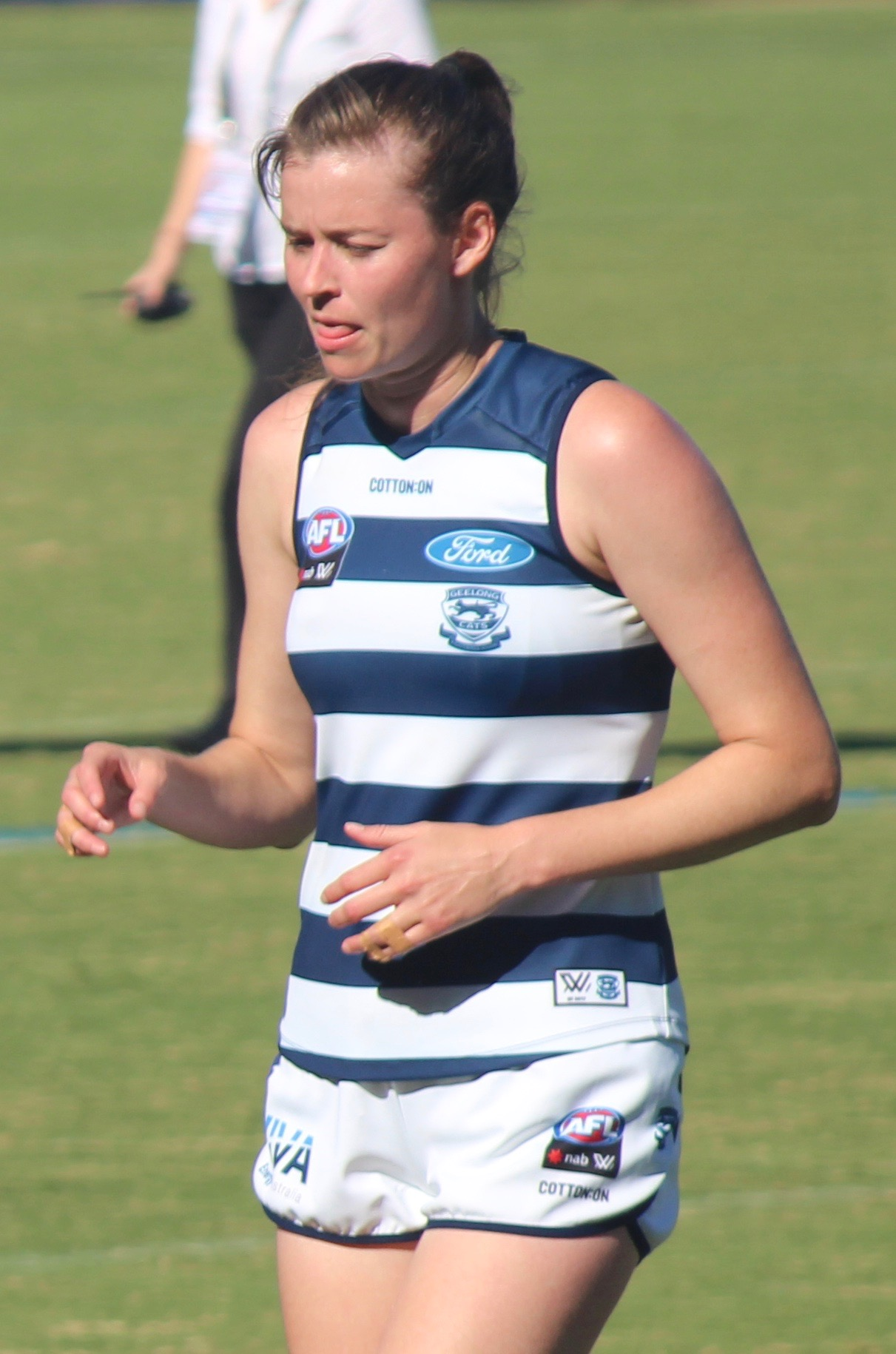
- Hoare playing Australian rules football for Geelong in 2019
- Born: 17 June 1989 (age 37); Victoria, Australia
- Netball career
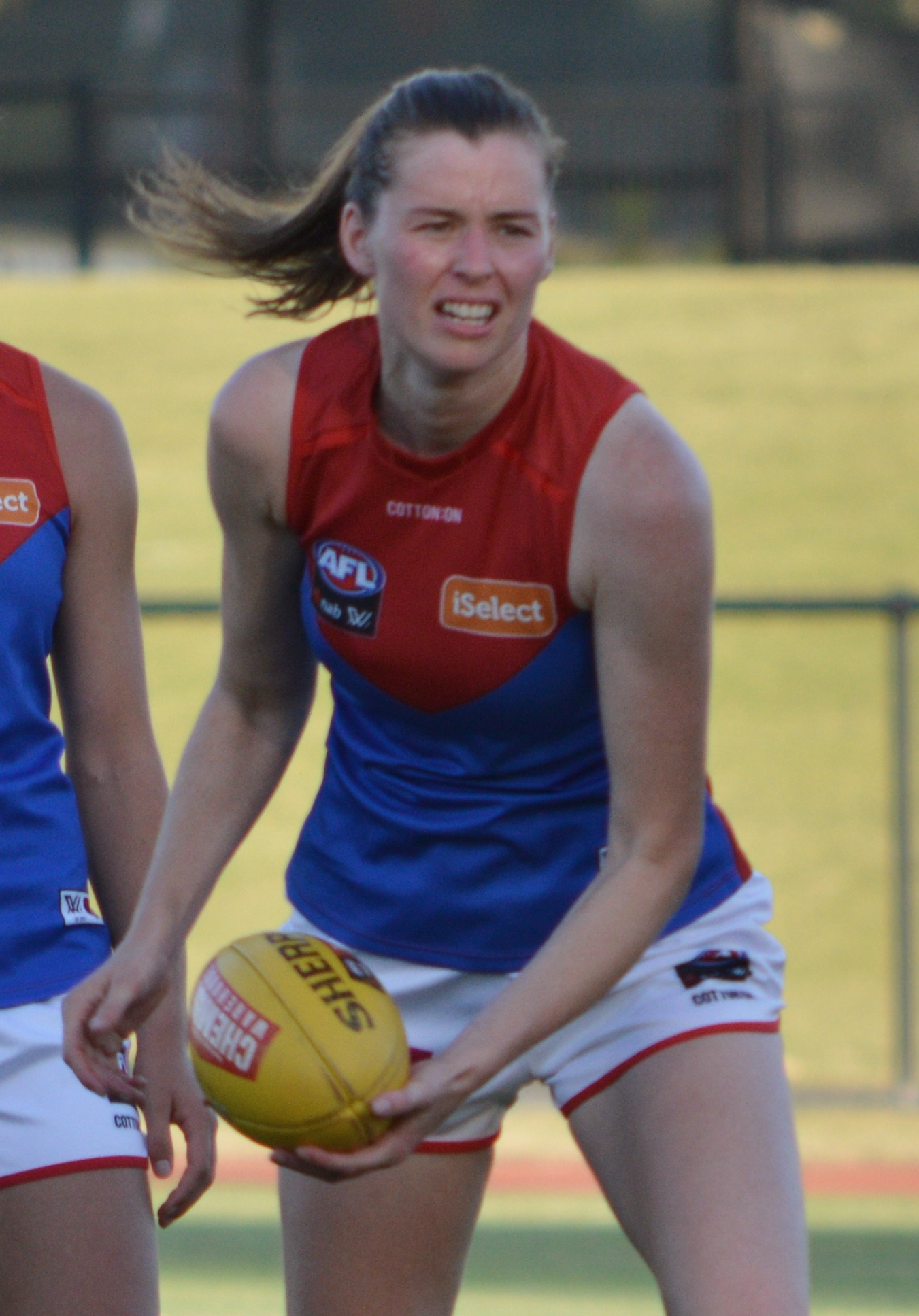
- Height: 194 cm (6 ft 4 in)
- Playing positions: GS, GA
Years	Club team	Apps
2013–2014	Melbourne Vixens	2
2015	New South Wales Swifts	3
- Updated on 17:31, 21 December 2023 (UTC)
Australian rules football career
Personal information
- Height: 194 cm (6 ft 4 in)
- Position: Ruck
Club information
- Current club: Geelong
- Number: 46
Playing career^{1}
Years	Club	Games (Goals)
2018	Melbourne	4 (0)
2019; 2023	Geelong	19 (0)
Total		23 (0)
- ^{1} Playing statistics correct to the end of the 2023 season.

Erin Hoare (born 17 July 1989) is an Australian academic and a former professional Australian rules footballer who last played for the Geelong Football Club.

A former national level netballer, Hoare was primarily a goal shooter, but also played goal attack.

== Netball career ==
Beginning her career with the Melbourne Vixens in 2013, Hoare was primarily a bench player, earning two ANZ Championship caps during her time at the club. In 2014, Hoare with the Melbourne Vixens won the ANZ Championship premiership.

At the end of the 2014 ANZ Championship season, it was announced that Hoare would be leaving the Melbourne Vixens to join the NSW Swifts for the 2015 ANZ Championship season. Hoare joined Caitlin Thwaites, Susan Pratley and Stephanie Wood as the shooters for the NSW Swifts. At 194 cm, Hoare was the tallest of the NSW Swifts shooters and one of the tallest players in the ANZ Championship.

=== Accolades ===
- 2013 Melbourne Vixens Coaches' Award
- 2013-14 Australian Netball League Premiers (with Victorian Fury)
- 2014 ANZ Championship Premiers (with Melbourne Vixens)
- 2012 Victorian Fury ANL team
- 2012 Victorian Netball League Team of the Year
- 2012 Geelong Cougars Best and Fairest

== Australian rules football ==
Hoare first played football in 2017 with Geelong in the VFL Women's competition. Later that year she signed a rookie contract with Melbourne to play in the AFL Women's competition in 2018.

In May 2018 Hoare accepted an offer from expansion club Geelong to play with the club in the 2019 AFLW season.

Hoare announced her retirement from the AFLW following the 2019 season.

In April 2023, Hoare was drafted by Geelong as the first selection in the 2023 AFL Women's supplementary draft. She is the tallest player in the history of the AFL Women's competition at 194 cm (6 ft 4 in), and returns to the league after continuing her studies at Cambridge University (where she played with the Cambridge University Australian Rules Football Club) and having two children.

In June 2024, on the eve of the 2024 AFL Women's season, Hoare announced her immediate retirement from football.

== Academic career ==
Hoare completed her PhD in Public Health/Psychology at Deakin University in 2016, and has worked as Australian Rotary Postdoctoral Research Fellow at the WHO Collaborating Centre for Obesity Prevention at Deakin University and the Baker Heart and Diabetes Institute, in Victoria, Australia. She has published a number of papers on epidemiology of lifestyle factors for physical and mental health outcomes using large datasets, especially relating to adolescents, depression and obesity in Australia.
