= Jasmine Keene =

Australian netball player

Personal information
- Born: 14 January 1987 (age 39) Perth, Western Australia
- Height: 1.91 m (6 ft 3 in)
- Relative: Laurie Keene (father)

Netball career
- Playing positions: GS, GA
Years	Club team	Apps
2006	Perth Orioles	
2007	AIS Canberra Darters	
2009	West Coast Fever	
2010	Adelaide Thunderbirds	
- Updated on 6 April 2011

Jasmine Keene (born 14 January 1987 in Perth, Western Australia) is an Australian netball player, primarily in the position of goal shooter. She is the daughter of Australian rules football player Laurie Keene, who played for the West Coast Eagles.

Jasmine Keene debuted in the Commonwealth Bank Trophy for the Perth Orioles in 2006, before transferring to the AIS Canberra Darters the following year. Keene was not signed for the inaugural season of the ANZ Championship, but returned to Perth in 2009 to play with the West Coast Fever.

In 2010 she moved again to the Adelaide Thunderbirds. Keene played only one quarter against the Central Pulse, although the Thunderbirds went on to win the 2010 Championship title. She was initially re-signed for the Thunderbirds' 2011 campaign, but was dropped from the team less than three weeks before the start of the season. She now plays netball in the Australian Netball League for Canberra Darters.
