= Parkville Stadium =

Sports venue in Melbourne, Australia

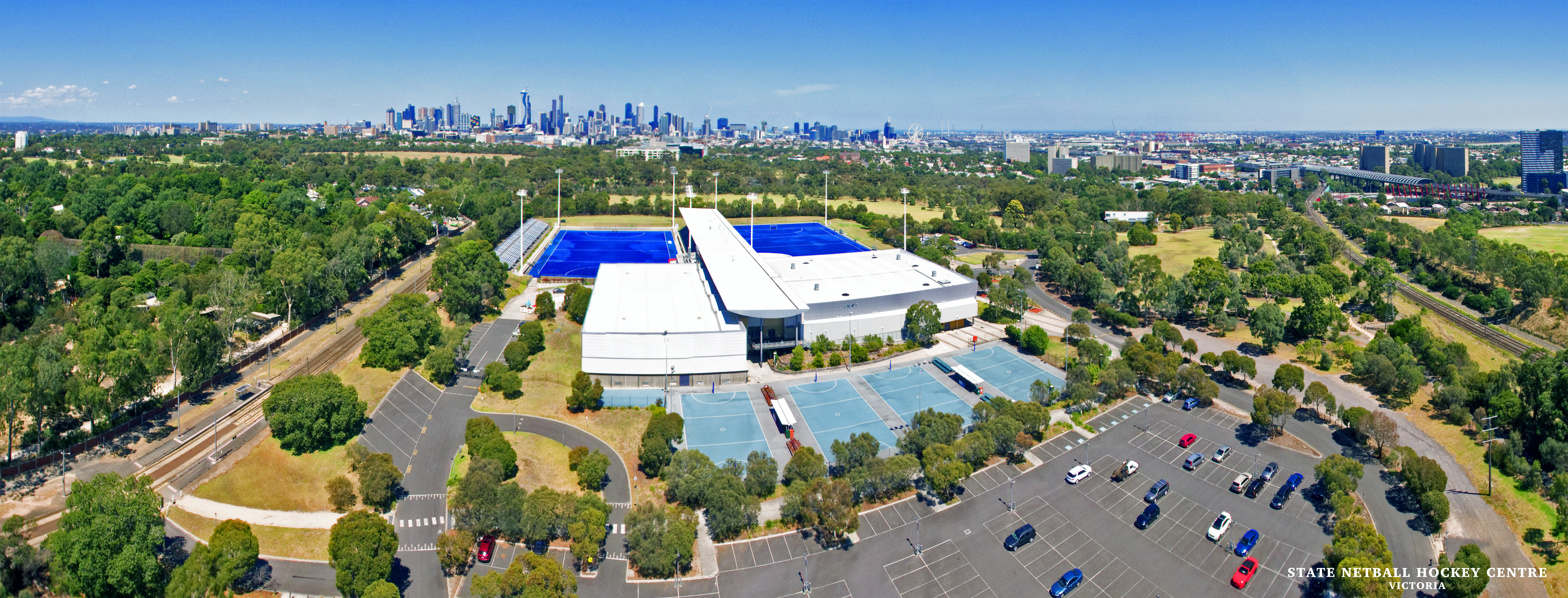
- Aerial view of the facility in 2017
- Interactive map of Parkville Stadium
- Former names: State Netball & Hockey Centre
- Location: 10 Brens Drive, Royal Park, Parkville, Victoria
- Coordinates: 37°47′9″S 144°56′53″E
- Owner: Victorian Government
- Operator: State Sport Centres Trust
- Capacity: Netball: 3,050; Basketball: 3,500; Field hockey: 8,000

Construction
- Groundbreaking: March 1999
- Opened: 16 March 2001
- Cost: $27 million

Tenants
- Hockey Victoria Vikings (AHL) (2001–18); HC Melbourne (HO) (2019–present) Basketball Melbourne United (NBL) (2002–2017) Melbourne Boomers (WNBL) (2021–2024) Netball Melbourne Vixens (ANZ) (2008–2011) (Note: Used by the club for one-off matches in 2013 and 2019.); Melbourne Phoenix (CBT) (2001–2008); Melbourne Kestrels (CBT) (2001–2008); Victorian Men's and Mixed Netball Association Other Tenants 2006 Commonwealth Games

Parkville Stadium, also referred to as Melbourne Sports Centres – Parkville and previously known as the State Netball & Hockey Centre, is a multipurpose sporting facility located in Melbourne, Australia. It is the administrative headquarters for both Netball Victoria and Hockey Victoria and features two outdoor hockey fields and eleven indoor netball courts, with the main hockey field capable of seating up to 8,000 and the main Netball court seating up to 3,050 spectators. National Basketball League club Melbourne United played home matches at the venue in the past, as well as Super Netball team Melbourne Vixens, though both clubs have shifted home matches to larger-capacity arenas. Hockey Club Melbourne of the Hockey One league play home games on the main hockey pitch.

The facility, opened on 16 March 2001, is located in Royal Park, Parkville next to the Melbourne Zoo. The facility is run by the State Sport Centres Trust, which operates four other sporting facilities in Melbourne, namely the Melbourne Sports and Aquatic Centre (MSAC), the MSAC Institute of Training (MIT) and Lakeside Stadium.

== History ==
The development of the facility dates back to 1996 when the Royal Park Master Plan was prepared by the City of Melbourne. Under the plan the existing State Netball Centre would be demolished and integrated with the State Hockey Centre. The demolishing of the State Netball Centre along with a reduction in the number of outdoor courts enabled the reinstatement of parkland and playing fields. The plan also outlined improving amenities for all park users in conjunction with the development of the centre, including improved roads, public transport and car parking.

In May 1998 $24.5 million funding was approved by the Victorian Government, via a project known as the Community Sports Fund. In February 1999 a revised budget of $27 million was accepted after a tender process found that the previous budget was too small, even after reducing the scope of the project. The approval for the centre was fast-tracked so as to allow the venue to be assessed by the 2006 Commonwealth Games Evaluations Panel in mid-1999. The redevelopment of the facilities began in March 1999 and was planned to be completed by April 2000. Construction was completed in November 2000, and the facility was officially opened on 16 March 2001.

The redevelopment of the park was objected to by several interest groups. In May 1999 legal action commenced against the redevelopment of Royal Park, on the grounds that the development was inconsistent with the purpose of Crown land reservations. Another issue was raised after concerns over the effects of the exterior lights on the surround areas, including the nearby Melbourne Zoo.

In March 2019 the centre began undergoing a $64.6 million redevelopment announced earlier by the Victorian Government. The redevelopment replaced the outdoor netball courts with six indoor courts, created an indoor hockey facility, a high-performance gymnasium and the Sports House 2 building, which provides administrative offices for Netball Victoria and Hockey Victoria. The redevelopment concluded in mid-2021.

== Facilities ==
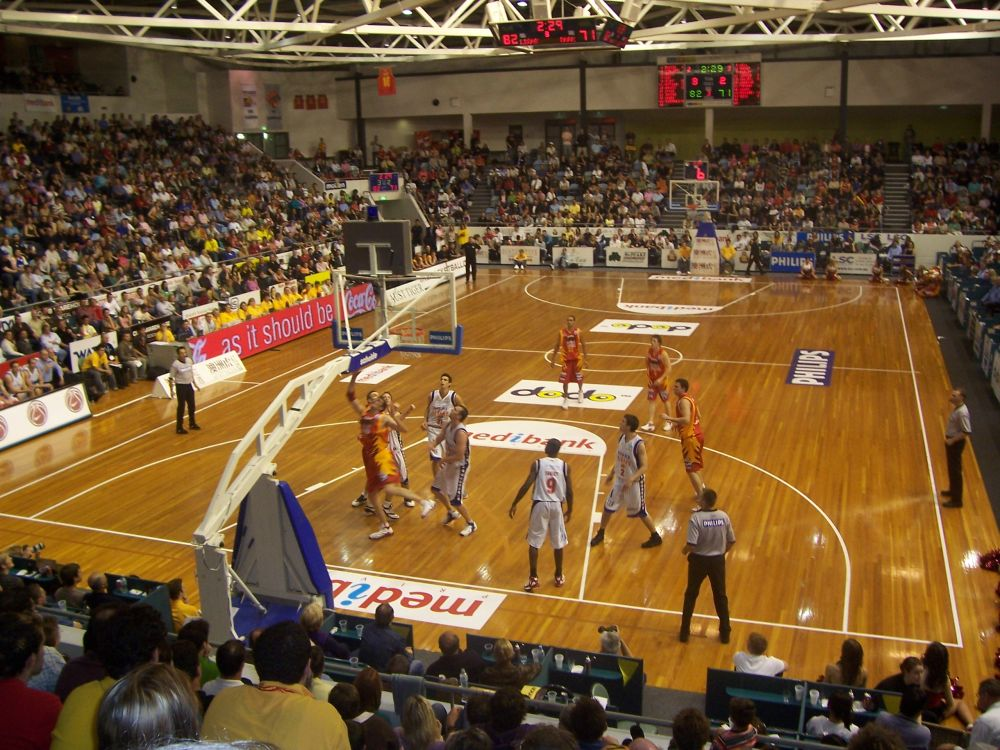
SNHC hosting a basketball match in 2006

The centre has eleven indoor netball courts including two in the main stadium, known as Parkville Arena. The arena has permanent seating on three sides of the courts and retractable seating can be used (covering the second court) to increase the capacity to 3,050. The secondary hall can be configured for 250 spectators. When the main stadium is configured for basketball it has a capacity of 3,500.

The netball courts can be transformed to cater for basketball, volleyball, martial arts, concerts, indoor soccer and other indoor sports.

The centre has two hockey pitches with a grandstand situated between them, providing seating for 1,000 spectators undercover on the main pitch and seating for 250 spectators on the second pitch. The main pitch is surrounded by grassed seating areas which can accommodate temporary seating for up to 8,000 spectators, as has been utilised for past events such as the 2006 Commonwealth Games.

The hockey pitches can be transformed to cater for lacrosse, gridiron, soccer, touch football and other outdoor sports.

== Netball ==
This arena has been used for netball since its opening. It has hosted Victorian Netball League, Australian Netball League, Commonwealth Bank Trophy, ANZ Championship and Victoria Men's and Mixed Netball League (M-League) matches. Past tenants have included Melbourne Phoenix and Melbourne Vixens. The Vixens used the arena throughout 2008 to 2011 and also used it for home finals in 2013 and 2019, on both occasions because their usual venues were unavailable. The venue is the current training location for the Vixens. Victorian Fury play the majority of their home ANL at SNHC.

== Basketball ==
In past National Basketball League seasons, the facility was occasionally used by Melbourne United (formerly the Melbourne Tigers) and was nicknamed 'The Cage'. The club made the centre their home in 2002 due to financial trouble and the high costs of hiring their previous home, Vodafone Arena (Now John Cain Arena).

Over time, the club gradually moved all of their matches to the larger capacity Melbourne Arena located near the city. The Tigers (now United) utilise the facility for home matches if John Cain Arena is unavailable.

The facility co-hosted the FIBA Oceania Championship in 2003 and 2011. Both times, the Australian national basketball team won the gold medal.

== Commonwealth Games ==
For the 2006 Melbourne Commonwealth Games the facility was used for all the hockey games and netball preliminary matches.

== Water conservation ==
As part of an initiative in conjunction with the Commonwealth Games in 2004 the centre received a grant from the Smart Water Trust to recycle water from the hockey pitches and the roof structure. The recycled water substitutes for drinking water to water the hockey pitches and is expected to reduce water usage by 78%.
