= Kathleen Knott =

Australian netball player

Personal information
- Born: 19 September 1987 (age 38)
- Height: 6 ft (183 cm) 1
- Relatives: Julia Knott, Jessica Knott
- School: St Helena

Netball career
- Playing position: GS
Years	Club team	Apps
2009–	Melbourne Vixens	
2007	Melbourne Kestrels	
- City West Falcons
- Updated on 2009-04-25

Kathleen Knott (born 19 September 1987) is an Australian netball player in the ANZ Championship, playing for the Melbourne Vixens. Knott previously played with the Melbourne Kestrels (2007) in the Commonwealth Bank Trophy. Knott was a part of the 2009 Vixens premiership side. She was also a part of the tragic Black Saturday bushfires. She lost so much in the fires, but gained so much in 2009, as a backup shooter to Caitlin Thwaites. She is also a part of the Victorian Fury side, playing in the Australian Netball League.
