= Elle Bennetts =

Australian rules footballer

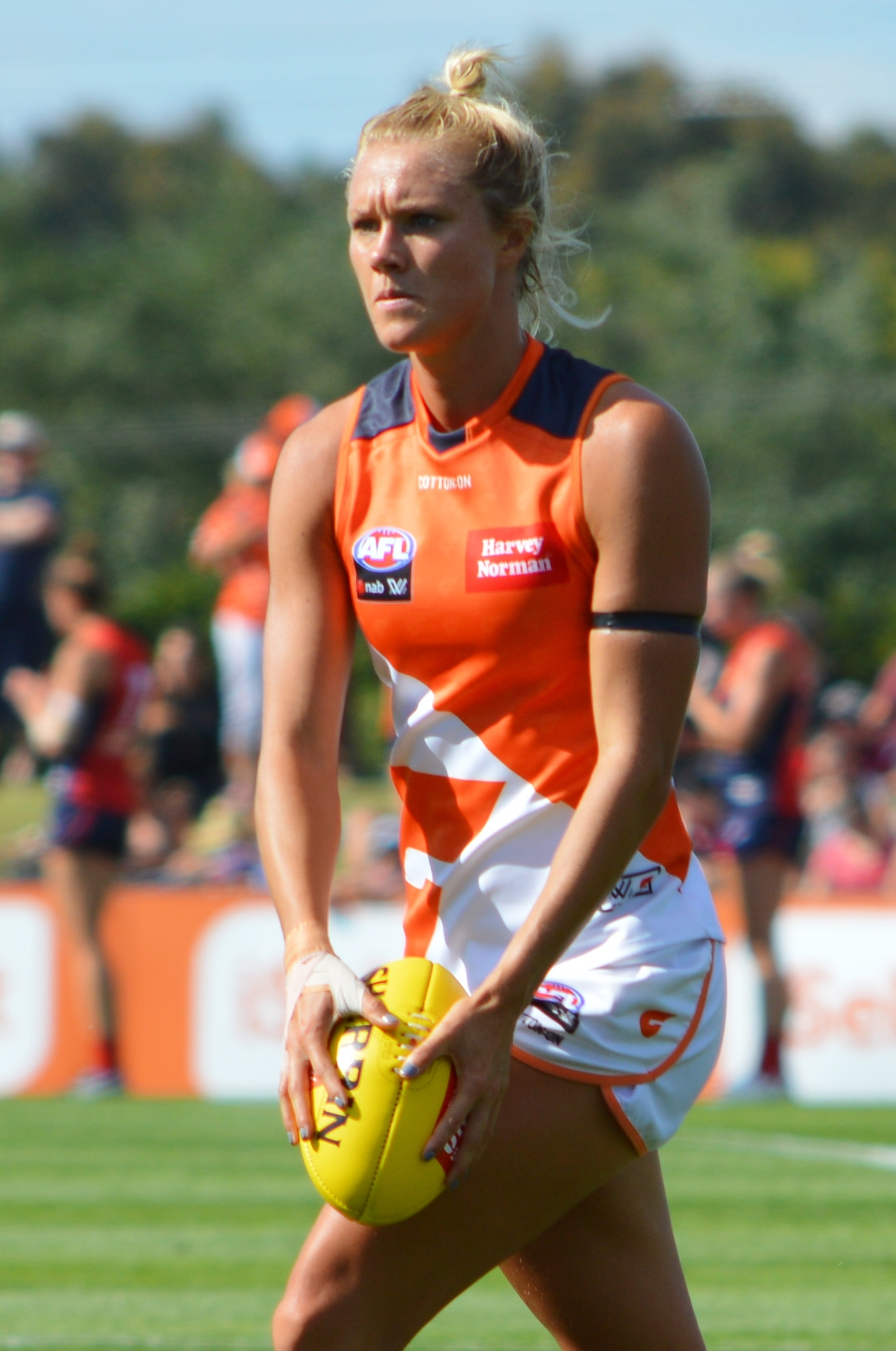
- Bennetts playing for Greater Western Sydney in February 2018

Personal information
- Born: 6 September 1989 (age 37)
- Draft: Rookie signing 2017 AFL Women's draft
- Debut: Round 1, 2018, Greater Western Sydney vs. Melbourne, at Casey Fields
- Height: 175 cm (5 ft 9 in)
- Position: Defender

Club information
- Current club: Western Bulldogs
- Number: 11

Playing career^{1}
Years	Club	Games (Goals)
2018–2021	Greater Western Sydney	30 (2)
2022–	Western Bulldogs	20 (2)
Total		50 (4)
- ^{1} Playing statistics correct to the end of the 2023 season.

Elle Bennetts (born 6 September 1989) is an Australian rules footballer playing for the Western Bulldogs in the AFL Women's (AFLW) competition. She has previously played for Greater Western Sydney. She is also an ex Physical Education and Health teacher at Star of the Sea College in Melbourne.

== Australian rules football ==
Bennetts was signed by Greater Western Sydney as a rookie signing in May 2017 after never previously having played competitive football. She was promoted to the Greater Western Sydney's main playing list following an injury to Alex Saundry and subsequently made her debut in the six point loss to Melbourne at Casey Fields in the opening round of the 2018 season.

In June 2021, Bennetts was traded to the Western Bulldogs in exchange for pick no. 28. She was given the #11 guernsey.

== Netball ==
Bennetts has played netball with Victorian Fury in the Australian Netball League between 2012 and 2017. Bennetts played her first game with New South Wales Swifts in the 2019 Suncorp Super Netball season as a Wing Attack on Sunday June 16 2019 with a 59–55 win over the Giants.

== Statistics ==
Statistics are correct to the end of the 2021 season.

Legend
G	Goals	K	Kicks	D	Disposals	T	Tackles
B	Behinds	H	Handballs	M	Marks

Season	Team	No.	Games	Totals							Averages (per game)							Votes
Season	Team	No.	Games	G	B	K	H	D	M	T	G	B	K	H	D	M	T	Votes
2018	Greater Western Sydney	22	7	0	1	43	26	69	17	23	0.0	0.1	6.1	3.7	9.9	2.4	3.3	2
2019	Greater Western Sydney	22	7	0	3	49	27	76	10	11	0.0	0.4	7.0	3.9	10.9	1.4	1.6	0
2020	Greater Western Sydney	22	7	0	0	49	38	87	21	13	0.0	0.0	7.0	5.4	12.4	3.0	1.9	0
2021	Greater Western Sydney	22	9	2	2	68	65	133	28	16	0.2	0.2	7.6	7.2	14.8	3.1	1.8	0
Career			30	2	6	209	156	365	76	63	0.1	0.2	7.0	5.2	12.2	2.5	2.1	2
