= Echuca United Football Netball Club =

Names
- Full name: Echuca United Football Netball Club
- Nickname(s): Eagles, United

Club details
- Founded: 1994; 32 years ago
- Colours
- Competition: Murray FNL
- President: Gus McMahon
- Coach: Cameron Valentine Leo Tenace
- Premierships: Echuca United Football Premierships 1996: Football Reserves 2001: Football Under 17 2002: Football Under 14, Football Under 17 2007: Football Under 14 2013: Football Senior 2014: Football Reserves Echuca United Netball Premierships 2009: Netball 15/U 2010: Netball 17/U 2011: Netball C Res, 17/U 2013: Netball 13/U 2014: Netball 12/U, Netball 15/U 2015: Netball A, B, C, C Res, 15/U, 13/U, 12/U (7 from 7) 2016: Netball A, 15/U, 12/U 2017: Netball 17/U, 15/U 2018: Netball 17/U, 13/U 2019: Netball A, C, C Res, 17/U (4 from 4)
- Ground: Echuca South Oval

Uniforms
Home

Other information
- Official website: https://echucaunitedfnc.com.au/

The Echuca United Football and Netball Club Inc. (EUFNC), known as the Echuca United Eagles, was formed from the merger of Echuca South and Echuca East Football Netball Clubs.

It is affiliated with the Murray Football Netball League, Shepparton and Districts Junior Football League and Goulburn Campaspe Junior Football League.

The Echuca United Football and Netball Club is a Good Sports accredited club.

== Club history ==
The Echuca United Football and Netball Club Inc. was formed in 1994 with the merger of the Echuca South and Echuca East Football Netball Clubs and competed in the Northern and Echuca League until 1996 wearing brown and gold vertical striped jumpers known as the Hawks. In 1990 the Northern Districts FL merged with the Echuca FL to form the Northern and Echuca Football League.

When the Northern and Echuca Football League disbanded at the end of 1996, the club joined the Murray Football League for the commencement of the 1997 season and were required to change their playing stripe colours to the blue and gold Eagles jumpers worn today because of the Barooga Hawks (already in the Murray League). The decision was made to become the Echuca United Eagles. The club used the same design as the West Coast Eagles in the AFL. At the commencement of the 2002 season, new jumpers were purchased, keeping with the blue and gold colours, but a new Eagles head design was adopted.

Echuca East Football Club (1890 to 1993)

The club was established in May, 1890, at Swanell's Hotel, Echuca and they decided to wear black and white jumpers. At some point they changed to emerald green with a white EEFC monogram. They merged with Echuca South Football Club to form Echuca United Football Club in 1994.

Echuca South Football Club (1952 to 1993)

The club was established in 1952 and competed in the Echuca Football League from 1952 to 1989, then in the Northern & Echuca Football League from 1990 to 1993. They were known as the Swans and wore both a white jumper with a red vee and a red jumper with a white ESFC monogram in a white oval during their history.

== Game statistics ==
Competition	Active	Total games	Wins	Losses	Draws	Percentage wins	Flags
Northern & Echuca Football League	1994-1996	56	32	24	0	57.14%	0
Murray Football League	1997–present (figures show to 2012)	297	119	177	1	40.06%	0

== Premierships ==
League	Total flags	Premiership year
Murray Football League	1	2013

== Football Awards ==
=== Best & Fairest ===
- 1994 - R Couchman
- 1995 - P Pellegrino
- 1996 - C Day
- 1997 - J Hatfield
- 1998 - P Taylor
- 1999 - C Day
- 2000 - B Henderson
- 2001 - D Dalziel
- 2002 - D Dalziel
- 2003 - B Pannam
- 2004 - D Dalziel
- 2005 - T McMaster
- 2006 - A Baker
- 2007 - L Jones
- 2008 - D Hueston
- 2009 - D Hueston
- 2010 - R Priest
- 2011 - D Hueston
- 2012 - S Beattie
- 2013 - F Priest
- 2014 - D Moon
- 2015 - D Hueston
- 2016 - D Hueston
- 2017 - C Wanganeen
- 2018 - N Denahy
- 2019 - J Mellington
- 2020 - Covid-19 Outbreak
- 2021 - M Lias

== AFL Players ==
The following Echuca United FC footballers played senior AFL football or were selected in the AFL draft.

- 1997 - Michael Braun

== Netball internationals ==
Australia

- Caitlyn Nevins
