= Netball Australian Capital Territory =

Netball governing body

- Jurisdiction: Australian Capital Territory
- Abbreviation: Netball ACT; NACT
- Founded: 1940s
- Affiliation: Netball Australia
- Headquarters: SolarHub ACT Netball Centre
- Location: 435 Northbourne Avenue; Lyneham, ACT
- President: Sue Scanlan
- CEO: Matthew Battams

Official website
- act.netball.com.au

Netball Australian Capital Territory is the governing body for netball in the Australian Capital Territory. It is affiliated to Netball Australia. It is responsible for organizing and managing the association's representative teams including Capital Darters, who compete in the Australian Netball Championships and The Capital Spirit, who compete in Netball NSW Premier League. It is also responsible for organizing and managing the HCF State League as well as other leagues and competitions for junior and youth teams. Its headquarters are based at the SolarHub ACT Netball Centre in Lyneham, Australian Capital Territory. It was originally founded in the early 1940s as the ACT Women's Basketball Association and was initially affiliated to the New South Wales Women's Basketball Association. In 1975 it became affiliated directly to the All Australia Netball Association.

== History ==
Netball ACT was originally founded in the early 1940s as the ACT Women's Basketball Association. While netball was played earlier than this in the Australian Capital Territory, mainly between school teams, this was the first formal association. It was initially affiliated to the New South Wales Women's Basketball Association. 1970 saw the creation of the Canberra Netball Association and the South Canberra Netball Association to accommodate increasing participation and the growing number of players. In 1975 the ACT Netball Association became affiliated directly to the All Australia Netball Association. This move was supported by Netball New South Wales and required a change to the national governing body's constitution, allowing territories to be admitted.

Since 1990, the headquarters of Netball ACT have been located at the Solarhub Netball Centre, in Lyneham, Australian Capital Territory.

== Representative teams ==
=== Current ===
Team	Leagues	Years
Capital Darters	Australian Netball Championships	2021–
The Capital Spirit	Netball NSW Premier League	2020–
Under-19, Under-17	Australian National Netball Championships	

=== Former ===
Team	Leagues	Years
Australian Institute of Sport	Australian Netball League; Esso/Mobil Superleague	2008–2012; 1985–1996
Canberra Darters	Australian Netball League	2008–2016
Canberra Giants	Australian Netball League	2017–2019
AIS Canberra Darters	Commonwealth Bank Trophy	2003–2007

== Competitions ==
- HCF State League
- Capital Chemist Junior Championships
- Social Competitions

== Member associations ==
Association	Region/city/town	Founded
ACT Men's and Mixed Netball		2021
Arawang Netball Association	Stirling	1976
Belconnen Netball Association	Belconnen	1975
Canberra Netball Association	Canberra	1970
South Canberra Netball Association	South Canberra	1970
Tuggeranong Netball Association	Tuggeranong	1985

== Netball ACT board ==
President

Members	Years
1975–19xx	Marj McMahon
20xx–2014	Sue Scanlan
2014–2016	Paul Donohue
2016	Lauren Gale
2017–2020	Louise Bilston
2020–	Sue Scanlan

CEO

Members	Years
2019–2020	David Marjoribanks
2020–	Matthew Battams

== See also ==
- Sport in the Australian Capital Territory
