= Karyn Bailey =

Australian netball player

Personal information
- Full name: Karyn Bailey
- Born: 28 July 1986 (age 39) Melbourne, Australia
- Height: 1.92 m (6 ft 3 1/2 in)
- University: Monash University

Netball career
- Playing positions: GS, GA
Years	Club team	Apps
2005	Queensland Firebirds	
2006	AIS Canberra Darters	
2007	Hunter Jaegers	
2009–2011	Victorian Fury	
2012–2016	Melbourne Vixens	
2017	Adelaide Thunderbirds	
2018-2021	Surrey Storm	
- Updated on 2017-12-02

Karyn Bailey (born 28 July 1986) is a former Australian netball player who played for the Melbourne Vixens, Adelaide Thunderbirds. and played for the Surrey Storm (UK) from 2018 - 2021. After Storm's final game on Monday 21 June 2021, she retired from domestic netball after 17 years of playing top-flight netball.

== Early years ==
Bailey was born in Melbourne and moved to Northern Territory as a three-year-old. She earned a scholarship to the Northern Territory Institute of Sport at 15 years of age. She considers Northern Territory her home.

== Netball career ==
Bailey's career commenced as a player for the Northern Territory state netball team.

In 2005, she played in the Commonwealth Bank Trophy for the Queensland Firebirds, in 2006 for the AIS Canberra Darters and in 2007 for the Hunter Jaegers.

She also played for Victorian Fury in the Australian Netball League 2009–2011, including premiership teams in 2009 and 2010. Bailey was a dominant goal scorer in the Victorian Netball League and was a member of the 2012 Victorian Netball League Championship All Stars Team.

Bailey was named the Australian Netball League Player of the Year at the Netball Australia awards in 2011, and at the Netball Victoria awards in 2012, as well as being named the Victorian Fury's Most Valuable Player.

She has played for the Melbourne Vixens in the 2012, 2013 and 2014 seasons, where she was utilised in GS and GA player positions. By the end of the 2012 season, she had won the starting position off former international Kate Beveridge, and played in the grand final, where Vixens narrowly lost to the Waikato Bay of Plenty Magic. Regardless, her performances saw her named in the Australian Netball Diamonds extended squad for the first time. She was also named in the Australian team for the 2012 Fast5 Netball World Series. In 2014 Bailey won the ANZ Championship with the Melbourne Vixens.

In April 2014, Bailey was named in the Australian Diamonds squad. In June 2014 Bailey was a member of the ANZ Championship winning Melbourne Vixens and November 2014 Bailey represented Australia in the Fast5 netball series in Auckland.

In September 2016, the Melbourne Vixens announced Bailey's departure as she signed a two-year deal to play for the Adelaide Thunderbirds but left the Thunderbirds after one season and signed on with the Hertfordshire Mavericks for 2018, as she moved to London.

== Personal Achievements ==
- Melbourne Vixens MVP (2015)
- Steve Abala Role Model (Administrator's Medal) 2015
- Victorian Fury MVP (2011)
- Monash Central Coaches Award (2011)
- ANL MVP (2011)
- Monash Central MVP (2010)
- Hunter Jaegers Rising Star Award (2007)
- VNL All Stars Teams (2009–2011)
- Australian squad U/21 (2005–06)
- TID U19 (2004–05), U21 (2005–06)

== Team Achievements ==
- Australian Fast5 Flyers (2014)
- ANZ Championship Winners - Melbourne Vixens (2014)
- Australian Diamonds Squad (2012, 2013, 2014)
- Australian Fast5 Diamonds (2012)
- ANZ Championship Runners Up – Melbourne Vixens (2012)
- Melbourne Vixens (2011–2014)
- VNL Premiers (2011)
- Vic Fury Runner Up (2011)
- VNL Runners up (2010)
- Vic Fury Premiership (2009, 2010)
