= Wendy Jones =

Australian netball player

Personal information
- Full name: Wendy Jones (Née: Jacobsen)
- Born: 25 October 1978 (age 47) Croydon, Victoria, Australia
- Occupations: Nurse and Netball coach
- Height: 1.78 m (5 ft 10 in)
- University: Australian Catholic University

Netball career
- Playing positions: WA, C
Years	Club team	Apps
1998–2007	Melbourne Phoenix	115
2008, 2010	Melbourne Vixens	18
Years	National team	Caps
2005–07	Australia	
- Updated on 11 April 2010

Wendy Jones (born 25 October 1978) is an Australian netball player. Jacobsen was captain of the Victorian Under 19 team in 1996–97 and the Under 21 team from 1997 to 1999, she represented Victoria from 1990 as an 11-year-old until 2011. She was a scholarship holder at the Australian Institute of Sport in 1997 and 1998. Also a member of the Australian national team from 2005 to 2008. She played in the Commonwealth Bank Trophy with the Melbourne Phoenix from 1998 to 2007, winning premierships in 2000, 2002–03 and 2005.

With the start of the ANZ Championship in 2008, Jacobsen played with the Melbourne Vixens for the inaugural season. She was signed again for 2009, but a knee injury during the preseason ended her campaign.

Jacobsen re-signed with the Vixens for 2010. In contrast to the 2009 season, 2010 proved disastrous for the Vixens. At the end of the 2010 season, Jacobsen decided to announce her retirement from elite netball after a career gaining 5 premierships and playing 148 matches at the elite level. Outside of netball, Jacobsen also works as a netball coach at Rowville Secondary College in Melbourne.

Wendy has decided to make a return to netball in 2013 to play in the Championship Division of the Victorian Netball League, for Boroondara Genesis with old Vixen teammates Kara Richards and Ashlee Howard.
