= Tayla Honey =

Australian netball player

Personal information
- Born: 20 August 1997 (age 28) Melbourne, Australia
- Height: 1.75 m (5 ft 9 in)
- School: Geelong Grammar School

Netball career
- Playing positions: WA, C
Years	Club team	Apps
2019–2021	Melbourne Vixens	

Tayla Honey (born 20 August 1997) is an Australian netball player in the Suncorp Super Netball league, playing for the Melbourne Vixens.

Honey began her netball career with the Vixens as a training partner in 2017 and she spent two years playing for the squad's reserves team, the Victorian Fury. She was elevated to the club's senior list ahead of the 2019 season, though she is expected to miss the entire season after tearing her Achilles tendon during pre-season training. Honey is the daughter of the club's former assistant coach, Dianne.
