= Shannon Eagland =

Australian netball player

Personal information
- Born: 16 May 1990 (age 36) Adelaide, South Australia
- Height: 1.82 m (6 ft 0 in)
- School: Yarra Valley Grammar School

Netball career
- Playing positions: WD, GD, GK
Years	Club team	Apps
2011	Melbourne Vixens	
2012	Queensland Firebirds	
2013	Melbourne Vixens	
2017-	West Coast Fever	

Shannon Eagland (born 16 May 1990) is an Australian netball player in the Suncorp Super Netball league, playing for the Sunshine Coast Lightning.

In her early career, Eagland was selected in the Australia U/21 Team and Participated in the 2009 Australian World Youth Cup championships as part or the winning Australian team. She began her ANZ Championship netball career in the ANZ Championship in 2011 for the Melbourne Vixens as a temporary replacement player. In 2012 Eagland joined the Queensland Firebirds where she played 11 games before moving to the Melbourne Vixens, where she played 13 games in 2013. In 2014 she left the ANZ Championship and played for the Melbourne University Lightning in the Victorian Netball League, earning a place in the VNL Championship Team of the Year. Upon moving to the Fever in the new Super Netball league, Eagland ruptured her anterior cruciate ligament in the fourth round and missed the remainder of the season. She returned to the court in the 2018 pre-season.
