= Melissa Bragg =

Australian netball player

Mel Bragg
Personal information
- Full name: Melissa Bragg
- Born: 17 December 1994 (age 31) Werribee, Victoria, Australia
- Height: 177 cm (5 ft 9 1/2 in)

Netball career
- Playing positions: WD, GD
Years	Club team	Apps
2018–2021	Collingwood Magpies	26

Melissa (Mel) Bragg (born 17 December 1994) is an Australian netball and AFL Women's player for the Geelong Football Club.

She has previously played in the Suncorp Super Netball league for the Collingwood Magpies.

== Netball career ==
Bragg's elite-level netball career commenced in 2015, when she played for the Victorian Fury team in the Australian Netball League. She moved to the Collingwood Magpies as a training partner in 2018 and played for Tasmanian Magpies, though she made her debut for the Magpies at Super Netball level in the 2018 regular season against the New South Wales Swifts. From 2018 to 2019, Bragg made four Super Netball appearances as a training partner, and she was elevated to the Magpies' senior list ahead of the 2020 season.

== Australian rules football career ==
Bragg switched to playing Australian rules football in 2022, playing in the 2022 VFL Women's season with Geelong. She was later added to Geelong's AFL Women's squad for AFL Women's season seven.
