= Micaela Wilson =

Australian netball player

Micaela Wilson-Dabney
Personal information
- Born: 3 November 1992 (age 34) Melbourne, Australia
- Height: 1.88 m (6 ft 2 in)
- Relative: Robbie Gray (cousin)
- School: Emmaus College

Netball career
- Playing positions: GK, GD, WD
Years	Club team	Apps
2010–14	Melbourne Vixens	
2015–16	New South Wales Swifts	
2017	Collingwood Magpies	
- Updated on 4 February 2011

Micaela Wilson (born 3 November 1992 in Melbourne, Australia) is an Australian netball player.

In her career, Wilson has played for the New South Wales Swifts and Melbourne Vixens. Most recently she played for the Collingwood Magpies in 2017 before being cut from the team at the end of the season.

She predominantly plays goal keeper or goal defence, but has also played wing defence in her career.

== National Representation ==
- 2013 Australian 21/U World Youth Championship Team

== Netball Career Facts ==
- 2014 NSW Swifts replacement player
- 2013 World Youth Championship Silver Medal
- 2013 Australian Institute of Sport Scholarship recipient
