= Netball in Australia =

Overview of the ball sport in Australia

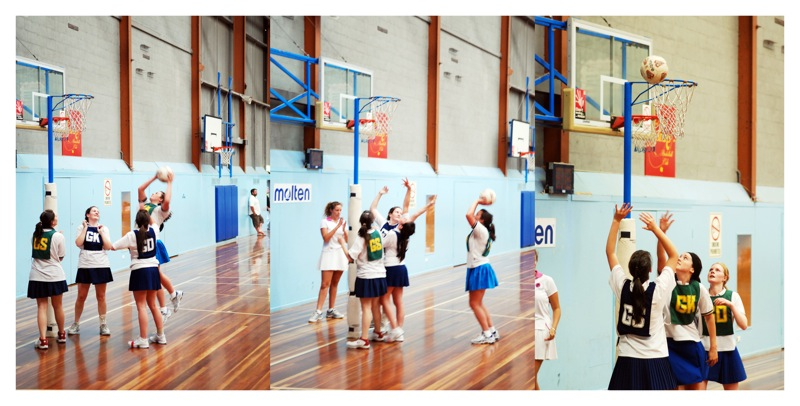
- A netball game held in Australia
- Country: Australia
- Governing body: Netball Australia
- National team: Australia
- Nickname: Diamonds
- First played: Early 1897
- Registered players: 360,000

National competitions
- Super Netball

Club competitions
- Australian Netball Championships; Australian National Netball Championships

International competitions
- Netball World Cup

Audience records
- Single match: 2015 Netball World Cup, 16,752, 16 August 2015, Sydney Super Dome

Netball is the most popular women's team participation sport in Australia. In 1985, there were 347,000 players, and by 1995, participation had exceeded 360,000. Throughout much of Australia's netball history, the game was largely a participation sport and historically struggled to draw large crowds as a spectator sport. However, this shifted significantly with the introduction of elite domestic leagues.

Between 2005 and 2006, 56,100 Australians attended one or two netball matches; of these, 41,600 were women. A further 46,200 attended three to five matches, 34,400 of whom were women. Another 86,400 attended six or more matches, 54,800 of whom were women. Overall, 188,800 people attended netball matches in that period, including 130,800 women. At that time, netball was the 10th most popular spectator sport for women, trailing Australian rules football (1,011,300), horse racing (912,200), rugby league (542,600), motor sports (462,100), rugby union (232,400), football (212,200), harness racing (190,500), cricket (183,200), and tennis (163,500). In 2004, the country set an attendance record for a netball match when a crowd of 14,339 watched the Australia–New Zealand test at the Sydney Super Dome. This has since been surpassed by modern leagues.

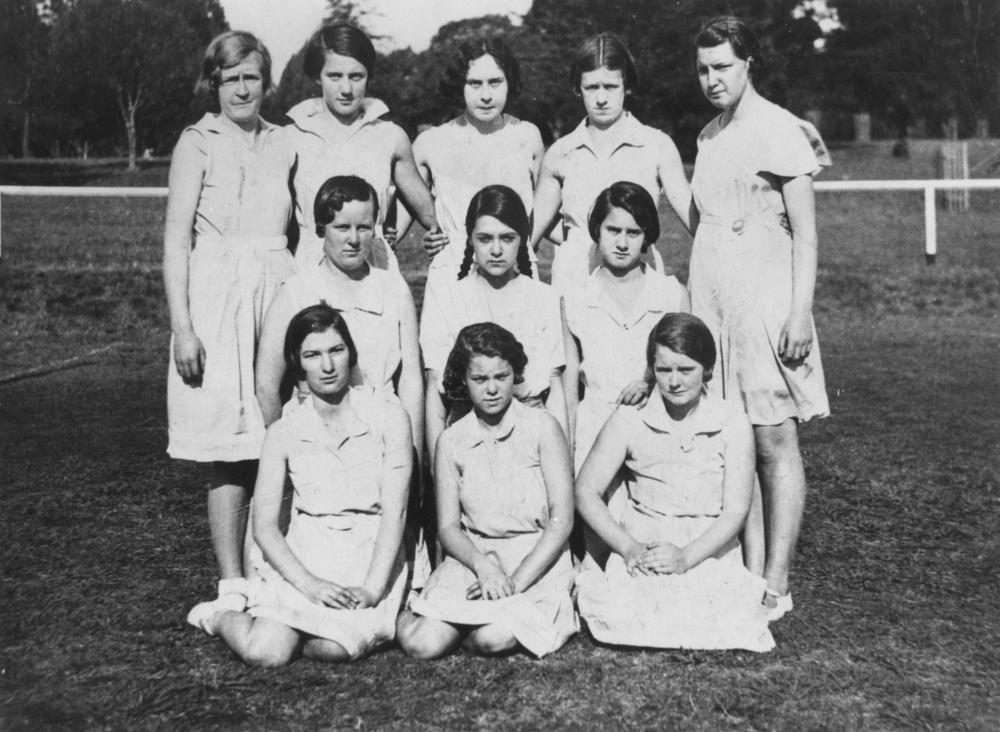
Toowoomba netball team, 1932.

Netball—initially called "women's basketball" (distinct from the form of basketball played by women)—was reportedly introduced to Australia as early as 1897, although most sources agree it was formally established around the start of the 20th century. Interstate competition began in 1924, with the All-Australia Women's Basket Ball Association formed in 1927. An All-Australian Tournament, later called the Australian National Netball Championships, was first contested between states in 1928, when it was won by Victoria. During the 1930s, university participation was largely unorganised, and players were not required to register. This was viewed positively, as it encouraged participation from those who might not have otherwise played. Australia's national team toured England in 1957. This tour resulted in a number of Commonwealth countries meeting to standardise the rules of the game. The sport officially adopted the name "netball" in Australia in 1970.

In Australia, 80% of all netball is played at clubs. The number of netball clubs nationwide has been in decline since the 1940s. Between 1985 and 2003, only two Western Australian towns—Brookton and Pingelly—decreased the distance players had to travel to compete. Prior to the creation of the trans-Tasman ANZ Championship in 2008, the National Netball League was the major competition in Australia. It included teams from the Australian Capital Territory, New South Wales, Queensland, Victoria, South Australia, and Western Australia. After the 2016 ANZ Championship season, Netball Australia withdrew from that competition and established Super Netball as the country's new premier domestic league.

The typical netball demographic is an 18- to 24-year-old, unmarried, Australian-born woman employed full-time. The average player in New South Wales has played the game for 10.8 years. Most New South Wales–based school-aged players participate at school and with friends. Girls from non-English-speaking backgrounds were found to be more likely to play for fun than their English-speaking counterparts, who often played for their school or parents. They were also less likely to have mothers who played netball (18.2%, compared with 35.2% for English-speaking girls). Most New South Wales–based adult players engage with the sport for fun and its physical benefits.

The country has hosted several major international netball events, including:

- The 1967 (Perth), 1991 (Sydney), and 2015 (Sydney) World Netball Championships.
- The netball tournaments at the 2006 and 2018 Commonwealth Games.
- The 2011 International Challenge Men's and Mixed Netball Tournament in Perth.

The Australian national netball team is the most successful team in international netball history. The team won the inaugural World Tournament in 1963 in England, and has won nine of the first twelve Netball World Championships. In addition to being the current world champions, the Australian Diamonds are ranked first on the World Netball Rankings.

Australia defeated the Silver Ferns to win the World Youth Netball Championships in the Cook Islands in July 2009. Australia also fields a men's national team, which competed in the 2009 and 2011 International Challenge Men's and Mixed Netball Tournaments.

== Australian netball milestones ==
1920

- First recorded interstate match is held in Sydney.

1927

- All Australia Women's Basket Ball Association is formed.

1928

- First All-Australia Carnival is held in Victoria.

1931

- First AA Umpires Award is granted to Anne Clark and Elsie Ferres.

1938

- First international match takes place (Australia v New Zealand, in Melbourne).

1956

- More than 7,000 people watch Australia defeat England in London.

1960

- The International Federation of Netball Associations (IFNA) is established in August during a conference in Colombo, Ceylon (now Sri Lanka); agreement is reached to adopt an international code of playing rules.

1963

- First World Tournament is held in Eastbourne, England, with 11 countries competing.
- Australia becomes the first world champion.

1967

- Australia finishes runner-up to New Zealand at the World Tournament.

1970

- The sport's name is officially changed from "women's basket ball" to "netball".

1971

- Australia wins the World Tournament.

1975

- Australia wins the Netball World Championship.

1976

- AA Club Carnival is introduced.

1978

- First full-time salaried position, National Development Officer, is appointed.
- National office is established in Martin Place, Sydney.

1979

- Australia finishes equal first (with New Zealand and Trinidad and Tobago) at the World Tournament.

1980

- First under-age National Championships (Youth 16 and under) are held in Penrith, Sydney.
- Joyce Brown is appointed as the first National Coaching Director.

1981

- Netball becomes one of eight foundation sports at the Australian Institute of Sport (AIS) in Canberra.
- First International Club Competition is held in Hawaii (won by the AIS).
- A direct mail service, AANA Sports Trading, is introduced.

1983

- National office relocates to Clarence Street, Sydney.
- International Club Carnival, the "Esso Gold", is held on the Gold Coast and televised.
- Australia becomes world champion.

1984

- Gladys Waugh is appointed as the first Honorary National Treasurer.
- First under-21 Australian team (Young Australians) is selected.

1985

- Robert McMurtrie is appointed as National Executive Administrative Officer.
- Inaugural National Netball Carnival for Intellectually Disabled Players takes place.
- First officially published Annual Report of the AANA (1985/86) is released.
- First national league competition, the Esso Superleague, is established.

1986

- Headquarters is purchased at Cowper Street, Harris Park, Sydney.
- Incorporation of the Association (All Australia Netball Association Limited) is completed.
- Adoption of a Player Trust Fund Policy enables elite players to earn from the sport.

1987

- Finals Rounds are introduced to the Open/21s National Championships.
- Australia finishes equal second (with Trinidad and Tobago) to New Zealand at the World Tournament.

1988

- First World Youth Cup is held in Canberra (won by Australia).

1990

- Keeley Devery is appointed as National Media Coordinator.
- Winners of the Esso Superleague receive the Prime Minister's Cup.
- Australian Netball Touring Team visits China as part of Asian development.
- Netball features as a demonstration sport at the Commonwealth Games in Auckland, New Zealand.

1991

- Australia hosts the 1991 World Netball Championships in Sydney, defeating New Zealand in the final.
- Australia becomes part of IFNA's Asian region (formerly in Oceania).

1992

- Chris Burton is appointed as National Umpiring Director.

1993

- Head office relocates to Wentworth Street, Parramatta, Sydney.
- Netball is acknowledged as a "recognised sport" by the International Olympic Committee.
- A National Umpiring Badge is introduced.
- Inaugural Australasian Regional Schools Championships are held.

1994

- Association Management Review is carried out by Albany Consulting.

1995

- New structure is approved, featuring nine board directors.
- Australia retains its World Championship title.

1996

- Date of the AGM is altered to May.
- National Netball League Company is established.
- Australia wins the Netball World Youth Cup.

1997

- Inaugural season of the Commonwealth Bank Trophy competition takes place.
- New financial year takes effect for Netball Australia, aligning with the calendar year (January to December).
- Netball Australia website is launched.

1998

- The honorary position of National Liaison Officer is abolished.
- Australia wins gold at the Commonwealth Games in Kuala Lumpur.

1999

- The Australian 21U coach and AIS head coach positions are merged under Norma Plummer.
- Sue Hawkins is appointed as the first high-performance manager.
- Australia wins the World Championships.

2000

- Hundreds of netball personnel receive the Australian Sports Medal from the Australian Government.
- Australia wins the Netball World Youth Cup.

2001

- National Netball League Proprietary Limited Company is deregistered.

2002

- Head office relocates to Marion Street, Harris Park, Sydney.
- Australia retains its Commonwealth Games title in Manchester.

2003

- Australia finishes as runner-up to New Zealand at the World Championships.

2004

- A then-world-record crowd of 14,339 attends the Australia v New Zealand test in Sydney.

2005

- Australia places third, behind England and New Zealand, at the World Youth Netball Championships in Fort Lauderdale, United States.

2006

- Netball Australia launches the National Membership Administration System, linking all clubs, associations, and member organisations with Netball Australia for the first time.
- Australia wins silver at the Melbourne 2006 Commonwealth Games. New Zealand wins gold.
- The Commonwealth Bank Trophy celebrates its 10th season.

2007

- Head office relocates to King Street, Melbourne.
- Australia wins the 2007 World Netball Championships in Auckland, New Zealand.

2008

- Inaugural season of the ANZ Championship begins (replacing the Commonwealth Bank Trophy).
- Establishment of the Australian Netball League, the country's second-tier feeder league.
- The national team is rebranded as the "Australian Netball Diamonds”.

2009

- Australia wins the World Youth Netball Championships in the Cook Islands, beating New Zealand in the final.

2010

- Australia wins silver at the Delhi 2010 Commonwealth Games. New Zealand wins gold.
- Sharelle McMahon is honoured by the Australian Commonwealth Games Association, becoming the opening ceremony flag bearer at the Delhi Commonwealth Games.

2011

- Australia wins the 2011 World Netball Championships in Singapore, claiming its 10th world title.
- Lisa Alexander takes over as Diamonds coach from Norma Plummer following the World Championships.
- The Queensland Firebirds make history by completing the ANZ Championship season undefeated.

2013

- Netball Australia moves its head office to the new Netball HQ in Fitzroy.
- Australia wins silver at the 2013 World Youth Netball Cup in Glasgow, Scotland. New Zealand wins gold.
- Australia's Fast5 Netball World Series team is rebranded as the Fast5 Flyers.

2017

- Establishment of the Super Netball competition, the country's new premier domestic netball league.
- Re-alignment of the Australian Netball League second-tier competition.

2025

- The Suncorp Super Netball (SSN) league breaks records with a total season attendance of 386,455.
- This marks the biggest SSN season in history, keeping the league as the most attended in Australian women's sport for the second consecutive year.

== Bibliography ==
- Australian Bureau of Statistics (2006). "4177.0 – Participation in Sports and Physical Recreation, Australia 2005–06".
- Australian Women's Weekly (20 July 1977). "NETBALL". The Australian Women's Weekly. National Library of Australia. p. 29.
- Blanch, John, ed. (1978). Ampol's Sporting Records (Revised Fifth ed.). Crows Nest, New South Wales, Australia: Jack Pollard Publishing Pty. Ltd. p. 284. ISBN 0-909950-22-9.
- DaCosta, Lamartine P.; Miragaya, Ana (2002). Worldwide experiences and trends in sport for all. Meyer & Meyer Sport. ISBN 1-84126-085-1. OCLC 248362122.
- Davis, Luke; Davis, Damien (2006). Netball. Getting into. Macmillan Education. ISBN 0-7329-9987-1. OCLC 156762948.
- Department of Foreign Affairs and Trade (May 2008). "About Australia: Sporting Events". Archived from the original on 5 March 2011.
- International Federation of Netball Associations. "History of Netball". Archived from the original on 6 March 2011.
- International Federation of Netball Associations (21 January 2011). "Current World Rankings". Archived from the original on 19 May 2011.
- International Federation of Netball Associations (3 April 2009). "Calling All Netball Fans!". International Federation of Netball Associations. Archived from the original on 14 March 2011.
- International Federation of Netball Associations (14 January 2009). "Netball as never seen before". International Federation of Netball Associations. Archived from the original on 2 February 2009.
- International Netball (September 2006). "netball rules". International Netball. Archived from the original on 27 February 2011.
- Netball Australia. "The History of Netball". Archived from the original on 16 September 2009.
- Netball Singapore (2011). "Milestones". Archived from the original on 18 February 2011.
- Samoa Observer (28 February 2011). "A journey of a thousand miles begins for Samoa national men's netball team". Samoa Observer. Archived from the original on 19 March 2012.
- Perth Gazette (3 May 1934). "UNIVERSITY SWIMMING". The West Australian. Perth: National Library of Australia. p. 15.
- Taylor, Tracy (November 2001). "Gendering Sport: The Development of Netball in Australia" (PDF). Sporting Traditions, Journal of the Australian Society for Sports History. 18 (1): 57–74. Archived from the original (PDF) on 2 April 2012.
- Taylor, Tracy (1998). "Issues of cultural diversity in women's sport". Women in Sport (PDF). Vol. 29. Archived from the original (PDF) on 13 January 2012.
- Van Bottenburg, Maarten (2001). Global games. University of Illinois Press. ISBN 0-252-02654-3.
- World Youth Netball Championships – Cook Island 2009 (22 August 2009). "NZ loses WYNC final to a fired-up Australian team". Archived from the original on 13 December 2019.
