= Super Netball Reserves =

Netball competition in Australia

- Founded: 2008
- Owner: Netball Australia
- No. of teams: 8 (2026)
- Country: Australia
- Most recent champion: QBE Swifts Academy (2026)
- Most titles: Vixens Academy/Victorian Fury (8 titles)
- Level on pyramid: 2

The Super Netball Reserves or SN Reserves, formerly the Australian Netball Championships (ANC) and Australian Netball League (ANL), is an Australian netball competition. It has served as a second-level competition, initially below the ANZ Championship, and later below Suncorp Super Netball, and is organised by Netball Australia.

The teams in the competition are the reserve teams of Suncorp Super Netball teams, featuring selected stand-out players from state leagues, SSN club training partners and SSN contracted players. The competition also includes three Netball Australia Member Organisation representative teams from Tasmania, the ACT and the Northern Territory.

The Victorian Fury (now Vixens Academy) are the competition's most successful team, having won eight premierships.

== History ==
=== Australian Netball League ===
==== Foundation ====
The Australian Netball League was first played for during the 2008 season. Netball Australia wanted to organise a second level national league to bridge the gap between state leagues, like the South Australia state netball league, the Victorian Netball League and the West Australian Netball League, and the new ANZ Championship. It was also designed to provide a national competition for the states and territories of Australia, such the Australian Capital Territory, Northern Territory and Tasmania, who did not have an ANZ Championship franchise.

==== Victorian Fury dominance ====
Victorian Fury were the inaugural champions, defeating the Australian Institute of Sport 56–41 in the first grand final. In 2009 Fury retained the title and in 2010 they completed a three in a row. In 2011 NNSW Waratahs became the first team other than Fury to win the ANL title. In the grand final they defeated Fury 55–46. Between 2013 and 2016 Fury completed a four in a row of ANL titles. In 2016 Fury won their seventh title and in 2019 they won their eighth.

=== Australian Netball Championships ===
In June 2020, Netball Australia announced that the 2020 ANL season would be cancelled due to the COVID-19 pandemic. In October 2020, it was announced that the ANL was to be rebranded as the Australian Netball Championships, featuring a new tournament style format with expanded team entry parameters. Super Netball teams and Netball Australia member organisations would all be invited to enter teams. In July 2021, Netball Australia announced details of the planned inaugural ANC tournament due to be played in September and hosted by Latrobe City Council and Collingwood Magpies in Traralgon. However, in August 2021 this tournament was also cancelled due to the COVID-19 pandemic. The competition was run for the first time under its new name in 2022.

=== Super Netball Reserves ===
In 2024, the competition was run alongside the Suncorp Super Netball season as a pilot program, and was officially introduced for the 2025 season. The reworked competition included reserve teams of all eight SSN clubs, plus three Netball Australia member organisation teams.

The eight reserves teams play in a home-and-away season, playing each team once. Games take place alongside their respective SSN club, usually the day before or after an SSN match at a different venue, or pre- or post-SSN match at the same venue. At the conclusion of the home-and-away season, the competition holds a Finals weekend at a central venue, which includes a Grand Final contested between the teams in first and second on the ladder, a 3rd v 4th final contested between the teams in third and fourth on the ladder, and a series of matches between the three member organisation teams and the teams from the bottom four positions on the ladder. The three member organisation teams contest a "play-in tournament" prior to the finals weekend to determine seeding and opponents.

== Teams ==
=== 2026 teams ===
The main teams in the competition are the reserve teams of Suncorp Super Netball teams, featuring selected stand-out players from state leagues, SSN club training partners and even SSN contracted players. The first eight teams listed below play in the main home-and-away season of the competition.

In order to increase opportunities for states and territories without SSN representation, the SN Reserves competition also includes three Member Organisation representative teams, who play in a mini "play-in tournament" between themselves, and then against the teams from the bottom four positions on the ladder on the Finals weekend.

SN Reserves Teams
| Team | SSN affiliate | State/Territory |
|---|---|---|
| Adelaide Thunderbirds Futures | Adelaide Thunderbirds | South Australia |
| GIANTS Netball Reserves | GIANTS Netball | New South Wales |
| Melbourne Mavericks Reserves | Melbourne Mavericks | Victoria |
| QBE Swifts Academy | New South Wales Swifts | New South Wales |
| Queensland Firebirds Futures | Queensland Firebirds | Queensland |
| Sunshine Coast Lightning Bolts | Sunshine Coast Lightning | Queensland |
| Vixens Academy | Melbourne Vixens | Victoria |
| West Coast Fever Reserves | West Coast Fever | Western Australia |
| Team | Member Organisation | |
| Tasmania Wild | Netball Tasmania | |
| Capital Darters | Netball ACT | |
| Territory Storm | Netball Northern Territory | |

=== Former teams ===
Defunct ANL and ANC teams
| Team | Region | Debut season | Final season |
|---|---|---|---|
| Australian Institute of Sport | Australian Capital Territory | 2008 | 2012 |
| NNSW Blues | New South Wales | 2008 | 2014 |
| Singapore | Singapore | 2009 | 2010 |
| Tasmanian Spirit | Tasmania | 2008 | 2015 |
| Tasmanian Spirit/Tasmanian Magpies/ANC Collingwood Magpies | Tasmania/Victoria | 2017 | 2023 |
| Victorian Flames | Victoria | 2013 | 2014 |

== Grand Finals and MVPs ==
=== Australian Netball League ===
Australian Netball League Grand Finals
| Season | Winners | Score | Runners up | Venue | Season MVP(s) |
|---|---|---|---|---|---|
| 2008 | Victorian Fury | 56–41 | Australian Institute of Sport | Sydney | Narelle Eather (NNSW Blues) |
| 2009 | Victorian Fury | 46–32 | Australian Institute of Sport | Brisbane Covention & Exhibition Centre | Kathleen Knott (Victorian Fury) |
| 2010 | Victorian Fury | 54–47 | NNSW Waratahs | Waverley Netball Centre | Amorette Wild (NNSW Waratahs) |
| 2011 | NNSW Waratahs | 55–46 | Victorian Fury | Waverley Netball Centre | Karyn Bailey (Victorian Fury) |
| 2012 | Southern Force | 50–36 | NNSW Waratahs | Waverley Netball Centre | Kristy Guthrie (NNSW Waratahs) |
| 2013 | Victorian Fury | 56–51 | NNSW Waratahs | Netball SA Stadium | Mwai Kumwenda (Victorian Fury) |
| 2014 | Victorian Fury | 51–49 | Queensland Fusion | Waverley Netball Centre | Ashleigh Brazill (Western Sting); Kristina Brice (NNSW Waratahs) |
| 2015 | Victorian Fury | 58–46 | Southern Force | Waverley Netball Centre | Kate Shimmin (Southern Force) |
| 2016 | Victorian Fury | 53–46 | NNSW Waratahs | Netball Central | Vanessa Mullampy (NNSW Waratahs) |
| 2017 | Western Sting | 63–47 | Victorian Fury | State Netball Centre, Perth | Sophie Garbin (Western Sting) |
| 2018 | Tasmanian Magpies | 54–53 | Canberra Giants | AIS Arena | Rahni Samason (Victorian Fury) |
| 2019 | Victorian Fury | 54–53 | NNSW Waratahs | State Netball Hockey Centre | Emma Ryde (Victorian Fury) |

=== Australian Netball Championships ===
Australian Netball Championships Grand Finals
| Season | Winners | Score | Runners up | Venue | Season MVP(s) |
|---|---|---|---|---|---|
| 2022 | Southern Force | 59–57 | Victorian Fury | Gippsland Regional Indoor Sports Stadium, Traralgon | Hannah Mundy (Victorian Fury) |
| 2023 | ANC Collingwood Magpies | 57–55 | Swifts Academy | Morayfield Sport and Leisure Centre | Emily Andrew (Victorian Fury) |
| 2024 | NNSW Waratahs | 58–50 | Capital Darters | SolarHub ACT Netball Centre | Millie Tonkin (NNSW Waratahs) |

=== Super Netball Reserves ===
Super Netball Reserves Grand Finals
| Season | Winners | Score | Runners up | Venue | Season MVP(s) |
|---|---|---|---|---|---|
| 2025 | West Coast Fever Reserves | 67–57 | Melbourne Mavericks Reserves | Waverley Netball Centre | Lucy Voyvodic (Adelaide Thunderbirds Futures); Frederika Schneideman (QBE Swifts Academy) |
| 2026 | QBE Swifts Academy | 69–55 | Sunshine Coast Lightning Bolts | Netball Central | Eliza Burton (QBE Swifts Academy) |

=== Total premierships per team ===
| Winners | Seasons | Titles | ANL | ANC | SNR |
|---|---|---|---|---|---|
| Vixens Academy (Victorian Fury) | 2008, 2009, 2010, 2013, 2014, 2015, 2016, 2019 | 8 | 8 | 0 | 0 |
| QBE Swifts Academy (NNSW Waratahs) | 2011, 2024, 2026 | 3 | 1 | 1 | 1 |
| Adelaide Thunderbirds Futures (Southern Force) | 2012, 2022 | 2 | 1 | 1 | 0 |
| West Coast Fever Reserves (Western Sting) | 2017, 2025 | 2 | 1 | 0 | 1 |
| Tasmanian Magpies/ANC Collingwood Magpies | 2018, 2023 | 2 | 1 | 1 | 0 |
