= List of sporting facilities at Marrara Sporting Complex =

List of sporting facilities at the Marrara Sporting Complex

Marrara Sporting Complex
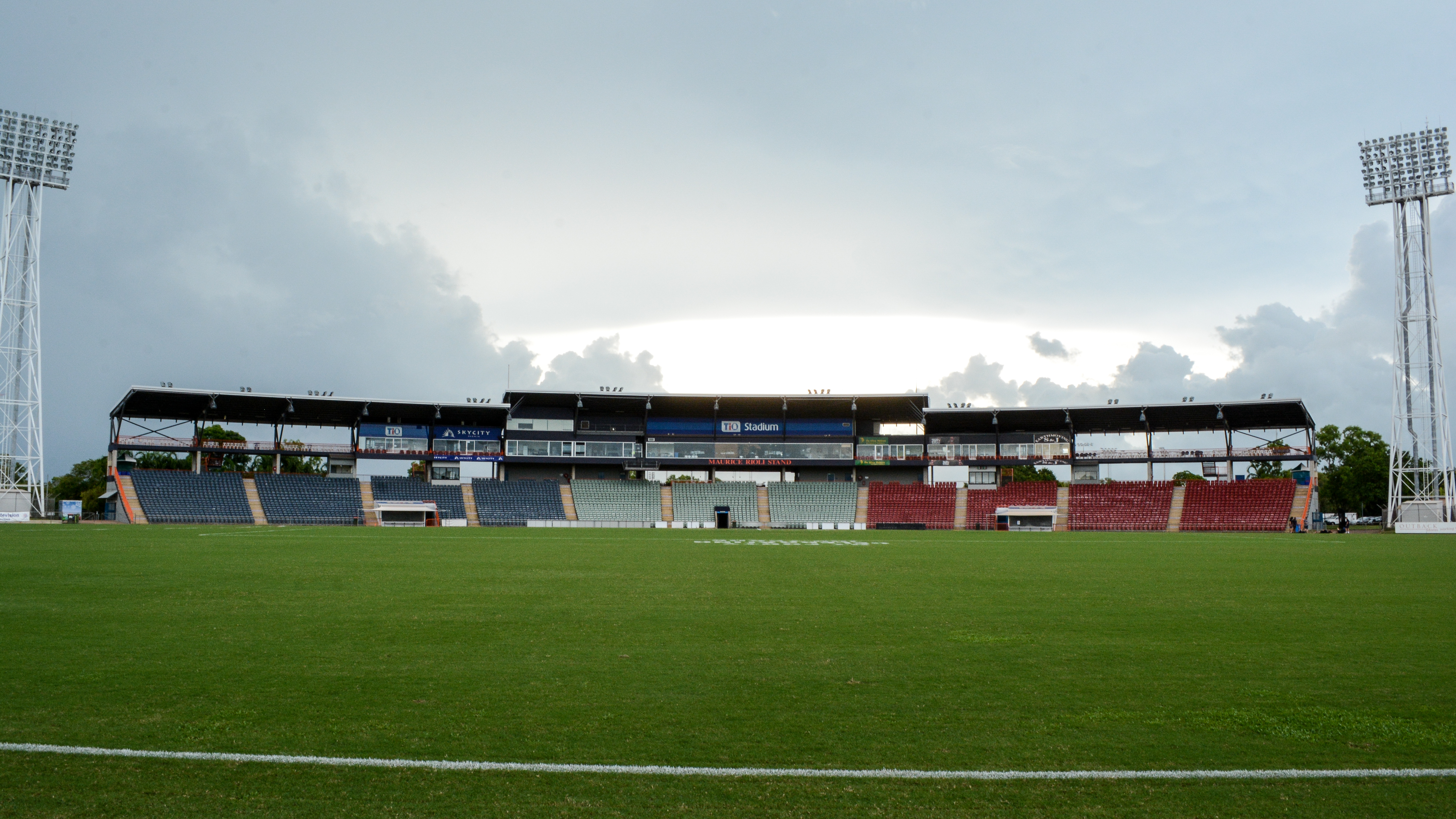
- Marrara Oval is the largest stadium in the Northern Territory
- Interactive map of Marrara Sporting Complex
- Address: Marrara, Darwin, Northern Territory, Australia
- Location: Darwin, Northern Territory
- Coordinates: 12.398653°S 130.884370°E
- Owner: Northern Territory Government
- Type: Sports precinct

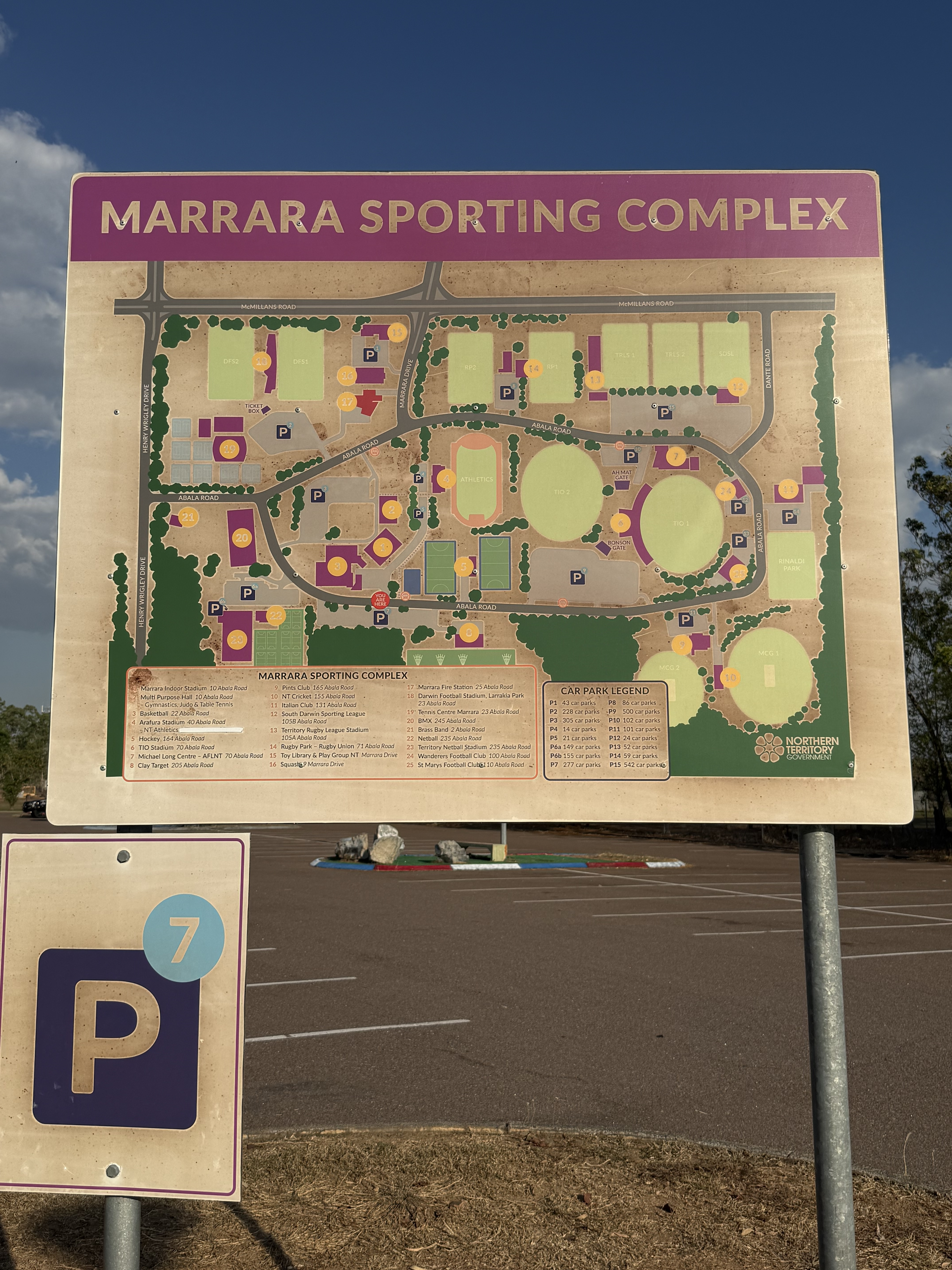
Marrara Sporting Complex sign, September 2025

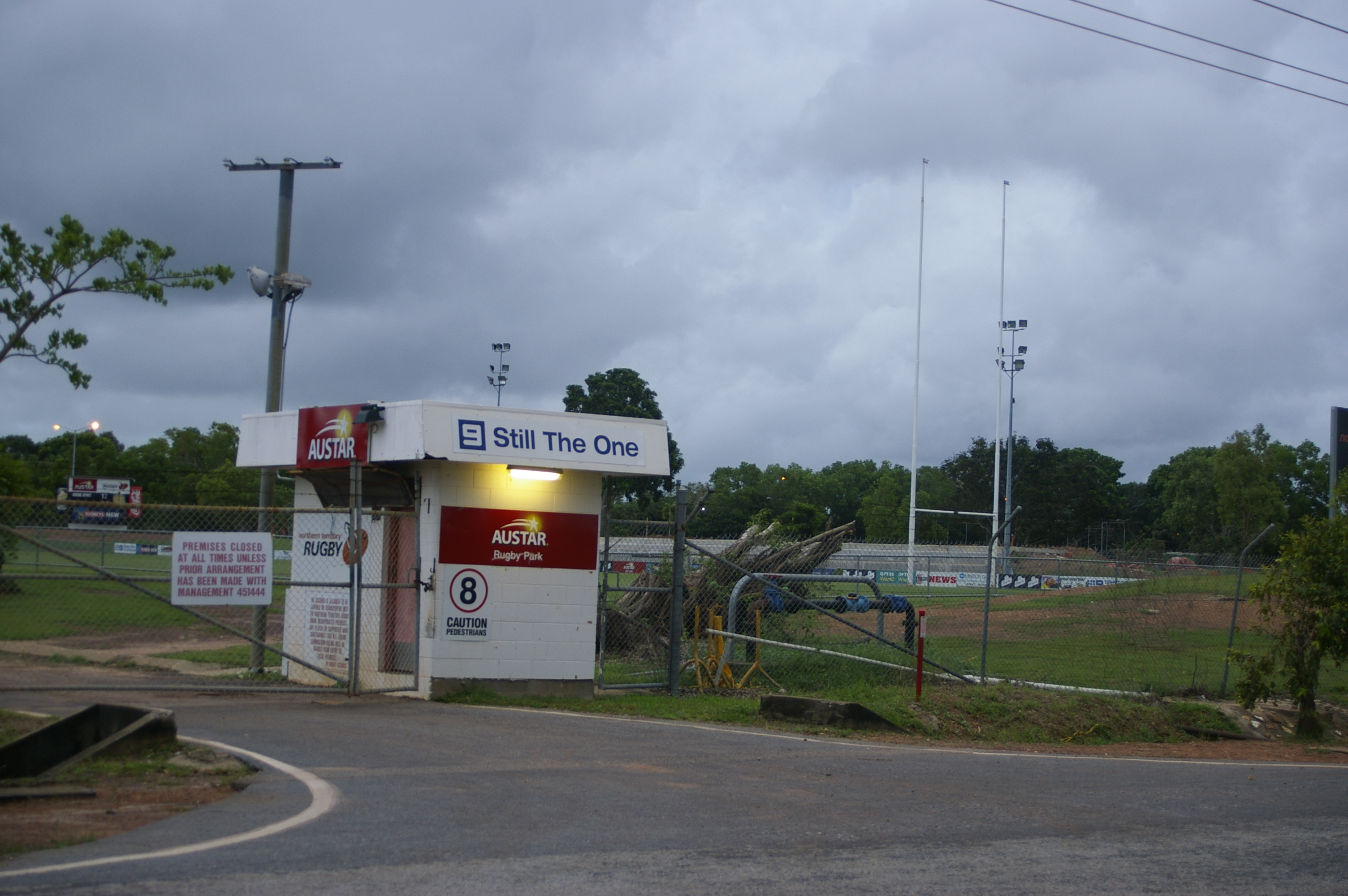
Marrara Rugby Park in 2008

The Marrara Sporting Complex in Darwin, Northern Territory, Australia, is the city’s principal sporting precinct. It contains venues for cricket, Australian rules football, soccer, rugby league, rugby union, field hockey, athletics, netball, tennis, BMX racing, and various indoor sports. The complex regularly hosts national and international competitions, including Australian Football League (AFL) and National Rugby League (NRL) matches, athletics championships, and the Arafura Games. Development of the precinct began in the 1980s.

== Facilities ==
Facility	Other names	Primary sports	Capacity / details	Notes
Arafura Stadium		Athletics	Class 2 World Athletics-certified facility	Used for school carnivals, Northern Territory titles, and regional championships.
Darwin Clay Target Club		Clay target shooting		Shooting venue that provides facilities for a range of clay target disciplines, including skeet, trap, double trap, sporting clays and tower events.
Darwin Football Stadium	Larrakia Park	Soccer	~6,000	Home to Darwin Olympic SC. Has staged A-League Men pre-season fixtures, Australia Cup ties, and national youth tournaments.
Darwin Indoor Stadium		Basketball, Netball, Volleyball, Badminton, Futsal	Four indoor courts	Home of Darwin Basketball Association competitions. Also used by Northern Territory representative teams.
Darwin International Tennis Centre		Tennis	16 outdoor courts (including show court)	Opened in 2018 as the main tennis facility in Darwin. Hosts Tennis NT competitions, the annual Darwin Tennis International, and community coaching programs.
Darwin Squash Centre		Squash	12 courts	Opened in 2012 as the main squash facility in Darwin.
Jingili BMX Club		BMX racing	Competition-standard BMX track	Established in the 1980s and affiliated with AusCycling. The club organises local race meets, state championships, and provides junior development pathways.
Marrara Cricket Ground (MCG)	DXC Arena, PINT Park	Cricket, Australian rules football	~10,000	Hosts local cricket and has staged first-class and List A matches, and NTFL games. Home of PINT Football Club in the NTFL and PINT Cricket Club in the Darwin & Districts Cricket Competition.
Marrara Cricket Ground 2 (MCG 2)	DXC Arena 2	Cricket, Australian rules football		Hosts local cricket and Australian rules football matches.
Marrara Hockey Centre		Field hockey	2 synthetic turf pitches	Home of the Darwin Hockey Association. Has staged national championships and Arafura Games events.
Marrara Oval	TIO Stadium, Marrara Stadium, Football Park	Australian rules football, Rugby league, Rugby union	~12,500	The largest stadium in the Northern Territory. Hosts AFL premiership matches, NTFL fixtures, and international rugby league Test matches. Has hosted international cricket, including two Test matches, four One Day Internationals and two Twenty20 Internationals.
Marrara Oval 2	TIO Oval 2	Australian rules football		Hosts NTFL matches.
Northern Territory Sports Academy (NTSA) facilities		Multi-sport training	Specialist training facilities	Provides high-performance programs for elite athletes across athletics, netball, football, and other sports.
Rinaldi Park	Azzurri Stadium, Italian Club Stadium	Soccer	Community-level ground	Home ground of Azzurri United FC, competing in the NorZone Premier League. Also used for junior development and community tournaments.
Rugby Park	Skyring Rugby Park	Rugby union	Community-level ground	Home of the Northern Territory Rugby Union, hosting club competitions, regional carnivals, and training for representative sides.
Territory Netball Stadium	CDU Stadium	Netball	2,000 (show court)	Main venue for Netball Northern Territory and representative matches.
Territory Rugby League Stadium	Warren Park	Rugby league	~3,000	Built in 2019 as a purpose-built rugby league venue. Hosts Northern Territory Rugby League matches and has staged National Rugby League pre-season trials.

== See also ==
- Sport in the Northern Territory
- Marrara, Northern Territory
- List of stadiums in Australia
