= Pakistan A cricket team against Bangladesh High Performance XI in Australia in 2024 =

International cricket tour

Pakistan A against Bangladesh High Performance XI in Australia in 2024
	Bangladesh HP XI	Pakistan Shaheens
- Dates: 19 – 29 July 2024
Captains	Shahadat Hossain	Sahibzada Farhan

FC series
- Result: 2 (unofficial)-match series drawn 1–1
Most runs	Aich Mollah (187)	Mohammad Huraira (218)
Most wickets	Ripon Mondol (7)	Khurram Shahzad (13)

The Pakistan A cricket team toured Australia in July 2024 to play the Bangladesh HP XI. The bilateral series consisted of two four-day matches. The series was hosted by the Northern Territory Cricket Association on behalf of the Bangladesh Cricket Board (BCB).

The four-day matches were used by Bangladesh to prepare their Test players for their upcoming ICC World Test Championship fixtures against Pakistan and India. In June 2024, the Pakistan Cricket Board announced the dates of the bilateral series. Pakistan A arrived in Darwin on 14 July 2024.

Following the bilateral fixtures, a tri-nation series was also held involving the two teams along with the Northern Territory cricket team. All the matches of the tour took place in Darwin, Northern Territory, marking Pakistan A's second successive Darwin tour.

== Squads ==
Bangladesh HP XI	Pakistan A
Shahadat Hossain (c); Mahidul Islam Ankon (wk); Parvez Hossain Emon; Amite Hasan; Ariful Islam; Mukidul Islam; Shadman Islam; Aich Mollah; Hasan Murad; Ripon Mondol; Rejaur Rahman Raja	Sahibzada Farhan (c); Haseebullah Khan (wk); Hunain Shah; Kamran Ghulam; Kashif Ali; Khurram Shahzad; Mehran Mumtaz; Mohammad Huraira; Mubasir Khan; Irfan Khan; Omair Yousuf; Shahnawaz Dahani; Tayyab Tahir; Umar Amin; Mohammad Ali

== Four-day series ==
=== 1st four-day match ===
19–22 July 2024
Scorecard

Pakistan Shaheens	v	Bangladesh HP XI
467/3d (96.1 overs); Mohammad Huraira 218 (247); Ripon Mondol 2/84 (21 overs)		266 (76.2 overs); Shadman Islam 88 (167); Khurram Shahzad 6/72 (21.2 overs)
226/3d Omair Yousuf 100* (123); Ripon Mondol 1/38 (11 overs)		279 (86.2 overs); Amite Hasan 71 (102); Mehran Mumtaz 4/84 (24 overs)

Pakistan Shaheens won by 148 runs
Marrara Cricket Ground, Darwin
Umpires: Imran Muhammad (Aus) and Rob Stewart (Aus)

- Bangladesh HP XI won the toss and elected to field.

=== 2nd four-day match ===
26–29 July 2024
Scorecard

Bangladesh HP XI	v	Pakistan Shaheens
258 (67.3 overs); Mahmudul Hasan Joy 69 (90); Khurram Shahzad 3/69 (17 overs)		179 (67.2 overs); Kamran Ghulam 48 (75); Ripon Mondol 4/71 (24.2 overs)
216 (70.1 overs); Mahmudul Hasan Joy 65 (118); Mohammad Ali 6/63 (24.1 overs)		290 (93.2 overs); Sahibzada Farhan 68 (70); Mahmudul Hasan Joy 5/21 (13 overs)

Bangladesh HP XI won by 5 runs
Marrara Cricket Ground, Darwin
Umpires: John Ginnane (Aus) and Imran Muhammad (Aus)

- Pakistan Shaheens won the toss and elected to field.

== 50-overs Tri-series ==
=== Points table ===
Pos	Team	Pld	W	L	NR	Pts	NRR	Result
1	Pakistan Shaheens	2	2	0	0	4	2.056	Champion
2	Bangladesh HP XI	2	1	1	0	2	0.041	
3	Northern Territory Strike	2	0	2	0	0	−1.814	

Source: Cricclubs

=== 1st 50-overs match ===
1 August 2024
13:00
Scorecard

Bangladesh HP XI; 250	v	Northern Territory Strike; 138 (42 overs)
Tanzid Hasan 53 (64); Hamish Martin 4/34 (10 overs)		Jacob Dickman 51 (87); Mahfuzur Rahman Rabby 2/17 (7 overs)

Bangladesh HP XI won by 112 runs
Marrara Oval, Darwin
Player of the match: Hamish Martin (Northern Territory Strike)

- Northern Territory Strike won the toss and elected to field.

=== 2nd 50-overs match ===
4 August 2024
10:00
Scorecard

Northern Territory Strike; 142 (46.1 overs)	v	Pakistan Shaheens; 143/6 (35.1 overs)
Jagadeswara Koduru 59 (80); Jahandad Khan 4/26 (8.1 overs)		Mubassir Khan 32* (72); Matt Hammond 2/29 (10 overs)

Pakistan Shaheens won by 4 wickets
Gardens Oval, Darwin
Player of the match: Mubassir Khan (Pakistan Shaheens)

- Northern Territory Strike won the toss and elected to bat.

=== 3rd 50-overs match ===
6 August 2024
10:30
Scorecard

Bangladesh HP XI; 78 (24.3 overs)	v	Pakistan Shaheens; 79/2 (17 overs)
Parvez Emon 19 (30); Mohammad Imran 3/22 (8 overs)		Usman Khan 39* (45); Ripon Mondol 2/30 (5 overs)

Pakistan Shaheens won by 8 wickets
Marrara Cricket Ground, Darwin
Player of the match: Mohammad Imran (Pakistan Shaheens)

- Pakistan Shaheens won the toss and elected to field.
