= Top End T20 Series =

T20 cricket league played in Northern Territory, Australia

- Countries: Australia
- Administrator: Northern Territory Cricket
- Format: Twenty20
- First edition: 2022
- Latest edition: 2025
- Next edition: 2027
- Tournament format: Round-robin and playoffs
- Current champion: Adelaide Strikers Academy (2nd title)
- Most successful: Adelaide Strikers Academy (2 title)
- Most runs: Teague Wyllie (559)
- Most wickets: Tim Oakley (28)
- Website: www.ntcricket.com.au
- 2026

Top End T20 Series is a Twenty20 cricket tournament that takes place in the Northern Territory of Australia. It is organised by Northern Territory Cricket, sanctioned by Cricket Australia and was first contested during 2022.

The league is played before the Big Bash League every year, and acts as a pre-season tournament for the BBL.

== History ==
The competition was launched in 2022. It aims to make up for the absence of high-profile cricket in Northern Territory, and to act as a showcase for players from the Territory.

=== 2022 Season ===
The league's first season took place from 12 to 21 August 2022. The teams which competed were Cricket Australia XI, Melbourne Stars Academy, Melbourne Renegades Academy, Northern Territory Strike and Papua New Guinea. The final was held on 21 August, at Gardens Oval, Darwin, with Cricket Australia XI defeating Melbourne Stars Academy by 30 runs. Cricket Australia XI won the inaugural Top End T20 Series title.

=== 2023 Season ===
The 2023 Top End T20 Series took place from 30 July to 6 August 2023 in Darwin, Northern Territory. The teams which competed were Northern Territory Strike, Pakistan Shaheens, ACT Comets, Melbourne Stars Academy, Melbourne Renegades Academy and Papua New Guinea. The tournament featured six teams, with the top two sides progressing to the final. The final was held on 6 August at Marrara Oval, with Northern Territory Strike defeating Pakistan Shaheens by 46 runs. Northern Territory Strike scored 185/4, with Jack Wood scoring an unbeaten 101, before restricting Pakistan Shaheens to 139/7. Jack Wood was named player of the match.

=== 2024 Season ===
The 2024 Top End T20 Series took place from 9 to 18 August 2024 in Darwin, Northern Territory. The teams which competed were Adelaide Strikers, Melbourne Renegades, Perth Scorchers, Tasmania Tigers, Northern Territory Strike, Pakistan Shaheens, Bangladesh A and Northern Territory representative sides. The tournament was expanded to eight teams in 2024, including four Big Bash League teams and two overseas representative sides. The final was held on 18 August at Marrara Oval, with Adelaide Strikers defeating Perth Scorchers to win the Top End T20 Series title.

=== 2025 Season ===
The 2025 Top End T20 Series took place from 14 to 24 August 2025 in Darwin, Northern Territory. The tournament featured a record number of teams, with Big Bash League academies and international representative sides taking part. The teams included Perth Scorchers Academy, Adelaide Strikers Academy, Melbourne Renegades Academy, Melbourne Stars Academy, Hobart Hurricanes Academy, Northern Territory Strike, Pakistan Shaheens and the Americas representative side. The series was streamed live and free on 7plus. Perth Scorchers Academy won the tournament after defeating Adelaide Strikers Academy in the final to claim the 2025 Top End T20 Series title. The tournament produced a number of notable performances and statistical milestones, which were highlighted by Cricket Australia in its review of the 2025 competition. The series continued the tournament's international growth, with the inclusion of the Americas team making it part of the Top End T20 Series' increasingly global field.

=== 2026 Season ===
The 2026 Top End T20 Series took place from 21 to 30 August 2026 in Darwin, Northern Territory. The tournament was expanded to nine teams, with Big Bash League academy sides joined by domestic and international representative teams. The teams which competed were Adelaide Strikers Academy, ACT Comets, Bangladesh High Performance, Hobart Hurricanes Academy, New Zealand A, Northern Territory Strike, Nepal A, Victoria Academy and HH Kingsmen. New Zealand A made their first appearance in the competition, while Bangladesh made their third consecutive appearance.

Northern Territory Strike were coached by Johan Botha, who was appointed ahead of the tournament, while D’Arcy Short returned as captain for the 2026 competition. The final was held on 30 August at Marrara Stadium, Darwin, with Adelaide Strikers Academy defeating Victoria Academy by 25 runs to win the Top End T20 Series 2nd title. Adelaide Strikers Academy scored 177/5 from their 20 overs, with Harry Nielsen scoring 72 not out, before Victoria CA XI were restricted to 152/8. Henry Thornton took four wickets for Adelaide Strikers Academy, while Nielsen was named player of the match.

== Results ==
Season	Final venue	Final			Matches	Teams	Source
Season	Final venue	Winner	Result	Runner-up	Matches	Teams	Source
2022	Gardens Oval, Darwin	Cricket Australia XI	Cricket Australia XI won by 30 runs	Melbourne Stars Academy	11	5	Scorecard
2023	Marrara Oval, Darwin	NT Strike	NT Strike won by 46 runs	Pakistan Shaheens	16	6	Scorecard
2024	Marrara Oval, Darwin	Adelaide Strikers Academy	Adelaide Strikers Academy won by 32 runs	Bangladesh HP XI	30	9	Scorecard
2025	Marrara Oval, Darwin	Perth Scorchers Academy	Perth Scorchers Academy won by 15 runs	Adelaide Strikers Academy	36	11	Scorecard
2026	DXC Arena, Darwin	Adelaide Strikers Academy	Adelaide Strikers Academy won by 25 runs	Cricket Victoria	30	9	Scorecard

== Team summary by season ==
Team	Country	2022 (5)	2023 (6)	2024 (9)	2025 (11)	2026 (9)
ACT Comets	Australia	–	6th	9th	11th	8th
Adelaide Strikers Academy	Australia	–		W	RU	W
Bangladesh HP XI	Bangladesh	–		RU	–	3rd
Bangladesh A	Bangladesh	–			9th	–
Chicago Kingsmen	United States	–			3rd	–
Cricket Australia XI	Australia	W	–			
Cricket Victoria	Australia	–				RU
Hobart Hurricanes Academy	Australia	–			10th	9th
Hyderabad Kingsmen Academy	Pakistan	–				6th
Melbourne Renegades Academy	Australia	3rd	3rd	6th	7th	–
Melbourne Stars Academy	Australia	RU	4th	7th	5th	–
Nepal	Nepal	–			8th	–
Nepal A	Nepal	–				7th
New Zealand A	New Zealand	–				4th
NT Strike	Australia	4th	W	4th	6th	5th
Pakistan Shaheens	Pakistan	–	RU	3rd	4th	–
Papua New Guinea	Papua New Guinea	5th	5th	–		
Perth Scorchers Academy	Australia	–		8th	W	–
Tasmania	Australia	–		5th	–	

== Broadcasting ==
The league will be broadcast live on the following channels.

Region(s)/countries	Streaming rights
Australia	7plus
New Zealand	NZC YouTube Channel
India	FanCode
Bangladesh	T Sports
Pakistan	Tamasha
West Asia & North Africa	MYCO
Nepal	DGo
Sri Lanka	Styx Sports
Afghanistan	Styx Sports
United States Canada	Willow
United Kingdom	Apex Sports
Rest of the world	Apex Sports; NZC YouTube Channel
