= Top End Australian Football Association =

The Top End Australian Football Association (TEAFA) was an amateur Australian rules football competition in the Northern Territory, Australia.

More recently in 2010/11, the TEAFA merged with the NTFL creating a three tiered competition with teams being represented in Premier Division and Division 1 and 2.

== Clubs ==
=== Final ===
Club	Colours	Nickname	Home Ground	Former League	Est.	Years in TEAFA	TEAFA Senior Premierships		Fate
Club	Colours	Nickname	Home Ground	Former League	Est.	Years in TEAFA	Total	Most recent	Fate
Banks		Bulldogs	Gardens Oval, The Gardens	NTFL	1978	1982/83-2009/10	8	1983/84, 1985/86, 1991/92, 1992/93, 1997/98, 2000/01, 2004/05, 2007/08	Joined NTFL in 2010/11
Casino (MGM Casino 2003/04, SkyCity 2004/05-?)		Sharks	Gardens Oval, The Gardens	–	1991	1991/92-1995/96, 1998/99, 2003/04-2009/10	0	-	Recesses in 1996/97-1997/98 and 1999/00-2002/03. Joined NTFL in 2010/11 as Mindil
Combined Services		Services		NTFL	1978	1982/83-1990, 2004-2007, 2009/10	0	-	Joined NTFL in 2010/11
Olympic		Spartans	Gardens Oval, The Gardens			?-2009/10	0	-	Joined NTFL in 2010/11
PINT		Greenants	DXC Arena, Marrara	–	1981	1982/83-2009/10	5	1986/87, 1987/88, 1990/91, 2008/09, 2009/10	Joined NTFL in 2010/11
Tracy Village (East Darwin 1982/83-1984/85)	(1982-?)(?-2010)	Razorbacks	Tracy Village Oval, Lyons	NTFL	1978	1982/83-2009/10	1	2006/07	Joined NTFL in 2010/11
University		Rats	Marrara Oval No 2, Marrara	–	1989	1990/91-2009/10	9	1993/94, 1994/95, 1995/96, 1996/97, 1988/99, 1999/00, 2001/02, 2002/03, 2003/04	Joined NTFL in 2010/11
Waratah thirds		Warriors	Gardens Oval, The Gardens	–	1916	2009/10	0	-	Joined NTFL in 2010/11

=== Former ===
Club	Colours	Nickname	Home Ground	Former League	Est.	Years in TEAFA	TEAFA Senior Premierships		Fate
Club	Colours	Nickname	Home Ground	Former League	Est.	Years in TEAFA	Total	Years	Fate
Bagot				–	1985	1985/86-1986/87	0	-	Folded after 1986/87 season
Belyuen			Belyuen Oval, Belyuen	–	1990	1990/91, 1992/93-1995/96	0	-	Recess in 1991/92. Folded after 1995/96 season
Correctional Services (Corserv)		Magpies		–	1989	1989/90-1990/91	0	-	Folded after 1989/90 season
Demons		Demons		–	2004	2004/05-2006/07	1	2005/06	Folded after 2006/07 season
Garden Point			Pirlangimpi Oval, Pirlangimpi	–	1993	1993/94-1995/96	0	-	Folded after 1995/96 season
Gunbalanya			Gunbalanya Oval, Gunbalanya	–	1993	1993/94-1995/96, 1997/98, 1999/00	0	-	Folded after 1999/00 season
Jabiru		Bombers	Brockman Oval, Jabiru	–	1982	1982/83-2004/05	2	1988/89, 1989/90	Recess between 2004/05 and 2014/15. Re-formed in NTFL for 2015/16 season
Katherine		Roos	Katherine Oval, Katherine	–	1982	1982/83-1984/85	2	1982/83, 1984/85	Moved to NTFL B-grade in 1985/86
Palmerston Falcons		Falcons	Cazaly's Arena, Durack	–	1991	1991/92-1995/96, 1998/99	0	-	Absorbed by Palmerston in 1999/00
Palmerston thirds		Magpies	Cazaly's Arena, Durack	–	1972	1999/00-2000/01	0	-	Disbanded after 2000/01 season
RSL		Razzle		–	1983	1983/84, 1986/87-1988/89	0	-	Recess between 1984/85 and 1985/86. Folded after 1988/89 season
Southern Districts		Crocs	Norbuilt Oval, Freds Pass	–	1981	1983/84-1984/85	0	-	Joined NTFL in 1987/88

== Premierships ==
Year	Club	G	P	B	Opponents	G	P	B
NTFL C Grade
1978/79	Combined Services	10	15	75	North Darwin	6	6	42
1979/80	North Darwin	7	9	51	Banks	7	5	47
1980/81	Combined Services	6	8	44	Banks	4	11	35
1981/82	Banks			N/A	Combined Services			N/A
NTFA
1982/83	Katherine	5	16	46	Pints	6	6	42
1983/84	Banks	9	14	68	PINT	7	10	52
1984/85	Katherine	11	10	76	Banks	7	10	52
1985/86	Banks	24	10	154	PINT	7	8	50
1986/87	PINT	14	13	97	Banks	10	11	71
1987/88	PINT	5	4	34	Jabiru	3	6	24
1988/89	Jabiru	19	11	125	PINT	10	4	64
1989/90	Jabiru	15	11	101	Banks	8	4	52
1990/91	PINT	11	12	78	Banks	8	4	52
1991/92	Banks	13	14	92	PINT	5	11	41
1992/93	Banks	15	11	101	University	9	8	62
1993/94	University	17	9	111	Jabiru	9	9	63
1994/95	University	10	8	68	PINT	5	6	36
1995/96	University	10	15	75	Banks	5	1	31
1996/97	University	18	5	113	PINT	10	2	62
1997/98	Banks	5	11	41	University	5	5	35
1998/99	University	15	17	107	Banks	7	7	49
1999/00	University	11	9	75	Banks	7	7	49
TEAFA
2000/01	Banks	10	8	68	University	2	5	17
2001/02	University	10	9	69	Banks	5	7	37
2002/03	University	9	7	61	Banks	7	8	50
2003/04	University	14	8	92	PINT	2	4	16
2004/05	Banks	17	9	111	Tracy Village	7	11	53
2005/06	Demons	13	11	89	Banks	10	11	71
2006/07	Tracy Village	8	7	55	Banks	5	19	49
2007/08	Banks	15	8	98	PINT	14	7	91
2008/09	PINT	11	10	76	Banks	4	3	27
2009/10	PINT	17	15	117	Banks	13	6	84

== See also ==
- AFL Northern Territory
- Northern Territory Football League
