= Territory Storm =

Australian netball team

- Founded: 2008
- Based in: Darwin
- Regions: Northern Territory
- Home venue: Territory Netball Stadium
- League: Australian Netball Championships
Uniform

Territory Storm, also referred to as Northern Territory Storm or NT Storm, is an Australian netball team that represents Netball Northern Territory in the Australian Netball Championships (previously the Australian Netball League). Territory Storm played in the ANL between 2008 and 2019, and in the ANC from 2023. Between 2017 and 2019 they formed a partnership with Sunshine Coast Lightning and were effectively Lightning's reserve team.

== History ==
=== Australian Netball League ===
Between 2008 and 2019, Territory Storm played in the Australian Netball League. They were founder members of the ANL. In December 2015, Netball Northern Territory announced that they were temporarily withdrawing Storm from the ANL league due to a lack of proper playing facilities and the cost of traveling interstate for away matches.

After missing the 2016 ANL season, Territory Storm rejoined in 2017 after forming a partnership with Sunshine Coast Lightning. Between 2017 and 2019 they were effectively Lightning's reserve team. In 2018 Storm won their first game in six years. In 2019, with a team featuring Lightning players Cara Koenen, Annika Lee-Jones, Peace Proscovia, and Jacqui Russell, Storm enjoyed one of their best seasons, winning six matches and finishing fifth.

=== Australian Netball Championships ===
In July 2021, Territory Storm was not included among the teams listed to participate in the inaugural Australian Netball Championships. Their former partners, Sunshine Coast Lightning, opted to enter their own team.

The Storm returned to the national netball stage by playing in the ANC in 2023, finishing last in their pool with no wins.

Regular season statistics

Season	Position	Won	Drawn	Lost
2008				
2009	8th	3	7	0
2010				
2011				
2012				
2013				
2014				
2015				
2017				
2018		1		
2019	5th	6		
2023	11th	0	0	5

== Home venues ==
Territory Storm initially played their home games at various venues in and around Marrara, Northern Territory. These included outdoor courts, the Marrara Indoor Stadium and Darwin Basketball Association courts. They have occasionally played home games in Alice Springs. During their partnership with Sunshine Coast Lightning, Storm also played homes games at USC Stadium, usually as part of a double header. In 2019 they played home games at the Territory Netball Stadium.

== Notable players ==
=== Internationals ===
Australia

- Joanne Morgan

Australia Fast5

- Karyn Bailey
- Samantha Poolman

England

- Ama Agbeze

Scotland

- Fiona Themann

Uganda

- Peace Proscovia

New Zealand women's basketball

- Kate McMeeken-Ruscoe

=== Sunshine Coast Lightning ===
- Cara Koenen
- Annika Lee-Jones
- Peace Proscovia
- Jacqui Russell

=== Suncorp Super Netball ===
- Kate Eddy
- Beryl Friday

== Head coaches ==
Coach	Years
Stacey West	2008–2009
Dianne Brown	2010–2012
Ronelle Van Dongen	2013
Donna Stewart	2015–2017
Penny Shearer	2018
Christine Voge	2018–2019
