= Guy Brown (cricketer) =

Australian cricketer

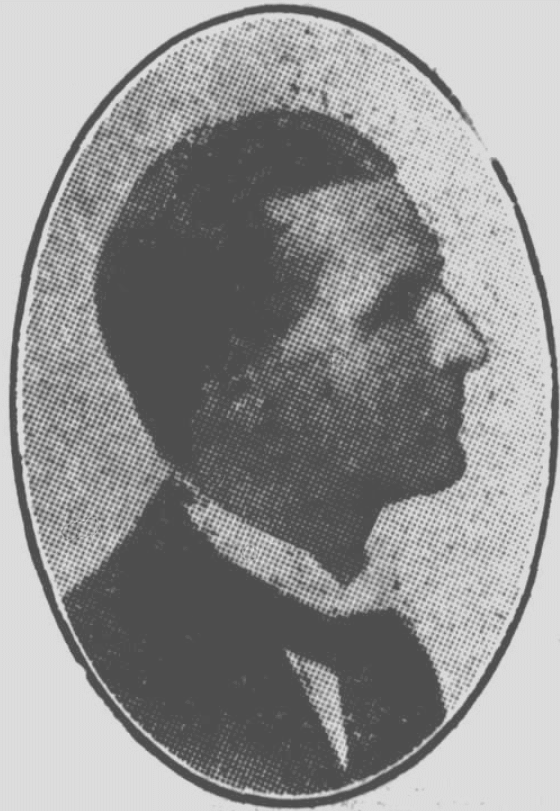

Personal information
- Born: 31 July 1884; Ipswich, Queensland, Australia
- Died: 21 March 1958 (aged 73); New Farm, Queensland, Australia
- Source: Cricinfo, 1 October 2020

Guy Brown (31 July 1884 – 21 March 1958) was an Australian cricketer. He played in five first-class matches for Queensland between 1906 and 1909.

Brown was raised in Dalby in his early life but was sent to Ipswich Grammar for his later studies. Sammy Jones was Ipswich Grammar's cricket coach and Brown was trained by him while at the school going on to be elected the schools cricket captain from 1899 to 1901. After graduating he played in Brisbane Grade Cricket initially for the Bundamba Cricket Club for a few months, then for two seasons with North Brisbane before joining Toombul who he scored four centuries in a single season with.

In 1906, Brown was selected in the Queensland state team and he remained a member of the state side until 1910 when he was transferred to Maryborough in his professional career working for the Commercial Bank of Sydney. He continued playing cricket for Maryborough performing well as an all-rounder and being described as the best fieldsman in Queensland however he was later transferred to various posts as bank manager across Queensland and New South Wales.

In 1921, Brown retired from banking to found his own business and in 1922 he became Secretary of the Queensland Cricket Association.

== See also ==
- List of Queensland first-class cricketers
