= Imparja Cup =

Series of Australian cricket tournaments

Imparja Cup & National Indigenous Cricket Championships
- Administrator: Cricket Australia
- Format: One Day, Twenty20, Super 8, 6-a-side Indoor Cricket
- First edition: 1994 (2001 as a national competition)
- Tournament format: Round-robin and Playoff final
- Current champion: NICC Men: Queensland; NICC Women: Western Australia; Major Centres: Alice Springs; Community Men's: Reclink Rebels; Community Women's: Bush Potatoes
- Most successful: NICC Men: Queensland (7 titles); NICC Women: NSW (7 titles); Major Centres: Darwin (5 titles); Community Men's: Reclink Rebels/All Sorts (2 titles); Community Women's: Bush Potatoes (6 titles)
- Website: http://www.nicc.cricket.com.au

The Imparja Cup and National Indigenous Cricket Championships are Australian cricket tournaments based in Alice Springs, Northern Territory. The 2025 edition was held in Mackay. The tournaments are contested annually by teams of Indigenous Australian cricketers.

== History ==
The Imparja Cup tournament has its origins in an annual match started in 1994 between Alice Springs and Tennant Creek by Shane and Mervyn Franey from Alice Springs and Ross Williams from Tennant Creek. By 1998 Northern Territory Cricket had become involved in organising the tournament and in 2001 Cricket Australia turned the tournament into a national competition. Imparja Television has been involved in the annual match and the national tournament since 1994. In 2016, Cricket Australia re-formatted the State and Territory Division to become the National Indigenous Cricket Championships, to set the pathway for aspiring indigenous cricketers looking to play first-class cricket. Also, an Indoor Cricket division was introduced into the Imparja Cup in 2016 as to allow more playing opportunities for Community sides.

== Format ==
In its current format there are six divisions in the Imparja Cup and National Indigenous Cricket Championships together. The NICC Men's Division is played as a One Day and Twenty20 round-robin tournament with the two top teams playing off in a One Day limited overs final.

The NICC Women's Division is played as a Twenty20 round-robin tournament with the top two teams playing off in a Twenty20 final.

Teams in the Major Centres Division play Twenty20 cricket whilst the Community Men's Division and Community Women's Division both play a shorter, 14-over format in Super 8s.

The Indoor Cricket format sees teams play a fast-paced 6-a-side format.

== Media ==
Since 2009, the tournament has been covered on National Indigenous Television.

You may also view the Northern Territory Cricket YouTube channel to view footage from the Imparja Cup.

== Winners ==
Year	Host	National Indigenous Cricket Cup		Imparja Cup			
Year	Host	Men's Division	Women's Division	Major Centres Division	Community Men's Division	Community Women's Division	Indoor Cricket
2026	Mackay	Western Australia	Victoria	?	?	?	—
2025	Mackay	Queensland	Western Australia	?	?	?	—
2024	Alice Springs	Western Australia	New South Wales	Yeperenye Shopping Centre	South Alice Springs Sporting Club	Golden Sistas	—
2023	Alice Springs	New South Wales	Queensland	?	?	?	—
2021–22	Alice Springs	Cancelled due to the COVID-19 pandemic					
2020	Alice Springs	New South Wales	New South Wales	?	?	?	
2019	Alice Springs	New South Wales	New South Wales	Darwin Barra's	?	?	–
2018	Alice Springs	New South Wales	New South Wales	Desert Eagles	Brothers in Arms	Bush Potatoes	–
2017	Alice Springs	Victoria	New South Wales	Tennant Creek	Red Centre Wranglers	Bush Potatoes	?
2016	Alice Springs	New South Wales	New South Wales	Alice Springs	Reclink Rebels	Bush Potatoes	Anmatjere Eagles
2015	Alice Springs	Western Australia	New South Wales	All Sorts	Reclink Rebels	Bush Potatoes	–
2014	Alice Springs	Western Australia	New South Wales	Darwin	All Sorts	Bush Potatoes	–
2013	Alice Springs	Queensland	New South Wales	Darwin	All Sorts	Bush Potatoes	–
2012	Alice Springs	New South Wales	New South Wales	Darwin	Brothers in Arms	Bush Potatoes	–
2011	Alice Springs	New South Wales	New South Wales	Maranoa Murris	Gap Angels	Bush Potatoes	–
2010	Alice Springs	Western Australia	New South Wales	Alkupitja	Tanami Flying Miners	–	–
2009	Alice Springs	Queensland	New South Wales	Alkupitja	Tangentyere	New South Wales	–
2008	Alice Springs	Queensland	New South Wales	Katherine	Cooktown	New South Wales	–
2007	Alice Springs	New South Wales	–	Alkupitja	Cat Tigers	CGA Cougars	–
2006	Alice Springs	Queensland	–	Alice Springs	Melville Island	Darwin	–
2005	Alice Springs	Queensland	–	Alice Springs	Alkupitja	Darwin	–
2004	Alice Springs	Queensland	–	Alice Springs	Normanton	Tennant Creek	–
2003	Alice Springs	New South Wales	–	Darwin	–	–	–
2002	Alice Springs	Northern Territory	–	Darwin	–	–	–
2001	Alice Springs	Tasmania	–	–	–	–	–
