= Bangladesh High Performance XI =

- Bangladesh HP XI
- Nickname: BCB HP XI

Personnel
- Captain: Irfaan Shukkur
- Coach: N/A
- Owner: Bangladesh Cricket Board (BCB)

Team information
- Founded: 2004

History
- First-class debut: Pakistan Shaheens in 19 July 2024 at Marrara Cricket Ground, Darwin
- Official website: tigercricket.com.bd

The Bangladesh High Performance XI, also known as Bangladesh HP XI, is a cricket team representing Bangladesh, and is the third tier of international Bangladeshi cricket, below the full Bangladesh men's national cricket team. The team played its first game against the Pakistan Shaheens, at Marrara Cricket Ground on 19 July 2024.

== Squads ==
The Bangladesh Cricket Board named a 15-member squad captained by wicketkeeper-batter Irfaan Shukkur for the 2026 Top End T20 Series in Darwin, Australia.

1. Abdul Gaffar
2. Abu Hider
3. Ariful Islam
4. Habibur Rahman
5. Irfaan Shukkur (c, wk)
6. Jishan Alam
7. Mohammad Rubel
8. SM Meherob
9. Ripon Mondol
10. Mrittunjoy Chowdhury
11. Rakibul Hasan
12. Rohanat Doullah Borson
13. Sabbir Rahman
14. Samiun Basir
15. Shamim Hossain

== Honours ==
- Top End T20 Series:
  - Runners-up (1): 2024

== See also ==
- Bangladesh under-19 cricket team
- Bangladesh under-23 cricket team
- Bangladesh A cricket team
- Bangladesh Cricket Board XI
