= Cricket Australia =

Cricket organisation in Australia

- Sport: Cricket
- Jurisdiction: Australia
- Abbreviation: CA
- Founded: 1905; 121 years ago, incorporated 1982
- Affiliation: International Cricket Council
- Affiliation date: 1909; 117 years ago
- Regional affiliation: East Asia-Pacific
- Affiliation date: 1996; 30 years ago
- Headquarters: Jolimont, Melbourne, Australia
- Chairman: Mike Baird
- CEO: Todd Greenberg
- Operating income: ▲ -$11.3 million (2025 loss)
- Sponsor: Principal Partner: Westpac; Platinum Partners: NRMA Insurance, KFC, Toyota; Gold Partners: Woolworths, Asics, Bet365, Qantas, Liquorland, Aussie Broadband, HCLTech; Silver Partners: Gatorade, Marsh, Kookaburra, Nu-Pure

Official website
- www.cricket.com.au
- (Australia)

Cricket Australia (CA) is a company which operates some professional and amateur cricket competitions and teams in Australia. It had its origins in the 'Australian Board of Control for International Cricket', formed in 1905. The company was incorporated in 1982, with members' liability limited by guarantee.

It operates its men's Australia national cricket team, Australia women's national cricket team and Australia national under-19 cricket team, Australia A cricket team, along with other national-level teams (such as Indigenous, disability or over-age teams) in conjunction with the relevant organisations. It also organises and hosts Test matches, One-Day Internationals and Twenty20 Internationals in association with other national cricket organisations, and schedules home international fixtures.

It deals with the Australian Cricketers' Association regarding player's rights, pay and work agreements and welfare requirements.

== Membership and governance ==
Cricket Australia has six member organisations:

- New South Wales – Cricket NSW
- Queensland – Queensland Cricket
- South Australia – South Australian Cricket Association
- Tasmania – Cricket Tasmania
- Victoria – Cricket Victoria
- Western Australia – Western Australian Cricket

Cricket ACT and Northern Territory Cricket are non-member associations, although the ACT participates in Cricket Australia tournaments such as the Women's National Cricket League and the Futures League, and previously briefly also competed in the domestic limited-overs competition.

It is governed by nine independent directors. The chief executive officer reports to the board of directors.

== National teams ==
Men's Test team: Australia played in the first-ever Test match against England in 1877 and has since become one of the most successful teams in Test cricket history. Australia has been a full member of the International Cricket Council (ICC) since its inception in 1909. As of April 2025, the Men's Test team is captained by Pat Cummins.

Men's white-ball team: Australia played their first One-Day International in 1971 and has since won multiple ICC tournaments, including five World Cups. As of April 2025, Pat Cummins leads the ODI side, while Mitchell Marsh captains the T20I team.

Women's team: Australia played their first Women's Test match against England in 1934. They have won multiple Women's World Cups and T20 World Cups. As of April 2025, the team is captained by Alyssa Healy.

Under-19s team: Men's U-19 and Women's U-19 teams regularly compete in the ICC Under-19 Cricket World Cups. The most recent captains (2024) are Hugh Weibgen for the men's team and Meg Lanning has joined as a mentor for the women's team.

Reserves (A team): The Australia A is the second-tier men's team, focusing on developing players and providing them with exposure through tours and warm-up matches. The team plays in various formats to prepare players for the senior team.

Disability teams: Cricket Australia is committed to creating inclusive environments for people with disabilities. The teams administered by Cricket Australia include:

- Blind

These teams participate in various national and international competitions, promoting the growth of cricket among players with disabilities.

== Domestic teams ==
Each of Cricket Australia's state member organisations select a team to participate in its domestic cricket tournaments every season.

State	Men's side	Team name	Women's side	Team name
New South Wales	New South Wales Men's Cricket Team	Blues	New South Wales Women's Cricket Team	
Queensland	Queensland Men's Cricket Team	Bulls	Queensland Women's Cricket Team	Fire
South Australia	South Australia Men's Cricket Team	Southern Redbacks	South Australia Women's Cricket Team	Scorpions
Tasmania	Tasmania Men's Cricket Team	Tigers	Tasmania Women's Cricket Team	Roar
Victoria	Victoria Men's Cricket Team	Bushrangers	Victoria Women's Cricket Team	
Western Australia	Western Australia Men's Cricket Team	Warriors	Western Australia Women's Cricket Team	
Territory	Men's side		Women's side	
Australian Capital Territory	Australian Capital Territory Men's Cricket Team	Comets	Australian Capital Territory Women's Cricket Team	Meteors
Northern Territory	Northern Territory Men's Division		Northern Territory Women's Division	

== Domestic tournaments ==
Tournament	Format	Teams	Notes
Sheffield Shield	First-Class	6 state teams	Premier men's first-class competition in Australia.
One-Day Cup (Dean Jones Trophy)	List A (50 overs)	6 state teams	Renamed in honor of Dean Jones; South Australia clinched the title.
Women's National Cricket League (WNCL)	50 overs	6 state teams + ACT	Premier women's 50-over competition; New South Wales were the champions.
KFC Big Bash League (BBL)	T20	8 city-based franchises	Australia's premier men's T20 league.
Weber Women's Big Bash League (WBBL)	T20	8 city-based franchises	
Under-19 Male National Championships	50 overs	State teams	Developmental tournament for U-19 male cricketers.
Under-19 Female National Championships	50 overs	State teams	Developmental tournament for U-19 female cricketers.

== History ==
Early tours by cricket teams from Australia to England were organised and funded by private groups or by the players themselves. Similarly, invitations to English teams were made by private promoters or by individual clubs, such as the Melbourne Cricket Club. These early tours were lucrative for the players and promoters and cricket administrators looked to find ways to channel some of this money to the state associations and major clubs.

In 1892, the Australasian Cricket Council, composed of representatives from the New South Wales, South Australian and Victorian cricket associations, was formed but disbanded in 1898. Its one lasting action was to establish the Sheffield Shield, the first-class cricket competition between the Australian colonies.

In January 1905, formal discussions began in Sydney for the formation of a body to take control of tours from players. A draft constitution was discussed by members of the New South Wales, Victoria, South Australian and Queensland associations. In 1905, the "Australian Board of Control for International Cricket" was formed and held its first meeting at Wesley College in Melbourne on 6 May 1905. The foundation members were the New South Wales Cricket Association and the Victorian Cricket Association. South Australia's delegates refused to join the board because the board structure denied the players any representation. The Queensland Cricket Association was represented as an observer only. The Queensland cricket association decided to formally join the board with one delegate member the following year. In 1906, the board's constitution was amended so that New South Wales, South Australia and Victoria would each have three permanent representatives and Queensland one representative. In 1907, Tasmania was permitted to send a single representative. Western Australia did likewise in 1913. Changes to this structure were made in 1914 and 1974 respectively when Queensland and Western Australia increased their representation to two each.

In 1973, the board changed its name to the Australian Cricket Board (ACB)

The board was incorporated on 29 September 1982. In 2003, it changed its name to Cricket Australia.

In 2001, it established its National Indigenous Cricket Advisory Committee (NICAC) which, in 2002, established a strategic plan, "Two Cultures: Australia's New Cricket Tradition". Ngadjuri man Vince Copley was the inaugural co-chair of the committee.

== Finances ==
CA reported cumulative financial losses since 2019. Despite record attendances and record revenue from sponsorship and television rights, it reported a $11.3 million loss for 2024/25, leaving the organisation in debt. Its management has been criticised for over-spending, especially on their own salaries, benefits and travel.

== Competitions ==
As well as responsibility for Australian international sides, Cricket Australia organises interstate cricket in Australia, including the premier competitions in each of the major forms of the game. These are the Sheffield Shield in first-class cricket (men's competition only), the One-Day Cup (men) and the Women's National Cricket League, which are the domestic one-day competitions, and the KFC Big Bash League and the Weber Women's Big Bash League, which are the domestic Twenty20 competitions (contested by franchises not state representative teams).

Cricket Australia's current and former competitions:

- Sheffield Shield (first-class, various forms, 1892/93-present)
- One-Day Cup (limited-overs, various forms, 1969/70-present)
- KFC Twenty20 Big Bash (T20, 2005/06-2010/11, replaced by KFC BBL)
- KFC Big Bash League (T20, 2011/12-present)
- Toyota Second XI (red-ball, various forms, 1999/2000-2008/09, 2019/20-present, 2009/10-2018/19 as Futures League)
- Australian Women's Cricket Championships (first-class and limited-overs, various forms, 1930/31-1995/96, replaced by WNCL)
- Women's National Cricket League (limited-overs, various forms, 1996/97-present)
- Australian Women's Twenty20 Cup (T20, various forms, 2007-2014/15, replaced by WBBL)
- Weber Women's Big Bash League (T20, 2015/16-present, 2015/16-2020/21 as rebel WBBL)

Cricket Australia also runs (among others) the Under 19 and Under 17 Male Championships, the Under 18 and Under 15 Female National Championships, the National Indigenous Cricket Championships and the National Cricket Inclusion Championships.

== Honours ==
Cricket Australia also provides awards for various categories of players, including:

- Male: Test Player of the Year, One-Day Player of the Year, Bradman Young Player of the Year, Domestic Player of the Year, and the Allan Border Medal for the overall best Australian men's cricketer of the year.
- Female: the Belinda Clark Award for the best Australian women's cricketer of the year, the Betty Wilson Young Player of the Year, and the Domestic Player of the Year

Cricket Australia also honours players for exceptional service to the game of cricket in Australia by annually adding former players of great distinction to the Australian Cricket Hall of Fame.

== Principals / Chairman of Cricket Australia ==
=== Chairmen ===
- Richard Teece: 1892–1893
- Richard Best: 1893–1895
- Mostyn Evan: 1895–1896; 1910–1911
- John Gibson: 1896–1897
- Will Whitridge: 1897–1900
- Lawrence Adamson: 1905–1906
- Ernie Bean: 1906–1907; 1912–1913
- George Barbour: 1907–1908
- George Foxton: 1908–1910
- Charles Eady: 1911
- William McElhone: 1911–1912
- James Allen: 1913–1914
- Harry Blinman: 1914–1919
- Harold Bushby: 1919; 1925–1926
- Harry Gregory: 1919–1920; 1922–1923; 1926–1927
- Harry Rush: 1920–1922
- Jack Hutcheon: 1923–1924
- Bernard Scrymgour: 1924–1925
- Aubrey Oxlade: 1927–1930; 1933–1936; 1945–1948; 1951–1952
- Allen Robertson: 1930–1933; 1936–1945; 1948–1951
- Roy Middleton: 1952–1955
- Frank Cush: 1955–1957
- Bill Dowling: 1957–1960
- Sir Donald Bradman: 1960–1963; 1969–1972
- Ewart Macmillan: 1963–1966
- Bob Parish: 1966–1969; 1975–1978
- Tim Caldwell: 1972–1975
- Phil Ridings: 1980–1983
- Fred Bennett: 1983–1986
- Malcolm Gray: 1986–1989
- Colin Egar: 1989–1992
- Alan Crompton: 1992–1995
- Denis Rogers: 1995–2001
- Robert Merriman: 2001–2005
- Creagh O'Connor: 2005–2008
- Jack Clarke: 2008–2011
- Wally Edwards: 2011–2015
- David Peever: 2015–2018
- Earl Eddings: 2018–2021
- Richard Freudenstein: 2021–2022 (interim)
- Lachlan Henderson: 2022–2023
- Mike Baird: 2023–present

=== Secretaries & Chief Executive Officers ===
- John Portus: 1892–1896
- John Creswell: 1896–1900
- William McElhone: 1905–1910
- Colin Sinclair: 1910–1911
- Sydney Smith: 1911–1927
- William Jeanes: 1927–1954
- Jack Ledward: 1954–1960
- Alan Barnes: 1960–1980
- David Richards: 1980–1993
- Graham Halbish: 1993–1997
- Malcolm Speed: 1997–2001
- James Sutherland: 2001–2018
- Kevin Roberts: 2018–2020
- Nick Hockley: 2020–2025
- Todd Greenberg: 2025–present

=== National Selection Panel ===
The National Selection Panel is the part of Cricket Australia responsible for team selections for each of the Australian national sides in every form of cricket.

The current three-man panel for the Australian men's sides is: George Bailey (chairman), Andrew McDonald (head coach) and Tony Dodemaide.

The current four-person panel for the Australia women's sides is: Shawn Flegler (chairman), Matthew Mott (head coach), Avril Fahey and Julie Hayes.

=== Board of directors ===
Cricket Australia is governed by nine directors, who work collectively in the national interest of Australian cricket.

The chief executive officer reports to the board of directors. The current nine board members are:

Name	Affiliation	Role(s)	Term started
Lachlan Henderson	Western Australia	Director	3 September 2018
John Harnden AM	South Australia	Director	15 April 2016
Paul Green	Tasmania	Director	25 October 2018
Richard Freudenstein	Independent	Non-Executive Director	10 June 2019
Mike Baird AO	New South Wales	Chair	28 February 2021
Vanessa Guthrie AO	Independent	Non-Executive Director	28 February 2021
Greg Rowell	Queensland	Director	10 June 2021
Clea Smith	Victoria	Director	13 October 2022
David Maddocks	Independent	Non-Executive Director	13 October 2022

Last updated: 13 October 2022

== See also ==
- Australian national cricket team
- Australia national women's cricket team
- Cricket in Australia

== Bibliography ==
- Wisden Cricketers Almanack
- Pollard, Jack (1988). Australian Cricket: The game and the players. Sydney: Angus & Robertson. ISBN 0-207-15269-1.
