= 2023–24 NTFL season =

103rd season of the Northern Territory Football League

- Date: 6 October 2023 − 16 March 2024
- Teams: 21

The 2023–24 NTFL season was the 103rd season of the Northern Territory Football League (NTFL), the highest-level Australian rules football competition in the Northern Territory. The season began on 6 October 2023 and concluded on 16 March 2024, with three divisions for both the men's and women's competitions.

== Notable events ==
- Following a 55-point loss to the Tiwi Bombers in round 12, the Palmerston Magpies terminated the contract of Men's Premier League coach Josh Heath. Heath had signed a two-year contract extension in February 2023, and was replaced in March 2024 by Mark Tyrrell.
- During the Men's Premier League elimination final between PINT and Southern Districts, PINT player Warrick Williams threw an umpire to the ground during a melee involving several players. Williams was suspended for 20 weeks and deregistered as a player after pleading guilty at an independent tribunal.
- On 2 March 2024, several players from Tracy Village broke out into a brawl in the Darwin CBD following "alleged tensions". The club launched an investigation, which resulted in three players being deregistered from the club and one player facing an "extended suspension".
- One week before the NTFL's awards night, the name of Dennis Dunn was removed from the award for leading goalkicker in the Premier League (which had been known since 2009 as the "Dennis Dunn Medal"). The NTFL cited Dunn "attempting to smuggle a pound of cannabis to the Tiwi Islands", which he had been charged and convicted for in 2016.

== Men's Premier League ==
2023–24 NTFL MPL season
- Date: 6 October 2023 − 16 March 2024
- Teams: 9
- Premiers: St Mary's; 34th Premier League premiership
- Minor premiers: St Mary's
- Nichols Medallist: Dylan Landt (St Mary's − 23 votes)
- Leading goalkicker: Jayden Magro (Waratah − 63 goals)

St Mary's won the Men's Premier League (MPL) premiership for the 34th time, defeating the Nightcliff Tigers by 13 points in the grand final.

=== Ladder ===
Pos	Team	Pld	W	L	D	PF	PA	PP	Pts	Qualification
1	St Mary's (P)	16	13	3	0	1763	804	219.3	52	Finals series
2	Nightcliff Tigers	16	12	4	0	1460	814	179.4	48	Finals series
3	Waratah	16	11	5	0	1533	908	168.8	44	Finals series
4	Southern Districts	16	11	5	0	1633	975	167.5	44	Finals series
5	PINT	16	10	6	0	1132	908	124.67	40	Finals series
6	Darwin	16	8	8	0	1274	1487	85.7	32	
7	Tiwi Bombers	16	4	12	0	1058	1495	70.8	16	
8	Wanderers	16	3	13	0	814	1758	46.3	12	
9	Palmerston Magpies	16	0	16	0	568	2086	27.2	0	

Rules for classification: 1) points; 2) percentage; 3) number of points for.
(P) Premiers

=== Finals ===
	Elimination final
Saturday, 24 February 2024 (4:15pm)	Southern Districts 12.10 (82)	def.	PINT 8.8 (56)	TIO Stadium

	Qualifying final
Saturday, 24 February 2024 (6:45pm)	Nightcliff Tigers 9.10 (64)	def.	Waratah 9.8 (62)	TIO Stadium

	First semi-final
Saturday, 2 March 2024 (4:15pm)	Waratah 8.12 (60)	def. by	Southern Districts 17.10 (112)	TIO Stadium

	Second semi-final
Saturday, 2 March 2024 (6:45pm)	St Mary's 11.10 (76)	def. by	Nightcliff Tigers 13.9 (87)	TIO Stadium

	Preliminary final
Saturday, 9 March 2024 (6:45pm)	St Mary's 12.11 (83)	def.	Southern Districts 8.9 (57)	TIO Stadium

2023–24 NTFL Men's Premier League Grand Final
Saturday, 16 March 2024 (6:45pm)	Nightcliff Tigers	def. by	St Mary's	TIO Stadium
1.4 (10); 1.7 (13); 2.9 (21); 3.13 (31)	Q1; Q2; Q3; Final	0.3 (3); 2.8 (20); 4.11 (35); 5.14 (44)	Chaney Medal: Joel Garner (St Mary's); Television broadcast: KommunityTV
Butcher, Dahms, Tardrew	Goals	Calder 3, J. Landt, Vallejo
Filo, Nyhuis, Buxton, Dahms, Brown	Best	Calder, J. Landt, D. Landt, Garner, Paredes,

=== Club best and fairest ===
Club	Winner	Ref
Darwin		
Nightcliff Tigers		
Palmerston Magpies		
PINT		
Southern Districts	Jed Anderson	
St Mary's		
Tiwi Bombers		
Wanderers	Jaxon East	
Waratah	Scott Carlin	

== Men's Division 1 ==
2023–24 NTFLM Division 1 season
- Date: 6 October 2023 − 16 March 2024
- Teams: 6
- Premiers: Tracy Village; 3rd Division 1 premiership
- Minor premiers: Jabiru Bombers
- Best and fairest: Rodney Nagawalli (Jabiru Bombers − 12 votes)
- Leading goalkicker: Mathias Liddy (St Mary's − 45 goals)

Tracy Village won the Men's Division 1 premiership for the third time and the second year in a row, defeating the Jabiru Bombers by 14 points in the grand final.

=== Ladder ===
Pos	Team	Pld	W	L	D	PF	PA	PP	Pts	Qualification
1	Jabiru Bombers	15	14	1	0	1165	549	212.2	56	Finals series
2	Tracy Village (P)	15	12	3	0	1185	576	205.73	48	Finals series
3	St Mary's	15	7	8	0	830	742	111.9	28	Finals series
4	PINT	15	7	8	0	695	685	101.5	28	Finals series
5	Banks	15	4	11	0	560	979	57.2	16	
6	Waratah	16	1	14	0	363	1267	28.7	4	

Rules for classification: 1) points; 2) percentage; 3) number of points for.
(P) Premiers

=== Finals ===
	Second semi-final
Saturday, 2 March 2024 (1:45pm)	Jabiru Bombers 10.8 (68)	def.	Tracy Village 10.6 (66)	TIO Stadium Oval 2

	First semi-final
Saturday, 2 March 2024 (3:30pm)	St Mary's 7.14 (56)	def.	PINT 6.6 (42)	TIO Stadium Oval 2

	Preliminary final
Saturday, 9 March 2024 (1:00pm)	Tracy Village 11.9 (75)	def.	St Mary's 10.8 (68)	TIO Stadium Oval 2

2023–24 NTFL Men's Division 1 Grand Final
Saturday, 16 March (1:00pm)	Jabiru Bombers	def. by	Tracy Village	TIO Stadium
2.3 (15); 3.4 (22); 4.6 (30); 4.6 (30)	Q1; Q2; Q3; Final	2.0 (12); 5.1 (31); 6.1 (37); 7.2 (44)	Best on ground: Ryan Folkes (Tracy Village)
Goals	Naylor 3, Gill, Jordan, Perrin, Whinfield
Best	Folkes, Jordan, Perrin, Mullins, Maddern, Naylor

=== Club best and fairest ===
Club	Winner	Ref
Banks	Dion Parker	
Jabiru Bombers	Riley Patterson	
PINT		
St Mary's		
Tracy Village		
Waratah	Adam Govers	

== Men's Division 2 ==
2023–24 NTFLM Division 2 season
- Date: 6 October 2023 − 16 March 2024
- Teams: 6
- Premiers: Southern Districts; 1st Division 2 premiership
- Minor premiers: Nightcliff Spartans
- Best and fairest: Jaise Coleman (Nightcliff Spartans − 19 votes)
- Leading goalkicker: Brent Crisp (Nightcliff Spartans − 34 goals)

Southern Districts won the Men's Division 2 premiership for the first time, defeating the Nightcliff Spartans by 1 point in the grand final.

=== Ladder ===
Tracy Village forfeited its round 15 match against Nightcliff Spartans, with the Spartans awarded a 10-goal victory. Additionally, Darwin forfeited its round 18 game against the Palmerston Rats, with the Rats also awarded a 10-goal victory.

In round 18, Southern Districts defeated Tracy Village 30.17 (197) to 0.0 (0). However, the scoreline was later removed with both teams disqualified.

Pos	Team	Pld	W	WF	L	D	PF	PA	PP	Pts	Qualification
1	Nightcliff Spartans	14	12	1	1	0	1395	290	481.0	52	Finals series
2	Palmerston Rats	14	10	0	4	0	1106	531	208.3	40	Finals series
3	Southern Districts (P)	14	9	0	4	0	881	418	210.8	36	Finals series
4	PINT	15	6	0	9	0	418	881	57.8	24	Finals series
5	Darwin	12	3	0	9	0	367	996	36.9	12	
6	Tracy Village	15	0	0	14	0	227	1298	17.5	0	

Rules for classification: 1) points; 2) percentage; 3) number of points for.
(P) Premiers

=== Finals ===
	Second semi-final
Saturday, 2 March 2024 (9:00am)	Nightcliff Spartans 7.6 (48)	def.	Palmerston Rats 7.4 (46)	TIO Stadium Oval 2

	First semi-final
Saturday, 2 March 2024 (10:00am)	Southern Districts 8.12 (60)	def.	PINT 1.4 (14)	TIO Stadium

	Preliminary final
Saturday, 9 March 2024 (3:00pm)	Palmerston Rats 10.7 (67)	def. by	Southern Districts 13.5 (83)	TIO Stadium Oval 2

2023–24 NTFL Men's Division 2 Grand Final
Saturday, 16 March 2024 (9:00am)	Nightcliff Spartans	def. by	Southern Districts	TIO Stadium
2.1 (13); 3.1 (19); 4.1 (25); 5.4 (34); 5.5 (35)	Q1; Q2; Q3; Q4; Final	3.1 (19); 4.3 (27); 5.4 (34); 5.4 (34); 5.6 (36)	Best on ground: Jaise Coleman (Nightcliff Spartans)
At the end of the fourth quarter, both teams were tied on 5.4 (34) each. The first half of extra time saw Southern Districts leading 5.5 (35) to Nightcliff 5.4 (34). The second half saw both teams again tied on 5.5 (35) each. Because of the extra time tie, the golden point system was used, which saw Southern Districts win by one point.
