= 2025–26 NTFL season =

105th season of the Northern Territory Football League

- Date: 2 October 2025 – 14 March 2026

The 2025–26 NTFL season was the 105th season of the Northern Territory Football League (NTFL), the highest-level Australian rules football competition in the Northern Territory. The season began on 2 October 2025 and concluded on 14 March 2026.

All matches in round 8 were cancelled because of Tropical Cyclone Fina, with every team awarded two premiership points.

== Men's Premier League ==
2025–26 NTFL MPL season
- Date: 2 October 2025 – 14 March 2026
- Teams: 9
- Premiers: Nightcliff; 7th MPL premiership
- Runners-up: St Mary's; 21st MPL runners-up result
- Minor premiers: Southern Districts; 8th MPL minor premiership
- Nichols Medallist: Dylan Landt (St Mary's – 22 votes)
- Leading goalkicker: Beau Schwarze (Southern Districts – 40 goals)

Other premiers
- Reserves: Banks Bulldogs

Nightcliff won the Men's Premier League premiership for the seventh time, defeating St Mary's by 72 points in the grand final.

=== Ladder ===
Pos	Team	Pld	W	L	D	PF	PA	PP	Pts	Qualification
1	Southern Districts	15	13	2	0	1332	701	190.0	54	Finals series
2	St Mary's	15	12	3	0	1389	667	208.2	50	Finals series
3	Nightcliff (P)	15	11	3	1	1220	785	155.4	48	Finals series
4	PINT	15	10	4	1	1172	819	143.1	44	Finals series
5	Waratah	15	8	7	0	1065	879	121.2	34	Finals series
6	Tiwi Bombers	16	7	9	0	1229	1307	94.0	30	
7	Darwin	15	3	12	0	682	1463	46.6	14	
8	Wanderers	15	2	13	0	558	1407	39.7	10	
9	Palmerston	15	1	14	0	645	1264	51.0	6	

Rules for classification: 1) points; 2) percentage; 3) number of points for.

=== Finals ===
Qualifying and elimination finals
2	St Mary's	5.11 (41)
3	Nightcliff	9.10 (64)
4	PINT	8.11 (59)
5	Waratah	8.9 (57)

Semi-finals
1	Southern Districts	2.6 (18)
Nightcliff	9.13 (67)
St Mary's	11.8 (74)
PINT	10.10 (70)

Preliminary final
Southern Districts	5.3 (33)
St Mary's	12.14 (86)

Grand Final
Nightcliff	13.14 (92)
St Mary's	2.8 (20)

==== Grand Final ====
2025–26 NTFL Men's Premier League Grand Final
Saturday, 14 March 2026 (6:45pm)	Nightcliff	def.	St Mary's	TIO Stadium
2.4 (16); 8.7 (55); 9.10 (64); 13.14 (92)	Q1; Q2; Q3; Final	0.3 (3); 2.4 (16); 2.6 (18); 2.8 (20)	Chaney Medal: Brandan Parfitt (Nightcliff); Television broadcast: KommunityTV/7plus
Z. Derksen 4, B. Bailey 2, L. Tardrew 2, B. Kennedy, S. Linke, M. McGregor, P. Politis, L. Rinaldi	Goals	L. Davies, C. West

== Women's Premier League ==
2025–26 NTFL WPL season
- Date: 3 October 2025 – 14 March 2026
- Teams: 9
- Premiers: PINT
- Runners-up: Nightcliff
- Minor premiers: Nightcliff
- Best and fairest: Jasmyn Hewett (PINT – 25 votes)
- Leading goalkicker: Cassie McWilliam (Nightcliff – 30 goals)

PINT won the Women's Premier League premiership, defeating Nightcliff by two points in the grand final.

=== Ladder ===
Southern Districts' round 7 victory over Waratah was stripped and treated as a forfeit after the club was ruled to have breached player eligibility requirements, while Tiwi Bombers forfeited its round 13 match against St Mary's because of a "range of logistical challenges".

Pos	Team	Pld	W	WF	L	LF	D	PF	PA	PP	Pts	Qualification
1	Nightcliff	15	15	0	0	0	0	954	295	323.4	62	Finals series
2	St Mary's	14	11	1	3	0	0	853	270	315.9	50	Finals series
3	PINT (P)	15	10	0	5	0	0	736	318	231.5	42	Finals series
4	Southern Districts	14	8	0	6	1	0	696	504	138.1	34	Finals series
5	Darwin	15	7	0	8	0	0	490	665	73.7	30	Finals series
6	Palmerston	15	6	0	9	0	0	551	608	90.6	26	
7	Waratah	14	3	1	11	0	0	421	715	58.9	18	
8	Wanderers	15	4	0	11	0	0	379	1220	31.1	18	
9	Tiwi Bombers	14	2	0	12	1	0	452	937	48.2	8	

Rules for classification: 1) points; 2) percentage; 3) number of points for.

=== Finals ===
Qualifying and elimination finals
2	St Mary's	5.9 (39)
3	PINT	4.5 (29)
4	Southern Districts	4.1 (25)
5	Darwin	5.4 (34)

Semi-finals
1	Nightcliff	7.13 (55)
St Mary's	2.2 (14)
PINT	8.7 (55)
Darwin	6.3 (39)

Preliminary final
St Mary's	1.3 (9)
PINT	2.6 (18)

Grand Final
Nightcliff	2.1 (13)
PINT	2.3 (15)

==== Grand Final ====
2025–26 NTFL Women's Premier League Grand Final
Saturday, 14 March 2026 (4:15pm)	Nightcliff	def. by	PINT	TIO Stadium
1.0 (6); 2.1 (13); 2.1 (13); 2.1 (13)	Q1; Q2; Q3; Final	0.0 (0); 1.1 (7); 2.3 (15); 2.3 (15)	Best on ground: Jasmyn Hewett (PINT); Television broadcast: KommunityTV/7plus
E. Hand 2	Goals	J. Hewett, R. Huppatz
