= 2022–23 NTFL season =

102nd season of the NTFL

- Teams: 9
- Premiers: Waratah; 16th premiership
- Minor premiers: Southern Districts; 6th minor premiership
- Wooden spooners: Tiwi Bombers; 4th wooden spoon

The 2022–23 NTFL season was the 102nd season of the Northern Territory Football League (NTFL).

This season had the PINT Greenants join the Men's Premier League as the ninth club.

The first game was played on Friday, 30 September, and the Grand Final was played on Saturday, 18 March, with Waratah winning their 16th premiership, breaking a 23-year premiership drought. Waratah defeated Southern Districts by 18 points in the Grand Final.

== Ladder ==
2022–23 NTFL Ladder
Pos	Team	Pld	W	L	D	PF	PA	PP	Pts
1	Southern Districts	15	12	3	0	1241	879	141.2	48
2	Waratah (P)	16	12	4	0	1275	911	140.0	48
3	St Marys	16	11	5	0	1430	1025	139.5	44
4	Nightcliff	16	10	6	0	1106	826	133.9	40
5	Darwin	15	7	8	0	1123	1179	95.3	28
6	Palmerston	16	6	9	1	902	1136	79.4	26
7	PINT	16	5	9	2	959	948	101.2	24
8	Wanderers	16	5	11	0	877	1200	73.1	20
9	Tiwi Bombers	16	1	14	1	825	1634	50.5	6

(P) Premiers

== Finals ==
Qualifying and elimination finals
2	Waratah	86
3	St Marys	49
4	Nightcliff	43
5	Darwin	41

Semi-finals
1	Southern Districts	49
2	Waratah	105
3	St Marys	86
4	Nightcliff	51

Preliminary final
1	Southern Districts	93
3	St Marys	70

Grand final
2	Waratah	70
1	Southern Districts	52

== Grand Final ==
2022–23 NTFL Grand Final
Saturday 18 March 2023 (6:45 pm)	Waratah	def.	Southern Districts	Marrara Stadium	Report
4.3 (27); 5.4 (34); 5.8 (38); 10.10 (70)	Q1; Q2; Q3; Final	1.1 (7); 4.4 (28); 5.7 (37); 7.10 (52)
