= Bernard Scrymgour =

Australian cricketer and cricket administrator

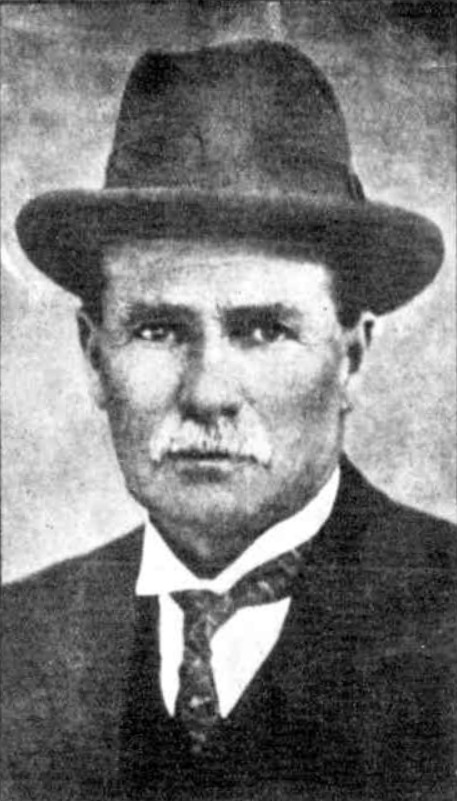

Personal information
- Full name: Bernard Vincent Scrymgour
- Born: 31 July 1864; Adelaide, South Australia
- Died: 16 April 1943 (aged 78); Medindie, Adelaide, South Australia

Domestic team information
- Years: Team
- 1890/91–1896/97: South Australia

Career statistics
Competition	First-class
Matches	5
Runs scored	65
Batting average	8.12
100s/50s	0/0
Top score	37
Balls bowled	0
Wickets	–
Bowling average	–
5 wickets in innings	–
10 wickets in match	–
Best bowling	–
Catches/stumpings	4/0
- Source: Cricinfo, 1 August 2019

Bernard Vincent Scrymgour (31 July 1864 – 16 April 1943) was a cricketer and administrator who played first-class cricket for South Australia from 1891 to 1897.

Bernard Scrymgour was educated at Prince Alfred College, Adelaide. After a modest playing career at state level he became a prominent cricket administrator. He was a member of the committee of the South Australian Cricket Association for almost 50 years, and president from 1928 to 1940. He also served as a state selector, and was for a time chairman of the Australian Cricket Board. He was one of the founders of the Sturt Cricket Club, one of Adelaide’s leading teams.

He was a senior partner in the Adelaide printing and stationery firm Scrymgour and Sons, and was a prominent supporter of local charitable organisations. He and his wife, who predeceased him by a year, had three sons and three daughters.

In his memory the Scrymgour Club Championship Shield is presented to the club in the Adelaide competition with the highest aggregate points for first, second, third and fourth grades at the end of the minor rounds.
