= Marrara Cricket Ground =

Sports ground in Darwin, Northern Territory, Australia

- DXC Arena
- Interactive map of Marrara Cricket Ground
- Location: Marrara, Northern Territory
- Country: Australia
- Coordinates: 12.401°S 130.888°E
- Home club: PINT Cricket Club; PINT Football Club
- Owner: Government of the Northern Territory
- Operator: Northern Territory Cricket

Marrara Cricket Ground, currently known as the DXC Arena for sponsorship reasons, is a sports ground located in Darwin in the Northern Territory of Australia. The venue is used for cricket and Australian rules football. It forms part of the Marrara Sporting Complex and should not be confused with the nearby Marrara Oval (TIO Stadium), which has also hosted high-level cricket but is used primarily for large-scale Australian rules football and rugby league events.

== History ==
The venue was developed in the early 1990s as part of the Northern Territory Government’s investment in major sporting facilities at Marrara. Built to host top-level cricket, the ground has staged international, domestic, and representative matches, alongside its role as a community sports hub.

The naming rights were acquired by DXC Technology in July 2020, after which the ground became known commercially as DXC Arena.

== Facilities ==
The venue features a turf playing surface, practice nets, a pavilion with player and official amenities, and spectator areas comprising a small grandstand and grassed embankments. Floodlighting was upgraded in 2021 with modern LED lights, allowing for both day and night fixtures.

The ground also serves as the administrative headquarters for Northern Territory Cricket.

== Cricket ==
The ground hosted first-class cricket in 2024, with Pakistan Shaheens and Bangladesh HP XI playing two four-day matches and one of three List A matches at the ground. Three List A matches and the second of two first-class matches in Sri Lanka A's tour of Australia in 2025 was played at the Marrara Cricket Ground, with the first first-class match being played at the neighbouring Marrara Oval. The ground hosted the nineteen matches of the Top End T20 Series including playoffs and final.

At a grassroots level, Marrara Cricket Ground is the home venue for the PINT Cricket Club, one of the long-standing clubs in the Darwin & District Cricket Competition. The venue regularly stages local league matches, finals, and junior development carnivals.

== Australian rules football ==
Marrara serves as the home ground of the PINT Football Club in the Northern Territory Football League.
