= PINT Football Club =

Australian rules football club in Darwin

Names
- Full name: PINT Football Club
- Nickname(s): Greenants, Queenants
- Former nickname: Panthers (1981−1997)

2025–26 season
- After finals: 4th
- Home-and-away season: 4th

Club details
- Founded: 1981; 45 years ago
- Competition: Northern Territory Football League
- Premierships: NTFL Division 1 (2): 2019−20; 2020–21; NTFL Division 2 (2): 2020–21; 2021–22; NTFLW Premier (4): 2020–21; 2022–23; 2023–24; 2025-26; NTFA/TEAFA (5): 1986–87; 1987–88; 1990–91; 2008–09; 2009–10

Uniforms
Home

Other information
- Official website: pintfc.tidyhq.com

The PINT Football Club (sometimes referred to as PINTS), nicknamed the Greenants, is an Australian rules football club based in the Darwin suburb of Marrara. The club was formed by people associated with the Postal Institute of the Northern Territory (PINT).

As of 2024, the club competes in the Northern Territory Football League (NTFL), with men's and women's teams participating in Premier League, Division 1 and Division 2.

== History ==
PINT was formed ahead of the 1981–82 NTFL season, entering the NTFL's C Grade (also known as the Carlton United Sunday Competition), which was a lower-level competition for players who were not able to play a game in the NTFL's top division. In 1982, C Grade became its own competition with the formation of the Northern Territory Football Association (NTFA) − which was renamed in 2000 to the Top End Australian Football Association (TEAFA) − and PINT became an inaugural NTFA club.

In its early years, the club was known as the PINT Panthers, and some media reports simply dubbed the club "the Panthers". The club officially changed its nickname to the "Greenants" in 1997.

The TEAFA merged with the NTFL in early 2010, and PINT entered the newly formed NTFL Division 1 for the 2010–11 season. PINT formed a women's team (nicknamed the Queenants) for the 2015–16 Division 1 season, before entering the newly formed Women's Premier League (WPL) for the 2016–17 NTFL season. The club won its first Premier League premiership in 2021.

In December 2021, PINT's committee officially stated its aim to enter the Men's Premier League (MPL) for the 2022–23 NTFL season. This goal was achieved on 27 April 2022, when AFL Northern Territory announced that PINT would be admitted into the MPL. Shannon Motlop was appointed as senior coach, but despite the club reaching the finals series in its second MPL season, Motlop was dismissed as coach after two years.

== Club achievements ==
=== NTFL Men's Premier League (2022–23 – Present) ===
- Premiers: Nil
- Runners Up: Nil
- Minor Premiers: Nil
- Wooden Spooners: Nil

=== NTFL Women's Premier League (2015/16 – Present) ===
- Premiers (4): 2020/21, 2022/23, 2023/24, 2025/26
- Runners Up (0): Nil
- Minor Premiers (4): 2020/21, 2022/23, 2023/24, 2024/25
- Wooden Spooners (0): Nil
