= Territory Netball Stadium =

Netball stadium in Darwin, Australia

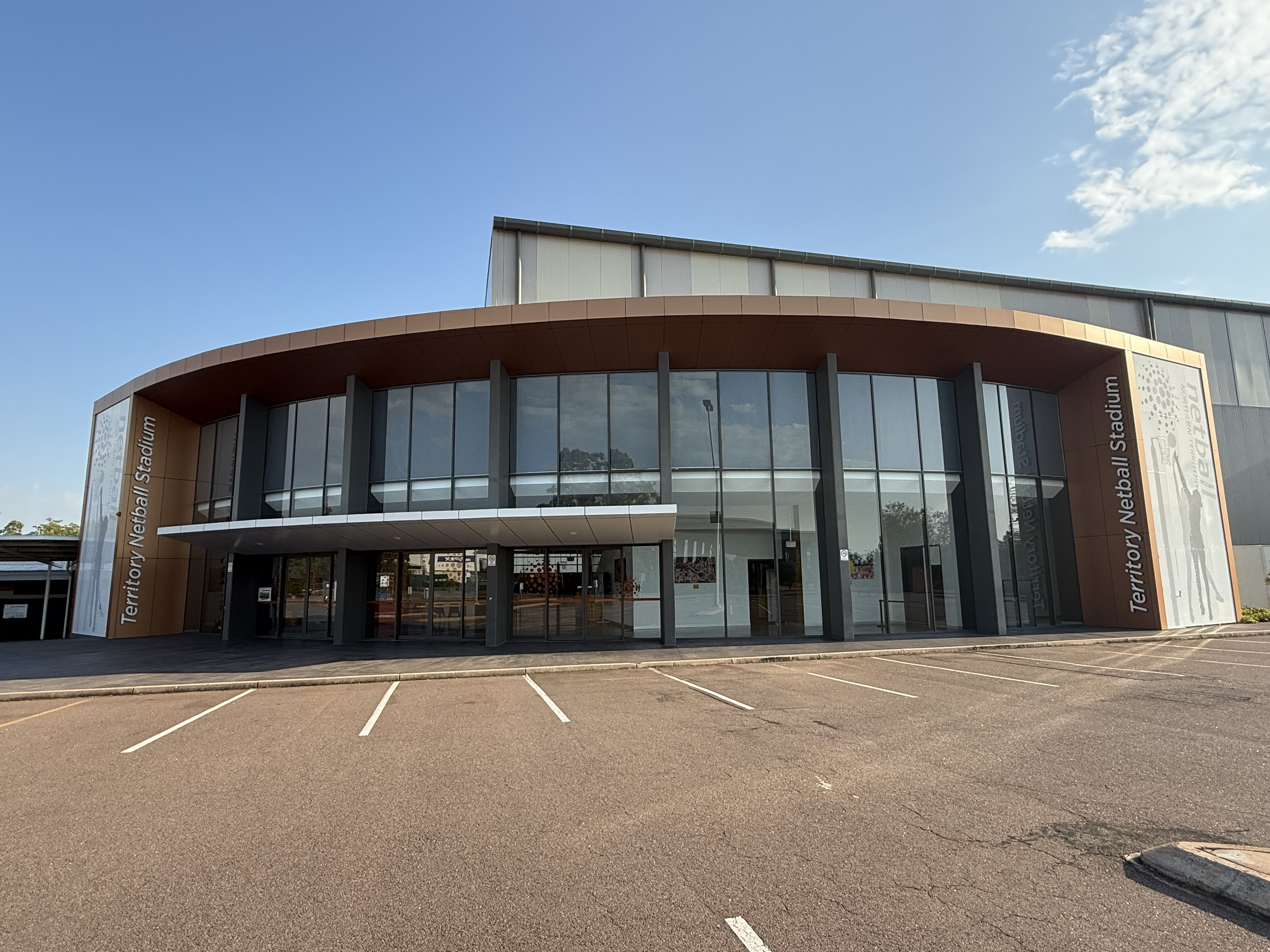
- Territory Netball Stadium, September 2025
- Former names: Darwin Indoor Netball Stadium
- Location: 235 Abala Road; Marrara, Northern Territory
- Owner: Government of the Northern Territory
- Operator: Netball Northern Territory
- Capacity: 2,000

Construction
- Groundbreaking: 2018
- Opened: 2019
- Cost: $19.8

Tenants
- Territory Storm (Australian Netball Championships) (2019-present); Adelaide Thunderbirds (SSN) (2019)

Territory Netball Stadium is an Australia netball stadium located in Marrara, a suburb of Darwin, Northern Territory. The stadium is owned by the Government of the Northern Territory who in turn lease it to Netball Northern Territory. Since opening in January 2019, it has become the home venue of Territory Storm of the Australian Netball League.

== Construction ==
Darwin-based building firm Sunbuild began construction in 2018. The Government of the Northern Territory and Government of Australia contributed $11.8 million and $8 million respectively towards the project. While under construction, the stadium was also referred to as the Darwin Indoor Netball Stadium. On 24 January 2019, once construction was completed, the stadium was handed over to Netball Northern Territory who leased it from the Government of the Northern Territory.

== Facilities ==
The venue features four netball courts including a main court with seating for 2,000. It also contains changing rooms, an umpires room, meeting rooms, a café and an underground car park.

== Territory Storm ==
In 2019 Territory Storm of the Australian Netball League began to play some of their home games at the new stadium.

== Events hosted ==
Event	
2019 Arafura Games	Indoor volleyball
Netball at the 2019 Arafura Games	
2019 Suncorp Super Netball Round 7	Adelaide Thunderbirds vs Sunshine Coast Lightning
