= Jack Hutcheon =

Australian cricketer (1882–1957)

Personal information
- Full name: John Silvester Hutcheon
- Born: 5 April 1882; Warwick, Queensland, Australia
- Died: 18 June 1957 (aged 75); Albion Heights, Queensland, Australia
- Batting: Right-handed
- Bowling: Right-arm medium
- Relatives: Ernest Hutcheon (brother)

Domestic team information
- Years: Team
- 1905-06 to 1910-11: Queensland

Career statistics
Competition	First-class
Matches	12
Runs scored	599
Batting average	24.95
100s/50s	0/4
Top score	73
Balls bowled	54
Wickets	0
Bowling average	–
5 wickets in innings	–
10 wickets in match	–
Best bowling	–
Catches/stumpings	15/0
- Source: CricketArchive, 8 July 2019

John Silvester Hutcheon CBE QC (5 April 1882 – 18 June 1957) was an Australian cricketer who played first-class cricket for Queensland from 1905 to 1910. He was later a prominent cricket administrator and barrister.

== Life and career ==
Jack Hutcheon was born in Toowoomba, where he attended Toowoomba Grammar School. He moved to Brisbane in 1901, and played as a batsman for the state team for five years in the years before Queensland competed in the Sheffield Shield. His highest first-class score came in his last season, 1910–11, when he captained Queensland to a 66-run victory over Victoria, scoring 20 and 73, Queensland's highest score in the match. Playing for Queensland against a Northern Rivers team in 1908-09 he scored 259 not out in 169 minutes in a team total of 828. He was invited to tour New Zealand with the Australian team in 1909-10 but declined as he was unable to take the necessary time off.

In 1911 he went to England to further his legal studies. He was called to the Bar at Lincoln's Inn in 1914, and practised as a barrister when he returned to Australia shortly afterwards. He was appointed King's Counsel in 1944 and was president of the Queensland Bar Association from 1952 to 1957.

Hutcheon was elected to the Queensland Cricket Association executive committee in 1919 and became its chairman in 1920 and president in 1926, a position he held until his death in 1957. An unflagging enthusiast for the interests of Queensland cricket, he was one of the major factors behind Queensland's admission to the Sheffield Shield in 1926-27 and Brisbane's accession to Test-ground status in 1928-29. He was appointed CBE in 1956 for services to cricket.

Hutcheon represented Australia at lacrosse in 1907. He was president of the Queensland Lacrosse Association from 1925 to 1949 and of the Australian Lacrosse Council from 1939 to 1946. He also represented Queensland at table tennis.

== Personal life ==
Hutcheon married Mabel Mary Wilkinson in Kangaroo Point, Brisbane, in 1907. They had two sons, one of whom predeceased him.
