= Netball Northern Territory =

Netball governing body

- Jurisdiction: Northern Territory
- Membership: 3,089
- Abbreviation: NNT
- Founded: 1970s
- Affiliation: Netball Australia
- Headquarters: Territory Netball Stadium
- Location: 235 Abala Road; Marrara, Northern Territory
- President: Catherine Sansom

Official website
- nt.netball.com.au

Netball Northern Territory is the governing body for netball in the Northern Territory. It is affiliated to Netball Australia. It is responsible for organizing and managing Territory Storm who have competed in the Australian Netball League. It is also responsible for organizing and managing Netball at the Arafura Games, and the NT Link Netball Championships, as well as numerous other leagues and competitions for junior and youth teams.

== History ==
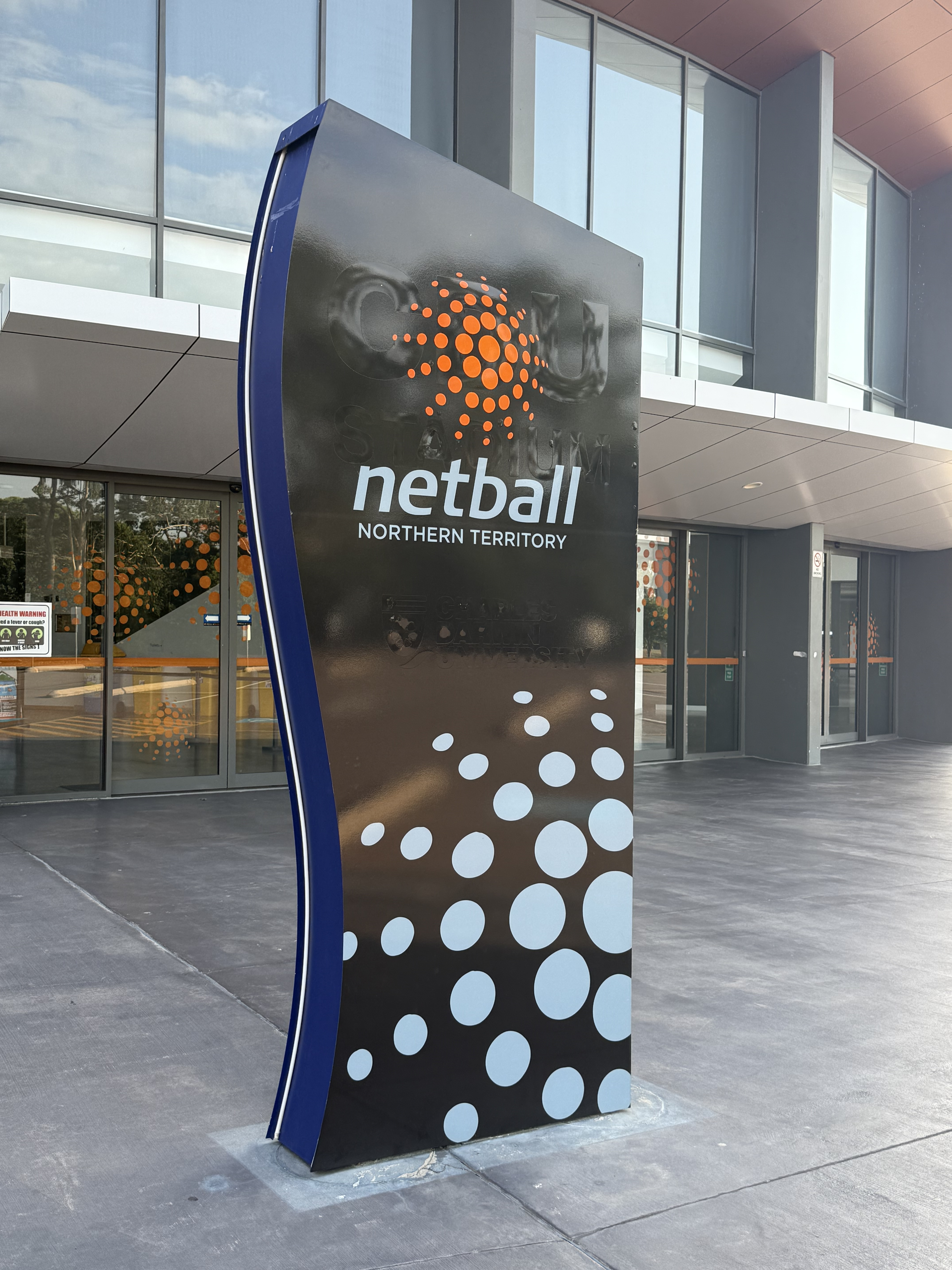
Netball Northern Territory sign out the front of Territory Netball Stadium, September 2025

Netball Northern Territory has been affiliated to Netball Australia since 1977.

Since 2019, Netball Northern Territory's headquarters have been based at Territory Netball Stadium.

== Representative teams ==
Team	Leagues	Years
Territory Storm	Australian Netball League	2008–2019
Under-19, Under-17	Australian National Netball Championships	

== Competitions ==
- Netball at the Arafura Games
- NT Link Netball Championships

== Member Associations ==
Association	Region/city/town
Alice Springs Netball Association	Alice Springs
Darwin Netball Association	Darwin
Gove Netball Association	Gove Peninsula
Katherine Netball Association	Katherine
Palmerston Netball	Palmerston

== See also ==
- Sport in the Northern Territory
