= 1981–82 NTFL season =

61st season of the NTFL

- Teams: 6
- Premiers: Wanderers; 8th premiership
- Minor premiers: St Marys; 11th minor premiership
- Wooden spooners: Palmerston; 3rd wooden spoon

The 1981–82 NTFL season was the 61st season of the Northern Territory Football League (NTFL).

The Wanderers Eagles have won their eighth premiership title while defeating St Marys in the grand final by one point.

== Grand Final ==
Premiers	GF Score	Runner-up
Wanderers	13.13 (91) - 13.12 (90)	St Marys
