= Annika Lee-Jones =

Australian netball player

Personal information
- Born: 31 October 1996 (age 29) Perth, Western Australia
- Height: 1.95 m (6 ft 5 in)

Netball career
- Playing positions: GK, GD
Years	Club team	Apps
2017–18	West Coast Fever	4
2019–2020	Sunshine Coast Lightning	
2021-	Celtic Dragons	

Annika Lee-Jones (born 31 October 1996) is an Australian netball player in the Suncorp Super Netball league, playing for the Sunshine Coast Lightning.

Lee-Jones debuted in the inaugural season (2017) of Super Netball at the West Coast Fever, the home team of her city of birth, Perth. As an underage netballer she represented Western Australia at the under 20 National Netball Championships and was also named in the Australian team for the 2017 Netball World Youth Cup. In her two years at the Fever, Lee-Jones made only four appearances for the club, before moving to the Lightning ahead of the 2019 season. Jones is a defensive player and was brought to the Lightning in the hope of being a suitable replacement for former award-winning goal defender Geva Mentor. She signed a contract extension with the Lightning, keeping her at the club until the end of the 2020 season.
