= Queensland Cricket =

Sports governing body in Queensland, Australia

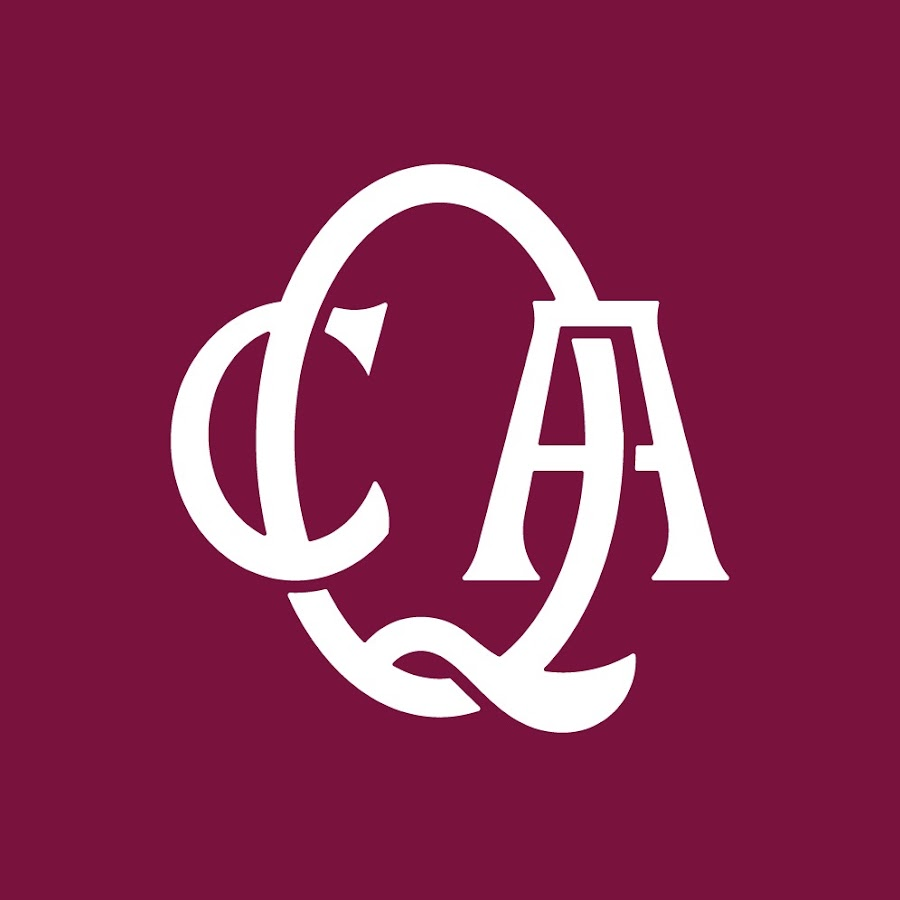
- Sport: Cricket
- Founded: 1876; 149 years ago
- Affiliation: Cricket Australia
- Headquarters: The Gabba
- Chairman: Kirsten Pike

Official website
- www.qldcricket.com.au
- (Queensland)
- (Australia)

Queensland Cricket, formerly known as the Queensland Cricket Association, is the governing body of Cricket in Queensland, Australia. Formed in 1876, it is directly responsible for the Queensland Bulls, Queensland Fire, Allan Border Field and Queensland Premier Cricket. Terry Svenson is the current CEO of the body, and Kirsten Pike is Chair of the Board of Directors.

== Grade Competitions ==
Queensland Premier Cricket was founded for the 1897/98 season as the premier competition for Brisbane cricket clubs but it has since expanded to represent wider South East Queensland with Ipswich, Gold Coast, and Sunshine Coast teams competing.

Other grade competitions affiliated with Queensland Cricket include Townsville Cricket, and Cricket Far North.

== History ==
=== Early Queensland cricket administration: 1863–1876 ===
An early effort to administ rate cricket in Queensland came in December 1863 when an Intercolonial Cricket Match between Queensland and New South Wales was proposed and a 'Central Intercolonial Cricket Match Committee' was formed in Queensland in order to make preliminary arrangements, which included making alterations to a cricket ground to accommodate the match. In May 1864 the Committee organised for a Brisbane side to play an Ipswich side in order to determine which players should represent Queensland against New South Wales. In July 1864 the Committee held a final meeting after the match had taken place to settle the accounts and consider preparations for future engagements.

As of February 1865 another Intercolonial match had been proposed and the Intercolonial Cricket Match Committee was reformed with responsibility for an Intercolonial Match Fund. The Committee was forced to change practice days for the Queensland side in March due to a scheduling clash with the Brisbane Cricket Club, and in May the Committee proposed that in order to improve the practice and proficiency of the Queensland side a Queensland Cricket Association should be formed composed of delegates from each club who would be under the direction of the Committee itself, and in June the body was formed and inaugurated, however by 1866 it had disbanded.

In January 1867 a media report observed that cricket was thriving in Queensland, with approximately six clubs in Brisbane and active clubs also existing in Ipswich and Toowoomba, and proposed that a Queensland Cricket Association be formed to settle disputes in the sport noting that other colonies already had such bodies. In March an Indigenous Cricket team visited Brisbane, and a committee formed to organise matches decided to save any surplus funds raised for the visit be held in trust for a Queensland Cricketing Association if it was formed, and in September a Queensland Cricket Association was established in Brisbane. The Association was still in existence as of 1874, however in May that year the Association observed that many clubs were not represented in the body and it was decided that it should print and distribute its rules and urge clubs to appoint delegates as soon as possible. In April 1875 the captain of the Gympie cricket team complained that the Queensland Cricket Association had refused to schedule a match between a Brisbane and Gympie side, and in November the body was harshly criticised as being a "so-called "Queensland Cricket Association" which has never held a meeting or done an act within the memory of man."

In March 1876 a meeting was held at the Royal Hotel in Brisbane attended by approximately fifty at which it was proposed to form a new body in Brisbane to be called the Queensland Cricket Association (Q.C.A.) and the proposal was unanimously carried. The body was to have a committee consisting of a President, two vice-presidents, a secretary, and a treasurer, to be elected by delegates of member cricket clubs. It was decided that for a club to qualify for membership in the Association it must have twenty members and that clubs would have one delegate in the Association for every twenty members with a maximum of five delegates. An objection was raised at the meeting, suggesting that clubs with over one hundred members would be under-represented, but concerns were dismissed with the reasoning that it was better to encourage many small clubs rather than a small number of large clubs.

=== Club cricket era: 1876–1897 ===
The first meeting of the delegates of the Q.C.A. was held on 5 April 1876, at the Australian Hotel in Brisbane, at which a subcommittee drafted Association rules which were decided on at a second meeting on 20 April. In late April 1876 the Q.C.A. received a letter regarding an English cricket team which was to tour Australia and had offered to visit Queensland if the Association could cover costs. The Association made an offer of 600 pounds in total for the English XI to visit the colony which was rejected. In September the Q.C.A. drew up rules for a "Challenge Cup" competition for clubs to compete in, and the inaugural 1876–77 season began in October marking the beginning of senior club cricket under the Q.C.A..

=== Organised Club Cricket: 1897–Early 1900s ===
In 1897, the Queensland Cricket Association restructured club competition by forming an electorate-based cricket competition in Brisbane, replacing the older club system. This marked the establishment of organised Premier cricket in the state. Electorate teams such as North Brisbane, South Brisbane, Fortitude Valley, Toombul, Toowong, and Woolloongabba competed in the inaugural season starting in October 1897.

=== 20th Century ===
The Gabba (Brisbane Cricket Ground), established as a cricket venue in the late 1890s, hosted its first Test match in November 1931 when Australia played South Africa. This brought international cricket to Queensland's capital, a major milestone in the sport's development in the state.

=== 21st century ===
The Gabba is slated for redevelopment as part of Brisbane's 2032 Olympic planning, which will reshape the landscape for major sports events in the state.

=== Queensland Women's Cricket Association ===
The Queensland Women’s Cricket Association was founded in the 1920s, but only began formally in 1929, with the Wynnum Women’s Cricket team. In this team Edna Newfong and Mabel Crouch were chosen as players, the first Aboriginal women to represent Australia in any sport. It was a major achievement in the 1930s as Aboriginal women had to face both racist and sexist disadvantages, all the while being under the control of the Aboriginals Protection and Restriction of the Sale of Opium Act 1897, which legally restricted civil rights to Aboriginal people.

== Presidents and Chairs of Queensland Cricket ==
Years	Head (title)	Notes
1920–1926	Jack Hutcheon (Chairman)	Elected to the QCA executive in 1919, served as Chairman from 1920 before becoming President of the association in 1926.
1926–1957	Jack Hutcheon (President)	Served as the Association's leading office-holder until his death in 1957.
Mid 1990s	Dr Cam Battersby AM (Chairman)	Served as Chairman in the mid-1990s, exact dates unclear.
1999	Damian Mullins (Chairman)	Described as the youngest Chairman of Queensland Cricket since Hutcheon.
2019-2023	Chris Simpson (Chair)	Appointed to the board in 2017, became Chair in 2019 and served until 2023.
September 2023- present	Kirsten Pike (Chair)	Appointed Chair in September 2023, the 18th person to hold the role. Kristen is the first women to hold the role.

== See also ==
- Cricket in Queensland
- Women's cricket
