= Northern Territory Cricket =

Australian cricket governing body

- Official logo of Northern Territory Cricket
- Sport: Cricket
- Abbreviation: NTC
- Founded: 1978; 48 years ago
- Affiliation: Cricket Australia
- Headquarters: Marrara Cricket Ground
- Location: Marrara, Darwin
- President: Bruce Walker
- Coach: Johan Botha

Official website
- www.ntcricket.com.au
- (Northern Territory)
- (Australia)

Northern Territory Cricket, formally the Northern Territory Cricket Association, is the governing body for cricket in the Northern Territory of Australia.

== Affiliations ==
The association is affiliated with Cricket Australia. The Alice Springs Cricket Association is a member association of Northern Territory Cricket, Darwin and District Cricket, Katherine District Cricket and Tennant Creek Cricket Association.

== Competitions ==
The association supports the management of the Darwin and Districts cricket, Alice Springs, Tennant Creek and Katherine cricket competitions. The annual Imparja Cup Indigenous cricket tournament is hosted by Northern Territory Cricket.

Northern Territory Cricket also support a number of community cricket carnivals that lead up into the Imparja Cup.

Carnivals include the Lingalonga Cup in Batchelor, the Dingo Cup in Timber Creek, the Nitmiluk Cup in Katherine, the Barra Cup in Borroloola, the Wauchope vs the World carnival in Wauchope, the Uluru Cup and the Rossy Williams Shield in Tennant Creek.

== See also ==
- Sport in the Northern Territory
