= Gardens Oval =

Sports venue in Darwin, Northern Territory

Coordinates: 12°26′46.78″S 130°50′03.22″E

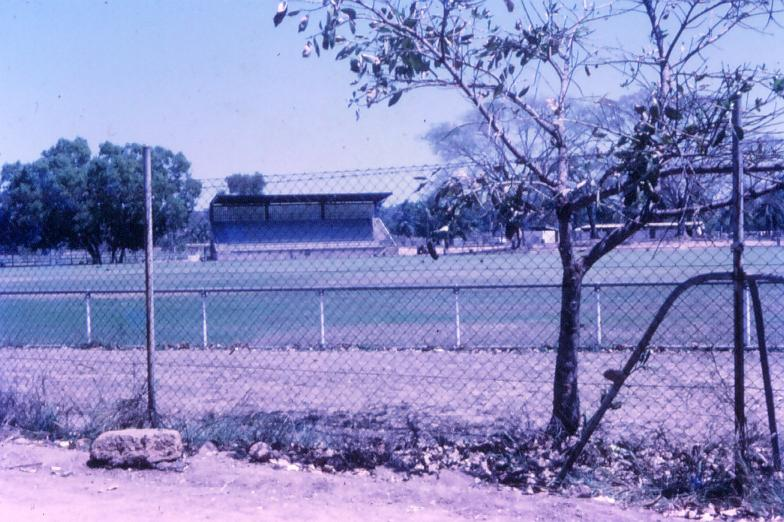
- Gardens Oval in 1972
- Interactive map of Gardens Oval

Ground information
- Location: The Gardens, Northern Territory, Australia
- Country: Australia
- Establishment: 2002 (first recorded match)
- Capacity: Unknown

International information
- First women's ODI: 21 July 2007: Australia v New Zealand
- Last women's ODI: 29 July 2007: Australia v New Zealand
- Only women's T20I: 19 July 2007: Australia v New Zealand

Team information
Waratah (NTFL)	(1954-)
AFL Northern Territory / NTFL	(1954-1990)
NT Thunder (NEAFL)	(2010)
- As of 7 September 2020; Source: Ground profile

Gardens Oval (originally the Botanical Gardens Oval) is an Australian football oval and cricket ground complex in The Gardens, Northern Territory, Australia. The complex has two ovals; the main one has spectator facilities including covered grandstands. Gardens No.1 Oval was the home of Northern Territory Football League prior to the opening of Marrara Oval. It is currently home to the Waratah Football Club, which plays in the Northern Territory Football League competition.

== History ==
Australian rules football has been played on the ground since the 1950s; the ground was being prepared as a purpose built venue for the sport as early as 1950 as a replacement for the ailing Darwin Oval.

Soccer and rugby league were regularly played on the oval from 1953.

The first recorded cricket match on the ground was in 2002 when Northern Territory played Queensland Academy of Sport. The ground held its only first-class match in 2006 when the touring Indians against New Zealand Whites. In 2007, the ground played host to four matches in the World Cricket League Division Three, a tournament for associate members of the International Cricket Council. The ground also held five Women's One Day Internationals between Australia Women and New Zealand Women in 2007, as well as a single Women's Twenty20 International between the same sides as part of the same series. The stadium was the venue for four matches of the 2026 Top End T20 Series, including the first playoff.

In the early 1980s the NTFL played games against AFL teams as preseason warm up games. These games were the idea of Kevin Sheedy, the coach of Essendon AFL. These games, played on Australia Day each year, lead to many indigenous players being recruited to the AFL, such as Michael Long.
