= 2015 New South Wales Swifts season =

NSW Swifts season

New South Wales Swifts
- 2015 season
- Head coach: Rob Wright
- Asst. coach: Megan Anderson
- Manager: Toni Kidwell
- Captain: Kimberlee Green
- Vice-captain: Sharni Layton; Abbey McCulloch
- Main venue: Sydney Olympic Park Sports Centre

Season results
- Wins–losses: 10–3 (4 draws)
- Regular season: 2nd (Australian Conference)
- Finals placing: 2nd
- Team colours

New South Wales Swifts seasons
- ← 2014 2016 →

The 2015 New South Wales Swifts season saw New South Wales Swifts compete in the 2015 ANZ Championship. Swifts finished the regular season in second place in the Australian Conference. In the play-offs, they defeated West Coast Fever and Waikato Bay of Plenty Magic but twice lost narrowly to Queensland Firebirds in both the Australian Conference final and the Grand Final. It was Swifts' first appearance in the title decider since their successful 2008 campaign.

== Players ==
=== Player movements ===
Summary of 2015 player movements
▲ Gains	▼ Losses
Jade Clarke (Mainland Tactix); Julie Corletto (Northern Mystics); Erin Hoare (Melbourne Vixens); Stephanie Wood (Queensland Fusion)	Carla Dziwoki (Melbourne Vixens); Maddie Hay (NNSW Waratahs); April Letton (West Coast Fever); Brooke Miller; Sonia Mkoloma (retired); Gretel Tippett (Queensland Firebirds); Sarah Wall

=== 2015 roster ===
2015 New South Wales Swifts roster
Players
Coaching staff

Nat.	Name	Position(s)	DoB	Height
(England)	Jade Clarke	C, WA	17 October 1983 (aged 31)	1.74 m (5 ft 9 in)
(Australia)	Julie Corletto	GD, WD, GK	10 October 1986 (aged 28)	1.84 m (6 ft 0 in)
(Australia)	Taylah Davies	WA, C	3 October 1994 (aged 20)	1.70 m (5 ft 7 in)
(Australia)	Kimberlee Green (c)	C, WA	5 March 1986 (aged 28)	1.76 m (5 ft 9 in)
(Australia)	Paige Hadley	C, WA, WD	26 August 1992 (aged 22)	1.73 m (5 ft 8 in)
(Australia)	Erin Hoare	GS, GA	17 June 1989 (aged 25)	1.94 m (6 ft 4 in)
(Australia)	Sharni Layton (cc)	GK, GD, WD	6 June 1988 (aged 26)	1.88 m (6 ft 2 in)
(Australia)	Abbey McCulloch (cc)	WD, C, GD	12 February 1990 (aged 25)	1.78 m (5 ft 10 in)
(Australia)	Susan Pettitt	GA, GS	23 March 1984 (aged 30)	1.80 m (5 ft 11 in)
(Australia)	Caitlin Thwaites	GS, GA	29 December 1986 (aged 28)	1.88 m (6 ft 2 in)
(Australia)	Micaela Wilson	GK, GD, WD	3 November 1992 (aged 22)	1.88 m (6 ft 2 in)
(Australia)	Stephanie Wood	GA, WA	28 November 1991 (aged 23)	1.75 m (5 ft 9 in)

Head coach

- (Australia) Rob Wright

Assistant coach

- (Australia) Megan Anderson
  Anita Keelan
  Apprentice Coach:
  Amber Cross

Manager: Toni Kidwell
Physiotherapist:
Paula Peralta
Daniel Vukovic
Strength and conditioning:
Jason Howell
Performance Analyst:
Bjorn Maddern
Doctor:
Dr Grace Bryant OAM
Sport Psychologist:
Sam Rand
Dietician:
Karen Haddad

Notes

- (c) – Captain
- (cc) – Co-captain
- (vc) – Vice-captain
- – Injury / maternity leave
- (TRP) – Temporary Replacement Player

=== Debutants ===
- Jade Clarke and Julie Corletto both make their Swifts debut in Round 1 against Southern Steel.
- Stephanie Wood made her ANZ Championship debut for Swifts in Round 2 against Waikato Bay of Plenty Magic.
- Erin Hoare made her Swifts debut in Round 7 against Adelaide Thunderbirds.

=== Gold medallists ===
Julie Corletto, Kimberlee Green, Paige Hadley, Sharni Layton and Caitlin Thwaites were all members of the Australia team that won the gold medal at the 2015 Netball World Cup. The squad also included former Swifts' players, Erin Bell and Rebecca Bulley.

== Summer Shootout ==
Between 6 and 8 February, New South Wales Swifts hosted the Summer Shootout at Netball Central, Sydney Olympic Park. This was the first major netball tournament to be held at the venue. All ten ANZ Championship teams participated in the three-day tournament. A total of 25 games, consisting of both full length and shortened games consisting of two 15-minute periods, were played over the weekend.

Fri 6 Feb	New South Wales Swifts	58–47	Northern Mystics
6:30pm

Sat 7 Feb	New South Wales Swifts	25–19	Central Pulse
9:00am

Sat 7 Feb	New South Wales Swifts	21–25	West Coast Fever
2:30pm

Sat 7 Feb	New South Wales Swifts	27–25	Waikato Bay of Plenty Magic
5:30pm

Sun 8 Feb	New South Wales Swifts	49–46	Melbourne Vixens
2:00pm

== Regular season ==
=== Fixtures and results ===
Round 1

Sun 1 March	Southern Steel	62 - 68	New South Wales Swifts	Stadium Southland
7.10 PM (NZDT)	Jhaniele Fowler-Reid 46/55 (84%); Te Paea Selby-Rickit 16/19 (84%)	Report	Susan Pettitt 29/32 (91%); Caitlin Thwaites 39/43 (91%)

Round 2

Mon 9 March	Waikato Bay of Plenty Magic	43 - 48	New South Wales Swifts	ASB Arena
7:40 PM (NZDT)	Joanne Harten 15; Malia Paseka 10/17 (59%); Ellen Halpenny 18/25 (72%)	Report	Susan Pettitt 7/10 (70%); Caitlin Thwaites 34/42 (81%); Stephanie Wood 7/10 (70%)

Round 3

Sun 15 March	New South Wales Swifts	47 - 47	Queensland Firebirds	Sydney Olympic Park Sports Centre
12.18 PM (AEDT)	Susan Pettitt 29/37 (78%); Caitlin Thwaites 18/22 (82%)	Report	Romelda Aiken 36/46 (78%); Gretel Tippett 11/14 (79%)

Round 4

Mon 23 March	New South Wales Swifts	59 - 59	West Coast Fever	Sydney Olympic Park Sports Centre
7.18 PM (AEDT)	Susan Pettitt 23; Caitlin Thwaites 36	Report	Caitlin Bassett 51; Natalie Medhurst 8

Round 5

Mon 30 March	Queensland Firebirds	51 - 47	New South Wales Swifts	Brisbane Convention and Exhibition Centre
7:18 PM (AEST)	Romelda Aiken 43; Gretel Tippett ?	Report	Susan Pettitt ? Caitlin Thwaites ?

Round 6

New South Wales Swifts received a bye.

Round 7

Sun 12 April	Adelaide Thunderbirds	56 - 49	New South Wales Swifts	Netball SA Stadium
1:48 PM (ACST)	Carla Borrego 39/46 (85%); Erin Bell ?	Report; Stats	Susan Pettitt ? Caitlin Thwaites ? Erin Hoare ?

Round 8

Sun 19 April	New South Wales Swifts	66 - 50	Northern Mystics	Sydney Olympic Park Sports Centre
12:18 PM (AEST)	Susan Pettitt ? Caitlin Thwaites 30/33 (91%)	Report; Stats	Maria Tutaia ? Cathrine Latu ? Paula Griffin 10/16 (63%)

Round 9

Sat 25 April	Central Pulse	47 - 47	New South Wales Swifts	TSB Bank Arena
4:10 PM (NZST)	Jodi Brown 21/25 (84%); Ameliaranne Wells 26/33 (79%)	Report	Susan Pettitt 22/26 (85%); Caitlin Thwaites 25/29 (86%)

Round 10

Sun 3 May	New South Wales Swifts	67 - 43	Melbourne Vixens	Allphones Arena
12:18 PM (AEST)	Susan Pettitt 28/30 (93%); Caitlin Thwaites 39/41 (95%)	Report	Tegan Philip ? Karyn Bailey ?	Attendance: 10,370

Round 11

Sun 10 May	New South Wales Swifts	65 - 54	Adelaide Thunderbirds	Sydney Olympic Park Sports Centre
2:18 PM (AEST)	Susan Pettitt 27/31 (87%); Caitlin Thwaites 38/42 (90%)	Report	Carla Borrego 39/47 (83%); Erin Bell 15/17 (88%)

Round 12

Sun 17 May	New South Wales Swifts	68 - 49	Mainland Tactix	Sydney Olympic Park Sports Centre
2:18 PM (AEST)	Susan Pettitt 32/34 (94%); Caitlin Thwaites 31/35 (89%); Stephanie Wood 5/6 (83%)	Report	Mwai Kumwenda 33/35 (94%); Bailey Mes 16/21 (76%)

Round 13

Sun 24 May	Melbourne Vixens	48 - 52	New South Wales Swifts	Margaret Court Arena
2:18 PM (AEST)	Tegan Philip 21/27 (78%); Karyn Bailey 27/32 (84%)	Report	Susan Pettitt 23/27 (85%); Caitlin Thwaites 29/38 (76%)

Round 14

Sat 30 May	West Coast Fever	56 - 63	New South Wales Swifts	Perth Arena
10:18 AM (AWST)	Caitlin Bassett 44/51 (86%); Natalie Medhurst 12/15 (80%)	Report	Susan Pettitt 28/32 (88%); Caitlin Thwaites 35/37 (95%)	Attendance: 9,703

=== Standings ===
2015 Australian Conference
Pos	Team	Pld	W	D	L	GF	GA	G%	Pts
1	Queensland Firebirds	13	11	1	1	708	608	116.4%	23
2	New South Wales Swifts	13	8	3	2	746	665	112.2%	19
3	West Coast Fever	13	9	1	3	744	701	106.1%	19
4	Melbourne Vixens	13	7	0	6	670	657	102.0%	14
5	Adelaide Thunderbirds	13	4	2	7	667	682	97.8%	10
2015 New Zealand Conference
Pos	Team	Pld	W	D	L	GF	GA	G%	Pts
1	Northern Mystics	13	7	2	4	682	695	98.1%	16
2	Waikato Bay of Plenty Magic	13	5	1	7	643	663	97.0%	11
3	Southern Steel	13	3	2	8	759	775	97.9%	8
4	Central Pulse	13	3	2	8	620	656	94.5%	8
5	Mainland Tactix	13	1	0	12	664	801	82.9%	2

Qualified for Conference finals
Qualified for Elimination finals

- Pld = Games played
- W = Win (2 points)
- D = Draw (1 points)
- L = Loss (0 points)
- GF = Goals For
- GA = Goals Against
- G% = Goal percentage (= 100 × GF/GA)
- Pts = Points

== Play-offs ==
=== Elimination Final ===
Australian Conference

Fri 5 June; 7:18 PM (AEST)	Stats	New South Wales Swifts	60–53	West Coast Fever	Sydney Olympic Park Sports Centre
Fri 5 June; 7:18 PM (AEST)	Stats	Caitlin Thwaites 32/34 (94%); Susan Pettitt 28/29 (97%)		Caitlin Bassett 37/40 (93%); Natalie Medhurst 16/18 (89%)	Sydney Olympic Park Sports Centre

=== Conference Finals ===
Australian Conference

Sun 7 June; 12:18 PM (AEST)	Stats	Queensland Firebirds	55–44	New South Wales Swifts	Brisbane Entertainment Centre; Attendance: 5,175
Sun 7 June; 12:18 PM (AEST)	Stats	Romelda Aiken 36/39 (92%); Gretel Tippett ?		Susan Pettitt ? Caitlin Thwaites 17/21 (81%); Stephanie Wood ?	Brisbane Entertainment Centre; Attendance: 5,175

=== Semi-final ===
Sun 14 June; 7:10 PM (NZST)	Stats	Waikato Bay of Plenty Magic	52–60	New South Wales Swifts	Claudelands Arena; Attendance: 4,200
Sun 14 June; 7:10 PM (NZST)	Stats	Joanne Harten 39/44 (89%); Malia Paseka ? Ellen Halpenny ?		Susan Pettitt 27/29 (93%); Caitlin Thwaites 33/36 (92%)	Claudelands Arena; Attendance: 4,200

=== Grand Final ===
Sun 21 June; 12:10 PM (AEST)	Stats	Queensland Firebirds	57–56	New South Wales Swifts	Brisbane Entertainment Centre	Fox Sports; Sky Sport
Sun 21 June; 12:10 PM (AEST)	Stats	Romelda Aiken 47/51 (92%); Gretel Tippett 10/17 (59%)		Susan Pettitt 26/28 (93%); Caitlin Thwaites 30/34 (88%)	Brisbane Entertainment Centre	Fox Sports; Sky Sport

== Award winners ==
=== NSW Swifts awards ===
Award	Winner
QBE NSW Swifts MVP	Caitlin Thwaites
NSW Swifts Members' Player of the Year	Sharni Layton
NSW Swifts Players' Player of the Year	Sharni Layton
NSW Swifts Coaches' Player Award	Susan Pettitt

=== ANZ Championship awards ===
Award	Winner
ANZ Championship Finals Series MVP	(Australia) Sharni Layton

=== All Star Team ===
Position	Player
GA	(Australia) Susan Pettitt
WA	(Australia) Kimberlee Green
GD	(Australia) Julie Corletto
GK	(Australia) Sharni Layton

=== Australian Netball Awards ===
Award	Winner	Team
Australian ANZ Championship Player of the Year	Sharni Layton	
