= Abbey McCulloch =

Australian netball player

Personal information
- Full name: Abbey McCulloch
- Born: 12 February 1990 (age 36) Sydney, New South Wales, Australia
- Occupation: Teacher
- Height: 178 cm (5 ft 10 in)
- Relative: Kaarle McCulloch (sister)
- School: Endeavour Sports High School
- University: University of Western Sydney; RMIT University

Netball career
- Playing positions: WD, C, GD
Years	Club team	Apps
2009–2011	NNSW Blues	22
2012	NNSW Waratahs	11
2013	Queensland Firebirds	11
2014–2018	New South Wales Swifts	43
2017–2019	Sutherland Stingrays	
2018–2019	NNSW Waratahs	
Coaching career
- Years: Team
- 2018–2020: Ascham School
- 2020–: Westfields Sports High School
- 2020–: Sutherland Stingrays U23s

Abbey McCulloch (born 12 February 1990) is an Australian former netball player. Between 2014 and 2018, McCulloch played for New South Wales Swifts. She captained Swifts during the 2017 and 2018 seasons. She previously played for NNSW Waratahs and Queensland Firebirds.

== Early life, family and education ==
McCulloch is originally from Bowral in the Southern Highlands. Her family later settled in the Sutherland Shire. Her older sister, Kaarle McCulloch, represented Australia at the 2012 Summer Olympics as a cyclist. Abbey and Kaarle both attended Endeavour Sports High School. Between 2008 and 2012, she attended the University of Western Sydney where she gained a Bachelor of Business and Commerce in Sport Management and a Master of Teaching. In 2014 she gained a Diploma of Career Development from RMIT University.

== Playing career ==
=== New South Wales ===
Between 2006 and 2011, McCulloch represented New South Wales in the Australian National Netball Championships at under-17, under-19 and under-21 levels, winning six consecutive national titles.

=== Australian Netball League ===
Between 2009 and 2012, McCulloch played for both NNSW Blues and NNSW Waratahs in the Australian Netball League. Between 2009 and 2011 she made 22 appearances for the Blues. In 2012 she made 11 appearances for the Waratahs. She was vice captain of the Waratahs team that were the 2012 ANL runners up. In 2019, McCulloch finished her senior playing career with Waratahs in the ANL. She was a member of the Waratahs team that were the 2019 ANL runners up. She announced her retirement shortly after playing for Waratahs in the grand final.

=== Queensland Firebirds ===
McCulloch played for Queensland Firebirds during the 2013 ANZ Championship season. Together with Kim Ravaillion and Gabi Simpson, she made her ANZ Championship and Firebirds debut in a Round 1 match against Southern Steel. She went onto make 11 ANZ Championship appearances for Firebirds and helped them reach the 2013 grand final.

=== New South Wales Swifts ===
Between 2014 and 2018, McCulloch made 44 appearances for New South Wales Swifts in the ANZ Championship and Suncorp Super Netball. Together with Sharni Layton and Caitlin Thwaites, she made her Swifts debut in the 2014 ANZ Championship Round 1 match against West Coast Fever. McCulloch was a member of the Swifts teams that were ANZ Championship runners up in both 2015 and 2016. She captained Swifts during the 2017 and 2018 seasons and in 2018 was named the NSW Swifts Players' Player of the Year. In September 2018 it was announced that McCulloch would miss the 2019 Suncorp Super Netball season because of a knee injury. She subsequently played for NNSW Waratahs during the 2019 season before announcing her retirement as a netball player in July 2019.

== Teacher and netball coach ==
McCulloch is a secondary school teacher. Since 2012, she has worked for the NSW Department of Education. She has worked at several schools in the Sydney area including her own former school, Endeavour Sports High School and Leumeah High School. Between 2018 and 2020 she served as head of netball at Ascham School. In 2020 she was appointed head of netball at Westfields Sports High School.

Since 2017, McCulloch has served as a player-coach with Sutherland Stingrays in the Netball NSW Premier League. In October 2020 she was appointed head coach of their under-23 team. In March 2020 she was appointed assistant coach at the QBE Swifts Academy. She also owns her own coaching company, Per4orm Netball

McCulloch has also worked as a sideline commentator for Nine Network.

== Honours ==
New South Wales Swifts

- ANZ Championship
  - Runners Up: 2015, 2016

Queensland Firebirds

- ANZ Championship
  - Runners Up: 2013

NNSW Waratahs

- Australian Netball League
  - Runners up: 2012, 2019

New South Wales

- Australian National Netball Championships
  - Winner: Under-17 (2006, 2007), Under-19 (2008, 2009), Under-21 (2010, 2011)

Individual

- NSW Swifts Players' Player of the Year
  - Winner: 2018
