= Netball Central =

Netball Central may refer to:

- Netball Central, Sydney, Australia
- Netball Central, governing body affiliated to Central Pulse and Netball New Zealand
