= Matilda McDonell =

Australian netball player

Matilda (Tilly) McDonell
Personal information
- Full name: Tilly McDonell
- Born: 22 June 2000 (age 26) Sydney, New South Wales, Australia
- Height: 1.85 m (6 ft 1 in)
- School: St Paul's Grammar School
- University: University of New South Wales

Netball career
- Playing positions: GK, GD, WD
Years	Club team	Apps
2019–2026	Giants Netball	

Matilda McDonell (born 22 June 2000) is an Australian former netball player who played for the Giants in the Suncorp Super Netball league, she played her final game on the 22nd of March 2026.

McDonell was contracted by the Giants ahead of the 2019 season. She represented New South Wales and Australia at underage level and prior to being signed by the Giants was an influential player in the second-tier Australian Netball League and Netball NSW Premier League competitions. McDonell completed a Bachelor of Psychological Science/Law at the University of New South Wales, and announced that she intends to become a solicitor following her retirement.
