= 2014 New South Wales Swifts season =

NSW Swifts season

New South Wales Swifts
- 2014 season
- Head coach: Rob Wright
- Asst. coach: Megan Anderson
- Manager: Toni Kidwell
- Captain: Kimberlee Green
- Main venue: Sydney Olympic Park Sports Centre

Season results
- Wins–losses: 9–5
- Regular season: 3rd
- Finals placing: 4th
- Team colours

New South Wales Swifts seasons
- ← 2013 2015 →

The 2014 New South Wales Swifts season saw New South Wales Swifts compete in the 2014 ANZ Championship. Rob Wright replaced Lisa Beehag as head coach. Swifts finished the regular season in third place but subsequently lost to Waikato Bay of Plenty Magic in the minor semi-final.

== Players ==
=== Player movements ===
Summary of 2014 player movements
▲ Gains	▼ Losses
Taylah Davies (NNSW Waratahs); Maddie Hay (NNSW Blues); Sharni Layton (Adelaide Thunderbirds); Abbey McCulloch (Queensland Firebirds); Brooke Miller (NNSW Waratahs/AIS); Gretel Tippett (Queensland Firebirds); Caitlin Thwaites (Central Pulse); Sarah Wall ^{(Note 1)}; Micaela Wilson (Melbourne Vixens)	Mo'onia Gerrard; Samantha May (Hertfordshire Mavericks); Melissa Tallent (NNSW Waratahs); Vanessa Ware (retired); Ashlee Weir; Amorette Wild (Queensland Firebirds)

Notes

- ^1 Sarah Wall previously played for Melbourne Vixens and Queensland Firebirds.

=== 2014 roster ===
2014 New South Wales Swifts roster
Players
Coaching staff

Nat.	Name	Position(s)	DoB	Height
(Australia)	Taylah Davies (TRP)	WA, C	3 October 1994 (aged 19)	1.70 m (5 ft 7 in)
(Australia)	Carla Dziwoki	GS, GA	29 August 1982 (aged 31)	1.86 m (6 ft 1 in)
(Australia)	Kimberlee Green (c)	C, WA	5 March 1986 (aged 27)	1.76 m (5 ft 9 in)
(Australia)	Paige Hadley	C, WA, WD	26 August 1992 (aged 21)	1.73 m (5 ft 8 in)
(Australia)	Maddie Hay	C, WD	11 April 1995 (aged 18)	1.74 m (5 ft 9 in)
(Australia)	Sharni Layton	GK, GD, WD	6 June 1988 (aged 25)	1.88 m (6 ft 2 in)
(Australia)	April Letton	GK, GD	19 April 1990 (aged 23)	1.85 m (6 ft 1 in)
(Australia)	Abbey McCulloch	WD, C, GD	12 February 1990 (aged 24)	1.78 m (5 ft 10 in)
(Australia)	Brooke Miller	WA, C	14 April 1992 (aged 21)	1.73 m (5 ft 8 in)
(England)	Sonia Mkoloma	GD, GK	17 January 1979 (aged 35)	1.86 m (6 ft 1 in)
(Australia)	Susan Pettitt	GA, GS	23 March 1984 (aged 29)	1.80 m (5 ft 11 in)
(Australia)	Gretel Tippett	GA,GS	3 July 1993 (aged 20)	1.91 m (6 ft 3 in)
(Australia)	Caitlin Thwaites	GS, GA	29 December 1986 (aged 27)	1.88 m (6 ft 2 in)
(Australia)	Sarah Wall	WA, C	16 October 1984 (aged 29)	1.74 m (5 ft 9 in)
(Australia)	Micaela Wilson (TRP)	GK, GD, WD	3 November 1992 (aged 21)	1.88 m (6 ft 2 in)

Head coach

- (Australia) Rob Wright

Assistant coach

- (Australia) Megan Anderson

Manager: Toni Kidwell
Technical Assistant Coach: Anita Keelan
Defensive Specialist Coach:
Mo'onia Gerrard
Midcourt Specialist Coach:
Megan Simpson
Apprentice Coaches:
Briony Akle
Moira Gaha
Performance Analyst:
Bjorn Maddern
Physiotherapist:
Paula Peralta
Brett Doring
Daniel Vukovic
Strength and conditioning:
Jason Howell

Notes

- (c) – Captain
- (cc) – Co-captain
- (vc) – Vice-captain
- – Injury / maternity leave
- (TRP) – Temporary Replacement Player

=== Debutants ===
- Sharni Layton, Abbey McCulloch and Caitlin Thwaites all make their New South Wales Swifts debut in Round 1 against West Coast Fever.
- Maddie Hay and Brooke Miller both make their Swifts and ANZ Championship debut in Round 2 against Canterbury Tactix.
- Taylah Davies and Micaela Wilson both make their Swifts debut in Round 3 against Adelaide Thunderbirds.
- Sarah Wall made her Swifts debut in Round 4 against Queensland Firebirds.
- Gretel Tippett made her Swifts debut in Round 5 against Central Pulse.

=== Gold medallists ===
Kimberlee Green, Sharni Layton and Caitlin Thwaites were all members of the Australia team that won the gold medal at the 2014 Commonwealth Games.

== Regular season ==
=== Fixtures and results ===
Round 1

Sunday 2 March	New South Wales Swifts	54 – 51	West Coast Fever	Sydney Olympic Park Sports Centre
12:18pm	Susan Pratley 30/33 (91%); Caitlin Thwaites 24/28 (86%)	Report	Caitlin Bassett 42/50 (84%); Natalie Medhurst 9/12 (75%)

Round 2

Sunday 9 March	Mainland Tactix	57 – 68	New South Wales Swifts	CBS Canterbury Arena
7:20pm	Mwai Kumwenda 46/49 (94%); Sophia Fenwick 11/22 (50%)	Report	Caitlin Thwaites 24/26 (92%); Carla Dziwoki 15/18 (83%); Susan Pratley 29/35 (83%)

Round 3

Monday 17 March	Adelaide Thunderbirds	50 – 49	New South Wales Swifts	Netball SA Stadium
7:18pm	Carla Borrego ? Erin Bell ?	Report	Caitlin Thwaites ? Susan Pratley ?

Round 4

Sunday 23 March	New South Wales Swifts	53 – 48	Queensland Firebirds	Sydney Olympic Park Sports Centre
12:18pm	Caitlin Thwaites 29/32 (91%); Susan Pratley 23/30 (77%); Carla Dziwoki 1/1 (100%)	Report	Romelda Aiken 36/50 (72%); Amy Wild 12/14 (86%)

Round 5

Monday 31 March	New South Wales Swifts	63 – 45	Central Pulse	Sydney Olympic Park Sports Centre
7:48pm	Caitlin Thwaites 30/36 (83%); Susan Pratley 27/30 (90%); Gretel Tippett 6/11 (55%)	Report	Donna Wilkins 13/16 (81%); Irene van Dyk 32/34 (94%)

Round 6

New South Wales Swifts received a bye.

Round 7

Sunday 13 April	New South Wales Swifts	50 – 56	Melbourne Vixens	Sydney Olympic Park Sports Centre
12:18pm	Caitlin Thwaites ? Susan Pratley 28/33 (85%)	Report	Tegan Caldwell ? Karyn Bailey ? Catherine Cox 18/19 (95%)

Round 8

Sunday 20 April	Queensland Firebirds	55 – 40	New South Wales Swifts	Brisbane Convention & Exhibition Centre
12:18pm	Romelda Aiken 36; Ameliaranne Wells 10; Amy Wild 9	Report	Caitlin Thwaites 13; Susan Pratley 24; Gretel Tippett 3	Attendance: 3,000

Round 9

Friday 25 April	New South Wales Swifts	65 – 52	Southern Steel	AIS Arena
1:48pm	Caitlin Thwaites 32/35 (91%); Susan Pratley 23/27 (85%); Carla Dziwoki 9/10 (90%); Gretel Tippett 1/3 (33%)	Report; Stats	Jodi Brown 8/10 (80%); Jhaniele Fowler-Reid 42/45 (93%); Te Paea Selby-Rickit 2/4 (50%)

Round 10

Sunday 4 May	Melbourne Vixens	50 – 54	New South Wales Swifts	Hisense Arena
12:18pm	Tegan Caldwell 22/24 (92%); Karyn Bailey 14/18 (78%); Catherine Cox 14/18 (78%)	Report	Caitlin Thwaites 26/31 (84%); Susan Pratley 28/32 (88%)

Round 11

Monday 12 May	West Coast Fever	47 – 58	New South Wales Swifts	Perth Arena
6:48pm	Caitlin Bassett 31/37 (84%); Natalie Medhurst 16/18 (89%)	Report; Stats	Caitlin Thwaites 33/42 (79%); Susan Pratley 25/31 (81%)

Round 12

Sunday 18 May	New South Wales Swifts	45 – 42	Adelaide Thunderbirds	Allphones Arena
2:18pm	Caitlin Thwaites ? Susan Pratley ?	Report	Carla Borrego ? Erin Bell ?	Attendance: 10,118

Round 13

Sunday 25 May	New South Wales Swifts	55 – 43	Waikato Bay of Plenty Magic	Sydney Olympic Park Sports Centre
2:18pm	Caitlin Thwaites 25/31 (81%); Susan Pratley 30/38 (79%)	Report; Stats	Joanne Harten 22/28 (79%); Ellen Halpenny 12/15 (80%); Malia Paseka 9/13 (69%)

Round 14

Sunday 1 June	Northern Mystics	56 – 53	New South Wales Swifts	The Trusts Arena
7:20pm	Maria Tutaia 24/31 (77%); Cathrine Latu 32/33 (97%)	Report	Caitlin Thwaites 34/40 (85%); Susan Pratley 19/24 (79%)

=== Standings ===
2014 ANZ Championship ladder
Pos	Team	Pld	W	L	GF	GA	GD	G%	Pts
1	Melbourne Vixens	13	9	4	746	592	+154	126.0	18
2	Queensland Firebirds	13	9	4	694	623	+71	111.4	18
3	New South Wales Swifts	13	9	4	707	652	+55	108.4	18
4	Waikato Bay of Plenty Magic	13	8	5	727	672	+55	108.2	16
5	Southern Steel	13	7	6	792	809	−17	97.9	14
6	Central Pulse	13	7	6	658	675	−17	97.5	14
7	Northern Mystics	13	6	7	706	752	−46	93.9	12
8	Adelaide Thunderbirds	13	5	8	663	706	−43	93.9	10
9	West Coast Fever	13	4	9	689	724	−35	95.2	8
10	Mainland Tactix	13	1	12	694	871	−177	79.7	2
Updated 2 May 2021

Qualified for Major semi-final
Qualified for Minor semi-final

- Pld = Games played
- W = Win (2 points)
- L = Loss (0 points)
- GF = Goals For
- GA = Goals Against
- GD = Goals Difference (= GF−GA)
- G% = Goal percentage (= 100 × GF/GA)

Pts = Points

== Play-offs ==
Semifinals
9 June – John Cain Arena
Melbourne Vixens	52
Queensland Firebirds	47
8 June – Sydney SuperDome
New South Wales Swifts	49
Waikato Bay of Plenty Magic	50

Preliminary final
16 June – Brisbane Convention & Exhibition Centre
Queensland Firebirds	54
Waikato Bay of Plenty Magic	50

Grand final
22 June – John Cain Arena
Melbourne Vixens	53
Queensland Firebirds	42

=== Minor semi-final ===
Sunday 8 June; 2:18pm	Stats	New South Wales Swifts	49–50	Waikato Bay of Plenty Magic	Allphones Arena; Attendance: 5,610	Fox Sports; Sky Sport
Sunday 8 June; 2:18pm	Stats	Scoring by quarter: 14–13, 14–25, 12–14, 9–12			Allphones Arena; Attendance: 5,610	Fox Sports; Sky Sport
Sunday 8 June; 2:18pm	Stats	Caitlin Thwaites 24/27 (89%); Susan Pratley 25/29 (86%)		Joanne Harten 28/35 (80%); Ellen Halpenny 22/26 (85%)	Allphones Arena; Attendance: 5,610	Fox Sports; Sky Sport

== Award winners ==
=== NSW Swifts awards ===
Award	Winner
QBE NSW Swifts MVP	Kimberlee Green
NSW Swifts Members' Player of the Year	Kimberlee Green
NSW Swifts Players' Player of the Year	Sharni Layton
NSW Swifts Coaches' Player Award	Sarah Wall

=== ANZ Championship awards ===
Award	Winner
ANZ Championship MVP	(Australia) Kimberlee Green ^{(Note 1)}

Notes

- ^1 Award was shared with Joanne Harten (Waikato Bay of Plenty Magic).

=== All Stars ===
Position	Player
GA	(Australia) Susan Pratley
C	(Australia) Kimberlee Green
