= 2014 Queensland Firebirds season =

Queensland Firebirds season

Queensland Firebirds
- 2014 season
- Head coach: Roselee Jencke
- Captain: Laura Geitz
- Main venue: Brisbane Convention and Exhibition Centre

Season results
- Wins–losses: 10–6
- Regular season: 2nd
- Finals placing: 2nd
- Team colours

Queensland Firebirds seasons
- ← 2013 2015 →

The 2014 Queensland Firebirds season saw the Queensland Firebirds netball team compete in the 2014 ANZ Championship. Firebirds finished second during the regular season and in the overall championship. Firebirds lost both the major semi-final and the grand final to Melbourne Vixens.

== Players ==
=== Player movements ===
Gains and losses
▲ Gains	▼ Losses
Clare McMeniman (returning player); Stephanie Puopolo (Adelaide Thunderbirds); Verity Simmons (West Coast Fever); Amorette Wild (New South Wales Swifts)	Abbey McCulloch (New South Wales Swifts); Natalie Medhurst (West Coast Fever); Chelsea Pitman (West Coast Fever); Gretel Tippett (New South Wales Swifts)

=== 2014 roster ===
2014 Queensland Firebirds roster
Players
Coaching staff

Nat.	Name	Position(s)	DoB	Height
(Jamaica)	Romelda Aiken	GS, GA	19 November 1988 (aged 25)	1.96 m (6 ft 5 in)
(Australia)	Laura Clemesha	GK, GD	21 January 1992 (aged 22)	1.90 m (6 ft 3 in)
(Australia)	Laura Geitz (c)	GK, GD	4 November 1987 (aged 26)	1.85 m (6 ft 1 in)
(Australia)	Nicola Gray	GA, WA		–
(Australia)	Demelza McCloud	GD, GK	5 August 1980 (aged 33)	1.88 m (6 ft 2 in)
(Australia)	Clare McMeniman	GD, WD	11 July 1985 (aged 28)	1.84 m (6 ft 0 in)
(Australia)	Jacinta Messer	GD, GK	13 August 1986 (aged 27)	1.83 m (6 ft 0 in)
(Australia)	Stephanie Puopolo	GA, GS		–
(Australia)	Kim Ravaillion	C, WD, WA	26 July 1993 (aged 20)	1.75 m (5 ft 9 in)
(Australia)	Gabi Simpson	WD, GD, C	17 October 1992 (aged 21)	1.76 m (5 ft 9 in)
(Australia)	Verity Simmons	WA, C	19 May 1991 (aged 22)	1.70 m (5 ft 7 in)
(New Zealand)	Ameliaranne Wells	GS, GA	11 January 1991 (aged 23)	1.86 m (6 ft 1 in)
(Australia)	Amorette Wild	GA, GS, WA	10 August 1989 (aged 24)	1.78 m (5 ft 10 in)

Head coach

- (Australia) Roselee Jencke

Notes

- (c) – Captain
- (cc) – Co-captain
- (vc) – Vice-captain
- – Injury / maternity leave
- (TRP) – Temporary Replacement Player

=== Milestones ===
- Romelda Aiken became the first player to score 3500 ANZ Championship goals when she scored 46 from 53 in Round 13 against Central Pulse.
- Clare McMeniman made her 100th senior club appearance.

=== Three international captains ===
Laura Geitz, Romelda Aiken and Clare McMeniman all captained their national teams in medal winning performances. Geitz captained Australia when they won the gold medal at the 2014 Commonwealth Games. The squad also included Kim Ravaillion. Aiken was co-captain of the Jamaica team that won the bronze medal. Clare McMeniman co-captained the Australia team that won the silver medal at the 2014 Fast5 Netball World Series. Gabi Simpson, Amorette Wild were also members of the team.

== Regular season ==
=== Fixtures and results ===
Round 1

Sunday 2 March	Southern Steel	44 – 60	Queensland Firebirds	Stadium Southland Velodrome
7:20pm	Jodi Brown 11/17 (65%); Jhaniele Fowler-Reid 20/22 (91%); Te Paea Selby-Rickit 13/16 (81%)	Report	Romelda Aiken 35/44 (80%); Amy Wild 25/31 (81%)

Round 2

Sunday 9 March	Queensland Firebirds	48 – 55	Adelaide Thunderbirds	Brisbane Convention & Exhibition Centre
1:18am	Romelda Aiken ? Amy Wild 18; Ameliaranne Wells ?	Report; Stats	Carla Borrego 29; Erin Bell 26/31 (84%) ? ?

Round 3

Sunday 16 March	Melbourne Vixens	47 – 48	Queensland Firebirds	Hisense Arena
12:18pm	Tegan Caldwell 18/22 (82%); Karyn Bailey 29/37 (78%)	Report; Stats	Romelda Aiken 38/46 (83%); Amy Wild 10/16 (63%)

Round 4

Sunday 23 March	New South Wales Swifts	53 – 48	Queensland Firebirds	Sydney Olympic Park Sports Centre
12:18pm	Caitlin Thwaites 29/32 (91%); Susan Pratley 23/30 (77%); Carla Dziwoki 1/1 (100%)	Report	Romelda Aiken 36/50 (72%); Amy Wild 12/14 (86%)

Round 5

Sunday 30 March	Queensland Firebirds	58 – 50	Northern Mystics	Brisbane Convention and Exhibition Centre
1:18pm	Romelda Aiken 35/41 (85%); Amy Wild 16/22 (73%); Ameliaranne Wells 7/10 (70%)	Report	Maria Tutaia 20/24 (83%); Cathrine Latu 30/30 (100%)

Round 6

Monday 7 April	Queensland Firebirds	38 – 50	Melbourne Vixens	Brisbane Convention & Exhibition Centre
7:48pm	Romelda Aiken 25/31 (81%); Amy Wild 9/12 (75%) ? ?	Report	Tegan Caldwell 28/32 (88%); Karyn Bailey 13/17 (76%) ? ?	Attendance: 3,100

Round 7

Sunday 13 April	West Coast Fever	48 – 42	Queensland Firebirds	Challenge Stadium
12:18pm	Caitlin Bassett 39/43 (91%); Natalie Medhurst ? Kate Beveridge ? Chelsea Pitman 3/7 (43%)	Report; Stats	Romelda Aiken 24/33 (73%); Amy Wild ?	Attendance: 2,700

Round 8

Sunday 20 April	Queensland Firebirds	55 – 40	New South Wales Swifts	Brisbane Convention & Exhibition Centre
12:18pm	Romelda Aiken 36; Ameliaranne Wells 10; Amy Wild 9	Report	Caitlin Thwaites 13; Susan Pratley 24; Gretel Tippett 3	Attendance: 3,000

Round 9

Sunday 27 April	Queensland Firebirds	50 – 48	West Coast Fever	Brisbane Convention & Exhibition Centre
12:18pm	Romelda Aiken ? Amy Wild ?		Caitlin Bassett ? Natalie Medhurst ?

Round 10

Sunday 4 May	Queensland Firebirds	69 – 52	Mainland Tactix	Gold Coast Convention and Exhibition Centre
2:18pm	Romelda Aiken 54/57 (95%); Amy Wild 8/12 (67%); Ameliaranne Wells 7/8 (88%)	Report; Stats	Mwai Kumwenda 40/45 (89%); Anna Thompson 12/17 (71%)

Round 11

Sunday 11 May	Adelaide Thunderbirds	52 – 58	Queensland Firebirds	Netball SA Stadium
11:48am	Carla Borrego 25/30 (83%); Erin Bell 27/31 (87%)	Report; Stats	Romelda Aiken 40/48 (83%); Amy Wild 18/21 (86%)

Round 12

Queensland Firebirds received a bye.

Round 13

Saturday 24 May	Queensland Firebirds	60 – 33	Central Pulse	Brisbane Convention and Exhibition Centre
2:18pm	Romelda Aiken 46/53 (87%); Amy Wild 14/22 (64%)	Report	Donna Wilkins 13/16 (81%); Irene van Dyk 12/13 (92%); Paula Griffin 8/12 (67%)

Round 14

Monday 2 June	Waikato Bay of Plenty Magic	55 – 59	Queensland Firebirds	Claudelands Arena
7:40pm	Joanne Harten 29/35 (83%); Ellen Halpenny 26/34 (76%)	Report	Romelda Aiken 40/45 (89%); Amy Wild 19/20 (95%)

=== Final table ===
2014 ANZ Championship ladder
Pos	Team	Pld	W	L	GF	GA	GD	G%	Pts
1	Melbourne Vixens	13	9	4	746	592	+154	126.0	18
2	Queensland Firebirds	13	9	4	694	623	+71	111.4	18
3	New South Wales Swifts	13	9	4	707	652	+55	108.4	18
4	Waikato Bay of Plenty Magic	13	8	5	727	672	+55	108.2	16
5	Southern Steel	13	7	6	792	809	−17	97.9	14
6	Central Pulse	13	7	6	658	675	−17	97.5	14
7	Northern Mystics	13	6	7	706	752	−46	93.9	12
8	Adelaide Thunderbirds	13	5	8	663	706	−43	93.9	10
9	West Coast Fever	13	4	9	689	724	−35	95.2	8
10	Mainland Tactix	13	1	12	694	871	−177	79.7	2
Updated 2 May 2021

Qualified for Major semi-final
Qualified for Minor semi-final

- Pld = Games played
- W = Win (2 points)
- L = Loss (0 points)
- GF = Goals For
- GA = Goals Against
- GD = Goals Difference (= GF−GA)
- G% = Goal percentage (= 100 × GF/GA)

Pts = Points

== Finals ==
Semifinals
9 June – John Cain Arena
Melbourne Vixens	52
Queensland Firebirds	47
8 June – Sydney SuperDome
New South Wales Swifts	49
Waikato Bay of Plenty Magic	50

Preliminary final
16 June – Brisbane Convention & Exhibition Centre
Queensland Firebirds	54
Waikato Bay of Plenty Magic	50

Grand final
22 June – John Cain Arena
Melbourne Vixens	53
Queensland Firebirds	42

=== Major semi-final ===
Monday 9 June; 5:48pm	Stats	Melbourne Vixens	52–47	Queensland Firebirds	Hisense Arena	Fox Sports; Sky Sport
Monday 9 June; 5:48pm	Stats	Scoring by quarter: 16–11, 11-13, 14–13, 11–12			Hisense Arena	Fox Sports; Sky Sport
Monday 9 June; 5:48pm	Stats	Tegan Caldwell 27/36 (75%); Karyn Bailey 25/29 (86%)		Romelda Aiken 35/41 (85%); Amy Wild 12/15 (80%)	Hisense Arena	Fox Sports; Sky Sport

=== Preliminary final ===
Monday 16 June; 7:18pm	Stats	Queensland Firebirds	54–50	Waikato Bay of Plenty Magic	Brisbane Convention and Exhibition Centre; Attendance: 3,200	Fox Sports; Sky Sport
Monday 16 June; 7:18pm	Stats	Scoring by quarter: 14–13, 15–13, 11–11, 14–13			Brisbane Convention and Exhibition Centre; Attendance: 3,200	Fox Sports; Sky Sport
Monday 16 June; 7:18pm	Stats	Romelda Aiken 36/44 (82%); Amy Wild 18/21 (86%)		Joanne Harten 29/38 (76%); Ellen Halpenny 21/24 (88%)	Brisbane Convention and Exhibition Centre; Attendance: 3,200	Fox Sports; Sky Sport

=== Grand final ===
Sunday 22 June; 2:28pm	Stats	Melbourne Vixens	53–42	Queensland Firebirds	Hisense Arena; Attendance: 9,345	Fox Sports; Sky Sport
Sunday 22 June; 2:28pm	Stats	Scoring by quarter: 13–11, 11–11, 13–12, 16–8			Hisense Arena; Attendance: 9,345	Fox Sports; Sky Sport
Sunday 22 June; 2:28pm	Stats	Tegan Caldwell 30/33 (91%); Karyn Bailey 17/22 (77%); Catherine Cox 6/7 (86%)		Romelda Aiken 25/30 (83%); Amy Wild 17/21 (81%)	Hisense Arena; Attendance: 9,345	Fox Sports; Sky Sport

== Award winners ==
=== Mission Queensland Firebirds Awards ===
Award	Winner
Mission Foods Player of the Year	(Jamaica) Romelda Aiken ^{(Note 1)}
Mission Foods Player of the Year	(Australia) Laura Geitz ^{(Note 1)}
Firebirds Players' Player	(Australia) Laura Geitz
Firebirds Spirit Award	(Australia) Verity Simmons
Firebirds Members Award	(Australia) Gabi Simpson

Notes

- ^1 Romelda Aiken and Laura Geitz shared the award.

=== Australian Netball Awards ===
Award	Winner
Australian ANZ Championship Player of the Year	Laura Geitz
Joyce Brown Coach of the Year	Roselee Jencke
