= 2018 BWF International Series =

The 2018 BWF International Series was the twelfth season of the BWF International Series.

== Schedule ==
Below is the schedule released by Badminton World Federation:

Tour	Official title	Venue	City	Date		Prize money USD	Prospectus	Report
Tour	Official title	Venue	City	Start	Finish	Prize money USD	Prospectus	Report
1	(Estonia) YONEX Estonian International 2018	TTÜ Sports Hall	Tallinn	January 11	January 14	10,000		Report
2	(Sweden) Swedish Open 2018	Sparbanken Skåne Arena	Lund	January 18	January 21	10,000		Report
3	Iceland International 2018	TBR – Badminton Hall	Reykjavík	January 25	January 28	10,000		Report
4	Uganda International 2018	Lugogo Indoor Stadium	Kampala	February 22	February 25	10,000		Report
5	IV Jamaica International 2018	National Indoor Sport Centre	Kingston	February 27	March 4	10,000		Report
6	(Portugal) 53 Portuguese International Championships	High Performance Center for Badminton	Caldas da Rainha	March 8	March 11	10,000		Report
7	(Czech Republic) KaBaL International Karviná 2018	STaRS Karviná, s.r.o.	Karviná	March 15	March 18	10,000		Report
8	USM LI NING Indonesia International Series 2018	Gelora Universitas	Semarang	April 10	April 15	10,000		Report
9	(Netherlands) 19th VICTOR Dutch International 2018	VELO Hall	Wateringen	April 12	April 15	10,000		Report
10	FZ Forza Slovenia International 2018	Sport Hall Medvode	Medvode	May 10	May 13	10,000		Report
11	Cameroon International 2018	Yaoundé Multipurpose Sports Complex	Yaoundé	June 14	June 17	10,000		Report
12	(Ivory Coast) Côte d'Ivoire International 2018	Palais des Sports de Treichville	Abidjan	June 21	June 24	10,000		Report
13	(Peru) Perú International 2018	Villa Deportiva Nacional	Lima	June 28	July 1	10,000		Report
14	Mongolia International Series 2018	ALDAR Sport Complex	Ulaanbaatar	June 28	July 1	10,000		Report
15	Ghana International 2018	GPHA Sports Hall	Accra	July 12	July 15	10,000		Report
16	(United States) 2018 YONEX/K&D Graphics International Series	Orange County Badminton Club	Orange County	August 7	August 11	10,000		Report
17	(Bulgaria) Eurasia Bulgarian Open Championship, 2018	Badminton Hall EUROPE	Sofia	August 13	August 16	10,000		Report
~~18~~	~~(Chile) Santiago 2018~~	~~TBC~~	~~Santiago~~	~~September 4~~	~~September 9~~	~~8,000~~		~~Report~~
~~19~~	~~(New Zealand) TUI MEDICAL Waikato International 2018~~	~~TBC~~	~~Hamilton~~	~~September 13~~	~~September 16~~	~~TBC~~		~~Report~~
20	(Australia) Sydney International 2018	Netball Central	Sydney	September 19	September 23	10,000		Report
21	(Poland) Polish International 2018	TBC	Bieruń	September 20	September 23	10,000		Report
22	(Mexico) IX International Mexicano 2018	Gimnasio Olímpico de Ciudad Deportiva	Aguascalientes	September 20	September 23	8,000		Report
23	(Guatemala) V International Series Mayor 2018	Gimnasio Teodoro Palacios Flores	Guatemala City	September 25	September 30	10,000		Report
~~24~~	~~(Brazil) 5th Mercosul International Series 2018~~	~~Sociedade Hípica de Campinas~~	~~Campinas~~	~~October 10~~	~~October 21~~	~~10,000~~		~~Report~~
25	Singapore International Series 2018	TBC	Singapore	October 16	October 21	10,000		Report
26	(Greece) Hellas Open 2018	TBC	Chania	October 18	October 21	10,000		Report
27	(Dominican Republic) IX Santo Domingo Open 2018	Centro Olímpico Juan Pablo Duarte	Santo Domingo	October 12	October 26	10,000		Report
28	Egypt International 2018	Cairo International Stadium	Cairo	October 25	October 28	10,000		Report
29	Bahrain International Series 2018	Khalifa Sports City Stadium	Isa Town	October 31	November 4	10,000		Report
30	Malaysia International Series 2018	TBC	Penang	November 6	November 11	15,000		Report
31	(Norway) Norwegian International 2018	Jotunhallen	Sandefjord	November 8	November 11	10,000		Report
32	XXII Suriname International 2018	Ring Sports Center	Paramaribo	November 13	November 18	10,000		Report
33	(Republic of Ireland) FZ FORZA Irish Open 2018	National Sports Campus	Dublin	November 14	November 18	10,000		Report
34	Condensate Apacs Kazakhstan International Series 2018	Multipurpose Sporhall	Uralsk	November 22	November 25	10,000		Report
35	(Wales) YONEX Welsh International 2018	Sport Wales National Centre	Cardiff	November 28	December 1	10,000		Report
36	YONEX SUNRISE Nepal International Series 2018	National Sports Council	Tripureshwar	December 4	December 8	10,000		Report
37	Turkey International 2018	Turkey Olumpic Center	Ankara	December 17	December 20	10,000		Report

== Results ==
=== Winners ===
Tour	Men's singles	Women's singles	Men's doubles	Women's doubles	Mixed doubles
Estonia	(France) Lucas Claerbout	(Israel) Ksenia Polikarpova	(Russia) Andrey Parakhodin (Russia) Nikolai Ukk	(Russia) Ekaterina Bolotova (Russia) Alina Davletova	(Germany) Peter Käsbauer (Germany) Olga Konon
Sweden	(India) Siddharth Pratap Singh	(Denmark) Michelle Skødstrup	(New Zealand) Oliver Leydon-Davis (Denmark) Lasse Mølhede	(Sweden) Emma Karlsson (Sweden) Johanna Magnusson	(France) Thom Gicquel (France) Delphine Delrue
Iceland	(England) Sam Parsons	(India) Saili Rane	(Scotland) Alexander Dunn (Scotland) Adam Hall	(Scotland) Julie MacPherson (Scotland) Eleanor O'Donnell	(India) Rohan Kapoor (India) Kuhoo Garg
Uganda	(France) Pierrick Cajot	(Mauritius) Kate Foo Kune	(Kazakhstan) Artur Niyazov (Kazakhstan) Dmitriy Panarin	(Egypt) Doha Hany (Egypt) Hadia Hosny	(Germany) Jonathan Persson (Mauritius) Kate Foo Kune
Jamaica	(Canada) Jason Ho-Shue	(United States) Jamie Hsu	(India) Tarun Kona (India) Saurabh Sharma	(United States) Jamie Hsu (United States) Jamie Subandhi	(Cuba) Osleni Guerrero (Cuba) Yeily Ortiz
Portugal	(Denmark) Rasmus Messerschmidt	(China) Qi Xuefei	(Chinese Taipei) Lu Chen (Chinese Taipei) Ye Hong-wei	(Chinese Taipei) Li Zi-qing (Chinese Taipei) Teng Chun-hsun	(Germany) Peter Käsbauer (Germany) Olga Konon
Czech Republic	(Denmark) Victor Svendsen	(Japan) Yuri Nakamura	(Germany) Bjarne Geiss (Germany) Jan Colin Völker	(Thailand) Supissara Paewsampran (Thailand) Puttita Supajirakul	(Germany) Peter Käsbauer (Germany) Olga Konon
Indonesia	(Indonesia) Shesar Hiren Rhustavito	(Indonesia) Aurum Oktavia Winata	(Indonesia) Rian Swastedian (Indonesia) Amri Syahnawi	(Indonesia) Shela Devia Aulia (Indonesia) Pia Zebadiah Bernadet	(Indonesia) Amri Syahnawi (Indonesia) Shela Devi Aulia
Netherlands	(Malaysia) Cheam June Wei	(Denmark) Julie Dawall Jakobsen	(India) Arun George (India) Sanyam Shukla	(Chinese Taipei) Chang Ya-lan (Chinese Taipei) Cheng Wen-hsing	(France) Thom Gicquel (France) Delphine Delrue
Slovenia	(England) Toby Penty	(China) Qi Xuefei	(Denmark) Jeppe Bay (Denmark) Rasmus Kjær	(Turkey) Bengisu Erçetin (Turkey) Nazlıcan İnci	(England) Gregory Mairs (England) Jenny Moore
Cameroon	(Mexico) Luis Ramón Garrido	(Egypt) Hadia Hosny	(Denmark) Mathias Pedersen (Germany) Jonathan Persson	(Egypt) Doha Hany (Egypt) Hadia Hosny	(Egypt) Adham Hatem Elgamal (Egypt) Doha Hany
Cote d'Ivoire	(Mexico) Luis Ramón Garrido	(Nigeria) Dorcas Ajoke Adesokan	(Nigeria) Godwin Olofua (Nigeria) Anuoluwapo Juwon Opeyori	(Zambia) Evelyn Siamupangila (Zambia) Ogar Siamupangila	(Nigeria) Clement Krobakpo (Nigeria) Dorcas Ajoke Adesokan
Peru	(Guatemala) Kevin Cordón	(United States) Crystal Pan	(United States) Enrico Asuncion (Philippines) Carlo Glenn Remo	(Peru) Daniela Macías (Peru) Dánica Nishimura	(Brazil) Artur Silva Pomoceno (Brazil) Fabiana Silva
Mongolia	(Singapore) Loh Kean Yew	(Hong Kong) Deng Xuan	(Singapore) Lee Jian Liang (Singapore) Jason Wong	(Singapore) Citra Putri Sari Dewi (Singapore) Jin Yujia	(Singapore) Bimo Adi Prakoso (Singapore) Jin Yujia
Ghana	(India) Harsheel Dani	(Israel) Ksenia Polikarpova	(India) Vasantha Kumar Hanumaiah Raganatha (India) Ashith Surya	(India) Harika Veludurthi (India) Karishma Wadkar	(India) Vighnesh Devlekar (India) Harika Veludurthi
United States	(Canada) B. R. Sankeerth	(Japan) Saya Yamamoto	(Canada) Joshua Hurlburt-Yu (Canada) Duncan Yao	(Japan) Akane Araki (Japan) Riko Imai	(Canada) Joshua Hurlburt-Yu (Canada) Josephine Wu
Bulgaria	(France) Toma Junior Popov	(Turkey) Neslihan Yiğit	(France) Christo Popov (France) Toma Junior Popov	(Bulgaria) Gabriela Stoeva (Bulgaria) Stefani Stoeva	(Bulgaria) Alex Vlaar (Bulgaria) Mariya Mitsova
Chile	Cancelled				
Waikato	Cancelled				
Sydney	(Japan) Riichi Takeshita	(Japan) Ayumi Mine	(Japan) Hiroki Okamura (Japan) Masayuki Onodera	(Chinese Taipei) Lee Chih-chen (Chinese Taipei) Liu Chiao-yun	(Japan) Tadayuki Urai (Japan) Rena Miyaura
Poland	(Germany) Kai Schäfer	(India) Rituparna Das	(Chinese Taipei) Lin Shang-kai (Chinese Taipei) Tseng Min-hao	(Japan) Mamiko Ishibashi (Japan) Mirai Shinoda	(Czech Republic) Jakub Bitman (Czech Republic) Alžběta Bášová
Mexico	(Guatemala) Kevin Cordón	(Cuba) Taymara Oropesa	(Brazil) Fabrício Farias (Brazil) Francielton Farias	(Brazil) Lohaynny Vicente (Brazil) Luana Vicente	(India) Venkat Gaurav Prasad (India) Juhi Dewangan
Guatemala	(Guatemala) Kevin Cordón	(Canada) Talia Ng	(Guatemala) Ruben Castellanos (Guatemala) Aníbal Marroquín	(Canada) Talia Ng (Canada) Josephine Wu	(Canada) Joshua Hurlburt-Yu (Canada) Josephine Wu
Brazil	Cancelled				
Singapore	(Indonesia) Krishna Adi Nugraha	(Indonesia) Choirunnisa	(Hong Kong) Yonny Chung (Hong Kong) Tam Chun Hei	(Hong Kong) Ng Tsz Yau (Hong Kong) Yuen Sin Ying	(Hong Kong) Yeung Ming Nok (Hong Kong) Ng Tsz Yau
Greece	(Poland) Adrian Dziółko	(Germany) Luise Heim	(India) Arjun M. R. (India) Shlok Ramchandran	(India) Rutaparna Panda (India) Arathi Sara Sunil	(India) Arjun M. R. (India) Maneesha Kukkapalli
Santo Domingo	(Cuba) Osleni Guerrero	(Brazil) Fabiana Silva	(Canada) Joshua Hurlburt-Yu (Canada) Duncan Yao	(Brazil) Lohaynny Vicente (Brazil) Luana Vicente	(Canada) Joshua Hurlburt-Yu (Canada) Josephine Wu
Egypt	(Azerbaijan) Ade Resky Dwicahyo	(Myanmar) Thet Htar Thuzar	(Azerbaijan) Ade Resky Dwicahyo (Azerbaijan) Azmy Qowimuramadhoni	(India) Pooja Dandu (India) Sanjana Santosh	(Switzerland) Oliver Schaller (Switzerland) Céline Burkart
Bahrain	(Azerbaijan) Ade Resky Dwicahyo	(Indonesia) Sri Fatmawati	(Azerbaijan) Ade Resky Dwicahyo (Azerbaijan) Azmy Qowimuramadhoni	(Bahrain) Rachel Jacob Cherickal (Bahrain) Jasmine Joy Bacani	(Jordan) Bahaedeen Ahmad Alshannik (Jordan) Domou Amro
Malaysia	(Indonesia) Gatjra Piliang Cupu	(Malaysia) Kisona Selvaduray	(South Korea) Ko Sung-hyun (South Korea) Shin Baek-cheol	(Malaysia) Lim Peiy Yee (Malaysia) Thinaah Muralitharan	(Indonesia) Andika Ramadiansyah (Indonesia) Bunga Fitriani Romadhini
Norway	(Denmark) Rasmus Messerschmidt	(South Korea) Sim Yu-jin	(South Korea) Choi Sol-gyu (South Korea) Seo Seung-jae	(Denmark) Gabriella Bøje (Denmark) Marie Louise Steffensen	(Denmark) Joel Eipe (Denmark) Mette Poulsen
Suriname	(Guatemala) Kevin Cordón	(Belgium) Lianne Tan	(Jamaica) Dennis Coke (Jamaica) Anthony McNee	(Peru) Daniela Macías (Peru) Dánica Nishimura	(Dominican Republic) Cesar Brito (Dominican Republic) Bermary Polanco
Ireland	(France) Léo Rossi	(South Korea) An Se-young	(South Korea) Choi Sol-gyu (South Korea) Seo Seung-jae	(England) Emily Westwood (Malaysia) Yang Li Lian	(Republic of Ireland) Sam Magee (Republic of Ireland) Chloe Magee
Kazakhstan	(Kazakhstan) Dmitriy Panarin	(Russia) Anastasia Redkina	(Kazakhstan) Artur Niyazov (Kazakhstan) Dmitriy Panarin	(Russia) Ekaterina Kadochnikova (Russia) Anastasia Redkina	(Russia) Rodion Kargaev (Russia) Viktoriia Vorobeva
Wales	(Spain) Luís Enrique Peñalver	(Spain) Clara Azurmendi	(England) Max Flynn (England) Callum Hemming	(Scotland) Julie MacPherson (Scotland) Holly Newall	(England) Matthew Clare (England) Victoria Williams
Nepal	(Thailand) Kunlavut Vitidsarn	(Thailand) Chananchida Jucharoen	(Thailand) Supak Jomkoh (Thailand) Wachirawit Sothon	(India) Aparna Balan (India) Sruthi K.P.	(Thailand) Supak Jomkoh (Thailand) Supissara Paewsampran
Turkey	(Indonesia) Ikhsan Rumbay	(Turkey) Özge Bayrak	(Indonesia) Leo Rolly Carnando (Indonesia) Daniel Marthin	(Indonesia) Nita Violina Marwah (Indonesia) Putri Syaikah	(Singapore) Danny Bawa Chrisnanta (Singapore) Tan Wei Han

=== Performance by nation ===
Rank	Nation	EST	SWE	ISL	UGA	JAM	POR	CZE	INA	NED	SLO	CMR	CIV	PER	MGL	GHA	USA	BUL	CHI	NZL	AUS	POL	MEX	GUA	BRA	SGP	GRE	DOM	EGY	BRN	MAS	NOR	SUR	IRL	KAZ	WAL	NEP	TUR	Total
1	India		1	2		1				1						4			—N/a	—N/a		1	1		—N/a		3		1								1		16
2	Indonesia								5										—N/a	—N/a					—N/a	2				1	2							3	13
3	Canada					1											3		—N/a	—N/a				3	—N/a			2											9
3	Denmark		1.5				1	1		1	1	0.5							—N/a	—N/a					—N/a							3							9
5	Japan							1									2		—N/a	—N/a	4	1			—N/a														8
6	France	1	1		1					1								2	—N/a	—N/a					—N/a									1					7
6	Germany	1			0.5		1	2				0.5							—N/a	—N/a		1			—N/a		1												7
8	England			1							2								—N/a	—N/a					—N/a									0.5		2			5.5
9	Brazil													1					—N/a	—N/a			2		—N/a			2											5
9	Chinese Taipei						2			1									—N/a	—N/a	1	1			—N/a														5
9	Guatemala													1					—N/a	—N/a			1	2	—N/a								1						5
9	Russia	2																	—N/a	—N/a					—N/a										3				5
9	Singapore														4				—N/a	—N/a					—N/a													1	5
9	South Korea																		—N/a	—N/a					—N/a						1	2		2					5
9	Thailand							1											—N/a	—N/a					—N/a												4		5
16	Azerbaijan																		—N/a	—N/a					—N/a				2	2									4
16	Egypt				1							3							—N/a	—N/a					—N/a														4
16	Hong Kong														1				—N/a	—N/a					—N/a	3													4
19	Malaysia									1									—N/a	—N/a					—N/a						2			0.5					3.5
19	United States					2								1.5					—N/a	—N/a					—N/a														3.5
21	Cuba					1													—N/a	—N/a			1		—N/a			1											3
21	Kazakhstan				1														—N/a	—N/a					—N/a										2				3
21	Nigeria												3						—N/a	—N/a					—N/a														3
21	Scotland			2															—N/a	—N/a					—N/a											1			3
21	Turkey										1							1	—N/a	—N/a					—N/a													1	3
26	Bulgaria																	2	—N/a	—N/a					—N/a														2
26	China						1				1								—N/a	—N/a					—N/a														2
26	Israel	1														1			—N/a	—N/a					—N/a														2
26	Mexico											1	1						—N/a	—N/a					—N/a														2
26	Peru													1					—N/a	—N/a					—N/a								1						2
26	Spain																		—N/a	—N/a					—N/a											2			2
32	Mauritius				1.5														—N/a	—N/a					—N/a														1.5
33	Bahrain																		—N/a	—N/a					—N/a					1									1
33	Belgium																		—N/a	—N/a					—N/a								1						1
33	Czech Republic																		—N/a	—N/a		1			—N/a														1
33	Dominican Republic																		—N/a	—N/a					—N/a								1						1
33	Ireland																		—N/a	—N/a					—N/a									1					1
33	Jamaica																		—N/a	—N/a					—N/a								1						1
33	Jordan																		—N/a	—N/a					—N/a					1									1
33	Myanmar																		—N/a	—N/a					—N/a				1										1
33	Poland																		—N/a	—N/a					—N/a		1												1
33	Sweden		1																—N/a	—N/a					—N/a														1
33	Switzerland																		—N/a	—N/a					—N/a				1										1
33	Zambia												1						—N/a	—N/a					—N/a														1
45	New Zealand		0.5																—N/a	—N/a					—N/a														0.5
45	Philippines													0.5					—N/a	—N/a					—N/a														0.5

=== Players with multiple titles ===
In alphabetical order.

Rank	Player	MS	WS	MD	WD	XD	Total
1	(Canada) Joshua Hurlburt-Yu			2		3	5
2	(Guatemala) Kevin Cordon	4					4
2	(Azerbaijan) Ade Resky Dwicahyo	2		2			4
2	(Canada) Josephine Wu				1	3	4
5	(Egypt) Doha Hany				2	1	3
5	(Egypt) Hadia Hosny		1		2		3
5	(Kazakhstan) Dmitry Panarin	1		2			3
