= Tayyab Madni =

Australian producer, writer, and director

- Born: Tayyab Rizwan Madni; Sydney, Australia
- Education: Western Sydney University
- Occupations: producer, writer, director
- Website: https://www.pwaustralia.com.au/

Tayyab Madni is an Australian Muslim producer, writer, and director. He is best known for working as a producer for several films including, The Man Who Knew Infinity (2016) and Hotel Mumbai (2018). Sahela (2024) and Place to Be (Film) (2025)

== Early life and education ==
Madni was born in Sydney, Australia. He was educated at St Paul's Grammar School and received his degree in Hospitality Management from the University of Western Sydney in 1997.

== Career ==
Madni has worked as a producer in movies such as The Man Who Knew Infinity produced by Edward R. Pressman, Hotel Mumbai produced by Basil Iwanyk, Yaman, and Aussie Who Baffled The World. In 2017, he founded a production house company, Picture Works Australia. He is also an executive member of the International Show Biz Expo (ISBE). In 2022, he won Berlin International Art Film Festival's Best Indie Short Film for Sayonee, a 2021 short film.

== Awards and recognition ==
- Best Indie short film – 8th Berlin Art Film Festival.
- Best Feature Film Director – 8th Berlin Art Film Festival.
