= 2016 BWF International Series =

The 2016 BWF International Series was the tenth season of the BWF International Series.

== Schedule ==
Below is the schedule released by Badminton World Federation:

Tour	Official title	Venue	City	Date		Prize money USD	Report
Tour	Official title	Venue	City	Start	Finish	Prize money USD	Report
1	(Estonia) Yonex Estonian International 2016	TTÜ Sport Hall	Tallinn	January 14	January 17	6,000	
2	Iceland International 2016	TBR Hall	Reykjavík	January 28	January 31	6,000	
3	(United States) Manhattan Beach International Series 2016		Manhattan Beach	February 4	February 7	6,000	
4	Guatemala International Series 2016		Ciudad de Guatemala	February 24	February 28	6,000	
5	Uganda International 2016		Kampala	February 25	February 28	6,000	
6	II Peru International Series 2016		Lima	March 3	March 6	6,000	
7	(Portugal) 51st Portuguese International Championships		Caldas da Rainha	March 10	March 13	6,000	
8	(Romania) Romanian International 2016		Timișoara	March 17	March 20	6,000	
9	II Jamaica International 2016		Kingston	March 17	March 20	6,000	
10	(Cuba) XVII Giraldilla 2016		La Habana	March 24	March 27	6,000	
11	Chile International Series 2016		Temuco	April 19	April 23	6,000	
12	(Netherlands) Dutch International 2016		Wateringen	April 21	April 24	10,000	
13	(Greece) Victor Hellas Open 2016		Sidirokastro	May 5	May 8	6,000	
14	(Indonesia) Walikota Surabaya Victor International Series 2016		Surabaya	May 9	May 15	10,000	
15	Slovenia International 2016		Medvode	May 12	May 15	6,000	
16	Mauritius International 2016		Rose Hill	June 16	June 19	6,000	
18	(Bulgaria) Eurasia Bulgarian International Championships 2016		Sofia	August 15	August 18	6,000	
19	OUE Singapore International Series 2016		Singapore	August 30	September 3	-	
20	(Mexico) VII Internacional Mexicano 2016		Guadalajara	September 9	September 11	6,000	
21	(Australia) Li-Ning Sydney International 2016	Netball Central	Sydney	September 14	September 17	6,000	
22	(Poland) VARCOLOR Polish International 2016		Bierun	September 22	September 25	6,000	
23	VII Colombia International 2016		Neiva	September 22	September 25	6,000	
24	Kawasaki Vietnam International Series 2016		Bac Ninh	September 28	October 2	6,000	
25	Ethiopia International 2016		Addis Ababa	September 30	October 2	6,000	
26	Yonex- Sunrise Pakistan International Series 2016		Islamabad	October 18	October 21	6,000	
27	(Switzerland) Swiss International 2016		Yverdon-les-Bains	October 20	October 23	6,000	
28	Egypt International 2016		Cairo	October 20	October 23	6,000	
29	(Dominican Republic) Sto. Domingo Open 2016		Santo Domingo	October 25	October 29	6,000	
31	Suriname International 2016		Paramaribo	November 16	November 19	6,000	
32	(Norway) Norwegian International 2016		Sandefjord	November 17	November 20	6,000	
33	India International Series 2016		Hyderabad	November 22	November 27	6,000	
34	(Finland) Finnish International 2016		Helsinki	November 24	November 27	6,000	
35	Zambia International 2016		Lusaka	November 24	November 27	6,000	
36	South Africa International 2016		Benoni	December 2	December 4	6,000	
37	Botswana International Series 2016		Gaborone	December 8	December 11	6,000	
38	Nepal International Series 2016		Kathmandu	December 13	December 17	6,000	
39	I.B.B. Turkey International 2016		Istanbul	December 19	December 22	6,000	

== Tournaments Cancel ==
Tour	Official title	Venue	City	Date		Prize money USD	Report
Tour	Official title	Venue	City	Start	Finish	Prize money USD	Report
17	Kenya International 2016						
30	Morocco International 2016						

== Results ==
=== Winners ===
Tour	Men's singles	Women's singles	Men's doubles	Women's doubles	Mixed doubles
Estonia	(Finland) Ville Lång	(Belgium) Lianne Tan	(Germany) Jones Ralfy Jansen (Germany) Josche Zurwonne	(Russia) Anastasia Chervyakova (Russia) Olga Morozova	(Russia) Alexandr Zinchenko (Russia) Olga Morozova
Iceland	(Denmark) Kim Bruun	(Denmark) Julie Dawal Jakobsen	(England) Christopher Coles (Scotland) Adam Hall	(England) Jessica Pugh (England) Sarah Walker	(Finland) Anton Kaisti (Netherlands) Cheryl Seinen
United States	(Italy) Indra Bagus Ade Chandra	(Italy) Jeanine Cicognini	(Indonesia) David Yedija Pohan (Indonesia) Ricky Alverino Sidarta	(Mexico) Nicole Marquez (Mexico) Adelina Quiñones	(Indonesia) David Yedija Pohan (Indonesia) Jenna Gozali
Guatemala	(Cuba) Osleni Guerrero	(Brazil) Lohaynny Vicente	(India) Alwin Francis (India) Kona Tarun	(Guatemala) Mariana Paiz (Guatemala) Nikté Sotomayor	(Guatemala) Jonathan Solís (Guatemala) Nikté Sotomayor
Uganda	(Sri Lanka) Niluka Karunaratne	(Portugal) Telma Santos	(Sri Lanka) Dinuka Karunaratna (Sri Lanka) Niluka Karunaratne	(Turkey) Cemre Fere (Turkey) Ebru Yazgan	(Egypt) Abdelrahman Kashkal (Egypt) Hadia Hosny
Peru	(Japan) Yusuke Onodera	(Finland) Airi Mikkelä	(India) Alwin Francis (India) Kona Tarun	(Japan) Chisato Hoshi (Japan) Naru Shinoya	(Peru) Mario Cuba (Peru) Katherine Winder
Portugal	(Sri Lanka) Niluka Karunaratne	(Denmark) Mia Blichfeldt	(Malaysia) Ong Yew Sin (Malaysia) Teo Ee Yi	(Malaysia) Goh Yea Ching (Malaysia) Peck Yen Wei	(Denmark) Mikkel Mikkelsen (Denmark) Mai Surrow
(Romania) Romanian	(Thailand) Pannawit Thongnuam	(Malaysia) Lee Ying Ying	(Malaysia) Ong Yew Sin (Malaysia) Teo Ee Yi	(England) Jessica Pugh (Netherlands) Cheryl Seinen	(Malaysia) Wong Fai Yin (Malaysia) Shevon Jemie Lai
Jamaica	(Portugal) Pedro Martins	(Italy) Jeanine Cicognini	(Belgium) Matijs Dierickx (Belgium) Freek Golinski	(Jamaica) Ruth Williams (Jamaica) Katherine Wynter	(Austria) David Obernosterer (Austria) Elisabeth Baldauf
Cuba	(Denmark) Kim Bruun	(Germany) Fabienne Deprez	(Poland) Miłosz Bochat (Poland) Paweł Pietryja	(Finland) Jenny Nyström (Finland) Sonja Pekkola	(Poland) Paweł Pietryja (Poland) Aneta Wojtkowska
Chile	(Cuba) Osleni Guerrero	(Turkey) Özge Bayrak	(Chile) Diego Castillo (Chile) Alonso Medel	no competition	(Chile) Iván León (Chile) Camila Macaya
Netherlands	(Spain) Pablo Abián	(Germany) Yvonne Li	(Denmark) Alexander Bond (Denmark) Joel Eipe	(England) Chloe Birch (England) Sophie Brown	(Denmark) Alexander Bond (Denmark) Ditte Søby Hansen
Greece	(Denmark) Kim Bruun	(Germany) Fabienne Deprez	(Poland) Miłosz Bochat (Poland) Paweł Pietryja	(Finland) Jenny Nyström (Finland) Sonja Pekkola	(Poland) Paweł Pietryja (Poland) Aneta Wojtkowska
Indonesia	(Malaysia) Goh Giap Chin	(Japan) Moe Araki	(Indonesia) Fajar Alfian (Indonesia) Muhammad Rian Ardianto	(Indonesia) Apriani Rahayu (Indonesia) Jauza Fadhila Sugiarto	(Indonesia) Agripinna Putra (Indonesia) Apriani Rahayu
Slovenia	(Scotland) Kieran Merrilees	(Denmark) Julie Dawal Jakobsen	(Republic of Ireland) Joshua Magee (Republic of Ireland) Sam Magee	(England) Chloe Birch (England) Sarah Walker	(Denmark) Mikkel Mikkelsen (Denmark) Mai Surrow
Mauritius	(India) Rahul Yadav Chittaboina	(India) Saili Rane	(India) Satwiksairaj Rankireddy (India) Chirag Shetty	(Malaysia) Lee Zhi Qing (India) Prajakta Sawant	(India) Satwiksairaj Rankireddy (India) K. Maneesha
Bulgaria	(Denmark) Patrick Bjerregaard	(Spain) Clara Azurmendi	(Thailand) Pakin Kuna-anuvit (Thailand) Natthapat Trinkajee	(Turkey) Cemre Fere (Turkey) Neslihan Kılıç	(Russia) Rodion Alimov (Russia) Alina Davletova
Singapore	(Malaysia) Satheishtharan Ramachandran	(Indonesia) Asty Dwi Widyaningrum	(Malaysia) Goh Sze Fei (Malaysia) Nur Izzuddin	(Indonesia) Suci Rizky Andini (Indonesia) Yulfira Barkah	(Indonesia) Yantoni Edy Saputra (Indonesia) Marsheilla Gischa Islami
Mexico	(Austria) Vilson Vattanirappel	(Mexico) Haramara Gaitan	(Mexico) Jesús Barajas (Mexico) Luis Montoya	(Mexico) Cynthia González (Mexico) Mariana Ugalde	(Austria) Vilson Vattanirappel (Mexico) Cynthia González
Australia	(Chinese Taipei) Lu Chia-hung	(Japan) Shiori Saito	(Chinese Taipei) Lee Fang-chih (Chinese Taipei) Lee Fang-jen	(Japan) Yuho Imai (Japan) Haruka Yonemoto	(Chinese Taipei) Yang Ming-tse (Chinese Taipei) Lee Chia-hsin
Poland	(India) Sourabh Varma	(India) Rituparna Das	(England) Christopher Coles (England) Gregory Mairs	(India) Sanjana Santosh (India) Arathi Sara Sunil	(Poland) Paweł Pietryja (Poland) Aneta Wojtkowska
(Colombia) Columbia	(Guatemala) Rubén Castellanos	(Guatemala) Nikté Sotomayor	(Guatemala) Rubén Castellanos (Guatemala) Aníbal Marroquín	(Colombia) Ángela Ordóñez (Colombia) Magly Villamizar Ordoñez	(Guatemala) Jonathan Solís (Guatemala) Nikté Sotomayor
Vietnam	(Vietnam) Nguyễn Tiến Minh	(Chinese Taipei) Chen Su-yu	(Vietnam) Đỗ Tuấn Đức (Vietnam) Phạm Hồng Nam	(Vietnam) Nguyễn Thị Sen (Vietnam) Vũ Thị Trang	(Indonesia) Rinov Rivaldy (Indonesia) Vania Arianti Sukoco
Ethiopia	(Italy) Rosario Maddaloni	(Egypt) Menna El-Tanany	(Italy) Matteo Bellucci (Italy) Fabio Caponio	(Italy) Silvia Garino (Italy) Lisa Iversen	(Egypt) Ahmed Salah (Egypt) Menna El-Tanany
Pakistan	(Pakistan) Rizwan Azam	(Pakistan) Palwasha Bashir	(Pakistan) Rizwan Azam (Pakistan) Sulehri Kashif Ali	(Pakistan) Palwasha Bashir (Pakistan) Saima Manzoor	(Nepal) Ratnajit Tamang (Nepal) Nangsal Tamang
(Switzerland) Swiss	(England) Sam Parsons	(Switzerland) Sabrina Jaquet	(Malaysia) Goh Sze Fei (Malaysia) Nur Izzuddin	(Netherlands) Cheryl Seinen (Netherlands) Iris Tabeling	(Switzerland) Oliver Schaller (Switzerland) Céline Burkart
Egypt	(Czech Republic) Milan Ludík	(Lithuania) Gerda Voitechovskaja	(France) Vanmael Heriau (France) Florent Riancho	(Belarus) Kristina Silich (Lithuania) Gerda Voitechovskaja	(Egypt) Ahmed Salah (Egypt) Menna El-Tanany
Dominican Republic	(Italy) Matteo Bellucci	(Dominican Republic) Nairoby Abigail Jiménez	(Dominican Republic) William Cabrera (Dominican Republic) Nelson Javier	(Dominican Republic) Nairoby Abigail Jiménez (Dominican Republic) Bermary Polanco	(Dominican Republic) William Cabrera (Dominican Republic) Licelott Sánchez
Suriname	(Israel) Misha Zilberman	(Trinidad and Tobago) Solángel Guzmán	(Barbados) Cory Fanus (Barbados) Dakeil Thorpe	(Trinidad and Tobago) Solángel Guzmán (Trinidad and Tobago) Jada Renales	(Israel) Misha Zilberman (Israel) Svetlana Zilberman
Norway	(Finland) Kalle Koljonen	(Malaysia) Yap Rui Chen	(New Zealand) Oliver Leydon-Davis (Denmark) Lasse Moelhede	(Denmark) Julie Finne-Ipsen (Denmark) Rikke Søby	(Finland) Anton Kaisti (Finland) Jenny Nyström
India	(India) Lakshya Sen	(India) Rituparna Das	(India) Satwiksairaj Rankireddy (India) Chirag Shetty	(Malaysia) Goh Yea Ching (Malaysia) Lim Chiew Sien	(India) Satwiksairaj Rankireddy (India) K. Maneesha
Finland	(Denmark) Victor Svendsen	(Denmark) Irina Amalie Andersen	(Denmark) Jeppe Bay (Denmark) Rasmus Kjær	(Denmark) Irina Amalie Andersen (Denmark) Julie Dawall Jakobsen	(Finland) Anton Kaisti (Finland) Jenny Nyström
Zambia	(Belgium) Maxime Moreels	(Egypt) Menna El-Tanany	(Mauritius) Aatish Lubah (Mauritius) Julien Paul	(Zambia) Evelyn Siamupangila (Zambia) Ogar Siamupangila	(Egypt) Ahmed Salah (Egypt) Menna El-Tanany
South Africa	(South Africa) Jacob Maliekal	(Russia) Evgeniya Kosetskaya	(Egypt) Abdelrahman Abdelhakim (Egypt) Ahmed Salah	(South Africa) Michelle Butler-Emmett (South Africa) Jennifer Fry	(Russia) Anatoliy Yartsev (Russia) Evgeniya Kosetskaya
Botswana	(Russia) Anatoliy Yartsev	(Russia) Evgeniya Kosetskaya	(India) Alwin Francis (India) Kona Tarun	(Egypt) Doha Hany (Egypt) Hadia Hosny	(Russia) Anatoliy Yartsev (Russia) Evgeniya Kosetskaya
Nepal	(India) Abhishek Yelegar	(Vietnam) Nguyễn Thùy Linh	(India) Arjun M.R. (India) Ramchandran Shlok	(India) Meghana Jakkampudi (India) Poorvisha S. Ram	(India) Saurabh Sharma (India) Anoushka Parikh
Turkey	(Denmark) Patrick Bjerregaard	(Turkey) Cemre Fere	(France) Vanmael Hériau (France) Florent Riancho	(Turkey) Özge Bayrak (Turkey) Neslihan Yiğit	(Turkey) Melih Turgut (Turkey) Fatma Nur Yavuz

=== Performance by countries ===
Tabulated below are the International Series based on countries. Only countries who have won a title are listed:

S.no	Team	EST	ISL	USA	GUA	UGA	PER	POR	ROM	JAM	CUB	CHI	NED	GRE	INA	SLO	MRI	BUL	SIN	MEX	AUS	POL	COL	VIE	ETH	PAK	SUI	EGY	DOM	SUR	NOR	IND	FIN	ZAM	RSA	NEP	TUR	Total
1	Denmark		2					2			1		3	1		2		1													1.5							13.5
2	Malaysia							2	3						1		0.5		2								1				1							10.5
3	India				1		1										4.5					3																9.5
4	Indonesia			2											3				3					1														9
5	Italy			2						1															3				1									7
6	Finland	1	0.5				1				1			1																	2							6.5
7	Guatemala				2																		4															6
8	Russia	2											1					1										1										5
8	England		1.5						0.5							1						1					1											5
8	Japan						2								1						2																	5
8	Poland										2			2								1																5
12	Mexico			1																3.5																		4.5
13	Egypt					1																			2			1										4
13	Chinese Taipei																				3			1														4
13	Pakistan																									4												4
13	Dominican Republic																												4									4
17	Germany	1									1			1																								3
17	Sri Lanka					2		1																														3
17	Turkey					1						1						1																				3
17	Vietnam																							3														3
21	Austria									1										1.5																		2.5
22	Belgium	1								1																												2
22	Netherlands		0.5						0.5																		1											2
22	Cuba				1							1																										2
22	Portugal					1				1																												2
22	Thailand								1									1																				2
22	Chile											2																										2
22	Spain												1					1																				2
22	Switzerland																										2											2
30	Scotland		0.5													1																						1.5
30	Lithuania																											1.5										1.5
32	Brazil				1																																	1
32	Peru						1																															1
32	Jamaica									1																												1
32	Ireland															1																						1
32	Colombia																						1															1
32	Nepal																									1												1
32	Czech Republic																											1										1
39	Belarus																											0.5										0.5
39	New Zealand																												0.5									0.5
