= St Paul's Grammar School =

Christian private school

Location
- 52 Taylor Road, Cranebrook, Western Sydney, New South Wales; Australia; 33°41′16″S 150°43′06″E

Information
- Type: Independent co-educational early learning, primary and secondary Day school
- Motto: Latin: In Christo futurum (In Christ the future)
- Denomination: Nondenominational Christianity
- Established: 1983; 43 years ago
- Educational authority: New South Wales Department of Education
- Chairman: Brett Redman
- Principal: Ian Wake
- Years: Early learning and K–12
- Enrolment: 860
- Colours: Blue and green
- Affiliations: Independent Schools Association; Australian Heads of Independent Schools Association; HICES; Association of Australasian IB Schools
- Website: www.stpauls.nsw.edu.au

St Paul's Grammar School is an independent, non-denominational Christian, co-educational early learning, primary and secondary day school. The school was founded in 1983 in Cranebrook, an outer western suburb of Sydney, New South Wales, Australia. St Paul's Grammar School has approximately 860 students, from early learning through kindergarten to year 12.

The school is a member of the Independent Schools Association, the Australian Heads of Independent Schools Association, and HICES.

== Cocurricular ==
The primary cocurricular opportunities offered at St Paul's consist of four main academies: sport, dance, drama and music. There are further opportunities available outside of these academies, including the Duke of Edinburgh International Award, NSW Rural Fire Service Cadets programme, debating, Bible study groups, chess, coding, audio visual and service-learning trips.

== Sport academy ==
The sport academy at St Paul's offers: athletics (track and field, cross country running, basketball, cricket, futsal, netball, soccer, tennis, swimming, and touch football.

== House system ==
St Paul's Grammar School employs a school house system. St Paul’s has six houses, each distinguished with a house crest, individual colour, Bible verse, and named after a local parish. Students are sorted into houses at enrolment and stay in their assigned house for the length of their enrolment at the school.

House Name	Crest	House Colour	Bible Verse
Castlereagh	Castle	Blue	1 Timothy 4:12 (Translation used is unclear) "Young people, set an example in speech, life, love, faith and purity"
Wilberforce	Griffin (Rampant)	Green	Psalm 105:4 (NIVUK) "Look to the Lord and his strength; seek his face always."
Strathdon	Dragon (Salient)	Red	Philippians 4:13 (NKJV) "I can do all things through Christ who strengthens me."
Melville	Lion (Rampant)	Orange	Micah 6:8 (NIVUK) "And what does the Lord require of you? To act justly and to love mercy and to walk humbly with your God."
Cornwallis	Eagle (Displayed)	Yellow	Isaiah 40:31 (NIVUK) "Those who hope in the Lord will renew their strength. They will soar on wings like eagles."
Claremont	Pegasus (Rampant)	Purple	Proverbs 3:5 (Translation used is unclear) "Trust in the Lord with all your heart and not on your own judgement."

== Notable alumni ==
- Pat Cummins, Australian test cricketer and captain
- Firass Dirani, film and television actor
- Tayyab Madni, producer and director
- Matilda McDonell, Australian netball player
- Steven McRae, ballet dancer
- Fiona Scott, politician, former Member for Lindsay
