= Netball NSW Premier League =

Netball league in New South Wales

- Sport: Netball
- Founded: 2016
- Owner: Netball New South Wales
- No. of teams: 10 (2022)
- Country: Australia
- Venue: Netball Central
- Most recent champion: Manly Warringah Sapphires (2025)
- Broadcaster: CluchTV
- Sponsor: Providoor
- Level on pyramid: 3
- Website: nsw.netball.com.au/netball-nsw-premier-league

The Netball NSW Premier League is a state netball league featuring teams mainly from New South Wales. The league is organised by Netball New South Wales. The Premier League was first played for during the 2016 season. It replaced the Dooleys State League's Waratah Cup as the top level netball competition in New South Wales. On a national level, the Premier League is effectively a third-level league. NNSWPL teams compete in two divisions – the Opens and the Under-23s.

== History ==
=== Earlier state leagues ===
The Premier League replaced the Dooleys State League's Waratah Cup as the top level netball competition in New South Wales. Several of the netball associations that entered teams in the Waratah Cup successfully applied to enter franchises in the Premier League. These included the Eastwood Ryde Netball Association, the Manly Warringah Netball Association and the Sutherland Shire Netball Association who respectively formed ERNA Hawks, Manly Warringah Sapphires and Sutherland Stingrays.

=== 2016 ===
The Netball NSW Premier League was first played for during the 2016 season. The eight founding franchises were Central Coast Heart, ERNA Hawks, GWS Fury, Manly Warringah Sapphires, North Shore United, Panthers, Sutherland Stingrays and UTS St George Sparks. Sutherland Stingrays were crowned the inaugural Opens Champions after an defeating Manly Warringah Sapphires 50–49 in the grand final. Panthers were the inaugural Under-20 premiers.

=== 2017 ===
Manly Warringah Sapphires won the 2017 Opens title after defeating a UTS St George Sparks team featuring Kristina Brice and Beryl Friday, 59–56 in the grand final. A Sparks team featuring Matilda McDonell defeated Panthers 55–49 in the Under-20 grand final.

=== 2018 ===
In 2018, Amy Wild captained Central Coast Heart as they defeated ERNA Hawks 60–55 in the Open's grand final. Wild was also awarded both the Netball NSW President's Medal as the Grand Final MVP and the Nance Kenny OAM Medal as the NNSWPL Player of the Year. In the Under-20 grand final, North Shore United defeated GWS Fury 56–44.

=== 2019 ===
ERNA Hawks won the 2019 Opens title after defeating Central Coast Heart 68–44 in the grand final. The under-20 competition was now changed to an under-23 competition. GWS Fury became the first Under-23 champions after defeating Manly Warringah Sapphires 60–52 in the grand final. After the first four seasons of the NNSWPL, all the original eight franchises have being crowned champions at least once in either the Under-20s, Under-23s or Opens.

=== 2020 ===
The 2020 season saw the addition of two new franchises – The Capital Spirit and South Coast Blaze. Due to the COVID-19 pandemic, the season took place later in the year. It also featured a new condensed format. In both the Opens and Under-23 divisions, teams were split into two conferences. All teams played the other teams in their conference twice and each team in the other conference once. The top two teams from each conference then contested a two-week finals series. In the Opens division, North Shore United, coached by Rebecca Bulley, were crowned champions after a 56–44 grand final win over ERNA Hawks. In the Under-23 grand final, UTS Randwick Sparks defeated South Coast Blaze 44–32.

=== 2021 ===
With the minor rounds almost complete, the 2021 season was initially suspended and then abandoned after a public health order caused the closure of Netball Central due to the COVID-19 pandemic.

=== 2022 ===
Ahead of the 2022 season a new format was announced for both the Opens and Under-23s. There will be 14 regular rounds with all teams playing each other once in the opening nine before they split into conferences for the final five. All teams will play their respective conference opponents once between Rounds 10 and 14. The top three sides from each conference will then progress to the finals series.

== Teams ==
Team	Colours	Location	Debut season	Championships	
Team	Colours	Location	Debut season	Total	Years
ERNA Hawks		Eastwood/Ryde	2016	1	2019
GWS Fury		Greater Western Sydney	2016	0	-
Hunter Central Coast Heart		Central Coast	2016	1	2018
Manly Warringah Sapphires		Northern Beaches	2016	3	2017, 2023, 2025
North Shore United		Ku-ring-gai/Northern Sydney	2016	2	2020, 2022
Panthers Netball		Penrith/Hawkesbury/Blue Mountains	2016	0	-
IMB South Coast Blaze		South Coast	2020	0	-
South West Mounties MAGIC		South Western Sydney	2024	2	2023, 2026
Sutherland Stingrays		Sutherland Shire	2016	1	2016
UTS Randwick Sparks		East Sydney	2016	0	-

Notes

- ^1 UTS Randwick Sparks originally played as UTS St George Sparks.
- ^2 Panthers Netball are affiliated with Penrith Panthers.

== Venues ==
Since 2016, Netball Central has been the host venue for the Netball NSW Premier League.

== Media coverage ==
Between 2016 and 2020, NNSWPL matches were live streamed across Netball New South Wales's social media channels by BarTV Sports. The lead commentator was ABC Grandstand's Brittany Carter. Her co-commentators included Sonia Mkoloma. Ahead of the 2021 season, CluchTV was announced as the league's new live stream partner. Carter remained the lead commentator.

== Division 1 grand finals ==
=== Dooleys State League - Waratah Cup ===
Season	Winners	Score	Runners up	Venue
2007	Sydney Storm		Eastwood/Ryde	
2008				
2009	Manly-Warringah		Eastwood Ryde	
2010	Manly-Warringah	58–45	Sutherland Shire	Anne Clark Netball Centre
2011	Manly-Warringah	52–45	Baulkham Hills	Anne Clark Netball Centre
2012	Sutherland Shire	45–43	Eastwood Ryde	Anne Clark Netball Centre
2013	Eastwood Ryde	50–46	Sutherland-Shire	Anne Clark Netball Centre
2014	St George		Eastwood Ryde	Anne Clark Netball Centre
2015	City of Sydney/Sydney University	53–40	Eastwood Ryde	Netball Central

=== Netball NSW Premier League Opens ===
Season	Winners	Score	Runners up	Venue
2016	Sutherland Stingrays	50–49	Manly-Warringah Sapphires	Genea Netball Centre
2017	Manly-Warringah Sapphires	59–56	UTS St George Sparks	Genea Netball Centre
2018	Central Coast Heart	60–55	ERNA Hawks	Genea Netball Centre
2019	ERNA Hawks	68–44	Central Coast Heart	Netball Central
2020	North Shore United	56–44	ERNA Hawks	Netball Central
2021	^{(Note 3)}			
2022	North Shore United	62–51	Central Coast Heart	Netball Central
2023	Manly-Warringah Sapphires	47–46	ERNA Hawks	Netball Central
2024	South West Mounties MAGIC	59–52	North Shore United	Netball Central
2025	Manly-Warringah Sapphires	48–44	North Shore United	Netball Central
2026				

Notes

- ^3 The 2021 season was abandoned due to the COVID-19 pandemic in New South Wales.

== Minor premierships ==
=== Dooleys State League - Waratah Cup ===
Season	Winners
2007	Sydney Storm
2008	NSWIS
2009	Eastwood Ryde
2010	Manly-Warringah
2011	Manly-Warringah
2012	Eastwood Ryde
2013	Sutherland-Shire
2014	St George
2015	City of Sydney/Sydney University

=== Netball NSW Premier League Opens ===
Season	Winners
2016	Sutherland Stingrays
2017	UTS St George Sparks
2018	ERNA Hawks
2019	Central Coast Heart
2020	?
2021	^{(Note 3)}

== Awards ==
=== Nance Kenny OAM Medal ===
The league's MVP award is named after Nance Kenny OAM.

Season	Winner	Team
2000	Shay Barley	NSWIS
2001	Nerida Stewart	Kuring-gai
2002	Nerida Stewart	Kuring-gai
2003	Tanya Lund	Manly Warringah
2004 ^{(Note 4)}	Kelly Adamson	Penrith
2004 ^{(Note 4)}	Megan Bertenshaw	Hawkesbury
2005	Samantha May	Sydney Storm
2006 ^{(Note 4)}	Katie Walker	Manly-Warringah
2006 ^{(Note 4)}	Applee Kennengiesser	Penrith
2007	Joanne Day	Eastwood/Ryde
2008	Landell Archer	Fairfield City/Sydney University
2009	Kelly Adamson	Hunter/Central Coast United
2010	Tiffany Lincoln	Manly-Warringah
2011 ^{(Note 4)}	Kimberly Borger	St George District
2011 ^{(Note 4)}	Samantha May	Baulkham Hills
2012	Tiffany Lincoln	Hunter United
2013	Leah Shoard	Sutherland Shire
2014	Kaitlyn Bryce	St George District
2015	Kaitlyn Bryce	St George District
2016	Kristen Kessler	Central Coast Heart
2017 ^{(Note 4)}	Maddie Hay	Sutherland Stingrays
2017 ^{(Note 4)}	Maddie Taylor	Central Coast Heart
2018	Amy Wild	Central Coast Heart
2019	Maddie Taylor	Central Coast Heart
2020	Lauren Woods	Panthers
2021	Toni Anderson	Sutherland Stingrays
2022 ^{(Note 4)}	Lili Gorman-Brown	Sutherland Stingrays
2022 ^{(Note 4)}	Eliza Burton	North Shore United
2023	Monika Ótai	UTS Randwick Sparks
2024	Lauren Woods	North Shore United

Notes

- ^4 The medal was shared

=== Netball NSW President's Medal ===
Grand Final MVP

Season	Winner	Team
2012	Paula Mitchell	Sutherland Shire
2013	Jo Day	Eastwood Ryde
2016	Maddie Hay	Sutherland Stingrays
2017	Georgia Marshall	Manly-Warringah Sapphires
2018	Amy Wild	Central Coast Heart
2019	Georgia Marshall	ERNA Hawks
2020	Ash Fong	North Shore United
2022	Emily Moore	North Shore United
2023	Jemma Donoghue	Manly-Warringah Sapphires
2024	Gina Crampton	South West Mounties MAGIC
2025	Audrey Little	Manly-Warringah Sapphires

== Under-23s ==
=== Grand finals ===
Season	Winners	Score	Runners up	Venue
2016	Panthers	63–50	UTS St George Sparks	Genea Netball Centre
2017	UTS St George Sparks	55–49	Panthers	Genea Netball Centre
2018	North Shore United	56–44	GWS Fury	Genea Netball Centre
2019	GWS Fury	60–52	Manly Warringah Sapphires	Netball Central
2020	UTS Randwick Sparks	44–32	South Coast Blaze	Netball Central
2021	^{(Note 3)}			
2022	Sutherland Stingrays	59–43	South Coast Blaze	Netball Central
2023	GWS Fury	51–44	UTS Randwick Sparks	Netball Central
2024	UTS Randwick Sparks	57–49	Sutherland Stingrays	Netball Central
2025	GWS Fury	57–55	Panthers	Netball Central

Notes

- ^3 The 2021 competition was abandoned due to the COVID-19 pandemic in New South Wales.
- ^5 The Under 23s Division ran as an Under 20s competition from 2016 to 2018.

== Main sponsors ==
	Years
Samsung	2016–2017
Origin Energy	2020–
