= Netball New South Wales =

Netball governing body

- Jurisdiction: New South Wales
- Membership: 115,101
- Abbreviation: Netball NSW
- Founded: 1929
- Affiliation: Netball Australia
- Headquarters: Netball Central
- Location: 2 Olympic Boulevard; Sydney Olympic Park; New South Wales
- President: Louise Sullivan

Official website
- nsw.netball.com.au

Netball New South Wales is the governing body for netball in New South Wales. It is affiliated to Netball Australia. It is responsible for organizing and managing two elite level teams, New South Wales Swifts and Giants Netball, who compete in Suncorp Super Netball. It is also responsible for organizing and managing the Netball NSW Premier League as well as numerous other leagues and competitions for junior and youth teams. Its headquarters are based at Netball Central, Sydney Olympic Park.

== History ==
Netball New South Wales was formed in 1929 and was originally known as the New South Wales Women's Basketball Association (NSWWBA). It was formed by members of the Sydney City Girls' Amateur Sports Association. In 1970 it became the New South Wales Netball Association (NSWNA).

Between 1980 and 2014, the Netball NSW headquarters were based at the Anne Clark Centre in Lidcombe. It was officially opened on 11 October 1980 and named after Anne Clark, who had served as the organisation's president between 1950 and 1979. In December 2014, Netball NSW moved to its current home at Netball Central, Sydney Olympic Park.

== Representative teams ==
=== Current ===
Team	Leagues	Years
New South Wales Swifts	Suncorp Super Netball; ANZ Championship	2017– 2008–2016
Giants Netball	Suncorp Super Netball	2017–
Under-19, Under-17	Australian National Netball Championships	

=== Former ===
Team	Leagues	Years
Netball New South Wales Waratahs	Australian Netball League	2008–2019
Netball New South Wales Blues	Australian Netball League	2008–2014
Sydney Swifts	Commonwealth Bank Trophy	1997–2007
Sydney Sandpipers	Commonwealth Bank Trophy	1997–2003
Hunter Jaegers	Commonwealth Bank Trophy	2003–2007

== Competitions ==
- Netball NSW Premier League
- Dooleys Metro League
- Regional League
- Regional State Cup
- Senior State Titles
- Junior State Titles
- Summer Series
- Masters State Titles
- Social Masters

== Netball NSW Board ==
Notable board members

Members	Years
Anne Clark	President, 1950–1979
