= Netball Central, Sydney =

Netball venue in Australia

Netball Central
- Former names: Genea Netball Centre
- Location: 2 Olympic Boulevard; Sydney Olympic Park; New South Wales
- Owner: Netball New South Wales
- Capacity: 860
- Surface: Timber sprung floor courts

Construction
- Groundbreaking: 2013
- Opened: 2014
- Cost: $35m
- Architect: Studio.SC

Tenants
- New South Wales Swifts; Giants Netball; Giants Netball Academy; Netball NSW Premier League; NNSW Waratahs; Canberra Giants

Website
- www.netballcentral.com.au

Netball Central is an Australian netball venue located in Sydney Olympic Park, New South Wales. Between 2016 and 2018, due to a naming rights arrangement, it was known as the Genea Netball Centre. The venue is owned by Netball New South Wales. It serves as their headquarters and as the main training base for New South Wales Swifts and Giants Netball. It was a host venue for the 2015 Netball World Cup and the 2018 Invictus Games. As well as netball, Netball Central regularly hosts martial arts, volleyball, table tennis, badminton and basketball tournaments and competitions.

== History ==
=== Construction ===
In February 2011, Netball New South Wales announced their plans to build a new Netball Centre of Excellence in Sydney Olympic Park. Construction work began on the projection in 2013, with the "turning of the sod" taking place on Sunday, 17 February 2013. The architects were Scott Carver Architects (now Studio.SC) and the builder was Probuild, while the Arup Group acted as consultants. Netball Central was the first sports facility to be built at the park since the 2000 Summer Olympics. Located on Olympic Boulevard, it was built on land in front of the State Sports Centre. One of its most distinctive features is a gable-roofed portal frame of laminated veneer lumber. The finished project cost $35m and was funded by the Australian Government, the Government of New South Wales, the Sydney Olympic Park Authority and Netball New South Wales.

=== Opening ===
On Monday, 1 December 2014, Netball New South Wales moved into Netball Central. It was officially opened on 6 February 2015 with a ceremony attended by Wendy Archer, the Netball NSW President, Carolyn Campbell, the Netball NSW CEO, Stuart Ayres, a Government of New South Wales minister and Craig Laundy, the Member of Parliament for Reid. It was originally due to be officially opened in December 2014 but was the ceremony was cancelled due to the Lindt Cafe siege.

During its first year open, Netball Central hosted three major netball tournaments. In February 2015 New South Wales Swifts hosted the 2015 ANZ Championship Official Pre-Season Summer Shootout. The tournament featured all ten ANZ Championship teams. This was the first major netball tournament to be held at the venue. In April 2015, Netball Central hosted the under-17 and under-19 Australian National Netball Championships tournaments. New South Wales finished as under-19 champions and as under-17 runners-up. In August 2015 Netball Central was a host venue for the 2015 Netball World Cup. It was the official training venue for all sixteen participating teams. It also hosted pool matches, play-offs and placing games.

=== Tenants ===
Netball Central serves as the headquarters for Netball New South Wales and as the main training base for New South Wales Swifts and Giants Netball.

Between 2015 and 2019, Netball Central regularly hosted Australian Netball League matches. Both NNSW Waratahs and Canberra Giants played home matches at the venue. The venue also hosted the 2016 ANL Final Series. In the grand final Waratahs lost 53–46 to Victorian Fury.

Since 2016, Netball Central has been the host venue for the Netball NSW Premier League. It also hosts numerous other netball competitions organised by Netball New South Wales, including the Dooleys Metro League.

In 2016, Sydney Warriors and Sydney Amazons announced that they would play their home matches for the 2016 Australian Volleyball League and Australian Women's Volleyball League seasons at Netball Central.

== Facilities ==
Netball Central features six timber sprung courts, including a show court which seats 860.

== Events hosted ==
Netball Central regularly hosts martial arts, volleyball, table tennis, basketball tournaments.

Date	Event	
February 2015	2015 ANZ Championship Official Pre-Season Summer Shootout	Pre-season netball tournament featuring the ten ANZ Championship teams.
April 2015	2015 Australian National Netball Championships	Under-17 and Under-19 tournaments.
August 2015	2015 Netball World Cup	Training venue for all 16 participating teams. Hosted pool matches, play-off and placing games. Hosted 16 matches.
June 2016	2016 Australian Netball League Finals Series	Victorian Fury defeated NNSW Waratahs 53–46 in the grand final.
November 2016	2016 Sydney International	Badminton tournament
March 2018	Pre-Season Tournament	Tournament featuring Swifts, Giants, West Coast Fever and England played before 2018 Suncorp Super Netball season
May 2018	2018 Sydney International	Badminton tournament
August 2018	2018 IWRF World Championship	Wheelchair rugby tournament
October 2018	2018 Invictus Games	Sitting volleyball pool matches, Powerlifting heats and finals
September 2022	2022 FIBA Women's Basketball World Cup	Training venue

== Naming rights sponsor ==
	Years
Genea	2016–2018
