= Sarah Wall =

Australian netball player (born 1984)

Personal information
- Born: 16 October 1984 (age 42)
- Occupations: Owner NETFIT. Previously Creative Director, Jeanieboy.
- Height: 1.74 m (5 ft 8 1/2 in)

Netball career
- Playing positions: WA, C
Years	Club team	Apps
2005–07	Melbourne Phoenix	
2010	Queensland Firebirds	
2009	Melbourne Vixens	
2011	New South Wales Swifts	
- Updated on 20 February 2011

Sarah Wall (born 16 October 1984) is an Australian netball player. She currently plays for Giants Netball in the Suncorp Super Netball competition, as an injury replacement player. She has previously played for the New South Wales Swifts. In 2005 she played her first year of elite netball, for the Melbourne Phoenix in the Commonwealth Bank Trophy. She played three years with the Phoenix until the competition was disbanded in 2007. She was not signed with a team in the new ANZ Championship in its inaugural season the following year. But in 2009 she received a callup to the Melbourne Vixens. In 2010 Wall transferred to the Queensland Firebirds, but towards the end of the 2010 season she injured her CL. In August that year she signed back with the Vixens on a two-year contract starting in 2011.

Experienced Victorian midcourter Wall was called into the NSW Swifts side in Rounds 4 and 5 of the 2014 ANZ Championship as a replacement player for Paige Hadley who suffered a season-ending knee injury prior to Round 2.

A wing attack with four years of ANZ Championship experience, Wall fitted seamlessly into the Swifts attacking line, and was named the permanent replacement for Hadley for the remainder of the 2014 ANZ Championship on 4 April 2014 - read the announcement. She was rewarded for her contribution to the team with the 2014 NSW Swifts Coaches' Award.

== ANZ Championship accolades ==
- 2014 NSW Swifts Coaches' Award
- 2009 Premiership with the Melbourne Vixens
